= 2010 Women's British Open =

Golf tournament

Coordinates: 53.622°N 3.033°W

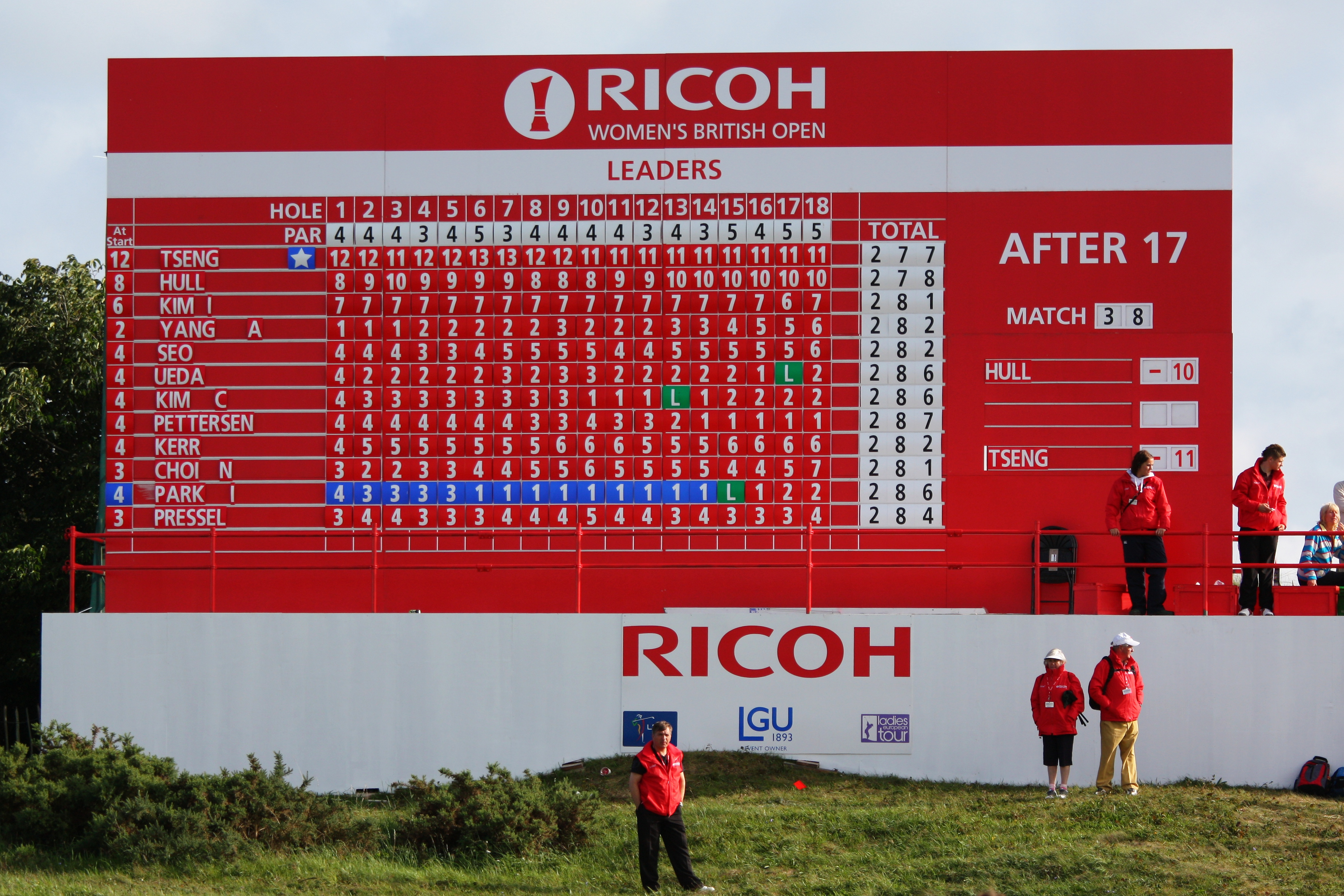
- A view of the leaderboard next to the 18th green after completion of the tournament

Tournament information
- Dates: 29 July – 1 August 2010
- Location: Southport, England
- Course: Royal Birkdale Golf Club
- Organized by: Ladies' Golf Union
- Tours: LPGA Tour; Ladies European Tour

Statistics
- Par: 72
- Length: 6,458 yards (5,905 m)
- Field: 144 players, 75 after cut
- Cut: 149 (+5)
- Prize fund: $2,500,000 €1,917,783
- Winner's share: $408,714 €313,530

Champion
- (Taiwan) Yani Tseng
- 277 (−11)

Location in England

The 2010 Women's British Open was held 29 July to 1 August at Royal Birkdale Golf Club in Southport, England. It was the 34th edition of the Women's British Open, and the tenth as a major championship on the LPGA Tour.

This was the fifth time the Women's British Open had been held at Royal Birkdale and the second as an LPGA major, previously in 2005. The course had also hosted nine Open Championships, most recently in 2008. The par-72 course was set by the Ladies Golf Union at 6,458 yards (5,905 m), 715 yards (654 m) shorter than the par-70 set-up for The Open Championship in 2008.

The champion was Yani Tseng of Taiwan at 277 (−11), one stroke ahead of runner-up Katherine Hull of Australia. With the victory, the 21-year-old Tseng became the youngest-ever winner of three major championships.

== Course ==
Hole	1	2	3	4	5	6	7	8	9	Out	10	11	12	13	14	15	16	17	18	In	Total
Yards	430	410	373	175	338	478	145	413	397	3,159	360	352	149	430	163	499	358	516	472	3,299	6,458
Par	4	4	4	3	4	5	3	4	4	35	4	4	3	4	3	5	4	5	5	37	72

Previous length of the course for the Women's British Open (since 2001):

- 2005: 6,463 yards (5,910 m), par 72

== Round summaries ==
=== First round ===
Thursday, 29 July 2010

Place	Player	Score	To par
T1	(Australia) Katherine Hull	68	−4
T1	(Taiwan) Yani Tseng	68	−4
T3	(France) Anne-Lise Caudal	69	−3
T3	(United States) Brittany Lincicome	69	−3
T3	(South Korea) Amy Yang	69	−3
T3	(South Korea) Sun Young Yoo	69	−3
T7	(South Korea) In-Kyung Kim	70	−2
T7	(United States) Michelle Wie	70	−2
T9	(South Africa) Stacy Bregman	71	−1
T9	(United States) Juli Inkster	71	−1
T9	(United States) Brittany Lang	71	−1
T9	(United States) Stacy Lewis	71	−1
T9	(France) Gwladys Nocera	71	−1
T9	(United States) Stacy Prammanasudh	71	−1
T9	(South Korea) Jiyai Shin	71	−1

=== Second round ===
Friday, 30 July 2010

Place	Player	Score	To par
1	(Taiwan) Yani Tseng	68-68=136	−8
T2	(United States) Cristie Kerr	73-67=140	−4
T2	(United States) Brittany Lincicome	69-71=140	−4
T2	(South Korea) Amy Yang	69-71=140	−4
T5	(United States) Juli Inkster	71-70=141	−3
T5	(Norway) Suzann Pettersen	73-68=141	−3
T5	(South Korea) Sun Young Yoo	69-72=141	−3
T8	(France) Anne-Lise Caudal	69-73=142	−2
T8	(Australia) Katherine Hull	68-74=142	−2
T8	(South Korea) M. J. Hur	74-68=142	−2
T8	(United States) Christina Kim	74-68=142	−2
T8	(South Korea) In-Kyung Kim	70-72=142	−2
T8	(South Korea) Hee-kyung Seo	73-69=142	−2
T8	(South Korea) Jiyai Shin	71-71=142	−2
T8	(Japan) Momoko Ueda	72-70=142	−2

=== Third round ===
Saturday, 31 July 2010

Place	Player	Score	To par
1	(Taiwan) Yani Tseng	68-68-68=204	−12
2	(Australia) Katherine Hull	68-74-66=208	−8
3	(South Korea) In-Kyung Kim	70-72-68=210	−6
4	(United States) Brittany Lincicome	69-71-71=211	−5
T5	(United States) Cristie Kerr	73-67-72=212	−4
T5	(United States) Christina Kim	74-68-70=212	−4
T5	(Norway) Suzann Pettersen	73-68-71=212	−4
T5	(South Korea) Hee-kyung Seo	73-69-70=212	−4
T5	(Japan) Momoko Ueda	72-70-70=212	−4
T10	(South Korea) Na Yeon Choi	74-70-69=213	−3
T10	(United States) Morgan Pressel	77-71-65=213	−3

=== Final round ===
Sunday, 1 August 2010

Place	Player	Score	To par	Money ($)
1	(Taiwan) Yani Tseng	68-68-68-73=277	−11	408,714
2	(Australia) Katherine Hull	68-74-66-70=278	−10	256,209
T3	(South Korea) Na Yeon Choi	74-70-69-68=281	−7	159,825
T3	(South Korea) In-Kyung Kim	70-72-68-71=281	−7	159,825
T5	(United States) Cristie Kerr	73-67-72-70=282	−6	101,670
T5	(South Korea) Hee-kyung Seo	73-69-70-70=282	−6	101,670
T5	(South Korea) Amy Yang	69-71-74-68=282	−6	101,670
8	(United States) Morgan Pressel	77-71-65-71=284	−4	81,753
T9	(United States) Christina Kim	74-68-70-74=286	−2	61,978
T9	(United States) Brittany Lincicome	69-71-71-75=286	−2	61,978
T9	(Japan) Ai Miyazato	76-70-73-67=286	−2	61,978
T9	(South Korea) Inbee Park	72-71-77-66=286	−2	61,978
T9	(Japan) Momoko Ueda	72-70-70-74=286	−2	61,978

==== Scorecard ====
Hole	1	2	3	4	5	6	7	8	9	10	11	12	13	14	15	16	17	18
Par	4	4	4	3	4	5	3	4	4	4	4	3	4	3	5	4	5	5
(Taiwan) Tseng	−12	−12	−11	−12	−12	−13	−13	−12	−12	−11	−11	−11	−11	−11	−11	−11	−11	−11
(Australia) Hull	−8	−9	−10	−9	−9	−9	−9	−8	−8	−8	−9	−9	−10	−10	−10	−10	−10	−10

Cumulative tournament scores, relative to par
