= 2011 LPGA Championship =

Tournament information
- Dates: June 23–26, 2011
- Location: Pittsford, New York, U.S. 43.088°N 77.563°W
- Course: Locust Hill Country Club
- Tour: LPGA Tour
- Format: Stroke play - 72 holes

Statistics
- Par: 72
- Length: 6,534 yards (5,975 m)
- Field: 150 players, 78 after cut
- Cut: 146 (+2)
- Prize fund: $2,500,000
- Winner's share: $375,000

Champion
- (Taiwan) Yani Tseng
- 269 (−19)
- Location in the United States Location in New York

The 2011 LPGA Championship was the 57th LPGA Championship, held June 23–26 at Locust Hill Country Club in Pittsford, New York, a suburb southeast of Rochester. Known for sponsorship reasons as the Wegmans LPGA Championship, it was the second of four major championships on the LPGA Tour during the 2011 season. This was the second of four consecutive years the LPGA Championship was played at Locust Hill.

The champion was Yani Tseng, age 22, with a 269 (−19) to win by ten strokes over Morgan Pressel. It was Tseng's second LPGA Championship victory (2008) and fourth major championship. It was her third victory of 2011 and eighth career win on the LPGA Tour. It was the second consecutive year with a double-digit victory margin. Defending champion Cristie Kerr tied for third, eleven strokes back; she won by twelve strokes in 2010.

== Course layout ==
Hole	1	2	3	4	5	6	7	8	9	Out	10	11	12	13	14	15	16	17	18	In	Total
Yards	414	337	380	532	161	439	178	466	172	3,079	413	509	361	386	400	150	341	478	387	3,425	6,504
Par	4	4	4	5	3	4	3	5	3	35	4	5	4	4	4	3	4	5	4	37	72

== Field ==
The field was composed of 150 players, which included one amateur, with the cut to the top 70 players and ties after the second round.

== Round summaries ==
=== First round ===
Thursday, June 23, 2011

Place	Player	Score	To par
1	(Taiwan) Yani Tseng	66	−6
2	(United States) Paula Creamer	67	−5
T3	(United States) Diana D'Alessio	68	−4
T3	(South Korea) Meena Lee	68	−4
T3	(United States) Stacy Prammanasudh	68	−4
T3	(United States) Angela Stanford	68	−4
T7	(Finland) Minea Blomqvist	69	−3
T7	(Taiwan) Amy Hung	69	−3
T7	(United States) Jennifer Johnson	69	−3
T7	(United States) Stacy Lewis	69	−3
T7	(United States) Ryann O'Toole	69	−3
T7	(South Korea) Hee Young Park	69	−3
T7	(United States) Morgan Pressel	69	−3

=== Second round ===
Friday, June 24, 2011

The cut was at 146 (+2) or better and 78 players advanced to play on the weekend. The only amateur, 18-year-old Danielle Kang, made the cut. Kang was the U.S. Women's Amateur champion in 2010 and would repeat in 2011.

Place	Player	Score	To par
1	(Taiwan) Yani Tseng	66-70=136	−8
2	(United States) Pat Hurst	70-67=137	−7
T3	(Finland) Minea Blomqvist	69-69=138	−6
T3	(United States) Morgan Pressel	69-69=138	−6
T3	(South Korea) Hee Young Park	69-69=138	−6
T6	(United States) Paula Creamer	67-72=139	−5
T6	(United States) Cindy Lacrosse	70-69=139	−5
T6	(South Korea) Amy Yang	70-69=139	−5
9	(United States) Angela Stanford	68-72=139	−4
T10	(China) Shanshan Feng	75-66=141	−3
T10	(United States) Tiffany Joh	71-70=141	−3
T10	(South Korea) Jimin Kang	71-70=141	−3
T10	(South Korea) Meena Lee	68-73=141	−3
T10	(United States) Stacy Lewis	69-72=141	−3
T10	(Spain) Azahara Muñoz	70-71=141	−3
T10	(United States) Stacy Prammanasudh	68-73=141	−3
T10	(United States) Reilly Rankin	73-68=141	−3
T10	(Japan) Momoko Ueda	72-69=141	−3

=== Third round ===
Saturday, June 25, 2011

Place	Player	Score	To par
1	(Taiwan) Yani Tseng	66-70-67=203	−13
T2	(United States) Cindy Lacrosse	70-69-69=208	−8
T2	(United States) Morgan Pressel	69-69-70=208	−8
4	(South Korea) Hee Young Park	69-69-72=210	−6
T5	(United States) Paula Creamer	67-72-72=211	−5
T5	(United States) Cristie Kerr	72-72-67=211	−5
T5	(South Korea) Meena Lee	68-73-70=211	−5
T5	(United States) Stacy Lewis	69-72-70=211	−5
T9	(United States) Katie Futcher	75-68-69=212	−4
T9	(Sweden) Maria Hjorth	71-71-70=212	−4
T9	(United States) Pat Hurst	70-67-75=212	−4
T9	(South Korea) I.K. Kim	73-70-69=212	−4
T9	(Japan) Mika Miyazato	72-72-68=211	−4
T9	(Spain) Azahara Muñoz	70-71-71=212	−4
T9	(Japan) Momoko Ueda	72-69-71=212	−4

=== Final round ===
Sunday, June 26, 2011

Place	Player	Score	To par	Money ($)
1	(Taiwan) Yani Tseng	66-70-67-66=269	−19	375,000
2	(United States) Morgan Pressel	69-69-70-71=279	−9	228,695
T3	(United States) Paula Creamer	67-72-72-69=280	−8	132,512
T3	(United States) Cristie Kerr	72-72-67-69=280	−8	132,512
T3	(Norway) Suzann Pettersen	72-72-69-67=280	−8	132,512
T6	(South Korea) Meena Lee	68-73-70-71=282	−6	77,630
T6	(United States) Stacy Lewis	69-72-70-71=282	−6	77,630
T8	(Sweden) Maria Hjorth	71-71-70-71=283	−5	53,840
T8	(United States) Pat Hurst	70-67-75-71=283	−5	53,840
T8	(Japan) Mika Miyazato	72-72-68-71=283	−5	53,840
T8	(Spain) Azahara Muñoz	70-71-71-71=283	−5	53,840
