= 2008 in golf =

This article summarizes the highlights of professional and amateur golf in the year 2008.

== Men's professional golf ==
Major championships

- 10–13 April: The Masters - South African Trevor Immelman won his first major by a three-stroke margin.
- 12–15, 16 June: U.S. Open - American Tiger Woods won his 14th major by making birdie on the 72nd hole in regulation, and forcing an 18-hole playoff with Rocco Mediate on Monday, 16 June. They each finished the playoff at even par 71, and then went to a sudden death playoff. Woods made a par to Mediate's bogey on the first hole for the win.
- 17–20 July: The Open Championship - Pádraig Harrington won his second consecutive Open Championship in a four stroke victory over Ian Poulter. Fifty-three-year-old Greg Norman who led after three rounds, finished tied third.
- 7–10 August: PGA Championship - Pádraig Harrington won his second consecutive major by two shots over Ben Curtis and Sergio García.

FedEx Cup playoff events - see 2008 FedEx Cup Playoffs

- 21–24 August: The Barclays - Vijay Singh won in a playoff against Sergio García and Kevin Sutherland.
- 28 August – 1 September: Deutsche Bank Championship - Vijay Singh won his second consecutive playoff event with a tournament record 22 under par.
- 4–7 September: BMW Championship - Camilo Villegas won his first PGA Tour event. Vijay Singh's finish as tied 44th was enough to ensure ownership of the 2008 FedEX Cup, providing he completed 72 holes at the final event.
- 25–28 September: The Tour Championship - Camilo Villegas defeated Sergio García in a playoff. Vijay Singh won the FedEx Cup.

Other leading PGA Tour events

- 20–24 February: WGC-Accenture Match Play Championship - Tiger Woods won the tournament for the third time, beating Stewart Cink in the final 8 and 7. He also becomes the first golfer to hold all three individual World Golf Championships titles simultaneously.
- 20–23 March WGC-CA Championship - Geoff Ogilvy wrapped up the win on Monday after bad weather pushed the tournament into a fifth day.
- 8–11 May: The Players Championship - Sergio García outlasted Paul Goydos in a one-hole playoff to claim his first PGA Tour title in three years.
- 31 July – 3 August: WGC-Bridgestone Invitational - Vijay Singh won his first World Golf Championship event and his 32nd PGA Tour event overall, putting him in the record books for most victories by an international player.

For a complete list of PGA Tour results see PGA Tour.

Other leading European Tour events

- 22–25 May: BMW PGA Championship - Miguel Ángel Jiménez of Spain defeated Englishman Oliver Wilson in a playoff.
- 30 October – 2 November: Volvo Masters - Søren Kjeldsen

For a complete list of European Tour results see 2008 European Tour.

Team events

- 18–21 September: Ryder Cup - Team USA regains the trophy with a 16½–11½ win over Team Europe.

Tour leaders

- PGA Tour - (Fiji) Vijay Singh ($6,601,094)
- European Tour - (Sweden) Robert Karlsson (€2,732,748)
- Japan Golf Tour - Shingo Katayama (¥180,094,895)
- Asian Tour - (India) Jeev Milkha Singh ($1,452,707)
- PGA Tour of Australasia - (New Zealand) Mark Brown (A$440,027)
- Sunshine Tour - (South Africa) Richard Sterne (R5,599,265)

Awards

- PGA Tour
  - FedEx Cup – Vijay Singh
  - PGA Player of the Year - Pádraig Harrington
  - Player of the Year (Jack Nicklaus Trophy) - Pádraig Harrington
  - Leading money winner (Arnold Palmer Award) - Vijay Singh
  - Vardon Trophy - Sergio García
  - Byron Nelson Award - Sergio García
  - Rookie of the year - Andrés Romero
  - Comeback Player of the Year - Dudley Hart
- Champions Tour
  - Player of the Year - Bernhard Langer
  - Rookie of the Year - Bernhard Langer
  - Comeback Player of the Year -
- Nationwide Tour
  - Player of the Year - Brendon de Jonge
- European Tour
  - Player of the Year - Pádraig Harrington
  - Rookie of the Year - Pablo Larrazábal

Other tour results

- 2008 Asian Tour
- 2008 PGA Tour of Australasia
- 2008 Canadian Tour
- 2008 Challenge Tour
- 2008 Japan Golf Tour
- 2008 Nationwide Tour
- 2008 Tour de las Americas

Other happenings

- 18 June – Tiger Woods announced he will miss the remainder of the 2008 season to recover from reconstructive anterior cruciate ligament surgery on his left knee.
- 21 November – Jason Hak, an amateur from Hong Kong, became the youngest player ever to make the cut in a European Tour event, at 14 years and 304 days at the UBS Hong Kong Open.

== Women's professional golf ==
LPGA majors

- 3–6 April: Kraft Nabisco Championship - The number one ranked player in the world, Lorena Ochoa, eased to a five-shot win over Suzann Pettersen and Annika Sörenstam to claim her second consecutive major.
- 5–8 June: LPGA Championship - Taiwanese teenager Yani Tseng became the youngest ever LPGA Championship winner and the first Taiwanese golfer to win a major.
- 26–29 June: U.S. Women's Open - Inbee Park notched a 4-stroke victory, becoming the youngest-ever winner in the 63-year history of the tournament.
- 31 July – 3 August: Ricoh Women's British Open - Jiyai Shin, a member of the KLPGA, won her first major tournament in a three-stroke victory over Yani Tseng.

Ladies European Tour major (in addition to the Women's British Open)

- 24–27 July: Evian Masters - Helen Alfredsson won in the third sudden-death playoff hole over Na Yeon Choi. Alfredsson previously won this event in 1994 and 1998.

For a complete list of Ladies European Tour results see Ladies European Tour.

Additional LPGA Tour events

- 2–5 October: Samsung World Championship - Paula Creamer won the limited field event by one stroke to claim her fourth LPGA Tour win of the season.
- 20–23 November: LPGA Playoffs at The ADT - Jiyai Shin won the season-ending championship with its $1 million prize. She also became the first non-LPGA member to ever win three LPGA tournaments.

For a complete list of LPGA Tour results, see 2008 LPGA Tour.

Team events

- 18–20 January: Women's World Cup of Golf - Jennifer Rosales and Dorothy Delasin representing the Philippines won the tournament with a winning score of 18 under par 198. The team from Korea was second in the 40-team field.
- 28–30 November: Lexus Cup - The Internalional team defeated the Asian team, 12½ to 11½.

Money list leaders

- LPGA Tour – Mexican Lorena Ochoa ($2,763,193) wins her third straight money title.
- Ladies European Tour – Gwladys Nocera of France tops the Order of Merit with €391,840.
- Duramed Futures Tour - American teenager Vicky Hurst topped the money list with earnings of $93,107.
- LPGA of Korea Tour - Jiyai Shin topped the list for the third straight year with earnings of 765 million won.
- LPGA of Japan Tour - Miho Koga won the money list title with earnings of ¥120.85 million.
- Ladies Asian Golf Tour - Korean Hee Kyung Seo earned $45,000 to win the money list title.
- ALPG Tour - Karrie Webb of Australia topped the 2007/08 money list with A$99,600 in earnings.

Awards

- LPGA Tour Player of the Year – (Mexico) Lorena Ochoa
- LPGA Tour Rookie of the Year – (Taiwan) Yani Tseng
- LPGA Tour Vare Trophy – (Mexico) Lorena Ochoa
- LET Player of the Year – (France) Gwladys Nocera
- LET Rookie of the Year – (England) Melissa Reid

Other happenings

- 13 April: With a win at the Corona Championship, Lorena Ochoa earned enough points to qualify for the World Golf Hall of Fame. Her qualification would have become final when she completed ten years as an LPGA Tour member in 2012, but she chose to retire at the end of the 2010 season in order to start a family.
- 27 April: 17-year-old rookie Vicky Hurst broke the Duramed Futures Tour 54-hole scoring record with an 18-under par 198 performance at the Jalapeno Golf Classic. The previous record had been set by Grace Park in 1999 at the Betty Puskar Golf Classic.

== Senior men's professional golf ==
Senior majors

- 22–25 May: Senior PGA Championship - Jay Haas won his second Senior PGA title.
- 24–27 July: Senior British Open - Bruce Vaughan won his first Champions Tour event.
- 31 July – 3 August: U.S. Senior Open - Eduardo Romero finished four strokes ahead of Fred Funk, becoming the second Argentinian to win the Senior Open.
- 14–17 August: JELD-WEN Tradition - American Fred Funk won his fourth Champions Tour event and his first major tournament on any tour.
- 9–12 October: Senior Players Championship - American D. A. Weibring won his fifth Champions Tour event and his first major tournament on any tour.

Full results

- 2008 Champions Tour
- 2008 European Seniors Tour

Money list leaders

- Champions Tour - German Bernhard Langer topped the money list with earnings of $2,035,073.
- European Seniors Tour - Welshman Ian Woosnam topped the Order of Merit with earnings of €320,120.

== Amateur golf ==
- 20–23 May: NCAA Division I Women's Golf Championships - USC won its second team championship. Azahara Muñoz of Arizona State won the individual title on the first hole of a playoff with UCLA's Tiffany Joh.
- 28–31 May: NCAA Division I Men's Golf Championships - UCLA swept the team and individual titles, with Kevin Chappell earning the individual title.
- 30 May – 1 June: Curtis Cup - Team USA won the Cup for the sixth consecutive time, defeating Team Great Britain & Ireland 13–7.
- 16–21 June: The Amateur Championship - Reinier Saxton of the Netherlands defeated Tommy Fleetwood of England, 3 & 2.
- 4–10 August: U.S. Women's Amateur - Amanda Blumenherst of the United States defeated Azahara Muñoz of Spain, 2 & 1.
- 18–24 August: U.S. Amateur - Danny Lee of New Zealand became the youngest winner in the history of the tournament, breaking the previous record set by Tiger Woods in 1994.

Other happenings

- 5 May: Amanda Blumenherst, a junior at Duke University, won the Nancy Lopez Award for the second consecutive year. The award is given to the world's most outstanding female amateur golfer.

== World Golf Hall of Fame inductees ==
- (New Zealand) Sir Bob Charles (Veterans)
- (United States) Pete Dye (Lifetime Achievement)
- (United States) Denny Shute (Veterans)
- (United States) Carol Semple Thompson (Lifetime Achievement)
- (United States) Herbert Warren Wind (Lifetime Achievement)
- (United States) Craig Wood (PGA Tour)

== Other ==
Broadcaster Kelly Tilghman was suspended from The Golf Channel for two weeks in January after discussing Tiger Woods's dominance on the PGA Tour and saying that young players should "lynch him in a back alley." The comment came during the final round of the Mercedes-Benz Championship.

== Table of results ==
This table summarises all the results referred to above in date order.

Dates	Tournament	Status or tour	Winner
18–20 Jan	Women's World Cup of Golf	Professional world team championship	Philippines
20–24 Feb	WGC-Accenture Match Play Championship	World Golf Championships	(United States) Tiger Woods
20–23 Mar	WGC-CA Championship	World Golf Championships	(Australia) Geoff Ogilvy
3–6 Apr	Kraft Nabisco Championship	LPGA major	(Mexico) Lorena Ochoa
10–13 Apr	The Masters	Men's major	(South Africa) Trevor Immelman
8–11 May	The Players Championship	PGA Tour	(Spain) Sergio García
20–23 May	NCAA Division I Women's Golf Championships	U.S. college championship	Southern Cal. / Azahara Muñoz
22–25 May	BMW PGA Championship	European Tour	(Spain) Miguel Ángel Jiménez
22–25 May	Senior PGA Championship	Senior major	(United States) Jay Haas
28–31 May	NCAA Division I Men's Golf Championships	U.S. college championship	UCLA / Kevin Chappell
30 May – 1 Jun	Curtis Cup	Great Britain v. United States; Women's amateur team event	United States
5–8 Jun	LPGA Championship	LPGA major	(Taiwan) Yani Tseng
12–15 Jun	U.S. Open	Men's major	(United States) Tiger Woods
16–21 Jun	The Amateur Championship	Amateur men's individual tournament	(Netherlands) Reinier Saxton
26–29 Jun	U.S. Women's Open	LPGA major	(South Korea) Inbee Park
17–20 Jul	The Open Championship	Men's major	(Republic of Ireland) Pádraig Harrington
24–27 Jul	Evian Masters	Ladies European Tour major and LPGA Tour regular event	(Sweden) Helen Alfredsson
24–27 Jul	Senior British Open	Senior major	(United States) Bruce Vaughan
31 Jul – 3 Aug	WGC-Bridgestone Invitational	World Golf Championships	(Fiji) Vijay Singh
31 Jul – 3 Aug	Women's British Open	LPGA and Ladies European Tour major	(South Korea) Jiyai Shin
31 Jul – 3 Aug	U.S. Senior Open	Senior major	(Argentina) Eduardo Romero
4–10 Aug	U.S. Women's Amateur	Amateur women's individual tournament	(United States) Amanda Blumenherst
7–10 Aug	PGA Championship	Men's major	(Republic of Ireland) Pádraig Harrington
14–17 Aug	JELD-WEN Tradition	Senior major	(United States) Fred Funk
18–24 Aug	U.S. Amateur	Amateur men's individual tournament	(New Zealand) Danny Lee
21–24 Aug	The Barclays	PGA Tour FedEx Cup playoff	(Fiji) Vijay Singh
28 Aug – 1 Sep	Deutsche Bank Championship	PGA Tour FedEx Cup playoff	(Fiji) Vijay Singh
4–7 Sep	BMW Championship	PGA Tour FedEx Cup playoff	(Colombia) Camilo Villegas
18–21 Sep	Ryder Cup	Europe v United States men's professional team event	Team USA
25–28 Sep	The Tour Championship	PGA Tour FedEx Cup playoff	(Colombia) Camilo Villegas
2–5 Oct	Samsung World Championship	LPGA Tour	(United States) Paula Creamer
9–12 Oct	Senior Players Championship	Senior major	(United States) D. A. Weibring
30 Oct – 2 Nov	Volvo Masters	European Tour	(Denmark) Søren Kjeldsen
20–23 Nov	LPGA Playoffs at The ADT	LPGA Tour	(South Korea) Jiyai Shin
28–30 Nov	Lexus Cup	Asia v International; Women's professional team event	Team International

The following biennial events will next be played in 2009: Presidents Cup, Seve Trophy, Solheim Cup, Walker Cup.
