= 2010 Kraft Nabisco Championship =

Coordinates: 33.798°N 116.433°W

Tournament information
- Dates: April 1–4, 2010
- Location: Rancho Mirage, California
- Courses: Mission Hills Country Club; Dinah Shore Tourn. Course
- Tour: LPGA Tour
- Format: Stroke play - 72 holes

Statistics
- Par: 72
- Length: 6,702 yards (6,128 m)
- Field: 112 players, 79 after cut
- Cut: 150 (+6)
- Prize fund: $2.0 million
- Winner's share: $300,000

Champion
- (Taiwan) Yani Tseng
- 275 (−13)

Location in the United States
Location in California

The 2010 Kraft Nabisco Championship was played at Mission Hills Country Club in Rancho Mirage, California, from April 1–4. This was the 39th edition of the Kraft Nabisco Championship and the 28th as a women's major golf championship.

This championship was won by Yani Tseng, age 21, with a score of 275 (−13), one stroke over runner-up Suzann Pettersen. This was her third victory on the LPGA Tour and her second major title. ESPN and CBS Sports televised the event.

== Round summaries ==
=== First round ===
Thursday, April 1, 2010

Place	Player	Score	To par
1	(Norway) Suzann Pettersen	67	−5
T2	(United States) Vicky Hurst	68	−4
T2	(South Korea) Min Na-on	68	−4
T2	(England) Karen Stupples	68	−4
T2	(Australia) Karrie Webb	68	−4
T6	(Sweden) Sophie Gustafson	70	−2
T6	(France) Karine Icher	70	−2
T6	(United States) Brittany Lincicome	70	−2
T9	(South Korea) Han Hee-won	71	−1
T9	(United States) Pat Hurst	71	−1
T9	(United States) Cristie Kerr	71	−1
T9	(South Korea) Sarah Lee	71	−1
T9	(United States) Stacy Lewis	71	−1
T9	(South Korea) Grace Park	71	−1
T9	(United States) Morgan Pressel	71	−1
T9	(United States) Michelle Wie	71	−1

=== Second round ===
Friday, April 2, 2010

Place	Player	Score	To par
1	(South Korea) Song-Hee Kim	69-68=137	−7
T2	(United States) Cristie Kerr	71-67=138	−6
T2	(Mexico) Lorena Ochoa	68-70=138	−6
T2	(England) Karen Stupples	69-69=138	−6
T5	(United States) Stacy Lewis	71-68=139	−5
T5	(Australia) Karrie Webb	69-70=139	−5
T7	(Norway) Suzann Pettersen	67-73=140	−4
T7	(Taiwan) Yani Tseng	69-71=140	−4
T9	(Germany) Sandra Gal	72-70=142	−2
T9	(United States) Michelle Wie	71-71=142	−2

=== Third round ===
Saturday, April 3, 2010

Place	Player	Score	To par
1	(England) Karen Stupples	69-69-68=206	−10
T2	(Norway) Suzann Pettersen	67-73-67=207	−9
T2	(Taiwan) Yani Tseng	69-71-67=207	−9
T4	(South Korea) Song-Hee Kim	69-68-72=209	−7
T4	(Mexico) Lorena Ochoa	68-70-71=209	−7
6	(Australia) Karrie Webb	69-70-72=211	−5
T7	(United States) Cristie Kerr	71-67-74=212	−4
T7	(United States) Brittany Lang	72-71-69=212	−4
T9	(Japan) Chie Arimura	73-72-68=213	−3
T9	(South Korea) Grace Park	71-74-68=213	−3
T9	(South Korea) Jiyai Shin	72-72-69=213	−3
T9	(United States) Michelle Wie	71-71-71=213	−3

=== Final round ===
Sunday, April 4, 2010

Place	Player	Score	To par	Money ($)
1	(Taiwan) Yani Tseng	69-71-67-68=275	−13	300,000
2	(Norway) Suzann Pettersen	67-73-67-69=276	−12	183,814
3	(South Korea) Song-Hee Kim	69-68-72-70=279	−9	133,344
4	(Mexico) Lorena Ochoa	68-70-71-73=282	−6	103,152
T5	(United States) Cristie Kerr	71-67-74-72=284	−4	64,408
T5	(South Korea) Jiyai Shin	72-72-69-71=284	−4	64,408
T5	(England) Karen Stupples	69-69-68-78=284	−4	64,408
T5	(Australia) Karrie Webb	69-70-72-73=284	−4	64,408
9	(Japan) Chie Arimura	73-72-68-72=285	−3	44,784
T10	(Sweden) Sophie Gustafson	70-73-70-73=286	−2	35,544
T10	(United States) Brittany Lang	72-71-69-74=286	−2	35,544
T10	(Sweden) Anna Nordqvist	74-72-69-71=286	−2	35,544
T10	(South Korea) Grace Park	71-74-68-73=286	−2	35,544
T10	(South Korea) Inbee Park	73-74-70-69=286	−2	35,544

==== Scorecard ====
Final round

Hole	1	2	3	4	5	6	7	8	9	10	11	12	13	14	15	16	17	18
Par	4	5	4	4	3	4	4	3	5	4	5	4	4	3	4	4	3	5
(Taiwan) Tseng	−9	−11	−12	−12	−12	−12	−12	−13	−13	−13	−14	−13	−13	−13	−13	−13	−13	−13
(Norway) Pettersen	−9	−10	−10	−10	−10	−9	−9	−9	−9	−9	−10	−10	−10	−10	−10	−11	−11	−12
(South Korea) Kim	−7	−7	−7	−7	−7	−8	−8	−8	−8	−8	−9	−9	−8	−8	−9	−9	−9	−9
(Mexico) Ochoa	−7	−7	−8	−8	−7	−7	−6	−6	−6	−7	−8	−8	−7	−7	−7	−7	−7	−6
(United States) Kerr	−4	−4	−4	−4	−4	−4	−4	−4	−4	−3	−3	−3	−3	−3	−4	−3	−3	−4
(South Korea) Shin	−3	−3	−4	−4	−4	−5	−5	−5	−5	−5	−5	−5	−4	−4	−4	−4	−4	−4
(England) Stupples	−10	−11	−11	−10	−10	−8	−8	−8	−8	−7	−8	−8	−8	−8	−6	−6	−6	−4
(Australia) Webb	−5	−5	−5	−5	−5	−5	−5	−5	−4	−5	−5	−5	−5	−4	−4	−4	−4	−4

Cumulative tournament scores, relative to par

Eagle	Birdie	Bogey	Double bogey
