= 2012 LPGA Tour =

Golf tour season

2012 LPGA Tour season
- Duration: February 9, 2012 – November 18, 2012
- Number of official events: 29
- Most wins: 4 (United States) Stacy Lewis
- Money leader: (South Korea) Inbee Park
- Rolex Player of the Year: (United States) Stacy Lewis
- Vare Trophy: (South Korea) Inbee Park
- Rookie of the Year: (South Korea) Ryu So-yeon

The 2012 LPGA Tour was a series of weekly golf tournaments for elite female golfers from around the world that began in Australia on February 9 and ended November 18 in Florida. The tournaments are sanctioned by the United States–based Ladies Professional Golf Association (LPGA).

== Season overview ==
There were 27 official tournaments on the 2012 LPGA Tour, four more than in 2011. Fifteen tournaments were held in the United States. Eleven other countries hosted the remaining twelve tournaments.

Stacy Lewis won the most tournaments, four, and won the Player of the Year award. Inbee Park won two tournaments and both the money title with earnings of $2,266,638 and the Vare Trophy for lowest scoring average. So Yeon Ryu won Rookie of the Year honors, winning one tournament, finishing sixth on the money list and second in scoring average.

Other players winning multiple tournaments were Yani Tseng with three wins and Na Yeon Choi, Ai Miyazato, Suzann Pettersen, and Jiyai Shin with two wins each.

== Changes for 2012 ==
=== Five additional events ===
- ISPS Handa Women's Australian Open in February at Royal Melbourne – existing event now co-sanctioned by LPGA
- LPGA Lotte Championship in Hawaii in April; LPGA returned to Oahu after a two-year hiatus
- Manulife Financial LPGA Classic in Canada in June
- Jamie Farr Toledo Classic in Ohio in August; returned after a year off
- Kingsmill Championship in Virginia in September; LPGA returned to Williamsburg after a two-year absence. Scheduled to move to May in 2013.

source: LPGA 2012 Schedule

=== Final major delayed ===
The Ricoh Women's British Open was moved from its usual late-July date to mid-September, to accommodate the 2012 Summer Olympics in London which were being held in London.

== Schedule and results ==
The number in parentheses after winners' names is the player's total number wins in official money individual events on the LPGA Tour, including that event.

Date	Tournament	Location	Winner	Purse ($)	First prize ($)	Titleholders qualifiers
Feb 12	ISPS Handa Women's Australian Open	Australia	(United States) Jessica Korda (1)	1,100,000	165,000	(United States) Jessica Korda (United States) Stacy Lewis (United States) Brittany Lincicome
Feb 19	Honda LPGA Thailand	Thailand	(Taiwan) Yani Tseng (13)	1,500,000	225,000	(Taiwan) Yani Tseng (Japan) Ai Miyazato (South Korea) Jiyai Shin
Feb 26	HSBC Women's Champions	Singapore	(United States) Angela Stanford (5)	1,400,000	210,000	(United States) Angela Stanford (South Korea) Na Yeon Choi (China) Shanshan Feng
Mar 18	RR Donnelley LPGA Founders Cup	Arizona	(Taiwan) Yani Tseng (14)	1,500,000	225,000	(South Korea) So Yeon Ryu (South Korea) Hee Young Park (Sweden) Caroline Hedwall
Mar 25	Kia Classic	California	(Taiwan) Yani Tseng (15)	1,700,000	255,000	(South Korea) Sun Young Yoo (South Korea) Se Ri Pak (England) Jodi Ewart
Apr 1	Kraft Nabisco Championship	California	(South Korea) Sun-Young Yoo (2)	2,000,000	300,000	(South Korea) I.K. Kim (South Korea) Amy Yang (South Korea) Hee Kyung Seo
Apr 21	LPGA Lotte Championship	Hawaii	(Japan) Ai Miyazato (8)	1,700,000	255,000	(South Korea) Meena Lee (Spain) Azahara Muñoz (United States) Cristie Kerr
Apr 29	Mobile Bay LPGA Classic	Alabama	(United States) Stacy Lewis (2)	1,250,000	187,500	(United States) Lexi Thompson (France) Karine Icher (Australia) Karrie Webb
May 6	HSBC LPGA Brasil Cup^{1}	Brazil	(Thailand) Pornanong Phatlum (n/a)	720,000	108,000	n/a
May 20	Sybase Match Play Championship	New Jersey	(Spain) Azahara Muñoz (1)	1,500,000	375,000	(United States) Morgan Pressel (United States) Vicky Hurst (United States) Candie Kung
Jun 3	ShopRite LPGA Classic	New Jersey	(United States) Stacy Lewis (3)	1,500,000	225,000	(Australia) Katherine Hull (Japan) Mika Miyazato (South Korea) Hee-Won Han
Jun 10	Wegmans LPGA Championship	New York	(China) Shanshan Feng (1)	2,500,000	375,000	(Norway) Suzann Pettersen (South Korea) Eun-Hee Ji (United States) Gerina Piller
Jun 24	Manulife Financial LPGA Classic	Ontario	(United States) Brittany Lang (1)	1,300,000	195,000	(United States) Brittany Lang (South Korea) Inbee Park (South Korea) Chella Choi
Jul 1	Walmart NW Arkansas Championship	Arkansas	(Japan) Ai Miyazato (9)	2,000,000	300,000	(Venezuela) Veronica Felibert (Sweden) Anna Nordqvist (South Korea) Jenny Shin
Jul 8	U.S. Women's Open	Wisconsin	(South Korea) Na Yeon Choi (6)	3,250,000	585,000	(Germany) Sandra Gal (South Korea) Ilhee Lee (Italy) Giulia Sergas
Jul 29	Evian Masters	France	(South Korea) Inbee Park (2)	3,250,000	487,500	(United States) Natalie Gulbis (Spain) Beatriz Recari (United States) Paula Creamer
Aug 12	Jamie Farr Toledo Classic	Ohio	(South Korea) So Yeon Ryu (2)	1,300,000	195,000	(United States) Jennie Lee (United States) Jacqui Concolino (Australia) Lindsey Wright
Aug 19	Safeway Classic	Oregon	(Japan) Mika Miyazato (1)	1,500,000	225,000	(South Korea) Haeji Kang (United States) Sydnee Michaels (United States) Michelle Wie
Aug 26	CN Canadian Women's Open	British Columbia	(New Zealand) Lydia Ko (1) (a)	2,000,000	300,000*	(New Zealand) Lydia Ko (a) (United States) Jane Rah (Scotland) Catriona Matthew
Sep 9	Kingsmill Championship	Virginia	(South Korea) Jiyai Shin (9)	1,300,000	195,000	(United States) Danielle Kang (Sweden) Maria Hjorth (Netherlands) Dewi Claire Schreefel
Sep 16	Ricoh Women's British Open	England	(South Korea) Jiyai Shin (10)	2,750,000	428,650	(Paraguay) Julieta Granada (United States) Katie Futcher (United States) Cindy LaCrosse
Sep 23	Navistar LPGA Classic	Alabama	(United States) Stacy Lewis (4)	1,300,000	195,000	(South Korea) M. J. Hur (Australia) Sarah Jane Smith (Sweden) Pernilla Lindberg
Oct 14	Sime Darby LPGA Malaysia	Malaysia	(South Korea) Inbee Park (3)	1,900,000	285,000	(United States) Lizette Salas (Japan) Momoko Ueda (United States) Mina Harigae
Oct 21	LPGA KEB-HanaBank Championship	South Korea	(Norway) Suzann Pettersen (9)	1,800,000	270,000	(Sweden) Karin Sjödin (United States) Jennifer Johnson (United States) Nicole Castrale
Oct 28	Sunrise LPGA Taiwan Championship	Taiwan	(Norway) Suzann Pettersen (10)	2,000,000	300,000	(Spain) Belén Mozo (Colombia) Mariajo Uribe (United States) Mo Martin
Nov 4	Mizuno Classic	Japan	(United States) Stacy Lewis (5)	1,200,000	180,000	(Thailand) Pornanong Phatlum (United States) Jennifer Song (United States) Alison Walshe
Nov 11	Lorena Ochoa Invitational	Mexico	(United States) Cristie Kerr (15)	1,000,000	200,000	(Mexico) Lorena Ochoa (United States) Kristy McPherson (Mexico) Tanya Dergal
Nov 13	Wendy's 3-Tour Challenge^{1}	Nevada	PGA Tour (n/a)	1,000,000	500,000	n/a
Nov 18	CME Group Titleholders	Florida	(South Korea) Na Yeon Choi (7)	1,500,000	500,000	n/a

^{1} Unofficial events
* Lydia Ko was an amateur when she won the CN Canadian Women's Open; the winner's share went to the runner-up, Inbee Park.

== Season leaders ==
Money list leaders

Rank	Player	Country	Earnings ($)	Events played
1	Inbee Park	South Korea	2,287,080	24
2	Na Yeon Choi	South Korea	1,981,834	22
3	Stacy Lewis	United States	1,872,409	26
4	Yani Tseng	Taiwan	1,430,159	24
5	Ai Miyazato	Japan	1,334,977	23
6	So Yeon Ryu	South Korea	1,282,673	24
7	Jiyai Shin	South Korea	1,234,597	18
8	Azahara Muñoz	Spain	1,230,751	26
9	Suzann Pettersen	Norway	1,182,860	24
10	Shanshan Feng	China	1,101,147	19

Full 2012 Official Money List

Scoring average leaders

Rank	Player	Country	Average
1	Inbee Park	South Korea	70.21
2	So Yeon Ryu	South Korea	70.30
3	Jiyai Shin	South Korea	70.31
4	Stacy Lewis	United States	70.33
5	Na Yeon Choi	South Korea	70.49

Full 2012 Scoring Average List

== See also ==
- 2012 Ladies European Tour
- 2012 Symetra Tour
