= Yani Tseng =

Taiwanese professional golfer (born 1989)

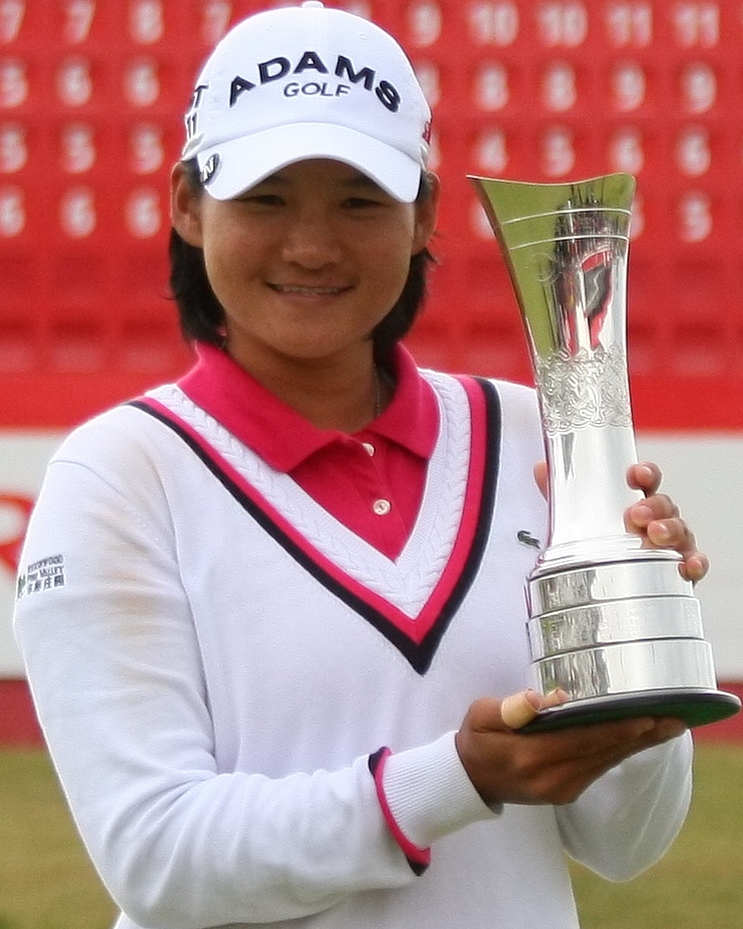
- Tseng with the 2011 Women's British Open trophy

Personal information
- Full name: Yani Tseng
- Nationality: Republic of China (Taiwan)
- Born: 23 January 1989 (age 37) Guishan Township, Taoyuan County (now Guishan District, Taoyuan City), Taiwan
- Height: 5 ft 6 in (1.68 m)

Career
- Sport: Golf
- Turned professional: 2007
- Current tours: LPGA Tour (joined 2008)
- Former tours: Ladies Asian Golf Tour (joined 2007)
- Professional wins: 28

Number of wins by tour
- LPGA Tour: 15
- Ladies European Tour: 7
- Ladies Asian Golf Tour: 3
- WPGA Tour of Australasia: 3
- Other: 5

Best results in LPGA major championships (wins: 5)
- Chevron Championship: Won: 2010
- Women's PGA C'ship: Won: 2008, 2011
- U.S. Women's Open: T10: 2010
- Women's British Open: Won: 2010, 2011
- Evian Championship: T36: 2016

Achievements and awards
- LPGA Tour Rookie of the Year: 2008
- LPGA Tour Player of the Year: 2010, 2011
- LPGA Vare Trophy: 2011
- LPGA Tour Money Winner: 2011
- GWAA Female Player of the Year: 2010, 2011
- Taiwan LPGA Tour Order of Merit winner: 2025
Medal record
Representing Chinese Taipei
Asian Games
Bronze medal – third place	2006 Doha	Women's team

Yani Tseng
- Chinese: 曾雅妮
Transcriptions
Standard Mandarin
- Hanyu Pinyin: Zēng Yǎní
Southern Min
- Hokkien POJ: Cheng Ngà-nî
- Teochew Peng'im: Zeng^{1} Ngian^{2} ni^{5}

Yani Tseng (Chinese: 曾雅妮; pinyin: Zēng Yǎní; born 23 January 1989) is a Taiwanese professional golfer playing on the U.S.-based LPGA Tour. She is the youngest player ever, male or female, to win five major championships. She was ranked number 1 in the Women's World Golf Rankings for 109 consecutive weeks from 2011 to 2013.

== Early life ==
In 1989, Tseng was born. In 2002, she won the Callaway Junior World Golf Championships in the girls 13–14 age group. Tseng was the top-ranked amateur in Taiwan from 2004 to 2006.

== Amateur career ==
The highlight of her amateur career was winning the 2004 U.S. Women's Amateur Public Links, defeating Michelle Wie in the final, 1 up. In addition, she won North and South Women's Amateur Golf Championship in 2005.

== Professional career ==
=== Ladies Asian Golf Tour ===
Tseng turned professional in January 2007. That year she competed on the Ladies Asian Golf Tour, and won the DLF Women's Indian Open. She also competed on the CN Canadian Women's Tour, where she won the CN Canadian Women's Tour event at Vancouver Golf Club.

=== LPGA Tour ===
Tseng entered the LPGA Qualifying Tournament in the fall of 2007, and finished sixth in the final Qualifying Tournament in December, which gave her full playing privileges on the LPGA Tour for 2008. In June 2008, she claimed her first LPGA tour victory at the LPGA Championship to become the first player from Taiwan to win an LPGA major championship. At age 19, she was also the youngest player to win the LPGA Championship and the second-youngest player to win an LPGA major.

Tseng was named LPGA Tour Rookie of the Year in 2008.

On 29 March 2009, Tseng became the fastest player in LPGA history to reach the $2 million mark in career earnings. She achieved this mark in 32 events, spanning one year, one month, and 13 days. The previous record holder was Paula Creamer, who reached the mark in one year, four months, and 15 days in 2006.

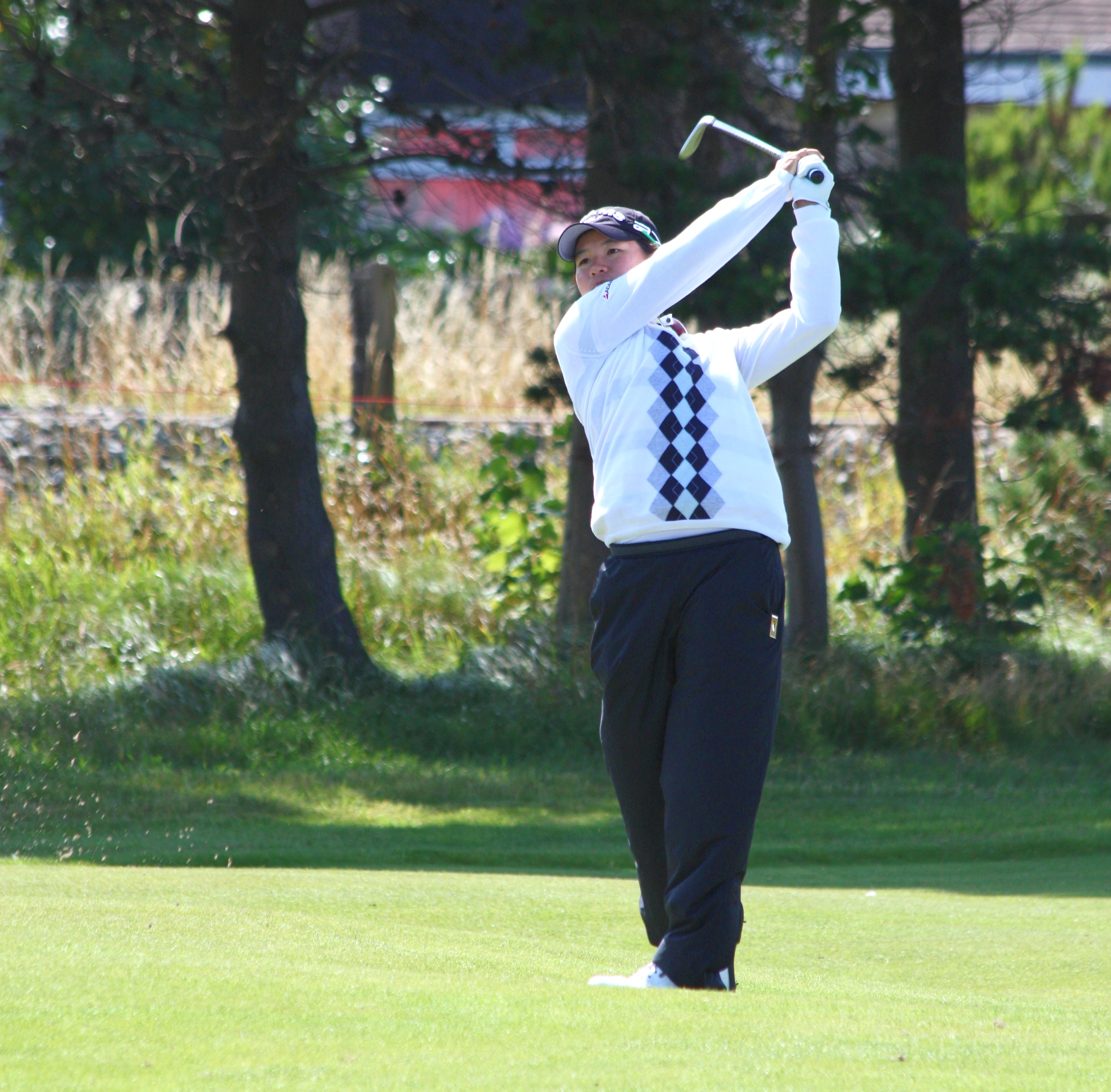
2009 Women's British Open – Yani Tseng displaying her swing.

On 4 April 2010, Tseng won the first major championship of the LPGA season, the Kraft Nabisco Championship, by one stroke. She went on to win her second major of the year on 1 August 2010 by winning the Women's British Open by one stroke, and became the youngest woman in the modern era to win three major championships. LPGA founder Patty Berg was younger than Tseng when she won the 1939 Titleholders Championship. However, that was before the formation of the LPGA Tour in 1950 and the designation of official LPGA major tournaments.

In September 2010, Tseng was offered a five-year sponsorship deal from a Chinese company worth NT$1 billion (US$25 million), with access to a luxury villa and private jets. Tseng rejected the offer because it required she switch her citizenship from Republic of China to China.

In January 2011, Tseng defended her title at the Taifong Ladies Open on the LPGA of Taiwan Tour. Three weeks later she won the ISPS Handa Women's Australian Open, and a week later the ANZ RACV Ladies Masters, both events co-sponsored by the ALPG Tour and the Ladies European Tour. Her wins moved her into the number 1 position in the Women's World Golf Rankings. She won again the next week in the first tournament of the LPGA season, the Honda LPGA Thailand.

In June 2011, she won the LPGA State Farm Classic over Cristie Kerr by three strokes. Two weeks later, she won the LPGA Championship. This made her, at age 22 years and five months, the youngest player to win four LPGA majors. The next month she defended her title at the Women's British Open, becoming the first defending champion winner at the Women's British Open as a major. Her five major titles also made her the youngest player, male or female, at 22 years, six months, to win five major championships.

Tseng won the LPGA Tour Player of the Year for a second straight year. She wrapped up the award while the season still had four events remaining.

Tseng won three of the first five events on the 2012 LPGA Tour: the Honda LPGA Thailand, the RR Donnelley LPGA Founders Cup and the Kia Classic. The Honda LPGA Thailand victory was her second consecutive win at that event.

Tseng's career took a sudden downturn beginning in the latter part of the 2012 season. At the end of 2013, she had dropped from fourth to 38th place on the official LPGA money list and from first to 34th in the Women's World Golf Rankings. Her performance dropped further in 2014; she ended that year at 54th on the official money list and ranked 83rd in the world. Tseng has not won a LPGA tournament since March 2012 (Kia Classic). After accumulating seven top-10 finishes, including four wins, in majors in 2010 through early 2012, starting with the 2012 Women's PGA Championship, she has missed the cut or did not play in a majority of the majors and finished no higher than T13 in the others. There have been no reports of major injuries or other explanation for the sudden change.

=== Hall of Fame ===
Since March 2012, Tseng has been four points away from qualifying for the World Golf Hall of Fame via the LPGA points system, which requires 27 points for Hall of Fame eligibility. Tseng earned one point for each regular tour victory on the LPGA Tour and two points for every major championship victory. She also earned a point each for her two Rolex LPGA Player of the Year awards and one point for winning the Vare Trophy. Tseng has already met the requirement to win one LPGA major, Vare Trophy, or Rolex award.

== Personal life ==
Tseng's father is Mao Hsin Tseng and her mother is Yu-Yun Yang.

Tseng lives in a residential community at Lake Nona Golf & Country Club in Orlando, Florida, in a house that she purchased from former LPGA player Annika Sörenstam in April 2009.

== Awards and honors ==
- In 2008, Tseng was named LPGA Tour Rookie of the Year.
- In 2010 and 2011, Tseng won the LPGA Tour Player of the Year award.
- Tseng was named to Time magazine's list of the "100 Most Influential People in the World in 2012."

== Amateur wins ==
- 2002 Callaway Junior World Golf Championships (Girls 13–14)
- 2004 U.S. Women's Amateur Public Links
- 2005 North and South Women's Amateur Golf Championship

== Professional wins (28) ==
=== LPGA Tour wins (15) ===
Legend
Major championships (5)
Other LPGA Tour (10)

No.	Date	Tournament	Winning score	To par	Margin of victory	Runner(s)-up	Winner's share ($)
1	8 Jun 2008	McDonald's LPGA Championship	73-70-65-68=276	−12	Playoff	(Sweden) Maria Hjorth	300,000
2	24 May 2009	LPGA Corning Classic	68-70-62-67=267	−21	1 stroke	(United States) Paula Creamer (South Korea) Kang Soo-yun	225,000
3	4 Apr 2010	Kraft Nabisco Championship	69-71-67-68=275	−13	1 stroke	(Norway) Suzann Pettersen	300,000
4	1 Aug 2010	Women's British Open^{[1]}	68-68-68-73=277	−11	1 stroke	(Australia) Katherine Hull	408,714
5	12 Sep 2010	P&G NW Arkansas Championship	67-68-65=200	−13	1 stroke	(United States) Michelle Wie	300,000
6	20 Feb 2011	Honda LPGA Thailand	66-71-70-66=273	−15	5 strokes	(United States) Michelle Wie	217,500
7	12 Jun 2011	LPGA State Farm Classic	67-66-66-68=267	−21	3 strokes	(United States) Cristie Kerr	255,000
8	26 Jun 2011	Wegmans LPGA Championship	66-70-67-66=269	−19	10 strokes	(United States) Morgan Pressel	375,000
9	31 Jul 2011	Ricoh Women's British Open^{[1]}	71-66-66-69=272	−16	4 strokes	(United States) Brittany Lang	392,133
10	11 Sep 2011	Walmart NW Arkansas Championship	66-67-68=201	−13	Playoff	(South Korea) Amy Yang	300,000
11	9 Oct 2011	LPGA Hana Bank Championship	65-70-67=202	−14	1 stroke	(South Korea) Choi Na-yeon	270,000
12	23 Oct 2011	Sunrise LPGA Taiwan Championship	68-71-67-66=272	−16	5 strokes	(Spain) Azahara Muñoz (South Korea) Amy Yang	300,000
13	19 Feb 2012	Honda LPGA Thailand	73-65-65-66=269	−19	1 stroke	(Japan) Ai Miyazato	225,000
14	18 Mar 2012	RR Donnelley LPGA Founders Cup	65-70-67-68=270	−18	1 stroke	(South Korea) Choi Na-yeon (Japan) Ai Miyazato	225,000
15	25 Mar 2012	Kia Classic	67-68-69-70=274	−14	6 strokes	(South Korea) Yoo Sun-young	255,000

^{1} Co-sanctioned by the Ladies European Tour.

LPGA Tour playoff record (2–1)

No.	Year	Tournament	Opponent(s)	Result
1	2008	McDonald's LPGA Championship	(Sweden) Maria Hjorth	Won with birdie on fourth extra hole
2	2008	State Farm Classic	(South Korea) Oh Ji-young	Lost to par on first extra hole
3	2011	Walmart NW Arkansas Championship	(South Korea) Amy Yang	Won with birdie on first extra hole

=== Ladies European Tour wins (7) ===
No.	Date	Tournament	Winning score	To par	Margin of victory	Runner(s)-up
1	12 Mar 2010	Handa Women's Australian Open^{[2]}	74-71-72-66=283	−9	3 strokes	(England) Laura Davies
2	1 Aug 2010	Women's British Open^{[3]}	68-68-68-73=277	−11	1 stroke	(Australia) Katherine Hull
3	6 Feb 2011	ISPS Handa Women's Australian Open^{[2]}	70-67-68-71=276	−16	7 strokes	(South Korea) Ji Eun-hee (England) Melissa Reid (South Korea) Jiyai Shin
4	13 Feb 2011	ANZ RACV Ladies Masters^{[2]}	67-66-63-68=264	−24	4 strokes	(Australia) Nikki Campbell (United States) Stacy Lewis
5	31 Jul 2011	Ricoh Women's British Open^{[3]}	71-66-66-69=272	−16	4 strokes	(United States) Brittany Lang
6	30 Oct 2011	Suzhou Taihu Ladies Open^{[4]}	68-66-66=200	−16	7 strokes	(Sweden) Pernilla Lindberg
7	26 Oct 2025	Wistron Ladies Open^{[5]}	63-67=130	−14	4 strokes	(New Zealand) Amelia Garvey

^{2} Co-sanctioned by the ALPG Tour.
^{3} Co-sanctioned by the LPGA.
^{4} Co-sanctioned by the Ladies Asian Golf Tour.
^{5} Co-sanctioned by the Taiwan LPGA Tour.

=== Ladies Asian Golf Tour wins (3) ===
No.	Date	Tournament	Winning score	To par	Margin of victory	Runner(s)-up
1	3 Mar 2007	DLF Women's Indian Open	70-70-75=215	−1	Playoff	(Thailand) Russy Gulyanamitta
2	16 Jan 2011	Taifong Ladies Open^{[6]}	77-73-68=218	+2	3 strokes	(South Korea) Nam Min-ji
3	30 Oct 2011	Suzhou Taihu Ladies Open^{[7]}	68-66-66=200	−16	7 strokes	(Sweden) Pernilla Lindberg

^{6} Co-sanctioned by the Taiwan LPGA Tour.
^{7} Co-sanctioned by the Ladies European Tour.

=== ALPG Tour wins (3) ===
No.	Date	Tournament	Winning score	To par	Margin of victory	Runner(s)-up
1	12 Mar 2010	Handa Women's Australian Open^{[8]}	74-71-72-66=283	−9	3 strokes	(England) Laura Davies
2	6 Feb 2011	ISPS Handa Women's Australian Open^{[8]}	70-67-68-71=276	−16	7 strokes	(South Korea) Ji Eun-hee (England) Melissa Reid (South Korea) Jiyai Shin
3	13 Feb 2011	ANZ RACV Ladies Masters^{[8]}	67-66-63-68=264	−24	4 strokes	(Australia) Nikki Campbell (United States) Stacy Lewis

^{8} Co-sanctioned by the Ladies European Tour.

=== Taiwan LPGA Tour wins (7) ===
No.	Date	Tournament	Winning score	To par	Margin of victory	Runner(s)-up
1	11 Apr 2007	TLPGA Tour Nan-Fong Tournament at Nan-Fong Golf Club	72-68=140	−4	Playoff	(Taiwan) Yueh-Chyn Huang
2	12 Jan 2008	Royal Ladies Open	66-64-66=196	−20	17 strokes	(South Korea) Lee Eun-Kyoung (Thailand) Pornanong Phatlum
3	17 Jan 2010	Taifong Ladies Open	69-73-77=219	+3	4 strokes	(Taiwan) Wei Yun Jye
4	16 Jan 2011	Taifong Ladies Open^{[9]}	77-73-68=218	+2	3 strokes	(South Korea) Nam Min-ji
5	11 Dec 2011	Swinging Skirts TLPGA Invitational	72-70-68=210	−6	7 strokes	(South Korea) Ryu So-yeon (South Korea) Jiyai Shin
6	26 Jan 2014	Taifong Ladies Open	73-72-70=215	−1	2 strokes	(Taiwan) Yen Ling Pan
7	26 Oct 2025	Wistron Ladies Open^{[10]}	63-67=130	−14	4 strokes	(New Zealand) Amelia Garvey

^{9} Co-sanctioned by the Ladies Asian Golf Tour.
^{10} Co-sanctioned by the Ladies European Tour.

=== Other wins (1) ===
No.	Date	Tournament	Winning score	To par	Margin of victory	Runner-up
1	29 May 2007	CN Canadian Women's Tour at Vancouver Golf Club (CN Canadian Women's Tour)	68-72=140	−4	2 strokes	(Canada) Stephanie Sherlock

== Major championships ==
=== Wins (5) ===
No.	Year	Championship	Winning score	To par	Margin of victory	Runner-up	Winner's share ($)
1	2008	LPGA Championship	73-70-65-68=276	−12	Playoff ^{1}	(Sweden) Maria Hjorth	300,000
2	2010	Kraft Nabisco Championship	69-71-67-68=275	−13	1 stroke	(Norway) Suzann Pettersen	300,000
3	2010	Women's British Open	68-68-68-73=277	−11	1 stroke	(Australia) Katherine Hull	408,714
4	2011	LPGA Championship (2)	66-70-67-66=269	−19	10 strokes	(United States) Morgan Pressel	375,000
5	2011	Ricoh Women's British Open (2)	71-66-66-69=272	−16	4 strokes	(United States) Brittany Lang	392,133

^{1} Defeated Hjorth with birdie on fourth extra hole.

=== Results timeline ===
Results not in chronological order.

Tournament	2005	2006	2007	2008	2009	2010	2011	2012
Chevron Championship				T21	T17	1	2	3
U.S. Women's Open	CUT	CUT		T42	CUT	T10	T15	T50
Women's PGA Championship				1	T23	T19	1	T59
Women's British Open				2	T20	1	1	T26

Tournament	2013	2014	2015	2016	2017	2018	2019	2020	2021	2022	2023	2024	2025	2026
Chevron Championship	T48	CUT	CUT	CUT	CUT	CUT	CUT		CUT			CUT	CUT	WD
U.S. Women's Open	CUT	T35	CUT	T59									CUT	CUT
Women's PGA Championship	T19	T30	CUT	CUT	CUT	CUT			CUT			CUT	CUT	CUT
The Evian Championship^	CUT	CUT	CUT	T36	CUT			NT						
Women's British Open	CUT	CUT	T13	T31	T30	CUT						CUT	T63	CUT

^ The Evian Championship was added as a major in 2013

Win
Top 10
Did not play

CUT = missed the half-way cut
NT = no tournament
WD = withdrew
T = tied

=== Summary ===
Tournament	Wins	2nd	3rd	Top-5	Top-10	Top-25	Events	Cuts made
Chevron Championship	1	1	1	3	3	5	16	6
U.S. Women's Open	0	0	0	0	1	2	13	6
Women's PGA Championship	2	0	0	2	2	5	15	7
The Evian Championship	0	0	0	0	0	0	5	1
Women's British Open	2	1	0	3	3	5	14	9
Totals	5	2	1	8	9	17	63	29

- Most consecutive cuts made – 15 (2009 British Open – 2013 LPGA)
- Longest streak of top-10s – 4 (2010 U.S. Open – 2011 LPGA)

== LPGA Tour career summary ==
Year	Tournaments played	Cuts made*	Wins	2nd	3rd	Top 10s	Best finish	Earnings ($)	Money list rank	Scoring average	Scoring rank
2004	1	1	0	0	0	0	T33	n/a		71.50	
2005	1	0	0	0	0	0	MC	n/a		77.00	
2006	1	0	0	0	0	0	MC	n/a		76.00	
2007	1	1	0	0	0	1	T6	64,909	n/a	69.00	n/a
2008	28	27	1	5	2	10	1	1,752,086	3	70.77	4
2009	27	26	1	3	0	14	1	1,293,755	7	70.44	5
2010	20	19	3	1	2	8	1	1,573,529	4	70.66	8
2011	22	21	7	2	1	14	1	2,921,713	1	69.66	1
2012	24	21	3	0	3	11	1	1,430,159	4	71.12	15
2013	23	17	0	1	1	4	2	405,068	38	71.71	35
2014	24	18	0	1	0	2	T2	303,127	54	72.19	65
2015	27	18	0	3	0	4	T2	648,400	21	71.52	36
2016	25	13	0	0	0	0	T16	70,910	109	73.22	131
2017	25	10	0	0	0	0	T11	107,504	99	72.68	138
2018	20	7	0	0	0	0	T27	45,137	135	72.19	95
2019	5	0	0	0	0	0	MC	0	n/a	76.44	n/a
2020	Did not play										
2021	9	0	0	0	0	0	MC	0	n/a	78.44	n/a
2022	Did not play										
2023	Did not play										
2024	11	0	0	0	0	0	MC	0	n/a	75.86	162
2025	9	1	0	0	0	0	T63	20,485	165	74.72	n/a
Totals ^	300	197	15	16	9	68	1	10,571,873	29		

^ official as of 2025 season
* Includes matchplay and other events without a cut.

== World ranking ==
Position in Women's World Golf Rankings at the end of each calendar year.

Year	World ranking	Source
2007	134	
2008	2	
2009	5	
2010	5	
2011	1	
2012	1	
2013	34	
2014	83	
2015	38	
2016	102	
2017	217	
2018	328	
2019	666	
2020	899	
2021	unranked	
2022	unranked	
2023	unranked	
2024	946	
2025	242	

== Team appearances ==
Amateur

- Espirito Santo Trophy (representing Taiwan): 2004, 2006

Professional

- Lexus Cup (representing Asia team): 2008
- International Crown (representing Chinese Taipei): 2014, 2016

== See also ==
- List of golfers with most LPGA major championship wins
- List of golfers with most LPGA Tour wins
