= HSBC Brazil Cup =

Golf tournament formerly on the LPGA Tour

Coordinates: 22.9945°S 43.3075°W

HSBC LPGA Brasil Cup
Tournament information
- Location: Rio de Janeiro, Brazil
- Established: 2009
- Course: Itanhanga Golf Club
- Par: 73
- Length: 6,285 yards (5,747 m)
- Tour: LPGA Tour (exhibition)
- Format: Stroke play - 36 holes
- Prize fund: $720,000
- Final year: 2012

Tournament record score
- Aggregate: 133 Pornanong Phatlum (2012)
- To par: –13 Pornanong Phatlum (2012)

Final champion
- (Thailand) Pornanong Phatlum

The HSBC Brazil Cup was an international golf exhibition tournament, sanctioned by the LPGA Tour and first played in 2009. The tournament took place over two days and 36 holes at the Itanhanga Golf Club in Rio de Janeiro, Brazil. The money earned did not count on the official LPGA money list, making the event an unofficial part of the LPGA Tour.

The field for the inaugural event in January 2009 included only 15 players: 14 LPGA Tour members and a Brazilian amateur. In 2010, the field was expanded to 27 players, which included two amateurs, and was moved to late May. The 2011 tournament included thirty players, all professionals.

The tournament title sponsor was HSBC, the world's largest banking group, with headquarters in London.

Tournament names through the years:

- 2009–12: HSBC LPGA Brasil Cup

== Winners ==
Year	Dates	Champion	Score	To par	Margin of victory	Runner-up	Tournament location	Purse ($)	Winner's share ($)
2012	May 5–6	(Thailand) Pornanong Phatlum	66-67=133	–13	4 strokes	(Taiwan) Amy Hung	Itanhanga Golf Club, par 73	720,000	108,000
2011	May 28–29	(Colombia) Mariajo Uribe	69-66=135	–9	1 stroke	(Australia) Lindsey Wright	Itanhanga Golf Club, par 72	720,000	108,000
2010	May 29–30	(United States) Meaghan Francella	69-71=140	–6	Playoff ^{1}	(Colombia) Mariajo Uribe	Itanhanga Golf Club, par 73	700,000	105,000
2009	Jan 24–25	(Scotland) Catriona Matthew	69-69=138	–6	5 strokes	(United States) Kristy McPherson	Itanhanga Golf Club, par 72	500,000	100,000

^{1} Won on the sixth playoff hole.

== Tournament record ==
Year	Player	Score	Round
2011	(Colombia) Mariajo Uribe	66 (–6)	2nd
