= Katherine Kirk =

Australian professional golfer (born 1982)

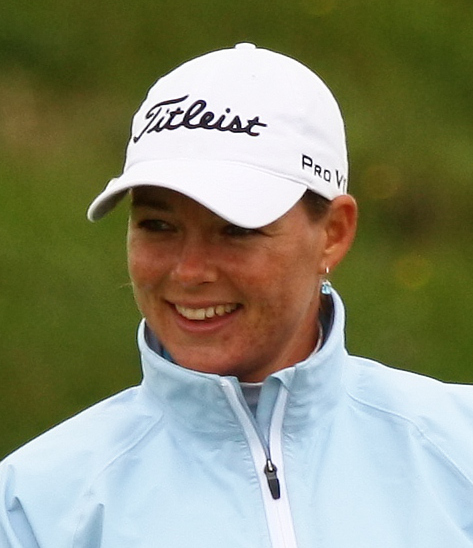
- Hull-Kirk at the 2010 Women's British Open

Personal information
- Nationality: Australia
- Born: 26 February 1982 (age 44) Brisbane, Queensland, Australia
- Height: 1.77 m (5 ft 10 in)
- Spouse: Tom Kirk (m. 2012)

Career
- Sport: Golf
- College: Pepperdine University (graduated 2003)
- Turned professional: 2003
- Former tours: LPGA Tour (2004–2022); ALPG Tour; Futures Tour (2003)
- Professional wins: 11

Number of wins by tour
- LPGA Tour: 3
- Ladies European Tour: 1
- WPGA Tour of Australasia: 6
- Epson Tour: 2

Best results in LPGA major championships
- Chevron Championship: T8: 2009
- Women's PGA C'ship: T16: 2009
- U.S. Women's Open: T25: 2007
- Women's British Open: 2nd: 2010
- Evian Championship: T3: 2017

Achievements and awards
- Dinah Shore Award: 2003
- William and Mousie Powell Award: 2017

Katherine Kirk (born 26 February 1982) is an Australian professional golfer who played on the U.S.-based LPGA Tour and the ALPG Tour. She played under her maiden name, Katherine Hull, until her marriage to Tom Kirk on 2 August 2012 and also under the name Katherine Hull-Kirk.

== Amateur career ==
Hull began playing golf at age 12 in her native Australia. She attended Pepperdine University in Malibu, California, where she was an All-American in 2002–03 and was the NCAA Player of the Year in 2003. She collected eight collegiate wins during her career. Hull graduated from college in 2003 with a degree in Sports Administration.

== Professional career ==
After graduating from college in 2003, Hull turned professional, playing on the Duramed Futures Tour. She won her first two events as a professional, the Aurora Health Care FUTURES Charity Golf Classic, and the Lima Memorial Hospital Foundation FUTURES Classic the next week. She finished tied for 42nd at the final LPGA Qualifying Tournament in 2003 to earn non-exempt status on the LPGA Tour for 2004. In 2006, Hull won two events on the Australian Ladies Professional Golf Tour (ALPG), and also earned full playing privileges on the LGPA Tour for 2007 after returning to the LPGA Qualifying Tour

Hull's breakout year as a professional was 2008. She earned her first win on the LPGA Tour at the Canadian Women's Open and went on to record eight top-10 finishes during the season, including seven top 10s in her last ten events played. She finished 13th on the official LPGA money list.

She opened the 2009 season with a win in the ANZ Ladies Masters, a tournament co-sanctioned by the ALPG and the Ladies European Tour and finished on top of the Order of Merit for 2008/09 on the ALPG.

== Professional wins (11) ==
=== LPGA Tour (3) ===
No.	Date	Tournament	Winning score	To par	Margin of victory	Runner-up
1	17 Aug 2008	CN Canadian Women's Open	71-65-72-69=277	–11	1 stroke	(South Korea) Se Ri Pak
2	10 Oct 2010	Navistar LPGA Classic	68-67-67-67=269	–19	1 stroke	(United States) Brittany Lincicome
3	9 Jul 2017	Thornberry Creek LPGA Classic	68-63-65-70=266	–22	1 stroke	(South Africa) Ashleigh Buhai

=== ALPG Tour (6) ===
No.	Date	Tournament	Winning score	To par	Margin of victory	Runner-up
1	20 Feb 2005	Titanium Enterprises ALPG Players Championship	69-69-70=208	–8	3 strokes	(New Zealand) Lynnette Brooky
2	20 Nov 2005	Eden Country Club Pro-Am	66	–6	1 stroke	(Australia) Tamara Johns
3	25 Nov 2005	Sapphire Coast Ladies Classic	71-66=137	–9	5 strokes	(Australia) Tamara Johns
4	8 Feb 2009	ANZ Ladies Masters*	69-67-68-68=272	–16	5 strokes	(Australia) Tamie Durdin
5	14 Jan 2011	Moss Vale Golf Club Ladies Classic	65-66=131	–10	2 strokes	(Australia) Stephanie Na
6	17 Jan 2011	Mount Broughton Classic	68-66=134	–10	3 strokes	(Australia) Vicky Thomas

* Co-sanctioned with Ladies European Tour

=== Futures Tour (2) ===
No.	Date	Tournament	Winning score	To par	Margin of victory	Runner-up	Winner's share ($)
1	1 Jun 2003	Aurora Health Care FUTURES Charity Golf Classic	71-70-69=210	–6	Playoff	(South Korea) Ju Kim	9,800
2	8 Jun 2003	Lima Memorial Hospital Foundation FUTURES Classic	66-66-73=205	–11	1 stroke	(Canada) Isabelle Beisiegel	8,400

== Results in LPGA majors ==
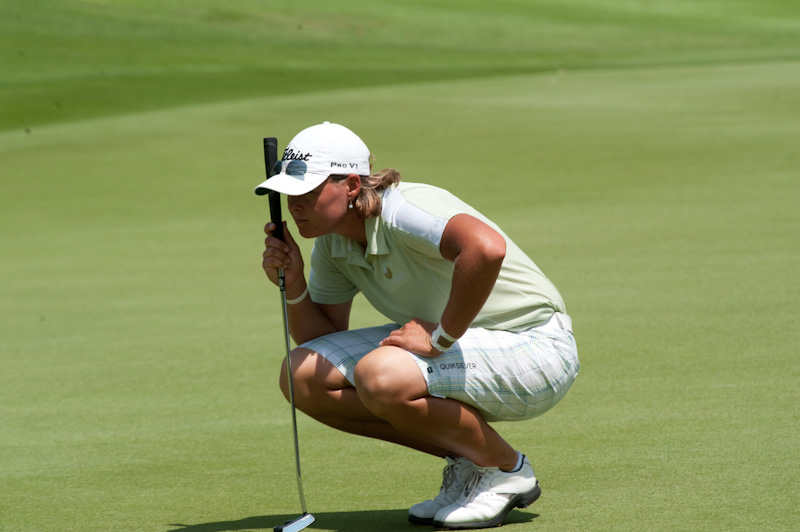
Hull during HSBC Womens Championship, 2009

Results not in chronological order before 2019.

Tournament	2003	2004	2005	2006	2007	2008	2009	2010	2011	2012
Chevron Championship			T58	T66		T38	T8	T24	69	T20
U.S. Women's Open	CUT	51	CUT		T25	T42	CUT	T41	CUT	T57
Women's PGA Championship			T72	CUT	T62	CUT	T16	T34	T57	T51
Women's British Open		T50	CUT		CUT	T48	T40	2		T33

Tournament	2013	2014	2015	2016	2017	2018	2019	2020	2021	2022
Chevron Championship	CUT	CUT	T46			CUT	T17	T7	CUT	
U.S. Women's Open	CUT	T49	CUT		T48	CUT	T34	CUT		
Women's PGA Championship	CUT	CUT	CUT	T46	T59	CUT	CUT	T54	CUT	CUT
The Evian Championship ^	T15	T36			T3	T10	T30	NT	CUT	
Women's British Open	T22				T63	CUT	CUT	T22	CUT	

^ The Evian Championship was added as a major in 2013

Top 10
Did not play

CUT = missed the half-way cut
NT = no tournament
T = tied

=== Summary ===
Tournament	Wins	2nd	3rd	Top-5	Top-10	Top-25	Events	Cuts made
Chevron Championship	0	0	0	0	2	5	14	10
U.S. Women's Open	0	0	0	0	0	1	16	8
Women's PGA Championship	0	0	0	0	0	1	18	9
The Evian Championship	0	0	1	1	2	3	6	5
Women's British Open	0	1	0	1	1	3	13	8
Totals	0	1	1	2	4	13	67	40

- Most consecutive cuts made – 7 (2009 British Open – 2011 LPGA)
- Longest streak of top-10s – 1 (five times)

== LPGA Tour career summary ==
Year	Tournaments played	Cuts made	Wins	2nd	3rd	Top 10s	Best finish	Earnings ($)	Money list rank	Scoring average	Scoring rank
2003	4	3	0	0	0	0	T22	13,767	n/a	73.91	
2004	18	13	0	0	0	2	6	156,760	69	71.86	42
2005	24	14	0	1	0	2	2	201,676	55	73.90	104
2006	22	5	0	0	0	0	T34	20,359	146	75.08	152
2007	24	15	0	0	0	2	T9	187,008	60	72.90	48
2008	30	22	1	1	0	8	1	1,045,619	13	71.51	17
2009	25	20	0	1	0	3	2	461,820	27	71.67	27
2010	18	15	1	1	0	4	1	793,412	12	71.40	20
2011	18	13	0	0	0	1	T6	137,884	60	73.23	74
2012	26	21	0	1	0	3	2	376,192	37	72.44	53
2013	26	17	0	0	0	1	T8	223,138	56	72.35	59
2014	26	21	0	0	0	2	T4	265,743	60	72.09	61
2015	21	9	0	0	0	0	T16	55,312	108	73.08	111
2016	17	9	0	0	0	0	T21	70,621	110	72.27	78
2017	24	17	1	0	1	3	1	678,831	29	71.56	63
2018	27	20	0	0	0	2	4	310,212	64	71.63	61
2019	27	18	0	0	0	1	T5	350,857	57	71.13	41
2020	15	11	0	0	0	4	T6	295,584	39	71.35	29
2021	23	16	0	0	0	0	T25	143,655	94	71.33	67
2022	10	4	0	0	0	0	T21	26,917	168	72.71	134

- official through 2022 season

== Futures Tour summary ==
Year	Tournaments played	Cuts made	Wins	Top 10s	Best finish	Earnings ($)	Money list rank	Scoring average	Scoring rank
2003	10	9	2	4	1	27,614	9	71.64	5

- joined in late May at mid-season

== Team appearances ==
Amateur

- Espirito Santo Trophy (representing Australia): 2002 (winners)

Professional

- Lexus Cup (representing International team): 2008 (winners)
- International Crown (representing Australia): 2014, 2018
- The Queens (representing Australia): 2015, 2016, 2017
