= 2011 Women's British Open =

Golf tournament

Coordinates: 56.497°N 2.717°W

2011 Ricoh Women's British Open
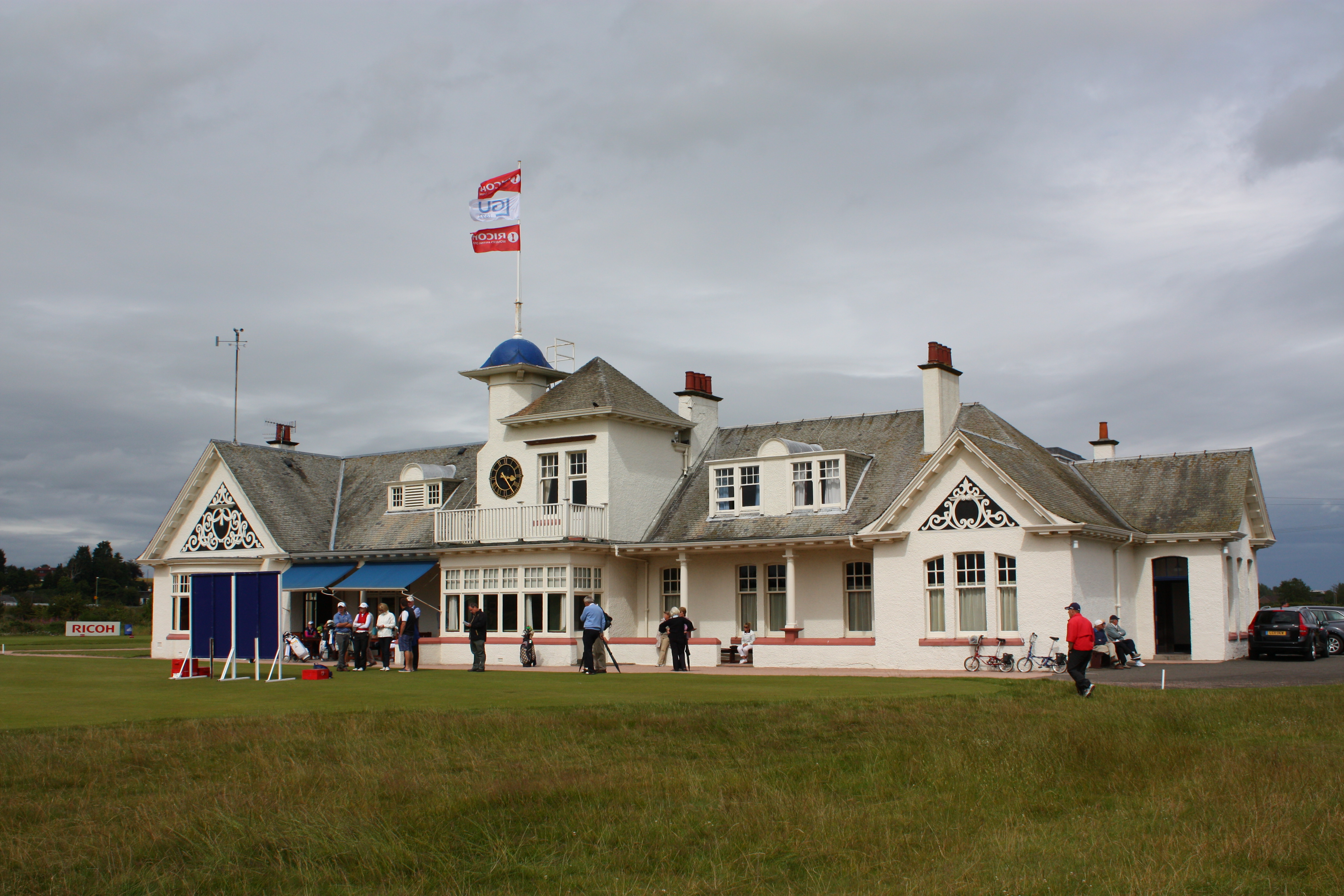
- Clubhouse pictured at the 2011 Women's British Open

Tournament information
- Dates: 28–31 July 2011
- Location: Angus, Scotland
- Course: Carnoustie Golf Links
- Organized by: Ladies' Golf Union
- Tours: Ladies European Tour; LPGA Tour

Statistics
- Par: 72
- Length: 6,490 yards (5,934 m)
- Field: 144 players, 68 after cut
- Cut: 145 (+1)
- Prize fund: $2,500,000 €1,736,432
- Winner's share: $392,133 €272,365

Champion
- (Taiwan) Yani Tseng
- 272 (−16)

Location in Scotland

The 2011 Ricoh Women's British Open was held 28–31 July at Carnoustie Golf Links in Angus, Scotland. It was the 35th Women's British Open, and the 11th as a major championship on the LPGA Tour. This was the first time for the Women's British Open at Carnoustie, which previously hosted seven Open Championships, most recently in 2007.

Yani Tseng became the first to successfully defend her title at the Women's British Open as a major championship, four strokes ahead of runner-up Brittany Lang. She became youngest player, male or female, to win five major titles.

== Exemptions and qualifying events ==
The field for the tournament was 144, and golfers gained a place in three ways. Most players earned exemptions based on good past performances on the Ladies European Tour, the LPGA and in previous major championships and top-ranked players in the Women's World Golf Rankings. The rest of the field earned entry by successfully competing in qualifying tournaments open to any professional female golfer or amateur with a low handicap.

There were 14 exemption categories for the 2011 Women's British Open. These included:

- The top 15 finishers (and ties) from the 2010 Women's British Open.
- The top 10 Ladies European Tour members in the Women's World Golf Rankings who did not finish in the top 15 of the 2010 Women's British Open.
- The top 30 LPGA Tour members in the Women's World Golf Rankings who did not finish in the top 15 of the 2010 Women's British Open.
- The top 25 on the current LET money list not already exempt from the 2010 Women's British Open or the world rankings.
- The top 40 on the current LPGA Tour money list not already exempt from the 2010 Women's British Open or the world rankings.
- The top five on the current LPGA of Japan Tour money list not already exempt from the 2010 Women's British Open or through the world rankings if they are also members of the LET or LPGA. (Note that these six categories have accounted for approximately 125 entries — or 5/6ths of the players in the final field.)
- Winners of any recognised LET or LPGA events in the calendar year 2011.
- The champions from the last 10 editions of the Women's British Open.
- The champions of the last five editions of one of the other three LPGA majors.

== Course ==
The 2011 course layout at Carnoustie Golf Links.

Hole	1	2	3	4	5	6	7	8	9	Out	10	11	12	13	14	15	16	17	18	In	Total
Yards	394	396	320	369	358	490	381	156	406	3,270	403	347	405	141	467	425	213	433	386	3,220	6,490
Par	4	4	4	4	4	5	4	3	4	36	4	4	4	3	5	4	3	5	4	36	72

=== Set-up ===
The par-72 course was set by the Ladies Golf Union (LGU) at 6,490 yards (5,934 m), 931 yards (851 m) shorter than the par-71 set-up for the 2007 Open Championship.

The short set-up of the course was criticized by several notable golfers and golf commentators. ESPN golf commentator and former LPGA pro Jane Crafter called the LGU "out of touch" with how current women players can play. Defending champion Yani Tseng commented that the famous hole number 18 was set up so that it "put all of the bunkers out of play, put all of the burns out of play." The course groundskeeper agreed that the women had been given "a watered-down version" of Carnoustie and that he did that intentionally after receiving too much criticism for a difficult set-up for the Open Championship in 1999.

== Round summaries ==
=== First round ===
Thursday, 28 July 2011

Place	Player	Score	To par
1	(South Korea) Meena Lee	65	−7
2	(United States) Brittany Lincicome	67	−5
T3	(Sweden) Sophie Gustafson	68	−4
T3	(Germany) Caroline Masson	68	−4
T3	(United States) Angela Stanford	68	−4
T3	(South Korea) Amy Yang	68	−4
T7	(South Korea) Na Yeon Choi	69	−3
T7	(United States) Paula Creamer	69	−3
T7	(Sweden) Caroline Hedwall	69	−3
T7	(Taiwan) Amy Hung	69	−3
T7	(Canada) Lorie Kane	69	−3
T7	(South Korea) Song-Hee Kim	69	−3
T7	(Japan) Mika Miyazato	69	−3
T7	(Japan) Momoko Ueda	69	−3

=== Second round ===
Friday, 29 July 2011

Place	Player	R1	R2	Total	To par
1	(Germany) Caroline Masson	68	65	133	−11
T2	(South Korea) Meena Lee	65	69	134	−10
T2	(South Korea) Inbee Park	70	64	134	−10
T4	(South Korea) Na Yeon Choi	69	67	136	−8
T4	(South Korea) Se Ri Pak	72	64	136	−8
T4	(Netherlands) Dewi Claire Schreefel	70	66	136	−8
7	(Taiwan) Yani Tseng	71	66	137	−7
T8	(Sweden) Caroline Hedwall	69	69	138	−6
T8	(United States) Brittany Lincicome	67	71	138	−6
T8	(Japan) Mika Miyazato	69	69	138	−6
T8	(South Korea) Amy Yang	68	70	138	−6

Amateurs: Kang (−3), Popov (+1), Pretswell (+2), Taylor (+4), Foster (+6), Meadow (+7).

=== Third round ===
Saturday, 30 July 2011

Place	Player	R1	R2	R3	Total	To par
1	(Germany) Caroline Masson	68	65	68	201	−15
2	(Taiwan) Yani Tseng	71	66	66	203	−13
T3	(Scotland) Catriona Matthew	70	69	68	207	−9
T3	(South Korea) Inbee Park	70	64	73	207	−9
5	(South Korea) Na Yeon Choi	69	67	72	208	−8
T6	(Sweden) Sophie Gustafson	68	71	70	209	−7
T6	(United States) Brittany Lang	70	70	69	209	−7
T6	(South Korea) Se Ri Pak	72	64	73	209	−7
T9	(United States) Paula Creamer	69	70	71	210	−6
T9	(Japan) Mika Miyazato	69	69	72	210	−6
T9	(Sweden) Anna Nordqvist	70	71	69	210	−6
T9	(Netherlands) Dewi Claire Schreefel	70	66	74	210	−6
T9	(South Korea) Sun Young Yoo	71	70	69	210	−6

=== Final round ===
Sunday, 31 July 2011

Place	Player	R1	R2	R3	R4	Total	To par	Money ($)
1	(Taiwan) Yani Tseng	71	66	66	69	272	−16	392,133
2	(United States) Brittany Lang	70	70	69	67	276	−12	231,065
3	(Sweden) Sophie Gustafson	68	71	70	68	277	−11	161,746
4	(South Korea) Amy Yang	68	70	73	67	278	−10	126,536
T5	(Germany) Caroline Masson	68	65	68	78	279	−9	96,828
T5	(Scotland) Catriona Matthew	70	69	68	72	279	−9	96,828
T7	(South Korea) Na Yeon Choi	69	67	72	72	280	−8	70,695
T7	(Sweden) Anna Nordqvist	70	71	69	70	280	−8	70,695
T7	(South Korea) Inbee Park	70	64	73	73	280	−8	70,695
T7	(South Korea) Sun Young Yoo	71	70	69	70	280	−8	70,695

Amateurs: Kang (+2), Popov (+11).

==== Scorecard ====
Final round

Hole	1	2	3	4	5	6	7	8	9	10	11	12	13	14	15	16	17	18
Par	4	4	4	4	4	5	4	3	4	4	4	4	3	5	4	3	5	4
(Taiwan) Tseng	−12	−12	−13	−13	−13	−14	−14	−14	−14	−14	−15	−14	−13	−14	−14	−14	−15	−16
(United States) Lang	−7	−7	−7	−7	−7	−7	−8	−7	−8	−8	−9	−10	−10	−11	−11	−11	−12	−12
(Sweden) Gustafson	−7	−7	−7	−7	−7	−9	−9	−9	−9	−8	−8	−8	−8	−9	−9	−9	−10	−11
(South Korea) Yang	−4	−4	−5	−5	−5	−6	−6	−6	−7	−8	−8	−8	−8	−9	−9	−9	−10	−10
(Germany) Masson	−15	−14	−13	−13	−13	−13	−12	−12	−12	−11	−10	−8	−8	−8	−7	−7	−8	−9
(Scotland) Matthew	−9	−9	−9	−9	−9	−10	−10	−10	−11	−11	−11	−11	−11	−11	−11	−11	−11	−9

Cumulative tournament scores, relative to par

Eagle	Birdie	Bogey	Double bogey
