= 2008 LPGA Championship =

Tournament information
- Dates: June 5–8, 2008
- Location: Havre de Grace, Maryland; 39.542°N 76.133°W
- Course: Bulle Rock Golf Course
- Tour: LPGA Tour
- Format: Stroke play - 72 holes

Statistics
- Par: 72
- Length: 6,641 yards (6,073 m)
- Field: 150 players, 81 after cut
- Cut: 144 (Even)
- Prize fund: $2.0 million
- Winner's share: $300,000

Champion
- (Taiwan) Yani Tseng
- 276 (−12), playoff
- Location in United States Location in Maryland

The 2008 LPGA Championship was the 54th LPGA Championship, played June 5–8 at Bulle Rock Golf Course in Havre de Grace, Maryland. This was the second of four major championships on the LPGA Tour in 2008.

The champion was tour rookie Yani Tseng, age 19, with a playoff victory over Maria Hjorth. The two finished regulation play at 276 (−12), one stroke ahead of Annika Sörenstam and Lorena Ochoa. Tseng birdied the fourth extra hole for her first career win on the LPGA Tour and became the first rookie to win a major in a decade.

This championship was played at Bulle Rock for five consecutive seasons, 2005 through 2009.

== Round summaries ==
=== First round ===
Thursday, June 5, 2008

Place	Player	Score	To par
T1	(United States) Emily Bastel	66	−6
T1	(Canada) Lorie Kane	66	−6
3	(Australia) Lindsey Wright	67	−5
T4	(Colombia) Marisa Baena	68	−4
T4	(United States) Nicole Castrale	68	−4
T4	(United States) Rachel Hetherington	68	−4
T4	(Sweden) Maria Hjorth	68	−4
T4	(South Korea) Jin-joo Hong	68	−4
T9	(South Korea) Hye Jung Choi	69	−3
T9	(Australia) Wendy Doolan	69	−3
T9	(South Korea) Hee-won Han	69	−3
T9	(South Korea) Soo-yun Kang	69	−3
T9	(South Korea) Young Kim	69	−3
T9	(United States) Kelli Kuehne	69	−3
T9	(Mexico) Lorena Ochoa	69	−3
T9	(South Korea) Ji-young Oh	69	−3
T9	(South Korea) Inbee Park	69	−3

=== Second round ===
Friday, June 6, 2008

Place	Player	Score	To par
1	(Mexico) Lorena Ochoa	69-65=134	−10
2	(Australia) Lindsey Wright	67-68=135	−9
3	(Canada) Lorie Kane	66-70=136	−8
T4	(United States) Rachel Hetherington	68-69=137	−7
T4	(United States) Brittany Lang	70-67=137	−7
T4	(South Korea) Ji-young Oh	69-68=137	−7
T7	(Colombia) Marisa Baena	68-70=138	−6
T7	(Australia) Michelle Ellis	71-67=138	−6
T7	(South Korea) Jin-joo Hong	68-70=138	−6
T7	(Sweden) Annika Sörenstam	70-68=138	−6

=== Third round ===
Saturday, June 7, 2008

Place	Player	Score	To par
1	(South Korea) Jee-young Lee	70-69-65=204	−12
2	(Sweden) Maria Hjorth	68-72-65=205	−11
T3	(Mexico) Lorena Ochoa	69-65-72=206	−10
T3	(Sweden) Annika Sörenstam	70-68-68=206	−10
T5	(United States) Laura Diaz	71-68-69=208	−8
T5	(United States) Brittany Lang	70-67-71=208	−8
T5	(Australia) Lindsey Wright	67-68-73=208	−8
T5	(Taiwan) Yani Tseng	73-70-65=208	−8
T9	(Colombia) Marisa Baena	68-70-71=209	−7
T9	(United States) Irene Cho	72-68-69=209	−7
T9	(South Korea) Ji-young Oh	69-68-72=209	−7

=== Final round ===
Sunday, June 8, 2008

Place	Player	Score	To par	Money ($)
T1	(Taiwan) Yani Tseng	73-70-65-68=276	−12	Playoff
T1	(Sweden) Maria Hjorth	68-72-65-71=276	−12	Playoff
T3	(Mexico) Lorena Ochoa	69-65-72-71=277	−11	115,911
T3	(Sweden) Annika Sörenstam	70-68-68-71=277	−11	115,911
5	(United States) Laura Diaz	71-68-69-70=278	−10	81,385
T6	(South Korea) Shi Hyun Ahn	73-69-69-69=280	−8	53,763
T6	(United States) Irene Cho	72-68-69-71=280	−8	53,763
T6	(United States) Kelli Kuehne	69-70-71-70=280	−8	53,763
T6	(United States) Morgan Pressel	73-69-70-68=280	−8	53,763
T10	(United States) Nicole Castrale	68-72-71-70=281	−7	31,938
T10	(United States) Paula Creamer	71-70-71-69=281	−7	31,938
T10	(South Korea) Jimin Jeong	73-68-69-71=281	−7	31,938
T10	(United States) Cristie Kerr	71-70-71-69=281	−7	31,938
T10	(South Korea) Mi Hyun Kim	72-70-71-68=281	−7	31,938
T10	(United States) Candie Kung	70-72-70-69=281	−7	31,938
T10	(South Korea) Seon Hwa Lee	73-71-70-67=281	−7	31,938
T10	(Italy) Giulia Sergas	71-71-69-70=281	−7	31,938

==== Scorecard ====
Final round

Hole	1	2	3	4	5	6	7	8	9	10	11	12	13	14	15	16	17	18
Par	4	5	3	4	4	4	3	5	4	4	5	3	4	4	5	4	3	4
(Taiwan) Tseng	−9	−9	−10	−10	−11	−11	−11	−12	−12	−12	−12	−12	−11	−12	−12	−12	−12	−12
(Sweden) Hjorth	−11	−11	−11	−12	−11	−11	−12	−12	−12	−13	−13	−13	−11	−11	−12	−13	−12	−12
(Mexico) Ochoa	−11	−11	−11	−11	−11	−11	−11	−11	−11	−11	−11	−10	−9	−9	−9	−10	−10	−11
(Sweden) Sörenstam	−11	−11	−11	−11	−12	−12	−12	−12	−12	−12	−12	−12	−11	−11	−11	−11	−11	−11
(United States) Diaz	−8	−9	−9	−9	−9	−9	−9	−10	−10	−10	−11	−11	−11	−11	−11	−11	−10	−10
(South Korea) J-y Lee	−11	−11	−11	−10	−9	−10	−10	−10	−10	−11	−11	−11	−9	−9	−6	−6	−6	−6

Cumulative tournament scores, relative to par

Birdie	Bogey	Double bogey	Triple bogey+

=== Playoff ===
Place	Player	Score	To par	Money ($)
1	(Taiwan) Yani Tseng	4-4-3-3	−1	300,000
2	(Sweden) Maria Hjorth	4-4-3-4	E	180,180

==== Scorecard ====
Hole	18	16	17	18
Par	4	4	3	4
(Taiwan) Tseng	E	E	E	−1
(Sweden) Hjorth	E	E	E	E

Cumulative playoff scores, relative to par
