= 2011 LPGA Tour =

Golf tour season

2011 LPGA Tour season
- Duration: February 17, 2011 – November 20, 2011
- Number of official events: 23
- Most wins: 7 (Taiwan) Yani Tseng
- Money leader: (Taiwan) Yani Tseng
- Rolex Player of the Year: (Taiwan) Yani Tseng
- Vare Trophy: (Taiwan) Yani Tseng
- Rookie of the Year: (South Korea) Hee-kyung Seo

The 2011 LPGA Tour was a series of weekly golf tournaments for elite female golfers from around the world that began in Thailand on February 17, 2011, and had its last official event end on November 20, 2011, in Florida. The tournaments were sanctioned by the United States–based Ladies Professional Golf Association (LPGA).

== Season overview ==
There were 23 official tournaments on the 2011 LPGA, the lowest number in nearly 40 years. More events were held outside of the United States, with eleven different countries hosting tournaments, the highest number in the history of the LPGA Tour. Thirteen tournaments were held in the United States, the lowest number in several decades.

Yani Tseng from Taiwan, was the dominant player on the 2011 Tour. She won seven of the 22 tournaments in which she played and had fourteen top-10 finishes. Her wins in the Women's British Open and the LPGA Championship made her the youngest player ever, male or female, to win five career major tournaments. She won the LPGA money list title with $2,921,713 in official earnings; American Cristie Kerr finished second with $1,470,979.

Tseng also won the Player of the Year award and the Vare Trophy given to the player with the lowest scoring average for the season. Korean Hee Kyung Seo won the Rookie of the Year award.

== Changes in the 2011 season ==
- Three new events were announced at the start of the season: the RR Donnelley LPGA Founders Cup in Arizona in March, the Imperial Springs LPGA in China in August, and the Sunrise LPGA Taiwan Championship in October. The Imperial Springs event was postponed from early August to late September, then canceled outright on September 13.
- The new RR Donnelley LPGA Founders Cup, held in honor of the LPGA's founders, did not have a cash purse. Instead, a $1 million mock purse was awarded. This purse counted toward the players' annual money list standings, and the event carried a full points allocation toward the World Golf Rankings and LPGA season award races. The sponsor matched the $1 million purse with a donation to charity: $500,000 to LPGA-USGA Girls Golf program and $500,000 to charities of each player's choice for the top ten finishers.
- The CME Group Titleholders, the successor to the LPGA Tour Championship, had a field made up of three qualifiers from each official tour event—specifically the top three finishers who have not already qualified for the Titleholders.
- The Tres Marias Championship, scheduled for April in Mexico, was canceled in late January because of security concerns; this created a three-week gap in the LPGA schedule.
- The Jamie Farr Owens Corning Classic was not played in 2011, but will return for 2012 through 2014. The Toledo area hosted the 2011 U.S. Senior Open, a major championship on the Champions Tour.

== Schedule and results ==
- The number in parentheses after winners' names show the player's total number wins in official money individual events on the LPGA Tour, including that event.
- The "Titleholders qualifiers" column indicates the three golfers at each official event who qualify for the season-ending tournament, the CME Group Titleholders.

Date	Tournament	Location	Winner	First prize ($)	Titleholders qualifiers
Feb 20	Honda LPGA Thailand	Thailand	(Taiwan) Yani Tseng (6)	225,000	(Taiwan) Yani Tseng (United States) Michelle Wie (Australia) Karrie Webb
Feb 27	HSBC Women's Champions	Singapore	(Australia) Karrie Webb (37)	210,000	(South Korea) Sun Young Yoo (United States) Morgan Pressel (South Korea) Na Yeon Choi
Mar 20	RR Donnelley LPGA Founders Cup	Arizona	(Australia) Karrie Webb (38)	200,000 donation	(United States) Brittany Lincicome (United States) Paula Creamer (United States) Cristie Kerr
Mar 27	Kia Classic	California	(Germany) Sandra Gal (1)	255,000	(Germany) Sandra Gal (South Korea) Jiyai Shin (South Korea) I.K. Kim
Apr 3	**Kraft Nabisco Championship**	California	(United States) **Stacy Lewis** (1)	300,000	(United States) Stacy Lewis (United States) Katie Futcher (United States) Angela Stanford
Apr 24	Tres Marias Championship	Mexico	Tournament canceled		
May 1	Avnet LPGA Classic	Alabama	(Sweden) Maria Hjorth (5)	195,000	(Sweden) Maria Hjorth (South Korea) Song-Hee Kim (Norway) Suzann Pettersen
May 22	Sybase Match Play Championship	New Jersey	(Norway) Suzann Pettersen (7)	375,000	(Sweden) Sophie Gustafson (Japan) Ai Miyazato (Paraguay) Julieta Granada
May 29	HSBC Brazil Cup (Note: Prize money is not official.)	Brazil	(Colombia) Mariajo Uribe (n/a)	108,000	n/a
Jun 35	ShopRite LPGA Classic	New Jersey	(United States) Brittany Lincicome (4)	225,000	(Scotland) Catriona Matthew (Sweden) Anna Nordqvist (United States) Brittany Lang
Jun 12	LPGA State Farm Classic	Illinois	(Taiwan) Yani Tseng (7)	255,000	(South Korea) Se Ri Pak (United States) Mindy Kim (United States) Wendy Ward
Jun 26	**Wegmans LPGA Championship**	New York	(Taiwan) **Yani Tseng** (8)	375,000	(South Korea) Meena Lee (Japan) Mika Miyazato (Spain) Azahara Muñoz
Jul 11	**U.S. Women's Open**	Colorado	(South Korea) **So Yeon Ryu** (1)^{1}	585,000	(South Korea) So Yeon Ryu (South Korea) Hee Kyung Seo (South Korea) Inbee Park
Jul 24	Evian Masters	France	(Japan) Ai Miyazato (7)	487,500	(Sweden) Caroline Hedwall (South Korea) Amy Yang (United States) Paige Mackenzie
Jul 31	**Ricoh Women's British Open**	Scotland	(Taiwan) **Yani Tseng** (9)	392,133	(United States) Candie Kung (Netherlands) Dewi Claire Schreefel (England) Karen Stupples
Aug 21	Safeway Classic	Oregon	(Norway) Suzann Pettersen (8)	225,000	(South Korea) Hee Young Park (United States) Vicky Hurst (United States) Ryann O'Toole
Aug 28	CN Canadian Women's Open	Quebec	(United States) Brittany Lincicome (5)	337,500	(South Korea) Hee-Won Han (South Korea) Jenny Shin (United States) Jennifer Johnson
Sep 11	Walmart NW Arkansas Championship	Arkansas	(Taiwan) Yani Tseng (10)	300,000	(Taiwan) Amy Hung (Spain) Belén Mozo (South Korea) Mi-Hyun Kim
Sep 18	Navistar LPGA Classic	Alabama	(United States) Lexi Thompson (1)	195,000	(United States) Lexi Thompson (United States) Tiffany Joh (Italy) Giulia Sergas
Sep 25	Solheim Cup	Ireland	(European Union) Europe	n/a	
Oct 9	LPGA Hana Bank Championship	South Korea	(Taiwan) Yani Tseng (11)	270,000	(South Korea) Jimin Kang (South Korea) Chella Choi (China) Shanshan Feng
Oct 16	Sime Darby LPGA Malaysia	Malaysia	(South Korea) Na Yeon Choi (5)	285,000	(Netherlands) Christel Boeljon (United States) Amanda Blumenherst; Mina Harigae
Oct 23	Sunrise LPGA Taiwan Championship	Taiwan	(Taiwan) Yani Tseng (12)	300,000	(United States) Pat Hurst (United States) Alison Walshe (South Korea) Grace Park
Nov 6	Mizuno Classic	Japan	(Japan) Momoko Ueda (2)	180,000	(Japan) Momoko Ueda (United States) Christina Kim (Thailand) Pornanong Phatlum
Nov 8	Wendy's 3-Tour Challenge	Nevada	Champions Tour	n/a	
Nov 13	Lorena Ochoa Invitational	Mexico	(Scotland) Catriona Matthew (4)	200,000	(United States) Juli Inkster (United States) Natalie Gulbis (Spain) Beatriz Recari
Nov 20	CME Group Titleholders	Florida	(South Korea) Hee Young Park (1)	500,000	n/a

Tournaments in bold are majors.
^{1}Ryu was not an LPGA member at the time of her win and her win was not counted as an official LPGA win.

== Season leaders ==
Money list leaders

Rank	Player	Country	Earnings ($)	Events played
1	Yani Tseng	Taiwan	2,921,713	22
2	Cristie Kerr	United States	1,470,979	22
3	Na Yeon Choi	South Korea	1,357,382	21
4	Stacy Lewis	United States	1,356,211	23
5	Suzann Pettersen	Norway	1,322,770	20
6	Brittany Lincicome	United States	1,154,234	21
7	Angela Stanford	United States	1,017,196	21
8	Ai Miyazato	Japan	1,007,633	19
9	Paula Creamer	United States	926,338	21
10	Amy Yang	South Korea	912,160	22

Full 2011 Official Money List – navigate to "Official Money List"

Scoring average leaders

Rank	Player	Country	Average
1	Yani Tseng	Taiwan	69.66
2	Na Yeon Choi	South Korea	70.53
3	Cristie Kerr	United States	70.71
4	Jiyai Shin	South Korea	70.81
5	Paula Creamer	United States	70.84

Full 2011 Scoring Average List – navigate to "Scoring Average"

== See also ==
- 2011 in golf
- 2011 Ladies European Tour
- 2011 LPGA Futures Tour
