= Choi Na-yeon =

South Korean professional golfer (born 1987)

Na Yeon Choi 최나연
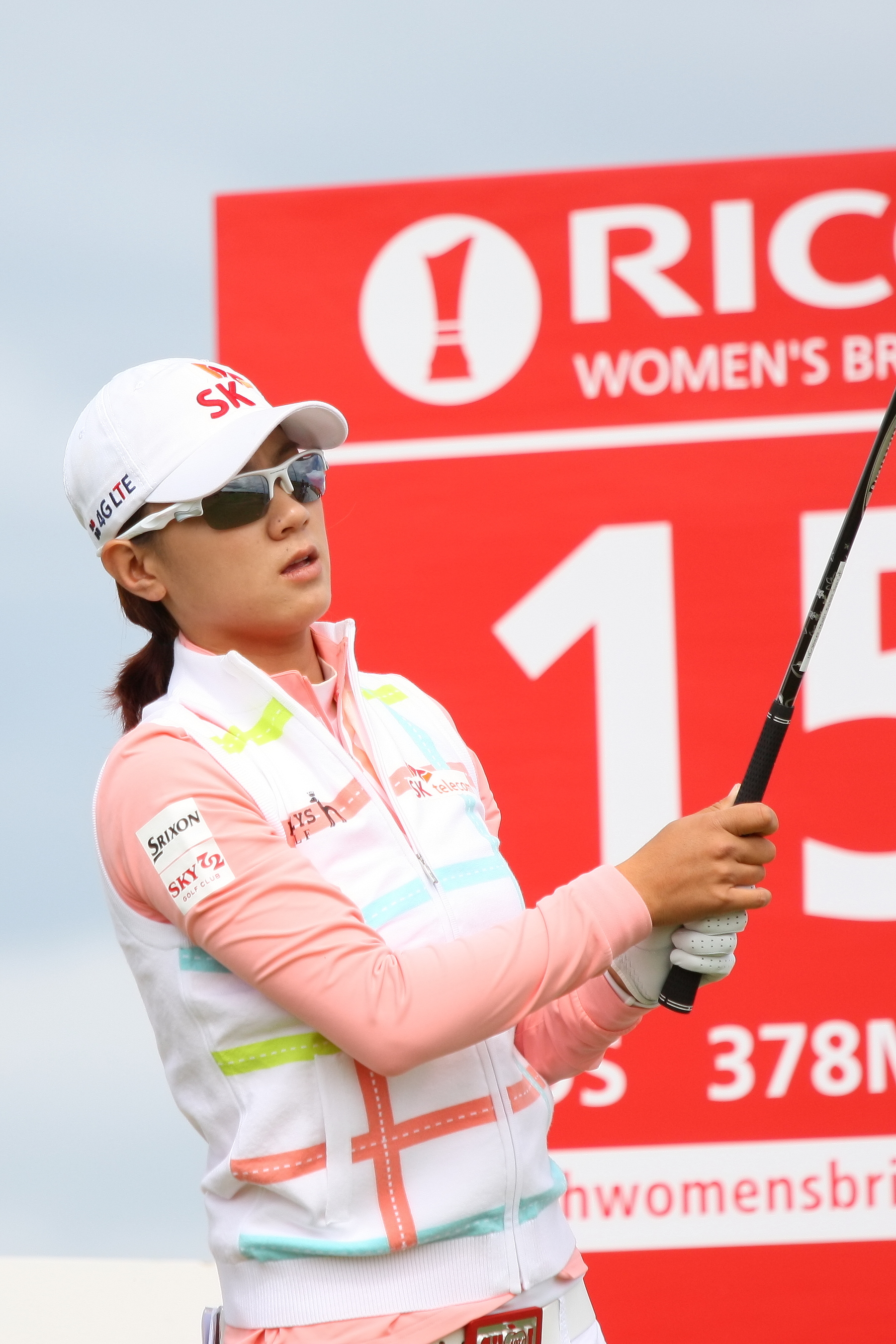
- Choi at the 2013 Women's British Open

Personal information
- Nationality: South Korea
- Born: 28 October 1987 (age 39) Seoul, South Korea
- Height: 1.65 m (5 ft 5 in)

Career
- Sport: Golf
- Turned professional: 2004
- Former tours: LPGA of Korea Tour (joined 2004); LPGA Tour (joined 2008–2022)
- Professional wins: 15

Number of wins by tour
- LPGA Tour: 9
- LPGA of Korea Tour: 8

Best results in LPGA major championships (wins: 1)
- Chevron Championship: T6: 2008
- Women's PGA C'ship: 8th: 2009
- U.S. Women's Open: Won: 2012
- Women's British Open: T2: 2013
- Evian Championship: 5th: 2014

Achievements and awards
- LPGA Vare Trophy: 2010
- LPGA Tour Money Winner: 2010

- Choi Na-yeon
- Hangul: 최나연
- Hanja: 崔蘿蓮
- RR: Choe Nayeon
- MR: Ch'oe Nayŏn

Na Yeon Choi (Korean: 최나연; [tɕʰwe najʌn]; born 28 October 1987) is a South Korean professional golfer who played on the U.S.-based LPGA Tour. In July 2012, she won the U.S. Women's Open for her first major championship.

== Amateur career ==
At age 17 in 2004, Choi won the ADT CAPS Invitational on the LPGA of Korea Tour (KLPGA), beating future Hall-of-Famer Se Ri Pak by four strokes. Choi turned professional shortly thereafter, in November 2004. She won once each year on the KLPGA Tour in 2004 through 2007.

== Professional career ==
In 2007, Choi played in the Hana Bank-KOLON Championship, an event co-sponsored by the LPGA and KLPGA Tours, and finished eighth. She attended LPGA Qualifying Tournament in the fall of 2007, but finished two shots shy of earning a fully exempt Tour card for the 2008 season. Her non-exempt card meant she was not automatically eligible for every event, yet her high conditional status and consistent good play put her in nearly every tournament. She won over $1 million and finished 11th on the 2008 money list with nine top-10 finishes in 27 events played. She finished second in the LPGA Rookie of the Year race, just behind winner Yani Tseng.

In 2009, Choi won twice on the LPGA Tour. In October she won the 20-player Samsung World Championship. Two weeks later she won the Hana Bank-KOLON Championship, an event co-sanctioned with the KLPGA. Her third LPGA Tour win came in July 2010 at the Jamie Farr Owens Corning Classic at which she beat three other players on the second hole of a sudden-death playoff. In 2010, Choi was both the LPGA Tour money leader and the leading scorer (Vare Trophy).

== Professional wins (15) ==
=== LPGA Tour wins (9) ===
Legend
Major championships (1)
Other LPGA Tour (8)

No.	Date	Tournament	Winning score	To par	Margin of victory	Runner(s)-up	Earnings ($)
1	20 Sep 2009	Samsung World Championship	71-67-63-71=272	−16	1 stroke	(Japan) Ai Miyazato	250,000
2	1 Nov 2009	Hana Bank-KOLON Championship	68-71-67=206	−10	1 stroke	(Sweden) Maria Hjorth (Taiwan) Yani Tseng	255,000
3	4 Jul 2010	Jamie Farr Owens Corning Classic	64-67-68-71=270	−14	Playoff	(United States) Christina Kim (South Korea) In-Kyung Kim (South Korea) Song-Hee Kim	150,000
4	31 Oct 2010	LPGA Hana Bank Championship	69-68-69=206	−10	2 strokes	(United States) Vicky Hurst	270,000
5	16 Oct 2011	Sime Darby LPGA Malaysia	66-68-67-68=269	−15	1 stroke	(Taiwan) Yani Tseng	285,000
6	8 Jul 2012	U.S. Women's Open	71-72-65-73=281	−7	4 strokes	(South Korea) Amy Yang	585,000
7	18 Nov 2012	CME Group Titleholders	67-68-69-70=274	−14	2 strokes	(South Korea) Ryu So-yeon	500,000
8	31 Jan 2015	Coates Golf Championship	68-70-66-68=272	−16	1 stroke	(South Korea) Jang Ha-na (New Zealand) Lydia Ko (United States) Jessica Korda	225,000
9	28 Jun 2015	Walmart NW Arkansas Championship	66-63-69=198	−15	2 strokes	(Japan) Mika Miyazato	300,000

LPGA Tour playoff record (1–3)

No.	Year	Tournament	Opponent(s)	Result
1	2008	Evian Masters	(Sweden) Helen Alfredsson (United States) (Brazil) Angela Park	Alfredsson won with birdie on third extra hole Park eliminated by birdie on first hole.
2	2010	Jamie Farr Owens Corning Classic	(United States) Christina Kim (South Korea) In-Kyung Kim (South Korea) Song-Hee Kim	Won with birdie on second extra hole.
3	2011	Safeway Classic	(Norway) Suzann Pettersen	Lost to par on first extra hole.
4	2012	HSBC Women's Champions	(China) Shanshan Feng (South Korea) Jenny Shin (United States) Angela Stanford	Stanford won with par on third extra hole. Choi eliminated by par on second hole. Feng eliminated by par on first hole.

=== LPGA of Korea Tour wins (8) ===
No.	Date	Tournament	Winning score	To par	Margin of victory	Runner(s)-up
1	6 Nov 2004	ADT CAPS Invitational (as an amateur)	68-66-68=202	−14	4 strokes	(South Korea) Pak Se-ri (South Korea) Han Ji-yeon (South Korea) Kim So-hee
2	3 Jun 2005	Lakeside Ladies Open	71-69-71=211	−5	1 stroke	(South Korea) Lim Seo-hyun (South Korea) Shin Eun-jeong (South Korea) Kim Seon-a
3	30 Sep 2006	KB Star Tour 3rd Tournament in Hampyeong	68-67-69=204	−12	3 strokes	(South Korea) Jiyai Shin
4	21 Sep 2007	Shinsegae Cup KLPGA Championship	68-69-68=205	−11	3 strokes	(South Korea) Ji Eun-hee
5	1 Nov 2009	Hana Bank-KOLON Championship (co-sanctioned with LPGA)	67-68-71=206	−10	1 stroke	(Taiwan) Yani Tseng (Sweden) Maria Hjorth
6	31 Oct 2010	LPGA Hana Bank Championship (co-sanctioned with LPGA)	69-69-68=206	−10	2 strokes	(United States) Vicky Hurst
7	4 Sep 2011	Hanwha Finance Classic	72-75-71-69=287	−1	4 strokes	(South Korea) Choi Hye-yong
8	9 Dec 2012	Swinging Skirts World Ladies Masters	73-68-72=213	−3	Playoff	(Taiwan) Teresa Lu

== Major championships ==
=== Wins (1) ===
Year	Championship	Winning score	Margin	Runner-up
2012	U.S. Women's Open	−7 (71-72-65-73=281)	4 strokes	(South Korea) Amy Yang

=== Results timeline ===
Results not in chronological order before 2019.

Tournament	2007	2008	2009	2010	2011	2012	2013	2014	2015	2016	2017	2018	2019	2020	2021	2022
Chevron Championship		T6	T40	T27	T47	T8	T32	T16	T29	T18	CUT	CUT				
U.S. Women's Open	CUT	T19	T9	T2	CUT	1	T17	T13	T26	CUT	T60		CUT		T54	CUT
Women's PGA Championship		T18	8	CUT	T43	DQ	T9	T25	T34	CUT	CUT		T71		CUT	
The Evian Championship ^							T44	5		WD				NT		
Women's British Open		T21	T8	T3	T7	T13	T2	CUT	T61	CUT						

^ The Evian Championship was added as a major in 2013.

Win
Top 10
Did not play

CUT = missed the half-way cut
DQ = disqualified
NT = no tournament
T = tied

=== Summary ===
Tournament	Wins	2nd	3rd	Top-5	Top-10	Top-25	Events	Cuts made
Chevron Championship	0	0	0	0	2	4	11	9
U.S. Women's Open	1	1	0	2	3	6	14	9
Women's PGA Championship	0	0	0	0	2	4	12	7
The Evian Championship	0	0	0	1	1	1	3	2
Women's British Open	0	1	1	2	4	6	9	7
Totals	1	2	1	5	12	21	49	34

- Most consecutive cuts made – 9 (twice)
- Longest streak of top-10s – 3 (2009 LPGA – 2009 British Open)

== LPGA Tour career summary ==
Year	Tournaments played	Cuts made	Wins	2nds	3rds	Top 10s	Best finish	Earnings ($)	Money list rank	Scoring average	Scoring rank
2005	2	1	0	0	0	0	T14	18,136	n/a	73.80	n/a
2006	2	2	0	0	0	0	T11	29,113	n/a	72.17	n/a
2007	3	1	0	0	0	1	T8	27,899	n/a	75.00	n/a
2008	27	27	0	2	1	9	T2	1,095,759	11	71.10	8
2009	26	26	2	0	3	11	1	1,341,078	6	70.51	7
2010	23	22	2	4	2	15	1	1,871,166	1	69.87	1
2011	21	20	1	2	3	12	1	1,357,382	3	70.53	2
2012	22	22	2	3	1	10	1	1,981,834	2	70.49	5
2013	24	24	0	2	0	8	2	929,964	9	70.31	5
2014	26	24	0	1	1	6	2	945,813	13	70.54	10
2015	22	20	2	0	0	3	1	808,566	17	71.76	48
2016	24	13	0	0	1	3	T3	348,390	55	72.55	93
2017	20	9	0	0	0	1	T7	46,311	135	72.81	142
2018	4	1	0	0	0	0	T62	2,988	177	74.40	n/a
2019	21	11	0	0	1	1	T3	132,699	95	72.15	109
2020	6	2	0	0	0	0	T43	7,263	160	72.69	n/a
2021	16	8	0	0	0	0	T17	68,025	126	72.44	121
2022	17	6	0	0	0	0	T18	51,427	146	72.95	145

- official through 2022 season

== Team appearances ==
Professional

- Lexus Cup (representing Asia team): 2008
- International Crown (representing South Korea): 2014
