= Amy Yang =

South Korean professional golfer (born 1989)

Amy Yang 양희영
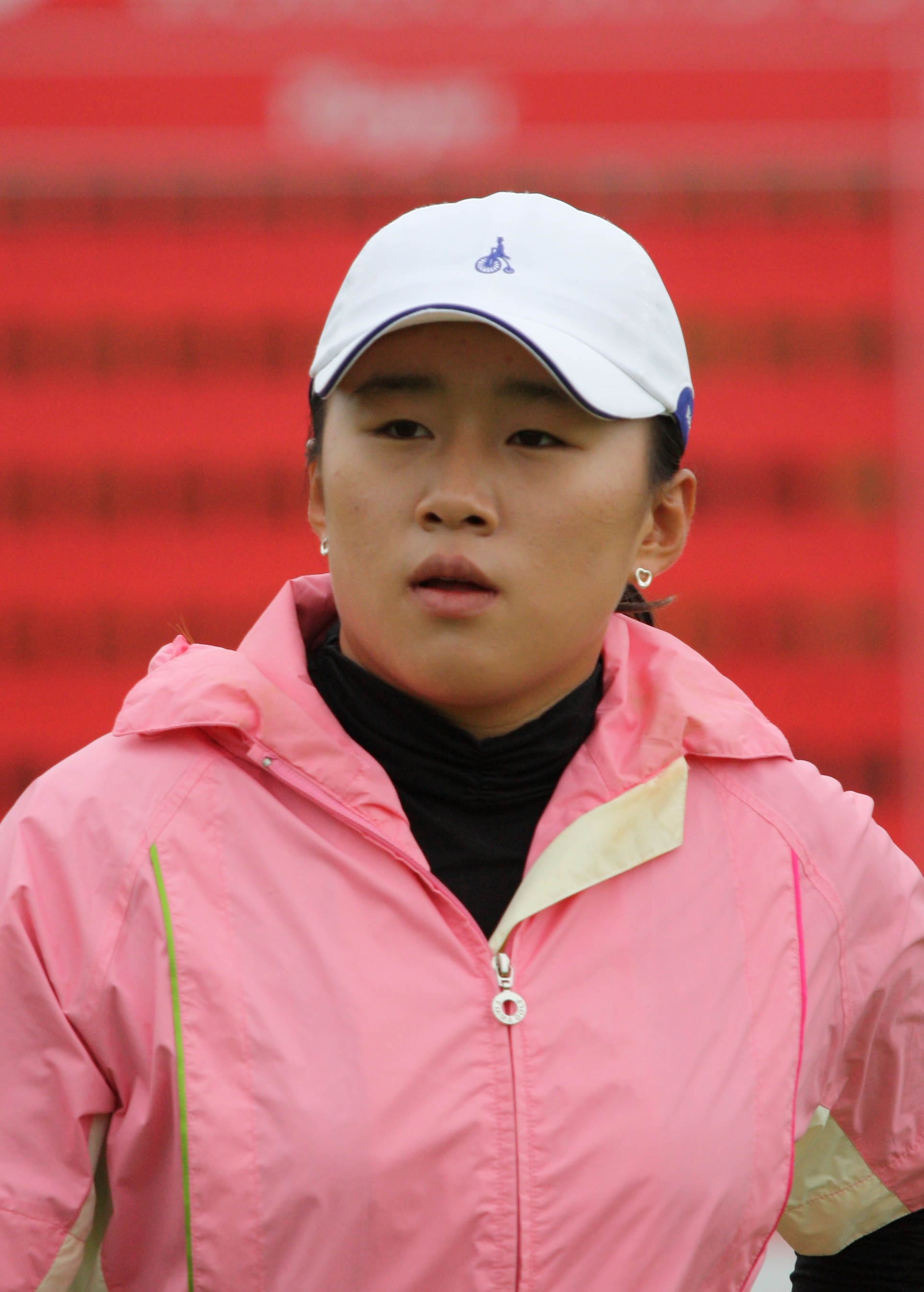
- Yang at the 2009 Women's British Open

Personal information
- Full name: Yang Hee-Young
- Nationality: South Korea
- Born: 28 July 1989 (age 37) Ilsan, Goyang, Gyeonggi-do, South Korea
- Height: 5 ft 8 in (173 cm)

Career
- Sport: Golf
- Turned professional: 2006
- Current tours: LPGA Tour (joined 2008); Ladies European Tour (LET) (joined 2006)
- Professional wins: 9

Number of wins by tour
- LPGA Tour: 6
- Ladies European Tour: 3
- LPGA of Korea Tour: 2

Best results in LPGA major championships (wins: 1)
- Chevron Championship: T4: 2012, 2023
- Women's PGA C'ship: Won: 2024
- U.S. Women's Open: 2nd: 2012, 2015
- Women's British Open: 4th/T4: 2011, 2023
- Evian Championship: T8: 2015

Achievements and awards
- Race to the CME Globe: 2023

Amy Yang, also known as Yang Hee-Young (Korean: 양희영, born 28 July 1989) is a South Korean professional golfer, currently playing on the United States–based LPGA Tour and on the Ladies European Tour (LET).

== Early life and amateur career ==
At the age of 10, Yang began playing golf in South Korea. She moved to the Gold Coast of Australia with her family at age 15 to pursue golf more seriously.

In 2005, she won the Queensland Amateur Championship, the youngest winner ever of that championship. In 2006, while still an amateur she won the ANZ Ladies Masters on the Ladies European Tour (LET), making her the youngest winner ever on the LET at age 16 years, 192 days (a record later broken by 14-year-old amateur Atthaya Thitikul in July 2017).

== Professional career ==
After her win in at the ANZ Ladies Masters, the LET offered Yang a special three-year membership exemption beginning in 2006 as a 17-year-old, providing she traveled with her parents until she turned 18. She recorded four top-20 finishes in 2007 while still attended high school.

Yang attended LPGA Tour qualifying school in the fall of 2007 and obtained conditional status on the LPGA Tour as well for 2008.

In June 2008, Yang claimed her second LET win with a four-shot win at the Ladies German Open. Upon winning, Yang announced that she was donating her entire prize of $61,260 to victims of a recent earthquake in China.

That December, she returned to the LPGA Qualifying School, this time earning full playing status for 2009 by finishing second in the five-round event.

On 20 October 2013, Yang won her first LPGA Tour event at the LPGA KEB-HanaBank Championship. She birdied the first sudden-death playoff hole to defeat Hee-Kyung Seo.

On 1 March 2015, Yang won her second LPGA tournament at the Honda LPGA Thailand, a title she won for a second and third time in 2017 and 2019 respectively.

On 24 June 2024, Yang won her first major title at the Women's PGA Championship in her 75th major start.

== Personal life ==
In the fall of 2007, her family moved from Australia to Orlando, Florida.

== Professional wins (10) ==
=== LPGA Tour wins (6) ===
Legend
Major championships (1)
Other LPGA Tour (5)

No.	Date	Tournament	Winning score	To par	Margin of victory	Runner(s)-up	Winner's share ($)
1	20 Oct 2013	LPGA KEB-HanaBank Championship	67-71-69=207	−9	Playoff	(South Korea) Hee-kyung Seo	285,000
2	1 Mar 2015	Honda LPGA Thailand	67-66-71-69=273	−15	2 strokes	(South Korea) Mirim Lee (United States) Stacy Lewis (Taiwan) Yani Tseng	225,000
3	26 Feb 2017	Honda LPGA Thailand (2)	66-67-65-68=266	−22	5 strokes	(South Korea) Ryu So-yeon	240,000
4	24 Feb 2019	Honda LPGA Thailand (3)	69-66-66-65=266	−22	1 stroke	(Australia) Minjee Lee	240,000
5	19 Nov 2023	CME Group Tour Championship	68-63-64-66=261	−27	3 strokes	(Japan) Nasa Hataoka (United States) Alison Lee	2,000,000
6	23 Jun 2024	KPMG Women's PGA Championship	70-68-71-72=281	−7	3 strokes	(South Korea) Ko Jin-young (United States) Lilia Vu (Japan) Miyū Yamashita	1,560,000

LPGA Tour playoff record (1–1)

No.	Year	Tournament	Opponent	Result
1	2011	Walmart NW Arkansas Championship	(Taiwan) Yani Tseng	Lost to birdie on first extra hole
2	2013	LPGA KEB-HanaBank Championship	(South Korea) Hee-Kyung Seo	Won with birdie on first extra hole

=== Ladies European Tour (3) ===
- 2006 (1) ANZ Ladies Masters (as an amateur)
- 2008 (2) Ladies German Open, Scandinavian TPC hosted by Annika

=== KLPGA Tour (2) ===
- 2011 (1) KB Star Championship
- 2013 (1) LPGA KEB-HanaBank Championship (co-sanctioned by LPGA Tour)

== Major championships ==
=== Wins (1) ===
Year	Championship	54 holes	Winning score	Margin	Runner-up
2024	Women's PGA Championship	2 shot lead	−7 (70-68-71-72=281)	3 strokes	(South Korea) Ko Jin-young (United States) Lilia Vu (Japan) Miyū Yamashita

=== Results timeline ===
Results not in chronological order.

Tournament	2006	2007	2008	2009	2010	2011	2012	2013	2014	2015	2016	2017	2018	2019	2020	2021	2022	2023	2024	2025	2026
Chevron Championship					T27	T19	T4	T32	10	T29	T14	T8	CUT	T26	T15	T50	T39	T4	T46	T52	T59
U.S. Women's Open		T50	CUT	T34	T5	T10	2	T50	4	2	T3	T8	CUT	CUT	CUT	T54	CUT	T33	CUT	T36	T40
Women's PGA Championship				T9	T14	T12	CUT	T5	CUT	T26	7	T4	T11	T21	T37	T9	CUT	T36	1	CUT	T19
The Evian Championship ^								T67	T54	T8	T14	T48	T49	T44	NT	T10	T19	T36	T63	T56	15
Women's British Open	T60LA		CUT	CUT	T5	4	T26	CUT	T21	T36		T30	T35	CUT	T51	CUT	CUT	T4	T37	T50	T47

^ The Evian Championship was added as a major in 2013.

Win
Top 10
Did not play

LA = low amateur
CUT = missed the half-way cut
NT = no tournament
"T" = tied

=== Summary ===
Tournament	Wins	2nd	3rd	Top-5	Top-10	Top-25	Events	Cuts made
Chevron Championship	0	0	0	2	4	7	17	16
U.S. Women's Open	0	2	1	5	7	7	20	14
Women's PGA Championship	1	0	0	3	6	11	18	15
The Evian Championship	0	0	0	0	2	5	13	13
Women's British Open	0	0	0	3	3	4	19	13
Totals	1	2	1	13	22	34	87	70

- Most consecutive cuts made – 15 (2014 Evian – 2017 Evian)
- Longest streak of top-10s – 3 (twice)

== LPGA Tour career summary ==
Year	Events Played	Cuts Made	Wins	2nds	3rds	Top 10s	Best finish	Earnings ($)	Money list rank	Scoring Average	Rank
2006	2	2	0	0	0	0	T52	n/a	n/a	74.38	n/a
2007	2	2	0	0	0	0	T50	17,100	n/a	74.38	n/a
2008	7	5	0	0	0	1	T9	60,834	129	72.46	n/a
2009	23	19	0	0	1	2	T3	302,816	45	71.68	29
2010	22	22	0	1	0	6	2	765,929	14	71.09	13
2011	22	20	0	2	0	7	2	912,160	10	71.12	10
2012	22	20	0	1	0	5	2	844,305	13	71.04	12
2013	22	19	1	0	0	6	1	719,481	18	70.76	13
2014	21	18	0	1	0	5	T2	618,180	25	71.60	37
2015	23	21	1	2	0	10	1	1,438,312	6	70.51	10
2016	22	22	0	2	4	9	T2	1,152,686	13	70.09	7
2017	23	22	1	1	0	6	1	991,855	18	70.35	20
2018	23	19	0	0	3	8	3	809,492	24	70.24	13
2019	23	21	1	0	2	6	1	941,956	17	70.02	12
2020	13	10	0	0	0	0	T12	171,438	66	71.93	63
2021	22	16	0	0	1	6	T3	548,544	37	70.73	34
2022	20	14	0	0	0	3	T4	439,097	58	70.42	24
2023	20	16	1	0	1	5	1	3,165,834	2	70.49	24
2024	22	15	1	0	0	2	1	1,965,409	12	71.31	56
2025	19	14	0	0	0	0	T11	269,263	90	71.84	96
Totals^	369 (2008)	313 (2008)	6	10	12	87	1	16,117,591	8		

Official as of 2025 season
* Includes matchplay and other tournaments without a cut.

== World ranking ==
Position in Women's World Golf Rankings at the end of each calendar year.

Year	World ranking	Source
2013	15	
2014	23	
2015	8	
2016	12	
2017	15	
2018	25	
2019	20	
2020	44	
2021	60	
2022	82	
2023	16	
2024	12	
2025	79	

== Team appearances ==
Professional

- International Crown (representing South Korea): 2016
