= Brittany Lang =

American professional golfer (born 1985)

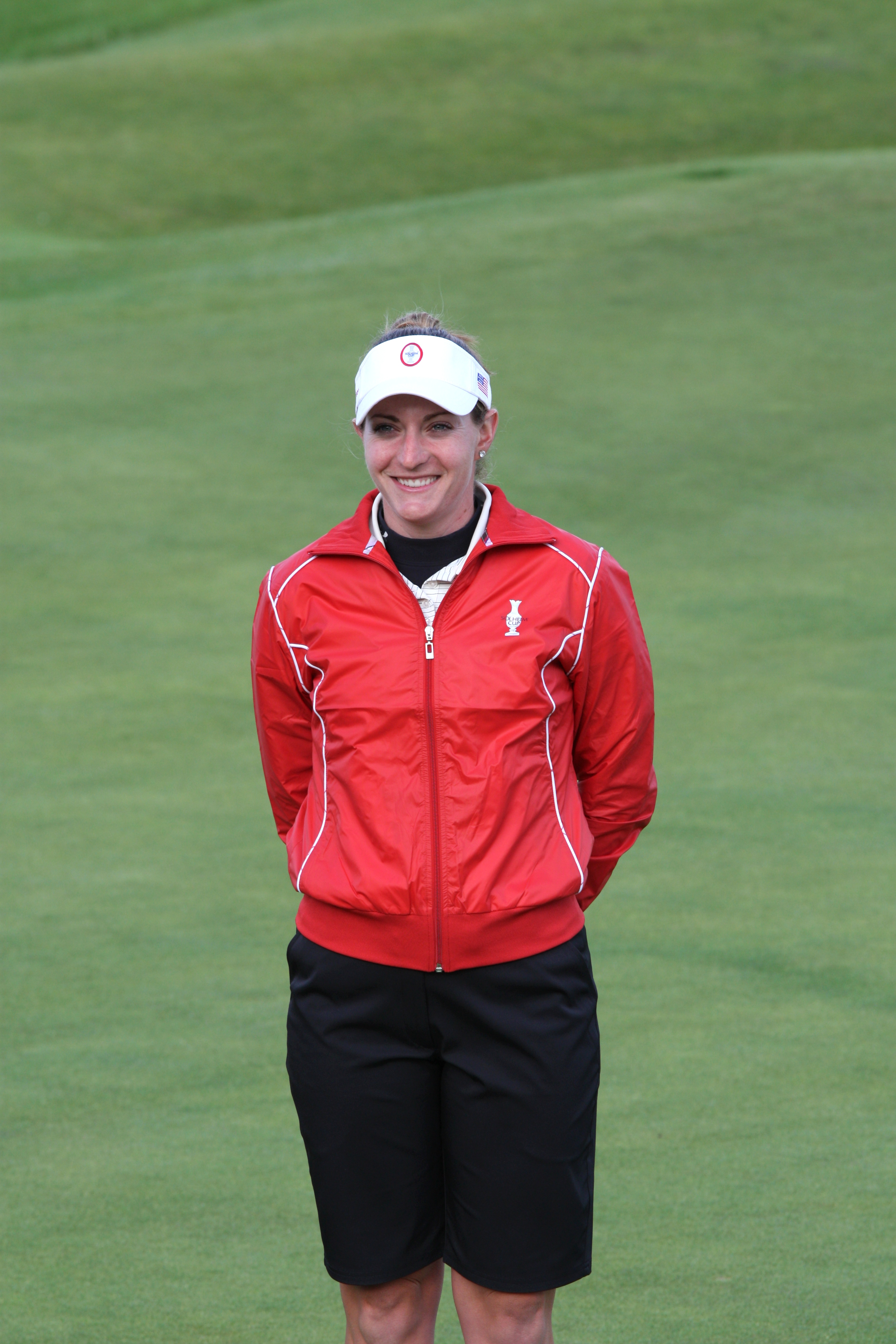
- Lang in 2009

Personal information
- Nationality: United States
- Born: August 22, 1985 (age 41) Richmond, Virginia, U.S.
- Height: 5 ft 8 in (1.73 m)

Career
- Sport: Golf
- College: Duke University
- Turned professional: 2005
- Current tour: LPGA Tour (joined 2006)
- Professional wins: 2

Number of wins by tour
- LPGA Tour: 2

Best results in LPGA major championships (wins: 1)
- Chevron Championship: T8: 2006
- Women's PGA C'ship: T18: 2008
- U.S. Women's Open: Won: 2016
- Women's British Open: 2nd: 2011
- Evian Championship: T12: 2021

Brittany Lang (born August 22, 1985) is an American professional golfer. She plays on the LPGA Tour. Lang has won one major championship, the 2016 U.S. Women's Open.

== Early life ==
In 1985, Lang was born in Richmond, Virginia. She was raised in McKinney, Texas.

Lang had a decorated junior career. She won eight American Junior Golf Association (AJGA) events and was a two-time First-Team Polo Golf Junior All-American, in 2001 and 2002. Lang represented the United States at the PING Junior Solheim Cup in 2002. In 2003, Lang graduated from McKinney High School.

== Amateur career ==
In 2003, Lang entered Duke University. She attended for two years and won six collegiate tournaments. In the summer, she won the North and South Women's Amateur and the Women's Western Amateur in consecutive weeks. She was also named the 2004 Atlantic Coast Conference Freshman of the Year and NCAA Freshman College Golfer of the Year. She also won the 2004 Trans National Amateur title. In 2005, Lang was the ACC Player of the Year. She also won back-to-back ACC individual titles in 2004 and 2005.

Lang was also a member of the victorious Curtis Cup team in 2004 and won medalist honors at the U.S. Women's Amateur Public Links, where she advanced to the quarterfinals of match play.

While still an amateur in 2005, Lang competed as a sponsor's exemption in both the Kraft Nabisco Championship and the LPGA Corning Classic, where she tied for 15th. She finished her amateur career at the U.S. Women's Open at Cherry Hills, where she tied for second with fellow low amateur Morgan Pressel, two strokes behind champion Birdie Kim. With the last hole to play, Lang was in the clubhouse when Kim holed out from the 18th greenside bunker to seal the victory.

== Professional career ==
In 2005, after two years of college golf at Duke, Lang turned professional. It was shortly after her runner-up finish at the U.S. Women's Open. She received sponsor's exemptions in 2005 to the Jamie Farr Owens Corning Classic (T-36), State Farm Classic, and Canadian Women's Open (T-6). Lang was the medalist in the first stage of the LPGA Qualifying Tournament in September, then finished T-22 at the final stage in December to earn full playing privileges for the 2006 season.

Lang recorded six top-ten finishes, in 2006 and 2008. At the end of 2008, her third season on the LPGA Tour, her career earnings exceeded $1 million.

Lang's first professional win came in June 2012 at the inaugural Manulife Financial LPGA Classic in Canada, where she triumphed in a four-player playoff. She birdied the last hole four consecutive times to win the playoff. It was the first-ever victory in an LPGA event by a former Duke Blue Devil, and Lang's 154th event on tour.

Lang has seven top ten finishes in major championships: six as a professional and one as an amateur. She won the U.S. Women's Open in 2016 at CordeValle and was a solo runner-up at the Women's British Open in 2011 at Carnoustie.

She has represented the United States in four successive Solheim Cups in 2009, 2011, 2013, and 2015. She was undefeated in singles play until falling to Melissa Reid in 2015.

== Awards and honors ==
- In 2004, while at Duke University, Lang earned NCAA Freshman College Golfer of the Year.
- In 2005, Lang was the ACC Player of the Year.

== Professional wins (2) ==
=== LPGA Tour wins (2) ===
Legend
Major championships (1)
Other LPGA Tour (1)

No.	Date	Tournament	Winning score	To par	Margin of victory	Runner(s)-up	Winner's share ($)
1	Jun 24, 2012	Manulife Financial LPGA Classic	69-65-67-67=268	–16	Playoff	(South Korea) Chella Choi (South Korea) Inbee Park (South Korea) Hee Kyung Seo	195,000
2	Jul 10, 2016	U.S. Women's Open	68-75-68-71=282	–6	Playoff	(Sweden) Anna Nordqvist	810,000

LPGA Tour playoff record (2–0)

No.	Year	Tournament	Opponent(s)	Result
1	2012	Manulife Financial LPGA Classic	(South Korea) Chella Choi (South Korea) Inbee Park (South Korea) Hee Kyung Seo	Lang won with birdie on third extra hole Park eliminated by birdie on second hole Choi eliminated by birdie on first hole
2	2016	U.S. Women's Open	(Sweden) Anna Nordqvist	Won three hole aggregate playoff: Lang: 3-4-5=12 (E), Nordqvist: 3-6-6=15 (+3)

== Major championships ==
=== Wins (1) ===
Year	Championship	54 holes	Winning score	Margin	Runner-up
2016	U.S. Women's Open	2 shot deficit	−6 (68-75-68-71=282)	Playoff^{1}	(Sweden) Anna Nordqvist

^{1} Defeated Nordqvist in a three-hole aggregate playoff: Lang (3-4-5=12) and Nordqvist (3-6-6=15)

=== Results timeline ===
Results not in chronological order.

Tournament	2005	2006	2007	2008	2009	2010	2011	2012
Chevron Championship	CUT	T8	T15	T21	T17	T10	T57	T26
Women's PGA Championship			T69	T18	T39	T42	CUT	T62
U.S. Women's Open	T2TLA	CUT	CUT	T31	T40	T5	T50	T21
Women's British Open		CUT	CUT	CUT	T33	T43	2	CUT

!Tournament	2013	2014	2015	2016	2017	2018	2019	2020
Chevron Championship	CUT	CUT	T35	CUT	T42	CUT	CUT	T51
Women's PGA Championship	T72	T62	T49	T39	CUT	CUT	T21	CUT
U.S. Women's Open	T7	T22	T14	1	T58	CUT	T68	CUT
The Evian Championship^	T57	CUT	CUT	CUT	CUT	T54	T55	NT
Women's British Open	CUT	T43	CUT	T60	CUT	CUT	T61	CUT

Tournament	2021	2022	2023	2024	2025	2026
Chevron Championship	CUT					
U.S. Women's Open	CUT	CUT	T59	CUT		CUT
Women's PGA Championship	T40	CUT				
The Evian Championship	T12					
Women's British Open						

^ The Evian Championship was added as a major in 2013

Win
Top 10
Did not play

LA = low amateur
CUT = missed the half-way cut
NT = no tournament
T = tied

=== Summary ===
Tournament	Wins	2nd	3rd	Top-5	Top-10	Top-25	Events	Cuts made
Chevron Championship	0	0	0	0	2	5	17	10
U.S. Women's Open	1	1	0	3	4	7	21	13
Women's PGA Championship	0	0	0	0	0	2	16	11
The Evian Championship	0	0	0	0	0	1	8	4
Women's British Open	0	1	0	1	1	1	15	6
Totals	1	2	0	4	7	16	77	44

- Most consecutive cuts made – 9 (2009 Kraft Nabisco – 2011 Kraft Nabisco)
- Longest streak of top-10s – 2 (2005 U.S. Open – 2006 Kraft Nabisco)

== LPGA Tour career summary ==
Year	Tournaments played	Cuts made*	Wins	2nd	3rd	Top 10s	Best finish	Earnings ($)	Money list rank	Scoring average	Scoring rank
2005	6	4	0	1	0	2	T2	500	n/a	71.90	n/a
2006	27	21	0	0	2	7	T3	538,552	21	71.35	16
2007	26	15	0	0	0	2	T4	348,148	39	73.05	60
2008	28	23	0	2	0	8	T2	630,294	30	71.79	29
2009	26	25	0	2	0	7	T2	675,065	19	71.08	15
2010	22	16	0	0	0	2	T5	297,213	35	72.32	44
2011	22	20	0	1	0	7	2	627,691	16	72.00	27
2012	25	24	1	0	0	3	1	575,263	24	71.59	26
2013	28	22	0	0	0	1	T7	355,809	42	71.97	46
2014	30	26	0	0	1	5	T3	551,703	29	71.35	24
2015	29	21	0	1	0	5	2	616,097	25	71.44	33
2016	28	23	1	0	0	6	1	1,259,787	9	71.11	30
2017	25	20	0	0	0	1	T10	248,934	69	71.76	76
2018	22	7	0	0	0	0	T25	58,989	127	72.47	115
2019	22	13	0	0	0	0	T16	154,858	87	71.96	93
2020	14	8	0	0	0	1	T6	117,129	80	72.31	82
2021	18	6	0	0	0	1	10	133,887	98	73.02	133
2022	15	7	0	0	0	1	T9	83,418	123	71.92	100
2023	4	2	0	0	0	0	T59	26,910	172	73.83	n/a
2024	5	2	0	0	0	1	T8	40,628	168	0.00	n/a

Official as of 2024 season
* Includes matchplay and other events without a cut.

== World ranking ==
Position in Women's World Golf Rankings at the end of each calendar year.

Year	Ranking	Notes
2006	28	
2007	53	
2008	46	
2009	26	
2010	48	
2011	32	
2012	29	
2013	62	
2014	66	
2015	44	
2016	22	
2017	65	
2018	249	
2019	200	
2020	159	
2021	200	
2022	303	
2023	576	
2024	956	

== Team appearances ==
Amateur

- Junior Solheim Cup (representing the United States): 2002 (winners)
- Curtis Cup (representing the United States): 2004 (winners)

Professional

- Solheim Cup (representing the United States): 2009 (winners), 2011, 2013, 2015 (winners), 2017 (winners)

=== Solheim Cup record ===
Year	Total matches	Total W–L–H	Singles W–L–H	Foursomes W–L–H	Fourballs W–L–H	Points won	Points %
Career	17	7–7–3	2–2–1	1–3–0	4–2–2	8.5	50.0
2009	3	1–0–2	0–0–1 halved w/ L. Davies		1–0–1 won w/ B. Lincicome 5&4 halved w/ A. Stanford	2	66.7
2011	4	1–3–0	1–0–0 def. S. Gal 6&5	0–2–0 lost w/ J. Inkster 1 dn lost w/ J. Inkster 3&2	0–1–0 lost w/ M. Wie 4&3	1	25.0
2013	4	3–1–0	1–0–0 def. A. Muñoz 2&1	1–1–0 lost w/ A. Stanford 2&1 won w/ M. Wie 2&1	1–0–0 won w/ B. Lincicome 4&3	3	75.0
2015	3	0–2–1	0–1–0 lost to M. Reid 2&1		0–1–1 halved w/ G. Piller lost w/ L. Salas 2&1	0.5	16.7
2017	3	2–1–0	0–1–0 lost to C. Hull 1 dn		2–0–0 won w/ B. Lincicome 3&2 won w/ B. Lincicome 2 up	2	66.7
