= 2011 U.S. Women's Open =

Coordinates: 38.788°N 104.851°W

Tournament information
- Dates: July 7–11, 2011
- Location: Colorado Springs, Colorado
- Courses: The Broadmoor, East Course
- Organized by: USGA
- Tour: LPGA Tour

Statistics
- Par: 71
- Length: 7,047 yards (6,444 m)
- Field: 156 players, 72 after cut
- Cut: 149 (+7)
- Prize fund: $3.25 million
- Winner's share: $585,000

Champion
- (South Korea) So Yeon Ryu
- 281 (−3), playoff

Location in the United States
Location in Colorado

The 2011 U.S. Women's Open was the 66th U.S. Women's Open, played July 7–11 at The Broadmoor East Course in Colorado Springs, Colorado. It was one of 13 national championships conducted by the United States Golf Association (USGA). The course is at an elevation of over 6,200 feet (1,890 m) above sea level and previously hosted the U.S. Women's Open in 1995, the first major championship won by Annika Sörenstam. Broadmoor East was the first course in the history of the tournament to play longer than 7,000 yards (6,400 m)

Because of repeated weather delays during each of the tournament days, each round spanned multiple days and play was concluded on Monday, July 11.

The champion was So Yeon Ryu of South Korea, who defeated compatriot Hee Kyung Seo in a three-hole aggregate playoff. Both players finished the regulation 72 holes at 281 (−3), two strokes ahead of Cristie Kerr. Seo completed her final round on Sunday and Ryu on Monday morning. Ryu won the playoff by three strokes, with birdies on the last two holes.

This was the first U.S. Women's Open to use the three-hole aggregate playoff. The playoff was formerly 18 holes, last played in 2006; the format was changed for 2007. The tournament was televised by ESPN and NBC Sports.

== Qualifying and field ==
The championship was open to any female professional or amateur golfer with a USGA handicap index not exceeding 4.4. Players qualified by competing in one of twenty 36-hole qualifying tournaments that took place between May 16 and June 5 at sites across the United States. Additional players were exempt from qualifying because of past performances in professional or amateur tournaments around the world.

=== Exempt from qualifying ===
Many players were exempt in multiple categories. Players are listed only once, in the first category in which they became exempt, with additional categories in parentheses ( ) next to their names. Golfers qualifying in Category 10 who qualify by more than one method are also denoted with the tour by which they qualified.

1. Winners of the U.S. Women's Open for the last ten years (2001–2010)
Juli Inkster (7), Paula Creamer (6,7,9) Eun-Hee Ji (7), Cristie Kerr (3,7,9), Birdie Kim, Inbee Park (6,7,10-JLPGA), Karrie Webb (5,7,8,9)
Exempt but did not enter tournament: Hilary Lunke, Meg Mallon, Annika Sörenstam

2. Winner and runner-up from the 2010 U.S. Women's Amateur Championship (must be an amateur)
Danielle Kang (The runner-up, Jessica Korda, turned professional in December 2010 and lost her exemption in this category. She qualified at May 16 sectional qualifying in Osprey, Florida.)

3. Winners of the LPGA Championship for the last five years (2007–2011)
Anna Nordqvist (7), Suzann Pettersen (6,7,9), Yani Tseng (4,5,6,7,8,9)

4. Winners of the Ricoh Women's British Open for the last five years (2006–2010)
Catriona Matthew (7), Jiyai Shin (6,7,8,9), Sherri Steinhauer (7)
Exempt but did not enter tournament: Lorena Ochoa (7)

5. Winners of the Kraft Nabisco Championship for the last five years (2007–2011)
Stacy Lewis (7,8,9), Brittany Lincicome (7,9), Morgan Pressel (7,8)

6. 10 lowest scorers and anyone tying for 10th place from the 2010 U.S. Women's Open Championship
Na Yeon Choi (7,8,9) I.K. Kim (7,8,9,10–LET), Brittany Lang (7), Amy Yang (7), Christina Kim (7), Lexi Thompson, Sakura Yokomine (10-JLPGA)

7. Top 70 money leaders from the 2010 final official LPGA money list
Shi Hyun Ahn, Kyeong Bae, Amanda Blumenherst, Laura Diaz, Shanshan Feng, Meaghan Francella, Katie Futcher, Sandra Gal (8,9), Natalie Gulbis, Sophie Gustafson, Hee-Won Han, Maria Hjorth (8,9), Katherine Hull (9), Amy Hung, M.J. Hur, Pat Hurst, Vicky Hurst, Haeji Kang, Jeong Jang, Jimin Kang (9), Song-Hee Kim, Candie Kung, Jee Young Lee, Meena Lee, Seon Hwa Lee, Teresa Lu, Kristy McPherson, Na On Min, Azahara Muñoz, Ai Miyazato (9), Mika Miyazato, Gwladys Nocera, Se Ri Pak, Hee Young Park, Stacy Prammanasudh, Beatriz Recari (9), Michele Redman, Alena Sharp, Sarah Jane Smith, Angela Stanford, Karen Stupples, Momoko Ueda, Mariajo Uribe, Wendy Ward, Michelle Wie (8,9), Lindsey Wright, Sun Young Yoo, Heather Bowie Young
Exempt but did not enter tournament: Karine Icher

8. Top 10 money leaders from the 2011 official LPGA money list, through the close of entries on May 4 (must have filed an entry by May 4)
All players in this category already qualified in at least one other category

9. Winners of LPGA co-sponsored events, whose victories are considered official, from the conclusion of the 2010 U.S. Women's Open Championship to the initiation of the 2011 U.S. Women's Open Championship
All players in this category already qualified in at least one other category

10. Top five money leaders from the 2010 Japan LPGA Tour, Korea LPGA Tour and Ladies European Tour
Japan LPGA Tour: Sun-Ju Ahn, Jeon Mi-jeong, Yukari Baba
Korea LPGA Tour: Bo Mee Lee, Soo Jin Yang, Shin Ae Ahn, So Yeon Ryu, Hye Youn Kim
Ladies European Tour: Lee-Anne Pace, Laura Davies, Melissa Reid
Exempt but did not enter tournament: Iben Tinning (LET)

11. Special exemptions selected by the USGA
none

=== Qualifiers ===
The following players qualified for the 2011 U.S. Women's Open through one of the sectional qualifying tournaments. At sites with multiple qualifiers, players are listed in order of qualifying scores, from lowest score to highest.

May 16 at Oak Valley Golf Club, Beaumont, California
Ariya Jutanugarn, Gabriella Then, Moriya Jutanugarn

May 16 at The Oaks Club, Osprey, Florida
Jessica Korda, Victoria Tanco, Doris Chen, Jane Park

May 16 at Druid Hills Golf Club, Atlanta, Georgia
Reilley Rankin, Whitney Wade, Mariah Stackhouse

May 16 at Paradise Pointe Club (The Outlaw and The Posse Courses), Kansas City, Missouri
Yoo Kyeong Kim

May 17 at Carolina Trace Country Club (Lake Course), Sanford, North Carolina)
Jean Chua, Lauren Doughtie

May 17 at Indiana Country Club, Indiana, Pennsylvania
Whitney Neuhauser, Jennifer Johnson

May 22 at Poipu Bay Golf Club, Koloa, Hawaii
Mariel Galdiano

May 23 at Lake Merced Golf Club, Daly City, California
Ryann O'Toole, Mina Harigae, Sofie Andersson, Shinobu Moromizato

May 23 at Deerwood Country Club, Jacksonwille, Florida
Mi Hyun Kim, Aree Song, Silvia Cavalleri, Lindy Duncan, Christine Wolf, Nicole Hage, Paola Morena

May 23 at Westmoreland Country Club, Wilmette, Illinois
Junthima Gulyanamitta, Brittany Johnson, Ashley Prange, Karin Sjödin

May 23 at Woodmont Country Club, Rockville, Maryland
Leta Lindley, Julieta Granada, Cindy Lacrosse, Young-A Yang, Chella Choi, Saehee Son, Danah Bordner, Joanna Coe

May 23 at Medina Golf and Country Club, Medina, Minnesota
Amy Anderson, Kelly Shon

May 23 at Fiddler's Elbow Country Club, Bedminster, New Jersey
Hee Kyung Seo, Belén Mozo, Jin Young Pak

May 23 at Royal Oakes Country Club, Vancouver, Washington
Jessi Gebhardt, Christina Proteau, Sue Kim

May 25 at Crestview Country Club, Agawam, Massachusetts
Alison Walshe, Dewi Claire Schreefel, Anna Grzebien, Jennifer Kirby, Harukyo Nomura, Brittany Marchand, Jaclyn Sweeney

May 31 at Industry Hills Golf Club (Eisenhower Course), City of Industry, California
Jennifer Rosales, Stephanie Kono, Erynne Lee, Lizette Salas

May 31 at Pine Forest Country Club, Houston, Texas
Katy Harris, Lisa McCloskey, Becky Morgan

May 31 at Prestonwood Country Club (Hills Course), Plano, Texas
Sarah Kemp, Emily Collins, Chelsea Mocio

June 2 at Alta Mesa Golf Club, Mesa, Arizona
Kyung Kim, Betsy King, Margarita Ramos

June 5 at Broadmoor Golf Club (East Course), Colorado Springs, Colorado
Anya Alvarez, Garrett Phillips, Mallory Blackwelder

Alternates
Rachel Rohanna, Xi Yu Lin, and Jennifer Song – the first alternates from the Colorado Springs, Beaumont, CA, and the New Jersey qualifiers, respectively, were added to the field because all the winners of regular LPGA events from the close of entries on May 4 through the start of the U.S. Women's Open (Suzann Pettersen at the Sybase Match Play Championship, Brittany Lincicome at the ShopRite LPGA Classic, and Yani Tseng at the LPGA State Farm Classic), had already qualified for the 2011 U.S. Women's Open.

Emma Talley, the first alternate from the Wilmette, Illinois qualifier was added to the field on June 27 because the winner of the LPGA Championship, Yani Tseng, had already qualified for the Championship.

== Course layout ==
Hole	1	2	3	4	5	6	7	8	9	Out	10	11	12	13	14	15	16	17	18	In	Total
Yardage	420	339	560	142	426	402	426	166	535	3,416	460	440	223	450	413	432	180	600	443	3,631	7,047
Par	4	4	5	3	4	4	4	3	5	36	4	4	3	4	4	4	3	5	4	35	71

Lengths of the course for previous U.S. Women's Opens:

- 1995: 6,398 yards (5,850 m), par 70

== Round summaries ==
Weather delays interrupted play throughout the championship and each of the four rounds concluded the following day.

=== First round ===
Thursday, July 7, 2011
Friday, July 8, 2011

Place	Player	Score	To par
1	(United States) Stacy Lewis	68	−3
T2	(United States) Amy Anderson (a)	69	−2
T2	(United States) Lizette Salas	69	−2
T2	(United States) Ryann O'Toole	69	−2
T5	(United States) Lindy Duncan (a)	70	−1
T5	(Sweden) Maria Hjorth	70	−1
T5	(South Korea) In-Kyung Kim	70	−1
T5	(Japan) Mika Miyazato	70	−1
T5	(Japan) Ai Miyazato	70	−1
T5	(Australia) Karrie Webb	70	−1

=== Second round ===
Friday, July 8, 2011
Saturday, July 9, 2011

Place	Player	Score	To par
1	(Japan) Mika Miyazato	70-67=137	−5
2	(Japan) Ai Miyazato	70-68=138	−4
3	(South Korea) In-Kyung Kim	70-69=139	−3
T4	(United States) Stacy Lewis	68-73=141	−1
T4	(United States) Ryann O'Toole	69-72=141	−1
T6	(United States) Paula Creamer	72-70=142	E
T6	(South Korea) Eun-Hee Ji	73-69=142	E
T6	(United States) Lizette Salas	69-73=142	E
T6	(United States) Angela Stanford	72-70=142	E
T6	(United States) Wendy Ward	73-69=142	E

- Amateurs (a): M. Jutanugarn (+3), Anderson (+4), Tanco (+5), Duncan (+6), Kang (+7), Proteau (+8), Shon (+8), Kono (+10), Talley (+10), Lin (+11), Rohanna (+11), A. Jutanugarn (+12), Kirby (+12), Lee (+12), Kim (+13), Collins (+14), McCloskey (+14), Marchand (+14), Mocio (+17), Chen (+18), Wolf (+19), Stackhouse (+21), Ramos (+22), Then (+23), Galdano (+28).
- 72 players made the 36-hole cut at 149 (+7) or better (67 professionals, 5 amateurs).

=== Third round ===
Saturday, July 9, 2011
Sunday, July 10, 2011

Place	Player	Score	To par
T1	(United States) Cristie Kerr	71-72-69=212	−1
T1	(South Korea) So Yeon Ryu	74-69-69=212	−1
T1	(United States) Angela Stanford	72-70-70=212	−1
T4	(Japan) Mika Miyazato	70-67-76=213	E
T4	(South Korea) Hee Kyung Seo	72-73-68=213	E
T6	(Japan) Ai Miyazato	70-68-76=214	+1
T6	(South Korea) Inbee Park	71-73-70=214	+1
T8	(United States) Paula Creamer	72-70-73=215	+2
T8	(South Korea) In-Kyung Kim	70-69-76=215	+2
T8	(United States) Lizette Salas	69-73-73=215	+2
T8	(Australia) Karrie Webb	70-73-72=215	+2

=== Final round ===
Sunday, July 10, 2011
Monday, July 11, 2011

Place	Player	Score	To par	Money ($)
T1	(South Korea) So Yeon Ryu	74-69-69-69=281	−3	Playoff
T1	(South Korea) Hee Kyung Seo	72-73-68-68=281	−3	Playoff
3	(United States) Cristie Kerr	71-72-69-71=283	−1	215,493
4	(United States) Angela Stanford	72-70-70-72=284	E	150,166
5	(Japan) Mika Miyazato	70-67-76-72=285	+1	121,591
T6	(Japan) Ai Miyazato	70-68-76-72=286	+2	98,128
T6	(Australia) Karrie Webb	70-73-72-71=286	+2	98,128
T6	(South Korea) Inbee Park	71-73-70-72=286	+2	98,128
9	(United States) Ryann O'Toole	69-72-75-71=287	+3	81,915
T10	(South Korea) In-Kyung Kim	70-69-76-73=288	+4	70,996
T10	(South Korea) Jiyai Shin	73-72-73-70=288	+4	70,996
T10	(South Korea) Amy Yang	75-69-73-71=288	+4	70,996

Amateurs: Jutanugarn (+10), Duncan (+16), Tanco (+16), Anderson (+17), Kang (+19)

==== Scorecard ====
Hole	1	2	3	4	5	6	7	8	9	10	11	12	13	14	15	16	17	18
Par	4	4	5	3	4	4	4	3	5	4	4	3	4	4	4	3	5	4
(South Korea) Ryu	−1	−2	−3	−2	−2	−2	−2	−2	−3	−3	−3	−2	−2	−2	−2	−2	−2	−3
(South Korea) Seo	E	−1	−1	−1	−1	−2	−3	−4	−5	−4	−4	−4	−4	−4	−4	−4	−3	−3
(United States) Kerr	−1	−1	−1	−1	−1	−1	−2	−1	−2	−2	−1	−1	−1	−1	−1	−1	−1	−1
(United States) Stanford	−1	−1	−2	−2	−3	−3	−3	−2	−3	−4	−2	−2	−1	E	E	−1	−1	E
(Japan) M. Miyazato	E	E	E	E	E	+1	+1	+1	+1	+1	+2	+3	+3	+2	+1	+1	+1	+1
(Japan) A. Miyazato	E	E	E	E	+1	+2	+2	+1	E	E	+1	+2	+3	+2	+3	+2	+2	+2
(Australia) Webb	+2	+1	E	E	E	E	+1	+2	+1	+1	+2	+2	+2	+1	+2	+2	+2	+2
(South Korea) Park	+1	+1	+1	+1	+1	+1	+2	+2	+1	+2	+1	+1	+1	+1	+1	+1	+2	+2

Cumulative tournament scores, relative to par

=== Playoff ===
Place	Player	Score	To par	Money ($)
1	(South Korea) So Yeon Ryu	3-4-3=10	−2	585,000
2	(South Korea) Hee Kyung Seo	3-6-4=13	+1	350,000

The 3-hole aggregate playoff was contested on holes 16, 17 and 18 (par 3-5-4=12).
