= 2009 LPGA of Korea Tour =

Golf tour season

Dates	Tournament	Location	Prize fund (KRW)	Winner
Dec 19–21	Orient China Ladies Open	(China) Xiamen	$250,000	(South Korea) Choi Hye-yong (2)
Apr 8-10	Asia Today-KYJ Golf Ladies Open	(South Korea) Jeju City	200,000,000	(South Korea) Lee Jeong-eun (1)
Apr 15-17	MBC Tour Lotte Mart Ladies Open	(South Korea) Seogwipo	300,000,000	(South Korea) Seo Hee-kyung (7)
May 1–3	**Taeyoung Cup Korea Women's Open**	(South Korea) Gyeongju	500,000,000	(South Korea) **Seo Hee-kyung** (8)
May 8–10	KB Star Tour First Tourney	(South Korea) Hampyeong	200,000,000	(South Korea) Ahn Sun-ju (6)
May 22–25	Doosan Match Play Championship	(South Korea) Chuncheon	400,000,000	(South Korea) Ryu So-yeon (2)
May 29–31	Hill State Seokyung Open	(South Korea) Yongin	300,000,000	(South Korea) Lee Hyeon-ju (1)
Jun 5-7	Woori Investment & Securities Ladies Championship	(South Korea) Pocheon	300,000,000	(South Korea) Ryu So-yeon (3)
Jun 17-19	MBC Tour S-Oil Champions Invitational	(South Korea) Jeju City	300,000,000	(South Korea) Ryu So-yeon (4)
Aug 14-16	High1 Resort Cup SBS Charity Ladies Open	(South Korea) Jeongseon	800,000,000	(South Korea) Ryu So-yeon (5)
Aug 21-23	Nefs Masterpiece	(South Korea) Seoguipo	500,000,000	(South Korea) Lee Bo-mee (1)
Sep 4-6	KB Star Tour Second Tourney	(South Korea) Gyeongsan	200,000,000	(South Korea) Ahn Sun-ju (7)
Sep 11-13	LG Electronics Ladies Open	(South Korea) Gwangju	400,000,000	(South Korea) Lim Ji-na (2)
Sep 16-18	**Shinsegae KLPGA Championship**	(South Korea) Yeoju	500,000,000	(South Korea) **Lee Jeong-eun** (2)
Oct 15-18	**Hite Cup Championship**	(South Korea) Yeoju	600,000,000	(South Korea) **Seo Hee-kyung** (9)
Oct 22-25	**KB Star Tour Grand Final**	(South Korea) Incheon	500,000,000	(South Korea) **Seo Hee-kyung** (10)
Oct 30-Nov 1	Hana Bank-KOLON Championship	(South Korea) Incheon	$1,700,000	(South Korea) Na Yeon Choi (5)
Nov 6-8	Daishin Securities-Tomato Tour Korean Ladies Masters	(South Korea) Seogwipo	$300,000	(South Korea) Kim Hyun-ji (1)
Nov 20-22	ADT CAPS Championship	(South Korea) Seogwipo	300,000,000	(South Korea) Seo Hee-kyung (11)

Events in bold are majors.

Hana Bank-KOLON Championship is co-sanctioned with LPGA.
Daishin Securities-Tomato Tour Korean Ladies Masters is co-sanctioned with Ladies European Tour.
