= Golf at the 2006 Asian Games – Women's individual =

Women's individual at the 2006 Asian Games
- Venue: Doha Golf Club
- Date: 8–11 December 2006
- Competitors: 24 from 9 nations

Medalists
gold medal	Ryu So-yeon	South Korea
silver medal	Mika Miyazato	Japan
bronze medal	Choi He-yong	South Korea

The women's individual competition at the 2006 Asian Games in Doha was held from 8 December to 11 December at the Doha Golf Club. The Ladies played at 5751 yards with a par 73.

== Schedule ==
All times are Arabia Standard Time (UTC+03:00)

Date	Time	Event
Friday, 8 December 2006	07:00	1st round
Saturday, 9 December 2006	07:00	2nd round
Sunday, 10 December 2006	07:00	3rd round
Monday, 11 December 2006	07:00	Final round

== Results ==
Legend

- DSQ — Disqualified

Rank	Athlete	Round				Total	To par
Rank	Athlete	1	2	3	4	Total	To par
1st place, gold medalist(s)	Ryu So-yeon (KOR)	66	66	64	67	263	−29
2nd place, silver medalist(s)	Mika Miyazato (JPN)	66	68	71	67	272	−20
3rd place, bronze medalist(s)	Choi He-yong (KOR)	71	68	68	66	273	−19
4	Tseng Ya-ni (TPE)	67	68	69	69	273	−19
5	Miki Saiki (JPN)	69	70	70	69	278	−14
6	Erina Hara (JPN)	70	70	68	70	278	−14
7	Yu Pei-lin (TPE)	70	74	63	72	279	−13
8	Feng Shanshan (CHN)	71	71	69	69	280	−12
9	Chung Jae-eun (KOR)	72	74	66	69	281	−11
9	Meghna Bal (IND)	71	70	70	70	281	−11
11	Huang Ping (CHN)	72	73	69	72	286	−6
12	Patcharajutar Kongkraphan (THA)	71	73	74	71	289	−3
13	Dottie Ardina (PHI)	79	70	69	72	290	−2
14	Lu Kwan-chih (TPE)	76	72	74	72	294	+2
15	Cyna Rodriguez (PHI)	71	74	76	74	295	+3
16	Vaishavi Sinha (IND)	74	76	75	74	299	+7
16	Sharmila Nicollet (IND)	77	71	70	81	299	+7
18	Sukintorn Saensradi (THA)	75	79	70	78	302	+10
19	Chabongguid Preamcheun (THA)	78	73	75	77	303	+11
20	Li Wei (CHN)	80	76	72	78	306	+14
21	Myrna Raad (LIB)	81	75	79	76	311	+19
22	Rima Arab (LIB)	84	84	84	84	336	+44
23	Shorouq Al-Suwaidi (QAT)	118	117	119	130	484	+192
—	Anya Tanpinco (PHI)	73	DSQ			DSQ	
