= Golf at the 2006 Asian Games – Women's team =

Women's team at the 2006 Asian Games
- Venue: Doha Golf Club
- Date: 8–11 December 2006
- Competitors: 23 from 8 nations

Medalists
gold medal	South Korea; Choi He-yong, Chung Jae-eun, Ryu So-yeon
silver medal	Japan; Erina Hara, Mika Miyazato, Miki Saiki
bronze medal	Chinese Taipei; Lu Kwan-chih, Tseng Ya-ni, Yu Pei-lin

The women's team competition at the 2006 Asian Games in Doha was held from 8 December to 11 December at the Doha Golf Club. The Ladies played at 5751 yards with a par 73.

== Schedule ==
All times are Arabia Standard Time (UTC+03:00)

Date	Time	Event
Friday, 8 December 2006	07:00	1st round
Saturday, 9 December 2006	07:00	2nd round
Sunday, 10 December 2006	07:00	3rd round
Monday, 11 December 2006	07:00	Final round

== Results ==
Legend

- DSQ — Disqualified

Rank	Team	Round				Total	To par
Rank	Team	1	2	3	4	Total	To par
1st place, gold medalist(s)	South Korea (KOR)	137	134	130	133	534	−50
	Choi He-yong	71	68	~~68~~	66		
	Chung Jae-eun	~~72~~	~~74~~	66	~~69~~		
	Ryu So-yeon	66	66	64	67		
2nd place, silver medalist(s)	Japan (JPN)	135	138	138	136	547	−37
	Erina Hara	~~70~~	~~70~~	68	~~70~~		
	Mika Miyazato	66	68	~~71~~	67		
	Miki Saiki	69	70	70	69		
3rd place, bronze medalist(s)	Chinese Taipei (TPE)	137	140	132	141	550	−34
	Lu Kwan-chih	~~76~~	72	~~74~~	~~72~~		
	Tseng Ya-ni	67	68	69	69		
	Yu Pei-lin	70	~~74~~	63	72		
4	China (CHN)	143	144	138	141	566	−18
	Feng Shanshan	71	71	69	69		
	Huang Ping	72	73	69	72		
	Li Wei	~~80~~	~~76~~	~~72~~	~~78~~		
5	Philippines (PHI)	144	144	137	144	569	−15
	Dottie Ardina	~~79~~	70	69	72		
	Cyna Rodriguez	71	74	~~76~~	~~74~~		
	Anya Tanpinco	73	~~DSQ~~	68	72		
6	India (IND)	145	141	140	144	570	−14
	Meghna Bal	71	70	70	70		
	Sharmila Nicollet	~~77~~	71	70	~~81~~		
	Vaishavi Sinha	74	~~76~~	~~75~~	74		
7	Thailand (THA)	146	146	144	148	584	E
	Patcharajutar Kongkraphan	71	73	74	71		
	Chabongguid Preamcheun	~~78~~	73	~~75~~	77		
	Sukintorn Saensradi	75	~~79~~	70	~~78~~		
8	Lebanon (LIB)	165	159	163	160	647	+63
	Rima Arab	84	84	84	84		
	Myrna Raad	81	75	79	76		
