= Mika Miyazato =

Japanese professional golfer (born 1989)

Mika Miyazato 宮里美香
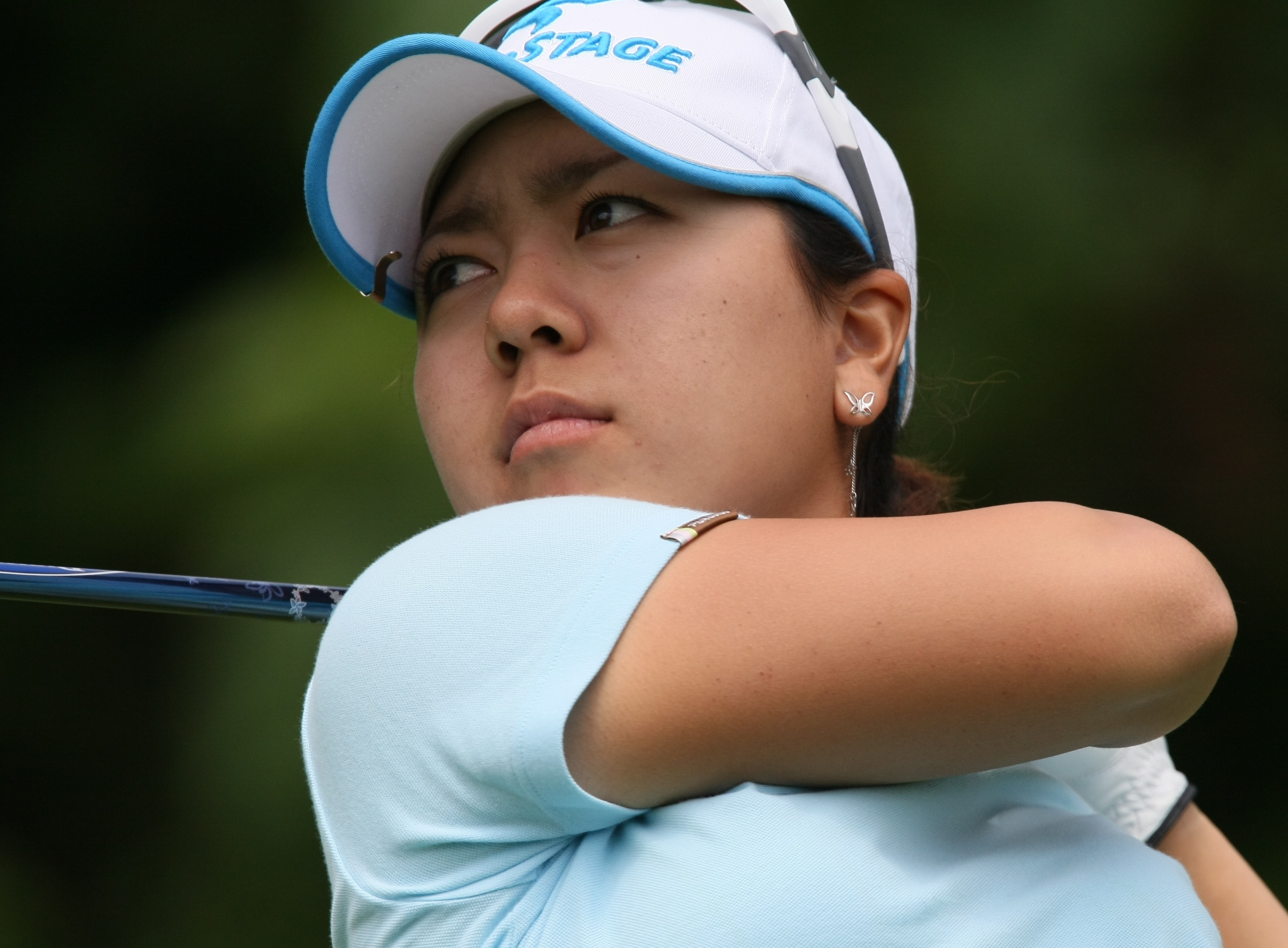
- Miyazato at the 2009 LPGA Championship

Personal information
- Nationality: Japan
- Born: 10 October 1989 (age 37) Naha, Okinawa, Japan
- Height: 5 ft 2 in (1.57 m)

Career
- Sport: Golf
- Turned professional: 2008
- Current tour: LPGA of Japan Tour
- Former tour: LPGA Tour
- Professional wins: 3

Number of wins by tour
- LPGA Tour: 1
- LPGA of Japan Tour: 2

Best results in LPGA major championships
- Chevron Championship: T7: 2011
- Women's PGA C'ship: T2: 2012
- U.S. Women's Open: 5th: 2011
- Women's British Open: 4th: 2012
- Evian Championship: T19: 2013
Medal record
Asian Games
Silver medal – second place	2006 Doha	Individual
Silver medal – second place	2006 Doha	Women's team

Mika Miyazato (Japanese: 宮里美香, born 10 October 1989) is a professional golfer from Japan who has played on the U.S.-based LPGA Tour and the LPGA of Japan Tour.

== Career ==
As an amateur, Miyazato won the 2004 Japan Amateur Women's Championship at the age of 14, and was the youngest player to win the event. In the 2006 Asian Games, she won silver medals in the individual and team competitions. Miyazato turned professional in December 2008, after finishing in a tie for 12th in the LPGA Final Qualifying Tournament, a finish that gave her exempt status on the LPGA Tour. The medalist was Stacy Lewis, with Michelle Wie in a tie for seventh.

In her first season as a professional at age 19, she had fourth-place finishes at the LPGA Corning Classic and Wegmans LPGA tournaments in 2009. Miyazato's first professional victory came at the Japan Women's Open Golf Championship in October 2010. That year, she also had five top-10 finishes on the LPGA Tour, including two third-place results, and was 17th on the money list with more than $600,000 in earnings.

In 2011, Miyazato held the 36-hole lead at the U.S. Women's Open and finished fifth. She had three other top-10s during the season, and won nearly $600,000.

Despite a slow start, 2012 was Miyazato's best season. After missing three successive cuts in the early spring, she lost in the first round of the Sybase Match Play Championship, and did not have a top twenty finish through May. Miyazato rebounded the next week in early June with a tie for third at the ShopRite LPGA Classic in Atlantic City. The following week, she tied for second at the LPGA Championship, two strokes behind winner Shanshan Feng. At her next start at the Walmart NW Arkansas Championship, Miyazato again tied for second. After two additional top ten finishes at the U.S. Women's Open and Jamie Farr Toledo Classic, she won her first LPGA Tour event in August at the Safeway Classic in Oregon. For the season, she earned more than $1 million and had nine top-10 finishes.

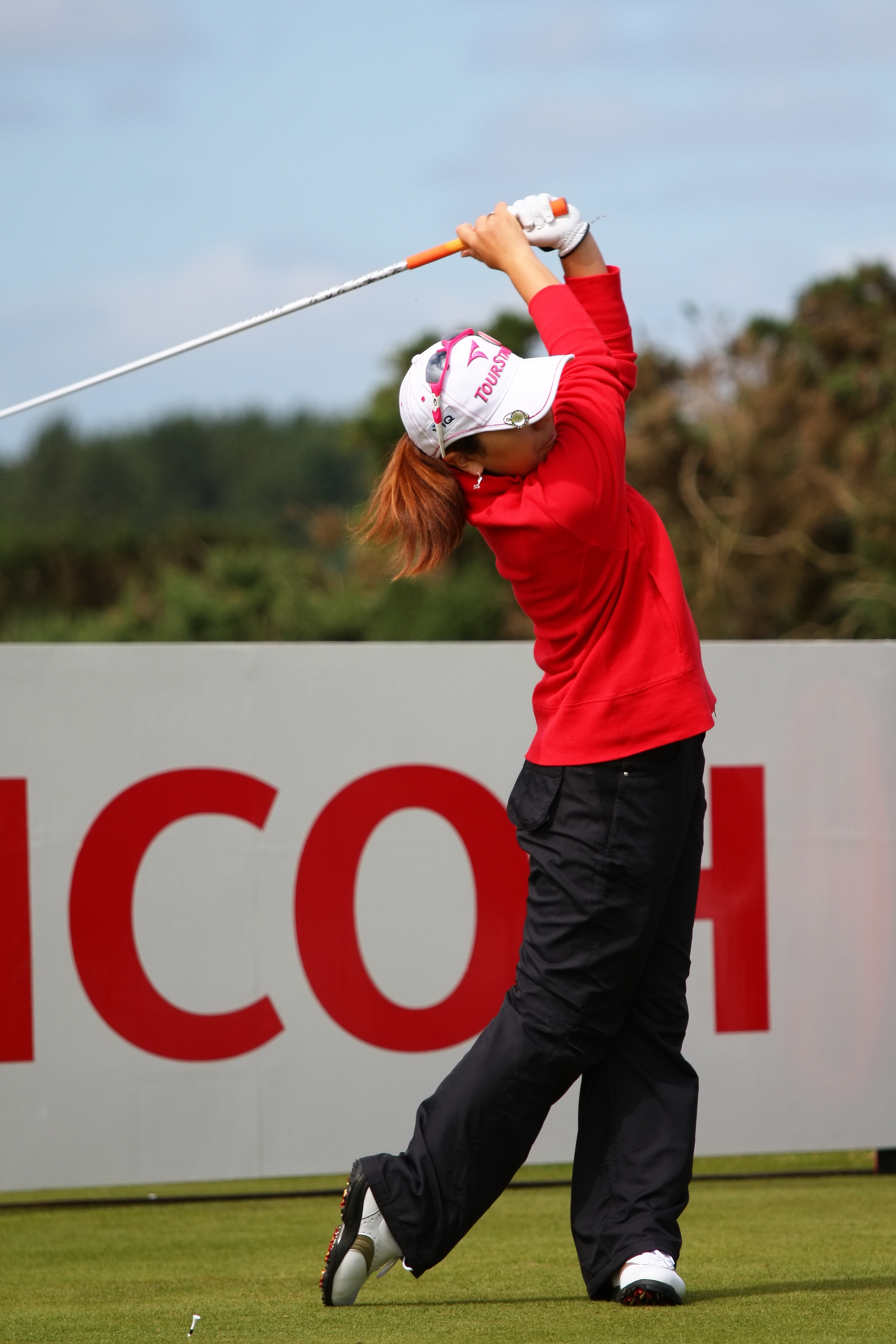
Miyazato hits a tee shot on the 15th hole during the pro-am round of the 2011 Ricoh Women's British Open.

In October 2013, Miyazato won her second Japan Women's Open title. With a birdie on the last hole of the tournament, she defeated Erika Kikuchi and Miki Saiki by one stroke. Miyazato made less than half of her 2012 earnings during the 2013 LPGA Tour season, with a pair of top-10s. Her earnings on the LPGA dipped to about $105,000 in the 2014 season, before climbing back over $500,000 in 2015. Almost $200,000 of her 2015 total came at the Walmart NW Arkansas Championship, where she posted a second-place finish. During the 2016 season, Miyazato's earnings dropped to under $300,000, putting her in 68th place on the LPGA money list. She had one top-10 finish in 2016: a tie for sixth at the ShopRite LPGA Classic. In 2017, she played in 10 LPGA tournaments, missing the cut in eight of them. Miyazato ended the year outside the top 150 in season earnings. Her LPGA schedule in 2018 was limited to two events, a missed cut at the Marathon Classic and a tie for 52nd at the Ladies Scottish Open. In Miyazato's only LPGA appearance of 2019, at the Toto Japan Classic, she tied for 69th.

Although both are from Okinawa, she is not related to former LPGA Tour player Ai Miyazato.

== Professional wins (3) ==
=== LPGA Tour wins (1) ===
No.	Date	Tournament	Winning score	Margin of victory	Runner(s)-up
1	19 Aug 2012	Safeway Classic	–13 (65-68-70=203)	2 strokes	(United States) Brittany Lincicome (South Korea) Inbee Park

=== JLPGA wins (2) ===
No.	Date	Tournament	Winning score	Margin of victory	Runner-up
1	3 Oct 2010	**Japan Women's Open Golf Championship**	–12 (68-67-73-68=276)	6 strokes	(Japan) Miki Saiki
2	6 Oct 2013	**Japan Women's Open Golf Championship**	E (70-70-73-75=288)	1 stroke	(Japan) Erika Kikuchi (Japan) Miki Saiki

Tournaments in bold denotes JLPGA major championships.

== Results in LPGA majors ==
Results not in chronological order before 2015.

Tournament	2009	2010	2011	2012	2013	2014	2015	2016	2017
ANA Inspiration		T40	T7	CUT	T63	CUT	T29	T56	CUT
Women's PGA Championship	T39	13	T8	T2	T22	CUT	T41	T50	
U.S. Women's Open	T57	CUT	5	T7	T31	CUT	CUT	CUT	CUT
Women's British Open	T11	CUT	T14	4	T59	T38	T7	T58	
The Evian Championship ^					T19	T36	T34	T22	

^ The Evian Championship was added as a major in 2013

Top 10
Did not play

CUT = missed the half-way cut
"T" = tied

=== Summary ===
Tournament	Wins	2nd	3rd	Top-5	Top-10	Top-25	Events	Cuts made
ANA Inspiration	0	0	0	0	1	1	8	5
Women's PGA Championship	0	1	0	1	2	4	8	7
U.S. Women's Open	0	0	0	1	2	2	9	4
Women's British Open	0	0	0	1	2	4	8	7
The Evian Championship	0	0	0	0	0	2	4	4
Totals	0	1	0	3	7	13	37	27

- Most consecutive cuts made – 8 (2012 LPGA – 2013 Evian)
- Longest streak of top-10s – 3 (twice)

== LPGA Tour career summary ==
Year	Tournaments played	Cuts made	Wins	2nds	3rds	Top 10s	Best finish	Earnings ($)	Money list rank	Scoring average	Scoring rank
2007	1	1	0	0	0	0	T15	n/a	n/a	70.50	n/a
2009	22	16	0	0	0	3	4	284,788	49	72.70	75
2010	23	19	0	0	2	5	3	608,889	17	71.55	22
2011	20	19	0	0	0	4	5	591,688	22	71.17	12
2012	20	17	1	2	1	9	1	1,098,749	11	70.94	10
2013	21	18	0	0	1	2	3	417,658	36	71.99	50
2014	16	10	0	0	0	0	T21	105,982	91	72.74	104
2015	24	22	0	1	0	5	2	583,141	28	71.18	19
2016	24	21	0	0	0	1	T6	270,663	68	71.72	57
2017	10	2	0	0	0	0	T35	18,390	157	72.29	110
2018	2	1	0	0	0	0	T52	5,298	170	71.50	n/a
2019	1	1	0	0	0	0	T69	0	n/a	73.33	n/a

- official through 2019 season

== World ranking ==
Position in Women's World Golf Rankings at the end of each calendar year.

Year	World ranking	Source
2006	246	
2007	256	
2008	303	
2009	60	
2010	22	
2011	24	
2012	10	
2013	22	
2014	82	
2015	37	
2016	79	
2017	243	
2018	390	
2019	148	
2020	164	
2021	238	
2022	423	
2023	1,210	
2024	301	
2025	532	

== Team appearances ==
Amateur

- Espirito Santo Trophy (representing Japan): 2004, 2006, 2008

Professional

- International Crown (representing Japan): 2014, 2016
