= 2012 LPGA Championship =

Tournament information
- Dates: June 7–10, 2012
- Location: Pittsford, New York, U.S. 43.088°N 77.563°W
- Course: Locust Hill Country Club
- Organized by: LPGA
- Tour: LPGA Tour
- Format: Stroke play - 72 holes

Statistics
- Par: 72
- Length: 6,534 yards (5,975 m)
- Field: 150 players, 73 after cut
- Cut: 151 (+7)
- Prize fund: $2.5 million
- Winner's share: $375,000

Champion
- (China) Shanshan Feng
- 282 (−6)
- Location in the United States Location in New York

The 2012 LPGA Championship was the 58th LPGA Championship, held June 7–10 at Locust Hill Country Club in Pittsford, New York, a suburb southeast of Rochester. Known for sponsorship reasons as the Wegmans LPGA Championship, it was the second of four major championships on the LPGA Tour during the 2012 season. This was the third of four consecutive years the LPGA Championship was played at Locust Hill.

The champion was Shanshan Feng, who won with a 282 (−6), two strokes ahead of four runners-up: Eun-Hee Ji, Stacy Lewis, Mika Miyazato, and Suzann Pettersen. Following the third round, Feng was tied for seventh and three strokes back. In the final round, she shot a bogey-free 67 (−5), the lowest round of the tournament, to secure her first LPGA Tour victory and move from tenth to fifth in the Women's World Golf Rankings. Her best finish in 16 previous majors was a tie for 22nd.

== Course ==
Hole	1	2	3	4	5	6	7	8	9	Out	10	11	12	13	14	15	16	17	18	In	Total
Yards	414	337	380	532	161	439	178	466	172	3,079	413	511	361	386	400	150	356	478	396	3,451	6,530
Par	4	4	4	5	3	4	3	5	3	35	4	5	4	4	4	3	4	5	4	37	72

== Field ==
The field included 150 players from 25 countries, with the cut to the top 70 players and ties after the second round.

== Round summaries ==
=== First round ===
Thursday, June 7, 2012

Place	Player	Score	To par
T1	(United States) Ryann O'Toole	69	−3
T1	(Spain) Beatriz Recari	69	−3
T1	(Italy) Giulia Sergas	69	−3
T4	(South Korea) Na Yeon Choi	70	−2
T4	(United States) Paula Creamer	70	−2
T4	(South Korea) Jeong Jang	70	−2
T4	(United States) Cristie Kerr	70	−2
T4	(Japan) Ai Miyazato	70	−2
T4	(Japan) Mika Miyazato	70	−2
T4	(South Korea) Se Ri Pak	70	−2

=== Second round ===
Friday, June 8, 2012

The cut was at 151 (+7) or better with 73 players advancing to play on the weekend. The cut line was five strokes higher than at the 2011 LPGA Championship.

Place	Player	Score	To par
1	(South Korea) Se Ri Pak	70-71=141	−3
T2	(United States) Paula Creamer	70-72=142	−2
T2	(Germany) Sandra Gal	71-71=142	−2
T2	(Japan) Mika Miyazato	70-72=142	−2
T2	(South Korea) Inbee Park	72-70=142	−2
T6	(South Korea) Na Yeon Choi	70-73=143	−1
T6	(South Korea) Mi Jung Hur	74-69=143	−1
T6	(South Korea) Eun-Hee Ji	75-68=143	−1
T6	(United States) Sydnee Michaels	72-71=143	−1
T6	(Norway) Suzann Pettersen	71-72=143	−1
T6	(South Korea) So Yeon Ryu	73-70=143	−1

=== Third round ===
Saturday, June 9, 2012

Place	Player	Score	To par
1	(South Korea) Eun-Hee Ji	75-68-69=212	−4
2	(Australia) Karrie Webb	74-71-68=213	−3
T3	(United States) Stacy Lewis	72-72-70=214	−2
T3	(South Korea) Inbee Park	72-70-72=214	−2
T3	(Norway) Suzann Pettersen	71-72-71=214	−2
T3	(Italy) Giulia Sergas	69-76-69=214	−2
T7	(United States) Paula Creamer	70-72-73=215	−1
T7	(China) Shanshan Feng	72-73-70=215	−1
T7	(South Korea) Jeong Jang	70-74-71=215	−1
T7	(United States) Jennifer Johnson	73-71-71=215	−1
T7	(United States) Sydnee Michaels	72-71-72=215	−1
T7	(Japan) Mika Miyazato	70-72-73=215	−1
T7	(South Korea) Sun Young Yoo	72-72-71=215	−1

=== Final round ===
Sunday, June 10, 2012

Place	Player	Score	To par	Money ($)
1	(China) Shanshan Feng	72-73-70-67=282	−6	375,000
T2	(South Korea) Eun-Hee Ji	75-68-69-72=284	−4	158,443
T2	(United States) Stacy Lewis	72-72-70-70=284	−4	158,443
T2	(Japan) Mika Miyazato	70-72-73-69=284	−4	158,443
T2	(Norway) Suzann Pettersen	71-72-71-70=284	−4	158,443
T6	(Japan) Ai Miyazato	70-74-73-68=285	−3	73,285
T6	(United States) Gerina Piller	74-71-72-68=285	−3	73,285
T6	(Australia) Karrie Webb	74-71-68-72=285	−3	73,285
T9	(United States) Paula Creamer	70-72-73-71=286	−2	51,742
T9	(South Korea) Inbee Park	72-70-72-72=286	−2	51,742
T9	(Italy) Giulia Sergas	69-76-69-72=286	−2	51,742

==== Scorecard ====
Final round

Hole	1	2	3	4	5	6	7	8	9	10	11	12	13	14	15	16	17	18
Par	4	4	4	5	3	4	3	5	3	4	5	4	4	4	3	4	5	4
(China) Feng	−1	−2	−2	−2	−2	−3	−3	−4	−4	−4	−4	−5	−5	−5	−5	−5	−6	−6
(South Korea) Ji	−4	−4	−4	−4	−4	−4	−4	−4	−3	−2	−2	−1	−2	−2	−3	−4	−4	−4
(United States) Lewis	−2	−2	−2	−2	−2	−2	−3	−3	−3	−2	−1	−2	−3	−3	−3	−3	−4	−4
(Japan) M. Miyazato	−1	−1	−1	−2	−2	−2	−2	−2	−2	−2	−1	−1	−2	−2	−2	−3	−4	−4
(Norway) Pettersen	−2	−3	−4	−4	−5	−4	−4	−5	−5	−5	−5	−5	−4	−3	−3	−3	−4	−4
(Japan) A. Miyazato	+1	+1	+1	E	E	E	−1	−1	−2	−2	−2	−2	−2	−2	−3	−3	−3	−3
(United States) Piller	E	−1	−1	−1	−2	−1	−1	−2	−2	−2	−3	−3	−3	−4	−4	−5	−3	−3
(Australia) Webb	−4	−4	−3	−3	−3	−3	−2	−3	−3	−3	−4	−3	−3	−2	−2	−3	−4	−3

Cumulative tournament scores, relative to par

Birdie	Bogey	Double bogey
