= Jean Chua =

Personal information
- Full name: Jean Tze Chua
- Nationality: Malaysia
- Born: 29 August 1987 (age 39) Kuala Lumpur, Malaysia
- Height: 5 ft 5 in (1.65 m)

Career
- Sport: Golf
- College: Wake Forest University
- Turned professional: 2009
- Former tour: Symetra Tour (2012–2017)
- Professional wins: 1

Best results in LPGA major championships
- U.S. Women's Open: T59: 2011

Jean Tze Chua (born 29 August, 1987) is a Malaysian professional golfer.

== Career ==
Chua graduated from Wake Forest University, North Carolina in May 2009 and turned professional in August 2009. She won in her debut as a professional at the Thai LPGA Open on the Thai LPGA Tour in August 2009.

In 2011, she qualified for the U.S. Women's Open at The Broadmoor East Course in Colorado in which she finished tied for 59th.
