= 1996 LPGA Championship =

Tournament information
- Dates: May 9–12, 1996
- Location: Wilmington, Delaware; 39.789°N 75.564°W
- Course: DuPont Country Club
- Tour: LPGA Tour
- Format: Stroke play - 72 holes (reduced to 54 holes)

Statistics
- Par: 71
- Length: 6,386 yards (5,839 m)
- Cut: 148 (+6)
- Prize fund: $1.2 million
- Winner's share: $180,000

Champion
- (England) Laura Davies
- 213 (Even)
- Location in United States Location in Delaware

The 1996 LPGA Championship was the 42nd LPGA Championship, played May 9–12 at DuPont Country Club in Wilmington, Delaware.

Laura Davies won the second of her two LPGA Championship titles at even par, one stroke ahead of runner-up Julie Piers. It was the third of Davies' four major titles. Rain and wind hampered play; the first round was delayed until Friday and the second round was not completed until Sunday morning; the championship was reduced to 54 holes and ended on Sunday. It was the first women's major in twelve years to have a winning score of par or above, last at the 1984 U.S. Women's Open.

This was the third of eleven consecutive LPGA Championships at DuPont Country Club.

== Final leaderboard ==
Sunday, May 12, 1996

Place	Player	Score	To par	Money ($)
1	(England) Laura Davies	72-71-70=213	E	180,000
2	(United States) Julie Piers	72-72-70=214	+1	111,711
T3	(Australia) Jane Crafter	75-68-72=215	+2	72,461
T3	(United States) Penny Hammel	73-72-70=215	+2	72,461
T5	(United States) Judy Dickinson	71-74-71=216	+3	37,800
T5	(United States) Shirley Furlong	70-73-73=216	+3	37,800
T5	(United States) Juli Inkster	70-73-73=216	+3	37,800
T5	(Japan) Hiromi Kobayashi	71-70-75=216	+3	37,800
T5	(United States) Val Skinner	73-69-74=216	+3	37,800
T10	(United States) Kristi Albers	72-71-74=217	+4	22,342
T10	(United States) Michelle Dobek	72-75-70=217	+4	22,342
T10	(United States) Meg Mallon	69-75-73=217	+4	22,342
T10	(United States) Patty Sheehan	72-74-71=217	+4	22,342
