= 2012 Kraft Nabisco Championship =

Coordinates: 33.798°N 116.433°W

Tournament information
- Dates: March 29 – April 1, 2012
- Location: Rancho Mirage, California
- Courses: Mission Hills Country Club; Dinah Shore Tourn. Course
- Tour: LPGA Tour
- Format: Stroke play - 72 holes

Statistics
- Par: 72
- Length: 6,738 yards (6,161 m)
- Field: 117 players, 82 after cut
- Cut: 148 (+4)
- Prize fund: $2.0 million
- Winner's share: $300,000

Champion
- (South Korea) Sun-Young Yoo
- 279 (−9), playoff

Location in the United States
Location in California

The 2012 Kraft Nabisco Championship was played at Mission Hills Country Club in Rancho Mirage, California, from March 29 through April 1. It was the 41st edition of the Kraft Nabisco Championship and its 30th year as a women's major.

On the 72nd hole, I.K. Kim had a one-foot (0.3 m) putt to seal her first major title. The putt lipped out, forcing a playoff with Sun-Young Yoo, who also shot 69 in the final round. Yoo won the sudden-death playoff with a birdie on the first extra hole. Yani Tseng, the 2010 champion, missed the playoff by a stroke; defending champion Stacy Lewis finished two strokes back, in a tie for fourth.

== Field ==
The field was 117 players, including 110 professionals and seven amateurs. The 36-hole cut was the top 70 players and ties; it was at 148 (+4) and 82 players advanced to the weekend.

== Round summaries ==
=== First round ===
Thursday, March 29, 2012

Amy Yang shot a six-under 66 to claim the lead after the first round on Friday. Lindsey Wright shot 67 for second place and world number one and 2010 winner Yani Tseng shot four-under 68 for third place. Defending champion Stacy Lewis was tied for sixtieth at 74 (+2).

Place	Player	Score	To par
1	(South Korea) Amy Yang	66	−6
2	(Australia) Lindsey Wright	67	−5
3	(Taiwan) Yani Tseng	68	−4
T4	(United States) Nicole Castrale	69	−3
T4	(United States) Paula Creamer	69	−3
T4	(England) Jodi Ewart	69	−3
T4	(Australia) Katherine Hull	69	−3
T4	(South Korea) Haeji Kang	69	−3
T4	(South Korea) Hee Kyung Seo	69	−3
T4	(South Korea) Sun-Young Yoo	69	−3

=== Second round ===
Friday, March 30, 2012

Yani Tseng moved into first place after 36 holes with another 68 and Haeji Kang was one stroke back. The biggest movers into the top five were Karin Sjödin and Na Yeon Choi; both shot 67 and moved into a tie for fifth. The cut was at 148 (+4) and 82 players advanced.

Place	Player	Score	To par
1	(Taiwan) Yani Tseng	68-68=136	−8
2	(South Korea) Haeji Kang	69-68=137	−7
T3	(Australia) Lindsey Wright	67-71=138	−6
T3	(South Korea) Sun-Young Yoo	69-69=138	−6
T5	(South Korea) Na Yeon Choi	72-67=139	−5
T5	(Sweden) Karin Sjödin	72-67=139	−5
T5	(South Korea) Se Ri Pak	70-69=139	−5
T8	(United States) Vicky Hurst	70-70=140	−4
T8	(South Korea) Eun-Hee Ji	71-69=140	−4
T8	(South Korea) I.K. Kim	70-70=140	−4
T8	(Japan) Momoko Ueda	71-69=140	−4
T8	(South Korea) Amy Yang	66-74=140	−4

Source: Amateurs: Jutanugarn (E), Ernst (+3), Hull (+4), Lee (+11).

=== Third round ===
Saturday, March 31, 2012

Place	Player	Score	To par
T1	(Sweden) Karin Sjödin	72-67-68=207	−9
T1	(Taiwan) Yani Tseng	68-68-71=207	−9
3	(South Korea) Haeji Kang	69-68-72=209	−7
T4	(South Korea) Na Yeon Choi	72-67-71=210	−6
T4	(South Korea) Eun-Hee Ji	71-69-70=210	−6
T4	(South Korea) I.K. Kim	70-70-70=210	−6
T4	(South Korea) Hee Kyung Seo	69-72-69=210	−6
T4	(South Korea) Sun-Young Yoo	69-69-72=210	−6
T9	(Australia) Katherine Hull	69-73-69=211	−5
T9	(United States) Vicky Hurst	70-70-71=211	−5
T9	(South Korea) Se Ri Pak	70-69-72=211	−5

=== Final round ===
Sunday, April 1, 2012

Place	Player	Score	To par	Money ($)
T1	(South Korea) Sun-Young Yoo	69-69-72-69=279	−9	Playoff
T1	(South Korea) I.K. Kim	70-70-70-69=279	−9	Playoff
3	(Taiwan) Yani Tseng	68-68-71-73=280	−8	132,418
T4	(United States) Stacy Lewis	74-71-70-66=281	−7	77,202
T4	(South Korea) Hee Kyung Seo	69-72-69-71=281	−7	77,202
T4	(Sweden) Karin Sjödin	72-67-68-74=281	−7	77,202
T4	(South Korea) Amy Yang	66-74-72-69=281	−7	77,202
T8	(South Korea) Na Yeon Choi	72-67-71-72=282	−6	44,806
T8	(United States) Natalie Gulbis	76-71-70-65=282	−6	44,806
T8	(South Korea) Se Ri Pak	70-69-72-71=282	−6	44,806

Amateurs: Jutanugarn (−2), Hull (+1), Ernst (+4).

==== Scorecard ====
Final round

Hole	1	2	3	4	5	6	7	8	9	10	11	12	13	14	15	16	17	18
Par	4	5	4	4	3	4	4	3	5	4	5	4	4	3	4	4	3	5
(South Korea) Yoo	−7	−7	−6	−6	−7	−7	−7	−7	−6	−6	−7	−8	−8	−8	−9	−9	−9	−9
(South Korea) Kim	−6	−6	−6	−6	−6	−6	−6	−7	−7	−7	−7	−7	−7	−8	−8	−9	−10	−9
(Taiwan) Tseng	−8	−8	−8	−8	−7	−7	−7	−6	−6	−6	−6	−7	−7	−7	−7	−7	−8	−8
(Sweden) Sjödin	−9	−11	−11	−11	−11	−10	−10	−10	−9	−8	−8	−8	−9	−9	−9	−8	−7	−7

Cumulative tournament scores, relative to par

Eagle	Birdie	Bogey

==== Playoff ====
The sudden-death playoff began on the par-5 18th hole; Yoo birdied to win the title.

Place	Player	Score	To par	Money ($)
1	(South Korea) Sun-Young Yoo	4	−1	300,000
2	(South Korea) I.K. Kim	5	E	182,538
