= 2004 Espirito Santo Trophy =

Tournament information
- Dates: 20–23 October
- Location: Río Grande, Puerto Rico; 18.2223°N 66.4303°W
- Courses: Rio Mar Country Club (Ocean Course and River Course)
- Organized by: International Golf Federation (formerly named World Amateur Golf Council)
- Format: 72 holes stroke play

Statistics
- Par: Ocean: 72; River: 72
- Length: Ocean: 6,159 yards (5,632 m); River:5,956 yards (5,446 m)
- Field: 48 teams 141 players

Champion
- Sweden; Sofie Andersson, Karin Sjödin, Louise Stahle
- 567 (−9)
- Location in North America Location in the Caribbean Location in Puerto Rico

The 2004 Espirito Santo Trophy was the 21st edition of the women's golf World Amateur Team Championship for the Espirito Santo Trophy. It took place from 20 to 23 October at the Rio Mar Country Club in Río Grande, Puerto Rico, utilizing both the River Course and the Ocean Course.

The tournament was a 72-hole stroke-play team event featuring 48 teams, each consisting of two or three players. Every team played two rounds on the River Course and two on the Ocean Course, with the leading teams playing the final round on the Ocean Course. The best two scores from each team per round counted toward the final total.

Sweden won the trophy, securing their first title in the event. The silver medal was shared by Canada and the United States, who tied for second place, three strokes behind the champions. The defending champions, Australia, finished in 16th place.

The individual title was shared between Julieta Granada, Paraguay, and Karin Sjödin, Sweden, whose score of 8-under-par, 280, was four strokes ahead of Jane Park, United States.

== Teams ==
48 teams entered the event and 47 teams completed the competition. Each team had three players, except the teams from Egypt, Greece and Lithuania, which had only two players. One player representing Virgin Islands withdraw from the third and fourth round and one player representing Lithuania withdraw from the third and fourth round thereby withdrawing the team from the competition.

Country	Players
Argentina	Maria de los Angeles Gallegos, Maria Olivero, Manuela Tarazona
Australia	Katy Jarochowicz, Sarah Kemp, Sarah Jane Kenyon
Austria	Stefanie Endstrasser, Nicole Gergely, Stefanie Michl
Bahamas	Sandi Macdougall, Giselle Pyfrom, Raquel Riley
Belgium	Justine Barbier, Tamara Luccioli, Lien Willems
Bermuda	Kim Botelho, Ebonie Burgess, Laura Robinson
Brazil	Mariana De Biase, Patricia Carvalho, Ruriko Nakamura
Canada	Lindsay Knowlton, Mary Ann Lapointe, Laura Matthews
Chile	Paz Echeverria, Mariá José Hurtado, Anita Ojeda
China	Bai Yun Yan, Shanshan Feng, Li Wei
Chinese Taipei	Hsiao-Ching Lu, Yani Tseng, Pei-Lin Yu
Colombia	Paola Moreno, Juliana Murcia, Eileen Vargas
Croatia	Snjezana Crnoglava, Sanja Serfezi Lovric, Daria Zubrinic
Czech Republic	Petra Kvídová, Zuzana Mašínová, Lucie Sarochová
Dominican Republic	Teresa Garciá, Maria Hurtado, Anabelle Paulino
Egypt	Naela El Attar, Donia Scarello
El Salvador	Luciana de Alfaro, Joyce S. de Castro, Claudia Peters-Gillessen
Finland	Sohvi Harkonen, Kaisa Ruuttila, Hanna-Leena Salonen
France	Anne-Lise Caudal, Anne-Sophie LeNalio, Marion Sapin
Germany	Sandra Gal, Pia Odefey, Denise Simon
Great Britain & Ireland	Emma Duggleby, Stephanie Evans, Clare Queen
Greece	Irene Krambs, Evita Sideri
Guatemala	Pamela Abreu, Maria Cristina Arenas, Beatriz de Arenas
Italy	Giusy Paolillo, Anna Rossi, Vittoria Valvassori
Japan	Erina Hara, Mika Miyazato, Shinobu Moromizato
Lithuania	Rose Covalesky, Lydia Siipola
Mexico	Lili Alvarez, Tanya Dergal, Alejandra Martin Del Campo
Netherlands	Myrte Eikenaar, Dewi Claire Schreefel, Marie-Louise Weeda
New Zealand	Claire Dury, Penny Newbrook, Sarah Nicholson
Norway	June Bolme, Lene Krog, Marianne Skarpnord
Panama	Maria Elena de Duran, Ana Maria de Hernandez, Maria Elena Duran
Paraguay	Maria Del Mar Troche, Julieta Granada, Kathia Meyer
Peru	Maria Pia Castro, Kiara Hayashida, Maria Salinas
Philippines	Javie Agojo, Loralie Roberto, Ana Tanpinco
Portugal	Carolina Catanho, Carla Cruz, Lara Vieira
Puerto Rico	Maria del Mar Colon, Laura Diaz, Janice Olivencia
Russia	Anastasia Kostina, Galina Rotmistrova, Maria Verchenova
Slovakia	Veronika Falathová, Zuzana Kamasová, Renata Petrasová
South Africa	Lee-Anne Pace, Ashleigh Simon, Sandra Winter
South Korea	Song-Hee Kim, Park Hee-young, Yoo Sun-young
Spain	Maria Hernández, Beatriz Recari, Elisa Serramià
Sweden	Sofie Andersson, Karin Sjödin, Louise Stahle
Switzerland	Niloufar Aazam-Zanganeh, Nora Angehrn, Fabienne In-Albon
Trinidad and Tobago	Tracey Clarke, Diana Torry, Michelle Torry
Turkey	Necla Gerçek, Zakire Korkmaz, Elçin Ulu
United States	Paula Creamer, Sarah Huarte, Jane Park
United States Virgin Islands	Merrilee Bailey, Barbara O'Brien, Lisa Schmid
Venezuela	Stephanie Gelleni, Maria E. Martinez, Aymara Villarroel

== Results ==
Place	Country	Score	To par
1	Sweden	144-141-142-145=567	−9
T2	Canada	137-145-143-145=570	−6
T2	United States	139-147-144-140=570	−6
T4	Chinese Taipei	143-152-141-143=579	+3
T4	Japan	147-147-139-146=579	+3
T4	South Korea	142-148-144-145=579	+3
7	Colombia	149-140-143-149=581	+5
8	Spain	144-145-149-145=583	+7
T9	Germany	144-152-139-154=589	+13
T9	New Zealand	152-146-146-145=589	+13
T11	Russia	145-150-144-151=590	+14
T11	Venezuela	145-156-144-145=590	+14
13	Netherlands	148-150-147-146=591	+15
T14	Belgium	146-149-152-149=596	+20
T14	Paraguay	155-151-140-150=596	+20
16	Australia	152-154-142-149=597	+21
17	South Africa	147-153-147-151=598	+22
T18	France	149-149-151-150=599	+23
T18	Philippines	159-156-144-140=599	+23
T20	Austria	148-154-145-153=600	+24
T20	Italy	155-151-148-146=600	+24
22	Mexico	145-151-151-155=602	+26
T23	Finland	149-153-151-150=603	+27
T23	Norway	150-152-148-153=603	+27
25	Great Britain & Ireland	149-151-146-158=604	+28
26	Chile	152-159-150-146=607	+31
27	Switzerland	154-153-158-143=608	+32
28	China	157-154-154-144=609	+33
29	Argentina	146-163-149-154=612	+36
30	Brazil	156-158-154-146=614	+38
T31	Peru	157-160-155-158=630	+54
T31	Portugal	154-165-158-153=630	+54
33	Guatemala	168-153-157-162=640	+64
34	Trinidad and Tobago	160-158-163-162=643	+67
T35	Czech Republic	165-170-157-155=647	+71
T35	Slovakia	170-164-157-156=647	+71
37	Puerto Rico	164-164-161-159=648	+72
38	Bahamas	169-168-155-159=651	+75
39	Bermuda	166-167-161-158=652	+76
40	Egypt	180-167-164-165=676	+100
41	Turkey	174-159-175-174=682	+106
42	Dominican Republic	176-168-172-171=687	+111
43	El Salvador	184-181-176-171=712	+136
44	Croatia	192-171-190-165=718	+142
45	Greece	176-167-190-190=723	+147
46	Panama	183-192-187-180=742	+166
47	United States Virgin Islands	201-194-197-192=784	+208
WD	Lithuania	208-218-WD	

== Individual leaders ==
There was no official recognition for the lowest individual scores.

Place	Player	Country	Score	To par
T1	Julieta Granada	Paraguay	76-72-63-69=280	−8
T1	Karin Sjödin	Sweden	69-70-71-70=280	−8
3	Jane Park	United States	69-71-73-71=284	−4
T4	Maria E. Martinez	Venezuela	69-75-71-70=285	−3
T4	Laura Matthews	Canada	70-70-72-73=285	−3
T4	Yani Tseng	Chinese Taipei	73-74-69-69=285	−3
7	Paula Creamer	United States	70-76-71-69=286	−2
8	Anastasia Kostina	Russia	70-73-69-75=287	−1
T9	Mary Ann Lapointe	Canada	67-78-71-72=288	E
T9	Louise Stahle	Sweden	75-71-72-70=288	E
