= Julie Piers =

American professional golfer (born 1962)

Personal information
- Full name: Julie Larsen Piers
- Nationality: United States
- Born: September 16, 1962 (age 64) Westchester, New York, U.S.
- Height: 5 ft 8 in (1.73 m)

Career
- Sport: Golf
- College: Rollins College
- Status: Professional
- Former tours: LPGA Tour; Ladies European Tour; Futures Tour
- Professional wins: 1

Number of wins by tour
- LPGA Tour: 1

Best results in LPGA major championships
- Chevron Championship: T32: 1995
- Women's PGA C'ship: 2nd: 1996
- U.S. Women's Open: T7: 1995
- du Maurier Classic: T25: 1995
- Women's British Open: DNP

Julie Larsen Piers (born September 16, 1962) is an American professional golfer. She played on the LPGA Tour. She played under both her maiden name, Julie Larsen, and her married name, Julie Piers (since 1995).

== Career ==
Larsen played on the Futures Tour and Ladies European Tour. In 1992, she joined the LPGA Tour. She won once on the LPGA Tour in 1995.

The best finish for Piers in major championship came at the 1996 LPGA Championship. A sudden-death playoff between Piers and Laura Davies was narrowly averted when Davies sank an eight-foot par putt on the last hole of the tournament. Piers finished in solo second place.

== Professional wins ==
=== LPGA Tour wins (1) ===
No.	Date	Tournament	Winning score	Margin of victory	Runner-up
1	Jun 11, 1995	Edina Realty LPGA Classic	−11 (66-68-71=205)	1 stroke	(United States) Leigh Ann Mills
