= 2012 LPGA of Japan Tour =

The 2012 LPGA of Japan Tour was the 45th season of the LPGA of Japan Tour, the professional golf tour for women operated by the Ladies Professional Golfers' Association of Japan. It consisted of 35 golf tournaments, all played in Japan.

Leading money winner was Jeon Mi-jeong with ¥132,380,915. She also won the Mercedes Ranking, had the lowest scoring average and finished most often (22 times) inside the top-10.

== Schedule ==
The number in parentheses after winners' names show the player's total number wins in official money individual events on the LPGA of Japan Tour, including that event.

Dates	Tournament	Location	Prize fund (¥)	Winner
Mar 2–4	Daikin Orchid Ladies	Okinawa	80,000,000	(Japan) Airi Saitoh (1)
Mar 9–11	Yokohama Tire PRGR Ladies Cup	Kōchi	80,000,000	(South Korea) Lee Bo-mee (1)
Mar 16–18	T-Point Ladies	Kagoshima	70,000,000	(South Korea) Lee Ji-hee (16)
Mar 30 – Apr 1	Yamaha Ladies Open	Shizuoka	100,000,000	(Japan) Ritsuko Ryu (2)
Apr 6–8	Studio Alice Women's Open	Hyogo	60,000,000	(Japan) Miki Saiki (4)
Apr 13–15	Nishijin Ladies Classic	Kumamoto	70,000,000	(Japan) Maiko Wakabayashi (2)
Apr 20–22	Fujisankei Ladies Classic	Shizuoka	80,000,000	(Japan) Kaori Ohe (1)
Apr 27–29	CyberAgent Ladies	Chiba	70,000,000	(Japan) Chie Arimura (11)
May 3–6	**World Ladies Championship Salonpas Cup**	Ibaraki	90,000,000	(South Korea) Ahn Sun-ju (9)
May 11–13	Fundokin Ladies	Fukuoka	80,000,000	(South Korea) Inbee Park (4)
May 18–20	Chukyo TV Bridgestone Ladies Open	Aichi	70,000,000	(South Korea) Lee Ji-hee (17)
May 25–27	Yonex Ladies	Niigata	60,000,000	(China) Shanshan Feng (3)
Jun 1–3	Resort Trust Ladies	Nagano	70,000,000	(South Korea) Jeon Mi-jeong (18)
Jun 7–10	Suntory Ladies Open	Hyogo	100,000,000	(South Korea) Kim Hyo-joo (am) (n/a)
Jun 15–17	Nichirei Ladies	Chiba	80,000,000	(South Korea) Shin Hyun-ju (6)
Jun 22–24	Earth Mondahmin Cup	Chiba	100,000,000	(Japan) Mayu Hattori (4)
Jun 29 – Jul 1	Nichi-Iko Women's Open	Toyama	60,000,000	(South Korea) Jeon Mi-jeong (19)
Jul 13–15	Stanley Ladies	Shizuoka	90,000,000	(Japan) Chie Arimura (12)
Jul 20–22	Samantha Thavasa Girls Collection Ladies	Ibaraki	60,000,000	(Japan) Megumi Kido (1)
Aug 3–5	Meiji Cup	Hokkaido	90,000,000	(China) Shanshan Feng (4)
Aug 10–12	NEC Karuizawa 72	Nagano	70,000,000	(Japan) Yumiko Yoshida (1)
Aug 17–19	CAT Ladies	Kanagawa	60,000,000	(South Korea) Jeon Mi-jeong (20)
Aug 24–26	Nitori Ladies	Hokkaido	100,000,000	(South Korea) Ahn Sun-ju (10)
Aug 31 – Sep 2	Golf5 Ladies	Gifu	60,000,000	(South Korea) Ahn Sun-ju (11)
Sep 6–9	**Japan LPGA Championship Konica Minolta Cup**	Shiga	140,000,000	(Japan) Chie Arimura (13)
Sep 14–16	Munsingwear Ladies Tokai Classic	Aichi	80,000,000	(Japan) Natsu Nagai (1)
Sep 21–23	Miyagi TV Cup Dunlop Women's Open	Miyagi	70,000,000	(Japan) Rikako Morita (2)
Sep 27–30	**Japan Women's Open Golf Championship**	Kanagawa	140,000,000	(China) Shanshan Feng (5)
Oct 12–14	Fujitsu Ladies	Chiba	80,000,000	(Japan) Misuzu Narita (1)
Oct 19–21	Masters GC Ladies	Hyogo	123,000,000	(South Korea) Kim So-hee (2)
Oct 26–28	Hisako Higuchi – Morinaga Weider Ladies	Chiba	70,000,000	(South Korea) Jeon Mi-jeong (21)
Nov 2–4	Mizuno Classic	Mie	US$1,200,000	(United States) Stacy Lewis (n/a)
Nov 9–11	Ito En Ladies	Chiba	90,000,000	(South Korea) Lee Bo-mee (2)
Nov 16–18	Daio Paper Elleair Ladies Open	Fukushima	90,000,000	(Japan) Miki Saiki (5)
Nov 22–25	**Japan LPGA Tour Championship Ricoh Cup**	Miyazaki	100,000,000	(South Korea) Lee Bo-mee (3)

Events in bold are majors.

The Mizuno Classic is co-sanctioned with the LPGA Tour.
