= Buick Championship (Ladies European Tour) =

Golf tournament

Coordinates: 31.1343°N 121.2829°E

Tournament information
- Location: Shanghai, China
- Established: 2014
- Course: Qizhong Golf Club
- Par: 72
- Tours: Ladies European Tour; China LPGA Tour
- Format: Stroke play
- Prize fund: $600,000
- Month played: May
- Final year: 2016

Tournament record score
- Aggregate: 271 Shanshan Feng (2015)
- To par: −17 as above

Final champion
- (China) Shanshan Feng

Location in China

The Buick Championship was a golf tournament co-sanctioned by the Ladies European Tour and the China LPGA Tour since 2015. It was first played as the Buick Ladies Invitational on the China LPGA Tour in 2014 and was held at the Qizhong Golf Club in Shanghai, China.

== Winners ==
Year	Winner	Country	Score
Buick Championship
2016	Shanshan Feng (2)	China	274 (−14)*
2015	Shanshan Feng	China	271 (−17)
Buick Ladies Invitational
2014	Pan Yanhong	Chinese Taipei	280 (−8)

* Won in a playoff
