= Karin Sjödin =

Swedish professional golfer

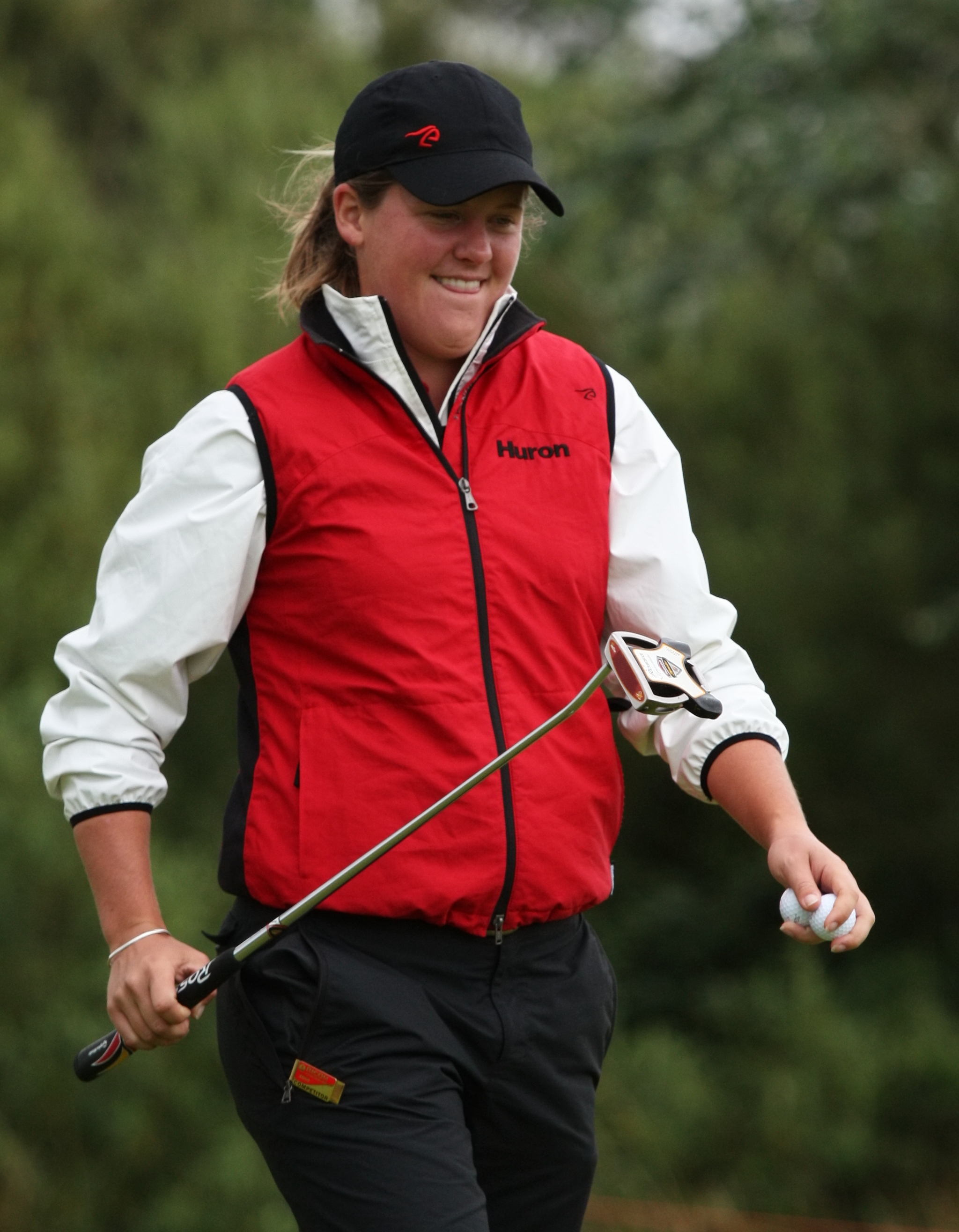
- Sjödin at the 2009 Women's British Open

Personal information
- Nationality: Sweden
- Born: 8 August 1983 (age 43) Gothenburg, Sweden
- Height: 5 ft 8 in (1.73 m)

Career
- Sport: Golf
- College: Oklahoma State University
- Turned professional: 2005
- Former tour: LPGA Tour (2006–2015)
- Professional wins: 1

Best results in LPGA major championships
- Chevron Championship: T4: 2012
- Women's PGA C'ship: T15: 2012
- U.S. Women's Open: T42: 2011
- Women's British Open: T48: 2008
- Evian Championship: DNP

Achievements and awards
- Dinah Shore Trophy Award: 2005
- Edith Cummings Munson Golf Award: 2005

Karin Sjödin (born 8 August 1983) is a Swedish professional golfer. She played 10 seasons on the U.S.-based LPGA Tour and was in contention at the 2012 Kraft Nabisco Championship.

== Early life ==
In 1983, Sjödin was born in Gothenburg, Sweden. She learned golf at Delsjö Golf Club, located close to the city.

== Amateur career ==
In 2000, she won the Swedish Junior Match-play Championship and, still as an amateur, the Öijared Ladies Open on the Swedish Golf Tour, at the time named the Telia Tour.

She was part of the Swedish team winning the 2000 European Girls' Team Championship at home soil in Stockholm, Sweden. She was also part of the Swedish teams capturing the silver medal at the 2002 European Lady Junior's Team Championship and the bronze medal at the 2003 European Ladies' Team Championship.

Sjödin played in the 2002 and 2004 Espirito Santo Trophy (World Amateur Golf Team Championships) finishing on the victorious Swedish side and as individual champion in 2004.

=== College career ===
Sjödin played college golf at Oklahoma State University where she won three events, the 2002 Topy Cup, the 2004 Mercedes-Benz of Bend Women's Fall Preview and 2004 Edean Ihlanfeldt Invitational. She was named NGCA All-America Honorable Mention from 2003 to 2004, First-Team All-American in 2005, Big 12 Newcomer of the Year and Second-Team All-Big 12 in 2003, and First-Team Academic All-American from 2003 to 2005. She was the NCAA individual runner-up in 2004. and named First-Team All-Big 12 in 2004 and 2005.

Sjödin was awarded the 2005 Dinah Shore Trophy Award. Winners must have an overall grade point average (GPA) of at least 3.2 on a 4.0 scale, have played in at least 50% of her team's scheduled events, maintained a scoring average of 78 or less and demonstrated leadership skills and/or extraordinary community affairs work. She also received the 2005 Edith Cummings Munson Golf Award which goes to the student-athlete who is both an NGCA All-American Scholar and an NGCA All-American, with the award going to the highest GPA score in the event of a tie.

== Professional career ==
In 2005, Sjödin turned professional. She earned exempt status for the 2006 LPGA Tour season by finishing tied for 16th at the LPGA Final Qualifying Tournament.

She led the tour in average driving distance for the 2006 season, at 284.5 yards and received a special invitation to compete in the World Long Drive Championship, where she finished seventh.

Sjödin played in 24 majors. She shared the lead at the 2012 Kraft Nabisco Championship with Yani Tseng after three rounds. She finished the tournament tied fourth, two strokes behind Sun-Young Yoo.

In 2012, she received Elit Sign number 138 by the Swedish Golf Federation based on world ranking achievements.

Sjödin sustained a back injury in 2013 and retired after the 2015 LPGA Tour season. In 2016 she was appointed head pro at Borre Golfklubb in Horten, north of Tønsberg, Norway.

== Amateur wins ==
- 2000 Swedish Junior Matchplay Championship

== Professional wins (1) ==
=== Swedish Golf Tour wins (1) ===
Date	Tournament	Winning score	To par	Margin of victory	Runner(s)-up	Ref
2 Sep 2000	Öijared Ladies Open (as an amateur)	74-68-77=219	+3	1 stroke	(Sweden) Isabelle Rosberg	

== Results in LPGA majors ==
Results not in chronological order before 2015.

Tournament	2005	2006	2007	2008	2009	2010	2011	2012	2013	2014	2015
ANA Inspiration	CUT			CUT			CUT	T4	T52		
Women's PGA Championship		T61	T59	CUT	T57	T19	T43	T15		T37	CUT
U.S. Women's Open		T49	T63	T58			T42				
Women's British Open		CUT	CUT	T48	70	CUT		CUT			
The Evian Championship ^											

^ The Evian Championship was added as a major in 2013.

Win
Top 10
Did not play

CUT = missed the half-way cut
"T" = tied for place

== LPGA Tour career summary ==
Year	Tournaments played	Cuts made	Wins	2nds	3rds	Top 10s	Best finish	Earnings ($)	Money list rank	Scoring average	Scoring rank
2005	1	0	0	0	0	0	MC	0	n/a	n/a	n/a
2006	20	11	0	0	0	1	T7	122,704	77	72.81	75
2007	24	18	0	0	0	1	T9	198,889	57	73.60	92
2008	23	10	0	0	0	0	T25	98,756	97	73.43	112
2009	15	10	0	0	0	0	T13	97,085	88	72.51	64
2010	14	11	0	0	0	0	T19	91,253	75	72.51	53
2011	13	8	0	0	0	0	T32	50,993	91	74.03	107
2012	23	19	0	0	0	3	T4	310,599	43	72.09	39
2013	7	3	0	0	0	0	T37	22,743	121	73.00	n/a
2014	12	5	0	0	0	1	T9	67,391	103	71.88	53
2015	11	4	0	0	0	0	T45	19,398	141	73.47	122

- Official as of 22 November 2015

== Team appearances ==
Amateur

- European Girls' Team Championship (representing Sweden): 2000 (winners), 2001
- European Lady Junior's Team Championship (representing Sweden): 2002
- European Ladies' Team Championship (representing Sweden): 2003, 2005
- Espirito Santo Trophy (representing Sweden): 2002, 2004 (winners)
