= 1995 U.S. Women's Open =

Coordinates: 38.788°N 104.851°W

Tournament information
- Dates: July 13–16, 1995
- Location: Colorado Springs, Colorado
- Courses: The Broadmoor, East Course
- Organized by: USGA
- Tour: LPGA Tour

Statistics
- Par: 70
- Length: 6,398 yards (5,850 m)
- Field: 156 players, 76 after cut
- Cut: 148 (+8)
- Prize fund: $1.0 million
- Winner's share: $175,000

Champion
- (Sweden) Annika Sörenstam
- 278 (−2)

Location in the United States
Location in Colorado

The 1995 U.S. Women's Open was the 50th U.S. Women's Open, held July 13–16 at the East Course of Broadmoor Golf Club in Colorado Springs, Colorado.

Annika Sörenstam shot a final round 68 (−2) to win the first of her three U.S. Women's Opens, one stroke ahead of Meg Mallon, the 54-hole leader and 1991 champion. Sörenstam started the final round at even-par 210, five strokes back in a tie for fourth place; the victory was the first of her ten major titles. The event was televised by ESPN and for the first time by NBC Sports.

Weather delays caused both of the first two rounds to be completed on the following day.

The low amateur was Sarah LeBrun Ingram at 294 (+14), who was seven months pregnant. Dawn Coe-Jones, six months pregnant, finished in a tie for seventh.

The 1995 edition was the first million dollar purse at the U.S. Women's Open, double that of 1990. It was only the fourth time the U.S. Women's Open was played in the western U.S. and the first ever in the Mountain Time Zone.

The East Course, at an average elevation of over 6,200 feet (1,890 m) above sea level, hosted the championship again sixteen years later in 2011. Cherry Hills Country Club, south of Denver, hosted in between in 2005.

== Round summaries ==
=== First round ===
Thursday, July 13, 1995
Friday, July 14, 1995

Place	Player	Score	To par
1	(United States) Jill Briles-Hinton	66	−4
T2	(Spain) Tania Abitbol	67	−3
T2	(United States) Jean Bartholomew	67	−3
T2	(United States) Pat Bradley	67	−3
T2	(Sweden) Annika Sörenstam	67	−3
T6	(Canada) Dawn Coe-Jones	68	−2
T6	(United States) Tammie Green	68	−2
T6	(United States) Julie Larsen	68	−2
T6	(United States) Val Skinner	68	−2
T6	(United States) Kris Tschetter	68	−2

=== Second round ===
Friday, July 14, 1995
Saturday, July 15, 1995

Place	Player	Score	To par
T1	(United States) Jean Bartholomew	67-71=138	−2
T1	(United States) Pat Bradley	67-71=138	−2
T1	(United States) Jill Briles-Hinton	66-72=138	−2
T1	(Canada) Dawn Coe-Jones	68-70=138	−2
T1	(United States) Dale Eggeling	70-68=138	−2
T1	(United States) Tammie Green	68-70=138	−2
T1	(United States) Leta Lindley	70-68=138	−2
T1	(Sweden) Annika Sörenstam	67-71=138	−2
T9	(Spain) Tania Abitbol	67-72=139	−1
T9	(United States) Rosie Jones	69-70=139	−1
T9	(United States) Julie Larsen	68-71=139	−1
T9	(United States) Meg Mallon	70-69=139	−1

=== Third round ===
Saturday, July 15, 1995

Place	Player	Score	To par
1	(United States) Meg Mallon	70-69-66=205	−5
2	(United States) Julie Larsen	68-71-68=207	−3
3	(United States) Rosie Jones	69-70-70=209	−1
T4	(United States) Pat Bradley	67-71-72=210	E
T4	(United States) Kelly Robbins	74-68-68=210	E
T4	(Sweden) Annika Sörenstam	67-71-72=210	E
T7	(Spain) Tania Abitbol	67-72-72=211	+1
T7	(United States) Dale Eggeling	70-68-73=211	+1
T7	(United States) Kris Tschetter	68-74-69=211	+1
T10	(United States) Jill Briles-Hinton	66-72-74=212	+2
T10	(Canada) Dawn Coe-Jones	68-70-74=212	+2
T10	(United States) Leta Lindley	70-68-74=212	+2
T10	(United States) Dottie Mochrie	73-70-69=212	+2
T10	(United States) Val Skinner	68-72-72=212	+2
T10	(United States) Mary Beth Zimmerman	72-72-68=212	+2

=== Final round ===
Sunday, July 16, 1995

Place	Player	Score	To par	Money ($)
1	(Sweden) Annika Sörenstam	67-71-72-68=278	−2	175,000
2	(United States) Meg Mallon	70-69-66-74=279	−1	103,500
T3	(United States) Betsy King	72-69-72-67=280	E	56,238
T3	(United States) Pat Bradley	67-71-72-70=280	E	56,238
T5	(United States) Leta Lindley	70-68-74-69=281	+1	35,285
T5	(United States) Rosie Jones	69-70-70-72=281	+1	35,285
T7	(Canada) Dawn Coe-Jones	68-70-74-70=282	+2	28,009
T7	(United States) Julie Piers	68-71-68-75=282	+2	28,009
T7	(United States) Tammie Green	68-70-75-69=282	+2	28,009
T10	(United States) Marianne Morris	73-73-70-67=283	+3	22,190
T10	(United States) Patty Sheehan	70-73-71-69=283	+3	22,190
T10	(United States) Val Skinner	68-72-72-71=283	+3	22,190
