= Hee-kyung Seo =

South Korean professional golfer (born 1986)

Hee-kyung Seo 서희경
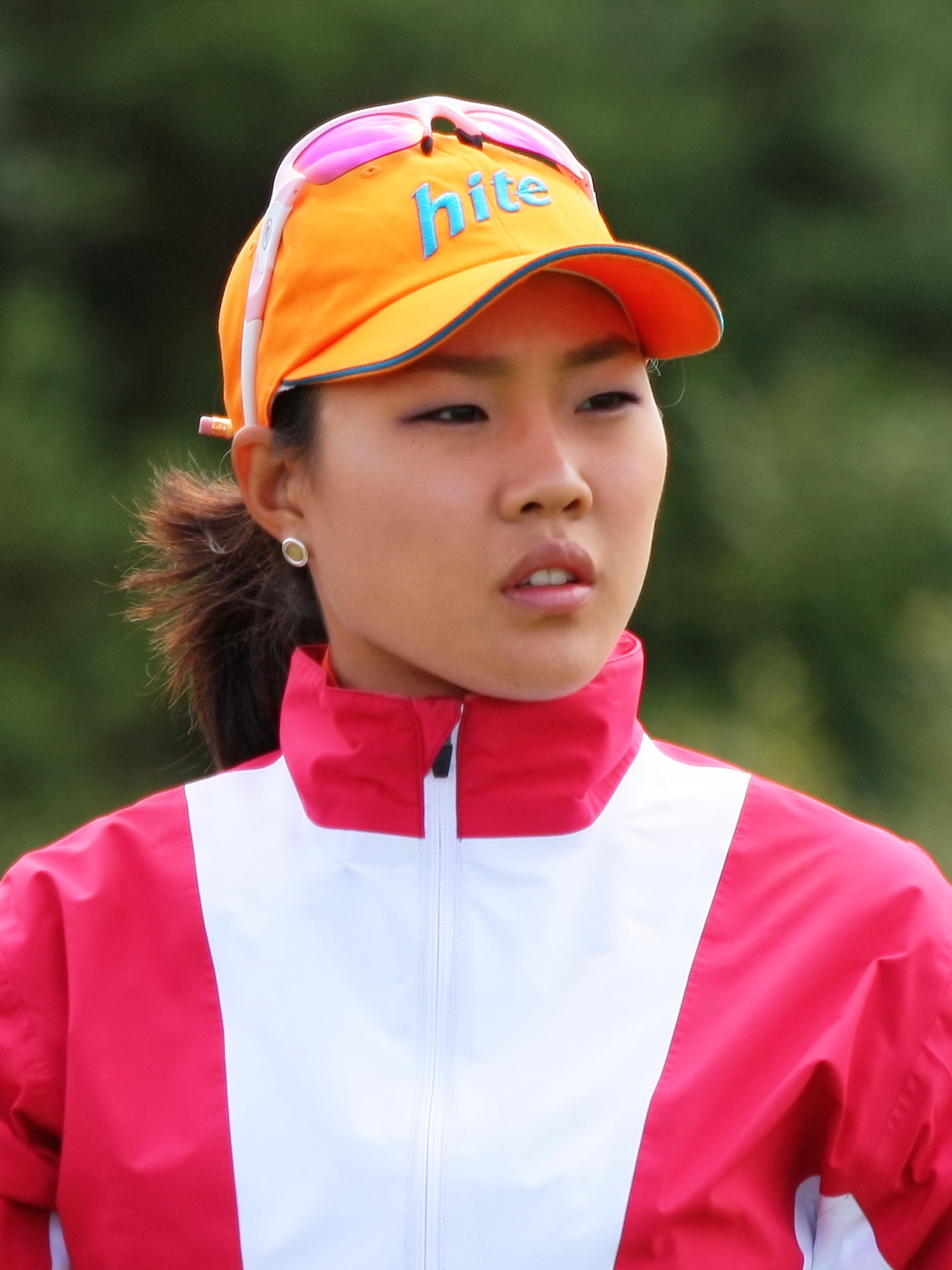
- Seo at the 2010 Women's British Open

Personal information
- Full name: Hee-Kyung Seo
- Nickname: Supermodel of the Fairways
- Nationality: South Korea
- Born: 8 July 1986 (age 40) Yongsan District, Seoul, South Korea
- Height: 1.73 m (5 ft 8 in)
- Spouse: Jung-hyun Kook

Career
- Sport: Golf
- Turned professional: 2006
- Former tours: LPGA Tour; LPGA of Korea Tour
- Professional wins: 12

Number of wins by tour
- LPGA Tour: 1
- Ladies European Tour: 1
- LPGA of Korea Tour: 11

Best results in LPGA major championships
- Chevron Championship: T4: 2012
- Women's PGA C'ship: T34: 2011
- U.S. Women's Open: 2nd: 2011
- Women's British Open: T5: 2010
- Evian Championship: T64: 2013

Achievements and awards
- LPGA of Korea Tour leading money winner: 2009
- LPGA Tour Rookie of the Year: 2011

- Hee-kyung Seo
- Hangul: 서희경
- RR: Seo Huigyeong
- MR: Sŏ Hŭigyŏng

Hee-kyung Seo (Korean: 서희경, born 8 July 1986), also known as Seo Hee-kyung, is a former South Korean female professional golfer who played on the LPGA Tour and on LPGA of Korea Tour. She won the LPGA Tour Rookie of the Year award in 2011.

== Career ==
After winning three LPGA of Korea Tour major championships in 2009, Seo notched her first LPGA Tour triumph at the 2010 Kia Classic where she finished six shots ahead of Inbee Park.

Seo had a close call in the 2011 U.S. Women's Open when she led by two shots with two holes to play, but she missed a 4 footer for par on the 71st hole, while So Yeon Ryu birdied the 72nd hole, resulting in a playoff, which Ryu went on to win.

Seo also came close at the 2012 Kraft Nabisco Championship, where she led by three strokes at one point, but bogeys on the last four holes would result in her finishing two strokes back of winner Sun Young Yoo.

== Personal life ==
On 30 November 2013, she married Junghoon Philip Kook (born 1979), an executive officer at DWS Asset Management based in Seoul, and gave a birth to their first son, on the Independence Day of Korea. Since then, they had two more sons. Seo officially retired from professional golf in November 2015 to spend more time with her family.

== Awards and honors ==
- In 2009, she won the money list for the LPGA of Korea Tour.
- In 2011, she earned LPGA Tour's Rookie of the Year honors.

== Professional wins (12) ==
=== LPGA Tour (1) ===
No.	Date	Tournament	Winning score	Margin of victory	Runner-up
1	28 Mar 2010	Kia Classic	−12 (70-67-69-70=276)	6 strokes	(South Korea) Inbee Park

LPGA Tour playoff record (0–4)

No.	Year	Tournament	Opponent(s)	Result
1	2011	**U.S. Women's Open**	(South Korea) Ryu So-yeon	Lost three hole aggregate playoff: Ryu: 3-4-3=10 (−2), Seo: 3-6-4=13 (+1)
2	2012	Women's Australian Open	(Paraguay) Julieta Granada (United States) Jessica Korda (United States) Stacy Lewis (United States) Brittany Lincicome (South Korea) Ryu So-yeon	Korda won with birdie on second extra hole.
3	2012	Manulife Financial LPGA Classic	(South Korea) Chella Choi (United States) Brittany Lang (South Korea) Inbee Park	Lang won with birdie on third extra hole. Park eliminated by birdie on second hole. Choi eliminated by birdie on first hole.
4	2013	LPGA KEB-HanaBank Championship	(South Korea) Amy Yang	Lost to birdie on first extra hole.

=== KLPGA Tour (11) ===
No.	Date	Tournament	Winning score	Margin of victory	Runner(s)-up
1	30 Aug 2008	High1 Cup SBS Charity Ladies Open	−8 (68-68-72=208)	2 strokes	(South Korea) Inbee Park
2	7 Sep 2008	KB Star Tour 3rd Tournament at Cheongwon	−7 (68-69-72=207)	1 stroke	(South Korea) Ha-neul Kim (South Korea) Hye-youn Kim
3	13 Sep 2008	Binhai Open	−9 (70-66-71=207)	5 strokes	(China) Taoli Yang (England) Danielle Montgomery
4	12 Oct 2008	Gabia-Interburgo Masters	−11 (70-69-69=208)	3 strokes	(South Korea) Ha-neul Kim (South Korea) He-yong Choi (South Korea) Hyun-ji Kim
5	16 Nov 2008	Saint Four Ladies Masters in Jeju^	−14 (69-67-66=202)	2 strokes	(South Korea) Ahn Sun-ju
6	23 Nov 2008	ADT CAPS Championship	−2 (78-72-64=214)	3 strokes	(South Korea) Ae-Ree Pyun (South Korea) Hye-jung Kim
7	17 Apr 2009	MBC Tour Lotte Mart Ladies Open	−6 (71-72-67=210)	1 stroke	(South Korea) Ahn Sun-ju (South Korea) Ilhee Lee
8	3 May 2009	**Taeyoung Cup Korea Women's Open**	−9 (70-71-66=207)	1 stroke	(South Korea) Bo-kyung Kim
9	18 Oct 2009	**Hite Cup Championship**	−9 (72-71-68-68=279)	5 strokes	(South Korea) Choi Na-yeon
10	25 Oct 2009	**KB Star Tour Grand Final at Incheon**	−16 (69-66-68-69=272)	1 stroke	(South Korea) Jang Ha-na (amateur)
11	22 Nov 2009	ADT CAPS Championship	−6 (73-71-66=210)	3 strokes	(South Korea) Jeong-eun Lee

Tournaments in bold denotes major championships on KLPGA Tour.
^ Co-sanctioned with the Ladies European Tour

== Results in LPGA majors ==
Results not in chronological order before 2015.

Tournament	2009	2010	2011	2012	2013	2014	2015
ANA Inspiration		T21	T33	T4	T13	CUT	
Women's PGA Championship			T34	CUT	CUT		T41
U.S. Women's Open	T48	T62	2	T18	T25		
Women's British Open		T5	T22	T26	T25		
The Evian Championship ^					T64		

Top 10
Did not play

CUT = missed the half-way cut
T = tied

=== Summary ===
Tournament	Wins	2nd	3rd	Top-5	Top-10	Top-25	Events	Cuts made
ANA Inspiration	0	0	0	1	1	3	5	4
Women's PGA Championship	0	0	0	0	0	0	4	2
U.S. Women's Open	0	1	0	1	1	3	5	5
Women's British Open	0	0	0	1	1	3	4	4
The Evian Championship	0	0	0	0	0	0	1	1
Totals	0	1	0	3	3	9	19	16

- Most consecutive cuts made – 9 (2009 U.S. Open – 2012 Kraft Nabisco)
- Longest streak of top-10s – 1 (three times)

== LPGA Tour career summary ==
Year	Tournaments played	Cuts made	Wins	2nd	3rd	Top 10s	Best finish	Earnings ($)	Money list rank	Scoring average	Scoring rank
2006	1	1	0	0	0	0	16	17,680	n/a	72.00	n/a
2008	1	1	0	0	0	0	17	19,920	n/a	72.00	n/a
2009	5	4	0	0	0	0	15	73,659	n/a	73.31	n/a
2010	6	6	1	0	0	2	1	369,089	n/a	72.96	n/a
2011	21	18	0	1	0	3	2	619,429	21	71.78	21
2012	25	21	0	2	0	8	T2	600,403	22	71.57	25
2013	22	18	0	1	0	3	2	446,373	33	71.74	38
2014	7	4	0	0	0	0	T29	30,315	128	73.43	n/a
2015	7	5	0	0	0	0	T41	34,050	123	73.64	n/a

- Seo was not a member of the LPGA Tour prior to 2011. Earnings and records for those years are not official.
- official as of the 2015 season
