= Lee Hyeon-ju =

South Korean figure skater

Personal information
- Nationality: South Korean
- Born: 30 July 1953 (age 73) Seoul, South Korea

Sport
- Sport: Figure skating

Lee Hyeon-ju (born 30 July 1953) is a South Korean figure skater. She competed in the ladies' singles event at the 1968 Winter Olympics.

Lee was noted as among the first two Olympic skaters for South Korea.
