= Broadmoor Golf Club =

Golf resort in Colorado, US

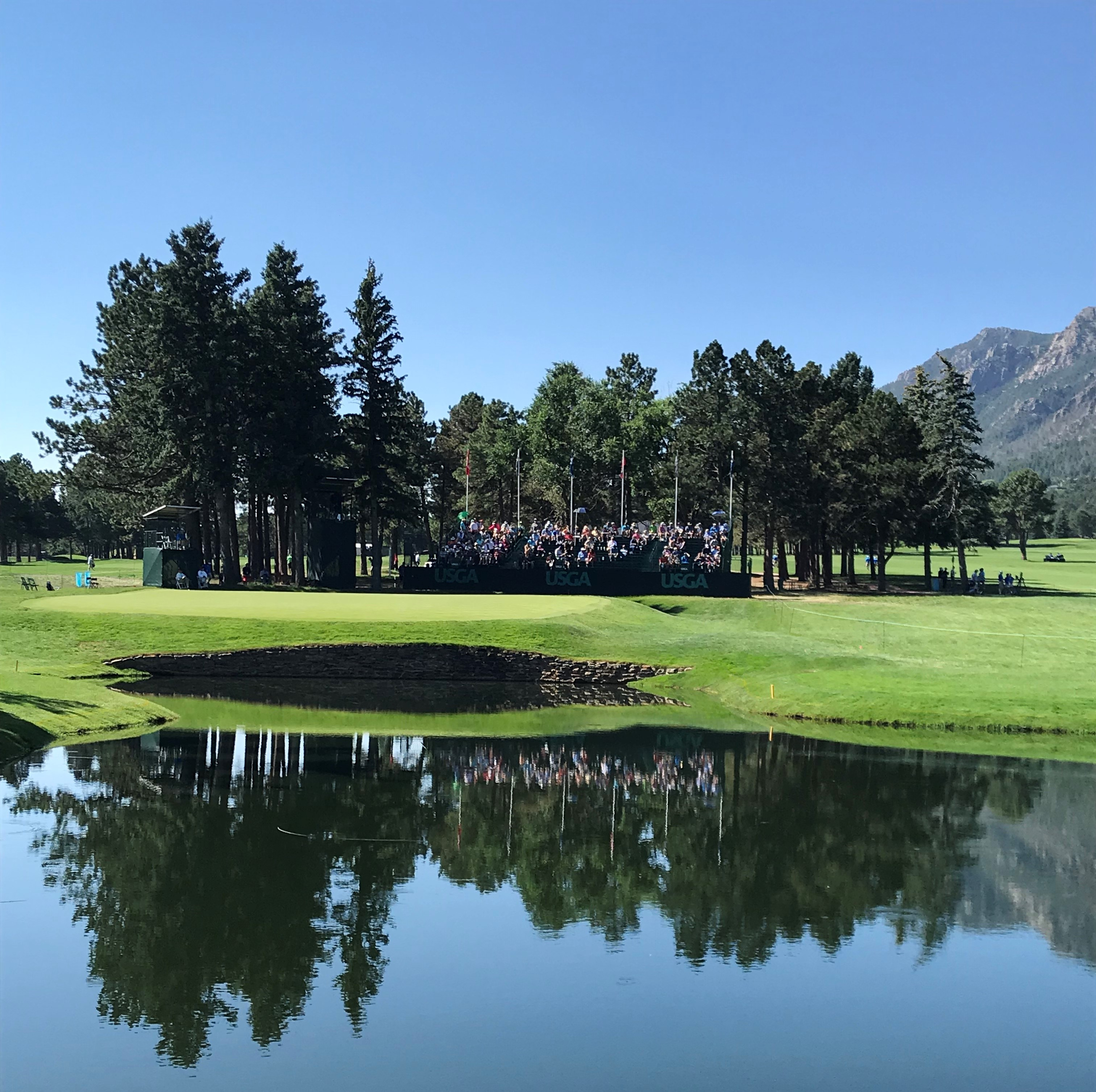
- Hole Number 4 of the Broadmoor Golf Club's East Course, photographed during the 2018 United States Senior Open

- Location within the United States Location within Colorado
- 38.789°N 104.85°W

Club information
- Location: Colorado Springs, Colorado, U.S.
- Elevation: 6,250 feet (1,905 m)
- Established: 1918; 108 years ago
- Type: Resort / Private
- Tota holes: 36
- Tournaments: U.S. Women's Open (1995, 2011); U.S. Senior Open (2008, 2018, 2025); U.S. Amateur (1959, 1967)
- Website: broadmoor.com/activities/golf

East Course
- Designed by: Donald Ross (holes 1-6, 16-18); Robert Trent Jones (holes 7–15)
- Par: 72
- Length: 7,355 yards (6,725 m)
- Course rating: 72.7
- Slope rating: 139

West Course
- Designed by: Donald Ross (holes 1-4, 13-18); Robert Trent Jones (holes 5–12)
- Par: 71
- Length: 7,016 yards (6,415 m)
- Course rating: 71.8
- Slope rating: 134

The Broadmoor Golf Club is a pair of golf courses, located on the grounds of The Broadmoor, a historic hotel and resort in Colorado Springs, Colorado. Originally opened in 1918 and designed by Donald Ross, the course format was expanded in 1965 with 18 additional holes designed by Robert Trent Jones.

The club has hosted several USGA championships since 1959, including the 1995 and 2011 U.S. Women's Open, the 2008, 2018, and 2025 U.S. Senior Open, and the 1959 and 1967 U.S. Amateur.

The current layout consists of the East Course and the West Course, and the club previously had a third 18-hole course, the Mountain Course, which was closed after a 2015 rockslide.

== History ==
The original course opened 108 years ago in 1918 and has hosted several USGA championships since 1959, most recently the U.S. Senior Open in 2025, won by Pádraig Harrington. The East Course previously hosted the U.S. Women's Open in 1995, the first of the ten majors won by Annika Sörenstam.

The current course format (East and West) opened in 1965, featuring new routing and 18 additional holes designed by Robert Trent Jones. The West Course includes the front 9 holes from the original Ross course (now holes 1–4, 13–18 on West). The East Course includes the original back 9 Donald Ross holes (now holes 1–6,16-18 on East).

The South Course opened in 1976 and was designed by Arnold Palmer and Ed Seay. It was closed due to landslide issues. That site was completely remodeled by Chris Cochran of Jack Nicklaus Design in 2006 and renamed the Mountain Course. It closed in 2015 due to a landslide. Nicklaus won his first major tournament, the 1959 U.S. Amateur, at the East Course at the age of 19.

The resort's landmark hotel sits at an elevation of 6,230 feet (1,900 m) above sea level, with the golf courses climbing slightly higher.

== See also ==
- The Broadmoor
