= Haeji Kang =

South Korean professional golfer (born 1990)

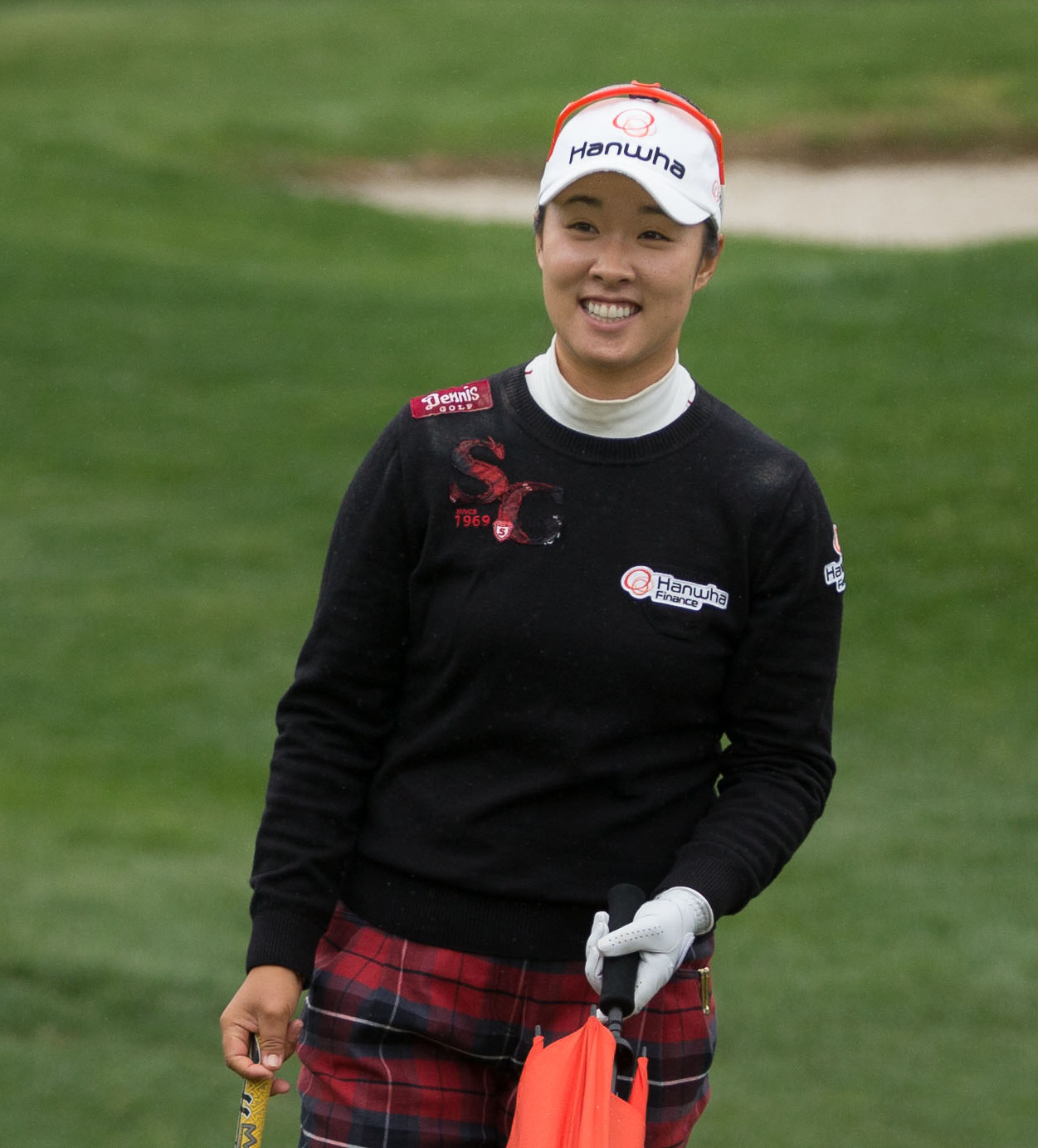

Personal information
- Full name: Haeji Kang
- Nationality: South Korea
- Born: 14 November 1990 (age 35) Seoul, South Korea
- Height: 5 ft 7 in (1.70 m)

Career
- Sport: Golf
- Turned professional: 2007
- Current tour: Epson Tour
- Former tour: LPGA Tour
- Professional wins: 1

Number of wins by tour
- Epson Tour: 1

Best results in LPGA major championships
- Chevron Championship: T5: 2013
- Women's PGA C'ship: T33: 2013
- U.S. Women's Open: T17: 2013
- Women's British Open: T20: 2018
- Evian Championship: T35: 2021

Haeji Kang (born 14 November 1990) is a South Korean female professional golfer who plays on the LPGA Tour.

== Early life and amateur career ==
Kang was born in Seoul, South Korea. As a child, she moved from Korea to New Zealand and then to Australia to pursue a golf career. She had success as a junior and amateur golfer in Australia. She was the leading amateur in the 2006 LG Bing Lee Women's NSW Open. She won the Australian Girls' Championship in 2007 and finishing in second place up at the Senior Amateur. In 2007, she received a sponsor's invitation to play in the ANZ Ladies Masters where she was the low amateur.

== Professional career ==
Kang participated in the Futures Tour qualifying tournament in the fall of 2007, finishing in 12th place. She turned professional after the qualifying tournament and played 2008 on the Futures Tour. In the 2008 season on the Futures Tour she had six top-10 finishes and one win.

Kang participated in the LPGA qualifying tournament in the fall of 2008 and finished in 29th place which gave her conditional status on the LPGA Tour for 2009 and the ability to continue playing on the Futures Tour. She played in 16 tournaments on the LPGA Tour in 2009, earning enough money to secure full playing privileges on the Tour for 2010. Her best finish in her rookie year of 2009 was a T4 at the Wegmans LPGA. In her second year on the LPGA Tour, 2010, she played a full season of events with a top finish of T5 at the Sybase Match Play Championship.

== Professional wins (1) ==
=== Futures Tour wins (1) ===
No.	Date	Tournament	Winning score	To par	Margin of victory	Runner-up	Winner's share (US$)
1	17 Aug 2008	Greater Richmond Duramed Futures Classic	65-72-68=205	−11	Playoff	(Mexico) Sophia Sheridan	14,000

== Results in LPGA majors ==
Results not in chronological order.

Tournament	2009	2010	2011	2012	2013	2014	2015	2016	2017	2018	2019	2020	2021	2022	2023	2024	2025
Chevron Championship		T48	CUT	T15	T5	T51	T51				T52						
U.S. Women's Open	T57		CUT		T17	T59	WD				T55				T53		
Women's PGA Championship	CUT	T34	T72	T51	T33	T40	CUT	CUT	CUT	CUT	T37	T65	CUT	CUT	T36	CUT	CUT
The Evian Championship ^					T44	T54				CUT	T62	NT	T35	T69			T70
Women's British Open	CUT	T31	T30	T47	CUT	CUT				T20	CUT		T29			CUT	CUT

^ The Evian Championship was added as a major in 2013

Top 10
Did not play

CUT = missed the half-way cut
NT = no tournament
T = tied

=== Summary ===
Tournament	Wins	2nd	3rd	Top-5	Top-10	Top-25	Events	Cuts made
Chevron Championship	0	0	0	1	1	2	7	6
U.S. Women's Open	0	0	0	0	0	1	7	5
Women's PGA Championship	0	0	0	0	0	0	17	8
The Evian Championship	0	0	0	0	0	0	7	6
Women's British Open	0	0	0	0	0	1	11	5
Totals	0	0	0	1	1	4	49	30

- Most consecutive cuts made – 7 (2011 British Open – 2013 U.S. Open)
- Longest streak of top-10s – 1

== LPGA Tour career summary ==
Year	Tournaments played	Cuts made	Wins	2nd	3rd	Top 10s	Best finish	Earnings (US$)	Money list rank	Scoring average	Scoring rank
2009	16	10	0	0	0	1	T4	48,048	67	72.37	67
2010	19	13	0	0	0	0	11	55,984	58	72.91	69
2011	16	10	0	0	0	0	T14	81,691	45	73.50	76
2012	24	21	0	0	1	4	T3	456,425	29	71.54	23
2013	25	19	0	0	0	3	T5	408,641	37	71.62	32
2014	26	18	0	0	1	2	T3	333,072	49	72.49	88
2015	19	8	0	0	0	0	T29	44,869	115	73.60	124
2016	14	4	0	0	0	0	T20	38,539	126	72.58	99
2017	9	4	0	0	0	1	T5	87,160	108	70.84	n/a
2018	24	14	0	0	1	2	T3	258,711	70	72.00	83
2019	21	13	0	0	0	0	T27	116,843	104	72.00	100
2020	11	9	0	0	0	0	T28	59,129	101	72.16	75
2021	20	15	0	0	0	1	T6	221,843	78	71.44	73
2022	22	14	0	0	0	2	T4	213,640	92	71.61	85
2023	12	6	0	0	0	0	T22	112,747	126	72.77	137
2024	20	7	0	0	1	1	T3	168,193	106	72.33	119
2025	17	7	0	0	1	1	3	216,252	104	72.77	131

- Official as of 2025 season
