= Korean Ladies Masters =

Women's professional golf tournament

The Korean Ladies Masters was a women's professional golf tournament co-sanctioned by the LPGA of Korea Tour and the Ladies European Tour. It was played from 2008 to 2010.

== Winners ==
Year	Winner	Country	Venue	Score	To par	Margin of victory	Runner(s)-up
Daishin Securities-Tomato M Korea-European Ladies Masters
2010	Kim Hyun-ji	South Korea	Haevichi Country Club	208	−8	1 stroke	(South Korea) Yang Soo-jin (South Korea) Seo Hee-kyung
Daishin Securities Tomato Tour Korean Ladies Masters
2009	Kim Hyun-ji	South Korea	Cypress Country Club	215	−1	Playoff	(South Korea) Ryu So-yeon (South Korea) Sarah Lee
Saint Four Ladies Masters in Jeju
2008	Seo Hee-kyung	South Korea	Saint Four	202	−14	2 strokes	(South Korea) Ahn Sun-ju
