= Shanshan Feng =

Chinese professional golfer (born 1989)

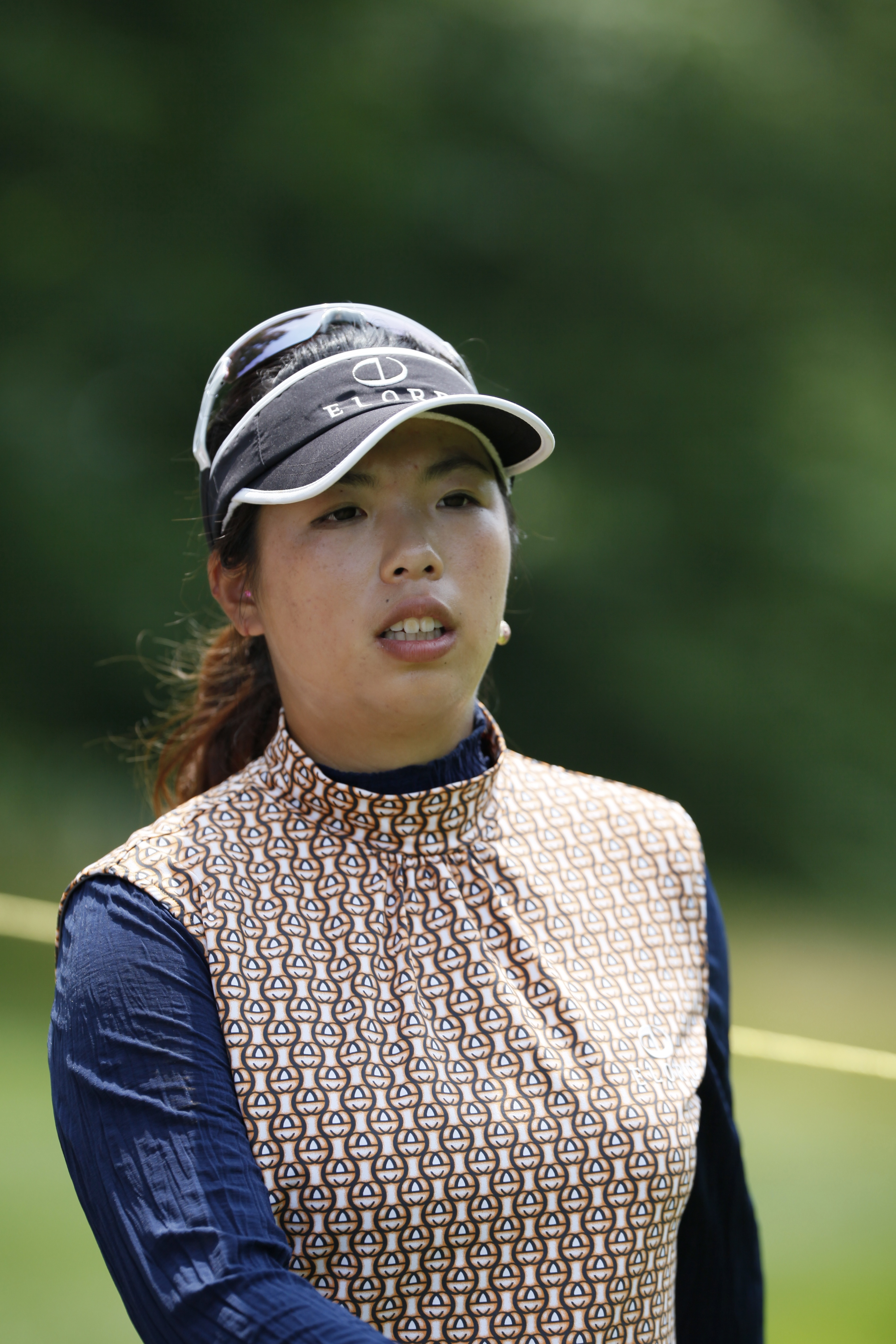
- Feng at the 2009 LPGA Championship.

Personal information
- Nickname: Jenny
- Nationality: China
- Born: 5 August 1989 (age 37) Guangzhou, China
- Height: 5 ft 8 in (1.73 m)

Career
- Sport: Golf
- Turned professional: 2007
- Former tours: LPGA Tour; Ladies European Tour
- Professional wins: 23

Number of wins by tour
- LPGA Tour: 10
- Ladies European Tour: 7
- LPGA of Japan Tour: 7
- Other: 1

Best results in LPGA major championships (wins: 1)
- Chevron Championship: T3: 2021
- Women's PGA C'ship: Won: 2012
- U.S. Women's Open: T4: 2012, 2021
- Women's British Open: T2: 2014
- Evian Championship: T2: 2019

Achievements and awards
- Ladies European Tour Order of Merit: 2015
Medal record
Olympic Games
Bronze medal – third place	2016 Rio de Janeiro	Golf

Shanshan Feng (Chinese: 冯珊珊; pinyin: Féng Shān Shān, Mandarin pronunciation: [fə̌ŋ ʂə́ŋ ʂə́ŋ]; born 5 August 1989) is a Chinese professional golfer. She played on the U.S.-based LPGA Tour. She was the first player from China to become a member of the tour which she joined in 2008.

== Early life ==
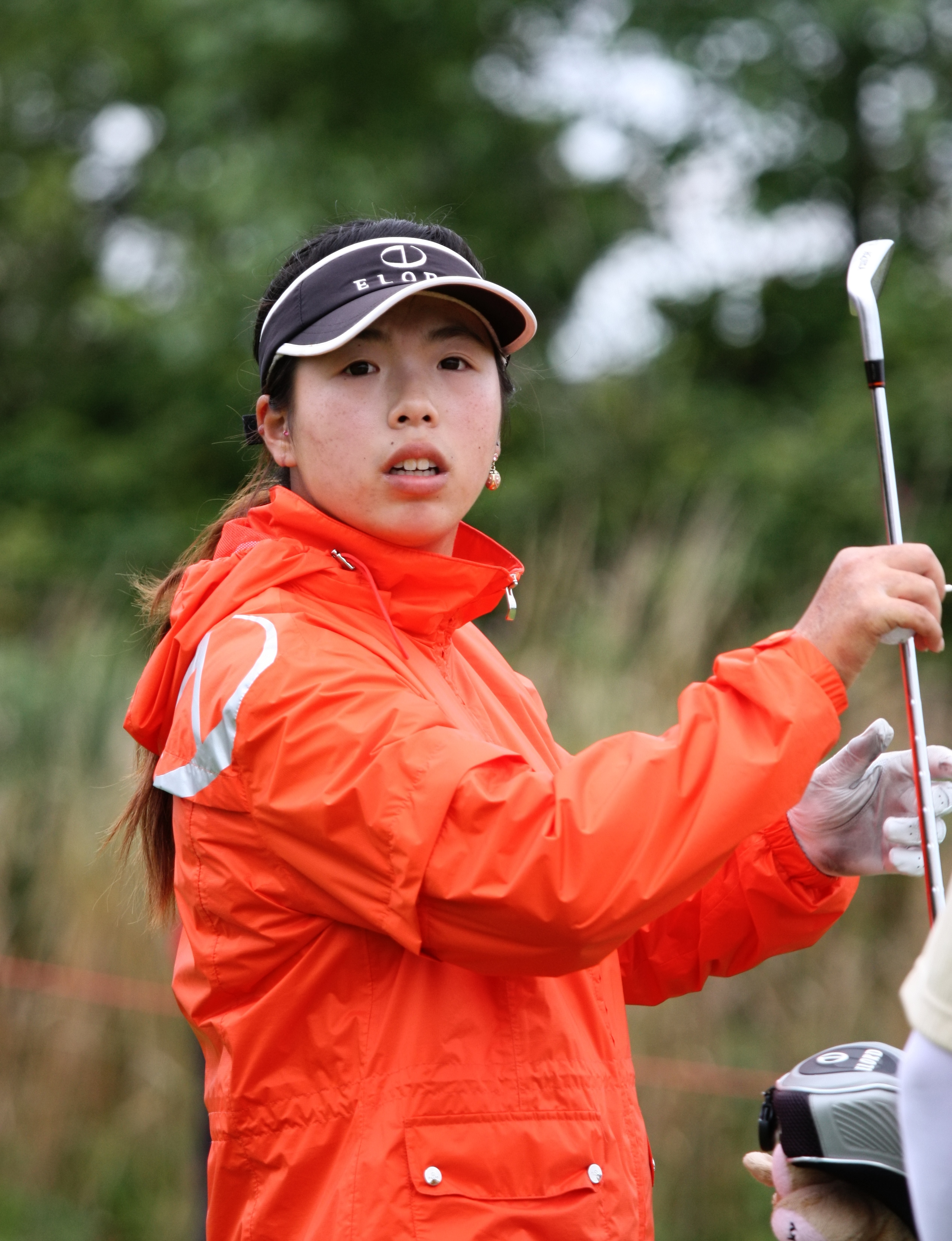
2009 Women's British Open

In 1989, Feng was born in Guangzhou, China, in the province of Guangdong. She started playing golf at the age of 10 at the urging of her father, Feng Xiong, who worked at the golf association in their hometown.

Due to limited resources and a lack of reputable golf coaches, Feng's father, who was the captain of a junior golf team, worked with her every day. During the week, Feng would attend school from 8 a.m. to 5 p.m., and then her father would bring her to the driving range where she would practice for two hours hitting golf balls off a mat. On the weekends, she traveled outside of the city to a local course to play practice rounds and work on her short game. She had some success as a junior. In 2004, Feng won the China Junior Championship and the China Junior Open.

== Amateur career ==
Feng was a winner of the China Amateur three years consecutively: from 2004 through 2006. She was the Champion of the 2006 China Women's Amateur Open. A member of the 2006 All-China Championship Team, she earned a medalist honors at the event.

When Feng was in high school an agent discovered her, at a tournament in China, and this led to her meeting coach Gary Gilchrist. When Feng was 17 years old, Gilchrist offered her a full scholarship to attend his junior golf academy in Hilton Head, South Carolina. Feng accepted the offer and moved to the U.S. hoping to become a professional golfer. In 2007 she was named Golfweeks's Top Chinese Amateur after winning four tournaments on the International Junior Golf Tour (IIGT) in 2007.

Despite the scholarship to Gilchrist's academy, living expenses, tuition at a nearby high school, and traveling costs became heavy financial burdens on her parents, Feng Xiong and Zheng Yuyan, who both work at governmental institutes and earn average salaries. Feng's parents had spent almost all of their savings by the end of 2007, and they considered mortgaging their house to support their daughter. However, the family support paid off in December 2007 when Feng, a teenager amateur, earned a spot on the LPGA Tour's 2008 season after tying for ninth place at the Tour's qualifying tournament.

== Professional career ==
In 2007, Feng turned professional. She had 10 victories on the tour, including the 2012 LPGA Championship, a major title, in which she shot a bogey-free 67 in the final round to win by two strokes. She was the first player from China to win an LPGA major championship, as well as the first player from mainland China (male or female) to have won a major championship. Her best finish in 16 previous majors was a tie for 22nd at the 2012 Kraft Nabisco Championship. With the victory, she moved from tenth to fifth in the Women's World Golf Rankings.

On 20 August 2016, Feng won the Olympic bronze medal in women's golf at the 2016 Olympic Games in Rio de Janeiro. From November 2017 to April 2018, she was first in the Women's World Golf Rankings. In August 2022, Feng announced her retirement from professional golf.

== Awards and honors ==
- In 2015, Feng won the Order of Merit for the Ladies European Tour.
- In 2016, she earned an bronze medal at the 2016 Summer Olympics in Brazil.

== Professional wins (23) ==
=== LPGA Tour wins (10) ===
Legend
Major championships (1)
Other LPGA Tour (9)

No.	Date	Tournament	Winning score	To par	Margin of victory	Runner(s)-up	Winner's share ($)
1	10 Jun 2012	Wegmans LPGA Championship	72-73-70-67=282	−6	2 strokes	(South Korea) Ji Eun-hee (United States) Stacy Lewis (Japan) Mika Miyazato (Norway) Suzann Pettersen	375,000
2	6 Oct 2013	Reignwood LPGA Classic	70-64-64-68=266	−26	1 stroke	(United States) Stacy Lewis	270,000
3	24 Nov 2013	CME Group Titleholders	66-74-67-66=273	−15	1 stroke	(United States) Gerina Piller	700,000
4	12 Oct 2014	Sime Darby LPGA Malaysia	67-67-69-63=266	−18	3 strokes	(Thailand) Pornanong Phatlum	300,000
5	30 Oct 2016	Sime Darby LPGA Malaysia (2)	66-70-64-67=267	−17	3 strokes	(Norway) Suzann Pettersen	270,000
6	6 Nov 2016	Toto Japan Classic^	69-64-70=203	−13	1 stroke	(South Korea) Jang Ha-na	225,000
7	28 May 2017	LPGA Volvik Championship	68-67-66-68=269	−19	1 stroke	(Australia) Minjee Lee (South Korea) Park Sung-hyun	195,000
8	5 Nov 2017	Toto Japan Classic^ (2)	66-63-68=197	−19	2 strokes	(Japan) Ai Suzuki	225,000
9	11 Nov 2017	Blue Bay LPGA	69-67-73-70=279	−9	1 stroke	(Thailand) Moriya Jutanugarn	315,000
10	7 Jul 2019	Thornberry Creek LPGA Classic	64-67-65-63=259	−29	1 stroke	(Thailand) Ariya Jutanugarn	300,000

^ Co-sanctioned with the LPGA of Japan Tour

LPGA Tour playoff record (0–3)

No.	Year	Tournament	Opponent(s)	Result
1	2011	Mizuno Classic	(Japan) Momoko Ueda	Lost to birdie on third extra hole
2	2012	HSBC Women's Champions	(South Korea) Na Yeon Choi (South Korea) Jenny Shin (United States) Angela Stanford	Stanford won with par on third extra hole Choi eliminated by par on second hole Feng eliminated by par on first hole
3	2014	Lorena Ochoa Invitational	(United States) Christina Kim	Lost to par on second extra hole

=== LPGA of Japan Tour wins (7) ===
No.	Date	Tournament	Winning score	To par	Margin of victory	Runner(s)-up	Winner's share (¥)
1	7 Aug 2011	Meiji Cup	68-67-67=202	−13	2 strokes	(South Korea) Jang Eun-bi (Japan) Miho Koga	16,200,000
2	25 Sep 2011	Miyagi TV Cup Dunlop Ladies Open	70-70-68=208	−8	1 stroke	(Japan) Yuri Fudoh	12,600,000
3	27 May 2012	Yonex Ladies	70-69-69=208	−8	Playoff	(Japan) Yukari Baba	10,800,000
4	5 Aug 2012	Meiji Cup	72-70-67=209	−7	Playoff	(South Korea) Ahn Sun-ju (Japan) Shinobu Moromizato	16,200,000
5	30 Sep 2012	Japan Women's Open Golf Championship	68-75-74-71=288	E	1 stroke	(South Korea) Inbee Park	28,000,000
6	6 Nov 2016	Toto Japan Classic^	69-64-70=203	−13	1 stroke	(South Korea) Jang Ha-na	23,175,000
7	5 Nov 2017	Toto Japan Classic^ (2)	66-63-68=197	−19	2 strokes	(Japan) Ai Suzuki	25,510,500

^ Co-sanctioned with the LPGA Tour

=== Ladies European Tour wins (7) ===
No.	Date	Tournament	Winning score	To par	Margin of victory	Runner-up	Winner's share (€)
1	2 Mar 2012	World Ladies Championship individual event	66-69-71=206	−10	1 stroke	(Thailand) Pornanong Phatlum	56,275
2	8 Dec 2012	Omega Dubai Ladies Masters	66-65-67-69=267	−21	5 strokes	(Netherlands) Dewi Claire Schreefel	75,000
3	13 Dec 2014	Omega Dubai Ladies Masters (2)	66-67-66-70=269	−19	5 strokes	(Spain) Carlota Ciganda	75,000
4	10 May 2015	Buick Championship	65-67-69-70=271	−17	6 strokes	(South Korea) Kang Hyeon-seo	82,500
5	12 Dec 2015	Omega Dubai Ladies Masters (3)	67-67-67-66=267	−21	12 strokes	(Thailand) Thidapa Suwannapura	75,000
6	15 May 2016	Buick Championship (2)	71-66-70-67=274	−14	Playoff	(South Korea) Choi Na-yeon	72,324
7	10 Dec 2016	Omega Dubai Ladies Masters (4)	72-70-64=206	−10	2 strokes	(England) Charley Hull	75,000

Ladies European Tour playoff record (1–0)

No.	Year	Tournament	Opponent	Result
1	2016	Buick Championship	(South Korea) Choi Na-yeon	Won with birdie on first extra hole

=== Other wins (1) ===
- 2012 World Ladies Championship (team event with Liying Ye)

== Major championships ==
=== Wins (1) ===
Year	Championship	Winning score	Margin	Runners-up
2012	LPGA Championship	−6 (72-73-70-67=282)	2 strokes	(South Korea) Eun-Hee Ji, (United States) Stacy Lewis, (Japan) Mika Miyazato, (Norway) Suzann Pettersen

=== Results timeline ===
Results not in chronological order.

Tournament	2007	2008	2009	2010	2011	2012
ANA Inspiration			CUT		T55	T22
U.S. Women's Open	CUT	CUT	T48	CUT	T42	T4
Women's PGA Championship		T58	CUT	T54	T50	1
Women's British Open		CUT	T67	T73	T30	CUT

Tournament	2013	2014	2015	2016	2017	2018	2019	2020	2021
ANA Inspiration	T25	6	T8	T50	T21	T25	CUT		T3
U.S. Women's Open	T9	T15	CUT	T38	T5	CUT	CUT		T4
Women's PGA Championship	T9	T6	T13	T17	CUT	T18	CUT		CUT
The Evian Championship^	T11	T10	3	4	T6	T44	T2	NT	
Women's British Open	T25	T2	T24	T17	T7	T7	CUT		

^ The Evian Championship was added as a major in 2013

Win
Top 10
Did not play

CUT = missed the half-way cut
NT = no tournament
"T" = tied

=== Summary ===
Tournament	Wins	2nd	3rd	Top-5	Top-10	Top-25	Events	Cuts made
ANA Inspiration	0	0	1	1	3	7	11	9
U.S. Women's Open	0	0	0	3	4	5	14	8
Women's PGA Championship	1	0	0	1	3	6	13	9
The Evian Championship	0	1	1	3	5	6	7	7
Women's British Open	0	1	0	1	3	6	12	9
Totals	1	2	2	9	18	30	57	42

- Most consecutive cuts made – 12 (2013 Kraft Nabisco – 2015 WPC)
- Longest streak of top-10s – 4 (2014 British – 2015 ANA)

== Olympics medals (1) ==
=== Singles: 1 (1 bronze medal) ===
No.	Date	Tournament	Score	To par	Gold medalist	Silver medalist
1	20 Aug 2016	Summer Olympics, Rio de Janeiro, Brazil	70-67-68-69=273	−10	(South Korea) Inbee Park	(New Zealand) Lydia Ko

== LPGA Tour career summary ==
Year	Tournaments played	Cuts made	Wins	2nd	3rd	Top 10s	Best finish	Earnings ($)	Money list rank	Scoring average	Scoring rank
2007	1	0	0	0	0	0	MC	0	n/a	75.50	n/a
2008	26	16	0	1	0	4	2	472,758	36	72.45	57
2009	21	12	0	0	0	0	T20	123,694	75	72.60	69
2010	17	15	0	0	0	4	T4	281,303	38	71.69	26
2011	17	15	0	1	0	4	2	362,097	32	71.22	20
2012	19	18	1	1	1	8	1	1,101,147	10	70.84	8
2013	19	18	2	2	0	10	1	1,716,657	4	70.37	6
2014	24	24	1	2	1	12	1	1,404,623	6	70.37	7
2015	21	20	0	1	2	12	T2	1,086,338	9	70.44	9
2016	21	20	2	1	1	11	1	1,458,579	5	69.88	4
2017	22	20	3	1	2	12	1	1,728,191	4	69.78	8
2018	22	21	0	0	3	6	T3	738,823	27	70.42	18
2019	23	17	1	1	0	6	1	986,190	16	70.23	16
2020	Did not play										
2021	8	7	0	0	1	3	T3	520,964	40	70.81	n/a
Totals	261	223	10	11	11	92	1	11,981,365	13		

- official through 2021 season

== World ranking ==
Position in Women's World Golf Rankings at the end of each calendar year.

Year	World ranking	Source
2006	609	
2007	534	
2008	48	
2009	83	
2010	79	
2011	13	
2012	5	
2013	4	
2014	5	
2015	6	
2016	4	
2017	1	
2018	11	
2019	23	
2020	31	
2021	23	

== Team appearances ==
Amateur

- Espirito Santo Trophy (representing China): 2004

Professional

- International Crown (representing China): 2016

== See also ==
- List of golfers with most LPGA major championship wins
- List of golfers with most LPGA Tour wins
