= Sharmila Nicollet =

Indian professional golfer (born 1991)

Personal information
- Nicknames: Cherie, Nico, Shamz
- Nationality: India
- Born: 12 March 1991 (age 35) Bangalore, India
- Height: 1.81 m (5 ft 11 in)

Career
- Sport: Golf
- Turned professional: 2009
- Current tours: Women's Golf Association of India; Ladies European Tour
- Professional wins: 11

Achievements and awards
- Lady golfer of the year (IGULS): 2007
- Player of the Year (WGAI): 2010

Sharmila Nicollet (born 12 March 1991) is an Indian professional golfer. She is from Bangalore, India.

== Early life ==
In 1991, Nicollet was born in Bangalore, India. Her father Marc Nicollet is French and her mother Surekha Nicollet is from Bangalore. Surekha is a perfumist and has her own Padmini Aroma Ltd in Bangalore while Marc is a software professional.

Nicollet did her schooling in Bishop Cotton Girls' School and Bangalore International School finishing her 10th grade and 12th grade privately. She is now pursuing a degree privately as well.

Nicollet pursued golf in 2002 at the age of 11. She won her first tournament at the age of 15. She is a former national sub-junior swimming champ with over 72 gold and silver medals won in state and national aquatic meets (1997 to 2001). She was a state level athlete as well, making records at Bishop Cotton Girls School where she studied.

== Amateur career ==
Nicollet has represented India at the Asian Games at Doha 2006 and in Asia Pacific Junior Golf Tournament, played at the Callaway Junior World Golf Championships in San Diego, the Queen Sirikit Cup at Japan, the Malaysian Open and other international tournaments.

Nicollet was also the youngest lady golfer to win the All-India Ladies Amateur Championship in 2007–2008, along with seven Open Amateur Tournaments.

Nicollet partnered with England's Laura Davies as a 16-year-old amateur during a special Emaar – MGF Challenge Match ahead of the 2007 Ladies European Tour event that was held in India. Davies commented that, "from my experience, Sharmila has all the potential to be a good player." Her present coach Tarun Sardesai, and past coach Gaurav Diwan from KGA feel that she has the talent to achieve great things because of her natural aptitude for the game.

== Professional career ==
In 2009, Nicollet turned professional when she was 18 years old. She is the second Indian to earn a full card on the Ladies European Tour.

Nicollet won the 2009–2010 Order of Merit on the Women's Golf Association of India and then five further events to finish on top of the 2010–2011 Order of Merit. She finished the top Indian golfer at T22, at the 2011 Hero Honda Women's Indian Open, with the lowest score of the day in the final round. She has a total of 11 wins on the Women's Golf Association of India.

She finally qualified with a full tour card for the Ladies European Tour in 2012, being the youngest Indian golfer to qualify.

Nicollet was the champion of the Hero-KGA tournament in 2012, and the Hero-WPGT in 2015.

== Personal life ==
Nicollet is dating American track and field sprinter Kenny Bednarek.
