= Sybase Match Play Championship =

Golf tournament formerly on the LPGA Tour

Coordinates: 40.710°N 74.685°W

Tournament information
- Location: Gladstone, New Jersey, U.S.
- Established: 2010
- Course: Hamilton Farm Golf Club
- Par: 72
- Length: 6,585 yards (6,021 m)
- Tour: LPGA Tour
- Format: Match play - 6 rounds
- Prize fund: $1,500,000
- Month played: May
- Final year: 2012

Tournament record score
- Score: 3&1 Sun Young Yoo (2010)

Final champion
- (Spain) Azahara Muñoz

The Sybase Match Play Championship was a women's professional golf tournament for three seasons on the LPGA Tour, held at Hamilton Farm Golf Club in Gladstone, New Jersey. First played in 2010, it was the only match play format event on the LPGA Tour schedule. The previous match play tournament was the HSBC Women's World Match Play Championship, played from 2005 to 2007, with all three events at Hamilton Farm.

The title sponsor was Sybase, an enterprise software and services company headquartered in Dublin, California. It previously sponsored the Sybase Classic, a stroke play event on the LPGA Tour also held in the New York-New Jersey area through 2009. Sybase was acquired by SAP in 2010, which elected not to continue as title sponsor in 2013.

Azahara Muñoz won her first title on the LPGA Tour at the final edition in 2012.

== Selection process ==
The 64-player field for the 2012 event was selected as follows:

- Top 48 players from Category 1 on the 2012 LPGA Priority List (2011 final money list plus medical exemptions)
- Two (2) sponsor invites
- Top two (2) finishers, not otherwise qualified, after the 2nd round of the Mobile Bay LPGA Classic (April 26-27)
- Top twelve (12) players from the 2012 LPGA Official Money List at the conclusion of the Mobile Bay LPGA Classic (April 29), not otherwise qualified

== Schedule ==
A six-round event scheduled over four days, one round each was played on Thursday and Friday to reduce the field from 64 to 16 for Saturday. Two rounds were scheduled for each day on the weekend, with morning and afternoon sessions.

== 2012 course layout ==
Hamilton Farm Golf Club

Hole	1	2	3	4	5	6	7	8	9	Out	10	11	12	13	14	15	16	17	18	In	Total
Yards	381	507	109	377	501	384	421	170	396	3,327	326	568	178	382	409	401	155	324	515	3,258	6,585
Par	4	5	3	4	5	4	4	3	4	36	4	5	3	4	4	4	3	4	5	36	72

(Reflects the layout for the LPGA event; the nines are switched for HFGC members.)

== Winners ==
Year	Dates	Champion	Score	Runner-up	Tournament location	Purse ($)	Winner's share ($)
2012	May 17–20	(Spain) Azahara Muñoz	2&1	(United States) Candie Kung	Hamilton Farm Golf Club	1,500,000	375,000
2011	May 19–22	(Norway) Suzann Pettersen	1 up	(United States) Cristie Kerr	Hamilton Farm Golf Club	1,500,000	375,000
2010	May 20–23	(South Korea) Sun Young Yoo	3&1	(United States) Angela Stanford	Hamilton Farm Golf Club	1,500,000	375,000

== Prize money breakdown ==
Place	Record	Description	US ($)
1	6–0	Champion	375,000
2	5–1	Runner-up	225,000
3	5–1	Third place	150,000
4	4–2	Fourth place	112,500
T5	3–1	Losing quarter-finalists x 4	37,500
T9	2–1	Losing third round x 8	18,750
T17	1–1	Losing second round x 16	7,740
T33	0–1	Losing first round x 32	3,865
Total			1,500,000
