= Yoo Sun-young =

South Korean professional golfer (born 1986)

Yoo Sun-young 유선영
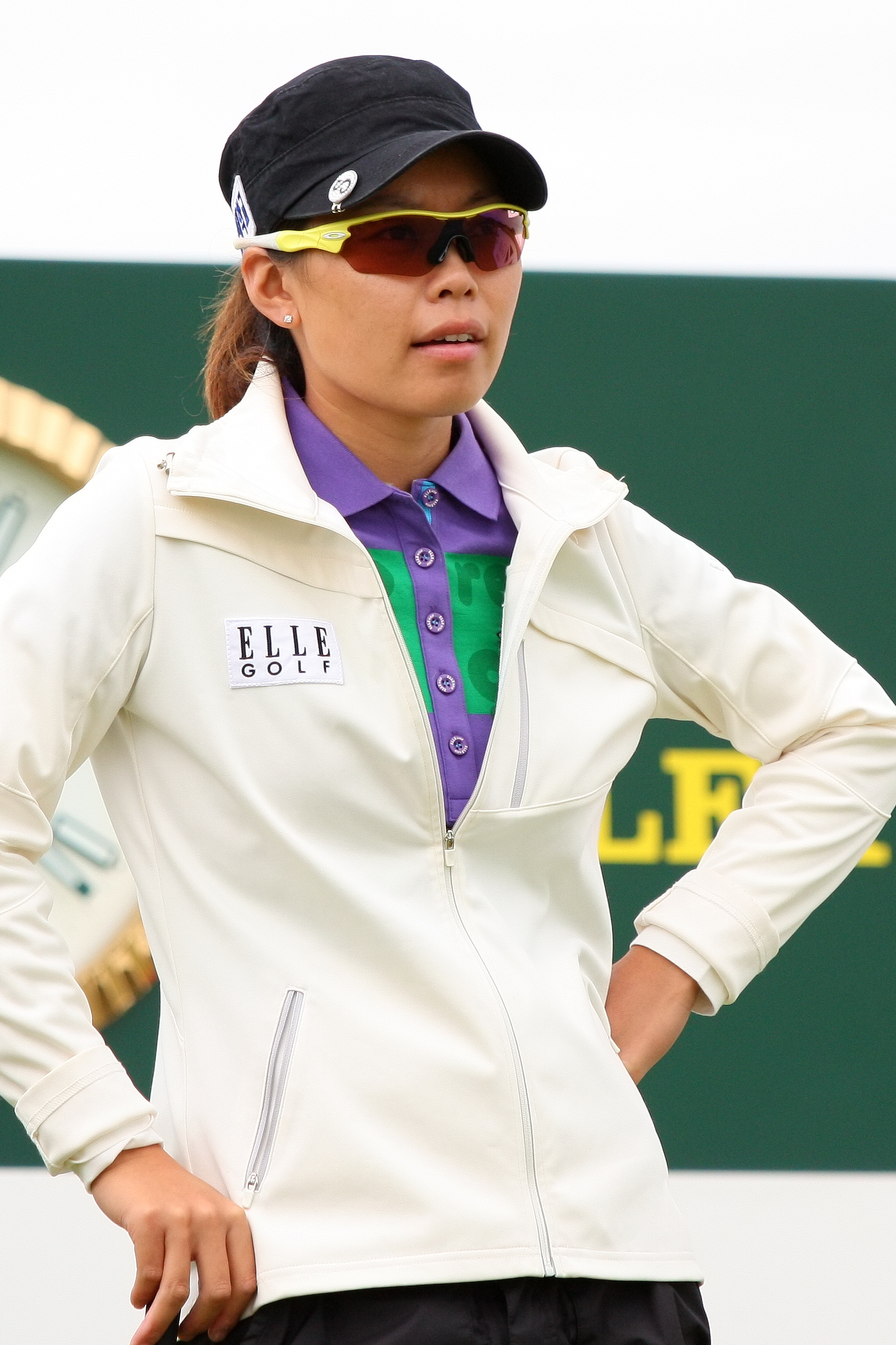
- Yoo at the 2013 Women's British Open

Personal information
- Full name: Yoo Sun-young
- Nickname: Course Clown
- Nationality: South Korea
- Born: 13 December 1986 (age 39) Seoul, South Korea

Career
- Sport: Golf
- Turned professional: 2004
- Former tours: LPGA Tour (2006–2018); Futures Tour (2005)
- Professional wins: 3

Number of wins by tour
- LPGA Tour: 2
- Epson Tour: 1

Best results in LPGA major championships (wins: 1)
- Chevron Championship: Won: 2012
- Women's PGA C'ship: T5: 2013
- U.S. Women's Open: T25: 2011
- Women's British Open: T7: 2011
- Evian Championship: T29: 2015

Achievements and awards
- Futures Tour Rookie of the Year: 2005

Yoo Sun-young (Korean 유선영 Yu Seon-Yeong [ju sʌnjʌŋ]; born 13 December 1986), also known as Sun Young Yoo, is a South Korean female professional golfer who played on the LPGA Tour. She won the 2012 Kraft Nabisco Championship, which was her only major championship.

== Amateur career ==
Yoo had a distinguished amateur career. In 2001, she won the Korean Junior Golf Championship. She played on the Korean National Golf team in both 2002 and 2004. In 2004 Yoo won the Korean Amateur in addition to being a quarter-finalist at the U.S. Women's Amateur.

== Professional career ==
Yoo turned professional in November 2004 and began playing the Futures Tour in 2005. Yoo won her first professional event, the Betty Puskar Golf Classic. That and ten top ten finishes in 18 events allowed Yoo to begin playing the LPGA Tour in 2006.

In September 2009 Yoo had her best ever finish on the LPGA Tour. At the end of 54 holes at the P&G Beauty NW Arkansas Championship, she was tied for first with Jiyai Shin and Angela Stanford. A sudden death playoff followed which was won on the second extra hole by Shin.

Yoo won her first LPGA Tour title at the 2010 Sybase Match Play Championship where she again faced Jiyai Shin and Angela Stanford on the way to the title. She defeated world number one Shin, in a semifinal match 2&1 and went on to defeat Stanford 3&1 in the championship match.

On 1 April 2012, Yoo won her first major title, the Kraft Nabisco Championship. I.K. Kim had a one-foot putt on the final hole for the win but missed it, resulted in a tie with Yoo and a sudden death playoff. On the first hole of the playoff, Yoo won with a 20-foot birdie putt.

Among her fellow South Koreans on the LPGA Tour, Yoo is known as 'Course Clown'.

== Professional wins (3) ==
=== LPGA Tour wins (2) ===
Legend
Major championships (1)
Other LPGA Tour (1)

No.	Date	Tournament	Winning score	To par	Margin of victory	Runner-up	Winner's share ($)
1	23 May 2010	Sybase Match Play Championship	3 and 1			(United States) Angela Stanford	375,000
2	1 Apr 2012	Kraft Nabisco Championship	69-69-72-69=275	−9	Playoff	(South Korea) I.K. Kim	300,000

LPGA Tour playoff record (1–2)

No.	Year	Tournament	Opponent(s)	Result
1	2009	P&G Beauty NW Arkansas Championship	(South Korea) Jiyai Shin (United States) Angela Stanford	Shin won with birdie on second extra hole
2	2012	Kraft Nabisco Championship	(South Korea) I.K. Kim	Won with birdie on first extra hole
3	2015	Pure Silk-Bahamas LPGA Classic	(Thailand) Ariya Jutanugarn (South Korea) Kim Sei-young	Kim won with birdie on first extra hole

=== Futures Tour wins (1) ===
No.	Date	Tournament	Winning score	To par	Margin of victory	Runner-up	Winner's share ($)
1	14 Aug 2005	Betty Puskar Golf Classic	67-69-68=204	−12	2 strokes	(United States) Brandi Jackson	9,800

== Major championships ==
=== Wins (1) ===
Year	Championship	Winning score	Margin	Runner-up
2012	Kraft Nabisco Championship	−9 (69-69-72-69=275)	Playoff^{1}	(South Korea) I.K. Kim

^{1} Defeated I.K. Kim in a sudden death playoff with birdie on first extra hole

=== Results timeline ===
Results not in chronological order before 2018.

Tournament	2006	2007	2008	2009	2010	2011	2012	2013	2014	2015	2016	2017	2018
ANA Inspiration		CUT		T12	CUT	T62	1	CUT	T55	CUT	T18	T35	T16
U.S. Women's Open		CUT	CUT	33	CUT	T25	T32	CUT	CUT	CUT	CUT		CUT
Women's PGA Championship	CUT	WD	T77	T49	T25	T20	T15	T5	CUT	CUT	CUT	CUT	CUT
Women's British Open	T36	CUT	T46	T33	T31	T7	T47	T25	CUT	T24	CUT	T39	
The Evian Championship ^								CUT	T36	T29	CUT	T64	

^ The Evian Championship was added as a major in 2013

Win
Top 10
Did not play

CUT = missed the half-way cut
WD = withdrew
T = tied

=== Summary ===
Tournament	Wins	2nd	3rd	Top-5	Top-10	Top-25	Events	Cuts made
ANA Inspiration	1	0	0	1	1	4	11	7
U.S. Women's Open	0	0	0	0	0	1	11	3
Women's PGA Championship	0	0	0	1	1	4	13	6
Women's British Open	0	0	0	0	1	3	12	9
The Evian Championship	0	0	0	0	0	0	5	3
Totals	1	0	0	2	3	12	52	28

- Most consecutive cuts made – 9 (2010 British Open – 2012 British Open)
- Longest streak of top-10s – 2 (2011 British Open – 2012 Kraft Nabisco)

== LPGA Tour career summary ==
Year	Tournaments played	Cuts made*	Wins	2nd	3rd	Top 10s	Best finish	Earnings ($)	Money list rank	Scoring average	Scoring rank
2006	27	18	0	0	0	2	T5	231,473	57	72.53	64
2007	22	17	0	0	0	0	17	131,092	75	73.06	61
2008	30	25	0	0	1	6	3	688,983	25	71.62	20
2009	25	23	0	1	3	4	T2	614,874	23	71.16	16
2010	22	18	1	0	0	3	1	655,832	16	71.77	27
2011	21	16	0	0	0	6	4	476,672	25	72.04	29
2012	23	22	1	1	0	4	1	781,587	17	71.66	28
2013	25	20	0	0	0	4	T5	383,748	39	71.50	28
2014	26	18	0	0	0	1	T8	261,351	61	72.06	58
2015	25	15	0	1	0	2	T2	340,324	53	71.99	55
2016	21	9	0	0	0	1	T8	125,421	91	72.54	92
2017	22	17	0	0	0	2	T6	235,898	72	71.69	68
2018	15	7	0	0	0	1	T7	85,100	107	72.32	104

- official as of 2018 season

*Includes matchplay and other events without a cut.

== Futures Tour summary ==
Year	Tournaments played	Cuts made	Wins	Top 10s	Best finish	Earnings ($)	Money list rank	Scoring average	Scoring rank
2005	18	18	1	10	1	42,007	5	71.42	6

== Team appearances ==
Amateur

- Espirito Santo Trophy (representing South Korea): 2004
