= 2017 ANA Inspiration =

Coordinates: 33.798°N 116.433°W

Tournament information
- Dates: March 30 – April 2, 2017
- Location: Rancho Mirage, California
- Courses: Mission Hills Country Club; Dinah Shore Tournament Course
- Tour: LPGA Tour
- Format: Stroke play - 72 holes

Statistics
- Par: 72
- Length: 6,769 yards (6,190 m)
- Field: 107 players, 72 after cut
- Cut: 146 (+2)
- Prize fund: $2.7 million
- Winner's share: $405,000

Champion
- (South Korea) Ryu So-yeon
- 274 (−14), playoff

Location in the United States
Location in California

The 2017 ANA Inspiration was a professional women's golf tournament played March 30 – April 2 at the Dinah Shore Tournament Course at Mission Hills Country Club in Rancho Mirage, California. It was the 46th edition of the tournament, and its 35th as one of the Women's majors.

Ryu So-yeon sank a birdie putt on the first hole of a sudden-death playoff to win her second major title. Ryu and Lexi Thompson ended the final round tied for the lead at 274 (−14). Thompson had been assessed a controversial four-stroke penalty on her third round score due to a rules infraction first reported to the LPGA by a television viewer on Sunday. At the time of notification, Thompson was leading at 16-under with six holes remaining, and her score became 12-under, two strokes behind.

== Field ==
Players that qualified for the event are listed below. Players are listed under the first category in which they qualified; additional qualifying categories are shown in parentheses.

1. Active LPGA Tour Hall of Fame members (must have participated in ten official LPGA Tour tournaments within the 12 months prior to the commitment deadline)
Juli Inkster (2), Karrie Webb (2,5,7,8)

- Pak Se-ri did not play

2. Winners of all previous ANA Inspirations
Lydia Ko (4,5,6,7,8,9), Stacy Lewis (3,5,6,7,8,9), Brittany Lincicome (5,8), Inbee Park (3,5,6,8,9), Morgan Pressel (8), Lexi Thompson (5,6,8,9), Yani Tseng, Yoo Sun-young (6)

3. Winners of the U.S. Women's Open, Women's PGA Championship, and Ricoh Women's British Open in the previous five years
Choi Na-yeon (5,6,8), Chun In-gee (4,6,7,8,9,12), Shanshan Feng (5,7,8,9), Brooke Henderson (5,6,7,8,9), Ariya Jutanugarn (6,7,8,9), Brittany Lang (7,8,9), Mo Martin (6,7,8,9), Michelle Wie (5)

- Jiyai Shin (9,10) did not play

4. Winners of The Evian Championship in the previous four years
Kim Hyo-joo (5,6,8,9), Suzann Pettersen (5,6,8,9)

5. Winners of official LPGA Tour tournaments from the 2014 Kraft Nabisco Championship through the week immediately preceding the 2017 ANA Inspiration
Baek Kyu-jung, Chella Choi (8), Carlota Ciganda (8,9), Paula Creamer (8), Austin Ernst (8), M. J. Hur (6,8), Jang Ha-na (7,8,9), Cristie Kerr (8), Christina Kim (8), In-Kyung Kim (8,9), Kim Sei-young (7,8,9), Jessica Korda (8,9), Lee Mi-hyang (8), Minjee Lee (8,9), Mirim Lee (7,8,9), Caroline Masson (6,8), Haru Nomura (8,9), Anna Nordqvist (7,8,9), Lee-Anne Pace (6,8), Ryu So-yeon (6,7,8,9), Lizette Salas (8), Jenny Shin (8), Kris Tamulis (8), Amy Yang (6,7,8,9)

- Ahn Sun-ju (9) did not play

6. All players who finished in the top-20 in the previous year's ANA Inspiration
Jodi Ewart Shadoff (8), Charley Hull (8,9), Lee Bo-mee (9,10), Pernilla Lindberg (8), Ai Miyazato (8), Park Sung-hyun (7,9,10), Gerina Piller (8,9), Paula Reto (8)

7. All players who finished in the top-5 of the previous year's U.S. Women's Open, Women's PGA Championship, Ricoh Women's British Open and The Evian Championship
Ji Eun-hee (8), Catriona Matthew (8), Park Hee-young (8)

8. Top-80 on the previous year's season-ending LPGA Tour official money list
Marina Alex, Katie Burnett, Jacqui Concolino, Simin Feng, Sandra Gal, Karine Icher, Moriya Jutanugarn, Danielle Kang, Kim Kaufman, Megan Khang, Candie Kung, Alison Lee, Lin Xiyu, Gaby López, Lee Lopez, Mika Miyazato, Azahara Muñoz, Su-Hyun Oh, Ryann O'Toole, Pornanong Phatlum, Beatriz Recari, Alena Sharp, Kelly Shon, Sarah Jane Smith, Jennifer Song, Nontaya Srisawang, Angela Stanford, Ayako Uehara, Mariajo Uribe, Jing Yan, Sakura Yokomine

- Sydnee Michaels did not play

9. Top-30 on the Women's World Golf Rankings as of a March 7, 2017

- Teresa Lu did not play

10. Top-2 players from the previous year's season-ending Ladies European Tour Order of Merit, LPGA of Japan Tour money list and LPGA of Korea Tour money list
Beth Allen, Aditi Ashok, Ko Jin-young

11. Top-20 players plus ties on the current year LPGA Tour official money list at the end of the last official tournament prior to the current ANA Inspiration, not otherwise qualified above, provided such players are within the top-80 positions on the current year LPGA Tour official money list at the beginning of the tournament competition
Laetitia Beck, Pei-Yun Chien, Laura Gonzalez Escallon, Caroline Hedwall, Nelly Korda, Maude-Aimee Leblanc, Lee Jeong-eun, Katherine Perry, Melissa Reid, Marissa Steen, Jackie Stoelting, Angel Yin

12. Previous year's Louise Suggs Rolex Rookie of the Year

13. Previous year's U.S. Women's Amateur champion, provided she is still an amateur at the beginning of tournament competition
Seong Eun-jeong

14. Any LPGA Member who did not compete in the previous year's ANA Inspiration major due to injury, illness or maternity, who subsequently received a medical/maternity extension of membership from the LPGA in the previous calendar year, provided they were otherwise qualified to compete in the previous year's ANA Inspiration

15. Up to six sponsor invitations for top-ranked amateur players
Katelyn Dambaugh, Andrea Lee, Lucy Li, Hannah O'Sullivan, Paphangkorn Tavatanakit

== Round summaries ==
=== First round ===
Thursday, March 30, 2017
Friday, March 31, 2017

Due to high winds, play was suspended at 3:16 pm PDT; it resumed on Friday at 9:11 am and the round concluded at 12:24 pm PDT.

Place	Player	Score	To par
T1	(France) Karine Icher	67	−5
T1	(United States) Cristie Kerr	67	−5
T1	(Germany) Caroline Masson	67	−5
T4	(England) Charley Hull	68	−4
T4	(South Korea) Park Sung-hyun	68	−4
T4	(Norway) Suzann Pettersen	68	−4
T4	(South Korea) Ryu So-yeon	68	−4
T4	(South Korea) Eun Jeong Seong (a)	68	−4
T4	(United States) Michelle Wie	68	−4
T10	(United States) Nelly Korda	69	−3
T10	(South Korea) Inbee Park	69	−3
T10	(South Korea) Jenny Shin	69	−3
T10	(United States) Lexi Thompson	69	−3

=== Second round ===
Friday, March 31, 2017
Saturday, April 1, 2017

Place	Player	Score	To par
1	(United States) Lexi Thompson	69-67=136	−8
T2	(South Korea) Park Sung-hyun	68-69=137	−7
T2	(Norway) Suzann Pettersen	68-69=137	−7
T2	(South Korea) Ryu So-yeon	68-69=137	−7
T2	(United States) Michelle Wie	68-69=137	−7
T6	(South Korea) Jang Ha-na	70-68=138	−6
T6	(United States) Cristie Kerr	67-71=138	−6
T6	(United States) Nelly Korda	69-69=138	−6
T6	(Australia) Minjee Lee	70-68=138	−6
T6	(South Korea) Inbee Park	69-69=138	−6

=== Third round ===
Saturday, April 1, 2017

With six holes remaining in the final round on Sunday, Thompson was notified by officials that she had been retroactively issued two penalties on her third round score. The first was a two-stroke penalty for incorrectly placing a marked ball on the 17th green, and the second for subsequently signing an incorrect scorecard, also two strokes, raising her 54-hole score from 203 (−13) to 207 (−9). The review was prompted by a report from a television viewer via the LPGA website on Sunday. The ruling was widely criticized for having allowed the outcome of the major championship to be affected by a "called-in" infraction, and the infraction itself being having moved the ball less than an inch away from the mark.

Several weeks later on April 25, the USGA and The R&A issued Decision 34-3/10, which was effective immediately. It limits the use of video evidence if the infraction "can't be seen with the naked eye", or the player had done "all that can be reasonably expected to make an accurate estimation or measurement" in order to correctly play or spot their ball, even if video evidence suggests otherwise. Although the sanctioning bodies stated that this was part of an effort to update and modernize the Rules of Golf, media outlets considered the ruling to be a response to this incident (as well as a separate incident from the U.S. Women's Open in 2016), going as far as nicknaming it the "Lexi Thompson rule."

Place	Player	Score	To par
1	(Norway) Suzann Pettersen	68-69-68=205	−11
T2	(South Korea) M. J. Hur	70-71-65=206	−10
T2	(Australia) Minjee Lee	70-68-68=206	−10
T2	(South Korea) Inbee Park	69-69-68=206	−10
T2	(South Korea) Ryu So-yeon	68-69-69=206	−10
6	(United States) Lexi Thompson	69-67-71=207	−9*
T7	(France) Karine Icher	67-73-68=208	−8
T7	(Thailand) Ariya Jutanugarn	70-70-68=208	−8
T7	(United States) Cristie Kerr	67-71-70=208	−8
T7	(United States) Michelle Wie	68-69-71=208	−8

=== Final round ===
Sunday, April 2, 2017

After a bogey at the 12th hole to fall to 16-under, Thompson was notified by officials of the four-stroke penalty as she walked to the 13th tee; this lowered her score to 12-under, two strokes behind Lee. Both Thompson and Ryu birdied the final hole to finish at the top of the leaderboard at 274 (−14).

Place	Player	Score	To par	Money ($)
T1	(South Korea) Ryu So-yeon	68-69-69-68=274	−14	Playoff
T1	(United States) Lexi Thompson	69-67-71-67=274	−14	Playoff
T3	(Australia) Minjee Lee	70-68-68-69=275	−13	145,200
T3	(South Korea) Inbee Park	69-69-68-69=275	−13	145,200
T3	(Norway) Suzann Pettersen	68-69-68-70=275	−13	145,200
6	(United States) Michelle Wie	68-69-71-69=277	−11	92,608
7	(United States) Cristie Kerr	67-71-70-70=278	−10	77,517
T8	(Thailand) Ariya Jutanugarn	70-70-68-71=279	−9	64,484
T8	(South Korea) Amy Yang	73-71-67-68=279	−9	64,484
10	(France) Karine Icher	67-73-68-72=280	−8	55,565

==== Scorecard ====
Final round

Hole	1	2	3	4	5	6	7	8	9	10	11	12	13	14	15	16	17	18
Par	4	5	4	4	3	4	4	3	5	4	5	4	4	3	4	4	3	5
(South Korea) Ryu	−11	−11	−11	−11	−11	−11	−11	−11	−12	−12	−12	−13	−13	−13	−13	−13	−13	−14
(United States) Thompson	−9	−10	−10	−11	−11	−11	−12	−12	−12	−12	−13	−12	−13	−13	−14	−13	−13	−14
(Australia) Lee	−10	−11	−11	−11	−11	−11	−12	−12	−13	−13	−13	−14	−14	−13	−13	−13	−12	−13
(South Korea) Park	−10	−11	−12	−12	−12	−12	−12	−12	−13	−13	−13	−13	−12	−12	−11	−12	−13	−13
(Norway) Pettersen	−12	−12	−13	−13	−13	−14	−14	−14	−14	−13	−14	−14	−13	−13	−13	−13	−13	−13
(United States) Wie	−8	−9	−8	−8	−7	−7	−8	−8	−8	−8	−9	−9	−8	−9	−9	−9	−10	−11
(United States) Kerr	−8	−8	−8	−8	−8	−9	−9	−9	−9	−9	−9	−9	−9	−9	−9	−9	−9	−10
(Thailand) Jutanugarn	−8	−8	−8	−8	−8	−9	−9	−9	−9	−9	−9	−9	−9	−9	−9	−9	−8	−9
(South Korea) Yang	−5	−7	−7	−6	−6	−5	−5	−5	−6	−6	−6	−6	−7	−8	−9	−9	−9	−9
(France) Icher	−8	−9	−8	−8	−8	−8	−8	−8	−7	−7	−7	−7	−7	−7	−7	−7	−7	−8

Cumulative tournament scores, relative to par

Eagle	Birdie	Bogey

==== Playoff ====
The sudden-death playoff began on the par-5 18th hole; Ryu birdied to win the title.

Place	Player	Score	To par	Money ($)
1	(South Korea) Ryu So-yeon	4	−1	405,000
2	(United States) Lexi Thompson	5	E	250,591
