= Lexi Thompson =

American professional golfer (born 1995)

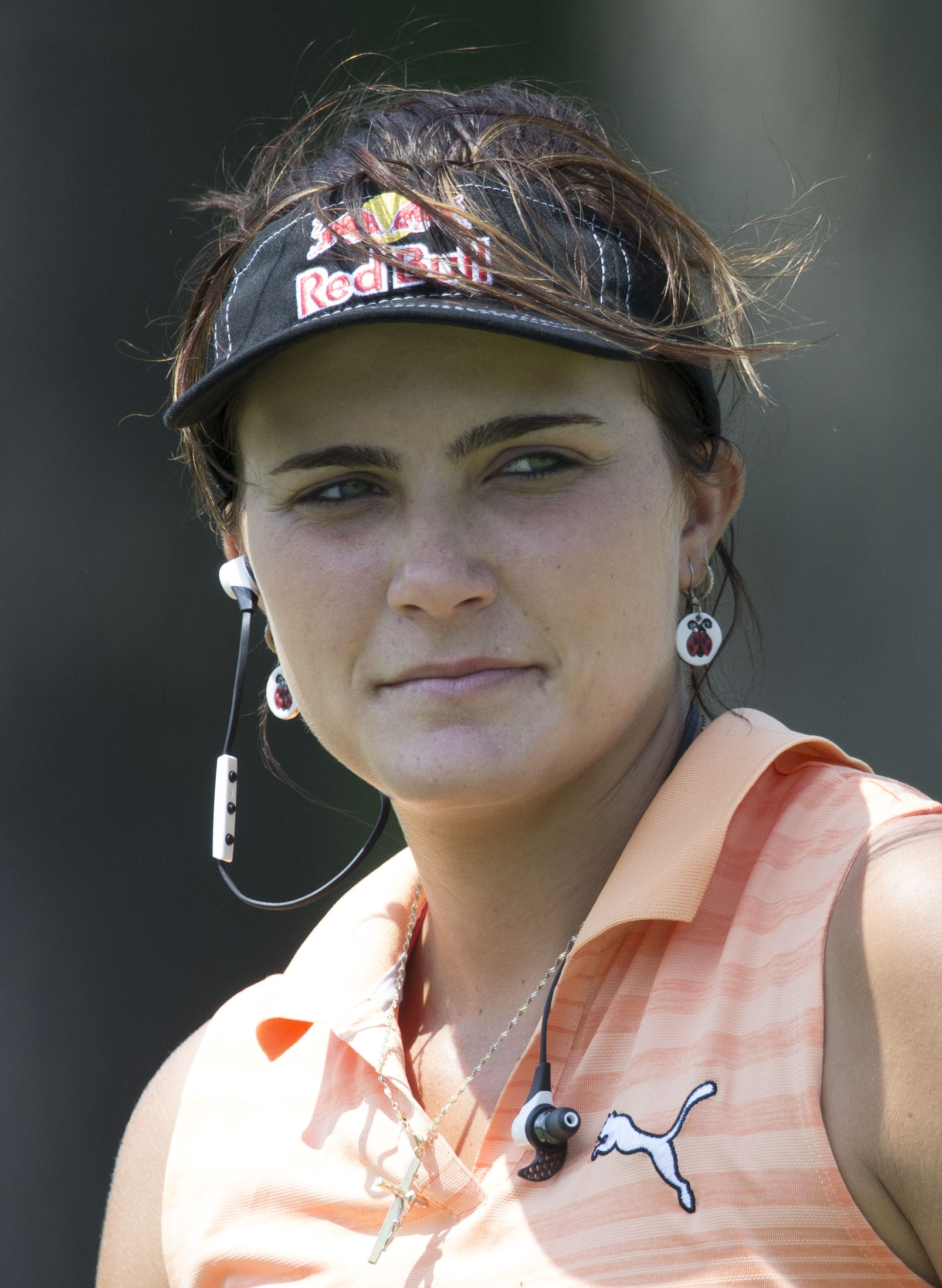
- Thompson at the 2015 Kingsmill Championship

Personal information
- Full name: Alexis Noel Thompson
- Nationality: United States
- Born: February 10, 1995 (age 31) Coral Springs, Florida, U.S.
- Height: 6 ft 0 in (1.83 m)
- Spouse: Max Provost

Career
- Sport: Golf
- Turned professional: 2010
- Current tour: LPGA Tour (joined 2012)
- Professional wins: 15

Number of wins by tour
- LPGA Tour: 11
- Ladies European Tour: 2
- LPGA of Japan Tour: 1
- Other: 1

Best results in LPGA major championships (wins: 1)
- Chevron Championship: Won: 2014
- Women's PGA C'ship: T2: 2022
- U.S. Women's Open: T2: 2019
- Women's British Open: T8: 2016
- Evian Championship: 2nd: 2015

Achievements and awards
- LPGA Vare Trophy: 2017
- Race to the CME Globe: 2017
- GWAA Female Player of the Year: 2017

Alexis Noel Thompson (born February 10, 1995) is an American professional golfer who plays on the LPGA Tour. She has won a total of 15 professional titles during her career, including 11 victories on the LPGA Tour. Her sole major title came at the 2014 Kraft Nabisco Championship. She has represented the United States at seven Solheim Cups, winning the event in 2015, 2017 and 2024.

Thompson set several age-related records early in her career. In 2007, at the age of 12, Thompson became the youngest golfer to qualify for the U.S. Women's Open. In 2010, she was part of the United States team that won the Curtis Cup, and she turned professional afterwards at 15. The next year, Thompson set a record as the youngest-ever winner of an LPGA tournament—then 16 years, seven months, and eight days old—when she won the 2011 Navistar LPGA Classic. Three months later, she became the second-youngest winner of a Ladies European Tour event after capturing the Dubai Ladies Masters, and in 2013 she became the youngest player to compete for the United States in a Solheim Cup. She won her first and only major championship at the 2014 Kraft Nabisco Championship at the age of 19, making her the second-youngest LPGA golfer to have won a major at the time.

Thompson has come close to winning a second major on several occasions. She finished second at the 2015 Evian Championship and lost in a playoff at the 2017 ANA Inspiration after being penalized a total of four penalty strokes during the tournament. She recorded further runner-up finishes at the 2019 U.S. Women's Open and the 2022 Women's PGA Championship and let slip a five-stroke lead during the final round of the 2021 U.S. Women's Open, which she finished in third place.

== Early life ==
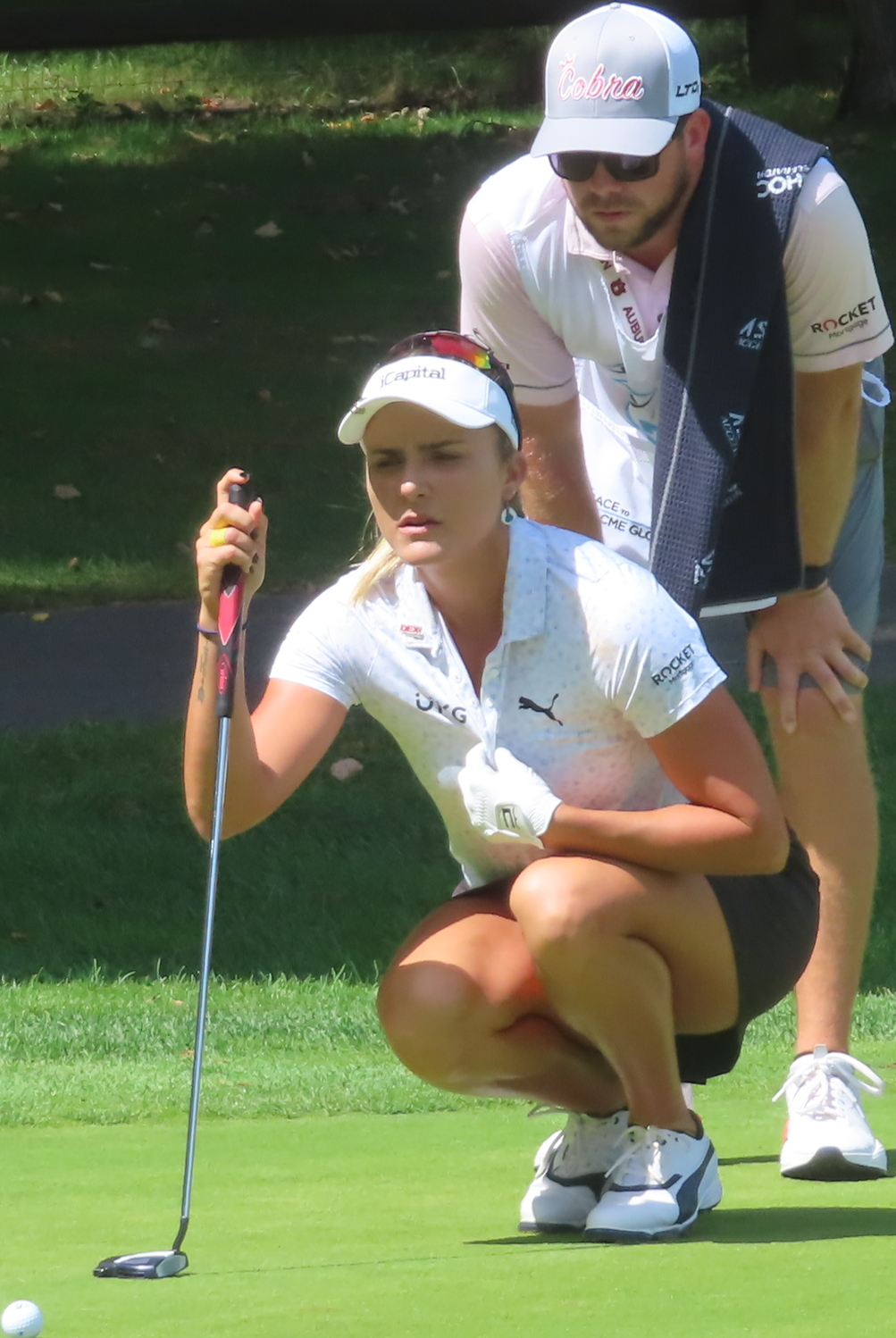
Thompson with her brother Curtis as her caddy at the 2022 Dana Open.

Thompson grew up in a home adjacent to Eagle Trace Golf Club in Coral Springs, Florida. She is the youngest of three siblings; her two brothers Nicholas and Curtis also became professional golfers. She began playing golf at age five and started playing competitively two years later.

Thompson was home-schooled, getting up early in the morning to carry out her studies before playing golf in both the mornings and afternoons. She graduated from high school in July 2012.

== Amateur career ==
In 2003, Thompson was the U.S. Kids under-8 World Champion. She repeated as the under-9 winner the following year. In 2007, aged 12, she became the youngest-ever player to qualify for the U.S. Women's Open. At the tournament, she shot 76-82 and failed to make the cut. Her record was later broken by the then 11-year-old Lucy Li in 2014. In 2007, Thompson won the Aldila Junior Classic to become the second-youngest winner in American Junior Golf Association (AJGA) history, and she also won the Westfield Junior PGA Championship to become the youngest winner in Junior PGA Championship history.

In 2008, Thompson won the U.S. Girls' Junior at Hartford Golf Club, overcoming Karen Chung five and four to seal the title and become the second-youngest winner of the trophy. That year, at the U.S. Women's Open, she failed to make the cut. She also competed in the Junior Ryder Cup in Bowling Green, Kentucky, in which the United States triumphed 22–2 over Europe.

At the 2009 U.S. Women's Open, Thompson placed in a tie for 34th, the first time she had made the cut in the event. She then clinched victory in a playoff at the Verizon Junior Heritage. Thompson was selected to play at the 2009 Junior Solheim Cup, and she helped the United States record a 15.5–8.5 victory over Europe at Aurora Country Club, in Aurora, Illinois.

Thompson played as an amateur in the Women's Australian Open, where she finished tied-16th, and she made the cut at the 2010 Kraft Nabisco Championship, finishing tied-24th. She represented the winning United States team in the 2010 Curtis Cup competition and went undefeated, winning four matches and tying in a fifth. The United States defeated Great Britain and Ireland 12.5–7.5.

== Professional career ==
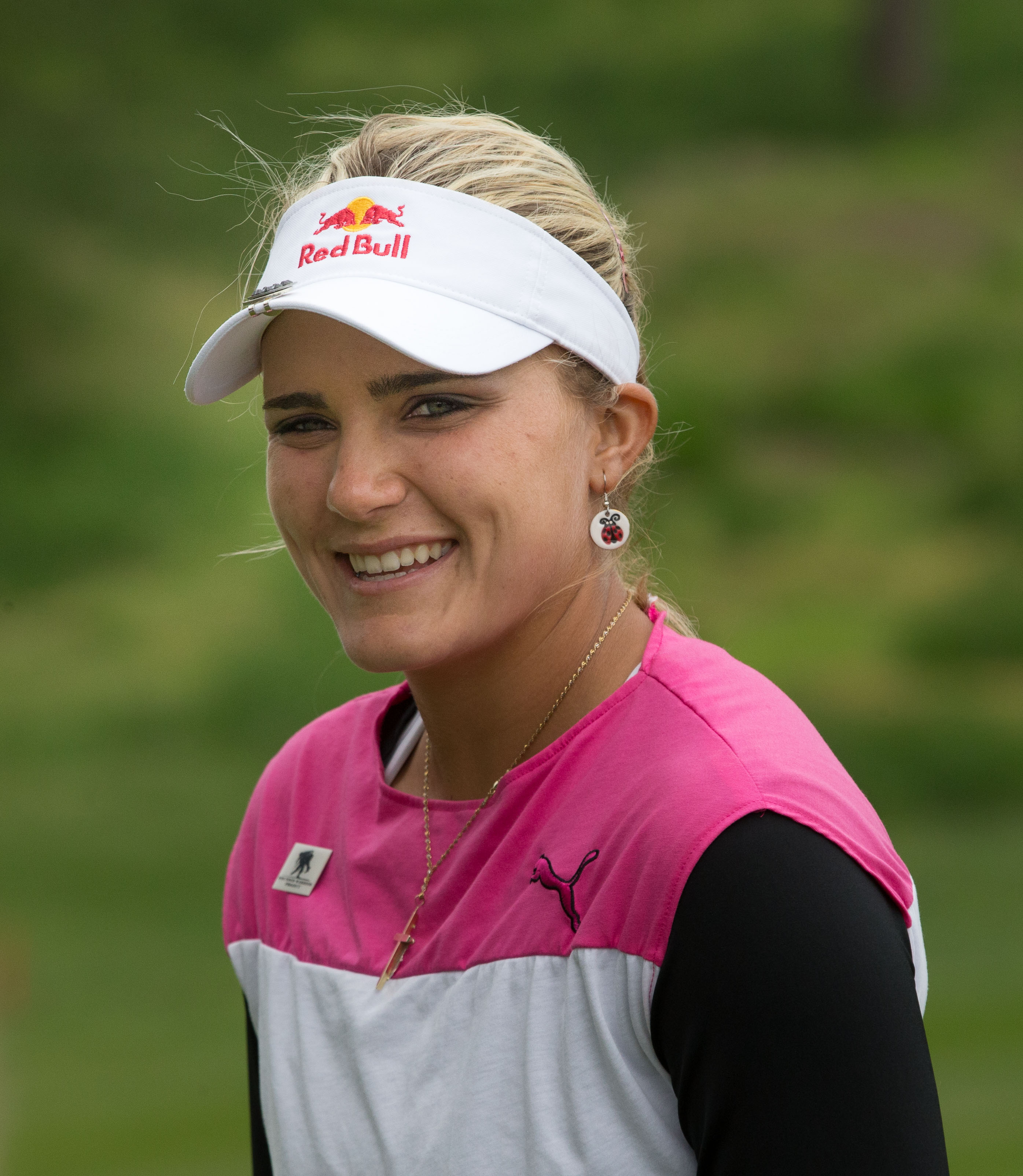
Lexi Thompson, 2013,

=== 2010 ===
On June 16, 2010, Thompson, aged 15, announced that she had turned professional, the youngest female player to do so. She also signed a sponsorship deal with Cobra-PUMA Golf. During the year, she used sponsor exemptions to gain entry into several tournaments. She made her professional debut at the ShopRite LPGA Classic, where she missed the cut.

Thompson finished tied-10th at the 2010 U.S. Women's Open, at six-over-par, nine shots behind the winner Paula Creamer. Two weeks later, at the Evian Masters, she finished tied-2nd, one shot behind Jiyai Shin. Her ranking subsequently rose 75 places to number 74 in the updated Women's World Golf Rankings on July, 26 2010.

In December 2010, Thompson petitioned the LPGA to increase the number of tournaments she could enter using sponsor exemptions from six to twelve. In January 2011, Commissioner Mike Whan denied Thompson's petition, but announced that the LPGA rules would be changed to allow non-members to participate in Monday qualifying for events they wished to enter.

=== 2011 ===
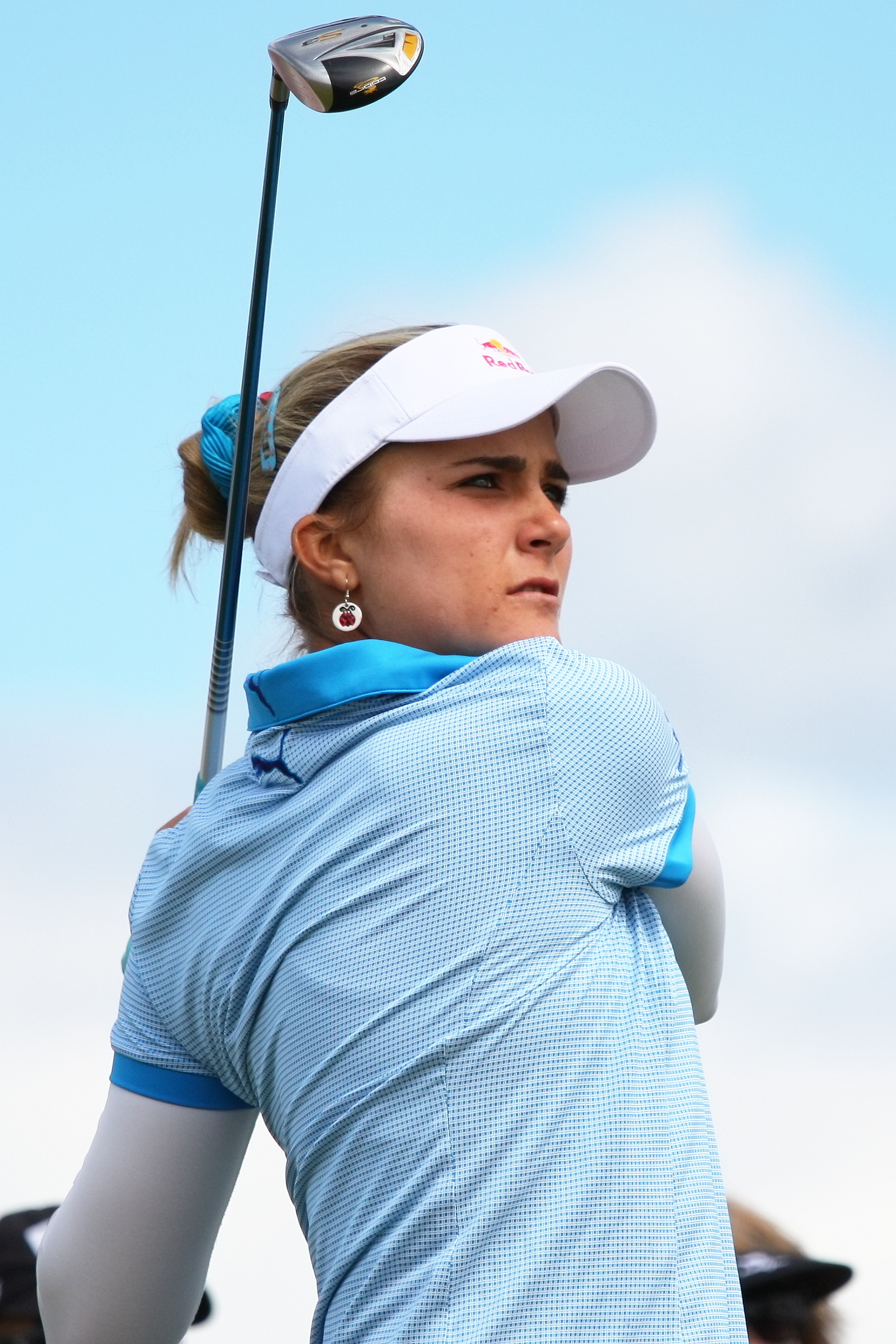
Thompson at the 2013 Women's British Open

In February 2011, she competed at the Women's Australian Open and the ANZ Ladies Masters, where she missed the cut and finished tied-42nd respectively. Returning to the United States, she won a one-round Fuzion Tour event held on February 21 at her home course in Coral Springs, Florida. Tied after 18 holes, she beat Brett Bergeron on the second playoff hole. Victory also meant she became just the second woman to win a Fuzion Minor League event. In March, Thompson entered the Monday qualifier for the LPGA Kia Classic but failed to qualify.

Thompson's first LPGA tournament in 2011 was the Avnet LPGA Classic, which she entered with a sponsor's exemption. After three rounds, she was tied for the lead. In the final round, she carded a 78, which included back-to-back double-bogeys on the 14th and 15th holes. She ended the event tied for 19th, nine strokes behind the winner. In September, she won her first LPGA tournament, the Navistar LPGA Classic, by a five-stroke margin. Aged 16 years, 7 months, 8 days, her victory meant she became the youngest ever winner on the LPGA Tour, breaking the previous record set by Marlene Hagge at age 18 in 1952. Her record stood for 11 months until 15-year-old Lydia Ko won the 2012 CN Canadian Women's Open the following year.

On December 17, 2011, Thompson won the Dubai Ladies Masters, an event on the Ladies European Tour (LET), with a four-stroke margin. This win made her the youngest professional winner on the LET at age 16 years, 10 months, 8 days, and the second-youngest overall, after Amy Yang, who was four months younger when she won the 2006 ANZ Ladies Masters as an amateur.

Thompson successfully petitioned the LPGA for an age waiver allowing her to enter the 2011 LPGA Qualifying School for Tour membership in 2012. The first of three stages was held in July at the LPGA International course in Daytona Beach, Florida. Thompson won stage one by ten strokes, with the top 50 finishers and ties advancing to stage two. Having won the Navistar LPGA Classic, Thompson withdrew from qualifying school, and was awarded membership of the tour for 2012.

=== 2012 ===
Thompson made a course-record equaling nine-under-par 63 in her opening round of the 2012 Navistar LPGA Classic. She was unable to defend her title from the year previously, finishing the event two strokes behind Stacy Lewis. In her next tournament, Thompson placed tied-5th at the Shoprite LPGA Classic. She ended the 2012 LPGA Tour winless, but earned over $600,000 in prize money and recorded four top-10 finishes.

=== 2013 ===
Thompson was named by the United States to make her Solheim Cup debut, the youngest ever player to represent the United States at the competition. In August, they were defeated 10–18 by Europe at the Colorado Golf Club, and she finished the event with a 1–2–0 (win–loss–tie) record, which included a 4 and 3 victory over Caroline Masson in the singles. One month later, she recorded a third-place finish at the Evian Championship, before earning her second LPGA Tour win with a four-stroke victory at the Sime Darby LPGA Malaysia in October. She also won the Lorena Ochoa Invitational the following month, beating second-placed Stacy Lewis by one stroke.

=== 2014 ===
Thompson earned her first major championship at the 2014 Kraft Nabisco Championship in April. The victory made her the then second-youngest women's major winner (after Morgan Pressel). She recorded rounds of 73, 64, 69, and 68 at Mission Hills Country Club in Rancho Mirage, California to secure a three-stroke victory over Michelle Wie. After her win, Thompson said: "This was one of my goals coming into the year, to win a major...It's such a huge honor with all the history behind the tournament." She also recorded top-10 major finishes at the U.S. Women's Open, where she finished in a tie for seventh, and at the Evian Championship, where she ended tied for tenth. In total, she made eight top-10 finishes on the LPGA Tour during the year.

=== 2015 ===
Thompson finished seventh at the ANA Inspiration in April and third at the Women's PGA Championship in June. She then claimed victory at the Meijer LPGA Classic in July. Trailing by four strokes after the third round, Thompson shot six-under-par on the final day to seal a one-stroke victory over Gerina Piller. She then won her sixth LPGA Tour title, and her second of the year, at the LPGA KEB Hana Bank Championship in Incheon, South Korea. Thompson finished the tournament 15-under-par and said afterwards: "I don’t really play for myself as much as I play for my country. I love being an American and it’s a great honor to be the first American to win in Korea." At the 2015 Evian Championship in September, Thompson finished in second place, six strokes adrift of the winner Lydia Ko.

Thompson then played in the 2015 Solheim Cup held at Golf Club St. Leon-Rot in Baden-Württemberg, Germany. The United States claimed a narrow 14.5–13.5 victory, with Thompson finishing with an undefeated 2–0–2 record. Thompson won two matches alongside playing partner Cristie Kerr and halved her singles match with Carlota Ciganda on the closing day. In total, she made 13 top-10 finishes on the LPGA Tour during the season and earned $1,763,904 in prize money.

=== 2016 ===
In February 2016, Thompson earned her seventh LPGA Tour win at the Honda LPGA Thailand. She ended the event 20-under-par to win the tournament by six strokes from In Gee Chun. Thompson held the lead after the penultimate round of the ANA Inspiration in April, but eventually had to settle for fifth place, three strokes behind the tournament winner Lydia Ko. In May, she earned her first victory in Japan, winning the World Ladies Championship Salonpas Cup by a two-stroke margin over Ayaka Watanabe. That same month, she also recorded top-10 finishes in the Kingsmill Championship (tied-5th) and the LPGA Volvik Championship (tied-6th). In June, Thompson finished tied-4th at the Meijer LPGA Classic.

In July, Thompson was part of the United States team that won the 2016 International Crown. The United States finished the event one-point clear of South Korea. She then finished tied-8th at the Women's British Open. Thompson was selected by the United States to compete at the 2016 Summer Olympics in Rio de Janeiro. She finished tied-19th, seven strokes adrift of the bronze-medal position; she later had the Olympic Games emblem tattooed below the palm of her hand. In December, she became the second woman, after Annika Sorenstam, to compete at the QBE Shootout. There, she formed a team with Bryson DeChambeau, and they finished the event tied-11th.

=== 2017 ===
At the Pure Silk-Bahamas LPGA Classic, Thompson shot a course-record twelve-under-par 61 in her second round. This was the second-best round to par in LPGA history. She later missed a putt to win the tournament, and Brittany Lincicome defeated her in the resulting playoff with a birdie on the first extra hole. In April, Thompson was penalized a total of four strokes for replacing her ball incorrectly on the green while playing the 17th hole of her third round at the ANA Inspiration. The infringement was reported by a TV viewer and assessed after completion of the round, which meant that in addition to receiving a two-stroke penalty for replacing the ball incorrectly, she was also penalized two strokes for signing an incorrect scorecard. After four rounds, she finished in a playoff, eventually losing to Ryu So-yeon. Afterwards, Thompson said: "It is unfortunate with what happened. I did not mean that at all. I had no idea that I did it."

Thompson earned a win at the Kingsmill Championship in May, where she finished with a tournament-record 20-under-par. In June, at the Manulife LPGA Classic, Thompson was defeated in a three-way playoff by Ariya Jutanugarn. Thompson had held a four-shot lead in the event after nine holes on the final day but shot four bogeys in the back nine to lose her advantage. She then recorded a tied-7th finish at the Women's PGA Championship. Thompson won the inaugural Indy Women in Tech Championship in September for her ninth LPGA Tour win. She claimed the title by a four-stroke margin.

At the 2017 Solheim Cup, Thompson finished with an unbeaten 2–0–2 record at Des Moines Golf and Country Club, Iowa, as the United States secured a 16.5–11.5 overall victory. Thompson's two winning points at the event came with playing partner Kerr on day two. Thompson and Kerr played together for a total of six matches during the 2015 and 2017 editions of the event, winning four and halving two, with their five points being a joint partnership record in Solheim Cup history. Thompson halved her singles match with Anna Nordqvist, having been four down after nine holes. At the CME Group Tour Championship in November, Thompson missed a two-foot putt on the 18th hole, and Ariya Jutanugarn finished with back-to-back birdies to secure the title by one stroke. The result was enough for Thompson to secure the overall Race to the CME Globe for the $1 million bonus. Thompson won the Vare Trophy in 2017 for having the lowest scoring average on the LPGA Tour. Her 69.114 average was an all-time record.

=== 2018 ===
In February, Thompson finished tied-2nd at the Honda LPGA Thailand. She finished tied-5th at the U.S. Women's Open in June, but later withdrew from the Women's British Open and took a month-long leave from the LPGA Tour. In a post on Instagram, she explained: "I have not truly felt like myself for quite some time", adding: "I am therefore taking this time to recharge my mental batteries, and to focus on myself away from the game of professional golf." Thompson competed for the United States at the 2018 International Crown in October and helped the United States finish in a tie for second at the competition.

Prior to the CME Group Tour Championship in November, it was reported that Thompson had split from her caddie Kevin McAlpine. She then won the tournament with an 18-under-par total, giving her a four-shot victory over Nelly Korda. The victory was her first in over a year and the tenth of her professional career. Afterwards, Thompson stated: "This is a special event for me growing up in Florida." In December, she competed in the QBE Shootout with playing partner Tony Finau; the duo finished in seventh position.

=== 2019 ===
Thompson finished 3rd at the ANA Inspiration in April, four strokes behind Ko Jin-young. In June, she finished tied-2nd in the U.S. Women's Open at Charleston. She finished the event two shots behind Jeong-eun Lee6. The following week, she finished one shot clear of Lee6 at Seaview to win the ShopRite LPGA Classic. Thompson made an eagle at the final hole to seal her victory, which marked the seventh consecutive year that she had won an event on the LPGA Tour. She also recorded runner-up finishes at the Meijer LPGA Classic and the Marathon Classic.

Thompson finished without a win in the 2019 Solheim Cup at Gleneagles Hotel, Scotland. She posted a 0–2–2 record as the United States were defeated by Europe 13.5‍–‍14.5. She lost her singles match to Georgia Hall 2 and 1 on the final day. She finished with a tied-6th place finish at the CME Group Tour Championship.

=== 2020 ===
In January, Thompson competed at the Diamond Resorts Tournament of Champions and finished tied-7th. In March, the LPGA suspended competition due to the COVID-19 pandemic. In August, after the LPGA Tour had resumed, Thompson was involved in a rules controversy during her opening round at the Women's British Open, when she was observed by an official moving a tuft of grass behind her ball with her club; it was later deemed that her lie had not been improved and she escaped any penalty. She went on to miss the cut. She finished fourth at the ANA Inspiration in September, two strokes behind Mirim Lee. At the CME Group Tour Championship, she finished in a tie for 5th.

=== 2021 ===
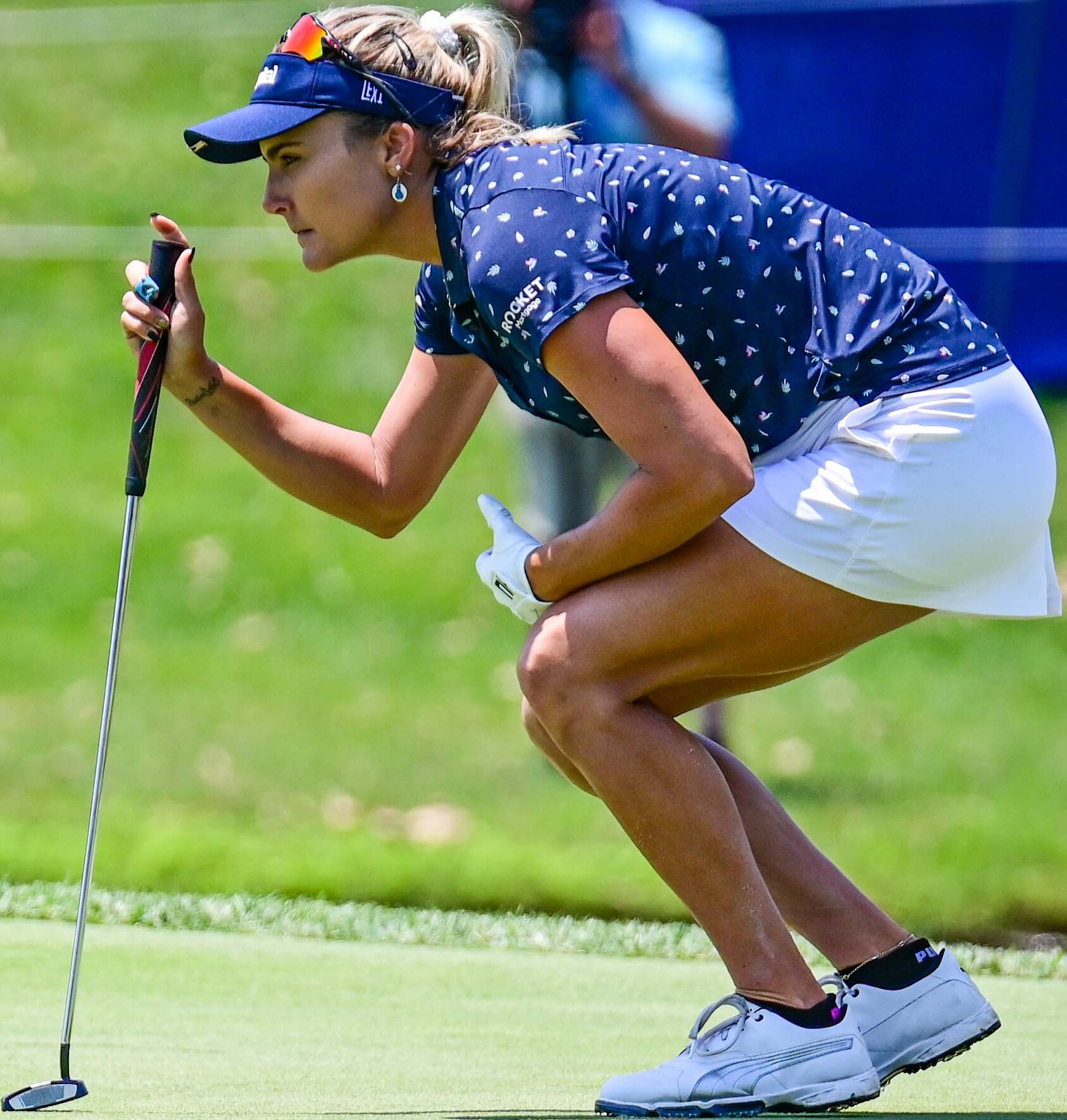
Thompson at the 2022 Women's PGA Championship

In February, Thompson finished tied-2nd at the Gainbridge LPGA, three strokes behind champion Nelly Korda. The following month, she finished joint runner-up again, this time at the Kia Classic where she ended five shots behind Inbee Park. In June, Thompson led the U.S. Women's Open going into the last round at The Olympic Club in San Francisco, California. Towards the end of her front nine, Thompson led by five shots, but she then shot a five-over-par 41 on the back nine and missed out on a playoff by one stroke. Thompson's caddie Jack Fulghum was taken ill with heatstroke during her first round at the Summer Olympics in Tokyo. Donna Wilkins, a coach on the United States golf team, stood in for him for the remainder of the round. She finished the event in 33rd position.

Thompson was a member of the United States team that lost the 2021 Solheim Cup to Europe 13–15 at Inverness Club in Toledo, Ohio. Thompson finished 1–2–1 for the tournament, with her win coming in the day two foursomes when she and playing partner Brittany Altomare defeated Charley Hull and Emily Kristine Pedersen. In the singles, she halved her match with Anna Nordqvist. In the Pelican Women's Championship, Thompson bogeyed the final hole to end up in a four-way playoff, which was won by Nelly Korda at the first extra hole. She then finished eighth at the CME Group Tour Championship. Across her LPGA season, she made the cut at all 19 tournaments that she entered and recorded seven top-10 finishes.

=== 2022 ===
In January, Thompson finished tied-6th at the Gainbridge LPGA at Boca Rio. The following month, she finished runner-up at the LPGA Drive On Championship, three strokes behind champion Leona Maguire. Thompson finished tied-4th at the Chevron Championship in April and second at the LPGA Founders Cup in May. After her tie for fifth place at the Meijer LPGA Classic in June, she moved to tenth all-time on the career LPGA Tour money list, having earned $12,608,045 in 230 events.

In the Women's PGA Championship at the Congressional Country Club, Thompson finished tied-2nd, losing to winner Chun In-gee by one stroke. Thompson had held a two-stroke lead before making back-to-back bogeys at the 16th and 17th holes on the final day. In October, Thompson was victorious in the individual event of the Aramco Team Series-New York, winning the event by three strokes. The following month, Thompson recorded her fourth second-place finish on the LPGA Tour for the year at the Pelican Women's Championship. There, she finished one stroke behind Nelly Korda. She finished the year with ten top-10 finishes on the LPGA Tour.

=== 2023 ===
Thompson represented the United States at the International Crown in May, where they were defeated in the semi-finals by Thailand. The United States ended the competition in third position after beating Sweden in the third-place playoff. Thompson arrived at the 2023 Solheim Cup in September in a bad run of form, having missed the cut in eight of her last eleven events, with a season-best LPGA Tour finish of tied-19th at the Kroger Queen City Championship. Despite this, Thompson recorded three victories from her four matches at the Solheim Cup, finishing with a 3–1–0 record that included a 2 and 1 victory over Emily Kristine Pedersen in the singles. Europe and the United States finished tied on 14 points, resulting in Europe retaining the trophy.

In October, Thompson became the seventh woman to play on the PGA Tour when she played in the Shriners Children's Open. She shot 73-69 to miss the cut by three strokes. During 2023, she made the cut at 6 of the 14 LPGA Tour events that she played, with a best finish of tied-5th at the Ascendent LPGA Benefiting Volunteers of America in October.

=== 2024 ===
On May 28, 2024, Thompson, 29, announced that she would step back from full-time golf at the end of the 2024 LPGA season after 14 years as a professional golfer. In June, at the Meijer LPGA Classic, Thompson was beaten in a playoff by Lilia Vu. The following week, she recorded her first top-10 finish in a major since 2022 when she finished tied-9th in the Women's PGA Championship.

Thompson competed for the United States in the 2024 Solheim Cup at the Robert Trent Jones Golf Club in Virginia, with her team clinching a 15.5‍–‍12.5 victory. She won one of her four matches, securing a victory in the foursomes with Lauren Coughlin against Georgia Hall and Maja Stark. Thompson finished with a 1–3–0 record in the tournament. In November, Thompson played her final tournament as a full-time LPGA member at the CME Group Tour Championship at Tiburon Golf Club in Naples, Florida. She finished tied-49th at two-under-par.

=== 2025–26: Part-time schedule ===
Now playing part-time on the tour, Thompson finished tied-4th at the Meijer LPGA Classic in June. She had held a share of the lead at the end of the third round, but she lost ground on the final day. The following week she finished tied-12th at the Women's PGA Championship. She then finished second in the team event at the Dow Championship, where she and partner Megan Khang were defeated by Im Jin-hee and Lee So-mi in a playoff. She then announced that she would take a five-week break from the sport, consequently missing the Women's British Open and the Evian Championship. Reflecting on her 'retirement' announcement the previous year, Thompson stated: "I feel like once I made the announcement, I feel it really got misconstrued that I was retiring. But I never said that word. I just said I was stepping back from a full-time schedule...Just really wanted to dial back my schedule and have more of a life balance."

In her first four events of 2026, Thompson's best result was a tied-12th at the Chevron Championship. With a world ranking of 98, she consequently missed out on a place at the U.S. Women's Open, the first time she had missed the tournament since qualifying as a twelve-year-old in 2007. A hip injury caused her to miss the Meijer Classic and the Women's PGA Championship, and she failed to make the cut at the first two tournaments following her return. She missed out on a place at the Solheim Cup after United States captain Angela Stanford did not name her as a captain's pick. Later in the year, she joined the TGL Golf League, where she competed for Motor City Golf Club.

== Personal life ==
Thompson partnered with the SEAL Legacy Foundation, and in May 2017, she skydived with a United States Navy SEAL before the start of the Kingsmill Championship pro-am.

In October 2018, Thompson shared how body image issues had affected her. She explained that she would put herself through two "brutal" workouts every day, had cut back on eating, and that she would weigh herself "constantly" while comparing herself to thin models. She described how she had been self-critical of her own body, but that over time her mindset had changed. Thompson stated: "what I've learned is that I'm not going to deprive myself in the one life I get to live, I'm going to enjoy life and my food. You should never compare your body to others it’s a never ending battle of being miserable trust me. Your body is your body, it is beautiful so embrace it."

In March 2026, Thompson married her partner Max Provost. In August 2026, she announced that they were expecting their first child together. She is a supporter of the NHL team Florida Panthers.

== Amateur wins ==
- 2003 U.S. Kids Golf World Championship
- 2004 U.S. Kids Golf World Championship
- 2007 Junior PGA Championship
- 2008 U.S. Girls' Junior
- 2009 Verizon Junior Heritage, Junior PGA Championship

== Professional wins (15) ==
=== LPGA Tour wins (11) ===
Legend
Major championships (1)
Other LPGA Tour (10)

No.	Date	Tournament	Winning score	To par	Margin of victory	Runner(s)-up	Ref
1	Sep 18, 2011	Navistar LPGA Classic	66-68-67-70=271	−17	5 strokes	(United States) Tiffany Joh	
2	Oct 13, 2013	Sime Darby LPGA Malaysia	67-63-66-69=265	−19	4 strokes	(China) Shanshan Feng	
3	Nov 17, 2013	Lorena Ochoa Invitational	72-64-67-69=272	−16	1 stroke	(United States) Stacy Lewis	
4	Apr 6, 2014	Kraft Nabisco Championship	73-64-69-68=274	−14	3 strokes	(United States) Michelle Wie	
5	Jul 26, 2015	Meijer LPGA Classic	69-64-68-65=266	−18	1 stroke	(United States) Gerina Piller (United States) Lizette Salas	
6	Oct 18, 2015	LPGA KEB Hana Bank Championship	68-67-69-69=273	−15	1 stroke	(South Korea) Park Sung-hyun (Taiwan) Yani Tseng	
7	Feb 28, 2016	Honda LPGA Thailand	64-72-64-68=268	−20	6 strokes	(South Korea) Chun In-gee	
8	May 21, 2017	Kingsmill Championship	65-65-69-65=264	−20	5 strokes	(South Korea) Chun In-gee	
9	Sep 9, 2017	Indy Women in Tech Championship	63-66-68=197	−19	4 strokes	(New Zealand) Lydia Ko	
10	Nov 18, 2018	CME Group Tour Championship	65-67-68-70=270	−18	4 strokes	(United States) Nelly Korda	
11	Jun 9, 2019	ShopRite LPGA Classic	64-70-67=201	−11	1 stroke	(South Korea) Lee Jeong-eun	

LPGA Tour playoff record (0–6)

No.	Year	Tournament	Opponent	Result	Ref
1	2017	Pure Silk-Bahamas LPGA Classic	(United States) Brittany Lincicome	Lost to birdie on first extra hole	
2	2017	ANA Inspiration	(South Korea) Ryu So-yeon	Lost to birdie on first extra hole	
3	2017	Manulife LPGA Classic	(South Korea) Chun In-gee (Thailand) Ariya Jutanugarn	Jutanugarn won with birdie on first extra hole	
4	2021	Pelican Women's Championship	(United States) Nelly Korda (New Zealand) Lydia Ko (South Korea) Kim Sei-young	Korda won with birdie on first extra hole	
5	2024	Meijer LPGA Classic	(United States) Lilia Vu (Australia) Grace Kim	Vu won with birdie on third extra hole	
6	2025	Dow Championship (with (United States) Megan Khang)	(South Korea) Im Jin-hee and (South Korea) Lee So-mi	Lost to birdie on first extra hole	

=== Ladies European Tour wins (2) ===
No.	Date	Tournament	Winning score	To par	Margin of victory	Runner-up	Ref
1	Dec 17, 2011	Dubai Ladies Masters	70-66-70-67=273	−15	4 strokes	(South Africa) Lee-Anne Pace	
2	Oct 15, 2022	Aramco Team Series – New York	71-65-69=205	−11	3 strokes	(Canada) Brooke Henderson (Sweden) Madelene Sagström	

=== LPGA of Japan Tour wins (1) ===
No.	Date	Tournament	Winning score	To par	Margin of victory	Runner-up	Ref
1	8 May 2016	World Ladies Championship Salonpas Cup	70-68-65-72=275	−13	2 strokes	(Japan) Ayaka Watanabe	

=== Other wins (1) ===
2011 TPC February Shootout (Fuzion Minor League Golf Tour)

== Major championships ==
=== Wins (1) ===
Year	Championship	54 holes	Winning score	Margin	Runner-up	Ref
2014	Kraft Nabisco Championship	Tied for lead	−14 (73-64-69-68=274)	3 strokes	(United States) Michelle Wie	

=== Results timeline ===
Results not in chronological order.

Tournament	2007	2008	2009	2010	2011	2012	2013	2014	2015	2016	2017	2018	2019	2020	2021	2022	2023	2024	2025	2026
Chevron Championship			T21TLA	T24		T22	T48	1	7	5	2	T20	3	4	T36	T4	CUT	CUT	T14	T12
U.S. Women's Open	CUT	CUT	T34	T10	CUT	T14	T13	T7	T42	T32	T27	T5	T2	CUT	3	T20	CUT	CUT	CUT	
Women's PGA Championship					CUT	T30	T28	T17	3	T22	T7	T15	T26	T30	T52	T2	T47	T9	T12	
The Evian Championship ^							3	T10	2	T22	T48	CUT	CUT	NT						
Women's British Open						T17	CUT	T54	T17	T8	T11		T16	CUT	T20	CUT	CUT	T55		

^ The Evian Championship was added as a major in 2013.

Win
Top 10
Did not play

LA = low amateur
CUT = missed the half-way cut
NT = no tournament
"T" = tied

=== Summary ===
Tournament	Wins	2nd	3rd	Top-5	Top-10	Top-25	Events	Cuts made
Chevron Championship	1	1	1	6	7	13	17	15
U.S. Women's Open	0	1	1	3	5	8	19	12
Women's PGA Championship	0	1	1	2	4	8	15	14
The Evian Championship	0	1	1	2	3	4	7	5
Women's British Open	0	0	0	0	1	6	12	8
Totals	1	4	4	13	20	39	70	54

- Most consecutive cuts made – 24 (2013 Evian – 2018 Women's PGA)
- Longest streak of top 10s – 3 (twice)

== LPGA Tour career summary ==
Year	Tournaments played	Cuts made*	Wins	2nds	3rds	Top 10s	Best finish	Earnings ($)	Money list rank	Scoring average	Scoring rank
2007	1	0	0	0	0	0	MC	n/a	n/a	79.00	n/a
2008	1	0	0	0	0	0	MC	n/a	n/a	76.00	n/a
2009	3	3	0	0	0	0	T27	n/a	n/a	72.25	n/a
2010	6	4	0	1	0	2^{1}	T2	319,831^{1}	n/a	72.21	n/a
2011	8	5	1	0	0	1^{1}	1	244,298^{1}	n/a	73.81	n/a
2012	23	19	0	2	0	4	2	611,021^{2}	21	71.57	24
2013	24	21	2	0	2	7	1	1,206,109	6	70.88	18
2014	25	21	1	1	1	8	1	946,764	12	71.03	17
2015	24	23	2	1	1	13	1	1,763,904	5	70.01	4
2016	19	18	1	0	0	9	1	888,571	18	70.37	10
2017	21	20	2	6	0	10	1	1,877,181	3	69.11	1
2018	20	18	1	1	1	7	1	1,223,748	9	70.01	5
2019	21	16	1	3	1	8	1	1,537,292	6	70.29	17
2020	12	10	0	0	0	3	4	404,237	26	70.51	8
2021	19	19	0	3	1	7	T2	1,254,423	10	69.63	6
2022	18	14	0	4	0	8	2	1,929,718	8	69.70	8
2023	14	6	0	0	0	3	5	284,048	83	71.35	64
2024	18	12	0	1	1	4	T2	811,501	50	71.02	35
2025	13	9	0	1	0	2	2	759,710	48	70.80	41
Totals^	271 (2012)	226 (2012)	11	24	8	93^{1}	1	15,498,227	10		

^ Official as of 2025 season
* Includes matchplay and other events without a cut.
^{1} Earnings and top-10s prior to 2012 are unofficial because Thompson was not an LPGA member.
^{2} Official 2012 earnings do not include $23,107 from T14 finish at the Honda LPGA Thailand. LPGA rules specify that earnings by players who gain entrance to an international tournament using a sponsor's exemption are unofficial.

== World ranking ==
Position in Women's World Golf Rankings at the end of each calendar year.

Year	World ranking	Source
2009	246	
2010	89	
2011	38	
2012	24	
2013	9	
2014	10	
2015	4	
2016	5	
2017	4	
2018	5	
2019	10	
2020	11	
2021	12	
2022	6	
2023	31	
2024	51	
2025	78	

== U.S. national team appearances ==
Amateur

- Junior Ryder Cup: 2008 (winners)
- Junior Solheim Cup: 2009 (winners)
- Curtis Cup: 2010 (winners)

Professional

- Solheim Cup: 2013, 2015 (winners), 2017 (winners), 2019, 2021, 2023, 2024 (winners)
- International Crown: 2014, 2016 (winners), 2018, 2023

=== Curtis Cup record ===
Year	Total matches	Total W–L–H	Singles W–L–H	Foursomes W–L–H	Fourballs W–L–H	Points won	Points %
Career	5	4–0–1	1–0–0	1–0–1	2–0–0	4.5	90.0
2010	5	4–0–1	1–0–0 def. S. Watson 6&5	1–0–1 halved w/ J. Korda, won w/ J. Korda 3&1	2–0–0 won w/ J. Johnson 3&2, won w/ J. Korda 2&1	4.5	90.0

=== Solheim Cup record ===
Year	Total matches	Total W–L–H	Singles W–L–H	Foursomes W–L–H	Fourballs W–L–H	Points won	Points %
Career	27	10–10–7	2–2–3	6–2–1	2–6–3	13.5	50.0
2013	3	1–2–0	1–0–0 def. C. Masson 4&3	0–0–0	0–2–0 lost w/ S. Lewis 1 dn lost w/ P. Creamer 2 dn	1.0	33.3
2015	4	2–0–2	0–0–1 halved w/ C. Ciganda	1–0–0 won w/ C. Kerr 2&1	1–0–1 halved w/ C. Kerr won w/ C. Kerr 3&2	3.0	75.0
2017	4	2–0–2	0–0–1 halved w/ A. Nordqvist	1–0–1 halved w/ C. Kerr won w/ C. Kerr 5&3	1–0–0 won w/ C. Kerr 4&2	3.0	75.0
2019	4	0–2–2	0–1–0 lost to G. Hall 2&1	0–1–0 lost w/ B. Altomare 2&1	0–0–2 halved w/ J. Korda halved w/ M. Alex	1.0	25.0
2021	4	1–2–1	0–0–1 halved w/ A. Nordqvist	1–1–0 lost w/ B. Altomare 1 dn won w/ B. Altomare 2&1	0–1–0 lost w/ M. Harigae 4&3	1.5	37.5
2023	4	3–1–0	1–0–0 def. E. Pedersen 2&1	2–0–0 won w/ M. Khang 2&1 won w/ M. Khang 1 up	0–1–0 lost w/ L. Vu 1 dn	3.0	75.0
2024	4	1–3–0	0–1–0 lost to C. Boutier 1 dn	1–0–0 won w/ L. Coughlin 4&3	0–2–0 lost w/ Al. Lee 6&5 lost w/ A. Ewing 2&1	1.0	25.0

== See also ==
- List of golfers with most LPGA major championship wins
- List of golfers with most LPGA Tour wins
