= 2014 LPGA Tour =

Women's golf competition

2014 LPGA Tour season
- Duration: January 23, 2014 – November 23, 2014
- Number of official events: 33
- Most wins: 3 (New Zealand) Lydia Ko, (United States) Stacy Lewis, (South Korea) Inbee Park
- Race to CME Globe Winner: (New Zealand) Lydia Ko
- Money leader: (United States) Stacy Lewis
- Vare Trophy: (United States) Stacy Lewis
- Player of the Year: (United States) Stacy Lewis
- Rookie of the Year: (New Zealand) Lydia Ko

The 2014 LPGA Tour was a series of weekly golf tournaments for elite female golfers from around the world. The Tour began at Ocean Club Golf Course on Paradise Island in The Bahamas on January 23 and ended on November 23 at Grand Cypress Golf Club in Orlando, Florida. The tournaments were sanctioned by the United States–based Ladies Professional Golf Association (LPGA).

The most significant addition to the Tour in 2014 was a new team event, the International Crown. To be held each even-numbered year (those in which the Solheim Cup is not held), the event involved four-woman teams from eight countries competing in a four-day match play format. The eight qualifying countries were those whose four top players are cumulatively ranked highest in the Women's World Golf Rankings as of the end of the preceding LPGA season. The individual participants from each qualified country were determined by the rankings immediately prior to the Kraft Nabisco Championship.

Qualification for the season-ending CME Group Tour Championship changed for 2014 and a $1 million bonus was added. Previously, the top three finishers in each tournament, not previously qualified, earned entry to the tournament. The field in 2014 was determined by a season-long points race, the "Race to the CME Globe". All players making the cut in a tournament earned points with 500 points going to the winner. The five major champions had a higher points distribution with 625 points to the winner. No-cut tournaments only awarded points to the top 40 finishers (top 20 for the Lorena Ochoa Invitational). Only LPGA members were eligible to earn points. The top 72 players on the points list gained entry into the Tour Championship as well as any tournament winners, whether or not an LPGA member, not in the top 72. Points were reset before the tournament such that only the top three players were guaranteed to win the Race by winning the tournament and only the top nine had a mathematical chance of winning the Race. The winner of the points race received a $1 million bonus that did not count on the official money list. The Race is similar to the PGA Tour's FedEx Cup and the European Tour's Race to Dubai.

== Schedule and results ==
The number in parentheses after winners' names is the player's total number wins in official money individual events on the LPGA Tour, including that event.

Date	Tournament	Location	Winner	WWGR points	Purse ($)	Winner's share ($)
Jan 26	Pure Silk-Bahamas LPGA Classic	Bahamas	(United States) Jessica Korda (2)	34	1,300,000	195,000
Feb 16	ISPS Handa Women's Australian Open	Australia	(Australia) Karrie Webb (40)	43	1,200,000	180,000
Feb 23	Honda LPGA Thailand	Thailand	(Sweden) Anna Nordqvist (3)	62	1,500,000	225,000
Mar 2	HSBC Women's Champions	Singapore	(United States) Paula Creamer (10)	62	1,400,000	210,000
Mar 23	JTBC Founders Cup	Arizona	(Australia) Karrie Webb (41)	62	1,500,000	225,000
Mar 30	Kia Classic	California	(Sweden) Anna Nordqvist (4)	62	1,700,000	255,000
Apr 6	Kraft Nabisco Championship	California	(United States) Lexi Thompson (4)	100	2,000,000	300,000
Apr 19	LPGA Lotte Championship	Hawaii	(United States) Michelle Wie (3)	46	1,700,000	255,000
Apr 27	Swinging Skirts LPGA Classic	California	(New Zealand) Lydia Ko (3)	62	1,800,000	270,000
May 4	North Texas LPGA Shootout	Texas	(United States) Stacy Lewis (9)	43	1,300,000	195,000
May 18	Kingsmill Championship	Virginia	(United States) Lizette Salas (1)	50	1,300,000	195,000
May 25	Airbus LPGA Classic	Alabama	(United States) Jessica Korda (3)	53	1,300,000	195,000
Jun 1	ShopRite LPGA Classic	New Jersey	(United States) Stacy Lewis (10)	62	1,500,000	225,000
Jun 8	Manulife Financial LPGA Classic	Ontario	(South Korea) Inbee Park (10)	43	1,500,000	225,000
Jun 22	U.S. Women's Open	North Carolina	(United States) Michelle Wie (4)	100	4,000,000	720,000
Jun 29	Walmart NW Arkansas Championship	Arkansas	(United States) Stacy Lewis (11)	62	2,000,000	300,000
Jul 13	Ricoh Women's British Open	England	(United States) Mo Martin (1)	100	3,000,000	474,575
Jul 20	Marathon Classic	Ohio	(New Zealand) Lydia Ko (4)	37	1,400,000	210,000
Jul 27^	International Crown	Maryland	Spain	n/a	1,600,000	100,000 (Note: Prize for each of the four members of the winning team.)
Aug 10	Meijer LPGA Classic	Michigan	(South Korea) Mirim Lee (1)	53	1,500,000	225,000
Aug 17	Wegmans LPGA Championship	New York	(South Korea) Inbee Park (11)	100	2,250,000	337,500
Aug 24	Canadian Pacific Women's Open	Ontario	(South Korea) So Yeon Ryu (3)	62	2,250,000	337,500
Aug 31	Portland Classic	Oregon	(United States) Austin Ernst (1)	31	1,300,000	195,000
Sep 14	The Evian Championship	France	(South Korea) Kim Hyo-joo (1)	100	3,250,000	487,500
Sep 21	Yokohama Tire LPGA Classic	Alabama	(South Korea) Mi Jung Hur (2)	22	1,300,000	195,000
Oct 5	Reignwood LPGA Classic	China	(South Korea) Mirim Lee (2)	34	2,100,000	315,000
Oct 12	Sime Darby LPGA Malaysia	Malaysia	(China) Shanshan Feng (4)	46	2,000,000	300,000
Oct 19	LPGA KEB-HanaBank Championship	South Korea	(South Korea) Baek Kyu-jung (1)	62	2,000,000	300,000
Oct 27	Blue Bay LPGA	China	(South Africa) Lee-Anne Pace (1)	34	2,000,000	300,000
Nov 2	Fubon LPGA Taiwan Championship	Taiwan	(South Korea) Inbee Park (12)	43	2,000,000	300,000
Nov 9	Mizuno Classic	Japan	(South Korea) Mi Hyang Lee (1)	28	1,200,000	180,000
Nov 16	Lorena Ochoa Invitational	Mexico	(United States) Christina Kim (3)	37	1,000,000	200,000
Nov 23	CME Group Tour Championship	Florida	(New Zealand) Lydia Ko (5)	62	2,000,000	500,000

^ Event held over to Monday, July 27 due to lack of daylight. The event was also shortened to 54 holes.

== Season leaders ==
Money list leaders

Rank	Player	Country	Events	Prize money($)
1	Stacy Lewis	United States	28	2,539,039
2	Inbee Park	South Korea	23	2,226,641
3	Lydia Ko	New Zealand	26	2,089,033
4	Michelle Wie	United States	21	1,924,796
5	So Yeon Ryu	South Korea	25	1,468,804
6	Shanshan Feng	China	24	1,404,623
7	Anna Nordqvist	Sweden	26	1,144,245
8	Karrie Webb	Australia	19	1,069,540
9	Azahara Muñoz	Spain	27	1,051,332
10	Chella Choi	South Korea	31	1,048,932

Full 2014 Official Money List

Scoring average leaders

Rank	Player	Country	Average
1	Stacy Lewis	United States	69.53
2	Inbee Park	South Korea	69.68
3	Michelle Wie	United States	69.82
4	So Yeon Ryu	South Korea	69.98
5	Lydia Ko	New Zealand	70.08

Full 2014 Scoring Average List

== Awards ==
Award	Winner	Country
Money winner	Stacy Lewis	United States
Scoring leader (Vare Trophy)	Stacy Lewis (2)	United States
Player of the Year	Stacy Lewis (2)	United States
Rookie of the Year	Lydia Ko	New Zealand
Race to the CME Globe	Lydia Ko	New Zealand

== See also ==
- 2014 Ladies European Tour
- 2014 Symetra Tour
