= Yokohama Tire LPGA Classic =

Golf tournament

Coordinates: 32.444°N 86.396°W

Tournament information
- Location: Prattville, Alabama, U.S.
- Established: 2007, nineteen years ago
- Courses: Robert Trent Jones Golf Trail, Capitol Hill, Senator Course
- Par: 72
- Length: 6,607 yards (6,041 m)
- Tour: LPGA Tour
- Format: Stroke play - 72 holes
- Prize fund: $1.3 million
- Final year: 2016

Tournament record score
- Aggregate: 267 Mi Jung Hur (2014)
- To par: −21 Mi Jung Hur (2014)

Final champion
- (Thailand) Ariya Jutanugarn

Location in the United States
Location in Alabama

The Yokohama Tire LPGA Classic was a women's professional golf tournament on the LPGA Tour. The 72-hole event made its debut nineteen years ago in September 2007 at the Capitol Hill location on the Robert Trent Jones Golf Trail in Prattville, Alabama, a suburb northwest of Montgomery. Maria Hjorth won the inaugural event on the Senator Course by one stroke over Stacy Prammanasudh.

Top-ranked Lorena Ochoa then won consecutive titles, in a playoff in 2008 and by four strokes in 2009. Katherine Hull won in 2010 by a single stroke and set the tournament scoring record at 269 (−19).

The event saw the then youngest-ever winner of an LPGA event in 2011, with Lexi Thompson's five-stroke victory at age 16. (Amateur Lydia Ko lowered the record to age 15 in 2012 in Canada.) In 2012, Stacy Lewis won her third event of the season by two strokes over Thompson, who carded a 63 (−9) on Thursday, but had a 74 (+2) on Saturday.

The Senator Course at RTJ Capitol Hill converted its greens from bent grass to Champion Bermuda grass in the summer of 2011. The title sponsor was Navistar International, a manufacturer of commercial trucks, engines, and school buses. Following the 2012 event, it elected not to continue as title sponsor, and the tournament was dropped from the schedule in 2013. The tournament reappeared in 2014 when the Yokohama Tire Corporation took over as the title sponsor.

Formerly played later in the season, it was moved up in the schedule to May in 2016. The LPGA Tour event in Mobile, last played as the Airbus LPGA Classic in 2014, was held in May at an RTJ Golf Trail course.

== Tournament names ==
- 2007: Navistar LPGA Classic
- 2008: Navistar LPGA Classic Presented by MaxxForce
- 2009–2011: Navistar LPGA Classic Presented by Monaco RV
- 2012: Navistar LPGA Classic
- 2014–2016: Yokohama Tire LPGA Classic

== Course layout ==
Capitol Hill, Senator Course (2014)

Hole	1	2	3	4	5	6	7	8	9	Out	10	11	12	13	14	15	16	17	18	In	Total
Yards	370	165	390	369	540	385	174	507	376	3,276	547	400	391	163	363	389	152	515	411	3,331	6,607
Par	4	3	4	4	5	4	3	5	4	36	5	4	4	3	4	4	3	5	4	36	72

== Winners ==
Year	Dates	Champion	Country	Winning score	To par	Margin of victory	Purse ($)	Winner's share ($)
2016	May 5–8	Ariya Jutanugarn	Thailand	70-69-63-72=274	−14	1 stroke	1,300,000	195,000
2015	Aug 27–30	Kris Tamulis	United States	71-68-67-65=271	−17	1 stroke	1,300,000	195,000
2014	Sep 18–21	Mi Jung Hur	South Korea	64-70-67-66=267	−21	4 strokes	1,300,000	195,000
2013	No tournament							
2012	Sep 20–23	Stacy Lewis	United States	66-70-65-69=270	−18	2 strokes	1,300,000	195,000
2011	Sep 15–18	Lexi Thompson^{1}	United States	66-68-67-70=271	−17	5 strokes	1,300,000	195,000
2010	Oct 7–10	Katherine Hull	Australia	68-67-67-67=269	−19	1 stroke	1,300,000	195,000
2009	Oct 1–4	Lorena Ochoa (2)	Mexico	66-68-66-70=270	−18	4 strokes	1,300,000	195,000
2008	Sep 25–28	Lorena Ochoa	Mexico	67-67-69-70=273	−15	Playoff ^{2}	1,400,000	210,000
2007	Sep 27–30	Maria Hjorth	Sweden	70-67-70-67=274	−14	1 stroke	1,300,000	195,000

^{1} Thompson, age 16, was not an LPGA member at the time of this win in 2011.
^{2} Won in a three-player sudden-death playoff in 2008 on the second extra hole.

== Tournament records ==
Year	Player	Score	Round
2007	Stacy Prammanasudh	63 (−9)	1st
2007	Amy Hung	63 (−9)	4th
2007	Angela Park	63 (−9)	4th
2009	Yani Tseng	63 (−9)	2nd
2010	Mika Miyazato	63 (−9)	2nd
2010	Lindsey Wright	63 (−9)	4th
2012	Lexi Thompson	63 (−9)	1st
2016	Ariya Jutanugarn	63 (−9)	3rd
