= Sime Darby LPGA Malaysia =

Golf tournament formerly on the LPGA Tour

Coordinates: 3.139°N 101.640°E

Tournament information
- Location: Kuala Lumpur, Malaysia
- Established: 2010
- Courses: Kuala Lumpur Golf & Country Club
- Par: 71
- Length: 6,208 yards (5,677 m)
- Tour: LPGA Tour
- Format: Stroke play - 72 holes
- Prize fund: $1.8 million
- Month played: October
- Final year: 2017

Tournament record score
- Aggregate: 265 Lexi Thompson (2014)
- To par: −19 Lexi Thompson (2014)

Final champion
- (United States) Cristie Kerr

Location in Malaysia

The Sime Darby LPGA Malaysia was a women's professional golf tournament on the LPGA Tour. It was played for the first time in October 2010 at the East Course at Kuala Lumpur Golf & Country Club in Kuala Lumpur, Malaysia.

The title sponsor was Sime Darby, Malaysia's leading multinational conglomerate involved in five core sectors: plantations, property, industrial, motors, and energy and utilities, with a growing presence in healthcare.

The debut tournament was a limited field event with 50 players invited from the official LPGA money list and an additional ten invited sponsor exemptions, including two ASEAN nations local qualifiers. A 54-hole event with no cut, all 60 players played for the entire tournament. The purse was $1.8 million.

The event was increased to 72 holes in 2011, with a no-cut field of 72 players. The purse was increased to $1.9 million.

== Course layout ==
Hole	1	2	3	4	5	6	7	8	9	Out	10	11	12	13	14	15	16	17	18	In	Total
Yards	366	409	393	348	178	471	168	388	410	3,131	341	393	496	286	342	136	521	157	390	3,062	6,193
Par	4	4	4	4	3	5	3	4	4	35	4	4	5	4	4	3	5	3	4	36	71

== Winners ==
Year	Dates	Champion	Country	Winning score	To par	Margin of victory	Runner-up	Purse ($)	Winner's share ($)
2017	26–29 Oct	Cristie Kerr	United States	70-63-65-71=269	−15	1 stroke	(United States) Jacqui Concolino (China) Shanshan Feng (United States) Danielle Kang	1,800,000	270,000
2016	27–30 Oct	Shanshan Feng	China	66-70-64-67=267	−17	3 strokes	(Norway) Suzann Pettersen	1,800,000	270,000
2015	8–11 Oct	Jessica Korda	United States	69-67-65-65=266	−18	4 strokes	(China) Shanshan Feng (New Zealand) Lydia Ko (United States) Stacy Lewis	2,000,000	300,000
2014	9–12 Oct	Shanshan Feng	China	67-67-69-63=266	−18	3 strokes	(Thailand) Pornanong Phatlum	2,000,000	300,000
2013	10–13 Oct	Lexi Thompson	United States	67-63-66-69=265	−19	4 strokes	(China) Shanshan Feng	2,000,000	300,000
2012	11–14 Oct	Inbee Park	South Korea	69-68-65-67=269	−15	2 strokes	(South Korea) Na Yeon Choi	1,900,000	285,000
2011	13–16 Oct	Na Yeon Choi	South Korea	66-68-67-68=269	−15	1 stroke	(Taiwan) Yani Tseng	1,900,000	285,000
2010	22–24 Oct	Jimin Kang	South Korea	70-69-65=204	−9	1 stroke	(United States) Juli Inkster	1,800,000	270,000

== Tournament records ==
Year	Player	Score	Round
2013	Amy Yang	62 (−9)	2nd
