= 2015 Solheim Cup =

Women's team golf competition

- Dates: 18–20 September 2015
- Venue: Golf Club St. Leon-Rot, St. Leon Course
- Location: St. Leon-Rot, Baden-Württemberg, Germany
- Captains: Carin Koch (Europe); Juli Inkster (USA)
(Europe)	13 1/2	14 1/2	(United States)
- United States wins the Solheim Cup

Location map
- Location within Europe Location within Germany

The 2015 Solheim Cup was the 14th edition of the Solheim Cup matches, held 18–20 September at the St. Leon course of Golf Club St. Leon-Rot, St. Leon-Rot, Baden-Württemberg, Germany. The Solheim Cup is a biennial team competition between the top women professional golfers from Europe and the United States. It is a three-day match play event between teams of twelve players with a similar format to the Ryder Cup.

The United States won by a score of 14 1/2 to 13 1/2; the closest score in the history of the Cup.

== Course layout ==
Hole	1	2	3	4	5	6	7	8	9	Out	10	11	12	13	14	15	16	17	18	In	Total
Yards	419	451	167	430	184	492	347	399	424	3,313	388	485	158	262	380	162	602	427	415	3,279	6,592
Par	4	5	3	4	3	5	4	4	4	36	4	5	3	4	4	3	5	4	4	36	72

== Format ==
The Solheim Cup is a match play event, with each match worth one point. The format is as follows:

- Day 1 (Friday): Four foursome (alternate shot) matches in a morning session and four fourball (better ball) matches in an afternoon session. A total of eight players from each team participate in each session.
- Day 2 (Saturday): Four foursome matches in a morning session and four fourball matches in an afternoon session. A total of eight players from each team participate in each session.
- Day 3 (Sunday): 12 singles matches. All 12 players from each team participate.

With a total of 28 points, 14 1/2 points are required to win the Cup, and 14 points are required for the defending champion to retain the Cup. All matches are played to a maximum of 18 holes. If the score is even after 18 holes, each team earns one-half point.

== Team qualification and selection ==
=== Eligibility criteria ===
The European and United States teams had different eligibility criteria:

Team Europe
Members of the European team must:

1. be current members of the Ladies European Tour in any category or membership;
2. have played in six Ranking Events during the Qualifying Period as a member of the LET, unless selected as a Captain's pick (provided she is otherwise eligible);
3. must be a "European national", defined by Solheim Cup rules as someone:

Either:
(i) born in a European country; and
(ii) holding a current passport of that European country;
Or:
(i) having been naturalised as a citizen of a European country;
(ii) having held a current passport of that European country for the immediately preceding four consecutive years;
(iii) having resided in that European country for the immediately preceding four consecutive years.

A European country is a nation situated in the continent of Europe and is recognised as an independent state by the United Nations.

Any player who holds dual nationality (of which one shall be the nationality of a European country) shall elect on joining the LET in each of 2013 and 2014 whether she wishes to be eligible for selection for the 2015 European Solheim Cup Team.

Team USA
Members of the United States team must be current members of the LPGA Tour and meet one of these three citizenship criteria:

- U.S. citizens by birth, regardless of their birthplace.
- Those who were naturalized as U.S. citizens before age 18.
- Those who became U.S. citizens by adoption before age 13.

=== Team selection ===
The European and United States teams were selected by different methods.

Team Europe
Team Europe consists of the top four players from the LET Solheim Cup standings, followed by the top four LET members on the Women's World Golf Rankings as of 24 August who were not already qualified via the Solheim Cup standings, and four captain's selections. Qualifying points for Team Europe were awarded weekly to the top-10 finishers at official LET events.

Team USA
Team USA qualifies by earning points for wins and for top-20 finishes on the LPGA Tour over a two-year period. Points were earned beginning with the 2013 CN Canadian Women's Open (25 August) and concluding with the 2015 Canadian Pacific Women's Open (23 August). Points were increased in 2015 and doubled in the five major championships. The eight players with the highest points are automatically selected for Team USA. Two additional players will qualify based on their position in the Rolex Women's World Golf Rankings and two were selected as wildcards by the team captain from among all eligible players.

== Teams ==
Team Europe
Player	Country	Age	Points rank	Rolex ranking	Previous appearances	Matches	W–L–H	Winning percentage
Carin Koch	Sweden	44	Non-playing captain					
Sophie Gustafson	Sweden	41	Non-playing assistant captain					
Maria McBride	Sweden	41	Non-playing assistant captain					
Annika Sörenstam	Sweden	46	Non-playing assistant captain					
Suzann Pettersen	Norway	34	1	7	7	29	14–9–6	58.62
Gwladys Nocera	France	40	2	63	3	10	5–3–2	60.00
Charley Hull	England	19	3	45	1	3	2–1–0	66.67
Melissa Reid	England	27	4	77	1	4	1–3–0	25.00
Anna Nordqvist	Sweden	28	5	10	3	12	6–5–1	54.17
Azahara Muñoz	Spain	27	10	23	2	8	4–3–1	56.25
Sandra Gal	Germany	30	34	43	1	3	0–2–1	16.67
Carlota Ciganda	Spain	25	6	52	1	3	3–0–0	100.00
Catriona Matthew	Scotland	46	18	53	7	29	12–9–8	55.17
Karine Icher	France	36	24	57	2	7	3–3–1	50.00
Caroline Masson	Germany	26	17	71	1	4	2–1–1	62.50
Caroline Hedwall	Sweden	26	47	107	2	9	7–1–1	83.33

Age at the start of the 2015 Solheim Cup matches on 18 September 2015. Reid had her 28th birthday on the second day.
Rolex rankings as of the date of team selection on 25 August 2015.
Maria McBride played in the Solheim Cup as Maria Hjorth.

Team USA
Player	Age	Points rank	Rolex ranking	Previous appearances	Matches	W–L–H	Winning percentage
Juli Inkster	55	Non-playing captain					
Pat Hurst	46	Non-playing assistant captain					
Nancy Lopez	58	Non-playing assistant captain					
Wendy Ward	42	Non-playing assistant captain					
Stacy Lewis	30	1	3	2	8	2–5–1	31.25
Lexi Thompson	20	2	8	1	3	1–2–0	33.33
Cristie Kerr	37	3	14	7	30	12–14–4	46.67
Michelle Wie	25	4	20	3	12	6–5–1	54.17
Brittany Lincicome	29	5	13	4	14	5–7–2	42.86
Morgan Pressel	27	6	24	4	15	8–5–2	60.00
Angela Stanford	37	7	33	5	17	3–11–3	26.47
Gerina Piller	30	8	38	1	3	0–2–1	16.67
Alison Lee	20	15	29	0	Rookie		
Lizette Salas	26	9	32	1	3	0–1–2	33.33
Brittany Lang	30	10	42	3	11	5–4–2	54.55
Paula Creamer	29	11	40	5	23	12–6–5	63.04

Age at the start of the 2015 Solheim Cup matches on 18 September 2015. Lincicome turned 30 on 19 September.
Rolex rankings as of the date of team selection on 25 August 2015.

== Day one ==
Friday, 18 September – Saturday, 19 September, 2015

=== Morning foursomes ===
The opening match was all square after six holes. The USA team of Pressel and Creamer then won four of the next seven holes and went on to win the match 3 & 2. The second match alternated between all-square and 1-up for the European team of Hull and Reid through 16 holes. A birdie on the 17th sealed Europe's 2 & 1 win. The USA team of Kerr and Thompson led the third match throughout, extending the lead to 4-up by the sixth hole. Three birdies in a row on holes 13-15 by the European team of Icher and Muñoz closed the gap to 1-up before the USA team birdied the 17th hole to secure a 2 & 1 win. In the fourth match, the USA team of Lewis and Salas got off to a 1-up lead after two holes but the European team of Gal and Matthew pulled ahead, winning six of the next 14 holes to the USA team's two to win the match 3 & 2.

	Results
Pressel/Creamer	(United States) 3 & 2	Nordqvist/Pettersen
Wie/Lincicome	(Europe) 2 & 1	Hull/Reid
Kerr/Thompson	(United States) 2 & 1	Icher/Muñoz
Lewis/Salas	(Europe) 3 & 2	Gal/Matthew
2	Session	2
2	Overall	2

=== Afternoon four-ball ===
Europe's Nordqvist and Hedwall led the first match from the second hole on the way to a 4 & 3 victory; The USA team of Pressel and Creamer won only one hole in the match. Europe's Hull and Nocera were never behind in their match. A run of four birdies in five holes saw them take a 4-hole lead on the 12th. They closed out the match by a 3 & 2 margin on the 16th hole having been dormie three. Play had been suspended at about 4:30 pm CET because of a thunderstorm and, although play resumed an hour later at 5:30 pm, there was not enough daylight to complete the final two matches. Play was suspended 7:47 pm and resumed the following day at 7:45 am. After resuming Melissa Reid and Lexi Thompson both had birdies on the 18th to ensure that the third match was halved. In the anchor match Gerina Piller and Brittany Lang fought from a one-hole deficit back to secure a half a point.

	Results
Pressel/Creamer	(Europe) 4 & 3	Nordqvist/Hedwall
Lee/Stanford	(Europe) 3 & 2	Hull/Nocera
Kerr/Thompson	halved	Reid/Ciganda
Piller/Lang	halved	Masson/Gal
1	Session	3
3	Overall	5

== Day two ==
Saturday, 19 – Sunday, 20 September 2015

=== Morning foursomes ===
Because of the delay the previous day, the foursomes did not start until 9:15 am. Reid and Ciganda were never behind in their match and closed it out 4 & 3 on the 15th hole. In the second match Hull and Pettersen were 4 down to Creamer and Pressel before a run of birdies from the 12th hole saw the European team make the match all-square on the 17th hole. Pettersen holed the putt for the win on the 18th. Gal and Matthew always had a lead in the third match but it became a very tight affair and Stanford and Lincicome brought them to the 18th hole with Europe 1-up. The teams halved the 18th with fours to give Europe the win. In the anchor match, the American pairing of Lewis and Piller regained a one-hole lead at the 7th hole and eventually defeated the all-Swedish duo of Nordqvist and Hedwall by a 5 & 4 margin on the 14th hole.

	Results
Lee/Wie	(Europe) 4 & 3	Reid/Ciganda
Creamer/Pressel	(Europe) 1 up	Hull/Pettersen
Stanford/Lincicome	(Europe) 1 up	Gal/Matthew
Lewis/Piller	(United States) 5 & 4	Nordqvist/Hedwall
1	Session	3
4	Overall	8

=== Afternoon four-ball ===
Match 4 (Lewis/Piller v. Masson/Hedwall) started before Matches 2 and 3. The table below reflects the official order. Play was suspended at 7:40 pm because of darkness and resumed on Sunday.

The match between Pettersen/Hull and Lee/Lincicome generated some controversy. On the 17th green, with the match all square, Lee missed a putt to win the hole. Taking for granted that the next 18-inch putt was conceded, she picked up her ball. However, Pettersen pointed out that it was not conceded, and the Europeans won the hole. The European team captain Carin Koch and vice captain Annika Sörenstam tried to convince Pettersen to change her mind and concede the putt, but as it was a fact that Lee had picked up her ball without the putt being given to her, it wasn't a possibility within the rules of golf, to agree on another outcome of the hole and change the sequence of events afterwards. Pettersen/Hull eventually won the match and Europe took a 10–6 lead going into singles. Pettersen, criticized as unsportsmanlike by USA captain Inkster and European golfer Laura Davies, among others, initially refused to back down from her decision. The following day, Pettersen posted an apology for her actions on Instagram, saying "I've never felt more gutted and truly sad about what went down Sunday on the 17th at the Solheim Cup."

	Results
Thompson/Kerr	(United States) 3 & 2	Muñoz/Ciganda
Salas/Lang	(Europe) 2 & 1	Icher/Matthew
Lee/Lincicome	(Europe) 2 up	Pettersen/Hull
Lewis/Piller	(United States) 1 up	Masson/Hedwall
2	Session	2
6	Overall	10

== Day three ==
Sunday, 20 September 2015

=== Singles ===
The start of the singles matches was delayed until 10:40 am.

Going into singles, the United States trailed 10–6 and needed 8 1/2 more points to win back the Cup. The Americans did just that, with Creamer winning the final match to give the USA a one-point victory. It was the biggest comeback in the history of the Solheim Cup.

	Results
Lexi Thompson	halved	Carlota Ciganda
Morgan Pressel	(United States) 2 up	Catriona Matthew
Brittany Lincicome	(Europe) 3 & 2	Karine Icher
Brittany Lang	(Europe) 2 & 1	Melissa Reid
Alison Lee	(United States) 3 & 1	Gwladys Nocera
Gerina Piller	(United States) 1 up	Caroline Masson
Stacy Lewis	(Europe) 2 & 1	Anna Nordqvist
Lizette Salas	(United States) 3 & 1	Azahara Muñoz
Angela Stanford	(United States) 2 & 1	Suzann Pettersen
Cristie Kerr	(United States) 3 & 2	Charley Hull
Michelle Wie	(United States) 6 & 4	Caroline Hedwall
Paula Creamer	(United States) 4 & 3	Sandra Gal
8 1/2	Session	3 1/2
14 1/2	Overall	13 1/2

== Individual player records ==
Each entry refers to the win–loss–half record of the player.

=== Europe ===
Player	Points	Overall	Singles	Foursomes	Fourballs
Carlota Ciganda	2	1–1–2	0–0–1	1–0–0	0–1–1
Sandra Gal	2.5	2–1–1	0–1–0	2–0–0	0–0–1
Caroline Hedwall	1	1–3–0	0–1–0	0–1–0	1–1–0
Charley Hull	4	4–1–0	0–1–0	2–0–0	2–0–0
Karine Icher	2	2–1–0	1–0–0	0–1–0	1–0–0
Caroline Masson	0.5	0–2–1	0–1–0	0–0–0	0–1–1
Catriona Matthew	3	3–1–0	0–1–0	2–0–0	1–0–0
Azahara Muñoz	0	0–3–0	0–1–0	0–1–0	0–1–0
Gwladys Nocera	1	1–1–0	0–1–0	0–0–0	1–0–0
Anna Nordqvist	2	2–2–0	1–0–0	0–2–0	1–0–0
Suzann Pettersen	2	2–2–0	0–1–0	1–1–0	1–0–0
Melissa Reid	3.5	3–0–1	1–0–0	2–0–0	0–0–1

=== United States ===
Player	Points	Overall	Singles	Foursomes	Fourballs
Paula Creamer	2	2–2–0	1–0–0	1–1–0	0–1–0
Cristie Kerr	3.5	3–0–1	1–0–0	1–0–0	1–0–1
Brittany Lang	0.5	0–2–1	0–1–0	0–0–0	0–1–1
Alison Lee	1	1–3–0	1–0–0	0–1–0	0–2–0
Stacy Lewis	2	2–2–0	0–1–0	1–1–0	1–0–0
Brittany Lincicome	0	0–4–0	0–1–0	0–2–0	0–1–0
Gerina Piller	3.5	3–0–1	1–0–0	1–0–0	1–0–1
Morgan Pressel	2	2–2–0	1–0–0	1–1–0	0–1–0
Lizette Salas	1	1–2–0	1–0–0	0–1–0	0–1–0
Angela Stanford	1	1–2–0	1–0–0	0–1–0	0–1–0
Lexi Thompson	3	2–0–2	0–0–1	1–0–0	1–0–1
Michelle Wie	1	1–2–0	1–0–0	0–2–0	0–0–0
