= Lorena Ochoa Invitational =

Women's professional golf tournament in Mexico on the LPGA Tour

Coordinates: 19.279°N 99.158°W

Lorena Ochoa Match Play

Tournament information
- Location: Mexico City, Mexico
- Established: 2008
- Course: Club de Golf México
- Par: 72
- Length: 6,684 yards (6,112 m)
- Tour: LPGA Tour
- Format: Match play (as of 2017)
- Prize fund: $1.2 million
- Final year: 2017

Tournament record score
- Aggregate: 269 In-Kyung Kim (2010)
- To par: −19 In-Kyung Kim (2010)

Final champion
- (South Korea) Kim Sei-young

Location in Mexico

The Lorena Ochoa Invitational was a women's professional golf tournament in Mexico on the LPGA Tour. Hosted by Lorena Ochoa, the event debuted in November 2008 at the course where she learned to play, Guadalajara Country Club in Guadalajara.

The Lorena Ochoa Invitational was a 72-hole limited-field tournament, limited to 36 golfers. The top five in the Rolex Women's World Rankings were invited, in addition to the top 26 players on the LPGA money list not already in the field via the rankings. Another five players were invited through sponsor exemptions.

In 2014, the tournament moved to the Club de Golf México in Mexico City, a par-72 layout set at 6,684 yards (6,112 m).

In November 2016, it was announced that the event would move to the first week of May in 2017 as a match play event, the Lorena Ochoa Match Play, with a field of 64 players and $1.2 million purse. The event was not included on the 2018 schedule and has not returned.

== Course layout ==
Club de Golf México

Hole	1	2	3	4	5	6	7	8	9	Out	10	11	12	13	14	15	16	17	18	In	Total
Yards	390	453	165	402	189	565	363	403	423	3,353	406	549	407	367	182	396	166	507	351	3,331	6,684
Par	4	5	3	4	3	5	4	4	4	36	4	5	4	4	3	4	3	5	4	36	72

- The approximate elevation of the course is 7,480 feet (2,280 m) above sea level.

== Winners ==
As a match play event

Year	Dates	Champion	Country	Score	Runner-up	Purse ($)	Winner's share ($)
2017	May 4–7	Kim Sei-young	South Korea	1 up	(Thailand) Ariya Jutanugarn	1,200,000	250,000

As a stroke play event

Year	Dates	Champion	Country	Winning score	To par	Margin of victory	Runner(s)-up	Purse ($)	Winner's share ($)
2016	Nov 10–13	Carlota Ciganda	Spain	67-72-68-68=275	−13	2 strokes	(United States) Austin Ernst (England) Jodi Ewart Shadoff (France) Karine Icher (Australia) Sarah Jane Smith (United States) Angela Stanford	1,000,000	200,000
2015	Nov 12–15	Inbee Park	South Korea	68-71-67-64=270	−18	3 strokes	(Spain) Carlota Ciganda	1,000,000	200,000
2014	Nov 13–16	Christina Kim	United States	65-69-68-71=273	−15	Playoff	(China) Shanshan Feng	1,000,000	200,000
2013	Nov 14–17	Lexi Thompson	United States	72-64-67-69=272	−16	1 stroke	(United States) Stacy Lewis	1,000,000	200,000
2012	Nov 8–11	Cristie Kerr	United States	67-69-67-69=272	−16	1 stroke	(South Korea) Inbee Park (United States) Angela Stanford	1,000,000	200,000
2011	Nov 10–13	Catriona Matthew	Scotland	69-68-68-71=276	−12	4 strokes	(South Korea) I.K. Kim (Sweden) Anna Nordqvist	1,000,000	200,000
2010	Nov 11–14	In-Kyung Kim	South Korea	69-68-68-64=269	−19	3 strokes	(Norway) Suzann Pettersen	1,100,000	220,000
2009	Nov 12–15	Michelle Wie	United States	70-66-70-69=275	−13	2 strokes	(United States) Paula Creamer	1,100,000	220,000
2008	Nov 13–16	Angela Stanford	United States	68-66-72-69=275	−13	1 stroke	(United States) Brittany Lang (Sweden) Annika Sörenstam	1,000,000	200,000

== Tournament record ==
Year	Date	Player	Score	Course	Round
2010	Nov 14	(United States) Angela Stanford	63 (−9)	Guadalajara Country Club	4th
2015	Nov 15	(Spain) Carlota Ciganda	63 (−9)	Club de Golf México	4th
