= Kris Tamulis =

American professional golfer (born 1980)

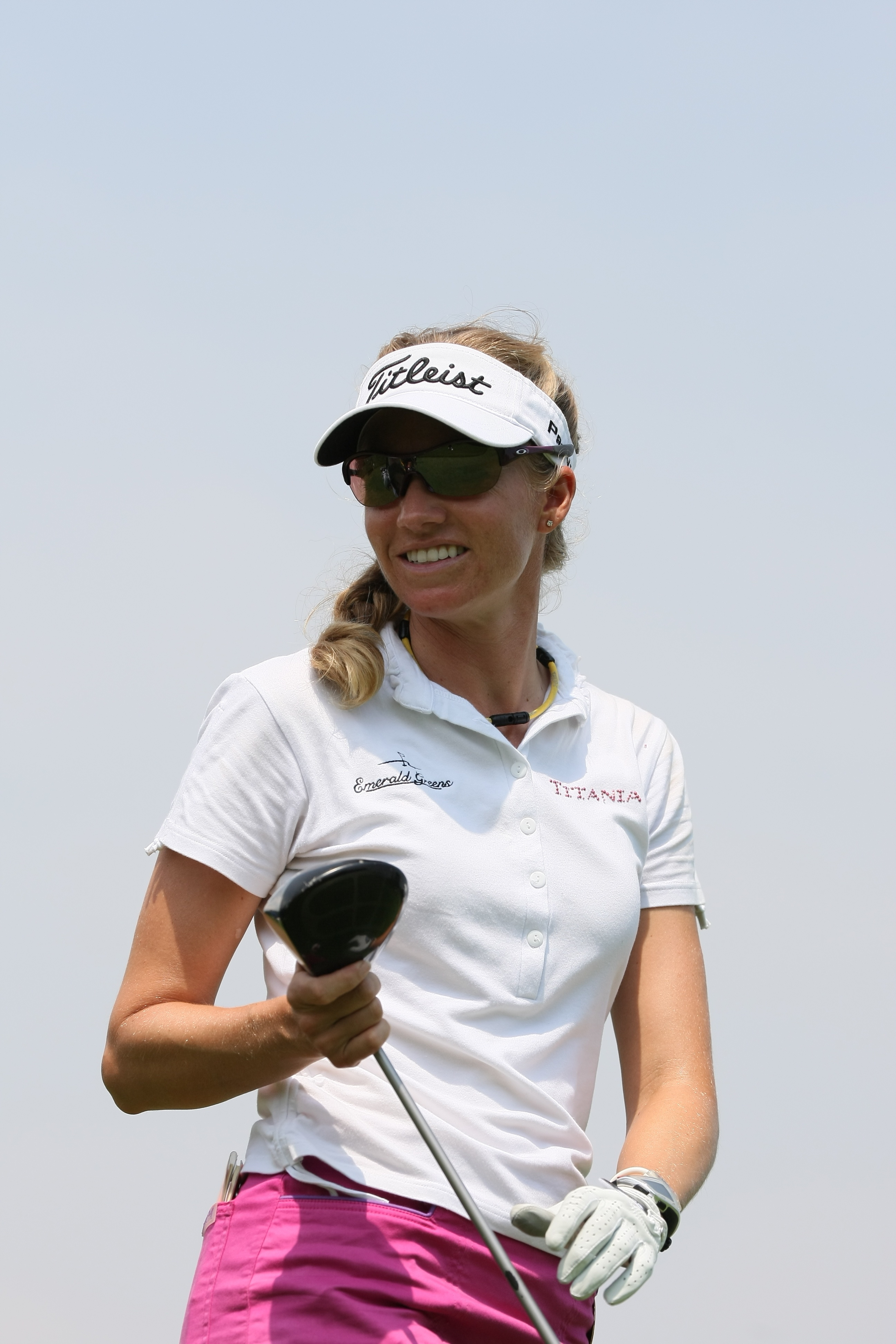
- Tamulis at the 2009 LPGA Championship

Personal information
- Nationality: United States
- Born: December 29, 1980 (age 45) Lapeer, Michigan, U.S.
- Height: 5 ft 7 in (1.70 m)

Career
- Sport: Golf
- College: Florida State
- Turned professional: 2003
- Former tours: LPGA Tour (2005–2024); Futures Tour (2004–2005)
- Professional wins: 1

Number of wins by tour
- LPGA Tour: 1

Best results in LPGA major championships
- Chevron Championship: T36: 2016
- Women's PGA C'ship: T29: 2006
- U.S. Women's Open: T21: 2016
- Women's British Open: T50: 2010
- Evian Championship: T41: 2014

Kris Tamulis (born December 29, 1980) is an American professional golfer.

== Career ==
Tamulis was born in Lapeer, Michigan. She played college golf at Florida State University where she won two events. She turned professional in 2003.

Tamulis played on the Futures Tour in 2004 and 2005, finishing in second place three times. She has played on the LPGA Tour since 2005.

Tamulis won her only LPGA Tour event at the 2015 Yokohama Tire LPGA Classic after 11 years and 186 LPGA Tour starts.

== Professional wins (1) ==
=== LPGA Tour wins (1) ===
No.	Date	Tournament	Winning score	To par	Margin of victory	Runners-up
1	Aug 30, 2015	Yokohama Tire LPGA Classic	71-68-67-65=271	−17	1 stroke	(United States) Austin Ernst (Taiwan) Yani Tseng
