= Airbus LPGA Classic =

Golf tournament

Coordinates: 30.741°N 88.206°W

Tournament information
- Location: Mobile, Alabama, U.S.
- Established: 2008
- Courses: Robert Trent Jones Golf Trail at Magnolia Grove, Crossings Course
- Par: 72
- Length: 6,532 yards (5,973 m)
- Tour: LPGA Tour
- Format: Stroke play - 72 holes
- Prize fund: $1.3 million
- Month played: May
- Final year: 2014

Tournament record score
- Aggregate: 271 Stacy Lewis (2012)
- To par: −17 Stacy Lewis (2012)

Final champion
- (United States) Jessica Korda

Location in the United States
Location in Alabama

The Airbus LPGA Classic was a women's professional golf tournament on the LPGA Tour, played in Mobile, Alabama from 2008 to 2014.

The event debuted in September 2008 at the Magnolia Grove location on the Robert Trent Jones Golf Trail, with total prize money of $1.4 million. Angela Stanford won the inaugural edition by one stroke over Shanshan Feng, which was televised on Golf Channel in the U.S., as well as internationally.

The tournament was not played in 2009, but was revived in 2010 and moved to mid-May. Heavy rains and lightning delayed and ultimately canceled the final round, resulting in a sudden-death playoff between the three 54-hole leaders: Se Ri Pak, Brittany Lincicome, and Suzann Pettersen. Pak birdied the third playoff hole in the drizzle to win. In 2011, Maria Hjorth shot consecutive rounds of 67 (−5) on the weekend to finish at 278 (−10) and win by two strokes. The tournament was dropped for the 2015 season.

In 2008 and 2010, Bell Microproducts was the title sponsor; Avnet purchased Bell Micro in 2010 and was the title sponsor in 2011. Without a title sponsor in 2012, the tournament purse dropped slightly, from $1.30 million to $1.25 million. In January 2014, the LPGA introduced Airbus, the European multinational aerospace and defense corporation, as the event's new title sponsor. The company's new final assembly facility for its A320 aircraft is under construction in Mobile, scheduled to come online in 2015.

Mobile previously hosted The Mitchell Company Tournament of Champions on the Magnolia Grove courses from 1999 to 2007.

== Tournament names ==
- 2008–10: Bell Micro LPGA Classic
- 2011: Avnet LPGA Classic
- 2012–13: Mobile Bay LPGA Classic
- 2014: Airbus LPGA Classic Presented by JTBC

== 2013 course layout ==
Crossings Course

Hole	1	2	3	4	5	6	7	8	9	Out	10	11	12	13	14	15	16	17	18	In	Total
Yards	395	180	387	528	392	488	385	159	370	3,284	380	398	376	522	149	390	466	165	402	3,248	6,532
Par	4	3	4	5	4	5	4	3	4	36	4	4	4	5	3	4	5	3	4	36	72

== Winners ==
Year	Dates	Champion	Country	Winning score	To par	Margin of victory	Purse ($)	Winner's share ($)
2014	May 22–25	Jessica Korda	United States	67-67-69-65=268	−20	1 stroke	1,300,000	195,000
2013	May 16–19	Jennifer Johnson	United States	67-70-65-65=267	−21	1 stroke	1,200,000	180,000
2012	Apr 26–29	Stacy Lewis	United States	68-67-67-68=271	−17	1 stroke	1,250,000	187,500
2011	Apr 28 – May 1	Maria Hjorth	Sweden	70-74-67-67=278	−10	2 strokes	1,300,000	195,000
2010	May 13–16	Se Ri Pak	South Korea	69-66-68=203	−13	Playoff ^{1}	1,300,000	195,000
2009	No tournament							
2008	Sep 11–14	Angela Stanford	United States	70-67-67-73=277	−11	1 stroke	1,400,000	210,000

^{1} Final round was canceled because of rain and weather delays. Third round co-leaders Pak, Brittany Lincicome, and Suzann Pettersen played a sudden-death playoff to determine the winner; Pak won on the third playoff hole.

== Tournament records ==
Year	Player	Score	Round
2013	Anna Nordqvist	61 (−11)	3rd
