= 2014 Kraft Nabisco Championship =

Coordinates: 33.798°N 116.433°W

Tournament information
- Dates: April 3–6, 2014
- Location: Rancho Mirage, California
- Courses: Mission Hills Country Club; Dinah Shore Tournament Course
- Tour: LPGA Tour
- Format: Stroke play - 72 holes

Statistics
- Par: 72
- Length: 6,738 yards (6,161 m)
- Field: 111 players, 73 after cut
- Cut: 149 (+5)
- Prize fund: $2.0 million
- Winner's share: $300,000

Champion
- (United States) Lexi Thompson
- 274 (−14)

The 2014 Kraft Nabisco Championship was the 43rd Kraft Nabisco Championship, held April 3–6 at the Dinah Shore Tournament Course of Mission Hills Country Club in Rancho Mirage, California. It was the 32nd year of the tournament as a major championship. Golf Channel televised the event.

Lexi Thompson, age 19, shot a bogey-free final round 68 (−4) to win her first major title, three strokes ahead of runner-up Michelle Wie. The two entered the final round as co-leaders at 206 (−10). Thompson opened with a birdie, carded a 32 (−4) on the front nine, then finished with nine consecutive pars. Wie won the next major, the U.S. Women's Open in June, for her first major title.

== Field ==
The field of 111 players included 10 amateurs.

Location in the United States

== Round summaries ==
=== First round ===
Thursday, April 3, 2014

Place	Player	Score	To par
1	(China) Shanshan Feng	66	−6
T2	(South Korea) Se Ri Pak	67	−5
T2	(United States) Michelle Wie	67	−5
T4	(South Korea) Amy Yang	68	−4
T4	(United States) Angel Yin (a)	68	−4
T6	(United States) Cristie Kerr	69	−3
T6	(Philippines) Jennifer Rosales	69	−3
T6	(South Korea) Jiyai Shin	69	−3
T9	(South Korea) Chella Choi	70	−2
T9	(United States) Tiffany Joh	70	−2
T9	(South Korea) Haeji Kang	70	−2
T9	(United States) Morgan Pressel	70	−2
T9	(South Korea) So Yeon Ryu	70	−2

(a) = amateur

=== Second round ===
Friday, April 4, 2014

73 players made the cut at 149 (+5).

Place	Player	Score	To par
T1	(South Korea) Se Ri Pak	67-70=137	−7
T1	(United States) Lexi Thompson	73-64=137	−7
3	(United States) Michelle Wie	67-71=138	−6
T4	(China) Shanshan Feng	66-73=139	−5
T4	(United States) Cristie Kerr	69-70=139	−5
T6	(Scotland) Catriona Matthew	72-68=140	−4
T6	(Sweden) Anna Nordqvist	71-69=140	−4
T6	(United States) Morgan Pressel	70-70=140	−4
T9	(United States) Mo Martin	73-68=141	−3
T9	(South Korea) Amy Yang	68-73=141	−3

=== Third round ===
Saturday, April 5, 2014

Place	Player	Score	To par
T1	(United States) Lexi Thompson	73-64-69=206	−10
T1	(United States) Michelle Wie	67-71-68=206	−10
T3	(England) Charley Hull	73-69-66=208	−8
T3	(South Korea) Se Ri Pak	67-70-71=208	−8
T4	(United States) Cristie Kerr	69-70-71=210	−6
T4	(Scotland) Catriona Matthew	72-68-70=210	−6
T7	(South Korea) Chella Choi	70-72-69=211	−5
T7	(China) Shanshan Feng	66-73-72=211	−5
T9	(United States) Stacy Lewis	73-70-69=212	−4
T9	(Spain) Azahara Muñoz	72-70-70=212	−4
T9	(United States) Gerina Piller	77-65-70=212	−4
T9	(South Korea) Jiyai Shin	69-73-70=212	−4
T9	(United States) Angela Stanford	74-69-69=212	−4
T9	(South Korea) Amy Yang	68-73-71=212	−4

=== Final round ===
Sunday, April 6, 2014

Place	Player	Score	To par	Money ($)
1	(United States) Lexi Thompson	73-64-69-68=274	−14	300,000
2	(United States) Michelle Wie	67-71-68-71=277	−11	187,584
3	(United States) Stacy Lewis	73-70-69-69=281	−7	136,079
T4	(United States) Cristie Kerr	69-70-71-72=282	−6	94,998
T4	(South Korea) Se Ri Pak	67-70-71-74=282	−6	94,998
6	(China) Shanshan Feng	66-73-72-72=283	−5	69,323
T7	(United States) Angela Stanford	74-69-69-72=284	−4	51,522
T7	(Spain) Azahara Muñoz	72-70-70-72=284	−4	51,522
T7	(England) Charley Hull	73-69-66-76=284	−4	51,522
10	(South Korea) Amy Yang	68-73-71-73=285	−3	41,594

Amateurs: Minjee Lee (E), Brooke Henderson (+1), Alison Lee (+2), Lilia Vu (+6), Su-Hyun Oh (+7), Angel Yin (+14).

==== Scorecard ====
Final round

Hole	1	2	3	4	5	6	7	8	9	10	11	12	13	14	15	16	17	18
Par	4	5	4	4	3	4	4	3	5	4	5	4	4	3	4	4	3	5
(United States) Thompson	−11	−11	−11	−12	−13	−13	−13	−13	−14	−14	−14	−14	−14	−14	−14	−14	−14	−14
(United States) Wie	−10	−11	−10	−10	−10	−10	−10	−9	−9	−9	−10	−10	−10	−11	−11	−10	−11	−11
(United States) Lewis	−4	−5	−5	−5	−6	−6	−6	−5	−6	−6	−6	−6	−6	−6	−6	−6	−6	−7
(United States) Kerr	−6	−6	−6	−6	−6	−6	−6	−6	−6	−7	−7	−6	−5	−5	−5	−5	−5	−6
(South Korea) Pak	−9	−9	−9	−9	−9	−10	−10	−10	−9	−9	−9	−9	−9	−9	−8	−8	−8	−6
