= 2014 LPGA Championship =

Tournament information
- Dates: August 14–17, 2014
- Location: Pittsford, New York, U.S. 43.096°N 77.496°W
- Course: Monroe Golf Club
- Organized by: LPGA
- Tour: LPGA Tour
- Format: Stroke play - 72 holes

Statistics
- Par: 72
- Length: 6,717 yards (6,142 m)
- Field: 150 players, 73 after cut
- Cut: 146 (+2)
- Prize fund: $2.25 million
- Winner's share: $337,500

Champion
- (South Korea) Inbee Park
- 277 (−11), playoff
- Location in the United States Location in New York

The 2014 LPGA Championship was the 60th LPGA Championship, held August 14–17 at Monroe Golf Club in Pittsford, New York, a suburb southeast of Rochester. Known for sponsorship reasons as the Wegmans LPGA Championship, it was the fourth of five major championships on the LPGA Tour during the 2014 season. This was the first LPGA Championship played at Monroe Golf Club, after four years at nearby Locust Hill Country Club.

Defending champion Inbee Park won her second LPGA Championship, defeating runner-up Brittany Lincicome on the first hole of a sudden-death playoff for her fifth major title. Park was the first to win consecutive LPGA Championship titles in nine years, last accomplished by Annika Sörenstam, who won her third straight in 2005. Park's win the previous year at Locust Hill was also in a playoff.

This was the final year as the LPGA Championship, which became the "KPMG Women's PGA Championship" in 2015, conducted by the PGA of America.

== Course ==
The course was designed by Donald Ross and opened 102 years ago in 1924.

Hole	1	2	3	4	5	6	7	8	9	Out	10	11	12	13	14	15	16	17	18	In	Total
Yards	396	381	465	406	431	207	392	145	516	3,339	423	414	480	183	488	360	193	415	422	3,378	6,717
Par	4	4	5	4	4	3	4	3	5	36	4	4	5	3	5	4	3	4	4	36	72

== Field ==
The field included 150 players, including one amateur, from 28 countries.

== Round summaries ==
=== First round ===
Thursday, August 14, 2014

Place	Player	Score	To par
T1	(South Korea) Meena Lee	66	−6
T1	(United States) Lexi Thompson	66	−6
T3	(Canada) Jennifer Kirby	67	−5
T3	(United States) Brittany Lincicome	67	−5
T3	(Colombia) Lisa McCloskey	67	−5
T6	(China) Shanshan Feng	68	−4
T6	(United States) Cristie Kerr	68	−4
T8	(United States) Emma Jandel	69	−3
T8	(South Korea) Eun-hee Ji	69	−3
T8	(South Korea) Ilhee Lee	69	−3
T8	(South Korea) Mirim Lee	69	−3
T8	(Scotland) Catriona Matthew	69	−3
T8	(Sweden) Anna Nordqvist	69	−3
T8	(United States) Brooke Pancake	69	−3
T8	(United States) Angela Stanford	69	−3

=== Second round ===
Friday, August 15, 2014

Place	Player	Score	To par
1	(United States) Brittany Lincicome	67-68=135	−9
T2	(South Korea) Inbee Park	72-66=138	−6
T2	(United States) Lexi Thompson	66-72=138	−6
T4	(New Zealand) Lydia Ko	70-69=139	−5
T4	(South Korea) Meena Lee	66-73=139	−5
T4	(United States) Jane Park	70-69=139	−5
T7	(China) Shanshan Feng	68-72=140	−4
T7	(Paraguay) Julieta Granada	75-65=140	−4
T7	(United States) Jennifer Johnson	70-70=140	−4
T7	(South Korea) Mirim Lee	69-71=140	−4
T7	(Norway) Suzann Pettersen	71-69=140	−4
T7	(Spain) Beatriz Recari	70-70=140	−4

=== Third round ===
Saturday, August 16, 2014

Place	Player	Score	To par
1	(United States) Brittany Lincicome	67-68-71=206	−10
T2	(South Korea) Inbee Park	72-66-69=207	−9
T2	(Norway) Suzann Pettersen	71-69-67=207	−9
4	(South Korea) Mirim Lee	69-71-69=209	−7
T5	(New Zealand) Lydia Ko	70-69-71=210	−6
T5	(South Korea) Meena Lee	66-73-71=210	−6
T5	(United States) Gerina Piller	72-69-69=210	−6
T8	(China) Shanshan Feng	68-72-71=211	−5
T8	(Sweden) Anna Nordqvist	69-73-69=211	−5
T8	(United States) Jane Park	70-69-72=211	−5

=== Final round ===
Sunday, August 17, 2014

Place	Player	Score	To par	Money ($)
T1	(South Korea) Inbee Park	72-66-69-70=277	−11	Playoff
T1	(United States) Brittany Lincicome	67-68-71-71=277	−11	Playoff
3	(New Zealand) Lydia Ko	70-69-71-70=280	−8	150,737
T4	(Spain) Azahara Muñoz	71-70-71-70=282	−6	105,231
T4	(Sweden) Anna Nordqvist	69-73-69-71=282	−6	105,231
T6	(China) Shanshan Feng	68-72-71-72=283	−5	58,816
T6	(Paraguay) Julieta Granada	75-65-72-71=283	−5	58,816
T6	(South Korea) Mirim Lee	69-71-69-74=283	−5	58,816
T6	(United States) Stacy Lewis	71-73-71-68=283	−5	58,816
T6	(Norway) Suzann Pettersen	71-69-67-76=283	−5	58,816

==== Scorecard ====
Final round

Hole	1	2	3	4	5	6	7	8	9	10	11	12	13	14	15	16	17	18
Par	4	4	5	4	4	3	4	3	5	4	4	5	3	5	4	3	4	4
(South Korea) Park	−9	−9	−9	−10	−10	−10	−9	−9	−9	−9	−9	−10	−10	−10	−10	−10	−11	−11
(United States) Lincicome	−10	−10	−11	−11	−11	−10	−10	−11	−11	−11	−12	−11	−11	−12	−12	−12	−12	−11
(New Zealand) Ko	−6	−6	−7	−7	−7	−6	−6	−7	−8	−7	−7	−8	−8	−9	−10	−10	−9	−8
(Spain) Muñoz	−5	−5	−6	−6	−6	−5	−6	−6	−6	−7	−8	−9	−9	−9	−9	−7	−7	−6
(Sweden) Nordqvist	−5	−5	−5	−5	−6	−5	−5	−5	−6	−7	−7	−7	−7	−8	−8	−7	−6	−6
(China) Feng	−5	−5	−5	−5	−5	−5	−5	−5	−5	−5	−5	−5	−5	−5	−5	−4	−5	−5
(Paraguay) Granada	−3	−3	−4	−4	−4	−4	−4	−4	−5	−5	−5	−5	−6	−7	−7	−6	−6	−5
(South Korea) Lee	−7	−7	−7	−6	−6	−6	−6	−6	−7	−7	−7	−8	−7	−6	−5	−6	−5	−5
(United States) Lewis	−1	−1	−2	−2	−2	−2	−2	−1	−1	−1	−1	−2	−3	−4	−4	−5	−5	−5
(Norway) Pettersen	−7	−7	−7	−6	−6	−5	−5	−4	−4	−4	−4	−4	−4	−5	−6	−6	−6	−5

Cumulative tournament scores, relative to par

==== Playoff ====
The sudden-death playoff lasted one hole, played on the 422-yard (386 m) par-4 18th hole. Both players missed the green with their approach shots and had chip shots. Lincicome missed her putt for par from six feet (1.8 m) while Park made her 3-footer (0.9 m) to win her second straight LPGA Championship.

Place	Player	Score	To par	Money ($)
1	(South Korea) Inbee Park	4	E	337,500
2	(United States) Brittany Lincicome	5	+1	207,791
