= 2015 ANA Inspiration =

Golf tournament

Coordinates: 33.798°N 116.433°W

Tournament information
- Dates: April 2–5, 2015
- Location: Rancho Mirage, California
- Courses: Mission Hills Country Club; Dinah Shore Tournament Course
- Tour: LPGA Tour
- Format: Stroke play - 72 holes

Statistics
- Par: 72
- Length: 6,769 yards (6,190 m)
- Field: 115 players, 73 after cut
- Cut: 147 (+3)
- Prize fund: $2.5 million
- Winner's share: $375,000

Champion
- (United States) Brittany Lincicome
- 279 (−9), playoff

Location in the United States
Location in California

The 2015 ANA Inspiration was the 44th ANA Inspiration, held April 2–5 on the Dinah Shore Tournament Course at Mission Hills Country Club in Rancho Mirage, California. The tournament was in its first year with All Nippon Airways (ANA) as the title sponsor and its 33rd year as a major championship. 2009 champion Brittany Lincicome eagled the 72nd hole to force a playoff, then defeated Stacy Lewis on the third extra hole to win her second major title. Golf Channel televised the event.

== Field ==
Players who qualified for the event are listed below. Players are listed under the first category in which they qualified; additional qualifying categories are shown in parentheses.

1. Active LPGA Tour Hall of Fame members (must have participated in ten official LPGA Tour tournaments within the 12 months prior to the commitment deadline)

Juli Inkster (2), Se Ri Pak (6), Karrie Webb (2,5,6,7,8,9)

2. Winners of all previous ANA Inspirations

Amy Alcott, Pat Hurst, Stacy Lewis (3,5,6,7,8,9), Brittany Lincicome (7,8,9), Inbee Park (3,5,7,8,9), Morgan Pressel (6,8), Lexi Thompson (5,6,8,9), Yani Tseng (3,8), Sun-Young Yoo (8)

3. Winners of the U.S. Women's Open, Women's PGA Championship, and Ricoh Women's British Open in the previous five years

Na Yeon Choi (5,6,7,8,9), Paula Creamer (5,8,9), Shanshan Feng (5,6,7,8,9), Cristie Kerr (5,6,8,9), Mo Martin (5,7,8), So Yeon Ryu (5,7,8,9), Michelle Wie (5,6,7,8,9)

Jiyai Shin (5,6) did not play

4. Winners of The Evian Championship in the previous two years

Kim Hyo-joo (5,7,9,10), Suzann Pettersen (5,7,8,9)

5. Winners of official LPGA Tour tournaments from the 2012 Kraft Nabisco Championship through the week immediately preceding the 2015 ANA Inspiration

Baek Kyu-jung (9), Austin Ernst (8), M. J. Hur (7,8), Jennifer Johnson (8), Christina Kim (6,8), Kim Sei-young (9), Lydia Ko (7,8,9,12), Jessica Korda (7,8,9), Brittany Lang (8), Ilhee Lee (8), Mi Hyang Lee (8), Mirim Lee (8,9), Teresa Lu (9,10), Ai Miyazato, Mika Miyazato, Anna Nordqvist (6,7,8,9), Lee-Anne Pace (8,9), Park Hee-young (8), Beatriz Recari (8), Lizette Salas (8,9), Amy Yang (6,7,8,9)

Azahara Muñoz (6,7,8,9) did not play

6. All players who finished in the top-20 in the previous year's ANA Inspiration

Chella Choi (8,9), Charley Hull (10), Tiffany Joh (8), Lee Jee-young, Caroline Masson (8), Catriona Matthew (8), Gerina Piller (8), Angela Stanford (7,8,9)

7. All players who finished in the top-5 of the previous year's U.S. Women's Open, Wegmans LPGA Championship, Ricoh Women's British Open and The Evian Championship

Julieta Granada (8), Jang Ha-na (9), Ji Eun-hee (8), Meena Lee (8), Stephanie Meadow

8. Top-80 on the previous year's season-ending LPGA Tour official money list

Marina Alex, Amy Anderson, Dori Carter, Carlota Ciganda, Laura Davies, Laura Diaz, Jodi Ewart Shadoff, Sandra Gal, Mina Harigae, Caroline Hedwall, Karine Icher, Moriya Jutanugarn, Danielle Kang, Haeji Kang, Kim Kaufman, I.K. Kim, Katherine Kirk, P.K. Kongkraphan, Candie Kung, Amelia Lewis, Pernilla Lindberg, Sydnee Michaels, Belén Mozo, Haru Nomura, Oh Ji-young, Jane Park, Pornanong Phatlum (9), Paula Reto, Dewi Claire Schreefel, Giulia Sergas, Jenny Shin, Sarah Jane Smith, Thidapa Suwannapura, Kris Tamulis, Ayako Uehara, Mariajo Uribe

Line Vedel did not play

9. Top-30 on the Women's World Golf Rankings as of a March 10, 2015

Chun In-gee

Ahn Sun-ju (10) did not play

10. Top-2 players from the previous year's season-ending Ladies European Tour Order of Merit, LPGA of Japan Tour money list and LPGA of Korea Tour money list

Heo Yoon-kyung, Gwladys Nocera

11. Top-20 players plus ties on the current year LPGA Tour official money list at the end of the last official tournament prior to the current ANA Inspiration, not otherwise qualified above, provided such players are within the top-80 positions on the current year LPGA Tour official money list at the beginning of the tournament competition

Katie Burnett, Paz Echeverria, Yueer Cindy Feng, Jaye Marie Green, María Hernández, Wei-Ling Hsu, Ariya Jutanugarn, Alison Lee, Minjee Lee, Xi Yu Lin, Alena Sharp, Kelly Shon, Jennifer Song, Alison Walshe, Sakura Yokomine

12. Previous year's Louise Suggs Rolex Rookie of the Year

13. Previous year's U.S. Women's Amateur champion, provided she is still an amateur at the beginning of tournament competition

Kristen Gillman did not play

14. Any LPGA Member who did not compete in the previous year's ANA Inspiration major due to injury, illness or maternity, who subsequently received a medical/maternity extension of membership from the LPGA in the previous calendar year, provided they were otherwise qualified to compete in the previous year's ANA Inspiration

15. Up to six sponsor invitations for top-ranked amateur players

Céline Boutier (a), Nelly Korda (a), Andrea Lee (a), Mika Liu (a), Haley Moore (a), Bethany Wu (a)

== Course layout ==
Dinah Shore Tournament Course

Hole	1	2	3	4	5	6	7	8	9	Out	10	11	12	13	14	15	16	17	18	In	Total
Yards	377	517	420	380	182	391	395	169	538	3,369	388	536	389	424	148	387	418	179	531	3,400	6,769
Par	4	5	4	4	3	4	4	3	5	36	4	5	4	4	3	4	4	3	5	36	72

== Round summaries ==
=== First round ===
Thursday, April 2, 2015

Morgan Pressel, the event's 2007 champion, shot a 5-under-par 67 to take a one-stroke lead over Ai Miyazato. Lydia Ko shot a one-under par 71 to tie Annika Sörenstam with 29 consecutive rounds under par in LPGA Tour events. Defending champion Lexi Thompson shot an ever par 72.

Place	Player	Score	To par
1	(United States) Morgan Pressel	67	−5
2	(Japan) Ai Miyazato	68	−4
T3	(United States) Juli Inkster	69	−3
T3	(France) Gwladys Nocera	69	−3
T3	(South Korea) So Yeon Ryu	69	−3
T3	(United States) Alison Walshe	69	−3
T7	(South Korea) Na Yeon Choi	70	−2
T7	(United States) Austin Ernst	70	−2
T7	(England) Charley Hull	70	−2
T10	(South Korea) Chun In-gee	71	−1
T10	(China) Shanshan Feng	71	−1
T10	(United States) Pat Hurst	71	−1
T10	(Thailand) Ariya Jutanugarn	71	−1
T10	(Thailand) Moriya Jutanugarn	71	−1
T10	(South Korea) Haeji Kang	71	−1
T10	(South Korea) Kim Hyo-joo	71	−1
T10	(New Zealand) Lydia Ko	71	−1
T10	(United States) Alison Lee	71	−1
T10	(South Korea) Meena Lee	71	−1
T10	(South Korea) Mirim Lee	71	−1
T10	(Sweden) Pernilla Lindberg	71	−1
T10	(Scotland) Catriona Matthew	71	−1
T10	(Sweden) Anna Nordqvist	71	−1
T10	(South Korea) Jenny Shin	71	−1
T10	(South Korea) Amy Yang	71	−1

=== Second round ===
Friday, April 3, 2015

LPGA Tour rookie Kim Sei-young took the lead, shooting the day's low score of 65. Lydia Ko shot a round of one-over-par 73 to end her record-tying streak of 29 consecutive rounds. 73 players made the cut, which fell at three-over-par.

Place	Player	Score	To par
1	(South Korea) Kim Sei-young	72-65=137	−7
2	(United States) Morgan Pressel	67-72=139	−5
T3	(United States) Brittany Lincicome	72-68=140	−4
T3	(Scotland) Catriona Matthew	71-69=140	−4
T3	(South Korea) Jenny Shin	71-69=140	−4
T6	(China) Shanshan Feng	71-70=141	−3
T6	(Thailand) Moriya Jutanugarn	71-70=141	−3
T6	(South Korea) Mirim Lee	71-70=141	−3
T6	(United States) Stacy Lewis	72-69=141	−3
T6	(South Korea) So Yeon Ryu	69-72=141	−3
T6	(United States) Angela Stanford	72-69=141	−3
T6	(United States) Lexi Thompson	72-69=141	−3

=== Third round ===
Saturday, April 4, 2015

Place	Player	Score	To par
1	(South Korea) Kim Sei-young	72-65-69=206	−10
2	(United States) Stacy Lewis	72-69-68=209	−7
T3	(Thailand) Ariya Jutanugarn	71-73-66=210	−6
T3	(United States) Brittany Lincicome	72-68-70=210	−6
T3	(United States) Morgan Pressel	67-72-71=210	−6
T6	(China) Shanshan Feng	71-70-70=211	−5
T6	(Thailand) Moriya Jutanugarn	71-70-70=211	−5
T6	(South Korea) Jenny Shin	71-69-71=211	−5
T9	(United States) Pat Hurst	71-71-70=212	−4
T9	(South Korea) Mi Hyang Lee	74-68-70=212	−4
T9	(Sweden) Anna Nordqvist	71-72-69=212	−4
T9	(South Korea) So Yeon Ryu	69-72-71=212	−4
T9	(United States) Lexi Thompson	72-69-71=212	−4

=== Final round ===
Sunday, April 5, 2015

Place	Player	Score	To par	Money ($)
T1	(United States) Stacy Lewis	72-69-68-70=279	−9	Playoff
T1	(United States) Brittany Lincicome	72-68-70-69=279	−9	Playoff
3	(United States) Morgan Pressel	67-72-71-70=280	−8	167,900
T4	(Spain) Carlota Ciganda	74-71-68-68=281	−7	106,653
T4	(South Korea) Sei Young Kim	72-65-69-75=281	−7	106,653
T4	(Sweden) Anna Nordqvist	71-72-69-69=281	−7	106,653
7	(United States) Lexi Thompson	72-69-71-70=282	−6	71,595
T8	(China) Shanshan Feng	71-70-70-72=283	−5	56,812
T8	(South Korea) Mi Hyang Lee	74-68-70-71=283	−5	56,812
T8	(Norway) Suzann Pettersen	76-68-72-67=283	−5	56,812

Amateurs: Haley Moore (+6)

==== Scorecard ====
Final round

Hole	1	2	3	4	5	6	7	8	9	10	11	12	13	14	15	16	17	18
Par	4	5	4	4	3	4	4	3	5	4	5	4	4	3	4	4	3	5
(United States) Lewis	−8	−8	−8	−8	−8	−8	−9	−8	−8	−9	−10	−11	−10	−10	−9	−9	−9	−9
(United States) Lincicome	−6	−6	−6	−7	−7	−6	−7	−7	−7	−7	−7	−7	−7	−7	−7	−7	−7	−9
(United States) Pressel	−6	−7	−7	−7	−7	−7	−6	−6	−6	−5	−5	−6	−6	−6	−7	−7	−7	−8
(South Korea) Kim	−10	−11	−11	−9	−9	−10	−10	−10	−10	−11	−10	−9	−10	−8	−7	−8	−7	−7

==== Playoff ====
The playoff was held on the par-5 18th hole only and Lincicome won on the third extra hole with a par.

Place	Player	Score	To par	Money ($)
1	(United States) Brittany Lincicome	5-5-5=15	E	375,000
2	(United States) Stacy Lewis	5-5-6=16	+1	231,449
