= 2015 Women's PGA Championship =

Women's golf tournament

Tournament information
- Dates: June 11–14, 2015
- Location: Harrison, New York, U.S. 41.0°N 73.7°W
- Courses: Westchester Country Club, West Course
- Organized by: PGA of America
- Tour: LPGA Tour
- Format: Stroke play - 72 holes

Statistics
- Par: 73
- Length: 6,670 yards (6,099 m)
- Field: 156 players, 73 after cut
- Cut: 147 (+1)
- Prize fund: $3.5 million
- Winner's share: $525,000

Champion
- (South Korea) Inbee Park
- 273 (−19)
- Location in the United States Location in New York

The 2015 KPMG Women's PGA Championship was the 61st Women's PGA Championship, held June 11–14 at Westchester Country Club in Harrison, New York, a suburb northeast of New York City.

The 2015 edition saw major changes to the event, due to a new partnership between the LPGA and the PGA of America. The event was renamed from the "LPGA Championship" to the "Women's PGA Championship" (making it a sister event to the men's PGA Championship), and its purse was increased from $2.25 million to $3.5 million. KPMG also became the new title sponsor of the event, replacing Wegmans.

Inbee Park won the tournament for the third consecutive year.

== Field ==
The field included 156 players who met one or more of the selection criteria and committed to participate by a designated deadline.

=== Qualified players ===
Players who have qualified for the Championship are listed below. Players are listed under the first category in which they qualified; additional qualifying categories are shown in parentheses.

1. Active LPGA Hall of Fame members

Juli Inkster (2,10), Se Ri Pak (2,10), Karrie Webb (2,4,6,10)

2. Past winners of the LPGA Championship

Laura Davies (10), Shanshan Feng (3,4,5,6,10), Cristie Kerr (3,4,6,8,10), Anna Nordqvist (4,5,6,8,10), Inbee Park (3,4,5,6,10), Suzann Pettersen (3,4,5,6,8,10), Yani Tseng (3,10)

3. Professionals who have won an LPGA major championship in the previous five years and during the current year

Na Yeon Choi (4,6,10), Paula Creamer (4,8,10), Kim Hyo-joo (4,6,10), Stacy Lewis (4,5,6,8,10), Brittany Lincicome (5,6,8,10), Mo Martin (4,10), So Yeon Ryu (4,6,10), Lexi Thompson (4,6,8,10), Michelle Wie (4,6,8,10), Sun-Young Yoo (10)

Jiyai Shin (4) did not play

4. Professionals who have won an official LPGA tournament in the previous two calendar years and during the current year

Baek Kyu-jung (6,10), Austin Ernst (10), Mi Jung Hur (10), Jennifer Johnson (10), Christina Kim (10), Kim Sei-young (6,10), Lydia Ko (5,6,10), Jessica Korda (6,8,10), Ilhee Lee (10), Mi Hyang Lee (10), Minjee Lee (10), Mirim Lee (5,6,10), Lee-Anne Pace (10), Hee-Young Park (10), Beatriz Recari (8,10), Lizette Salas (8,10), Amy Yang (6,10)

Teresa Lu (6) did not play

5. Professionals who finished top-10 and ties at the previous year's LPGA Championship

Julieta Granada (10), Azahara Muñoz (6,8,10)

6. Professionals ranked in the top 30 of the Women's World Golf Rankings as of May 12, 2015

Chella Choi (10), Jang Ha-na (10), Pornanong Phatlum (10), Morgan Pressel (8,10), Angela Stanford (8,10)

Ahn Sun-ju, Chun In-gee, Ko Jin-young, and Lee Bo-Mee did not play

7. The top eight finishers at the 2014 LPGA T&CP National Championship

Jean Bartholomew, Elizabeth Caron, Alison Curdt, Lisa Grimes, Amanda Moore, Karen Paolozzi, Laurie Rinker, Charlotta Sörenstam

Anne Marie Goslak, and Ashley Grier did not play

8. Members of the European and United States Solheim Cup Teams in 2013

Carlota Ciganda (10), Jodi Ewart Shadoff (10), Caroline Hedwall (10), Charley Hull, Karine Icher (10), Brittany Lang (10), Caroline Masson (10), Catriona Matthew (10), Gerina Piller (10)

Giulia Sergas (10) did not play

9. Maximum of two sponsor invites

Brooke Henderson, Gwladys Nocera

10. LPGA members who have committed to the event, ranked in the order of their position on the 2015 official money list through the conclusion of the Manulife Financial LPGA Classic

Marina Alex, Amy Anderson, Karlin Beck, Laetitia Beck, Christel Boeljon, Danah Bordner, Katie Burnett, Dori Carter, Sandra Changkija, Jacqui Concolino, Perrine Delacour, Laura Diaz, Kendall Dye, Paz Echeverria, Victoria Elizabeth, Simin Feng, Yueer Cindy Feng, Lisa Ferrero, Sandra Gal, Jaye Marie Green, Natalie Gulbis, Mina Harigae, María Hernández, Wei-Ling Hsu, Pat Hurst, Eun-Hee Ji, Tiffany Joh, Felicity Johnson, Ariya Jutanugarn, Moriya Jutanugarn, Danielle Kang, Haeji Kang, Kim Kaufman, Sarah Kemp, I.K. Kim, SooBin Kim, Sue Kim, Katherine Kirk, Joanna Klatten, Therese Koelbaek, P.K. Kongkraphan, Candie Kung, Min Seo Kwak, Alison Lee, Jee Young Lee, Meena Lee, Min Lee, Rebecca Lee-Bentham, Amelia Lewis, Xi Yu Lin, Pernilla Lindberg, Alejandra Llaneza, Maria McBride, Lisa McCloskey, Kristy McPherson, Stephanie Meadow, Sydnee Michaels, Mika Miyazato, Becky Morgan, Belén Mozo, Haru Nomura, Ji Young Oh, Ryann O'Toole, Brooke Pancake, Jane Park, Sadena Parks, Sophia Popov, Jane Rah, Paula Reto, Jennifer Rosales, Demi Runas, Dewi Claire Schreefel, Hee-Kyung Seo, Alena Sharp, Jenny Shin, Kelly Shon, Ashleigh Simon, Karin Sjödin, Sarah Jane Smith, Jennifer Song, Marissa Steen, Jackie Stoelting, Jenny Suh, Thidapa Suwannapura, Kris Tamulis, Kelly Tan, Ayako Uehara, Mariajo Uribe, Alison Walshe, Cheyenne Woods, Jing Yan, Julie Yang, Sakura Yokomine

Cydney Clanton, Rachel Hetherington, Seon-Hwa Lee, Ai Miyazato, Giulia Molinaro, and Line Vedel qualified for the tournament but did not play.

11. The remainder of the field will be filled by members who have committed to the event, ranked in the order of their position on the 2015 LPGA Priority List as of the commitment deadline

== Course layout ==
West Course

| Hole | 1 | 2 | 3 | 4 | 5 | 6 | 7 | 8 | 9 | Out | 10 | 11 | 12 | 13 | 14 | 15 | 16 | 17 | 18 | In | Total |
|---|---|---|---|---|---|---|---|---|---|---|---|---|---|---|---|---|---|---|---|---|---|
| Yards | 180 | 395 | 436 | 410 | 545 | 140 | 328 | 421 | 475 | 3,330 | 296 | 424 | 473 | 379 | 154 | 492 | 216 | 374 | 532 | 3,340 | 6,670 |
| Par | 3 | 4 | 4 | 4 | 5 | 3 | 4 | 4 | 5 | 36 | 4 | 4 | 5 | 4 | 3 | 5 | 3 | 4 | 5 | 37 | 73 |

== Round summaries ==
=== First round ===
Thursday, June 11, 2015

| Place | Player | Score | To par |
|---|---|---|---|
| 1 | (South Korea) Jenny Shin | 66 | −7 |
| 2 | (Canada) Brooke Henderson | 67 | −6 |
| T3 | (England) Charley Hull | 68 | −5 |
| T3 | (Thailand) Moriya Jutanugarn | 68 | −5 |
| T3 | (Australia) Karrie Webb | 68 | −5 |
| T6 | (China) Simin Feng | 69 | −4 |
| T6 | (France) Karine Icher | 69 | −4 |
| T8 | (South Korea) Chella Choi | 70 | −3 |
| T8 | (Germany) Sandra Gal | 70 | −3 |
| T8 | (United States) Christie Kerr | 70 | −3 |
| T8 | (South Korea) Kim Hyo-joo | 70 | −3 |
| T8 | (South Korea) Kim Sei-young | 70 | −3 |
| T8 | (France) Joanna Klatten | 70 | −3 |
| T8 | (United States) Jessica Korda | 70 | −3 |
| T8 | (Taiwan) Candie Kung | 70 | −3 |
| T8 | (Taiwan) Min Lee | 70 | −3 |
| T8 | (United States) Stacy Lewis | 70 | −3 |
| T8 | (United States) Brittany Lincicome | 70 | −3 |
| T8 | (Spain) Azahara Muñoz | 70 | −3 |
| T8 | (United States) Jane Rah | 70 | −3 |
| T8 | (United States) Jennifer Song | 70 | −3 |
| T8 | (United States) Lexi Thompson | 70 | −3 |

=== Second round ===
Friday, June 12, 2015

| Place | Player | Score | To par |
|---|---|---|---|
| 1 | (South Korea) Kim Sei-young | 70-68=138 | −8 |
| T2 | (South Korea) Inbee Park | 71-68=139 | −7 |
| T2 | (Australia) Karrie Webb | 68-71=139 | −7 |
| T4 | (Canada) Brooke Henderson | 67-73=140 | −6 |
| T4 | (Norway) Suzann Pettersen | 74-66=140 | −6 |
| T6 | (United States) Stacy Lewis | 70-71=141 | −5 |
| T6 | (South Korea) Jenny Shin | 66-75=141 | −5 |
| T8 | (Sweden) Caroline Hedwall | 71-71=142 | −4 |
| T8 | (England) Charley Hull | 68-74=142 | −4 |
| T8 | (United States) Cristie Kerr | 70-72=142 | −4 |
| T8 | (Taiwan) Candie Kung | 70-72=142 | −4 |
| T8 | (United States) Gerina Piller | 72-70=142 | −4 |
| T8 | (United States) Lexi Thompson | 70-72=142 | −4 |

=== Third round ===
Saturday, June 13, 2015

| Place | Player | Score | To par |
|---|---|---|---|
| 1 | (South Korea) Inbee Park | 71-68-66=205 | −14 |
| 2 | (South Korea) Kim Sei-young | 70-68-69=207 | −12 |
| T3 | (Canada) Brooke Henderson | 67-73-71=211 | −8 |
| T3 | (Norway) Suzann Pettersen | 74-66-71=211 | −8 |
| T3 | (Australia) Karrie Webb | 68-71-72=211 | −8 |
| 6 | (United States) Morgan Pressel | 73-70-69=212 | −7 |
| T7 | (China) Shanshan Feng | 73-72-68=213 | −6 |
| T7 | (South Korea) Kim Hyo-joo | 70-74-69=213 | −6 |
| T7 | (United States) Brittany Lincicome | 70-74-69=213 | −6 |
| T10 | (Paraguay) Julieta Granada | 72-71-71=214 | −5 |
| T10 | (United States) Stacy Lewis | 70-71-73=214 | −5 |
| T10 | (Sweden) Anna Nordqvist | 71-73-70=214 | −5 |
| T10 | (United States) Lexi Thompson | 70-72-72=214 | −5 |
| T10 | (Japan) Sakura Yokomine | 74-71-69=214 | −5 |

=== Final round ===
Sunday, June 14, 2015

| Place | Player | Score | To par | Money ($) |
|---|---|---|---|---|
| 1 | (South Korea) Inbee Park | 71-68-66-68=273 | −19 | 525,000 |
| 2 | (South Korea) Kim Sei-young | 70-68-69-71=278 | −14 | 323,230 |
| 3 | (United States) Lexi Thompson | 70-72-72-66=280 | −12 | 234,480 |
| 4 | (United States) Brittany Lincicome | 70-74-69-68=281 | −11 | 181,389 |
| T5 | (Canada) Brooke Henderson | 67-73-71-71=282 | −10 | 132,725 |
| T5 | (United States) Morgan Pressel | 73-70-69-70=282 | −10 | 132,725 |
| T7 | (Norway) Suzann Pettersen | 74-66-71-72=283 | −9 | 93,793 |
| T7 | (Australia) Karrie Webb | 68-71-72-72=283 | −9 | 93,793 |
| T9 | (South Korea) Kim Hyo-joo | 70-74-69-71=284 | −8 | 72,261 |
| T9 | (Sweden) Anna Nordqvist | 71-73-70-70=284 | −8 | 72,261 |
| T9 | (United States) Gerina Piller | 72-70-73-69=284 | −8 | 72,261 |

==== Scorecard ====
Final round

| Hole | 1 | 2 | 3 | 4 | 5 | 6 | 7 | 8 | 9 | 10 | 11 | 12 | 13 | 14 | 15 | 16 | 17 | 18 |
|---|---|---|---|---|---|---|---|---|---|---|---|---|---|---|---|---|---|---|
| Par | 3 | 4 | 4 | 4 | 5 | 3 | 4 | 4 | 5 | 4 | 4 | 5 | 4 | 3 | 5 | 3 | 4 | 5 |
| (South Korea) Park | −14 | −15 | −15 | −15 | −15 | −15 | −16 | −16 | −17 | −18 | −18 | −18 | −18 | −18 | −18 | −18 | −18 | −19 |
| (South Korea) Kim | −12 | −13 | −12 | −11 | −12 | −13 | −14 | −15 | −13 | −14 | −14 | −15 | −14 | −14 | −14 | −14 | −14 | −14 |
| (United States) Thompson | −6 | −6 | −6 | −7 | −7 | −7 | −8 | −9 | −10 | −11 | −11 | −12 | −13 | −13 | −13 | −12 | −12 | −12 |
| (United States) Lincicome | −5 | −6 | −6 | −5 | −6 | −6 | −6 | −6 | −7 | −8 | −8 | −9 | −9 | −9 | −10 | −11 | −10 | −11 |
| (Canada) Henderson | −8 | −8 | −8 | −8 | −8 | −8 | −8 | −8 | −9 | −9 | −9 | −10 | −10 | −10 | −10 | −10 | −10 | −10 |
| (United States) Pressel | −7 | −7 | −7 | −7 | −8 | −8 | −7 | −5 | −5 | −6 | −7 | −8 | −9 | −9 | −10 | −10 | −9 | −10 |

Cumulative tournament scores, relative to par

| Birdie | Bogey | Double bogey |
