= 2013 LPGA Championship =

Tournament information
- Dates: June 6–9, 2013
- Location: Pittsford, New York, U.S. 43.088°N 77.563°W
- Course: Locust Hill Country Club
- Organized by: LPGA
- Tour: LPGA Tour
- Format: Stroke play - 72 holes

Statistics
- Par: 72
- Length: 6,530 yards (5,971 m)
- Field: 150 players, 77 after cut
- Cut: 150 (+6)
- Prize fund: $2.25 million
- Winner's share: $337,500

Champion
- (South Korea) Inbee Park
- 283 (−5), playoff
- Location in the United States Location in New York

The 2013 LPGA Championship was the 59th LPGA Championship, held June 6–9 at Locust Hill Country Club in Pittsford, New York, a suburb southeast of Rochester. Known for sponsorship reasons as the Wegmans LPGA Championship, it was the second of five major championships on the LPGA Tour during the 2013 season. This was the fourth consecutive year the LPGA Championship was played at Locust Hill.

Inbee Park, number one in the world rankings, won her third major title in a sudden-death playoff, defeating runner-up Catriona Matthew on the third extra hole, their 39th of the day. The third and fourth rounds were played on Sunday after play was washed out by heavy rain on Thursday.

The win was the second consecutive major for Park; she won the Kraft Nabisco Championship in April and became only the third to win both in the same year, joining Pat Bradley (1986) and Annika Sörenstam (2005).

It was the eighth playoff at the LPGA Championship and the first since 2008.

== Course ==
| Hole | 1 | 2 | 3 | 4 | 5 | 6 | 7 | 8 | 9 | Out | 10 | 11 | 12 | 13 | 14 | 15 | 16 | 17 | 18 | In | Total |
|---|---|---|---|---|---|---|---|---|---|---|---|---|---|---|---|---|---|---|---|---|---|
| Yards | 414 | 337 | 380 | 532 | 161 | 439 | 178 | 466 | 172 | 3,079 | 413 | 511 | 361 | 386 | 400 | 150 | 356 | 478 | 396 | 3,451 | 6,530 |
| Par | 4 | 4 | 4 | 5 | 3 | 4 | 3 | 5 | 3 | 35 | 4 | 5 | 4 | 4 | 4 | 3 | 4 | 5 | 4 | 37 | 72 |

== Field ==
The field included 150 players from 24 countries, with the 36-hole cut to the top 70 players and ties after the second round.

== Round summaries ==
=== First round ===
Thursday, June 6, 2013
Friday, June 7, 2013

Play was washed out on Thursday due to heavy rain, course flooding, and occasional lightning. Chella Choi shot a 67 (−5) on Friday on a soggy course to take the first round lead; major winners Morgan Pressel and Jiyai Shin were one stroke back at 68.

| Place | Player | Score | To par |
|---|---|---|---|
| 1 | (South Korea) Chella Choi | 67 | −5 |
| T2 | (United States) Morgan Pressel | 68 | −4 |
| T2 | (South Korea) Jiyai Shin | 68 | −4 |
| 4 | (United States) Brittany Lincicome | 69 | −3 |
| T5 | (United States) Jessica Korda | 70 | −2 |
| T5 | (South Korea) Se Ri Pak | 70 | −2 |
| T7 | (Japan) Chie Arimura | 71 | −1 |
| T7 | (England) Laura Davies | 71 | −1 |
| T7 | (South Korea) M. J. Hur | 71 | −1 |
| T7 | (South Korea) Ilhee Lee | 71 | −1 |
| T7 | (Scotland) Catriona Matthew | 71 | −1 |
| T7 | (Sweden) Anna Nordqvist | 71 | −1 |
| T7 | (United States) Angela Stanford | 71 | −1 |
| T7 | (United States) Lexi Thompson | 71 | −1 |
| T7 | (South Korea) Amy Yang | 71 | −1 |

=== Second round ===
Saturday, June 8, 2013

Pressel grabbed the lead with a 70 (−2) for 138 (−6), and world number one Inbee Park shot 68 to move into tie for second place with first round leader Choi, two strokes back at 140 (−4). The cut was at 150 (+6) or better, with 77 players advancing to play the final two rounds on Sunday.

| Place | Player | Score | To par |
|---|---|---|---|
| 1 | (United States) Morgan Pressel | 68-70=138 | −6 |
| T2 | (South Korea) Chella Choi | 67-73=140 | −4 |
| T2 | (South Korea) Inbee Park | 72-68=140 | −4 |
| T4 | (South Korea) Jiyai Shin | 68-73=141 | −3 |
| T4 | (Australia) Sarah Jane Smith | 72-69=141 | −3 |
| T4 | (South Korea) Amy Yang | 71-70=141 | −3 |
| T7 | (South Korea) Na Yeon Choi | 72-70=142 | −2 |
| T7 | (United States) Brittany Lincicome | 69-73=142 | −2 |
| T7 | (Scotland) Catriona Matthew | 71-71=142 | −2 |
| T7 | (United States) Angela Stanford | 71-71=142 | −2 |
| T7 | (South Korea) Sun Young Yoo | 73-69=142 | −2 |

=== Third round ===
Sunday, June 9, 2013 (morning)

One-over for the round after the first eight holes, Park then made five birdies and five pars for another 68 (−4) to total 208 (−8), one stroke ahead of Pressel.

| Place | Player | Score | To par |
|---|---|---|---|
| 1 | (South Korea) Inbee Park | 72-68-68=208 | −8 |
| 2 | (United States) Morgan Pressel | 68-70-71=209 | −7 |
| 3 | (South Korea) Jiyai Shin | 68-73-69=210 | −6 |
| T4 | (South Korea) Na Yeon Choi | 72-70-70=212 | −4 |
| T4 | (South Korea) Sun Young Yoo | 73-69-70=212 | −4 |
| 6 | (South Korea) Chella Choi | 67-73-73=213 | −3 |
| T7 | (Germany) Caroline Masson | 74-69-71=214 | −2 |
| T7 | (United States) Kristy McPherson | 73-72-69=214 | −2 |
| T9 | (Sweden) Pernilla Lindberg | 73-71-71=215 | −1 |
| T9 | (Scotland) Catriona Matthew | 71-71-73=215 | −1 |
| T9 | (Japan) Ai Miyazato | 74-75-66=215 | −1 |
| T9 | (United States) Michelle Wie | 76-68-71=215 | −1 |
| T9 | (South Korea) Amy Yang | 71-70-74=215 | −1 |

=== Final round ===
Sunday, June 9, 2013 (afternoon)

Following the third round in the morning, the groupings were kept the same for the afternoon's final round. The top three players after 54 holes, Park, Pressel, and Shin, all shot 75 (+3) and came back to the field. Matthew recorded a 68 (−4) without a bogey for a 283 (−5), which tied Park and forced a sudden-death playoff. Suzann Pettersen, the champion in 2007, started the round eleven strokes back, in a tie for 31st. She carded a tournament best 65 (−7), but finished one stroke back at 284 (−4), tied with Pressel for third place.

| Place | Player | Score | To par | Money ($) |
|---|---|---|---|---|
| T1 | (South Korea) Inbee Park | 72-68-68-75=283 | −5 | Playoff |
| T1 | (Scotland) Catriona Matthew | 71-71-73-68=283 | −5 | Playoff |
| T3 | (Norway) Suzann Pettersen | 72-73-74-65=284 | −4 | 132,716 |
| T3 | (United States) Morgan Pressel | 68-70-71-75=284 | −4 | 132,716 |
| T5 | (South Korea) Chella Choi | 67-73-73-72=285 | −3 | 72,288 |
| T5 | (South Korea) Jiyai Shin | 68-73-69-75=285 | −3 | 72,288 |
| T5 | (South Korea) Amy Yang | 71-70-74-70=285 | −3 | 72,288 |
| T5 | (South Korea) Sun Young Yoo | 73-69-70-73=285 | −3 | 72,288 |
| T9 | (South Korea) Na Yeon Choi | 72-70-70-74=286 | −2 | 46,121 |
| T9 | (China) Shanshan Feng | 74-70-72-70=286 | −2 | 46,121 |
| T9 | (United States) Michelle Wie | 76-68-71-71=286 | −2 | 46,121 |

==== Scorecard ====
Final round

| Hole | 1 | 2 | 3 | 4 | 5 | 6 | 7 | 8 | 9 | 10 | 11 | 12 | 13 | 14 | 15 | 16 | 17 | 18 |
|---|---|---|---|---|---|---|---|---|---|---|---|---|---|---|---|---|---|---|
| Par | 4 | 4 | 4 | 5 | 3 | 4 | 3 | 5 | 3 | 4 | 5 | 4 | 4 | 4 | 3 | 4 | 5 | 4 |
| (South Korea) Park | −8 | −8 | −8 | −8 | −9 | −8 | −8 | −7 | −7 | −7 | −8 | −8 | −8 | −7 | −7 | −6 | −6 | −5 |
| (Scotland) Matthew | −1 | −2 | −2 | −2 | −2 | −3 | −3 | −3 | −4 | −4 | −4 | −4 | −4 | −4 | −4 | −4 | −5 | −5 |
| (Norway) Pettersen | +3 | +3 | +2 | +2 | +1 | +1 | +1 | E | E | −1 | −1 | −1 | −2 | −2 | −2 | −3 | −3 | −4 |
| (United States) Pressel | −7 | −7 | −7 | −7 | −7 | −7 | −6 | −7 | −7 | −6 | −6 | −5 | −5 | −5 | −5 | −4 | −4 | −4 |
| (South Korea) Shin | −5 | −4 | −4 | −4 | −4 | −3 | −2 | −2 | −2 | −2 | −3 | −2 | −3 | −2 | −3 | −4 | −3 | −3 |

Cumulative tournament scores, relative to par

| Birdie | Bogey |

==== Playoff ====
The sudden-death playoff began on the 18th hole and alternated with the 10th hole, both par fours. Both players parred the first two holes, with Matthew scrambling for par on the second after finding the rough and pitching out to the fairway. She drove into the rough again on the third hole while Park hit the fairway. Matthew failed to chip in for par from 50 feet (15 m) and Park sank her 18-foot (5.5 m) birdie putt for the championship.

| Place | Player | Score | To par | Money ($) |
|---|---|---|---|---|
| 1 | (South Korea) Inbee Park | 4-4-3 | −1 | 337,500 |
| 2 | (Scotland) Catriona Matthew | 4-4-x | | 206,304 |
