= Locust Hill Country Club =

Championship golf club

Coordinates: 43°05′17″N 77°33′48″W

Club information
- Location: Pittsford, New York, U.S.
- Established: 1931 (1925)
- Type: Private
- Tota holes: 18
- Tournaments: LPGA Championship (2010-2013); Wegmans LPGA (1977-2009)
- Website: locusthill.org
- Designed by: Seymour Dunn; Robert Trent Jones (redesign)
- Par: 72
- Length: 6,615 yards (6,049 m)
- Course rating: 72.8
- Slope rating: 138

Locust Hill Country Club is a championship golf club located in the Towns of Henrietta and Pittsford, New York, suburbs six miles (10 km) southeast of downtown Rochester.

== Golf course ==
The club was founded in 1925 as a nine-hole golf course on the 89-acre (0.36 km^{2}) Locust Hill farm of Frank Zornow in the Town of Henrietta, bordering the Town of Pittsford.

In 1927, members purchased the 52-acre (0.21 km^{2}) Brei Farm on the south side of Jefferson Road in Pittsford, and it reopened as an 18-hole course in 1931, redesigned by golf course architect Robert Trent Jones.

This par 72 (35, 37) course is one of the country's top courses, along with Rochester's Oak Hill Country Club, and Country Club of Rochester. Despite being a relatively short course at 6,615 yards (6,049 m), it has proven to be difficult year after year with tight fairways and tough greens. The course rating is 72.8 with a slope rating of 138.

In 1966, a charity event was held at LHCC in which RDGA members played with stars such as Arnold Palmer and Jack Nicklaus. Nicklaus drove the green on a 360-yard (329 m) par 4 and two-putted for birdie, while Palmer holed out for eagle on the 466-yard (426 m) eighth hole. Both stated their love for the course after their rounds.

== LPGA ==
From 1977 to 2009, Locust Hill CC was the host of the annual Wegmans LPGA tournament, one of the most popular annual events on the LPGA Tour. The tournament was formerly known as the Bankers Trust Classic (1977–78), Sarah Coventry (1979–81), Rochester International (1982–97), Wegmans Rochester International (1998–2001) and Wegmans Rochester LPGA (2002–05). Locust Hill was the site of Nancy Lopez's fifth consecutive LPGA tournament victory in 1978, a record-setting performance.

From 2010 to 2013, it hosted the LPGA Championship in June, one of the four major championships. The 2010 title was won by Cristie Kerr at 269 (−19), a dozen strokes ahead of the field. In 2011, Yani Tseng won by ten strokes, again at 269 (–19). With longer rough in 2012, Shanshan Feng won her first event on tour by two strokes with a 282 (–6). Top-ranked Inbee Park won in 2013, in a sudden-death playoff over Catriona Matthew. The event moved a few miles east to nearby Monroe Golf Club in 2014.

== Scorecard ==
Locust Hill Country Club
Tee	Rating/Slope	1	2	3	4	5	6	7	8	9	Out	10	11	12	13	14	15	16	17	18	In	Total
Green	72.8/138	453	337	382	515	163	447	209	459	180	3145	424	527	362	411	392	142	333	482	397	3470	6615
White	72.0/134	448	325	347	506	155	440	202	450	164	3037	414	495	352	402	381	126	330	465	377	3342	6379
Senior	69.5/126	391	249	293	506	155	440	166	394	164	2758	379	395	352	402	276	126	330	465	377	3102	5860
Par	Men's	4	4	4	5	3	4	3	5	3	35	4	5	4	4	4	3	4	5	4	37	72
SI	Men's	5	9	13	1	17	3	11	7	15		10	2	4	8	14	18	16	12	6
Ladies	74.1/135	391	249	293	428	145	413	166	394	146	2625	379	395	337	371	276	122	325	443	355	3003	5628
Par	Women's	5	4	4	5	3	5	3	5	3	37	4	5	4	4	4	3	4	5	4	37	74
SI	Women's	7	1	11	5	15	9	13	3	17		14	2	10	8	4	18	12	6	16
