= 2013 Kraft Nabisco Championship =

Coordinates: 33.798°N 116.433°W

Tournament information
- Dates: April 4–7, 2013
- Location: Rancho Mirage, California
- Courses: Mission Hills Country Club; Dinah Shore Tournament Course
- Tour: LPGA Tour
- Format: Stroke play - 72 holes

Statistics
- Par: 72
- Length: 6,738 yards (6,161 m)
- Field: 111 players, 73 after cut
- Cut: 149 (+5)
- Prize fund: $2.0 million
- Winner's share: $300,000

Champion
- (South Korea) Inbee Park
- 273 (−15)

Location in the United States
Location in California

The 2013 Kraft Nabisco Championship was the 42nd Kraft Nabisco Championship, held April 4–7 at the Dinah Shore Tournament Course of Mission Hills Country Club in Rancho Mirage, California. In its 31st year as a major championship, Inbee Park won her second major title, four strokes ahead of runner-up So Yeon Ryu.

It was the first of Park's three consecutive major victories in 2013; the first to win the opening three majors of a season since Babe Zaharias in 1950.

For the first time as a major, a defending champion missed the cut: Sun-Young Yoo was at 153 (+9).

== Field ==
The field of 111 players included nine amateurs.

== Round summaries ==
=== First round ===
Thursday, April 4, 2013

Na Yeon Choi, Jodi Ewart Shadoff, and Suzann Pettersen shot 68 (−4) to hold a three-way tie for the lead, with Anna Nordqvist and Amy Yang a stroke back. Defending champion Sun-Young Yoo was tied for 90th place after a 77 (+5). World number one Stacy Lewis, the 2011 champion, had a triple bogey on the 14th hole leading to a 73, five strokes behind the leaders.

Place	Player	Score	To par
T1	(South Korea) Na Yeon Choi	68	−4
T1	(England) Jodi Ewart Shadoff	68	−4
T1	(Norway) Suzann Pettersen	68	−4
T4	(Sweden) Anna Nordqvist	69	−3
T4	(South Korea) Amy Yang	69	−3
T6	(United States) Jacqui Concolino	70	−2
T6	(Thailand) Moriya Jutanugarn	70	−2
T6	(United States) Jessica Korda	70	−2
T6	(Germany) Caroline Masson	70	−2
T6	(South Korea) Hee Young Park	70	−2
T6	(South Korea) Inbee Park	70	−2
T6	(United States) Jane Park	70	−2
T6	(United States) Lizette Salas	70	−2
T6	(Italy) Giulia Sergas	70	−2
T6	(South Korea) Jiyai Shin	70	−2
T6	(United States) Angela Stanford	70	−2

=== Second round ===
Friday, April 5, 2013

The cut came at 149 (+5) with 73 players continuing to the weekend, including five of the nine amateurs. Reigning Vare Trophy winner Inbee Park shot 67 (−5) to move into first place with a one-stroke lead over Lizette Salas. Round one co-leaders Shadoff, Choi, and Pettersen fell to three, six, and six strokes back, respectively. Defending champion Yoo missed the cut—the first time in Kraft Nabisco Championship history. Two players, Jeong Jang and Yi Eun-jung, withdrew before completing round two.

Place	Player	Score	To par
1	(South Korea) Inbee Park	70-67=137	−7
2	(United States) Lizette Salas	70-68=138	−6
T3	(Sweden) Caroline Hedwall	71-68=139	−5
T3	(Italy) Giulia Sergas	70-69=139	−5
T5	(England) Jodi Ewart Shadoff	68-72=140	−4
T5	(South Korea) Hee Young Park	70-70=140	−4
T5	(Thailand) Pornanong Phatlum	71-69=140	−4
T8	(South Korea) Haeji Kang	72-69=141	−3
T8	(Sweden) Anna Nordqvist	69-72=141	−3
T8	(South Korea) Se Ri Pak	72-69=141	−3
T8	(South Korea) Jiyai Shin	70-71=141	−3

Amateurs: Hedberg (E), Ko (+2), Meadow (+2), Ramsey (+2), Yin (+4), Duncan (+6), Chen (+7), Hall (+10), Lendl (+29).

=== Third round ===
Saturday, April 6, 2013

Park and Salas retained their first and second place positions, with Park opening up the lead to three strokes after shooting a bogey-free 67 (−5) and 204 (−12). Six players were tied for third, three shots behind Salas at 210, including Angela Stanford, with a round-low 66 (−6) on Saturday.

Place	Player	Score	To par
1	(South Korea) Inbee Park	70-67-67=204	−12
2	(United States) Lizette Salas	70-68-69=207	−9
T3	(France) Karine Icher	72-70-68=210	−6
T3	(United States) Jessica Korda	70-72-68=210	−6
T3	(Norway) Suzann Pettersen	68-75-67=210	−6
T3	(Thailand) Pornanong Phatlum	71-69-70=210	−6
T3	(United States) Angela Stanford	70-74-66=210	−6
T3	(Australia) Karrie Webb	72-71-67=210	−6
T9	(United States) Paula Creamer	74-68-69=211	−5
T9	(Sweden) Caroline Hedwall	71-68-72=211	−5

=== Final round ===
Sunday, April 7, 2013

Again in the final pairing, Park birdied the first hole while Salas double-bogeyed to double the lead to six strokes. Playing nearly an hour ahead, So Yeon Ryu shot a bogey-free 65 (−7) to climb the leaderboard into solo second place. Park finished with a 69 (−3) to finish with a four-stroke margin over Ryu. Salas shot a 79 (+7) and fell to a tie for 25th place at 286 (−2).

Place	Player	Score	To par	Money ($)
1	(South Korea) Inbee Park	70-67-67-69=273	−15	300,000
2	(South Korea) So Yeon Ryu	73-71-68-65=277	−11	187,073
T3	(Sweden) Caroline Hedwall	71-68-72-68=279	−9	120,345
T3	(Norway) Suzann Pettersen	68-75-67-69=279	−9	120,345
T5	(South Korea) Haeji Kang	72-69-73-68=282	−6	76,816
T5	(Australia) Karrie Webb	72-71-68-72=282	−6	76,816
T7	(England) Jodi Ewart Shadoff	68-72-74-69=283	−5	44,980
T7	(Scotland) Catriona Matthew	72-73-70-68=283	−5	44,980
T7	(Sweden) Anna Nordqvist	69-72-72-70=283	−5	44,980
T7	(South Korea) Hee Young Park	70-70-72-71=283	−5	44,980
T7	(Italy) Giulia Sergas	70-69-76-68=283	−5	44,980
T7	(South Korea) Jiyai Shin	70-71-71-71=283	−5	44,980

Amateurs:Ko (−2), Meadow (+1), Ramsey (+2), Yin (+5), Hedberg (+13).

==== Scorecard ====
Final round

Hole	1	2	3	4	5	6	7	8	9	10	11	12	13	14	15	16	17	18
Par	4	5	4	4	3	4	4	3	5	4	5	4	4	3	4	4	3	5
(South Korea) Park	−13	−14	−14	−14	−14	−13	−13	−14	−15	−14	−14	−15	−16	−16	−16	−16	−15	−15
(South Korea) Ryu	−4	−5	−5	−5	−5	−5	−5	−6	−6	−7	−8	−9	−9	−10	−10	−10	−10	−11
(Sweden) Hedwall	−5	−5	−4	−4	−4	−4	−4	−4	−5	−6	−8	−9	−9	−9	−9	−9	−9	−9
(Norway) Pettersen	−6	−6	−6	−6	−7	−7	−7	−6	−6	−7	−8	−8	−8	−7	−7	−8	−8	−9
(South Korea) Kang	−2	−3	−3	−3	−2	−2	−2	−3	−3	−4	−4	−3	−2	−3	−4	−5	−6	−6
(Australia) Webb	−6	−6	−6	−6	−5	−6	−6	−6	−7	−7	−7	−7	−7	−7	−7	−6	−6	−6
(United States) Salas	−7	−7	−7	−7	−7	−7	−7	−7	−7	−6	−6	−6	−5	−4	−4	−4	−2	−2

Cumulative tournament scores, relative to par

Eagle	Birdie	Bogey	Double bogey
