= Pure Silk-Bahamas LPGA Classic =

Golf tournament formerly on the LPGA Tour

Coordinates: 25°05′N 77°18′W

Tournament information
- Location: Paradise Island, Bahamas
- Established: 2013
- Course: Ocean Club Golf Course
- Par: 73
- Length: 6,644 yards (6,075 m)
- Tour: LPGA Tour
- Format: Stroke play - 72 holes
- Prize fund: $1.4 million
- Month played: January
- Final year: 2018

Tournament record score
- Aggregate: 266 Brittany Lincicome (2017)
- To par: −26 Brittany Lincicome (2017)

Current champion
- (United States) Brittany Lincicome

Location in Bahamas

The Pure Silk-Bahamas LPGA Classic was a women's professional golf tournament in The Bahamas on the LPGA Tour. It debuted in May 2013 at Ocean Club Golf Course on Paradise Island, adjacent to Nassau. Ilhee Lee won the inaugural event, two strokes ahead of Irene Cho.

== Winners ==
Year	Dates	Champion	Country	Winning score	To par	Margin of victory	Purse ($)	Winner's share ($)
2018	Jan 25–28	Brittany Lincicome (2)	United States	74-67-66=207	−12	2 strokes	1,400,000	210,000
2017	Jan 26–29	Brittany Lincicome	United States	64-65-69-68=266	−26	Playoff	1,400,000	210,000
2016	Jan 28–31	Kim Hyo-joo	South Korea	70-70-68-66=274	−18	2 strokes	1,400,000	210,000
2015	Feb 5–8	Kim Sei-young	South Korea	70-68-72-68=278	−14	Playoff	1,300,000	195,000
2014	Jan 23–26	Jessica Korda	United States	69-66-72-66=273	−19	1 stroke	1,300,000	195,000
2013	May 24–26*	Ilhee Lee	South Korea	41-43-42=126	−11	2 strokes	1,300,000	195,000

* The 2013 tournament was reduced to 36 holes played in three 12-hole rounds due to course flooding.
The original tournament dates in 2013 were May 23–26.

== Tournament records ==
Year	Player	Score	Round
2017	Lexi Thompson	61 (−12)	2nd
