= Oh Ji-young (golfer) =

South Korean professional golfer (born 1988)

Oh Ji-young 오지영
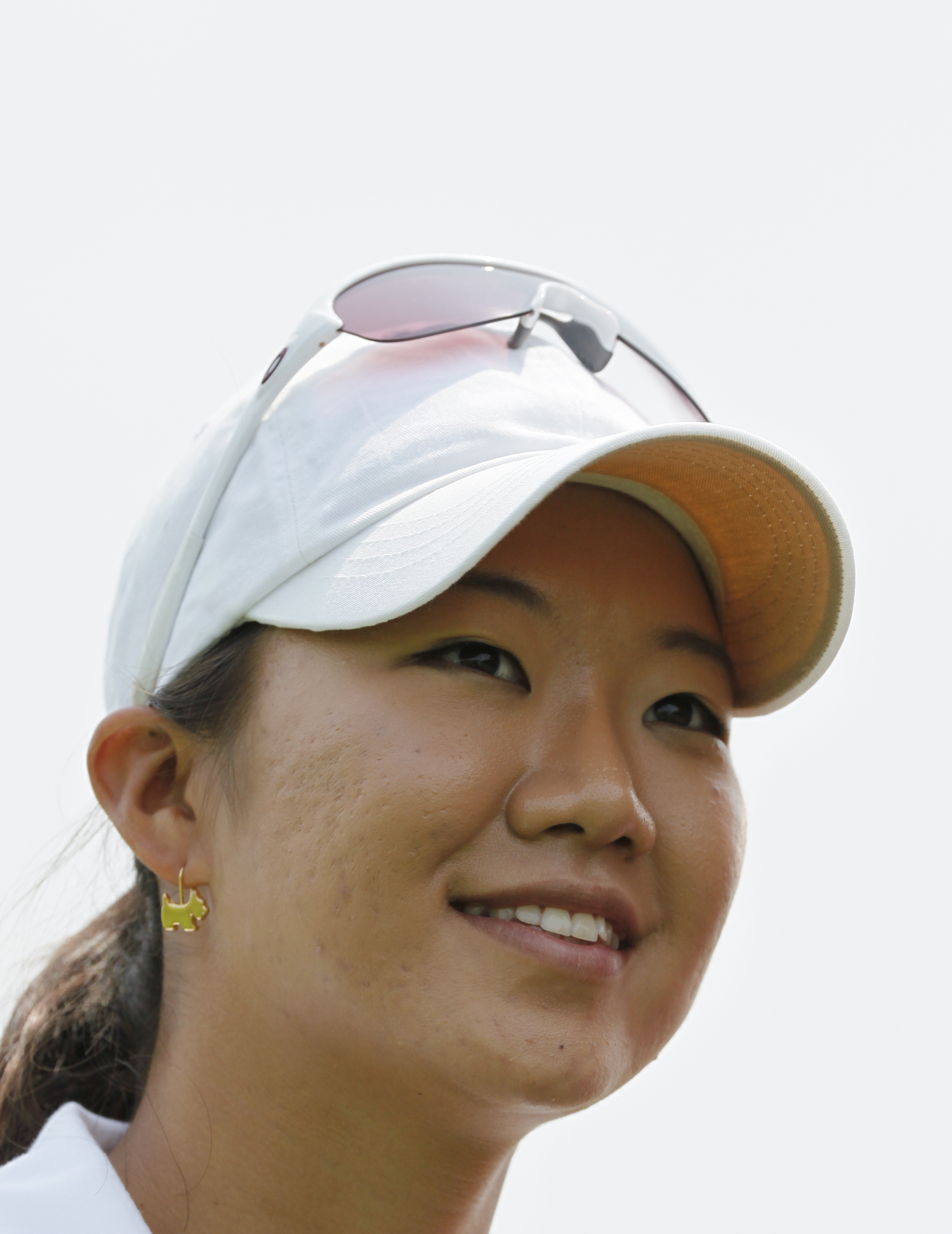
- Oh at the 2009 LPGA Championship

Personal information
- Nationality: South Korea
- Born: 3 July 1988 (age 38) Seoul, South Korea
- Height: 5 ft 7 in (1.70 m)

Career
- Sport: Golf
- Turned professional: 2006
- Former tour: LPGA Tour (2007–2017)
- Professional wins: 2

Number of wins by tour
- LPGA Tour: 2

Best results in LPGA major championships
- Chevron Championship: T31: 2008
- Women's PGA C'ship: T29: 2008
- U.S. Women's Open: T31: 2008
- Women's British Open: T17: 2008
- Evian Championship: T16: 2014

Oh Ji-young (Korean: 오지영, born 3 July 1988) is a South Korean professional golfer. She played on the LPGA Tour.

== Early life and amateur career ==
In 1988, Oh was born. She started playing golf at the age of 12 and was named to the Korean National Team in 2005 at the age of 16.

In 2006, she came to the United States and enrolled at the Leadbetter Academy. She played on the Future Collegians World Tour, a second tier amateur golf league, and won all six events she entered.

In the fall of 2006, she entered the LPGA Qualifying Tournament as an amateur and finished 9th, earning exempt status on the LPGA Tour for 2007.

== Professional career ==
Immediately after her success at 2007 LPGA Qualifying School she turned professional.

In 2007, her best finish was sixth at the Safeway Classic, where she carded a career-low 66 in the opening round.

In 2008, she earned her first win at the State Farm Classic beating top rookie Yani Tseng in a playoff.

In 2009, she gained her second win at the Sybase Classic.

== Professional wins (2) ==
=== LPGA Tour wins (2) ===
No.	Date	Tournament	Winning score	Margin of victory	Runner(s)-up
1	20 Jul 2008	LPGA State Farm Classic	−18 (66-66-69-69=270)	Playoff	(Taiwan) Yani Tseng
2	17 May 2009	Sybase Classic	−14 (66-69-69-70=274)	4 strokes	(Norway) Suzann Pettersen

LPGA Tour playoff record (1–0)

No.	Year	Tournament	Opponent(s)	Result
1	2008	LPGA State Farm Classic	(Taiwan) Yani Tseng	Won with par on first extra hole

== Results in LPGA majors ==
Results not in chronological order before 2015.

Tournament	2007	2008	2009	2010	2011	2012	2013	2014	2015	2016
ANA Inspiration		T31	T36	CUT	CUT	82	CUT	CUT	CUT	
Women's PGA Championship	T46	T29	T39	CUT	CUT	T45	T37	CUT	CUT	CUT
U.S. Women's Open	CUT	T31	T40	CUT			CUT		CUT	
Women's British Open	CUT	T17	CUT	T31			CUT	T58		
The Evian Championship ^							T44	T16		

^ The Evian Championship was added as a major in 2013.

Did not play

CUT = missed the half-way cut
"T" = tied

== LPGA Tour career summary ==
Year	Tournaments played	Cuts made	Wins	2nd	3rd	Top 10s	Best finish	Earnings ($)	Money list rank	Scoring average	Scoring rank
2007	22	10	0	0	0	1	6	148,876	72	72.46	81
2008	29	26	1	0	0	4	1	680,225	26	71.65	22
2009	25	20	1	0	0	3	1	558,316	24	71.90	34
2010	18	10	0	0	0	0	T12	98,384	71	73.42	92
2011	11	1	0	0	0	0	T54	5,456	148	74.42	125
2012	14	9	0	0	0	0	T42	41,391	109	73.25	82
2013	18	12	0	0	0	0	T35	84,879	87	72.56	70
2014	25	16	0	0	0	0	T16	173,090	73	71.95	56
2015	19	9	0	0	0	0	T25	55,173	110	72.54	81
2016	15	7	0	0	0	0	T26	32,008	136	72.86	110
2017	5	0	0	0	0	0	CUT	0	n/a	75.22	n/a

- Official as of the 2017 season
