= Inbee Park =

South Korean professional golfer (born 1988)

Inbee Park 박인비
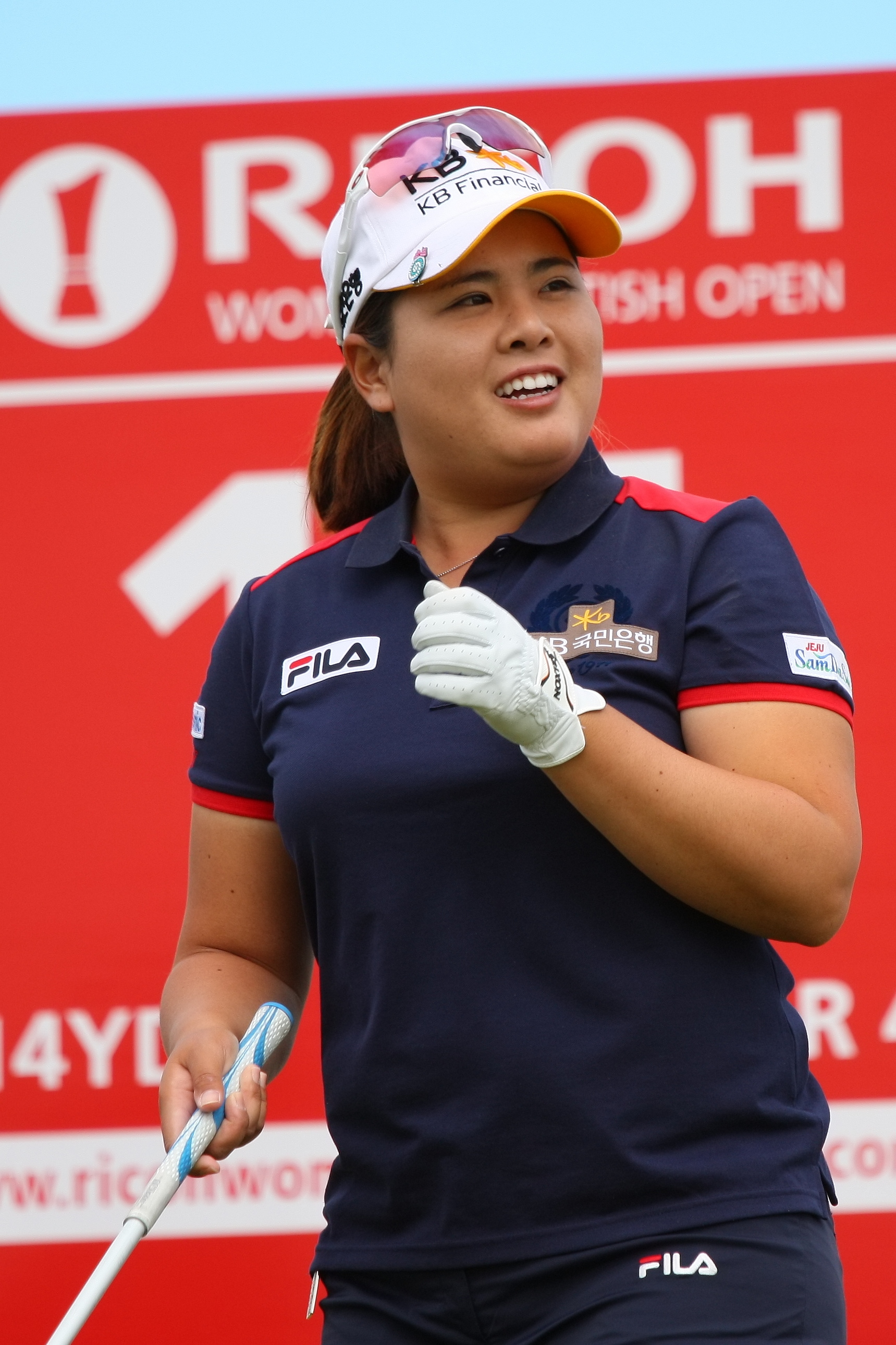
- Park at the 2013 Women's British Open

Personal information
- Nationality: South Korea
- Born: 12 July 1988 (age 38) Seoul, South Korea
- Height: 5 ft 6 in (168 cm)
- Spouse: Nam Ki-hyeop (m. 2014)
- Children: 2

Career
- Sport: Golf
- College: Kwangwoon University
- Turned professional: 2006
- Former tours: LPGA Tour (2007–2022); LPGA of Japan Tour; Futures Tour (2006)
- Professional wins: 31

Number of wins by tour
- LPGA Tour: 21
- Ladies European Tour: 3
- LPGA of Japan Tour: 4
- LPGA of Korea Tour: 1
- WPGA Tour of Australasia: 1
- Other: 4

Best results in LPGA major championships (wins: 7)
- Chevron Championship: Won: 2013
- Women's PGA C'ship: Won: 2013, 2014, 2015
- U.S. Women's Open: Won: 2008, 2013
- Women's British Open: Won: 2015
- Evian Championship: T8: 2015, 2018, 2019

Achievements and awards
- LPGA Vare Trophy: 2012, 2015
- LPGA Tour Money Winner: 2012, 2013
- LPGA Player of the Year: 2013
- GWAA Female Player of the Year: 2013
- Rolex Annika Major Award: 2015
- LPGA Hall of Fame: 2016
Medal record
Olympic Games
| Gold medal – first place | 2016 Rio de Janeiro | Individual |

- Inbee Park
- Hangul: 박인비
- Hanja: 朴仁妃
- RR: Bak Inbi
- MR: Pak Inbi

Inbee Park (Korean: 박인비; Hanja: 朴仁妃, pronounced [pɐɡinbi] or [pɐk̚] [inbi]; born 12 July 1988) is a South Korean professional golfer who played on the LPGA Tour and the LPGA of Japan Tour. She has been the number one ranked player in the Women's World Golf Rankings for four separate runs: April 2013 to June 2014, October 2014 to February 2015, June 2015 to October 2015, and from April to July 2018.

Park has won seven major championships in her career, including three consecutive major wins during the 2013 season, becoming only the fourth LPGA Tour player to win three majors in a calendar year. She is the youngest player to win the U.S. Women's Open and the second player, after Annika Sorenstam, to win the Women's PGA Championship three years in a row. Park is only the seventh player to win four different majors during her career and capture a career Grand Slam. In 2016, she won the first Olympic gold medal since 1900 in the women's individual tournament. Park has endorsement deals with KB Financial Group, Srixon, Panasonic, Lynx, Jeju Samdasoo & Mercedes-Benz.

== Early life and amateur career ==
In 1988, Park was born in Seoul, South Korea. She began playing golf at the age of 10.

Two years later, at age 12, she moved to the United States to pursue a golf career. She won nine events on the American Junior Golf Association (AJGA) circuit and was a five-time Rolex Junior All-American. She was a semifinalist at the 2003 U.S. Women's Amateur. She won the 2002 U.S. Girls' Junior and finished as runner-up in both 2003 and 2005.

While an amateur from 2004 through 2006, Park played in the Kraft Nabisco Championship as a sponsor invite and in the LPGA Takefuji Classic three times, recording two top-10 finishes.

Park graduated from Kwangwoon University in Seoul, Korea.

== Professional career ==
=== Futures Tour ===
In 2006, after graduating from Bishop Gorman High School in Las Vegas, Nevada, Park appealed to the LPGA for permission to attempt to qualify for the LPGA as a 17-year-old. LPGA rules generally require that a player be 18 to join the Tour. The LPGA denied Park's request, so she enrolled at the University of Nevada, Las Vegas but soon after dropped out and turned professional, playing on the Duramed Futures Tour where the age of entry had been lowered to 17 in late January. In 2006, she recorded 11 top-10 finishes on the Futures Tour. She finished third on its season-ending money list to earn exempt status on the LPGA Tour for the 2007 season.

=== LPGA Tour ===
During her rookie season in 2007, Park tied for fourth at the U.S. Women's Open and tied for second at the Safeway Classic. She finished 37th on the money list and fourth in the rookie of the year standings. In 2007, Park also changed the English spelling of her name from In-Bee to Inbee.

In 2008, Park won the U.S. Women's Open at Interlachen Country Club in Minnesota for her first LPGA win. At 19, she was the youngest player to win the title, and finished four strokes ahead of runner-up Helen Alfredsson.

After her breakout year in 2008, Park struggled in 2009, recording only four top-10 finishes and ending the season 50th on the LPGA official money list.

In 2010, Park had top-10 finishes in all four major tournaments, won twice on the LPGA of Japan Tour and finished the season ranked 12th in the world rankings.

Park's results in 2011 did not match those of the previous years. With no top-five finishes on the LPGA Tour, she sunk to 31st on the official money list and 27th in scoring average. She won once on the JLPGA Tour, at the Daikin Orchid Ladies.

Park bounced back from her 2011 slump in 2012. She had two wins on the LPGA Tour, finished in the top-three in 10 out of 23 tournaments she played, and topped the LPGA in both money earned and scoring average.

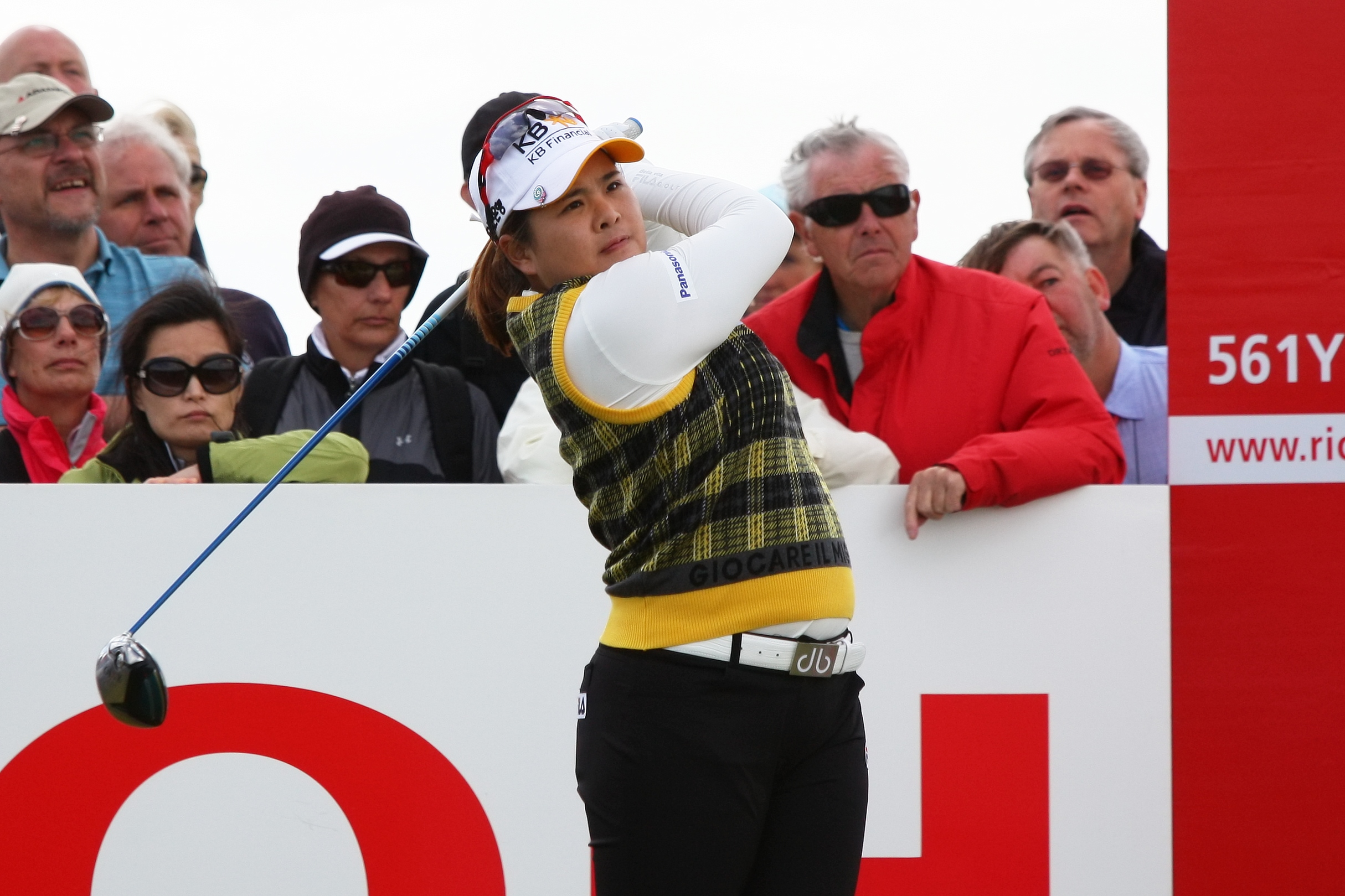
Park in 2013

Park won her fourth LPGA Tour event in the second tournament of the year at the Honda LPGA Thailand event by a single stroke. She shot a final round 67 to come from four back to finish a shot ahead of Ariya Jutanugarn.

In April, Park won her second major title with a four-stroke victory at the Kraft Nabisco Championship over compatriot Ryu So-Yeon. The following week, she became the top ranked golfer in the Women's World Golf Rankings.

Park won her sixth LPGA Tour title and third of the year a couple weeks later at the North Texas LPGA Shootout. She holed a four-foot birdie putt on the 72nd hole to edge out Carlota Ciganda by a stroke.

In June, Park won her second consecutive major of the year and third career major at the LPGA Championship at Locust Hill Country Club. After a 36-hole final day of regulation play, Park defeated Catriona Matthew on the third sudden-death playoff hole to clinch the victory. She started the third round a shot ahead of Morgan Pressel. Park became the seventh player in LPGA Tour history to win the year's opening two major championships.

Two weeks later, Park won her fifth title of the season at the Walmart NW Arkansas Championship when she defeated compatriot Ryu So-Yeon in a sudden-death playoff.

The following week, Park won her third consecutive major championship of the year and fourth career major at the U.S. Women's Open. The third consecutive major to start the season is a mark matched only by Babe Zaharias in 1950 when she won that season's only three majors. The victory was also the third consecutive for Park, a feat last accomplished on the LPGA Tour in 2008 by Lorena Ochoa when she won four consecutive tournaments. The victory was also her sixth championship overall in 2013.

In March, Park won the Mission Hills World Ladies Championship, an event on the Ladies European Tour. She won the event by five strokes over defending champion Suzann Pettersen. She also won the events team portion with fellow South Korean, Ryu So-Yeon. They won by twenty-eight strokes combined over the Chinese duo of Shanshan Feng and Xi Yu Lin. The team victory was her second at the event, as Park and teammate Kim Ha-Neul won the previous year.

In June, Park won her tenth title on the LPGA Tour when she grabbed victory at the Manulife Financial LPGA Classic. She won the event by three strokes over Cristie Kerr. The victory was the first on Tour for Park in almost a year when she won at the U.S. Women's Open.

In August, Park won her eleventh title on the LPGA Tour and her fifth major championships when she won the LPGA Championship in a sudden-death playoff over Brittany Lincicome. Park defeated Lincicome on the first extra hole with a par for her second consecutive LPGA Championship title.

Park won her 13th LPGA title in the first week of March. She shot a 66 in round one of the HSBC Women's Champions in Singapore and went wire-to-wire to win the championship. After shooting a bogey-free 65 in the final round of the Honda LPGA Thailand in Chonburi, she shot four straight bogey-free rounds in Singapore. Park, the world No. 2 in the Rolex Rankings, was paired with World No. 1 Lydia Ko and World No. 3 Stacy Lewis in the final round. Park had a two-shot lead heading into the final round and finished at 15-under-par with a final round 70. Ko finished two strokes behind Park.

Park won her 14th LPGA title at the Volunteers of America North Texas Shootout. She shot a bogey-free six-under 65 in the final round to defeat Cristie Kerr of the United States and Park Hee-Young of South Korea by three strokes.

In June, Park won her 15th title on the LPGA Tour and her sixth major championship when she won the Women's PGA Championship, five strokes ahead of runner-up Kim Sei-young. The victory made Park only the second player after Annika Sörenstam to achieve the feat of winning three consecutive Women's PGA Championships (formerly known as the LPGA Championship).

Park won her 16th title on the LPGA Tour at the Women's British Open, three strokes ahead of runner-up Ko Jin-young. It was her seventh major title and Park became the seventh player in history to win four different majors, completing a career Grand Slam (per the LPGA Tour policies regarding a career Grand Slam). It should be mentioned that the LPGA Tour decided to declare The Evian Championship a major starting in 2013, however, Inbee won the Evian Masters, as it was called at the time, in 2012. Many debated whether or not Park's 4 majors should be counted as a Career Grand Slam, but despite the discussions, the LPGA Tour officially stated that Inbee would be credited with accomplishing the rare feat.

Park went on to win for the fifth and final time in 2015 on 15 November, after a final round 64 at the Lorena Ochoa Invitational. She beat Carlota Ciganda by three strokes. The win was Park's 17th on the LPGA Tour. The following week a strong performance at the season's final event, Park would win her second career Vare Trophy (2012 her first) for the lowest scoring average for the season. The Vare Trophy accomplishment also put Park on the threshold for induction into the LPGA Hall of Fame. The trophy giving her the 27 points required for induction. Park will now have to finish the required ten seasons of play, a mark she is slated to meet in 2016.

Park was inducted into the LPGA Hall of Fame after competing in the KPMG Women's PGA Championship. At 27, she is the youngest player to be inducted.

In August, Park became the first woman in 116 years to win an Olympic gold medal in golf, defeating world number 1 Lydia Ko by five strokes. This was one of the first Olympic gold medals given out in golf since the 1904 Summer Olympics. Unlike other sports such as professional tennis, the LPGA Tour will not consider an Olympic gold medal as a Tour title.

In March, Park won the HSBC Women's Champions, and in the process scored a course record of 64 in the final round. The win was Park's 18th Tour title at only 28 years, 7 months and 21 days of age.

In March, Park won the Bank of Hope Founders Cup, marking the third time a South Korean player has won the competition that was created in 2011. It was her first win since the HSBC Women's Champions in March last year and was her 19th tour title. Park was sidelined by injuries since August 2017.

In April 2018, Park finished as a runner-up at the ANA Inspiration, after losing in a sudden-death playoff to Pernilla Lindberg. She came from four strokes behind in the final round to make the playoff alongside Lindberg and Jennifer Song. The playoff needed eight extra holes, over two days, to be decided, before Lindberg claimed victory with a birdie on the eighth extra hole. Park regained the World number 1 spot from Shanshan Feng after she finished tied for 2nd at the Hugel-JTBC LA Open in late April.

In February 2020, Park won the ISPS Handa Women's Australian Open by 3 strokes over Amy Olson.

In March 2021, Park won the Kia Classic in Carlsbad, California on the LPGA Tour for her 21st career victory.

== Personal life ==
Park and coach Nam Ki-hyeop got married in 2014. She gave birth to her first daughter in April 2023 and her second daughter in October 2024.

== Professional wins (31) ==
=== LPGA Tour wins (21) ===
Legend
Major championships (7)
Other LPGA Tour (14)

| No. | Date | Tournament | Winning score | To par | Margin of victory | Runner(s)-up | Winner's share ($) |
|---|---|---|---|---|---|---|---|
| 1 | 29 Jun 2008 | U.S. Women's Open | 72-69-71-71=283 | −9 | 4 strokes | (Sweden) Helen Alfredsson | 585,000 |
| 2 | 29 Jul 2012 | Evian Masters | 71-64-70-66=271 | −17 | 2 strokes | (United States) Stacy Lewis (Australia) Karrie Webb | 487,500 |
| 3 | 14 Oct 2012 | Sime Darby LPGA Malaysia | 69-68-65-67=269 | −15 | 2 strokes | (South Korea) Choi Na-Yeon | 285,000 |
| 4 | 24 Feb 2013 | Honda LPGA Thailand | 67-71-71-67=276 | −12 | 1 stroke | (Thailand) Ariya Jutanugarn | 225,000 |
| 5 | 7 Apr 2013 | Kraft Nabisco Championship | 70-67-67-69=273 | −15 | 4 strokes | (South Korea) Ryu So-Yeon | 300,000 |
| 6 | 28 Apr 2013 | North Texas LPGA Shootout | 67-70-67-67=271 | −13 | 1 stroke | (Spain) Carlota Ciganda | 195,000 |
| 7 | 9 Jun 2013 | Wegmans LPGA Championship | 72-68-68-75=283 | −5 | Playoff | (Scotland) Catriona Matthew | 337,500 |
| 8 | 23 Jun 2013 | Walmart NW Arkansas Championship | 69-65-67=201 | −12 | Playoff | (South Korea) Ryu So-Yeon | 300,000 |
| 9 | 30 Jun 2013 | U.S. Women's Open (2) | 67-68-71-74=280 | −8 | 4 strokes | (South Korea) In-Kyung Kim | 585,000 |
| 10 | 8 Jun 2014 | Manulife Financial LPGA Classic | 69-66-65-61=261 | −23 | 3 strokes | (United States) Cristie Kerr | 225,000 |
| 11 | 17 Aug 2014 | Wegmans LPGA Championship (2) | 72-66-69-70=277 | −11 | Playoff | (United States) Brittany Lincicome | 337,500 |
| 12 | 2 Nov 2014 | Fubon LPGA Taiwan Championship | 64-62-69-71=266 | −22 | 2 strokes | (United States) Stacy Lewis | 300,000 |
| 13 | 8 Mar 2015 | HSBC Women's Champions | 66-69-68-70=273 | −15 | 2 strokes | (New Zealand) Lydia Ko | 210,000 |
| 14 | 3 May 2015 | Volunteers of America North Texas Shootout (2) | 69-66-69-65=269 | −15 | 3 strokes | (United States) Cristie Kerr (South Korea) Hee Young Park | 195,000 |
| 15 | 14 Jun 2015 | KPMG Women's PGA Championship (3) | 71-68-66-68=273 | −19 | 5 strokes | (South Korea) Kim Sei-young | 525,000 |
| 16 | 2 Aug 2015 | Ricoh Women's British Open | 69-73-69-65=276 | −12 | 3 strokes | (South Korea) Ko Jin-young | 464,817 |
| 17 | 15 Nov 2015 | Lorena Ochoa Invitational | 68-71-67-64=270 | −18 | 3 strokes | (Spain) Carlota Ciganda | 200,000 |
| 18 | 5 Mar 2017 | HSBC Women's Champions (2) | 67-67-71-64=269 | −19 | 1 stroke | (Thailand) Ariya Jutanugarn | 225,000 |
| 19 | 18 Mar 2018 | Bank of Hope Founders Cup | 68-71-63-67=269 | –19 | 5 strokes | (United States) Marina Alex (England) Laura Davies (Thailand) Ariya Jutanugarn | 225,000 |
| 20 | 16 Feb 2020 | ISPS Handa Women's Australian Open^ | 67-69-68-74=278 | −14 | 3 strokes | (United States) Amy Olson | 195,000 |
| 21 | 28 Mar 2021 | Kia Classic | 66-69-69-70=274 | −14 | 5 strokes | (United States) Amy Olson (United States) Lexi Thompson | 270,000 |

^Co-sanctioned with the ALPG Tour

LPGA Tour playoff record (3–5)

| No. | Year | Tournament | Opponent(s) | Result |
|---|---|---|---|---|
| 1 | 2012 | Manulife Financial LPGA Classic | (South Korea) Chella Choi (United States) Brittany Lang (South Korea) Hee Kyung Seo | Lang won with birdie on third extra hole Park eliminated by birdie on second hole Choi eliminated by birdie on first hole |
| 2 | 2013 | LPGA Championship | (Scotland) Catriona Matthew | Won with birdie on third extra hole |
| 3 | 2013 | Walmart NW Arkansas Championship | (South Korea) Ryu So-Yeon | Won with birdie on first extra hole |
| 4 | 2014 | Meijer LPGA Classic | (South Korea) Mirim Lee | Lost to birdie on second extra hole |
| 5 | 2014 | LPGA Championship | (United States) Brittany Lincicome | Won with par on first extra hole |
| 6 | 2015 | LPGA Lotte Championship | (South Korea) Kim Sei-young | Lost to eagle on first extra hole |
| 7 | 2018 | ANA Inspiration | (Sweden) Pernilla Lindberg (United States) Jennifer Song | Lindberg won with birdie on eighth extra hole Song eliminated by birdie on third hole |
| 8 | 2020 | Diamond Resorts Tournament of Champions | (Japan) Nasa Hataoka (Mexico) Gaby López | López won with birdie on seventh extra hole Park eliminated by par on third hole |

=== JLPGA Tour wins (4) ===
| No. | Date | Tournament | Winning score | To par | Margin of victory | Runner(s)-up |
|---|---|---|---|---|---|---|
| 1 | 29 Jun 2010 | Nishijin Ladies Classic | 69-71-69=209 | −7 | Playoff | (Japan) Chieko Amanuma |
| 2 | 28 Nov 2010 | Japan LPGA Tour Championship Ricoh Cup | 72-72-70-73=287 | −1 | 4 strokes | (South Korea) Ahn Sun-ju (Japan) Mika Miyazato |
| 3 | 6 Mar 2011 | Daikin Orchid Ladies | 72-67-66=205 | −11 | 3 strokes | (Japan) Miki Saiki |
| 4 | 13 May 2012 | Fundokin Ladies | 70-69-68=207 | −9 | 2 strokes | (China) Shanshan Feng |

=== LPGA of Korea Tour wins (1) ===
| No. | Date | Tournament | Winning score | To par | Margin of victory | Runner(s)-up |
|---|---|---|---|---|---|---|
| 1 | 20 May 2018 | Doosan Match Play Championship | 1 up | | | (South Korea) Kim A Lim |

=== Ladies European Tour wins (3) ===
| No. | Date | Tournament | Winning score | To par | Margin of victory | Runner(s)-up |
|---|---|---|---|---|---|---|
| 1 | 29 Jul 2012 | Evian Masters | 71-64-70-66=271 | −17 | 2 strokes | (United States) Stacy Lewis (Australia) Karrie Webb |
| 2 | 9 Mar 2014 | Mission Hills World Ladies Championship (individual) | 69-70-62-67=268 | −24 | 5 strokes | (Norway) Suzann Pettersen |
| 3 | 2 Aug 2015 | Ricoh Women's British Open | 69-73-69-65=276 | −12 | 3 strokes | (South Korea) Ko Jin-young |

=== Other wins (4) ===
- 2013 Mission Hills World Ladies Championship – team (with Kim Ha-neul)
- 2014 Mission Hills World Ladies Championship – team (with Ryu So-yeon)
- 2015 World Ladies Championship – team (with Ryu So-yeon)
- 2016 Olympic Games

== Major championships ==
=== Wins (7) ===
| Year | Championship | 54 holes | Winning score | Margin | Runner-up |
|---|---|---|---|---|---|
| 2008 | U.S. Women's Open | 2 shot deficit | −9 (72-69-71-71=283) | 4 strokes | (Sweden) Helen Alfredsson |
| 2013 | Kraft Nabisco Championship | 3 shot lead | −15 (70-67-67-69=273) | 4 strokes | (South Korea) Ryu So-Yeon |
| 2013 | LPGA Championship | 1 shot lead | −5 (72-68-68-75=283) | Playoff^{1} | (Scotland) Catriona Matthew |
| 2013 | U.S. Women's Open | 4 shot lead | −8 (67-68-71-74=280) | 4 strokes | (South Korea) In-Kyung Kim |
| 2014 | LPGA Championship | 1 shot deficit | −11 (72-66-69-70=277) | Playoff^{2} | (United States) Brittany Lincicome |
| 2015 | Women's PGA Championship | 2 shot lead | −19 (71-68-66-68=273) | 5 strokes | (South Korea) Kim Sei-young |
| 2015 | Ricoh Women's British Open | 3 shot deficit | −12 (69-73-69-65=276) | 3 strokes | (South Korea) Ko Jin-young |

^{1} Defeated Matthew at the third hole of a sudden-death playoff: Park (4-4-3) and Matthew (4-4-x).
^{2} Defeated Lincicome at the first hole of a sudden-death playoff: Park (4) and Lincicome (5).

=== Results timeline ===
Results not in chronological order.

| Tournament | 2004 | 2005 | 2006 | 2007 | 2008 | 2009 | 2010 | 2011 | 2012 |
|---|---|---|---|---|---|---|---|---|---|
| Chevron Championship | | | T62 | | 9 | T56 | T10 | T29 | T26 |
| U.S. Women's Open | CUT | | | T4 | 1 | T26 | T8 | T6 | T9 |
| Women's PGA Championship | | | | T62 | T46 | T14 | T7 | T14 | T9 |
| Women's British Open | | | | T11 | CUT | T24 | T9 | T7 | 2 |

| Tournament | 2013 | 2014 | 2015 | 2016 | 2017 | 2018 | 2019 | 2020 | 2021 | 2022 |
|---|---|---|---|---|---|---|---|---|---|---|
| Chevron Championship | 1 | 38 | T11 | T6 | T3 | T2 | T68 | T37 | T7 | T35 |
| U.S. Women's Open | 1 | T43 | T3 | | CUT | 9 | T16 | T6 | T7 | |
| Women's PGA Championship | 1 | 1 | 1 | CUT | T7 | CUT | T7 | 2 | T40 | T25 |
| The Evian Championship^ | T67 | T10 | T8 | | | T8 | T8 | NT | T12 | CUT |
| Women's British Open | T42 | 4 | 1 | | T11 | CUT | CUT | 4 | T52 | T22 |

^ The Evian Championship was added as a major in 2013

Win
Top 10
Did not play

CUT = missed the half-way cut
NT = no tournament
T = tied

=== Summary ===
| Tournament | Wins | 2nd | 3rd | Top-5 | Top-10 | Top-25 | Events | Cuts made |
|---|---|---|---|---|---|---|---|---|
| Chevron Championship | 1 | 1 | 1 | 3 | 7 | 8 | 16 | 16 |
| U.S. Women's Open | 2 | 0 | 1 | 4 | 10 | 11 | 15 | 13 |
| Women's PGA Championship | 3 | 1 | 0 | 4 | 8 | 11 | 16 | 14 |
| The Evian Championship | 0 | 0 | 0 | 0 | 4 | 5 | 7 | 6 |
| Women's British Open | 1 | 1 | 0 | 5 | 6 | 10 | 15 | 12 |
| Totals | 7 | 3 | 2 | 16 | 35 | 45 | 69 | 61 |

- Most consecutive cuts made – 32 (2009 Kraft Nabisco – 2016 ANA)
- Longest streak of top-10s – 6 (2012 LPGA – 2013 U.S. Open)

== LPGA Tour career summary ==
| Year | Starts | Cuts made* | Wins | 2nd | 3rd | Top-10 | Best finish | Earnings ($) | Money list rank | Scoring average | Scoring rank |
|---|---|---|---|---|---|---|---|---|---|---|---|
| 2004 | 2 | 1 | 0 | 0 | 0 | 1 | T8 | n/a | n/a | 72.60 | n/a |
| 2005 | 2 | 1 | 0 | 0 | 0 | 1 | 5 | n/a | n/a | 71.00 | n/a |
| 2006 | 2 | 2 | 0 | 0 | 0 | 0 | T35 | n/a | n/a | 73.86 | n/a |
| 2007 | 26 | 18 | 0 | 1 | 0 | 2 | T2 | 380,263 | 37 | 73.19 | 72 |
| 2008 | 26 | 22 | 1 | 0 | 1 | 7 | 1 | 1,138,370 | 8 | 71.78 | 26 |
| 2009 | 23 | 16 | 0 | 0 | 0 | 2 | T5 | 271,303 | 50 | 72.55 | 67 |
| 2010 | 19 | 19 | 0 | 1 | 1 | 11 | 2 | 825,477 | 11 | 70.83 | 9 |
| 2011 | 16 | 15 | 0 | 0 | 0 | 3 | T6 | 365,231 | 31 | 72.00 | 27 |
| 2012 | 24 | 23 | 2 | 6 | 1 | 12 | 1 | 2,287,080 | 1 | 70.21 | 1 |
| 2013 | 23 | 22 | 6 | 0 | 1 | 11 | 1 | 2,456,619 | 1 | 69.87 | 3 |
| 2014 | 23 | 22 | 3 | 2 | 4 | 17 | 1 | 2,226,641 | 2 | 69.68 | 2 |
| 2015 | 25 | 23 | 5 | 1 | 1 | 15 | 1 | 2,630,011 | 2 | 69.41 | 1 |
| 2016 | 10 | 5 | 0 | 1 | 0 | 2 | 2 | 253,381 | 69 | 72.19 | 76 |
| 2017 | 15 | 14 | 1 | 0 | 1 | 5 | 1 | 755,651 | 25 | 69.67 | 5 |
| 2018 | 13 | 11 | 1 | 2 | 1 | 6 | 1 | 979,527 | 15 | 70.17 | 11 |
| 2019 | 17 | 16 | 0 | 2 | 0 | 6 | T2 | 781,166 | 26 | 70.08 | 14 |
| 2020 | 13 | 10 | 1 | 3 | 0 | 8 | 1 | 1,377,799 | 3 | 70.07 | 3 |
| 2021 | 17 | 17 | 1 | 2 | 1 | 8 | 1 | 1,116,295 | 12 | 69.53 | 5 |
| 2022 | 15 | 10 | 0 | 0 | 1 | 3 | T3 | 417,530 | 62 | 70.94 | 44 |
| Totals^ | 305 (2007) | 263 (2007) | 21 | 21 | 13 | 118 (2007) | 1 | 18,262,344 | 4 | | |

^ Official as of the 2022 season
* Includes matchplay and other events without a cut.

== Futures Tour summary ==
| Year | Tournaments played | Cuts made | Wins | 2nd | 3rd | Top 10s | Best finish | Earnings ($) | Money list rank | Scoring average | Scoring rank |
|---|---|---|---|---|---|---|---|---|---|---|---|
| 2006 | 17 | 16 | 0 | 1 | 4 | 11 | 2 | 49,079 | 3 | 71.12 | 2 |

== World ranking ==
Position in Women's World Golf Rankings at the end of each calendar year.

| Year | World ranking | Source |
|---|---|---|
| 2006 | 321 | |
| 2007 | 70 | |
| 2008 | 21 | |
| 2009 | 42 | |
| 2010 | 12 | |
| 2011 | 23 | |
| 2012 | 4 | |
| 2013 | 1 | |
| 2014 | 1 | |
| 2015 | 2 | |
| 2016 | 11 | |
| 2017 | 13 | |
| 2018 | 4 | |
| 2019 | 14 | |
| 2020 | 3 | |
| 2021 | 5 | |
| 2022 | 36 | |

== Team appearances ==
Professional

- Lexus Cup (representing Asia team): 2008
- International Crown (representing South Korea): 2014

== See also ==
- List of golfers with most LPGA major championship wins
- List of golfers with most LPGA Tour wins
