= 2013 LPGA Tour =

Golf tour season

2013 LPGA Tour season
- Duration: February 14, 2013 – November 24, 2013
- Number of official events: 29
- Most wins: 6 (South Korea) Inbee Park
- Money leader: (South Korea) Inbee Park
- Rolex Player of the Year: (South Korea) Inbee Park
- Vare Trophy: (United States) Stacy Lewis
- Rookie of the Year: (Thailand) Moriya Jutanugarn

The 2013 LPGA Tour was a series of weekly golf tournaments for elite female golfers from around the world. The Tour began in Australia on February 14 and ended on November 24 in Florida. The tournaments were sanctioned by the United States–based Ladies Professional Golf Association (LPGA).

Inbee Park of South Korea won the most tournaments, six, including three majors. She also led the money list for the second straight year and won the Rolex Player of the Year award. Stacy Lewis won the Vare Trophy for lowest scoring average, the first American to win since 1994. Three players, Lewis, Park, and Suzann Pettersen had scoring averages below 70, for the first time in LPGA Tour history. Moriya Jutanugarn of Thailand won the Rookie of the Year award.

== Schedule and results ==
The number in parentheses after winners' names is the player's total number wins in official money individual events on the LPGA Tour, including that event.

Date	Tournament	Location	Winner	Purse ($)	First prize ($)	Titleholders qualifiers	WWGR points
Feb 17	ISPS Handa Women's Australian Open	Australia	(South Korea) Jiyai Shin (11)	1,200,000	180,000	(South Korea) Jiyai Shin (Taiwan) Yani Tseng (Thailand) Moriya Jutanugarn	37
Feb 24	Honda LPGA Thailand	Thailand	(South Korea) Inbee Park (4)	1,500,000	225,000	(South Korea) Inbee Park (South Korea) So Yeon Ryu (Spain) Beatriz Recari	62
Mar 3	HSBC Women's Champions	Singapore	(United States) Stacy Lewis (6)	1,400,000	210,000	(United States) Stacy Lewis (South Korea) Na Yeon Choi (United States) Paula Creamer	56
Mar 17	RR Donnelley LPGA Founders Cup	Arizona	(United States) Stacy Lewis (7)	1,500,000	225,000	(Japan) Ai Miyazato (United States) Angela Stanford (United States) Jessica Korda	62
Mar 24	Kia Classic	California	(Spain) Beatriz Recari (2)	1,700,000	255,000	(South Korea) I.K. Kim (Thailand) Pornanong Phatlum (United States) Mo Martin	62
Apr 7	Kraft Nabisco Championship	California	(South Korea) Inbee Park (5)	2,000,000	300,000	(Sweden) Caroline Hedwall (Norway) Suzann Pettersen (South Korea) Haeji Kang	100
Apr 20	LPGA Lotte Championship	Hawaii	(Norway) Suzann Pettersen (11)	1,700,000	255,000	(United States) Lizette Salas (China) Shanshan Feng (South Korea) Hee-Kyung Seo	62
Apr 28	North Texas LPGA Shootout	Texas	(South Korea) Inbee Park (6)	1,300,000	195,000	(Spain) Carlota Ciganda (South Korea) Hee-Young Park (France) Karine Icher	62
May 5	Kingsmill Championship	Virginia	(United States) Cristie Kerr (16)	1,300,000	195,000	(United States) Cristie Kerr (South Korea) Ilhee Lee (United States) Gerina Piller	62
May 19	Mobile Bay LPGA Classic	Alabama	(United States) Jennifer Johnson (1)	1,200,000	180,000	(United States) Jennifer Johnson (Australia) Karrie Webb (Sweden) Anna Nordqvist	31
May 26	Pure Silk-Bahamas LPGA Classic	Bahamas	(South Korea) Ilhee Lee (1)	1,300,000	195,000	(United States) Irene Cho (Japan) Mika Miyazato (United States) Mindy Kim	56
Jun 2	ShopRite LPGA Classic	New Jersey	(Australia) Karrie Webb (39)	1,500,000	225,000	(South Korea) Jenny Shin (South Korea) Jeong Jang (Japan) Chie Arimura	62
Jun 9	Wegmans LPGA Championship	New York	(South Korea) Inbee Park (7)	2,250,000	337,500	(Scotland) Catriona Matthew (United States) Morgan Pressel (South Korea) Amy Yang	100
Jun 23	Walmart NW Arkansas Championship	Arkansas	(South Korea) Inbee Park (8)	2,000,000	300,000	(United States) Brittany Lang (United States) Juli Inkster (United States) Brooke Pancake	62
Jun 30	U.S. Women's Open	New York	(South Korea) Inbee Park (9)	3,250,000	585,000	(England) Jodi Ewart Shadoff (United States) Brittany Lincicome (United States) Lexi Thompson	100
Jul 14	Manulife Financial LPGA Classic	Ontario	(South Korea) Hee-Young Park (2)	1,300,000	195,000	(South Korea) Meena Lee (United States) Austin Ernst (South Korea) Hanna Kang	56
Jul 21	Marathon Classic	Ohio	(Spain) Beatriz Recari (3)	1,300,000	195,000	(United States) Jacqui Concolino (South Korea) Se Ri Pak (South Korea) Chella Choi	46
Aug 4	Ricoh Women's British Open	Scotland	(United States) Stacy Lewis (8)	2,750,000	402,584	(United States) Natalie Gulbis (United States) Nicole Castrale (Sweden) Pernilla Lindberg	100
Aug 18	Solheim Cup	Colorado	(European Union) Europe	n/a			
Aug 25	CN Canadian Women's Open	Alberta	(New Zealand) Lydia Ko (2) (a)	2,000,000	300,000	(New Zealand) Lydia Ko (a) (United States) Stacy Prammanasudh (Germany) Caroline Masson	68
Sep 1	Safeway Classic	Oregon	(Norway) Suzann Pettersen (12)	1,300,000	195,000	(Germany) Sandra Gal (United States) Sandra Changkija (Netherlands) Dewi Claire Schreefel	46
Sep 15	The Evian Championship	France	(Norway) Suzann Pettersen (13)	3,250,000	487,500	(Canada) Rebecca Lee-Bentham (United States) Cindy LaCrosse (Australia) Katherine Hull-Kirk	100
Oct 6	Reignwood LPGA Classic	China	(China) Shanshan Feng (2)	1,800,000	270,000	(Netherlands) Christel Boeljon (South Korea) Sun Young Yoo (Colombia) Paola Moreno	40
Oct 13	Sime Darby LPGA Malaysia	Malaysia	(United States) Lexi Thompson (2)	2,000,000	300,000	(United States) Alison Walshe (United States) Michelle Wie (United States) Jane Park	62
Oct 20	LPGA KEB-HanaBank Championship	South Korea	(South Korea) Amy Yang (1)	1,900,000	285,000	(South Korea) Eun-Hee Ji (Japan) Ayako Uehara (United States) Candie Kung	56
Oct 27	Sunrise LPGA Taiwan Championship	Taiwan	(Norway) Suzann Pettersen (14)	2,000,000	300,000	(Spain) Azahara Muñoz (United States) Mina Harigae (South Korea) M.J. Hur	31
Nov 10	Mizuno Classic	Japan	(Taiwan) Teresa Lu (1)	1,200,000	180,000	(Taiwan) Teresa Lu (Japan) Haru Nomura (South Korea) Hee-Won Han	28
Nov 17	Lorena Ochoa Invitational	Mexico	(United States) Lexi Thompson (3)	1,000,000	200,000	None	37
Nov 24	CME Group Titleholders	Florida	(China) Shanshan Feng (3)	2,000,000	700,000	n/a	62

== Season leaders ==
Money list leaders

Rank	Player	Country	Earnings ($)	Events played
1	Inbee Park	South Korea	2,456,619	23
2	Suzann Pettersen	Norway	2,296,106	23
3	Stacy Lewis	United States	1,938,868	26
4	Shanshan Feng	China	1,716,657	19
5	So Yeon Ryu	South Korea	1,278,864	24
6	Lexi Thompson	United States	1,206,109	24
7	I.K. Kim	South Korea	1,125,389	23
8	Beatriz Recari	Spain	1,030,614	25
9	Na Yeon Choi	South Korea	929,964	24
10	Hee Young Park	South Korea	848,676	26

Full 2013 Official Money List

Scoring average leaders

Rank	Player	Country	Average
1	Stacy Lewis	United States	69.48
2	Suzann Pettersen	Norway	69.70
3	Inbee Park	South Korea	69.87
4	So Yeon Ryu	South Korea	70.29
5	Na Yeon Choi	South Korea	70.31

Full 2013 Scoring Average List

== See also ==
- 2013 Ladies European Tour
- 2013 Symetra Tour
