= Brittany Lincicome =

American professional golfer (born 1985)

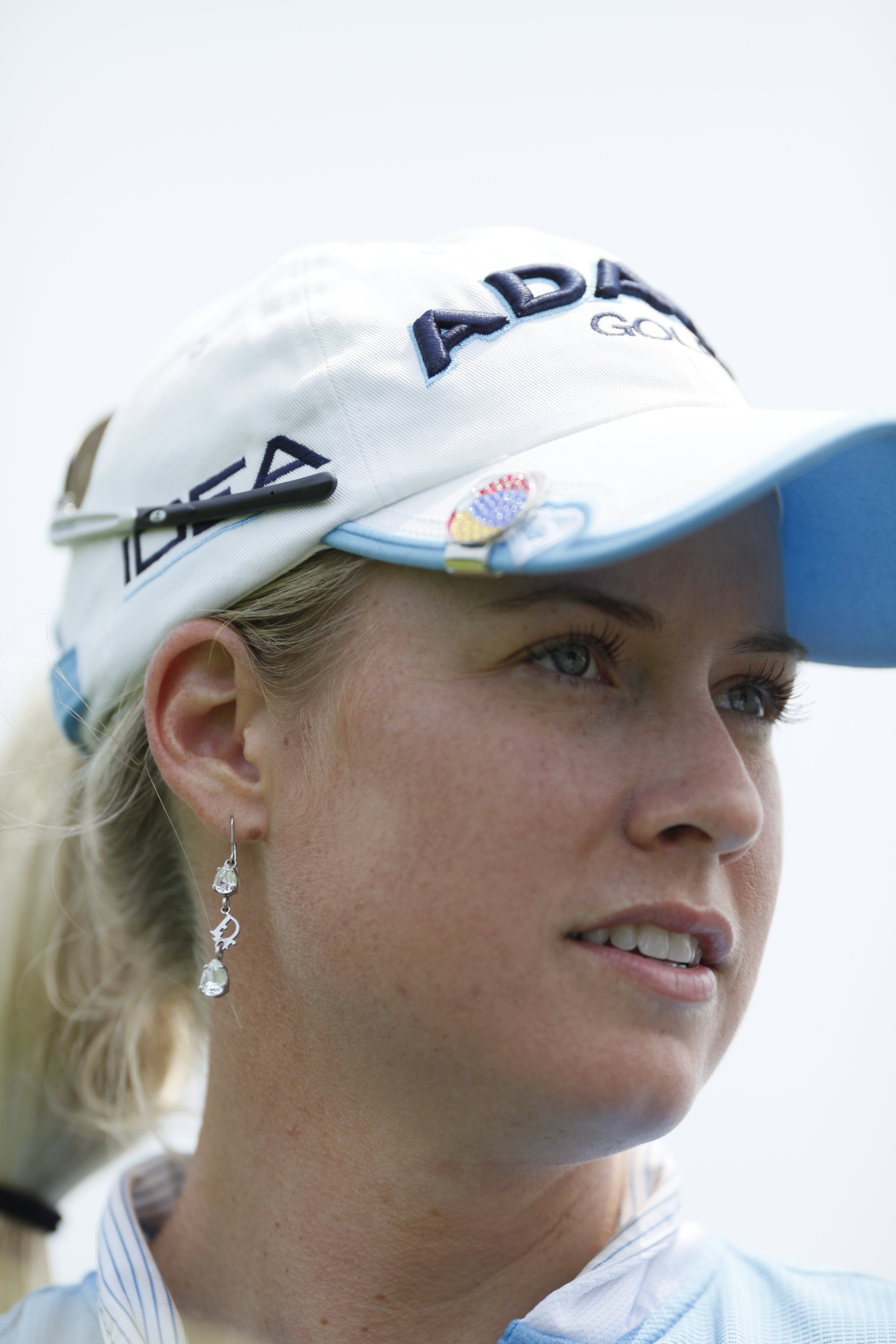
- Lincicome at the 2009 LPGA Championship

Personal information
- Full name: Brittany Grace Lincicome
- Nickname: Bam Bam
- Nationality: United States
- Born: September 19, 1985 (age 41) St. Petersburg, Florida, U.S.
- Height: 5 ft 10 in (1.78 m)

Career
- Sport: Golf
- Turned professional: 2004
- Current tour: LPGA Tour (joined 2005)
- Professional wins: 8

Number of wins by tour
- LPGA Tour: 8

Best results in LPGA major championships (wins: 2)
- Chevron Championship: Won: 2009, 2015
- Women's PGA C'ship: 2nd: 2014
- U.S. Women's Open: 5th: 2009
- Women's British Open: T9: 2010
- Evian Championship: T8: 2014

Brittany Grace Lincicome (born September 19, 1985) is an American professional golfer who plays on the LPGA Tour. Lincicome is one of the longest drivers in the history of women's golf. In her rookie year, 2005, she led the LPGA in driving distance with an average of 270.3 yards (247.2 m). In 2006, her driving average increased to 278.6 yards (254.8 m), second among all LPGA players. Her prodigious length off the tee has earned her the nickname "Bam-Bam." Lincicome has won two major championships: the 2009 Kraft Nabisco Championship and the 2015 ANA Inspiration.

== Early life and amateur career ==
In 1985, Lincicome was born in St. Petersburg, Florida. She participated in more than 100 amateur events. Her wins included the American Junior Golf Association Chateu Elan in 2001 and 2003 and the Avilla Junior Classic in 2003. In 2004, she won the Harder Hall Invitational.

Lincicome also competed in both the 2004 U.S. Women's Open and the 2004 State Farm Classic on the LPGA Tour as an amateur, even leading the former after the first round.

== Professional career ==
In December 2004, at the age of 19, Lincicome turned professional. She finshed in 20th place at the LPGA Final Qualifying Tournament to earn her tour card for 2005. Home-schooled, she had graduated from high school the previous spring. Her first victory was in the 2006 HSBC Women's World Match Play Championship, where she defeated Michelle Wie in the quarterfinals, Lorena Ochoa in the semifinals, and Juli Inkster in the final match. She captured her second win in April 2007 at the Ginn Open, again holding off Ochoa to capture the victory on the 72nd hole.

In 2007, Lincicome earned a spot on the U.S. Solheim Cup team for the first time. In singles play, she lost to Laura Davies. Years earlier, as a 12-year-old, Lincicome had carried the scoring sign for Davies at the JCPenney Classic LPGA event, leading Davies to good-naturedly refer to Lincicome as "Sign Girl."

In 2009, Lincicome won the Kraft Nabisco Championship, an LPGA major, after making an eagle on the final hole to leap frog Kristy McPherson, who held a one shot lead going into the final hole.

In August 2014, Lincicome lost a sudden-death playoff with Inbee Park at the LPGA Championship. She had held a one shot lead coming to the 72nd hole, but made bogey to fall back into a playoff. Lincicome lost the playoff at the first extra hole when she could only make a bogey to Park's par.

Lincicome won her second major championship in April 2015, with a victory at the ANA Inspiration, the second time she had won this major. She moved into a tie for the lead after eagling the 72nd hole in regulation play, just as she had done when winning the title in 2009. Lincicome prevailed in a sudden-death playoff over fellow American Stacy Lewis, winning with a par on the third extra hole.

In 2018, Lincicome was granted a sponsor's exemption into the Barbasol Championship on the PGA Tour. This made her the fifth woman to play in a PGA Tour sanctioned event, the first since Michelle Wie in 2008. Lincicome missed the cut by 9 shots, scoring 78 (+6) and 71 (−1), her second round making her the second woman to break par on a PGA Tour event.

Lincicome retired following the 2024 season but has continued to play a few events each year.

== Personal life ==
She resides in Gulfport, Florida.

== Professional wins (8) ==
=== LPGA Tour wins (8) ===
Legend
Major championships (2)
Other LPGA Tour (6)

| No. | Date | Tournament | Winning score | To par | Margin of victory | Runner(s)-up | Winner's share ($) |
|---|---|---|---|---|---|---|---|
| 1 | Jul 9, 2006 | HSBC Women's World Match Play Championship | 3 & 2 | | | (United States) Juli Inkster | 500,000 |
| 2 | Apr 15, 2007 | Ginn Open | 67-72-67-72=278 | −10 | 1 stroke | (Mexico) Lorena Ochoa | 390,000 |
| 3 | Apr 5, 2009 | Kraft Nabisco Championship | 66-74-70-69=279 | −9 | 1 stroke | (United States) Cristie Kerr (United States) Kristy McPherson | 300,000 |
| 4 | Jun 5, 2011 | ShopRite LPGA Classic | 72-64-66=202 | −11 | 1 stroke | (United States) Cristie Kerr (South Korea) Jiyai Shin | 225,000 |
| 5 | Aug 28, 2011 | CN Canadian Women's Open | 68-68-69-70=275 | −13 | 1 stroke | (United States) Stacy Lewis (United States) Michelle Wie | 337,500 |
| 6 | Apr 5, 2015 | ANA Inspiration (2) | 72-68-70-69=279 | −9 | Playoff | (United States) Stacy Lewis | 375,000 |
| 7 | Jan 29, 2017 | Pure Silk-Bahamas LPGA Classic | 64-65-69-68=266 | −26 | Playoff | (United States) Lexi Thompson | 210,000 |
| 8 | Jan 28, 2018 | Pure Silk-Bahamas LPGA Classic (2) | 74-67-66=207 | −12 | 2 strokes | (Taiwan) Hsu Wei-ling | 210,000 |

LPGA Tour playoff record (2–5)

| No. | Year | Tournament | Opponent(s) | Result |
|---|---|---|---|---|
| 1 | 2010 | Bell Micro LPGA Classic | (South Korea) Se Ri Pak (Norway) Suzann Pettersen | Pak won with birdie on third extra hole Pettersen eliminated on second hole with par |
| 2 | 2012 | Women's Australian Open | (Paraguay) Julieta Granada (United States) Jessica Korda (United States) Stacy Lewis (South Korea) So Yeon Ryu (South Korea) Hee Kyung Seo | Korda won with birdie on second extra hole |
| 3 | 2014 | LPGA Championship | (South Korea) Inbee Park | Lost to par on first extra hole |
| 4 | 2014 | LPGA KEB-HanaBank Championship | (South Korea) Baek Kyu-jung (South Korea) Chun In-gee | Baek won with birdie on first extra hole |
| 5 | 2015 | ANA Inspiration | (United States) Stacy Lewis | Won with par on third extra hole |
| 6 | 2017 | Pure Silk-Bahamas LPGA Classic | (United States) Lexi Thompson | Won with birdie on first extra hole |
| 7 | 2018 | Marathon Classic | (Thailand) Thidapa Suwannapura | Lost to birdie on first extra hole |

== Major championships ==
=== Wins (2) ===
| Year | Championship | 54 holes | Winning score | Margin | Runner(s)-up |
|---|---|---|---|---|---|
| 2009 | Kraft Nabisco Championship | 2 shot deficit | −9 (66-74-70-69=279) | 1 stroke | (United States) Cristie Kerr, (United States) Kristy McPherson |
| 2015 | ANA Inspiration | 4 shot deficit | −9 (72-68-70-69=279) | Playoff^{1} | (United States) Stacy Lewis |

^{1} Defeated Stacy Lewis in a sudden-death playoff: Lincicome (5-5-5) and Lewis (5-5-6).

=== Results timeline ===
Results not in chronological order.

| Tournament | 2004 | 2005 | 2006 | 2007 | 2008 | 2009 | 2010 | 2011 | 2012 |
|---|---|---|---|---|---|---|---|---|---|
| Chevron Championship | | | | T2 | CUT | 1 | T21 | T13 | CUT |
| Women's PGA Championship | | T33 | T49 | T6 | T34 | CUT | T14 | T20 | T25 |
| U.S. Women's Open | T55 | T31 | 7 | T14 | T58 | 5 | T25 | T27 | T18 |
| Women's British Open | | CUT | T56 | T11 | CUT | T28 | T9 | T30 | CUT |

| Tournament | 2013 | 2014 | 2015 | 2016 | 2017 | 2018 | 2019 | 2020 | 2021 | 2022 | 2023 | 2024 | 2025 | 2026 |
|---|---|---|---|---|---|---|---|---|---|---|---|---|---|---|
| Chevron Championship | CUT | T59 | 1 | T36 | CUT | CUT | T52 | T64 | T57 | T53 | T23 | T30 | CUT | CUT |
| U.S. Women's Open | T9 | T15 | CUT | T38 | CUT | T25 | | T46 | | | | | | |
| Women's PGA Championship | T17 | 2 | 4 | T22 | T14 | T40 | | T9 | CUT | CUT | CUT | CUT | | |
| The Evian Championship ^ | T44 | T8 | CUT | T22 | T32 | T49 | | NT | CUT | | | | | |
| Women's British Open | T52 | T38 | T50 | T43 | T39 | CUT | | | T39 | | | | | |

^ The Evian Championship was added as a major in 2013

Win
Top 10
Did not play

CUT = missed the half-way cut
NT = no tournament
T = tied

=== Summary ===
| Tournament | Wins | 2nd | 3rd | Top-5 | Top-10 | Top-25 | Events | Cuts made |
|---|---|---|---|---|---|---|---|---|
| Chevron Championship | 2 | 1 | 0 | 3 | 3 | 6 | 20 | 13 |
| U.S. Women's Open | 0 | 0 | 0 | 1 | 3 | 8 | 16 | 14 |
| Women's PGA Championship | 0 | 1 | 0 | 2 | 4 | 10 | 19 | 14 |
| The Evian Championship | 0 | 0 | 0 | 0 | 1 | 2 | 7 | 5 |
| Women's British Open | 0 | 0 | 0 | 0 | 1 | 2 | 15 | 11 |
| Totals | 2 | 2 | 0 | 6 | 12 | 28 | 77 | 57 |

- Most consecutive cuts made – 10 (2009 U.S. Open – 2011 British Open)
- Longest streak of top-10s – 4 (2014 WPC – 2015 WPC)

== LPGA Tour career summary ==
| Year | Tournaments played | Cuts made* | Wins | 2nd | 3rd | Top 10s | Best finish | Earnings ($) | Money list rank | Scoring average | Scoring rank |
|---|---|---|---|---|---|---|---|---|---|---|---|
| 2004 | 2 | 2 | 0 | 0 | 0 | 0 | T55 | n/a | n/a | 73.00 | n/a |
| 2005 | 20 | 12 | 0 | 0 | 0 | 0 | T18 | 127,452 | 72 | 73.18 | 73 |
| 2006 | 23 | 20 | 1 | 0 | 1 | 5 | 1 | 853,013 | 14 | 72.08 | 40 |
| 2007 | 22 | 20 | 1 | 1 | 0 | 4 | 1 | 871,384 | 13 | 72.14 | 24 |
| 2008 | 22 | 11 | 0 | 0 | 0 | 1 | T7 | 114,963 | 92 | 73.72 | 129 |
| 2009 | 22 | 15 | 1 | 0 | 0 | 4 | 1 | 647,147 | 21 | 72.31 | 51 |
| 2010 | 23 | 22 | 0 | 1 | 0 | 6 | T2 | 663,808 | 15 | 71.25 | 15 |
| 2011 | 21 | 21 | 2 | 1 | 2 | 6 | 1 | 1,154,234 | 6 | 71.03 | 9 |
| 2012 | 24 | 20 | 0 | 2 | 1 | 6 | T2 | 581,631 | 23 | 71.53 | 22 |
| 2013 | 23 | 16 | 0 | 0 | 1 | 3 | T3 | 449,113 | 32 | 71.93 | 44 |
| 2014 | 26 | 21 | 0 | 2 | 0 | 6 | 2 | 790,661 | 17 | 71.31 | 23 |
| 2015 | 26 | 23 | 1 | 0 | 0 | 5 | 1 | 933,521 | 12 | 71.41 | 29 |
| 2016 | 25 | 23 | 0 | 0 | 0 | 3 | T8 | 390,128 | 47 | 71.24 | 34 |
| 2017 | 24 | 20 | 1 | 0 | 0 | 3 | 1 | 579,061 | 32 | 70.40 | 22 |
| 2018 | 21 | 19 | 1 | 1 | 1 | 7 | 1 | 833,586 | 22 | 70.39 | 17 |
| 2019 | 7 | 5 | 0 | 0 | 0 | 0 | T22 | 59,023 | 131 | 71.75 | n/a |
| 2020 | 13 | 12 | 0 | 0 | 0 | 1 | T9 | 206,124 | 59 | 71.53 | 39 |
| 2021 | 19 | 14 | 0 | 0 | 0 | 4 | T7 | 214,738 | 80 | 70.82 | 42 |
| 2022 | 11 | 6 | 0 | 0 | 0 | 1 | T6 | 106,812 | 115 | 71.94 | 103 |
| 2023 | 13 | 6 | 0 | 0 | 0 | 0 | T44 | 87,392 | 134 | 72.49 | 121 |
| 2024 | 16 | 5 | 0 | 0 | 0 | 1 | T8 | 105,182 | 132 | 73.13 | 152 |
| 2025 | 6 | 2 | 0 | 0 | 0 | 0 | T32 | 33,579 | 156 | 72.56 | n/a |
| Totals^ | 409 | 315 | 8 | 8 | 6 | 66 | 1 | 9,802,592 | 32 | | |

^ Official through 2025 season. * Includes matchplay and other events without a cut.

== Team appearances ==
Amateur

- Junior Solheim Cup (representing the United States): 2002 (winners), 2003

Professional

- Solheim Cup (representing the United States): 2007 (winners), 2009 (winners), 2011, 2013, 2015 (winners), 2017 (winners)
- Lexus Cup (representing International team): 2006, 2007

=== Solheim Cup record ===
| Year | Total matches | Total W–L–H | Singles W–L–H | Foursomes W–L–H | Fourballs W–L–H | Points won | Points % |
|---|---|---|---|---|---|---|---|
| Career | 21 | 7–12–2 | 1–5–0 | 1–3–1 | 5–4–1 | 8 | 38.1 |
| 2007 | 3 | 0–2–1 | 0–1–0 lost to L. Davies 4&3 | 0–0–0 | 0–1–1 lost w/ P. Hurst halved w/ P. Creamer | 0.5 | 16.7 |
| 2009 | 4 | 2–2–0 | 1–0–0 def. S. Gustafson 3&2 | 0–1–0 lost w/ K. McPherson 3&2 | 1–1–0 won w/ B. Lang 5&4 lost w/ K. McPherson 1 up | 2 | 50.0 |
| 2011 | 4 | 2–2–0 | 0–1–0 lost to C. Boeljon 2 dn | 1–0–0 won w/ P. Creamer 1 up | 1–1–0 lost w/ V. Hurst 5&4 won w/ P.Creamer 3&1 | 2 | 50.0 |
| 2013 | 3 | 1–1–1 | 0–1–0 lost to J. Ewart Shadoff 3&2 | 0–0–1 halved w/ L. Salas | 1–0–0 won w/ B. Lang 4&3 | 1.5 | 50.0 |
| 2015 | 4 | 0–4–0 | 0–1–0 lost to K. Icher 3&2 | 0–2–0 lost w/ M. Wie 2&1 lost w/ A. Stanford 1 dn | 0–1–0 lost w/ A. Lee 2 dn | 0 | 0.0 |
| 2017 | 3 | 2–1–0 | 0–1–0 lost to C. Ciganda 4&3 | 0–0–0 | 2–0–0 won w/ B. Lang 3&2 won w/ B. Lang 2 up | 2 | 66.7 |
