= Jennifer Johnson (golfer) =

American professional golfer (born 1991)

Personal information
- Full name: Jennifer Jean Johnson
- Nationality: United States
- Born: August 2, 1991 (age 35) San Diego, California, U.S.
- Height: 5 ft 8 in (1.73 m)

Career
- Sport: Golf
- College: Arizona State University
- Turned professional: 2010
- Former tours: LPGA Tour; Futures Tour
- Professional wins: 1

Number of wins by tour
- LPGA Tour: 1

Best results in LPGA major championships
- Chevron Championship: T13: 2013
- Women's PGA C'ship: T19: 2012
- U.S. Women's Open: T35: 2012
- Women's British Open: CUT: 2011, 2013
- Evian Championship: T9: 2013

Jennifer Jean Johnson (born August 2, 1991) is an American professional golfer.

Johnson was born in San Diego, California. She played one year of college golf at Arizona State University. She was an All-American as a freshman, then turned professional. She played on several winning U.S. amateur teams: Junior Ryder Cup in 2008, Junior Solheim Cup in 2009, and Curtis Cup in 2010. She lost to Jennifer Song in the 2009 U.S. Women's Amateur final.

Johnson turned professional in 2010. She won her first professional tournament at the 2013 Mobile Bay LPGA Classic.

In 2017, she became an assistant coach of the Cal State San Marcos men's golf team.

== Amateur wins ==
- 2008 California Women's Amateur Championship, Rolex Tournament of Champions

== Professional wins ==
=== LPGA Tour wins ===
No.	Date	Tournament	Winning score	To par	Margin of victory	Runners-up
1	May 19, 2013	Mobile Bay LPGA Classic	67-70-65-65=267	–21	1 stroke	(United States) Jessica Korda (Thailand) Pornanong Phatlum

== Results in LPGA majors ==
Results not in chronological order.

Tournament	2009	2010	2011	2012	2013	2014	2015	2016
Kraft Nabisco Championship	CUT	79		T26	T13	CUT	CUT	CUT
Women's PGA Championship			T43	T19	CUT	T58	CUT	CUT
U.S. Women's Open		T41	T45	T35	CUT	T49		
Women's British Open			CUT		CUT			
The Evian Championship ^					T9	CUT		

^ The Evian Championship was added as a major in 2013.

Top 10
Did not play

CUT = missed the half-way cut
"T" = tied

== Team appearances ==
Amateur

- Junior Ryder Cup: 2008 (winners)
- Junior Solheim Cup: 2009 (winners)
- Curtis Cup: 2010 (winners)
