= Ilhee Lee =

South Korean professional golfer (born 1988)

Ilhee Lee 이일희
Personal information
- Nationality: South Korea
- Born: 13 December 1988 (age 37) South Korea
- Height: 5 ft 5 in (1.65 m)

Career
- Sport: Golf
- College: Sungkyunkwan University
- Turned professional: 2006
- Current tour: LPGA Tour (joined 2010)
- Former tour: LPGA of Korea Tour
- Professional wins: 1

Number of wins by tour
- LPGA Tour: 1

Best results in LPGA major championships
- Chevron Championship: T29: 2015
- Women's PGA C'ship: T40: 2014
- U.S. Women's Open: T4: 2012
- Women's British Open: T46: 2025
- Evian Championship: T4: 2015

Ilhee Lee (Korean: 이일희;born 13 December 1988) is a South Korean professional golfer.

== Career ==
In 1988, Lee was born in South Korea. As an amateur, Lee won the 2004 Asia-Pacific Junior Championship.

In June 2006, Lee turned professional. Lee won the 2013 Pure Silk-Bahamas LPGA Classic. She finished two shots in front of Irene Cho.

== Professional wins ==
=== LPGA Tour wins (1) ===
No.	Date	Tournament	Winning score	Margin of victory	Runner-up
1	26 May 2013	Pure Silk-Bahamas LPGA Classic	−11 (41-43-42=126)	2 strokes	(United States) Irene Cho

LPGA Tour playoff record (0–1)

No.	Year	Tournament	Opponents	Result
1	2014	Mizuno Classic	(Japan) Kotono Kozuma (South Korea) Mi Hyang Lee	Lee won with birdie on fifth extra hole

== Results in LPGA majors ==
Results not in chronological order.

Tournament	2010	2011	2012	2013	2014	2015	2016	2017	2018	2019	2020	2021	2022	2023	2024	2025	2026
Chevron Championship				CUT	T46	T29	T71										CUT
U.S. Women's Open			T4	CUT	67	CUT	CUT						CUT			CUT	
Women's PGA Championship	CUT	CUT	T67	T53	T40	CUT	CUT	CUT								78	
The Evian Championship ^				T11	T32	T4	T61									CUT	
Women's British Open			CUT	CUT	66	CUT	CUT									T46	

^ The Evian Championship was added as a major in 2013.

Top 10
Did not play

CUT = missed the halfway cut
T = tied

=== Summary ===
Tournament	Wins	2nd	3rd	Top-5	Top-10	Top-25	Events	Cuts made
Chevron Championship	0	0	0	0	0	0	5	3
U.S. Women's Open	0	0	0	1	1	1	7	2
Women's PGA Championship	0	0	0	0	0	0	9	4
Women's British Open	0	0	0	0	0	0	6	2
The Evian Championship	0	0	0	1	1	2	5	4
Totals	0	0	0	2	2	3	32	15

- Most consecutive cuts made – 7 (2013 Evian – 2015 ANA)
- Longest streak of top-10s – 1 (twice)
