= Catriona Matthew =

Scottish professional golfer (born 1969)

Catriona Matthew OBE
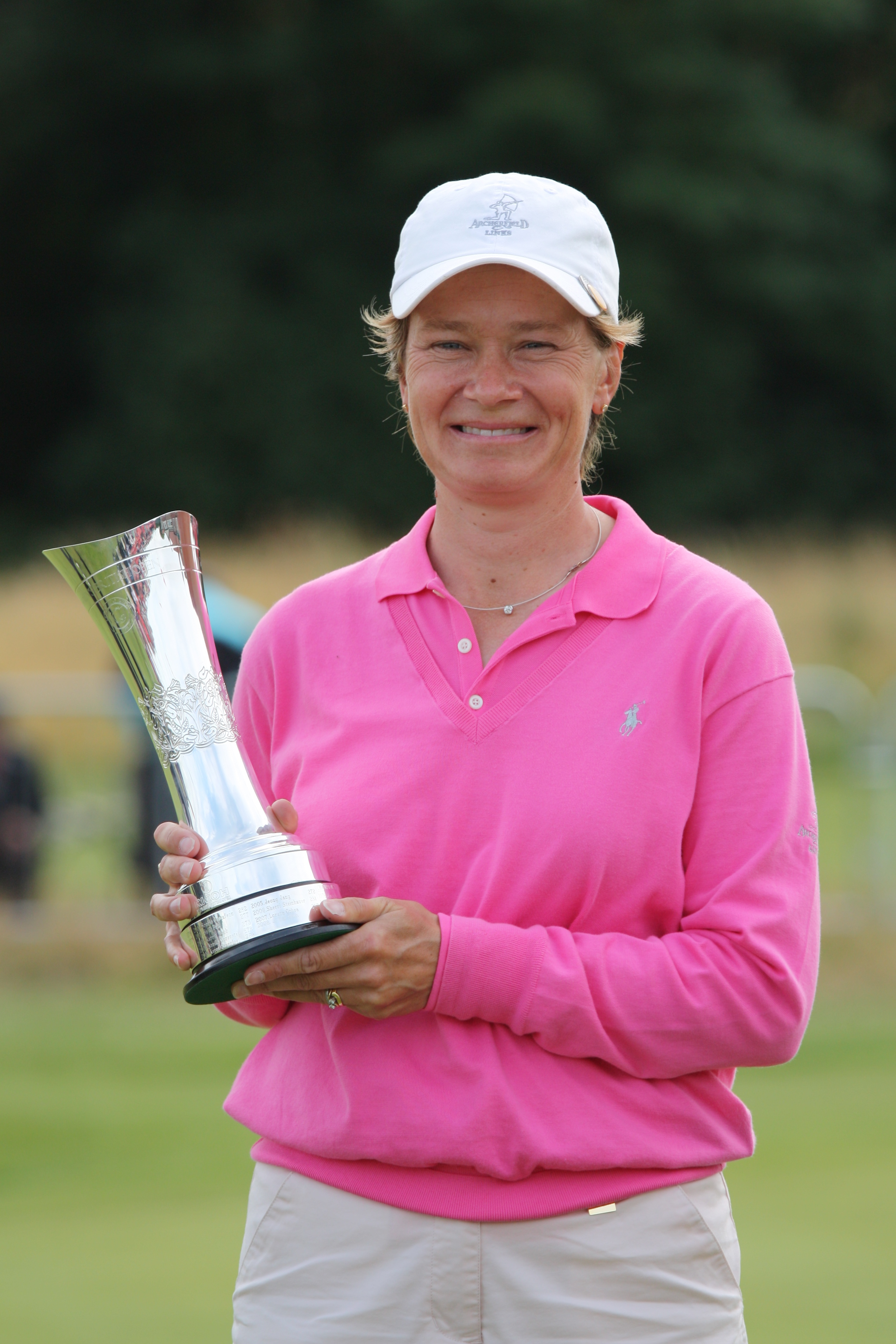
- Victory at the 2009 Women's British Open

Personal information
- Full name: Catriona Isobel Matthew
- Nationality: Scotland
- Born: 25 August 1969 (age 57) Edinburgh, Scotland
- Height: 5 ft 4 in (1.63 m)
- Spouse: Graeme Matthew
- Children: 2

Career
- Sport: Golf
- College: University of Stirling
- Turned professional: 1995
- Former tours: LPGA Tour (joined 1995); LET (joined 1995)
- Professional wins: 11

Number of wins by tour
- LPGA Tour: 4
- Ladies European Tour: 6
- WPGA Tour of Australasia: 1
- Other: 1

Best results in LPGA major championships (wins: 1)
- Chevron Championship: T2: 2007
- Women's PGA C'ship: 2nd: 2013
- U.S. Women's Open: T4: 2001
- du Maurier Classic: 5th: 1999
- Women's British Open: Won: 2009
- Evian Championship: T36: 2016

Achievements and awards
- Ladies European Tour Player of the Year: 2009
- Heather Farr Player Award: 2009
Medal record
Representing Great Britain
World University Championship
Bronze medal – third place	1988 Cagliari	Individual
Silver medal – second place	1988 Cagliari	Team

Catriona Isobel Matthew OBE (née Lambert; born 25 August 1969) is a Scottish professional golfer who played mainly on the US-based LPGA Tour and was also a member of the Ladies European Tour.

== Amateur career ==
Catriona Lambert was born in Edinburgh, and grew up in North Berwick. She learned to play golf on the Children's Course and North Berwick West Links in the town. She had a successful junior and amateur career, becoming Scottish Girls champion in 1986 and Scottish Under-21 Stroke Play champion in 1988 and 1989. She captured the Scottish Amateur title in 1991, 1993 and 1994, and the British Amateur title in 1993. She is also a two-time winner of the St Rule Trophy played at St Andrews. She was a member of the 1990, 1992 and 1994 Great Britain & Ireland Curtis Cup teams. She graduated from the University of Stirling in 1992 having studied accountancy, this being one of a few British universities offering golf scholarships.

== Professional career ==
Matthew qualified for the LPGA Tour by tying for fifth at the 1994 LPGA Final Qualifying Tournament to earn exempt status for the 1995 season. She soon established herself on the Tour, and her best seasons were 2001 and 2005, when she finished tenth on the money list.

Matthew also qualified for the Ladies European Tour in 1995 and plays several events on that tour each season. She won her maiden professional tournament at the Holden Women's Australian Open in 1996. She won the 1998 McDonald's WPGA Championship on the Ladies European Tour. She was a member of the 1998 Solheim Cup Team and first reserve for the 2000 matches held in her native Scotland. When Helen Alfredsson hurt her wrist she was called into the team but Alfredsson recovered and Matthew did not play. She was somewhat controversially left out of the 2002 Solheim Cup team but was a captain's pick for the 2003 team, gaining the Cup winning point. She was a captain's pick for the 2005 team as well. She qualified outright for the 2007, 2009 and 2011 Solheim Cup teams.

She teamed with Janice Moodie to represent Scotland at the 2005 and 2006 Women's World Cup of Golf. and was a member of the victorious International team captained by Annika Sörenstam in the inaugural Lexus Cup.

She won the 2007 Scandinavian TPC hosted by Annika.

In January 2009, she won the inaugural HSBC LPGA Brasil Cup 2009, an unofficial LPGA event with a field of 14 LPGA players and a Brazilian national amateur. Matthew was five months pregnant with her second child at the time of the victory.

On 2 August 2009 at Royal Lytham & St Annes, Matthew won the Ricoh Women's British Open with a final score of 3-under-par over second-place finisher Karrie Webb. It was her first win in a major tournament. The victory came 11 weeks after she gave birth to her second daughter, Sophie. She was the first player from Scotland to win a women's major golf tournament.

On 13 November 2011, Matthew won her fourth LPGA title at the Lorena Ochoa Invitational in Mexico.

At the 2013 LPGA Championship, Matthew finished runner-up after losing a sudden-death playoff against the world number one Inbee Park. Matthew and Park finished the tournament tied together at five-under-par, with Matthew coming from seven strokes behind Park at the start of the final round. In the playoff, they both parred the first two extra holes, but Matthew lost out on the third extra hole when Park made birdie.

In July 2016, Matthew was named as a vice-captain for the 2017 Solheim Cup but ended up playing in the match after an injury to Suzann Pettersen.

On 21 September 2017, Matthew was announced as captain for the 2019 Solheim Cup, which took place at Gleneagles. Europe won the cup in 2019.

In October 2019, Matthew was announced as Solheim Cup captain for 2021. On 6 September 2021, Matthew led the European team to defeat the US at the Inverness Club, Toledo, Ohio.

== Personal life ==
Matthew's husband, Graeme, is her caddy. On 18 December 2006, they had their first child together, a daughter; on 16 May 2009, Matthew gave birth to a second daughter.

In July 2009, Matthew and her husband escaped a fire at the hotel they were staying in while she played in the Evian Masters. Graeme suffered burns to his feet and was unable to caddy for two rounds.

Matthew was appointed Member of the Order of the British Empire (MBE) in the 2010 New Year Honours and Officer of the Order of the British Empire (OBE) in the 2020 New Year Honours for services to golf.

== Professional wins (11) ==
=== LPGA Tour wins (4) ===
No.	Date	Tournament	Winning score	To par	Margin of victory	Runner(s)-up	Winner's share ($)
1	17 Feb 2001	Cup Noodles Hawaiian Ladies Open	67-71-72=210	−6	3 strokes	(Sweden) Annika Sörenstam	112,500
2	22 Aug 2004	Wendy's Championship for Children	72-67-71-68=278	−10	Playoff	(South Korea) Hee-Won Han	165,000
3	2 Aug 2009	**Women's British Open**^{1}	74-67-71-73=285	−3	3 strokes	(Australia) Karrie Webb	335,000
4	13 Nov 2011	Lorena Ochoa Invitational	69-68-68-71=276	−12	4 strokes	(South Korea) I.K. Kim (Sweden) Anna Nordqvist	200,000

LPGA Tour playoff record (1–2)

No.	Year	Tournament	Opponent(s)	Result
1	2004	Wendy's Championship for Children	(South Korea) Hee-Won Han	Won with par on first extra hole
2	2012	LPGA KEB-HanaBank Championship	(Norway) Suzann Pettersen	Lost to birdie on third extra hole
3	2013	**Wegmans LPGA Championship**	(South Korea) Inbee Park	Lost to birdie on third extra hole

=== Ladies European Tour wins (6) ===
No.	Date	Tournament	Winning score	To par	Margin of victory	Runner(s)-up	Winner's share (€)
1	9 Aug 1998	McDonald's WPGA Championship	71-69-67-69=276	−12	5 strokes	(Sweden) Helen Alfredsson (England) Laura Davies	45,000
2	12 Aug 2007	Scandinavian TPC hosted by Annika	71-74-66-68=279	−10	3 strokes	(Sweden) Sophie Gustafson (United States) Laura Diaz	78,750
3	2 Aug 2009	**Women's British Open**^{1}	74-67-71-73=285	−3	3 strokes	(Australia) Karrie Webb	235,036
4	20 Aug 2011	Aberdeen Ladies Scottish Open	70-65-66=201	−15	10 strokes	(United States) Hannah Jun	33,000
5	5 Aug 2012	Ladies Irish Open	67-71-71=209	−7	1 stroke	(Norway) Suzann Pettersen	52,500
6	1 Sep 2013	Aberdeen Asset Management Ladies Scottish Open	71-67-70=208	−8	2 strokes	(England) Hannah Burke	31,537

=== Other wins (2) ===
No.	Date	Tournament	Winning score	To par	Margin of victory	Runner-up
1	9 Nov 1996	Holden Women's Australian Open (ALPG Tour)	72-74-68-69=283	−12	3 strokes	(Australia) Karrie Webb
2	25 Jan 2009	HSBC LPGA Brasil Cup (unofficial LPGA event)	69-69=138	−6	5 strokes	(United States) Kristy McPherson

^{1} The Ricoh Women's British Open was co-sanctioned by the LPGA Tour and the Ladies European Tour.
Majors championships are shown in bold.

== Major championships ==
=== Wins (1) ===
Year	Championship	Winning score	Margin	Runner-up
2009	Women's British Open	−3 (74-67-71-73=285)	3 strokes	(Australia) Karrie Webb

=== Results timeline ===
Results not in chronological order.

Tournament	1995	1996	1997	1998	1999	2000
Chevron Championship				T13	T7	T27
U.S. Women's Open		T52	27	CUT	T8	T44
Women's PGA Championship	CUT		T25	T37	CUT	CUT
du Maurier Classic	CUT	T12	T41	T14	5	T46

Tournament	2001	2002	2003	2004	2005	2006	2007	2008	2009
Chevron Championship	CUT	T51	5	5	44	CUT	T2	CUT	
U.S. Women's Open	T4	T22	T22	19	T31	19	T16	T17	
Women's PGA Championship	T30	8	T37	T61	T49	CUT	T10	CUT	
Women's British Open ^	T3	T35	CUT	T29	21	CUT	T7	T38	1

Tournament	2010	2011	2012	2013	2014	2015	2016	2017	2018	2019
Chevron Championship	T15	CUT	T15	T7	T11	T11	T32	CUT	T55	
U.S. Women's Open	CUT	T21	CUT	T15	T10	CUT	T26	T44	CUT	
Women's PGA Championship	T34	T34	T36	2	T30	T22	T12	CUT	CUT	CUT
The Evian Championship ^^				T64	CUT	T53	T36	CUT	CUT	
Women's British Open	CUT	T5	T10	T11	CUT	T50	T5	CUT	T42	CUT

Tournament	2020	2021	2022	2023	2024
Chevron Championship					
U.S. Women's Open					
Women's PGA Championship					
The Evian Championship ^^	NT				
Women's British Open	T59	CUT	CUT	CUT	CUT

^ The Women's British Open replaced the du Maurier Classic as an LPGA major in 2001.
^^ The Evian Championship was added as a major in 2013

Win
Top 10
Did not play

CUT = missed the half-way cut
NT = no tournament
T = tied

=== Summary ===
Tournament	Wins	2nd	3rd	Top-5	Top-10	Top-25	Events	Cuts made
Chevron Championship	0	1	0	3	5	10	20	15
U.S. Women's Open	0	0	0	1	3	11	22	17
Women's PGA Championship	0	1	0	1	3	6	23	15
The Evian Championship	0	0	0	0	0	0	6	3
Women's British Open	1	0	1	4	6	8	24	14
du Maurier Classic	0	0	0	1	1	3	6	5
Totals	1	2	1	10	18	38	101	69

- Most consecutive cuts made – 10 (2001 LPGA – 2003 U.S. Open)
- Longest streak of top-10s – 2 (four times)

== LPGA Tour career summary ==
Year	Tournaments played	Cuts Made	Wins	2nd	3rd	Top 10s	Best Finish	Earnings ($)	Money list rank	Scoring average	Scoring rank
1995	22	13	0	0	0	0	T12	37,832	101	73.59	90
1996	27	17	0	0	0	1	T5	76,490	79	73.12	66
1997	30	21	0	1	1	4	T2	221,276	33	72.15	31
1998	26	18	0	0	0	0	T13	118,157	63	72.33	54
1999	30	23	0	1	1	7	2	370,162	21	71.53	21
2000	28	23	0	0	0	7	5	278,382	32	72.10	24
2001	29	26	1	1	2	10	1	747,970	10	71.41	18
2002	28	26	0	2	0	8	T2	567,394	15	71.22	13
2003	27	26	0	0	1	7	3	506,273	21	71.22	20
2004	28	27	1	0	0	6	1	650,444	14	71.16	17
2005	26	25	0	0	6	12	3	776,924	10	71.46	12
2006	18	13	0	0	0	1	T4	191,153	65	72.90	83
2007	18	17	0	1	0	6	T2	518,366	28	72.16	25
2008	22	18	0	1	0	3	T2	433,726	41	71.92	35
2009	10	9	1	0	0	3	1	480,678	26	71.44	21
2010	18	14	0	0	0	2	T6	264,717	40	72.16	37
2011	19	18	1	0	0	6	1	692,340	16	72.04	11
2012	20	18	0	1	0	7	2	714,272	18	71.09	13
2013	21	18	0	1	1	5	2	643,896	21	71.50	28
2014	24	20	0	0	2	4	3	541,951	32	71.48	33
2015	22	17	0	0	0	2	T8	288,285	63	71.64	40
2016	23	22	0	0	0	2	T5	414,669	44	71.37	39
2017	18	11	0	0	0	0	T17	93,245	103	72.38	119
2018	17	8	0	0	0	1	T10	83,617	108	72.10	88
2019	11	3	0	0	0	0	T40	11,303	164	74.15	156
2020	2	1	0	0	0	0	T59	9,384	153	74.17	n/a

- official through 2020 season

Career earnings $9,733,132

== World ranking ==
Position in Women's World Golf Rankings at the end of each calendar year.

Year	World ranking	Source
2006	45	
2007	26	
2008	38	
2009	16	
2010	31	
2011	21	
2012	14	
2013	11	
2014	28	
2015	67	
2016	62	
2017	143	
2018	185	
2019	325	
2020	393	

== Team appearances ==
Amateur

- European Lady Junior's Team Championship (representing Scotland): 1988
- European Ladies' Team Championship (representing Scotland): 1989, 1991, 1993
- Vagliano Trophy (representing Great Britain & Ireland): 1989 (winners), 1991 (winners), 1993 (winners)
- Curtis Cup (representing Great Britain & Ireland): 1990, 1992 (winners), 1994 (tie, Cup retained), 2024 (non-playing captain, winners)
- Espirito Santo Trophy (representing Great Britain & Ireland): 1992
- Commonwealth Trophy (representing Great Britain): 1991 (winners)

Professional

- Solheim Cup (representing Europe): 1998, 2003 (winners), 2005, 2007, 2009, 2011 (winners), 2013 (winners), 2015, 2017, 2019 (non-playing captain, winners), 2021 (non-playing captain, winners)
- Lexus Cup (representing International team): 2005 (winners), 2007
- World Cup (representing Scotland): 2005, 2006, 2008
- Handa Cup (representing World team): 2015
- The Queens (representing Europe): 2015, 2016
- European Championships (representing Great Britain): 2018

=== Solheim Cup record ===
Year	Total matches	Total W–L–H	Singles W–L–H	Foursomes W–L–H	Fourballs W–L–H	Points won	Points %
Career	37	18–11–8	6–2–1	8–5–4	4–4–3	22	59.5
1998	3	1–2–0	0–1–0 lost to S. Steinhauer 3&2	1–1–0 won w/ A. Sörenstam 3&2 lost w/ A. Sörenstam 3&2	0–0–0	1	33.3
2003	5	3–1–1	1–0–0 def. R. Jones 3&1	1–0–1 won w/ J. Moodie 5&3 halved w/ J. Moodie	1–1–0 lost w/ L. Davies 2&1 won w/ J. Moodie 4&3	3.5	70.0
2005	5	2–2–1	1–0–0 def. W. Ward 3&2	0–1–1 halved w/ C. Koch lost w/ A. Sörenstam 1 dn	1–1–0 won w/ A. Sörenstam 2&1 lost w/ C. Koch 1 dn	2.5	50.0
2007	4	3–1–0	1–0–0 def. L. Diaz 3&2	1–1–0 lost w/ A. Sörenstam 4&2 won w/ A. Sörenstam 1 up	1–0–0 won w/ I. Tinning 4&2	3	75.0
2009	4	1–1–2	1–0–0 def. K. McPherson 3&2	0–1–0 lost w/ J. Moodie 2&1	0–0–2 halved w/ M. Hjorth halved w/ D. Luna	2	50.0
2011	4	2–0–2	1–0–0 def. P. Creamer 6&5	1–0–1 won w/ A. Muñoz 3&2 halved w/ A. Muñoz	0–0–1 halved w/ S. Gal	3	75.0
2013	4	0–2–2	0–0–1 halved with G. Piller	0–1–1 lost w/ J. Ewart Shadoff 3&2 halved w/ C. Hull	0–1–0 lost w/ C. Masson 2&1	1	25.0
2015	4	3–1–0	0–1–0 lost to M. Pressel 2 dn	2–0–0 won w/ S. Gal 3&2 won w/ S. Gal 1 up	1–0–0 won w/ K. Icher 2&1	3	75.0
2017	4	3–1–0	1–0–0 def. S. Lewis 1 up	2–0–0 won w/ K. Icher 1 up won w/ K. Icher 2&1	0–1–0 lost w/ G. Hall 4&2	3	75.0
