= 2008 U.S. Women's Open =

Golf tournament

Coordinates: 44.915°N 93.380°W

Tournament information
- Dates: June 26–29, 2008
- Location: Edina, Minnesota
- Course: Interlachen Country Club
- Organized by: USGA
- Tour: LPGA Tour

Statistics
- Par: 73
- Length: 6,789 yards (6,208 m)
- Field: 156 players, 74 after cut
- Cut: 150 (+4)
- Prize fund: $3.25 million
- Winner's share: $585,000

Champion
- (South Korea) Inbee Park
- 283 (−9)

Location in the United States
Location in Minnesota

The 2008 U.S. Women's Open was the 63rd U.S. Women's Open, held June 26–29 at Interlachen Country Club in Edina, Minnesota, a suburb southwest of Minneapolis. It was the first U.S. Women's Open played at the course, which hosted the Solheim Cup in 2002. The winner was 19-year-old Inbee Park, four strokes ahead of runner-up Helen Alfredsson. The tournament was televised by ESPN and NBC Sports.

The course hosted the U.S. Open in 1930, part of the grand slam of Bobby Jones.

== Field ==
=== Exempt players ===
1. Last 10 U.S. Women's Open Champions
Juli Inkster, Birdie Kim, Cristie Kerr, Hilary Lunke, Meg Mallon, Se Ri Pak, Annika Sörenstam, Karrie Webb

2. Top two finishers in the 2007 U.S. Women's Amateur and winner of the 2006 U.S. Women's Amateur
Amanda Blumenherst (a), Kimberly Kim (a), Mariajo Uribe (a)

3. Last five LPGA Champions
Suzann Pettersen, Yani Tseng

4. Last five Women's British Open Champions
Jeong Jang, Lorena Ochoa, Sherri Steinhauer, Karen Stupples

5. Last five Kraft Nabisco Champions
Grace Park, Morgan Pressel

6. From the 2007 U.S. Women's Open, the 20 lowest scorers and ties.
Kyeong Bae, Paula Creamer, Julieta Granada, Amy Hung, Jimin Kang, Christina Kim, Mi Hyun Kim, Jee Young Lee, Brittany Lincicome, Catriona Matthew, Ai Miyazato, Angela Park, Inbee Park, Jiyai Shin, Angela Stanford

7. From the 2007 LPGA Tour money list, the top 40 money leaders
Shi Hyun Ahn, Nicole Castrale, Laura Davies, Laura Diaz, Meaghan Francella, Natalie Gulbis, Sophie Gustafson, Rachel Hetherington, Maria Hjorth, Pat Hurst, I.K. Kim, Young Kim, Brittany Lang, Sarah Lee, Seon Hwa Lee, Na On Min, Stacy Prammanasudh, Reilley Rankin, Lindsey Wright

8. From the 2008 LPGA Tour money, the top 35 money leaders through June 1
Minea Blomqvist, Na Yeon Choi, Allison Fouch, Hee-Won Han, Song-Hee Kim, Candie Kung, Leta Lindley, Teresa Lu, Jane Park, Momoko Ueda, Sun Young Yoo

9. Winner of tournaments from the conclusion of last year's U.S. Women's Open until now
Louise Friberg

10. Top 3 players from the Japan LPGA Tour, LPGA of Korea Tour, and Ladies European Tour
Sun-Ju Ahn, Bettina Hauert, Jeon Mi-jeong, Eun-Hee Ji, Gwladys Nocera, Sakura Yokomine

=== Qualifiers ===
- Helen Alfredsson
- Sarah Almond (a)
- Chieko Amanuma
- Rachel Bailey
- Vanessa Brockett
- Laurie Brower
- Silvia Cavalleri
- Jeanne Cho-Hunicke
- Il Mi Chung
- Cydney Clanton (a)
- Eva Dahllof
- Diana D'Alessio
- Heather Daly-Donofrio
- Wendy Doolan
- Lauren Doughtie (a)
- Moira Dunn
- Kathleen Ekey (a)
- Courtney Ellenbogen (a)
- Shanshan Feng
- Jamie Fischer
- Danah Ford
- Tara Goedeken (a)
- Anna Grzebien
- Nicole Hage
- Kim Hall
- Sin Ham
- Candy Hannemann
- Mina Harigae
- Marcy Hart
- Janell Howland
- Katherine Hull
- Jang Ha-na (a)
- Na Ri Kim
- Carin Koch
- Jessica Korda (a)
- Kelli Kuehne
- Katrina Leckovic
- Erynne Lee (a)
- Jennie Lee (a)
- Joanne Lee (a)
- Meena Lee
- Stacy Lewis
- Tiffany Lua (a)
- Charlotte Mayorkas
- Jill McGill
- Patricia Meunier-Lebouc
- Sydnee Michaels (a)
- Janice Moodie
- Paola Moreno (a)
- Miriam Nagl
- Martha Nause
- Liselotte Neumann
- Virada Nirapathpongporn
- Angela Oh (a)
- Ji Young Oh
- Sunny Oh
- Cyd Okino (a)
- Kristen Park (a)
- Emily Powers (a)
- Michele Redman
- Jean Reynolds
- Jennifer Rosales
- Kristen Samp
- Giulia Sergas
- Alena Sharp
- Jenny Shin (a)
- Ashleigh Simon
- Karin Sjödin
- Jennifer Song (a)
- Bomi Suh
- Victoria Tanco (a)
- Alexis Thompson (a)
- Sherri Turner
- Gina Umeck
- Lynn Valentine
- Whitney Wade
- Alison Walshe (a)
- Linda Wessberg
- Michelle Wie
- Leah Wigger
- Carri Wood
- Amy Yang
- Aiko Yoshida
- Heather Young

(a) - amateur

== Course layout ==
Hole	1	2	3	4	5	6	7	8	9	Out	10	11	12	13	14	15	16	17	18	In	Total
Yardage	344	473	557	178	438	412	316	227	413	3,358	528	353	164	525	185	345	360	441	530	3,431	6,789
Par	4	5	5	3	4	4	4	3	4	36	5	4	3	5	3	4	4	4	5	37	73

== Round summaries ==
=== First round ===
Thursday, June 26, 2008

The Open kicked off on Thursday with the field playing in threesomes starting from either the first tee or the tenth tee. Featured threesomes included Annika Sörenstam, Suzann Pettersen, and Paula Creamer, ranked 2, 3, and 4 respectively in the world rankings. Sorenstam and Petterssen opened their U.S. Opens with scores of 75 (+2) and 77 (+4) respectively. Creamer shot a 70 to move three shots off the pace. The other featured threesome included number one ranked player Lorena Ochoa, defending U.S. Open champion Cristie Kerr, and 2007 U.S. Women's Amateur champion Maria José Uribe. Uribe led that group with a 69 to lead all amateurs and end the day in a tie for fourth overall; Kerr shot a 1-under 72; Ochoa had an up-and-down round of even-par 73. The rounds of the day belonged to Ji Young Oh, who had eight birdies and two bogeys and to Pat Hurst who had six birdies and an eagle. Oh and Hurst tied after Round 1 at six-under par 67.

Place	Player	Score	To par
T1	(United States) Pat Hurst	67	−6
T1	(South Korea) Ji Young Oh	67	−6
3	(South Korea) Song-Hee Kim	68	−5
T4	(Sweden) Louise Friberg	69	−4
T4	(South Korea) Jiyai Shin	69	−4
T4	(Colombia) Mariajo Uribe (a)	69	−4
T7	(Sweden) Helen Alfredsson	70	−3
T7	(United States) Paula Creamer	70	−3
T7	(England) Laura Davies	70	−3
T7	(Scotland) Catriona Matthew	70	−3
T7	(United States) Linda Wessberg	70	−3

=== Second round ===
Friday, June 27, 2008
Saturday, June 28, 2008

With Thursday's rounds completed many well-known American players took a step down on the competition while many lesser-known and international players took a step up. A two-hour weather delay required some to finish their rounds on Saturday morning. Angela Park had an even round on Thursday, and a 6-under 67 in the second round. She held a one-stroke lead over three others: Inbee Park of Korea, Helen Alfredsson of Sweden, and the only Finnish player in the tournament, Minea Blomqvist. The two leading Americans were Paula Creamer and Cristie Kerr at 4-under 142. Both first-round leaders took a severe fall on Friday, with Ji Young Oh, who had to finish her second round on Saturday due to the weather delay, shooting a 76 and Pat Hurst turning in a 5-over 78. Many top-ranked or well-known players missed the cut, including Laura Davies (70-81), Natalie Gulbis (73-80), 13-year-old Alexis Thompson (75-77), 2003 champion and Minnesotan Hilary Lunke (74-78), Juli Inkster (74-81), and Michelle Wie (81-75).

Place	Player	Score	To par
1	(Brazil) Angela Park; United States	73-67=140	−6
T2	(Sweden) Helen Alfredsson	70-71=141	−5
T2	(Finland) Minea Blomqvist	72-69=141	−5
T2	(South Korea) Inbee Park	72-69=141	−5
T5	(South Korea) Jeong Jang	73-69=142	−4
T5	(United States) Cristie Kerr	72-70=142	−4
T5	(United States) Candie Kung	72-70=142	−4
T5	(United States) Paula Creamer	70-72=142	−4
T9	(United States) Stacy Lewis	73-70=143	−3
T9	(Japan) Momoko Ueda	72-71=143	−3
T9	(Taiwan) Teresa Lu	71-72=143	−3
T9	(Japan) Ai Miyazato	71-72=143	−3
T9	(Sweden) Louise Friberg	69-74=143	−3
T9	(South Korea) Jiyai Shin	69-74=143	−3
T9	(Colombia) Mariajo Uribe (a)	69-74=143	−3
T9	(South Korea) Ji Young Oh	67-72=143	−3

=== Third round ===
Saturday, June 28, 2008

Place	Player	Score	To par
1	(United States) Stacy Lewis	73-70-67=210	−9
2	(United States) Paula Creamer	70-72-69=211	−8
T3	(Sweden) Helen Alfredsson	70-71-71=212	−7
T3	(South Korea) Inbee Park	72-69-71=212	−7
5	(South Korea) I.K. Kim	71-73-69=213	−6
6	(South Korea) Mi Hyun Kim	72-72-70=214	−5
T7	(Colombia) Mariajo Uribe (a)	69-74-72=215	−4
T7	(Brazil) Angela Park; United States	73-67-75=215	−4
T9	(South Korea) Young Kim	74-71-71=216	−3
T9	(Japan) Momoko Ueda	72-71-73=216	−3
T9	(Taiwan) Teresa Lu	71-72-73=216	−3
T9	(South Korea) Jeong Jang	73-69-74=216	−3

=== Final round ===
Sunday, June 29, 2008

Place	Player	Score	To par	Money ($)
1	(South Korea) Inbee Park	72-69-71-71=283	−9	585,000
2	(Sweden) Helen Alfredsson	70-71-71-75=287	−5	350,000
T3	(Brazil) Angela Park	73-67-75-73=288	−4	162,487
T3	(South Korea) In-Kyung Kim	71-73-69-75=288	−4	162,487
T3	(United States) Stacy Lewis	73-70-67-78=288	−4	162,487
T6	(Italy) Giulia Sergas	73-74-72-70=289	−3	94,117
T6	(United States) Nicole Castrale	74-70-74-71=289	−3	94,117
T6	(South Korea) Mi Hyun Kim	72-72-70-75=289	−3	94,117
T6	(United States) Paula Creamer	70-72-69-78=289	−3	94,117
T10	(Taiwan) Teresa Lu	71-72-73-74=290	−2	75,734
T10	(Colombia) Mariajo Uribe (a)	69-74-72-75=290	−2	0

==== Scorecard ====
Final round

Hole	1	2	3	4	5	6	7	8	9	10	11	12	13	14	15	16	17	18
Par	4	5	5	3	4	4	4	3	4	5	4	3	5	3	4	4	4	5
(South Korea) Park	−8	−9	−9	−9	−9	−8	−8	−7	−7	−7	−8	−8	−9	−9	−9	−9	−8	−9
(Sweden) Alfredsson	−7	−8	−7	−6	−5	−5	−5	−4	−4	−4	−4	−3	−5	−5	−5	−4	−4	−5
(South Korea) I.K. Kim	−6	−7	−6	−6	−5	−4	−4	−3	−3	−3	−4	−3	−4	−5	−4	−5	−3	−4
(United States) Lewis	−9	−7	−7	−7	−7	−7	−7	−6	−5	−5	−5	−4	−5	−5	−4	−4	−4	−4
(United States) Creamer	−8	−6	−6	−7	−7	−6	−6	−5	−3	−3	−3	−2	−2	−2	−2	−3	−3	−3
(South Korea) M.H. Kim	−4	−4	−4	−5	−5	−4	−4	−2	−3	−3	−4	−5	−4	−4	−4	−4	−3	−3

Cumulative tournament scores, relative to par
