= 2007 U.S. Women's Open =

Coordinates: 35.197°N 79.392°W

Tournament information
- Dates: June 28 – July 1, 2007
- Location: Southern Pines, North Carolina
- Course: Pine Needles Lodge and Golf Club
- Organized by: USGA
- Tour: LPGA Tour

Statistics
- Par: 71
- Length: 6,664 yards (6,094 m)
- Field: 156 players, 67 after cut
- Cut: 148 (+6)
- Prize fund: $3.1 million
- Winner's share: $560,000

Champion
- (United States) Cristie Kerr
- 279 (−5)

Location in the United States
Location in North Carolina

The 2007 U.S. Women's Open was the 62nd U.S. Women's Open, held June 28 to July 1 at the Pine Needles Lodge and Golf Club in Southern Pines, North Carolina. Cristie Kerr won the first of her two major titles, two strokes ahead of runners-up Lorena Ochoa and Angela Park. The event was televised by ESPN and NBC Sports.

Due to weather delays, the third round began on Saturday afternoon and was completed on Sunday morning. Kerr shot 66 (−5) to gain the 54-hole lead at 209 (−4), one stroke ahead of top-ranked Ochoa, Morgan Pressel, and Jiyai Shin.

Pine Needles previously hosted the championship in 1996 and 2001; it joined Atlantic City Country Club (1948, 1965, 1975) as the only courses to host three U.S. Women's Opens.

== Course layout ==
Hole	1	2	3	4	5	6	7	8	9	Out	10	11	12	13	14	15	16	17	18	In	Total
Yards	488	450	132	360	205	411	405	356	380	3,187	518	376	400	205	426	523	176	440	413	3,477	6,664
Par	5	4	3	4	3	4	4	4	4	35	5	4	4	3	4	5	3	4	4	36	71

Lengths of the course for previous U.S. Women's Opens:

- 2001: 6,256 yards (5,720 m), par 70
- 1996: 6,207 yards (5,676 m), par 70

== Round summaries ==
=== First round ===
Thursday, June 28, 2007
Friday, June 29, 2007

Place	Player	Score	To par
1	(Brazil) Angela Park	68	−3
T2	(Japan) Shiho Oyama	69	−2
T2	(South Korea) Inbee Park	69	−2
T4	(South Korea) Ahn Shi-hyun	70	−1
T4	(Paraguay) Julieta Granada	70	−1
T4	(Taiwan) Amy Hung	70	−1
T4	(South Korea) Kim Joo-mi	70	−1
T4	(United States) Charlotte Mayorkas	70	−1
T4	(South Korea) Jiyai Shin	70	−1
T4	(Sweden) Annika Sörenstam	70	−1

=== Second round ===
Friday, June 29, 2007
Saturday, June 30, 2007

Place	Player	Score	To par
1	(Brazil) Angela Park	68-69=137	−5
T2	(Paraguay) Julieta Granada	70-69=139	−3
T2	(Taiwan) Amy Hung	70-69=139	−3
T2	(South Korea) Jiyai Shin	70-69=139	−3
5	(United States) Morgan Pressel	71-70=141	−1
T6	(South Korea) Ahn Shi-hyun	70-72=142	E
T6	(Scotland) Catriona Matthew	75-67=142	E
T6	(Mexico) Lorena Ochoa	71-71=142	E
T6	(Japan) Shiho Oyama	69-73=142	E
T6	(South Korea) Inbee Park	69-73=142	E

=== Third round ===
Saturday, June 30, 2007
Sunday, July 1, 2007

Place	Player	Score	To par
1	(United States) Cristie Kerr	71-72-66=209	−4
T2	(United States) Morgan Pressel	71-70-69=210	−3
T2	(Mexico) Lorena Ochoa	71-71-68=210	−3
T2	(South Korea) Jiyai Shin	70-69-71=210	−3
5	(Brazil) Angela Park	68-69-74=211	−2
T6	(South Korea) Jeong Jang	72-71-70=213	E
T6	(South Korea) Kim Joo-mi	70-73-70=213	E
T6	(South Korea) Inbee Park	69-73-71=213	E
T9	(South Korea) Birdie Kim	73-70-71=214	+1
T9	(South Korea) Jee Young Lee	72-71-71=214	+1
T9	(South Korea) Se Ri Pak	74-72-68=214	+1

=== Final round ===
Sunday, July 1, 2007

Place	Player	Score	To par	Money ($)
1	(United States) Cristie Kerr	71-72-66-70=279	−5	560,000
T2	(Brazil) Angela Park	68-69-74-70=281	−3	271,022
T2	(Mexico) Lorena Ochoa	71-71-68-71=281	−3	271,022
T4	(South Korea) Se Ri Pak	74-72-68-68=282	−2	130,549
T4	(South Korea) Inbee Park	69-73-71-69=282	−2	130,549
6	(South Korea) Jiyai Shin	70-69-71-74=284	E	103,581
7	(South Korea) Jee Young Lee	72-71-71-71=285	+1	93,031
T8	(South Korea) Mi Hyun Kim	71-75-70-70=286	+2	82,464
T8	(South Korea) Jeong Jang	72-71-70-73=286	+2	82,464
T10	(Japan) Ai Miyazato	73-73-72-69=287	+3	66,177
T10	(South Korea) Kyeong Bae	74-71-72-70=287	+3	66,177
T10	(Paraguay) Julieta Granada	70-69-75-73=287	+3	66,177
T10	(United States) Morgan Pressel	71-70-69-77=287	+3	66,177

==== Scorecard ====
Hole	1	2	3	4	5	6	7	8	9	10	11	12	13	14	15	16	17	18
Par	5	4	3	4	3	4	4	4	4	5	4	4	3	4	5	3	4	4
(United States) Kerr	−4	−4	−5	−5	−5	−5	−5	−4	−4	−4	−4	−4	−4	−5	−5	−5	−5	−5
(Brazil) Park	−3	−2	−3	−3	−3	−3	−3	−2	−2	−2	−2	−3	−3	−3	−4	−3	−2	−3
(Mexico) Ochoa	−4	−3	−4	−4	−4	−4	−4	−4	−4	−4	−4	−4	−4	−4	−4	−4	−3	−3
(United States) Pressel	−3	−2	−3	−2	−2	−2	−1	−1	−1	−2	−2	−2	−2	−1	−1	E	+1	+3

Cumulative tournament scores, relative to par
