= Onnarin Sattayabanphot =

Thai professional golfer (born 1984)

Personal information
- Nickname: Moo
- Nationality: Thailand
- Born: 4 February 1984 (age 42) Bangkok, Thailand
- Height: 1.66 m (5 ft 5 1/2 in)

Career
- Sport: Golf
- College: Purdue University
- Turned professional: 2006
- Current tours: LPGA of Japan Tour (joined 2011); Thai LPGA Tour
- Former tours: LPGA Tour; Futures Tour; Ladies Asian Golf Tour
- Professional wins: 8

Number of wins by tour
- LPGA of Japan Tour: 3
- Ladies Asian Golf Tour: 1
- Epson Tour: 1
- Other: 3

Best results in LPGA major championships
- Chevron Championship: DNP
- Women's PGA C'ship: DNP
- U.S. Women's Open: CUT: 2007
- Women's British Open: CUT: 2014
- Evian Championship: DNP
Medal record
Women's golf
Representing Thailand
SEA Games
Gold medal – first place	1999 Bandar Seri Begawan	Team
Gold medal – first place	2001 Kuala Lumpur	Individual
Silver medal – second place	1999 Bandar Seri Begawan	Individual
Silver medal – second place	2001 Kuala Lumpur	Team

Onnarin Sattayabanphot (Thai: อรนรินทร์ สัตยาบรรพต; born 4 February 1984) is a Thai professional golfer who has played on the LPGA of Japan Tour and the Thai LPGA Tour. She has won eight professional tournaments, including three titles on the LPGA of Japan Tour.

As an amateur, Onnarin represented Thailand at the 1999 and 2001 SEA Games, where she won two gold medals and two silver medals. She played college golf in the United States for Purdue University. After turning professional in 2006, she competed on the Futures Tour, where she won the 2007 ILOVENY Championship. She later won the 2009 Thailand Ladies Open on the Ladies Asian Golf Tour. Onnarin joined the LPGA of Japan Tour in 2011 and won three titles on the tour: the 2013 Hoken no Madoguchi Ladies, the 2014 Daikin Orchid Ladies, and the 2017 Golf5 Ladies. She also represented Thailand at the 2014 International Crown.

== Early life and amateur career ==
Onnarin was born on 4 February 1984 in Bangkok, Thailand. She attended La Salle College in Bangkok, where she won 11 junior tournaments over four years, and was a member of the Thai national team from 1999 to 2001. She was named the 1999 Golfer of the Year by the Thailand Amateur Ladies Golf Association.

Onnarin represented Thailand at the SEA Games, winning an individual silver medal and a team gold medal at the 1999 SEA Games in Brunei, and an individual gold medal and a team silver medal at the 2001 SEA Games in Kuala Lumpur.

Onnarin attended Purdue University, where she played college golf for the Purdue Boilermakers women's golf team and earned a degree in organizational leadership and supervision. At Purdue, she recorded 15 top-ten finishes, including one collegiate victory, and was a three-time First-Team All-Big Ten selection from 2004 to 2006. In 2006, she was named an NGCA Second-Team All-American, Purdue Female Athlete of the Year and Big Ten Player of the Year.

== Professional career ==
Onnarin turned professional in 2006. She competed on the Futures Tour in the United States and the Ladies Asian Golf Tour early in her professional career. She joined the Futures Tour in January 2007 and also competed in the 2007 U.S. Women's Open, where she missed the cut.

In September 2007, she won her first professional title at the ILOVENY Championship on the Futures Tour at Capital Hills Golf Course in Albany, New York. She finished at 3-under-par 210 to win by one stroke over Allison Fouch, earning $14,000. The victory moved her from 22nd to 11th on the tour money list with season earnings of $31,951. She was an LPGA Tour rookie in 2008. In 2009, she won the Thailand Ladies Open on the Ladies Asian Golf Tour.

Onnarin joined the LPGA of Japan Tour (JLPGA) in 2011. She won her first JLPGA title at the Hoken no Madoguchi Ladies on 19 May 2013, finishing at 6-under-par and winning by one stroke. In March 2014, she won the Daikin Orchid Ladies in Okinawa, closing with a final-round 67 to finish at 8-under-par and win by two strokes.

Onnarin made another major championship appearance at the 2014 Women's British Open, where she missed the cut. Later that year, she represented Thailand at the inaugural 2014 International Crown in the United States.

On 3 September 2017, she won her third JLPGA Tour title at the Golf5 Ladies tournament in Chiba, shooting a final-round 64 to finish at 12-under-par and win by five strokes.

She has also won twice on the JLPGA Step Up Tour, at the 2010 Sanyoshimbun Ladies Cup and the 2022 Twin Fields Ladies Tournament. In Thailand, she won the 2nd Singha-SAT Thai LPGA Championship on the Thai LPGA Tour in 2015.

== Professional wins (8) ==
=== LPGA of Japan Tour wins (3) ===
No.	Date	Tournament	Winning score	To par	Margin of victory	Runner(s)-up	Ref.
1	19 May 2013	Hoken no Madoguchi Ladies	70-68-72=210	−6	1 stroke	(Japan) Kumiko Kaneda (Japan) Maiko Wakabayashi	
2	9 Mar 2014	Daikin Orchid Ladies	69-72-67=208	−8	2 strokes	(Japan) Mamiko Higa, (Japan) Rikako Morita (Japan) Airi Saitoh, (South Korea) Jiyai Shin (Japan) Ayaka Watanabe	
3	3 Sep 2017	Golf5 Ladies	70-70-64=204	−12	5 strokes	(Japan) Megumi Shimokawa	

=== Futures Tour wins (1) ===
No.	Date	Tournament	Winning score	To par	Margin of victory	Runner-up	Ref.
1	9 September 2007	ILOVENY Championship	71-67-72=210	−3	1 stroke	(United States) Allison Fouch	

=== Ladies Asian Golf Tour wins (1) ===
No.	Date	Tournament	Winning score	To par	Margin of victory	Runner(s)-up	Ref.
1	20 Feb 2009	Thailand Ladies Open	71-70-70=211	−5	Playoff	(South Korea) Kim Hae-jung	

=== JLPGA Step Up Tour wins (2) ===
- 2010 (1) Sanyoshimbun Ladies Cup
- 2022 (1) Twin Fields Ladies Tournament

=== Thai LPGA Tour wins (1) ===
- 2015 (1) 2nd Singha-SAT Thai LPGA Championship

== Results in LPGA majors ==
Tournament	2007	2008	2009	2010	2011	2012	2013	2014
Kraft Nabisco Championship								
LPGA Championship								
U.S. Women's Open	CUT							
Women's British Open								CUT
The Evian Championship^{1}	Not a major							

^{1} The Evian Championship was added as an LPGA major in 2013.

Did not play

CUT = missed the half-way cut

== Team appearances ==
Amateur

- SEA Games (representing Thailand): 2001
- Queen Sirikit Cup (representing Thailand): 2001

Professional

- International Crown (representing Thailand): 2014
