= 2009 U.S. Women's Open =

Coordinates: 40.556°N 75.387°W

Tournament information
- Dates: July 9–12, 2009
- Location: Upper Saucon Township, Pennsylvania, U.S.
- Courses: Saucon Valley Country Club; Old Course
- Organized by: USGA
- Tour: LPGA Tour

Statistics
- Par: 71
- Length: 6,740 yards (6,163 m)
- Field: 156 players, 72 after cut
- Cut: 151 (+9)
- Prize fund: $3.25 million
- Winner's share: $585,000

Champion
- (South Korea) Eun-Hee Ji
- 284 (E)

Location in the United States
Location in Pennsylvania

The 2009 U.S. Women's Open was the 64th U.S. Women's Open. Held July 9–12, it was the first U.S. Women's Open to be played at the Old Course of the Saucon Valley Country Club in Upper Saucon Township, Pennsylvania. Eun-Hee Ji won her only major title, one stroke ahead of runner-up Candie Kung. The event was televised by ESPN and NBC Sports.

Na Yeon Choi shot a 68 (−3) in the first round to take a one-shot lead. Cristie Kerr led the way after the second round after shooting a one-under par 70 for 139 (−3). Top-ranked Lorena Ochoa struggled to a second round 79 (+8) and was nine strokes back at 148 (+6). The 36-hole cut was at 151 (+9) or better, which included seven amateurs among the 72 players who advanced to the weekend. In the third round, Kerr shot 72 (+1) for 211 (−2) and kept the lead, two strokes up on the field after 54 holes.

Ji won the championship after sinking a 20-foot (6 m) birdie putt on the 72nd hole to finish with an even-par 71 and 284, one stroke ahead of runner-up Kung. Ji held off the challenge of playing partner and third-round leader Cristie Kerr, who was chasing a second Open title but carded a 75 (+4) and finished two strokes back.

== Course layout ==
Old Course

| Hole | 1 | 2 | 3 | 4 | 5 | 6 | 7 | 8 | 9 | Out | 10 | 11 | 12 | 13 | 14 | 15 | 16 | 17 | 18 | In | Total |
|---|---|---|---|---|---|---|---|---|---|---|---|---|---|---|---|---|---|---|---|---|---|
| Yards | 549 | 435 | 373 | 154 | 409 | 559 | 453 | 387 | 210 | 3,529 | 332 | 165 | 555 | 433 | 399 | 339 | 374 | 170 | 444 | 3,211 | 6,740 |
| Par | 5 | 4 | 4 | 3 | 4 | 5 | 4 | 4 | 3 | 36 | 4 | 3 | 5 | 4 | 4 | 4 | 4 | 3 | 4 | 35 | 71 |

- Note: Holes 16–18 normally play as holes 10–12 for the members, while holes 10–15 normally play as holes 13–18, but they were re-routed for this championship.

== Round summaries ==
=== First round ===
Thursday, July 9, 2009

| Place | Player | Score | To par |
|---|---|---|---|
| 1 | (South Korea) Na Yeon Choi | 68 | −3 |
| T2 | (United States) Cristie Kerr | 69 | −2 |
| T2 | (Mexico) Lorena Ochoa | 69 | −2 |
| T2 | (United States) Jean Reynolds | 69 | −2 |
| 5 | (South Korea) Hee Young Park | 70 | −1 |
| T6 | (South Korea) Eun-Hee Ji | 71 | E |
| T6 | (South Korea) Young Kim | 71 | E |
| T6 | (United States) Candie Kung | 71 | E |
| T6 | (United States) Kristy McPherson | 71 | E |
| T6 | (Sweden) Anna Nordqvist | 71 | E |
| T6 | (United States) Lexi Thompson (a) | 71 | E |

=== Second round ===
Friday, July 10, 2009

| Place | Player | Score | To par |
|---|---|---|---|
| 1 | (United States) Cristie Kerr | 69-70=139 | −3 |
| 2 | (United States) Paula Creamer | 72-68=140 | −2 |
| 3 | (United States) Jean Reynolds | 69-72=141 | −1 |
| T4 | (Italy) Giulia Sergas | 75-67=142 | E |
| T4 | (South Korea) Na Yeon Choi | 68-74=142 | E |
| T6 | (South Korea) Song-Hee Kim | 74-69=143 | +1 |
| T6 | (South Korea) Eun-Hee Ji | 71-72=143 | +1 |
| T8 | (Australia) Lindsey Wright | 74-70=144 | +2 |
| T8 | (Japan) Yuri Fudoh | 73-71=144 | +2 |
| T8 | (South Korea) I.K. Kim | 72-72=144 | +2 |
| T8 | (United States) Brittany Lincicome | 72-72=144 | +2 |
| T8 | (United States) Lexi Thompson (a) | 71-73=144 | +2 |
| T8 | (South Korea) Hee Young Park | 70-74=144 | +2 |

- 72 players made the cut at 151 (+9) or better

=== Third round ===
Saturday, July 11, 2009

| Place | Player | Score | To par |
|---|---|---|---|
| 1 | (United States) Cristie Kerr | 69-70-72=211 | −2 |
| 2 | (South Korea) Eun-Hee Ji | 71-72-70=213 | E |
| T3 | (Taiwan) Teresa Lu | 76-69-70=215 | +2 |
| T3 | (United States) Jean Reynolds | 69-72-74=215 | +2 |
| T5 | (United States) Candie Kung | 71-77-68=216 | +3 |
| T5 | (South Korea) I.K. Kim | 72-72-72=216 | +3 |
| T5 | (South Korea) Hee Young Park | 70-74-72=216 | +3 |
| T8 | (South Korea) Kyeong Bae | 75-73-69=217 | +4 |
| T8 | (Norway) Suzann Pettersen | 74-71-72=217 | +4 |
| T8 | (United States) Brittany Lincicome | 72-72-73=217 | +4 |

=== Final round ===
Sunday, July 12, 2009

| Place | Player | Score | To par | Money ($) |
|---|---|---|---|---|
| 1 | (South Korea) Eun-Hee Ji | 71-72-70-71=284 | E | 585,000 |
| 2 | (United States) Candie Kung | 71-77-68-69=285 | +1 | 350,000 |
| T3 | (South Korea) I.K. Kim | 72-72-72-70=286 | +2 | 183,568 |
| T3 | (United States) Cristie Kerr | 69-70-72-75=286 | +2 | 183,568 |
| 5 | (United States) Brittany Lincicome | 72-72-73-70=287 | +3 | 122,415 |
| T6 | (United States) Paula Creamer | 72-68-79-69=288 | +4 | 99,126 |
| T6 | (Japan) Ai Miyazato | 74-74-71-69=288 | +4 | 99,126 |
| T6 | (Norway) Suzann Pettersen | 74-71-72-71=288 | +4 | 99,126 |
| T9 | (South Korea) Na Yeon Choi | 68-74-76-71=289 | +5 | 76,711 |
| T9 | (South Korea) Kyeong Bae | 75-73-69-72=289 | +5 | 76,711 |
| T9 | (South Korea) Hee Young Park | 70-74-72-73=289 | +5 | 76,711 |

==== Scorecard ====
Final round

| Hole | 1 | 2 | 3 | 4 | 5 | 6 | 7 | 8 | 9 | 10 | 11 | 12 | 13 | 14 | 15 | 16 | 17 | 18 |
|---|---|---|---|---|---|---|---|---|---|---|---|---|---|---|---|---|---|---|
| Par | 5 | 4 | 4 | 3 | 4 | 5 | 4 | 4 | 3 | 4 | 3 | 5 | 4 | 4 | 4 | 4 | 3 | 4 |
| (South Korea) Ji | E | +1 | +1 | +2 | +2 | +1 | +2 | +1 | +1 | +3 | +3 | +3 | +2 | +1 | +1 | +1 | +1 | E |
| (United States) Kung | +2 | +1 | +1 | +1 | +1 | +1 | +2 | +1 | +1 | +1 | +1 | E | E | E | E | E | +1 | +1 |
| (United States) Kerr | −1 | −1 | −2 | −2 | −1 | E | E | E | E | E | E | E | +1 | +1 | +1 | +2 | +2 | +2 |
| (South Korea) Kim | +3 | +3 | +3 | +3 | +2 | +2 | +4 | +3 | +2 | +2 | +2 | +2 | +2 | +2 | +2 | +1 | +1 | +2 |

Cumulative tournament scores, relative to par
