= Nikki Campbell =

Australian professional golfer

Personal information
- Full name: Nicola Jane Campbell
- Nationality: Australia
- Born: 9 September 1980 (age 46) Mississauga, Ontario, Canada
- Height: 1.67 m (5 ft 6 in)

Career
- Sport: Golf
- Turned professional: 2002
- Current tours: LPGA of Japan Tour; ALPG Tour; Ladies European Tour
- Professional wins: 3

Number of wins by tour
- LPGA of Japan Tour: 2
- WPGA Tour of Australasia: 1

Best results in LPGA major championships
- Chevron Championship: DNP
- Women's PGA C'ship: DNP
- U.S. Women's Open: T46: 2014
- Women's British Open: T38: 2014
- Evian Championship: CUT: 2014

Nicola Jane "Nikki" Campbell (born 9 September 1980) is an Australian professional golfer.

== Career ==
Campbell was born in Mississauga, Ontario, Canada. At the age of three, she moved with her family to Australia in 1983. At the age of 12, she began playing golf at the Federal Golf Club in Canberra.

She turned pro in 2002, and has played mostly on the LPGA of Japan Tour, but has played in some LPGA Tour tournaments. She has won three tournaments, most recently the Fujitsu Ladies at the Seven Hundred Club in Chiba, Japan.

== Personal life ==
Her brother Chris Campbell is a professional golfer on the Japan Golf Tour.

== Professional wins (3) ==
=== LPGA of Japan Tour wins (2) ===
- 2006 Suntory Ladies Open
- 2009 Fujitsu Ladies

=== ALPG Tour wins (1) ===
- 2005 ABC Learning Centres & FADL Group Ladies Classic

== Team appearances ==
Amateur

- Tasman Cup (representing Australia): 2001 (winners)
- Queen Sirikit Cup (representing Australia): 2002

Professional

- Lexus Cup (representing International team): 2006, 2007, 2008 (winners)
- The Queens (representing Australia): 2015
