= 2014 International Crown =

Coordinates: 39.451°N 76.744°W

Tournament information
- Dates: July 24–27, 2014
- Location: Owings Mills, Maryland, U.S.
- Course: Caves Valley Golf Club
- Organized by: LPGA
- Format: Team – match play

Statistics
- Par: 71
- Length: 6,628 yards (6,061 m)
- Field: 32 players; 8 nations, 4 players each
- Cut: 20 players to Sunday singles (5 teams)
- Prize fund: $1.6 million
- Winner's share: $400,000 team ($100,000 per player)

Champion
- Spain
- 15 points, (7–2–1, .750)

Location in the United States
Location in Maryland

The 2014 International Crown was a women's golf team event organized by the LPGA, played July 24–27 at the Caves Valley Golf Club in Owings Mills, Maryland, a suburb northwest of Baltimore. This was the inaugural International Crown, a biennial match play event contested between teams of four players representing eight countries. The field in 2014 consisted of 31 professionals and one amateur, and the winning team, Spain, earned $400,000, or $100,000 per player.

== Format ==
The first three days, Thursday through Saturday, featured round-robin pool play matches at fourball. Each match was worth two points for a win and one point for a halve. Following the completion of pool play, the top two teams in each pool and one wild card team (determined by a playoff of the third place teams) advanced to singles play. The five remaining teams were re-seeded based on points earned in pool play, and each team played one singles match against each of the other teams on Sunday. The total points earned in pool and singles play determined the team champion.

== Course ==
Hole	1	2	3	4	5	6	7	8	9	Out	10	11	12	13	14	15	16	17	18	In	Total
Yards	322	428	182	544	335	180	400	404	428	3,223	432	347	482	168	412	425	539	187	413	3,405	6,628
Par	4	4	3	5	4	3	4	4	4	35	4	4	5	3	4	4	5	3	4	36	71

== Teams ==
On November 13, 2013, eight teams qualified to participate in this event, based on the combined world rankings of the top four players from each country: Australia, Chinese Taipei, Japan, South Korea, Spain, Sweden, Thailand, and the United States. The team members were finalized on March 31, 2014, and divided into two pools. Due to a world rankings error, the teams from Australia and Chinese Taipei switched seeds and pools.

=== Initial ===
Teams
Pool	Seed	Rank	Country
A	1	32	United States
B	2	33	South Korea
B	3	131	Japan
A	4	230	Thailand
A	5	236	Spain
B	6	318	Sweden
A	7	351	Chinese Taipei
B	8	360	Australia

Pool A	Pool B
#1 United States: Rank / Player; 3 / Stacy Lewis; 8 / Paula Creamer; 9 / Lexi Thompson; 12 / Cristie Kerr	#2 South Korea: Rank / Player; 1 / Inbee Park; 6 / Ryu So-yeon; 11 / Choi Na-yeon; 15 / In-Kyung Kim
#4 Thailand: Rank / Player; 30 / Pornanong Phatlum; 34 / Ariya Jutanugarn; 80 / Moriya Jutanugarn; 86 / Onnarin Sattayabanphot	#3 Japan: Rank / Player; 27 / Mika Miyazato; 31 / Ai Miyazato; 36 / Rikako Morita; 37 / Sakura Yokomine
#5 Spain: Rank / Player; 19 / Azahara Muñoz; 23 / Beatriz Recari; 45 / Carlota Ciganda; 149 / Belén Mozo	#6 Sweden: Rank / Player; 10 / Anna Nordqvist; 24 / Caroline Hedwall; 112 / Pernilla Lindberg; 172 / Mikaela Parmlid
#8 Australia: Rank / Player; 5 / Karrie Webb; 110 / Minjee Lee (a); 115 / Katherine Kirk; 130 / Lindsey Wright	#7 Chinese Taipei: Rank / Player; 46 / Yani Tseng; 48 / Teresa Lu; 97 / Candie Kung; 160 / Phoebe Yao

=== Revised ===
Teams
Pool	Seed	Rank	Country
A	1	32	United States
B	2	33	South Korea
B	3	131	Japan
A	4	230	Thailand
A	5	239	Spain
B	6	321	Sweden
A	7	323	Australia
B	8	357	Chinese Taipei

Pool A	Pool B
#1 United States: Rank / Player; 3 / Stacy Lewis; 8 / Paula Creamer; 9 / Lexi Thompson; 12 / Cristie Kerr	#2 South Korea: Rank / Player; 1 / Inbee Park; 6 / Ryu So-yeon; 11 / Choi Na-yeon; 15 / In-Kyung Kim
#4 Thailand: Rank / Player; 30 / Pornanong Phatlum; 32 / Ariya Jutanugarn; 81 / Moriya Jutanugarn; 87 / Onnarin Sattayabanphot	#3 Japan: Rank / Player; 27 / Mika Miyazato; 31 / Ai Miyazato; 36 / Rikako Morita; 37 / Sakura Yokomine
#5 Spain: Rank / Player; 19 / Azahara Muñoz; 23 / Beatriz Recari; 45 / Carlota Ciganda; 152 / Belén Mozo	#6 Sweden: Rank / Player; 10 / Anna Nordqvist; 24 / Caroline Hedwall; 114 / Pernilla Lindberg; 173 / Mikaela Parmlid
#8 Chinese Taipei: Rank / Player; 46 / Yani Tseng; 48 / Teresa Lu; 99 / Candie Kung; 164 / Phoebe Yao	#7 Australia: Rank / Player; 5 / Karrie Webb; 78 / Minjee Lee (a); 117 / Katherine Kirk; 123 / Lindsey Wright

Late changes: for Japan, Rikako Morita declined to play; Shiho Oyama (ranked 47), the first alternate, also declined to play; Mamiko Higa (ranked 50) finalized the Japanese team.

== Results ==
=== Day one pool play ===
Thursday, July 24, 2014

Pool A

- United States vs. Chinese Taipei
  - Match 7: Kung/Lu (TPE) defeated Creamer/Kerr (USA), 4 & 3
  - Match 8: Tseng/Yao (TPE) defeated Lewis/Thompson (USA), 1 up
- Thailand vs. Spain
  - Match 1: Ciganda/Muñoz (ESP) defeated Phatlum/Sattayabanphot (THA), 3 & 2
  - Match 2: A. Jutanugarn/M. Jutanugarn (THA) and Mozo/Recari (ESP), halved

Standings

Seed	Team	Points	Win	Loss	Tie
8	Chinese Taipei	4	2	0	0
5	Spain	3	1	0	1
4	Thailand	1	0	1	1
1	United States	0	0	2	0

Pool B

- South Korea vs. Australia
  - Match 5: Park/Ryu (KOR) defeated Kirk/Wright (AUS), 3 & 2
  - Match 6: Lee/Webb (AUS) defeated Choi/Kim (KOR), 2 up
- Japan vs. Sweden
  - Match 3: Higa/M. Miyazato (JPN) and Hedwall/Nordqvist (SWE), halved
  - Match 4: Yokomine/A. Miyazato (JPN) defeated Lindberg/Parmlid (SWE), 2 up

Standings

Seed	Team	Points	Win	Loss	Tie
3	Japan	3	1	0	1
2	South Korea	2	1	1	0
7	Australia	2	1	1	0
6	Sweden	1	0	1	1

=== Day two pool play ===
Friday, July 25, 2014

Pool A

- United States vs. Spain
  - Match 15: Kerr/Thompson (USA) defeated Mozo/Recari (ESP), 3 & 2
  - Match 16: Creamer/Lewis (USA) defeated Ciganda/Muñoz (ESP), 2 up
- Thailand vs. Chinese Taipei
  - Match 9: A. Jutanugarn/M. Jutanugarn (THA) defeated Kung/Lu (TPE), 3 & 2
  - Match 10: Phatlum/Sattayabanphot (THA) defeated Tseng/Yao (TPE), 1 up

Standings

Seed	Team	Points	Win	Loss	Tie
4	Thailand	5	2	1	1
1	United States	4	2	2	0
8	Chinese Taipei	4	2	2	0
5	Spain	3	1	2	1

Pool B

- South Korea vs. Sweden
  - Match 13: Hedwall/Nordqvist (SWE) defeated Park/Ryu (KOR), 1 up
  - Match 14: Choi/Kim (KOR) defeated Lindberg/Parmlid (SWE), 1 up
- Japan vs. Australia
  - Match 11: Higa/M. Miyazato (JPN) defeated Lee/Webb (AUS), 3 & 2
  - Match 12: A. Miyazato/Yokomine (JPN) and Kirk/Wright (AUS), halved

Standings

Seed	Team	Points	Win	Loss	Tie
3	Japan	6	2	0	2
2	South Korea	4	2	2	0
6	Sweden	3	1	2	1
7	Australia	3	1	2	1

=== Day three pool play ===
Saturday, July 26, 2014

Pool A

- United States vs. Thailand
  - Match 23: Kerr/Thompson (USA) defeated A. Jutanugarn/M. Jutanugarn (THA), 3 & 2
  - Match 24: Phatlum/Sattayabanphot (THA) defeated Creamer/Lewis (USA), 1 up
- Spain vs. Chinese Taipei
  - Match 19: Ciganda/Muñoz (ESP) defeated Tseng/Yao (TPE), 6 & 5
  - Match 20: Mozo/Recari (ESP) defeated Kung/Lu (TPE), 2 up

Standings

Seed	Team	Points	Win	Loss	Tie
5	Spain	7	3	2	1
4	Thailand	7	3	2	1
1	United States	6	3	3	0
8	Chinese Taipei	4	2	4	0

Pool B

- South Korea vs. Japan
  - Match 21: Park/Ryu (KOR) defeated Higa/M. Miyazato (JPN), 4 & 3
  - Match 22: A. Miyazato/Yokomine (JPN) defeated Choi/Kim (KOR), 3 & 2
- Sweden vs. Australia
  - Match 17: Hedwall/Nordqvist (SWE) defeated vs. Lee/Webb (AUS), 4 & 3
  - Match 18: Lindberg/Parmlid (SWE) defeated Kirk/Wright (AUS), 7 & 5

Standings

Seed	Team	Points	Win	Loss	Tie
3	Japan	8	3	1	2
6	Sweden	7	3	2	1
2	South Korea	6	3	3	0
7	Australia	3	1	4	1

Wild card

Spain and Thailand advanced to singles played from pool A and Japan and Sweden advanced from pool B. The United States and South Korea each finished third in pool play and engaged in a sudden-death playoff for the wild card spot in singles play. Park and Ryu (KOR) eliminated Kerr and Thompson (USA) on the first playoff hole and South Korea advanced to singles play.

Standings

Reseed	Team	Points	Win	Loss	Tie
1	Japan	8	3	1	2
2	Spain	7	3	2	1
3	Thailand	7	3	2	1
4	Sweden	7	3	2	1
5	South Korea	6	3	3	0

=== Singles play ===
Sunday, July 27, 2014

Spain swept its four singles matches and secured the title after the third win. Sweden and South Korea both won two matches while Japan and Thailand had one victory each.

- Match 25: Park (KOR) defeated Hedwall (SWE), 4 & 2
- Match 26: Phatlum (THA) defeated Kim (KOR), 1 up
- Match 27: Lindberg (SWE) defeated A. Jutanugarn (THA), 6 & 5
- Match 28: Ciganda (ESP) defeated Choi (KOR), 8 & 6
- Match 29: Ryu (KOR) defeated Yokomine (JPN), 1 up
- Match 30: Recari (ESP) defeated Parmlid (SWE), 3 & 2
- Match 31: Nordqvist (SWE) defeated Higa (JPN), 3 & 2
- Match 32: Mozo (ESP) defeated M. Jutanugarn (THA), 3 & 2
- Match 33: M. Miyazato (JPN) defeated Sattayabanphot (THA), 3 & 1
- Match 34: Muñoz (ESP) defeated A. Miyazato (JPN), 2 & 1

== Final standings ==
Place	Team	Points	Win	Loss	Tie	Money ($) (per player)
1	Spain	15	7	2	1	100,000
2	Sweden	11	5	4	1	60,000
T3	South Korea	10	5	5	0	50,000
T3	Japan	10	4	4	2	50,000
5	Thailand	9	4	5	1	42,500
6	United States	6	3	3	0	35,000
7	Chinese Taipei	4	2	4	0	32,500
8	Australia	3	1	4	1	30,000
