= Golf at the 2002 Asian Games – Women's individual =

Women's individual at the 2002 Asian Games
- Venue: Asiad Country Club
- Date: 3 October 2002 – 6 October 2002
- Competitors: 17 from 6 nations

Medalists
gold medal	Ai Miyazato	Japan
silver medal	Kim Joo-mi	South Korea
bronze medal	Park Won-mi	South Korea

The women's individual competition at the 2002 Asian Games in Busan was held from 3 October to 6 October at the Asiad Country Club.

== Schedule ==
All times are Korea Standard Time (UTC+09:00)

Date	Time	Event
Thursday, 3 October 2002	10:39	Round 1
Friday, 4 October 2002	10:39	Round 2
Saturday, 5 October 2002	10:39	Round 3
Sunday, 6 October 2002	10:39	Round 4

== Results ==
Rank	Athlete	Round				Total	To par
Rank	Athlete	1	2	3	4	Total	To par
1st place, gold medalist(s)	Ai Miyazato (JPN)	74	70	72	70	286	−2
2nd place, silver medalist(s)	Kim Joo-mi (KOR)	73	70	70	78	291	+3
3rd place, bronze medalist(s)	Park Won-mi (KOR)	75	75	72	71	293	+5
4	Ayako Uehara (JPN)	73	72	77	75	297	+9
5	Ria Quiazon (PHI)	78	72	71	77	298	+10
6	Yim Sung-ah (KOR)	80	72	73	74	299	+11
7	Sakura Yokomine (JPN)	74	77	73	77	301	+13
8	Hung Chin-huei (TPE)	74	76	80	74	304	+16
9	Heidi Chua (PHI)	76	78	78	76	308	+20
10	Virada Nirapathpongporn (THA)	80	75	78	77	310	+22
11	Yu Pei-lin (TPE)	77	80	76	78	311	+23
12	Carmelette Villaroman (PHI)	77	76	80	80	313	+25
13	Shih Huei-ju (TPE)	81	75	77	82	315	+27
13	Porani Chutichai (THA)	86	76	76	77	315	+27
13	Sirapa Kasemsamran (THA)	78	80	75	82	315	+27
16	Myrna Raad (LIB)	84	77	84	86	331	+43
17	Rima Arab (LIB)	102	94	93	114	403	+115
