= SBS Open at Turtle Bay =

Golf tournament formerly on the LPGA Tour

Tournament information
- Location: Hawaii
- Established: 2005
- Course: Turtle Bay Resort
- Par: 72
- Length: 6,582 yards
- Tour: LPGA Tour
- Format: Stroke play (54 holes)
- Prize fund: US$1,200,000
- Month played: February
- Final year: 2009

Tournament record score
- Aggregate: 206 Angela Stanford (2009); Annika Sörenstam (2008); Joo Mi Kim (2006)
- To par: −10 Angela Stanford (2009); Annika Sörenstam (2008); Joo Mi Kim (2006)

Final champion
- Angela Stanford

The SBS Open at Turtle Bay was a golf tournament for professional female golfers, played on the LPGA Tour that took place between 2005 and 2009 on the Palmer Course at Turtle Bay Resort in Oahu, Hawaii, USA.

The tournament title sponsor was SBS, formerly the Seoul Broadcasting System, one of four major national South Korean television and radio networks.

SBS discontinued its sponsorship after the 2009 tournament and the LPGA failed to secure another sponsor.

== Winners ==
| Year | Dates | Champion | Country | Score | Purse ($) | Winner's share ($) |
|---|---|---|---|---|---|---|
| 2009 | Feb 12–14 | Angela Stanford | United States | 206 (−10) | 1,200,000 | 180,000 |
| 2008 | Feb 14–16 | Annika Sörenstam | Sweden | 206 (−10) | 1,100,000 | 165,000 |
| 2007 | Feb 15–17 | Paula Creamer | United States | 207 (−9) | 1,100,000 | 165,000 |
| 2006 | Feb 16–18 | Joo Mi Kim | South Korea | 206 (−10) | 1,000,000 | 150,000 |
| 2005 | Feb 24–26 | Jennifer Rosales | Philippines | 208 (−8) | 1,000,000 | 150,000 |

== Tournament record ==
| Year | Player | Score | Round |
|---|---|---|---|
| 2006 | Joo Mi Kim | 65 (−7) | 2nd |
| 2006 | Lorena Ochoa | 65 (−7) | 2nd |
| 2008 | Angela Park | 65 (−7) | 2nd |
| 2009 | Angela Stanford | 65 (−7) | 1st |
