= Teresa Lu =

Taiwanese professional golfer (born 1987)

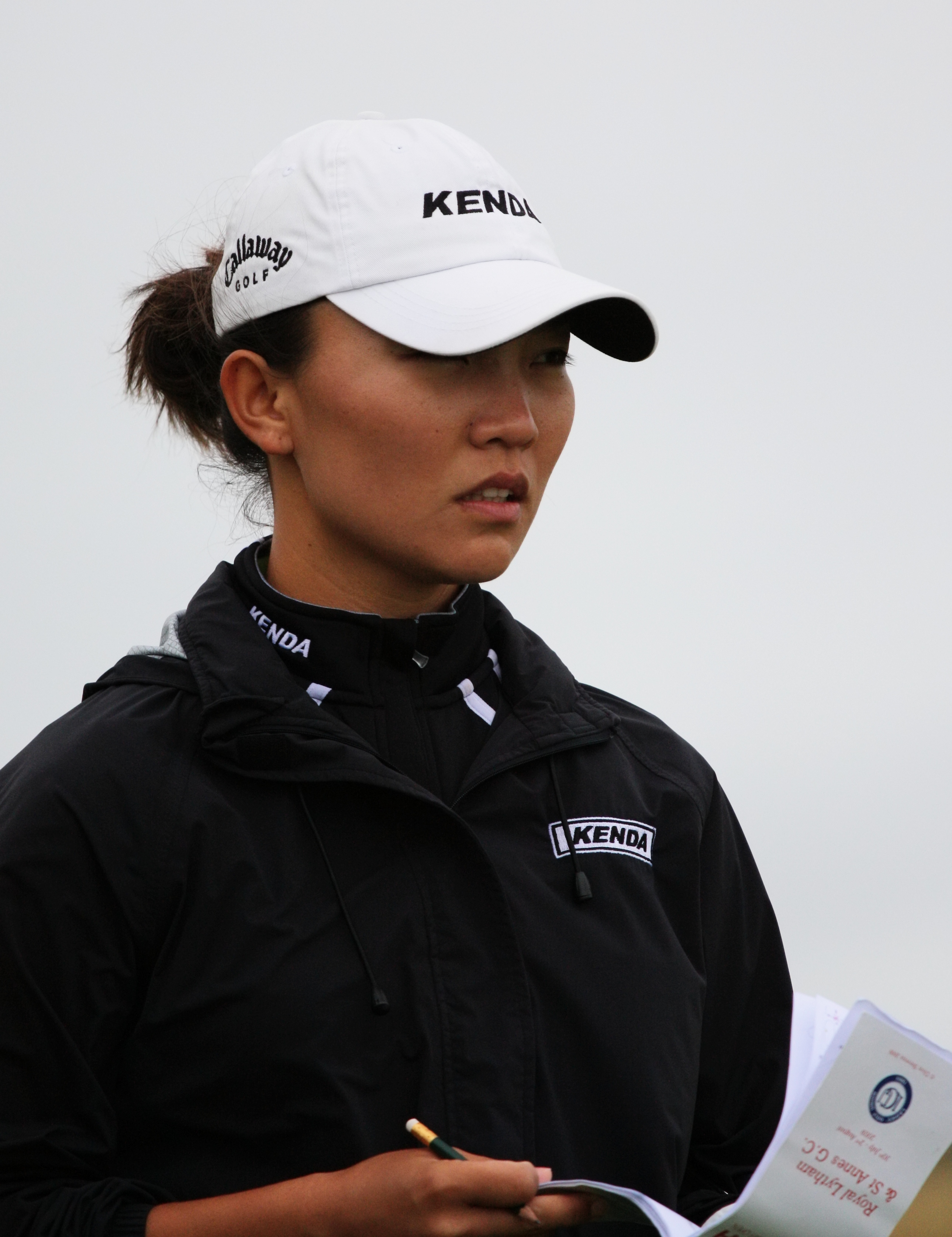
- Lu in 2009

Personal information
- Nationality: Taiwan
- Born: 13 October 1987 (age 39) Taipei, Taiwan
- Height: 5 ft 4.5 in (1.64 m)

Career
- Sport: Golf
- Turned professional: 2005
- Current tour: LPGA of Japan Tour (2010–)
- Former tours: Ladies Asian Golf Tour (2006–2007); LPGA Tour (2006–2010)
- Professional wins: 20

Number of wins by tour
- LPGA Tour: 1
- LPGA of Japan Tour: 16
- Ladies Asian Golf Tour: 2
- Other: 2

Best results in LPGA major championships
- Chevron Championship: T35: 2015
- Women's PGA C'ship: T30: 2007
- U.S. Women's Open: T10: 2008
- Women's British Open: 6th: 2015
- Evian Championship: DNP

Teresa Lu
- Traditional Chinese: 盧曉晴
- Simplified Chinese: 卢晓晴
Transcriptions
Standard Mandarin
- Hanyu Pinyin: Lú Xiǎoqíng

Teresa Lu (born 13 October 1987) is a Taiwanese professional golfer.

== Career ==
Lu was born in 1987

From 2006 to 2010, she played on the LPGA Tour. She also played on the Ladies Asian Golf Tour in 2006 and 2007.

She has played on the LPGA of Japan Tour (JLPGA) since 2010. She won the Mizuno Classic in 2013, a tournament co-sanctioned by the LPGA and JLPGA. She picked up three additional wins on the JLPGA in 2014 and five in 2015. She also won twice as a non-member on the Ladies Asian Golf Tour in 2012. She finished second on the money list in both 2014 and 2015. Her highest position in world ranking is 19th.

== Professional wins (20) ==
=== LPGA Tour wins (1) ===
No.	Date	Tournament	Winning score	To par	Margin of victory	Runner-up
1	10 Nov 2013	Mizuno Classic^	70-68-64=202	−14	2 strokes	(South Korea) Chella Choi

=== LPGA of Japan Tour wins (16) ===
No.	Date	Tournament	Winning score	To par	Margin of victory	Runner(s)-up
1	10 Nov 2013	Mizuno Classic^	70-68-64=202	−14	2 strokes	(South Korea) Chella Choi
2	1 Jun 2014	Resort Trust Ladies	67-70-64=201	−15	5 strokes	(South Korea) Lee Ji-min
3	5 Oct 2014	Japan Women's Open Golf Championship	69-71-73-67=280	−8	1 stroke	(South Korea) Lee Na-ri
4	30 Nov 2014	Japan LPGA Tour Championship Ricoh Cup	69-67-70-72=278	−10	Playoff	(Japan) Lala Anai
5	8 Mar 2015	Daikin Orchid Ladies	69-68-65=202	−14	4 strokes	(Japan) Rikako Morita
6	31 May 2015	Resort Trust Ladies	68-67-67=202	−14	1 stroke	(South Korea) Jiyai Shin
7	16 Aug 2015	NEC Karuizawa 72	64-71-67=202	−14	2 strokes	(Japan) Miki Saiki (Japan) Ayaka Watanabe
8	13 Sep 2015	Japan LPGA Championship Konica Minolta Cup	73-67-70-71=281	−7	2 strokes	(Japan) Miki Saiki (Japan) Momoko Ueda
9	18 Oct 2015	Fujitsu Ladies	67-65-71=203	−13	4 strokes	(Japan) Ayaka Watanabe
10	4 Mar 2016	Daikin Orchid Ladies	70-70-72-68=280	−8	2 strokes	(Japan) Yukari Nishiyama (Japan) Ritsuko Ryu
11	18 Sep 2016	Munsingwear Ladies Tokai Classic	65-63-70=198	−18	Playoff	(South Korea) Jeon Mi-jeong
12	20 Nov 2016	Daio Paper Elleair Ladies Open	67-62-67-68=264	−24	1 stroke	(Japan) Mamiko Higa
13	9 Apr 2017	Studio Alice Women's Open	68-69-68=205	−11	3 strokes	(South Korea) Kim Ha-neul (South Korea) Jiyai Shin
14	18 Jun 2017	Nichirei Ladies	68-65-71=204	−12	5 strokes	(South Korea) Miyu Shinkai (Japan) Saki Takeo (South Korea) Rumi Yoshiba
15	15 Oct 2017	Fujitsu Ladies	68-67-67=202	−14	2 strokes	(South Korea) Lee Min-young
16	26 Nov 2017	Japan LPGA Tour Championship Ricoh Cup	68-68-67-70=273	−15	4 strokes	(South Korea) Lee Min-young

=== Ladies Asian Golf Tour wins (2) ===
No.	Date	Tournament	Winning score	To par	Margin of victory	Runner-up
1	8 Jan 2012	Hitachi Ladies Classic	70-70-72=212	−4	1 stroke	(United States) Danah Bordner (Taiwan) Amy Hung
2	16 Dec 2012	Taifong Ladies Open	73-67-67=207	−9	5 strokes	(Taiwan) Amy Hung

^ 2013 Mizuno Classic co-sanctioned by LPGA of Japan Tour and LPGA Tour.

=== China LPGA Tour wins (1) ===
- 2016 CTBC Ladies Open

=== Taiwan LPGA Tour wins (1) ===
- 2025 Friends of TLPGA Open

== Team appearances ==
Professional

- International Crown (representing Chinese Taipei): 2014, 2016, 2018
