= Golf at the 2002 Asian Games – Women's team =

Women's team at the 2002 Asian Games
- Venue: Asiad Country Club
- Date: 3 October 2002 – 6 October 2002
- Competitors: 17 from 6 nations

Medalists
gold medal	South Korea; Kim Joo-mi, Park Won-mi, Yim Sung-ah
silver medal	Japan; Ai Miyazato, Ayako Uehara, Sakura Yokomine
bronze medal	Philippines; Heidi Chua, Ria Quiazon, Carmelette Villaroman

The women's team competition at the 2002 Asian Games in Busan was held from 3 October to 6 October at the Asiad Country Club.

== Schedule ==
All times are Korea Standard Time (UTC+09:00)

Date	Time	Event
Thursday, 3 October 2002	10:39	Round 1
Friday, 4 October 2002	10:39	Round 2
Saturday, 5 October 2002	10:39	Round 3
Sunday, 6 October 2002	10:39	Round 4

== Results ==
Rank	Team	Round				Total	To par
Rank	Team	1	2	3	4	Total	To par
1st place, gold medalist(s)	South Korea (KOR)	148	142	142	145	577	+1
	Kim Joo-mi	73	70	70	~~78~~		
	Park Won-mi	75	~~75~~	72	71		
	Yim Sung-ah	~~80~~	72	73	74		
2nd place, silver medalist(s)	Japan (JPN)	147	142	145	145	579	+3
	Ai Miyazato	~~74~~	70	72	70		
	Ayako Uehara	73	72	~~77~~	75		
	Sakura Yokomine	74	~~77~~	73	~~77~~		
3rd place, bronze medalist(s)	Philippines (PHI)	153	148	149	153	603	+27
	Heidi Chua	76	~~78~~	78	76		
	Ria Quiazon	~~78~~	72	71	77		
	Carmelette Villaroman	77	76	~~80~~	~~80~~		
4	Chinese Taipei (TPE)	151	151	153	152	607	+31
	Hung Chin-huei	74	76	~~80~~	74		
	Shih Huei-ju	~~81~~	75	77	~~82~~		
	Yu Pei-lin	77	~~80~~	76	78		
5	Thailand (THA)	158	151	151	154	614	+38
	Porani Chutichai	~~86~~	76	76	77		
	Sirapa Kasemsamran	78	~~80~~	75	~~82~~		
	Virada Nirapathpongporn	80	75	~~78~~	77		
6	Lebanon (LIB)	186	171	177	200	734	+158
	Rima Arab	102	94	93	114		
	Myrna Raad	84	77	84	86		
