= 2006 Lexus Cup =

- Dates: 15–17 December 2006
- Venue: Tanah Merah Country Club
- Location: Singapore
- Captains: Grace Park (Asia); Annika Sörenstam (International)
| Asia | 12½ | 11½ | International |
- Asia wins the Lexus Cup

The 2006 Lexus Cup was a golf event competed by women representing Asia and an International squad representing the rest of the world. Each team was made up of twelve members. The competition took place at the Tanah Merah Country Club in Singapore from 15 to 17 December 2006. Lexus was the title sponsor while Rolex, DBS, Singapore Airlines and Singapore Sports Council were main sponsors. The Asian team took a dramatic 12½ to 11½ victory in the second annual event, tying the all-time series 1–1.

== Teams ==
As in the similar team events of the Ryder Cup (USA vs. Europe men), Presidents Cup (USA vs. "International" men, i.e. rest of the world excluding Europe), and Solheim Cup (USA vs. Europe women), each team consisted of twelve players.

Asia

- Sponsor's Picks
  - Grace Park (captain) - Seoul, South Korea
  - Sakura Yokomine - Kagoshima, Japan
- Rolex Women's World Ranking Qualification
  - Se Ri Pak - Daejeon, South Korea
  - Hee-Won Han - Seoul, South Korea
  - Seon Hwa Lee - Chonnan, South Korea
  - Jee Young Lee - Seoul, South Korea
- ADT Official Money List Qualification
  - Meena Lee - Jeonju, South Korea
  - Shi Hyun Ahn - Incheon, South Korea
  - Joo Mi Kim - Seoul, South Korea
  - Young Kim - Chuncheon, South Korea
- Captains Picks
  - Candie Kung - Kaohsiung, Taiwan
  - Jennifer Rosales - Manila, Philippines

International

- Rolex Women's World Rankings
  - Annika Sörenstam (captain) - Stockholm, Sweden
  - (United States) Paula Creamer - Mountain View, California
  - Julieta Granada - Asunción, Paraguay
  - (United States) Natalie Gulbis - Sacramento, California
- ADT Official Money List Qualification
  - (United States) Brittany Lincicome - St. Petersburg, Florida
  - (United States) Sherri Steinhauer - Madison, Wisconsin
  - (United States) Stacy Prammanasudh - Enid, Oklahoma
  - (United States) Angela Stanford - Fort Worth, Texas
- Captain's Picks
  - Laura Davies - Coventry, England
  - Carin Koch - Kungalv, Sweden
- Sponsor's Picks
  - (United States) Morgan Pressel - Tampa, Florida
  - Nikki Campbell - Australia

== Day one ==
15 December 2006

Day one saw six foursome matches where each team put two golfers on the course for each match, with the two playing alternate shots. Asia won two matches, the international team won two with two ending all square, resulting in a three-to-three tie after the first day of play. The comeback of the day was Jee Young Lee and Meena Lee coming back from four behind at the turn to defeat Natalie Gulbis and Paula Creamer 2 up.

| Asia Team | Results | International Team |
|---|---|---|
| Young Kim/Seon Hwa Lee | Asia 6&5 | Brittany Lincicome/Laura Davies |
| Jee Young Lee/Meena Lee | Asia 2 up | Natalie Gulbis/Paula Creamer |
| Grace Park/Shi Hyun Ahn | Halved | Angela Stanford/Stacy Prammanasudh |
| Hee-Won Han/Se Ri Pak | Int'l 4&3 | Morgan Pressel/Julieta Granada |
| Joo Mi Kim/Sakura Yokomine | Int'l 3&2 | Carin Koch/Annika Sörenstam |
| Candie Kung/Jennifer Rosales | Halved | Sherri Steinhauer/Nikki Campbell |
| 3 | Foursomes | 3 |
| 3 | Overall | 3 |

== Day two ==
16 December 2006

The two teams matched up in four ball competition on day two. South Koreans Grace Park and Hee-Won Han won a thrilling match at the last hole against youngsters Morgan Pressel and Julieta Granada of the United States and Paraguay respectively. Candie Kung of Taiwan and Jennifer Rosales of the Philippines cruised to a relatively easy win over Brittany Lincicome of the United States and Nikki Campbell of Australia. Koreans Seon Hwa Lee and Se Ri Pak had an even easier victory over Americans Sherri Steinhauer and Angela Stanford to give the Asians the lead going into Sunday's singles.

| Asia Team | Results | International Team |
|---|---|---|
| Meena Lee/Jee Young Lee | Int'l 2 up | Natalie Gulbis/Annika Sörenstam |
| Hee-Won Han/Grace Park | Asia 1 up | Morgan Pressel/Julieta Granada |
| Shi Hyun Ahn/Joo Mi Kim | Int'l 3&2 | Paula Creamer/Stacy Prammanasudh |
| Candie Kung/Jennifer Rosales | Asia 3&1 | Brittany Lincicome/Nikki Campbell |
| Young Kim/Sakura Yokomine | Asia 2 up | Laura Davies/Carin Koch |
| Seon Hwa Lee/Se Ri Pak | Asia 4&2 | Sherri Steinhauer/Angela Stanford |
| 4 | Four balls | 2 |
| 7 | Overall | 5 |

== Day three ==
17 December 2006

Day three went to the very final match as Seon Hwa Lee broke an 11 1/2-all tie on the seventeenth hole against Julieta Granada by halving it to ensure a one-point victory for Team Asia. This happened after two delays due to lightning that cast doubt on whether play would he completed on day three. The International team got off to a good start to the day, resulting in the drama that lasted right until the very end. The second match between Taiwan's Candie Kung and Paula Creamer from the United States went back and forth all the way with three lead changes, the last occurring on the 18th as Creamer took the point, winning the last hole and bringing the Internationals within reach. However, it was not to be as the Asians held on for a dramatic victory.

| Asia Team | Results | International Team |
|---|---|---|
| Grace Park | Int'l 4&3 | Annika Sörenstam |
| Candie Kung | Int'l 1 up | Paula Creamer |
| Meena Lee | Halved | Angela Stanford |
| Jee Young Lee | Asia 5&4 | Morgan Pressel |
| Shi Hyun Ahn | Int'l 4&3 | Stacy Prammanasudh |
| Young Kim | Asia 3&2 | Carin Koch |
| Hee-Won Han | Asia 3&2 | Nikki Campbell |
| Jennifer Rosales | Int'l 4&3 | Sherri Steinhauer |
| Sakura Yokomine | Asia 4&3 | Laura Davies |
| Joo Mi Kim | Int'l 5&4 | Natalie Gulbis |
| Seon Hwa Lee | Asia 2&1 | Julieta Granada |
| Se Ri Pak | Int'l 4&2 | Brittany Lincicome |
| 5 1/2 | Singles | 6 1/2 |
| 12 1/2 | Overall | 11 1/2 |

== Golfer records ==
| Golfer | Country | Wins | Halves | Losses |
|---|---|---|---|---|
| Young Kim | South Korea | 3 | 0 | 0 |
| Seon Hwa Lee | South Korea | 3 | 0 | 0 |
| Annika Sörenstam | Sweden | 3 | 0 | 0 |
| Stacy Prammanasudh | United States | 2 | 1 | 0 |
| Jee Young Lee | South Korea | 2 | 0 | 1 |
| Natalie Gulbis | United States | 2 | 0 | 1 |
| Paula Creamer | United States | 2 | 0 | 1 |
| Hee-Won Han | South Korea | 2 | 0 | 1 |
| Sakura Yokomine | Japan | 2 | 0 | 1 |
| Grace Park | South Korea | 1 | 1 | 1 |
| Candie Kung | Taiwan | 1 | 1 | 1 |
| Jennifer Rosales | Philippines | 1 | 1 | 1 |
| Sherri Steinhauer | United States | 1 | 1 | 1 |
| Meena Lee | South Korea | 1 | 1 | 1 |
| Morgan Pressel | United States | 1 | 0 | 2 |
| Julieta Granada | Paraguay | 1 | 0 | 2 |
| Carin Koch | Sweden | 1 | 0 | 2 |
| Se Ri Pak | South Korea | 1 | 0 | 2 |
| Brittany Lincicome | United States | 1 | 0 | 2 |
| Angela Stanford | United States | 0 | 2 | 1 |
| Shi Hyun Ahn | South Korea | 0 | 1 | 2 |
| Nikki Campbell | Australia | 0 | 1 | 2 |
| Laura Davies | England | 0 | 0 | 3 |
| Joo Mi Kim | South Korea | 0 | 0 | 3 |
