= 2013 LPGA of Japan Tour =

The 2013 LPGA of Japan Tour was the 46th season of the LPGA of Japan Tour, the professional golf tour for women operated by the Ladies Professional Golfers' Association of Japan. It consisted of 36 golf tournaments, all played in Japan.

Leading money winner was Rikako Morita with ¥126,675,049. Sakura Yokomine won the Mercedes Ranking and finished most often (16 times) inside the top-10. Ahn Sun-ju had the lowest scoring average.

== Schedule ==
The number in parentheses after winners' names show the player's total number wins in official money individual events on the LPGA of Japan Tour, including that event.

Dates	Tournament	Location	Prize fund (¥)	Winner
Mar 8–10	Daikin Orchid Ladies Golf Tournament	Okinawa	80,000,000	(Japan) Rikako Morita (3)
Mar 15–17	Yokohama Tire Golf Tournament PRGR Ladies Cup	Kōchi	80,000,000	(South Korea) Jeon Mi-jeong (22)
Mar 22–24	T-Point Ladies Golf Tournament	Kagoshima	70,000,000	(Japan) Yuki Ichinose (1)
Mar 29–31	AXA Ladies Golf Tournament in Miyazaki	Miyazaki	80,000,000	(Japan) Natsuka Hori (1)
Apr 4–7	Yamaha Ladies Open Katsuragi	Shizuoka	100,000,000	(Japan) Mamiko Higa (1)
Apr 12–14	Studio Alice Women's Open	Hyogo	60,000,000	(South Korea) Kim Na-ri (2)
Apr 19–21	KKT Cup Vantelin Ladies Open	Kumamoto	70,000,000	(Japan) Miki Saiki (6)
Apr 26–28	Fuji Sankei Ladies Classic	Shizuoka	80,000,000	(Japan) Miki Saiki (7)
May 3–5	CyberAgent Ladies Golf Tournament	Chiba	70,000,000	(Japan) Sakura Yokomine (19)
May 9–12	**World Ladies Championship Salonpas Cup**	Ibaraki	120,000,000	(Japan) Hiromi Mogi (6)
May 17–19	Hokken No Madoguchi Ladies	Fukuoka	120,000,000	(Thailand) Onnarin Sattayabanphot (1)
May 24–26	Chukyo TV Bridgestone Ladies Open	Aichi	70,000,000	(Japan) Rikako Morita (4)
May 31 – Jun 2	Resort Trust Ladies	Hyogo	70,000,000	(Japan) Mamiko Higa (2)
Jun 7–9	Yonex Ladies Golf Tournament	Niigata	60,000,000	(Japan) Junko Omote (3)
Jun 13–16	Suntory Ladies Open	Hyogo	100,000,000	(Japan) Rikako Morita (5)
Jun 21–23	Nichirei Ladies	Chiba	80,000,000	(Japan) Yumiko Yoshida (2)
Jun 27–30	Earth Mondahmin Cup	Chiba	140,000,000	(Japan) Natsuka Hori (2)
Jul 5-7	Nichi-Iko Women's Open Golf Tournament	Toyama	60,000,000	(South Korea) Kim Young (1)
Jul 19–21	Samantha Thavasa Girls Collection Ladies Tournament	Ibaraki	60,000,000	(Japan) Yumiko Yoshida (3)
Aug 9–11	Meiji Cup	Hokkaido	90,000,000	(South Korea) Na Da-ye (1)
Aug 16–18	NEC Karuizawa 72 Golf Tournament	Nagano	70,000,000	(Japan) Misuzu Narita (2)
Aug 23–25	CAT Ladies	Kanagawa	60,000,000	(South Korea) Ahn Sun-ju (12)
Aug 30 – Sep 1	Nitori Ladies Golf Tournament	Hokkaido	100,000,000	(South Korea) Ahn Sun-ju (13)
Sep 6–8	Golf5 Ladies	Hokkaido	60,000,000	(Japan) Yumiko Yoshida (4)
Sep 12–15	**Japan LPGA Championship Konica Minolta Cup**	Hokkaido	140,000,000	(South Korea) Lee Bo-mee (4)
Sep 20–22	Munsingwear Ladies Tokai Classic	Aichi	80,000,000	(Japan) Sakura Yokomine (20)
Sep 27–29	Miyagi TV Cup Dunlop Women's Open Golf Tournament	Miyagi	70,000,000	(South Korea) Lee Na-ri (1)
Oct 3–6	**Japan Women's Open Golf Championship**	Kanagawa	140,000,000	(Japan) Mika Miyazato (2)
Oct 11–13	Stanley Ladies Golf Tournament	Shizuoka	90,000,000	(South Korea) Kang Soo-yun (1)
Oct 18–20	Fujitsu Ladies	Chiba	80,000,000	(South Korea) Lee Na-ri (2)
Oct 24–27	Nobuta Group Masters GC Ladies	Hyogo	140,000,000	(Japan) Sakura Yokomine (21)
Nov 1–3	Hisako Higuchi – Morinaga Weider Ladies	Chiba	70,000,000	(South Korea) Lee Bo-mee (5)
Nov 8–10	Mizuno Classic	Mie	US$1,200,000	(Taiwan) Teresa Lu (1)
Nov 15–17	Ito En Ladies Golf Tournament	Chiba	90,000,000	(Japan) Sakura Yokomine (22)
Nov 21–24	Daio Paper Elleair Ladies Open	Ehime	100,000,000	(Japan) Rikako Morita (6)
Nov 28 – Dec 1	**Japan LPGA Tour Championship Ricoh Cup**	Miyazaki	100,000,000	(Japan) Shiho Oyama (13)

Events in bold are majors.

The Mizuno Classic is co-sanctioned with the LPGA Tour.
