= Porani Chutichai =

Thai professional golfer

Personal information
- Nickname: Wing
- Nationality: Thailand
- Born: 28 November 1985 (age 40) Chiang Rai, Thailand

Career
- Sport: Golf
- Turned professional: 2005
- Former tours: LPGA of Japan Tour; China LPGA Tour
- Professional wins: 8

Number of wins by tour
- LPGA of Japan Tour: 1
- Other: 7

Porani Chutichai (Thai: ภรณีย์ ชุติชัย; born 28 November 1985) is a Thai professional golfer. She has competed on several professional tours in Asia, including the LPGA of Japan Tour and the China LPGA Tour. She is best known for winning the 2016 Yonex Ladies Golf Tournament on the LPGA of Japan Tour. She is currently involved in golf-related roles, including working as a caddie and mentor for younger players.

== Early life and amateur career ==
Chutichai was born on 28 November 1985 in Chiang Rai, Thailand. She began playing golf at the age of 11.

As an amateur, she represented Thailand in international competitions, including the 2002 Asian Games in Busan, South Korea. She finished 13th in the women's individual event and was part of the Thai team that placed fifth in the team event. She also won a gold medal at the National Games and earned silver medals in both individual and team events at the 2004 World University Golf Championship.

== Professional career ==
Chutichai turned professional in 2005. She competed across several Asian tours, including the China LPGA Tour, the Thai LPGA Tour, and the All Thailand Golf Tour.

She won her first professional title in 2007 on the Taiwan LPGA Tour and later recorded three victories on the China LPGA Tour in 2011.

On domestic tours, she won the 2013 Singha Masters on the All Thailand Golf Tour and recorded multiple victories on the Thai LPGA Tour, including the 2009 Cario Thai LPGA Championship and the 2011 1st SAT–Thai LPGA Championship.

She later competed on the LPGA of Japan Tour. In June 2016, she won the Yonex Ladies Golf Tournament in Niigata, securing her first victory on the tour. She was among the early Thai players to compete on the LPGA of Japan Tour, becoming one of the first Thai women to establish a career on the circuit.

Her performances in 2016 earned her a place on Team Thailand for the 2016 International Crown, a team competition sanctioned by the LPGA Tour.

In later years, Chutichai transitioned into roles beyond competitive play. She has worked as a caddie and manager for Thai LPGA Tour player Chanettee Wannasaen.

She has also remained active in the golf industry in Thailand, including coaching, youth development programs, and business ventures related to golf.

== Professional wins (8) ==
=== LPGA of Japan Tour wins (1) ===
No.	Date	Tournament	Winning score	To par	Margin of victory	Runner-up
1	5 Jun 2016	Yonex Ladies Golf Tournament	63–68–75=206	−10	Playoff	(Japan) Momoko Ueda

=== All Thailand Golf Tour wins (1) ===
- 2013 (1) Singha Masters

=== China LPGA Tour wins (3) ===
- 2011 (3) Beijing Renji Challenge, Yangzhou Challenge, Yantai Yangmadao Challenge

=== Thai LPGA Tour wins (2) ===
- 2009 (1) Cario Thai LPGA Championship
- 2011 (1) 1st SAT–Thai LPGA Championship

=== JLPGA Step Up Tour wins (1) ===
- 2018 (1) Route Inn Cup Ueda Maruko Grandvrio Ladies

== Team appearances ==
Amateur

- Asian Games (representing Thailand): 2002
- Queen Sirikit Cup (representing Thailand): 2004

Professional

- International Crown (representing Thailand): 2016
