= Lee Jee-young =

South Korean professional golfer (born 1985)

Jee-Young Lee
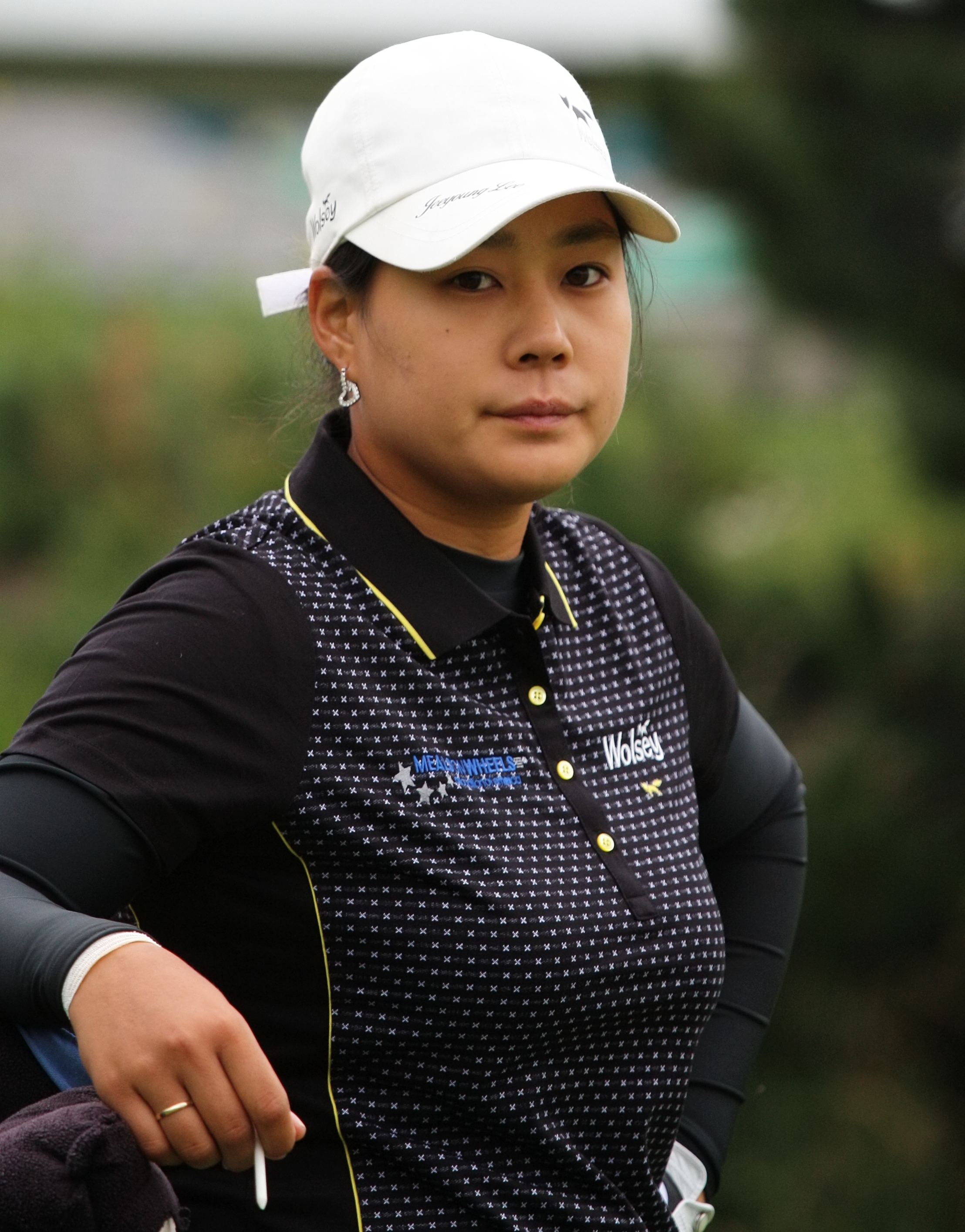
- Lee before 2009 Women's British Open

Personal information
- Nickname: Jelly
- Nationality: South Korea
- Born: 2 December 1985 (age 40) Seoul, South Korea
- Height: 5 ft 6 in (1.68 m)

Career
- Sport: Golf
- College: Yong-In University
- Turned professional: 2004
- Former tours: LPGA Tour (2005–2015); LPGA of Korea Tour (joined 2004)
- Professional wins: 2

Number of wins by tour
- LPGA Tour: 1
- LPGA of Korea Tour: 1

Best results in LPGA major championships
- Chevron Championship: T13: 2007
- Women's PGA C'ship: T10: 2007
- U.S. Women's Open: 7th: 2007
- Women's British Open: T2: 2007
- Evian Championship: CUT: 2014

Lee Jee-young (born 2 December 1985) is a South Korean professional golfer. She played on the LPGA of Korea Tour and on the United States-based LPGA Tour.

== Career ==
Lee was born in Seoul, South Korea. She began playing golf at age 14.

In 2004, Lee turned professional. She played on the LPGA of Korea Tour. In 2005, as a member of the KLPGA, she won the CJ Nine Bridges Classic, while still not yet a member of the LPGA. That same year, she won the TaeYoung Cup on the KLPGA Tour.

== Professional wins (2) ==
=== LPGA Tour (1) ===
No.	Date	Tournament	Winning score	Margin of victory	Runners-up
1	30 Oct 2005	CJ Nine Bridges Classic	−5 (65-73-73=211)	3 stroke	(South Korea) Mi-Hyun Kim (Sweden) Carin Koch

LPGA Tour playoff record (0–1)

No.	Year	Tournament	Opponent	Result
1	2007	Michelob ULTRA Open at Kingsmill	(Norway) Suzann Pettersen	Lost to par on third extra hole

=== LPGA of Korea Tour (1) ===
- 2005 (1) Taeyoung Cup Korea Women's Open

== Results in LPGA majors ==
Results not in chronological order before 2015.

Tournament	2006	2007	2008	2009	2010	2011	2012	2013	2014	2015
ANA Inspiration	T56	T13	T21	20	T40	CUT	CUT	T32	T16	CUT
Women's PGA Championship	T14	T10	T18	T65	CUT	CUT	CUT		CUT	T49
U.S. Women's Open	T10	7	T13	WD	T25	CUT			T38	
Women's British Open	T22	T2	T17	CUT	T62	CUT		T36	T58	
The Evian Championship ^								WD	CUT	

^ The Evian Championship was added as a major in 2013.

Top 10
Did not play

CUT = missed the half-way cut
WD = withdrew
"T" = tied

=== Summary ===
Tournament	Wins	2nd	3rd	Top-5	Top-10	Top-25	Events	Cuts made
ANA Inspiration	0	0	0	0	0	4	10	7
Women's PGA Championship	0	0	0	0	1	3	9	5
U.S. Women's Open	0	0	0	0	2	4	7	5
Women's British Open	0	1	0	1	1	3	8	6
The Evian Championship	0	0	0	0	0	0	2	0
Totals	0	1	0	1	4	14	36	23

- Most consecutive cuts made – 14 (2006 Kraft Nabisco – 2009 LPGA)
- Longest streak of top-10s – 3 (2007 LPGA – 2007 British Open)

== LPGA Tour career summary ==
Year	Tournaments played	Cuts made	Wins	2nd	3rd	Top 10s	Best finish	Earnings ($)	Money list rank	Scoring average	Scoring rank
2005	2	2	1	0	0	1	1	208,482	n/a	72.14	n/a
2006	25	24	0	1	0	6	T2	575,125	20	71.46	18
2007	24	23	0	3	0	10	2	966,256	10	71.66	12
2008	28	25	0	1	1	8	2	795,991	21	71.38	14
2009	25	22	0	0	1	3	T3	358,711	37	71.88	33
2010	20	18	0	1	1	8	T2	589,784	19	71.26	16
2011	15	5	0	0	0	0	T33	22,582	116	73.97	106
2012	13	8	0	0	0	0	T12	68,650	90	72.35	48
2013	21	15	0	0	0	1	T4	172,692	65	72.37	61
2014	18	7	0	0	0	0	T16	74,842	101	73.15	126
2015	13	9	0	0	0	0	T25	75,465	97	71.88	54

- Official as of the 2015 season

== Team appearances ==
Professional

- Lexus Cup (representing Asia team): 2006 (winners), 2007 (winners)
