= Candie Kung =

American professional golfer (born 1981)

Candie Kung 龔怡萍
Personal information
- Full name: Kung I-Ping
- Nationality: Taiwan; United States
- Born: 8 August 1981 (age 45) Kaohsiung, Taiwan
- Height: 5 ft 6 in (1.68 m)

Career
- Sport: Golf
- College: University of Southern California
- Turned professional: 2001
- Former tours: LPGA Tour (joined 2002); Futures Tour (2000–01)
- Professional wins: 5

Number of wins by tour
- LPGA Tour: 4
- Epson Tour: 1

Best results in LPGA major championships
- Chevron Championship: T8: 2004
- Women's PGA C'ship: T10: 2008
- U.S. Women's Open: 2nd: 2009
- Women's British Open: T4: 2002
- Evian Championship: T11: 2015

Candie Kung (Chinese: 龔怡萍; pinyin: Gōng Yípíng; Pe̍h-ōe-jī: Kióng Sîn-phêng; born 8 August 1981) is an American professional golfer who played on the U.S.-based LPGA Tour.

== Amateur career ==
Kung was born in Kaohsiung, Taiwan. She was a three-time American Junior Golf Association (AJGA) All-American and was named 1999 AJGA Player of the Year. She won the 2001 U.S. Women's Amateur Public Links. While at USC, Kung was a two-time NCAA All-American and won the 2000 Pac-10 Championship.

== Professional career ==
After turning pro in 2001, Kung initially played on the second tier Futures Tour, and she won the SBC Futures Tour Championship that year. She tied for 15th at the LPGA Final Qualifying Tournament to win a place on the main tour for 2002. She had a solid rookie season, finishing 36th on the money list. In 2003, she won her first three LPGA events, and was sixth on the money list. She finished 17th on the money list in 2004, tied for 11th in 2005, and 29th in 2006. Kung won her fourth LPGA tournament at the Hana Bank-KOLON Championship in 2008.

Kung came close to winning the 2009 U.S. Women's Open. She finished the tournament at one over 285 and was tied for first till Eun-Hee Ji birdied the final hole to take home the title.

Kung represented Chinese Taipei at the 2016 Summer Olympics, finishing tied for 31.

== Personal information ==
Kung was born in Taiwan and moved to the United States in 1995. She became a naturalized U.S. citizen in approximately 2005. She currently lives in Allen, Texas.

== Professional wins (5) ==
=== LPGA Tour (4) ===
No.	Date	Tournament	Winning score	Margin of victory	Runner(s)-up
1	19 Apr 2003	LPGA Takefuji Classic	−12 (67-67-70=204)	2 strokes	(South Korea) Kang Soo-yun (United States) Cristie Kerr (Sweden) Annika Sörenstam
2	24 Aug 2003	Wachovia LPGA Classic	−14 (71-67-66-70=274)	2 strokes	(United States) Meg Mallon (South Korea) Se Ri Pak
3	31 Aug 2003	State Farm Classic	−14 (64-67-71=202)	1 stroke	(England) Laura Davies
4	2 Nov 2008	Hana Bank-KOLON Championship	−6 (70-71-69=210)	1 stroke	(Australia) Katherine Hull

LPGA Tour playoff record (0–1)

No.	Year	Tournament	Opponent(s)	Result
1	2008	Navistar LPGA Classic	(United States) Cristie Kerr (Mexico) Lorena Ochoa	Ochoa won with par on second extra hole Kerr eliminated by par on first hole

=== Futures Tour (1) ===
- 2001 (1) SBC FUTURES Tour Championship

== Results in LPGA majors ==
Results not in chronological order before 2018.

Tournament	1999	2000	2001	2002	2003	2004	2005	2006	2007	2008	2009
ANA Inspiration			CUT		T28	T8	T9	T24	T60	T21	T30
U.S. Women's Open	CUT				CUT	T5	T6	T28	T58	T19	2
Women's PGA Championship				CUT	CUT	T64	T13	T44		T10	T57
Women's British Open ^				T4	T10	T29	T22	T10	T33	T42	CUT

Tournament	2010	2011	2012	2013	2014	2015	2016	2017	2018
ANA Inspiration	T69	T62	T49	T69	T71	T69	T65	T56	T66
U.S. Women's Open	T28	T13	CUT	WD	T30	T56	CUT	CUT	CUT
Women's PGA Championship	72	T20	29	T44	T48	T34	T72	T20	CUT
Women's British Open	CUT	T14	38	T25	CUT	T36	T31	T49	
The Evian Championship ^^				T52	T50	T11	T14	T32	

^ The Women's British Open replaced the du Maurier Classic as an LPGA major in 2001
^^ The Evian Championship was added as a major in 2013

Top 10
Did not play

CUT = missed the halfway cut
WD = withdrew
"T" = tied

=== Summary ===
Tournament	Wins	2nd	3rd	Top-5	Top-10	Top-25	Events	Cuts made
ANA Inspiration	0	0	0	0	2	4	17	16
U.S. Women's Open	0	1	0	2	3	5	17	10
Women's PGA Championship	0	0	0	0	1	4	16	13
Women's British Open	0	0	0	1	3	6	16	13
The Evian Championship	0	0	0	0	0	2	5	5
Totals	0	1	0	3	9	21	71	57

- Most consecutive cuts made – 23 (2003 British Open – 2009 U.S. Open)
- Longest streak of top-10s – 2 (2003 British Open – 2004 Kraft Nabisco)

== Team appearances ==
Amateur

- Espirito Santo Trophy (representing Chinese Taipei): 2000

Professional

- Lexus Cup (representing Asia team): 2005, 2006 (winners), 2007 (winners), 2008
- International Crown (representing Taiwan/Chinese Taipei): 2014, 2016, 2018
