= 2007 LPGA Championship =

Tournament information
- Dates: June 7–10, 2007
- Location: Havre de Grace, Maryland; 39.542°N 76.133°W
- Course: Bulle Rock Golf Course
- Tour: LPGA Tour
- Format: Stroke play - 72 holes

Statistics
- Par: 72
- Length: 6,596 yards (6,031 m)
- Field: 150 players, 84 after cut
- Cut: 147 (+3)
- Prize fund: $2.0 million
- Winner's share: $300,000

Champion
- (Norway) Suzann Pettersen
- 274 (−14)
- Location in United States Location in Maryland

The 2007 LPGA Championship was played from June 7–10 at Bulle Rock Golf Course in Havre de Grace, Maryland. This was the 53rd edition of the LPGA Championship, the second of four major championships on the LPGA Tour in 2007.

Suzann Pettersen, age 26, won her first major title with 274 (−14), one stroke ahead of runner-up Karrie Webb; it was her second career win on the LPGA Tour.

== Round summaries ==
=== First round ===
Thursday, June 7, 2007

Place	Player	Score	To par
T1	(South Korea) Birdie Kim	67	−5
T1	(Brazil) Angela Park	67	−5
T1	(United States) Kim Saiki	67	−5
T4	(England) Laura Davies	68	−4
T4	(United States) Stacy Prammanasudh	68	−4
T4	(United States) Morgan Pressel	68	−4
T4	(Australia) Karrie Webb	68	−4
T8	(Sweden) Maria Hjorth	69	−3
T8	(United States) Pat Hurst	69	−3
T8	(United States) Brittany Lincicome	69	−3
T8	(Norway) Suzann Pettersen	69	−3
T8	(Italy) Giulia Sergas	69	−3

=== Second round ===
Friday, June 8, 2007

Place	Player	Score	To par
1	(Norway) Suzann Pettersen	69-67=136	−8
2	(Australia) Karrie Webb	68-69=137	−7
T3	(South Korea) Birdie Kim	67-71=138	−6
T3	(United States) Brittany Lincicome	69-69=138	−6
T5	(United States) Paula Creamer	71-68=139	−5
T5	(South Korea) Meena Lee	70-69=139	−5
T5	(United States) Morgan Pressel	68-71=139	−5
T5	(Sweden) Annika Sörenstam	70-69=139	−5
T9	(South Korea) Sarah Lee	71-69=140	−4
T9	(Scotland) Catriona Matthew	71-69=140	−4
T9	(Scotland) Mhairi McKay	71-69=140	−4
T9	(Brazil) Angela Park	67-73=140	−4
T9	(United States) Kim Saiki	67-73=140	−4

=== Third round ===
Saturday, June 9, 2007

Place	Player	Score	To par
1	(South Korea) Min Na-on	71-70-65=206	−10
2	(Norway) Suzann Pettersen	69-67-71=207	−9
T3	(Brazil) Angela Park	67-73-68=208	−8
T3	(Australia) Karrie Webb	68-69-71=208	−8
5	(United States) Morgan Pressel	68-71-70=209	−7
6	(United States) Kim Saiki	67-73-70=210	−6
T7	(United States) Nicole Castrale	70-73-68=211	−5
T7	(South Korea) Birdie Kim	67-71-73=211	−5
T7	(Malaysia) Siew-Ai Lim	72-69-70=211	−5
T7	(United States) Brittany Lincicome	69-69-73=211	−5
T7	(South Korea) Lee Jee-young	71-72-68=211	−5
T7	(Mexico) Lorena Ochoa	71-71-69=211	−5

=== Final round ===
Sunday, June 10, 2007

Place	Player	Score	To par	Money ($)
1	(Norway) Suzann Pettersen	69-67-71-67=274	−14	300,000
2	(Australia) Karrie Webb	68-69-71-67=275	−13	179,038
3	(South Korea) Min Na-on	71-70-65-70=276	−12	129,880
4	(Australia) Lindsey Wright	71-70-71-66=278	−10	100,473
5	(Brazil) Angela Park	67-73-68-71=279	−9	80,869
T6	(United States) Paula Creamer	71-68-73-68=280	−8	53,422
T6	(Sweden) Sophie Gustafson	70-71-71-68=280	−8	53,422
T6	(United States) Brittany Lincicome	69-69-73-69=280	−8	53,422
T6	(Mexico) Lorena Ochoa	71-71-69-69=280	−8	53,422
T10	(United States) Nicole Castrale	70-73-68-70=281	−7	35,730
T10	(South Korea) Lee Jee-young	71-72-68-70=281	−7	35,730
T10	(South Korea) Sarah Lee	71-69-72-69=281	−7	35,730
T10	(Scotland) Catriona Matthew	71-69-74-67=281	−7	35,730

==== Scorecard ====
Final round

Hole	1	2	3	4	5	6	7	8	9	10	11	12	13	14	15	16	17	18
Par	4	5	3	4	4	4	3	5	4	4	5	3	4	4	5	4	3	4
(Norway) Pettersen	−9	−9	−9	−9	−10	−10	−10	−11	−10	−11	−11	−11	−12	−12	−13	−13	−14	−14
(Australia) Webb	−8	−8	−8	−9	−8	−7	−8	−9	−9	−9	−10	−10	−10	−11	−11	−11	−12	−13
(South Korea) Min	−10	−10	−10	−11	−11	−10	−9	−8	−8	−8	−8	−8	−9	−10	−11	−12	−12	−12
(Australia) Wright	−5	−5	−5	−6	−6	−7	−7	−8	−8	−8	−8	−8	−9	−9	−10	−10	−10	−10
(Brazil) Park	−8	−8	−8	−8	−8	−8	−8	−8	−7	−8	−8	−9	−9	−9	−9	−9	−9	−9
(United States) Creamer	−4	−4	−4	−5	−5	−5	−5	−7	−7	−7	−7	−7	−7	−8	−8	−8	−8	−8
(Sweden) Gustafson	−5	−5	−5	−5	−5	−6	−6	−7	−7	−6	−5	−5	−5	−5	−6	−6	−7	−8
(United States) Lincicome	−6	−6	−6	−7	−7	−7	−7	−8	−8	−8	−8	−8	−8	−8	−8	−8	−8	−8
(Mexico) Ochoa	−6	−6	−6	−6	−6	−6	−6	−7	−7	−7	−8	−8	−8	−8	−9	−8	−9	−8

Cumulative tournament scores, relative to par

Eagle	Birdie	Bogey
