= 2015 LPGA of Japan Tour =

The 2015 LPGA of Japan Tour is the 48th season of the LPGA of Japan Tour, the professional golf tour for women operated by the Ladies Professional Golfers' Association of Japan. The 2015 schedule includes 37 official events worth ¥3.4 billion.

Leading money winner was Lee Bo-mee with ¥230,497,057. She also won the Mercedes Ranking, had the lowest scoring average and finished most often (23 times) inside the top-10.

== Schedule ==
The number in parentheses after winners' names show the player's total number wins in official money individual events on the LPGA of Japan Tour, including that event. All tournaments are played in Japan.

Dates	Tournament	Location	Prize fund (¥)	Winner
Mar 6–8	Daikin Orchid Ladies Golf Tournament	Okinawa	100,000,000	(Taiwan) Teresa Lu (5)
Mar 13–15	Yokohama Tire Golf Tournament PRGR Ladies Cup	Kōchi	80,000,000	(South Korea) Lee Ji-hee (18)
Mar 20–22	T-Point Ladies Golf Tournament	Saga	70,000,000	(Japan) Akane Iijima (7)
Mar 27–29	AXA Ladies Golf Tournament in Miyazaki	Miyazaki	80,000,000	(Japan) Ritsuko Ryu (3)
Apr 2–5	Yamaha Ladies Open Katsuragi	Shizuoka	100,000,000	(Japan) Ayaka Watanabe (2)
Apr 10–12	Studio Alice Women's Open	Hyogo	60,000,000	(Japan) Misuzu Narita (6)
Apr 17–19	KKT Cup Vantelin Ladies Open	Kumamoto	100,000,000	(Japan) Erika Kikuchi (1)
Apr 24–26	Fujisankei Ladies Classic	Shizuoka	80,000,000	(Japan) Hikari Fujita (1)
May 1–3	Cyber Agent Ladies Golf Tournament	Chiba	70,000,000	(South Korea) Jiyai Shin (10)
May 7–10	**World Ladies Championship Salonpas Cup**	Ibaraki	120,000,000	(South Korea) Chun In-gee (1)
May 15–17	Hoken no Madoguchi Ladies	Fukuoka	120,000,000	(South Korea) Lee Bo-mee (9)
May 22–24	Chukyo TV Bridgestone Ladies Open	Aichi	70,000,000	(Japan) Yumiko Yoshida (5)
May 29–31	Resort Trust Ladies	Yamanashi	80,000,000	(Taiwan) Teresa Lu (6)
Jun 5–7	Yonex Ladies Golf Tournament	Niigata	60,000,000	(Japan) Shiho Oyama (16)
Jun 11–14	Suntory Ladies Open Golf Tournament	Hyogo	100,000,000	(Japan) Misuzu Narita (7)
Jun 19–21	Nichirei Ladies	Chiba	80,000,000	(South Korea) Jiyai Shin (11)
Jun 25–28	Earth Mondahmin Cup	Chiba	140,000,000	(South Korea) Lee Bo-mee (10)
Jul 17–19	Samantha Thavasa Girls Collection Ladies Tournament	Ibaraki	60,000,000	(Japan) Yoko Maeda (2)
Jul 24–26	Century 21 Ladies Golf Tournament	Shizuoka	60,000,000	(South Korea) Ahn Sun-ju (19)
Jul 31 – Aug 2	Daito Kentaku Eheyanet Ladies	Yamanashi	80,000,000	(Japan) Erina Hara (2)
Aug 7–9	Meiji Cup	Hokkaido	90,000,000	(Japan) Yukari Nishiyama (1)
Aug 14–16	NEC Karuizawa 72 Golf Tournament	Nagano	80,000,000	(Taiwan) Teresa Lu (7)
Aug 21–23	CAT Ladies	Kanagawa	60,000,000	(Japan) Mayu Hattori (5)
Aug 28–30	Nitori Ladies Golf Tournament	Hokkaido	80,000,000	(South Korea) Lee Bo-mee (11)
Sep 4–6	Golf5 Ladies	Gifu	60,000,000	(South Korea) Lee Bo-mee (12)
Sep 10–13	**Japan LPGA Championship Konica Minolta Cup**	Nagasaki	140,000,000	(Taiwan) Teresa Lu (8)
Sep 18–20	Munsingwear Ladies Tokai Classic	Aichi	80,000,000	(South Korea) Kim Ha-neul (1)
Sep 25–27	Miyagi TV Cup Dunlop Women's Open Golf Tournament	Miyagi	70,000,000	(Japan) Junko Omote (4)
Oct 1–4	**Japan Women's Open Golf Championship**	Ishikawa	140,000,000	(South Korea) Chun In-gee (2)
Oct 9–11	Stanley Ladies Golf Tournament	Shizuoka	90,000,000	(South Korea) Lee Bo-mee (13)
Oct 16–18	Fujitsu Ladies	Chiba	80,000,000	(Taiwan) Teresa Lu (9)
Oct 22–25	Nobuta Group Masters GC Ladies	Hyogo	140,000,000	(South Korea) Lee Ji-hee (19)
Oct 30 – Nov 1	Hisako Higuchi – Ponta Ladies	Saitama	70,000,000	(Japan) Ayaka Watanabe (3)
Nov 6–8	Toto Japan Classic	Mie	US$1,500,000	(South Korea) Ahn Sun-ju (20)
Nov 13–15	Ito En Ladies Golf Tournament	Chiba	100,000,000	(South Korea) Lee Bo-mee (14)
Nov 19–22	Daio Paper Elleair Ladies Open	Fukushima	100,000,000	(South Korea) Lee Bo-mee (15)
Nov 26–29	**Japan LPGA Tour Championship Ricoh Cup**	Miyazaki	100,000,000	(South Korea) Jiyai Shin (12)

Events in bold are majors.

The Toto Japan Classic is co-sanctioned with the LPGA Tour.
