= 2003 LPGA Championship =

Tournament information
- Dates: June 5–8, 2003
- Location: Wilmington, Delaware; 39.789°N 75.564°W
- Course: DuPont Country Club
- Tour: LPGA Tour
- Format: Stroke play - 72 holes

Statistics
- Par: 71
- Length: 6,408 yards (5,859 m)
- Field: 144 players, 70 after cut
- Cut: 146 (+4)
- Prize fund: $1.6 million
- Winner's share: $240,000

Champion
- (Sweden) Annika Sörenstam
- 278 (−6), playoff
- Location in United States Location in Delaware

The 2003 LPGA Championship was the 49th LPGA Championship, played June 5–8 at DuPont Country Club in Wilmington, Delaware.

Annika Sörenstam won in a playoff over Grace Park with a par on the first sudden death hole. It was the first of three consecutive LPGA Championships for Sorenstam and the fifth of her ten major titles.

Two weeks earlier, Sörenstam played in a PGA Tour event, the Colonial in Fort Worth, Texas.

The DuPont Country Club hosted this championship for eleven consecutive seasons, from 1994 through 2004.

== Final leaderboard ==
Sunday, June 8, 2003

Place	Player	Score	To par	Money ($)
T1	(Sweden) Annika Sörenstam	70-64-72-72=278	−6	Playoff
T1	(South Korea) Grace Park	69-72-70-67=278	−6	Playoff
T3	(United States) Beth Daniel	71-71-70-72=284	E	85,718
T3	(United States) Rosie Jones	73-68-72-71=284	E	85,718
T3	(Australia) Rachel Teske	69-70-74-71=284	E	85,718
T6	(United States) Kate Golden	72-70-68-75=285	+1	41,873
T6	(South Korea) Young Kim	70-73-72-70=285	+1	41,873
T6	(Australia) Joanne Mills	68-73-75-69=285	+1	41,873
T6	(Wales) Becky Morgan	73-70-70-72=285	+1	41,873
T6	(South Korea) Young-A Yang	73-74-69-69=285	+1	41,873

=== Playoff ===
The sudden-death playoff began on the par-4 18th hole, where Park missed the green, chipped from the heavy rough to 12 feet (4 m) but failed to save par. Sörenstam had a 20-foot (6 m) for birdie, then tapped in for par to win.

Place	Player	Score	To par	Money ($)
1	(Sweden) Annika Sörenstam	4	E	240,000
2	(South Korea) Grace Park	5	+1	147,934

- Sudden-death playoff played on hole 18.
