= 2007 Lexus Cup =

Women's golf international event

- Dates: 7–9 December 2007
- Venue: The Vines Resort & Country Club
- Location: Perth, Australia
- Captains: Se Ri Pak (Asia); Annika Sörenstam (International)
Asia	15	9	International
- Asia wins the Lexus Cup

The 2007 Lexus Cup was a golf event competed by women representing Asia and an International squad representing the rest of the world. Each team was made up of twelve members. The competition took place at The Vines Resort & Country Club in Perth, Australia from 7–9 December 2007. Lexus was the title sponsor; Rolex, DBS, Singapore Airlines and Singapore Sports Council were main sponsors.

After taking a commanding lead in the first day of play, winning all six matches, Team Asia won the tournament by a score of 15 to 9.

== Teams ==
As in the similar team events of the Solheim Cup (USA vs. Europe women), Ryder Cup (USA vs. Europe men), and Presidents Cup (USA vs. "International" men, i.e. rest of the world excluding Europe), each team was made up of twelve players.

Asia

- Rolex World Ranking Qualification
  - Se Ri Pak (captain) – Daejeon, South Korea
  - Jeong Jang – Daejeon, South Korea
  - Jee Young Lee – Seoul, South Korea
  - Jiyai Shin – South Korea
- ADT Official Money List Qualification
  - Shi Hyun Ahn – Seoul, South Korea
  - In-Kyung Kim – South Korea
  - Sarah Lee – Seoul, South Korea
  - Seon Hwa Lee – Cheonan, South Korea
- Captain's Picks
  - Meena Lee – Jeonju, South Korea
  - Amy Hung – Kaohsiung, Taiwan
- Sponsor's Picks
  - Candie Kung – Kaohsiung, Taiwan
  - Ayako Uehara – Kagoshima, Japan

International

- Rolex World Rankings Qualifications
  - Annika Sörenstam (captain) – Stockholm, Sweden
  - (United States) Cristie Kerr – Scottsdale, Arizona
  - Suzann Pettersen – Oslo, Norway
  - (United States) Morgan Pressel – Boca Raton, Florida
- ADT Official Money List Qualification
  - (United States) Natalie Gulbis – Sacramento, California
  - Maria Hjorth – Falun, Sweden
  - (United States) Brittany Lincicome – St. Petersburg, Florida
  - Angela Park – Foz do Iguaçu, Brazil
- Captain's Picks
  - Nikki Campbell – Coventry, Australia
  - (United States) Stacy Prammanasudh – Enid, Oklahoma
- Sponsor's Picks
  - (United States) Nicole Castrale – Palm Desert, California
  - Catriona Matthew – Edinburgh, Scotland

== Day one ==
7 December 2007

Day one saw six foursome matches with each team putting two golfers on the course for each match, with the pairs playing alternate shots. Team Asia took a commanding lead in the Lexus Cup, winning all six matches. Only one of the six matches—Sarah Lee and Meena Lee vs. Cristie Kerr and Nicole Castrale went to 18 holes.

Team Asia	Results	Team International
Jee Young Lee / Seon Hwa Lee	Asia 3&1	Natalie Gulbis / Suzann Pettersen
Sarah Lee / Meena Lee	Asia 1 up	Cristie Kerr / Nicole Castrale
Jeong Jang / Shi Hyun Ahn	Asia 2&1	Angela Park / Nikki Campbell
Se Ri Pak / In-Kyung Kim	Asia 2&1	Morgan Pressel / Stacy Prammanasudh
Amy Hung / Jiyai Shin	Asia 4&2	Maria Hjorth / Brittany Lincicome
Candie Kung / Ayako Uehara	Asia 3&2	Annika Sörenstam / Catriona Matthew
6	Foursomes	0
6	Overall	0

== Day two ==
8 December 2007

The teams competed in four ball competition on day two. Team Asia continued to dominate, increasing its lead to seven points. Team International posted its first points of the week with wins by partners Angela Park and Nikki Campbell, and by Cristie Kerr and Nicole Castrale.

Team Asia	Results	Team International
Jeong Jang / Shi Hyun Ahn	Int'l 3&2	Angela Park / Nikki Campbell
Jee Young Lee / Seon Hwa Lee	Asia 2 up	Natalie Gulbis / Suzann Pettersen
Sarah Lee / Meena Lee	Int'l 3&2	Cristie Kerr / Nicole Castrale
Candie Kung / Ayako Uehara	Halved	Stacy Prammanasudh / Morgan Pressel
Amy Hung / Jiyai Shin	Asia 2&1	Maria Hjorth / Brittany Lincicome
Se Ri Pak / In-Kyung Kim	Asia 1 up	Annika Sörenstam / Catriona Matthew
3 1/2	Four balls	2 1/2
9 1/2	Overall	2 1/2

== Day three ==
9 December 2007

Prior to the start of Day Three, it was announced that Suzann Pettersen had withdrawn from the singles matches due to a back injury. Pak, who had been battling a shoulder injury also sat out and the two captains agreed to halve the Pak-Pettersen match.

Team Asia	Results	Team International
Candie Kung	Int'l 4&3	Annika Sörenstam
Jee Young Lee	Asia 2&1	Nicole Castrale
Amy Hung	Int'l 3&1	Angela Park
In-Kyung Kim	Asia 2&1	Stacy Prammanasudh
Seon Hwa Lee	Asia 3&2	Cristie Kerr
Sarah Lee	Asia 3&2	Nikki Campbell
Shi Hyun Ahn	Int'l 3&2	Maria Hjorth
Ayako Uehara	Halved	Catriona Matthew
Jeong Jang	Int'l 2&1	Morgan Pressel
Meena Lee	Int'l 1 up	Brittany Lincicome
Jiyai Shin	Halved	Natalie Gulbis
Se Ri Pak	Halved	Suzann Pettersen
5 1/2	Singles	6 1/2
15	Overall	9
