= Kim Joo-mi =

South Korean professional golfer (born 1984)

Kim Joo-Mi 김주미
Personal information
- Nationality: South Korea
- Born: 16 July 1984 (age 42) Seoul, South Korea
- Height: 5 ft 4 in (1.63 m)

Career
- Sport: Golf
- College: Choo Ang University
- Turned professional: 2002
- Former tours: LPGA Tour; LPGA of Korea Tour
- Professional wins: 4

Number of wins by tour
- LPGA Tour: 1
- LPGA of Korea Tour: 3

Best results in LPGA major championships
- Chevron Championship: T40: 2009
- Women's PGA C'ship: T46: 2007
- U.S. Women's Open: T14: 2007
- Women's British Open: T10: 2006
Medal record
Asian Games
Gold medal – first place	2002 Busan	Women's team
Silver medal – second place	2002 Busan	Individual

Kim Joo-Mi (Korean: 김주미; born 16 July 1984), also known as Joo Mi Kim, is a South Korean professional golfer.

== Biography ==
Kim was born in Seoul, South Korea. She attended Choo Ang University and turned professional in 2002.

Kim won two tournaments on the LPGA of Korea Tour in 2003 and a third in 2004. In the latter year she finished 12th at the LPGA Final Qualifying Tournament to earn a place on the U.S.-based LPGA Tour in 2005. Her first win on the LPGA Tour came at the first official money event of the 2006 season, the SBS Open at Turtle Bay.

== Professional wins (4) ==
=== LPGA of Korea Tour wins (3) ===
- 2003 Hansol Ladies Open, Woori Jeung Kwan Classic
- 2004 Hansol Ladies Open

=== LPGA Tour wins (1) ===
No.	Date	Tournament	Winning score	Margin of victory	Runners-up
1	18 Feb 2006	SBS Open at Turtle Bay	−10 (70-65-71=206)	Playoff	(South Korea) Soo Young Moon (Mexico) Lorena Ochoa

LPGA Tour playoff record (1–0)

No.	Year	Tournament	Opponents	Result
1	2006	SBS Open at Turtle Bay	(South Korea) Soo Young Moon (Mexico) Lorena Ochoa	Won with birdie on second extra hole Ochoa eliminated by birdie on first hole

== Team appearances ==
Amateur

- Espirito Santo Trophy (representing South Korea): 2000, 2002

Professional

- Lexus Cup (representing Asia team): 2006 (winners)
