= Min Na-on =

South Korean golfer

Min Na-on 민나온
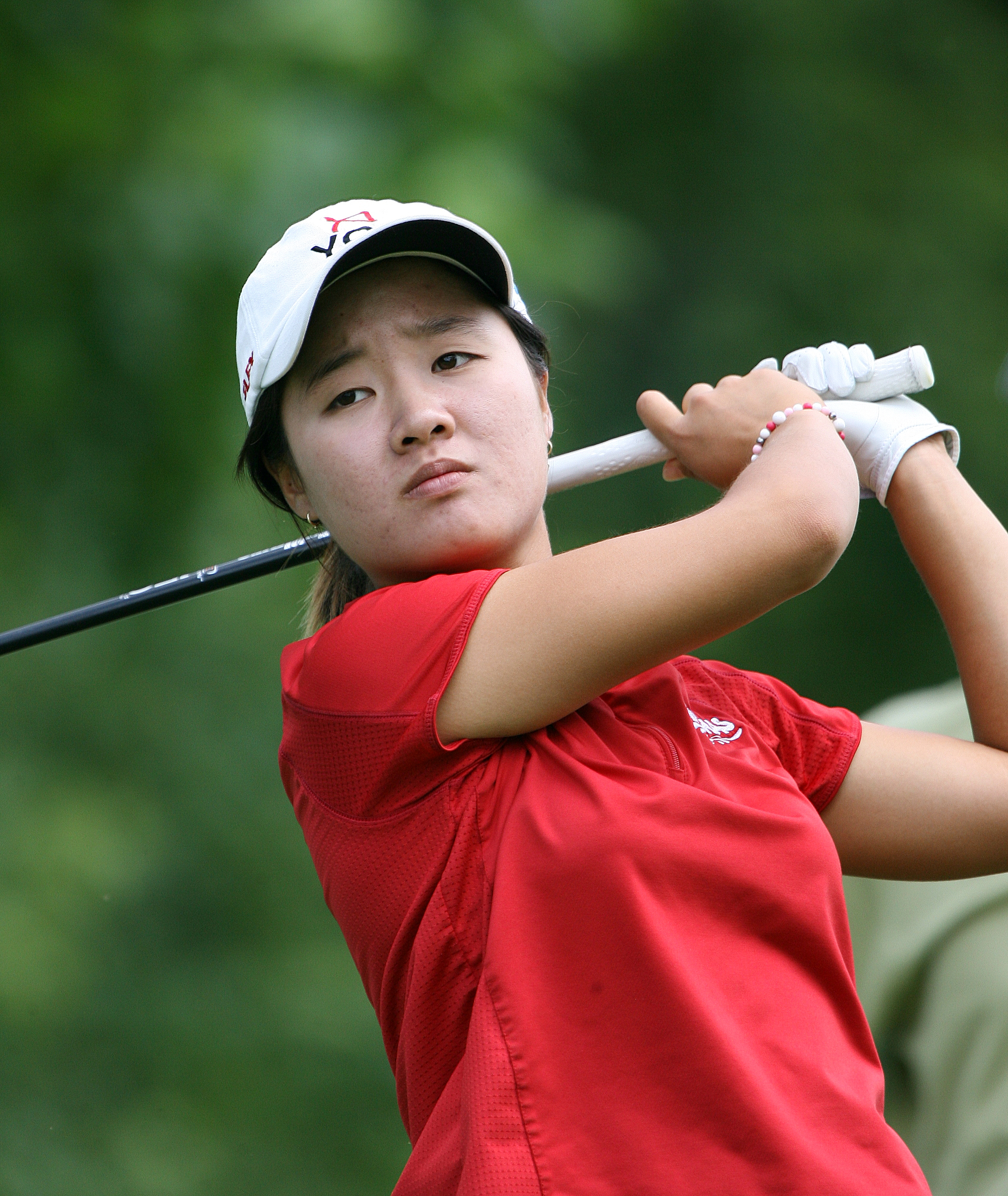
- Min at the 2007 LPGA Championship

Personal information
- Nationality: South Korea
- Born: 5 November 1988 (age 37) South Korea
- Height: 5 ft 4 in (1.63 m)

Career
- Sport: Golf
- Turned professional: 2007
- Former tour: LPGA Tour (joined 2007)

Best results in LPGA major championships
- Chevron Championship: T27: 2010
- Women's PGA C'ship: 3rd: 2007
- U.S. Women's Open: T42: 2008
- Women's British Open: T11: 2007

Min Na-on (Korean: 민나온, born 5 November 1988) is a South Korean professional golfer who has played on the LPGA Tour.

Min won the Sun City Nedbank Challenge as an amateur in 2002 and turned professional after earning non-exempt status on the LPGA Tour at the 2006 LPGA Final Qualifying Tournament. Her highest finish was third place in the 2007 LPGA Championship, a major championship on the Tour.

== Results in LPGA majors ==
Tournament	2007	2008	2009	2010	2011	2012
Kraft Nabisco Championship		CUT		T27	CUT	CUT
LPGA Championship	3	CUT		T19	CUT	CUT
U.S. Women's Open		T42		T52	CUT	
Women's British Open	T11	CUT		CUT		

Top 10
Did not play

CUT = missed the half-way cut
"T" = tied

== LPGA Tour career summary ==
Year	Tournaments played	Cuts made	Wins	2nds	3rds	Top 10s	Best finish	Earnings ($)	Money list rank	Scoring average
2007	19	13	0	0	1	2	3	309,886	40	73.09
2008	26	15	0	0	0	0	T16	146,643	76	73.19
2009	7	4	0	0	0	0	T11	41,703	116	73.29
2010	20	16	0	0	0	1	T8	172,929.50	55	72.46
2011	13	5	0	0	0	0	T31	41,556	99	74.29
2012	15	2	0	0	0	0	T26	15,933	136	74.64

- Official as of the 2012 season. Sources:
