= Ahn Shi-hyun =

South Korean professional golfer (born 1984)

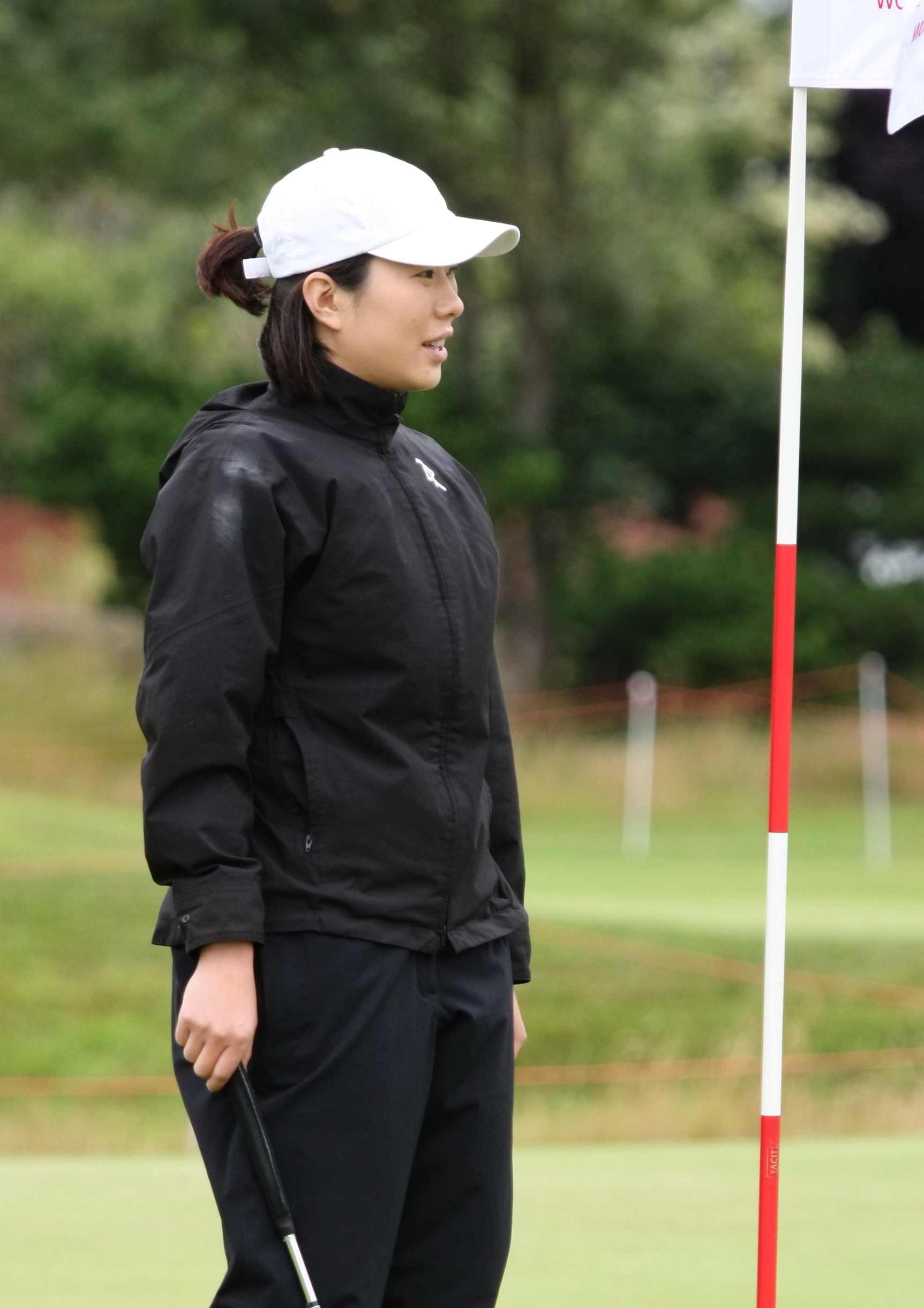
- Ahn before 2009 Women's British Open

Personal information
- Nickname: Cinderella
- Nationality: South Korea
- Born: 15 September 1984 (age 42) Seoul, South Korea
- Height: 5 ft 8 in (1.73 m)
- Spouse: Marcos Lee (2011–2013)

Career
- Sport: Golf
- Turned professional: 2002
- Former tours: LPGA Tour (joined 2004); LPGA of Korea Tour
- Professional wins: 3

Number of wins by tour
- LPGA Tour: 1
- LPGA of Korea Tour: 3

Best results in LPGA major championships
- Chevron Championship: T5: 2007
- Women's PGA C'ship: 2nd: 2004
- U.S. Women's Open: T8: 2006
- Women's British Open: T17: 2008
- Evian Championship: T67: 2019

Achievements and awards
- LPGA Rookie of the Year: 2004

- Ahn Shi-hyun
- Hangul: 안시현
- Hanja: 安是眩
- RR: An Sihyeon
- MR: An Sihyŏn

Ahn Shi-hyun, or Shi Hyun Ahn (Korean: 안시현; 15 September 1984) is a South Korean professional golfer.

== Pro golf career ==
Ahn turned professional in 2002 and that year she topped the order of merit on the Apache Dream Tour (the KLPGA's developmental tour) after winning three times. In 2003, she won the CJ Nine Bridges Classic, an LPGA Tour sanctioned event in her home country. At 19 years, 1 month and 18 days she was the youngest non-American winner in the tour's history. She also finished fourth on the LPGA of Korea Tour money list. In 2004, she was the Rookie of the Year on the U.S. based LPGA Tour, after finishing in sole second place in the LPGA Championship, which is one of the four LPGA majors and finishing sixteenth on the money list. She also won the MBC-Xcanvas Open on the LPGA of Korea Tour that year. In 2005, she finished 36th on the LPGA Tour money list.

During her second round of play at the 2009 LPGA Championship, Ahn struck and killed a robin with her tee shot on the 9th hole.

While playing in the 2010 CN Canadian Women's Open, Ahn and fellow South Korean golfer Il Mi Chung were accused of taking part in a rules violation cover-up after they each accidentally hit the other's golf ball on the 18th hole during the first round of play. Chung and Ahn were disqualified after the round. The LPGA launched an investigation into what took place. A tour official said "One thing that is clear is that both players called the penalty on themselves and as a result, both players were disqualified. They admitted their mistake and accepted the penalty, so the Rules of Golf were adhered to."

== Personal life ==
Ahn was born in Incheon and attended Inmyung Girls High School there. She married actor Marcos Lee in 2011. They have one daughter, Grace (born 2012), but divorced in 2013.

== Professional wins (3) ==
=== LPGA Tour wins (1) ===
| No. | Date | Tournament | Winning score | Margin of victory | Runners-up |
|---|---|---|---|---|---|
| 1 | 2 Nov 2003 | CJ Nine Bridges Classic | −12 (65-71-68=204) | 3 strokes | (England) Laura Davies (South Korea) Se Ri Pak (South Korea) Gloria Park (South Korea) Grace Park |

=== LPGA of Korea Tour wins (3) ===
- 2003 CJ Nine Bridges Classic
- 2004 MBC-Xcanvas Open
- 2016 Kia Motors Korea Women's Open Championship

== Results in LPGA majors ==
Results not in chronological order before 2019.

| Tournament | 2004 | 2005 | 2006 | 2007 | 2008 | 2009 | 2010 | 2011 | 2012 | 2013 | 2014 | 2015 | 2016 | 2017 | 2018 | 2019 |
|---|---|---|---|---|---|---|---|---|---|---|---|---|---|---|---|---|
| ANA Inspiration | CUT | T19 | T8 | T5 | T42 | T56 | T56 | T57 | | | | | | | | |
| U.S. Women's Open | T29 | CUT | T8 | T39 | T64 | | T19 | CUT | | | | | | | | |
| Women's PGA Championship | 2 | T25 | T5 | T21 | T6 | T16 | T34 | CUT | | | | | | | | |
| The Evian Championship ^ | | | | | | | | | | | | | | | | T67 |
| Women's British Open | CUT | T28 | T25 | CUT | T17 | CUT | | | | | | | | | | |

^ The Evian Championship was added as a major in 2013

Top 10
Did not play

CUT = missed the half-way cut
"T" = tied

=== Summary ===
| Tournament | Wins | 2nd | 3rd | Top-5 | Top-10 | Top-25 | Events | Cuts made |
|---|---|---|---|---|---|---|---|---|
| ANA Inspiration | 0 | 0 | 0 | 1 | 2 | 3 | 8 | 7 |
| U.S. Women's Open | 0 | 0 | 0 | 0 | 1 | 2 | 7 | 5 |
| Women's PGA Championship | 0 | 1 | 0 | 2 | 3 | 6 | 8 | 7 |
| Evian Championship | 0 | 0 | 0 | 0 | 0 | 0 | 1 | 1 |
| Women's British Open | 0 | 0 | 0 | 0 | 0 | 2 | 6 | 3 |
| Totals | 0 | 1 | 0 | 3 | 6 | 13 | 30 | 23 |

- Most consecutive cuts made – 8 (2005 British Open – 2007 U.S. Open)
- Longest streak of top-10s – 3 (2006 Kraft Nabisco Championship – 2006 U.S. Open)

== Team appearances ==
Amateur

- Espirito Santo Trophy (representing South Korea): 2000

Professional

- Lexus Cup (representing Asia team): 2006 (winners), 2007 (winners)
