= Angela Park =

Brazilian-American professional golfer (born 1988)

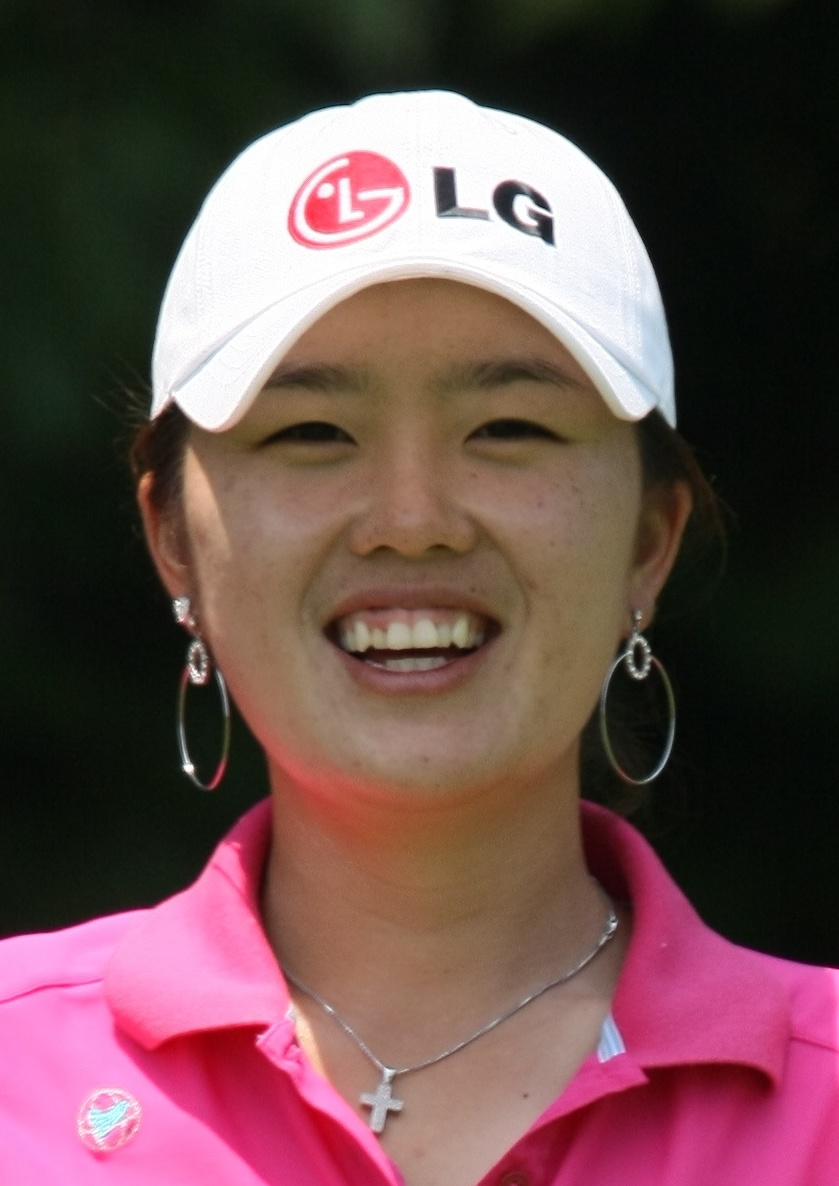
- Park in 2009

Personal information
- Full name: Angela Park
- Nationality: Brazil (before 2008); United States (after 2008)
- Born: August 25, 1988 (age 38) Foz do Iguaçu, Paraná, Brazil
- Height: 5 ft 5 in (1.65 m)

Career
- Sport: Golf
- College: None
- Turned professional: 2006
- Former tours: Futures Tour (joined 2006); LPGA Tour (joined 2007)

Best results in LPGA major championships
- Chevron Championship: T15: 2006
- Women's PGA C'ship: 5th: 2007
- U.S. Women's Open: T2: 2007
- Women's British Open: T34: 2008

Achievements and awards
- LPGA Tour Rookie of the Year: 2007

- Angela Park
- Hangul: 박혜인
- RR: Bak Hyein
- MR: Pak Hyein

Angela Park (Korean: 박혜인, born August 25, 1988) is a Brazilian-American professional golfer who played on the LPGA Tour. She holds dual citizenship in Brazil and the United States.

== Early life ==
In 1988, Park was born in Foz do Iguaçu, Paraná, Brazil. She was born to South Korean-born parents who had a business in Brazil. At the age of 8, she moved with her father and siblings to Torrance, California and spent the remainder of her childhood there where she attended Torrance High School. She states she has only been to Korea on holiday.

== Amateur career ==
Park was successful in the American Junior Golf Association, winning five times. In 29 events in four seasons, she posted 24 top-10 finishes. She was also part of the Canon Cup and the USA Junior Solheim Cup. In 2005, she reached the semi-finals of the U.S. Women's Amateur, the premier amateur tournament for women golfers in the world.

== Professional career ==
Deciding to forgo college, Park turned professional at the age of 17 in April 2006, competing on the Futures Tour, where she entered sixteen events. She earned full playing privileges on the LPGA for 2007 at the December 2006 LPGA Qualifying Tournament. She was named LPGA Tour Rookie of the Year for 2007. Her best finish on the LPGA tour was a tie for runner-up as a rookie at the U.S. Women's Openwhere she led after two rounds.

In October 2010, Park quit professional golf at age 22, claiming she was both mentally and physically exhausted although she has not ruled out the possibility of playing again.

== Personal life ==
In June 2008, Park became a United States citizen. She also retains her Brazilian citizenship.

== Awards and honors ==
In 2007, Park earned LPGA Tour Rookie of the Year honors.

== Results in LPGA majors ==
Tournament	2005	2006	2007	2008	2009	2010
Kraft Nabisco Championship		T15 LA	T26	T21	T48	CUT
LPGA Championship			5	70	WD	
U.S. Women's Open	CUT		T2	T3	CUT	
Women's British Open			CUT	T34		

Top 10
Did not play

LA = Low amateur
CUT = missed the half-way cut
WD = withdrew
"T" = tied

=== Summary ===
- Starts – 14
- Wins – 0
- 2nd-place finishes – 1
- 3rd-place finishes – 1
- Top 3 finishes – 2
- Top 5 finishes – 3
- Top 10 finishes – 3
- Top 25 finishes – 5
- Missed cuts – 4
- Most consecutive cuts made – 5
- Longest streak of top-10s – 2

== LPGA Tour career summary ==
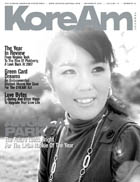
On the December 2007 cover of KoreAm

Year	Tournaments played	Cuts made	Wins	2nds	3rds	Top 10s	Best finish	Earnings ($)	Money list rank	Scoring average	Scoring rank
2005	1	0	0	0	0	0	MC	n/a	n/a	76.50	n/a
2006	1	1	0	0	0	0	T15	n/a	n/a	72.50	n/a
2007	29	27	0	1	3	8	T2	983,922	8	71.54	9
2008	28	25	0	1	1	7	T2	869,918	17	71.99	37
2009	17	8	0	0	2	3	T3	253,391	53	73.71	117
2010	10	2	0	0	0	0	T51	8,976	131	77.25	142

== Team appearances ==
Professional

- Lexus Cup (representing International team): 2007
- World Cup (representing Brazil): 2008
