= Kim Young =

South Korean golfer

Young Kim 김영
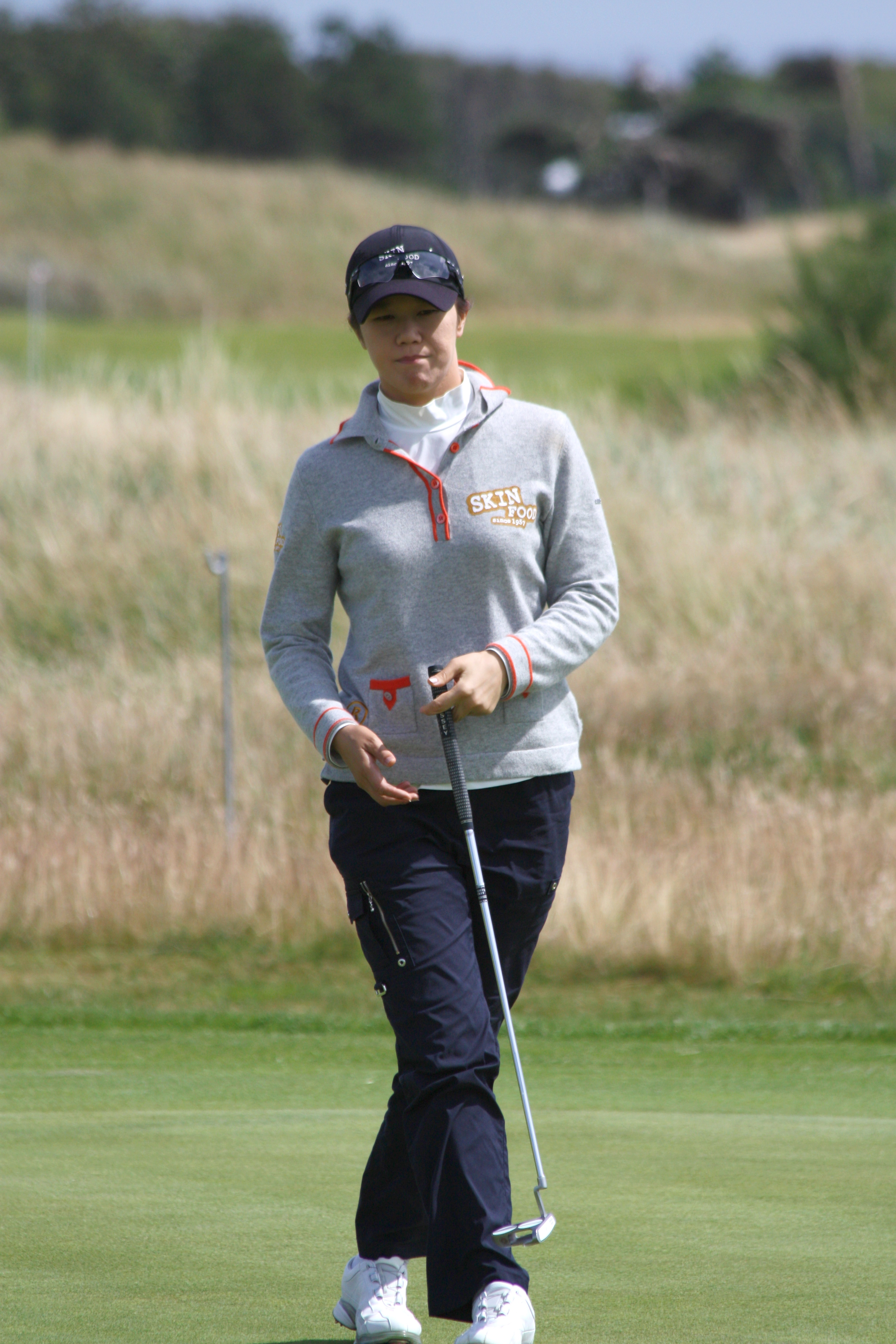
- Kim at the 2009 Women's British Open

Personal information
- Nationality: South Korea
- Born: 2 February 1980 (age 46) Chunchon, South Korea

Career
- Sport: Golf
- College: Kyung Hee University
- Turned professional: 1998
- Former tours: LPGA of Korea Tour; Futures Tour; LPGA Tour (2003–2009)
- Professional wins: 8

Number of wins by tour
- LPGA Tour: 1
- LPGA of Japan Tour: 1
- LPGA of Korea Tour: 5
- Epson Tour: 1

Best results in LPGA major championships
- Chevron Championship: T16: 2004
- Women's PGA C'ship: T6: 2003
- U.S. Women's Open: T10: 2006
- Women's British Open: T3: 2005

Young Kim (Korean: 김영; born 2 February 1980) is a South Korean professional golfer.

Kim was born in Chunchon, South Korea. She played on the LPGA of Korea Tour winning five times between 1999 and 2003. She won once on the Futures Tour in 2001. She played on the LPGA Tour from 2003 to 2009, winning the 2007 LPGA Corning Classic.

Kim's best ever finish in a major championship was a T3 at the 2005 Women's British Open.

Kim was second to Lorena Ochoa for Rookie of the Year in 2003. She is perhaps best known for her different hat wear. Kim, when asked to describe the headgear she was wearing, called it a 'bucket hat'.

== Professional wins (8) ==
=== LPGA Tour wins (1) ===
No.	Date	Tournament	Winning score	Margin of victory	Runners-up
1	27 May 2007	LPGA Corning Classic	−20 (68-64-68-68=268)	3 strokes	(United States) Paula Creamer (South Korea) Mi-Hyun Kim

=== Futures Tour wins (1) ===
- 2001 Barona Creek Women's Golf Classic

=== LPGA of Korea Tour wins (5) ===
- 1999 Korea Women's Open
- 2002 Paradise Ladies Open, SBS Super Tournament
- 2003 KLPGA Championship, SBS Super Tournament

=== LPGA of Japan Tour wins (1) ===
- 2013 Nichi-Iko Women's Open Golf Tournament

== Results in LPGA majors ==
Tournament	2003	2004	2005	2006	2007	2008	2009
Kraft Nabisco Championship		T16	T19	T19	T49	CUT	T30
LPGA Championship	T6	T30	T7	T9	WD	T34	T31
U.S. Women's Open		T20	T38	T10	T25	T31	T40
Women's British Open	9	CUT	T3	CUT	CUT	WD	T59

Top 10
Did not play

WD = withdrew
CUT = missed the halfway cut
"T" = tied

=== Summary ===
- Starts – 26
- Wins – 0
- 2nd-place finishes – 0
- 3rd-place finishes – 1
- Top 3 finishes – 1
- Top 5 finishes – 1
- Top 10 finishes – 6
- Top 25 finishes – 11
- Missed cuts – 4
- Most consecutive cuts made – 7
- Longest streak of top-10s – 2 (twice)

== Team appearances ==
Professional

- Lexus Cup (representing Asia team): 2006 (winners)
- World Cup (representing South Korea): 2007
