= Yim Sung-ah =

South Korean professional golfer (born 1984)

Yim Sung-Ah 임성아 任晟娥
Personal information
- Nationality: South Korea
- Born: 20 March 1984 (age 42) Seoul, South Korea
- Height: 5 ft 4 in (1.63 m)

Career
- Sport: Golf
- College: Yonsei University
- Turned professional: 2002
- Former tours: LPGA of Korea Tour; LPGA Tour (2005-2009); Futures Tour
- Professional wins: 1

Number of wins by tour
- LPGA Tour: 1

Best results in LPGA major championships
- Chevron Championship: T56: 2006
- Women's PGA C'ship: T9: 2006
- U.S. Women's Open: T50: 2007
- Women's British Open: T64: 2005
Medal record
Asian Games
Gold medal – first place	2002 Busan	Women's team

Yim Sung-ah (Korean: 임성아; Hanja: 任晟娥; born 20 March 1984) is a South Korean professional golfer.

== Pre-LPGA Tour days ==
Yim was born in Seoul. She attended Yonsei University and turned professional in November 2002 while still a student. She was a member of the Korean team that won a gold medal at the 2002 Asian Games.

Yim played on the LPGA of Korea Tour in 2003. Like many other South Korean women golfers, she soon began to play primarily in the United States, joining the second tier Futures Tour in 2004.

== LPGA Tour career and beyond ==
In 2005, Yim began playing on the LPGA Tour. In April 2006, she won the Florida's Natural Charity Championship. Paired with Annika Sörenstam for the final round, Yim kept pace with the #1 ranked woman golfer in the world. On the 71st hole with both golfers tied for the lead, Sörenstam hit her tee shot out of bounds resulting in a double bogey. Yim went on to win the tournament by two shots.

Yim only had limited LPGA Tour success after her one win. In 2010, she returned to South Korea to play the LPGA of Korea Tour.

== LPGA Tour wins (1) ==
No.	Date	Tournament	Winning score	Margin of victory	Runners-up
1	23 Apr 2006	Florida's Natural Charity Championship	−16 (68-64-68-72=272)	2 strokes	(United States) Cristie Kerr (Sweden) Annika Sörenstam (Australia) Karrie Webb

== Results in LPGA majors ==
Tournament	2005	2006	2007	2008	2009
Kraft Nabisco Championship		T56	CUT	71	CUT
LPGA Championship	T54	T9	T76	CUT	CUT
U.S. Women's Open		T64	T50		
Women's British Open	T64		CUT		

Top 10
Did not play

CUT = missed the half-way cut
"T" = tied

== Team appearances ==
Amateur

- Espirito Santo Trophy (representing South Korea): 2002
