= Amy Hung =

Taiwanese golfer

Amy Hung 洪沁慧
Personal information
- Nationality: Taiwan
- Born: 7 March 1980 (age 46) Kaohsiung, Taiwan
- Height: 5 ft 7 in (1.70 m)

Career
- Sport: Golf
- College: Taiwan Physical Education College
- Turned professional: 2003
- Current tour: LPGA Tour (joined 2004)

Best results in LPGA major championships
- Chevron Championship: CUT: 2007, 2008, 2010, 2011, 2012
- Women's PGA C'ship: T14: 2011
- U.S. Women's Open: T16: 2007
- Women's British Open: T30: 2011
- Evian Championship: DNP

Amy Hung (Chinese: 洪沁慧; pinyin: Hóng Qìnhuì; Wade-Giles: Hung Chih-Huei; born 7 March 1980) is a professional golfer on the LPGA Tour.

== Amateur wins ==
- 1992 Junior World Golf Championships (11-12 age group)
- 1993 Greg Norman Junior Masters
- 1994 Greg Norman Junior Masters
- 2003 Republic of China Ladies Open (amateur division)

== Professional career ==
Hung turned professional in October 2003 after finishing tied for 42nd at the LPGA Qualifying Tournament, earning non-exempt status for the 2004 season. She returned to the tournament in 2004 and finished tied for 12th to earn exempt status for 2005.

Her best finish to date on the LPGA Tour is a tie for fifth at the 2007 HSBC Women's World Match Play Championship.

On 20 January 2008, Jennifer Rosales and Dorothy Delasin of team Philippines won the 4th Women's World Cup of Golf in Sun City, South Africa. Hung and Yun-Jye Wei of team Taiwan tied for third with team Japan.

== Team appearances ==
Professional

- World Cup (representing Taiwan): 2006, 2007, 2008
- Lexus Cup (representing Asia team): 2007 (winners)
