= Rikako Morita =

Japanese professional golfer

Personal information
- Nationality: Japan
- Born: 8 January 1990 (age 36) Kyoto, Japan
- Height: 1.64 m (5 ft 5 in)

Career
- Sport: Golf
- Turned professional: 2008
- Current tour: LPGA of Japan Tour
- Professional wins: 7

Number of wins by tour
- LPGA of Japan Tour: 7

Best results in LPGA major championships
- Chevron Championship: DNP
- Women's PGA C'ship: DNP
- U.S. Women's Open: T35: 2014
- Women's British Open: T27: 2014
- Evian Championship: DNP

Achievements and awards
- LPGA of Japan Tour leading money winner: 2013

Rikako Morita (森田 理香子, Morita Rikako; born 8 January 1990) is a Japanese professional golfer.

Morita plays on the LPGA of Japan Tour where she has won seven times. She won topped the tour's money list in 2013.

== Professional wins ==
=== LPGA of Japan Tour wins (7) ===
No.	Date	Tournament	Winning score	To par	Margin of victory	Runner-up
1	31 Oct 2010	Hisako Higuchi IDC Otsuka Kagu Ladies	71-62=133	−11	4 strokes	(Japan) Chie Arimura (Australia) Tamie Durdin
2	23 Sep 2012	Miyagi TV Cup Dunlop Women's Open	71-64-67=202	−14	2 strokes	(Japan) Hiromi Mogi
3	10 Mar 2013	Daikin Orchid Ladies	68-67-68=203	−13	Playoff	(Japan) Sakura Yokomine
4	26 May 2013	Chukyo TV Bridgestone Ladies Open	67-67-74=208	−8	1 stroke	(South Korea) Jeon Mi-jeong
5	16 Jun 2013	Suntory Ladies Open	73-66-72-67=278	−10	1 stroke	(Japan) Mamiko Higa (Japan) Yumiko Yoshida (South Korea) Kumiko Kaneda
6	24 Nov 2013	Daio Paper Elleair Ladies Open	70-70-64-69=273	−15	1 stroke	(Japan) Asako Fujimoto
7	23 Mar 2014	T-Point Ladies	69-68-71=208	−8	4 strokes	(Japan) Erina Hara

== Team appearances ==
Amateur

- Espirito Santo Trophy (representing Japan): 2006
