= Lexus Cup =

Golf tournament formerly on the LPGA Tour

The Lexus Cup was an annual golf tournament played between 2005 and 2008 for professional women golfers contested by a team representing Asia and an international team representing the rest of the world. It was sanctioned by the LPGA Tour, but any winnings were unofficial and were not included in the LPGA money list standings.

The title sponsor was Lexus, a luxury automobile maker. It was one many new team golf tournaments founded on the model of the Ryder Cup since that tournament became a star attraction in golf in the 1980s. In women's golf it complemented the Solheim Cup, which is contested by teams from United States and Europe.

The inaugural Cup was held 9–11 December 2005, with a total purse of US$960,000 ($50,000 to each member of the winning team and $30,000 to members of the losing team).

In 2005, the two team captains were chosen early in the year and selected the players that made up their respective teams. Starting in 2006 a qualifying system was used, with each team composed of the top four players from the Women's World Golf Rankings, the top four remaining players from the ADT Official Money List, two sponsor's picks, and two captain's picks.

The tournament was a series of match play matches played over three days, Friday through Sunday, with each golfer playing every day. The Friday schedule had six foursomes matches; Saturday had six four-balls; and 12 singles matches are played on Sunday. This was a format modified from the Presidents Cup. If the scores were tied at the end of the singles matches, the captains competed in a sudden-death playoff.

A foursomes match is a competition between two teams of two golfers. The golfers on the same team take alternate shots on each hole with the same ball, with one golfer teeing off on all odd-numbered holes and the other teeing off on even-numbered holes. Each hole is won by the team that completes the hole in the fewest strokes. A four-ball match is also a competition between two teams of two golfers, but all four golfers play their own balls throughout the round rather than alternating shots, and each hole is won by the team whose individual golfer has the lowest score. A singles match is a standard matchplay competition between two golfers.

== Results ==
Year	Dates	Venue	Winning team	Score	Losing team	Asia captain	International captain
2008	28–30 Nov	Singapore Island Country Club, Singapore	International	12½–11½	Asia	(South Korea) Se Ri Pak	(Sweden) Annika Sörenstam
2007	7–9 Dec	The Vines Resort & Country Club, Australia	Asia	15–9	International	(South Korea) Se Ri Pak	(Sweden) Annika Sörenstam
2006	15–17 Dec	Tanah Merah Country Club, Singapore	Asia	12½–11½	International	(South Korea) Grace Park	(Sweden) Annika Sörenstam
2005	9–11 Dec	Tanah Merah Country Club, Singapore	International	16–8	Asia	(South Korea) Grace Park	(Sweden) Annika Sörenstam

== See also ==
- Solheim Cup
- Handa Cup
