= 2007 LPGA Tour =

Golf tour season

2007 LPGA Tour season
- Duration: January 19, 2007 – December 23, 2007
- Number of official events: 35
- Most wins: 8 (Mexico) Lorena Ochoa
- Money leader: (Mexico) Lorena Ochoa
- Rolex Player of the Year: (Mexico) Lorena Ochoa
- Vare Trophy: (Mexico) Lorena Ochoa
- Rookie of the Year: (Brazil) Angela Park

The 2007 LPGA Tour was a series of golf tournaments for elite female golfers from around the world that took place from February through December 2007. The tournaments were sanctioned by the United States–based Ladies Professional Golf Association (LPGA). In 2007, prize money on the LPGA Tour was $54.285 million, the highest to date.

Lorena Ochoa topped the money list with a record $4,364,994, easily surpassing Annika Sörenstam's previous record of $2,863,904 in 2002. Sörenstam was out most of the 2007 with neck and back injuries. Ochoa led the tour in victories in 2007 with eight wins; Suzann Pettersen of Norway had five.

The four major championships were won by: Morgan Pressel (Kraft Nabisco Championship), Suzann Pettersen (LPGA Championship), Cristie Kerr (U.S. Women's Open), and Lorena Ochoa (Women's British Open). All four majors were won by first-time major winners. The British Open also marked a breakthrough for women's golf; for the first time the event took place at historic St Andrews in Scotland, the fabled "home of golf," that had previously been off-limits to women.

In a slight reversal of a trend from recent years, Americans saw a relative resurgence in dominance in 2007, winning 12 events. For the first time since 2000, two Americans won majors. However, only one American, Paula Creamer, won more than one event, while Mexico's Lorena Ochoa won eight times and Norway's Suzann Pettersen five. Koreans won only four events, seven fewer than the 11 won in 2006.

For details of what happened in the main tournaments of the year see 2007 in golf.

== Tournament schedule and results ==
ADT Playoff Categories:

- winner: Official LPGA Tour events with a purse of at least $2,000,000. Winners of these events automatically qualify for the ADT Championship.
- standard: Winners do not automatically qualify for the ADT Championship; the ADT points system is used.
- unofficial: These events are not official LPGA Tour events and participation is not part of the ADT Playoff system.

The number in parentheses after winners' names show the player's total number of official money, individual event wins on the LPGA Tour including that event.

Date	Tournament	Location	ADT Playoff category	Winner	Purse ($)	Winner's share ($)
Jan 21	Women's World Cup of Golf	South Africa	unofficial	Paraguay (Julieta Granada / Celeste Troche)		
Feb 17	SBS Open at Turtle Bay	Hawaii	standard	(United States) Paula Creamer (3)	1,100,000	165,000
Feb 24	Fields Open in Hawaii	Hawaii	standard	(United States) Stacy Prammanasudh (2)	1,200,000	180,000
Mar 11	MasterCard Classic	Mexico	standard	(United States) Meaghan Francella (1)	1,200,000	180,000
Mar 25	Safeway International	Arizona	standard	(Mexico) Lorena Ochoa (10)	1,500,000	225,000
Apr 1	**Kraft Nabisco Championship**	California	winner	(United States) Morgan Pressel (1)	2,000,000	300,000
Apr 15	Ginn Open	Florida	winner	(United States) Brittany Lincicome (2)	2,600,000	390,000
Apr 29	Corona Championship	Mexico	standard	(Italy) Silvia Cavalleri (1)	1,300,000	195,000
May 6	SemGroup Championship	Oklahoma	standard	(South Korea) Mi Hyun Kim (8)	1,400,000	210,000
May 13	Michelob ULTRA Open at Kingsmill	Virginia	winner	(Norway) Suzann Pettersen (1)	2,200,000	330,000
May 20	Sybase Classic	New Jersey	standard	(Mexico) Lorena Ochoa (11)	1,400,000	210,000
May 27	LPGA Corning Classic	New York	standard	(South Korea) Young Kim (1)	1,300,000	195,000
Jun 3	Ginn Tribute Hosted by Annika	South Carolina	winner	(United States) Nicole Castrale (1)	2,600,000	390,000
Jun 10	**McDonald's LPGA Championship**	Maryland	winner	(Norway) Suzann Pettersen (2)	2,000,000	300,000
Jun 24	Wegmans LPGA	New York	standard	(Mexico) Lorena Ochoa (12)	1,800,000	270,000
End of first half of the season
Jul 1	**U.S. Women's Open**	North Carolina	winner	(United States) Cristie Kerr (10)	3,100,000	560,000
Jul 15	Jamie Farr Owens Corning Classic	Ohio	standard	(South Korea) Se Ri Pak (24)	1,300,000	195,000
Jul 22	HSBC Women's World Match Play Championship	New York	winner	(South Korea) Seon Hwa Lee (2)	2,000,000	500,000
Jul 29	Evian Masters	France	winner	(United States) Natalie Gulbis (1)	3,000,000	450,000
Aug 5	**Ricoh Women's British Open**	Scotland	winner	(Mexico) Lorena Ochoa (13)	2,000,000	320,512
Aug 19	CN Canadian Women's Open	Alberta	winner	(Mexico) Lorena Ochoa (14)	2,250,000	337,500
Aug 26	Safeway Classic	Oregon	standard	(Mexico) Lorena Ochoa (15)	1,700,000	255,000
Sep 2	LPGA State Farm Classic	Illinois	standard	(United States) Sherri Steinhauer (8)	1,300,000	195,000
Sep 9	LPGA NW Arkansas Championship*	Arkansas	standard	(United States) Stacy Lewis (n/a)	625,000	90,000
Sep 16	Solheim Cup	Sweden	n/a	United States	n/a	
Sep 30	Navistar LPGA Classic	Alabama	standard	(Sweden) Maria Hjorth (3)	1,300,000	195,000
Oct 7	Longs Drugs Challenge	California	standard	(Norway) Suzann Pettersen (3)	1,100,000	165,000
Oct 14	Samsung World Championship	California	standard	(Mexico) Lorena Ochoa (16)	1,000,000	250,000
Oct 21	Hana Bank-KOLON Championship	South Korea	standard	(Norway) Suzann Pettersen (4)	1,500,000	191,250
Oct 28	Honda LPGA Thailand	Thailand	standard	(Norway) Suzann Pettersen (5)	1,300,000	195,000
Nov 4	Mizuno Classic	Japan	standard	(Japan) Momoko Ueda (1)	1,400,000	210,000
Nov 11	The Mitchell Company LPGA Tournament of Champions	Alabama	standard	(United States) Paula Creamer (4)	1,000,000	150,000
Nov 18	ADT Championship	Florida	n/a	(Mexico) Lorena Ochoa (17)	1,550,000	1,000,000
Dec 9	Lexus Cup	Australia	unofficial	Team Asia	n/a	
Dec 23**	Wendy's 3-Tour Challenge	Nevada	unofficial	LPGA Tour	n/a	

Tournaments in bold are majors.
*The LPGA NW Arkansas Championship was not completed due to inclement weather. Only 18 holes were played so it was not an official tournament, nor did the money count as official money.
**The Wendy's 3-Tour Challenge was held on November 13. It was broadcast on television on December 22 and 23. The official LPGA Tour schedule listed the tournament dates based on the television broadcast.

== Leaders ==
Money List leaders

Rank	Player	Country	Earnings ($)	Events
1	Lorena Ochoa	Mexico	4,364,994	25
2	Suzann Pettersen	Norway	1,802,400	24
3	Paula Creamer	United States	1,384,798	24
4	Mi Hyun Kim	South Korea	1,273,848	27
5	Seon Hwa Lee	South Korea	1,100,198	28
6	Cristie Kerr	United States	1,098,921	22
7	Jang Jeong	South Korea	1,038,598	27
8	Angela Park	Brazil	983,922	28
9	Morgan Pressel	United States	972,452	25
10	Jee Young Lee	South Korea	966,256	24

Scoring Average leaders

Rank	Player	Country	Average
1	Lorena Ochoa	Mexico	69.69
2	Paula Creamer	United States	70.50
3	Suzann Pettersen	Norway	70.86
4	Annika Sörenstam	Sweden	71.27
5	Stacy Prammanasudh	United States	71.28

== Award winners ==
The three competitive awards given out by the LPGA each year are:

- The Rolex Player of the Year is awarded based on a formula in which points are awarded for top-10 finishes and are doubled at the LPGA's four major championships and at the season-ending ADT Championship. The points system is: 30 points for first; 12 points for second; nine points for third; seven points for fourth; six points for fifth; five points for sixth; four points for seventh; three points for eighth; two points for ninth and one point for 10th.
  - 2007 Winner: Lorena Ochoa. Runner-up: Suzann Pettersen
- The Vare Trophy, named for Glenna Collett-Vare, is given to the player with the lowest scoring average for the season.
  - 2007 Winner: Lorena Ochoa. Runner-up: Paula Creamer
- The Louise Suggs Rolex Rookie of the Year Award is awarded to the first-year player on the LPGA Tour who scores the highest in a points competition in which points are awarded at all full-field domestic events and doubled at the LPGA's four major championships. The points system is: 150 points for first; 80 points for second; 75 points for third; 70 points for fourth; and 65 points for fifth. After fifth place, points are awarded in increments of three, beginning at sixth place with 62 points. Rookies who make the cut in an event and finish below 41st each receive five points. The award is named after Louise Suggs, one of the founders of the LPGA.
  - 2007 Winner: Angela Park. Runner-up: In-Kyung Kim

== See also ==
- 2007 in golf
- 2007 Duramed Futures Tour
- 2007 Ladies European Tour
