= 2007 Kraft Nabisco Championship =

Coordinates: 33.798°N 116.433°W

Tournament information
- Dates: March 29 – April 1, 2007
- Location: Rancho Mirage, California
- Courses: Mission Hills Country Club; Dinah Shore Tourn. Course
- Tour: LPGA Tour
- Format: Stroke play - 72 holes

Statistics
- Par: 72
- Length: 6,673 yards (6,102 m)
- Field: 101 players, 72 after cut
- Cut: 153 (+9)
- Prize fund: $2.0 million
- Winner's share: $300,000

Champion
- (United States) Morgan Pressel
- 285 (−3)

Location in the United States
Location in California

The 2007 Kraft Nabisco Championship was the 36th Kraft Nabisco Championship, held March 29 to April 1 at Mission Hills Country Club in Rancho Mirage, California, southeast of Palm Springs. This was the 25th edition of the event as a major championship and the total purse was $2 million, with a winner's share of $300,000.

Morgan Pressel shot a bogey-free 69 in the final round to win her only major title, one stroke ahead of runners-up Brittany Lincicome, Catriona Matthew, and 54-hole co-leader Suzann Pettersen. Tied for ninth and four strokes back after the third round, Pressel gained her first victory on the LPGA Tour and became the youngest-ever winner of an LPGA major at 18 years, 313 days. The low amateur was collegian Stacy Lewis, a redshirt junior at Arkansas who carded a final round 70 (−2) and finished two strokes behind, in a four-way tie for fifth.

The 36-hole co-leaders at 140 (−4) were world number two Lorena Ochoa and number five Paula Creamer, with Petterson and first round leader Shi-Hyun Ahn a stroke back; all four were in search of their first major. Ochoa made a quadruple-bogey at 17 on Saturday, and Creamer shot 78 (+6) on Sunday. Top-ranked Annika Sorenstam made the cut, but just barely at 151 (+7).

Pettersen, 25, co-led with Se Ri Pak after the third round at 212 (−4) and had a four-stroke lead with four holes to play on Sunday. Double bogeys at 15 and 16, and a bogey on the par-3 17th dropped Pettersen a stroke back, and she missed a birdie putt on the final hole to force a playoff. She rebounded and gained her first LPGA Tour victory in May at Kingsmill, the next major at the LPGA Championship in June, and three additional victories in 2007.

Pressel's win vaulted her thirteen places in the world rankings, from seventeenth to a career-high fourth.

== Round summaries ==
=== First round ===
Thursday, March 29, 2007

Place	Player	Score	To par
1	(South Korea) Shi-Hyun Ahn	68	−4
T2	(Norway) Suzann Pettersen	69	−3
T2	(Australia) Lindsey Wright	69	−3
T4	(Sweden) Maria Hjorth	70	−2
T4	(South Korea) Jee Young Lee	70	−2
T4	(Scotland) Catriona Matthew	70	−2
T4	(Australia) Karrie Webb	70	−2
T8	(United States) Pat Hurst	71	−1
T8	(United States) Brittany Lang	71	−1
T8	(United States) Stacy Lewis (a)	71	−1
T8	(United States) Sherri Steinhauer	71	−1

=== Second round ===
Friday, March 30, 2007

Place	Player	Score	To par
T1	(United States) Paula Creamer	73-67=140	−4
T1	(Mexico) Lorena Ochoa	69-71=140	−4
T3	(South Korea) Shi-Hyun Ahn	68-73=141	−3
T3	(Norway) Suzann Pettersen	72-69=141	−3
5	(South Korea) Se Ri Pak	72-70=142	−2
T6	(Sweden) Maria Hjorth	70-73=143	−1
T6	(United States) Brittany Lincicome	72-71=143	−1
T6	(Scotland) Catriona Matthew	70-73=143	−1
T6	(Australia) Lindsey Wright	74-69=143	−1
T10	(United States) Meaghan Francella	72-72=144	E
T10	(United States) Brittany Lang	71-73=144	E
T10	(United States) Stacy Lewis (a)	71-73=144	E

Amateurs: Lewis (E), Choe (+9), Coutu (+9).

=== Third round ===
Saturday, March 31, 2007

Place	Player	Score	To par
T1	(South Korea) Se Ri Pak	72-70-70=212	−4
T1	(Norway) Suzann Pettersen	72-69-71=212	−4
T3	(United States) Paula Creamer	73-67-73=213	−3
T3	(United States) Meaghan Francella	72-72-69=213	−3
5	(United States) Brittany Lincicome	72-71-71=214	−2
T6	(South Korea) Shi-Hyun Ahn	68-73-74=215	−1
T6	(Sweden) Maria Hjorth	70-73-72=215	−1
T6	(Scotland) Catriona Matthew	70-73-72=215	−1
T9	(South Korea) Sarah Lee	68-73-74=216	E
T9	(United States) Stacy Prammanasudh	76-70-70=216	E
T9	(United States) Morgan Pressel	74-72-70=216	E

=== Final round ===
Sunday, April 1, 2007

Place	Player	Score	To par	Money ($)
1	(United States) Morgan Pressel	74-72-70-69=285	−3	300,000
T2	(United States) Brittany Lincicome	72-71-71-72=286	−2	140,945
T2	(Scotland) Catriona Matthew	70-73-72-71=286	−2	140,945
T2	(Norway) Suzann Pettersen	72-69-71-74=286	−2	140,945
T5	(South Korea) Shi-Hyun Ahn	68-73-74-72=287	−1	69,688
T5	(United States) Meaghan Francella	72-72-69-74=287	−1	69,688
T5	(United States) Stacy Prammanasudh	76-70-70-71=287	−1	69,688
T5	(United States) Stacy Lewis (a)	71-73-73-70=287	−1	0
9	(Sweden) Maria Hjorth	70-73-72-73=288	E	50,114
T10	(Mexico) Lorena Ochoa	69-71-77-72=289	+1	41,340
T10	(South Korea) Se Ri Pak	72-70-70-77=289	+1	41,340
T10	(United States) Angela Stanford	72-75-73-69=289	+1	41,340

Amateurs: Lewis (−1), Coutu (+18), Choe (+19).

==== Scorecard ====
Final round

Hole	1	2	3	4	5	6	7	8	9	10	11	12	13	14	15	16	17	18
Par	4	5	4	4	3	4	4	3	5	4	5	4	4	3	4	4	3	5
(United States) Pressel	E	−1	−1	−1	−1	−1	−1	−1	−1	−1	−1	−2	−2	−2	−2	−2	−2	−3
(United States) Lincicome	−2	−3	−3	−3	−2	−2	−2	−2	−1	−2	−3	−3	−3	−3	−2	−2	−2	−2
(Scotland) Matthew	E	−1	−1	−2	−3	−4	−4	−3	−4	−4	−4	−4	−3	−3	−3	−3	−3	−2
(Norway) Pettersen	−4	−4	−3	−3	−3	−3	−3	−4	−5	−5	−6	−6	−6	−6	−5	−3	−2	−2
(South Korea) Ahn	E	E	−1	−1	−1	E	E	E	E	−1	−1	E	+1	E	E	−1	−1	−1
(United States) Francella	−4	−4	−2	−2	−2	−2	−2	−2	−1	−1	−1	−2	−2	−2	−1	E	E	−1
(United States) Lewis	+1	+1	E	E	E	E	E	E	E	−1	E	−1	−1	−2	−2	−1	−1	−1
(United States) Prammanasudh	E	−1	−1	−1	−1	−2	−3	−3	−3	−3	−4	−4	−4	−3	−2	−2	−1	−1
(Sweden) Hjorth	−2	−2	−2	−1	E	E	E	E	E	E	−1	E	E	E	+1	E	E	E
(Mexico) Ochoa	+1	+1	+1	+2	+2	+2	+2	+3	+3	+3	+2	+1	+1	+1	+2	+2	+2	+1
(South Korea) Pak	−4	−5	−4	−5	−5	−5	−5	−4	−4	−3	−3	−4	−3	−3	−2	−1	E	+1
(United States) Stanford	+3	+3	+3	+3	+3	+3	+3	+3	+2	+2	+1	+1	+2	+2	+2	+2	+1	+1
(United States) Creamer	−2	−2	−1	−1	E	E	E	+1	+1	E	E	E	+1	+1	+1	+1	+2	+3

Cumulative tournament scores, relative to par

Eagle	Birdie	Bogey	Double bogey
