= Fields Open in Hawaii =

Golf tournament formerly on the LPGA Tour

The Fields Open in Hawaii was a golf tournament for professional female golfers, played on the LPGA Tour. It was held from 2006 and 2008 at the Ko Olina Resort in Kapolei, an incorporated community within the city of Honolulu, Hawaii, United States.

The tournament title sponsor was the Fields Corporation, a Japanese-based designer and manufacturer of game machines, such as Pachinko. The tournament was discontinued after the 2008 season due to sponsorship issues.

== Winners ==
Year	Dates	Champion	Country	Score	Purse ($)	Winner's share ($)
2008	Feb 21–23	Paula Creamer	United States	200 (−16)	1,300,000	195,000
2007	Feb 22–24	Stacy Prammanasudh	United States	202 (−14)	1,200,000	180,000
2006	Feb 23–25	Meena Lee	South Korea	202 (−14)	1,100,000	165,000

== Tournament record ==
Year	Player	Score	Round
2006	Lorena Ochoa	64 (−8)	1st
2008	Jeong Jang	64 (−8)	1st
2008	Song-Hee Kim	64 (−8)	2nd
