= Paula Creamer =

American professional golfer (born 1986)

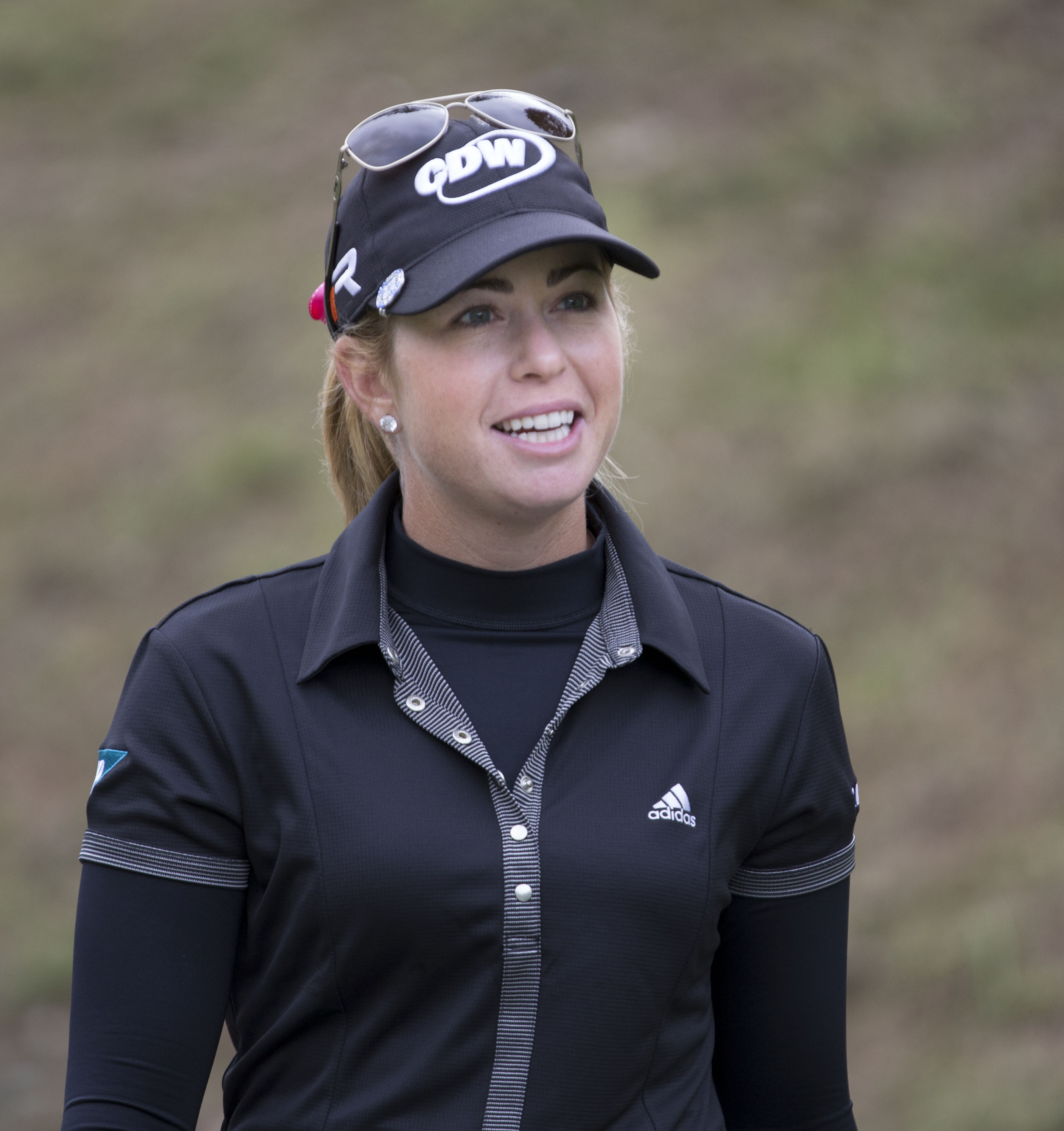
- Creamer at the 2013 Kingsmill Championship

Personal information
- Full name: Paula Creamer
- Nickname: The Pink Panther
- Nationality: United States
- Born: August 5, 1986 (age 40) Mountain View, California, U.S.
- Height: 5 ft 9 in (1.75 m)
- Spouse: Derek Heath (m. 2014; div. 2018)

Career
- Sport: Golf
- Turned professional: 2004
- Former tour: LPGA Tour (2005–2024)
- Professional wins: 12

Number of wins by tour
- LPGA Tour: 10
- LPGA of Japan Tour: 2

Best results in LPGA major championships (wins: 1)
- Chevron Championship: T13: 2013
- Women's PGA C'ship: T3: 2005, 2011
- U.S. Women's Open: Won: 2010
- Women's British Open: 3rd/T3: 2009, 2012
- Evian Championship: 7th: 2014

Achievements and awards
- American Junior Golf Association (AJGA) Player of the Year: 2003
- Golf Digest Junior of the Year: 2003
- Golf Digest Amateur of the Year: 2004
- LPGA Rookie of the Year: 2005
- (For a full list of awards, see here)

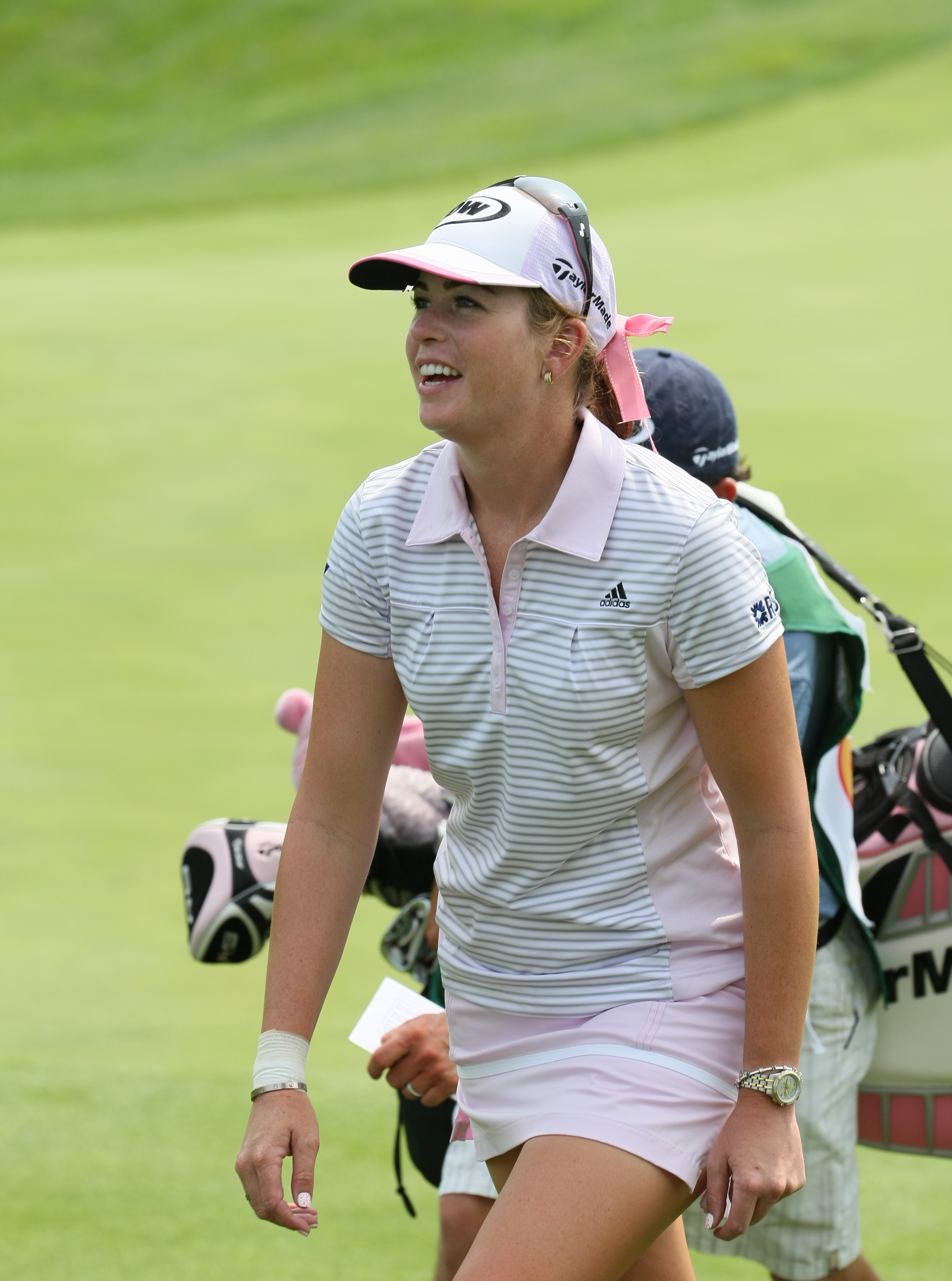
Creamer during practice round at the 2009 LPGA Championship

Paula Creamer (born August 5, 1986) is an American professional golfer on the U.S.-based LPGA Tour. As a professional, she has won 12 tournaments, including 10 LPGA Tour events. Creamer has been as high as number 2 in the Women's World Golf Rankings. She was the 2010 U.S. Women's Open champion. As of the end of the 2023 season, Creamer was 19th on the all-time LPGA career money list with earnings of $12,161,187.

As an amateur, Creamer won numerous junior golf titles, including 11 American Junior Golf Association (AJGA) tournaments. Creamer joined the LPGA Tour in the 2005 season, and her victory in that year's Sybase Classic made her the LPGA's second-youngest event winner.

== Early life and amateur career ==
Creamer was born in Mountain View, California, and raised in Pleasanton, the only child of an airline pilot father and stay-at-home mother. The family's home overlooked the first tee of the Castlewood Country Club's golf course. Creamer participated in acrobatic dancing and gymnastics during her childhood, and started playing golf when she was 10 years old. At the age of 12, she won 13 consecutive regional junior events in northern California, and the following year she became the top-ranked female junior golfer in California, before moving to Bradenton, Florida in 2000 and enrolling at IMG Pendleton School, a co-educational prep school for athletic students.

During Creamer's amateur career, she won 19 national tournaments, including 11 American Junior Golf Association events, and was named Player of the Year by the AJGA in 2003. On two occasions (2002 and 2003), Creamer played on the United States team in the Junior Solheim Cup. She was a semi-finalist in the 2003 U.S. Girls' Junior and U.S. Women's Amateur, and reached the same stage of both events the following year. In June 2004, Creamer placed second in the LPGA Tour's ShopRite LPGA Classic, finishing one stroke behind Cristie Kerr. Later that year she tied for 13th in the U.S. Women's Open and represented the United States in the Curtis Cup.

In December 2004, Creamer won the LPGA Final Qualifying Tournament by five strokes to secure membership on the Tour for the 2005 season. She opted to turn professional immediately after the event at the age of 18.

== Professional career ==
=== 2005–2007 ===
Upon joining the LPGA Tour in 2005, Creamer quickly became a top player. On May 22, she holed a 17-foot birdie putt on the final hole of the Sybase Classic in New Rochelle, New York, to win by one stroke. Creamer became the youngest winner of a multiple-round tournament in LPGA history. (Marlene Hagge won twice at a younger age than Creamer. Both wins came in 18-hole events.) Her record lasted until 2011, when Lexi Thompson won the Navistar LPGA Classic at the age of 16. Creamer graduated from the IMG Pendleton School the week after this victory.

On July 23, she claimed her second title of the year, winning the Evian Masters tournament in France by an eight-shot margin. She became the youngest and quickest player to reach $1 million in LPGA career earnings. In August Creamer won the NEC Open on the Japan LPGA tour, and added a victory at the Masters GC Ladies tournament two months later. Creamer earned a spot on the U.S. Solheim Cup Team, becoming the youngest player to do so. She helped the U.S. team win the cup, going 3–1–1 for the competition. Creamer won the LPGA Rookie of the Year award for her season, in which she earned over $1.5 million, second on the money list behind Annika Sörenstam, and recorded eight top-three finishes.

After her strong first-year performance, Creamer was second behind Sörenstam in the inaugural Women's World Golf Rankings, which were released on February 20, 2006. Her 2006 season, however, was not as successful. She did not win a tournament, and was hampered by wrist and foot injuries during the year. Creamer still managed to earn over $1 million and make the cut in all 27 LPGA tournaments in which she played, compiling 14 top-10 finishes. Her best result of the season was a tie for second at The Mitchell Company Tournament of Champions.

In 2007, Creamer rebounded with two LPGA Tour titles. On February 17, she won her third career LPGA title at the SBS Open at Turtle Bay, making a 40-foot birdie putt on the 17th hole of the final round to defeat Julieta Granada by one shot. In November, Creamer won The Mitchell Company Tournament of Champions, defeating Birdie Kim by eight strokes. She also played in her second Solheim Cup, leading both sides in points earned. Creamer went unbeaten in five matches as the U.S. team retained the cup. For the season, she posted 13 top-10 finishes and earned over $1.3 million, third on the money list.

=== 2008–2009 ===
In the 2008 season, Creamer won a career-high four LPGA events and made more than $1.8 million, the highest amount she has earned in a season. In February 2008, she earned her fifth LPGA title at the Fields Open in Hawaii, coming back from a late two-shot deficit with birdies on the final three holes. On April 27, Creamer came up short in a bid for her second win of the year, losing in a sudden-death playoff to Sörenstam at the Stanford International Pro-Am. The following week, Creamer bounced back at the SemGroup Championship by defeating Juli Inkster in a playoff. At the U.S. Women's Open, she entered the final round one shot off the lead and in good position to claim her first major championship victory. However, a five-over-par 78 on the last day dropped her into a tie for sixth.

On July 10 at the Jamie Farr Owens Corning Classic, she shot an 11-under 60, just one stroke off of the LPGA Tour record of 59 by Annika Sörenstam. She shot 60-65-70-73 to beat Nicole Castrale by two strokes. Creamer's fourth title of 2008 came in October's Samsung World Championship, where she won by one stroke and became the first American with four or more wins in an LPGA Tour season since Inkster had five tournament victories in 1999. In November of that same year, Creamer teamed with team International to defeat team Asia for the Lexus Cup.

At the LPGA Playoffs at the ADT, the last event of the 2008 season, Creamer was hospitalized with a stomach ailment, which was originally thought to be peritonitis. The ailment continued to affect her in the opening few months of the 2009 season, with doctors unable to make an exact diagnosis. At the 2009 U.S. Women's Open, held at Saucon Valley Country Club, Creamer finished tied for sixth. In her third Solheim Cup, she was 3–1 as the U.S. again won the competition. Creamer finished 10th on the 2009 LPGA money list with earnings of over $1.1 million. Her highest finishes during the season were a pair of second-place results, at the LPGA Corning Classic and Lorena Ochoa Invitational.

=== 2010–2011 ===
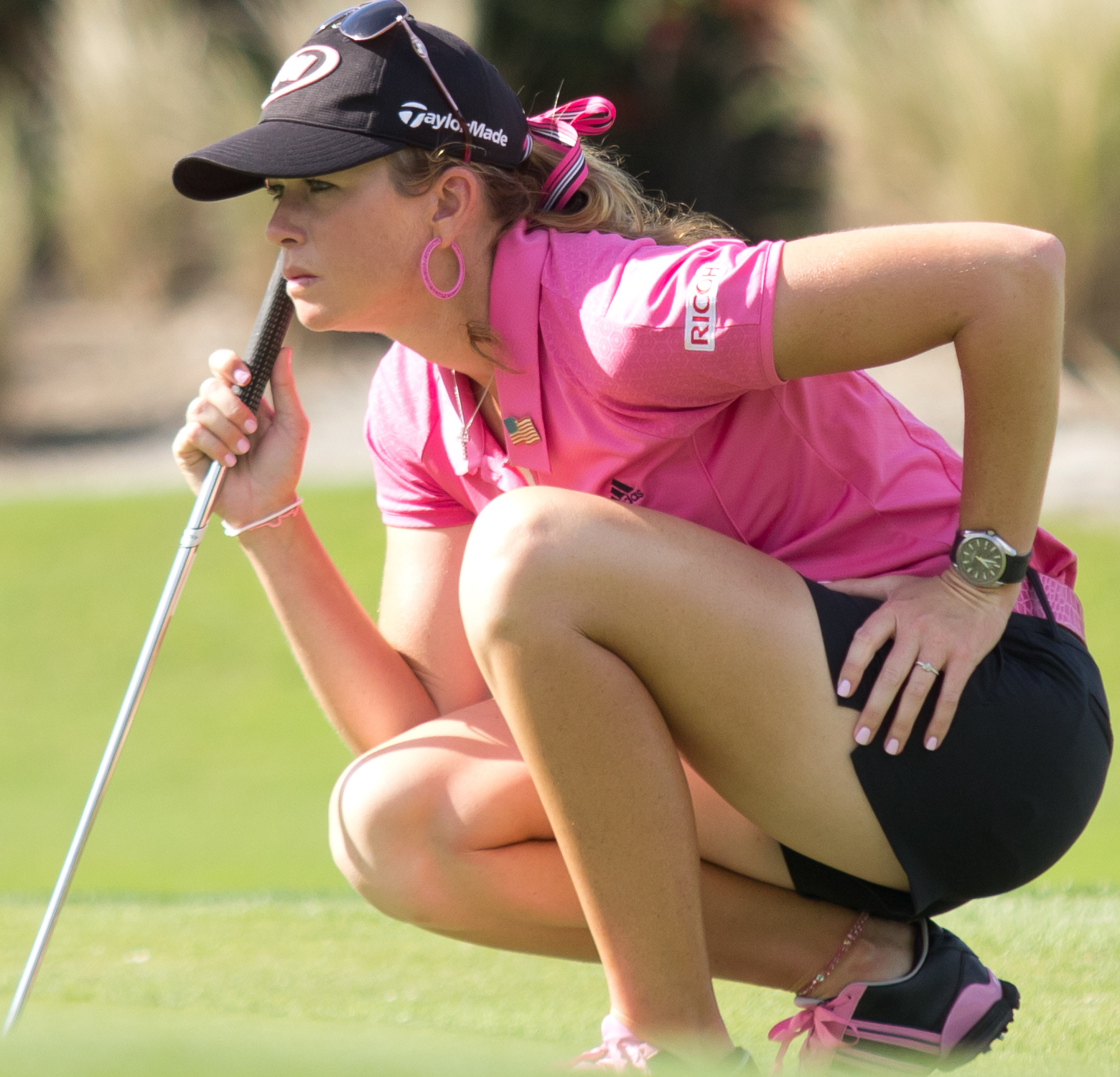
Creamer at the 2011 CME Group Titleholders

Creamer withdrew from the first event of the 2010 season with a left thumb injury, which she had first sustained in June 2009 at the Wegmans LPGA tournament. The injury, believed to be stretched ligaments, required surgery in March after rehabilitation efforts proved unsuccessful. During the surgery, more severe damage to her thumb was discovered, including ulnar collateral ligament and palmar plate tears. She was forced into an extended absence from golf, and her thumb was still healing by the time she returned in June. In her return event, the ShopRite LPGA Classic, Creamer finished in seventh place at 10-under-par. On July 11, 2010, in her fourth tournament after returning from her thumb surgery, Creamer won the U.S. Women's Open. She was the only golfer under par for the tournament, with a score of 3-under-par, four strokes ahead of Suzann Pettersen and Na Yeon Choi. It was the first victory in a major in Creamer's career. The U.S. Women's Open was her only win of the season, but she had four top-10s in 14 starts.

Creamer did not win a tournament during the 2011 season, though she did have seven top-five finishes and 10 top-10 finishes. Her highest finishes of the year were a pair of ties for second, at the RR Donnelley LPGA Founders Cup and CME Group Titleholders. Creamer was again selected to the U.S. Solheim Cup team in 2011. She posted victories in three of her first four matches, but lost in the singles to Catriona Matthew by a 6&5 score, as the American team lost to Europe.

=== 2012–2013 ===
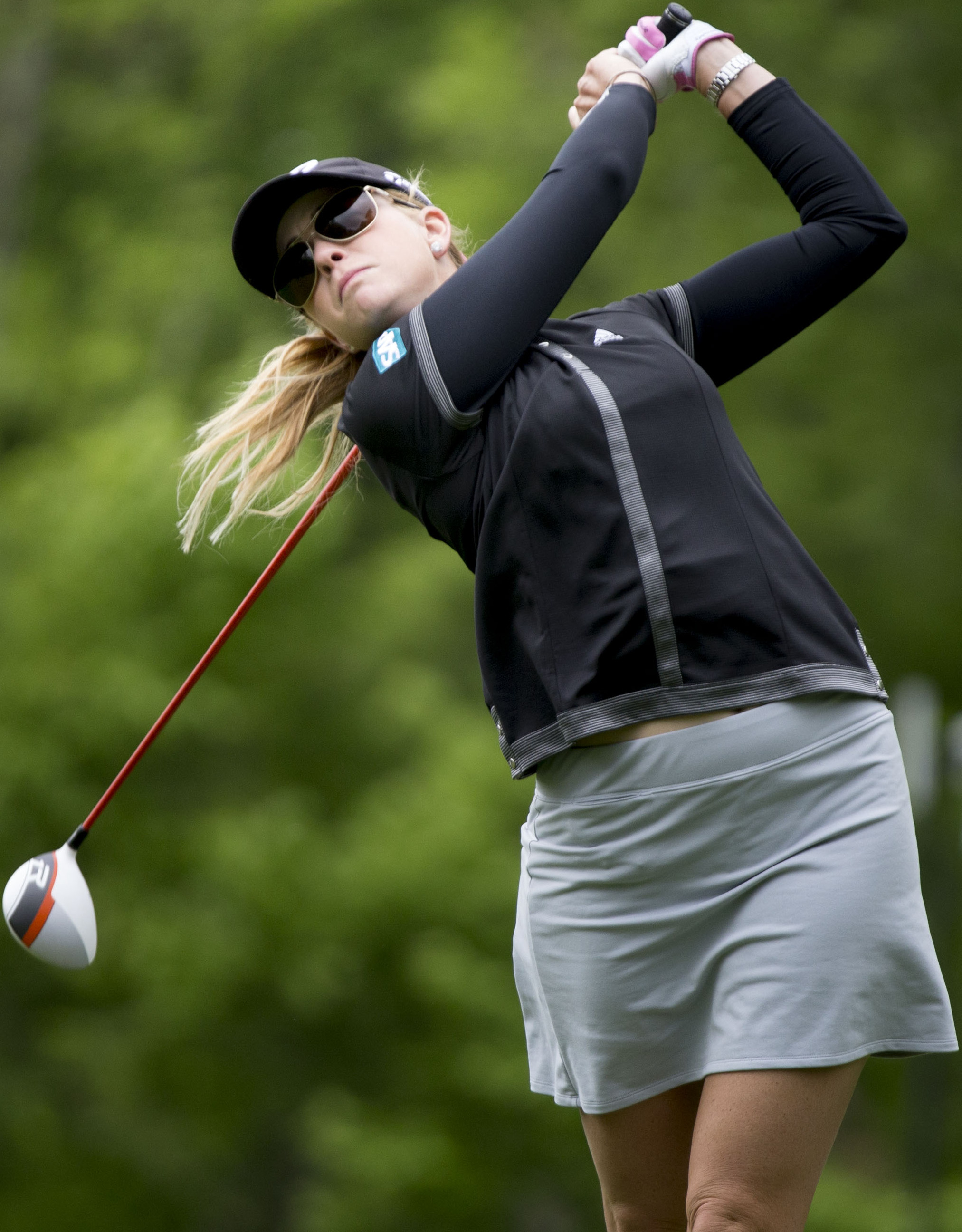
Creamer at the 2013 Kingsmill Championship

At the 2012 Kingsmill Championship, Creamer finished the tournament tied with Jiyai Shin, and the two entered a playoff. They played eight playoff holes, each parring every time. The playoff was then suspended because of darkness, and it resumed the following day. Creamer bogeyed the ninth playoff hole, losing to Shin's par. It was the longest two-player playoff in LPGA Tour history. The following week, she recorded a third-place finish at the Women's British Open.

Creamer earned over $800,000 and had seven top-10 finishes in the 2012 season, but was again unable to win any events.

During the 2013 season, she made over $800,000 and finished in the top-10 six times. She also appeared in the 2013 Solheim Cup, but lost three of her four matches as the U.S. team lost 18–10.

=== 2014–2016 ===
Creamer's 2014 began with two T-3 finishes in her first two tournaments, the ISPS Handa Women's Australian Open and the Pure Silk-Bahamas LPGA Classic. On March 2, 2014, Creamer captured her first LPGA tournament since the 2010 U.S. Women's Open. At the HSBC Women's Champions tournament in Singapore, she was tied with Azahara Muñoz after 72 holes. On the second playoff hole, she sank a 75-foot eagle putt for the win. For the remainder of the season, Creamer had one other top-10 result, a seventh-place finish at the 2014 Evian Championship. Her earnings in the 2014 LPGA Tour season were over $700,000, outside the top 20. Her money list ranking of 22nd was her lowest to date.

After a stretch of four straight missed cuts, Creamer fell outside the top 40 in the world rankings by September 2015; she was dealing with the effects of swing and equipment changes. Despite not qualifying on points for the 2015 Solheim Cup team, Creamer was chosen for her sixth appearance in the event as a captain's pick. As part of a U.S. comeback from a 10–6 deficit entering the final session, she contributed the Cup-clinching point with a win in her singles match. For the 2015 season, her earnings were under $400,000, 47th on tour.

Creamer changed swing instructors before the start of the 2016 season. Having worked with David Whelan for 15 years, she began receiving instruction from Gary Gilchrist after Whelan left his position at IMG Academy. At the first LPGA tournament of 2016, Creamer posted a top-five result at the Pure Silk-Bahamas LPGA Classic. She tied for fourth place at the JTBC Founders Cup, before going into an extended slump in performance in which she missed the cut seven times. Her 2016 LPGA Tour earnings fell under $300,000, outside the top 60.

=== 2017–2024 ===
At one point at the 2017 season, Creamer missed the cut four times in five tournaments, including the U.S. Women's Open. She was forced to play in a qualifier to earn a spot in the Women's British Open, and did not make the initial 2017 Solheim Cup team. However, she was chosen as an alternate after the withdrawal of Jessica Korda due to an injury. Creamer won three of her four matches as the U.S. team retained the Cup. In September, at the Evian Championship, an injured left wrist caused her to withdraw. After another withdrawal, she underwent season-ending surgery. Creamer had one top-10 finish in 2017, a tie for seventh at the ShopRite LPGA Classic. She ended the year in 89th place on the LPGA Tour money list with under $150,000 in season earnings.

In 2018, Creamer fell outside the top 100 in earnings, making about $71,000. Her highest finish of the season was 12th place at the Buick LPGA Shanghai, the last event in which she played. The following season, she improved to 91st on the money list with approximately $145,000 in earnings. Creamer had two top-10 results in 2019, with a tie for sixth at the Dow Great Lakes Bay Invitational her best finish. After skipping the entire 2020 season to heal wrist and thumb injuries, Creamer returned to play some events in 2021, making one cut in seven tournaments she competed in. She then took a break from tournament play for over a year due to maternity leave, returning in mid-2022. In her five tournaments played that year, she made two cuts.

Creamer played in 13 tournaments in 2023, missing the cut in all but two of them. As of the end of the 2023 season, Creamer was 19th on the all-time LPGA career money list with earnings of $12,161,187. In 2024, she served as an assistant captain on the victorious U.S. Solheim Cup team.

== Playing style ==
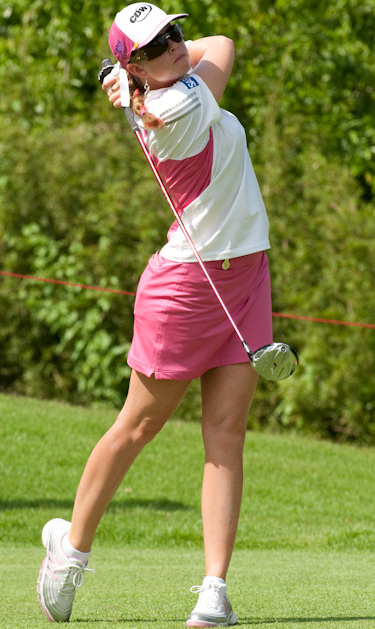
Creamer's golf swing

Creamer's drives are relatively short; her 2012 average driving distance of about 245 yards ranked 193rd on the LPGA Tour. Former player Beth Daniel has said of Creamer that her short hitting is "stopping her from being a dominating player". However, she is considered an accurate ball-striker. Creamer ranked outside the top 100 in putts per round in 2012, and Golf World magazine's Ryan Herrington described her putting as "sometimes balky". While she was the LPGA leader in greens in regulation in 2009 and was regularly high in the tour rankings for the statistic early in her career, by 2014 she fell to 51st.

Due to her fondness for wearing pink, Creamer's friend Casey Wittenberg nicknamed her the "Pink Panther." The sobriquet followed her when she turned pro. In addition to her pink outfits, Creamer sports the color on several of her golf accessories, including her club grips and golf bag. Creamer also uses a Pink Panther club head cover, in a nod to her nickname. From 2006 to 2009, she used a pink golf ball, provided by Precept Golf, during the last round of some tournaments.

== Personal life ==
In 2007, Creamer moved to Isleworth in Windermere, Florida.

Creamer has endorsement deals with companies including TaylorMade-Adidas, Citizen Watch Co., Ricoh, and Bridgestone Golf. Forbes estimated her 2013 endorsement income to be $4.5 million, and her total income placed her among the 10 highest-earning female athletes that year. Her likeness has been featured in EA Sports' Tiger Woods PGA Tour series of golf video games.

Since 2005, Creamer has done charitable work for The First Tee, an organization that benefits junior golfers. She hosts the Paula 4 Kids Celebrity Event, an annual outing that raises money for The First Tee of Sarasota/Manatee. In addition, Creamer has appeared at youth golf clinics and donated scholarships to IMG Academy. She also has a foundation that aids junior golfers and military families.

On December 16, 2013, Creamer announced her engagement to Derek Heath, a United Airlines pilot and United States Air Force veteran. The couple were married in 2014. On March 11, 2018, Creamer told Golfweek that she and Heath were "no longer together." As of 2021, she is engaged to former baseball player Shane Kennedy. She gave birth to her first child on January 7, 2022.

== Awards and honors ==
- In 2003, Creamer was honored as the American Junior Golf Association Player of the Year.
- In 2003, she was bestowed as the Golfweek Junior of the Year.
- In 2004, Creamer earned Golf Digest Amateur of the Year honors and was named the Golfweek Amateur of the Year.
- In 2005, Creamer was bestowed by the American Junior Golf Association with the Nancy Lopez Award.
- In 2005, she also earned LPGA Rookie of the Year honors.

== Professional wins (12) ==
=== LPGA Tour (10) ===
Legend
LPGA Tour major championships (1)
Other LPGA Tour (9)

No.	Date	Tournament	Winning score	To par	Margin of victory	Runner(s)-up	Winner's share ($)
1	May 22, 2005	Sybase Classic	69-68-71-70=278	−6	1 stroke	(South Korea) Jeong Jang (South Korea) Gloria Park	187,500
2	Jul 23, 2005	Evian Masters	68-68-66-71=273	−15	8 strokes	(Mexico) Lorena Ochoa (United States) Michelle Wie	375,000
3	Feb 17, 2007	SBS Open at Turtle Bay	67-70-70=207	−9	1 stroke	(Paraguay) Julieta Granada	165,000
4	Nov 11, 2007	The Mitchell Company Tournament of Champions	67-65-68-68=268	−20	8 strokes	(South Korea) Birdie Kim	150,000
5	Feb 23, 2008	Fields Open in Hawaii	66-68-66=200	−16	1 stroke	(South Korea) Jeong Jang	195,000
6	May 4, 2008	SemGroup Championship	70-71-69-72=282	−2	Playoff	(United States) Juli Inkster	270,000
7	Jul 13, 2008	Jamie Farr Owens Corning Classic	60-65-70-73=268	−16	2 strokes	(United States) Nicole Castrale	195,000
8	Oct 5, 2008	Samsung World Championship	68-74-68-69=279	−9	1 stroke	(South Korea) Song-Hee Kim	250,000
9	Jul 11, 2010	U.S. Women's Open	72-70-70-69=281	−3	4 strokes	(South Korea) Na Yeon Choi (Norway) Suzann Pettersen	585,000
10	Mar 2, 2014	HSBC Women's Champions	67-73-69-69=278	−10	Playoff	(Spain) Azahara Muñoz	210,000

LPGA Tour playoff record (2–2)

No.	Year	Tournament	Opponent	Result
1	2008	Stanford International Pro-Am	(Sweden) Annika Sörenstam	Lost to par on first extra hole
2	2008	SemGroup Championship	(United States) Juli Inkster	Won with birdie on second extra hole
3	2012	Kingsmill Championship	(South Korea) Jiyai Shin	Lost to par on ninth extra hole
4	2014	HSBC Women's Champions	(Spain) Azahara Muñoz	Won with eagle on second extra hole

=== LPGA of Japan Tour (2) ===
- 2005 (2) NEC Karuizawa 72, Masters GC Ladies

== Major championships ==
=== Wins (1) ===
Year	Championship	Winning score	Margin	Runners-up
2010	U.S. Women's Open	−3 (72-70-70-69=281)	4 strokes	(South Korea) Na Yeon Choi, (Norway) Suzann Pettersen

=== Results timeline ===
Results not in chronological order before 2018.

Tournament	2003	2004	2005	2006	2007	2008	2009	2010	2011	2012
ANA Inspiration		T45	T19	T24	T15	T21	T17		T19	T20
U.S. Women's Open	CUT	T13TLA	T19	T16	T16	T6	T6	1	T15	T7
Women's PGA Championship			T3	T49	T6	T10	T16	T42	T3	T9
Women's British Open			T15	T22	T7	T9	T3	T21	T43	3

Tournament	2013	2014	2015	2016	2017	2018	2019	2020
ANA Inspiration	T13	T34	T35	T36	T47	T64		
U.S. Women's Open	T4	T15	T42	T59	CUT	CUT	CUT	
Women's PGA Championship	T58	CUT	T34	CUT	T72	T55	CUT	
The Evian Championship ^	T19	7	CUT	T55	WD	T54	T55	NT
Women's British Open	T11	T21	CUT	CUT	T16		CUT	

Tournament	2021
ANA Inspiration	
U.S. Women's Open	CUT
Women's PGA Championship	
The Evian Championship	CUT
Women's British Open	

^ The Evian Championship was added as a major in 2013

Win
Top 10
Did not play

LA = Low amateur
CUT = missed the half-way cut
WD = withdrew
NT = no tournament
T = tied

=== Summary ===
Tournament	Wins	2nd	3rd	Top-5	Top-10	Top-25	Events	Cuts made
ANA Inspiration	0	0	0	0	0	8	14	14
U.S. Women's Open	1	0	0	2	5	11	18	13
Women's PGA Championship	0	0	2	2	5	6	15	12
The Evian Championship	0	0	0	0	1	2	8	5
Women's British Open	0	0	2	2	4	10	14	11
Totals	1	0	4	6	15	37	69	55

- Most consecutive cuts made – 41 (2004 Kraft Nabisco – 2014 British Open)
- Longest streak of top-10s – 3 (twice)

== LPGA Tour career summary ==
Year	Tournaments played	Cuts made*	Wins	2nds	3rds	Top 10s	Best finish	Earnings ($)	Money list rank	Scoring average	Scoring rank
2003	3	2	0	0	0	0	T67	n/a	n/a	74.80	n/a
2004	7	7	0	1	0	1	T2	n/a	n/a	71.42	n/a
2005	25	24	2	4	2	11	1	1,531,780	2	70.98	3
2006	27	27	0	1	2	14	T2	1,076,163	11	70.62	6
2007	24	22	2	2	2	13	1	1,384,798	3	70.50	2
2008	26	26	4	1	2	15	1	1,823,992	2	70.56	3
2009	21	20	0	2	4	10	2	1,151,864	9	70.62	10
2010	14	10	1	0	0	4	1	883,870	10	71.00	10
2011	21	21	0	2	2	10	T2	926,338	9	70.84	5
2012	23	23	0	1	1	7	2	815,574	15	70.95	11
2013	23	23	0	1	1	6	2	831,918	11	70.80	14
2014	23	21	1	0	2	4	1	702,691	22	71.38	27
2015	25	19	0	0	0	4	T5	363,485	47	71.69	42
2016	24	17	0	0	0	3	T4	281,174	66	71.57	47
2017	19	10	0	0	0	1	T7	141,428	89	71.87	83
2018	17	9	0	0	0	0	12	71,185	113	72.08	87
2019	22	10	0	0	0	2	T6	145,472	91	72.60	129
2020	Did not play										
2021	7	1	0	0	0	0	T70	3,018	186	73.50	n/a
2022	5	2	0	0	0	0	T29	17,679	175	72.29	n/a
2023	13	2	0	0	0	0	T54	8,668	185	73.71	159
2024	8	0	0	0	0	0	MC	0	n/a	74.13	n/a

Official as of 2024 season
* Includes matchplay and other tournaments without a cut.

== World ranking ==
Position in Women's World Golf Rankings at the end of each calendar year.

Year	World ranking	Notes
2006	8	
2007	5	
2008	4	
2009	6	
2010	11	
2011	5	
2012	12	
2013	13	
2014	19	
2015	62	
2016	87	
2017	139	
2018	178	
2019	195	
2020	245	
2021	492	
2022	814	
2023	872	
2024	1,409	

== Team appearances ==
Amateur

- Junior Solheim Cup (representing the United States): 2002 (winners), 2003
- Curtis Cup (representing the United States): 2004 (winners)
- Espirito Santo Trophy (representing the United States): 2004

Professional

- Lexus Cup (representing International team): 2005 (winners), 2006, 2008 (winners)
- Solheim Cup (representing the United States): 2005 (winners), 2007 (winners), 2009 (winners), 2011, 2013, 2015 (winners), 2017 (winners)
- World Cup (representing the United States): 2006
- International Crown (representing the United States): 2014

=== Solheim Cup record ===
Year	Total matches	Total W–L–H	Singles W–L–H	Foursomes W–L–H	Fourballs W–L–H	Points won	Points %
Career	31	17–9–5	5–2–0	7–4–3	5–3–2	19.5	62.9
2005	5	3–1–1	1–0–0 def. L. Davies 7&5	1–0–1 halved w/ B. Daniel, won w/ J. Inkster 3&2	1–1–0 lost w/ J. Inkster 4&3, won w/ C. Kerr 1 up	3.5	70
2007	5	2–0–3	1–0–0 def. M. Hjorth 2&1	1–0–1 won w/ J. Inkster 2&1, halved w/ J. Inkster	0–0–2 halved w/ M. Pressel, halved w/ B. Lincicome	3.5	70
2009	4	3–1–0	1–0–0 def. S. Pettersen 3&2	1–1–0 won w/ J. Inkster 2&1, lost w/ J. Inkster 4&3	1–0–0 won w/ C. Kerr 1 up	3	75
2011	5	3–1–1	0–1–0 lost to C. Matthew 6&5	1–0–1 won w/ B. Lincicome 1 up, halved w/ C. Kerr	2–0–0 won w/ M. Pressel 1 up, won w/ B. Lincicome 3&1	3.5	70
2013	4	1–3–0	0–1–0 lost to C. Hull 5&4	1–1–0 lost w/ C. Kerr 2&1, won w/ S. Lewis 1 up	0–1–0 lost w/ L. Thompson 2 dn	1	25
2015	4	2–2–0	1–0–0 def. S. Gal 4&3	1–1–0 won w/ M. Pressel 3&2, lost w/ M. Pressel 1 dn	0–1–0 lost w/ M. Pressel 4&3	2	50
2017	4	3–1–0	1–0–0 def. G. Hall 1 up	1–1–0 lost w/ A. Ernst 3&1, won w/ A. Ernst 5&3	1–0–0 won w/ A. Ernst 2&1	3	75

== See also ==
- List of golfers with most LPGA Tour wins

== Sources ==
- "Creamer, Paula". Current Biography Yearbook 2011. Ipswich, Massachusetts: H.W. Wilson. 2011. ISBN 9780824211219.
