= SemGroup Championship =

Golf tournament for professional female golfers that was part of the LPGA Tour

Tournament information
- Location: Tulsa, Oklahoma
- Established: 2001
- Tour: LPGA Tour
- Final year: 2008

Final champion
- Paula Creamer

The SemGroup Championship was a golf tournament for professional female golfers that was part of the LPGA Tour. It was played annually from 2001 to 2008 in Tulsa, Oklahoma.

The tournament was originally known as the Williams Championship, with the Williams Companies as the title sponsor. John Q. Hammons Hotels & Resorts was the title sponsor from 2003 to 2006. In 2007, SemGroup, a Tulsa-based firm providing diversified services for end users and consumers of energy products, took over as the title sponsor. SemGroup filed for bankruptcy protection in July 2008; in November 2008, the LPGA and tournament managers announced that they had been unable to find a replacement sponsor, and that the 2009 tournament would be cancelled.

Tournament names through the years:

- 2001-2002: Williams Championship
- 2003: John Q. Hammons Hotel Classic
- 2004: John Q. Hammons Hotel Classic presented by Ford
- 2005-2006: John Q. Hammons Hotel Classic
- 2007-2008: SemGroup Championship Presented by John Q. Hammons

== Winners ==
Year	Dates	Champion	Country	Score	Course	Purse ($)	Winner's share ($)
2008*	May 1–4	Paula Creamer	United States	282 (−2)	Cedar Ridge Country Club	1,800,000	270,000
2007*	May 4–6	Mi Hyun Kim	South Korea	210 (−3)	Cedar Ridge Country Club	1,400,000	195,000
2006	Sep 8–10	Cristie Kerr	United States	199 (−14)	Cedar Ridge Country Club	1,000,000	150,000
2005	Sep 16–18	Annika Sörenstam	Sweden	208 (−5)	Cedar Ridge Country Club	1,000,000	150,000
2004	Sep 10–12	Annika Sörenstam	Sweden	204 (−9)	Cedar Ridge Country Club	1,000,000	150,000
2003	Sep 5–7	Karrie Webb	Australia	200 (−10)	Tulsa Country Club	1,000,000	150,000
2002	Sep 6–8	Annika Sörenstam	Sweden	199 (−11)	Tulsa Country Club	1,000,000	150,000
2001	Sep 7–9	Gloria Park	South Korea	201 (−9)	Tulsa Country Club	1,000,000	150,000

* Championship won in sudden-death playoff.

== Tournament record ==
Year	Player	Score	Round	Course
2001	Donna Andrews	62 (−8)	2nd round	Tulsa Country Club, par 70
2006	Cristie Kerr	61 (−10)	2nd	Cedar Ridge Country Club, par 71
