= Stacy Prammanasudh =

American professional golfer (born 1979)

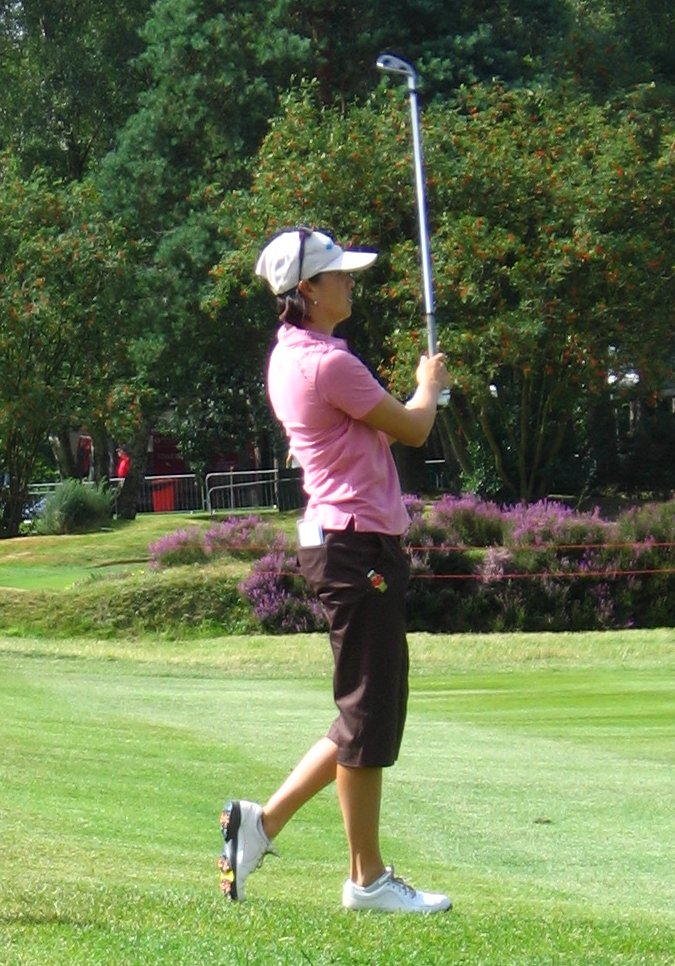
- Prammanasudh in 2008

Personal information
- Nickname: Stacy P
- Nationality: United States
- Born: September 23, 1979 (age 47) Enid, Oklahoma, U.S.
- Height: 5 ft 6 in (1.68 m)

Career
- Sport: Golf
- College: University of Tulsa
- Turned professional: 2002
- Former tours: LPGA Tour (2004–13); Futures Tour (2002–03)
- Professional wins: 4

Number of wins by tour
- LPGA Tour: 2
- Epson Tour: 2

Best results in LPGA major championships
- Chevron Championship: T5: 2007
- Women's PGA C'ship: T15: 2007
- U.S. Women's Open: T3: 2006
- Women's British Open: T16: 2007
- Evian Championship: DNP

Achievements and awards
- Futures Tour Player of the Year: 2003

Stacy Prammanasudh (born September 23, 1979) is a retired American professional golfer who played on the LPGA Tour from 2004 to 2013.

== Amateur career ==
Prammanasudh was born in Enid, Oklahoma, to an American mother and a native Thai father who immigrated to the United States from Thailand. She was raised in Oklahoma, and attended the University of Tulsa where she won the Stanford Pepsi Intercollegiate from 1999 to 2001 and was a three-year Academic All-American, from 2000 through 2002. Prammanasudh was also a First-Team All-American from 1999 through 2002. She was the recipient of the Edith Cummings Munson Golf Award in 2001, which is given to one of the top female collegiate golfers who excels in academics. She finished her senior season ranked second in the nation and won 10 collegiate events throughout her college career. This is the second-most in the school's history, behind only Nancy Lopez's 11 titles.

== Professional career ==
After graduating from college in June 2002, Prammanasudh joined the Futures Tour. In the fall of 2002, she competed in the LPGA Qualifying School, finishing tied for 24th, which earned her non-exempt status on the LPGA Tour for 2003. Competing on both the Futures Tour and LPGA Tour in 2003, Prammanasudh won two Futures events and finished in the top-10 in nine other events. She won the Futures Tour Player of the Year award, which earned her fully exempt status on the LPGA for 2004.

Her only win on the LPGA Tour came in 2005 at the Franklin American Mortgage Championship.

Until 2007, Prammanasudh's father, Pravat "Lou" Prammanasudh, a native of Thailand, served as her caddie. He retired in 2007 and her husband Pete Upton caddied for her until her retirement in 2013.

== Professional wins (4) ==
=== LPGA Tour (2) ===
No.	Date	Tournament	Winning score	To par	Margin of victory	Runner-up
1	May 1, 2005	Franklin American Mortgage Championship	70-70-65-69=274	−14	3 strokes	(Mexico) Lorena Ochoa
2	Feb 24, 2007	Fields Open in Hawaii	66-68-68=202	−14	1 stroke	(South Korea) Jee-Young Lee

=== Futures Tour (2) ===
- 2003 (2) Frye Chevrolet Classic, Lincoln Financial Futures Golf Classic

== Results in LPGA majors ==
Tournament	2001	2002	2003	2004	2005	2006	2007	2008	2009	2010	2011	2012	2013
Kraft Nabisco Championship				T13	T30	T11	T5	CUT	CUT	T48	T19	CUT	CUT
LPGA Championship				T23	T33	CUT	T15	T46	T49	T64	T57	CUT	WD
U.S. Women's Open	CUT	T22	CUT	CUT	CUT	T3	CUT	12	T57	CUT	CUT	CUT	
Women's British Open				CUT	CUT	CUT	T16	T24	T67	T43	CUT		
The Evian Championship ^													

^ The Evian Championship was added as a major in 2013.

Top 10
Did not play

CUT = missed the half-way cut
WD = withdrew
"T" = tied

=== Summary ===
Tournament	Wins	2nd	3rd	Top-5	Top-10	Top-25	Events	Cuts made
Kraft Nabisco Championship	0	0	0	1	1	4	10	6
LPGA Championship	0	0	0	0	0	2	10	7
U.S. Women's Open	0	0	1	1	1	3	12	4
Women's British Open	0	0	0	0	0	2	8	4
The Evian Championship	0	0	0	0	0	0	0	0
Totals	0	0	1	2	2	11	40	21

- Most consecutive cuts made – 5 (2009 LPGA – 2010 LPGA)
- Longest streak of top-10s – 1 (twice)

== Team appearances ==
Professional

- Solheim Cup (representing the United States): 2007 (winners)
- Lexus Cup (representing International team): 2006, 2007
