= Franklin American Mortgage Championship =

Golf tournament formerly on the LPGA Tour

Tournament information
- Location: Franklin, Tennessee, U.S.
- Established: 2004
- Courses: Vanderbilt Legends Club; Iron Horse Course
- Par: 72
- Tour: LPGA Tour
- Format: 72 holes stroke play
- Final year: 2006

Tournament record score
- Aggregate: 269 Cristie Kerr (2006)
- To par: −19 as above

Final champion
- (United States) Cristie Kerr

The Franklin American Mortgage Championship was a golf tournament for professional female golfers that was part of the LPGA Tour. It was played annually between 2004 and 2006 at the Vanderbilt Legends Club, Iron Horse Course in Franklin, Tennessee.

The title sponsor was the Franklin American Mortgage Company, a residential mortgage company based in Franklin. Country music singers Vince Gill and Amy Grant served as hosts of the event.

Proceeds from the event benefited the Monroe Carrel Jr. Children's Hospital at Vanderbilt University.

The 2007 tournament had been scheduled for April 19 through April 22. LPGA Commissioner Carolyn Bivens announced the tournament when presenting the 2007 schedule to the public on November 16, 2006. However, less than two weeks later, on November 28, 2006, Franklin American CEO Dan Crockett announced that the company had declined to renew its contract, putting the tournament in jeopardy. Shortly thereafter, the LPGA removed the event from its 2007 schedule without official comment.

== Winners ==
Year	Champion	Country	Score	Purse ($)	Winner's share ($)
2006	Cristie Kerr	United States	269 (−19)	1,100,000	165,000
2005	Stacy Prammanasudh	United States	274 (−14)	1,000,000	150,000
2004	Lorena Ochoa	Mexico	272 (−16)	900,000	135,000

== Tournament record ==
Year	Player	Score	Round
2006	Sophie Gustafson	63 (−9)	2nd
