= Lorena Ochoa =

Mexican professional golfer (born 1981)

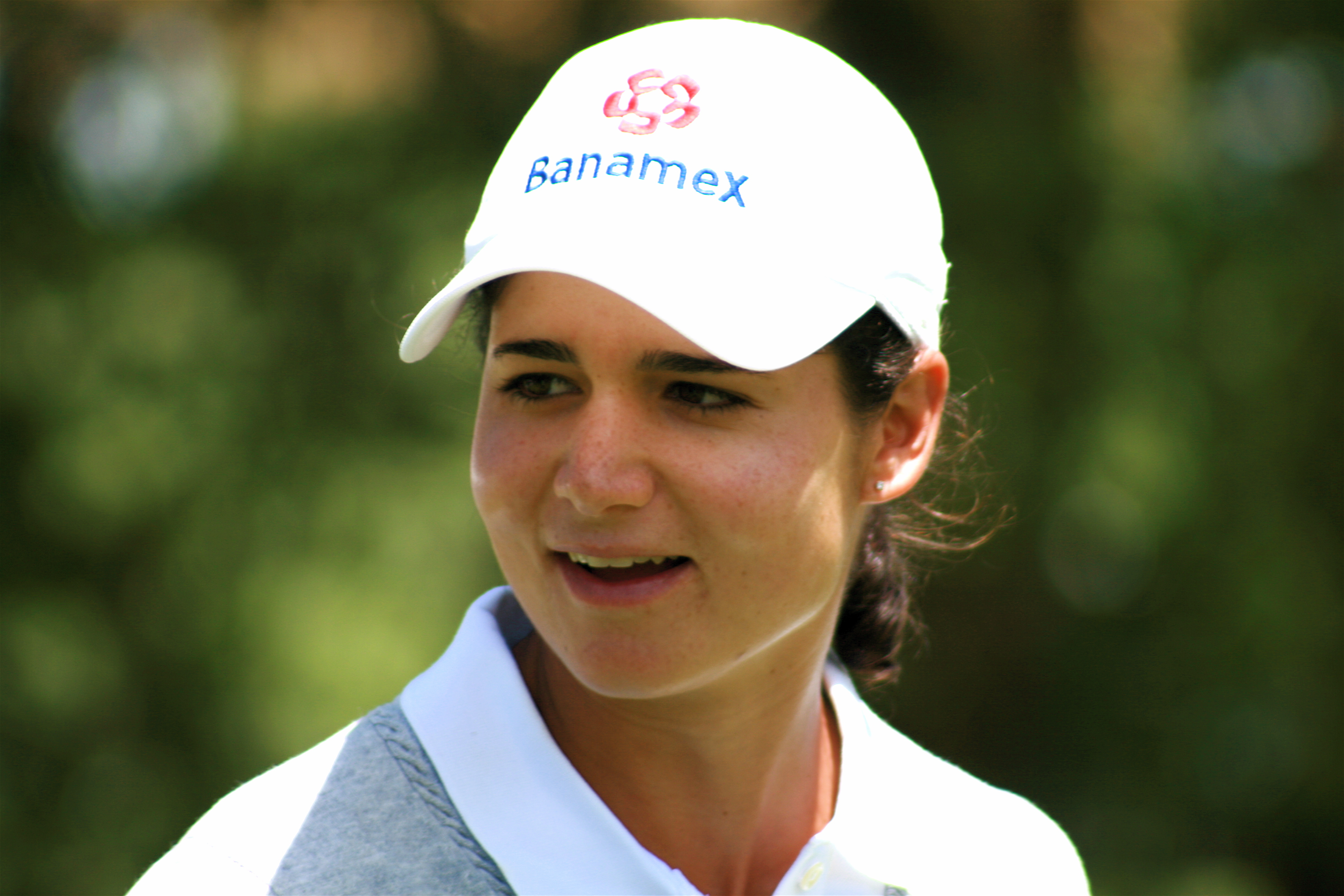
- Ochoa in 2008

Personal information
- Nationality: Mexico
- Born: 15 November 1981 (age 45) Guadalajara, Jalisco, Mexico
- Height: 5 ft 6 in (1.68 m)
- Spouses: Andrés Conesa Labastida (m. 2009-2025)

Career
- Sport: Golf
- College: University of Arizona
- Turned professional: 2002
- Current tour: LPGA Tour (joined 2003)
- Former tour: Futures Tour (joined 2002)
- Professional wins: 30

Number of wins by tour
- LPGA Tour: 27
- Ladies European Tour: 1
- Epson Tour: 3

Best results in LPGA major championships (wins: 2)
- Chevron Championship: Won: 2008
- Women's PGA C'ship: T3: 2008
- U.S. Women's Open: T2: 2007
- Women's British Open: Won: 2007

Achievements and awards
- World Golf Hall of Fame: 2017 (member page)
- Futures Tour Rookie of the Year: 2002
- Futures Tour Player of the Year: 2002
- LPGA Tour Rookie of the Year: 2003
- LPGA Tour Player of the Year: 2006, 2007, 2008, 2009
- LPGA Vare Trophy: 2006, 2007, 2008, 2009
- LPGA Tour Money Winner: 2006, 2007, 2008
- Heather Farr Player Award: 2007
- Bob Jones Award: 2011
- (For a full list of awards, see here)

Lorena Ochoa Reyes (Spanish: [loˈɾena oˈtʃoa]; born 15 November 1981) is a Mexican professional golfer. She played on the U.S.-based LPGA Tour from 2003 to 2010. She was the top-ranked female golfer in the world for 158 consecutive and total weeks (the consecutive streak is an LPGA Tour record), from 23 April 2007 to her retirement on 2 May 2010, at the age of 28 years old. As the first Mexican golfer of either gender to be ranked number one in the world, because of her record, she is considered the best Mexican female golfer of all time. Ochoa was inducted into the World Golf Hall of Fame in 2017.

== Early life ==
Born and raised in Guadalajara, Ochoa was the third of four children of a real estate developer and an artist. She took up golf at the age of five, won her first state event at the age of six, and her first national event at seven.

An 11-year-old Ochoa approached the professional Rafael Alarcón, 1979 winner of the Canadian Amateur Championship, as he worked on his game at Guadalajara Country Club, where her family lived near the 10th tee. She asked him if he would help her with her game. Alarcon asked her what her goal was, "She said she wanted to be the best player in the world."

As a junior, she captured 22 state events in Guadalajara and 44 national events in Mexico. She won five consecutive titles at the Junior World Golf Championships.

== Amateur career ==
In 2000, Ochoa enrolled at the University of Arizona in the U.S. on a golf scholarship, where she was a teammate of fellow freshman Natalie Gulbis. While a student in Tucson, Ochoa received regular tutoring and greatly improved her English by watching movies and reading magazines between practice and tournaments.

She was very successful in women's collegiate golf in the next two years, winning the NCAA Player of the Year Awards for 2001 and 2002, finishing runner-up at both the 2001 and 2002 NCAA National Championship and being named to the National Golf Coaches Association (NGCA) 2001 All-America First team. She won the 2001 Pac-10 Women's Golf Championships, was named Pac-10 Freshman/Newcomer of the Year 2001 and was All-Pac-10 First team in 2001 and 2002.

In her second year she had eight tournament wins in ten events she entered and set an NCAA record with seven consecutive victories in her first seven events. She won the Golfstat Cup in both 2001 and 2002. The Cup is given to the player who has the best scoring average versus par with at least 20 full rounds played during a season. setting the single-season NCAA scoring average record as a freshman at 71.33 and beating her own record the next year by just over a stroke per round with a 70.13 average.

In November 2001, Ochoa was presented with Mexico's National Sports Award by Mexican President Vicente Fox. She was the youngest person and first golfer to receive Mexico's highest sporting accolade. In 2006, she was named NCAA Division I Women's Golf Most Outstanding Student Athlete, an award which was bestowed as part of the 25th Anniversary of Women's Championships celebration, taking into account outstanding performances over the past 25 years.

Nancy Lopez describes Ochoa off the golf course: "When you meet her for the second time [...] she remembers not only your name, but also the slightest detail from the last time you spoke."

== Professional career ==
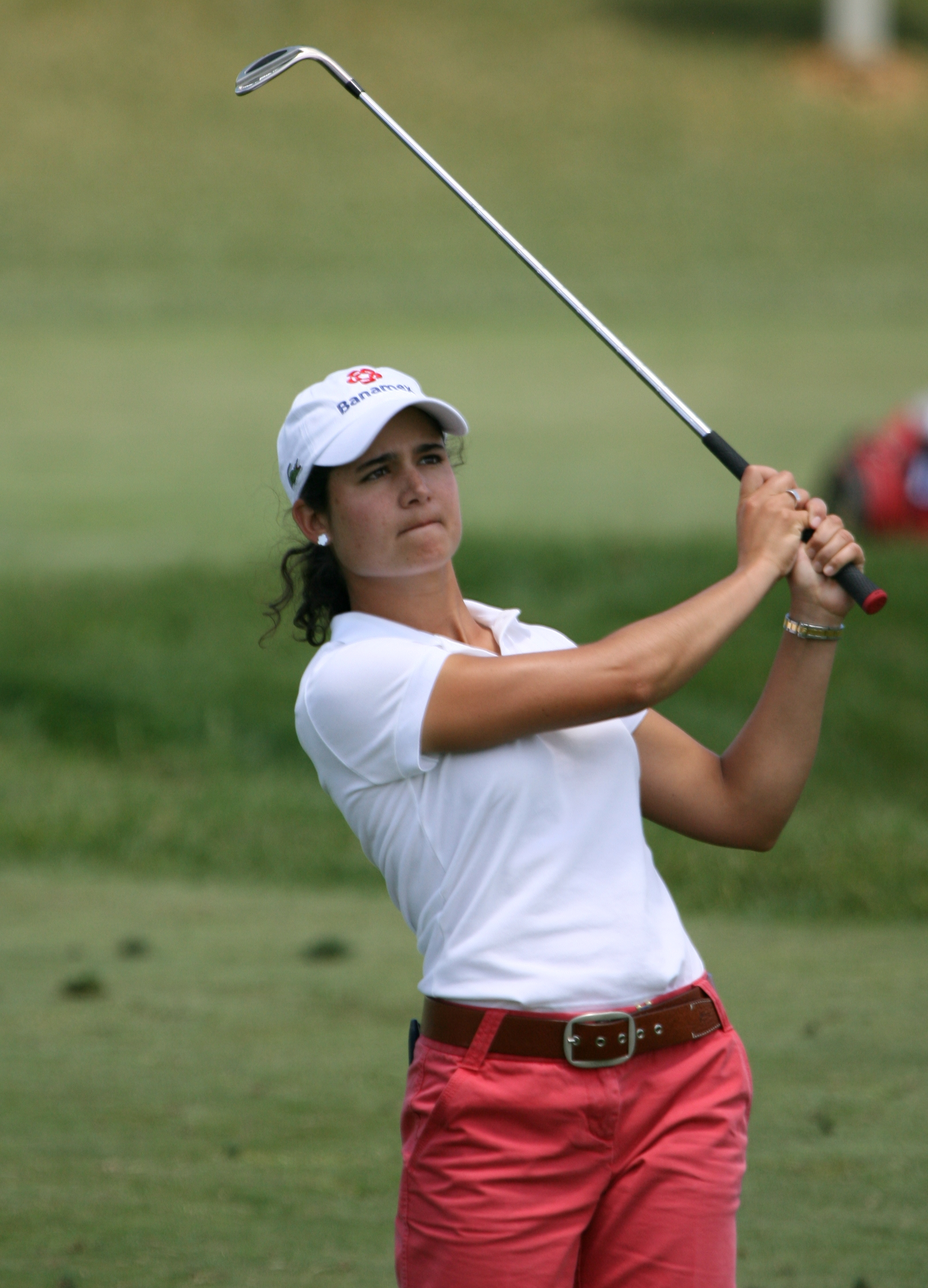
Ochoa hitting an iron shot at the 2007 LPGA Championship

Ochoa left college after her second year to turn professional, then won three of ten events played on the 2002 Futures Tour, and topped its money list to earn membership on the LPGA Tour for the 2003 season. She was also Duramed FUTURES Tour Player of the Year.

In her rookie season on the LPGA Tour in 2003, she had eight top-10 finishes, including runner-up finishes at the Wegmans Rochester and Michelob Light Open at Kingsmill, ending the season as the Louise Suggs Rolex Rookie of the Year and ninth on the LPGA official money list. In 2004, she won her first two LPGA Tour titles: the Franklin American Mortgage Championship (where she became the first Mexican born player to win on the LPGA Tour) and the Wachovia LPGA Classic. That same year she placed in the top ten in three of the four major championships.

In 2005, Ochoa won the Wegmans Rochester LPGA. In 2006, her first round score of 62 in the Kraft Nabisco Championship tied the record for lowest score ever by a golfer, male or female, in any major tournament. Her playoff loss to Karrie Webb marked her best finish until 2007 in an LPGA major. By the end of the year she won six tournaments, topped the money list and claimed her first LPGA Tour Player of the Year award which goes to the player who gains the most points throughout the season based on a formula in which points are awarded for top-10 finishes and are doubled at the LPGA's four major championships and at the season-ending ADT Championship. She also won the LPGA Vare Trophy for lowest scoring average on the LPGA Tour.

Her achievements were recognized outside the sport of golf when Ochoa won the 2006 Associated Press Female Athlete of the Year award and received the National Sports Prize for the second time.

In April 2007, Ochoa overtook Annika Sörenstam to become the world number one ranked golfer.

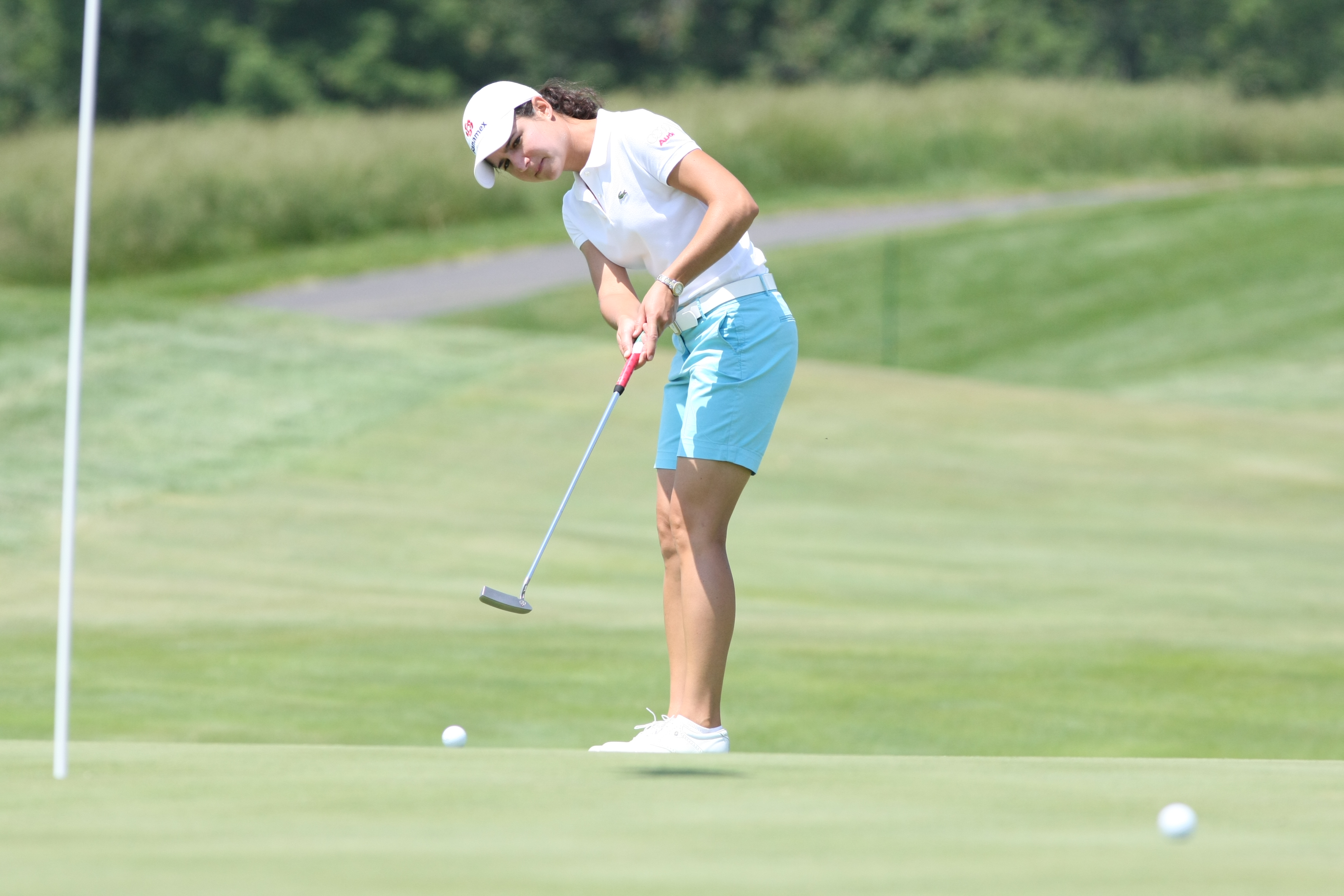
Lorena Ochoa (MEX) during pro-am before 2008 LPGA Championship held at Bulle Rock Golf Course, on 3 June 2008 in Havre de Grace, Maryland.

In August 2007, Ochoa won her first major championship at the historic home of golf, the Old Course at St Andrews, with a wire-to-wire win by four shots at the Women's British Open. She won the next two LPGA events, the CN Canadian Women's Open and the Safeway Classic, the first to win three consecutive events since Sörenstam in 2005.

Also in 2007, Ochoa became the first woman ever to earn more than $4,000,000 in a single season, surpassing Sörenstam's previous record of $2,863,904.

In April 2008, Ochoa won her second major championship, this time at the Kraft Nabisco Championship, becoming the first golfer to win consecutive LPGA majors since Sörenstam in 2005. She celebrated this victory in the traditional fashion for the Kraft Nabisco by jumping into the pond on the 18th green. The following week, she won the Corona Championship in her home country by 11 strokes. This gave her the final tournament win she needed to qualify for the World Golf Hall of Fame, although she cannot be inducted until she completes ten seasons on the LPGA Tour.

In November 2008, she became the host of a new annual LPGA event, the Lorena Ochoa Invitational, held at her original home course, Guadalajara Country Club. Proceeds from the tournament help support the Lorena Ochoa Foundation.

Ochoa was coached by Rafael Alarcón, a Mexican professional. Alarcon finished second in the 1976 Canadian Amateur Championship, won that title in 1979, then turned professional.

=== Retirement ===
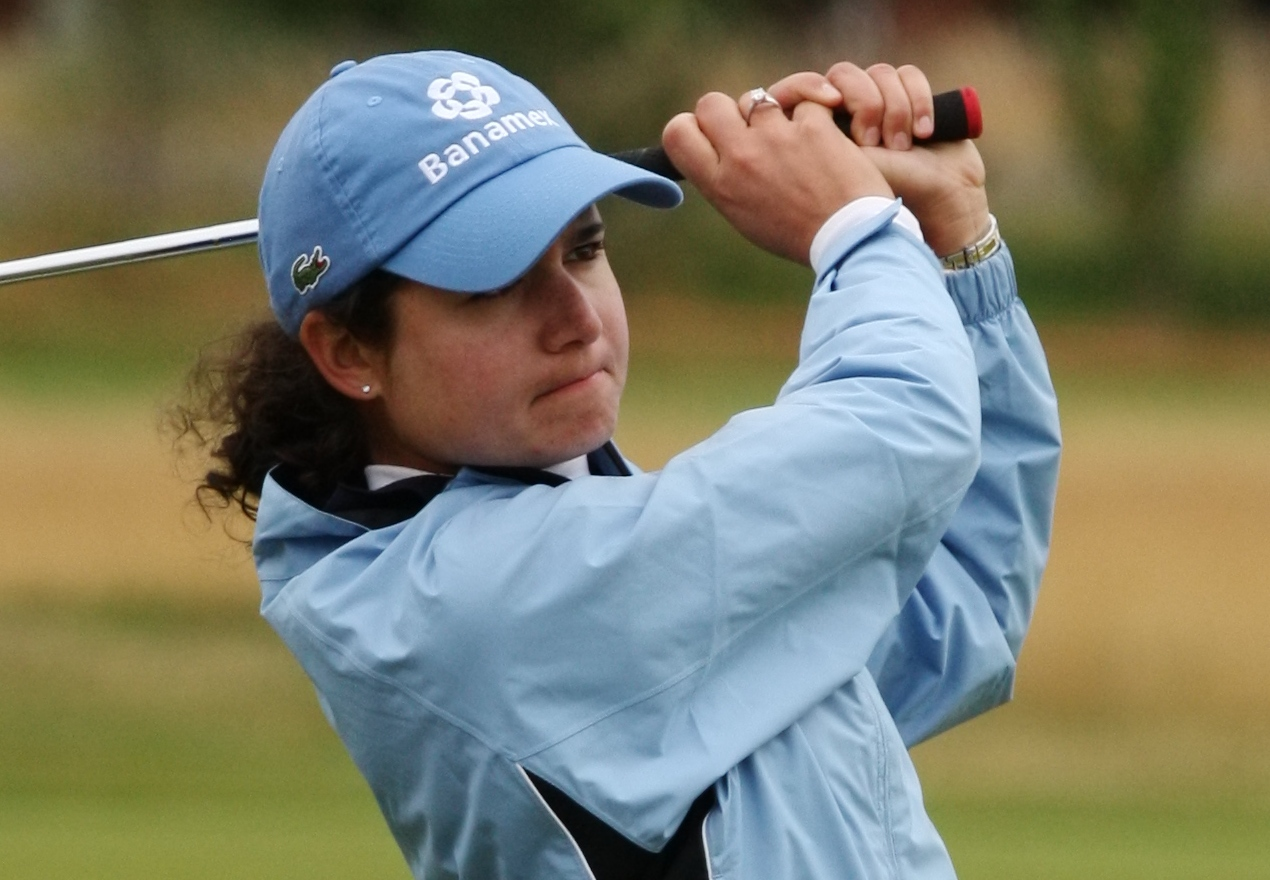
Lorena Ochoa of Mexico on the 18th fairway during last practice round before 2009 Ricoh Women's British Open held at Royal Lytham & St Annes on 29 July 2009 in Lytham St Annes, England

On 20 April 2010, Ochoa released a statement indicating her intent to retire from professional golf. At a press conference held in Mexico City on 23 April 2010, Ochoa said her last tournament would be the 2010 Tres Marias Championship to be played from 29 April through 2 May. She said that her career plan had always been to play for "around ten years" and to be the number 1 ranked player in the world. She also said:

I just want to be honest with all of you. I went to Asia, and after two or three days of being in Thailand, it was really easy to me – it was really clear to see that I didn't want to be out there, you know. I just was thinking of other things. I wanted to get home. I wanted to start working on the foundation. I wanted to be here close to my family.

Ochoa said she would still maintain her membership in the LPGA and would play in the Lorena Ochoa Invitational and "I'm going to leave the door open in case I want to come back in one or two years to play a U.S. Open or a Kraft Nabisco."

Ochoa made a limited return to competitive golf in 2012, having been invited by her sponsor, Lacoste, to compete in the Lacoste Ladies Open de France, an event on the Ladies European Tour. Ochoa finished the event in T22, 13 shots behind the winner Stacey Keating. Ochoa also announced she would compete in the 2012 edition of her own event, the Lorena Ochoa Invitational.

=== Family business ===
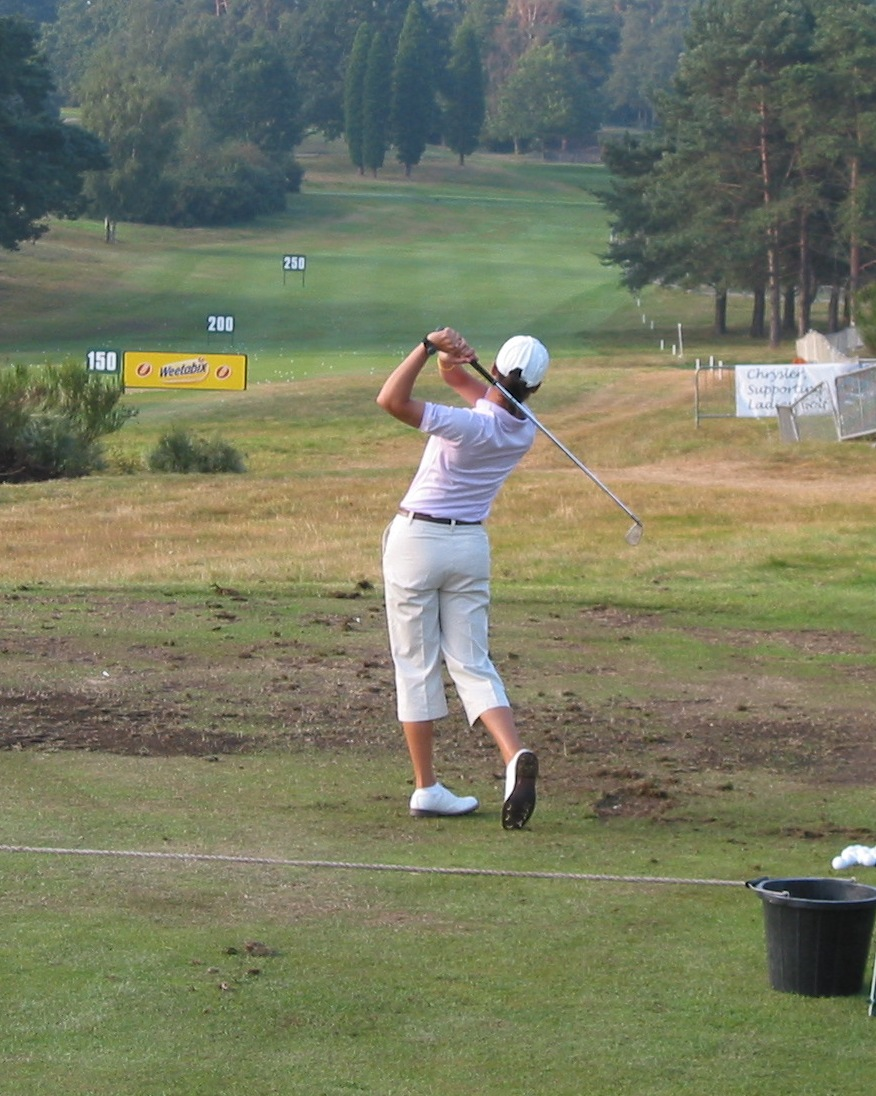
Ochoa golf swing in 2004

Lorena Ochoa's successes fuel the family business, the Ochoa Group in Guadalajara, managed by her brother Alejandro Ochoa.

Lorena Ochoa is represented by the Ochoa Sports Management, along with Alarcon and Sophia Sheridan, a Mexican golfer who plays on the LPGA's developmental tour. The Ochoas are confident the list will expand as they attempt to grow the game in Mexico through Ochoa Golf Academies, created by Lorena, Alejandro, and Alarcon.

Ochoa Sports Management also operates the LPGA Corona Championship, an annual tour stop in Morelia, Mexico; and the Lorena Ochoa Invitational.

The Lorena Ochoa Foundation operates La Barranca, a primary school in Guadalajara with 250 underprivileged students and an innovative curriculum. In 2008, the foundation opened a high school with 21 freshmen students. The plan, according to foundation director Carmen Bolio, is to add a new class each year and then construct a high school building that's separate from the primary school.

== Personal life ==
She became engaged to her boyfriend Andrés Conesa Labastida, CEO of Aeroméxico, and they married in December 2009. In April 2011, Ochoa announced she was pregnant with the couple's first child. As of mid-2017, she has 3 children.

== Awards and honors ==
- In 2002, Ochoa earned the Futures Tour Rookie of the Year honors and Player of the Year honors.
- She was the recipient of the 2003 Nancy Lopez Award, which is presented annually to the world's most outstanding female amateur golfer.
- In 2003, she earned LPGA Rookie of the Year honors.
- From 2006 - 2008, Ochoa led the LPGA's money list, earned LPGA Player of the Year honors, and earned the Vare Trophy, given to the player with the lowest scoring average.
- In 2006 and 2007, she was AP Athlete of the Year in the female category.
- In 2007, she earned the Heather Farr Player Award, an award bestowed by the LPGA given to a player who manifests strong determination, given in memory of cancer victim Heather Farr.
- In 2008 and 2009, she earned the Best International Athlete ESPY Award in the women's category
- In 2009, Ochoa again earned LPGA's Player of the Year honors and earned the Vare Trophy.
- In 2011, she earned the Bob Jones Award, the highest honor bestowed by the USGA (the United States Golf Association), given to a player who demonstrates consistent sportsmanship.
- In 2017, Ochoa was inducted into the World Golf Hall of Fame.
- In 2025, she became an honorary member of The Royal and Ancient Golf Club of St Andrews.

== Professional wins (30) ==
=== LPGA Tour wins (27) ===
Legend
LPGA Tour major championships (2)
Other LPGA Tour (25)

No.	Date	Tournament	Winning score	Margin of victory	Runner(s)-up
1	16 May 2004	Franklin American Mortgage Championship	−16 (70-67-67-68=272)	1 stroke	(United States) Wendy Ward
2	29 Aug 2004	Wachovia LPGA Classic	−19 (67-68-69-65=269)	2 strokes	(South Korea) Grace Park
3	19 Jun 2005	Wegmans Rochester LPGA	−15 (67-69-72-65=273)	4 strokes	(United States) Paula Creamer
4	15 Apr 2006	LPGA Takefuji Classic	−19 (63-68-66=197)	3 strokes	(South Korea) Seon Hwa Lee
5	21 May 2006	Sybase Classic	−5 (71-71-66=208)	2 strokes	(South Korea) Kyeong Bae (South Korea) Hee-Won Han
6	27 Aug 2006	Wendy's Championship for Children	−24 (67-68-64-65=264)	3 strokes	(South Korea) Jee Young Lee (United States) Stacy Prammanasudh
7	8 Oct 2006	Corona Morelia Championship	−20 (71-64-68-69=272)	5 strokes	(Paraguay) Julieta Granada
8	15 Oct 2006	Samsung World Championship	−16 (67-73-67-65=272)	2 strokes	(Sweden) Annika Sörenstam
9	12 Nov 2006	The Mitchell Company Tournament of Champions	−21 (66-73-63-65=267)	10 strokes	(United States) Paula Creamer (United States) Juli Inkster
10	25 Mar 2007	Safeway International	−18 (69-64-69-68=270)	2 strokes	(Norway) Suzann Pettersen
11	20 May 2007	Sybase Classic	−18 (68-67-67-68=270)	3 strokes	(South Korea) Sarah Lee
12	24 Jun 2007	Wegmans LPGA	−8 (69-71-67-73=280)	Playoff	(South Korea) In-Kyung Kim
13	5 Aug 2007	Women's British Open^{[1]}	−5 (67-73-73-74=287)	4 strokes	(Sweden) Maria Hjorth (South Korea) Jee Young Lee
14	19 Aug 2007	CN Canadian Women's Open	−16 (70-65-64-69=268)	3 strokes	(United States) Paula Creamer
15	26 Aug 2007	Safeway Classic	−12 (67-66-71=204)	5 strokes	(Sweden) Sophie Gustafson (United States) Christina Kim (Scotland) Mhairi McKay (South Korea) Inbee Park
16	14 Oct 2007	Samsung World Championship	−18 (68-67-69-66=270)	4 strokes	(South Korea) Mi-Hyun Kim
17	18 Nov 2007	ADT Championship	−4 (70-70-66-68)	2 strokes	(United States) Natalie Gulbis
18	2 Mar 2008	HSBC Women's Champions	−20 (66-65-69-68=268)	11 strokes	(Sweden) Annika Sörenstam
19	30 Mar 2008	Safeway International	−22 (65-67-68-66=266)	7 strokes	(South Korea) Jee Young Lee
20	6 Apr 2008	Kraft Nabisco Championship	−11 (68-71-71-67=277)	5 strokes	(Norway) Suzann Pettersen (Sweden) Annika Sörenstam
21	13 Apr 2008	Corona Championship	−25 (66-66-66-69=267)	11 strokes	(South Korea) Song-Hee Kim
22	20 Apr 2008	Ginn Open	−18 (68-67-65-69=269)	3 strokes	(Taiwan) Yani Tseng
23	18 May 2008	Sybase Classic	−10 (68-67-71=206)	1 stroke	(South Korea) Na Yeon Choi (Sweden) Sophie Gustafson (United States) Brittany Lang (Scotland) Catriona Matthew (United States) Morgan Pressel
24	28 Sep 2008	Navistar LPGA Classic	−15 (67-67-69-70=273)	Playoff	(United States) Cristie Kerr (United States) Candie Kung
25	1 Mar 2009	Honda LPGA Thailand	−14 (71-69-68-66=274)	3 strokes	(South Korea) Hee Young Park
26	26 Apr 2009	Corona Championship	−25 (65-65-69-68=267)	1 stroke	(Norway) Suzann Pettersen
27	4 Oct 2009	Navistar LPGA Classic	−18 (66-68-66-70=270)	4 strokes	(United States) Brittany Lang (United States) Michelle Wie

^{1} Co-sanctioned by the Ladies European Tour.

LPGA Tour playoff record (2–5)

No.	Year	Tournament	Opponent(s)	Result
1	2005	Safeway International	(Sweden) Annika Sörenstam	Lost with par on first extra hole
2	2006	SBS Open at Turtle Bay	(South Korea) Joo Mi Kim (South Korea) Soo Young Moon	Kim won with birdie on second extra hole Ochoa eliminated by birdie on first hole
3	2006	Kraft Nabisco Championship	(Australia) Karrie Webb	Lost to birdie on first extra hole
4	2007	Ginn Tribute Hosted by Annika	(United States) Nicole Castrale	Lost to par on first extra hole
5	2007	Wegmans LPGA	(South Korea) In-Kyung Kim	Won with par on second extra hole
6	2007	Longs Drugs Challenge	(Norway) Suzann Pettersen	Lost to birdie on second extra hole
7	2008	Navistar LPGA Classic	(United States) Cristie Kerr (United States) Candie Kung	Won with par on second extra hole Kerr eliminated by par on first hole

=== Futures Tour wins (3) ===
No.	Date	Tournament	Winning score	Margin of victory	Runner(s)-up
1	16 Jun 2002	JWA/Michelob Light FUTURES Charity Golf Classic	−9 (201)	4 strokes	(United States) Amy Dahle
2	30 Jun 2002	Ann Arbor FUTURES Classic	−8 (68-72-68=208)	1 stroke	(United States) Christina Kim
3	11 Aug 2002	Betty Puskar Futures Golf Classic	−9 (70-68-69=207)	2 strokes	(United States) Erika Wicoff

Futures Tour playoff record (0–1)

No.	Year	Tournament	Opponent(s)	Result
1	2002	Hewlett-Packard Garden State FUTURES Summer Classic	(United States) Christina Kim	Lost to birdie on sixth extra hole

== Major championships ==
=== Wins (2) ===
Year	Championship	Winning score	Margin	Runners-up
2007	Women's British Open	−5 (67-73-73-74=287)	4 strokes	(Sweden) Maria Hjorth, (South Korea) Jee Young Lee
2008	Kraft Nabisco Championship	−11 (68-71-71-67=277)	5 strokes	(Norway) Suzann Pettersen, (Sweden) Annika Sörenstam

=== Results timeline ===
Tournament	2000	2001	2002	2003	2004	2005	2006	2007	2008	2009	2010
Kraft Nabisco Championship		T21LA	8 LA	3	T8	T35	2	T10	1	T12	4
LPGA Championship				T20	T8	T5	T9	T6	T3	T23	
U.S. Women's Open	CUT		WD	T13	T44	T6	T20	T2	T31	T26	
Women's British Open				T24	4	CUT	T4	1	T7	T28	

Win
Top 10
Did not play

LA = low amateur
CUT = missed the half-way cut
WD = withdrew
"T" = tied

=== Summary ===
Tournament	Wins	2nd	3rd	Top-5	Top-10	Top-25	Events	Cuts made
Kraft Nabisco Championship	1	1	1	4	7	9	10	10
LPGA Championship	0	0	1	2	5	7	7	7
U.S. Women's Open	0	1	0	1	2	4	9	7
Women's British Open	1	0	0	3	4	5	7	6
Totals	2	2	2	10	18	25	33	30

- Most consecutive cuts made – 17 (2006 Kraft Nabisco – 2010 Kraft Nabisco)
- Longest streak of top-10s – 7 (2006 British Open – 2008 LPGA)

== LPGA Tour career summary ==
Year	Tournaments played	Cuts made	Wins	2nd	3rd	Top 10s	Best finish	Earnings ($)	Money list rank	Scoring average	Scoring rank
2000	1	0	0	0	0	0	CUT	n/a		76.50	
2001	2	2	0	0	0	1	T7	n/a		70.75	
2002^{1}	5	4	0	0	0	2	T5	19,080	n/a (142)	71.00	n/a (10)
2003	24	23	0	2	3	8	2	823,740	9	70.97	12
2004	27	27	2	1	5	18	1	1,450,824	3	70.02	3
2005	23	20	1	4	0	12	1	1,201,786	4	71.39	9
2006	25	25	6	6	2	21	1	2,592,872	1	69.24	1
2007	25	25	8	5	2	18	1	4,364,994	1	69.68	1
2008	22	22	7	0	2	17	1	2,763,193	1	69.70	1
2009	22	22	3	4	0	14	1	1,489,395	4	70.16	1
2010	6	6	0	0	0	2	4	176,527	53	71.92	n/a^{2}(30)
2012	1	1	0	0	0	0	T18	13,158	141	71.00	n/a
Totals	183	177	27	22	14	113	1	14,863,331	4		

^{1} The first three events of 2002 were played as an amateur; missed cut was an injury withdrawal (neck) prior to second round of the 2002 U.S. Women's Open.
^{2} Ochoa was not included in the final 2010 scoring average rankings; her final event was in early May.

== Futures Tour summary ==
Year	Tournaments played	Cuts made	Wins	2nd	3rd	Top 10s	Best finish	Earnings ($)	Money list rank	Scoring average	Scoring rank
2002	10	10	3	4	0	8	1	53,702	1	69.27	1

== Team appearances ==
Amateur

- Espirito Santo Trophy (representing Mexico): 1998, 2000

Professional

- World Cup (representing Mexico): 2005

== See also ==
- List of golfers with most LPGA Tour wins
- Statue of Lorena Ochoa, in Puerto Vallarta, Jalisco
