= 2007 in golf =

This article summarizes the highlights of professional and amateur golf in the year 2007.

== Men's professional golf ==
Major championships

- 5–8 April: The Masters - American Zach Johnson won his first major tournament, in a high scoring week at Augusta.
- 14–17 June: U.S. Open - Ángel Cabrera became Argentina's first U.S. Open winner, claiming a victory by one stroke.
- 19–22 July: Open Championship - Pádraig Harrington became the first European major winner of the 21st century, defeating Sergio García in a playoff.
- 9–12 August: PGA Championship - Tiger Woods won his fourth PGA Championship and 13th major.

World Golf Championships

- 19–25 February: WGC-Accenture Match Play Championship - Swede Henrik Stenson defeated defending champion Geoff Ogilvy 2 and 1. Stenson moved up to fifth in the world rankings, the highest position ever attained by a Swedish male golfer. For the first time at this event no American made the final, and Chad Campbell was the only American quarterfinalist. He finished fourth after losing the playoff match to Trevor Immelman of South Africa.
- 22–25 March WGC-CA Championship - Tiger Woods won the event for the third consecutive year, and for the sixth time in his career.
- 2–5 August: WGC-Bridgestone Invitational - Tiger Woods repeated his CA Championship success and won the event for the third consecutive year.

FedEx Cup playoff events

- 23–26 August: The Barclays - Steve Stricker won by two shots and took the FedEx Cup points lead.
- 31 August-3 September: Deutsche Bank Championship - Phil Mickelson won by two shots and took the FedEx Cup points lead.
- 6–9 September: BMW Championship - Tiger Woods won his 60th PGA Tour event by 2 strokes over Aaron Baddeley.
- 13–16 September: The Tour Championship - Woods won his 61st PGA Tour event, running away with the tournament on an easier-than-normal East Lake Golf Club in Atlanta by 8 shots over Mark Calcavecchia and Zach Johnson. Woods also won the FedEx Cup as season champion, collecting a $10 million retirement account deposit as FedEx Cup champion in addition to the $1.26 million first prize for the tournament.

Other leading PGA Tour events

- 10–13 May: The Players Championship - American Phil Mickelson won his first Players Championship with a final round 3-under-par 69. It was the 31st win of Mickelson's career.

For a complete list of PGA Tour results see PGA Tour.

Other leading European Tour events

- 24–27 May: BMW PGA Championship - Anders Hansen from Denmark won the event after holing a 25-foot birdie putt in a sudden-death playoff against England’s Justin Rose.
- 14–17 October: HSBC World Match Play Championship - South African Ernie Els defeated Ángel Cabrera by a score of 6&4 to win this tournament for the 7th time.
- 1–4 November: Volvo Masters - Justin Rose won in a playoff to overtake Ernie Els for the Order of Merit.

For a complete list of European Tour results see 2007 European Tour.

Team events

- 27–30 September: Presidents Cup - The United States defeated the International team by a score of 19½ to 14½.
- 27–30 September: Seve Trophy - Great Britain and Ireland defeated Continental Europe by the score of 16½ to 11 ½.
- 22–25 November: 2007 Omega Mission Hills World Cup - Scotland's Colin Montgomerie and Marc Warren, who were runners-up in 2006, defeat Boo Weekley and Heath Slocum of the USA in the third hole of a playoff.

Tour leaders

- PGA Tour - Tiger Woods headed the PGA Tour money list for the eighth time, and also won the inaugural FedEx Cup.
- European Tour - Justin Rose won his first Order of Merit becoming the youngest winner since Ronan Rafferty in 1989.
- Japan Golf Tour - Toru Taniguchi topped the money list for the second time with earnings of ¥171,744,498.
- Asian Tour - Liang Wenchong became the first golfer from mainland China to win the Order of Merit.
- PGA Tour of Australasia - Craig Parry won the Order of Merit for the third time, with earnings of A$422,004.
- Sunshine Tour - With a change to a calendar based season, there were two Order of Merit winners on the Sunshine Tour during 2007, with tournaments held from 1 January 2007 to 25 February 2007 counting for both the 2006/07 and 2007 lists. The 2006/07 Order of Merit was headed by Charl Schwartzel of South Africa for the third consecutive season with earnings of R1,585,117.41, although Ernie Els was the leading money winner, but had not played in sufficient events to qualify for the Order of Merit. The 2007 Order of Merit was won by another South African, James Kingston with earnings of R1,980,688.65.

Other happenings

- 4 January: The first shot of the first FedEx Cup was hit at the Mercedes-Benz Championship in Hawaii.
- 12 January: Sixteen-year-old Tadd Fujikawa became the youngest player in 50 years to make the cut at a PGA Tour event after shooting rounds of 71 and 66 at the Sony Open in Hawaii. He went on to finish tied for 20th in the tournament. Fujikawa qualified for the Sony Open by shooting 67 in the Aloha Section PGA qualifying event.
- 1 April: 20-year-old Spaniard Pablo Martin-Benavides became the first amateur golfer to win a European Tour event, at the Estoril Open de Portugal.
- 5 April: Jeev Milkha Singh was the first Indian golfer to participate in the Masters.
- 20 May: 15-year-old amateur Ryo Ishikawa won the Munsingwear Open KSB Cup on the Japan Golf Tour.
- 15 July: Daniel Summerhays became the first amateur player to win a Nationwide Tour event at the Nationwide Children's Hospital Invitational.
- 30 November: Sir Bob Charles made the cut at the Michael Hill New Zealand Open at the age of 71 and became the oldest golfer to make a cut on a European Tour event.

Awards

- PGA Tour
  - FedEx Cup – Tiger Woods
  - Player of the Year (Jack Nicklaus Trophy) - Tiger Woods
  - Leading money winner (Arnold Palmer Award) - Tiger Woods
  - Vardon Trophy - Tiger Woods
  - Byron Nelson Award - Tiger Woods
  - Rookie of the year - Brandt Snedeker
  - Comeback Player of the Year - Steve Stricker
- Champions Tour
  - Player of the Year - Jay Haas
  - Rookie of the Year - Denis Watson
  - Comeback Player of the Year - R. W. Eaks
- Nationwide Tour
  - Player of the Year - Nick Flanagan
- European Tour
  - Player of the Year - Pádraig Harrington
  - Rookie of the Year - Martin Kaymer

Other tour results

- 2007 Asian Tour
- 2007 PGA Tour of Australasia
- 2007 Canadian Tour
- 2007 Challenge Tour
- 2007 Japan Golf Tour
- 2007 Nationwide Tour
- 2007 Tour de las Americas

== Women's professional golf ==
LPGA majors

- 29 March-1 April: Kraft Nabisco Championship - American Morgan Pressel claimed a one-shot victory to win her first tournament and became the youngest ever winner of an LPGA major.
- 7–10 June: LPGA Championship - Norwegian Suzann Pettersen won the LPGA Championship, her first major championship, by one stroke over Karrie Webb.
- 28 June-1 July: U.S. Women's Open - American Cristie Kerr won her first major championship and tenth LPGA Tour title.
- 2–5 August: Ricoh Women's British Open - World number one Lorena Ochoa from Mexico won her first major championship.

Ladies European Tour major (in addition to the Women's British Open)

- 25–28 July: Evian Masters - American Natalie Gulbis won as a professional for the first time, beating Jeong Jang in a sudden-death playoff.

For a complete list of Ladies European Tour results see Ladies European Tour.

Additional LPGA Tour events

- 17–22 July: HSBC Women's World Match Play Championship - Seon Hwa Lee beat Ai Miyazato 2&1 for her second career victory.
- 15–18 November: LPGA Playoffs at The ADT - Lorena Ochoa emerged as the winner from a 32-player field to win the $1 million prize and raise her season earnings to just under $5 million.

For a complete list of LPGA Tour results see LPGA Tour.

Team events

- 19–21 January: Women's World Cup of Golf - Julieta Granada and Celeste Troche, representing Paraguay, won the event, held in Sun City, South Africa.
- 14–16 September: Solheim Cup - Team USA successfully defended its title, beating Europe 16 to 12 in Halmstad, Sweden, winning the Solheim Cup on foreign soil for the first time since 1996.
- 7–9 December: Lexus Cup - Team Asia took a commanding lead, winning all six matches on day one and won the event for the second consecutive year over Team International, 15-9.

Money list leaders

- LPGA Tour - Lorena Ochoa led the list with $4,364,994, becoming the first player in LPGA history to earn more than $3 million in a season.
- Ladies European Tour - Sophie Gustafson topped the Order of Merit list with earnings of 222,081.47 euros.
- Duramed Futures Tour - Emily Bastel of the United States topped the money list with earnings of $59,779.
- LPGA of Korea Tour - Jiyai Shin led the money list for the second consecutive year.
- LPGA of Japan Tour - Momoko Ueda claimed the LPGA of Japan Tour money list title, at age 21 the youngest player ever to hold the title.
- Ladies Asian Golf Tour - Da-Ye Na of Korea led the money list with US$44,500 in earnings.
- ALPG Tour - Karrie Webb of Australia topped the 2006/07 money list with A$195,000 in earnings.

Awards

- LPGA Tour Player of the Year – (Mexico) Lorena Ochoa
- LPGA Tour Rookie of the Year – (Brazil) Angela Park
- LPGA Tour Vare Trophy – (Mexico) Lorena Ochoa
- LET Player of the Year – (Germany) Bettina Hauert
- LET Rookie of the Year – (Sweden) Louise Stahle

Other happenings

- 23 April: Lorena Ochoa took over first place in the Women's World Golf Rankings, overtaking Annika Sörenstam, who held the top position for 60 weeks, since the Rankings were introduced in February 2006.
- 29 April: Silvia Cavalleri won the Corona Championship, becoming the first Italian to win a tournament on the LPGA Tour.
- 16 July: The LPGA announced that it had acquired the Duramed Futures Tour effective immediately.

== Senior men's professional golf ==
Senior majors

- 24–27 May: Senior PGA Championship - Zimbabwean Denis Watson shot a final round 68 for his first major victory.
- 5–8 July: U.S. Senior Open - American Brad Bryant shot a final round 68 to win his first major; third-round leader Tom Watson went 8-over-par in the final 8 holes, including 3 double bogeys.
- 26–29 July: Senior British Open - American Tom Watson shot a final round 73 (+2) to win his fifth Senior Major and third Senior British Open.
- 23–26 August: JELD-WEN Tradition - Zimbabwean/Irishman Mark McNulty shot a final round 68 for his first major victory.
- 4–7 October: Senior Players Championship - American Loren Roberts shot 67-66-67-67=267 (-13) to win his third major. He was victorious by six strokes.

Full list of 2007 Champions Tour results.
Full list of 2007 European Seniors Tour results.

Money list leaders

- Champions Tour - Jay Haas topped the money list for the second straight year with earnings of US$2,581,001 - Final money list
- European Seniors Tour - Carl Mason headed the Order of Merit for the third time. Final Order of Merit list

== Amateur golf ==
- 22–25 May: NCAA Division I Women's Golf Championships - Duke University won the team championship for the third consecutive year. Stacy Lewis of the University of Arkansas won the individual title.
- 30 May-2 June: NCAA Division I Men's Golf Championships - Stanford won the team championship, its eighth and first since 1994. Jamie Lovemark of Southern California won the individual title.
- 18–23 June: The Amateur Championship - Drew Weaver of the United States defeated Tim Stewart of Australia, 2 & 1.
- 6–12 August: U.S. Women's Amateur - Maria José Uribe of Colombia defeated Amanda Blumenherst of the United States, 1 up.
- 20–26 August: U.S. Amateur - Colt Knost of the United States defeated fellow American Michael Thompson, 2 & 1. Knost, who won the 2007 U.S. Amateur Public Links on 14 July, became only the second man to win both the U.S. Amateur Public Links and U.S. Amateur in the same year, and only the sixth person to win two USGA individual championships in the same year.
- 8–9 September: Walker Cup - The United States defeated Great Britain & Ireland 12½ to 11½.

Other happenings

- 23 January: The R&A published the first edition of the men's World Amateur Golf Ranking, which was topped by Richie Ramsay of Scotland.

== World Golf Hall of Fame inductees ==
The following individuals were inducted into the World Golf Hall of Fame on 12 November:

- (Republic of Ireland) Joe Carr (Lifetime Achievement)
- (United States) Hubert Green (Veterans)
- (United States) Charles B. Macdonald (Lifetime Achievement)
- (Australia) Kel Nagle (Veterans)
- (South Korea) Se Ri Pak (LPGA point system)
- (United States) Curtis Strange (PGA Tour)

== Table of results ==
This table summarises all the results referred to above in date order.

Dates	Tournament	Status or tour	Winner
19-21 Jan	Women's World Cup of Golf	Professional world team championship	Paraguay
19-25 Feb	WGC-Accenture Match Play Championship	World Golf Championships	(Sweden) Henrik Stenson
22-25 Mar	WGC-CA Championship	World Golf Championships	(United States) Tiger Woods
29 Mar-1 Apr	Kraft Nabisco Championship	LPGA major	(United States) Morgan Pressel
5-8 Apr	The Masters	Men's major	(United States) Zach Johnson
10–13 May	The Players Championship	PGA Tour	(United States) Phil Mickelson
22–25 May	NCAA Division I Women's Golf Championships	U.S. college championship	Duke / Stacy Lewis
24–27 May	BMW PGA Championship	European Tour	(Denmark) Anders Hansen
24–27 May	Senior PGA Championship	Senior major	(Zimbabwe) Denis Watson
30 May-2 Jun	NCAA Division I Men's Golf Championships	U.S. college championship	Stanford / Jamie Lovemark
7-10 Jun	LPGA Championship	LPGA major	(Norway) Suzann Pettersen
14-17 Jun	U.S. Open	Men's major	(Argentina) Ángel Cabrera
18-23 Jun	The Amateur Championship	Amateur men's individual tournament	(United States) Drew Weaver
28 Jun-1 Jul	U.S. Women's Open	LPGA major	(United States) Cristie Kerr
5-8 Jul	U.S. Senior Open	Senior major	(United States) Brad Bryant
19-22 Jul	The Open Championship	Men's major	(Republic of Ireland) Pádraig Harrington
19-22 Jul	HSBC Women's World Match Play Championship	LPGA Tour	(South Korea) Seon Hwa Lee
26-29 Jul	Evian Masters	Ladies European Tour major and LPGA Tour regular event	(United States) Natalie Gulbis
26-29 Jul	Senior British Open	Senior major	(United States) Tom Watson
2-5 Aug	WGC-Bridgestone Invitational	World Golf Championships	(United States) Tiger Woods
2-5 Aug	Women's British Open	LPGA and Ladies European Tour major	(Mexico) Lorena Ochoa
6-12 Aug	U.S. Women's Amateur	Amateur women's individual tournament	(Colombia) Maria José Uribe
9-12 Aug	PGA Championship	Men's major	(United States) Tiger Woods
16-19 Aug	JELD-WEN Tradition	Senior major	(Zimbabwe) Mark McNulty
20-26 Aug	U.S. Amateur	Amateur men's individual tournament	(United States) Colt Knost
23-26 Aug	The Barclays	PGA Tour FedEx Cup playoff	(United States) Steve Stricker
31 Aug-3 Sep	Deutsche Bank Championship	PGA Tour FedEx Cup playoff	(United States) Phil Mickelson
6-9 Sep	BMW Championship	PGA Tour FedEx Cup playoff	(United States) Tiger Woods
8-9 Sep	Walker Cup	Great Britain & Ireland v United States men's amateur team event	United States
13-16 Sep	The Tour Championship	PGA Tour FedEx Cup playoff	(United States) Tiger Woods
14-16 Sep	Solheim Cup	United States v Europe women's professional team event	United States
27-30 Sep	Presidents Cup	International Team v United States men's professional team event	United States
27-30 Sep	Seve Trophy	Great Britain & Ireland v Europe men's professional team event	(United Kingdom) Great Britain & (Republic of Ireland) Ireland
4-7 Oct	Senior Players Championship	Senior major	(United States) Loren Roberts
11-14 Oct	HSBC World Match Play Championship	European Tour	(South Africa) Ernie Els
1-4 Nov	Volvo Masters	European Tour	(England) Justin Rose
15-18 Nov	LPGA Playoffs at The ADT	LPGA Tour	(Mexico) Lorena Ochoa
22-25 Nov	Omega Mission Hills World Cup	Professional world team championship	Scotland
7-9 Dec	Lexus Cup	Asia v International Team women's professional team event	Asia

The following biennial events will next be played in 2008: Ryder Cup, Curtis Cup, Espirito Santo Trophy.
