= Morgan Pressel =

American professional golfer (born 1988)

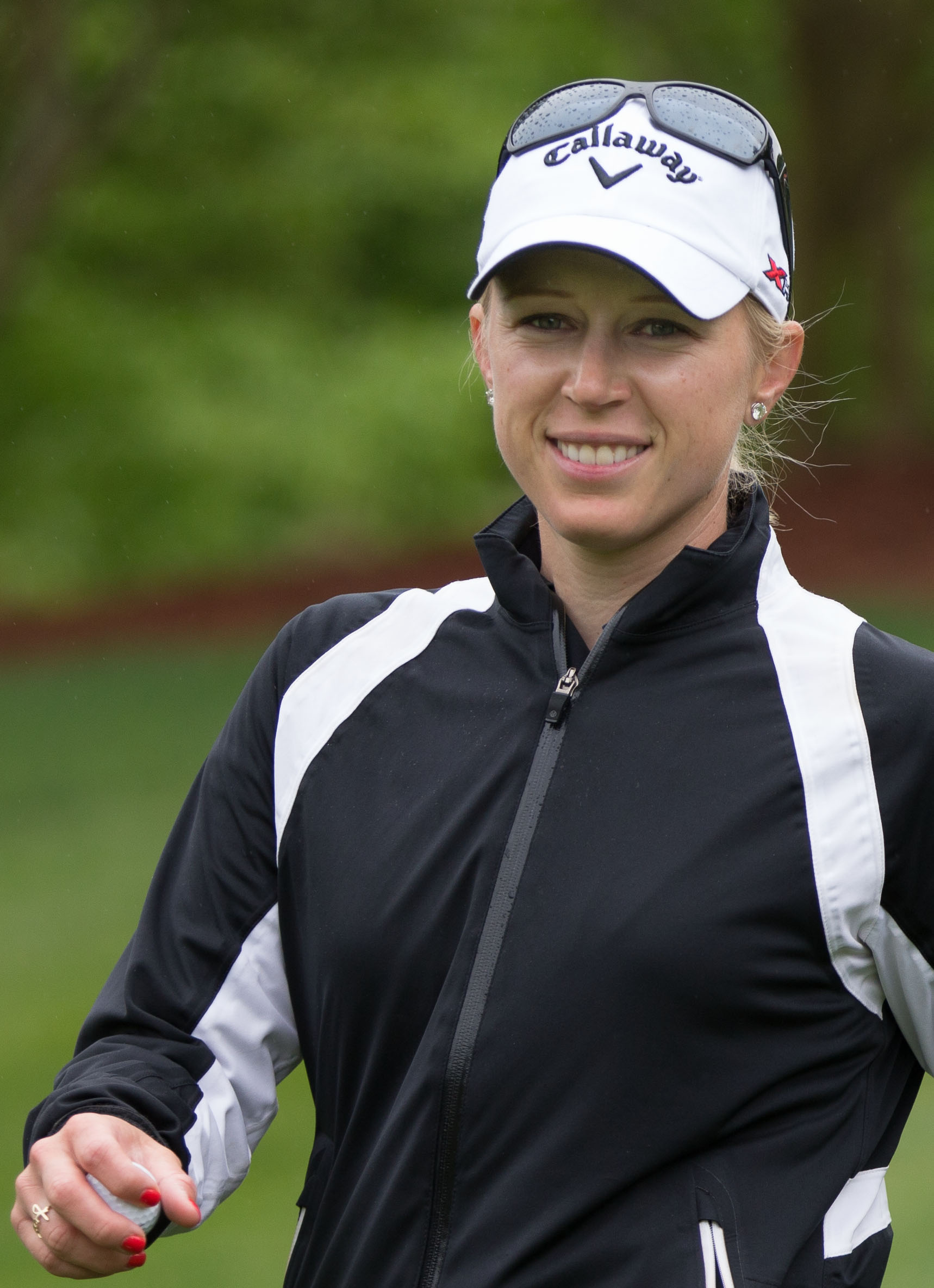
- Pressel in 2013

Personal information
- Full name: Morgan Lee Pressel
- Nationality: United States
- Born: May 23, 1988 (age 38) Tampa, Florida, U.S.
- Height: 5 ft 5 in (1.65 m)
- Spouse: Andrew Bush (m. 2013)

Career
- Sport: Golf
- Turned professional: 2005
- Former tour: LPGA Tour (2006–2021}
- Professional wins: 4

Number of wins by tour
- LPGA Tour: 2
- LPGA of Japan Tour: 1
- Other: 1

Best results in LPGA major championships (wins: 1)
- Chevron Championship: Won: 2007
- Women's PGA C'ship: 2nd: 2011
- U.S. Women's Open: T2: 2005
- Women's British Open: T4/4th: 2013, 2019
- Evian Championship: T11: 2015

Achievements and awards
- AJGA Player of the Year: 2005
- AJGA Nancy Lopez Award: 2006

Morgan Pressel (born May 23, 1988) is an American professional golfer and golf commentator who played on the LPGA Tour. In 2001, as a 12-year-old, she became the youngest player to qualify for the U.S. Women's Open. She was the 2005 American Junior Golf Association (AJGA) Player of the Year, and won the 2006 AJGA Nancy Lopez Award. She turned pro at age 17, and is the youngest-ever winner of a modern LPGA major championship, when at age 18 she won the 2007 Kraft Nabisco Championship (now known as the Chevron Championship) and vaulted to a career-high fourth in the world rankings. In early March 2021, she announced she had joined the Golf Channel and NBC Sports to be an analyst and on-course reporter in the 2021 season, while continuing to compete.

== Childhood and family life ==
Born in Tampa, Florida, to Mike Pressel and Kathy Krickstein Pressel, she attended Banyan Creek Elementary School, Omni Middle School, and graduated in 2006 from the Saint Andrew's School in Boca Raton, a private school affiliated with the Episcopal Church. She has stated that her Jewish faith plays a large role in her life.

Following her mother's death from breast cancer in September 2003, 15-year-old Pressel moved in with her maternal grandparents, Evelyn and Herb Krickstein, at St. Andrews Country Club in Boca Raton, Florida. Her two younger siblings stayed with their father. Her grandfather, a retired physician and pathologist, is also her coach. The Kricksteins' son and Pressel's uncle is former professional tennis player Aaron Krickstein.

Pressel's younger sister Madison played collegiate golf for the University of Texas and won on the Symetra Tour in 2014.

In January 2013, Pressel married Andy Bush, a senior vice president at Octagon Global Events. The two met at a pro-am event in 2007.

== Amateur career ==
In 2001, as a 12-year-old, she became the youngest player to qualify for the U.S. Women's Open. This record stood until 2007, when Lexi Thompson beat the record by several months.

At the age of 17, she was one of three co-leaders starting the final round of the 2005 U.S. Women's Open at Cherry Hills in suburban Denver. Pressel was tied for first on the 18th fairway when Birdie Kim holed out from the bunker just ahead to secure a one-stroke lead. Pressel then needed a birdie to tie, but made a bogey on the 18th to lose by two strokes. Her second-place finish gave her a share of the low amateur honors with Brittany Lang. Pressel played in a total of seven LPGA events in 2005 and made the cut in all of them, with a scoring average of 70.96 in 28 rounds.

In 2005, Pressel lost to Yani Tseng at 39th hole during the North and South Women's Amateur at Pinehurst, but won the most important amateur event, the U.S. Women's Amateur. Pressel also finished her amateur career as 2005 Girls Rolex Junior Player of the Year.

During her amateur career, she won 10 AJGA titles, including all five AJGA Invitationals: the "AJGA Slam".

- 2002 round of 16, U.S. Girls' Junior
- 2002 Junior Solheim Cup Team
- 2004 quarterfinalist, U.S. Women's Amateur
- 2004 quarterfinalist, round of 16, U.S. Girls' Junior
- 2004 Won – North and South Women's Amateur
- 2005 Won – U.S. Women's Amateur
- 2005 2nd place – North and South Amateur
- 2005 Girls Rolex Junior Player of the Year
- 2005 round of 16, U.S. Girls' Junior
- 2005 Junior Solheim Cup Team

== Professional career ==
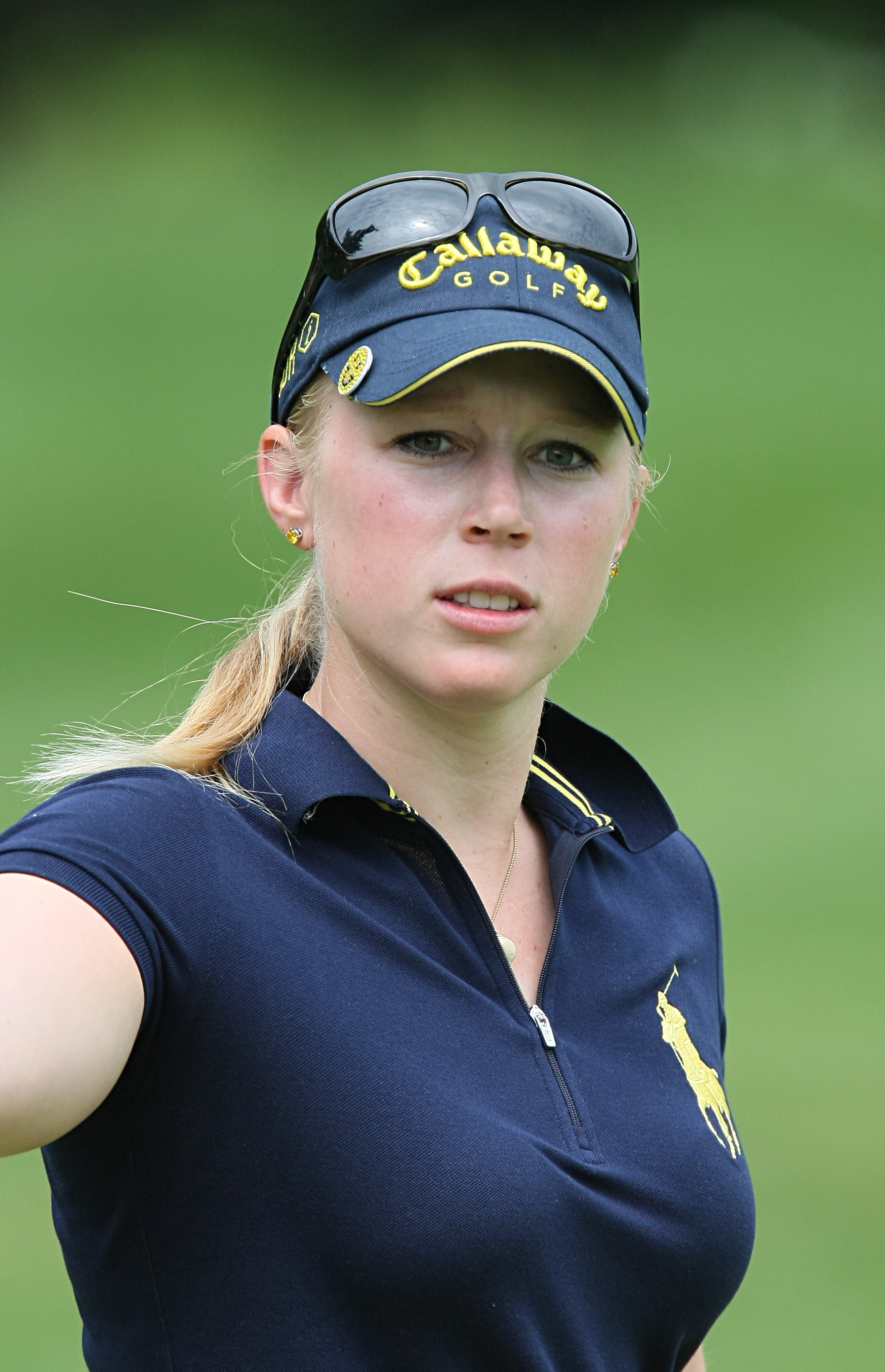
Pressel in June 2009

Pressel finished sixth in the first stage of the LPGA Qualifying Tournament in September 2005 and advanced to the final stage in December. She turned professional in November, after appealing to the LPGA to become a member as a 17-year-old. LPGA rules state that members must be 18 years old. At the five-round Final Qualifying Tournament in Daytona Beach, she finished tied for sixth to earn her tour card for 2006. She played part-time on the tour until her high school graduation in May 2006.

Pressel earned her first victory in 2007 at the Kraft Nabisco Championship and became the youngest-ever winner of a modern LPGA major at 18 years, 313 days, a record that would stand until Lydia Ko won the 2015 Evian Championship at the age of 18 years, 4 months and 20 days. On her flight home to Florida after her win, Pressel had her golf clubs stolen. The win moved her from 17th in the world rankings to fourth.

Pressel made her first hole-in-one as a professional golfer on July 15, 2007, at the Jamie Farr Owens Corning Classic at Highland Meadows Golf Club in Sylvania, Ohio. It was a 148-yard (135 m) par 3 – hole 6 for the tournament. It was not enough to win, though; Se Ri Pak won the event for the fifth time.

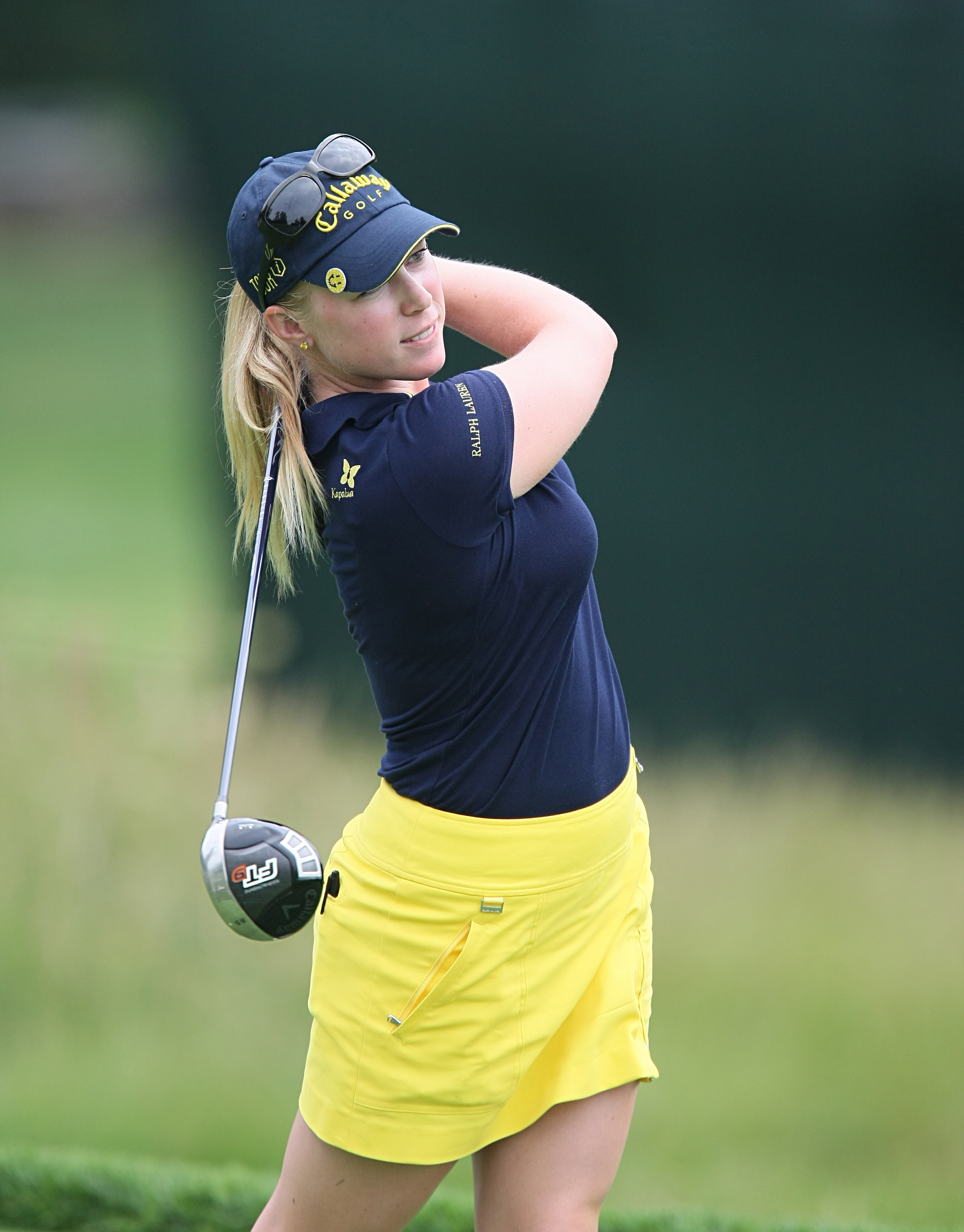
Pressel in 2009

Pressel qualified for the 2007, 2009 and 2011 Solheim Cup teams; earning a spot on the 2007 team in her second full-year on the LPGA Tour as a 19-year-old. Through 2011, she was undefeated (3–0–0) in Solheim Cup singles play.

In the 2012 Sybase Match Play Championship, Pressel was in contention for her third LPGA Tour victory in the semi-finals when she was 2 up after 11 holes to opponent Azahara Muñoz. Pressel won the 12th hole but a slow play penalty resulted in the loss of the hole instead. She would lose the match and Muñoz went on to win the tournament.

On April 26, 2015, Pressel came in second at the Swinging Skirts LPGA Classic in San Francisco. She and Lydia Ko finished at 8-under-par 280 with Ko making a birdie on the par-5 closing hole while Pressel missed a birdie effort to end the tournament. Ko won on the second playoff hole. Pressel's last victory was in 2008 at the Kapalua LPGA Classic.

She is represented by Wasserman Media Group and has endorsement deals with Callaway Golf, Polo Ralph Lauren, Royal Bank of Canada, and Audemars Piguet.

== Professional wins (4) ==
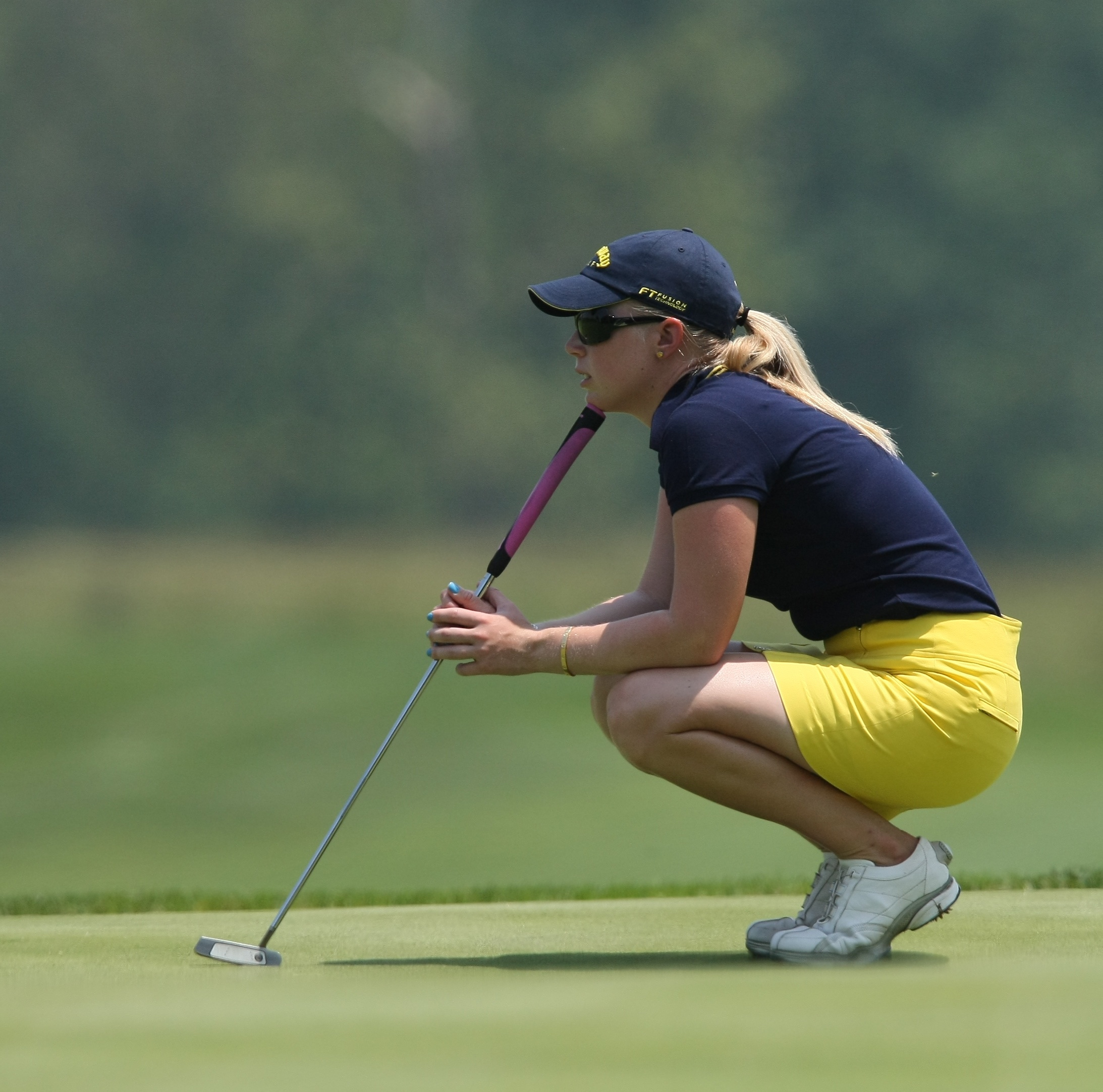
Pressel in 2009

=== LPGA Tour wins (2) ===
Legend
Major championships (1)
Other LPGA Tour (1)

No.	Date	Tournament	Winning score	To par	Margin of victory	Runner(s)-up	Winner's share ($)
1	Apr 1, 2007	Kraft Nabisco Championship	74-72-70-69=285	−3	1 stroke	(United States) Brittany Lincicome (Scotland) Catriona Matthew (Norway) Suzann Pettersen	300,000
2	Oct 19, 2008	Kapalua LPGA Classic	72-72-67-69=280	−8	1 stroke	(Norway) Suzann Pettersen	225,000

LPGA Tour playoff record (0–2)

No.	Year	Tournament	Opponent	Result
1	2009	Jamie Farr Owens Corning Classic	(South Korea) Eunjung Yi	Lost to birdie on first extra hole
2	2015	Swinging Skirts LPGA Classic	(New Zealand) Lydia Ko	Lost to birdie on second extra hole

=== LPGA of Japan Tour wins (1) ===
- 2010 (1) World Ladies Championship Salonpas Cup

=== Other wins (1) ===
- 2012 (1) CVS Caremark Charity Classic (with Jay Haas), unofficial event

== Major championships ==
=== Wins (1) ===
No.	Year	Championship	Winning score	Margin of victory	Runners-up
1	2007	Kraft Nabisco Championship	−3 (74-72-70-69=285)	1 stroke	(United States) Brittany Lincicome, (Scotland) Catriona Matthew, (Norway) Suzann Pettersen

=== Results timeline ===
Results not in chronological order before 2019.

Tournament	2001	2002	2003	2004	2005	2006	2007	2008	2009	2010
ANA Inspiration					T19	T13	1	T38	T40	T19
U.S. Women's Open	CUT		52		T2TLA	T28	T10	T17	T13	T34
Women's PGA Championship						69	14	T6	CUT	T7
Women's British Open						T56	CUT	CUT	T42	8

Tournament	2011	2012	2013	2014	2015	2016	2017	2018	2019	2020	2021
ANA Inspiration	T3	T46	T52	T11	3	CUT	T42	T72	T44	CUT	CUT
U.S. Women's Open	T21	WD	T20	CUT	T5	71	CUT		T50	CUT	
Women's PGA Championship	2	T45	T3	CUT	T5	CUT	CUT	CUT	CUT	CUT	
The Evian Championship ^			T31	T41	T11	CUT	T18	T26	CUT	NT	
Women's British Open	T49	T43	T4	T21	CUT	CUT	T49		4	T59	

^ The Evian Championship was added as a major in 2013

Win
Top 10
Did not play

LA = low amateur
CUT = missed the half-way cut
WD = withdrew
NT = no tournament
T = tied

=== Summary ===
Tournament	Wins	2nd	3rd	Top-5	Top-10	Top-25	Events	Cuts made
ANA Inspiration	1	0	2	3	3	7	17	14
U.S. Women's Open	0	1	0	2	3	7	17	12
Women's PGA Championship	0	1	1	3	5	6	15	8
The Evian Championship	0	0	0	0	0	2	7	5
Women's British Open	0	0	0	2	3	4	14	10
Totals	1	2	3	10	14	26	70	49

- Most consecutive cuts made – 12 (2009 U.S. Open – 2012 LPGA)
- Longest streak of top-10s – 3 (2015 ANA – 2015 U.S. Open)

== LPGA Tour career summary ==
Year	Tournaments played	Cuts made*	Wins	2nd	3rd	Top 10s	Best finish	Earnings ($)	Money list rank	Scoring average	Scoring rank
2001	1	0	0	0	0	0	CUT	n/a		77.00	
2003	1	1	0	0	0	0	52	n/a		76.00	
2005	7	7	0	1	0	2	T2	n/a		70.96	
2006	23	21	0	0	1	9	3	465,685	24	71.51	20
2007	25	23	1	1	3	8	1	972,452	9	71.34	6
2008	26	21	1	1	0	5	1	711,261	24	72.04	42
2009	24	21	0	2	0	5	2	630,313	22	71.38	29
2010	23	22	0	1	0	7	T2	767,455	13	71.05	11
2011	22	20	0	1	1	7	2	845,466	13	71.34	14
2012	23	15	0	0	1	1	3	271,548	45	73.65	98
2013	24	18	0	0	1	3	T3	504,188	28	71.70	33
2014	29	24	0	0	0	4	4	508,534	35	71.31	22
2015	27	22	0	1	2	6	2	962,794	11	71.42	30
2016	24	18	0	2	0	2	T2	386,672	48	72.21	77
2017	26	17	0	0	0	0	T15	195,000	78	72.32	113
2018	21	14	0	0	0	1	T7	137,346	90	71.92	75
2019	26	18	0	0	1	6	T3	610,872	36	71.37	57
2020	15	8	0	0	0	0	T15	77,513	93	72.96	104
2021	4	2	0	0	0	1	T8	49,271	136	72.00	n/a
Totals^	361	292	2	10	10	66^	1	8,096,370	35		

^ Official through 2021 season.
*Includes matchplay and other tournaments without a cut.

== World ranking ==
Position in Women's World Golf Rankings at the end of each calendar year.

Year	World ranking	Source
2006	25	
2007	12	
2008	19	
2009	23	
2010	17	
2011	16	
2012	38	
2013	47	
2014	52	
2015	24	
2016	55	
2017	127	
2018	180	
2019	53	
2020	90	
2021	179	

Pressel's career-high in the world rankings is fourth, in the spring of 2007.

== Team appearances ==
Amateur

- Junior Solheim Cup (representing the United States): 2002 (winners), 2005 (winners)

Professional

- Solheim Cup (representing the United States): 2007 (winners), 2009 (winners), 2011, 2013, 2015 (winners), 2019
- Lexus Cup (representing International team): 2006, 2007

=== Solheim Cup record ===
Year	Total matches	Total W–L–H	Singles W–L–H	Foursomes W–L–H	Fourballs W–L–H	Points won	Points %
Career	22	11–8–3	4–2–0	5–3–1	2–3–2	12.5	56.8
2007	4	1–2–1	1–0–0 def. A. Sörenstam 2&1	0–1–0 lost w/ N. Gulbis 3&2	0–1–1 halved w/ P. Creamer, lost w/ C. Kerr 3&2	1.5	37.5
2009	3	2–0–1	1–0–0 def. A. Nordqvist 3&2	1–0–0 won w/ K. McPherson 2 up	0–0–1 halved w/ M. Wie	2.5	83.3
2011	4	4–0–0	1–0–0 def. A. Nordqvist 2&1	1–0–0 won w/ R. O'Toole 3&2	2–0–0 won w/ P. Creamer 1 up, won w/ C. Kerr 1 up	4.0	100.
2013	4	1–3–0	0–1–0 lost to C. Ciganda 4&2	1–1–0 won w/ J. Korda 3&2, lost w/ J. Korda 2&1	0–1–0 lost w/ C. Kerr 2 dn	1.0	25.0
2015	4	2–2–0	1–0–0 def. C. Matthew 2 up	1–1–0 won w/ P. Creamer 3&2, lost w/ P. Creamer 1 dn	0–1–0 lost w/ P. Creamer 4&3	2.0	50.0
2019	3	1–1–1	0–1–0 lost to A. Nordqvist 4&3	1–0–1 halved w/ M. Alex won w/ M. Alex 2&1		1.5	50.0

== See also ==
- List of Jewish golfers
