= Golfweek =

Golf magazine and digital media outlet

- Editor: Tim Schmitt
- Categories: Golf magazine
- Frequency: Weekly (1975-2016); Monthly (2017-present)
- Publisher: Gannett Company
- Founded: 1975
- Country: United States
- Based in: Jacksonville, Florida
- Language: English
- Website: golfweek.usatoday.com
- ISSN: 0890-3514

Golfweek is a golf magazine and digital media outlet originally based in Orlando, Florida, United States. It is part of Gannett's USA Today Network.

== History and profile ==
The magazine was founded in 1975 by Charley Stine and was originally named Florida Golfweek Magazine. His son Tom Stine was editor of the magazine from 1980 to 1994. Stine sold the publication to Turnstile Publishing Company, based in Orlando, Florida, in 1990 and it became the flagship publication out of the five magazines it published. The magazine is particularly adept in its coverage of the "Best Golf Courses" in the United States by state and are often used by websites on many golf courses and resorts around the US as being on the Golfweek list. As of 2002, Eric Beckson was the president of Turnstile Publishing.

The magazine also publishes specific annual publications such as Golfweek's Best, a Guide to America's Best Classic and Modern Golf Courses and Golfweek's Ultimate Guide To Golf Course Living and Great Escapes.

Numerous experts are employed to write columns for the magazine, some of which also write or have written for Golf Digest. In 2016, Golfweek was purchased by Gannett Company, Inc. The magazine switched from the original weekly format to a monthly format in January 2017. It moved its headquarters to Jacksonville, Florida, in 2025.
