= 2010 in golf =

This article summarizes the highlights of professional and amateur golf in the year 2010.

== Men's professional golf ==
Major championships

- 8–11 April: The Masters - American Phil Mickelson defeated Englishman Lee Westwood by three strokes. The event also marked Tiger Woods' return from a self-imposed absence after revelations of marital infidelity; he finished tied for fourth.
- 17–20 June: U.S. Open - Graeme McDowell of Northern Ireland won by one stroke over France's Grégory Havret and became the first European to win the U.S. Open since 1970.
- 15–18 July: The Open Championship - Louis Oosthuizen from South Africa won by seven strokes over Lee Westwood.
- 12–15 August: PGA Championship - Martin Kaymer of Germany defeated American Bubba Watson in a three-hole playoff. Another American, Dustin Johnson, missed out on the playoff when he was ruled to have grounded his club in an unmapped bunker on the 72nd hole, incurring a two-stroke penalty.

World Golf Championships

- 18–21 February: WGC-Accenture Match Play Championship - Ian Poulter defeated fellow Englishman Paul Casey 4&2.
- 11–14 March WGC-CA Championship - Ernie Els of South Africa won his second WGC event.
- 5–8 August: WGC-Bridgestone Invitational - American Hunter Mahan won his first WGC event.
- 4–7 November: WGC-HSBC Champions - Francesco Molinari of Italy won his first WGC event.

FedEx Cup playoff events - see 2010 FedEx Cup Playoffs

- 26–29 August: The Barclays - American Matt Kuchar defeated Scotsman Martin Laird on the first playoff hole.
- 3–6 September: Deutsche Bank Championship - American Charley Hoffman shot a final-round 62 to secure a five-shot win.
- 9–12 September: BMW Championship - Dustin Johnson won by one shot over Paul Casey. In other news, Tiger Woods and Vijay Singh, who combined to win the previous three FedEx Cup titles, failed to qualify for The Tour Championship.
- 23–26 September: The Tour Championship - American Jim Furyk won by one shot over Englishman Luke Donald. The victory gave Furyk the FedEx Cup and its $10 million prize.

Other leading PGA Tour events

- 6–9 May: The Players Championship - South African Tim Clark, who had previously more money than anyone else on the PGA Tour without ever winning a tournament, took the championship by one shot over Australian Robert Allenby. Prior to his victory, Clark had played in 206 PGA Tour events without ever winning.
- 19–22 August: Wyndham Championship – In the final event before the FedEx Cup playoffs, Arjun Atwal made history by becoming the first Indian-born player ever to win on the PGA Tour, as well as the first Monday qualifier to win on tour since 1986.

For a complete list of PGA Tour results see 2010 PGA Tour.

Other leading European Tour events

- 20–23 May: BMW PGA Championship - Englishman Simon Khan won by one stroke over Fredrik Andersson Hed and Luke Donald.
- 25–28 November: Dubai World Championship - Robert Karlsson from Sweden defeated Ian Poulter in a play-off.

For a complete list of European Tour results see 2010 European Tour.

Team events

- 1–4 October: Ryder Cup - Europe win 14½-13½ after an unprecedented Monday finish following a weather affected tournament at Celtic Manor.

Tour leaders

- PGA Tour - (United States) Matt Kuchar (US$4,910,477)
  - This total does not include FedEx Cup bonuses.
- European Tour - (Germany) Martin Kaymer (€4,461,011)
  - This total includes the bonus of US$1.5 million (€1,092,418) earned for winning the Race to Dubai.
- Japan Golf Tour - (South Korea) Kim Kyung-tae (¥181,103,799)
- Asian Tour - (South Korea) Noh Seung-yul (US$822,361.03)
- PGA Tour of Australasia - (Australia) Geoff Ogilvy (A$459,900.00)
- Sunshine Tour - (South Africa) Charl Schwartzel (R5,097,913.58)
- OneAsia Tour - (China) Liang Wenchong (US$560,736.57)

Awards

- PGA Tour
  - FedEx Cup – (United States) Jim Furyk
  - PGA Player of the Year - (United States) Jim Furyk
  - Player of the Year (Jack Nicklaus Trophy) - (United States) Jim Furyk
  - Leading money winner (Arnold Palmer Award) - (United States) Matt Kuchar
  - Vardon Trophy - (United States) Matt Kuchar
  - Byron Nelson Award - (United States) Matt Kuchar
  - Rookie of the Year - (United States) Rickie Fowler
  - Comeback Player of the Year - (Australia) Stuart Appleby
  - Payne Stewart Award - (United States) Tom Lehman
- European Tour
  - Golfer of the Year - (Germany) Martin Kaymer and (Northern Ireland) Graeme McDowell
  - Rookie of the Year - (Italy) Matteo Manassero
- Nationwide Tour
  - Player of the Year - (United States) Jamie Lovemark

Other tour results

- 2010 Asian Tour
- 2010 PGA Tour of Australasia
- 2010 Canadian Tour
- 2010 Challenge Tour
- 2010 Japan Golf Tour
- 2010 Nationwide Tour
- 2010 OneAsia Tour
- 2010 Sunshine Tour
- 2010 Tour de las Américas

Other happenings

- 15 March – The International Federation of PGA Tours announced that the Mission Hills World Cup will change from an annual event to a biennial event. It will not be played in 2010 and will resume in 2011, to be played in odd-numbered years thereafter. While the event will continue to be held in China, its venue will change from the Mission Hills Golf Club in Shenzhen to Mission Hills Haikou in the island province of Hainan.
- 2 May – In the final round of The Crowns, an event on the Japan Golf Tour, Ryo Ishikawa becomes the first golfer ever to shoot 58 on a major professional tour.
- 1 November – The five-year reign of Tiger Woods in the Official World Golf Rankings ends, with England's Lee Westwood taking over the top spot.
- 5 December - Korean Kim Kyung-tae became the first golfer with non-Japanese origin to top the money list in Japan Golf Tour.

== Women's professional golf ==
LPGA majors

- 1–4 April: Kraft Nabisco Championship - Taiwan's Yani Tseng won her second career major and third LPGA Tour title, edging out Norwegian Suzann Pettersen by one shot.
- 24–27 June: LPGA Championship - American Cristie Kerr won her second career major, coming in at 19 strokes under par, 12 strokes ahead of second-place Song-Hee Kim. With that record-setting margin of victory, Kerr became the first American to be ranked the top woman golfer in the world since rankings began in 2006.
- 8–11 July: U.S. Women's Open - American Paula Creamer was the only player to finish under par in a four-stroke victory, her ninth on the LPGA Tour and her first career major win.
- 29 July-1 August: Ricoh Women's British Open - 21-year-old Yani Tseng won her second major of the year and the third of her career by one shot over Australian Katherine Hull.

Ladies European Tour major (in addition to the Women's British Open)

- 22–25 July: Evian Masters - Korean Jiyai Shin won her seventh career LPGA Tour title by one shot and reclaimed the top spot in the world rankings from Japan's Ai Miyazato.

For a complete list of Ladies European Tour results see Ladies European Tour.

Additional LPGA Tour events

- 2–5 December: LPGA Tour Championship - Swede Maria Hjorth won her fourth career LPGA Tour title by one shot.

For a complete list of LPGA Tour results see 2010 LPGA Tour.

Money list leaders

- LPGA Tour – (South Korea) Na Yeon Choi ($1,871,166)
- LPGA of Japan Tour - (South Korea) Ahn Sun-ju (¥145,073,799)
- Ladies European Tour – (South Africa) Lee-Anne Pace (€339,517.77)
- LPGA of Korea Tour - (South Korea) Lee Bo-mee (₩557,376,856)
- Ladies Asian Golf Tour - (South Africa) Lee-Anne Pace ($88,330)
- ALPG Tour - (Australia) Karrie Webb (A$132,000) (2009/2010 season)
- Duramed Futures Tour - (United States) Cindy LaCrosse ($94,578)

Awards

- LPGA Tour Player of the Year – (Taiwan) Yani Tseng
- LPGA Tour Rookie of the Year – (Spain) Azahara Muñoz
- LPGA Tour Vare Trophy – (South Korea) Na Yeon Choi
- LET Player of the Year – (South Africa) Lee-Anne Pace
- LET Rookie of the Year – (South Korea) In-Kyung Kim

Other happenings

- 23 April – Lorena Ochoa, the world's top-ranked player, announced her retirement. The 28-year-old Ochoa, with two majors and 25 other LPGA tour wins, indicated that she wanted to raise a family and work with her charitable foundation. Her last regular event was the Tres Marias Championship, although she also said she would play in the Lorena Ochoa Invitational, the tournament she hosts, in November in her hometown of Guadalajara.
- 2 May – Jiyai Shin claimed the World Number One Ranking, surpassing Lorena Ochoa who had held the position for the previous 158 weeks. Shin's ascension came after she won the Cyber Agent Ladies event on the Japan LPGA Tour. It was her seventh victory worldwide in the previous two years, including three wins on the LPGA Tour. Ochoa, playing in her last LPGA tournament before her announced retirement would have had to finish in fourth place or higher to retain the Number One position; she finished sixth.
- 9 May – The body of 25-year-old LPGA player and former University of Arizona standout Erica Blasberg was found in her Henderson, Nevada home with a plastic bag over her head. On 24 August, the Clark County Coroner ruled her death a suicide. The primary cause of death was asphyxia, with toxic levels of several prescription drugs a contributing factor.
- 20 June – Jennifer Song, the current U.S. Women's Amateur Public Links and U.S. Women's Amateur Golf champion, won her first tournament as a professional, the Futures Tour major Tate & Lyle Players Championship.
- 21 June – Ai Miyazato took over the number 1 position in the Women's World Golf Rankings, succeeding Jiyai Shin who had held the title for the previous seven weeks. Miyazato won four of the first nine official LPGA tournaments in 2010.
- 28 June - Cristie Kerr took over the number 1 position in the Women's World Golf Rankings after winning the LPGA Championship by 12 strokes. She became the first American to hold the top spot since rankings began in 2006.
- 19 July - Miyazato reclaimed the number 1 position in the Women's World Golf Rankings.
- 26 July - Shin took back the number 1 position in the Women's World Golf Rankings after her win in the Evian Masters.
- 16 August - Kerr reclaimed the number 1 position in the Women's World Golf Rankings.
- 23 August – Miyazato returned to number 1 in the Women's World Golf Rankings after winning the Safeway Classic.
- 25 October - Kerr again regained her number 1 position in the Women's World Golf Rankings after Sime Darby LPGA Malaysia.
- 1 November - Shin took back her number 1 position in the Women's World Golf Rankings after LPGA Hana Bank Championship.
- 21 November - Korean Ahn Sun-ju clinched the season money leader in LPGA of Japan Tour regardless of the outcome of the last remaining tournament, the Japan LPGA Tour Championship Ricoh Cup. She is the only non-Japanese golfer to be the season money leader after Taiwanese Ai-Yu Tu in 1991.

== Senior men's professional golf ==
Senior majors

- 27–30 May: Senior PGA Championship - American Tom Lehman won his first senior major on the first hole of a sudden-death playoff over fellow American Fred Couples and South African David Frost.
- 22–25 July: Senior British Open - Bernhard Langer of Germany won his first senior major by one shot over American Corey Pavin.
- 29 July-1 August: U.S. Senior Open - Langer won his second senior major in as many weeks by three shots over Couples.
- 19–22 August: JELD-WEN Tradition - American Fred Funk won his second Tradition and third senior major by one shot over fellow American Michael Allen and Taiwan's Lu Chien-soon.
- 7–10 October: Senior Players Championship - American Mark O'Meara won his first senior major on the first hole of a sudden-death playoff over Michael Allen.

Full results

- 2010 Champions Tour
- 2010 European Senior Tour

Money list leaders

- Champions Tour - German Bernhard Langer topped the money list for the third straight year with earnings of $2,648,939.
- European Senior Tour - Thailand's Boonchu Ruangkit topped the Order of Merit with earnings of €266,609.

Awards

- Champions Tour
  - Charles Schwab Cup – (Germany) Bernhard Langer
  - Player of the Year - (Germany) Bernhard Langer
  - Rookie of the Year - (United States) Fred Couples
  - Comeback Player of the Year - (United States) Ken Green
  - Leading money winner (Arnold Palmer Award) - (Germany) Bernhard Langer ($2,648,939)
  - Lowest stroke average (Byron Nelson Award) - (United States) Fred Couples (67.96)

== Amateur golf ==
- 18–21 May: NCAA Division I Women's Golf Championships - Purdue won its first team championship. Caroline Hedwall of Oklahoma State won the individual title.
- 1–6 June: NCAA Division I Men's Golf Championships - Augusta State won its first team championship. Scott Langley of Illinois won the individual title.
- 11–13 June: Curtis Cup - The United States claimed its seventh consecutive Cup, defeating the team from Great Britain & Ireland by a score of 12½ to 7½.
- 14–19 June: The Amateur Championship - South Korea's Jin Jeong became the first Asian player to win the Championship in the competition's 125-year history.
- 9–15 August: U.S. Women's Amateur - In a matchup of 17-year-old Americans, Danielle Kang defeated Jessica Korda, the daughter of former Czech tennis star Petr Korda, 2 & 1 in the 36-hole final.
- 23–29 August: U.S. Amateur - Oklahoma State University student Peter Uihlein beat David Chung in the final match 4&2 to win the Havemeyer Trophy.
- 20–23 October Espirito Santo Trophy - South Korea won by 17 strokes over the United States.
- 28–31 October Eisenhower Trophy - France won by four strokes over Denmark.

== World Golf Hall of Fame inductees ==
The Hall inducted no class in 2010. On 22 July, it announced that it would move future induction ceremonies to May, on the Monday before The Players Championship. The next class would be inducted on 9 May 2011.

== Table of results ==
This table summarizes all the results referred to above in date order.

Dates	Tournament	Status or tour	Winner
18-21 Feb	WGC-Accenture Match Play Championship	World Golf Championships	(England) Ian Poulter
11-14 Mar	WGC-CA Championship	World Golf Championships	(South Africa) Ernie Els
1-4 Apr	Kraft Nabisco Championship	LPGA major	(Taiwan) Yani Tseng
8-11 Apr	The Masters	Men's major	(United States) Phil Mickelson
6–9 May	The Players Championship	PGA Tour	(South Africa) Tim Clark
18–21 May	NCAA Division I Women's Golf Championships	U.S. college championship	Purdue / Caroline Hedwall
20–23 May	BMW PGA Championship	European Tour	(England) Simon Khan
27–30 May	Senior PGA Championship	Senior major	(United States) Tom Lehman
1-6 Jun	NCAA Division I Men's Golf Championships	U.S. college championship	Augusta State / Scott Langley
11-13 Jun	Curtis Cup	United States v Great Britain & Ireland women's amateur team event	Team USA
14-19 Jun	The Amateur Championship	Amateur men's individual tournament	(South Korea) Jin Jeong
17-20 Jun	U.S. Open	Men's major	(Northern Ireland) Graeme McDowell
24-27 Jun	LPGA Championship	LPGA major	(United States) Cristie Kerr
8-11 Jul	U.S. Women's Open	LPGA major	(United States) Paula Creamer
15-18 Jul	The Open Championship	Men's major	(South Africa) Louis Oosthuizen
22-25 Jul	Evian Masters	Ladies European Tour major and LPGA Tour regular event	(South Korea) Jiyai Shin
22-25 Jul	Senior British Open	Senior major	(Germany) Bernhard Langer
29-1 Aug	Women's British Open	LPGA and Ladies European Tour major	(Taiwan) Yani Tseng
29 Jul-1 Aug	U.S. Senior Open	Senior major	(Germany) Bernhard Langer
5-8 Aug	WGC-Bridgestone Invitational	World Golf Championships	(United States) Hunter Mahan
9-15 Aug	U.S. Women's Amateur	Amateur women's individual tournament	(United States) Danielle Kang
12-15 Aug	PGA Championship	Men's major	(Germany) Martin Kaymer
19-22 Aug	JELD-WEN Tradition	Senior major	(United States) Fred Funk
23-29 Aug	U.S. Amateur	Amateur men's individual tournament	(United States) Peter Uihlein
26-29 Aug	The Barclays	PGA Tour FedEx Cup playoff	(United States) Matt Kuchar
4-7 Sep	Deutsche Bank Championship	PGA Tour FedEx Cup playoff	(United States) Charley Hoffman
3-6 Sep	BMW Championship	PGA Tour FedEx Cup playoff	(United States) Dustin Johnson
23-26 Sep	The Tour Championship	PGA Tour FedEx Cup playoff	(United States) Jim Furyk
1-3 Oct	Ryder Cup	Europe v United States men's professional team event	Team Europe
7-10 Oct	Senior Players Championship	Senior major	(United States) Mark O'Meara
20-23 Oct	Espirito Santo Trophy	Women's amateur team event	South Korea
28-31 Oct	Eisenhower Trophy	Men's amateur team event	France
4-7 Nov	WGC-HSBC Champions	World Golf Championships	(Italy) Francesco Molinari
25-28 Nov	Dubai World Championship	European Tour	(Sweden) Robert Karlsson
2-5 Dec	LPGA Tour Championship	LPGA Tour	(Sweden) Maria Hjorth

The following biennial events will next be played in 2011: Solheim Cup, Presidents Cup, Seve Trophy, Mission Hills World Cup, Walker Cup.
