= 2010 U.S. Women's Open =

Coordinates: 40.526°N 79.827°W

Tournament information
- Dates: July 8–11, 2010
- Location: Oakmont, Pennsylvania
- Course: Oakmont Country Club
- Organized by: USGA
- Tour: LPGA Tour

Statistics
- Par: 71
- Length: 6,568 yards (6,006 m)
- Field: 156 players, 68 after cut
- Cut: 152 (+10)
- Prize fund: $3.25 million
- Winner's share: $585,000

Champion
- (United States) Paula Creamer
- 281 (−3)

Location in the United States
Location in Pennsylvania

The 2010 U.S. Women's Open was the 65th U.S. Women's Open, played July 8–11 at Oakmont Country Club in Oakmont, Pennsylvania, a suburb northeast of Pittsburgh. Paula Creamer, in her fourth tournament after surgery to her left thumb, won her first major championship, four shots ahead of runners-up Na Yeon Choi and Suzann Pettersen.

It was the second U.S. Women's Open, and 15th overall USGA championship (8 U.S. Open and 5 U.S. Amateur championships also; a 16th has since been hosted) held at Oakmont, which hosted 18 years earlier in 1992; Patty Sheehan won that year, in an 18-hole playoff over Juli Inkster. The Tournament was televised by ESPN and NBC Sports.

== Qualifying and field ==
For the first time since 2001, qualifying for the U.S. Women's Open took place in a single sectional qualifying tournament stage, rather than in a two-stage process of local and sectional qualifying tournaments. Twenty separate sectional qualifying tournaments took place from May 2 through June 3 in 16 states across the United States.

=== Exempt from qualifying ===
Players in eleven categories were exempt from qualifying. Players are listed only once in the first category in which they qualify, with additional categories in parentheses ( ) next to their names. Golfers qualifying in Category 10 who qualify by more than one method are also denoted with the tour by which they qualified.

1. Winners of the U.S. Women's Open for the last ten years (2000–2009)
Juli Inkster, Eun-Hee Ji (6,7), Cristie Kerr (3,6,7,8,9), Birdie Kim, Hilary Lunke, Inbee Park (7,8), Karrie Webb (5,7)
(Eligible but not playing: Annika Sörenstam^{1} and Meg Mallon^{3}) Kim and Lunke did not play.

2. Winner and runner-up from the 2009 U.S. Women's Amateur Championship (must be an amateur)
Jennifer Johnson
(The winner, Jennifer Song, turned professional on June 17, 2010, and lost her exemption in this category. She remains exempt in Category 6 below.)

3. Winners of the LPGA Championship for the last five years
Anna Nordqvist (7,9), Se Ri Pak (7,9), Suzann Pettersen (6,7,8,9), Yani Tseng (5,7,8,9)

4. Winners of the Ricoh Women's British Open for the last five years
Jeong Jang, Catriona Matthew (7,9,10–LET), Jiyai Shin (6,7,8,9), Sherri Steinhauer
(Eligible but not playing: Lorena Ochoa^{1} (5,7,8,9))

5. Winners of the Kraft Nabisco Championship for the last five years
Brittany Lincicome (6,7), Morgan Pressel (6,7)

6. From the 2009 U.S. Women's Open Championship, the 15 lowest scores and anyone tying for 15th place
Sun Ju Ahn (10–Korea), Kyeong Bae (7), Na Yeon Choi (7,9), Paula Creamer (7), In-Kyung Kim (7), Song-Hee Kim (7,8), Candie Kung (7), Ai Miyazato (7,8,9), Hee Young Park (7), Morgan Pressel (7), Jennifer Song

7. From the 2009 final official LPGA money list, the top 50 money leaders
Helen Alfredsson, Meaghan Francella, Sandra Gal, Natalie Gulbis, Sophie Gustafson (9,10–LET), Hee-Won Han, Maria Hjorth, Katherine Hull, M. J. Hur (9), Pat Hurst, Vicky Hurst, Christina Kim, Brittany Lang, Jee Young Lee, Meena Lee, Seon Hwa Lee, Stacy Lewis (8), Mika Miyazato, Ji Young Oh, Michele Redman, Angela Stanford, Momoko Ueda, Wendy Ward, Michelle Wie (8,9), Lindsey Wright, Amy Yang, Eunjung Yi, Sun Young Yoo

'8. From the 2010 official LPGA money list, the top 10 money leaders through the close of entries on May 5

9. Winners of LPGA co-sponsored events, whose victories are considered official, from the conclusion of the 2009 U.S. Women's Open Championship to the initiation of the 2010 U.S. Women's Open Championship
Bo Bae Song^{2}

10. Top five money leaders from the 2009 Japan LPGA Tour, Korea LPGA Tour, and Ladies European Tour
Japan LPGA Tour: Sakura Yokomine, Shinobu Moromizato, Chie Arimura, Mi-Jeong Jeon, Yuko Mitsuka, Korea LPGA Tour: Hee Kyung Seo, So Yeon Ryu, Bo-Mee Lee, Jeong-Eun Lee Ladies European Tour: Becky Brewerton, Tania Elósegui, Marianne Skarpnord

11. Special exemptions selected by the USGA
none offered

^{1}Both Sörenstam and Ochoa have announced their retirement, but are officially listed by the LPGA as "inactive".
^{2}Bo Bae Song was not an LPGA Tour member when she won the Mizuno Classic in 2009. This means that her victory and prize money are not included in LPGA career statistics. However, since the Mizuno Classic is sanctioned by the LPGA as an official money event, Song's victory is considered "official" for purposes of U.S. Women's Open entry.
^{3}Mallon announced her retirement from competitive golf on July 7, 2010, and withdrew from the tournament. She was replaced by alternate Nicole Vandermade.

=== Qualifiers ===
The following players qualified for the 2010 U.S. Women's Open through one of the sectional qualifying tournaments. At sites with multiple qualifiers, players are listed in order of qualifying scores, from lowest score to highest.

May 17 at White Bear Yacht Club, White Bear Lake, Minnesota
Martha Nause

May 17 at Shady Oaks Country Club, Fort Worth, Texas
María Hernández, Taylor Leon, Heather Young

May 19 at Plantation Bay Country Club, Ormond Beach, Florida
Alexis Thompson, Yueer Feng, Jaye Marie Green, Shasta Averyhardt, Sarah Kemp, Veronica Felibert

May 24 at Pinnacle Peak Country Club, Scottsdale, Arizona
Aiko Ueno, Shi Hyun Ahn, Paige Mackenzie, Nicole Zhang, Juliana Murcia Ortiz, Esther Choe

May 24 at Corral de Tierra Country Club, Corral de Tierra, California
Mina Harigae, Tiffany Lim, Sofie Andersson Sally Watson

May 24 at Mission Viejo Country Club, Mission Viejo, California
Tiffany Joh, Alison Lee, Jenny Shin, Gabriella Then

May 24 at The Oaks Club, Osprey, Florida
Jessica Korda, Samantha Richdale, Jennifer Gleason, Victoria Tanco, Sandra Changkija

May 24 at Twin Orchard Country Club, Long Grove, Florida
Libby Smith, Nicole Jeray, Laura Kueny, Ashli Bunch

May 24 at Woodmont Country Club, Rockville, Maryland
Chella Choi, Karine Icher, Pornanong Phatlum, Hye Jung Choi, Laura Diaz, Meredith Duncan, Alison Walshe, Julieta Granada, Alena Sharp, Shanshan Feng, Jung Yeon Lee, Louise Friberg

May 24 at Persimmon Woods Golf Club, St. Louis, Missouri
Kelli Shean, Lucy Nunn

May 24 at Shadow Hawk Golf Club, Richmond, Texas
Lisa McCloskey, Christi Cano, Janine Fellows

May 25 at Hawk Pointe Golf Club, Washington, New Jersey
Amanda Blumenherst, Azahara Muñoz, Na On Min, Jennifer Rosales

May 26 at White Columns Country Club, Milton, Georgia
Allison Fouch, Karen Stupples, Irene Cho, Stacy Prammanasudh, Sarah Lynn Sargent

May 26 at Tumble Creek Club, Roslyn, Washington
Christine Wong

May 30 at Hoakalei Country Club, Ewa Beach, Hawaii
Sakurako Mori

May 31 at Broadmoor Golf Club, Colorado Springs, Colorado
Kimberly Kim, Jill McGill, Mhairi McKay

June 1 at Industry Hills Golf Club, City of Industry, California
Giulia Sergas, Kaitlin Drolson, Belen Mozo, Stephanie Kono, Sun Gyoung Park, Ariya Jutanugarn, Charlotte Mayorkas, Tamie Durdin, Danielle Kang, Lizette Salas, Anna Rawson

June 1 at Twin Hills Country Club, Longmeadow, Massachusetts
Brittany Altomare, Liz Janangelo

June 2 at Fox Chapel Golf Club, Pittsburgh, Pennsylvania
Janice Moodie, Jennifer Kirby, Becky Morgan

June 3 at Carolina Trace (Lakes Course), Sanford, North Carolina
Hsiao-Ching Lu, Gwladys Nocera, Joomi Kim

Alternates

1. Courtney Ellenbogen – the first alternate from the Sanford, North Carolina qualifier with a score of 77-68=145 was added to the field when the last three winners on the LPGA Tour—Meaghan Francella, Ai Miyazato and Cristie Kerr—already had qualified for the tournament, opening up additional spots.
2. Nicole Vandermade – replaced Meg Mallon who announced her retirement from golf and withdrew from the tournament on July 7. Vandermade was the first alternate from the Richmond, Texas qualifier with a score of 74-71=145.
3. Sara-Maude Juneau – replaced Chie Arimura. Juneau was the first alternate from the St. Louis qualifier with a score of 75-71=146.

== Course layout ==
Hole	1	2	3	4	5	6	7	8	9	Out	10	11	12	13	14	15	16	17	18	In	Total
Yards	437	325	400	559	360	170	392	252	447	3,342	440	340	602	153	350	442	209	245	445	3,226	6,568
Par	4	4	4	5	4	3	4	3	5	36	4	4	5	3	4	4	3	4	4	35	71

Lengths of the course for previous U.S. Women's Opens:

- 1992: 6,312 yards (5,772 m), par 71

Note: The 9th hole is par 5 for women only in USGA championships. For men's majors, it is a par 4.

== Round summaries ==
=== First round ===
Thursday, July 8, 2010

Place	Player	Score	To par
1	(United States) Brittany Lang	69	−2
T2	(South Korea) M. J. Hur	70	−1
T2	(South Korea) Inbee Park	70	−1
T2	(South Africa) Kelli Shean (a)	70	−1
T2	(South Korea) Amy Yang	70	−1
T6	(Scotland) Mhairi McKay	71	E
T6	(Japan) Sakura Yokomine	71	E
T8	(South Korea) Shi Hyun Ahn	72	+1
T8	(United States) Paula Creamer	72	+1
T8	(Sweden) Sophie Gustafson	72	+1
T8	(United States) Vicky Hurst	72	+1
T8	(United States) Cristie Kerr	72	+1
T8	(United States) Christina Kim	72	+1
T8	(South Korea) Song-Hee Kim	72	+1
T8	(South Korea) Jeong-Eun Lee	72	+1
T8	(South Korea) Jee Young Lee	72	+1
T8	(United States) Kristy McPherson	72	+1
T8	(Japan) Shinobu Moromizato	72	+1
T8	(South Korea) Hee-Kyung Seo	72	+1
T8	(Canada) Alena Sharp	72	+1
T8	(United States) Wendy Ward	72	+1

=== Second round ===
Friday, July 9, 2010
Saturday, July 10, 2010
Weather interrupted play on Friday afternoon, and the round was concluded Saturday.

Place	Player	Score	To par
T1	(United States) Paula Creamer	72-70=142	E
T1	(Japan) Sakura Yokomine	71-71=142	E
T3	(United States) Cristie Kerr	72-71=143	+1
T3	(United States) Brittany Lang	69-74=143	+1
T5	(Sweden) Sophie Gustafson	72-72=144	+2
T5	(United States) Christina Kim	72-72=144	+2
T5	(Norway) Suzann Pettersen	73-71=144	+2
T8	(Sweden) Maria Hjorth	73-72=145	+3
T8	(South Korea) Jeong Jang	73-72=145	+3
T8	(South Korea) I.K. Kim	74-71=145	+3
T8	(United States) Stacy Lewis	75-70=145	+3
T8	(United States) Angela Stanford	73-72=145	+3
T8	(United States) Wendy Ward	72-73=145	+3
T8	(South Korea) Amy Yang	70-75=145	+3

- The 36-hole cut was at 152 (+10) or better; 68 of the 156 players advanced to the third and fourth rounds, including six amateurs.

Amateurs (a): Shean (+7), McCloskey (+8), Johnson (+9), Kang (+10), Lim (+10), Wong (+10), Watson (+11), Kono (+12), Changkija (+14), Gulyanamitta (+14), Salas (+14), Zhang (+14), Ellenbogen (+15), Korda (+15), Tanco (+16), Fellows (+17), Jutanugarn (+17), Kirby (+17), Park (+17), Juneau (+18), Murcia Ortiz (+18), Altomare (+19), Lee-Bentham (+20), Drolson (+22), Feng (+22), Then (+23), Lee (+24), Vandermade (+24), Green (+29).

=== Third round ===
Saturday, July 10, 2011

Place	Player	Score	To par
1	(United States) Paula Creamer	72-70-70=212	−1
2	(United States) Wendy Ward	72-73-70=215	+2
T3	(South Korea) Amy Yang	70-75-71=216	+3
T3	(United States) Christina Kim	72-72-72=216	+3
T3	(Norway) Suzann Pettersen	73-71-72=216	+3
6	(United States) Lexi Thompson	73-74-70=217	+4
T7	(United States) Natalie Gulbis	73-73-72=218	+5
T7	(South Korea) I.K. Kim	74-71-73=218	+5
T7	(Sweden) Sophie Gustafson	72-72-74=218	+5
T7	(United States) Cristie Kerr	72-71-75=218	+5
T7	(United States) Brittany Lang	69-74-75=218	+5
T7	(Japan) Sakura Yokomine	71-71-76=218	+5

=== Final round ===
Sunday, July 11, 2010

Place	Player	Score	To par	Money ($)
1	(United States) Paula Creamer	72-70-70-69=281	−3	585,000
T2	(South Korea) Na Yeon Choi	75-72-72-66=285	+1	248,468
T2	(Norway) Suzann Pettersen	73-71-72-69=285	+1	248,468
4	(South Korea) I.K. Kim	74-71-73-68=286	+2	152,565
T5	(South Korea) Jiyai Shin	76-71-72-68=287	+3	110,481
T5	(United States) Brittany Lang	69-74-75-69=287	+3	110,481
T5	(South Korea) Amy Yang	70-75-71-71=287	+3	110,481
T8	(South Korea) Inbee Park	70-78-73-68=289	+5	87,202
T8	(United States) Christina Kim	72-72-72-73=289	+5	87,202
T10	(Taiwan) Yani Tseng	73-76-73-68=290	+6	72,131
T10	(Japan) Sakura Yokomine	71-71-76-72=290	+6	72,131
T10	(United States) Lexi Thompson	73-74-70-73=290	+6	72,131

==== Scorecard ====
Final round

Hole	1	2	3	4	5	6	7	8	9	10	11	12	13	14	15	16	17	18
Par	4	4	4	5	4	3	4	3	5	4	4	5	3	4	4	3	4	4
(United States) Creamer	−1	−1	−1	E	−1	−1	−1	−1	−2	−2	−2	−1	−1	−2	−3	−3	−3	−3
(South Korea) Choi	+6	+6	+6	+5	+5	+4	+3	+3	+1	+1	+1	+1	+2	+2	+2	+2	+1	+1
(Norway) Pettersen	+3	+2	+2	+2	+2	+2	+1	+2	+2	+3	+3	+3	+3	+3	+3	+2	+2	+1
(South Korea) Kim	+4	+3	+4	+4	+4	+5	+5	+5	+4	+4	+4	+5	+4	+3	+3	+3	+2	+2
(South Korea) Shin	+7	+7	+6	+5	+5	+5	+5	+6	+6	+6	+6	+6	+6	+6	+5	+5	+4	+3
(United States) Lang	+5	+5	+4	+4	+3	+3	+2	+3	+3	+3	+3	+2	+1	+1	+2	+3	+3	+3
(South Korea) Yang	+3	+5	+4	+3	+5	+5	+6	+6	+5	+4	+3	+3	+4	+4	+4	+4	+2	+3
(United States) Ward	+5	+5	+5	+5	+4	+4	+4	+4	+4	+5	+5	+5	+5	+5	+5	+6	+6	+8

Cumulative tournament scores, relative to par

Eagle	Birdie	Bogey	Double bogey	Triple bogey+

== See also ==
- United States Golf Association
- Oakmont Country Club
