= 2010 LPGA Championship =

Tournament information
- Dates: June 24–27, 2010
- Location: Pittsford, New York, U.S. 43.088°N 77.563°W
- Course: Locust Hill Country Club
- Tour: LPGA Tour
- Format: Stroke play - 72 holes

Statistics
- Par: 72
- Length: 6,506 yards (5,949 m)
- Field: 150 players, 73 after cut
- Cut: 148 (+4)
- Prize fund: $2.25 million
- Winner's share: $337,500

Champion
- (United States) Cristie Kerr
- 269 (−19)
- Location in the United States Location in New York

The 2010 LPGA Championship was the 56th LPGA Championship, held June 24–27 at Locust Hill Country Club in Pittsford, New York, a suburb southeast of Rochester. Known for sponsorship reasons as the LPGA Championship presented by Wegmans, it was the second of four major championships on the LPGA Tour during the 2010 season.

The champion was Cristie Kerr, age 32, with a 269 (−19) to win by twelve strokes over Song-Hee Kim. It was Kerr's second major championship and fourteenth career win on the LPGA Tour, and vaulted her from fifth to first in the world rankings.

This was the first of four consecutive years the LPGA Championship was played at Locust Hill; the previous five editions were played at Bulle Rock Golf Course in Havre de Grace, Maryland. The LPGA had an annual tour event at Locust Hill since 1979; first known as The Sarah Coventry, it became the Wegmans LPGA in 1998 and was played through 2009.

== Course layout ==
| Hole | 1 | 2 | 3 | 4 | 5 | 6 | 7 | 8 | 9 | Out | 10 | 11 | 12 | 13 | 14 | 15 | 16 | 17 | 18 | In | Total |
|---|---|---|---|---|---|---|---|---|---|---|---|---|---|---|---|---|---|---|---|---|---|
| Yards | 414 | 337 | 380 | 532 | 161 | 439 | 178 | 466 | 172 | 3,079 | 413 | 509 | 361 | 386 | 400 | 150 | 341 | 478 | 387 | 3,425 | 6,504 |
| Par | 4 | 4 | 4 | 5 | 3 | 4 | 3 | 5 | 3 | 35 | 4 | 5 | 4 | 4 | 4 | 3 | 4 | 5 | 4 | 37 | 72 |

== Field ==
The field was composed of 150 players, with the cut to the top 70 players and ties after the second round.

== Round summaries ==
=== First round ===
Thursday, June 24, 2010

| Place | Player | Score | To par |
|---|---|---|---|
| T1 | (United States) Cristie Kerr | 68 | −4 |
| T1 | (South Korea) Seon Hwa Lee | 68 | −4 |
| T1 | (United States) Stacy Lewis | 68 | −4 |
| T4 | (Japan) Mika Miyazato | 69 | −3 |
| T4 | (South Korea) Inbee Park | 69 | −3 |
| T4 | (Australia) Lindsey Wright | 69 | −3 |
| T7 | (United States) Heather Bowie Young | 70 | −2 |
| T7 | (United States) Christina Kim | 70 | −2 |
| T7 | (Taiwan) Teresa Lu | 70 | −2 |
| T7 | (Sweden) Louise Stahle | 70 | −2 |

=== Second round ===
Friday, June 25, 2010

The cut was at 148 (+4) or better and 73 players advanced to play on the weekend.

| Place | Player | Score | To par |
|---|---|---|---|
| 1 | (United States) Cristie Kerr | 68-66=134 | −10 |
| T2 | (Japan) Mika Miyazato | 69-70=139 | −5 |
| T2 | (South Korea) Inbee Park | 69-70=139 | −5 |
| T4 | (United States) Brittany Lincicome | 71-69=139 | −4 |
| T4 | (South Korea) Amy Yang | 73-67=140 | −4 |
| T6 | (South Korea) Jimin Kang | 74-67=141 | −3 |
| T6 | (South Korea) Na-On Min | 74-67=141 | −3 |
| T6 | (Spain) Azahara Muñoz | 72-69=141 | −3 |
| T6 | (United States) Michele Redman | 74-67=141 | −3 |
| T10 | (South Korea) I.K. Kim | 72-70=142 | −2 |
| T10 | (United States) Stacy Lewis | 68-74=142 | −2 |
| T10 | (South Korea) Jiyai Shin | 72-70=142 | −2 |

=== Third round ===
Saturday, June 26, 2010

| Place | Player | Score | To par |
|---|---|---|---|
| 1 | (United States) Cristie Kerr | 68-66-69=203 | −13 |
| T2 | (South Korea) Jimin Kang | 74-67-70=211 | −5 |
| T2 | (Japan) Mika Miyazato | 69-70-72=211 | −5 |
| T2 | (Spain) Azahara Muñoz | 72-69-70=211 | −5 |
| T5 | (South Korea) Song-Hee Kim | 72-71-69=212 | −4 |
| T5 | (South Korea) Jiyai Shin | 72-70-70=212 | −4 |
| 7 | (Australia) Karrie Webb | 72-72-69=213 | −3 |
| T8 | (United States) Meaghan Francella | 73-71-70=214 | −2 |
| T8 | (South Korea) I.K. Kim | 72-70-72=214 | −2 |
| T8 | (Scotland) Catriona Matthew | 74-71-69=214 | −2 |
| T8 | (South Korea) Inbee Park | 69-70-75=214 | −2 |
| T8 | (Australia) Sarah Jane Smith | 74-71-69=214 | −2 |

=== Final round ===
Sunday, June 27, 2010

| Place | Player | Score | To par | Money ($) |
|---|---|---|---|---|
| 1 | (United States) Cristie Kerr | 68-66-69-66=269 | −19 | 337,500 |
| 2 | (South Korea) Song-Hee Kim | 72-71-69-69=281 | −7 | 207,790 |
| T3 | (Japan) Ai Miyazato | 76-71-70-66=283 | −5 | 133,672 |
| T3 | (South Korea) Jiyai Shin | 72-70-70-71=283 | −5 | 133,672 |
| T5 | (South Korea) I.K. Kim | 72-70-72-70=284 | −4 | 85,323 |
| T5 | (Australia) Karrie Webb | 72-72-69-71=284 | −4 | 85,323 |
| T7 | (United States) Meaghan Francella | 73-71-70-71=285 | −3 | 54,323 |
| T7 | (South Korea) Jimin Kang | 74-67-70-74=285 | −3 | 54,323 |
| T7 | (South Korea) Inbee Park | 69-70-75-71=285 | −3 | 54,323 |
| T7 | (United States) Morgan Pressel | 72-76-68-69=285 | −3 | 54,323 |
