= 2010 LPGA Tour =

Golf tour season

2010 LPGA Tour season
- Duration: February 13, 2010 – December 5, 2010
- Number of official events: 24
- Most wins: 5 (Japan) Ai Miyazato
- Money leader: (South Korea) Choi Na-yeon
- Rolex Player of the Year: (Taiwan) Yani Tseng
- Vare Trophy: (South Korea) Choi Na-yeon
- Rookie of the Year: (Spain) Azahara Muñoz

The 2010 LPGA Tour was a series of weekly golf tournaments for elite female golfers from around the world that began in Thailand on February 13, 2010, and ended in Florida on December 5, 2010. The tournaments were sanctioned by the United States–based Ladies Professional Golf Association (LPGA).

The tour included 24 tournaments, including events in Malaysia, southern California, and two in New Jersey that were new to the schedule in 2010. Of the 24 tournaments on the schedule, 14 were hosted in the United States. The 2010 season was the tour's smallest schedule in nearly 40 years.

Na Yeon Choi, a third-year player from Korea, topped the official money list with earnings of $1,871,166. She had two wins and 15 top-10 finishes in 23 starts and won the Vare Trophy, given to the player with the lowest scoring average. Yani Tseng from Taiwan captured Player of the Year honors; she won three tournaments in 2010 including two of the four major championships. Spaniard Azahara Muñoz won the Rookie of the Year Award.

The four majors were won by: Yani Tseng (Kraft Nabisco Championship), Cristie Kerr (LPGA Championship), Paula Creamer (U.S. Women's Open), and Yani Tseng (Women's British Open). Tseng's win in the Women's British Open at age 21 made her the youngest player in LPGA history to win three major championships.

== Changes in the 2010 season ==
The 2010 season was the 60th anniversary of the LPGA Tour. As with most years, changes were made to the schedule from the previous year, which included:

- The LPGA Championship sponsorship changed from McDonald's to Wegmans, and the major was moved from Havre de Grace, Maryland, to Rochester, New York. The championship's new home is the Locust Hill Country Club, the host course for the Wegmans LPGA, a regular tour event which was discontinued.
- The first tournament of the season in the U.S. was the Kia Classic, held in late March at La Costa in Carlsbad, California.
- Missing from the schedule was the longtime stop in Phoenix.
- The Sybase Match Play Championship made its debut, replacing the Sybase Classic; both held in northern New Jersey.
- The Bell Micro LPGA Classic returned after a one-year hiatus, held the week of May 10–16.
- After a three-year absence from Atlantic City, the tour returned with long-time supporter ShopRite as the title sponsor.

== Schedule and results ==
The season included 24 official money events, compared with 34 just two years earlier, as the LPGA struggled to cope with the economic downturn. There were three unofficial money events, with 17 off-weeks between the first and last events in 2010.

Date	Tournament	Location	Winner	First prize ($)
Feb 21	Honda PTT LPGA Thailand	Thailand	(Japan) Ai Miyazato (2)	195,000
Feb 28	HSBC Women's Champions	Singapore	(Japan) Ai Miyazato (3)	195,000
Mar 28	Kia Classic Presented by J Golf	California	(South Korea) Hee Kyung Seo (1)^{1}	255,000
Apr 4	**Kraft Nabisco Championship**	California	(Taiwan) **Yani Tseng** (3)	300,000
Apr 16	The Mojo 6^{2}	Jamaica	(Sweden) Anna Nordqvist (n/a)^{2}	350,000
May 2	Tres Marias Championship	Mexico	(Japan) Ai Miyazato (4)	195,000
May 16	Bell Micro LPGA Classic	Alabama	(South Korea) Se Ri Pak (25)	195,000
May 23	Sybase Match Play Championship	New Jersey	(South Korea) Sun-Young Yoo (1)	375,000
May 30	HSBC LPGA Brasil Cup^{2}	Brazil	(United States) Meaghan Francella (n/a)^{2}	105,000
Jun 14	LPGA State Farm Classic	Illinois	(United States) Cristie Kerr (13)	255,000
Jun 20	ShopRite LPGA Classic	New Jersey	(Japan) Ai Miyazato (5)	225,000
Jun 27	**LPGA Championship**	New York	(United States) **Cristie Kerr** (14)	337,500
Jul 4	Jamie Farr Owens Corning Classic	Ohio	(South Korea) Na Yeon Choi (3)	150,000
Jul 11	**U.S. Women's Open**	Pennsylvania	(United States) **Paula Creamer** (9)	585,000
Jul 25	Evian Masters	France	(South Korea) Jiyai Shin (7)	487,500
Aug 1	**Women's British Open**	England	(Taiwan) **Yani Tseng** (4)	408,714
Aug 22	Safeway Classic	Oregon	(Japan) Ai Miyazato (6)	225,000
Aug 29	CN Canadian Women's Open	Manitoba	(United States) Michelle Wie (2)	337,500
Sep 12	P&G NW Arkansas Championship	Arkansas	(Taiwan) Yani Tseng (5)	300,000
Oct 10	Navistar LPGA Classic	Alabama	(Australia) Katherine Hull (2)	195,000
Oct 17	CVS/pharmacy LPGA Challenge	California	(Spain) Beatriz Recari (1)	165,000
Oct 24	Sime Darby LPGA Malaysia	Malayasia	(South Korea) Jimin Kang (2)	270,000
Oct 31	LPGA Hana Bank Championship	South Korea	(South Korea) Na Yeon Choi (4)	270,000
Nov 7	Mizuno Classic	Japan	(South Korea) Jiyai Shin (8)	180,000
Nov 9	Wendy's 3-Tour Challenge^{2}	Nevada	PGA Tour	
Nov 14	Lorena Ochoa Invitational	Mexico	(South Korea) In-Kyung Kim (3)	220,000
Dec 5	LPGA Tour Championship	Florida	(Sweden) Maria Hjorth (4)	225,000

Tournaments in bold are majors.
^{1} Hee Kyung Seo was not a member of the LPGA at the time of her win in the Kia Classic.
^{2} Exhibition tournament, unofficial earnings.

== Leaders ==
Money List leaders

Rank	Player	Country	Earnings ($)	Events
1	Na Yeon Choi	South Korea	1,871,166	23
2	Jiyai Shin	South Korea	1,783,127	19
3	Cristie Kerr	United States	1,601,552	21
4	Yani Tseng	Taiwan	1,573,529	19
5	Suzann Pettersen	Norway	1,557,175	19
6	Ai Miyazato	Japan	1,457,384	21
7	In-Kyung Kim	South Korea	1,210,068	21
8	Song-Hee Kim	South Korea	1,208,698	22
9	Michelle Wie	United States	888,017	19
10	Paula Creamer	United States	883,870	14

Full 2010 Official Money List- navigate to "2010"

Scoring Average leaders

Rank	Player	Country	Average
1	Na Yeon Choi	South Korea	69.87
2	Cristie Kerr	United States	69.95
3	Suzann Pettersen	Norway	70.09
4	Song-Hee Kim	South Korea	70.21
5	Jiyai Shin	South Korea	70.25

Full 2010 Scoring Average List - navigate to "2010", then "Scoring Average"

== Awards and honors ==
The three competitive awards given out by the LPGA each year are:

- The Rolex Player of the Year is awarded based on a formula in which points are awarded for top-10 finishes and are doubled at the LPGA's four major championships.
  - 2010 Winner: (Taiwan) Yani Tseng . Runner-up: (United States) Cristie Kerr
- The Vare Trophy, named for Glenna Collett-Vare, is given to the player with the lowest scoring average for the season.
  - 2010 Winner: (South Korea) Na Yeon Choi. Runner-up: (United States) Cristie Kerr
- The Louise Suggs Rolex Rookie of the Year Award is awarded to the first-year player on the LPGA Tour who scores the highest in a points competition in which points are awarded at all full-field domestic events and doubled at the LPGA's four major championships. The award is named after Louise Suggs, one of the founders of the LPGA.
  - 2010 Winner: (Spain) Azahara Muñoz. Runner-up: (Spain) Beatriz Recari

== See also ==
- 2010 in golf
- 2010 Ladies European Tour
- 2010 Duramed Futures Tour
