= Ai Miyazato =

Japanese professional golfer (born 1985)

Ai Miyazato 宮里 藍
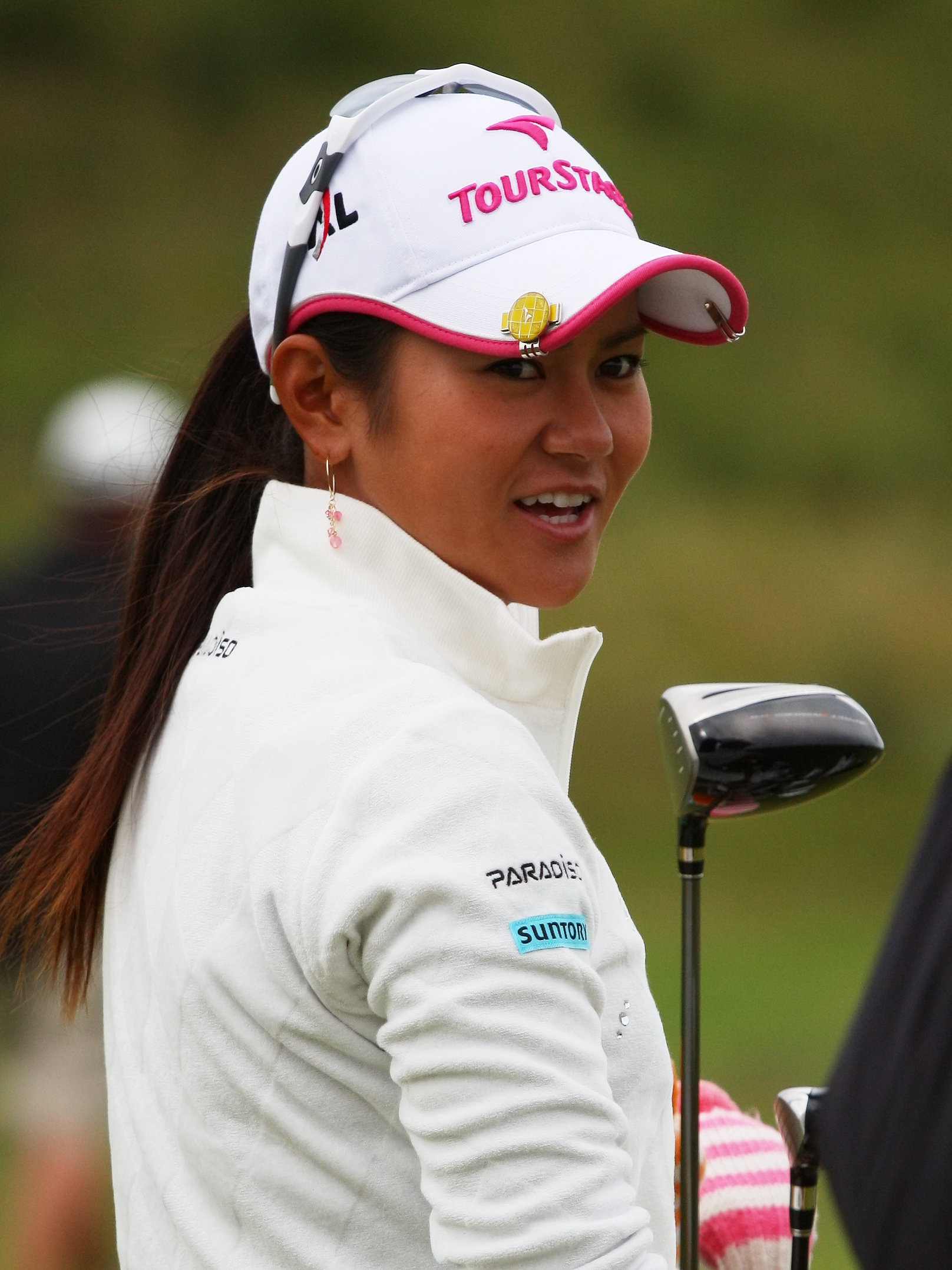
- Miyazato at the 2010 Women's British Open

Personal information
- Nationality: Japan
- Born: 19 June 1985 (age 41) Higashi, Okinawa, Japan
- Height: 5 ft 2 in (1.57 m)

Career
- Sport: Golf
- Turned professional: 2004
- Former tours: LPGA of Japan Tour; LPGA Tour; Ladies European Tour
- Professional wins: 25

Number of wins by tour
- LPGA Tour: 9
- Ladies European Tour: 2
- LPGA of Japan Tour: 15
- Other: 1

Best results in LPGA major championships
- Chevron Championship: T15: 2007
- Women's PGA C'ship: T3: 2006, 2010
- U.S. Women's Open: T6: 2009, 2011
- Women's British Open: T3: 2009
- Evian Championship: T15: 2013

Achievements and awards
- Ladies European Tour Order of Merit winner: 2011
- William and Mousie Powell Award: 2012
Medal record
Asian Games
Gold medal – first place	2002 Busan	Individual
Silver medal – second place	2002 Busan	Women's team

Ai Miyazato (宮里 藍, Miyazato Ai; born 19 June 1985) is a former Japanese professional golfer who competed on the U.S.-based LPGA Tour and the LPGA of Japan Tour (JLPGA). She was the top-ranked golfer in the Women's World Golf Rankings on three occasions in 2010.

== Early life, family and amateur career ==
Miyazato was born on 19 June 1985 in Higashi, Okinawa, Japan. Her father and brothers are professional golfers. Her older brother Yūsaku has won seven times on the Japan Golf Tour and played in the 2018 Masters Tournament. Her older brother, Kiyoshi, won once on the Japan Golf Tour.

Although both are from Okinawa, she is not related to LPGA Tour player Mika Miyazato.

As an amateur in 2003, she won a professional event on the LPGA of Japan Tour, the Dunlop Ladies Open, in Miyagi Prefecture where she was attending high school at the time.

== Professional career ==
In her 2004 rookie season on the JLPGA Tour Miyazato won five tournaments. In February 2005, she represented Japan along with Rui Kitada and won the inaugural Women's World Cup of Golf. In 2005, she won six events on the JLPGA tour, and was the #2 ranked player on the JLPGA Tour behind Yuri Fudoh.

In winning the Japan Open Championship at age 20 in 2005, Miyazato became the youngest player on the JLPGA Tour to win a major. Furthering the notion that Miyazato revived the JLPGA Tour after the retirement of Ayako Okamoto, over 32,000 spectators, the largest gallery ever to attend a JLPGA event, witnessed the final round.

At the LPGA Qualifying Tournament in Florida in December 2005, Miyazato easily secured her tour card for the 2006 season. She was under-par in four of the five rounds, and was 12 strokes ahead of the closest competitor, which set a record for the largest margin of victory. Back in Japan, on 15 December, she played the opening rounds of the Okinawa Open, becoming the first Japanese woman to compete in a domestic men's professional event, although she failed to make the cut for the final rounds.

In Miyazato’s fourth season on the LPGA Tour in 2009, she earned her first win at the Evian Masters in France, defeating Sophie Gustafson at the first hole of a sudden-death playoff.

In 2010, Miyazato won four of the first nine official tournaments on the LPGA Tour and on 21 June rose to number 1 in the Women's World Golf Rankings. She held the spot for only one week and was replaced by Cristie Kerr who held the spot for three weeks, before Miyazato regained the spot again on 19 July, by a narrow margin of 0.0006 average points.

In August, Miyazato won for the fifth time in 2010 at the Safeway Classic in Oregon, with a two-stroke victory over Kerr and Na Yeon Choi. She regained the top spot in the world rankings, which had been briefly retaken by Kerr, but then gave it up to Kerr on 25 October.

In 2011, Miyazato won the Order of Merit on the Ladies European Tour (LET), despite only playing in two events on that tour, the co-sponsored events with the LPGA. The LET has no minimum tournament requirements for membership and her second win at the Evian Masters, whose purse is much larger than most LET events, earned her enough to top the list.

In April 2012, Miyazato won her eighth LPGA event at the inaugural LPGA Lotte Championship in Hawaii, four strokes ahead of runners-up Azahara Muñoz and Meena Lee.

Miyazato has endorsements deals with Suntory, Bridgestone Corporation, Japan Airlines, Oakley, Honda, Hisamitsu, Mitsubishi Electric and NTT Docomo.

Her older brothers, Kiyoshi Miyazato and Yūsaku Miyazato are also professional golfers. She is not related to fellow Japanese LPGA Tour player Mika Miyazato.

On 27 May 2017, Kyodo News Agency reported that Miyazato would retire at the end of the season. Her last tournament was the 2017 Evian Championship.

Miyazato is the first golfer to have achieved the world number one ranking without ever winning a major. Her best finish was third three times.

== Professional wins (25) ==
=== LPGA Tour (9) ===
No.	Date	Tournament	Winning score	To par	Margin of victory	Runner(s)-up	Winner's share ($)
1	26 Jul 2009	Evian Masters^{[1]}	69-66-70-69=274	−14	Playoff	(Sweden) Sophie Gustafson	487,500
2	21 Feb 2010	Honda PTT LPGA Thailand	67-67-70-63=267	−21	1 stroke	(Norway) Suzann Pettersen	195,000
3	28 Feb 2010	HSBC Women's Champions	69-71-69-69=278	−10	2 strokes	(United States) Cristie Kerr	195,000
4	2 May 2010	Tres Marias Championship	63-72-71-67=273	−19	1 stroke	(United States) Stacy Lewis	195,000
5	20 Jun 2010	ShopRite LPGA Classic	66-67-64=197	−16	2 strokes	(South Korea) M. J. Hur	225,000
6	22 Aug 2010	Safeway Classic	66-67-72=205	−11	2 strokes	(South Korea) Choi Na-yeon (United States) Cristie Kerr	225,000
7	24 Jul 2011	Evian Masters^{[1]}	68-68-67-70=273	−15	2 strokes	(United States) Stacy Lewis	487,500
8	21 Apr 2012	LPGA Lotte Championship	71-65-70-70=276	−12	4 strokes	(South Korea) Meena Lee (Spain) Azahara Muñoz	255,000
9	1 Jul 2012	Walmart NW Arkansas Championship	68-68-65=200	−12	1 stroke	(Japan) Mika Miyazato (Spain) Azahara Muñoz	300,000

^{1} Co-sanctioned by the Ladies European Tour.

Note: Miyazato won the Evian Championship (formerly named the Evian Masters) twice before it became recognized as a major championship by the LPGA Tour in 2013.

LPGA Tour playoff record (1–0)

No.	Year	Tournament	Opponent(s)	Result
1	2009	Evian Masters	(Sweden) Sophie Gustafson	Won with birdie on first extra hole

=== JLPGA Tour (15) ===
No.	Date	Tournament	Winning score	To par	Margin of victory	Runner(s)-up
1	28 Sep 2003	Miyagi TV Cup Dunlop Ladies Open**^{a}**	70-70-71=211	−5	1 stroke	(Japan) Mari Katayama (Japan) Hiroko Yamaguchi
2	7 Mar 2004	Daikin Orchid Ladies	70-66-70=206	−10	3 strokes	(Japan) Kaori Higo
3	13 Jun 2004	Suntory Ladies Open	69-70-70-68=277	−11	6 strokes	(Japan) Toshimi Kimura (Japan) Hiroko Yamaguchi
4	20 Jun 2004	APiTA Circle K Sunkus Ladies	69-69-72=210	−6	1 stroke	(Japan) Yuri Fudoh
5	24 Oct 2004	Masters GC Ladies	69-68-68=205	−11	1 stroke	(Japan) Miho Koga
6	21 Nov 2004	Daio Paper Elleair Ladies Open	66-67-69=202	−14	3 strokes	(Japan) Chieko Amanuma (Japan) Rui Kitada
7	15 May 2005	Vernal Ladies	69-64-70=203	−13	8 strokes	(Japan) Akiko Fukushima
8	22 May 2005	Chukyo TV Bridgestone Ladies Open	65-74-70=209	−7	Playoff	(Australia) Nikki Campbell
9	21 Aug 2005	New Caterpillar Mitsubishi Ladies	66-75-68=209	−10	3 strokes	(South Korea) Jeon Mi-jeong (Japan) Hiromi Mogi
10	2 Oct 2005	**Japan Women's Open Golf Championship**	69-69-72-73=283	−5	5 strokes	(Japan) Akiko Fukushima
11	30 Oct 2005	Hisako Higuchi IDC Otsuka Kagu Ladies	67-68-67=202	−14	7 strokes	(Australia) Nikki Campbell (Japan) Kaori Higo (Taiwan) Julie Lu (Japan) Shinobu Moromizato
12	20 Nov 2005	Daio Paper Elleair Ladies Open	69-70-65=204	−12	5 strokes	(Japan) Kasumi Fujii (South Korea) Ko Woo-soon (Japan) Shiho Oyama
13	10 Sep 2006	**JLPGA Championship Konica Minolta Cup**	70-68-74-70=282	−6	3 strokes	(South Korea) Shin Hyun-ju
14	24 Sep 2006	Miyagi TV Cup Dunlop Ladies Open	70-73-71=214	−2	3 strokes	(Japan) Shiho Oyama
15	11 Oct 2009	Sankyo Ladies Open	74-70-68=212	−4	1 stroke	(Japan) Mayu Hattori (South Korea) Jeon Mi-jeong

^{a} Miyazato won the 2003 Miyagi TV Cup Dunlop Ladies Open as an amateur.
Tournament in bold denotes major championships in JLPGA Tour.

=== Other (1) ===
- 2005 Women's World Cup of Golf (with Rui Kitada)

== Results in LPGA majors ==
Results not in chronological order before 2015.

Tournament	2004	2005	2006	2007	2008	2009	2010	2011	2012	2013	2014
ANA Inspiration		T44	T29	T15	T31	69	CUT	T33	T56	T55	T67
Women's PGA Championship			T3	CUT	CUT		T3	CUT	T6	T15	CUT
U.S. Women's Open		CUT	T28	T10	T27	T6	T31	T6	T28	T11	CUT
Women's British Open	CUT	T11	9	T58	5	T3	T9	CUT	T26	CUT	T45
The Evian Championship ^										T15	CUT

Tournament	2015	2016	2017
ANA Inspiration	T41	T18	T40
Women's PGA Championship		T39	T36
U.S. Women's Open			T41
Women's British Open	CUT	CUT	CUT
The Evian Championship	T38	CUT	T32

^ The Evian Championship was added as a major in 2013

Top 10
Did not play

CUT = missed the half-way cut
"T" = tied

=== Summary ===
Tournament	Wins	2nd	3rd	Top-5	Top-10	Top-25	Events	Cuts made
ANA Inspiration	0	0	0	0	0	2	13	12
Women's PGA Championship	0	0	2	2	3	4	10	6
U.S. Women's Open	0	0	0	0	3	4	11	9
Women's British Open	0	0	1	2	4	5	14	8
The Evian Championship	0	0	0	0	0	1	5	3
Totals	0	0	3	4	10	16	53	38

- Most consecutive cuts made – 7 (2012 Kraft Nabisco – 2013 U.S. Open)
- Longest streak of top-10s – 2 (2009 U.S. Open - 2009 British Open)

== LPGA Tour career summary ==
Year	Tournaments played	Cuts made*	Wins	2nds	3rds	Top 10s	Best finish	Earnings ($)	Money list rank	Scoring average	Scoring rank
2004	2	1	0	1	0	1	T2	69,608	n/a	70.20	n/a
2005	6	5	0	0	2	1	T10	102,663	n/a	72.41	n/a
2006	21	19	0	0	1	7	T3	532,053	22	71.22	13
2007	25	19	0	1	2	7	2	788,477	17	73.01	56
2008	23	17	0	0	0	3	T4	410,833	46	72.19	48
2009	22	22	1	2	1	13	1	1,517,149	3	70.33	4
2010	21	18	5	0	1	9	1	1,457,384	6	70.65	7
2011	19	17	1	0	1	6	1	1,007,633	8	71.63	18
2012	23	20	2	2	0	11	1	1,334,977	5	70.56	6
2013	20	17	0	1	0	2	2	526,968	27	71.29	26
2014	22	15	0	0	0	0	T12	119,825	86	72.75	106
2015	23	15	0	0	0	0	T14	164,446	77	72.06	59
2016	26	20	0	0	1	1	3	275,319	67	71.99	67
2017	12	10	0	0	0	1	T5	167,285	81	71.43	54

- Official as of 2017 season

* Includes matchplay and other events without a cut.

== JLPGA prize money ==
Year	Earnings (¥)	Rank
2003	1,060,800	116
2004	122,972,349	2
2005	114,377,871	2
2006	58,604,501	10
2007	4,318,305	89
2008	27,892,338	32
2009	46,430,116	14
2010	16,911,853	48
2011	7,885,289	71
2012	3,493,200	98
2013	6,279,000	82
2014	3,109,000	104
2015	0	–
2016	0	–
2017	4,738,000	94
Career	418,072,622	44

== World ranking ==
Position in Women's World Golf Rankings at the end of each calendar year.

Year	World ranking	Source
2006	6	
2007	17	
2008	36	
2009	8	
2010	6	
2011	9	
2012	9	
2013	21	
2014	104	
2015	161	
2016	115	
2017	105^	

^ Miyazato was last ranked on 25 September 2017. She dropped from the ranking following her retirement.

== Team appearances ==
Amateur

- Espirito Santo Trophy (representing Japan): 2002

Professional

- World Cup (representing Japan): 2005 (winners), 2006
- International Crown (representing Japan): 2014
