= Cristie Kerr =

American professional golfer (born 1977)

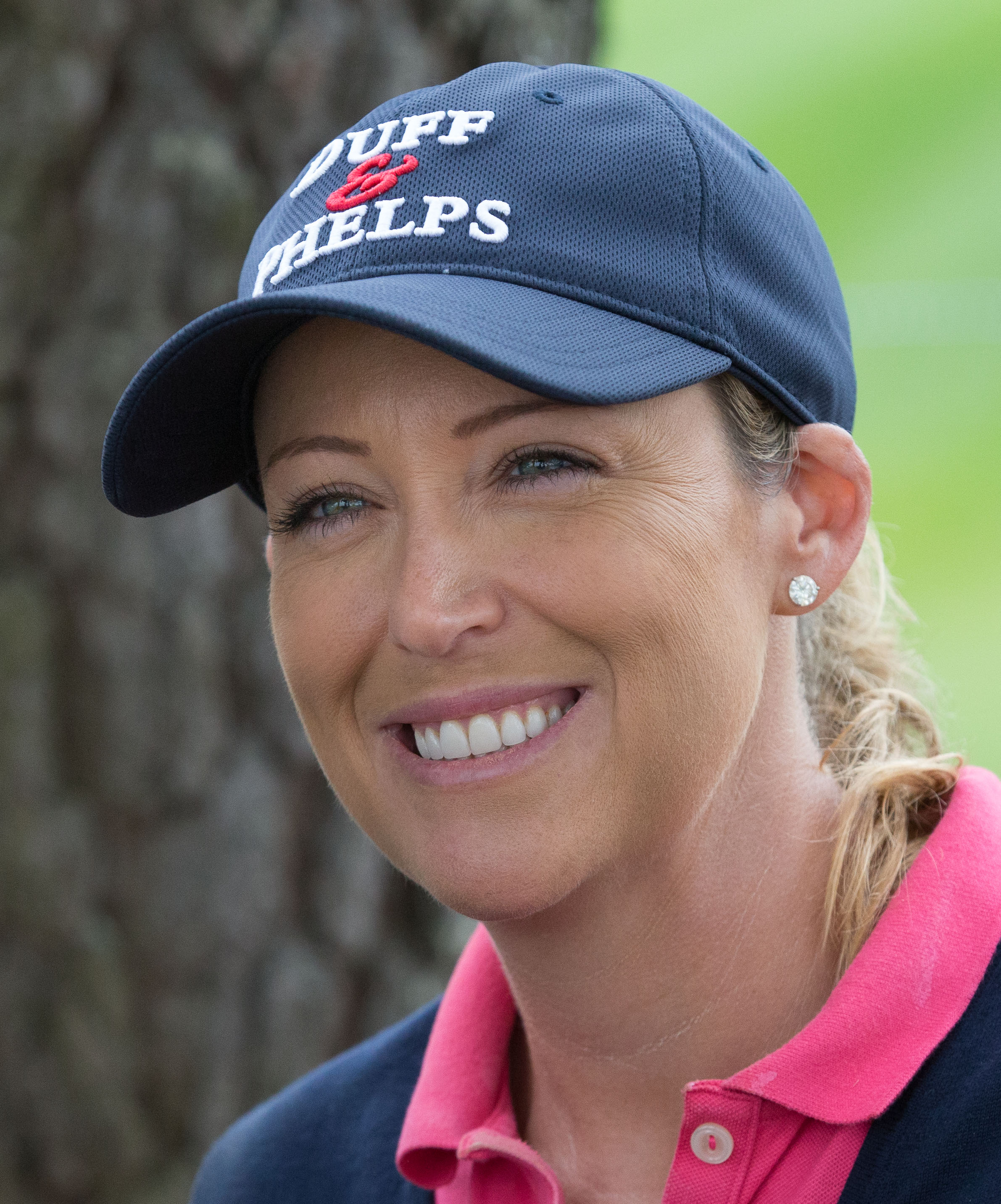
- Kerr at the 2013 Kingsmill Championship

Personal information
- Nationality: United States
- Born: October 12, 1977 (age 49) Miami, Florida, U.S.
- Height: 5 ft 3 in (1.60 m)
- Spouse: Erik Stevens (m. 2006)

Career
- Sport: Golf
- Turned professional: 1996
- Former tours: LPGA Tour (joined 1997); Futures Tour (1996); Players West Tour (1996)
- Professional wins: 25

Number of wins by tour
- LPGA Tour: 20
- Ladies European Tour: 1
- Epson Tour: 1
- Other: 3

Best results in LPGA major championships (wins: 2)
- Chevron Championship: T2: 2009
- Women's PGA C'ship: Won: 2010
- U.S. Women's Open: Won: 2007
- du Maurier Classic: T17: 1999
- Women's British Open: T2: 2006
- Evian Championship: T18: 2017

Achievements and awards
- LPGA Komen Award: 2006

Cristie Kerr (born October 12, 1977) is an American professional golfer who played on the LPGA Tour. She has 20 wins on the LPGA Tour, including two major championships, and over $20 million in career earnings. Kerr was the number one-ranked golfer in the Women's World Golf Rankings for three time periods in 2010. She is naturally left handed but plays golf right handed.

== Amateur career ==
Kerr was born in Miami, Florida, and started playing golf at the age of eight. She had a successful amateur career, winning the 1994 Junior Orange Bowl International Golf Championship and the 1995 Women's Western Amateur. She was the 1995 American Junior Golf Association Junior Player of the Year. In 1996 she played in the Curtis Cup and was the low amateur at the U.S. Women's Open. She graduated from Miami Sunset High School in West Kendall, Florida.

== Professional career ==
Kerr's first win in a professional tournament came in April 1995 in the Ironwood FUTURES Classic on the Futures Tour, which she played while still an amateur.

She turned professional in 1996 at age 18 after graduating from high school, playing on both the Futures Tour and Players West Tour. In October 1996, she tied for sixth at the LPGA Final Qualifying Tournament to gain exempt status for 1997. Her LPGA career started fairly slowly; she broke into the top fifty on the money list in her third season in 1999, but did not win until her sixth season. In 2002, she won her first LPGA event at the Longs Drugs Challenge in California. By 2004, she was one of the leading players on the tour, with three tournament victories, and a fifth-place finish on the money list. She won two tournaments in 2005 and moved up to third on the money list. She tied for second at the 2000 U.S. Women's Open, matched by her performance in the 2006 Women's British Open. Her first win of 2006 came at the Franklin American Mortgage Championship where she posted a tournament-record score of 19 under par. In 2006, she was the only American to win more than one event on the LPGA Tour, winning three times. She won the 2007 U.S. Women's Open, her first major championship. She was also a member of the United States Solheim Cup team in 2002, 2003, and 2005.

The hallmarks of Kerr's game are putting; she finished in the top five on the LPGA Tour in putts/greens hit in 2005 and 2006 and iron play. She was fifth in greens-in-regulation in 2005. In 2005, Kerr finished in the top 10 in half of the tournaments she entered, and ranked second in the LPGA in scoring average, trailing only Annika Sörenstam.

In 2010, Kerr won two of the first 10 tournaments on the LPGA Tour, including the LPGA Championship, which she won by a record-breaking 12-stroke margin over the second-place finisher Song-Hee Kim. As a result of this finish, she went to the top of the Women's World Golf Rankings on June 28, 2010. Kerr held the position for three weeks before Ai Miyazato again regained the top ranking by a margin of 0.0006 average points.

In 2015, Kerr won the CME Group Tour Championship by one shot over fellow American Gerina Piller and South Korean Jang Ha-na. That year she made 24 cuts out of 25 events, captured her 17th career victory at the Kia Classic and posted a 3–0–1 record at her eight Solheim Cup, helping the U.S. team to victory.

In 2016, she recorded four top-10 finishes, including a tie for seventh at the LPGA KEB Hana Bank Championship. She was also on the victorious U.S. team at the UL International Crown, where she posted a team-best 3–1–0 record. In 2017, Kerr recorded her 19th and 20th career wins, moving her into a tie with Laura Davies for 26th all-time on the LPGA career wins list. That year she also participated in her ninth Solheim Cup for the U.S., posting a 3–0–1 record, thereby surpassing Juli Inkster for the all-time lead in points recorded by a U.S. player in Solheim Cup history (21). In 2018, Kerr recorded two top-10 finishes, with a season-best finish tied for second at the Kia Classic

== Breast cancer activism ==
Kerr is actively involved in fundraising for breast cancer research. The LPGA and the Susan G. Komen Breast Cancer Foundation awarded Kerr the 2006 LPGA Komen Award due to her dedication to find a cure for breast cancer through the foundation that she founded called Birdies for Breast Cancer. Kerr donates $50 per birdie. As of August 2009, she has raised over $750,000 through donations and an annual charity event. Kerr created the foundation in honor of her mother, Linda, who has been her inspiration. The foundation was created in 2003, the year that her mother Linda was diagnosed with breast cancer. Kerr also founded Curvature Wines, which helps to raise money for breast cancer charities.

== Personal life and off-course activities ==
Kerr is 5 ft 3 in (1.60 m) in height. In 1999, she weighed 175 pounds (79 kg), a weight that caused her to have back spasms. Her parents, who are divorced, are both diabetics, and her mother had a heart attack when Kerr was in the ninth grade. After her weight peaked, Kerr began exercising regularly and went on a diet. By 2002, she had lost 50 pounds (23 kg), and weighs 125 pounds (57 kg).

Kerr made an appearance on an episode of the third season of Donald Trump's television series The Apprentice in 2005. In 2006, Kerr married businessman Erik Stevens. Kerr and Stevens maintain a residence in Scottsdale, Arizona. One of her sponsors is Mutual of Omaha, which donates money to her breast cancer research foundation every time she places third or better. On December 8, 2013, she and Stevens welcomed their first child, a son named Mason, via a surrogate. Kerr welcomed a second boy, Griffin, on August 28, 2018.

On December 4, 2020, Kerr and her caddie Matt Gelczis were injured in a collision between golf carts before sunrise prior to the start of the second round of the Volunteers of America Classic at the Old American Golf Club in The Colony, Texas. The two were sent to an emergency room at a local hospital, and released later that day. Kerr withdrew from the tournament. After completing the first round of the 2020 U.S. Women's Open, in which she shot a 71, she described what happened: Kerr and Gelczis struck another cart head-on, having been blinded by its headlights, which the cart Kerr was riding on didn't have; she and Gelczis were using a flashlight to try and find their way to the driving range, where the other cart had been coming from. The two were thrown from the cart; Kerr landed on her chest, suffering three dislocated ribs, and bruising on her arms; in order to get through her first round at the U.S. Women's Open, she regularly took pain medication. According to Kerr, Gelczis's injuries were far less severe, receiving only a "bump on the head", and whiplash.

Kerr partnered with Pride Mountain Vineyards in Napa, California, to launch her Curvature wine label with the 2006 vintage. She has also launched a new wine venture, Kerr Cellars, with winemaker Helen Keplinger, beginning with a 2013 vintage. The label now produces Pinot noir and red and white Bordeaux blends. In 2013, she passed the Court of Master Sommeliers level I test.

== Professional wins (25) ==
=== LPGA Tour wins (20) ===
Legend
Major championships (2)
Other LPGA Tour (18)

No.	Date	Tournament	Winning score	To par	Margin of victory	Runner(s)-up	Winner's share ($)
1	Apr 21, 2002	Longs Drugs Challenge	66-72-67-75=280	−8	1 stroke	(South Korea) Hee-Won Han	135,000
2	Apr 17, 2004	LPGA Takefuji Classic	69-67-73=209	−7	Playoff	(South Korea) Seol-An Jeon	165,000
3	Jun 20, 2004	ShopRite LPGA Classic	66-68-68=202	−11	1 stroke	(United States) Paula Creamer (a) (Italy) Giulia Sergas	195,000
4	Sep 5, 2004	State Farm Classic	69-63-63-69=264	−24	1 stroke	(United States) Christina Kim	180,000
5	May 8, 2005	Michelob ULTRA Open at Kingsmill	68-68-68-72=276	−8	5 strokes	(United States) Jill McGill	330,000
6	Aug 28, 2005	Wendy's Championship for Children	68-67-66-69=270	−18	1 stroke	(United States) Paula Creamer (Sweden) Annika Sörenstam	165,000
7	May 7, 2006	Franklin American Mortgage Championship	67-69-66-67=269	−19	2 strokes	(United States) Pat Hurst (Mexico) Lorena Ochoa (United States) Angela Stanford	165,000
8	Aug 13, 2006	CN Canadian Women's Open	67-70-74-65=276	−12	1 stroke	(United States) Angela Stanford	255,000
9	Sep 10, 2006	John Q. Hammons Hotel Classic	70-61-68=199	−14	1 stroke	(Sweden) Annika Sörenstam	150,000
10	Jul 1, 2007	U.S. Women's Open	71-72-66-70=279	−5	2 strokes	(Mexico) Lorena Ochoa (Brazil) Angela Park	560,000
11	Aug 24, 2008	Safeway Classic	71-67-65=203	−13	Playoff	(Sweden) Helen Alfredsson (Sweden) Sophie Gustafson	255,000
12	May 10, 2009	Michelob ULTRA Open at Kingsmill (2)	69-63-66-70=268	−16	2 strokes	(South Korea) In-Kyung Kim	330,000
13	Jun 13, 2010	LPGA State Farm Classic (2)	67-67-63-69=266	−22	1 stroke	(South Korea) Na Yeon Choi (Sweden) Anna Nordqvist	255,000
14	Jun 27, 2010	LPGA Championship	68-66-69-66=269	−19	12 strokes	(South Korea) Song-Hee Kim	337,500
15	Nov 11, 2012	Lorena Ochoa Invitational	67-69-67-69=272	−16	1 stroke	(South Korea) Inbee Park (United States) Angela Stanford	200,000
16	May 5, 2013	Kingsmill Championship (3)	66-71-66-69=272	−12	Playoff	(Norway) Suzann Pettersen	195,000
17	Mar 29, 2015	Kia Classic	67-68-68-65=268	−20	2 strokes	(South Korea) Mirim Lee	255,000
18	Nov 22, 2015	CME Group Tour Championship	68-69-66-68=271	−17	1 stroke	(South Korea) Jang Ha-na (United States) Gerina Piller	500,000
19	Apr 15, 2017	Lotte Championship	71-69-62-66=268	−20	3 strokes	(South Korea) Chun In-gee (South Korea) Jang Su-yeon (New Zealand) Lydia Ko	300,000
20	Oct 29, 2017	Sime Darby LPGA Malaysia	70-63-65-71=269	−15	1 stroke	(United States) Jacqui Concolino (China) Shanshan Feng (United States) Danielle Kang	270,000

LPGA Tour playoff record (3–3)

No.	Year	Tournament	Opponent(s)	Result
1	2004	LPGA Takefuji Classic	(South Korea) Seol-An Jeon	Won with par on seventh extra hole
2	2004	ADT Championship	(Sweden) Annika Sörenstam	Lost to bogey on first extra hole
3	2008	Safeway Classic	(Sweden) Helen Alfredsson (Sweden) Sophie Gustafson	Won with birdie on first extra hole
4	2008	Navistar LPGA Classic	(United States) Candie Kung (Mexico) Lorena Ochoa	Ochoa won with par on second extra hole Kerr eliminated by par on first hole
5	2013	Kingsmill Championship	(Norway) Suzann Pettersen	Won with par on second extra hole
6	2017	Volunteers of America Texas Shootout	(Japan) Haru Nomura	Lost to birdie on sixth extra hole

=== Futures Tour wins (1) ===
No.	Date	Tournament	Winning score	To par	Margin of victory	Runner-up	Winner's share ($)
1	Apr 3, 1995	Ironwood Futures Classic	71-67=138	−6	3 strokes	(United States) Stephanie Comstock	n/a^

^ Won as an amateur, top professional (Comstock) earned $4,500.

=== Ladies European Tour (1) ===
No.	Date	Tournament	Winning score	Margin of victory	Runner-up
1	Oct 8, 2017	Lacoste Ladies Open de France	−17 (62-64-68-69=263)	4 strokes	(China) Lin Xiyu

=== Other wins (2) ===
- 2010 (1) Notah Begay III Foundation Challenge (with Hunter Mahan)
- 2011 (1) Notah Begay III Foundation Challenge (with Hunter Mahan)

=== Legends of the LPGA wins (1) ===
- 2025 LPGA Legends Championship

== Major championships ==
=== Wins (2) ===
Year	Championship	Winning score	Margin	Runner(s)-up
2007	U.S. Women's Open	−5 (71-72-66-70=279)	2 strokes	(Mexico) Lorena Ochoa, (Brazil) Angela Park
2010	LPGA Championship	−19 (68-66-69-66=269)	12 strokes	(South Korea) Song-Hee Kim

=== Results timeline ===
Results not in chronological order.

Tournament	1995	1996	1997	1998	1999	2000
Chevron Championship		CUT				T35
U.S. Women's Open	CUT	T36LA		60	CUT	T2
Women's PGA Championship			CUT	CUT	T5	WD
du Maurier Classic			CUT	T54	T17	CUT

Tournament	2001	2002	2003	2004	2005	2006	2007	2008	2009	2010
Chevron Championship	T66	T3	T11	T5	T3	T35	T20	T21	T2	T5
U.S. Women's Open	T4	T32	T13	T27	T10	T28	1	T13	T3	T17
Women's PGA Championship	CUT	T41	T34	T17	T33	T5	T18	T10	T31	1
Women's British Open ^	CUT	T29	T14	T11	T5	T2	T33	6	T8	T5

Tournament	2011	2012	2013	2014	2015	2016	2017	2018	2019	2020
Chevron Championship	CUT	T22	T19	T4	T41	T45	7	T30	T52	T32
U.S. Women's Open	3	T9	T20	CUT	CUT	T8	T19	T52	CUT	T23
Women's PGA Championship	T3	T12	T12	T17	T19	T50	CUT	T49	T60	T37
The Evian Championship ^^			CUT	T67	T53	T39	T18	CUT	CUT	NT
Women's British Open ^	T14	T13	16	WD	T13	72	T59	T28	CUT	CUT

Tournament	2021	2022	2023	2024	2025
Chevron Championship	T28				
U.S. Women's Open	CUT				
Women's PGA Championship	CUT	CUT	CUT	CUT	CUT
The Evian Championship		CUT			
Women's British Open					

^ The Women's British Open replaced the du Maurier Classic as an LPGA major in 2001
^^ The Evian Championship was added as a major in 2013.

Win
Top 10
Did not play

LA = low amateur
CUT = missed the half-way cut
WD = withdrew
NT = no tournament
T = tied

=== Summary ===
Tournament	Wins	2nd	3rd	Top-5	Top-10	Top-25	Events	Cuts made
Chevron Championship	0	1	2	6	7	12	23	21
U.S. Women's Open	1	1	2	5	8	14	26	20
Women's PGA Championship	1	0	1	4	5	11	29	19
The Evian Championship	0	0	0	0	0	1	7	4
Women's British Open	0	1	0	3	5	11	20	16
du Maurier Classic	0	0	0	0	0	1	5	2
Totals	2	3	5	18	25	50	110	82

- Most consecutive cuts made – 36 (2002 Kraft Nabisco – 2010 British Open)
- Longest streak of top-10s – 4 (2009 U.S. Open – 2010 LPGA)

== LPGA Tour career summary ==
Year	Tournaments played	Cuts made*	Wins	2nd	3rd	Top 10s	Best finish	Earnings ($)	Money list rank	Scoring average	Scoring rank
1997	27	14	0	0	0	0	T15	49,058	112	73.44	109
1998	26	17	0	0	0	1	T4	88,613	74	72.89	90
1999	23	16	0	0	0	3	T5	177,978	47	72.09	53
2000	24	23	0	2	1	8	T2	530,751	15	71.94	19
2001	23	18	0	0	2	5	3	373,947	28	72.26	60
2002	26	22	1	1	3	8	1	685,393	12	71.47	17
2003	23	21	0	2	2	8	T2	696,097	13	70.69	7
2004	24	22	3	2	0	11	1	1,189,990	5	70.33	4
2005	22	20	2	2	4	11	1	1,360,941	3	70.86	2
2006	26	26	3	3	0	19	1	1,578,362	5	70.07	3
2007	22	19	1	0	1	6	1	1,098,921	6	71.88	17
2008	26	26	1	1	0	11	1	1,108,839	10	70.88	5
2009	25	25	1	1	2	13	1	1,519,722	2	70.28	3
2010	21	21	2	2	2	13	1	1,601,552	3	69.95	2
2011	22	20	0	3	3	12	2	1,470,979	2	70.71	3
2012	23	21	1	0	0	7	1	837,314	14	71.27	19
2013	21	18	1	0	1	5	1	710,946	19	71.19	22
2014	24	22	0	2	1	11	2	911,883	15	70.57	11
2015	25	21	2	1	0	8	1	1,294,301	7	70.64	13
2016	25	22	0	0	0	4	T7	456,215	39	71.23	33
2017	23	21	2	1	1	10	1	1,414,752	7	69.95	12
2018	22	20	0	1	0	2	T2	426,981	51	71.09	33
2019	21	13	0	0	0	3	T9	181,456	80	71.64	79
2020	16	12	0	0	0	2	T6	243,576	47	71.43	35
2021	14	7	0	0	0	1	T6	98,870	113	72.06	95
2022	13	5	0	0	0	0	T12	58,962	139	72.38	123
2023	10	3	0	0	0	0	33	13,449	180	73.96	n/a
2024	2	0	0	0	0	0	CUT	0	n/a	74.00	n/a
2025	3	0	0	0	0	0	CUT	0	n/a	75.50	n/a
Totals^	602	495	20	24	23	182	1	20,179,848	4		

^ Official as of 2025 season
* Includes matchplay and other tournaments without a cut.

== World ranking ==
Position in Women's World Golf Rankings at the end of each calendar year.

Year	Ranking	Notes
2006	4	
2007	6	
2008	7	
2009	4	
2010	2	
2011	4	
2012	11	
2013	12	
2014	13	
2015	11	
2016	30	
2017	10	
2018	31	
2019	110	
2020	99	
2021	167	
2022	394	
2023	818	
2024	unranked	
2025	1130	

== Team appearances ==
Amateur

- Curtis Cup (representing the United States): 1996

Professional

- Solheim Cup (representing the United States): 2002 (winners), 2003, 2005 (winners), 2007 (winners), 2009 (winners), 2011, 2013, 2015 (winners), 2017 (winners)
- Lexus Cup (representing International team): 2007, 2008 (winners)
- International Crown (representing the United States): 2014, 2016 (winners), 2018

=== Solheim Cup record ===
Year	Total matches	Total W–L–H	Singles W–L–H	Foursomes W–L–H	Fourballs W–L–H	Points won	Points %
Career	38	18–14–6	3–4–2	4–5–3	11–5–1	21	55.3
2002	4	1–3–0	0–1–0 lost to S. Gustafson 3&2	0–1–0 lost w/ M. Redman 4&3	1–1–0 won w/ R. Jones 1 up, lost w/ R. Jones 1 up	1	25.0
2003	4	3–1–0	1–0–0 def. S. Pettersen 1 up	0–1–0 lost w/ K. Kuehne 3&1	2–0–0 won w/ K. Kuehne 2&1, won w/ K. Kuehne 2&1	3	75.0
2005	4	2–2–0	0–1–0 lost to G. Nocera 2&1	0–1–0 lost w/ N. Gulbis 2&1	2–0–0 won w/ N. Gulbis 2&1, won w/ P. Creamer 1 up	2	50.0
2007	5	1–3–1	0–1–0 lost to L. Wessberg 1 up	0–1–1 halved w/ P. Hurst, lost w/ N. Castrale 1 dn	1–1–0 won w/ N. Castrale 3&2, lost w/ M. Presel 3&2	1.5	30.0
2009	4	2–1–1	0–0–1 halved w/ M. Hjorth	1–0–0 won w/ M. Wie 1 up	1–1–0 won w/ P. Creamer 1 up, lost w/ N. Castrale 1 up	2.5	62.5
2011	5	2–2–1	0–1–0 lost to K. Stupples 10&8^{1}	1–0–1 won w/ M. Wie 2&1, halved w/ P. Creamer	1–1–0 lost w/ M. Wie 2 down, won w/ M. Pressel 1 up	2.5	50.0
2013	4	1–2–1	0–0–1 halved with K. Icher	0–1–0 lost w/ P. Creamer 2&1	1–1–0 won w/ M. Wie 2&1, lost w/ M. Pressel 2dn	1.5	37.5
2015	4	3–0–1	1–0–0 def. C. Hull 3&2	1–0–0 won w/ L. Thompson 2&1	1–0–1 halved w/ L. Thompson won w/ L. Thompson 3&2	3.5	87.5
2017	4	3–0–1	1–0–0 def. M. Reid 2&1	1–0–1 halved w/ L. Thompson won w/ L. Thompson 5&3	1–0–0 won w/ L. Thompson 4&2	3.5	87.5

^{1} Kerr conceded the match at the start because of injury; Solheim Cup rules categorized this as a 10 and 8 loss.

== See also ==
- List of golfers with most LPGA major championship wins
- List of golfers with most LPGA Tour wins

Awards and achievements
Preceded by (Mexico) Lorena Ochoa	Best Female Golfer ESPY Award; 2011, 2012	Succeeded by (United States) Stacy Lewis
