= Shasta Averyhardt =

American golfer

Shasta Averyhardt is an American golfer. A professional since 2009, she is the first African-American golfer on the LPGA Tour since 2001 when she qualified in 2010 for the 2011 tour. She went to Jackson State University, a historically black university. She is also of Mexican descent.
