= Kim In-Kyung =

South Korean professional golfer (born 1988)

In-Kyung Kim
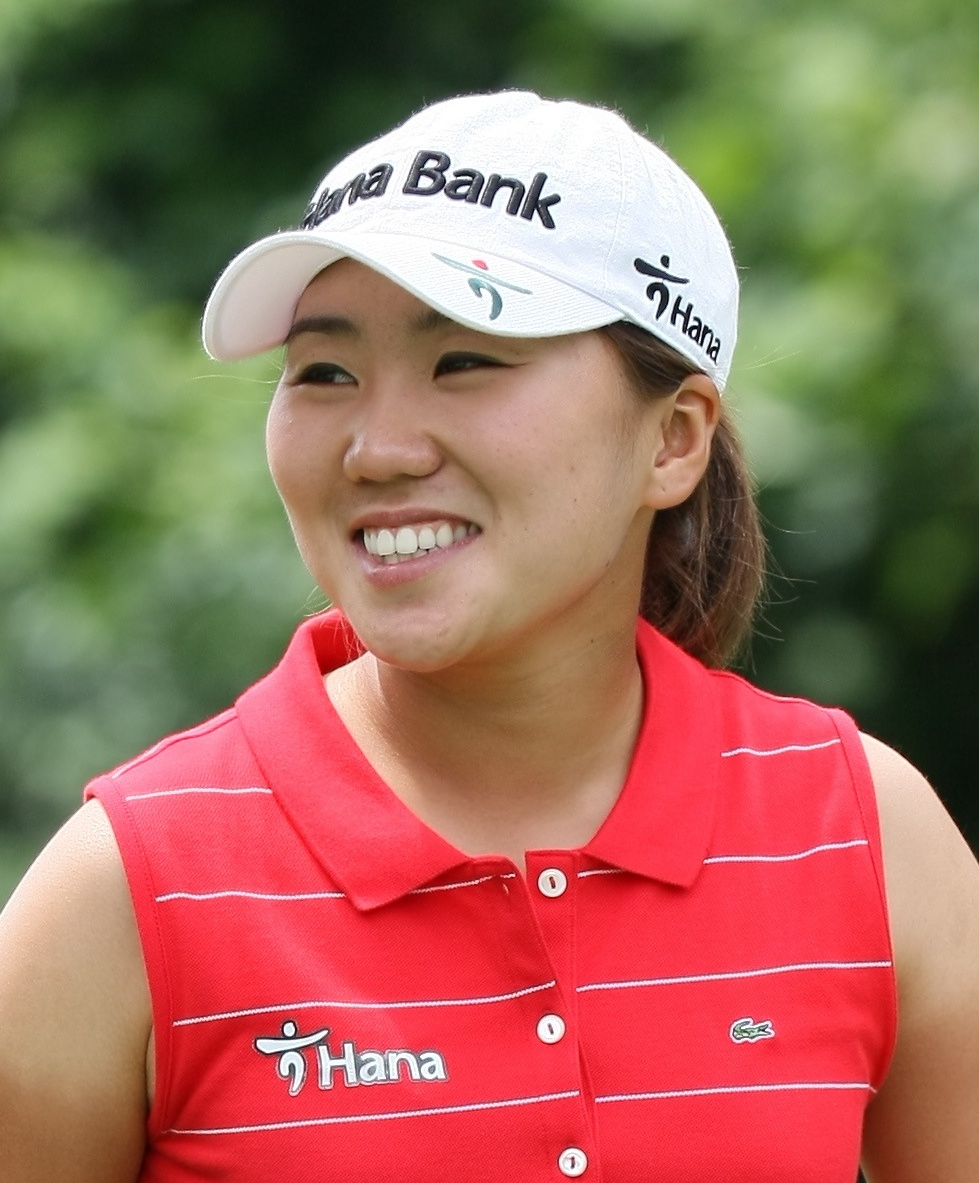
- Kim at the 2009 LPGA Championship

Personal information
- Full name: In-Kyung Kim
- Nickname: I. K.
- Nationality: South Korea
- Born: 13 June 1988 (age 38) South Korea
- Height: 1.6 m (5 ft 3 in)

Career
- Sport: Golf
- Turned professional: 2006
- Current tours: LPGA Tour (joined 2007); Ladies European Tour (joined 2010)
- Professional wins: 10

Number of wins by tour
- LPGA Tour: 7
- Ladies European Tour: 4

Best results in LPGA major championships (wins: 1)
- Chevron Championship: 2nd: 2012
- Women's PGA C'ship: T5: 2010
- U.S. Women's Open: 2nd: 2013
- Women's British Open: Won: 2017
- Evian Championship: 6th: 2016

Achievements and awards
- Ladies European Tour Rookie of the Year: 2010

- Kim In-Kyung
- Hangul: 김인경
- Hanja: 金人卿
- RR: Gim Ingyeong
- MR: Kim In'gyŏng

Kim In-Kyung, also called In-Kyung Kim and I. K. Kim (born 13 June 1988), is a South Korean retired professional golfer who played on the LPGA Tour from 2007 through 2024.

== Amateur career ==
Kim was a member of the Korean National Team in 2003 and 2004 and won three tournaments on the International Junior Golf tour. In 2005, playing on the American Junior Golf Association (AJGA), she won the 2005 Hargray Junior Classic. Also in 2005, she won the U.S. Girls' Junior and was the medalist in the stroke play portion of the U.S. Women's Amateur.

== Professional career ==
Kim earned co-medalist honors at the LPGA Final Qualifying Tournament in Florida in December 2006 as an amateur to earn full exempt status for the 2007 season. She turned professional immediately following the tournament.

In her rookie year of 2007 she had four top-10 finishes on the LPGA Tour. In 2008, she had seven top-10 finishes and claimed her first win at the Longs Drugs Challenge.

In June 2009, she claimed her second career title with a one-shot win over compatriot Se Ri Pak to take the LPGA State Farm Classic in Illinois. In December 2009 Kim won her third professional title, winning the Dubai Ladies Masters on the Ladies European Tour.

Kim won her fourth professional title and third LPGA title at the 2010 Lorena Ochoa Invitational. The day after she won, she announced that she had donated her entire $220,000 winnings to charity: half to the Lorena Ochoa Foundation which funds educational programs for children in Mexico and the other half to an American charity. The donation amounted to nearly 20 percent of her total winnings to date for the 2010 season.

In 2010 Kim also won Rookie of the Year honors on the Ladies European Tour. She joined the LET in 2010 after winning the Dubai Ladies Masters in December 2009. In 2010, she had won €193,154.69 in four LET events, including three top-10 finishes.

Currently, former PGA Tour caddy Michael Dunsmore carries Kim's bag. In early 2010, Kim bought a home in Rancho Santa Fe, California, a suburb north of San Diego. She practices at Fairbanks Ranch Country Club, where she is an honorary member.

On the final day of the 2012 Kraft Nabisco Championship, Kim had a one-foot putt on the 18th green to seal her first major championship. The putt lipped out, forcing a playoff with Sun-Young Yoo, which Yoo won. This disappointment was followed by a relative dry spell for Kim on LPGA Tour which included two playoff losses, and one win on the European Ladies Tour in 2014. The LPGA dry spell ended in October 2016 when Kim won Reignwood LPGA Classic held in China. In 2017 Kim won three times on the LPGA Tour, including her first major title at the Women's British Open.

Kim retired following the 2024 season.

== Professional wins (10) ==
=== LPGA Tour wins (7) ===
Legend
Major championships (1)
Other LPGA Tour (6)

No.	Date	Tournament	Winning score	To par	Margin of victory	Runner-up	Winner's share ($)
1	12 Oct 2008	Longs Drugs Challenge	67-69-69-73=278	−10	3 strokes	(United States) Angela Stanford	180,000
2	7 Jun 2009	LPGA State Farm Classic	69-68-69-65=271	−17	1 stroke	(South Korea) Pak Se-ri	255,000
3	14 Nov 2010	Lorena Ochoa Invitational	69-68-68-64=269	−19	3 strokes	(Norway) Suzann Pettersen	220,000
4	2 Oct 2016	Reignwood LPGA Classic	70-64-68-66=268	−24	1 stroke	(South Korea) Mi Jung Hur	315,000
5	4 Jun 2017	ShopRite LPGA Classic	66-67-69=202	−11	2 strokes	(Sweden) Anna Nordqvist	225,000
6	23 Jul 2017	Marathon Classic	65-67-68-63=263	−21	4 strokes	(United States) Lexi Thompson	240,000
7	6 Aug 2017	Ricoh Women's British Open	65-68-66-71=270	−18	2 strokes	(England) Jodi Ewart Shadoff	504,821

LPGA Tour playoff record (0–5)

No.	Year	Tournament	Opponent(s)	Result
1	2007	Wegmans LPGA	(Mexico) Lorena Ochoa	Lost to par on second extra hole
2	2010	Jamie Farr Owens Corning Classic	(South Korea) Choi Na-yeon, (United States) Christina Kim (South Korea) Song-Hee Kim	Choi won with birdie on second extra hole
3	2012	Kraft Nabisco Championship	(South Korea) Yoo Sun-young	Lost to birdie on first extra hole
4	2013	Kia Classic	(Spain) Beatriz Recari	Lost to birdie on second extra hole
5	2014	Portland Classic	(United States) Austin Ernst	Lost to par on first extra hole

=== Ladies European Tour wins (4) ===
No.	Date	Tournament	Winning score	To par	Margin of victory	Runner-up	Winner's share (€)
1	12 Dec 2009	Omega Dubai Ladies Masters	70-65-67-68=270	−18	3 strokes	(United States) Michelle Wie	75,000
2	6 Jul 2014	ISPS Handa Ladies European Masters	71-68-63-68=270	−18	5 strokes	(Australia) Nikki Campbell	75,000
3	11 Sep 2016	ISPS Handa Ladies European Masters (2)	67-70-71-63=271	−17	5 strokes	(Spain) Belén Mozo	75,000
4	6 Aug 2017	Ricoh Women's British Open	65-68-66-71=270	−18	2 strokes	(England) Jodi Ewart Shadoff	431,180

== Major championships ==
=== Wins (1) ===
Year	Championship	54 holes	Winning score	Margin	Runner-up
2017	Ricoh Women's British Open	6 stroke lead	−18 (65-68-66-71=270)	2 strokes	(England) Jodi Ewart Shadoff

=== Results timeline ===
Results not in chronological order.

Tournament	2006	2007	2008	2009	2010
Chevron Championship			CUT	T28	T44
U.S. Women's Open	CUT	T61	T3	T3	4
Women's PGA Championship		T21	CUT	T16	T5
Women's British Open		T42	T9	T20	T3

Tournament	2011	2012	2013	2014	2015	2016	2017	2018	2019	2020
Chevron Championship	T10	2	T55	T39	T51	49	T27	T30	T4	T64
U.S. Women's Open	T10	CUT	2	T30	T35	CUT	CUT	T34		
Women's PGA Championship	T12	T25	T22		CUT	T30	CUT	T8	T14	
The Evian Championship ^			T19	T27	T16	6	T10		T11	NT
Women's British Open	T37	T10	T47	CUT		T50	1	T39	T51	CUT

Tournament	2021	2022	2023	2024	2025	2026
Chevron Championship	CUT	CUT				
U.S. Women's Open	T26	T51				
Women's PGA Championship	CUT	T21	CUT			
The Evian Championship		CUT				
Women's British Open		T58	CUT	81		CUT

^ The Evian Championship was added as a major in 2013.

Win
Top 10
Did not play

CUT = missed the half-way cut
NT = no tournament
T = tied

=== Summary ===
Tournament	Wins	2nd	3rd	Top-5	Top-10	Top-25	Events	Cuts made
Chevron Championship	0	1	0	2	3	3	15	12
U.S. Women's Open	0	1	2	4	5	5	15	11
Women's PGA Championship	0	0	0	1	2	9	15	10
The Evian Championship	0	0	0	0	2	5	7	6
Women's British Open	1	0	1	2	4	5	17	13
Totals	1	2	3	9	16	27	69	52

- Most consecutive cuts made – 16 (2008 U.S. Open – 2012 LPGA)
- Longest streak of top-10s – 4 (2010 LPGA – 2011 Kraft Nabisco)

== LPGA Tour career summary ==
Year	Tournaments played	Cuts made	Wins	2nds	3rds	Top 10s	Best finish	Earnings ($)	Money list rank	Scoring average	Scoring rank
2005	1	1	0	0	0	0	T39	n/a		75.67	
2006	1	0	0	0	0	0	MC	n/a		77.00	
2007	25	21	0	1	0	4	2	454,226	31	72.63	35
2008	27	22	1	0	1	8	1	773,956	22	71.54	18
2009	25	21	1	1	2	10	1	1,238,396	8	71.00	13
2010	21	20	1	1	2	12	1	1,210,068	7	70.51	6
2011	20	18	0	1	3	9	T2	862,312	10	70.96	8
2012	21	17	0	1	0	5	2	561,302	26	71.31	20
2013	23	23	0	2	0	9	2	1,125,389	7	70.49	7
2014	18	15	0	1	0	2	2	349,765	48	71.63	39
2015	20	16	0	0	1	2	3	339,622	54	71.60	39
2016	17	14	1	0	0	4	1	628,908	29	71.03	25
2017	17	12	3	0	0	6	1	1,227,674	12	70.09	13
2018	16	13	0	1	0	5	2	460,644	50	71.16	34
2019	15	12	0	0	0	2	T4	402,109	53	71.21	49
2020	3	2	0	0	0	0	T58	11,836	147	74.00	n/a
2021	9	6	0	0	0	0	T26	69,620	122	72.45	n/a
2022	14	6	0	0	0	0	T21	145,412	105	72.85	139
2023	11	3	0	0	0	0	T22	45,937	158	72.59	126
2024	7	5	0	0	1	1	T3	139,880	117	72.40	n/a

Official as of 2024 season

== Team appearances ==
Professional

- Lexus Cup (representing Asia team): 2007 (winners)
- International Crown (representing South Korea): 2014, 2018 (winners)
