= Suzann Pettersen =

Norwegian professional golfer (born 1981)

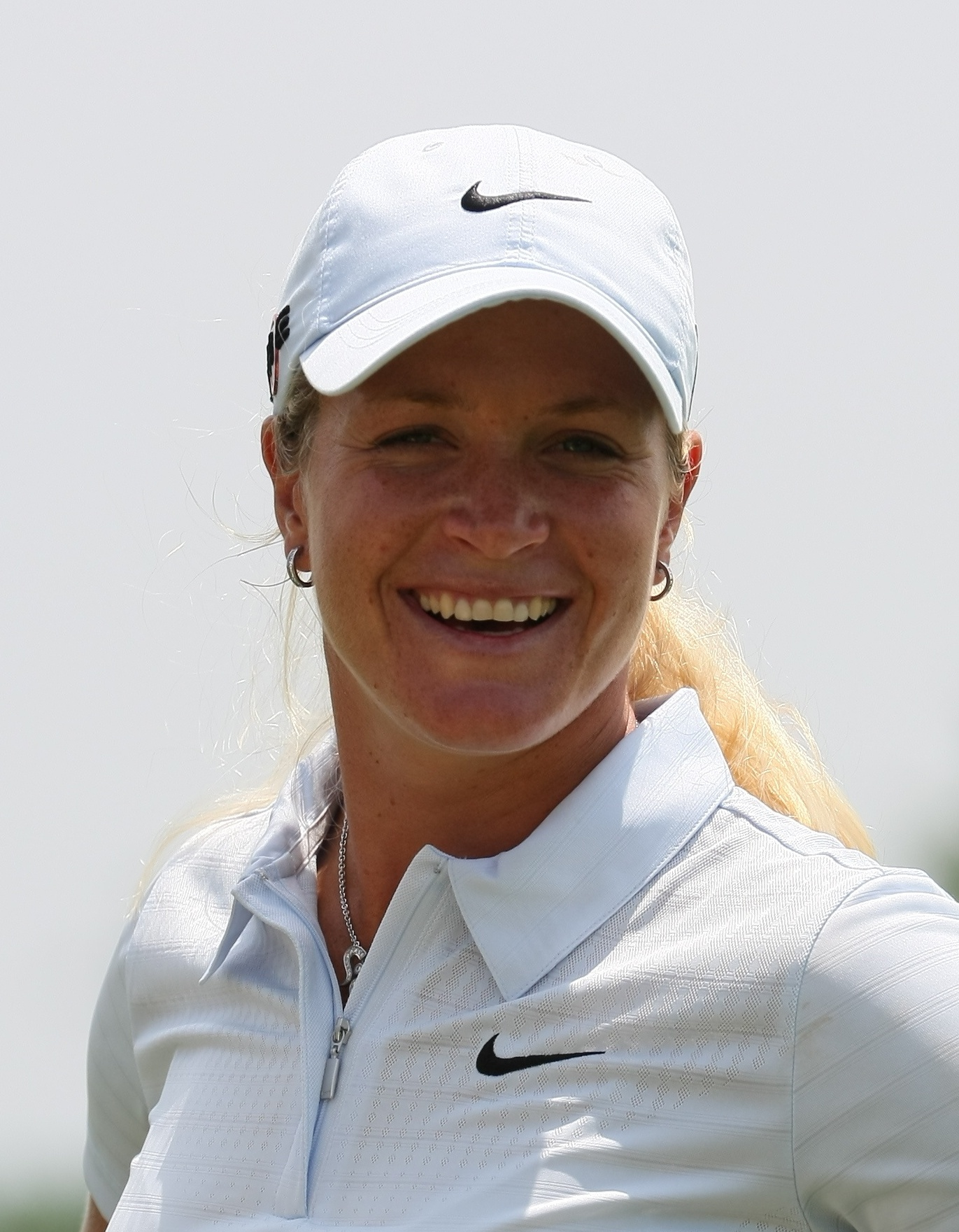
- Pettersen at the 2009 LPGA Championship

Personal information
- Full name: Suzann Pettersen
- Nickname: Tutta
- Nationality: Norway
- Born: 7 April 1981 (age 45) Oslo, Norway
- Height: 5 ft 8 in (1.73 m)
- Spouse: Christian Fredrik Ringvold

Career
- Sport: Golf
- Turned professional: 2000
- Former tours: LPGA Tour (2003–2019); Ladies European Tour (2001–2017)
- Professional wins: 21

Number of wins by tour
- LPGA Tour: 15
- Ladies European Tour: 7

Best results in LPGA major championships (wins: 2)
- Chevron Championship: T2/2nd: 2007, 2008, 2010
- Women's PGA C'ship: Won: 2007
- U.S. Women's Open: T2: 2010
- Women's British Open: T2: 2014
- Evian Championship: Won: 2013

Achievements and awards
- Ladies European Tour Rookie of the Year: 2001
- Ladies European Tour Order of Merit: 2013

Suzann Pettersen (born 7 April 1981) is a Norwegian professional golfer. She played mainly on the U.S.-based LPGA Tour and was also a member of the Ladies European Tour. Her career-best world ranking was second.

== Early life and amateur career ==
Pettersen was born in Oslo, Norway. Both her parents, Axel and Mona, participated in sports. She has two brothers, Stefan and Gunerius. Suzann Pettersen is a distant relative of merchant Gunerius Pettersen (1826–1892).

As an amateur, Pettersen won the Norwegian Amateur five times consecutively: from 1996–2000. In 1999, she won the Girls Amateur Championship. She represented Norway in the world amateur team championship for women, the Espirito Santo Trophy in 1998 and 2000, finishing as the leading individual in her second appearance. Pettersen also represented Europe in the 1997 and 1999 Junior Ryder Cup matches.

== Professional career ==
=== Ladies European Tour ===
In 2000, Pettersen turned professional at the age of 19. She gained her Ladies European Tour card with an 11th-place finish at the 2001 LET Qualifying School. In her 2001 rookie season, she played in ten events without missing a cut. In her second start as a professional, Pettersen won the Open de France Dames in a playoff over Becky Morgan. She finished second on the Order of Merit and was named LET Rookie of the Year.

Pettersen started 2002 with a playoff loss to Karrie Webb in the AAMI Australian Women's Open, and two more top ten finishes led to her winning a place on the European team for the 2002 Solheim Cup. In the singles, Pettersen was five down with five to play and ended up with a tie against Michele Redman. She tied for 10th at the LPGA Final Qualifying Tournament to earn exempt status for the 2003 LPGA season.

=== LPGA Tour ===
In 2003, Pettersen played in five events on the LET, missing no cuts and finished runner-up to Sophie Gustafson at the HP Open. She played a full rookie season on the LPGA, with her best finish a third place at the Chick-fil-A Charity Championship. Pettersen was a captain's pick for the 2003 Solheim Cup and recorded a 4–1–0 record as a member of the victorious European Team.

In 2004, Pettersen played in just four events on the LET, with a best finish of T9 at the Evian Masters. On the LPGA, she began her season late after recuperating from elbow surgery. Pettersen recorded four top-10 finishes including a season-best tie for fifth at the State Farm Classic.

In 2005, Pettersen played in only three events on the LET and nine events on the LPGA because of a debilitating back injury. When she returned, her best LPGA finish was a sixth at the John Q. Hammons Hotel Classic, and she finished tied for second at the Ladies Finnish Masters on the LET. Pettersen registered a 2–0–2 record as a captain's pick on the European Solheim Cup Team and played for the International team at the inaugural Lexus Cup.

In 2006, Pettersen played five times on the LET, recording two top ten finishes, including a third place at the Scandinavian TPC. On the LPGA Tour she had three top-ten finishes, with a season's best finish fifth at the Florida's Natural Charity Championship.

At the start of 2007, Pettersen was selected to represent Norway at the Women's World Cup of Golf but withdrew due to illness before the event started. At the Safeway International she recorded her then-best finish on the LPGA Tour, second place, two strokes behind Lorena Ochoa. A late collapse at the Kraft Nabisco saw her equal that finish, her second-best at a major. Pettersen became the first Norwegian LPGA winner at the 2007 Michelob ULTRA Open at Kingsmill, beating Jee Young Lee in a playoff. Pettersen followed up this win by capturing the second major championship of 2007, the LPGA Championship, by one stroke over Karrie Webb, which moved her up to fourth in the Women's World Golf Rankings. On the Ladies European Tour she won the SAS Masters in her native Norway. In October at the Longs Drugs Challenge, Pettersen won her third LPGA victory, beating Lorena Ochoa in a playoff and then claimed wins number four and five in Korea and Thailand. On 31 December 2007, she reached the number two position in the Women's World Golf Rankings, surpassing Karrie Webb and Annika Sörenstam, trailing only Lorena Ochoa.

In January 2008, Pettersen signed a multi-year agreement with Nike Golf to represent Nike in clubs, balls, footwear, gloves and bags. Her first win of 2008 came at the rain-shortened Deutsche Bank Ladies Swiss Open.

In September 2009, Pettersen won her sixth LPGA Tour event and first in two years at the CN Canadian Women's Open at Priddis Greens Golf & Country Club in Calgary, Alberta. Pettersen won the event by five strokes over Karrie Webb, Momoko Ueda, Morgan Pressel, Ai Miyazato and Angela Stanford.

In 2010, Pettersen was a runner-up six times on the LPGA Tour in 2010, but did not record a victory.

Pettersen broke her 20-month victory drought in May when she captured the Sybase Match Play Championship at Hamilton Farm Golf Club in New Jersey. Playing in cool, rainy conditions, she won all six of her 18-hole matches over four days, and defeated, among others, then-world number one Yani Tseng in the quarter-finals, and Cristie Kerr in the finals. In early August, Pettersen won the Ladies Irish Open on the LET with a 198 (-18), six shots clear of the field. It was Pettersen's first victory on the LET in 3 years, her last was the same tournament in 2008, played at Portmarnock Links. In her next start two weeks later, Pettersen won again on the LPGA Tour at the Safeway Classic in Oregon. She came from nine shots back at the start of the final round and shot a 64 (-7) to force a playoff against second-round leader Na Yeon Choi. Pettersen won on the first extra hole with a par after Choi put her approach shot in the water to double bogey. The victory moved her world ranking up to No. 2, ahead of Cristie Kerr and behind only Yani Tseng.

In 2012, Pettersen won twice in October on the LPGA Tour 2012, both in Asia.

In March 2013, Pettersen won the Mission Hills World Ladies Championship. In April, she won the LPGA Lotte Championship. In September, she won the Safeway Classic, then The Evian Championship. In October, Pettersen won her fourth event of the LPGA Tour season when she captured the Sunrise LPGA Taiwan Championship.

=== Solheim Cup ===
Pettersen was involved in a controversy at the 2015 Solheim Cup match in St. Leon-Rot, Baden-Württemberg, Germany, in the second day afternoon four-ball match between Pettersen and Charley Hull for Europe against Alison Lee and Brittany Lincicome, United States. On the 17th green, with the match all square, Lee missed a putt to win the hole. Taking for granted that the next 18-inch putt was conceded, Lee picked up her ball. However, Pettersen pointed out that it was not conceded, and the Europeans won the hole. The European team captain Carin Koch and vice captain Annika Sörenstam tried to convince Pettersen to change her mind and concede the putt, but as it was a fact that Lee had picked up her ball without the putt being given to her, it wasn't a possibility within the rules of golf, for the players to agree on the outcome of the hole and change the sequence of events afterwards. Pettersen/Hull eventually won the match and Europe took a 10–6 lead going into singles. However, the United States won the Solheim Cup after a strong comeback during the singles play on the last day of the match.

For the 2017 the Solheim Cup match, 18–20 August in West Des Moines, Iowa, United States, Pettersen qualified for the team by her Women's World Golf Rankings, and should have made her 9th consecutive appearance, but withdrew with a back injury. European team captain Annika Sörenstam had previously named Catriona Matthew an assistant captain, but replaced her with Pettersen and nominated Matthew as a player instead.

Pettersen was picked for the 2019 Solheim Cup European team by captain Catriona Matthew, who was criticized for choosing a player who had been away from golf for nearly two years on maternity leave. Pettersen had played only two events before Matthew chose her and missed the cut in both. At the time, Pettersen was ranked 620th in the world. That pick proved to be astute, as, on 15 September 2019, Pettersen holed her birdie putt on the 18th in her singles match at Gleneagles PGA Centenary Course to defeat Marina Alex, 1 up, to win the Solheim Cup for Europe.

Almost immediately after making the putt, the 38-year-old Pettersen announced that she'd no longer play professional golf. "I think this is a perfect closure," Pettersen said. "A nice 'the end' for [my] professional career. It doesn't get any better." Pettersen retired having won 15 times on the LPGA Tour, including two majors: the 2007 Women's PGA Championship and the 2013 Evian Championship. "Life's changed so much for me over the last year," Pettersen said. "He's [son Herman] obviously the biggest thing that's ever happened for me. But now I know what it feels like to win as a mom. I'm going to leave it like that."

On 29 November 2021, Pettersen was announced as the 2023 European Solheim Cup captain.

== Awards and honors ==
- In 2001, Pettersen was named Ladies European Tour Rookie of the Year.
- In 2013, she led the Ladies European Tour's Order of Merit.

== Professional wins (21) ==
=== Ladies European Tour wins (7) ===
No.	Date	Tournament	Winning score	To par	Margin of victory	Runner-up	Winner's share (€)
1	7 Jun 2001	Open de France Dames	71-70-70-69=280	−8	Playoff	(Wales) Becky Morgan	24,450
2	26 Aug 2007	SAS Masters	64-72-68=204	−12	9 strokes	(Australia) Nikki Garrett	30,000
3	25 May 2008	Deutsche Bank Ladies Swiss Open	67-63-64=194	−22	6 strokes	(South Korea) Amy Yang	78,750
4	13 Jul 2008	AIB Ladies Irish Open	69-69-67=205	−11	5 strokes	(Norway) Marianne Skarpnord	65,000
5	7 Aug 2011	Ladies Irish Open	71-63-64=198	−18	6 strokes	(Spain) Azahara Muñoz	60,000
6	10 Mar 2013	Mission Hills World Ladies Championship	70-67-67-66=270	−18	1 stroke	(South Korea) Inbee Park	57,560
7	15 Sep 2013	The Evian Championship	66-69-68=203	−10	2 strokes	(New Zealand) Lydia Ko	366,393

=== LPGA Tour wins (15) ===
Legend
Major championships (2)
Other LPGA Tour (13)

No.	Date	Tournament	Winning score	To par	Margin of victory	Runner(s)-up	Winner's share ($)
1	13 May 2007	Michelob ULTRA Open at Kingsmill	66-72-68-68=274	−10	Playoff	(South Korea) Jee Young Lee	330,000
2	10 Jun 2007	McDonald's LPGA Championship	69-67-71-67=274	−14	1 stroke	(Australia) Karrie Webb	300,000
3	7 Oct 2007	Longs Drugs Challenge	75-65-64-73=277	−11	Playoff	(Mexico) Lorena Ochoa	165,000
4	21 Oct 2007	Hana Bank-KOLON Championship	69-72=141	−3	1 stroke	(South Korea) Eun-Hee Ji	225,000
5	28 Oct 2007	Honda LPGA Thailand	65-68-63-71=267	−21	1 stroke	(England) Laura Davies	195,000
6	6 Sep 2009	CN Canadian Women's Open	65-68-66-70=269	−15	5 strokes	(Japan) Ai Miyazato (United States) Morgan Pressel (United States) Angela Stanford (Japan) Momoko Ueda (Australia) Karrie Webb	412,500
7	22 May 2011	Sybase Match Play Championship	1 up			(United States) Cristie Kerr	375,000
8	21 Aug 2011	Safeway Classic	69-74-64=207	−6	Playoff	(South Korea) Na Yeon Choi	225,000
9	21 Oct 2012	LPGA KEB-HanaBank Championship	63-68-74=205	−11	Playoff	(Scotland) Catriona Matthew	270,000
10	28 Oct 2012	Sunrise LPGA Taiwan Championship	69-65-66-69=269	−19	3 strokes	(South Korea) Inbee Park	300,000
11	20 Apr 2013	LPGA Lotte Championship	65-69-68-67=269	−19	Playoff	(United States) Lizette Salas	255,000
12	1 Sep 2013	Safeway Classic	68-63-70-67=268	−20	2 strokes	(United States) Stacy Lewis	195,000
13	15 Sep 2013	The Evian Championship	66-69-68=203	−10	2 strokes	(New Zealand) Lydia Ko	487,500
14	27 Oct 2013	Sunrise LPGA Taiwan Championship	68-69-73-69=279	−9	5 strokes	(Spain) Azahara Muñoz	300,000
15	7 Jun 2015	Manulife LPGA Classic	66-65-66-69=266	−22	1 stroke	(United States) Brittany Lang	225,000

LPGA Tour playoff record (5–3)

No.	Year	Tournament	Opponent(s)	Result
1	2007	Michelob ULTRA Open at Kingsmill	(South Korea) Jee Young Lee	Won with par on third extra hole
2	2007	Longs Drugs Challenge	(Mexico) Lorena Ochoa	Won with birdie on second extra hole
3	2009	Safeway Classic	(South Korea) M. J. Hur (United States) Michele Redman	Hur won with birdie on second extra hole Redman eliminated by par on first hole
4	2010	Bell Micro LPGA Classic	(United States) Brittany Lincicome (South Korea) Se Ri Pak	Pak won with birdie on third extra hole Pettersen eliminated by par on second hole
5	2011	Safeway Classic	(South Korea) Na Yeon Choi	Won with par on first extra hole
6	2012	LPGA KEB-HanaBank Championship	(Scotland) Catriona Matthew	Won with birdie on third extra hole
7	2013	LPGA Lotte Championship	(United States) Lizette Salas	Won with par on first extra hole
8	2013	Kingsmill Championship	(United States) Cristie Kerr	Lost to par on second extra hole

== Major championships ==
=== Wins (2) ===
Year	Championship	Winning score	Margin	Runner-up	Winner's share ($)
2007	McDonald's LPGA Championship	−14 (66-67-71-67=271)	1 stroke	(Australia) Karrie Webb	300,000
2013	The Evian Championship	−10 (66-69-68=203)	2 strokes	(New Zealand) Lydia Ko	487,500

=== Results timeline ===
Results not in chronological order before 2015.

Tournament	2001	2002	2003	2004	2005	2006	2007	2008	2009	2010	2011	2012
ANA Inspiration		T25				T40	T2	T2	T5	2	T19	T15
Women's PGA Championship			T11	CUT	T49	T20	1	T34	WD	T11	T3	T2
U.S. Women's Open			T10	T16	T52	T28	CUT	T13	T6	T2	T15	T9
Women's British Open	T32	24	CUT	CUT		CUT	T28	T24	CUT	T14	T37	CUT

Tournament	2013	2014	2015	2016	2017
ANA Inspiration	T3		T8	T10	T3
Women's PGA Championship	T3	T6	T7	T12	T25
U.S. Women's Open	CUT	CUT	CUT	T21	T56
Women's British Open	T4	T2	5	CUT	CUT
The Evian Championship ^	1	6	T34	T55	T40

^ The Evian Championship was added as a major in 2013

Win
Top 10
Did not play

CUT = missed the half-way cut
WD = withdrew
T = tied

=== Summary ===
Tournament	Wins	2nd	3rd	Top-5	Top-10	Top-25	Events	Cuts made
ANA Inspiration	0	3	2	6	8	11	12	12
Women's PGA Championship	1	1	2	4	6	11	15	13
U.S. Women's Open	0	1	0	1	4	8	15	11
Women's British Open	0	1	0	3	3	6	16	9
The Evian Championship	1	0	0	1	2	2	5	5
Totals	2	6	4	15	23	38	63	50

- Most consecutive cuts made – 11 (2010 Kraft Nabisco – 2012 U.S. Open)
- Longest streak of top-10s – 5 (2014 British – 2015 WPC)

== LPGA Tour career summary ==
Year	Tournaments played	Cuts made*	Wins	2nd	3rd	Top 10s	Best finish	Earnings ($)	Money list rank	Scoring average	Scoring rank
2001	2	2	0	0	0	0	T11	48,750	n/a (115)	71.00	
2002	5	4	0	0	0	0	24	48,632	n/a (113)	71.72	
2003	19	18	0	0	1	4	3	387,920	31	71.08	16
2004	16	9	0	0	0	4	T5	193,845	58	71.59	32
2005	9	7	0	0	0	1	T6	81,224	92	73.03	n/a
2006	23	21	0	0	0	3	T5	292,621	46	72.12	42
2007	24	21	5	2	0	11	1	1,802,400	2	70.86	3
2008	24	24	0	3	2	10	2	1,177,809	7	70.96	6
2009	23	22	1	3	0	12	1	1,369,717	5	70.49	6
2010	19	19	0	6	1	12	2	1,557,175	5	70.09	3
2011	20	19	2	0	2	11	1	1,322,770	5	70.97	6
2012	24	23	2	1	0	5	1	1,182,860	9	70.74	7
2013	23	20	4	1	5	15	1	2,296,106	2	69.70	2
2014	24	23	0	1	1	10	T2	1,001,927	11	70.28	6
2015	23	18	1	0	0	10	1	912,603	14	70.64	12
2016	21	19	0	1	1	8	2	745,190	22	70.53	15
2017	21	19	0	0	1	4	T3	507,398	37	70.40	23
2018	Maternity leave										
2019	4	1	0	0	0	0	T59	5,611	172	72.00	n/a

- Official through the 2019 season

* Includes matchplay and other events without a cut.

== LET career summary ==
Year	LET wins	Earnings (€)	Money list rank	Scoring average
2000	0	2,084	n/a	n/a
2001	1	211,472	2	71.25
2002	0	118,808	8	71.89
2003	0	79,622	11	70.41
2004	0	49,352	n/a	71.00
2005	0	38,924	43	72.60
2006	0	52,903	34	71.09
2007	1	79,604	25	72.13
2008	2	183,279	6	68.60
2009	0	9,037	107	73.67
2010	0	149,490	7	69.75
2011	1	142,087	9	69.36
2012	0	69,212	39	72.31
2013	1	518,449	1	67.50
2014	0	36,858	n/a	70.25
2015	0	80,047	n/a	70.73

- Career LET earnings are €1,209,331 (through 2012), includes LPGA co-sanctioned events

== World ranking ==
Position in Women's World Golf Rankings at the end of each calendar year.

Year	World ranking	Source
2006	53	
2007	3	
2008	5	
2009	3	
2010	3	
2011	2	
2012	6	
2013	2	
2014	4	
2015	12	
2016	18	
2017	32	
2018	138	
2019	876	

== Team appearances ==
=== As player ===
Amateur

- European Girls' Team Championship (representing Norway): 1997
- Espirito Santo Trophy (representing Norway): 1998, 2000 (individual winner)
- European Ladies' Team Championship (representing Norway): 1999
- Junior Ryder Cup (representing Europe): 1997, 1999 (winners)

Professional

- Solheim Cup (representing Europe): 2002, 2003 (winners), 2005, 2007, 2009, 2011 (winners), 2013 (winners), 2015, 2019, 2023 (non-playing captain, tied, cup retained), 2024 (non-playing captain)
- Lexus Cup (representing International team): 2005 (winners), 2007, 2008 (winners)
- Wendy's 3-Tour Challenge: 2009 (winners)

==== Solheim Cup record ====
Year	Total matches	Total W–L–H	Singles W–L–H	Foursomes W–L–H	Fourballs W–L–H	Points won	Points %
Career	36	18–12–6	2–4–3	7–5–2	9–3–1	21.0	58.3
2002	3	1–1–1	0–0–1 halved with M. Redman	1–1–0 won w/ H. Alfredsson 4&2, lost w/ H. Alfredsson 3&1		1.5	50.0
2003	5	4–1–0	0–1–0 lost to C. Kerr 1 dn	2–0–0 won w/ A. Sörenstam 4&3, won w/ S. Gustafson 3&1	2–0–0 won w/ P. Meunier-Lebouc 3&2, won w/ A. Sörenstam 1 up	4.0	80.0
2005	4	2–0–2	0–0–1 halved w/ R. Jones	1–0–0 won w/ A. Sörenstam 1 up,	1–0–1 won w/ L. Davies 4&3, halved w/ S. Gustafson	3.0	75.0
2007	4	1–1–2	0–1–0 lost to S. Prammanasudh 2 up	0–0–2 halved w/ S. Gustafson, halved w/ S. Gustafson	1–0–0 won w/ A. Sörenstam 3&2	2.0	50.0
2009	5	1–4–0	0–1–0 lost to P. Creamer 3&2	0–2–0 lost w/ S. Gustafson 4&2, lost w/ H. Alfredsson 2 dn	1–1–0 lost w/ S. Gustafson 1 dn, won w/ A. Nordqvist 1 up	1.0	20.0
2011	4	3–1–0	1–0–0 defeated M. Wie 1 up	1–0–0 won w/ S. Gustafson 1 up	1–1–0 won w/ A. Nordqvist 2 up, lost w/ C. Hedwall 1 dn	3.0	75.0
2013	4	2–1–1	0–0–1 halved with L. Salas	1–1–0 won w/ B. Recari 2&1 lost w/ B. Recari 2&1	1–0–0 won w/ C. Ciganda 1 up	2.5	62.5
2015	4	2–2–0	0–1–0 lost to A. Stanford 2&1	1–1–0 lost w/ A. Nordqvist 3&2, won w/ C. Hull 1 up	1–0–0 won w/ C. Hull 2 up	2.0	50.0
2019	3	2–1–0	1–0–0 def. M. Alex 1 up		1–1–0 won w/ A. van Dam 4&2, lost w/ A. van Dam 1 dn	2.0	66.7

=== As captain ===
Professional

- Solheim Cup (representing Europe): 2023 (tied, cup retained), 2024

== See also ==
- List of golfers with most LPGA major championship wins
- List of golfers with most LPGA Tour wins
