= Song-Hee Kim =

South Korean golfer

Song-Hee Kim 김송희
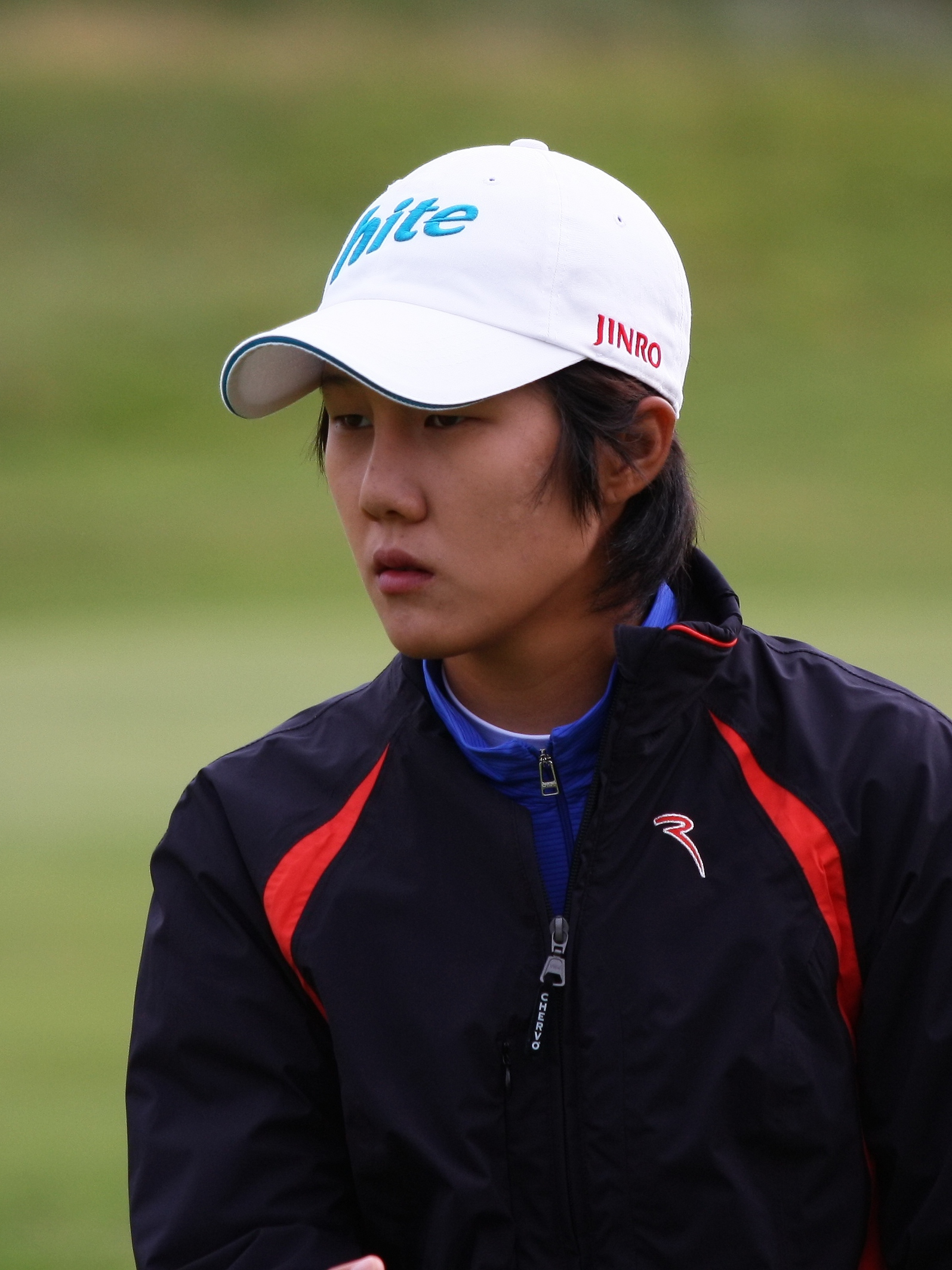
- Kim at the 2010 Women's British Open

Personal information
- Nationality: South Korea
- Born: 16 July 1988 (age 38) Seoul, South Korea
- Height: 1.75 m (5 ft 9 in)

Career
- Sport: Golf
- College: Yonsei University
- Turned professional: 2006
- Current tour: LPGA Tour (joined 2007)
- Former tour: Futures Tour (joined 2006)
- Professional wins: 5

Number of wins by tour
- Epson Tour: 5

Best results in LPGA major championships
- Chevron Championship: 3rd: 2010
- Women's PGA C'ship: 2nd: 2010
- U.S. Women's Open: 12th: 2009
- Women's British Open: T11: 2009

Achievements and awards
- Futures Tour Rookie of the Year: 2006
- Futures Tour Player of the Year: 2006

Song-Hee Kim (Korean: 김송희, born 16 July 1988) is a South Korean professional golfer who played on the United States–based LPGA Tour.

== Professional wins (5) ==
=== Futures Tour (5) ===
- 2006 (5) Louisiana Pelican Classic, IOS Golf Classic, Aurora Health Care Championship, CIGNA Chip in For A Cure FUTURES Golf Classic, The Gettysburg Championship

== Results in LPGA majors ==
Tournament	2007	2008	2009	2010	2011	2012
Kraft Nabisco Championship			T21	3	T33	CUT
LPGA Championship	CUT	CUT	T9	2	CUT	CUT
U.S. Women's Open	T50	T24	12	13	T34	
Women's British Open		CUT	T11	T19	T14	

Top 10
Did not play

CUT = missed the half-way cut
T = tied

== LPGA Tour career summary ==
Year	Tournaments played	Cuts made	Wins	2nd	3rd	Top 10s	Best finish	Earnings ($)	Money list rank	Scoring average	Scoring rank
2007	19	10	0	0	0	0	T22	78,660	99	73.72	75
2008	25	21	0	2	1	7	2	980,883	14	71.23	10
2009	25	23	0	0	2	12	T3	1,032,031	11	70.52	8
2010	22	22	0	2	3	15	2	1,208,698	8	70.21	4
2011	22	19	0	1	0	2	2	350,376	33	72.62	47
2012	11	3	0	0	0	0	T33	10,872	145	76.86	139
2013	10	2	0	0	0	0	T43	11,668	139	73.73	126

- Official as of the 2013 season

== Team appearances ==
Amateur

- Espirito Santo Trophy (representing South Korea): 2004

Professional

- Lexus Cup (representing Asia team): 2008
