= Azahara Muñoz =

Spanish professional golfer (born 1987)

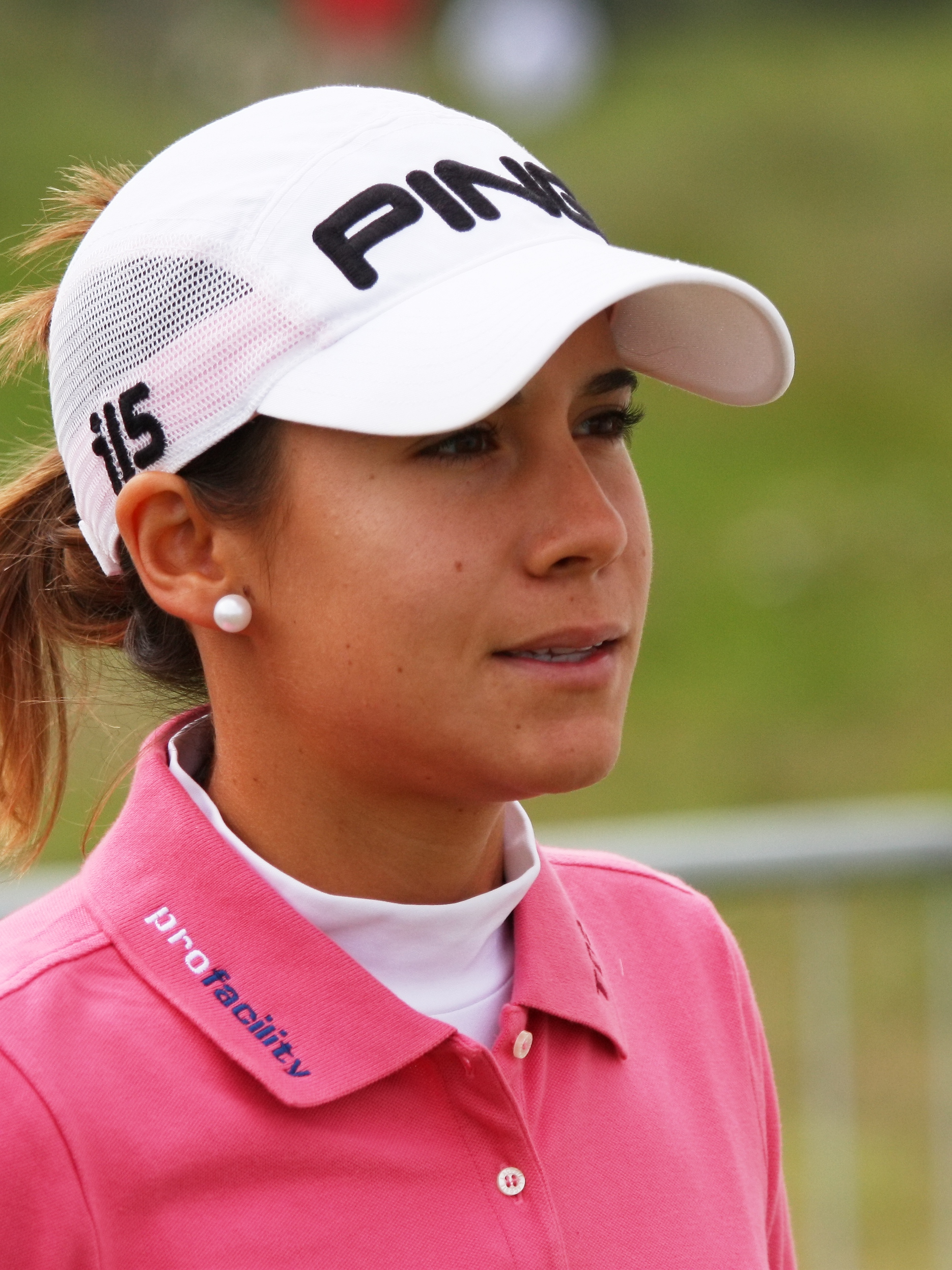
- Muñoz at the 2010 Women's British Open

Personal information
- Full name: Azahara Muñoz Guijarro
- Nickname: Aza
- Nationality: Spain
- Born: 19 November 1987 (age 38) Málaga, Spain
- Height: 1.64 m (5 ft 5 in)

Career
- Sport: Golf
- College: Arizona State University
- Turned professional: 2009
- Current tours: LPGA Tour (joined 2010); Ladies European Tour (joined 2009)
- Professional wins: 6

Number of wins by tour
- LPGA Tour: 1
- Ladies European Tour: 5

Best results in LPGA major championships
- Chevron Championship: T7: 2014
- Women's PGA C'ship: T4: 2014
- U.S. Women's Open: T19: 2010
- Women's British Open: T12: 2014
- Evian Championship: T19: 2013

Achievements and awards
- LPGA Tour Rookie of the Year: 2010
Medal record
Mediterranean Games
Gold medal – first place	2009 Pescara	Individual
Gold medal – first place	2009 Pescara	Women's team

Azahara Muñoz Guijarro (born 19 November 1987) is a Spanish professional golfer on the U.S.-based LPGA Tour and Ladies European Tour.

== Amateur career ==
Muñoz was born in Málaga, Andalusia in southern Spain and had a successful amateur career in both Europe and the United States. She won the 2002 Spanish Amateur title at age 14, the 2004 Girls Amateur Championship, and was the 2009 British Ladies Amateur champion. Additionally, she was runner-up to Amanda Blumenherst at the 2008 U.S. Women's Amateur in Eugene, Oregon, and was a member of Europe's Junior Solheim Cup Team in 2002, 2003, and 2005.

At Arizona State, she was the 2008 NCAA Individual Champion in her junior year, winning by making a 25-foot (8 m) putt at the first hole of a playoff against UCLA's Tiffany Joh in Albuquerque, New Mexico. Surgery on her right wrist in January 2009 sidelined her for over a month during her senior year. In May, Muñoz finished fourth at the NCAA Championships in Maryland to lead the Sun Devils to the 2009 NCAA team title. She was the Edith Cummings Munson Award recipient in 2008 & 2009, the only double winner of the award. Muñoz was also 2006–08 NGCA Academic All-American, 2006–09 First-Team All-Pac-10, 2006–07 NGCA Second-Team All-American, 2009 NGCA All-American and 2009 Pac-10 Scholar of the Year. She graduated magna cum laude from ASU in May 2009 with a bachelor's degree in psychology and a minor in business.

In a final summer of amateur play, Muñoz won the match-play British Ladies Amateur in Wales over ASU teammate and compatriot Carlota Ciganda, then won gold medals (individual & team) for Spain at the 2009 Mediterranean Games in Italy. Although the runner-up in 2008, she opted not to participate in the 2009 U.S. Women's Amateur. She played in three professional majors as an amateur in 2009 and placed T-40 twice.

== Professional career ==
=== 2009 ===
Muñoz turned professional in September 2009, two weeks prior to the first stage of the LPGA Tour Qualifying Tournament in California, in which she finished second and advanced to the final stage in December.

Back in Spain, she received a sponsor's exemption into the 2009 Madrid Ladies Masters, and made her professional debut on 1 October on the Ladies European Tour (LET). After shooting a 64 (−9) in the final round, she won the three-round event on the first playoff hole, defeating former ASU teammate Anna Nordqvist with an eagle putt; Muñoz earned €50,000 and a three-year LET exemption.

Following a rain-shortened one-round victory in Barcelona for €5,000 on the Banesto mini-tour in late October, Muñoz finished fifth at the LPGA Final Qualifying Tournament in December in Florida to earn full playing privileges on the LPGA Tour for 2010. She ended the year ranked 179th in the Women's World Golf Rankings.

=== 2010 ===
In her rookie season of 2010, Muñoz made the cut in her first eleven events, and won over $402,000 in LPGA competition with two top ten finishes. She made the top twenty in the three majors she played, was 30th on the money list, and 17th in scoring. Muñoz handily won the competition for LPGA Tour Rookie of the Year with 704 points; the runner-up was compatriot Beatriz Recari with 419.

She won an additional €26,380 in five events on the Ladies European Tour (total 2010 LET earnings were €96,633 in seven events, with €70,253 from the two events co-sanctioned by the LPGA). Muñoz ended the year at 41st in the world rankings.

=== 2012 ===
Muñoz notched her first LPGA Tour victory at the Sybase Match Play Championship in Gladstone, New Jersey with a 2 and 1 victory over Candie Kung. In the semifinal round of match play against Morgan Pressel, Muñoz trailed by two through 11 holes. Pressel appeared to have won the 12th hole, which would have given her a three-hole lead over Muñoz, but a slow-play penalty was ruled against Pressel. Muñoz ended up winning the semifinal match against Pressel, 2 and 1. The victory in May vaulted Muñoz from 27th to 19th in the world rankings and from tenth to second on the 2012 money list.

== Professional wins (6) ==
=== LPGA Tour (1) ===
No.	Date	Tournament	Winning score	To par	Margin of victory	Runner-up	Winner's share ($)
1	20 May 2012	Sybase Match Play Championship	2 and 1			(United States) Candie Kung	375,000

LPGA Tour playoff record (0–2)

No.	Year	Tournament	Opponent	Result
1	2014	HSBC Women's Champions	(United States) Paula Creamer	Lost to eagle on second extra hole
2	2020	Aberdeen Standard Investments Ladies Scottish Open	(United States) Cheyenne Knight (United States) Stacy Lewis (Denmark) Emily Kristine Pedersen	Lewis won with birdie on first extra hole

=== Ladies European Tour (5) ===
No.	Date	Tournament	Winning score	To par	Margin of victory	Runner(s)-up	Winner's share (€)
1	3 Oct 2009	Madrid Ladies Masters	71-68-64=203	−16	Playoff^{1}	(Sweden) Anna Nordqvist	50,000
2	29 Sep 2013	Lacoste Ladies Open de France	68-65-68-65=266	−14	1 stroke	(France) Valentine Derrey (France) Gwladys Nocera	37,500
3	5 Oct 2014	Lacoste Ladies Open de France (2)	67-68-67-67=269	−11	1 stroke	(Wales) Amy Boulden (Spain) María Hernández	37,500
4	25 Sep 2016	Andalucia Costa Del Sol Open De España	72-66-70-70=278	−10	1 stroke	(United States) Beth Allen	45,000
5	24 Sep 2017	Andalucia Costa Del Sol Open De España Femenino (2)	69-64-67-69=269	−19	2 strokes	(Spain) Carlota Ciganda (South Africa) Lee-Anne Pace	45,000

^{1} Muñoz sank an eagle putt on the first playoff hole to win.

== Results in LPGA majors ==
Results not in chronological order.

Tournament	2009	2010	2011	2012	2013	2014	2015	2016	2017	2018	2019	2020	2021	2022	2023	2024	2025	2026
Chevron Championship	T40		T52	T15	CUT	T7		T56	T27	T20	T68	T69	T28			CUT		
U.S. Women's Open	T40	T19	T45	T21	T48	T22	T32	CUT	62	T41	T55	T54	CUT		T33			
Women's PGA Championship		T11	T8	CUT	CUT	T4	T53	T30	CUT	CUT	T37	CUT	CUT		CUT	T70	T29	CUT
The Evian Championship ^					T19	T24	CUT	72	T48	T33	CUT	NT	CUT			CUT	T59	
Women's British Open	CUT	T19	T49	CUT	CUT	T12	T50	T17	T23	T47	T41	T39	CUT					

^ The Evian Championship was added as a major in 2013

Top 10
Did not play

CUT = missed the half-way cut
NT = no tournament
T = tied

=== Summary ===
Tournament	Wins	2nd	3rd	Top-5	Top-10	Top-25	Events	Cuts made
Chevron Championship	0	0	0	0	1	3	12	10
U.S. Women's Open	0	0	0	0	0	3	14	12
Women's PGA Championship	0	0	0	1	2	3	16	8
The Evian Championship	0	0	0	0	0	2	10	6
Women's British Open	0	0	0	0	0	4	13	9
Totals	0	0	0	1	3	15	65	45

- Most consecutive cuts made – 9 (2013 Evian – 2015 British Open)
- Longest streak of top-10s – 1 (three times)

== LPGA Tour career summary ==
Year	Tournaments played	Cuts made*	Wins	2nd	3rd	Top 10s	Best finish	Earnings ($)	Money list rank	Scoring average	Scoring rank
2009	3	2	0	0	0	0	T40	n/a	n/a	75.00	n/a
2010	21	17	0	0	0	2	T4	402,497	30	71.29	17
2011	23	21	0	1	1	3	T2	520,269	24	72.11	30
2012	26	22	1	2	1	9	1	1,230,751	8	70.90	9
2013	26	21	0	1	0	3	2	457,996	31	71.50	28
2014	27	26	0	2	0	10	2	1,051,332	9	70.47	8
2015	23	21	0	0	1	5	T3	504,100	32	71.28	23
2016	27	24	0	0	0	5	T5	440,802	43	71.34	37
2017	26	21	0	0	0	0	T15	286,417	63	71.47	61
2018	26	24	0	1	0	2	2	568,975	38	71.27	37
2019	26	25	0	1	1	7	T2	667,184	30	70.53	21
2020	14	10	0	1	0	1	T2	181,537	64	72.13	74
2021	22	14	0	0	0	0	T17	141,267	95	71.45	74
2022	4	4	0	0	0	0	T32	35,943	159	69.86	n/a
2023	19	10	0	1	0	2	T2	441,598	67	71.52	75
2024	21	11	0	0	0	0	T12	151,072	110	72.46	129
2025	17	8	0	0	0	1	T5	219,791	102	71.79	95

Official through 2025 season
* Includes matchplay and other events without a cut.

== World ranking ==
Position in Women's World Golf Rankings at the end of each calendar year.

Year	World ranking	Source
2009	179	
2010	41	
2011	40	
2012	16	
2013	31	
2014	14	
2015	30	
2016	50	
2017	72	
2018	54	
2019	43	
2020	69	
2021	143	
2022	282	
2023	90	
2024	160	
2025	245	

== Team appearances ==
Amateur

- European Girls' Team Championship (representing Spain): 2001 (winners), 2002 (winners), 2003 (winners), 2004, 2005
- Junior Solheim Cup (representing Europe): 2002, 2003 (winners), 2005
- European Lady Junior's Team Championship (representing Spain): 2006
- Espirito Santo Trophy (representing Spain): 2006, 2008
- European Ladies' Team Championship (representing Spain): 2007 (winners), 2008

Professional

- Solheim Cup (representing Europe): 2011 (winners), 2013 (winners), 2015, 2019 (winners)
- International Crown (representing Spain): 2014 (winners)

=== Solheim Cup record ===
Year	Total matches	Total W–L–H	Singles W–L–H	Foursomes W–L–H	Fourballs W–L–H	Points won	Points %
Career	16	6–8–2	1–3–0	4–2–1	1–3–1	7	43.8
2011	4	2–1–1	1–0–0 def. A. Stanford 1 up	1–0–1 won w/ C. Matthew 3&2, halved w/ C. Matthew	0–1–0 lost w/ M. Hjorth 3&1	2.5	62.5
2013	4	2–2–0	0–1–0 lost to B. Lang 2&1	1–1–0 won w/ K. Icher 2&1, lost w/ K. Icher 1dn	1–0–0 won w/ C. Ciganda 1 up	2	50
2015	3	0–3–0	0–1–0 lost to L. Salas 3&1	0–1–0 lost w/ K. Icher 2&1	0–1–0 lost w/ C. Ciganda 3&2	0	0
2019	5	2–2–1	0–1–0 lost to A. Yin 2&1	2–0–0 won w/ C. Hull 2&1 won w/ C. Hull 4&3	0–1–1 halved w/ C. Hull lost w/ C. Ciganda 2&1	2.5	50.0
