= 2012 U.S. Women's Open =

Coordinates: 43.726°N 87.774°W

Tournament information
- Dates: July 5–8, 2012
- Location: Kohler, Wisconsin
- Courses: Blackwolf Run; Original Championship Course
- Organized by: USGA
- Tour: LPGA Tour

Statistics
- Par: 72
- Length: 6,954 yards (6,359 m)
- Field: 156 players, 65 after cut
- Cut: 149 (+5)
- Prize fund: $3.25 million
- Winner's share: $585,000

Champion
- (South Korea) Na Yeon Choi
- 281 (−7)

Location in the United States
Location in Wisconsin

The 2012 U.S. Women's Open was the 67th U.S. Women's Open, held July 5–8 at Blackwolf Run in Kohler, Wisconsin. Na Yeon Choi won her first major championship, four strokes ahead of runner-up Amy Yang.

The U.S. Women's Open is the oldest major championship and the third of the 2012 season. It has the largest purse in women's golf, at $3.25 million in 2012. It is one of 13 national championships conducted by the United States Golf Association (USGA). Qualifying tournaments began on May 14, 2012, and concluded on June 3, 2012. The tournament was televised by ESPN and NBC Sports.

Blackwolf Run previously hosted the U.S. Women's Open in 1998 with Se Ri Pak beating amateur Jenny Chuasiriporn in a Monday playoff that went to 20 holes. Their 72-hole score was 290 (+6), played on a par-71 course at 6,412 yards (5,863 m). The course for 2012 was set as a par-72 with a maximum length of 6,954 yards (6,359 m), an increase of 542 yards (496 m). The course was set at less than the maximum for all four rounds.

== Qualifying and field ==
The championship was open to any female professional or amateur golfer with a USGA handicap index not exceeding 4.4. Players qualified by competing in one of nineteen 36-hole qualifying tournaments that tare taking place between May 14 and June 3 at sites across the United States. Additional players were exempt from qualifying because of past performances in professional or amateur tournaments around the world.

The USGA reports that a record 1,364 entries were received for the Championship, surpassing the previous record of 1,296 entries for the 2010 U.S. Women's Open.

=== Exempt from qualifying ===
Many players were exempt in multiple categories. Players are listed only once, in the first category in which they became exempt, with additional categories in parentheses ( ) next to their names. Golfers qualifying in Category 12 who qualify by more than one method are also denoted with the tour by which they qualified.

1. Winners of the U.S. Women's Open for the last ten years (2002–2011)
Juli Inkster (9), Paula Creamer (9,13), Eun-Hee Ji (9), Cristie Kerr (5,8,9,13), Birdie Kim, Inbee Park (8,9), So Yeon Ryu (9,10,11,12,13)
Exempt but did not enter tournament: Hilary Lunke, Meg Mallon, Annika Sörenstam

2. Winner and runner-up from the 2011 U.S. Women's Amateur Championship (must be an amateur)
Moriya Jutanugarn (runner-up) (The winner, Danielle Kang, turned professional in August 2011 and was no longer exempt. Kang entered the City of Industry qualifying tournament on May 29 where she earned the third of four available spots from that location.)

3. Winner of the 2012 Ladies British Open Amateur Championship (must be an amateur)
Stephanie Meadow

4. Winner of the 2011 Mark H. McCormack Medal (Women's World Amateur Golf Ranking) (must be an amateur)
Lydia Ko

5. Winners of the LPGA Championship for the last five years (2008–2012)
Anna Nordqvist (9), Yani Tseng (6,7,9,10,11,13)

6. Winners of the Ricoh Women's British Open for the last five years (2007–2011)
Catriona Matthew (9,11,13), Jiyai Shin (8,9,10) (withdrew because of injury)
Exempt but did not enter tournament: Lorena Ochoa (7)

7. Winners of the Kraft Nabisco Championship for the last five years (2008–2012)
Stacy Lewis (9,10,11,13), Brittany Lincicome (9,11,13), Sun-Young Yoo (9,10,11,13)

8. 10 lowest scorers and anyone tying for 10th place from the 2011 U.S. Women's Open Championship
I.K. Kim (9,13), Ai Miyazato (9,10,11,12,13), Mika Miyazato (9), Hee Kyung Seo (9), Angela Stanford (9,10,11,13), Ryann O'Toole (9), Amy Yang (9,13), Karrie Webb (9,13)

9. Top 70 money leaders from the 2011 final official LPGA money list
Kyeong Bae, Amanda Blumenherst, Christel Boeljon, Chella Choi, Na Yeon Choi (10,11,13), Shanshan Feng (5,10,11,13), Katie Futcher, Sandra Gal, Julieta Granada, Natalie Gulbis, Sophie Gustafson, Hee-Won Han, Mina Harigae, Caroline Hedwall (12,13), Maria Hjorth, Katherine Hull, Amy Hung, Pat Hurst, Vicky Hurst, Tiffany Joh, Jennifer Johnson, Jimin Kang, Christina Kim, Mindy Kim, Song-Hee Kim (withdrew) Candie Kung, Cindy LaCrosse, Brittany Lang (11), Meena Lee, Paige Mackenzie, Kristy McPherson, Becky Morgan, Belen Mozo, Azahara Muñoz (10,11), Se Ri Pak, Hee Young Park (11), Suzann Pettersen (11,13), Gerina Piller, Pornanong Phatlum, Stacy Prammanasudh, Morgan Pressel (13), Beatriz Recari, Dewi Claire Schreefel, Jenny Shin, Karen Stupples, Momoko Ueda (11), Wendy Ward, Michelle Wie (13)
Exempt but did not enter tournament: Mi Hyun Kim, Heather Bowie Young

10. Top 10 money leaders from the 2012 official LPGA money list, through the close of entries on May 2 (must have filed an entry by May 2)
All players in this category already qualified in at least one other category

11. Winners of LPGA co-sponsored events, whose victories are considered official, from the conclusion of the 2011 U.S. Women's Open Championship to the initiation of the 2012 U.S. Women's Open Championship
Jessica Korda, Lexi Thompson (13)

12. Top five money leaders from the 2011 Japan LPGA Tour, Korea LPGA Tour and Ladies European Tour
Japan LPGA Tour: Sun-Ju Ahn (13) (withdrew) Chie Arimura (13) (declined to participate), Yukari Baba, Ji-Hee Lee, (13), Sakura Yokomine (13)
Korea LPGA Tour: Kim Ha-neul (declined to participate), Hyun Hwa Sim, Soo Jin Yang, Yeon Ju Jung
Ladies European Tour: Diana Luna, Lee-Anne Pace, Melissa Reid,

13. Top 25 point leaders from the current Rolex Rankings and anyone tying for 25th place as of May 2, 2012
All players in this category already qualified in at least one other category

14. Top 25 point leaders from the current Rolex Rankings and anyone tying for 25th place as of July 2, 2012
Jeon Mi-jeong (declined to participate in tournament)

15. Special exemptions selected by the USGA
None offered

=== Qualifiers ===
The following players qualified for the 2012 U.S. Women's Open through one of the sectional qualifying tournaments. At sites with multiple qualifiers, players are listed in order of qualifying scores, from lowest score to highest.

May 14 at Bellingham Golf and Country Club, Bellingham, Washington
Sue Kim, Emma Talley

May 15 at Plantation Bay Golf & Country Club, Ormond Beach, Florida
Katie Burnett, Veronica Felibert, Jennifer Gleason, Jaye Marie Green

May 15 at Trump National Golf Club, Colts Neck, New Jersey
Annie Park, Seon Hwa Lee, Jeong Jang, Mi Jung Hur, Jennie Lee, Jennifer Song

May 21 at Longmeadow Country Club, Longmeadow, Massachusetts
Alison Walshe, Megan Khang

May 21 at Waialae Country Club, Honolulu, Hawaii
Mina Nakayama

May 21 at Half Moon Bay Golf Links (Ocean Course), Half Moon Bay, California
Gigi Stoll, Hannah O'Sullivan, Mo Martin

May 21 at Big Foot Country Club, Fontana, Wisconsin
Carlota Ciganda, Junthima Gulyanamitta

May 21 at Dunwoody Country Club, Dunwoody, Georgia
Victoria Tanco, Cydney Clanton, Mi Hyang Lee, Jin Young Pak

May 22 at The Woodlands Country Club (Player Course), The Woodlands, Texas
Maria Gabriela Lopez, Katy Harris, Lili Alvarez

May 23 at Terravita Golf Club, Scottsdale, Arizona
Lizette Salas, Lindsey Weaver, Nicole Castrale, Jane Rah

May 29 at Industry Hills Golf Club (Eisenhower Course and Zaharias Course), City of Industry, California
Brianna Do, Jisoo Park, Elizabeth Bernabe, Danielle Kang

May 29 at The Oaks Club (Eagle Course), Osprey, Florida
Doris Chen, Paola Moreno, Haley Wilson

May 29 at Woodmont Country Club, Rockville, Maryland
Lorie Kane, Haru Nomura, Brittany Altomare, Ilhee Lee, Samantha S Marks, Angela Oh, Kelly Shon

May 29 at Wayzata Country Club, Wayzata, Minnesota
Briana Mao

May 29 at Glen Echo Country Club, St. Louis, Missouri
Isabelle Beisiegel, Brooke Pancake

May 30 at Carolina Trace Country Club (Lake Course), Sanford, North Carolina
Katherine Perry, Cheyenne Woods, Rinko Mitsunaga

May 30 at Fox Chapel Golf Club, Pittsburgh, Pennsylvania
Giulia Sergas, Christine Meier

May 30 at Stonebriar Country Club (Fazio Course), Frisco, Texas
Gabriella Dominguez, Tessa Teachman, Jamie Hullett

June 3 at Broadmoor Golf Club (West Course), Colorado Springs, Colorado
Becca Huffer, Kelly Jacques, Anya Sarai Alvarez

=== Alternates added to field ===
Kyung Kim, the first alternate from the Scottsdale, Arizona qualifier, was added to the field on June 12 when Jiyai Shin, who had qualified in multiple categories, withdrew because of injury.

Alison Lee, the first alternate from the Half Moon Bay, California qualifier, was added to the field on June 29 when Sun Ju Ahn, who had qualified from the JLPGA money list, withdrew.

Jisoo Keel, the first alternate from the Colorado Springs qualifier, was added to the field on July 2 when Jeon Mi-jeong who qualified by moving into the top 25 in the Rolex Rankings by that date (exemption category 14) declined to participate in the tournament.

The following players were added to the field on July 2 when spots reserved for players qualifying in various categories, including 5, 10, 11, 12 and 14, after the conclusion of open qualifying tournaments, were not used.

- Ashley Armstrong, the first alternate from the St. Louis qualifier
- Shannon Aubert, the alternate from the Ormond Beach qualifier
- Kylene Pulley, the first alternate from the Sanford, North Carolina qualifier
- Reilley Rankin, the first alternate from the Dunwoody, Georgia qualifier
- Jenny Suh, the first alternate from the Fairfax, Virginia qualifier
- Angel Yin, the first alternate from the City of Industry qualifier

Cathryn Bristow, the second alternate from the Frisco, Texas qualifier, was added to the field on July 5 when Song-Hee Kim who qualified in category 9, withdrew citing a sore back and neck.

== Course layout ==
Original Championship Course

Hole	1	2	3	4	5	6	7	8	9	Out	10	11	12	13	14	15	16	17	18	In	Total
Yards	348	522	455	341	409	200	590	180	395	3,440	564	375	447	195	342	372	602	172	445	3,514	6,954
Par	4	5	4	4	4	3	5	3	4	36	5	4	4	3	4	4	5	3	4	36	72

- "Original Championship Course" uses the back nine from Meadow Valleys for its front nine, and the first four and final five holes from River for its back nine.

== Round summaries ==
=== First round ===
Thursday, July 5, 2012

Place	Player	Score	To par
T1	(United States) Cristie Kerr	69	−3
T1	(United States) Brittany Lincicome	69	−3
T1	(United States) Lizette Salas	69	−3
T4	(Spain) Beatriz Recari	70	−2
T4	(Japan) Ai Miyazato	70	−2
T4	(United States) Lexi Thompson	70	−2
T4	(United States) Jennie Lee	70	−2
T8	(South Korea) Meena Lee	71	−1
T8	(Germany) Sandra Gal	71	−1
T8	(South Korea) Inbee Park	71	−1
T8	(Japan) Mika Miyazato	71	−1
T8	(United States) Vicky Hurst	71	−1
T8	(South Korea) Na Yeon Choi	71	−1
T8	(Norway) Suzann Pettersen	71	−1

=== Second round ===
Friday, July 6, 2012

Place	Player	Score	To par
1	(Norway) Suzann Pettersen	71-68=139	−5
T2	(United States) Michelle Wie	74-66=140	−4
T2	(United States) Cristie Kerr	69-71=140	−4
T4	(United States) Vicky Hurst	71-70=141	−3
T4	(South Korea) Inbee Park	71-70=141	−3
T4	(Germany) Sandra Gal	71-70=141	−3
T7	(Japan) Mika Miyazato	71-71=142	−2
T7	(United States) Lizette Salas	69-73=142	−2
T9	(United States) Nicole Castrale	73-70=143	−1
T9	(South Korea) Na Yeon Choi	71-72=143	−1
T9	(United States) Lexi Thompson	70-73=143	−1

Amateurs: Ko (+2), Talley (+4), Lee (+5), Kim (+6), Bernabe (+9), Chen (+9), Green (+9), Altomare (+10), Dominguez (+10), O'Sullivan (+10), J. Park (+10), Khang (+11), Perry (+11), Shon (+11), Jutanugarn (+13), Keel (+15), Lopez (+15), Weaver (+16), Aubert (+17), Meadow (+17), Armstrong (+18), Meier (+20), A. Park (+21), Yin (+21), Mao (+22), Marks (+22), Mitsunaga (+24), Stoll (+26).

=== Third round ===
Saturday, July 7, 2012

Place	Player	Score	To par
1	(South Korea) Na Yeon Choi	71-72-65=208	−8
2	(South Korea) Amy Yang	73-72-69=214	−2
T3	(United States) Lexi Thompson	70-73-72=215	−1
T3	(Japan) Mika Miyazato	71-71-73=215	−1
T3	(Germany) Sandra Gal	71-70-74=215	−1
6	(United States) Vicky Hurst	71-70-75=216	E
T7	(United States) Paula Creamer	73-73-71=217	+1
T7	(United States) Nicole Castrale	73-70-74=217	+1
T7	(United States) Lizette Salas	69-73-74=217	+1
T7	(South Korea) Inbee Park	71-70-76=217	+1
T7	(United States) Cristie Kerr	69-71-77=217	+1
T7	(Norway) Suzann Pettersen	71-68-78=217	+1

=== Final round ===
Sunday, July 8, 2012

Place	Player	Score	To par	Money ($)
1	(South Korea) Na Yeon Choi	71-72-65-73=281	−7	585,000
2	(South Korea) Amy Yang	73-72-69-71=285	−3	350,000
3	(Germany) Sandra Gal	71-70-74-74=289	+1	218,840
T4	(South Korea) Ilhee Lee	72-71-77-70=290	+2	128,487
T4	(China) Shanshan Feng	74-74-71-71=290	+2	128,487
T4	(Italy) Giulia Sergas	74-71-73-72=290	+2	128,487
T7	(United States) Paula Creamer	73-73-71-74=291	+3	94,736
T7	(Japan) Mika Miyazato	71-71-73-76=291	+3	94,736
T9	(South Korea) Se Ri Pak	72-73-76-71=292	+4	72,596
T9	(United States) Nicole Castrale	73-70-74-75=292	+4	72,596
T9	(South Korea) Inbee Park	71-70-76-75=292	+4	72,596
T9	(United States) Cristie Kerr	69-71-77-75=292	+4	72,596
T9	(Norway) Suzann Pettersen	71-68-78-75=292	+4	72,596

Amateurs: Ko (+12), Talley (+13), Lee (+18).

==== Scorecard ====
Final round

Hole	1	2	3	4	5	6	7	8	9	10	11	12	13	14	15	16	17	18
Par	4	5	4	4	4	3	5	3	4	5	4	4	3	4	4	5	3	4
(South Korea) Choi	−7	−7	−7	−8	−8	−8	−8	−8	−8	−5	−6	−6	−6	−6	−7	−8	−8	−7
(South Korea) Yang	−1	−1	−1	−2	−2	−2	−2	−2	−3	−3	−3	−3	−3	−2	−3	−3	−3	−3
(Germany) Gal	E	−1	−1	−1	−1	−1	−1	−1	E	−1	−1	−1	+2	+1	+1	+1	+1	+1
(South Korea) Lee	+4	+3	+3	+3	+3	+3	+2	+2	+1	E	+1	+1	+2	+2	+3	+2	+2	+2
(China) Feng	+4	+4	+3	+3	+3	+3	+3	+3	+3	+3	+2	+2	+3	+3	+3	+3	+3	+2
(Italy) Sergas	+2	+2	+3	+2	+1	+3	+2	+2	+3	+2	+2	+3	+3	+3	+3	+2	+2	+2

Cumulative tournament scores, relative to par

Birdie	Bogey	Double bogey	Triple bogey+
