= 2011 Solheim Cup =

Women's team golf competition

- Dates: 23–25 September 2011
- Venue: Killeen Castle
- Location: County Meath, Ireland
- Captains: Alison Nicholas (Europe); Rosie Jones (USA)
| (Europe) | 15 | 13 | (United States) |
- Europe wins the Solheim Cup

Location map
- Location within Europe Location within Ireland

The 2011 Solheim Cup was the 12th Solheim Cup matches, held 23–25 September in Ireland at Killeen Castle in County Meath, northwest of Dublin. The biennial matches are a three-day contest for professional female golfers, between teams of 12 top players from the United States and Europe. Entering the 2011 matches, the U.S. had won the three recent competitions, with Europe's last victory coming eight years earlier in 2003 in Sweden.

After the first two days of team play, the competition was tied at 8-all. Europe went 7–5 in singles on Sunday and regained the Cup, 15–13. It was Europe's fourth win, all won on home soil.

== Format ==
The Solheim Cup is a match play event, with each match worth one point. The format is as follows

- Day 1 (Friday): Four foursome (alternate shot) matches in a morning session and four fourball (better ball) matches in an afternoon session. A total of eight players from each team participate.
- Day 2 (Saturday): Four foursome matches in a morning session and four fourball matches in an afternoon session. A total of eight players from each team participate.
- Day 3 (Sunday): 12 singles matches. All 12 players from each team participate.

With a total of 28 points, 14 1/2 points are required to win the Cup, and 14 points are required for the defending champion to retain the Cup. All matches are played to a maximum of 18 holes. If the score is even after 18 holes, each team earns one-half-point.

== Teams ==
=== Eligibility criteria ===
The European and United States teams have different eligibility criteria.

Members of the European Tour must be current members of the Ladies European Tour and must be "a European national," defined by Solheim Cup rules as someone:

Either:
(i) born in a European country; and
(ii) holds a current passport of that European country;
Or:
(i) has been naturalised as a citizen of a European country;
(ii) has held a current passport of that European country for the immediately preceding four (4) consecutive years;
(iii) has resided in that European country for the immediately preceding four (4) consecutive years.

A European country is a nation situated in the continent of Europe and is recognised as an independent state by the United Nations.

Any player who holds dual nationality (of which one shall be the nationality of a European country) shall elect on joining the Ladies European Tour in each of 2010 and 2011 whether she wishes to be eligible for selection for the 2011 European Solheim Cup Team.

Members of the United States team must be current members of the LPGA Tour and be born in the United States.

=== Team selection ===
The European and United States teams are selected by different methods.

Team Europe was selected by taking the top four players from the LET Solheim Cup standings, followed by the top four Ladies European Tour members on the Women's World Golf Rankings as of 29 August 2011, were not already qualified via the Solheim Cup standings, and four captain's selections. Qualifying points for Team Europe were awarded weekly to the top-10 finishers at official LET events.

Team USA qualified by earning points for wins and for top-20 finishes on the LPGA Tour over a two-year period. Points were earned beginning with the 2009 Safeway Classic and concluding with the 2011 Women's British Open. Points were increased in 2011 and doubled in the four major tournaments. The ten players with the highest points were automatically selected for Team USA. Two additional players were selected by captain Rosie Jones before the start of the Matches.

=== Team Europe ===
Team Europe
| Name | Age^{1} | Residence or Hometown^{2} | LET ranking | Rolex ranking | Solheim experience |
| (England) Alison Nicholas; Non-playing captain | 49 | Birmingham, England | | | 1990, 1992, 1994, 1996, 1998, 2000, 2005, 2009-Captain |
| (England) Joanne Morley; Non-playing assistant captain | 44 | Cheshire, England | | | 1996, 2009-Asst. captain |
| (Sweden) Annika Sörenstam; Non-playing assistant captain | 40 | Stockholm, Sweden | | | 1994, 1996, 1998, 2000, 2000, 2002, 2003, 2005, 2007 |
| (England) Melissa Reid | 24 | Derby, England | 1 | 38 | Rookie |
| (England) Laura Davies | 47 | Coventry, England | 2 | 78 | 1990, 1992, 1994, 1996, 1998, 2000, 2002, 2003, 2005, 2007, 2009 |
| (Norway) Suzann Pettersen | 30 | Oslo, Norway | 3 | 2 | 2002, 2003, 2005, 2007, 2009 |
| (Netherlands) Christel Boeljon | 24 | Beverwijk, Netherlands | 4 | 54 | Rookie |
| (Sweden) Maria Hjorth | 35 | Falun, Sweden | 16 | 19 | 2002, 2005, 2007, 2009 |
| (Sweden) Anna Nordqvist | 24 | Eskilstuna, Sweden | 9 | 28 | 2009 |
| (Scotland) Catriona Matthew | 42 | North Berwick, Scotland | 19 | 30 | 1998, 2003, 2005, 2007, 2009 |
| (Sweden) Sophie Gustafson | 37 | Varberg, Sweden | 14 | 37 | 1998, 2000, 2002, 2003, 2005, 2007, 2009 |
| (Spain) Azahara Muñoz; Captain's pick | 23 | Málaga, Spain | 20 | 42 | Rookie |
| (Sweden) Caroline Hedwall; Captain's pick | 22 | Täby, Sweden | 8 | 48 | Rookie |
| (England) Karen Stupples; Captain's pick | 38 | Dover, Kent, England | 32 | 22 | 2005 |
| (Germany) Sandra Gal; Captain's pick | 26 | Düsseldorf, Germany | 72 | 43 | Rookie |

^{1}Age at the start of the 2011 Solheim Cup matches on 23 September 2011.
^{2}Residence/Hometown according to official Solheim Cup designation.
LET rankings as of 20 August 2011
Rolex rankings as of 29 August 2011

=== Team USA ===
Juli Inkster was a player and assistant captain, the first time in Solheim Cup history that an assistant captain was also a player.

Team USA
| Name | Age^{1} | From^{2} | Points rank | Points | Rolex ranking | Solheim experience |
| Rosie Jones; Non-playing captain | 51 | Georgia | | | | 1990, 1996, 1998, 2000, 2002, 2003, 2005 |
| Juli Inkster; Playing assistant captain | 51 | California | 9 | 188.5 | 45 | 1992, 1998, 2000, 2002, 2003, 2005, 2007, 2009 |
| Sherri Steinhauer; Non-playing assistant captain | 48 | Wisconsin | | | | 1994, 1998, 2000, 2007 |
| Cristie Kerr | 33 | Florida | 1 | 750.0 | 2 | 2002, 2003, 2005, 2007, 2009 |
| Stacy Lewis | 26 | Texas | 2 | 467.5 | 11 | Rookie |
| Morgan Pressel | 23 | Florida | 3 | 447.5 | 12 | 2007, 2009 |
| Angela Stanford | 33 | Texas | 4 | 438.5 | 18 | 2003, 2007, 2009 |
| Paula Creamer | 25 | California | 5 | 434.5 | 9 | 2005, 2007, 2009 |
| Michelle Wie | 21 | Hawaii | 6 | 358.0 | 14 | 2009 |
| Brittany Lincicome | 26 | Florida | 7 | 356.5 | 15 | 2007, 2009 |
| Brittany Lang | 26 | Texas | 8 | 293.0 | 33 | 2009 |
| Christina Kim | 27 | California | 10 | 150.5 | 75 | 2005, 2009 |
| Vicky Hurst; Captain's pick | 21 | Florida | 11 | 138.0 | 76 | Rookie |
| Ryann O'Toole; Captain's pick | 24 | California | 18 | 64.5 | 125 | Rookie |

^{1}Age at the start of the 2011 Solheim Cup matches on 23 September 2011.
^{2}Residence/Hometown according to official 2011 Solheim Cup designation.
Rolex rankings as of 21 August 2011. Rolex ranking does not factor into US Team selection. Shown for comparison purposes only.

== Day one ==
Friday, 23 September 2011

=== Morning foursomes ===
| | Results |
|---|---|---|
| Hjorth/Nordqvist | (United States) 2 & 1 | Wie/Kerr |
| Stupples/Reid | (United States) 1 up | Creamer/Lincicome |
| Matthew/Muñoz | (Europe) 3 & 2 | Lewis/Stanford |
| Pettersen/Gustafson | (Europe) 1 up | Lang/Inkster |
| 2 | Session | 2 |
| 2 | Overall | 2 |

=== Afternoon fourball ===
| | Results |
|---|---|---|
| Davies/Reid | (United States) 1 up | Creamer/Pressel |
| Matthew/Gal | halved | Kim/O'Toole |
| Gustafson/Hedwall | (Europe) 5 & 4 | Hurst/Lincicome |
| Pettersen/Nordqvist | (Europe) 2 up | Wie/Kerr |
| 2 1/2 | Session | 1 1/2 |
| 4 1/2 | Overall | 3 1/2 |

== Day two ==
Saturday, 24 September 2011

=== Morning foursomes ===
| | Results |
|---|---|---|
| Hedwall/Gustafson | (Europe) 6 & 5 | Stanford/Lewis |
| Stupples/Boeljon | (United States) 3 & 2 | Pressel/O'Toole |
| Hjorth/Nordqvist | (Europe) 3 & 2 | Lang/Inkster |
| Matthew/Muñoz | halved | Kerr/Creamer |
| 2 1/2 | Session | 1 1/2 |
| 7 | Overall | 5 |

=== Afternoon fourball ===
By winning her match Laura Davies became the leading points scorer in the Solheim Cup with 24.5, passing Annika Sörenstam's record of 24.

| | Results |
|---|---|---|
| Davies/Reid | (Europe) 4 & 3 | Wie/Lang |
| Pettersen/Hedwall | (United States) 1 up | Pressel/Kerr |
| Gal/Boeljon | (United States) 2 & 1 | Lewis/O'Toole |
| Hjorth/Muñoz | (United States) 3 & 1 | Creamer/Lincicome |
| 1 | Session | 3 |
| 8 | Overall | 8 |

== Day three ==
Sunday, 25 September 2011

=== Singles ===
| | Results |
|---|---|---|
| Catriona Matthew | (Europe) 6 & 5 | Paula Creamer |
| Sophie Gustafson | (Europe) 2 up | Stacy Lewis |
| Anna Nordqvist | (United States) 2 & 1 | Morgan Pressel |
| Laura Davies | halved | Juli Inkster |
| Melissa Reid | (United States) 2 up | Vicky Hurst |
| Christel Boeljon | (Europe) 2 up | Brittany Lincicome |
| Sandra Gal | (United States) 6 & 5 | Brittany Lang |
| Maria Hjorth | (United States) 4 & 2 | Christina Kim |
| Suzann Pettersen | (Europe) 1 up | Michelle Wie |
| Caroline Hedwall | halved | Ryann O'Toole |
| Azahara Muñoz | (Europe) 1 up | Angela Stanford |
| Karen Stupples | (Europe) 10 & 8 ^{1} | Cristie Kerr |
| 7 | Session | 5 |
| 15 | Overall | 13 |

^{1} Kerr conceded the match at its start, because of injury. Following Solheim Cup rules, this was a 10 and 8 win for Europe.

== Individual player records ==
Each entry refers to the win–loss–half record of the player.

=== Europe ===
| Player | Points | Overall | Singles | Foursomes | Fourballs |
|---|---|---|---|---|---|
| Christel Boeljon | 1 | 1–2–0 | 1–0–0 | 0–1–0 | 0–1–0 |
| Laura Davies | 1.5 | 1–1–1 | 0–0–1 | 0–0–0 | 1–1–0 |
| Sandra Gal | 0.5 | 0–2–1 | 0–1–0 | 0–0–0 | 0–1–1 |
| Sophie Gustafson | 4 | 4–0–0 | 1–0–0 | 2–0–0 | 1–0–0 |
| Caroline Hedwall | 2.5 | 2–1–1 | 0–0–1 | 1–0–0 | 1–1–0 |
| Maria Hjorth | 1 | 1–3–0 | 0–1–0 | 1–1–0 | 0–1–0 |
| Catriona Matthew | 3 | 2–0–2 | 1–0–0 | 1–0–1 | 0–0–1 |
| Azahara Muñoz | 2.5 | 2–1–1 | 1–0–0 | 1–0–1 | 0–1–0 |
| Anna Nordqvist | 2 | 2–2–0 | 0–1–0 | 1–1–0 | 1–0–0 |
| Suzann Pettersen | 3 | 3–1–0 | 1–0–0 | 1–0–0 | 1–1–0 |
| Melissa Reid | 1 | 1–3–0 | 0–1–0 | 0–1–0 | 1–1–0 |
| Karen Stupples | 1 | 1–2–0 | 1–0–0 | 0–2–0 | 0–0–0 |

=== United States ===
| Player | Points | Overall | Singles | Foursomes | Fourballs |
|---|---|---|---|---|---|
| Paula Creamer | 3.5 | 3–1–1 | 0–1–0 | 1–0–1 | 2–0–0 |
| Vicky Hurst | 1 | 1–1–0 | 1–0–0 | 0–0–0 | 0–1–0 |
| Juli Inkster | 0.5 | 0–2–1 | 0–0–1 | 0–2–0 | 0–0–0 |
| Cristie Kerr | 2.5 | 2–2–1 | 0–1–0 | 1–0–1 | 1–1–0 |
| Christina Kim | 1.5 | 1–0–1 | 1–0–0 | 0–0–0 | 0–0–1 |
| Brittany Lang | 1 | 1–3–0 | 1–0–0 | 0–2–0 | 0–1–0 |
| Stacy Lewis | 1 | 1–3–0 | 0–1–0 | 0–2–0 | 1–0–0 |
| Brittany Lincicome | 2 | 2–2–0 | 0–1–0 | 1–0–0 | 1–1–0 |
| Ryann O'Toole | 3 | 2–0–2 | 0–0–1 | 1–0–0 | 1–0–1 |
| Morgan Pressel | 4 | 4–0–0 | 1–0–0 | 1–0–0 | 2–0–0 |
| Angela Stanford | 0 | 0–3–0 | 0–1–0 | 0–2–0 | 0–0–0 |
| Michelle Wie | 1 | 1–3–0 | 0–1–0 | 1–0–0 | 0–2–0 |
