= 2009 Ladies European Tour =

Professional golf tour

2009 Ladies European Tour season
- Duration: February 2009 – December 2009
- Number of official events: 21
- Order of Merit: (Sweden) Sophie Gustafson
- Player of the Year: (Scotland) Catriona Matthew
- Rookie of the Year: (South Korea) Anna Nordqvist
- Lowest stroke average: (Scotland) Catriona Matthew

The 2009 Ladies European Tour was a series of golf tournaments for elite female golfers from around the world which took place from February through December 2009. The tournaments were sanctioned by the Ladies European Tour (LET).

The tour featured 21 official money events, as well as the Solheim Cup and the European Ladies Golf Cup. Sophie Gustafson won the Order of Merit with earnings of €281,315, ahead of Catriona Matthew. Gustafson participated in only four events, and Matthew only three events. Anna Nordqvist won Rookie of the Year honours, after finishing 13th in the Order of Merit.

== Schedule ==
Key

Major championships
LET majors in **bold**
Regular events
Team championships

Date	Tournament	Host country	Winner	Purse (€)	Other tours (Note: ALPG − ALPG Tour, KLPGA − LPGA of Korea Tour, LAGT − Ladies Asian Golf Tour, LPGA − LPGA Tour.)	Notes
8 Feb	ANZ Ladies Masters	Australia	(Australia) Katherine Hull (n/a)	A$500,000	ALPG	
15 Feb	Women's Australian Open	Australia	(England) Laura Davies (38)	A$600,000	ALPG	
26 Apr	European Ladies Golf Cup	Spain	Netherlands (Christel Boeljon and Marjet van der Graaff)	350,000		Team event; unofficial prize money
~~10 May~~	~~Turkish Ladies Open~~	~~Turkey~~	Cancelled	~~250,000~~		
17 May	Ladies Swiss Open	Switzerland	(Norway) Marianne Skarpnord (1)	525,000		
24 May	Ladies German Open	Germany	(France) Jade Schaeffer (1)	300,000		
7 Jun	Dutch Ladies Open	Netherlands	(Spain) Tania Elósegui (1)	250,000		
14 Jun	Ladies Open of Portugal	Portugal	(Sweden) Johanna Westerberg (1)	200,000		
28 Jun	Ladies Irish Open	Ireland	(Italy) Diana Luna (2)	500,000		
4 Jul	SAS Masters	Norway	(Italy) Diana Luna (3)	200,000		
19 Jul	Open De España Femenino	Spain	(Wales) Becky Brewerton (2)	275,000		
26 Jul	**Evian Masters**	France	(Japan) Ai Miyazato (n/a)	$3,250,000	LPGA	
2 Aug	**Ricoh Women's British Open**	England	(Scotland) Catriona Matthew (3)	$2,200,000	LPGA	
9 Aug	Wales Ladies Championship of Europe	Wales	(England) Karen Stupples (2)	£300,000		
~~16 Aug~~	~~Göteborg Masters~~	~~Sweden~~	Cancelled	~~250,000~~		
23 Aug	Solheim Cup	United States	United States	–		Team event; no prize money
30 Aug	Finnair Masters	Finland	(Spain) Beatriz Recari (1)	200,000		
13 Sep	Austrian Ladies Open	Austria	(Sweden) Linda Wessberg (3)	250,000		
20 Sep	Open de France Dames	France	(Austria) Nicole Gergely (1)	300,000		
29 Sep	Tenerife Ladies Open	Spain	(England) Felicity Johnson (1)	300,000		
3 Oct	Madrid Ladies Masters	Spain	(Spain) Azahara Muñoz (1)	200,000		
17 Oct	Ladies Italian Open	Italy	(Norway) Marianne Skarpnord (2)	200,000		
1 Nov	Suzhou Taihu Ladies Open	China	(South Korea) Bo-Mi Suh (1)	200,000	LAGT	
8 Nov	Daishin Securities Tomato Tour Korean Ladies Masters	South Korea	(South Korea) Kim Ji-hyun (1)	$300,000	KLPGA	
12 Dec	Dubai Ladies Masters	United Arab Emirates	(South Korea) Kim In-Kyung (n/a)	500,000		

== Order of Merit rankings ==
Rank	Player	Country	Earnings
1	Sophie Gustafson	Sweden	€281,315.00
2	Catriona Matthew	Scotland	€259,871.29
3	Becky Brewerton	Wales	€221,496.10
4	Marianne Skarpnord	Norway	€203,350.38
5	Tania Elósegui	Spain	€193,224.09
6	Diana Luna	Italy	€185,911.21
7	Melissa Reid	England	€168,749.67
8	Laura Davies	England	€152,505.07
9	Gwladys Nocera	France	€137,730.27
10	Jade Schaeffer	France	€130,904.86

== Location of tournaments ==
Location of tournaments in Europe.
Major championship
National open
Regular event
Team event
Location of tournaments outside Europe.
National open
Regular event
Solheim Cup
