= 2002 Espirito Santo Trophy =

Tournament information
- Dates: 16–19 October
- Location: Kuala Lumpur, Malaysia; 3.106°N 101.575°E
- Courses: Saujana Golf and Country Club (Palm Course and Bunga Raya Course)
- Organized by: World Amateur Golf Council (later named International Golf Federation)
- Format: 72 holes stroke play

Statistics
- Par: Palm: 73; Bunga Raya: 73
- Length: Palm: 6,147 yards (5,621 m); Bunga Raya:5,994 yards (5,481 m)
- Field: 39 teams 117 players

Champion
- Australia; Katherine Hull, Vicky Uwland, Lindsey Wright
- 578 (−6)
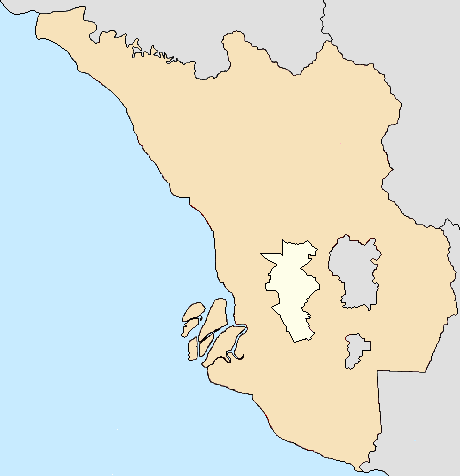
- Location in Malaysia Location in Peninsula Malaysia Location in Shah Alam

The 2002 Espirito Santo Trophy took place 16–19 October at Saujana Golf and Country Club, on its Palm Course and Bunga Raya Course, in Kuala Lumpur, Malaysia.

It was the 20th women's golf World Amateur Team Championship for the Espirito Santo Trophy.

The tournament was a 72-hole stroke play team event. There were 39 team entries, each with two or three players.

Each team played two rounds at the Palm Course and two rounds at the Bunga Raya Course in different orders, but the 21 leading teams played the fourth round at the Palm Course. The best two scores for each round counted towards the team total.

The Australia team won the Trophy for their second title, their first since 1978. Silver medalist team Thailand had the same total score as Australia, but Australia was declared the winner, since their third player, Vicky Uwland, had a lower score than Thailand's third player, Titiya Plucksataporn, in the final round, 78 against 81. Team Spain took the bronze on third place one stroke back. Defending champion France finished tied 15th.

The individual title went to Aree Song Wongluekiet, Thailand, whose score of 4-under-par, 288, was one stroke ahead of Tania Elóseguie, Spain, and Lindsey Wright, Australia.

== Teams ==
39 teams entered the event and completed the competition. Each team had three players, except the teams from Bolivia, Greece and Russia which had only two players. One player representing Croatia withdraw from the fourth round and one player representing Iran withdraw from the third and fourth round.

Country	Players
Argentina	Astrid Gulesserian, Victoria Gabenara, Maria Olivero
Australia	Katherine Hull, Vicky Uwland, Lindsey Wright
Austria	Katharina Werdinig, Nicole Gergely, Stefanie Michl
Belgium	Lien Willens, Justine Barbier, Amandine Brouwez
Bolivia	Verónica Maldonado, Andrea Maldonado
Brazil	Mariana De Biase, Patricia Carvalho, Maria Priscila Iida
Canada	Jan Dowling, Lisa Meldrum, Laura Matthews
Chile	Paz Echeverría, Gloria Soto Ferrada, Francisca Vargas
Chinese Taipei	Shih Huei-ju, Hung Chin-huei, Yu Pei-lin
Colombia	Cristina Baena, Carolina Llano, Maria Catalina Marín
Croatia	Snjezana Crnoglavac, Sanja Serfezi, Daria Zubrinic
Denmark	Mette Buus, Julie Tvede, Lisa Holm Sørensen
Finland	Kaisa Ruuttila, Jenni Kuosa, Minea Blomqvist
France	Mahault Passerat De Silans, Gwladys Nocera, Alexandra Vilatte
Germany	Denise Simon, Pia Odefey, Martina Eberl
Great Britain & Ireland	Emma Duggleby, Heather Stirling, Becky Brewerton
Greece	Irene Krambs, Evita Sideri
Guatemala	Beatríz de Arenas, María Cristina Arenas, María José Gutiérrez
Hong Kong	Betty Ng, Eva Yoe, Sarah Henderson
Iran	Zohreh Kasrai, Mina Varzi, Firozeh Mohamad Zamani
Italy	Claire Grignolo, Federica Piovano, Tullia Calzavara
Japan	Ai Miyazato, Izumi Narita, Kyoko Furuya
Malaysia	Nur Sayyedda, Valerie Tan, Nining Harris
Mexico	Alejandra Martin Del Campo, Tanya Dergal, Violeta Retamoza
Netherlands	Charlotte Heeres, Natascha Duvalois, Dewi Claire Schreefel
New Zealand	Wendy Hawkes, Tina Howard, Brenda Ormsby
Norway	Camilla Guriby Hilland, Lill Kristin Saether, Marianne Skarpnord
Philippines	Heidi Chua, Aileen Rose Yao, Carmelette Villaroman
Portugal	Carolina Catanho, Carla Cruz, Lara Vieira
Puerto Rico	Karen Calvesbert, María del Mar Colón, Laura Díaz
Russia	Daria Anisimova, Maria Kostina
Slovakia	Andrea Lupsinová, Veronika Falathová, Zuzana Kamasová
South Africa	Lee-Anne Pace, Tanica Van As, Gilly Tebbutt
South Korea	Kim Joo-mi, Park Won-mi, Yim Sung-ah
Spain	Nuria Clau, Tania Elósegui, Marta Prieto
Sweden	Helena Svensson, Karin Sjödin, Mikaela Parmlid
Switzerland	Nora Angehrn, Sheila Gut-Lee, Natalia Tanno
Thailand	Titiya Plucksataporn, Aree Song Wongluekiet, Naree Song Wongluekiet
United States	Emily Bastel, Becky Lucidi, Laura Myerscough

== Results ==
Place	Country	Score	To par
1	Australia *	152-140-141-145=578	−6
2	Thailand	139-145-146-148=578	−6
3	Spain	144-144-143-148=579	−5
4	Germany	147-140-146-148=581	−4
5	United States	143-150-142-149=584	E
T6	Japan	147-145-150-145=587	+3
T6	South Korea	144-152-145-146=587	+3
T8	Great Britain & Ireland	156-147-141-144=588	+4
T8	Italy	148-142-150-148=588	+4
T8	Sweden	146-150-144-148=588	+4
11	Finland	144-148-144-153=589	+5
T12	Canada	150-148-147-148=593	+9
T12	Colombia	149-149-146-149=593	+9
14	Chinese Taipei	150-149-148-147=594	+10
T15	Denmark	147-150-151-149=597	+13
T15	France	147-152-148-150=597	+13
17	Mexico	151-146-144-157=598	+14
18	Norway	150-150-144-156=600	+16
19	Netherlands	149-152-148-152=601	+17
20	New Zealand	150-149-146-158=603	+19
21	Austria	153-152-153-153=611	+27
22	Brazil	156-161-148-150=615	+31
T23	Argentina	153-157-157-149=616	+32
T23	Philippines	158-152-155-151=616	+32
25	Switzerland	148-158-157-157=620	+36
26	Chile	162-164-148-153=627	+43
27	Belgium	162-151-162-154=629	+45
28	Hong Kong	157-157-155-162=631	+47
T29	Malaysia	161-157-162-155=635	+51
T29	South Africa	167-155-158-155=635	+51
31	Portugal	154-167-157-160=638	+54
32	Guatemala	159-166-170-157=652	+68
33	Russia	172-161-167-161=661	+77
34	Slovakia	172-165-160-166=663	+79
35	Puerto Rico	171-169-166-168=674	+90
36	Bolivia	180-176-170-164=690	+106
37	Greece	173-181-182-173=709	+126
38	Croatia	183-190-184-181=738	+154
39	Iran	236-229-236-224=925	+341

* Australia was awarded the tiebreak, since their third player, Vicky Uwland, had a lower score than Thailand's third player, Titiya Plucksataporn, in the final round, 78 against 81.

== Individual leaders ==
There was no official recognition for the lowest individual scores.

Place	Player	Country	Score	To par
1	Aree Song Wongluekiet	Thailand	71-71-74-72=288	−4
T2	Tania Elóseguie	Spain	72-74-70-73=289	−3
T2	Lindsey Wright	Australia	77-70-70-72=289	−3
4	Katherine Hull	Australia	75-70-72-73=290	−2
T5	Tullia Calzavara	Italy	70-71-76-74=291	−1
T5	Naree Song Wongluekiet	Thailand	68-75-72-76=291	−1
T7	Martina Eberl	Germany	72-72-72-76=292	E
T7	Laura Matthews	Canada	73-72-73-74=292	E
T9	Minea Blomqvist	Finland	72-74-70-77=293	+1
T9	Lisa Holm Sørensen	Denmark	72-75-73-72=293	+1
T9	Yu Pei Lin	Chinese Taipei	75-75-73-70=293	+1
T9	Denise Simon	Germany	77-68-76-72=293	+1
