= Christina Kim =

American professional golfer (born 1984)

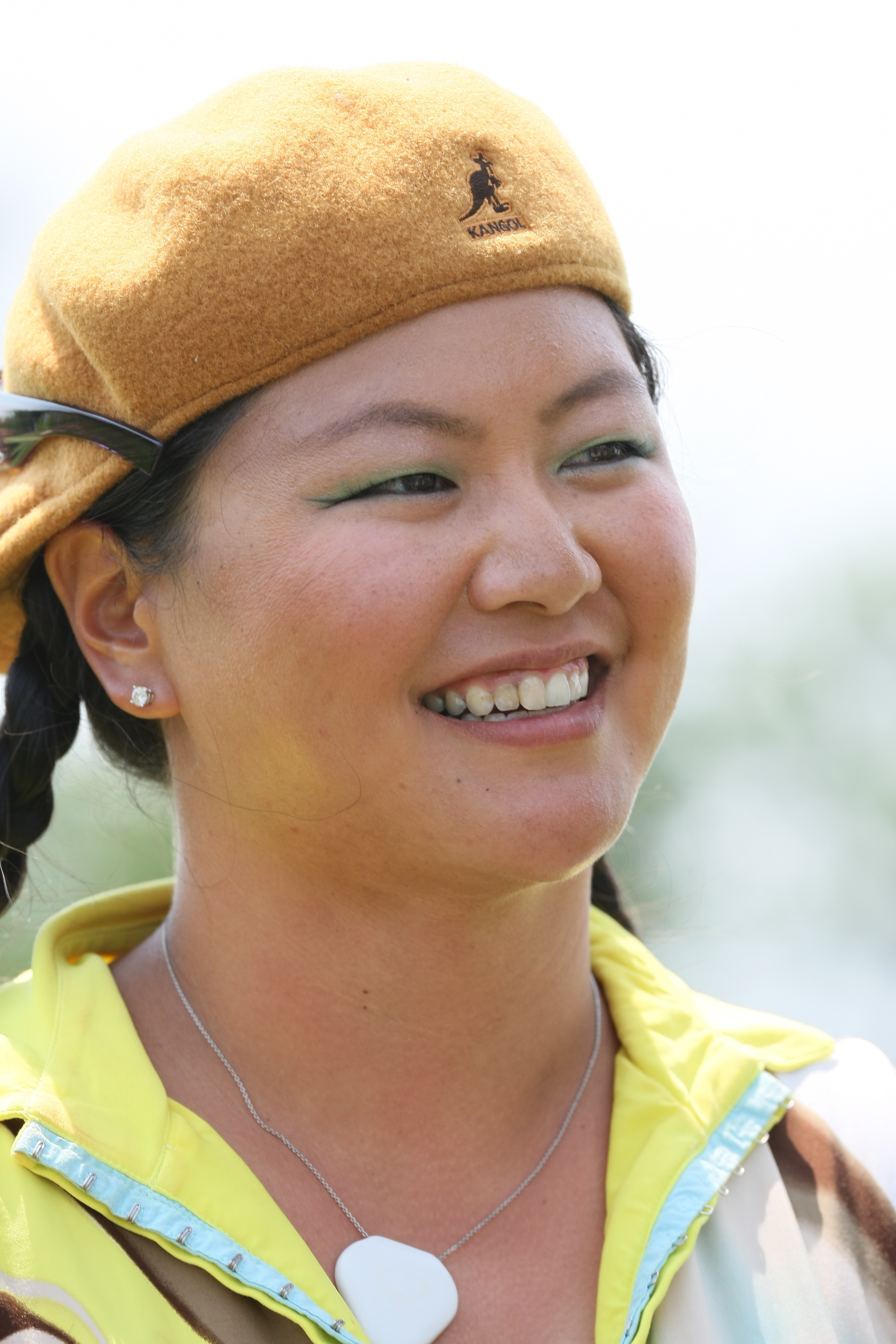
- Kim at the 2009 LPGA Championship

Personal information
- Nicknames: Kookie, CK, The CK
- Nationality: United States
- Born: March 15, 1984 (age 42) San Jose, California, U.S.
- Height: 5 ft 6 in (1.68 m)

Career
- Sport: Golf
- College: De Anza Community College
- Turned professional: 2002
- Current tours: LPGA Tour (joined 2003); Ladies European Tour (joined 2010)
- Former tour: Futures Tour (joined 2002)
- Professional wins: 5

Number of wins by tour
- LPGA Tour: 3
- Ladies European Tour: 1
- Epson Tour: 1

Best results in LPGA major championships
- Chevron Championship: 7th: 2009
- Women's PGA C'ship: T6: 2004
- U.S. Women's Open: T8: 2010
- Women's British Open: T3: 2009
- Evian Championship: T31: 2013

- Christina Kim
- Hangul: 김초롱
- Hanja: 金楚籠
- RR: Gim Chorong
- MR: Kim Ch'orong

Christina Kim (born March 15, 1984) is an American professional golfer currently playing on the LPGA Tour and on the Ladies European Tour (LET). She is known for her animated style of play, flamboyant dress, and outgoing personality.

Kim competed in eight events in 2001 on the Futures Tour and made three cuts and a tied for second once. Shortly after her 18th birthday, Kim turned professional and competed on the 2002 Futures Tour for prize money. Kim missed just one cut in 18 starts with 12 top-ten finishes. She won her first event as a professional in August 2002 - the Hewlett-Packard Garden State Futures Summer Classic in a six-hole playoff over future LPGA Tour star Lorena Ochoa. Kim was second to Ochoa on the money list and both earned LPGA Tour cards for 2003.

Kim won the 2004 Longs Drugs Challenge and the 2005 Mitchell Company Tournament of Champions and was a member of three U.S. Solheim Cup teams in 2005, 2009, and 2011. She was the youngest player to reach $1 million in earnings, which she achieved in 2004 at age 20. This record was broken the following year by Paula Creamer.

She joined the Ladies European Tour in 2010 and competed in six events, including two that were co-sanctioned with the LPGA. She earned her first win on the LET in 2011 at the Sicilian Italian Ladies Open.

Kim's autobiography, Swinging from My Heels: Confessions of an LPGA Star, co-written with Alan Shipnuck was published in 2010.

== Professional wins (5) ==
=== LPGA Tour wins (3) ===
No.	Date	Tournament	Winning score	To par	Margin of victory	Runner-up
1	Sep 26, 2004	Longs Drugs Challenge	64-69-68-65=266	−18	1 stroke	(Australia) Karrie Webb
2	Nov 13, 2005	The Mitchell Company Tournament of Champions	67-67-72-67=273	−15	1 stroke	(Australia) Rachel Hetherington
3	Nov 16, 2014	Lorena Ochoa Invitational	65-69-68-71=273	−15	Playoff	(China) Shanshan Feng

LPGA Tour playoff record (1–1)

No.	Year	Tournament	Opponent(s)	Result
1	2010	Jamie Farr Owens Corning Classic	(South Korea) Na Yeon Choi (South Korea) In-Kyung Kim (South Korea) Song-Hee Kim	Choi won with birdie on second extra hole
2	2014	Lorena Ochoa Invitational	(China) Shanshan Feng	Won with par on second extra hole

=== Ladies European Tour wins (1) ===
No.	Date	Tournament	Winning score	Margin of victory	Runner-up
1	Oct 9, 2011	Sicilian Ladies Italian Open	−7 (70-69-70=209)	4 strokes	(Italy) Giulia Sergas

=== Futures Tour wins(1) ===
No.	Date	Tournament	Winning score	To par	Margin of victory	Runner-up
1	Aug 4, 2002	Hewlett-Packard Garden State Futures Summer Classic	66-67-66=199	−14	Playoff	(Mexico) Lorena Ochoa

Futures Tour playoff record (1–0)

No.	Year	Tournament	Opponent(s)	Result
1	2002	Hewlett-Packard Garden State Futures Summer Classic	(Mexico) Lorena Ochoa	Won with birdie on sixth extra hole

== Results in LPGA majors ==
Results not in chronological order.

Tournament	2001	2002	2003	2004	2005	2006	2007	2008	2009
Chevron Championship			T28	T8	T39	52	T24	CUT	7
Women's PGA Championship			CUT	T6	T33	T61	T56	CUT	CUT
U.S. Women's Open	T48		T22	T37	CUT	CUT	CUT	T53	T52
Women's British Open			CUT	T13	T28	T45	T58	T64	T3

Tournament	2010	2011	2012	2013	2014	2015	2016	2017	2018	2019
Chevron Championship	CUT	CUT	T75		T16	T11	CUT	T42		
Women's PGA Championship	T25	CUT	CUT	CUT	CUT	CUT	T39	CUT	CUT	CUT
U.S. Women's Open	T8	CUT	CUT	T31		CUT	T26	T27		
The Evian Championship ^				T31	T54	T64	CUT	CUT	T67	
Women's British Open	T9	CUT		CUT	T54	T31	T50			

Tournament	2020	2021	2022	2023
Chevron Championship	T24	T19	CUT	CUT
Women's PGA Championship	CUT	T67	CUT	CUT
U.S. Women's Open	CUT	CUT		
The Evian Championship ^	NT	T38		
Women's British Open	CUT	CUT		

^ The Evian Championship was added as a major in 2013

Top 10
Did not play

CUT = missed the half-way cut
NT = no tournament
T = tied

=== Summary ===
Tournament	Wins	2nd	3rd	Top-5	Top-10	Top-25	Events	Cuts made
Chevron Championship	0	0	0	0	2	7	18	12
Women's PGA Championship	0	0	0	0	1	2	21	7
U.S. Women's Open	0	0	0	0	1	2	17	9
The Evian Championship	0	0	0	0	0	0	7	5
Women's British Open	0	0	1	1	2	3	15	10
Totals	0	0	1	1	6	14	78	43

- Most consecutive cuts made – 6 (2004 Kraft Nabisco – 2005 LPGA)
- Longest streak of top-10s – 2 (twice)

== LPGA Tour career summary ==
Year	Tournaments played	Cuts made*	Wins	2nd	3rd	Top 10s	Best finish	Earnings ($)	Money list rank	Scoring average	Scoring rank
2001	1	1	0	0	0	0	T48	n/a		74.00	
2003	28	18	0	0	0	2	T4	215,632	49	72.37	55
2004	31	25	1	1	0	6	1	636,290	15	71.22	19
2005	30	27	1	0	1	6	1	621,149	19	71.66	21
2006	29	26	0	0	0	3	T5	355,656	35	72.24	52
2007	29	26	0	2	0	7	2	626,075	23	72.18	26
2008	30	26	0	1	0	9	T2	678,598	27	71.85	32
2009	24	17	0	0	1	4	T3	344,055	38	72.29	49
2010	24	19	0	1	0	2	T2	436,050	26	72.17	38
2011	21	14	0	0	0	0	T13	149,275	58	72.86	56
2012	19	8	0	0	0	0	T49	38,384	110	74.02	111
2013	20	13	0	0	0	0	T11	126,535	76	73.07	100
2014	27	22	1	1	0	3	1	570,374	27	71.62	38
2015	29	24	0	0	0	1	T8	234,153	69	72.01	57
2016	27	20	0	1	0	3	2	411,030	45	72.51	89
2017	25	16	0	0	0	0	T13	151,669	87	72.33	114
2018	21	13	0	0	0	0	T17	121,430	94	71.86	70
2019	20	7	0	0	0	0	T19	79,209	117	72.43	120
2020	15	11	0	0	0	3	T9	167,125	67	71.82	54
2021	20	10	0	0	0	0	T16	151,514	91	71.84	88
2022	19	5	0	0	0	0	T35	27,653	166	73.00	147
2023	13	7	0	0	0	0	T31	45,576	159	72.71	135
2024	5	1	0	0	0	0	T77	3,145	194	72.33	n/a
2025	4	0	0	0	0	0	CUT	0	n/a	75.25	n/a
Total^	511	356	3	7	2	49	1	6,190,831	70		

^ Official as of 2025 season
* Includes matchplay and other events without a cut.

== LET career summary ==
Year	Tournaments played	Cuts made	Wins	2nd	3rd	Top 10s	Best finish	Earnings (€)	Order of Merit
2010	6	4	0	1	0	3	T2	108,461	16
2011	10	8	1	0	0	1	1	63,412	35

- Includes events co-sanctioned with the LPGA Tour (Evian Masters and Women's British Open)

== Futures Tour summary ==
Year	Tournaments played	Cuts made	Wins	2nd	3rd	Top 10s	Best finish	Earnings ($)	Money list rank	Scoring average	Scoring rank
2001	8	3	0	1		3	T2	n/a		72.09	
2002	18	17	1	3	2	12	1	53,460	2	71.47	2

== Team appearances ==
Professional

- Solheim Cup (representing the United States): 2005 (winners), 2009 (winners), 2011
- Lexus Cup (representing International team): 2008 (winners)

=== Solheim Cup record ===
Year	Total matches	Total W-L-H	Singles W-L-H	Foursomes W-L-H	Fourballs W-L-H	Points won	Points %
Career	10	6-2-2	3-0-0	2-1-1	1-1-1	7.0	70.0
2005	4	2-1-1	1-0-0 def L. Kreutz 5&4	1-0-1 halved w/ P. Hurst, won w/ N. Gulbis 4&2	0-1-0 lost w/ P. Hurst 4&2	2.5	62.5
2009	4	3-1-0	1-0-0 def T. Elósegui 2 up	1-1-0 won w/ N. Gulbis 4&2, lost w/N. Gulbis 5&4	1-0-0 won w/ M. Wie 5&4	3	75.0
2011	2	1-0-1	1-0-0 def M. Hjorth 4&2	0-0-0	0-0-1 halved w/ R. O'Toole	1.5	75.0
