= Denise Simon =

German professional golfer

Personal information
- Nationality: Germany
- Born: 2 November 1983 (age 42) Heidelberg, Germany

Career
- Sport: Golf
- Turned professional: 2004
- Former tour: Ladies European Tour (joined 2005)

Denise Simon (born 2 November 1983) is a German professional golfer. She won the Junior Ryder Cup in 1999 and 2002, the European Girls' Team Championship in 1999, and played on the Ladies European Tour (LET) between 2005 and 2008.

== Amateur career ==
Simon represented Golf Club St. Leon-Rot and boasts a prolific amateur record, winning the Austrian, Swiss, Portuguese and German Amateur Championships. She was also runner-up at the 2003 Spanish International Ladies Amateur Championship and third in the British Ladies Amateur and French Amateur Championships.

Representing her National Team, Simon won the 1999 European Girls' Team Championship in Finland and was runner-up at the 2002 European Lady Junior's Team Championship in Moscow, Russia.

Simon finished 4th representing Germany at the 2002 Espirito Santo Trophy with Pia Odefey and Martina Eberl, and 9th at the 2004 Espirito Santo Trophy with Pia Odefey and Sandra Gal.

She won the Junior Ryder Cup as part of the European squad in 1999 and 2002 and the Vagliano Trophy in 2001.

== Professional career ==
Simon turned professional after securing her LET card by finishing T15 at Q-School in November 2004.

Together with Anja Monke Simon represented Germany at the Women's World Cup of Golf in South Africa in January 2007, replacing Miriam Nagl who had to pull out of the tournament following a holiday skiing accident.

Her best LET finish is a tie for 15th, reached both at the Ladies French Open and the Wales Ladies Championship of Europe, in 2006. She retired from tour in 2008.

== Team appearances ==
Amateur

- Junior Ryder Cup (representing Europe): 1999 (winners), 2002 (winners)
- European Girls' Team Championship (representing Germany): 1999 (winners), 2000
- European Lady Junior's Team Championship (representing Germany): 2002
- European Ladies' Team Championship (representing Germany): 2003
- Vagliano Trophy (representing the Continent of Europe): 2001 (winners)
- Espirito Santo Trophy (representing Germany): 2002, 2004

Professional

- Women's World Cup of Golf (representing Germany): 2007
