= Lindsey Wright =

Australian professional golfer (born 1979)

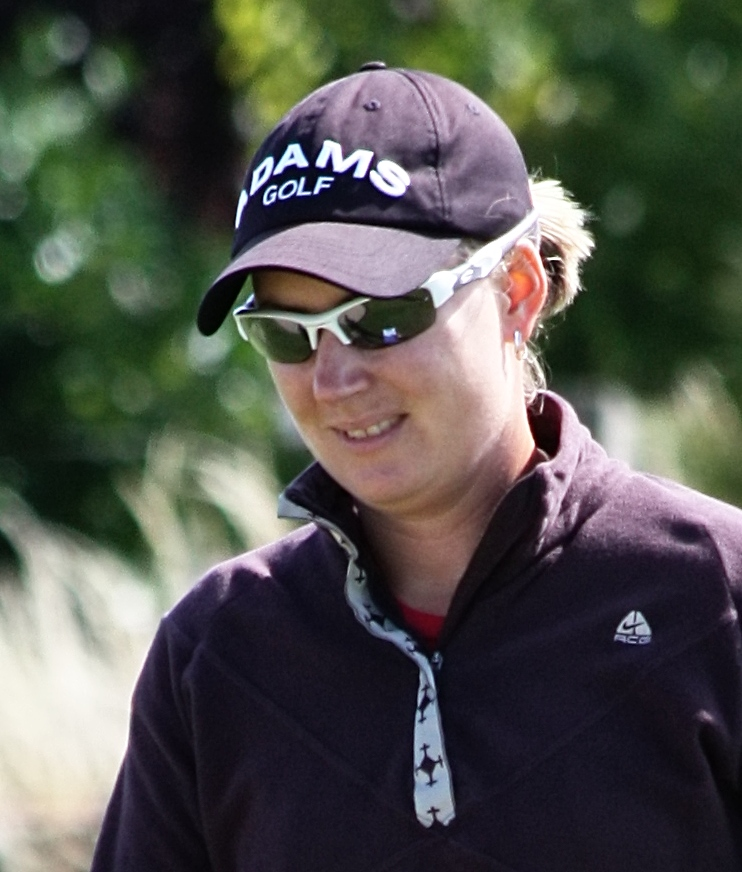
- Wright before 2009 Women's British Open

Personal information
- Full name: Lindsey Elizabeth Wright
- Nationality: Australia
- Born: 31 December 1979 (age 46) Tunbridge Wells, England
- Height: 5 ft 6 in (1.68 m)

Career
- Sport: Golf
- College: Pepperdine University
- Turned professional: 2003
- Former tours: LPGA Tour (joined 2004); ALPG Tour; Futures Tour
- Professional wins: 5

Number of wins by tour
- Ladies European Tour: 1
- WPGA Tour of Australasia: 2
- Epson Tour: 3

Best results in LPGA major championships
- Chevron Championship: 4th: 2009
- Women's PGA C'ship: 2nd: 2009
- U.S. Women's Open: T17: 2009
- Women's British Open: T17: 2012
- Evian Championship: T52: 2013

Lindsey Elizabeth Wright (born 31 December 1979) is an Australian professional golfer playing on the LPGA Tour. She earned exempt status for the 2004 LPGA season in 2003, and has been competing full-time on the Tour since.

== Early life and amateur career ==
Wright was born in Tunbridge Wells, Kent, England in 1979. She took up golf at the age of nine. She was an Australian Institute of Sport golf scholarship holder from 1998 to 1999. In 1998, she was the leading amateur at the Women's Australian Open.

For university, she attended Pepperdine University. She finished second at the 2001 NCAA Championship while at Pepperdine. She was a semifinalist at the 2002 U.S. Women's Amateur, finished second at the 2002 World Cup in Malaysia, and was a finalist at the 2002 British Ladies Amateur. She played in the 2003 Kraft Nabisco Championship as an amateur and tied for 57th.

== Professional career ==
In 2003, Wright turned professional in June and competed on the Futures Tour, where she won the GE FUTURES Professional Golf Classic. She tied for 54th at the LPGA Final Qualifying Tournament to earn non-exempt status for the 2004 LPGA season. In 2004, she competed on the Futures Tour, where she won the Bank of Ann Arbor FUTURES Golf Classic and finished second on the money list to earn exempt status for the 2005 LPGA season. In 2005, she recorded a season-best tie for fifth at the Longs Drugs Challenge. In 2006, she recorded a season-best tie for sixth at the CN Canadian Women's Open and carded a career-low 66 during the second round of the Fields Open in Hawaii, where she tied for ninth.

Wright recorded a career-best finish at the McDonald's LPGA Championship, where she finished fourth and tied her career-low 66 in the final round. She also tied for fifth at the Wegmans LPGA and at the HSBC Women's World Match Play Championship.

== Personal life ==
Wright currently holds residence in both McKinney, Texas and Albury, Australia. Lindsay, who is also a qualified registered nurse, has been working as a full-time nurse after the prime of her career since 2018.

== Awards and honor ==
She was a four-time All-American while at Pepperdine University.

== Professional wins (5) ==
=== Futures Tour wins (3) ===
No.	Date	Tournament	Winning score	To par	Margin of victory	Runner(s)-up	Winner's share ($)
1	20 Jul 2003	GE FUTURES Professional Golf Classic	74-72-70-69=205	−8	Playoff	(United States) Michelle Fuller (England) Lisa Hall	8,400
2	9 May 2004	Isleta Casino & Resort FUTURES Gold Classic	68–69–66=203	−13	2 strokes	(South Korea) Aram Cho	10,500
3	6 Jun 2004	Bank of Ann Arbor FUTURES Golf Classic	69–67–72=208	–13	1 stroke	(United States) Kathryn Cusick (South Korea) Jimin Kang	8,400

LPGA Tour playoff record (0–1)

No.	Year	Tournament	Opponent	Result
1	2009	Jamie Farr Owens Corning Classic	(South Korea) Eunjung Yi	Lost to birdie on first extra hole

=== ALPG Tour wins (2) ===
- 2004 Catalina Country Club Pro-Am
- 2012 ISPS Handa New Zealand Women's Open (co-sanctioned with Ladies European Tour)

== Results in LPGA majors ==
Results not in chronological order before 2014.

Tournament	2003	2004	2005	2006	2007	2008	2009	2010	2011	2012	2013	2014
Kraft Nabisco Championship	T57			CUT	T26	T42	4	CUT	T52	T43	73	CUT
U.S. Women's Open			CUT	T37		T42	T17	T48	T50		CUT	
Women's British Open			CUT	T31	CUT	CUT	CUT	CUT	CUT	T17	T59	
LPGA Championship			T16	T20	4	T18	2	T14	CUT		CUT	CUT
The Evian Championship ^											T52	CUT

^ The Evian Championship was added as a major in 2013.

Top 10
Did not play

CUT = missed the half-way cut
"T" = tied

=== Summary ===
Tournament	Wins	2nd	3rd	Top-5	Top-10	Top-25	Events	Cuts made
Kraft Nabisco Championship	0	0	0	1	1	1	10	7
U.S. Women's Open	0	0	0	0	0	1	7	5
Women's British Open	0	0	0	0	0	1	9	3
LPGA Championship	0	1	0	2	2	6	10	6
The Evian Championship	0	0	0	0	0	0	2	1
Totals	0	1	0	3	3	9	38	22

- Most consecutive cuts made – 5 (2006 LPGA – 2007 LPGA)
- Longest streak of top-10s – 2 (2009 Kraft Nabisco – 2008 LPGA)

== Team appearances ==
Amateur

- Espirito Santo Trophy (representing Australia): 2000, 2002 (winners)
- Commonwealth Trophy (representing Australia): 1999 (winners)
- Tasman Cup (representing Australia): 1999 (winners)

Professional

- World Cup (representing Australia): 2007, 2008
- International Crown (representing Australia): 2014
- The Queens (representing Australia): 2015
