= Tania Elósegui =

Spanish professional golfer (born 1981)

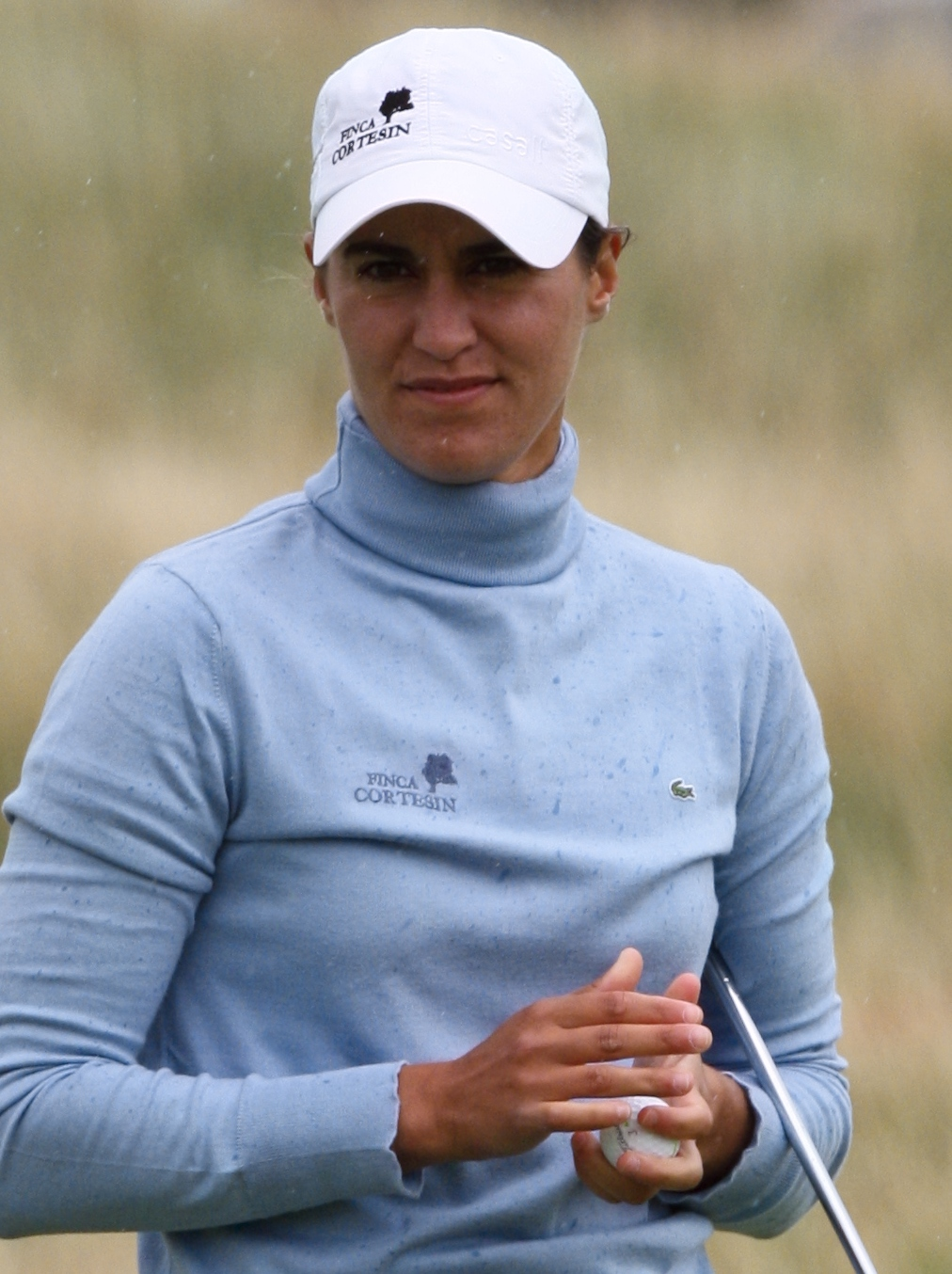
- Tania Elósegui

Personal information
- Full name: Tania Elósegui Mayor
- Nationality: Spain
- Born: 13 December 1981 (age 44) San Sebastián, Spain

Career
- Sport: Golf
- College: University of the Basque Country
- Turned professional: 2005
- Current tours: Ladies European Tour (joined in 2005); LPGA Tour (joined 2009)
- Professional wins: 1

Number of wins by tour
- Ladies European Tour: 1

Best results in LPGA major championships
- Chevron Championship: CUT: 2010
- Women's PGA C'ship: CUT: 2010
- U.S. Women's Open: CUT: 2010
- Women's British Open: T69: 2008
- Evian Championship: DNP
Medal record
Mediterranean Games
| Gold medal – first place | 2001 Tunis | Women's team |
| Bronze medal – third place | 2001 Tunis | Individual |

Tania Elósegui Mayor (born 13 December 1981) is a professional golfer from Spain.

== Early life and amateur career ==
Elósegui was born in San Sebastian, Spain. She started playing golf at the age of 9 and had a successful amateur career before turning professional.

As an amateur, Elósegui would win a bronze medal at the 2002 World Amateur Championship in Malaysia. She would also win two gold medals in the European Team Championships and two in junior silver medal junior championships. She turned professional in 2005.

== Professional career ==
In 2005, she joined the Ladies European Tour. Elósegui would not find much success until 2009. She collected one victory at the ABN AMRO Ladies Open and would finish in the top 10 in every event she played in, with her worst finish being 10th. With her consistent 2009 play, Elósegui earned a spot on the 2009 Solheim Cup European Team.

== Professional wins (1) ==
=== Ladies European Tour (1) ===
| No. | Date | Tournament | Winning score | To par | Margin of victory | Runner-up | Winner's share (€) |
|---|---|---|---|---|---|---|---|
| 1 | 7 Jun 2009 | ABN AMRO Ladies Open | 70-68-69=207 | −9 | 1 stroke | (Italy) Diana Luna | 37,500 |

== Team appearances ==
Amateur

- European Ladies' Team Championship (representing Spain): 1999, 2001, 2003 (winners), 2005 (winners)
- Espirito Santo Trophy (representing Spain): 2000, 2002
- European Lady Junior's Team Championship (representing Spain): 2002 (winners), 2004 (winners)

Professional

- Solheim Cup (representing Europe): 2009
- World Cup (representing Spain): 2007, 2008

=== Solheim Cup record ===
| Year | Total matches | Total W-L-H | Singles W-L-H | Foursomes W-L-H | Fourballs W-L-H | Points won | Points % |
|---|---|---|---|---|---|---|---|
| Career | 3 | 1-2-0 | 0-1-0 | 0-0-0 | 1-1-0 | 1 | 33.33% |
| 2009 | 3 | 1-2-0 | 0-1-0 lost to C. Kim 2 up | 0-0-0 | 1-1-0 won w/H. Alfredsson 1 up, lost w/H. Alfredsson 5&4 | 1 | 33.33% |
