= 2008 Lexus Cup =

- Dates: 28–30 November 2008
- Venue: The Singapore Island Country Club
- Location: Singapore
- Captains: Se Ri Pak (Asia); Annika Sörenstam (International)
Asia	11½	12½	International
- International team wins the Lexus Cup

The 2008 Lexus Cup was a professional women's golf event contested by two teams of 12 members each: one representing Asian countries and the other representing the rest of the world, known as the "International" team. Since the event's inception in 2005, it has been sanctioned by the world's dominant women's professional golf tour, the LPGA Tour in the U.S., although it is an unofficial event in which no earnings by the competitors affect their positions on the LPGA money list.

The competition took place on the Bukit Course at The Singapore Island Country Club in Singapore from 28 to 30 November 2008. Lexus was the title sponsor; Rolex, DBS, Singapore Airlines, Callaway Golf, and Singapore Sports Council were main sponsors.

This was the last official LPGA appearance for Team International captain Annika Sörenstam, who had previously announced her retirement at the end of the 2008 season.

== Teams ==
As in the similar team events of the Solheim Cup (USA vs. Europe women), Ryder Cup (USA vs. Europe men), and Presidents Cup, each team is made up of twelve players. Four players for Team Asia and four for Team International earn sports through the Rolex Rankings. Four additional players for each team qualified through their position on the LPGA Official Money List, as of 2 November 2008. Once the top eight players for each team were confirmed, four additional players—two captain's picks and two sponsor's exemptions—were selected for each team.

Asia

- Rolex World Ranking Qualification
  - (Taiwan) Yani Tseng
  - (South Korea) Seon Hwa Lee
  - (South Korea) Jeong Jang
  - (South Korea) Eun-Hee Ji
- ADT Official Money List Qualification
  - (South Korea) Inbee Park
  - (South Korea) Na Yeon Choi
  - (South Korea) Song-Hee Kim
  - (Taiwan) Candie Kung
- Captain's Picks
  - (South Korea) Sarah Lee
  - (Japan) Mayumi Shimomura
- Sponsor's Picks
  - (Japan) Namika Omata
  - (South Korea) Se Ri Pak (playing captain)

International

- Rolex World Rankings Qualifications
  - (Sweden) Annika Sörenstam (playing captain)
  - (Norway) Suzann Pettersen
  - (United States) Paula Creamer
  - (United States) Cristie Kerr
- ADT Official Money List Qualification
  - (Sweden) Helen Alfredsson
  - (United States) Angela Stanford
  - (Australia) Katherine Hull
  - (England) Karen Stupples
- Captain's Picks
  - (United States) Nicole Castrale
  - (United States) Natalie Gulbis
- Sponsor's Picks
  - (Australia) Nikki Campbell
  - (United States) Christina Kim

== Day one ==
28 November 2008

Day one saw six foursome matches with each team putting two golfers on the course for each match and the pairs playing alternate shots. The teams split the matches with each team winning three. Only one of the six matches — Paula Creamer and Nicole Castrale vs. Se Ri Pak and Eun-Hee Ji — went to 18 holes.

Team Asia	Results	Team International
Song-Hee Kim / Inbee Park	Asia 3&2	Helen Alfredsson / Christina Kim
Sarah Lee / Na Yeon Choi	Int'l 2&1	Cristie Kerr / Karen Stupples
Yani Tseng / Seon Hwa Lee	Asia 2&1	Suzann Pettersen / Natalie Gulbis
Se Ri Pak / Eun-Hee Ji	Int'l 1 up	Paula Creamer / Nicole Castrale
Jeong Jang / Candie Kung	Asia 3&2	Angela Stanford / Annika Sörenstam
Namika Omata / Mayumi Shimomura	Int'l 3&1	Katherine Hull / Nikki Campbell
3	Foursomes	3
3	Overall	3

== Day two ==
29 November 2008

The teams remained locked in tie after the day two fourball matches where each side won three matches. All of the wins by the International Team went to 18 holes, compared to only one of the wins by Team Asia.

Team Asia	Results	Team International
Eun-Hee Ji/ Inbee Park	Int'l 1 up	Annika Sörenstam / Suzann Pettersen
Se Ri Pak / Seon Hwa Lee	Int'l 1 up	Cristie Kerr / Helen Alfredsson
Jeong Jang / Na Yeon Choi	Asia 1 up	Paula Creamer / Nicole Castrale
Sarah Lee / Song-Hee Kim	Asia 4&2	Karen Stupples / Christina Kim
Candie Kung / Mayumi Shimomura	Asia 4&3	Natalie Gulbis / Angela Stanford
Yani Tseng / Namika Omata	Int'l 1 up	Katherine Hull / Nikki Campbell
3	Fourball	3
6	Overall	6

== Day three ==
30 November 2008

Team Asia	Results	Team International
Se Ri Pak	Int'l 3&2	Annika Sörenstam
Sarah Lee	Asia 1 up	Nicole Castrale
Yani Tseng	Halved	Suzann Pettersen
Inbee Park	Int'l 3&2	Helen Alfredsson
Na Yeon Choi	Asia 3&2	Paula Creamer
Song-Hee Kim	Asia 1 up	Cristie Kerr
Eun-Hee Ji	Halved	Karen Stupples
Jeong Jang	Int'l 1 up	Katherine Hull
Mayumi Shimomura	Int'l 2&1	Natalie Gulbis
Namika Omata	Halved	Christina Kim
Candie Kung	Asia 3&2	Nikki Campbell
Seon Hwa Lee	Int'l 4&3	Angela Stanford
5 1/2	Singles	6 1/2
11 1/2	Overall	12 1/2
