= Nicole Castrale =

American professional golfer (born 1979)

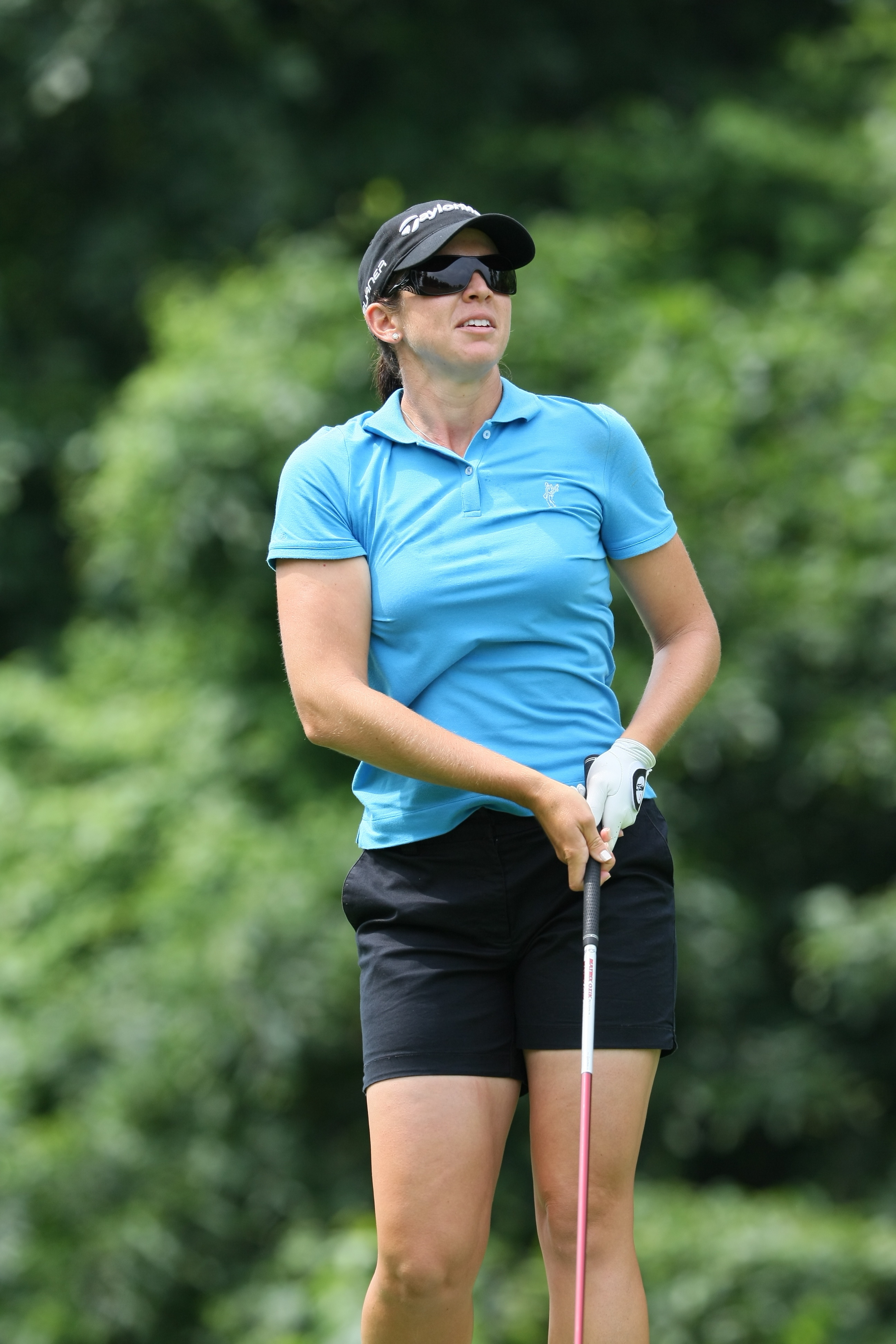
- Castrale at 2009 LPGA Championship

Personal information
- Full name: Nicole Dalkas Castrale
- Nationality: United States
- Born: March 24, 1979 (age 47) Glendale, California, U.S.
- Height: 5 ft 8 in (1.73 m)
- Spouse: Craig Castrale (m. 2005)
- Children: 1

Career
- Sport: Golf
- College: University of Southern California (2001)
- Turned professional: 2001
- Former tours: LPGA Tour (2002–2015); Futures Tour (2001, 2004, 2005)
- Professional wins: 3

Number of wins by tour
- LPGA Tour: 1
- Epson Tour: 2

Best results in LPGA major championships
- Chevron Championship: T25: 2009
- Women's PGA C'ship: T5: 2009
- U.S. Women's Open: T6: 2008
- du Maurier Classic: DNP
- Women's British Open: T9: 2013
- Evian Championship: DNP

Nicole Castrale (pronounced "cass-TRAHL-ee", née Dalkas, born March 24, 1979) is an American professional golfer who played on the LPGA Tour.

== Early life and amateur career ==
In 1979, Castrale was born in Glendale, California. She started playing golf at the age of 10. She graduated from Palm Desert High School in 1997.

She played college golf for the USC Trojans in Los Angeles and earned her bachelor's degree in 2001.

== Professional career ==
Castrale won once on the LPGA Tour, the 2007 Ginn Tribute Hosted by Annika. She also played on the Futures Tour, winning twice in consecutive weeks in 2005.

Castrale played on the U.S. Solheim Cup teams in 2007 and 2009. She made the clinching putt for the U.S. to defeat Europe in the 2007 matches in Halmstad, Sweden. She also played on the International team in the 2007 and 2008 Lexus Cups.

Castrale did not compete past June in both 2010 and 2011. She underwent surgery on her left shoulder in early July 2010 and rehabilitated the rest of the season.

== Personal life ==
Castrale married Craig Castrale on January 8, 2005. Castrale played a limited schedule in 2011 due to pregnancy and her last competitive round was on June 10. She gave birth to the couple's first child in November and returned to the LPGA Tour in March 2012.

She divorced Castrale divorced in 2015.

== Professional wins (3) ==
=== LPGA Tour wins (1) ===
No.	Date	Tournament	Winning score	To par	Margin of victory	Runner-up	Winner's share ($)
1	Jun 3, 2007	Ginn Tribute Hosted by Annika	69-71-68-71=279	–9	Playoff	(Mexico) Lorena Ochoa	390,000

LPGA Tour playoff record (1–0)

No.	Year	Tournament	Opponent(s)	Result
1	2007	Ginn Tribute Hosted by Annika	(Mexico) Lorena Ochoa	Won with par on first extra hole

=== Futures Tour wins (2) ===
No.	Date	Tournament	Winning score	To par	Margin of victory	Runner-up	Winner's share ($)
1	May 28, 2005	Northwest Indiana FUTURES Golf Classic	71-66-72=209	–7	Playoff	(South Korea) Hye Jung Choi	9,800
2	Jun 5, 2005	Kankakee FUTURES Golf Classic	66-72-71=209	–7	4 strokes	(Canada) Alena Sharp	9,800

== Results in LPGA majors ==
Results not in chronological order before 2014.

Tournament	1998	1999	2000
Kraft Nabisco Championship			
LPGA Championship			
U.S. Women's Open	CUT		
du Maurier Classic			

Tournament	2001	2002	2003	2004	2005	2006	2007	2008	2009
Kraft Nabisco Championship							T26	CUT	T25
LPGA Championship						T34	T10	T10	T5
U.S. Women's Open					CUT	T57	T35	T6	T17
Women's British Open						T31	67	T21	CUT

Tournament	2010	2011	2012	2013	2014
Kraft Nabisco Championship	CUT	T66	T79	CUT	T51
U.S. Women's Open			T9	CUT	CUT
Women's British Open			CUT	T9	
LPGA Championship	CUT		T19	T53	
The Evian Championship ^					

^ The Evian Championship was added as a major in 2013.

Top 10
Did not play

CUT = missed the half-way cut
T = tied

=== Summary ===
Tournament	Wins	2nd	3rd	Top-5	Top-10	Top-25	Events	Cuts made
Kraft Nabisco Championship	0	0	0	0	0	1	8	5
U.S. Women's Open	0	0	0	0	2	3	9	5
Women's British Open	0	0	0	0	1	2	6	4
LPGA Championship	0	0	0	1	3	4	7	6
The Evian Championship	0	0	0	0	0	0	0	0
Totals	0	0	0	1	6	10	30	20

- Most consecutive cuts made – 7 (2006 LPGA – 2007 British Open)
- Longest streak of top-10s – 2 (2008 LPGA – 2008 U.S. Open)

== Team appearances ==
Professional

- Solheim Cup (representing the United States): 2007 (winners), 2009 (winners)
- Lexus Cup (representing International team): 2007, 2008 (winners)

=== Solheim Cup record ===
Year	Total Matches	Total W-L-H	Singles W-L-H	Foursomes W-L-H	Fourballs W-L-H	Points Won	Points %
Career	7	2-5-0	1-1-0	0-2-0	1-2-0	2.0	28.6
2007	4	2-2-0	1-0-0 def. B. Hauert 3&2	0-1-0 lost w/ C. Kerr 1 dn	1-1-0 won w/ C. Kerr 3&2 lost w/ N. Gulbis 2 dn	2.0	50.0
2009	3	0-3-0	0-1-0 lost to D. Luna 3&2	0-1-0 lost w/ A. Stanford 3&1	0-1-0 lost w/ C. Kerr 1 dn	0.0	0.0
