= Nicole Gergely =

Austrian golfer

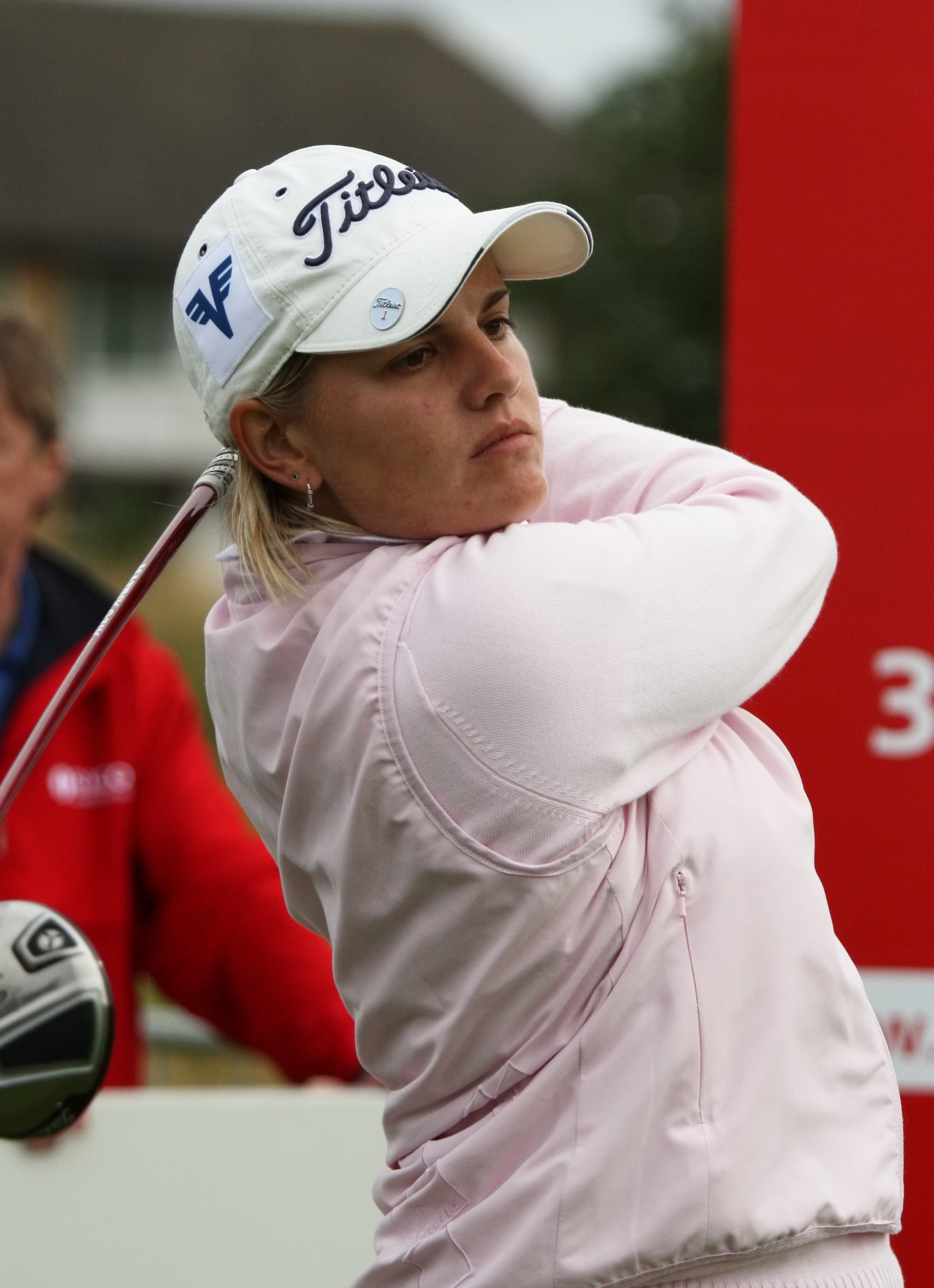
- Nicole Gergely at the 2009 Women's British Open

Personal information
- Nationality: Austria
- Born: 12 November 1984 (age 41) Judenburg, Styria, Austria

Career
- Sport: Golf
- Turned professional: 2005
- Former tour: Ladies European Tour (joined 2006)
- Professional wins: 1

Number of wins by tour
- Ladies European Tour: 1

Best results in LPGA major championships
- Chevron Championship: DNP
- Women's PGA C'ship: DNP
- U.S. Women's Open: DNP
- Women's British Open: CUT: 2009
- Evian Championship: DNP

Nicole Gergely (born 12 November 1984) is an Austrian professional golfer. She became the first Austrian to win on the Ladies European Tour when she won the Open de France Dames in 2009.

== Biography ==
Gergely was Austrian champion as an amateur and won several international tournaments. She turned professional in 2005 and qualified for the 2006 European Tour. Following her tour career she became a Fully Qualified PGA Golf Professional and coach for the Austrian National Team.

== Professional wins (1) ==
=== Ladies European Tour wins (1) ===
No.	Date	Tournament	Winning score	To par	Margin of victory	Runner-up
1	20 Sep 2009	Open de France Dames	71-67-70-67=275	−13	2 strokes	(Finland) Ursula Wikström

== Team appearances ==
Amateur

- European Girls' Team Championship (representing Austria): 2002
