= Becky Brewerton =

Welsh professional golfer

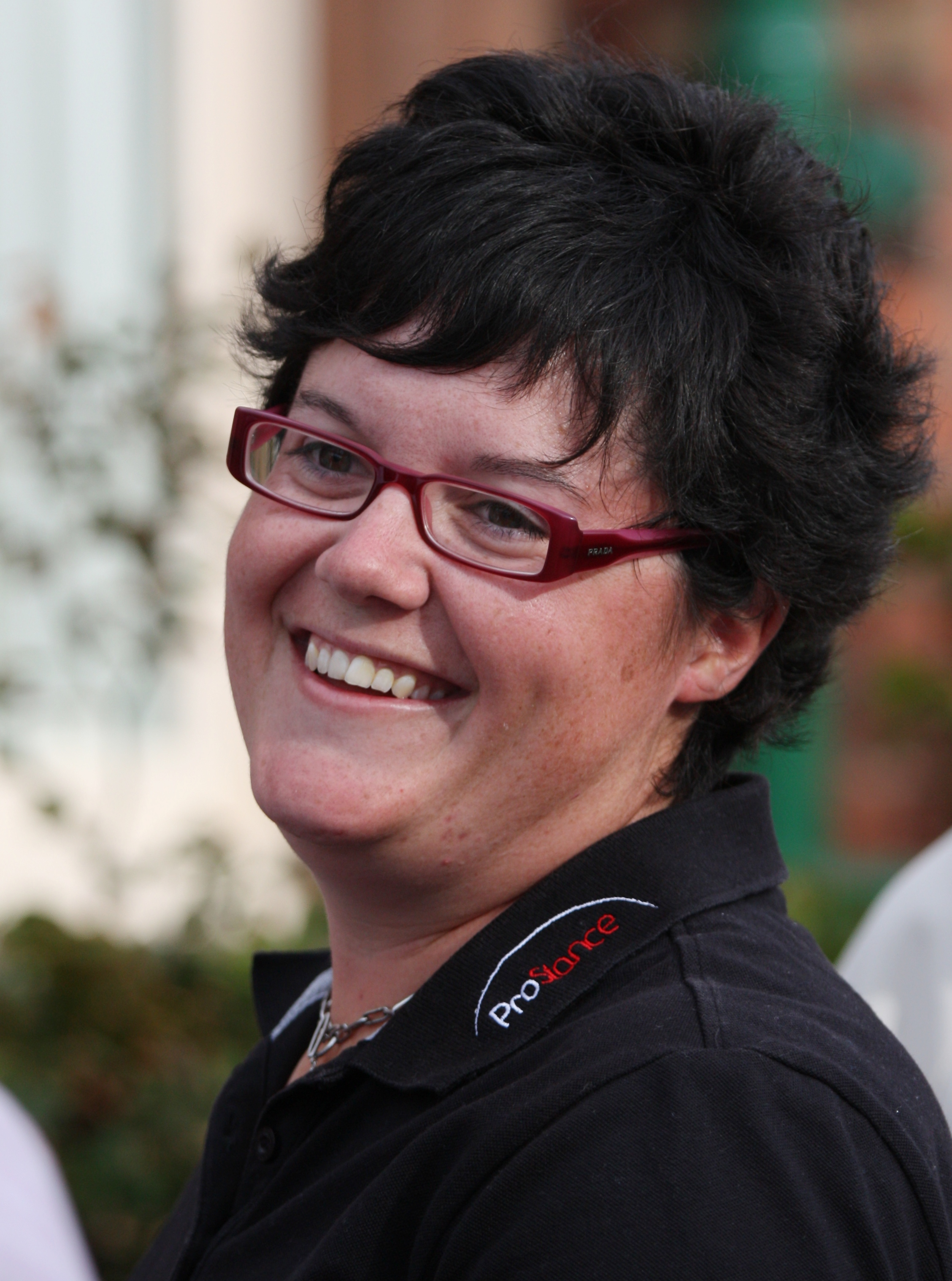
- Brewerton after the 2009 Women's British Open

Personal information
- Nationality: Wales
- Born: 20 October 1982 (age 44) St Asaph, Wales
- Height: 5 ft 6 in (1.68 m)

Career
- Sport: Golf
- Turned professional: 2003
- Current tours: Ladies European Tour (joined 2004); LPGA Tour (joined 2011)
- Professional wins: 4

Number of wins by tour
- Ladies European Tour: 2

Best results in LPGA major championships
- Chevron Championship: T72: 2010
- Women's PGA C'ship: DNP
- U.S. Women's Open: 70th: 2014
- Women's British Open: T16: 2007
- Evian Championship: DNP

Rebecca Dawn Brewerton (born 20 October 1982) is a Welsh professional golfer. She is a member of the Ladies European Tour and the LPGA Tour.

== Early life and amateur career ==
Brewerton was born in St Asaph, Wales. She had a successful amateur career. She was Welsh Girls Champion in 1997 and 1998 and Welsh Ladies' Amateur Champion in 1999 and 2001. She won the Ladies' British Open Amateur Stroke Play Championship in 1999 and 2002, a year she also won the European Ladies Amateur Championship

Brewerton represented Great Britain and Ireland in the Curtis Cup in 2000, and the Vagliano Trophy in 2001 and 2003. She was in line to be selected to the 2002 Curtis Cup squad but was not selected for the final team. She played in the 2002 Espirito Santo Trophy World Amateur Golf Team Championships and was named as the Daily Telegraph Golfer of the year.

Brewerton received two invitations to play on the Ladies European Tour in 2003. She held the halfway lead at the Tenerife Ladies Open in May finally finishing the tournament in second place and was beaten into second place again at the Wales WPGA Championship by a 74-foot birdie putt on the final green by Shani Waugh.

== Professional career ==
In 2003, Brewerton turned professional after she finished 13th at the Ladies European Tour Qualifying School.

In her 2004, rookie season, Brewerton was second in the Ryder Cup Wales Rookie of the Year competition and finished eighth on the LET Order of Merit with four top ten finishes. She had four more top tens in 2005 which gave her a 19th-place finish on the money list. In 2006, she had five top tens and finished 15th on the New Star Money List.

In 2005, together with Becky Morgan, Brewerton finished sixth in the Women's World Cup of Golf in South Africa. The pair improved on that performance in 2006 finishing third, added an eighth-place finish in 2007 and a sixth place in 2008.

Brewerton's maiden professional victory was a three stroke win at the 2007 Ladies English Open. This, plus four other top ten finishes, earned her a place on the 2007 European Solheim Cup Team, the first Welsh golfer to play on a Solheim Cup team. She placed second in the BBC Wales Sports Personality of the Year in 2007, and was voted The Towergate Professional Player of the Year.

Brewerton's second LET victory was at the 2009 Open De España Femenino. This earned her the final place in the Evian Masters the following week which she led for three of the four days before finishing 13th, the highest finish by an LET player. These performances led to her selection as a captain's pick for the 2009 European Solheim Cup team and to the BBC Wales Sports Personality of the Year Award shortlist.

In December 2010, she finished 20th at the Final LPGA Qualifying Tournament to earn membership on the LPGA Tour for 2011 with low playing priority.

== Professional wins (4) ==
=== Ladies European Tour wins (2) ===
- 2007 (1) Ladies English Open
- 2009 (1) Open De España Femenino

=== Other wins (2) ===
- 2011 (1) Tenerife Ladies Match Play (unofficial Ladies European Tour)
- 2021 (1) Rose Ladies Series at Brockenhurst Manor

== Ladies European Tour career summary ==
Year	LET wins	Earnings (€)	Order of Merit rank	Average
2004	0	86,278.77	8	72.19
2005	0	69,381.19	19	72.05
2006	0	96,700.47	15	71.88
2007	1	145,085.93	15	72.36
2008	0	126,754.04	15	71.64
2009	1	175,955.10	3	71.14

- Official as of 20 September 2009.

== Team appearances ==
Amateur

- European Ladies' Team Championship (representing Wales): 1999, 2001, 2003
- Curtis Cup (representing Great Britain & Ireland): 2000
- Vagliano Trophy (representing Great Britain & Ireland): 2001, 2003 (winners)
- European Lady Junior's Team Championship (representing Wales): 2002
- Espirito Santo Trophy (representing Great Britain & Ireland): 2002

Professional

- Solheim Cup (representing Europe): 2007, 2009
- World Cup (representing Wales): 2005, 2006, 2007, 2008

=== Solheim Cup record ===
Year	Total matches	Total W-L-H	Singles W-L-H	Foursomes W-L-H	Fourballs W-L-H	Points won	Points %
Career	7	3–3–1	0–1–1	2–1–0	1–1–0	3.5	50%
2007	3	1–1–1	0–0–1 halved w/S. Steinhauer	0–1–0 lost w/L. Davies 2&1	1–0–0 won w/L. Davies 2up	1.5	50%
2009	4	2–2–0	0–1–0 lost to A. Stanford 5&4	2–0–0 won w/G. Nocera 3&1, won w/G. Nocera 5&4	0–1–0 lost w/L. Davies 5&4	2.0	50%
