= 2007 Solheim Cup =

Women's team golf competition

- Dates: 14–16 September 2007
- Venue: Halmstad GK
- Location: Halmstad, Sweden
- Captains: Helen Alfredsson (Europe); Betsy King (USA)
(Europe)	12	16	(United States)
- United States wins the Solheim Cup

Location map
- Location within Europe Location within Sweden

The 2007 Solheim Cup was the tenth Solheim Cup, held 14–16 September at Halmstad GK in Halmstad, Sweden. It was a three-day contest for professional female golfers, pitting the 12 best players born in the United States against the 12 best players born in Europe. The U.S. team won the competition, 16 to 12, to retain the Solheim Cup.

== Format ==
The Solheim Cup is a match play event, as opposed to the more common stroke play format. A total of 28 points are available, divided among four periods of team play, followed by one period of singles play. The first period, on Friday morning, consists of four rounds of foursomes. This is followed in the afternoon by four rounds of four-ball. This schedule is repeated on Saturday morning and afternoon. The four periods on Friday and Saturday account for 16 points. During these team periods, the players play in teams of two. The captain of each team can play a player as many or as few times as she desires. The final 12 points are decided in a round of singles match play, in which all 24 players (12 from each team) take part.

== Teams ==
The European and United States teams were selected by different methods.

The European Team was selected by taking the top five players from the LET Solheim Cup standings, followed by the top four European LET members on the Rolex Women's World Rankings at the agreed cut off date who were not already qualified via The Solheim Cup standings, and three captain's selections. Qualifying points for the European Team are awarded weekly to the top-10 finishers at official LET events.

The U.S. Team qualified by earning points for wins and for top-20 finishes on the LPGA Tour over a two-year period. Points were earned beginning with the 2005 State Farm Classic and concluding with the 2007 Safeway Classic. The ten players with the highest points were automatically selected for the Team. Two additional players were selected by captain Betsy King after the Safeway Classic on August 26, 2007.

Team Europe
Name	Age	Residence or Hometown*	LET ranking	Rolex ranking	Notes
(Sweden) Helen Alfredsson	42	Gothenburg, Sweden			non-playing captain
(France) Marie-Laure de Lorenzi	46	Biarritz, France			non-playing assistant captain
(France) Gwladys Nocera	32	Moulins, France	1	51
(England) Trish Johnson	41	Bristol, England	2	81
(Germany) Bettina Hauert	25	Hagen, Germany	3	118	Solheim Cup rookie
(England) Laura Davies	43	Surrey, England	4	40
(Wales) Becky Brewerton	24	Abergele, Wales	5	80	Solheim Cup rookie
(Sweden) Annika Sörenstam	36	Stockholm, Sweden	7	3
(Norway) Suzann Pettersen	26	Oslo, Norway	12	6
(Scotland) Catriona Matthew	38	North Berwick, Scotland	9	25
(Sweden) Sophie Gustafson	33	Kungsbacka, Sweden	11	31
(Sweden) Maria Hjorth	33	Falun, Sweden	6	41	captain's pick
(Denmark) Iben Tinning	33	Copenhagen, Denmark	14	148	captain's pick
(Sweden) Linda Wessberg	27	Gothenburg, Sweden	8	70	captain's pick / Solheim Cup rookie

*Residence/Hometown according to official Solheim Cup designation.
LET rankings as of August 19, 2007
Rolex rankings as of August 20, 2007

Team USA
Name	Age	Residence or Hometown*	Points rank	Points	Rolex ranking	Notes
Betsy King	52	Limekiln, Pennsylvania				non-playing captain
Beth Daniel	50	Charleston, South Carolina				non-playing assistant captain
Paula Creamer	21	Pleasanton, California	1	741.00	7
Cristie Kerr	29	Miami, Florida	2	713.50	4
Morgan Pressel	19	Boca Raton, Florida	3	532.50	8	Solheim Cup rookie
Juli Inkster	47	Pasatiempo, California	4	512.00	10
Stacy Prammanasudh	27	Enid, Oklahoma	5	483.50	18	Solheim Cup rookie
Pat Hurst	38	Scottsdale, Arizona	6	449.00	28
Natalie Gulbis	24	Lake Las Vegas, Nevada	7	412.50	26
Brittany Lincicome	21	Seminole, Florida	8	396.50	15	Solheim Cup rookie
Angela Stanford	29	Saginaw, Texas	9	372.00	32
Sherri Steinhauer	44	Madison, Wisconsin	10	324.50	30
Nicole Castrale	28	Palm Desert, California	11	277.00	22	captain's pick / Solheim Cup rookie
Laura Diaz	32	Scotia, New York	13	240.00	38	captain's pick

*Residence/Hometown according to official Solheim Cup designation.
Rolex rankings as of August 20, 2007. Rolex ranking does not factor into US Team selection. Shown for comparison purposes only.

== Day one ==
Friday, 14 September 2007

=== Morning foursomes ===
	Results
Gustafson/Pettersen	halved	Kerr/Hurst
Sörenstam/Matthew	(United States) 4 & 2	Diaz/Steinhauer
Davies/Brewerton	(United States) 2 & 1	Inkster/Creamer
Nocera/Hjorth	(Europe) 3 & 2	Gulbis/Pressel
1 1/2	Session	2 1/2
1 1/2	Overall	2 1/2

=== Afternoon fourball ===
	Results
Matthew/Tinning	(Europe) 4 & 2	Hurst/Lincicome
Sörenstam/Hjorth	halved	Stanford/Prammanasudh
Gustafson/Nocera	(United States) 3 & 2	Castrale/Kerr
Johnson/Davies	halved	Creamer/Pressel
2	Session	2
3 1/2	Overall	4 1/2

== Day two ==
Saturday, 15 September 2007

=== Morning foursomes ===
	Results
Nocera/Hjorth	halved	Diaz/Steinhauer
Pettersen/Gustafson	halved	Inkster/Creamer
Tinning/Hauert	(United States) 4 & 2	Hurst/Stanford
Sörenstam/Matthew	(Europe) 1 up	Castrale/Kerr
2	Session	2
5 1/2	Overall	6 1/2

=== Afternoon fourball ===
	Results
Wessberg/Hjorth	halved	Creamer/Lincicome
Johnson/Tinning	halved	Inkster/Prammanasudh
Brewerton/Davies	(Europe) 2 up	Gulbis/Castrale
Sörenstam/Pettersen	(Europe) 3 & 2	Kerr/Pressel
3	Session	1
8 1/2	Overall	7 1/2

== Day three ==
Sunday, 16 September 2007

=== Singles ===
	Results
Catriona Matthew	(Europe) 3 & 2	Laura Diaz
Sophie Gustafson	(United States) 2 & 1	Pat Hurst
Suzann Pettersen	(United States) 2 up	Stacy Prammanasudh
Iben Tinning	(United States) 4 & 3	Juli Inkster
Becky Brewerton	halved	Sherri Steinhauer
Trish Johnson	(United States) 3 & 2	Angela Stanford
Annika Sörenstam	(United States) 2 & 1	Morgan Pressel
Laura Davies	(Europe) 4 & 3	Brittany Lincicome
Bettina Hauert	(United States) 3 & 2	Nicole Castrale
Maria Hjorth	(United States) 2 & 1	Paula Creamer
Linda Wessberg	(Europe) 1 up	Cristie Kerr
Gwladys Nocera	(United States) 4 & 3	Natalie Gulbis
3 1/2	Session	8 1/2
12	Overall	16

== Individual player records ==
Each entry refers to the win–loss–half record of the player.

=== Europe ===
Player	Points	Overall	Singles	Foursomes	Fourballs
Becky Brewerton	1.5	1–1–1	0–0–1	0–1–0	1–0–0
Laura Davies	2.5	2–1–1	1–0–0	0–1–0	1–0–1
Sophie Gustafson	1	0–2–2	0–1–0	0–0–2	0–1–0
Bettina Hauert	0	0–2–0	0–1–0	0–1–0	0–0–0
Maria Hjorth	2.5	1–1–3	0–1–0	1–0–1	0–0–2
Trish Johnson	1	0–1–2	0–1–0	0–0–0	0–0–2
Catriona Matthew	3	3–1–0	1–0–0	1–1–0	1–0–0
Gwladys Nocera	1.5	1–2–1	0–1–0	1–0–1	0–1–0
Suzann Pettersen	2	1–1–2	0–1–0	0–0–2	1–0–0
Annika Sörenstam	2.5	2–2–1	0–1–0	1–1–0	1–0–1
Iben Tinning	1.5	1–2–1	0–1–0	0–1–0	1–0–1
Linda Wessberg	1.5	1–0–1	1–0–0	0–0–0	0–0–1

=== United States ===
Player	Points	Overall	Singles	Foursomes	Fourballs
Nicole Castrale	2	2–2–0	1–0–0	0–1–0	1–1–0
Paula Creamer	3.5	2–0–3	1–0–0	1–0–1	0–0–2
Laura Diaz	1.5	1–1–1	0–1–0	1–0–1	0–0–0
Natalie Gulbis	1	1–2–0	1–0–0	0–1–0	0–1–0
Pat Hurst	2.5	2–1–1	1–0–0	1–0–1	0–1–0
Juli Inkster	3	2–0–2	1–0–0	1–0–1	0–0–1
Cristie Kerr	1.5	1–3–1	0–1–0	0–1–1	1–1–0
Brittany Lincicome	0.5	0–2–1	0–1–0	0–0–0	0–1–1
Stacy Prammanasudh	2	1–0–2	1–0–0	0–0–0	0–0–2
Morgan Pressel	1.5	1–2–1	1–0–0	0–1–0	0–1–1
Angela Stanford	2.5	2–0–1	1–0–0	1–0–0	0–0–1
Sherri Steinhauer	2	1–0–2	0–0–1	1–0–1	0–0–0

== See also ==
- 2007 in golf
