= Natalie Gulbis =

American professional golfer (born 1983)

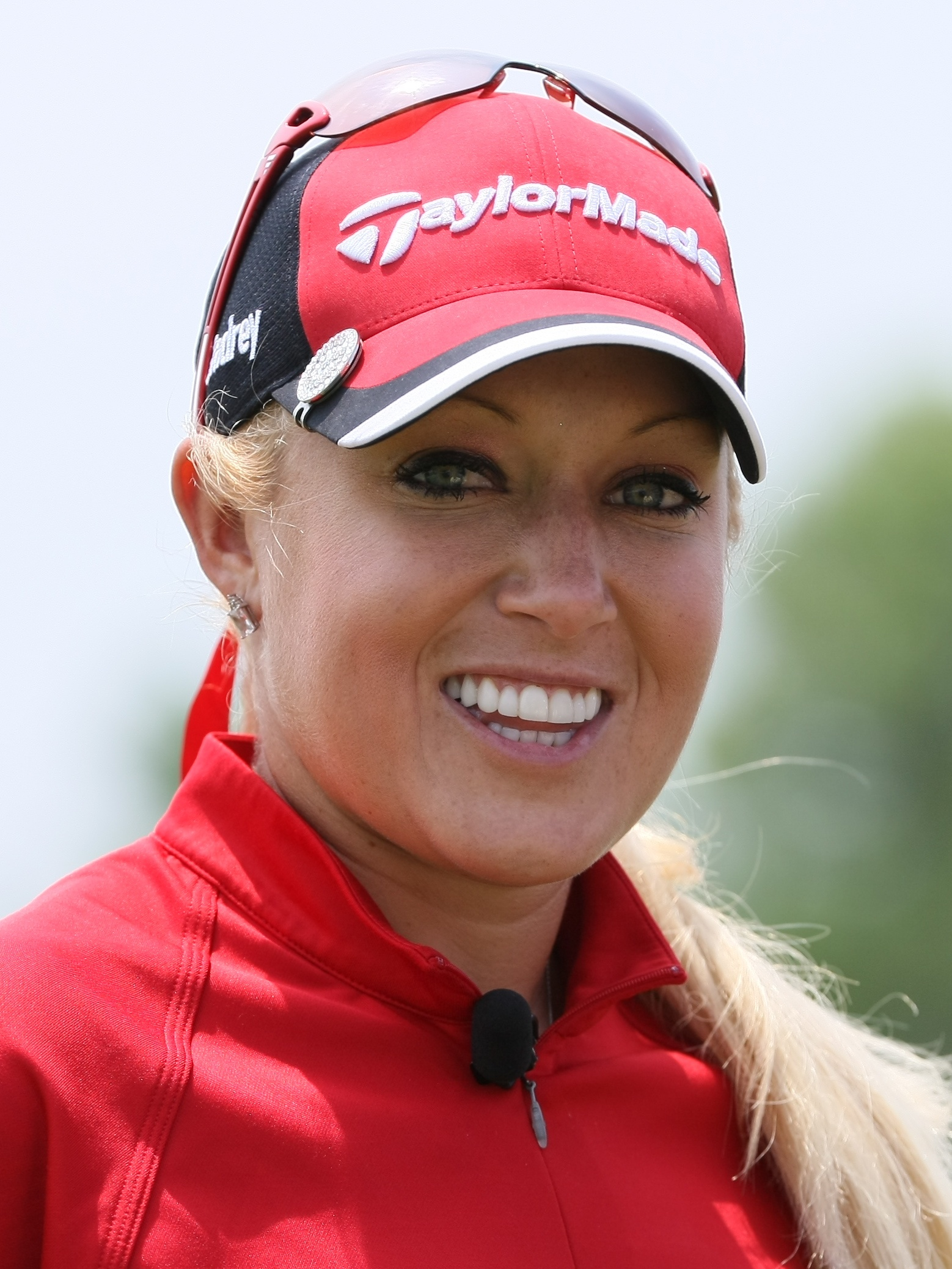
- Gulbis at the 2009 LPGA Championship

Personal information
- Full name: Natalie Anne Gulbis
- Nationality: United States
- Born: January 7, 1983 (age 43) Sacramento, California, U.S.
- Height: 5 ft 9 in (1.75 m)

Career
- Sport: Golf
- College: University of Arizona (one year)
- Turned professional: 2001
- Current tour: LPGA Tour
- Professional wins: 1

Number of wins by tour
- LPGA Tour: 1

Best results in LPGA major championships
- Chevron Championship: T3: 2006
- Women's PGA C'ship: T5: 2005
- U.S. Women's Open: T4: 2005
- Women's British Open: T8: 2005
- Evian Championship: T52: 2013

Achievements and awards
- William and Mousie Powell Award: 2007

Natalie Anne Gulbis (born January 7, 1983) is an American professional golfer who played on the U.S.-based LPGA Tour.

== Golf career ==
Gulbis was born and raised in the Sacramento, California, area. She has Latvian ancestry. Gulbis became interested in the game at the early age of four. By the time she reached age seven, she had won her first tournament, and at age ten, she reports she was breaking par. Gulbis won the California Women's Amateur Championship at the age of 14 in 1997. The same year, she played in her first event on the LPGA Tour.

Gulbis was the top player on the boys' golf team at Granite Bay High School and graduated at age 16. She then accepted a golf scholarship to the University of Arizona, the 2000 national champions, where she was a teammate of fellow freshman, Lorena Ochoa. After one season at Arizona, Gulbis left college to turn professional in July 2001 at age 18. At the LPGA Final Qualifying Tournament in October 2001 at Daytona Beach, Florida, Gulbis finished tied for third to earn her card for the 2002 season.

Although Gulbis did not win a tournament until her sixth season on tour, she finished sixth on the LPGA money list in her fourth season with over $1 million in earnings in 2005. She placed in the top 10 in four consecutive major championships from the 2005 LPGA Championship to the 2006 Kraft Nabisco Championship.

Her first professional win came at the July 2007 Evian Masters in France, where she defeated Jeong Jang in a playoff. Gulbis tapped in for a two-putt birdie on the first extra hole to claim the winner's prize of $450,000.

Gulbis has played on three victorious U.S. Solheim Cup teams – 2005, 2007, and 2009.

Gulbis announced she will retire after the 2020 LPGA Tour season.

== Personal life, business and media ==
Gulbis is an only child. She was considered to be a sex symbol in the LPGA. Natalie released a 2005 calendar, just before the 2004 U.S. Women's Open, which featured her not only playing golf, but also striking poses in swimwear. The United States Golf Association (USGA) barred it from being sold at the event, deeming it inappropriate. The calendar was sold openly at Golf Canada; the USGA was criticized for overreacting. Gulbis also posed for the November 2004 issue of the magazine FHM, an issue that also gave away a chance to play golf with her at her home course, the Lake Las Vegas Resort, where her calendar photo shoot took place. Gulbis has endorsement deals with McGladrey LLP, TaylorMade/Adidas, Canon, Michelob Ultra, SkyCaddie, Payment Data Systems, MasterCard, Winn Golf Grips, Lake Las Vegas Resort, Pure Silk, Lexus, and EA Sports.

In 2006, Gulbis began writing a monthly advice column in FHM. In November 2005 a reality television show, The Natalie Gulbis Show, made its debut on The Golf Channel. The show had its second-season premiere on October 18, 2006. Gulbis also has appeared on the 2007 version of Tiger Woods PGA Tour by EA Sports, along with fellow professionals, Annika Sörenstam, Ian Poulter, and Luke Donald, among others. In August 2007 Gulbis appeared on the August/September cover of Sactown Magazine.

In 2009, Gulbis appeared in the second season of Celebrity Apprentice. Throughout the season, each celebrity raised money for a charity of their choice; Gulbis selected the Boys and Girls Club. She was fired on the April 19, 2009 episode of the show.

Gulbis appeared on the April 28, 2009, episode of The Price Is Right as a Showcase theme. She also participated in a playing Hole in One to perform the game's "inspiration putt". She appeared on Sports Jobs with Junior Seau, where Seau worked as her caddy during the pro-am round for the Safeway Classic in Oregon.

In 2010, she appeared in the tenth season of CSI: Crime Scene Investigation at the 12th episode "Long Ball".

Gulbis appeared in the 2012 Sports Illustrated Swimsuit Issue wearing only body paint.

Gulbis contracted malaria during the HSBC Women's Champions tournament in Singapore in late February 2013 and missed a tournament while recovering.

In July 2013, Gulbis became engaged to Josh Rodarmel, a former quarterback for Yale University. They were married in December.

In 2016, Gulbis spoke at the Republican National Convention in support of Donald Trump. There was speculation that she would run for the open 3rd congressional district of Nevada as a Republican in 2018.

In May 2018, President Donald Trump appointed Gulbis to serve as a member of his Council on Sports, Fitness & Nutrition.

== Professional wins (1) ==
=== LPGA Tour wins (1) ===
No.	Date	Tournament	Winning score	To par	Margin of victory	Runner-up	Winner's share (S)
1	July 29, 2007	Evian Masters	72-69-73-70=284	−4	Playoff	(South Korea) Jeong Jang	450,000

LPGA Tour playoff record (1–1)

No.	Year	Tournament	Opponent(s)	Result
1	2006	Jamie Farr Owens Corning Classic	(South Korea) Mi-Hyun Kim	Lost to birdie on third extra hole
2	2007	Evian Masters	(South Korea) Jeong Jang	Won with birdie on first extra hole

== Results in LPGA majors ==
Results not in chronological order before 2015.

Tournament	2001	2002	2003	2004	2005	2006	2007	2008	2009	2010	2011	2012
ANA Inspiration			T48	T58	T17	T3	CUT	T13	T46	CUT	T47	T8
U.S. Women's Open	T34	CUT	T13	T37	T4	T16	T35	CUT		T14	T32	CUT
Women's PGA Championship		T15	T20	T61	T5	T20		CUT	T21	T25	T68	CUT
Women's British Open		T13	CUT	T13	T8	T16	T23	T9	CUT		CUT	CUT

Tournament	2013	2014	2015	2016	2017	2018	2019	2020	2021
ANA Inspiration	T32	CUT							
U.S. Women's Open	T61	CUT	CUT						
Women's PGA Championship	CUT		CUT						
The Evian Championship ^	T52		CUT		CUT	CUT		NT	CUT
Women's British Open	T9		CUT						

^ The Evian Championship was added as a major in 2013

Top 10
Did not play

CUT = missed the half-way cut
NT = no tournament
"T" tied

=== Summary ===
Tournament	Wins	2nd	3rd	Top-5	Top-10	Top-25	Events	Cuts made
ANA Inspiration	0	0	1	1	2	4	12	9
U.S. Women's Open	0	0	0	1	1	4	14	9
Women's PGA Championship	0	0	0	1	1	6	12	8
The Evian Championship	0	0	0	0	0	0	5	1
Women's British Open	0	0	0	0	3	7	12	7
Totals	0	0	1	3	7	21	55	34

- Most consecutive cuts made – 12 (2004 Kraft Nabisco – 2006 British Open)
- Longest streak of top-10s – 4 (2005 LPGA - 2006 Kraft Nabisco)

== LPGA Tour career summary ==
Year	Tournaments played	Cuts made*	Wins	2nd	3rd	Top 10s	Best finish	Earnings ($)	Money list rank	Scoring average	Scoring rank
1997	1	0	0	0	0	0	MC	n/a	n/a	82.50	n/a
1998	1	0	0	0	0	0	MC	n/a	n/a	80.00	n/a
2001	1	1	0	0	0	0	T34	n/a	n/a	73.00	n/a
2002	26	17	0	0	0	4	T5	257,310	39	72.34	43
2003	26	22	0	0	0	0	T12	251,562	39	71.91	36
2004	27	22	0	0	0	2	T7	277,093	42	71.72	36
2005	27	26	0	0	2	12	T3	1,010,154	6	71.24	5
2006	26	25	0	1	1	7	2	693,968	16	71.00	9
2007	22	19	1	1	1	5	1	886,404	12	72.21	28
2008	20	14	0	0	0	1	T9	266,237	56	72.03	41
2009	21	18	0	0	0	2	T7	326,392	40	71.32	19
2010	18	14	0	0	0	0	T12	178,044	51	72.39	48
2011	20	16	0	0	0	0	T15	191,101	51	72.65	49
2012	22	16	0	0	0	3	T4	321,472	42	72.27	45
2013	20	16	0	0	0	1	T9	187,237	63	72.79	83
2014	12	6	0	0	0	0	T19	20,447	138	74.03	147
2015	14	6	0	0	0	0	T25	39,575	118	73.38	121
2016	8	0	0	0	0	0	MC	0	n/a	73.64	n/a
2017	5	0	0	0	0	0	MC	0	n/a	73.70	n/a
2018	8	1	0	0	0	0	T42	6,275	168	73.33	n/a
2019	6	0	0	0	0	0	MC	0	n/a	73.11	n/a
2020	7	1	0	0	0	0	72	4,927	n/a	76.60	136
2021	6	1	0	0	0	0	T55	4,092	n/a	75.43	n/a
2022	1	0	0	0	0	0	CUT	0	n/a	–	n/a
2023	5	0	0	0	0	0	CUT	0	n/a	76.14	n/a
2024	2	0	0	0	0	0	CUT	0	n/a	76.50	n/a
2025	4	0	0	0	0	0	CUT	0	n/a	76.40	n/a

- Official through 2025 season

* Includes matchplay and other events without a cut.

== World ranking ==
Position in Women's World Golf Rankings at the end of each calendar year.

Year	World ranking	Source
2006	19	
2007	22	
2008	42	
2009	58	
2010	98	
2011	118	
2012	96	
2013	110	
2014	230	
2015	363	
2016	658	
2017	unranked	
2018	733	
2019	1060	
2020	1060	

== Team appearances ==
Professional

- Solheim Cup (representing the United States): 2005 (winners), 2007 (winners), 2009 (winners)
- Lexus Cup (representing International team): 2005 (winners), 2006, 2007, 2008 (winners)
- World Cup (representing the United States): 2006
- Wendy's 3-Tour Challenge (representing the LPGA Tour): 2006, 2007 (winners), 2008, 2009 (winners), 2010, 2011, 2012, 2013 (winners)

=== Solheim Cup Record ===
Year	Total matches	Total W-L-H	Singles W-L-H	Foursomes W-L-H	Fourballs W-L-H	Points won	Points %
Career	10	5–4–1	2–0–1	2–3–0	1–1–0	5.5	55.0
2005	4	3–1–0	1–0–0 def. M. Hjorth 2&1	1–1–0 lost w/ C.Kerr 2&1 won w/ C. Kim 4&2	1–0–0 won w/ C. Kerr 2&1	3.0	75.0
2007	3	1–2–0	1–0–0 def. G. Nocera 4&3	0–1–0 lost w/ M. Pressel 3&2	0–1–0 lost w/ N. Castrale 2up	1.0	33.3
2009	3	1–1–1	0–0–1 halved w/. J.Moodie	1–1–0 won w/ C. Kim 4&2 lost w/ C. Kim 5&4	0–0–0	1.5	50.0
