= 2009 Solheim Cup =

Women's team golf competition

Coordinates: 41.754°N 88.487°W

- Dates: August 21–23, 2009
- Venue: Rich Harvest Farms
- Location: Sugar Grove, Illinois
- Captains: Beth Daniel (USA); Alison Nicholas (Europe)
(United States)	16	12	(Europe)
- United States wins the Solheim Cup

Location map
- Location within the United States Location within Illinois

The 11th Solheim Cup Matches were held August 21–23, 2009 at Rich Harvest Farms in Sugar Grove, Illinois, west of Chicago. The biennial matches are a three-day team competition for professional female golfers, pitting the 12 best players born in the United States against the 12 best players of European nationality.

The United States claimed the Cup for the third consecutive meeting, winning 16–12. Entering the final day, the competition was tied at 8 points each, but the U.S. won eight of the dozen singles matches to retain the Solheim Cup.

== Teams ==
The United States and European teams were selected by different methods.

Team USA qualified by earning points for wins and for top-20 finishes on the LPGA Tour over a two-year period. Points were earned beginning with the 2007 State Farm Classic and concluding with the 2009 Women's British Open. The ten players with the highest points were automatically selected for Team USA. Two additional players were selected by captain Beth Daniel after the conclusion of the Women's British Open on August 2, 2009.

Team Europe was selected by taking the top five players from the LET Solheim Cup standings, followed by the top four European LET members on the Rolex Women’s World Rankings at the agreed cut off date who were not already qualified via The Solheim Cup standings, and three captain’s selections. Qualifying points for Team Europe were awarded weekly to the top-10 finishers at official LET events.

=== Team USA ===
Team USA
Name	Age	From*	Points rank	Points	Rolex ranking	Notes
Beth Daniel	52	Florida				non-playing captain
Kelly Robbins	39	Michigan				non-playing assistant captain
Meg Mallon	46	Florida				non-playing assistant captain
Paula Creamer	22	California	1	826.5	5
Cristie Kerr	31	Florida	2	735.5	3
Angela Stanford	31	Texas	3	579.0	8
Kristy McPherson	28	South Carolina	4	321.0	18	Solheim Cup rookie
Nicole Castrale	30	California	5	314.0	44
Christina Kim	25	California	6	312.0	42
Brittany Lang	23	Texas	7	301.5	30	Solheim Cup rookie
Morgan Pressel	21	Florida	8	277.0	26
Brittany Lincicome	23	Florida	9	250.0	23
Natalie Gulbis	26	Nevada	10	201.0	48
Michelle Wie	19	Hawaii	13	166.5	24	captain's pick / Solheim Cup rookie
Juli Inkster	49	California	16	152.0	45	captain's pick

*Residence/Hometown according to official 2009 Solheim Cup designation.
Rolex rankings as of August 2, 2009. Rolex ranking does not factor into US Team selection. Shown for comparison purposes only. Lang was 24 on the second day.

=== Team Europe ===
Team Europe
Name	Age	Residence or Hometown*	LET ranking	Rolex ranking	Notes
(England) Alison Nicholas	47	Birmingham, England			non-playing captain
(Sweden) Liselotte Neumann	43	Finspång, Sweden			non-playing assistant captain
(England) Joanne Morley	42	Cheshire, England			non-playing assistant captain
(France) Gwladys Nocera	34	Moulins, France	1	130
(Spain) Tania Elósegui	27	San Sebastián, Spain	2	191	Solheim Cup rookie
(Italy) Diana Luna	26	Cannes, Italy	3	218	Solheim Cup rookie
(England) Laura Davies	45	Surrey, England	4	92
(Sweden) Sophie Gustafson	35	Kungsbacka, Sweden	5	34
(Norway) Suzann Pettersen	28	Oslo, Norway	7	6
(Sweden) Helen Alfredsson	44	Gothenburg, Sweden	10	10
(Scotland) Catriona Matthew	39	North Berwick, Scotland	13	14
(Sweden) Maria Hjorth	35	Falun, Sweden	14	35
(Wales) Becky Brewerton	26	St Asaph, Wales	11	155	captain's pick
(Sweden) Anna Nordqvist	22	Eskilstuna, Sweden	20	22	captain's pick/Solheim Cup rookie
(Scotland) Janice Moodie	36	Glasgow, Scotland	67	88	captain's pick

*Residence/Hometown according to official Solheim Cup designation.
LET rankings as of August 2, 2009
Rolex rankings as of August 2, 2009

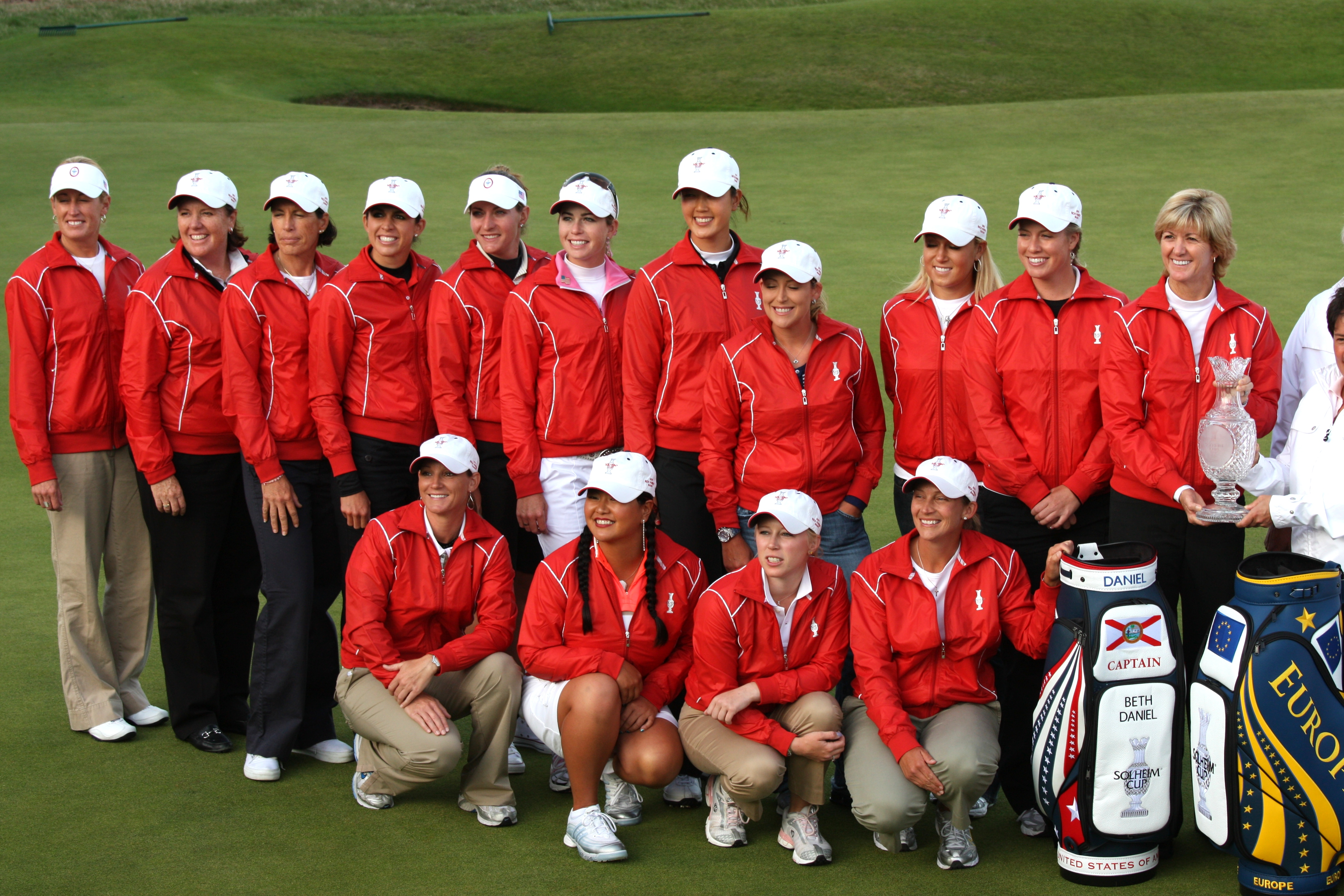
U.S. Team. Clockwise from upper left: Robbins, Mallon, Inkster, Castrale, Lang, Creamer, Wie, Kerr, Gulbis, Lincicome, Daniel, Stanford, Pressel, Kim, McPherson.

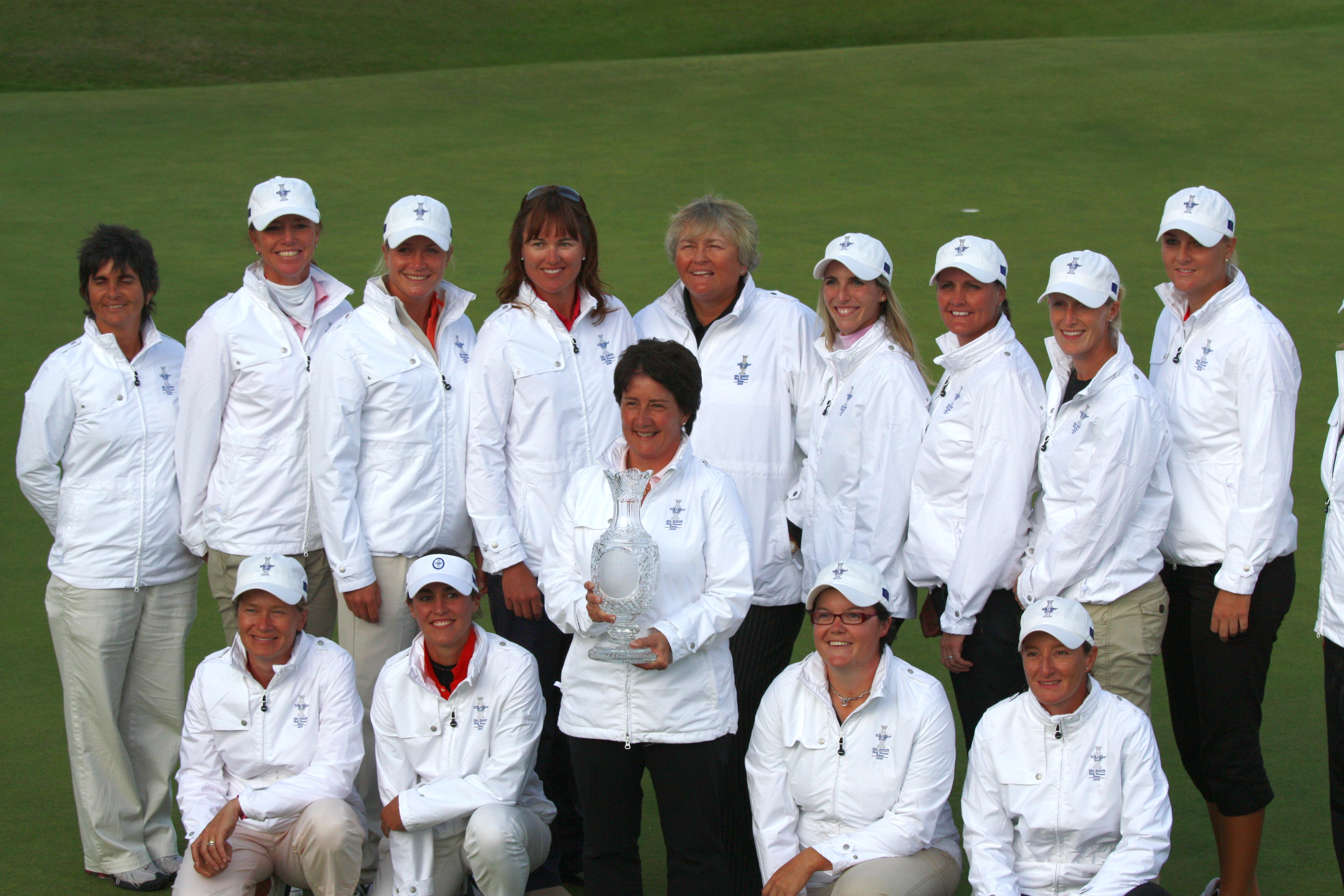
Clockwise from upper left: Morley, Alfredsson, Pettersen, Gustafson, Davies, Luna, Hjorth, Moodie, Nordqvist, Nocera, Brewerton, Nicholas, Elosegui, Matthew.

2009 Solheim Cup Teams

== Day one ==
Friday, August 21, 2009

=== Morning fourball ===
	Results
Gustafson/Pettersen	(United States) 1 up	Kerr/Creamer
Alfredsson/Elósegui	(Europe) 1 up	Stanford/Inkster
Davies/Brewerton	(United States) 5 & 4	Lang/Lincicome
Matthew/Hjorth	halved	Pressel/Wie
1 1/2	Session	2 1/2
1 1/2	Overall	2 1/2

=== Afternoon foursomes ===
	Results
Gustafson/Pettersen	(United States) 4 & 2	Kim/Gulbis
Brewerton/Nocera	(Europe) 3 & 1	Stanford/Castrale
Hjorth/Nordqvist	(Europe) 3 & 2	McPherson/Lincicome
Matthew/Moodie	(United States) 2 & 1	Creamer/Inkster
2	Session	2
3 1/2	Overall	4 1/2

== Day two ==
Saturday, August 22, 2009

=== Morning fourball ===
	Results
Alfredsson/Elósegui	(United States) 5 & 4	Kim/Wie
Matthew/Luna	halved	Stanford/Lang
Pettersen/Nordqvist	(Europe) 1 up	Kerr/Castrale
Nocera/Hjorth	(Europe) 1 up	Lincicome/McPherson
2 1/2	Session	1 1/2
6	Overall	6

=== Afternoon foursomes ===
	Results
Gustafson/Moodie	(Europe) 4 & 3	Creamer/Inkster
Alfredsson/Pettersen	(United States) 2 up	McPherson/Pressel
Brewerton/Nocera	(Europe) 5 & 4	Gulbis/Kim
Nordqvist/Hjorth	(United States) 1 up	Kerr/Wie
2	Session	2
8	Overall	8

== Day three ==
Sunday, August 23, 2009

=== Singles ===
	Results
Suzann Pettersen	(United States) 3 & 2	Paula Creamer
Becky Brewerton	(United States) 5 & 4	Angela Stanford
Helen Alfredsson	(United States) 1 up	Michelle Wie
Laura Davies	halved	Brittany Lang
Gwladys Nocera	halved	Juli Inkster
Catriona Matthew	(Europe) 3 & 2	Kristy McPherson
Sophie Gustafson	(United States) 3 & 2	Brittany Lincicome
Diana Luna	(Europe) 3 & 2	Nicole Castrale
Tania Elósegui	(United States) 2 up	Christina Kim
Maria Hjorth	halved	Cristie Kerr
Anna Nordqvist	(United States) 3 & 2	Morgan Pressel
Janice Moodie	halved	Natalie Gulbis
4	Session	8
12	Overall	16

== Individual player records ==
Each entry refers to the win–loss–half record of the player.

=== United States ===
Player	Points	Overall	Singles	Foursomes	Fourballs
Nicole Castrale	0	0–3–0	0–1–0	0–1–0	0–1–0
Paula Creamer	3	3–1–0	1–0–0	1–1–0	1–0–0
Natalie Gulbis	1.5	1–1–1	0–0–1	1–1–0	0–0–0
Juli Inkster	1.5	1–2–1	0–0–1	1–1–0	0–1–0
Cristie Kerr	2.5	2–1–1	0–0–1	1–0–0	1–1–0
Christina Kim	3	3–1–0	1–0–0	1–1–0	1–0–0
Brittany Lang	2	1–0–2	0–0–1	0–0–0	1–0–1
Brittany Lincicome	2	2–2–0	1–0–0	0–1–0	1–1–0
Kristy McPherson	1	1–3–0	0–1–0	1–1–0	0–1–0
Morgan Pressel	2.5	2–0–1	1–0–0	1–0–0	0–0–1
Angela Stanford	1.5	1–2–1	1–0–0	0–1–0	0–1–1
Michelle Wie	3.5	3–0–1	1–0–0	1–0–0	1–0–1

=== Europe ===
Player	Points	Overall	Singles	Foursomes	Fourballs
Helen Alfredsson	1	1–3–0	0–1–0	0–1–0	1–1–0
Becky Brewerton	2	2–2–0	0–1–0	2–0–0	0–1–0
Laura Davies	0.5	0–1–1	0–0–1	0–0–0	0–1–0
Tania Elósegui	1	1–2–0	0–1–0	0–0–0	1–1–0
Sophie Gustafson	1	1–3–0	0–1–0	1–1–0	0–1–0
Maria Hjorth	3	2–1–2	0–0–1	1–1–0	1–0–1
Diana Luna	1.5	1–0–1	1–0–0	0–0–0	0–0–1
Catriona Matthew	2	1–1–2	1–0–0	0–1–0	0–0–2
Janice Moodie	1.5	1–1–1	0–0–1	1–1–0	0–0–0
Gwladys Nocera	3.5	3–0–1	0–0–1	2–0–0	1–0–0
Anna Nordqvist	2	2–2–0	0–1–0	1–1–0	1–0–0
Suzann Pettersen	1	1–4–0	0–1–0	0–2–0	1–1–0
