= Diana Luna =

Italian professional golfer

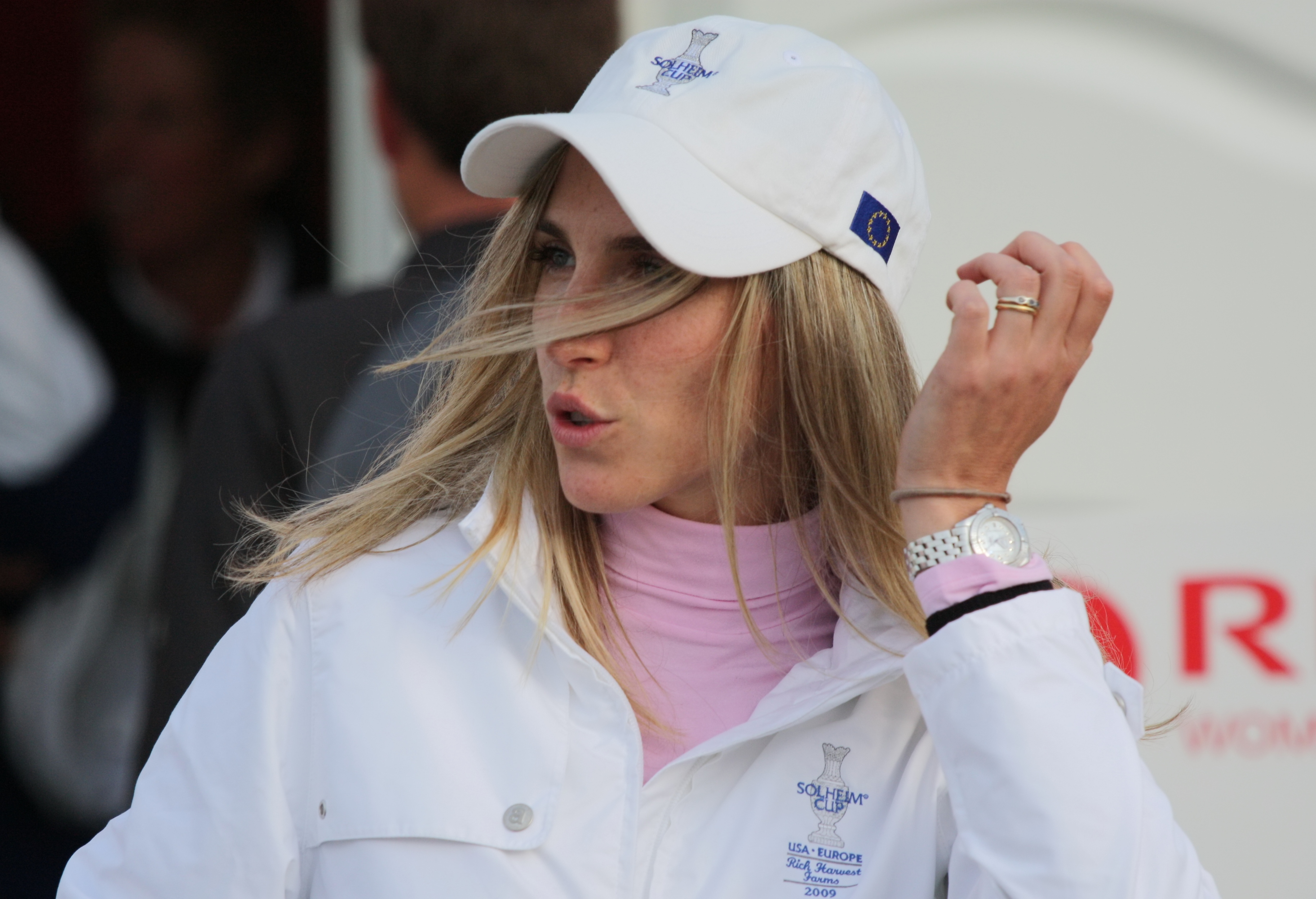
- Luna at the 2009 Women's British Open

Personal information
- Nationality: Italy
- Born: 3 September 1982 (age 44) Rome, Italy
- Height: 1.73 m (5 ft 8 in)
- Spouse: Orlandini del Beccuto

Career
- Sport: Golf
- Turned professional: 2001
- Former tour: Ladies European Tour
- Professional wins: 5

Number of wins by tour
- Ladies European Tour: 5

Best results in LPGA major championships
- Chevron Championship: T56: 2012
- Women's PGA C'ship: DNP
- U.S. Women's Open: T21: 2012
- Women's British Open: CUT: 2003–05, 2008–12
- Evian Championship: DNP
Medal record
Mediterranean Games
Bronze medal – third place	2001 Tunis	Women's team
Silver medal – second place	2018 Tarragona	Women's team

Diana Luna (born 3 September 1982) is a professional golfer from Italy.

== Career ==
Luna was born in Rome, Italy and turned professional in 2001. She won her first event on the Ladies European Tour in 2004 at the Tenerife Ladies Open, beating Becky Brewerton down the stretch.

After winless years in 2005-2008, Luna won two events back-to-back in the summer of 2009 for her second and third wins. Those two wins gave Luna a spot on the 2009 Solheim Cup European team.

Luna won the 2011 Unicredit Ladies German Open with a score of 264, 24-under-par. She played all four rounds without any bogies and create a new record for woman in golf history.

At the 2018 Mediterranean Games, Luna won a silver medal in the women's team competition.

Luna won the Ladies Italian PGAI Championship eleven times: 2002, 2004, 2006, 2011, 2012, 2013, 2014, 2015, 2016, 2019, 2021.

== Ladies European Tour wins (5) ==
- 2004 Tenerife Ladies Open
- 2009 AIB Ladies Irish Open, SAS Ladies Masters
- 2011 Unicredit Ladies German Open, Deutsche Bank Ladies Swiss Open

== Team appearances ==
Amateur

- European Ladies' Team Championship (representing Italy): 2001

Professional

- World Cup (representing Italy): 2005, 2008
- Solheim Cup (representing Europe): 2009
- European Championships (representing Italy): 2018
