= 2000 LPGA Tour =

Golf tour season

2000 LPGA Tour season
- Duration: January 13, 2000 – November 13, 2000
- Number of official events: 36
- Most wins: 7 (Australia) Karrie Webb
- Money leader: (Australia) Karrie Webb
- Rolex Player of the Year: (Australia) Karrie Webb
- Vare Trophy: (Australia) Karrie Webb
- Rookie of the Year: (United States) Dorothy Delasin

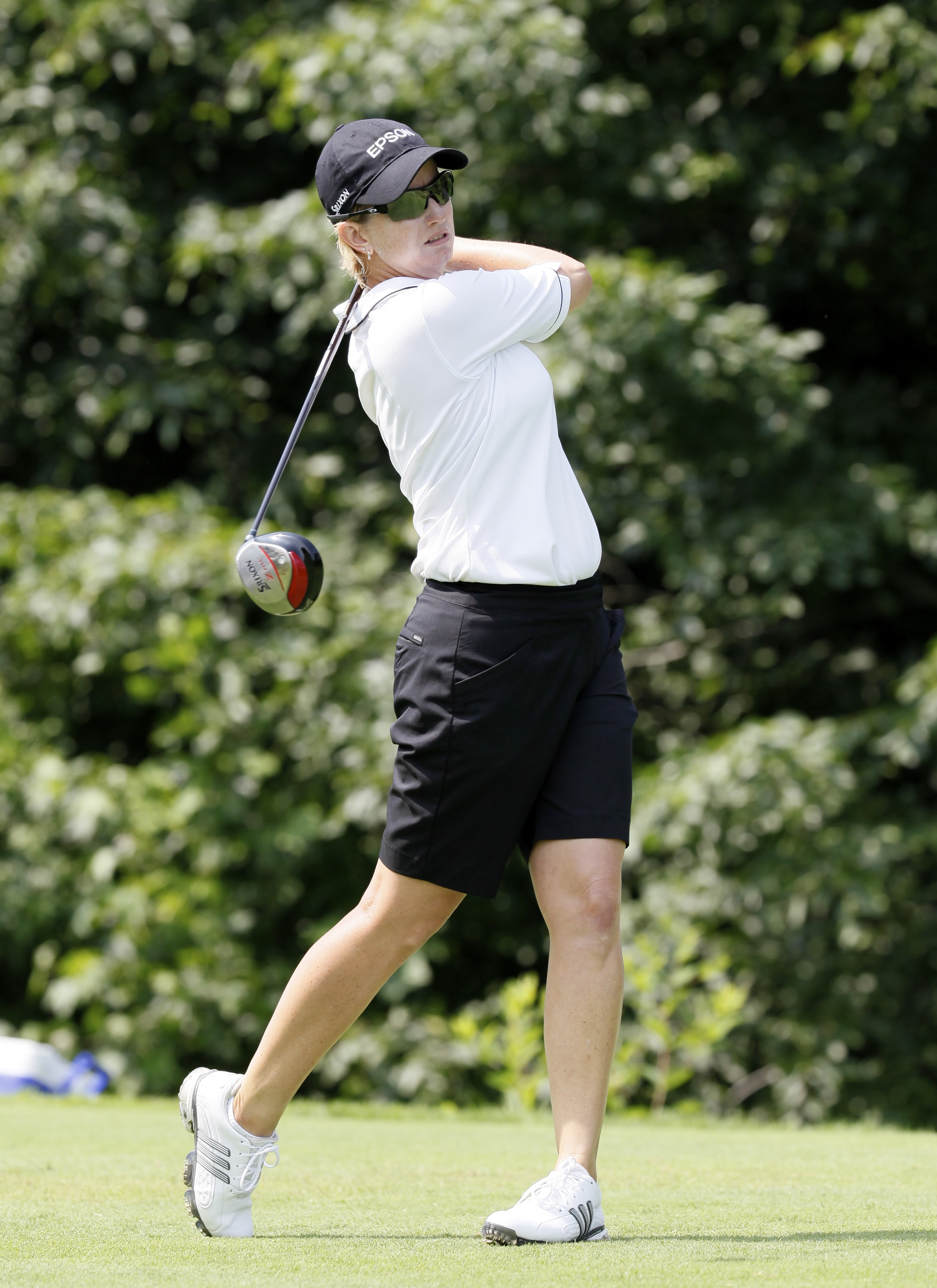
Karrie Webb (seen here in 2009) had the most tournament wins and earnings on the LPGA Tour in 2000.

The 2000 LPGA Tour was the 51st season since the LPGA Tour officially began in 1950. The season ran from January 13 to November 19. The season consisted of 36 official money events. Karrie Webb won the most tournaments, seven. She also led the money list with earnings of $1,876,853, breaking her own record for single-season earnings.

The U.S. Women's Open was the first tournament with a purse over $2,000,00 and a winner's share of $500,000. This was the last season that the du Maurier Classic (now known as the Canadian Women's Open) was considered an LPGA major. It was replaced as a major by the Women's British Open in 2001. There were seven first-time winners in 2000: Dorothy Delasin, Sophie Gustafson, Lorie Kane, Laurel Kean, Janice Moodie, Grace Park, and Charlotta Sörenstam.

The tournament results, leaders, and award winners are listed below.

== Tournament results ==
The following table shows all the official money events for the 2000 season. "Date" is the ending date of the tournament. The numbers in parentheses after the winners' names are the number of wins they had on the tour up to and including that event. Majors are shown in bold.

Date	Tournament	Location	Winner	Score	Purse ($)	1st prize ($)
Jan 16	The Office Depot	Florida	(Australia) Karrie Webb (17)	281 (−7)	750,000	112,500
Jan 23	Subaru Memorial of Naples	Florida	(United States) Nancy Scranton (3)	275 (−13)	850,000	127,500
Feb 13	Los Angeles Women's Championship	California	(England) Laura Davies (18)	211 (−5)	750,000	112,500
Feb 19	Cup Noodles Hawaiian Ladies Open	Hawaii	(United States) Betsy King (32)	204 (−12)	650,000	97,500
Feb 27	Australian Ladies Masters	Australia	(Australia) Karrie Webb (18)	274 (−14)	750,000	112,500
Mar 4	LPGA Takefuji Classic	Hawaii	(Australia) Karrie Webb (19)	207 (−9)	800,000	120,000
Mar 12	Welch's/Circle K Championship	Arizona	(Sweden) Annika Sörenstam (19)	269 (−19)	700,000	105,000
Mar 19	Standard Register PING	Arizona	(Sweden) Charlotta Sörenstam (1)	276 (−12)	850,000	127,500
Mar 26	**Nabisco Championship**	California	(Australia) **Karrie Webb (20)**	274 (−14)	1,250,000	187,500
Apr 16	Longs Drugs Challenge	California	(United States) Juli Inkster (23)	275 (−13)	700,000	105,000
Apr 30	Chick-fil-A Charity Championship	Georgia	(Sweden) Sophie Gustafson (1)	206 (−10)	900,000	135,000
May 7	The Philips Invitational	Texas	(England) Laura Davies (19)	275 (−5)	850,000	127,500
May 14	Electrolux USA Championship	Tennessee	(United States) Pat Hurst (3)	275 (−13)	800,000	120,000
May 21	Firstar LPGA Classic	Ohio	(Sweden) Annika Sörenstam (20)	197 (−19)	650,000	97,500
May 28	LPGA Corning Classic	New York	(United States) Betsy King (33)	276 (−12)	800,000	120,000
Jun 4	Kathy Ireland Greens.com LPGA Classic	South Carolina	(South Korea) Grace Park (1)	274 (−14)	750,000	112,500
Jun 11	Wegmans Rochester International	New York	(United States) Meg Mallon (12)	280 (−8)	1,000,000	150,000
Jun 17	Evian Masters	France	(Sweden) Annika Sörenstam (21)	276 (−12)	1,800,000	270,000
Jun 25	**McDonald's LPGA Championship**	Delaware	(United States) **Juli Inkster (24)**	281 (−3)	1,400,000	210,000
Jul 2	ShopRite LPGA Classic	New Jersey	(Scotland) Janice Moodie (1)	203 (−10)	1,100,000	165,000
Jul 9	Jamie Farr Kroger Classic	Ohio	(Sweden) Annika Sörenstam (22)	274 (−10)	1,000,000	150,000
Jul 16	Japan Airlines Big Apple Classic	New York	(Sweden) Annika Sörenstam (23)	206 (−7)	900,000	135,000
Jul 23	**U.S. Women's Open**	Illinois	(Australia) **Karrie Webb (21)**	282 (−6)	2,750,000	500,000
Jul 30	Giant Eagle LPGA Classic	Ohio	(United States) Dorothy Delasin (1)	205 (−11)	1,000,000	150,000
Aug 6	Michelob Light Classic	Missouri	(Canada) Lorie Kane (1)	205 (−11)	800,000	120,000
Aug 13	**du Maurier Classic**	Canada	(United States) **Meg Mallon (13)**	282 (−6)	1,200,000	180,000
Aug 20	Weetabix Women's British Open	England	(Sweden) Sophie Gustafson (2)	282 (−10)	1,250,000	178,000
Aug 27	Oldsmobile Classic	Michigan	(Australia) Karrie Webb (22)	265 (−23)	750,000	112,500
Sep 3	State Farm Rail Classic	Illinois	(United States) Laurel Kean (1)	198 (−18)	900,000	135,000
Sep 10	First Union Betsy King Classic	Pennsylvania	(United States) Michele Redman (2)	202 (−14)	800,000	120,000
Sep 24	Safeway LPGA Golf Championship	Oregon	(South Korea) Mi Hyun Kim (3)	215 (−1)	800,000	120,000
Oct 1	New Albany Golf Classic	Ohio	(Canada) Lorie Kane (2)	277 (−11)	1,000,000	150,000
Oct 15	Samsung World Championship	California	(United States) Juli Inkster (25)	274 (−14)	725,000	152,000
Oct 22	AFLAC Champions	Alabama	(Australia) Karrie Webb (23)	273 (−15)	750,000	122,000
Nov 5	Mizuno Classic	Japan	(Canada) Lorie Kane (3)	204 (−12)	850,000	127,500
Nov 19	Arch Wireless Championship	Florida	(United States) Dottie Pepper (17)	279 (−9)	1,000,000	215,000

== Leaders ==
Money List leaders

Rank	Player	Country	Earnings ($)	Events
1	Karrie Webb	Australia	1,876,853	22
2	Annika Sörenstam	Sweden	1,404,948	22
3	Meg Mallon	United States	1,146,360	26
4	Juli Inkster	United States	980,330	19
5	Lorie Kane	Canada	929,189	30
6	Pat Hurst	United States	840,161	26
7	Mi Hyun Kim	South Korea	825,720	27
8	Dottie Pepper	United States	786,695	19
9	Rosie Jones	United States	643,054	25
10	Michele Redman	United States	585,694	28

== Awards ==
Award	Winner	Country
Money winner	Karrie Webb (3)	Australia
Scoring leader (Vare Trophy)	Karrie Webb (3)	Australia
Player of the Year	Karrie Webb (2)	Australia
Rookie of the Year	Dorothy Delasin	United States
