= 2001 LPGA Championship =

Tournament information
- Dates: June 21–24, 2001
- Location: Wilmington, Delaware; 39.789°N 75.564°W
- Course: DuPont Country Club
- Tour: LPGA Tour
- Format: Stroke play - 72 holes

Statistics
- Par: 71
- Length: 6,408 yards (5,859 m)
- Field: 144 players, 73 after cut
- Cut: 145 (+3)
- Prize fund: $1.5 million
- Winner's share: $225,000

Champion
- (Australia) Karrie Webb
- 270 (−14)
- Location in United States Location in Delaware

The 2001 LPGA Championship was the 47th LPGA Championship, played June 21–24 at DuPont Country Club in Wilmington, Delaware. This was the third of four major championships on the LPGA Tour in 2001.

Karrie Webb won her only LPGA Championship, two strokes ahead of runner-up Laura Diaz, and completed the career grand slam. It was her second consecutive major win, as she also took the U.S. Women's Open earlier in the month.

Webb, age 26, became the fifth and youngest woman to win the career slam, passing Mickey Wright, who completed hers at age 27 in 1962. It was the fourth of Webb's seven major titles. With a 7-under 64 on Friday, she set the 36-hole scoring record at the LPGA Championship at 131 (−11).

The DuPont Country Club hosted this championship for eleven consecutive seasons, from 1994 through 2004.

== Final leaderboard ==
Sunday, June 24, 2001

Place	Player	Score	To par	Money ($)
1	(Australia) Karrie Webb	67-64-70-69=270	−14	225,000
2	(United States) Laura Diaz	67-71-66-68=272	−12	139,639
T3	(Sweden) Maria Hjorth	71-67-66-70=274	−10	90,577
T3	(United States) Wendy Ward	65-69-71-69=274	−10	90,577
5	(Sweden) Annika Sörenstam	68-69-71-67=275	−9	64,157
T6	(England) Laura Davies	67-68-70-71=276	−8	48,684
T6	(United States) Becky Iverson	66-73-67-70=276	−8	48,684
8	(South Korea) Mi Hyun Kim	70-70-68-69=277	−7	39,250
9	(Sweden) Helen Alfredsson	68-66-74-70=278	−6	35,476
T10	(United States) Michele Redman	69-66-73-71=279	−5	30,245
T10	(United States) Maggie Will	68-74-67-70=279	−5	30,245
