= 2006 in golf =

This article summarizes the highlights of professional and amateur golf in the year 2006.

== Men's professional golf ==
Major championships

- 6–9 April: The Masters - Winner: Phil Mickelson
  The Augusta National course was lengthened to 7,445 yards for the tournament, generating some advance controversy. For the first time since 1954 neither Jack Nicklaus nor Arnold Palmer played. Vijay Singh shot 67 to take the first-round lead, but on Day 2 Chad Campbell moved to six under and a three-shot lead. Due to bad weather the third round, wasn't completed until Sunday. After 54 holes Phil Mickelson led by one at 4 under and fifteen players were within four shots of the lead, including the top five in the world rankings (in ranking order Tiger Woods, Vijay Singh, Retief Goosen, Mickelson and Ernie Els). On Sunday Mickelson led for much of the day and finished two ahead of South African Tim Clark. It was Mickelson's third major championship, his second Masters title in three years and his second consecutive major victory as he also won the 2005 PGA Championship.
- 15–18 June: U.S. Open - Winner: Geoff Ogilvy
  15-year-old Tadd Fujikawa of Hawaii became the youngest qualifier in US Open history. Qualifier Madalitso Muthiya was the first Zambian to play in the U.S. Open. The tournament was played at Winged Foot for the first time since 1984. Scottish veteran Colin Montgomerie was the only man to shoot under par in round 1. After 36 holes Steve Stricker was one-shot ahead of the field and the only man under par. Tiger Woods missed the first cut in a major of his professional career after posting a 12 over par total. Phil Mickelson shared the third-round lead with the 27-year-old Englishman Kenneth Ferrie, who was playing in his first U.S. Open. Mickelson led by one shot after 71 holes, but was unable to put it away on number 72. His errant driving, which had troubled him all round, climaxed in a very poor tee shot that was almost out-of-bounds. This was followed by several bad shot selections, leading to a double bogey 6, and a second-place finish to winner Geoff Ogilvy. First-round leader Colin Montgomerie finished T2 when he, needing only a par at hole number 72 to win, double bogeyed. This was Montgomerie's fifth second-place finish in a major championship and his third at the U.S. Open.
- 20–23 July: The Open Championship - Winner: Tiger Woods
  The Open returned to Hoylake for the first time since 1967. Marius Thorp of Norway won the Silver Medal as leading amateur. Northern Ireland's Graeme McDowell took a one shot lead on the first day. On Day 2, Tiger Woods moved into the lead early in the day and remained at the top of the leaderboard at the close, one shot ahead of Ernie Els. During the third round the top of the field bunched up, with several leading players moving into contention, but Woods regained a one stroke lead at the end of the day, over Chris DiMarco, Sergio García, and Ernie Els. Woods shot a 67 in the final round to win by two shots over DiMarco at 270, 18-under par, only one shot short of his own to-par record for all majors. It was his third Open Championship, eleventh major, and he became the first man to pass $60 million in PGA Tour career earnings.
- 17–20 August: PGA Championship - Winner: Tiger Woods
  The tournament was played at Medinah Country Club near Chicago, which had been extended to 7,561 yards, making it the longest course in major championship history. The event was closely contested for three rounds, with a ten-way tie at one point early in round 3, but Tiger Woods pulled clear on the fourth day to win by five shots over Shaun Micheel. It was Woods' third PGA Championship win and his twelfth major championship title. Woods also became the first player ever to win the PGA twice on the same course, and the first in the era of the modern Grand Slam to win two major championships in each of two successive years.

World Golf Championships (individual events)

- 22–26 February: WGC-Accenture Match Play Championship - Australian World Number 53 Geoff Ogilvy defeated Davis Love III 3 and 2.
- 24–27 August: WGC-Bridgestone Invitational - Tiger Woods beat Stewart Cink on the fourth hole of a sudden death playoff.
- 28 September - 1 October: WGC-American Express Championship - Tiger Woods cruised to an 8 stroke victory to win his sixth straight strokeplay tournament and claim this championship for the fifth time in its seven stagings.

Other leading PGA Tour events

- 23–26 March: The Players Championship - Stephen Ames of Trinidad and Tobago / Canada won by a record-equaling six stroke margin over World Number 3 Retief Goosen, becoming the second-oldest champion in Championship history (tying Hal Sutton).
- 2–5 November: The Tour Championship - Twenty-six-year-old Adam Scott won this event for the first time in his career.

For a complete list of PGA Tour results see 2006 PGA Tour.

Other leading European Tour events

- 25–28 May: BMW Championship - Englishman David Howell won by five shots and moved into the top ten in the World Rankings for the first time.
- 14–17 September: HSBC World Match Play Championship - Englishman Paul Casey beat American Shaun Micheel by 10 and 8 in the most one sided final in the history of the tournament.
- 26–29 October: Volvo Masters - Jeev Milkha Singh becomes first Indian winner but attention is focused on Pádraig Harrington leapfrogging Paul Casey to win the Order of Merit, thanks to a missed putt on the final hole by Sergio García elevating Harrington to a tie for second place.

For a complete list of European Tour results, see 2006 European Tour.

Tour money list and order of merit winners

- PGA Tour - Tiger Woods topped the money list with winnings of $9,941,563, despite playing only 15 events due to the death of his father mid-year. This was his seventh money list victory, putting him one behind Jack Nicklaus's record. Final money list
- European Tour - Pádraig Harrington topped the Order of Merit for the first time, with earnings of €2,489,337 Final Order of Merit
- Japan Golf Tour - Shingo Katayama topped the money list for the third consecutive year with earnings of ¥178,402,190. Final money list
- Asian Tour - Jeev Milkha Singh topped the Order of Merit for the first time with earnings of US$591,884 Final order of merit
- PGA Tour of Australasia - Nick O'Hern topped the Order of Merit for the first time, with earnings of A$583,820 Final order of merit
- Sunshine Tour - Charl Schwartzel of South Africa topped the 2005-06 Order of Merit with earnings of R1,207,459.70, and led the rankings for a third consecutive season in 2006-07 with earnings of R1,585,117.41. Final 2006-07 Order of Merit.

Awards

- PGA Tour
  - Player of the Year (Jack Nicklaus Trophy) - Tiger Woods won for a record eighth time in ten full seasons on the PGA Tour
  - Money winner (Arnold Palmer Award) - Tiger Woods won for the seventh time
  - Vardon Trophy - Jim Furyk won for the first time with an adjusted scoring average of 68.86
  - Byron Nelson Award - Tiger Woods won for a record seventh time with an adjusted scoring average of 68.11
  - Rookie of the year - Trevor Immelman won the Western Open
  - Comeback Player of the Year - Steve Stricker posted seven top-10 finishes
- Champions Tour
  - Player of the Year - Jay Haas also topped the senior money list
  - Rookie of the Year - Eduardo Romero
  - Comeback Player of the Year - Tim Simpson
- Nationwide Tour
  - Player of the Year - Ken Duke
- European Tour
  - Player of the Year - Paul Casey
  - Rookie of the Year - Marc Warren

Team events

- 22–24 September: Ryder Cup - the Ryder Cup was played in Ireland for the first time. Europe were in the lead from the first set of matches. The Europeans went into the last day with a 10–6 lead and extended it to 18½ to 9½ in the singles, matching their best ever result in 2004. This was the first time Europe had won the matches three times in a row.
- 7–10 December: WGC-World Cup - The event was held in Barbados for the first time, and Germany, represented by Bernhard Langer and Marcel Siem, beat Scotland in a play-off to win the tournament for the second time.

Other tour results

- 2006 Asian Tour
- 2006 PGA Tour of Australasia
- 2006 Challenge Tour
- 2006 Nationwide Tour

Other happenings

- 11 January: The PGA Tour announced new six-year network deals with CBS and NBC to commence in 2007, and a fifteen-year deal with the Golf Channel.
- 26 May: Frenchman Adrien Mörk shot the first 59 in the history of any of the PGA European Tour's three tours in the second round of the Challenge Tour's Moroccan Classic.
- 28 June: The PGA Tour announced further details of the FedEx Cup playoff system to be introduced in 2007, including confirmation that there will be a US$35 million-dollar bonus prize fund, with US$10 million going to the winner.
- 29 October: Jeev Milkha Singh (Volvo Masters) and K. J. Choi (Chrysler Championship) became the first pair of Asian players to win on the PGA Tour and the European Tour in the same weekend.

== Women's professional golf ==
LPGA majors

- 30 March - 2 April: Kraft Nabisco Championship: Australia's Karrie Webb defeated 18, 36 and 54 hole leader Lorena Ochoa in a playoff to claim her seventh major championship. Ochoa shot a 62 in the first round, setting a tournament record and equaling the record low score in an LPGA major.
- 8–11 June: LPGA Championship - Se Ri Pak defeated Karrie Webb in a playoff to claim her third LPGA Championship and fifth major title. Nicole Castrale shot a 64 in the first round to set a tournament record.
- 29 June - 2 July: U.S. Women's Opened - The tournament was played at Newport Country Club. The prize fund was US$3.1 million, a record for a women's golf tournament, with $560,000 going to the winner. The first day's play was canceled due to fog and 36 holes were played on the Sunday. Annika Sörenstam and Pat Hurst tied on level par after 72 holes. Sörenstam won an eighteen-hole playoff Monday to claim her tenth major championship and third U.S. Open.
- 3–6 August: Weetabix Women's British Open - The tournament was played at Royal Lytham & St. Annes for the third time in its history. American Sherri Steinhauer took the lead after a third round 66 and held the lead in the final round for a three-stroke win over runners-up Cristie Kerr and Sophie Gustafson. It was Steinhauer's third British Open win, but her first since the tournament became a major in 2001.

Ladies European Tour major (in addition to the Women's British Open)

- 26–29 July: Evian Masters - Karrie Webb continued her return to form by winning the second-richest event in women's golf.

For a complete list of Ladies European Tour results, see 2006 Ladies European Tour.

Additional LPGA Tour events

- 6–9 July: HSBC Women's World Match Play Championship - 20-year-old American Brittany Lincicome beat veteran Juli Inkster 3 & 2 to claim her first LPGA Tour title.
- 16–19 November: LPGA Playoffs at The ADT - Julieta Granada from Paraguay claimed her first tour victory and the first US$1 million prize in women's golf.

For a complete list of LPGA Tour results see 2006 LPGA Tour.

Money list winners

- LPGA Tour - 25-year-old Lorena Ochoa became the first Mexican to top the money list with earnings of $2,592,872. Current money list
- Ladies European Tour - Laura Davies of England topped the money list of the seventh time in her career with earnings of €471,727.42. Final money list.

Team events

- 20–22 January: Women's World Cup - Sweden's Annika Sörenstam and Liselotte Neumann claimed the trophy in its second year.
- 15–17 December: 2006 Lexus Cup - Asia captained by South Korea's Grace Park defeated the International team captained by Sweden's Annika Sörenstam 12.5 to 11.5.

Other happenings

- 21 February: the first official Women's World Golf Rankings were published. Annika Sörenstam was ranked number 1.
- 4–7 May: Michelle Wie made the cut at the SK Telecom Open on the Asian Tour. This was the highest ranking men's tour on which a woman has made a cut since Babe Zaharias did so on the PGA Tour in 1945.
- 15–18 June: The first ever Futures Tour major event was played, the Michelob ULTRA Duramed FUTURES Players Championship. Canadian Salimah Mussani won with a 16-under par 272.
- 14 September: Annika Sörenstam became the first woman to pass $20 million in LPGA Tour career earnings.
- 12 November: With her victory at The Mitchell Company Tournament of Champions, Lorena Ochoa claimed the LPGA Rolex Player of the Year award.

== Senior men's professional golf ==
Senior majors

- 25–28 May: Senior PGA Championship - Jay Haas won a playoff against Brad Bryant to claim his first senior major.
- 6–9 July: U.S. Senior Open - Defending champion Allen Doyle finished two shots ahead of Tom Watson. It was Doyle's fourth senior major and he was the oldest U.S. Senior Open Champion at 57 years, 348 days.
- 13–16 July: Senior Players Championship - Bobby Wadkins won his first senior major
- 27–30 July: Senior British Open - Loren Roberts defeated Eduardo Romero at the first hole of a playoff to claim his first senior major.
- 24–27 August: The Tradition - Argentinian Eduardo Romero defeated Lonnie Nielsen in a playoff for his first Champions Tour title.

For a complete list of Champions Tour results see 2006 Champions Tour.
For a complete list of European Seniors Tour results see 2006 European Seniors Tour.

Money list winners

- Champions Tour - Jay Haas topped the money list for the first time with earnings of US$2,420,227 - Final money list
- European Seniors Tour - Sam Torrance topped the Order of Merit for the second consecutive year with earnings of €347,525 Final Order of Merit list

== Amateur golf ==
- May 31 - June 3: NCAA Division I Men's Golf Championships - Oklahoma State won the team event and Jonathan Moore of Oklahoma State was the leading individual
- 19–24 June: The Amateur Championship was won by 20-year-old Frenchman Julien Guerrier.
- 29–30 July: Curtis Cup - the USA defeated Great Britain & Ireland by 11.5 points to 6.5 points.
- 7–13 August: U.S. Women's Amateur - 14-year-old American Kimberly Kim of Hawaii became the youngest winner in the history of the event.
- 23–27 August: U.S. Amateur - Richie Ramsay became the first Scottish winner since Findlay Douglas in 1898 and the first British winner since Harold Hilton in 1911.
- 18–21 October: Espirito Santo Trophy (Women's Amateur World Team Championship) - South Africa won the tournament for the first time. They were the first home winners since 1980.
- 26–29 October: Eisenhower Trophy (Men's Amateur World Team Championship) - the Netherlands won for the first time.

== Table of results ==
This table summarises all the results referred to above in date order.

Dates	Tournament	Status or tour	Winner
20-22 Jan	Women's World Cup of Golf	Professional world team championship	Sweden
22-26 Feb	WGC-Accenture Match Play Championship	World Golf Championships	(Australia) Geoff Ogilvy
23-26 Mar	The Players Championship	PGA Tour	(Trinidad and Tobago) (Canada) Stephen Ames
30 Mar-2 Apr	Kraft Nabisco Championship	LPGA major	(Australia) Karrie Webb
6-9 Apr	The Masters	Men's major	(United States) Phil Mickelson
25–28 May	BMW Championship	European Tour	(England) David Howell
25–28 May	Senior PGA Championship	Senior major	(United States) Jay Haas
31 May-3 Jun	NCAA Division I Men's Golf Championships	U.S. college championship	Oklahoma State / Jonathan Moore
8-11 Jun	LPGA Championship	LPGA major	(South Korea) Se Ri Pak
15-18 Jun	U.S. Open	Men's major	(Australia) Geoff Ogilvy
19-24 Jun	The Amateur Championship	Amateur men's individual tournament	(France) Julien Guerrier
29 Jun-2 Jul	U.S. Women's Open	LPGA major	(Sweden) Annika Sörenstam
6-9 Jul	HSBC Women's World Match Play Championship	LPGA Tour	(United States) Brittany Lincicome
6-9 Jul	U.S. Senior Open	Senior major	(United States) Allen Doyle
13-16 Jul	Senior Players Championship	Senior major	(United States) Bobby Wadkins
20-23 Jul	The Open Championship	Men's major	(United States) Tiger Woods
26-29 Jul	Evian Masters	Ladies European Tour major and LPGA Tour regular event	(Australia) Karrie Webb
27-30 Jul	Senior British Open	Senior major	(United States) Loren Roberts
29-30 Jul	Curtis Cup	GB & Ireland v United States - women's amateur	United States
3-6 Aug	Women's British Open	LPGA and Ladies European Tour major	(United States) Sherri Steinhauer
7-13 Aug	U.S. Women's Amateur	Amateur women's individual tournament	(United States) Kimberly Kim
17-20 Aug	PGA Championship	Men's major	(United States) Tiger Woods
24-27 Aug	WGC-Bridgestone Invitational	World Golf Championships	(United States) Tiger Woods
23-27 Aug	U.S. Amateur	Amateur men's individual tournament	(Scotland) Richie Ramsay
24-27 Aug	The Tradition	Senior major	(Argentina) Eduardo Romero
14-17 Sep	HSBC World Match Play Championship	European Tour	(England) Paul Casey
22-24 Sep	Ryder Cup	Europe v United States — men's professional	(European Union) Team Europe
28 Sep-1 Oct	WGC-American Express Championship	World Golf Championships	(United States) Tiger Woods
18-21 Oct	Espirito Santo Trophy	Women's world amateur team championship	South Africa
26-29 Oct	Eisenhower Trophy	Men's world amateur team championship	Netherlands
26-29 Oct	Volvo Masters	European Tour	(India) Jeev Milkha Singh
2-5 Nov	The Tour Championship	PGA Tour	(Australia) Adam Scott
16-19 Nov	LPGA Playoffs at The ADT	LPGA Tour	(Paraguay) Julieta Granada
7-10 Dec	WGC-World Cup	World Golf Championships	Germany
15-17 Dec	Lexus Cup	Asia vs. International — women's professional	Asia

The following biennial events will next be played in 2007: Presidents Cup; Seve Trophy; Solheim Cup; Walker Cup.

== Miscellaneous ==
The first golf drive in space was made on 22 November 2006 funded by Canadian golf company Element 21 as part of the Expedition 14.
