= 2001 U.S. Women's Open =

Coordinates: 35.197°N 79.392°W

Tournament information
- Dates: May 31 – June 3, 2001
- Location: Southern Pines, North Carolina
- Course: Pine Needles Lodge and Golf Club
- Organized by: USGA
- Tour: LPGA Tour

Statistics
- Par: 70
- Length: 6,256 yards (5,720 m)
- Field: 150 players, 60 after cut
- Cut: 146 (+6)
- Prize fund: $2.9 million
- Winner's share: $520,000

Champion
- (Australia) Karrie Webb
- 273 (−7)

Location in the United States
Location in North Carolina

The 2001 U.S. Women's Open was the 56th U.S. Women's Open, held May 31 to June 3 at Pine Needles Lodge and Golf Club in Southern Pines, North Carolina. This was the second of four major championships on the LPGA Tour in 2001.

Defending champion Karrie Webb repeated as champion, eight strokes ahead of runner-up Se Ri Pak, the largest margin in 21 years. Webb became the seventh to win consecutive titles at the U.S. Women's Open, and the win was the fifth of her seven major titles.

Pine Needles previously hosted the championship in 1996 and it returned in 2007.

== Course layout ==
Pine Needles Lodge and Golf Club

Hole	1	2	3	4	5	6	7	8	9	Out	10	11	12	13	14	15	16	17	18	In	Total
Yards	481	413	134	360	175	393	401	327	376	3,060	451	367	351	200	401	409	177	429	411	3,196	6,256
Par	5	4	3	4	3	4	4	4	4	35	5	4	4	3	4	4	3	4	4	35	70

== Round summaries ==
=== First round ===
Thursday, May 31, 2001

Place	Player	Score	To par
T1	(Canada) A.J. Eathorne	67	−3
T1	(United States) Cindy Figg-Currier	67	−3
T3	(United States) Juli Inkster	68	−2
T3	(South Korea) Mi-Hyun Kim	68	−2
T3	(United States) Jill McGill	68	−2
T6	(United States) Danielle Ammaccapane	69	−1
T6	(United States) Stephanie Kerr (a)	69	−1
T6	(United States) Cristie Kerr	69	−1
T6	(South Korea) Se Ri Pak	69	−1
T10	(United States) Jean Bartholomew	70	E
T10	(United States) Audra Burks	70	E
T10	(Sweden) Maria Hjorth	70	E
T10	(United States) Kelli Kuehne	70	E
T10	(United States) Terry-Jo Myers	70	E
T10	(Japan) Aki Nakano	70	E
T10	(Sweden) Liselotte Neumann	70	E
T10	(Sweden) Catrin Nilsmark	70	E
T10	(United States) Michele Redman	70	E
T10	(United States) Pearl Sinn	70	E
T10	(Sweden) Annika Sörenstam	70	E
T10	(United States) Sherri Steinhauer	70	E
T10	(United States) Wendy Ward	70	E
T10	(Australia) Karrie Webb	70	E

=== Second round ===
Friday, June 1, 2001
Saturday, June 2, 2001

Place	Player	Score	To par
1	(Australia) Karrie Webb	70-65=135	−5
2	(Canada) A.J. Eathorne	67-71=138	−2
3	(South Korea) Se Ri Pak	69-70=139	−1
T4	(United States) Kristi Albers	71-69=140	E
T4	(Sweden) Sophie Gustafson	74-66=140	E
T4	(United States) Juli Inkster	68-72=140	E
T4	(Scotland) Catriona Matthew	72-68=140	E
T8	(Australia) Wendy Doolan	71-70=141	+1
T8	(Japan) Yuri Fudoh	73-68=141	+1
T8	(United States) Kelli Kuehne	70-71=141	+1
T8	(Scotland) Janice Moodie	71-70=141	+1
T8	(United States) Wendy Ward	70-71=141	+1

=== Third round ===
Saturday, June 2, 2001

Place	Player	Score	To par
1	(Australia) Karrie Webb	70-65-69=204	−6
2	(South Korea) Se Ri Pak	69-70-70=209	−1
3	(Scotland) Catriona Matthew	72-68-70=210	E
T4	(Australia) Wendy Doolan	71-70-70=211	+1
T4	(Japan) Yuri Fudoh	73-68-70=211	+1
T4	(United States) Juli Inkster	68-72-71=211	+1
T7	(Canada) A.J. Eathorne	67-71-75=213	+3
T7	(United States) Cristie Kerr	69-73-71=213	+3
T7	(United States) Kelli Kuehne	70-71-72=213	+3
T7	(United States) Dottie Pepper	74-69-70=213	+3
T7	(United States) Sherri Turner	72-70-71=213	+3

=== Final round ===
Sunday, June 3, 2001

Place	Player	Score	To par	Money ($)
1	(Australia) Karrie Webb	70-65-69-69=273	−7	520,000
2	(South Korea) Se Ri Pak	69-70-70-72=281	+1	310,000
3	(United States) Dottie Pepper	74-69-70-69=282	+2	202,580
T4	(Scotland) Catriona Matthew	72-68-70-73=283	+3	118,697
T4	(United States) Cristie Kerr	69-73-71-70=283	+3	118,697
T4	(United States) Sherri Turner	72-70-71-70=283	+3	118,697
T7	(United States) Kelli Kuehne	70-71-72-71=284	+4	80,726
T7	(United States) Kristi Albers	71-69-74-70=284	+4	80,726
T7	(Canada) Lorie Kane	75-68-72-69=284	+4	80,726
T7	(Australia) Wendy Doolan	71-70-70-73=284	+4	80,726
