= 2001 LPGA Tour =

Golf tour season

2001 LPGA Tour season
- Duration: January 12, 2001 – November 18, 2001
- Number of official events: 38
- Most wins: 8 (Sweden) Annika Sörenstam
- Money leader: (Sweden) Annika Sörenstam
- Rolex Player of the Year: (Sweden) Annika Sörenstam
- Vare Trophy: (Sweden) Annika Sörenstam
- Rookie of the Year: (South Korea) Han Hee-won

The 2001 LPGA Tour was the 52nd season since the LPGA Tour officially began in 1950. The season ran from January 12 to November 18. The season consisted of 38 official money events. Annika Sörenstam won the most tournaments, eight. She also led the money list with earnings of $2,105,868, becoming the first to top $2 million in a single season. Her scoring average of 69.42 also set an LPGA Tour record.

This was the first season that the Women's British Open was considered an LPGA major. There were seven first-time winners in 2001: Heather Daly-Donofrio, Wendy Doolan, Tina Fischer, Kate Golden, Carin Koch, Catriona Matthew, and Gloria Park.

The tournament results, leaders, and award winners are listed below.

== Tournament results ==
The following table shows all the official money events for the 2001 season. "Date" is the ending date of the tournament. The numbers in parentheses after the winners' names are the number of wins they had on the tour up to and including that event. Majors are shown in bold.

Date	Tournament	Location	Winner	Score	Purse ($)	1st prize ($)
Jan 14	YourLife Vitamins LPGA Classic	Florida	(South Korea) Se Ri Pak (9)	203 (−13)	1,000,000	150,000
Jan 21	Subaru Memorial of Naples	Florida	(Sweden) Sophie Gustafson (3)	272 (−16)	1,000,000	150,000
Jan 28	The Office Depot	Florida	(South Korea) Grace Park (2)	280 (−6)	825,000	123,750
Feb 10	LPGA Takefuji Classic	Hawaii	(Canada) Lorie Kane (4)	205 (−11)	850,000	127,500
Feb 17	Cup Noodles Hawaiian Ladies Open	Hawaii	(Scotland) Catriona Matthew (1)	210 (−6)	750,000	112,500
Mar 11	Welch's/Circle K Championship	Arizona	(Sweden) Annika Sörenstam (24)	265 (−23)	750,000	112,500
Mar 18	Standard Register PING	Arizona	(Sweden) Annika Sörenstam (25)	261 (−27)	1,000,000	150,000
Mar 25	**Nabisco Championship**	California	(Sweden) **Annika Sörenstam (26)**	281 (−7)	1,500,000	225,000
Apr 14	The Office Depot	California	(Sweden) Annika Sörenstam (27)	210 (−6)	800,000	120,000
Apr 22	Longs Drugs Challenge	California	(South Korea) Se Ri Pak (10)	208 (−8)	800,000	120,000
Apr 29	Kathy Ireland Championship	Texas	(United States) Rosie Jones (11)	268 (−12)	900,000	135,000
May 6	Chick-fil-A Charity Championship	Georgia	(Sweden) Annika Sörenstam (28)	203 (−13)	1,200,000	180,000
May 13	Electrolux USA Championship	Tennessee	(United States) Juli Inkster (26)	274 (−14)	800,000	120,000
May 20	LPGA Champions Classic	Ohio	(Australia) Wendy Doolan (1)	132 (−12)^	750,000	112,500
May 27	LPGA Corning Classic	New York	(Sweden) Carin Koch (1)	270 (−18)	900,000	135,000
Jun 3	**U.S. Women's Open**	North Carolina	(Australia) **Karrie Webb (24)**	273 (−7)	2,900,000	520,000
Jun 10	Wegmans Rochester International	New York	(England) Laura Davies (20)	279 (−9)	1,000,000	150,000
Jun 16	Evian Masters	France	(Australia) Rachel Teske (4)	273 (−15)	2,100,000	315,000
Jun 24	**McDonald's LPGA Championship**	Delaware	(Australia) **Karrie Webb (25)**	270 (−14)	1,500,000	225,000
Jul 1	ShopRite LPGA Classic	New Jersey	(United States) Betsy King (34)	201 (−12)	1,200,000	180,000
Jul 8	Jamie Farr Kroger Classic	Ohio	(South Korea) Se Ri Pak (11)	269 (−15)	1,000,000	150,000
Jul 15	Michelob Light Classic	Missouri	(United States) Emilee Klein (3)	205 (−11)	800,000	120,000
Jul 22	Sybase Big Apple Classic	New York	(United States) Rosie Jones (12)	272 (−12)	950,000	142,500
Jul 29	Giant Eagle LPGA Classic	Ohio	(United States) Dorothy Delasin (2)	203 (−13)	1,000,000	150,000
Aug 5	**Weetabix Women's British Open**	England	(South Korea) **Se Ri Pak (12)**	277 (−11)	1,500,000	221,650
Aug 12	Wendy's Championship for Children	Ohio	(United States) Wendy Ward (3)	195 (−21)	1,000,000	150,000
Aug 19	Bank of Montreal Canadian Women's Open	Canada	(Sweden) Annika Sörenstam (29)	272 (−16)	1,200,000	180,000
Aug 26	First Union Betsy King Classic	Pennsylvania	(United States) Heather Daly-Donofrio (1)	273 (−15)	800,000	120,000
Sep 2	State Farm Classic	Illinois	(United States) Kate Golden (1)	267 (−21)	1,000,000	150,000
Sep 9	Williams Championship	Oklahoma	(South Korea) Gloria Park (1)	201 (−9)	1,000,000	150,000
Sep 16	Safeway Classic	Oregon	Tournament canceled due to the September 11 attacks		1,000,000	
Sep 23	Asahi Ryokuken International Championship	South Carolina	(Germany) Tina Fischer (1)	206 (−10)	1,200,000	180,000
Sep 30	AFLAC Champions	Alabama	(South Korea) Se Ri Pak (13)	272 (−16)	750,000	122,000
Oct 7	Samsung World Championship	California	(United States) Dorothy Delasin (3)	277 (−11)	750,000	157,000
Oct 21	Sports Today CJ Nine Bridges Classic	South Korea	Tournament canceled due to the September 11 attacks		1,500,000	
Oct 28	Cisco World Ladies Match Play Championship	Japan	(Sweden) Annika Sörenstam (30)	1 up	960,000	144,000
Nov 4	Mizuno Classic	Japan	(Sweden) Annika Sörenstam (31)	203 (−13)	1,080,000	162,000
Nov 18	Tyco/ADT Championship	Florida	(Australia) Karrie Webb (26)	279 (−9)	1,000,000	215,000

^ – weather-shortened tournament

== Leaders ==
Money List leaders

Rank	Player	Country	Earnings ($)	Events
1	Annika Sörenstam	Sweden	2,105,868	26
2	Se Ri Pak	South Korea	1,623,009	21
3	Karrie Webb	Australia	1,535,404	22
4	Lorie Kane	Canada	947,489	27
5	Maria Hjorth	Sweden	848,195	29
6	Rosie Jones	United States	785,010	23
7	Dottie Pepper	United States	776,482	23
8	Mi Hyun Kim	South Korea	762,363	29
9	Laura Diaz	United States	751,466	27
10	Catriona Matthew	Scotland	747,970	29

== Awards ==
Award	Winner	Country
Money winner	Annika Sörenstam (4)	Sweden
Scoring leader (Vare Trophy)	Annika Sörenstam (4)	Sweden
Player of the Year	Annika Sörenstam (4)	Sweden
Rookie of the Year	Hee-Won Han	South Korea
