= 2006 Kraft Nabisco Championship =

Coordinates: 33.798°N 116.433°W

Tournament information
- Dates: March 30 – April 2, 2006
- Location: Rancho Mirage, California
- Courses: Mission Hills Country Club; Dinah Shore Tourn. Course
- Tour: LPGA Tour
- Format: Stroke play - 72 holes

Statistics
- Par: 72
- Length: 6,569 yards (6,007 m)
- Field: 100 players, 70 after cut
- Cut: 150 (+6)
- Prize fund: $1.8 million
- Winner's share: $270,000

Champion
- (Australia) Karrie Webb
- 279 (−9), playoff

Location in the United States
Location in California

The 2006 Kraft Nabisco Championship was a women's professional golf tournament, held March 30 to April 2 at Mission Hills Country Club in Rancho Mirage, California. It was the 35th edition of the Kraft Nabisco Championship, and the 24th as a major championship. The purse was $1.8 million, with a winner's share of $270,000.

In a sudden-death playoff, 2000 champion Karrie Webb defeated Lorena Ochoa with a birdie on the first extra hole, the par-5 18th. Webb had earlier holed out for an eagle on the same hole to card a 65 (−7) in the final round to force the playoff. Ochoa recorded a 62 (−10) in the first round, but was one over-par for the final 54 holes; she also eagled the 72nd hole. One stroke out of the playoff were Natalie Gulbis and Michelle Wie, then age 16.

It was Webb's second win at this event and her seventh major title, the first in nearly four years, since the Women's British Open in 2002. Through 2016, it is her most recent victory in a major.

== Round summaries ==
=== First round ===
Thursday, March 30, 2006

Place	Player	Score	To par
1	(Mexico) Lorena Ochoa	62	−10
2	(United States) Michelle Wie	66	−6
3	(United States) Stacy Prammanasudh	67	−5
4	(Brazil) Angela Park (a)	68	−4
T5	(United States) Paula Creamer	69	−3
T5	(United States) Juli Inkster	69	−3
T5	(South Korea) Seon Hwa Lee	69	−3
T5	(United States) Morgan Pressel	69	−3
T5	(England) Karen Stupples	69	−3
T10	(Sweden) Helen Alfredsson	70	−2
T10	(South Korea) Shi Hyun Ahn	70	−2
T10	(Sweden) Carin Koch	70	−2
T10	(United States) Brittany Lang	70	−2
T10	(Japan) Ai Miyazato	70	−2
T10	(England) Johanna Mundy	70	−2
T10	(Australia) Karrie Webb	70	−2

=== Second round ===
Friday, March 31, 2006

Place	Player	Score	To par
1	(Mexico) Lorena Ochoa	62-71=133	−11
2	(United States) Michelle Wie	66-71=137	−7
T3	(South Korea) Seon Hwa Lee	69-69=138	−6
T3	(Australia) Karrie Webb	70-68=138	−6
T5	(United States) Paula Creamer	69-71=140	−4
T5	(United States) Stacy Prammanasudh	67-73=140	−4
T7	(South Korea) Shi Hyun Ahn	70-71=141	−3
T7	(Brazil) Angela Park (a)	68-73=141	−3
T9	(Sweden) Helen Alfredsson	70-72=142	−2
T9	(United States) Juli Inkster	69-73=142	−2
T9	(Sweden) Carin Koch	70-72=142	−2

Amateurs: A. Park (−3), Martinez (+3), Michaels (+6), I. Park (+6).

=== Third round ===
Saturday, April 1, 2006

Place	Player	Score	To par
1	(Mexico) Lorena Ochoa	62-71-74=207	−9
2	(United States) Michelle Wie	66-71-73=210	−6
T3	(South Korea) Shi Hyun Ahn	70-71-71=212	−4
T3	(United States) Natalie Gulbis	73-71-68=212	−4
T3	(South Korea) Seon Hwa Lee	69-69-74=212	−4
T6	(Sweden) Helen Alfredsson	70-72-72=214	−2
T6	(Australia) Karrie Webb	70-68-76=214	−2
T8	(South Korea) Hee-Won Han	75-72-68=215	−1
T8	(United States) Morgan Pressel	69-76-70=215	−1
T8	(England) Karen Stupples	69-74-72=215	−1

=== Final round ===
Sunday, April 2, 2006

Place	Player	Score	To par	Money ($)
T1	(Australia) Karrie Webb	70-68-76-65=279	−9	Playoff
T1	(Mexico) Lorena Ochoa	62-71-74-72=279	−9	Playoff
T3	(United States) Natalie Gulbis	73-71-68-68=280	−8	108,222
T3	(United States) Michelle Wie	66-71-73-70=280	−8	108,222
5	(United States) Juli Inkster	69-73-74-68=284	−4	75,985
T6	(South Korea) Hee-Won Han	75-72-68-71=286	−2	57,104
T6	(Sweden) Annika Sörenstam	71-72-73-70=286	−2	57,104
T8	(South Korea) Shi Hyun Ahn	70-71-71-75=287	−1	41,293
T8	(Sweden) Helen Alfredsson	70-72-72-73=287	−1	41,293
T8	(United States) Brittany Lang	70-74-72-71=287	−1	41,293

Amateurs: A. Park (+2), Martinez (+16), I. Park (+16), Michaels (+20)

==== Scorecard ====
Final round

Hole	1	2	3	4	5	6	7	8	9	10	11	12	13	14	15	16	17	18
Par	4	5	4	4	3	4	4	3	5	4	5	4	4	3	4	4	3	5
(Australia) Webb	−2	−2	−3	−3	−4	−4	−5	−5	−5	−6	−7	−7	−7	−7	−7	−7	−7	−9
(Mexico) Ochoa	−9	−10	−10	−10	−10	−10	−10	−10	−9	−9	−9	−8	−7	−7	−6	−7	−7	−9
(United States) Gulbis	−3	−4	−4	−4	−4	−5	−5	−5	−5	−5	−5	−5	−6	−6	−7	−7	−8	−8
(United States) Wie	−7	−8	−8	−8	−8	−7	−8	−8	−9	−9	−9	−8	−8	−7	−7	−8	−8	−8
(United States) Inkster	E	−1	−2	−2	−2	−2	−2	−2	−3	−2	−3	−3	−4	−3	−4	−4	−4	−4
(South Korea) Han	−1	−2	−2	−2	−2	−2	−3	−3	−2	−2	−2	−2	−2	−2	−2	−2	−2	−2
(Sweden) Sörenstam	E	E	+1	+1	E	E	E	−1	−1	−1	−2	−3	−2	−2	−3	−2	−2	−2

Cumulative tournament scores, relative to par

Eagle	Birdie	Bogey

==== Playoff ====
The sudden-death playoff began on the par-5 18th hole; Webb birdied to win the title.

Place	Player	Score	To par	Money ($)
1	(Australia) Karrie Webb	4	−1	270,000
2	(Mexico) Lorena Ochoa	5	E	168,226
