= 1999 du Maurier Classic =

Coordinates: 50°53′43″N 114°24′10″W

The 1999 du Maurier Classic was contested from July 29 to August 1 at Priddis Greens Golf & Country Club, near Calgary, Alberta, Canada. It was the 27th edition of the du Maurier Classic, and the 21st edition as a major championship on the LPGA Tour.

This event was won by Karrie Webb.

== Final leaderboard ==
| Place | Player | Score | To par | Money (US$) |
|---|---|---|---|---|
| 1 | (Australia) Karrie Webb | 73-72-66-66=277 | −11 | 180,000 |
| 2 | (England) Laura Davies | 72-66-69-72=279 | −9 | 111,711 |
| 3 | (United States) Juli Inkster | 68-69-74-69=280 | −8 | 81,519 |
| 4 | (Canada) Dawn Coe-Jones | 72-65-72-74=283 | −5 | 63,404 |
| 5 | (Scotland) Catriona Matthew | 68-70-72-74=284 | −4 | 51,326 |
| T6 | (Canada) Lorie Kane | 70-72-73-70=285 | −3 | 36,431 |
| T6 | (South Korea) Mi-Hyun Kim | 78-69-69-69=285 | −3 | 36,431 |
| T6 | (United States) Maggie Will | 74-69-74-68=285 | −3 | 36,431 |
| T9 | (United States) Rosie Jones | 67-74-72-73=286 | −2 | 24,486 |
| T9 | (Sweden) Carin Koch | 71-71-73-71=286 | −2 | 24,486 |
| T9 | (United States) Jill McGill | 72-71-71-72=286 | −2 | 24,486 |
| T9 | (United States) Sherri Turner | 72-72-70-72=286 | −2 | 24,486 |
