= 2006 LPGA Tour =

Golf tour season

2006 LPGA Tour season
- Duration: January 20, 2006 – December 24, 2006
- Number of official events: 33
- Most wins: 6 (Mexico) Lorena Ochoa
- Money leader: (Mexico) Lorena Ochoa
- Rolex Player of the Year: (Mexico) Lorena Ochoa
- Vare Trophy: (Mexico) Lorena Ochoa
- Rookie of the Year: (South Korea) Lee Seon-hwa

The 2006 LPGA Tour was a series of weekly golf tournaments for elite female golfers from around the world, which took place from February through December 2006. The tournaments were sanctioned by the United States–based Ladies Professional Golf Association (LPGA). In 2006, prize money on the LPGA Tour exceeded US$50 million for the first time in the history of the LPGA Tour.

Lorena Ochoa became the first Mexican to top the money list on the LPGA Tour, or any major international golf tour, while Annika Sörenstam held her position as the top ranked player through the whole season. Multi-time major champions Karrie Webb and Se Ri Pak had comeback seasons after fallow periods, each claiming a major championship.

2006 saw a growth in the international presence on the Tour. Of the 33 events, only seven were won by Americans, with Cristie Kerr the only American to win more than once (three times). By contrast, Mexican Lorena Ochoa won six events, Australian Karrie Webb five, Swede Annika Sörenstam three, and nine different South Koreans combined to win 11 events. The season-ending LPGA Playoffs at The ADT was won by Paraguayan Julieta Granada. The other seven finalists in that event featured only two Americans (Paula Creamer and Natalie Gulbis); the others were Ochoa, Webb, Koreans Il Mi Chung and Mi Hyun Kim, and Japanese Ai Miyazato.

For details of what happened in the main tournaments of the year see 2006 in golf.

== Tournament schedule and results ==
- The winner of **Major** events automatically qualified for the LPGA Playoffs at The ADT. ADT Playoffs points were doubled at Major events.
- The top-20 finishers in **Points** events earned double ADT Playoffs points.
- The champion of **Winner** events automatically qualified for LPGA Playoffs at The ADT. Other top-20 finishers earned single ADT Playoffs points.
- The **Global Group** (pre-determined international events) events were combined to count as one Winner event qualifier, with the player earning the most combined points in these events earning automatic entry to LPGA Playoffs at The ADT. No additional points were awarded.
- **Unofficial** money Events did not count toward entry into the LPGA Playoffs at The ADT.
- The first half of the season concluded with the final full-field domestic event (Jamie Farr Owens Corning Classic) prior to the Tour traveling to Europe.
- The second half concluded with final event (The Mitchell Company Tournament of Champions) prior to the LPGA Playoffs at The ADT.

The number in parentheses after winners' names show the player's total number of official money, individual event wins on the LPGA Tour including that event.

Date	Tournament	Location	ADT Playoff category	Winner	Purse ($)	Winner's share ($)
Jan 22	Women's World Cup of Golf	South Africa	unofficial	Sweden (Annika Sörenstam & Liselotte Neumann)		
Feb 18	SBS Open at Turtle Bay	Hawaii	points	(South Korea) Joo Mi Kim (1)	1,000,000	150,000
Feb 25	Fields Open in Hawaii	Hawaii	points	(South Korea) Meena Lee (2)	1,100,000	165,000
Mar 12	MasterCard Classic	Mexico	points	(Sweden) Annika Sörenstam (67)	1,200,000	180,000
Mar 19	Safeway International	Arizona	points	(United States) Juli Inkster (31)	1,400,000	210,000
Apr 2	**Kraft Nabisco Championship**	California	major	(Australia) Karrie Webb (31)	1,800,000	270,000
Apr 15	LPGA Takefuji Classic	Nevada	points	(Mexico) Lorena Ochoa (4)	1,100,000	165,000
Apr 23	Florida's Natural Charity Championship	Georgia	points	(South Korea) Sung Ah Yim (1)	1,400,000	210,000
Apr 30	Ginn Clubs & Resorts Open	Florida	points	(South Korea) Mi Hyun Kim (6)	2,500,000	375,000
May 7	Franklin American Mortgage Championship	Tennessee	points	(United States) Cristie Kerr (7)	1,100,000	165,000
May 14	Michelob ULTRA Open at Kingsmill	Virginia	winner	(Australia) Karrie Webb (32)	2,200,000	330,000
May 21	Sybase Classic *	New York	points	(Mexico) Lorena Ochoa (5)	1,300,000	195,000
May 28	LPGA Corning Classic	New York	points	(South Korea) Hee-Won Han (5)	1,200,000	180,000
Jun 4	ShopRite LPGA Classic	New Jersey	points	(South Korea) Seon Hwa Lee (1)	1,500,000	225,000
Jun 11	**McDonald's LPGA Championship**	Maryland	major	(South Korea) Se Ri Pak (23)	1,800,000	270,000
Jun 25	Wegmans LPGA	New York	points	(South Korea) Jeong Jang (2)	1,800,000	270,000
Jul 2	**U.S. Women's Open**	Rhode Island	major	(Sweden) Annika Sörenstam (68)	3,100,000	560,000
Jul 9	HSBC Women's World Match Play Championship	New Jersey	winner	(United States) Brittany Lincicome (1)	2,000,000	500,000
Jul 16	Jamie Farr Owens Corning Classic	Ohio	points	(South Korea) Mi Hyun Kim (7)	1,200,000	180,000
Start of second half of season
Jul 29	Evian Masters	France	winner	(Australia) Karrie Webb (33)	3,000,000	450,000
Aug 6	**Weetabix Women's British Open**	England	major	(United States) Sherri Steinhauer (7)	1,800,000	305,440
Aug 13	CN Canadian Women's Open	Ontario	points	(United States) Cristie Kerr (8)	1,700,000	255,000
Aug 20	Safeway Classic	Oregon	points	(United States) Pat Hurst (5)	1,400,000	210,000
Aug 27	Wendy's Championship for Children	Ohio	points	(Mexico) Lorena Ochoa (6)	1,100,000	165,000
Sep 3	State Farm Classic	Illinois	points	(Sweden) Annika Sörenstam (69)	1,300,000	195,000
Sep 10	John Q. Hammons Hotel Classic	Oklahoma	points	(United States) Cristie Kerr (9)	1,000,000	150,000
Sep 24	Longs Drugs Challenge	California	points	(Australia) Karrie Webb (34)	1,100,000	165,000
Oct 8	Corona Morelia Championship	Mexico	points	(Mexico) Lorena Ochoa (7)	1,000,000	150,000
Oct 15	Samsung World Championship	California	winner	(Mexico) Lorena Ochoa (8)	875,000	218,750
Oct 22	Honda LPGA Thailand	Thailand	global group	(South Korea) Hee-Won Han (6)	1,300,000	195,000
Oct 29	KOLON-Hana Bank Championship	South Korea	global group	(South Korea) Jin Joo Hong (1)	1,350,000	202,500
Nov 5	Mizuno Classic	Japan	global group	(Australia) Karrie Webb (35)	1,200,000	180,000
Nov 12	The Mitchell Company Tournament of Champions	Alabama	winner	(Mexico) Lorena Ochoa (9)	1,000,000	150,000
Nov 19	ADT Championship	Florida	n/a	(Paraguay) Julieta Granada (1)	1,550,000	1,000,000
Dec 17	Lexus Cup	Singapore	unofficial	Team Asia	n/a	
Dec 24	Wendy's 3-Tour Challenge	Nevada	unofficial	PGA Tour	n/a	

Tournaments in bold are majors.
* tournament shortened to 54 holes because of rain.

== Leaders ==
Money List leaders

Rank	Player	Country	Earnings ($)	Events
1	Lorena Ochoa	Mexico	2,592,872	25
2	Karrie Webb	Australia	2,090,113	21
3	Annika Sörenstam	Sweden	1,971,741	20
4	Julieta Granada	Paraguay	1,633,586	31
5	Cristie Kerr	United States	1,578,362	26
6	Mi Hyun Kim	South Korea	1,332,274	30
7	Juli Inkster	United States	1,326,442	21
8	Jang Jeong	South Korea	1,151,070	27
9	Hee-Won Han	South Korea	1,147,651	28
10	Pat Hurst	United States	1,128,662	19

Scoring Average leaders

Rank	Player	Country	Average
1	Lorena Ochoa	Mexico	69.24
2	Annika Sörenstam	Sweden	69.82
3	Cristie Kerr	United States	70.07
4	Karrie Webb	Australia	70.11
5	Juli Inkster	United States	70.48

== Award winners ==
The three competitive awards given out by the LPGA each year are:

- The Rolex Player of the Year is awarded based on a formula in which points are awarded for top-10 finishes and are doubled at the LPGA's four major championships and at the season-ending ADT Championship. The points system is: 30 points for first; 12 points for second; nine points for third; seven points for fourth; six points for fifth; five points for sixth; four points for seventh; three points for eighth; two points for ninth and one point for 10th.
  - 2006 Winner: Lorena Ochoa. Runner-up: Karrie Webb
- The Vare Trophy, named for Glenna Collett-Vare, is given to the player with the lowest scoring average for the season.
  - 2006 Winner: Lorena Ochoa. Runner-up: Annika Sörenstam
- The Louise Suggs Rolex Rookie of the Year Award is awarded to the first-year player on the LPGA Tour who scores the highest in a points competition in which points are awarded at all full-field domestic events and doubled at the LPGA's four major championships. The points system is: 150 points for first; 80 points for second; 75 points for third; 70 points for fourth; and 65 points for fifth. After fifth place, points are awarded in increments of three, beginning at sixth place with 62 points. Rookies who make the cut in an event and finish below 41st each receive five points. The award is named after Louise Suggs, one of the founders of the LPGA.
  - 2006 Winner: Seon Hwa Lee. Runner-up: Julieta Granada

== See also ==
- 2006 in golf
- 2006 Ladies European Tour
- 2006 Duramed Futures Tour
