= Karrie Webb =

Australian professional golfer (born 1972)

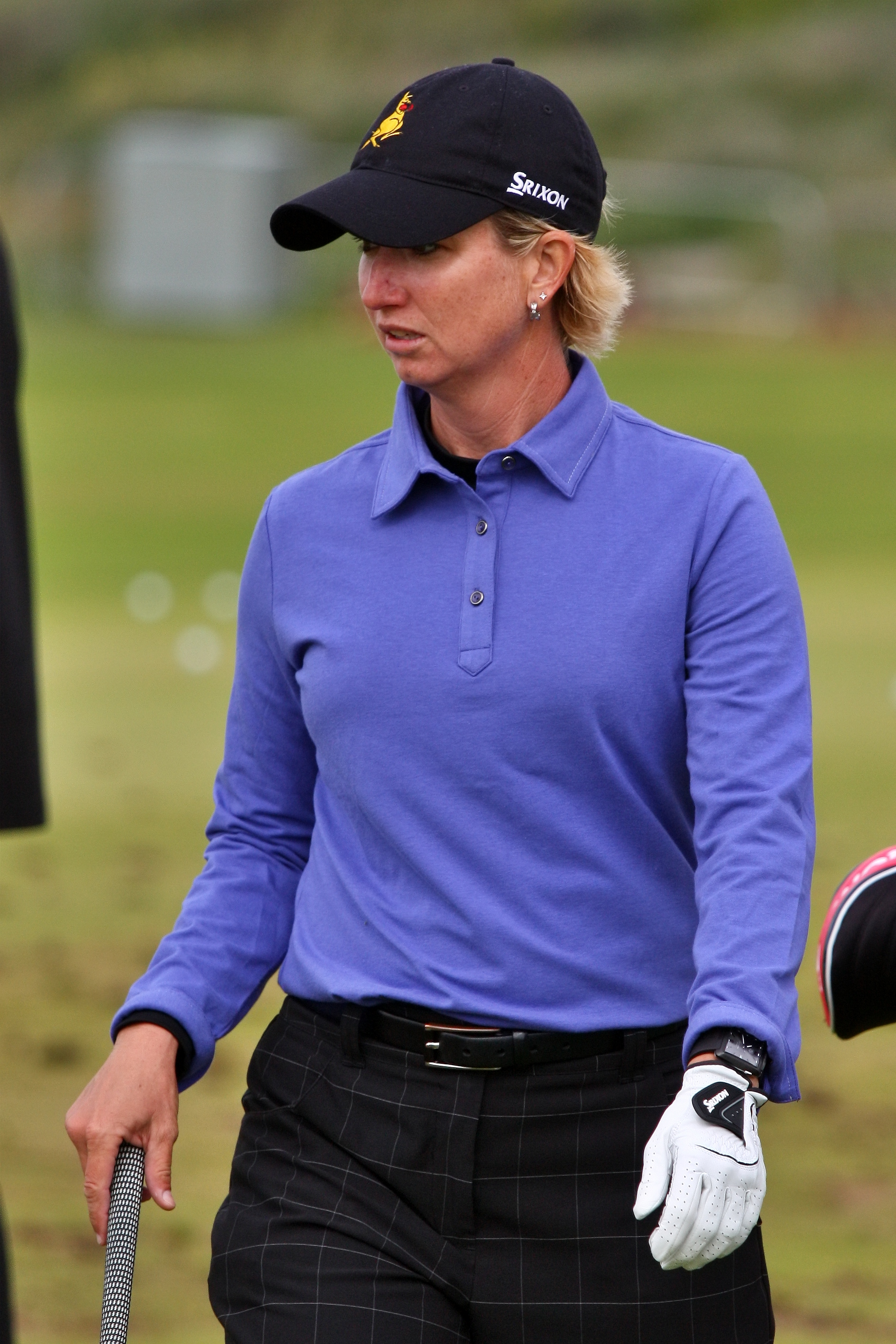
- Webb at the 2010 Women's British Open

Personal information
- Full name: Karrie Anne Webb
- Nationality: Australia
- Born: 21 December 1974 (age 51) Ayr, Queensland, Australia
- Height: 5 ft 6 in (168 cm)

Career
- Sport: Golf
- Turned professional: 1994
- Current tours: LPGA Tour (joined 1996); ALPG Tour (joined 1994)
- Former tour: Ladies European Tour
- Professional wins: 56

Number of wins by tour
- LPGA Tour: 41 (T10 all-time)
- Ladies European Tour: 15
- LPGA of Japan Tour: 3
- WPGA Tour of Australasia: 13
- Epson Tour: 1
- Other: 2

Best results in LPGA major championships (wins: 7)
- Chevron Championship: Won: 2000, 2006
- Women's PGA C'ship: Won: 2001
- U.S. Women's Open: Won: 2000, 2001
- du Maurier Classic: Won: 1999
- Women's British Open: Won: 2002
- Evian Championship: 2nd: 2014

Achievements and awards
- World Golf Hall of Fame: 2005 (member page)
- Ladies European Tour Rookie of the Year: 1995
- LPGA Rookie of the Year: 1996
- LPGA Tour Money Winner: 1996, 1999, 2000
- LPGA Tour Player of the Year: 1999, 2000
- LPGA Vare Trophy: 1997, 1999, 2000
- LPGA Achievement Award: 2000
- GWAA Female Player of the Year: 2000
- William and Mousie Powell Award: 2016

Karrie Anne Webb AO (born 21 December 1974) is an Australian professional golfer. She plays mainly on the U.S.-based LPGA Tour, and also turns out once or twice a year on the ALPG Tour in her home country. She is a member of the World Golf Hall of Fame. She has 41 wins on the LPGA Tour, more than any other active player.

== Early life and amateur career ==
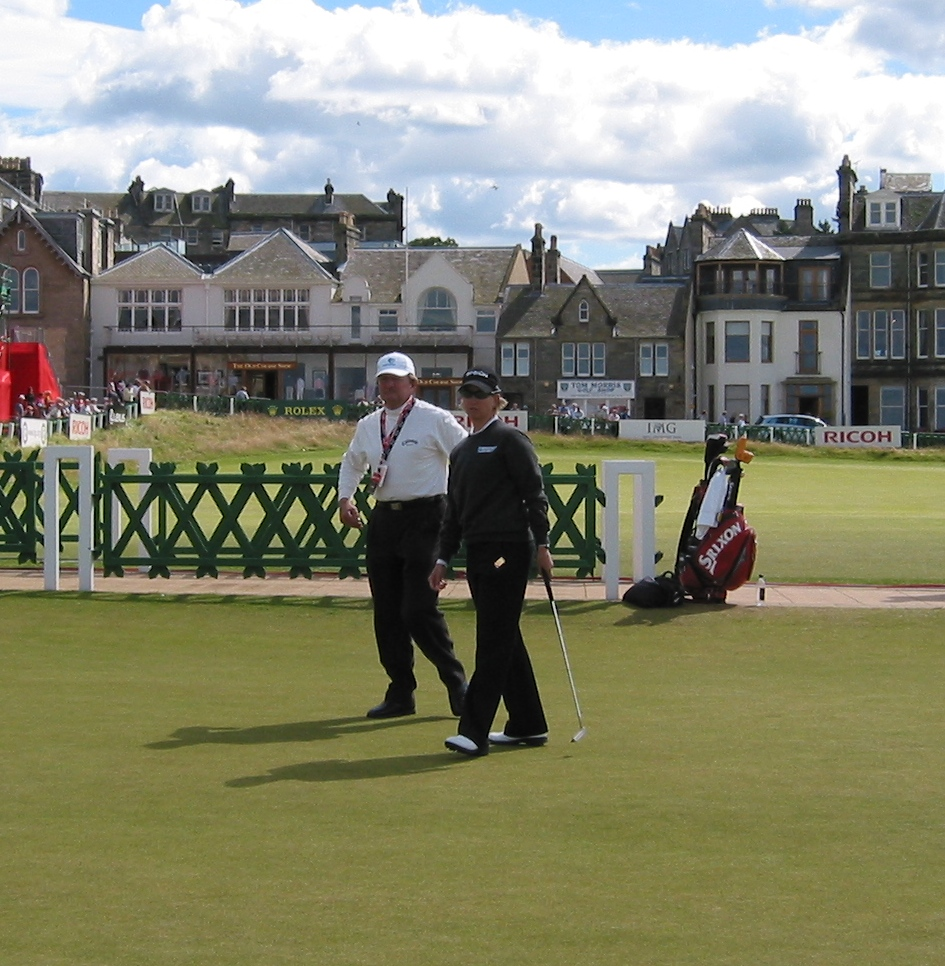
Webb at the 2007 Women's British Open

Webb was born in Ayr, Queensland. She was a member of the Australian Amateur team, making six international appearances from 1992 to 1994, including a 1994 appearance in the Espirito Santo Trophy World Amateur Golf Team Championships. This was the year she became the Australian Stroke Play Champion

== Professional career ==
Webb began her professional golfing career in 1994 playing on the Ladies European Tour, where she finished second at the Women's Australian Open, and the Futures Tour in the U.S., where she won one tournament. In 1995 she became the youngest ever winner of the Weetabix Women's British Open in her rookie season in Europe, prior to it being classed as an LPGA major, and was European Rookie of the Year. She qualified for the LPGA Tour after she finished second at the LPGA Final Qualifying Tournament, despite playing with a broken bone in her wrist.

In 1996 Webb won her first LPGA tournament in her second LPGA start at the HealthSouth Inaugural, on the fourth hole of a sudden death playoff. She won three other tournaments and became the first LPGA player to win $1 million mark in a single season, topping the year end money list. She was also the 1996 LPGA Rookie of the Year.

In 1997 Webb won three times on the LPGA Tour including another win at the Weetabix Women's British Open, won her first Vare Trophy and was voted 1997 ESPY Best Female Golfer. In 1999 Webb won her first major championship at the du Maurier Ltd. Classic and won her first LPGA Tour Player of the Year award.

Webb also took part in the largest playoff in LPGA Tour history at the 1999 Jamie Farr Kroger Classic. Se Ri Pak birdied the first sudden death playoff hole to defeat Webb, Mardi Lunn, Carin Koch, Sherri Steinhauer, and Kelli Kuehne.

In 2000, Webb won two more major championships, following up her win at the Nabisco Championship with a win at the U.S. Women's Open. This gained her a second consecutive Rolex Player of the Year title and Vare Trophy, and she topped the money list, missing out on a chance to become the LPGA's first single-season $2 million winner by taking a mid season break to return home to Australia to run with the Olympic torch. Teamed with Rachel Hetherington representing Australia she won the Women's World Cup in Malaysia, was awarded the preeminent sport award in Australia, the Dawn Fraser Award. and was named Female Player of the Year by the Golf Writers Association of America.

She successfully defended her U.S. Women's Open title in 2001 and won the LPGA Championship, to become the youngest winner of the LPGA Career Grand Slam. She teamed with David Duval to play against Annika Sörenstam and Tiger Woods in a made-for-TV Battle at Bighorn between the two best male and two best female players in the world. At the time, it provided women's golf its largest audience ever. Webb's win at the 2002 Women's British Open, which had become an LPGA major in 2001, meant she completed a Super Career Grand Slam – every available major championship in women's golf in her career.

Webb then suffered a three-year slump. She collected just two LPGA wins in the next two years, and in 2005 had a best LPGA finish of tied sixth although she did team up with Rachel Hetherington to represent Australia at the Women's World Cup of Golf and won her fifth ANZ Ladies Masters title back home in Australia.

Webb qualified for entry to the World Golf Hall of Fame in 2000, but was not eligible for induction until she had played ten LPGA Tour events in each of ten seasons. She met this criterion on 9 June 2005 when she completed the first round of the LPGA Championship. At age 30, she became the youngest living person ever to enter the Hall of Fame, and kept that distinction until 2007, when fellow LPGA star Se Ri Pak was inducted.

Webb staged a comeback season in 2006. In the final round at the Kraft Nabisco Championship she holed a 116-yard shot from the fairway to eagle the 18th hole, and then birdied the same hole in a sudden-death playoff to beat Lorena Ochoa and win her second Kraft Nabisco Championship. She won four other tournaments including the Evian Masters and Mizuno Classic. Her 2006 Kraft Nabisco win took her into the top ten of the Women's World Golf Rankings for the first time since they were introduced in February 2006.

Her 41 LPGA Tour victories places her tied for 10th with Babe Zaharias on the list of players with the most career LPGA tournament wins and first among all active players.

== Awards and honors ==
- In 1995, she earned Rookie of the Year honors on the Ladies European Tour. The following year she earned Rookie of the Year honors on the LPGA Tour.
- In 1996, she won the money list on the LPGA Tour. She also won the money list in 1999 and 2000.
- In 1999 and 2000, she earned Player of the Year honors on the LPGA Tou.
- In 2005, she was elected to the World Golf Hall of Fame.

== Professional wins (56) ==
=== LPGA Tour wins (41) ===
Legend
Major championships (7)
Other LPGA Tour (34)

No.	Date	Tournament	Winning score	Margin of victory	Runner(s)-up
1	20 Aug 1995	Women's British Open^{1}	−14 (69-70-69-70=278)	6 strokes	(United States) Jill McGill (Sweden) Annika Sörenstam
2	21 Jan 1996	HealthSouth Inaugural	−7 (70-70-69=209)	Playoff	(United States) Jane Geddes (United States) Martha Nause
3	5 May 1996	Sprint Titleholders Championship	−16 (71-65-70-66=272)	1 stroke	(United States) Kelly Robbins
4	15 Sep 1996	Safeco Classic	−11 (66-71-71-69=277)	2 shots	(United States) Patty Sheehan
5	24 Nov 1996	ITT LPGA Tour Championship	−16 (69-70-68-65=272)	4 strokes	(United States) Emilee Klein (United States) Nancy Lopez (United States) Kelly Robbins
6	20 Apr 1997	Susan G. Komen International	−12 (72-72-66-66=276)	2 strokes	(United States) Nanci Bowen (United States) Cathy Johnston-Forbes (Canada) Lorie Kane
7	17 Aug 1997	Women's British Open^{1}	−19 (65-70-63-71=269)	8 strokes	(United States) Rosie Jones
8	14 Sep 1997	Safeco Classic	−16 (67-67-71-67=272)	1 stroke	(Sweden) Annika Sörenstam
9	1 Mar 1998	Australian Ladies Masters^{2}	−16 (69-69-64-70=272)	5 strokes	(South Korea) Hyun Soon Park (Sweden) Annika Sörenstam
10	19 Apr 1998	City of Hope Myrtle Beach Classic	−19 (68-66-68-67=269)	3 strokes	(United States) Meg Mallon
11	30 Jan 1999	The Office Depot	−10 (67-69-72-70=278)	1 stroke	(United States) Dottie Pepper (United States) Kris Tschetter
12	28 Feb 1999	Australian Ladies Masters^{2}	−26 (63-67-64-68=262)	10 strokes	(Scotland) Janice Moodie
13	21 Mar 1999	Standard Register PING	−14 (68-68-69-69=274)	4 strokes	(Canada) Lorie Kane
14	9 May 1999	Mercury Titleholders Championship	−17 (69-66-70-66=271)	3 strokes	(Sweden) Annika Sörenstam
15	13 Jun 1999	Wegmans Rochester International	−8 (75-67-68-70=280)	1 stroke	(United States) Cindy McCurdy
16	1 Aug 1999	**du Maurier Classic**	−11 (73-72-66-66=277)	2 strokes	(England) Laura Davies
17	16 Jan 2000	The Office Depot	−7 (65-75-70-71=281)	4 strokes	(United States) Juli Inkster
18	27 Feb 2000	Australian Ladies Masters^{2}	−14 (68-68-70-68=274)	1 stroke	(Canada) Lorie Kane
19	4 Mar 2000	LPGA Takefuji Classic	−9 (68-70-69=207)	Playoff	(Sweden) Annika Sörenstam
20	26 Mar 2000	**Nabisco Championship**	−14 (67-70-67-70=274)	10 strokes	(United States) Dottie Pepper
21	23 Jul 2000	**U.S. Women's Open**	−6 (69-72-68-73=282)	5 strokes	(United States) Meg Mallon (United States) Cristie Kerr
22	27 Aug 2000	Oldsmobile Classic	−23 (66-61-66-72=265)	2 strokes	(United States) Meg Mallon
23	22 Oct 2000	AFLAC Champions	−15 (69-67-68-69=273)	Playoff	(United States) Dottie Pepper
24	3 Jun 2001	**U.S. Women's Open**	−7 (70-65-69-69=273)	8 strokes	(South Korea) Se Ri Pak
25	24 Jun 2001	**McDonald's LPGA Championship**	−14 (67-64-70-69=270)	2 strokes	(United States) Laura Diaz
26	18 Nov 2001	Tyco/ADT Championship	−9 (67-71-73-68=279)	2 strokes	(Sweden) Annika Sörenstam
27	23 Jun 2002	Wegmans Rochester LPGA	−12 (64-72-72-68=276)	1 stroke	(South Korea) Mi Hyun Kim
28	11 Aug 2002	**Women's British Open**^{1}	−15 (66-71-70-66=273)	2 strokes	(Australia) Michelle Ellis (Spain) Paula Martí
29	7 Sep 2003	John Q. Hammons Hotel Classic	−10 (65-69-66=200)	9 strokes	(United States) Dorothy Delasin (Taiwan) Candie Kung (United States) Jamie Hullett (United States) Tammie Green
30	6 Jun 2004	Kellogg-Keebler Classic	−16 (69-64-67=200)	5 strokes	(Malaysia) Siew-Ai Lim (Sweden) Annika Sörenstam
31	2 Apr 2006	**Kraft Nabisco Championship**	−9 (70-68-76-65=279)	Playoff	(Mexico) Lorena Ochoa
32	14 May 2006	Michelob ULTRA Open at Kingsmill	−14 (66-68-66-70=270)	7 strokes	(Mexico) Lorena Ochoa (South Korea) Hee-Won Han
33	29 Jul 2006	Evian Masters^{1}	−16 (67-68-69-68=272)	1 stroke	(England) Laura Davies (United States) Michelle Wie
34	24 Sep 2006	Longs Drugs Challenge	−15 (67-70-66-70=273)	1 stroke	(Sweden) Annika Sörenstam
35	5 Nov 2006	Mizuno Classic^{3}	−14 (69-67-66=202)	4 strokes	(Japan) Kaori Higo
36	29 Mar 2009	J Golf Phoenix LPGA International	−14 (70-68-69-67=274)	2 strokes	(South Korea) Jiyai Shin
37	27 Feb 2011	HSBC Women's Champions	−13 (70-66-70-69=275)	1 stroke	(Japan) Chie Arimura
38	20 Mar 2011	RR Donnelley LPGA Founders Cup	−12 (71-67-66=204)	1 stroke	(United States) Brittany Lincicome (United States) Paula Creamer
39	2 Jun 2013	ShopRite LPGA Classic	−4 (72-69-68=209)	2 strokes	(China) Shanshan Feng
40	16 Feb 2014	ISPS Handa Women's Australian Open^{5}	−12 (71-69-68-68=276)	1 stroke	(South Korea) Chella Choi
41	23 Mar 2014	JTBC Founders Cup	−19 (66-71-69-63=269)	1 stroke	(New Zealand) Lydia Ko (South Korea) Mirim Lee (United States) Stacy Lewis (Spain) Azahara Muñoz (South Korea) Amy Yang

LPGA Tour playoff record (4–6)

No.	Year	Tournament	Opponent(s)	Result
1	1996	HealthSouth Inaugural	(United States) Jane Geddes (United States) Martha Nause	Won with par on fourth extra hole Nause eliminated by par on first hole
2	1997	HealthSouth Inaugural	(United States) Michelle McGann	Lost to par on first extra hole
3	1999	Jamie Farr Kroger Classic	(Sweden) Carin Koch (United States) Kelli Kuehne (Australia) Mardi Lunn (South Korea) Se Ri Pak (United States) Sherri Steinhauer	Pak won with birdie on first extra hole
4	1999	PageNet Championship	(England) Laura Davies (South Korea) Se Ri Pak	Pak won with birdie on first extra hole
5	2000	LPGA Takefuji Classic	(Sweden) Annika Sörenstam	Won with birdie on first extra hole
6	2000	Evian Masters	(Sweden) Annika Sörenstam	Lost to eagle on first extra hole
7	2000	AFLAC Champions	(United States) Dottie Pepper	Won with par on first extra hole
8	2006	**Kraft Nabisco Championship**	(Mexico) Lorena Ochoa	Won with birdie on first extra hole
9	2006	**McDonald's LPGA Championship**	(South Korea) Se Ri Pak	Lost to birdie on first extra hole
10	2008	Ginn Tribute Hosted by Annika	(South Korea) Seon Hwa Lee	Lost to par on first extra hole

LPGA majors are shown in bold.

=== ALPG Tour wins (13) ===
- 1998 (1) Australian Ladies Masters^{2}
- 1999 (1) Australian Ladies Masters^{2}
- 2000 (2) AAMI Women's Australian Open^{4}, Australian Ladies Masters^{2}
- 2001 (1) ANZ Ladies Masters^{4}
- 2002 (1) AAMI Women's Australian Open^{4}
- 2005 (1) ANZ Ladies Masters^{4}
- 2007 (2) MFS Women's Australian Open^{4}, ANZ Ladies Masters^{4}
- 2008 (1) MFS Women's Australian Open^{4}
- 2010 (1) ANZ Ladies Masters^{4}
- 2013 (1) Volvik RACV Ladies Masters^{4}
- 2014 (1) ISPS Handa Women's Australian Open^{5}

=== LPGA of Japan Tour wins (3) ===
- 2000 (1) Nichirei Cup World Ladies
- 2001 (1) Nichirei Cup World Ladies
- 2006 (1) Mizuno Classic^{3}

=== Ladies European Tour wins (15) ===
- 1995 (1) Women's British Open^{1}
- 1997 (1) Women's British Open^{1}
- 2000 (1) AAMI Women's Australian Open^{4}
- 2001 (1) ANZ Ladies Masters^{4}
- 2002 (2) AAMI Women's Australian Open^{4}, **Women's British Open**^{1}
- 2005 (1) ANZ Ladies Masters^{4}
- 2006 (1) Evian Masters^{1}
- 2007 (2) MFS Women's Australian Open^{4}, ANZ Ladies Masters^{4}
- 2008 (1) MFS Women's Australian Open^{4}
- 2010 (1) ANZ Ladies Masters^{4}
- 2013 (2) Volvik RACV Ladies Masters^{4}, ISPS Handa Ladies European Masters
- 2014 (1) ISPS Handa Women's Australian Open^{5}

Note: Webb won The Evian Championship (formerly named the Evian Masters) once before it was recognized as a major championship on the LPGA Tour in 2013, but after it was co-sanctioned by the LPGA Tour in 2000. Webb won the Women's British Open twice before it was recognized as a major championship on the LPGA Tour in 2001, but after it was co-sanctioned by the LPGA Tour in 1994 and once after it was recognized as a major championship in 2001.

=== Futures Tour wins (1) ===
- 1995 Golden Flake Golden Ocala Futures Classic

=== Other wins (2) ===
- 2000 Women's World Cup Golf (with Rachel Hetherington)
- 2003 ConAgra LPGA Skins Game

== Notes ==
- ^{1} Co-sanctioned by LPGA Tour and Ladies European Tour
- ^{2} Co-sanctioned by LPGA Tour and ALPG Tour
- ^{3} Co-sanctioned by LPGA Tour and LPGA of Japan Tour
- ^{4} Co-sanctioned by ALPG Tour and Ladies European Tour
- ^{5} Co-sanctioned by ALPG Tour, Ladies European Tour, and LPGA Tour

== Major championships ==
=== Wins (7) ===
Year	Championship	Winning score	Margin	Runner(s)-up
1999	du Maurier Classic	−11 (73-72-66-66=277)	2 strokes	(England) Laura Davies
2000	Nabisco Championship	−14 (67-70-67-70=274)	10 strokes	(United States) Dottie Pepper
2000	U.S. Women's Open	−6 (69-72-68-73=282)	5 strokes	(United States) Cristie Kerr, (United States) Meg Mallon
2001	McDonald's LPGA Championship	−14 (67-64-70-69=270)	2 strokes	(United States) Laura Diaz
2001	U.S. Women's Open	−7 (70-65-69-69=273)	8 strokes	(South Korea) Se Ri Pak
2002	Women's British Open	−15 (66-71-70-66=273)	2 strokes	(Australia) Michelle Ellis, (Spain) Paula Martí
2006	Kraft Nabisco Championship	−9 (70-68-76-65=279)	Playoff ^{1}	(Mexico) Lorena Ochoa

^{1} Defeated Ochoa with birdie on first extra hole

=== Results timeline ===
Results not in chronological order.

Tournament	1996	1997	1998	1999	2000
Chevron Championship	T5	29	T7	3	1
Women's PGA Championship	T41	T9	T4	CUT	T9
U.S. Women's Open	T19	4	T31	7	1
du Maurier Classic ^	T2	T27	T14	1	T7

Tournament	2001	2002	2003	2004	2005	2006	2007	2008	2009	2010
Chevron Championship	T2	7	T21	3	T44	1	T20	T13	T8	T5
Women's PGA Championship	1	T4	T56	T39	T20	2	2	T29	T49	T5
U.S. Women's Open	1	CUT	CUT	T16	T31	T37	CUT	T38	T34	T17
Women's British Open†	T15	1	T3		T11	CUT	T28	T9	2	T43

Tournament	2011	2012	2013	2014	2015	2016	2017	2018	2019	2020
Chevron Championship	T13	T15	T5	T11	T29	T56	CUT		CUT	
U.S. Women's Open	T6	T50	T13	T30	T14	T46	T44	CUT	CUT	
Women's PGA Championship	T20	T6	T33	T25	T7	T50	CUT	T47	CUT	
The Evian Championship ^^			T15	2	T38	CUT	CUT			NT
Women's British Open	T22	T5	CUT	CUT	CUT	T5	CUT	CUT	CUT	

Tournament	2021	2022	2023	2024
Chevron Championship				
U.S. Women's Open				
Women's PGA Championship				
The Evian Championship ^^				
Women's British Open				CUT

^ The Women's British Open replaced the du Maurier Classic as an LPGA major in 2001.
^^ The Evian Championship was added as a major in 2013
† Webb won the Women's British Open in 1995 and 1997 before it became an LPGA major.

Win
Top 10
Did not play

CUT = missed the half-way cut
NT = no tournament
"T" = tied for place

=== Summary ===
Tournament	Wins	2nd	3rd	Top-5	Top-10	Top-25	Events	Cuts made
ANA Inspiration	2	1	2	8	11	17	23	21
U.S. Women's Open	2	0	0	3	5	10	24	19
Women's PGA Championship	1	2	0	6	10	13	24	21
The Evian Championship	0	1	0	1	1	2	5	3
Women's British Open	1	1	1	5	6	9	19	11
du Maurier Classic	1	1	0	2	3	4	5	5
Totals	7	6	3	25	36	55	100	80

- Most consecutive cuts made – 23 (2007 British Open – 2013 U.S. Open)
- Longest streak of top-10s – 9 (1999 U.S. Open – 2001 U.S. Open)

== LPGA Tour career summary ==
Year	Tournaments played	Cuts Made*	Wins	2nd	3rd	Top 10s	Best Finish	Earnings ($)	Money list rank	Scoring average	Scoring rank
1995	1	1	1	0	0	1	1	n/a	n/a	69.50	n/a
1996	25	24	4	5	1	15	1	1,002,000	1	70.87	3
1997	25	25	3	4	3	20	1	987,606	2	70.00	1
1998	23	22	2	1	3	13	1	704,477	4	70.52	3
1999	25	23	6	6	4	22	1	1,591,959	1	69.43	1
2000	22	22	7	3	1	17	1	1,876,853	1	70.05	1
2001	22	22	3	4	0	13	1	1,535,404	3	70.16	3
2002	21	20	2	0	4	13	1	1,009,760	5	70.33	3
2003	23	21	1	1	1	12	1	780,239	11	70.39	5
2004	22	21	1	1	2	8	1	748,316	9	70.53	6
2005	21	20	0	1	0	7	2	500,268	27	71.52	16
2006	21	20	5	3	1	13	1	2,090,113	2	70.11	4
2007	21	19	0	1	1	6	2	630,030	22	71.93	18
2008	20	19	0	2	1	6	2	854,562	18	71.24	11
2009	20	18	1	2	0	6	1	968,098	12	71.26	18
2010	19	18	0	0	0	6	T4	479,889	23	71.06	12
2011	20	20	2	0	1	5	1	757,671	14	71.56	17
2012	20	20	0	1	1	7	T2	884,973	12	71.19	18
2013	21	19	1	0	0	6	1	765,880	13	70.64	8
2014	19	18	2	1	1	6	1	1,069,540	8	70.74	12
2015	22	18	0	0	0	3	T5	394,497	43	71.47	34
2016	20	15	0	0	1	3	3	378,876	52	71.49	43
2017	19	9	0	1	0	1	T2	168,498	80	72.56	131
2018	8	5	0	0	0	0	T11	65,055	119	71.68	n/a
2019	9	4	0	0	0	0	T27	25,685	148	73.05	n/a
2020	3	0	0	0	0	0	MC	0	n/a	74.67	n/a
2021	Did not play										
2022	3	2	0	0	0	0	T15	23,368	170	73.00	n/a
Totals^	494 (1996)	444 (1996)	41	37	26	207 (1996)	1	20,293,617	2		

^ official as of 13 July 2022
* Includes matchplay and other tournaments without a cut.

== World ranking ==
Position in Women's World Golf Rankings at the end of each calendar year.

Year	World ranking	Source
2006	3	
2007	2	
2008	10	
2009	13	
2010	15	
2011	18	
2012	16	
2013	8	
2014	9	
2015	31	
2016	63	
2017	97	
2018	199	
2019	451	
2020	592	
2021	1165	
2022	790	
2023	919	
2024	1,211	

== Honours ==
Webb was awarded the Centenary Medal on 1 January 2001.

On 26 January 2010 Webb was appointed a Member of the Order of Australia for service to golf, and to the community as a benefactor and supporter of a range of health and disability organisations.

In January 2018 Webb was made an Officer of the Order of Australia (AO) for distinguished service to golf at the elite level as a player, to the development of female golfers, as a mentor and role model, and through charitable and community organisations".

In 2022, she was inducted into Sport Australia Hall of Fame.

== Team appearances ==
Amateur

- Espirito Santo Trophy (representing Australia): 1994
- Tasman Cup (representing Australia): 1993 (winners)
- Queen Sirikit Cup (representing Australia): 1992, 1993, 1994
- Gladys Hay Memorial Cup (representing Queensland): 1991, 1992, 1993

Professional

- World Cup (representing Australia): 2005
- International Crown (representing Australia): 2014, 2016
- The Queens (representing Australia): 2017 (captain)

== See also ==
- List of female golfers
- List of golfers with most LPGA Tour wins
- List of golfers with most LPGA major championship wins
- Monday Night Golf
- Women's Career Grand Slam Champion
