= Australian Ladies Masters =

Golf tournament formerly on the LPGA Tour

Coordinates: 28.007°S 153.378°E

RACV Gold Coast Challenge
Tournament information
- Location: Benowa, Australia
- Established: 1990
- Course: RACV Royal Pines Resort
- Par: 73
- Length: 5,982 yards (5,470 m)
- Tour: ALPG Tour
- Format: Stroke play
- Prize fund: €106,796 approx. A$150,000
- Month played: February
- Final year: 2017

Tournament record score
- Aggregate: 262 Karrie Webb (1999, 2010)
- To par: −26 Karrie Webb (1999, 2010)

Final champion
- (Thailand) Prima Thammaraks

Location in Australia

The RACV Gold Coast Challenge was a golf tournament played in Australia. It was one of the leading tournaments on the ALPG Tour and was co-sanctioned by the Ladies European Tour (LET) since 2001. Between 1997 and 2000 it was an event on the LPGA Tour. It has been played at the RACV Royal Pines Resort in Benowa, Queensland, a suburb of Gold Coast since 1992.

In 2007 the Masters was the richest women's golf tournament in Australia, with a prize fund of A$800,000. Although the 2008 prize fund dropped to A$600,000, the tournament remained the richest in Australia. The 144 strong 2015 field consisted of 50 ALPG players, 50 LET players, 10 LPGA of Korea Tour players, 5 China Ladies Professional Golf Association players, 3 leading players from the Women's World Golf Rankings and sponsor's invitees.

The tournament was founded in 1990 as a 54-hole stroke play event, and was originally called the Australian Ladies Masters. It expanded to 72 holes in 1994. Australia's most successful women golfer Karrie Webb won the event a record eight times.

== Tournament winners ==
Year	Venue	Winner	Country	Score	Margin of victory	Runner(s)-up	Country
RACV Gold Coast Challenge
2017	Royal Pines Resort	Prima Thammaraks	Thailand	213 (−6)	1 stroke	Sarah Jane Smith	Australia
Volvik RACV Ladies Masters
2016	Royal Pines Resort	Jiyai Shin	South Korea	278 (−14)	3 strokes	Holly Clyburn	England
2015	Royal Pines Resort	Su-Hyun Oh	Australia	285 (−7)	3 strokes	Charley Hull	England
2015	Royal Pines Resort	Su-Hyun Oh	Australia	285 (−7)	3 strokes	Katherine Kirk	Australia
2015	Royal Pines Resort	Su-Hyun Oh	Australia	285 (−7)	3 strokes	Florentyna Parker	England
2014	Royal Pines Resort	Cheyenne Woods	United States	276 (−16)	2 strokes	Minjee Lee (amateur)	Australia
2013	Royal Pines Resort	Karrie Webb	Australia	275 (−13)	2 strokes	Chella Choi	South Korea
2013	Royal Pines Resort	Karrie Webb	Australia	275 (−13)	2 strokes	Ariya Jutanugarn	Thailand
2013	Royal Pines Resort	Karrie Webb	Australia	275 (−13)	2 strokes	Su-Hyun Oh	Australia
Gold Coast RACV Australian Ladies Masters
2012	Royal Pines Resort	Christel Boeljon	Netherlands	267 (−21)	1 stroke	Diana Luna	Italy
2012	Royal Pines Resort	Christel Boeljon	Netherlands	267 (−21)	1 stroke	Kim Ha-neul	South Korea
2012	Royal Pines Resort	Christel Boeljon	Netherlands	267 (−21)	1 stroke	Ryu So-yeon	South Korea
ANZ RACV Ladies Masters
2011	Royal Pines Resort	Yani Tseng	Taiwan	264 (−24)	4 strokes	Nikki Campbell	Australia
2011	Royal Pines Resort	Yani Tseng	Taiwan	264 (−24)	4 strokes	Stacy Lewis	United States
ANZ Ladies Masters
2010	Royal Pines Resort	Karrie Webb	Australia	262 (−26)	6 strokes	Katherine Hull	Australia
2010	Royal Pines Resort	Karrie Webb	Australia	262 (−26)	6 strokes	Lee Bo-Mee	South Korea
2009	Royal Pines Resort	Katherine Hull	Australia	272 (−16)	5 strokes	Ryu So-Yeon	South Korea
2009	Royal Pines Resort	Katherine Hull	Australia	272 (−16)	5 strokes	Tamie Durdin	Australia
2008	Royal Pines Resort	Lisa Hall	England	203 (−13)	1 stroke	Shin Hyun-Ju	South Korea
2007	Royal Pines Resort	Karrie Webb	Australia	269 (−19)	2 strokes	Jiyai Shin	South Korea
2006	Royal Pines Resort	Amy Yang (amateur)	South Korea	275 (−13)	Playoff	Catherine Cartwright	United States
2005	Royal Pines Resort	Karrie Webb	Australia	271 (−16)	1 stroke	Ai Miyazato	Japan
2004	Royal Pines Resort	Annika Sörenstam	Sweden	269 (−19)	4 strokes	Karen Stupples	England
2003	Royal Pines Resort	Laura Davies	England	203 (−13)	1 stroke	Rebecca Stevenson	Australia
2003	Royal Pines Resort	Laura Davies	England	203 (−13)	1 stroke	Karrie Webb	Australia
2002	Royal Pines Resort	Annika Sörenstam	Sweden	278 (−10)	Playoff	Karrie Webb	Australia
2001	Royal Pines Resort	Karrie Webb	Australia	271 (−17)	8 strokes	Rachel Teske	Australia
Australian Ladies Masters
2000	Royal Pines Resort	Karrie Webb	Australia	274 (−14)	1 stroke	Lorie Kane	Canada
1999	Royal Pines Resort	Karrie Webb	Australia	262 (−26)	10 strokes	Janice Moodie	Scotland
1998	Royal Pines Resort	Karrie Webb	Australia	272 (−16)	5 strokes	Park Hyun-Soon	South Korea
1998	Royal Pines Resort	Karrie Webb	Australia	272 (−16)	5 strokes	Annika Sörenstam	Sweden
Alpine Australian Ladies Masters
1997	Royal Pines Resort	Gail Graham	Canada	273 (−15)	1 stroke	Karrie Webb	Australia
1996	Royal Pines Resort	Jane Crafter	Australia	273 (−19)	1 stroke	Jane Geddes	United States
1996	Royal Pines Resort	Jane Crafter	Australia	273 (−19)	1 stroke	Laura Davies	England
1995	Royal Pines Resort	Annika Sörenstam	Sweden	270 (−22)	8 strokes	Jane Geddes	United States
1994	Royal Pines Resort	Laura Davies	England	272 (−20)	4 strokes	Karrie Webb	Australia
1993	Royal Pines Resort	Laura Davies	England	211 (−8)	1 stroke	Leigh Ann Mills	United States
1993	Royal Pines Resort	Laura Davies	England	211 (−8)	1 stroke	Jane Geddes	United States
1993	Royal Pines Resort	Laura Davies	England	211 (−8)	1 stroke	Muffin Spencer-Delvin	United States
1992	Royal Pines Resort	Jane Crafter	Australia	207 (−15)	3 strokes	Brandie Burton	United States
1992	Royal Pines Resort	Jane Crafter	Australia	207 (−15)	3 strokes	Jane Geddes	United States
1992	Royal Pines Resort	Jane Crafter	Australia	207 (−15)	3 strokes	Leigh Ann Mills	United States
Daikyo Australian Ladies Masters
1991	Palm Meadows	Jane Geddes	United States	209 (−13)	3 strokes	Corinne Dibnah	Australia
1990	Palm Meadows	Jane Geddes	United States	209 (−13)	Playoff	Kristal Parker	United States

Contested over 54 holes from 1990 through 1993, reduced to 54 holes due to adverse weather in 2008, and contested over 54 holes in 2017.

== Multiple winners ==
Five players won this tournament more than once.

- 8 wins
  - Karrie Webb: 1998, 1999, 2000, 2001, 2005, 2007, 2010, 2013
- 3 wins
  - Annika Sörenstam: 1995, 2002, 2004
  - Laura Davies: 1993, 1994, 2003
- 2 wins
  - Jane Crafter: 1992, 1996
  - Jane Geddes: 1990, 1991
