= 2000 Nabisco Championship =

Coordinates: 33.798°N 116.433°W

Tournament information
- Dates: March 23–26, 2000
- Location: Rancho Mirage, California
- Courses: Mission Hills Country Club; Dinah Shore Tourn. Course
- Tour: LPGA Tour
- Format: Stroke play - 72 holes

Statistics
- Par: 72
- Length: 6,520 yards (5,962 m)
- Field: 98 players, 73 after cut
- Cut: 151 (+7)
- Prize fund: $1.25 million
- Winner's share: $187,500

Champion
- (Australia) Karrie Webb
- 274 (−14)

Location in the United States
Location in California

The 2000 Nabisco Championship was a women's professional golf tournament, held March 23–26 at Mission Hills Country Club in Rancho Mirage, California. This was the 29th edition of the Kraft Nabisco Championship, and the eighteenth as a major championship.

Karrie Webb won the first of her two titles in this event, ten strokes ahead of Dottie Pepper, the defending champion. It was her second consecutive major win and the second of her seven major titles. Webb held an eight-stroke lead after 54 holes, and shot a final round 70 for a comfortable victory.

== Final leaderboard ==
Sunday, March 26, 2000

Place	Player	Score	To par	Money ($)
1	(Australia) Karrie Webb	67-70-67-70=274	−14	187,500
2	(United States) Dottie Pepper	68-72-72-72=284	−4	116,366
3	(United States) Meg Mallon	75-70-73-67=285	−3	84,916
T4	(United States) Cathy Johnston-Forbes	74-71-71-70=286	−2	59,755
T4	(United States) Michele Redman	73-73-69-71=286	−2	59,755
T6	(England) Helen Dobson	73-74-72-68=287	−1	40,570
T6	(United States) Christa Johnson	73-68-73-73=287	−1	40,570
T8	(United States) Rosie Jones	74-71-74-69=288	E	31,135
T8	(United States) Kim Saiki-Maloney	72-77-68-71=288	E	31,135
T10	(Australia) Wendy Doolan	73-73-69-74=289	+1	24,170
T10	(United States) Pat Hurst	72-72-70-75=289	+1	24,170
T10	(Peru) (Sweden) Jenny Lidback	75-72-74-68=289	+1	24,170
T10	(South Korea) (Thailand) Aree Wongluekiet (a)	75-71-68-75=289	+1	0

(a) - denotes amateur
