= Volvik =

South Korean golf equipment maker

Coordinates: 37.50415°N 127.0649°E

Volvik Inc.

- Native name: 볼빅
- Formerly: Volvik
- Traded as: 206950 on KONEX
- Industry: Golf equipment and Sportswear
- Founded: May 1980
- Headquarters: 333 Yeongdong-daero (Dongwon Building 5th Floor), Gangnam District, South Korea
- Key people: Kyung-Ahn Moon (CEO)

Volvik (Korean: 볼빅) is a South Korean golf equipment and sportswear manufacturer famous for its colored golf balls. Volvik is the sponsor of the World Long Drive Championship, the Australian Ladies Masters, the IOA Championship, and the KPGA Gunsan CC Open. Volvik has parterend with franchises such as Marvel and Micky Mouse as well as producing holiday themed golf balls. Volvik also sells golf apparel through its subsidiary "Volvik Golf Apparel" as well as hygiene products. In April 2023, Volvik trading was suspended due to a audit report and while a Volvik appeal is pending, the stock will not be able to be traded.
