= 2002 Women's British Open =

Coordinates: 55.316°N 4.832°W

Tournament information
- Dates: 8–11 August 2002
- Location: South Ayrshire, Scotland
- Course(s): Turnberry Golf Club, Ailsa Course
- Organized by: Ladies' Golf Union
- Tour(s): LPGA Tour; Ladies European Tour

Statistics
- Par: 72
- Length: 6,407 yards (5,859 m)
- Field: 144 players, 66 after cut
- Cut: 145 (+1)
- Prize fund: $1,500,000 €1,580,107
- Winner's share: $236,383 €249,007

Champion
- (Australia) Karrie Webb
- 273 (−15)

Location in Scotland

The 2002 Women's British Open was held 8–11 August at the Ailsa Course at Turnberry Golf Club in South Ayrshire, Scotland. It was the 26th edition of the Women's British Open, and the second as a major championship on the LPGA Tour. ESPN, ABC Sports and BBC Sport televised the event in the United States and United Kingdom.

Karrie Webb won the sixth of her seven major titles, two strokes ahead of runners-up Michelle Ellis and Paula Martí. Three strokes back after 54 holes, Webb shot a final round 66 (−6) to capture her fifth different major for a career "Super Slam." It was her third victory at the Women's British Open, with previous titles in 1995 and 1997.

Defending champion Se-Ri Pak finished six strokes back, in a tie for eleventh place.

== Course ==
Ailsa Course

Hole	Name	Yards	Par	Hole	Name	Yards	Par
1	Ailsa Craig	350	4	10	Dinna Fouter	410	4
2	Mak Siccar	381	4	11	Maidens	174	3
3	Blaw Wearie	462	5 ^{1}	12	Monument	354	4
4	Woe-Be-Tide	165	3	13	Tickly Tap	379	4
5	Fin Me Oot	416	4	14	Risk-An-Hope	449	5 ^{1}
6	Tappie Toorie	195	3	15	Ca' Canny	169	3
7	Roon The Ben	475	5	16	Wee Burn	367	4
8	Goat Fell	386	4	17	Lang Whang	487	5
9	Bruce's Castle	411	4	18	Ailsa Hame	377	4
Out		3,241	36	In		3,166	36
				Total		6,407	72

- The Open Championship in 1994 was set at par 70 and 6,957 yards (6,361 m), 550 yards (503 m) longer.
- ^{1} These par-4 holes are played as par-5 during this tournament.

== Round summaries ==
=== First round ===
Thursday, 8 August 2002

Place	Player	Score	To par
1	(Taiwan) Candie Kung	65	−7
2	(Australia) Karrie Webb	66	−6
T3	(United States) Tina Barrett	67	−5
T3	(Germany) Elisabeth Esterl	67	−5
T3	(South Korea) Se-ri Pak	67	−5
T3	(Australia) Rachel Teske	67	−5
T7	(Italy) Federica Dassù	68	−4
T7	(South Korea) Mi-Hyun Kim	68	−4
T7	(United States) Emilee Klein	68	−4
T7	(Sweden) Carin Koch	68	−4
T7	(Scotland) Mhairi McKay	68	−4

=== Second round ===
Friday, 9 August 2002

Place	Player	Score	To par
T1	(Sweden) Carin Koch	68-68=136	−8
T1	(Taiwan) Candie Kung	65-71=136	−8
T3	(United States) Tina Barrett	67-70=137	−7
T3	(United States) Beth Bauer	70-67=137	−7
T3	(Spain) Paula Martí	69-68=137	−7
T3	(Australia) Karrie Webb	66-71=137	−7
7	(Germany) Elisabeth Esterl	67-71=138	−6
T8	(Australia) Wendy Doolan	70-69=139	−5
T8	(Australia) Michelle Ellis	69-70=139	−5
T8	(United States) Natalie Gulbis	69-70=139	−5
T8	(United States) Pat Hurst	69-70=139	−5
T8	(United States) Emilee Klein	68-71=139	−5
T8	(Sweden) Catrin Nilsmark	70-69=139	−5
T8	(South Korea) Se-ri Pak	67-72=139	−5
T8	(Philippines) Jennifer Rosales	69-70=139	−5
T8	(United States) Angela Stanford	69-70=139	−5

Amateurs: Brewerton (+2), Weeks (+11)

=== Third round ===
Saturday, 10 August 2002

Place	Player	Score	To par
T1	(Sweden) Carin Koch	68-68-68=204	−12
T1	(Philippines) Jennifer Rosales	69-70-65=204	−12
T3	(United States) Natalie Gulbis	69-70-67=206	−10
T3	(Spain) Paula Martí	69-68-69=206	−10
T5	(United States) Tina Barrett	67-70-70=207	−9
T5	(United States) Beth Bauer	70-67-70=207	−9
T5	(Australia) Michelle Ellis	69-70-68=207	−9
T5	(Taiwan) Candie Kung	65-71-71=207	−9
T5	(Australia) Karrie Webb	66-71-70=207	−9
T10	(United States) Pat Hurst	69-70-69=208	−8
T10	(South Korea) Jeong Jang	73-69-66=208	−8
T10	(United States) Meg Mallon	69-71-68=208	−8
T10	(Sweden) Catrin Nilsmark	70-69-69=208	−8
T10	(South Korea) Se-ri Pak	67-72-69=208	−8
T10	(United States) Angela Stanford	69-70-69=208	−8

=== Final round ===
Sunday, 11 August 2002

Place	Player	Score	To par	Money ($)
1	(Australia) Karrie Webb	66-71-70-66=273	−15	236,383
T2	(Australia) Michelle Ellis	69-70-68-68=275	−13	129,629
T2	(Spain) Paula Martí	69-68-69-69=275	−13	129,629
T4	(South Korea) Jeong Jang	73-69-66-69=277	−11	64,528
T4	(Taiwan) Candie Kung	65-71-71-70=277	−11	64,528
T4	(Sweden) Catrin Nilsmark	70-69-69-69=277	−11	64,528
T4	(Philippines) Jennifer Rosales	69-70-65-73=277	−11	64,528
T8	(United States) Beth Bauer	70-67-70-71=278	−10	38,380
T8	(Sweden) Carin Koch	68-68-68-74=278	−10	38,380
T8	(United States) Meg Mallon	69-71-68-70=278	−10	38,380

==== Scorecard ====
Final round

Hole	1	2	3	4	5	6	7	8	9	10	11	12	13	14	15	16	17	18
Par	4	4	5	3	4	3	5	4	4	4	3	4	4	5	3	4	5	4
(Australia) Webb	−9	−9	−10	−10	−11	−12	−12	−12	−12	−13	−13	−14	−14	−14	−14	−14	−15	−15
(Australia) Ellis	−9	−9	−9	−8	−9	−9	−10	−11	−10	−10	−9	−10	−10	−10	−11	−11	−12	−13
(Spain) Martí	−10	−10	−10	−10	−10	−10	−10	−11	−12	−12	−12	−12	−12	−11	−12	−12	−13	−13
(Philippines) Rosales	−12	−12	−12	−12	−12	−11	−12	−12	−11	−10	−10	−10	−10	−10	−10	−11	−11	−11
(Sweden) Koch	−12	−12	−12	−12	−12	−12	−12	−11	−12	−12	−12	−11	−10	−10	−10	−10	−10	−10

Cumulative tournament scores, relative to par
