= 2011 Legends Tour =

The 2011 Legends Tour was a series of professional golf tour events for women aged 45 and older sanctioned by the Legends Tour. Based in the United States, it is an offshoot of the main U.S.-based women's tour, the LPGA Tour. The tour was founded in 2001, and is intended to allow women to prolong their competitive golf careers on the model of the successful Champions Tour for men.

== Schedule and results ==
The 2011 Legends Tour consisted of five events. The number in brackets after each winner's name is the number of Legends Tour events she had won up to and including that tournament.

Dates	Tournament	Location	Winner
May 1	Women's Senior National Invitational	Arizona	(United States) Laurie Rinker (1)
May 21–22	Handa Cup	New Hampshire	United States
Jun 4–5	Patty Sheehan & Friends Legends Tour Event	Nevada	(United States) Christa Johnson (4)
Aug 7	Wendy's Charity Challenge	Michigan	(Canada) Lorie Kane (1)
Nov 12–13	Legends Tour Open Championship	Florida	(United States) Michele Redman (1)
