= 2013 Legends Tour =

The 2013 Legends Tour was a series of professional golf tour events for women aged 45 and older sanctioned by the Legends Tour. Based in the United States, it is an offshoot of the main U.S.-based women's tour, the LPGA Tour. The tour was founded in 2001, and is intended to allow women to prolong their competitive golf careers on the model of the successful Champions Tour for men.

== Schedule and results ==
In 2013, the Legends Tour had its most prolific season to date with 10 events on the schedule. The number in brackets after each winner's name is the number of Legends Tour events she had won up to and including that tournament.

Dates	Tournament	Location	Winner
Feb 23–24	Walgreens Charity Classic	Arizona	(United States) Michele Redman (2)
Mar 9	Fry's Desert Golf Classic	Arizona	(United States) Betsy King (1) & Jane Crafter (1)
Apr 29–30	Walgreens Charity Championship	Florida	(United States) Nancy Scranton (5)
Jul 13	Judson Collegiate & Legends Pro-Am Challenge	Georgia	(Peru) Alicia Dibos (2)
Jul 28	LPGA Legends Swing for the Cure	Washington	(United States) Sherri Turner (3)
Aug 11	Wendy's Charity Challenge	Michigan	(United States) Sherri Steinhauer (2)
Sep 14–15	Harris Golf Charity Classic	Maine	(United States) Rosie Jones (6)
Sep 27–29	The Legends Championship	Indiana	(Canada) Lorie Kane (2)
Oct 12–13	ISPS Handa Cup	Tennessee	World Team
Nov 9–10	ISPS Handa Legends Tour Open Championship	Florida	(United States) Laurie Rinker (2)
