= Kate Golden =

American professional golfer (born 1967)

Personal information
- Nationality: United States
- Born: February 9, 1967 (age 59) Beaumont, Texas, U.S.
- Height: 5 ft 5 in (1.65 m)

Career
- Sport: Golf
- College: University of Texas
- Turned professional: 1989
- Former tours: LPGA Tour (1992–2008); Futures Tour (1989–1990)
- Professional wins: 1

Number of wins by tour
- LPGA Tour: 1

Best results in LPGA major championships
- Chevron Championship: T40: 2004
- Women's PGA C'ship: T6: 2003
- U.S. Women's Open: T20: 2004
- du Maurier Classic: T40: 1999
- Women's British Open: CUT: 2003, 2007

Kate Golden (born February 9, 1967) is an American professional golfer who played on the LPGA Tour.

Golden played college golf at the University of Texas where she was an All-American. She graduated in 1989 with a degree in Criminal Justice.

Golden competed on the Futures Tour in 1989 and 1990. She joined the LPGA Tour in 1992. She won once at the 2001 State Farm Classic, shooting 63 in the final round and beating Annika Sörenstam by 1 shot. After her playing days, Golden became a coach. She is now the women's assistant coach at her alma mater.

== Professional wins ==
=== LPGA Tour wins (1) ===
No.	Date	Tournament	Winning score	Margin of victory	Runner-up
1	Sep 2, 2001	State Farm Classic	–21 (69-65-70-63=267)	1 stroke	(Sweden) Annika Sörenstam
