= ADT Championship =

Golf tournament formerly on the LPGA Tour

The ADT Championship was a women's professional golf tournament on the U.S.-based LPGA Tour. The season-ending event on the tour, it became the LPGA Playoffs at The ADT from 2006 through 2008.

== History ==
The tournament was played in its final playoff form for the first time in November 2006; the champion of the event, Julieta Granada, won $1 million, the highest first-place prize in the history of women's golf. The event took place at the Trump International Golf Club in West Palm Beach, Florida.

From 1996 through 2005 the tournament was a standard, 72-hole stroke play event. It had a purse of $1,000,000 in its final season, with a winner's share of $215,000.

The playoff event in 2006 was the first time golf has ever used a postseason of any kind on any tour. Beginning in 2007, the PGA Tour also employed a playoff system.

Through the 2008 season, the title sponsor was ADT, a worldwide supplier of electronic security and fire alarm systems, communication systems and integrated building management systems, with headquarters in Boca Raton, Florida.

== Successors ==
On October 16, 2008 it was announced ADT would not extend its sponsorship. Another entirely new tournament, the LPGA Tour Championship, took ADT's place on the LPGA schedule for two years in 2009 and 2010; it was succeeded by the CME Group Titleholders in 2011

== Selection process ==
=== 2008 selection ===
As in the two previous seasons, the 2008 season was split into two halves, with 15 players from each half qualifying for the ADT Championship using a performance-based points system. In addition, two wild card players were chosen at the end of the regular season; a total of 32 players competed in the ADT Championship.

The first half began with the SBS Open at Turtle Bay and ended with the LPGA Championship. The second half began with the Wegmans LPGA and ended with the Lorena Ochoa Invitational, one week before the Playoffs.

LPGA members qualified for the ADT Championship by accumulating ADT Points during each half of the season or by winning an automatic entry by winning one of 13 designated "winner" events—defined as any event with a purse of at least $2 million—throughout the season. The two wild cards were the top two players from the LPGA Official Money List who were not otherwise qualified after the Lorena Ochoa Invitational: Sun Young Yoo and Christina Kim.

=== 2007 selection ===
The selection process in the 2007 LPGA regular season was the same as in 2008, with the only differences being:

- The first half ended with the Wegmans LPGA.
- The second half began with the US Women's Open and ended at The Mitchell Company Tournament of Champions, one week before the Playoffs.
- Only 10 "winner" events were held during the season.

More details on selecting competitors for the 2007 Playoffs can be found at: LPGA.com.

=== 2006 selection ===
The 2006 LPGA campaign was split into two halves. The first half began with the SBS Open at Turtle Bay and ended with the Jamie Farr Owens Corning Classic. The second half began with the Evian Masters and ended with The Mitchell Company Tournament of Champions, one week before the Playoffs. The top 15 points scorers and one wild card from each half qualified for the Playoffs, making for a total of 32 players who will take part in the season-ending event.

Most of the events on 2006 LPGA schedule were "points" events, in which the top twenty finishers were awarded points. In addition, all winners of the LPGA's majors and five limited field events, such as the HSBC Women's World Match Play Championship, automatically qualified for the Playoffs.

Once the first half ended, and the first 16 players were awarded spots in the Playoffs, the point totals from the first half were wiped out, and the second half began with a fresh scoresheet, meaning points did not carry over from half-to-half.

More details on selecting competitors for the 2006 Playoffs can be found at: LPGA.com.

== 2008 qualifiers ==
=== First half qualifiers ===
1. (Mexico) Lorena Ochoa: won the HSBC Women's Champions (also won the Kraft Nabisco Championship, the Ginn Open, and the Sybase Classic)
2. (Sweden) Annika Sörenstam: won the Stanford International Pro-Am (also won the Michelob ULTRA Open at Kingsmill)
3. (South Korea) Seon Hwa Lee: won the Ginn Tribute Hosted by ANNIKA
4. (Taiwan) Yani Tseng: won the McDonald's LPGA Championship
5. (United States) Paula Creamer: 923,742 points
6. (South Korea) Jeong Jang: 664,249 points
7. (South Korea) Song-Hee Kim: 509,000 points
8. (Australia) Karrie Webb: 505,867 points
9. (Norway) Suzann Pettersen: 484,664 points
10. (South Korea) Na Yeon Choi: 464,709 points
11. (Sweden) Maria Hjorth: 422,446 points
12. (England) Karen Stupples: 378,342 points
13. (South Korea) Jee Young Lee: 375,695 points
14. (South Korea) Inbee Park: 368,124 points
15. (United States) Laura Diaz: 367,228 points

=== Second half qualifiers ===
1. (South Korea) Eun-Hee Ji: won the Wegmans LPGA
2. (Sweden) Helen Alfredsson: won the Evian Masters
3. (South Korea) Jiyai Shin: won the Women's British Open
4. (Australia) Katherine Hull: won the Canadian Women's Open
5. (United States) Cristie Kerr: 848,850 points
6. (United States) Angela Stanford: 764,706 points
7. (Brazil) Angela Park: 667,346 points
8. (South Korea) In-Kyung Kim: 625,780 points
9. (Taiwan) Candie Kung: 582,429 points
10. (South Korea) Hee-Won Han: 548,572 points
11. (South Korea) Ji Young Oh: 469,308 points
12. (China) Shanshan Feng: 452,236 points
13. (United States) Morgan Pressel: 416,137 points
14. (South Korea) Meena Lee: 378,254 points
15. (United States) Nicole Castrale: 365,501 points

Inbee Park, who won the U.S. Women's Open, qualified via first-half points.

=== Wild cards ===
1. (South Korea) Sun Young Yoo: $674,983
2. (United States) Christina Kim: $664,598

== 2007 qualifiers ==
=== First half qualifiers ===
1. (United States) Morgan Pressel: won the Kraft Nabisco Championship
2. (United States) Brittany Lincicome: won the Ginn Open
3. (Norway) Suzann Pettersen: won the Michelob ULTRA Open at Kingsmill (also won the LPGA Championship)
4. (United States) Nicole Castrale: won the Ginn Tribute Hosted by Annika
5. (Mexico) Lorena Ochoa: 1,524,404 points
6. (United States) Paula Creamer: 685,729 points
7. (South Korea) Mi Hyun Kim: 647,110 points
8. (South Korea) Sarah Lee: 580,948 points
9. (United States) Stacy Prammanasudh: 552,707 points
10. (South Korea) Jee Young Lee: 521,842 points
11. (Australia) Karrie Webb: 407,786 points
12. (United States) Cristie Kerr: 395,180 points
13. (Brazil) Angela Park: 375,519 points
14. (United States) Juli Inkster: 372,980 points
15. (United States) Angela Stanford: 367,855 points

=== Second half qualifiers ===
1. (South Korea) Seon Hwa Lee: won the HSBC Women's World Match Play Championship
2. (United States) Natalie Gulbis: won the Evian Masters
3. (Sweden) Maria Hjorth: 756,904 points
4. (South Korea) Jeong Jang: 748,129 points
5. (South Korea) Se Ri Pak: 490,656 points
6. (United States) Christina Kim: 434,742 points
7. (Japan) Ai Miyazato: 427,108 points
8. (England) Laura Davies: 354,785 points
9. (South Korea) Inbee Park: 349,906 points
10. (United States) Laura Diaz: 326,537 points
11. (Sweden) Annika Sörenstam: 325,940 points
12. (United States) Sherri Steinhauer: 302,618 points
13. (South Korea) Shi Hyun Ahn: 292,816 points
14. (United States) Reilley Rankin: 281,929 points
15. (Sweden) Sophie Gustafson: 264,607 points

The remaining three "winner" events in the second half were won by golfers who had already qualified via first-half points—the U.S. Women's Open by Cristie Kerr, and the Women's British Open and Canadian Women's Open by Lorena Ochoa.

=== Wild cards ===
1. (Scotland) Catriona Matthew: $504,366
2. (United States) Meaghan Francella: $499,292

== Current format ==
- Round 1: All 32 players compete in pairs of two.
- Round 2: All 32 players compete, re-paired in pairs of two with those with the highest scores from Round 1 starting earliest and those with the lowest scores starting latest in the day. At the end of the Round 2, the 16 players with the lowest cumulative scores from Rounds 1 and 2 continue to Round 3. The other 16 players are eliminated from the tournament. In the event of a tie a sudden-death playoff takes place.
- Round 3: The remaining 16 players compete in pairs of two. Scores are wiped clean for all players, however starting position is determined by the cumulative score from Rounds 1 and 2, with the players with the highest scores starting earliest in the day and the players with the lowest scores starting latest. The eight players with the lowest scores at the end of Round 3 advance to Round 4. If a tie exists, it is settled with a sudden-death playoff.
- Round 4: The remaining eight players compete in pairs of two. The players participate in a live draw where they pick which time slot they would like to play in with the first pick going to the low score and the final pick going to the high score. The player with the lowest score after Round 4 wins $1 million. As in previous rounds, ties are settled with a sudden-death playoff.

== Controversy surrounding $1 million prize ==
Most players have supported the tournament, though some criticism has been raised. Annika Sörenstam, for example, commented that a player who had a great year, like Sörenstam did in 2005, when she won 10 times, could miss the cut after round three, and not only lose the tournament, but also the title given to the player who tops the LPGA Money List for the year to someone not even in the List's top 10 at the event's start.

Sörenstam, as well as others, have suggested that only half the prize count toward the money list, while the other half be given as a bonus, and not counted on the money list. The LPGA said it would consider this before the 2007 event. No change was made for 2007.

== Possible revival of the ADT Championship? ==
On November 21, 2009, Golf Channel's Randall Mell reported in a blog post that the LPGA was in preliminary discussions to bring back the tournament in 2011.

== Winners ==
=== LPGA Playoffs at The ADT ===
| Year | Dates | Champion | Country | Score | Tournament Location | Purse ($) | Winner's share ($) |
|---|---|---|---|---|---|---|---|
| 2008 | Nov 20–23 | Jiyai Shin | South Korea | 69-75-71-**70** | Trump International Golf Club | 1,550,000 | 1,000,000 |
| 2007 | Nov 15–18 | Lorena Ochoa | Mexico | 70-70-66-**68** | Trump International Golf Club | 1,550,000 | 1,000,000 |
| 2006 | Nov 16–19 | Julieta Granada | Paraguay | 70-69-69-**68** | Trump International Golf Club | 1,550,000 | 1,000,000 |

The total tournament score is not shown because that does not determine the winner. Championship round score is shown in bold.

=== ADT Championship ===
Tournament names through the years:

- 1996–1997: **ITT LPGA Tour Championship**
- 1998: **PageNet Tour Championship**
- 1999: **PageNet Championship**
- 2000: **Arch Wireless Championship**
- 2001: **Tyco/ADT Championship**
- 2002–2005: **ADT Championship**

| Year | Dates | Champion | Country | Score | Tournament Location | Purse ($) | Winner's share ($) |
|---|---|---|---|---|---|---|---|
| 2005 | Nov 17–20 | Annika Sörenstam | Sweden | 282 (−6) | Trump International Golf Club | 1,000,000 | 215,000 |
| 2004 | Nov 18–21 | Annika Sörenstam | Sweden | 275 (−13) | Trump International Golf Club | 1,000,000 | 215,000 |
| 2003 | Nov 20–23 | Meg Mallon | United States | 281 (−7) | Trump International Golf Club | 1,000,000 | 215,000 |
| 2002 | Nov 21–24 | Annika Sörenstam | Sweden | 275 (−13) | Trump International Club | 1,000,000 | 215,000 |
| 2001 | Nov 15–18 | Karrie Webb | Australia | 279 (−9) | Trump International Club | 1,000,000 | 215,000 |
| 2000 | Nov 16–19 | Dottie Pepper | United States | 279 (−9) | LPGA International Legends Course | 1,000,000 | 215,000 |
| 1999 | Nov 11–14 | Se Ri Pak | South Korea | 276 (−12) | Desert Inn Golf Club | 1,000,000 | 215,000 |
| 1998 | Nov 19–22 | Laura Davies | England | 277 (−11) | Desert Inn Golf Club | 1,000,000 | 215,000 |
| 1997 | Nov 20–23 | Annika Sörenstam | Sweden | 277 (−11) | Desert Inn Golf Club | 750,000 | 160,000 |
| 1996 | Nov 21–24 | Karrie Webb | Australia | 272 (−16) | Desert Inn Golf Club | 700,000 | 150,000 |

== Tournament record ==
| Year | Player | Score | Round | Course |
|---|---|---|---|---|
| 1997 | Pat Hurst | 64 (−8) | 2nd | Desert Inn Golf Club, par 72 |
| 2006 | Il Mi Chung | 65 (−7) | 3rd | Trump International Golf Club, par 72 |
| 2006 | Mi Hyun Kim | 65 (−7) | 3rd | Trump International Golf Club, par 72 |
| 2007 | Morgan Pressel | 65 (−7) | 2nd | Trump International Golf Club, par 72 |
