= Wendy Doolan =

Australian professional golfer (born 1968)

Personal information
- Nationality: Australia
- Born: 16 December 1968 (age 57) Sydney, Australia
- Height: 5 ft 5 in (1.65 m)

Career
- Sport: Golf
- Turned professional: 1991
- Former tours: LPGA Tour; ALPG Tour
- Professional wins: 5

Number of wins by tour
- LPGA Tour: 3
- WPGA Tour of Australasia: 1
- Epson Tour: 1

Best results in LPGA major championships
- Chevron Championship: T9: 2005
- Women's PGA C'ship: T8: 2004
- U.S. Women's Open: T7: 2001
- du Maurier Classic: T32: 1996
- Women's British Open: T18: 2002

Wendy Doolan (born 16 December 1968) is a former Australian professional golfer who played mainly on the U.S.-based LPGA Tour.

== Early life and amateur career ==
In 1968, Doolan was born in Sydney, Australia. She started playing golf at the age of 14.

In 1991, she was runner-up at the British Ladies Amateur.

== Professional career ==
In 1991, she turned professional. In the early years of her career, Doolan played in Asia and Europe and on the second tier Futures Tour in the United States.

She tied for 21st at the 1995 LPGA Final Qualifying Tournament and has played on the LPGA Tour from 1996 to 2012. Her three victories on the tour came at the 2001 LPGA Champions Classic, the 2003 Welch's/Fry's Championship, and the 2004 Evian Masters. The Evian Masters, which is played in France, is the second richest event in women's golf after the U.S. Women's Open, and is recognised as a major championship by the Ladies European Tour. Her best finish in an LPGA major is a tie for seventh place at the 2001 U.S. Women's Open.

Doolan announced her retirement from competitive golf on 10 August 2012. Doolan became a golf teacher after leaving the touring scene.

== Professional wins (5) ==
=== LPGA Tour wins (3) ===
No.	Date	Tournament	Winning score	Margin of victory	Runner(s)-up
1	20 May 2001	LPGA Champions Classic	−12 (68-64=132)^{1}	Playoff	(United States) Wendy Ward
2	16 Mar 2003	Welch's/Fry's Championship	−21 (65-62-67-65=259)	3 strokes	(Canada) Lorie Kane (United States) Betsy King
3	24 Jul 2004	Evian Masters	−18 (68-68-69-65=265)	1 stroke	(Sweden) Annika Sörenstam

^{1}The 2001 LPGA Champions Classic was shortened to 36 holes due to inclement weather.

LPGA Tour playoff record (1–0)

No.	Year	Tournament	Opponent	Result
1	2001	LPGA Champions Classic	(United States) Wendy Ward	Won with birdie on fifth extra hole

=== ALPG Tour wins (1) ===
- 1992 Heart Health Victorian Women's Open

=== Futures Tour wins (1) ===
- 1992 Inaugural C.C. of Ozark FUTURES Classic

== Team appearances ==
Amateur

- Espirito Santo Trophy (representing Australia): 1990
- Commonwealth Trophy (representing Australia): 1991
- Queen Sirikit Cup (representing Australia): 1990, 1991

Professional

- Handa Cup (representing World team): 2014, 2015
