= Michele Redman =

American professional golfer (born 1965)

Personal information
- Nationality: United States
- Born: April 15, 1965 (age 61) Zanesville, Ohio, U.S.
- Height: 5 ft 8 in (1.73 m)

Career
- Sport: Golf
- College: Indiana University Bloomington
- Turned professional: 1988
- Former tours: LPGA Tour (1992–2011); Futures Tour (1988–1991)
- Professional wins: 8

Number of wins by tour
- LPGA Tour: 2
- Epson Tour: 3
- Other: 3

Best results in LPGA major championships
- Chevron Championship: T4: 2000
- Women's PGA C'ship: T6: 2002
- U.S. Women's Open: T5: 2004
- du Maurier Classic: T13: 1999
- Women's British Open: T5: 2004

Michele Redman (born April 15, 1965) is an American professional golfer who played on the LPGA Tour from 1992 through 2011. She is currently the women's golf coach at the University of Minnesota.

== Early life and amateur career ==
In 1965, Redman was born in Zanesville, Ohio. She attended Zanesville High School where she played on the varsity boys' golf team.

Redman attended Indiana University Bloomington where she won four events and was named All-American twice and All-Big Ten four times. She was the Big Ten Conference champion in 1987.

== Professional career ==
Redman played on the Futures Tour from 1988 to 1991, winning three times in 1991.

Redman played on the LPGA Tour from 1992 through 2011 and had two victories: the 1997 JAL Big Apple Classic and the 2000 First Union Betsy King Classic. She had her best finish on the money list in 2000, placing tenth. She was a member of the U.S. Solheim Cup team in 2000, 2002, 2003 and 2005.

Before Redman's successful fourth attempt to make the LPGA tour, she played on the Futures Tour where she posted three victories. Redman has two holes-in-one and has won over $4.5 million.

On August 10, 2011, it was announced that Redman would be the next women's golf coach at the University of Minnesota. At the 2011 Safeway Classic, Redman announced her retirement from competing on the LPGA Tour.

On November 13, 2011, Redman won the 2011 Legends Tour Open Championship.

== Awards and honors ==
- While at Indiana University, Redman earned All-American honors twice and All-Big Ten four times.
- In 2001, Redman was inducted into the Indiana University Athletic Hall of Fame.

== Professional wins (8) ==
=== LPGA Tour wins (2) ===
No.	Date	Tournament	Winning score	Margin of victory	Runner(s)-up
1	Jul 20, 1997	JAL Big Apple Classic	-12 (64-67-71-70=272)	3 strokes	(Sweden) Annika Sörenstam
2	Sep 10, 2000	First Union Betsy King Classic	-14 (68-66-68=202)	3 strokes	(United States) Jean Bartholomew (United States) Meg Mallon

LPGA Tour playoff record (0–1)

No.	Year	Tournament	Opponents	Result
1	2009	Safeway Classic	(South Korea) M.J. Hur (Norway) Suzann Pettersen	Hur won with birdie on second extra hole Redman eliminated by par on first hole.

=== Futures Tour wins (3) ===
- 1991 Chattanooga FUTURES Classic, Marriott's Griffin Gate FUTURES Classic, Charleston F.O.P. FUTURES Golf Classic

=== Legends Tour wins (3) ===
No.	Date	Tournament	Winning score	Margin of victory	Runner(s)-up
1	Nov 13, 2011	Legends Tour Open Championship	−2 (72-70=142)	2 strokes	(United States) Rosie Jones
2	Feb 24, 2013	Walgreens Charity Classic	−5 (71-68=139)	2 strokes	(Canada) Lorie Kane
3	Sep 6, 2019	BJ's Charity Championship (with Rosie Jones)	−12 (59)	2 strokes	(Peru) (Sweden) Jenny Lidback & (Peru) Alicia Dibos

== Results in LPGA majors ==
Tournament	1992	1993	1994	1995	1996	1997	1998	1999	2000
Kraft Nabisco Championship					T54		T42	T13	T4
LPGA Championship	T64	CUT	CUT	T29	T41	CUT	T18	CUT	T17
U.S. Women's Open		T22	CUT	20	T14	T7	T49	T14	T23
du Maurier Classic	CUT	CUT	T31	T25	T23	T41	T14	T13	T24

Tournament	2001	2002	2003	2004	2005	2006	2007	2008	2009	2010	2011
Kraft Nabisco Championship	T18	T25	T21	22	T58	T11	T65	T21	T12	T48	CUT
LPGA Championship	T10	T6	T11	CUT	T49	T39	T46	T58	T31	T42	T34
U.S. Women's Open	T16	T22	T39	T5	CUT	CUT	CUT	70	T40	CUT	CUT
Women's British Open ^	CUT		T37	T5	T11	CUT	T42		T17		

^ The Women's British Open replaced the du Maurier Classic as an LPGA major in 2001.

Top 10
Did not play

CUT = missed the half-way cut.
"T" = tied

=== Summary ===
- Starts – 70
- Wins – 0
- 2nd-place finishes – 0
- 3rd-place finishes – 0
- Top 3 finishes – 0
- Top 5 finishes – 3
- Top 10 finishes – 6
- Top 25 finishes – 30
- Missed cuts – 16
- Most consecutive cuts made – 10
- Longest streak of top-10s – 2

== Team appearances ==
Professional

- Solheim Cup (representing the United States): 2000, 2002 (winners), 2003, 2005 (winners)
- Handa Cup (representing the United States): 2011 (winners), 2015 (winners)
