= The Office Depot =

Golf tournament formerly on the LPGA Tour

The Office Depot was a golf tournament on the LPGA Tour from 1997 to 2001. It was played at Ibis Golf & Country Club in West Palm Beach, Florida from 1997 to 2000 and at the Doral Golf Resort & Spa in Miami, Florida in 2001.

== Winners ==
The Office Depot

- 2001 Grace Park
- 2000 Karrie Webb
- 1999 Karrie Webb
- 1998 Helen Alfredsson

Diet Dr Pepper National Pro-Am

- 1997 Kelly Robbins

== See also ==
- Office Depot Championship, another LPGA event
