= Chung Il-mi =

South Korean golfer

Il Mi Chung 정일미
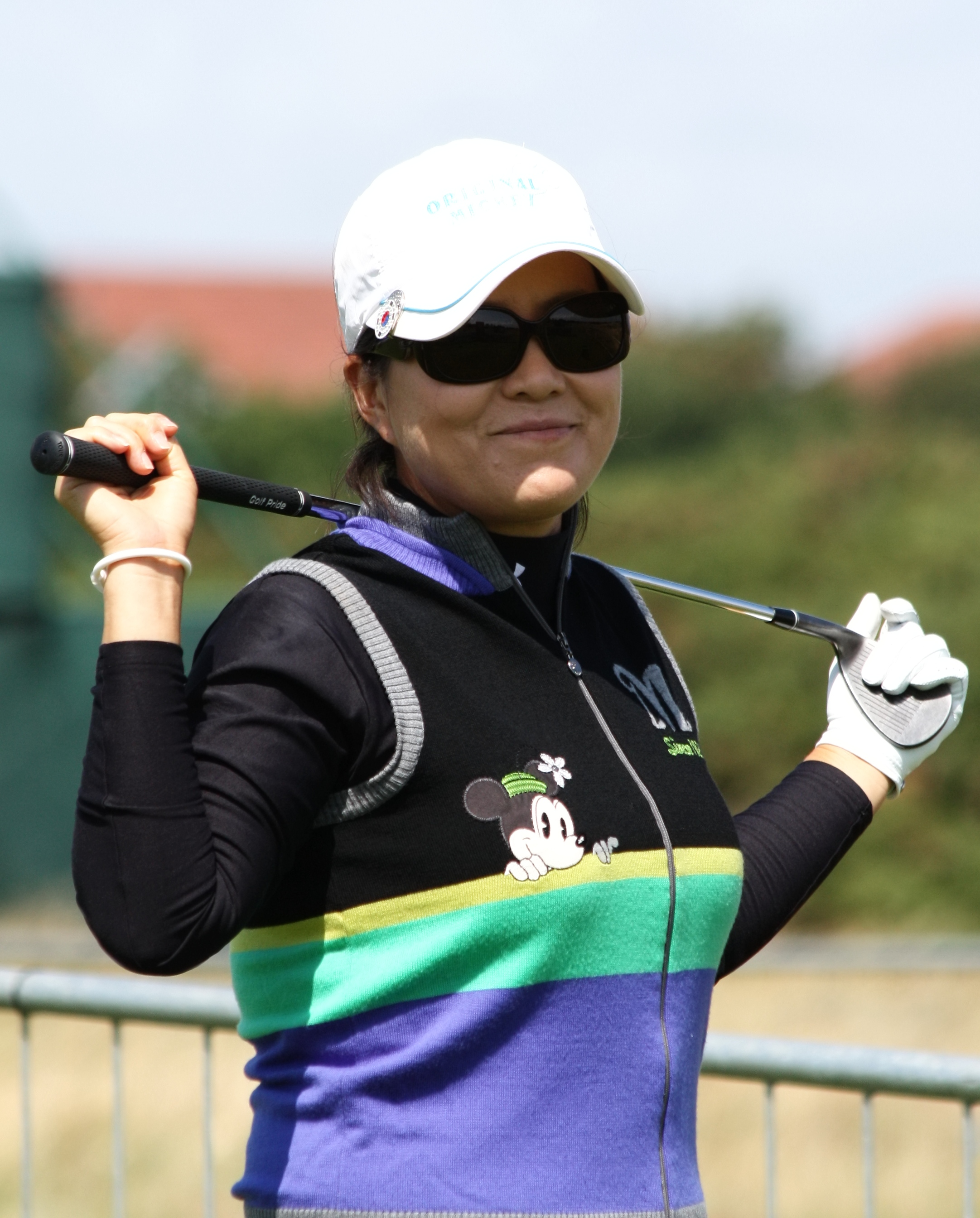
- Chung before 2009 Women's British Open

Personal information
- Nationality: South Korea
- Born: 15 January 1972 (age 54) Busan, South Korea
- Height: 1.65 m (5 ft 5 in)

Career
- Sport: Golf
- College: Ewha Womans University
- Turned professional: 1995
- Current tours: LPGA Tour (joined 2004); KLPGA (joined 1995)
- Professional wins: 9

Number of wins by tour
- LPGA of Korea Tour: 9

Best results in LPGA major championships
- Chevron Championship: T35: 2006
- Women's PGA C'ship: T25: 2005
- U.S. Women's Open: T25: 2007
- du Maurier Classic: DNP
- Women's British Open: T16: 2006

- Chung Il-mi
- Hangul: 정일미
- RR: Jeong Ilmi
- MR: Chŏng Ilmi

Chung Il-mi, or Il-Mi Chung (Korean: 정일미; born 15 January 1972) is a South Korean professional golfer.

== Career ==
She was born in Busan and attended Ewha Womans University.

She turned professional in 1995 and joined the LPGA of Korea Tour where she has eight wins. She qualified for the LPGA Tour via the 2003 LPGA Final Qualifying Tournament.

== Professional wins (9) ==
=== LPGA of Korea Tour wins (9) ===
- 1993 (1) **Korea Women's Open**
- 1997 (2) Tomboy Women's Open, Daily Women's Open
- 1999 (1) JP Cup Women's Open
- 2000 (2) SK EnClean Invitational, SBS Women's Professional Golf Challenge
- 2002 (2) **Korea Women's Open**, Hyundai Securities Women's Open
- 2003 (1) Kim Young Joo Golf Women's Open

Tournaments in bold denotes major tournaments in KLPGA.
