= Lorie Kane =

Canadian professional golfer (born 1964)

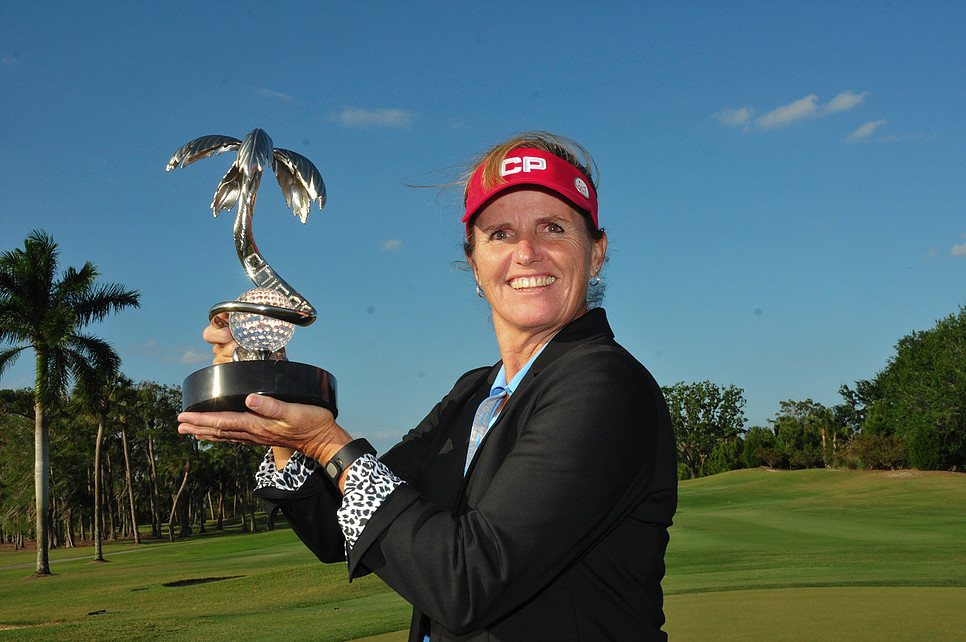
- Kane in 2016

Personal information
- Nationality: Canada
- Born: December 19, 1964 (age 61) Charlottetown, Prince Edward Island, Canada
- Height: 5 ft 6 in (168 cm)

Career
- Sport: Golf
- College: Acadia University
- Turned professional: 1993
- Former tour: LPGA Tour (joined 1996)
- Professional wins: 11

Number of wins by tour
- LPGA Tour: 4
- Other: 7

Best results in LPGA major championships
- Chevron Championship: 8th: 2005
- Women's PGA C'ship: T12: 2001
- U.S. Women's Open: 4th/T4: 1999, 2005
- du Maurier Classic: T5: 2000
- Women's British Open: T6: 2006
- Evian Championship: DNP

Achievements and awards
- LPGA Heather Farr Player Award: 1998
- LPGA William and Mousie Powell Award: 2000
- Canadian Golf Hall of Fame: 2015

Lorie Kane, CM (born December 19, 1964) is a Canadian professional golfer on the LPGA Tour. She began her career on the LPGA Tour in 1996 and has four career victories and 99 top-10 finishes on the tour. She won the Bobbie Rosenfeld Award in 2000 and became a member of the Order of Canada at a ceremony in December 2006. Kane was the second Canadian to have multiple wins on the LPGA circuit in one season, in 2000, after Sandra Post performed the feat twice, in 1978 and 1979. The next person to do so was Brooke Henderson, in 2016. In 2015, she was inducted into the Canadian Golf Hall of Fame. In May 2020, it was announced that she would be awarded the Order of Sport, marking her induction into Canada's Sports Hall of Fame as part of the class of 2020-2021.

Kane was born in Charlottetown, Prince Edward Island, Canada, and is a graduate of Acadia University in Wolfville, Nova Scotia.

== Amateur wins ==
- 1991 Mexico International Amateur Championship

== Professional wins (11) ==
=== LPGA Tour wins (4) ===
No.	Date	Tournament	Winning score	Margin of victory	Runner-up
1	Aug 6, 2000	Michelob Light Classic	−11 (68-66-71=205)	3 strokes	(United States) Kristi Albers
2	Oct 1, 2000	New Albany Golf Classic	−11 (74-67-68-68=277)	Playoff	(South Korea) Mi-Hyun Kim
3	Nov 5, 2000	Mizuno Classic	−12 (70-68-66=204)	Playoff	(Sweden) Sophie Gustafson
4	Feb 10, 2001	LPGA Takefuji Classic	−11 (70-69-66=205)	2 strokes	(Sweden) Annika Sörenstam

LPGA Tour playoff record (2–7)

No.	Year	Tournament	Opponent(s)	Result
1	1997	State Farm Rail Classic	(United States) Cindy Figg-Currier (United States) Kris Tschetter	Figg-Currier won with birdie on first extra hole
2	1997	ITT LPGA Tour Championship	(United States) Pat Hurst (Sweden) Annika Sörenstam	Sörenstam won with par on third extra hole Hurst eliminated by par on first hole
3	1999	Chick-fil-A Charity Championship	(Australia) Rachel Hetherington	Lost to birdie on first extra hole
4	1999	Japan Airlines Big Apple Classic	(United States) Sherri Steinhauer	Lost to birdie on fifth extra hole
5	2000	New Albany Golf Classic	(South Korea) Mi-Hyun Kim	Won with birdie on first extra hole
6	2000	Mizuno Classic	(Sweden) Sophie Gustafson	Won with birdie on first extra hole
7	2002	LPGA Takefuji Classic	(Sweden) Annika Sörenstam	Lost to birdie on first extra hole
8	2003	Giant Eagle LPGA Classic	(Philippines) Jennifer Rosales (Sweden) Annika Sörenstam (Australia) Rachel Teske	Teske won with birdie on third extra hole
9	2004	Safeway Classic	(South Korea) Hee-Won Han	Lost to birdie on first extra hole

=== Other wins (2) ===
- 2001 Hyundai Team Matches (with Janice Moodie)
- 2002 Hyundai Team Matches (with Janice Moodie)

=== Legends Tour wins (5) ===
No.	Date	Tournament	Winning score	Margin of victory	Runners-up
1	Aug 7, 2011	Wendy's Charity Challenge	−7 (65)	5 strokes	(United States) Rosie Jones, (United States) Kris Tschetter
2	Sep 28, 2013	The Legends Championship	−3 (71-70-72=213)	2 strokes	(United States) Laurie Rinker, (United States) Val Skinner
3	Apr 17, 2016	Chico's Patty Berg Memorial	−1 (72-71=143)	3 strokes	(Australia) (United States) Jane Crafter, (United States) Barb Mucha
4	May 9, 2016	Legends at Stoney Point	−1 (77)	1 stroke	(United States) Michelle McGann
5	Aug 6, 2018	Wendy's Charity Classic	−16	2 strokes	(United States) Christa Johnson

== Results in LPGA majors ==
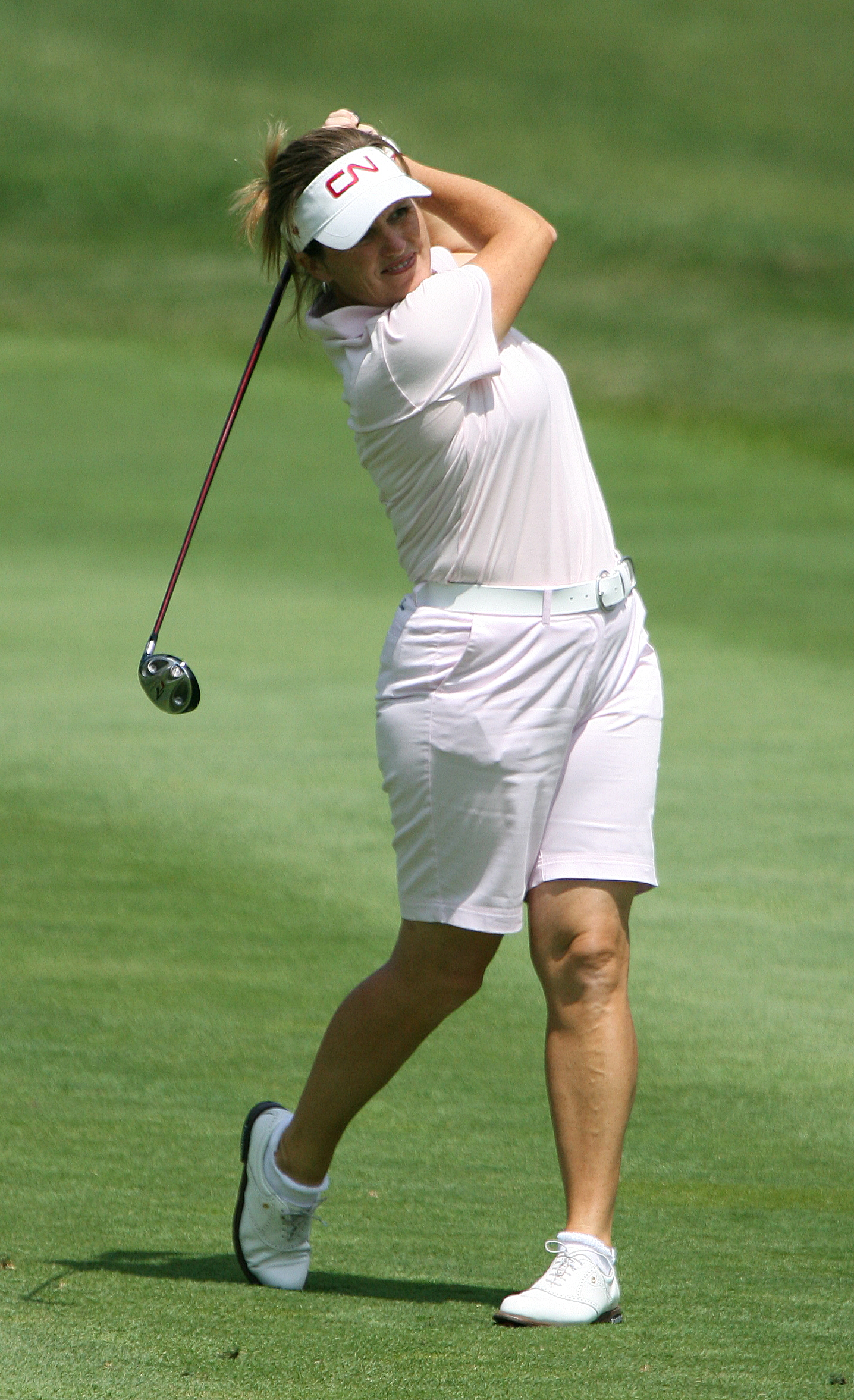
Kane at 2007 LPGA Championship

Tournament	1991	1992	1993	1994	1995	1996	1997	1998	1999	2000
Kraft Nabisco Championship								T18	T29	T35
LPGA Championship							T16	T30	T26	CUT
U.S. Women's Open							T48	T19	4	T17
du Maurier Classic ^	CUT	CUT	CUT	CUT	T67	T36	T30	CUT	T6	T5

Tournament	2001	2002	2003	2004	2005	2006	2007	2008	2009	2010
Kraft Nabisco Championship	T42	T9	T39	T35	8	T58	CUT			
LPGA Championship	T12	T33	T34	T49	T46	CUT	T62	T40	CUT	T64
U.S. Women's Open	T7	T18	T22	T29	T4	T24				CUT
Women's British Open	T46	CUT	T19	CUT	T58	T6	CUT			

Tournament	2011	2012	2013
Kraft Nabisco Championship		T79	
LPGA Championship	T57	CUT	T58
U.S. Women's Open		63	CUT
Women's British Open	T43	CUT	
The Evian Championship ^^			

^ The Women's British Open replaced the du Maurier Classic as an LPGA major in 2001.
^^ The Evian Championship was added as a major in 2013.

Top 10
Did not play

CUT = missed the half-way cut
"T" = tied

=== Summary ===
Tournament	Wins	2nd	3rd	Top-5	Top-10	Top-25	Events	Cuts made
Kraft Nabisco Championship	0	0	0	0	2	3	11	10
U.S. Women's Open	0	0	0	2	3	8	13	11
Women's PGA Championship	0	0	0	0	0	2	17	13
The Evian Championship	0	0	0	0	0	0	0	0
Women's British Open	0	0	0	0	1	2	9	5
du Maurier Classic	0	0	0	1	2	2	10	5
Totals	0	0	0	2	8	17	60	44

- Most consecutive cuts made – 9 (2000 U.S. Women's Open – 2002 U.S. Women's Open)
- Longest streak of top-10s – 2 (1999 U.S. Women's Open – 1999 du Maurier)

== Team appearances ==
Amateur

- Espirito Santo Trophy (representing Canada): 1992

Professional

- World Cup (representing Canada): 2005, 2006, 2008
- Handa Cup (representing World team): 2010, 2011, 2012 (tie), 2013 (winners), 2015
