= Annika Sörenstam =

Swedish professional golfer (born 1970)

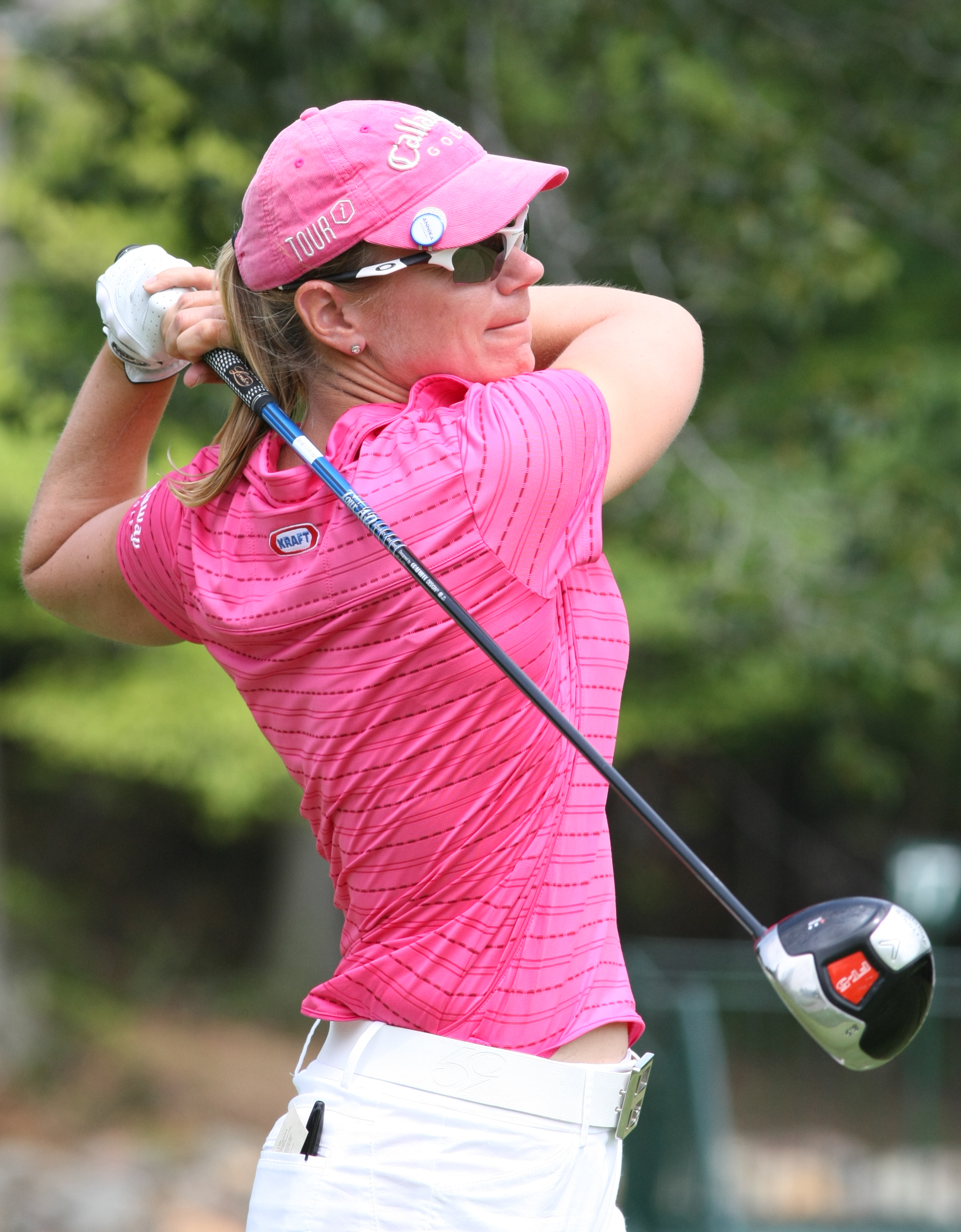
- Sörenstam at the 2008 LPGA Championship

Personal information
- Full name: Annika Charlotta Sörenstam
- Nationality: Sweden
- Born: 9 October 1970 (age 56) Bro, Stockholm County, Sweden
- Height: 5 ft 6 in (168 cm)
- Spouses: David Esch (m. 1997; div. 2005) Mike McGee (m. 2009)
- Children: 2

Career
- Sport: Golf
- College: University of Arizona (two years)
- Turned professional: 1992
- Current tours: LPGA Tour (joined 1994); Ladies European Tour
- Professional wins: 97

Number of wins by tour
- LPGA Tour: 72 (3rd all time)
- Ladies European Tour: 17 (5th all-time)
- LPGA of Japan Tour: 7
- WPGA Tour of Australasia: 4
- Other: 6 (regular); 1 (senior)

Best results in LPGA major championships (wins: 10)
- Chevron Championship: Won: 2001, 2002, 2005
- Women's PGA C'ship: Won: 2003, 2004, 2005
- U.S. Women's Open: Won: 1995, 1996, 2006
- du Maurier Classic: 2nd: 1998
- Women's British Open: Won: 2003

Achievements and awards
- World Golf Hall of Fame: 2003 (member page)
- LPGA Tour Rookie of the Year: 1994
- LPGA Tour Player of the Year: 1995, 1997, 1998, 2001, 2002, 2003, 2004, 2005
- LPGA Vare Trophy: 1995, 1996, 1998, 2001, 2002, 2005
- LPGA Tour Money Winner: 1995, 1997, 1998, 2001, 2002, 2003, 2004, 2005
- Ladies European Tour Rookie of the Year: 1993
- Ladies European Tour Order of Merit: 1995
- Ladies European Tour Player of the Year: 1995, 2002
- (For a full list of awards, see here)

Annika Charlotta Sörenstam (pronounced [ˈǎnːɪka ˈsœ̂ːrɛnˌstam]; born 9 October 1970) is a Swedish and American professional golfer regarded as one of the best female golfers in history. Before stepping away from competitive golf at the end of the 2008 season, she had won 96 international professional tournaments, making her the female golfer with the most wins to her name. She has won 72 official LPGA tournaments including ten majors and 24 other tournaments internationally.

In 2003, she joined an elite club, completing the career grand slam with victories at each of the four majors so recognized during her prime. Also in 2003, Sörenstam competed in the Bank of America Colonial tournament to become the first woman to play in a PGA Tour event since 1945.

Representing Europe in the Solheim Cup on eight occasions between 1994 and 2007, Sörenstam was the event's all-time leading points earner until her record was surpassed by England's Laura Davies during the 2011 Solheim Cup. Sörenstam also was captain of the 2017 European Solheim Cup team.

Despite retiring from regular tournament golf in 2008, as of the end of 2022, she still topped the LPGA's career money list with earnings of over $22 million—over $2 million ahead of her nearest rival while playing 187 fewer events. After turning 50, she came back from her retirement and added a win in the 2021 U.S. Senior Women's Open.

The winner of a record eight Player of the Year awards, and six Vare Trophies given to the LPGA player with the lowest seasonal scoring average, she still holds various all-time scoring records including the lowest season scoring average: 68.6969 in 2004. Sörenstam is the only female golfer to shoot a 59 in competition.

On 7 January 2021, she received the Presidential Medal of Freedom from President Donald Trump.

== Early life ==
She was born in Bro near Stockholm, Sweden. Sörenstam's father Tom was an IBM executive and her mother Gunilla worked in a bank. Her younger sister Charlotta also became a professional golfer and LPGA Tour winner, and, after her playing career, coached at her sister's academy. Annika and Charlotta Sörenstam became the first two sisters to both win $1 million on the LPGA Tour.

As a child, Sörenstam was a talented all-around athlete. She was a nationally ranked junior tennis player, played association football (soccer) for her hometown team and excelled in skiing to such an extent that the coach of the Swedish national ski team suggested the family move to northern Sweden to improve her skiing year round.

The Sörenstam family began playing golf at Viksjö Golf Club in Jakobsberg, north of Stockholm, and later switched to nearby Bro-Bålsta Golf Club, opened in 1980, initially with a 9-hole course. At the age of 12, Annika shared her first set of golf clubs with her sister. Annika got the odd numbered clubs and Charlotta the even - and earned her first handicap of 54.

At the European Tour tournament Scandinavian Enterprise Open in Stockholm in July 1986, she tried to be a volunteer caddie and was asked to stand in a line with all other candidates. When all male volunteer caddies finally had been chosen by the tournament professionals, three teen-age girls were left without a bag yet. It was Annika, Charlotta and Fanny Sunesson.

She was so shy as a junior, she used to deliberately three-putt at the end of a tournament to avoid giving the victory speech. The coaches noticed and at the next tournament both the winner and the runner-up had to give a speech. Sörenstam decided that if she were going to have to face the crowd anyway she might as well win and the deliberate misses stopped.

== Amateur career ==
Her successful amateur career included a win in the St Rule Trophy played at St Andrews and a runner-up finish in the Swedish national mother/daughter Championship. As a member of the Swedish National Team from 1987 to 1992, she played in the 1990 and 1992 Espirito Santo Trophy, winning the individual competition in 1992. While waiting to start college in Sweden, Sörenstam worked as a personal assistant at the PGA of Sweden and played on the Swedish Golf Tour, winning three tournaments during 1990/1991.

After a coach spotted Sörenstam playing in a collegiate event in Tokyo, she moved to the U.S. to play college golf at the University of Arizona in Tucson. She won seven collegiate titles and in 1991, became the first non-American and first freshman to win the individual NCAA Division I Championship. Sörenstam was 1991 NCAA Co-Player of the Year with Kelly Robbins, runner-up in the 1992 NCAA championship, 1992 Pac-10 champion and a 1991–92 NCAA All-American. She qualified for the U.S. Women's Open at Oakmont in July, made the cut, and tied for 63rd. A few weeks later at the U.S. Women's Amateur at Kemper Lakes near Chicago, she was the runner-up to Vicki Goetze, bogeying the last hole in the 36-hole final.

== Professional career ==
=== Ladies European Tour ===
Sörenstam turned professional in 1992, but missed her LPGA Tour card at the final qualifying tournament by one shot, and began her professional career on the Ladies European Tour (LET), formerly known as the WPGET. She was invited to play in three LPGA Tour events in 1993, where she finished T38th, 4th, and T9th, earning more than $47,000. She finished second four times on the Ladies European Tour and was 1993 Ladies European Tour Rookie of the Year. By tying for 28th at the LPGA Final Qualifying Tournament she earned non-exempt status for the 1994 season. Sörenstam's first professional win came at the 1994 Holden Women's Australian Open on the ALPG Tour.

=== LPGA Tour ===
In the United States, Sörenstam was LPGA Rookie of the Year, had three top-10 finishes including a tie for second at the Women's British Open and made her Solheim Cup debut. Her breakout year was 1995, when she won her first LPGA Tour title at the U.S. Women's Open. She finished at the top of the Money List and was the first non-American winner of the Vare Trophy. She became the second player ever to be Player of the Year and Vare Trophy winner the year after being Rookie of the Year. A win at the 1995 Australian Ladies Masters and two other wins on the Ladies European Tour put her top of the LET Order of Merit and made her the first player to top both the European and LPGA Tour money lists in the same season. Her success worldwide resulted in her winning the Jerringpriset award in Sweden, as well as being awarded the Svenska Dagbladet Gold Medal, the country's most prestigious award in sports.

1996 saw Sörenstam win her home LET tournament, the Trygg Hansa Ladies' Open in Sweden and three LPGA tournaments including the U.S. Women's Open. In defending her title, she became the first non-American to win back to back U.S. Women's Open titles, passed the $1 million mark in LPGA career earnings, and won her second consecutive Vare Trophy.

She won six tour events in 1997, regaining the money list and player of the year titles. Internationally, she won on the JLPGA and defended her home LET title at the renamed Compaq Open. She became the first player in LPGA history to finish a season with a sub-70 scoring average of 69.99 en route to retaining the 1998 Player of the Year and Money List titles as well as winning the LET Swedish tour stop for the third time running. September 1999 saw Sörenstam change her on-course team replacing her caddie of six years, Colin Cann, with Terry McNamara.

At this point in her career, Sörenstam says she lost focus having reached her biggest goals. Karrie Webb became the best LPGA Tour player but Sörenstam still managed to win more LPGA tournaments than any other LPGA Tour player during the 1990s. She qualified for the World Golf Hall of Fame when she won the 2000 Welch's/Circle K Championship, but was not eligible for induction until finishing her tenth year on the LPGA tour in October 2003. Sörenstam was the first international player to be inducted into the Hall of Fame through the LPGA criteria.

Having lost her preeminent position, Sörenstam embarked on a new five-day-a-week exercise program including weight-lifting and balance work which by 2003 added over 20 yards (18 m) to her driving distance. During the 2001 season, she had eight LPGA wins, became the only female golfer to shoot a 59 in competition and the first LPGA player to cross the $2 million mark in single-season earnings. She set or tied a total of 30 LPGA records en route to regaining the Vare Trophy and winning her fourth Player of the Year and Money List titles in 2001. In a made-for-TV alternate shot competition between the two best male and female players in the world, Sörenstam and Tiger Woods beat Karrie Webb and David Duval.

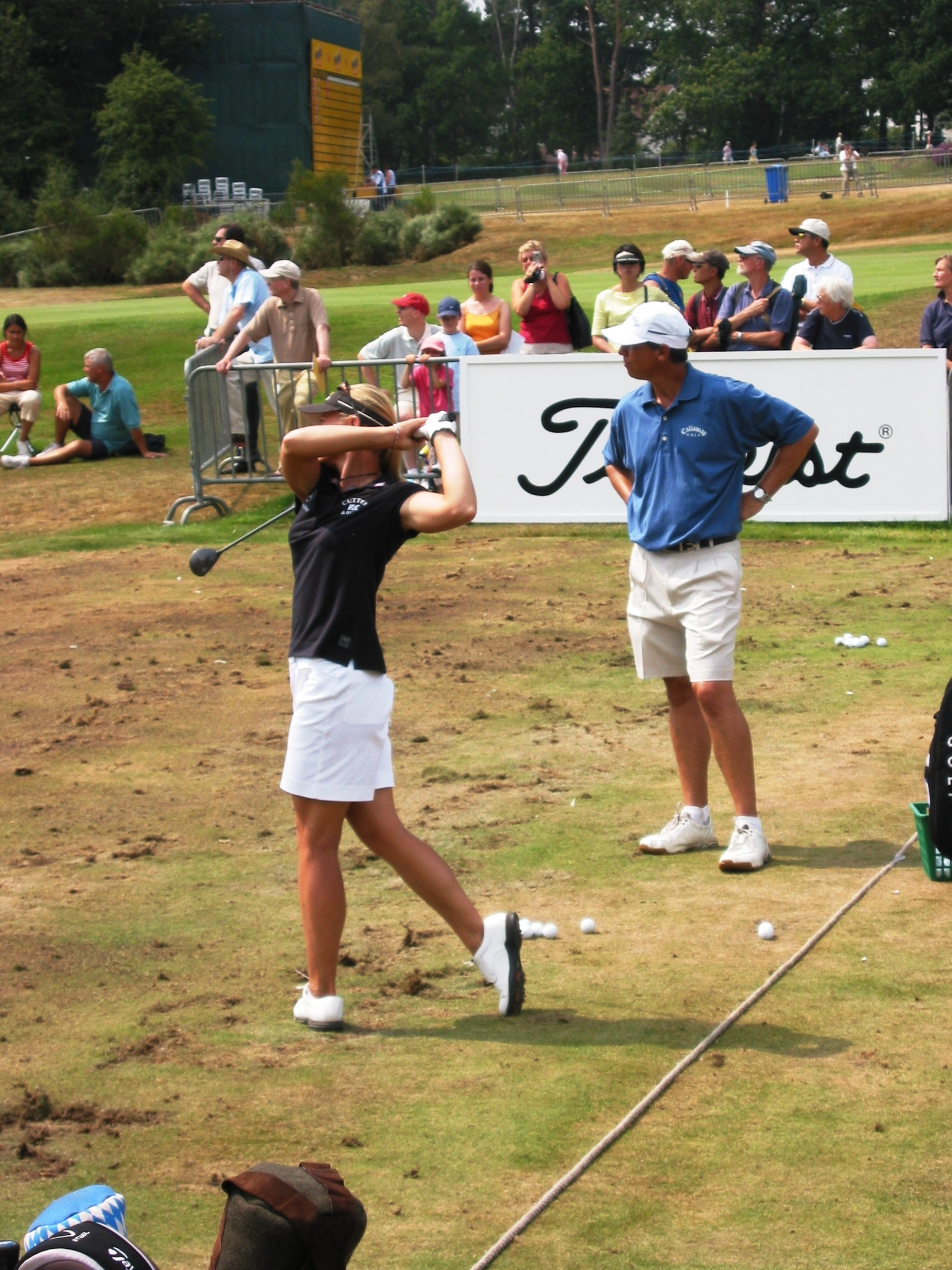
Sörenstam at the Women's British Open 2004

At the end of that season Karrie Webb said she "would eat her hat" if Sörenstam repeated her eight wins in 2002. Sörenstam accomplished that feat, joining Mickey Wright as the only players to win 11 LPGA tournaments in one season, earning her fifth Player of the Year title and fifth Vare Trophy. She successfully defended the Kraft Nabisco Championship, her fourth major victory, and also won the ANZ Ladies Masters in Australia and Compaq Open in Sweden on the Ladies European Tour giving her 13 wins in 25 starts worldwide in 2002.

Sörenstam was invited to play in the PGA Tour's Bank of America Colonial golf tournament in Fort Worth, Texas, in May 2003, making her the first woman to play in a PGA Tour event since Babe Zaharias, who qualified for the 1945 Los Angeles Open. Vijay Singh, fourth in the world rankings at the time, criticised her invitation, saying that she should have to qualify like the men and that he did not want to be beaten by a woman. Cheered through each hole, she shot five over par, tying for 96th out of the 111 who finished the first two rounds. After shooting 1-over-par 71 in the first round, finishing in 73rd and on pace to challenge for a weekend spot, Sörenstam said she was nervous all day but pleased by her performance. In the first round she led the field in driving accuracy, was in the top 20 in greens in regulation, and was 84th out of 111 in driving distance. Poor putting (last in the field, averaging over a two-putt) caused her to miss the cut.

Later in the 2003 season, she won the LPGA Championship and the Women's British Open, becoming only the sixth player to complete the LPGA Career Grand Slam, winning, at least once in her career, each of the four tournaments recognized as major championships during the main part of her career. Five years earlier, in 1998, she finished second in the fifth major at the time, du Maurier Classic, which she won in 2001, the first year when it was not recognized as a major tournament anymore. She had won the Evian Masters twice, in 2000 and 2002, before it became recognized as the fifth major from 2013, which was after Sörenstam's retirement in 2008.

She had five other victories worldwide in 2003, set or tied a total of 22 LPGA records and earned her sixth Player of the Year award. She competed against Fred Couples, Phil Mickelson and Mark O'Meara in the 2003 Skins Game, finishing second with five skins worth $225,000; Sörenstam holed a 39-yard (36 m) bunker shot on the ninth hole—the eighth eagle in Skins Game history. In September, she was part of the winning European Solheim Cup team in her native Sweden. She was awarded her second Jerringpriset award in Sweden plus the 2003 Golf Writers' Trophy by the Association of Golf Writers.

Sörenstam's dominance continued in 2004 with her seventh LPGA Player of the Year award tying Kathy Whitworth for the most in LPGA history. She posted 16 top-10 finishes in 18 LPGA starts, including eight wins, had two additional international wins, became the first player to reach $15 million in LPGA career earnings and took her own LPGA single-season scoring average record to 68.69696, but played too few rounds to win the Vare Trophy. The Women's Sports Foundation gave her the 2004 Sportswoman of the Year Award, and the Laureus World Sports Academy named her World Sportswoman of the Year. She also released a combination autobiography and golf instructional book, Golf Annika's Way.

Sörenstam's life both on and off the golf course changed in 2005. In February, she announced that she had filed for divorce from David Esch, her husband of eight years, and this was finalised in August but it did not adversely affect her golf. Her achievements included being the first player in LPGA history to win a major three consecutive years at the LPGA Championship and the first golfer in LPGA or PGA history to win the same event five consecutive years at the Mizuno Classic. 11 wins in 21 tournaments entered worldwide included victory in the Scandinavian TPC hosted by Annika where she presented herself the trophy, giving her an eighth Money List title, tying the LPGA record, an eighth Rolex Player of the Year (POY) award (a record) and a sixth Vare Trophy. She is the only LPGA player ever to win Money List, POY award and Vare trophy in the same year in five different years. Team competition saw her make her seventh consecutive Solheim Cup appearance, her 4 points making her total 21, the event's all-time leading points earner, and the inaugural Lexus Cup was played with Sörenstam as the Captain of the victorious International Team.

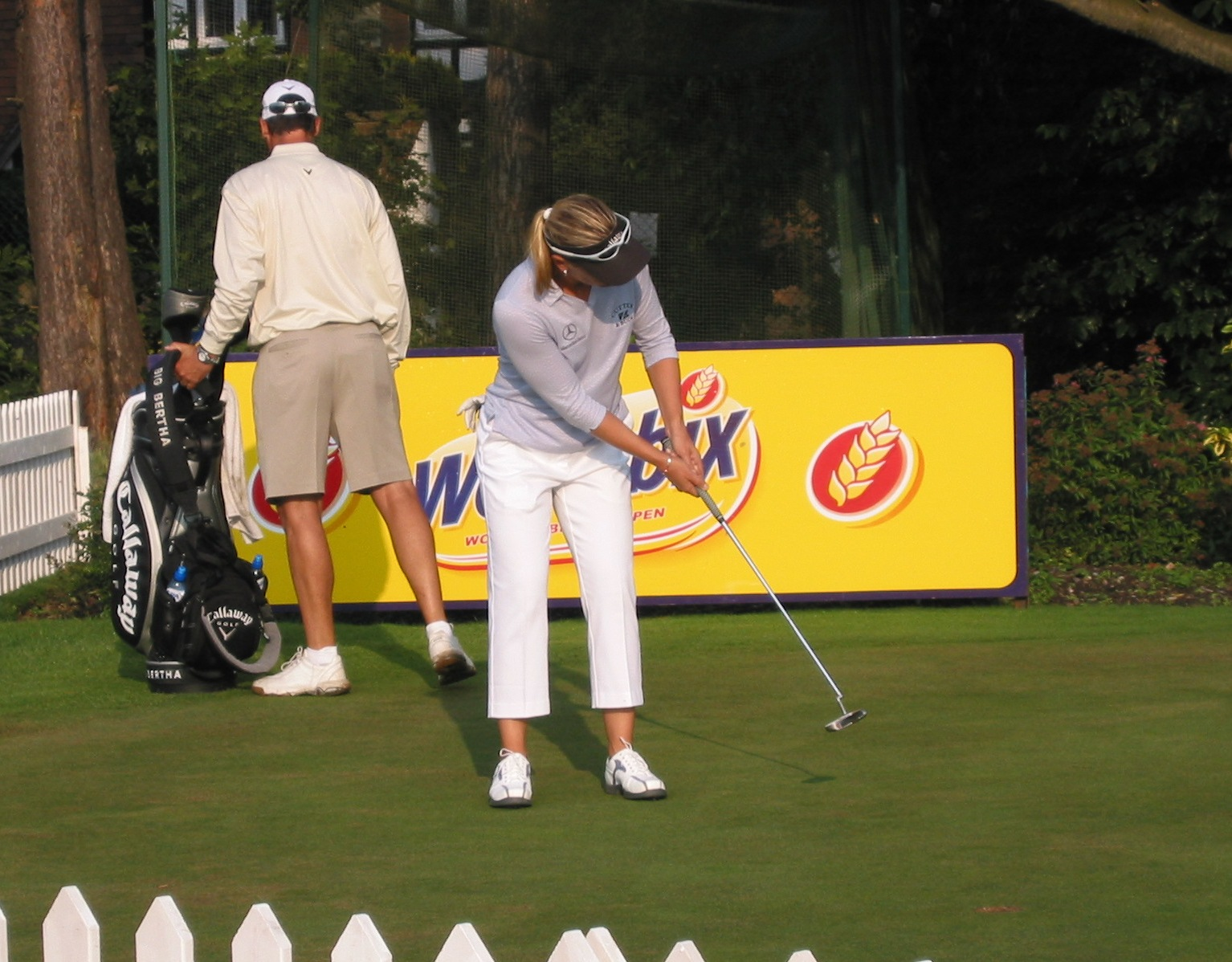
Sörenstam at the Women's British Open 2004

These events resulted in her receiving numerous awards. The Golf Writers Association of America named Sörenstam Female Player of the Year for the eighth time (1995, 1997, 2000–2005), Associated Press voted her Female Athlete of the Year for the third consecutive year and she became the first woman to win the Golf Writers' Trophy twice in the 55-year history of European golf's most prestigious award. Having previously won six Best Female Golfer ESPY Awards (1996, 1998–99, 2002–04), Sörenstam also received the 2005 ESPY Award as Best Female Athlete.

When the first-ever official Women's World Golf Rankings were unveiled in February 2006, Sörenstam was confirmed as the number-one player in women's golf, a position she relinquished to Lorena Ochoa on 22 April 2007. In partnership with Liselotte Neumann in team Sweden, she won the Women's World Cup of Golf, opened her LPGA season with a defence of her title in the MasterCard Classic. She then went winless in eight starts, causing some to talk of a slump. Her winning drought ended at the U.S. Women's Open, where she won an 18-hole playoff over Pat Hurst for her tenth major championship title, tying her for third on the list of players with most major championship titles. She totalled 3 wins on the LPGA and two on the Ladies European Tour, the inaugural Dubai Ladies Masters and the Swedish tournament she hosts, which she defended in her home town at the course where she learned to play. Her International team lost the second Lexus Cup competition to Team Asia.

Sörenstam started 2007 by losing a playoff while defending of her MasterCard Classic title. At the Kraft Nabisco Championship she shot her highest 72-hole score in a major in nine years, a result explained by her subsequent diagnosis with ruptured and bulging discs in her neck, the first major injury in Sörenstam's 13-year LPGA career. After a two-month injury rehabilitation break, Sörenstam returned as the Ginn Tribute tournament hostess where she admitted to being at only 85% fitness and finished tied for 36th place. She was still not fully fit in her next two tournaments, the LPGA Championship where she finished tied for 15th place, and the 2007 U.S. Women's Open, where, as defending champion, she finished tied for 32nd.

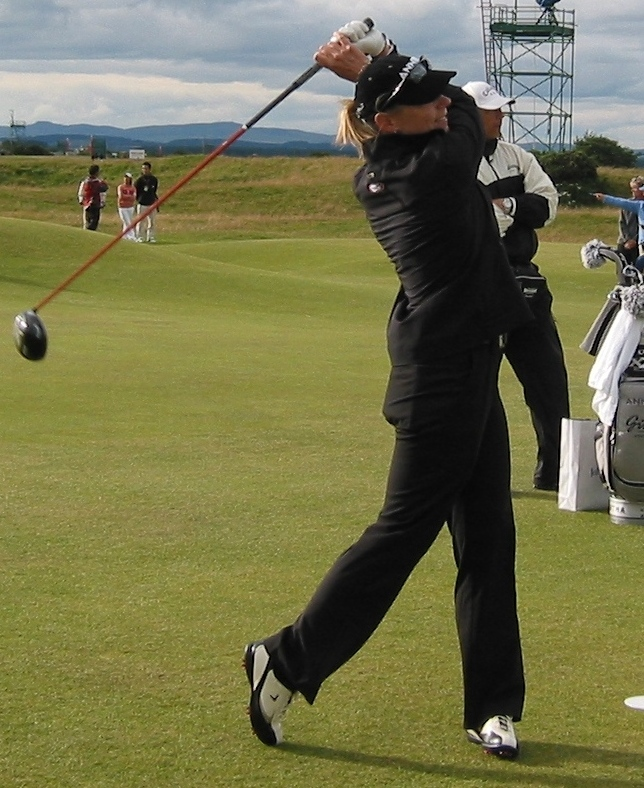
Sörenstam at the Women's British Open in 2007

After an early round defeat at the World Matchplay Championship, Sörenstam finished sixth at the Evian Masters, 16th at the Women's British Open and ninth in the Swedish tournament she hosts on the Ladies European Tour. On her return to the US, Sörenstam had three top ten finishes but missed the weekend at the season closing ADT Playoffs for the second year running. However, Sörenstam did win a worldwide title at the Dubai Ladies Masters on the Ladies European Tour in November 2007.

Declaring herself recovered from injury and ready to return to a complete season of competitive golf in 2008, Sörenstam opened the year at the SBS Open at Turtle Bay where she captured her 70th LPGA Tour victory and first since September 2006. She won next at the Stanford International Pro-Am in April then following a week off, won again at the Michelob ULTRA Open at Kingsmill in a tournament record score, giving her three wins and over $1 million in earnings by mid-May. It was her 72nd and final ever win on the LPGA Tour.

In 2008, Sörenstam was highly critical of other female golfers who tried to play in the PGA Tour – her comments to Michelle Wie for playing on the men's tour: "I really don't know why Michelle continues to do this. We have a major this week and, if you can't qualify for a major, I don't see any reason why you should play with the men."

=== Retirement ===
On 13 May 2008, Sörenstam announced at a press conference at the Sybase Classic that she would "step away" from competitive golf at the conclusion of the 2008 season. That night, she threw out the first pitch of the Washington Nationals/New York Mets baseball game at Shea Stadium in New York and the following day read the Top Ten on the Late Show with David Letterman.

Her last tournament victory came in a playoff at the Suzhou Taihu Ladies Open, an event co-sanctioned by the Ladies European Tour and the Ladies Asian Golf Tour tour. Her last scheduled tournament on the LPGA Tour was the season-ending ADT Championship in November, where she failed to make the weekend play in the event's unique playoff structure. Her final sanctioned LPGA appearance was as the winning captain of Team International at the 2008 Lexus Cup in Singapore. Her last professional tournament was the Dubai Ladies Masters on the Ladies European Tour in December 2008, where she finished tied for 7th.

=== Solheim Cup captaincy ===
At the 2013 Solheim Cup at the Colorado Golf Club in Parker, Colorado, United States, Sörenstam participated as a non-playing assistant captain, selected by European Team captain Liselotte Neumann. During the match, the Americans accused Sörenstam of telling a European caddie that European player Jodi Ewart Shadoff should concede a putt for par to Paula Creamer, so it could not show teammate Lexi Thompson the line for a coming putt. By the rules, only the captain was allowed to give advice to players during the competition. In the end, the 2013 match became an 18–10 triumph for the European team, winning on American soil for the first time and defending the cup for the first time.

For the 2015 Solheim Cup at Golf Club St. Leon-Rot, Germany, Sörenstam again was appointed an assistant captain by a Swedish European Team captain, this time Carin Koch. Two controversies with Sörenstam involved, given a lot of public attention, occurred during the match. The second day afternoon four-ball match between Suzann Pettersen and Charley Hull for Europe against Alison Lee and Brittany Lincicome, United States, was all square, when Lee missed a putt to win the 17th hole. Taking for granted that the next 18-inch putt was conceded, Lee picked up her ball. However, Pettersen pointed out that it was not conceded, and the Europeans won the hole. Koch and Sörenstam tried to convince Pettersen to change her mind and concede the putt, but as it was a fact that Lee had picked up her ball without the putt being given to her, it was not a possibility within the rules of golf, for the players to agree on the outcome of the hole and change the sequence of events afterwards. Pettersen/Hull eventually won the match.

Later during the 2015 Solheim Cup, after Koch and Sörenstam was seen in a discussion with U.S. captain Juli Inkster, Sörenstam explained that she was accused of giving advice, which she strongly denied. The 2015 match ended in a U.S. win 14 1/2–13 1/2, after a strong American come-back the last day, said to have been inspired by the incident with the not conceded putt.

Sörenstam was appointed captain of the 2017 European Solhem Cup team. The match, played at Des Moines Golf and Country Club, Iowa, United States, was won by the U.S. team 16 1/2–11 1/2.

=== Senior career ===
After turning 50 in October 2020, Sörenstam became eligible for the 2021 U.S. Senior Women's Open. It was played at Brooklawn Country Club, Fairfield, Connecticut and Sörenstam won by 8 shots, ahead of fellow countrywoman Liselotte Neumann after leading the tournament wire to wire, with her husband Mike McGee as her caddie. Ahead of the Senior Open, she played her first LPGA Tour event since 2008, finishing 74th at the 2021 Gainbridge LPGA at Boca Rio.

Her win at the Senior Open qualified her to play in the 2022 U.S. Women's Open, at which she missed the cut by shooting 13-over. In August 2026, Sörenstam finished runner-up at the U.S. Senior Women's Open, two strokes behind Maria McBride.

== Awards and honors ==
- In 1994, Sörenstam earned Elite Sign No. 98 by the Swedish Golf Federation, on the basis of national team appearances and national championship performances.
- In 1998, Sörenstam was awarded honorary member of the PGA of Sweden.
- In four years, 2005-2008, Sörenstam was host for a Ladies European Tour tournament in Sweden, Scandinavian TPC hosted by Annika. She won the tournament twice herself during those years and another four times before that.
- In 2012, Sörenstam founded the ANNIKA Invitational Europe, an annual amateur golf tournament in Sweden for European girls under 18. The tournament is a qualifying event for the European team in the Junior Solheim Cup since 2015 and has been rated up to level "A" in the World Amateur Golf Ranking.
- In 2014, the LPGA established the yearly Rolex Annika Major Award, named after Sörenstam, to recognize the overall best performance in the LPGA majors. Points are award for top-10 finishes in each major. The major winner with the most points at the end of the season wins the award.
- In February 2015, Sörenstam became one of seven women, invited as the first female honorary members of The Royal and Ancient Golf Club of St Andrews. The other six women were HRH Princess Anne, Dame Laura Davies, Renee Powell, Belle Robertson, Lally Segard and Louise Suggs.
- On 2 December 2020, Sörenstam was appointed president of the International Golf Federation from 1 January 2021.
- On 7 January 2021, three golfers: Sörenstam, Gary Player, and Babe Zaharias (posthumously), received the Presidential Medal of Freedom from President Donald Trump. At the time a number of national outlets criticized the golfers for accepting their medals the day after the January 6 United States Capitol attack, for which President Trump was later impeached. The following week New England Patriots coach Bill Belichick turned down a similar offer of the Medal. Sörenstam acknowledged that she received negative feedback for accepting the award and that she was "sad about January 6th in American history" but that the awards ceremony had been planned months before and she preferred to not second-guess past events and to move forward.
- In June 2021, Sörenstam hosted, together with fellow countryman Henrik Stenson, the Scandinavian Mixed hosted by Henrik and Annika, co-sanctioned by the European Tour and the Ladies European Tour, taking place in Sweden, for the first time bringing 78 men and 78 women together to compete in the same tournament for the same prize money, but playing from different tees. Sörenstam played in the first edition of the tournament at Vallda Golf & Country Club as well as in the second edition in 2022 at Halmstad Golf Club and the third edition in 2023 at Ullna Golf & Country Club.
- In 2021, it was announced that Sörenstam would host an LPGA tournament in 2023; the ANNIKA Driven by Gainbridge at Pelican. The tournament came to be a yearly event on the LPGA Tour.
- In 2022 Sörenstam accepted an invitation to become the first woman vice-president of the Association of Golf Writers, following in the footsteps of Sir Michael Bonallack, Tony Jacklin, Bernhard Langer, Jack Nicklaus and Gary Player.
- In October 2023, Sörenstam became, as the first LPGA player and one of few women, a member of Augusta National Golf Club.

== Business career ==
Sörenstam began the transition from professional golfer to entrepreneur during the later years of her career, attempting to combine golf, fitness and charitable works into various businesses under the ANNIKA brand with the brand statement "Share my Passion". They are all promoted by her website on which there is a blog to which she and her staff regularly contribute.

=== Golf course design ===
Since 2003, Sörenstam has also worked as a golf course architect, undertaken a number of course design projects. Her first, the Annika Course, was completed at Mission Hills Golf Club in Shenzhen, China, in 2003; the second was officially launched in January 2006 and opened in 2008 at Euphoria Golf Estate & Hydro in South Africa. In 2008 she also announced a new project at Mines Golf City, near Kuala Lumpur, Malaysia. Projects closer to home include a redesign of the Patriots Point Links Course near Charleston, South Carolina and a course at Red Mountain Resort, British Columbia.

She and Jack Nicklaus lost out on a bid to build the Olympic golf course in Rio to Gil Hanse and his consultant Amy Alcott. In 2010, a golf course she designed was opened in South Korea at Golden Bay Resort. This was the first project for her after-retirement golf course design.

In an interview with CNN in October 2017, Sörenstam spoke about the difficulties of being a woman in the golf course design industry, saying that a common stereotype is that courses she designs will be "short and easy".

=== The ANNIKA Academy ===
The ANNIKA Academy at Ginn Reunion Resort in Reunion, Florida began construction in 2006 and opened in April 2007 with Sörenstam's longtime coach Henri Reis serving as head instructor, her sister Charlotta an instructor and club fitter, her personal trainer Kai Fusser focusing on overall fitness training, and with Sörenstam available for coaching on certain golfing packages. The opening ceremony included a Make-A-Wish Foundation golf clinic conducted by Sörenstam who is a United States ambassador for the Make-A-Wish Foundation and it also hosted clinics for junior golfers during The Annika Invitational, an American Junior Golf Association invitation-only event featuring the top 60 girls from around the world hosted by The ANNIKA Foundation.

The Annika Academy closed in May 2016.

=== Other business ventures ===
Other branches of the ANNIKA business include a clothing line with Cutter & Buck, a limited label wine produced in partnership with Wente Vineyards, and a signature fragrance developed by SA Fragrances. Sörenstam also hosted the Ginn Tribute Hosted by Annika, an event on the LPGA Tour in 2007 and 2008, and the Scandinavian TPC hosted by Annika on the Ladies European Tour during its last four years from 2005 through 2008. She won the latter tournament in 2005 and 2006.

One of Sörenstam's hobbies is cooking. She has participated in cooking demonstrations during LPGA tournaments and has talked about enrolling in cooking school. Before the 2003 season Sörenstam took the opportunity to improve her culinary skills by working eight-hour shifts in the kitchens of the Lake Nona Country Club. Sörenstam has had a serious interest in investments, real estate and the stock market since she earned her first LPGA check and in August 2006 was invited to ring the closing bell at the New York Stock Exchange.

== Personal life ==
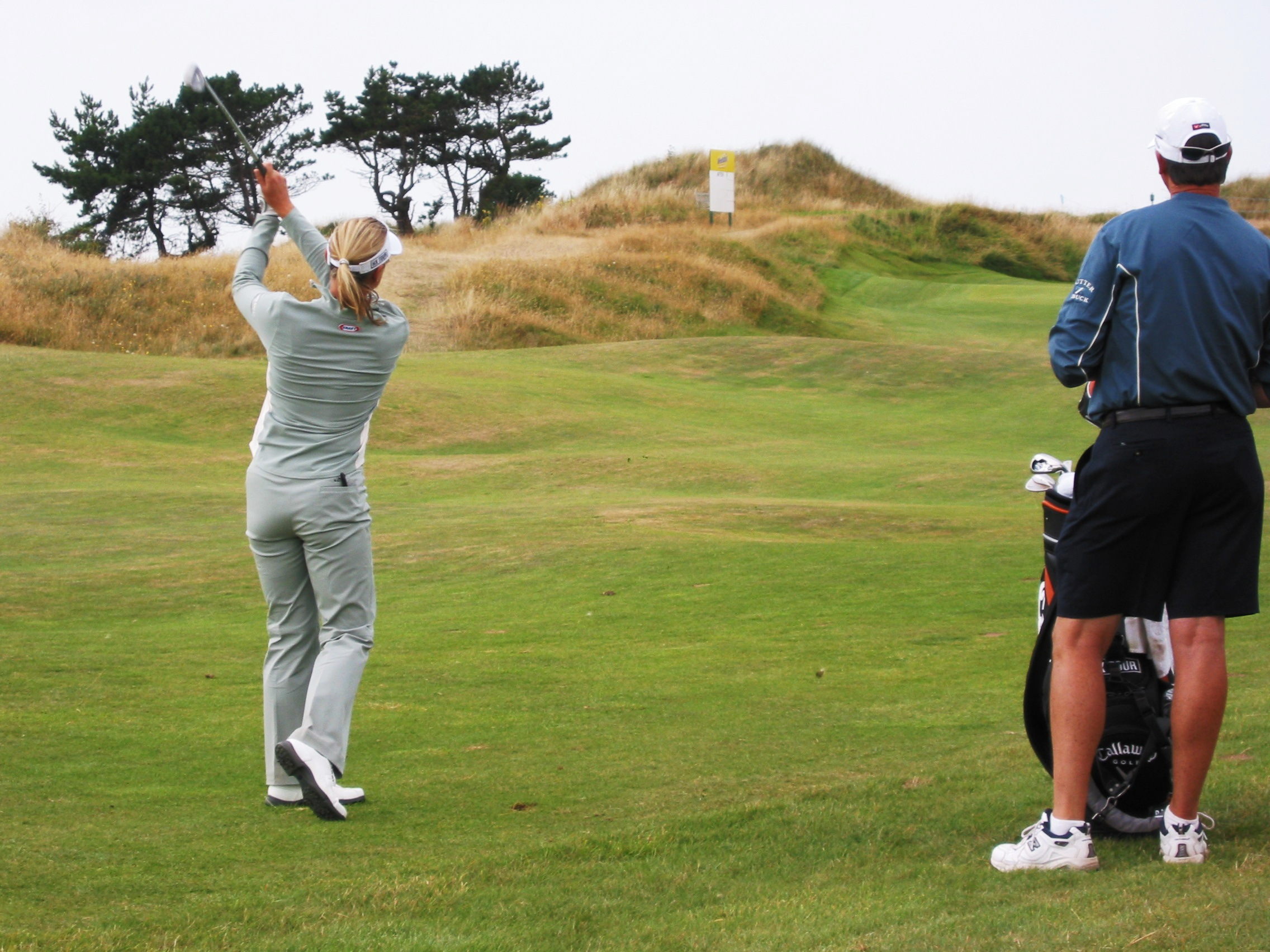
Sörenstam at the Women's British Open 2005

Sörenstam met her first husband David Esch in 1994 on the driving range at Moon Valley Country Club, Phoenix, Arizona, where she was an LPGA rookie practicing for a tournament and he worked for club manufacturer Ping. They were engaged at the 1995 Evian Masters, and married in Lake Tahoe on 4 January 1997. They divorced in 2005.

In August 2007, Sörenstam became engaged to Mike McGee, the managing director for the ANNIKA brand of businesses and son of former PGA Tour and Champions Tour player Jerry McGee. They married at Lake Nona Golf & Country Club in Orlando, Florida, on 10 January 2009.

Their daughter Ava Madelyn McGee was born 1 September 2009. On 21 March 2011, Sörenstam gave birth to a son, William Nicholas McGee, thirteen weeks premature.

Since 2006, Sörenstam has held dual American and Swedish citizenship.

== Amateur wins ==
- 1991 NCAA Division I Championship Individual title
- 1992 Espirito Santo Trophy Individual title

== Professional wins (97) ==
=== LPGA Tour wins (72) ===
Legend
Major championships (10)
Other LPGA Tour (62)

No.	Date	Tournament	Winning score	Margin of victory	Runner(s)-up
1	16 Jul 1995	**U.S. Women's Open**	−2 (67-71-72-68=278)	1 stroke	(United States) Meg Mallon
2	24 Sep 1995	GHP Heartland Classic	−10 (69-67-70-72=278)	10 strokes	(Australia) Jan Stephenson
3	15 Oct 1995	Samsung World Championship of Women's Golf	−6 (72-69-71-70=282)	Playoff	(England) Laura Davies
4	2 Jun 1996	**U.S. Women's Open** (2)	−8 (70-67-69-66=272)	6 strokes	(United States) Kris Tschetter
5	13 Oct 1996	CoreStates Betsy King Classic	−18 (66-69-67-68=270)	8 strokes	(England) Laura Davies
6	20 Oct 1996	Samsung World Championship of Women's Golf (2)	−14 (66-69-69-70=274)	1 stroke	(Sweden) Helen Alfredsson
7	12 Jan 1997	Chrysler-Plymouth Tournament of Champions	−16 (72-66-68-66=272)	4 strokes	(Australia) Karrie Webb
8	22 Feb 1997	Cup Noodles Hawaiian Ladies Open	−10 (67-66-73=206)	1 stroke	(United States) Meg Mallon
9	6 Apr 1997	Longs Drugs Challenge	−3 (73-68-71-73=285)	Playoff	(United States) Pam Kometani
10	1 Jun 1997	Michelob Light Classic	−11 (70-69-66-72=277)	3 strokes	(Japan) Hiromi Kobayashi
11	5 Oct 1997	CoreStates Betsy King Classic	−14 (70-67-68-69=274)	2 strokes	(United States) Kelly Robbins
12	23 Nov 1997	ITT LPGA Tour Championship	−11 (72-68-67-70=277)	Playoff	(Canada) Lorie Kane (United States) Pat Hurst
13	7 Jun 1998	Michelob Light Classic (2)	−8 (67-73-68=208)	Playoff	(United States) Donna Andrews
14	28 Jun 1998	ShopRite LPGA Classic	−17 (66-65-65=196)	4 strokes	(United States) Juli Inkster
15	19 Jul 1998	JAL Big Apple Classic	−19 (67-66-65-67=265)	8 strokes	(United States) Joan Pitcock
16	13 Sep 1998	Safeco Classic	−15 (68-70-67-68=273)	5 strokes	(England) Laura Davies (United States) Patty Sheehan
17	11 Jul 1999	Michelob Light Classic (3)	−10 (68-72-68-70=278)	Playoff	(United States) Tina Barrett
18	3 Oct 1999	New Albany Golf Classic	−19 (68-66-69-66=269)	3 strokes	(Australia) Mardi Lunn
19	13 Mar 2000	Welch's/Circle K Championship	−19 (67-68-67-67=269)	Playoff	(United States) Pat Hurst
20	21 May 2000	Firstar LPGA Classic	-19 (66-65-66=197)	1 stroke	(United States) Cristie Kerr (Australia) Karrie Webb
21	17 Jun 2000	Evian Masters^{1}	−12 (70-68-70-68=276)	Playoff	(Australia) Karrie Webb
22	9 Jul 2000	Jamie Farr Kroger Classic	−10 (70-67-66-71=274)	Playoff	(Australia) Rachel Hetherington
23	16 Jul 2000	Japan Airlines Big Apple Classic	−7 (69-65-72=206)	1 stroke	(United States) Rosie Jones
24	11 Mar 2001	Welch's/Circle K Championship (2)	−23 (65-68-67-65=265)	6 strokes	(South Korea) Se Ri Pak (United States) Michelle McGann (United States) Laura Diaz (United States) Dottie Pepper
25	18 Mar 2001	Standard Register PING	−27 (65-59-69-68=261)	2 strokes	(South Korea) Se Ri Pak
26	25 Mar 2001	**Nabisco Championship**	−7 (72-70-70-69=281)	3 strokes	(Australia) Karrie Webb (Scotland) Janice Moodie (United States) Dottie Pepper (Japan) Akiko Fukushima (Australia) Rachel Teske
27	14 Apr 2001	The Office Depot	−6 (71-73-66=210)	Playoff	(South Korea) Mi-Hyun Kim
28	6 May 2001	Chick-fil-A Charity Championship	−13 (70-66-67=203)	Playoff	(Sweden) Sophie Gustafson
29	19 Aug 2001	Bank of Montreal Canadian Women's Open	−16 (71-68-64-69=272)	2 strokes	(United States) Kelly Robbins
30	28 Oct 2001	Cisco World Ladies Match Play Championship	1 up		(South Korea) Se Ri Pak
31	4 Nov 2001	Mizuno Classic^{2}	−13 (66-67-70=203)	3 strokes	(England) Laura Davies
32	2 Mar 2002	LPGA Takefuji Classic	−14 (64-66-66=196)	Playoff	(Canada) Lorie Kane
33	31 Mar 2002	**Kraft Nabisco Championship** (2)	−8 (70-71-71-68=280)	1 stroke	(Sweden) Liselotte Neumann
34	12 May 2002	Aerus Electrolux USA Championship	−17 (65-72-70-64=271)	1 stroke	(United States) Pat Hurst
35	2 Jun 2002	Kellogg-Keebler Classic	−21 (63-67-65=195)	11 strokes	(United States) Michele Redman (Scotland) Mhairi McKay (United States) Danielle Ammaccapane
36	15 Jun 2002	Evian Masters^{1} (2)	−19 (68-67-65-69=269)	4 strokes	(Sweden) Maria Hjorth (South Korea) Mi-Hyun Kim
37	30 Jun 2002	ShopRite LPGA Classic (2)	−12 (68-67-66=201)	3 strokes	(Sweden) Carin Koch (United States) Kate Golden
38	8 Sep 2002	Williams Championship	−11 (68-66-65=199	4 strokes	(Canada) Lorie Kane
39	15 Sep 2002	Safeway Classic	−17 (69-62-68=199)	1 stroke	(United States) Kate Golden
40	6 Oct 2002	Samsung World Championship	−22 (66-67-68-65=266)	6 strokes	(United States) Cristie Kerr
41	10 Nov 2002	Mizuno Classic^{2} (2)	−15 (69-65-67=201)	2 strokes	(South Korea) Grace Park
42	24 Nov 2002	ADT Championship (2)	−13 (67-70-70-68=275)	3 strokes	(Australia) Rachel Teske
43	6 Apr 2003	The Office Depot Championship	−5 (68-72-71=211)	4 strokes	(South Korea) Se Ri Pak (United States) Pat Hurst (United States) Heather Bowie
44	1 Jun 2003	Kellogg-Keebler Classic (2)	−17 (62-66-71=199)	3 strokes	(Scotland) Mhairi McKay
45	8 Jun 2003	**McDonald's LPGA Championship**	−6 (70-64-72-72=278)	Playoff	(South Korea) Grace Park
46	3 Aug 2003	**Women's British Open**^{1}	−10 (68-72-68-70=278)	1 stroke	(South Korea) Se Ri Pak
47	28 Sep 2003	Safeway Classic (2)	−15 (67-68-66=201)	1 stroke	(United States) Beth Daniel
48	9 Nov 2003	Mizuno Classic^{2} (3)	−24 (63-63-66=192)	9 strokes	(South Korea) Grace Park (South Korea) Se Ri Pak (Sweden) Sophie Gustafson
49	21 Mar 2004	Safeway International (2)	−18 (67-65-68-70=270)	4 strokes	(United States) Cristie Kerr
50	4 Apr 2004	Office Depot Championship	−9 (68-70-69=207)	3 strokes	(United States) Ashli Bunch (United States) Meg Mallon
51	30 May 2004	LPGA Corning Classic	−18 (65-67-70-68=270)	2 strokes	(United States) Vicki Goetze-Ackerman (United States) Michelle Estill
52	13 Jun 2004	**McDonald's LPGA Championship** (2)	−13 (68-67-64-72=271)	3 strokes	(South Korea) Shi Hyun Ahn
53	12 Sep 2004	John Q. Hammons Hotel Classic (2)	−9 (66-68-70=204)	4 strokes	(South Korea) Shi Hyun Ahn
54	17 Oct 2004	Samsung World Championship	−18 (66-68-69-67=270)	3 strokes	(South Korea) Grace Park
55	7 Nov 2004	Mizuno Classic^{2} (4)	−22 (63-66-65=194)	9 strokes	(Japan) Michie Ohba (South Korea) Grace Park (Japan) Ai Miyazato
56	21 Nov 2004	ADT Championship (3)	−13 (66-68-72-69=275)	Playoff	(United States) Cristie Kerr
57	6 Mar 2005	MasterCard Classic	−7 (70-71-68=209)	3 strokes	(Australia) Karrie Webb
58	20 Mar 2005	Safeway International (3)	−11 (66-69-72-70=277)	Playoff	(Mexico) Lorena Ochoa
59	27 Mar 2005	**Kraft Nabisco Championship** (3)	−15 (70-69-66-68=273)	8 strokes	(United States) Rosie Jones
60	15 May 2005	Chick-fil-A Charity Championship	−23 (67-64-67-67=265)	10 strokes	(Taiwan) Candie Kung
61	5 Jun 2005	ShopRite LPGA Classic	−17 (67-65-64=196)	4 strokes	(United States) Juli Inkster
62	12 Jun 2005	**McDonald's LPGA Championship** (3)	−11 (68-67-69-73=277)	3 strokes	(United States) Michelle Wie
63	18 Sep 2005	John Q. Hammons Hotel Classic (3)	−5 (68-67-73=208)	1 stroke	(United States) Paula Creamer
64	16 Oct 2005	Samsung World Championship	−18 (64-71-66-69=270)	8 strokes	(United States) Paula Creamer
65	6 Nov 2005	Mizuno Classic^{2} (5)	−21 (64-67-64=195)	3 strokes	(Philippines) Jennifer Rosales
66	20 Nov 2005	ADT Championship (4)	−6 (69-70-74-69=282)	2 strokes	(South Korea) Kang Soo-yun (United States) Michele Redman (Sweden) Liselotte Neumann
67	12 Mar 2006	MasterCard Classic (2)	−8 (67-71-70=208)	1 stroke	(Sweden) Helen Alfredsson (South Korea) Seon Hwa Lee
68	2 Jul 2006	**U.S. Women's Open** (3)	E (69-71-73-71=284)	Playoff	(United States) Pat Hurst
69	3 Sep 2006	State Farm Classic	−19 (70-68-69-62=269)	2 strokes	(United States) Cristie Kerr
70	16 Feb 2008	SBS Open at Turtle Bay	−10 (70-67-69=206)	2 strokes	(Thailand) Russy Gulyanamitta (United States) Laura Diaz (United States) Jane Park
71	27 Apr 2008	Stanford International Pro-Am	−8 (68-67-70-70=275)	Playoff	(United States) Paula Creamer
72	11 May 2008	Michelob ULTRA Open at Kingsmill	−19 (64-66-69-66=265)	7 strokes	(United States) Allison Fouch (England) Karen Stupples (South Korea) Jeong Jang (United States) Christina Kim

LPGA Tour playoff record (16–6)

No.	Year	Tournament	Opponent(s)	Result
1	1995	Samsung World Championship of Women's Golf	(England) Laura Davies	Won with birdie on first extra hole
2	1997	Longs Drugs Challenge	(United States) Pam Kometani	Won with par on second extra hole
3	1997	ITT LPGA Tour Championship	(United States) Pat Hurst (Canada) Lorie Kane	Won with par on third extra hole Hurst eliminated by par on first hole
4	1998	Michelob Light Classic	(United States) Donna Andrews	Won with birdie on second extra hole
5	1998	First Union Betsy King Classic	(Australia) Rachel Hetherington	Lost to birdie on first extra hole
6	1999	Valley of the Stars Championship	(Sweden) Catrin Nilsmark	Lost to par on second extra hole
7	1999	Michelob Light Classic	(United States) Tina Barrett	Won with birdie on third extra hole
8	2000	LPGA Takefuji Classic	(Australia) Karrie Webb	Lost to birdie on first extra hole
9	2000	Welch's/Circle K Championship	(United States) Pat Hurst	Won with birdie on second extra hole
10	2000	Evian Masters^{1}	(Australia) Karrie Webb	Won with eagle on first extra hole
11	2000	Jamie Farr Kroger Classic	(Australia) Rachel Hetherington	Won with birdie on second extra hole
12	2001	The Office Depot	(South Korea) Mi-Hyun Kim	Won with par on first extra hole
13	2001	Chick-fil-A Charity Championship	(Sweden) Sophie Gustafson	Won with par on second extra hole
14	2002	LPGA Takefuji Classic	(Canada) Lori Kane	Won with birdie on first extra hole
15	2002	PING Banner Health	(Australia) Rachel Teske	Lost to birdie on second extra hole
16	2003	**McDonald's LPGA Championship**	(South Korea) Grace Park	Won with par on first extra hole
17	2003	Giant Eagle LPGA Classic	(Canada) Lorie Kane (Philippines) Jennifer Rosales (Australia) Rachel Teske	Teske won with birdie on third extra hole
18	2004	ADT Championship	(United States) Cristie Kerr	Won with bogey on first extra hole
19	2005	Safeway International	(Mexico) Lorena Ochoa	Won with par on first extra hole
20	2006	**U.S. Women's Open**	(United States) Pat Hurst	Won 18-hole playoff (Sörenstam:70, Hurst:74)
21	2007	MasterCard Classic	(United States) Meaghan Francella	Lost to birdie on fourth extra hole
22	2008	Stanford International Pro-Am	(United States) Paula Creamer	Won with par on first extra hole

LPGA majors are shown in bold.

Note: Sörenstam won the Bank of Montreal Canadian Women's Open (formerly named the du Maurier Classic) in 2001, the year after it stopped being recognized as a major championship on the LPGA Tour.

=== Ladies European Tour wins (17) ===
No.	Date	Tournament	Winning score	Margin of victory	Runner(s)-up
1	18 Jun 1995	OVB Damen Open Austria	−22 (66-69-67-68=270)	3 strokes	(England) Laura Davies
2	2 Jul 1995	Hennessy Cup	−17 (68-70-65-68=271)	1 stroke	(Sweden) Liselotte Neumann
3	25 Aug 1996	Trygg Hansa Ladies' Open	−13 (70-70-70-69=279)	1 stroke	(England) Joanne Morley (England) Alison Nicholas
4	24 Aug 1997	Compaq Open	−11 (67-67-73-70=277)	6 strokes	(Sweden) Catrin Nilsmark
5	23 Aug 1998	Compaq Open (2)	−9 (70-71-71-67=279)	10 strokes	(Sweden) Helen Alfredsson (England) Johanna Head (Sweden) Catrin Nilsmark
6	17 Jun 2000	Evian Masters^{1}	−12 (70-68-70-68=276)	Playoff	(Australia) Karrie Webb
7	24 Feb 2002	ANZ Ladies Masters^{3} (2)	−10 (74-64-71-69=278)	Playoff	(Australia) Karrie Webb
8	15 Jun 2002	Evian Masters^{1} (2)	−19 (68-67-65-69=269)	4 strokes	(Sweden) Maria Hjorth (South Korea) Mi Hyun Kim
9	18 Aug 2002	Compaq Open (3)	−17 (67-66-68-70=271)	4 strokes	(Sweden) Sophie Gustafson
10	3 Aug 2003	**Women's British Open**^{1}	−10 (68-72-68-70=278)	1 stroke	(South Korea) Se Ri Pak
11	29 Feb 2004	ANZ Ladies Masters^{3} (2)	−19 (69-70-65-65=269)	4 strokes	(England) Karen Stupples
12	8 Aug 2004	HP Open (4)	−13 (70 72 69 64=275)	2 strokes	(Sweden) Carin Koch
13	7 Aug 2005	Scandinavian TPC hosted by Annika (5)	−4 (70-75-67-72=284)	1 stroke	(United States) Natalie Gulbis
14	13 Aug 2006	Scandinavian TPC hosted by Annika (6)	−21 (66 71 69 65=271)	1 stroke	(Mexico) Lorena Ochoa
15	29 Oct 2006	Dubai Ladies Masters	−18 (65-68-68-69=270)	6 strokes	(Sweden) Helen Alfredsson
16	19 Dec 2007	Dubai Ladies Masters (2)	−10 (70-70-68-70=278)	2 strokes	(England) Laura Davies (Denmark) Iben Tinning
17	2 Nov 2008	Suzhou Taihu Ladies Open	−13 (69-69-65=203)	Playoff	(China) Ye Li-ying

Ladies European Tour playoff record (3–0)

No.	Year	Tournament	Opponent(s)	Result
1	2000	Evian Masters^{1}	(Australia) Karrie Webb	Won with eagle on first extra hole
2	2002	ANZ Ladies Masters^{3}	(Australia) Karrie Webb	Won with par on fourth extra hole
3	2008	Suzhou Taihu Ladies Open	(China) Ye Li-ying	Won with birdie on second extra hole

Note: Sörenstam won The Evian Championship (formerly named the Evian Masters) twice before it was recognized as a major championship on the LPGA Tour in 2013.

=== ALPG Tour wins (4) ===
No.	Date	Tournament	Winning score	Margin of victory	Runner(s)-up
1	11 Dec 1994	Holden Women's Australian Open	−2 (68-72-72-74=286)	5 strokes	(Australia) Rachel Hetherington
2	19 Nov 1995	Alpine Australian Ladies Masters	−22 (66-68-67-69=270)	5 strokes	(United States) Jane Geddes
3	24 Feb 2002	ANZ Ladies Masters^{3} (2)	−10 (74-64-71-69=278)	Playoff	(Australia) Karrie Webb
4	19 Feb 2004	ANZ Ladies Masters^{3} (3)	−19 (69-70-65-65=269)	4 strokes	(England) Karen Stupples

ALPG Tour playoff record (1–1)

No.	Year	Tournament	Opponent(s)	Result
1	1995	Holden Women's Australian Open	(United States) Jane Geddes (Sweden) Liselotte Neumann	Neumann won with birdie on third extra hole Geddes eliminated by birdie on second extra hole
2	2002	ANZ Ladies Masters^{3}	(Australia) Karrie Webb	Won with par on fourth extra hole

=== LPGA of Japan Tour wins (7) ===
No.	Date	Tournament	Winning score	Margin of victory	Runner(s)-up
1	26 Oct 1997	Hisako Higuchi Kibun Classic	−1 (72-70-73-72=287)	1 stroke	(South Korea) Ku Ok-hee (Japan) Natsuko Noro
2	4 Nov 2001	Mizuno Classic^{2}	−13 (66-67-70=203)	3 strokes	(England) Laura Davies
3	10 Nov 2002	Mizuno Classic^{2} (2)	−15 (69-65-67=201)	2 strokes	(South Korea) Grace Park
4	11 May 2003	Nichirei Cup World Ladies	−13 (66-71-68=275	9 strokes	(Japan) Yuri Fudoh (Japan) Michiko Hattori (Japan) Yuko Moriguchi (Japan) Junko Otmoe (Japan) Kaori Suzuki (Japan) Junko Yasui
5	9 Nov 2003	Mizuno Classic^{2} (3)	−24 (63-63-66=192)	9 strokes	(Sweden) Sophie Gustafson (South Korea) Pak Se-ri (South Korea) Grace Park
6	7 Nov 2004	Mizuno Classic^{2} (4)	−22 (63-66-65=194)	9 strokes	(Japan) Michie Ohba (South Korea) Grace Park (Japan) Ai Miyazato
7	6 Nov 2005	Mizuno Classic^{2} (5)	−21 (64-67-64=195)	3 strokes	(Philippines) Jennifer Rosales

=== Swedish Golf Tour wins (4) ===
No.	Date	Tournament	Winning score	Margin of victory	Runner(s)-up
1	13 May 1990	Kanthal-Höganäs Open (as an amateur)	+11 (77-73-71=221)	1 stroke	(Sweden) Marie Wennersten-From
2	1 Jul 1990	Stora Lundby Ladies Open^{4} (as an amateur)	+12 (76-77-39=192)	1 stroke	(Sweden) Anna-Carin Jonasson (Sweden) Pia Nilsson
3	16 Jun 1991	Ängsö Ladies Open (as an amateur)	+3 (73-72-74=219)	2 strokes	(Sweden) Marie Wennersten-From
4	16 May 1993	Höganäs Ladies Open	−2 (70-70-71=211)	5 strokes	(Sweden) Maria Bertilsköld

=== Other wins (2) ===
No.	Date	Tournament	Winning score	Margin of victory	Runner(s)-up
1	25 May 1997	JCPenney/LPGA Skins Game^{5}	4-4=8	3 skins	(England) Laura Davies
2	22 Jan 2006	Women's World Cup of Golf^{6} (with (Sweden) Liselotte Neumann)	−7 (65-69-77-70=281)	3 strokes	Scotland − Catriona Matthew / Janice Moodie

Notes

- ^{1} Co-sanctioned by LPGA Tour and Ladies European Tour
- ^{2} Co-sanctioned by LPGA Tour and LPGA of Japan Tour
- ^{3} Co-sanctioned by ALPG Tour and Ladies European Tour
- ^{4} 54-hole tournament shortened to 45 holes
- ^{5} Unofficial-money tournament on the LPGA Tour
- ^{6} Team event and unofficial-money tournament on the LPGA Tour and Ladies European Tour

=== Legends Tour wins (1) ===
Legend
Legends Tour major championships (1)
Other Legends Tour (0)

No.	Date	Tournament	Winning score	Margin of victory	Runner(s)-up
1	1 Aug 2021	U.S. Senior Women's Open	-12 (67-69-72-68=276)	8 strokes	(Sweden) Liselotte Neumann

== Major championships ==
=== Wins (10) ===
Year	Championship	Winning score	Margin	Runner(s)-up
1995	U.S. Women's Open	−2 (67-71-72-68=278)	1 stroke	(United States) Meg Mallon
1996	U.S. Women's Open	−8 (70-67-69-66=272)	6 strokes	(United States) Kris Tschetter
2001	Nabisco Championship	−7 (72-70-70-69=281)	3 strokes	(Japan) Akiko Fukushima, (Australia) Rachel Hetherington, (Scotland) Janice Moodie, (United States) Dottie Pepper, (Australia) Karrie Webb
2002	Kraft Nabisco Championship	−8 (70-71-71-68=280)	1 stroke	(Sweden) Liselotte Neumann
2003	McDonald's LPGA Championship	−6 (70-64-72-72=278)	Playoff ^{1}	(South Korea) Grace Park
2003	Women's British Open	−10 (68-72-68-70=278)	1 stroke	(South Korea) Se Ri Pak
2004	McDonald's LPGA Championship	−17 (68-67-64-72=271)	3 strokes	(South Korea) Shi Hyun Ahn
2005	Kraft Nabisco Championship	−15 (70-69-66-68=273)	8 strokes	(United States) Rosie Jones
2005	McDonald's LPGA Championship	−11 (68-67-69-73=277)	3 strokes	(United States) Michelle Wie
2006	U.S. Women's Open	E (69-71-73-71=284)	Playoff ^{2}	(United States) Pat Hurst

^{1} Defeated Grace Park with par on first extra hole
^{2} Defeated Hurst in 18-hole playoff: Sörenstam (70), Hurst (74)

=== Results timeline ===
Tournament	1992	1993	1994	1995	1996	1997	1998	1999	2000
Kraft Nabisco Championship				T24	T2	T8	T7	T7	T17
LPGA Championship				10	T14	3	T30	T16	T12
U.S. Women's Open	T63			1	1	CUT	T41	CUT	T9
du Maurier Classic			T22	T45	T6	CUT	2		3

Tournament	2001	2002	2003	2004	2005	2006	2007	2008
Kraft Nabisco Championship	1	1	2	T13	1	T6	T31	T2
LPGA Championship	5	3	1	1	1	T9	T15	T3
U.S. Women's Open	T16	2	4	2	T23	1	T32	T24
Women's British Open ^	T32	CUT	1	13	T5	T31	T16	T24

Tournament	2009–21	2022	2023
The Chevron Championship			
Women's PGA Championship			
U.S. Women's Open		CUT	CUT
The Evian Championship^^			
Women's British Open			

^ The Women's British Open replaced the du Maurier Classic as an LPGA major in 2001
^^ The Evian Championship was added as a major in 2013.

Win
Top 10
Did not play

CUT = missed the half-way cut
"T" = tied for place

=== Summary ===
Tournament	Wins	2nd	3rd	Top-5	Top-10	Top-25	Events	Cuts made
Kraft Nabisco Championship	3	3	0	6	10	13	14	14
LPGA Championship	3	0	3	7	9	13	14	14
U.S. Women's Open	3	2	0	6	7	10	17	13
du Maurier Classic	0	1	1	2	3	4	6	5
Women's British Open	1	0	0	2	2	5	8	7
Totals	10	6	4	23	31	45	59	53

- Most consecutive cuts made – 24 (2003 Kraft Nabisco − 2008 British Open)
- Longest streak of top-10s – 4 (4 times)

== LPGA Tour record ==
Year	Tournaments played	Cuts made*	Wins	2nd	3rd	Top 10s	Best finish	Earnings (US$)	Money list rank	Scoring average	Scoring rank
1992 †	1	1	0	0	0	0	T64	n/a	n/a	77.00	n/a
1993 †	3	3	0	0	0	2	4	n/a	n/a	71.09	n/a (5)
1994	18	14	0	1	0	3	T2	127,451	39	71.90	17
1995	19	19	3	3	1	12	1	666,533	1	71.00	1
1996	20	20	3	2	1	14	1	808,311	3	70.47	1
1997	22	20	6	5	3	16	1	1,236,789	1	70.04	2
1998	21	21	4	4	2	17	1	1,092,748	1	69.99	1
1999	22	21	2	2	4	15	1	863,816	4	70.40	2
2000	22	22	5	2	4	15	1	1,404,948	2	70.47	2
2001	26	26	8	6	1	20	1	2,105,868	1	69.42	1
2002	23	22	11	3	3	20	1	2,863,904	1	68.70	1
2003	17	17	6	4	1	15	1	2,029,506	1	69.02	1
2004	18	18	8	4	0	16	1	2,544,707	1	68.70	1
2005	20	20	10	2	0	15	1	2,588,240	1	69.33	1
2006	20	19	3	5	1	16	1	1,971,741	3	69.82	2
2007	13	13	0	1	2	6	2	532,718	25	71.27	4
2008	22	22	3	2	1	10	1	1,735,912	4	70.47	2
2021	1	1	0	0	0	0	74	3,833	180	75.25	n/a
2022	2	1	0	0	0	0	T28	6,668	169	77.50	n/a
2023	1	0	0	0	0	0	MC	0	n/a	79.50	n/a
Totals^	307 (1994)	296 (1994)	72	46	24	207 (1994)	1	22,583,693	1		

^ As of 2023 season
* Includes matchplay and other tournaments without a cut.
† Not official in LPGA records, 307 tournaments played, 296 cuts made, 207 top-10s

== World ranking ==
Position in Women's World Golf Rankings at the end of each calendar year.

Year	Ranking
2006	1
2007	4
2008	3

On 5 January 2009, Sörenstam, who was ranked third the previous week despite having announced her retirement effective at the end of the 2008 season, was removed from the rankings. No official explanation was given for her removal. Sörenstam later posted in her personal blog that she asked to be removed.

== Team appearances ==
Amateur

- European Lady Junior's Team Championship (representing Sweden): 1990 (winners)
- Espirito Santo Trophy (representing Sweden): 1990, 1992 (individual winner)
- European Ladies' Team Championship (representing Sweden): 1991

Professional

- Solheim Cup (representing Europe): 1994, 1996, 1998, 2000 (winners), 2002, 2003 (winners), 2005, 2007, 2017 (non-playing captain)
- Lexus Cup (representing International team): 2005 (playing captain, winners), 2006 (playing captain), 2007 (playing captain), 2008 (playing captain, winners)
- World Cup (representing Sweden): 2006 (winners)

=== Solheim Cup record ===
Year	Total matches	Total W–L–H	Singles W–L–H	Foursomes W–L–H	Fourballs W–L–H	Points won	Points %
Career	37	22–11–4	4–3–1	11–3–1	7–5–2	24	64.9
1994	3	1–2–0	0–1–0 lost to T. Green	1–0–0 won w/ C.Nilsmark 1 up	0–1–0 lost w/ C. Nilsmark 6&5	1	33.3
1996	5	3–0–2	1–0–0 def. P. Bradley 2&1	1–0–1 halved w/ C. Nilsmark, won w/ C. Nilsmark 1 up	1–0–1 won w/ K. Marshall 1 up, halved w/ T. Johnson	4	80.0
1998	5	3–2–0	1–0–0 def. D. Andrews 2&1	1–1–0 won w/ C. Matthew 3&2, lost w/ C. Matthew 3&2	1–1–0 lost w/ C. Nilsmark 2 up, won w/ C. Nilsmark 5&3	3	60.0
2000	4	2–2–0	0–1–0 lost to J. Inkster 5&4	2–0–0 won w/ J. Moodie 1 up, won w/ J. Moodie 1 up	0–1–0 lost w/ J. Moodie 2&1	2	50.0
2002	5	3–1–1	0–0–1 halved w/ W. Ward	2–0–0 won w/ C Koch 3&2, won w/ C. Koch 4&3	1–1–0 lost w/ M. Hjorth 2&1, won w/ C. Koch 4&3	3.5	70.0
2003	5	4–1–0	1–0–0 def. A. Stanford 3&2	2–0–0 won w/ S. Pettersen 4&3, won w/ C. Koch 3&2	1–1–0 lost w/ C. Koch 1 dn, won w/ S. Pettersen 1 up	4	80.0
2005	5	4–1–0	1–0–0 def B. Daniel 4&3	1–1–0 won w/ S. Pettersen 1 up, lost w/ C. Matthew 2 up	2–0–0 won w/ C. Matthew 2&1, won w/ L. Davies 4&2	4	80.0
2007	5	2–2–1	0–1–0 lost to M. Pressel 2&1	1–1–0 lost w/ C. Matthew 4&2, won w/ C. Matthew 1 up	1–0–1 halved w/ M. Hjorth, won w/ S. Pettersen 3&2	2.5	50.0

== Awards ==
1993

- LET Rookie of the Year

1994

- LPGA Rookie of the Year
- Elite Sign No. 98 by the Swedish Golf Federation, on the basis of national team appearances and national championship performances

1995

- Golf Writers Association of America Female Player of the Year
- LPGA Tour Player of the Year
- LPGA Tour Money Winner
- LPGA Vare Trophy
- LET Order of Merit
- LET Players' Player of the Year
- Svenska Dagbladet Gold Medal
- Swedish Golfer of the Year
- Jerringpriset Swedish Athlete of the Year
- Swedish Sportswomen of the Year by newspaper Aftonbladet and the Swedish Sports Confederation

1996

- LPGA Vare Trophy (2)
- Swedish Golfer of the Year (2)
- ESPY Awards Best Female Golfer

1997

- Golf Writers Association of America Female Player of the Year (2)
- LPGA Tour Player of the Year (2)
- LPGA Tour Money Winner (2)
- Swedish Golfer of the Year (3)

1998

- LPGA Tour Player of the Year (3)
- LPGA Tour Money Winner (3)
- LPGA Vare Trophy (3)
- Swedish Golfer of the Year (4)
- ESPY Awards Best Female Golfer (2)

1999

- ESPY Awards Best Female Golfer (3)

2001

- Golf Writers Association of America Female Player of the Year (3)
- LPGA Tour Player of the Year (4)
- LPGA Tour Money Winner (4)
- LPGA Vare Trophy (3)
- LPGA Crowne Plaza Achievement Award
- Swedish Golfer of the Year (5)

2002

- Golf Writers Association of America Female Player of the Year (4)
- LPGA Tour Player of the Year (5)
- LPGA Tour Money Winner (5)
- LPGA Vare Trophy (4)
- LPGA Crowne Plaza Achievement Award (2)
- Swedish Golfer of the Year (6)
- ESPY Awards Best Female Golfer (4)
- LET Players' Player of the Year (2)

2003

- World Golf Hall of Fame
- AP Female Athlete of the Year
- Golf Writers Association of America Female Player of the Year (5)
- LPGA Tour Player of the Year (6)
- LPGA Tour Money Winner (6)
- Patty Berg Award
- Association of European Golf Writers Golf Writers' Trophy
- Jerringpriset Swedish Athlete of the Year (2)
- Swedish Golfer of the Year (7)
- ESPY Awards Best Female Golfer (5)

2004

- AP Female Athlete of the Year (2)
- Laureus World Sports Awards Sportswoman of the Year
- Golf Writers Association of America Female Player of the Year (6)
- LPGA Tour Player of the Year (7)
- LPGA Tour Money Winner (7)
- Swedish Golfer of the Year (8)
- ESPY Awards Best Female Golfer (6)

2005

- AP Female Athlete of the Year (3)
- Golf Writers Association of America Female Player of the Year (7)
- LPGA Tour Player of the Year (8)
- LPGA Tour Money Winner (8)
- LPGA Vare Trophy (5)
- Association of European Golf Writers Golf Writers' Trophy (2)
- Swedish Golfer of the Year (9)
- ESPY Awards Best Female Athlete

2006

- ESPY Awards Best Female Athlete (2)

2009

- H. M. The King's Medal 8th size with blue ribbon

2010

- Francis Ouimet Award for Lifelong Contributions to Golf

2012

- Bob Jones Award

2014

- Old Tom Morris Award

2020

- Presidential Medal of Freedom Originally scheduled for 23 March 2020. Due to the coronavirus pandemic, the ceremony was rescheduled and held 7 January 2021.

== See also ==
- List of golfers with most Ladies European Tour wins
- List of golfers with most LPGA major championship wins
- List of golfers with most LPGA Tour wins
- Monday Night Golf
- Women's Career Grand Slam
- Lowest rounds of golf

Female golfers who have competed in men's PGA tournaments:

- Brittany Lincicome
- Lexi Thompson
- Suzy Whaley
- Michelle Wie
- Babe Didrikson Zaharias

== Notes and references ==
Awards and achievements
Preceded by (Sweden) Liselotte Neumann	LET Order of Merit; 1995	Succeeded by (England) Laura Davies
Preceded by Swedish national football team	Svenska Dagbladet Gold Medal; 1995	Succeeded by Agneta Andersson & Susanne Gunnarsson
