= 2002 LPGA Tour =

Golf tour season

2002 LPGA Tour season
- Duration: February 28, 2002 – November 24, 2002
- Number of official events: 32
- Most wins: 11 (Sweden) Annika Sörenstam
- Money leader: (Sweden) Annika Sörenstam
- Rolex Player of the Year: (Sweden) Annika Sörenstam
- Vare Trophy: (Sweden) Annika Sörenstam
- Rookie of the Year: (United States) Beth Bauer

The 2002 LPGA Tour was the 53rd season since the LPGA Tour officially began in 1950. The season ran from February 28 to November 24, consisting of 32 official money events. Annika Sörenstam won the most tournaments, 11. She also led the money list with earnings of $2,863,904. She broke the LPGA Tour single-season earnings and scoring average (68.70) records she had set the previous season.

The season saw the first tournament with a $3,000,000 purse, the U.S. Women's Open. There were three first-time winners in 2002: Laura Diaz, Cristie Kerr, and Patricia Meunier-Lebouc.

The tournament results, leaders, and award winners are listed below.

== Tournament results ==
The following table shows all the official money events for the 2002 season. "Date" is the ending date of the tournament. The numbers in parentheses after the winners' names are the number of wins they had on the tour up to and including that event. Majors are shown in bold.

Date	Tournament	Location	Winner	Score	Purse ($)	1st prize ($)
Mar 2	LPGA Takefuji Classic	Hawaii	(Sweden) Annika Sörenstam (32)	196 (−14)	900,000	135,000
Mar 17	PING Banner Health	Arizona	(Australia) Rachel Teske (5)	281 (−7)	1,000,000	150,000
Mar 24	Welch's/Circle K Championship	Arizona	(United States) Laura Diaz (1)	270 (−18)	800,000	120,000
Mar 31	**Kraft Nabisco Championship**	California	(Sweden) **Annika Sörenstam (33)**	280 (−8)	1,500,000	225,000
Apr 7	The Office Depot Championship	California	(South Korea) Se Ri Pak (14)	209 (−7)	1,000,000	150,000
Apr 21	Longs Drugs Challenge	California	(United States) Cristie Kerr (1)	280 (−8)	900,000	135,000
May 5	Chick-fil-A Charity Championship	Georgia	(United States) Juli Inkster (27)	132 (−12)^	1,250,000	187,500
May 12	Aerus Electrolux USA Championship	Tennessee	(Sweden) Annika Sörenstam (34)	271 (−17)	800,000	120,000
May 19	Asahi Ryokuken International Championship	South Carolina	(Scotland) Janice Moodie (2)	273 (−15)	1,250,000	187,500
May 26	LPGA Corning Classic	New York	(United States) Laura Diaz (2)	274 (−14)	1,000,000	150,000
Jun 2	Kellogg-Keebler Classic	Illinois	(Sweden) Annika Sörenstam (35)	195 (−21)	1,200,000	180,000
Jun 9	**McDonald's LPGA Championship**	Delaware	(South Korea) **Se Ri Pak (15)**	279 (−5)	1,500,000	225,000
Jun 15	Evian Masters	France	(Sweden) Annika Sörenstam (36)	269 (−19)	2,100,000	315,000
Jun 23	Wegmans Rochester LPGA	New York	(Australia) Karrie Webb (27)	276 (−12)	1,200,000	180,000
Jun 30	ShopRite LPGA Classic	New Jersey	(Sweden) Annika Sörenstam (37)	201 (−12)	1,200,000	180,000
Jul 7	**U.S. Women's Open**	Kansas	(United States) **Juli Inkster (28)**	276 (−4)	3,000,000	535,000
Jul 14	Jamie Farr Kroger Classic	Ohio	(Australia) Rachel Teske (6)	270 (−14)	1,000,000	150,000
Jul 21	Giant Eagle LPGA Classic	Ohio	(South Korea) Mi Hyun Kim (4)	202 (−14)	1,000,000	150,000
Jul 28	Sybase Big Apple Classic	New York	(South Korea) Gloria Park (2)	270 (−14)	950,000	142,500
Aug 4	Wendy's Championship for Children	Ohio	(South Korea) Mi Hyun Kim (5)	208 (−8)	1,000,000	150,000
Aug 11	**Weetabix Women's British Open**	Scotland	(Australia) **Karrie Webb (28)**	273 (−15)	1,500,000	236,383
Aug 18	Bank of Montreal Canadian Women's Open	Canada	(United States) Meg Mallon (14)	284 (-4)	1,200,000	180,000
Aug 25	First Union Betsy King Classic	Pennsylvania	(South Korea) Se Ri Pak (16)	267 (−21)	1,200,000	180,000
Sep 1	State Farm Classic	Illinois	(France) Patricia Meunier-Lebouc (1)	270 (−18)	1,100,000	165,000
Sep 8	Williams Championship	Oklahoma	(Sweden) Annika Sörenstam (38)	199 (−11)	1,000,000	150,000
Sep 15	Safeway Classic	Oregon	(Sweden) Annika Sörenstam (39)	199 (−17)	1,000,000	150,000
Oct 6	Samsung World Championship	California	(Sweden) Annika Sörenstam (40)	266 (−22)	775,000	162,000
Oct 13	Mobile LPGA Tournament of Champions	Alabama	(South Korea) Se Ri Pak (17)	268 (−20)	750,000	122,000
Oct 27	Sports Today CJ Nine Bridges Classic	South Korea	(South Korea) Se Ri Pak (18)	213 (−3)	1,500,000	225,000
Nov 3	Cisco World Ladies Match Play Championship	Japan	(South Korea) Grace Park (3)	22 holes	1,020,000	153,000
Nov 10	Mizuno Classic	Japan	(Sweden) Annika Sörenstam (41)	201 (−15)	1,130,000	169,500
Nov 24	ADT Championship	Florida	(Sweden) Annika Sörenstam (42)	275 (−13)	1,000,000	215,000

^ – weather-shortened tournament

== Leaders ==
Money List leaders

Rank	Player	Country	Earnings ($)	Events
1	Annika Sörenstam	Sweden	2,863,904	23
2	Se Ri Pak	South Korea	1,722,281	24
3	Juli Inkster	United States	1,154,349	20
4	Mi Hyun Kim	South Korea	1,049,993	28
5	Karrie Webb	Australia	1,009,760	21
6	Grace Park	South Korea	861,943	28
7	Laura Diaz	United States	843,790	25
8	Carin Koch	Sweden	785,817	25
9	Rachel Teske	Australia	779,329	27
10	Rosie Jones	United States	722,412	24

== Awards ==
Award	Winner	Country
Money winner	Annika Sörenstam (5)	Sweden
Scoring leader (Vare Trophy)	Annika Sörenstam (5)	Sweden
Player of the Year	Annika Sörenstam (5)	Sweden
Rookie of the Year	Beth Bauer	United States
