= 2003 LPGA Tour =

Golf tour season

2003 LPGA Tour season
- Duration: March 16, 2003 – November 23, 2003
- Number of official events: 31
- Most wins: 6 (Sweden) Annika Sörenstam
- Money leader: (Sweden) Annika Sörenstam
- Rolex Player of the Year: (Sweden) Annika Sörenstam
- Vare Trophy: (South Korea) Pak Se-ri
- Rookie of the Year: (Mexico) Lorena Ochoa

The 2003 LPGA Tour was the 54th season since the LPGA Tour officially began in 1950. The season ran from March 13 to November 23. The season consisted of 31 official money events. Annika Sörenstam won the most tournaments, six. She also led the money list with earnings of $2,029,506.

There were five first-time winners in 2003: Shi Hyun Ahn, Hee-Won Han, Candie Kung, Hilary Lunke, and Angela Stanford. Lunke's was most notable, as she won the U.S. Women's Open after enduring local and section qualifying for what would become her only LPGA Tour victory.

The tournament results, leaders, and award winners are listed below.

== Tournament results ==
The following table shows all the official money events for the 2003 season. "Date" is the ending date of the tournament. The numbers in parentheses after the winners' names are the number of wins they had on the tour up to and including that event. Majors are shown in bold.

Date	Tournament	Location	Winner	Score	Purse ($)	1st prize ($)
Mar 16	Welch's/Fry's Championship	Arizona	(Australia) Wendy Doolan (2)	259 (−21)	800,000	120,000
Mar 23	Safeway PING	Arizona	(South Korea) Se Ri Pak (19)	265 (−23)	1,000,000	150,000
Mar 30	**Kraft Nabisco Championship**	California	(France) **Patricia Meunier-Lebouc (2)**	281 (−7)	1,600,000	240,000
Apr 6	The Office Depot Championship	California	(Sweden) Annika Sörenstam (43)	211 (−5)	1,500,000	225,000
Apr 19	LPGA Takefuji Classic	Nevada	(Taiwan) Candie Kung (1)	204 (−12)	1,100,000	165,000
Apr 27	Chick-fil-A Charity Championship	Georgia	(South Korea) Se Ri Pak (20)	200 (−16)	1,350,000	202,500
May 4	Michelob Light Open at Kingsmill	Virginia	(South Korea) Grace Park (4)	275 (−9)	1,600,000	240,000
May 12	Asahi Ryokuken International Championship	South Carolina	(United States) Rosie Jones (13)	273 (−15)	1,300,000	195,000
May 25	LPGA Corning Classic	New York	(United States) Juli Inkster (29)	264 (−24)	1,000,000	150,000
Jun 1	Kellogg-Keebler Classic	Illinois	(Sweden) Annika Sörenstam (44)	199 (−17)	1,200,000	180,000
Jun 8	**McDonald's LPGA Championship**	Delaware	(Sweden) **Annika Sörenstam (45)**	278 (−6)	1,600,000	240,000
Jun 15	Giant Eagle LPGA Classic	Ohio	(Australia) Rachel Teske (7)	204 (−12)	1,000,000	150,000
Jun 22	Wegmans Rochester LPGA	New York	(Australia) Rachel Teske (8)	277 (−11)	1,200,000	180,000
Jun 29	ShopRite LPGA Classic	New Jersey	(United States) Angela Stanford (1)	197 (−16)	1,300,000	195,000
Jul 6	**U.S. Women's Open**	Oregon	(United States) **Hilary Lunke (1)**	283 (−1)	3,100,000	560,000
Jul 13	BMO Financial Group Canadian Women's Open	Canada	(United States) Beth Daniel (33)	275 (−13)	1,300,000	195,000
Jul 20	Sybase Big Apple Classic	New York	(South Korea) Hee-Won Han (1)	273 (−11)	950,000	142,500
Jul 26	Evian Masters	France	(United States) Juli Inkster (30)	265 (−21)	2,100,000	315,000
Aug 3	**Weetabix Women's British Open**	England	(Sweden) **Annika Sörenstam (46)**	278 (−10)	1,600,000	254,880
Aug 10	Wendy's Championship for Children	Ohio	(South Korea) Hee-Won Han (2)	199 (−17)	1,100,000	165,000
Aug 17	Jamie Farr Kroger Classic	Ohio	(South Korea) Se Ri Pak (21)	271 (−13)	1,000,000	150,000
Aug 24	Wachovia LPGA Classic	Pennsylvania	(Taiwan) Candie Kung (2)	274 (−14)	1,200,000	180,000
Aug 31	State Farm Classic	Illinois	(Taiwan) Candie Kung (3)	202 (−14)	1,200,000	180,000
Sep 7	John Q. Hammons Hotel Classic	Oklahoma	(Australia) Karrie Webb (29)	200 (−10)	1,000,000	150,000
Sep 28	Safeway Classic	Oregon	(Sweden) Annika Sörenstam (47)	201 (−15)	1,200,000	180,000
Oct 5	Longs Drugs Challenge	California	(Sweden) Helen Alfredsson (5)	275 (−13)	1,000,000	150,000
Oct 12	Samsung World Championship	Texas	(Sweden) Sophie Gustafson (4)	274 (−14)	800,000	200,000
Nov 2	CJ Nine Bridges Classic	South Korea	(South Korea) Shi Hyun Ahn (1*)	204 (−12)	1,250,000	187,500
Nov 9	Mizuno Classic	Japan	(Sweden) Annika Sörenstam (48)	192 (−24)	1,130,000	169,500
Nov 16	Mobile LPGA Tournament of Champions	Alabama	(United States) Dorothy Delasin (4)	280 (−8)	750,000	122,000
Nov 23	ADT Championship	Florida	(United States) Meg Mallon (15)	281 (−7)	1,000,000	215,000

* – non-member at time of win

== Leaders ==
Money List leaders

Rank	Player	Country	Earnings ($)	Events
1	Annika Sörenstam	Sweden	2,029,506	17
2	Se Ri Pak	South Korea	1,611,928	26
3	Grace Park	South Korea	1,417,702	26
4	Hee-Won Han	South Korea	1,111,860	27
5	Juli Inkster	United States	1,028,205	21
6	Candie Kung	Taiwan	938,079	30
7	Rachel Teske	Australia	924,667	27
8	Beth Daniel	United States	917,654	22
9	Lorena Ochoa	Mexico	823,740	24
10	Rosie Jones	United States	808,785	20

== Awards ==
Award	Winner	Country
Money winner	Annika Sörenstam (6)	Sweden
Scoring leader (Vare Trophy)	Se Ri Pak	South Korea
Player of the Year	Annika Sörenstam (6)	Sweden
Rookie of the Year	Lorena Ochoa	Mexico
