= 1998 LPGA Tour =

Golf tour season

1998 LPGA Tour season
- Duration: January 16, 1998 – November 22, 1998
- Number of official events: 36
- Most wins: 4 (South Korea) Pak Se-ri, (Sweden) Annika Sörenstam
- Money leader: (Sweden) Annika Sörenstam
- Rolex Player of the Year: (Sweden) Annika Sörenstam
- Vare Trophy: (Sweden) Annika Sörenstam
- Rookie of the Year: (South Korea) Pak Se-ri

The 1998 LPGA Tour was the 49th season since the LPGA Tour officially began in 1950. The season ran from January 16 to November 22. The season consisted of 36 official money events. Se Ri Pak and Annika Sörenstam won the most tournaments, four each. Annika Sörenstam led the money list with earnings of $1,092,748. She also won the Vare Trophy for lowest scoring average, becoming the first to break 70 with an average of 69.99.

This was the first year that non-American winners outnumbered American winners (19 to 17). There were four first-time winners in 1998: Amy Fruhwirth, Rachel Hetherington, Se Ri Pak, Pearl Sinn.

The tournament results and award winners are listed below.

== Tournament results ==
The following table shows all the official money events for the 1998 season. "Date" is the ending date of the tournament. The numbers in parentheses after the winners' names are the number of wins they had on the tour up to and including that event. Majors are shown in bold.

Date	Tournament	Location	Winner	Score	Purse ($)	1st prize ($)
Jan 18	HealthSouth Inaugural	Florida	(United States) Kelly Robbins (7)	209 (−7)	600,000	90,000
Jan 25	The Office Depot	Florida	(Sweden) Helen Alfredsson (3)	277 (−11)	600,000	90,000
Feb 15	Los Angeles Women's Championship	California	(United States) Dale Eggeling (3)	141 (−3)^	650,000	97,500
Feb 21	Cup Noodles Hawaiian Ladies Open	Hawaii	(United States) Wendy Ward (2)	204 (−12)	650,000	97,500
Mar 1	Australian Ladies Masters	Australia	(Australia) Karrie Webb (9)	272 (−16)	700,000	105,000
Mar 15	Welch's/Circle K Championship	Arizona	(Sweden) Helen Alfredsson (4)	274 (−14)	500,000	75,000
Mar 22	Standard Register PING	Arizona	(Sweden) Liselotte Neumann (11)	279 (−13)	850,000	127,500
Mar 29	**Nabisco Dinah Shore**	California	(United States) **Pat Hurst (2)**	281 (−7)	1,000,000	105,000
Apr 5	Longs Drugs Challenge	California	(United States) Donna Andrews (6)	278 (−10)	600,000	90,000
Apr 19	City of Hope Myrtle Beach Classic	South Carolina	(Australia) Karrie Webb (10)	269 (−19)	600,000	90,000
Apr 26	Chick-fil-A Charity Championship	Georgia	(Sweden) Liselotte Neumann (12)	202 (−14)	700,000	105,000
May 3	Mercury Titleholders Championship	Florida	(United States) Danielle Ammaccapane (6)	276 (−12)	1,000,000	150,000
May 10	Sara Lee Classic	Tennessee	(United States) Barb Mucha (5)	205 (−11)	750,000	112,500
May 17	**McDonald's LPGA Championship**	Delaware	(South Korea) **Se Ri Pak (1)**	273 (−11)	1,300,000	195,000
May 24	LPGA Corning Classic	New York	(United States) Tammie Green (7)	268 (−20)	700,000	105,000
May 31	Wegmans Rochester International	New York	(United States) Rosie Jones (9)	279 (−9)	700,000	105,000
Jun 7	Michelob Light Classic	Missouri	(Sweden) Annika Sörenstam (13)	208 (−8)	600,000	90,000
Jun 14	Oldsmobile Classic	Michigan	(Canada) Lisa Walters (3)	265 (−23)	650,000	97,500
Jun 21	Friendly's Classic	Massachusetts	(United States) Amy Fruhwirth (1)	208 (−8)	600,000	90,000
Jun 28	ShopRite LPGA Classic	New Jersey	(Sweden) Annika Sörenstam (14)	196 (−17)	1,000,000	150,000
Jul 5	**U.S. Women's Open**	Wisconsin	(South Korea) **Se Ri Pak (2)**	290 (+6)	1,500,000	267,500
Jul 12	Jamie Farr Kroger Classic	Ohio	(South Korea) Se Ri Pak (3)	261 (−23)	800,000	120,000
Jul 19	JAL Big Apple Classic	New York	(Sweden) Annika Sörenstam (15)	265 (−19)	775,000	116,250
Jul 26	Giant Eagle LPGA Classic	Ohio	(South Korea) Se Ri Pak (4)	201 (−15)	800,000	120,000
Aug 2	**du Maurier Classic**	Canada	(United States) **Brandie Burton (5)**	270 (−18)	1,200,000	180,000
Aug 9	Star Bank LPGA Classic	Ohio	(United States) Meg Mallon (9)	199 (−17)	600,000	90,000
Aug 16	Weetabix Women's British Open	England	(United States) Sherri Steinhauer (3)	292 (+4)	1,000,000	162,000
Aug 23	Rainbow Foods LPGA Classic	Minnesota	(Japan) Hiromi Kobayashi (3)	206 (−10)	600,000	90,000
Aug 30	State Farm Rail Classic	Illinois	(United States) Pearl Sinn (1)	200 (−16)	700,000	105,000
Sep 6	Safeway LPGA Golf Championship	Oregon	(United States) Danielle Ammaccapane (7)	204 (−12)	600,000	90,000
Sep 13	Safeco Classic	Washington	(Sweden) Annika Sörenstam (16)	273 (−15)	600,000	90,000
Sep 27	First Union Betsy King Classic	Pennsylvania	(Australia) Rachel Hetherington (1)	274 (−14)	650,000	97,500
Oct 11	Lifetime's AFLAC Tournament of Champions	Alabama	(United States) Kelly Robbins (8)	276 (−12)	750,000	122,000
Oct 25	Samsung World Championship of Women's Golf	Florida	(United States) Juli Inkster (17)	275 (−13)	550,000	137,000
Nov 8	Japan Classic	Japan	(Japan) Hiromi Kobayashi (4)	205 (−11)	800,000	120,000
Nov 22	PageNet Tour Championship	Nevada	(England) Laura Davies (17)	277 (−11)	1,000,000	215,000

^ – weather-shortened tournament

== Awards ==
Award	Winner	Country
Money winner	Annika Sörenstam (3)	Sweden
Scoring leader (Vare Trophy)	Annika Sörenstam (3)	Sweden
Player of the Year	Annika Sörenstam (3)	Sweden
Rookie of the Year	Se Ri Pak	South Korea
