= Mi-Hyun Kim =

South Korean professional golfer (born 1977)

Mi-Hyun Kim 김미현
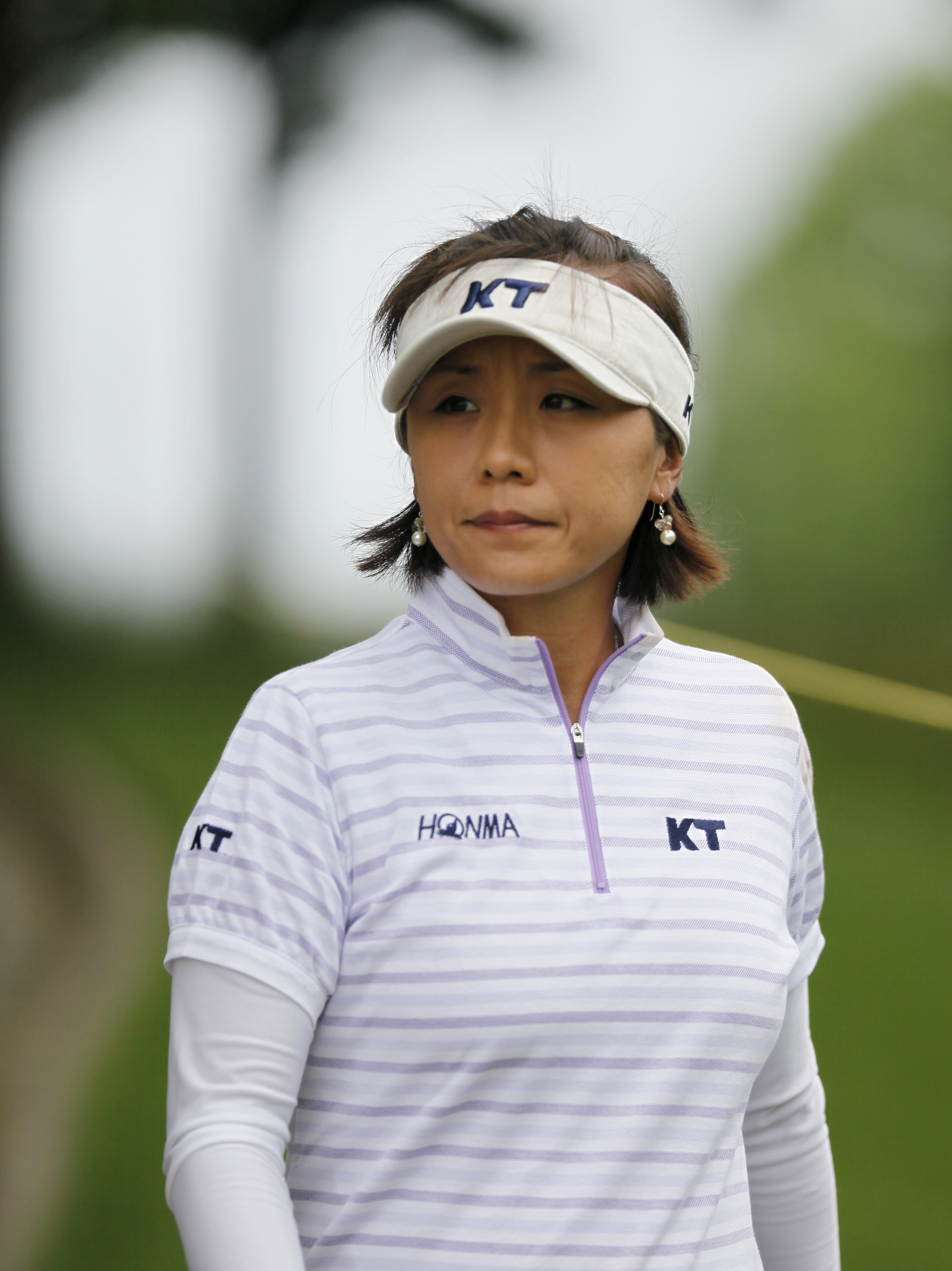
- Kim at the 2009 LPGA Championship

Personal information
- Nicknames: Peanut, Kimmie
- Nationality: South Korea
- Born: 13 January 1977 (age 49) Incheon, South Korea
- Height: 5 ft 1 in (155 cm)
- Spouse: Lee Won-hee (m. 2008; div. 2012)

Career
- Sport: Golf
- College: Sungkyunkwan University
- Turned professional: 1996
- Former tours: LPGA of Korea Tour (joined 1996); LPGA Tour (joined 1999)
- Professional wins: 21

Number of wins by tour
- LPGA Tour: 8
- LPGA of Korea Tour: 13

Best results in LPGA major championships
- Chevron Championship: T5: 2005
- Women's PGA C'ship: T3: 2006
- U.S. Women's Open: T4: 2000
- du Maurier Classic: T6: 1999
- Women's British Open: 2nd: 2001

Achievements and awards
- LPGA Rookie of the Year: 1999

- Korean name
- Hangul: 김미현
- Hanja: 金美賢
- RR: Gim Mihyeon
- MR: Kim Mihyŏn

Mi-Hyun Kim (Korean: 김미현; born 13 January 1977) is a professional golfer from South Korea. She turned professional in 1996 and won 11 events on the LPGA of Korea Tour (KLPGA) between 1996 and 2000. In 1999, she joined the LPGA Tour and was named was Rookie of the Year that year. She has won eight LPGA events with her best finish in a major championship second place at the 2001 Women's British Open.

== Background ==
Born in Incheon, Kim received the nicknamed "Peanut" because she stands only 5 feet 1 inch (155 cm) tall. LPGA golfers also refer to her as "Kimmy." She was inspired to move to the United States by Se Ri Pak, and they along with Grace Park and Hee-Won Han – the four nicknamed the "Seoul Sisters" – are considered pioneers in the surge of outstanding South Korean women's golfers on the LPGA Tour. Her swing is characterized by an unusually long backswing that has become shorter in recent years.

== Charitable giving ==
In May 2007, Kim donated $100,000 of her $210,000 prize money from winning the SemGroup Championship to victims of a recent tornado that severely damaged the town of Greensburg, Kansas. The tornado occurred during the SemGroup tournament.

Kim did not have any connection to Greensburg or any of its residents. Commenting on her donation, she said, "Honestly, I made a lot of money in the United States on the LPGA Tour. Most of time, I get the money here and donate to South Korea. But, I want to help people here, too. The win was a surprise for me and I think God gave it to me like a special present or he is using me like, 'okay, I give you this, but after that you give to help the people.'"

A year later on the eve on the 2008 SemGroup Championship, the president of the United Way of the Plains in Wichita, Kansas appeared with Kim at the pre-tournament press conference to publicly thank her and announce that the publicity surrounding Kim's donation had spurred further donations totaling $1.2 million and that money is being used to build 25 homes for low- and moderate-income individuals displaced by the tornado.

== Personal ==
Kim retired from the LPGA Tour after playing several tournaments during the 2011 season. In December 2008 she married Lee Won-hee, a former Olympic gold medalist in judo who now teaches judo at a university in South Korea. In 2009 they had a son, Ye Sung Lee, who was born in Orlando, Florida. The couple divorced in 2012.

She currently teaches golf in South Korea. A golf teaching/practice facility built by her father is named the Mi-Hyun Kim Golf World.

== Professional wins (19) ==
=== LPGA Tour (8) ===
No.	Date	Tournament	Winning score	Margin of victory	Runner(s)-up
1	6 Sep 1999	State Farm Rail Classic	-12 (66-68-70=204)	1 stroke	(Scotland) Janice Moodie (United States) Pearl Sinn
2	10 Oct 1999	First Union Betsy King Classic	-8 (68-72-70-70=280)	1 stroke	(United States) Beth Daniel (England) Helen Dobson (Peru) (Sweden) Jenny Lidback
3	24 Sep 2000	Safeway LPGA Golf Championship	-1 (70-73-72=215)	Playoff	(South Korea) Jeong Jang
4	21 Jul 2002	Giant Eagle LPGA Classic	-14 (65-68-69=202)	1 stroke	(United States) Kelly Robbins
5	4 Aug 2002	Wendy's Championship for Children	-8 (68-67-73=208)	1 stroke	(South Korea) Hee-Won Han
6	30 Apr 2006	Ginn Clubs & Resorts Open	-12 (70-66-69-71=276)	2 strokes	(Mexico) Lorena Ochoa (Australia) Karrie Webb
7	16 Jul 2006	Jamie Farr Owens Corning Classic	-18 (68-66-67-65=266)	Playoff	(United States) Natalie Gulbis
8	6 May 2007	SemGroup Championship	-3 (71-68-71=210)	Playoff	(United States) Juli Inkster

LPGA Tour playoff record (3–3)

No.	Year	Tournament	Opponent(s)	Result
1	2000	Safeway LPGA Golf Championship	(South Korea) Jeong Jang	Won with par on second extra hole
2	2000	New Albany Golf Classic	(Canada) Lorie Kane	Lost to birdie on first extra hole
3	2001	The Office Depot	(Sweden) Annika Sörenstam	Lost to par on first extra hole
4	2001	Kathy Ireland Championship	(United States) Rosie Jones	Lost to birdie on first extra hole
5	2006	Jamie Farr Owens Corning Classic	(United States) Natalie Gulbis	Won with birdie on third extra hole
6	2007	SemGroup Championship	(United States) Juli Inkster	Won with par on first extra hole

=== LPGA of Korea Tour wins (13) ===
No.	Date	Tournament	Winning score	To par	Margin of victory	Runner-up
1	30 Apr 1994	Tomboy Women's Open (as an amateur)	72-74-72=218	+2	2 strokes	(South Korea) Kang Soo-yun (amateur)
2	15 Jul 1995	**Fursys Cup Korea Women's Open** (as an amateur)	71-71-68=210	−6	2 strokes	(South Korea) Se Ri Pak (amateur)
3	29 Jun 1996	Midopa Women's Open	69-69=138	-6	2 strokes	(South Korea) Song Chae-eun (South Korea) Ha Nan-kyung
4	18 Aug 1996	Korea Oil Corporation Invitational	67-74-65=206	−10	2 strokes	(South Korea) Se Ri Pak
5	25 Oct 1996	**LG Fashion Cup Korea Women's Open**	70-74-72=216	E	2 strokes	(South Korea) Se Ri Pak
6	31 Aug 1997	Korea Oil Corporation Invitational	71-74-68=213	−3	1 stroke	(South Korea) Il Mi Chung
7	7 Sep 1997	FILA Women's Open	73-68-70=211	−10	1 stroke	(South Korea) Gloria Park (amateur)
8	13 Sep 1997	Lacoste SBS Champions	73-75-74=222	+6	3 strokes	(South Korea) Han Ji-yeon (South Korea) Seo A-ram
9	9 May 1998	Carnation Women's Open	70-73-67=210	−6	7 strokes	(South Korea) Jeong Jang (amateur)
10	11 Sep 1998	SBS Champions	72-74-74=220	+4	Playoff	(South Korea) Il Mi Chung
11	1 Nov 1998	KLPGA Championship	72-76-71=219	+3	2 strokes	(South Korea) Seo Ji-hyun
12	29 Oct 2000	Sports Seoul Hyundai Securities Women's Open	71-68-68=207	−9	4 strokes	(England) Laura Davies
13	3 Dec 2000	Paradise Women's Open	71-73-63=207	−9	10 strokes	(South Korea) Il Mi Chung

Tournaments in bold denotes major tournaments in KLPGA

== Results in LPGA majors ==
Tournament	1998	1999	2000
Kraft Nabisco Championship			T47
LPGA Championship		T26	T12
U.S. Women's Open	CUT		T4
du Maurier Classic		T6	T33

Tournament	2001	2002	2003	2004	2005	2006	2007	2008	2009	2010	2011
Kraft Nabisco Championship	T15	T21	T57	7	T5	T42	T30	T6	T48	T56	T33
LPGA Championship	8	T33	T30	T30	T7	T3	T15	T10	CUT	T42	T43
U.S. Women's Open	T26	T22	T30	T16	T31	T41	T8	T6			CUT
Women's British Open ^	2	T61	CUT	CUT	CUT	CUT	CUT	T24		T31	CUT

^ The Women's British Open replaced the du Maurier Classic as an LPGA major in 2001.

Top 10
Did not play

CUT = missed the half-way cut
"T" tied

=== Summary ===
Tournament	Wins	2nd	3rd	Top-5	Top-10	Top-25	Events	Cuts made
Kraft Nabisco Championship	0	0	0	1	3	5	12	12
LPGA Championship	0	0	1	1	4	6	13	12
U.S. Women's Open	0	0	0	1	3	5	11	9
du Maurier Classic	0	0	0	0	1	1	2	2
Women's British Open	0	1	0	1	1	2	10	4
Totals	0	1	1	4	12	19	48	39

== Team appearances ==
Amateur

- Espirito Santo Trophy (representing South Korea): 1994
