= 2005 Kraft Nabisco Championship =

2005 women's golf tournament

Coordinates: 33.798°N 116.433°W

Tournament information
- Dates: March 24–27, 2005
- Location: Rancho Mirage, California
- Courses: Mission Hills Country Club; Dinah Shore Tourn. Course
- Tour: LPGA Tour
- Format: Stroke play - 72 holes

Statistics
- Par: 72
- Length: 6,535 yards (5,976 m)
- Field: 98 players, 75 after cut
- Cut: 153 (+9)
- Prize fund: $1.8 million
- Winner's share: $270,000

Champion
- (Sweden) Annika Sörenstam
- 273 (−15)

Location in the United States
Location in California

The 2005 Kraft Nabisco Championship was a women's professional golf tournament, held March 24–27 at Mission Hills Country Club in Rancho Mirage, California. This was the 34th edition of the Kraft Nabisco Championship, and the 23rd edition as a major championship. ESPN and ABC Sports televised the event.

Annika Sörenstam, the champion in 2001 and 2002, won the event for the third and final time, eight strokes ahead of runner-up Rosie Jones. It was the eighth of her ten major titles.

== Final leaderboard ==
Sunday, March 27, 2005

| Place | Player | Score | To par | Money ($) |
|---|---|---|---|---|
| 1 | (Sweden) Annika Sörenstam | 70-69-66-68=273 | −15 | 270,000 |
| 2 | (United States) Rosie Jones | 69-70-71-71=281 | −7 | 166,003 |
| T3 | (United States) Laura Diaz | 75-69-71-68=283 | −5 | 106,791 |
| T3 | (United States) Cristie Kerr | 72-70-70-71=283 | −5 | 106,791 |
| T5 | (South Korea) Mi Hyun Kim | 69-71-72-72=284 | −4 | 68,165 |
| T5 | (South Korea) Grace Park | 73-68-76-67=284 | −4 | 68,165 |
| 7 | (United States) Juli Inkster | 70-74-72-69=285 | −3 | 51,350 |
| 8 | (Canada) Lorie Kane | 71-76-69-70=286 | −2 | 44,988 |
| T9 | (United States) Beth Daniel | 74-72-69-72=287 | −1 | 34,591 |
| T9 | (United States) Dorothy Delasin | 71-72-73-71=287 | −1 | 34,591 |
| T9 | (Australia) Wendy Doolan | 74-69-73-71=287 | −1 | 34,591 |
| T9 | (United States) Candie Kung | 72-73-71-71=287 | −1 | 34,591 |
| T9 | (United States) Reilley Rankin | 73-68-74-72=287 | −1 | 34,591 |

Amateurs: Wie (E), Pressel (+2), Granada (+6), Park (+10).
