= Isabelle Beisiegel =

Canadian professional golfer (born 1979)

Personal information
- Nickname: Izzy
- Nationality: Canada
- Born: February 6, 1979 (age 47)
- Height: 5 ft 8 in (1.73 m)

Career
- Sport: Golf
- College: University of Oklahoma
- Turned professional: 2001
- Former tours: LPGA Tour; Canadian Tour

Best results in LPGA major championships
- Chevron Championship: DNP
- Women's PGA C'ship: T70: 2004
- U.S. Women's Open: T36: 1998
- du Maurier Classic: DNP
- Women's British Open: CUT: 2004
- Evian Championship: DNP

Isabelle "Izzy" Beisiegel (née Blais, born February 6, 1979), is a professional golfer from Quebec, Canada.

== Early life and amateur career ==
Beisiegel was born in Quebec, Canada in 1979.

Beisiegel attended the University of Oklahoma. During the 1997–98 academic year, she earned NCAA All-American honors. In addition, as an amateur Beisiegel tied for 36th at the 1998 U.S. Women's Open.

== Professional career ==
In 2001, Beisiegel turned professional. She was medalist at 2003 LPGA qualifying school. In April 2004, Beisiegel played the Office Depot Championship at El Caballero Country Club in Los Angeles, California. She shot an LPGA course record of 65 in the final round. She finished just outside the top ten, in 11th place. In June, at the Kellogg-Keebler Classic, Beisiegel earned her first LPGA top-10 (7th place).

Beisiegel has also played in some men's golf tournaments. In 2004, she attended PGA Tour Qualifying School becoming the first woman to compete in the event. Beisiegel was quoted as saying, "The ball doesn't know if it is a man or a woman who is hitting it." She earned her Canadian Tour card for 2011, becoming the first female player to earn a playing card on a men's professional golf tour. However, Beisiegel did not make the cut in any of the six tour events she played, and lost the card after the 2011 season. In 2012, she attempted to qualify for the 2012 U.S. Open. At the local qualifier, held at Miramont Country Club in College Station, Texas, she shot a 74 and finished in the top third of the field (39th place).

== Personal life ==
On February 29, 2000, Beisiegel married former University of Oklahoma football defensive back Dan Beisiegel. She lives in Broken Arrow, Oklahoma.

== Awards and honors ==
In 1997–98, during Beisiegel's freshman year at the University of Oklahoma, she earned NCAA All-American honors.
