= 2001 Nabisco Championship =

Coordinates: 33.798°N 116.433°W

Tournament information
- Dates: March 22–25, 2001
- Location: Rancho Mirage, California
- Courses: Mission Hills Country Club; Dinah Shore Tourn. Course
- Tour: LPGA Tour
- Format: Stroke play - 72 holes

Statistics
- Par: 72
- Length: 6,520 yards (5,962 m)
- Field: 95 players, 74 after cut
- Cut: 151 (+7)
- Prize fund: $1.5 million
- Winner's share: $225,000

Champion
- (Sweden) Annika Sörenstam
- 281 (−7)

Location in the United States
Location in California

The 2001 Nabisco Championship was a women's professional golf tournament, held March 22–25 at Mission Hills Country Club in Rancho Mirage, California. This was the thirtieth edition of the Kraft Nabisco Championship, and the nineteenth as a major championship.

Annika Sörenstam shot a final round 69 to win the first of her three titles at this event, three strokes ahead of five runners-up; it was the third of her ten major titles. She won eight times on tour in 2001 and this was the third in a streak of four consecutive; she successfully defended this title the following year.

== Final leaderboard ==
Sunday, March 25, 2001

| Place | Player | Score | To par | Money ($) |
|---|---|---|---|---|
| 1 | (Sweden) Annika Sörenstam | 72-70-70-69=281 | −7 | 225,000 |
| T2 | (Japan) Akiko Fukushima | 74-68-70-72=284 | −4 | 87,557 |
| T2 | (Australia) Rachel Teske | 72-73-66-73=284 | −4 | 87,557 |
| T2 | (Scotland) Janice Moodie | 72-72-70-70=284 | −4 | 87,557 |
| T2 | (United States) Dottie Pepper | 71-71-71-71=284 | −4 | 87,557 |
| T2 | (Australia) Karrie Webb | 73-72-70-69=284 | −4 | 87,557 |
| T7 | (United States) Brandie Burton | 74-69-72-70=285 | −3 | 41,891 |
| T7 | (Sweden) Sophie Gustafson | 72-74-70-69=285 | −3 | 41,891 |
| T9 | (United States) Laura Diaz | 71-74-69-72=286 | −2 | 33,589 |
| T9 | (United States) Pat Hurst | 70-68-74-74=286 | −2 | 33,589 |

Amateurs: Lorena Ochoa (+2), Aree Song (+12), Naree Song (+12).
