= Wachovia LPGA Classic =

American women's golf tournament

The Wachovia LPGA Classic was an annual women's professional golf tournament on the LPGA Tour that took place at the Berkleigh Country Club in Kutztown, Pennsylvania from 1996 through 2004. Betsy King, LPGA Tour player and native of nearby Reading, served as the tournament host. Tournament names through the years:

- 1996–1997: CoreStates Betsy King Classic
- 1998–2002: First Union Betsy King Classic
- 2003–2004: Wachovia LPGA Classic Hosted by Betsy King

== Winners ==
Year	Dates	Champion	Country	Score	Purse ($)	Winner's share ($)
2004	Aug 26–29	Lorena Ochoa	Mexico	269 (−19)	1,000,000	150,000
2003	Aug 21–24	Candie Kung	Taiwan	274 (−14)	1,200,000	180,000
2002	Aug 22–25	Se Ri Pak	South Korea	267 (−21)	1,200,000	180,000
2001	Aug 23–26	Heather Daly-Donofrio	United States	273 (−15)	800,000	120,000
2000^{1}	Sep 8–10	Michele Redman	United States	202 (−14)	800,000	120,000
1999	Oct 7–10	Mi Hyun Kim	South Korea	280 (−8)	725,000	108,750
1998	Sep 24–27	Rachel Hetherington	Australia	274 (−14)	650,000	97,500
1997	Oct 2–5	Annika Sörenstam	Sweden	274 (−14)	600,000	90,000
1996	Oct 10–13	Annika Sörenstam	Sweden	270 (−18)	600,000	90,000

^{1}54-hole tournament

== Tournament record ==
Year	Player	Score	Round
2000	Tina Barrett	63 (−9)	1st round
2002	Se Ri Pak	63 (−9)	4th round
