= Stanford International Pro-Am =

Golf tournament formerly on the LPGA Tour

The Stanford International Pro-Am was a golf tournament for professional female golfers that was part of the LPGA Tour for one year only, in 2008. It was played at the Fairmont Turnberry Isle Resort & Club in Aventura, Florida.

The tournament was in the format of a pro-am, with 112 LPGA professionals and 112 amateurs. It was the first pro-am on the LPGA Tour since the 2001 Office Depot Pro-Am at the Doral Golf Resort & Spa. After 36 holes the field was cut to the top 70 professionals and top 20 teams, and after 54 holes only the professionals competed for the $2,000,000 purse. Play was on both the Soffer and Miller courses at the Fairmont Turnberry Isle Resort & Club.

In November 2008, the LPGA and Stanford Financial announced that this event would not be held in 2009 and that Stanford would take over sponsorship of the year-end Tour Championship, moving the event from West Palm Beach, Florida to Houston, Texas.

== Winners ==
Year	Dates	Champion	Country	Score	Purse	Winner's Share
2008*	Apr 24-27	Annika Sörenstam	Sweden	275 (-8)	$2,000,000	$300,000

*Tournament won in sudden-death playoff.

== Tournament record ==
Year	Player	Score	Round	Course
2008	Karrie Webb	64 (-7)	4th round	Fairmont Turnberry Isle Resort & Club - Soffer Course
