= Rachel Hetherington =

Australian professional golfer (born 1972)

Personal information
- Nationality: Australia
- Born: 23 April 1972 (age 54) Port Macquarie, Australia
- Height: 5 ft 5 in (1.65 m)

Career
- Sport: Golf
- Turned professional: 1994
- Former tours: LPGA Tour (joined 1997); ALPG Tour (joined 1994); Ladies European Tour (1994–96)
- Professional wins: 11

Number of wins by tour
- LPGA Tour: 8
- Ladies European Tour: 3
- Other: 1

Best results in LPGA major championships
- Chevron Championship: T2: 2001
- Women's PGA C'ship: T3: 2003
- U.S. Women's Open: T8: 2006
- du Maurier Classic: T16: 1997, 2000
- Women's British Open: 2nd: 2004

Rachel Hetherington (born 23 April 1972) is an Australian professional golfer who played on the American LPGA Tour. Hetherington played under her married name, Rachel Teske, from 2001 to 2004.

== Career overview ==
Hetherington was born in Port Macquarie, Australia. One of the greatest golfers to come out of Australia, she had a very impressive career as an amateur. She was the New South Wales Junior Champion from 1989 to 1992. In 1992, she won the New South Wales Women's Amateur Championship and the Tasmanian Amateur Open.

Hetherington joined the LPGA Tour in 1997, making the cut in 25 of the 28 tournaments she played that year. Her greatest year to date was 2003, when she won twice (earning back-to-back titles for the second time in her career), finished in the top ten 11 times and earned over $900,000 in prize money. She won eight tournaments on the LPGA Tour, the last coming in 2003.

Hetherington married former Australian Test cricketer Greg Ritchie in January 2009. Both Hetherington and Ritchie live in Florida, United States. She is active in promoting awareness for breast cancer research.

== Professional wins (11) ==
=== LPGA Tour wins (8) ===
No.	Date	Tournament	Winning score	Margin of victory	Runner(s)-up
1	27 Sep 1998	First Union Betsy King Classic	−14 (69-66-70-69=274)	Playoff	(Sweden) Annika Sörenstam
2	25 Apr 1999	Chick-fil-A Charity Championship	−12 (67-67-70=204)	Playoff	(Canada) Lorie Kane
3	2 May 1999	City of Hope Myrtle Beach Classic	−7 (69-68=137)	1 stroke	(Sweden) Helen Alfredsson (United States) Leta Lindley (Australia) Karrie Webb
4	16 Jun 2001	Evian Masters^{1}	−15 (71-68-66-68=273)	1 stroke	(Sweden) Maria Hjorth
5	17 Mar 2002	PING Banner Health	−7 (70-69-71-71=281)	Playoff	(Sweden) Annika Sörenstam
6	14 Jul 2002	Jamie Farr Kroger Classic	−14 (67-73-64-66=270)	2 strokes	(United States) Beth Bauer
7	15 Jun 2003	Giant Eagle LPGA Classic	−12 (70-65-69=204)	Playoff	(Canada) Lorie Kane (Philippines) Jennifer Rosales (Sweden) Annika Sörenstam
8	22 Jun 2003	Wegmans Rochester LPGA	−11 (69-68-72-68=277)	4 strokes	(Mexico) Lorena Ochoa

LPGA Tour playoff record (4–1)

No.	Year	Tournament	Opponent(s)	Result
1	1998	First Union Betsy King Classic	(Sweden) Annika Sörenstam	Won with birdie on first extra hole
2	1999	Chick-fil-A Charity Championship	(Canada) Lori Kane	Won with birdie on first extra hole
3	2000	Jamie Farr Kroger Classic	(Sweden) Annika Sörenstam	Lost to birdie on second extra hole
4	2002	PING Banner Health	(Sweden) Annika Sörenstam	Won with birdie on second extra hole
5	2003	Giant Eagle LPGA Classic	(Canada) Lorie Kane (Philippines) Jennifer Rosales (Sweden) Annika Sörenstam	Won with birdie on third extra hole

=== Ladies European Tour wins (3) ===
- 1995 Maredo German Open, La Manga Spanish Open
- 2001 Evian Masters^{1}

=== Other wins (1) ===
- 2000 Women's World Cup of Golf (with Karrie Webb)

^{1} Co-sanctioned by LPGA Tour and Ladies European Tour

== Results in LPGA majors ==
Tournament	1997	1998	1999	2000
Kraft Nabisco Championship		T59	T21	T62
LPGA Championship	T60	T30	T42	CUT
U.S. Women's Open	CUT		T53	CUT
du Maurier Classic	T16			T16

Tournament	2001	2002	2003	2004	2005	2006	2007	2008	2009	2010
Kraft Nabisco Championship	T2	T65	T48	T35	T39	T42	CUT	T31	T56	
LPGA Championship	T17	T15	T3	T49	T42	T34	T59	T46	CUT	CUT
U.S. Women's Open	CUT	T12	T13	T10	T31	T8	CUT	T42	CUT	
Women's British Open ^	CUT	T18	T46	2	T42	69	T55	T69		

^ The Women's British Open replaced the du Maurier Classic as an LPGA major in 2001.

Top 10
Did not play

CUT = missed the half-way cut
"T" = tied

=== Summary ===
Tournament	Wins	2nd	3rd	Top-5	Top-10	Top-25	Events	Cuts made
Kraft Nabisco Championship	0	1	0	1	1	2	12	11
LPGA Championship	0	0	1	1	1	3	14	11
U.S. Women's Open	0	0	0	0	2	4	12	7
du Maurier Classic	0	0	0	0	0	2	2	2
Women's British Open	0	1	0	1	1	2	8	7
Totals	0	2	1	3	5	13	48	38

- Most consecutive cuts made – 20 (2002 Nabisco – 2006 British)
- Longest streak of top-10s – 2 (2004 U.S. Open – 2004 British)

== Team appearances ==
Amateur

- Tasman Cup (representing Australia): 1991, 1993 (winners)

Professional

- World Cup (representing Australia): 2005, 2006
- The Queens (representing Australia): 2015 (captain), 2016 (captain), 2017
