= Michelob Light Classic =

Golf tournament formerly on the LPGA Tour

The Michelob Light Classic was a golf tournament on the LPGA Tour from 1994 to 2001. It was played at two different courses in the St. Louis, Missouri area. From 1994 to 1999, it was played at the Forest Hills Country Club in Chesterfield. In 2000 and 2001, it was played at the Fox Run Golf Club in Eureka. Annika Sörenstam won four of the eight editions of the tournament.

== Winners ==
Michelob Light Classic

- 2001 Emilee Klein
- 2000 Lorie Kane
- 1999 Annika Sörenstam
- 1998 Annika Sörenstam
- 1997 Annika Sörenstam

Michelob Light Heartland Classic

- 1996 Vicki Fergon

GHP Heartland Classic

- 1995 Annika Sörenstam
- 1994 Liselotte Neumann
