= Laura Diaz =

American professional golfer (born 1975)

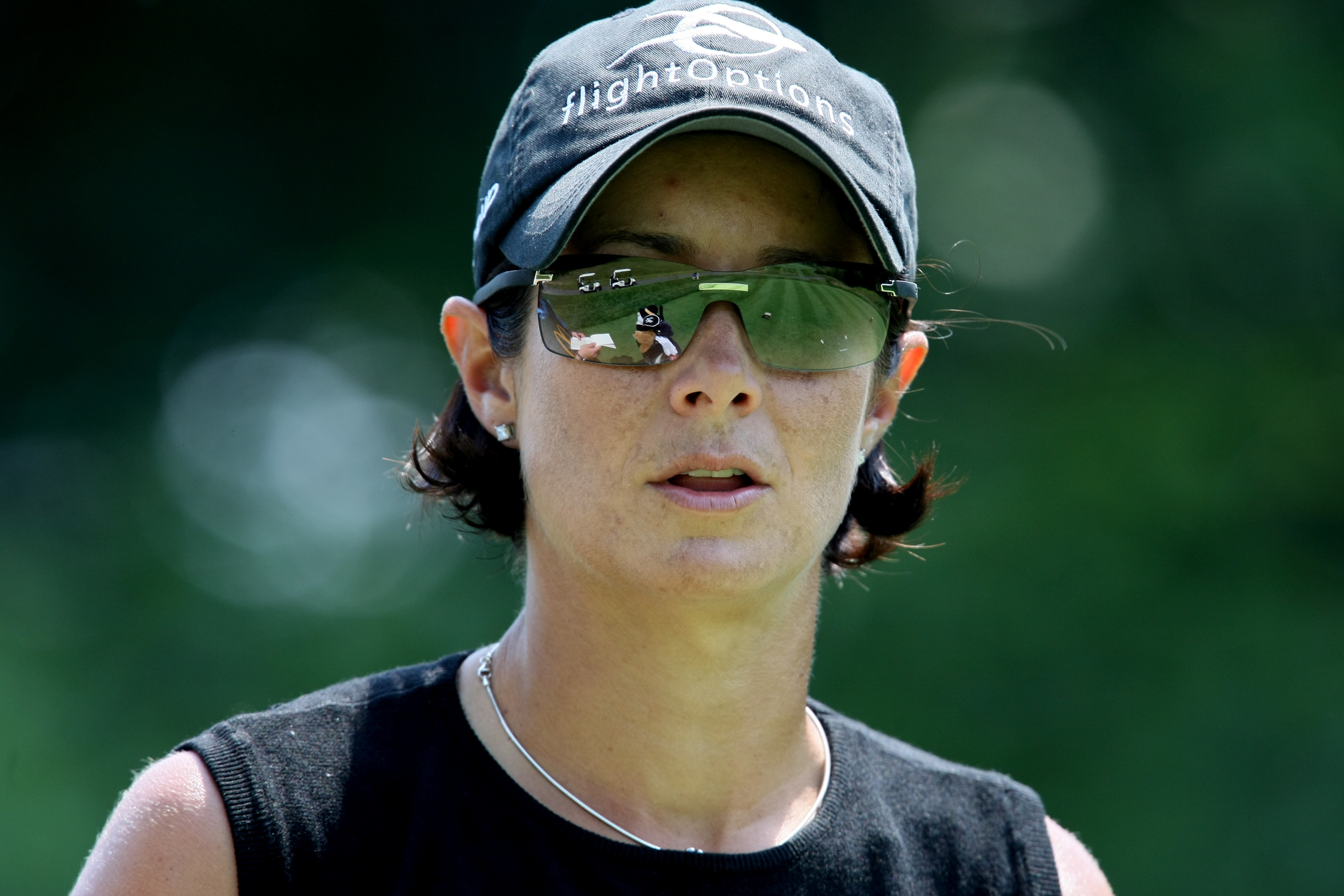
- Diaz at 2009 LPGA Championship

Personal information
- Full name: Laura Philo Diaz
- Nationality: United States
- Born: April 27, 1975 (age 51) Scotia, New York, U.S.
- Height: 5 ft 8 in (1.73 m)
- Spouse: Kevin Diaz (m. 2000)
- Children: 2

Career
- Sport: Golf
- College: Wake Forest University
- Turned professional: 1997
- Former tours: LPGA Tour (joined 1999); Ladies European Tour (joined 1998); Futures Tour
- Professional wins: 6

Number of wins by tour
- LPGA Tour: 2
- Epson Tour: 3
- Other: 1

Best results in LPGA major championships
- Chevron Championship: T3: 2005
- Women's PGA C'ship: 2nd: 2001
- U.S. Women's Open: T7: 2002
- du Maurier Classic: T7: 2000
- Women's British Open: T3: 2001
- Evian Championship: T54: 2014

Achievements and awards
- Ladies European Tour Rookie of the Year: 1998

Laura Diaz (born April 27, 1975) is an American professional golfer.

== Early life and amateur career ==
Diaz was born Laura Philo in Scotia, New York. Laura's brother is Ron Philo Jr. He eventually became a professional golfer. He is currently a PGA Professional who made the cut at the 2005 PGA Championship.

Philo attended Wake Forest University. She majored in business. Philo won the 1995 North and South Women's Amateur at Pinehurst. In 1996, she won the Eastern Women's Amateur Championship and made it to the quarterfinals of the U.S. Women's Amateur. In 1997, Philo was named Wake Forest's Female Athlete of the Year.

== Professional career ==
In 1997, Philo turned professional. She spent three years playing on the Futures Tour where she scored three tournament wins. She also played on the Ladies European Tour, where she was rookie of the year in 1998.

In 1999, she joined the LPGA Tour and earned two victories, both coming in the 2002 season when she had ten top-10 finishes. She has played on four Solheim Cup teams: in 2002, 2003, 2005, and 2007.

== Personal life ==
Prior to 2000, she competed as Laura Philo before marrying her husband, Kevin Diaz, and taking his last name. They have two children.

== Awards and honors ==
- In 1997, while a senior at Wake Forest University, she was named Female Athlete of the Year.
- In 1998, she earned Rookie of the Year honors on the Ladies European Tour.

== Amateur wins ==
- 1995 North and South Women's Amateur
- 1996 Eastern Women's Amateur

== Professional wins (6) ==
=== LPGA Tour wins (2) ===
No.	Date	Tournament	Winning score	To par	Margin of victory	Runner-up	Winner's share ($)
1	Mar 24, 2002	Welch's/Circle K Championship	67-67-68-68=270	−18	1 stroke	(United States) Juli Inkster	120,000
2	May 26, 2002	LPGA Corning Classic	66-69-69-70=274	−14	2 strokes	(United States) Rosie Jones	150,000

=== Futures Tour wins (3) ===
- 1997 Weston Hills Futures Classic
- 1998 SunTrust Futures Classic, Eaglebrooke Futures Championship

=== Legends Tour wins (1) ===
- 2021 BJ's Charity Championship (with Jan Stephenson)

== Results in LPGA majors ==
Results not in chronological order.

Tournament	1999	2000
ANA Inspiration		
Women's PGA Championship	CUT	T40
U.S. Women's Open		
du Maurier Classic	T53	T7

Tournament	2001	2002	2003	2004	2005	2006	2007	2008	2009	2010	2011	2012
ANA Inspiration	T9	T30	T5	CUT	T3	CUT	T30	CUT	T60	CUT	T47	
Women's PGA Championship	2	T20	T30	CUT	T20	T25	T81	5	CUT	CUT	CUT	CUT
U.S. Women's Open	CUT	T7	T13	T44	T23	CUT	T39	T27	CUT	CUT	CUT	
Women's British Open ^	T3	CUT	T14	T13	T64	65	CUT	T34	T67			

Tournament	2013	2014	2015	2016	2017
ANA Inspiration		CUT	CUT		
Women's PGA Championship	T53	T25	CUT		
U.S. Women's Open	T50	T49	CUT		
Women's British Open	CUT				T63
The Evian Championship ^^	CUT	T54			

^ The Women's British Open replaced the du Maurier Classic as an LPGA major in 2001.
^^ The Evian Championship was added as a major in 2013.

Top 10
Did not play

CUT = missed the half-way cut
"T" = tied

=== Summary ===
Tournament	Wins	2nd	3rd	Top-5	Top-10	Top-25	Events	Cuts made
ANA Inspiration	0	0	1	2	3	3	13	7
U.S. Women's Open	0	0	0	0	1	3	14	8
Women's PGA Championship	0	1	0	2	2	6	17	10
du Maurier Classic	0	0	0	0	1	1	2	2
Women's British Open	0	0	1	1	1	3	11	8
The Evian Championship	0	0	0	0	0	0	2	1
Totals	0	1	2	5	8	16	59	36

- Most consecutive cuts made – 6 (2004 U.S. Women's Open – 2005 Women's British Open)
- Longest streak of top-10s – 2 (2001 Kraft Nabisco Championship – 2001 LPGA Championship)

== Team appearances ==
Professional

- Solheim Cup (representing the United States): 2002 (winners), 2003, 2005 (winners), 2007 (winners)
