= 2002 Kraft Nabisco Championship =

Coordinates: 33.798°N 116.433°W

Tournament information
- Dates: March 28–31, 2002
- Location: Rancho Mirage, California
- Courses: Mission Hills Country Club; Dinah Shore Tourn. Course
- Tour: LPGA Tour
- Format: Stroke play - 72 holes

Statistics
- Par: 72
- Length: 6,520 yards (5,962 m)
- Field: 92 players, 74 after cut
- Cut: 153 (+9)
- Prize fund: $1.5 million
- Winner's share: $225,000

Champion
- (Sweden) Annika Sörenstam
- 280 (−8)

Location in the United States
Location in California

The 2002 Kraft Nabisco Championship was a women's professional golf tournament, held March 28–31 at Mission Hills Country Club in Rancho Mirage, California. This was the 31st edition of the Kraft Nabisco Championship, and the twentieth as a major championship.

Defending champion Annika Sörenstam shot a final round 68 to win the second of her three titles at this event, one stroke ahead of runner-up and compatriot Liselotte Neumann; it was the fourth of Sörenstam's ten major titles. The co-leaders after 54 holes were Sörenstam, Neumann, and Karrie Webb, the 2000 champion.

Through 2017, this is the sole successful title defense at this major championship. Before it became a major in 1983, Sandra Post won consecutively in 1978 and 1979.

== Final leaderboard ==
Sunday, March 31, 2002

Place	Player	Score	To par	Money ($)
1	(Sweden) Annika Sörenstam	70-71-71-68=280	−8	225,000
2	(Sweden) Liselotte Neumann	69-70-73-69=281	−7	136,987
T3	(United States) Rosie Jones	72-69-72-69=282	−6	88,125
T3	(United States) Cristie Kerr	74-70-70-68=282	−6	88,125
T5	(Japan) Akiko Fukushima	73-76-68-66=283	−5	56,250
T5	(Sweden) Carin Koch	73-73-71-66=283	−5	56,250
7	(Australia) Karrie Webb	75-70-67-72=284	−4	42,375
8	(Mexico) Lorena Ochoa (a)	75-69-71-70=285	−3	0
T9	(United States) Becky Iverson	71-74-68-73=286	−2	31,050
T9	(Canada) Lorie Kane	73-72-70-71=286	−2	31,050
T9	(United States) Leta Lindley	72-72-72-70=286	−2	31,050
T9	(South Korea) Se Ri Pak	74-71-71-70=286	−2	31,050
T9	(South Korea) Grace Park	75-73-70-68=286	−2	31,050

Amateurs: Lorena Ochoa (−3), Aree Song (+11), Naree Song (+11), Meredith Duncan (+19).
