= Office Depot Championship =

Golf tournament

The Office Depot Championship was an annual golf tournament for professional female golfers on the LPGA Tour. It took place every year from 1997 through 2005 at various sites in South Carolina (1997–2000) and in the Los Angeles, California area (2001–2005).

The tournament had several named sponsors during its history. From 2001 through 2005, it was sponsored by Office Depot, a supplier of office products and services.

Tournament names through the years:

- 1997: Susan G. Komen International
- 1998–1999: City of Hope Myrtle Beach Classic
- 2000: Kathy Ireland Greens.com LPGA Classic
- 2001: The Office Depot Hosted by Amy Alcott
- 2002–2004: The Office Depot Championship Hosted by Amy Alcott
- 2005: Office Depot Championship

The last tournament was held from September 30 through October 2, 2005.

== Winners ==
Year	Champion	Country	Score	Venue	Purse ($)	Winner's share ($)
2005	Hee-Won Han	South Korea	201 (−12)	Trump National Golf Club Los Angeles	1,300,000	195,000
2004	Annika Sörenstam	Sweden	207 (−9)	El Caballero Country Club	1,750,000	262,500
2003	Annika Sörenstam	Sweden	211 (−5)	El Caballero Country Club	1,500,000	225,000
2002	Se Ri Pak	South Korea	209 (−7)	El Caballero Country Club	1,000,000	150,000
2001	Annika Sörenstam	Sweden	210 (−6)	Wilshire Country Club	800,000	120,000
2000	Grace Park	South Korea	274 (−14)	Doral Golf Resort	750,000	112,500
1999	Rachel Hetherington	Australia	137 (−7)*	Wachesaw Plantation East Golf Club	675,000	101,250
1998	Karrie Webb	Australia	269 (−19)	Wachesaw Plantation East Golf Club	600,000	90,000
1997	Karrie Webb	Australia	276 (−12)	Wachesaw Plantation East Golf Club	500,000	75,000

*The 1999 tournament was shortened to 36 holes because of rain.

== Tournament record ==
Year	Player	Score	Round	Course
1998	Meg Mallon	62 (−10)	1st round	Wachesaw Plantation East Club

== See also ==
- The Office Depot, another LPGA event
