= Janice Moodie =

Scottish professional golfer (born 1973)

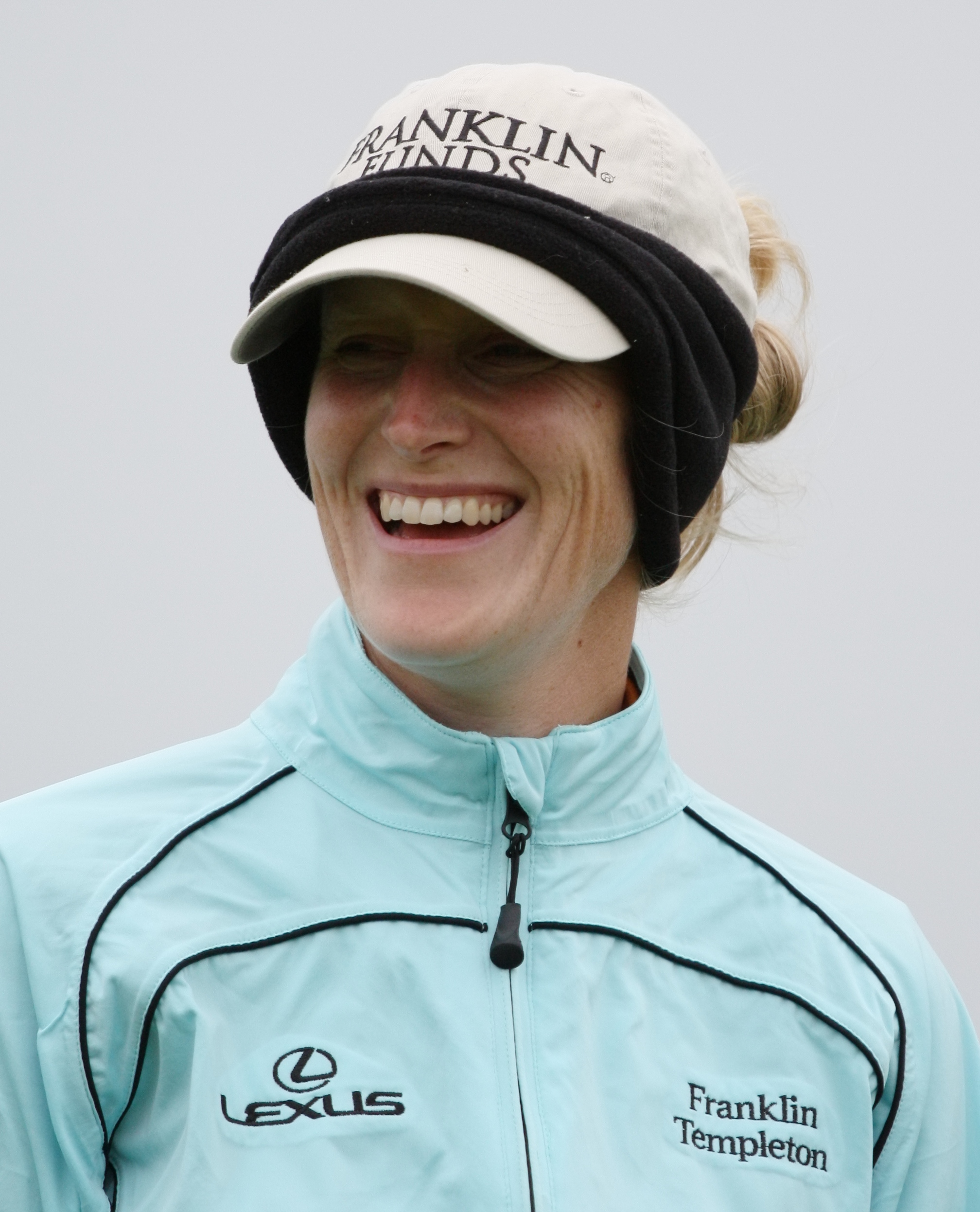
- Moodie at the 2009 Women's British Open

Personal information
- Full name: Janice C. Moodie
- Nationality: Scotland
- Born: 31 May 1973 (age 53) Glasgow, Scotland
- Height: 5 ft 8 in (1.73 m)

Career
- Sport: Golf
- College: San Jose State University
- Turned professional: 1997
- Former tours: LPGA Tour (joined 1998); Ladies European Tour (joined 1997)
- Professional wins: 4

Number of wins by tour
- LPGA Tour: 2

Best results in LPGA major championships
- Chevron Championship: T2: 2001
- Women's PGA C'ship: T21: 1998
- U.S. Women's Open: T7: 2002
- du Maurier Classic: T23: 1999
- Women's British Open: T3: 2001
- Evian Championship: DNP

Janice C. Moodie (born 31 May 1973) is a Scottish professional golfer who played mainly on the U.S.-based LPGA Tour but was also a member of the Ladies European Tour.

== Amateur career ==
Moodie was born in Glasgow. At age 11, she was taught to play golf by her mother, a former 6-handicap amateur, at Windyhill Golf Club in Bearsden, Scotland. At age 16, she left school and started working in a grocery store and Greaves sporting-goods shop in Glasgow. She had to postpone her college enrollment when her mother suffered a brain aneurysm that left her with tunnel-vision blindness and for the next three and a half years Moodie worked in the winter (including a few weeks in a nightclub) so she could play competitive amateur golf in the summer. During this period she won the 1992 Scottish Women's Strokeplay Championship and represented Great Britain and Ireland in the Curtis Cup in 1994 when her win over Carol Semple Thompson in the final singles match secured a 9- 9 tie keeping the Curtis Cup in GB&I by virtue of the GB&I win in 1992. She also played on the victorious 1996 team in Killarney, Ireland and played in the 1996 Espirito Santo Trophy World Amateur Team Championship where she finished 2nd.

Moodie enrolled at San Jose State University to play collegiate golf for the Spartans, graduating in 1997 with a degree in psychology. She won 12 collegiate tournaments including the 1995 GolfWorld/Palmetto Dunes, the 1996 Stanford Women's Intercollegiate and the 1997 Peg Barnard California Collegiate. She was Big West Champion 1994-1996, Big West Athlete of the Year 1994-1996, was All-Big West 1994 and 1995 and finished in the top ten at the NCAA Championships each year 1994-1997 thus earning First-Team All-American honours each year during 1994-1997. She posted the lowest scoring average on her team from 1996–97 and won the Golfstat Cup in 1996. She turned professional in 1997 and qualified for the LPGA Tour by tying for 21st at the LPGA Final Qualifying Tournament to earn non-exempt status for the 1998 season.

== Professional career ==
In 1998 Moodie had three top ten finishes. Her best result was fourth place which she achieved once in Europe at the Weetabix Women's British Open and once in the United States at the City of Hope Myrtle Beach Classic. She finished second to Se Ri Pak in the Rolex Rookie of the Year race. In 2000, she claimed her maiden victory at the ShopRite LPGA Classic, becoming only the second Scot to win on the LPGA Tour, moved past the $1 million mark in LPGA career earnings and made her Solheim Cup debut at Loch Lomond Golf Club in her native Scotland.

In 2002, Moodie won her second LPGA title at the Asahi Ryokuken International Championship and was somewhat controversially not one of Dale Reid's captain picks for the Solheim Cup having chosen to play in the U.S. rather than on the LET in the run up to selection. Captain Catrin Nilsmark did pick Moodie for the 2003 Solheim Cup and she rewarded her captain by winning three and a half points and paved the way during the singles matches when she defeated Kelli Keuhne by 3&2 in the top match. 2003 also saw Moodie inducted into the San Jose State University Sports Hall of Fame. At the start of 2004, Moodie was inducted into the National Golf Coaches Association (NGCA) Hall of Fame

In 2005 Moodie together with Catriona Matthew represented Scotland in the inaugural Women's World Cup of Golf in South Africa and was part of the International Team at the first staging of the Lexus Cup. Moodie and Matthew continued their partnership at the 2006 Women's World Cup of Golf and made it three appearances in a row when she paired with Mhairi McKay in the 2007 staging.

== Off-course activities ==
Moodie supports her own tournament for the Janice Moodie trophy at her home club of Windyhill. The event is for girls aged ten to 21 with a handicap limit of 40. She also makes a contribution to the West of Scotland Girls' Associations towards the girls' travelling costs

== Professional wins (4) ==
=== LPGA Tour wins (2) ===
No.	Date	Tournament	Winning score	Margin of victory	Runner(s)-up
1	2 Jul 2000	ShopRite LPGA Classic	–10 (66-68-69=203)	2 strokes	(United States) Pat Hurst (South Korea) Grace Park
2	19 May 2002	Asahi Ryokuken International Championship	–15 (70-66-67-70=273)	7 strokes	(England) Laura Davies

=== Other wins ===
- 2001 Hyundai Team Matches (with Lorie Kane)
- 2002 Hyundai Team Matches (with Lorie Kane)

== LPGA Tour career summary ==
Year	Wins	Earnings ($)	Money list rank	Average
1998	0	205,126	36	71.51
1999	0	447,903	17	71.19
2000	1	534,833	14	71.94
2001	0	595,463	16	71.24
2002	1	424,238	22	71.70
2003	0	222,147	46	72.11
2004	0	208,939	56	71.95
2005	0	197,273	57	72.54
2006	0	92,703	91	72.37
2007	0	197,098	58	72.97
2008	0	213,074	64	72.88
2009	0	208,396	58	72.09
2010	0	95,199	73	73.78
2011	0	14,316	129	74.36
2012	0	19,809	128	74.00

== Team appearances ==
Amateur

- European Ladies' Team Championship (representing Scotland): 1991, 1993, 1995, 1997
- Vagliano Trophy (representing Great Britain & Ireland): 1993 (winners), 1995, 1997
- Curtis Cup (representing Great Britain & Ireland): 1994 (tie, Cup retained), 1996 (winners)
- Espirito Santo Trophy (representing Great Britain & Ireland): 1996
- Commonwealth Trophy (representing Great Britain): 1995

Professional

- Solheim Cup (representing Europe): 2000 (winners), 2003 (winners), 2009
- Lexus Cup (representing International team): 2005 (winners)
- World Cup (representing Scotland): 2005, 2006, 2007

=== Solheim Cup record ===
Year	Total matches	Total W-L-H	Singles W-L-H	Foursomes W-L-H	Fourballs W-L-H	Points won	Points %
Career	11	7-2-2	2-0-1	4-1-1	1-1-0	8	72.7%
2000	4	3-1-0	1-0-0 def N. Scranton 1up	2-0-0 won w/A. Sörenstam 1up, won w/A. Sörenstam 1up	0-1-0 lost w/A. Sörenstam 2&1	3	75%
2003	4	3-0-1	1-0-0 def K. Kuehne 3&2	1-0-1 won w/S. Pettersen 4&3, halved w/C. Matthew	1-0-0 won w/C. Matthew 4&3	3.5	87.5%
2009	3	1-1-1	0-0-1 halved w/N. Gulbis	1-1-0 lost w/C. Matthew 2&1, won w/S. Gustafson	0-0-0	1.5	50%
