= Asahi Ryokuken International Championship =

Golf tournament formerly on the LPGA Tour

The Asahi Ryokuken International Championship was a golf tournament for professional female golfers that was part of the LPGA Tour from 2001 through 2004. It was played at the Mount Vintage Plantation Golf Club in North Augusta, South Carolina.

The first major professional golf tournament owned by African Americans Larry and John Fridie. The brothers partnered with Japanese-American Cappy Harada. They selected Mount Vintage Golf course in North Augusta, South Carolina as the official home of the tournament. In partnership with Bettis Rainsford the owner of Mt. Vintage they partnered and conducted the first tournament just days after 9/11 2001. Cappy Harada introduced Asahi Ryokuken of Japan as the official sponsor of the 1.2 million dollar prize for the winner. The tournament was broadcast on ESPN. The last tournament was held in October 2004. Tina Fischer of Germany was the first winner

== Winners ==
Year	Champion	Country	Score	Purse	Winner's Share
2004	Liselotte Neumann	Sweden	273 (-15)	$1,000,000	$150,000
2003	Rosie Jones	United States	273 (-15)	$1,300,000	$195,000
2002	Janice Moodie	Scotland	273 (-15)	$1,250,000	$187,500
2001	Tina Fischer	Germany	206 (-10)	$1,200,000	$180,000

The 2001 tournament was shortened to 54 holes due to rain.

== Tournament record ==
Year	Player	Score	Round
2001	Kim Williams	65 (-7)	3rd round
