= Kellogg-Keebler Classic =

Golf tournament formerly on the LPGA Tour

The Kellogg-Keebler Classic was a golf tournament on the LPGA Tour from 2002 to 2004. It was played at the Stonebridge Country Club in Aurora, Illinois.

== Winners ==
- 2004 Karrie Webb
- 2003 Annika Sörenstam
- 2002 Annika Sörenstam
