= Giant Eagle LPGA Classic =

Golf tournament formerly on the LPGA Tour

The Giant Eagle LPGA Classic was an official golf tournament on the LPGA Tour held in the Youngstown, Ohio area.

From its beginnings in 1990 until 1992, it was known as The Phar-Mor in Youngstown and was held at Squaw Creek Country Club in Vienna Township, Ohio. It became the Youngstown-Warren LPGA Classic in 1993 and was held at Avalon Lakes Golf Club in Warren, Ohio until 2000. In 1997, Pittsburgh-based grocery store chain Giant Eagle took over the title sponsorship of the tournament. The tournament returned to Squaw Creek in 2001. The last tournament was held in 2004.

== Winners ==
Giant Eagle LPGA Classic

- 2004 Moira Dunn
- 2003 Rachel Teske
- 2002 Mi Hyun Kim
- 2001 Dorothy Delasin
- 2000 Dorothy Delasin
- 1999 Jackie Gallagher-Smith
- 1998 Se Ri Pak
- 1997 Tammie Green

Youngstown-Warren LPGA Classic

- 1996 Michelle McGann
- 1995 Michelle McGann
- 1994 Tammie Green
- 1993 Nancy Lopez

The Phar-Mor in Youngstown

- 1992 Betsy King
- 1991 Deb Richard
- 1990 Beth Daniel
