= 2006 LPGA Championship =

Tournament information
- Dates: June 8–11, 2006
- Location: Havre de Grace, Maryland; 39.542°N 76.133°W
- Course: Bulle Rock Golf Course
- Tour: LPGA Tour
- Format: Stroke play - 72 holes

Statistics
- Par: 72
- Length: 6,596 yards (6,031 m)
- Field: 150 players, 73 after cut
- Cut: 146 (+2)
- Prize fund: $1.8 million
- Winner's share: $270,000

Champion
- (South Korea) Se Ri Pak
- 280 (−8), playoff
- Location in United States Location in Maryland

The 2006 LPGA Championship was the 52nd LPGA Championship, played June 8–11 at Bulle Rock Golf Course in Havre de Grace, Maryland. This was the second of four major championships on the LPGA Tour in 2006.

Se Ri Pak, age 28, won her third LPGA Championship with a playoff victory over Karrie Webb. She three-putted the 72nd hole to fall into a tie with Webb at 280 (−8), one stroke ahead of Ai Miyazato and Mi Hyun Kim. Webb had birdie opportunities on the final two holes, but parred both.

After a short tee shot on the first extra hole, Pak hit her long approach shot within inches for birdie to gain her fifth major title and 23rd win on the LPGA Tour, the first in two years.

This championship was played at Bulle Rock for five consecutive seasons, 2005 through 2009.

== Final leaderboard ==
Sunday, June 11, 2006

Place	Player	Score	To par	Money ($)
T1	(South Korea) Se Ri Pak	71-69-71-69=280	−8	Playoff
T1	(Australia) Karrie Webb	70-70-72-68=280	−8	Playoff
T3	(South Korea) Mi Hyun Kim	68-71-71-71=281	−7	105,501
T3	(Japan) Ai Miyazato	68-72-69-72=281	−7	105,501
T5	(South Korea) Shi Hyun Ahn	69-70-71-72=282	−6	57,464
T5	(United States) Pat Hurst	66-71-72-73=282	−6	57,464
T5	(United States) Cristie Kerr	66-74-74-68=282	−6	57,464
T5	(United States) Michelle Wie	71-68-71-72=282	−6	57,464
T9	(South Korea) Young Kim	69-72-73-69=283	−5	34,174
T9	(Mexico) Lorena Ochoa	68-72-71-72=283	−5	34,174
T9	(United States) Reilley Rankin	68-73-74-68=283	−5	34,174
T9	(Sweden) Annika Sörenstam	71-69-75-68=283	−5	34,174
T9	(South Korea) Sung Ah Yim	72-68-74-69=283	−5	34,174

=== Playoff ===
On the first extra hole, Pak's tee shot popped up and was well behind Webb's, but her 201-yard (184 m) approach shot stopped within inches of the cup; she tapped in for birdie and the title.

Place	Player	Score	To par	Money ($)
1	(South Korea) Se Ri Pak	3	−1	270,000
2	(Australia) Karrie Webb	4	E	163,998
