= 1998 U.S. Women's Open =

Coordinates: 43.726°N 87.774°W

Tournament information
- Dates: July 2–6, 1998
- Location: Kohler, Wisconsin
- Courses: Blackwolf Run (original course)
- Organized by: USGA
- Tour: LPGA Tour

Statistics
- Par: 71
- Length: 6,412 yards (5,863 m)
- Field: 150 players, 62 after cut
- Cut: 150 (+8)
- Prize fund: $1.5 million
- Winner's share: $267,500

Champion
- (South Korea) Se Ri Pak
- 290 (+6), playoff

Location in the United States
Location in Wisconsin

The 1998 U.S. Women's Open was the 53rd edition of the U.S. Women's Open, held July 2–6 at Blackwolf Run in Kohler, Wisconsin.

The champion was Se Ri Pak, the winner of a 20-hole Monday playoff over amateur Jenny Chuasiriporn. Both age 20, Pak and Chuasiriporn finished the 18-hole playoff round tied at 73, and both parred the first extra hole, a par-5. Pak rolled in an 18-foot (5.5 m) birdie putt on the 92nd hole of competition to become the youngest woman to win two major championships in the same year. She won her first major, the LPGA Championship, seven weeks earlier.

On the 72nd hole on Sunday, Chuasiriporn holed a 40-foot (12 m) birdie putt to get into the playoff. Pak later had an 8-foot (2.4 m) birdie putt to win the title outright, but it did not drop. Pak was awarded the winner's share of the prize money on Sunday, prior to the playoff, as Chuasiriporn was an amateur.

The championship returned to the course fourteen years later, in 2012.

== Course layout ==
Hole	1	2	3	4	5	6	7	8	9	Out	10	11	12	13	14	15	16	17	18	In	Total
Yards	340	522	402	335	409	159	415	152	395	3,129	564	374	410	142	310	350	540	172	421	3,283	6,412
Par	4	5	4	4	4	3	4	3	4	35	5	4	4	3	4	4	5	3	4	36	71

- "Original Course" used the back nine from Meadow Valleys for its front nine, and the first four and final five holes from River for its back nine.

== Round summaries ==
=== First round ===
Thursday, July 2, 1998

Place	Player	Score	To par
T1	(England) Laura Davies	68	−3
T1	(United States) Kim Williams	68	−3
T3	(United States) Pat Hurst	69	−2
T3	(South Korea) Se Ri Pak	69	−2
T3	(United States) Leslie Spalding	69	−2
T6	(United States) Donna Andrews	70	−1
T6	(United States) Brenda Corrie-Kuehn (a)	70	−1
T6	(United States) Jackie Gallagher-Smith	70	−1
T6	(United States) Barb Mucha	70	−1
T6	(Sweden) Liselotte Neumann	70	−1

=== Second round ===
Friday, July 3, 1998

Place	Player	Score	To par
1	(South Korea) Se Ri Pak	69-70=139	−3
2	(Sweden) Liselotte Neumann	70-70=140	−2
T3	(United States) Christa Johnson	72-70=142	E
T3	(United States) Brenda Corrie-Kuehn (a)	71-71=142	E
T3	(Scotland) Mhairi McKay	72-70=142	E
T3	(United States) Dottie Pepper	71-71=142	E
T7	(United States) Jenny Chuasiriporn (a)	72-71=143	+1
T7	(England) Laura Davies	68-75=143	+1
T7	(Japan) Akiko Fukushima	72-71=143	+1
T7	(United States) Dale Eggeling	71-72=143	+1
T7	(United States) Leslie Spalding	69-74=143	+1

=== Third round ===
Saturday, July 4, 1998

Place	Player	Score	To par
1	(South Korea) Se Ri Pak	69-70-75=214	+1
T2	(Scotland) Mhairi McKay	72-70-73=215	+2
T2	(Sweden) Liselotte Neumann	70-70-75=215	+2
T4	(United States) Jenny Chuasiriporn (a)	72-71-75=218	+5
T4	(United States) Christa Johnson	72-70-76=218	+5
T6	(United States) Pat Hurst	69-75-75=219	+6
T6	(United States) Barb Mucha	70-74-75=219	+6
T8	(United States) Donna Andrews	74-71-76=220	+7
T8	(United States) Tammie Green	73-71-76=220	+7
T8	(United States) Dottie Pepper	71-71-78=220	+7
T8	(Canada) Lisa Walters	76-70-74=220	+7
T8	(United States) Wendy Ward	76-69-75=220	+7

=== Final round ===
Sunday, July 5, 1998

Place	Player	Score	To par	Money ($)
T1	(South Korea) Se Ri Pak	69-70-75-76=290	+6	Playoff
T1	(United States) Jenny Chuasiriporn (a)	72-71-75-72=290	+6	Playoff
3	(Sweden) Liselotte Neumann	70-70-75-76=291	+7	157,500
T4	(United States) Danielle Ammaccapane	76-71-74-71=292	+8	77,351
T4	(United States) Pat Hurst	69-75-75-73=292	+8	77,351
T4	(United States) Christa Johnson	72-70-76-74=292	+8	77,351
T7	(Italy) Stefania Croce	74-71-76-72=293	+9	46,737
T7	(United States) Tammie Green	73-71-76-73=293	+9	46,737
T7	(Scotland) Mhairi McKay	72-70-73-78=293	+9	46,737
10	(England) Trish Johnson	73-71-77-73=294	+10	39,015

==== Scorecard ====
Hole	1	2	3	4	5	6	7	8	9	10	11	12	13	14	15	16	17	18
Par	4	5	4	4	4	3	4	3	4	5	4	4	3	4	4	5	3	4
(South Korea) Pak	+1	+1	+3	+4	+4	+4	+5	+5	+6	+6	+6	+6	+6	+5	+5	+5	+6	+6
(United States) Chuasiriporn	+5	+5	+5	+5	+6	+6	+6	+5	+5	+5	+5	+5	+5	+5	+6	+6	+7	+6
(Sweden) Neumann	+2	+2	+3	+3	+4	+4	+5	+5	+5	+5	+6	+7	+7	+7	+7	+7	+7	+7
(United States) Ammaccapane	+8	+8	+9	+9	+9	+10	+10	+9	+8	+7	+8	+7	+7	+7	+7	+7	+7	+8
(United States) Hurst	+6	+6	+6	+7	+7	+8	+8	+8	+8	+7	+7	+9	+10	+9	+8	+8	+9	+8
(United States) Johnson	+5	+5	+4	+4	+5	+5	+4	+4	+6	+5	+5	+6	+6	+8	+7	+8	+8	+8

Cumulative tournament scores, relative to par

=== Playoff ===
Monday, July 6, 1998

Place	Player	Score	To par	Money ($)
1	(South Korea) Se Ri Pak	38-35=73	+2	267,500
2	(United States) Jenny Chuasiriporn (a)	36-37=73	+2	0

- Pak and Chuasiriporn tied in the 18-hole playoff at 73 (+2).
- The sudden-death playoff began on the back nine:
  - Both parred the first hole (#10, par 5)
  - Pak (3) birdied the second hole (#11) and Chuasiriporn (x) did not.

==== Scorecard ====
Hole	1	2	3	4	5	6	7	8	9	10	11	12	13	14	15	16	17	18
Par	4	5	4	4	4	3	4	3	4	5	4	4	3	4	4	5	3	4
(South Korea) Pak	E	E	+1	+1	+1	+1	+1	+2	+3	+3	+2	+1	+1	E	+1	+1	+1	+2
(United States) Chuasiriporn	−1	−2	−2	−2	−3	E	E	E	+1	+1	+1	+1	+1	+1	+1	+1	+1	+2
Sudden-death Playoff
(South Korea) Pak										E	−1							
(United States) Chuasiriporn										E	x							
