= Pak Se-ri =

South Korean professional golfer (born 1977)

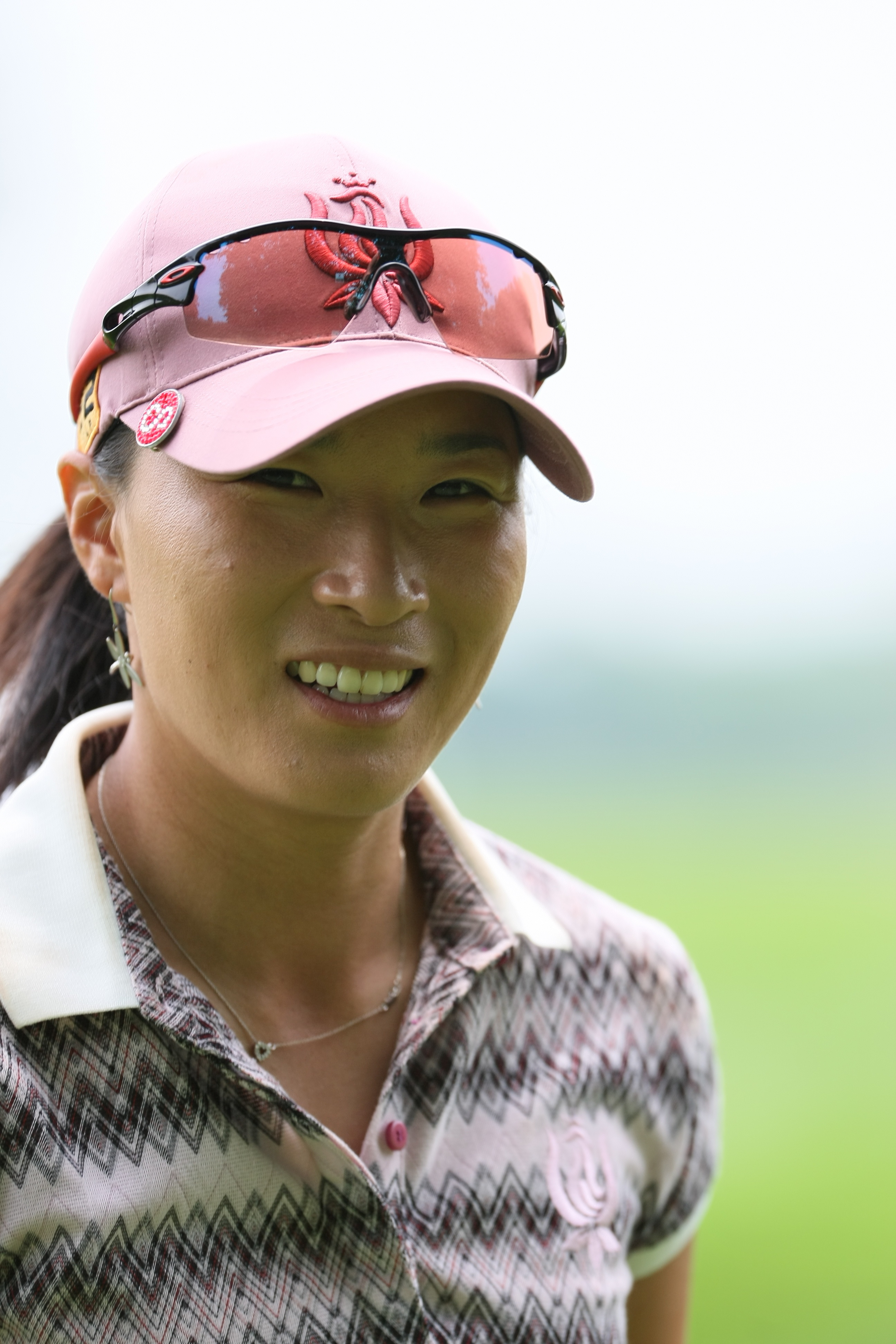
- Pak at the 2009 LPGA Championship

Personal information
- Nationality: South Korea
- Born: 28 September 1977 (age 49) Yusong, Taejon, South Korea
- Height: 5 ft 6 in (1.68 m)

Career
- Sport: Golf
- Turned professional: 1996
- Former tours: LPGA of Korea Tour (joined 1996); LPGA Tour (joined 1998)
- Professional wins: 39

Number of wins by tour
- LPGA Tour: 25
- Ladies European Tour: 1
- LPGA of Korea Tour: 14

Best results in LPGA major championships (wins: 5)
- Chevron Championship: T4: 2014
- Women's PGA C'ship: Won: 1998, 2002, 2006
- U.S. Women's Open: Won: 1998
- du Maurier Classic: T7: 2000
- Women's British Open: Won: 2001
- Evian Championship: T4: 2013

Achievements and awards
- World Golf Hall of Fame: 2007 (member page)
- LPGA Rookie of the Year: 1998
- GWAA Female Player of the Year: 1998
- LPGA Vare Trophy: 2003
- LPGA Heather Farr Award: 2006
- Associated Press Female Athlete of the Year: 1998
- Bob Jones Award: 2020

- Pak Se-ri
- Hangul: 박세리
- RR: Bak Seri
- MR: Pak Seri

Pak Se-ri or Se-ri Pak (Korean: 박세리, Korean pronunciation: [paːk seːɾi]; born 28 September 1977) is a South Korean former professional golfer. She played on the LPGA Tour from 1998 to 2016. She was inducted into the World Golf Hall of Fame in 2007.

== Early life and amateur career ==
In 1977, Pak was born in Daejeon, South Korea. She attended Yusong Elementary School in that city.

Later, Pak attended Keumseong Girls’ High School in Kongju City, Chungnam Province where she was the school's best amateur golfer. She then moved to Seoul for training.

== Professional career ==
In 1996, Pak turned professional. The following year before she moved to the U.S. as a 20-year-old. In 1996 and 1997, she won six tournaments on the LPGA of Korea Tour. Pak joined the LPGA Tour full-time for the year 1998, crowning her rookie season with victories in two majors: the McDonald's LPGA Championship and U.S. Women's Open. At just 20 years of age, she became the youngest-ever winner of the U.S. Women's Open. About.com writes that "Pak won a 20-hole playoff for that victory, making that tournament - at 92 holes in length - the longest tournament ever in women's professional golf." Four days after the U.S. Women's Open win, Pak shot a then-LPGA record 61 during the second round of the Jamie Farr Kroger Classic. She won the Rolex Rookie of the Year award for that season.

Since 1998, she has gone on to win 21 more events on the Tour, including three more majors. In June 2007, at age 29, she qualified for the World Golf Hall of Fame, surpassing Karrie Webb as the youngest living entrant ever. (Tom Morris, Jr., who died in 1875 at the age of 24, had been elected in 1975.)

Pak has also competed in a professional men's event, at the 2003 SBS Super Tournament on the Korean Tour. The Korean Tour was a feeder tour for the Asian Tour and did not offer world ranking points. She finished 10th in the event, according to the World Golf Hall of Fame "becoming the first woman to make the cut in a professional men's tournament since Babe Zaharias did so in 1945."

At the 2005 McDonald's LPGA Championship, she missed the cut for the first time in 29 majors. In an interview quoted on the PGA Tour's website, she commented that she was searching for a balance between her golf and her personal life: "I've been a little bit unhappy about everything, my game, big game. I'm not really enjoying it at all, and I'm not doing anything with my ability. I know what I needed, a much better balance. I'm always putting a lot of pressure on myself." Eventually, she was found to have a finger injury. In 2006, she rediscovered her best form by winning the McDonald's LPGA Championship for the third time to claim her fifth major title overall.

In 2007, she won the Jamie Farr Owens Corning Classic for the fifth time, making her the fourth player in LPGA history to win the same tournament five or more times (Annika Sörenstam accomplished this feat at two tournaments).

Perhaps the greatest tribute to her career to date came in a column by Golf World writer Eric Adelson in 2008, who called Pak "a pioneer... who changed the face of golf even more than Tiger Woods." When Pak came to the LPGA in 1998, she was the only South Korean player. Ten years later, she was one of 45 South Koreans on tour, and the single largest source of revenue for the LPGA was the sale of TV rights in South Korea.

Pak was the only South Korean on the LPGA Tour in the year 1998. Her spectacular triumph at the 1998 U.S. Women's Open encouraged many South Korean women to take up golf as a sport. She is regarded as a leader of the game in her home country and has also inspired the new generations of LPGA players Na Yeon Choi and Inbee Park who have followed her footsteps at the LPGA level. A statue of her now stands outside Gongju's stadium. This statue commemorates her signature moment: a successful shot from a water hazard to remain tied for first place in the 1998 U.S. Women's Open; this allowed her to force a sudden death playoff which she then won with "a tremendous birdie putt from nearly 20 feet on the second hole." This was a victory named by the Korea Times as the 3rd most acclaimed moment in 60 years of South Korean sports history. Her shot was shown as the basis for the first episode of the South Korean TV drama Birdie Buddy.

On 17 March 2016, Pak announced that she would retire following the 2016 season. She retired the following 13 October, after completing the first round of South Korea's lone LPGA-sanctioned event, the LPGA KEB Hana Bank Championship.

== Professional wins (39) ==
=== LPGA Tour wins (25) ===
Legend
Major championships (5)
Other LPGA Tour (20)

No.	Date	Tournament	Winning score	To par	Margin of victory	Runner(s)-up
1	17 May 1998	McDonald's LPGA Championship	65-68-72-68=273	−11	3 strokes	(United States) Donna Andrews (England) Lisa Hackney
2	5 Jul 1998	U.S. Women's Open	69-70-75-76=290	+6	Playoff	(United States) Jenny Chuasiriporn (a)
3	12 Jul 1998	Jamie Farr Kroger Classic	71-61-63-66=261	−23	9 strokes	(England) Lisa Hackney
4	26 Jul 1998	Giant Eagle LPGA Classic	65-69-67=201	−15	1 stroke	(United States) Dottie Pepper
5	20 Jun 1999	ShopRite LPGA Classic	63-69-66=198	−15	2 strokes	(England) Trish Johnson
6	4 Jul 1999	Jamie Farr Kroger Classic	68-69-68-71=276	−8	Playoff	(Sweden) Carin Koch (United States) Kelli Kuehne (Australia) Mardi Lunn (United States) Sherri Steinhauer (Australia) Karrie Webb
7	12 Sep 1999	Samsung World Championship of Women's Golf	67-71-70-72=280	−8	1 stroke	(Australia) Karrie Webb
8	14 Nov 1999	PageNet Championship	66-66-74-70=276	−12	Playoff	(England) Laura Davies (Australia) Karrie Webb
9	16 Jan 2001	YourLife Vitamins LPGA Classic	71-68-64=203	−13	4 strokes	(United States) Penny Hammel (Sweden) Carin Koch
10	22 Apr 2001	Longs Drugs Challenge	66-71-71=208	−8	2 strokes	(United States) Laura Diaz
11	8 Jul 2001	Jamie Farr Kroger Classic	70-62-69-68=269	−15	2 strokes	(Sweden) Maria Hjorth
12	5 Aug 2001	Women's British Open'^{[1]}	71-70-70-66=277	−11	2 strokes	(South Korea) Mi Hyun Kim
13	30 Sep 2001	AFLAC Champions	70-67-64-71=272	−16	5 strokes	(Canada) Lorie Kane
14	7 Apr 2002	The Office Depot Championship	68-68-73=209	−7	1 stroke	(Sweden) Annika Sörenstam
15	9 Jun 2002	McDonald's LPGA Championship	71-70-68-70=279	−5	3 strokes	(United States) Beth Daniel
16	25 Aug 2002	First Union Betsy King Classic	70-68-66-63=267	−21	3 strokes	(United States) Angela Stanford
17	13 Oct 2002	Mobile LPGA Tournament of Champions	65-70-67-66=268	−20	4 strokes	(Sweden) Carin Koch (Scotland) Catriona Matthew
18	27 Oct 2002	Sports Today CJ Nine Bridges Classic	65-76-72=213	−3	6 strokes	(Sweden) Carin Koch
19	23 Mar 2003	Safeway PING	65-68-68-64=265	−23	1 stroke	(South Korea) Grace Park
20	27 Apr 2003	Chick-fil-A Charity Championship	71-65-64=200	−16	Playoff	(Australia) Shani Waugh
21	18 Aug 2003	Jamie Farr Kroger Classic	69-67-64-71=271	−13	2 strokes	(Colombia) Marisa Baena (South Korea) Han Hee-won
22	9 May 2004	Michelob ULTRA Open at Kingsmill	70-71-69-65=275	−9	2 strokes	(United States) Juli Inkster (Mexico) Lorena Ochoa
23	11 Jun 2006	McDonald's LPGA Championship	71-69-71-69=280	−8	Playoff	(Australia) Karrie Webb
24	15 Jul 2007	Jamie Farr Owens Corning Classic	63-68-69-67=267	−17	3 strokes	(United States) Morgan Pressel
25	16 May 2010	Bell Micro LPGA Classic	69-66-68=203	−13	Playoff	(United States) Brittany Lincicome (Norway) Suzann Pettersen

^{1} Co-sanctioned by the Ladies European Tour.

LPGA Tour playoff record (6–0)

No.	Year	Tournament	Opponent(s)	Result
1	1998	U.S. Women's Open	(United States) Jenny Chuasiriporn (a)	Won with birdie on second extra hole after 18-hole playoff (Chuasiriporn:73, Pak:73)
2	1999	Jamie Farr Kroger Classic	(Sweden) Carin Koch (United States) Kelli Kuehne (Australia) Mardi Lunn (United States) Sherri Steinhauer (Australia) Karrie Webb	Won with birdie on first extra hole
3	1999	PageNet Championship	(England) Laura Davies (Australia) Karrie Webb	Won with birdie on first extra hole
4	2003	Chick-fil-A Charity Championship	(Australia) Shani Waugh	Won with par on fourth extra hole
5	2006	McDonald's LPGA Championship	(Australia) Karrie Webb	Won with birdie on first extra hole
6	2010	Bell Micro LPGA Classic	(United States) Brittany Lincicome (Norway) Suzann Pettersen	Won with birdie on third extra hole Pettersen eliminated by par on second hole

=== LPGA of Korea Tour wins (14) ===
No.	Date	Tournament	Winning score	To par	Margin of victory	Runner(s)-up
1	26 Sep 1992	Lyle and Scott Women's Open (as an amateur)	71-72=143	−1	Playoff	(South Korea) Won Jae-sook
2	1 May 1993	Tomboy Women's Open (as an amateur)	76-71-72=219	+3	Playoff	(South Korea) Kim Soon-mi
3	29 Apr 1995	Tomboy Women's Open (as an amateur)	76-71-68=215	−1	3 strokes	(South Korea) Kim Soon-mi (South Korea) Lee O-soon
4	17 Jun 1995	Midopa Women's Open (as an amateur)	72-68-68=209	−7	4 strokes	(South Korea) Lee O-soon
5	24 Jun 1995	Christian Dior Women's Open (as an amateur)	65-67-67=200	−16	10 strokes	(South Korea) Lee O-soon
6	8 Oct 1995	Seoul Women's Open (as an amateur)	69-73-72=214	−2	2 strokes	(South Korea) Ku Ok-hee
7	24 Aug 1996	Dongil Renown Ladies Classic	65-74-70=209	−7	1 strokes	(South Korea) Song Chae-eun
8	1 Sep 1996	FILA Women's Open	70-67-69=206	−10	4 strokes	(South Korea) Bu Hyeong-soon
9	8 Sep 1996	Diadora Cup SBS Professional Golf Challenge	77-73-77-74=301	+13	1 stroke	(South Korea) Song Chae-eun
10	6 Oct 1996	Hanwha Cup Seoul Women's Open	68-71-71=210	−6	Playoff	(South Korea) Chung Il-mi
11	28 Sep 1997	Cheil Industries Rose Women's Open	68-69-73=210	−6	Playoff	(South Korea) Chung Il-mi
12	5 Oct 1997	Hanwha Cup Seoul Women's Open	71-68-68=207	−9	9 strokes	(South Korea) Park Hyun-soon (South Korea) Mi-Hyun Kim
13	18 May 2003	MBC-Xcanvas Women's Open	69-65-70=204	−12	3 strokes	(South Korea) Ji Eun-hee (amateur)
14	23 Sep 2012	KDB Daewoo Securities Classic	69-66-65=200	−16	3 strokes	(South Korea) Heo Yoon-kyung

== Major championships ==
=== Wins (5) ===
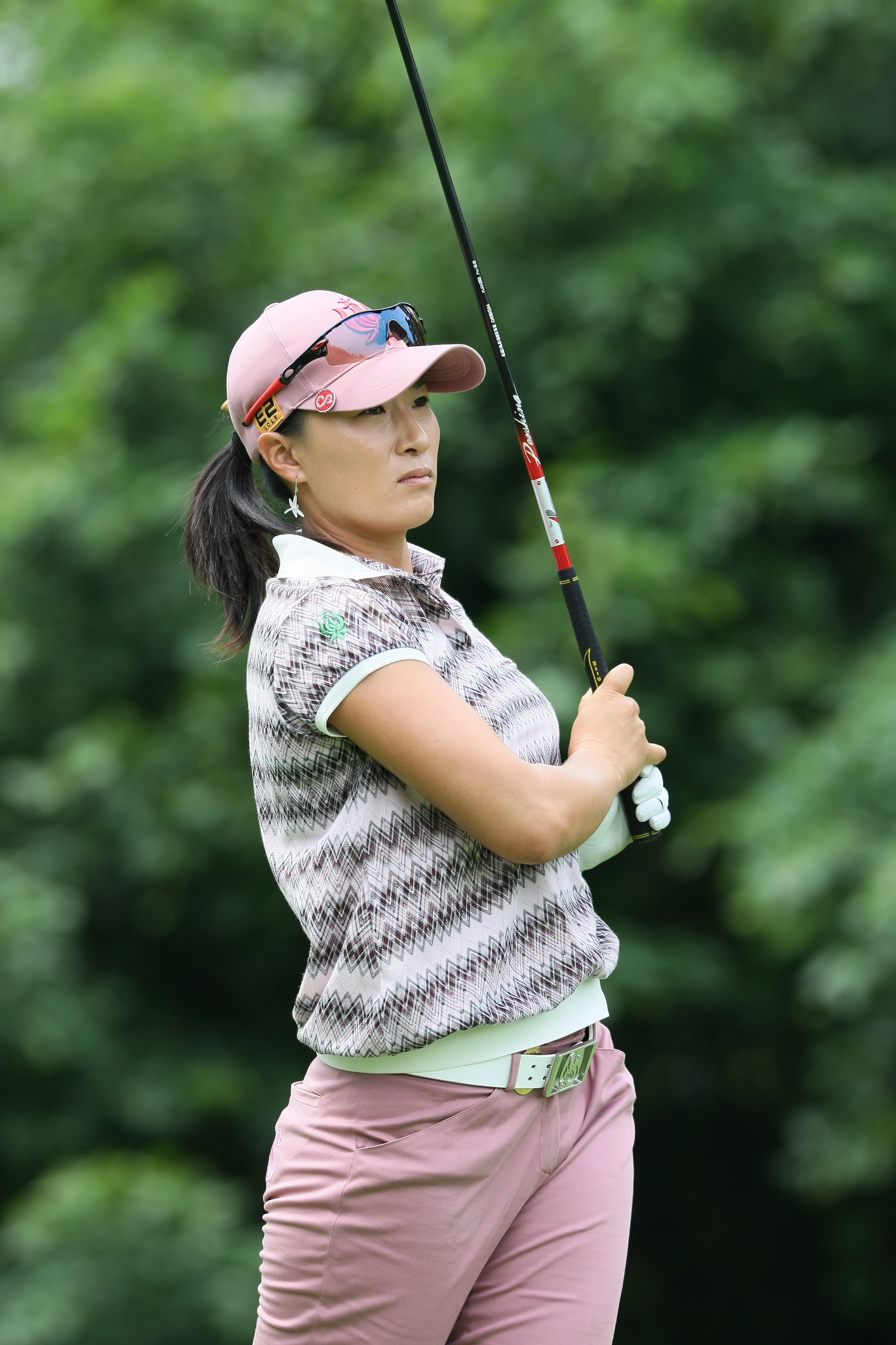
Pak at the 2009 LPGA Championship in Bulle Rock, Maryland

Year	Championship	Winning score	To par	Margin of victory	Runner(s)-up
1998	McDonald's LPGA Championship	65-68-72-68=273	−11	3 strokes	(United States) Donna Andrews, (England) Lisa Hackney
1998	U.S. Women's Open	69-70-75-76=290	+6	Playoff ^{1}	(United States) Jenny Chuasiriporn (a)
2001	Women's British Open	71-70-70-66=277	−11	2 strokes	(South Korea) Mi Hyun Kim
2002	McDonald's LPGA Championship	71-70-68-70=279	−5	3 strokes	(United States) Beth Daniel
2006	McDonald's LPGA Championship	71-69-71-69=280	−8	Playoff ^{2}	(Australia) Karrie Webb

^{1} Defeated Chuasiriporn on the second hole of a sudden-death playoff, after an 18-hole playoff round
^{2} Defeated Webb on the first hole of a sudden-death playoff

=== Results timeline ===
Results not in chronological order before 2015.

Tournament	1997	1998	1999	2000
ANA Inspiration			T13	T15
Women's PGA Championship		1	T7	T3
U.S. Women's Open	T21	1	T14	T15
du Maurier Classic		T41	T13	T7

Tournament	2001	2002	2003	2004	2005	2006	2007	2008	2009	2010	2011	2012
ANA Inspiration	T11	T9	T15	T16	T27	T45	T10	T10	T40	T15	T10	T8
Women's PGA Championship	T39	1	T46	T17	CUT	1	T33	T46	T65	CUT	T34	T19
U.S. Women's Open	2	5	50	T32	T45	T3	T4	CUT	CUT	CUT	T45	T9
Women's British Open ^	1	T11	2	T21	WD	WD	T5	CUT	T20		T14	

Tournament	2013	2014	2015	2016
ANA Inspiration	T19	T4	CUT	
Women's PGA Championship	T28		WD	WD
U.S. Women's Open	CUT	T38		CUT
Women's British Open	T47	WD		
The Evian Championship ^^	T4	T47		

^ The Women's British Open replaced the du Maurier Classic as an LPGA major in 2001
^^ The Evian Championship was added as a major in 2013

Win
Top 10
Did not play

CUT = missed the half-way cut
WD = withdrew
"T" = tied for place

=== Summary ===
Tournament	Wins	2nd	3rd	Top-5	Top-10	Top-25	Events	Cuts made
ANA Inspiration	0	0	0	1	6	13	17	16
Women's PGA Championship	3	0	1	4	5	7	18	14
U.S. Women's Open	1	1	1	5	6	9	19	14
Women's British Open	1	1	0	3	3	7	12	8
The Evian Championship	0	0	0	1	1	1	2	2
du Maurier Classic	0	0	0	0	1	2	3	3
Totals	5	2	2	14	22	39	71	57

- Most consecutive cuts made – 29 (1997 U.S. Open – 2005 Kraft Nabisco)
- Longest streak of top-10s – 5 (2001 U.S. Open – 2002 U.S. Open)

== LPGA Tour career summary ==
Year	Tournaments played	Cuts made	Wins	2nd	3rd	Top 10s	Best finish	Earnings ($)	Money list rank	Scoring average	Scoring rank
1998	27	26	4	0	0	8	1	872,170	2	71.41	13
1999	27	24	4	0	0	10	1	956,926	3	70.77	8
2000	23	22	0	0	2	11	3	550,376	12	72.49	10
2001	21	20	5	5	2	12	1	1,623,009	2	69.69	2
2002	24	24	5	1	2	17	1	1,722,281	2	69.85	2
2003	26	25	3	6	0	20	1	1,611,928	2	70.03	1
2004	19	17	1	1	0	5	1	682,669	11	71.34	27
2005	12	9	0	0	0	0	T27	62,628	102	74.21	116
2006	23	21	1	0	2	8	1	884,961	13	71.65	23
2007	23	20	1	0	1	8	1	820,129	16	71.74	14
2008	17	10	0	1	0	3	2	366,143	52	72.59	66
2009	24	20	0	1	0	2	2	447,683	30	71.98	37
2010	15	9	1	0	0	3	1	368,839	32	72.45	49
2011	20	17	0	0	0	4	4	415,447	27	71.97	26
2012	12	9	0	0	0	5	4	430,338	33	71.18	16
2013	18	14	0	0	0	3	T4	440,162	34	71.88	41
2014	16	10	0	0	0	3	T4	271,888	59	71.75	45
2015	8	3	0	0	0	1	T10	36,083	122	74.25	n/a
2016	10	3	0	0	0	0	T27	20,053	150	69.54	95

- official through 2016 season

== World ranking ==
Position in Women's World Golf Rankings at the end of each calendar year.

Year	World ranking	Source
2006	12	
2007	10	
2008	31	
2009	43	
2010	32	
2011	36	
2012	26	
2013	30	
2014	59	
2015	228	
2016	469	

== Team appearances ==
Amateur

- Espirito Santo Trophy (representing South Korea): 1994

Professional

- Lexus Cup (representing Asia team): 2006 (winners), 2007 (winners), 2008

== Filmography ==
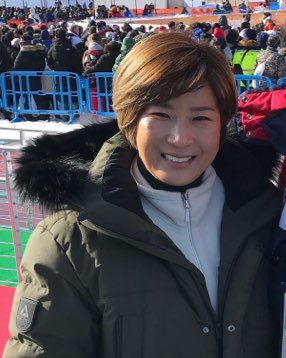
Park pictured 2018

=== Television shows ===
Year	Title	Role	Notes	Ref.
2017–2018	Law of the Jungle in Cook Islands	Cast member	Episode 293–298	
2018	Soo Mi's Side Dishes	Regular member	Episode 93–99; Guest (Episode 32)	
2020–2022	Sporty Sisters	Regular member	Season 1–2	
2020	Law of the Jungle in Wild Korea	Cast member	Episode 416–419	
2020	Law of the Jungle – Zero Point	Cast member	Episode 423–426	
2021	Match of the Century: AI vs. Human	Regular member		
2021	Wild Wild Quiz	Cast member	Episode 1–12	
2021	Three Park: The Second Heart	Main host		
2021	Ceremony Club	Main cast		
2022	Operation Time	Host		
2022	Tomorrow is a Hero-Kanbu	Host		
2022	IT Live from Today	Host		
2022	Sports Golden Bell	contestant	Chuseok Special	
2023	The Queen	Host	with Leeteuk and Jang Sung-kyu	
2023–present	Dogs Are Incredible	Host		

=== Web shows ===
Year	Title	Role	Ref.
2021–present	Cerizabeth	Host	

== Awards and nominations ==
Name of the award ceremony, year presented, category, nominee of the award, and the result of the nomination
Award ceremony	Year	Category	Nominee / Work	Result	Ref.
Brand of the Year Awards	2022	Spotiner	Pak Se-ri	Won	
Brand Customer Loyalty Award	2022	Spoiler division	Pak Se-ri	Won	

== See also ==
- List of female golfers
- List of golfers with most LPGA Tour wins
- List of golfers with most LPGA major championship wins
