= Amanda Blumenherst =

American professional golfer (born 1986)

Personal information
- Nationality: United States
- Born: November 4, 1986 (age 39) Scottsdale, Arizona, U.S.
- Height: 5 ft 9 in (1.75 m)
- Spouse: Nate Freiman

Career
- Sport: Golf
- College: Duke University
- Turned professional: 2009
- Current tours: Futures Tour (joined 2009); LPGA Tour (joined 2010)

Best results in LPGA major championships
- Chevron Championship: 30th: 2008
- Women's PGA C'ship: 71st: 2010
- U.S. Women's Open: T10: 2006
- Women's British Open: T54: 2011
- Evian Championship: 74th: 2013

Achievements and awards
- William and Mousie Powell Award: 2013
- Honda Sports Award: 2008
- (For a full list of awards, see here)

Amanda Blumenherst (born November 4, 1986) is an American professional golfer who plays on the U.S.-based LPGA Tour. She was a three-time National Player of the Year at Duke University and won the U.S. Women's Amateur title in 2008. In 2013, she announced that she would take a leave from professional golf to spend more time with her husband, major league baseball player Nate Freiman.

== Early life ==
In 1986, Blumenherst was born in Scottsdale, Arizona, the daughter of Amy (McClure) and David Blumenherst. She began playing golf at the age of four.

She attended high school at Xavier College Preparatory in Phoenix, where she was a four-time Rolex All-American and was the third-ranked national recruit as a senior. She led Xavier College Prep to the 5A state championships for four straight years. She held Arizona's 5A High School Girls' Golf State Tournament record with a score of 69–66=135 (−9).

== Amateur career ==
At Duke University in Durham, North Carolina, Blumenherst was named the National Freshman of the Year by numerous publications. She had the lowest stroke average by a Duke freshman, 71.62, and was the second freshman at Duke to win her first collegiate golf tournament. She set a Blue Devil freshman record with a 54-hole total of 208 at the Mason Rudolph Championship.

Blumenherst was named the NGCA National Player of the Year for the second year in a row. She won the Golfstat Cup to join Lorena Ochoa as the only two-time winners. She set a school-record 71.00 stroke average, and tied an NCAA record with a 63 (−9) at the NCAA East Regionals.

Blumenherst won her second consecutive Honda Sports Award for golf as the best collegiate female golfer, which put her in the running for the Honda-Broderick Cup award as the collegiate Female Athlete of the Year. She was named the ACC Player of the Year for the third consecutive year, and had 30 career top 10 finishes. She won her third straight individual ACC championship in Daytona Beach, Florida, and finished fifth at the NCAA championships at Albuquerque. She led the Blue Devils to a second-place team finish at the NCAA East Regional and a third-place national finish in New Mexico. Blumenherst won a third "NCGA" National Player of the Year award.

In her senior year, Blumenherst saw less impressive results, winning only once during the regular season, while still being named the ACC Co-Player of the Year. She graduated magna cum laude with a 3.84 GPA from Duke in May 2009 with a degree in history and minors in English and Theater.

She was awarded the Dinah Shore Trophy Award by the LPGA Foundation for the second consecutive year. The award is presented to the female collegiate golfer who excels in both academics and athletics, while also demonstrating outstanding leadership skills and community service. In 2009, Blumenherst was a semi-finalist (one of twelve) for the Sullivan Award given annually to the world's most outstanding amateur athlete. She was also one of nine finalists for the 2009 NCAA Woman of the Year Award.

In 2008 Blumenherst finished 30th at the LPGA Kraft Nabisco Championship on the LPGA Tour, and in 2006 and 2008 she helped the U.S. win the Curtis Cup. At the 2006 U.S. Women's Open, she finished tied for tenth and shared low amateur honors with Jane Park. The following year she finished tied for 50th at the 2007 U.S. Women's Open, one of four amateurs to make the cut. She advanced to the second round of match play at the U.S. Women's Amateur Public Links (WAPL), and at the North and South Women's Amateur. Blumenherst was the runner-up at the 2007 U.S. Women's Amateur, falling 1 up to Mariajo Uribe in 36 holes. In 2008, she again made the cut at the U.S Women's Open and finished tied for 38th. A month later she won the 2008 U.S. Women's Amateur in Eugene, Oregon, with a 2 & 1 victory over NCAA champion, Azahara Muñoz, in the 36-hole final on August 10.

== Professional career ==
On May 27, 2009, Blumenherst announced that she turned professional and had signed with the IMG sports management company and with Nike Golf as a paid member of its touring staff. Her amateur accomplishments qualified her for membership of the Futures Tour and she played in six Futures Tour events in the summer of 2009, with three top-10 finishes. Blumenherst was the medalist at the first stage of the LPGA Qualifying Tournament in September; she was 16 under par over four rounds to win by six strokes. Later that month Blumenherst, entered on a sponsor's exemption, finished tied for 5th at the CVS/Pharmacy LPGA Challenge in California. In December at Daytona Beach, she won the five-round LPGA Final Qualifying Tournament by two strokes to earn her tour card for 2010.

Blumenherst played the first two tournaments of the 2010 LPGA season, the Honda PTT LPGA Thailand and the HSBC Women's Champions, as sponsors' invites. She finished T18 and 62nd, respectively, but as a sponsor invite her earnings did not count on the official LPGA money list. She went on to play in 22 tournaments and finished 51st on the 2010 money list and 4th in the LPGA Rookie of the Year standings, won by Muñoz.

== Personal life ==
Blumenherst married Oakland A's baseball player Nate Freiman in December 2012. He holds Duke University's career home run record, and the school's second-highest all-time batting average. The two were Duke's ACC Senior Male and Female Athletes of the Year in 2009.

In August 2013, she announced that she would take a leave from professional golf at the end of the year to spend more time with her husband. She said: "I don't want to say I'm retiring, because you never know what will happen. Maybe I'll decide in a couple years to come back, and this will just be a little break, you never know." The couple had a son, William David, in November 2014.

== Awards and honors ==
- In 2005, Blumenherst earned Arizona's Female High School Senior Scholar-Athlete of the Year
- In 2006, she earned the Edith Cummings Munson Golf Award
- In 2007 and 2008, Blumenherst earned the Honda Sports Award
- From 2007 through 2009, she earned the Nancy Lopez Award
- In 2007, Blumenherst earned Golf Week National Player of the Year

== Results in LPGA majors ==
Tournament	2006	2007	2008	2009	2010	2011	2012	2013
Kraft Nabisco Championship			30 LA			T41	T70	CUT
LPGA Championship					71	CUT	CUT	CUT
U.S. Women's Open	T10 TLA	T50	T38	T52	CUT	CUT	CUT	
Women's British Open					CUT	T54	CUT	
The Evian Championship ^								74

^ The Evian Championship was added as a major in 2013.

Top 10
Did not play

LA = Low amateur
CUT = missed the half-way cut
T = tied

=== Summary ===
Tournament	Wins	2nd	3rd	Top-5	Top-10	Top-25	Events	Cuts made
Kraft Nabisco Championship	0	0	0	0	0	0	4	3
LPGA Championship	0	0	0	0	0	0	4	1
U.S. Women's Open	0	0	0	0	1	1	7	4
Women's British Open	0	0	0	0	0	0	3	1
The Evian Championship	0	0	0	0	0	0	1	1
Totals	0	0	0	0	1	1	19	10

- Most consecutive cuts made – 6 (2006 U.S. Open – 2010 LPGA)
- Longest streak of top-10s – 1

== LPGA Tour career summary ==
Year	Tournaments played	Cuts made*	Wins	2nd	3rd	Top 10s	Best finish	Earnings ($)	Money list rank	Scoring average	Scoring rank
2006	3	2	0	0	0	1	T10	n/a		72.00	n/a
2007	1	1	0	0	0	0	T50	n/a		74.00	n/a
2008	2	2	0	0	0	0	30	n/a		73.87	n/a
2009	5	4	0	0	0	1	T5	74,025^{1}	n/a	71.56	n/a
2010	22	15	0	0	0	2	T7	178,181^{2}	51	72.86	64
2011	22	15	0	0	0	1	T9	164,930	54	73.16	66
2012	23	12	0	0	0	1	T5	105,668	76	74.11	114
2013	16	6	0	0	0	0	T13	49,182	102	73.72	124

- official as of November 24, 2013

* Includes matchplay and other events with no cut.
^{1} Blumenhurst turned pro in May 2009 and was not an LPGA member; earnings were unofficial for the 2009 LPGA money list.
^{2} Earnings at the 2010 Honda PTT LPGA Thailand ($16,156) and 2010 HSBC Women's Champions ($3,251) were unofficial under LPGA rules and are not included.

== U.S. national team appearances ==
Amateur

- Junior Solheim Cup: 2002 (winners), 2003
- Curtis Cup: 2006 (winners), 2008 (winners)
- Espirito Santo Trophy: 2006, 2008
