= 2006 U.S. Women's Open =

Coordinates: 41.462°N 71.347°W

Tournament information
- Dates: June 30 – July 3, 2006
- Location: Newport, Rhode Island
- Course: Newport Country Club
- Organized by: USGA
- Tour: LPGA Tour

Statistics
- Par: 71
- Length: 6,616 yards (6,050 m)
- Field: 155 players, 68 after cut
- Cut: 150 (+8)
- Prize fund: $3.1 million
- Winner's share: $560,000

Champion
- (Sweden) Annika Sörenstam
- 284 (E), playoff

Location in the United States
Location in Rhode Island

The 2006 U.S. Women's Open was the 61st U.S. Women's Open, held June 30 to July 3 at Newport Country Club in Newport, Rhode Island.

Delayed by fog for a day, the first round started on Friday and the final two rounds were played on Sunday. The champion was Annika Sörenstam, the winner of an 18-hole playoff on Monday over Pat Hurst by four strokes, 70 to 74. The two had finished at even par (284) after 72 holes on Sunday, two strokes ahead of Se Ri Pak, Stacy Prammanasudh, and Michelle Wie. It was Sörenstam's third victory in the championship, the first in a decade after winning consecutive titles in 1995 and 1996, and was her tenth and final major championship victory. With the win, Sörenstam went over $20 million in career earnings.

American collegians Amanda Blumenherst and Jane Park were the low amateurs and finished tied for tenth.

This was the final full-round playoff in the U.S. Women's Open; the format was changed to a three-hole aggregate for 2007 and first used in 2011. The event was televised by ESPN and NBC Sports, with the Monday playoff on ESPN.

== Course layout ==
Hole	1	2	3	4	5	6	7	8	9	Out	10	11	12	13	14	15	16	17	18	In	Total
Yards	532	298	405	137	180	426	359	440	436	3,213	480	363	340	211	449	386	549	185	440	3,403	6,616
Par	5	4	4	3	3	4	4	4	4	35	5	4	4	3	4	4	5	3	4	36	71

== Round summaries ==
=== First round ===
Friday, June 30, 2006

Place	Player	Score	To par
T1	(United States) Pat Hurst	69	−2
T1	(United States) Jane Park (a)	69	−2
T1	(South Korea) Se Ri Pak	69	−2
T1	(Sweden) Annika Sörenstam	69	−2
T5	(United States) Amanda Blumenherst (a)	70	−1
T5	(Wales) Becky Morgan	70	−1
T5	(South Korea) Park Hee-jung	70	−1
T5	(United States) Michelle Wie	70	−1
T5	(South Korea) Yim Sung-ah	70	−1
T10	(South Korea) Shi Hyun Ahn	71	E
T10	(United States) Brandie Burton	71	E
T10	(Italy) Silvia Cavalleri	71	E
T10	(United States) Paula Creamer	71	E
T10	(South Korea) Jee Young Lee	71	E
T10	(Mexico) Lorena Ochoa	71	E
T10	(United States) Kim Saiki	71	E

=== Second round ===
Saturday, July 1, 2006

Place	Player	Score	To par
T1	(United States) Pat Hurst	69-71=140	−2
T1	(Sweden) Annika Sörenstam	69-71=140	−2
T3	(South Korea) Shi Hyun Ahn	71-71=142	E
T3	(United States) Jane Park (a)	69-73=142	E
T3	(United States) Michelle Wie	70-72=142	E
T6	(United States) Paula Creamer	71-72=143	+1
T6	(United States) Juli Inkster	73-70=143	+1
T6	(South Korea) Jeong Jang	72-71=143	+1
T6	(South Korea) Se Ri Pak	69-74=143	+1
T6	(United States) Stacy Prammanasudh	72-71=143	+1

=== Third round ===
Sunday, July 2, 2006 (morning)

Place	Player	Score	To par
T1	(United States) Brittany Lincicome	72-72-69=213	E
T1	(Sweden) Annika Sörenstam	69-71-73=213	E
T1	(United States) Michelle Wie	70-72-71=213	E
T4	(United States) Juli Inkster	73-70-71=214	+1
T4	(United States) Stacy Prammanasudh	72-71-71=214	+1
T6	(Sweden) Sophie Gustafson	72-72-71=215	+2
T6	(United States) Pat Hurst	69-71-75=215	+2
T8	(South Korea) Shi Hyun Ahn	71-71-74=216	+3
T8	(South Korea) Jee Young Lee	71-75-70=216	+3
T10	(South Korea) Se Ri Pak	69-74-74=217	+4
T10	(United States) Jane Park (a)	69-73-75=217	+4

=== Final round ===
Sunday, July 2, 2006 (afternoon)

Place	Player	Score	To par	Money ($)
T1	(Sweden) Annika Sörenstam	69-71-73-71=284	E	Playoff
T1	(United States) Pat Hurst	69-71-75-69=284	E	Playoff
T3	(South Korea) Se Ri Pak	69-74-74-69=286	+2	156,038
T3	(United States) Stacy Prammanasudh	72-71-71-72=286	+2	156,038
T3	(United States) Michelle Wie	70-72-71-73=286	+2	156,038
6	(United States) Juli Inkster	73-70-71-73=287	+3	103,575
7	(United States) Brittany Lincicome	72-72-69-78=291	+7	93,026
T8	(Australia) Rachel Hetherington	74-72-73-73=292	+8	82,460
T8	(South Korea) Shi Hyun Ahn	71-71-74-76=292	+8	82,460
T10	(United States) Amanda Blumenherst (a)	70-77-73-73=293	+9	0
T10	(United States) Jane Park (a)	69-73-75-76=293	+9	0
T10	(South Korea) Young Kim	75-69-75-74=293	+9	66,174
T10	(France) Patricia Meunier-Lebouc	72-73-73-75=293	+9	66,174
T10	(South Korea) Jee Young Lee	71-75-70-77=293	+9	66,174
T10	(Sweden) Sophie Gustafson	72-72-71-78=293	+9	66,174

==== Scorecard ====
Hole	1	2	3	4	5	6	7	8	9	10	11	12	13	14	15	16	17	18
Par	5	4	4	3	3	4	4	4	4	5	4	4	3	4	4	5	3	4
(Sweden) Sörenstam	−1	−2	−2	−2	−2	−2	E	+1	+2	+1	+1	+1	+1	+1	E	−1	E	E
(United States) Hurst	+1	E	E	+1	E	E	E	−1	E	E	+1	+1	+1	E	E	E	E	E
(South Korea) Pak	+4	+3	+3	+4	+4	+3	+2	+2	+2	+2	+2	+2	+2	+2	+3	+2	+2	+2
(United States) Prammanasudh	+1	+1	+2	+2	+2	+2	+2	+2	+2	+2	+3	+2	+2	+2	+2	+2	+2	+2
(United States) Wie	E	E	E	E	E	+1	+1	+1	+2	+2	+2	+1	+2	+2	+2	+2	+2	+2
(United States) Inkster	E	E	E	E	E	E	E	E	+1	+1	+2	+2	+2	+2	+2	+3	+3	+3
(United States) Lincicome	E	E	+1	+1	+1	+1	+3	+4	+4	+4	+4	+4	+4	+4	+6	+7	+7	+7
(Sweden) Gustafson	+2	+2	+2	+2	+2	+2	+5	+6	+6	+6	+6	+7	+8	+9	+10	+9	+9	+9

Cumulative tournament scores, relative to par

Birdie	Bogey	Double bogey	Triple bogey+

=== Playoff ===
Monday, July 3, 2006

Place	Player	Score	To par	Money ($)
1	(Sweden) Annika Sörenstam	34-36=70	−1	560,000
2	(United States) Pat Hurst	39-35=74	+3	335,000

==== Scorecard ====
Hole	1	2	3	4	5	6	7	8	9	10	11	12	13	14	15	16	17	18
Par	5	4	4	3	3	4	4	4	4	5	4	4	3	4	4	5	3	4
(Sweden) Sörenstam	−1	−1	−2	−2	−2	−1	−1	−1	−1	−1	−1	−2	−1	−1	−1	−1	−1	−1
(United States) Hurst	+1	+1	+1	+1	+1	+3	+3	+3	+4	+4	+4	+4	+4	+4	+4	+4	+4	+3

Birdie	Bogey	Double bogey
