= Helen Dobson =

English professional golfer (born 1971)

Personal information
- Nationality: England
- Born: 25 February 1971 (age 55) Skegness, England
- Height: 5 ft 7 in (1.70 m)

Career
- Sport: Golf
- Status: Professional
- Former tour: LPGA Tour (1993–2001)
- Professional wins: 2

Number of wins by tour
- LPGA Tour: 1
- Ladies European Tour: 1

Best results in LPGA major championships
- Chevron Championship: 2nd: 1998
- Women's PGA C'ship: T21: 1998
- U.S. Women's Open: T8: 1999
- du Maurier Classic: T20: 1999
- Women's British Open: DNP

Helen Dobson (born 25 February 1971) is an English professional golfer. She played on the LPGA Tour.

== Career ==
Dobson won the 1989 British Ladies Amateur.

Dobson won once on the LPGA Tour in 1993. She also finished second at the 1998 Nabisco Dinah Shore, finishing one shot behind the winner, Pat Hurst.

== Amateur wins ==
- 1989 English Women's Amateur Championship, British Ladies Amateur, Ladies' British Open Amateur Stroke Play Championship

== Professional wins (1) ==
=== LPGA Tour wins (1) ===
No.	Date	Tournament	Winning score	Margin of victory	Runner-up
1	6 Sep 1993	State Farm Rail Classic	–13 (67-65-71=203)	Playoff	(United States) Dottie Mochrie

LPGA Tour playoff record (1–0)

No.	Year	Tournament	Opponent	Result
1	1993	State Farm Rail Classic	(United States) Dottie Mochrie	Won with birdie on fifth extra hole

=== Ladies European Tour wins (1) ===
- 1993 BMW European Masters

== Team appearances ==
Amateur

- Women's Home Internationals (representing England): 1987 (winners), 1988, 1989 (winners)
- European Lady Junior's Team Championship (representing England): 1988 (winners), 1990
- Vagliano Trophy (representing Great Britain & Ireland): 1989 (winners)
- Curtis Cup (representing Great Britain & Ireland): 1990
- European Ladies' Team Championship (representing England): 1989
