= 1998 LPGA Championship =

Tournament information
- Dates: May 14–17, 1998
- Location: Wilmington, Delaware; 39.789°N 75.564°W
- Course: DuPont Country Club
- Tour: LPGA Tour
- Format: Stroke play - 72 holes

Statistics
- Par: 71
- Length: 6,386 yards (5,839 m)
- Field: 139 players, 72 after cut
- Cut: 146 (+4)
- Prize fund: $1.3 million
- Winner's share: $195,000

Champion
- (South Korea) Se Ri Pak
- 273 (−11)
- Location in United States Location in Delaware

The 1998 LPGA Championship was the 44th LPGA Championship, played May 14–17 at DuPont Country Club in Wilmington, Delaware. This was the second of four major championships on the LPGA Tour in 1998.

Twenty-year-old rookie Se Ri Pak led wire-to-wire to win the first of her five majors, three strokes ahead of runners-up Donna Andrews and Lisa Hackney. Less than two months later, Pak won the next major, the U.S. Women's Open.

The DuPont Country Club hosted this championship for eleven consecutive seasons, from 1994 through 2004.

== Final leaderboard ==
Sunday, May 17, 1998

Place	Player	Score	To par	Money ($)
1	(South Korea) Se Ri Pak	65-68-72-68=273	−11	195,000
T2	(United States) Donna Andrews	71-67-69-69=276	−8	104,666
T2	(England) Lisa Hackney	70-66-69-71=276	−8	104,666
T4	(United States) Wendy Ward	71-67-69-70=277	−7	62,145
T4	(Australia) Karrie Webb	71-73-67-66=277	−7	62,145
T6	(United States) Christa Johnson	69-71-67-71=278	−6	39,467
T6	(United States) Emilee Klein	72-67-68-71=278	−6	39,467
T6	(United States) Meg Mallon	71-69-68-70=278	−6	39,467
T9	(Sweden) Catrin Nilsmark	69-73-70-67=279	−5	29,110
T9	(United States) Kelly Robbins	69-71-68-71=279	−5	29,110
