= Brenda Corrie-Kuehn =

American amateur golfer

Brenda Corrie-Kuehn is an American amateur golfer.

== College career ==
Corrie-Kuehn was an All-American for the Wake Forest Demon Deacons.

== Amateur career ==
Corrie-Kuehn has played on two United States Curtis Cup teams, in 16 U.S. Women's Amateurs, and in nine U.S. Women's Opens. In 2001, she gained headlines for competing while 8 months pregnant, including experiencing a contraction during play. The Sunday following this U.S. Women's Open, Corrie-Kuehn gave birth. She lost in the finals of the 1995 U.S. Women's Mid-Amateur. She played on the U.S. team in two Espirito Santo Trophys, finishing runner up in 1996 and winning in 1998.

== U.S. national team appearances ==
- Curtis Cup: 1996, 1998 (winners)
- Espirito Santo Trophy: 1996, 1998 (winners)
