= Nate Freiman =

American baseball player (born 1986)

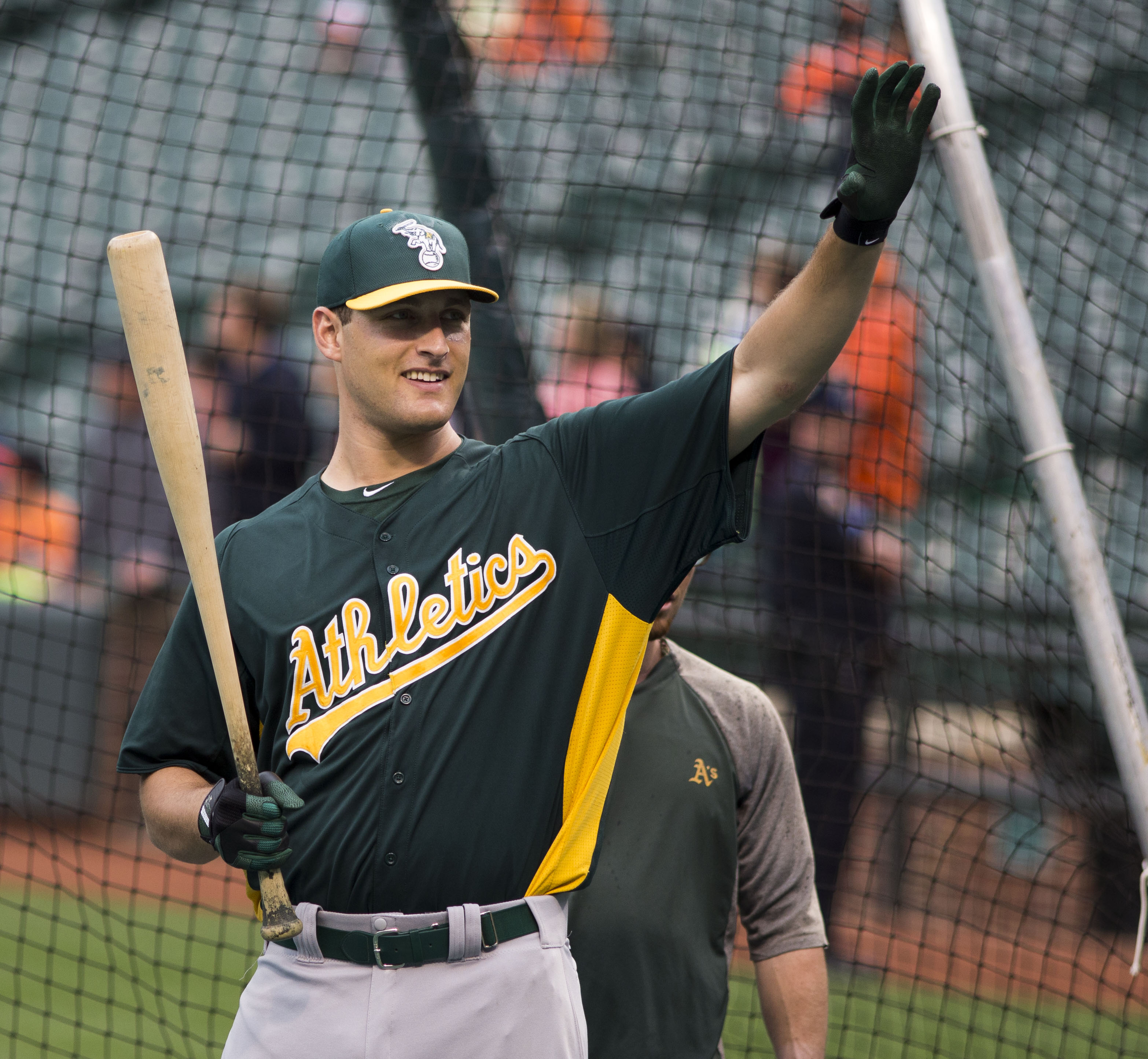
- Freiman with the Oakland Athletics
- First baseman
- Born: December 31, 1986 (age 39); Washington, D.C., U.S.
- Batted: Right Threw: Right

MLB debut
- April 3, 2013, for the Oakland Athletics

Last MLB appearance
- September 27, 2014, for the Oakland Athletics

MLB statistics
- Batting average: .256
- Home runs: 9
- Runs batted in: 39
- Stats at Baseball Reference

Teams
- Oakland Athletics (2013–2014)

Nathan Samuel Freiman (born December 31, 1986) is an American former professional baseball first baseman who played in Major League Baseball (MLB) for the Oakland Athletics in 2013 and 2014. In 2013, baseball writer Tim Brown wrote of his 6 ft 8 in (2.03 m) frame, "Near as anyone can tell, there's never been a taller major-league position player than Freiman."

Freiman holds Duke University's career home run record, and the school's second-highest all-time batting average. In the minor leagues, playing in the San Diego Padres organization, he led the Northwest League in runs batted in (RBIs) and extra base hits in 2009, was a Midwest League midseason All-Star in 2010, and was a California League postseason All-Star in 2011. In 2012, Freiman led the Texas League in RBIs and hits, and was both a midseason and postseason All-Star.

In December 2012, the Astros picked Freiman in the Rule 5 draft and added him to their 40-man roster. In March 2013, the Athletics claimed him off waivers, and he made his major league debut for the Athletics the following month. Freiman was voted American League Rookie of the Month for May 2013, and for the season he batted .274. He started 2014 in Triple-A. But after leading the Pacific Coast League in RBIs through June 29, while tying for seventh in the league in home runs, he was called back up to the A's. On July 2, 2015, the A's designated Freiman for assignment. He played for Team Israel at the 2017 World Baseball Classic.

Freiman is married to golfer Amanda Blumenherst. The two were Duke's ACC Senior Male and Female Athletes of the Year in 2009.

== Early life ==
Freiman is Jewish, and was born in Washington, D.C., to Len and Marjorie Freiman, a lawyer and a teacher of Judaism, respectively. Both of his parents have law degrees. His younger brother, Eli, was preparing for medical board examinations as Nate was starting his major league career early in the 2013 season.

Freiman grew up in the college town of Wellesley, Massachusetts, a western suburb of Boston. He was both a pitcher and a slugging catcher for the Wellesley High School baseball team for four years, graduating in 2005. In his junior year, he led the Bay State Conference with a .500 batting average and 19 RBIs. As a pitcher with a 90 miles per hour (140 km/h) fastball, he was 17–1 in his last two years. As a batter, he hit .500. He was a three-time all-Conference selection, and a two-year team captain.

Freiman was the best player in Massachusetts in his final two years: MVP of the Bay State Conference as a junior and senior, winner of the Division 2 Baseball Player of the Year Award as a junior and senior, and winner of the state's Gatorade Player of the Year and ranked by Perfect Game USA as the top high school prospect in Massachusetts as a senior. Baseball America rated him one of the top 50 high school prospects in the country.

At the same time, he lettered in indoor track (running 300 meter and 600 meter races as well as in the 55 meter hurdles) and was captain of the track team. He was also editor of his high school newspaper, The Bradford, and is a member of both the National Honor Society and the National Spanish Honor Society.

== College ==
Freiman attended Duke University in Durham, North Carolina, graduating in 2009 with a baccalaureate degree as a history major and a mathematics minor. He played college baseball for the Duke Blue Devils baseball team as a first baseman and catcher.

In 2006, his freshman year, Freiman injured his throwing arm in the first inning of his only start on the mound, ending his pitching aspirations. He made the All-Atlantic Coast Conference (ACC) academic baseball team and the ACC academic honor roll.

In 2007, he led the team with a .369 batting average, 7 home runs and 48 RBIs. He was an ESPN The Magazine Academic All-District III Second Team selection, and made the All-ACC academic team and the ACC academic honor roll for the second consecutive year. He played for the Orleans Cardinals of the Cape Cod League in the summer, and was fifth in the league in RBIs with 28.

In 2008, he led the team with a .381 batting average, 11 home runs and 46 RBIs, and was an ESPN The Magazine Academic All-District III first team selection and a member of the All-ACC Academic baseball team, the ACC academic honor roll and the Jewish All-American team by the Jewish Sports Review. He again played with the Orleans Cardinals in the Cape Cod League during the summer.

As a senior in 2009, Freiman led the ACC in home runs with 20, becoming only the second player in Duke history to hit 20 home runs in a season, and breaking the Blue Devils' all-time career home run record of 42 by Ryan Jackson. He also led Duke in homers, batting average (.352) and RBIs (62) for the third straight year, earning second-team All-ACC honors.

In addition to holding Duke's all-time career home run record (43), his .356 career batting average is the second-highest in school history. He also holds the Duke career slugging percentage record (.616), and ranks third among Duke players in career on-base percentage (.437), fifth in RBIs (180), sixth in doubles (51) and tied for ninth in hits (251). He earned all-ACC academic team and honor roll honors each season at Duke (as cited above), and is the only player in school history to receive the ACC Baseball Scholar-Athlete of the Year award, which he was voted in 2009. Academically, he graduated with a GPA of 3.84.

== Professional career ==
=== San Diego Padres (2009–12) ===
Freiman was drafted by the Texas Rangers as a college junior, in the 28th round of the 2008 Major League Baseball draft, but did not sign preferring to honor his commitment to Duke. He was then drafted by the San Diego Padres in the 8th round of the 2009 Major League Baseball draft, and signed for $40,000.

In 2009, playing for the Eugene Emeralds of the Low–A Northwest League, Freiman led the league for the season in RBIs (68), extra-base hits (33) and total bases (140), and was second in home runs (11) and doubles (22). He hit .294/.364/.484 over 72 games, and .336 with runners in scoring position. His 18-game hitting streak was the second-best in the league. Freiman was named Northwest League Player of the Week on August 24, 2009.

Freiman played for the Fort Wayne TinCaps of the Single–A Midwest League in 2010, and was a midseason All-Star and finished second to Khris Davis in the Midwest League All-Star Home Run Derby. He batted .294/.369/.457, led the league in doubles (43), and was fourth in RBIs (84) and hits (154).

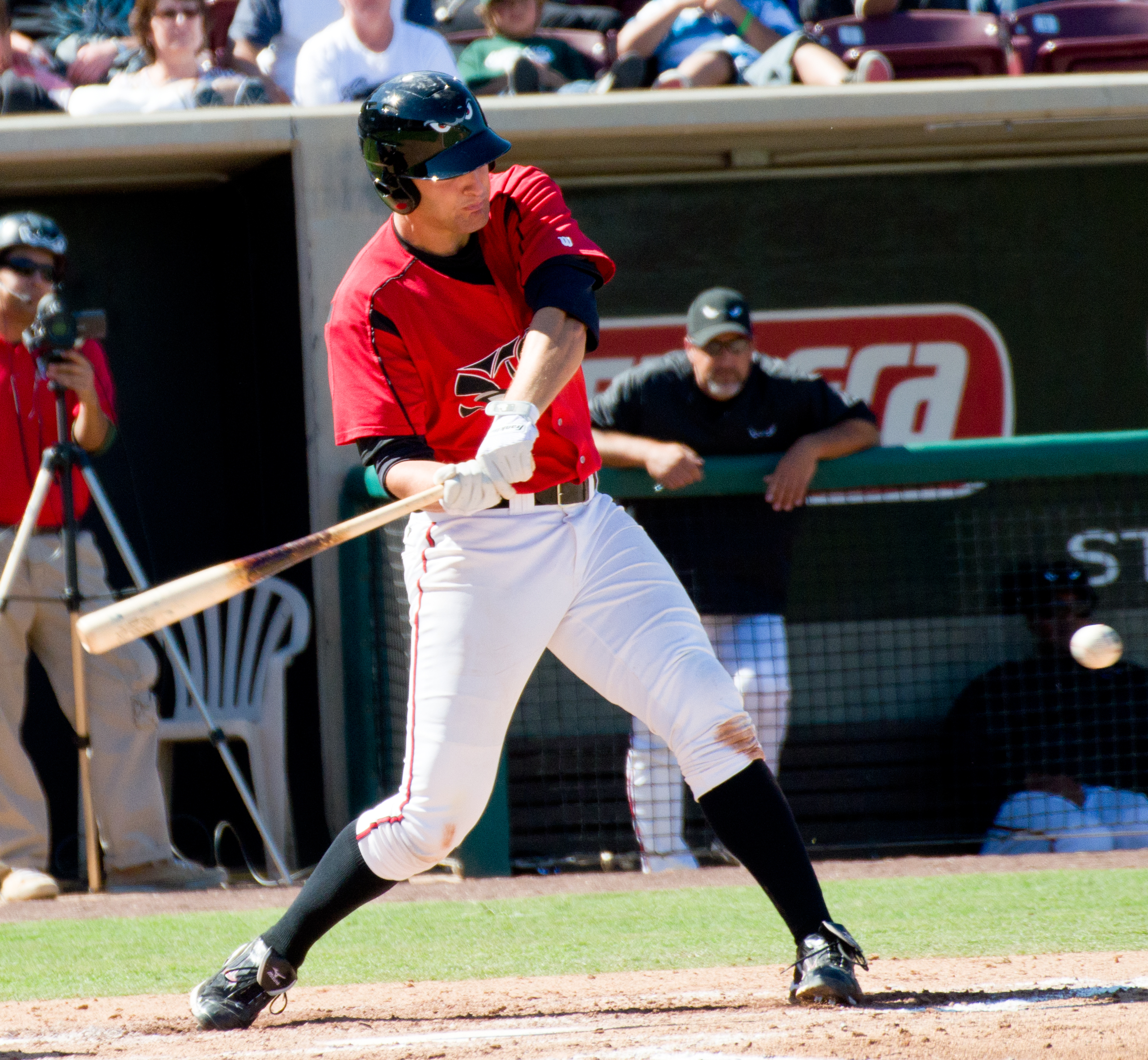
Freiman batting for the Lake Elsinore Storm in 2011

In 2011, Freiman played for the Lake Elsinore Storm of the High–A California League setting single-season club records with 22 home runs (tied for 6th in the league) and 111 RBIs (3rd in the league), and was named a postseason All-Star.

Freiman played for the San Antonio Missions of the Double–A Texas League in 2012, leading the league in RBIs (105; the highest total among all minor leaguers in the Padres system) and hits (154) and finishing second in extra-base hits (56) and total bases (259), third in home runs (24), fourth in doubles (31) and fifth in slugging percentage (.502). He hit .298 with a .370 on-base percentage in 137 games. He batted .336 with runners in scoring position. Against southpaws he batted .348, with 8 homers in only 112 at-bats. He was both a Texas League mid- and postSeason All-Star, and an MILB.com San Diego Padres All-Star. After the regular season, he played for the Peoria Javelinas in the Arizona Fall League.

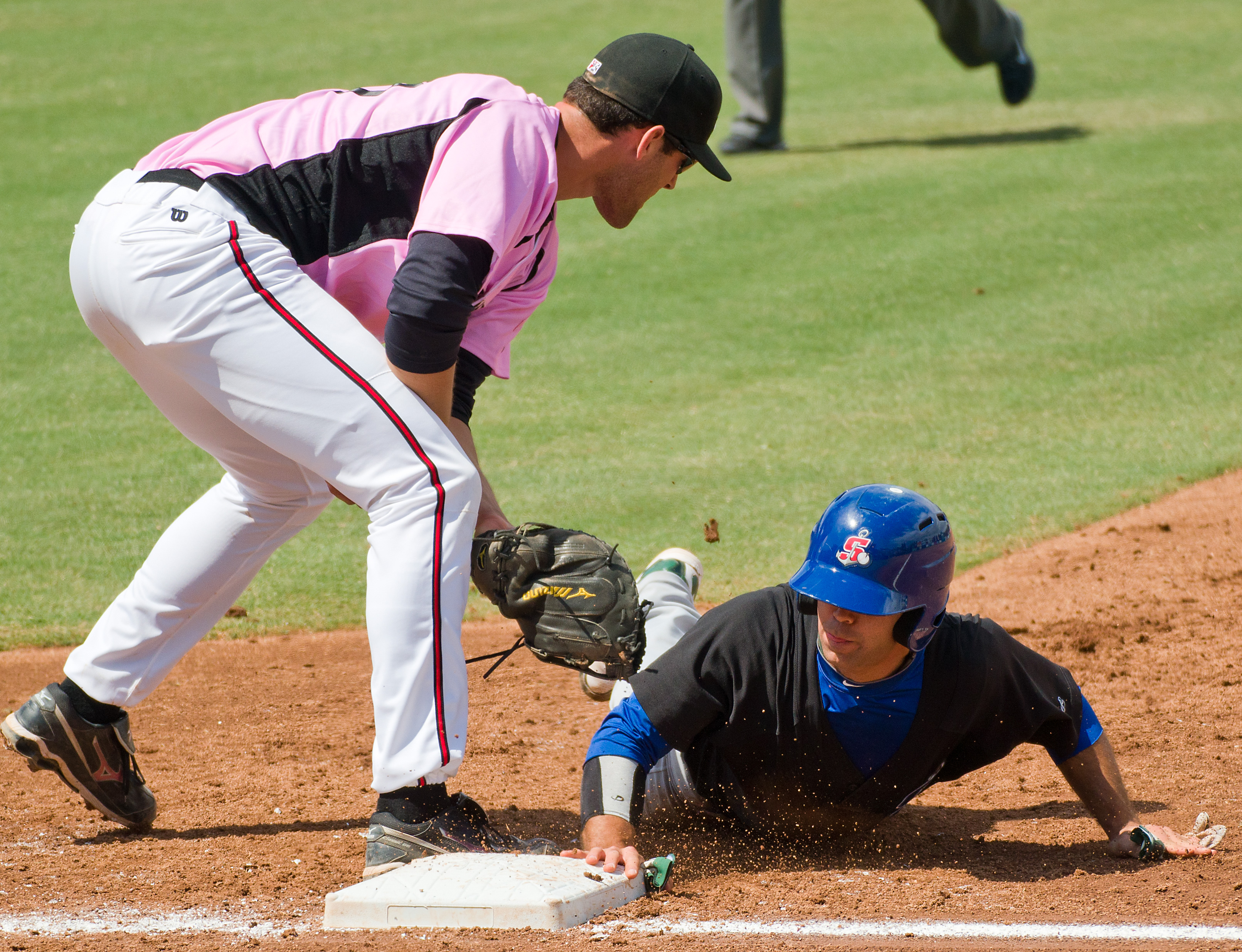
Freiman on defense, 2011

Through 2012, in his first four minor league seasons Freiman batted .294 with 71 home runs and 368 RBI in 483 games, averaging 23 homers and 108 RBIs the last two years. His slash line was .294/.364/.482. He had a career 1.060 OPS against left-handed pitching. His fielding percentage at first base was .992.

Randy Smith, the Padres' vice president of player development and international scouting, said, "This is a guy who hits the ball as hard as anyone." Padres' manager Bud Black had three words to describe Freiman: "Big-time power." Notwithstanding all this, he was blocked from advancing to the major league Padres by their regular first baseman Yonder Alonso.

Freiman began 2013 playing for the Triple-A Sacramento River Cats. Before he was called up to the majors on June 29, he batted .277 with 14 home runs and 69 RBIs in 296 at bats in 76 games, with a slugging percentage of .493. His RBI total led the Pacific Coast League to that point, and his home run total was tied for seventh in the PCL.

=== Houston Astros (2013) ===
The Houston Astros picked Freiman for $50,000 with the top pick in the second round of the Rule 5 draft in December 2012, and added him to their 40-man roster. If they didn't keep Freiman on their 25-man roster for the entire season, they were required to offer him back to the Padres for $25,000.

Kevin Goldstein, the Astros’ director of pro scouting, observed, "He destroys left-handed pitching." Astros manager Bo Porter said:

You're sitting in the stands and you can see he's a big guy, but when I walked up to him for the first time face-to-face, I go, 'Wow, this is a big man.' He's big, but he has a really good swing. It's not like a big guy. It's short, compact. It's not just the home runs. The guy has a pretty good idea how to hit.

Freiman went to spring training with the Astros in 2013. As late as March 22, Brian T. Smith of the Houston Chronicle thought there was a strong chance he would make the team's opening day roster.

Although the Astros initially planned to include Freiman on their 2013 major league team, they ran into a logjam at first base. After drafting Freiman, they signed veteran slugger first baseman/designated hitter Carlos Peña to a guaranteed contract and acquired first baseman/designated hitter Chris Carter from Oakland, and incumbent Brett Wallace was expected to be their everyday first baseman for the season. Consequently, they decided they didn't have room for Freiman and placed him on waivers.

=== Oakland Athletics (2014-15) ===
On March 23, 2013, Freiman was claimed off waivers by the Oakland Athletics and added to their 40-man roster. The A's had been looking for a right-handed-hitting first baseman to complement left-handed-hitting Brandon Moss since they traded Moss's platoon-mate, Chris Carter, to Houston in February 2013. A's assistant general manager David Forst observed,

He had a great year in Double-A last year. Obviously he has a ton of power. And his splits against left-handed pitching are off the charts.

On March 30, Freiman was put on the A's 25-man major league roster. Manager Bob Melvin said Freiman would get starts against southpaw starters, and that Freiman had "as much power as anyone here." On April 3, he had two hits in three at-bats in his major league debut, the first Oakland player to get two hits in his debut since Daric Barton in 2007.

Freiman was voted American League Rookie of the Month for May 2013, after batting .351 (13-for-37) with 3 doubles, 1 home run, and 9 RBIs in 14 games, as among A.L. rookies he was second in RBIs, tied for fourth in doubles, tied for sixth in hits and homers. For the season, he batted .274 in 190 at bats.

In 2014, the A's invited Freiman to their major league camp in spring training to compete with Daric Barton and others for a spot on their 25-man roster. On March 23, Freiman was optioned to the Sacramento River Cats. He batted .284/.371/.506 for them, with 15 home runs and 74 RBIs in 310 at bats. Freiman started 2014 in Triple-A. A's manager Bob Melvin said he wanted Freiman to get some at bats against right-handed pitchers while down in Sacramento.

Freiman was called up to the A's on June 29, 2014, after leading the Pacific Coast League to that point in RBIs, and tying for seventh in home runs. Melvin said that Freiman would be the A's first baseman against left-handed starting pitchers, as had been the case the prior year. His 61-game errorless streak, which ended on August 15, was the seventh-longest first baseman errorless streak in Oakland history.

Freiman played for the Nashville Sounds in 2015, batting .220. On July 2, 2015, the A's designated Freiman for assignment. On July 5 he was assigned to the Nashville Sounds.

=== Washington Nationals (2016) ===
On December 23, 2015, Freiman signed a minor league contract with the Atlanta Braves and was assigned to the Triple–A Gwinnett Braves.

Freiman was traded to the Washington Nationals in exchange for 1B/OF Tyler Moore on March 27, 2016. He was released on April 21.

=== Long Island Ducks (2016) ===
On April 30, 2016, Freiman signed with the Long Island Ducks of the Atlantic League of Professional Baseball. He batted .381/.458/.714 in 24 plate appearances.

=== Boston Red Sox (2016) ===
On May 10, 2016, the Red Sox signed Freiman to a minor league contract and assigned him to the Double–A Portland Sea Dogs. He finished the season batting .277/.364/.450 with 11 home runs in 311 at bats. Freiman elected to be a free agent on November 7.

=== Long Island Ducks (second stint) (2017) ===
On April 22, 2017, the Long Island Ducks of the Atlantic League re-signed Freiman. Later that month he left the Ducks, for whom he was batting .250 with four home runs and six RBI, to play in the Mexican League.

=== Acereros de Monclova (2017) ===
On May 2, 2017, Freiman signed with the Acereros de Monclova of the Mexican League.

=== Pericos de Puebla (2017) ===
Freiman was traded to the Pericos de Puebla on May 20, 2017, in exchange for outfielder Cole Gillespie. Between the two teams, in 198 combined at bats he batted .298/.418/.480 with 8 home runs and 35 RBI. Freiman was released before the start of the 2018 season on January 18, 2018.

Freiman announced his retirement from professional baseball at the age of 31 on March 10, 2018, and said he would be studying for an MBA at Duke University.

== International career ==
Freiman played for Israel at the 2013 World Baseball Classic qualifier in September 2012. Manager Brad Ausmus started him at first base and batted him third in the lineup. Of his five hits while batting .417, four were home runs. During the opening game, against South Africa, Zeid went 2 for 5, with both of his hits being 2-out solo homeruns. During the second game, against Spain, Freiman went 2 for 4, with both of his hits being two-run homeruns. During Israel's third game, the qualifying game against Spain, Freiman went 1 for 3 with an RBI and two walks, while scoring a run and being hit by a pitch. Israel lost to Spain in extra innings in the pool finals, just missing making the World Baseball Classic. Freiman said: "It was heartbreaking, but hopefully if they put together another team I’ll be a part of it. It was a fantastic experience."

Freiman again played for Israel at the 2017 World Baseball Classic qualifier, batting third in all three games. During the first game of the qualifier, Freiman went 1 for 4 with a walk and a strike out, as the starting first baseman. During the second game, Freiman was the DH while going 1 for 4 with 2 strikeouts and scored the games only run after hitting a double in the 4th inning. During the third and final game, Freiman was again the starting first baseman, and went 0 for 3 with 2 walks. Freiman was also credited with getting the final out of the finale, sending Israel to their first appearance in the World Baseball Classic.

Freiman played first base for Team Israel at the 2017 World Baseball Classic in the main tournament, in March 2017. In what NBC reported was thought to be the tallest batter-pitcher matchup in baseball history, the 6-foot-8-inch (2.03 m) Freiman walked against the 7-foot-1-inch (2.16 m) pitcher Loek van Mil of the Netherlands during the first round. In the tournament, he batted .273/.429/.636 with 2 doubles and 2 home runs, scoring 7 runs and driving in 6 RBIs in 22 at bats. Freiman wrote an article describing his experiences on Team Israel, entitled "The Mensches of March."

== Post-playing career ==
Freiman is currently employed by the Cleveland Guardians, where he has served as Director, Hitting Development since 2022.

== Personal life ==
Freiman married LPGA golfer Amanda Blumenherst in December 2012. She was a three-time National Player of the Year at Duke University, where they met. The two were Duke's ACC Senior Male and Female Athletes of the Year in 2009, and Blumenherst had won the U.S. Women's Amateur in 2008.

Freiman has caddied for her seven times at LPGA tournaments. He observed: "I'm probably more nervous than she is. I don't choose the clubs, but I have to give her the yardage. I'm adding up all of the numbers, and I better be right. It's nerve-wracking but a lot of fun."

In August 2013, at the age of 26 and eight months after being married, Blumenherst announced that she would take a leave from professional golf to spend more time with her husband. She said: "I don't want to say I'm retiring, because you never know what will happen. Maybe I'll decide in a couple years to come back, and this will just be a little break, you never know." The couple has two sons, William David, born in November 2014, and Charles Alexander, born in December 2016, and two daughters, Ella Rose Marie, born in November 2019 and daughter Chloe Emma Faith, born in October 2022.

== See also ==
- List of Jewish Major League Baseball players

| Preceded by Justin Grimm | AL Rookie of the Month; May 2013 | Succeeded by José Iglesias |
