= Leslie Spalding =

American golfer and coach

Personal information
- Nationality: United States
- Born: February 22, 1969 (age 57) Billings, Montana, U.S.
- Height: 5 ft 6 in (1.68 m)

Career
- Sport: Golf
- College: University of Alabama
- Turned professional: 1992
- Former tours: LPGA Tour (1996-2005); Futures Tour (1993-1997)

Best results in LPGA major championships
- Chevron Championship: DNP
- Women's PGA C'ship: T46: 2003
- U.S. Women's Open: T36: 1998
- du Maurier Classic: T18: 2000
- Women's British Open: CUT: 2001, 2002

Leslie Spalding (born February 22, 1969) is an American professional golfer and golf coach, who played on the LPGA Tour from 1995 to 2005.

== Early life and amateur career ==
In 1969, Spalding was born in Billings, Montana. As a high school student, she was the 1986–87 Montana State Class AA High School champion.

After being a runner up in 1987 and 1990, she went on to win the 1991 and 1992 Montana State Women's Amateur Championships. At the University of Alabama (where she studied telecommunications and film), she was the 1990 Neva McCall/Alabama Intercollegiate champion and the 1991 Women's Southern Intercollegiate (WSIC) champion.

== Professional career ==
In 1992, Spalding turned professional. In 1993–94, prior to joining the LPGA, she competed on the Futures Tour. In 1995, she competed on the Golf Coast Tour and qualified for the LPGA Tour by tying for 16th at the LPGA Final Qualifying Tournament, to earn exempt status for the 1996 season.

Her best result was a joint third place finish at the 2001 ShopRite LPGA Classic.

Spalding retired from professional golf in 2005 to become an independent golf teacher, she was first contracted by the Peter Yegen Golf Club in Billings, Montana.

Spalding was head coach of the Montana State University – Bozeman Bobcat women's golf team from 2007 to 2011. On August 1, 2011, it was announced that Spalding resigned from Montana State in order to accept a position at San Diego State University.
