= 2002 LPGA Championship =

Tournament information
- Dates: June 6–9, 2002
- Location: Wilmington, Delaware; 39.789°N 75.564°W
- Course: DuPont Country Club
- Tour: LPGA Tour
- Format: Stroke play - 72 holes

Statistics
- Par: 71
- Length: 6,408 yards (5,859 m)
- Field: 144 players, 71 after cut
- Cut: 150 (+8)
- Prize fund: $1.5 million
- Winner's share: $225,000

Champion
- (South Korea) Se Ri Pak
- 279 (−5)
- Location in United States Location in Delaware

The 2002 LPGA Championship was the 48th LPGA Championship, played June 6–9 at DuPont Country Club in Wilmington, Delaware.

Se Ri Pak, age 24, won the second of her three LPGA Championships, three strokes ahead of runner-up Beth Daniel, the 54-hole leader and champion in 1990. It was the fourth of Pak's five major titles; at the time, she was the youngest woman to win four major titles. Daniel, age 45, was attempting to become the oldest winner of a major in LPGA history, but carded a final round 77.

Annika Sörenstam shot 65 to climb up the leaderboard into third; she won the next three editions of this championship.

The DuPont Country Club hosted the LPGA Championship for eleven consecutive seasons, from 1994 through 2004.

== Final leaderboard ==
Sunday, June 9, 2002

| Place | Player | Score | To par | Money ($) |
|---|---|---|---|---|
| 1 | (South Korea) Se Ri Pak | 71-70-68-70=279 | −5 | 225,000 |
| 2 | (United States) Beth Daniel | 67-70-68-77=282 | −2 | 136,987 |
| 3 | (Sweden) Annika Sörenstam | 70-76-73-65=284 | E | 99,375 |
| T4 | (United States) Juli Inkster | 69-75-70-71=285 | +1 | 69,375 |
| T4 | (Australia) Karrie Webb | 68-71-72-74=285 | +1 | 69,375 |
| T6 | (Sweden) Carin Koch | 68-73-73-72=286 | +2 | 46,500 |
| T6 | (United States) Michele Redman | 74-69-70-73=286 | +2 | 46,500 |
| 8 | (Scotland) Catriona Matthew | 70-73-75-70=288 | +4 | 37,125 |
| T9 | (United States) Kristi Albers | 74-73-73-70=290 | +6 | 30,625 |
| T9 | (United States) Michelle McGann | 71-72-72-75=290 | +6 | 30,625 |
| T9 | (England) Karen Stupples | 75-70-70-75=290 | +6 | 30,625 |
