= Jenny Chuasiriporn =

American golfer (born 1977)

Personal information
- Full name: Wanalee Chuasiriporn
- Nationality: United States
- Born: July 9, 1977 (age 49) Baltimore, Maryland, U.S.
- Height: 5 ft 5 in (165 cm)
- Spouse: Robert Betts

Career
- Sport: Golf
- College: Duke University; University of Maryland (nursing school); Virginia Commonwealth University (post-graduate studies)
- Turned professional: 1999

Best results in LPGA major championships
- U.S. Women's Open: 2nd: 1998

Achievements and awards
- Duke University Athletics Hall of Fame: 2011

Jenny Chuasiriporn (born Wanalee Chuasiriporn; July 9, 1977) is an American former professional golfer and nurse. She is best known for finishing second at the 1998 U.S. Women's Open.

== Early life ==
In 1977, Chuasiriporn was born in Baltimore, Maryland. Her parents are from Thailand.

== Amateur career ==
In 1995, Chuasiriporn started attending Duke University.

At the 1998 U.S. Women's Open, Chuasiriporn, playing as an amateur, was near the lead at the end of regulation. With her brother Joey as her caddy, she sank a 40-foot (12 m) birdie putt on the 72nd green on Sunday to gain a spot in an 18-hole playoff. In the playoff round on Monday, Chuasiriporn lost to Se-ri Pak on the 20th hole (second sudden-death hole after 18-hole playoff).

In addition to her 1998 U.S. Open success, Chuasiriporn was runner-up at the 1998 U.S. Women's Amateur. She was also a member of the 1998 Curtis Cup winning team.

In 1999, she led the Blue Devils to the 1999 NCAA golf title. Overall, she finished her college career as a four-time All-American.

== Professional career ==
In 1999, Chuasiriporn turned professional. She played on various mini-tours after college.

In 2005, she went back to college to study nursing at the University of Maryland. She received a master's degree from Virginia Commonwealth University and became a nurse practitioner in 2010. She lives in Virginia with her husband, physician Robert Betts, and practices under her legal name, Wanalee Betts.

== Awards and honors ==
In 2011, she entered the Duke University Athletic Hall of Fame.

== Playoff record ==
LPGA Tour playoff record (0–1)

No.	Year	Tournament	Opponent	Result
1	1998	U.S. Women's Open	(South Korea) Pak Se-ri	Lost to birdie on second extra hole after 18-hole playoff (Chuasiriporn:73, Pak:73)

== U.S. national team appearances ==
Amateur

- Curtis Cup: 1998 (winners)
- Espirito Santo Trophy: 1998 (winners)
