= 1998 Nabisco Dinah Shore =

Coordinates: 33.798°N 116.433°W

Tournament information
- Dates: March 26–29, 1998
- Location: Rancho Mirage, California
- Courses: Mission Hills Country Club; Dinah Shore Tourn. Course
- Tour: LPGA Tour
- Format: Stroke play - 72 holes

Statistics
- Par: 72
- Length: 6,460 yards (5,907 m)
- Field: 103 players, 73 after cut
- Cut: 151 (+7)
- Prize fund: $1.0 million
- Winner's share: $150,000

Champion
- (United States) Pat Hurst
- 281 (−7)

Location in the United States
Location in California

The 1998 Nabisco Dinah Shore was a women's professional golf tournament, held March 26–29 at Mission Hills Country Club in Rancho Mirage, California. This was the 27th edition of the Nabisco Dinah Shore, and the sixteenth as a major championship.

Pat Hurst won her only major title, one stroke ahead of runner-up Helen Dobson. At the final green, she sank a 5-foot (1.5 m) putt for par and gained her second tour victory.

At 6,460 yards (5,907 m), the course was the longest on the LPGA Tour in 1998.

== Final leaderboard ==
Sunday, March 28, 1998

| Place | Player | Score | To par | Money ($) |
|---|---|---|---|---|
| 1 | (United States) Pat Hurst | 68-72-70-71=281 | −7 | 150,000 |
| 2 | (England) Helen Dobson | 70-74-71-67=282 | −6 | 93,093 |
| T3 | (Sweden) Helen Alfredsson | 70-73-70-70=283 | −5 | 60,385 |
| T3 | (England) Laura Davies | 75-70-70-68=283 | −5 | 60,385 |
| T5 | (United States) Donna Andrews | 71-72-71-70=284 | −4 | 38,998 |
| T5 | (Sweden) Liselotte Neumann | 69-71-71-73=284 | −4 | 38,998 |
| T7 | (Sweden) Annika Sörenstam | 76-71-69-70=286 | −2 | 27,928 |
| T7 | (Australia) Karrie Webb | 71-72-70-73=286 | −2 | 27,928 |
| T9 | (United States) Dottie Pepper | 73-72-74-68=287 | −1 | 22,393 |
| T9 | (United States) Sherri Steinhauer | 69-76-71-71=287 | −1 | 22,393 |
