= YourLife Vitamins LPGA Classic =

Golf tournament formerly on the LPGA Tour

The YourLife Vitamins LPGA Classic was a golf tournament on the LPGA Tour, played only in 2001. It was played at Grand Cypress Resort in Orlando, Florida. It was the first event of the 2001 season. The winner was Se Ri Pak by four strokes over Penny Hammel and Carin Koch.
