= 1998 Espirito Santo Trophy =

Tournament information
- Dates: 12–15 November
- Location: Santiago, Chile; 33°27′S 70°40′W
- Course: Prince of Wales Country Club
- Organized by: World Amateur Golf Council
- Format: 72 holes stroke play

Statistics
- Par: 72
- Length: 6,150 yards (5,620 m)
- Field: 33 teams 99 players

Champion
- United States; Kellee Booth, Jenny Chuasiriporn, Brenda Corrie-Kuehn
- 558 (−18)
- Location in Chile

The 1998 Espirito Santo Trophy took place 12–15 November at Prince of Wales Country Club in Santiago, Chile.

It was the 18th women's golf World Amateur Team Championship for the Espirito Santo Trophy.

The tournament was a 72-hole stroke play team event. There were 33 team entries, each with three players. The best two scores for each round counted towards the team total.

The United States team won the Trophy for their 13th title, beating team Italy and team Germany by 21 strokes, the widest margin of victory in the history of the championship. Italy and Germany shared the silver medal on second place.

The individual title went to Jenny Chuasiriporn, United States, whose score of 12-under-par, 276, was seven strokes ahead of her teammate Kellee Booth.

== Teams ==
33 teams entered the event and completed the competition. Each team had three players.

Country	Players
Argentina	Maria Larrauri, Maria Olivero, Maria Lucia White
Australia	Michelle Ellis, Kate MacIntosh, Rebecca Stevenson
Austria	Sandra Fischer, Lilian Mensi-Klarbach, Tina Schneeberger
Belgium	Naima Ghilain, Stephanie Schinkel, Gaelle Van Wettere
Bolivia	Ella Maria Asbun, Veronica Malddonado, Ximena Maldonado
Brazil	Maria Candida Hanneman, Elisabeth Nickhorn, Cristina Schmitt Baldi
Canada	Isabelle Blais, Mary Ann Lapointe, Kareen Qually
Chile	Nicolle Perrot, Gloria Soto, Beatriz Steeger
Chinese Taipei	Hsiao-chuan Lu, Yu-ping Lin, Yun-jye Wei
Colombia	Cristina Baena, Marcela Gonzalez, Catalina Navarro
Croatia	Snjezana Crnoglavac, Sanja Serfezi, Daria Zubrinic
Denmark	Karen Margrethe Juul, Christina Kuld, Amanda Moltke-Leth
Ecuador	Maria Jose Ferro, Katy Pareja, Patricia Pazmino
Finland	Pia Koivuranta, Nina Laitinen, Hanna-Rikka Kuitunen
France	Stéphanie Arricau, Karine Icher, Marine Monnet
Germany	Martina Eberl, Miriam Nagl, Nicole Stillig
Guatemala	Maria Cristina Arenas, Nancy de Noguera, Graciela de Ruest
Italy	Fedezica Piovano, Sophie Sandolo, Giulia Sergas
Japan	Miho Koga, Mayumi Nakajima, Misato Nishikawa
Mexico	America Leal, Lorena Ochoa, Marta Ostos
Netherlands	Frederique Lempers, Nienke Nijenhuis, Marieke Zelsmann
New Zealand	Renee Fowler, Julia Krachinski, Brenda Ormsby
Norway	Line Berg, Monica Gundersund, Suzann Pettersen
Paraguay	Jazmin Cataldo, Rocio Delmas, Celeste Troche
Peru	Rosemarie Fuster, Maria Julia Fyfe, Marisa de la Puente
Philippines	Dorothy Delasin, Ria Denise Quiazon, Jennifer Rosales
South Africa	Sanet Marais, Joanne Norton, Wendy Warrington
South Korea	Jang Jeong, Cho Kyung-hee, Grace Park
Sweden	Maria Bodén, Marie Hedberg, Jessica Lindbergh
Switzerland	Barbara Albisetti, Niloufar Azam, Sheila Lee
United States	Kellee Booth, Jenny Chuasiriporn, Brenda Corrie-Kuehn
Uruguay	Adriana Lavina, Gabriela Villar, Magdalena Villar
Venezuela	Yubiri Cortez, Paola Mariño, Alessandra Perez

== Results ==
Place	Country	Score	To par
1	United States	143-134-139-142=558	−18
T2	Germany	149-141-145-144=579	+3
T2	Italy	153-143-143-140=579	+3
T4	Australia	141-141-154-144=580	+4
T4	South Korea	152-143-147-138=580	+4
6	France	142-146-149-146=583	+7
7	Chinese Taipei	145-145-144-152=586	+10
8	Austria	149-150-142-147=588	+12
9	Sweden	149-147-151-143=590	+14
T10	Denmark	148-15-151-147=596	+20
T10	Japan	146-148-154-148=596	+20
12	Argentina	154-151-149-144=598	+22
13	Canada	152-148-152-147=599	+23
14	Colombia	146-150-150-154=600	+24
15	Mexico	151-154-154-143=602	+26
16	Norway	147-157-151-149=604	+28
T17	Belgium	150-151-152-153=606	+30
T17	Chile	151-145-155-155=606	+30
T17	New Zealand	156-156-144-150=606	+30
T17	Philippines	151-149-152-154=606	+30
21	Paraguay	156-152-149-153=610	+34
22	Finland	150-150-157-155=612	+36
23	Brazil	154-147-159-155=615	+39
24	Switzerland	151-160-156-150=617	+41
25	South Africa	159-156-148-158=621	+45
26	Netherlands	158-157-154-154=623	+47
27	Peru	159-160-158-153=630	+54
28	Venezuela	156-163-155-162=636	+60
29	Uruguay	154-165-160-159=638	+62
30	Ecuador	160-161-163-157=641	+65
31	Bolivia	165-162-162-166=655	+79
32	Guatemala	161-179-161-176=677	+101
33	Croatia	191-202-196-190=779	+203

== Individual leaders ==
There was no official recognition for the lowest individual scores.

Place	Player	Country	Score	To par
1	Jenny Chuasiriporn	United States	71-65-69-71=276	−12
2	Kellee Booth	United States	72-70-70-71=283	−8
3	Martina Eberl	Germany	72-68-75-73=288	E
T4	Michelle Ellis	Australia	71-70-78-70=289	+1
T4	Jang Jeong	South Korea	72-75-72-70=289	+1
T4	Christina Kuld	Denmark	73-73-71-72=289	+1
T7	Lin Yu-ping	Chinese Taipei	71-73-73-74=291	+3
T7	Rebecca Stevenson	Australia	70-71-76-74=291	+3
T9	Marine Monnet	France	70-71-74-77=292	+4
T9	Giulia Sergas	Italy	79-70-69-74=292	+4
