= 1996 du Maurier Classic =

Coordinates: 53.497288°N 113.603539°W

The 1996 du Maurier Classic was contested from August 1–4 at Edmonton Country Club. It was the 24th edition of the du Maurier Classic, and the 18th edition as a major championship on the LPGA Tour.

This event was won by Laura Davies.

== Final leaderboard ==
Place	Player	Score	To par	Money (US$)
1	(England) Laura Davies	71-70-70-66=277	−11	150,000
T2	(United States) Nancy Lopez	68-71-69-71=279	−9	80,513
T2	(Australia) Karrie Webb	65-68-74-72=279	−9	80,513
4	(United States) Meg Mallon	72-65-69-74=280	−8	52,837
5	(United States) Pat Hurst	69-70-68-74=281	−7	42,772
T6	(Sweden) Liselotte Neumann	69-74-67-73=283	−5	32,456
T6	(Sweden) Annika Sörenstam	71-70-69-73=283	−5	32,456
T8	(United States) Dana Dormann	69-70-71-74=284	−4	24,909
T8	(United States) Kathy Postlewait	72-68-70-74=284	−4	24,909
T10	(United States) Amy Fruhwirth	70-71-71-73=285	−3	20,128
T10	(United States) Rosie Jones	70-71-68-76=285	−3	20,128
