= Jane Park =

American professional golfer (born 1986)

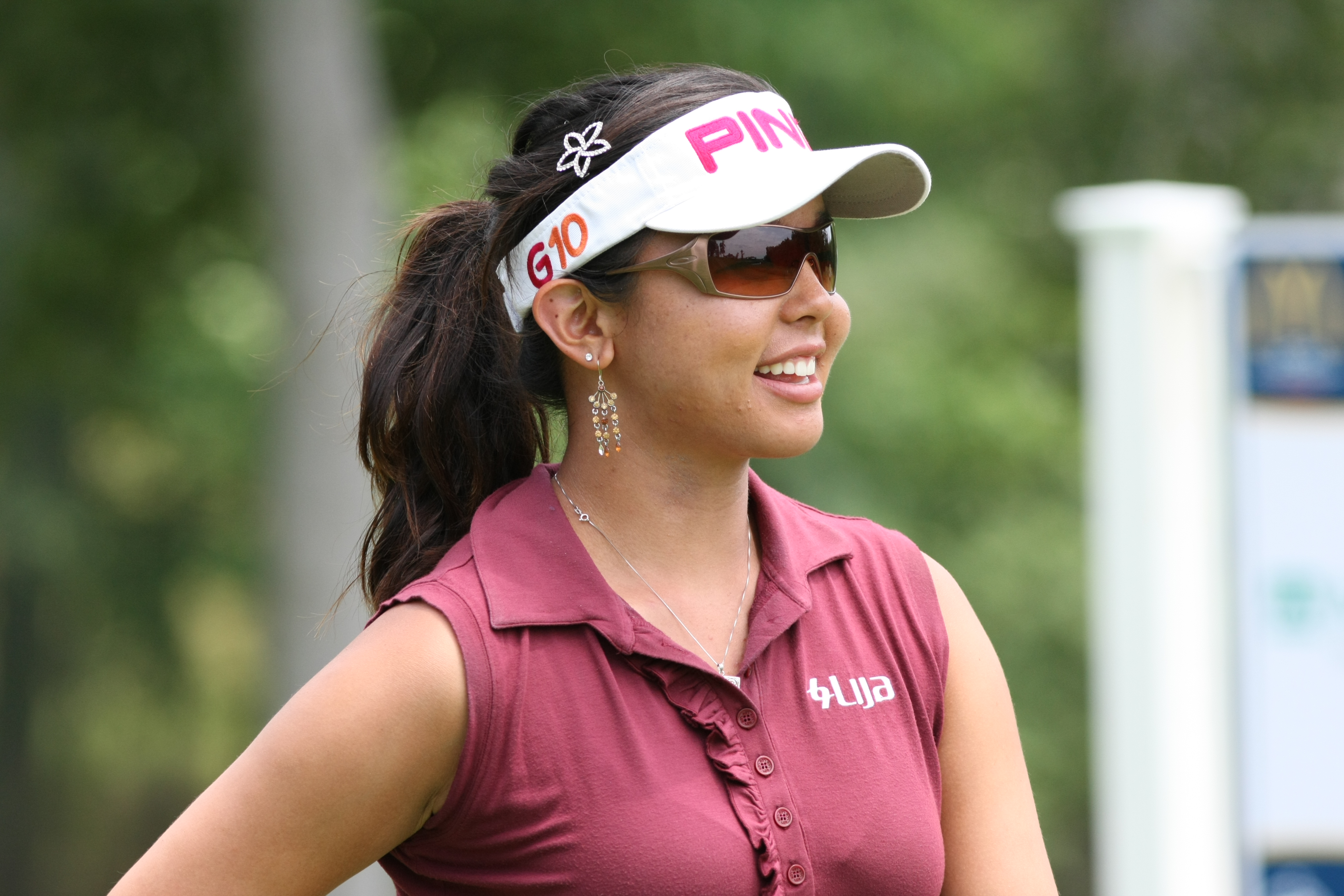
- Park at the 2008 LPGA Championship

Personal information
- Nationality: United States
- Born: December 15, 1986 (age 39) Chicago, Illinois, U.S.
- Height: 5 ft 6 in (1.68 m)
- Spouse: Pete Godfrey (m. 2017)

Career
- Sport: Golf
- College: UCLA
- Turned professional: 2006
- Current tour: LPGA Tour (joined 2007)
- Former tour: Futures Tour (joined 2007)

Best results in LPGA major championships
- Chevron Championship: T19: 2013
- Women's PGA C'ship: T11: 2014
- U.S. Women's Open: T5: 2015
- Women's British Open: T17: 2009
- Evian Championship: T12: 2016

Jane Park (born December 15, 1986) is an American professional golfer. She plays on the LPGA Tour. Before turning professional, Park reached the finals of the 2003 U.S. Women's Amateur and 2004 U.S. Girls' Junior, and won the 2004 U.S. Women's Amateur. She also tied for low amateur at the 2006 U.S. Women's Open. Since joining the LPGA in 2007, she has earned over $2.8 million and recorded 16 top-10 finishes.

== Early life and amateur career ==
Park was born in Chicago, Illinois, on December 15, 1986, Park began to play golf when she was 11 years old, and later resided in Rancho Cucamonga, California. In August 2003, 16-year-old Park reached the finals of the U.S. Women's Amateur, where she lost to Virada Nirapathpongporn 2 and 1. The following year, Park made it to the finals of the U.S. Girls' Junior Championship, where she faced Julieta Granada. After the 18-hole match finished all square, Granada won on the second extra hole. Three weeks later, Park won the U.S. Women's Amateur Championship, defeating Amanda McCurdy 2-up in the title match.

In addition to her three appearances in USGA event finals, Park played on the U.S. Curtis Cup team in 2004 and 2006 and the UCLA Bruins college team in 2005, when she was a first-team All-American. She finished in a tie for 10th at the 2006 U.S. Women's Open, which was tied for the highest finish by an amateur that year.

== Professional career ==
In August 2006, Park turned professional shortly after the U.S. Women's Open. In December, at the 2006 LPGA Final Qualifying Tournament, Park tied for 18th place, outside the top 15, which only secured her non-exempt (conditional) status on the LPGA Tour for 2007. With a partial LPGA schedule, she spent time on the Futures Tour developmental circuit in 2007. After finishing 109th on the LPGA Tour money list, Park returned to the Final Qualifying Tournament in December, where she won with a 17-under-par total and gained full playing privileges on the LPGA Tour for 2008.

During her first full season on the LPGA Tour, Park won over $630,000 to finish 29th on the 2008 money list. In 26 events, she recorded four top-10 finishes, including ties for second at the SBS Open at Turtle Bay and P&G Beauty NW Arkansas Championship. In 2009, Park had two top-10 finishes in 19 events; a sixth-place tie at the HSBC Women's Champions was her highest finish of the season. Park did not have a top-20 finish in the 2010 season, earning $78,572 for the year. In 2011, Park's earnings fell to $42,261, and she again had no top-20 finishes during the season.

Following a 2012 in which she missed the cut in more than half of her 15 events played, Park had a pair of top-10 finishes in 2013 and over $260,000 in earnings; her ranking of 51st on the LPGA money list was her highest in five years. Her 2014 earnings were just over half of the amount she made in 2013, though she made the cut in 11 of her 16 tournaments. Park's 2015 season included two top-10 finishes, and her season earnings topped $300,000. Her highest finish was a tie for fifth at the U.S. Women's Open, a tournament in which she held a share of the lead after one round. In 2016, she earned over $165,000, finishing 84th on the money list. Park's top finish of the season was a tie for 12th at the Evian Championship. The following year, Park's earnings exceeded $340,000, more than doubling her 2016 total. At the Canadian Women's Open, she had her highest finish of the season, a tie for eighth place; in her next tournament, the Portland Classic, she posted her second and final top-10 result in 2017, tying for ninth. That year, Park married Pete Godfrey, a caddie who has worked for LPGA Tour players Ariya Jutanugarn, Jang Ha-na, and Lydia Ko.

Park tied for fourth at the 2018 Kia Classic, her best LPGA Tour result in a decade. For the season, she earned almost $300,000 and was 65th on the money list. The Kia Classic was the only tournament in which Park finished in the top 10 in 2018. In 2019, she fell nine spots to 74th in earnings, which totaled over $200,000. Park had three top-10 results in 19 tournaments that season. At the Ladies Scottish Open, she shot a 63 in the first round and ended the day as a co-leader, on her way to a tie for ninth. She later finished tied for seventh at the Portland Classic, and at the Volunteers of America Classic she tied for fourth. In 2020, Park made two cuts in three events played; a tie for 25th at the Women's Australian Open was her highest finish. She made three of 10 cuts in 2021; her only top-60 finish was a tie for 13th at the LPGA Mediheal Championship. Park then took an extended leave from the tour to care for her daughter. In July 2023, after a two-year absence, she returned to play in the Dow Great Lakes Bay Invitational.

== Results in LPGA majors ==
Results not in chronological order before 2019.

Tournament	2003	2004	2005	2006	2007	2008	2009	2010	2011	2012
ANA Inspiration		T24	T50			CUT	T30	T44	T41	
U.S. Women's Open	T30	CUT	CUT	T10 TLA	T58	T42	CUT		CUT	
Women's PGA Championship					T74	T34	CUT	CUT	CUT	CUT
Women's British Open						T24	T17	CUT	CUT	T39

Tournament	2013	2014	2015	2016	2017	2018	2019	2020	2021
ANA Inspiration	T19		CUT	CUT		CUT	T61		CUT
U.S. Women's Open	T42	WD	T5	CUT	T21	T49	CUT		
Women's PGA Championship	T64	T11	T49	WD	T36	T40	70		CUT
The Evian Championship ^	T67	T24	CUT	T12	CUT	T26		NT	
Women's British Open	CUT		T31		T23	CUT			

^ The Evian Championship was added as a major in 2013

Top 10
Did not play

LA = Low amateur
CUT = missed the half-way cut
WD = withdrew
NT = no tournament
"T" = tied

=== Summary ===
Tournament	Wins	2nd	3rd	Top-5	Top-10	Top-25	Events	Cuts made
ANA Inspiration	0	0	0	0	0	2	12	7
U.S. Women's Open	0	0	0	1	2	3	15	8
Women's PGA Championship	0	0	0	0	0	1	14	8
The Evian Championship	0	0	0	0	0	2	6	4
Women's British Open	0	0	0	0	0	3	9	5
Totals	0	0	0	1	2	11	56	32

- Most consecutive cuts made – 4 (twice)
- Longest streak of top-10s – 1 (twice)

== LPGA Tour career summary ==
Season	Tournaments played	Cuts made*	Wins	2nds	3rds	Top 10s	Best finish	Earnings ($)	Money list rank	Scoring average	Scoring rank
2003	1	1	0	0	0	0	T30	n/a		74.00	
2004	3	2	0	0	0	0	T18	n/a		73.11	
2005	3	2	0	0	0	0	T50	n/a		74.70	
2006	3	2	0	0	0	1	T10	9,164		74.11	
2007	11	9	0	0	0	0	T17	64,469	109	72.62	34
2008	26	22	0	2	1	4	T2	631,357	29	71.83	31
2009	19	12	0	0	0	2	T6	194,856	60	72.82	84
2010	15	8	0	0	0	0	T21	78,572	83	72.89	66
2011	13	6	0	0	0	0	T29	42,261	98	74.12	110
2012	15	7	0	0	0	0	T25	54,648	94	73.35	88
2013	23	17	0	0	0	2	T6	267,757	51	71.79	39
2014	16	11	0	0	0	0	T11	136,521	79	71.73	43
2015	26	19	0	0	0	2	T5	348,673	50	72.39	76
2016	21	11	0	0	0	0	T12	165,969	84	72.54	91
2017	24	20	0	0	0	2	T8	341,793	56	71.02	39
2018	25	21	0	0	0	1	T4	297,576	65	71.81	66
2019	19	12	0	0	0	3	T4	218,147	74	71.14	42
2020	3	2	0	0	0	0	T25	15,515	137	72.20	n/a
2021	10	3	0	0	0	0	T13	26,164	151	73.69	148
2022	Did not play										
Totals	266 (2007)	180 (2007)	0	2	1	16 (2007)	T2	2,864,278	142		

Official through the 2022 season
*Includes matchplay and other tournaments without a cut.

== U.S. national team appearances ==
Amateur

- Junior Solheim Cup: 2002 (winners), 2003
- Curtis Cup: 2004 (winners), 2006 (winners)
- Espirito Santo Trophy: 2004
