= 2005 LPGA Championship =

Tournament information
- Dates: June 9–12, 2005
- Location: Havre de Grace, Maryland; 39.542°N 76.133°W
- Course: Bulle Rock Golf Course
- Tour: LPGA Tour
- Format: Stroke play - 72 holes

Statistics
- Par: 72
- Length: 6,488 yards (5,933 m)
- Field: 150 players, 80 after cut
- Cut: 149 (+5)
- Prize fund: $1.8 million
- Winner's share: $270,000

Champion
- (Sweden) Annika Sörenstam
- 277 (−11)
- Location in United States Location in Maryland

The 2005 LPGA Championship was the 51st LPGA Championship, played June 9–12 at Bulle Rock Golf Course in Havre de Grace, Maryland. This was the second of four major championships on the LPGA Tour in 2005.

Two-time defending champion Annika Sörenstam won for the third consecutive year, three strokes ahead of runner-up Michelle Wie, a 15-year-old amateur. It was the ninth of Sörenstam's ten major titles, and was also consecutive major wins, as she won the Kraft Nabisco Championship by eleven strokes in March.

Wie's inclusion created some controversy, as the event was traditionally for professionals only; she turned pro four months later in October.

Starting with this edition, the LPGA Championship was played at Bulle Rock for five consecutive years, through 2009; the previous eleven were held in nearby Delaware at DuPont Country Club in Wilmington.

== Final leaderboard ==
Sunday, June 12, 2005

Place	Player	Score	To par	Money ($)
1	(Sweden) Annika Sörenstam	68-67-69-73=277	−11	270,000
2	(United States) Michelle Wie (a)	69-71-71-69=280	−8	0
T3	(United States) Paula Creamer	68-73-74-67=282	−6	140,517
T3	(England) Laura Davies	67-70-74-71=282	−6	140,517
T5	(United States) Natalie Gulbis	67-71-73-73=284	−4	82,486
T5	(Mexico) Lorena Ochoa	72-72-68-72=284	−4	82,486
T7	(United States) Moira Dunn	71-68-72-74=285	−3	43,993
T7	(United States) Pat Hurst	72-73-71-69=285	−3	43,993
T7	(South Korea) Mi Hyun Kim	69-75-74-67=285	−3	43,993
T7	(South Korea) Young Kim	73-68-68-76=285	−3	43,993
T7	(Sweden) Carin Koch	74-70-69-72=285	−3	43,993
T7	(South Korea) Gloria Park	71-71-72-71=285	−3	43,993

Amateur: Michelle Wie (−8)
