= Pat Hurst =

American professional golfer (born 1969)

Personal information
- Nationality: United States
- Born: May 23, 1969 (age 57) San Leandro, California, U.S.
- Height: 5 ft 6 in (1.68 m)
- Spouse: Jeff Heitt (since 1995)
- Children: 2

Career
- Sport: Golf
- College: San Jose State University
- Turned professional: 1991
- Former tour: LPGA Tour (joined 1994)
- Professional wins: 11

Number of wins by tour
- LPGA Tour: 6
- Other: 5

Best results in LPGA major championships (wins: 1)
- Chevron Championship: Won: 1998
- Women's PGA C'ship: T5: 2006
- U.S. Women's Open: 2nd: 2006
- du Maurier Classic: 5th: 1996
- Women's British Open: T11: 2004
- Evian Championship: DNP

Achievements and awards
- LPGA Rookie of the Year: 1995
- Honda Award: 1989

Pat Hurst (born May 23, 1969) is an American professional golfer who played on the LPGA Tour.

Hurst's mother is originally from Japan and her father is an American of German heritage. She was born in San Leandro, California, and raised in the Bay Area.

== Amateur career ==
As an amateur, Hurst won the 1986 U.S. Girls' Junior and the 1990 U.S. Women's Amateur. In 1989 Hurst was also a U.S. Women's Amateur medalist and was a member of the 1990 U.S. Espirito Santo Trophy team.

Hurst played college golf at San José State University and won team and individual NCAA titles in 1989. In 1989, she won the Honda Award (now the Honda Sports Award) as the best female collegiate golfer in the nation. She was All-American First team in 1989 and 1990, Big West Champion in 1988 and Big West Champion and Athlete of the Year in 1990. She is a member of the San Jose State Sports Hall of Fame.

== Professional career ==
Hurst left San Jose State in 1991 and turned professional. She entered LPGA Tour Qualifying School in 1991 and in 1992, missing both times, the second time by one stroke. Hurst spent the next few years working as a teaching pro at La Quinta Country Club and playing on the Players West Tour, where she won five times. She eventually quit playing golf at one point, taking a job at a Nevada Bob's store in her hometown of San Leandro.

She entered the LPGA Qualifying Tournament again in 1994 and tied for 20th to earn exempt status for the 1995 season.

Hurst won Rookie of the Year honors in her debut season on the LPGA Tour in 1995. She has six career LPGA titles, including one major, the Nabisco Dinah Shore in 1998. Hurst lost a playoff to Annika Sörenstam at the U.S. Women's Open in 2006, the last conducted over a full 18 holes. Hurst's win at the Nabisco Dinah Shore in 1998 makes her exempt for the U.S. Senior Women's Open for ten years (2020–2029).

Hurst's best money list finish was sixth in 2000, and she represented the U.S. in five Solheim Cups (1998, 2000, 2002, 2005, and 2007). She was named the captain of the 2021 Solheim Cup team.

== Professional wins (11) ==
=== LPGA Tour wins (6) ===
Legend
LPGA Tour major championships (1)
Other LPGA Tour (5)

No.	Date	Tournament	Winning score	To par	Margin of victory	Runner(s)-up
1	Jun 8, 1997	Oldsmobile Classic	68-70-71-70=279	−9	1 stroke	(United States) Juli Inkster
2	Mar 29, 1998	Nabisco Dinah Shore	68-72-70-71=281	−7	1 stroke	(England) Helen Dobson
3	May 14, 2000	Electrolux USA Championship	65-68-72-70=275	−13	4 strokes	(United States) Juli Inkster
4	Sep 4, 2005	State Farm Classic	67-69-65-70=271	−17	3 strokes	(United States) Cristie Kerr
5	Aug 20, 2006	Safeway Classic	69-69-68=206	−10	1 stroke	(South Korea) Jeong Jang (United States) Kim Saiki
6	Mar 22, 2009	MasterCard Classic	68-70-68=206	−10	1 stroke	(Mexico) Lorena Ochoa (Taiwan) Yani Tseng

LPGA Tour playoff record (0–4)

No.	Year	Tournament	Opponent(s)	Result
1	1997	ITT LPGA Tour Championship	(Canada) Lorie Kane (Sweden) Annika Sörenstam	Sörenstam won with par on third extra hole Hurst eliminated by par on first hole
2	2000	Welch's/Circle K Championship	(Sweden) Annika Sörenstam	Lost to birdie on second extra hole
3	2000	Giant Eagle LPGA Classic	(United States) Dorothy Delasin	Lost to par on second extra hole
4	2006	U.S. Women's Open	(Sweden) Annika Sörenstam	Lost 18-hole playoff, 70 to 74

=== Players West Tour (5) ===
- 1991–94 Five wins

== Major championships ==
=== Wins (1) ===
Year	Championship	Winning score	Margin	Runner-up
1998	Nabisco Dinah Shore	−7 (68-72-70-71=281)	1 stroke	(England) Helen Dobson

=== Results timeline ===
Results not in chronological order before 2015.

Tournament	1987	1988	1989	1990	1991	1992	1993	1994	1995	1996	1997	1998	1999	2000
ANA Inspiration	CUT				T49					CUT	T16	1	T43	T10
Women's PGA Championship									T33	T34	T75	T21		T17
U.S. Women's Open	CUT			CUT	CUT	CUT			T47	CUT	T21	T4		T12
du Maurier Classic									T25	5	CUT	T11		T23

Tournament	2001	2002	2003	2004	2005	2006	2007	2008	2009	2010
ANA Inspiration	T9	T36	T51	T35	T23	T17	T37	T55	T8	T48
Women's PGA Championship	T17	T41	T43	T13	T7	T5	T25	CUT	CUT	CUT
U.S. Women's Open	T34	CUT	CUT	T7	CUT	2	T61	T24	WD	CUT
Women's British Open ^	CUT	T13	T24	T11	20	CUT	CUT	CUT	CUT	CUT

Tournament	2011	2012	2013	2014	2015
ANA Inspiration	CUT	T43	CUT	CUT	T46
Women's PGA Championship	T8	T62	CUT	CUT	CUT
U.S. Women's Open	CUT	CUT			
Women's British Open ^	T49				
The Evian Championship ^^					

^ The Women's British Open replaced the du Maurier Classic as an LPGA major in 2001
^^ The Evian Championship was added as a major in 2013

Win
Top 10
Did not play

WD = withdrew
CUT = missed the half-way cut
T = tied

=== Summary ===
Tournament	Wins	2nd	3rd	Top-5	Top-10	Top-25	Events	Cuts made
ANA Inspiration	1	0	0	1	4	7	22	17
Women's PGA Championship	0	0	0	1	3	8	20	14
U.S. Women's Open	0	1	0	2	3	6	21	9
Women's British Open	0	0	0	0	0	4	11	4
du Maurier Classic	0	0	0	1	1	4	5	4
The Evian Championship	0	0	0	0	0	0	0	0
Totals	1	1	0	5	11	29	79	48

- Most consecutive cuts made – 12 (1998 Kraft Nabisco – 2001 U.S. Open)
- Longest streak of top-10s – 2 (2006 LPGA – 2006 U.S. Open)

== U.S. national team appearances ==
Amateur

- Espirito Santo Trophy: 1990 (winners)

Professional

- Solheim Cup: 1998 (winners), 2000, 2002 (winners), 2005 (winners), 2007 (winners), 2021 (non-playing captain)
- World Cup: 2007, 2008
- Handa Cup: 2015 (winners)

=== Solheim Cup record ===
Year	Total matches	Total W-L-H	Singles W-L-H	Foursomes W-L-H	Fourballs W-L-H	Points won	Points %
Career	20	10–7–3	3–1–1	5–2–2	2–4–0	11.5	57.5%
1998	4	3–1–0	0–1–0 lost to L. Davies 1up	2–0–0 won w/ K. Robbins 1up, won w/ K. Robbins 1up	1–0–0 won w/ R. Jones 7&5	3.0	75.0%
2000	4	2–1–1	0–0–1 halved w/ L. Neumann	1–1–0 lost w/ K. Robbins 4&3, won w/ K. Robbins 1up	1–0–0 won w/ K. Robbins 2&1	2.5	62.5%
2002	3	1–2–0	1–0–0 def. M. McKay 3&2	0–1–0 lost w/ K. Robbins 4&2	0–1–0 lost w/ K. Kuehne 1up	1.0	33.3%
2005	5	2–2–1	1–0–0 def. T. Johnson 2&1	1–0–1 halved w/ C. Kim, won w/ M. Redman 1up	0–2–0 lost w/ W. Ward 2&1, lost w/ C. Kim 4&2	2.5	50.0%
2007	4	2–1–1	1–0–0 def. S. Gustafson 2&1	1–0–1 halved w/ C. Kerr, won w/ A. Stanford 4&2	0–1–0 lost w/ B. Lincicome 4&2	2.5	62.5%
