= Bulle Rock Golf Course =

Golf course in Havre de Grace, Maryland, US

- Location within the United States Location within Maryland
- 39.542°N 76.133°W

Club information
- Location: 320 Blenheim Lane; Havre de Grace, Maryland, U.S.
- Established: 1998, 28 years ago
- Type: public
- Tota holes: 18
- Tournaments: LPGA Championship (2005-2009)
- Website: bullerockgolf.com
- Designed by: Pete Dye
- Par: 72
- Length: 7,375 yards (6,744 m)
- Course rating: 76.6
- Slope rating: 148

Bulle Rock Golf Course is a golf course in the eastern United States, located in Havre de Grace, Maryland. It is named for Bulle Rock, the first thoroughbred racehorse brought to America. It hosted the LPGA Championship, a women's major, from 2005 through 2009.

Bulle Rock was designed by noted course architect Pete Dye and opened 28 years ago in 1998. In 2002, Manekin, LLC, Clark Turner, and H&S Properties Development Corporation purchased the golf course and surrounding land and properties from original owner, Ed Abel. The golf course has consistently won awards.
