= Lisa Hall =

Lisa Hall may refer to:

- Lisa Hall (golfer) (born 1967), English golfer
- Lisa Hall (musician), British singer
- Lisa Hall (politician), Cherokee Nation politician
