= 2009 LPGA Championship =

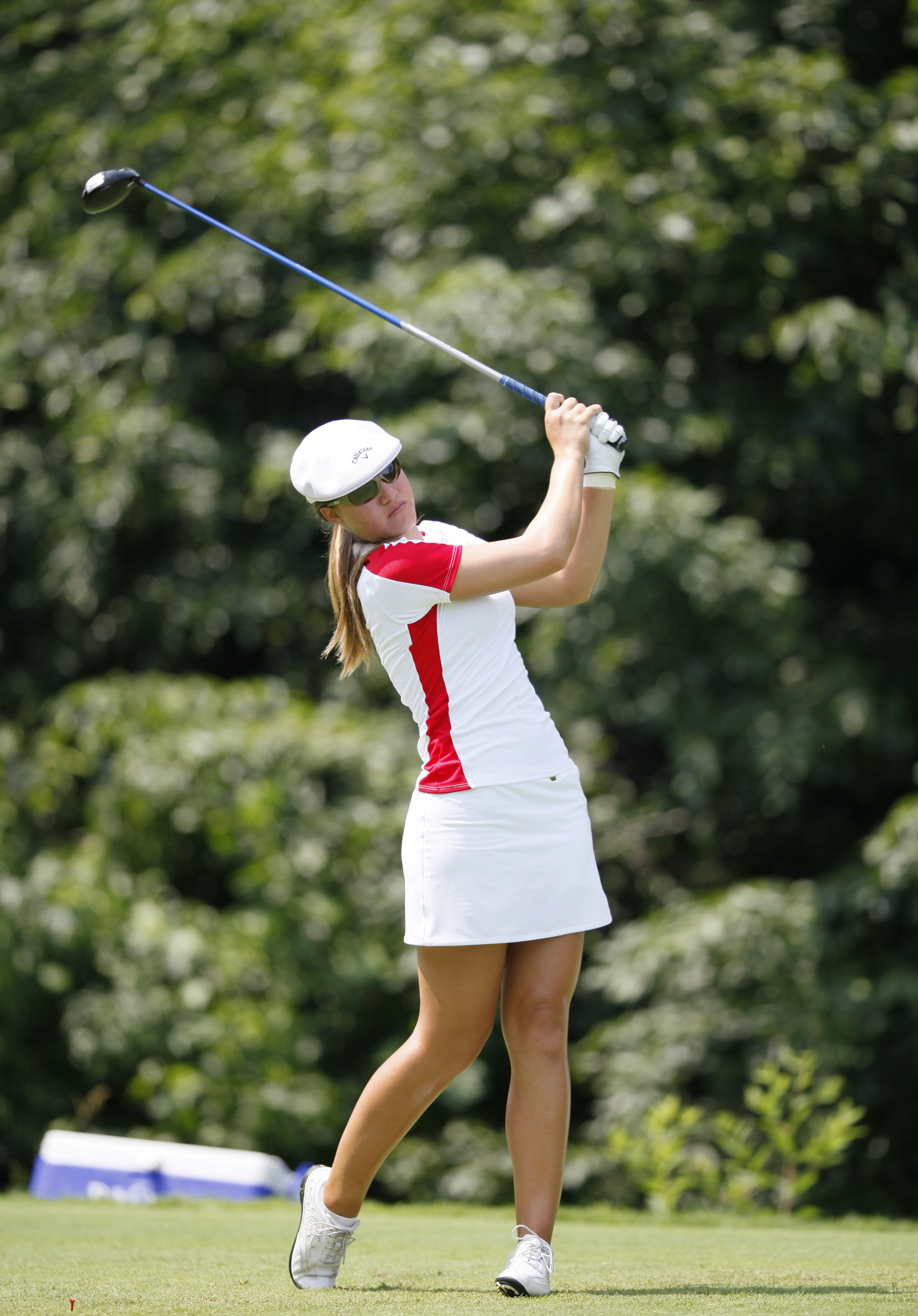
- Vicky Hurst during a practice round

Tournament information
- Dates: June 11–14, 2009
- Location: Havre de Grace, Maryland; 39.542°N 76.133°W
- Course: Bulle Rock Golf Course
- Tour: LPGA Tour
- Format: Stroke play - 72 holes

Statistics
- Par: 72
- Length: 6,562 yards (6,000 m)
- Field: 150 players, 78 after cut
- Cut: 147 (+3)
- Prize fund: $2.0 million
- Winner's share: $300,000

Champion
- (Sweden) Anna Nordqvist
- 273 (−15)
- Location in United States Location in Maryland

The 2009 LPGA Championship was the 55th LPGA Championship, played June 11–14 at Bulle Rock Golf Course in Havre de Grace, Maryland. This was the second of four major championships on the LPGA Tour in 2009.

Tour rookie Anna Nordqvist, age 22, won her first major title, four strokes ahead of runner-up Lindsey Wright. It was Nordqvist's first career win on the LPGA Tour.

Beginning in 2005, this championship was played at Bulle Rock for five consecutive seasons, ending with this edition.

== Round summaries ==
=== First round ===
Thursday, June 11, 2009

Place	Player	Score	To par
1	(United States) Nicole Castrale	65	−7
2	(Sweden) Anna Nordqvist	66	−6
3	(China) Shanshan Feng	67	−5
T4	(South Korea) Na Yeon Choi	68	−4
T4	(United States) Moira Dunn	68	−4
T4	(United States) Stacy Lewis	68	−4
T4	(United States) Paige Mackenzie	68	−4
T4	(South Africa) Ashleigh Simon	68	−4
T4	(South Korea) Aree Song	68	−4
T4	(South Korea) Amy Yang	68	−4

=== Second round ===
Friday, June 12, 2009

Place	Player	Score	To par
1	(Sweden) Anna Nordqvist	66-70=136	−8
2	(United States) Nicole Castrale	65-72=137	−7
T3	(Australia) Katherine Hull	69-69=138	−6
T3	(Australia) Lindsey Wright	70-68=138	−6
T5	(South Korea) Kyeong Bae	70-69=139	−5
T5	(South Korea) Na Yeon Choi	68-71=139	−5
T5	(South Korea) Hee-Won Han	70-69=139	−5
T8	(United States) Stacy Lewis	68-72=140	−4
T8	(South Korea) Jin Young Pak	69-71=140	−4
T8	(United States) Kristy McPherson	70-70=140	−4

=== Third round ===
Saturday, June 13, 2009
Sunday, June 14, 2009

Place	Player	Score	To par
1	(Sweden) Anna Nordqvist	66-70-69=205	−11
2	(Australia) Lindsey Wright	70-68-69=207	−9
T3	(South Korea) Na Yeon Choi	68-71-70=209	−7
T3	(South Korea) Jin Young Pak	69-71-69=209	−7
T5	(United States) Kristy McPherson	70-70-70=210	−6
T5	(South Korea) Jiyai Shin	73-68-69=210	−6
T7	(South Korea) Kyeong Bae	70-69-72=211	−5
T7	(United States) Nicole Castrale	65-72-74=211	−5
T7	(United States) Stacy Lewis	68-72-71=211	−5
T7	(United States) Angela Stanford	70-71-70=211	−5

=== Final round ===
Sunday, June 14, 2009

Place	Player	Score	To par	Money ($)
1	(Sweden) Anna Nordqvist	66-70-69-68=273	−15	300,000
2	(Australia) Lindsey Wright	70-68-69-70=277	−11	182,956
3	(South Korea) Jiyai Shin	73-68-69-68=278	−10	132,721
4	(South Korea) Kyeong Bae	70-69-72-68=279	−9	102,670
T5	(United States) Nicole Castrale	65-72-74-69=280	−8	68,948
T5	(United States) Kristy McPherson	70-70-70-70=280	−8	68,948
T5	(United States) Angela Stanford	70-71-70-69=280	−8	68,948
8	(South Korea) Na Yeon Choi	68-71-70-72=281	−7	49,584
T9	(South Korea) Song-Hee Kim	73-72-68-69=282	−6	39,441
T9	(United States) Stacy Lewis	68-72-71-71=282	−6	39,441
T9	(South Korea) Jin Young Pak	69-71-69-73=282	−6	39,441
T9	(South Korea) Amy Yang	68-74-70-70=282	−6	39,441
