= Women's PGA Championship =

Golf tournament in the United States

Coordinates: 33.213°N 96.853°W

Tournament information
- Location: Varies - United States; Chaska, Minnesota (2026)
- Established: 1955, 71 years ago
- Course: Hazeltine National Golf Club
- Par: 72 (2026)
- Length: 6,807 yards (6,224 m) (2026)
- Organized by: PGA of America (2015–present); LPGA (1955–2014)
- Tour: LPGA Tour
- Format: Stroke play – 72 holes
- Prize fund: $13 million (2026)
- Month played: June

Tournament record score
- Aggregate: 266 Kim Sei-young (2020)
- To par: −19 Nelly Korda (2021) −19 Inbee Park (2015) −19 Yani Tseng (2011) −19 Cristie Kerr (2010)

Current champion
- (South Korea) Ryu Hae-ran

Current tournament
- 2026 Women's PGA Championship

The Women's PGA Championship (branded as the KPMG Women's PGA Championship for sponsorship reasons) is a women's professional golf tournament. First held in 1955, it is one of five majors on the LPGA Tour. It is not recognized as a major by the Ladies European Tour, which does not recognize any of the three majors played in the United States.

Formerly known as the LPGA Championship, the LPGA (Ladies Professional Golf Association) announced in 2014 that the PGA of America would become a partner of the event, and that it would be renamed the Women's PGA Championship beginning in 2015—becoming a sister event to the men's PGA Championship (in a similar manner to the U.S. Women's Open being a sister event to the men's U.S. Open). The partnership included a new title sponsorship agreement with KPMG, an increase in purse, and a commitment by NBC to provide network television coverage of the weekend rounds.

The PGA of America partnership also allowed the tournament to be held at various top courses around the United States. Previously, the LPGA Championship had been usually held at a consistent location each year, most recently near Rochester, New York, as part of a title sponsorship agreement with Western New York–based supermarket chain Wegmans.

== Professional-amateur controversy ==
Prior to 2005, the LPGA Championship had a "professionals only" rule. This is similar to the men's PGA Championship, but contrasts with the U.S. and British Opens, which have long had both amateur and professional entrants through qualifying (henceforth the term "open"). Until its takeover by the PGA of America in 2015, the tournament was the LPGA's own event, and the LPGA was created specifically to provide opportunities for women in professional golf.

In 2005 this rule was revoked, effectively to allow 15-year-old amateur Michelle Wie to compete, in order to attract more media coverage and sell more tickets, though this was not publicly acknowledged by the LPGA. Some professionals objected to this move, as they felt that places given to amateurs would come at the expense of the LPGA Tour's less successful professionals, who need to play regularly to make a living. One of the leading professionals, Laura Davies, stated objections to the change were shortsighted.

At the time, Wie had made the cut in all five majors that she had played, with two top-ten finishes, and had also played twice in the Sony Open in Hawaii on the PGA Tour, but missed both cuts. Despite the controversy, she outscored all but one of the pros in the 2005 LPGA Championship and was the runner-up, three strokes behind three-time champion Annika Sörenstam.

In 2006, the LPGA Championship reverted to its "professionals only" status, with only pros in the field. Wie had turned professional the previous October, upon signing multimillion-dollar endorsement contracts with Nike, Sony, and other sponsors.

== Tournament names ==
Tournament names through the years:

Years	Tournament name
1955–1970	LPGA Championship
1971–1972	Eve-LPGA Championship
1973–1986	LPGA Championship
1987–1993	Mazda LPGA Championship
1994–2000	McDonald's LPGA Championship
2001–2003	McDonald's LPGA Championship presented by AIG
2004–2009	McDonald's LPGA Championship presented by Coca-Cola
2010	LPGA Championship presented by Wegmans
2011–2014	Wegmans LPGA Championship
2015–	KPMG Women's PGA Championship

== Winners ==
Year	Dates	Champion	Score	To par	Margin of victory	Location	Purse ($)	Winner's share ($)
2026	Jun 25–28	(South Korea) Ryu Hae-ran	275	–13	2 strokes	Hazeltine National Golf Club	13,000,000	1,950,000
2025	Jun 19–23	(Australia) Minjee Lee	284	–4	3 strokes	PGA Frisco	12,000,000	1,800,000
2024	Jun 20–23	(South Korea) Amy Yang	281	−7	3 strokes	Sahalee Country Club	10,400,000	1,560,000
2023	Jun 22–25	(China) Yin Ruoning	276	−8	1 stroke	Baltusrol Golf Club	10,000,000	1,500,000
2022	Jun 23–26	(South Korea) Chun In-gee	283	−5	1 stroke	Congressional Country Club	9,000,000	1,350,000
2021	Jun 24–27	(United States) Nelly Korda	269	−19	3 strokes	Atlanta Athletic Club	4,500,000	675,000
2020	Oct 8–11	(South Korea) Kim Sei-young	266	−14	5 strokes	Aronimink Golf Club	4,300,000	645,000
2019	Jun 20–23	(Australia) Hannah Green	279	−9	1 stroke	Hazeltine National Golf Club	3,850,000	577,500
2018	Jun 28 – Jul 1	(South Korea) Park Sung-hyun	278	−10	Playoff	Kemper Lakes Golf Club	3,650,000	547,500
2017	Jun 29 – Jul 2	(United States) Danielle Kang	271	−13	1 stroke	Olympia Fields Country Club	3,500,000	525,000
2016	Jun 9–12	(Canada) Brooke Henderson	278	−6	Playoff	Sahalee Country Club	3,500,000	525,000
2015	Jun 11–14	(South Korea) Inbee Park (3)	273	−19	5 strokes	Westchester Country Club	3,500,000	525,000
2014	Aug 14–17	(South Korea) Inbee Park (2)	277	−11	Playoff	Monroe Golf Club	2,250,000	337,500
2013	Jun 6–9	(South Korea) Inbee Park	283	−5	Playoff	Locust Hill Country Club	2,250,000	337,500
2012	Jun 7–10	(China) Shanshan Feng	282	−6	2 strokes	Locust Hill Country Club	2,500,000	375,000
2011	Jun 23–26	(Taiwan) Yani Tseng (2)	269	−19	10 strokes	Locust Hill Country Club	2,500,000	375,000
2010	Jun 24–27	(United States) Cristie Kerr	269	−19	12 strokes	Locust Hill Country Club	2,250,000	337,500
2009	Jun 11–14	(Sweden) Anna Nordqvist	273	−15	4 strokes	Bulle Rock Golf Course	2,000,000	300,000
2008	Jun 5–8	(Taiwan) Yani Tseng	276	−12	Playoff	Bulle Rock Golf Course	2,000,000	300,000
2007	Jun 7–10	(Norway) Suzann Pettersen	274	−14	1 stroke	Bulle Rock Golf Course	2,000,000	300,000
2006	Jun 8–11	(South Korea) Se Ri Pak (3)	280	−8	Playoff	Bulle Rock Golf Course	1,800,000	270,000
2005	Jun 9–12	(Sweden) Annika Sörenstam (3)	277	−11	3 strokes	Bulle Rock Golf Course	1,800,000	270,000
2004	Jun 10–13	(Sweden) Annika Sörenstam (2)	271	−17	3 strokes	DuPont Country Club	1,600,000	240,000
2003	Jun 5–8	(Sweden) Annika Sörenstam	278	−6	Playoff	DuPont Country Club	1,600,000	240,000
2002	Jun 6–9	(South Korea) Se Ri Pak (2)	279	−5	3 strokes	DuPont Country Club	1,500,000	225,000
2001	Jun 21–24	(Australia) Karrie Webb	270	−14	2 strokes	DuPont Country Club	1,500,000	225,000
2000	Jun 22–25	(United States) Juli Inkster (2)	281	−3	Playoff	DuPont Country Club	1,400,000	210,000
1999	Jun 24–27	(United States) Juli Inkster	268	−16	4 strokes	DuPont Country Club	1,400,000	210,000
1998	May 14–17	(South Korea) Se Ri Pak	273	−11	3 strokes	DuPont Country Club	1,300,000	195,000
1997	May 15–18	(United States) Christa Johnson	281	−3	Playoff	DuPont Country Club	1,200,000	180,000
1996	May 10–12	(England) Laura Davies (2)	213	E	1 stroke	DuPont Country Club	1,200,000	180,000
1995	May 11–14	(United States) Kelly Robbins	274	−10	1 stroke	DuPont Country Club	1,200,000	180,000
1994	May 12–15	(England) Laura Davies	279	−5	3 strokes	DuPont Country Club	1,100,000	165,000
1993	Jun 10–13	(United States) Patty Sheehan (3)	275	−9	1 stroke	Bethesda Country Club	1,000,000	150,000
1992	May 14–17	(United States) Betsy King	267	−17	11 strokes	Bethesda Country Club	1,000,000	150,000
1991	Jun 27–30	(United States) Meg Mallon	274	−10	1 stroke	Bethesda Country Club	1,000,000	150,000
1990	Jul 26–29	(United States) Beth Daniel	280	−4	1 stroke	Bethesda Country Club	1,000,000	150,000
1989	May 18–21	(United States) Nancy Lopez (3)	274	−14	3 strokes	Jack Nicklaus Sports Center	500,000	75,000
1988	May 19–22	(United States) Sherri Turner	281	−7	1 stroke	Jack Nicklaus Sports Center	350,000	52,500
1987	May 21–24	(United States) Jane Geddes	275	−13	1 stroke	Jack Nicklaus Sports Center	350,000	52,000
1986	May 29 – Jun 1	(United States) Pat Bradley	277	−11	1 stroke	Jack Nicklaus Sports Center	300,000	45,000
1985	May 30 – Jun 2	(United States) Nancy Lopez (2)	275	−15	8 strokes	Jack Nicklaus Sports Center	250,000	37,500
1984	May 31 – Jun 3	(United States) Patty Sheehan (2)	272	−16	10 strokes	Jack Nicklaus Sports Center	250,000	37,500
1983	Jun 9–12	(United States) Patty Sheehan	279	−9	2 strokes	Jack Nicklaus Sports Center	200,000	30,000
1982	Jun 10–13	(Australia) Jan Stephenson	279	−9	2 strokes	Jack Nicklaus Sports Center	200,000	30,000
1981	Jun 11–14	(United States) Donna Caponi (2)	280	−8	1 stroke	Jack Nicklaus Sports Center	150,000	22,500
1980	Jun 5–8	(South Africa) Sally Little	285	−3	3 strokes	Jack Nicklaus Sports Center	150,000	22,500
1979	Jun 7–10	(United States) Donna Caponi	279	−9	3 strokes	Jack Nicklaus Sports Center	150,000	22,500
1978	Jun 8–11	(United States) Nancy Lopez	275	−13	6 strokes	Jack Nicklaus Sports Center	150,000	22,500
1977	Jun 9–12	(Japan) Chako Higuchi	279	−9	3 strokes	Bay Tree Golf Plantation	150,000	22,500
1976	May 27–30	(United States) Betty Burfeindt	287	−5	1 stroke	Pine Ridge Golf Course	55,000	8,000
1975	May 29 – Jun 1	(United States) Kathy Whitworth (3)	288	−4	1 stroke	Pine Ridge Golf Course	55,000	8,000
1974	Jun 20–23	(United States) Sandra Haynie (2)	287	−5	2 strokes	Pleasant Valley Country Club	50,000	7,000
1973	Jun 7–10	(United States) Mary Mills (2)	288	−4	1 stroke	Pleasant Valley Country Club	35,000	5,250
1972	Jun 8–11	(United States) Kathy Ahern	293	+1	6 strokes	Pleasant Valley Country Club	50,000	7,500
1971	Jun 10–13	(United States) Kathy Whitworth (2)	288	−4	4 strokes	Pleasant Valley Country Club	53,000	7,950
1970	Jun 10–13	(United States) Shirley Englehorn	285	−7	Playoff	Pleasant Valley Country Club	30,000	4,500
1969	Jul 23–27	(United States) Betsy Rawls (2)	293	+1	4 strokes	Concord Golf Course	35,000	5,250
1968	Jun 20–23	(Canada) Sandra Post	294	+2	Playoff	Pleasant Valley Country Club	20,000	3,000
1967	Jul 13–16	(United States) Kathy Whitworth	284	−8	1 stroke	Pleasant Valley Country Club	17,500	2,625
1966	Sep 22–25	(United States) Gloria Ehret	282	−2	3 strokes	Stardust Country Club	17,500	2,475
1965	Sep 23–26	(United States) Sandra Haynie	279	−5	1 stroke	Stardust Country Club	17,500	2,475
1964	Oct 1–4	(United States) Mary Mills	278	−6	2 strokes	Stardust Country Club	16,500	2,450
1963	Oct 10–13	(United States) Mickey Wright (4)	294	+10	2 strokes	Stardust Country Club	16,500	2,450
1962	Oct 4–7	(United States) Judy Kimball	282	−2	4 strokes	Stardust Country Club	15,000	2,300
1961	Oct 12–15	(United States) Mickey Wright (3)	287	+3	9 strokes	Stardust Country Club	15,000	2,500
1960	Jul 1–4	(United States) Mickey Wright (2)	292	−4	3 strokes	Sheraton Hotel Country Club	8,500	1,500
1959	Jul 2–6	(United States) Betsy Rawls	288	−8	1 stroke	Sheraton Hotel Country Club	7,500	1,247
1958	Jun 5–8	(United States) Mickey Wright	288	+8	6 strokes	Churchill Valley Country Club	7,500	1,247
1957	Jun 6–9	(United States) Louise Suggs	285	+5	3 strokes	Churchill Valley Country Club	7,600	1,316
1956	Jun 21–24	(United States) Marlene Hagge	291	−9	Playoff	Forest Lake Country Club	6,500	1,350
1955	Jul 14–17	(United States) Beverly Hanson	4 & 3			Orchard Ridge Country Club	6,000	1,200

Note: Green highlight indicates scoring records.

== Multiple champions ==
Player	Total	Years
(United States) Mickey Wright ‡	4	1958, 1960, 1961, 1963
(United States) Kathy Whitworth	3	1967, 1971, 1975
(United States) Nancy Lopez	3	1978, 1985, 1989
(United States) Patty Sheehan	3	1983, 1984, 1993
(Sweden) Annika Sörenstam ‡	3	2003, 2004, 2005
(South Korea) Se Ri Pak	3	1998, 2002, 2006
(South Korea) Inbee Park‡	3	2013, 2014, 2015
(United States) Betsy Rawls	2	1959, 1969
(United States) Mary Mills	2	1964, 1973
(United States) Sandra Haynie	2	1965, 1974
(United States) Donna Caponi	2	1979, 1981
(England) Laura Davies	2	1994, 1996
(United States) Juli Inkster ‡	2	1999, 2000
(Taiwan) Yani Tseng	2	2008, 2011

Career Grand Slam winners ‡

The defending champion has retained the title on seven occasions, most recently in 2015:

- 2015 – Inbee Park
- 2014 – Inbee Park
- 2005 – Annika Sörenstam
- 2004 – Annika Sörenstam
- 2000 – Juli Inkster
- 1984 – Patty Sheehan
- 1961 – Mickey Wright

Through 2022, three consecutive championships has been achieved only twice, by Sörenstam (2005) and Park (2015).

== Sites by state ==
State	Times hosted	First	Last
Indiana	3	1955	1960
Michigan	1	1956	1956
Pennsylvania	3	1957	2020
Nevada	6	1961	1966
Massachusetts	7	1967	1974
New York	7	1969	2015
Maryland	12	1990	2022
South Carolina	1	1977	1977
Ohio	12	1978	1989
Delaware	11	1994	2004
Minnesota	2	2019	2026
Washington	2	2016	2024
Illinois	2	2017	2018
Georgia	1	2021	2021
New Jersey	1	2023	2023
Texas	1	2025	2025

== Future sites ==
Since the PGA of America took control of the tournament in 2015, venues will often bid for both a men's, women's, and seniors' PGA Championship together. Aronimink Golf Club, which hosted the men's in 1962 and seniors in 2003, was awarded a joint bid for the 2020 women's and 2027 men's. Congressional Country Club was awarded the 2025 seniors and both the 2022 and 2027 women's championships. Baltusrol Golf Club, which had hosted the 2005 and 2016 men's championships, was awarded the 2023 women's and 2029 men's championships together. The tournament will also be held at the PGA of America's new home in Frisco, Texas.

Year	Edition	Course	Location	Dates	Hosted (W)	Hosted (Men's)	Hosted (Sr)	Notes
2027	73rd	Congressional Country Club	Bethesda, Maryland	June 24-27	2022	1976, 2030	2025	
2028	74th	Bethpage State Park Black Course	Farmingdale, New York	—N/a		2019, 2033		
2029	75th							
2030	76th							
2031	77th	PGA Frisco	Frisco, Texas	—N/a	2025	2027, 2034	2023, 2029	
