= 2008 Women's British Open =

Coordinates: 51.388°N 0.631°W

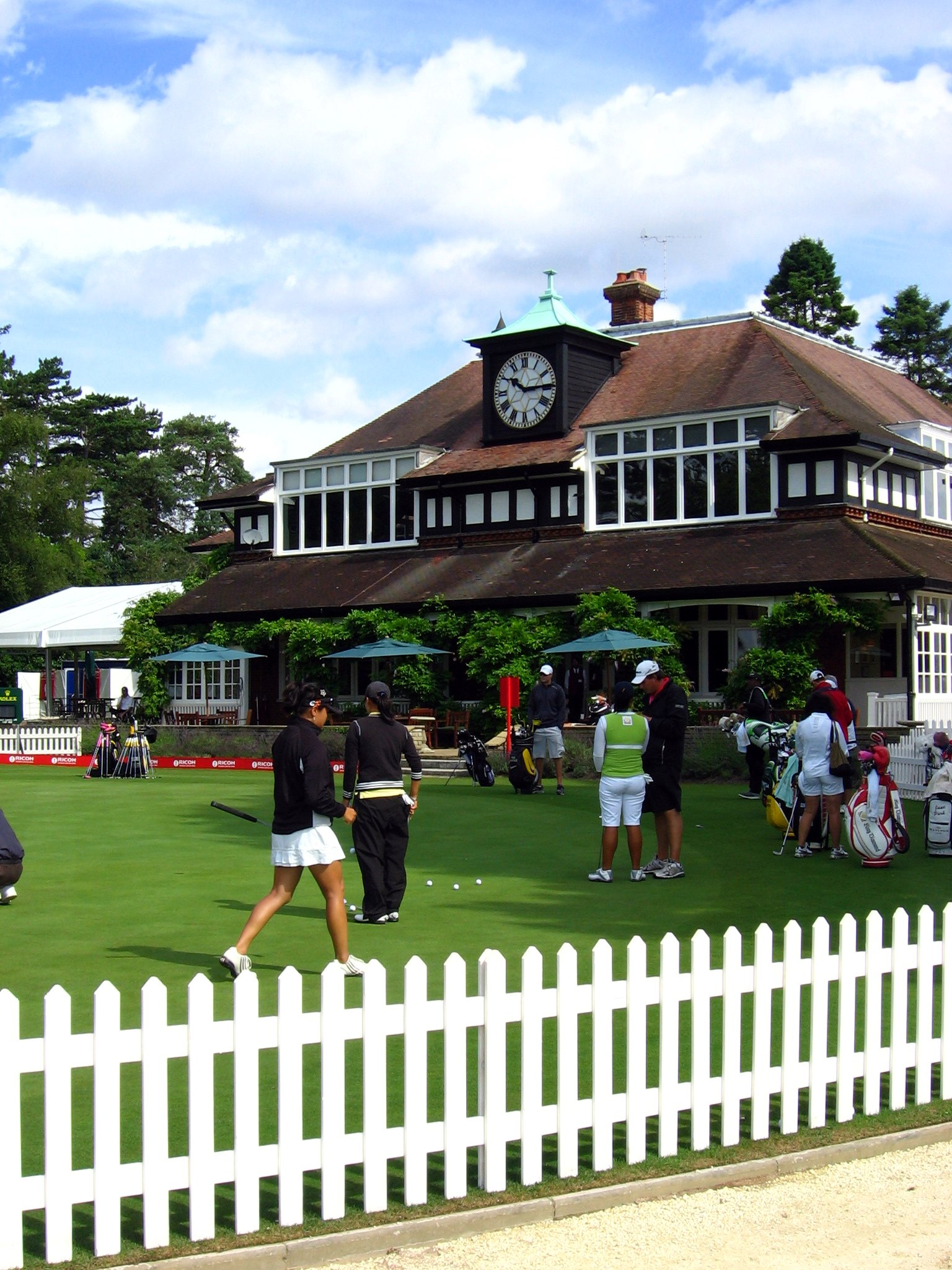
- Sunningdale Clubhouse

Tournament information
- Dates: 31 July – 3 August 2008
- Location: Sunningdale, Berkshire, England
- Courses: Sunningdale Golf Club; Old Course
- Organized by: Ladies' Golf Union
- Tours: LPGA Tour; Ladies European Tour

Statistics
- Par: 72
- Length: 6,408 yards (5,859 m)
- Field: 156 players, 78 after cut
- Cut: 145 (+1)
- Prize fund: US$2,100,000 €1,351,213
- Winner's share: $314,464 €202,337

Champion
- (South Korea) Jiyai Shin
- 270 (−18)

Location in England

The 2008 Women's British Open was held 31 July to 3 August at the Old Course of Sunningdale Golf Club in Sunningdale, Berkshire, England, west of London. It was the 32nd Women's British Open and the eighth as a major championship on the LPGA Tour. Sunningdale hosted its fourth Women's British Open and its third as an LPGA major.

Jiyai Shin shot a final round 66 (−6) to win her first major championship, three strokes ahead of runner-up Yani Tseng. Shin won the title again in 2012, while Tseng won consecutive titles in 2010 and 2011.

It was the final major for 2003 champion Annika Sörenstam, who finished a dozen strokes back.

== Field ==
1. Top 15 players from the 2007 championship.
Lorena Ochoa (champion), Maria Hjorth, Jee Young Lee, Reilly Rankin, Se Ri Pak, Ji Eun-hee, Miki Saiki, Paula Creamer, Linda Wessburg, Catriona Matthew, Inbee Park, Mhairi McKay, Yuri Fudoh, Na On Min, Brittany Lincicome

2. Top 10 players from the Ladies European Tour as specified by the Rolex Rankings.
Helen Alfredsson, Minea Blomqvist, Laura Davies, Louise Friberg, Sophie Gustafson, Suzann Pettersen, Song Bo-bae, Annika Sörenstam, Lindsey Wright

3. Top 30 players from the LPGA Tour as specified by the Rolex Rankings.
Shi Hyun Ahn, Nicole Castrale, Na Yeon Choi, Laura Diaz, Natalie Gulbis, Hee-Won Han, Juli Inkster, Jeong Jang, Cristie Kerr, Christina Kim, In-Kyung Kim, Mi-Hyun Kim, Brittany Lang, Seon Hwa Lee, Ai Miyazato, Angela Park, Stacy Prammanasudh, Morgan Pressel, Angela Stanford, Sherri Steinhauer, Yani Tseng, Momoko Ueda, Karrie Webb

4. Top 25 players in the 2008 Ladies European Tour Order of Merit who have not been specified yet.
Maria Boden, Stacy Bregman, Becky Brewerton, Anne-Lise Caudal, Martina Eberl, Nikki Garrett, Lisa Hall, Felicity Johnson, Ludivine Kreutz, Diana Luna, Paula Martí, Joanne Mills, Gwladys Nocera, Marta Prito, Melissa Reid, Marianne Skarpnord, Lisa Holm Sorensen, Louise Stahle, Maria Verchenova, Johanna Westerburg, Amy Yang, Emma Zackrisson, Veronica Zorzi

5. Top 40 players from the 2008 LPGA Tour Money List not already specified.
Kyeong Bae, Irene Cho, H.J. Choi, Diane D'Alessio, Allison Fouch, Sandra Gal, Russy Gulyanamitta, Johanna Head, Rachel Hetherington, Katherine Hull, Karine Icher, Kang Soo-yun, Young Kim, Carin Koch, Kelli Kuehne, Candie Kung, Meena Lee, Leta Lindley, Teresa Lu, Meg Mallon, Jill McGill, Kristy McPherson, Janice Moodie, Becky Morgan, Ji Young Oh, Hee Young Park, Jane Park, Alena Sharp, Karin Sjödin, Kris Tamulis, Wendy Ward, Sun Young Yoo, Heather Young

6. Top 5 players from the Japan LPGA Tour in 2008.
Yukari Baba, Ji-Hee Lee, Eun-A Lim, Sakura Yokomine

7. Winners of LPGA and Ladies European Tour tournaments in 2008 who have not been specified yet.
Trish Johnson

8. Winners of the 2007 LPGA, Korean LPGA Tour, Japan LPGA Tour, and Ladies European Tour money lists who have not been specified yet.
Jiyai Shin

9. Past ten winners of the Women's British Open.
None not already specified.

10. Past five winners of the U.S. Women's Open.
None not already specified.

11. Past five winners of the Kraft Nabisco Championship.
Grace Park

12. Past five winners of the LPGA Championship.
None not already specified.

13. Winner of the Japan LPGA Tour Championship Ricoh Cup.
None not already specified.

14. Top 5 finishers from the Jamie Farr Owens Corning Classic who are not otherwise exempt.
Moira Dunn, Shanshan Feng, Katie Futcher, Paige Mackenzie, Gloria Park

15. The 2008 Ladies British Amateur champ, the 2007 U.S. Women's Amateur champ, the 2007 European Ladies Amateur champ (if all have not turned pro before championship).
Caroline Hedwall (a), Anna Nordqvist (a), Maria José Uribe (a)

16. Players successful in Final Qualifying (28 July)
Liz Bennett (a), Erica Blasberg, Krystle Caithness (a), Rebecca Coakley, Claire Coughlan-Ryan, Stefani Croce, Naomi Edwards (a), Tanya Elosegui Mayor, Lora Fairclough, Martina Gillen, Lydia Hall (a), Leah Hart, Samantha Head, Kiran Matharu, Anja Monke, Lee-Ann Pace, Margherita Rigon, Iben Tinning, Marjet van der Graff.

== Course layout ==
Old Course

Hole	1	2	3	4	5	6	7	8	9	Out	10	11	12	13	14	15	16	17	18	In	Total
Yards	485	489	318	152	400	386	393	168	273	3,064	459	322	416	182	503	210	415	425	412	3,344	6,408
Par	5	5	4	3	4	4	4	3	4	36	5	4	4	3	5	3	4	4	4	36	72

Previous lengths of the course for the Women's British Open (since 2001):

- 2004: 6,392 yards (5,845 m), par 72
- 2001: 6,255 yards (5,720 m), par 72

== Round summaries ==
=== First round ===
Thursday, 31 July 2008

The first round lead belonged to 48-year-old Juli Inkster at 65 (−7), as 64 players broke par. One stroke back were seven players at 66 (−6): Momoko Ueda, Laura Diaz, Johanna Head, Yuri Fudoh, Ji Young Oh, Jiyai Shin, and Stacy Prammanasudh. Four players were tied at two shots off the pace, including the 2004 champion at Sunningdale; Karen Stupples. Many well-known players stood at 69 (−3), including number-one ranked player Lorena Ochoa, Natalie Gulbis, and last week's Evian Masters winner Helen Alfredsson. However, many other top-ranked or well-known players struggled with their rounds, including Cristie Kerr at 71 and Paula Creamer, Karrie Webb, and Annika Sörenstam at even-par 72.

Place	Player	Score	To par
1	(United States) Juli Inkster	65	−7
T2	(Japan) Momoko Ueda	66	−6
T2	(United States) Laura Diaz	66	−6
T2	(South Korea) Ji Young Oh	66	−6
T2	(Japan) Yuri Fudoh	66	−6
T2	(England) Johanna Head	66	−6
T2	(United States) Stacy Prammanasudh	66	−6
T2	(South Korea) Jiyai Shin	66	−6
T9	(United States) Kristy McPherson	67	−5
T9	(England) Karen Stupples	67	−5
T9	(England) Rebecca Hudson	67	−5
T9	(United States) Sherri Steinhauer	67	−5

=== Second round ===
Friday, 1 August 2008

Friday's low round of 65 (−7) belonged to Kerr, who jumped into a tie for fourth at 136 (−8). First-round leader Inkster shot a 70 for 135 (−9) and in sole possession of third place. The co-leaders after 36 holes were Fudoh and Shin; each shot 68 to improve to 134 (−10).

Place	Player	Score	To par
T1	(Japan) Yuri Fudoh	66-68=134	−10
T1	(South Korea) Jiyai Shin	66-68=134	−10
3	(United States) Juli Inkster	65-70=135	−9
T4	(United States) Cristie Kerr	71-65=136	−8
T4	(South Korea) Song Bo-bae	68-68=136	−8
T6	(United States) Natalie Gulbis	69-68=137	−7
T6	(Japan) Ai Miyazato	73-69=137	−7
T6	(Mexico) Lorena Ochoa	69-68=137	−7
T9	(United States) Laura Diaz	66-72=138	−6
T9	(Japan) Momoko Ueda	66-72=138	−6
T9	(Sweden) Sophie Gustafson	69-69=138	−6
T9	(South Korea) Ji Eun-hee	68-70=138	−6

Amateurs: Nordqvist (−1), Uribe (+1), Bennett (+2), Feng (+2), Gal (+3), Edwards (+4), Hall (+8), Caithness (+11), Hedwall (+11).

=== Third round ===
Saturday, 2 August 2008

Place	Player	Score	To par
1	(Japan) Yuri Fudoh	66-68-69=203	−13
2	(South Korea) Jiyai Shin	66-68-70=204	−12
3	(Japan) Ai Miyazato	68-69-68=205	−11
T4	(United States) Juli Inkster	65-70-71=206	−10
T4	(United States) Cristie Kerr	71-65-70=206	−10
T6	(United States) Natalie Gulbis	69-68-70=207	−9
T6	(South Korea) Ji Eun-hee	68-70-69=207	−9
T6	(South Korea) Mi Hyun Kim	70-70-67=207	−9
T6	(Taiwan) Yani Tseng	70-69-68=207	−9
T10	(South Korea) Na Yeon Choi	69-71-68=207	−8
T10	(Mexico) Lorena Ochoa	69-68-71=207	−8
T10	(Japan) Momoko Ueda	66-72-70=207	−8

=== Final round ===
Sunday, 3 August 2008

Place	Player	Score	To par	Money (US$)
1	(South Korea) Jiyai Shin	66-68-70-66=270	−18	314,464
2	(Taiwan) Yani Tseng	70-69-68-66=273	−15	196,540
T3	(Japan) Yuri Fudoh	66-68-69-71=274	−14	122,838
T3	(South Korea) Ji Eun-hee	68-70-69-67=274	−14	122,838
5	(Japan) Ai Miyazato	68-69-68-70=275	−13	88,443
6	(United States) Cristie Kerr	71-65-70-70=276	−12	76,651
T7	(Mexico) Lorena Ochoa	69-68-71-69=277	−11	65,841
T7	(Japan) Momoko Ueda	66-72-70-69=277	−11	65,841
T9	(United States) Paula Creamer	72-69-70-67=278	−10	47,563
T9	(United States) Natalie Gulbis	69-68-70-71=278	−10	47,563
T9	(South Korea) Hee-Won Han	71-69-71-67=278	−10	47,563
T9	(South Korea) In-Kyung Kim	71-68-72-67=278	−10	47,563
T9	(Australia) Karrie Webb	72-69-69-68=278	−10	47,563

Amateurs: Nordqvist (−3), Uribe (+6).

==== Scorecard ====
Final round

Hole	1	2	3	4	5	6	7	8	9	10	11	12	13	14	15	16	17	18
Par	5	5	4	3	4	4	4	3	4	5	4	4	3	5	3	4	4	4
(South Korea) Shin	−13	−13	−13	−13	−14	−14	−14	−14	−15	−16	−16	−16	−17	−18	−18	−18	−18	−18
(Taiwan) Tseng	−10	−11	−11	−11	−11	−11	−11	−10	−11	−12	−12	−12	−12	−13	−14	−14	−14	−15
(Japan) Fudoh	−14	−14	−14	−14	−14	−14	−14	−14	−13	−14	−14	−14	−14	−14	−15	−14	−14	−14
(South Korea) Ji	−10	−12	−12	−11	−11	−11	−11	−11	−12	−13	−14	−13	−13	−13	−13	−13	−13	−14
(Japan) Miyazato	−12	−13	−13	−13	−13	−13	−12	−13	−13	−14	−14	−14	−14	−15	−15	−15	−15	−13
(United States) Kerr	−10	−11	−11	−12	−12	−12	−11	−10	−11	−12	−13	−12	−12	−12	−12	−12	−12	−12
(Mexico) Ochoa	−9	−9	−9	−9	−10	−10	−10	−10	−11	−11	−11	−11	−11	−10	−10	−10	−10	−11
(Japan) Ueda	−9	−9	−9	−9	−9	−9	−9	−9	−10	−11	−11	−11	−10	−11	−11	−11	−11	−11

Cumulative tournament scores, relative to par

Eagle	Birdie	Bogey	Double bogey
