= 2006 Women's British Open =

Coordinates: 53.7495°N 3.0180°W

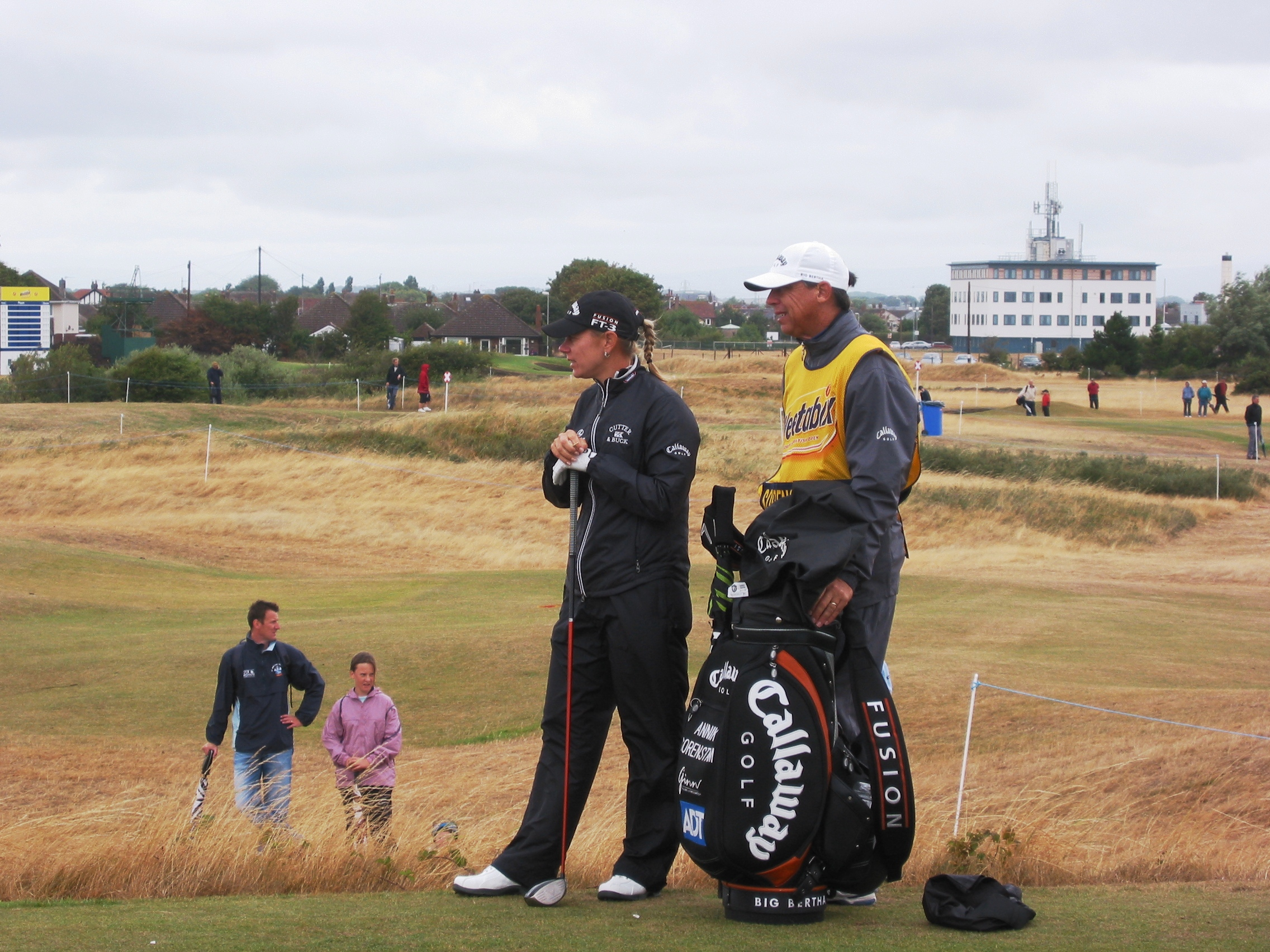
- Annika Sörenstam and caddy Terry McNamara on the 4th tee during the Pro-Am

Tournament information
- Dates: 3–6 August 2006
- Location: Lancashire, England
- Course: Royal Lytham & St Annes; Golf Club
- Organized by: Ladies' Golf Union
- Tours: LPGA Tour; Ladies European Tour

Statistics
- Par: 72
- Length: 6,480 yards (5,925 m)
- Field: 150 players, 72 after cut
- Cut: 151 (+7)
- Prize fund: $1,800,000 €1,384,186
- Winner's share: $305,440 €234,880

Champion
- (United States) Sherri Steinhauer
- 281 (−7)

Location in England

The 2006 Women's British Open was held 3–6 August at Royal Lytham & St Annes Golf Club in Lancashire, England. It was the 30th edition of the Women's British Open, and the sixth as a major championship on the LPGA Tour.

Sherri Steinhauer, 43, won her second major title, three strokes ahead of runners-up Sophie Gustafson and Cristie Kerr. It was Steinhauer's third win at the Women's British Open, but the first since it was designated a major in 2001. The earlier wins were consecutive, in 1998 and 1999.

This was the final Women's British Open sponsored by Weetabix, which began its 20-year relationship with the event in 1987. It was replaced by Ricoh in 2007 at St. Andrews.

== Course layout ==
Hole	1	2	3	4	5	6	7	8	9	Out	10	11	12	13	14	15	16	17	18	In	Total
Yards	198	401	410	371	170	492	542	389	156	3,129	334	487	160	340	418	464	343	419	386	3,351	6,480
Par	3	4	4	4	3	5	5	4	3	35	4	5	3	4	4	5	4	4	4	37	72

Previous length of the course for the Women's British Open (since 2001):

- 2003: 6,308 yards (5,768 m), par 72

== Round summaries ==
=== First round ===
Thursday, 3 August 2006

Place	Player	Score	To par
1	(United States) Juli Inkster	66	−6
T2	(Italy) Silvia Cavalleri	69	−3
T2	(Sweden) Maria Hjorth	69	−3
T4	(United States) Allison Hanna	70	−2
T4	(France) Gwladys Nocera	70	−2
T4	(Sweden) Nina Reis	70	−2
T7	(Japan) Chieko Amanuma	71	−1
T7	(Switzerland) Nora Angehrn	71	−1
T7	(Paraguay) Julieta Granada	71	−1
T7	(Australia) Rachel Hetherington	71	−1
T7	(United States) Cristie Kerr	71	−1
T7	(United States) Christina Kim	71	−1
T7	(Japan) Ai Miyazato	71	−1
T7	(United States) Wendy Ward	71	−1
T7	(Australia) Lindsey Wright	71	−1

=== Second round ===
Friday, 4 August 2006

Place	Player	Score	To par
1	(United States) Juli Inkster	66-72=138	−6
2	(Italy) Silvia Cavalleri	69-72=141	−3
T3	(Canada) Lorie Kane	73-69=142	−2
T3	(United States) Candie Kung	72-70=142	−2
T3	(England) Karen Stupples	73-69=142	−2
T3	(Australia) Lindsey Wright	71-71=142	−2
T7	(South Korea) Chung Il-mi	72-71=143	−1
T7	(United States) Paula Creamer	72-71=143	−1
T7	(Sweden) Sophie Gustafson	76-67=143	−1
T7	(France) Gwladys Nocera	70-73=143	−1
T7	(Sweden) Annika Sörenstam	72-71=143	−1
T7	(United States) Sherri Steinhauer	73-70=143	−1

Amateurs: Mozo (+3), Yang (+6), Simon (+8), Schaeffer (+11), MacRae (+18).

=== Third round ===
Saturday, 5 August 2006

Place	Player	Score	To par
1	(United States) Sherri Steinhauer	73-70-66=209	−7
T2	(Sweden) Sophie Gustafson	76-67-69=212	−4
T2	(United States) Juli Inkster	66-72-74=212	−4
T2	(Mexico) Lorena Ochoa	74-73-65=212	−4
T2	(England) Karen Stupples	73-69-70=212	−4
T6	(United States) Natalie Gulbis	72-74-67=213	−3
T6	(United States) Cristie Kerr	71-76-66=213	−3
T6	(United States) Candie Kung	72-70-71=213	−3
T9	(United States) Beth Daniel	73-71-70=214	−2
T9	(Paraguay) Julieta Granada	71-73-70=214	−2
T9	(France) Gwladys Nocera	70-73-71=214	−2

=== Final round ===
Sunday, 6 August 2006

Place	Player	Score	To par	Money ($)
1	(United States) Sherri Steinhauer	73-70-66-72=281	−7	305,440
T2	(Sweden) Sophie Gustafson	76-67-69-72=284	−4	162,265
T2	(United States) Cristie Kerr	71-76-66-71=284	−4	162,265
T4	(United States) Juli Inkster	66-72-74-73=285	−3	95,450
T4	(Mexico) Lorena Ochoa	74-73-65-73=285	−3	95,450
T6	(United States) Beth Daniel	73-71-70-72=286	−2	70,633
T6	(Canada) Lorie Kane	73-69-74-70=286	−2	70,633
8	(Paraguay) Julieta Granada	71-73-70-73=287	−1	61,088
9	(Japan) Ai Miyazato	71-75-75-67=288	E	55,361
T10	(South Korea) Hee-Won Han	80-71-69-70=290	+2	40,566
T10	(France) Karine Icher	72-73-71-74=290	+2	40,566
T10	(South Korea) Kim Joo-mi	73-73-73-71=290	+2	40,566
T10	(United States) Candie Kung	72-70-71-77=290	+2	40,566
T10	(Sweden) Nina Reis	70-76-69-75=290	+2	40,566
T10	(England) Karen Stupples	73-69-70-78=290	+2	40,566

Amateurs: Yang (+13), Mozo (+19)
