= 2009 Women's British Open =

Coordinates: 53.7495°N 3.0180°W

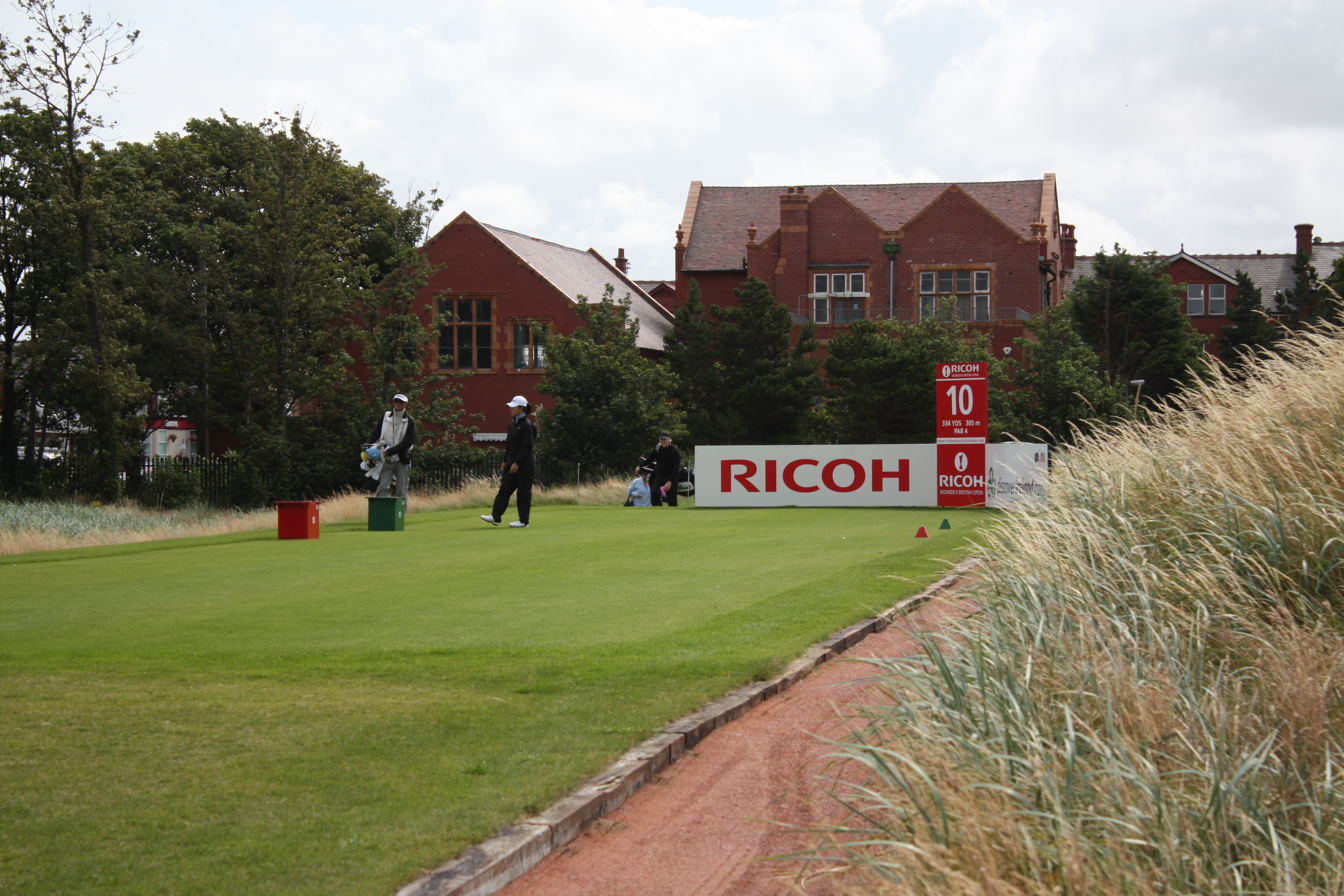
- 10th hole tee box at the Women's Open

Tournament information
- Dates: 30 July – 2 August 2009
- Location: Lancashire, England
- Course: Royal Lytham & St Annes; Golf Club
- Organized by: Ladies' Golf Union
- Tours: LPGA Tour; Ladies European Tour

Statistics
- Par: 72
- Length: 6,492 yards (5,936 m)
- Field: 144 players, 71 after cut
- Cut: 153 (+9)
- Prize fund: $2,200,000 €1,543,520
- Winner's share: $335,000 €235,036

Champion
- (Scotland) Catriona Matthew
- 285 (−3)

Location in England

The 2009 Women's British Open was held 30 July – 2 August at Royal Lytham & St Annes Golf Club in Lancashire, England. It was the 33rd Women's British Open and the ninth as a major championship on the LPGA Tour. Catriona Matthew won her only major, three strokes ahead of runner-up Karrie Webb.

It was the fourth Women's British Open at Royal Lytham and the third as an LPGA major, most recently in 2006. The course had also hosted ten Open Championships, most recently in 2001. The par-72 course was set by the Ladies Golf Union at 6,492 yards (5,936 m), 413 yards (378 m) shorter than the par-71 set-up for The Open Championship in 2001.

Matthew became the first Scot to win the title, just eleven weeks after giving birth to her second child in mid-May.

== Course layout ==
Hole	1	2	3	4	5	6	7	8	9	Out	10	11	12	13	14	15	16	17	18	In	Total
Yards	199	401	419	371	170	492	542	389	156	3,139	334	487	160	340	420	464	343	419	386	3,353	6,492
Par	3	4	4	4	3	5	5	4	3	35	4	5	3	4	4	5	4	4	4	37	72

Previous lengths of the course for the Women's British Open (since 2001):

- 2006: 6,480 yards (5,925 m), par 72
- 2003: 6,308 yards (5,768 m), par 72

== Round summaries ==
=== First round ===
Thursday, 30 July 2009

Place	Player	Score	To par
1	(Germany) Sandra Gal	69	−3
T2	(South Korea) Song-Hee Kim	70	−2
T2	(United States) Angela Stanford	70	−2
T4	(Japan) Yuko Mitsuka	71	−1
T4	(South Korea) Hee-Young Park	71	−1
6	(Sweden) Maria Hjorth	72	E
T7	(South Korea) Kyeong Eun Bae	73	+1
T7	(United States) Christina Kim	73	+1
T7	(Scotland) Vikki Laing	73	+1
T7	(United States) Michelle Wie	73	+1

=== Second round ===
Friday, 31 July 2009

Place	Player	Score	To par
T1	(Scotland) Catriona Matthew	74-67=141	−3
T1	(Italy) Giulia Sergas	74-67=141	−3
3	(Japan) Yuko Mitsuka	71-71=142	−2
4	(South Korea) Song-Hee Kim	70-73=143	−1
T5	(South Korea) Kyeong Eun Bae	73-71=144	E
T5	(United States) Christina Kim	73-71=144	E
T5	(Taiwan) Yani Tseng	74-70=144	E
T8	(Sweden) Sophie Gustafson	74-71=145	+1
T8	(Norway) Marianne Skarpnord	76-69=145	+1
T10	(South Korea) Hee-Young Park	71-75=146	+2
T10	(United States) Jane Park	74-72=146	+2
T10	(Japan) Ai Miyazato	75-71=146	+2
T10	(United States) Angela Stanford	70-76=146	+2

=== Third round ===
Saturday, 1 August 2009

Place	Player	Score	To par
1	(Scotland) Catriona Matthew	74-67-71=212	−4
2	(United States) Christina Kim	73-71-71=215	−1
T3	(Japan) Ai Miyazato	75-71-70=216	E
T3	(South Korea) Jiyai Shin	77-71-68=216	E
T5	(South Korea) Song-Hee Kim	70-73-74=217	+1
T5	(Japan) Mika Miyazato	76-72-69=217	+1
T7	(South Korea) Kyeong Eun Bae	73-71-74=218	+2
T7	(United States) Paula Creamer	74-74-70=218	+2
T7	(Japan) Shinobu Moromizato	74-73-71=218	+2
T7	(United States) Jane Park	74-72-72=218	+2

=== Final round ===
Sunday, 2 August 2009

Place	Player	Score	To par	Money ($)
1	(Scotland) Catriona Matthew	74-67-71-73=285	−3	335,000
2	(Australia) Karrie Webb	77-71-72-68=288	E	210,000
T3	(United States) Paula Creamer	74-74-70-71=289	+1	109,500
T3	(South Korea) Hee-Won Han	77-73-69-70=289	+1	109,500
T3	(United States) Christina Kim	73-71-71-74=289	+1	109,500
T3	(Japan) Ai Miyazato	75-71-70-73=289	+1	109,500
7	(United States) Kristy McPherson	74-74-72-70=290	+2	74,000
T8	(South Korea) Na Yeon Choi	80-71-70-70=291	+3	61,000
T8	(United States) Cristie Kerr	76-71-75-69=291	+3	61,000
T8	(South Korea) Jiyai Shin	77-71-68-75=291	+3	61,000

==== Scorecard ====
Final round

Hole	1	2	3	4	5	6	7	8	9	10	11	12	13	14	15	16	17	18
Par	3	4	4	4	3	5	5	4	3	4	5	3	4	4	5	4	4	4
(Scotland) Matthew	−3	−3	−2	−2	−2	−2	−2	−2	−2	−1	−1	−1	−2	−3	−4	−4	−3	−3
(Australia) Webb	+4	+4	+4	+4	+4	+3	+3	+3	+3	+3	+3	+3	+3	+3	+1	E	E	E
(United States) Creamer	+3	+2	+2	+2	+2	+2	+1	+1	+1	+1	+1	+1	+1	+1	E	−1	−1	+1
(South Korea) Han	+3	+2	+2	+2	+3	+3	+3	+3	+3	+2	+1	+1	+1	+2	+1	+1	+1	+1
(United States) Kim	−1	E	E	+1	+2	+2	+1	+1	+1	+1	+1	E	E	+1	E	+1	+1	+1
(Japan) Miyazato	+1	E	+1	+1	+1	E	−1	−1	−1	−1	−1	−1	−1	E	−1	−1	+1	+1
(United States) McPherson	+4	+4	+5	+5	+5	+4	+4	+4	+4	+3	+2	+2	+2	+3	+3	+3	+2	+2
(South Korea) Shin	E	E	E	E	+1	+1	+1	+2	+2	+1	+1	+2	+2	+2	+1	+1	+1	+3

Cumulative tournament scores, relative to par

Eagle	Birdie	Bogey	Double bogey
