= Ji Eun-hee =

South Korean golfer (born 1986)

Ji Eun-hee 지은희
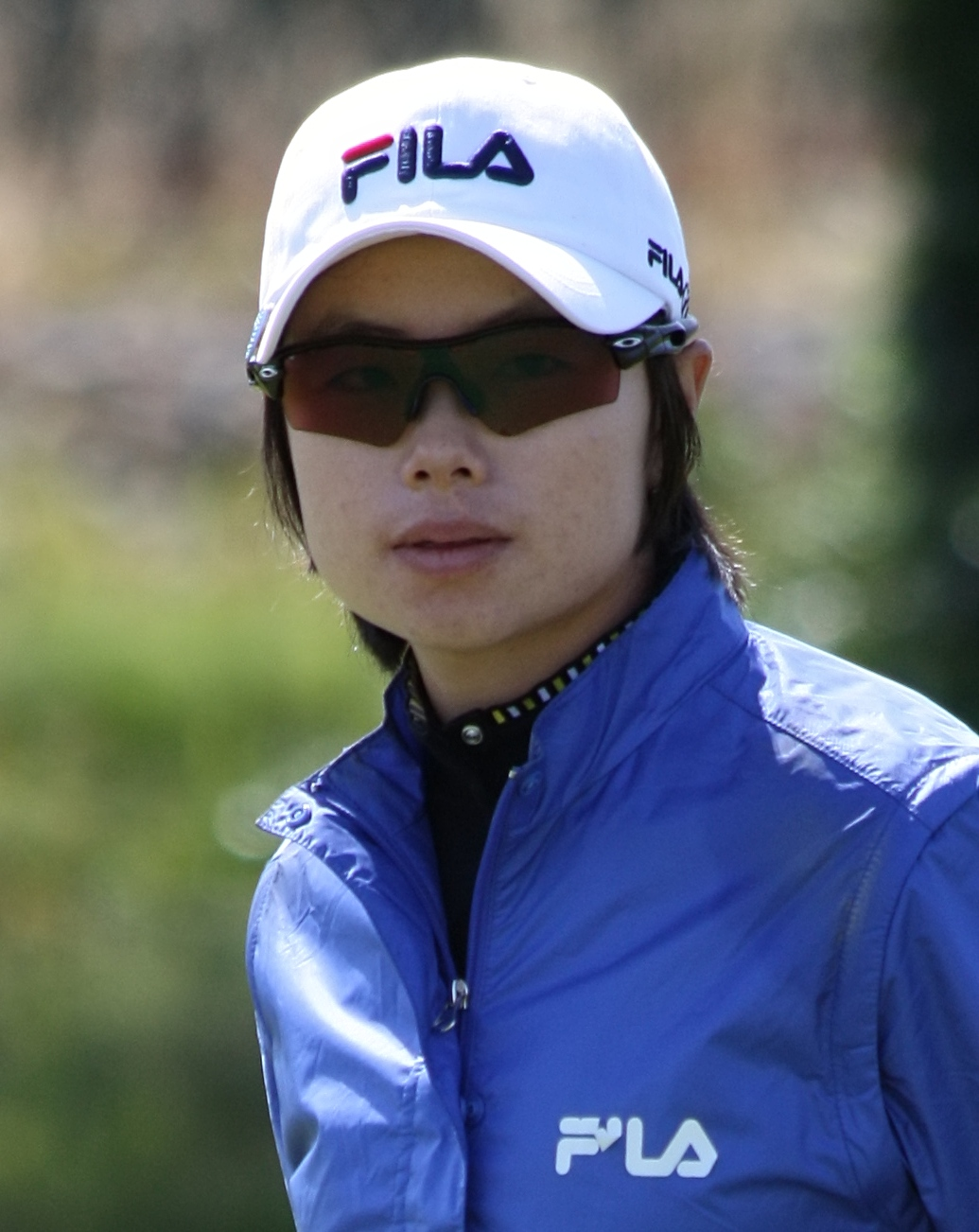
- Ji at the 2009 Women's British Open

Personal information
- Nationality: South Korea
- Born: 13 May 1986 (age 40) Gapyeong, South Korea
- Height: 5 ft 4 in (1.63 m)

Career
- Sport: Golf
- College: Chung-Ang University
- Turned professional: 2004
- Former tours: LPGA Tour (joined 2007); KLPGA Tour (joined 2004)
- Professional wins: 10

Number of wins by tour
- LPGA Tour: 6
- LPGA of Korea Tour: 2
- Ladies Asian Golf Tour: 2

Best results in LPGA major championships (wins: 1)
- Chevron Championship: T11: 2012
- Women's PGA C'ship: T2: 2012
- U.S. Women's Open: Won: 2009
- Women's British Open: T3: 2008
- Evian Championship: T8: 2015

Ji Eun-hee (Korean: 지은희; born 13 May 1986), also known as Eun-Hee Ji, is a South Korean professional golfer who plays on the U.S.-based LPGA Tour. She is also a member of the South Korean KLPGA. She was born in Gapyeong, South Korea.

== LPGA career ==
Ji joined the LPGA Tour in 2007 and recorded two top-10 finishes in just four events played, including runner-up at the Hana Bank-KOLON Championship. She made her first appearance in a major championship at the 2007 Women's British Open and finished in 5th place.

In 2008, Ji claimed her first LPGA win at the Wegmans LPGA, with a come-from-behind, two-stroke victory over Norwegian star Suzann Pettersen.

In 2009, she made a 20-foot (6 m) birdie on the 72nd hole of the U.S. Women's Open to win by one stroke. As with the 2008 Wegmans, this was a come-from-behind victory. Trailing Cristie Kerr, Ji overcame a double bogey on the 10th and birdied the 13th, 14th and 18th holes.

In 2012, Ji finished tied for second in the LPGA Championship. She had been leading the tournament going into the final round.

Ji retired following the 2025 season.

== Controversy ==
After Ji won the 2008 Wegmans LPGA, she gave her acceptance speech with the help of a translator. Some say this sparked the proposed "English only" requirement by the LPGA. Ji later commented that she felt the proposed requirement may have targeted her and that in the future she would "pay more attention to improving my English." Over a year later after winning the U.S. Women's Open, she again used a translator for her acceptance speech.

== Professional wins (10) ==
=== LPGA Tour (6) ===
Legend
Major championships (1)
Other LPGA Tour (5)

No.	Date	Tournament	Winning score	To par	Margin of victory	Runner(s)-up
1	22 Jun 2008	Wegmans LPGA	70-71-64-67=272	−16	2 strokes	(Norway) Suzann Pettersen
2	12 Jul 2009	U.S. Women's Open	71-72-70-71=284	E	1 stroke	(United States) Candie Kung
3	22 Oct 2017	Swinging Skirts LPGA Taiwan Championship	66-71-69-65=271	−17	6 strokes	(New Zealand) Lydia Ko
4	25 Mar 2018	Kia Classic	70-68-67-67=272	−16	2 strokes	(United States) Cristie Kerr (United States) Lizette Salas
5	20 Jan 2019	Diamond Resorts Tournament of Champions	65-69-66-70=270	−14	2 strokes	(South Korea) Mirim Lee
6	29 May 2022	Bank of Hope LPGA Match-Play	3 and 2			(Japan) Ayaka Furue

=== KLPGA Tour (2) ===
- 2007 (2) Phoenix Park Classic, KB Star Tour

=== Ladies Asian Golf Tour (2) ===
- 2006 (2) Macao Open, Malaysia Open

== Major championships ==
=== Wins (1) ===
Year	Championship	Winning score	Margin	Runner-up
2009	U.S. Women's Open	E (71-72-70-71=284)	1 stroke	(United States) Candie Kung

=== Results timeline ===
Results not in chronological order.

Tournament	2007	2008	2009	2010	2011	2012
Chevron Championship		CUT	T36	T75	T25	T11
U.S. Women's Open		T42	1	T39	T27	CUT
Women's PGA Championship		T29	T23	CUT	T43	T2
Women's British Open	T5	T3	DQ	CUT	T37	T53

Tournament	2013	2014	2015	2016	2017	2018	2019	2020	2021	2022	2023	2024
Chevron Championship	T48	T29	T29	T32	T47	CUT	T26	T44	T63	T39	T23	CUT
U.S. Women's Open	T61	T28	CUT	T3	T13	T17	T39	CUT	CUT	T15	CUT	
Women's PGA Championship	T22	T30	CUT	T64	T68	T33	CUT	T18	T58	T10	T61	CUT
The Evian Championship^	T37	T61	T8	T48	T18	T24	T25	NT	T54	42	T20	
Women's British Open	T25	T5	CUT	T50	T69	CUT	CUT		T42	T22	T61	

Win
Top 10
Did not play

CUT = missed the half-way cut
DQ = disqualified
NT = no tournament
"T" = tied

=== Summary ===
Tournament	Wins	2nd	3rd	Top-5	Top-10	Top-25	Events	Cuts made
Chevron Championship	0	0	0	0	0	3	17	14
U.S. Women's Open	1	0	1	2	2	4	16	11
Women's PGA Championship	0	1	0	1	2	6	17	13
The Evian Championship	0	0	0	0	1	5	10	10
Women's British Open	0	0	1	3	3	5	16	11
Totals	1	1	2	6	8	23	76	59

- Most consecutive cuts made – 12 (2012 British Open – 2015 ANA)
- Longest streak of top-10s – 1 (eight times)

== Team appearances ==
Professional

- Lexus Cup (representing Asia team): 2008
- World Cup (representing South Korea): 2008
