= Sunningdale Golf Club =

Golf club in Berkshire, England

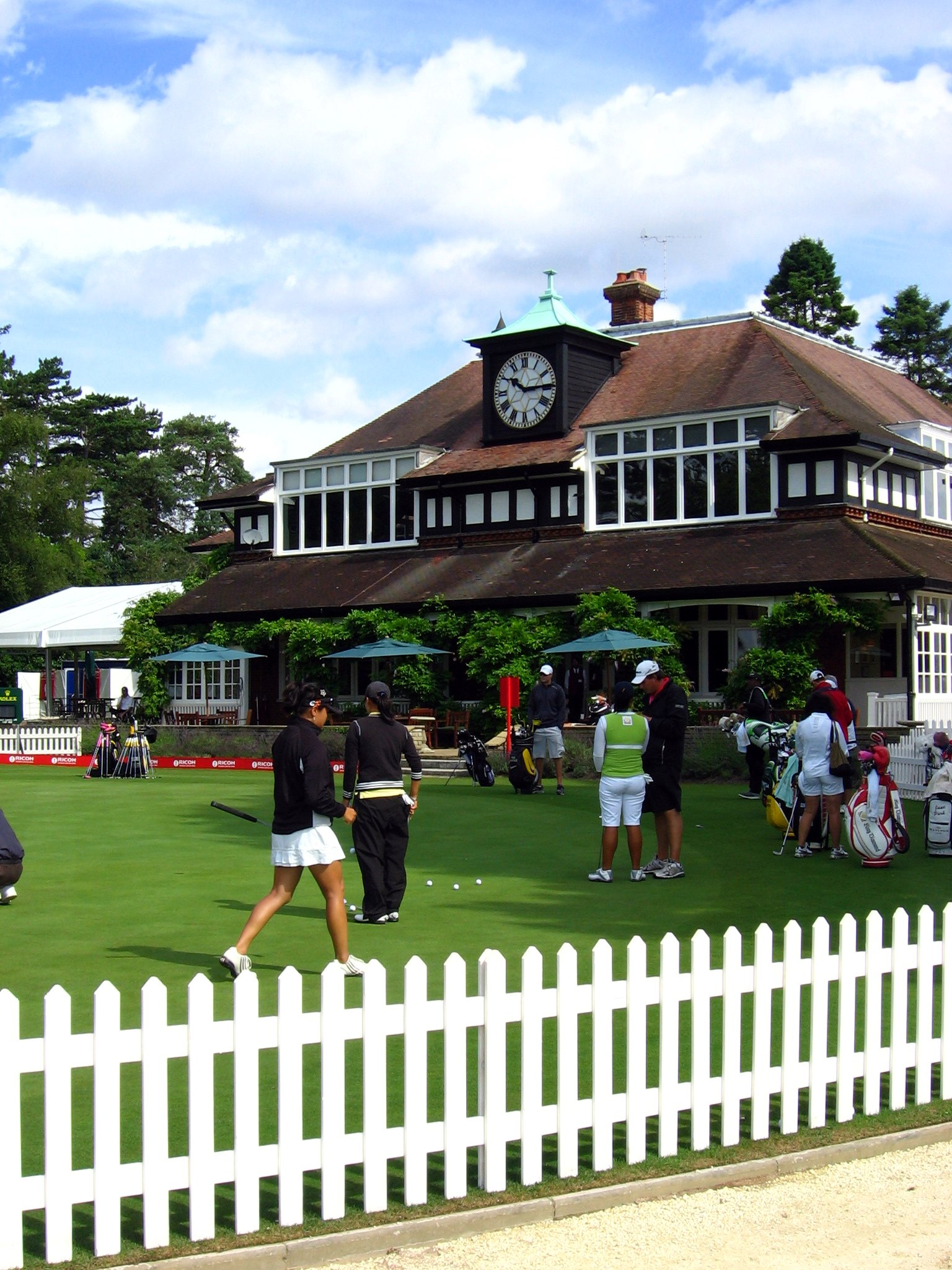
- Sunningdale GC clubhouse in 2008

- Location in England
- 51°23′17″N 0°37′52″W

Club information
- Location: Sunningdale, Berkshire, England
- Established: 1900, 126 years ago
- Type: Private
- Tota holes: 36
- Tournaments: Senior Open Championship; Women's British Open; British Masters; Walker Cup; Curtis Cup; Sunningdale Foursomes; International Final Qualifying (Europe) for The Open Championship
- Website: sunningdale-golfclub.co.uk

Old Course
- Designed by: Willie Park Jr. (opened 1901)
- Par: 70
- Length: 6,627 yards (6,060 m)
- Course rating: 72
- Course record: 62, Nick Faldo, Shane Lowry, Stephen Dodd

New Course
- Designed by: Harry Colt (opened 1923)
- Par: 70
- Length: 6,729 yards (6,153 m)
- Course rating: 73
- Course record: 62, Graeme Storm

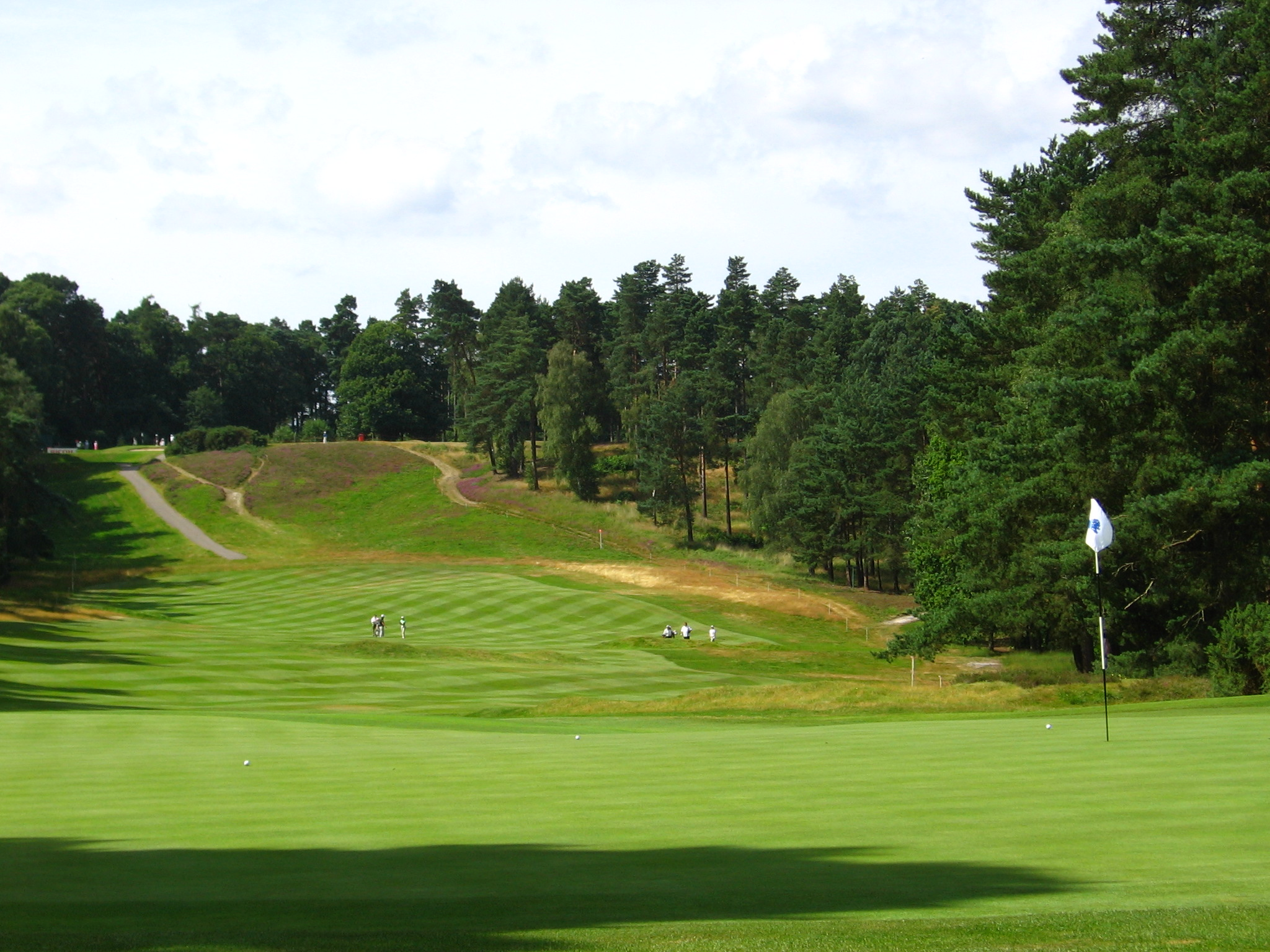
10th fairway of the Old Course, as seen from the green in 2008

Sunningdale Golf Club is a golf club in Sunningdale, Berkshire, England, located approximately 30 miles (50 km) west-southwest of London.

Sunningdale Golf Club was founded in 1900 and has two eighteen hole golf courses: the Old Course, designed by Willie Park Jr., and the New Course, designed by Harry Colt, which opened in 1923.

Sunningdale has hosted many prestigious events in golf, including the British Masters, Walker Cup, Women's British Open, and The Senior Open Championship. From 2004 to 2013, Europe's International Final Qualifying tournament for The Open Championship was held over both the Old and New courses at Sunningdale. It hosted the Seniors Amateur Championship in 2017.

== History ==
Sunningdale Golf Club was founded in 1900 on Chobham Common, on land owned by St. John's College, Cambridge. Its first Secretary was Harry Colt, who went on to design golf courses of international renown, such as the New Course at Sunningdale, Ealing, and Swinley Forest. Colt was highly influential in the creation of the Pine Valley Golf Club in New Jersey, widely acknowledged as one of the best golf courses in the world. The original 18-hole course, set in a heathland area, with sandy subsoil amid mixed treed foliage, was designed by Willie Park Jr., and was ready for play in 1901. It was also among the first successful courses located away from the seaside, as many people had thought at the time that turf would not grow well in such regions.

From the start, Sunningdale was well regarded and has hosted many important events. Examples include News of the World Match Play in 1903, 1907, 1912, and 1922; several stagings of the British Masters in the 1940s and 1950s; the 1974–79 Colgate European Open; the 1987 Walker Cup; the 1985, 1986, 1988, and 1992 European Open and the 1997, 2001, 2004, and 2008 Women's British Open. The Open Championship, International Final Qualifying has been held annually over the Old and New Courses since 2004. It was also the venue of the 2009 Senior British Open Championship, which was won by Loren Roberts. It hosted the Senior Open Championship again in July 2015, the winner being Marco Dawson. Bobby Jones had great fondness for Sunningdale. He scored 66-68 over it during qualifying for the 1926 British Open, with the 66 consisting of 33 full strokes and 33 putts, with every hole played in either 3 or 4; this has sometimes been described as the perfect round of golf. Jones said afterwards: "I wish I could take this course home with me." The original course is now called the Old Course, with the club having opened the New Course in 1923; it is also excellent and was designed by Harry Colt.

Colt was also the first secretary of Sunningdale, and recollections of his days at the club are described in Sheridan of Sunningdale, a unique history of the early years of Sunningdale, which was written in 1967 by Jimmy Sheridan, caddie master at Sunningdale for 56 years from 1910. The book is available on Kindle.

The club's first professional was Jack White, winner of the 1904 Open Championship, played at Royal St. George's. The course record on the Old Course is 62, jointly held by Nick Faldo at the 1986 European Open and Shane Lowry in the first round of Open Championship qualifying in 2010. Graeme Storm holds the course record on the New Course, a 62 recorded during the Open Championship, International Final Qualifying, Europe, 2009.

In the final round of the 2004 Women's British Open at Sunningdale (Old), eventual winner, English professional Karen Stupples began her round with an eagle followed by an albatross on the two opening par-5 holes. This score of five under par after only two holes is believed to be a world record at any level of competition.

Like many golf courses in Britain, Sunningdale is dog-friendly; canines are very welcome to accompany their owners on the course, provided they can conduct themselves reasonably. Halfway on the course is a refreshment hut known for its sausages and other victuals.

== Tournaments ==
=== Senior Open Championship ===
Year	Winner	Country	Score
**2009**	Loren Roberts	United States	268 (−12)
**2015**	Marco Dawson	United States	264 (−16)
**2021**	Stephen Dodd	Wales	267 (−13)
**2025**	Pádraig Harrington	Ireland	264 (−16)

=== Women's British Open ===
Year	Winner	Country	Score
1997	Karrie Webb	Australia	269 (−19)
**2001**	Se Ri Pak	South Korea	277 (−11)
**2004**	Karen Stupples	England	269 (−19)
**2008**	Jiyai Shin	South Korea	270 (−18)

=== British Masters ===
Year	Winner	Country	Score
1948	Norman Von Nida	Australia	272
1953	Harry Bradshaw	Ireland	272
1960	Jimmy Hitchcock	England	275
1968	Peter Thomson	Australia	274

=== Colgate European Open ===
Year	Winner	Country	Score
1976	Hisako "Chako" Higuchi	Japan	284
1977	Judy Rankin	United States	281
1978	Nancy Lopez	United States	289
1979	Nancy Lopez	United States	282

=== European Open ===
Year	Winner	Country	Score
1982	Manuel Piñero	Spain	266
1983	Isao Aoki	Japan	274
1984	Gordon Brand Jnr	Scotland	270
1985	Bernhard Langer	West Germany	269
1986	Greg Norman	Australia	269
1988	Ian Woosnam	Wales	260
1990	Peter Senior	Australia	267
1992	Nick Faldo	England	262

Bolded years signify major championship

== In popular culture ==
- The course is the site of the murder in "The Sunningdale Mystery", one of the short stories in Partners in Crime, a collection by Agatha Christie.
- James Bond and Bill Tanner play a round of golf on the New Course in the opening chapter of the 1968 James Bond continuation novel, Colonel Sun, written by Kingsley Amis under the pseudonym, "Robert Markham".
