= Royal Lytham & St Annes Golf Club =

Golf course in Lancashire, England

Royal Lytham & St. Annes Golf Club
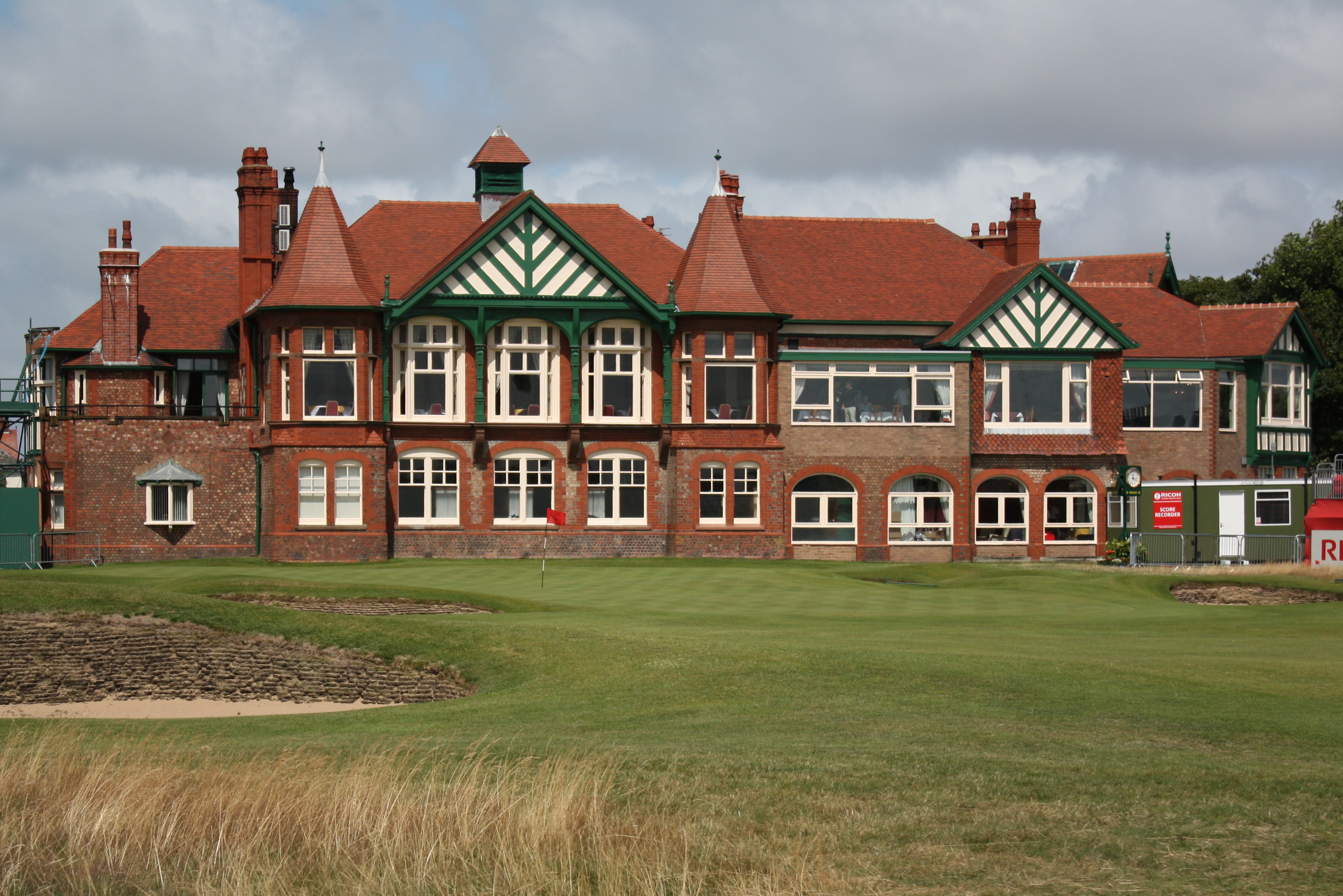
- Clubhouse in July 2009

- Location in the United Kingdom Location in England Location in the Borough of Fylde Location in Lytham St Annes
- 53.7496°N 3.0178°W

Club information
- Location: Lytham St Annes, Lancashire, England
- Established: 1886; 140 years ago
- Type: Private
- Total holes: 18
- Tournaments: Lytham Trophy; The Open Championship (11 times), The Amateur (1935,1955,1986), Dunlop Masters (1970), Senior Open Championship (1991~1994, 2019), Women's British Open (5 times)
- Website: royallytham.org
- Designed by: George Lowe; Harry Colt (1919 redesign)
- Par: 70
- Length: 7,118 yards (6,509 m)

Royal Lytham & St Annes Golf Club in Lytham St Annes, Lancashire, England, is one of the courses in the Open Championship rotation. The Women's British Open has also been played on the course five times: once prior to being designated a major championship by the LPGA Tour, and four times since. It most recently hosted the Women's Open in 2026.

== History ==
Lytham & St Annes Golf Club was founded in 1886 and the present course constructed in 1897. The club was bestowed with its "Royal" title by George V shortly before it hosted its first Open Championship in 1926. The clubhouse celebrated its centenary in 1998. It is one of the premier links courses in the world, host to eleven Open Championships, two Ryder Cups and numerous other major tournaments including the Women's and Seniors Open Championships.

There are 167 bunkers on the course lining the fairways and surrounding the greens. It is a challenging course which demands shot accuracy from its players.

== The Open Championship ==
The Open Championship has been held eleven times at Royal Lytham & St. Annes and is scheduled to return in 2028.

Year	Winner	Score					Winner's share (£)
Year	Winner	R1	R2	R3	R4	Total	Winner's share (£)
1926	(United States) Bobby Jones (a) ^{1st}	72	72	73	74	291	Am (75)
1952	(South Africa) Bobby Locke ^{3rd}	69	71	74	73	287 (−1)	300
1958	(Australia) Peter Thomson ^{4th}	66	72	67	73	278 (−6)^{PO}	1,000
1963	(New Zealand) Bob Charles	68	72	66	71	277 (−7)^{PO}	1,500
1969	(England) Tony Jacklin	68	70	70	72	280 (−4)	4,250
1974	(South Africa) Gary Player ^{3rd}	69	68	75	70	282 (−2)	5,500
1979	(Spain) Seve Ballesteros ^{1st}	73	65	75	70	283 (−1)	15,000
1988	(Spain) Seve Ballesteros ^{3rd}	67	71	70	65	273 (−11)	80,000
1996	(United States) Tom Lehman	67	67	64	73	271 (−13)	200,000
2001	(United States) David Duval	69	73	65	67	274 (−10)	600,000
2012	(South Africa) Ernie Els ^{2nd}	67	70	68	68	273 (–7)	900,000

- Note: For multiple winners of The Open Championship, superscript ordinal identifies which in their respective careers.

(a) denotes amateur

== Women's British Open ==
The Women's British Open, officially known as the Women's Open Championship, has been held five times at Royal Lytham & St. Annes:

Year	Winner	Score	Winner's share (US$)
1998	(United States) Sherri Steinhauer ^{1st}	**292** (+4)	98,162
**2003**	(Sweden) Annika Sörenstam	**278** (−10)	254,880
**2006**	(United States) Sherri Steinhauer ^{3rd}	**281** (−7)	305,440
**2009**	(Scotland) Catriona Matthew	**285** (−3)	335,000
**2018**	(England) Georgia Hall	**271** (−17)	490,000
**2026**	(Japan) Shiho Kuwaki	**279** (−5)	1,500,000

Notes

- For multiple winners of the Women's Open, superscript ordinal identifies which in their respective careers.
- Years in **bold** signify editions that were recognised as major championships by the LPGA (2001–present).
  Since its inception in 1979, the Women's British Open has always been a major on the Ladies European Tour.

== Scorecard ==
Royal Lytham & St. Annes Golf Club
Tee	Rating/Slope	1	2	3	4	5	6	7	8	9	Out	10	11	12	13	14	15	16	17	18	In	Total
2012 Open	Championship	205	481	478	392	219	492	592	416	165	3440	387	598	198	355	444	462	336	453	413	3646	7086
Blue	M:76.5 / 152	206	481	477	391	218	494	589	417	164	3437	385	601	196	357	443	464	358	467	410	3681	7118
Par	Championship	3	4	4	4	3	4	5	4	3	34	4	5	3	4	4	4	4	4	4	36	70
Red	M:74.3 / 147	198	424	457	381	188	494	569	396	156	3263	334	540	187	340	436	455	351	432	393	3468	6731
Green	M:72.5 / 139	174	399	432	371	170	474	539	389	144	3092	320	465	157	324	429	446	343	413	371	3268	6360
Par	Men's	3	4	4	4	3	5	5	4	3	35	4	5	3	4	4	4	4	4	4	36	71
Orange	W:76.4 / 148	169	375	418	357	147	408	512	311	137	2834	307	391	151	275	418	432	333	404	309	3020	5854
Par	Women's	3	4	4	5	3	5	5	4	3	36	4	5	3	4	5	5	4	5	4	39	75

- The 6th hole was a par 5 in previous Opens (1969-2001)

Lengths of the course for The Open Championship (since 1950):

- 2012: 7,086 yards (6,479 m), par 70
- 2001: 6,905 yards (6,314 m), par 71
- 1996: 6,892 yards (6,302 m), par 71
- 1988: 6,857 yards (6,270 m), par 71
- 1979: 6,822 yards (6,238 m), par 71
- 1974: 6,822 yards (6,238 m), par 71
- 1969: 6,848 yards (6,262 m), par 71
- 1963: 6,757 yards (6,179 m), par 70
- 1958: 6,635 yards (6,067 m)
- 1952: 6,657 yards (6,087 m)

== See also ==
- List of golf clubs granted Royal status
