= 2007 Women's British Open =

Coordinates: 56.3433°N 2.8028°W

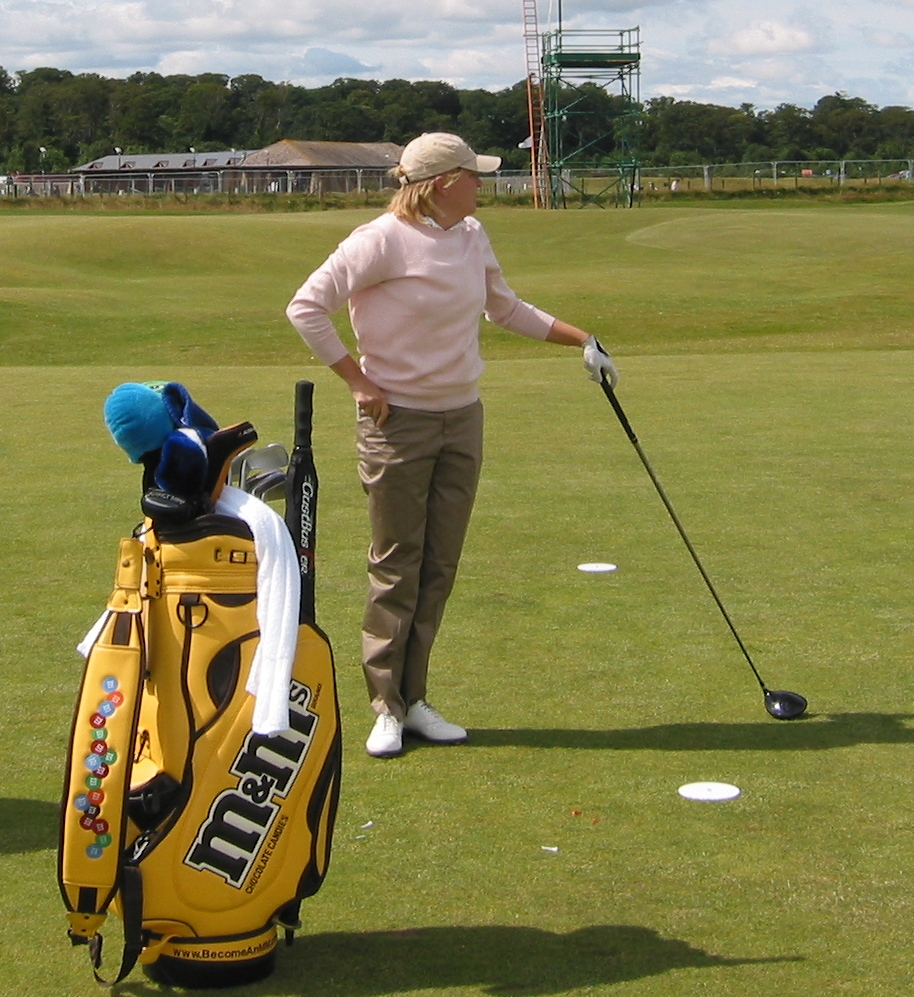
- Mhairi McKay during practice round

Tournament information
- Dates: 2–5 August 2007
- Location: St Andrews, Fife, Scotland
- Course: Old Course at St Andrews
- Organized by: Ladies' Golf Union
- Tours: LPGA Tour; Ladies European Tour

Statistics
- Par: 73
- Length: 6,638 yards (6,070 m)
- Field: 149 players, 69 after cut
- Cut: 151 (+5)
- Prize fund: $2,000,000 €1,478,135
- Winner's share: $320,512 €236,880

Champion
- (Mexico) Lorena Ochoa
- 287 (−5)

Location in Scotland

The 2007 Women's British Open was the 31st Women's British Open, held 2–5 August at the Old Course at St Andrews in Fife, Scotland. It was the seventh as a major championship on the LPGA Tour and the first-ever women's professional event at the Old Course.

Lorena Ochoa shot a bunker-free and bogey-free 67 (−6) in the opening round and led wire-to-wire to win the first of her two major titles, four strokes ahead of runners-up Maria Hjorth and Jee Young Lee.

Prior to Ochoa, the last to win a first major at the Old Course was Tony Lema, 43 years earlier in 1964. This was the first Women's British Open sponsored by Ricoh, the previous twenty were by Weetabix.

== Course ==
Hole	Name	Yards	Par	Hole	Name	Yards	Par
1	Burn	376	4	10	Bobby Jones	340	4
2	Dyke	400	4	11	High (In)	160	3
3	Cartgate (Out)	370	4	12	Heathery (In)	314	4
4	Ginger Beer	406	4	13	Hole O'Cross (In)	407	4
5	Hole O'Cross (Out)	514	5	14	Long	523	5
6	Heathery (Out)	369	4	15	Cartgate (In)	414	4
7	High (Out)	353	4	16	Corner of the Dyke	381	4
8	Short	154	3	17	Road	453	5
9	End	347	4	18	Tom Morris	357	4
Out		3,289	36	In		3,349	37
				Total		6,638	73

- The Road Hole, No. 17, was played as a par 5 for this championship, and was the easiest hole relative to par.

== Round summaries ==
=== First round ===
Thursday, 2 August 2007

Place	Player	Score	To par
1	(Mexico) Lorena Ochoa	67	−6
T2	(Sweden) Louise Friberg	69	−4
T2	(South Korea) Inbee Park	69	−4
T4	(England) Rebecca Hudson	70	−3
T4	(Japan) Ai Miyazato	70	−3
T6	(Australia) Joanne Mills	71	−2
T6	(South Korea) Meena Lee	71	−2
T6	(United States) Brittany Lincicome	71	−2
T6	(United States) Wendy Ward	71	−2
T10	(Italy) Tullia Calzavara	72	−1
T10	(France) Karine Icher	72	−1
T10	(South Korea) In-Kyung Kim	72	−1
T10	(Taiwan) Candie Kung	72	−1
T10	(France) Virginie Lagoutte-Clément	72	−1
T10	(South Korea) Lee Jee-young	72	−1
T10	(South Korea) Sarah Lee	72	−1
T10	(South Korea) Min Na-on	72	−1
T10	(Sweden) Catrin Nilsmark	72	−1
T10	(Sweden) Annika Sörenstam	72	−1
T10	(United States) Sherri Steinhauer	72	−1

=== Second round ===
Friday, 3 August 2007

Place	Player	Score	To par
1	(Mexico) Lorena Ochoa	67-73=140	−6
T2	(Scotland) Catriona Matthew	73-68=141	−5
T2	(United States) Wendy Ward	71-70=141	−5
T4	(Japan) Yuri Fudoh	74-69=143	−3
T4	(England) Rebecca Hudson	70-73=143	−3
T4	(France) Karine Icher	72-71=143	−3
T4	(Sweden) Annika Sörenstam	72-71=143	−3
T4	(United States) Sherri Steinhauer	72-71=143	−3
9	(South Korea) Ji Eun-hee	73-71=144	−2
T10	(Sweden) Louise Friberg	69-76=145	−1
T10	(Sweden) Sophie Gustafson	73-72=145	−1
T10	(France) Virginie Lagoutte-Clément	72-73=145	−1
T10	(South Korea) Lee Jee-young	72-73=145	−1

Amateurs: Mozo (+1), Reid (+2), Choi (+4), Bell (+5), Edwards (+5), Nordqvist (+5), Smith (+5), Watson (+5), Ciganda (+7), McVeigh (+8)

=== Third round ===
Saturday, 4 August 2007

Place	Player	Score	To par
1	(Mexico) Lorena Ochoa	67-73-73=213	−6
2	(Sweden) Linda Wessberg	74-73-72=219	E
T3	(Sweden) Maria Hjorth	75-73-72=220	+1
T3	(France) Karine Icher	72-71-77=220	+1
T3	(South Korea) Lee Jee-young	72-73-75=220	+1
T3	(Sweden) Annika Sörenstam	72-71-77=220	+1
T7	(South Korea) Ji Eun-hee	73-71-77=221	+2
T7	(Scotland) Catriona Matthew	73-68-80=221	+2
T7	(South Korea) Se-ri Pak	73-73-75=221	+2
T7	(United States) Reilley Rankin	73-74-74=221	+2
T7	(United States) Wendy Ward	71-70-80=221	+2

=== Final round ===
Sunday, 5 August 2007

Place	Player	Score	To par	Money ($)
1	(Mexico) Lorena Ochoa	67-73-73-74=287	−5	320,512
T2	(Sweden) Maria Hjorth	75-73-72-71=291	−1	170,272
T2	(South Korea) Lee Jee-young	72-73-75-71=291	−1	170,272
4	(United States) Reilley Rankin	73-74-74-71=292	E	110,176
T5	(South Korea) Ji Eun-hee	73-71-77-72=293	+1	84,135
T5	(South Korea) Se-ri Pak	73-73-75-72=293	+1	84,135
T7	(United States) Paula Creamer	73-75-74-72=294	+2	61,098
T7	(Scotland) Catriona Matthew	73-68-80-73=294	+2	61,098
T7	(Japan) Miki Saiki	76-70-81-67=294	+2	61,098
T7	(Sweden) Linda Wessberg	74-73-72-75=294	+2	61,098

Amateurs: Reid (+4), Smith (+9), Choi (+11), Bell (+12), Watson (+12), Mozo (+13), Nordqvist (+14), Edwards (+20)

==== Scorecard ====
Final round

Hole	1	2	3	4	5	6	7	8	9	10	11	12	13	14	15	16	17	18
Par	4	4	4	4	5	4	4	3	4	4	3	4	4	5	4	4	5	4
(Mexico) Ochoa	−6	−6	−6	−6	−7	−8	−8	−7	−8	−8	−7	−7	−7	−7	−6	−6	−5	−5
(Sweden) Hjorth	+1	E	E	+1	E	−1	−1	−1	−1	−1	−1	−1	E	−1	−1	−1	−1	−1
(South Korea) Lee	+1	+1	+1	E	−1	−1	−1	−1	−2	−2	−2	−1	E	−1	−2	−1	−1	−1
(United States) Rankin	+2	+2	+2	+2	+1	+1	E	E	−1	−1	−1	E	E	E	−1	−1	E	E
(South Korea) Ji	+3	+3	+3	+3	+2	+2	+2	+2	+2	+2	+1	+2	+2	+2	+2	+2	+1	+1
(South Korea) Pak	+2	+2	+2	+2	+2	+2	+2	+1	+1	+1	+2	+1	+1	+1	E	+1	+1	+1
(Sweden) Wessberg	E	E	−1	−1	−1	−1	−1	−1	−2	−3	−2	−2	−2	E	+1	+2	+2	+2

Cumulative tournament scores, relative to par

Birdie	Bogey	Double bogey
