= 2003 Women's British Open =

Coordinates: 53.7495°N 3.0180°W

Tournament information
- Dates: 31 July – 3 August 2003
- Location: Lancashire, England
- Course: Royal Lytham & St Annes; Golf Club
- Organized by: Ladies' Golf Union
- Tours: LPGA Tour; Ladies European Tour

Statistics
- Par: 72
- Length: 6,308 yards (5,768 m)
- Field: 144 players, 68 after cut
- Cut: 147 (+3)
- Prize fund: $1,600,000 €1,435,782
- Winner's share: $254,880 €228,720

Champion
- (Sweden) Annika Sörenstam
- 278 (−10)

Location in England

The 2003 Women's British Open was held 31 July to 3 August at Royal Lytham & St Annes Golf Club in Lancashire, England. It was the 27th edition of the Women's British Open, and the third as a major championship on the LPGA Tour. TNT Sports and ABC Sports televised the event in the United States and BBC Sport in the United Kingdom.

Annika Sörenstam won the sixth of her ten major titles, one stroke ahead of runner-up Se-Ri Pak, the 2001 champion. The victory completed the career grand slam for Sörenstam.

== Course layout ==
Hole	1	2	3	4	5	6	7	8	9	Out	10	11	12	13	14	15	16	17	18	In	Total
Yards	198	390	410	357	170	474	542	389	144	3,074	311	465	151	324	418	455	333	406	371	3,234	6,308
Par	3	4	4	4	3	5	5	4	3	35	4	5	3	4	4	5	4	4	4	37	72

== Round summaries ==
=== First round ===
Thursday, 31 July 2003

Place	Player	Score	To par
T1	(United States) Wendy Ward	67	−5
T1	(Australia) Karrie Webb	67	−5
3	(Sweden) Annika Sörenstam	68	−4
T4	(Canada) Lorie Kane	69	−3
T4	(Denmark) Christina Kuld	69	−3
T4	(South Korea) Se-ri Pak	69	−3
T4	(Philippines) Jennifer Rosales	69	−3
T4	(England) Georgina Simpson	69	−3
T4	(England) Karen Stupples	69	−3
T4	(Australia) Shani Waugh	69	−3

=== Second round ===
Friday, 1 August 2003

Place	Player	Score	To par
1	(United States) Heather Bowie	70-66=136	−8
T2	(South Korea) Se-ri Pak	69-69=138	−6
T2	(United States) Wendy Ward	67-71=138	−6
T4	(Japan) Akiko Fukushima	72-67=139	−5
T4	(France) Patricia Meunier-Lebouc	70-69=139	−5
T4	(Mexico) Lorena Ochoa	74-65=139	−5
T4	(South Korea) Grace Park	74-65=139	−5
T4	(Australia) Karrie Webb	67-72=139	−5
T9	(United States) Michele Redman	71-69=140	−4
T9	(Sweden) Annika Sörenstam	68-72=140	−4

Amateurs: Serramià (+3), Keighley (+5), Brewerton (+6)

=== Third round ===
Saturday, 2 August 2003

Place	Player	Score	To par
1	(France) Patricia Meunier-Lebouc	70-69-67=206	−10
T2	(South Korea) Se-ri Pak	69-69-69=207	−9
T2	(United States) Wendy Ward	67-71-69=207	−9
4	(Sweden) Annika Sörenstam	68-72-68=208	−8
5	(Australia) Karrie Webb	67-72-70=209	−7
T6	(United States) Heather Bowie	70-66-74=210	−6
T6	(South Korea) Grace Park	74-65-71=210	−6
T8	(United States) Kelli Kuehne	73-69-69=211	−5
T8	(Spain) Paula Martí	71-70-70=211	−5
T10	(United States) Beth Daniel	74-71-67=212	−4
T10	(United States) Vicki Goetze-Ackerman	73-71-68=212	−4

=== Final round ===
Sunday, 3 August 2003

Place	Player	Score	To par	Money ($)
1	(Sweden) Annika Sörenstam	68-72-68-70=278	−10	254,880
2	(South Korea) Se-ri Pak	69-69-69-72=279	−9	159,300
T3	(South Korea) Grace Park	74-65-71-70=280	−8	99,563
T3	(Australia) Karrie Webb	67-72-70-71=280	−8	99,563
5	(France) Patricia Meunier-Lebouc	70-69-67-76=282	−6	71,685
T6	(United States) Vicki Goetze-Ackerman	73-71-68-71=283	−5	58,941
T6	(United States) Wendy Ward	67-71-69-76=283	−5	58,941
8	(Sweden) Sophie Gustafson	73-69-71-71=284	−4	50,976
9	(South Korea) Young Kim	73-70-72-70=285	−3	46,197
T10	(Taiwan) Candie Kung	73-71-69-73=286	−2	39,825
T10	(South Korea) Gloria Park	70-75-69-72=286	−2	39,825

Amateur: Serramià (+6)
