= Kathryn Imrie =

Scottish professional golfer (born 1967)

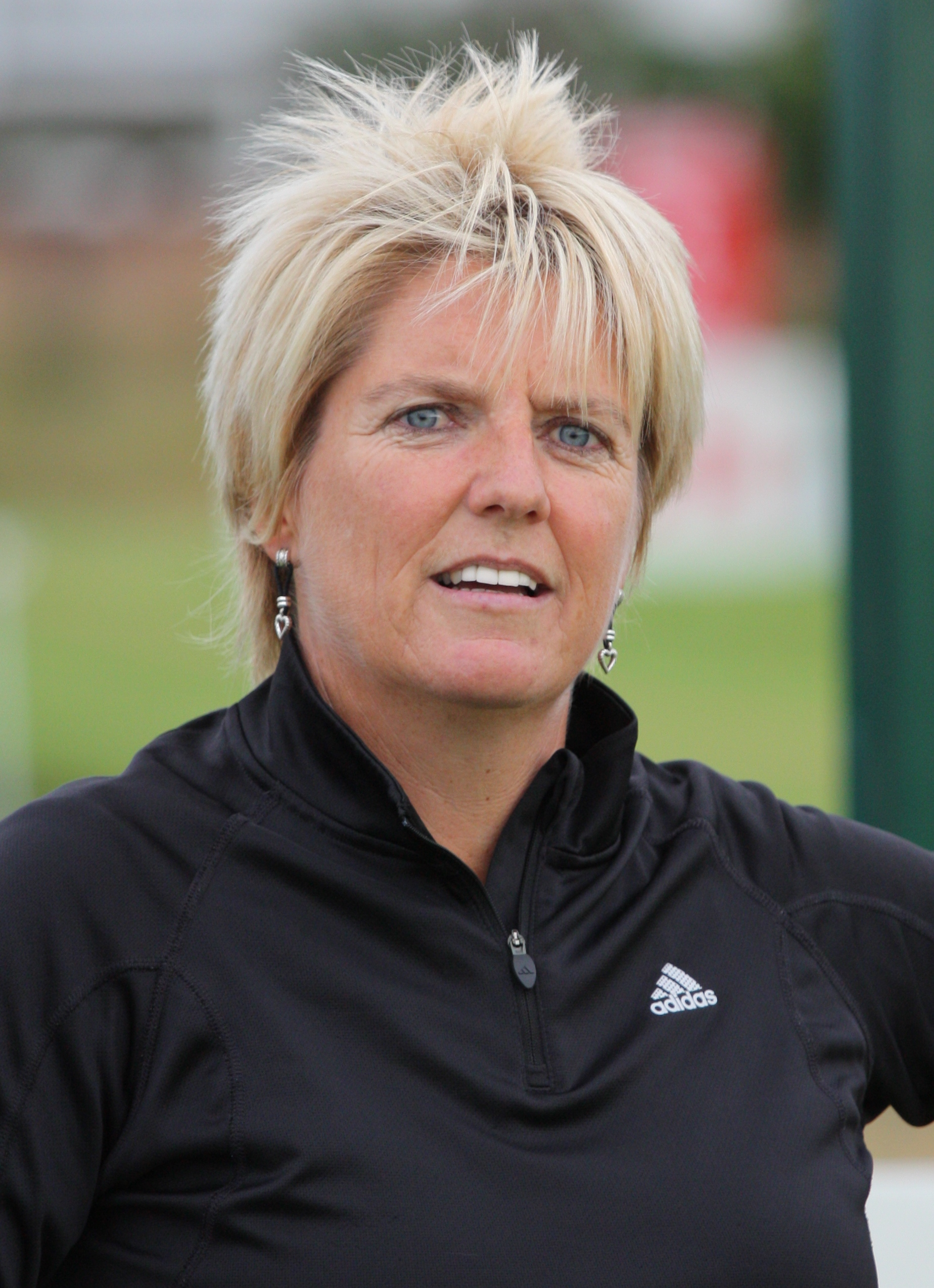
- Imrie at the 2009 Women's British Open

Personal information
- Full name: Kathryn Christine Marshall Imrie
- Nationality: Scotland
- Born: 8 June 1967 (age 59) Dundee, Scotland
- Height: 5 ft 3 in (1.60 m)

Career
- Sport: Golf
- College: University of Arizona
- Turned professional: 1990
- Former tours: Ladies European Tour; LPGA Tour
- Professional wins: 1

Number of wins by tour
- LPGA Tour: 1

Best results in LPGA major championships
- Chevron Championship: T16: 1997
- Women's PGA C'ship: T18: 1996
- U.S. Women's Open: T17: 2000
- du Maurier Classic: T23: 1996
- Women's British Open: T7: 2001

Kathryn Christine Imrie (born Kathryn Marshall 8 June 1967) is a Scottish professional golfer who played on the U.S.-based LPGA Tour and the Ladies European Tour.

== Early life and amateur career ==
In 1967, Marshall was born in Dundee, Scotland. She had a successful amateur career. She was the 1981 and 1985 Scottish Schools' champion, 1983-85 Scottish Youth's champion, and the 1983 Scottish Girls champion. She was the Scottish Junior Open Strokeplay Champion three times consecutively: in 1985, 1986, and 1987. She also was a member of the 1990 Curtis Cup team.

She played her collegiate golf at the University of Arizona where she was 1989 All-American.

== Professional career ==
In 1990, Marshall turned professional. She played on the Ladies European Tour from 1991 to 2008 and the LPGA Tour from 1993 to 2006. She won one LPGA event, the 1995 Jamie Farr Toledo Classic. She played on the 1996 European team in the Solheim Cup.

== Professional wins (1) ==
=== LPGA Tour wins (1) ===
No.	Date	Tournament	Winning score	Margin of victory	Runner-up
1	9 Jul 1995	Jamie Farr Toledo Classic	–8 (67-71-67=205)	1 stroke	(United States) Sherri Steinhauer

== Team appearances ==
Amateur

- European Lady Junior's Team Championship (representing Scotland): 1988
- European Ladies' Team Championship (representing Scotland): 1987, 1989
- Vagliano Trophy (representing Great Britain & Ireland): 1989 (winners)
- Curtis Cup (representing Great Britain & Ireland): 1990

Professional

- Solheim Cup (representing Europe): 1996
