= 2004 Women's British Open =

Coordinates: 51.388°N 0.631°W

Tournament information
- Dates: 29 July – 1 August 2004
- Location: Sunningdale, Berkshire, England
- Course(s): Sunningdale Golf Club; Old Course
- Organized by: Ladies' Golf Union
- Tour(s): LPGA Tour; Ladies European Tour

Statistics
- Par: 72
- Length: 6,392 yards (5,845 m)
- Field: 144 players, 69 after cut
- Cut: 146 (+2)
- Prize fund: $1,600,000 €1,260,726
- Winner's share: $290,880 €229,200

Champion
- (England) Karen Stupples
- 269 (−19)

Location in England

The 2004 Women's British Open was held 29 July to 1 August at Sunningdale Golf Club in Berkshire, England. It was the 28th edition of the Women's British Open, and the fourth as a major championship on the LPGA Tour. TNT Sports, ABC Sports and BBC Sport broadcast the event in the United States and the United Kingdom.

Karen Stupples won her only major, five shots ahead of runner-up Rachel Teske.

== Round summaries ==
=== First round ===
Thursday, 29 July 2004

Place	Player	Score	To par
1	(England) Karen Stupples	65	−7
2	(South Korea) Sarah Lee	67	−5
T3	(Finland) Minea Blomqvist	68	−4
T3	(United States) Natalie Gulbis	68	−4
T3	(Germany) Bettina Hauert	68	−4
T3	(Scotland) Catriona Matthew	68	−4
T3	(Sweden) Annika Sörenstam	68	−4
T8	(United States) Beth Daniel	69	−3
T8	(Canada) A. J. Eathorne	69	−3
T8	(South Korea) Seol-an Jeon	69	−3
T8	(United States) Cristie Kerr	69	−3
T8	(Mexico) Lorena Ochoa	69	−3
T8	(Scotland) Janice Moodie	69	−3
T8	(Australia) Nadina Taylor	69	−3

=== Second round ===
Friday, 30 July 2004

Place	Player	Score	To par
1	(England) Karen Stupples	65-70=135	−9
T2	(United States) Beth Daniel	69-69=138	−6
T2	(South Korea) Jeong Jang	70-68=138	−6
T2	(South Korea) Seol-an Jeon	69-69=138	−6
T5	(United States) Heather Bowie	70-69=139	−5
T5	(England) Laura Davies	70-69=139	−5
T5	(United States) Laura Diaz	70-69=139	−5
T5	(Mexico) Natalie Gulbis	68-71=139	−5
T5	(South Korea) Sarah Lee	67-72=139	−5
T5	(Spain) Paula Martí	73-66=139	−5
T5	(Sweden) Annika Sörenstam	68-71=139	−5
T5	(Sweden) Rachel Teske	70-69=139	−5

Amateurs: Stahle (−2), McKevitt (+9)

=== Third round ===
Saturday, 31 July 2004

Place	Player	Score	To par
T1	(United States) Heather Bowie	70-69-65=204	−12
T1	(Australia) Rachel Teske	70-69-65=204	−12
T3	(United States) Cristie Kerr	69-73-63=205	−11
T3	(England) Karen Stupples	65-70-70=205	−11
5	(Mexico) Lorena Ochoa	69-71-66=206	−10
6	(Spain) Paula Martí	73-66-68=207	−9
T7	(Finland) Minea Blomqvist	68-78-62=208	−8
T7	(England) Laura Davies	70-69-60=208	−8
T7	(South Korea) Seol-an Jeon	69-69-70=208	−8
T10	(United States) Beth Daniel	69-69-71=209	−7
T10	(South Korea) Sarah Lee	67-72-70=209	−7

=== Final round ===
Sunday, 1 August 2004

Place	Player	Score	To par	Money ($)
1	(England) Karen Stupples	65-70-70-64=269	−19	290,880
2	(Australia) Rachel Teske	70-69-65-70=274	−14	181,800
3	(United States) Heather Bowie	70-69-65-71=275	−13	127,260
4	(Mexico) Lorena Ochoa	69-71-66-70=276	−12	99,990
T5	(United States) Beth Daniel	69-69-71-68=277	−11	72,114
T5	(United States) Michele Redman	70-71-70-66=277	−11	72,114
T5	(Italy) Giulia Sergas	72-71-67-67=277	−11	72,114
T8	(Finland) Minea Blomqvist	68-78-62-70=278	−10	52,722
T8	(England) Laura Davies	70-69-69-70=278	−10	52,722
T8	(South Korea) Sarah Lee	67-72-70-69=278	−10	52,722

Amateur: Stahle (+2)
