= 2001 Open Championship =

Coordinates: 53.7495°N 3.0180°W

Tournament information
- Dates: 19–22 July 2001
- Location: Lytham St Annes, England
- Course: Royal Lytham & St Annes Golf Club
- Tour(s): European Tour; PGA Tour; Japan Golf Tour

Statistics
- Par: 71
- Length: 6,905 yards (6,314 m)
- Field: 156 players, 70 after cut
- Cut: 144 (+2)
- Prize fund: £3,300,000 €5,300,860 $4,720,650
- Winner's share: £600,000 €984,756 $858,300

Champion
- (United States) David Duval
- 274 (−10)

Location in England

The 2001 Open Championship was a men's major golf championship and the 130th Open Championship, held from 19 to 22 July at Royal Lytham & St Annes Golf Club in Lytham St Annes, England. David Duval won his only major championship, three strokes ahead of runner-up Niclas Fasth.

== Course layout ==
Royal Lytham & St Annes Golf Club

Hole	1	2	3	4	5	6	7	8	9	Out	10	11	12	13	14	15	16	17	18	In	Total
Yards	206	438	458	392	212	494	557	419	164	3,340	335	542	198	342	445	465	359	467	412	3,565	6,905
Par	3	4	4	4	3	5	5	4	3	35	4	5	3	4	4	4	4	4	4	36	71

Previous lengths of the course for The Open Championship (since 1950):

- 1996: 6,892 yards (6,302 m)
- 1988: 6,857 yards (6,270 m)
- 1979: 6,822 yards (6,238 m)
- 1974: 6,822 yards (6,238 m)
- 1969: 6,848 yards (6,262 m)
- 1963: 6,836 yards (6,251 m)
- 1958: 6,635 yards (6,067 m)
- 1952: 6,657 yards (6,087 m)

== Round summaries ==
=== First round ===
Thursday, 19 July 2001

Place	Player	Score	To par
1	(Scotland) Colin Montgomerie	65	−6
T2	(United States) Chris DiMarco	68	−3
T2	(United States) Brad Faxon	68	−3
T2	(Finland) Mikko Ilonen	68	−3
T5	(United States) Billy Andrade	69	−2
T5	(Australia) Stuart Appleby	69	−2
T5	(France) Alexandre Balicki	69	−2
T5	(Germany) Alex Čejka	69	−2
T5	(United States) David Duval	69	−2
T5	(Sweden) Niclas Fasth	69	−2
T5	(Sweden) Pierre Fulke	69	−2
T5	(United States) J. P. Hayes	69	−2
T5	(Spain) Miguel Ángel Jiménez	69	−2
T5	(United States) Billy Mayfair	69	−2
T5	(Republic of Ireland) Paul McGinley	69	−2
T5	(United States) Joe Ogilvie	69	−2
T5	(Spain) José María Olazábal	69	−2
T5	(England) Greg Owen	69	−2
T5	(Sweden) Jesper Parnevik	69	−2
T5	(England) Justin Rose	69	−2

=== Second round ===
Friday, 20 July 2001

Place	Player	Score	To par
1	(Scotland) Colin Montgomerie	65-70=135	−7
2	(Sweden) Pierre Fulke	69-67=136	−6
T3	(United States) Joe Ogilvie	69-68=137	−5
T3	(England) Greg Owen	69-68=137	−5
T3	(Sweden) Jesper Parnevik	69-68=137	−5
T6	(Germany) Alex Čejka	69-69=138	−4
T6	(Sweden) Niclas Fasth	69-69=138	−4
T6	(Argentina) Eduardo Romero	70-68=138	−4
T9	(United States) Billy Andrade	69-70=139	−3
T9	(Northern Ireland) Darren Clarke	70-69=139	−3
T9	(United States) Brad Faxon	68-71=139	−3
T9	(France) Raphaël Jacquelin	71-68=139	−3
T9	(United States) Mark O'Meara	70-69=139	−3
T9	(South Africa) Rory Sabbatini	70-69=139	−3
T9	(Republic of Ireland) Des Smyth	74-65=139	−3
T9	(United States) Tiger Woods	71-68=139	−3

Amateurs: Dixon (−1), Wilson (+5), Hoey (+7), Quinney (+7), Griffiths (+8), Kemp (+12).

=== Third round ===
Saturday, 21 July 2001

Place	Player	Score	To par
T1	(Germany) Alex Čejka	69-69-69=207	−6
T1	(United States) David Duval	69-73-65=207	−6
T1	(Germany) Bernhard Langer	71-69-67=207	−6
T1	(Wales) Ian Woosnam	72-68-67=207	−6
T5	(Northern Ireland) Darren Clarke	70-69-69=208	−5
T5	(Sweden) Pierre Fulke	69-67-72=208	−5
T5	(France) Raphaël Jacquelin	71-68-69=208	−5
T5	(Spain) Miguel Ángel Jiménez	69-72-67=208	−5
T5	(United States) Billy Mayfair	69-72-67=208	−5
T5	(Scotland) Colin Montgomerie	65-70-73=208	−5
T5	(United States) Joe Ogilvie	69-68-71=208	−5
T5	(Sweden) Jesper Parnevik	69-68-71=208	−5
T5	(Zimbabwe) Nick Price	73-67-68=208	−5

=== Final round ===
Sunday, 22 July 2001

Place	Player	Score	To par	Money (£)
1	(United States) David Duval	69-73-65-67=274	−10	600,000
2	(Sweden) Niclas Fasth	69-69-72-67=277	−7	360,000
T3	(Northern Ireland) Darren Clarke	70-69-69-70=278	−6	141,667
T3	(South Africa) Ernie Els	71-71-67-69=278	−6	141,667
T3	(Spain) Miguel Ángel Jiménez	69-72-67-70=278	−6	141,667
T3	(Germany) Bernhard Langer	71-69-67-71=278	−6	141,667
T3	(United States) Billy Mayfair	69-72-67-70=278	−6	141,667
T3	(Wales) Ian Woosnam	72-68-67-71=278	−6	141,667
T9	(Spain) Sergio García	70-72-67-70=279	−5	63,750
T9	(Finland) Mikko Ilonen	68-75-70-66=279	−5	63,750
T9	(Sweden) Jesper Parnevik	69-68-71-71=279	−5	63,750
T9	(United States) Kevin Sutherland	75-69-68-67=279	−5	63,750

Amateurs: Dixon (+1)

==== Scorecard ====
Final round

Hole	1	2	3	4	5	6	7	8	9	10	11	12	13	14	15	16	17	18
Par	3	4	4	4	3	5	5	4	3	4	5	3	4	4	4	4	4	4
(United States) Duval	−6	−6	−7	−7	−7	−8	−9	−9	−9	−9	−10	−9	−10	−10	−10	−10	−10	−10
(Sweden) Fasth	−4	−4	−5	−5	−5	−6	−7	−7	−7	−7	−8	−8	−8	−7	−7	−7	−7	−7
(Northern Ireland) Clarke	−5	−5	−4	−4	−4	−6	−6	−6	−6	−6	−7	−7	−7	−7	−7	−8	−6	−6
(South Africa) Els	−4	−4	−4	−3	−3	−3	−3	−3	−4	−4	−4	−4	−4	−5	−5	−5	−5	−6
(Spain) Jiménez	−6	−5	−5	−5	−5	−6	−6	−6	−6	−6	−7	−7	−8	−7	−6	−6	−6	−6
(Germany) Langer	−6	−6	−6	−6	−6	−6	−6	−6	−6	−6	−5	−5	−5	−6	−5	−6	−6	−6
(United States) Mayfair	−5	−5	−5	−5	−5	−6	−7	−7	−7	−7	−6	−6	−6	−6	−6	−6	−6	−6
(Wales) Woosnam	−5	−5	−4	−3	−3	−5	−5	−5	−5	−5	−6	−6	−7	−7	−6	−7	−6	−6
(Germany) Čejka	−6	−6	−5	−4	−1	−2	−2	−2	−2	−2	−3	−2	−2	−2	−2	−3	−4	−4

Cumulative tournament scores, relative to par
