= Johanna Head =

English golfer

Personal information
- Nationality: England
- Born: 28 February 1973 (age 53) Ascot, Berkshire, England
- Height: 1.70 m (5 ft 7 in)

Career
- Sport: Golf
- Turned professional: 1995
- Former tours: LPGA Tour (2001); Ladies European Tour (joined 1997)
- Professional wins: 3

Number of wins by tour
- Ladies Asian Golf Tour: 1

Best results in LPGA major championships
- Chevron Championship: T52: 2006
- Women's PGA C'ship: T41: 2007
- U.S. Women's Open: T20: 2004
- du Maurier Classic: DNP
- Women's British Open: T21: 2001

Johanna Head (born 28 February 1973) is an English professional golfer who played on the Ladies European Tour (LET) and the LPGA Tour. She competed as Johanna Mundy following her marriage to Terry Mundy, a caddie to professional golfer Ian Poulter.

Head was born in Ascot, Berkshire and her twin sister Samantha is also a professional golfer. She joined the Ladies European Tour in 1997 and won her first professional title in 1999, the Malaysian Open. Head then went on to win two unofficial tournaments: the Lalla Meryem Cup in 2002 and 2003.

Head led by three strokes going into the final round of the 2002 Wales WPGA Championship of Europe but posted a 79 in the final round and finished T6. She was runner-up at the 2002 Tenerife Ladies Open and the 1998 Compaq Open, ten strokes behind Annika Sörenstam.

Head first gained non-exempt status for the 2000 LPGA Tour, but played sparingly on the LPGA tour and mostly on the LET until in 2003 when she had fully exempt status and got in close to a full season on the LPGA Tour. Her best result on the LPGA Tour was sixth place at the 2005 Canadian Women's Open.

== Professional wins (3) ==
=== Ladies Asian Golf Tour wins (1) ===
- 1999 Malaysia Ladies Open

=== Other wins (2) ===
- 2003 Lalla Meryem Cup
- 2002 Lalla Meryem Cup
