= Sarah Lee (golfer) =

South Korean professional golfer (born 1979)

Sarah Lee 이정연
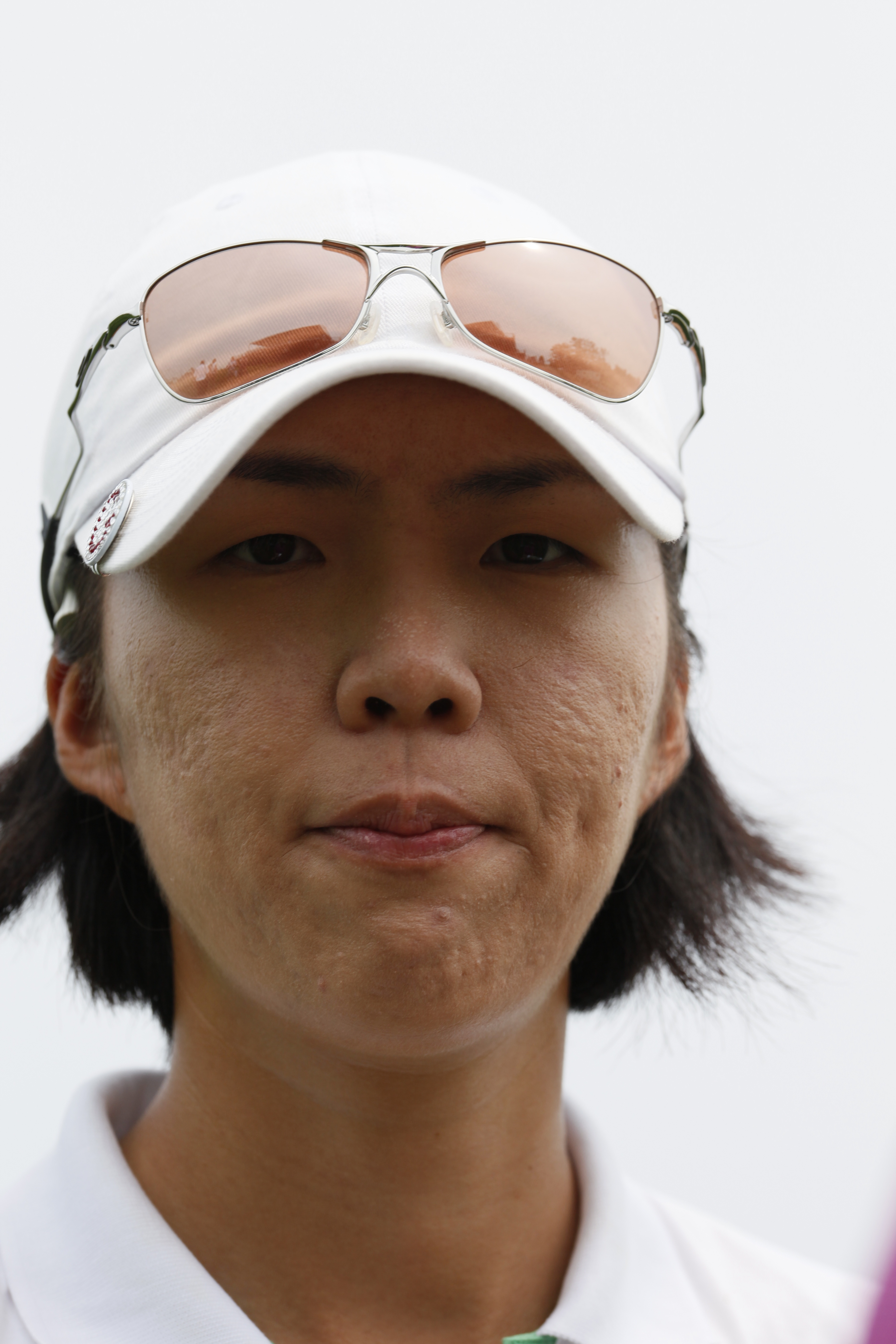
- Lee at the 2009 LPGA Championship

Personal information
- Full name: Jung Yeon Lee
- Nationality: South Korea
- Born: 16 February 1979 (age 47) London, England
- Height: 5 ft 9 in (1.75 m)

Career
- Sport: Golf
- College: Kyung Hee University
- Turned professional: 1998
- Former tours: LPGA of Korea Tour (1998-−001); LPGA Tour (joined 2002); Futures Tour (2001)
- Professional wins: 3

Number of wins by tour
- LPGA of Korea Tour: 1
- Epson Tour: 2

Best results in LPGA major championships
- Chevron Championship: T8: 2004
- Women's PGA C'ship: T10: 2007
- U.S. Women's Open: T38: 2005
- Women's British Open: T8: 2004

Sarah Jung Yeon Lee (Korean: 이정연; born 16 February 1979) is a South Korean professional golfer.

== Career ==
In 1979, Lee was born in London, England. However, she grew up in South Korea. She majored in Physical Education at Kyung Hee University.

In 1998, Lee turned professional. She has three professional wins.

== Personal life ==
She currently resides in Windermere, Florida.

== Professional wins (3) ==
=== LPGA of Korea Tour wins (1) ===
- 1999 SBS Championship

=== Futures Tour wins (2) ===
- 2001 Innerform Golf Challenge, FUTURES Golf Classic at Green Mountain National

== Team appearances ==
Professional

- Lexus Cup (representing Asia team): 2007 (winners), 2008
