= 2001 Women's British Open =

Coordinates: 51.388°N 0.631°W

Tournament information
- Dates: 2–5 August 2001
- Location: Sunningdale, Berkshire, England
- Courses: Sunningdale Golf Club; Old Course
- Organized by: Ladies' Golf Union
- Tours: LPGA Tour; Ladies European Tour

Statistics
- Par: 72
- Length: 6,255 yards (5,720 m)
- Field: 144 players, 70 after cut
- Cut: 146 (+2)
- Prize fund: $1,500,000 €1,712,307 £1,048,951
- Winner's share: $221,650 €253,022 £155,000

Champion
- (South Korea) Se-ri Pak
- 277 (−11)

Location in England

The 2001 Women's British Open was held 2–5 August in England at Sunningdale Golf Club, southwest of London in Sunningdale, Berkshire. It was the 25th edition of the Women's British Open, and the first as a major championship on the LPGA Tour. It replaced the du Maurier Classic in Canada as the fourth and final major of the season.

On Sunningdale's Old Course, Se-ri Pak won the third of her five major titles, two strokes ahead of runner-up Mi -Hyun Kim. Four strokes behind leader Catriona Matthew after 54 holes and tied for ninth, Pak eagled the first hole on Sunday and shot a final round 66 (−6) for 277 (−11).

The event was televised by ESPN and ABC Sports in the United States and BBC Sport in the United Kingdom.

== Round summaries ==
=== First round ===
Thursday, 2 August 2001

Place	Player	Score	To par
1	(Scotland) Janice Moodie	67	−5
T2	(England) Laura Davies	68	−4
T2	(England) Johanna Head	68	−4
T4	(Germany) Elisabeth Esterl	69	−3
T4	(United States) Kelly Robbins	69	−3
T6	(Sweden) Marlene Hedblom	70	−2
T6	(England) Trish Johnson	70	−2
T6	(United States) Rosie Jones	70	−2
T6	(Canada) Lorie Kane	70	−2
T6	(Scotland) Catriona Matthew	70	−2
T6	(United States) Jill McGill	70	−2
T6	(Scotland) Mhairi McKay	70	−2
T6	(France) Marine Monnet	70	−2
T6	(South Korea) Grace Park	70	−2
T6	(Sweden) Annika Sörenstam	70	−2

=== Second round ===
Friday, 3 August 2001

Place	Player	Score	To par
1	(Scotland) Catriona Matthew	70-65=135	−9
T2	(England) Trish Johnson	70-67=137	−7
T2	(South Korea) Mi-Hyun Kim	72-65=137	−7
T2	(Scotland) Janice Moodie	67-70=137	−7
5	(England) Johanna Head	68-70=138	−6
6	(United States) Rosie Jones	70-69=139	−5
T7	(Sweden) Helen Alfredsson	71-69=140	−4
T7	(United States) Dorothy Delasin	71-69=140	−4
T7	(Australia) Wendy Doolan	72-68=140	−4
T7	(Germany) Elisabeth Esterl	69-71=140	−4
T7	(United States) Jill McGill	70-70=140	−4
T7	(Denmark) Iben Tinning	71-69=140	−4

Amateurs: Hudson (−3), Prieto (+6)

=== Third round ===
Saturday, 4 August 2001

Place	Player	Score	To par
1	(Scotland) Catriona Matthew	70-65-72=207	−9
T2	(England) Lora Fairclough	71-70-67=208	−8
T2	(South Korea) Mi-Hyun Kim	72-65-71=208	−8
T2	(Scotland) Janice Moodie	67-70-71=208	−8
T5	(England) Trish Johnson	70-67-72=209	−7
T5	(Australia) Karrie Webb	74-67-68=209	−7
T7	(England) Laura Davies	68-73-69=210	−6
T7	(United States) Rosie Jones	70-69-71=210	−6
T9	(Japan) Kasumi Fujii	71-71-69=211	−5
T9	(United States) Tracy Hanson	72-69-70=211	−5
T9	(England) Rebecca Hudson (a)	71-70-70=211	−5
T9	(South Korea) Se-ri Pak	71-70-70=211	−5

=== Final round ===
Sunday, 5 August 2001

Place	Player	Score	To par	Money ($)
1	(South Korea) Se-ri Pak	71-70-70-66=277	−11	221,650
2	(South Korea) Mi-Hyun Kim	72-65-71-71=279	−9	143,000
T3	(United States) Laura Diaz	74-70-69-67=280	−8	74,092
T3	(Scotland) Catriona Matthew	70-65-72-73=280	−8	74,092
T3	(Scotland) Janice Moodie	67-70-71-72=280	−8	74,092
T3	(Denmark) Iben Tinning	71-69-72-68=280	−8	74,092
T7	(Spain) Marina Arruti	71-73-70-67=281	−7	36,608
T7	(Japan) Kasumi Fujii	71-71-69-70=281	−7	36,608
T7	(Scotland) Kathryn Imrie	75-71-68-67=281	−7	36,608
T7	(United States) Kelli Kuehne	71-70-71-69=281	−7	36,608
T7	(United States) Kristal Parker-Manzo	72-71-71-67=281	−7	36,608

Amateur: Hudson (−3)
