= Women's British Open =

Professional golf competition

The AIG Women's Open
Tournament information
- Location: United Kingdom
- Established: 1976; 50 years ago
- Courses: varies; Royal Lytham & St Annes (2026); Lancashire, England
- Par: 71 (in 2026)
- Length: 6,601 yards (6,036 m) (2026)
- Organised by: The R&A
- Tours: LPGA Tour (1984, 1994–); LET (1979–)
- Format: Stroke play
- Prize fund: $10,000,000 €8,653,384 £7,466,799
- Month played: August
- Website: https://www.aigwomensopen.com/

Tournament record score
- Aggregate: 269 Karrie Webb (1997); 269 Karen Stupples (2004)
- To par: −19 Karrie Webb (1997) −19 Karen Stupples (2004)

Current champion
- (Japan) Shiho Kuwaki

Final champion
- 2026 Women's British Open

The Women's Open (originally known as the Women's British Open, and still widely referred to by that name outside the UK) is a major championship in women's professional golf. It is recognised by both the LPGA Tour and the Ladies European Tour as a major. The reigning champion is Shiho Kuwaki, who won at the 2026 tournament.

Since becoming an LPGA major in 2001 it has generally been played in late July or early August. The 2012 edition was scheduled for mid-September, due to the 2012 Summer Olympics in London, while the 2014 event was played in mid-July, the week prior to the Open Championship.

In 2019 it was known as the AIG Women's British Open. From 2007 to 2018, it was called the Ricoh Women's British Open while the previous twenty editions (1987–2006) were sponsored by Weetabix, a breakfast cereal. In July 2020, the sponsorship agreement with AIG was extended through to 2025; as part of the deal the championship was rebranded by The R&A (which has organised the event since 2017) by removing the "British" qualifier, in line with The R&A's men's and senior men's championships, as the AIG Women's Open. The sponsorship by AIG has since been further extended through 2030.

== History ==
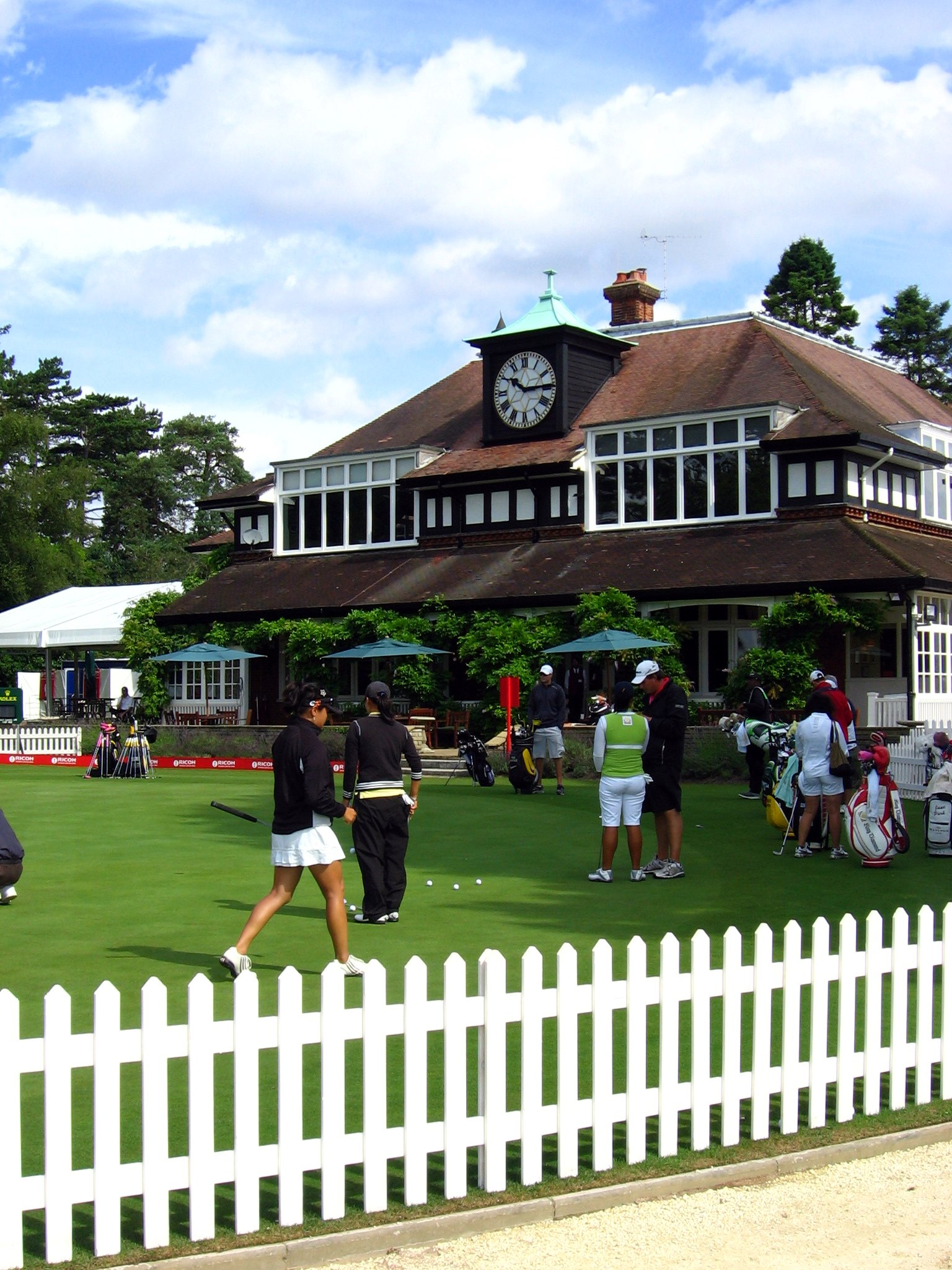
The practice green at Sunningdale Golf Club in 2008.

The first Women's British Open was played in 1976 when the Ladies' British Open Amateur Stroke Play Championship was extended to include professionals. The Amateur Stroke Play Championship had been organised by the Ladies' Golf Union since 1969. In early 1976 two professionals, Vivien Saunders and Gwen Brandom, and the LGU, agreed that the event would be opened up to professionals, with Saunders and Brandom providing £200 in prize money for the professionals. Eventually total prize money was £500, with five professionals competing in the event. An amateur, Jenny Lee Smith, won the event with Saunders the leading professional, tying for fourth place. Saunders won the event in 1977 on "countback", having tied with Mary Everard but having the better final round, 76 to Everard's 79. Janet Melville won in 1978, with Saunders again the leading professional and taking the first prize of £1,000. Just four professionals competed.

From 1979 the event was separated from the Stroke Play Championship, which returned to being an amateur-only event. Prize money of £10,000, and a first prize of £3,000, attracted a larger number of professionals. At first, it was difficult for the organisers to get the most prestigious courses to agree to host the event, with the exception of Royal Birkdale, which hosted it twice during its early days — in 1982 and 1986. After nearly folding in 1983, the tournament was held at the best of the "second-tier" courses, including Woburn Golf and Country Club for seven straight years, 1990 through 1996, as well as in 1984 and 1999.

As its prestige continued to increase, more of the links courses that are in the rotation for The Open Championship, such as Turnberry (2002) and Royal Lytham & St Annes (1998, 2003, 2006) hosted the tournament, in addition to Royal Birkdale (2000, 2005, 2010). In 2007, the tournament took place at the Old Course at St Andrews for the first time.

Since 2010, four additional Open Championship venues became first-time hosts for the women's event: Carnoustie (2011), Royal Liverpool (2012), Royal Troon (2020, year where only women had The Open), and Muirfield (2022). The tournament has yet to be played at two Open Championship courses: Royal St. George's in southeastern England, and Royal Portrush in Northern Ireland. Currently, Turnberry is unable to be on the Open rota because of political ramifications of its owner, the current President of the United States, Donald Trump (who has hosted LIV Golf tournaments on his courses; the owner of that tour, the Saudi Public Investment Fund, organises the Ladies European Tour's Aramco Team Series tournaments).

Unlike its male counterpart, the Women's Open has not adopted a links-only policy. This greatly increases the number of potential venues, especially the number close to the major population centres of England. Following the 2017 merger of the Ladies Golf Union with The R&A, both the men's and women's Opens are operated by The R&A.

Through 1993, the tournament was an official stop only on the Ladies European Tour, with the exception of the 1984 edition, which was co-sanctioned by the LPGA Tour. Starting in 1994, it became a permanent LPGA Tour event, which increased both the quality of the field and the event's prestige. It has been an official LPGA major since 2001, when it replaced the Canadian Women's Open, which lost its title sponsor because of tobacco sponsorship regulations. In 2005, the starting field size was increased to 150, but only the low 65 (plus ties) survive the cut after the second round. In both 2007 and 2008 the prize fund was £1.05 million. Starting in 2009, the prize fund changed from being fixed in pounds to U.S. dollars.

Tied for most victories in the Women's British Open with three each are Karrie Webb of Australia and Sherri Steinhauer of the United States. Both won the tournament twice before it became an LPGA major and once after. Yani Tseng of Taiwan and Jiyai Shin of South Korea are the only multiple winners of the championship as a major. The other multiple winner is Debbie Massey of the U.S., with consecutive wins (1980 and 1981) well before it was an LPGA co-sanctioned event.

== Winners ==
Year	Dates	Champion	Venue	Score	To par	Margin of victory	Runner(s)-up	Purse ($)	Winner's share ($)	Ref
AIG Women's Open
2026	30 Jul – 2 Aug	(Japan) Shiho Kuwaki	Royal Lytham & St Annes	279	–5	Playoff (Note: Kuwaki won with a par at the second extra hole.)	(Germany) Esther Henseleit	10,000,000	1,500,000	
2025	31 Jul – 3 Aug	(Japan) Miyū Yamashita	Royal Porthcawl	277	–11	2 strokes	(England) Charley Hull (Japan) Minami Katsu	9,750,000	1,462,500	
2024	22–25 Aug	(New Zealand) Lydia Ko	St Andrews	281	−7	2 strokes	(United States) Nelly Korda (South Korea) Jiyai Shin (United States) Lilia Vu (China) Ruoning Yin	9,000,000	1,350,000	
2023	10–13 Aug	(United States) Lilia Vu	Walton Heath	274	−14	6 strokes	(England) Charley Hull	9,000,000	1,350,000	
2022	4–7 Aug	(South Africa) Ashleigh Buhai	Muirfield	274	−10	Playoff (Note: Buhai won with a par at the fourth extra hole.)	(South Korea) Chun In-gee	7,300,000	1,095,000	
2021	19–22 Aug	(Sweden) Anna Nordqvist	Carnoustie, Championship	276	−12	1 stroke	(England) Georgia Hall (Sweden) Madelene Sagström (United States) Lizette Salas	5,800,000	870,000	
2020	20–23 Aug	(Germany) Sophia Popov	Royal Troon, Old Course	277	−7	2 strokes	(Thailand) Thidapa Suwannapura	4,500,000	675,000	
AIG Women's British Open
2019	1–4 Aug	(Japan) Hinako Shibuno	Woburn, Marquess Course	270	−18	1 stroke	(United States) Lizette Salas	4,500,000	675,000	
Ricoh Women's British Open
2018	2–5 Aug	(England) Georgia Hall	Royal Lytham & St Annes	271	−17	2 strokes	(Thailand) Pornanong Phatlum	3,250,000	490,000	
2017	3–6 Aug	(South Korea) In-Kyung Kim	Kingsbarns	270	−18	2 strokes	(England) Jodi Ewart Shadoff	3,250,000	504,821	
2016	28–31 Jul	(Thailand) Ariya Jutanugarn	Woburn, Marquess Course	272	−16	3 strokes	(South Korea) Mirim Lee (United States) Mo Martin	3,000,000	412,047	
2015	30 Jul – 2 Aug	(South Korea) Inbee Park	Turnberry	276	−12	3 strokes	(South Korea) Ko Jin-young	3,000,000	464,817	
2014	10–13 Jul	(United States) Mo Martin	Royal Birkdale	287	−1	1 stroke	(China) Shanshan Feng (Norway) Suzann Pettersen	3,000,000	474,575	
2013	1–4 Aug	(United States) Stacy Lewis	St Andrews	280	−8	2 strokes	(South Korea) Na Yeon Choi (South Korea) Hee Young Park	2,750,000	402,583	
2012	13–16 Sep	(South Korea) Jiyai Shin	Royal Liverpool	279	−9	9 strokes	(South Korea) Inbee Park	2,750,000	428,650	
2011	28–31 Jul	(Taiwan) Yani Tseng	Carnoustie	272	−16	4 strokes	(United States) Brittany Lang	2,500,000	392,133	
Women's British Open
2010	29 Jul – 1 Aug	(Taiwan) Yani Tseng	Royal Birkdale	277	−11	1 stroke	(Australia) Katherine Hull	2,500,000	408,714	
2009	30 Jul – 2 Aug	(Scotland) Catriona Matthew	Royal Lytham & St Annes	285	−3	3 strokes	(Australia) Karrie Webb	2,200,000	335,000	
2008	31 Jul – 3 Aug	(South Korea) Jiyai Shin	Sunningdale	270	−18	3 strokes	(Taiwan) Yani Tseng	2,100,000	314,464	
2007	2–5 Aug	(Mexico) Lorena Ochoa	St Andrews	287	−5	4 strokes	(Sweden) Maria Hjorth (South Korea) Jee Young Lee	2,000,000	320,512	
2006	3–6 Aug	(United States) Sherri Steinhauer	Royal Lytham & St Annes	281	−7	3 strokes	(Sweden) Sophie Gustafson (United States) Cristie Kerr	1,800,000	305,440	
2005	28–31 July	(South Korea) Jeong Jang	Royal Birkdale	272	−16	4 strokes	(Sweden) Sophie Gustafson	1,800,000	280,208	
2004	29 July – 1 Aug	(England) Karen Stupples	Sunningdale	269	−19	5 strokes	(Australia) Rachel Hetherington	1,600,000	290,880	
2003	31 July – 3 Aug	(Sweden) Annika Sörenstam	Royal Lytham & St Annes	278	−10	1 stroke	(South Korea) Se Ri Pak	1,600,000	254,880	
2002	8–11 Aug	(Australia) Karrie Webb	Turnberry	273	−15	2 strokes	(Australia) Michelle Ellis (Spain) Paula Martí	1,500,000	236,383	
2001	2–5 Aug	(South Korea) Se Ri Pak	Sunningdale	277	−11	2 strokes	(South Korea) Mi Hyun Kim	1,500,000	221,650	
2000	17–20 Aug	(Sweden) Sophie Gustafson	Royal Birkdale	282	−10	2 strokes	(United States) Becky Iverson (United States) Meg Mallon (Sweden) Liselotte Neumann (England) Kirsty Taylor	1,250,000	178,000	
1999	12–15 Aug	(United States) Sherri Steinhauer	Woburn, Duke's Course	283	−9	1 stroke	(Sweden) Annika Sörenstam	1,000,000	160,000	
1998	13–16 Aug	(United States) Sherri Steinhauer	Royal Lytham & St Annes	292	+4	1 stroke	(United States) Brandie Burton (Sweden) Sophie Gustafson	1,000,000	162,000	
1997	14–17 Aug	(Australia) Karrie Webb	Sunningdale	269	−19	8 strokes	(United States) Rosie Jones	900,000	129,938	
1996	15–18 Aug	(United States) Emilee Klein	Woburn, Duke's Course	277	−11	7 strokes	(United States) Amy Alcott (United States) Penny Hammel	850,000	124,000	
1995	17–20 Aug	(Australia) Karrie Webb	Woburn, Duke's Course	278	−10	6 strokes	(Sweden) Annika Sörenstam (United States) Jill McGill	600,000	92,400	
1994	11–14 Aug	(Sweden) Liselotte Neumann	Woburn, Duke's Course	280	−8	3 strokes	(Sweden) Annika Sörenstam	500,000	80,325	
Weetabix Women's British Open
1993		(Australia) Karen Lunn	Woburn, Duke's Course	275		8 strokes	(United States) Brandie Burton	£300,000	£50,000	
1992		(United States) Patty Sheehan	Woburn, Duke's Course	207 (Note: In 1992 the second day was washed-out and the event reduced to 54 holes.)		3 strokes	(Australia) Corinne Dibnah	£300,000	£50,000	
1991		(England) Penny Grice-Whittaker	Woburn, Duke's Course	284		3 strokes	(Sweden) Helen Alfredsson (England) Diane Barnard	£150,000	£25,000	
1990		(Sweden) Helen Alfredsson	Woburn, Duke's Course	288		Playoff (Note: Alfredsson won with a par at the fourth extra hole.)	(Zimbabwe) Jane Hill	£130,000	£20,000	
1989		(United States) Jane Geddes	Ferndown	274		2 strokes	(Belgium) Florence Descampe	£120,000	£18,000	
1988		(Australia) Corinne Dibnah	Lindrick	295		Playoff (Note: Dibnah won with a birdie at the second extra hole.)	(United States) Sally Little	£100,000	£15,000	
1987		(England) Alison Nicholas	St Mellion	296		1 stroke	(England) Laura Davies (United States) Muffin Spencer-Devlin	£100,000	£15,000	
Women's British Open
1986		(England) Laura Davies	Royal Birkdale	283		4 strokes	(United States) Peggy Conley (Spain) Marta Figueras-Dotti	£60,000	£9,000	
Burberry Women's British Open
1985		(United States) Betsy King	Moor Park	300		2 strokes	(Spain) Marta Figueras-Dotti	£60,000	£9,000	
Hitachi Ladies British Open
1984		(Japan) Ayako Okamoto	Woburn, Duke's Course	289	ｰ3	11 strokes	(United States) Betsy King (Scotland) Dale Reid	£160,000 (Note: Tournament was co-sanctioned by the LET and LPGA Tour. Prize money for this event was in US dollars; £ values here are based on an exchange rate of $1.25–£1.)	£24,000	
1983	Cancelled									
Pretty Polly Women's British Open
1982		(Spain) Marta Figueras-Dotti (a)	Royal Birkdale	296		1 stroke	(United States) Rosie Jones (England) Jenny Lee Smith	£23,000	(£6,000)	
1981		(United States) Debbie Massey	Northumberland	295		4 strokes	(Scotland) Belle Robertson (a)	£19,000	£5,600	
1980		(United States) Debbie Massey	Wentworth	294		1 stroke	(Spain) Marta Figueras-Dotti (a) (Scotland) Belle Robertson (a)	£15,000	£4,500	
1979		(South Africa) Alison Sheard	Southport & Ainsdale	301		3 strokes	(England) Mickey Walker	£10,000	£3,000	
Women's British Open
1978		(England) Janet Melville (a)	Foxhills	310		2 strokes	(Scotland) Wilma Aitken (a)		(£1,000)	
1977		(England) Vivien Saunders	Lindrick Golf Club	306		Countback (Note: Saunders won the title because she had a better last round; 76 to Everard's 79.)	(England) Mary Everard (a)	£500	£210	
1976		(England) Jenny Lee Smith (a)	Fulford	299		2 strokes	(Republic of Ireland) Mary McKenna (a)	£500	(£210)	

(a) denotes amateur

Source for later tournaments:

== Host courses ==
The Women's Open has been played at the following courses, listed in order of number of times hosted (as of 2026):

- 9 Woburn Golf Club (Duke's Course)
- 6 Royal Birkdale Golf Club, Royal Lytham & St Annes Golf Club
- 4 Sunningdale Golf Club (Old Course)
- 3 St Andrews Links (Old Course)
- 2 Woburn Golf Club (Marquess Course), Turnberry Golf Club (Ailsa Course), Lindrick Golf Club, Carnoustie Golf Links
- 1 Royal Liverpool Golf Club, Royal Troon Golf Club (Old Course), Kingsbarns Golf Links, Fulford Golf Club, Wentworth Golf Club, Southport & Ainsdale Golf Club, Ferndown Golf Club, St. Mellion, Moor Park Golf Club, Northumberland Golf Club, Foxhills Golf Club, Muirfield, Walton Heath Golf Club, Royal Porthcawl Golf Club

=== Future venues ===
Year	Edition	Course	Location	Dates	Previously hosted
2027	51st	Royal St George's Golf Club	Sandwich, Kent, England	28 July – 1 August	
2028	52nd	Sunningdale Golf Club	Sunningdale, Berkshire, England	14 – 20 August	1997, 2001, 2004, 2008

== Smyth Salver ==
The Smyth Salver is awarded to the leading amateur, provided that the player completes all 72 holes, for one year. The winner also receives a silver medal. The salver was donated by Moira Smyth, a past president of the Ladies' Golf Union.

- 1979 – Sue Hedges
- 1980 – Marta Figueras-Dotti & Belle Robertson
- 1981 – Belle Robertson
- 1982 – Marta Figueras-Dotti
- 1983 – No championship
- 1984 – Mary McKenna
- 1985 – Jill Thornhill
- 1986 – Vicki Thomas
- 1987 – Joanne Furby
- 1988 – Kathryn Imrie
- 1989 – Joanne Morley
- 1990 – Sarah Bennett
- 1991 – Akiko Fukushima
- 1992 – None
- 1993 – Patricia Meunier & Joanne Morley
- 1994 – Tina Fischer
- 1995 – Lisa Dermott
- 1996 – Barbara Hackett
- 1997 – Silvia Cavalleri
- 1998 – None
- 1999 – Giulia Sergas
- 2000 – None
- 2001 – Rebecca Hudson
- 2002 – None
- 2003 – Elisa Serramia
- 2004 – Louise Stahle
- 2005 – Michelle Wie
- 2006 – Amy Yang
- 2007 – Melissa Reid
- 2008 – Anna Nordqvist
- 2009 – None
- 2010 – Caroline Hedwall
- 2011 – Danielle Kang
- 2012 – Lydia Ko
- 2013 – Georgia Hall & Lydia Ko
- 2014 – Emma Talley
- 2015 – Luna Sobrón
- 2016 – Leona Maguire
- 2017 – Sophie Lamb
- 2018 – Atthaya Thitikul
- 2019 – Atthaya Thitikul
- 2020 – None
- 2021 – Louise Duncan
- 2022 – Rose Zhang
- 2023 – Charlotte Heath
- 2024 – Lottie Woad
- 2025 – Paula Martín Sampedro
- 2026 – Paula Martín Sampedro
