= Karen Stupples =

English professional golfer (born 1973)

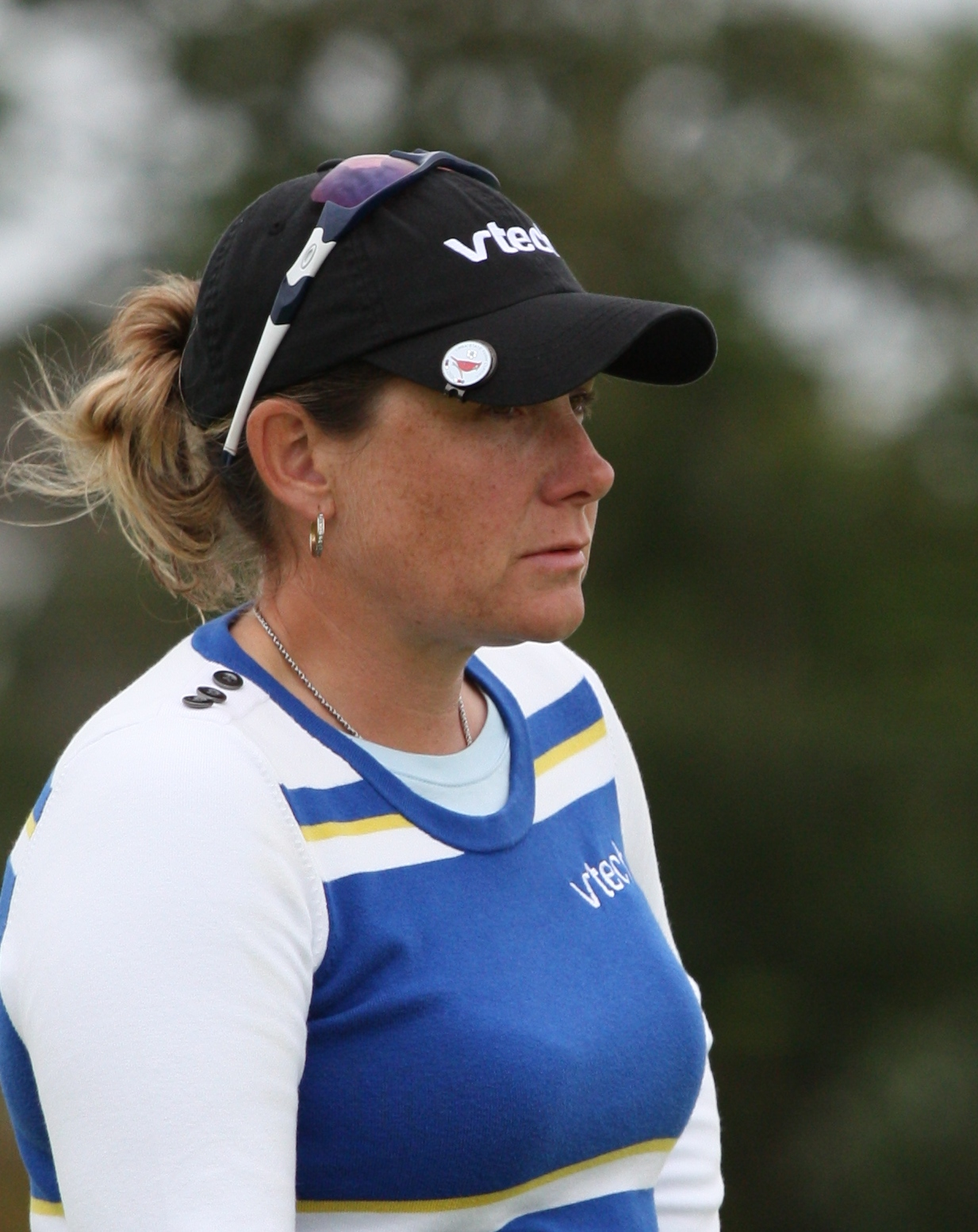
- Stupples at the 2009 Women's British Open

Personal information
- Full name: Karen Louise Stupples
- Nationality: England
- Born: 24 June 1973 (age 53) Dover, Kent, England
- Height: 5 ft 5 in (1.65 m)

Career
- Sport: Golf
- College: Arkansas State University; Florida State University
- Turned professional: 1998
- Former tours: LPGA Tour (joined 1999); Ladies European Tour (joined 2004)
- Professional wins: 3

Number of wins by tour
- LPGA Tour: 2
- Ladies European Tour: 2

Best results in LPGA major championships (wins: 1)
- Chevron Championship: T5: 2010
- Women's PGA C'ship: T9: 2002
- U.S. Women's Open: T10: 2005
- du Maurier Classic: DNP
- Women's British Open: Won: 2004
- Evian Championship: DNP

Karen Louise Stupples (born 24 June 1973) is an English former professional golfer who played primarily on the U.S.-based LPGA Tour and was also a member of the Ladies European Tour.

== Early life and amateur career ==
In 1973, Stupples was born in Dover, Kent. She started her golfing career as a caddie for her father at Prince's Golf Club, Sandwich to earn pocket money. She played for England Juniors from 1989 to 1991 and England Seniors from 1995 to 1998. She also represented Great Britain & Ireland on the Curtis Cup winning team in 1996 at home in Killarney, Ireland and losing 1998 team away in Minneapolis, Minnesota.

Stupples was going to study polymer science in the UK before deciding to go to university in the United States. With the assistance of College Prospects of America, she took a golf scholarship at Arkansas State University before transferring to Florida State University in 1993. As a Seminole, she won two events (Spring 1994 Spalding/Peggy Kirk Bell and Spring 1995 Lady Gator), was selected as All-Atlantic Coast Conference in 1994 and 1995, and was also named a 1995 Second-Team All-American.

== Professional career ==
Stupples turned professional following the 1998 U.S. Women's Amateur.

Despite being a professional, Stupples returned home to England becoming a cloakroom attendant for the Port of Dover and waitressing at a public golf course in Kent as she did not have the money to take a run at LPGA Qualifying School. When a regular restaurant customer offered to sponsor her for three years, she and her husband sold their house, furniture and car and moved to the United States where she earned non-exempt status on the LPGA Tour by tying for 52nd at the 1998 Final Qualifying Tournament.

Stupples made her professional debut in Hawaii and, after a season in which her best finish was a tie for 8th, she returned to the LPGA Final Qualifying Tournament, where she tied for 17th to earn exempt status for the 2000 season. Over the 2000 - 2003 period, she achieved 7 top ten finishes, but her form transformed in 2004.

After finishing second behind Annika Sörenstam at the ANZ Ladies Masters in Australia, Stupples carded the best 72-hole raw score in LPGA Tour history (258) to win her maiden title, the Welch's/Fry's Championship, by five strokes. This win made her eligible to join the Ladies European Tour and begin earning points for the 2005 Solheim Cup. She had not joined the LET when joining the LPGA as she could not at the time afford the joining fee of £600. She followed this up by winning the Women's British Open at Sunningdale where she became only the second player in history to record a double eagle or albatross at an LPGA major championship (began the final round with an eagle, albatross on the first two holes). She became only the third English player to win a major after Laura Davies and Alison Nicholas. and was the first home winner since Penny Grice-Whittaker in 1991. She crossed the $1 million mark in LPGA career earnings at the U.S. Women's Open and finished in sixth place on the money list.

At the end of 2004, Stupples was made an honorary member of Royal Cinque Ports Golf Club in Deal, the Kent golf club which she first joined as a 15-year-old and she attended a reception at Buckingham Palace where she met The Duke of York.

In 2005, Stupples represented England at the 2005 Women's World Cup of Golf in South Africa alongside Laura Davies, was one of Catrin Nilsmark's five wild card picks making her Solheim Cup debut at Crooked Stick GC, in Carmel, Indiana and was part of the International Team at the Lexus Cup.

At the 2014 Women's British Open, Stupples announced her retirement from professional golf.

=== Broadcasting career ===
Stupples has been working with the Golf Channel since 2013 and she currently provides regular commentary during LPGA women's golf broadcasts.

== Personal life ==
Stupples is married to Bobby Inman, who served as her caddie, and she gave birth to a son on 21 April 2007.

== Professional wins (3) ==
=== LPGA Tour wins (2) ===
Legend
LPGA Tour major championships (1)
Other LPGA Tour (1)

No.	Date	Tournament	Winning score	Margin of victory	Runner(s)-up
1	14 May 2004	Welch's/Fry's Championship	−22 (63-66-66-63=258)	5 strokes	(South Korea) Jung Yeon Lee (South Korea) Grace Park
2	1 Aug 2004	Women's British Open^{[1]}	−19 (65-70-70-64=269)	5 strokes	(Australia) Rachel Teske

^{1} Co-sanctioned by the Ladies European Tour.

=== Ladies European Tour wins (2) ===
- 2004 Women's British Open^{2}
- 2009 S4/C Wales Ladies Championship of Europe

^{2} Co-sanctioned by the LPGA Tour

== Major championships ==
=== Wins (1) ===
Year	Championship	Winning score	Margin	Runner-up
2004	Women's British Open	−19 (65-70-70-64=269)	5 strokes	(Australia) Rachel Teske

=== Results timeline ===
Results not in chronological order.

! Tournament	2000
Kraft Nabisco Championship	
LPGA Championship	CUT
U.S. Women's Open	
du Maurier Classic	

! Tournament	2001	2002	2003	2004	2005	2006	2007	2008	2009	2010	2011	2012
Kraft Nabisco Championship			T15	T16	T23	T17		12		T5	T29	T75
LPGA Championship		T9	T20	T30	T25	T69		T69	CUT	CUT	T34	54
U.S. Women's Open		T37	T41	T32	T10	T20		T31	T52	T39	T15	CUT
Women's British Open ^	CUT	T56	T12	1	T11	T10	T42	T24	CUT	CUT	T22	CUT

! Tournament	2013	2014
Kraft Nabisco Championship	T55	
U.S. Women's Open	CUT	
Women's British Open ^	CUT	CUT
LPGA Championship	DQ	
The Evian Championship ^^		

^ The Women's British Open replaced the du Maurier Classic as an LPGA major in 2001.
^^ The Evian Championship became an LPGA major in 2013.

Win
Top 10
Did not play

CUT = missed the half-way cut.
DQ = disqualified
"T" = tied

=== Summary ===
Tournament	Wins	2nd	3rd	Top-5	Top-10	Top-25	Events	Cuts made
Kraft Nabisco Championship	0	0	0	1	1	6	9	9
LPGA Championship	0	0	0	0	1	3	12	8
U.S. Women's Open	0	0	0	0	1	3	11	9
Women's British Open	1	0	0	1	2	6	14	8
Totals	1	0	0	2	5	18	46	34

- Most consecutive cuts made – 24 (2002 LPGA – 2008 British)
- Longest streak of top-10s – 1 (five times)

== LPGA Tour career summary ==
Year	Wins	Earnings ($)	Money list rank	Average
1999	0	34,826	130	73.16
2000	0	59,113	119	73.53
2001	0	91,027	89	72.66
2002	0	214,760	46	72.41
2003	0	325,774	35	71.68
2004	2	968,852	6	70.65
2005	0	304,385	41	72.44
2006	0	276,188	49	72.16
2007	0	61,613	n/a	72.71
2008	0	726,436	23	71.28
2009	0	144,425	68	72.75
2010	0	221,815	46	72.31
2011	0	397,081	29	71.87
2012	0	116,909	73	73.02
2013	0	32,357	110	73.51
2014	0	2,492	167	75.89
2015	Did not play			
2016	0	0	n/a	76.50

== Team appearances ==
Amateur

- European Ladies' Team Championship (representing England): 1995, 1997
- Curtis Cup (representing Great Britain & Ireland): 1996 (winners), 1998
- Vagliano Trophy (representing Great Britain & Ireland): 1997

Professional

- Lexus Cup (representing International team): 2005 (winners), 2008 (winners)
- Solheim Cup (representing Europe): 2005, 2011 (winners)
- World Cup (representing England): 2005

=== Solheim Cup record ===
Year	Total matches	Total W–L–H	Singles W–L–H	Foursomes W–L–H	Fourballs W–L–H	Points won	Points %
Career	5	1–4–0	1–1–0	0–2–0	0–1–0	1	20%
2005	2	0–2–0	0–1–0 lost to M. Mallon 3&1	–	0–1–0 lost w/S. Gustafson 2&1	0	0%
2011	3	1–2–0	1–0–0 def. C. Kerr 10&8^{1}	0–2–0 lost w/M. Reid 1 dn lost w/C. Boeljon 3&2	–	1	33.3%

^{1} Kerr conceded the match at its start, because of injury. Following Solheim Cup rules, this is recorded as a 10 and 8 win for Stupples.
