= Ladies' Golf Union =

Former governing body for female amateur golf in the UK and Ireland

Ladies Golf Union
- Sport: Golf
- Abbreviation: LGU
- Founded: 1893
- Location: St Andrews, Fife
- Replaced: The R&A
- Closure date: 31 December 2016

Official website
- www.lgu.org
- (United Kingdom)
- (Republic of Ireland)

The Ladies' Golf Union (LGU) was the governing body for women's and girls' amateur golf in Great Britain and Ireland. It was founded in 1893 and was based in St Andrews, Fife, Scotland until merging with The R&A at the start of 2017.

Issette Pearson was a founding member and the first Secretary of the LGU.

The LGU was governed by an elected council with equal representation from England, Ireland, Scotland and Wales.

The LGU administered the Women's British Open, one of the major championships in global women's golf, which is open to professionals and nowadays dominated by them. It also ran several of Britain and Ireland championships: Amateur, Mid Amateur, Girls', Stroke Play, and Seniors.

The LGU ran three sets of international matches between teams from England, Ireland, Scotland and Wales: the Home International Matches (mainstream adult competition); the Girls International Matches; and the Senior International Matches. The LGU was also involved in running several competitions involving teams from beyond its home territory: Curtis Cup; Vagliano Trophy; Espirito Santo Trophy; and Commonwealth competitions.

== See also ==
- English Ladies' Golf Union – there are similar bodies for Scotland, Wales and Ireland
- Ladies European Tour – a professional tour
- The R&A – the governing body of golf in the UK & Ireland (and most of the rest of the world).
- English Golf Union – governing body of men's amateur golf in England.
- Women's World Golf Rankings
- Golf in Ireland
