= 2016 in golf =

This article summarizes the highlights of professional and amateur golf in the year 2016.

== Men's professional golf ==
=== Major championships ===
All four were won by first-time major winners for the first time since 2011.

- 7–10 April: Masters Tournament – Danny Willett won by three strokes over Jordan Spieth and Lee Westwood. It was his first major championship victory. It also marks the first time in 20 years that an Englishman has won the Masters.
- 16–19 June: U.S. Open – Dustin Johnson won by three strokes over Jim Furyk, Shane Lowry, and Scott Piercy. It was his first major championship victory.
- 14–17 July: The Open Championship – Henrik Stenson won by three strokes over Phil Mickelson. It was his first major championship victory. Stenson became the first man from Sweden to win a major championship.
- 28–31 July: PGA Championship – Jimmy Walker won by one stroke over Jason Day. It was his first major championship victory, meaning that all four majors were won by first-time winners in 2016.

=== World Golf Championships ===
- 3–6 March WGC-Cadillac Championship – Adam Scott won by one stroke over Bubba Watson. It was his first WGC Cadillac victory, and his second WGC victory overall.
- 23–27 March: WGC-Dell Match Play – Jason Day defeated Louis Oosthuizen 5 & 4 in the final. It was his second WGC-Match Play victory.
- 30 June – 3 July: WGC-Bridgestone Invitational – Dustin Johnson won by 1 stroke over Scott Piercy. It was his first WGC-Bridgestone Invitational victory, and his third WGC victory overall. It was also the third different kind of WGC tournament in which he was victorious.
- 27–30 October: WGC-HSBC Champions – Hideki Matsuyama won by seven strokes over Daniel Berger and Henrik Stenson. It was his first WGC victory.

=== FedEx Cup Playoffs ===
- 25–28 August: The Barclays – Patrick Reed won by one stroke over Emiliano Grillo and Sean O'Hair for his first FedEx Cup playoff victory.
- 2–5 September: Deutsche Bank Championship – Rory McIlroy won by two strokes over Paul Casey for his second Deutsche Bank win and third FedEx Cup playoff win.
- 8–11 September: BMW Championship – Dustin Johnson won by three strokes over Paul Casey for his second BMW Championship and third FedEx Cup playoff win.
- 22–25 September: Tour Championship – Rory McIlroy won in a playoff over Kevin Chappell and Ryan Moore. It was his fourth FedEx Cup playoff tournament victory, and his first FedEx Cup.

=== Other leading PGA Tour events ===
- 12–15 May: The Players Championship – Jason Day won by four strokes over Kevin Chappell. It was his first Players Championship victory, and his tenth PGA Tour victory.

For a complete list of PGA Tour results see 2016 PGA Tour.

=== Leading European Tour events ===
- 26–29 May: BMW PGA Championship – Chris Wood won by one stroke over Rikard Karlberg.
- 3–6 November: Turkish Airlines Open – Thorbjørn Olesen won by three strokes over David Horsey and Li Haotong.
- 10–13 November: Nedbank Golf Challenge – Alex Norén won by six strokes over Wang Jeung-hun.
- 17–20 November: DP World Tour Championship, Dubai – Matt Fitzpatrick won by one stroke over Tyrrell Hatton, while Henrik Stenson clinched the Race to Dubai title. It was Stenson's second Race to Dubai title.

For a complete list of European Tour results see 2016 European Tour.

=== Team events ===
- 15–17 January: EurAsia Cup – Europe beat Asia by a score of 18½ to 5½.
- 30 September – 2 October: Ryder Cup – Team USA regains the trophy with a 17–11 win over Team Europe.
- 24–27 November: World Cup of Golf – The Danish team of Søren Kjeldsen and Thorbjørn Olesen won, giving Denmark their first win in the World Cup.

=== Tour leaders ===
- PGA Tour – (United States) Dustin Johnson (US$9,365,185)
  - This total does not include FedEx Cup bonus.
- European Tour – (Sweden) Henrik Stenson (5,289,506 points)
- Asian Tour – (Australia) Scott Hend (US$1,004,792)
- PGA Tour of Australasia – (Australia) Matthew Griffin (A$239,445)
- PGA Tour Latinoamérica – (United States) Nate Lashley (US$140,897)
- PGA Tour Canada – (United States) Dan McCarthy (C$157,843)
- Challenge Tour – (England) Jordan Smith (209,985 points)
- Japan Golf Tour – Yuta Ikeda (¥207,901,567)
- OneAsia Tour – (South Korea) Choi Jin-ho (US$116,295)
- Sunshine Tour – (South Africa) Brandon Stone (R 7,384,889)– 2016–17 season
- Web.com Tour – (United States) Wesley Bryan (US$449,392)

=== Awards ===
- PGA Tour
  - FedEx Cup – (Northern Ireland) Rory McIlroy
  - PGA Player of the Year – (United States) Dustin Johnson
  - Player of the Year (Jack Nicklaus Trophy) – (United States) Dustin Johnson
  - Leading money winner (Arnold Palmer Award) – (United States) Dustin Johnson
  - Vardon Trophy – (United States) Dustin Johnson
  - Byron Nelson Award – (United States) Dustin Johnson
  - Rookie of the Year – (Argentina) Emiliano Grillo
  - Payne Stewart Award – (United States) Jim Furyk
- European Tour
  - Golfer of the Year – (Sweden) Henrik Stenson
  - Rookie of the Year – (South Korea) Wang Jeung-hun
- Web.com Tour
  - Player of the Year – (United States) Wesley Bryan

=== Other happenings ===
- 27 March: Jason Day becomes the number one golfer in the world.
- 15 April: The Governing Board of the OWGR approved two changes: The addition of the MENA Golf Tour into the world rankings and an increase in the minimum world ranking points for the Korean Tour from six to nine for first-place finishers.
- 7 August: Jim Furyk shot a 12-under-par 58 in the final round of the Travelers Championship, becoming the first player to shoot 58 in a PGA Tour event. This also made Furyk the first PGA Tour pro to card two rounds under 60.

== Women's professional golf ==
=== LPGA majors ===
- 31 March – 3 April: ANA Inspiration – Lydia Ko won by one stroke over Charley Hull and Chun In-gee. It was her first ANA Inspiration championship, second consecutive major championship, and second consecutive LPGA Tour victory.
- 9–12 June: KPMG Women's PGA Championship – Brooke Henderson defeated Lydia Ko in a playoff. It was her first major championship win.
- 7–10 July: U.S. Women's Open – Brittany Lang defeated Anna Nordqvist in a 3-hole aggregate playoff. It was her first major championship win.
- 28–31 July: Women's British Open – Ariya Jutanugarn won by three shots over Mirim Lee and Mo Martin for her first major title.
- 15–18 September: The Evian Championship – Chun In-gee won her first Evian Championship and second major with a record 21-under-par score.

=== Additional LPGA Tour events ===
- 17–20 November: CME Group Tour Championship – Charley Hull won by two strokes over Ryu So-yeon, while Ariya Jutanugarn won the season-long Race to the CME Globe.

For a complete list of LPGA Tour results, see 2016 LPGA Tour.

=== Ladies European Tour event ===
- 7–10 December: Omega Dubai Ladies Masters – Shanshan Feng won by two strokes over Charley Hull.

For a complete list of Ladies European Tour results see 2016 Ladies European Tour.

=== Team events ===
- 21–24 July: International Crown – The United States won with 13 points, beating South Korea by one point.

=== Money list leaders ===
- LPGA Tour – (Thailand) Ariya Jutanugarn (US$2,550,928)
- LPGA of Japan Tour – (South Korea) Lee Bo-mee (¥175,869,794)
- Ladies European Tour – (United States) Beth Allen (€313,079)
- LPGA of Korea Tour – (South Korea) Park Sung-hyun (₩1,333,090,667)
- Ladies Asian Golf Tour – (Germany) Leticia Ras Anderica (US$7,581)
- ALPG Tour – (Australia) Karrie Webb (A$126,767) (2015/16 season)
- Symetra Tour – (Sweden) Madelene Sagström (US$167,064)

=== Awards ===
- LPGA Tour Player of the Year – (Thailand) Ariya Jutanugarn
- LPGA Tour Rookie of the Year – (South Korea) Chun In-gee
- LPGA Tour Vare Trophy – (South Korea) Chun In-gee
- LET Player of the Year – (United States) Beth Allen
- LET Rookie of the Year – (India) Aditi Ashok
- LPGA of Japan Tour Player of the Year – (South Korea) Lee Bo-mee

== Senior men's professional golf ==
=== Senior majors ===
- 19–22 May: Regions Tradition – Bernhard Langer won by six strokes over Olin Browne. He became only the second golfer, after Jack Nicklaus, to win four different senior major championships, and collected his sixth senior major victory overall. It was also his 100th professional golf victory.
- 26–29 May: Senior PGA Championship – Rocco Mediate won by three strokes over Colin Montgomerie. It was his first senior major victory.
- 9–12 June: Senior Players Championship – Bernhard Langer won by one stroke over Joe Durant and Miguel Ángel Jiménez. It was his third straight Senior Players Championship victory, and his seventh senior major victory overall.
- 21–24 July: The Senior Open Championship – Paul Broadhurst won his first senior major by two strokes over Scott McCarron.
- 11–14 August: U.S. Senior Open – Gene Sauers won his first senior major by one stroke over Miguel Ángel Jiménez and Billy Mayfair.

=== Charles Schwab Cup playoff events ===
- 28–30 October: PowerShares QQQ Championship – Tom Pernice Jr. won by one stroke over Colin Montgomerie.
- 4–6 November: Dominion Charity Classic – Scott McCarron won in a playoff over Tom Byrum.
- 10–13 November: Charles Schwab Cup Championship – Paul Goydos won by two strokes over Bernhard Langer.

=== Full results ===
- 2016 PGA Tour Champions
- 2016 European Senior Tour

=== Money list leaders ===
- PGA Tour Champions – German Bernhard Langer topped the money list for the eighth time (fifth consecutive) with earnings of US$3,016,959.
- European Senior Tour – Paul Broadhurst of England topped the Order of Merit for the first time with earnings of €399,285.

=== Awards ===
- PGA Tour Champions
  - Charles Schwab Cup – (Germany) Bernhard Langer
  - Player of the Year – (Germany) Bernhard Langer
  - Rookie of the Year – (England) Paul Broadhurst
  - Leading money winner (Arnold Palmer Award) – (Germany) Bernhard Langer
  - Lowest stroke average (Byron Nelson Award) – (Germany) Bernhard Langer

== Amateur golf ==
- 14–17 January: Latin America Amateur Championship – Paul Chaplet of Costa Rica won by one stroke over Jorge Garcia of Venezuela.
- 20–25 May: NCAA Division I Women's Golf Championships – Washington won its first team title and Virginia Elena Carta of Duke claimed the individual title.
- 27 May – 1 June: NCAA Division I Men's Golf Championships – Aaron Wise of Oregon claimed the individual title and Oregon won the team title.
- 10–12 June: Curtis Cup – Great Britain and Ireland defeat the United States, 11½–8½.
- 13–18 June: The Amateur Championship – England's Scott Gregory defeated Scotland's Robert MacIntyre, 2 & 1.
- 21–25 June: British Ladies Amateur Golf Championship – Sweden's Julia Engström, age 15, defeated the Netherlands' Dewi Weber, in 19 holes – becoming the youngest British Ladies Amateur winner.
- 1–7 August: U.S. Women's Amateur – Seong Eun-jeong defeated Virginia Elena Carta 1 up in the championship match. Seong had won the U.S. Girls' Junior earlier in the year making her the only golfer to win both events in one year.
- 15–21 August: U.S. Amateur – Curtis Luck of Australia defeated American Brad Dalke, 6 & 5, in the final.
- 14–17 September Espirito Santo Trophy – South Korea won by 21 strokes over Switzerland for their fourth trophy.
- 21–24 September Eisenhower Trophy – Australia won by 19 strokes over England for their fourth trophy.
- 5–9 October: Asia-Pacific Amateur Championship – Curtis Luck of Australia defeated countryman Brett Coletta by one stroke.

Other happenings

- 11 May: Hannah O'Sullivan becomes the women's number one golfer in the World Amateur Golf Ranking, overtaking Leona Maguire.
- 29 June: Maverick McNealy becomes the men's number one golfer in the World Amateur Golf Ranking after Jon Rahm turns professional.
- 3 August: Leona Maguire retakes the world number one ranking.

== Golf in multi-sport events ==
- 11–20 August: Summer Olympics – In the men's tournament: Justin Rose of Great Britain won the gold medal, Henrik Stenson of Sweden won the silver and Matt Kuchar of the United States won the bronze. In the women's tournament: Inbee Park of South Korea won the gold medal, Lydia Ko of New Zealand took the silver medal and Shanshan Feng of China won bronze.

== Deaths ==
- 6 January – Christy O'Connor Jnr (born 1948), Irish golfer who won four times on the European Tour.
- 27 January – Mary Lou Crocker (born 1944), American golfer who won once on the LPGA Tour.
- 14 May – Christy O'Connor Snr (born 1924), Irish golfer and World Golf Hall of Fame member; uncle of Christy Jnr.
- 25 September – Arnold Palmer (born 1929), American golfer and World Golf Hall of Fame member; 62 PGA Tour victories, including 7 major titles; co-creator of the Golf Channel and ambassador to the game of golf; creator of Arnold Palmer Hospital for Children.
- 15 October – Barbara Romack (born 1932), American golfer who played three times on the Curtis Cup and won one LPGA Tour event.
- 12 November – Dawn Coe-Jones (born 1960), Canadian golfer and Canadian Golf Hall of Fame member; three LPGA Tour wins.
- 23 November – Peggy Kirk Bell (born 1921), American golfer on the LPGA Tour, winning one major title; she received the Bob Jones Award in 1990.

== Table of results ==
This table summarizes all the results referred to above in date order.

| Dates | Tournament | Status or tour | Winner |
|---|---|---|---|
| 15–17 Jan | EurAsia Cup | Europe v Asia men's professional team event | Team Europe |
| 14–17 Jan | Latin America Amateur Championship | Amateur men's individual tournament | (Costa Rica) Paul Chaplet |
| 3–6 Mar | WGC-Cadillac Championship | World Golf Championships | (Australia) Adam Scott |
| 23–27 Mar | WGC-Dell Match Play | World Golf Championships | (Australia) Jason Day |
| 31 Mar – 3 Apr | ANA Inspiration | LPGA major | (New Zealand) Lydia Ko |
| 7–10 Apr | Masters Tournament | Men's major | (England) Danny Willett |
| 12–15 May | The Players Championship | PGA Tour | (Australia) Jason Day |
| 19–22 May | Regions Tradition | Senior major | (Germany) Bernhard Langer |
| 20–25 May | NCAA Division I Women's Golf Championships | U.S. college championship | Washington / Virginia Elena Carta |
| 26–29 May | BMW PGA Championship | European Tour | (England) Chris Wood |
| 26–29 May | Senior PGA Championship | Senior major | (United States) Rocco Mediate |
| 27 May – 1 Jun | NCAA Division I Men's Golf Championships | U.S. college championship | Oregon / Aaron Wise |
| 9–12 Jun | KPMG Women's PGA Championship | LPGA major | (Canada) Brooke Henderson |
| 9–12 Jun | Constellation Senior Players Championship | Senior major | (Germany) Bernhard Langer |
| 10–12 Jun | Curtis Cup | Amateur women's team tournament | Great Britain and Ireland |
| 13–18 Jun | The Amateur Championship | Amateur men's individual tournament | (England) Scott Gregory |
| 16–19 Jun | U.S. Open | Men's major | (United States) Dustin Johnson |
| 21–25 Jun | British Ladies Amateur Golf Championship | Amateur women's individual tournament | (Sweden) Julia Engström |
| 30 Jun – 3 Jul | WGC-Bridgestone Invitational | World Golf Championships | (United States) Dustin Johnson |
| 7–10 Jul | U.S. Women's Open | LPGA major | (United States) Brittany Lang |
| 14–17 Jul | The Open Championship | Men's major | (Sweden) Henrik Stenson |
| 21–24 Jul | The Senior Open Championship | Senior major | (England) Paul Broadhurst |
| 21–24 Jul | International Crown | LPGA Tour team event | United States |
| 28–31 Jul | Ricoh Women's British Open | LPGA Tour and Ladies European Tour major | (Thailand) Ariya Jutanugarn |
| 28–31 Jul | PGA Championship | Men's major | (United States) Jimmy Walker |
| 1–7 Aug | U.S. Women's Amateur | Amateur women's individual tournament | (South Korea) Seong Eun-jeong |
| 11–14 Aug | U.S. Senior Open | Senior major | (United States) Gene Sauers |
| 11–14 Aug | Summer Olympics | Men's tournament | (United Kingdom) Justin Rose |
| 17–20 Aug | Summer Olympics | Women's tournament | (South Korea) Inbee Park |
| 15–21 Aug | U.S. Amateur | Amateur men's individual tournament | (Australia) Curtis Luck |
| 25–28 Aug | The Barclays | PGA Tour FedEx Cup playoff | (United States) Patrick Reed |
| 2–5 Sep | Deutsche Bank Championship | PGA Tour FedEx Cup playoff | (Northern Ireland) Rory McIlroy |
| 8–11 Sep | BMW Championship | PGA Tour FedEx Cup playoff | (United States) Dustin Johnson |
| 14–17 Sep | Espirito Santo Trophy | Women's amateur team event | South Korea |
| 15–18 Sep | The Evian Championship | LPGA Tour and Ladies European Tour major | (South Korea) Chun In-gee |
| 21–24 Sep | Eisenhower Trophy | Men's amateur team event | Australia |
| 22–25 Sep | The Tour Championship | PGA Tour FedEx Cup playoff | (Northern Ireland) Rory McIlroy |
| 30 Sep – 2 Oct | Ryder Cup | European team vs. United States team men's professional team event | Team USA |
| 5–9 Oct | Asia-Pacific Amateur Championship | Amateur men's individual tournament | (Australia) Curtis Luck |
| 27–30 Oct | WGC-HSBC Champions | World Golf Championships | (Japan) Hideki Matsuyama |
| 28–30 Oct | PowerShares QQQ Championship | PGA Tour Champions Charles Schwab Cup playoff | (United States) Tom Pernice Jr. |
| 4–6 Nov | Dominion Charity Classic | PGA Tour Champions Charles Schwab Cup playoff | (United States) Scott McCarron |
| 10–13 Nov | Charles Schwab Cup Championship | PGA Tour Champions Charles Schwab Cup playoff | (United States) Paul Goydos |
| 17–20 Nov | DP World Tour Championship, Dubai | European Tour | (England) Matt Fitzpatrick |
| 17–20 Nov | CME Group Tour Championship | LPGA Tour | (England) Charley Hull |
| 24–27 Nov | World Cup of Golf | Men's professional team event | Denmark |
