= 2016 CME Group Tour Championship =

Tournament information
- Dates: November 17–20, 2016
- Location: Naples, Florida; 26.248°N 81.765°W
- Courses: Tiburón Golf Club, Gold Course
- Tour: LPGA Tour

Statistics
- Par: 72
- Length: 6,540 yards (5,980 m)
- Field: 68 players
- Cut: none
- Prize fund: $2.0 million
- Winner's share: $500,000

Champion
- (England) Charley Hull
- 269 (−19)
- Location in the United States Location in Florida

The 2016 CME Group Tour Championship was the sixth CME Group Tour Championship, a women's professional golf tournament and the season-ending event on the U.S.-based LPGA Tour. It was played at the Gold Course of Tiburón Golf Club in Naples, Florida.

The CME Group Tour Championship marked the end of the season-long "Race to the CME Globe" in 2016. Each player's season-long "Race to the CME Globe" points was reset before the tournament based on their position in the points list. "Championship points" were awarded to the top 40 players in the CME Group Tour Championship which were added to their "reset points" to determine the overall winner of the "Race to the CME Globe". The event was televised by Golf Channel Thursday through Saturday on a 2-hour delay, and ABC Sunday live.

== Format ==
=== Qualification ===
Called the "CME Group Titleholders" for its first three editions, qualification for the tournament changed for 2014. Previously, the top three finishers in each tournament, not previously qualified, earned entry to the tournament. For 2014 the field was determined by a season-long points race, the "Race to the CME Globe". All players making the cut in a tournament earned points, with 500 points going to the winner. The five major championships had a higher points distribution, with 625 points to the winner. No-cut tournaments only awarded points to the top 40 finishers (top 20 for the Lorena Ochoa Invitational).

Only LPGA members were eligible to earn points. The top 72 players on the "Race to the CME Globe" points list gained entry into the CME Group Titleholders Championship as well as any tournament winners, whether or not an LPGA member, not in the top 72.

=== Field ===
1. Top 72 LPGA members and those tied for 72nd on the "Race to the CME Globe" points standings
Marina Alex (58), Chella Choi (31), Chun In-gee (8), Carlota Ciganda (11), Jacqui Concolino (68), Paula Creamer (64), Austin Ernst (38), Jodi Ewart Shadoff (26), Shanshan Feng (6), Sandra Gal (59), Brooke Henderson (3), Charley Hull (30), M. J. Hur (21), Karine Icher (20), Jang Ha-na (4), Ji Eun-hee (35), Ariya Jutanugarn (1), Moriya Jutanugarn (42), Danielle Kang (33), Kim Kaufman (44), Cristie Kerr (43), Megan Khang (63), Christina Kim (48), Kim Hyo-joo (19), Kim Sei-young (5), Lydia Ko (2), Jessica Korda (27), Candie Kung (24), Brittany Lang (18), Alison Lee (49), Lee Mi-hyang (37), Minjee Lee (7), Mirim Lee (16), Stacy Lewis (13), Lin Xiyu (56), Brittany Lincicome (50), Pernilla Lindberg (60), Gaby López (53), Mo Martin (28), Caroline Masson (29), Catriona Matthew (45), Ai Miyazato (70), Mika Miyazato (61), Azahara Muñoz (40), Haru Nomura (9), Anna Nordqvist (10), Su-Hyun Oh (51), Ryann O'Toole (52), Park Hee-young (39), Suzann Pettersen (23), Pornanong Phatlum (25), Gerina Piller (17), Morgan Pressel (46), Beatriz Recari (57), Paula Reto (67), Ryu So-yeon (14), Lizette Salas (62), Alena Sharp (47), Jenny Shin (22), Sarah Jane Smith (41), Jennifer Song (66), Angela Stanford (34), Kris Tamulis (71), Lexi Thompson (15), Mariajo Uribe (69), Karrie Webb (55), Amy Yang (12), Sakura Yokomine (65)

Did not play: Choi Na-yeon (54), In-Kyung Kim (32), Lee-Anne Pace (36), Inbee Park (72)

2. LPGA Members, not otherwise qualified, who won at least one official LPGA tournament during the season
None

3. Non-members who won at least one official LPGA tournament during the season
None

== Race to the CME Globe ==
=== Reset points ===
Each player's "Race to the CME Globe" points were "reset" before the tournament based on their position in the "Race to the CME Globe" points list. The leader was given 5,000 points, the player in second place 4,500 down to 10 points for the player in 72nd place.

Points	Player	Race Points	Reset points	Events
1	(Thailand) Ariya Jutanugarn	4,491	5,000	27
2	(New Zealand) Lydia Ko	4,365	4,500	23
3	(Canada) Brooke Henderson	3,237	4,000	30
4	(South Korea) Jang Ha-na	2,879	3,600	20
5	(South Korea) Kim Sei-young	2,753	3,200	24
6	(China) Shanshan Feng	2,551	2,800	20
7	(South Korea) Minjee Lee	2,526	2,400	26
8	(South Korea) Chun In-gee	2,494	2,000	18
9	(Japan) Haru Nomura	2,491	1,600	26
10	(Sweden) Anna Nordqvist	2,440	1,200	24

=== Final points ===
"Championship points" were awarded to the top 40 players in the CME Group Tour Championship which were added to their "reset points" to determine the overall winner. The winner of the CME Group Tour Championship received 3,500 points, the second place player 2,400 down to 210 points for the player finishing in 40th place. The effect of the points system was that the top three players in the reset points list prior to the Championship were guaranteed to win the "Race to the CME Globe" by winning the Championship. The top nine in the reset points list had a chance of winning the Race depending on the performances of other players.

Place	Player	Reset points	Championship points	Final points
1	(Thailand) Ariya Jutanugarn	5,000	1,800	6,800
2	(New Zealand) Lydia Ko	4,500	550	5,050
3	(Canada) Brooke Henderson	4,000	370	4,370
4	(England) Charley Hull	420	3,500	3,920
5	(South Korea) Jang Ha-na	3,600	0	3,600
6	(South Korea) Kim Sei-young	3,200	370	3,570
7	(China) Shanshan Feng	2,800	750	3,550
8	(South Korea) Ryu So-yeon	840	2,400	3,240
9	(South Korea) Chun In-gee	2,000	1,000	3,000
10	(Australia) Minjee Lee	2,400	450	2,850

=== Bonus ===
The winner of the "Race to the CME Globe" in 2016, Ariya Jutanugarn, received a $1 million bonus that did not count toward official money list, while Lydia Ko in second place and Brooke Henderson in third place received $150,000 and $100,000, respectively.

== Final leaderboard ==
Sunday, November 20, 2016

Place	Player	Score	To par	Money ($)
1	(England) Charley Hull	67-70-66-66=269	−19	500,000
2	(South Korea) Ryu So-yeon	67-68-69-67=271	−17	164,299
3	(United States) Jennifer Song	72-67-66-68=273	−15	119,187
T4	(Thailand) Ariya Jutanugarn	72-68-65-69=274	−14	75,710
T4	(United States) Mo Martin	68-70-68-68=274	−14	75,710
T4	(Spain) Beatriz Recari	68-68-70-68=274	−14	75,710
7	(South Korea) Chun In-gee	68-69-68-70=275	−13	50,823
T8	(China) Shanshan Feng	66-73-69-68=276	−12	42,278
T8	(South Korea) Amy Yang	68-72-66-70=276	−12	42,278
T10	(New Zealand) Lydia Ko	70-62-73-72=277	−11	35,081
T10	(United States) Brittany Lincicome	69-69-66-73=277	−11	35,081
