= Charley Hull =

English professional golfer (born 1996)

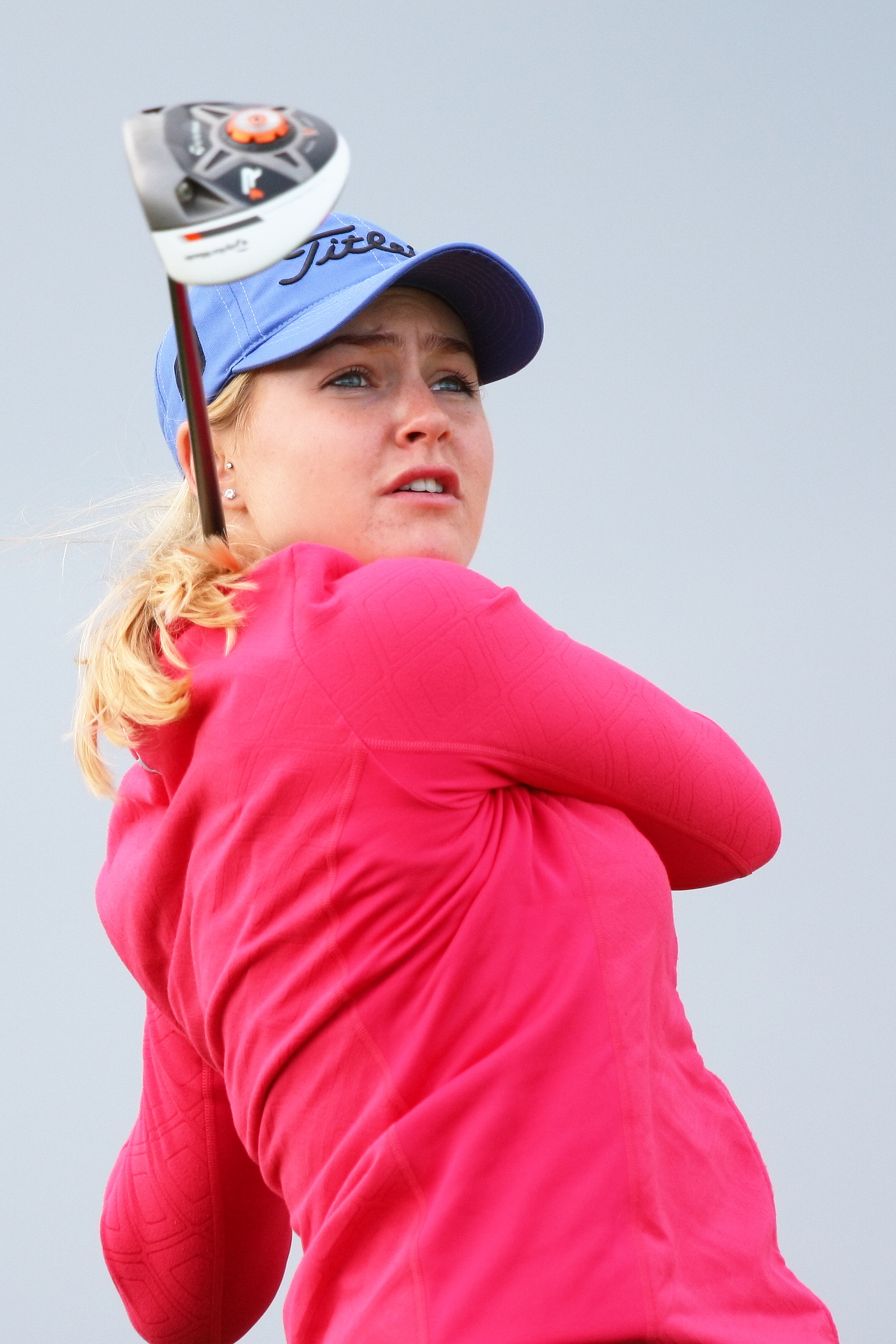
- Hull at the 2013 Women's British Open

Personal information
- Full name: Charley Esmee Hull
- Nationality: England
- Born: 20 March 1996 (age 30) Kettering, Northamptonshire, England
- Height: 5 ft 6 in (168 cm)
- Spouse: Ozzie Smith (m. 2019; div. 2021)

Career
- Sport: Golf
- Turned professional: 2013
- Current tours: Ladies European Tour; LPGA Tour
- Professional wins: 9

Number of wins by tour
- LPGA Tour: 3
- Ladies European Tour: 5
- Other: 1

Best results in LPGA major championships
- Chevron Championship: T2: 2016
- Women's PGA C'ship: T6: 2018
- U.S. Women's Open: T2: 2023, 2026
- Women's British Open: 2nd/T2: 2023, 2025
- Evian Championship: T3: 2022

Achievements and awards
- Ladies European Tour Rookie of the Year: 2013
- Best International Newcomer, SJA British Sports Awards: 2013
- Ladies European Tour Order of Merit: 2014
- Ladies European Tour Player of the Year: 2014

Charley Esmee Hull (born 20 March 1996) is an English professional golfer who has won tournaments on both the Ladies European Tour (LET) and the LPGA Tour.

Aged nine, Hull won the Ladies Golf Union Championship, playing against adults. She went on to have a successful amateur career, winning several national titles, and she was selected by Europe for the Junior Solheim Cup in 2011, and by Great Britain and Ireland for the Curtis Cup in 2012. Hull turned professional in 2013, and after ten top-10 finishes and a debut appearance at the 2013 Solheim Cup (the then youngest ever competitor at the tournament), she was named LET Rookie of the Year. Her first LET title was achieved at the 2014 Lalla Meryem Cup, and she won the LET Order of Merit at the end of the same year. Hull won her first LPGA title in 2016 at the CME Group Tour Championship. She won further LET titles in 2019, 2021 and 2024, and she won her second LPGA title at the Volunteers of America Classic in 2022.

Hull has won nine professional titles during her career, including three on the LPGA Tour, and five on the LET. She has thirteen top-10 finishes in majors, and has finished runner-up on five occasions: at the 2016 ANA Inspiration, the 2023 U.S. Women's Open, the 2023 Women's British Open, the 2025 Women's British Open and the 2026 U.S. Women's Open. Hull has competed in eight Solheim Cups, winning four. In February 2026, she reached a career high world ranking of three.

== Early life and career influences ==
Hull was first introduced to golf when she was two years old, and she began playing with her father at Kettering Golf Club. She joined Woburn Golf Club aged nine or ten and later left school at the age of thirteen to be home-schooled. Hull has stated that once she started home-schooling, she focused on golf ahead of her studies, saying: "I was playing golf from 9 am to 3 pm every day." While discussing her role models, Hull has said that when she was young she looked up to Laura Davies, with Davies herself acknowledging similarities in their style of play. Speaking about Hull, Davies has observed: "She plays golf the way I played golf...She gets her driver out on pretty much every hole, goes for pins and isn't scared of messing things up." Hull has also cited Seve Ballesteros as a role model.

== Amateur career ==
Hull came to public attention aged nine, when she won the Ladies Golf Union Championship at Turnberry, competing against adults. During the event, she scored 28 stableford points from a handicap of 26. Aged ten, she played alongside Morgan Pressel in the British Open Pro-Am. Hull then won several amateur events in Great Britain and the United States and became ranked in the top-10 of the World Amateur Golf Rankings. She won the English Girls under-13 title in July 2008, and in March 2010 she won the Leveret at Formby Ladies. In January 2011, she travelled to Fort Lauderdale, Florida, where she was victorious in the Jones-Doherty match-play Championship, and in May 2011, she won the Welsh Women's Open Stroke Play Championship. She followed this up by triumphing in the English Women's Open Amateur Stroke Play Championship in August, and was then selected to represent Europe in the 2011 Junior Solheim Cup. Hull lost all three of her matches in the tournament, including a 2 and 1 loss to Lindsey Weaver in the singles. The event concluded with the United States retaining the trophy after a 12‍–‍12 tie. At the end of 2011, Hull was crowned the winner of both the English Girls, and Ladies Order of Merit, the first player to win both in the same year.

In January 2012, Hull returned to Florida where she secured victory at the Harder Hall Invitational, winning with a two-stroke margin over Ariya Jutanugarn. Hull was selected by Great Britain and Ireland for the 2012 Curtis Cup at Nairn Golf Club in Scotland. Speaking about her approach to the sport before the competition, Hull said "I don't set myself goals really. I just go out and play. Just have fun, that's what I say." She lost her fourballs and foursomes matches on the first two days but won her singles match 5 and 3 against Lindy Duncan on the final day, with Great Britain and Ireland defeating the United States 10.5–9.5. Hull had initially been removed from the team in a dispute with the Ladies Golf Union (LGU) over a mandatory training session that conflicted with the Kraft Nabisco Championship, a major championship on the LPGA Tour, to which she had been invited. The LGU re-instated Hull to the team and she finished tied-38th at the Kraft Nabisco Championship. She also competed in the 2012 Women's British Open at Hoylake, where she was tied for third after the first round.

== Professional career ==
=== 2013 ===
Hull turned professional on 1 January 2013. She made her professional debut on the Ladies European Tour (LET) in March 2013 at the Lalla Meryem Cup in Agadir, Morocco, where she finished tied-2nd, three strokes behind Ariya Jutanugarn. She then achieved four further consecutive second-place finishes, culminating at the UniCredit Ladies German Open, where she lost in a playoff to Carlota Ciganda. The tournament had been curtailed to two rounds due to heavy rain. In August 2013, Hull was selected by European Solheim Cup captain Liselotte Neumann to compete in the 2013 Solheim Cup against the United States, with Hull becoming the youngest person ever to play in the tournament. Europe then won in the United States for the first time ever, triumphing 18–10. Hull contributed two points, including a 5 and 4 singles win over Paula Creamer, and finished the event with a 2–1–0 record (win–loss–tie). Neumann later praised Hull's performance, calling her "special" and saying "She plays in a fearless way."

With five additional top-ten finishes on the LET, including tied-8th in the season-closing Dubai Ladies Masters, Hull finished sixth on the tour's Order of Merit with earnings of just under €135,995 in fifteen official events. She was awarded the 2013 LET Rookie of the Year award, and was also voted the Best International Newcomer by the Sports Journalists' Association. Hull was also on the shortlist for the BBC Young Sports Personality of the Year, and Tony Jacklin described her as a "precocious talent". At the end of 2013, Hull said that she would divide her 2014 schedule between the LET and the LPGA Tour in the United States.

=== 2014 ===
On 16 March 2014, four days before her 18th birthday, Hull won her first professional title in Morocco at the Lalla Meryem Cup. She trailed Gwladys Nocera by five strokes with one round remaining, but Hull scored a bogey-free round of nine-under-par to finish level with Nocera and force a playoff. Hull then birdied the first sudden-death hole to secure the victory. At the 2014 Kraft Nabisco Championship, Hull finished tied-7th after shooting a four-over-par closing round. She was beaten in a playoff by Kylie Walker at the German Open in July, after both players finished 25-under-par after four rounds. Hull finished second to Xi Yu Lin at the Sanya Ladies Open in November. and then finished tied for fifth in her final Ladies European Tour tournament of the year at the Dubai Ladies Masters, her ninth top-10 finish of the year. She ended the 2014 season by becoming the youngest player to win the LET Order of Merit.

=== 2015 ===
Hull failed to progress through LPGA Qualifying School at the end of 2014, and at the beginning of 2015, she consequently divided her time between playing on the LET and a limited number of events on the LPGA Tour. After her first five tournaments of 2015, Hull reached number 61 on the LPGA money list, and she also entered the top 100 of the LPGA status list which rewarded her with a full exemption to compete whenever she chose to on the LPGA Tour. Hull played in the 2015 Solheim Cup at Golf Club St. Leon-Rot where Europe let slip a 10–6 lead to lose 13.5–14.5. She won all four of her pairs matches during the event, but was caught up in controversy in her day two fourballs match partnering Suzann Pettersen. Their match with Alison Lee and Brittany Lincicome was tied going into the 17th hole. Lee missed a putt to win the hole and Hull walked away. Lee picked up her ball, believing the putt had been conceded, but Pettersen said she had not conceded the putt and the United States forfeited the hole. Europe sealed the match at the 18th hole to win 2 up. Hull was emotional afterwards, but Laura Davies, on Sky, felt that she carried no blame for the incident. Hull lost her singles match to Cristie Kerr 3 and 2 on the final day and finished with a 4–1–0 record. Hull's best finish of the year on the LPGA Tour came at the Taiwan Championship in October, where she finished fourth. In total, Hull made the cut at 13 tournaments out of 14 on the LPGA Tour in 2015. At the end of the year, Hull's world ranking was 41.

=== 2016 ===
At the 2016 ANA Inspiration, Hull finished runner-up, her best ever major result, one stroke behind Lydia Ko. She competed for England at the International Crown in July, where she helped them finish tied-3rd. She then competed for Great Britain at the 2016 Summer Olympics in Rio de Janeiro, where she finished in seventh place, two strokes off the bronze medal position. In 2016, she had five top-ten finishes on the LPGA Tour and won for the first time on the tour at the CME Group Tour Championship in Naples, Florida. Hull finished the event with a tournament record 19-under-par to win by two strokes. She won $500,000 for her win and said it had been a "long time coming" and added: "This is a big win to end the year with, it's nice to have that under my belt." Hull's best LET finish of the year was a second place at the Dubai Ladies Masters in December as Hull finished two strokes behind Shanshan Feng. Hull concluded her year at 16 in the world rankings.

=== 2017 ===
Hull suffered a recurrence of a wrist injury in March and she was unable to record a top-10 finish in a major during 2017. She finished tied-14th at the ANA Inspiration, missed the cut at the Women's PGA Championship, tied-21st at the U.S. Women's Open, tied-16th at the Women's British Open, and finished tied-32nd at the Evian Championship. In the 2017 Solheim Cup, Europe were defeated 11.5–16.5 by the United States at the Des Moines Golf and Country Club, Iowa. Hull finished the event with a 1–1–1 record, with her win coming against Brittany Lang (1 up) in the singles on the final day. Hull achieved her best finish of the year on the LPGA Tour at the KEB Hana Bank Championship in October, when she finished tied-6th. At the Dubai Ladies Classic in December, she recorded her best LET finish of the year with a fifth place, three strokes behind Angel Yin. Hull ended her year at 28 in the world rankings.

=== 2018 ===
At the 2018 ANA Inspiration, Hull finished tied-6th at 13-under-par, two shots behind winner Pernilla Lindberg. She finished tied-10th in the U.S. Women's Open at Shoal Creek, and then secured her third top-10 major finish of 2018 at the Women's PGA Championship, where she finished tied-6th, four strokes behind Park Sung-hyun at Kemper Lakes. At the International Crown, Hull helped England finish in a tie for second behind South Korea. Her best placed finish of 2018 in a LPGA Tour event came at the KEB Hana Bank Championship in October, where she finished runner-up, three strokes behind Chun In-gee. During the year, Hull made the cut at 22 of the 24 LPGA events that she played, and she ended the year at 24 in the world rankings.

=== 2019 ===
On 12 January 2019, Hull won the Fatima Bint Mubarak Ladies Open at the Saadiyat Beach Golf Club in Abu Dhabi. She finished one stroke ahead of second-placed Marianne Skarpnord to win the LET event. In the 2019 Solheim Cup at Gleneagles Hotel, Scotland, Hull finished unbeaten in all four of her matches to help Europe to a 14.5–13.5 win over the United States. Hull won two matches in the foursomes partnering Azahara Muñoz, and tied her singles match on the final day with Megan Khang, to finish with a 2–0–2 record. On the LPGA Tour, Hull finished a season-best second at the CME Group Tour Championship in November, behind winner Sei Young Kim. Hull finished 2019 at 26 in the world rankings.

=== 2020 ===
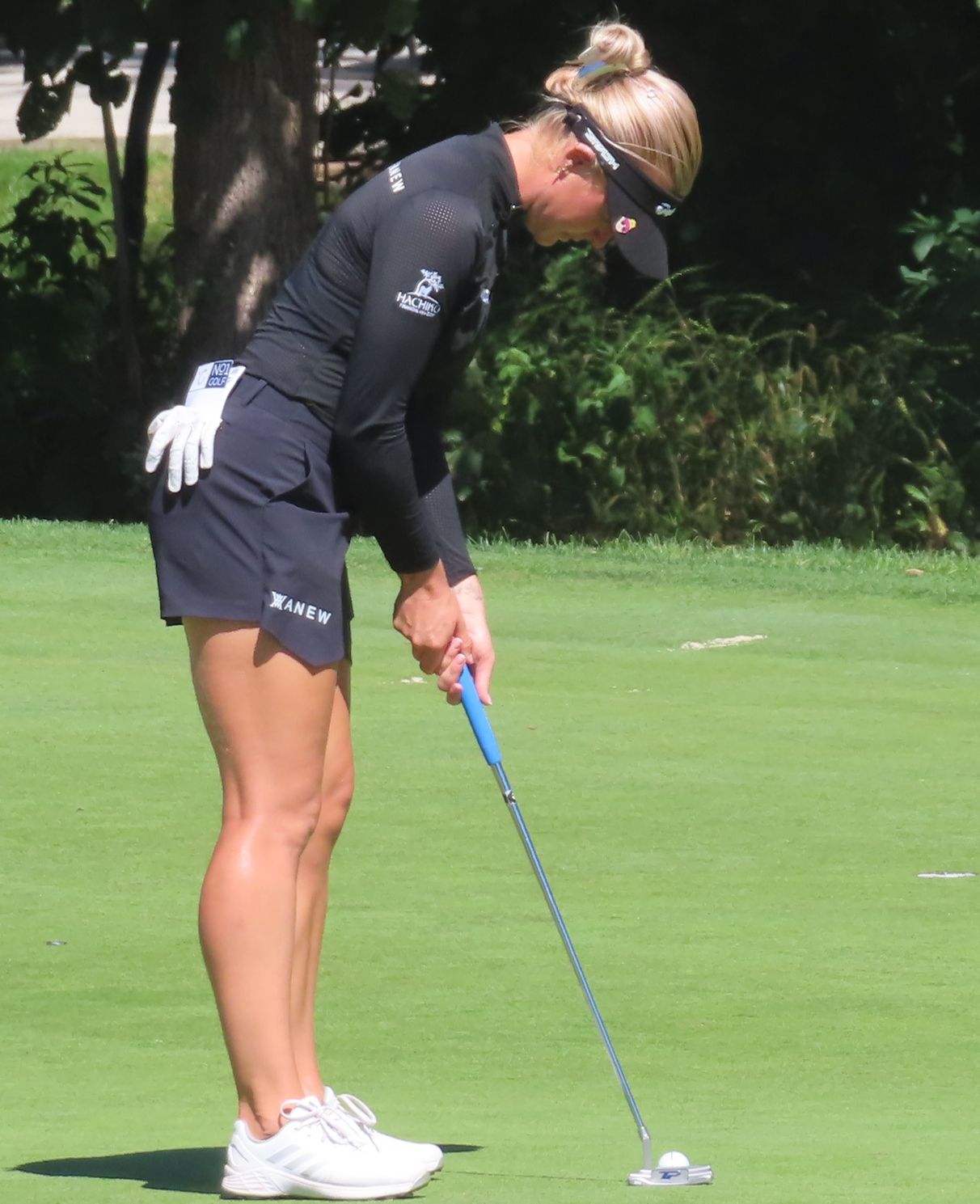
Hull at the 2022 Dana Open

In June 2020, during a suspension of all the major golf tours due to the COVID-19 pandemic, Hull won the opening event of the Rose Ladies Series in the United Kingdom, and in early August, finished second in the final event to top the series standings ahead of Georgia Hall. After the tours had resumed, she missed the halfway cut at the AIG Women's Open, the first major of the year. In September, she tested positive for COVID-19 during pre-tournament testing for the ANA Inspiration and was forced to withdraw from the year's second major. In October, she finished in a tie for seventh place in the Women's PGA Championship. Hull finished in a tie for sixth at the Saudi Ladies International in November. Her best finish on the LPGA Tour in 2020 came at the Volunteers of America Classic in December, where she finished tied-6th, four strokes behind Angela Stanford. She finished the year at 34 in the world rankings.

=== 2021 ===
Hull chose not to take part in the Tokyo Summer Olympics, citing scheduling concerns. She finished in a tie for fifth in the Women's Scottish Open at Dumbarnie Links in August, and was later part of the European team that triumphed 15–13 over the United States in the 2021 Solheim Cup at the Inverness Club, Toledo, Ohio. Hull finished 2–2–0 from her four matches. She won both of her points for Europe alongside Emily Kristine Pedersen. In the day one foursomes, they beat Lexi Thompson and Brittany Altomare (1 up), and in the day two fourballs, they were victorious over Danielle Kang and Austin Ernst (4 and 2). Hull then secured her third title on the LET at the Aramco team Series-New York event in October. She clinched a one-stroke victory, with Nelly Korda her closest challenger. Hull finished the year with a tied-15th finish at the Tour Championship and ended at 33 in the world rankings.

=== 2022 ===
Hull finished in a tie for third at the 2022 Evian Championship, two shots behind champion Brooke Henderson. In October, Hull was victorious at the Volunteers of America Classic, held at the Old American Golf Club in Texas. It was Hull's first victory on the LPGA Tour for six years and she shot a seven-under-par round on the final day to seal the trophy. She finished 18-under-par overall, which was a joint-record for the event. She believed that an improvement in her confidence had led to her victory. In November, Hull was defeated in a playoff by Chiara Noja at the Aramco Team Series-Jeddah, after both players finished the tournament at 13-under-par. Afterwards, it was revealed in the media that Hull had been Noja's idol growing up. During 2022, Hull recorded five top-10 finishes on the LPGA Tour and won over $1m in prize money. At the end of the year, she was at number 17 in the world rankings.

=== 2023 ===
Hull began her year with a tied-2nd finish at the Tournament of Champions in Orlando, Florida. She finished four strokes behind winner Brooke Henderson. She also finished in a tie for second place at the 2023 U.S. Women's Open at Pebble Beach, three shots behind Allisen Corpuz. In the first round of the Aramco Team Series-London in July, she carded a five-under-par 68, firing ten birdies and a quintuple-bogey 10 on the par-5 sixth hole at the Centurion Club. She finished the tournament in second place at seven-under-par, four shots behind Nelly Korda. In the 2023 Women's British Open at Walton Heath, Hull finished in second place, six shots adrift of winner Lilia Vu, Hull said she felt "deflated" not to win. Hull finished second for the fifth time in 2023 at the Kroger Queen City Championship. She lost a playoff to Minjee Lee in Cincinnati, Ohio. At the 2023 Solheim Cup at Finca Cortesin in Casares, Andalusia, Hull finished with a 1–2–0 record as Europe and the United States finished tied 14–14, meaning that Europe retained the trophy. Hull was defeated, 4 and 2, by Danielle Kang in singles. She finished the year at number eight in the world rankings.

=== 2024 ===
Hull finished in a tie for second, three strokes behind Alexandra Försterling at the Aramco Team Series-Tampa in March. After Hull then finished tenth at the Fir Hills Seri Pak Championship, former Solheim Cup player Trish Johnson questioned Hull's aggressive approach to the game and said: "She doesn't win anywhere near enough for her talent [...] The thing with Charley is you're never going to change her [...] She's just going to go for every pin." Hull was later selected by Great Britain for the 2024 Summer Olympics in Paris. She endured a 'difficult' first round where she shot a nine-over-par 81, to fall 16 shots off the gold medal position. Hull fought back and eventually finished tied-27th on one-over-par, eleven strokes behind gold medal winner Lydia Ko. Hull competed for Europe in the 2024 Solheim Cup, which was staged at the Robert Trent Jones Golf Club in Gainesville, Virginia. She won three of her five matches, including a 6 and 4 victory against Nelly Korda in the final day singles, but could not prevent the United States securing the overall victory. Hull finished the event with a 3–2–0 record.

In November, Hull clinched her first victory since 2022 when she triumphed in the Aramco Team Series event in Riyadh. She won the tournament by three strokes and ended a sequence of finishing runner-up six times without victory. She then finished tied-2nd at The Annika, three strokes behind Nelly Korda. Hull had taken a one-stroke lead into the final round but shot a one-over-par 71 to slip back. After the tournament, in which Hull finished her round in increasing darkness, Hull was critical of slow play by several of her fellow professionals, and called for punishments, starting at two-shot penalties, up to the loss of Tour Cards for repeat offenders. She ended the year as the world number ten.

=== 2025 ===
In March, at the Women's World Golf Championship in Singapore, Hull held a one-shot lead at the end of the third round. However, a final-round 74 saw her miss out on the title to Lydia Ko, and Hull finished T4th, six shots behind Ko. She finished fourth at the Women's Irish Open in early July, but the following week she was forced to withdraw from the Evian Championship after collapsing during her opening round. At the Women's British Open, Hull finished in a tied-2nd at Royal Porthcawl, two strokes behind Miyu Yamashita. At the PIF Global Series event in Houston, Hull finished tied for second as she chased her first victory of 2025, which she would get the following week at the Kroger Queen City Championship by one stroke over world No. 1 Jeeno Thitikul who four-putted the par-5 18th hole, allowing Hull a tap-in birdie for the win and her third LPGA title.

In September, Hull reached a career high of number five in the world rankings, becoming the first Englishwoman to reach the top-5 since the rankings were introduced in 2006. The following month, she competed for the World team at the 2025 International Crown, and they finished in third position. In November, Hull finished in a share for fourth place at The Annika.

=== 2026 ===
In February 2026, Hull won the PIF Saudi Ladies International. She recorded a seven-under-par round on the final day to secure a one-stroke victory and claim her fifth career title on the Ladies European Tour. She then subsequently rose to a career-high number three in the world rankings. At the 2026 Chevron Championship, she finished in a tie for tenth, and at the U.S. Women's Open, Hull finished in a tie for second, the fifth time she had come runner-up at a major. She had trailed by seven strokes at the halfway stage, but shot a record-equalling 36-hole low total for the event, which left her one stroke behind Nelly Korda. In August, Hull finished tied-6th at the Women's British Open.

Hull posted an eleven-under-par 62 in her second round of the PIF London Championship in August. Her round was a new course record at the Centurion Club, and her score of 62 equalled the lowest-scoring round in LET history. She held a one-shot advantage over Anna Huang with two holes of the final round remaining, but four putted on the 17th green, and finished runner-up.

Hull competed for Europe in the 2026 Solheim Cup at Bernardus Golf in the Nertherlands. She partnered Lottie Woad in the first four sessions; the pairing were defeated in the foursomes and tied their fourballs match on day one, before losing in both the foursomes and fourballs on day two. On day three, she beat Megan Khang 3 and 2 in the singles to end the competition with a 1–3–1 record. Europe reclaimed the trophy from the United States with an overall 15–13 victory. Later in the year, she joined the indoor TGL League, where she competed for Atlanta Drive Golf Club.

== Personal life ==
Hull was born in Kettering, Northamptonshire, to David, a retired plasterer, and Basienka, a Polish-born former county-level tennis player. She has two half-sisters, one from each parent. Hull married Ozzie Smith, a mixed martial arts fighter, in Burton Latimer on 21 September 2019. The couple later divorced in 2021. Hull is close friends with another professional golfer, Georgia Hall, having first met around the age of 11.

Hull has a keen interest in fashion, which she displays both on and off the golf course, and has held associations with clothing sponsors such as Anew, and Malbon Golf. She is also a keen gym-goer, has called golf-related exercises "boring" and prefers running and weights based exercise.

In July 2023, Hull revealed that she had been diagnosed with attention deficit hyperactivity disorder (ADHD), saying: "I find it hard to concentrate but I've found my triggers now" and explained the importance of keeping her mind busy. Hull said in 2024 that she had been diagnosed with degenerative arthritis in her shoulder. She explained that the condition worsened in cold weather.

In June 2024, a video of Hull smoking at the U.S. Women's Open went viral online. Speaking about her lifestyle in September 2024 Hull stated: "I live my life the way I want to live it, not how anyone else wants me to live it." She has also said: "It’s the only bad thing I do!" and has stated that she rarely drinks alcohol and eats healthily. Hull released a video on Instagram in March 2025 telling fellow golfer Ryan Evans that she would give him $10,000 if she could not quit smoking for two months.

Hull made a cameo in the 2025 film Happy Gilmore 2.

Hull has publicly spoken out against single-sex golf clubs. When asked by the BBC if she had experienced discrimination on the course, she recounted that when she was seven years old she defeated a 17-year-old boy and he swore at her after the match.

In 2026, Hull fooled her caddie Adam Woodward into believing that he had won £100,000 after buying him a fake scratch card. She received a polarizing response to the prank, and Hull stated that her critics should "lighten up".

== Amateur wins ==
- 2008 English Girls under-13 Championship
- 2010 The Leveret, Hampshire Rose
- 2011 Ione D Jones/Doherty Championship, Welsh Women's Open Stroke Play Championship, English Women's Open Amateur Stroke Play Championship
- 2012 Harder Hall Invitational

== Professional wins (9) ==
=== LPGA Tour wins (3) ===
Legend
Major championships (0)
Other LPGA Tour (3)

| No. | Date | Tournament | Winning score | To par | Margin of victory | Runner-up | Winner's share ($) | Ref |
|---|---|---|---|---|---|---|---|---|
| 1 | 20 Nov 2016 | CME Group Tour Championship | 67-70-66-66=269 | −19 | 2 strokes | (South Korea) Ryu So-yeon | 500,000 | |
| 2 | 2 Oct 2022 | Volunteers of America Classic | 67-64-71-64=266 | −18 | 1 stroke | (China) Lin Xiyu | 255,000 | |
| 3 | 14 Sep 2025 | Kroger Queen City Championship | 68-65-67-68=268 | –20 | 1 stroke | (Thailand) Atthaya Thitikul | 300,000 | |

LPGA Tour playoff record (0–1)

| No. | Year | Tournament | Opponent(s) | Result | Ref |
|---|---|---|---|---|---|
| 1 | 2023 | Kroger Queen City Championship | (Australia) Minjee Lee | Lost to birdie on second extra hole | |

=== Ladies European Tour wins (5) ===
| No. | Date | Tournament | Winning score | To par | Margin of victory | Runner-up | Winner's share (€) | Ref |
|---|---|---|---|---|---|---|---|---|
| 1 | 16 Mar 2014 | Lalla Meryem Cup | 68-71-68-62=269 | −15 | Playoff | (France) Gwladys Nocera | 67,500 | |
| 2 | 12 Jan 2019 | Fatima Bint Mubarak Ladies Open | 67-72-69=208 | −8 | 1 stroke | (Norway) Marianne Skarpnord | 38,115 | |
| 3 | 16 Oct 2021 | Aramco Team Series – New York | 69-70-65=204 | −12 | 1 stroke | (United States) Nelly Korda | 25,864 | |
| 4 | 2 Nov 2024 | Aramco Team Series – Riyadh | 65-67-66=198 | −18 | 3 strokes | (Denmark) Nicole Broch Estrup | 69,191 | |
| 5 | 14 Feb 2026 | PIF Saudi Ladies International | 70-67-67-65=269 | −19 | 1 stroke | (South Africa) Casandra Alexander (Japan) Akie Iwai | 549,000 | |

LET playoff record (1–3)

| No. | Year | Tournament | Opponent | Result | Ref |
|---|---|---|---|---|---|
| 1 | 2013 | UniCredit Ladies German Open | (Spain) Carlota Ciganda | Lost to birdie on first extra hole | |
| 2 | 2014 | Lalla Meryem Cup | (France) Gwladys Nocera | Won with birdie on first extra hole | |
| 3 | 2014 | Ladies German Open | (Scotland) Kylie Walker | Lost to par on first extra hole | |
| 4 | 2022 | Aramco Team Series - Jeddah | (Germany) Chiara Noja | Lost to birdie on second extra hole | |

=== Other wins (1) ===
- 2020 Rose Ladies Series – Event 1

== Results in LPGA majors ==
Results not in chronological order.

| Tournament | 2012 | 2013 | 2014 | 2015 | 2016 | 2017 | 2018 | 2019 | 2020 |
|---|---|---|---|---|---|---|---|---|---|
| Chevron Championship | T38 | | T7 | T26 | T2 | T14 | T6 | T12 | (Note: Forced to withdraw prior to the start of the tournament after testing positive for COVID-19.) |
| U.S. Women's Open | | | | T42 | CUT | T21 | T10 | T16 | T30 |
| Women's PGA Championship | | | | T26 | 16 | CUT | T6 | CUT | T7 |
| The Evian Championship (Note: The Evian Championship was added as a major on the LPGA Tour in 2013.) | | CUT | T47 | T38 | T52 | T32 | T22 | T30 | NT |
| Women's British Open | CUT | CUT | T12 | T31 | T17 | T16 | CUT | T24 | CUT |

| Tournament | 2021 | 2022 | 2023 | 2024 | 2025 | 2026 |
|---|---|---|---|---|---|---|
| Chevron Championship | T14 | T25 | CUT | T23 | CUT | T10 |
| U.S. Women's Open | CUT | T20 | T2 | T19 | T12 | T2 |
| Women's PGA Championship | T21 | CUT | CUT | T16 | T12 | CUT |
| The Evian Championship | T25 | T3 | CUT | CUT | WD | T16 |
| Women's British Open | CUT | T22 | 2 | T20 | T2 | T6 |

Top 10
Did not play

CUT = missed the half-way cut
WD = withdrew
T = tied
NT = no tournament

=== Summary ===
| Tournament | Wins | 2nd | 3rd | Top-5 | Top-10 | Top-25 | Events | Cuts made |
|---|---|---|---|---|---|---|---|---|
| Chevron Championship | 0 | 1 | 0 | 1 | 4 | 10 | 13 | 11 |
| U.S. Women's Open | 0 | 2 | 0 | 2 | 3 | 8 | 12 | 10 |
| Women's PGA Championship | 0 | 0 | 0 | 0 | 2 | 6 | 12 | 7 |
| The Evian Championship | 0 | 0 | 1 | 1 | 1 | 4 | 13 | 9 |
| Women's British Open | 0 | 2 | 0 | 2 | 3 | 9 | 15 | 10 |
| Totals | 0 | 5 | 1 | 6 | 13 | 37 | 65 | 47 |

- Most consecutive cuts made – 10 (2014 ANA – 2016 Women's PGA)
- Longest streak of top-10s – 3 (twice)

== LPGA Tour career summary ==
| Year | Tournaments played | Cuts made* | Wins | 2nds | 3rds | Top 10s | Best finish | Earnings ($) | Money list rank | Scoring average | Scoring rank |
|---|---|---|---|---|---|---|---|---|---|---|---|
| 2012 | 2 | 1 | 0 | 0 | 0 | 0 | T38 | n/a | n/a | 73.33 | n/a |
| 2013 | 4 | 2 | 0 | 0 | 0 | 0 | T17 | n/a | n/a | 71.83 | n/a |
| 2014 | 10 | 7 | 0 | 0 | 1 | 2 | T3 | n/a | n/a | 71.68 | n/a |
| 2015 | 14 | 13 | 0 | 0 | 0 | 3 | 4 | 359,929 | 48 | 71.43 | 32 |
| 2016 | 22 | 19 | 1 | 1 | 0 | 5 | 1 | 1,114,360 | 15 | 70.60 | 18 |
| 2017 | 22 | 18 | 0 | 0 | 0 | 3 | T6 | 442,942 | 46 | 71.10 | 43 |
| 2018 | 24 | 22 | 0 | 1 | 1 | 6 | 2 | 869,012 | 19 | 70.28 | 16 |
| 2019 | 22 | 17 | 0 | 1 | 0 | 2 | 2 | 885,961 | 19 | 71.39 | 58 |
| 2020 | 8 | 6 | 0 | 0 | 0 | 2 | T6 | 281,594 | 40 | 71.36 | 31 |
| 2021 | 19 | 17 | 0 | 0 | 0 | 2 | 5 | 392,308 | 55 | 70.73 | 35 |
| 2022 | 18 | 13 | 1 | 0 | 1 | 5 | 1 | 1,084,968 | 21 | 70.15 | 16 |
| 2023 | 18 | 14 | 0 | 4 | 0 | 5 | 2 | 2,395,650 | 6 | 70.30 | 15 |
| 2024 | 17 | 15 | 0 | 1 | 0 | 5 | T2 | 1,104,000 | 28 | 70.53 | 14 |
| 2025 | 15 | 14 | 1 | 1 | 0 | 4 | 1 | 1,971,350 | 9 | 69.93 | 9 |
| Totals^ | 199 (2015) | 168 (2015) | 3 | 9 | 3 | 42 | 1 | 10,902,074 | 28 | | |

^ official as of 2025 season
* Includes matchplay and other tournaments without a cut.

== World ranking ==
Position in Women's World Golf Rankings at the end of each calendar year.

| Year | Ranking | Source |
|---|---|---|
| 2012 | 352 | |
| 2013 | 99 | |
| 2014 | 38 | |
| 2015 | 41 | |
| 2016 | 16 | |
| 2017 | 28 | |
| 2018 | 24 | |
| 2019 | 26 | |
| 2020 | 34 | |
| 2021 | 33 | |
| 2022 | 17 | |
| 2023 | 8 | |
| 2024 | 10 | |
| 2025 | 5 | |

== Team appearances ==
Amateur

- European Ladies' Team Championship (representing England): 2011
- Junior Vagliano Trophy: (representing Great Britain & Ireland): 2011
- Junior Solheim Cup (representing Europe): 2011
- European Girls' Team Championship (representing the England): 2012
- Curtis Cup (representing Great Britain & Ireland): 2012 (winners)
- Espirito Santo Trophy (representing England): 2012

Professional

- Solheim Cup (representing Europe): 2013 (winners), 2015, 2017, 2019 (winners), 2021 (winners), 2023 (tie, trophy retained), 2024, 2026 (winners)
- International Crown (representing England): 2016, 2018, (representing World team): 2025

=== Solheim Cup record ===
| Year | Total matches | Total W–L–H | Singles W–L–H | Foursomes W–L–H | Fourballs W–L–H | Points won | Points % |
|---|---|---|---|---|---|---|---|
| Career | 32 | 16–12–4 | 4–3–1 | 6–5–1 | 6–4–2 | 18 | 56.3 |
| 2013 | 3 | 2–1–0 | 1–0–0 def. P. Creamer 5&4 | 0–0–0 | 1–1–0 lost w/ C. Matthew 2&1 won w/ J. Ewart Shadoff 2 up | 2 | 66.7 |
| 2015 | 5 | 4–1–0 | 0–1–0 lost to C. Kerr 3&2 | 2–0–0 won w/ M. Reid 2&1 won w/ S. Pettersen 1 up | 2–0–0 won w/ G. Nocera 3&2 won w/ S. Pettersen 2 up | 4 | 80.0 |
| 2017 | 3 | 1–1–1 | 1–0–0 def. B.Lang 1 up | 0–0–1 halved w/ M. Reid | 0–1–0 lost w/ G.Hall 2&1 | 1.5 | 50.0 |
| 2019 | 4 | 2–0–2 | 0–0–1 halved w/ M. Khang | 2–0–0 won w/ A. Muñoz 2&1 won w/ A. Muñoz 4&3 | 0–0–1 halved w/ A. Muñoz | 3 | 75.0 |
| 2021 | 4 | 2–2–0 | 0–1–0 lost to J. Korda 3&1 | 1–1–0 won w/ E. Pedersen 1 up lost w/ E. Pedersen 2&1 | 1–0–0 won w/ E. Pedersen 3&2 | 2 | 50.0 |
| 2023 | 3 | 1–2–0 | 0–1–0 lost to D. Kang 4&2 | 0–1–0 lost w/ E. Pedersen 5&4 | 1–0–0 won w/ L. Maguire 4&3 | 1 | 33.3 |
| 2024 | 5 | 3–2–0 | 1–0-0 def. N. Korda 6&4 | 1–1–0 lost w/ E. Henseleit 3&2 won w/ E. Henseleit 1 up | 1–1–0 lost w/ L. Grant 5&4 won w/ G. Hall 2 up | 3 | 60.0 |
| 2026 | 5 | 1–3–1 | 1–0-0 def. M. Khang 3&2 | 0–2–0 lost w/ L. Woad 4&3 lost w/ L. Woad 6&5 | 0–1–1 halved w/ L. Woad lost w/ L. Woad 1 dn | 1.5 | 30.0 |
