= 2016 ANA Inspiration =

Tournament information
- Dates: March 31 – April 3, 2016
- Location: Rancho Mirage, California; 33.798°N 116.433°W
- Courses: Mission Hills Country Club; Dinah Shore Tournament Course
- Tour: LPGA Tour
- Format: Stroke play - 72 holes

Statistics
- Par: 72
- Length: 6,769 yards (6,190 m)
- Field: 111 players, 73 after cut
- Cut: 146 (+2)
- Prize fund: $2.6 million
- Winner's share: $390,000

Champion
- (New Zealand) Lydia Ko
- 276 (−12)
- Location in the United States Location in California

The 2016 ANA Inspiration was the 45th ANA Inspiration, held March 31 – April 3 at the Dinah Shore Tournament Course of Mission Hills Country Club in Rancho Mirage, California. It was its 34th year as a major championship. Golf Channel televised the event for the 6th consecutive year.

Lydia Ko won by one stroke over Chun In-gee and Charley Hull.

== Field ==
Players who qualified for the event are listed below. Players are listed under the first category in which they qualified; additional qualifying categories are shown in parentheses.

1. Active LPGA Tour Hall of Fame members (must have participated in ten official LPGA Tour tournaments within the 12 months prior to the commitment deadline)

Juli Inkster (2,8), Karrie Webb (2,5,8)

2. Winners of all previous ANA Inspirations

Stacy Lewis (3,5,6,7,8,9), Brittany Lincicome (5,6,7,8,9), Inbee Park (3,5,6,7,8,9), Morgan Pressel (6,7,8,9), Lexi Thompson (5,6,7,8,9), Yani Tseng (3,8), Yoo Sun-young (8)

3. Winners of the U.S. Women's Open, Women's PGA Championship, and Ricoh Women's British Open in the previous five years

Choi Na-yeon (5,8,9), Chun In-gee (5,7,9,10), Shanshan Feng (5,6,7,8,9,10), Mo Martin (5,8), Ryu So-yeon (5,6,7,8,9), Michelle Wie (5,8)

Jiyai Shin (5,9) did not play.

4. Winners of The Evian Championship in the previous two years

Kim Hyo-joo (5,6,8,9), Lydia Ko (5,7,8,9)

5. Winners of official LPGA Tour tournaments from the 2013 Kraft Nabisco Championship through the week immediately preceding the 2016 ANA Inspiration

Brooke Henderson (7,9), M. J. Hur (8), Jang Ha-na (8,9), Jennifer Johnson, Cristie Kerr (8,9), Christina Kim (6,8), Kim Sei-young (6,7,8,9,12), Jessica Korda (8,9), Ilhee Lee (7,8), Lee Mi-hyang (6,7,8), Minjee Lee (8,9), Mirim Lee (6,8,9), Haru Nomura (8), Anna Nordqvist (6,8,9), Lee-Anne Pace (8), Park Hee-young (8), Suzann Pettersen (6,7,8,9), Beatriz Recari (8), Lizette Salas (8), Kris Tamulis (8), Amy Yang (7,8,9)

Teresa Lu (9,10) did not play.

6. All players who finished in the top-20 in the previous year's ANA Inspiration

Carlota Ciganda (8), Austin Ernst (8), Karine Icher (8), Ariya Jutanugarn (8), Moriya Jutanugarn (8), Pernilla Lindberg (7,8), Catriona Matthew (8), Stephanie Meadow, Gerina Piller (8,9), Jenny Shin (8), Angela Stanford (8)

7. All players who finished in the top-5 of the previous year's U.S. Women's Open, Women's PGA Championship, Ricoh Women's British Open and The Evian Championship

Ko Jin-young (9), Shiho Oyama, Jane Park (8)

8. Top-80 on the previous year's season-ending LPGA Tour official money list

Marina Alex, Baek Kyu-jung, Christel Boeljon, Chella Choi, Paula Creamer, Sandra Gal, Julieta Granada, Jaye Marie Green, Wei-Ling Hsu, Charley Hull, Ji Eun-hee, Danielle Kang, Kim Kaufman, In-Kyung Kim, Candie Kung, Min Seo Kwak, Brittany Lang, Alison Lee (9), Min Lee, Xi Yu Lin, Caroline Masson, Maria McBride, Sydnee Michaels, Ai Miyazato, Mika Miyazato, Azahara Muñoz, Ryann O'Toole, Pornanong Phatlum (9), Alena Sharp, Kelly Shon, Jennifer Song, Ayako Uehara, Mariajo Uribe, Sakura Yokomine

9. Top-30 on the Women's World Golf Rankings as of a March 8, 2016

Lee Bo-mee (10), Park Sung-hyun (10)

Ahn Sun-ju did not play.

10. Top-2 players from the previous year's season-ending Ladies European Tour Order of Merit, LPGA of Japan Tour money list and LPGA of Korea Tour money list

Melissa Reid

11. Top-20 players plus ties on the current year LPGA Tour official money list at the end of the last official tournament prior to the current ANA Inspiration, not otherwise qualified above, provided such players are within the top-80 positions on the current year LPGA Tour official money list at the beginning of the tournament competition

Cydney Clanton, Jacqui Concolino, Jodi Ewart Shadoff, Simin Feng, Tiffany Joh, Megan Khang, P.K. Kongkraphan, Gaby López, Annie Park, Paula Reto, Thidapa Suwannapura, Kelly Tan, Julie Yang

12. Previous year's Louise Suggs Rolex Rookie of the Year

13. Previous year's U.S. Women's Amateur champion, provided she is still an amateur at the beginning of tournament competition

Hannah O'Sullivan

14. Any LPGA Member who did not compete in the previous year's ANA Inspiration major due to injury, illness or maternity, who subsequently received a medical/maternity extension of membership from the LPGA in the previous calendar year, provided they were otherwise qualified to compete in the previous year's ANA Inspiration

Caroline Hedwall, Gwladys Nocera

15. Up to six sponsor invitations for top-ranked amateur players

Sierra Brooks, Karen Chung, Bronte Law, Andrea Lee, Leona Maguire, Albane Valenzuela

== Course layout ==
Dinah Shore Tournament Course

Hole	1	2	3	4	5	6	7	8	9	Out	10	11	12	13	14	15	16	17	18	In	Total
Yards	377	517	420	380	182	391	395	169	538	3,369	388	536	389	424	148	387	418	179	531	3,400	6,769
Par	4	5	4	4	3	4	4	3	5	36	4	5	4	4	3	4	4	3	5	36	72

== Round summaries ==
=== First round ===
Thursday, March 31, 2016

Place	Player	Score	To par
T1	(Japan) Ai Miyazato	67	−5
T1	(Spain) Azahara Muñoz	67	−5
T3	(Scotland) Catriona Matthew	68	−4
T3	(Japan) Shiho Oyama	68	−4
T3	(South Africa) Lee-Anne Pace	68	−4
T6	(South Korea) Chun In-gee	69	−3
T6	(South Korea) Jang Ha-na	69	−3
T6	(Thailand) Ariya Jutanugarn	69	−3
T6	(South Korea) Lee Mi-hyang	69	−3
T6	(United States) Ryann O'Toole	69	−3
T6	(United States) Gerina Piller	69	−3
T6	(United States) Lexi Thompson	69	−3
T6	(South Korea) Amy Yang	69	−3

=== Second round ===
Friday, April 1, 2016

Place	Player	Score	To par
T1	(Japan) Ai Miyazato	67-70=137	−7
T1	(United States) Lexi Thompson	69-68=137	−7
T3	(South Korea) Chun In-gee	69-69=138	−6
T3	(New Zealand) Lydia Ko	70-68=138	−6
T3	(South Africa) Lee-Anne Pace	68-70=138	−6
T3	(South Korea) Park Sung-hyun	71-67=138	−6
T3	(Norway) Suzann Pettersen	71-67=138	−6
T3	(United States) Lizette Salas	71-67=138	−6
T9	(South Korea) Jang Ha-na	69-70=139	−5
T9	(South Korea) Lee Bo-mee	73-66=139	−5
T9	(Australia) Minjee Lee	71-68=139	−5
T9	(United States) Michelle Wie	70-69=139	−5

=== Third round ===
Saturday, April 2, 2016

Place	Player	Score	To par
1	(United States) Lexi Thompson	69-68-69=206	−10
T2	(South Korea) Chun In-gee	69-69-69=207	−9
T2	(Thailand) Ariya Jutanugarn	69-71-67=207	−9
T2	(New Zealand) Lydia Ko	70-68-69=207	−9
T5	(England) Charley Hull	70-69-69=208	−8
T5	(Japan) Ai Miyazato	67-70-71=208	−8
T7	(Germany) Caroline Masson	70-71-68=209	−7
T7	(South Africa) Lee-Anne Pace	68-70-71=209	−7
T7	(South Korea) Park Sung-hyun	71-67-71=209	−7
T7	(Norway) Suzann Pettersen	71-67-71=209	−7
T7	(United States) Michelle Wie	70-69-70=209	−7

=== Final round ===
Sunday, April 3, 2016

Place	Player	Score	To par	Money ($)
1	(New Zealand) Lydia Ko	70-68-69-69=276	−12	390,000
T2	(South Korea) Chun In-gee	69-69-69-70=277	−11	208,182
T2	(England) Charley Hull	70-69-69-69=277	−11	208,182
4	(Thailand) Ariya Jutanugarn	69-71-67-71=278	−10	135,417
5	(United States) Lexi Thompson	69-68-69-73=279	−9	108,996
T6	(Germany) Caroline Masson	70-71-68-71=280	−8	72,004
T6	(South Korea) Inbee Park	70-73-69-68=280	−8	72,004
T6	(South Korea) Park Sung-hyun	71-67-71-71=280	−8	72,004
T6	(United States) Gerina Piller	69-71-70-70=280	−8	72,004
T10	(Canada) Brooke Henderson	73-69-72-67=281	−7	48,155
T10	(South Korea) Lee Bo-mee	73-66-72-70=281	−7	48,155
T10	(Norway) Suzann Pettersen	71-67-71-72=281	−7	48,155
T10	(South Korea) Ryu So-yeon	72-69-71-69=281	−7	48,155

==== Scorecard ====
Final round

Hole	1	2	3	4	5	6	7	8	9	10	11	12	13	14	15	16	17	18
Par	4	5	4	4	3	4	4	3	5	4	5	4	4	3	4	4	3	5
(New Zealand) Ko	−9	−9	−9	−9	−10	−10	−10	−11	−11	−11	−11	−11	−11	−11	−11	−11	−11	−12
(South Korea) Chun	−9	−9	−9	−9	−9	−9	−9	−9	−10	−11	−11	−11	−11	−11	−11	−10	−10	−11
(England) Hull	−8	−7	−7	−6	−6	−6	−6	−6	−7	−8	−9	−9	−10	−10	−10	−10	−10	−11
(Thailand) Jutanugarn	−9	−9	−10	−9	−9	−9	−10	−10	−11	−12	−13	−13	−13	−13	−13	−12	−11	−10
(United States) Thompson	−9	−9	−8	−8	−8	−8	−8	−8	−7	−7	−7	−7	−7	−7	−7	−7	−7	−9
(South Korea) Park	−4	−5	−5	−6	−6	−6	−6	−6	−7	−7	−7	−7	−8	−8	−8	−7	−7	−8
(Canada) Henderson	−3	−3	−3	−3	−4	−4	−4	−3	−3	−3	−4	−5	−5	−6	−6	−6	−6	−7
(Japan) Miyazato	−8	−8	−8	−7	−6	−6	−6	−6	−7	−7	−8	−7	−6	−6	−6	−5	−5	−5
