= 2016 LPGA Tour =

Golf tour season

2016 LPGA Tour season
- Duration: January 28, 2016 – November 20, 2016
- Number of official events: 35
- Most wins: 5 (Thailand) Ariya Jutanugarn
- Race to CME Globe Winner: (Thailand) Ariya Jutanugarn
- Money leader: (Thailand) Ariya Jutanugarn
- Vare Trophy: (South Korea) Chun In-gee
- Rolex Player of the Year: (Thailand) Ariya Jutanugarn
- Rookie of the Year: (South Korea) Chun In-gee

The 2016 LPGA Tour was a series of professional golf tournaments for elite female golfers from around the world. The season began in the Bahamas on January 28 and ended on November 20 at the Gold Course of the Tiburón Golf Club in Naples, Florida. The tournaments are sanctioned by the United States–based Ladies Professional Golf Association (LPGA).

== Schedule and results ==
The number in parentheses after each winners' name is the player's total number of wins in official money individual events on the LPGA Tour, including that event. Tournament and winner names in bold indicate LPGA majors.

Date	Tournament	Location	Winner	WWGR points	Purse ($)	Winner's share ($)
Jan 31	Pure Silk-Bahamas LPGA Classic	Bahamas	(South Korea) Kim Hyo-joo (3)	46	1,400,000	210,000
Feb 6	Coates Golf Championship	Florida	(South Korea) Jang Ha-na (1)	62	1,500,000	225,000
Feb 21	ISPS Handa Women's Australian Open	Australia	(Japan) Haru Nomura (1)	26	1,300,000	195,000
Feb 28	Honda LPGA Thailand	Thailand	(United States) Lexi Thompson (7)	62	1,600,000	240,000
Mar 6	HSBC Women's Champions	Singapore	(South Korea) Jang Ha-na (2)	62	1,500,000	225,000
Mar 20	JTBC Founders Cup	Arizona	(South Korea) Kim Sei-young (4)	62	1,500,000	225,000
Mar 27	Kia Classic	California	(New Zealand) Lydia Ko (11)	68	1,700,000	255,000
Apr 3	**ANA Inspiration**	California	(New Zealand) **Lydia Ko** (12)	100	2,600,000	390,000
Apr 16	Lotte Championship	Hawaii	(Australia) Minjee Lee (2)	50	1,800,000	270,000
Apr 24	Swinging Skirts LPGA Classic	California	(Japan) Haru Nomura (2)	62	2,000,000	300,000
May 1	Volunteers of America Texas Shootout	Texas	(South Korea) Jenny Shin (1)	50	1,300,000	195,000
May 8	Yokohama Tire LPGA Classic	Alabama	(Thailand) Ariya Jutanugarn (1)	37	1,300,000	195,000
May 22	Kingsmill Championship	Virginia	(Thailand) Ariya Jutanugarn (2)	62	1,300,000	195,000
May 29	LPGA Volvik Championship	Michigan	(Thailand) Ariya Jutanugarn (3)	53	1,300,000	195,000
Jun 5	ShopRite LPGA Classic	New Jersey	(Sweden) Anna Nordqvist (6)	26	1,500,000	225,000
Jun 12	**KPMG Women's PGA Championship**	Washington	(Canada) **Brooke Henderson** (2)	100	3,500,000	525,000
Jun 19	Meijer LPGA Classic	Michigan	(South Korea) Kim Sei-young (5)	56	2,000,000	300,000
Jun 26	Walmart NW Arkansas Championship	Arkansas	(New Zealand) Lydia Ko (13)	56	2,000,000	300,000
Jul 3	Cambia Portland Classic	Oregon	(Canada) Brooke Henderson (3)	24	1,300,000	195,000
Jul 10	**U.S. Women's Open**	California	(United States) **Brittany Lang** (2)	100	4,500,000	810,000
Jul 17	Marathon Classic	Ohio	(New Zealand) Lydia Ko (14)	34	1,500,000	225,000
Jul 24	UL International Crown	Illinois	United States	n/a	1,600,000	400,000
Jul 31	**Ricoh Women's British Open**	England	(Thailand) **Ariya Jutanugarn** (4)	100	3,000,000	412,047
Aug 20	Olympic Women's Golf Competition	Brazil	(South Korea) Inbee Park (n/a)	34	n/a	
Aug 28	Canadian Pacific Women's Open	Alberta	(Thailand) Ariya Jutanugarn (5)	62	2,250,000	337,500
Sep 4	Manulife LPGA Classic	Ontario	(Germany) Caroline Masson (1)	50	1,600,000	240,000
Sep 18	**The Evian Championship**	France	(South Korea) **Chun In-gee** (2)	100	3,250,000	487,500
Oct 2	Reignwood LPGA Classic	China	(South Korea) Kim In-kyung (4)	28	2,100,000	315,000
Oct 9	Fubon LPGA Taiwan Championship	Taiwan	(South Korea) Jang Ha-na (3)	40	2,000,000	300,000
Oct 16	LPGA KEB Hana Bank Championship	South Korea	(Spain) Carlota Ciganda (1)	62	2,000,000	300,000
Oct 23	Blue Bay LPGA	China	(Australia) Minjee Lee (3)	26	2,100,000	315,000
Oct 30	Sime Darby LPGA Malaysia	Malaysia	(China) Shanshan Feng (5)	43	1,800,000	270,000
Nov 6	Toto Japan Classic	Japan	(China) Shanshan Feng (6)	53	1,500,000	225,000
Nov 13	Citibanamex Lorena Ochoa Invitational	Mexico	(Spain) Carlota Ciganda (2)	17	1,000,000	200,000
Nov 20	CME Group Tour Championship	Florida	(England) Charley Hull (1)	62	2,000,000	500,000

== Season leaders ==
Money list leaders

Rank	Player	Country	Events	Prize money($)
1	Ariya Jutanugarn	Thailand	28	2,550,928
2	Lydia Ko	New Zealand	24	2,492,994
3	Brooke Henderson	Canada	31	1,724,409
4	Chun In-gee	South Korea	19	1,501,102
5	Shanshan Feng	China	21	1,458,579
6	Kim Sei-young	South Korea	25	1,445,937
7	Anna Nordqvist	Sweden	25	1,424,685
8	Jang Ha-na	South Korea	21	1,383,575
9	Brittany Lang	United States	28	1,259,787
10	Ryu So-yeon	South Korea	24	1,259,485

Full 2016 official money list

Scoring average leaders

Rank	Player	Country	Average
1	Chun In-gee	South Korea	69.583
2	Lydia Ko	New Zealand	69.596
3	Ariya Jutanugarn	Thailand	69.870
4	Shanshan Feng	China	69.877
5	Jang Ha-na	South Korea	69.976

Full 2016 scoring average list

== Awards ==
Award	Winner	Country
Money winner	Ariya Jutanugarn	Thailand
Scoring leader (Vare Trophy)	Chun In-gee	South Korea
Player of the Year	Ariya Jutanugarn	Thailand
Rookie of the Year	Chun In-gee	South Korea
Race to the CME Globe	Ariya Jutanugarn	Thailand

== See also ==
- 2016 Ladies European Tour
- 2016 Symetra Tour
