= Ariya Jutanugarn =

Thai professional golfer (born 1995)

Ariya Jutanugarn เอรียา จุฑานุกาล TBh
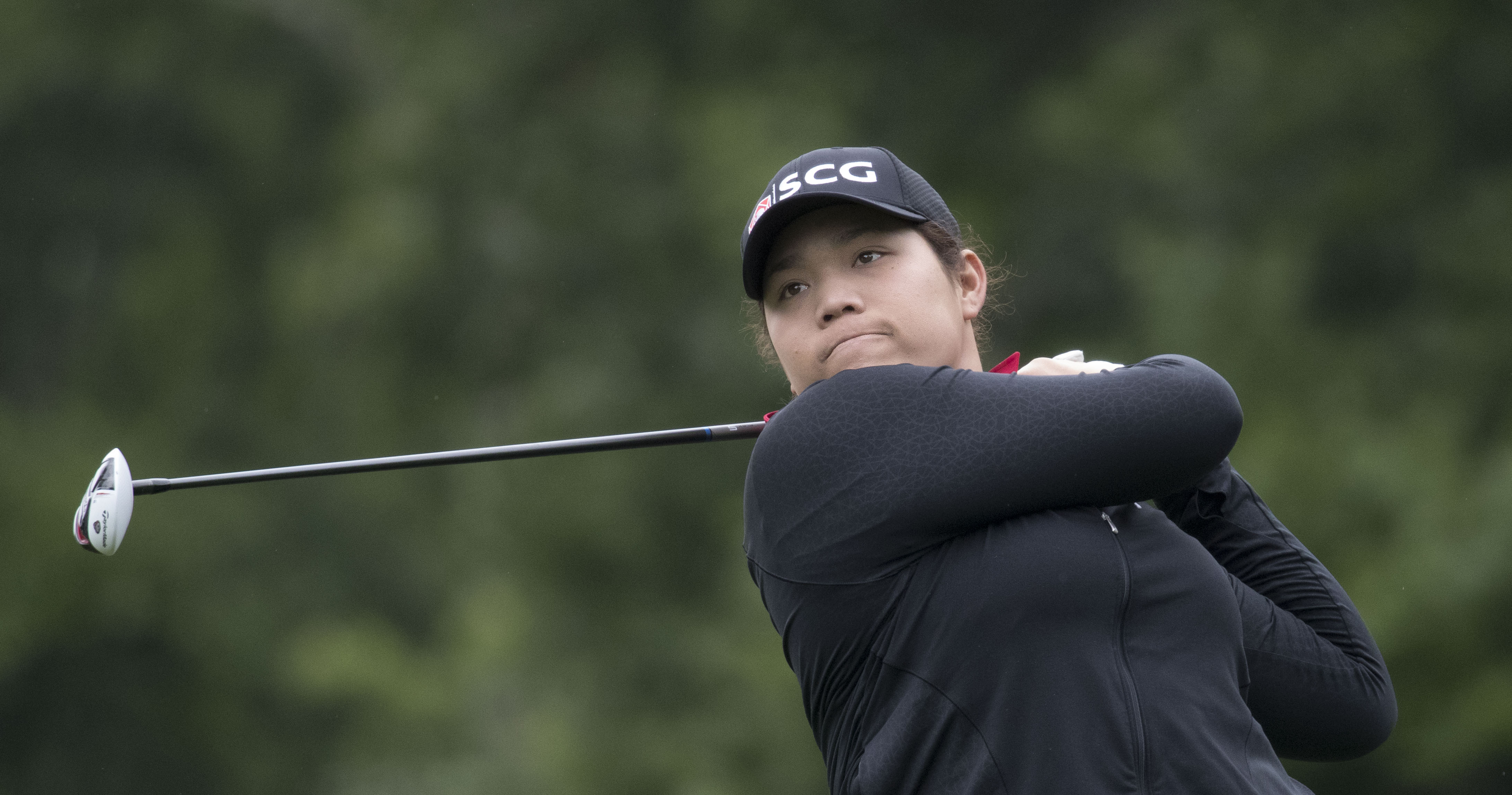
- Jutanugarn at the LPGA Kingsmill 2016

Personal information
- Nickname: May
- Nationality: Thailand
- Born: 23 November 1995 (age 30) Bangkok, Thailand
- Height: 5 ft 7 in (170 cm)

Career
- Sport: Golf
- Turned professional: 2012
- Current tours: Ladies European Tour (joined 2013); LPGA Tour (joined 2015)
- Professional wins: 13

Number of wins by tour
- LPGA Tour: 12
- Ladies European Tour: 3

Best results in LPGA major championships (wins: 2)
- Chevron Championship: T2: 2025
- Women's PGA C'ship: 3rd: 2016
- U.S. Women's Open: Won: 2018
- Women's British Open: Won: 2016
- Evian Championship: 5th: 2019

Achievements and awards
- LPGA Player of the Year: 2016, 2018
- LPGA Tour Money Winner: 2016, 2018
- Race to the CME Globe: 2016, 2018
- LPGA Vare Trophy: 2018
- GWAA Female Player of the Year: 2016, 2018
- Heather Farr Player Award: 2016
- Best Female Golfer ESPY Award: 2017
- Rolex Annika Major Award: 2018
- Thailand Professional Athlete of the Year Award: 2016, 2018
- Fox Sports Asia Woman of the Year Award: 2016

Ariya Jutanugarn (Thai: เอรียา จุฑานุกาล, RTGS: Eriya Chuthanukan, pronounced [ʔēː.rīː.jāː t͡ɕùʔ.tʰāː.núʔ.kāːn]; born 23 November 1995) is a Thai professional golfer who plays on the American-based LPGA Tour. She was born in Bangkok. She is the first golfer, male or female, from Thailand to win a major championship. She became the number one ranked golfer in the Women's World Golf Rankings in June 2017.

== Family ==
Jutanugarn has an older sister, Moriya, who is also a professional golfer. Their parents are father Somboon and mother Narumon and they have four older half-siblings through their father. The two sisters often play matches together and travel with their parents, who handle their business and financial affairs. The parents own a professional golf shop at the Rose Garden Golf Course near Bangkok.

== Career ==
Jutanugarn qualified for the 2007 Honda LPGA Thailand at age 11, making her the youngest player ever to qualify for an LPGA Tour event. As of early May 2013, she had played in three LPGA tournaments and four Ladies European Tour (LET) tournaments and had five top-4 finishes. In 2012, she was winner of the American Junior Golf Association (AFGA) girl Player of the Year for the second consecutive year. She turned professional at the end of 2012 and joined the Ladies European Tour in 2013.

Jutanugarn has an aggressive and fearless playing style. At the 2013 Honda LPGA Thailand, she led by two shots going to the final hole and lost by one shot to Korea's Inbee Park. She placed 4th one week later at the HSBC Women's Champions in Singapore. A few weeks later, she won her first professional tournament at the LET's Lalla Meryem Cup in Morocco. The win put her on top of the LET Order of Merit (money list). She led the first two days at the Kingsmill Championship in Williamsburg, Virginia in May 2013. She shot a 7-under-par on the first day.

In a practice round at the 2013 Wegmans LPGA Championship, Jutanugarn injured her shoulder by tumbling down an incline while chasing her sister Moriya with a water bottle. The injury required corrective surgery, which was performed in Bangkok.

Jutanugarn finished T-3 at the LPGA Final Qualifying Tournament to earn her tour card for 2015. At the 2016 ANA Inspiration, she had a two-stroke lead with three holes left and closed with three bogeys to finish fourth.

At the 2016 Yokohama Tire LPGA Classic, Jutanugarn earned her first LPGA Tour win and became the first Thai winner on this tour. She went on to win the next two LPGA tournaments, thereby becoming the first player in LPGA history to win her first three titles in consecutive fashion. Jutanugarn won her first major championship with a three-stroke victory at the 2016 Women's British Open.

Despite a mid-season slump in 2017 where Jutanugarn missed five cuts plus one withdrawal in a seven-tournament stretch, she still managed to win her 6th and 7th Tour titles. Her second Tour title of the year was the CME Group Tour Championship, the last event of the year, where she won $500,000 after finishing the weekend with back-to-back 67s. In addition to her two Tour wins, Jutanugarn racked up three runner-up finishes, a third place showing, and a total of 10 top-10 appearances which saw her win $1,549,858 and bringing her career total to $4,583,332. This was the second consecutive season where she earned more than $1,500,000.

In 2018, Jutanugarn won three times, including the U.S. Women's Open on 3 June 2018. On 18 November 2018, Jutanugarn won the season-long Race to the CME Globe and the $1,000,000 bonus. For the 2018 season, Jutanugarn won the LPGA Player of the Year, the LPGA Vare Trophy with a scoring average of 69.415, the Leaders Top 10 competition with 17 top-10 finishes and the LPGA money title at $2,743,949. She also set single-season records in rounds in the 60s (57) and birdies (470). She ended the 2018 season ranked number one in the world.

In May 2021, Jutanugarn won the Honda LPGA Thailand in her home country. It was her first victory since 2018. After the win, she told media that she had considered quitting golf during her winless seasons in 2019 and 2020.

== Amateur wins ==
- 2011 U.S. Girls' Junior, AJGA Rolex Girls Junior, Junior PGA Championship, Junior orange bowl international
- 2012 Canadian Women's Amateur, AJGA Rolex Girls Junior, Junior PGA Championship, AJGA Polo Golf Junior Classic, Women's Western Amateur, Thunderbird international Junior

== Professional wins (13) ==
=== LPGA Tour wins (12) ===
Legend
Major championships (2)
Other LPGA Tour (10)

| No. | Date | Tournament | Winning score | To par | Margin of victory | Runner(s)-up | Winner's share ($) |
|---|---|---|---|---|---|---|---|
| 1 | 8 May 2016 | Yokohama Tire LPGA Classic | 70-69-63-72=274 | −14 | 1 stroke | (United States) Stacy Lewis (United States) Morgan Pressel (South Korea) Amy Yang | 195,000 |
| 2 | 22 May 2016 | Kingsmill Championship | 69-69-65-67=270 | −14 | 1 stroke | (Australia) Su-Hyun Oh | 195,000 |
| 3 | 29 May 2016 | LPGA Volvik Championship | 65-68-73-67=273 | −15 | 5 strokes | (United States) Christina Kim | 195,000 |
| 4 | 31 Jul 2016 | Ricoh Women's British Open^{[1]} | 65-69-66-72=272 | −16 | 3 strokes | (South Korea) Mirim Lee (United States) Mo Martin | 412,047 |
| 5 | 28 Aug 2016 | Canadian Pacific Women's Open | 68-64-67-66=265 | −23 | 4 strokes | (South Korea) Kim Sei-young | 337,500 |
| 6 | 11 Jun 2017 | Manulife LPGA Classic | 67-70-65-69=271 | −17 | Playoff | (South Korea) Chun In-gee (United States) Lexi Thompson | 255,000 |
| 7 | 19 Nov 2017 | CME Group Tour Championship | 68-71-67-67=273 | −15 | 1 stroke | (United States) Jessica Korda (United States) Lexi Thompson | 500,000 |
| 8 | 20 May 2018 | Kingsmill Championship (2) | 66-67-66=199 | −14 | Playoff | (South Korea) Chun In-gee (Japan) Nasa Hataoka | 195,000 |
| 9 | 3 Jun 2018 | U.S. Women's Open | 67-70-67-73=277 | −11 | Playoff | (South Korea) Kim Hyo-joo | 900,000 |
| 10 | 29 Jul 2018 | Aberdeen Standard Investments Ladies Scottish Open^{[1]} | 67-65-73-66=271 | −13 | 1 stroke | (Australia) Minjee Lee | 225,000 |
| 11 | 9 May 2021 | Honda LPGA Thailand | 65-69-69-63=266 | −22 | 1 stroke | (Thailand) Atthaya Thitikul | 240,000 |
| 12 | 17 Jul 2021 | Dow Great Lakes Bay Invitational (with (Thailand) Moriya Jutanugarn) | 67-59-71-59=256 | −24 | 3 strokes | (United States) Cydney Clanton and (Thailand) Thidapa Suwannapura | 279,500 (each) |

^{1} Co-sanctioned by the Ladies European Tour.

LPGA Tour playoff record (3–3)

| No. | Year | Tournament | Opponent(s) | Result |
|---|---|---|---|---|
| 1 | 2015 | Pure Silk-Bahamas LPGA Classic | (South Korea) Kim Sei-young (South Korea) Yoo Sun-young | Kim won with birdie on first extra hole |
| 2 | 2016 | Marathon Classic | (New Zealand) Lydia Ko (South Korea) Mirim Lee | Ko won with birdie on fourth extra hole |
| 3 | 2017 | Manulife LPGA Classic | (South Korea) Chun In-gee (United States) Lexi Thompson | Won with birdie on first extra hole |
| 4 | 2018 | Kingsmill Championship | (South Korea) Chun In-gee (Japan) Nasa Hataoka | Won with birdie on second extra hole Chun eliminated by birdie on first hole |
| 5 | 2018 | U.S. Women's Open | (South Korea) Kim Hyo-joo | Tied two-hole aggregate playoff Won with par on second hole of sudden-death playoff: Jutanugarn : 4-4-4-4=16 (E), Kim : 3-5-4-5=17 (+1) |
| 6 | 2025 | Chevron Championship | (United States) Lindy Duncan (South Korea) Kim Hyo-joo (Japan) Mao Saigo (China) Yin Ruoning | Saigo won with birdie on first extra hole |

=== Ladies European Tour wins (3) ===
| No. | Date | Tournament | Winning score | To par | Margin of victory | Runner(s)-up |
|---|---|---|---|---|---|---|
| 1 | 31 Mar 2013 | Lalla Meryem Cup | 69-67-67-67=270 | −14 | 3 strokes | (United States) Beth Allen, (England) Charley Hull |
| 2 | 31 Jul 2016 | Ricoh Women's British Open | 65-69-66-72=272 | −16 | 3 strokes | (South Korea) Mirim Lee, (United States) Mo Martin |
| 3 | 29 Jul 2018 | Aberdeen Standard Investments Ladies Scottish Open | 67-65-73-66=271 | −13 | 1 stroke | (Australia) Minjee Lee |

== Major championships ==
=== Wins (2) ===
| Year | Championship | 54 holes | Winning score | Margin | Runner(s)-up |
|---|---|---|---|---|---|
| 2016 | Women's British Open | 2 shot lead | −16 (65-69-66-72=272) | 3 strokes | (South Korea) Mirim Lee, (United States) Mo Martin |
| 2018 | U.S. Women's Open | 4 shot lead | −11 (67-70-67-73=277) | Playoff^{1} | (South Korea) Kim Hyo-joo |

^{1} Defeated Kim in a two-hole aggregate playoff followed by a sudden-death playoff: Jutanugarn (4-4-4-4=16) and Kim (3-5-4-5=17)

=== Results timeline ===
Results not in chronological order.

| Tournament | 2010 | 2011 | 2012 | 2013 | 2014 | 2015 | 2016 | 2017 | 2018 | 2019 |
|---|---|---|---|---|---|---|---|---|---|---|
| Chevron Championship | | T25LA | T22LA | | | T20 | 4 | T8 | T4 | T61 |
| Women's PGA Championship | | | | | | CUT | 3 | CUT | T40 | T10 |
| U.S. Women's Open | CUT | CUT | | | | CUT | T17 | CUT | 1 | T26 |
| The Evian Championship ^ | | | | | | T46 | T9 | CUT | 36 | 5 |
| Women's British Open | | | | | T45 | CUT | 1 | CUT | T4 | T11 |

| Tournament | 2020 | 2021 | 2022 | 2023 | 2024 | 2025 | 2026 |
|---|---|---|---|---|---|---|---|
| Chevron Championship | T11 | T60 | T53 | T14 | CUT | T2 | CUT |
| U.S. Women's Open | T9 | T7 | CUT | CUT | CUT | T9 | T60 |
| Women's PGA Championship | T37 | T46 | T54 | T24 | T32 | T52 | CUT |
| The Evian Championship ^ | NT | T19 | CUT | T28 | T35 | T7 | T16 |
| Women's British Open | T22 | T10 | T28 | CUT | 6 | T23 | T53 |

^ The Evian Championship was added as a major in 2013.

Win
Top 10
Did not play

LA = low amateur
CUT = missed the half-way cut
NT = no tournament
"T" = tied

=== Summary ===
| Tournament | Wins | 2nd | 3rd | Top-5 | Top-10 | Top-25 | Events | Cuts made |
|---|---|---|---|---|---|---|---|---|
| Chevron Championship | 0 | 1 | 0 | 3 | 4 | 9 | 13 | 11 |
| U.S. Women's Open | 1 | 0 | 0 | 1 | 4 | 5 | 14 | 7 |
| Women's PGA Championship | 0 | 0 | 1 | 1 | 2 | 3 | 12 | 9 |
| The Evian Championship | 0 | 0 | 0 | 1 | 3 | 5 | 11 | 9 |
| Women's British Open | 1 | 0 | 0 | 2 | 4 | 7 | 13 | 10 |
| Totals | 2 | 1 | 1 | 8 | 17 | 29 | 62 | 45 |

- Most consecutive cuts made – 20 (2018 ANA – 2022 Chevron)
- Longest streak of top-10s – 3 (twice)

== LPGA Tour career summary ==
| Year | Starts | Cuts made* | Wins (Majors) | 2nd | 3rd | Top-10 | Best finish | Earnings ($) | Money list rank | Scoring average | Scoring rank |
|---|---|---|---|---|---|---|---|---|---|---|---|
| 2007^{a} | 1 | 1 | 0 | 0 | 0 | 0 | T51 | 0 | n/a | 74.25 | n/a |
| 2011^{a} | 3 | 2 | 0 | 0 | 0 | 1 | T8 | 0 | n/a | 73.00 | n/a |
| 2012^{a} | 4 | 3 | 0 | 0 | 0 | 1 | T9 | 0 | n/a | 71.24 | n/a |
| 2013^{n} | 5 | 5 | 0 | 1 | 2 | 5 | 2 | 0 | n/a | 68.55 | n/a |
| 2014^{n} | 10 | 8 | 0 | 0 | 0 | 0 | 16 | 0 | n/a | 72.46 | n/a |
| 2015 | 29 | 17 | 0 | 1 | 0 | 4 | T2 | 482,527 | 35 | 72.10 | 64 |
| 2016 | 28 | 27 | 5 (1) | 1 | 2 | 16 | 1 | 2,550,928 | 1 | 69.87 | 3 |
| 2017 | 27 | 21 | 2 | 3 | 1 | 10 | 1 | 1,549,858 | 5 | 70.66 | 28 |
| 2018 | 28 | 28 | 3 (1) | 3 | 2 | 17 | 1 | 2,743,949 | 1 | 69.41 | 1 |
| 2019 | 29 | 28 | 0 | 1 | 2 | 10 | 2 | 1,242,838 | 11 | 70.00 | 11 |
| 2020 | 13 | 10 | 0 | 0 | 0 | 3 | T6 | 368,414 | 32 | 71.94 | 65 |
| 2021 | 23 | 20 | 2 | 0 | 1 | 7 | 1 | 1,260,430 | 8 | 70.08 | 15 |
| 2022 | 27 | 19 | 0 | 0 | 0 | 2 | 7 | 405,384 | 63 | 71.34 | 69 |
| 2023 | 24 | 18 | 0 | 1 | 1 | 5 | 2 | 923,884 | 30 | 70.80 | 35 |
| 2024 | 26 | 20 | 0 | 0 | 1 | 5 | T3 | 1,079,076 | 31 | 71.04 | 37 |
| 2025 | 17 | 15 | 0 | 1 | 1 | 6 | T2 | 1,528,209 | 24 | 70.76 | 38 |
| Totals^ | 271 | 220 | 12 (2) | 12 | 13 | 85 | 1 | 14,135,516 | 17 | | |

^{a} Competed as an amateur
^{n} Not a member of the LPGA Tour until 2015
^ Official as of 2025 season, excluding events played as an amateur and non-member
*Includes matchplay and other tournaments without a cut.

== World ranking ==
Position in Women's World Golf Rankings at the end of each calendar year.

| Year | World ranking | Source |
|---|---|---|
| 2014 | 106 | |
| 2015 | 63 | |
| 2016 | 2 | |
| 2017 | 6 | |
| 2018 | 1 | |
| 2019 | 12 | |
| 2020 | 21 | |
| 2021 | 24 | |
| 2022 | 73 | |
| 2023 | 53 | |
| 2024 | 43 | |
| 2025 | 21 | |

== Team appearances ==
Amateur

- Asian Games (representing Thailand): 2010

Professional

- International Crown (representing Thailand): 2014, 2016, 2018, 2023 (winners)
- Amata Friendship Cup (representing Thailand): 2018 (winners)

== Royal decorations ==
- 2016 – Companion (Fourth Class) of The Most Admirable Order of the Direkgunabhorn
- 2017 – Commander (Third Class) of The Most Admirable Order of the Direkgunabhorn

== See also ==
- List of golfers with most LPGA major championship wins
- List of golfers with most LPGA Tour wins

Awards and achievements
| Preceded by Lydia Ko; Park Sung-hyun & Ryu So-yeon | LPGA Player of the Year; 2016; 2018 | Succeeded by Park Sung-hyun & Ryu So-yeon; Ko Jin-young |
| Preceded by Lydia Ko; Park Sung-hyun | LPGA Tour Money Winner; 2016; 2018 | Succeeded by Park Sung-hyun; Ko Jin-young |
| Preceded by Lydia Ko; Lexi Thompson | Race to the CME Globe Winner; 2016; 2018 | Succeeded by Lexi Thompson; Kim Sei-young |
| Preceded by Lydia Ko | GWAA Female Player of the Year; 2016 | Succeeded by Lexi Thompson |
| Preceded by Stephanie Meadow | Heather Farr Player Award; 2016 | Succeeded by Tiffany Joh |
| Preceded by Chanathip Songkrasin; Wisaksil Wangek | Thailand Professional Athlete of the Year; 2016; 2018 | Succeeded by Wisaksil Wangek; Incumbent |
| Preceded by Lexi Thompson | LPGA Vare Trophy; 2018 | Succeeded by Ko Jin-young |
| Preceded by Ryu So-yeon | Rolex Annika Major Award; 2018 | Succeeded by Ko Jin-young |
