= Lydia Ko =

New Zealand professional golfer (born 1997)

Dame Lydia Ko DNZM OLY
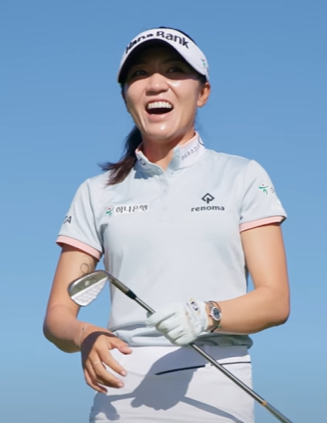
- Ko in 2024

Personal information
- Full name: Bo-Gyung "Lydia" Ko
- Nickname: Lyds
- Nationality: New Zealand
- Born: 24 April 1997 (age 29) Seoul, South Korea
- Height: 5 ft 5 in (165 cm)
- Spouse: Chung Jun (m. 2022)

Career
- Sport: Golf
- College: Korea University
- Turned professional: 2013
- Current tour: LPGA Tour
- Professional wins: 31

Number of wins by tour
- LPGA Tour: 23
- Ladies European Tour: 8
- LPGA of Korea Tour: 1
- WPGA Tour of Australasia: 5
- Other: 1

Best results in LPGA major championships (wins: 3)
- Chevron Championship: Won: 2016
- Women's PGA C'ship: 2nd: 2016
- U.S. Women's Open: T3: 2016
- Women's British Open: Won: 2024
- Evian Championship: Won: 2015

Achievements and awards
- Mark H. McCormack Medal: 2011, 2012, 2013
- Halberg Supreme Award: 2013, 2024
- New Zealand Sportswoman of the Year: 2013, 2014, 2015, 2024
- LPGA Vare Trophy: 2021, 2022
- LPGA Player of the Year: 2015, 2022
- LPGA Tour Money Winner: 2015, 2022
- LPGA Rookie of the Year: 2014
- Rolex Annika Major Award: 2016
- Best Female Golfer ESPY Award: 2015, 2016
- Race to the CME Globe: 2014, 2015, 2022
- (For a full list of awards, see here)
Medal record
Olympic Games
Gold medal – first place	2024 Paris	Individual
Silver medal – second place	2016 Rio de Janeiro	Individual
Bronze medal – third place	2020 Tokyo	Individual

- Lydia Ko
- Hangul: 고보경
- Hanja: 高寶璟
- RR: Go Bogyeong
- MR: Ko Pogyŏng

Dame Lydia Bo-Gyung Ko (born 24 April 1997) is a New Zealand professional golfer, member of the LPGA Hall of Fame, and the reigning Olympic champion. She is a three-time major winner and first reached number one in the Women's World Golf Rankings on 2 February 2015 at 17 years, 9 months and 9 days of age, making her the youngest player of either gender to be ranked number one in professional golf.

Ko found success from an early age on the LPGA Tour. Until 2017, she was the youngest ever (age 15) to win an LPGA Tour event. In August 2013, she became the only amateur to win two LPGA Tour events. Upon winning The Evian Championship in France on 13 September 2015, she became the youngest woman, at age 18 years, 4 months and 20 days, to win a major championship. Her closing round of 63 was a record lowest final round in the history of women's golf majors, but she lowered that record with a 62 at the 2021 ANA Inspiration. She had previously won the ANA Inspiration on 3 April 2016 for her second consecutive major championship.

In 2014, Ko was named as one of Time magazine's 100 most influential people. In both 2014 and 2015, Ko was named in the EspnW Impact25 list of 25 athletes and influencers who have made the greatest impact for women in sports.

In 2016, Ko was named Young New Zealander of the Year, and in the 2019 New Year Honours, she was appointed a Member of the New Zealand Order of Merit for services to golf.

In November 2022, Ko won the CME Group Tour Championship with its $2 million first-place prize, and was awarded the LPGA Player of the Year award for the second time in her career. She also won the Vare Trophy for the lowest scoring average.

In August 2024, Ko won the gold medal in women's golf at the 2024 Summer Olympics, a victory that qualified her for the LPGA Hall of Fame, the 35th and youngest inductee at age 27. Combined with her bronze medal from the Tokyo 2020 Olympics and silver medal from the Rio 2016 Olympics, she attained the complete set of Olympic medals, becoming the first golfer in the modern era to achieve all three medals at three different Olympic Games.

Ko is a player director on the LPGA Board.

Ko was made a Dame Companion of the New Zealand Order of Merit in the 2025 New Year Honours, for services to golf. She is believed to be the youngest dame or knight of the modern era.

== Early life and education ==
Ko was born on 24 April 1997 in Seoul, South Korea, and emigrated with her family to New Zealand when she was four, gaining New Zealand citizenship at age 12. She began playing golf as a five-year-old when her mother took her into a pro shop at the Pupuke Golf Club on Auckland's North Shore owned by professional Guy Wilson, who coached her until 22 December 2013. She was a seven-year-old in March 2005 when she first came to the attention of the media, for competing in the New Zealand national amateur championships. She was educated at Mairangi Bay Primary and Pinehurst School in Albany, New Zealand, and when she joined the professional golf tour she took correspondence classes with Pinehurst. Starting in 2015 Ko said she would study psychology extramurally with Korea University, Seoul. The Yonhap news agency reported her as saying "I'll have to listen to what the university says to decide how I will do my studies. I'll have to make sure I submit the required papers and projects as the majority of my classes will be done online."

== 2012 Women's NSW Open ==
On 29 January 2012, Ko became the youngest person ever to win a professional golf tour event by winning the Bing Lee/Samsung Women's NSW Open on the ALPG Tour. She was 14 at the time, and had placed second in the event the year before. The previous youngest person ever to win a professional golf tour event was Japan's Ryo Ishikawa at age 15 years and 8 months. Her record as the youngest winner of a professional event was broken later in 2012 by 14-year-old Canadian Brooke Henderson, who won the second event on that year's Canadian Women's Tour on 13 June.

== 2012 and 2013 CN Canadian Women's Open ==
On 26 August 2012, at the age of 15 years and four months, Ko became the youngest-ever winner of an LPGA Tour event, winning with a score of 275 (−13) at the CN Canadian Women's Open. She surpassed the record set by Lexi Thompson at 16 years and seven months in September 2011. Her win also made her only the fifth amateur to have won an LPGA Tour event, and the first in over 43 years. The 2012 CN Canadian Women's Open was a 72-hole event with a purse of $2 million; the winner's share of $300,000 went to runner-up Inbee Park who was three strokes back.

Ko successfully defended her win at the 2013 CN Canadian Open, shooting 265 (−15) for a five-stroke victory over Karine Icher at the Royal Mayfair Club in Edmonton. The $300,000 winner's share went to Icher.

== Professional career ==
After finishing runner-up to Suzann Pettersen in The Evian Championship in France, Ko announced that she would turn pro in 2014. However, on 23 October 2013, she stated in a YouTube video featuring New Zealand rugby player Israel Dagg that she was turning professional immediately and would play her first professional tournament in Florida in mid-November. She had been the top-ranked woman amateur golfer in the world for 130 weeks when she announced she was turning professional on 23 October 2013. She finished tied for 21st in her pro debut at the 2013 CME Group Titleholders.

In October 2013, the LPGA Tour granted Ko's request to join the LPGA, waiving the Tour's requirement of members being at least 18 years old. "It is not often that the LPGA welcomes a rookie who is already a back-to-back LPGA Tour champion," tour commissioner Mike Whan said when he granted Ko's request.

In November 2013, Ko began working with swing coach David Leadbetter.

=== 2014 ===
Ko won three tournaments in 2014. On 27 April 2014, she earned her first LPGA Tour win as a professional and her first win on U.S. soil, by winning the Swinging Skirts LPGA Classic. She celebrated her 17th birthday during this tournament. In July, she won her second tournament of the year, the Marathon Classic. In November 2014, she won her third tournament of the season, the season ending CME Group Tour Championship. She won the LPGA Rookie of the Year. Ko commemorated the occasion with the inscription "IV-XXVII-XIV" (4-27-14 in Roman numerals), on her right wrist.

=== 2015 ===
Ko won five times in 2015. On 2 February 2015, she became the No. 1 ranked woman professional golfer after a runner-up finish at the Coates Golf Championship, overtaking Inbee Park. On 22 February 2015, Ko won her first event of the 2015 LPGA Tour season at the ISPS Handa Women's Australian Open. The win was her sixth on the LPGA Tour, and her ninth victory overall. The following week, Ko returned home and won her tenth professional championship at the ISPS Handa New Zealand Women's Open. The victory in this tournament was her second of the 2015 season, the win was also her third on the Ladies European Tour, and fourth with ALPG Tour. Highlighted in her victory at New Zealand was her LET low-round tying and course record 61 during the second round.

At the first major of the 2015 season, the ANA Inspiration, Ko shot a 1-under-par 71 in the first round on 2 April, tying her with Annika Sörenstam for the all-time LPGA record for consecutive rounds under par, at 29. Three weeks later, Ko would win her second LPGA Tour event of the 2015 season, when she beat Morgan Pressel in a playoff to win the Swinging Skirts LPGA Classic. She would defeat Pressel with birdie on the second playoff hole. The victory was her seventh overall on tour, and her second win at the event in as many years. Her win was also her third win worldwide in 2015. The victory would be the second time she has defended a championship on tour. The playoff win was also her second on tour, bringing her playoff record to 2–0. Ko would go on to miss the cut at the 2015 KPMG Women's PGA Championship. The missed cut would be her first in her fourteen major championship appearances. She would find solid success in her next two major championships with a T12 finish at the 2015 U.S. Women's Open, and a T3 finish at the 2015 Ricoh Women's British Open.

On 23 August 2015, Ko won her third Canadian Pacific Women's Open in a playoff against Stacy Lewis. She defeated Lewis, with par on the first hole of the playoff. The victory was the eighth for Ko on the LPGA Tour, and the third of the 2015 season, and fourth win worldwide for her in 2015. The playoff victory was also her third win in such circumstances, and would bring her career LPGA playoff record to 3–0.

On 13 September 2015, Ko won the fifth and final major on the 2015 LPGA calendar, the 2015 Evian Championship. She dominated the final round with eight birdies, winning by six shots over second-place finisher Lexi Thompson. Her 63 was the lowest-ever closing round score in a women's major championship. It was Ko's fourth win on the LPGA Tour in 2015, ninth on the LPGA Tour overall and fourth on the Ladies European Tour. Ko's victory also made her the youngest major champion in the history of the LPGA Tour and the youngest major champion in golf since Young Tom Morris, when he won the 1868 Open Championship.

On 26 October 2015, Ko became the youngest player to win 10 events on a major tour at age 18 years, 6 months and 2 days surpassing Horton Smith who set the PGA Tour mark of 21 years, 7 months in 1929, and Nancy Lopez who set the previous LPGA Tour record in 1979 at 22 years, 2 months, 5 days.

On 22 November 2015, Ko won the LPGA Rolex Player of the Year Award by two points over Inbee Park, making her the youngest winner in the 49 years of the award.

=== 2016 ===
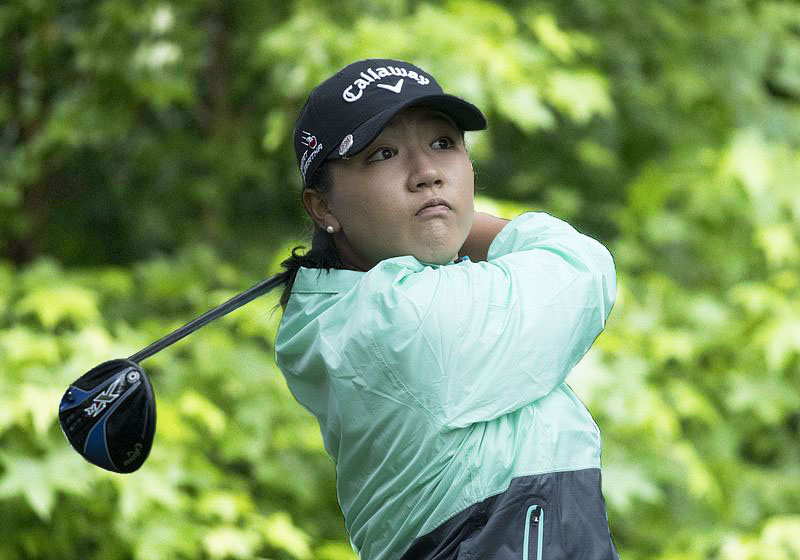
Ko at the 2016 Kingsmill Championship

Ko won four times in 2016. She won the ISPS Handa New Zealand Women's Open for a third time in four years by two shots from Choi Hye-jin, Felicity Johnson, and Nanna Koerstz Madsen. Just eleven minutes before she was due to tee off for her final round, an earthquake struck, with Ko offering to donate her prize money to charity to help those affected.

On the 2016 LPGA Tour, Ko won the Kia Classic in March with a four-shot margin over Inbee Park, and the following week, on 3 April, she made it consecutive major titles with a one-shot victory at the ANA Inspiration. The win strengthened her position as number one in the world as she became the youngest double-major winner since Young Tom Morris at the 1869 Open Championship. She added two more victories on the LPGA Tour at the Walmart NW Arkansas Championship and Marathon Classic. In August, she represented New Zealand at the 2016 Rio de Janeiro Summer Olympics, where she won the silver medal. Ko was runner-up for the Vare Trophy (lowest scoring average) for a second consecutive year, ending 0.013 behind winner Chun In-gee.

Following the 2016 season, Ko announced that she had signed an equipment sponsorship contract with Parson's Xtreme Golf (PXG), ending her use of Callaway equipment. Ko also announced in December that she had parted ways with both her caddie and swing coach David Leadbetter, who had been coaching Ko since November 2013.

=== 2017 ===
Ko entered 26 events and finished in the top-10 ten times. Her year-end world ranking dropped to ninth. She recorded three consecutive top-10 finishes at the Honda LPGA Thailand, HSBC Women's Champions, and the Bank of Hope Founders Cup. At the 2017 ANA Inspiration event, she opened with two rounds of 70, followed by a third-round 71, ana final round of 70 to finish in a tie for 11th place. She closed with rounds of 65 and 64 to finish tied for second place at the Lotte Championship. She had back-to-back top-10 finishes at the Citibanamex Lorena Ochoa Match Play and Kingsmill Championship where she ended tied-9th and tied-10th, respectively.

Ko ended the 2017 LPGA Tour with total season earnings of $1,177,450 which put her at number 13 on the season's money list. This was the fourth consecutive season in which she won at least $1,000,000.

After just 14 LPGA tournaments (22 worldwide tournaments), Ko broke into the Rolex Rankings top-10 at No. 7 by winning her second Tour title on 25 August 2013. She has remained in the Rolex Rankings top-10 for the last 231 consecutive weeks (or 4 years, 4 months and 27 days), as of 22 January 2018. Then after her first 44 LPGA tournaments, Ko ascended to the world No. 1 ranking for the first time on 2 February 2015. She was the world No. 1 for 85 weeks until June 2017.

=== 2018 ===
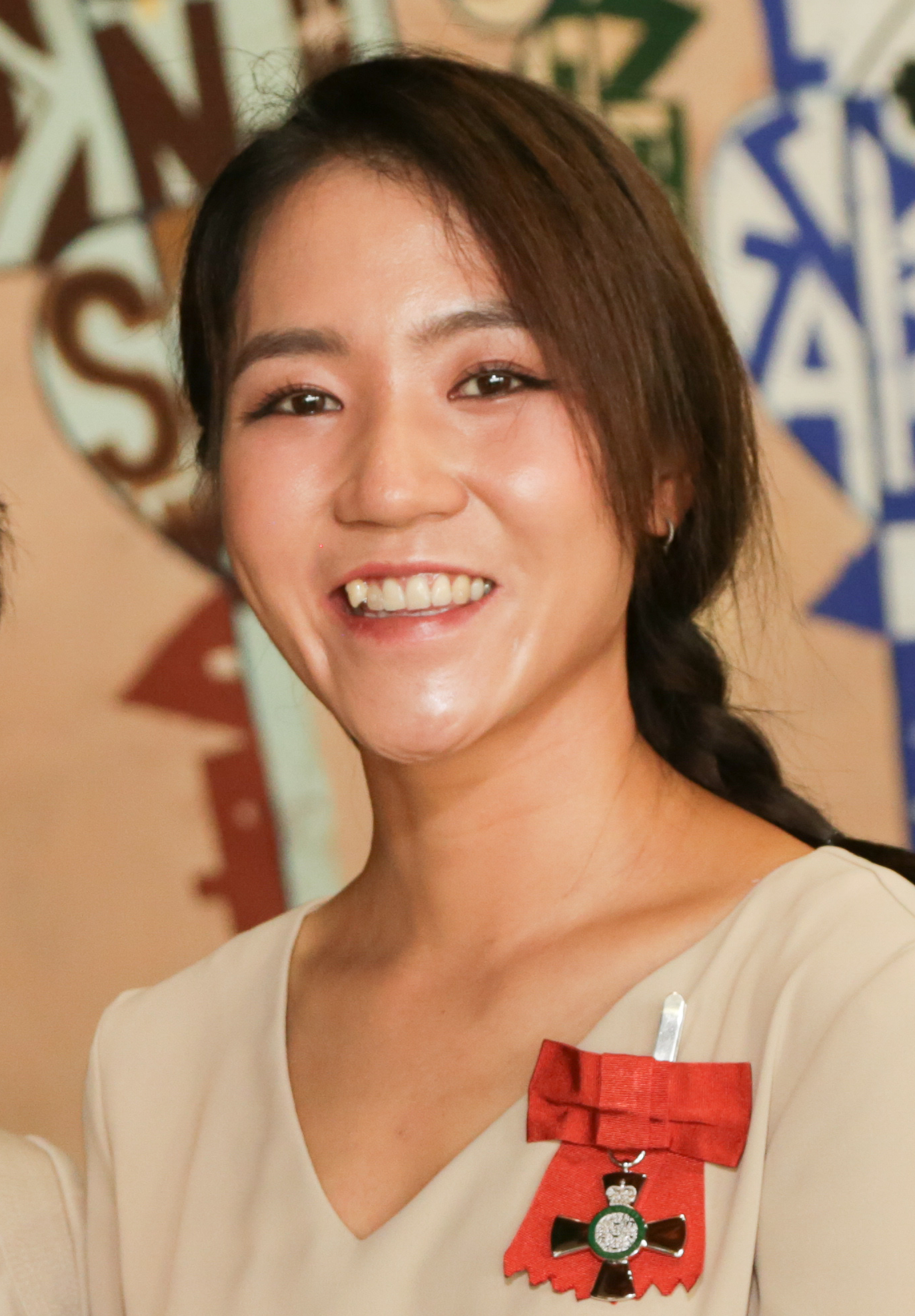
Lydia Ko, invested as a Member of the New Zealand Order of Merit in 2019

Ko entered 26 tournaments, won once, at the LPGA Mediheal Championship, and finished in the top-10 ten times. For her services to golf, Ko was named a Member of the New Zealand Order of Merit in December.

=== 2019 ===
Ko entered 24 events and finished in the top-10 four times.

=== 2020 ===
Ko entered 13 tournaments and finished in the top-10 four times.

=== 2021 ===
Ko entered 20 LPGA events, winning once. In April, she won her first LPGA Tour event since 2018 at the 2021 Lotte Championship, Hawaii.

In August, Ko represented New Zealand at the covid-delayed Tokyo Summer Olympics, where she won a bronze medal.

Ko won the 2021 Vare Trophy for the lowest scoring average on the LPGA Tour. She closed the trophy out in November by finishing second in a playoff at the Pelican Women's Championship and shooting a final round 64 to finish in the top 10 at the CME Group Tour Championship. Nelly Korda and Ko Jin-young both finished the year with lower scoring averages than Ko but neither completed the required 70 rounds over the season to be eligible for the trophy.

=== 2022 ===
Ko entered 22 tournaments and won three times. She secured her 17th LPGA win on 30 January at the Gainbridge LPGA at Boca Rio, beating Danielle Kang by one stroke in a back-and-forth lead in the fourth round. She claimed her 18th LPGA win on 23 October, at the BMW Ladies Championship in Wonju, South Korea.

In November, Ko won the CME Group Tour Championship and the record $2 million first prize. With the win, Ko won the season's money title, Vare Trophy for lowest scoring average and the LPGA Player of the Year for 2022.

On 28 November, she returned to the number one ranking for the first time since 2017.

=== 2023 ===
Ko entered 24 tournaments and won once. In February, Ko won the Aramco Saudi Ladies International in Saudi Arabia for the second time. The purse for this Ladies European Tour event was larger than that of all non-major tournaments on the LPGA Tour and the Ladies European Tour, providing $750,000 as Ko's winning award. In December, Ko won the inaugural Grant Thornton Invitational mixed team tournament with playing partner Jason Day.

=== 2024 ===
Ko entered 21 LPGA and Olympic events, winning 4 times. In January, Ko secured her first LPGA Tour title since 2022 by winning the Hilton Grand Vacations Tournament of Champions.

On 10 August 2024, she won the gold medal in women's golf at the Paris 2024 Summer Olympics, giving her a complete set of Olympic medals – silver, bronze and gold – the only golfer in the modern era to achieve all three medals at three different Olympic Games. The gold medal win qualified her to become the 35th and youngest inductee into the LPGA Hall of Fame.

Two weeks later, Ko claimed the AIG Women's Open at Old Course at St Andrews, her third major championship.

In September, she won the Kroger Queen City Championship, the first time since 2016 that she won back-to-back LPGA Tour events.

In December, she was named a Dame Companion of the New Zealand Order of Merit (DNZM) for her services to golf, one of New Zealand's highest civil honors. In New Zealand and the Commonwealth – where Dame is the female equivalent of a Knight, Ko became the youngest person ever at the age of 27 to be appointed a Dame.

=== 2025 ===
Ko entered 16 tournaments, winning once. In March, Ko won the HSBC Women's World Championship in Singapore.

=== 2026 ===
At the 2026 Ford Championship in March, Ko posted a first round score of 60, a career low single-round score.

== Personal life ==
On 30 December 2022, Ko married Chung Jun, the son of the Hyundai Card Vice Chairman Chung Tae-young, at the Myeongdong Cathedral in Seoul.

== Amateur wins ==
- 2011 Australian Women's Amateur Stroke Play Championship, New Zealand Women's Amateur Strokeplay Championship, New Zealand Women's Amateur Matchplay Championship
- 2012 Australian Women's Amateur, U.S. Women's Amateur, Espirito Santo Trophy (top individual)

== Professional wins (31) ==
=== LPGA Tour wins (23) ===
Legend
Major championships (3)
Other LPGA Tour (20)

No.	Date	Tournament	Winning score	To par	Margin of victory	Runner(s)-up
1	26 Aug 2012	CN Canadian Women's Open^{[1]}	68-68-72-67=275	−13	3 strokes	(South Korea) Inbee Park
2	25 Aug 2013	CN Canadian Women's Open^{[1]} (2)	65-69-67-64=265	−15	5 strokes	(France) Karine Icher
3	27 Apr 2014	Swinging Skirts LPGA Classic	68-71-68-69=276	−12	1 stroke	(United States) Stacy Lewis
4	20 Jul 2014	Marathon Classic	67-67-70-65=269	−15	1 stroke	(South Korea) Ryu So-yeon
5	23 Nov 2014	CME Group Tour Championship	71-71-68-68=278	−10	Playoff	(Spain) Carlota Ciganda (Paraguay) Julieta Granada
6	22 Feb 2015	ISPS Handa Women's Australian Open^{[2]}^{[3]}	70-70-72-71=283	−9	2 strokes	(South Korea) Amy Yang
7	26 Apr 2015	Swinging Skirts LPGA Classic (2)	67-72-71-70=280	−8	Playoff	(United States) Morgan Pressel
8	23 Aug 2015	Canadian Pacific Women's Open (3)	67-68-69-72=276	−12	Playoff	(United States) Stacy Lewis
9	13 Sep 2015	The Evian Championship^{[2]}	69-69-67-63=268	−16	6 strokes	(United States) Lexi Thompson
10	25 Oct 2015	Fubon LPGA Taiwan Championship	69-67-67-65=268	−20	9 strokes	(South Korea) Ji Eun-hee (South Korea) Ryu So-yeon
11	27 Mar 2016	Kia Classic	68-67-67-67=269	−19	4 strokes	(South Korea) Inbee Park
12	3 Apr 2016	ANA Inspiration	70-68-69-69=276	−12	1 stroke	(South Korea) Chun In-gee (England) Charley Hull
13	26 Jun 2016	Walmart NW Arkansas Championship	66-62-68=196	−17	3 strokes	(Taiwan) Candie Kung (United States) Morgan Pressel
14	17 Jul 2016	Marathon Classic (2)	68-66-67-69=270	−14	Playoff	(Thailand) Ariya Jutanugarn (South Korea) Mirim Lee
15	29 Apr 2018	LPGA Mediheal Championship	68-70-67-71=276	−12	Playoff	(Australia) Minjee Lee
16	17 Apr 2021	Lotte Championship	67-63-65-65=260	−28	7 strokes	(South Korea) Kim Sei-young (United States) Nelly Korda (Republic of Ireland) Leona Maguire (South Korea) Inbee Park
17	30 Jan 2022	Gainbridge LPGA at Boca Rio	63-70-72-69=274	−14	1 stroke	(United States) Danielle Kang
18	23 Oct 2022	BMW Ladies Championship	68-68-66-65=267	−21	4 strokes	(United States) Andrea Lee
19	20 Nov 2022	CME Group Tour Championship (2)	65-66-70-70=271	−17	2 strokes	(Republic of Ireland) Leona Maguire
20	21 Jan 2024	Hilton Grand Vacations Tournament of Champions	69-67-68-70=274	−14	2 strokes	(United States) Alexa Pano
21	25 Aug 2024	AIG Women's Open^{[2]}	71-70-71-69=281	−7	2 strokes	(United States) Nelly Korda (South Korea) Jiyai Shin (United States) Lilia Vu (China) Yin Ruoning
22	22 Sep 2024	Kroger Queen City Championship	67-66-69-63=265	−23	5 strokes	(Thailand) Jeeno Thitikul
23	2 Mar 2025	HSBC Women's World Championship	71-67-68-69=275	–13	4 strokes	(Japan) Ayaka Furue (Thailand) Jeeno Thitikul

^{1} Ko won the 2012 and 2013 CN Canadian Women's Opens as an amateur.
^{2} Co-sanctioned by the Ladies European Tour.
^{3} Co-sanctioned by the ALPG Tour.

LPGA Tour playoff record (5–3)

No.	Year	Tournament	Opponent(s)	Result
1	2014	CME Group Tour Championship	(Spain) Carlota Ciganda (Paraguay) Julieta Granada	Won with par on fourth extra hole Granada eliminated by par on second hole
2	2015	Swinging Skirts LPGA Classic	(United States) Morgan Pressel	Won with birdie on second extra hole
3	2015	Canadian Pacific Women's Open	(United States) Stacy Lewis	Won with par on first extra hole
4	2016	KPMG Women's PGA Championship	(Canada) Brooke Henderson	Lost to birdie on first extra hole
5	2016	Marathon Classic	(Thailand) Ariya Jutanugarn (South Korea) Mirim Lee	Won with birdie on fourth extra hole
6	2018	LPGA Mediheal Championship	(Australia) Minjee Lee	Won with eagle on first extra hole
7	2021	Pelican Women's Championship	(United States) Lexi Thompson (United States) Nelly Korda (South Korea) Kim Sei-young	Korda won with birdie on first extra hole
8	2024	LPGA Drive On Championship	(United States) Nelly Korda	Korda won with par on second extra hole

=== Ladies European Tour wins (8) ===
No.	Date	Tournament	Winning score	To par	Margin of victory	Runner(s)-up
1	10 Feb 2013	ISPS Handa New Zealand Women's Open^{[4]}^{[6]}	70-68-68=206	−10	1 stroke	(United States) Amelia Lewis
2	22 Feb 2015	ISPS Handa Women's Australian Open^{[5]}^{[6]}	70-70-72-71=283	−9	2 strokes	(South Korea) Amy Yang
3	1 Mar 2015	ISPS Handa New Zealand Women's Open^{[6]} (2)	70-61-71=202	−14	4 strokes	(Australia) Hannah Green (a)
4	13 Sep 2015	The Evian Championship^{[5]}	69-69-67-63=268	−16	6 strokes	(United States) Lexi Thompson
5	14 Feb 2016	ISPS Handa New Zealand Women's Open^{[6]} (3)	69-67-70=206	−10	2 strokes	(South Korea) Choi Hye-jin (a) (England) Felicity Johnson (Denmark) Nanna Koerstz Madsen
6	7 Nov 2021	Aramco Saudi Ladies International	67-70-63-65=265	−23	5 strokes	(Thailand) Atthaya Thitikul
7	19 Feb 2023	Aramco Saudi Ladies International (2)	64-69-66-68=267	−21	1 stroke	(India) Aditi Ashok
8	25 Aug 2024	AIG Women's Open^{[5]}	71-70-71-69=281	−7	2 strokes	(United States) Nelly Korda (South Korea) Jiyai Shin (United States) Lilia Vu (China) Yin Ruoning

^{4} Ko won the 2013 ISPS Handa New Zealand Women's Open as an amateur.
^{5} Co-sanctioned by the LPGA Tour.
^{6} Co-sanctioned by the ALPG Tour.

=== ALPG Tour wins (5) ===
No.	Date	Tournament	Winning score	To par	Margin of victory	Runner(s)-up
1	29 Jan 2012	Bing Lee Samsung Women's NSW Open^{[7]}	69-64-69=202	−14	4 strokes	(Wales) Becky Morgan
2	10 Feb 2013	ISPS Handa New Zealand Women's Open^{[7]}^{[9]}	70-68-68=206	−10	1 stroke	(United States) Amelia Lewis
3	22 Feb 2015	ISPS Handa Women's Australian Open^{[8]}^{[9]}	70-70-72-71=283	−9	2 strokes	(South Korea) Amy Yang
4	1 Mar 2015	ISPS Handa New Zealand Women's Open^{[9]} (2)	70-61-71=202	−14	4 strokes	(Australia) Hannah Green (a)
5	14 Feb 2016	ISPS Handa New Zealand Women's Open^{[9]} (3)	69-67-70=206	−10	2 strokes	(South Korea) Choi Hye-jin (a) (England) Felicity Johnson (Denmark) Nanna Koerstz Madsen

^{7} Ko won the Bing Lee Samsung Women's NSW Open and the 2013 ISPS Handa New Zealand Women's Open as an amateur.
^{8} Co-sanctioned by the LPGA Tour.
^{9} Co-sanctioned by the Ladies European Tour.

=== KLPGA Tour wins (1) ===
No.	Date	Tournament	Winning score	To par	Margin of victory	Runner-up
1	8 Dec 2013	Swinging Skirts World Ladies Masters	68-68-69=205	−11	3 strokes	(South Korea) Ryu So-yeon

=== Other wins (1) ===
No.	Date	Tournament	Winning score	To par	Margin of victory	Runners-up
1	10 Dec 2023	Grant Thornton Invitational (with (Australia) Jason Day)	58-66-66=190	−26	1 stroke	(Canada) Corey Conners and (Canada) Brooke Henderson

== Major championships ==
=== Wins (3) ===
Year	Championship	54 holes	Winning score	Margin	Runner(s)-up
2015	The Evian Championship	2 shot deficit	−16 (69-69-67-63=268)	6 strokes	(United States) Lexi Thompson
2016	ANA Inspiration	1 shot deficit	−12 (70-68-69-69=276)	1 stroke	(England) Charley Hull, (South Korea) Chun In-gee
2024	AIG Women's British Open	3 shot deficit	−7 (71-70-71-69=281)	2 strokes	(United States) Nelly Korda, (South Korea) Jiyai Shin, (United States) Lilia Vu, (China) Yin Ruoning

=== Results timeline ===
Results not in chronological order.

Tournament	2012	2013	2014	2015	2016	2017	2018	2019	2020	2021	2022	2023	2024	2025	2026
Chevron Championship		T25LA	T29	T51	1	T11	T20	T44	6	2	T25	CUT	T17	T52	CUT
U.S. Women's Open	T39LA	T36	T15	T12	T3	T33	T49	T39	T13	T35	5	T33	CUT	T26	CUT
Women's PGA Championship		T17LA	3	CUT	2	T59	T31	T10	T18	T52	T46	T57	T46	T12	T15
The Evian Championship ^		2LA	T8	1	T43	T3	T10	CUT	NT	T6	T3	T61	T39	CUT	T7
Women's British Open	T17LA	T42TLA	T29	T3	T40	T59	T11	CUT	T14	T29	T7	CUT	1	T36	T20

^ The Evian Championship was added as a major in 2013.

Win
Top 10
Did not play

LA = low amateur
CUT = missed the half-way cut
NT = no tournament
T = tied

=== Summary ===
Tournament	Wins	2nd	3rd	Top-5	Top-10	Top-25	Events	Cuts made
Chevron Championship	1	1	0	2	3	8	14	12
U.S. Women's Open	0	0	1	2	2	5	15	13
Women's PGA Championship	0	1	1	2	3	7	14	13
The Evian Championship	1	1	2	4	8	8	13	11
Women's British Open	1	0	1	2	3	7	15	13
Totals	3	3	5	12	19	35	71	62

- Most consecutive cuts made – 21 (2015 U.S. Open – 2019 PGA)
- Longest streak of top-10s – 5 (2015 British – 2016 U.S. Women's Open)
- Longest streak of top-3s – 5 (2015 British – 2016 U.S. Women's Open)

== Summer Olympics ==
=== Singles: 3 (1 gold, 1 silver, 1 bronze medal) ===
No.	Date	Tournament	Score	To par	Gold medalist	Silver medalist	Bronze medalist
1	20 Aug 2016	Rio Olympics	69-70-65-69=273	−11	(South Korea) Inbee Park	(New Zealand) Lydia Ko	(China) Shanshan Feng
2	7 Aug 2021	Tokyo Olympics	70-67-66-65=268	−16	(United States) Nelly Korda	(Japan) Mone Inami	(New Zealand) Lydia Ko
3	10 Aug 2024	Paris Olympics	72-67-68-71=278	−10	(New Zealand) Lydia Ko	(West Germany) Esther Henseleit	(China) Lin Xiyu

== LPGA Tour career summary ==
Year	Starts	Cuts made^{a}	Wins	2nd	3rd	Top-10	Best finish	Earnings ($)	Money list rank	Scoring average	Scoring rank
2012	4	4	1	0	0	1	1	n/a	n/a	72.94	n/a
2013	12	12	1	1	1	6	1	0	n/a	70.41	n/a
2014	26	26	3	2	3	15	1	2,089,033	3	70.08	5
2015	24	23	5	3	3	17	1	2,800,802	1	69.44	2
2016	24	24	4	3	2	14	1	2,493,059	2	69.60	2
2017	26	22	0	3	1	11	2	1,177,450	13	69.86	9
2018	26	24	1	1	1	10	1	1,118,180	12	70.05	7
2019	24	21	0	0	0	4	T6	444,256	48	70.98	39
2020	13	12	0	1	0	5	T2	677,545	9	70.26	6
2021	20	19	1	4	1	11	1	1,530,629	5	69.33	3
2022	22	22	3	0	4	14	1	4,364,403	1	68.99	1
2023	20	16	0	0	1	2	4	247,335	90	71.25	61
2024	20	18	3	1	1	8	1	3,201,289	3	70.25	7
2025	16	14	1	0	0	5	1	1,172,787	34	70.41	23
2026	14	11				5	4	1,027,933	22	70.36	6
Totals^ (as member, 2014)	275	253	23	18	17	121	1	22,344,701	2	–	–
Totals (as non-member, 2012–13)	16	16	2	1	1	7	1	–	–	–	–

^ Official as of 2 August 2026
^{a} Includes matchplay and other events without a cut
Notes: 1) Ko turned professional on 23 October 2013, but was not a member of the LPGA Tour. Money earned in 2013 was not considered official by the LPGA Tour. 2) She made the cut in her first 53 LPGA Tour events, with the first 16 being as an amateur. After missing the cut at the 2015 KPMG Women's PGA Championship held 11–14 June, Ko made the next 40 consecutive tour event cuts until she missed her second LPGA cut at the 2017 Kia Classic held 23–26 March.

== World ranking ==
Position in Women's World Golf Rankings at the end of each calendar year.

Year	World ranking	Source
2010	549	
2011	295	
2012	43	
2013	4	
2014	2	
2015	1	
2016	1	
2017	9	
2018	14	
2019	40	
2020	29	
2021	3	
2022	1	
2023	11	
2024	3	
2025	6	
2026	11^	

^ As of 13 July 2026

- On 2 February 2015, Ko first ascended to the world No. 1 ranking.
- On 12 June 2017, her streak of 85 consecutive weeks (4th longest all-time) with the No. 1-ranking came to an end when Ariya Jutanugarn won the 2017 Manulife LPGA Classic to move up one spot.
- On 28 November 2022, Ko reascended to the top of the world rankings for the first time since 11 June 2017, the longest time span between #1 rankings, 5 years, 5 months, and 17 days. During this span of time, the LPGA Tour saw 7 more women hold the #1-ranking. The second longest was Inbee Park, 2 years, 4 months, and 29 days.
- Since 2 February 2015, when she first became the world No. 1 golfer, she has held the top ranking for 125 total weeks which ranks her 3rd highest, only behind Ko Jin-young's 163 weeks, and Lorena Ochoa's 158 weeks.
- On 18 July 2016, Ko hit her highest point average of 15.47.
- On 18 July 2016, Ko established her biggest point lead over the No. 2-ranked player. Her 15.47 average was 7.10 points above No. 2-ranked Brooke Henderson's 8.37 average.

== Team appearances ==
Amateur

- Espirito Santo Trophy (representing New Zealand): 2010, 2012
- Astor Trophy (representing New Zealand): 2011
- Queen Sirikit Cup (representing New Zealand): 2010, 2011, 2012

Professional

- International Crown (representing World Team): 2025

== Records and achievements ==
- On 29 January 2012, became the youngest person to ever win a professional golf tour event (New South Wales Women's Open) at age 14 years, 9 months and 5 days.
- On 26 August 2012, became the youngest winner of an LPGA Tour event (Canadian Women's Open) at age 15 years, 4 months and 2 days
- On 10 February 2013, became the youngest winner of a Ladies European Tour event (ISPS Handa NZ Women's Open) at age 15 years, 9 months and 17 days.
- On 25 August 2013, became the youngest and only amateur to win two LPGA Tour events – age 15 and 16 (2012 and 2013 Canadian Women's Open)
- On 12 November 2014, became the youngest winner of the LPGA Rookie of the Year in LPGA history at age 17 years, 6 months and 19 days surpassing Laura Baugh who won her title at 18 years, 6 months and 29 days and held the "youngest" label for 41 years.
- On 23 November 2014, became the youngest player to win 5 events on a major tour at age 17 years, 6 months and 30 days.
- On 23 November 2014, became the youngest and first player to win the biggest payout in LPGA history, taking home US$1.5 million after capturing the tour's season-ending event and winning the inaugural Race to the CME Globe at age 17 years, 6 months and 30 days.
- On 23 November 2014, became the youngest rookie player to set an LPGA record for most money earned by a rookie at $2,089,033 at age 17 years, 6 months and 30 days – breaking Julieta Granada's 2006 mark of $1,633,586.
- On 2 February 2015, became the youngest player of either gender to ever be ranked No. 1 in professional golf by both the Official World Golf Ranking and the Rolex World Golf Ranking at age 17 years, 9 months and 9 days, eclipsing Tiger Woods who was 21 years, 5 months and 15 days when he became men's world number one in 1997 and Jiyai Shin who was 22 years and 5 days when she became women's world number one in 2010.
- On 22 February 2015, became the youngest winner of the ISPS Handa Women's Australian Open title at age 17 years, 9 months and 29 days.
- On 2 April 2015, tied Annika Sörenstam for the most consecutive rounds under-par in LPGA Tour events, at 29.
- On 15 July 2015, became the youngest winner of Best Female Golfer ESPY Award at age 18 years, 2 months and 21 days.
- On 13 September 2015, became the youngest player in the "modern era" (post-1900) of either gender to win a major championship at The Evian Championship at age 18 years, 4 months and 20 days surpassing Johnny McDermott who was 19 years, 9 months and 14 days when he won his PGA major in 1911 and Morgan Pressel who was 18 years, 10 months and 9 days when she won her LPGA major in 2007.
- On 13 September 2015, her closing round of 63 in the Evian was the record lowest final round in the history of women's golf majors.
- On 26 October 2015, became the youngest player to win 10 events on a major tour at age 18 years, 6 months and 2 days surpassing Horton Smith who set the PGA Tour mark of 21 years, 7 months in 1929, and Nancy Lopez who set the previous LPGA Tour record in 1979 at 22 years, 2 months, 5 days.
- On 22 November 2015, became the youngest winner of the LPGA Top Ten Finishes with 17 top ten finishes in 24 events (71%), at age 18 years, 6 months and 29 days.
- On 22 November 2015, became the youngest winner of the LPGA Official Money List at age 18 years, 6 months and 29 days.
- On 22 November 2015, became the youngest winner of the LPGA Player of the Year in the 49 years history of the award at age 18 years, 6 months and 29 days, surpassing Nancy Lopez who won her title at age 21 years, 10 months and 6 days and held the "youngest" title for 37 years.
- On 22 November 2015, became the youngest MVP/Player of the Year ever across all four major sports and the LPGA/PGA Tour: LPGA - Lydia Ko (18); PGA - Tiger Woods (21); NHL - Wayne Gretzky (19); NFL - Jim Brown (21); NBA - Derrick Rose(22); MLB - Stan Musial, Johnny Bench, Vida Blue (22)
- On 28 December 2015, became the youngest year-end #1 in Rolex Rankings history at age 18 years, 8 months and 4 days.
- On 3 April 2016, became the youngest player in the "modern era" (post-1900) of either gender to win 2 major championships at the ANA Inspiration at age 18 years, 11 months and 10 days, surpassing Gene Sarazen who was 20 years, 5 months and 22 days when he won his second PGA major in 1922 and Se Ri Pak who was 20 years, 9 months and 8 days when she won her second LPGA major in 1998.
- On 3 April 2016, became the first New Zealander to win 2 majors. The other New Zealanders who have won a major, Sir Bob Charles and Michael Campbell, have each won one.
- On 11 July 2016, Ko finished T3 at the U.S. Open. This marked her 5th consecutive top-3 finish in a major. She finished T3, 1, 1, 2, T3 at the 2015 British Open, 2015 Evian Champ., 2016 ANA Inspiration, 2016 Women's PGA Champ., and 2016 U.S. Open, respectively.
- On 17 July 2016, Ko won the Marathon Classic for her fourth Tour title of the year. It marked her second consecutive year winning at least four Tour titles (she won five Tour titles in 2015). It's also her second consecutive season winning at least US$2.25M and her third consecutive season winning at least US$2.00M.
- On 20 August 2016, became the youngest Olympic medal winner (silver) in women's golf in Rio. She also became New Zealand's youngest individual female medallist at the Olympics.
- In 2016, Ko became only the 3rd woman, after Lorena Ochoa and Yani Tseng, to hold the world No. 1 ranking for all 52 weeks of the year.

=== Career money records ===
- On 20 July 2014, became the youngest millionaire ever on the LPGA in her first full season as a pro when she won the Marathon Classic taking her accumulated prize earnings to over US$1 million at age 17 years, 2 months and 26 days. Ko reached the US$1 million mark in 16 events (5 months 25 days) second fastest behind the record holder Paula Creamer who achieved the US$1 million mark in 16 events (4 months 27 days).
- On 23 November 2014, became the youngest and fastest player to surpass US$2 million in career earnings at age 17 years, 6 months and 30 days The previous record holder, Yani Tseng, accomplished this feat in 32 events. Ko reached the US$2 million mark in just 26 events – the most ever made by a rookie; over US$3 million if include bonus prize of US$1 million for winning the Race to the CME Globe 2014 (CME Globe bonus prize does not count on player's LPGA official earnings)
- On 3 May 2015, became the youngest and fastest player to surpass US$3 million in career earnings at age 18 years and 9 days. The previous record holder, Yani Tseng, accomplished this feat in 53 events. Ko reached the US$3 million mark in just 35 events.
- On 13 September 2015, became the youngest and fastest player to surpass US$4 million career earnings at age 18 years, 4 months and 20 days after winning her first major at the Evian Championship. The previous record holder, Yani Tseng, accomplished this feat in 65 events. Ko reached the US$4 million mark in just 45 events.
- On 21 February 2016, became the youngest and fastest player to surpass US$5 million career earnings at age 18 years, 9 months and 28 days after finishing second in the Women's Australian Open. The previous record holder, Yani Tseng, accomplished this feat in 76 events. Ko reached the US$5 million mark in just 52 events.
- On 12 June 2016, became the youngest and fastest player to surpass US$6 million career earnings at age 19 years, 1 month and 19 days after finishing second in the KPMG Women's PGA Championship. The previous record holder, Yani Tseng, accomplished this feat in 84 events. Ko reached the US$6 million mark in just 61 events.
- On 17 July 2016, became the youngest and fastest player to surpass US$7 million career earnings at age 19 years, 2 months and 23 days after winning the Marathon Classic, her 4th Tour title of the year. The previous record holder, Yani Tseng, accomplished this feat in 90 events. Ko reached the US$7 million mark in just 65 events.
- On 10 September 2017, became the youngest and fastest player to surpass US$8 million career earnings at age 20 years, 4 months and 17 days after finishing 2nd at the Indy Women in Tech Championship. The previous record holder, Yani Tseng, accomplished this feat in 98 events. Ko reached the US$8 million mark in 93 events.
- On 20 November 2022, won $2 million at the CME Group Tour Championship, moving her up to 5th on the LPGA Tour career money list with $16,695,357.

== Honours and awards ==
- Mark H. McCormack Medal – 2011, 2012, 2013
- Halberg Supreme Award – 2013, 2024
- New Zealand Sportswoman of the Year – 2013, 2014, 2015, 2024
- LPGA Rookie of the Year – 2014
- LPGA Player of the Year – 2015, 2022
- LPGA Tour Money Winner – 2015, 2022
- LPGA Vare Trophy – 2021, 2022
- Rolex Annika Major Award - 2016
- Member of the New Zealand Order of Merit − 2016
- William and Mousie Powell Award - 2021
- Best Female Golfer ESPY Award – 2015, 2016
- Race to the CME Globe – 2014, 2015, 2022
- GWAA Female Player of the Year – 2015, 2022
- LPGA Hall of Fame - 2024
- Dame Companion of the New Zealand Order of Merit − 2025

== See also ==
- List of golfers with most LPGA major championship wins
- List of golfers with most LPGA Tour wins

Awards
Preceded by Valerie Adams	Lonsdale Cup; 2015; 2024	Succeeded by Lisa Carrington
Preceded by Lisa Carrington	Lonsdale Cup; 2015; 2024	Succeeded by Hamish Kerr
Preceded by Valerie Adams	New Zealand's Sportswoman of the Year; 2013, 2014, 2015; 2024	Succeeded by Lisa Carrington
Preceded by Lisa Carrington	New Zealand's Sportswoman of the Year; 2013, 2014, 2015; 2024	Succeeded by Zoi Sadowski-Synnott
Preceded by Hamish Bond and Eric Murray	Halberg Awards – Supreme Award; 2013; 2024	Succeeded by Hamish Bond and Eric Murray
Preceded by Lisa Carrington	Halberg Awards – Supreme Award; 2013; 2024	Succeeded by Hamish Kerr
Preceded by Jacko Gill	Halberg Awards – Emerging Talent Award; 2012	Succeeded by Gabrielle Fa'amausili
