= 2016 U.S. Women's Open =

Coordinates: 37.068°N 121.633°W

Tournament information
- Dates: July 7–10, 2016
- Location: San Martin, California
- Course: CordeValle Golf Club
- Organized by: USGA
- Tour: LPGA Tour

Statistics
- Par: 72
- Length: 6,784 yards (6,203 m)
- Field: 156 players, 72 after cut
- Cut: 148 (+4)
- Prize fund: $4.5 million
- Winner's share: $810,000

Champion
- (United States) Brittany Lang
- 282 (−6), playoff

Location in the United States
Location in California

The 2016 U.S. Women's Open was the 71st U.S. Women's Open, held July 7–10 at CordeValle Golf Club in San Martin, California, southeast of San Jose.

The U.S. Women's Open is the oldest of the five current major championships and the third of the 2016 season. It has the largest purse in women's golf at $4.5 million, and was televised by Fox Sports 1 and Fox Sports.

Brittany Lang won her first major title in a playoff over Anna Nordqvist.

== Qualifying and field ==
The championship was open to any female professional or amateur golfer with a USGA handicap index not exceeding 2.4. Players qualified by competing in one of twenty 36-hole qualifying tournaments held at sites across the United States and at international sites in China, England, Japan, and South Korea. Additional players were exempt from qualifying because of past performances in professional or amateur tournaments around the world. The USGA received a record 1,855 entries for the championship.

=== Exempt from qualifying ===
Many players are exempt in multiple categories. Players are listed only once, in the first category in which they became exempt, with additional categories in parentheses ( ) next to their names. Golfers qualifying in Category 13 who qualified in other categories are denoted with the tour by which they qualified.

1. Winners of the U.S. Women's Open for the last ten years (2006–2015)

Choi Na-yeon (10,15,16), Chun In-gee (9,11,13-KLPGA,15,16), Paula Creamer (10,15), Ji Eun-hee (10,15,16), Cristie Kerr (10,12,15,16), Ryu So-yeon (9,10,15,16), Michelle Wie (10)

- Inbee Park (5,6,7,9,10,12,15,16) – thumb injury and Annika Sörenstam did not enter the tournament

2. Winner and runner-up from the 2015 U.S. Women's Amateur (must be an amateur)

Hannah O'Sullivan (a), Sierra Brooks (a)

3. Winner of the 2016 British Ladies Amateur Golf Championship (must be an amateur)

Julia Engström (a)

4. Winner of the 2015 Mark H. McCormack Medal (Women's World Amateur Golf Ranking) (must be an amateur)

Leona Maguire (a)

5. Winners of the Women's PGA Championship for the last five years (2012–2016)

Shanshan Feng (13-LET,14,15,16), Brooke Henderson (9,11,12,15,16)

6. Winners of the Women's British Open for the last five years (2011–2015)

Stacy Lewis (9,10,15,16), Mo Martin (16), Yani Tseng

- Jiyai Shin (13-JLPGA,15,16) did not enter the tournament

7. Winners of the ANA Inspiration for the last five years (2012–2016)

Lydia Ko (8,10,11,12,15,16), Brittany Lincicome (15,16), Lexi Thompson (11,12,15,16), Yoo Sun-young (10)

8. Winners of the Evian Championship (2013–2015)

Kim Hyo-joo (12, 13-KLPGA,15,16), Suzann Pettersen (10,15,16)

9. Ten lowest scorers and anyone tying for 10th place from the 2015 U.S. Women's Open

Pernilla Lindberg (10), Shiho Oyama (15,16), Jane Park (10), Morgan Pressel (10,15,16) Amy Yang (10,15,16)

10. Top 75 money leaders from the 2015 final official LPGA money list

Marina Alex, Baek Kyu-jung, Chella Choi (12,15,16), Carlota Ciganda (15,16), Austin Ernst, Sandra Gal, Julieta Granada, Jaye Marie Green, Wei Ling Hsu, Charley Hull (15,16), M. J. Hur, Karine Icher, Jang Ha-na (11,12,15,16), Ariya Jutanugarn (12,15,16), Moriya Jutanugarn, Danielle Kang, Kim Kaufman, Christina Kim, In-Kyung Kim, Kim Sei-young (11,15,16), Jessica Korda (12,15,16), Candie Kung (15,16), Brittany Lang (15,16), Alison Lee (15,16), Ilhee Lee (15), Lee Mi-hyang (15), Min Lee, Minjee Lee (11,12,15,16), Mirim Lee (15,16), Caroline Masson, Catriona Matthew, Maria McBride, Sydnee Michaels, Mika Miyazato (15,16), Azahara Muñoz (15,16), Haru Nomura (11,12,15,16), Anna Nordqvist (15,16), Ryann O'Toole, Lee-Anne Pace (15,16), Park Hee-young (16), Pornanong Phatlum (15,16), Gerina Piller (11,15,16), Beatriz Recari, Lizette Salas (15), Alena Sharp, Jenny Shin (11,12,15,16), Kelly Shon, Jennifer Song, Angela Stanford, Kris Tamulis (12), Mariajo Uribe, Karrie Webb (15), Sakura Yokomine

11. Top 10 money leaders from the 2016 official LPGA money list, through the close of entries on May 4

12. Winners of LPGA co-sponsored events, whose victories are considered official, from the conclusion of the 2015 U.S. Women's Open to the initiation of the 2016 U.S. Women's Open

13. Top five money leaders from the 2015 Japan LPGA Tour, Korea LPGA Tour and Ladies European Tour

- Japan LPGA Tour: Ahn Sun-ju (15,16), Lee Bo-mee (15,16), Teresa Lu (15,16)
- Korea LPGA Tour: Cho Yoon-ji, Lee Jung-min (15, 16), Park Sung-hyun (15,16)
- Ladies European Tour: Melissa Reid, Nicole Broch Larsen, Gwladys Nocera, Beth Allen
- Jang Su-yeon (KLPGA,16), Ko Jin-young (KLPGA,15,16), Lee Ji-hee (JLPGA,15), did not play

14. Top three money leaders from the 2015 China LPGA Tour

Ssu-Chia Cheng, Xi Yu Lin

- Pan Yan-hong did not play

15. Top 50 point leaders from the current Rolex Rankings and anyone tying for 50th place as of May 4

16. Top 50 point leaders from the current Rolex Rankings and anyone tying for 50th place as of July 3

Su-Hyun Oh, Ayaka Watanabe

- Kim Ha-neul did not play

17. Special exemptions selected by the USGA

Se Ri Pak

=== Qualifiers ===
Additional players qualified through sectional qualifying tournaments taking place in May and June at sites in the United States, China, South Korea, England, and Japan.

May 9 at The Home Course, DuPont, Washington

Naomi Eun Young Ko (a)

May 16 at Cheonan, South Korea

Ryu Hae-ran (a)
Choi Hye-jin (a)

May 16 at Bradenton Country Club, Bradenton, Florida

Nelly Korda
Jodi Ewart Shadoff

May 16 at Butler Country Club, Butler, Pennsylvania

Bailey Tardy (a)
Nannette Hill

May 16 at Pebble Creek Golf Club, Becker, Minnesota

Jing Yan

May 16 at Shady Oaks Country Club, Fort Worth, Texas

Su-Hyun Oh (later qualified in category 16)
Hannah Wood (a)

May 16 at Terravita Golf & Country Club, Scottsdale, Arizona

Marissa Chow (a)
Spencer Heller

May 16 at The Heritage Golf Course at Westmoor, Westminster, Colorado

Jennifer Kupcho (a)
Yu Sang Hou (a)

May 16 at Waialae Country Club, Honolulu, Hawaii

Allisen Corpuz (a)

May 17 at TPC at The Woodlands (Player Course), The Woodlands, Texas

Gaby López
Liv Cheng

May 23 at Quail Ridge Country Club (South Course), Boynton Beach, Florida

Sandra Angulo Minarro
Mika Liu (a)

May 23 at Dunwoody Country Club, Dunwoody, Georgia

Madelene Sagström
Jackie Stoelting

May 23 at Hermitage Country Club, Manakin-Sabot, Virginia

Maude-Aimee Leblanc
Lee Lopez
Christine Song

May 23 at Oak Park Country Club, River Grove, Illinois

Erica Shepherd (a)
Ashleigh Simon

May 24 at Westwood Country Club, St. Louis, Missouri

Kasey Petty
Anna Hack (a)

May 24 at Canoe Brook Country Club (North Course), Summit, New Jersey

Pei-Yun Chien
Sophia Popov

May 25 at Buckinghamshire, England

Jade Schaeffer
Olivia Cowan
Valentine Derrey
Camilla Lennarth
Pamela Pretswell

May 25 at Carolina Trace Country Club (Lake Course), Sanford, North Carolina

Paula Hurtado
Lauren Stephenson (a)

May 26 at Shanghai, China

Liu Yan (a)

May 30 at Ibaraki Prefecture, Japan

Erina Hara
Emi Sato
Ayaka Matsumori
Chika Sawada (a)

May 31 at Twin Hills Country Club, Longmeadow, Massachusetts

Megan Khang
Sue Kim
Miriam Nagl
Kelly Tan
Albane Valenzuela (a)

May 31 at Industry Hills Golf Club (Eisenhower Course), City Of Industry, California

Alexandra Kaui (a)
Angel Yin

May 31 at Green Valley Country Club, Fairfield, California

Taylor Kim
Julie Yang

June 2 at Goose Creek Golf Club, Mira Loma, California

Robynn Ree (a)
Karah Sanford (a)

June 3 at Sugar Mill Country Club, New Smyrna Beach, Florida

Rinko Mitsunaga (a)
Sandra Changkija

=== Alternates added to field ===
The following players were added to the field before the start of the tournament when spots reserved for exemptions in various categories were not used, and to replace players who withdrew from the tournament.

- Amy Anderson, Hannah Burke, Chih-Min Chen (a), Cydney Clanton, Kotone Hori, Caroline Inglis, Yunjie Zhang (a)

== Course layout ==
Round	Hole	1	2	3	4	5	6	7	8	9	Out	10	11	12	13	14	15	16	17	18	In	Total
	Par	4	4	5	3	4	4	4	3	5	36	4	4	3	4	4	5	3	4	5	36	72
1	Yards	396	426	523	210	352	371	410	183	561	3,432	407	360	191	382	429	471	166	418	528	3,352	6,784
2	Yards	402	423	525	179	347	374	401	155	553	3,359	408	349	183	375	435	471	168	409	537	3,355	6,694
3	Yards	381	428	518	160	349	372	405	164	549	3,326	407	363	202	389	438	483	177	413	517	3,389	6,715
4	Yards	400	421	494	214	360	381	416	147	572	3,405	399	358	183	384	435	485	120	426	523	3,313	6,718

- Scoring average: 74.49
  - by round: 74.37, 75.22, 72.69, 73.93
- Most difficult holes in relation to par: 14, 2, 9, 1, 8

== Round summaries ==
=== First round ===
Thursday, July 7, 2016

Place	Player	Score	To par
1	(South Korea) Mirim Lee	64	−8
T2	(United States) Cristie Kerr	67	−5
T2	(Australia) Minjee Lee	67	−5
T2	(South Korea) Amy Yang	67	−5
T5	(United States) Brittany Lang	68	−4
T5	(Sweden) Anna Nordqvist	68	−4
T5	(Malaysia) Kelly Tan	68	−4
T8	(South Korea) Ji Eun-hee	69	−3
T8	(Thailand) Moriya Jutanugarn	69	−3
T8	(United States) Sydnee Michaels	69	−3

=== Second round ===
Friday, July 8, 2016

Place	Player	Score	To par
1	(South Korea) Park Sung-hyun	70-66=136	−8
T2	(South Korea) Mirim Lee	64-74=138	−6
T2	(South Korea) Amy Yang	67-71=138	−6
T4	(New Zealand) Lydia Ko	73-66=139	−5
T4	(Japan) Haru Nomura	70-69=139	−5
T6	(South Korea) Ji Eun-hee	69-71=140	−4
T6	(United States) Danielle Kang	71-69=140	−4
T6	(United States) Jessica Korda	70-70=140	−4
T6	(Malaysia) Kelly Tan	68-72=140	−4
10	(Canada) Maude-Aimee Leblanc	72-69=141	−3
10	(United States) Mo Martin	71-70=141	−3
10	(United States) Sydnee Michaels	69-72=141	−3
10	(England) Jodi Ewart Shadoff	70-71=141	−3
10	(United States) Angela Stanford	71-70=141	−3

=== Third round ===
Saturday, July 9, 2016

Place	Player	Score	To par
1	(New Zealand) Lydia Ko	73-66-70=209	−7
T2	(South Korea) Ji Eun-hee	69-71-70=210	−6
T2	(South Korea) Park Sung-hyun	70-66-74=210	−6
T4	(United States) Brittany Lang	68-75-68=211	−5
T4	(South Korea) Amy Yang	67-71-73=211	−5
6	(United States) Angela Stanford	71-70-71=212	−4
7	(United States) Danielle Kang	71-69-73=213	−3
T8	(Thailand) Ariya Jutanugarn	70-75-69=214	−2
T8	(United States) Cristie Kerr	67-75-72=214	−2
T8	(South Korea) Mirim Lee	64-74-76=214	−2
T8	(United States) Stacy Lewis	71-74-69=214	−2
T8	(Mexico) Gaby López	71-72-71=214	−2
T8	(Japan) Haru Nomura	70-69-75=214	−2
T8	(United States) Kris Tamulis	71-72-71=214	−2

=== Final round ===
Sunday, July 10, 2016

Place	Player	Score	To par	Money ($)
T1	(United States) Brittany Lang	68-75-68-71=282	−6	Playoff
T1	(Sweden) Anna Nordqvist	68-74-73-67=282	−6	Playoff
T3	(South Korea) Ji Eun-hee	69-71-70-74=284	−4	213,638
T3	(New Zealand) Lydia Ko	73-66-70-75=284	−4	213,638
T3	(South Korea) Park Sung-hyun	70-66-74-74=284	−4	213,638
T3	(South Korea) Amy Yang	67-71-73-73=284	−4	213,638
7	(United States) Stacy Lewis	71-74-69-71=285	−3	140,590
T8	(United States) Cristie Kerr	67-75-72-72=286	−2	115,705
T8	(United States) Gerina Piller	70-72-74-70=286	−2	115,705
T8	(England) Jodi Ewart Shadoff	70-71-75-70=286	−2	115,705

==== Scorecard ====
Final round

Hole	1	2	3	4	5	6	7	8	9	10	11	12	13	14	15	16	17	18
Par	4	4	5	3	4	4	4	3	5	4	4	3	4	4	5	3	4	5
(United States) Lang	−6	−5	−5	−5	−6	−6	−6	−5	−5	−5	−5	−5	−6	−6	−6	−7	−6	−6
(Sweden) Nordqvist	−2	−2	−2	−2	−2	−2	−3	−3	−3	−3	−3	−4	−4	−4	−6	−6	−6	−6
(South Korea) Ji	−6	−5	−5	−4	−5	−5	−5	−5	−5	−5	−5	−4	−4	−3	−3	−3	−3	−4
(New Zealand) Ko	−7	−7	−7	−7	−7	−8	−8	−7	−5	−5	−5	−4	−4	−3	−4	−4	−4	−4
(South Korea) S. Park	−6	−5	−6	−6	−6	−6	−6	−6	−6	−6	−6	−5	−5	−4	−5	−5	−5	−4
(South Korea) Yang	−6	−5	−5	−5	−5	−5	−5	−4	−4	−4	−4	−4	−4	−4	−4	−4	−3	−4
(United States) Lewis	−2	−2	−2	−1	−1	−2	−2	−2	−1	−1	−1	−1	−1	−1	−2	−2	−3	−3
(United States) Kerr	−1	−1	−1	−1	−1	−1	−1	−1	−1	−2	−2	−1	−1	E	−1	−1	−1	−2
(United States) Piller	E	−1	−1	−1	−2	−2	−2	−3	−2	−1	−2	−2	−1	−1	−2	−2	−2	−2
(England) Shadoff	E	E	−1	−1	−1	−2	−2	−2	−2	−2	−2	−1	−1	−1	−2	−2	−2	−2
(South Korea) M. Lee	−2	−3	−3	−3	−4	−5	−5	−4	−4	−4	−3	−3	−2	−1	−1	−1	−1	−1
(United States) Stanford	−4	−4	−3	−3	−3	−3	−3	−3	−2	−2	−2	−2	−1	−1	−1	−1	−1	−1
(Thailand) Jutanugarn	−2	−2	E	E	E	E	E	−1	+1	+1	+1	+1	+1	+1	E	E	E	E
(United States) Kang	−1	E	E	E	E	E	E	E	+1	+1	+1	+1	+1	+1	E	+1	+1	E

Cumulative tournament scores, relative to par

Eagle	Birdie	Bogey	Double bogey

=== Playoff ===
The three-hole aggregate playoff was held on the final three holes, and any additional play in sudden-death was to occur on the final hole. Both players made pars on the first two holes, but it was soon determined that Nordqvist had slightly moved sand prior to her approach shot from the fairway bunker on 17, a two-stroke penalty (rule 13-4b). The players were told of the penalty by a rules official midway through the par-5 final hole, after Nordqvist's third shot but before Lang's.

Place	Player	Score	To par	Money ($)
1	(United States) Brittany Lang	3-4-5=12	E	810,000
2	(Sweden) Anna Nordqvist	3-6-6=15	+3	486,000

- Playoff held on holes 16, 17, and 18.

==== Scorecard ====
Hole	16	17	18
Par	3	4	5
(United States) Lang	E	E	E
(Sweden) Nordqvist	E	+2	+3

Cumulative playoff scores, relative to par
