= 2015 LPGA of Korea Tour =

The 2015 LPGA of Korea Tour is the 38th season of the LPGA of Korea Tour, the professional golf tour for women operated by the Korea Ladies Professional Golf' Association. It consists of 31 golf tournaments, 28 played in South Korea, two in China, and one in Japan.

== Schedule ==
The number in parentheses after winners' names show the player's total number wins in official money individual events on the LPGA of Korea Tour, including that event.

Dates	Tournament	Host city	Prize fund (KRW)	Winner
Dec 12–14	Hyundai China Ladies Open	(China) Haikou	US$550,000	(South Korea) Kim Hyo-joo (8)
Apr 9–12	Lotte Mart Women's Open	(South Korea) Seogwipo	600,000,000	(South Korea) Kim Bo-kyung (4)
Apr 17–19	Samchully Together Open	(South Korea) Ansan	700,000,000	(South Korea) Chun In-gee (5)
Apr 24–26	Nexen-Saintnine Masters	(South Korea) Gimhae	500,000,000	(South Korea) Ko Jin-young (2)
May 1–3	KG-Edaily Ladies Open	(South Korea) Muju	500,000,000	(South Korea) Kim Min-sun (2)
May 8–10	KyoChon Honey Ladies Open	(South Korea) Gyeongsan	500,000,000	(South Korea) Ko Jin-young (3)
May 15–17	NH Investment & Securities Ladies Championship	(South Korea) Yongin	500,000,000	(South Korea) Lee Jung-min (5)
May 21–24	Doosan Match Play Championship	(South Korea) Chuncheon	600,000,000	(South Korea) Chun In-gee (6)
May 29–31	E1 Charity Open	(South Korea) Icheon	600,000,000	(South Korea) Lee Jung-min (6)
Jun 5–7	Lotte Cantata Ladies Open	(South Korea) Seogwipo	600,000,000	(South Korea) Lee Jung-min (7)
Jun 12–14	S-Oil Champions Invitational	(South Korea) Jeju	600,000,000	(South Korea) Chun In-gee (7)
Jun 18–21	**Kia Motors Korea Women's Open Championship**	(South Korea) Incheon	700,000,000	(South Korea) Park Sung-hyun (1)
Jun 25–28	BC Card-Hankyung Ladies Cup	(South Korea) Ansan	700,000,000	(South Korea) Jang Ha-na (7)
Jul 3–5	Kumho Tire Ladies Open	(China) Weihai	500,000,000	(South Korea) Kim Hyo-joo (9)
Jul 10–12	ChoJung Sparkling-YongPyong Resort Open	(South Korea) Pyeongchang	500,000,000	(South Korea) Ko Jin-young (4)
Jul 16–19	BMW Ladies Championship	(South Korea) Incheon	1,200,000,000	(South Korea) Cho Yoon-ji (2)
Jul 23–26	**Hite Jinro Championship**	(South Korea) Yeoju	800,000,000	(South Korea) Chun In-gee (8)
Aug 7–9	Jeju Samdasoo Masters	(South Korea) Jeju	500,000,000	(South Korea) Lee Jeong-eun (5)
Aug 20–23	Bogner-MBN Ladies Open	(South Korea) Yangpyeong	500,000,000	(South Korea) Ha Min-song (1)
Aug 27–30	High1 Resort Ladies Open	(South Korea) Jeongseon	800,000,000	(South Korea) Ryu So-yeon (9)
Sep 3–6	Hanwha Finance Classic	(South Korea) Taean	1,200,000,000	(Japan) Harukyo Nomura (1)
Sep 10–13	**ISU Group KLPGA Championship**	(South Korea) Yeoju	700,000,000	(South Korea) Ahn Shin-ae (3)
Sep 18–20	KDB Daewoo Securities Classic	(South Korea) Chuncheon	600,000,000	(South Korea) Park Sung-hyun (2)
Sep 24–26	YTN-Volvik Women's Open	(South Korea) Yangju	500,000,000	(South Korea) Jang Ha-na (8)
Oct 2–4	OK! Savings Bank Pak Se-ri Invitational	(South Korea) Yeoju	600,000,000	(South Korea) Park Sung-hyun (3)
Oct 15–18	LPGA KEB Hana Bank Championship	(South Korea) Incheon	US$2,000,000	(United States) Lexi Thompson (1)
Oct 22–25	**KB Financial Star Championship**	(South Korea) Gwangju	700,000,000	(South Korea) Chun In-gee (9)
Oct 30 – Nov 1	Seoul Economic Daily-Munyoung Queen's Park Ladies Classic	(South Korea) Geoje	500,000,000	(South Korea) Kim Hye-youn (5)
Nov 6–8	ADT Championship	(South Korea) Busan	500,000,000	(South Korea) Oh Ji-hyun (1)
Nov 13–15	Chosun Ilbo-POSCO Championship	(South Korea) Yongin	700,000,000	(South Korea) Choi Hye-jung (1)
Dec 4–6	The Queens	(Japan) Miyoshi, Aichi	¥100,000,000	LPGA of Japan

Events in bold are majors.

LPGA KEB-HanaBank Championship is co-sanctioned with LPGA Tour.
Kumho Tire Ladies Open and Hyundai China Ladies Open are co-sanctioned with China LPGA Tour.
