= 2016 Evian Championship =

Coordinates: 46.394°N 6.570°E

Tournament information
- Dates: 15–18 September 2016
- Location: Évian-les-Bains, France
- Course(s): Evian Resort Golf Club
- Tour(s): Ladies European Tour; LPGA Tour

Statistics
- Par: 71
- Length: 6,482 yards (5,927 m)
- Field: 120 players, 72 after cut
- Cut: 145 (+3)
- Prize fund: $3,250,000 €2,890,550
- Winner's share: $487,500 €433,582

Champion
- (South Korea) Chun In-gee
- 263 (−21)

Location in France

The 2016 Evian Championship was played 15–18 September at the Evian Resort Golf Club in Évian-les-Bains, France. It was the 23rd Evian Championship (the first nineteen were played as the Evian Masters), and the fifth as a major championship on the LPGA Tour.

Chun In-gee won her first Evian and second major championship, four strokes ahead of runners-up Ryu So-yeon and Park Sung-hyun. Her 21-under-par score was a record for all women's majors.

The event was televised by Golf Channel and NBC Sports in the United States and Sky Sports in the United Kingdom.

== Field ==
The field for the tournament was set at 120, and most earned exemptions based on past performance on the Ladies European Tour (LET), the LPGA Tour, or with a high ranking in the Women's World Golf Rankings.

There were 16 exemption categories for the 2016 Evian Championship.

1. The top 40 in the Women's World Golf Rankings, as of 16 August 2016

- Choi Na-yeon (4), Chun In-gee (4), Carlota Ciganda, Shanshan Feng (4,7,8,9), Brooke Henderson (4,6), Charley Hull, Jang Ha-na (6), Ji Eun-hee (9), Ariya Jutanugarn (4,6), Cristie Kerr (6), Kim Hyo-joo (2,6), Kim Sei-young (6), Ko Jin-young, Lydia Ko (2,4,6,9), Jessica Korda (6), Candie Kung, Brittany Lang (4), Alison Lee (9), Minjee Lee (6), Mirim Lee, Stacy Lewis (4), Brittany Lincicome (4), Mo Martin (4), Haru Nomura (6), Anna Nordqvist (6), Lee-Anne Pace (9), Park Sung-hyun, Suzann Pettersen (2), Pornanong Phatlum, Gerina Piller, Morgan Pressel, Ryu So-yeon, Jenny Shin (6), Lexi Thompson (4,6,9), Amy Yang (9)
- Ahn Sun-ju (6), Lee Bo-mee, Teresa Lu, Inbee Park (3,4,5,6,9) – thumb injury, and Jiyai Shin (4,7) did not play

2. Past Evian Championship winners

- All already qualified

3. Active Evian Masters Champions (must have played in 10 LPGA Tour or LET events from 6 September 2015 to 6 September 2016)

- Paula Creamer, Laura Davies, Juli Inkster, Ai Miyazato, Karrie Webb

4. Winners of the other women's majors for the last five years

- Michelle Wie, Yoo Sun-young

5. Gold medal winner at the 2016 Summer Olympics

- Already qualified

6. LPGA Tour winners since the 2015 Evian

- Caroline Masson

7. LET winners since the 2015 Evian

- Isabelle Boineau (8), Céline Herbin, Nuria Iturrioz, In-Kyung Kim, Lee Jung-min, Lin Xiyu, Nanna Koerstz Madsen (8,14), Emily Kristine Pedersen
- Yeom Hye-in did not play

8. The top five on the LET Order of Merit, as of 6 September

- Beth Allen, Catriona Matthew

9. Top 10 and ties from the 2015 Evian Championship

- Lee Mi-hyang, Ilhee Lee

10. 2016 U.S. Women's Amateur champion

- Seong Eun-jeong (a)

11. 2016 British Ladies Amateur champion

- Julia Engström (a)

12. Top two players from the FireKeepers Casino Hotel Championship on the Symetra Tour

- Laura Gonzalez Escallon, Ally McDonald

13. Top player after the 5 Activia Dream Tour tournaments in South Korea

- Ji Joo-hyun

14. Top two from Evian qualifier

- Maria Verchenova

15. Evian invitations (three)

- Bronte Law (a), Hannah O'Sullivan (a), Albane Valenzuela (a)

16. LPGA Tour money list, as of 6 September (if needed to fill the field to 120)

- Marina Alex, Brittany Altomare, Baek Kyu-jung, Katie Burnett, Chella Choi, Cydney Clanton, Jacqui Concolino, Lindy Duncan, Austin Ernst, Jodi Ewart Shadoff, Simin Feng, Sandra Gal, Caroline Hedwall, M. J. Hur, Vicky Hurst, Karine Icher, Tiffany Joh, Moriya Jutanugarn, Danielle Kang, Kim Kaufman, Megan Khang, Christina Kim, Joanna Klatten, P.K. Kongkraphan, Min Seo Kwak, Maude-Aimee Leblanc, Min Lee, Pernilla Lindberg, Gaby López, Lee Lopez, Sydnee Michaels, Mika Miyazato, Azahara Muñoz, Su-Hyun Oh, Ryann O'Toole, Annie Park, Park Hee-young, Jane Park, Beatriz Recari, Paula Reto, Lizette Salas, Alena Sharp, Kelly Shon, Sarah Jane Smith, Jennifer Song, Nontaya Srisawang, Angela Stanford, Kris Tamulis, Kelly Tan, Ayako Uehara, Mariajo Uribe, Cheyenne Woods, Jing Yan, Julie Yang, Sakura Yokomine

== Course ==
Hole	1	2	3	4	5	6	7	8	9	Out	10	11	12	13	14	15	16	17	18	In	Total
Par	4	3	4	4	3	4	5	3	5	35	4	4	4	5	3	5	3	4	4	36	71
Yards	399	165	355	414	188	384	545	189	505	3,144	417	353	406	499	209	527	155	331	441	3,338	6,482
Metres	365	151	325	379	172	351	498	173	461	2,874	381	323	372	456	191	482	142	303	403	3,052	5,926

Overlooking Lake Geneva, the average elevation of the course is approximately 480 metres (1,575 ft) above sea level.

== Round summaries ==
=== First round ===
Thursday, 15 September 2016

South Koreans Chun In-gee and Park Sung-hyun co-led after the first round at 63 (−8). Defending champion Lydia Ko was seven strokes behind at 70.

Place	Player	Score	To par
T1	(South Korea) Chun In-gee	63	−8
T1	(South Korea) Park Sung-hyun	63	−8
T3	(China) Shanshan Feng	64	−7
T3	(United States) Annie Park	64	−7
5	(United States) Angela Stanford	65	−6
T6	(South Korea) Ji Eun-hee	66	−5
T6	(South Korea) Ryu So-yeon	66	−5
T6	(United States) Danielle Kang	66	−5
T6	(South Korea) Ko Jin-young	66	−5
T6	(China) Lin Xiyu	66	−5
T6	(United States) Brittany Lincicome	66	−5
T6	(Japan) Haru Nomura	66	−5
T6	(United States) Gerina Piller	66	−5
T6	(United States) Jennifer Song	66	−5

=== Second round ===
Friday, 16 September 2016

With a 66, Chun In-gee extended her lead to two strokes over Shanshan Feng and Park Sung-hyun. The cut was 145 (+3) and 72 players advanced to the weekend.

Place	Player	Score	To par
1	(South Korea) Chun In-gee	63-66=129	−13
T2	(China) Shanshan Feng	64-67=131	−11
T2	(South Korea) Park Sung-hyun	63-68=131	−11
4	(South Korea) Ryu So-yeon	66-66=132	−10
5	(United States) Angela Stanford	65-68=133	−9
T6	(South Korea) Ji Eun-hee	66-68=134	−8
T6	(United States) Brittany Lincicome	68-66=134	−8
8	(United States) Jennifer Song	68-67=135	−7
T9	(United States) Danielle Kang	68-68=136	−6
T9	(Chinese Taipei) Candie Kung	69-67=136	−6

=== Third round ===
Saturday, 17 September 2016

Chun In-gee shot 65 (−6) for 194 (−19) to stretch her lead to four strokes over Park Sung-hyun.

Place	Player	Score	To par
1	(South Korea) Chun In-gee	63-66-65=194	−19
2	(South Korea) Park Sung-hyun	63-68-67=198	−15
3	(China) Shanshan Feng	64-67-69=200	−13
4	(South Korea) Ryu So-yeon	66-66-69=201	−12
5	(South Korea) In-Kyung Kim	70-69-64=203	−10
6	(United States) Angela Stanford	65-68-71=204	−9
7	(South Korea) Kim Sei-young	69-71-65=205	−8
T8	(Japan) Haru Nomura	68-69-69=206	−7
T8	(United States) Jane Park	71-68-67=206	−7
T10	(Canada) Brooke Henderson	69-71-67=207	−6
T10	(United States) Gerina Piller	68-72-67=207	−6
T10	(United States) Jennifer Song	68-67-72=207	−6

=== Final round ===
Sunday, 18 September 2016

Chun In-gee completed her wire-to-wire victory with 69 for 263, four strokes over Park Sung-hyun and Ryu So-yeon. Her 21-under-par total was a record for both women and men. For men's majors, the record is 20 under par, held by Jason Day at the 2015 PGA Championship and Henrik Stenson at the 2016 Open Championship. The previous women's record of 19-under-par was shared by five: Dottie Pepper (1999 Nabisco Dinah Shore), Karen Stupples (2004 Women's British Open), Cristie Kerr (2010 LPGA Championship), Yani Tseng (2011 LPGA Championship, and Inbee Park (2015 KPMG Women's PGA Championship). Her 72-hole total of 263 broke the record of 267 held by Betsy King (1992 LPGA Championship) and was one stroke better than Stenson's 264 at the 2016 Open.

Place	Player	Score	To par	Money (US$)
1	(South Korea) Chun In-gee	63-66-65-69=263	−21	487,500
T2	(South Korea) Park Sung-hyun	63-68-67-69=267	−17	259,576
T2	(South Korea) Ryu So-yeon	66-66-69-66=267	−17	259,576
4	(China) Shanshan Feng	64-67-69-69=269	−15	168,848
5	(South Korea) Kim Sei-young	69-71-65-65=270	−14	135,904
6	(South Korea) In-Kyung Kim	70-69-64-69=272	−12	111,194
7	(United States) Angela Stanford	65-68-71-70=274	−10	93,074
8	(Japan) Haru Nomura	68-69-69-69=275	−9	81,543
T9	(Canada) Brooke Henderson	69-71-67-70=277	−7	67,265
T9	(Thailand) Ariya Jutanugarn	73-67-70-67=277	−7	67,265
T9	(United States) Gerina Piller	68-72-67-70=277	−7	67,265

==== Scorecard ====
Final round

Hole	1	2	3	4	5	6	7	8	9	10	11	12	13	14	15	16	17	18
Par	4	3	4	4	3	4	5	3	5	4	4	4	5	3	5	3	4	4
(South Korea) Chun	−19	−19	−20	−20	−20	−20	−20	−21	−21	−21	−21	−21	−21	−20	−21	−21	−21	−21
(South Korea) Park	−14	−15	−15	−16	−16	−16	−16	−15	−15	−16	−16	−15	−15	−15	−17	−17	−17	−17
(South Korea) Ryu	−13	−14	−14	−14	−15	−15	−15	−15	−15	−15	−15	−15	−15	−15	−16	−16	−17	−17
(China) Feng	−13	−13	−13	−14	−13	−13	−14	−15	−16	−14	−14	−14	−14	−14	−15	−15	−15	−15
(South Korea) Kim S.Y.	−8	−9	−8	−8	−8	−8	−9	−9	−10	−11	−11	−10	−12	−12	−13	−13	−14	−14
(South Korea) Kim I.K.	−11	−10	−11	−10	−11	−11	−10	−11	−11	−11	−10	−10	−10	−9	−10	−11	−12	−12

Cumulative tournament scores, relative to par

Eagle	Birdie	Bogey	Double bogey
