= Golf at the 2016 Summer Olympics – Qualification =

Qualification for Golf at the 2016 Summer Olympics in Rio de Janeiro, Brazil was determined not by any form of qualifying tournament, but by the rankings maintained by the International Golf Federation.

Qualification was based on world ranking (Official World Golf Ranking for men, Women's World Golf Rankings for women) as of 11 July 2016, with a total of 60 players qualifying in each of the men's and women's events. The top 15 players of each gender qualified, with a limit of four golfers per country that could qualify this way. The remaining spots went to the highest-ranked players from countries that did not already have two golfers qualified, with a limit of two per country. The IGF guaranteed that at least one golfer would qualify from the host nation and also at least one from each continent (Africa, the Americas, Asia, Europe, and Oceania). The IGF posted weekly lists of qualifiers based on current rankings for men and women.

== Qualified players ==
=== Men ===
Rank	Name	Country	World Ranking
1	Bubba Watson	United States	5
2	Henrik Stenson	Sweden	6
3	Rickie Fowler	United States	7
4	Danny Willett	Great Britain	9
5	Justin Rose	Great Britain	11
6	Sergio García	Spain	12
7	Patrick Reed	United States	13
8	Matt Kuchar	United States	15
9	Rafa Cabrera-Bello	Spain	28
10	An Byeong-hun	South Korea	31
11	Thongchai Jaidee	Thailand	38
12	Danny Lee	New Zealand	40
13	Emiliano Grillo	Argentina	44
14	David Lingmerth	Sweden	48
15	Søren Kjeldsen	Denmark	50
16	Bernd Wiesberger	Austria	51
17	Martin Kaymer	Germany	52
18	Kiradech Aphibarnrat	Thailand	53
19	Anirban Lahiri	India	62
20	Thorbjørn Olesen	Denmark	64
21	Joost Luiten	Netherlands	65
22	Thomas Pieters	Belgium	66
23	Jaco van Zyl	South Africa	67
24	Fabián Gómez	Argentina	73
25	Wang Jeung-hun	South Korea	76
26	Scott Hend	Australia	81
27	Marcus Fraser	Australia	86
28	Brandon Stone	South Africa	92
29	Yuta Ikeda	Japan	93
30	Shingo Katayama	Japan	107
31	Grégory Bourdy	France	112
32	Julien Quesne	France	123
33	Nicolas Colsaerts	Belgium	124
34	Ricardo Gouveia	Portugal	125
35	David Hearn	Canada	127
36	Wu Ashun	China	129
37	Miguel Tabuena	Philippines	140
38	Li Haotong	China	141
39	Alex Čejka	Germany	143
40	Graham DeLaet	Canada	146
41	Fabrizio Zanotti	Paraguay	147
42	Pádraig Harrington	Ireland	148
43	Ryan Fox	New Zealand	184
44	Shiv Chawrasia	India	207
45	Danny Chia	Malaysia	230
46	Mikko Ilonen	Finland	235
47	Jhonattan Vegas	Venezuela	240
48	Felipe Aguilar	Chile	248
49	Pan Cheng-tsung	Chinese Taipei	256
50	Adilson da Silva	Brazil	271
51	Séamus Power	Ireland	290
52	Espen Kofstad	Norway	291
53	Roope Kakko	Finland	293
54	Nino Bertasio	Italy	299
55	Siddikur Rahman	Bangladesh	308
56	Lin Wen-tang	Chinese Taipei	315
57	Gavin Green	Malaysia	321
58	Matteo Manassero	Italy	342
59	Rodolfo Cazaubón	Mexico	344
60	José-Filipe Lima	Portugal	392

The following men removed themselves from possible qualification:

- Jason Day, Marc Leishman, Matt Jones, and Adam Scott of Australia
- Camilo Villegas of Colombia
- Vijay Singh of Fiji
- Victor Dubuisson of France
- Shane Lowry, Graeme McDowell, and Rory McIlroy of Ireland
- Francesco Molinari of Italy
- Hideki Matsuyama and Hideto Tanihara of Japan
- Tim Wilkinson of New Zealand
- Angelo Que of Philippines
- Branden Grace, Louis Oosthuizen, and Charl Schwartzel of South Africa
- Kim Kyung-tae of South Korea
- Miguel Ángel Jiménez of Spain
- Dustin Johnson and Jordan Spieth of the United States
- Brendon de Jonge of Zimbabwe

The Zika virus, which can cause serious birth defects and is currently epidemic in Brazil, can live longer in semen than in blood, and might thus infect a male golfer's partner for up to six months later or even more. Consequently, far more top male golfers than top female golfers withdrew from the games.

==== Qualification by country ====
Number of male golfers from each country participating in the 2016 Summer Olympics: Four Two One None

Americas (13)	Europe (25)	Oceania (4)	Asia (16)	Africa (2)
Argentina (2)	Austria (1)	Australia (2)	Bangladesh (1)	South Africa (2)
Brazil (1)	Belgium (2)	New Zealand (2)	China (2)	
Canada (2)	Denmark (2)		Chinese Taipei (2)	
Chile (1)	Finland (2)		India (2)	
Mexico (1)	France (2)		Japan (2)	
Paraguay (1)	Germany (2)		Malaysia (2)	
United States (4)	Great Britain (2)		Philippines (1)	
Venezuela (1)	Ireland (2)		South Korea (2)	
	Italy (2)		Thailand (2)	
	Netherlands (1)			
Norway (1)
Portugal (2)
Spain (2)
Sweden (2)

=== Women ===
Rank	Name	Country	World Ranking
1	Lydia Ko	New Zealand	1
2	Brooke Henderson	Canada	2
3	Inbee Park	South Korea	3
4	Lexi Thompson	United States	4
5	Kim Sei-young	South Korea	5
6	Amy Yang	South Korea	6
7	Ariya Jutanugarn	Thailand	7
8	Chun In-gee	South Korea	8
9	Stacy Lewis	United States	9
10	Anna Nordqvist	Sweden	11
11	Shanshan Feng	China	13
12	Minjee Lee	Australia	14
13	Gerina Piller	United States	15
14	Suzann Pettersen	Norway	18
15	Haru Nomura	Japan	22
16	Charley Hull	Great Britain	27
17	Teresa Lu	Chinese Taipei	28
18	Candie Kung	Chinese Taipei	32
19	Pornanong Phatlum	Thailand	34
20	Carlota Ciganda	Spain	36
21	Su-Hyun Oh	Australia	41
22	Shiho Oyama	Japan	43
23	Azahara Muñoz	Spain	48
24	Xi Yu Lin	China	50
25	Sandra Gal	Germany	55
26	Karine Icher	France	60
27	Catriona Matthew	Great Britain	63
28	Caroline Masson	Germany	77
29	Nicole Broch Larsen	Denmark	88
30	Pernilla Lindberg	Sweden	90
31	Alena Sharp	Canada	91
32	Gaby López	Mexico	98
33	Mariajo Uribe	Colombia	103
34	Nanna Koerstz Madsen	Denmark	109
35	Paula Reto	South Africa	122
36	Gwladys Nocera	France	134
37	Julieta Granada	Paraguay	135
38	Kelly Tan	Malaysia	153
39	Marianne Skarpnord	Norway	155
40	Ashleigh Simon	South Africa	214
41	Laetitia Beck	Israel	223
42	Giulia Molinaro	Italy	251
43	Ursula Wikström	Finland	256
44	Noora Tamminen	Finland	274
45	Klára Spilková	Czech Republic	279
46	Christine Wolf	Austria	317
47	Giulia Sergas	Italy	326
48	Maria Verchenova	Russia	338
49	Leona Maguire (a)	Ireland	353
50	Albane Valenzuela (a)	Switzerland	378
51	Alejandra Llaneza	Mexico	385
52	Chloe Leurquin	Belgium	402
53	Fabienne In-Albon	Switzerland	408
54	Tiffany Chan (a)	Hong Kong	434
55	Michelle Koh	Malaysia	443
56	Aditi Ashok	India	444
57	Miriam Nagl	Brazil	445
58	Victoria Lovelady	Brazil	458
59	Stephanie Meadow	Ireland	492
60	Maha Haddioui	Morocco	560

(a) = amateur

The following women removed themselves from possible qualification:

- Dottie Ardina of Philippines
- Lee-Anne Pace of South Africa

The following women were removed from possible qualification by their NOC:

- Christel Boeljon (ranked 35) and Anne van Dam (51) and first replacement Dewi Schreefel of the Netherlands
- Cathryn Bristow (ranked 58) of New Zealand

==== Qualification by country ====
Number of female golfers from each country participating in the 2016 Summer Olympics: Four Three Two One None

America (11)	Europe (27)	Oceania (3)	Asia (16)	Africa (3)
Brazil (2)	Austria (1)	Australia (2)	China (2)	Morocco (1)
Canada (2)	Belgium (1)	New Zealand (1)	Chinese Taipei (2)	South Africa (2)
Colombia (1)	Czech Republic (1)		Hong Kong (1)	
Mexico (2)	Denmark (2)		India (1)	
Paraguay (1)	Finland (2)		Japan (2)	
United States (3)	France (2)		Malaysia (2)	
	Germany (2)		South Korea (4)	
	Great Britain (2)		Thailand (2)	
	Ireland (2)			
Israel (1)*
Italy (2)
Norway (2)
Russia (1)
Spain (2)
Sweden (2)
Switzerland (2)

* Israel is a member of the European Olympic Committees.
