= 2011 LPGA of Korea Tour =

This is a summary of the 2011 KLPGA Tour.

Dates	Tournament	Host city	Prize fund (KRW)	Winner
Dec 17–19	Hyundai China Ladies Open	(China) Xiamen	$250,000	(South Korea) Kim Hye-youn (3)
Apr 14–17	Lotte Mart Ladies Open	(South Korea) Seogwipo	500,000,000	(South Korea) Shim Hyun-hwa (1)
Apr 22–24	Hyundai E&C Seokyung Ladies Open	(South Korea) Suwon	600,000,000	(South Korea) Kim Ha-Neul (4)
May 12–15	**Taeyoung Cup Korea Women's Open**	(South Korea) Gyeongju	500,000,000	(South Korea) Jeong Yeon-joo (1)
May 20–22	Rush & Cash Charity Classic	(South Korea) Jeju City	500,000,000	(South Korea) Lee Seung-hyun (1)
May 26–29	Doosan Match Play Championship	(South Korea) Chuncheon	500,000,000	(South Korea) Yang Soo-jin (3)
Jun 3–5	Woori Investment & Securities Ladies Championship	(South Korea) Pocheon	500,000,000	(South Korea) Yoon Seul-a (1)
Jun 10-12	SBS Tour Lotte Cantata Ladies Open	(South Korea) Seogwipo	500,000,000	(South Korea) Ryu So-yeon (7)
Jun 17–19	S-Oil Champions Invitational	(South Korea) Jeju City	400,000,000	(South Korea) Lee Mi-rim (1)
Jul 29–31	SBS Tour Hidden Valley Ladies Open	(South Korea) Jincheon	300,000,000	(South Korea) Byun Hyun-min (1)
Aug 18–21	Nefs Masterpiece	(South Korea) Jeju City	600,000,000	(South Korea) Lee Jeong-eun (4)
Aug 26–28	LIG Classic	(South Korea) Pocheon	400,000,000	(South Korea) Moon Hyun-hee (2)
Sep 1–4	Hanwha Finance Classic	(South Korea) Taean	1,000,000,000	(South Korea) Na Yeon Choi (7)
Sep 22–25	**MetLife-Hankyung KLPGA Championship**	(South Korea) Pyeongchang	700,000,000	(South Korea) Choi Hye-jung (2)
Sep 30–Oct 2	GoldenAge Cup Daewoo Securities Classic	(South Korea) Icheon	500,000,000	(South Korea) Park Yu-na (1)
Oct 7–9	LPGA Hana Bank Championship	(South Korea) Incheon	$1,800,000	(Taiwan) Yani Tseng (n/a)
Oct 13–16	**Hite Jinro Championship**	(South Korea) Yeoju	600,000,000	(South Korea) Kim Ha-Neul (5)
Oct 27-30	**KB Star Championship**	(South Korea) Incheon	700,000,000	(South Korea) Amy Yang (1)
Nov 4–6	eDaily-KYJ Golf Ladies Open	(South Korea) Seogwipo	400,000,000	(South Korea) Kim Ha-Neul (6)
Nov 18–20	ADT CAPS Championship	(South Korea) Seogwipo	400,000,000	(South Korea) Cho Young-ran (2)

Events in bold are majors.

LPGA Hana Bank Championship is co-sanctioned with LPGA Tour.

== See also ==
- 2011 in golf
