= 2014 LPGA of Korea Tour =

The 2014 LPGA of Korea Tour was the 37th season of the LPGA of Korea Tour, the professional golf tour for women operated by the Korea Ladies Professional Golf' Association. It consisted of 29 golf tournaments, 25 played in South Korea, two in China, one in Taiwan, and one in Japan. Kim Hyo-joo won five tournaments and was the leading money winner with earnings of ₩1,208,978,590.

== Schedule ==
The number in parentheses after winners' names show the player's total number wins in official money individual events on the LPGA of Korea Tour, including that event.

Date	Tournament	Host city	Prize fund (KRW)	Winner
Dec 8	Swinging Skirts World Ladies Masters	(Taiwan) Taipei	US$800,000	(New Zealand) Lydia Ko (1)
Dec 15	Hyundai China Ladies Open	(China) Qingcheng	US$400,000	(South Korea) Jang Ha-na (5)
Apr 13	Lotte Mart Women's Open	(South Korea) Jeju	500,000,000	(South Korea) Lee Min-young (2)
Apr 27	Nexen-Saintnine Masters	(South Korea) Gimhae	500,000,000	(South Korea) Baek Kyu-jung (1)
May 4	KG-Edaily Ladies Open	(South Korea) Muju	500,000,000	(South Korea) Lee Seung-hyun (3)
May 18	Woori Ladies Championship	(South Korea) Pocheon	500,000,000	(South Korea) Kim Sei-young (4)
May 25	Doosan Match Play Championship	(South Korea) Chuncheon	600,000,000	(South Korea) Yoon Seul-a (3)
Jun 1	E1 Charity Open	(South Korea) Icheon	600,000,000	(South Korea) Heo Yoon-kyung (2)
Jun 8	Lotte Cantata Women's Open	(South Korea) Jeju	500,000,000	(South Korea) Baek Kyu-jung (2)
Jun 15	S-Oil Champions Invitational	(South Korea) Jeju	600,000,000	(South Korea) Chun In-gee (2)
Jun 22	**Kia Motors Korea Women's Open Championship**	(South Korea) Incheon	700,000,000	(South Korea) Kim Hyo-joo (3)
Jul 6	Kumho Tire Women's Open	(China) Weihai	500,000,000	(South Korea) Kim Hyo-joo (4)
Jul 20	Jeju Samdasoo Masters	(South Korea) Jeju	500,000,000	(South Korea) Yoon Chae-young (1)
Aug 3	Hanwha Finance Classic	(South Korea) Taean	1,200,000,000	(South Korea) Kim Hyo-joo (5)
Aug 10	KyoChon Honey Ladies Open	(South Korea) Daegu	500,000,000	(South Korea) Lee Jung-min (3)
Aug 17	Nefs Masterpiece	(South Korea) Hongcheon	600,000,000	(South Korea) Ko Jin-young (1)
Aug 24	MBN Ladies Open	(South Korea) Yangpyeong	500,000,000	(South Korea) Kim Sei-young (5)
Aug 31	Charity High1 Resort Open	(South Korea) Jeongseon	800,000,000	(South Korea) Jang Ha-na (6)
Sep 14	YTN-Volvik Women's Open	(South Korea) Eumseong	500,000,000	(South Korea) Lee Jung-min (4)
Sep 21	**MefLife-Hankyung KLPGA Championship**	(South Korea) Ansan	700,000,000	(South Korea) Baek Kyu-jung (3)
Sep 28	KDB Daewoo Securities Classic	(South Korea) Pyeongchang	600,000,000	(South Korea) Chun In-gee (3)
Oct 5	OK! Savings Bank Pak Se-ri Invitational	(South Korea) Yeoju	600,000,000	(South Korea) Lee Min-young (3)
Oct 12	**Hite Jinro Championship**	(South Korea) Yeoju	800,000,000	(South Korea) Kim Hyo-joo (6)
Oct 19	LPGA KEB-HanaBank Championship	(South Korea) Incheon	US$2,000,000	(South Korea) Baek Kyu-jung (4)
Oct 26	**KB Financial Star Championship**	(South Korea) Gwangju, Gyeonggi	700,000,000	(South Korea) Kim Hyo-joo (7)
Nov 2	Seokyung Ladies Classic	(South Korea) Yongin	500,000,000	(South Korea) Heo Yoon-kyung (3)
Nov 9	ADT CAPS Championship	(South Korea) Gimhae	500,000,000	(South Korea) Kim Min-sun (1)
Nov 16	Chosun Ilbo-POSCO Championship	(South Korea) Songdo, Incheon	700,000,000	(South Korea) Chun In-gee (4)
Dec 7	Korea-Japan Women's National Golf Team Match Play Competition	(Japan) Aichi	¥61,500,000	South Korea

Events in bold are majors.

LPGA KEB-HanaBank Championship was co-sanctioned with LPGA Tour.
Kumho Tire Women's Open was co-sanctioned with China LPGA Tour.
