= 2010 LPGA of Korea Tour =

The 2010 LPGA of Korea Tour was a series of weekly golf tournaments for female golfers that took place in Korea and China from December 2009 through November 2010.. The tournaments were sanctioned by the LPGA of Korea Tour (KLPGA), a second-tier world golf tour for women.

The tour included 22 tournaments, all were held in Korea except the season-opening Orient China Ladies Open which was held in China. Lee Bo-mee topped the money list with winnings of (₩557,376,856).

== 2010 Schedule and results ==
Dates	Tournament	Host city	Prize fund (KRW)	Winner
Dec 17–19	Orient China Ladies Open	(China) Xiamen	$250,000	(South Korea) Ryu So-yeon (6)
Apr 7–9	KYJ Golf Ladies Open	(South Korea) Seogwipo	200,000,000	(South Korea) Lee Bo-mee (2)
Apr 14–16	J Golf Series Lotte Mart Ladies Open	(South Korea) Seogwipo	500,000,000	(South Korea) Kim Bo-bae (1)
May 7–9	J Golf Series Rush n Cash Charity Classic	(South Korea) Jeju City	500,000,000	(South Korea) Kim Hye-youn (2)
May 14–16	**Taeyoung Cup Korea Women's Open**	(South Korea) Gyeongju	500,000,000	(South Korea) Yang Soo-jin (1)
May 20–23	Doosan Match Play Championship	(South Korea) Chuncheon	400,000,000	(South Korea) Lee Jung-min (1)
Jun 4–6	Woori Investment & Securities Ladies Championship	(South Korea) Pocheon	300,000,000	(South Korea) Lee Hyeon-ju (2)
Jun 9–11	S-Oil Champions Invitational	(South Korea) Jeju City	300,000,000	(South Korea) Hong Ran (3)
Jul 30 – Aug 1	SBS Tour Hidden Valley Ladies Open	(South Korea) Jincheon	300,000,000	(South Korea) Ahn Shin-ae (1)
Aug 4–6	J Golf Series Volvik Lyle & Scott Ladies Open	(South Korea) Hoengseong	400,000,000	(South Korea) Cho Yoon-ji (1)
Aug 13–15	High1 Resort Cup SBS Charity Ladies Open	(South Korea) Jeongseon	800,000,000	(South Korea) Ahn Shin-ae (2)
Aug 19–22	Nefs Masterpiece	(South Korea) Seogwipo	600,000,000	(South Korea) Ham Young-ae (1)
Aug 27–29	LIG Classic	(South Korea) Pocheon	300,000,000	(South Korea) Bae Hee-kyung (1,a)
Sep 3-5	Hyundai E&C Seokyung Ladies Open	(South Korea) Hwaseong	300,000,000	(South Korea) Lee Jeong-eun (3)
Sep 10–12	Daewoo Securities Classic	(South Korea) Incheon	500,000,000	(South Korea) Lee Bo-mee (3)
Sep 16–19	**J Golf Series MetLife Hankyung KLPGA Championship**	(South Korea) Yongin	700,000,000	(South Korea) Jiyai Shin (20)
Oct 8–10	J Golf Series HiMart Ladies Open	(South Korea) Jangseong	500,000,000	(South Korea) Yang Soo-jin (2)
Oct 14–17	**Hite Cup Championship**	(South Korea) Yeoju	600,000,000	(South Korea) Jang Soo-hwa (1)
Oct 21–24	**KB Star Tour**	(South Korea) Incheon	700,000,000	(South Korea) Lee Bo-mee (4)
Oct 29–31	LPGA Hana Bank Championship	(South Korea) Incheon	$1,800,000	(South Korea) Na Yeon Choi (6)
Nov 5–7	Korea-European Ladies Masters	(South Korea) Seogwipo	400,000,000	(South Korea) Kim Hyun-ji (2)
Nov 19–21	ADT CAPS Championship	(South Korea) Seogwipo	400,000,000	(South Korea) Pyun Ae-ree (1)

Events in bold are majors.

LPGA Hana Bank Championship is co-sanctioned with LPGA. Daishin Securities-Tomato Tour Korean Ladies Masters is co-sanctioned with Ladies European Tour.

== See also ==
- 2010 in golf
