= 2016 International Crown =

Coordinates: 42.335°N 87.955°W

Tournament information
- Dates: July 21–24, 2016
- Location: Libertyville, Illinois, U.S.
- Course: Merit Club
- Organized by: LPGA
- Format: Team – match play

Statistics
- Par: 72
- Length: 6,668 yards (6,097 m)
- Field: 32 players; 8 nations, 4 players each
- Cut: 20 players to Sunday singles (5 teams)
- Prize fund: $1.6 million
- Winner's share: $400,000 team ($100,000 per player)

Champion
- United States
- 13 points, (6–3–1, .650)

Location in the United States
Location in Illinois

The 2016 International Crown was a women's golf team event organized by the LPGA, played July 21–24 at the Merit Club in Libertyville, Illinois, north of Chicago. This was the second International Crown, a biennial match play event contested between teams of four players representing eight countries.

== Format ==
The first three days, Thursday through Saturday, featured round-robin pool play matches at fourball. Each match was worth two points for a win and one point for a halve. Following the completion of pool play, the top two teams in each pool and one wild card team advanced to singles play. The five remaining teams were re-seeded based on points earned in pool play, and each team played one singles match against each of the other teams on Sunday. The total points earned in pool and singles play determined the team champion.

== Course ==
Hole	1	2	3	4	5	6	7	8	9	Out	10	11	12	13	14	15	16	17	18	In	Total
Yards	431	194	544	402	367	262	179	468	216	3,063	577	349	433	382	152	385	490	443	394	3,605	6,668
Par	4	3	5	4	4	4	3	5	3	35	5	4	4	4	3	4	5	4	4	37	72

== Teams ==
On April 3, 2016, eight teams qualified to participate in this event, based on the combined world rankings of the top four players from each country: South Korea, United States, Japan, Chinese Taipei, Thailand, England, China and Australia. Defending champion Spain did not qualify. The team members were finalized on June 13, 2016, and divided into two pools. The top two teams from 2014, Spain and Sweden, failed to make the 2016 field. China and England made the field for the first time.

Teams
Pool	Seed	Rank	Country
A	1	22	South Korea
B	2	48	United States
B	3	150	Japan
A	4	261	Australia
A	5	264	Chinese Taipei
B	6	298	Thailand
B	7	360	England
A	8	395	China

Pool A	Pool B
#1 South Korea: Rank / Player; 5 / Kim Sei-young; 6 / Chun In-gee; 8 / Amy Yang; 11 / Ryu So-yeon	#2 United States: Rank / Player; 4 / Lexi Thompson; 9 / Stacy Lewis; 15 / Gerina Piller; 20 / Cristie Kerr
#4 Australia: Rank / Player; 13 / Minjee Lee; 40 / Su-Hyun Oh; 53 / Karrie Webb; 155 / Rebecca Artis	#3 Japan: Rank / Player; 22 / Haru Nomura; 42 / Mika Miyazato; 45 / Ayaka Watanabe; 62 / Ai Suzuki
#5 Chinese Taipei: Rank / Player; 25 / Teresa Lu; 37 / Candie Kung; 70 / Yani Tseng; 132 / Ssu-Chia Cheng	#6 Thailand: Rank / Player; 7 / Ariya Jutanugarn; 32 / Pornanong Phatlum; 95 / Moriya Jutanugarn; 164 / Porani Chutichai
#8 China: Rank / Player; 12 / Shanshan Feng; 58 / Lin Xiyu; 115 / Jing Yan; 233 / Simin Feng	#7 England: Rank / Player; 26 / Charley Hull; 102 / Holly Clyburn; 107 / Melissa Reid; 125 / Jodi Ewart Shadoff

Changes:

- for South Korea, Inbee Park (ranked 3) did not play due to an injury and the first alternate Jang Ha-na (10) could not play
- for Japan, Shiho Oyama (41) did not play due to an injury
- for China, Yuting Shi (210) could not play

== Results ==
=== Day one pool play ===
Thursday, July 21, 2016

Pool A

- South Korea vs. China
  - Match 7: Yang/Chun (KOR) defeated Sh. Feng/Lin (CHN), 1 up
  - Match 8: Si. Feng/Yan (CHN) defeated Ryu/Kim (KOR), 1 up
- Australia vs. Chinese Taipei
  - Match 1: Tseng/Lu (TPE) defeated Webb/Oh (AUS), 3 & 2
  - Match 2: Kung/Cheng (TPE) defeated Lee/Artis (AUS), 2 up

Standings

Seed	Team	Points	Win	Loss	Tie
5	Chinese Taipei	4	2	0	0
1	South Korea	2	1	1	0
8	China	2	1	1	0
4	Australia	0	0	2	0

Pool B

- United States vs. England
  - Match 5: Ewart Shadoff/Clyburn (ENG) defeated Kerr/Thompson (USA), 2 & 1
  - Match 6: Hull/Reid (ENG) defeated Piller/Lewis (USA), 2 & 1
- Japan vs. Thailand
  - Match 3: M. Jutanugarn/Phatlum (THA) defeated Miyazato/Nomura (JPN), 2 & 1
  - Match 4: Suzuki/Watanabe (JPN) and Chutichai/A. Jutanugarn (THA), halved

Standings

Seed	Team	Points	Win	Loss	Tie
7	England	4	2	0	0
6	Thailand	3	1	0	1
3	Japan	1	0	1	1
2	United States	0	0	2	0

=== Day two pool play ===
Friday, July 22, 2016

Pool A

- South Korea vs. Chinese Taipei
  - Match 15: Ryu/Kim (KOR) defeated Tseng/Lu (TPE), 3 & 2
  - Match 16: Kung/Cheng (TPE) defeated Yang/Chun (KOR), 2 & 1
- Australia vs. China
  - Match 9: Lee/Oh (AUS) and Sh. Feng/Lin (CHN), halved
  - Match 10: Webb/Artis (AUS) defeated Si. Feng/Yan (CHN), 2 & 1

Standings

Seed	Team	Points	Win	Loss	Tie
5	Chinese Taipei	6	3	1	0
1	South Korea	4	2	2	0
4	Australia	3	1	2	1
8	China	3	1	2	1

Pool B

- United States vs. Thailand
  - Match 13: Piller/Lewis (USA) and M. Jutanugarn/Phatlum (THA), halved
  - Match 14: Kerr/Thompson (USA) defeated Chutichai/A. Jutanugarn (THA), 4 & 3
- Japan vs. England
  - Match 11: Suzuki/Watanabe (JPN) and Ewart Shadoff/Clyburn (ENG), halved
  - Match 12: Miyazato/Nomura (JPN) defeated Hull/Reid (ENG), 1 up (Hull did not play due to illness)

Standings

Seed	Team	Points	Win	Loss	Tie
7	England	5	2	1	1
3	Japan	4	1	1	2
6	Thailand	4	1	1	2
2	United States	3	1	2	1

=== Day three pool play ===
Saturday, July 23, 2016
Sunday, July 24, 2016

Play was suspended due to lightning with only the South Korea/Australia matches yet to be completed. England and the United States advanced to singles play from pool B. Play resumed Sunday morning with South Korea winning both its matches with Australia to advance, along with Chinese Taipei, to singles play.

Pool A

- South Korea vs. Australia
  - Match 23: Yang/Chun (KOR) defeated Lee/Oh (AUS), 1 up
  - Match 24: Ryu/Kim (KOR) defeated Webb/Artis (AUS), 3 & 2
- Chinese Taipei vs. China
  - Match 19: Kung/Lu (TPE) and Sh. Feng/Si. Feng (CHN), halved
  - Match 20: Yan/Lin (CHN) defeated Tseng/Cheng (TPE), 5 & 4

Standings

Seed	Team	Points	Win	Loss	Tie
1	South Korea	8	4	2	0
5	Chinese Taipei	7	3	2	1
8	China	6	2	2	2
4	Australia	3	1	4	1

Pool B

- United States vs. Japan
  - Match 21: Piller/Lewis (USA) defeated Miyazato/Nomura (JPN), 2 & 1
  - Match 22: Kerr/Thompson (USA) defeated Suzuki/Watanabe (JPN), 4 & 2
- Thailand vs. England
  - Match 17: Ewart Shadoff/Clyburn (ENG) defeated Phatlum/Chutichai (THA), 7 & 5
  - Match 18: Hull/Reid (ENG) defeated A. Jutanugarn/M. Jutanugarn/(THA), 2 & 1

Standings

Seed	Team	Points	Win	Loss	Tie
7	England	9	4	1	1
2	United States	7	3	2	1
6	Thailand	4	1	3	2
3	Japan	4	1	3	2

Wild card

China, Japan, and Thailand advanced to the wildcard playoff by finishing third in their pools. Japan advanced when Ayaka Watanabe eagled the first playoff hole.

Standings

Reseed	Team	Points	Win	Loss	Tie
1	England	9	4	1	1
2	South Korea	8	4	2	0
3	United States	7	3	2	1
4	Chinese Taipei	7	3	2	1
5	Japan	4	1	3	2

=== Singles play ===
Sunday, July 24, 2016

- Match 25: Kung (TPE) defeated Suzuki (JPN), 2 & 1
- Match 26: Lewis (USA) defeated Miyazato (JPN), 3 & 2
- Match 27: Piller (USA) defeated Tseng (TPE), 4 & 3
- Match 28: Nomura (JPN) defeated Yang (KOR), 3 & 2
- Match 29: Watanabe (JPN) defeated Clyburn (ENG), 1 up
- Match 30: Lu (TPE) defeated Chun (KOR), 4 & 3
- Match 31: Ewart Shadoff (ENG) defeated Cheng (TPE), 1 up
- Match 32: Ryu (KOR) defeated Thompson (USA), 2 & 1
- Match 33: Kerr (USA) defeated Reid (ENG), 3 & 2
- Match 34: Kim (KOR) defeated Hull (ENG), 5 & 4

== Final standings ==
Place	Team	Points	Win	Loss	Tie	Money ($) (per player)
1	United States	13	6	3	1	100,000
2	South Korea	12	6	4	0	60,000
T3	Chinese Taipei	11	5	4	1	50,000
T3	England	11	5	4	1	50,000
5	Japan	8	3	5	2	42,500
6	China	6	2	2	2	35,000
7	Thailand	4	1	3	2	32,500
8	Australia	3	1	4	1	30,000
