= Hong Jin-joo =

South Korean golfer (born 1983)

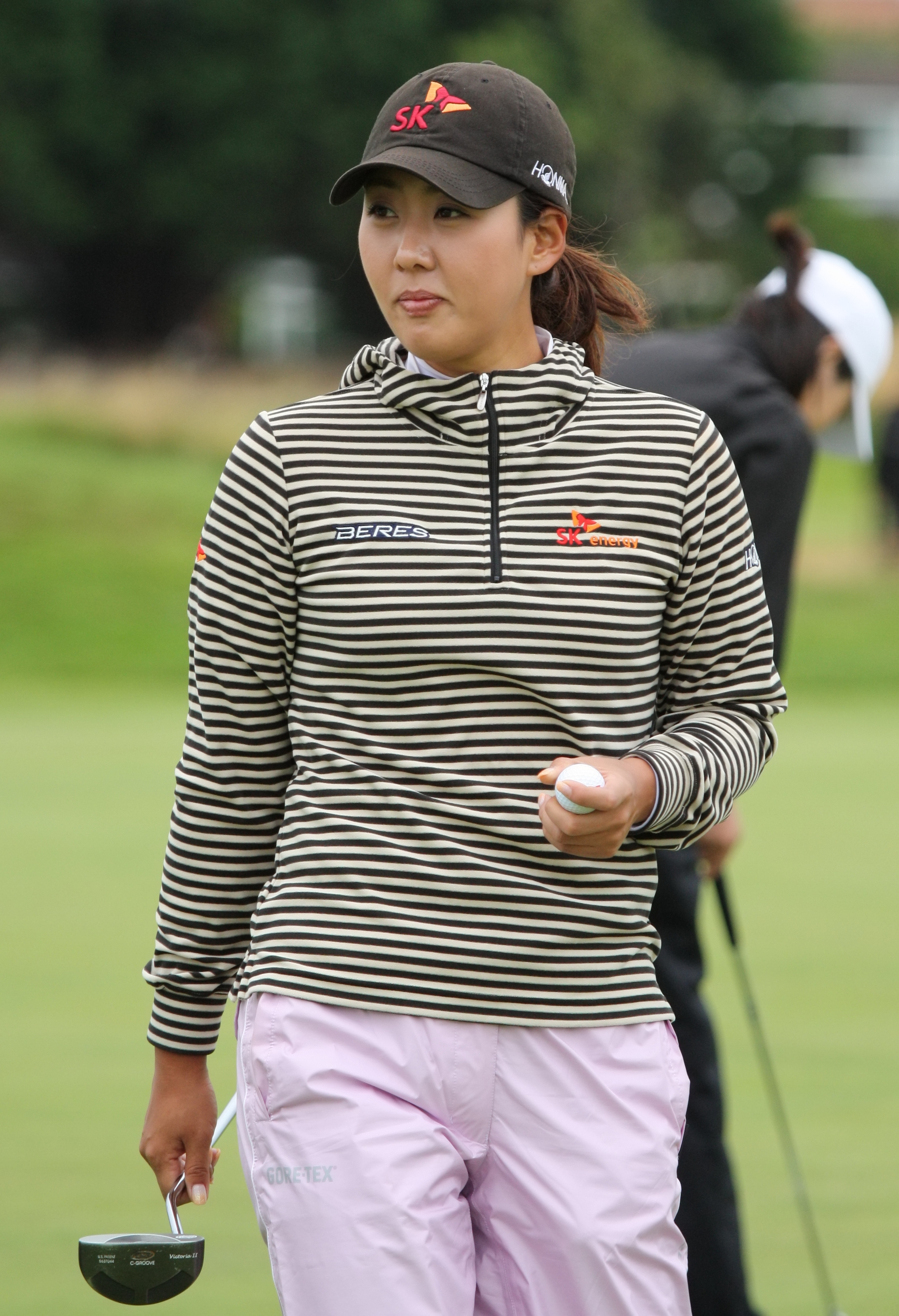
- Hong at the 2009 Women's British Open

Personal information
- Nationality: South Korea
- Born: 28 February 1983 (age 43) Seoul, South Korea
- Height: 5 ft 7 in (1.70 m)

Career
- Sport: Golf
- College: Han-Nam University
- Turned professional: 2003
- Former tours: LPGA of Korea Tour; LPGA Tour
- Professional wins: 3

Number of wins by tour
- LPGA Tour: 1
- LPGA of Korea Tour: 2

Best results in LPGA major championships
- Chevron Championship: 72nd: 2007
- Women's PGA C'ship: T58: 2008
- U.S. Women's Open: CUT: 2007
- Women's British Open: T48: 2008

- Hong Jin-joo
- Hangul: 홍진주
- Hanja: 洪珍珠
- RR: Hong Jinju
- MR: Hong Chinju

Hong Jin-joo or Jin-Joo Hong (Korean: 홍진주, born 28 February 1983) is a South Korean professional golfer who played on the LPGA of Korea Tour (KLPGA). She previously played on the LPGA Tour and has three professional wins.

== Biography ==
Born in Seoul, Hong began to play golf when she was 11 years old. After playing on the LPGA of Korea Tour (KLPGA Tour) from 2004 to 2006, she won the 2006 KOLON-Hana Bank Championship, an event co-sanctioned by the LPGA Tour, to earn exempt status on the LPGA the following year. Hong decided to join the LPGA Tour for the 2007 season, moving from South Korea to the United States. After earning about $162,000 during 2007, she made approximately $339,000 the next season. In her three years on the LPGA Tour, Hong recorded two top-10 finishes; a fourth-place finish in the 2008 Evian Masters was her highest finish after becoming fully exempt on the circuit.

In addition to her KOLON-Hana Bank Championship title, Hong earned a win on the KLPGA Tour in the 2006 season. In 2009, she went back to the KLPGA Tour, and had one top-10 finish, a tie for ninth at the MBC Tour Lotte Mart Ladies Open. Hong placed in the top 10 seven times during the 2010 KLPGA season; her results included a second-place finish in the Woori Investment & Securities Ladies Championship and a tie for fourth at the Korea Women's Open. After playing 11 events in 2011, with a single top-10 performance, she had three top-10s the following year in 16 tournaments; her best result was fourth at the LIG Classic. In 2013, she played on the LPGA of Japan Tour, in addition to one appearance on the KLPGA, and had one top-10 finish in 16 total events, a tie for ninth in the CyberAgent Ladies Golf Tournament. Hong gave birth to a son in 2014, and a subsequent shoulder injury hampered her when she attempted to resume her golfing career. She missed the cut in 10 of 27 tournaments in 2015, although she finished joint second at the Bogner-MBN Ladies Open.

In 2016, Hong won the KLPGA Tour's Fantom Classic in a playoff for her first professional victory since 2006. That was one of her five top-10 finishes for the year, which included a tie for sixth at the Korea Women's Open. Hong missed the cut 11 times in 27 events the following season, with her highest finish a tie for ninth at the World Ladies Championship. In the 2018 season, she played 26 tournaments with one top-10 result, a tie for seventh in the McCol-Yongpyong Resort Open. The following year, Hong made the cut once in her four events played, finishing tied for 35th at the Celltrion Queens Masters. In 16 tournaments played in 2020, she had one top-20 finish.

== Professional wins (3) ==
=== LPGA Tour wins (1) ===
No.	Date	Tournament	Winning score	Margin of victory	Runner-up
1	29 Oct 2006	KOLON-Hana Bank Championship	−11 (68-67-70=205)	3 strokes	(South Korea) Jeong Jang

=== LPGA of Korea Tour wins (2) ===
- 2006 (1) SK EnClean-Solux Invitational
- 2016 (1) Fantom Classic

== Results in LPGA majors ==
Tournament	2007	2008	2009
Kraft Nabisco Championship	72	CUT	CUT
LPGA Championship	CUT	T58	CUT
U.S. Women's Open	CUT		WD
Women's British Open	T58	T48	WD

Did not play

CUT = missed the halfway cut
WD = withdrew
T = tied

== LPGA Tour career summary ==
Year	Tournaments played	Cuts made	Wins	2nds	3rds	Top 10s	Best finish	Earnings ($)	Money list rank	Scoring average
2006	2	2	1	0	0	1	1	217,748	n/a	70.43
2007	21	14	0	0	0	1	T6	162,524	67	73.85
2008	22	17	0	0	0	1	4	339,534	53	72.37
2009	17	12	0	0	0	0	T30	69,412	103	73.21

- Official as of 23 May 2010.
