= CordeValle =

Golf course and spa resort in California, US

CordeValle Golf Club

- Location within the United States Location within California
- 37°04′05″N 121°37′59″W

Club information
- Location: Santa Clara County, near San Martin, California
- Elevation: 330 feet (100 m)
- Established: 1999, 27 years ago
- Type: Private (non-equity) and Resort
- Total holes: 18
- Tournaments: Frys.com Open (2010–2013); PGA Cup (2011, 2015); U.S. Women's Senior Amateur (2013); U.S. Women's Open (2016)
- Greens: Bentgrass / Poa annua
- Fairways: Ryegrass / Poa annua
- Website: www.cordevalle.com
- Designed by: Robert Trent Jones Jr.
- Par: 72 (71, PGA Tour)
- Length: 7,360 yards (6,730 m)
- Course rating: 76.4
- Slope rating: 142

CordeValle is a private golf course and spa resort on the West Coast of the United States, located near San Martin, California, southeast of San Jose. It is in the Santa Clara Valley, near the eastern edge of the Santa Cruz Mountains.

The club's 1996 permit required that 60% of the golf rounds played be reserved for the general public, but the Club defines "general public" as including guests of members. In the resulting dispute with the county planning commission, the club agreed to create a Youth Golf Foundation, to pay for underprivileged youths to learn the game of golf at CordeValle or elsewhere. In exchange, the planning commission agreed to waive the requirement for 60% public play.

Cordevalle is owned by billionaire Hasso Plattner who is the Co-Founder of SAP and majority owner of the San Jose Sharks.

== Events ==
From 2010 to 2013, CordeValle hosted the Frys.com Open on the PGA Tour; in October 2013 it was the first event of the wraparound 2014 season. The tournament was previously conducted at Greyhawk Golf Club in Scottsdale, Arizona, and moved to Silverado Country Club in Napa in October 2014.

CordeValle also hosted the PGA Cup in 2015 and the U.S. Women's Open in 2016.

== Scorecard ==
CordeValle Golf Club
| Tee | Rating/Slope | 1 | 2 | 3 | 4 | 5 | 6 | 7 | 8 | 9 | Out | 10 | 11 | 12 | 13 | 14 | 15 | 16 | 17 | 18 | In | Total |
| SI | Men's | 9 | 15 | 1 | 11 | 3 | 7 | 17 | 13 | 5 | | 10 | 12 | 16 | 4 | 6 | 14 | 18 | 2 | 8 |
| Black | 76.4 / 142 | 425 | 253 | 605 | 407 | 497 | 540 | 210 | 358 | 425 | 3720 | 422 | 434 | 230 | 418 | 457 | 480 | 166 | 478 | 555 | 3640 | 7360 |
| Blue | 74.2 / 139 | 405 | 180 | 565 | 394 | 440 | 520 | 188 | 325 | 410 | 3427 | 404 | 390 | 195 | 382 | 429 | 460 | 148 | 449 | 526 | 3383 | 6810 |
| Green | 72.1 / 131 | 380 | 160 | 529 | 374 | 418 | 500 | 165 | 295 | 397 | 3218 | 384 | 360 | 193 | 366 | 429 | 460 | 148 | 420 | 504 | 3264 | 6482 |
| Par | | 4 | 3 | 5 | 4 | 4 | 5 | 3 | 4 | 4 | 36 | 4 | 4 | 3 | 4 | 4 | 5 | 3 | 4 | 5 | 36 | 72 |
| White | M:70.1/126 W:76.0/139 | 360 | 122 | 505 | 358 | 373 | 480 | 143 | 287 | 375 | 3003 | 365 | 340 | 163 | 346 | 390 | 405 | 127 | 390 | 481 | 3007 | 6010 |
| SI | Women's | 9 | 15 | 1 | 13 | 5 | 3 | 17 | 11 | 7 | | 8 | 14 | 16 | 6 | 10 | 12 | 18 | 2 | 4 |
| Red | 72.1 / 130 | 335 | 92 | 464 | 325 | 356 | 454 | 118 | 262 | 340 | 2746 | 331 | 291 | 106 | 317 | 328 | 374 | 105 | 358 | 429 | 2639 | 5385 |
