= 2018 International Crown =

Tournament information
- Dates: 4–7 October 2018
- Location: Incheon, South Korea; 37.380°N 126.624°E
- Course: Jack Nicklaus Golf Club Korea
- Organized by: LPGA
- Format: Team – match play

Statistics
- Field: 32 players; 8 nations, 4 players each
- Cut: 20 players to Sunday singles (5 teams)
- Prize fund: $1.6 million
- Winner's share: $400,000 team ($100,000 per player)

Champion
- South Korea
- 15 points, (7–2–1, .750)
- Location in South Korea

The 2018 International Crown was a women's golf team event organized by the LPGA, played 4–7 Oct at the Jack Nicklaus Golf Club Korea in Incheon, South Korea. This was the third International Crown, a biennial match play event contested between teams of four players representing eight countries.

Due to the anticipated arrival of Typhoon Kong-rey, the tournament schedule was adjusted; the second round tee times were moved earlier on Friday and the third round, originally scheduled for Saturday, was started on Friday afternoon. The final round was to be played Saturday, 6 October, instead of Sunday. However, typhoon rains arrived earlier than expected so that no matches were played Saturday; the third round was finished Sunday, followed by the singles matches.

== Format ==
The first three rounds featured round-robin pool play matches at fourball. Each match was worth two points for a win and one point for a halve. Following the completion of pool play, the top two teams in each pool and one wild card team advanced to singles play.

These five remaining teams were re-seeded based on points earned in pool play. The players then competed in singles play on Sunday, with the four members of one team each paired up with a member of a different one of the other four teams. The total points earned in pool and singles play determined the team champion.

== Teams ==
On 3 June 2018, eight teams qualified to participate in this event, based on the combined world rankings of the top four players from each country: South Korea, United States, Japan, England, Australia, Thailand, Sweden, and Chinese Taipei. The field was the same as 2016 with the exception of Sweden replacing China. The team members were finalized on 2 July 2018, and the teams were divided into two pools.

Teams
Pool	Seed	Rank	Country
A	1	14	South Korea
B	2	45	United States
B	3	149	Japan
A	4	183	England
A	5	228	Australia
B	6	259	Thailand
B	7	298	Sweden
A	8	332	Chinese Taipei

Rankings as of 2 July 2018

Pool A	Pool B
#1 South Korea: Rank / Player; 2 / Park Sung-hyun; 4 / Ryu So-yeon; 7 / In-Kyung Kim; 18 / Chun In-gee	#2 United States: Rank / Player; 5 / Lexi Thompson; 8 / Jessica Korda; 13 / Cristie Kerr; 19 / Michelle Wie
#4 England: Rank / Player; 23 / Charley Hull; 40 / Georgia Hall; 45 / Jodi Ewart Shadoff; 75 / Bronte Law	#3 Japan: Rank / Player; 12 / Nasa Hataoka; 58 / Misuzu Narita; 59 / Mamiko Higa; 97 / Ayako Uehara
#5 Australia: Rank / Player; 10 / Minjee Lee; 64 / Katherine Kirk; 70 / Sarah Jane Smith; 84 / Su-Hyun Oh	#6 Thailand: Rank / Player; 3 / Ariya Jutanugarn; 9 / Moriya Jutanugarn; 92 / Pornanong Phatlum; 155 / Sherman Santiwiwatthanaphong
#8 Chinese Taipei: Rank / Player; 43 / Teresa Lu; 62 / Wei-Ling Hsu; 106 / Phoebe Yao; 121 / Candie Kung	#7 Sweden: Rank / Player; 15 / Anna Nordqvist; 32 / Pernilla Lindberg; 90 / Madelene Sagström; 161 / Caroline Hedwall

Notes:

- for South Korea, Inbee Park (ranked 1) declined to play and the first two alternates Choi Hye-jin (11) and Ko Jin-young (17) also declined to play
- for Japan, Ayako Uehara replace an injured Ai Suzuki

== Results ==
=== Round one pool play ===
Thursday, 4 October 2018

Pool A

- South Korea vs. Chinese Taipei
  - Match 7: Park/Kim (KOR) defeated Kung/Yao (TPE), 1 up
  - Match 8: Chun/Ryu (KOR) defeated Lu/Hsu (TPE), 2 up
- England vs. Australia
  - Match 1: Hull/Hall (ENG) and Lee/Smith (AUS), halved
  - Match 2: Law/Ewart Shadoff (ENG) defeated Kirk/Oh (AUS), 4 & 3

Standings after round one

Seed	Team	Points	Win	Loss	Tie
1	South Korea	4	2	0	0
4	England	3	1	0	1
5	Australia	1	0	1	1
8	Chinese Taipei	0	0	2	0

Pool B

- United States vs. Sweden
  - Match 5: Kerr/Thompson (USA) defeated Lindberg/Sagström (SWE), 2 up
  - Match 6: Nordqvist/Hedwall (SWE) defeated Korda/Wie (USA), 2 up
- Japan vs. Thailand
  - Match 3: Hataoka/Uehara (JPN) and M Jutanugarn/Phatlum (THA), halved
  - Match 4: A Jutanugarn/Santiwiwatthanaphong (THA) defeated Narita/Higa (JPN), 2 & 1

Standings after round one

Seed	Team	Points	Win	Loss	Tie
6	Thailand	3	1	0	1
2	United States	2	1	1	0
7	Sweden	2	1	1	0
3	Japan	1	0	1	1

=== Round two pool play ===
Friday, 5 October 2018

Pool A

- South Korea vs. Australia
  - Match 15: Ryu/Chun (KOR) defeated Lee/Smith (AUS), 2 & 1
  - Match 16: Oh/Kirk (AUS) defeated Park/Kim (KOR), 3 & 2
- England vs. Chinese Taipei
  - Match 13: Hull/Hall (ENG) defeated Hsu/Lu (TPE), 2 & 1
  - Match 14: Law/Ewart Shadoff (ENG) defeated Kung/Yao (TPE), 6 & 4

Standings after round two

Seed	Team	Points	Win	Loss	Tie
4	England	7	3	0	1
1	South Korea	6	3	1	0
5	Australia	3	1	2	1
8	Chinese Taipei	0	0	4	0

Pool B

- Japan vs. Sweden
  - Match 9: Nordqvist/Hedwall (SWE) defeated Narita/Higa (JPN), 6 & 4
  - Match 10: Uehara/Hataoka (JPN) defeated Lindberg/Sagström (SWE), 4 & 3
- United States vs. Thailand
  - Match 11: Korda/Wie (USA) defeated M Jutanugarn/Phatlum (THA), 6 & 4
  - Match 12: Kerr/Thompson (USA) defeated A Jutanugarn/Santiwiwatthanaphong (THA), 4 & 3

Standings after round two

Seed	Team	Points	Win	Loss	Tie
2	United States	6	3	1	0
7	Sweden	4	2	2	0
6	Thailand	3	1	2	1
3	Japan	3	1	2	1

=== Round three pool play ===
Friday, 5 October 2018
Sunday, 7 October 2018

Pool A

- South Korea vs. England
  - Match 23: Park/Kim (KOR) defeated Hull/Hall (ENG), 4 & 2
  - Match 24: Chun/Ryu (KOR) defeated Ewart Shadoff/Law (ENG), 4 & 3
- Australia vs. Chinese Taipei
  - Match 21: Lee/Smith (AUS) defeated Kung/Lu (TPE), 2 up
  - Match 22: Oh/Kirk (AUS) defeated Hsu/Yao (TPE), 5 & 4

Standings after round three

Seed	Team	Points	Win	Loss	Tie
1	South Korea	10	5	1	0
4	England	7	3	2	1
5	Australia	7	3	2	1
8	Chinese Taipei	0	0	6	0

Pool B

- United States vs. Japan
  - Match 19: Hataoka/Uehara (JPN) defeated Korda/Wie (USA), 2 & 1
  - Match 20: Kerr/Thompson (USA) defeated Narita/Higa (JPN), 4 & 3
- Thailand vs. Sweden
  - Match 17: M Jutanugarn/A Jutanugarn (THA) defeated Nordqvist/Hedwall (SWE), 2 & 1
  - Match 18: Lindberg/Sagström (SWE) defeated Phatlum/Santiwiwatthanaphong (THA), 2 & 1

Standings after round three

Seed	Team	Points	Win	Loss	Tie
2	United States	8	4	2	0
7	Sweden	6	3	3	0
3	Japan	5	2	3	1
6	Thailand	5	2	3	1

Wild card

Australia, Japan, and Thailand advanced to the wildcard playoff by finishing third in their pools. Thailand advanced.

Standings after four ball matches

Reseed	Team	Points	Win	Loss	Tie
1	South Korea	10	5	1	0
2	United States	8	4	2	0
4	England	7	3	2	1
7	Sweden	6	3	3	0
6	Thailand	5	2	3	1

=== Singles play ===
Sunday, 7 October 2018

- Match 25: Hedwall (SWE) and Santiwiwatthanaphong (THA), halved
- Match 26: Hull (ENG) defeated Phatlum (THA), 1 up
- Match 27: Lindberg (SWE) defeated Shadoff (ENG), 1 up
- Match 28: M Jutanugarn (THA) defeated Wie (USA), 2 & 1
- Match 29: A Jutanugarn (THA) defeated Park (KOR), 2 & 1
- Match 30: Korda (USA) defeated Sagstrom (SWE), 4 & 3
- Match 31: Chun (KOR) defeated Nordqvist (SWE), 1 up
- Match 32: Hall (ENG) defeated Kerr (USA), 2 & 1
- Match 33: Kim (KOR) defeated Law (ENG), 2 up
- Match 34: Ryu (KOR) and Thompson (USA), halved

== Final standings ==
Place	Team	Points	Win	Loss	Tie	Money ($) (per player)
1	South Korea	15	7	2	1	100,000
T2	United States	11	5	4	1	56,100
T2	England	11	5	4	1	56,100
4	Thailand	10	4	4	2	47,500
5	Sweden	9	4	5	1	42,500
6	Australia	7	3	2	1	35,000
7	Japan	5	2	3	1	32,500
8	Chinese Taipei	0	0	6	0	30,000
