= 2000 U.S. Women's Open =

Coordinates: 42.335°N 87.955°W

Tournament information
- Dates: July 20–23, 2000
- Location: Libertyville, Illinois
- Course: Merit Club
- Organized by: USGA
- Tour: LPGA Tour

Statistics
- Par: 72
- Length: 6,516 yards (5,958 m)
- Field: 150 players, 60 after cut
- Cut: 150 (+6)
- Prize fund: $2.75 million
- Winner's share: $500,000

Champion
- (Australia) Karrie Webb
- 282 (−6)

Location in the United States
Location in Illinois

The 2000 U.S. Women's Open was the 55th U.S. Women's Open, held July 20–23 at the Merit Club in Libertyville, Illinois, a suburb north of Chicago and west of Waukegan. Karrie Webb won the first of two consecutive U.S. Women's Opens, five strokes ahead of runners-up Cristie Kerr and Meg Mallon. It was the third of Webb's seven major titles.

This was the first time in 19 years that the championship had been held in the Chicago metropolitan area; the Merit Club course opened eight years earlier in 1992. The purse was $2.75 million, an increase of over 57% from the previous year, with a winner's share of $500,000. Webb also picked up an additional $250,000 bonus from the Nabisco Grand Slam Challenge for winning two majors in the same year.

This championship was scheduled concurrently with The Open Championship in Scotland, where Tiger Woods won his fourth straight major title at St. Andrews to secure his historic Tiger Slam.

== Course layout ==
Hole	1	2	3	4	5	6	7	8	9	Out	10	11	12	13	14	15	16	17	18	In	Total
Yards	399	172	499	374	359	366	151	522	388	3,230	410	175	533	354	406	376	167	380	485	3,286	6,516
Par	4	3	5	4	4	4	3	5	4	36	4	3	5	4	4	4	3	4	5	36	72

== Round summaries ==
=== First round ===
Thursday, July 20, 2000

Place	Player	Score	To par
1	(United States) Meg Mallon	68	−4
T2	(Australia) Shani Waugh	69	−3
T2	(Australia) Karrie Webb	69	−3
T4	(United States) Kellee Booth	70	−2
T4	(United States) Juli Inkster	70	−2
T6	(United States) Kristi Albers	71	−1
T6	(United States) Beth Daniel	71	−1
T6	(United States) Jackie Gallagher-Smith	71	−1
T6	(Canada) Lorie Kane	71	−1
T6	(United States) Betsy King	71	−1
T6	(United States) Kelli Kuehne	71	−1
T6	(Taiwan) Yu Ping Lin	71	−1

=== Second round ===
Friday, July 21, 2000

Place	Player	Score	To par
1	(United States) Meg Mallon	68-72=140	−4
T2	(United States) Betsy King	71-70=141	−3
T2	(Australia) Karrie Webb	69-72=141	−3
4	(United States) Cristie Kerr	72-71=143	−1
T5	(England) Laura Davies	73-71=144	E
T5	(United States) Dorothy Delasin	76-68=144	E
T5	(United States) Rosie Jones	73-71=144	E
T5	(United States) Juli Inkster	70-74=144	E
T5	(Scotland) Kathryn Marshall	72-72=144	E
T5	(Australia) Shani Waugh	69-75=144	E

=== Third round ===
Saturday, July 22, 2000

Place	Player	Score	To par
1	(Australia) Karrie Webb	69-72-68=209	−7
2	(United States) Meg Mallon	68-72-73=213	−3
T3	(England) Laura Davies	73-71-72=216	E
T3	(United States) Dorothy Delasin	76-68-72=216	E
T3	(United States) Rosie Jones	73-71-72=216	E
T3	(South Korea) Mi-Hyun Kim	74-72-70=216	E
T7	(United States) Beth Daniel	71-74-72=217	+1
T7	(United States) Pat Hurst	73-72-72=217	+1
T7	(United States) Juli Inkster	70-74-73=217	+1
T7	(Canada) Lorie Kane	71-74-72=217	+1
T7	(United States) Cristie Kerr	72-71-74=217	+1
T7	(Australia) Shani Waugh	69-75-73=217	+1

=== Final round ===
Sunday, July 23, 2000

Place	Player	Score	To par	Money ($)
1	(Australia) Karrie Webb	69-72-68-73=282	−6	500,000
T2	(United States) Cristie Kerr	72-71-74-70=287	−1	240,228
T2	(United States) Meg Mallon	68-72-73-74=287	−1	240,228
T4	(United States) Rosie Jones	73-71-72-72=288	E	120,118
T4	(South Korea) Mi-Hyun Kim	74-72-70-72=288	E	120,118
T6	(United States) Kelli Kuehne	71-74-73-71=289	+1	90,458
T6	(South Korea) Grace Park	74-72-73-70=289	+1	90,458
8	(United States) Beth Daniel	71-74-72-73=290	+2	79,345
T9	(England) Laura Davies	73-71-72-75=291	+3	67,368
T9	(United States) Kelly Robbins	74-73-71-73=291	+3	67,368
T9	(Sweden) Annika Sörenstam	73-75-73-70=291	+3	67,368
