= Ahn Shin-ae =

South Korean professional golfer (born 1990)

Ahn Shin-ae 안신애
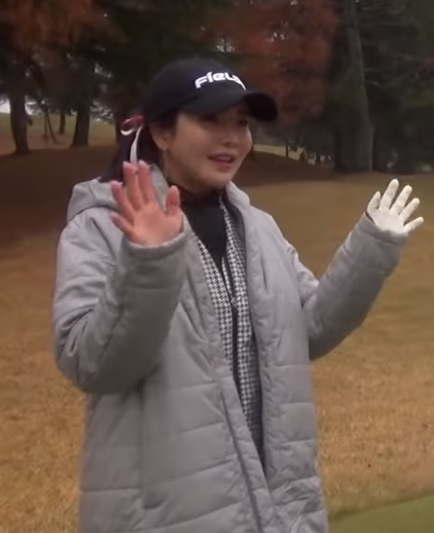

Personal information
- Nationality: South Korea
- Born: 18 December 1990 (age 35) Seoul, South Korea
- Height: 1.65 m (5 ft 5 in)

Career
- Sport: Golf
- Turned professional: 2008
- Professional wins: 3

Number of wins by tour
- LPGA of Korea Tour: 3

Ahn Shin-ae (Korean: 안신애; born 18 December 1990 in Seoul) is a South Korean professional golfer.

== Professional wins (3) ==
=== 2010 LPGA of Korea Tour wins (3) ===
- 2010 SBS Tour Hidden Valley Ladies Open, High1 Resort Cup SBS Charity Ladies Open
- 2015 ISU Group KLPGA Championship
