= Lee Jeong-eun (golfer, born 1988) =

South Korean golfer (born 1988)

Personal information
- Nationality: South Korea
- Born: 20 October 1988 (age 38)
- Height: 5 ft 5 in (165 cm)

Career
- Sport: Golf
- Status: Professional
- Current tour: LPGA Tour
- Former tour: LPGA of Korea Tour
- Professional wins: 5

Number of wins by tour
- LPGA of Korea Tour: 5

Best results in LPGA major championships
- Chevron Championship: T21: 2017
- Women's PGA C'ship: T23: 2020
- U.S. Women's Open: T34: 2010, 2019
- Women's British Open: T11: 2018
- Evian Championship: T29: 2021

Lee Jeong-eun (Korean: 이정은; Hanja: 李政恩; born 20 October 1988) is a South Korean professional golfer. For scoring purposes, she is called Jeongeun Lee5 to differentiate herself from other Korean LPGA golfers with that name, including the younger Jeongeun Lee6.

Lee played on the LPGA of Korea Tour where she won five times between 2009 and 2015. Since 2017, she has played primarily on the LPGA Tour. Her best finish on the LPGA Tour is T-3 at the 2017 ShopRite LPGA Classic.

== LPGA of Korea Tour wins ==
- 2009 (2) Asia Today-KYJ Golf Ladies Open, **Shinsegae KLPGA Championship**
- 2010 (1) Hyundai E&C Seokyung Ladies Open
- 2011 (1) Nefs Masterpiece
- 2015 (1) Jeju Samdasoo Masters

Events in bold are KLPGA majors.

== Results in LPGA majors ==
Results not in chronological order.

| Tournament | 2010 | 2011 | 2012 | 2013 | 2014 | 2015 | 2016 | 2017 | 2018 | 2019 |
|---|---|---|---|---|---|---|---|---|---|---|
| Chevron Championship | | | | | | | | T21 | T37 | CUT |
| Women's PGA Championship | | | | | | | | T57 | 72 | T48 |
| U.S. Women's Open | T34 | | | | | | | CUT | CUT | T34 |
| The Evian Championship ^ | | | | | | | | T40 | T37 | T49 |
| Women's British Open | | | | | | | | CUT | T11 | T44 |

| Tournament | 2020 | 2021 | 2022 | 2023 | 2024 | 2025 |
|---|---|---|---|---|---|---|
| Chevron Championship | | | CUT | | | T79 |
| U.S. Women's Open | CUT | | | | | CUT |
| Women's PGA Championship | T23 | T33 | T25 | | | CUT |
| The Evian Championship | NT | T29 | T50 | | | T38 |
| Women's British Open | | | CUT | | | |

^ The Evian Championship was added as a major in 2013.

Did not play

CUT = missed the half-way cut
NT = no tournament
"T" = tied

=== Summary ===
| Tournament | Wins | 2nd | 3rd | Top-5 | Top-10 | Top-25 | Events | Cuts made |
|---|---|---|---|---|---|---|---|---|
| Chevron Championship | 0 | 0 | 0 | 0 | 0 | 1 | 5 | 3 |
| U.S. Women's Open | 0 | 0 | 0 | 0 | 0 | 0 | 6 | 2 |
| Women's PGA Championship | 0 | 0 | 0 | 0 | 0 | 2 | 7 | 6 |
| Women's British Open | 0 | 0 | 0 | 0 | 0 | 1 | 4 | 2 |
| The Evian Championship | 0 | 0 | 0 | 0 | 0 | 0 | 6 | 6 |
| Totals | 0 | 0 | 0 | 0 | 0 | 4 | 28 | 19 |
