= 2022 Women's PGA Championship =

2022 KPMG Women's PGA Championship
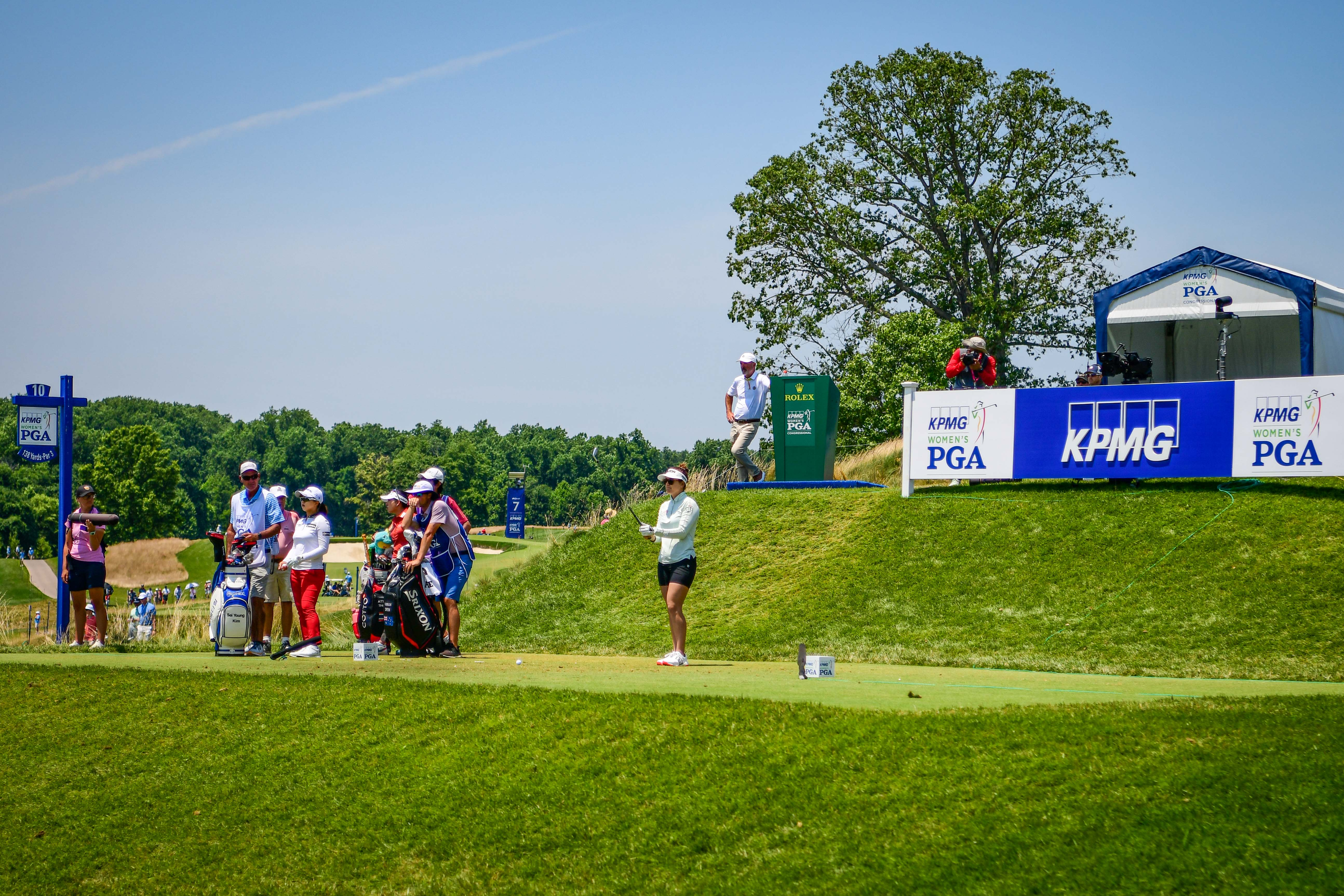
- Hannah Green during the final round

Tournament information
- Dates: June 23–26, 2022
- Location: Bethesda, Maryland
- Course: Congressional Country Club
- Organized by: PGA of America
- Tour: LPGA Tour
- Format: Stroke play - 72 holes

Statistics
- Par: 72
- Length: 6,894 yards (6,304 m)
- Prize fund: $9,000,000
- Winner's share: $1,350,000

Champion
- (South Korea) Chun In-gee
- 283 (−5)

The 2022 KPMG Women's PGA Championship was the 68th Women's PGA Championship, played June 23–26, 2022 at Congressional Country Club in Bethesda, Maryland. It was won by Chun In-gee with an aggregate of 283, five under par. She finished one stroke ahead of Lexi Thompson and Minjee Lee.

== Round summaries ==
=== First round ===
Thursday, June 23, 2022

Place	Player	Score	To par
1	(South Korea) Chun In-gee	64	−8
T2	(South Korea) Choi Hye-jin	69	−3
T2	(Thailand) Pornanong Phatlum	69	−3
T4	(United States) Jennifer Chang	70	−2
T4	(South Africa) Paula Reto	70	−2
T6	(Japan) Ayaka Furue	71	−1
T6	(Australia) Hannah Green	71	−1
T6	(Japan) Nasa Hataoka	71	−1
T6	(Canada) Brooke Henderson	71	−1
T6	(South Korea) Kim A-lim	71	−1
T6	(South Korea) In-Kyung Kim	71	−1
T6	(South Korea) Kim Sei-young	71	−1
T6	(United States) Nelly Korda	71	−1
T6	(United States) Jennifer Kupcho	71	−1

=== Second round ===
Friday, June 24, 2022

Place	Player	Score	To par
1	(South Korea) Chun In-gee	64-69=133	−11
T2	(New Zealand) Lydia Ko	72-67=139	−5
T2	(United States) Jennifer Kupcho	71-68=139	−5
T4	(United States) Jennifer Chang	70-70=140	−4
T4	(Australia) Hannah Green	71-69=140	−4
T4	(Canada) Brooke Henderson	71-69=140	−4
T4	(United States) Caroline Inglis	72-68=140	−4
T4	(South Korea) Kim Sei-young	71-69=140	−4
T9	(South Korea) Choi Hye-jin	69-72=141	−3
T9	(Australia) Minjee Lee	73-68=141	−3
T9	(China) Lin Xiyu	73-68=141	−3
T9	(Thailand) Pornanong Phatlum	69-72=141	−3
T9	(United States) Lexi Thompson	74-67=141	−3

=== Third round ===
Saturday, June 25, 2022

Place	Player	Score	To par
1	(South Korea) Chun In-gee	64-69-75=208	−8
T2	(South Korea) Choi Hye-jin	69-72-70=211	−5
T2	(South Korea) Kim Sei-young	71-69-71=211	−5
T2	(United States) Lexi Thompson	74-67-70=211	−5
5	(Australia) Hannah Green	71-69-72=212	−4
T6	(United States) Jennifer Chang	70-70-73=213	−3
T6	(Canada) Brooke Henderson	71-69-73=213	−3
T6	(United States) Jennifer Kupcho	71-68-74=213	−3
T6	(Thailand) Atthaya Thitikul	73-72-68=213	−3
T10	(Australia) Minjee Lee	73-68-73=214	−2
T10	(Northern Ireland) Stephanie Meadow	73-69-72=214	−2

=== Final round ===
Sunday, June 26, 2022

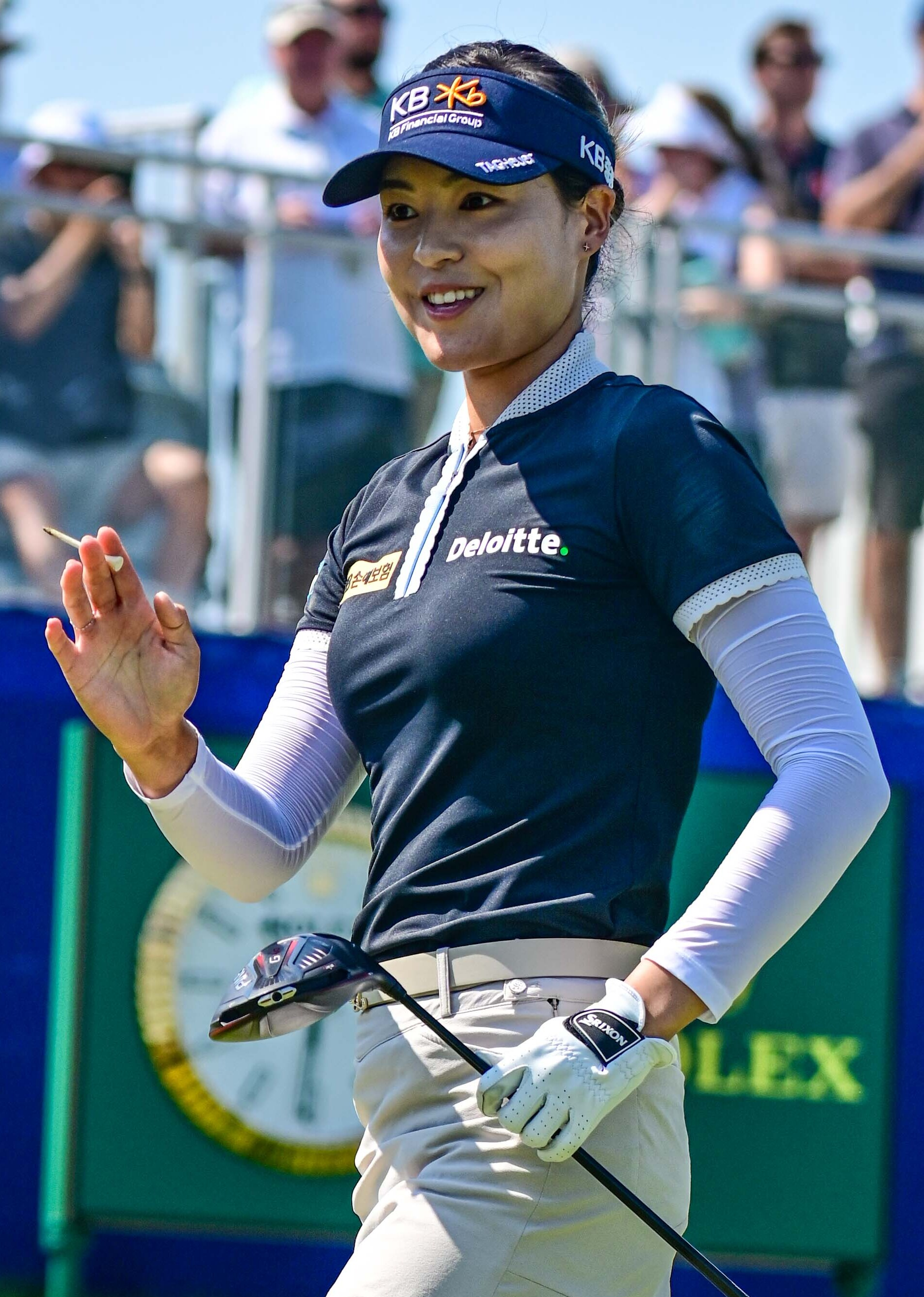
Chun In-gee during the final round.

Place	Player	Score	To par	Prize money ($)
1	(South Korea) Chun In-gee	64-69-75-75=283	−5	1,350,000
T2	(Australia) Minjee Lee	73-68-73-70=284	−4	718,827
T2	(United States) Lexi Thompson	74-67-70-73=284	−4	718,827
4	(Thailand) Atthaya Thitikul	73-72-68-72=285	−3	467,580
T5	(South Korea) Choi Hye-jin	69-72-70-76=287	−1	274,166
T5	(Australia) Hannah Green	71-69-72-75=287	−1	274,166
T5	(Japan) Nasa Hataoka	71-72-75-69=287	−1	274,166
T5	(South Korea) Kim Hyo-joo	73-72-71-71=287	−1	274,166
T5	(South Korea) Kim Sei-young	71-69-71-76=287	−1	274,166
T10	(United States) Jennifer Chang	70-70-73-75=288	E	156,315
T10	(South Korea) Ji Eun-hee	74-70-72-72=288	E	156,315
T10	(United States) Jessica Korda	74-70-71-73=288	E	156,315
T10	(Australia) Stephanie Kyriacou	72-72-72-72=288	E	156,315
T10	(Northern Ireland) Stephanie Meadow	73-69-72-74=288	E	156,315
T10	(United States) Lilia Vu	75-70-73-70=288	E	156,315
