= Merit Club =

Country club in Illinois

Coordinates: 42.335°N 87.955°W

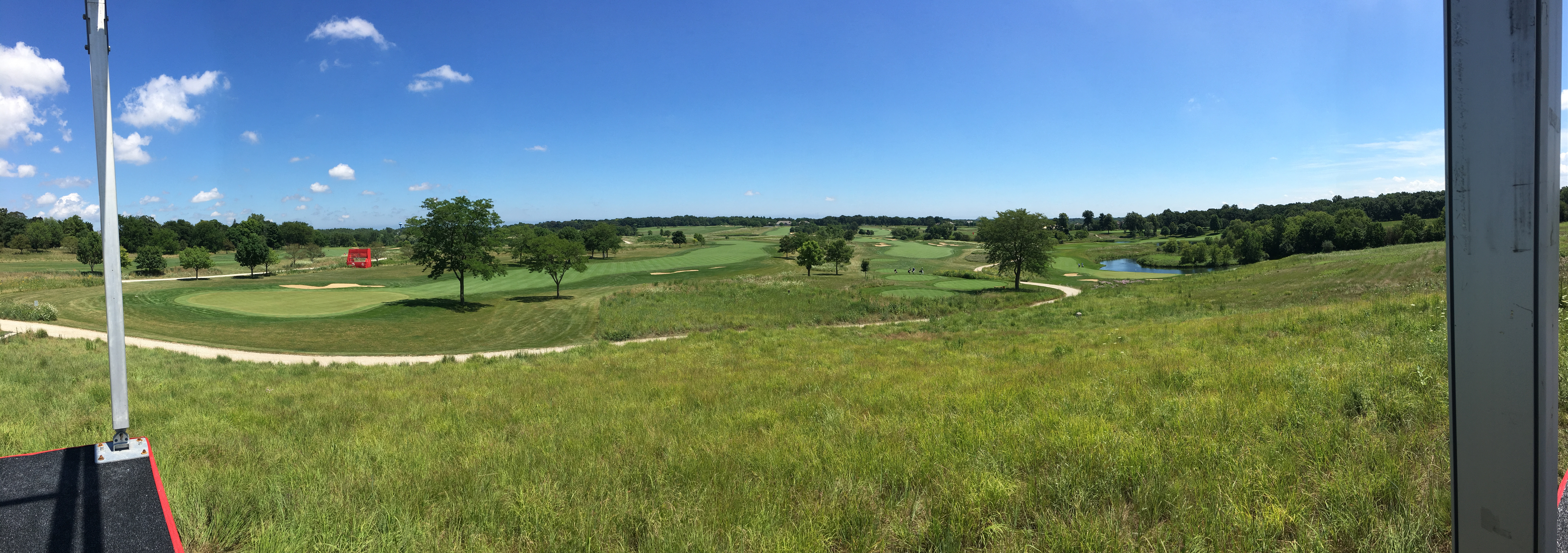
- Hole 13 Tee
- Interactive map of Merit Club

Club information
- Established: 1992
- Type: Private
- Owner: Globe Corporation
- Total holes: 21
- Website: www.meritclub.org

Merit Club is a private country club in Libertyville, Illinois, a suburb north-northwest of Chicago.

The course was founded in 1992 by Bert Getz Sr. and his family and was collaboratively designed by Getz, Oscar Miles, Bob Lohmann and Ed Oldfield. The course architect was Bob Lohmann. It features a 6,960-yard (6,364 m) 18-hole course. The Merit Club also has three practice holes: par 4, par 3, and par 4.

Merit Club hosted the U.S. Women's Open in 2000, won by Karrie Webb and it hosted the second edition of the LPGA UL International Crown on July 21 through July 24, 2016, won by the United States.

The course was ranked in the top 100 golf courses in the United States by both Golf Week and Golf Magazine.

The Head Golf Professional is Donald W. Pieper, PGA

Merit Club has had a caddie program since its opening. The Caddie Master is Rafael Rivera, Jr.
