= Chun In-gee =

South Korean professional golfer (born 1994)

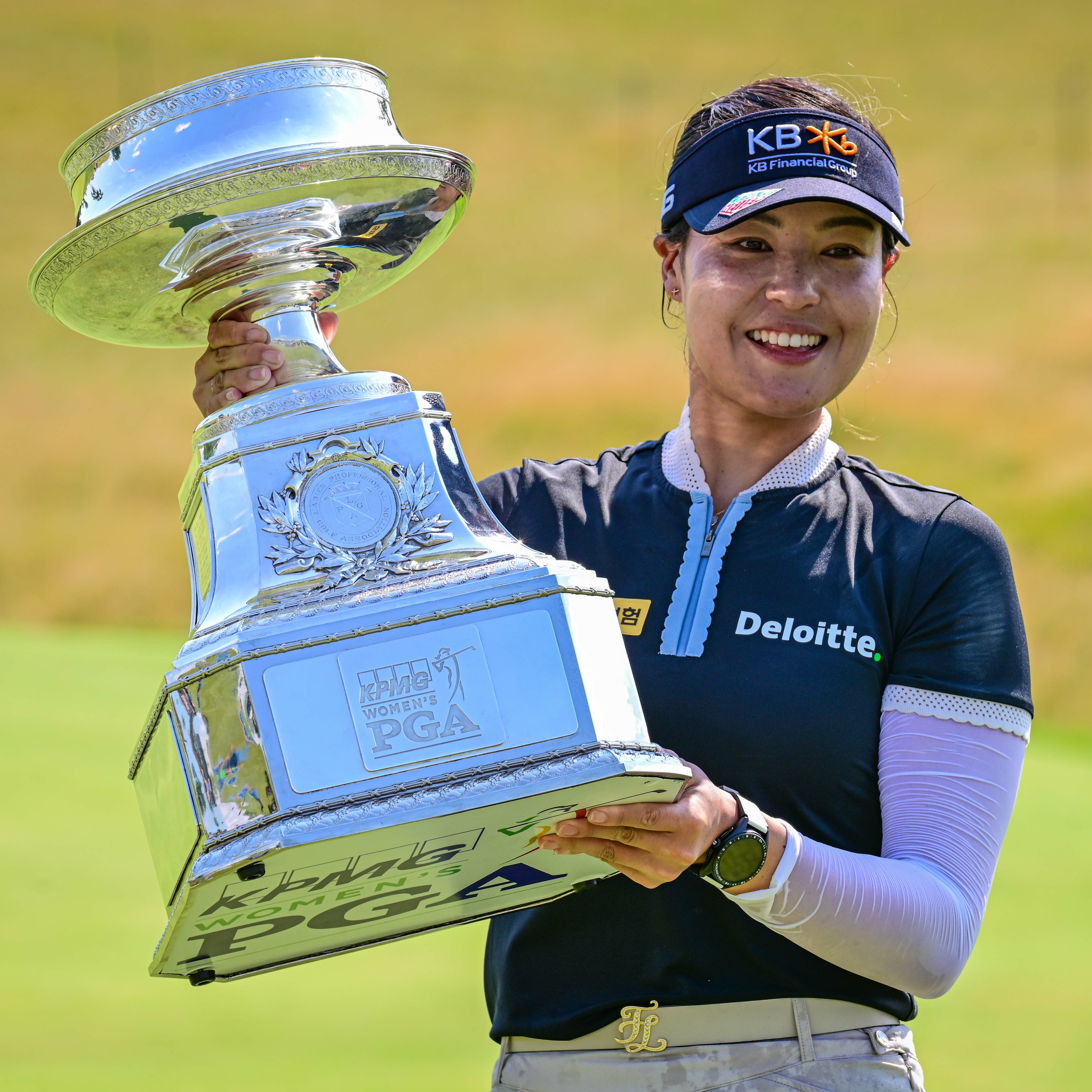
- Chun after winning the 2022 Women's PGA Championship

Personal information
- Nationality: South Korea
- Born: 10 August 1994 (age 32) Gunsan, South Korea
- Height: 5 ft 9 in (175 cm)

Career
- Sport: Golf
- College: Korea University
- Turned professional: 2012
- Current tour: LPGA Tour
- Former tour: LPGA of Korea Tour
- Professional wins: 15

Number of wins by tour
- LPGA Tour: 4
- Ladies European Tour: 1
- LPGA of Japan Tour: 2
- LPGA of Korea Tour: 10

Best results in LPGA major championships (wins: 3)
- Chevron Championship: T2: 2016
- Women's PGA C'ship: Won: 2022
- U.S. Women's Open: Won: 2015
- Women's British Open: 2nd: 2022
- Evian Championship: Won: 2016

Achievements and awards
- LPGA of Korea Tour leading money winner: 2015
- LPGA Vare Trophy: 2016
- LPGA Rookie of the Year: 2016

- Chun In-gee
- Hangul: 전인지
- RR: Jeon Inji
- MR: Chŏn Inji

Chun In-gee (Korean: 전인지, born 10 August 1994), also known as In Gee Chun, is a South Korean professional golfer. She was born in Gunsan, North Jeolla Province. She is a three-time major champion, having won the 2015 U.S. Women's Open, the 2016 Evian Championship with a score of 21 under par, which is the lowest winning score in a major tournament for either men or women, and the 2022 Women's PGA Championship.

== Career ==
In 2015, Chun became the first player in history to win majors on three different tours in the same calendar year. On the KLPGA Tour, she won two majors – the Hite Jinro Championship and the KB Financial Star Championship; on the JLPGA Tour, she also won two majors – the World Ladies Championship Salonpas Cup and the Japan Women's Open Golf Championship; and on the LPGA Tour, she won one major – the U.S. Women's Open. By winning the 2016 Evian Championship, she joined compatriot Se Ri Pak as the only two players in LPGA Tour history to win majors as their first two LPGA Tour titles. Chun represented the Republic of Korea (South Korea) at the 2016 Rio Olympics.

== Professional wins (15) ==
=== LPGA Tour wins (4) ===
Legend
Major championships (3)
Other LPGA Tour (1)

No.	Date	Tournament	Winning score	To par	Margin of victory	Runner(s)-up
1	12 Jul 2015	**U.S. Women's Open**	68-70-68-66=272	−8	1 stroke	(South Korea) Amy Yang
2	18 Sep 2016	**The Evian Championship**	63-66-65-69=263	−21	4 strokes	(South Korea) Ryu So-yeon (South Korea) Park Sung-hyun
3	14 Oct 2018	LPGA KEB Hana Bank Championship^{1}	70-70-66-66=272	−16	3 strokes	(England) Charley Hull
4	26 Jun 2022	**KPMG Women's PGA Championship**	64-69-75-75=283	−5	1 stroke	(Australia) Minjee Lee (United States) Lexi Thompson

^{1} Co-sanctioned with KLPGA Tour

LPGA Tour playoff record (0–4)

No.	Year	Tournament	Opponents	Result
1	2014	LPGA KEB-HanaBank Championship	(South Korea) Baek Kyu-jung (United States) Brittany Lincicome	Baek won with birdie on first extra hole
2	2017	Manulife LPGA Classic	(Thailand) Ariya Jutanugarn (United States) Lexi Thompson	Jutanugarn won with birdie on first extra hole
3	2018	Kingsmill Championship	(Japan) Nasa Hataoka (Thailand) Ariya Jutanugarn	Jutanugarn won with birdie on second extra hole Chun eliminated by birdie on first hole
4	2022	**Women's British Open**	(South Africa) Ashleigh Buhai	Buhai won with par on fourth extra hole

=== LPGA of Korea Tour wins (10) ===
No.	Date	Tournament	Winning score	To par	Margin of victory	Runner-up
1	23 Jun 2013	**Kia Motors Korea Women's Open**	68-69-70-68=275	−13	1 stroke	(South Korea) Park So-yeon
2	15 Jun 2014	S-Oil Champions Invitational	67-67-70=204	−12	3 strokes	(South Korea) Lee Ye-jeong (South Korea) Lee Min-young
3	28 Sep 2014	KDB Daewoo Securities Classic	66-69-69=204	−12	Playoff	(South Korea) Kim Ha-neul
4	16 Nov 2014	Chosun Ilbo-POSCO Championship	69-69-66=204	−12	1 stroke	(South Korea) Heo Yoon-kyung
5	19 Apr 2015	Samchully Together Open	70-69=139	−5	1 stroke	(South Korea) Ko Jin-young
6	24 May 2015	Doosan Match Play Championship	1 up			(South Korea) Ji Han-sol
7	14 Jun 2015	S-Oil Champions Invitational	68-71-69=208	−8	1 stroke	(South Korea) Kim Bo-kyung (South Korea) Heo Yoon-kyung
8	26 Jul 2015	**Hite Jinro Championship**	69-66-73=208	−8	3 strokes	(South Korea) Park Gyeol (South Korea) Cho Yoon-ji
9	25 Oct 2015	**KB Financial Star Championship**	69-69-67-69=274	−10	1 stroke	(South Korea) Inbee Park (South Korea) Hae Rym Kim
10	14 Oct 2018	LPGA KEB Hana Bank Championship^{1}	70-70-66-66=272	−16	3 strokes	(England) Charley Hull

Events in bold are KLPGA majors.
^{1} Co-sanctioned with LPGA Tour

=== LPGA of Japan Tour wins (2) ===
No.	Date	Tournament	Winning score	To par	Margin of victory	Runner-up
1	10 May 2015	**World Ladies Championship Salonpas Cup**	66-70-67-73=276	−12	4 strokes	(Japan) Momoko Ueda
2	4 Oct 2015	**Japan Women's Open Golf Championship**	71-73-71-71=286	−2	Playoff	(Japan) Erika Kikuchi (South Korea) Lee Mi-hyang

== Major championships ==
=== Wins (3) ===
Year	Championship	Winning score	Margin	Runner(s)-up	Winner's share ($)
2015	U.S. Women's Open	−8 (68-70-68-66=272)	1 stroke	(South Korea) Amy Yang	810,000
2016	The Evian Championship	−21 (63-66-65-69=263)	4 strokes	(South Korea) Ryu So-yeon, (South Korea) Park Sung-hyun	487,500
2022	Women's PGA Championship	−5 (64-69-75-75=283)	1 stroke	(Australia) Minjee Lee, (United States) Lexi Thompson	1,350,000

=== Results timeline ===
Results not in chronological order.

Tournament	2014	2015	2016	2017	2018	2019	2020
Chevron Championship		T41	T2	T14	T30	CUT	T18
Women's PGA Championship			T30	T54	CUT	T30	T23
U.S. Women's Open		1	CUT	T15	T41	CUT	CUT
The Evian Championship	T65	CUT	1	T18	T16	T49	NT
Women's British Open		T31	T8	T43	T28	T35	T7

Tournament	2021	2022	2023	2024	2025	2026
Chevron Championship	CUT	T25	T18	CUT	T18	CUT
U.S. Women's Open	T41	T15	T27	CUT	54	4
Women's PGA Championship	T27	1	T24		T31	T24
The Evian Championship	T6	T22	T36		CUT	
Women's British Open	CUT	2	T40		39	CUT

Win
Top 10
Did not play

CUT = missed the half-way cut
NT = no tournament
T = tied

=== Summary ===
Tournament	Wins	2nd	3rd	Top-5	Top-10	Top-25	Events	Cuts made
Chevron Championship	0	1	0	1	1	6	12	8
U.S. Women's Open	1	0	0	2	2	4	12	8
Women's PGA Championship	1	0	0	1	1	4	10	9
The Evian Championship	1	0	0	1	2	5	10	8
Women's British Open	0	1	0	1	3	3	11	9
Totals	3	2	0	6	9	22	55	42

- Most consecutive cuts made – 10 (2022 Chevron – 2023 Women's British)
- Longest streak of top 10s – 2 (2016 British Open – 2016 Evian Championship)

== LPGA Tour career summary ==
Year	Tournaments played	Cuts made*	Wins	2nd	3rd	Top 10s	Best finish	Earnings ($)	Money list rank	Scoring average	Scoring rank
2013	1	1	0	0	0	0	T28	n/a	n/a	72.00	n/a
2014	2	2	0	1	0	1	T2	n/a	n/a	71.63	n/a
2015	8	7	1	0	0	1	1	n/a	n/a	71.23	n/a
2016	19	18	1	3	3	11	1	1,501,102	4	69.58	1
2017	23	21	0	5	2	10	2	1,250,259	11	69.41	3
2018	20	18	1	1	0	4	1	741,691	26	70.20	12
2019	23	18	0	0	0	2	T4	270,213	67	71.17	45
2020	15	13	0	0	0	2	T7	301,686	37	71.37	32
2021	23	18	0	0	1	8	T3	754,538	25	69.63	7
2022	18	17	1	2	0	3	1	2,673,860	3	70.20	19
2023	19	15	0	0	0	1	T8	491,488	58	70.96	45
2024	11	6	0	0	0	0	T14	85,268	141	72.72	140
2025	18	13	0	0	0	0	T18	361,313	75	71.92	100
Totals^	199	166	4	12	6	43	1	8,431,418	41		

^ Official as of 2025 season
* Includes matchplay and other tournaments without a cut.

== World ranking ==
Position in Women's World Golf Rankings at the end of each calendar year.

Year	Ranking	Source
2013	43	
2014	19	
2015	10	
2016	3	
2017	5	
2018	16	
2019	48	
2020	62	
2021	35	
2022	8	
2023	37	
2024	170	
2025	146	

== Team appearances ==
Professional

- The Queens (representing Korea): 2015
- International Crown (representing South Korea): 2016, 2018 (winners), 2023
