= Su-Hyun Oh =

South Korean-born Australian golfer (born 1996)

Personal information
- Nationality: Australia
- Born: 23 May 1996 (age 30) Busan, South Korea
- Height: 5 ft 6 in (168 cm)
- Life partner: Kenny Davis

Career
- Sport: Golf
- Turned professional: 2014
- Current tours: WPGA Tour of Australasia; Epson Tour
- Former tours: LPGA Tour; Ladies European Tour
- Professional wins: 3

Number of wins by tour
- Ladies European Tour: 1
- WPGA Tour of Australasia: 3

Best results in LPGA major championships
- Chevron Championship: T51: 2014
- Women's PGA C'ship: T8: 2016
- U.S. Women's Open: T17: 2018
- Women's British Open: T15: 2018
- Evian Championship: T14: 2017

Su-Hyun Oh (born 23 May 1996) is a South Korea-born Australian professional golfer and LPGA Tour player. She became number one in the World Amateur Golf Ranking in 2013 and represented Australia at the 2016 Summer Olympics.

== Early life and amateur career ==
Born in Busan, South Korea, Oh moved to Australia at the age of eight and has played golf since the age of nine.

In 2009, at 12, she was the youngest player to ever qualify for the Women's Australian Open. She finished tied for second at the 2013 Australian Ladies Masters, a tournament on the ALPG Tour and Ladies European Tour.

Oh was a member of the Australian National Team and won the 2014 Espirito Santo Trophy at the World Amateur Team Championship in Japan with Shelly Shin and Minjee Lee.

== Professional career ==
Oh turned professional in the fall of 2014. She finished second in her professional debut at the 2015 Oates Victorian Open, then a week later won her second start as a professional, the 2015 Volvik RACV Ladies Masters in Australia. The win earned her a two-year exemption on the Ladies European Tour.

Oh made it to the final stage of the 2014 LPGA Qualifying School, but failed to earn a full LPGA Tour card, leaving her with eligibility on the developmental Symetra Tour. She joined the LPGA Tour in 2016, and over the next eight seasons recorded runner-up finishes at the 2016 Kingsmill Championship, the 2019 ISPS Handa Vic Open, the 2019 Meijer LPGA Classic, and the 2021 Cambia Portland Classic. In 2019, she finished a career-high 33rd in the season rankings.

After a tie for 8th at the 2016 KPMG Women's PGA Championship she rose to a career-high 40th in the Women's World Golf Rankings, which helped her qualify for the 2016 Summer Olympics alongside Minjee Lee.

In 2022, Oh won the Australian WPGA Championship by 4 strokes at Royal Queensland Golf Club, and in 2025 she won the Women's Victorian Open at 13th Beach Golf Links.

== Amateur wins ==
- 2010 Victorian Girls Championship
- 2011 Aaron Baddeley International Junior, GNJGF Junior Masters
- 2012 Australian Girls' Amateur, Srixon International Junior Girls Classic, Dunes Medal, Port Phillip Open Amateur & Victorian Women's Amateur Championship
- 2013 Lake Macquarie Amateur, Port Phillip Open & Victorian Women's Amateur Championship
- 2014 WA 72 Hole Stroke Play

== Professional wins (3) ==
=== Ladies European Tour wins (1) ===
| No. | Date | Tournament | Winning score | To par | Margin of victory | Runners-up |
|---|---|---|---|---|---|---|
| 1 | 15 Feb 2015 | Volvik RACV Ladies Masters^{1} | 69-75-72-69=285 | −7 | 3 strokes | (England) Charley Hull, (Australia) Katherine Kirk, (England) Florentyna Parker |

^{1} Co-sanctioned by the ALPG Tour

=== WPGA Tour of Australasia wins (3) ===
| No. | Date | Tournament | Winning score | To par | Margin of victory | Runner(s)-up |
|---|---|---|---|---|---|---|
| 1 | 15 Feb 2015 | Volvik RACV Ladies Masters^{1} | 69-75-72-69=285 | −7 | 3 strokes | (England) Charley Hull, (Australia) Katherine Kirk, (England) Florentyna Parker |
| 2 | 16 Jan 2022 | Australian WPGA Championship | 66-72-68-68=274 | −10 | 4 strokes | (Australia) Grace Kim |
| 3 | 9 Feb 2025 | Vic Open | 70-76-69-74=289 | E | 1 stroke | (Japan) Shina Kanazawa |

^{1} Co-sanctioned by the Ladies European Tour

== Results in LPGA majors ==
Results not in chronological order.

| Tournament | 2014 | 2015 | 2016 | 2017 | 2018 | 2019 | 2020 | 2021 | 2022 | 2023 |
|---|---|---|---|---|---|---|---|---|---|---|
| Chevron Championship | T51 | | | T56 | CUT | CUT | CUT | CUT | CUT | |
| Women's PGA Championship | | | T8 | T46 | CUT | T53 | CUT | 63 | CUT | CUT |
| U.S. Women's Open | | CUT | CUT | T56 | T17 | CUT | 66 | | | |
| The Evian Championship | | CUT | T61 | T14 | WD | T44 | NT | CUT | CUT | |
| Women's British Open | CUT | T71 | T70 | T30 | T15 | T21 | CUT | T34 | CUT | |

Top 10
Did not play

CUT = missed the half-way cut
WD = withdrew
NT = no tournament
T = tied

== Team appearances ==
Amateur

- Espirito Santo Trophy (representing Australia): 2014 (winners)
- Queen Sirikit Cup (representing Australia): 2012, 2013 (winners)

Professional

- International Crown (representing Australia): 2016, 2018
- The Queens (representing Australia): 2016
