= Haru Nomura =

Japanese professional golfer (born 1992)

Personal information
- Full name: Harukyo Nomura (Japanese name); Moon Min-kyung (Korean name)
- Nationality: Japan
- Born: 25 November 1992 (age 33) Yokohama, Japan
- Height: 5 ft 5 in (1.65 m)

Career
- Sport: Golf
- Turned professional: 2010
- Former tour: LPGA Tour
- Professional wins: 6

Number of wins by tour
- LPGA Tour: 3
- Ladies European Tour: 1
- LPGA of Japan Tour: 1
- LPGA of Korea Tour: 1
- WPGA Tour of Australasia: 1
- Epson Tour: 1

Best results in LPGA major championships (wins: 1)
- Chevron Championship: T26: 2016
- Women's PGA C'ship: T36: 2012, 2017
- U.S. Women's Open: T11: 2016
- Women's British Open: T17: 2016
- Evian Championship: 8th: 2016

Harukyo Nomura (Japanese: 野村敏京; Korean: 문민경; born 25 November 1992) is a Japanese professional golfer.

Having a Korean mother and Japanese father, Nomura moved to South Korea at the age of five and lived in Seoul until she graduated from Myongji High School. In 2011, she selected Japanese nationality.

== Career ==
Nomura started to play golf at age of 11, and in 2007 she won the Japan Junior Golf Championship for girls 12–14 years of age. Nomura was the low amateur at the 2009 Japan Women's Open. She turned pro in December 2010 after qualifying for the LPGA Tour on her first attempt, finishing tied for 39th at the LPGA Final Qualifying Tournament to earn Priority List Category 20 for the 2011 season. She qualified for the 2011 U.S. Women's Open through one of the sectional qualifying tournaments. Her first professional victory came on the LPGA Futures Tour in April 2011 at the Daytona Beach Invitational. She followed this with a win on the LPGA of Japan Tour in May 2011 and her third victory came on the LPGA of Korea Tour in 2015. In 2013 she was runner-up at the Mizuno Classic on the LPGA Tour.

On 21 February 2016, Nomura held off world number one Lydia Ko to win her first LPGA tournament, the ISPS Handa Women's Australian Open, the first Japanese victory on the LPGA Tour since Mika Miyazato won the Safeway Classic in 2012. With the victory, Nomura moved from 67th to 50th in the Women's World Golf Rankings and into second on the 2016 LPGA Tour Money List.

== Professional wins (6) ==
=== LPGA Tour (3) ===
No.	Date	Tournament	Winning score	To par	Margin of victory	Runner-up
1	20 Feb 2016	ISPS Handa Women's Australian Open^{[1]}	69-68-70-65=272	−16	3 strokes	(New Zealand) Lydia Ko
2	24 Apr 2016	Swinging Skirts LPGA Classic	65-70-71-73=279	−9	4 strokes	(South Africa) Lee-Anne Pace
3	30 Apr 2017	Volunteers of America Texas Shootout	68-65-72-76=281	−3	Playoff	(United States) Cristie Kerr

^{1} Co-sanctioned by the Ladies European Tour and the ALPG Tour.

LPGA Tour playoff record (1–0)

No.	Year	Tournament	Opponent	Result
1	2017	Volunteers of America Texas Shootout	(United States) Cristie Kerr	Won with birdie on sixth extra hole

=== LPGA of Japan Tour (1) ===
No.	Date	Tournament	Winning score	To par	Margin of victory	Runner-up
1	22 May 2011	Chukyo TV Bridgestone Ladies Open	66-69-68=203	−13	3 strokes	(Japan) Kaori Aoyama

=== LPGA of Korea Tour (1) ===
No.	Date	Tournament	Winning score	To par	Margin of victory	Runner-up
1	6 Sep 2015	Hanwha Finance Classic	73-65-74-75=287	−1	Playoff	(South Korea) Bae Seon-woo

=== LPGA Futures Tour (1) ===
- 2011 Daytona Beach Invitational

== Results in LPGA majors ==
Results not in chronological order.

Tournament	2011	2012	2013	2014	2015	2016	2017	2018	2019	2020
ANA Inspiration				T64	CUT	T26	T70	CUT	CUT	CUT
Women's PGA Championship	CUT	T36		T48	T53	63	T36	CUT	WD	73
U.S. Women's Open	T64	CUT			CUT	T11	T33	CUT		
The Evian Championship ^				CUT	T34	8	T32			NT
Women's British Open				T45	CUT	T17	T69			T22

Tournament	2021	2022	2023
ANA Inspiration	CUT		
Women's PGA Championship			CUT
U.S. Women's Open			T64
The Evian Championship ^			
Women's British Open			

^ The Evian Championship was added as a major in 2013.

Top 10
Did not play

CUT = missed the half-way cut
WD = withdrew
NT = no tournament
T = tied

=== Summary ===
Tournament	Wins	2nd	3rd	Top-5	Top-10	Top-25	Events	Cuts made
ANA Inspiration	0	0	0	0	0	0	8	3
Women's PGA Championship	0	0	0	0	0	0	10	6
U.S. Women's Open	0	0	0	0	0	1	7	4
The Evian Championship	0	0	0	0	1	1	4	3
Women's British Open	0	0	0	0	0	2	5	4
Totals	0	0	0	0	1	4	34	20

- Most consecutive cuts made – 11 (2015 Evian – 2017 Evian)
- Longest streak of top-10s – 1

== Team appearances ==
Professional

- International Crown (representing Japan): 2016
