= Baek Kyu-jung =

South Korean professional golfer (born 1995)

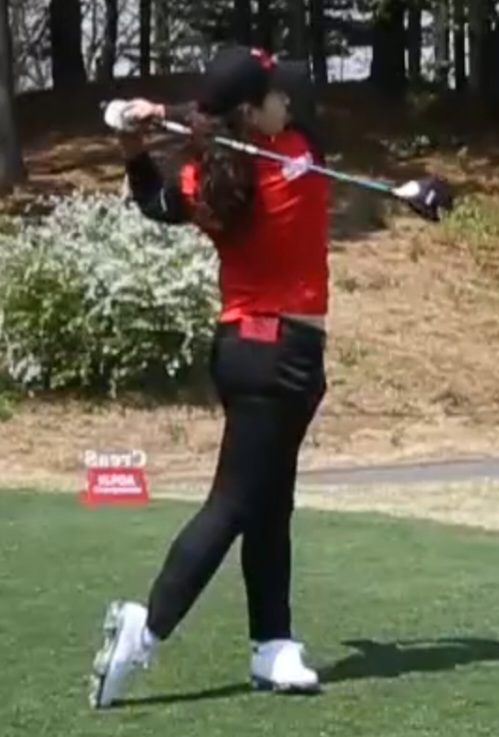

Personal information
- Nationality: South Korea
- Born: 15 October 1995 (age 31) Gumi, Gyeongsangbuk-do, South Korea
- Height: 1.75 m (5 ft 9 in)

Career
- Sport: Golf
- Turned professional: 2012
- Former tours: LPGA of Korea Tour; LPGA Tour
- Professional wins: 4

Number of wins by tour
- LPGA Tour: 1
- LPGA of Korea Tour: 4

Best results in LPGA major championships
- Chevron Championship: T35: 2015
- Women's PGA C'ship: T32: 2015
- U.S. Women's Open: T32: 2015
- Women's British Open: T47: 2015
- Evian Championship: T59: 2015

Baek Kyu-jung (born 15 October 1995), also known as Q Baek, is a South Korean professional golfer.

== Career ==
As an amateur, Baek played on the winning South Korean team in the Espirito Santo Trophy in 2012 alongside Kim Hyo-joo and Kim Min-sun.

Baek turned professional on 16 October 2012 and plays on the LPGA of Korea Tour (KLPGA). She won four events in her rookie year (2014). One of the events was the LPGA KEB-HanaBank Championship, a tournament co-sanctioned by the LPGA Tour. She later accepted membership on the LPGA Tour for 2015.

== Professional wins (4) ==
=== LPGA of Korea Tour wins (4) ===
No.	Date	Tournament	Winning score	To par	Margin of victory	Runner(s)-up
1	27 Apr 2014	Nexen Saint Nine Masters	67-71-69=207	−9	2 strokes	(South Korea) Jang Ha-na
2	8 Jun 2014	Lotte Cantata Women's Open	64-65-69=198	−18	2 strokes	(South Korea) Jang Ha-na
3	21 Sep 2014	**MefLife KLPGA Championship by Hankyung**	68-70-73-67=278	−10	Playoff	(South Korea) Hong Ran
4	19 Oct 2014	LPGA KEB–Hana Bank Championship^{1}	74-69-68-67=278	−10	Playoff	(South Korea) Chun In-gee (United States) Brittany Lincicome

Events in bold are KLPGA majors.
^{1} Co-sanctioned with LPGA Tour

=== LPGA Tour wins (1) ===
No.	Date	Tournament	Winning score	To par	Margin of victory	Runners-up
1	19 Oct 2014	LPGA KEB–Hana Bank Championship^{1}	74-69-68-67=278	−10	Playoff	(South Korea) Chun In-gee (United States) Brittany Lincicome

^{1} Co-sanctioned with KLPGA Tour

LPGA Tour playoff record (1–0)

No.	Year	Tournament	Opponents	Result
1	2014	LPGA KEB–Hana Bank Championship	(South Korea) Chun In-gee (United States) Brittany Lincicome	Won with birdie on first extra hole

== Results in LPGA majors ==
Tournament	2015	2016	2017
ANA Inspiration	T35	T50	CUT
Women's PGA Championship	T32	T43	
U.S. Women's Open	T32	T59	
Women's British Open	T47	CUT	
The Evian Championship	T59	CUT	

Did not play

CUT = missed the half-way cut
T = tied

== Team appearances ==
Amateur

- Espirito Santo Trophy (representing South Korea): 2012 (winners)
