= Kim Hye-youn =

South Korean basketball player

Personal information
- Nationality: South Korean
- Born: 3 June 1960 (age 65)

Sport
- Sport: Basketball

Korean name
- Hangul: 김혜연
- Hanja: 金惠蓮
- RR: Gim Hyeyeon
- MR: Kim Hyeyŏn

Kim Hye-youn (born 3 June 1960) is a South Korean basketball player. She competed in the women's tournament at the 1988 Summer Olympics.
