= International Crown =

Women's professional team golf tournament

Coordinates: 51.7411°N 0.4054°W

Tournament information
- Location: Varies; 2027 – San Francisco, United States
- Established: 2014
- Course: Lake Merced Golf Club – (2027)
- Tour: LPGA Tour
- Format: Match play, team event 32 players (4 each on 8 teams)
- Prize fund: $2.0 million
- Month played: October

Current champion
- Australia

Final champion
- 2025 International Crown

The Hanwha LifePlus International Crown is a biennial women's professional team golf tournament on the LPGA Tour. Eight national teams of four players each (32 players in total) participate in the match play event. Beginning in 2025, the field will consist of seven national teams of four players each, and one team of players representing other countries not qualified (one player each from the Americas, Europe/Middle East, Asia, and Africa/Oceania regional).

== History ==
It debuted in 2014 at Caves Valley Golf Club in Owings Mills, Maryland, a suburb northwest of Baltimore. With selection based on the world rankings of individuals, the eight nations were announced the previous November: Australia, Chinese Taipei, Japan, South Korea, Spain, Sweden, Thailand, and the United States. Teams were divided into two pools and played round robin fourball for three days. The top five teams (20 players) advanced to the ten singles matches on Sunday, with each nation facing the other four. Spain won all four singles matches to win the title with a total of fifteen points; Sweden split its matches to finish in second with eleven points.

The second edition in 2016 took place at the Merit Club in Gurnee, Illinois, north of Chicago. The top two finishers from 2014, champion Spain and runner-up Sweden, did not qualify for 2016 and were replaced by China and England. The United States won the 2016 International Crown with 13 points, winning three out of four singles matches on Sunday with South Korea finishing second with 12 points.

The third, 2018, edition was played 4–7 Oct at the Jack Nicklaus Golf Club Korea in Incheon, South Korea. The eight countries participating were South Korea, United States, Japan, England, Australia, Thailand, Sweden, and Chinese Taipei. This field was the same as 2016, with the exception of Sweden replacing China. The team members were finalized on 2 July 2018.

The 2020 event, scheduled for 27–30 August at the Centurion Club in St Albans, England, was canceled due to the COVID-19 pandemic.

In October 2022, the LPGA announced the return of the event for the 2023 season with a new name and title sponsor, the Hanwha LifePlus International Crown. It will be held at TPC Harding Park in San Francisco, California from 4–7 May 2023.

On January 16, 2025, the LPGA announced for the 2025 edition that a World team will be featured, marking the inclusion of players who would not otherwise qualify for the competition via country selection. The World team will include the top-ranked player from each of the following four regions, not from a country already qualified: Americas (North America and South America); Europe; Asia; and Africa and Oceania. The World team will compete alongside teams representing seven countries. The 2025 edition will be held 23–26 October at New Korea Country Club in Goyang, South Korea.

== Sponsorship and future sites ==
UL, an American safety organization historically known as Underwriters Laboratories, was announced as the title sponsor for 2016 and 2018.

Hanwha Group, a large South Korean business conglomerate, was announced as the title sponsor for the 2023 event.

== Winners ==
Year	Dates	Champion	Points	Runner-up	Points	Venue	Host country	Purse ($)	Winner's share ($)
2027	TBA		(––)		(––)	Lake Merced Golf Club	United States		
2025	23–26 Oct	Australia	2.5	United States	0.5	New Korea CC	South Korea	2,000,000	500,000 (team)
2023	4–7 May	Thailand	11 (11–1–0)	Australia	6.5 (6–5–1)	TPC Harding Park	United States	2,000,000	500,000 (team)
2020	27–30 Aug	Canceled				Centurion Club	England	1,600,000	400,000 (team)
2018	4–7 Oct	South Korea	15 (7–2–1)	United States; England	11 (5–4–1); 11 (5–4–1)	Jack Nicklaus Golf Club Korea	South Korea	1,600,000	400,000 (team)
2016	21–24 Jul	United States	13 (6–3–1)	South Korea	12 (6–4–0)	Merit Club	United States	1,600,000	400,000 (team)
2014	24–27 Jul	Spain	15 (7–2–1)	Sweden	11 (5–4–1)	Caves Valley Golf Club	United States	1,600,000	400,000 (team)

== Results table ==
Country	Times played	Best finish	Players	2014	2016	2018	2023	2025
Australia	5	1	11	8	8	6	2	1
China	3	T5	9	–	6	–	T5	T7
Chinese Taipei	3	T3	6	7	T3	8	–	–
England	3	T2	8	–	T3	T2	7	–
Japan	5	T3	17	T3	4	7	8	4
South Korea	5	1	12	T3	2	1	T5	T5
Spain	1	1	4	1	–	–	–	–
Sweden	4	2	8	2	–	5	4	T5
Thailand	5	1	11	5	7	4	1	T7
United States	5	1	13	6	1	T2	3	2
World team	1	3	4	–	–	–	–	3
