= LPGA KEB Hana Bank Championship =

South Korean golf tournament (2002–2018)

Coordinates: 37.484°N 126.469°E

LPGA KEB HanaBank Championship

Tournament information
- Location: Incheon, South Korea
- Established: 2002
- Courses: Sky 72 Golf Club, Ocean Course
- Par: 72
- Length: 6,316 yards (5,775 m)
- Tours: LPGA Tour; LPGA of Korea Tour
- Format: Stroke play - 72 holes, no cut
- Prize fund: $2.0 million
- Month played: October
- Final year: 2018

Tournament record score
- Aggregate: 269 Ko Jin-young (2017); 72-hole record 200 Grace Park (2004); 54-hole record
- To par: −19 Ko Jin-young (2017); 72-hole record −16 Grace Park (2004); 54-hole record

Final champion
- (South Korea) Chun In-gee

Location in South Korea

The LPGA KEB HanaBank Championship was a women's professional golf tournament in Incheon, South Korea, co-sanctioned by the LPGA of Korea Tour and the LPGA Tour.

Until 2013, it was a 54-hole event with a limited field of 78 players, approximately half of a full-field event. There was no cut; all players played all three rounds. However, the LPGA Tour imposed a points cut to the top 40 players (and ties) for purposes of championship points towards the CME Globe. In 2014, the event became a 72-hole event, and again only has a symbolic cut of 40 players at the end of the tournament for CME Globe purposes.

== Tournament names ==
- 2001–2002: Sports Today CJ Nine Bridges Classic
- 2003–2005: CJ Nine Bridges Classic presented by Sports Today
- 2006: KOLON-Hana Bank Championship
- 2007–2009: Hana Bank-KOLON Championship
- 2010–2011: LPGA Hana Bank Championship Presented by SK Telecom
- 2012–2014: LPGA KEB-HanaBank Championship
- 2015–2018: LPGA KEB Hana Bank Championship

== Winners ==
Year	Dates	Champion	Country	Score	To par	Tournament location	Purse ($)	Winner's share ($)
2018	11–14 Oct	Chun In-gee	South Korea	272	−16	Sky 72 Golf Club, Ocean Course	2,000,000	300,000
2017	12–15 Oct	Ko Jin-young	South Korea	269	−19	Sky 72 Golf Club, Ocean Course	2,000,000	300,000
2016	13–16 Oct	Carlota Ciganda	Spain	278**	−10	Sky 72 Golf Club, Ocean Course	2,000,000	300,000
2015	15–18 Oct	Lexi Thompson	United States	273	−15	Sky 72 Golf Club, Ocean Course	2,000,000	300,000
2014	16–19 Oct	Baek Kyu-jung	South Korea	278**	−10	Sky 72 Golf Club, Ocean Course	2,000,000	300,000
2013	18–20 Oct	Amy Yang	South Korea	207**	−9	Sky 72 Golf Club, Ocean Course	1,900,000	285,000
2012	19–21 Oct	Suzann Pettersen	Norway	204**	−11	Sky 72 Golf Club, Ocean Course	1,800,000	270,000
2011	7–9 Oct	Yani Tseng	Taiwan	202	−14	Sky 72 Golf Club, Ocean Course	1,800,000	270,000
2010	29–31 Oct	Na Yeon Choi	South Korea	206	−10	Sky 72 Golf Club, Ocean Course	1,800,000	270,000
2009	30 Oct – 1 Nov	Na Yeon Choi	South Korea	206	−10	Sky 72 Golf Club, Ocean Course	1,700,000	255,000
2008	31 Oct – 2 Nov	Candie Kung	United States	210	−6	Sky 72 Golf Club, Ocean Course	1,600,000	240,000
2007	19–21 Oct	Suzann Pettersen	Norway	141*	−3	Mauna Ocean Golf & Resort	1,500,000	225,000
2006	27–29 Oct	Jin Joo Hong	South Korea	205	−11	Mauna Ocean Golf & Resort	1,350,000	202,500
2005	28–30 Oct	Jee Young Lee	South Korea	211	−5	Nine Bridges Golf Club	1,350,000	202,500
2004	29–31 Oct	Grace Park	South Korea	200	−16	Nine Bridges Golf Club	1,350,000	202,500
2003	31 Oct – 2 Nov	Shi Hyun Ahn	South Korea	204	−12	Nine Bridges Golf Club	1,250,000	187,500
2002	25–27 Oct	Se Ri Pak	South Korea	213	−3	Nine Bridges Golf Club	1,500,000	225,000
2001	Tournament canceled due to events of September 11							

*Tournament was shortened to 36 holes in 2007 due to unplayable course conditions.
**Tournament went to a playoff.

== Tournament record ==
Year	Player	Score	Round	Course
2003	Grace Park	62 (−10)	3rd	Nine Bridges Golf Club
2006	Joo Mi Kim	66 (−6)	1st	Mauna Ocean Golf & Resort
2015	Park Sung-hyun	62 (−10)	1st	Sky 72 Golf Club, Ocean Course
2015	Amy Yang	62 (−10)	4th	Sky 72 Golf Club, Ocean Course
