= 2017 Women's PGA Championship =

Tournament information
- Dates: June 29 – July 2, 2017
- Location: Olympia Fields, Illinois; 41.521°N 87.687°W
- Courses: Olympia Fields Country Club; North Course
- Organized by: PGA of America
- Tour: LPGA Tour
- Format: Stroke play - 72 holes

Statistics
- Par: 71
- Length: 6,588 yards (6,024 m)
- Field: 156 players, 74 after cut
- Cut: 144 (+2)
- Prize fund: $3.5 million
- Winner's share: $525,000

Champion
- (United States) Danielle Kang
- 271 (−13)
- Location in the United States Location in Washington

The 2017 KPMG Women's PGA Championship was the 63rd Women's PGA Championship, played June 29 – July 2 at Olympia Fields Country Club in Olympia Fields, Illinois, a suburb south of Chicago. Known as the LPGA Championship through 2014, it was the second of five major championships on the LPGA Tour during the 2017 season.

Danielle Kang won the championship for her first professional win, one stroke ahead of defending champion Brooke Henderson.

Olympia Fields hosted the PGA Championship in 1925 and 1961, and the U.S. Open in 1928 and 2003. It has also been the site of the U.S. Senior Open (1997) and the U.S. Amateur (2015).

Golf Channel and NBC Sports televised the Women's PGA for the third consecutive year.

== Field ==
The field included 156 players who meet one or more of the selection criteria and commit to participate by a designated deadline.

=== Qualified players ===
Players who qualified for the Championship are listed below. Players are listed under the first category in which they qualified; additional qualifying categories are shown in parentheses. Players were eligible based on the following criteria:

1. Active LPGA Hall of Fame members

Karrie Webb (2,12)

- Juli Inkster (2,12) did not play

2. Past winners of the Women's PGA Championship

Laura Davies, Shanshan Feng (4,6,12), Brooke Henderson (4,5,6,12), Cristie Kerr (4,6,10,12), Anna Nordqvist (4,5,6,10,12), Inbee Park (3,4,6,7,12), Suzann Pettersen (3,4,6,10,12), Yani Tseng

- Pak Se-ri did not play

3. Professionals who have won an LPGA major championship in the previous five years and during the current year

Choi Na-yeon (4,12), Chun In-gee (4,6,12), Ariya Jutanugarn (4,5,6,12), Kim Hyo-joo (4,12), Lydia Ko (4,5,6,12), Brittany Lang (4,6,10,12), Stacy Lewis (6,10,12), Brittany Lincicome (4,10,12), Mo Martin (12), Ryu So-yeon (4,5,6,12), Jiyai Shin (6), Lexi Thompson (4,6,10,12), Michelle Wie (10,12), Yoo Sun-young (12)

4. Professionals who have won an official LPGA tournament in the previous two calendar years and during the current year

Chella Choi (5,12), Carlota Ciganda (6,10,12), Charley Hull (6,10,12), In-Kyung Kim (6,12), Kim Sei-young (6,12), Jessica Korda (6,12), Minjee Lee (6,12), Mirim Lee (5,6,12), Caroline Masson (10,12), Haru Nomura (6,12), Jenny Shin (12), Kris Tamulis (12), Amy Yang (5,6,12)

- Ahn Sun-ju and Jang Ha-na (12) did not play

5. Professionals who finished top-10 and ties at the previous year's Women's PGA Championship

Su-Hyun Oh (12), Park Hee-young (12)

6. Professionals ranked No. 1-30 on the Women's World Golf Rankings as of June 5, 2017

M. J. Hur (12), Park Sung-hyun (12), Gerina Piller (10,12)

- Kim Ha-neul, Lee Bo-mee, and Teresa Lu did not play

7. Gold Medal winner at the 2016 Rio Olympics

8. The top eight finishers at the 2016 LPGA T&CP National Championship

Jean Bartholomew, Jessica Carafiello, Wendy Doolan, Lisa Grimes, Amanda McCurdy, Karen Paolozzi, Hillery Sence, Kristin Walla

9. The top finisher (not otherwise qualified via the 2016 LPGA T&CP National Championship) at the 2017 PGA Women's Stroke Play Championship

Alison Curdt

10. Members of the European and United States Solheim Cup teams in 2015

Paula Creamer (12), Sandra Gal (12), Caroline Hedwall (12), Karine Icher (12), Alison Lee (12), Catriona Matthew (12), Azahara Muñoz (12), Gwladys Nocera, Morgan Pressel (12), Melissa Reid (12), Lizette Salas (12), Angela Stanford (12)

11. Maximum of two sponsor invites

Georgia Hall, Klára Spilková

12. LPGA members who have committed to the event, ranked in the order of their position on the 2017 official money list through the conclusion of the Walmart NW Arkansas Championship

Marina Alex, Beth Allen, Brittany Altomare, Aditi Ashok, Laetitia Beck, Nicole Broch Larsen, Ashleigh Buhai, Katie Burnett, Dori Carter, Sandra Changkija, Pei-Yun Chien, Karen Chung, Cydney Clanton, Holly Clyburn, Jacqui Concolino, Perrine Delacour, Lindy Duncan, Austin Ernst, Jodi Ewart Shadoff, Simin Feng, Laura Gonzalez Escallon, Jaye Marie Green, Mina Harigae, Nasa Hataoka, Céline Herbin, Dani Holmqvist, Wei-Ling Hsu, Vicky Hurst, Eun-Hee Ji, Tiffany Joh, Moriya Jutanugarn, Danielle Kang, Haeji Kang, Kim Kaufman, Megan Khang, Christina Kim, Katherine Kirk, Joanna Klatten, Nelly Korda, Olafia Kristinsdottir, Candie Kung, Min Seo Kwak, Bronte Law, Ilhee Lee, Lee Jeong-eun, Lee Mi-hyang, Min Lee, Amelia Lewis, Lin Xiyu, Pernilla Lindberg, Gaby López, Lee Lopez, Ally McDonald, Stephanie Meadow, Wichanee Meechai, Ai Miyazato, Giulia Molinaro, Becky Morgan, Belen Mozo, Therese O'Hara, Amy Olson, Ryann O'Toole, Lee-Anne Pace, Brooke Pancake, Annie Park, Jane Park, Sadena Parks, Emily Kristine Pedersen, Katherine Perry, Pornanong Phatlum, Beatriz Recari, Paula Reto, Demi Runas, Madelene Sagström, Sherman Santiwiwatthanaphong, Alena Sharp, Kelly Shon, Sarah Jane Smith, Jennifer Song, Nontaya Srisawang, Marissa Steen, Jackie Stoelting, Thidapa Suwannapura, Kelly Tan, Pannarat Thanapolboonyaras, Ayako Uehara, Mariajo Uribe, Cheyenne Woods, Jing Yan, Angel Yin, Sakura Yokomine, Pavarisa Yoktuan

- Maude-Aimee Leblanc and Mika Miyazato did not play

13. The remainder of the field will be filled by members who have committed to the event, ranked in the order of their position on the 2017 LPGA Priority List as of the commitment deadline

== Round summaries ==
=== First round ===
Thursday, June 29, 2017
Friday, June 30, 2017

Place	Player	Score	To par
1	(South Korea) Amy Yang	65	−6
2	(South Korea) Chella Choi	66	−5
3	(United States) Brittany Altomare	67	−4
T4	(Canada) Brooke Henderson	68	−3
T4	(United States) Kim Kaufman	68	−3
T4	(United States) Alison Lee	68	−3
T4	(Mexico) Gaby López	68	−3
T4	(Australia) Su-Hyun Oh	68	−3
T4	(Denmark) Emily Kristine Pedersen	68	−3
T4	(United States) Michelle Wie	68	−3

=== Second round ===
Friday, June 30, 2017

Place	Player	Score	To par
T1	(United States) Danielle Kang	69-66=135	−7
T1	(South Korea) Kim Sei-young	69-66=135	−7
T3	(South Korea) Chella Choi	66-70=136	−6
T3	(England) Jodi Ewart Shadoff	70-66=136	−6
T3	(South Korea) Lee Mi-hyang	69-67=136	−6
T3	(United States) Brittany Lincicome	70-66=136	−6
T3	(South Korea) Amy Yang	65-71=136	−6
T8	(Canada) Brooke Henderson	68-69=137	−5
T8	(Thailand) Moriya Jutanugarn	69-68=137	−5
T8	(South Korea) Ryu So-yeon	69-68=137	−5
T8	(Australia) Sarah Jane Smith	70-67=137	−5

=== Third round ===
Saturday, July 1, 2017

Place	Player	Score	To par
T1	(South Korea) Chella Choi	66-70-67=203	−10
T1	(United States) Danielle Kang	69-66-68=203	−10
3	(South Korea) Jiyai Shin	70-71-64=205	−8
4	(Canada) Brooke Henderson	68-69-69=206	−7
T5	(South Korea) Kim Sei-young	69-66-72=207	−6
T5	(South Korea) Amy Yang	65-71-71=207	−6
T7	(Thailand) Moriya Jutanugarn	69-68-71=208	−5
T7	(United States) Kim Kaufman	68-71-69=208	−5
T7	(Chinese Taipei) Candie Kung	71-68-69=208	−5
T7	(South Korea) Lee Mi-hyang	69-67-72=208	−5
T7	(South Korea) Park Sung-hyun	71-70-67=208	−5
T7	(United States) Gerina Piller	73-66-69=208	−5
T7	(South Korea) Ryu So-yeon	69-68-71=208	−5
T7	(Sweden) Madelene Sagström	70-72-66=208	−5
T7	(United States) Lexi Thompson	70-69-69=208	−5
T7	(United States) Michelle Wie	68-70-70=208	−5

=== Final round ===
Sunday, July 2, 2017

Place	Player	Score	To par	Money ($)
1	(United States) Danielle Kang	69-66-68-68=271	−13	525,000
2	(Canada) Brooke Henderson	68-69-69-66=272	−12	322,446
3	(South Korea) Chella Choi	66-70-67-71=274	−10	233,911
T4	(South Korea) Kim Sei-young	69-66-72-68=275	−9	148,585
T4	(South Korea) Lee Mi-hyang	69-67-72-67=275	−9	148,585
T4	(South Korea) Amy Yang	65-71-71-68=275	−9	148,585
T7	(South Korea) Inbee Park	73-67-69-68=277	−7	93,565
T7	(United States) Lexi Thompson	70-69-69-69=277	−7	93,565
T9	(United States) Stacy Lewis	74-67-70-67=278	−6	75,029
T9	(United States) Kelly Shon	77-63-71-67=278	−6	75,029

==== Scorecard ====
Final round

Hole	1	2	3	4	5	6	7	8	9	10	11	12	13	14	15	16	17	18
Par	5	4	4	3	4	5	3	4	4	4	4	4	4	4	3	4	3	5
(United States) Kang	−10	−11	−10	−10	−10	−10	−10	−10	−10	−9	−10	−11	−12	−13	−13	−13	−12	−13
(Canada) Henderson	−8	−8	−8	−9	−9	−9	−10	−10	−10	−10	−10	−10	−10	−10	−10	−10	−11	−12
(South Korea) Choi	−10	−11	−11	−11	−11	−11	−11	−11	−10	−10	−9	−9	−9	−9	−9	−10	−10	−10
(South Korea) Kim	−7	−7	−7	−7	−7	−7	−7	−7	−7	−7	−7	−7	−7	−7	−8	−8	−8	−9
(South Korea) Lee	−4	−4	−4	−4	−4	−4	−4	−5	−5	−6	−7	−7	−7	−8	−8	−8	−8	−9
(South Korea) Yang	−6	−6	−6	−7	−7	−7	−7	−7	−7	−7	−7	−7	−8	−8	−8	−8	−8	−9
(South Korea) Shin	−8	−8	−7	−7	−7	−6	−6	−6	−6	−5	−4	−4	−3	−3	−3	−4	−4	−5

Cumulative tournament scores, relative to par

Birdie	Bogey
