= China LPGA Tour =

Women's professional golf tour

- Sport: Golf
- Founded: 2008
- Country: China
- Website: clpga.org/En

The China LPGA Tour is a professional golf tour for women organized by the China Ladies Professional Golfers' Association.

Founded in late 2008, the China LPGA Tour hosted six professional events in 2009, eight events the following year, and 12 events in 2011. By 2015 the tour had 15 events, four co-sanctioned with the Ladies European Tour and one each with the LPGA Tour, the ALPG Tour and the LAGT.

As one of the eight major women's tours (along with LPGA, JLPGA, KLPGA, LET, ALPG, Epson Tour and LET Access Series) performances on the China LPGA Tour carry Women's World Golf Rankings points.

== Tournaments of the China LPGA Tour ==
=== 2026 season ===
| Date | Tournament | Winner | WWGR pts | Note |
|---|---|---|---|---|
| 23 Jan | Orient Ningbo Challenge | (China) Ren Yijia | 3.00 | |
| 8 Mar | Blue Bay LPGA | (South Korea) Lee Mi-hyang | 19.70 | Co-sanctioned with the LPGA Tour |
| 28 Mar | Golfjoy Women's Open | (China) Ren Yijia | 3.10 | |
| 18 Apr | Chongqing Women's Open | (Thailand) Natthakritta Vongtaveelap | 3.00 | |
| 25 Apr | Tianjin Women's Open | (Thailand) Kultida Pramphun | 2.70 | |
| 2 May | China Golf Women's Legacy | (China) Ren Yijia | 2.70 | |
| 23 May | Orient Masters·Beijing Women's Open | (China) Liu Yujie | 2.40 | |
| 14 Jun | Moutai Singapore Ladies Masters | (China) Sui Xiang | 2.70 | |
| 27 Jun | Max Caihong Qingdao Women's Open | (China) Liu Wenbo | 2.20 | |
| 4 Sep | Straits Cup Ladies Classic | (Thailand) Budsabakorn Sukapan | 3.10 | Co-sanctioned with the Taiwan LPGA Tour |
| 26 Sep | Shandong Culture and Tourism Jinan Women's Open | (China) Wang Zixuan | 2.20 | |
| 11 Oct | Women's China Open | (China) Liu Yujie | 6.00 | |
| 18 Oct | Buick LPGA Shanghai | (China) Yin Ruoning | 32.90 | Co-sanctioned with the LPGA Tour |
| 8 Nov | Aramco China Championship | (Spain) Ana Peláez | 15.95 | Co-sanctioned with the Ladies European Tour |
| 11 Dec | Guangdong Women's Open | | | |
| 18 Dec | China LPGA Championship | | | |

=== 2025 season ===
| Date | Tournament | Winner | WWGR pts | Note |
|---|---|---|---|---|
| 9 Mar | Blue Bay LPGA | (Japan) Rio Takeda | 26 | Co-sanctioned with the LPGA Tour |
| 15 Mar | Golfjoy Women's Open | (China) Wang Zixuan | 3 | |
| 22 Mar | Mitsubishi Electric Automation Women's Open | (China) Ji Yuai | 4 | Co-sanctioned with the JLPGA StepUp Tour |
| 19 Apr | ZF.Kove Chongqing Women's Open | (China) Xu Ying | 3 | |
| 17 May | Beijing Women's Challenge | (China) Lin Qianhui | 3 | |
| 24 May | China Golf Women's Legacy | (China) An Zining | 3 | |
| 31 May | Zhu Chun Strait Cup Women's Open | (China) Zhou Shiyuan | 3 | |
| 28 Jun | Golf Liquor Challenge | (China) Xu Ying | 3 | |
| 23 Aug | Jackfish Guangdong Women's Open | (China) Liu Yujie | 3 | |
| 19 Sep | Zhangjiagang Shuangshan Challenge | (China) Ren Yijia | 2 | |
| 12 Oct | Buick LPGA Shanghai | (Thailand) Jeeno Thitikul | 31 | Co-sanctioned with the LPGA Tour |
| 19 Oct | Women's China Open | (China) Pang Runzhi | 6 | |
| 1 Nov | Fila Golf Women's Classic | (China) Xu Ying | 3 | |
| 8 Nov | Aramco China Championship | (China) Ruixin Liu | 16.5 | Co-sanctioned with the Ladies European Tour |
| 6 Dec | Wanning Women's Open | (China) Ren Yijia | 3 | |
| 13 Dec | CLPG Tour Women's Championship | (China) Shi Yuli | 3 | |

=== 2024 season ===
| Date | Tournament | Winner | WWGR pts | Note |
|---|---|---|---|---|
| 10 Mar | Blue Bay LPGA | (United States) Bailey Tardy | 26 | Co-sanctioned with the LPGA Tour |
| 26 Apr | Tianjin Women's Open Tianjin | (China) Ji Yuai | 2 | |
| 24 May | Beijing Women's Challenge | (China) Ren Yijia | 2 | |
| 7 Jun | Golf Liquor Guangdong Women's Open | (China) Cao Xinyu | 2 | |
| 16 Jun | Singapore Ladies Masters | (China) Pang Runzhi | 3 | |
| 30 Jun | Reignwood CLPGA Classic | (China) Sophie Han | 3 | |
| 15 Sep | Fila Golf Women's Classic | (China) Ji Yuai | 2 | |
| 6 Oct | Aramco Team Series – Shenzhen | (France) Celine Boutier | 18.5 | Co-sanctioned with the Ladies European Tour |
| 13 Oct | Buick LPGA Shanghai | (China) Yin Ruoning | 26 | Co-sanctioned with the LPGA Tour |
| 25 Oct | Zhangjiagang Shuangshan Challenge | (China) Zhou Shiyuan | 2 | |
| 9 Nov | Chongqing Women's Open | (China) Zhou Shiyuan | 3 | |
| 30 Nov | CLPG Tour Championship | (China) Li Shuying | 3 | |
| 15 Dec | Orient-China Women's Open | (China) Ji Yuai | 6 | |

=== 2023 season ===
| Date | Tournament | Winner | WWGR pts | Note |
|---|---|---|---|---|
| 3 Mar | Pre-season Challenge | (China) Ni Zixin (a) | 2 | |
| 28 Apr | Tianjin Ladies Challenge | (China) Sui Xiang | 2 | |
| 26 May | Beijing Women's Challenge | (China) Zeng Liqi | 3 | |
| 4 Jun | Mitsubishi Heavy Industries Championship | (Thailand) Sherman Santiwiwatthanaphong | 3 | |
| 30 Jun | Golf Liquor Guangdong Women's Open | (China) Zeng Liqi | 3 | |
| 9 Jul | Singapore Ladies Masters | (Singapore) Shannon Tan | 3 | |
| 25 Aug | Guotai Cup Men's and Women's Professional Match Play | (Thailand) Dussavi Soopimjit | 2 | |
| 1 Sep | CTBC Ladies Classic | (Thailand) Kusuma Meechai | 2 | |
| 15 Oct | Buick LPGA Shanghai | (United States) Angel Yin | 28 | Co-sanctioned with the LPGA Tour |
| 3 Nov | Zhangjiagang Shuangshan Challenge | (China) Tan Lingling | 3 | |
| 2 Dec | CGA Ladies Championship | (China) Michelle Zhang | 2 | |
| 14 Dec | Women's China Open | (China) Lei Ye | 6 | |

=== 2022 season ===
| Date | Tournament | Winner | WWGR pts |
|---|---|---|---|
| 10 Jul | Hangzhou International Championship | (China) An Tong (a) | 2 |
| 20 Aug | Golf Liquor Challenge | (China) Ni Zixin (a) | 2 |
| 2 Sep | CTBC Ladies Classic | (China) Sun Jiaze | 2 |
| 18 Nov | Beijing Ladies Challenge | (China) Sun Jiaze | 2 |
| 25 Nov | Zhangjiagang Shuangshan Challenge | (China) Zeng Liqi | 2 |
| 9 Dec | CGA Laides Championship | (China) Zeng Liqi | 6 |
| 23 Dec | Guowei Centre Plaza Zhuhai Challenge | (China) Xiang Sui | 3 |

=== 2021 season ===
| Date | Tournament | Winner | WWGR pts |
|---|---|---|---|
| 16 Apr | Nanshan Ladies Golf Challenge | (China) Yin Xiaowen (a) | 2 |
| 22 May | Wuhuanxing Ladies Challenge | (China) Yin Xiaowen (a) | 2 |
| 11 Jun | Lanhai Ladies Golf Challenge | (China) Liu Yiyi | 2 |
| 15 Oct | CTBC Zhuhai Challenge | (China) Zhang Yahui | 2 |
| 23 Oct | Guowei Centre Plaza Zhuhai Challenge | (China) Pan Yanhong | 2 |
| 31 Oct | Mitsubishi Heavy Industries Ladies Classic | (China) Liu Wenbo | 6 |
| 6 Nov | Zhangjiagang Shuangshan Challenge | (China) Zhao Zhimeng | 2 |

=== 2020 season ===
| Date | Tournament | Winner | WWGR pts |
|---|---|---|---|
| 21 Aug | Zhuhai Guowei Centre Plaza Hollywood Mansion Challenge | (China) Yin Ruoning | 2 |
| 28 Aug | Moutai Golf Liquor Zhuhai Golden Gulf Challenge | (China) Yin Ruoning | 2 |
| 4 Sep | Mitsubishi Heavy Industries Orient Masters | (China) Yin Ruoning | 3 |
| 24 Oct | Beijing Pearl Challenge | (China) Liu Wenbo | 3 |
| 30 Oct | Zhangjiagang Shuangshan Challenge | (China) Yin Xiaowen (a) | 3 |
| 8 Nov | Hangzhou International Championships | (China) Zhang Jienalin | 3 |

=== 2019 season ===
| Date | Tournament | Winner | WWGR pts | Note |
|---|---|---|---|---|
| 23 Mar | Hengqin Phoenix Tree Building Orient Golf Challenge | (Thailand) Renuka Suksukont | 4 | |
| 30 Mar | CTBC Ladies Classic | (China) Liu Yiyi | 4 | |
| 12 May | EFG Hong Kong Ladies Open | (China) Liu Yan | 4 | Co-sanctioned with the Taiwan LPGA Tour |
| 25 May | Le Coq Sportif Ladies Classic | (China) Zhang Weiwei | 4 | |
| 1 Jun | Golf Liquor Zhuhai Golden Gulf Challenge | (China) Du Mohan | 3 | |
| 7 Jun | Zhangjiagang Shuangshan Challenge | (Chinese Taipei) Hou Yu-chiang (a) | 3 | |
| 15 Jun | Orient Masters Wuhan Challenge | (China) Zhang Weiwei | 3 | |
| 7 Jul | Asiana Airlines Open | (South Korea) Lee Da-yeon | 17 | Co-sanctioned with the LPGA of Korea Tour |
| 17 Aug | CTBC Ladies Open | (Chinese Taipei) Hou Yu-sang (a) | 3 | Co-sanctioned with the Taiwan LPGA Tour |
| 1 Sep | Hangzhou International Championship | (China) Zhang Weiwei | 3 | |
| 6 Sep | Trust Golf Thailand LPGA Masters | (China) Zhang Weiwei | 4 | Co-sanctioned with the ALPG Tour and Thai LPGA Tour |
| 12 Oct | Mitsubishi Heavy Industries Orient Masters | (Japan) Ami Hirai | 3 | |
| 20 Oct | Buick LPGA Shanghai | (United States) Danielle Kang | 50 | Co-sanctioned with the LPGA Tour |
| 8 Dec | Macalline Women's China Open | (China) Lin Xiyu | 8 | |

=== 2018 season ===
| Date | Tournament | Winner | WWGR pts | Note |
|---|---|---|---|---|
| 19 Mar | Brunei Ladies Open | (South Korea) Hong Ran | 16.5 | Co-sanctioned with the LPGA of Korea Tour |
| 24 Mar | Henquin Phoenix Tree Building Orient Golf Challenge | (Thailand) Chonlada Chayanun | 2 | |
| 31 Mar | CTBC Ladies Classic | (Chinese Taipei) Yu-Ju Chen | 3 | |
| 28 Apr | Zhangjiagang Shuangshan Challenge | (Thailand) Saranporn Langkulgasettrin | 3 | |
| 13 May | EFG Hong Kong Ladies Open | (Thailand) Saranporn Langkulgasettrin | 3 | Co-sanctioned with the Taiwan LPGA Tour |
| 26 May | Le Coq Sportif Beijing Ladies Classic | (China) Shi Yuting | 2 | |
| 2 Jun | Orient Masters Wuhan Challenge | (Chinese Taipei) Ching Huang | 2 | |
| 9 Jun | CLPGA Zhuhai Heritage | (Thailand) Yupaporn Kawinpakorn | 2 | |
| 8 Jul | Asiana Airlines Open | (South Korea) Kim Ji-hyun2 | 19 | Co-sanctioned with the LPGA of Korea Tour |
| 14 Sep | Tieling Longshan Golf Challenge | (China) Luo Ying | 2 | |
| 21 Sep | PTT Thailand LPGA Masters | (Thailand) Parinda Phokan | 4 | Co-sanctioned with the ALPG Tour and Thai LPGA Tour |
| 13 Oct | Mitsubishi Heavy Industries Orient Masters | (South Korea) Lee Solar | 3 | |
| 21 Oct | Buick LPGA Shanghai | (United States) Danielle Kang | 50 | Co-sanctioned with the LPGA Tour |
| 10 Nov | Blue Bay LPGA | (Mexico) Gaby López | 24 | Co-sanctioned with the LPGA Tour |
| 16 Dec | China Ladies Open | (Chinese Taipei) Min Lee | 6 | |

=== 2017 season ===
| Date | Tournament | Winner | WWGR pts | Note |
|---|---|---|---|---|
| 19 Mar | World Ladies Championship | (South Korea) Kim Hae-rym | 19 | Co-sanctioned with the Ladies European Tour and LPGA of Korea Tour |
| 25 Mar | Zhuhai Henquin Phoenix Tree Building Challenge | (China) Zhang Weiwei | 2 | |
| 22 Apr | Zhangjiagang Shuangshan Challenge | (China) Liu Wenbo (a) | 2 | |
| 3 Jun | Le Coq Sportif Beijing Ladies Classic | (China) Shi Yuting | 2 | |
| 11 Jun | Hong Kong Ladies Open | (Thailand) Supamas Sangchan | 2 | Co-sanctioned with the Taiwan LPGA Tour |
| 17 Jun | Wuhan Challenge | (Thailand) Saranporn Langkulgasettrin | 2 | |
| 9 Jul | Kumho Tire Ladies Open | (South Korea) Park Bo-mi | 14 | Co-sanctioned with the LPGA of Korea Tour |
| 21 Jul | CLPGA Zhuhai Heritage | (Thailand) Saranporn Langkulgasettrin | 2 | |
| 18 Aug | CLPGA Beijing Heritage | (Singapore) Amanda Tan | 2 | |
| 15 Sep | Thailand LPGA Masters | (Thailand) Saranporn Langkulgasettrin | 2 | Co-sanctioned with the ALPG Tour and Thai LPGA Tour |
| 8 Oct | Alisports LPGA | Tournament canceled | – | Co-sanctioned with the LPGA Tour |
| 14 Oct | Xiamen Orient Masters | (Thailand) Prima Thammaraks | 3 | |
| 11 Nov | Blue Bay LPGA | (China) Shanshan Feng | 28 | Co-sanctioned with the LPGA Tour |
| 19 Nov | Sanya Ladies Open | (France) Céline Boutier | 6 | Co-sanctioned with the Ladies European Tour and the LAGT |
| 9 Dec | ICTSI Philippines Ladies Masters | (Thailand) Renuka Suksukont | 2 | |
| 17 Dec | China Ladies Open | Tournament canceled | – | Co-sanctioned with the LPGA of Korea Tour |
| 23 Dec | CTBC Ladies Open | (Chinese Taipei) Hsu Wei-Ling | 5 | Co-sanctioned with the Taiwan LPGA Tour |

=== 2016 season ===
| Date | Tournament | Winner | WWGR pts | Note |
|---|---|---|---|---|
| 13 Mar | World Ladies Championship | (South Korea) Lee Jung-min (n/a) - individual (South Korea) Lee Jung-min & Ko Jin-young - team | 19 – | Co-sanctioned with the Ladies European Tour |
| 19 Mar | Zhuhai Henquin Phoenix Tree Building Challenge | (China) Shi Yuting | 3 | |
| 15 May | Buick Championship | (China) Shanshan Feng | 16.5 | Co-sanctioned with the Ladies European Tour |
| 21 May | Le Coq Sportif Beijing Ladies Classic | (China) Li Jia-yun | 3 | |
| 3 Jun | Zhangjiagang Shuangshan Challenge | (Thailand) Ploychompoo Wirairungrueng | 2 | |
| 3 Jul | Kumho Tire Ladies Open | (South Korea) Lee Min-young | 15.5 | Co-sanctioned with the LPGA of Korea Tour |
| 3 Sep | CTBC Ladies Open | (Chinese Taipei) Teresa Lu | 4 | Co-sanctioned with the Taiwan LPGA Tour |
| 2 Oct | Reignwood LPGA Classic | (South Korea) Kim In-kyung | 28 | Co-sanctioned with the LPGA Tour |
| 16 Oct | Xiamen International Ladies Open | (Netherlands) Anne van Dam | 6 | Co-sanctioned with the Ladies European Tour |
| 23 Oct | Blue Bay LPGA | (Australia) Minjee Lee | 26 | Co-sanctioned with the LPGA Tour |
| 29 Oct | Sanya Ladies Open | (Thailand) Supamas Sangchan | 6 | Co-sanctioned with the Ladies European Tour and the LAGT |
| 11 Nov | CLPGA Beijing Heritage | (Chinese Taipei) Rebecca Tsai | 2 | |
| 18 Dec | Hyundai China Ladies Open | (South Korea) Kim Hyo-joo | 19 | Co-sanctioned with the LPGA of Korea Tour |

=== 2015 season ===
| Date | Tournament | Winner | WWGR pts | Note |
|---|---|---|---|---|
| 15 Mar | World Ladies Championship | (South Korea) Ryu So-yeon - individual (South Korea) Ryu So-yeon & Inbee Park - team | 19 – | Co-sanctioned with the Ladies European Tour |
| 28 Mar | Zhuhai Classic | (Chinese Taipei) Liu Babe | 3 | |
| 19 Apr | Australia Classic | (China) Pan Yanhong | 6 | Co-sanctioned with the ALPG Tour |
| 10 May | Buick Championship | (China) Shanshan Feng | 17 | Co-sanctioned with the Ladies European Tour |
| 24 May | Srixon XXIO Ladies Open | (Thailand) Budsabakorn Sukapan | 3 | |
| 30 May | Bank of Qingdao Golden Mountain Challenge | (China) Yan Panpan | 2 | |
| 6 Jun | Beijing Challenge | (China) Pan Yanhong | 2 | |
| 14 Jun | CTBC Shanghai Ladies Classic | (Malaysia) Michelle Koh | 3 | |
| 5 Jul | Kumho Tire Ladies Open | (South Korea) Kim Hyo-joo | 17 | Co-sanctioned with the LPGA of Korea Tour |
| 5 Sep | Wuhan Challenge | (South Korea) Suh Bo-mi | 2 | |
| 26 Sep | CTBC Ladies Open | (Thailand) Budsabakorn Sukapan | 3 | Co-sanctioned with the Taiwan LPGA Tour |
| 11 Oct | Xiamen International Ladies Open | (South Korea) Hye In Yeom | 12 | Co-sanctioned with the Ladies European Tour |
| 1 Nov | Blue Bay LPGA | (South Korea) Kim Sei-young | 43 | Co-sanctioned with the LPGA Tour |
| 8 Nov | Sanya Ladies Open | (China) Lin Xiyu | 16 | Co-sanctioned with the Ladies European Tour and the LAGT |
| 13 Dec | Hyundai China Ladies Open | (South Korea) Park Sung-hyun | 17.5 | Co-sanctioned with the LPGA of Korea Tour |

=== 2014 season ===
| Date | Tournament | Winner | WWGR pts | Note |
|---|---|---|---|---|
| 10 Mar | World Ladies Championship | (South Korea) Inbee Park - individual (South Korea) Inbee Park & Ryu So-Yeon - team | 20.5 – | Co-sanctioned with the Ladies European Tour |
| 22 Mar | Zhuhai Classic | (Chinese Taipei) Babe Liu | 2 | |
| 17 May | Buick Ladies Invitational | (China) Pan Yanhong | 2 | |
| 24 May | Bank of Qingdao Golden Mountain Challenge | (Chinese Taipei) Babe Liu | 2 | |
| 31 May | Beijing Challenge | (South Korea) Jang So-young | 2 | |
| 7 Jun | Srixon XXIO Ladies Open | (China) Pan Yanhong | 2 | |
| 21 Jun | Shanghai Classic | (Chinese Taipei) Li Jiayun | 2 | |
| 28 Jul | Wuhan Challenge | (Thailand) Pavarisa Yoktuan | 2 | |
| 6 Jul | Kumho Tire Ladies Open | (South Korea) Kim Hyo-joo | 18.5 | Co-sanctioned with the LPGA of Korea Tour |
| 30 Aug | Xiamen Challenge | (China) Wang Ziyi (a) | 2 | |
| 20 Sep | CTBC Ladies Open | (Thailand) Pimpadsorn Sangkagaro | 2 | |
| 5 Oct | Reignwood LPGA Classic | (South Korea) Mirim Lee | 34 | Co-sanctioned with the LPGA Tour |
| 26 Oct | Blue Bay LPGA | (South Africa) Lee-Anne Pace | 34 | Co-sanctioned with the LPGA Tour |
| 9 Nov | Sanya's Hills Ladies Classic | (China) Lin Xiyu | 2 | |
| 16 Nov | Sanya Ladies Open | (China) Lin Xiyu | 15 | Co-sanctioned with the Ladies European Tour and the LAGT |
| 23 Nov | Xiamen Open International | (Chinese Taipei) Cheng Ssu-chia (a) | 15 | |
| 14 Dec | Hyundai China Ladies Open | (South Korea) Kim Hyo-joo | 18 | Co-sanctioned with the LPGA of Korea Tour |

=== 2013 season ===
| Date | Tournament | Winner | WWGR pts | Note |
|---|---|---|---|---|
| 10 Mar | World Ladies Championship | (Norway) Suzann Pettersen | 20.5 | Co-sanctioned with the Ladies European Tour |
| 30 Mar | Shanghai Classic | (Thailand) Ajira Nualraksa | 2 | |
| 6 Apr | Ningbo Challenge | (Chinese Taipei) Lin Shan-Wei | 2 | |
| 12 May | Srixon XXIO Ladies Open | (China) Yu Liu (a) | 2 | |
| 25 May | Beijing Challenge | (Thailand) Wichanee Meechai | 2 | |
| 1 Jun | Bank of Qingdao Golden Mountain Challenge | (Chinese Taipei) Lin Shan-Wei | 2 | |
| 7 Jul | Kuhmo Tires Ladies Open | (South Korea) Kim Da-na | 18 | Co-sanctioned with the LPGA of Korea Tour |
| 27 Jul | Wuhan Challenge | (Thailand) Kusuma Meechai | 2 | |
| 6 Oct | Reignwood LPGA Classic | (China) Shanshan Feng | 40 | Co-sanctioned with the LPGA Tour |
| 27 Oct | Sanya Ladies Open | (South Africa) Lee-Anne Pace | 15 | Co-sanctioned with the Ladies European Tour |
| 3 Nov | China Suzhou Taihu Open | (France) Gwladys Nocera | 15 | Co-sanctioned with the Ladies European Tour |
| 10 Nov | Sanya's Hills Ladies Classic | (China) Lin Xiyu | 2 | |
| 15 Dec | Hyundai China Ladies Open | (South Korea) Jang Ha-na | 18.5 | Co-sanctioned with the LPGA of Korea Tour |

== See also ==
- Women's sports
- PGA Tour China
