= 2019 ANA Inspiration =

Tournament information
- Dates: April 4–7, 2019
- Location: Rancho Mirage, California; 33.798°N 116.433°W
- Courses: Mission Hills Country Club; Dinah Shore; Tournament Course
- Tour: LPGA Tour
- Format: Stroke play - 72 holes

Statistics
- Par: 72
- Length: 6,763 yards (6,184 m)
- Field: 112 players, 77 after cut
- Cut: 149 (+5)
- Prize fund: $3.0 million
- Winner's share: 450,000

Champion
- (South Korea) Ko Jin-young
- 278 (−10)
- Location in the United States Location in California

The 2019 ANA Inspiration was the 48th ANA Inspiration LPGA golf tournament, held April 4–7 at the Dinah Shore Tournament Course of Mission Hills Country Club in Rancho Mirage, California. It was its 37th year as a major championship, and Golf Channel televised the event for the ninth consecutive year.

Pernilla Lindberg missed the cut, the first defending champion not to play the weekend in six years.

Ko Jin-young won her first major by three strokes over Lee Mi-hyang.

== Field ==
Players who have qualified for the event are listed below. Players are listed under the first category in which they qualified; additional qualifying categories are shown in parentheses.

1. Active LPGA Tour Hall of Fame members (must have participated in ten official LPGA Tour tournaments within the 12 months prior to the commitment deadline)

Juli Inkster (2)

2. Winners of all previous ANA Inspirations

Lydia Ko (4,5,6,8,9), Stacy Lewis (5), Brittany Lincicome (5,8), Pernilla Lindberg (5,6,8), Inbee Park (3,5,6,8,9), Morgan Pressel, Ryu So-yeon (5,7,8,9), Lexi Thompson (5,6,7,8,9), Yani Tseng, Karrie Webb

Yoo Sun-young (6) did not play

3. Winners of the U.S. Women's Open, Women's PGA Championship, and Women's British Open in the previous five years

Chun In-gee (4,8,9), Georgia Hall (5,7,8,9,10-LET), Brooke Henderson (5,8,9), Ariya Jutanugarn (5,6,7,8,9), Danielle Kang (5,7,8,9), In-Kyung Kim (5,8,9), Brittany Lang (5), Mo Martin (7,8), Park Sung-hyun (5,6,8,9), Michelle Wie (5,8)

4. Winners of The Evian Championship in the previous five years

Kim Hyo-joo (7,8), Anna Nordqvist (5,8), Angela Stanford (5,6,7,8)

5. Winners of official LPGA Tour tournaments from the 2016 ANA Inspiration through the week immediately preceding the 2019 ANA Inspiration

Marina Alex (8,9), Céline Boutier (8), Carlota Ciganda (7,8,9), Shanshan Feng (8,9), Nasa Hataoka (7,8,9), Charley Hull (6,8,9), Ji Eun-hee (8,9), Moriya Jutanugarn (6,8,9), Cristie Kerr (8), Kim Sei-young (7,8,9), Katherine Kirk (8), Ko Jin-young (8,9,12), Nelly Korda (6,8,9), Jessica Korda (6,7,8,9), Lee Mi-hyang (8), Minjee Lee (8,9), Mirim Lee (8), Gaby López (8), Caroline Masson (6,8), Haru Nomura, Annie Park (8), Jenny Shin (8), Thidapa Suwannapura (8), Amy Yang (8,9)

Jang Ha-na did not play.

6. All players who finished in the top-20 in the previous year's ANA Inspiration

Brittany Altomare (8), Jodi Ewart Shadoff (8), Hannah Green (8), Lee Jeong-eun (9,10-KLPGA), Azahara Muñoz (8), Amy Olson (7,8), Ryann O'Toole (8), Pornanong Phatlum (7,8), Beatriz Recari, Jennifer Song (8), Ayako Uehara (8)

7. All players who finished in the top-5 of the previous year's U.S. Women's Open, Women's PGA Championship, Women's British Open and The Evian Championship

Austin Ernst (8,9), Mamiko Higa, Wei-Ling Hsu (8), Sarah Jane Smith (8), Patty Tavatanakit (a,15), Angel Yin (8)

8. Top-80 on the previous year's season-ending LPGA Tour official money list

Aditi Ashok, Ashleigh Buhai, Pei-Yun Chien, Chella Choi, Jacqui Concolino, Lindy Duncan, Sandra Gal, Jaye Marie Green, Haeji Kang, Megan Khang, Bronte Law, Lee Jeong-eun, Yu Liu, Ally McDonald, Su-Hyun Oh, Jane Park, Park Hee-young, Madelene Sagström, Lizette Salas (9), Mariah Stackhouse, Emma Talley, Pannarat Thanapolboonyaras, Maria Torres, Mariajo Uribe, Sakura Yokomine

Caroline Inglis did not play.

9. Top-30 on the Women's World Golf Rankings as of a March 11, 2019

Jiyai Shin (10-JLPGA)

Ahn Sun-ju (10-JLPGA) and Choi Hye-jin did not play.

10. Top-2 players from the previous year's season-ending Ladies European Tour Order of Merit, LPGA of Japan Tour money list and LPGA of Korea Tour money list

Anne Van Dam

Bae Seon-woo did not play.

11. Top-20 players plus ties on the current year LPGA Tour official money list at the end of the last official tournament prior to the current ANA Inspiration, not otherwise qualified above, provided such players are within the top-80 positions on the current year LPGA Tour official money list at the beginning of the tournament competition

Kristen Gillman, M. J. Hur, Kim Kaufman, Sarah Kemp, Alison Lee, Lin Xiyu, Nanna Koerstz Madsen, Sarah Schmelzel, Alena Sharp, Marissa Steen, Lauren Stephenson, Linnea Strom, Charlotte Thomas, Jing Yan

12. Previous year's Louise Suggs Rolex Rookie of the Year

Already qualified

13. Previous year's U.S. Women's Amateur champion, provided she is still an amateur at the beginning of tournament competition

Kristen Gillman turned professional, forfeiting this exemption, but she qualified under category 11.

14. Any LPGA Member who did not compete in the previous year's ANA Inspiration major due to injury, illness or maternity, who subsequently received a medical/maternity extension of membership from the LPGA in the previous calendar year, provided they were otherwise qualified to compete in the previous year's ANA Inspiration

Laura Gonzalez Escallon, Gerina Piller

15. Up to six sponsor invitations for top-ranked amateur players

Rachel Heck (a), Frida Kinhult (a), Xin Kou (a), Albane Valenzuela (a)

== Round summaries ==
=== First round ===
Thursday, April 4, 2019

Ally McDonald shot a 4-under-par 68 to take a one-stroke lead over four players, including 2014 champion Lexi Thompson. Defending champion Pernilla Lindberg was tied for 42nd at +1.

Place	Player	Score	To par
1	(United States) Ally McDonald	68	−4
T2	(South Korea) Kim Hyo-joo	69	−3
T2	(South Korea) Ko Jin-young	69	−3
T2	(Sweden) Linnea Ström	69	−3
T2	(United States) Lexi Thompson	69	−3
T6	(United States) Cristie Kerr	70	−2
T6	(New Zealand) Lydia Ko	70	−2
T6	(United States) Jessica Korda	70	−2
T6	(South Korea) Lee Mi-hyang	70	−2
T6	(China) Lin Xiyu	70	−2
T6	(United States) Jane Park	70	−2
T6	(United States) Lizette Salas	70	−2
T6	(United States) Lauren Stephenson	70	−2
T6	(China) Yan Jing	70	−2
T6	(South Korea) Amy Yang	70	−2

=== Second round ===
Friday, April 5, 2019

Place	Player	Score	To par
1	(South Korea) In-Kyung Kim	71-65=136	−8
2	(Australia) Katherine Kirk	71-68=139	−5
T3	(South Korea) Ko Jin-young	69-71=140	−4
T3	(United States) Ally McDonald	68-72=140	−4
T5	(England) Charley Hull	72-69=141	−3
T5	(United States) Danielle Kang	72-69=141	−3
T5	(South Korea) Park Sung-hyun	71-70=141	−3
T5	(United States) Lexi Thompson	69-72=141	−3
T5	(China) Jing Yan	70-71=141	−3
T10	(South Korea) Lee Jeong-eun	71-71=142	−2
T10	(South Korea) Amy Yang	70-72=142	−2

=== Third round ===
Saturday, April 6, 2019

Place	Player	Score	To par
1	(South Korea) Ko Jin-young	69-71-68=208	−8
2	(South Korea) In-Kyung Kim	71-65-73=209	−7
T3	(United States) Danielle Kang	72-69-70=211	−5
T3	(South Korea) Lee Mi-hyang	70-73-68=211	−5
T5	(Australia) Katherine Kirk	71-68-74=213	−3
T5	(South Korea) Lee Jeong-eun	71-71-71=213	−3
T5	(Canada) Alena Sharp	76-70-67=213	−3
T8	(Canada) Brooke Henderson	71-72-71=214	−2
T8	(United States) Jessica Korda	70-73-71=214	−2
T8	(United States) Stacy Lewis	71-73-70=214	−2
T8	(China) Lin Xiyu	70-74-70=214	−2
T8	(United States) Ally McDonald	68-72-74=214	−2
T8	(South Korea) Park Sung-hyun	71-70-73=214	−2
T8	(United States) Angel Yin	71-74-69=214	−2

=== Final round ===
Sunday, April 7, 2019

Place	Player	Score	To par	Prize money (US$)
1	(South Korea) Ko Jin-young	69-71-68-70=278	−10	450,000
2	(South Korea) Lee Mi-hyang	70-73-68-70=281	−7	275,721
3	(United States) Lexi Thompson	69-72-74-67=282	−6	200,016
T4	(Spain) Carlota Ciganda	72-72-71-68=283	−5	139,634
T4	(South Korea) In-Kyung Kim	71-65-73-74=283	−5	139,634
T6	(United States) Kristen Gillman	74-71-73-66=284	−4	74,472
T6	(United States) Danielle Kang	72-69-70-73=284	−4	74,472
T6	(South Korea) Kim Hyo-joo	69-76-70-69=284	−4	74,472
T6	(United States) Jessica Korda	70-73-71-70=284	−4	74,472
T6	(South Korea) Lee Jeong-eun	71-71-71-71=284	−4	74,472
T6	(United States) Ally McDonald	68-72-74-70=284	−4	74,472

==== Scorecard ====
Final round

Hole	1	2	3	4	5	6	7	8	9	10	11	12	13	14	15	16	17	18
Par	4	5	4	4	3	4	4	3	5	4	5	4	4	3	4	4	3	5
(South Korea) Ko	−8	−9	−9	−9	−10	−10	−10	−9	−9	−9	−10	−10	−9	−9	−8	−9	−9	−10
(South Korea) M-h Lee	−6	−7	−7	−7	−7	−7	−6	−6	−6	−6	−6	−7	−7	−7	−7	−7	−7	−7
(United States) Thompson	−2	−2	−1	−1	−2	−2	−2	−2	−2	−3	−4	−3	−4	−4	−5	−6	−6	−6
(Spain) Ciganda	−2	−2	−2	−3	−3	−3	−3	−4	−4	−4	−5	−5	−5	−5	−5	−5	−5	−5
(South Korea) Kim	−7	−7	−6	−6	−6	−6	−6	−6	−6	−6	−4	−4	−4	−4	−5	−5	−5	−5

Cumulative tournament scores, relative to par

Birdie	Bogey	Double bogey
