= Golf at the 2024 Summer Olympics – Women's individual =

Women's golf at the Games of the XXXIII Olympiad
- Olympic Golf
- Venue: Le Golf National (Albatros Course)
- Dates: 7–10 August 2024
- Competitors: 60 from 33 nations
- Winning score: 278 (−10)

Medalists
1st place, gold medalist(s)		Lydia Ko	New Zealand
2nd place, silver medalist(s)		Esther Henseleit	Germany
3rd place, bronze medalist(s)		Lin Xiyu	China

The women's individual golf event at the 2024 Summer Olympics took place from 7 to 10 August 2024 at the Le Golf National. 60 golfers from 33 nations competed.

== Competition format and schedule ==
All times are Central European Summer Time (UTC+2)

Date	Time	Round
Wednesday, 7 August 2024	9:00	First round
Thursday, 8 August 2024	9:00	Second round
Friday, 9 August 2024	9:00	Third round
Saturday, 10 August 2024	9:00	Final round

== Results ==
=== First round ===
Wednesday, 7 August 2024

Perrine Delacour of France had the honor of hitting the opening tee shot. Fellow French golfer Céline Boutier shot a seven-under-par round of 67 to take a three stroke lead over Ashleigh Buhai of South Africa. Only 12 players broke par and the scoring average was 74.1 (+3.1).

Rank	Player	Nation	Score	To par
1	Céline Boutier	France	65	−7
2	Ashleigh Buhai	South Africa	68	−4
T3	Gaby López	Mexico	70	−2
T3	Morgane Métraux	Switzerland	70	−2
T3	Mariajo Uribe	Colombia	70	−2
T3	Lilia Vu	United States	70	−2
T7	Celine Borge	Norway	71	−1
T7	Diksha Dagar	India	71	−1
T7	Minjee Lee	Australia	71	−1
T7	Lin Xiyu	China	71	−1
T7	Alena Sharp	Canada	71	−1
T7	Miyū Yamashita	Japan	71	−1

=== Second round ===
Thursday, 8 August 2024

Morgane Métraux of Switzerland shot a second round 66 to take a one-stroke lead over Yin Ruoning of China. First round leader Céline Boutier of France shot a 76 to fall five strokes off the lead. Defending gold medalist Nelly Korda was six strokes behind Métraux.

Rank	Player	Nation	Score	To par
1	Morgane Métraux	Switzerland	70-66=136	−8
2	Yin Ruoning	China	72-65=137	−7
3	Lydia Ko	New Zealand	72-67=139	−5
T4	Pia Babnik	Slovenia	74-66=140	−4
T4	Mariajo Uribe	Colombia	70-70=140	−4
T6	Céline Boutier	France	65-76=141	−3
T6	Ashleigh Buhai	South Africa	68-73=141	−3
T6	Lin Xiyu	China	71-70=141	−3
T6	Bianca Pagdanganan	Philippines	72-69=141	−3
T6	Atthaya Thitikul	Thailand	72-69=141	−3
T6	Miyū Yamashita	Japan	71-70=141	−3

=== Third round ===
Friday, 9 August 2024

Lydia Ko of New Zealand shot a third round 68 to move into a tied with second round leader Morgane Métraux of Switzerland. Miyū Yamashita (Japan) and Rose Zhang (United States) were two strokes off the lead.

Rank	Player	Nation	Score	To par
T1	Lydia Ko	New Zealand	72-67-68=207	−9
T1	Morgane Métraux	Switzerland	70-66-71=207	−9
T3	Miyū Yamashita	Japan	71-70-68=209	−7
T3	Rose Zhang	United States	72-70-67=209	−7
5	Atthaya Thitikul	Thailand	72-69-69=210	−6
6	Mariajo Uribe	Colombia	70-70-71=211	−5
T7	Céline Boutier	France	65-76-71=212	−4
T7	Nelly Korda	United States	72-70-70=212	−4
T7	Lin Xiyu	China	71-70-71=212	−4
T7	Yin Ruoning	China	72-65-75=212	−4

=== Final round ===
Saturday, 10 August 2024

Lydia Ko of New Zealand shot a final round 71 to take the gold medal by two strokes. Esther Henseleit of Germany shot a 66, the second best round of the day, to win the silver medal and Lin Xiyu of China took the bronze medal, one stroke behind Henseleit. Ko had previously won a silver medal at the 2016 Olympics and a bronze medal at the 2020 Olympics. The win also earned Ko entry into the LPGA Hall of Fame by providing the final point she needed for automatic qualification.

Rank	Player	Nation	Rd 1	Rd 2	Rd 3	Rd 4	Total	To par
1st place, gold medalist(s)	Lydia Ko	New Zealand	72	67	68	71	278	−10
2nd place, silver medalist(s)	Esther Henseleit	Germany	72	73	69	66	280	−8
3rd place, bronze medalist(s)	Lin Xiyu	China	71	70	71	69	281	−7
T4	Bianca Pagdanganan	Philippines	72	69	73	68	282	−6
T4	Hannah Green	Australia	77	70	66	69	282	−6
T4	Amy Yang	South Korea	72	71	70	69	282	−6
T4	Miyū Yamashita	Japan	71	70	68	73	282	−6
T8	Hsu Wei-ling	Chinese Taipei	74	69	72	68	283	−5
T8	Rose Zhang	United States	72	70	67	74	283	−5
T10	Maja Stark	Sweden	72	72	71	69	284	−4
T10	Yin Ruoning	China	72	65	75	72	284	−4
T10	Mariajo Uribe	Colombia	70	70	71	73	284	−4
T13	Albane Valenzuela	Switzerland	72	74	74	65	285	−3
T13	Dottie Ardina	Philippines	76	72	69	68	285	−3
T13	Ashleigh Buhai	South Africa	68	73	74	70	285	−3
T13	Azahara Muñoz	Spain	78	69	69	69	285	−3
T13	Brooke Henderson	Canada	74	73	67	71	285	−3
T18	Pei-Yun Chien	Chinese Taipei	76	71	71	68	286	−2
T18	Céline Boutier	France	65	76	71	74	286	−2
T18	Atthaya Thitikul	Thailand	72	69	69	76	286	−2
T18	Morgane Métraux	Switzerland	70	66	71	79	286	−2
T22	Minjee Lee	Australia	71	74	71	71	287	−1
T22	Pia Babnik	Slovenia	74	66	74	73	287	−1
T22	Nelly Korda	United States	72	70	70	75	287	−1
T25	Kim Hyo-joo	South Korea	76	70	73	69	288	E
T25	Ko Jin-young	South Korea	73	73	73	69	288	E
T27	Charley Hull	Great Britain	81	71	69	68	289	+1
T27	Linn Grant	Sweden	74	71	73	71	289	+1
T29	Aditi Ashok	India	72	71	79	68	290	+2
T29	Emma Spitz	Austria	75	70	75	70	290	+2
T29	Gaby López	Mexico	70	74	76	70	290	+2
T29	Celine Borge	Norway	71	73	75	71	290	+2
T29	Manon De Roey	Belgium	72	75	71	72	290	+2
T29	Patty Tavatanakit	Thailand	76	71	68	75	290	+2
35	Alexandra Försterling	Germany	76	75	71	70	292	+4
T36	Nanna Koerstz Madsen	Denmark	74	75	72	72	293	+5
T36	Lilia Vu	United States	70	73	76	74	293	+5
T36	Georgia Hall	Great Britain	74	74	71	74	293	+5
39	Stephanie Meadow	Ireland	78	74	72	70	294	+6
40	Shannon Tan	Singapore	78	70	73	74	295	+7
41	Klára Spilková	Czech Republic	77	73	70	76	296	+8
T42	Perrine Delacour	France	79	78	74	66	297	+9
T42	Alena Sharp	Canada	71	76	77	73	297	+9
T44	Emily Kristine Pedersen	Denmark	73	79	75	72	299	+11
T44	Paula Reto	South Africa	78	73	76	72	299	+11
T44	Anne van Dam	Netherlands	75	74	78	72	299	+11
T47	Madelene Stavnar	Norway	76	73	76	75	300	+12
T47	Sarah Schober	Austria	75	73	73	79	300	+12
T49	Ana Belac	Slovenia	77	72	76	76	301	+13
T49	Carlota Ciganda	Spain	73	78	75	75	301	+13
T49	Diksha Dagar	India	71	72	80	78	301	+13
52	Ines Laklalech	Morocco	78	75	77	73	303	+15
53	Alessandra Fanali	Italy	75	76	77	76	304	+16
54	Yuka Saso	Japan	77	74	72	82	305	+17
T55	Ashley Lau	Malaysia	72	77	79	78	306	+18
T55	Sára Kousková	Czech Republic	73	77	79	77	306	+18
57	Ursula Wikström	Finland	82	72	81	72	307	+19
58	María Fassi	Mexico	78	82	74	75	309	+21
59	Leona Maguire	Ireland	78	79	83	71	311	+23
WD	Noora Komulainen	Finland	84	82	78	DNF	244	DNF
