= Golf at the 2020 Summer Olympics – Qualification =

Qualification for Golf at the 2020 Summer Olympics in Tokyo was determined not by any form of qualifying tournament, but by the rankings maintained by the International Golf Federation.

Qualification was based on world ranking (Official World Golf Ranking for men, Women's World Golf Rankings for women) as of 21 June 2021 (men) or 28 June 2021 (women), with a total of 60 players qualifying in each of the men's and women's events. The 2020 Summer Olympics were postponed to 2021 due to the COVID-19 pandemic. The top 15 players of each gender qualified, with a limit of four golfers per country that could qualify this way. The remaining spots went to the highest-ranked players from countries that did not already have two golfers qualified, with a limit of two per country. The IGF guaranteed that at least one golfer qualified from the host nation and at least one from each continent (Africa, the Americas, Asia, Europe, and Oceania). The IGF posted weekly lists of qualifiers based on current rankings for men and women.

== Qualified players ==
=== Men ===
The final rankings for the men's competition were released on 22 June 2021.

Rank	Name	Country	World ranking
1	Justin Thomas	United States	3
2	Collin Morikawa	United States	4
3	Xander Schauffele	United States	5
4	Patrick Reed	United States	9
5	Rory McIlroy	Ireland	10
6	Viktor Hovland	Norway	14
7	Hideki Matsuyama	Japan	16
8	Paul Casey	Great Britain	20
9	Abraham Ancer	Mexico	23
10	Im Sung-jae	South Korea	26
11	Cameron Smith	Australia	28
12	Joaquín Niemann	Chile	31
13	Tommy Fleetwood	Great Britain	33
14	Corey Conners	Canada	36
15	Garrick Higgo	South Africa	38
16	Shane Lowry	Ireland	42
17	Marc Leishman	Australia	43
18	Christiaan Bezuidenhout	South Africa	46
19	Kim Si-woo	South Korea	49
20	Carlos Ortiz	Mexico	53
21	Mackenzie Hughes	Canada	63
22	Sebastián Muñoz	Colombia	67
23	Guido Migliozzi	Italy	72
24	Rikuya Hoshino	Japan	76
25	Antoine Rozner	France	78
26	Thomas Detry	Belgium	94
27	Alex Norén	Sweden	95
28	Thomas Pieters	Belgium	107
29	Kalle Samooja	Finland	117
30	Matthias Schwab	Austria	118
31	Rasmus Højgaard	Denmark	121
32	Sami Välimäki	Finland	122
33	Jazz Janewattananond	Thailand	129
34	Jhonattan Vegas	Venezuela	130
35	Henrik Norlander	Sweden	136
36	Mito Pereira	Chile	146
37	Adri Arnaus	Spain	147
38	Joachim B. Hansen	Denmark	151
39	Rory Sabbatini	Slovakia	167
40	Sepp Straka	Austria	174
41	Ryan Fox	New Zealand	178
42	Renato Paratore	Italy	180
43	Pan Cheng-tsung	Chinese Taipei	181
44	Romain Langasque	France	186
45	Adrian Meronk	Poland	189
46	Maximilian Kieffer	Germany	193
47	Jorge Campillo	Spain	213
48	Juvic Pagunsan	Philippines	216
49	Ondřej Lieser	Czech Republic	231
50	Scott Vincent	Zimbabwe	239
51	Gunn Charoenkul	Thailand	259
52	Hurly Long	Germany	263
53	Fabrizio Zanotti	Paraguay	280
54	Rafael Campos	Puerto Rico	281
55	Gavin Green	Malaysia	286
56	Yuan Yechun	China	291
57	Kristian Krogh Johannessen	Norway	292
58	Wu Ashun	China	315
59	Anirban Lahiri	India	340
60	Udayan Mane	India	356

The following men removed themselves from possible qualification (world ranking as of 21 June listed):

- Dustin Johnson (2), Patrick Cantlay (7) and Brooks Koepka (8) of the United States
- Sergio García (48) and Rafa Cabrera-Bello (140) of Spain
- Adam Scott (41) of Australia
- Bernd Wiesberger (54) of Austria
- Danny Lee (191) of New Zealand
- Louis Oosthuizen (12) of South Africa
- Martin Kaymer (99) and Stephan Jäger (114) of Germany
- Tyrrell Hatton (11), Matt Fitzpatrick (21) and Lee Westwood (27) of Great Britain
- Camilo Villegas (225) of Colombia
- Emiliano Grillo (74) of Argentina
- Victor Perez (37) of France
- Francesco Molinari (133) of Italy

Additionally, the Dutch Olympic Committee did not allow Joost Luiten (177) and Wil Besseling (221) to participate since they required their participants to be ranked in the top 100 of the world ranking.

Before the start of the competition, Bryson DeChambeau (6) tested positive for COVID-19 and was replaced on the US team by Patrick Reed. Jon Rahm (1) also withdrew following a positive test and was replaced by Jorge Campillo.

=== Women ===
The final rankings for the women's competition were released on 29 June 2021.

Rank	Name	Country	World Ranking
1	Nelly Korda	United States	1
2	Ko Jin-young	South Korea	2
3	Inbee Park	South Korea	3
4	Kim Sei-young	South Korea	4
5	Danielle Kang	United States	5
6	Kim Hyo-joo	South Korea	6
7	Brooke Henderson	Canada	7
8	Yuka Saso	Philippines	8
9	Lexi Thompson	United States	9
10	Lydia Ko	New Zealand	10
11	Nasa Hataoka	Japan	11
12	Patty Tavatanakit	Thailand	12
13	Jessica Korda	United States	13
14	Minjee Lee	Australia	14
15	Hannah Green	Australia	15
16	Shanshan Feng	China	19
17	Ariya Jutanugarn	Thailand	21
18	Sophia Popov	Germany	23
19	Mone Inami	Japan	27
20	Carlota Ciganda	Spain	32
21	Mel Reid	Great Britain	38
22	Anna Nordqvist	Sweden	49
23	Nanna Koerstz Madsen	Denmark	52
24	Céline Boutier	France	58
25	Leona Maguire	Ireland	60
26	Lin Xiyu	China	62
27	Gaby López	Mexico	64
28	Caroline Masson	Germany	68
29	Emily Kristine Pedersen	Denmark	69
30	Madelene Sagström	Sweden	72
31	Matilda Castren	Finland	74
32	Hsu Wei-ling	Chinese Taipei	78
33	Azahara Muñoz	Spain	84
34	Jodi Ewart Shadoff	Great Britain	86
35	Giulia Molinaro	Italy	98
36	Perrine Delacour	France	101
37	Stephanie Meadow	Ireland	122
38	Min Lee	Chinese Taipei	130
39	Anne van Dam (Note: Van Dam was allowed to compete by the Dutch Olympic Committee despite not meeting their qualification criteria on account of her ability to climb the rankings being hindered by restricted playing opportunities due to COVID-19 related measures.)	Netherlands	133
40	Alena Sharp	Canada	136
41	Kelly Tan	Malaysia	154
42	Albane Valenzuela	Switzerland	163
43	Bianca Pagdanganan	Philippines	165
44	Aditi Ashok	India	178
45	María Fassi	Mexico	180
46	Maria Fernanda Torres	Puerto Rico	185
47	Tiffany Chan	Hong Kong	218
48	Sanna Nuutinen	Finland	232
49	Klára Spilková	Czech Republic	276
50	Manon De Roey	Belgium	278
51	Christine Wolf	Austria	288
52	Pia Babnik	Slovenia	301
53	Mariajo Uribe	Colombia	306
54	Daniela Darquea	Ecuador	349
55	Magdalena Simmermacher	Argentina	399
56	Lucrezia Colombotto Rosso	Italy	405
57	Maha Haddioui	Morocco	418
58	Tonje Daffinrud	Norway	419
59	Kim Métraux	Switzerland	445
60	Diksha Dagar	India	454

The following women removed themselves from possible qualification (world ranking as of 28 June listed):

- Charley Hull (ranked 41) and Georgia Hall (51) of Great Britain
- Lee-Anne Pace (209) of South Africa
- Morgane Métraux (353) of Switzerland
- Ashleigh Buhai (86) of South Africa
- Marianne Skarpnord (265) of Norway

Two weeks before the competition, Paula Reto (420) of South Africa tested positive for COVID-19 and withdrew. She was replaced in the field by India's Diksha Dagar. Reto subsequently tested negative multiple times and could have played but for her prompt withdrawal in order to allow maximum time for a replacement to prepare.

== Qualification summary ==
The following summarized the NOC's qualified for the Olympic golf tournament with the amount of golfers qualified per country.

NOC	Men	Women	Total
Argentina		1	1
Australia	2	2	4
Austria	2	1	3
Belgium	2	1	3
Canada	2	2	4
Chile	2		2
China	2	2	4
Colombia	1	1	2
Czech Republic	1	1	2
Denmark	2	2	4
Ecuador		1	1
Finland	2	2	4
France	2	2	4
Germany	2	2	4
Great Britain	2	2	4
Hong Kong		1	1
India	2	2	4
Ireland	2	2	4
Italy	2	2	4
Japan	2	2	4
Malaysia	1	1	2
Mexico	2	2	4
Morocco		1	1
Netherlands		1	1
New Zealand	1	1	2
Norway	2	1	3
Paraguay	1		1
Philippines	1	2	3
Poland	1		1
Puerto Rico	1	1	2
Slovakia	1		1
Slovenia		1	1
South Africa	2		2
South Korea	2	4	6
Spain	2	2	4
Sweden	2	2	4
Switzerland		2	2
Chinese Taipei	1	2	3
Thailand	2	2	4
United States	4	4	8
Venezuela	1		1
Zimbabwe	1		1
Total: 42 NOCs	60	60	120
