= Xiamen Open =

Xiamen Open may refer to a number of sporting events contested in Xiamen:

- The Xiamen Open International, a women's golf tournament on the China LPGA Tour and the Ladies European Tour.
- The Xiamen Open (China Tour), a men's golf tournament on the China Tour.
- The Xiamen Open, a beach volleyball tournament, part of the FIVB Beach Volleyball World Tour.
