= 2013 LPGA of Korea Tour =

The 2013 LPGA of Korea Tour was the 36th season of the LPGA of Korea Tour, the professional golf tour for women operated by the Korea Ladies Professional Golf' Association. It consisted of 23 golf tournaments, 20 played in South Korea, two played in China, and one played in Taiwan. Jang Ha-na won three tournaments and was the leading money winner with earnings of ₩689,542,549.

== Schedule ==
The number in parentheses after winners' names show the player's total number wins in official money individual events on the LPGA of Korea Tour, including that event.

Date	Tournament	Host city	Prize fund (KRW)	Winner
Dec 16	Hyundai China Ladies Open	(China) Xiamen	US$400,000	(South Korea) Kim Hyo-joo (2)
Apr 14	Lotte Mart Women's Open	(South Korea) Jeju	500,000,000	(South Korea) Kim Sei-young (1)
Apr 21	Nexen-Saintnine Masters	(South Korea) Gimhae	500,000,000	(South Korea) Yang Soo-jin (5)
May 5	KG-Edaily Ladies Open	(South Korea) Anseong	500,000,000	(South Korea) Lee Mi-rim (3)
May 19	Woori Investment & Securities Ladies Championship	(South Korea) Yongin	500,000,000	(South Korea) Heo Yoon-kyung (1)
May 26	Doosan Match Play Championship	(South Korea) Chuncheon	500,000,000	(South Korea) Jang Ha-na (2)
Jun 2	E1 Charity Open	(South Korea) Icheon	600,000,000	(South Korea) Kim Bo-kyung (2)
Jun 9	Lotte Cantata Women's Open	(South Korea) Jeju	500,000,000	(South Korea) Kim Bo-kyung (3)
Jun 16	S-Oil Champions Invitational	(South Korea) Jeju	600,000,000	(South Korea) Byun Hyun-min (2)
Jun 23	**Kia Motors Korea Women's Open Championship**	(South Korea) Incheon	600,000,000	(South Korea) Chun In-gee (1)
Jul 7	Kumho Tire Women's Open	(China) Weihai	500,000,000	(South Korea) Kim Da-na (1)
Aug 18	Nefs Masterpiece	(South Korea) Hongcheon	600,000,000	(South Korea) Kim Ji-hyun2 (2)
Aug 25	MBN-KYJ Golf Ladies Open	(South Korea) Yangpyeong	500,000,000	(South Korea) Kim Ha-neul (8)
Sep 8	Hanwha Finance Classic	(South Korea) Taean	1,200,000,000	(South Korea) Kim Sei-young (2)
Sep 15	**MefLife KLPGA Championship**	(South Korea) Ansan	700,000,000	(South Korea) Kim Sei-young (3)
Sep 29	KDB Daewoo Securities Classic	(South Korea) Pyeongchang	600,000,000	(South Korea) Bae Hee-kyung (1)
Oct 6	Rush n Cash Classic	(South Korea) Yeoju	600,000,000	(South Korea) Jang Ha-na (3)
Oct 13	**Hite Jinro Championship**	(South Korea) Yeoju	600,000,000	(South Korea) Jang Ha-na (4)
Oct 20	LPGA KEB-HanaBank Championship	(South Korea) Incheon	US$1,900,000	(South Korea) Amy Yang (2)
Oct 27	**KB Financial Star Championship**	(South Korea) Incheon	700,000,000	(South Korea) Lee Seung-hyun (2)
Nov 10	ADT CAPS Championship	(South Korea) Busan	500,000,000	(South Korea) Choi Yoo-lim (1)
Nov 17	Chosun Ilbo Championship	(South Korea) Suncheon	500,000,000	(South Korea) Lee Min-young (1)

Events in bold are majors.

LPGA KEB-HanaBank Championship is co-sanctioned with LPGA Tour.
Kumho Tire Women's Open and Hyundai China Ladies Open are co-sanctioned with China LPGA Tour.
Swinging Skirts World Ladies Masters is co-sanctioned with Taiwan LPGA.
