= Ssu-Chia Cheng =

Taiwanese professional golfer

Personal information
- Nationality: Chinese Taipei
- Born: October 27, 1997 (age 29) Taipei, Taiwan
- Height: 5 ft 4 in (163 cm)

Career
- Sport: Golf
- Turned professional: 2015
- Current tour: LPGA Tour (joined 2016)
- Former tours: Ladies European Tour (joined 2015); Symetra Tour
- Professional wins: 6

Number of wins by tour
- Ladies European Tour: 1
- Ladies Asian Golf Tour: 3
- Epson Tour: 2
- Other: 1

Best results in LPGA major championships
- Chevron Championship: DNP
- Women's PGA C'ship: CUT: 2021, 2024
- U.S. Women's Open: CUT: 2016, 2018, 2021, 2024
- Women's British Open: T66: 2015
- Evian Championship: T55: 2015
Medal record
Youth Olympic Games
Silver medal – second place	2014 Nanjing	Girls' individual

Ssu-Chia Cheng (Chinese: 程思嘉; born 27 October 1997) is a Taiwanese professional golfer who plays on the LPGA Tour.

== Early life and amateur career ==
Cheng started playing golf at the age of 8 and as an amateur won four events on the Taiwan LPGA Tour, three of which were co-sanctioned by the Ladies Asian Golf Tour. She became the first amateur in Taiwan to capture three wins. She won her first Ladies European Tour event as an amateur at 17, the Xiamen Open International in Xiamen, China.

Starting in 2012 at the Sime Darby LPGA Malaysia, she also made nine career starts on the LPGA Tour as an amateur, with best finish a tie for 15th at the 2014 LPGA Taiwan Championship.

Cheng represented her country at the 2014 Asian Games in Incheon, South Korea, and the 2014 Summer Youth Olympics in Nanjing, China, winning the girls' individual silver at the latter.

== Professional career ==
Cheng turned professional at 18 and in 2015, her rookie season on the Ladies European Tour, she came close to defending her title at the Xiamen Open International, finishing runner-up. She was also T4 at the Sanya Ladies Open, and ended the season 14th on the Order of Merit.

In January 2016, she climbed into the top 100 in the Women's World Golf Rankings for the first time.

Cheng joined the LPGA Tour in 2016 where she made 7 cuts in 16 events, and finished 122nd in the ranking. Her best finish was T31 at the ShopRite LPGA Classic. She was a member of the Chinese Taipei team at the 2016 International Crown with a 2–2–0 record.

In 2017, she played 16 events and made only one cut, on home soil at the Swinging Skirts LPGA Taiwan Championship. Relegated to the Symetra Tour in 2018, she made 12 cuts in 19 starts with only one top-10 result, a T4 at the Island Resort Championship.

Cheng staged a turnaround in form in 2019, and made 21 cuts in 22 starts on the Symetra Tour with seven top-10 performances including her first win as a professional at the FireKeepers Casino Hotel Championship. She led the Symetra Tour with sub-par holes (260) and eagles (9), and was second in birdies (251). She ended the season fourth on the money list to earn LPGA membership for the 2020 season.

On the 2024 LPGA Tour, Cheng earned two top-10 finishes, including a career-best tied third at the Dana Open.

== Professional wins (6) ==
=== Ladies European Tour wins (1) ===
- 2014 Xiamen Open International (as an amateur)^

^Co-sanctioned by the China LPGA Tour.

=== Epson Tour wins (2) ===
- 2019 FireKeepers Casino Hotel Championship
- 2022 Island Resort Championship

=== China LPGA Tour wins (1) ===
- 2014 Xiamen Open International^

^Co-sanctioned by the Ladies European Tour.

=== Ladies Asian Golf Tour wins (3) ===
- 2013 Chung Cheng Ladies Open (as an amateur)^, Fubon Ladies Open (as an amateur)^
- 2014 Jing-Du Construction Charity Ladies Open (as an amateur)^

^Co-sanctioned by the Taiwan LPGA Tour.

== Results in LPGA majors ==
Results not in chronological order.

Tournament	2015	2016	2017	2018	2019	2020	2021	2022	2023	2024
ANA Inspiration										
U.S. Women's Open		CUT		CUT			CUT			CUT
Women's PGA Championship							CUT			CUT
The Evian Championship	T55					NT	CUT			
Women's British Open	T66						CUT			

Did not play

CUT = missed the half-way cut
NT = no tournament
"T" = tied

== Team appearances ==
Amateur

- Espirito Santo Trophy (representing Chinese Taipei): 2012, 2014

Professional

- International Crown (representing Chinese Taipei): 2016
