= Coates Golf Championship =

Women's professional golf tournament

Tournament information
- Location: Ocala, Florida, U.S.
- Established: 2015
- Course: Golden Ocala Golf Club
- Par: 72
- Length: 6,541 yards (5,981 m)
- Tour: LPGA Tour
- Format: Stroke play – 72 holes
- Prize fund: $1.5 million
- Month played: January/February
- Final year: 2016

Tournament record score
- Aggregate: 272 Choi Na-yeon (2015)
- To par: −16 Choi Na-yeon (2015)

Final champion
- (South Korea) Jang Ha-na

Location in the United States

The Coates Golf Championship was a women's professional golf tournament on the LPGA Tour. It debuted as the first event in 2015 and was played at Golden Ocala Golf Club, west of Ocala, Florida. The event was not included in the 2017 season of the LPGA Tour.

Choi Na-yeon won the inaugural tournament by one stroke over Jang Ha-na, Lydia Ko, and Jessica Korda. Ko moved to number one in the Women's World Golf Rankings with the runner-up finish.

== Winners ==
Year	Dates	Champion	Country	Winning score	To par	Margin of victory	Purse ($)	Winner's share ($)
2016	Feb 3–6	Jang Ha-na	South Korea	65-72-68-72=277	−11	2 strokes	1,500,000	225,000
2015	Jan 28–31	Choi Na-yeon	South Korea	68-70-66-68=272	−16	1 stroke	1,500,000	225,000

== Tournament records ==
Year	Player	Score	Round
2015	Jang Ha-na	65 (−7)	2nd
2015	Lydia Ko	65 (−7)	3rd
2015	Amy Yang	65 (−7)	3rd
2016	Jang Ha-na	65 (−7)	1st
