= Zeng Liqi =

Chinese professional golfer (born 2006)

Personal information
- Nationality: China
- Born: 24 May 2006 (age 20) Nanchang, Jiangxi, China
- Height: 164 cm (5 ft 5 in)

Career
- Sport: Golf
- Turned professional: 2022
- Current tours: LPGA Tour; Epson Tour; China LPGA Tour
- Professional wins: 4

Best results in LPGA major championships
- Chevron Championship: DNP
- Women's PGA C'ship: DNP
- U.S. Women's Open: T60: 2026
- Women's British Open: DNP
- Evian Championship: DNP

Zeng Liqi, also known as Liqi Zeng (Chinese: 曾莉棋, born 24 May 2006) is a Chinese professional golfer. A standout amateur player, Zeng joined the LPGA Tour in 2024 after winning four titles on the China LPGA Tour tour and successfully petitioning for a waiver of the tour's age requirements. Zeng currently plays on the LPGA Tour and the Epson Tour.

== Early life and amateur career ==
Zeng is from Nanchang, China.

Zeng first gained attention as an amateur player. In 2020, she won the Nanshan China Amateur Golf Championship and the Buick National Junior Classic. In 2021, she placed second in the Mitsubishi Heavy Industries Championship, after a playoff. In January 2022, Zeng won the China Amateur Golf Tour Finals. As an amateur player, Zeng qualified and played at the 2022 Augusta National Women's Amateur. She placed 30th. At the time of the tournament, she was ranked 30th on the World Amateur Golf Ranking, still age 15. Her highest ranking as an amateur player was 7th.

== Professional career ==
In May 2022 at age 16, she turned professional, joining the China LPGA Tour. During her rookie season, she won the Zhangjigang Shuangshan Challenge and the CGA Ladies Championship in successive tournaments."Zeng Clinches China LPGA Tour Order of Merit Crown". Asia-Pacific Golf Confederation. Asia-Pacific Golf Confederation. 7 January 2023. "largely on the strength of back-to-back wins at last month's CGA Ladies Championship and the Zhangjiagang Shuangshan Challenge in November." At the end of the season, Zeng was awarded the LPGA of China tour's Order of Merit title.

In 2023, Zeng earned her third China LPGA Tour title, winning the Beijing Women's Challenge. She celebrated her 17th birthday while competing in the tournament. The next month, Zeng won her fourth China LPGA Tour title, when she won the Golf Liquor Guangdong Women's Open by three strokes. With the win, she became the youngest player in the history of the China LPGA Tour to achieve four wins.

In 2023, Zeng petitioned LPGA Commissioner Mollie Marcoux to be granted a waiver for the minimum age requirements for participating in the LPGA Q-Series. Zeng joined the Epson Tour. In 2024, she earned LPGA Tour status and started her rookie season at 17 years old. In doing so, she became the youngest woman from China to earn a LPGA Tour card. During her rookie season, she participated in 18 LPGA Tour events, and had two top-20 finishes. Zeng finished the season 35th in the Q-Series ranking, and lost her tour card.

In 2024, Zeng was named brand ambassador for Li-Ning 1990.

In 2025, Zeng returned to the China LPGA Tour and Epson Tour. In March, she finished T3 at the Mitsubishi Electric Automation Women's Open.

== Amateur wins ==
- 2020 Buick National Junior Classic Leg 5, Nanshan China Amateur Golf Championship
- 2022 China Amateur Golf Tour Finals

== Professional wins (4) ==
=== China LPGA Tour wins (4) ===
- 2022 Zhangjiagang Shuangshan Challenge, CGA Laides Championship
- 2023 Beijing Women's Challenge, Golf Liquor Guangdong Women's Open
