= Golf at the 2010 Asian Games – Women's team =

Women's team at the 2010 Asian Games
- Venue: Dragon Lake Golf Club
- Date: 17 November 2010 – 20 November 2010
- Competitors: 29 from 10 nations

Medalists
gold medal	South Korea; Han Jung-eun, Kim Hyun-soo, Kim Ji-hee
silver medal	China; Li Jiayun, Lin Xiyu, Yan Jing
bronze medal	Chinese Taipei; Hsu Ke-hui, Liu Yi-chen, Yao Hsuan-yu

The women's team competition at the 2010 Asian Games in Guangzhou was held from 17 to 20 November 2010 at the Dragon Lake Golf Club.

== Schedule ==
All times are China Standard Time (UTC+08:00)

Date	Time	Event
Wednesday, 17 November 2010	07:00	First round
Thursday, 18 November 2010	07:00	Second round
Friday, 19 November 2010	07:00	Third round
Saturday, 20 November 2010	07:00	Fourth round

== Results ==
Rank	Team	Round				Total	To par
Rank	Team	1	2	3	4	Total	To par
1st place, gold medalist(s)	South Korea (KOR)	144	141	133	142	560	−16
	Han Jung-eun	74	~~71~~	68	~~76~~		
	Kim Hyun-soo	70	70	65	72		
	Kim Ji-hee	~~75~~	71	~~71~~	70		
2nd place, silver medalist(s)	China (CHN)	142	148	142	139	571	−5
	Li Jiayun	73	74	71	~~71~~		
	Lin Xiyu	~~75~~	74	71	70		
	Yan Jing	69	~~75~~	~~74~~	69		
3rd place, bronze medalist(s)	Chinese Taipei (TPE)	148	145	148	144	585	+9
	Hsu Ke-hui	~~80~~	74	75	71		
	Liu Yi-chen	73	~~76~~	73	~~73~~		
	Yao Hsuan-yu	75	71	~~79~~	73		
4	Japan (JPN)	149	149	143	145	586	+10
	Mami Fukuda	78	~~75~~	~~74~~	~~79~~		
	Mamiko Higa	71	74	72	74		
	Natsuka Hori	~~79~~	75	71	71		
4	Thailand (THA)	152	147	148	139	586	+10
	Ariya Jutanugarn	75	73	74	67		
	Jaruporn Palakawong	~~79~~	~~76~~	74	~~76~~		
	Thidapa Suwannapura	77	74	~~75~~	72		
6	Philippines (PHI)	157	149	146	149	601	+25
	Dottie Ardina	~~82~~	~~76~~	76	77		
	Chihiro Ikeda	79	75	70	72		
	Maria Piccio	78	74	~~79~~	~~78~~		
7	Malaysia (MAS)	158	152	152	151	613	+37
	Vivienne Chin	~~81~~	79	~~83~~	~~89~~		
	Iman Ahmad Nordin	81	~~82~~	79	75		
	Kelly Tan	77	73	73	76		
8	Hong Kong (HKG)	161	156	155	157	629	+53
	Tiffany Chan	78	76	77	79		
	Michelle Cheung	~~88~~	~~82~~	78	78		
	Stephanie Ho	83	80	~~82~~	~~82~~		
9	India (IND)	162	159	158	158	637	+61
	Shreya Ghei	80	~~81~~	78	79		
	Vani Kapoor	~~82~~	79	~~81~~	79		
	Gurbani Singh	82	80	80	~~81~~		
10	Vietnam (VIE)	193	171	185	181	730	+154
	Lưu Thị Việt Nga	106	97	96	97		
	Ngô Bảo Nghi	87	74	89	84		
