= Women's China Open =

Women's professional golf tournament

Tournament information
- Location: Shanghai, China
- Established: 2006
- Course: Enhance Anting Golf Club
- Par: 72
- Length: 6,517 yards (5,959 m)
- Tour(s): LPGA of Korea Tour (–2017); China LPGA Tour (2014–)
- Format: Stroke play – 54 holes
- Prize fund: ¥1,000,000
- Month played: December

Current champion
- (China) Pang Runzhi

The Women's China Open is a women's professional golf tournament in China sanctioned by the China LPGA Tour and formerly the LPGA of Korea Tour.

The tournament, which is China's national championship, debuted in 2006. Lin Xiyu became the first mainland winner in 2019.

== Winners ==
Dates	Host city	Winner	Prize fund (US$)	Ref
Women's China Open
17–19 Oct 2025	Shanghai	(China) Pang Runzhi	¥1,000,000	
Orient-China Women's Open
13–15 Dec 2024	Xiamen	(China) Ji Yuai	¥500,000	
Women's China Open
12–14 Dec 2023	Xiamen	(China) Lei Ye	¥500,000	
2020–2022: No tournament
Macalline Women's China Open
5–8 Dec 2019	Xiamen	(China) Lin Xiyu	300,000	
China Ladies Open
13–16 Dec 2018	Xiamen	(Chinese Taipei) Min Lee	¥2,100,000	
15–17 Dec 2017	Tournament canceled			
Hyundai China Ladies Open
16–18 Dec 2016	Qingyuan	(South Korea) Kim Hyo-joo	550,000	
12–14 Dec 2015	Haikou	(South Korea) Park Sung-hyun	550,000	
12–14 Dec 2014	Haikou	(South Korea) Kim Hyo-joo	550,000	
15 Dec 2013	Qingcheng	(South Korea) Jang Ha-na	400,000	
16 Dec 2012	Xiamen	(South Korea) Kim Hyo-joo	400,000	
16-18 Dec 2011	Xiamen	(South Korea) Kim Hye-youn	250,000	
17–19 Dec 2010	Xiamen	(South Korea) Kim Hye-youn	250,000	
Orient China Ladies Open
17–19 Dec 2009	Xiamen	(South Korea) Ryu So-yeon	250,000	
19–21 Dec 2008	Xiamen	(South Korea) Choi Hye-yong	250,000	
16 Dec 2007	Xiamen	(South Korea) Jiyai Shin	250,000	
19 Nov 2006	Xiamen	(South Korea) Jiyai Shin	200,000	
