= Prima Thammaraks =

Thai professional golfer

Personal information
- Nickname: Prim
- Nationality: Thailand
- Born: 12 January 1992 (age 34) Bangkok, Thailand
- Height: 173 cm (5 ft 8 in)

Career
- Sport: Golf
- College: Iowa State University
- Turned professional: 2014
- Current tour: Epson Tour
- Former tour: LPGA Tour
- Professional wins: 3

Number of wins by tour
- WPGA Tour of Australasia: 1
- Epson Tour: 1
- Other: 1

Best results in LPGA major championships
- Chevron Championship: DNP
- Women's PGA C'ship: DNP
- U.S. Women's Open: CUT: 2019
- Women's British Open: 72nd: 2017
- Evian Championship: DNP

Prima Thammaraks (Thai: พริมา ธรรมมารักษ์; born 12 January 1992) is a Thai professional golfer playing on the U.S.-based Epson Tour.

== Early life ==
Thammaraks was born on 12 January 1992. She started playing golf at the age of 8 years old. Hobbies include the classical guitar, drawing, and movies.

== Amateur career ==
From 2010 to 2014, Thammaraks played for the Iowa State Cyclones of the Iowa State University. She was named All-Big 12 First Team member three times from 2012 to 2014. She was also named Big 12 Scholar Athlete of the Year for women's golf following the 2013–14 season.

== Professional career ==
Thammaraks played on the China LPGA Tour and the Thai LPGA Tour in 2015. In December 2015, she finished tied for 26th at the final stage LPGA Qualifying Tournament to earn LPGA Tour membership for the 2016 season. On the 2016 LPGA Tour, she played eight events and made two cuts.

In 2017, Thammaraks captured her first professional win at the RACV Gold Coast Challenge on the ALPG Tour. She also claimed her first China LPGA Tour win at the Xiamen Orient Masters in September. She made the cut at the 2017 Women's British Open and finish in 72nd place.

In 2021, Thammaraks earned her first Symetra Tour victory at season finale Symetra Tour Championship. She carded a score of 22-under par 266 setting the 72-hole scoring record for the championship to win by two strokes.

== Professional wins (3) ==
=== Epson Tour wins (1) ===
No.	Date	Tournament	Winning score	To par	Margin of victory	Runner-up
1	10 Oct 2021	Symetra Tour Championship	69-63-69-65=266	−22	2 strokes	(United States) Casey Danielson

=== ALPG Tour wins (1) ===
No.	Date	Tournament	Winning score	To par	Margin of victory	Runner-up
1	4 Feb 2017	RACV Gold Coast Challenge	71-69-73=213	−6	1 stroke	(Australia) Sarah Jane Smith

=== China LPGA Tour wins (1) ===
- 2017 (1) Xiamen Orient Masters

== Results in LPGA majors ==
Results not in chronological order.

Tournament	2017	2018	2019	2020	2021
The Chevron Championship					
U.S. Women's Open			CUT		
Women's PGA Championship					
The Evian Championship				NT	
Women's British Open	72				CUT

Did not play

CUT = missed the half-way cut
NT = no tournament
"T" = tied
