= Singapore Ladies Masters =

Golf tournament held in Singapore

Tournament information
- Location: Singapore
- Established: 2023
- Course: Laguna National Golf Resort Club
- Par: 72
- Tour: China LPGA Tour
- Format: Stroke play
- Prize fund: US$100,000
- Month played: June

Tournament record score
- Aggregate: 206 Shannon Tan (a)
- To par: −10 as above

Current champion
- (China) Sui Xiang

The Singapore Ladies Masters is a professional golf tournament in Singapore, featured on the China LPGA Tour. It is held at Laguna National Golf Resort Club, and was first played in 2023.

== History ==
In July 2023, Shannon Tan won the inaugural tournament, while still an amateur. She became only the second Singaporean to win on the CLPGA after Amanda Tan won the 2017 Beijing Heritage.

Tan also became the first Singaporean golfer to win an international golf tournament since Mardan Mamat won the 2006 Singapore Masters.

== Winners ==
Year	Date	Winner	Winning score	Margin of victory	Runner-up	Ref
2026	14 Jun	(China) Sui Xiang	−7 (69-67-73=209)	1 stroke	(Philippines) Florence Yvon Bisera	
2024	16 Jun	(China) Pang Runzhi	−7 (71-66-72=209)	1 stroke	(China) Cai Danlin	
2023	9 Jul	(Singapore) Shannon Tan (a)	−10 (68-72-66=206)	1 stroke	(China) Ji Yu-ai	

== See also ==
- Singapore Ladies Open
