= Lee Mi-hyang =

South Korean professional golfer (born 1993)

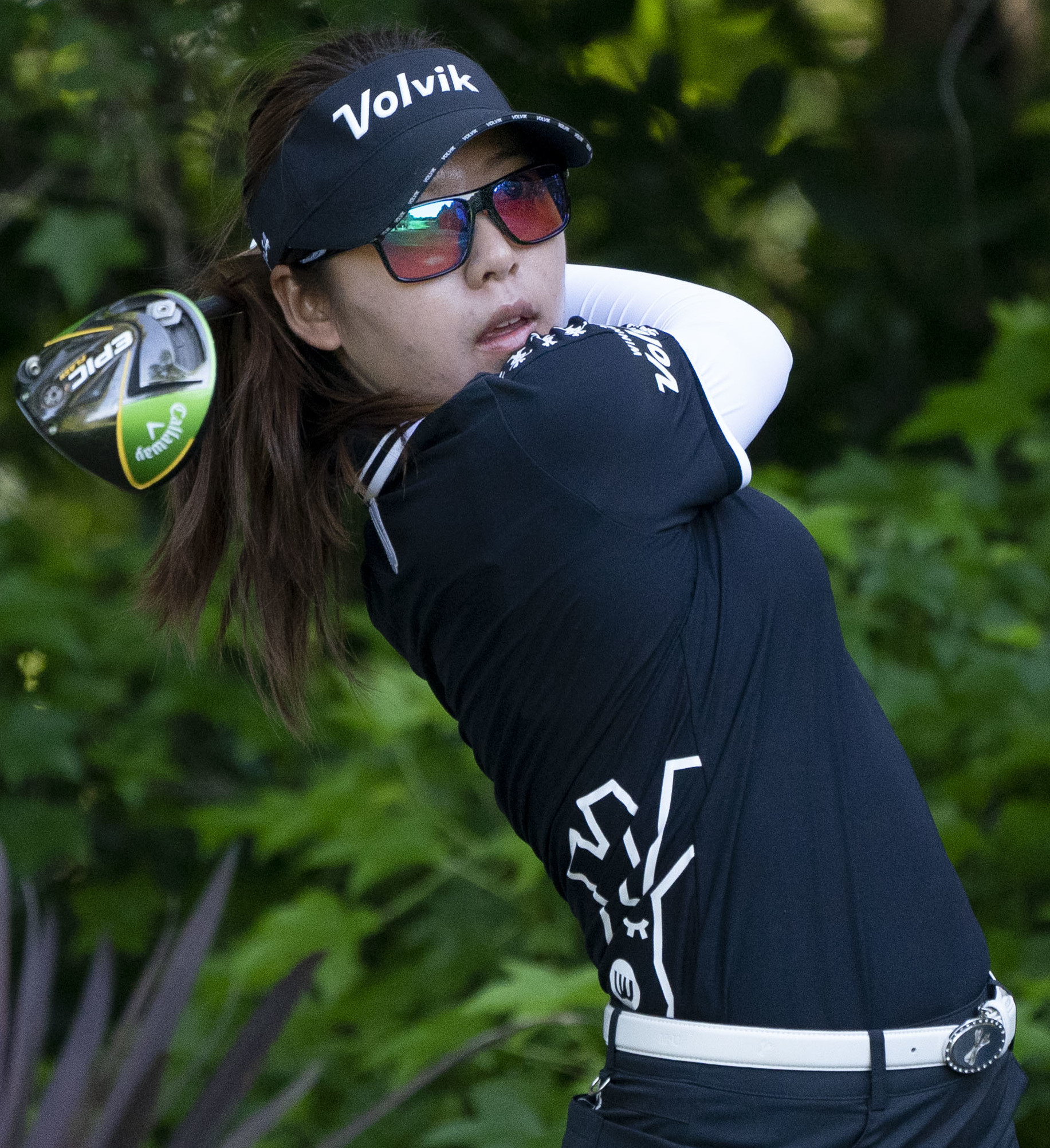

Personal information
- Nationality: South Korea
- Born: 30 March 1993 (age 33) Seoul, South Korea
- Height: 5 ft 3 in (1.60 m)

Career
- Sport: Golf
- Turned professional: 2011
- Current tours: LPGA Tour (2013–); Ladies European Tour (2014–)
- Former tour: Symetra Tour (2012)
- Professional wins: 5

Number of wins by tour
- LPGA Tour: 3
- Ladies European Tour: 2
- LPGA of Japan Tour: 1
- WPGA Tour of Australasia: 1
- Epson Tour: 1

Best results in LPGA major championships
- Chevron Championship: 2nd: 2019
- Women's PGA C'ship: T4: 2017
- U.S. Women's Open: T14: 2015
- Women's British Open: T11: 2016
- Evian Championship: T4: 2015

Achievements and awards
- Symetra Tour Rookie of the Year: 2012

Lee Mi-hyang (Korean: 이미향, born 30 March 1993), also known as Mi Hyang Lee, is a South Korean professional golfer.

== Career ==
In 2011, Lee turned professional. She earned her LPGA Tour card through qualifying school and played on both the LPGA Tour and Symetra Tour in 2012. Lee won the Symetra Classic on the Symetra Tour, finished 6th on the money list to retain her LPGA Tour card for 2013, and also won Symetra Tour Rookie of the Year honors. In 2013 on the LPGA Tour, she finished 92nd on the money list to maintain her card.

In 2014, she won the ISPS Handa New Zealand Women's Open in February, co-sanctioned by the Ladies European Tour and the ALPG Tour. In November, she won the Mizuno Classic, co-sanctioned by the LPGA Tour and the LPGA of Japan Tour.

== Awards and honors ==
In 2013, she was the Symetra Tour Rookie of the Year.

== Professional wins (5) ==
=== LPGA Tour wins (3) ===
No.	Date	Tournament	Winning score	To par	Margin of victory	Runners-up
1	9 Nov 2014	Mizuno Classic^	69-67-69=205	−11	Playoff	(Japan) Kotono Kozuma (South Korea) Ilhee Lee
2	30 Jul 2017	Aberdeen Asset Management Ladies Scottish Open	73-75-68-66=282	−6	1 stroke	(South Korea) Mi Jung Hur (Australia) Karrie Webb
3	8 Mar 2026	Blue Bay LPGA	67-66-71-73=277	−11	1 stroke	(China) Zhang Weiwei

^ co-sanctioned with LPGA of Japan Tour

LPGA Tour playoff record (1–0)

No.	Year	Tournament	Opponent	Result
1	2014	Mizuno Classic	(Japan) Kotono Kozuma (South Korea) Ilhee Lee	Won with birdie on fIfth extra hole

=== Ladies European Tour wins (2) ===
- 2014 ISPS Handa New Zealand Women's Open (co-sanctioned with ALPG Tour)
- 2017 Aberdeen Asset Management Ladies Scottish Open

=== Symetra Tour wins (1) ===
- 2012 Symetra Classic

== Results in LPGA majors ==
Results not in chronological order.

Tournament	2012	2013	2014	2015	2016	2017	2018	2019	2020
Chevron Championship			T16	T8	T36	CUT	CUT	2	T15
Women's PGA Championship		T64	CUT	T53	T26	T4	CUT	T71	CUT
U.S. Women's Open	CUT			T14	T32	T39	CUT	T30	T58
The Evian Championship ^		T19	T61	T4	CUT	9	T10	T17	NT
Women's British Open			CUT	T17	T11	T23	T28	CUT	T32

Tournament	2021	2022	2023	2024	2025	2026
Chevron Championship	T14	74	CUT	T72	T18	CUT
U.S. Women's Open	CUT			T16	CUT	CUT
Women's PGA Championship	WD		CUT	T41	T31	CUT
The Evian Championship	T73		T48	T51	T28	CUT
Women's British Open	CUT		CUT	T55	T50	T65

^ The Evian Championship was added as a major in 2013.

Top 10
Did not play

CUT = missed the half-way cut
WD = withdrew
NT = no tournament
"T" = tied

=== Summary ===
Tournament	Wins	2nd	3rd	Top-5	Top-10	Top-25	Events	Cuts made
Chevron Championship	0	1	0	1	2	6	13	9
U.S. Women's Open	0	0	0	0	0	2	11	6
Women's PGA Championship	0	0	0	1	1	1	13	7
The Evian Championship	0	0	0	1	3	5	12	10
Women's British Open	0	0	0	0	0	3	12	8
Totals	0	1	0	3	6	17	61	40

- Most consecutive cuts made – 10 (2014 Evian – 2016 British Open)
- Longest streak of top-10s – 2 (2018 Evian – 2019 ANA)
