= Min Lee (golfer) =

Taiwanese professional golfer

Personal information
- Nationality: Chinese Taipei
- Born: 3 June 1995 (age 31) Taipei, Taiwan

Career
- Sport: Golf
- Turned professional: 2012
- Current tours: Taiwan LPGA Tour; China LPGA Tour
- Former tours: LPGA Tour; Symetra Tour
- Professional wins: 10

Number of wins by tour
- Epson Tour: 3
- Other: 7

Best results in LPGA major championships
- Chevron Championship: CUT: 2016, 2022
- Women's PGA C'ship: T47: 2023
- U.S. Women's Open: T12: 2015
- Women's British Open: CUT: 2017
- Evian Championship: T29: 2015

Achievements and awards
- Symetra Tour Rookie of the Year: 2014

Min Lee (born 3 June 1995) is a Taiwanese professional golfer who plays on the LPGA Tour.

== Early life and amateur career ==
Lee started playing golf at the age of 12 years old and is a skilled pianist. She was a member of the Taiwan National Team and won two tournaments on the 2012 China Amateur Golf Tour, at Qinhuangdao and Chongqing.

== Professional career ==
Lee turned professional in 2012 and was Rookie of the Year on the 2014 Symetra Tour and finished 5th in the rankings, earning promotion to the LPGA Tour. In 2015, she finished T12 at the U.S. Women's Open and 68th on the LPGA Tour money list. In 2016, she dropped to 94th and in 2017 to 128th. In 2019, she was back on the Symetra Tour where she won the Valley Forge Invitational.

Lee has also won four tournaments on the Taiwan LPGA Tour and won the 2018 China Women's Open on the China LPGA Tour.

Lee spent 2020 home in Taiwan due to the COVID-19 pandemic. Back on the LPGA Tour in 2021, she was runner-up behind Matilda Castren at the 2021 LPGA Mediheal Championship, the week after she won the Mission Inn Resort & Club Championship on the Symetra Tour. These performances saw her rise to 119 in the Women's World Golf Rankings, which helped her qualify for the 2020 Summer Olympics in Tokyo.

== Professional wins (10) ==
=== Symetra Tour wins (3) ===
- 2014 Garden City Charity Classic
- 2019 Valley Forge Invitational
- 2021 Mission Inn Resort and Club Championship

=== China LPGA Tour wins (1) ===
- 2018 China Women's Open

=== Taiwan LPGA Tour wins (6) ===
- 2016 TLPGA Open
- 2017 Hitachi Ladies Classic
- 2018 Taiwan Mobile Ladies Open
- 2020 Party Golfers Ladies Open
- 2021 WPG Ladies Open
- 2025 WPG Ladies Open

== Results in LPGA majors ==
Results not in chronological order.

Tournament	2015	2016	2017	2018	2019	2020	2021	2022	2023
Chevron Championship		CUT						CUT	
Women's PGA Championship	T53	CUT	T68	CUT			CUT	CUT	T47
U.S. Women's Open	T12	CUT							
The Evian Championship	T29	CUT				NT	CUT		T61
Women's British Open			CUT						

Did not play

CUT = missed the half-way cut
NT = no tournament
"T" = tied
