= Xiamen Orient Masters =

Golf tournament on the China LPGA Tour

Coordinates: 24.2847°N 118.0521°E

Tournament information
- Location: Xiamen, China
- Established: 2014
- Courses: Xiamen Orient Golf & Country Club
- Par: 72
- Tours: China LPGA Tour; Ladies European Tour (2014–2016)
- Format: Stroke play
- Prize fund: 500,000 RMB
- Month played: September

Tournament record score
- Aggregate: 271 Anne van Dam (2016)
- To par: −17 as above

Current champion
- (China) Yin Ruoning

Location in China

The Xiamen Orient Masters is a golf tournament on the China LPGA Tour. From 2014 to 2016 it was co-sanctioned by the Ladies European Tour and played as the Xiamen International Ladies Open. It is played at the Xiamen Orient Golf & Country Club in Xiamen, China.

== Winners ==
Year	Winner	Country	Score	Runner(s)-up
Mitsubishi Heavy Industries Orient Masters
2020	Yin Ruoning	China	206 (−10)	Zhang Weiwei
2019	Ami Hirai	Japan	205 (−11)	Hwang Ye-nah; Aretha Pan
2018	Lee Solar	South Korea	209 (−7)	Huang Ching
Xiamen Orient Masters
2017	Prima Thammaraks	Thailand	209 (−7)	Chung Ye-na; Jang So-young
Xiamen International Ladies Open
2016	Anne van Dam	Netherlands	271 (−17)	Yuting Shi
2015	Hye In-yeom	South Korea	272 (−16)	Ssu-Chia Cheng
Xiamen Open International
2014	Ssu-Chia Cheng	Chinese Taipei	206 (−10)	Marion Ricordeau
