= Perrine Delacour =

French professional golfer (born 1994)

Personal information
- Nationality: France
- Born: 5 April 1994 (age 32) Laon, France
- Height: 5 ft 8 in (173 cm)

Career
- Sport: Golf
- Turned professional: 2012
- Current tours: LPGA Tour (joined 2014); Ladies European Tour (joined 2024)
- Former tour: Symetra Tour (joined 2013)
- Professional wins: 4

Number of wins by tour
- Ladies European Tour: 2
- Epson Tour: 2

Best results in LPGA major championships
- Chevron Championship: T30: 2020
- Women's PGA C'ship: T11: 2023
- U.S. Women's Open: T33: 2023
- Women's British Open: T21: 2023
- Evian Championship: T21: 2025

Achievements and awards
- Symetra Tour Player of the Year: 2019
Medal record
Mediterranean Games
Silver medal – second place	2009 Pescara	Women's team

Perrine Delacour (born 5 April 1994) is a French professional golfer playing on the LPGA Tour and Ladies European Tour.

== Amateur career ==
Delacour started playing golf at the age of 8 and won the 2009 Girls Amateur Championship at West Lancs. After winning the 2011 French International Ladies Amateur Championship at 17 years of age, Delacour was a member of the French team winning the 2011 European Girls' Team Championship at Is Molas Golf Club in Sardinia, Italy.

The year after, she reached the semi-finals of the 2012 British Ladies Amateur alongside Georgia Hall at Carnoustie, and was part of the French team at the 2012 Espirito Santo Trophy teamed with Shannon Aubert and Céline Boutier.

She was one of four amateurs to earn LPGA Tour status at Final Stage of Q-School in 2012.

== Professional career ==
Delacour turned professional in December 2012 and joined the Symetra Tour in 2013, where she was runner-up at the Eagle Classic and the Symetra Tour Championship. She finished eighth in the Symetra Tour rankings to gain full exemption for the 2014 LPGA Tour.

She played full time on the LPGA Tour between 2014 and 2018, and her best finish in 2014 was T15 at the Women's Australian Open, in 2015 it was a 4th at the Kingsmill Championship, and in 2017 a tie for 7th at the Manulife LPGA Classic. Delacour set a tournament record at the 2017 Manulife LPGA Classic with a career low round of 62 (−10).

For 2019 she dropped down to the Symetra Tour. Ten top-10 finishes, including wins at the Four Winds Invitational and Prasco Charity Championship, helped her win the Symetra Tour Player of the Year and earn promotion to the 2020 LPGA Tour, where she finished 3rd at the Women's Australian Open.

She qualified for the 2020 Tokyo Olympics along with Céline Boutier where she finished T29. At the 2024 Paris Olympics she finished T42.

In 2023, Delacour rose into the top-75 on the Women's World Golf Rankings for the first time. She also earned Ladies European Tour status at Q-School in 2023 to share her time between the two tours, and won the 2024 Dormy Open Helsingborg and 2025 Investec South African Women's Open.

== Amateur wins ==
- 2009 Girls Amateur Championship
- 2011 Irish Under 18 Open Stroke Play, French International Ladies Amateur Championship

== Professional wins (4) ==
=== Ladies European Tour wins (2) ===
No.	Date	Tournament	Winning score	To par	Margin of victory	Runner-up
1	2 Jun 2024	Dormy Open Helsingborg	68-70-67=205	–11	Playoff	(Germany) Helen Briem (a)
2	13 Apr 2025	Investec South African Women's Open	65-69-70-70=274	–14	2 strokes	(South Africa) Casandra Alexander

Ladies European Tour playoff record (1–0)

No.	Year	Tournament	Opponent	Result
1	2024	Dormy Open Helsingborg	(Germany) Helen Briem (a)	Won with birdie on first extra hole

=== Symetra Tour wins (2) ===
No.	Date	Tournament	Winning score	Margin of victory	Runner-up
1	9 Jun 2019	Four Winds Invitational	−9 (75-65-67=207)	2 strokes	(United States) Jillian Hollis
2	30 Jun 2019	Prasco Charity Championship	−15 (70-64-67=201)	7 strokes	(Thailand) Patty Tavatanakit

== Results in LPGA majors ==
Results not in chronological order.

Tournament	2015	2016	2017	2018	2019	2020	2021	2022	2023	2024	2025	2026
Chevron Championship						T30	CUT	T63	CUT	CUT		T45
U.S. Women's Open						T40			T33			
Women's PGA Championship	T49		CUT	T68		T58	T46	CUT	T11	CUT		T24
The Evian Championship			CUT			NT	CUT	T54	CUT	T49	T21	T50
Women's British Open						T39	T34	CUT	T21	CUT	T63	CUT

Did not play

CUT = missed the half-way cut
NT = no tournament
T = tied

=== Summary ===
Tournament	Wins	2nd	3rd	Top-5	Top-10	Top-25	Events	Cuts made
Chevron Championship	0	0	0	0	0	0	6	3
U.S. Women's Open	0	0	0	0	0	0	2	2
Women's PGA Championship	0	0	0	0	0	2	9	6
The Evian Championship	0	0	0	0	0	1	7	4
Women's British Open	0	0	0	0	0	1	7	4
Totals	0	0	0	0	0	4	31	19

- Most consecutive cuts made – 5 (twice)

== LPGA Tour career summary ==
Year	Tournaments played	Cuts made*	Wins	2nds	3rds	Top 10s	Best finish	Earnings ($)	Money list rank	Scoring average	Scoring rank
2013	1	0	0	0	0	0	MC	0	n/a	75.50	n/a
2014	11	5	0	0	0	0	T15	40,877	123	72.72	101
2015	11	5	0	0	0	1	4	105,048	86	72.87	99
2016	5	2	0	0	0	0	T45	9,736	161	72.86	n/a
2017	20	7	0	0	0	1	T7	98,261	100	72.38	118
2018	20	13	0	0	0	0	T32	72,418	112	72.36	107
2019	Did not play										
2020	14	12	0	0	1	1	3	260,737	42	71.96	67
2021	21	14	0	0	0	1	4	285,889	66	70.92	45
2022	18	12	0	0	0	0	T13	166,256	101	71.40	73
2023	23	20	0	0	0	1	9	616,966	44	71.25	59
2024	21	10	0	0	0	0	T18	178,403	105	71.98	98
2025	12	7	0	0	0	0	T21	175,045	112	71.55	74
Totals^	177	107	0	0	1	5	3	2,009,636	223		

^ Official as of 2025 season
* Includes matchplay and other tournaments without a cut.

== World ranking ==
Position in Women's World Golf Rankings at the end of each calendar year.

Year	World ranking	Source
2013	429	
2014	370	
2015	178	
2016	345	
2017	267	
2018	290	
2019	262	
2020	103	
2021	109	
2022	178	
2023	78	
2024	117	
2025	120	

== Team appearances ==
- European Girls' Team Championship (representing France): 2011 (winners), 2012
- Espirito Santo Trophy (representing France): 2012
