= Shannon Tan =

Singapore professional golfer (born 2004)

Personal information
- Full name: Shannon Tan
- Nationality: Singapore
- Born: 9 April 2004 (age 22) Singapore
- Height: 168 cm (5 ft 6 in)

Career
- Sport: Golf
- College: Texas Tech University
- Turned professional: 2024
- Current tour: Ladies European Tour (joined 2024)
- Professional wins: 4

Number of wins by tour
- Ladies European Tour: 3
- Other: 1

Best results in LPGA major championships
- Chevron Championship: T38: 2026
- Women's PGA C'ship: T32: 2026
- U.S. Women's Open: DNP
- Women's British Open: T6: 2026
- Evian Championship: T16: 2026

Achievements and awards
- Ladies European Tour Order of Merit winner: 2025
- Ladies European Tour Player of the Year: 2025

Shannon Tan (born 9 April 2004) is a Singaporean professional golfer and Ladies European Tour player. She won the 2025 Ladies European Tour Order of Merit.

== Early life and amateur career ==
Tan was introduced to golf by her father when she was five. When she was 14, her parents quit their jobs and moved the family to Australia to support her golf development. In 2018, she triumphed at the Tasmanian Amateur Championship, defeating Isabelle Simpson, 9 and 8, in the final. She represented Singapore at the 2018 Espirito Santo Trophy and at the Queen Sirikit Cup (the Asia-Pacific Amateur Ladies Golf Team Championship) between 2018 and 2022, where she was individual runner-up in 2021, a stroke behind Mizuki Hashimoto.

Tan attended Charters Towers State High School in Queensland, Australia before enrolling at Texas Tech University in the fall of 2022, to start playing with the Texas Tech Red Raiders women's golf team. She closed out her freshman year by finishing tied-fourth at the NCAA Division I regionals.

In July 2023, Tan won the Singapore Ladies Masters at Laguna National, a China LPGA Tour event, while still an amateur. She became only the second Singaporean to win on the CLPGA after Amanda Tan won the 2017 Beijing Heritage.

== Professional career ==
Tan turned professional in January 2024 after she earned her card for the Ladies European Tour (LET) by finishing tied 8th at Q-School, the first Singaporean to earn an LET card.

In January, she was runner-up at the Webex Players Series Murray River, two strokes behind Kazuma Kobori in her professional debut. In February, she won the Magical Kenya Ladies Open in her LET debut. By April, she had climbed into the top-200 on the Women's World Golf Rankings for the first time, and a year later into the top-100, after runner-up finishes at the 2024 Hero Women's Indian Open and 2025 Jabra Ladies Open, and 3rd place finishes at the 2024 Ladies Italian Open and 2025 Lalla Meryem Cup.

Tan captured her second LET title after winning the Amundi German Masters by a single stroke ahead of Helen Briem in June 2025. After also winning the Hero Women's Indian Open in October, she led the final 2025 Ladies European Tour Order of Merit ranking, becoming the first player from Singapore to do so.

In August 2026, Tan finished tied for sixth at the Women's British Open with a one under par total of 283. It was her best finish at a major championship and the best result by a Singaporean golfer at a women's major. She closed with a two under par round of 69 and finished four strokes behind winner Shiho Kuwaki.

== Amateur wins ==
- 2018 Tasmanian Amateur Championship
- 2020 EFG Singapore Junior Masters, SGA 4th National Ranking Game
- 2021 Singapore Junior Development Tour Ranking Series 2, Singapore Junior Masters Spring Tournament, LLDSports International Invitational Series, CarTimes Singapore Junior Development Tour Championship, Singapore Junior Development Tour International Series, EFG Singapore Junior Masters

== Professional wins (4) ==
=== Ladies European Tour (3) ===
No.	Date	Tournament	Winning score	To par	Margin of victory	Runner-up
1	11 Feb 2024	Magical Kenya Ladies Open	73-70-67-70=280	−12	4 strokes	(Italy) Alessandra Fanali
2	29 Jun 2025	Amundi German Masters	70-69-68-76=283	−9	1 stroke	(Germany) Helen Briem
3	12 Oct 2025	Hero Women's Indian Open	68-73-73-67=281	−7	1 stroke	(England) Alice Hewson

=== China LPGA Tour (1) ===
No.	Date	Tournament	Winning score	To par	Margin of victory	Runner-up
1	9 Jul 2023	Singapore Ladies Masters (as an amateur)	68-72-66=206	−10	1 stroke	(China) Ji Yu-ai

== Results in LPGA majors ==
Tournament	2024	2025	2026
Chevron Championship			T38
U.S. Women's Open			
Women's PGA Championship			T32
The Evian Championship	CUT	T59	T16
Women's British Open	T60	T40	T6

Top 10
Did not play

CUT = missed the half-way cut
T = tied

== Team appearances ==
- Espirito Santo Trophy (representing Singapore): 2018
- Queen Sirikit Cup (representing Singapore): 2018, 2019, 2021, 2022
- Patsy Hankins Trophy (representing Asia/Pacific): 2023
