= Reignwood LPGA Classic =

Golf tournament formerly on the LPGA Tour

Coordinates: 40.203°N 116.122°E

Tournament information
- Location: Changping District, Beijing, China
- Established: 2013
- Course: Pine Valley Golf Club
- Par: 73
- Length: 6,596 yards (6,031 m)
- Tour: LPGA Tour
- Format: Stroke play - 72 holes
- Prize fund: $2.1 million
- Month played: October
- Final year: 2016

Tournament record score
- Aggregate: 266 Shanshan Feng (2013)
- To par: −26 as above

Final champion
- (South Korea) Kim In-kyung

Location in China

The Reignwood LPGA Classic was a women's professional golf tournament in China on the LPGA Tour. It debuted in October 2013 at Pine Valley Golf Club in the Changping District, a suburban area northwest of central Beijing.

Shanshan Feng won the inaugural event with an eagle on the final hole to win by a stroke over runner-up Stacy Lewis.

In 2017, the tournament name changed to Alisports LPGA before being canceled.

== Winners ==
Year	Dates	Champion	Country	Winning score	To par	Margin of victory	Purse ($)	Winner's share ($)
2017	Tournament canceled							
2016	29 Sep – 2 Oct	Kim In-kyung	South Korea	70-64-68-66=268	−24	1 stroke	2,100,000	315,000
2015	No tournament							
2014	2–5 Oct	Mirim Lee	South Korea	70-68-70-69=277	−15	2 strokes	2,100,000	315,000
2013	3–6 Oct	Shanshan Feng	China	70-64-64-68=266	−26	1 stroke	1,800,000	270,000

== Tournament records ==
Year	Player	Score	Round
2016	Mi Jung Hur	63 (−10)	2nd
