= Lin Xiyu =

Chinese professional golfer (born 1996)

Lin Xiyu (林希妤)
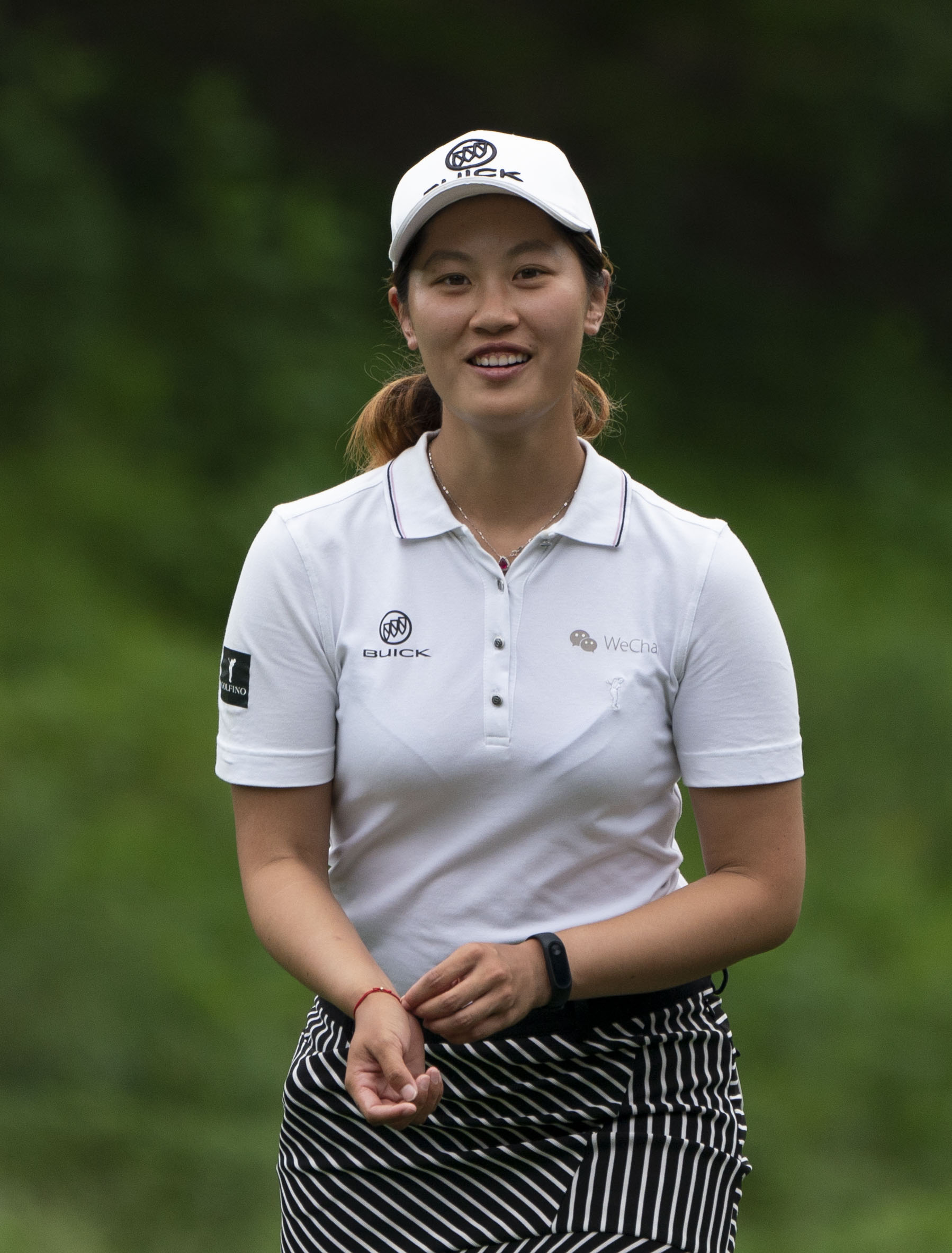
- Lin in 2018

Personal information
- Nationality: China
- Born: 25 February 1996 (age 30) Guangzhou, China
- Height: 5 ft 6 in (168 cm)

Career
- Sport: Golf
- Turned professional: 2011
- Current tours: LPGA Tour (2014–); Ladies European Tour (2013–); China LPGA Tour (2011–)
- Professional wins: 9

Number of wins by tour
- Ladies European Tour: 3
- Ladies Asian Golf Tour: 2
- WPGA Tour of Australasia: 1
- Other: 5

Best results in LPGA major championships
- Chevron Championship: T13: 2024
- Women's PGA C'ship: T3: 2023
- U.S. Women's Open: T7: 2021
- Women's British Open: T17: 2013
- Evian Championship: T29: 2015
Medal record
Women's golf
Representing China
Olympic Games
Bronze medal – third place	2024 Paris	Individual
Asian Games
Silver medal – second place	2010 Guangzhou	Team
Bronze medal – third place	2022 Hangzhou	Team

Lin Xiyu (Chinese: 林希妤; born 25 February 1996), also known as Xi Yu Lin and by her English name Janet, is a Chinese professional golfer who plays on the LPGA Tour. She won the bronze medal at the 2024 Summer Olympics.

== Professional career ==
Lin turned professional in 2011 and began playing on the China LPGA Tour, where she has won seven times. She began playing on the Ladies European Tour in 2013 and won the Sanya Ladies Open back to back in 2014 and 2015.

Lin began playing on the LPGA Tour in 2014 and finished tied 5th at the 2015 Blue Bay LPGA. She has made multiple holes-in-one on the LPGA Tour and has lost two playoffs.

Lin competed at the 2016 Summer Olympics, finishing 38th.

In 2023, Lin won the individual title at the weather-shortened Aramco Team Series event at Hong Kong Golf Club in a playoff against Ko Jin-young.

Lin competed at the 2024 Summer Olympics, winning the bronze medal.

== Professional wins (9) ==
=== Ladies European Tour wins (3) ===
No.	Date	Tournament	Winning score	To par	Margin of victory	Runner(s)-up
1	16 Nov 2014	Sanya Ladies Open^	68-67-67=202	−14	5 strokes	(England) Charley Hull
2	8 Nov 2015	Sanya Ladies Open^ (2)	70-68-65=203	−13	2 strokes	(China) Yan Jing
3	8 Oct 2023	Aramco Team Series – Hong Kong	69-66=135	−11	Playoff	(South Korea) Ko Jin-young

Ladies European Tour playoff record (1–0)

No.	Year	Tournament	Opponent(s)	Result
1	2023	Aramco Team Series – Hong Kong	(South Korea) Ko Jin-young	Won with birdie on second extra hole

=== China LPGA Tour wins (7) ===
- 2012 (2) Tian Jing Challenge; Srixon XXIO Ladies Open
- 2013 (1) Sanya's Hills Ladies Classic
- 2014 (2) Sanya's Hills Ladies Classic; Sanya Ladies Open^
- 2015 (1) Sanya Ladies Open^
- 2019 (1) Macalline Women's China Open

^ Co-sanctioned by Ladies European Tour, Ladies Asian Golf Tour and China LPGA Tour.

=== ALPG Tour wins (1) ===
- 2018 ALPG Ballarat Icons Pro Am

== Playoff record ==
LPGA Tour playoff record (0–2)

No.	Year	Tournament	Opponent(s)	Result
1	2022	Honda LPGA Thailand	(Denmark) Nanna Koerstz Madsen	Lost to eagle on second extra hole
2	2023	JM Eagle LA Championship	(Australia) Hannah Green (India) Aditi Ashok	Green won with par on second extra hole

== Results in LPGA majors ==
Results not in chronological order.

Tournament	2011	2012	2013	2014	2015	2016	2017	2018	2019	2020
Chevron Championship					WD	T45	CUT		T35	
Women's PGA Championship					CUT	CUT	CUT	CUT	T43	T48
U.S. Women's Open	CUT				CUT	T26	CUT	CUT		CUT
The Evian Championship^			CUT	CUT	T29	T30			T37	NT
Women's British Open			T17	T62	T61	CUT		CUT	T51	CUT

Tournament	2021	2022	2023	2024	2025	2026
Chevron Championship	T36	T17	T14	T13	CUT	
U.S. Women's Open	T7	T11	T13	T29		T28
Women's PGA Championship	T9	T46	T3	T30		
The Evian Championship		T37	CUT			
Women's British Open		T28	T21	T55		

^ The Evian Championship was added as a major in 2013

Top 10
Did not play

LA = Low amateur
CUT = missed the half-way cut
NT = no tournament
"T" = tied

=== Summary ===
Tournament	Wins	2nd	3rd	Top-5	Top-10	Top-25	Events	Cuts made
Chevron Championship	0	0	0	0	0	3	9	6
U.S. Women's Open	0	0	0	0	1	3	11	6
Women's PGA Championship	0	0	1	1	2	2	10	6
The Evian Championship	0	0	0	0	0	0	8	4
Women's British Open	0	0	0	0	0	2	10	7
Totals	0	0	1	1	3	10	48	29

- Most consecutive cuts made – 11 (2021 Chevron – 2023 U.S. Women's Open)
- Longest streak of top-10s – 2 (2021 U.S. Women's Open – 2021 Women's PGA)

== World ranking ==
Position in Women's World Golf Rankings at the end of each calendar year.

Year	World ranking	Source
2012	347	
2013	194	
2014	80	
2015	53	
2016	76	
2017	174	
2018	256	
2019	123	
2020	98	
2021	57	
2022	15	
2023	10	
2024	22	
2025	174	

== Team appearances ==
Professional

- International Crown (representing China): 2016, 2023
