= Mirim Lee =

South Korean professional golfer (born 1990)

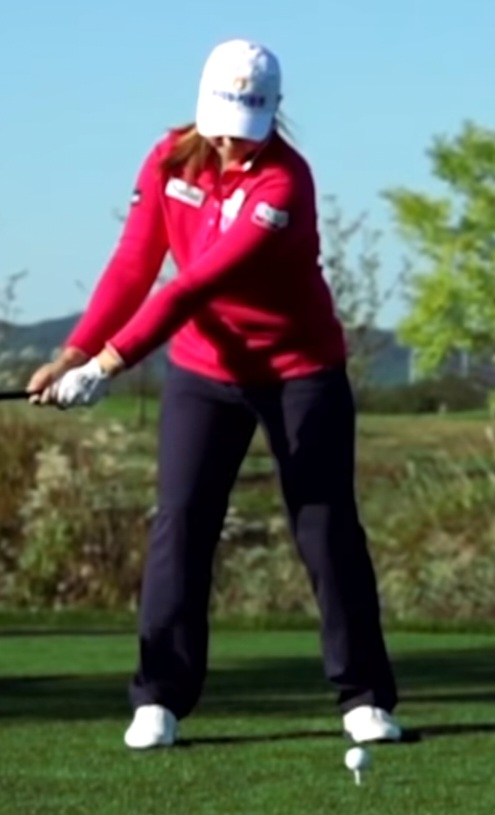

Personal information
- Nationality: South Korea
- Born: 25 October 1990 (age 36)
- Height: 5 ft 6 in (1.68 m)

Career
- Sport: Golf
- Turned professional: 2009
- Former tours: LPGA of Korea Tour; LPGA Tour
- Professional wins: 8

Number of wins by tour
- LPGA Tour: 4
- LPGA of Korea Tour: 3
- Ladies Asian Golf Tour: 1

Best results in LPGA major championships (wins: 1)
- Chevron Championship: Won: 2020
- Women's PGA C'ship: T4: 2016
- U.S. Women's Open: T8: 2017
- Women's British Open: T2: 2016
- Evian Championship: T13: 2019

Mirim Lee (born 25 October 1990), also known as Lee Mi-rim, is a South Korean professional golfer.

== Career ==
In 2009, Lee turned professional. She played on the LPGA of Korea Tour since 2010 and won three events on that tour.

In 2014, Lee began playing on the U.S.-based LPGA Tour and has won four tournaments, including one major, the 2020 ANA Inspiration. In the first round of the 2016 Women's British Open, Lee tied the low-round record in a Women's British Open of 62.

== Professional wins (8) ==
=== LPGA Tour wins (4) ===
Legend
Major championships (1)
Other LPGA Tour (3)

| No. | Date | Tournament | Winning score | To par | Margin of victory | Runner(s)-up | Winner's share ($) |
|---|---|---|---|---|---|---|---|
| 1 | 10 Aug 2014 | Meijer LPGA Classic | 70-64-67-69=270 | −14 | Playoff | (South Korea) Inbee Park | 225,000 |
| 2 | 5 Oct 2014 | Reignwood LPGA Classic | 70-68-70-69=277 | −15 | 2 strokes | (Sweden) Caroline Hedwall | 315,000 |
| 3 | 26 Mar 2017 | Kia Classic | 68-68-67-65=268 | −20 | 6 strokes | (United States) Austin Ernst (South Korea) Ryu So-yeon | 270,000 |
| 4 | 13 Sep 2020 | ANA Inspiration | 70-65-71-67=273 | −15 | Playoff | (Canada) Brooke Henderson (United States) Nelly Korda | 465,000 |

LPGA Tour playoff record (2–1)

| No. | Year | Tournament | Opponent(s) | Result |
|---|---|---|---|---|
| 1 | 2014 | Meijer LPGA Classic | (South Korea) Inbee Park | Won with birdie on second extra hole |
| 2 | 2016 | Marathon Classic | (Thailand) Ariya Jutanugarn (New Zealand) Lydia Ko | Ko won with birdie on fourth extra hole |
| 3 | 2020 | ANA Inspiration | (Canada) Brooke Henderson (United States) Nelly Korda | Won with birdie on first extra hole |

=== LPGA of Korea Tour wins (3) ===
| No. | Date | Tournament | Winning score | To par | Margin of victory | Runner(s)-up |
|---|---|---|---|---|---|---|
| 1 | 19 Jun 2011 | S-Oil Champions Invitational | 67-69-64=200 | −16 | 3 strokes | (South Korea) Kim Bo-kyung |
| 2 | 26 Aug 2012 | Kia Motors Korea Women's Open | 70-72-71-68=281 | −7 | 2 strokes | (South Korea) Kim Hye-youn (South Korea) Kim Ha-neul |
| 3 | 5 May 2013 | KG-Edaily Ladies Open | 72-68-69=209 | −7 | 1 stroke | (South Korea) Kim Hyo-joo (South Korea) Jang Ha-na |

=== Ladies Asian Golf Tour wins (1) ===
| No. | Date | Tournament | Winning score | To par | Margin of victory | Runner-up |
|---|---|---|---|---|---|---|
| 1 | 8 Jan 2011 | TLPGA & Royal Open | 77-67-69=213 | −3 | 1 stroke | (South Korea) Lim Ji-na |

== Major championships ==
=== Wins (1) ===
| Year | Championship | 54 holes | Winning score | Margin | Runners-up |
|---|---|---|---|---|---|
| 2020 | ANA Inspiration | 2 shot deficit | −15 (70-65-71-67=273) | Playoff^{1} | (Canada) Brooke Henderson, (United States) Nelly Korda |

^{1} Defeated Henderson and Korda in a sudden-death playoff: Lee (4), Henderson (5) and Korda (5).

=== Results timeline ===
Results not in chronological order.

| Tournament | 2014 | 2015 | 2016 | 2017 | 2018 | 2019 | 2020 |
|---|---|---|---|---|---|---|---|
| Chevron Championship | T26 | T11 | CUT | T14 | T30 | CUT | 1 |
| U.S. Women's Open | | T47 | T11 | T8 | CUT | CUT | CUT |
| Women's PGA Championship | T6 | T26 | T4 | T54 | T63 | T7 | WD |
| The Evian Championship | T50 | T20 | CUT | CUT | CUT | T13 | NT |
| Women's British Open | CUT | | T2 | CUT | CUT | T44 | |

| Tournament | 2021 | 2022 | 2023 | 2024 | 2025 |
|---|---|---|---|---|---|
| Chevron Championship | T10 | CUT | | | |
| U.S. Women's Open | CUT | CUT | CUT | | |
| Women's PGA Championship | CUT | T50 | | | CUT |
| The Evian Championship | CUT | | | | |
| Women's British Open | | | | | |

Win
Top 10
Did not play

CUT = missed the half-way cut
NT = no tournament
WD = withdrew
T = tied

=== Summary ===
| Tournament | Wins | 2nd | 3rd | Top-5 | Top-10 | Top-25 | Events | Cuts made |
|---|---|---|---|---|---|---|---|---|
| Chevron Championship | 1 | 0 | 0 | 1 | 2 | 4 | 9 | 6 |
| U.S. Women's Open | 0 | 0 | 0 | 0 | 1 | 2 | 9 | 3 |
| Women's PGA Championship | 0 | 0 | 0 | 1 | 3 | 3 | 10 | 7 |
| The Evian Championship | 0 | 0 | 0 | 0 | 0 | 2 | 7 | 3 |
| Women's British Open | 0 | 1 | 0 | 1 | 1 | 1 | 5 | 2 |
| Totals | 1 | 1 | 0 | 3 | 7 | 12 | 40 | 21 |

- Most consecutive cuts made – 6 (2014 WPC – 2015 Evian)
- Longest streak of top-10s – 1 (six times)
