= Blue Bay LPGA =

Women's professional golf tournament

Coordinates: 18.419°N 109.952°E

Tournament information
- Location: Lingshui Li Autonomous County, Hainan Island, China
- Established: 2014
- Courses: Jian Lake Blue Bay; Golf Course
- Par: 72
- Length: 6,712 yards (6,137 m)
- Tour: LPGA Tour
- Format: Stroke play – 72 holes
- Prize fund: $2.6 million
- Month played: March

Tournament record score
- Aggregate: 269 Bailey Tardy (2024)
- To par: −19 as above

Current champion
- (South Korea) Lee Mi-hyang

Location in China

The Blue Bay LPGA is a women's professional golf tournament in China on the LPGA Tour. It debuted in October 2014 at Jian Lake Blue Bay Golf Course on Hainan Island.

== Winners ==
Year	Date	Champion	Country	Winning score	To par	Margin of victory	Purse ($)	Winner's share ($)
2026	8 Mar	Lee Mi-hyang	South Korea	67-66-71-73=277	−11	1 stroke	2,600,000	390,000
2025	9 Mar	Rio Takeda	Japan	69-69-69-64=271	−17	6 strokes	2,500,000	375,000
2024	10 Mar	Bailey Tardy	United States	68-70-66-65=269	−19	4 strokes	2,200,000	330,000
2023	Tournament canceled due to the COVID-19 pandemic							
2022	No tournament							
2021	Tournament canceled due to the COVID-19 pandemic							
2020	Tournament canceled due to the COVID-19 pandemic							
2019	No tournament							
2018	10 Nov	Gaby López	Mexico	70-71-66-73=280	−8	1 stroke	2,100,000	315,000
2017	11 Nov	Shanshan Feng	China	69-67-73-70=279	−9	1 stroke	2,100,000	315,000
2016	23 Oct	Minjee Lee	Australia	65-67-73-70=275	−13	1 stroke	2,100,000	315,000
2015	1 Nov	Sei-Young Kim	South Korea	70-72-74-70=286	−2	1 stroke	2,000,000	300,000
2014	27 Oct*	Lee-Anne Pace	South Africa	67-66-67=200	−16	3 strokes	2,000,000	300,000

* The 2014 tournament was reduced to 54 holes due to unplayable conditions stemming from heavy rain,
and was held over to 27 October due to lack of daylight during the scheduled final round.

== Tournament records ==
Year	Player	Score	Round
2024	Savannah Grewal	64 (−8)	3rd
2025	Rio Takeda	64 (−8)	4th
