= Jang Ha-na =

South Korean professional golfer (born 1992)

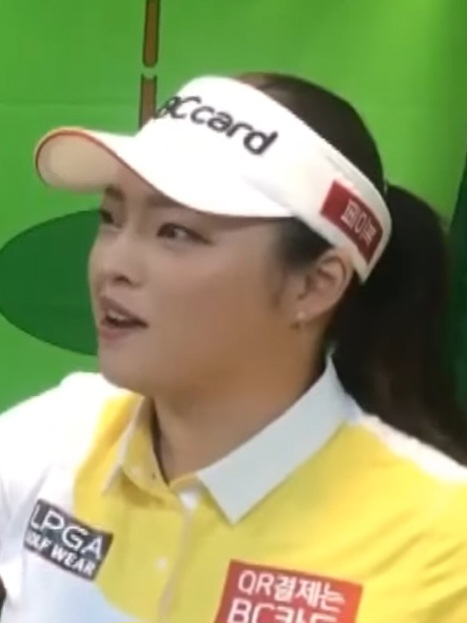

Personal information
- Nationality: South Korea
- Born: 2 May 1992 (age 34) Seoul, South Korea
- Height: 5 ft 5 in (165 cm)

Career
- Sport: Golf
- Turned professional: 2010
- Former tours: LPGA of Korea Tour; LPGA Tour
- Professional wins: 19

Number of wins by tour
- LPGA Tour: 5
- LPGA of Korea Tour: 15

Best results in LPGA major championships
- Chevron Championship: T21: 2017
- Women's PGA C'ship: T30: 2016
- U.S. Women's Open: T21: 2016
- Women's British Open: T5: 2016
- Evian Championship: T3: 2014

Achievements and awards
- LPGA of Korea Tour leading money winner: 2013

Jang Ha-na (born 2 May 1992), also known as Ha Na Jang, is a South Korean professional golfer.

Jang plays on the LPGA of Korea Tour where she has 15 wins and led the money list in 2013. From 2015 through 2017, she played on the LPGA Tour where she won her first LPGA event in February 2016 at the Coates Golf Championship. She currently has endorsement deals with Evergreen Group Holdings, C Card, Honma Golf, Lee Dong Soo Sport and Kumho Tires.

The week prior to her LPGA Tour win, Jang became the first LPGA Tour golfer to hit a hole-in-one on a par-4. This occurred at the 8th hole during the third round of the Pure Silk-Bahamas LPGA Classic at the Ocean Club.

In May 2017, Jang rescinded her LPGA Tour membership and returned to the LPGA of Korea Tour.

== Professional wins (19) ==
=== LPGA Tour wins (5) ===
No.	Date	Tournament	Winning score	To par	Margin of victory	Runner-up
1	6 Feb 2016	Coates Golf Championship	65-72-68-72=277	−11	2 strokes	(Canada) Brooke Henderson
2	6 Mar 2016	HSBC Women's Champions	70-66-68-65=269	−19	4 strokes	(Thailand) Pornanong Phatlum
3	9 Oct 2016	Fubon LPGA Taiwan Championship	69-69-62-71=271	−17	1 stroke	(China) Shanshan Feng
4	19 Feb 2017	ISPS Handa Women's Australian Open	70-73-70-69=282	−10	3 strokes	(Denmark) Nanna Madsen
5	27 Oct 2019	BMW Ladies Championship^{1}	69-67-68-65=269	−19	Playoff	(United States) Danielle Kang

^{1} Co-sanctioned with KLPGA Tour

LPGA Tour playoff record (1–1)

No.	Year	Tournament	Opponent	Result
1	2015	Marathon Classic	(South Korea) Chella Choi	Lost to par on first extra hole
2	2019	BMW Ladies Championship	(United States) Danielle Kang	Won with birdie on third extra hole

=== LPGA of Korea Tour wins (15) ===
No.	Date	Tournament	Winning score	To par	Margin of victory	Runner(s)-up
1	28 Oct 2012	**KB Financial STAR Championship**	70-67-74=211	−5	1 stroke	(South Korea) Kim Ha-neul (South Korea) Kim Hyun-ji (South Korea) Yang Je-yoon
2	26 May 2013	Doosan Match Play Championship	2 up			(South Korea) Chun In-gee
3	6 Oct 2013	Rush n Cash Classic	67-66-73=206	−10	4 strokes	(South Korea) Chun In-gee
4	13 Oct 2013	**Hite Jinro Championship**	69-71-67-65=272	−16	6 strokes	(South Korea) Hee-kyung Seo
5	15 Dec 2013	Hyundai China Ladies Open	69-71-73=213	−3	1 stroke	(South Korea) Kim Ha-neul (South Korea) Kim Hye-youn (South Korea) Lee Jeong-eun
6	31 Aug 2014	Charity High1 Resort Open	69-65-70=204	−12	2 strokes	(South Korea) Chun In-gee
7	28 Jun 2015	BC Card-Hankyung Ladies Cup	70-69-69-68=276	−12	1 stroke	(South Korea) Ha Min-song (South Korea) Jang Su-yeon (South Korea) Jung Hee-won
8	26 Sep 2015	YTN-Volvik Women's Open	65-65-70=200	−16	4 strokes	(South Korea) Cho Jeong-min (South Korea) Ha Min-song (South Korea) Kim Min-sun
9	11 Mar 2018	Korea Investment & Securities Championship	69-69-66=204	−12	Playoff	(South Korea) Ha Min-song
10	29 Apr 2018	**CreaS F&C KLPGA Championship**	68-70-64-72=274	−14	2 strokes	(South Korea) Choi Hye-jin (South Korea) Kim Ji-yeong
11	6 Oct 2019	Hana Financial Group Championship	69-65-72-70=276	−12	1 stroke	(South Korea) Kim Ji-yeong (South Korea) Lee Da-yeon
12	27 Oct 2019	BMW Ladies Championship^{1}	69-67-68-65=269	−19	Playoff	(United States) Danielle Kang
13	2 Nov 2020	SK Networks Seokyung Ladies Classic	72-68-70-71=281	−7	2 strokes	(South Korea) Jun U-ree (South Korea) Kim Hyo-joo (South Korea) Kim Ji-hyun (South Korea) Park Min-ji
14	6 Jun 2021	Lotte Open	70-69-71-72=282	−6	Playoff	(South Korea) Ryu Hae-ran
15	12 Sep 2021	**KB Financial Star Championship**	69-69-69-71=278	−10	7 strokes	(South Korea) Park Hyun-kyung

^{1} Co-sanctioned with LPGA Tour
Tournaments in bold are LPGA of Korea Tour majors.

== Results in LPGA majors ==
Results not in chronological order before 2018.

Tournament	2007	2008	2009	2010	2011	2012	2013	2014	2015	2016	2017	2018
ANA Inspiration								T55	T41	T36	T21	T30
U.S. Women's Open	CUT	CUT						T35	T26	T21		
Women's PGA Championship									T41	T30		
Women's British Open									T31	T5	T49	
The Evian Championship ^								T3	CUT	T17		

^ The Evian Championship was added as a major in 2013.

Top 10
Did not play

CUT = missed the half-way cut
"T" = tied for place

=== Summary ===
Tournament	Wins	2nd	3rd	Top-5	Top-10	Top-25	Events	Cuts made
ANA Inspiration	0	0	0	0	0	1	5	5
U.S. Women's Open	0	0	0	0	0	1	5	3
Women's PGA Championship	0	0	0	0	0	0	2	2
Women's British Open	0	0	0	1	1	1	3	3
The Evian Championship	0	0	1	1	1	2	3	2
Totals	0	0	1	2	2	5	18	15

- Most consecutive cuts made – 8 (2016 ANA – 2018 ANA, current)
- Longest streak of top-10s – 1 (twice)
