= Gaby López =

Mexican professional golfer (born 1993)

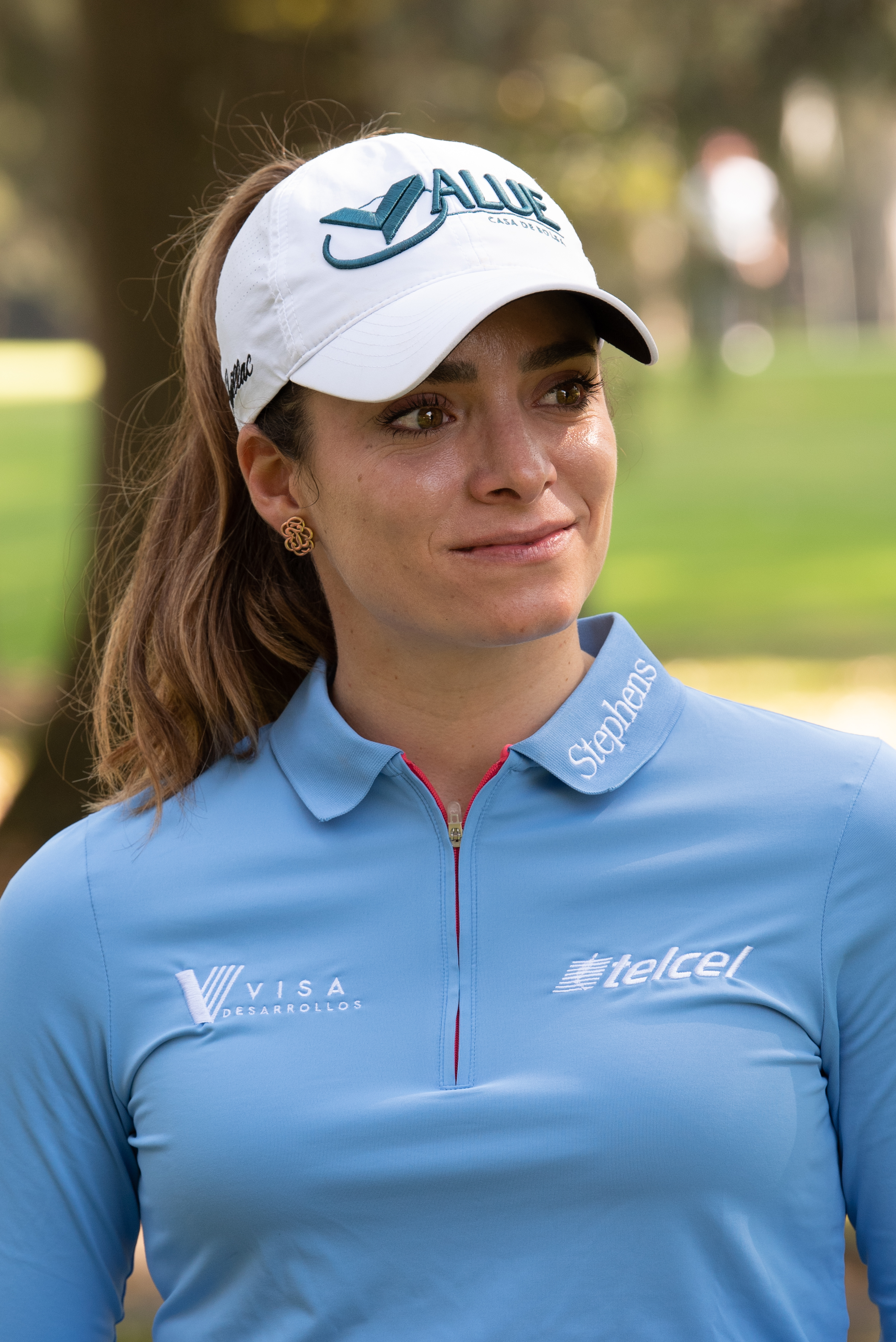
- López in 2021

Personal information
- Full name: Maria Gabriela López Butron
- Nationality: Mexico
- Born: 9 November 1993 (age 33) Mexico City, Mexico
- Height: 5 ft 6 in (168 cm)

Career
- Sport: Golf
- College: University of Arkansas
- Turned professional: 2015
- Current tour: LPGA Tour
- Professional wins: 3

Number of wins by tour
- LPGA Tour: 3

Best results in LPGA major championships
- Chevron Championship: T12: 2026
- Women's PGA C'ship: T9: 2020
- U.S. Women's Open: T2: 2026
- Women's British Open: T29: 2021
- Evian Championship: T3: 2023

Maria Gabriela López Butron (9 November 1993) is a Mexican professional golfer.

== Early life and amateur career ==
In 1993, López was born in Mexico City.

Lopez played college golf at the University of Arkansas. She won three events and was individual runner-up at the 2015 NCAA Division I Championship for the University of Arkansas.

== Professional career ==
López began playing on the LPGA Tour in 2016 after finishing T-10 at 2015 qualifying school. López qualified for the 2016 Summer Olympics and finished 31st.

On 10 November 2018, López won her first LPGA Tour event at the Blue Bay LPGA. López placed 23rd at the women's Olympic golf tournament in Tokyo 2020.

== Amateur wins ==
- 2010 Callaway Junior World (Girls 15–17), Mayakoba Junior Classic
- 2011 Campeonato Nacional Infantil/Juvenil
- 2012 Copa Yucatán Ladies, Campeonato Nacional Interzonas LII
- 2013 Westbrook Invitational
- 2014 Mexican Amateur, LSU Tiger Classic, Liz Murphey Collegiate Classic

== Professional wins (3) ==
=== LPGA Tour wins (3) ===
| No. | Date | Tournament | Winning score | To par | Margin of victory | Runner(s)-up | Winner's share ($) |
|---|---|---|---|---|---|---|---|
| 1 | 10 Nov 2018 | Blue Bay LPGA | 70-71-66-73=280 | −8 | 1 stroke | (Thailand) Ariya Jutanugarn | 315,000 |
| 2 | 20 Jan 2020 | Diamond Resorts Tournament of Champions | 65-69-71-66=271 | −13 | Playoff | (Japan) Nasa Hataoka (South Korea) Inbee Park | 180,000 |
| 3 | 4 Sep 2022 | Dana Open | 67-70-66-63=266 | −18 | 1 stroke | (United States) Megan Khang | 262,500 |

LPGA Tour playoff record (1–0)

| No. | Year | Tournament | Opponents | Result |
|---|---|---|---|---|
| 1 | 2020 | Diamond Resorts Tournament of Champions | (Japan) Nasa Hataoka (South Korea) Inbee Park | Won with birdie on seventh extra hole Park eliminated by par on third hole |

== Results in LPGA majors ==
Results not in chronological order.

| Tournament | 2012 | 2013 | 2014 | 2015 | 2016 | 2017 | 2018 | 2019 | 2020 |
|---|---|---|---|---|---|---|---|---|---|
| Chevron Championship | | | | | CUT | CUT | T55 | T35 | T59 |
| Women's PGA Championship | | | | | T58 | T29 | T40 | CUT | T9 |
| U.S. Women's Open | CUT | | | CUT | T11 | CUT | CUT | T30 | T46 |
| The Evian Championship ^ | | | | | CUT | T18 | T61 | 61 | NT |
| Women's British Open | | | | | T37 | CUT | | CUT | T59 |

| Tournament | 2021 | 2022 | 2023 | 2024 | 2025 | 2026 |
|---|---|---|---|---|---|---|
| Chevron Championship | T25 | CUT | T28 | CUT | CUT | T12 |
| U.S. Women's Open | T41 | CUT | T27 | T39 | T19 | T2 |
| Women's PGA Championship | CUT | T40 | CUT | T14 | T47 | T12 |
| The Evian Championship | | T27 | T3 | T26 | T9 | CUT |
| Women's British Open | T29 | T58 | T40 | T49 | CUT | CUT |

^ The Evian Championship was added as a major in 2013.

Top 10
Did not play

CUT = missed the half-way cut
NT = no tournament
"T" = tied

=== Summary ===
| Tournament | Wins | 2nd | 3rd | Top-5 | Top-10 | Top-25 | Events | Cuts made |
|---|---|---|---|---|---|---|---|---|
| Chevron Championship | 0 | 0 | 0 | 0 | 0 | 2 | 11 | 6 |
| U.S. Women's Open | 0 | 1 | 0 | 1 | 1 | 3 | 13 | 8 |
| Women's PGA Championship | 0 | 0 | 0 | 0 | 1 | 3 | 11 | 8 |
| The Evian Championship | 0 | 0 | 1 | 1 | 2 | 3 | 9 | 7 |
| Women's British Open | 0 | 0 | 0 | 0 | 0 | 0 | 10 | 6 |
| Totals | 0 | 1 | 1 | 2 | 4 | 11 | 54 | 35 |

== World ranking ==
Position in Women's World Golf Rankings at the end of each calendar year.

| Year | Ranking | Source |
|---|---|---|
| 2014 | 486 | |
| 2015 | 439 | |
| 2016 | 84 | |
| 2017 | 115 | |
| 2018 | 90 | |
| 2019 | 56 | |
| 2020 | 56 | |
| 2021 | 54 | |
| 2022 | 37 | |
| 2023 | 46 | |
| 2024 | 77 | |
| 2025 | 36 | |

== Team appearances ==
- Espirito Santo Trophy (representing Mexico): 2010, 2014

Olympic Games
| Preceded by Germán Madrazo | Flagbearer for Mexico (with Rommel Pacheco); Tokyo 2020 | Succeeded by Donovan Carrillo and Sarah Schleper |
