= 2018 U.S. Women's Open =

Tournament information
- Dates: May 31 – June 3, 2018
- Location: Shoal Creek, Alabama; 33.438°N 86.612°W
- Course: Shoal Creek Club
- Organized by: USGA
- Tour: LPGA Tour

Statistics
- Par: 72
- Length: 6,732 yards (6,156 m)
- Field: 156 players, 63 after cut
- Cut: 148 (+4)
- Prize fund: $5.0 million
- Winner's share: $900,000

Champion
- (Thailand) Ariya Jutanugarn
- 277 (−11)
- Location in the United States Location in Alabama

The 2018 U.S. Women's Open was the 73rd U.S. Women's Open, played May 31 – June 3 at Shoal Creek Club in Shoal Creek, Alabama, a suburb southeast of Birmingham.

The U.S. Women's Open is the oldest of the five current major championships and the second of the 2018 season. It has the largest purse in women's golf at $5 million. The tournament was televised by Fox Sports 1 and Fox Sports.

The championship was moved up in the schedule this year; it had been played in July for decades, with a few exceptions. Also, the playoff format was modified as part of USGA changes for the four U.S. Open championships in golf (Open, Women's Open, Senior Open, Senior Women's) in 2018, reduced from three to two aggregate holes, followed by sudden death.

Ariya Jutanugarn won the championship in a playoff over Kim Hyo-joo, which ended on the fourth extra hole.

== Qualifying and field ==
The championship was open to any female professional or amateur golfer with a USGA handicap index not exceeding 2.4. Players qualified by competing in one of 24 36-hole qualifying tournaments held at sites across the United States and at international sites in China, England, Japan, and South Korea. Additional players were exempt from qualifying because of past performances in professional or amateur tournaments around the world.

=== Exempt from qualifying ===
Many players were exempt in multiple categories. Players are listed only once, in the first category in which they became exempt, with additional categories in parentheses () next to their names. Golfers qualifying in Category 12 who qualified in other categories are denoted with the tour by which they qualified.

1. Winners of the U.S. Women's Open for the last ten years (2008–2017)

Chun In-gee (7,9,14,15), Paula Creamer, Ji Eun-hee (9,10,11,14,15), Brittany Lang (9), Inbee Park (4,5,9,10,11,14,15), Park Sung-hyun (8,9,11,14,15), Ryu So-yeon (6,8,9,14,15), Michelle Wie (9,10,11,14,15)

- Choi Na-yeon did not play

2. Winner and runner-up from the 2017 U.S. Women's Amateur; winner of the 2017 U.S. Girls' Junior and U.S. Women's Mid-Amateur (must be an amateur)

Kelsey Chugg (a), Sophia Schubert (a), Erica Shepherd (a), Albane Valenzuela (a)

3. Winner of the 2017 Mark H. McCormack Medal (Women's World Amateur Golf Ranking) (must be an amateur)

- Leona Maguire (a) did not play

4. Winners of the Women's PGA Championship for the last five years (2013–2017)

Brooke Henderson (9,10,11,14,15), Danielle Kang (9,14,15)

5. Winners of the Ricoh Women's British Open for the last five years (2013–2017)

Ariya Jutanugarn (9,10,11,14,15), In-Kyung Kim (9,11,14,15), Stacy Lewis (9,11,14,15), Mo Martin (9)

6. Winners of the ANA Inspiration for the last five years (2014–2018)

Lydia Ko (7,9,11,14,15), Brittany Lincicome (9,11,14,15), Pernilla Lindberg (9,10,11,14,15), Lexi Thompson (9,11,14,15)

7. Winners of the Evian Championship for the last five years (2013–2017)

Kim Hyo-joo (9), Anna Nordqvist (9,11,14,15)

- Suzann Pettersen (9,14,15) did not play

8. Ten lowest scorers and anyone tying for 10th place from the 2017 U.S. Women's Open

Choi Hye-jin (14,15), Carlota Ciganda (9,12-LET,14,15), Shanshan Feng (9,10,11,14,15), M. J. Hur (9,14,15), Kim Sei-young (9,14,15), Lee Jeong-eun (12-KLPGA,14,15), Mirim Lee (9,14,15), Amy Yang (9,14,15)

9. Top 75 money leaders from the 2017 final official LPGA money list

Marina Alex (14,15), Brittany Altomare (14,15), Nicole Broch Larsen, Ashleigh Buhai, Peiyun Chien, Chella Choi (14), Cydney Clanton, Jacqui Concolino, Austin Ernst, Jodi Ewart Shadoff (14,15), Sandra Gal, Hsu Wei-ling, Charley Hull (14,15), Karine Icher, Moriya Jutanugarn (10,11,14,15), Kim Kaufman, Cristie Kerr (11,14,15), Megan Khang, Katherine Kirk, Jessica Korda (10,11,14,15), Nelly Korda (14,15), Olafia Kristinsdottir, Candie Kung, Lee Jeong-eun, Lee Mi-hyang (11,14,15), Minjee Lee (11,14,15), Gaby López, Caroline Masson (15), Ally McDonald, Azahara Muñoz (12-LET,14), Haru Nomura, Su-Hyun Oh, Ryann O'Toole, Jane Park, Pornanong Phatlum, Madelene Sagström, Lizette Salas (14,15), Alena Sharp, Jenny Shin (14,15), Sarah Jane Smith, Jennifer Song (14,15), Angela Stanford, Ayako Uehara, Jing Yan, Angel Yin (15), Yoo Sun-young

- Laura Gonzalez Escallon, Jang Ha-na (14,15) and Gerina Piller did not play

10. Top 10 money leaders from the 2018 official LPGA money list, through the close of entries on April 25

Ko Jin-young (11,12-KLPGA,14,15)

11. Winners of LPGA co-sponsored events, whose victories are considered official, from the conclusion of the 2017 U.S. Women's Open to the initiation of the 2018 U.S. Women's Open

12. Top five money leaders from the 2017 Japan LPGA Tour, Korea LPGA Tour and Ladies European Tour

Georgia Hall (14,15), Kim Ji-hyun, Lee Min-young (14,15), Teresa Lu (14,15), Klára Spilková, Ai Suzuki (14,15), Anne van Dam

- Kim Hae-rym (14,15), Kim Ha-neul (14), Oh Ji-hyun, and Jiyai Shin (14,15) did not play

13. Top three money leaders from the 2017 China LPGA Tour

Saranporn Langkulgasettrin, Lee Solar, Supamas Sangchan

14. Top 50 point leaders from the current Rolex Rankings and anyone tying for 50th place as of April 25

Nasa Hataoka (15)

15. Top 50 point leaders from the current Rolex Rankings and anyone tying for 50th place as of May 28

- Ahn Sun-ju did not play

16. Special exemptions selected by the USGA

Karrie Webb

=== Qualifiers ===
Additional players qualified through sectional qualifying tournaments which took place May 2–17 at sites in the United States, China, South Korea, England, and Japan.

May 2 at Canoe Brook Country Club, Summit, New Jersey

Grace Na
Evelyn Arguelles (a)

May 2 at Indiana Country Club, Indiana, Pennsylvania

Olivia Cason (a)

May 3 at Industry Hills Golf Club, City of Industry, California

Patty Tavatanakit (a)
Elizabeth Wang (a)

May 4 at Sugar Mill Country Club, New Smyrna Beach, Florida

Kris Tamulis
Sarah Kemp

May 6 at Ka'anapali Golf Club, Lahaina, Hawaii

Tiffany Chan

May 7 at Dunwoody Country Club, Dunwoody, Georgia

Christine Song
Ssu-Chia Cheng
Katelyn Dambaugh
Emma Talley

May 7 at Elgin Country Club, Elgin, Illinois

Yujeong Son (a)
Martina Edberg

May 8 at La Purisima Golf Club, Lompoc, California

Emily Kristine Pedersen
María Hernández

May 8 at Ohtone Country Club, Ibaraki Prefecture, Japan

Fumika Kawagishi
Minami Hiruta
Kaori Takayama
Kotono Kozuma

May 14 at Arizona Country Club, Phoenix, Arizona

Giulia Molinaro
Cheyenne Woods

May 14 at Contra Costa Country Club, Pleasant Hill, California

Allisen Corpuz (a)
Lucy Li (a)

May 14 at The Ranch Country Club, Westminster, Colorado

Robyn Choi (a)
Jillian Hollis

May 14 at Buckinghamshire Golf Club, Buckinghamshire, England

Linn Grant (a)
Catriona Matthew
Mel Reid
Sarah Schober

May 14 at TPC Prestancia, Sarasota, Florida

Daniela Darquea
Lei Ye (a)
Daniela Holmqvist

May 14 at Dream Park Country Club, Incheon, South Korea

Park Hyun-kyung
Kim Hani did not play

May 14 at Stillwater Country Club, Stillwater, Minnesota

Casey Danielson
Celia Barquín Arozamena (a)

May 14 at Las Colinas Country Club, Irving, Texas

Kaylee Benton (a)
Dylan Kim (a)

May 14 at Deerwood Golf Club, Kingwood, Texas

Kristen Gillman (a)
María Fassi (a)

May 14 at Hermitage Country Club, Manakin-Sabot, Virginia

Paula Reto
Lin Xiyu
Julieta Granada
Gina Kim (a)

May 14 at Rainier Golf & Country Club, Seattle, Washington

Becky Morgan
Sophie Hausmann (a)

May 15 at Bermuda Run Country Club, Advance, North Carolina

Nannette Hill
Britney Yada

May 16 at Shanghai Qizhong Garden Golf Club, Shanghai, China

Yiyi Liu

May 16 at Cape Cod National Golf Club, Brewster, Massachusetts

Celeste Dao (a)
Céline Herbin

May 17 at Seagate Country Club, Delray Beach, Florida

Jenny Suh
Dana Williams (a)

=== Alternates added to field ===
The following players were added to the field before the start of the tournament when spots reserved for exemptions in various categories were not used and to replace players who withdrew from the tournament.

Jennifer Chang (a), Hailee Cooper (a), Lindy Duncan, Andrea Lee (a), Lee Lopez, Wichanee Meechai, Olivia Mehaffey (a), Emilia Migliaccio (a), Song Gaeun (a), Luna Sobrón Galmés, Sophie Walker, Rumi Yoshiba

== Course layout ==
2018 yardages by round

| Round | Hole | 1 | 2 | 3 | 4 | 5 | 6 | 7 | 8 | 9 | Out | 10 | 11 | 12 | 13 | 14 | 15 | 16 | 17 | 18 | In | Total |
|---|---|---|---|---|---|---|---|---|---|---|---|---|---|---|---|---|---|---|---|---|---|---|
| | Par | 4 | 4 | 5 | 4 | 3 | 5 | 4 | 3 | 4 | 36 | 4 | 5 | 4 | 3 | 4 | 4 | 3 | 5 | 4 | 36 | 72 |
| 1 | Yards | 374 | 389 | 505 | 421 | 166 | 475 | 422 | 151 | 383 | 3,286 | 399 | 522 | 429 | 171 | 370 | 376 | 199 | 533 | 404 | 3,403 | 6,689 |
| 2 | Yards | 366 | 387 | 513 | 421 | 154 | 488 | 415 | 140 | 392 | 3,276 | 386 | 526 | 405 | 183 | 363 | 374 | 170 | 532 | 408 | 3,347 | 6,623 |
| 3 | Yards | 380 | 384 | 514 | 413 | 177 | 471 | 422 | 156 | 384 | 3,301 | 407 | 460 | 402 | 139 | 379 | 366 | 210 | 545 | 394 | 3,302 | 6,603 |
| 4 | Yards | 379 | 396 | 492 | 430 | 161 | 489 | 409 | 149 | 385 | 3,290 | 401 | 508 | 431 | 172 | 361 | 389 | 197 | 531 | 416 | 3,406 | 6,696 |

- Scoring average: 74.682
  - by round: 74.705, 75.123, 73.921, 74.318
- Most difficult holes in relation to par: 12, 4, 18, 16

== Round summaries ==
=== First round ===
Thursday, May 31, 2018

| Place | Player | Score | To par |
|---|---|---|---|
| T1 | (Thailand) Ariya Jutanugarn | 67 | −5 |
| T1 | (South Korea) Lee Jeong-eun | 67 | −5 |
| T1 | (Australia) Sarah Jane Smith | 67 | −5 |
| T4 | (Sweden) Linn Grant (a) | 69 | −3 |
| T4 | (United States) Danielle Kang | 69 | −3 |
| T4 | (United States) Michelle Wie | 69 | −3 |
| T7 | (Spain) Luna Sobrón Galmés | 70 | −2 |
| T7 | (United States) Kristen Gillman (a) | 70 | −2 |
| T7 | (South Korea) Kim Hyo-joo | 70 | −2 |
| T7 | (South Korea) Kim Ji-hyun | 70 | −2 |
| T7 | (South Korea) Kim Sei-young | 70 | −2 |
| T7 | (United States) Nelly Korda | 70 | −2 |
| T7 | (Australia) Su-Hyun Oh | 70 | −2 |
| T7 | (South Korea) Inbee Park | 70 | −2 |
| T7 | (Denmark) Emily Kristine Pedersen | 70 | −2 |
| T7 | (England) Mel Reid | 70 | −2 |
| T7 | (Sweden) Madelene Sagström | 70 | −2 |
| T7 | (Thailand) Patty Tavatanakit (a) | 70 | −2 |

=== Second round ===
Friday, June 1, 2018
Saturday June 2, 2018

Weather delayed the conclusion of the second round until Saturday.

| Place | Player | Score | To par |
|---|---|---|---|
| 1 | (Australia) Sarah Jane Smith | 67-67=134 | −10 |
| 2 | (Thailand) Ariya Jutanugarn | 67-70=137 | −7 |
| 3 | (Australia) Su-Hyun Oh | 70-68=138 | −6 |
| T4 | (South Korea) Chella Choi | 71-70=141 | −3 |
| T4 | (Spain) Carlota Ciganda | 73-68=141 | −3 |
| T4 | (Sweden) Linn Grant (a) | 69-72=141 | −3 |
| T4 | (South Korea) Kim Ji-hyun | 70-71=141 | −3 |
| T4 | (South Korea) Kim Sei-young | 70-71=141 | −3 |
| T4 | (South Korea) Inbee Park | 70-71=141 | −3 |
| T4 | (South Korea) Jenny Shin | 72-69=141 | −3 |
| T4 | (United States) Michelle Wie | 69-72=141 | −3 |

=== Third round ===
Saturday, June 2, 2018

| Place | Player | Score | To par |
|---|---|---|---|
| 1 | (Thailand) Ariya Jutanugarn | 67-70-67=204 | −12 |
| 2 | (Australia) Sarah Jane Smith | 67-67-74=208 | −8 |
| 3 | (South Korea) Kim Hyo-joo | 70-72-68=210 | −6 |
| 4 | (South Korea) Kim Ji-hyun | 70-71-70=211 | −5 |
| T5 | (Spain) Carlota Ciganda | 73-68-71=212 | −4 |
| T5 | (South Korea) Inbee Park | 70-71-71=212 | −4 |
| T5 | (Sweden) Madelene Sagström | 70-72-70=212 | −4 |
| 8 | (Taiwan) Wei-Ling Hsu | 71-73-70=214 | −2 |
| T9 | (South Korea) Ji Eun-hee | 73-72-70=215 | −1 |
| T9 | (United States) Megan Khang | 72-74-69=215 | −1 |
| T9 | (United States) Nelly Korda | 70-74-71=215 | −1 |
| T9 | (South Korea) Ryu So-yeon | 73-70-72=215 | −1 |
| T9 | (Thailand) Patty Tavatanakit (a) | 70-73-72=215 | −1 |

=== Final round ===
Sunday, June 3, 2018

| Place | Player | Score | To par | Money ($) |
|---|---|---|---|---|
| T1 | (Thailand) Ariya Jutanugarn | 67-70-67-73=277 | −11 | Playoff |
| T1 | (South Korea) Kim Hyo-joo | 70-72-68-67=277 | −11 | Playoff |
| 3 | (Spain) Carlota Ciganda | 73-68-71-69=281 | −7 | 349,790 |
| 4 | (United States) Danielle Kang | 69-77-70-69=285 | −3 | 244,704 |
| T5 | (Taiwan) Wei-Ling Hsu | 71-73-70-72=286 | −2 | 182,487 |
| T5 | (Australia) Sarah Jane Smith | 67-67-74-78=286 | −2 | 182,487 |
| T5 | (United States) Lexi Thompson | 71-75-70-70=286 | −2 | 182,487 |
| T5 | (Thailand) Patty Tavatanakit (a) | 70-73-72-71=286 | −2 | 0 |
| 9 | (South Korea) Inbee Park | 70-71-71-75=287 | −1 | 145,919 |
| T10 | (Japan) Nasa Hataoka | 74-70-72-72=288 | E | 104,505 |
| T10 | (England) Charley Hull | 74-73-70-71=288 | E | 104,505 |
| T10 | (United States) Megan Khang | 72-74-69-73=288 | E | 104,505 |
| T10 | (South Korea) Kim Ji-hyun | 70-71-70-77=288 | E | 104,505 |
| T10 | (United States) Nelly Korda | 70-74-71-73=288 | E | 104,505 |
| T10 | (United States) Angela Stanford | 73-72-71-72=288 | E | 104,505 |
| T10 | (United States) Michelle Wie | 69-72-76-71=288 | E | 104,505 |

==== Scorecard ====
Final round

| Hole | 1 | 2 | 3 | 4 | 5 | 6 | 7 | 8 | 9 | 10 | 11 | 12 | 13 | 14 | 15 | 16 | 17 | 18 |
|---|---|---|---|---|---|---|---|---|---|---|---|---|---|---|---|---|---|---|
| Par | 4 | 4 | 5 | 4 | 3 | 5 | 4 | 3 | 4 | 4 | 5 | 4 | 3 | 4 | 4 | 3 | 5 | 4 |
| (Thailand) Jutanugarn | −13 | −12 | −13 | −13 | −14 | −15 | −15 | −15 | −16 | −13 | −13 | −12 | −12 | −12 | −12 | −13 | −12 | −11 |
| (South Korea) Kim | −7 | −7 | −8 | −8 | −8 | −9 | −9 | −9 | −9 | −9 | −9 | −10 | −10 | −10 | −11 | −11 | −11 | −11 |
| (Spain) Ciganda | −4 | −4 | −5 | −5 | −5 | −6 | −6 | −7 | −7 | −7 | −8 | −7 | −7 | −7 | −7 | −7 | −8 | −7 |
| (United States) Kang | −1 | −1 | −2 | −2 | −2 | −2 | −3 | −4 | −4 | −4 | −4 | −3 | −3 | −3 | −3 | −3 | −4 | −3 |
| (Australia) Smith | −8 | −7 | −8 | −8 | −8 | −7 | −7 | −8 | −7 | −7 | −5 | −4 | −4 | −4 | −3 | −2 | −2 | −2 |

Cumulative tournament scores, relative to par

| Birdie | Bogey | Double bogey | Triple bogey+ |

=== Playoff ===
In the first year of the new USGA two-hole aggregate playoff format, the playoff was held on holes 14 and 18, both par fours. Jutanugarn parred both while Kim went birdie-bogey to stay tied and it moved to sudden-death, using the same holes only. Both parred the 14th hole, but Kim again made bogey at the 18th hole while Jutanugarn made another par and won the championship.

| Place | Player | Score | To par | Money ($) |
|---|---|---|---|---|
| 1 | (Thailand) Ariya Jutanugarn | 4-4-4-4=16 | E | 900,000 |
| 2 | (South Korea) Kim Hyo-joo | 3-5-4-5=17 | +1 | 540,000 |
