= Lake Merced Golf Club =

Golf club in Daly City, California, US

- Location within the United States Location within California
- 37.696°N 122.473°W

Club information
- Location: 2300 Junipero Serra Blvd. Daly City, California, U.S.
- Elevation: 200 feet (60 m)
- Established: 1922; 104 years ago
- Type: Private
- Total holes: 18
- Tournaments: LPGA Mediheal Championship (2018); Swinging Skirts LPGA Classic (2014–2016); U.S. Girls' Junior (2012); U.S. Junior Amateur (1990)
- Greens: Bentgrass / Poa annua
- Fairways: Bentgrass / Poa annua
- Designed by: Willie Locke (1922); Alister MacKenzie (1929); Rees Jones (1996); Gil Hanse (2021)
- Par: 72
- Length: 6,923 yards (6,330 m)
- Course rating: 73.9
- Slope rating: 140

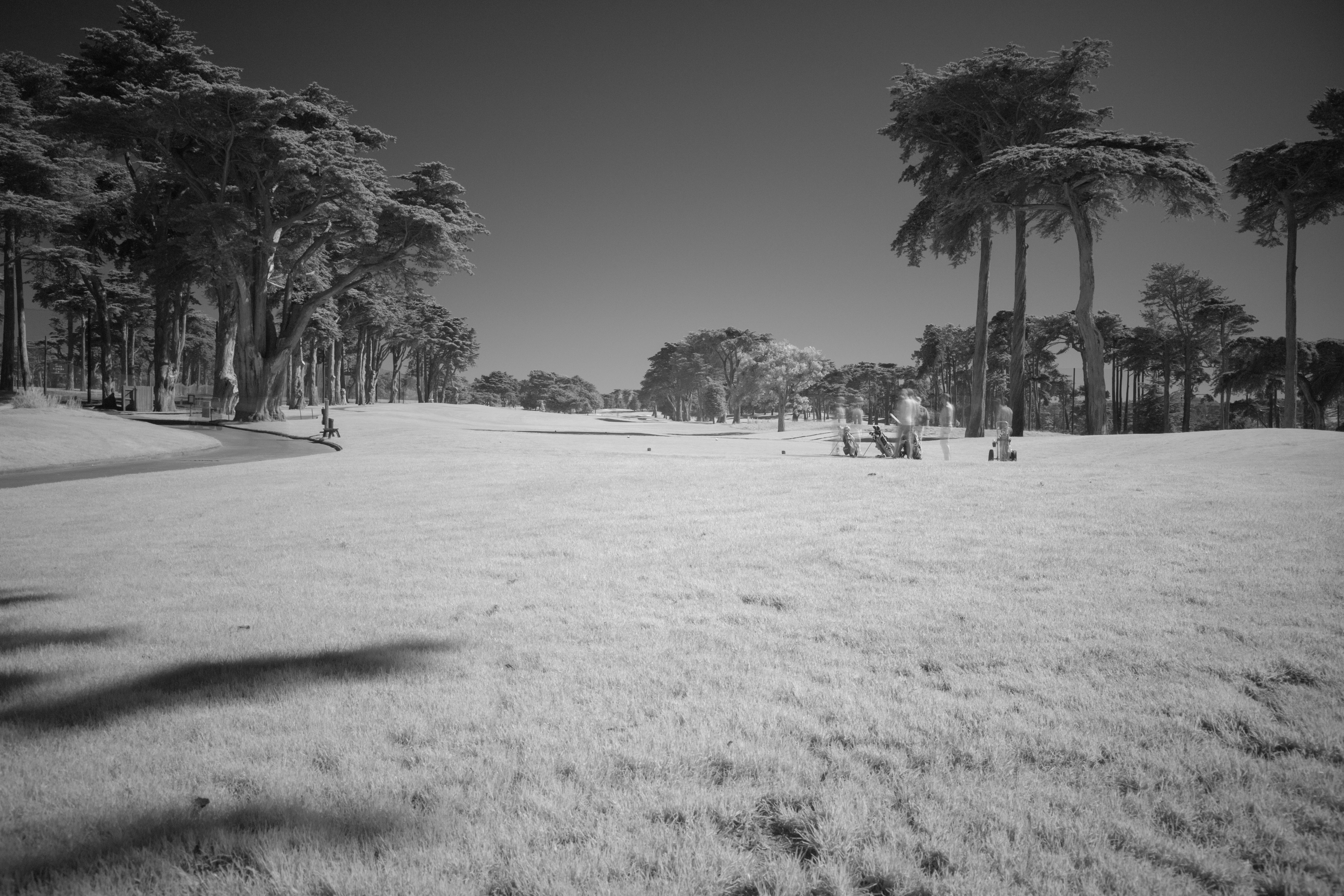
Lake Merced Golf Club, San Francisco, California, US

Lake Merced Golf Club is an 18-hole private golf club on the West Coast of the United States, located in Daly City, California, an adjacent suburb south of San Francisco.

Founded 104 years ago in 1922, the course opened the following year. Originally designed by Willie Lock, Alister MacKenzie improved the bunkers and areas around the greens in 1929, and Rees Jones handled the course update in 1996. The course lost land on its eastern boundary to eminent domain in the 1960s for the construction of Interstate 280, and several holes were altered, redesigned by Robert Muir Graves.

== Tour Events ==
Lake Merced was the site of the Swinging Skirts LPGA Classic for three years (2014–2016) and was the host of the LPGA Mediheal Championship for many years. Lydia Ko won three of the first four events at the course (2014, 2015, 2018). More recently, the club hosted the final stop on Steph Curry's Golf Tour, the Curry Cup.

== Renovations ==
The course was originally designed by Willie Locke, featured more than 200 bunkers. Seven years after opening, the club hired Alister MacKenzie to renovate the golf course. MacKenzie made major modifications to the course - increased the length, removed 140 bunkers while restyling the remaining 90 or so, and built a new 17th hole (current hole #13). The routing remained largely the same until the construction of highway 280 in 1962 encroached on the east side of the property and forced a change led by Robert Muir Graves, rerouting almost all of the golf course and dramatically changing the look, feel and playing characteristics. The MacKenzie course featured sandy waste areas, deep barrancas, signature mounding, foot bridges and foot paths. In an effort to restore the original MacKenzie vision in 2021, Gil Hanse and his team moved 75,000 cubic yards of dirt, entirely rerouting the course. One of Gil's first missions was to reimagine the land as it was prior to heavy machinery and then restore that topography. In all, Gil and his contractors rebuilt all 18 greens, created a 36,000 square foot Himalaya-style putting course, built new short-game practice areas, added a turf research nursery, refurbished 150,000 square feet of bunkering, restored and expanded all 18 tee complexes, moved the practice facility from one end of the property to the other, and installed a two-wire irrigation system using flexible, no-leak HDPE piping. The team mimicked MacKenzie's bunker design with classic cloud formations, sitting down into the green or floating above the grade, and restored the original dramatic gradation.

Gil was responsible for restoring lost holes from earlier layouts. Using the club's collection of historical photos, aerials, and maps, he restored bunkers and greens with close reference to the original designs, making only limited adjustments where necessary. From a restoration perspective, the club noted the accuracy with which Gil was able to restore these features.

Members described the course prior to 2021 as brutal. Now they have replaced the long, difficult uphill shots with more enjoyable downhill approaches and deep bunkering designed by Rees Jones in the mid-1990s with shallower, larger MacKenzie-style bunkering which is easier to find but also easier to escape.

== Course ==
Hole	Yards	Par	Hole	Yards	Par
1	388	4	10	317	4
2	377	4	11	328	4
3	135	3	12	476	4
4	485	4	13	149	3
5	485	4	14	538	5
6	423	4	15	421	4
7	207	3	16	162	3
8	636	5	17	454	4
9	508	5	18	539	5
Out		3,539	In	3,384	36
Source: |Total				6,923	72
