= 1990 PGA Championship =

Tournament information
- Dates: August 9–12, 1990
- Location: Birmingham, Alabama; 33.438°N 86.612°W
- Course: Shoal Creek Golf and Country Club
- Organized by: PGA of America
- Tour: PGA Tour

Statistics
- Par: 72
- Length: 7,145 yards (6,533 m)
- Field: 152 players, 74 after cut
- Cut: 151 (+7)
- Prize fund: $1.35 million
- Winner's share: $225,000

Champion
- (Australia) Wayne Grady
- 282 (−6)

Location map
- Location in the United States Location in Alabama

The 1990 PGA Championship was the 72nd PGA Championship, held August 9–12 at Shoal Creek Golf and Country Club in Birmingham, Alabama. Wayne Grady won his only major championship, three strokes ahead of runner-up Fred Couples.

In the final round, Couples led by a stroke after a birdie at the 12th hole, but then had four consecutive bogeys, while Grady shot par for the rest of the round. Defending champion Payne Stewart was in the final pairing with Grady, but was two-over par on the front nine. On the par-5 11th hole, he put his third shot into the water and fell from contention with a triple bogey.

Grady became the third Australian-born player to win the PGA Championship, preceded by Jim Ferrier in 1947 and David Graham in 1979. It was Grady's second and final win on the PGA Tour.

Concerns about racial discrimination in the club's membership caused many sponsors to pull their network television advertising, including IBM. This was the final year that ABC carried the broadcast, replaced by CBS in 1991.

== Controversy ==
Leading up to the tournament, Shoal Creek founder Hall Thompson doubled down on the club's policy of excluding African-Americans from membership. Various groups threatened to protest the event and sponsors pulled out, and the PGA considered moving the tournament away from Shoal Creek. In the end, a local African-American executive accepted an invitation to become an honorary member and the tournament was held as planned.

== Venue ==
This was the second PGA Championship at Shoal Creek, which hosted six years earlier in 1984. Opened in 1977, the course was designed by Jack Nicklaus; it was the venue for the Regions Tradition, a senior major championship, from 2011 through 2015, and the U.S. Women's Open in 2018.

=== Course layout ===
Hole	1	2	3	4	5	6	7	8	9	Out	10	11	12	13	14	15	16	17	18	In	Total
Yards	410	417	516	456	190	540	448	173	437	3,587	421	516	451	195	379	405	215	530	446	3,558	7,145
Par	4	4	5	4	3	5	4	3	4	36	4	5	4	3	4	4	3	5	4	36	72

Previous course lengths for major championships

- 7,145 yards (6,533 m) – par 72, 1984 PGA Championship

== Round summaries ==
=== First round ===
Thursday, August 9, 1990

Place	Player	Score	To par
1	(United States) Bobby Wadkins	68	−4
T2	(United States) Fred Couples	69	−3
T2	(United States) Mark O'Meara	69	−3
T4	(United States) Billy Mayfair	70	−2
T4	(United States) Scott Verplank	70	−2
T6	(United States) Chip Beck	71	−1
T6	(England) Nick Faldo	71	−1
T6	(United States) Robert Gamez	71	−1
T6	(United States) Mike Hulbert	71	−1
T6	(United States) Steve Pate	71	−1
T6	(United States) Mike Reid	71	−1
T6	(United States) Tim Simpson	71	−1
T6	(United States) Payne Stewart	71	−1
T6	(United States) Brian Tennyson	71	−1
T6	(United States) Stan Utley	71	−1

=== Second round ===
Friday, August 10, 1990

Place	Player	Score	To par
1	(Australia) Wayne Grady	72-67=139	−5
T2	(United States) Fred Couples	69-71=140	−4
T2	(United States) Larry Mize	72-68=140	−4
T4	(United States) Chip Beck	71-70=141	−3
T4	(United States) Billy Mayfair	70-71=141	−3
T6	(United States) Payne Stewart	71-72=143	−1
T6	(United States) Stan Utley	71-72=143	−1
T6	(United States) Bobby Wadkins	68-75=143	−1
T6	(United States) Fuzzy Zoeller	72-71=143	−1
T10	(United States) Ben Crenshaw	74-70=144	E
T10	(United States) John Huston	72-72=144	E
T10	(United States) Davis Love III	72-72=144	E
T10	(United States) Loren Roberts	73-71=144	E
T10	(United States) Tim Simpson	71-73=144	E

=== Third round ===
Saturday, August 11, 1990

Place	Player	Score	To par
1	(Australia) Wayne Grady	72-67-72=211	−5
T2	(United States) Fred Couples	69-71-73=213	−3
T2	(United States) Payne Stewart	71-72-70=213	−3
T4	(United States) Gil Morgan	77-72-65=214	−2
T4	(United States) Loren Roberts	73-71-70=214	−2
T6	(United States) Billy Mayfair	70-71-75=216	E
T6	(United States) Larry Mize	72-68-76=216	E
8	(United States) Steve Pate	71-75-71=217	+1
9	(United States) Bill Britton	72-74-72=218	+2
T10	(United States) Chip Beck	71-70-78=219	+3
T10	(United States) Bob Boyd	74-74-71=219	+3
T10	(South Africa) David Frost	76-74-69=219	+3
T10	(United States) Hale Irwin	77-72-70=219	+3
T10	(United States) Tim Simpson	71-73-75=219	+3
T10	(United States) Brian Tennyson	71-77-71=219	+3
T10	(United States) Scott Verplank	70-76-73=219	+3
T10	(Wales) Ian Woosnam	74-75-70=219	+3
T10	(United States) Fuzzy Zoeller	72-71-76=219	+3

=== Final round ===
Sunday, August 12, 1990

Place	Player	Score	To par	Money ($)
1	(Australia) Wayne Grady	72-67-72-71=282	−6	225,000
2	(United States) Fred Couples	69-71-73-72=285	−3	135,000
3	(United States) Gil Morgan	77-72-65-72=286	−2	90,000
4	(United States) Bill Britton	72-74-72-71=289	+1	73,500
T5	(United States) Chip Beck	71-70-78-71=290	+2	51,667
T5	(United States) Billy Mayfair	70-71-75-74=290	+2	51,667
T5	(United States) Loren Roberts	73-71-70-76=290	+2	51,667
T8	(Zimbabwe) Mark McNulty	74-72-75-71=292	+4	34,375
T8	(United States) Don Pooley	75-74-71-72=292	+4	34,375
T8	(United States) Tim Simpson	71-73-75-73=292	+4	34,375
T8	(United States) Payne Stewart	71-72-70-79=292	+4	34,375

==== Scorecard ====
Hole	1	2	3	4	5	6	7	8	9	10	11	12	13	14	15	16	17	18
Par	4	4	5	4	3	5	4	3	4	4	5	4	3	4	4	3	5	4
(Australia) Grady	−6	−5	−6	−7	−7	−7	−7	−7	−6	−7	−7	−6	−6	−6	−6	−6	−6	−6
(United States) Couples	−3	−3	−4	−4	−4	−5	−5	−5	−5	−5	−6	−7	−6	−5	−4	−3	−3	−3
(United States) Morgan	−3	−3	−3	−2	−2	−3	−4	−4	−4	−5	−5	−5	−3	−3	−3	−2	−2	−2
(United States) Stewart	−3	−2	−2	−2	−1	−2	−2	−2	−1	−1	+2	+2	+2	+3	+4	+4	+4	+4

Cumulative tournament scores, relative to par

Birdie	Bogey	Double bogey	Triple bogey+
