= Swinging Skirts LPGA Classic =

Golf Tournament

Coordinates: 37.696°N 122.473°W

Tournament information
- Location: Daly City, California, U.S.
- Established: 2014
- Course: Lake Merced Golf Club
- Par: 72
- Length: 6,507 yards (5,950 m)
- Tour: LPGA Tour
- Format: Stroke play - 72 holes
- Prize fund: $2 million
- Month played: April

Tournament record score
- Aggregate: 276 Lydia Ko (2014)
- To par: −12 Lydia Ko (2014)

Current champion
- (Japan) Haru Nomura

Location in the United States
Location in California

The Swinging Skirts LPGA Classic was a women's professional golf tournament in California on the LPGA Tour, held at Lake Merced Golf Club in Daly City, an adjacent suburb south of San Francisco. It debuted in April 2014, but ran for just three years, the LPGA Mediheal Championship succeeded it in 2018, also played at Lake Merced.

== Course history ==
Originally designed by Willie Locke, Lake Merced Golf Club opened 103 years ago in July 1923 and was re-designed in 1929 by Alister MacKenzie, architect of the Augusta National Golf Club. Robert Muir Graves re-routed the course in the 1960s to accommodate Interstate 280, and the most recent revision was completed by Rees Jones in 1996. Southeast of Lake Merced, the course is near San Francisco Golf Club, Olympic Club, and TPC Harding Park.

== Winners ==
Year	Dates	Champion	Country	Winning score	To par	Margin of victory	Purse ($)	Winner's share ($)
2016	Apr 21–24	Haru Nomura	Japan	65-70-71-73=279	−9	4 strokes	2,000,000	300,000
2015	Apr 23–26	Lydia Ko (2)	New Zealand	67-72-71-70=280	−8	Playoff	2,000,000	300,000
2014	Apr 24–27	Lydia Ko	New Zealand	68-71-68-69=276	−12	1 stroke	1,800,000	270,000

- Succeeded by LPGA Mediheal Championship in 2018, also at Lake Merced Golf Club.

== Tournament records ==
Year	Player	Score	Round
2016	Ryu So-yeon	63 (−9)	1st
