= 2020 Women's PGA Championship =

2020 KPMG Women's PGA Championship

Tournament information
- Dates: October 8–11, 2020
- Location: Newtown Square, Pennsylvania; 40.0040°N 75.2432°W
- Course: Aronimink Golf Club
- Organized by: PGA of America
- Tour: LPGA Tour
- Format: Stroke play - 72 holes

Statistics
- Par: 72
- Length: 6,831 yards (6,246 m)
- Field: 132 players, 75 after cut
- Cut: 146 (+6)
- Prize fund: $4.3 million
- Winner's share: $645,000

Champion
- (South Korea) Kim Sei-young
- 266 (−14)
- Location in the United States Location in Pennsylvania

The 2020 KPMG Women's PGA Championship was the 66th Women's PGA Championship. It was originally scheduled to be played June 25–28 at Aronimink Golf Club in Newtown Square, Pennsylvania. It was rescheduled to October 8–11 as a result of the COVID-19 pandemic. Known as the LPGA Championship through 2014, it was the third of four major championships on the LPGA Tour during the 2020 season.

Kim Sei-young won with a record low aggregate of 266, 14 under par, after a final round 63. She finished five strokes ahead of Inbee Park, who had a last round of 65.

== Field ==
The field included 132 players who met one or more of the selection criteria and commit to participate by a designated deadline. With the exception of one place reserved for the winner of the ShopRite LPGA Classic, the final field was set on September 22.

Leading contenders were expected to include world number two Nelly Korda, 2017 winner and world number three Danielle Kang, world number four and 2020 ANA Inspiration runner-up Brooke Henderson, and 2018 winner and world number six Park Sung-hyun. Several top-ranked South Koreans did not play, including world number one Ko Jin-young, Ryu So-yeon, Kim Hyo-joo and Lee Jeong-eun. Also in the field were six club professionals. Sandra Gal and Julia Engström were the recipients of the two sponsors invites.

=== Qualification criteria ===
1. Active LPGA Hall of Fame members
2. Past winners of the Women's PGA Championship
3. Professionals who have won an LPGA major championship since the start of 2015
4. Professionals who have won an official LPGA tournament since the start of 2018
5. Winner of the Dow Great Lakes Bay Invitational in 2019
6. Professionals who finished in the top-10 and ties at the previous year's Women's PGA Championship
7. Professionals ranked No. 1-40 on the Women's World Golf Rankings as of March 16, 2020
8. Professionals ranked No. 1-40 on the Women's World Golf Rankings as of September 15, 2020
9. The top-8 finishers at the 2019 LPGA T&CP National Championship
10. The top finisher (not otherwise qualified via the 2019 LPGA T&CP National Championship) at the 2020 PGA Women's Stroke Play Championship
11. Members of the European and United States Solheim Cup teams in 2019
12. Maximum of two sponsor invites
13. Any player who did not compete in the 2019 KPMG Women's PGA Championship due to maternity, provided she was otherwise qualified to compete.
14. LPGA members ranked in the order of their position on the 2020 official money list as of the commitment deadline
15. The remainder of the field will be filled by members who have committed to the event, ranked in the order of their position on the 2020 LPGA Priority List as of the commitment deadline

== Round summaries ==
=== First round ===
Thursday, October 8, 2020

Place	Player	Score	To par
T1	(United States) Brittany Lincicome	67	−3
T1	(Malaysia) Kelly Tan	67	−3
T3	(Spain) Carlota Ciganda	68	−2
T3	(United States) Cydney Clanton	68	−2
T3	(United States) Danielle Kang	68	−2
T3	(New Zealand) Lydia Ko	68	−2
T3	(Mexico) Gaby López	68	−2
T3	(Sweden) Linnea Ström	68	−2
T9	(Finland) Matilda Castren	69	−1
T9	(Sweden) Pernilla Lindberg	69	−1
T9	(Sweden) Anna Nordqvist	69	−1
T9	(South Korea) Amy Yang	69	−1

=== Second round ===
Friday, October 9, 2020

Place	Player	Score	To par
1	(South Korea) Kim Sei-young	71-65=136	−4
T2	(Spain) Carlota Ciganda	68-69=137	−3
T2	(United States) Danielle Kang	68-69=137	−3
T2	(United States) Jennifer Kupcho	72-65=137	−3
T2	(Sweden) Anna Nordqvist	69-68=137	−3
T6	(South Africa) Ashleigh Buhai	70-68=138	−2
T6	(New Zealand) Lydia Ko	68-70=138	−2
T6	(United States) Lauren Stephenson	70-68=138	−2
T6	(Sweden) Linnea Ström	68-70=138	−2
T6	(Malaysia) Kelly Tan	67-71=138	−2

=== Third round ===
Saturday, October 10, 2020

Place	Player	Score	To par
1	(South Korea) Kim Sei-young	71-65-67=203	−7
T2	(Canada) Brooke Henderson	71-69-65=205	−5
T2	(Sweden) Anna Nordqvist	69-68-68=205	−5
4	(South Korea) Inbee Park	70-70-66=206	−4
5	(Philippines) Bianca Pagdanganan	77-65-65=207	−3
T6	(Spain) Carlota Ciganda	68-69-71=208	−2
T6	(United States) Mina Harigae	74-68-66=208	−2
T6	(United States) Jennifer Kupcho	72-65-71=208	−2
T6	(Mexico) Gaby López	68-72-68=208	−2
10	(Japan) Nasa Hataoka	72-69-68=209	−1

=== Final round ===
Sunday, October 11, 2020

Place	Player	Score	To par	Money ($)
1	(South Korea) Kim Sei-young	71-65-67-63=266	−14	645,000
2	(South Korea) Inbee Park	70-70-66-65=271	−9	388,569
T3	(Spain) Carlota Ciganda	68-69-71-65=273	−7	249,967
T3	(Japan) Nasa Hataoka	72-69-68-64=273	−7	249,967
5	(Sweden) Anna Nordqvist	69-68-68-71=276	−4	175,511
6	(Canada) Brooke Henderson	71-69-65-72=277	−3	143,599
T7	(England) Charley Hull	70-71-69-69=279	−1	112,752
T7	(United States) Jennifer Kupcho	72-65-71-71=279	−1	112,752
T9	(United States) Brittany Lincicome	67-72-72-69=280	E	83,765
T9	(Mexico) Gaby López	68-72-68-72=280	E	83,765
T9	(Philippines) Bianca Pagdanganan	77-65-65-73=280	E	83,765
T9	(United States) Lauren Stephenson	70-68-74-68=280	E	83,765
