= Buffalo Hill Golf Club =

Golf course in Kalispell, Montana

- Location in the United States
- 48.2139°N 114.31541°W

Club information
- Location: Kalispell, Montana; United States
- Established: 1918
- Type: Parkland (public)
- Tota holes: 27
- Tournaments: Labor Day Tournament
- Website: Buffalo Hill GC

Championship Course
- Designed by: Robert Muir Graves
- Par: 72
- Length: 6,605 yd (6,040 m) Longest hole is #2 - 598 yd (547 m)
- Course rating: 71.9
- Slope rating: 121
- Course record: ^{‡} 64 – Scott Desmarais (Labor Day Tournament)

Buffalo Hill Golf Club is a public 27-hole parkland golf course located in Kalispell, Flathead County, Montana. The course was founded in 1918. Prior to becoming a golf course the land was owned by the affluent Conrad family^{†} and used as a buffalo pasture. The golf course is located 31 miles (50 km) southwest of Glacier National Park and 8 miles (13 km) north of Flathead Lake.

Dave Broeder—who was appointed as PGA head professional in 1990—had worked at the club since 1974. He announced his retirement in early 2018 and was succeeded by Casey Keyser. The Championship 18 Course at Buffalo Hill was designed by noted golf course architect Robert Muir Graves.

== History ==
In 1918, land was purchased where part of the Cameron 9-hole course now stands. The Cameron course is named for Dave Cameron, a former Kalispell mayor and early golf administrator in the area. Another nine holes were built with sand greens and no irrigation on the fairways. This 18-hole course continued to operate until the late 1930s when the Works Progress Administration (WPA) built the rustic log clubhouse. The WPA also improved the golf course by building a 9-hole irrigated grass course. Some holes are still in service today while others have been modified during subsequent expansions.

In 1964, the club made a major improvement with the construction of nine more holes, four of which are incorporated into the Championship 18 course. In 1974, members of the Kalispell Golf Association decided to expand the course to 27 holes with construction of new golf holes around and over the Stillwater River.

The nearly $1,000,000 expansion project, led by expansion committee chairman Otis Robbins, was financed by donations from the Buffalo Hill members, sales of debenture bonds, and matching funds from the Bureau of Outdoor Recreation. An 82-acre tract of land was donated by Kalispell furniture merchant Duane Bitney and businessman Sid Torgerson for the project.

PGA head professional George Haddow served at Buffalo Hill for 25 years. After Haddow's resignation in late 1976, Butte, Montana, native Charles "Skip" Koprivica was hired as the new head professional in December 1976. Kalispell native and LPGA Tour golf professional Alice Ritzman played the course in her youth before her successful career on the LPGA Tour.

== Championship 18 Course ==
On August 11, 1978 the legendary Arnold Palmer—accompanied by fellow PGA Tour professional Bob Dickson—was on hand to celebrate the Grand Opening of the "Championship 18 Golf Course". In 1967, Dickson became the first amateur golfer since 1935 to win both the U.S. Amateur and British Amateur. He turned professional and joined the PGA Tour in 1968. Mac McLendon had originally been scheduled to appear with Palmer for the dedication but could not attend due to a bout with tendonitis.

Designed by Robert Muir Graves—with the expert assistance of construction superintendent John Steidel—the course was referred to as a "monument" and rivals as one of the best golf courses in the Pacific Northwest. Since the 1990s the golf course has continued to make improvements by rebuilding tee boxes, upgrading irrigation systems, reshaping bunkers, improving sand quality and, most recently in 1999, rebuilding of four new greens on holes 12, 13, 16 and 17. In 2011, the Cameron 9-hole golf course was remodeled to accommodate a new driving range and practice facility.

== Tournaments hosted ==
Buffalo Hill Golf Club has hosted many important tournaments over the years. The club is best known for the annual "Labor Day International Classic" tournament which is a 54-hole event first played in 1939. Dozens of players from the Canadian province of Alberta attend each year along with a large contingent of local and regional players. The first round consists of two trips around the Cameron 9-hole course, which plays to a par 33, and the second and third rounds are contested on the Championship Course.

== Scorecard ==
Tee	Rating/Slope	1	2	3	4	5	6	7	8	9	Out	10	11	12	13	14	15	16	17	18	In	Total
Flathead	71.9/121	450	593	363	328	226	387	483	359	197	3393	416	535	109	441	349	470	164	405	323	3212	6605
Stillwater	70.4/119	408	583	329	311	196	368	463	336	179	3173	379	513	107	408	312	447	151	392	318	3026	6199
Whitefish	65.5/108	367	477	293	259	147	322	406	314	157	2742	345	439	85	352	257	381	115	309	254	2537	5279
SI	Men's	3	1	15	13	7	5	11	17	9		8	6	18	2	14	10	16	4	12
Par	Par	4	5	4	4	3	4	5	4	3	36	4	5	3	4	4	5	3	4	4	36	72
SI	Women's	9	1	7	17	15	3	5	11	13		6	4	18	12	8	10	16	2	14
Par	Par	5	5	4	4	3	4	5	4	3	37	4	5	3	5	4	5	3	4	4	37	74

== Course location ==
1176 N. Main Street
Kalispell, MT 59901

== Notes ==
^{‡} The tournament course record is 64 by Scott Desmarais of Calgary, Alberta, Canada. The non-tournament course record of 63 was posted by Logan Lindholm of Kalispell.
