= Thornberry Creek LPGA Classic =

Former golf tournament in Oneida, Wisconsin

Coordinates: 44.552°N 88.148°W

Tournament information
- Location: Oneida, Wisconsin, U.S.
- Established: 2017
- Course: Thornberry Creek at Oneida
- Par: 72
- Length: 6,624 yards (6,057 m)
- Tour: LPGA Tour
- Format: Stroke play – 72 holes
- Prize fund: $2.0 million
- Month played: July
- Final year: 2019

Tournament record score
- Aggregate: 257 Kim Sei-young (2018)
- To par: −31 as above

Current champion
- (China) Shanshan Feng

Location in the United States
Location in Wisconsin

The Thornberry Creek LPGA Classic was a women's professional golf tournament in Wisconsin on the LPGA Tour. It debuted in 2017 and was played at Thornberry Creek at Oneida, just northwest of Green Bay. Opened in 1994, the course is owned by the Oneida Nation.

On August 21, 2019, the Oneida Nation announced that due to the lack of return on the investment to run the event they were not going to renew their contract with the LPGA to continue the tournament.

The 2018 event saw Kim Sei-young post the lowest to-par score (−31) and the lowest 72-hole total score (257) in LPGA Tour history.

== Winners ==
Year	Dates	Champion	Country	Score	Margin of victory	Purse ($)	Winner's share ($)
2019	Jul 4–7	Shanshan Feng	China	259 (−29)	1 stroke	2,000,000	300,000
2018	Jul 5–8	Kim Sei-young	South Korea	257 (−31)	9 strokes	2,000,000	300,000
2017	Jul 6–9	Katherine Kirk	Australia	266 (−22)	1 stroke	2,000,000	300,000

== Tournament records ==
Year	Player	Score	Round
2019	Patty Tavatanakit	61 (−11)	4th
