= LPGA Mediheal Championship =

Women's professional golf tournament in California on the LPGA Tour

Coordinates: 37.6959°N 122.4728°W

Tournament information
- Location: Somis, California, U.S.
- Established: 2018
- Course: The Saticoy Club
- Par: 72
- Length: 6,551 yards (5,990 m)
- Tour: LPGA Tour
- Format: Stroke play – 72 holes
- Prize fund: $1.8 million
- Final year: 2022

Tournament record score
- Aggregate: 273 Jodi Ewart Shadoff (2022)
- To par: −15 as above

Final champion
- (England) Jodi Ewart Shadoff

Location in the United States
Location in California

The LPGA Mediheal Championship was a women's professional golf tournament in California on the LPGA Tour. A new event in 2018, it was held at Lake Merced Golf Club in Daly City, an adjacent suburb south of San Francisco. The course hosted the Swinging Skirts LPGA Classic for three years 2014–2016). In 2022, the event moved to The Saticoy Club in Somis and was played in October instead of May.

Lydia Ko won the first edition in a playoff over Minjee Lee; on the first extra hole, Ko made a short eagle putt after Lee had birdied.

== Winners ==
Year	Dates	Champion	Country	Winning score	To par	Margin of victory	Purse ($)	Winner's share ($)
2022	Oct 6–9	Jodi Ewart Shadoff	England	64-69-69-71=273	−15	1 stroke	1,800,000	270,000
2021	Jun 10–13	Matilda Castren	Finland	71-69-69-65=274	−14	2 strokes	1,500,000	225,000
2020	Cancelled due to the COVID-19 pandemic							
2019	May 2–5	Kim Sei-young	South Korea	72-66-68-75=281	−7	Playoff	1,800,000	270,000
2018	Apr 26–29	Lydia Ko	New Zealand	68-70-67-71=276	−12	Playoff	1,500,000	225,000

== Tournament records ==
Year	Player	Score	Round	Course
2021	Céline Boutier	64 (−8)	4th	Lake Merced GC
2022	Jodi Ewart Shadoff	64 (−8)	1st	The Saticoy Club
