= Jennifer Song =

American professional golfer

Jennifer Song 송민영
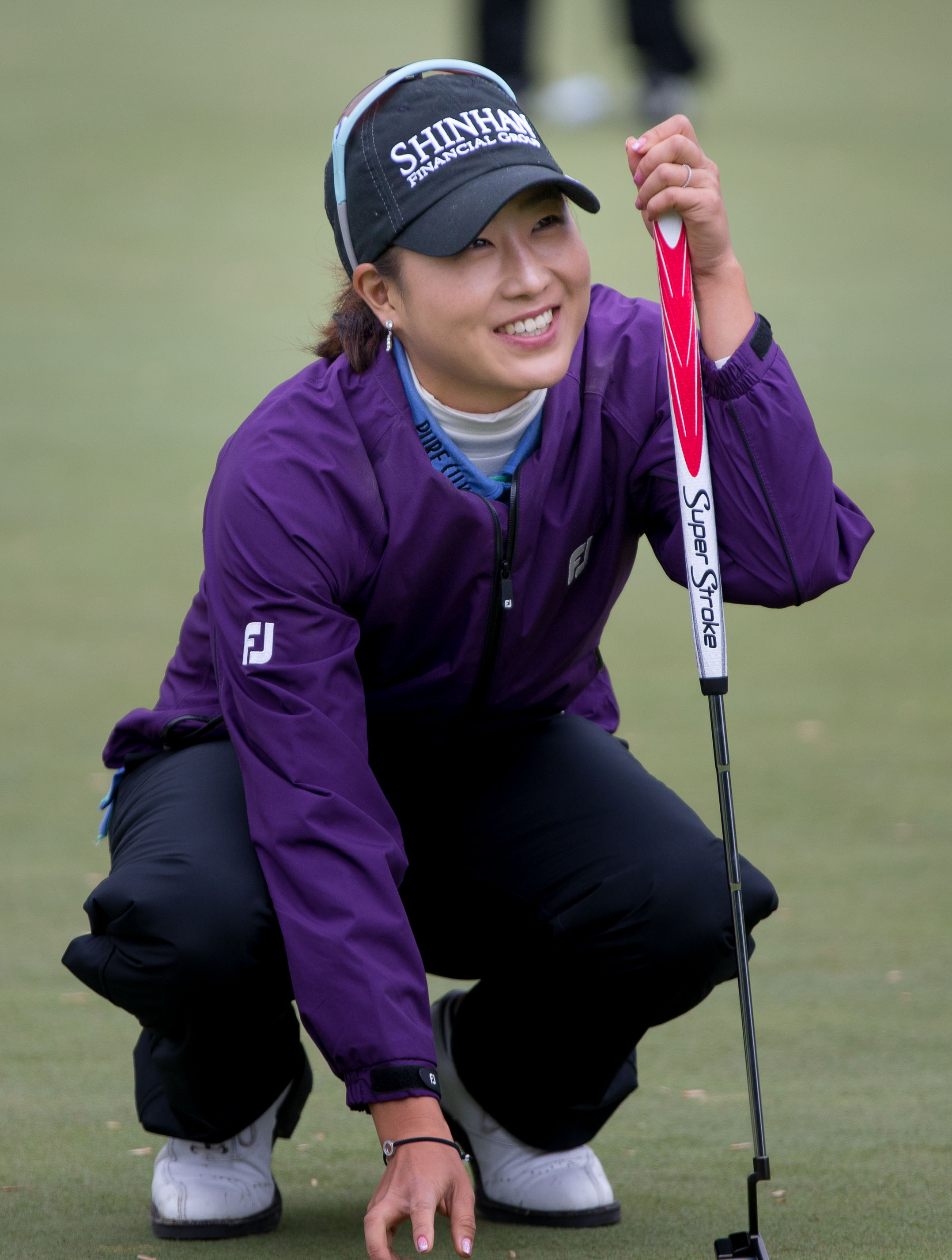

Personal information
- Full name: Jennifer Song
- Nationality: United States; South Korea
- Born: December 20, 1989 (age 36) Ann Arbor, Michigan, U.S.
- Height: 5 ft 6 in (1.68 m)

Career
- Sport: Golf
- College: University of Southern California (two years)
- Turned professional: 2010
- Current tour: LPGA Tour (since 2011)
- Former tour: Futures Tour (joined 2010)
- Professional wins: 2

Number of wins by tour
- Epson Tour: 2

Best results in LPGA major championships
- Chevron Championship: T2: 2018
- Women's PGA C'ship: T17: 2016
- U.S. Women's Open: T13: 2009
- Women's British Open: T7: 2020
- Evian Championship: 8th: 2017

Achievements and awards
- Futures Tour Rookie of the Year: 2010

- Jennifer Song
- Hangul: 송민영
- RR: Song Minyeong
- MR: Song Minyŏng

Jennifer Song (born December 20, 1989) is an American professional golfer currently playing on the LPGA Tour. In 2009, she won both the U.S. Women's Amateur Public Links and the U.S. Women's Amateur. She was only the fourth player in history to win both championships and the second player to win both in the same year.

== Early life ==
Song was born in Ann Arbor, Michigan while her father was a graduate student at the University of Michigan. She was raised in South Korea and holds dual Korean and United States citizenship. While in Korea, she attended Taejon Christian International School, Daejeon, Korea, where she excelled as a student-athlete and was a striker on the school's girls' soccer team. She was among the top goal scorers in the KAIAC Conference during her sophomore year.

While growing up in South Korea, Song played golf on the Korea National Team. In 2007, she tied for low amateur at the U.S. Women's Open and was the quarterfinalist at the U.S. Women's Amateur. In 2008, she again qualified for the U.S. Women's Open and U.S. Women's Amateur.

== Amateur career ==
Beginning in 2008, she was a member of the golf team at the University of Southern California (USC). During her freshman year at USC in 2008-2009, Song had eight top-ten finishes in ten starts and finished the season as the number three ranked player in the country. She was named Freshman of the Year, All-American, All-Pac-10 Freshman of the Year and All-Pac-10. She also set the all-time single-season stroke average record. In the summer of 2009, Song finished low amateur at T-13 in the U.S. Women's Open, and won both the U.S. Women's Amateur Public Links and the U.S. Women's Amateur.

In her sophomore year, she was again named All-American after tying for fifth at the NCAA Championships and leading USC to within a stroke of first place. She was voted Pac-10 Golfer of the Year, and was the third-ranked golfer in the country for the second year in a row. She finished her college career with a scoring average of 71.59, as well as her 15 career rounds in the 60s, all of which set USC school records. In October 2009, she accepted a sponsor's exemption to the LPGA Hana Bank Championship where she finished in 65th place out of 71 players. In April 2010, she qualified for the Kraft Nabisco Championship, one of four majors on the LPGA Tour. She finished tied for 21st place and was the low amateur at the tournament.

She finished her amateur career by representing the United States on the winning 2010 Curtis Cup team.

== Professional career ==
Song turned professional immediately following the 2010 Curtis Cup Match, which concluded on June 13, 2010. She began playing full-time on the Duramed Futures Tour, of which she had been a member since June 2009, qualifying while still an amateur. She won her first event as a professional, the 2010 Tate & Lyle Players Championship, the sole major tournament on the Futures Tour. She won again in 2010 on the Futures Tour at the Greater Richmond Golf Classic to move into fourth place on the 2010 Futures Tour money list after playing in only eight events.

She finished the 2010 season in second place on the Futures Tour money list which earned her full playing privileges on the LPGA Tour for 2011. She was also named Futures Tour Rookie of the Year.

In April 2018, Song finished as a runner-up at the ANA Inspiration, losing in a sudden-death playoff. In a playoff that included Pernilla Lindberg and Inbee Park, Song was eliminated on the third extra hole, when she could only make a par to the others' birdies. Previously, on the second extra hole, Song had a putt to win the championship, but missed to the right of the hole.

== Awards and honors ==
In 2010, she earned Futures Tour Rookie of the Year honors.

== Professional wins (2) ==
=== Futures Tour wins (2) ===
| No. | Date | Tournament | Winning score | Margin of victory | Runner-up |
|---|---|---|---|---|---|
| 1 | Jun 20, 2010 | **Tate & Lyle Players Championship** | –19 (68-67-65-61=261) | 6 strokes | (United States) Esther Choe |
| 2 | Aug 16, 2010 | Greater Richmond Golf Classic | –12 (68-70-66=204) | Playoff | (South Korea) Jenny Shin |

Futures Tour major championship is shown in bold.

LPGA Tour playoff record (0–1)

| No. | Year | Tournament | Opponent(s) | Result |
|---|---|---|---|---|
| 1 | 2018 | **ANA Inspiration** | (Sweden) Pernilla Lindberg (South Korea) Inbee Park | Lindberg won with birdie on eighth extra hole Song eliminated by birdie on third hole |

== Results in LPGA majors ==
Results not in chronological order.

| Tournament | 2007 | 2008 | 2009 | 2010 | 2011 | 2012 |
|---|---|---|---|---|---|---|
| Chevron Championship | | | | T21LA | | T56 |
| U.S. Women's Open | T39LA | CUT | T13LA | T58 | CUT | T46 |
| Women's PGA Championship | | | | | T30 | CUT |
| Women's British Open | | | | | CUT | CUT |

| Tournament | 2013 | 2014 | 2015 | 2016 | 2017 | 2018 | 2019 | 2020 | 2021 | 2022 | 2023 | 2024 |
|---|---|---|---|---|---|---|---|---|---|---|---|---|
| Chevron Championship | CUT | | T46 | T36 | T35 | T2 | T26 | CUT | 69 | CUT | CUT | CUT |
| U.S. Women's Open | | T38 | CUT | T55 | T48 | T25 | CUT | T54 | CUT | | | |
| Women's PGA Championship | CUT | T30 | T34 | T17 | CUT | CUT | T60 | T33 | CUT | T68 | CUT | CUT |
| The Evian Championship ^ | CUT | T41 | T16 | T17 | 8 | T49 | CUT | NT | T38 | CUT | | |
| Women's British Open | | | T47 | T43 | T16 | CUT | CUT | T7 | CUT | | | |

^ The Evian Championship was added as a major in 2013.

Top 10
Did not play

LA = low amateur
CUT = missed the half-way cut
NT = no tournament
T = tied

=== Summary ===
| Tournament | Wins | 2nd | 3rd | Top-5 | Top-10 | Top-25 | Events | Cuts made |
|---|---|---|---|---|---|---|---|---|
| Chevron Championship | 0 | 1 | 0 | 1 | 1 | 2 | 13 | 8 |
| U.S. Women's Open | 0 | 0 | 0 | 0 | 0 | 2 | 14 | 9 |
| Women's PGA Championship | 0 | 0 | 0 | 0 | 0 | 1 | 14 | 7 |
| The Evian Championship | 0 | 0 | 0 | 0 | 1 | 3 | 9 | 6 |
| Women's British Open | 0 | 0 | 0 | 0 | 1 | 2 | 9 | 4 |
| Totals | 0 | 1 | 0 | 1 | 3 | 10 | 59 | 34 |

- Most consecutive cuts made – 8 (2015 British Open – 2017 ANA)
- Longest streak of top-10s – 2 (2017 Evian – 2018 ANA)

== LPGA Tour career summary ==
| Year | Tournaments played | Cuts made | Wins | 2nd | 3rd | Top 10s | Best finish | Earnings ($) | Money list rank | Scoring average | Scoring rank |
|---|---|---|---|---|---|---|---|---|---|---|---|
| 2007 | 1 | 1 | 0 | 0 | 0 | 0 | T39 | n/a | n/a | 73.50^{1} | n/a |
| 2008 | 1 | 0 | 0 | 0 | 0 | 0 | MC | n/a | n/a | 77.50^{1} | n/a |
| 2009 | 2 | 2 | 0 | 0 | 0 | 0 | T13 | n/a | n/a | 74.29^{1} | n/a |
| 2010 | 5 | 5 | 0 | 0 | 0 | 0 | T15 | 45,406^{1} | n/a | 73.25^{1} | n/a |
| 2011 | 15 | 10 | 0 | 0 | 0 | 0 | T16 | 77,421 | 79 | 72.89 | 60 |
| 2012 | 22 | 13 | 0 | 0 | 0 | 1 | T6 | 128,280 | 71 | 73.19 | 81 |
| 2013 | 17 | 5 | 0 | 0 | 0 | 0 | T18 | 36,216 | 108 | 73.03 | 97 |
| 2014 | 19 | 12 | 0 | 0 | 0 | 0 | T23 | 124,446 | 83 | 72.16 | 63 |
| 2015 | 27 | 16 | 0 | 0 | 0 | 0 | T11 | 260,495 | 67 | 72.22 | 69 |
| 2016 | 25 | 21 | 0 | 0 | 1 | 1 | 3 | 390,501 | 46 | 71.56 | 46 |
| 2017 | 29 | 22 | 0 | 0 | 0 | 2 | 4 | 423,486 | 48 | 71.40 | 52 |
| 2018 | 24 | 18 | 0 | 1 | 1 | 3 | T2 | 626,263 | 33 | 71.44 | 50 |
| 2019 | 21 | 16 | 0 | 0 | 0 | 1 | 8 | 160,531 | 85 | 71.78 | 89 |
| 2020 | 16 | 12 | 0 | 0 | 1 | 4 | 3 | 393,883 | 27 | 71.09 | 18 |
| 2021 | 22 | 16 | 0 | 0 | 0 | 1 | T8 | 208,491 | 82 | 71.49 | 76 |
| 2022 | 22 | 13 | 0 | 0 | 0 | 0 | T12 | 122,132 | 110 | 72.22 | 116 |
| 2023 | 18 | 7 | 0 | 0 | 0 | 0 | T27 | 54,247 | 155 | 72.60 | 127 |
| 2024 | 18 | 2 | 0 | 0 | 0 | 0 | T31 | 22,558 | 179 | 73.56 | 158 |
| 2025 | 3 | 0 | 0 | 0 | 0 | 0 | MC | 0 | n/a | 75.50 | n/a |

Official as of the 2025 season
^{1} Not a member of the LPGA in this year. Scoring average and earnings not official.

== Team appearances ==
Amateur

- Curtis Cup (representing the United States): 2010 (winners)

=== Curtis Cup record ===
| Year | Total matches | Total W–L–H | Singles W–L–H | Foursomes W–L–H | Fourballs W–L–H | Points won | Points % |
|---|---|---|---|---|---|---|---|
| 2010 | 5 | **2–2–1** | **0–1–0** lost to D. McVeigh 3&2 | **1–0–1** halved w/ J. Johnson, won w/ S. Kono 3&1 | **1–1–0** lost w/ K. Kim 4&3, won w/ C. Clanton 2&1 | 3.0 | 60.0 |
