= Meijer LPGA Classic =

Golf tournament

Coordinates: 43.066°N 85.581°W

Tournament information
- Location: Belmont, Michigan, U.S.
- Established: 2014
- Course: Blythefield Country Club
- Par: 72
- Length: 6,638 yards (6,070 m)
- Tour: LPGA Tour
- Format: Stroke play – 72 holes
- Prize fund: $3.0 million
- Month played: June

Tournament record score
- Aggregate: 263 Nelly Korda (2021)
- To par: −25 as above

Current champion
- (Japan) Miyū Yamashita

Location in the United States
Location in Michigan

The Meijer LPGA Classic is a women's professional golf tournament in Michigan on the LPGA Tour. Founded in 2014, it is played at Blythefield Country Club in Belmont, a suburb northeast of Grand Rapids.

Mirim Lee won the inaugural tournament in a playoff with Inbee Park for her first LPGA Tour win.

Nelly Korda won her second LPGA tournament in 2021, finishing with a new Meijer record of 263, winning by two strokes over Leona Maguire. A round record, which tied two others in past years, of 62 on Saturday gave her a three-stroke lead (196 to 199) from her 62 to Maguire's 70, after trailing Maguire by five strokes (134 to 129) after the second round. Korda was ranked #4 in the world, won her fifth LPGA title. Korda eagled the par-5 14th hole, to go with six birdies and three bogeys. In the final round, Korda led by just one stroke going to the 18th hole, which she birdied for her two-stroke win. Her 263 for the 72 holes also set a new tournament record as was her 25 strokes below par.

The Meijer LPGA Classic for Simply Give is put on in order to raise money and, help stock shelves for local food pantries. Since 2008 Meijer has been able to raise over 100 million dollars.

Tournament names through the years:

- 2014–2015: Meijer LPGA Classic presented by Kraft
- 2016–present: Meijer LPGA Classic for Simply Give

== Course ==
Hole	Yards	Par	Hole	Yards	Par
1	344	4	10	544	5
2	406	4	11	165	3
3	425	4	12	406	4
4	551	5	13	229	3
5	131	3	14	554	5
6	390	4	15	170	3
7	171	3	16	378	4
8	475	5	17	400	4
9	420	4	18	479	5
Out	3,313	36	In	3,325	36
Source:			Total	6,638	72

== Winners ==
Year	Date	Champion	Country	Winning score	To par	Margin of victory	Purse ($)	Winner's share ($)
2026	Jun 21	Miyū Yamashita	Japan	72-68-67-64=271	−17	Playoff	3,000,000	450,000
2025	Jun 15	Carlota Ciganda	Spain	69-67-69-67=272	−16	1 stroke	3,000,000	450,000
2024	Jun 16	Lilia Vu	United States	69-70-68-65=272	−16	Playoff	3,000,000	450,000
2023	Jun 18	Leona Maguire	Ireland	69-65-69-64=267	−21	2 strokes	2,500,000	375,000
2022	Jun 19	Jennifer Kupcho	United States	63-67-69-71=270	−18	Playoff	2,500,000	375,000
2021	Jun 20	Nelly Korda	United States	68-66-62-67=263	−25	2 strokes	2,300,000	345,000
2019	Jun 16	Brooke Henderson (2)	Canada	64-64-69-70=267	−21	1 stroke	2,000,000	300,000
2018	Jun 17	Ryu So-yeon	South Korea	64-67-69-67=267	−21	2 strokes	2,000,000	300,000
2017	Jun 18	Brooke Henderson	Canada	63-67-67-66=263	−17*	2 strokes	2,000,000	300,000
2016	Jun 19	Kim Sei-young	South Korea	65-69-65-68=267	−17	Playoff	2,000,000	300,000
2015	Jul 26	Lexi Thompson	United States	69-64-68-65=266	−18	1 stroke	2,000,000	300,000
2014	Aug 10	Mirim Lee	South Korea	70-64-67-69=270	−14	Playoff	1,500,000	225,000

* Par for rounds 3 and 4 in 2017 lowered to 69 due to course flooding;
5th hole was converted from a par 5 to a par 3.

== Tournament records ==
Year	Player	Score	Round
2018	Ariya Jutanugarn	62 (−10)	4th
2019	Lexi Thompson	62 (−10)	3rd
2021	Nelly Korda	62 (−10)	3rd
