= Hall W. Thompson =

- Born: May 28, 1923; Nashville, Tennessee, U.S.
- Died: October 27, 2010 (aged 87)
- Education: Vanderbilt University
- Occupations: Businessman; golf course developer
- Spouse: Lucille
- Children: 5

Hall W. Thompson (May 28, 1923 – October 27, 2010) was an American businessman and golf course developer.

== Biography ==
=== Early life ===
Hall W. Thompson was born on May 28, 1923, in Nashville, Tennessee. He attended Vanderbilt University. During the Second World War, he served in the United States Army Air Corps in the Pacific Ocean.

=== Business ===
While at Vanderbilt, he started working at General Truck Sales, the nation's largest privately owned GMC truck outlet. In 1957, he purchased the north Alabama dealership for Caterpillar Inc. and called it Thompson Tractor. New tractor facilities were built in Anniston, Decatur and Tuscaloosa. In 1987, his son Michael took over, and it became the authorized dealer for south Alabama and the panhandle of Florida, employing 1,230 people.

He served on the Boards of Directors of AmSouth Bank, South Central Bell, BellSouth Telecommunications, Protective Life Corporation, and Alabama By-Products Corporation. He also served on the board of trustees of the Crippled Children's Foundation and he was the past director of the Birmingham Chamber of Commerce, the State Chamber of Commerce, and Associated Industries of Alabama. He served on the Board of Trustees of his alma mater, Vanderbilt University, until his retirement in 1993. He was a member of the Birmingham Rotary Club.

=== Golf ===
He developed and established the Shoal Creek Golf and Country Club in Birmingham, Alabama, in 1977 as an invitation-only private golf club. The course held a number of notable tournaments, with major events such as the 1984 PGA Championship won by Lee Trevino passing without incident. In the months before the 1990 PGA Championship which was to be played in August at the club, Thompson was approached by a reporter from the Birmingham Post-Herald who asked about the club's admission policies, with Thompson noting the inclusion of Jews and women as members, saying that "we don't discriminate in every other area except blacks". Civil rights organizations announced that they would stage protests.

IBM and other key corporate sponsors such as American Honda Motor Company, Lincoln-Mercury and Toyota pulled out of the television advertising during the tournament, costing the tournament's broadcasters ABC and ESPN an estimated $2 million in advertising revenue. On July 31, in an agreement reached between the club, the PGA and the Southern Christian Leadership Conference, Shoal Creek announced that it would begin accepting blacks as members. Following the agreement, the National Association for the Advancement of Colored People announced that it too would not conduct protests at the club. The tournament went off in the absence of any confrontations. Sports Illustrated called Thompson "Alabama's second-most-effective catalyst for change in race relations" after Rosa Parks, noting that the effect of his remarks led to club's admission of Louis J. Willie, president of the Booker T. Washington Insurance Company as an honorary member, meaning that he would not have to pay the club's standard $35,000 initiation fee and paved the way for the sport's governing bodies to end play at clubs that practiced discrimination.

He remained involved with the Shoal Creek club until his death, and saw the admission of members such as former United States Secretary of State Condoleezza Rice. A junior amateur tournament was held at the club in 2008, and in 2010 Shoal Creek the PGA Champions Tour announced it would move one of its major tour events, The Tradition (now to be called "The Regions Tradition") to the club in 2011. He was a member of the Augusta National Golf Club.

His remarks led to greater introspection by the golf world regarding the membership policies at the clubs that serve as tournament hosts, with an official at the USGA estimating that 75% of private clubs in the United States in 1990 had membership policies that exclude minorities and women. As part of an effort that "helps change the climate" executive director David B. Fay of the United States Golf Association, the organization that sets rules for the sport and operates the U.S. Open, the second of the four major championships, announced new regulations in November under which the USGA would not hold tournaments at private clubs that discriminate against women or minorities. The PGA Tour and the PGA of America had already announced in August that clubs that discriminated based on race, religion or sex would not be accepted as sites for the 120 tournaments conducted each year.

=== Personal life ===
He died at the age of 87 on October 27, 2010. He was survived by his wife, Lucille, as well as by two daughters, three sons and eight grandchildren. He was honored as Alabama's first "Distinguished Sportsman" by the Alabama Sports Hall of Fame and he was inducted in the Alabama Academy of Honor.
