= Shoal Creek Club =

Private golf club near Birmingham, AL, US

- Interactive map of Shoal Creek Club

Club information
- Location: Shoal Creek, Alabama, U.S.
- Established: 1977
- Type: Private
- Total holes: 18
- Tournaments: PGA Championship (1984, 1990); U.S. Amateur (1986); U.S. Junior Amateur (2008); U.S. Women's Open (2018)
- Greens: Tifeagle Bermuda
- Fairways: Stadium Zoysia
- Designed by: Jack Nicklaus (1977) Andrew Green (2026)
- Par: 72
- Length: 7,400 yards
- Course rating: 76.2
- Slope rating: 145

Shoal Creek Club is an invitation-only private golf club in the southeastern United States, located in Shelby County, Alabama, southeast of Birmingham. Opened 49 years ago in 1977, the course was designed by Jack Nicklaus and is rated as the top golf course in the state. Shoal Creek is consistently listed as one of United States top courses, most recently being ranked #50 in Golf Digest and #70 in Golf Week.

== Tournaments ==
Shoal Creek has played host to numerous PGA, USGA, and NCAA events, including the PGA Championship (1984, 1990), the U.S. Amateur (1986), and the U.S. Junior Amateur (2008). It hosted the Regions Tradition, a senior major for five years (2011–2015), until its move to Greystone Country Club, a few minutes down the road. Shoal Creek hosted the U.S. Women's Open in 2018.

In addition, the course has been the site of USGA qualifiers for the U.S. Amateur, U.S. Mid-Amateur, and U.S. Junior Amateur, as well as the Southern Golf Association Championship. Other tournaments hosted there include the 1978 Southeastern Conference Championship, the Jerry Pate Intercollegiate Tournament (1992–1996), the Women's Alabama Golf Association Junior Championship (1992), the Birmingham Golf Association Junior Championship (2001), and its own Shoal Creek Senior Invitational since 1998.

== Course ==
There are several sets of tees; the back tees (5 star) are at 7,400 yards (6,767 m)
with a course rating of 76.2 and a slope rating of 145.

Hole	Yards	Par	Hole	Yards	Par
1	405	4	10	430	4
2	415	4	11	525	5
3	530	5	12	520	4
4	480	4	13	215	3
5	220	3	14	390	4
6	540	5	15	425	4
7	470	4	16	215	3
8	165	3	17	550	5
9	455	4	18	450	4
Out	3,680	36	In	3,720	36
Source:		Total		7,400	72

== Membership ==
Up until 1990, Shoal Creek had no African-American members. A firestorm began when the Birmingham Post-Herald reported that club founder Hall Thompson commented that the club would not be pressured to accept African-American members, stating "this is our home, and we pick and choose who we want." Although Thompson insisted that he had been misquoted, these comments, made prior to the 1990 PGA Championship, made the tournament front-page news as civil rights groups such as the Southern Christian Leadership Conference threatened to protest the event and sponsors pulled advertising from the tournament. The PGA considered moving the tournament away from Shoal Creek, but in the end reached a compromise with the club: local insurance executive Louis J. Willie was invited by the mayor of Birmingham to become an honorary member with full membership to come after the waiting-list period of any membership application. Willie was also the first black member of the Kiwanis Club of Birmingham, The Downtown Club and The Club, Inc. all civic and social clubs.

This incident forced everyone associated with golf – clubs, the PGA, and the USGA – to look at minority access in the sport. The PGA and USGA changed rules regarding course selection, requiring clubs that hosted events to meet inclusive membership requirements.

In 1994, four years after the 1990 incident, Willie remained the only black member of Shoal Creek. In October of that year, sensational young golfer Tiger Woods won the individual intercollegiate championship by two strokes and led Stanford to team victory in the Jerry Pate National Intercollegiate tournament held at Shoal Creek. At this time, Shoal Creek founder Hall Thompson said of Woods, "You're a great player, I'm proud of you. You're superb." Shoal Creek hosted no more major golf events until the 2008 U.S. Junior Amateur.

In regards to membership, Shoal Creek has welcomed some African Americans (two women) and Jews as members. In September 2009, Condoleezza Rice, the former United States Secretary of State under President George W. Bush became a full member of Shoal Creek. To date, only two women have been allowed to join. Rice is originally from the Birmingham, Alabama area. In addition to joining Shoal Creek, Rice became a member of Greystone Golf & Country Club. On August 20, 2012, Rice was one of the first two women admitted to Augusta National Golf Club.
