= 2018 ANA Inspiration =

Tournament information
- Dates: March 29 – April 2, 2018
- Location: Rancho Mirage, California; 33.798°N 116.433°W
- Courses: Mission Hills Country Club; Dinah Shore Tournament Course
- Tour: LPGA Tour
- Format: Stroke play - 72 holes

Statistics
- Par: 72
- Length: 6,763 yards (6,184 m)
- Field: 117 players, 76 after cut
- Cut: 145 (+1)
- Prize fund: $2.8 million
- Winner's share: $420,000

Champion
- (Sweden) Pernilla Lindberg
- 273 (−15), playoff
- Location in the United States Location in California

The 2018 ANA Inspiration was the 47th ANA Inspiration LPGA golf tournament, held March 29 – April 2, 2018 at the Dinah Shore Tournament Course of Mission Hills Country Club in Rancho Mirage, California. It was its 36th year as a major championship, and Golf Channel televised the event for the eighth consecutive year.

Pernilla Lindberg gained her first professional victory in a three-player sudden-death playoff that extended to eight extra holes.

== Field ==
Players who have qualified for the event are listed below. Players are listed under the first category in which they qualified; additional qualifying categories are shown in parentheses.

1. Active LPGA Tour Hall of Fame members (must have participated in ten official LPGA Tour tournaments within the 12 months prior to the commitment deadline)

Karrie Webb (2,8) – did not play

2. Winners of all previous ANA Inspirations

Donna Andrews, Juli Inkster, Lydia Ko (4,5,6,7,8,9), Stacy Lewis (3,5,8,9), Brittany Lincicome (5,8), Inbee Park (3,5,6,8,9), Morgan Pressel (8), Ryu So-yeon (5,6,7,8,9), Lexi Thompson (5,6,8,9), Yani Tseng, Yoo Sun-young (8)

3. Winners of the U.S. Women's Open, Women's PGA Championship, and Ricoh Women's British Open in the previous five years

Chun In-gee (4,5,6,8,9), Brooke Henderson (5,6,7,8,9), Ariya Jutanugarn (5,6,8,9), Danielle Kang (5,7,8,9), In-Kyung Kim (5,7,8,9), Brittany Lang (5,8), Mo Martin (8), Park Sung-hyun (5,6,7,8,9,12), Michelle Wie (5,6,7,8,9)

4. Winners of The Evian Championship in the previous five years

Kim Hyo-joo (5,8), Anna Nordqvist (5,6,7,8,9)

Suzann Pettersen (5,6,8) – did not play

5. Winners of official LPGA Tour tournaments from the 2015 ANA Inspiration through the week immediately preceding the 2018 ANA Inspiration

Choi Na-yeon, Carlota Ciganda (7,8,9,10-LET), Shanshan Feng (7,8,9), Charley Hull (6,8,9), Jang Ha-na (8,9), Ji Eun-hee (8), Cristie Kerr (6,8,9), Kim Sei-young (7,8,9), Katherine Kirk (7,8), Ko Jin-young (9), Jessica Korda (6,8,9), Mirim Lee (6,8,9), Minjee Lee (6,8,9), Lee Mi-hyang (7,8), Caroline Masson (7,8), Haru Nomura (8), Jenny Shin (8), Kris Tamulis, Amy Yang (6,7,8,9)

Ahn Sun-ju – did not play

6. All players who finished in the top-20 in the previous year's ANA Inspiration

Austin Ernst (8), M. J. Hur (7,8), Karine Icher (8)

7. All players who finished in the top-5 of the previous year's U.S. Women's Open, Women's PGA Championship, Ricoh Women's British Open and The Evian Championship

Brittany Altomare (8), Choi Hye-jin (9), Chella Choi (8), Jodi Ewart Shadoff (8), Georgia Hall (10-LET), Moriya Jutanugarn (8,9), Lee Jeong-eun (9,10-KLPGA)

8. Top-80 on the previous year's season-ending LPGA Tour official money list

Marina Alex, Nicole Broch Larsen, Ashleigh Buhai, Pei-Yun Chien, Cydney Clanton, Jacqui Concolino, Sandra Gal, Jaye Marie Green, Wei-Ling Hsu, Tiffany Joh, Kim Kaufman, Megan Khang, Nelly Korda, Olafia Kristinsdottir, Candie Kung, Lee Jeong-eun, Pernilla Lindberg, Gaby López, Ally McDonald, Azahara Muñoz, Su-Hyun Oh, Ryann O'Toole, Jane Park, Pornanong Phatlum, Beatriz Recari, Madelene Sagström, Lizette Salas (9), Alena Sharp, Sarah Jane Smith, Jennifer Song, Angela Stanford, Ayako Uehara, Jing Yan, Angel Yin

Laura Gonzalez Escallon, Gerina Piller – did not play

9. Top-30 on the Women's World Golf Rankings as of a March 11, 2018
Ai Suzuki (10-JLPGA)

Jiyai Shin – did not play

10. Top-2 players from the previous year's season-ending Ladies European Tour Order of Merit, LPGA of Japan Tour money list and LPGA of Korea Tour money list

Kim Ji-hyun

Lee Min-young – did not play

11. Top-20 players plus ties on the current year LPGA Tour official money list at the end of the last official tournament prior to the current ANA Inspiration, not otherwise qualified above, provided such players are within the top-80 positions on the current year LPGA Tour official money list at the beginning of the tournament competition

Aditi Ashok, Laetitia Beck, Laura Davies, Hannah Green, Nasa Hataoka, Caroline Inglis, Cindy LaCrosse, Bronte Law, Erynee Lee, Nanna Koerstz Madsen, Amy Olson, Park Hee-young, Mariah Stackhouse, Emma Talley, Mariajo Uribe, Lindsey Weaver

12. Previous year's Louise Suggs Rolex Rookie of the Year

Already qualified

13. Previous year's U.S. Women's Amateur champion, provided she is still an amateur at the beginning of tournament competition

Sophia Schubert (a)

14. Any LPGA Member who did not compete in the previous year's ANA Inspiration major due to injury, illness or maternity, who subsequently received a medical/maternity extension of membership from the LPGA in the previous calendar year, provided they were otherwise qualified to compete in the previous year's ANA Inspiration

Sydnee Michaels

15. Up to six sponsor invitations for top-ranked amateur players

María Fassi (a), Lucy Li (a), Atthaya Thitikul (a), Albane Valenzuela (a), Lilia Vu (a), Rose Zhang

Unknown category
Paula Creamer, Catriona Matthew, Florentyna Parker, Emily Kristine Pedersen, Melissa Reid

== Round summaries ==
=== First round ===
Thursday, March 29, 2018

Place	Player	Score	To par
1	(Sweden) Pernilla Lindberg	65	−7
T2	(Spain) Beatriz Recari	66	−6
T2	(Japan) Ayako Uehara	66	−6
T4	(South Korea) Jang Ha-na	67	−5
T4	(United States) Jessica Korda	67	−5
T4	(Switzerland) Albane Valenzuela (a)	67	−5
T7	(United States) Brittany Altomare	68	−4
T7	(South Korea) Chella Choi	68	−4
T7	(South Korea) Chun In-gee	68	−4
T7	(South Korea) Park Sung-hyun	68	−4
T7	(United States) Lexi Thompson	68	−4
T7	(South Korea) Yoo Sun-young	68	−4

=== Second round ===
Friday, March 30, 2018

Place	Player	Score	To par
T1	(Sweden) Pernilla Lindberg	65-67=132	−12
T1	(South Korea) Park Sung-hyun	68-64=132	−12
3	(United States) Jessica Korda	67-68=135	−9
T4	(England) Charley Hull	69-68=137	−7
T4	(United States) Amy Olson	69-68=137	−7
T4	(England) Jodi Ewart Shadoff	70-67=137	−7
T4	(Japan) Ayako Uehara	66-71=137	−7
T8	(Spain) Beatriz Recari	66-72=138	−6
T8	(United States) Jennifer Song	69-69=138	−6
T8	(Switzerland) Albane Valenzuela (a)	67-71=138	−6

=== Third round ===
Saturday, March 31, 2018

Place	Player	Score	To par
1	(Sweden) Pernilla Lindberg	65-67-70=202	−14
2	(United States) Amy Olson	69-68-68=205	−11
T3	(England) Charley Hull	69-68-69=206	−10
T3	(Thailand) Moriya Jutanugarn	70-70-66=206	−10
T3	(South Korea) Inbee Park	70-69-67=206	−10
T3	(South Korea) Park Sung-hyun	68-64-74=206	−10
T3	(England) Jodi Ewart Shadoff	70-67-69=206	−10
T3	(United States) Jennifer Song	69-69-68=206	−10
9	(Japan) Ayako Uehara	66-71-70=207	−9
T10	(China) Shanshan Feng	71-70-67=208	−8
T10	(United States) Jessica Korda	67-68-73=208	−8

=== Final round ===
Sunday, April 1, 2018

Place	Player	Score	To par	Money ($)
T1	(Sweden) Pernilla Lindberg	65-67-70-71=273	−15	Playoff
T1	(South Korea) Inbee Park	70-69-67-67=273	−15	Playoff
T1	(United States) Jennifer Song	69-69-68-67-273	−15	Playoff
T4	(United States) Jessica Korda	67-68-73-66=274	−14	131,943
T4	(Thailand) Ariya Jutanugarn	72-69-68-65-274	−14	131,943
T6	(England) Charley Hull	69-68-69-69=275	−13	88,437
T6	(Thailand) Moriya Jutanugarn	70-70-66-69=275	−13	88,437
8	(Japan) Ayako Uehara	66-71-70-69=276	−12	70,608
T9	(Germany) Caroline Masson	72-68-69-68=277	−11	56,165
T9	(England) Jodi Ewart Shadoff	70-67-69-71=277	−11	56,165
T9	(United States) Amy Olson	69-68-68-72=277	−11	56,165
T9	(South Korea) Park Sung-hyun	68-64-74-71=277	−11	56,165

Amateurs: Thitikul (−5), Vu (−3), Valenzuela (E), Zhang (+1)

==== Scorecard ====
Final round

Hole	1	2	3	4	5	6	7	8	9	10	11	12	13	14	15	16	17	18
Par	4	5	4	4	3	4	4	3	5	4	5	4	4	3	4	4	3	5
(Sweden) Lindberg	−13	−13	−12	−12	−12	−12	−12	−13	−13	−14	−14	−14	−14	−14	−14	−14	−14	−15
(South Korea) Park	−10	−11	−11	−12	−12	−12	−13	−12	−12	−12	−12	−12	−13	−14	−14	−13	−14	−15
(United States) Song	−10	−11	−11	−11	−11	−11	−11	−12	−13	−14	−14	−14	−14	−14	−14	−14	−14	−15
(United States) Korda	−8	−9	−9	−10	−9	−10	−11	−11	−13	−13	−14	−12	−13	−14	−14	−13	−13	−14
(Thailand) A. Jutanugarn	−7	−9	−8	−9	−9	−9	−9	−10	−10	−11	−11	−12	−12	−12	−12	−13	−14	−14
(England) Hull	−10	−11	−9	−9	−9	−9	−9	−9	−10	−11	−11	−11	−12	−12	−12	−12	−12	−13
(Thailand) M. Jutanugarn	−10	−11	−11	−12	−12	−12	−12	−12	−13	−12	−13	−12	−12	−12	−13	−13	−13	−13
(United States) Olson	−11	−12	−12	−12	−11	−11	−10	−10	−10	−10	−9	−9	−9	−10	−10	−9	−10	−11

Cumulative tournament scores, relative to par

Eagle	Birdie	Bogey	Double bogey

=== Playoff ===
Sunday, April 1, 2018
Monday, April 2, 2018

Pernilla Lindberg, Inbee Park, and Jennifer Song were tied after 72 holes at 273 (−15). The sudden-death playoff was on the 18th hole, and all three players made par fives during the first two extra holes. Lindberg and Park birdied on their third attempts, while Song made par and was eliminated. On the fourth extra hole in near dark conditions, both Lindberg and Park made par with temporary lighting on the green.

Play resumed at 8 am PDT Monday on the par-4 10th hole, then proceeded to the par-3 17th and par-5 18th. Still tied after seven extra holes, they returned to the tenth hole, where Lindberg sank a 30-foot (9 m) birdie putt and Park missed from 20 feet (6 m).

Place	Player	To par	Money ($)
1	(Sweden) Pernilla Lindberg	–2	420,000
T2	(South Korea) Inbee Park	–1	223,635
T2	(United States) Jennifer Song	E	223,635

Hole	18	18	18	18	10	17	18	10
Par	5	5	5	5	4	3	5	4
(Sweden) Lindberg	5	5	4	5	4	3	5	3
(South Korea) Park	5	5	4	5	4	3	5	4
(United States) Song	5	5	5					
