= Blythefield Country Club =

Private golf course

- Location within the United States Location within Michigan
- 43.066°N 85.581°W

Club information
- Location: Belmont, Michigan, U.S.
- Elevation: 680 feet (210 m)
- Established: 1928; 98 years ago
- Type: Private
- Tota holes: 18
- Tournaments: Meijer LPGA Classic (2014–present); Western Open (1961)
- Greens: Bentgrass
- Fairways: Bentgrass
- Website: blythefieldcc.org
- Designed by: William Langford, Theoadore J. Moreau
- Par: 72
- Length: 6,859 yards (6,272 m)
- Course rating: 73.4
- Slope rating: 133

Blythefield Country Club is a private country club and golf course in the central United States, located in Belmont, Michigan, a suburb northeast of Grand Rapids. Founded in 1928, the par-72 golf course opened the following June and measures 6,859 yards (6,272 m) from the back tees.

Blythefield has hosted the Meijer LPGA Classic on the LPGA Tour since its debut in 2014, and was the site of the Western Open on the PGA Tour in 1961, won by Arnold Palmer, two strokes ahead of Sam Snead.
