= Shoal Creek, Alabama =

- Census-designated place
- Flag

- Location of Shoal Creek in Shelby County, Alabama.
- Coordinates: 33°25′21″N 86°36′56″W
- Country: United States
- State: Alabama
- County: Shelby

Area
  - Total: 5.31 sq mi (13.74 km^{2})
  - Land: 5.04 sq mi (13.06 km^{2})
  - Water: 0.26 sq mi (0.68 km^{2})
- Elevation: 856 ft (261 m)

Population (2020)
  - Total: 1,668
  - Density: 330.9/sq mi (127.76/km^{2})
- Time zone: UTC-6 (Central (CST))
  - Summer (DST): UTC-5 (CDT)
- Area codes: 205, 659
- GNIS feature ID: 2582699

Shoal Creek is a residential community and Census-designated place in Shelby County, Alabama, United States. As of the 2020 census, Shoal Creek had a population of 1,668.

Shoal Creek Golf and Country Club is located in Shoal Creek.

It is a part of the Birmingham, Alabama metropolitan area, approximately 15 miles (24 km) southeast of downtown Birmingham.

== Demographics ==
Historical population
Census	Pop.	Note	%±
2010	1,400		—
2020	1,668		19.1%
U.S. Decennial Census

Shoal Creek was first listed as a census designated place in the 2010 U.S. census.

=== Racial and ethnic composition ===
Shoal Creek CDP, Alabama – Racial and ethnic composition Note: the US Census treats Hispanic/Latino as an ethnic category. This table excludes Latinos from the racial categories and assigns them to a separate category. Hispanics/Latinos may be of any race.
Race / Ethnicity (NH = Non-Hispanic)	Pop 2010	Pop 2020	% 2010	% 2020
White alone (NH)	1,279	1,489	91.36%	89.27%
Black or African American alone (NH)	67	58	4.79%	3.48%
Native American or Alaska Native alone (NH)	2	1	0.14%	0.06%
Asian alone (NH)	31	34	2.21%	2.04%
Native Hawaiian or Pacific Islander alone (NH)	0	0	0.00%	0.00%
Other race alone (NH)	0	0	0.00%	0.00%
Mixed race or Multiracial (NH)	2	53	0.14%	3.18%
Hispanic or Latino (any race)	19	33	1.36%	1.98%
Total	1,400	1,668	100.00%	100.00%

=== 2020 census ===
As of the 2020 census, Shoal Creek had a population of 1,668. The median age was 48.0 years. 22.6% of residents were under the age of 18 and 22.9% of residents were 65 years of age or older. For every 100 females there were 91.3 males, and for every 100 females age 18 and over there were 91.0 males age 18 and over.

49.3% of residents lived in urban areas, while 50.7% lived in rural areas.

There were 642 households in Shoal Creek, of which 27.7% had children under the age of 18 living in them. Of all households, 71.3% were married-couple households, 8.6% were households with a male householder and no spouse or partner present, and 18.7% were households with a female householder and no spouse or partner present. About 20.4% of all households were made up of individuals and 12.6% had someone living alone who was 65 years of age or older.

There were 700 housing units, of which 8.3% were vacant. The homeowner vacancy rate was 2.3% and the rental vacancy rate was 11.6%.
