= 1984 PGA Championship =

Coordinates: 33.438°N 86.612°W

Tournament information
- Dates: August 16–19, 1984
- Location: Birmingham, Alabama
- Course: Shoal Creek Golf and Country Club
- Organized by: PGA of America
- Tour: PGA Tour

Statistics
- Par: 72
- Length: 7,145 yards (6,533 m)
- Field: 150 players, 70 after cut
- Cut: 148 (+4)
- Prize fund: $700,000
- Winner's share: $125,000

Champion
- (United States) Lee Trevino
- 273 (−15)

Location in the United States
Location in Alabama

The 1984 PGA Championship was the 66th PGA Championship, held August 16–19 at Shoal Creek Golf and Country Club in Birmingham, Alabama. Lee Trevino shot four rounds in the 60s to win his second PGA Championship and sixth and final major title, four strokes ahead of runners-up Gary Player and Lanny Wadkins.

Trevino, age 44, was tied for the lead after two rounds at 137 (−7) with Player and Wadkins. Despite a double bogey at 18 on Saturday, Trevino carded a 67 (−5) for 204 (−12) and a one shot lead. A 69 on Sunday led to a total of 273 (−15), which set a new record for under-par by five strokes for the championship, which was later broken by Steve Elkington in 1995.

Shoal Creek hosted the PGA Championship again in 1990 and the Regions Tradition, a senior major championship, from 2011 through 2015.

== Round summaries ==
=== First round ===
Thursday, August 16, 1984
Friday, August 17, 1984

Place	Player	Score	To par
T1	(United States) Raymond Floyd	68	−4
T1	(United States) Mike Reid	68	−4
T1	(United States) Lanny Wadkins	68	−4
T4	(United States) Dave Barr	69	−3
T4	(United States) Andy Bean	69	−3
T4	(United States) Chip Beck	69	−3
T4	(United States) Scott Bess	69	−3
T4	(England) Nick Faldo	69	−3
T4	(United States) Gary Hallberg	69	−3
T4	(Mexico) Victor Regalado	69	−3
T4	(United States) Scott Simpson	69	−3
T4	(United States) Lee Trevino	69	−3

=== Second round ===
Gary Player shot a 63, which tied the PGA championship record and set the major championship record relative to par at 9-under. The scoring average on this day was 74.38; by strokes gained above the average, Player's round remains the best major championship round in history.

Friday, August 17, 1984

Place	Player	Score	To par
T1	(South Africa) Gary Player	74-63=137	−7
T1	(United States) Lee Trevino	69-68=137	−7
T1	(United States) Lanny Wadkins	68-69=137	−7
T4	(Mexico) Victor Regalado	69-69=138	−6
T4	(United States) Scott Simpson	69-69=138	−6
T6	(Spain) Seve Ballesteros	70-69=139	−5
T6	(United States) Raymond Floyd	68-71=139	−5
T6	(United States) Jay Haas	70-69=139	−5
T6	(United States) Donnie Hammond	70-69=139	−5
T10	(United States) Gary Hallberg	69-71=140	−4
T10	(United States) Larry Mize	71-69=140	−4
T10	(Japan) Tsuneyuki Nakajima	72-68=140	−4
T10	(United States) Mike Reid	68-72=140	−4

=== Third round ===
Saturday, August 18, 1984

Place	Player	Score	To par
1	(United States) Lee Trevino	69-68-67=204	−12
2	(United States) Lanny Wadkins	68-69-68=205	−11
3	(South Africa) Gary Player	74-63-69=206	−10
T4	(United States) Larry Mize	71-69-67=207	−9
T4	(Japan) Tsuneyuki Nakajima	72-68-67=207	−9
T6	(United States) Raymond Floyd	68-71-69=208	−8
T6	(United States) Gary Hallberg	69-71-68=208	−8
8	(Spain) Seve Ballesteros	70-69-70=209	−7
T9	(United States) Hubert Green	70-74-66=210	−6
T9	(United States) Donnie Hammond	70-69-71=210	−6
T9	(United States) Calvin Peete	71-70-69=210	−6
T9	(United States) Scott Simpson	69-69-72=210	−6

=== Final round ===
Sunday, August 19, 1984

Place	Player	Score	To par	Money ($)
1	(United States) Lee Trevino	69-68-67-69=273	−15	125,000
T2	(South Africa) Gary Player	74-63-69-71=277	−11	62,500
T2	(United States) Lanny Wadkins	68-69-68-72=277	−11	62,500
4	(United States) Calvin Peete	71-70-69-68=278	−10	35,000
5	(Spain) Seve Ballesteros	70-69-70-70=279	−9	25,000
T6	(United States) Gary Hallberg	69-71-68-72=280	−8	17,125
T6	(United States) Larry Mize	71-69-67-73=280	−8	17,125
T6	(United States) Scott Simpson	69-69-72-70=280	−8	17,125
T6	(United States) Hal Sutton	74-73-64-69=280	−8	17,125
T10	(United States) Russ Cochran	73-68-73-67=281	−7	12,083
T10	(Japan) Tsuneyuki Nakajima	72-68-67-74=281	−7	12,083
T10	(Mexico) Victor Regalado	69-69-73-70=281	−7	12,083

==== Scorecard ====
Hole	1	2	3	4	5	6	7	8	9	10	11	12	13	14	15	16	17	18
Par	4	4	5	4	3	5	4	3	4	4	5	4	3	4	4	3	5	4
(United States) Trevino	−13	−13	−14	−14	−13	−13	−13	−13	−13	−13	−13	−13	−13	−14	−14	−14	−14	−15
(South Africa) Player	−11	−10	−10	−10	−10	−10	−10	−11	−12	−11	−11	−10	−10	−11	−11	−11	−11	−11
(United States) Wadkins	−11	−12	−12	−12	−12	−13	−13	−13	−14	−14	−13	−12	−12	−12	−13	−13	−12	−11

Cumulative tournament scores, relative to par

Birdie	Bogey
