= Kim Sei-young =

South Korean professional golfer (born 1993)

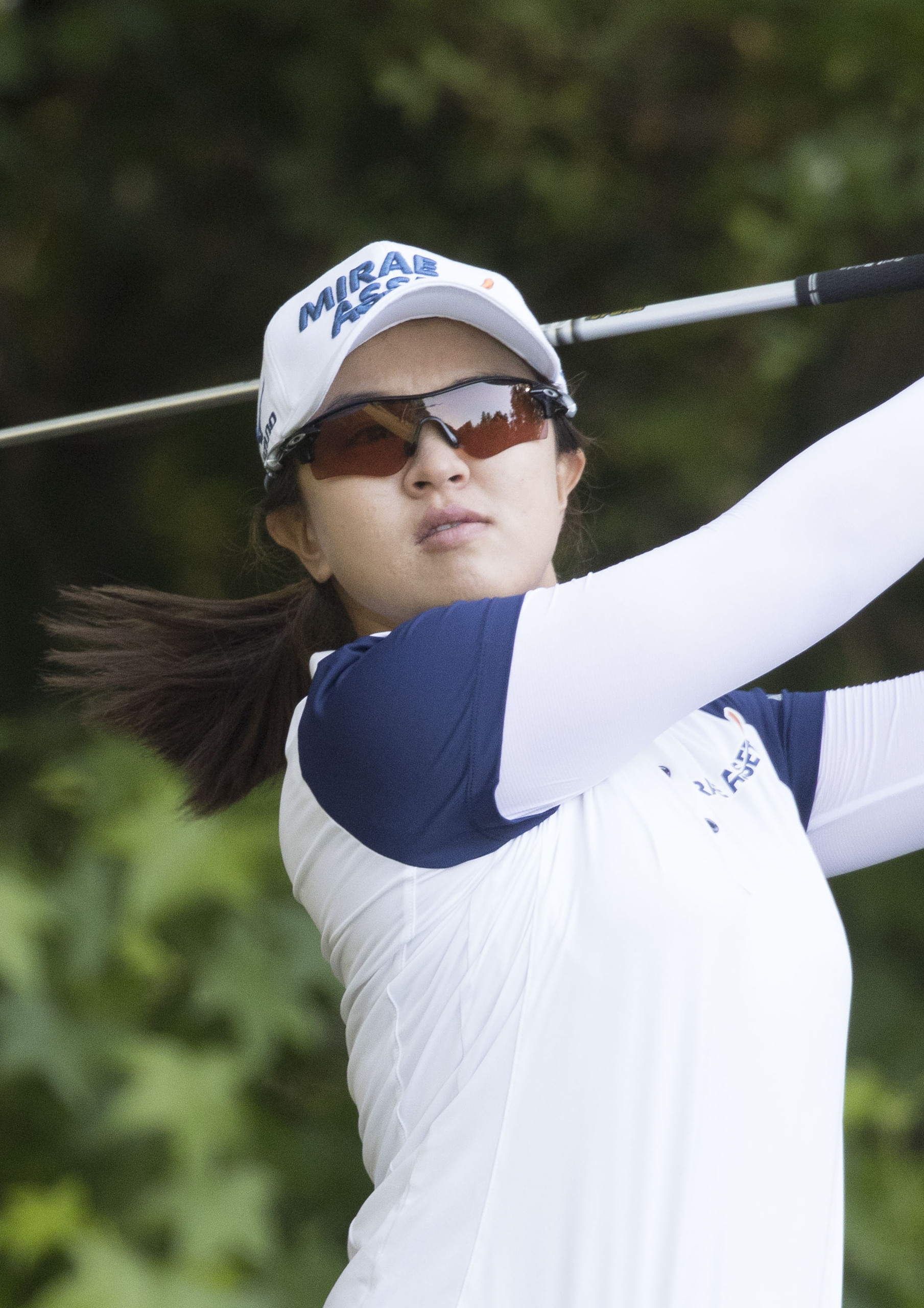
- Kim in 2017

Personal information
- Nationality: South Korea
- Born: 21 January 1993 (age 33) Seoul, South Korea
- Height: 5 ft 4 in (1.63 m)

Career
- Sport: Golf
- College: Korea University
- Turned professional: 2010
- Current tours: LPGA of Korea Tour; LPGA Tour
- Professional wins: 18

Number of wins by tour
- LPGA Tour: 13
- LPGA of Korea Tour: 5

Best results in LPGA major championships (wins: 1)
- Chevron Championship: T3: 2021
- Women's PGA C'ship: Won: 2020
- U.S. Women's Open: 5th: 2026
- Women's British Open: T4: 2018
- Evian Championship: T2: 2018

Achievements and awards
- LPGA Tour Player of the Year: 2020
- LPGA Tour Rookie of the Year: 2015
- Race to the CME Globe: 2019
- GWAA Female Player of the Year: 2020

- Kim Sei-young
- Hangul: 김세영
- Hanja: 金世煐
- RR: Gim Seyeong
- MR: Kim Seyŏng

Kim Sei-young (born 21 January 1993), also known as Sei Young Kim, is a South Korean professional golfer. Kim plays on the LPGA of Korea Tour and the LPGA Tour. She has won five times on the LPGA of Korea Tour and thirteen times on the LPGA Tour, including one major—the 2020 Women's PGA Championship.

== Career ==
In 2015, she won the Pure Silk-Bahamas LPGA Classic (her first victory on the LPGA Tour), the Lotte Championship, in which she made a 154-yard eagle in a playoff to claim the win, and the Blue Bay LPGA, her third victory of the year. In 2016, she won the JTBC Founders Cup, her 10-under-par final round helped her match the lowest overall score in the tournament's history of 27-under-par set by Annika Sorenstam in 2001. Later that year, Kim also won the Meijer LPGA Classic, after defeating Carlota Ciganda in a playoff. Her win at the 2018 Thornberry Creek LPGA Classic set the record for the lowest 72-hole score (257) and the lowest to-par score (−31). She won the 2019 CME Group Tour Championship by making a birdie on the final hole to defeat Charley Hull by one stroke. Her success made her the fourth Korean golfer to win ten events on the LPGA Tour, and she earned record prize money of $1.5m.

Kim won her first major, the 2020 Women's PGA Championship, by five strokes from Inbee Park. She carded an all-time record low score of 266 for the event. She was also named the 2020 LPGA Player of the Year. She won the BMW Ladies Championship in 2025, her first LPGA Tour title for five years.

== Professional wins (18) ==
=== LPGA Tour wins (13) ===
Legend
Major championships (1)
Other LPGA Tour (12)

No.	Date	Tournament	Winning score	To par	Margin of victory	Runner(s)-up
1	8 Feb 2015	Pure Silk-Bahamas LPGA Classic	70-68-72-68=278	−14	Playoff	(Thailand) Ariya Jutanugarn (South Korea) Yoo Sun-young
2	18 Apr 2015	LPGA Lotte Championship	67-67-70-73=277	−11	Playoff	(South Korea) Inbee Park
3	1 Nov 2015	Blue Bay LPGA	70-72-74-70=286	−2	1 stroke	(United States) Kim Kaufman (United States) Candie Kung (United States) Stacy Lewis
4	20 Mar 2016	JTBC Founders Cup	63-66-70-62=261	−27	5 strokes	(New Zealand) Lydia Ko
5	19 Jun 2016	Meijer LPGA Classic	65-69-65-68=267	−17	Playoff	(Spain) Carlota Ciganda
6	7 May 2017	Citibanamex Lorena Ochoa Match Play	1 up			(Thailand) Ariya Jutanugarn
7	8 Jul 2018	Thornberry Creek LPGA Classic	63-65-64-65=257	−31	9 strokes	(Spain) Carlota Ciganda
8	5 May 2019	LPGA Mediheal Championship	72-66-68-75=281	−7	Playoff	(England) Bronte Law (South Korea) Lee Jeong-eun
9	14 Jul 2019	Marathon Classic	67-64-66-65=262	−22	2 strokes	(United States) Lexi Thompson
10	24 Nov 2019	CME Group Tour Championship	65-67-68-70=270	−18	1 stroke	(England) Charley Hull
11	11 Oct 2020	KPMG Women's PGA Championship	71-65-67-63=266	−14	5 strokes	(South Korea) Inbee Park
12	22 Nov 2020	Pelican Women's Championship	67-65-64-70=266	−14	3 strokes	(United States) Ally McDonald
13	19 Oct 2025	BMW Ladies Championship	62-66-69-67=264	–24	4 strokes	(Japan) Nasa Hataoka

LPGA Tour playoff record (4–2)

No.	Year	Tournament	Opponent(s)	Result
1	2015	Pure Silk-Bahamas LPGA Classic	(Thailand) Ariya Jutanugarn (South Korea) Yoo Sun-young	Won with birdie on first extra hole
2	2015	LPGA Lotte Championship	(South Korea) Inbee Park	Won with eagle on first extra hole
3	2016	Meijer LPGA Classic	(Spain) Carlota Ciganda	Won with birdie on first extra hole
4	2019	LPGA Mediheal Championship	(England) Bronte Law (South Korea) Lee Jeong-eun	Won with birdie on first extra hole
5	2021	Pelican Women's Championship	(New Zealand) Lydia Ko (United States) Nelly Korda (United States) Lexi Thompson	Korda won with birdie on first extra hole
6	2026	JM Eagle LA Championship	(Australia) Hannah Green (South Korea) Im Jin-hee	Green won with birdie on first extra hole

=== LPGA of Korea Tour wins (5) ===
No.	Date	Tournament	Winning score	To par	Margin of victory	Runner(s)-up
1	14 Apr 2013	Lotte Mart Women's Open	78-70-71-68=287	−1	2 strokes	(South Korea) Jang Su-yeon (South Korea) Lee Jeong-eun (South Korea) Jang Ha-na
2	8 Sep 2013	Hanwha Finance Classic	71-72-72-68=283	−5	Playoff	(South Korea) Ryu So-yeon
3	15 Sep 2013	MetLife-Hankyung KLPGA Championship	69-69-71-70=279	−9	1 stroke	(South Korea) An Song-yi (South Korea) Chun In-gee
4	18 May 2014	Woori Investment & Securities Ladies Championship	64-73-69=206	-10	Playoff	(South Korea) Heo Yoon-kyung
5	24 Aug 2014	MBN Ladies Open with ONOFF	65-71-67=203	−13	2 strokes	(South Korea) Kang Ye-rin

== Major championships ==
=== Wins (1) ===
Year	Championship	54 holes	Winning score	Margin	Runner-up
2020	Women's PGA Championship	2 shot lead	−14 (71-65-67-63=266)	5 strokes	(South Korea) Inbee Park

=== Results timeline ===
Results not in chronological order.

Tournament	2014	2015	2016	2017	2018	2019	2020	2021	2022	2023	2024	2025	2026
Chevron Championship	T61	T4	CUT	T27	T40	CUT	T18	T3	T17	T52	T30	T24	CUT
U.S. Women's Open	T46	T42	T26	T8	T27	T16	T20	T16	14	T13	WD	CUT	5
Women's PGA Championship		2	11	T4	T25	20	1	T12	T5	CUT	CUT	T52	T8
The Evian Championship		T11	5	T6	T2	T17	NT	T38	T8	CUT	CUT	CUT	T22
Women's British Open		CUT	T50	T16	T4	T24		T13	18	CUT	T37	T13	T29

Win
Top 10
Did not play

CUT = missed the half-way cut
WD = withdrew
NT = no tournament
T = tied

=== Summary ===
Tournament	Wins	2nd	3rd	Top-5	Top-10	Top-25	Events	Cuts made
Chevron Championship	0	0	1	2	2	5	13	10
U.S. Women's Open	0	0	0	1	2	7	13	11
Women's PGA Championship	1	1	0	4	5	9	12	10
The Evian Championship	0	1	0	2	4	7	11	8
Women's British Open	0	0	0	1	1	6	11	9
Totals	1	2	1	10	14	34	60	48

- Most consecutive cuts made – 18 (2019 U.S. Open – 2023 Chevron)
- Longest streak of top-10s – 2 (five times)

== LPGA Tour career summary ==
Year	Tournaments played	Cuts made *	Wins	2nd	3rd	Top 10s	Best finish	Earnings ($)	Money list rank	Scoring average	Scoring rank
2013	1	1	0	0	1	1	T3	100,479	n/a	69.33	n/a
2014	5	3	0	0	0	0	T42	n/a	n/a	73.62	n/a
2015	27	25	3	1	2	11	1	1,820,056	4	70.33	8
2016	25	21	2	2	2	9	1	1,445,937	6	70.25	8
2017	25	22	1	0	2	9	1	1,278,166	10	69.91	11
2018	27	24	1	2	0	9	1	1,369,418	7	70.27	15
2019	25	22	3	1	0	10	1	2,753,099	2	69.89	8
2020	9	9	2	1	0	6	1	1,416,993	2	68.69	1
2021	20	19	0	2	1	4	T2	915,658	17	69.94	12
2022	20	17	0	0	0	5	T5	1,083,246	22	70.19	18
2023	22	16	0	0	1	2	T3	654,240	42	71.03	47
2024	24	19	0	1	3	5	T2	1,103,986	29	70.44	11
2025	21	17	1	0	3	10	1	1,651,769	18	70.05	10
Totals^	245 (2015)	211 (2015)	13	10	14	80	1	15,492,568	11		

^{^} Official as of 2025 season
* Includes matchplay and other tournaments without a cut.

== World rank ==
Position in Women's World Golf Rankings at the end of each calendar year.

Year	World ranking	Source
2015	7	
2016	6	
2017	11	
2018	12	
2019	5	
2020	2	
2021	4	
2022	21	
2023	57	
2024	38	
2025	10	

== Team appearances ==
Professional

- The Queens (representing Korea): 2015
- International Crown (representing South Korea): 2016
