= Pernilla Lindberg =

Swedish professional golfer (born 1986)

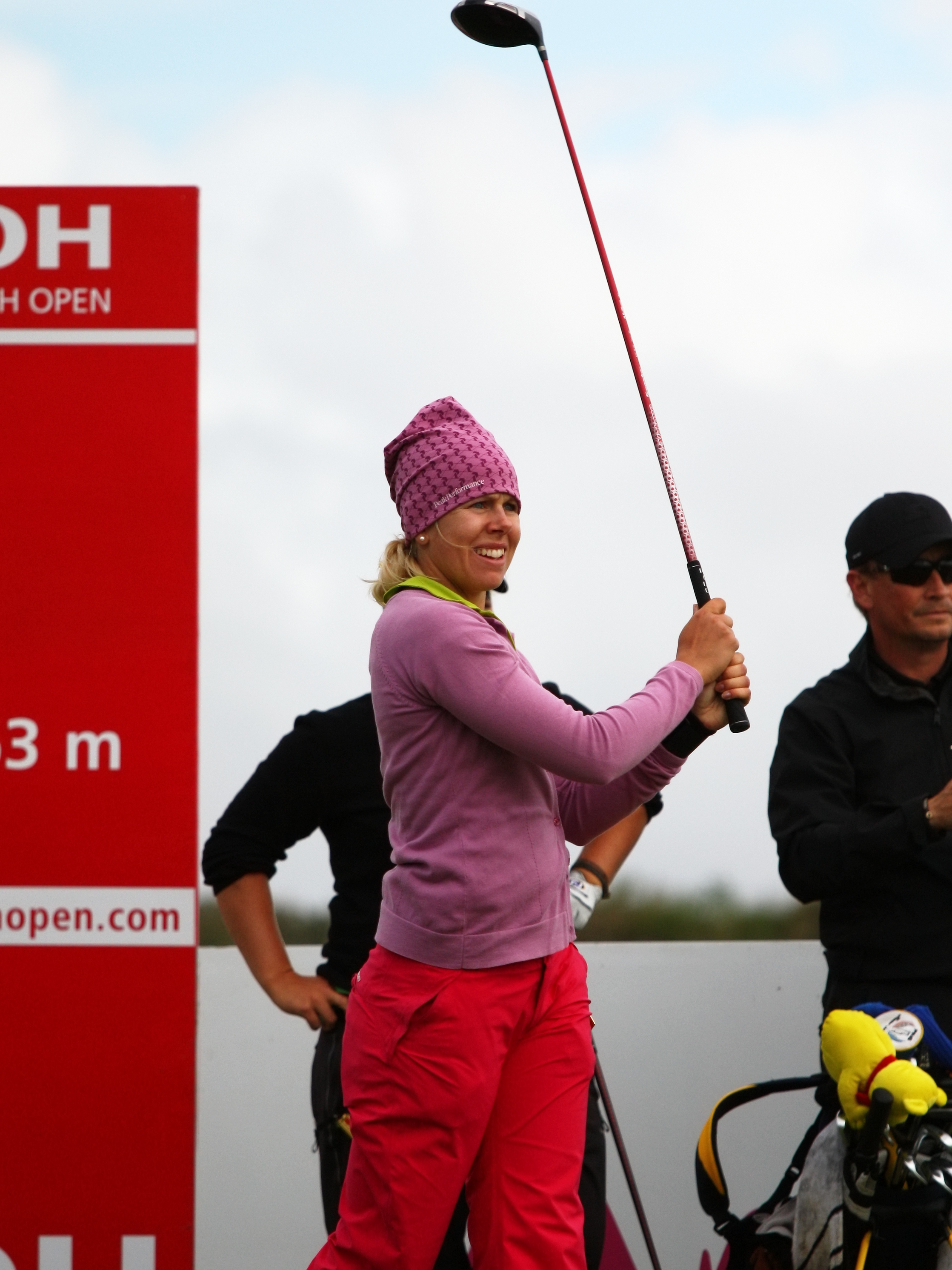
- Lindberg at the 2010 Women's British Open

Personal information
- Nicknames: "P", "Pillan"
- Nationality: Sweden
- Born: 13 July 1986 (age 40) Bollnäs, Sweden
- Height: 5 ft 5 in (1.65 m)
- Spouse: Daniel Taylor
- Children: 1

Career
- Sport: Golf
- College: Oklahoma State University
- Turned professional: 2009
- Former tours: LPGA Tour (2010–2025); Ladies European Tour (2010–2024); Futures Tour (2009)
- Professional wins: 1

Number of wins by tour
- LPGA Tour: 1

Best results in LPGA major championships (wins: 1)
- Chevron Championship: Won: 2018
- Women's PGA C'ship: T18: 2020
- U.S. Women's Open: T5: 2015
- Women's British Open: T11: 2013
- Evian Championship: T26: 2018

Achievements and awards
- Annika Sörenstam Trophy: 2003
- Big 12 Conference Newcomer of the Year: 2006
- Swedish Golfer of the Year: 2018

Pernilla Anna Lindberg (born 13 July 1986) is a Swedish professional golfer who played on the U.S.-based LPGA Tour and the Ladies European Tour. She won the 2018 ANA Inspiration, a major championship, and represented Sweden at the 2016 Summer Olympics. As an amateur she was part of the team winning the 2008 Espirito Santo Trophy, the IGF's World Amateur Team Championship.

== Early life ==
In 1986, Lindberg was born in Bollnäs in the province of Hälsingland, Gävleborg County, Sweden. She grew up in the town. As a youth in Sweden, she was an alpine ski racer. She started playing golf at the age of four introduced by her father Jan, one of the leading players in the local golf club, Bollnäs Golf Club, in the 1970s.

From 2002–2004, Lindberg won seven national youth tournaments in Sweden. In 2003, she topped the Swedish Junior Tour Order of Merit, and was awarded the Annika Sörenstam Trophy.

== Amateur career ==
Lindberg had a successful career. She beat the Americans in the 2003 Junior Solheim Cup at Bokskogen Golf Club 12 1/2–11 1/2 as part of the European team.

With the Swedish national team, she was part of winning the 2004 European Girls' Team Championship, the 2006 European Lady Junior's Team Championship, and the 2008 European Ladies' Team Championship.

In 2005, she represented Sweden at the Spirit International Amateur in Texas and won the individual title.

Lindberg was also part of the team representing Sweden at the 2008 Espirito Santo Trophy in Adelaide, Australia together with Caroline Hedwall and Anna Nordqvist. Sweden won the team tournament for their second title and the first wire-to-wire win seen in the championship in 18 years, beating team Spain by 12 strokes. Lindberg finished 18th individually, despite none of her four rounds counted towards the team score. After Sweden took a 10-stroke-lead after the first round, Lindberg joked that they could sell her non-counting 1-under-par-score to another team for an expensive price.

In 2008 she tied for 10th at the 2008 Scandinavian TPC hosted by Annika on the Ladies European Tour.

Lindberg played college golf in the United States with the Oklahoma State Cowgirls golf team at Oklahoma State University in Stillwater, where she was a three-time All-American. She graduated in May 2009 with a bachelor's degree in international business.

== Professional career ==
In 2009, Lindberg turned pro. She joined the Duramed Futures Tour in June 2009 and was runner-up at the iMPACT Classic in Virginia.

At the end of the year, she qualified for both the LPGA Tour and the Ladies European Tour (LET) for 2010. On the LET, she was runner-up at the 2010 New Zealand Women's Open, after she shot a career low 63 (−9), and at the 2011 Suzhou Taihu Ladies Open in China. Lindberg tied for 5th at the 2015 U.S. Women's Open, her best major championship finish so far.

Her first professional win came at a major championship, the 2018 ANA Inspiration held March 29 – April 2 at Mission Hills Country Club in Rancho Mirage, California. She prevailed in a sudden-death playoff, which extended to eight holes, over Inbee Park and Jennifer Song. Despite holding a three-shot lead after 54 holes, Lindberg shot 71 in the final round. In the final pairing, she birdied the 72nd hole to finish at 273 (−15), tied with Park and Song. In the playoff, Song was eliminated on the third extra hole when Park and Lindberg both birdied. After another try, the remaining two parred the hole and play was suspended due to darkness. On Monday morning, the playoff resumed on the 10th hole, then went to 17 and back to 18. Still tied after seven extra holes, the players returned to #10, where Lindberg sank a thirty-foot (9 m) birdie putt, while Park missed hers from twenty feet (6 m). The victory boosted Lindberg′s world ranking 61 places, from 95 to 34, and a few weeks later she reached a career-best 29.

In October 2025, Lindberg announced she would step back from a full LPGA Tour schedule to start a family, after 340 starts and $3.4 million in prize money. Remaining an LPGA member with past champion status, she said she may return to play the Chevron Championship.

== Personal life ==
On 31 January 2019, Lindberg married Daniel Taylor, who had been her caddie for several seasons. They had a daughter in 2026.

== Awards, honors ==
- In 2003, she led the Swedish Junior Tour Order of Merit earning the Annika Sörenstam Trophy.
- In 2013, Lindberg received Elit Sign number 142 by the Swedish Golf Federation based on world ranking achievements.
- In July 2018, she was named honorary member of Bollnäs Golf Club, where she won the club championship in 2001, when she was 15 years old.
- For the 2018 season, she was named Swedish Golfer of the Year.
- In 2019, Lindberg received The Golden Club ("Guldklubban") the highest award by the Swedish Golf Federation for contributions to Swedish golf.
- In 2020, she was awarded honorary member of the PGA of Sweden.

== Amateur wins ==
- 2005 Spirit International Amateur (individual title)

== Professional wins (1) ==
=== LPGA Tour wins (1) ===
Legend
Major championships (1)
Other LPGA Tour (0)

No.	Date	Tournament	Winning score	To par	Margin of victory	Runners-up	Winner's share ($)
1	2 Apr 2018	ANA Inspiration	65-67-70-71=273	−15	Playoff	(South Korea) Inbee Park (United States) Jennifer Song	420,000

LPGA Tour playoff record (1–0)

No.	Year	Tournament	Opponents	Result
1	2018	ANA Inspiration	(South Korea) Inbee Park (United States) Jennifer Song	Won with birdie on eighth extra hole Song eliminated by birdie on third hole

== Major championships ==
=== Wins (1) ===
Year	Championship	54 holes	Winning score	Margin	Runners-up
2018	ANA Inspiration	3 shot lead	−15 (65-67-70-71=273)	Playoff^{1}	(South Korea) Inbee Park, (United States) Jennifer Song

^{1} Defeated Park and Song in a sudden-death playoff: Lindberg (5-5-4-5-4-3-5-3), Park (5-5-4-5-4-3-5-x) and Song (5-5-5).

=== Results timeline ===
Results not in chronological order.

Tournament	2010	2011	2012	2013	2014	2015	2016	2017	2018	2019
Chevron Championship		CUT		T55	T34	T20	T18	T21	1	CUT
Women's PGA Championship	CUT	CUT	CUT	T28	T53	CUT	CUT	CUT	T49	T60
U.S. Women's Open				CUT	T63	T5	T46	T48	T59	CUT
The Evian Championship^				T64	T41	T46	T64	CUT	T26	CUT
Women's British Open	CUT		CUT	T11	CUT	CUT	CUT	T43	T35	CUT

Tournament	2020	2021	2022	2023	2024	2025
Chevron Championship	T74	T14	T53	CUT	CUT	81
U.S. Women's Open	T58	T49	CUT	CUT		
Women's PGA Championship	T18	CUT	CUT	CUT	CUT	
The Evian Championship^	NT	CUT		69		
Women's British Open	T45	CUT				

^ The Evian Championship was added as a major in 2013

Win
Top 10
Did not play

CUT = missed the half-way cut
NT = no tournament
"T" = tied

=== Summary ===
Tournament	Wins	2nd	3rd	Top-5	Top-10	Top-25	Events	Cuts made
Chevron Championship	1	0	0	1	1	5	14	10
U.S. Women's Open	0	0	0	1	1	1	11	7
Women's PGA Championship	0	0	0	0	0	1	15	5
The Evian Championship	0	0	0	0	0	0	9	6
Women's British Open	0	0	0	0	0	1	11	4
Totals	1	0	0	2	2	8	60	32

- Most consecutive cuts made – 5 (2018 ANA – 2018 Evian)
- Longest streak of top-10s – 1 (twice)

== LPGA Tour career summary ==
Year	Tournaments played	Cuts made	Wins	2nd	3rd	Top 10s	Best finish	Earnings ($)	Money list rank	Scoring average	Scoring rank
2010	14	6	0	0	0	0	T33	41,179	102	73.44	94
2011	11	5	0	0	0	0	T29	53,353	90	73.33	80
2012	18	10	0	0	0	0	T11	131,204	70	72.60	59
2013	25	17	0	0	0	0	T11	206,926	60	72.39	65
2014	30	23	0	0	1	3	T3	411,232	42	71.84	50
2015	29	23	0	0	0	1	T5	417,225	40	71.83	52
2016	30	22	0	0	0	2	7	329,857	59	71.77	61
2017	28	17	0	0	0	2	T4	295,505	62	72.27	109
2018	27	22	1	0	0	2	1	669,628	29	72.19	96
2019	24	12	0	0	0	0	T23	100,054	111	72.56	127
2020	17	15	0	0	0	1	T9	229,189	50	72.18	77
2021	22	12	0	0	0	1	T8	127,907	102	72.13	100
2022	19	11	0	0	0	0	T22	82,378	124	71.95	104
2023	21	14	0	0	0	0	T23	124,862	119	71.83	91
2024	19	6	0	0	0	0	T25	88,651	138	72.75	141
2025	5	3	0	0	0	0	T18	37,525	154	74.17	n/a

As of the 2025 season

== LET career summary ==
Year	Tournaments played	Cuts made	Wins	2nd	3rd	Top 10s	Best finish	Earnings (€)	Order of Merit	Scoring average	Scoring rank
2004	1	0	0	0	0	0	T80	0		77.00	
2005	1	0	0	0	0	0	T136	0		82.50	
2006	1	1	0	0	0	0	T51	0		73.75	
2007	1	1	0	0	0	0	T49	0		75.00	
2008	1	1	0	0	0	1	T10	0		70.00	
2010	8	6	0	1	0	2	T2	48,463	45	72.08	
2011	13	11	0	1	0	6	2	91,054	18	71.47	43
2012	11	9	0	0	1	4	3	99,404	18	71.81	
2013	9	7	0	0	0	3	T7	77,214	18	71.64	14
2014	5	4	0	0	0	0	T32	22,878	61	72.53	
2015	4	3	0	0	0	0	6	30,737		73.14	
2016	3	2	0	0	0	0	T60	9,577		73.10	73
2017	6	4	0	0	0	0	T5	44,579	21	71.40	27
2018	5	4	0	0	0	2	4	66,279		71.24	19
2019	2	0	0	0	0	0	CUT	0			
2020	2	2	0	0	0	0	T45	18,938			
2021	5	3	0	0	0	3	7	49,423	57		
2022	1	1	0	0	0	0	11	9,975			

- through the 2022 season

== Futures Tour summary ==
Year	Tournaments played	Cuts made	Wins	2nd	3rd	Top 10s	Best finish	Earnings ($)	Money list rank	Scoring average	Scoring rank
2009	10	10	0	1	1	5	T2	29,767	11	70.87	1

- joined in June at mid-season

== World ranking ==
Position in Women's World Golf Rankings at the end of each calendar year.

Year	World ranking	Source
2006	669	
2007	654	
2008	503	
2009	379	
2010	202	
2011	134	
2012	123	
2013	118	
2014	93	
2015	87	
2016	104	
2017	109	
2018	42	
2019	156	
2020	158	
2021	172	
2022	284	
2023	234	
2024	368	
2025	736	

== Team appearances ==
Amateur

- European Girls' Team Championship (representing Sweden): 2003, 2004 (winners)
- Junior Solheim Cup (representing Europe): 2003 (winners)
- Vagliano Trophy (representing the Continent of Europe): 2005, 2007 (winners)
- European Ladies' Team Championship (representing Sweden): 2005, 2007, 2008 (winners)
- Spirit International Amateur (representing Sweden): 2005 (individual winner)
- European Lady Junior's Team Championship (representing Sweden): 2006 (winners)
- Espirito Santo Trophy (representing Sweden): 2008 (winners)

Professional

- International Crown (representing Sweden): 2014, 2018
