= Robert Muir Graves =

American architect

- Graves, c. 1990
- Born: September 24, 1930; Trenton, Michigan, U.S.
- Died: June 28, 2003 (aged 72); Bend, Oregon, U.S.
- Education: Michigan State University; UC Berkeley
- Occupation: Golf course architect
- Years active: 1955–2001
- Spouse: Maryalice "Mimi" Rowland (m. 1952–2003)
- Children: Victoria Graves; Elizabeth "Betsy" Mahan; Kathryn "Katy" Yoder

Robert Muir "Bob" Graves (September 24, 1930 – June 28, 2003) was an American landscape and golf course architect who was president of the American Society of Golf Course Architects from 1974 to 1975. Graves designed many golf courses, including golf courses in California, Idaho, Montana, Nevada, Oregon, Utah, Washington, British Columbia and Malaysia.

== Early life and education ==
Graves was born on September 24, 1930, in Trenton, Michigan, United States. He was the son of Orin Nelson Graves (1901–1980) and Margaret J. Muir (1902–1987). He had one sibling, a brother. Graves studied at Michigan State University and graduated from University of California, Berkeley with a degree in landscape architecture. Serving in the United States Navy during the Korean War, and 22 years in the Naval Reserves, he achieved the rank of Commander.

In 1952, while living in Berkeley, California, he married Maryalice "Mimi" Rowland (born 1933). Graves was a multi-faceted man whose interests included flying (both for business and pleasure), music, and a wide range of sports, including golf, skiing and horseback riding.

== Architecture ==
Graves began his career in 1955 as a landscape architect before transitioning into golf course architecture. His first project as a golf course architect was redesign of the Carmel Valley Country Club in Carmel-by-the-Sea, California, and Big Canyon Country Club in Newport Beach, California. He designed over 75 golf courses around the world, but his best-known work is located in the western United States. In 1972, he designed the Big Meadow course at Black Butte Ranch in Oregon.

His Sea Ranch Golf Links was opened in the early 1970s and recognized as a "natural" and "minimalist" golf course architecture piece. Graves also designed Port Ludlow Golf Course and Canterwood Country Club in Washington state. One of his masterpieces, completed in 1978, was the Championship 18 Course at Buffalo Hill Golf Club in Kalispell, Montana. Graves became the President of the American Society of Golf Course Architects in 1974 and served until 1975.

In 2002, Graves and his good friend Geoffrey Cornish published a book called Classic Golf Hole Design: Using the Greatest Holes as Inspiration for Modern Courses.

== List of golf courses in the United States ==
- Avalon Golf Links – North/West Course in Burlington, Washington
- Avalon Golf Links – South/North Course in Burlington, Washington
- Avalon Golf Links – West/South Course in Burlington, Washington
- Baywood Golf & Country Club – Private Golf course in Arcata, California
- Big Canyon Country Club – Private in Newport Beach, California
- Big Meadow at Black Butte Ranch – Resort in Black Butte Ranch, Oregon
- Bigwood Golf Course – Public in Ketchum, Idaho
- Bill Roberts Municipal Golf Course – Public in Helena, Montana
- Blackberry Farm Golf Course – Public in Cupertino, California
- Boundary Oak Golf Course – Public in Walnut Creek, California
- Brooktrails Golf Course – Public in Willits, California
- Buchanan Fields Golf Course – Public in Concord, California
- Buffalo Hill Golf Club (Championship Course) – Public in Kalispell, Montana
- Canterwood Golf Club – Private in Gig Harbor, Washington
- Casper Golf Club – Highlands/Links Course in Casper, Wyoming
- Casper Golf Club – Highlands/Park Course in Casper, Wyoming
- Cedar Hills Golf Club in Cedar Hills, Utah
- Chalk Mountain Golf Course – Public in Atascadero, California
- Cherry Island Golf Course – Public in Elverta, California
- Chuck Corica Golf Complex – The Jack Clark South Course in Alameda, California
- Contra Costa Country Club – Private in Pleasant Hill, California
- Diablo Creek Golf Course – Public in Concord, California
- Diablo Hills Golf Course – Public in Walnut Creek, California
- East at Blue Rock Springs Golf Course – Public in Vallejo, California
- Eighteen Hole at Villages Golf & Country Club – Private in San Jose, California
- El Cariso Golf Course – Public in Sylmar, California
- Executive at Las Positas Golf Course – Public in Livermore, California
- Franklin Canyon Golf Course – Public in Hercules, California
- Glen Annie Golf Club in Goleta, California
- Illahe Hills Country Club in Salem, Oregon
- Jackpot Golf Club – Resort in Jackpot, Nevada
- La Purisima Golf Course – Public in Lompoc, California
- La Rinconada Country Club – Private in Los Gatos, California
- Lake Merced Golf & Country Club – Private in Daly City, California
- Las Positas Golf Course - Public in Livermore, California
- Logan River Golf Course – Public in Logan, Utah
- Maderas Golf Club in Poway, California
- Meadow Springs Country Club – Private in Richland, Washington
- MeadowWood Golf Course – Public in Liberty Lake, Washington
- Monterey Pines Golf Course in Monterey, California
- Moraga Country Club – Private in Moraga, California
- Murray Parkway Golf Course – Public in Murray, Utah
- Northstar at Tahoe Golf Course – Resort in Truckee, California
- Overlake Golf & Country Club – Private in Medina, Washington
- Pajaro Valley Golf Club – Public in Royal Oaks, California
- Palo Alto Hills Golf & Country Club – Private in Palo Alto, California
- Paradise Valley Golf Course – Public in Fairfield, California
- Pittsburg's Delta View Golf Course – Public in Pittsburg, California
- Quail Lodge Resort & Golf Club – Resort in Carmel, California
- Rancho del Pueblo Golf Course in San Jose, California
- Regulation at Las Positas Golf Course – Public in Livermore, California
- Rio Bravo Country Club – Private in Bakersfield, California
- River's Edge Golf Course – Public in Bend, Oregon
- Rossmoor Golf Club – The Dollar Ranch Golf Course in Walnut Creek, California
- Salinas Fairways Golf Course – Public in Salinas, California
- San Geronimo Golf Club – Public in San Geronimo, California
- San Jose Municipal Golf Course – Public in San Jose, California
- San Luis Obispo Golf & Country Club – Private in San Luis Obispo, California
- Santa Clara Golf & Tennis Club – Public in Santa Clara, California
- Saratoga Country Club - Private in Saratoga, California
- Saticoy Country Club – Private in Somis, California
- Sea Ranch Lodge & Golf Links, The – Public in Sea Ranch, California
- Seven Oaks Country Club – Island/Oaks Course in Bakersfield, California
- Seven Oaks Country Club – Lakes/Island Course in Bakersfield, California
- Short Nine at Villages Golf & Country Club – Private in San Jose, California
- St. Stanislaus Golf Course – Public in Ceres, California
- Sun Willows Golf Course – Public in Pasco, Washington
- Swenson Executive at Swenson Park Golf Course – Public in Stockton, California
- The Executive Nine at Palm Desert Country Club – Semi-Private in Palm Desert, California
- The Greens at Redmond – Redmond, Oregon
- Thunder Canyon Country Club – Private in Washoe Valley, Nevada
- Tide/Timber at Port Ludlow Resort – Resort in Port Ludlow, Washington
- Timber/Trail at Port Ludlow Resort – Resort in Port Ludlow, Washington
- Teleli Golf Club – Semi-Private in Sonora, California
- Trail/Tide at Port Ludlow Resort – Resort in Port Ludlow, Washington
- Twin Lakes Golf Course – Public in Saint George, Utah
- Van Buskirk Park Golf Course – Public in Stockton, California
- Westridge Golf Club – Public in La Habra, California
- Widgi Creek Golf Club – Semi-Private in Bend, Oregon
- Woodcreek Golf Club – Public in Roseville, California

== List of international golf courses ==
- Furry Creek Golf and Country Club in Furry Creek, British Columbia, Canada
- Sabah Golf & Country Club in Sabah, Malaysia
- Kinabalu Golf Club in Sabah, Malaysia

== Personal life and death ==
Graves was married to Maryalice "Mimi" Graves (née Rowland) and had three daughters, Victoria Graves, Elizabeth "Betsy" Mahan, and Kathryn "Katy" Yoder. He died on June 28, 2003, in Bend, Oregon, due to complications from cancer.
