= 2018 LPGA Tour =

Golf tour season

2018 LPGA Tour season
- Duration: January 25, 2018 – November 18, 2018
- Number of official events: 33
- Most wins: 3 (Thailand) Ariya Jutanugarn
- Race to CME Globe Winner: (Thailand) Ariya Jutanugarn
- Money leader: (Thailand) Ariya Jutanugarn
- Vare Trophy: (Thailand) Ariya Jutanugarn
- Rolex Player of the Year: (Thailand) Ariya Jutanugarn
- Rookie of the Year: (South Korea) Ko Jin-young

The 2018 LPGA Tour is a series of professional golf tournaments for elite female golfers from around the world. The season begins in Bahamas on January 25 and ends on November 18 at the Tiburón Golf Club in Naples, Florida. The tournaments are sanctioned by the United States–based Ladies Professional Golf Association (LPGA).

== Schedule and results ==
The number in parentheses after each winners' name is the player's total number of wins in official money individual events on the LPGA Tour, including that event. Tournament and winner names in bold indicate LPGA majors.

Date	Tournament	Location	Winner	WWGR points	Purse ($)	Winner's share ($)
Jan 28	Pure Silk-Bahamas LPGA Classic	Bahamas	(United States) Brittany Lincicome (8)	37	1,400,000	210,000
Feb 18	ISPS Handa Women's Australian Open	Australia	(South Korea) Ko Jin-young (2)	34	1,300,000	195,000
Feb 25	Honda LPGA Thailand	Thailand	(United States) Jessica Korda (5)	62	1,600,000	240,000
Mar 4	HSBC Women's World Championship	Singapore	(United States) Michelle Wie (5)	62	1,500,000	225,000
Mar 18	Bank of Hope Founders Cup	Arizona	(South Korea) Inbee Park (19)	46	1,500,000	225,000
Mar 25	Kia Classic	California	(South Korea) Ji Eun-hee (4)	62	1,800,000	270,000
Apr 2^	**ANA Inspiration**	California	(Sweden) **Pernilla Lindberg** (1)	100	2,800,000	420,000
Apr 14	Lotte Championship	Hawaii	(Canada) Brooke Henderson (6)	46	2,000,000	300,000
Apr 22	Hugel-JTBC LA Open	California	(Thailand) Moriya Jutanugarn (1)	62	1,500,000	225,000
Apr 29	LPGA Mediheal Championship	California	(New Zealand) Lydia Ko (15)	56	1,500,000	225,000
May 6	Volunteers of America LPGA Texas Classic	Texas	(South Korea) Park Sung-hyun (3)	31	1,300,000	195,000
May 20	Kingsmill Championship	Virginia	(Thailand) Ariya Jutanugarn (8)	43	1,300,000	195,000
May 27	LPGA Volvik Championship	Michigan	(Australia) Minjee Lee (4)	37	1,300,000	195,000
Jun 3	**U.S. Women's Open**	Alabama	(Thailand) **Ariya Jutanugarn** (9)	100	5,000,000	900,000
Jun 10	ShopRite LPGA Classic	New Jersey	(United States) Annie Park (1)	31	1,750,000	262,500
Jun 17	Meijer LPGA Classic	Michigan	(South Korea) Ryu So-yeon (6)	40	2,000,000	300,000
Jun 24	Walmart NW Arkansas Championship	Arkansas	(Japan) Nasa Hataoka (1)	62	2,000,000	300,000
Jul 1	**KPMG Women's PGA Championship**	Illinois	(South Korea) **Park Sung-hyun** (4)	100	3,650,000	547,500
Jul 8	Thornberry Creek LPGA Classic	Wisconsin	(South Korea) Kim Sei-young (7)	40	2,000,000	300,000
Jul 15	Marathon Classic	Ohio	(Thailand) Thidapa Suwannapura (1)	22	1,600,000	240,000
Jul 29	Aberdeen Standard Investments Ladies Scottish Open	Scotland	(Thailand) Ariya Jutanugarn (10)	46	1,500,000	225,000
Aug 5	**Ricoh Women's British Open**	England	(England) **Georgia Hall** (1)	100	3,250,000	490,000
Aug 19	Indy Women in Tech Championship	Indiana	(South Korea) Park Sung-hyun (5)	53	2,000,000	300,000
Aug 26	CP Women's Open	Saskatchewan	(Canada) Brooke Henderson (7)	56	2,250,000	337,500
Sep 2	Cambia Portland Classic	Oregon	(United States) Marina Alex (1)	40	1,300,000	195,000
Sep 16	**Evian Championship**	France	(United States) **Angela Stanford** (6)	100	3,850,000	577,500
Oct 7	UL International Crown	South Korea	South Korea	n/a	1,600,000	400,000
Oct 14	LPGA KEB Hana Bank Championship	South Korea	(South Korea) Chun In-gee (3)	62	2,000,000	300,000
Oct 21	Buick LPGA Shanghai	China	(United States) Danielle Kang (2)	50	2,100,000	315,000
Oct 28	Swinging Skirts LPGA Taiwan Championship	Taiwan	(United States) Nelly Korda (1)	37	2,200,000	330,000
Nov 4	Toto Japan Classic	Japan	(Japan) Nasa Hataoka (2)	53	1,500,000	225,000
Nov 10	Blue Bay LPGA	China	(Mexico) Gaby López (1)	24	2,100,000	315,000
Nov 18	CME Group Tour Championship	Florida	(United States) Lexi Thompson (10)	53	2,500,000	500,000

^ ANA Inspiration finished on Monday April 2 due to darkness.

== Statistical information ==
=== Wins by player ===
Rank	Player	Wins
T1	Ariya Jutanugarn (THA)	3
T1	Park Sung-hyun (KOR)	3
T3	Nasa Hataoka (JPN)	2
T3	Brooke Henderson (CAN)	2
T5	Brittany Lincicome (USA)	1
T5	Ko Jin-young (KOR)	1
T5	Jessica Korda (USA)	1
T5	Michelle Wie (USA)	1
T5	Inbee Park (KOR)	1
T5	Ji Eun-hee (KOR)	1
T5	Pernilla Lindberg (SWE)	1
T5	Moriya Jutanugarn (THA)	1
T5	Lydia Ko (NZL)	1
T5	Minjee Lee (AUS)	1
T5	Annie Park (USA)	1
T5	Ryu So-yeon (KOR)	1
T5	Kim Sei-young (KOR)	1
T5	Thidapa Suwannapura (THA)	1
T5	Georgia Hall (ENG)	1
T5	Marina Alex (USA)	1
T5	Angela Stanford (USA)	1
T5	Chun In-gee (KOR)	1
T5	Danielle Kang (USA)	1
T5	Nelly Korda (USA)	1
T5	Gaby López (MEX)	1
T5	Lexi Thompson (USA)	1

=== Wins by nation ===
Rank	Nation	Wins
T1	South Korea	9
T1	United States	9
3	Thailand	5
T4	Canada	2
T4	Japan	2
T6	Australia	1
T6	England	1
T6	Mexico	1
T6	New Zealand	1
T6	Sweden	1

== Statistics leaders ==
=== Money list leaders ===
Rank	Player	Events	Prize money ($)
1	(Thailand) Ariya Jutanugarn	28	2,743,949
2	(Australia) Minjee Lee	27	1,551,032
3	(South Korea) Park Sung-hyun	24	1,498,077
4	(Canada) Brooke Henderson	28	1,473,247
5	(Japan) Nasa Hataoka	24	1,454,261
6	(South Korea) Ryu So-yeon	23	1,438,850
7	(South Korea) Kim Sei-young	27	1,369,418
8	(Spain) Carlota Ciganda	25	1,244,610
9	(United States) Lexi Thompson	20	1,223,748
10	(South Korea) Ko Jin-young	25	1,159,005

Source and complete list: LPGA official website.

=== Scoring average ===
Rank	Player	Total strokes	Total rounds	Average
1	(Thailand) Ariya Jutanugarn	7,358	106	69.415
2	(Australia) Minjee Lee	6,905	99	69.747
3	(South Korea) Ko Jin-young	6,492	93	69.806
4	(Canada) Brooke Henderson	6,789	97	69.990
5	(United States) Lexi Thompson	5,041	72	70.014
6	(United States) Jessica Korda	4,623	66	70.045
7	(New Zealand) Lydia Ko	6,655	95	70.053
8	(Spain) Carlota Ciganda	6,378	91	70.088
9	(South Korea) Ryu So-yeon	6,169	88	70.102
10	(Japan) Nasa Hataoka	6,099	87	70.103

Source and complete list: LPGA official website.

== Awards ==
Award	Winner	Country
Rolex Player of the Year	Ariya Jutanugarn	Thailand
Glenna Collett-Vare Trophy	Ariya Jutanugarn	Thailand
Louise Suggs Rolex Rookie of the Year	Ko Jin-young	South Korea
Money winner	Ariya Jutanugarn	Thailand
Rolex Annika Major Award	Ariya Jutanugarn	Thailand
Race to the CME Globe	Ariya Jutanugarn	Thailand

== See also ==
- 2018 Ladies European Tour
- 2018 Symetra Tour
