= 2025 Women's British Open =

Golf tournament

2025 AIG Women's Open
Tournament information
- Dates: 31 July – 3 August 2025
- Location: Porthcawl, Wales, United Kingdom; 51.492°N 3.726°W
- Course: Royal Porthcawl Golf Club
- Organized by: The R&A
- Tours: Ladies European Tour; LPGA Tour

Statistics
- Par: 72
- Length: 6,748 yards (6,170 m)
- Field: 144 players, 71 after cut
- Cut: 146 (+2)
- Prize fund: $9,750,000
- Winner's share: $1,462,500

Champion
- (Japan) Miyū Yamashita
- 277 (−11)
- Location in the United Kingdom Location in Wales

The 2025 AIG Women's Open was played from 31 July to 3 August at the Royal Porthcawl Golf Club in Porthcawl, Wales. It was the 49th Women's British Open, the 25th as a major championship on the LPGA Tour, and the sixth championship held under a sponsorship agreement with AIG. It was the first Women's British Open to be hosted at Royal Porthcawl.

Miyū Yamashita won by two strokes over Charley Hull and Minami Katsu. It was Yamashita's first major victory.

== Venue ==
=== Course layout ===
Hole	Yards	Par	Hole	Yards	Par
1	418	4	10	400	4
2	353	4	11	361	4
3	425	4	12	158	3
4	388	4	13	549	5
5	212	3	14	433	4
6	556	5	15	163	3
7	380	4	16	422	4
8	122	3	17	430	4
9	474	5	18	504	5
Out	3,328	36	In	3,420	36
Source:		Total		6,748	72

== Field ==
The field is made up of 144 players. As with previous tournaments, most players earned exemptions based on past performance on the Ladies European Tour, the LPGA Tour, previous major championships, or with a high ranking in the Women's World Golf Rankings. The rest of the field earned entry by successfully competing in qualifying tournaments open to any female golfer, professional or amateur, with a low handicap.

=== Exemptions ===
Players who are qualified for the event are listed below. Players are listed under the first category in which they qualified.

1. Winners of the Women's British Open, aged 60 or younger at the scheduled end of the championship, provided they are still active members of a recognised tour.

- Ashleigh Buhai
- Georgia Hall
- Ariya Jutanugarn (2,7)
- Lydia Ko (5,7,10)
- Stacy Lewis
- Anna Nordqvist
- Sophia Popov
- Hinako Shibuno
- Jiyai Shin (2,7)
- Yani Tseng
- Lilia Vu (2,5,7,13)
- Kim In-Kyung did not play

2. The top 10 finishers and ties from the 2024 Women's British Open.

- Casandra Alexander (10)
- Pajaree Anannarukarn
- Linn Grant (5,7)
- Im Jin-hee (5,7)
- Akie Iwai (7)
- Nelly Korda (5,7,13,14)
- Nanna Koerstz Madsen
- Alexa Pano
- Mao Saigo (5,7,13)
- Lottie Woad (10)
- Angel Yin (5,7,10)
- Yin Ruoning (5,7,14)

3. The top 15 on the final 2024 LET Order of Merit.

- Manon De Roey (10)
- Perrine Delacour (10)
- Alexandra Försterling
- Esther Henseleit (7)
- María Hernández
- Alice Hewson
- Charley Hull (5,7)
- Bronte Law
- Pauline Roussin
- Kirsten Rudgeley
- Emma Spitz
- Chiara Tamburlini
- Shannon Tan (10)
- Liz Young
- Nicole Broch Estrup did not play

4. The top 5 on the 2025 LET Order of Merit not already exempt (as of 21 July 2025).

- Helen Briem
- Diksha Dagar
- Amelia Garvey
- Nastasia Nadaud
- Lauren Walsh

5. The top 35 on the final 2024 Race to the CME Globe points list.

- An Na-rin
- Céline Boutier (7,16)
- Choi Hye-jin (7)
- Lauren Coughlin (7)
- Ayaka Furue (7,16)
- Hannah Green (7)
- Nataliya Guseva
- Nasa Hataoka
- Brooke Henderson (7,16)
- Megan Khang (7)
- Kim A-lim (7,10)
- Kim Sei-young (7)
- Ko Jin-young (7)
- Jennifer Kupcho (7,10,13)
- Lucy Li
- Gabriela Ruffels
- Ryu Hae-ran (7,10)
- Yuka Saso (15)
- Sarah Schmelzel
- Maja Stark (7,15)
- Patty Tavatanakit (7,13)
- Atthaya Thitikul (7,10)
- Chanettee Wannasaen (7)
- Amy Yang (7,14)
- Rose Zhang (7)
- Ally Ewing did not play

6. The top 25 on the 2025 Race to the CME Globe points list not already exempt (as of 21 July 2025).

- Saki Baba
- Jenny Bae
- Karis Davidson
- Gemma Dryburgh
- Lindy Duncan
- Kristen Gillman
- Hsu Wei-ling
- Moriya Jutanugarn
- Haeji Kang
- Minami Katsu
- Ilhee Lee
- Lee Mi-hyang
- Lee So-mi
- Liu Yan
- Gaby López
- Leona Maguire
- Brooke Matthews
- Cassie Porter
- Jenny Shin
- Elizabeth Szokol
- Albane Valenzuela
- Miranda Wang
- Dewi Weber
- Yuri Yoshida
- Zhang Weiwei

7. The top 50 in the Women's World Golf Rankings (as of 7 July 2025).

- Carlota Ciganda (10)
- Allisen Corpuz (15)
- Chisato Iwai (10)
- Auston Kim
- Grace Kim (16)
- Kim Hyo-joo (10)
- Stephanie Kyriacou
- Andrea Lee
- Minjee Lee (14,15,16)
- Ingrid Lindblad (10)
- Yealimi Noh (10)
- Madelene Sagström (10)
- Rio Takeda (10,11)
- Miyū Yamashita
- Ina Yoon (12)
- Hwang You-min, Lee Ye-won, Lexi Thompson, Yoo Hyun-jo did not play

Addition players added at Championship Committee's discretion.

- Bang Shin-sil
- Shiho Kuwaki
- Ma Da-som

8. The top 3 on the JLPGA Money List not already exempt as of the Suntory Ladies Open.

- Sora Kamiya
- Shuri Sakuma
- Sakura Koiwai did not play

9. The top 2 on the KLPGA Money List not already exempt (as of 7 July 2025).

- Hong Jung-min
- Lee Dong-eun

10. Winners of any recognised LET or LPGA Tour events in the 2025 calendar year.

- Cara Gainer
- Darcey Harry
- Sára Kousková
- Mimi Rhodes

11. Winner of the 2024 JLPGA Money List.

12. Winners of the 2024 KLPGA Money List.

13. Winners of the last five editions of the Chevron Championship.

14. Winners of the last five editions of the Women's PGA Championship.

- Chun In-gee

15. Winners of the last five editions of the U.S. Women's Open.

16. Winners of the last five editions of The Evian Championship.

17. The leading two (not otherwise exempt) in the 2025 Suntory Ladies Open.

- Eri Okayama
- Sayaka Takahashi

18. A minimum of leading three golfers, not otherwise exempt, from the ISPS Handa Women's Scottish Open.

- Mary Liu
- Julia Lopez Ramirez
- Paula Reto

19. Winner of the 2024 and 2025 U.S. Women's Amateur.

- Rianne Malixi (a) did not play

20. The 2024 and 2025 Mark H. McCormack Medal winner.

21. Winner of the 2024 and 2025 Women's Amateur Asia-Pacific

- Jeneath Wong (a)

22. Winner of the 2024 Women's Amateur Latin America.

- Clarisa Temelo (a) did not play

23. Winner of the 2025 Augusta National Women's Amateur.

- Carla Bernat Escuder (a)

24. Winner of the 2025 Women's Amateur Championship.

- Paula Martin Sampedro (a) (25)

25. Winner of the 2025 European Ladies Amateur Championship.

26. Women's Amateur Series winner (If winner is already exempt, then the highest ranked women in the World Amateur Golf Ranking, not already exempt, as of week 30.).

27. Any player who did not compete in the previous year's Women's British Open due to maternity, who subsequently received an extension of membership for the maternity from the player's home tour in the previous year, provided she was otherwise qualified to compete in the previous year's Women's British Open.

=== Final Qualifying ===
Final Qualifying was played over 18 holes on 28 July at Pyle & Kenfig Golf Club with 17 qualifying places available.

- Pei-Yun Chien
- Olivia Cowan
- Brianna Do
- Alessandra Fanali
- Anna Foster
- Laura Fünfstück
- Lydia Hall
- Anna Huang
- Joo Soo-bin
- Momoka Kobori
- Aline Krauter
- Marta Martín
- Morgane Métraux
- Hira Naveed
- Meja Örtengren (a)
- Linnea Ström
- Arpichaya Yubol

== Round summaries ==
=== First round ===
Thursday, 31 July 2025

Eri Okayama and Rio Takeda shot opening rounds of 5-under-par 67 to tie for the lead. Miyū Yamashita was one stroke behind. They were among a group of six Japanese players in the top 13. World number 1 Nelly Korda was in tied-14 place with a 70. Defending champion Lydia Ko shot a 73.

Place	Player	Score	To par
T1	(Japan) Eri Okayama	67	−5
T1	(Japan) Rio Takeda	67	−5
3	(Japan) Miyū Yamashita	68	−4
T4	(South Korea) Chun In-gee	69	−3
T4	(Belgium) Manon De Roey	69	−3
T4	(Germany) Laura Fünfstück	69	−3
T4	(Japan) Chisato Iwai	69	−3
T4	(Japan) Shiho Kuwaki	69	−3
T4	(United States) Alexa Pano	69	−3
T4	(England) Mimi Rhodes	69	−3
T4	(Japan) Mao Saigo	69	−3
T4	(Austria) Emma Spitz	69	−3
T4	(South Korea) Ina Yoon	69	−3

=== Second round ===
Friday, 1 August 2025

Miyū Yamashita shot a round of 65, the low score of the day by three strokes, to take a three shot lead over first round co-leader Rio Takeda. A group of four players was tied for third place, seven strokes off the lead.

Place	Player	Score	To par
1	(Japan) Miyū Yamashita	68-65=133	−11
2	(Japan) Rio Takeda	67-69=136	−8
T3	(Thailand) Pajaree Anannarukarn	71-69=140	−4
T3	(United States) Lindy Duncan	70-70=140	−4
T3	(Germany) Laura Fünfstück	69-71=140	−4
T3	(Switzerland) Chiara Tamburlini	71-69=140	−4
T7	(South Korea) Kim A-lim	70-71=141	−3
T7	(South Korea) Kim Sei-young	71-70=141	−3
T7	(Sweden) Madelene Sagström	72-69=141	−3
T10	(South Africa) Casandra Alexander	73-69=142	−2
T10	(Wales) Darcey Harry	70-72=142	−2
T10	(Japan) Nasa Hataoka	74-68=142	−2
T10	(Germany) Esther Henseleit	71-71=142	−2
T10	(United States) Megan Khang	72-70=142	−2
T10	(United States) Nelly Korda	70-72=142	−2
T10	(United States) Andrea Lee	70-72=142	−2
T10	(China) Liu Yan	72-70=142	−2
T10	(England) Lottie Woad	72-70=142	−2

=== Third round ===
Saturday, 2 August 2025

Place	Player	Score	To par
1	(Japan) Miyū Yamashita	68-65-74=207	−9
2	(South Korea) Kim A-lim	70-71-67=208	−8
3	(United States) Andrea Lee	70-72-67=209	−7
T4	(England) Charley Hull	73-71-66=210	−6
T4	(Japan) Minami Katsu	71-74-65=210	−6
T4	(United States) Megan Khang	72-70-68=210	−6
T4	(Japan) Rio Takeda	67-69-74=210	−6
T8	(England) Georgia Hall	71-73-68=212	−4
T8	(Chinese Taipei) Hsu Wei-ling	71-72-69=212	−4
T8	(Switzerland) Chiara Tamburlini	71-69-72=212	−4

=== Final round ===
Sunday, 3 August 2025

Champion
Smyth Salver winner (low amateur)
(a) = amateur
(c) = past champion

Top 10
Place	Player	Score	To par	Money ($)
1	(Japan) Miyū Yamashita	68-65-74-70=277	–11	1,462,000
T2	(England) Charley Hull	73-71-66-69=279	–9	772,391
T2	(Japan) Minami Katsu	71-74-65-69=279	–9	772,391
T4	(South Korea) Kim A-lim	70-71-67-73=281	–7	452,217
T4	(Japan) Rio Takeda	67-69-74-71=281	–7	452,217
T6	(Chinese Taipei) Hsu Wei-ling	71-72-69-70=282	–6	302,157
T6	(United States) Megan Khang	72-70-68-72=282	–6	302,157
T8	(Australia) Stephanie Kyriacou	74-70-69-71=284	–4	228,359
T8	(Spain) Paula Martín Sampedro (a)	72-74-70-68=284	–4	0
T8	(England) Lottie Woad	72-70-71-71=284	–4	228,359

Leaderboard below the top 10
Place	Player	Score	To par	Money ($)
T11	(United States) Andrea Lee	70-72-67-76=285	–3	188,993
T11	(Japan) Mao Saigo	69-76-68-72=285	–3	188,993
T13	(Thailand) Pajaree Anannarukarn	71-69-75-71=286	–2	145,533
T13	(United States) Lauren Coughlin	75-70-70-71=286	–2	145,533
T13	(South Korea) Kim Hyo-joo	72-73-68-73=286	–2	145,533
T13	(South Korea) Kim Sei-young	71-70-73-72=286	–2	145,533
T13	(Australia) Minjee Lee	70-76-68-72=286	–2	145,533
T13	(Switzerland) Chiara Tamburlini	71-69-72-74=286	–2	145,533
T19	(Sweden) Linn Grant	70-73-72-72=287	–1	112,489
T19	(England) Georgia Hall	71-73-68-75=287	–1	112,489
T19	(China) Liu Yan	72-70-72-73=287	–1	112,489
T19	(England) Mimi Rhodes	69-74-70-74=287	–1	112,489
T23	(France) Céline Boutier	72-74-69-73=288	E	91,298
T23	(Germany) Esther Henseleit	71-71-72-74=288	E	91,298
T23	(South Korea) Im Jin-hee	76-70-70-72=288	E	91,298
T23	(Thailand) Moriya Jutanugarn	72-73-68-75=288	E	91,298
T23	(Switzerland) Morgane Métraux	73-69-71-74=288	E	91,298
T23	(South Korea) Ryu Hae-ran	70-74-71-73=288	E	91,298
T23	(South Korea) Jenny Shin	77-69-67-75=288	E	91,298
T30	(South Korea) An Na-rin	70-73-72-74=289	+1	74,358
T30	(Sweden) Anna Nordqvist	73-70-71-75=289	+1	74,358
T30	(Thailand) Atthaya Thitikul	70-73-72-74=289	+1	74,358
T33	(Japan) Ayaka Furue	70-75-70-75=290	+2	65,500
T33	(Japan) Nasa Hataoka	74-68-73-75=290	+2	65,500
T33	(United States) Alexa Pano	69-77-70-74=290	+2	65,500
T36	(New Zealand) Lydia Ko	73-73-70-75=291	+3	57,632
T36	(United States) Nelly Korda	70-72-74-75=291	+3	57,632
T36	(United States) Sarah Schmelzel	72-71-72-76=291	+3	57,632
39	(South Korea) Chun In-gee	69-76-72-75=292	+4	52,710
T40	(South Africa) Casandra Alexander	73-69-76-75=293	+5	45,330
T40	(Wales) Darcey Harry	70-72-74-77=293	+5	45,330
T40	(Japan) Akie Iwai	73-72-75-73=293	+5	45,330
T40	(Sweden) Madelene Sagström	72-69-76-76=293	+5	45,330
T40	(Singapore) Shannon Tan	73-72-78-70=293	+5	45,330
T40	(United States) Angel Yin	71-72-76-74=293	+5	45,330
T46	(India) Diksha Dagar	71-73-73-77=294	+6	36,719
T46	(United States) Lindy Duncan	70-70-77-77=294	+6	36,719
T46	(South Korea) Ilhee Lee	72-73-72-77=294	+6	36,719
T46	(United States) Brooke Matthews	70-76-72-76=294	+6	36,719
T50	(South Africa) Ashleigh Buhai	73-73-71-78=295	+7	30,667
T50	(England) Bronte Law	72-73-70-80=295	+7	30,667
T50	(South Korea) Lee Mi-hyang	76-70-74-75=295	+7	30,667
T50	(United States) Stacy Lewis	72-74-78-71=295	+7	30,667
T50	(South Korea) Amy Yang	70-76-72-77=295	+7	30,667
T55	(Belgium) Manon De Roey	69-76-76-75=296	+8	26,633
T55	(United States) Kristen Gillman	71-74-72-79=296	+8	26,633
T55	(Austria) Emma Spitz	69-75-75-77=296	+8	26,633
T58	(Spain) Carla Bernat (a)	72-74-73-78=297	+9	0
T58	(Japan) Chisato Iwai	69-76-69-83=297	+9	23,191
T58	(China) Mary Liu	73-73-74-77=297	+9	23,191
T58	(Japan) Yuri Yoshida	73-72-73-79=297	+9	23,191
T58	(Thailand) Arpichaya Yubol	72-74-73-78=297	+9	23,191
T63	(France) Perrine Delacour	73-73-73-80=299	+11	20,485
T63	(Republic of Ireland) Leona Maguire	72-73-75-79=299	+11	20,485
T63	(Thailand) Patty Tavatanakit	71-73-76-79=299	+11	20,485
T63	(Chinese Taipei) Yani Tseng	72-73-78-76=299	+11	20,485
T67	(Germany) Laura Fünfstück	69-71-78-82=300	+12	19,006
T67	(Australia) Grace Kim	71-75-74-80=300	+12	19,006
T69	(South Korea) Ma Da-som	72-73-75-79=303	+15	18,024
T69	(France) Pauline Roussin	76-69-80-78=303	+15	18,024
71	(Malaysia) Jeneath Wong (a)	72-74-77-82=305	+17	0
CUT	(United States) Allisen Corpuz	73-74=147	+3	
CUT	(Scotland) Gemma Dryburgh	76-71=147	+3	
CUT	(Germany) Alexandra Försterling	76-71=147	+3	
CUT	(New Zealand) Amelia Garvey	74-73=147	+3	
CUT	(Wales) Lydia Hall	72-75=147	+3	
CUT	(Canada) Brooke Henderson	71-76=147	+3	
CUT	(Denmark) Nanna Koerstz Madsen	71-76=147	+3	
CUT	(Australia) Gabriela Ruffels	71-76=147	+3	
CUT	(Japan) Hinako Shibuno	75-72=147	+3	
CUT	(South Korea) Jiyai Shin	72-75=147	+3	
CUT	(Switzerland) Albane Valenzuela	73-74=147	+3	
CUT	(Republic of Ireland) Lauren Walsh	72-75=147	+3	
CUT	(South Korea) Bang Shin-sil	73-75=148	+4	
CUT	(Germany) Olivia Cowan	71-77=148	+4	
CUT	(United States) Auston Kim	70-78=148	+4	
CUT	(United States) Lucy Li	71-77=148	+4	
CUT	(Japan) Eri Okayama	67-81=148	+4	
CUT	(Japan) Sayaka Takahashi	77-71=148	+4	
CUT	(Thailand) Chanettee Wannasaen	73-75=148	+4	
CUT	(Netherlands) Dewi Weber	79-69=148	+4	
CUT	(United States) Rose Zhang	72-76=148	+4	
CUT	(Germany) Helen Briem	73-76=149	+5	
CUT	(England) Cara Gainer	74-75=149	+5	
CUT	(South Korea) Joo Soo-bin	74-75=149	+5	
CUT	(Japan) Sora Kamiya	71-78=149	+5	
CUT	(Sweden) Ingrid Lindblad	70-79=149	+5	
CUT	(Mexico) Gaby López	74-75=149	+5	
CUT	(France) Nastasia Nadaud	76-73=149	+5	
CUT	(Australia) Hira Naveed	78-81=149	+5	
CUT	(South Korea) Ina Yoon	69-80=149	+5	
CUT	(United States) Jennifer Kupcho	75-75=150	+6	
CUT	(Japan) Shiho Kuwaki	69-81=150	+6	
CUT	(Japan) Shuri Sakuma	76-74=150	+6	
CUT	(China) Miranda Wang	70-80=150	+6	
CUT	(Japan) Saki Baba	73-78=151	+7	
CUT	(South Korea) Choi Hye-jin	76-75=151	+7	
CUT	(Italy) Alessandra Fanali	73-78=151	+7	
CUT	(Russia) Nataliya Guseva	75-76=151	+7	
CUT	(South Korea) Hong Jung-min	72-79=151	+7	
CUT	(South Korea) Ko Jin-young	78-73=151	+7	
CUT	(South Korea) Lee Dong-eun	71-80=151	+7	
CUT	(New Zealand) Momoka Kobori	74-77=151	+7	
CUT	(South Korea) Lee So-mi	72-79=151	+7	
CUT	(Sweden) Meja Örtengren (a)	74-77=151	+7	
CUT	(United States) Elizabeth Szokol	71-80=151	+7	
CUT	(United States) Lilia Vu	74-77=151	+7	
CUT	(China) Yin Ruoning	74-77=151	+7	
CUT	(Chinese Taipei) Pei-Yun Chien	77-75=152	+8	
CUT	(England) Alice Hewson	77-75=152	+8	
CUT	(Canada) Anna Huang	76-76=152	+8	
CUT	(Thailand) Moriya Jutanugarn	77-75=152	+8	
CUT	(Czech Republic) Sára Kousková	71-81=152	+8	
CUT	(Australia) Cassie Porter	79-73=152	+8	
CUT	(Sweden) Maja Stark	74-78=152	+8	
CUT	(Australia) Karis Davidson	76-77=153	+9	
CUT	(Germany) Aline Krauter	77-76=153	+9	
CUT	(China) Zhang Weiwei	74-79=153	+9	
CUT	(Spain) María Hernández	78-76=154	+10	
CUT	(South Korea) Haeji Kang	75-79=154	+10	
CUT	(England) Liz Young	77-77=154	+10	
CUT	(United States) Brianna Do	77-78=155	+11	
CUT	(Republic of Ireland) Anna Foster	76-79=155	+11	
CUT	(United States) Yealimi Noh	78-77=155	+11	
CUT	(South Africa) Paula Reto	76-79=155	+11	
CUT	(United States) Jenny Bae	76-80=156	+12	
CUT	(Spain) Carlota Ciganda	77-79=156	+12	
CUT	(Australia) Hannah Green	79-77=156	+12	
CUT	(Spain) Julia López Ramírez	80-76=156	+12	
CUT	(Sweden) Linnea Ström	76-80=156	+12	
CUT	(Spain) Marta Martín	80-77=157	+13	
CUT	(Australia) Kirsten Rudgeley	78-79=157	+13	
CUT	(Japan) Yuka Saso	75-82=157	+13	
CUT	(Germany) Sophia Popov (c)	82-82=164	+20	
