= 2025 Evian Championship =

Golf tournament

Tournament information
- Dates: 10–13 July 2025
- Location: Évian-les-Bains, France; 46.394°N 6.570°E
- Course: Evian Resort Golf Club
- Tours: Ladies European Tour; LPGA Tour

Statistics
- Par: 71
- Length: 6,504 yards (5,947 m)
- Field: 132 players 74 after cut
- Cut: 144 (+2)
- Prize fund: $8,000,000
- Winner's share: $1,200,000

Champion
- (Australia) Grace Kim
- 270 (−14)

Location map
- Location in France Location in Auvergne-Rhône-Alpes

The 2025 Evian Championship was played 10–13 July in France. It was the 31st Evian Championship (the first 20 played as the Evian Masters), and the 12th as a major championship on the LPGA Tour.

Grace Kim won in a playoff with Atthaya Thitikul. It was Kim's first victory in a major. World number one amateur, Lottie Woad, finished tied for third, one stroke out of the playoff. She turned professional the following week.

== Field ==
The field for the tournament was set at 132, and most earned exemptions based on past performance on the Ladies European Tour, the LPGA Tour, or with a high ranking in the Women's World Golf Rankings.

1. Evian invitations (six)

- Gianna Clemente (a)
- María José Marín (a)
- Morgane Métraux
- Nastasia Nadaud
- Mirabel Ting (a)
- Lottie Woad (a)

2. Top 50 from Women's World Golf Rankings

- Céline Boutier (4)
- Choi Hye-jin (8)
- Carlota Ciganda (6)
- Allisen Corpuz (5)
- Lauren Coughlin (6,8)
- Ayaka Furue (4,8)
- Linn Grant
- Hannah Green (6)
- Nasa Hataoka
- Brooke Henderson (4)
- Esther Henseleit (8)
- Charley Hull
- Hwang You-min
- Im Jin-hee
- Akie Iwai (8)
- Chisato Iwai (6)
- Ariya Jutanugarn
- Megan Khang
- Kim A-lim (6)
- Auston Kim
- Kim Hyo-joo (4,6)
- Kim Sei-young
- Ko Jin-young (4)
- Lydia Ko (4,5,6)
- Nelly Korda (5,6)
- Jennifer Kupcho (5,6)
- Stephanie Kyriacou (8)
- Andrea Lee
- Minjee Lee (4,5)
- Ingrid Lindblad (6)
- Yealimi Noh (6)
- Ryu Hae-ran (6,8)
- Madelene Sagström (6)
- Mao Saigo (5)
- Yuka Saso (5)
- Maja Stark (5)
- Rio Takeda (6)
- Patty Tavatanakit (5,8)
- Atthaya Thitikul (6)
- Lilia Vu (5)
- Chanettee Wannasaen (6)
- Miyū Yamashita
- Amy Yang (5)
- Angel Yin (6)
- Yin Ruoning (5,6)
- Ina Yoon
- Rose Zhang
- Lee Ye-won and Lexi Thompson did not play

3. Top player not already qualified from the Jabra Ladies Open

- Maha Haddioui

4. Past Evian Championship winners

- Chun In-gee (5)
- Anna Nordqvist (5)
- Angela Stanford did not play

5. Majors winners (last five years)

- Ashleigh Buhai
- Sophia Popov

6. LPGA tournament winners (since last Evian)

- Moriya Jutanugarn
- Thidapa Suwannapura

7. LET Order of Merit (top seven from 2024, top seven from current year)

- Casandra Alexander
- Helen Briem
- Manon De Roey
- Perrine Delacour
- Cara Gainer
- Darcey Harry
- Alice Hewson
- Sára Kousková
- Bronte Law
- Mimi Rhodes
- Pauline Roussin
- Chiara Tamburlini
- Shannon Tan

8. Top 10 and ties previous year's Evian Championship

- Pajaree Anannarukarn
- Pei-Yun Chien
- Ally Ewing did not play

9. Amateur winners

- Carla Bernat Escuder (Augusta National Women's Amateur)
- Rianne Malixi (U.S. Women's Amateur)
- Clarisa Temelo (Women's Amateur Latin America)
- Jeneath Wong (Women's Amateur Asia-Pacific)
- Paula Martín Sampedro (The Women's Amateur Championship) did not play

10. LPGA Tour CME Globe points list (if needed to fill the field to 132)

- An Na-rin
- Aditi Ashok
- Saki Baba
- Jenny Bae
- Robyn Choi
- Karis Davidson
- Brianna Do
- Gemma Dryburgh
- Lindy Duncan
- Kristen Gillman
- Nataliya Guseva
- Muni He
- Hsu Wei-ling
- Jeon Ji-won
- Joo Soo-bin
- Haeji Kang
- Minami Katsu
- Grace Kim
- Aline Krauter
- Ilhee Lee
- Lee Jeong-eun
- Lee Mi-hyang
- Lee So-mi
- Lucy Li
- Mary Liu
- Ruixin Liu
- Liu Yan
- Gaby López
- Julia López Ramirez
- Nanna Koerstz Madsen
- Leona Maguire
- Brooke Matthews
- Benedetta Moresco
- Azahara Muñoz
- Hira Naveed
- Ryann O'Toole
- Alexa Pano
- Park Kum-kang
- Emily Kristine Pedersen
- Cassie Porter
- Paula Reto
- Gabriela Ruffels
- Sarah Schmelzel
- Hinako Shibuno
- Jenny Shin
- Gigi Stoll
- Albane Valenzuela
- Miranda Wang
- Dewi Weber
- Jing Yan
- Yuri Yoshida
- Arpichaya Yubol
- Zhang Weiwei

== Round summaries ==
=== First round ===
Thursday, 10 July 2025

Five players shot 5-under par rounds of 65 to tied for the lead. This included Leona Maguire who scored a hole-in-one on the second hole. World number 1 Nelly Korda and defending champion Ayaka Furue were two strokes behind the leaders. Amateur Lottie Woad, who won the previous week's KPMG Women's Irish Open, was a further stroke back with a 68.

Place	Player	Score	To par
T1	(Australia) Grace Kim	65	−6
T1	(United States) Jennifer Kupcho	65	−6
T1	(United States) Andrea Lee	65	−6
T1	(Republic of Ireland) Leona Maguire	65	−6
T1	(Australia) Gabriela Ruffels	65	−6
6	(Australia) Minjee Lee	66	−5
T7	(South Africa) Casandra Alexander	67	−4
T7	(India) Aditi Ashok	67	−4
T7	(Germany) Helen Briem	67	−4
T7	(South Korea) Choi Hye-jin	67	−4
T7	(Japan) Ayaka Furue	67	−4
T7	(United States) Nelly Korda	67	−4
T7	(South Korea) Lee So-mi	67	−4
T7	(China) Mary Liu	67	−4
T7	(Japan) Mao Saigo	67	−4

=== Second round ===
Friday, 11 July 2025

Lee So-mi shot a 65 for a total of 132 (−10) and had a one-stroke lead over Grace Kim. After being tied for 7th place, World number 1 Nelly Korda dropped to a tie for 12th place and defending champion Ayaka Furue dropped to T26. The cut came at 144 (+2), with 74 players advancing to the final two rounds. Two amateurs made the cut, Lottie Woad (−5) and María José Marín (+2). Three of the top-5 world ranking players missed the cut: Lydia Ko, Yin Ruoning, and Ryu Hae-ran.

Place	Player	Score	To par
1	(South Korea) Lee So-mi	67-65=132	−10
2	(Australia) Grace Kim	65-68=133	−9
3	(United States) Jennifer Kupcho	65-69=134	−8
T4	(South Africa) Casandra Alexander	67-68=135	−7
T4	(South Korea) Choi Hye-jin	67-68=135	−7
T4	(United States) Andrea Lee	65-70=135	−7
T7	(India) Aditi Ashok	67-69=136	−6
T7	(Republic of Ireland) Leona Maguire	65-71=136	−6
T7	(Australia) Gabriela Ruffels	65-71=136	−6
T7	(Japan) Rio Takeda	69-67=136	−6
T7	(Thailand) Atthaya Thitikul	68-68=136	−6

=== Third round ===
Saturday, 12 July 2025

Cara Gainer and Gabriela Ruffels shared the lead at −11.

Place	Player	Score	To par
T1	(England) Cara Gainer	68-70-64=202	−11
T1	(Australia) Gabriela Ruffels	65-71-66=202	−11
T3	(Australia) Grace Kim	65-68-70=203	−10
T3	(Australia) Minjee Lee	66-71-66=203	−10
T3	(South Korea) Lee So-mi	67-65-71=203	−10
T3	(Thailand) Atthaya Thitikul	68-68-67=203	−10
T7	(South Africa) Casandra Alexander	67-68-69=204	−9
T7	(Japan) Yuri Yoshida	72-69-63=204	−9
T9	(South Korea) Choi Hye-jin	67-68-70=205	−8
T9	(France) Nastasia Nadaud	71-67-67=205	−8
T9	(South Korea) Jenny Shin	69-68-68=205	−8

=== Final round ===
Sunday, 13 July 2025

Champion
(a) = amateur
(c) = past champion

Top 10
Place	Player	Score	To par	Money (US$)
1	(Australia) Grace Kim	65-68-70-67=270	−14	1,200,000
2	(Thailand) Jeeno Thitikul	68-68-67-67=270	−14	722,002
T3	(Australia) Minjee Lee (c)	66-71-66-68=271	−13	523,761
T3	(England) Lottie Woad (a)	68-69-70-64=271	−13	0
T5	(United States) Andrea Lee	65-70-71-66=272	−12	365,644
T5	(United States) Angel Yin	72-67-70-63=272	−12	365,644
T7	(Thailand) Ariya Jutanugarn	69-70-68-66=273	−11	245,081
T7	(Republic of Ireland) Leona Maguire	65-71-70-67=273	−11	245,081
T9	(Mexico) Gaby López	68-74-67-65=274	−10	185,790
T9	(Australia) Gabriela Ruffels	65-71-66-72=274	−10	185,790

Leaderboard below the top 10
Place	Player	Score	To par	Money (US$)
T11	(United States) Jennifer Kupcho	65-69-72-69=275	−9	148,891
T11	(Denmark) Emily Kristine Pedersen	70-67-69-69=275	−9	148,891
T11	(Japan) Rio Takeda	69-67-70-69=275	−9	148,891
T14	(South Korea) Choi Hye-jin	67-68-70-71=276	−8	112,525
T14	(England) Cara Gainer	68-70-64-74=276	−8	112,525
T14	(Japan) Chisato Iwai	69-74-67-66=276	−8	112,525
T14	(Australia) Stephanie Kyriacou	70-68-74-64=276	−8	112,525
T14	(South Korea) Lee So-mi	67-65-71-73=276	−8	112,525
T14	(Japan) Miyū Yamashita	69-71-68-68=276	−8	112,525
20	(South Africa) Casandra Alexander	67-68-69-73=277	−7	94,081
T21	(South Korea) An Na-rin	74-70-66-68=278	−6	81,600
T21	(France) Céline Boutier (c)	68-70-70-70=278	−6	81,600
T21	(France) Perrine Delacour	70-71-70-67=278	−6	81,600
T21	(United States) Megan Khang	68-75-68-67=278	−6	81,600
T21	(China) Ruixin Liu	72-71-63-72=278	−6	81,600
T21	(France) Nastasia Nadaud	71-67-67-73=278	−6	81,600
T21	(Japan) Yuri Yoshida	72-69-63-74=278	−6	81,600
T28	(India) Aditi Ashok	67-69-70-73=279	−5	67,198
T28	(South Korea) Lee Mi-hyang	71-68-70-70=279	−5	67,198
T28	(Spain) Julia López Ramírez	72-67-70-70=279	−5	67,198
T31	(Canada) Brooke Henderson (c)	73-71-68-68=280	−4	58,502
T31	(South Korea) Kim Hyo-joo (c)	71-70-70-69=280	−4	58,502
T31	(South Korea) Jenny Shin	69-68-68-75=280	−4	58,502
T31	(Thailand) Jasmine Suwannapura	72-68-73-67=280	−4	58,502
T35	(South Korea) Ko Jin-young (c)	70-69-71-71=281	−3	50,597
T35	(China) Mary Liu	67-71-70-73=281	−3	50,597
T35	(United States) Rose Zhang	71-70-71-69=281	−3	50,597
T38	(Belgium) Manon De Roey	74-70-71-67=282	−2	42,929
T38	(South Korea) Im Jin-hee	70-72-70-70=282	−2	42,929
T38	(South Korea) Lee Jeong-eun	74-69-70-69=282	−2	42,929
T38	(South Africa) Paula Reto	69-71-71-71=282	−2	42,929
T38	(Japan) Mao Saigo	67-72-69-74=282	−2	42,929
T43	(Chinese Taipei) Pei-Yun Chien	71-71-67-74=283	−1	34,390
T43	(United States) Auston Kim	69-68-74-72=283	−1	34,390
T43	(United States) Nelly Korda	67-70-75-71=283	−1	34,390
T43	(Germany) Aline Krauter	73-69-72-69=283	−1	34,390
T43	(Thailand) Patty Tavatanakit	71-68-74-70=283	−1	34,390
T43	(Thailand) Chanettee Wannasaen	69-75-70-69=283	−1	34,390
T49	(Thailand) Pajaree Anannarukarn	73-70-68-73=284	E	27,049
T49	(United States) Allisen Corpuz	76-67-68-73=284	E	27,049
T49	(Scotland) Gemma Dryburgh	74-70-73-67=284	E	27,049
T49	(Germany) Esther Henseleit	72-72-70-70=284	E	27,049
T49	(South Korea) Hwang You-min	75-68-72-69=284	E	27,049
T49	(Sweden) Madelene Sagström	72-72-70-70=284	E	27,049
T49	(United States) Sarah Schmelzel	70-71-69-74=284	E	27,049
T56	(Germany) Helen Briem	67-75-67-76=285	+1	22,926
T56	(Denmark) Nanna Koerstz Madsen	74-68-68-75=285	+1	22,926
T56	(South Korea) Amy Yang	72-71-71-71=285	+1	22,926
T59	(United States) Jenny Bae	71-73-70-72=286	+2	19,765
T59	(United States) Brianna Do	76-68-68-74=286	+2	19,765
T59	(Japan) Ayaka Furue (c)	67-72-74-73=286	+2	19,765
T59	(Japan) Nasa Hataoka	70-68-76-72=286	+2	19,765
T59	(Spain) Azahara Muñoz	72-71-74-69=286	+2	19,765
T59	(Singapore) Shannon Tan	73-68-70-75=286	+2	19,765
T65	(United States) Lucy Li	70-73-71-73=287	+3	17,788
T65	(Australia) Hira Naveed	71-71-73-72=287	+3	17,788
T65	(South Korea) Ina Yoon	68-70-76-73=287	+3	17,788
T68	(Japan) Minami Katsu	72-70-72-75=289	+5	16,800
T68	(United States) Gigi Stoll	72-70-71-76=289	+5	16,800
T70	(South Korea) Haeji Kang	72-71-72-75=290	+6	16,010
T70	(Colombia) María José Marín (a)	75-69-73-73=290	+6	0
T70	(China) Zhang Weiwei	71-69-73-77=290	+6	16,010
73	(England) Bronte Law	71-73-73-75=292	+8	15,617
WD	(United States) Lindy Duncan	69-69-77=215	+2	15,413
CUT	(Australia) Robyn Choi	71-74=145	+3	0
CUT	(South Korea) Chun In-gee (c)	70-75=145	+3	0
CUT	(Sweden) Linn Grant	72-73=145	+3	0
CUT	(Japan) Akie Iwai	73-72=145	+3	0
CUT	(United States) Yealimi Noh	75-70=145	+3	0
CUT	(France) Pauline Roussin	71-74=145	+3	0
CUT	(Mexico) Clarisa Temelo (a)	70-75=145	+3	0
CUT	(Switzerland) Albane Valenzuela	73-72=145	+3	0
CUT	(China) Yin Ruoning	72-73=145	+3	0
CUT	(Spain) Carlota Ciganda	74-72=146	+4	0
CUT	(United States) Lauren Coughlin	73-73=146	+4	0
CUT	(Australia) Karis Davidson	74-72=146	+4	0
CUT	(Philippines) Rianne Malixi (a)	74-72=146	+4	0
CUT	(Japan) Yuka Saso	74-72=146	+4	0
CUT	(Sweden) Maja Stark	72-74=146	+4	0
CUT	(Netherlands) Dewi Weber	71-75=146	+4	0
CUT	(Malaysia) Jeneath Wong (a)	74-72=146	+4	0
CUT	(Thailand) Arpichaya Yubol	74-72=146	+4	0
CUT	(Morocco) Maha Haddioui	73-74=147	+5	0
CUT	(China) Muni He	69-78=147	+5	0
CUT	(England) Alice Hewson	76-71=147	+5	0
CUT	(South Korea) Jeon Ji-won	76-71=147	+5	0
CUT	(South Korea) Kim A-lim	71-76=147	+5	0
CUT	(New Zealand) Lydia Ko (c)	73-74=147	+5	0
CUT	(South Korea) Ilhee Lee	76-71=147	+5	0
CUT	(China) Liu Yan	72-75=147	+5	0
CUT	(Italy) Benedetta Moresco	75-72=147	+5	0
CUT	(United States) Ryann O'Toole	77-70=147	+5	0
CUT	(South Korea) Park Kum-kang	73-74=147	+5	0
CUT	(Germany) Sophia Popov	75-72=147	+5	0
CUT	(England) Mimi Rhodes	75-72=147	+5	0
CUT	(China) Miranda Wang	76-71=147	+5	0
CUT	(United States) Gianna Clemente (a)	77-71=148	+6	0
CUT	(United States) Kristen Gillman	74-74=148	+6	0
CUT	(South Korea) Kim Sei-young	72-76=148	+6	0
CUT	(United States) Brooke Matthews	72-76=148	+6	0
CUT	(Sweden) Anna Nordqvist (c)	73-75=148	+6	0
CUT	(United States) Lilia Vu	73-75=148	+6	0
CUT	(China) Jing Yan	75-73=148	+6	0
CUT	(South Africa) Ashleigh Buhai	78-71=149	+7	0
CUT	(Sweden) Ingrid Lindblad	77-72=149	+7	0
CUT	(South Korea) Ryu Hae-ran	79-70=149	+7	0
CUT	(Japan) Saki Baba	73-77=150	+8	0
CUT	(Spain) Carla Bernat (a)	74-76=150	+8	0
CUT	(Australia) Hannah Green	73-77=150	+8	0
CUT	(Russia) Nataliya Guseva	72-78=150	+8	0
CUT	(Wales) Darcey Harry	76-75=151	+9	0
CUT	(Switzerland) Morgane Métraux	76-75=151	+9	0
CUT	(United States) Alexa Pano	82-69=151	+9	0
CUT	(Japan) Hinako Shibuno	76-75=151	+9	0
CUT	(Switzerland) Chiara Tamburlini	73-78=151	+9	0
CUT	(Malaysia) Mirabel Ting	78-73=151	+9	0
CUT	(Chinese Taipei) Hsu Wei-ling	76-76=152	+10	0
CUT	(Thailand) Moriya Jutanugarn	75-77=152	+10	0
CUT	(Australia) Cassie Porter	73-79=152	+10	0
CUT	(South Korea) Joo Soo-bin	81-73=154	+12	0
CUT	(Czech Republic) Sára Kousková	81-73=154	+12	0
WD	(England) Charley Hull	–	–	0
