= 2024 Women's British Open =

Golf tournament

2024 AIG Women's Open

Tournament information
- Dates: 22–25 August 2024
- Location: St Andrews, Scotland; 56.343°N 2.803°W
- Course: Old Course
- Organized by: The R&A
- Tours: Ladies European Tour; LPGA Tour

Statistics
- Par: 72
- Length: 6,784 yards (6,203 m)
- Field: 144 players, 82 after cut
- Cut: 148 (+4)
- Prize fund: $9,500,000
- Winner's share: $1,350,000

Champion
- (New Zealand) Lydia Ko
- 281 (−7)
- Location in the United Kingdom Location in Scotland

The 2024 AIG Women's Open was played from 22 to 25 August at the Old Course at St Andrews in St Andrews, Scotland. It was the 48th Women's British Open, the 24th as a major championship on the LPGA Tour, and the fifth championship held under a sponsorship agreement with AIG. It was the third Women's British Open to be hosted at St Andrews.

Lydia Ko won by two strokes over Nelly Korda, Jiyai Shin, Lilia Vu, and Yin Ruoning. It was her third major championship and came two weeks after winning the gold medal at the 2024 Summer Olympics.

== Course ==
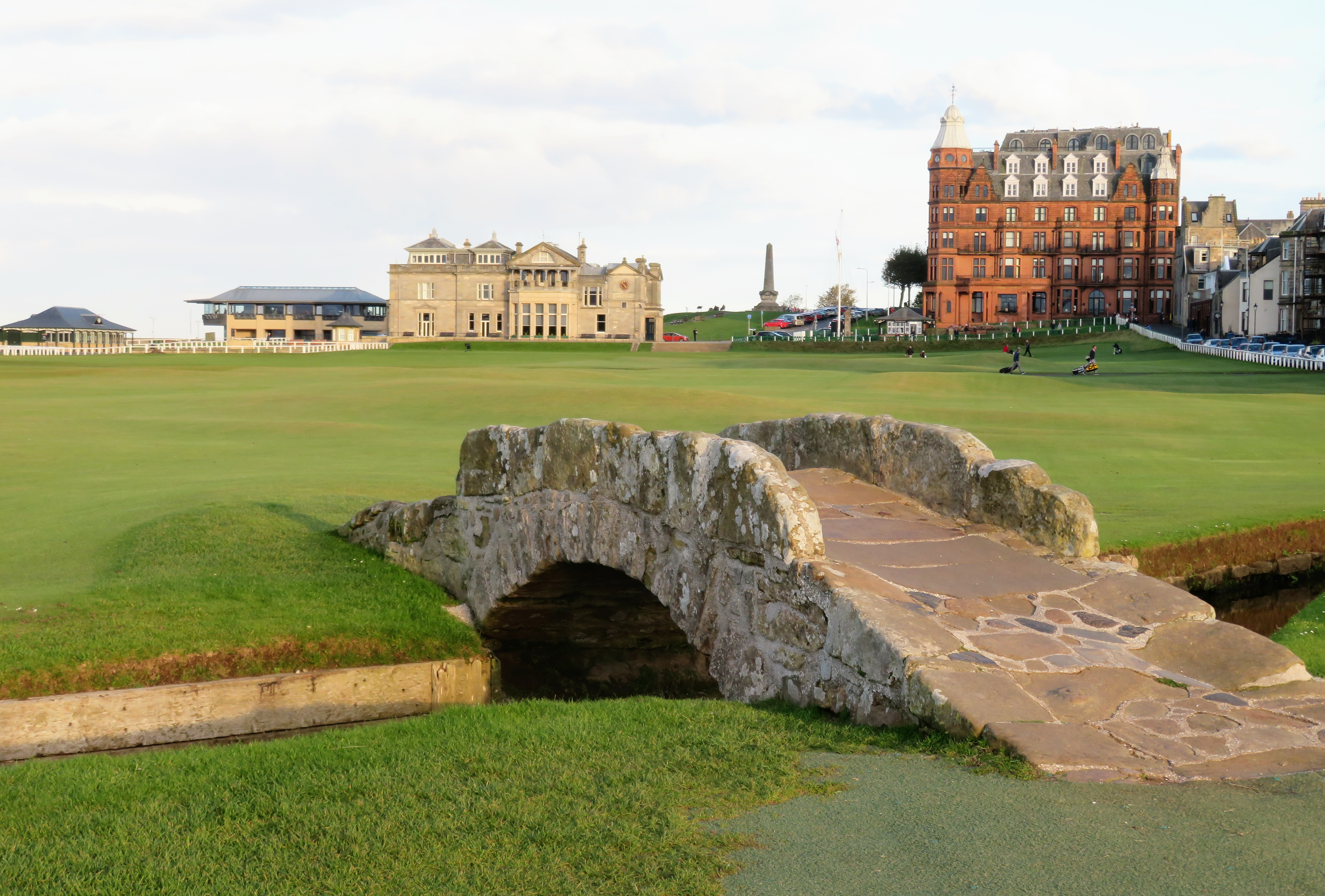
The 18th hole at the Old Course at St Andrews, Scotland

=== Course layout ===
Hole	Name	Yards	Par	Hole	Name	Yards	Par
1	Burn	375	4	10	Bobby Jones	341	4
2	Dyke	400	4	11	High (In)	165	3
3	Cartgate (Out)	366	4	12	Heathery (In)	351	4
4	Ginger Beer	413	4	13	Hole O'Cross (In)	430	4
5	Hole O'Cross (Out)	525	5	14	Long	577	5
6	Heathery (Out)	370	4	15	Cartgate (In)	415	4
7	High (Out)	361	4	16	Corner of the Dyke	380	4
8	Short	173	3	17	Road	439	4
9	End	349	4	18	Tom Morris	354	4
Out		3,332	36	In		3,452	36
Source:				Total		6,784	72

== Field ==
The field was made up of 144 players. As with previous tournaments, most players earned exemptions based on past performance on the Ladies European Tour, the LPGA Tour, previous major championships, or with a high ranking in the Women's World Golf Rankings. The rest of the field earned entry by successfully competing in qualifying tournaments open to any female golfer, professional or amateur, with a low handicap.

=== Exemptions ===
Players who were qualified for the event are listed below. Players are listed under the first category in which they qualified.

1. Winners of the Women's British Open, aged 60 or younger at the scheduled end of the championship, provided they are still active members of a recognised tour.

- Ashleigh Buhai (5,7)
- Georgia Hall (5,7)
- Ariya Jutanugarn (5)
- In-Kyung Kim
- Stacy Lewis
- Catriona Matthew
- Anna Nordqvist
- Sophia Popov
- Hinako Shibuno (7)
- Jiyai Shin (2,7)
- Yani Tseng
- Lilia Vu (2,5,7,10,13)
- Karrie Webb
- Helen Alfredsson, Laura Davies, Sophie Gustafson, Jang Jeong, Emilee Klein, Karen Lunn, Mo Martin, Liselotte Neumann, Lorena Ochoa, Pak Se-ri, Inbee Park, Annika Sörenstam, and Karen Stupples did not play

2. The top 10 finishers and ties from the 2023 Women's British Open.

- Allisen Corpuz (5,7,15)
- Olivia Cowan
- Ally Ewing (5,7)
- Charley Hull (3,5,7)
- Kim Hyo-joo (5,7,10)
- Andrea Lee (7)
- Amy Yang (5,7,10,14)
- Angel Yin (5,7)

3. The top 15 on the final 2023 LET Order of Merit.

- Aditi Ashok
- Céline Boutier (5,7,16)
- Trichat Cheenglab
- Gabriella Cowley
- Diksha Dagar
- Alexandra Försterling (10)
- Linn Grant (5,7,10)
- Johanna Gustavsson
- Nuria Iturrioz
- Sara Kjellker
- Ana Peláez
- Lisa Pettersson
- Klára Spilková
- Anne van Dam

4. The top 5 on the 2024 LET Order of Merit not already exempt (as of 22 July 2024).

- Nicole Broch Estrup
- María Hernández
- Stephanie Kyriacou
- Emma Spitz
- Lauren Walsh

5. The top 35 on the final 2023 Race to the CME Globe points list.

- Carlota Ciganda (7)
- Ayaka Furue (7,10,16)
- Hannah Green (7,10)
- Nasa Hataoka (7)
- Brooke Henderson (7,16)
- Megan Khang (7)
- Grace Kim
- Kim A-lim (15)
- Cheyenne Knight
- Ko Jin-young (7,16)
- Nelly Korda (7,10,13,14)
- Jennifer Kupcho (13)
- Alison Lee (7)
- Minjee Lee (7,15,16)
- Lin Xiyu (7)
- Leona Maguire (7,10)
- Ryu Hae-ran (7)
- Yuka Saso (7,10,15)
- Jenny Shin
- Maja Stark (7)
- Atthaya Thitikul (7)
- Yin Ruoning (7,14)
- Rose Zhang (7,10)

6. The top 25 on the 2023 Race to the CME Globe points list not already exempt (as of 22 July 2024).

- Marina Alex
- An Na-rin
- Pajaree Anannarukarn
- Pei-Yun Chien
- Choi Hye-jin
- Lauren Coughlin (10)
- Gemma Dryburgh
- Esther Henseleit
- Auston Kim
- Lee Mi-hyang
- Lucy Li
- Gaby López
- Nanna Koerstz Madsen
- Wichanee Meechai
- Hira Naveed
- Yuna Nishimura
- Yealimi Noh
- Ryann O'Toole
- Alexa Pano
- Emily Kristine Pedersen
- Paula Reto
- Mao Saigo
- Sarah Schmelzel
- Thidapa Suwannapura
- Albane Valenzuela

7. The top 50 in the Women's World Golf Rankings (as of 8 July 2024).

- Im Jin-hee
- Akie Iwai
- Chisato Iwai (8)
- Kim Sei-young (14)
- Lydia Ko (10,18)
- Sakura Koiwai
- Gabriela Ruffels
- Madelene Sagström
- Rio Takeda (8)
- Patty Tavatanakit (10,13)
- Lexi Thompson
- Chanettee Wannasaen (10)
- Miyū Yamashita (8,11)

Addition players added at Championship Committee's discretion.

- Minami Katsu
- Yui Kawamoto
- Haruka Kawasaki
- Lee So-mi
- Kokona Sakurai
- Ai Suzuki
- Arpichaya Yubol
- Shuri Sakuma
- Hwang You-min, Lee Ye-won, Park Hyun-kyung, Park Ji-young, Park Min-ji did not play

8. The top 3 on the JLPGA Money List not already exempt as of the Suntory Ladies Open.

9. The top 2 on the KLPGA Money List not already exempt (as of 8 July 2024).

10. Winners of any recognised LET or LPGA Tour events in the 2024 calendar year.

- Manon De Roey
- Perrine Delacour
- Alice Hewson
- Moriya Jutanugarn
- Bronte Law
- Marta Martín
- Jana Melichová
- Morgane Métraux
- Linnea Ström
- Chiara Tamburlini
- Shannon Tan
- Bailey Tardy
- Amy Taylor
- Mariajo Uribe did not play

11. Winner of the 2023 JLPGA Money List.

12. Winners of the 2023 KLPGA Money List.

13. Winners of the last five editions of the Chevron Championship.

- Mirim Lee did not play

14. Winners of the last five editions of the Women's PGA Championship.

- Chun In-gee did not play

15. Winners of the last five editions of the U.S. Women's Open.

16. Winners of the last five editions of The Evian Championship.

17. The leading two (not otherwise exempt) in the 2024 Suntory Ladies Open.

- Momoko Osato
- Hikaru Yoshimoto

18. Gold medal winner at the 2024 Olympics.

19. A minimum of leading three golfers, not otherwise exempt, from the ISPS Handa Women's Scottish Open.

- Lily May Humphreys
- Caroline Inglis
- Haeji Kang

20. Winner of the 2023 and 2024 U.S. Women's Amateur.

- Rianne Malixi and Megan Schofill did not play

21. The 2023 and 2024 Mark H. McCormack Medal winner.

- Lottie Woad (24,a)
- Ingrid Lindblad turned professional thus forfeiting her exemption

22. Winner of the 2023 and 2024 Women's Amateur Asia-Pacific

- Wu Chun-wei (a)

23. Winner of the 2023 Women's Amateur Latin America.

- Ela Anacona (a)

24. Winner of the 2024 Augusta National Women's Amateur.

25. Winner of the 2024 Women's Amateur Championship.

- Melanie Green did not play

26. Winner of the 2024 European Ladies Amateur Championship.

- Louise Rydqvist (a)

27. Women's Amateur Series winner (If winner is already exempt, then the highest ranked women in the World Amateur Golf Ranking, not already exempt, as of week 30.).

- Julia López Ramirez (a)

28. Any player who did not compete in the previous year's Women's British Open due to maternity, who subsequently received an extension of membership for the maternity from the player's home tour in the previous year, provided she was otherwise qualified to compete in the previous year's Women's British Open.

=== Final Qualifying ===
Final Qualifying was played over 18 holes on 19 August at the Crail Golfing Society with 12 qualifying places available.

- Casandra Alexander
- Jodi Ewart Shadoff
- Annabell Fuller
- Kristen Gillman
- Emma Grechi
- Lauren Hartlage
- Noora Komulainen
- Stephanie Meadow
- Lee-Anne Pace
- Patricia Isabel Schmidt
- Ursula Wikström
- Zhang Weiwei

== Round summaries ==
=== First round ===
Thursday, 22 August 2024

Place	Player	Score	To par
1	(England) Charley Hull	67	−5
T2	(United States) Nelly Korda	68	−4
T2	(China) Yin Ruoning	68	−4
T4	(United States) Andrea Lee	69	−3
T4	(South Korea) Lee Mi-hyang	69	−3
T4	(Japan) Mao Saigo	69	−3
T4	(South Korea) Jenny Shin	69	−3
T4	(Thailand) Patty Tavatanakit	69	−3
T4	(United States) Lilia Vu	69	−3
T10	(South Korea) Kim Hyo-joo	70	−2
T10	(Japan) Momoko Osato	70	−2

=== Second round ===
Friday, 23 August 2024

Place	Player	Score	To par
1	(United States) Nelly Korda	68-68=136	−8
T2	(England) Charley Hull	67-72=139	−5
T2	(United States) Lilia Vu	69-70=139	−5
4	(China) Yin Ruoning	68-72=140	−4
T5	(South Africa) Casandra Alexander	73-68=141	−3
T5	(South Africa) Ashleigh Buhai	72-69=141	−3
T5	(Chinese Taipei) Pei-Yun Chien	72-69=141	−3
T5	(New Zealand) Lydia Ko	71-70=141	−3
T5	(Sweden) Louise Rydqvist (a)	74-67=141	−3
T5	(Japan) Mao Saigo	69-72=141	−3

=== Third round ===
Saturday, 24 August 2024

Place	Player	Score	To par
1	(South Korea) Jiyai Shin	71-71-67=209	−7
2	(United States) Lilia Vu	69-70-71=210	−6
3	(United States) Nelly Korda	68-68-75=211	−5
T4	(New Zealand) Lydia Ko	71-70-71=212	−4
T4	(South Korea) Jenny Shin	69-73-70=212	−4
T6	(South Korea) Im Jin-hee	74-68-71=213	−3
T6	(United States) Alexa Pano	75-69-69=213	−3
T6	(Thailand) Atthaya Thitikul	72-71-70=213	−3
T6	(China) Yin Ruoning	68-72-73=213	−3
T10	(South Africa) Casandra Alexander	73-68-73=214	−2
T10	(Germany) Esther Henseleit	77-71-66=214	−2
T10	(England) Charley Hull	67-72-75=214	−2
T10	(Japan) Mao Saigo	69-72-73=214	−2
T10	(Switzerland) Albane Valenzuela	74-74-66=214	−2
T10	(England) Lottie Woad (a)	72-70-72=214	−2

=== Final round ===
Sunday, 25 August 2024

Champion
Smyth Salver winner (low amateur)
(a) = amateur
(c) = past champion

Place	Player	Score	To par	Money ($)
1	(New Zealand) Lydia Ko	71-70-71-69=281	−7	1,425,000
T2	(United States) Nelly Korda	68-68-75-72=283	−5	594,759
T2	(South Korea) Jiyai Shin (c)	71-71-67-74=283	−5	594,759
T2	(United States) Lilia Vu (c)	69-70-71-73=283	−5	594,759
T2	(China) Yin Ruoning	68-72-73-70=283	−5	594,759
6	(Thailand) Ariya Jutanugarn (c)	72-72-71-70=285	−3	319,336
T7	(South Africa) Casandra Alexander	73-68-73-72=286	−2	236,366
T7	(Japan) Akie Iwai	74-70-73-69=286	−2	236,366
T7	(Japan) Mao Saigo	69-72-73-72=286	−2	236,366
T10	(Thailand) Pajaree Anannarukarn	75-73-68-71=287	−1	160,250
T10	(Sweden) Linn Grant	77-71-68-71=287	−1	160,250
T10	(South Korea) Im Jin-hee	74-68-71-74=287	−1	160,250
T10	(Denmark) Nanna Koerstz Madsen	73-73-70-71=287	−1	160,250
T10	(United States) Alexa Pano	75-69-69-74=287	−1	160,250
T10	(England) Lottie Woad (a)	72-70-72-73=287	−1	0
T10	(United States) Angel Yin	78-70-69-70=287	−1	160,250

Leaderboard below the top 10
Place	Player	Score	To par	Money ($)
T17	(South Korea) Jenny Shin	69-73-70-76=288	E	121,000
T17	(Thailand) Atthaya Thitikul	72-71-70-75=288	E	121,000
T17	(Netherlands) Anne van Dam	73-74-73-68=288	E	121,000
T20	(England) Charley Hull	67-72-75-75=289	+1	108,235
T20	(Switzerland) Albane Valenzuela	74-74-66-75=289	+1	108,235
T22	(France) Céline Boutier	77-69-71-73=290	+2	91,414
T22	(South Africa) Ashleigh Buhai (c)	72-69-78-71=290	+2	91,414
T22	(England) Georgia Hall (c)	71-72-76-71=290	+2	91,414
T22	(United States) Andrea Lee	69-73-75-73=290	+2	91,414
T22	(South Korea) Lee So-mi	74-73-69-74=290	+2	91,414
T22	(Japan) Momoko Osato	70-76-77-67=290	+2	91,414
T22	(Sweden) Linnea Ström	71-73-74-72=290	+2	91,414
T29	(Japan) Minami Katsu	75-71-74-71=291	+3	68,572
T29	(Japan) Yui Kawamoto	73-72-73-73=291	+3	68,572
T29	(South Korea) Kim Hyo-joo	70-74-71-76=291	+3	68,572
T29	(United States) Alison Lee	75-69-72-75=291	+3	68,572
T29	(Spain) Julia López Ramirez (a)	72-74-74-71=291	+3	0
T29	(South Africa) Paula Reto	77-69-76-69=291	+3	68,572
T29	(United States) Sarah Schmelzel	73-73-73-72=291	+3	68,572
T29	(United States) Rose Zhang	72-76-69-74=291	+3	68,572
T37	(Denmark) Nicole Broch Estrup	76-70-73-73=292	+4	45,568
T37	(South Korea) Choi Hye-jin	74-74-71-73=292	+4	45,568
T37	(Spain) Carlota Ciganda	75-73-70-74=292	+4	45,568
T37	(United States) Ally Ewing	73-69-76-74=292	+4	45,568
T37	(Japan) Ayaka Furue	75-73-73-71=292	+4	45,568
T37	(Japan) Nasa Hataoka	75-73-71-73=292	+4	45,568
T37	(Germany) Esther Henseleit	77-71-66-78=292	+4	45,568
T37	(Australia) Grace Kim	77-71-73-71=292	+4	45,568
T37	(South Korea) Kim Sei-young	76-72-71-73=292	+4	45,568
T37	(Republic of Ireland) Leona Maguire	73-72-71-76=292	+4	45,568
T37	(Thailand) Wichanee Meechai	73-72-77-70=292	+4	45,568
T37	(South Korea) Amy Yang	74-73-70-75=292	+4	45,568
T49	(United States) Kristen Gillman	77-71-71-74=293	+5	30,688
T49	(United States) Caroline Inglis	78-66-74-75=293	+5	30,688
T49	(Mexico) Gaby López	72-75-69-77=293	+5	30,688
T49	(South Korea) Ryu Hae-ran	78-69-72-74=293	+5	30,688
T49	(Thailand) Arpichaya Yubol	75-73-72-73=293	+5	30,688
T49	(China) Zhang Weiwei	72-75-73-73=293	+5	30,688
T55	(Japan) Haruka Kawasaki	71-74-76-73=294	+6	24,943
T55	(South Korea) Lee Mi-hyang	69-74-75-76=294	+6	24,943
T55	(China) Lin Xiyu	78-70-72-74=294	+6	24,943
T55	(South Africa) Lee-Anne Pace	74-73-73-74=294	+6	24,943
T55	(United States) Lexi Thompson	76-71-71-76=294	+6	24,943
T60	(South Korea) An Na-rin	74-74-72-75=295	+7	19,105
T60	(England) Gabriella Cowley	77-70-73-75=295	+7	19,105
T60	(Germany) Alexandra Försterling	76-72-71-76=295	+7	19,105
T60	(England) Lily May Humphreys	74-72-77-72=295	+7	19,105
T60	(Spain) Nuria Iturrioz	75-70-73-77=295	+7	19,105
T60	(Australia) Stephanie Kyriacou	76-68-72-79=295	+7	19,105
T60	(Spain) Marta Martín	74-73-72-76=295	+7	19,105
T60	(Sweden) Louise Rydqvist (a)	74-67-78-76=295	+7	0
T60	(Japan) Shuri Sakuma	72-73-74-76=295	+7	19,105
T60	(Singapore) Shannon Tan	75-69-76-75=295	+7	19,105
T60	(Thailand) Patty Tavatanakit	69-73-73-80=295	+7	19,105
T71	(Chinese Taipei) Pei-Yun Chien	72-69-76-79=296	+8	13,988
T71	(Belgium) Manon De Roey	72-75-76-73=296	+8	13,988
T71	(Sweden) Johanna Gustavsson	73-74-75-74=296	+8	13,988
T71	(Austria) Emma Spitz	76-72-74-74=296	+8	13,988
T71	(Sweden) Maja Stark	73-73-73-77=296	+8	13,988
T76	(France) Emma Grechi	73-74-74-76=297	+9	10,661
T76	(Switzerland) Morgane Métraux	76-72-73-76=297	+9	10,661
T78	(Argentina) Ela Anacona (a)	72-76-72-78=298	+10	0
T78	(United States) Auston Kim	73-75-70-80=298	+10	10,127
T78	(United States) Bailey Tardy	76-72-72-78=298	+10	10,127
81	(South Korea) Kim In-Kyung (c)	73-73-78-75=299	+11	9,726
82	(Finland) Ursula Wikström	77-71-71-81=300	+12	9,459
CUT	(France) Perrine Delacour	74-75=149	+5	
CUT	(United States) Megan Khang	74-75=149	+5	
CUT	(Japan) Sakura Koiwai	71-78=149	+5	
CUT	(England) Bronte Law	73-76=149	+5	
CUT	(Northern Ireland) Stephanie Meadow	77-72=149	+5	
CUT	(Sweden) Madelene Sagström	78-71=149	+5	
CUT	(Thailand) Thidapa Suwannapura	77-72=149	+5	
CUT	(Japan) Hikaru Yoshimoto	72-77=149	+5	
CUT	(Thailand) Trichat Cheenglab	77-73=150	+6	
CUT	(United States) Lauren Coughlin	76-74=150	+6	
CUT	(Finland) Noora Komulainen	76-74=150	+6	
CUT	(United States) Jennifer Kupcho	73-77=150	+6	
CUT	(United States) Lucy Li	74-76=150	+6	
CUT	(Japan) Yuna Nishimura	78-72=150	+6	
CUT	(United States) Yealimi Noh	78-72=150	+6	
CUT	(Sweden) Lisa Pettersson	76-74=150	+6	
CUT	(Germany) Sophia Popov (c)	76-74=150	+6	
CUT	(Japan) Rio Takeda	77-73=150	+6	
CUT	(Chinese Taipei) Yani Tseng (c)	73-77=150	+6	
CUT	(United States) Allisen Corpuz	78-73=151	+7	
CUT	(England) Jodi Ewart Shadoff	78-73=151	+7	
CUT	(England) Annabell Fuller	75-76=151	+7	
CUT	(Australia) Hannah Green	77-74=151	+7	
CUT	(Spain) María Hernández	75-76=151	+7	
CUT	(England) Alice Hewson	77-74=151	+7	
CUT	(Japan) Chisato Iwai	76-75=151	+7	
CUT	(South Korea) Haeji Kang	80-71=151	+7	
CUT	(Scotland) Catriona Matthew (c)	77-74=151	+7	
CUT	(Japan) Yuka Saso	75-76=151	+7	
CUT	(India) Aditi Ashok	76-76=152	+8	
CUT	(United States) Lauren Hartlage	76-76=152	+8	
CUT	(South Korea) Kim A-lim	77-75=152	+8	
CUT	(Sweden) Sara Kjellker	75-77=152	+8	
CUT	(United States) Ryann O'Toole	77-75=152	+8	
CUT	(Republic of Ireland) Lauren Walsh	75-77=152	+8	
CUT	(Thailand) Chanettee Wannasaen	79-73=152	+8	
CUT	(United States) Marina Alex	80-73=153	+9	
CUT	(India) Diksha Dagar	77-76=153	+9	
CUT	(Canada) Brooke Henderson	77-76=153	+9	
CUT	(United States) Cheyenne Knight	78-75=153	+9	
CUT	(Australia) Minjee Lee	78-75=153	+9	
CUT	(Germany) Patricia Isabel Schmidt	76-77=153	+9	
CUT	(Czech Republic) Klára Spilková	76-77=153	+9	
CUT	(Chinese Taipei) Wu Chun-wei (a)	75-78=153	+9	
CUT	(Japan) Miyū Yamashita	76-77=153	+9	
CUT	(Scotland) Gemma Dryburgh	79-75=154	+10	
CUT	(South Korea) Ko Jin-young	76-78=154	+10	
CUT	(Czech Republic) Jana Melichová	81-73=154	+10	
CUT	(England) Amy Taylor	83-71=154	+10	
CUT	(Sweden) Anna Nordqvist (c)	79-76=155	+11	
CUT	(Denmark) Emily Kristine Pedersen	74-81=155	+11	
CUT	(Japan) Ai Suzuki	76-79=155	+11	
CUT	(Germany) Olivia Cowan	78-78=156	+12	
CUT	(United States) Stacy Lewis (c)	80-76=156	+12	
CUT	(Australia) Hira Naveed	80-76=156	+12	
CUT	(Switzerland) Chiara Tamburlini	81-75=156	+12	
CUT	(Australia) Gabriela Ruffels	81-76=157	+13	
CUT	(Thailand) Moriya Jutanugarn	79-79=158	+14	
CUT	(Japan) Hinako Shibuno (c)	80-78=158	+14	
CUT	(Australia) Karrie Webb (c)	82-77=159	+15	
CUT	(Japan) Kokona Sakurai	82-78=160	+16	
DQ	(Spain) Ana Peláez (Note: Peláez was disqualified following her second round due to her caddie using a distance-measuring device.)	72-74=146	+2	

==== Scorecard ====
Hole	1	2	3	4	5	6	7	8	9	10	11	12	13	14	15	16	17	18
Par	4	4	4	4	5	4	4	3	4	4	3	4	4	5	4	4	4	4
(New Zealand) Ko	−4	−4	−4	−5	−5	−5	−5	−5	−5	−6	−6	−6	−6	−7	−6	−6	−6	−7
(United States) Korda	−5	−5	−5	−5	−6	−5	−6	−6	−7	−8	−8	−8	−8	−6	−6	−6	−5	−5
(South Korea) Shin	−7	−7	−6	−6	−6	−6	−7	−7	−7	−7	−6	−6	−6	−6	−5	−5	−4	−5
(United States) Vu	−6	−6	−6	−6	−6	−6	−6	−6	−6	−5	−4	−5	−5	−6	−6	−6	−6	−5
(China) Yin	−3	−2	−3	−3	−3	−3	−3	−3	−4	−4	−4	−4	−4	−4	−5	−5	−5	−5

Cumulative tournament scores, relative to par

Birdie	Bogey	Double bogey
