= 2025 Ladies European Tour =

Professional women's golf tour

2025 Ladies European Tour season
- Duration: February 2025 – November 2025
- Number of official events: 28
- Most wins: (England) Mimi Rhodes (3)
- Order of Merit: (Singapore) Shannon Tan
- Player of the Year: (Singapore) Shannon Tan
- Rookie of the Year: (England) Mimi Rhodes
- Lowest stroke average: (South Africa) Casandra Alexander

The 2025 Ladies European Tour was a series of golf tournaments for elite female golfers from around the world. The tournaments were sanctioned by the Ladies European Tour (LET).

== Changes for 2025 ==
=== Tournaments ===
The Australian swing with Women's NSW Open and Australian Women's Classic continued, with a third tournament, the Australian WPGA Championship, added in Queensland.

Events in Belgium and Tenerife returned to the schedule, while the Magical Kenya Ladies Open dropped out. The AIG Women's Open will be held in Wales for the first time.

The Ladies Italian Open and one additional event remained unconfirmed at the time of release of the rest of the schedule. Confirmed, it would bring the number of events to 30 across 20 countries.

=== Purses ===
The Aramco Team Series was renamed the PIF Global Series and events saw a purse increase from $1m to $2m.

== Schedule ==
The table below shows the 2025 schedule.

Key

Major championships
Regular events
Flagship events
Team championships

Date	Tournament	Location	Winner (Note: The numbers in brackets after the winners' names indicate the career wins on the Ladies European Tour, including that event, and is only shown for members of the tour.)	WWGR points	Purse (€)	Notes
8 Feb	Lalla Meryem Cup	Morocco	(England) Cara Gainer (1)	14	450,000	
15 Feb	PIF Saudi Ladies International	Saudi Arabia	(Thailand) Atthaya Thitikul (5)	26	$4,500,000	Individual event
~~9 Mar~~	Australian WPGA Championship	Australia	Cancelled due to Cyclone Alfred		~~350,000~~	Co-sanctioned with the WPGA Tour of Australasia
16 Mar	Australian Women's Classic	Australia	(Belgium) Manon De Roey (3)	14	300,000	Co-sanctioned with the WPGA Tour of Australasia
23 Mar	Ford Women's NSW Open	Australia	(England) Mimi Rhodes (1)	12	300,000	Co-sanctioned with the WPGA Tour of Australasia
6 Apr	Joburg Ladies Open	South Africa	(England) Mimi Rhodes (2)	14	300,000	Co-sanctioned with the Sunshine Ladies Tour
13 Apr	Investec South African Women's Open	South Africa	(France) Perrine Delacour (2)	14	340,000	Co-sanctioned with the Sunshine Ladies Tour
11 May	Aramco Korea Championship	South Korea	(South Korea) Kim Hyo-joo (n/a)	16	$1,500,000	PIF Global Series individual event
18 May	Dutch Ladies Open	The Netherlands	(England) Mimi Rhodes (3)	12	330,000	
24 May	Jabra Ladies Open	France	(Czech Republic) Sára Kousková (1)	12	300,000	
8 Jun	Tenerife Women's Open	Spain	(Czech Republic) Sára Kousková (2)	12	500,000	
15 Jun	Hulencourt Women's Open	Belgium	(Wales) Darcey Harry (1)	10	300,000	
22 Jun	Tipsport Czech Ladies Open	Czech Republic	(South Africa) Casandra Alexander (1)	10	300,000	
29 Jun	Amundi German Masters	Germany	(Singapore) Shannon Tan (2)	10	300,000	
6 Jul	KPMG Women's Irish Open	Ireland	(England) Lottie Woad (1) (a)	16	450,000	
13 Jul	Amundi Evian Championship	France	(Australia) Grace Kim (n/a)	100	$8,000,000	Co-sanctioned with the LPGA Tour
27 Jul	ISPS Handa Women's Scottish Open	Scotland	(England) Lottie Woad (2)	46	$2,000,000	Co-sanctioned with the LPGA Tour
3 Aug	AIG Women's Open	Wales	(Japan) Miyū Yamashita (n/a)	100	$9,500,000	Co-sanctioned with the LPGA Tour
10 Aug	PIF London Championship	England	(Germany) Laura Fünfstück (1)	18	$1,500,000	PIF Global Series individual event
24 Aug	Hills Ladies Open	Sweden	(Sweden) Meja Örtengren (1) (a)	8	300,000	
7 Sep	Aramco Houston Championship	United States	(Spain) Nuria Iturrioz (5)	18	$1,500,000	PIF Global Series individual event
13 Sep	VP Bank Swiss Ladies Open	Switzerland	(England) Alice Hewson (3)	8	300,000	
21 Sep	La Sella Open	Spain	(Canada) Anna Huang (1)	15	$1,000,000	
27 Sep	Lacoste Ladies Open de France	France	(Canada) Anna Huang (2)	15	400,000	
12 Oct	Hero Women's Indian Open	India	(Singapore) Shannon Tan (3)	8	$500,000	
26 Oct	Wistron Ladies Open	Taiwan	(Chinese Taipei) Yani Tseng (7)	16	$1,000,000	Co-sanctioned with the Taiwan LPGA Tour
8 Nov	Aramco China Championship	China	(China) Ruixin Liu (1)	16.5	$1,500,000	PIF Global Series individual event
30 Nov	Andalucia Costa Del Sol Open De España	Spain	(France) Nastasia Nadaud (1)	19	700,000	

=== Unofficial events ===
The following events appear on the schedule, but do not carry official money or Order of Merit ranking points.

Date	Tournament	Location	Winners	Purse ($)	Notes
14 Feb	PIF Saudi Ladies Team International	Saudi Arabia	(South Korea) Lee So-mi (c) (France) Nastasia Nadaud (England) Amy Taylor (South Korea) Kim Min-sun	500,000	PIF Global Series team event
10 May	Aramco Korea Championship	South Korea	(Czech Republic) Sára Kousková (c) (United States) Brianna Navarrosa (Germany) Patricia Isabel Schmidt (South Africa) Lee-Anne Pace	500,000	PIF Global Series team event
9 Aug	PIF London Championship	England	(South Africa) Danielle du Toit (c) (Australia) Sarah Kemp (Spain) Marta Sanz Barrio (England) Megan Dennis	500,000	PIF Global Series team event
6 Sep	Aramco Houston Championship	United States	(Czech Republic) Sára Kousková (c) (Thailand) April Angurasaranee (Slovenia) Ana Belac (Denmark) Sofie Kibsgaard Nielsen	500,000	PIF Global Series team event
7 Nov	Aramco China Championship	China	(England) Mimi Rhodes (c) (Thailand) Trichat Cheenglab (Czech Republic) Kristýna Napoleaová (Thailand) Kultida Pramphun	500,000	PIF Global Series team event

== Location of tournaments ==
Location of tournaments in Europe.
Major championship
National open
Regular event
PIF Global Series
Location of tournaments outside Europe.
National open
Regular event
PIF Global Series

== Order of Merit rankings ==
The top 10 players in the final Order of Merit Rankings.

Rank	Player	Country	Points
1	Shannon Tan	Singapore	2,462
2	Mimi Rhodes	England	2,279
3	Nastasia Nadaud	France	2,013
4	Casandra Alexander	South Africa	1,855
5	Chiara Tamburlini	Switzerland	1,822
6	Cara Gainer	England	1,677
7	Sára Kousková	Czech Republic	1,659
8	Alice Hewson	England	1,604
9	Helen Briem	Germany	1,590
10	Lauren Walsh	Ireland	1,450

== See also ==
- 2025 LPGA Tour
- 2025 LET Access Series
