= Lottie Woad =

English professional golfer (born 2004)

Personal information
- Full name: Charlotte Woad
- Nickname: Lottie
- Nationality: England
- Born: 17 January 2004 (age 22) Farnham, Surrey, England
- Height: 5 ft 8 in (173 cm)

Career
- Sport: Golf
- College: Florida State University
- Turned professional: 2025
- Current tours: LPGA Tour (since 2025); Ladies European Tour (since 2025)
- Professional wins: 3

Number of wins by tour
- LPGA Tour: 2
- Ladies European Tour: 2

Best results in LPGA major championships
- Chevron Championship: T7: 2026
- Women's PGA C'ship: CUT: 2026
- U.S. Women's Open: T31: 2025
- Women's British Open: T6: 2026
- Evian Championship: T3: 2025

Achievements and awards
- ACC Freshman of the Year: 2023
- WGCA Freshman of the Year: 2023
- FSU Female Athlete of the Year: 2024
- ACC Golfer of the Year: 2024
- Mark H. McCormack Medal: 2024

Charlotte Woad (born 17 January 2004) is an English professional golfer. She won the 2022 Girls Amateur Championship and 2024 Augusta National Women's Amateur, and reached number one in the World Amateur Golf Ranking in June 2024.

Woad won the KPMG Women's Irish Open on the Ladies European Tour in July 2025 while still an amateur. Later that month, she won her first tournament as a professional – the ISPS Handa Women's Scottish Open. In May 2026, she won her second LPGA Tour title at the Kroger Queen City Championship in Cincinnati. She represented Europe in the 2026 Solheim Cup.

== Amateur career ==
In 2021, Woad won the Welsh Women's Open Stroke Play Championship. In May 2022, she made her debut on the Ladies European Tour in the Madrid Open. In August 2022, Woad won the Girls Amateur Championship.

Woad enrolled at Florida State University in 2022 and started playing with the Florida State Seminoles women's golf team. She was WGCA Freshman of the Year, and as a junior FSU Female Athlete of the Year and ACC Golfer of the Year. In September 2023, she won the Annika Intercollegiate title.

In April 2024, Woad won the Augusta National Women's Amateur. She then made her major debut at the 2024 Chevron Championship, where she finished tied-23rd. In May, she finished runner-up to Adéla Cernousek in the individual competition at the NCAA Division I women's golf championship. In June 2024, she rose to number one in the World Amateur Golf Ranking. In August 2024, she was named as the winner of the Mark H. McCormack Medal; this made her the first woman from England to win that medal. Later that month, she was also awarded the Smyth Salver for being the best placed amateur at the Women's British Open. There, she finished in a tie for tenth place overall on the Old Course at St Andrews.

In July 2025, she won the KPMG Women's Irish Open on the Ladies European Tour. She won by six strokes over Madelene Sagström. It was the first win by an amateur on the tour since 2022. Woad tied for 3rd place at the 2025 Evian Championship, one stroke behind the winner. She jumped to 64th in the Rolex Rankings, which is the second-highest ranking for an amateur (after Lydia Ko) since the system debuted in 2006.

== Professional career ==
Woad turned professional after the 2025 Evian Championship. Her finish earned her enough points in the LPGA Elite Amateur Pathway (LEAP) to secure an LPGA Tour card for 2025 and 2026. Her win at the Irish Open also earned her a Ladies European Tour card.

In July 2025, Woad won her first title as a professional after claiming a three-shot victory at the ISPS Handa Women's Scottish Open – the first tournament she played after turning professional. She finished tied-8th at the Women's British Open in August, and third at the Kroger Queen City Championship in September.

Wood finished tied-7th at the 2026 Chevron Championship. In May 2026, she won her second LPGA Tour title at the Kroger Queen City Championship in Cincinnati, finishing with a score of 12-under 268, two strokes ahead of second-placed Ryu Hae-ran. The following month, Woad narrowly missed out on a third LPGA Tour title after she was defeated in a playoff by Miyū Yamashita at the Meijer LPGA Classic. Woad made a costly bogey on the 18th hole of her final round and then lost on the first extra hole after her opponent made a birdie. In August, she finished tied-6th at the Women's British Open.

Woad competed for Europe in the 2026 Solheim Cup at Bernardus Golf in the Nertherlands. She partnered Charley Hull in each of the first four sessions. On day one, the pairing lost in the foursomes and tied their fourballs match. On day two, they were defeated in both the foursomes and fourballs. On day three, she defeated Auston Kim 2 and 1 in the singles. Europe won 15–13 overall to reclaim the trophy from the United States. Later in the year, she joined the indoor TGL League, where she competed for Boston Common Golf.

== Personal life ==
Woad was born in January 2004, the daughter of Rachel and Nick Woad. She comes from Farnham in Surrey, where she attended Weydon School.

== Amateur wins ==
- 2019 Surrey Ladies County Championship
- 2021 The Critchley Astor Salver, Welsh Women's Open Stroke Play Championship
- 2022 Sir Henry Cooper Junior Masters, Girls Amateur Championship, Ivy Intercollegiate
- 2023 Florida State Match Up, Annika Intercollegiate
- 2024 Augusta National Women's Amateur, Landfall Tradition

== Professional wins (3) ==
=== LPGA Tour (2) ===
No.	Date	Tournament	Winning score	To par	Margin of victory	Runner-up	Ref
1	27 Jul 2025	ISPS Handa Women's Scottish Open	67-65-67-68=267	–21	3 strokes	(South Korea) Kim Hyo-joo	
2	17 May 2026	Kroger Queen City Championship	70-64-65-69=268	–12	2 strokes	(South Korea) Ryu Hae-ran	

^{1} Co-sanctioned with Ladies European Tour

LPGA Tour playoff record (0–1)

No.	Year	Tournament	Opponent	Result
1	2026	Meijer LPGA Classic	(Japan) Miyū Yamashita	Lost to birdie on first extra hole

=== Ladies European Tour (2) ===
No.	Date	Tournament	Winning score	To par	Margin of victory	Runner-up	Ref
1	6 Jul 2025	KPMG Women's Irish Open (as an amateur)	68-67-67-69=271	−21	6 strokes	(Sweden) Madelene Sagström	
2	27 Jul 2025	ISPS Handa Women's Scottish Open	67-65-67-68=267	–21	3 strokes	(South Korea) Kim Hyo-joo	

^{2} Co-sanctioned with LPGA Tour

== Results in LPGA majors ==
Tournament	2024	2025	2026
Chevron Championship	T23	CUT	T7
U.S. Women's Open	CUT	T31LA	T49
Women's PGA Championship			CUT
The Evian Championship	CUT	T3LA	T16
Women's British Open	T10LA	T8	T6

Top 10
Did not play

LA = low amateur
CUT = missed the halfway cut
"T" indicates a tie for a place

=== Summary ===
Tournament	Wins	2nd	3rd	Top-5	Top-10	Top-25	Events	Cuts made
Chevron Championship	0	0	0	0	1	2	3	2
U.S. Women's Open	0	0	0	0	0	0	3	2
Women's PGA Championship	0	0	0	0	0	0	1	0
The Evian Championship	0	0	1	1	1	2	3	2
Women's British Open	0	0	0	0	3	3	3	3
Totals	0	0	1	1	5	7	13	9

- Most consecutive cuts made – 5 (2025 U.S. Women's Open – 2026 U.S. Women's Open)
- Longest streak of top-10s – 3 (2025 Evian – 2026 Chevron)

== LPGA Tour career summary ==
Year	Tournaments played	Cuts made*	Wins	2nd	3rd	Top 10s	Best finish	Earnings ($)	Money list rank	Scoring average	Scoring rank
2025	9	7	1	0	2	4	1	831,443	47	69.31	n/a
2026	18	15	1	1		6	1	1,503,489	14	70.85	14
Totals^	27	22	2	1	2	10	1	2,334,932	210		

^ Official as of 30 August 2026
*Includes match play and other tournaments without a cut.

== World ranking ==
Position in Women's World Golf Rankings at the end of each calendar year.

Year	Ranking	Source
2025	11	
2026	7^	

^ As of 31 August 2026

== Team appearances ==
Amateur

- European Young Masters (representing England): 2019
- Girls and Boys Home Internationals (representing England): 2021 (winners)
- Women's and Men's Home Internationals (representing England): 2022 (winners), 2023 (winners), 2024
- European Ladies' Team Championship (representing England): 2022 (winners), 2023
- Espirito Santo Trophy (representing England): 2022, 2023
- Patsy Hankins Trophy (representing Europe): 2023, 2025
- Vagliano Trophy (representing Great Britain & Ireland): 2023, 2025 (winners)
- Arnold Palmer Cup (representing International team): 2023, 2025 (winners)
- Curtis Cup (representing the Great Britain & Ireland): 2024 (winners)

Professional

- Solheim Cup (representing Europe): 2026 (winners)

=== Solheim Cup record ===
Year	Total matches	Total W–L–H	Singles W–L–H	Foursomes W–L–H	Fourballs W–L–H	Points won	Points %
Career	5	1–3–1	1–0–0	0–2–0	0–1–1	1.5	30.0
2026	5	1–3–1	1–0–0 def. A. Kim 2&1	0–2–0 lost w/ C. Hull 4&3 lost w/ C. Hull 6&5	0–1–1 halved w/ C. Hull lost w/ C. Hull 1dn	1.5	30.0
