= 2026 Solheim Cup =

Women's team golf competition

- Dates: 11–13 September 2026
- Venue: Bernardus Golf
- Location: Cromvoirt, North Brabant, Netherlands
- Captains: Anna Nordqvist (Europe); Angela Stanford (USA)
(Europe)	15	13	(United States)
- Europe wins the Solheim Cup

Location map
- Location in Europe Location in The Netherlands

The 2026 Solheim Cup was the 20th edition of the Solheim Cup matches, held 11–13 September at Bernardus Golf in North Brabant, Netherlands. The Solheim Cup is a biennial team competition between the top women professional golfers from Europe and the United States. It returned to even-numbered years in 2024 after the Ryder Cup returned to an odd-year schedule after 2020.

== Format ==
The competition is a three-day match play event between teams of 12 players with a similar format to the Ryder Cup, with each match worth one point. The format is as follows:

- Day 1 (Friday): Four foursomes (alternate shot) matches in a morning session and four fourball (better ball) matches in an afternoon session. A total of eight players from each team participate in each session.
- Day 2 (Saturday): Four foursomes matches in a morning session and four fourball matches in an afternoon session. A total of eight players from each team participate in each session.
- Day 3 (Sunday): 12 singles matches. All 12 players from each team participate.

With a total of 28 points, 14 1/2 points are required to win the Cup, and 14 points are required for the defending champion to retain the Cup. All matches are played to a maximum of 18 holes. If the score is even after 18 holes, each team earns one-half point.

== Venue ==
Bernardus Golf, designed by Kyle Phillips, opened in 2018 and has hosted three editions of the Dutch Open on the European Tour (2021−2023).

== Team qualification and selection ==
=== Team Europe ===
In order to be eligible to be a member of the European team, players are required to:

- be current members of the Ladies European Tour in any category or membership;
- have played in eight Ranking Events (excluding the Excluded Championships) during the Qualifying Period as a member of the LET, unless the relevant player has been selected by the captain;
- be a "European national". To be a "European national", the player must satisfy the criteria set out in the "Nationality Policy" issued by the International Golf Federation.

Team Europe is made up of eight automatic qualifiers – the top two players from the LET Solheim Cup standings, followed by the top six LET members on the Women's World Golf Rankings who were not already qualified via the Solheim Cup standings – and four captain's selections.

=== Team USA ===
In order to be eligible to be a member of the United States team, players are required to be current members of the LPGA Tour and meet one of these three citizenship criteria:

- U.S. citizens by birth, regardless of their birthplace.
- Those who were naturalized as U.S. citizens before age 18.
- Those who became U.S. citizens by adoption before age 13.

Team USA is made up of nine automatic qualifiers – the leading seven players from the LPGA Solheim Cup points rankings and the top two players in the Women's World Golf Rankings not already qualified via the points rankings – and three chosen by the team captain. LPGA Solheim Cup points were earned for top-20 finishes on the LPGA Tour over a two-year period.

== Teams ==
In February 2025, Anna Nordqvist was announced as the European captain, after serving as a playing vice-captain in 2023 and 2024. Caroline Hedwall and Mel Reid were named vice–captains in April. Anne van Dam was named as the third vice–captain at the end of September.

Team Europe
Player	Country	Age	Points rank	Rolex ranking	Previous appearances	Matches	W–L–H	Winning percentage
Charley Hull	England	30	1	6	7	27	15–9–3	61.11%
Esther Henseleit	Germany	27	2	19	1	3	1–1–1	50.00%
Lottie Woad	England	22	5	5	0	Rookie		
Maja Stark	Sweden	26	8	27	2	8	3–3–2	50.00%
Céline Boutier	France	32	28	33	4	14	7–6–1	53.57%
Carlota Ciganda	Spain	36	10	50	7	27	12–11–4	51.85%
Linn Grant	Sweden	27	58	54	2	9	3–6–0	33.33%
Nanna Koerstz Madsen	Denmark	31	32	70	1	3	1–1–1	50.00%
Leona Maguire (P)	Ireland	31	13	83	3	12	8–3–1	70.83%
Julia López Ramírez (P)	Spain	23	59	86	0	Rookie		
Nastasia Nadaud (P)	France	21	16	88	0	Rookie		
Mimi Rhodes (P)	England	24	12	91	0	Rookie		

In March 2025, Angela Stanford was announced as the Team USA captain, after serving as a vice-captain in 2021, 2023, and 2024. On 15 April 2025, Stanford announced Kristy McPherson as her first assistant captain. On 29 April 2025, Stanford announced Paula Creamer as her second assistant captain. On 3 June 2025, Stanford announced Brittany Lang as her third assistant captain.

Team USA
Player	Age	Points rank	Rolex ranking	Previous appearances	Matches	W–L–H	Winning percentage
Nelly Korda	28	1	1	4	16	10–5–1	65.63%
Angel Yin	27	2	25	3	9	5–3–1	61.11%
Jennifer Kupcho	29	3	31	3	10	3–5–2	40.00%
Yealimi Noh	25	4	39	1	3	2–1–0	66.67%
Auston Kim	26	5	22	0	Rookie		
Lauren Coughlin	33	6	18	1	4	3–0–1	87.50%
Allisen Corpuz	28	7	45	2	8	5–2–1	68.75%
Andrea Lee	28	8	40	2	7	3–2–2	57.14%
Alison Lee	31	15	55	2	7	2–5–0	28.57%
Lindy Duncan (P)	35	9	63	0	Rookie		
Rose Zhang (P)	23	13	66	2	7	4–2–1	64.29%
Megan Khang (P)	28	11	85	4	13	7–3–3	65.38%

Angel Yin returned to competition at the FM Championship on 27 August after a two-month injury layoff, and said she would withdraw from the U.S. team if she felt it was in the team's best interests. Lilia Vu travelled with the U.S. team as an alternate in case Yin was unable to play. Once the U.S. confirmed it would field the team as originally selected, Vu flew home on the morning of 11 September to attend her best friend's wedding.

Ages on first day of matches, 13 September; Rolex rankings at team selection. Captain's picks (P) shown in yellow.

== Day one ==
Friday, September 11, 2026

=== Morning foursomes ===
	Results
Hull/Woad	(United States) 4 & 3	Corpuz/Korda
Koerstz Madsen/Boutier	(United States) 3 & 2	Al. Lee/Coughlin
Maguire/Henseleit	(Europe) 2 up	An. Lee/Duncan
Grant/Stark	(Europe) 3 & 2	Zhang/Kupcho
2	Session	2
2	Overall	2

=== Afternoon four-ball ===
	Results
Hull/Woad	halved	Noh/Yin
Koerstz Madsen/Boutier	(United States) 5 & 3	Khang/Al. Lee
Rhodes/Nadaud	(Europe) 2 & 1	Corpuz/Kim
Ciganda/López Ramírez	halved	Korda/Coughlin
2	Session	2
4	Overall	4

== Day two ==
Saturday, September 12, 2026

=== Morning foursomes ===
	Results
Stark/Grant	(Europe) 3 & 2	Corpuz/Korda
Maguire/Henseleit	(Europe) 1 up	Kupcho/Zhang
Rhodes/Nadaud	(Europe) 4 & 3	An. Lee/Kim
Hull/Woad	(United States) 6 & 5	Al. Lee/Coughlin
3	Session	1
7	Overall	5

=== Afternoon four-ball ===
	Results
Stark/Grant	(Europe) 2 & 1	Khang/Coughlin
Hull/Woad	(United States) 1 up	Noh/An. Lee
Maguire/Nadaud	(United States) 3 & 2	Zhang/Kim
Ciganda/Boutier	(United States) 1 up	Kupcho/Duncan
1	Session	3
8	Overall	8

== Day three ==
Sunday, September 13, 2026

=== Singles ===
	Results
Charley Hull	(Europe) 3 & 2	Megan Khang
Esther Henseleit	(United States) 1 up	Alison Lee
Linn Grant	(Europe) 4 & 3	Angel Yin
Mimi Rhodes	(United States) 4 & 2	Nelly Korda
Nanna Koerstz Madsen	(Europe) 2 & 1	Allisen Corpuz
Nastasia Nadaud	(Europe) 3 & 2	Andrea Lee
Julia López Ramírez	(Europe) 3 & 2	Yealimi Noh
Lottie Woad	(Europe) 2 & 1	Auston Kim
Leona Maguire	(United States) 2 & 1	Lauren Coughlin
Maja Stark	(United States) 3 & 1	Lindy Duncan
Carlota Ciganda	(Europe) 4 & 2	Jennifer Kupcho
Céline Boutier	(United States) 2 up	Rose Zhang
7	Session	5
15	Overall	13

== Individual player records ==
Each entry refers to the win–loss–half record of the player.

=== Europe ===
Player	Points	Overall	Singles	Foursomes	Fourballs
Céline Boutier	0	0–4–0	0–1–0	0–1–0	0–2–0
Carlota Ciganda	1.5	1–1–1	1–0–0	0–0–0	0–1–1
Linn Grant	4	4–0–0	1–0–0	2–0–0	1–0–0
Esther Henseleit	2	2–1–0	0–1–0	2–0–0	0–0–0
Charley Hull	1.5	1–3–1	1–0–0	0–2–0	0–1–1
Nanna Koerstz Madsen	1	1–2–0	1–0–0	0–1–0	0–1–0
Julia López Ramírez	1.5	1–0–1	1–0–0	0–0–0	0–0–1
Leona Maguire	2	2–2–0	0–1–0	2–0–0	0–1–0
Nastasia Nadaud	3	3–1–0	1–0–0	1–0–0	1–1–0
Mimi Rhodes	2	2–1–0	0–1–0	1–0–0	1–0–0
Maja Stark	3	3–1–0	0–1–0	2–0–0	1–0–0
Lottie Woad	1.5	1–3–1	1–0–0	0–2–0	0–1–1

=== United States ===
Player	Points	Overall	Singles	Foursomes	Fourballs
Allisen Corpuz	1	1–3–0	0–1–0	1–1–0	0–1–0
Lauren Coughlin	3.5	3–1–1	1–0–0	2–0–0	0–1–1
Lindy Duncan	2	2–1–0	1–0–0	0–1–0	1–0–0
Megan Khang	1	1–2–0	0–1–0	0–0–0	1–1–0
Auston Kim	1	1–3–0	0–1–0	0–1–0	1–1–0
Nelly Korda	2.5	2–1–1	1–0–0	1–1–0	0–0–1
Jennifer Kupcho	1	1–3–0	0–1–0	0–2–0	1–0–0
Alison Lee	4	4–0–0	1–0–0	2–0–0	1–0–0
Andrea Lee	1	1–3–0	0–1–0	0–2–0	1–0–0
Yealimi Noh	1.5	1–1–1	0–1–0	0–0–0	1–0–1
Angel Yin	0.5	0–1–1	0–1–0	0–0–0	0–0–1
Rose Zhang	2	2–2–0	1–0–0	0–2–0	1–0–0
