= Emma Grechi =

French professional golfer (born 1999)

Personal information
- Nationality: France
- Born: 19 January 1998 (age 28) Pessac, France
- Height: 167 cm (5 ft 6 in)

Career
- Sport: Golf
- Turned professional: 2017
- Current tour: Ladies European Tour (joined 2019)
- Former tour: LET Access Series (joined 2017)
- Professional wins: 1

Best results in LPGA major championships
- Chevron Championship: DNP
- Women's PGA C'ship: DNP
- U.S. Women's Open: DNP
- Women's British Open: T76: 2024
- Evian Championship: DNP

Emma Grechi (born 19 January 1998) is a French professional golfer and Ladies European Tour player.

== Early life and amateur career ==
Grechi is from Bordeaux and competed in tennis and judo before discovering golf at 10 years old, thanks to her grandmother. She was educated at Lycée Saint-Joseph-de-Tivoli in Bordeaux, where she obtained a baccalaureate of Management Sciences and Technologies.

In 2014, she was runner-up at the Championnat de France des Jeunes Minimes (U16) behind Agathe Laisné, and at the Championnat de France - Coupe Gaveau behind Anais Meyssonnier. She won the 2015 Championnat de France Cadet, and was runner-up at the same event in 2016.

Grechi represented France in the 2016 European Girls' Team Championship and 2017 European Ladies' Team Championship.

== Professional career ==
Grechi turned professional in 2017 and joined the LET Access Series. In 2019, she won the Belfius Ladies Open, and was runner-up at the Bossey Ladies Championship behind Hayley Davis. 2019 also became her rookie year on the Ladies European Tour (LET), where she played in six tournaments with a best finish of T12 at the dual-ranked Jabra Ladies Open.

In 2021, she finished the season 40th on the LET Order of Merit, after top-ten finishes at the Gant Ladies Open (T9) and the VP Bank Swiss Ladies Open (T7). In 2022, she again finished 40th after recording top-5 finishes at the Magical Kenya Ladies Open and Aramco Team Series – Sotogrande. She was runner-up in the 2023 Aramco Team Series – Florida team event alongside Casandra Alexander and Gabriella Cowley.

In 2024, she made an albatross at the Investec South African Women's Open to win a Renault car, and a hole-in-one at the Aramco Team Series – Shenzhen. She held the co-lead after the first day of the Lacoste Ladies Open de France.

Grechi came through final qualifying at Crail Golfing Society to earn a place at the 2024 Women's British Open at Old Course at St Andrews, where she made the cut.

== Amateur wins ==
- 2015 Grand Prix de Pau, Championnat de France Cadet
- 2016 Grand Prix de Bordeaux-Lac, Open du Bassin D'Arcachon, Grand Prix du Medoc

== Professional wins (1) ==
=== LET Access Series wins (1) ===
No.	Date	Tournament	Winning score	To par	Margin of victory	Runners-up
1	29 Jun 2019	Belfius Ladies Open	71-69-69=209	−7	3 strokes	(Morocco) Ines Laklalech (a) (Spain) Laura Gomez Ruiz (Scotland) Jane Turner

== Results in LPGA majors ==
Tournament	2023	2024
Chevron Championship		
U.S. Women's Open		
Women's PGA Championship		
The Evian Championship		
Women's British Open	CUT	T76

Did not play

CUT = missed the half-way cut
"T" = tied

== Team appearances ==
Amateur

- European Girls' Team Championship (representing France): 2016
- European Ladies' Team Championship (representing France): 2017
