= Anna Huang =

Canadian professional golfer (born 2008)

Personal information
- Nationality: Canada
- Born: 30 October 2008 (age 18) Vancouver, Canada
- Height: 175 cm (5 ft 9 in)

Career
- Sport: Golf
- Turned professional: 2025
- Current tour: Ladies European Tour (joined 2025)
- Professional wins: 4

Number of wins by tour
- Ladies European Tour: 4

Best results in LPGA major championships
- Chevron Championship: DNP
- Women's PGA C'ship: T42: 2026
- U.S. Women's Open: CUT: 2025, 2026
- Women's British Open: CUT: 2025, 2026
- Evian Championship: T22: 2026

Anna Huang (born 30 October 2008) is a Canadian professional golfer and Ladies European Tour (LET) player. In 2025, she won the La Sella Open to become the second Canadian to win an LET title after Brooke Henderson.

== Early life and amateur career ==
Huang was born in Vancouver, and was introduced to golf by her parents around the age of 4.

In 2023, she tied 4th at the Rolex Tournament of Champions, and was part of the winning Team Canada at the World Junior Girls Championship, and individual runner-up.

In 2024, she was runner-up at the Glencoe Invitational, Nike Junior Invitational, and the amateur event at the Mizuho Americas Open.

== Professional career ==
Huang turned professional in 2025 and joined the Ladies European Tour, after she finished tied 29th at Q-School in December 2024. In her rookie year, she qualified for both the U.S. Women's Open and the Women's British Open.

In September 2025, Huang won the La Sella Open in Spain, 7 strokes ahead of Nastasia Nadaud. At only 16 years, 10 months and 22 days, she shot rounds of 64-66-69-69 to become the youngest winner on the LET in 2025, and joins Atthaya Thitikul (14), Lydia Ko (15) and Amy Yang (16) as teenage winners on the tour. The following week she won the Lacoste Ladies Open de France, becoming the first Canadian to record multiple LET victories.

With her third victory at the 2026 Lalla Meryem Cup, she became the youngest player in history to reach three LET wins, at just 17 years, 6 months and 24 days old.

== Amateur wins ==
- 2022 Toyota Tour Cup at Oak Valley
- 2023 Next Tee Invitational

== Professional wins (4) ==
=== Ladies European Tour wins (4) ===
No.	Date	Tournament	Winning score	To par	Margin of victory	Runner(s)-up
1	21 Sep 2025	La Sella Open	64-66-69-69=268	−20	7 strokes	(France) Nastasia Nadaud
2	27 Sep 2025	Lacoste Ladies Open de France	68-64-65=197	−16	2 strokes	(South Africa) Casandra Alexander (Germany) Helen Briem
3	23 May 2026	Lalla Meryem Cup	70-69-66=205	−14	1 stroke	(Australia) Kelsey Bennett
4	9 Aug 2026	PIF London Championship	67-68-65-70=270	−22	2 strokes	(England) Charley Hull

== Results in LPGA majors ==
Tournament	2025	2026
Chevron Championship		
U.S. Women's Open	CUT	CUT
Women's PGA Championship		T42
The Evian Championship		T22
Women's British Open	CUT	CUT

Did not play

CUT = missed the half-way cut
T = tied

== Team appearances ==
Amateur

- World Junior Girls Championship (representing Canada): 2022, 2023 (winners)
