= August Kim =

American professional golfer

August Kim (born July 30, 1995) is an American professional golfer.

== Early life and education ==
Kim was born July 30, 1995, to Chris and Piljo Kim. She attended high school at Herricks High School in New Hyde Park, New York, and Allen D. Nease High School in St. Augustine, Florida. She competed and placed in a variety of American Junior Golf Association and Junior PGA events and qualified for the 2012 U.S. Women's Amateur.

Kim played college golf for Purdue University, where she won three times for the Boilermakers, including the individual Big Ten Championship title in 2016 as a junior. In her 2016–17 senior season, she was named a WGCA First-Team All-American. Kim graduated magna cum laude in 2017 with a degree in biochemistry and a minor in biological sciences.

Kim turned pro in the summer of 2017 and started her professional career competing in the Symetra Tour. She has a younger sister, Auston, who played for Vanderbilt University's women's golf team and is now a professional on the LPGA Tour.

== Professional career ==
Kim made her professional debut, finishing tied for 15th, at the Symetra Tour's Four Winds Invitational in June 2017. Only a few days after her Symetra Tour performance, Kim made her LPGA Tour debut at the Meijer LPGA Classic in Grand Rapids, Michigan. In July, she finished second at the Donald Ross Centennial Classic on the Symetra Tour.

After playing professionally for 5 years, Kim then pivoted into a medical career, matriculating into Vanderbilt University School of Medicine in 2023.

== Amateur wins ==
- 2012 E Z GO Vaughn Taylor Championship
- 2014 Trans Amateur Championship
- 2015 SMU Dallas Athletic Club Invitational
- 2016 Big Ten Championship
- 2017 Henssler Financial Intercollegiate
