= Nastasia Nadaud =

French professional golfer

Personal information
- Nationality: France
- Born: 23 November 2004 (age 21) Chambéry, Aix-les-Bains, France
- Height: 5 ft 6 in (168 cm)

Career
- Sport: Golf
- Turned professional: 2023
- Current tours: LPGA Tour (joined 2026); Ladies European Tour (joined 2023)
- Former tour: LET Access Series (joined 2022)
- Professional wins: 2

Number of wins by tour
- Ladies European Tour: 1

Best results in LPGA major championships
- Chevron Championship: T55: 2026
- Women's PGA C'ship: T48: 2026
- U.S. Women's Open: DNP
- Women's British Open: T44: 2026
- Evian Championship: T21: 2025

Nastasia Nadaud (born 23 November 2004) is a French professional golfer who plays on the LPGA Tour and Ladies European Tour. In 2025, she won the LET season finale, the Andalucia Costa Del Sol Open De España, and finished third in the Order of Merit. She represented Europe at the 2026 Solheim Cup.

== Early life and amateur career ==
Nadaud was born in Chambéry and learned to play at Aix-les-Bains Golf Club 1895 from the age of 6 and she is a life member.

In 2020, Nadaud was runner-up at the Grand Prix De Saint Donat and the Grand Prix de Montpellier Massane, and finished 3rd at the French International Ladies Amateur Championship, four strokes behind winner Charlotte Liautier. In 2021, she finished second at the Championnat de France Cadettes.

In 2022, she won the initial strokeplay qualification at the French International Lady Juniors Amateur Matchplay Championship at Golf de Saint-Cloud, Paris, also known as the Trophée Esmond, but lost in quarter finals.

Nadaud graduated with a baccalaureate in June 2022 and won the German Girls Open the same month. She represented France at the European Girls' Team Championship in Iceland, where her France beat Sweden 4 to 3 in the final.

Nadaud made three LET starts and five on the LET Access Series in 2022 as an amateur. She held the lead at the Lacoste Ladies Open de France after an opening round of 65 (–6).

She won one of the five LETAS events in Sweden, the Göteborg Ladies Open wire-to-wire, and finished 16th in the Order of Merit, earning an exemption into the LET Q-School Final Qualifier at La Manga Club.

== Professional career ==
Nadaud secured a card for the 2023 Ladies European Tour after she finished 3rd at LET Q-School in late 2022, where she several times held the outright lead.

In her rookie LET season, Nadaud recorded a top-10 at the Amundi German Masters. In 2024, she finished 23rd in the season rankings, following a tied 3rd place at the Scandinavian Mixed and a tied 4th place at the Wistron Ladies Open in Taiwan.

In 2025, Nadaud enjoyed a breakout season. She was runner-up at the Hulencourt Women's Open in Belgium, three strokes behind Darcey Harry, and finished second again at the La Sella Open in Spain in September. In November, Nadaud won the Ladies European Tour's season-ending tournament Andalucia Costa Del Sol Open De España by four strokes ahead of compatriot Perrine Delacour. She finished third on the 2025 LET Order of Merit ranking, and rose inside the top-100 on the Women's World Golf Rankings for the first time.

Nadaud secured her card for the 2026 LPGA Tour at Q-Series.

Nadaud competed for Europe in the 2026 Solheim Cup at Bernardus Golf in the Netherlands. She paired with Mimi Rhodes in the day one fourballs, and the duo defeated Allisen Corpuz and Auston Kim 2 and 1. She reunited with Rhodes in the day two foursomes, with the pair recording a 4 and 3 victory over Kim and Andrea Lee. She suffered defeat in the day two fourballs partnering Leona Maguire, before overcoming Andrea Lee 3 and 2 in the singles on day three. Europe reclaimed the trophy from the United States with an overall 15–13 victory.

== Amateur wins ==
- 2019 Grand Prix du Golf Club de Lyon
- 2022 German Girls Open

== Professional wins (2) ==
=== Ladies European Tour wins (1) ===
No.	Date	Tournament	Winning score	To par	Margin of victory	Runner-up
1	30 Nov 2025	Andalucia Costa del Sol Open de España	72-65-69-66=272	–16	4 strokes	(France) Perrine Delacour

=== LET Access Series wins (1) ===
No.	Date	Tournament	Winning score	To par	Margin of victory	Runner-up
1	26 Aug 2022	Göteborg Ladies Open (as an amateur)	68-67-70=205	–11	4 strokes	(Sweden) Emma Thorngren

== Results in LPGA majors ==
Tournament	2025	2026
Chevron Championship		T55
U.S. Women's Open		
Women's PGA Championship		T48
The Evian Championship	T21	T22
Women's British Open	CUT	T44

Did not play

CUT = missed the half-way cut
T = tied

== Team appearances ==
Amateur

- European Girls' Team Championship (representing France): 2022 (winners)

Professional

- Solheim Cup (representing Europe): 2026 (winners)

=== Solheim Cup record ===
Year	Total matches	Total W–L–H	Singles W–L–H	Foursomes W–L–H	Fourballs W–L–H	Points won	Points %
Career	4	3–1–0	1–0–0	1–0–0	1–1–0	3	75.0
2026	4	3–1–0	1–0–0 def. An. Lee 3&2	1–0–0 won w/ M. Rhodes 4&3	1–1–0 won w/ M. Rhodes 2&1 lost w/ L. Maguire 3&2	3	75.0
