= Andrea Lee (golfer) =

American professional golfer (born 1998)

Personal information
- Nationality: United States
- Born: August 15, 1998 (age 28) Los Angeles, California, U.S.
- Height: 5 ft 7 in (1.70 m)

Career
- Sport: Golf
- College: Stanford University
- Turned professional: 2019
- Current tour: LPGA Tour (joined 2020)
- Professional wins: 2

Number of wins by tour
- LPGA Tour: 1
- Epson Tour: 1

Best results in LPGA major championships
- Chevron Championship: T17: 2024
- Women's PGA C'ship: T23: 2025
- U.S. Women's Open: T3: 2024
- Women's British Open: T7: 2020
- Evian Championship: T5: 2025

Achievements and awards
- Mark H. McCormack Medal: 2019
- WGCA Freshman of the Year: 2017
- AJGA Junior Player of Year: 2014
Medal record
Women's golf
Representing United States
Pan American Games
Silver medal – second place	2015 Toronto	Women's individual
Silver medal – second place	2015 Toronto	Mixed team
Summer Universiade
Gold medal – first place	2017 Taipei	Women's team

Andrea Lee (born August 15, 1998) is a Korean-American professional golfer and member of the LPGA Tour. A golf prodigy, in 2015 and 2019 she spent a total of 17 weeks as world number one in the World Amateur Golf Ranking.

== Early life, college and amateur career ==
Lee grew up in Hermosa Beach, California. She started competing at age 8 and won 50 junior titles in four years. At 15, she qualified for the 2014 U.S. Women's Open at Pinehurst and made the cut. She finished the 2014 season as the number one ranked player in the American Junior Golf Association (AJGA) after winning two big tournaments on that circuit, the Rolex Tournament of Champions and the Yani Tseng Invitational. The latter victory earned her an exemption into the 2015 Swinging Skirts LPGA Classic where she finished tied 51st. She received a sponsor's invite for the 2015 ANA Inspiration, missing the cut by one stroke. She led Mira Costa High School to the state title in 2015.

Lee successfully represented the United States at the Junior Ryder Cup, Junior Solheim Cup and the Curtis Cup. She played in the 2016 Espirito Santo Trophy and won silver at the 2015 Pan American Games individually and in the mixed team event with Kristen Gillman, Beau Hossler and Lee McCoy. She won the team gold at the 2017 Summer Universiade in Taipei with Emilee Hoffman and Mariel Galdiano.

Lee played collegiately for Stanford University between 2016 and 2019. She became the most decorated golfer in school history, setting a school record with nine individual titles and topping the Golfweek/Sagarin College Rankings. As a freshman in 2016–17, she was WGCA Freshman of the Year, a finalist for WGCA Player of the Year, and a finalist for the Honda Sports Award for golf.

In 2019, Lee was semi-finalist at the U.S. Women's Amateur, and won the Mark H. McCormack Medal as the world's top-ranked amateur at the end of the season.

== Professional career ==
Lee turned professional in late 2019 after she finished T30 at the LPGA Q-Series to earn status for the 2020 LPGA Tour. In her rookie season, she made 11 cuts in 15 starts with two top-10 finishes, a tie for fifth at the Marathon Classic and a tie for seventh at the 2020 Women's British Open, to finish 48th on the money list.

Lee captured her first professional title at the 2022 Casino Del Sol Golf Classic on the Epson Tour with a par on the third hole of a playoff against her Curtis Cup teammate Lucy Li.

In September 2022, Lee won her first LPGA Tour title at the Portland Classic.

== Amateur wins ==
- 2014 Rolex Tournament of Champions, Yani Tseng Invitational
- 2016 Windy City Collegiate Championship, East Lake Cup, Peg Barnard Invitational
- 2017 Women's Southern California Amateur Championship, Dick McGuire/Branch Law Firm Invitational, Stanford Intercollegiate, Nanea PAC 12 Preview
- 2019 Northrop Grumman Regional Challenge, Ping-ASU Invitational, Molly Collegiate Invitational

== Professional wins (2) ==
=== LPGA Tour wins (1) ===
No.	Date	Tournament	Winning score	To par	Margin of victory	Runner(s)-up	Winner's share ($)
1	Sep 18, 2022	Portland Classic	72-64-67-66=269	−19	1 stroke	(Ecuador) Daniela Darquea	225,000

=== Epson Tour wins (1) ===
No.	Date	Tournament	Winning score	To par	Margin of victory	Runner-up	Winner's share ($)
1	Apr 3, 2022	Casino Del Sol Golf Classic	69-65-67-69=270	−18	Playoff	(United States) Lucy Li	30,000

== Results in LPGA majors ==
Results not in chronological order.

Tournament	2014	2015	2016	2017	2018	2019	2020	2021	2022	2023	2024	2025	2026
Chevron Championship		CUT	CUT	CUT			CUT	CUT		T56	T17	T30	CUT
U.S. Women's Open	T69				CUT	T60			T15	T20	T3	T22	CUT
Women's PGA Championship							CUT	CUT	CUT	CUT	CUT	T23	T32
The Evian Championship							NT		T15	CUT	62	T5	T22
Women's British Open							T7	T55	T28	T9	T22	T11	CUT

Top 10
Did not play

CUT = missed the half-way cut
NT = no tournament
T = tied

=== Summary ===
Tournament	Wins	2nd	3rd	Top-5	Top-10	Top-25	Events	Cuts made
Chevron Championship	0	0	0	0	0	1	9	3
U.S. Women's Open	0	0	1	1	1	4	8	6
Women's PGA Championship	0	0	0	0	0	1	7	2
The Evian Championship	0	0	0	1	1	3	5	4
Women's British Open	0	0	0	0	2	4	7	6
Totals	0	0	1	2	4	13	36	21

- Most consecutive cuts made – 7 (2024 Evian – 2025 British Open)
- Longest streak of top-10s – 1 (four times)

== World ranking ==
Position in Women's World Golf Rankings at the end of each calendar year.

Year	Ranking	Source
2014	746	
2015	696	
2016	1,025	
2017	n/a	
2018	n/a	
2019	797	
2020	118	
2021	136	
2022	31	
2023	55	
2024	53	
2025	20	

== U.S. national team appearances ==
Amateur

- Junior Ryder Cup: 2014 (winners)
- Junior Solheim Cup: 2013 (winners), 2015 (winners)
- Pan American Games: 2015
- Curtis Cup: 2016, 2018 (winners)
- Arnold Palmer Cup: 2018 (winners)
- Espirito Santo Trophy: 2016

Professional

- Solheim Cup: 2023, 2024 (winners), 2026

=== Solheim Cup record ===
Year	Total matches	Total W–L–H	Singles W–L–H	Foursomes W–L–H	Fourballs W–L–H	Points won	Points %
Career	11	4–5–2	0–1–2	1–3–0	3–1–0	5.0	45.5
2023	4	1–2–1	0–0–1 halved w/ G. Hall	1–1–0 won w/ D. Kang 1 up lost w/ D. Kang 1 dn	0–1–0 lost w/ R. Zhang 2&1	1.5	37.5
2024	3	2–0–1	0–0–1 halved w/ E. Henseleit	0–0–0	2–0–0 won w/ R. Zhang 5&4 won w/ R. Zhang 6&4	2.5	83.3
2026	4	1–3–0	0–1–0 lost to N. Nadaud 3&2	0–2–0 lost w/ L. Duncan 2 dn lost w/ A. Kim 4&3	1–0–0 won w/ Y. Noh 1 up	1.0	25.0
