= Maha Haddioui =

Moroccan professional golfer

Personal information
- Nationality: Morocco
- Born: 15 May 1988 (age 38) Casablanca, Morocco
- Height: 5 ft 6 in (168 cm)

Career
- Sport: Golf
- College: Lynn University
- Turned professional: 2011
- Current tour: Ladies European Tour

Best results in LPGA major championships
- Chevron Championship: DNP
- Women's PGA C'ship: DNP
- U.S. Women's Open: DNP
- Women's British Open: CUT: 2016, 2021
- Evian Championship: CUT: 2025

Maha Haddioui (Arabic: ماها الحديوي; born 15 May 1988) is a Moroccan professional golfer who plays on the Ladies European Tour. She is the first Arab with playing privileges on the Ladies European Tour.

She attended Lynn University, where she was the top-ranked golfer in NCAA Division II.

Haddioui qualified for the 2016 Summer Olympics. At the Olympics, she finished in last place.

Haddioui also qualified for the 2020 Summer Olympics, where she scored a hole-in-one, but finished tied for 43rd place at one over par.
