= Darcey Harry =

Welsh professional golfer (born 2003)

Personal information
- Nickname: DH
- Nationality: Wales
- Born: 14 June 2003 (age 23) Dinas Powys, Wales

Career
- Sport: Golf
- College: Royal Agricultural University
- Turned professional: 2024
- Current tour: Ladies European Tour (joined 2025)
- Professional wins: 2

Number of wins by tour
- Ladies European Tour: 1
- Other: 1

Best results in LPGA major championships
- Chevron Championship: DNP
- Women's PGA C'ship: DNP
- U.S. Women's Open: DNP
- Women's British Open: T40: 2025
- Evian Championship: CUT: 2025

Darcey Rose Harry (born 14 June 2003) is a Welsh professional golfer who plays on the Ladies European Tour. She won the 2025 Hulencourt Women's Open.

== Early life and amateur career ==
Harry trained at Royal Porthcawl Golf Club and represented Wales as an amateur at the European Girls' Team Championship, European Ladies' Team Championship, World Junior Girls Championship and the 2022 Espirito Santo Trophy.

She lost the final of the 2022 Welsh Ladies' Amateur Championship on the 19th hole to Ffion Tynan, and was runner-up at the 2024 English Women's Open Amateur Stroke Play Championship, behind Lily Hirst. She won the 2023 R&A Student Tour Series event at Parador Golf in Málaga, Spain.

Harry won the Santander Golf Tour event at La Coruña in 2024, a stroke ahead of home player María Herráez and two ahead of Magdalena Simmermacher in third.

She attended the Royal Agricultural University and graduated with a degree in equine sciences.

== Professional career ==
Harry turned professional in late 2024 and earned her card for the 2025 Ladies European Tour at Q-School, where she won her pre-qualifier at Palm Golf Ourika and finished second behind Daniela Darquea in the final.

She was in contention in her second LET start, the Australian Women's Classic, where she was joint leader after the first round, tied second after the penultimate round, and ultimately tied for 6th.

Harry won her first title on the Ladies European Tour in June 2025, with a three-stroke victory at the Hulencourt Women's Open in Belgium.

== Amateur wins ==
- 2023 R&A Student Tour Series - Spain

== Professional wins (2) ==
=== Ladies European Tour wins (1) ===
No.	Date	Tournament	Winning score	To par	Margin of victory	Runner-up
1	15 Jun 2025	Hulencourt Women's Open	71-68-68-68=275	−13	3 strokes	(France) Nastasia Nadaud

=== Santander Golf Tour wins (1) ===
No.	Date	Tournament	Winning score	To par	Margin of victory	Runner-up
1	17 Oct 2024	Santander Golf Tour La Coruña (as an amateur)	77-67=144	E	1 stroke	(Spain) María Herráez

== Results in LPGA majors ==
Tournament	2025	2026
Chevron Championship		
U.S. Women's Open		
Women's PGA Championship		
The Evian Championship	CUT	
Women's British Open	T40	CUT

Did not play

CUT = missed the half-way cut
T = tied

== Team appearances ==
Amateur

- European Girls' Team Championship (representing Wales): 2018, 2019
- Girls Home Internationals (representing Wales): 2018, 2019
- World Junior Girls Championship (representing Wales): 2019
- European Young Masters (representing Wales): 2019
- Junior Vagliano Trophy (representing Great Britain & Ireland): 2019
- Espirito Santo Trophy (representing Wales): 2022
- Women's and Men's Home Internationals (representing Wales): 2022, 2023, 2024
- European Ladies' Team Championship (representing Wales): 2022, 2023, 2024
