= Marta Martín =

Spanish professional golfer

Personal information
- Full name: Marta Martín García
- Nationality: Spain
- Born: 30 June 1996 (age 30) Madrid, Spain
- Height: 172 cm (5 ft 8 in)

Career
- Sport: Golf
- College: Purdue University
- Turned professional: 2019
- Current tour: Ladies European Tour (joined 2020)
- Former tours: Symetra Tour (joined 2019); LET Access Series (joined 2023)
- Professional wins: 2

Number of wins by tour
- Ladies European Tour: 1
- Other: 1

Best results in LPGA major championships
- Chevron Championship: DNP
- Women's PGA C'ship: DNP
- U.S. Women's Open: DNP
- Women's British Open: T60: 2024
- Evian Championship: T65: 2024

Marta Martín García (born 30 June 1996) is a Spanish professional golfer and Ladies European Tour player. She won the 2024 Tipsport Czech Ladies Open.

== Amateur career ==
Martín won the 2012 Campeonato de España Cadete Reale and reached the quarterfinals of the 2014 Internationaux de France U21 – Trophée Esmond.

She attended Purdue University between 2014 and 2018 and played with the Purdue Boilermakers women's golf team. As a freshman, she tied for 25th at the NCAA Women's Championship and earned All-Big Ten Conference honors.

== Professional career ==
Martín turned professional in 2019 and joined the Symetra Tour. In 2020, she joined the Ladies European Tour after finishing 33rd at Q-School.

Playing on the 2023 LET Access Series, she won her first professional event at the Amundi Czech Ladies Challenge.

In 2024, she finished 3rd at the NSW Women's Open and won her first LET event at the Tipsport Czech Ladies Open.

== Amateur wins ==
- 2012 Campeonato de España Cadete Reale
- 2013 Campeonato de Madrid Junior

== Professional wins (2) ==
=== Ladies European Tour wins (1) ===
No.	Date	Tournament	Winning score	To par	Margin of victory	Runner-up
1	23 Jun 2024	Tipsport Czech Ladies Open	69-67-63=199	−17	4 strokes	(England) Rosie Davies

=== LET Access Series wins (1) ===
No.	Date	Tournament	Winning score	To par	Margin of victory	Runner-up
1	18 Jun 2023	Amundi Czech Ladies Challenge	69-74-72=215	−1	1 stroke	(England) Gemma Clews

== Results in LPGA majors ==
Tournament	2024	2025
Chevron Championship		
U.S. Women's Open		
Women's PGA Championship		
The Evian Championship	T65	
Women's British Open	T60	CUT

Did not play

T = tied
