= Cara Gainer =

English professional golfer

Personal information
- Nationality: England
- Born: 20 August 1995 (age 31)

Career
- Sport: Golf
- College: Cardiff University
- Turned professional: 2020
- Current tour: Ladies European Tour (joined 2021)
- Former tour: LET Access Series (joined 2020)
- Professional wins: 1

Number of wins by tour
- Ladies European Tour: 1

Best results in LPGA major championships
- Chevron Championship: DNP
- Women's PGA C'ship: DNP
- U.S. Women's Open: DNP
- Women's British Open: T41: 2026
- Evian Championship: T14: 2025

Achievements and awards
- LET Access Series Rookie of the Year: 2020

Cara Gainer (born 20 August 1995) is an English professional golfer who plays on the Ladies European Tour. She was runner-up at the 2022 Belgian Ladies Open, the 2023 Amundi German Masters and won the 2025 Lalla Meryem Cup.

== Early life and amateur career ==
Gainer hails from Oxford and started playing golf relatively late, when she was 14-years-old, and became a scratch golfer at 17. Throughout that time she was a member at Frilford Heath Golf Club, along with Eddie Pepperell.

She was part of the Castle Royle High Performance Academy and was Castle Royle Ladies Champion in 2015, 2016, and 2017, and was Ladies' Amateur Champion of Oxfordshire County in 2016.

Gainer won the 2017 English Women's Open Match Play Championship at Royal Mid-Surrey Golf Club, and was in the England squad her final year as an amateur, competing internationally.

She graduated with a geography degree from Cardiff University in 2016.

== Professional career ==
Gainer turned professional in January 2020 after the LET Q-School, and joined the LET Access Series.

In 2020, she recorded four top-20 finishes in five starts including a runner-up finish at the Czech Ladies Challenge in Prague. She ended the year in second place on the Order of Merit behind Tiia Koivisto, earning promotion to the Ladies European Tour (LET). She was also crowned LETAS Rookie of the Year.

In her rookie LET season, Gainer finished 90th in the Race to Costa del Sol. In 2022 she ended the season 41st, after she recorded a second-place finish at the Belgian Ladies Open, one stroke behind Linn Grant. She held the overnight lead at the season finale, the Andalucia Costa Del Sol Open De España, after a 7-under 66 in the opening round, but then produced three rounds of 72 to finish tied 14th.

In 2023, Gainer finished 3rd at the La Sella Open and lost a playoff at the Amundi German Masters to Kristýna Napoleaová to finish the season 16th in the Order of Merit. She captured her maiden LET title at the 2025 Lalla Meryem Cup by birdying the first hole in a playoff against Diksha Dagar.

== Amateur wins ==
- 2017 English Women's Open Match Play Championship

== Professional wins (1) ==
=== Ladies European Tour wins (1) ===
No.	Date	Tournament	Winning score	To par	Margin of victory	Runner-up
1	8 Feb 2025	Lalla Meryem Cup	71-70-69=216	−9	Playoff	(India) Diksha Dagar

Ladies European Tour playoff record (1–1)

No.	Year	Tournament	Opponent	Result
1	2023	Amundi German Masters	(Czech Republic) Kristýna Napoleaová	Lost to birdie on the first extra hole
1	2025	Lalla Meryem Cup	(India) Diksha Dagar	Won with birdie on the first extra hole

== Results in LPGA majors ==
Tournament	2023	2024	2025	2026
Chevron Championship				
U.S. Women's Open				
Women's PGA Championship				
The Evian Championship			T14	T41
Women's British Open	T61		CUT	T41

Did not play

CUT = missed the half-way cut
T = tied
