= Amy Taylor (golfer) =

English professional golfer (born 2000)

Personal information
- Nationality: England
- Born: 2000 (age 25–26) Norwich, England
- Spouse: Sandy Scott

Career
- Sport: Golf
- College: Texas Tech University
- Turned professional: 2022
- Current tour: Ladies European Tour (joined 2023)
- Former tour: LET Access Series (joined 2022)
- Professional wins: 2

Number of wins by tour
- Ladies European Tour: 1
- Other: 1

Best results in LPGA major championships
- Chevron Championship: DNP
- Women's PGA C'ship: DNP
- U.S. Women's Open: DNP
- Women's British Open: CUT: 2024
- Evian Championship: DNP

Amy Taylor (born 2000) is an English professional golfer and Ladies European Tour player. She won the 2024 Ladies Italian Open at Golf Nazionale in Rome.

== Early life and amateur career ==
Taylor was born in Norwich and started playing golf at Bawburgh Golf Club in Norfolk when she was 9. At age 14, she became the youngest ever winner of the Norfolk Ladies County Championship, and represented England Schools for 3 years. She reached the quarter-finals of the 2018 Girls Amateur Championship.

Taylor attended Wymondham College until 2017, before spending four and half years at Texas Tech University playing golf with the Texas Tech Red Raiders women's golf team 2018–22 and majoring in psychology.

== Professional career ==
Taylor turned professional in June 2022 and joined the LET Access Series. She won the season-ending Calatayud Ladies Open in Spain, prevailing in a four-way playoff against Sofie Kibsgaard Nielsen, Momoka Kobori and Elena Moosmann. She finished seventh in the Order of Merit, missing out on winning a full Ladies European Tour card by just one spot, less than 10 points behind Anna Magnusson.

Taylor joined the Ladies European Tour in 2023 after earning status at Q-School. In November 2023, appearing on the WPGA Tour of Australasia she won the Women's NSW Open Regional Qualifier at Wagga Wagga and entered the Women's Australian Open, where she tied for 29th.

In 2024, she won the Ladies Italian Open a stroke ahead of María Hernández of Spain.

== Professional wins (2) ==
=== Ladies European Tour wins (1) ===
No.	Date	Tournament	Winning score	To par	Margin of victory	Runner-up
1	16 Jun 2024	Ladies Italian Open	70-67-69=206	−10	1 stroke	(Spain) María Hernández

=== LET Access Series (1) ===
No.	Date	Tournament	Winning score	To par	Margin of victory	Runner(s)-up
1	14 Oct 2022	Calatayud Ladies Open	70-69-68=207	−9	Playoff	(Denmark) Sofie Kibsgaard Nielsen (New Zealand) Momoka Kobori (Switzerland) Elena Moosmann (a)

LET Access Series playoff record (1–0)

No.	Year	Tournament	Opponents	Result
1	2022	Calatayud Ladies Open	(Denmark) Sofie Kibsgaard Nielsen (New Zealand) Momoka Kobori (Switzerland) Elena Moosmann (a)	Won with birdie on first extra hole
