= Allisen Corpuz =

American professional golfer (born 1998)

Personal information
- Nationality: United States
- Born: March 20, 1998 (age 28) Honolulu, Hawaii, U.S.
- Height: 5 ft 9 in (1.75 m)

Career
- Sport: Golf
- College: University of Southern California
- Turned professional: 2021
- Current tour: LPGA Tour (joined 2022)
- Professional wins: 1

Number of wins by tour
- LPGA Tour: 1

Best results in LPGA major championships
- Chevron Championship: T4: 2023
- Women's PGA C'ship: T5: 2026
- U.S. Women's Open: Won: 2023
- Women's British Open: T6: 2023
- Evian Championship: T26: 2024

Allisen Corpuz (born March 20, 1998) is an American professional golfer and member of the LPGA Tour. She won the 2023 U.S. Women's Open at Pebble Beach.

== Early life, college and amateur career ==
Corpuz, born to a Filipino father from the Ilocos Region and a Korean mother, is a Hawaii native and attended the Punahou School in Honolulu. A golf prodigy, she was a three-time AJGA All-American. In 2008, she surpassed Michelle Wie as the youngest qualifier in U.S. Women's Amateur Public Links history at 10 years, 3 months and 9 days, and was featured in The New York Times under the headline "Golf's Next Wave".

Corpuz won the 2014 Hawaii State Open, represented Hawaii in the 2014 Asia Pacific Junior Cup and represented the West team at 2012 AJGA Wyndham Cup. Before college, she had played in six USGA championships, the second most ever, and posted nine top-10 finishes in AJGA majors and over 15 top-5 AJGA results. As a high school senior in 2016, she was runner-up at the Canadian Women's Amateur Championship and won the Hawaii State High School Championship on the fourth playoff hole. Corpuz also played as an amateur at the 2016 LPGA Lotte Championship at Ko Olina Resort and carded a second-round 72, but missed the cut by three strokes.

Corpuz played college golf at the University of Southern California from 2016 to 2021 where she led the USC Trojans women's golf team with a 71.57 stroke average and was named a first-team All-American. She played in the 2020 and 2021 Arnold Palmer Cup and also represented the United States at the 2021 Curtis Cup.

The 2020 U.S. Women's Open was her third U.S. Open and her 16th USGA championship. Corpuz was the runner-up to Rachel Kuehn in the 2020 North and South Women's Amateur at Pinehurst Resort, losing in 19 holes.

She rose to a career high of 7th in the World Amateur Golf Rankings.

== Professional career ==
Corpuz turned professional in 2021 and finished T16 at Q-School to earn LPGA Tour membership for 2022. In her rookie season, she made 17 cuts in 21 events and finished 41st in the Women's World Golf Rankings. She recorded three top-10 finishes including a runner-up finish at the ISPS Handa World Invitational and a third-place finish at Pelican Women's Championship.

In July 2023, Corpuz won the U.S. Women's Open by three strokes over Charley Hull and Jiyai Shin. She won $2 million, a record. It was her first LPGA Tour win. She rose to a career high world ranking of #8.

== Amateur wins ==
- 2010 AJGA Junior at Quad Cities
- 2016 Winn Grips Heather Farr Classic, Hawaii State High School Championship
- 2021 Lamkin San Diego Invitational, The Gold Rush

== Professional wins (1) ==
=== LPGA Tour wins (1) ===
Legend
Major championships (1)
Other LPGA Tour (0)

No.	Date	Tournament	Winning score	To par	Margin of victory	Runners-up	Winner's share ($)
1	Jul 9, 2023	U.S. Women's Open	69-70-71-69=279	−9	3 strokes	(England) Charley Hull (South Korea) Jiyai Shin	2,000,000

== Major championships ==
=== Wins (1) ===
Year	Championship	54 holes	Winning score	Margin	Runners-up
2023	U.S. Women's Open	1 shot deficit	−9 (69-70-71-69=279)	3 strokes	(England) Charley Hull, (South Korea) Jiyai Shin

=== Results timeline ===
Results not in chronological order.

Tournament	2016	2017	2018	2019	2020	2021	2022	2023	2024	2025	2026
Chevron Championship								T4	T57	T18	T27
U.S. Women's Open	CUT		CUT		CUT		T24	1	CUT	T31	T8
Women's PGA Championship							T30	T15	T19	CUT	T5
The Evian Championship					NT		CUT	T54	T26	T49	CUT
Women's British Open							CUT	T6	CUT	CUT	CUT

Win
Top 10
Did not play

CUT = missed the half-way cut
NT = no tournament
T = tied

=== Summary ===
Tournament	Wins	2nd	3rd	Top-5	Top-10	Top-25	Events	Cuts made
Chevron Championship	0	0	0	1	1	2	4	4
U.S. Women's Open	1	0	0	1	2	3	8	4
Women's PGA Championship	0	0	0	1	1	3	5	4
The Evian Championship	0	0	0	0	0	0	5	3
Women's British Open	0	0	0	0	1	1	5	1
Totals	1	0	0	3	5	9	27	16

- Most consecutive cuts made – 6 (2023 Chevron – 2024 Chevron)
- Longest streak of top-10s – 2 (2026 U.S. Women's – 2026 Women's PGA)

== LPGA Tour career summary ==
Year	Tournaments played	Cuts made*	Wins (Majors)	2nd	3rd	Top 10s	Best finish	Earnings ($)	Money list rank	Scoring average	Scoring rank
2016	2	0	0	0	0	0	MC	n/a	n/a	75.75	n/a
2017	Did not play										
2018	1	0	0	0	0	0	MC	n/a	n/a	74.50	n/a
2019	Did not play										
2020	1	0	0	0	0	0	MC	n/a	n/a	77.00	n/a
2021	Did not play										
2022	24	17	0	1	1	3	2	721,135	41	70.88	41
2023	24	19	1 (1)	1	1	5	1	3,094,813	3	70.59	28
2024	25	21	0	0	0	3	T4	871,020	45	70.97	31
2025	25	19	0	0	1	2	3	686,862	55	70.76	39
Totals	98 (2022)	76 (2022)	1 (1)	2	3	13	1	5,373,830	95		

Official as of 2025 season
*Includes matchplay and other tournaments without a cut.

== World ranking ==
Position in Women's World Golf Rankings at the end of each calendar year.

Year	World ranking	Source
2022	48	
2023	13	
2024	36	
2025	65	

== U.S. national team appearances ==
Amateur

- Curtis Cup: 2021 (winners)
- Arnold Palmer Cup: 2020, 2021 (winners)

Professional

- Solheim Cup: 2023, 2024 (winners), 2026

=== Solheim Cup record ===
Year	Total matches	Total W–L–H	Singles W–L–H	Foursomes W–L–H	Fourballs W–L–H	Points won	Points %
Career	12	6–5–1	1–2–0	5–1–0	0–2–1	6.5	54.2
2023	4	2–1–1	0–1–0 lost to M. Stark 2&1	2–0–0 won w/ N. Korda 1 up won w/ N. Korda 5&3	0–0–1 halved w/ J. Kupcho	2.5	62.5
2024	4	3–1–0	1–0–0 def. A. Nordqvist 4&3	2–0–0 won w/ N. Korda 3&2 won w/ N. Korda 1 up	0–1–0 lost w/ L. Vu 2 dn	3	75.0
2026	4	1–3–0	0–1–0 lost to N. Madsen 2&1	1–1–0 won w/ N. Korda 4&3 lost w/ N. Korda 3&2	0–1–0 lost w/ A. Kim 2&1	1	25.0
