= Hira Naveed =

Australian professional golfer (born 1998)

Personal information
- Nationality: Australia
- Born: 3 February 1998 (age 28) New Zealand
- Height: 5 ft 6 in (1.68 m)

Career
- Sport: Golf
- College: Pepperdine University
- Turned professional: 2019
- Current tour: LPGA Tour (joined 2024)
- Former tour: Epson Tour (joined 2020)
- Professional wins: 1

Best results in LPGA major championships
- Chevron Championship: CUT: 2024, 2025
- Women's PGA C'ship: 77th: 2025
- U.S. Women's Open: DNP
- Women's British Open: CUT: 2024, 2025
- Evian Championship: T65: 2025

Achievements and awards
- Western Australia Junior Girls Golfer of the Year: 2015
- West Coast Conference Player of the Year: 2019

Hira Naveed (born 3 February 1998) is an Australian professional golfer and LPGA Tour player. She was runner-up at the 2024 Ford Championship.

== Early life and amateur career ==
Naveed was born in New Zealand and grew up in Perth, Western Australia. In 2015, she won the Dunes Medal and the Victorian Junior Masters, and was named Western Australia Junior Girls Golfer of the Year.

Naveed played collegiate golf at Pepperdine University between 2015 and 2019 and was a four-time All-WCC first team pick. She was West Coast Conference Player of the Year and All-American as a senior after winning the West Coast Conference Championship. She was a member of the 2019 Arnold Palmer Cup international team.

== Professional career ==
Naveed turned professional in 2019 and won the Long Beach Open on the Cactus Tour in her professional debut. In 2020, she joined the Epson Tour, where she recorded eight top-10 finishes before finishing 15th at LPGA Q-Series to earn LPGA Tour membership for the 2024 season.

As an LPGA Tour rookie, Naveed was solo runner-up at the 2024 Ford Championship in Arizona, two strokes behind Nelly Korda, who won her third consecutive LPGA tournament. With the finish, she rose to 106th in the Women's World Golf Rankings.

== Amateur wins ==
- 2015 Victorian Junior Masters, Dunes Medal
- 2018 Branch Law Firm-Dick McGuire Invitational, Stanford Intercollegiate
- 2019 West Coast Conference Championship

== Professional wins (1) ==
=== Cactus Tour (1) ===
- 2019 Long Beach Women's Open

== Results in LPGA majors ==
Tournament	2024	2025
Chevron Championship	CUT	CUT
U.S. Women's Open		
Women's PGA Championship	CUT	77
The Evian Championship	CUT	T65
Women's British Open	CUT	CUT

Did not play

CUT = missed the half-way cut
T = tied

== Team appearances ==
Amateur

- Australian Girls' Interstate Teams Matches (representing Western Australia): 2013, 2014, 2015
- Australian Women's Interstate Teams Matches (representing Western Australia): 2014, 2015
- Arnold Palmer Cup (representing the International team): 2019 (winners)
