= Yealimi Noh =

American professional golfer (born 2001)

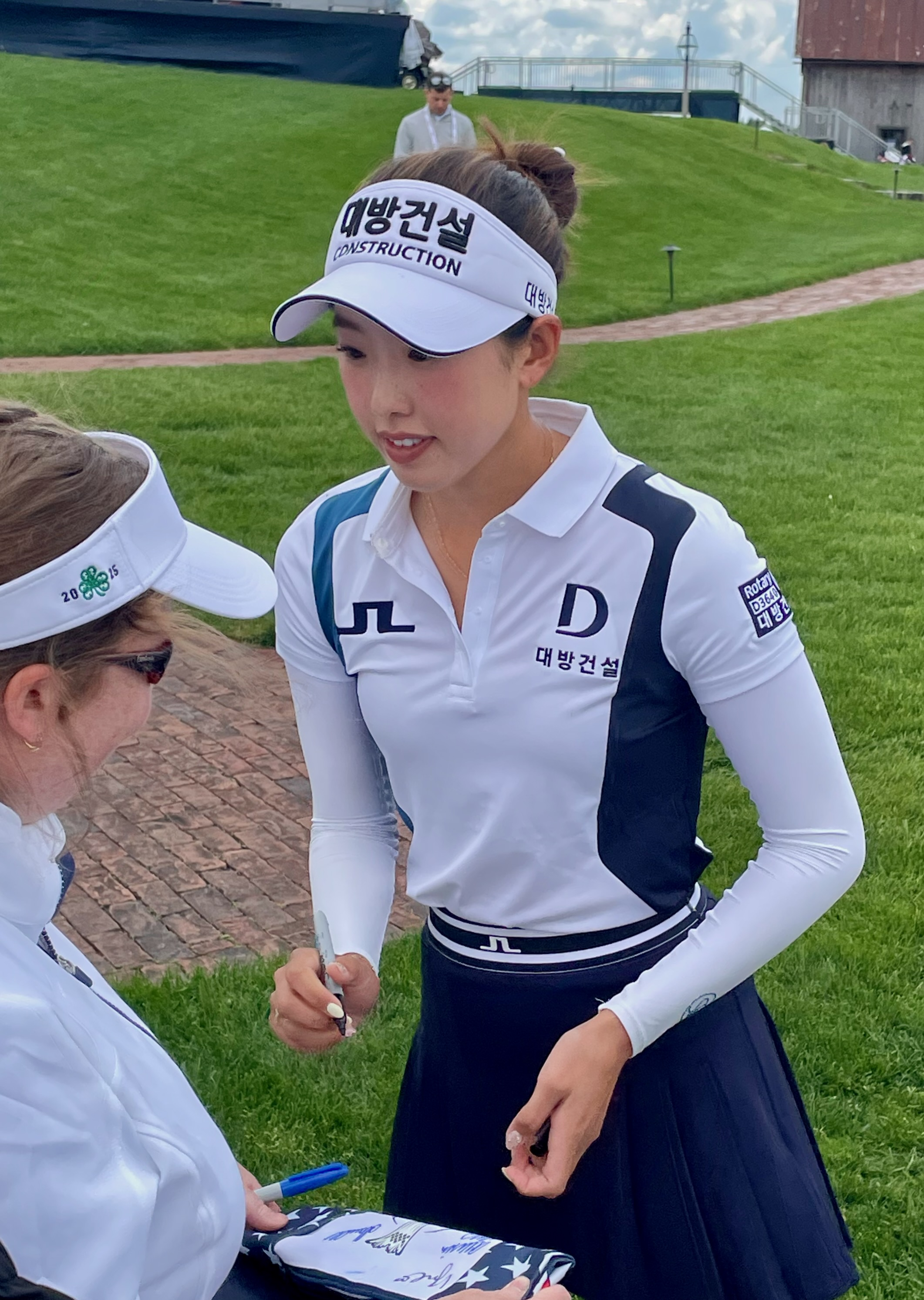
- Noh at 2025 U.S. Women's Open

Personal information
- Nationality: United States
- Born: July 26, 2001 (age 25) San Francisco, California, U.S.
- Height: 5 ft 9 in (175 cm)

Career
- Sport: Golf
- Turned professional: 2019
- Current tour: LPGA Tour (joined 2020)
- Professional wins: 1

Number of wins by tour
- LPGA Tour: 1

Best results in LPGA major championships
- Chevron Championship: T9: 2024
- Women's PGA C'ship: T12: 2025
- U.S. Women's Open: T14: 2025
- Women's British Open: 3rd: 2026
- Evian Championship: 3rd: 2021

Yealimi Noh (born July 26, 2001) is an American professional golfer, currently playing on the LPGA Tour. She turned pro in 2019 and qualified for the 2020 LPGA season after finishing 3rd in the qualifying school.

== Amateur career ==
Born in San Francisco in 2001, Noh was raised in Concord, California. Noh had an impressive run in 2018. Over the course of five weeks, she won four tournaments: the California Junior Championship, the Girl's Junior PGA Championship, the U.S. Girls' Junior, and the Canadian Women's Amateur, the last three in consecutive weeks.

== Professional career ==
Noh turned professional in early 2019. She Monday qualified for the 2019 Cambia Portland Classic and finished runner-up to Hannah Green. She finished third at the LPGA Q-Series to earn her tour card for 2020. Her best finish in 2020 was another runner-up at the Volunteers of America Classic.

Noh was selected as a captain's pick for Team USA for the 2021 Solheim Cup.

On February 9, 2025, Noh defeated former World No. 1, Ko Jin-young, by four strokes to secure her first victory at the Founders Cup at Bradenton Country Club.

== Amateur wins ==
- 2014 California Junior Championship
- 2015 Junior All-Star Invitational
- 2017 AJGA Girls Championship, Joanne Winter Arizona Silver Belle Championship, NCGA Girls Junior Championship
- 2018 Hana Financial Group Se Ri Pak Junior Championship, California Junior Championship, Girl's Junior PGA Championship, U.S. Girls' Junior, Canadian Women's Amateur

== Professional wins (1) ==
=== LPGA Tour wins (1) ===
Legend
Major championships (0)
Other LPGA Tour (1)

No.	Date	Tournament	Winning score	To par	Margin of victory	Runner-up	Winner's share ($)
1	Feb 9, 2025	Founders Cup	68-64-63-68=263	–21	4 strokes	(South Korea) Ko Jin-young	300,000

== Results in LPGA majors ==
Results not in chronological order.

Tournament	2019	2020	2021	2022	2023	2024	2025	2026
Chevron Championship		T44		CUT	CUT	T9	CUT	T12
U.S. Women's Open		T40	T64	T58		CUT	T14	T54
Women's PGA Championship		T33	T15	CUT	CUT	T52	T12	CUT
The Evian Championship	T44	NT	3	CUT		CUT	CUT	CUT
Women's British Open		T32	T13	CUT		CUT	CUT	3

Top 10
Did not play

CUT = missed the half-way cut
NT = no tournament
T = tied

=== Summary ===
Tournament	Wins	2nd	3rd	Top-5	Top-10	Top-25	Events	Cuts made
Chevron Championship	0	0	0	0	1	2	6	3
U.S. Women's Open	0	0	0	0	0	1	6	5
Women's PGA Championship	0	0	0	0	0	2	7	4
The Evian Championship	0	0	1	1	1	1	6	2
Women's British Open	0	0	1	1	1	2	6	3
Totals	0	0	2	2	3	8	31	17

- Most consecutive cuts made – 9 (2019 Evian – 2021 Evian)
- Longest streak of top-10s – 1 (three times, current)

== U.S. national team appearances ==
Amateur

- Junior Solheim Cup: 2017 (winners)
- Junior Ryder Cup: 2018 (winners)

Professional

- Solheim Cup: 2021, 2026
- International Crown: 2025

=== Solheim Cup record ===
Year	Total matches	Total W–L–H	Singles W–L–H	Foursomes W–L–H	Fourballs W–L–H	Points won	Points %
Career	6	3–2–1	1–1–0	0–0–0	2–1–1	3.5	58.3
2021	3	2–1–0	1–0–0 def. M. Reid 1up		1–1–0 lost w/ B. Altomare 1 dn won w/ M. Harigae 3&1	2.0	66.7
2026	3	1–1–1	0–1–0 lost to J. Ramírez 3&2		1–0–0 halved w/ A. Yin won w/ An. Lee 1 up	1.5	50.0
