= Bernardus Golf =

Golf club in the Netherlands

- Location in Netherlands
- 51.6652°N 5.2298°E

Club information
- Location: Cromvoirt, North Brabant, Netherlands
- Established: 2018
- Type: Public
- Total holes: 18
- Tournaments: Dutch Open (2021–23); Solheim Cup (2026)
- Website: bernardusgolf.com

18-hole Course
- Designed by: Kyle Phillips
- Par: 72
- Length: 6,790 metres (7,430 yd)

Bernardus Golf is an 18-hole championship golf course in Cromvoirt near Den Bosch in North Brabant, Netherlands. It has hosted the Dutch Open on the European Tour, and is the venue for the 2026 Solheim Cup on the Ladies European Tour.

== History ==
Robert van der Wallen, chairman of PSV Eindhoven, purchased the land in 2015 and presented the plans for the golf course in Cromvoirt. Development of the course started in early 2016. The clubhouse followed later that year and was designed by Patrick Russ and Pieter Laureys.

The 18-hole, 85-hectare heathland course was designed by American architect Kyle Phillips, who has also built courses such as Kingsbarns Golf Links in Scotland and Yas Links in Abu Dhabi. It opened in 2018.

== Tournaments ==
Between 2021 and 2023 the club hosted the Dutch Open, the Netherlands' national open golf tournament, sanctioned by the European Tour.

In 2022, it was selected to host the 2026 Solheim Cup.

| Year | Tour(s) | Championship | Winner |
|---|---|---|---|
| 2021 | EUR | Dutch Open | (Sweden) Kristoffer Broberg |
| 2022 | EUR | Dutch Open | (France) Victor Perez |
| 2023 | EUR | KLM Open | (Spain) Pablo Larrazábal |
| 2026 | LET; LPGA | Solheim Cup | Europe |
