= Auston Kim =

American professional golfer (born 2000)

Personal information
- Nationality: United States
- Born: August 16, 2000 (age 26) Long Island, New York, U.S.
- Height: 5 ft 8 in (1.73 m)

Career
- Sport: Golf
- College: Vanderbilt University
- Turned professional: 2022
- Current tour: LPGA Tour (joined 2024)
- Former tour: Epson Tour (joined 2022)

Best results in LPGA major championships
- Chevron Championship: T30: 2024
- Women's PGA C'ship: T2: 2025
- U.S. Women's Open: T31: 2025
- Women's British Open: T41: 2026
- Evian Championship: 9th: 2026

Auston Kim (김고은, born August 16, 2000) is an American professional golfer and LPGA Tour player. She won the 2023 Epson Tour Championship.

== Early life, family and college career ==
Kim was born in Long Island, New York to mother, Piljo, and father, Christopher. She and her family moved to St. Augustine, Florida, in 2011. She attended Allen D. Nease High School and graduated in 2017.

She has an older sister, August, who was a First Team All-American at Purdue University and also played professionally for 5 years on the Symetra and LPGA Tours, and now attends Vanderbilt University School of Medicine.

Kim attended Vanderbilt University and played with the Vanderbilt Commodores women's golf team between 2018 and 2022, where she was on the SEC All-Freshman Team, honorable mention All-American, and named to the Annika Award Watch List. She graduated in 2022 with a degree in political science and a concentration in American government.

== Professional career ==
Kim turned professional in 2022 and joined the Epson Tour. In 2023, she recorded ten top-10s including a runner-up at the Island Resort Championship and a win at the Epson Tour Championship. She finished 3rd in the rankings to earn a tour card for the 2024 LPGA season.

In her rookie LPGA Tour season, Kim shot a 64 in the third round of her first tournament, the LPGA Drive On Championship, and finished tied 6th. She recorded a solo 3rd at the Lotte Championship in Hawaii, and finished 6th in the Rookie of the Year race and 66th on the money list, to comfortably keep her status for 2025.

== Amateur wins ==
- 2019 NCAA Auburn Regional, Cougar Classic

== Professional wins (1) ==
=== Epson Tour wins (1) ===
No.	Date	Tournament	Winning score	To par	Margin of victory	Runners-up
1	Oct 8, 2023	Epson Tour Championship	71-64-65-65=265	−23	1 stroke	(United States) Gurleen Kaur, (United States) Kaleigh Telfer

== Results in LPGA majors ==
Results not in chronological order.

Tournament	2019	2020	2021	2022	2023	2024	2025	2026
Chevron Championship						T30	T44	T59
U.S. Women's Open	CUT	CUT		CUT			T31	CUT
Women's PGA Championship						CUT	T2	T5
The Evian Championship		NT				CUT	T43	9
Women's British Open						T78	CUT	T41

Top 10
Did not play

CUT = missed the half-way cut
NT = no tournament
T = tied

== U.S. national team appearances ==
Professional

- Solheim Cup: 2026
