= Leona Maguire =

Irish professional golfer (born 1994)

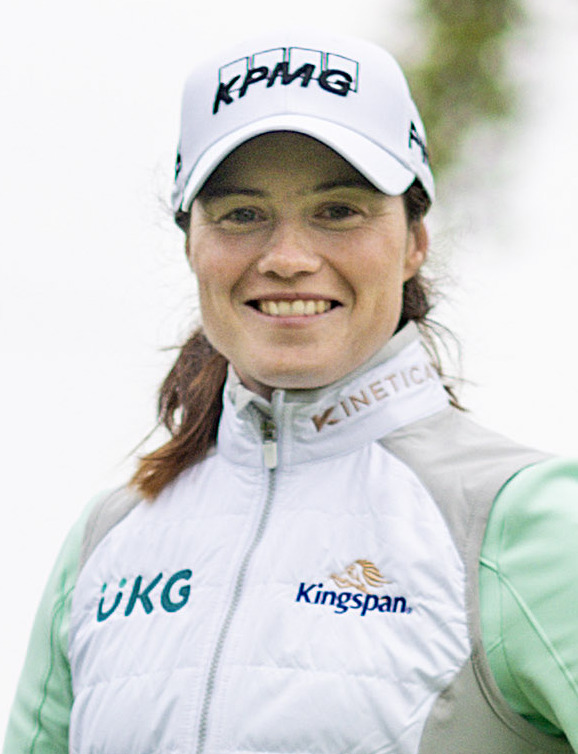
- Maguire in 2023

Personal information
- Nationality: Ireland
- Born: 30 November 1994 (age 31) County Cavan, Ireland
- Height: 5 ft 6 in (168 cm)

Career
- Sport: Golf
- College: Duke University
- Turned professional: 2018
- Current tours: Ladies European Tour; LPGA Tour
- Former tour: Symetra Tour
- Professional wins: 5

Number of wins by tour
- LPGA Tour: 2
- Ladies European Tour: 1
- Epson Tour: 2

Best results in LPGA major championships
- Chevron Championship: T18: 2020
- Women's PGA C'ship: T11: 2023
- U.S. Women's Open: T8: 2022
- Women's British Open: T4: 2022
- Evian Championship: T6: 2021

Achievements and awards
- Mark H. McCormack Medal: 2015, 2016, 2017

Leona Maguire (born 30 November 1994) is an Irish professional golfer. She held the record for the most weeks at the top of the World Amateur Golf Ranking. She was the first Irish woman to win on the LPGA Tour and the first Irish woman to win on the Ladies European Tour.

== Early life ==
Maguire is a native of County Cavan. At the age of 9, she gave up a promising swimming career to concentrate on golf. She is 15 minutes younger than her twin sister, Lisa Maguire, who was also a professional golfer and retired in 2019.

On 10 September 2005, she won the 10th HSBC British Wee Wonders Championship by 11 shots at the Balgove Course, St Andrews, Scotland, with a finishing round of 61. Two months later she finished runner-up to her sister Lisa in the Young Masters Golf Junior Series at La Manga in Spain.

== Amateur career ==
=== 2007–2014 ===
Playing in the Northern Ireland Ladies Open at Hilton Templepatrick Hotel & Country Club in June 2007 at the age of 12, Maguire broke the record as the youngest golfer to participate in a Ladies European Tour event.

In May 2008, she won the Lancome Irish Women's Amateur Close Championship at Westport, County Mayo.

Maguire won the Portuguese International Ladies Amateur Championship in January 2011 by 15 strokes. Later that same year, Maguire won the Irish Women's Open Stroke Play Championship.

In April 2012, Maguire became the first Irish golfer to win the Irish Girls Open Strokeplay Championship. Two months later, she was part of the Great Britain & Ireland Curtis Cup team which defeated the US at Nairn, Scotland. Shortly afterwards she won the Irish Women's Amateur Close Championship for the second time in her career.

Maguire left secondary school at Loreto College, Cavan, in Ireland with top scholastic honours and joined Duke University in Durham, North Carolina, U.S.

=== 2015 ===
Maguire reached first place in the World Amateur Golf Ranking on 13 May 2015 after winning three times in the United States. She helped Duke win the NCAA South Bend Regional title and was voted the ACC Player of the Year and ACC Freshman of the Year.

Maguire was a selection for the 2015 ACC All-Star team and she won the 2015 Annika Award for the best golfer of the year in American college women's golf and was chosen as a member of the South Bend Region All-Star team as well as was honoured both as the Women's Golf Coaches' Association (WGCA) Player of the Year and Freshman of the Year for 2015 and was included in the 2015 WGCA All-American team. She was also the recipient of the 2014–15 Golfstat Cup presented to the player who has the best scoring average.

On 25 June, Maguire was named on the 2015 All-ACC Academic Team which recognises academic as well as athletic excellence. The same month, she won the Golfweek National Player of the Year award and was selected to Golfweek's All-America First Team. On 6 July Maguire was named on the WGCA 2015 All-American Scholar Team.

Maguire was undefeated representing Great Britain & Ireland in the 2015 Vagliano Trophy against Europe, held at Malone Golf Club, Belfast, Northern Ireland.

At the 2015 European Ladies Tour's ISPS Handa Ladies European Masters at Buckinghamshire Golf Club, Denham, England, Maguire finished second, but as an amateur she did not receive the prize money of €50,000.

Maguire was also invited to play in the final major of 2015, The Evian Championship in France and finished as leading amateur. Again as an amateur Maguire did not receive the prize money of €18,648 but advanced in to the top 300 of the Women's World Golf Rankings. In September Maguire was awarded the European Ladies' Amateur Golf Ranking's gold medal. In December she won the Irish Women's Amateur Golfer of The Year award for the third time.

=== 2016 ===
In June, Maguire was selected on the All-ACC Academic Team, and the 2015-16 WGCA All-American Scholars Team which recognises academic excellence as well as athletic excellence, each for the second year in a row.

At the 2016 Ricoh Women's British Open at the Woburn Golf and Country Club, England, Maguire finished as leading amateur. She regained her world number one amateur ranking on 3 August 2016. The same month she represented Ireland at the 2016 Rio Olympics Women's Golf, and finished in a tie for 21st.

In September, Maguire helped Ireland to a bronze medal in the 2016 Espirito Santo Trophy held at Mayakoka El Camaleon Golf Club in Mexico. In November, she helped Duke win the East Lake Cup held in Atlanta, Georgia.

With the intention to turn professional Maguire entered the LPGA Tour qualifying school in October. After successfully completing stage II, Maguire withdrew prior to stage III and stated she would return to Duke.

=== 2017 ===
In April, Maguire won the ACC Championship for the second time, and was selected as ACC Golfer of the Month for the sixth time. In May, Maguire was voted the ACC Women's Golfer of the Year for the second time, and was selected for the All-ACC Women's Golf Team for the third year in a row. Maguire was selected for the College Sports Information Directors of America Academic All-District III Women's At-Large Team, which recognises the nation's top student-athletes for their combined performances athletically and in the classroom. Maguire was also named the USA Women's Golf Coaches Association (WGCA) National Player of the Year for the second time. She was also selected for the WGCA First Team All-Americans.

Maguire was, for the second time in her career, awarded the 2016-17 GolfStat Cup for the best scoring average. Maguire finished in first place on the Golfweek/Sagarin women's college end of season rankings. On 8 June, She won the Annika Award, and became the first person to win it twice. On 17 June, Maguire won the British Ladies Amateur Golf Championship, beating Ainhoa Olarra of Spain 3 & 2 in the final at the Pyle & Kenfig Golf Club, Waun-y-Mer, Wales.

On 25 June, Maguire was named the ACC Women's Golf Scholar-Athlete of the Year, and was selected to the All-ACC Academic Team for the third year in a row. On 28 June, Maguire won the Golfweek National Player of the Year award for the second time, and was selected to Golfweek First Team All-America for the third straight season. Maguire was selected for the Women's Golf Coaches Association (WGCA) All-American Scholars Team for the third year in a row. On 10 July, she was awarded the 2017 Edith Cummings Munson Golf Award by the Women's Golf Coaches Association (WGCA).

On 12 September, Maguire began the 2017-2018 College Golf season by winning the Jim West Challenge, including the lowest round of her career, a 63. Her 54-hole 13-under par total of 200 broke the tournament all-time record. She helped Duke win the team title as well as setting a new school team scoring record of 33-under par. This was her fifth title of 2017. On 22 October, Maguire qualified to play in the professional Symetra Tour in 2018 by finishing in ninth place at the LPGA Qualifying Tournament Stage II. On 9 November, Maguire was selected as ACC Golfer of the Month for November 2017, which is the eighth time she has won the monthly award. On 27 November Maguire was named 2017 Global Golf Post Female Amateur of the Year. She was chosen as a member of the Global Golf Post All-Star amateur team of 2017 for the third year in a row.

=== 2018 ===
On 31 January, Maguire broke Lydia Ko's record for the most weeks at the top of the World Amateur rankings, with 131 weeks.

Maguire claimed her third win of the 2017–18 college season by winning the ACC Championship for the third time. On 23 April, she was presented with the Duke University Lifetime Achievement Award. She was also voted the Atlantic Coast Conference Women's Golfer of the Year for the third time and was chosen for the All-ACC Team for the fourth time in her career. On 10 May, Maguire was inducted into Phi Beta Kappa, America's oldest academic honor society.

On 11 May, Maguire was awarded the ACC Plaque for Excellence, Scholarship and Athletics. Maguire's final 70.97 college career scoring average was the best in NCAA history for any female golfer with at least 100 rounds. On 22 May, Maguire was selected for the USA Women's Golf Coaches Association (WGCA) All-Americans First Team. On 9 June, Maguire was selected to Golfweek First Team All-America for the fourth season in a row. On 20 June, Maguire was named the ACC Women's Golf Scholar-Athlete of the Year for the second time and was also named to the All-ACC Academic Team for the fourth year in a row. In July, Maguire was selected for the 2017-18 WGCA All-American Scholars Team, and the annual ACC Honor Roll for the fourth year in a row. Maguire was awarded the 2018 Edith Cummings Munson Golf Award by the Women's Golf Coaches Association (WGCA) for the second time. Amateurgolf.com selected her as the second best female amateur golfer of the last ten years. Golfweek selected Maguire as the best women's college golfer of the last decade.

== Professional career ==
=== 2018 ===
Maguire turned professional on 5 June 2018. Both she and her twin sister Lisa Maguire signed to singer Niall Horan's golf management company Modest! Golf and also signed sponsorship deals with Puma, Ping, Allianz and KPMG. She based herself in Scottsdale, Arizona. The week she turned professional, Maguire made her professional debut on the LPGA Tour at the ShopRite LPGA Classic, where she finished in 15th place. The following week, she made her debut on the Symetra Tour at the Decatur-Forsyth Classic, where she recorded the first hole-in-one of her professional career. In December, she secured Category 5c exemption status for the 2019 Ladies European Tour by finishing fifth in the Qualifying Finals Lalla Aicha Tour School in Morocco.

=== 2019–2020 ===
In April 2019, Maguire won her first professional tournament at the Windsor Golf Classic on the Symetra Tour in Windsor, California, after a playoff against Pajaree Anannarukarn. The next month, Maguire broke the course record at the LET Omega Dubai Moonlight Classic on the Faldo Course at Emirates Golf Club in Dubai with a round of 64. The same month she won the Symetra Classic by a five-stroke margin. She qualified for the 2019 U.S. Women's Open through qualifying tournament, but missed the cut in the champiopnship in July. In October 2019, Maguire secured her LPGA Tour card for the 2020 season by finishing seventh on the on the Symetra Tour money list.

Maguire was ranked 100 on the LPGA Priority List for the 2020 season. In February, she achieved her first top five finish as an LPGA professional with a fourth place in the ISPS Handa Vic Open..On 13 September, Maguire recorded her highest placing in a professional golf major with 18th place in the ANA Inspiration at Rancho Mirage, California. Maguire ended the year ranked number one on the LPGA Putting Average statistics list with an average of 28.69 putts per round. She also secured her tour card for 2021.

=== 2021 ===
On 17 April, Maguire achieved her highest placing in a LPGA Tour event and also the highest ever by any Irish female golfer, with joint second at the Lotte Championship, held in Hawaii. Her score of 267 was the lowest tournament total in her professional career. As a result, she broke into the top 100 on the Women's World Golf Rankings for the first time. On 20 June, Maguire had the biggest payday of her career at the Meijer LPGA Classic. She finished second to Nelly Korda and earned $214,000. Maguire's second round score of 64 was the lowest in her LPGA career. This was her fourth top-10 finish of the season. On 27 June, Maguire placed 15th in the KPMG Women's PGA Championship, held at the Atlanta Athletic Club, Georgia. The result pushed her world golf ranking up to 60th place. On 25 July, Maguire shot the lowest ever final round score, by any golfer male or female, in the history of the 756 major grand slam tournaments held so far with a 61 in the last round of The Evian Championship. It was also the joint lowest of any round in the history of all golf's major grand slam tournaments. The other two joint record holders are Lee Jeong-eun and Kim Hyo-joo. This helped her to finish tied-6th, her first ever top-10 result in a major. It was also the highest placing in a professional golf major by a professional female golfer from the Republic of Ireland. On 7 August, Maguire participated in her second Olympic Games at the Kasumigaseki Country Club in Japan. She finished 23rd.. On 15 August, she finished 15th in the Trust Golf Women's Scottish Open. She passed the $1 million mark in career earnings. On 22 August, she achieved her seventh consecutive top 15 place at an LPGA Tour event by finishing 13th in the 2021 Women's British Open at Carnoustie Golf Links, Scotland. None of her last 29 rounds of golf had been over par. The following day, she was selected to represent Team Europe at the 2021 Solheim Cup. She was the first ever Irish representative to be selected. On 6 September 2021, Maguire broke the all-time rookie points record in either the Solheim Cup or the Ryder Cup with a total of 4.5 points (2 points better than anybody else in the 2021 Solheim Cup), which helped Europe to win the cup 15–13. On 11 November, Maguire broke both the tournament and course records at the Pelican Women's Championship in Belleair, Florida, with a score of 62, the second lowest round of her professional career. Maguire finished the year as runner-up in the LPGA Rookie of the Year and 19th on the LPGA Money List with earnings of $885,141. On 20 December, Maguire was named as the Irish Golf Writers’ Association Professional Player of the Year, only the second woman to be so honoured in the history of the award. In the end of year final Women's World Golf Rankings, Maguire achieved her highest ever position of 40th place, making her the 5th-best ranked European.

=== 2022 ===
On 5 February, Maguire became the first golfer from Ireland to win an LPGA tournament. At the LPGA Drive On Championship held in Fort Myers, Florida, she gained a three-stroke victory over Lexi Thompson. She won $225,000, her biggest-ever prize money. On 21 February, Maguire moved up to number 18 on the world rankings. In June 2022, Maguire achieved her highest ever placing in the U.S. Women's Open with eighth place at Pine Needles Lodge and Golf Club in Southern Pines, North Carolina. Later the same month, Maguire shot a final round 65 to force a playoff with Jennifer Kupcho and Nelly Korda at the Meijer LPGA Classic; Kupcho won the title at the second sudden-death hole. On 7 August 2022, Maguire achieved her highest place in a major, with joint fourth place in the AIG Women's Open at Muirfield, Scotland. Maguire finished the LPGA season winning her biggest ever prize money at the CME Group Tour Championship in Tiburon Golf Club, Naples, Florida, USA. Her second place to Lydia Ko earned her $550,000. Maguire moved to a career high 11th on the world rankings and was the highest-ranked European player. She also finished in the top-10 on the LPGA rankings for most money won, most tournaments won and for most top-10 finishes. Maguire finished her 2022 season with a fourth-place finish at Open De España on the LET. Maguire had ten top-10 finishes worldwide in 2022.

=== 2023–2024 ===
On 18 June 2023, Maguire achieved her second victory on the LPGA Tour, by winning the Meijer LPGA Classic. The following week, she held the overnight lead after both the second and third rounds of the 2023 Women's PGA Championship. The result was enough to elevate her to a career high of 10th in the world rankings, becoming the first Irish woman to break into the top-ten. Maguire passed the $4 million mark for career earnings on the LPGA Tour. and her total on-course earnings for 2023 was $1.37 million. Maguire had eight top-10 finishes worldwide in 2023.

On 7 April 2024, Maguire reached the final of the T-Mobile Match Play at Shadow Creek Golf Course, Las Vegas where she lost, 4 and 3, to Nelly Korda. On 5 July, she became the first Irish woman to win on the Ladies European Tour. She won the Aramco Team Series event in Centurion Club, Hemel Hempstead, England, leading through all three rounds.

=== 2025–2026 ===
In the 2025 season, Maguire passed the $5 million mark for career earnings on the LPGA Tour. In the 2026 season, Maguire passed the $6 million mark for career earnings on the LPGA Tour.

During the 2026 Solheim Cup, Maguire broke the all-time record for the fastest player to reach 10 wins in the competition's history, doing so in her 14th match. Her 100% career win record in the singles ended, following a defeat by Lauren Coughlin, but Europe regained the trophy from the United States.

== Awards, honors ==
In 2008 she won the Irish Women's Amateur Golfer of The Year award, the youngest ever winner aged just 14. She won the award again In 2011, 2015, 2016 and 2017, equalling the all-time record, with five wins, held by Claire Hourihane.

She won the 2015 Annika Award for the best golfer of the year in American college women's golf.

In 2015, Maguire was awarded the Mark H. McCormack Medal given annually to the number-one-ranked female amateur player in the world. She repeated that feat in 2016 and 2017.

In 2015, she was the winner of Golfweek's National Player of the Year.

In 2015 and 2016 Maguire was awarded the European Ladies' Amateur Golf Ranking's gold medal.

On 23 May 2017, Maguire was named the USA Women's Golf Coaches Association (WGCA) National Player of the Year for the second time in three years and became just the fifth player in history to win the award multiple times.

In 2021 and 2023 Maguire won the Irish Women's Professional Golfer of The Year award.

On 9 December 2024 she was inducted into the Women's Golf Coaches Association (WGCA) Players Hall of Fame, the first Irish golfer to be so honored.

On 19 December 2024, she was conferred with an honorary doctorate in science by the Ulster University, Belfast, Northern Ireland.

== Amateur wins ==
- 2008 Irish Women's Amateur Close Championship
- 2009 French International Lady Juniors Amateur Championship, Scottish Women's Open Amateur Strokeplay Championship, Irish Women's Open Stroke Play Championship
- 2010 French International Lady Juniors Amateur Championship
- 2011 Portuguese International Ladies Amateur Championship, British Ladies' Open Stroke Play Championship, Irish Women's Open Stroke Play Championship,
- 2012 Irish Girls Open Strokeplay Championship
- 2013 Hermitage Scratch Cup
- 2015 Darius Rucker Intercollegiate (Hilton Head, South Carolina), Atlantic Coast Conference (ACC) Championship (Greensboro, North Carolina), NCAA South Regional
- 2017 ACC Championship, British Ladies Amateur Golf Championship, Jim West Challenge, Northrop Grumman Regional Challenge, LSU Tiger Golf Classic, Ruth's Chris Tar Heel Invite
- 2018 ACC Championship

== Professional wins (5) ==
=== LPGA Tour (2) ===
No.	Date	Tournam)ent	Winning score	To par	Margin of victory	Runner-up
1	5 Feb 2022	LPGA Drive On Championship	66-65-67=198	−18	3 strokes	(United States) Lexi Thompson
2	18 Jun 2023	Meijer LPGA Classic	69-65-69-64=267	−21	2 strokes	(Thailand) Ariya Jutanugarn

LPGA Tour playoff record (0–1)

No.	Year	Tournament	Opponents	Result
1	2022	Meijer LPGA Classic	(United States) Jennifer Kupcho (United States) Nelly Korda	Kupcho won with a birdie on the second extra hole Korda eliminated by birdie on first hole

=== Ladies European Tour wins (1) ===
No.	Date	Tournament	Winning score	To par	Margin of victory	Runner-up
1	5 Jul 2024	Aramco Team Series – London	66-72-73=211	–8	1 stroke	(Spain) María Hernández

=== Symetra Tour wins (2) ===
No.	Date	Tournament	Winning score	To par	Margin of victory	Runner-up
1	7 Apr 2019	Windsor Golf Classic	70-69-65=204	−12	Playoff	(Thailand) Pajaree Anannarukarn
2	17 May 2019	Symetra Classic	70-69-67=206	−10	5 strokes	(United States) Brittany Benvenuto

== Results in LPGA majors ==
Results not in chronological order.

Tournament	2012	2013	2014	2015	2016	2017	2018	2019	2020	2021	2022	2023	2024	2025	2026
Chevron Championship					CUT				T18	T28	T39	T23	CUT	T67	CUT
U.S. Women's Open					CUT	CUT		CUT			T8	T31	CUT	CUT	CUT
Women's PGA Championship								CUT	T65	T15	T54	T11	T24	T19	T53
The Evian Championship				T34LA					NT	T6	T65	T42	CUT	T7	CUT
Women's British Open	CUT				T25LA	T49			CUT	T13	T4	T30	T37	T63	CUT

Top 10
Did not play

LA = low amateur
CUT = missed the half-way cut
NT = no tournament
"T" = tied

=== Summary ===
Tournament	Wins	2nd	3rd	Top-5	Top-10	Top-25	Events	Cuts made
Chevron Championship	0	0	0	0	0	2	8	5
U.S. Women's Open	0	0	0	0	1	1	8	2
Women's PGA Championship	0	0	0	0	0	4	8	7
The Evian Championship	0	0	0	0	2	2	7	5
Women's British Open	0	0	0	1	1	3	10	7
Totals	0	0	0	1	4	12	41	26

- Most consecutive cuts made – 16 (2020 ANA – 2023 Women's British)
- Longest streak of top-10s – 1 (four times)

== LPGA Tour career summary ==
Year	Tournaments played	Cuts made*	Wins	2nd	3rd	Top 10s	Best finish	Earnings ($)	Money list rank	Scoring average	Scoring rank
2012	1	0	0	0	0	0	CUT	n/a	n/a	78.50	n/a
2015	1	1	0	0	0	0	T34	n/a	n/a	71.50	n/a
2016	3	1	0	0	0	0	T25	n/a	n/a	73.00	n/a
2017	3	1	0	0	0	0	T49	n/a	n/a	72.50	n/a
2018	1	1	0	0	0	0	T15	n/a	n/a	68.33	n/a
2019	4	0	0	0	0	0	CUT	n/a	n/a	74.00	n/a
2020	14	11	0	0	0	1	T4	180,387	65	71.75	50
2021	20	17	0	2	0	5	2	885,141	19	69.99	13
2022	24	18	1	2	0	8	1	1,812,831	9	70.45	25
2023	20	19	1	0	1	6	1	1,195,726 (Note: Also earned $92,500 in unofficial money at the co-sanctioned Grant Thornton Invitational on 14 December 2023)	22	70.45	22
2024	24	19	0	1	0	1	2	619,700	63	71.43	61
2025	26	20	0	0	0	2	T7	742,854 (Note: Also earned $67,078 in unofficial money at the rained-off Walmart NW Arkansas Championship on 21 September 2025)	51	71.57	76
2026	26	13	0	1	0	3	T2	607,831	61	71.85	95
Totals^	154 (2020)	117 (2020)	2	6	1	26	1	6,044,475 (Note: Also received a stipend for missing the cut in tournaments, e.g. $10,000 for the 2026 Chevron major)	81		

^ Official as of 2026 season
* Includes matchplay and other tournaments without a cut.

== Ladies European Tour career summary ==
Prize money (as of 31 August 2026) €1,642,709. (Note: €1,306,554 of this was won in LPGA co-sanctioned events so it duplicates her LPGA Tour total career earnings above. Her solo LET earnings were €294,045)

== LPGA Epson/Symetra Tour career summary ==
Prize money (to end of 2022 season) $120,760

== World ranking ==
Position in Women's World Golf Rankings at the end of each calendar year.

Year	Ranking	Source
2012	686	
2015	284	
2016	301	
2017	460	
2018	383	
2019	254	
2020	177	
2021	40	
2022	11	
2023	25	
2024	52	
2025	103	

== Team appearances ==
Amateur

- European Girls' Team Championship (representing Ireland): 2008, 2009 (winners), 2010, 2012
- Junior Ryder Cup (representing Europe): 2008
- Junior Solheim Cup (representing Europe): 2009, 2011
- Vagliano Trophy (representing Great Britain & Ireland): 2009, 2011, 2015, 2017
- Curtis Cup (representing Great Britain & Ireland): 2010, 2012 (winners), 2016 (winners)
- Espirito Santo Trophy (representing Ireland): 2010, 2012, 2016
- European Ladies' Team Championship (representing Ireland): 2011, 2013, 2015

Professional

- Solheim Cup (representing Europe): 2021 (winners), 2023 (tie, cup retained), 2024, 2026 (winners)

=== Solheim Cup record ===
Year	Total matches	Total W–L–H	Singles W–L–H	Foursomes W–L–H	Fourballs W–L–H	Points won	Points %
Career	16	10–5–1	3–1–0	4–2–0	3–2–1	10.5	65.63%
2021	5	4–0–1	1–0–0 def. J. Kupcho 5&4	2–0–0 won w/ M. Reid 1 up won w/ M. Reid 5&4	1–0–1 won w/ G. Hall 1 up halved w/ M. Reid	4.5	90.00%
2023	5	3–2–0	1–0–0 def. R. Zhang 4&3	0–2–0 lost w/ A. Nordqvist 1 dn lost w/ A. Nordqvist 1 dn	2–0–0 won w/ G. Hall 1 up won w/ C. Hull 4&3	3	60.00%
2024	2	1–1–0	1–0–0 def. A. Ewing 4&3	0–0–0	0–1–0 lost w/ G. Hall 6&4	1	50.00%
2026	4	2–2–0	0–1–0 lost to L. Coughlin 2&1	2–0–0 won w/ E. Henseleit 2 up won w/ E. Henseleit 1 up	0–1–0 lost w/ N. Nadaud 3&2	2	50.00%
