= Jessica Korda =

American professional golfer (born 1993)

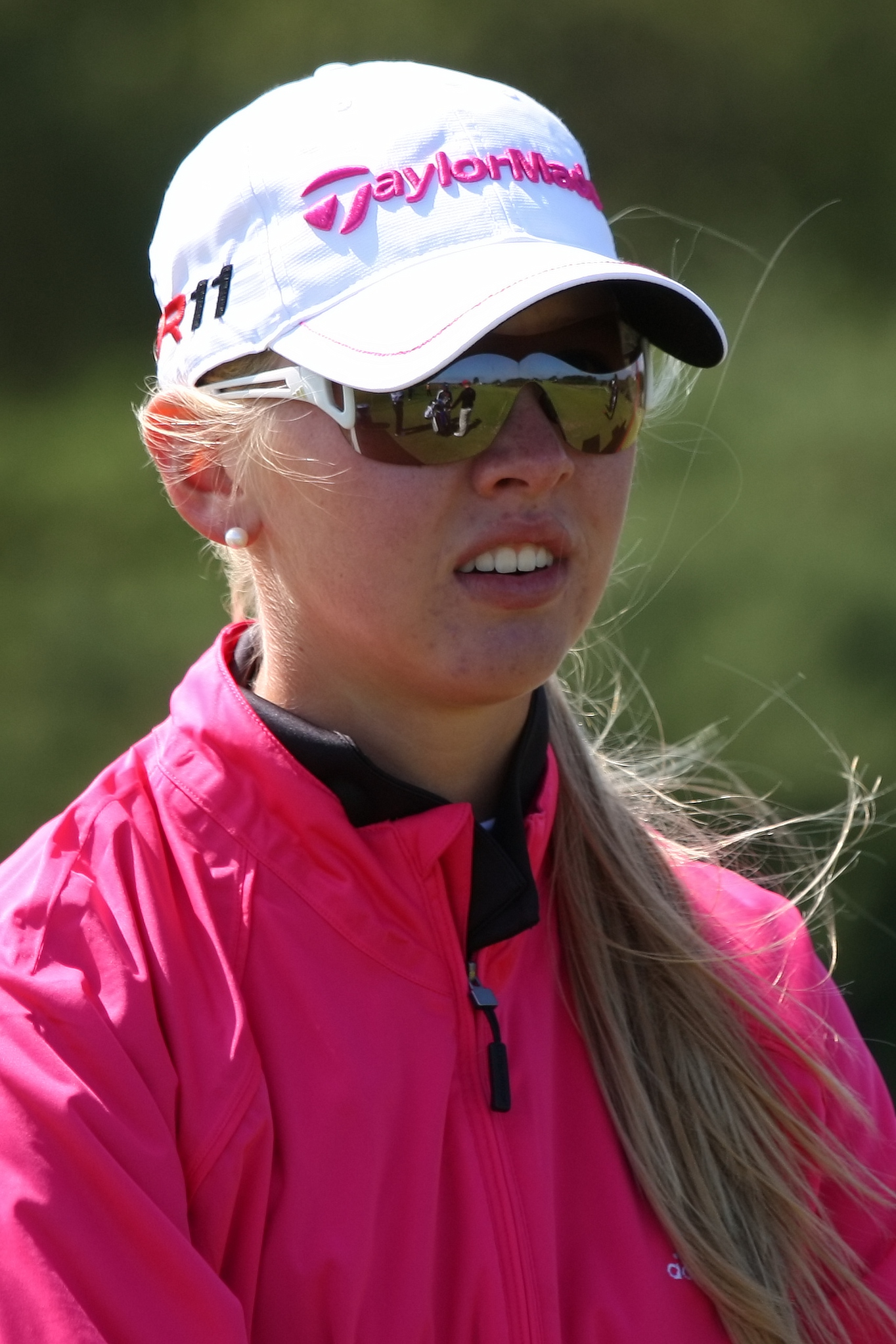
- Korda at the 2011 Women's British Open

Personal information
- Full name: Jessica Regina Korda
- Nationality: United States; Czech Republic
- Born: February 27, 1993 (age 33) Bradenton, Florida, U.S.
- Height: 5 ft 11 in (180 cm)
- Spouse: Johnny DelPrete
- Children: 1

Career
- Sport: Golf
- Turned professional: 2010
- Former tour: LPGA Tour (2011–2023)
- Professional wins: 6

Number of wins by tour
- LPGA Tour: 6

Best results in LPGA major championships
- Chevron Championship: 2nd: 2022
- Women's PGA C'ship: T4: 2018
- U.S. Women's Open: T7: 2013
- Women's British Open: T5: 2014
- Evian Championship: T8: 2018

Jessica Regina Korda (Czech: Kordová, born February 27, 1993) is a Czech-American professional golfer who plays on the LPGA Tour.

== Amateur career ==
Korda was a member of the 2009 U.S. Junior Solheim Cup and the 2010 U.S. Curtis Cup teams. As an amateur, she won the 2010 South Atlantic Amateur and made the cut at the 2008 and 2009 U.S. Women's Opens. Korda finished T19 in her U.S. Open debut in 2008 where she shot the only round in the 60s on Sunday, shooting a 69. She finished runner-up at the 2010 U.S. Women's Amateur.

She represented the Czech Republic in the World Amateur Team Championship Espirito Santo Trophy in 2006, and represented the United States in 2010, finishing tied for 4th individually and silver medalist with her team.

Korda entered LPGA Tour Qualifying School in the fall of 2010 as a 17-year-old. She finished runner-up in the final Qualifying Tournament, making her eligible for full membership on the Tour in 2011.

== Professional career ==
Korda turned 18 during the second event of the 2011 season. She played in 15 events in her rookie year; her best finish was a tie for 19th at the Avnet LPGA Classic. Her first professional win was in the first event of the 2012 season, the Women's Australian Open at Royal Melbourne. After rounds of 72-70-73-74, her victory came on the second hole of a six-person playoff.

Korda won her second LPGA Tour title at the season opening Pure Silk-Bahamas LPGA Classic in January 2014, finishing one shot ahead of Stacy Lewis.

Korda represented United States at the Solheim Cup in 2013, 2019, and 2021. She also qualified for the U.S. team in 2017, after finishing fifth in points, but did not play after withdrawing with a forearm injury and was replaced by Paula Creamer.

=== 2023 ===
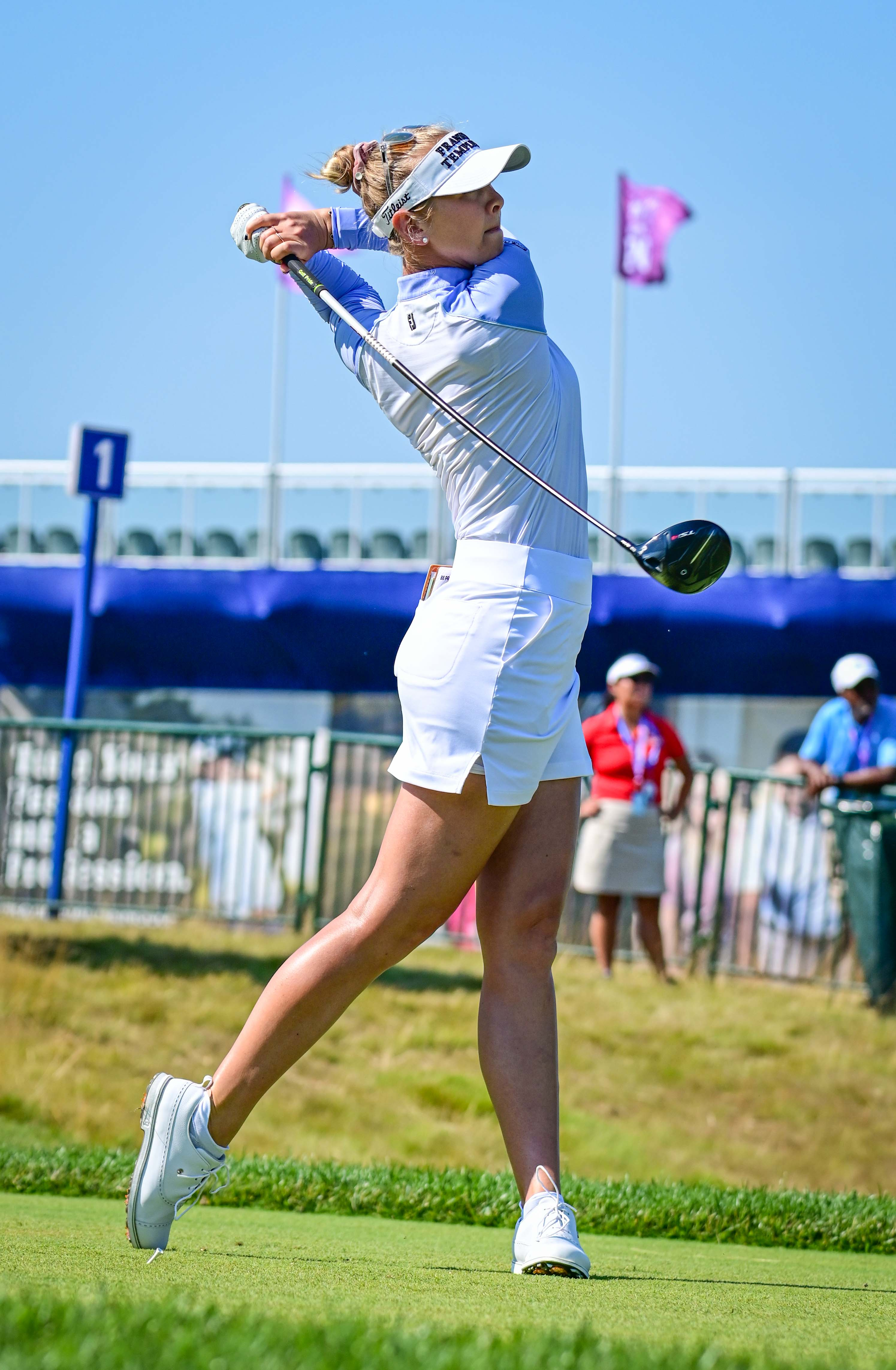
Korda at the 2022 Women's PGA Championship.

On May 28, she announced that she would stop playing indefinitely to rehab her back injury which had been a concern at the start of the season. Her sister Nelly Korda announced that she would miss the inaugural Mizuho Americas Open event at Liberty National Golf Club on June 1 because of her back pain.

== Personal life ==
Korda is the daughter of retired professional tennis players Petr Korda and Regina Rajchrtová. Her father is a Grand Slam champion, winning the 1998 Australian Open crown. Her younger brother, Sebastian, won the 2018 Australian Open title in the boys' junior division.

Korda's personal and professional lives intersected at the 2013 U.S. Women's Open. During the third round of that event, she and caddy Jason Gilroyed had several disagreements, and she fired him after shooting 5-over-par for the first nine holes. She then called for her boyfriend, professional golfer Johnny DelPrete, to come in from the gallery and serve as her caddy for the rest of the round. Korda shot 1-under for the second nine, and she kept DelPrete on her bag for the final round.

Her younger sister, Nelly Korda, joined her on the 2017 LPGA Tour after earning her card via the Symetra Tour and advanced to world number one in the Women's World Golf Rankings in 2021.

She married her longtime boyfriend Johnny DelPrete on December 11, 2021. In August 2023, the couple announced that she was pregnant with their first child, due in February 2024. Korda gave birth on February 3.

== Professional wins (6) ==
=== LPGA Tour wins (6) ===
No.	Date	Tournament	Winning score	To par	Margin of victory	Runner(s)-up	Winner's share ($)
1	Feb 12, 2012	Women's Australian Open	72-70-73-74=289	−3	Playoff	(Paraguay) Julieta Granada (United States) Stacy Lewis (United States) Brittany Lincicome (South Korea) So Yeon Ryu (South Korea) Hee Kyung Seo	165,000
2	Jan 26, 2014	Pure Silk-Bahamas LPGA Classic	69-66-72-66=273	−19	1 stroke	(United States) Stacy Lewis	195,000
3	May 25, 2014	Airbus LPGA Classic	67-67-69-65=268	−20	1 stroke	(Sweden) Anna Nordqvist	195,000
4	Oct 11, 2015	Sime Darby LPGA Malaysia	69-67-65-65=266	−18	4 strokes	(China) Shanshan Feng (New Zealand) Lydia Ko (United States) Stacy Lewis	300,000
5	Feb 25, 2018	Honda LPGA Thailand	66-62-68-67=263	−25	4 strokes	(Thailand) Moriya Jutanugarn (United States) Lexi Thompson	240,000
6	Jan 24, 2021	Diamond Resorts Tournament of Champions	65-69-60-66=260	−24	Playoff	(United States) Danielle Kang	180,000

LPGA Tour playoff record (2–0)

No.	Year	Tournament	Opponent(s)	Result
1	2012	Women's Australian Open	(Paraguay) Julieta Granada (United States) Stacy Lewis (United States) Brittany Lincicome (South Korea) So Yeon Ryu (South Korea) Hee Kyung Seo	Won with birdie on second extra hole
2	2021	Diamond Resorts Tournament of Champions	(United States) Danielle Kang	Won with birdie on first extra hole

== Results in LPGA majors ==
Results not in chronological order.

Tournament	2008	2009	2010	2011	2012	2013	2014	2015	2016	2017	2018	2019	2020	2021	2022	2023
Chevron Championship			T67		CUT	T25	T24	CUT	CUT	T11	T4	T6	CUT	T36	2	T28
Women's PGA Championship				CUT	T55	T49	T40	CUT	CUT	T14	T4	T21	T58	T15	T10	
U.S. Women's Open	T19	T26	CUT	T34	T39	T7	CUT	CUT	T17	T21	CUT	T10	T23	T30	T63	
The Evian Championship ^						T37	71	CUT	T22	CUT	T8	T17	NT	T38	CUT	
Women's British Open				CUT	CUT	T25	T5	CUT	CUT	WD	T42	T44		T59	T37	

^ The Evian Championship was added as a major in 2013.

Top 10
Did not play

CUT = missed the half-way cut
WD = withdrew
NT = no tournament
T = tied

=== Summary ===
Tournament	Wins	2nd	3rd	Top-5	Top-10	Top-25	Events	Cuts made
Chevron Championship	0	1	0	2	3	6	13	9
Women's PGA Championship	0	0	0	1	2	5	12	9
U.S. Women's Open	0	0	0	0	2	6	15	11
The Evian Championship	0	0	0	0	1	3	9	6
Women's British Open	0	0	0	1	1	2	11	6
Totals	0	1	0	4	9	22	60	41

- Most consecutive cuts made – 10 (2020 U.S. Open – 2022 WPGA)
- Longest streak of top-10s – 3 (2018 Evian – 2019 U.S. Open)

== LPGA Tour career summary ==
Year	Tournaments played	Cuts made*	Wins	2nds	3rds	Top 10s	Best finish	Earnings ($)	Money list rank	Scoring average	Scoring rank
2008	1	1	0	0	0	0	T19	n/a	n/a	73.50	n/a
2009	1	1	0	0	0	0	T26	n/a	n/a	73.25	n/a
2010	3	1	0	0	0	0	T67	n/a	n/a	75.12	n/a
2011	15	8	0	0	0	0	T19	52,275	92	74.18	114
2012	20	16	1	0	0	2	1	339,320	41	72.94	69
2013	21	21	0	1	0	6	T2	593,389	25	70.82	15
2014	23	18	2	0	1	6	1	817,885	16	71.55	34
2015	24	16	1	1	0	2	1	590,061	27	71.51	35
2016	23	19	0	1	2	5	2	692,803	24	70.78	21
2017	21	18	0	1	2	4	T2	702,097	26	70.18	16
2018	18	16	1	0	1	6	1	883,924	18	70.05	6
2019	18	15	0	2	0	6	2	874,588	22	70.08	15
2020	13	11	0	0	0	2	T6	246,578	46	71.11	19
2021	17	17	1	1	1	5	1	774,047	23	69.79	8
2022	14	13	0	1	0	6	2	976,487	23	70.39	23
2023	6	3	0	0	0	0	T18	62,449	149	72.65	n/a
Totals^ (as member)	233	191	6	8	7	50	1	7,605,903	43	–	–
Totals (as non-member)	5	3	0	0	0	0	T19	–	–	–	–

^ official as of 2023 season
* Includes matchplay and other tournaments without a cut.

== World ranking ==
Position in Women's World Golf Rankings at the end of each calendar year.

Year	World ranking	Source
2008	330	
2009	312	
2010	466	
2011	313	
2012	78	
2013	41	
2014	24	
2015	26	
2016	29	
2017	26	
2018	13	
2019	17	
2020	23	
2021	21	
2022	18	
2023	129	
2024	893	

== Team appearances ==
Amateur

- Espirito Santo Trophy (representing the Czech Republic): 2006
- European Girls' Team Championship (representing the Czech Republic): 2007
- Espirito Santo Trophy (representing the United States): 2010
- Junior Solheim Cup (representing the United States): 2009 (winners)
- Curtis Cup (representing the United States): 2010 (winners)

Professional

- Solheim Cup (representing the United States): 2013, 2019, 2021
- International Crown (representing the United States): 2018

=== Solheim Cup record ===
Year	Total Matches	Total W–L–H	Singles W–L–H	Foursomes W–L–H	Fourballs W–L–H	Points Won	Points %
Career	11	5–4–2	2–0–1	3–2–0	0–2–1	6	54.5
2013	4	1–2–1	0–0–1 halved w/ G. Sergas	1–1–0 won w/ M. Pressel 3&2, lost w/ M. Pressel 2&1	0–1–0 lost w/ M. Wie 2&1	1.5	37.5
2019	4	3–0–1	1–0–0 def. C. Masson 3&2	2–0–0 won w/ N. Korda 6&4, won w/ N. Korda 6&5	0–0–1 halved w/ L. Thompson	3.5	87.5
2021	3	1–2–0	1–0–0 def. C. Hull 3&1	0–1–0 lost w/ N. Korda 1 dn	0–1–0 lost w/ M. Khang 1 dn	1.0	33.3
