= Ally Ewing =

American professional golfer (born 1992)

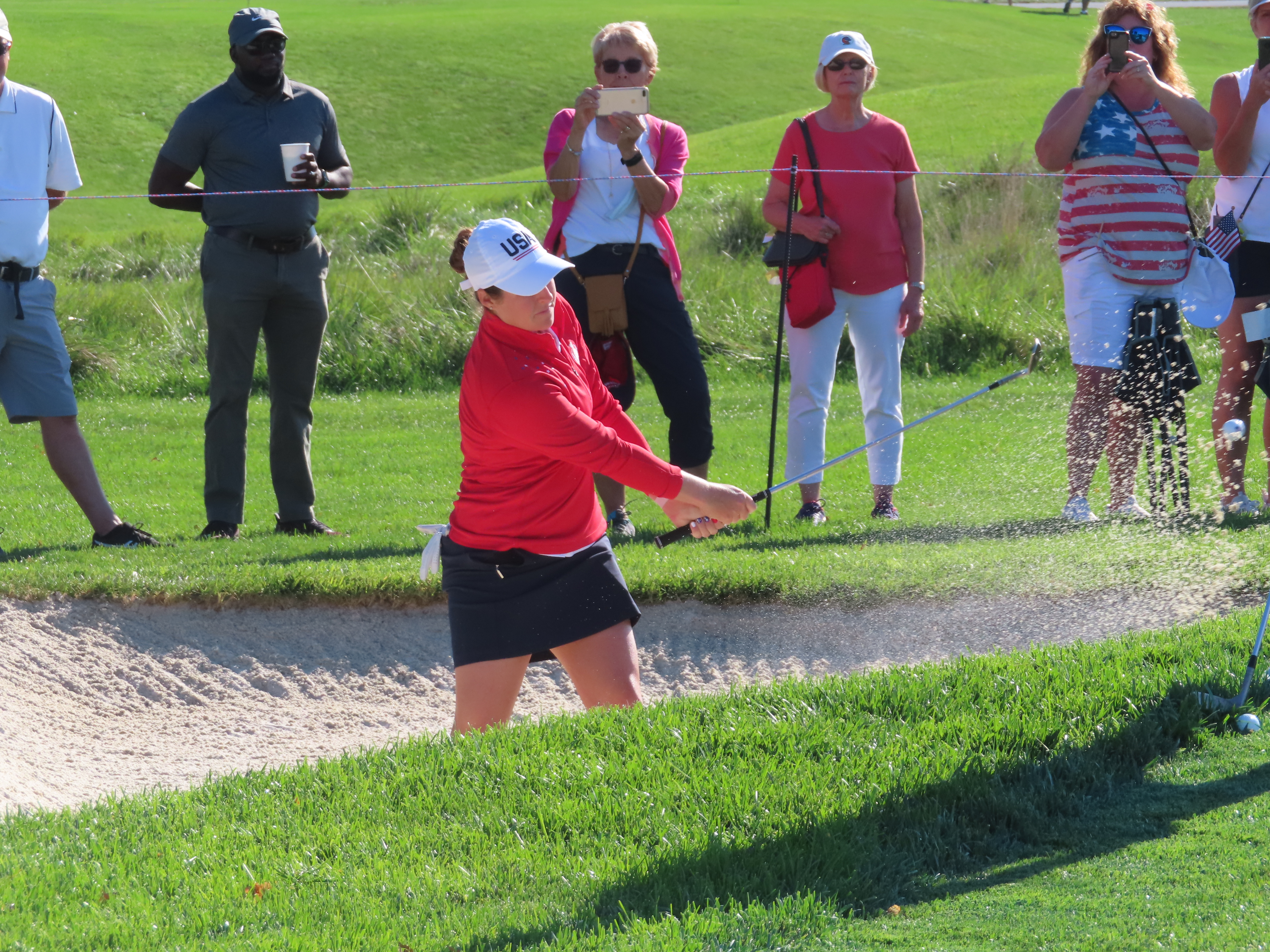
- Ewing at the 2021 Solheim Cup

Personal information
- Nationality: United States
- Born: October 25, 1992 (age 34) Tupelo, Mississippi, U.S.
- Height: 5 ft 6 in (168 cm)
- Spouse: Charlie Ewing

Career
- Sport: Golf
- College: Mississippi State University
- Turned professional: 2015
- Former tours: LPGA Tour; Symetra Tour
- Professional wins: 3

Number of wins by tour
- LPGA Tour: 3

Best results in LPGA major championships
- Chevron Championship: T6: 2019
- Women's PGA C'ship: T5: 2024
- U.S. Women's Open: T3: 2024
- Women's British Open: T6: 2023
- Evian Championship: T10: 2024

Achievements and awards
- Founders Award: 2024

Ally Leigh Ewing (née McDonald, born October 25, 1992) is an American retired professional golfer who played on the LPGA Tour.

== Personal life ==
McDonald was born in Tupelo, Mississippi and grew up in Fulton, Mississippi. She played college golf at Mississippi State University where she won five events. She also won the Mississippi State Amateur twice and the North and South Women's Amateur. She played on the winning U.S. teams in the 2013 Spirit International Amateur Golf Championship and the 2014 Curtis Cup.

Shortly after gaining her LPGA status in 2016, Ewing was diagnosed with Type 1 diabetes. She wears a glucose alarm patch at all times to monitor her blood sugar.

Ewing is a Christian. She is married to Charlie Ewing, who is the head coach of the Mississippi State women's golf team.

== Professional career ==
McDonald turned professional after graduating from college in 2015. She finished T-22 at the LPGA Final Qualifying Tournament to earn a conditional LPGA Tour card for 2016. She played primarily on the Symetra Tour in 2016, finishing runner-up four times and finishing second on the money list. She has played full-time on the LPGA Tour since 2017.

In 2019, she was named to the 2019 Solheim Cup team to replace an injured Stacy Lewis.

In October 2020, McDonald won the LPGA Drive On Championship. This was her first LPGA victory. The tournament was a new event, created in 2020 due to the cancellation of Asian events as a result of the COVID-19 pandemic.

McDonald started using her married name, Ally Ewing, in late 2020.

In May 2021, Ewing won the Bank of Hope LPGA Match-Play at Shadow Creek Golf Course in North Las Vegas, Nevada. She went 6–1–0 for the week and defeated Sophia Popov in the final match, 2 & 1.

In September 2022, Ewing would make five birdies on the back nine en route to win the Kroger Queen City Championship.

In November 2024, Ewing won Founders Award.

Ewing retired following the 2024 season.

== Professional wins (3) ==
=== LPGA Tour wins (3) ===
No.	Date	Tournament	Winning score	Margin of victory	Runner-up
1	Oct 25, 2020	LPGA Drive On Championship	−16 (66-68-69-69=272)	1 stroke	(United States) Danielle Kang
2	May 30, 2021	Bank of Hope LPGA Match-Play	2 and 1		(Germany) Sophia Popov
3	Sep 11, 2022	Kroger Queen City Championship	−22 (69-64-67-66=266)	1 stroke	(China) Xiyu Lin

== Amateur wins ==
- 2011 Big I National, Mississippi State Amateur
- 2012 Mississippi State Amateur, Las Vegas Collegiate Showdown
- 2013 NCAA Division 1 Central Regional, North and South Women's Amateur, Old Waverly Bulldog Invite
- 2014 The Schooner Fall Classic, Old Waverly Bulldog Invite

== Results in LPGA majors ==
Results not in chronological order.

Tournament	2014	2015	2016	2017	2018	2019	2020
Chevron Championship					CUT	T6	T24
Women's PGA Championship				T46	CUT	CUT	T13
U.S. Women's Open	CUT	CUT		CUT	CUT	T10	T20
The Evian Championship			T30	13	43	T11	NT
Women's British Open				T16	T28	T21	T22

Tournament	2021	2022	2023	2024	2025	2026
Chevron Championship	T7	T44	T23	T30		
U.S. Women's Open	T41	T24	11	T3		CUT
Women's PGA Championship	T52	CUT	CUT	T5		
The Evian Championship	CUT	T54	CUT	T10		
Women's British Open	CUT	T51	T6	T37		

Top 10
Did not play

CUT = missed the half-way cut
NT = no tournament
"T" = tied

=== Summary ===
Tournament	Wins	2nd	3rd	Top-5	Top-10	Top-25	Events	Cuts made
Chevron Championship	0	0	0	0	2	4	7	6
U.S. Women's Open	0	0	1	1	2	5	11	6
Women's PGA Championship	0	0	0	1	1	2	8	5
The Evian Championship	0	0	0	0	1	3	8	6
Women's British Open	0	0	0	0	1	4	8	7
Totals	0	0	1	2	7	18	42	30

- Most consecutive cuts made – 9 (2019 Evian – 2021 WPGA)
- Longest streak of top-10s – 3 (2024 U.S. Women's Open – 2024 Evian)

== World ranking ==
Position in Women's World Golf Rankings at the end of each calendar year.

Year	Ranking	Source
2015	615	
2016	244	
2017	117	
2018	98	
2019	59	
2020	35	
2021	22	
2022	35	
2023	34	
2024	20	
2025	138	

== U.S. national team appearances ==
Amateur

- The Spirit International Amateur Golf Championship: 2013 (winners)
- Curtis Cup: 2014 (winners)

Professional

- Solheim Cup: 2019, 2021, 2023, 2024 (winners)

=== Solheim Cup record ===
Year	Total matches	Total W–L–H	Singles W–L–H	Foursomes W–L–H	Fourballs W–L–H	Points won	Points %
Career	16	3–12–1	0–4–0	1–4–1	2–4–0	3.5	21.9
2019	4	1–3–0	0–1–0 lost to B. Law 2&1	0–1–0 lost w/ L. Salas 3&2	1–1–0 won w/ A. Yin 7&5 lost w/ A. Yin 2 dn	1.0	21.8
2021	4	1–2–1	0–1–0 lost to M. Sagström 3&2	0–1–1 halved w/ M. Khang lost w/ N. Korda 5&4	1–0–0 won w/ N. Korda 1 up	1.5	37.5
2023	4	1–3–0	0–1–0 lost to C. Hedwall 2 dn	1–0–0 won w/ C. Knight 5&4	0–2–0 lost w/ A. Yin 4&2 lost w/ N. Korda 4&3	1.0	25.0
2024	4	0–4–0	0–1–0 lost to L. Maguire 4&3	0–2–0 lost w/ J. Kupcho 2 dn lost w/ J. Kupcho 1 dn	0–1–0 lost w/ L. Thompson 2&1	0.0	0.0
