= 2022 LPGA Tour =

Professional women's golf tour

2022 LPGA Tour season
- Duration: January 20, 2022 – November 20, 2022
- Number of official events: 34 (2 canceled, now 32)
- Most wins: 3 (New Zealand) Lydia Ko, (United States) Jennifer Kupcho
- Race to CME Globe Winner: (New Zealand) Lydia Ko
- Money leader: (New Zealand) Lydia Ko
- Vare Trophy: (New Zealand) Lydia Ko
- Rolex Player of the Year: (New Zealand) Lydia Ko
- Rookie of the Year: (Thailand) Atthaya Thitikul

The 2022 LPGA Tour was the 73rd edition of the LPGA Tour, a series of professional golf tournaments for elite female golfers from around the world. The season began at the Hilton Grand Vacations Tournament of Champions, in Lake Buena Vista, Florida, on January 20, and ended on November 20, at the Tiburón Golf Club in the CME Group Tour Championship at Naples, Florida. The tournaments were sanctioned by the United States–based Ladies Professional Golf Association (LPGA).

== Schedule and results ==
The number in parentheses after each winners' name is the player's total number of wins in official money individual events on the LPGA Tour, including that event. Tournament and winner names in bold indicate LPGA majors. The schedule and purse amount for each tournament is listed on the LPGA website. The LPGA has a standard formula for payout percentages and distribution of its purse and prize money for every event. The winner typically gets 15% of the total, second place gets 9.3%, third place 6.75%, etc.

The total prize money to be won increased to $88.9 million for the 34 scheduled to be played, $19.7 million more than in 2021, with another $3.2 million increase announced by the U.S. Women's Open from $6.8 million to $10 million, the largest purse in women's golf, in January 2022. The 2021 total was $69.2 million in its 30 played tournaments, with five canceled. The CME Group Tour Championship then had that tournament's purse at $5 million, and the winner's share of $1.5 million. For 2022, it will offer a larger purse of $7 million, and pay the winner $2.0 million, the largest winner's payout ever in woman's golf, with the year's purse now $90.9 million. The KPMG Women's PGA Championship on June 21, announced a doubling of its purse from $4.5 million to $9 million for the second-highest on the tour, with the winner now receiving $1.35 million from $675,0000. The total purse for 2022 jumps from $90.9 million to a new record $95.4 million. The Evian Championship announced its purse increase from $4.5 million to $6.5 million, and the winner's share jumps from $675,000 to $1 million. The total purse for 2022 is now a record $97.4 million. The Buick LPGA Shanghai event, with a purse of $2.1 million was canceled on July 6, dropping the total for the year to $95.3 million. The AIG Women's Open increased its purse and winner's share on August 3, from $6.8 million ($1.02 million), to $7.3 million ($1.095 million) The purse for 2022 increases $500,000 to $95.8 million. The Taiwan Swinging Skirts LPGA, with a purse of $2.2 million, was canceled on August 10 due to ongoing COVID-19-related travel restrictions, dropping the total for the year to $93.6 million. The Portland Classic increased its purse $100,000 to $1.5 million on May 11, total for 2022 now $93.7 million. The Volunteers of America Classic tournament starting on September 29, increased its purse $200,000 from its previous $1.5 million, pushing the 2022 total to $93.9 million.

Key

Major championships
Regular events

Date	Tournament	Location	Winner(s) (Note: The number in brackets after each winner's name is the number of LPGA Tour events he had won up to and including that tournament. This information is only shown for LPGA Tour members.)	WWGR points	Other tours (Note: JLPGA − LPGA of Japan Tour, LET − Ladies European Tour.)	Purse (US$)	Winner's share ($)
Jan 23	Hilton Grand Vacations Tournament of Champions	Florida	(United States) Danielle Kang (6)	31		1,500,000	225,000
Jan 30	Gainbridge LPGA at Boca Rio	Florida	(New Zealand) Lydia Ko (17)	56		2,000,000	300,000
Feb 5	LPGA Drive On Championship	Florida	(Republic of Ireland) Leona Maguire (1)	46		1,500,000	225,000
Mar 6	HSBC Women's World Championship	Singapore	(South Korea) Ko Jin-young (13)	50		1,700,000	255,000
Mar 13	Honda LPGA Thailand	Thailand	(Denmark) Nanna Koerstz Madsen (1)	34		1,600,000	240,000
Mar 27	JTBC Classic	California	(Thailand) Atthaya Thitikul (1)	62		1,500,000	225,000
Apr 3	**Chevron Championship**	California	(United States) **Jennifer Kupcho** (1)	**100**		5,000,000	750,000
Apr 16	Lotte Championship	Hawaii	(South Korea) Kim Hyo-joo (5)	40		2,000,000	300,000
Apr 24	DIO Implant LA Open	California	(Japan) Nasa Hataoka (6)	53		1,500,000	225,000
May 1	Palos Verdes Championship	California	(United States) Marina Alex (2)	53		1,500,000	225,000
May 15	Cognizant Founders Cup	New Jersey	(Australia) Minjee Lee (7)	46		3,000,000	450,000
May 29	Bank of Hope LPGA Match-Play	Nevada	(South Korea) Ji Eun-hee (6)	28		1,500,000	225,000
Jun 5	**U.S. Women's Open**	North Carolina	(Australia) **Minjee Lee** (8)	**100**		10,000,000	1,800,000
Jun 12	ShopRite LPGA Classic	New Jersey	(Canada) Brooke Henderson (11)	28		1,750,000	262,500
Jun 19	Meijer LPGA Classic	Michigan	(United States) Jennifer Kupcho (2)	56		2,500,000	375,000
Jun 26	**KPMG Women's PGA Championship**	Maryland	(South Korea) **Chun In-gee** (4)	**100**		9,000,000	1,350,000
Jul 16	Dow Great Lakes Bay Invitational	Michigan	(United States) Jennifer Kupcho (3) and (United States) Lizette Salas (2)	n/a		2,500,000	301,586 (each)
Jul 24	**Evian Championship**	France	(Canada) **Brooke Henderson** (12)	**100**		6,500,000	1,000,000
Jul 31	Trust Golf Women's Scottish Open	Scotland	(Japan) Ayaka Furue (1)	62	LET	2,000,000	300,000
Aug 7	**AIG Women's Open**	Scotland	(South Africa) **Ashleigh Buhai** (1)	**100**		7,300,000	1,095,000
Aug 14	ISPS Handa World Invitational	Northern Ireland	(Sweden) Maja Stark (1)	19	LET	1,500,000	225,000
Aug 28	CP Women's Open	Canada	(South Africa) Paula Reto (1)	56		2,350,000	352,500
Sep 4	Dana Open	Ohio	(Mexico) Gaby López (3)	46		1,750,000	262,500
Sep 11	Kroger Queen City Championship	Ohio	(United States) Ally Ewing (3)	43		1,750,000	262,500
Sep 18	Portland Classic	Oregon	(United States) Andrea Lee (1)	24		1,500,000	225,000
Sep 25	Walmart NW Arkansas Championship	Arkansas	(Thailand) Atthaya Thitikul (2)	56		2,300,000	345,000
Oct 2	Volunteers of America Classic	Texas	(England) Charley Hull (2)	46		1,700,000	255,000
Oct 9	LPGA Mediheal Championship	California	(England) Jodi Ewart Shadoff (1)	28		1,800,000	270,000
~~Oct 16~~	Buick LPGA Shanghai	China	Tournament canceled			~~2,100,000~~	–
Oct 23	BMW Ladies Championship	South Korea	(New Zealand) Lydia Ko (18)	43		2,000,000	300,000
~~Oct 30~~	Taiwan Swinging Skirts LPGA	Taiwan	Tournament canceled			~~2,200,000~~	–
Nov 6	Toto Japan Classic	Japan	(Scotland) Gemma Dryburgh (1)	34	JLPGA	2,000,000	300,000
Nov 13	Pelican Women's Championship	Florida	(United States) Nelly Korda (8)	50		2,000,000	300,000
Nov 20	CME Group Tour Championship	Florida	(New Zealand) Lydia Ko (19)	62		7,000,000	2,000,000

== Statistics leaders ==
=== Money list leaders ===
Rank	Player	Events	Prize money ($)
1	(New Zealand) Lydia Ko	22	4,364,403
2	(Australia) Minjee Lee	20	3,809,960
3	(South Korea) Chun In-gee	19	2,673,860
4	(Canada) Brooke Henderson	22	2,413,251
5	(Thailand) Atthaya Thitikul	26	2,193,642
6	(South Korea) Choi Hye-jin	27	2,075,696
7	(United States) Jennifer Kupcho	26	1,955,531
8	(United States) Lexi Thompson	18	1,929,718
9	(Republic of Ireland) Leona Maguire	24	1,812,831
10	(South Africa) Ashleigh Buhai	24	1,553,004

Source and complete list: LPGA official website.

=== Scoring average ===
Rank	Player	Total strokes	Total rounds	Average
1	(New Zealand) Lydia Ko	5,864	85	68.988
2	(South Korea) Kim Hyo-joo	4,094	59	69.390
3	(Thailand) Atthaya Thitikul	6,668	96	69.458
4	(Canada) Brooke Henderson	5,283	76	69.513
5	(China) Lin Xiyu	6,120	88	69.545
6	(United States) Nelly Korda	3,483	50	69.660
7	(Australia) Minjee Lee	5,018	72	69.694
8	(United States) Lexi Thompson	4,182	60	69.700
9	(United States) Danielle Kang	4,253	61	69.721
10	(South Korea) Choi Hye-jin	6,554	94	69.723

Source and complete list: LPGA official website.

== See also ==
- 2022 Ladies European Tour
- 2022 Epson Tour
