= Nelly Korda =

American professional golfer (born 1998)

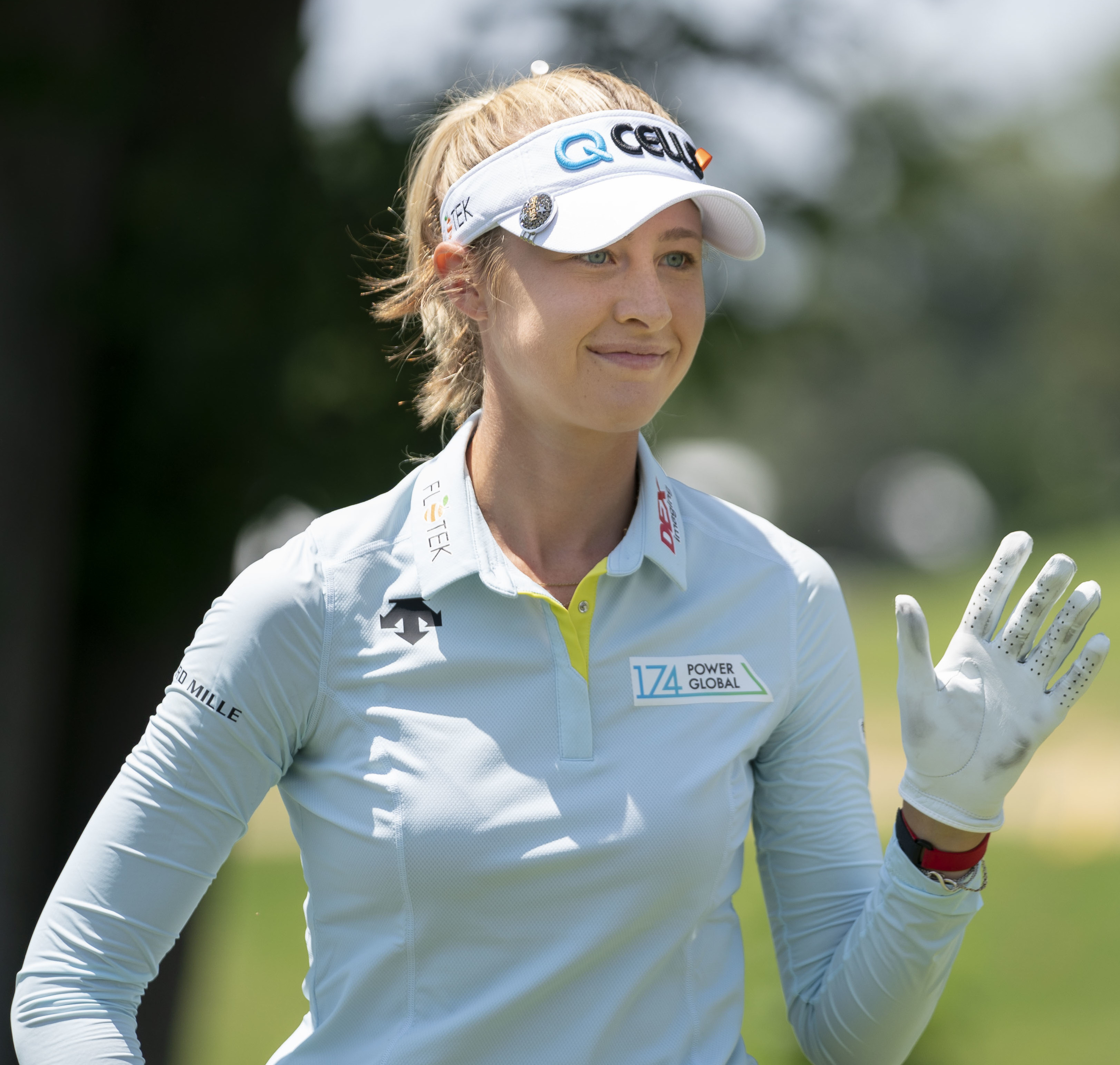
- Korda in 2019

Personal information
- Nationality: United States
- Born: July 28, 1998 (age 28) Bradenton, Florida, U.S.
- Height: 5 ft 10 in (178 cm)

Career
- Sport: Golf
- College: None
- Turned professional: 2016
- Current tour: LPGA Tour (joined 2017)
- Former tour: Symetra Tour (joined 2016)
- Professional wins: 24

Number of wins by tour
- LPGA Tour: 19
- Ladies European Tour: 3
- Epson Tour: 1
- Other: 1

Best results in LPGA major championships (wins: 4)
- Chevron Championship: Won: 2024, 2026
- Women's PGA C'ship: Won: 2021
- U.S. Women's Open: Won: 2026
- Women's British Open: T2: 2024
- Evian Championship: T8: 2022

Achievements and awards
- LPGA Tour Player of the Year: 2024, 2026
- Race to the CME Globe: 2024, 2026
- Rolex Annika Major Award: 2024, 2026
- GWAA Female Player of the Year: 2021, 2024
Medal record
Women's golf
Representing United States
Olympic Games
Gold medal – first place	2020 Tokyo	Individual

Nelly Korda (born July 28, 1998) is an American professional golfer who plays on the LPGA Tour. She is a four-time major winner, claiming victories at the 2021 Women's PGA Championship, the 2024 and 2026 Chevron Championships and the 2026 U.S. Women's Open. In total, she has won 24 professional titles including 19 on the LPGA Tour and was a gold medalist at the 2020 Summer Olympics. She has spent over 100 weeks as number one in the Women's World Golf Rankings and in both 2021 and 2024 finished as year-end number one. She has represented the United States at five Solheim Cups and was a member of the winning team in 2024.

Korda turned professional in 2016 and won her first professional tournament at the Sioux Falls GreatLIFE Challenge the same year. She began playing on the LPGA Tour in 2017 and won her first LPGA event in 2018 at the Swinging Skirts LPGA Taiwan Championship. In 2019, she triumphed at the Women's Australian Open and subsequently entered the top-10 of the world rankings for the first time. Korda won further LPGA titles, and in 2021, she claimed her first major with victory at the 2021 Women's PGA Championship, with her victory also taking her to world number one.

At the delayed 2020 Summer Olympics, she became the first American female golfer to win individual gold at an Olympic Games since 1900. In 2024, Korda became the third player to have won five consecutive tournaments on the LPGA Tour and this run culminated with her second win in a major: the 2024 Chevron Championship. In September that year, Korda became a member of the United States team that were victorious at the Solheim Cup and she finished the year with seven individual LPGA titles before being named LPGA Tour Player of the Year.

Korda is from a family of professional athletes. Her father Petr was a tennis player who won the 1998 Australian Open, her younger brother Sebastian is a professional tennis player, and her older sister Jessica is a professional golfer. In 2018, Nelly Korda's maiden LPGA Tour victory meant that she and Jessica became the third pair of sisters to have both claimed victory in LPGA Tour events and in 2019, they became the first sisters to play as a pairing in a Solheim Cup match.

== Amateur career ==
Korda trained at the IMG Academy in her hometown of Bradenton, Florida. At the age of 14, she made the cut at the 2013 U.S. Women's Open, and eventually finished tied-64th. The following year, she was triumphant at the Kathy Whitworth Invitational, and was also given an invitation to compete at the 2014 Kraft Nabisco Championship as one of nine amateur players in the field. In January 2015, she sealed victory at the Harder Hall Invitational, having been penalized two-penalty strokes on the first hole for using a caddie, which was prohibited at the event. During 2015, she also claimed victory at the Yani Tseng Invitational, and finished runner-up at the Rolex Girls Junior Championship. Korda was then selected to represent the United States in the 2015 Junior Solheim Cup at Golf Club St. Leon-Rot, Germany. There, the United States won 13‍–‍11, to become the first team to win the tournament away from home. In October, she won the PING Invitational, which moved her into the top-10 of the World Amateur Golf Ranking, and she was also a 2015 AJGA Rolex Junior All-American.

== Professional career ==
Korda began her professional career in 2016 on the Symetra Tour, where she won her first professional event at the Sioux Falls GreatLIFE Challenge. There, she finished three strokes ahead of runner-up Wichanee Meechai. After a tied-6th finish at the Symetra Tour Championship, she ended the season ninth on the Symetra Tour money list, which earned her an LPGA Tour card for 2017. Korda made her LPGA Tour debut at the Pure Silk-Bahamas LPGA Classic in 2017, where she finished tied-5th. Later in the year, she arrived at the season-ending 2017 CME Group Tour Championship in 51st place on the LPGA Tour official money list. Korda admitted that she had "struggled" with all the traveling during the year. At the CME Group Tour Championship, she ended her season with a tied-8th finish.

=== 2018: First LPGA Tour win ===
At the beginning of 2018, Korda appointed Jason McDede as her caddie. In March, she finished runner-up at the HSBC Women's World Championship in Singapore. She missed an eight-foot putt on the final hole which would have forced a playoff with Michelle Wie. Korda also recorded a top-10 finish at the U.S. Women's Open in June, finishing in a tie for tenth place. On October 28, 2018, she secured a two-stroke victory at the Swinging Skirts LPGA Taiwan Championship in Taoyuan, Taiwan, to seal her maiden LPGA Tour title. The win made her and her sister Jessica Korda the third pair of sisters to have claimed LPGA Tour titles, joining Moriya and Ariya Jutanugarn, along with Charlotta and Annika Sörenstam. At the end of the year, she finished runner-up at the CME Group Tour Championship. Korda recorded a total of seven top-10 finishes on the LPGA Tour in 2018.

=== 2019−2020: Top-10 of rankings and Solheim Cup debut ===
After finishing third at the Diamond Resorts Tournament of Champions, Korda then won the ISPS Handa Women's Australian Open in February. She won the tournament by a two-stroke margin over Ko Jin-young. In doing so, she completed a "Family Slam" in Australia. Her father, Petr, won the 1998 Australian Open singles in tennis. Her older sister, Jessica, won the Women's Australian Open golf tournament in 2012, and her younger brother, Sebastian, won the 2018 Australian Open Boys' singles in tennis. Following this victory, Korda broke into the top-10 of the Women's World Golf Rankings, moving up from 16th to 9th, and becoming the second highest ranked American in the world, behind 5th ranked Lexi Thompson. At majors, she recorded a tied-3rd place finish at the Women's PGA Championship and a tied-9th finish at the Women's British Open.

Korda made her Solheim Cup debut in 2019 at Gleneagles, Scotland. She made history in the day one foursomes with Jessica Korda, when they became the first sisters to be playing partners in the history of the competition. They beat Caroline Masson and Jodi Ewart Shadoff, 6 and 4, on the first day and followed this up by defeating Carlota Ciganda and Bronte Law, 6 and 5, on the second day. Korda then triumphed over Caroline Hedwall, 2 up, in the singles to complete the tournament with an unbeaten 3‍–‍0‍–‍1 (win‍–‍loss‍–‍tie) record. The United States suffered an overall 13.5‍–‍14.5 defeat to Europe.

In September, Korda finished runner-up at the Hanwha Classic, but then shot a four-under-par 67 in the final round to win the Lacoste Ladies Open de France by eight shots, thus recording her first victory in a Ladies European Tour event. In November, she defended her title at the Swinging Skirts LPGA Taiwan Championship. The tournament concluded with a three-way playoff, in which Korda overcame Minjee Lee and Masson to claim victory. At the CME Group Tour Championship, she finished in tied-3rd position. In 2019, Korda recorded twelve top-10 finishes on the LPGA Tour.

In March 2020, the LPGA suspended competition due to the COVID-19 pandemic. The LPGA Tour resumed later in the year, and Korda finished tied-3rd at the Walmart NW Arkansas Championship in August, before coming close to winning her first major championship at the ANA Inspiration the following month. There, she reached a three-way playoff with Mirim Lee and Brooke Henderson, but it was Lee who won the trophy on the first extra hole. She also finished fifth at the ShopRite LPGA Classic in October.

=== 2021: Breakout year: four wins, first major win, Olympic gold, #1 world ranking ===
In February, Korda won the Gainbridge LPGA by a three-shot margin at Lake Nona Golf & Country Club in Orlando, Florida. She finished tied-3rd at the ANA Inspiration in April, seven strokes behind Patty Tavatanakit. She then won the Meijer LPGA Classic in June, becoming the first two-time winner on the LPGA Tour for the year. Her tournament included a career best 62, carded in the third round. Later that month, Korda won her first major at the 2021 Women's PGA Championship at the Atlanta Athletic Club in Georgia. In the final round, she shot a four-under-par 68 and won by three strokes over Lizette Salas. With the victory, she also became the number one ranked player in the world. Korda said "A major championship and No. 1 in the world. Is this week even real?" She finished the tournament with a score of 19-under-par, which equaled the tournament's lowest ever score set by Inbee Park in 2015.

Korda then competed for the United States at the delayed Summer Olympics in Japan. During her second round, she reached the 18th tee at 11-under-par for her round. A birdie on the final hole would have carded her a 59 but she double-bogeyed the hole for a 62. Two days later, she won the gold medal, and became just the second female golfer from the United States to achieve the feat, and the first since Margaret Abbott at the 1900 Olympic Games. Korda represented the United States again at the 2021 Solheim Cup in Toledo, Ohio. She finished the event with a 2‍–‍2‍–‍0 record, which included a 1 up victory over Georgia Hall in the singles, but the United States lost 13‍–‍15 overall.

After Ko Jin-young won the BMW Ladies Championship in October, Korda fell to number two in the world rankings, but she regained the number one spot in November. Neither Korda or Ko Jin-young had competed in tournaments between those dates, but the rankings are taken over a two-year rolling average which resulted in Korda regaining the top position. Korda then won the Pelican Women's Championship in Belleair, Florida. She shot a final-round 69 and then won in a playoff against Thompson, Lydia Ko and Kim Sei-young. She reached the playoff despite scoring a triple-bogey seven on the par-4 17th hole. Korda made a birdie in the playoff to seal the victory, tying her with Ko Jin-young with four LPGA Tour wins in 2021. Korda became the first American to win four times in an LPGA Tour season since Stacy Lewis in 2012. She finished tied-5th in the CME Group Tour Championship, and finished the year as world number one.

Korda had the lowest scoring average on tour (68.774) in her 62 rounds, and she finished second on the money list ($2,382,198) to Ko Jin-young ($3,502,161). Neither Korda or Ko Jin-young won the Vare Trophy for the lowest scoring average as they had not played the minimum 70 rounds, so Lydia Ko was awarded the trophy.

=== 2022: Blood clot, battle for the #1 world ranking ===
On January 3, 2022, Korda surpassed the record for the most consecutive weeks as world number one by an American, which had been held by Lewis who was number one for 21 straight weeks. Three weeks later at the Gainbridge LPGA at Boca Rio, she tied for 20th place and lost the number one spot after 29 consecutive weeks at the top. In March, she announced that she had a blood clot in her arm, so she would not compete in the Chevron Championship, the year's first major. Following surgery, Korda returned to play at the U.S. Women's Open in June, where she finished tied-8th. Later in the month, at the Meijer LPGA Classic, she reached a three-way playoff but missed out on the title to Jennifer Kupcho, with Korda being eliminated from the playoff after the first extra-hole. She also recorded a tied-8th place finish at the Evian Championship in July, and she finished in a tie for second position at the Canadian Women's Open in August. That same month, Korda cliched victory in the Aramco Team Series event in Sotogrande. She finished three shots clear of a group of players tied for second place which included her sister Jessica.

In November, Korda successfully defended her title at the Pelican Women's Championship, her first victory of the year, and she subsequently returned to the top of the world rankings. She did not hold the position for long as Lydia Ko regained the number one spot two weeks later. Later that month, at the CME Group Tour Championship, Korda finished in a tie for tenth place, her eighth top-10 finish on the LPGA Tour for the year.

=== 2023: Return to #1 ===
In January, Korda signed a deal with TaylorMade and Nike. Later in the year, she signed with Delta Air Lines. She also joined fellow golfer Tony Finau on the T-Mobile US sponsored players list.

With her fourth-place finish at the Hilton Grand Vacations Tournament of Champions in January, Korda rose to 37th on the career money list with $7,638,934, passing her sister Jessica, ranked 39th at $7,543,454; Nelly had played 110 tournaments to Jessica's 227. In February, she finished T6th at the Honda LPGA Thailand, and she finished runner-up at the HSBC Women's World Championship in March, ending the competition two strokes behind Ko Jin-young. Then, after finishing third at the Chevron Championship in April, she regained the number one world ranking. At the beginning of May, Korda represented the United States at the International Crown. The United States team made it to the semi-finals, in which they suffered a defeat to Thailand. Later in May, she announced that she would miss several tournaments because of back pain. In July, she won the Aramco Team Series at the Centurion Club near London, to secure her third victory on the Ladies European Tour. She then finished tied-9th at the Evian Championship later in the month.

At the 2023 Solheim Cup at Finca Cortesin in Casares, Andalusia, Korda finished with a 2‍–‍2‍–‍0 record. Europe and the United States finished the event tied on 14 points, resulting in Europe retaining the trophy. Korda won two matches partnering Allisen Corpuz in the foursomes but lost her singles match, 2 and 1, to Ciganda, as well as a fourballs match playing alongside Ally Ewing.

=== 2024: Return to #1, five consecutive starting wins and total seven wins, second major title, LPGA Tour Player of the Year ===
In January, Korda won her ninth LPGA Tour event, at the LPGA Drive On Championship in her hometown of Braderton. Trailing by three strokes after the 16th hole of the final round, she had an eagle-birdie finish to force a playoff with Lydia Ko. Korda then won on the second extra hole with a four-foot par putt after Ko had missed a five-foot putt. It was the first tournament that she had won after leading at the end of each round. She then won three further consecutive events in March and April: Fir Hills Seri Pak Championship (moving back to the top of the Women's World Golf Rankings), the Ford Championship, and the T-Mobile Match Play. At the Match Play, she overcame Leona Maguire, 4 and 3, in the final. Her four straight tournament wins from four starts made her the first player to achieve this feat since Lorena Ochoa in 2008.

Korda continued her winning start to the year with a fifth consecutive victory, and her second major title, at the 2024 Chevron Championship, scoring a 275 (−13, 68-69-69-69) to win by a two-stroke margin over Maja Stark. Only Annika Sörenstam (2004–2005) and Nancy Lopez (1978) had won five consecutive starts before Korda became the third LPGA player to achieve the feat. She withdrew from the next tournament, the JM Eagle LA Championship, choosing to rest and have a mental break. In May, Korda won the Mizuho Americas Open, her sixth win in seven starts. She finished the event 14-under-par, edging out Hannah Green by one stroke to claim the victory.

At the Women's British Open, Korda held a two-stroke lead during the final round, but dropped shots cost her and she finished tied-3rd, two strokes behind the champion Lydia Ko. She was unable to successfully defend her Olympic title at the 2024 Summer Olympics, finishing the event one-under-par, six strokes adrift of the bronze medal position. Korda was then part of the United States team that defeated Europe 15.5‍–‍12.5 in the 2024 Solheim Cup at the Robert Trent Jones Golf Club in Gainesville, Virginia. Korda won three of her four matches, with her only defeat coming in the final-day singles where she was defeated 6 and 4 by Charley Hull. Korda finished with a 3‍–‍1‍–‍0 record in the tournament.

In November, she won The Annika, to claim her seventh LPGA title of the year. She clinched the LPGA Tour Player of the Year award with three tournaments remaining on the schedule, after claiming seven victories and three additional top-10 finishes. She was the first player to win seven LPGA Tour events in a single year since Yani Tseng achieved the feat in 2011. She also won the Rolex Annika Major Award.

=== 2025: Winless year and loss of #1 ranking ===
Korda finished runner-up at the Tournament of Champions in February, two strokes behind winner Kim A-lim. The following week, she finished tied-7th at the LPGA Founders Cup, and she later finished tied-2nd at the U.S. Women's Open, two strokes behind Stark. In June, Korda reached the landmark of 100 career weeks as world number one, the sixth female player to reach this milestone. In July, she posted a fifth-place finish at the Women's Scottish Open. Without a win in 2025, and following a tied-36th place finish at the Women's British Open in August, Korda lost her world number one ranking to Atthaya Thitikul, a position that she had held for 71 consecutive weeks. Still chasing her first victory of the year, Korda finished in a tie for fourth at the Lotte Championship in October, three strokes off the pace. The following week, she withdrew from the United States team for the forthcoming International Crown due to an injury. Korda concluded her LPGA Tour season with a third-place finish at the CME Group Tour Championship, six strokes behind tournament winner Thitikul.

=== 2026: Back-to-back major victories ===
In January, Korda won her first LPGA Tour event since November 2024 at the Tournament of Champions. The final round of the event was cancelled due to bad weather, and she finished with a three-stroke victory over Amy Yang. Korda was runner-up at the Fortinet Founders Cup in March after finishing one stroke behind Hyo Joo Kim, and one week later, ended runner-up to her again at the Ford Championship. At the Aramco Championship in Las Vegas, Korda finished in a tie for second, five strokes behind Lauren Coughlin.

At the Chevron Championship, Korda started the tournament with a seven-under-par 65, her best start to a major in four years to take a two-shot lead after the first round. In the second round, Korda shot another seven-under-par 65, giving her a six-shot lead going into the weekend. In the third round, Korda tied the 54-hole scoring record at The Chevron Championship after a two-under-par 70 that left her at 16-under 200. In the final round, Korda closed with a two-under-par 70 for a five-shot victory and her third career major. The win also returned her to number one in the world rankings. One week later, Korda won the Riviera Maya Open by four shots for her second consecutive victory. She became the first golfer since Annika Sorenstam in 2001 to start a season with top-2 finishes in her first six events.

In the U.S. Women's Open at Riviera Country Club, Korda shot a two-over-par 73 in her opening round. In the second round, she carded the low round of the day with a four-under-par 67, leaving her two shots off the lead. She took a share of the lead after the third round by shooting another four-under-par 67, ending with three consecutive birdies and finishing even with Kim Sei-young at six-under-par. Korda shot a two-under-par 69 in the final round to win her first U.S. Women's Open.

Korda arrived at the Women's PGA Championship attempting to win a third consecutive major. She began her final round four strokes behind the leader, but finished in a tie for eighth. Korda placed tied-4th at the Women's British Open, and won the Rolex Annika Major Award. She became the second player to have won the award twice.

Korda represented the United States in the 2026 Solheim Cup at Bernardus Golf in the Nertherlands. In the day one foursomes, she partnered Corpuz, with the pair defeating Hull and Lottie Woad. This was the fifth successive time that the pair had won a career Solheim Cup foursomes match—a competition record. The pair's winning run in the format ended on day two with a defeat by Maja Stark and Linn Grant. On day three, Korda beat Mimi Rhodes 4 and 2 in the singles to end the event with a 2–1–1 record, but the United States were defeated 13–15 by Europe.

Korda won the LPGA Tour Player of the Year award.

== Personal life ==
Korda is the daughter of retired Czech professional tennis players Petr Korda and Regina Rajchrtová. Her father is a tennis Grand Slam champion who won the 1998 Australian Open crown. Her younger brother, Sebastian, won the 2018 Australian Open boys' singles tennis title. Her older sister, Jessica Korda, is a professional golfer who plays on the LPGA Tour.

In 2019, Korda was in a relationship with professional ice hockey player Andreas Athanasiou. In November 2025, she announced her engagement to Casey Gunderson.

In 2021, Korda made the Forbes 30 under 30 list for earners under the age of 30, placed 23. In 2024, Korda was named by Sportico as the eighth highest earning female athlete in the world with earnings of $14.4m across both prize money and endorsements.

The American Junior Golf Association named a junior tournament after her: the Nelly Invitational is held at The Concession Golf Club in Bradenton, Florida.

Korda made a cameo appearance as a doctor in the 2025 sports comedy film Happy Gilmore 2. In the same year, she posed for the Sports Illustrated Swimsuit Issue.

== Amateur wins ==
- 2014 Kathy Whitworth Invitational
- 2015 Harder Hall Invitational, Yani Tseng Invitational, PING Invitational

== Professional wins (24) ==
=== LPGA Tour wins (19) ===
Legend
Major championships (4)
Other LPGA Tour (15)

#	Date	Tournament	Winning score	To par	Margin of victory	Runner(s)-up	Winner's share ($)	Ref.
1	Oct 28, 2018	Swinging Skirts LPGA Taiwan Championship	67-71-69-68=275	−13	2 strokes	(Australia) Minjee Lee	330,000	
2	Feb 17, 2019	ISPS Handa Women's Australian Open	71-66-67-67=271	−17	2 strokes	(South Korea) Ko Jin-young	195,000	
3	Nov 3, 2019	Taiwan Swinging Skirts LPGA (2)	66-67-65-72=270	−18	Playoff	(Australia) Minjee Lee (Germany) Caroline Masson	330,000	
4	Feb 28, 2021	Gainbridge LPGA	67-68-68-69=272	−16	3 strokes	(New Zealand) Lydia Ko (United States) Lexi Thompson	300,000	
5	Jun 20, 2021	Meijer LPGA Classic	68-66-62-67=263	−25	2 strokes	(Republic of Ireland) Leona Maguire	345,000	
6	Jun 27, 2021	KPMG Women's PGA Championship	70-63-68-68=269	−19	3 strokes	(United States) Lizette Salas	675,000	
7	Nov 14, 2021	Pelican Women's Championship	65-66-63-69=263	−17	Playoff	(South Korea) Kim Sei-young (New Zealand) Lydia Ko (United States) Lexi Thompson	262,500	
8	Nov 13, 2022	Pelican Women's Championship (2)	66-66-64=196	−14	1 stroke	(United States) Lexi Thompson	300,000	
9	Jan 28, 2024	LPGA Drive On Championship	65-67-68-73=273	−11	Playoff	(New Zealand) Lydia Ko	262,500	
10	Mar 24, 2024	Fir Hills Seri Pak Championship	72-67-67-69=275	−9	Playoff	(United States) Ryann O'Toole	300,000	
11	Mar 31, 2024	Ford Championship	66-68-69-65=268	−20	2 strokes	(Australia) Hira Naveed	337,500	
12	Apr 7, 2024	T-Mobile Match Play	4 and 3			(Republic of Ireland) Leona Maguire	300,000	
13	Apr 21, 2024	Chevron Championship	68-69-69-69=275	−13	2 strokes	(Sweden) Maja Stark	1,200,000	
14	May 19, 2024	Mizuho Americas Open	70-68-65-71=274	−14	1 stroke	(Australia) Hannah Green	450,000	
15	Nov 17, 2024	The Annika (3)	66-66-67-67=266	−14	3 strokes	(England) Charley Hull (South Korea) Im Jin-hee (China) Zhang Weiwei	487,500	
16	Feb 1, 2026	Hilton Grand Vacations Tournament of Champions	68-71-64=203	−13	3 strokes	(South Korea) Amy Yang	315,000	
17	Apr 26, 2026	Chevron Championship (2)	65-65-70-70=270	−18	5 strokes	(Thailand) Patty Tavatanakit (China) Yin Ruoning	1,350,000	
18	May 3, 2026	Riviera Maya Open	68-67-67-69=271	−17	4 strokes	(Thailand) Arpichaya Yubol	375,000	
19	Jun 7, 2026	U.S. Women's Open	73-67-67-69=276	−8	1 stroke	(England) Charley Hull (Mexico) Gaby López	2,500,000	

==== LPGA Tour playoff record (4–2) ====
#	Year	Tournament	Opponents	Result	Ref.
1	2019	Taiwan Swinging Skirts LPGA	(Australia) Minjee Lee; (Germany) Caroline Masson	Won with birdie on first extra hole	
2	2020	ANA Inspiration	(Canada) Brooke Henderson; (South Korea) Mirim Lee	Lee won with birdie on first extra hole	
3	2021	Pelican Women's Championship	(South Korea) Kim Sei-young; (New Zealand) Lydia Ko; (United States) Lexi Thompson	Won with birdie on first extra hole	
4	2022	Meijer LPGA Classic	(United States) Jennifer Kupcho; (Republic of Ireland) Leona Maguire	Kupcho won with a birdie on the second extra hole; Korda eliminated by birdie on first hole	
5	2024	LPGA Drive On Championship	(New Zealand) Lydia Ko	Won with a par on second extra hole	
6	2024	Fir Hills Seri Pak Championship	(United States) Ryann O'Toole	Won with a birdie on first extra hole	

=== Ladies European Tour wins (3) ===
#	Date	Tournament	Winning score	To par	Margin of victory	Runner-up	Winner's share (€)	Ref.
1	Sep 22, 2019	Lacoste Ladies Open de France	68-64-70-67=269	−15	8 strokes	(France) Céline Boutier	48,750	
2	Aug 20, 2022	Aramco Team Series – Sotogrande	67-69-67=203	−13	3 strokes	(United States) Jessica Korda (Spain) Ana Peláez (France) Pauline Roussin	73,955	
3	Jul 16, 2023	Aramco Team Series – London	68-69-71=208	−11	4 strokes	(England) Charley Hull	75,000	

=== Symetra Tour wins (1) ===
#	Date	Tournament	Winning score	To par	Margin of victory	Runner-up	Winner's share ($)	Ref.
1	Sep 4, 2016	Sioux Falls GreatLIFE Challenge	68-67-69-66=270	−14	3 strokes	(Thailand) Wichanee Meechai	31,500	

=== Other wins (1) ===
#	Date	Tournament	Winning score	To par	Margin of victory	Runner-up	Ref.
1	Aug 7, 2021	Olympic Games	67-62-69-69=267	−17	1 stroke	(Japan) Mone Inami	

== Major championships ==
=== Wins (4) ===
Year	Championship	54 holes	Winning score	Margin	Runner(s)-up
2021	Women's PGA Championship	Tied for lead	−19 (70-63-68-68=269)	3 strokes	(United States) Lizette Salas
2024	Chevron Championship	1 shot deficit	−13 (68-69-69-69=275)	2 strokes	(Sweden) Maja Stark
2026	Chevron Championship (2)	5 shot lead	−18 (65-65-70-70=270)	5 strokes	(Thailand) Patty Tavatanakit, (China) Yin Ruoning
2026	U.S. Women's Open	Tied for lead	−8 (73-67-67-69=276)	1 stroke	(England) Charley Hull, (Mexico) Gaby López

=== Results timeline ===
Results not in chronological order.

Tournament	2013	2014	2015	2016	2017	2018	2019	2020	2021	2022	2023	2024	2025	2026
Chevron Championship		CUT	CUT		T42	T13	T52	T2	T3		3	1	T14	1
U.S. Women's Open	T64			T59	T44	T10	T39	CUT	CUT	T8	T64	CUT	T2	1
Women's PGA Championship					T20	T40	T3	WD	1	T30	CUT	CUT	T19	T8
The Evian Championship					CUT	T61	T25	NT	T19	T8	T9	T26	T43	CUT
Women's British Open					CUT	T42	T9	T14	T13	T41	T11	T2	T36	T4

Win
Top 10
Did not play

CUT = missed the half-way cut
WD = withdrew
NT = no tournament
T = tied

=== Summary ===
Tournament	Wins	2nd	3rd	Top-5	Top-10	Top-25	Events	Cuts made
Chevron Championship	2	1	2	5	5	7	11	9
U.S. Women's Open	1	1	0	2	4	4	12	9
Women's PGA Championship	1	0	1	2	3	5	10	7
The Evian Championship	0	0	0	0	2	4	9	7
Women's British Open	0	1	0	2	3	6	10	9
Totals	4	3	3	11	17	26	52	41

- Most consecutive cuts made – 10 (three times)
- Longest streak of top-10s – 3 (2026 Chevron – 2026 Women's LPGA)

== LPGA Tour career summary ==
Year	Tournaments played	Cuts made (Note: Includes matchplay and other tournaments without a cut.)	Wins (Majors)	2nd	3rd	Top 10s	Best finish	Earnings (US$)	Money list rank	Scoring average	Scoring rank
2013	1	1	0	0	0	0	T64	—N/a	—N/a	77.50	—N/a
2014	1	0	0	0	0	0	CUT	—N/a	—N/a	78.50	—N/a
2015	1	0	0	0	0	0	CUT	—N/a	—N/a	75.50	—N/a
2016	1	1	0	0	0	0	T59	—N/a	—N/a	74.50	—N/a
2017	23	19	0	0	0	5	T5	442,068	47	70.61	27
2018	22	18	1	2	0	7	1	1,055,046	13	70.62	22
2019	20	19	2	1	3	12	1	1,665,546	5	69.64	4
2020	12	10	0	1	1	4	T2	575,894	14	70.27	7
2021	17	16	4 (1)	1	2	10	1	2,382,198	2	68.77	1
2022	15	13	1	2	0	8	1	1,418,725	12	69.66	6
2023	18	16	0	1	1	9	2	1,397,796	20	69.85	5
2024	16	13	7 (1)	1	0	11	1	4,391,930	2	69.56	2
2025	19	19	0	2	1	9	2/T2	2,780,355	5	69.44	2
2026	13	12	4 (2)	3	0	10	1	6,178,125	1	69.18	1
Totals (Note: Official as of 2025 season) (since 2017)	175	155	19 (4)	14	8	85	1	22,287,683	3	69.802	2

== World ranking ==
Position in Women's World Golf Rankings at the end of each calendar year.

Year	World ranking	Source
2013	626	
2014	822	
2015	n/a	
2016	341	
2017	73	
2018	23	
2019	3	
2020	4	
2021	1	
2022	2	
2023	5	
2024	1	
2025	2	

== U.S. national team appearances ==
Amateur

- Junior Solheim Cup: 2015 (winners)

Professional

- Solheim Cup: 2019, 2021, 2023, 2024 (winners), 2026
- International Crown: 2023

=== Solheim Cup record ===
Year	Total matches	Total W–L–H	Singles W–L–H	Foursomes W–L–H	Fourballs W–L–H	Points won	Points %
Career	20	12–6–2	3–2–0	7–3–0	2–1–2	13	65
2019	4	3–0–1	1–0–0 def. C. Hedwall 2 up	2–0–0 won w/ J. Korda 6&4 won w/ J. Korda 6&5	0–0–1 halved w/ B. Altomare	3.5	87.5
2021	4	2–2–0	1–0–0 def. G. Hall 1 up	0–2–0 lost w/ J. Korda 6&4 lost w/ A. Ewing 5&4	1–0–0 won w/ A. Ewing 1 up	2.0	50.0
2023	4	2–2–0	0–1–0 lost to C. Ciganda 2&1	2–0–0 won w/ A. Corpuz 1 up won w/ A. Corpuz 5&3	0–1–0 lost w/ A. Ewing 4&3	2.0	50.0
2024	4	3–1–0	0–1–0 lost to C. Hull 6&4	2–0–0 won w/ A. Corpuz 3&2 won w/ A. Corpuz 1 up	1–0–0 won w/ M. Khang 6&4	3.0	75.0
2026	4	2–1–1	1–0–0 def. M.Rhodes 4&2	1–1–0 won w/ A.Corpuz 4&3 lost w/ A.Corpuz 3&2	0–0–1 halved w/ L.Coughlin	2.5	62.5

== See also ==
- Chronological list of LPGA major golf champions
- List of LPGA major championship winning golfers
- List of golfers with most LPGA Tour wins
