= LPGA Drive On Championship =

Golf tournament

Tournament information
- Location: Bradenton, Florida, U.S.
- Established: 2020
- Course: Bradenton Country Club
- Par: 71
- Length: 6,557 yards (5,996 m)
- Tour: LPGA Tour
- Format: Stroke play – 72 holes
- Prize fund: $1.75 million
- Month played: January

Tournament record score
- Aggregate: 268 Céline Boutier (2023)
- To par: −20 as above

Final champion
- (United States) Nelly Korda
- Location in the United States Location in Florida

The LPGA Drive On Championship was a series of women's professional golf tournaments on the LPGA Tour created after several tournaments were cancelled as a result of the COVID-19 pandemic. Each tournament used the tour's "Drive On" slogan to support the resilience of the tour.

== Ohio ==
The Ohio tournament was held in July 2020 as the LPGA Tour's first tournament since the tour was halted in February 2020.

The Ohio tournament was hosted at the Inverness Club in Toledo, Ohio. The tournament did not have spectators nor a pro-am, and it featured a field of 144 players. Although lacking a title sponsor, the players competed for a $1 million purse, primarily funded by sponsors of cancelled tournaments. Danielle Kang won the inaugural event by one stroke over Céline Boutier.

== Georgia ==
The Georgia tournament was announced on September 15, 2020, as the LPGA replaced all three stops (Korea, Taiwan, Japan) on the Asian Swing that were called off by further pandemic restrictions.

The Georgia tournament was hosted at the Reynolds Lake Oconee Great Waters Course in Greensboro, Georgia, located halfway between Augusta and Atlanta, on a Jack Nicklaus-designed course that opened in 1992 and was refurbished in 2019. The tournament used a full field of 144 players, competing for a $1.3 million purse. Ally McDonald won her first career tournament by one stroke over Danielle Kang, who was going for the "Drive On Championship" double.

== Florida ==
The first Florida tournament was held in March 2021 at the Golden Ocala Golf Club in Ocala, Florida. Austin Ernst won by five strokes over Jennifer Kupcho. In February 2022 at Crown Colony Golf Club in Fort Myers, Florida, Leona Maguire became the first Irish winner on the LPGA tour, finishing 3 strokes clear of Lexi Thompson. The second Florida tournament was held in January 2024 at the Bradenton Country Club in Bradenton, Florida.

== Arizona ==
The first Arizona tournament was held in March 2023 at the Superstition Mountain Golf & Country Club in Gold Canyon, Arizona. The 132-player field competed for a higher purse, $1.75 million, with $262,500 going to the winner.

== Winners ==
| Year | Date | Venue | Champion | Country | Winning score | To par | Margin of victory | Purse ($) | Winner's share ($) |
|---|---|---|---|---|---|---|---|---|---|
| 2024 | Jan 28 | Bradenton Country Club | Nelly Korda | United States | 65-67-68-73=273 | −11 | Playoff | 1,750,000 | 262,500 |
| 2023 | Mar 26 | Superstition Mountain Golf & Country Club | Céline Boutier | France | 69-66-65-68=268 | −20 | Playoff | 1,750,000 | 262,500 |
| 2022 | Feb 5 | Crown Colony GC | Leona Maguire | Ireland | 66-65-67=198 | −18 | 3 strokes | 1,500,000 | 225,000 |
| 2021 | Mar 7 | Golden Ocala GC | Austin Ernst | United States | 67-67-69-70=273 | −15 | 5 strokes | 1,500,000 | 225,000 |
| 2020 | Oct 25 | Lake Oconee | Ally McDonald | United States | 66-68-69-69=272 | −16 | 1 stroke | 1,300,000 | 195,000 |
| 2020 | Aug 2 | Inverness | Danielle Kang | United States | 66-73-70=209 | −7 | 1 stroke | 1,000,000 | 150,000 |
