= Buick LPGA Shanghai =

Golf tournaqment

Coordinates: 31.1047°N 121.2217°E

Tournament information
- Location: Shanghai, China
- Established: 2018
- Course: Sheshan Golf Club
- Par: 72
- Length: 6,735 yards (6,158 m)
- Tours: LPGA Tour; China LPGA Tour
- Format: Stroke play – 72 holes
- Prize fund: $3.2 million
- Month played: October

Tournament record score
- Aggregate: 263 Yin Ruoning (2024)
- To par: −25 as above

Current champion
- (China) Yin Ruoning

Location in China

The Buick LPGA Shanghai is a women's professional golf tournament in China co-sanctioned by the LPGA Tour and the China LPGA Tour. It debuted in October 2018 at Qizhong Garden Golf Club in Shanghai.

Danielle Kang won the inaugural event by two strokes over seven golfers. Kang repeated as champion in 2019. After three years of cancellation due to the COVID-19 pandemic and travel restrictions, the tournament resumed in 2023.

== Winners ==
Year	Date	Champion	Country	Winning score	To par	Margin of victory	Purse ($)	Winner's share ($)
2026	18 Oct	Yin Ruoning	China	68-74-67-68=274	−11	1 stroke	3,200,000	480,000
2025	12 Oct	Jeeno Thitikul	Thailand	65-70-66-63=264	−24	Playoff	2,200,000	330,000
2024	13 Oct	Yin Ruoning	China	70-66-63-64=263	−25	6 strokes	2,100,000	315,000
2023	15 Oct	Angel Yin	United States	70-69-65-70=274	−14	Playoff	2,100,000	315,000
2022	16 Oct	Cancelled					2,100,000	315,000
2021	17 Oct	Cancelled					2,100,000	315,000
2020	18 Oct	Cancelled					2,100,000	315,000
2019	20 Oct	Danielle Kang (2)	United States	69-67-66-70=272	−16	1 stroke	2,100,000	315,000
2018	21 Oct	Danielle Kang	United States	67-68-71-69=275	−13	2 strokes	2,100,000	315,000

== Tournament records ==
Year	Player	Score	Round
2025	Minami Katsu	61 (−11)	2nd
