= Kroger Queen City Championship =

Golf tournament

Kroger Queen City Championship Presented by P&G

Tournament information
- Location: Cincinnati, Ohio, U.S.
- Established: 2022
- Course: Maketewah Country Club
- Par: 72
- Length: 6,705 yards (6,131 m)
- Tour: LPGA Tour
- Format: Stroke play – 72 holes
- Prize fund: $2.0 million
- Month played: May

Tournament record score
- Aggregate: 265 Lydia Ko (2024)
- To par: −23 as above

Current champion
- (England) Lottie Woad

Location map
- Location in the United States Location in Ohio

The Kroger Queen City Championship Presented By P&G, is a women's professional golf tournament on the LPGA Tour. It was founded in 2022 in Cincinnati, Ohio. The tournament is televised by the Golf Channel.

Ally Ewing won the inaugural event with a final round 66 that included five straight birdies on the back-nine. It was the first time in over 30 years that an LPGA Tour event was played in southwest Ohio. The tournament increased its purse from $1.75 million to $2.0 million on May 16, 2023.

Minjee Lee won the 2023 tournament by shooting a −16 and beating Charley Hull in a playoff.

The Kenwood Country Club was the original host and last welcomed the tournament in 2023 to facilitate course improvements. TPC River's Bend in Hamilton Township was selected as the tournament's venue for 2024–2025. Starting in 2026, the tournament timing has been changed from September to May, and the Donald Ross-designed Maketewah Country Club in Cincinnati was announced as the new host. Lottie Woad won the 2026 event.

Afterwards, Kroger and Proctor and Gamble withdrew their sponsorships. The LPGA announced it will not have a tournament in Cincinnati in 2027

== Winners ==
Year	Date	Champion	Country	Winning score	To par	Margin of victory	Purse ($)	Winner's share ($)
2025	Sep 14	Charley Hull	England	68-65-67-68=268	–20	1 stroke	2,000,000	300,000
2024	Sep 22	Lydia Ko	New Zealand	67-66-69-63=265	−23	5 strokes	2,000,000	300,000
2023	Sep 10	Minjee Lee	Australia	67-69-65-71=272	−16	Playoff	2,000,000	300,000
2022	Sep 11	Ally Ewing	United States	69-64-67-66=266	−22	1 stroke	1,750,000	262,500

== Tournament records ==
Year	Player	Score	To par	Round
2022	Lee Jeong-eun	63	−9	2nd
2023	Nasa Hataoka	63	–9	2nd
2024	Lydia Ko	63	–9	4th
2025	Chanettee Wannasaen	63	−9	1st
