= Sioux Falls GreatLIFE Challenge =

Golf tournament in South Dakota

Tournament information
- Location: Sioux Falls, South Dakota
- Established: 2015
- Course: Willow Run Golf Club
- Par: 70
- Tour: Symetra Tour
- Format: Stroke play
- Prize fund: $225,000
- Month played: September
- Final year: 2019

Tournament record score
- Aggregate: 267 Patty Tavatanakit (2019)
- To par: −14 Nelly Korda (2016)

Current champion
- (Thailand) Patty Tavatanakit

The Sioux Falls GreatLIFE Challenge was a tournament on the Symetra Tour, the LPGA's developmental tour. It was part of the Symetra Tour's schedule between 2015 and 2019. It was held at Willow Run Golf Club in Sioux Falls, South Dakota.

== Winners ==
Year	Date	Winner	Country	Score	Margin of victory	Runner(s)-up	Purse ($)	Winner's share ($)
2019	Sep 1	Patty Tavatanakit	Thailand	267 (−13)	Playoff	(South Korea) Yujeong Son	225,000	33,750
2018	Sep 2	Linnea Ström	Sweden	269 (−11)	1 stroke	(New Zealand) Charlotte Thomas	210,000	31,500
2017	Sep 3	Céline Boutier	France	273 (−11)	1 stroke	(Thailand) Benyapa Niphatsophon	210,000	31,500
2016	Sep 4	Nelly Korda	United States	270 (−14)	3 strokes	(Thailand) Wichanee Meechai	210,000	31,500
2015	Sep 6	Caroline Westrup	Norway	272 (−12)	2 strokes	(Sweden) Daniela Holmqvist	210,000	31,500
