= Danielle Kang =

American professional golfer (born 1992)

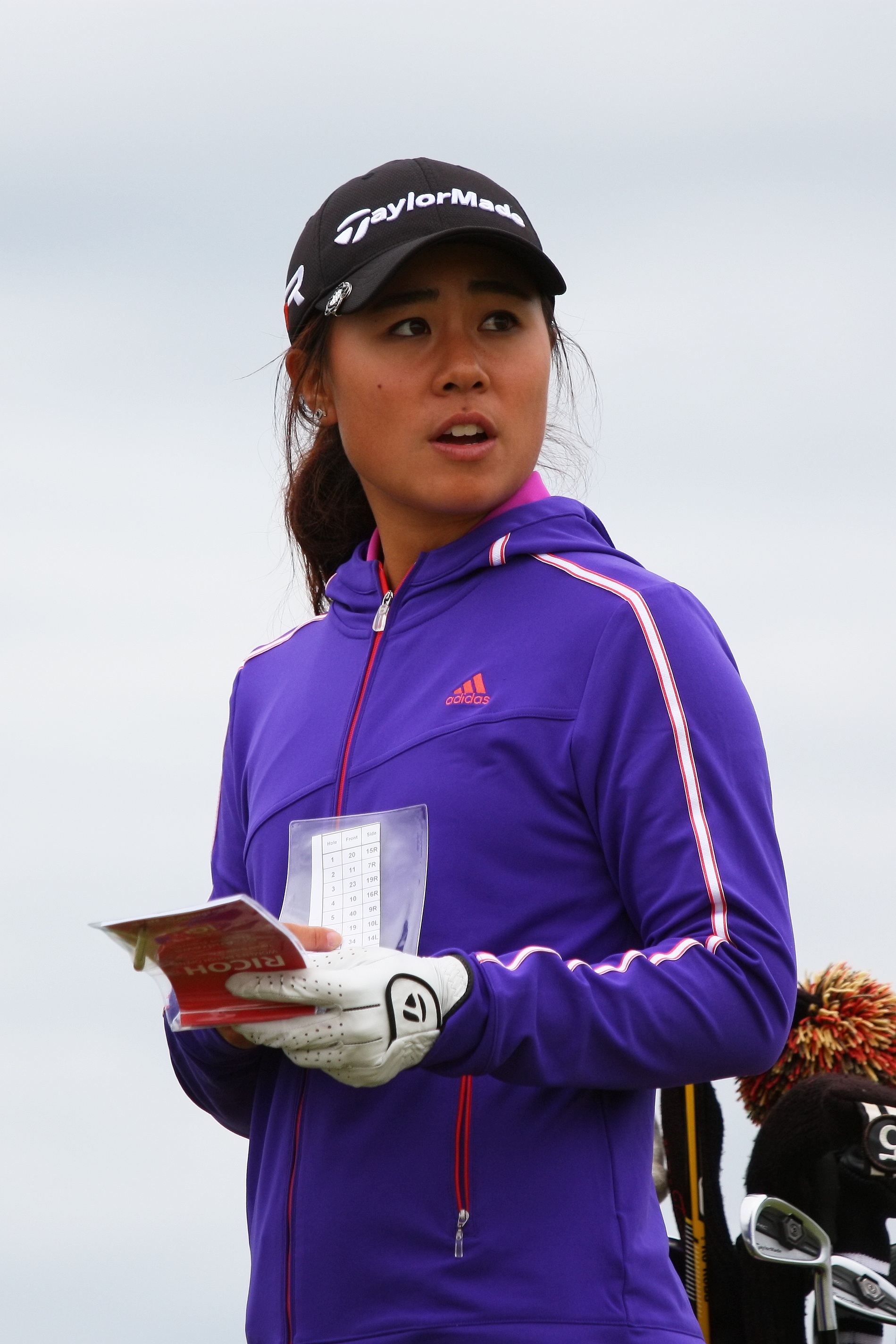
- Kang at the 2013 Women's British Open

Personal information
- Full name: Danielle Grace Kang
- Nationality: United States
- Born: October 20, 1992 (age 34) San Francisco, California, U.S.
- Height: 5 ft 6 in (168 cm)

Career
- Sport: Golf
- College: Pepperdine University (two years)
- Turned professional: 2011
- Current tour: LPGA Tour (joined 2012)
- Professional wins: 6

Number of wins by tour
- LPGA Tour: 6

Best results in LPGA major championships (wins: 1)
- Chevron Championship: T6: 2019
- Women's PGA C'ship: Won: 2017
- U.S. Women's Open: 4th: 2018
- Women's British Open: T32: 2020
- Evian Championship: T18: 2017

Achievements and awards
- LPGA Vare Trophy: 2020

Danielle Grace Kang (born October 20, 1992) is an American professional golfer currently playing on the LPGA Tour. As an amateur, she won the U.S. Women's Amateur twice, in 2010 and 2011. She won the 2017 KPMG Women's PGA Championship, an LPGA major.

== Early life, college and amateur career ==
Kang was born on October 20, 1992, in San Francisco. She grew up in Southern California, and qualified for the U.S. Women's Open as a 14-year-old in 2007. She began high school at Oak Park High School and later transferred to Westlake High School early to begin college at Pepperdine University in Malibu in the spring of 2010. Kang played extensively as a junior golfer with the Southern California PGA Junior Tour alongside fellow SCPGA alumni such as Lizette Salas and Brianna Do.

Kang played on the Pepperdine golf team through the regular season in the spring of 2011. She was ruled academically ineligible to compete in the 2011 NCAA post-season and stated that she was not disappointed because "Pepperdine is in the past for me. I'm focusing on the future. Turning pro after the U.S. Women's Amateur."

Kang won the U.S. Women's Amateur in 2010 and competed in all four majors as an amateur in 2011. She made the cut in three of the majors, including the LPGA Championship, where she was the only non-professional in the field. Kang was the low amateur at the Women's British Open, finishing in a tie for 49th place. She repeated her win at the U.S. Women's Amateur in 2011 in August to become the first player in 15 years to win consecutive titles.

== Professional career ==
Kang played her first tournament as a professional at the Walmart NW Arkansas Championship, in September 2011. She entered on a sponsor's exemption and missed the cut. Kang entered the 2011 LPGA Qualifying School. She survived Stage II, shooting +5 (73-74-71-75=293), just inside the cut line to qualify for the final stage. She finished the final stage, Stage III, of Q-School tied for 39th. This gave her conditional status (Priority List Category 20) on the LPGA Tour for 2012

Kang played 19 events on the LPGA Tour in 2012, making 13 cuts and finishing the season with $239,184 in earnings, putting her 52nd on the official LPGA season-ending money list. This qualified her for full status on the LPGA Tour in 2013.

Kang earned her first LPGA Tour win, 2017 KPMG Women's PGA Championship, in her 144th LPGA Tour start. On October 21, 2018, Kang won the inaugural Buick LPGA Shanghai tournament by two strokes to earn her second career victory. The tournament was held at Qizhong Garden Golf Club in Shanghai, China. In October 2019, Kang repeated as champion of the Buick LPGA Shanghai.

On August 2, 2020, Kang won the LPGA Drive On Championship at Inverness Club in Ohio. This was the LPGA's first tournament back after a six-month hiatus due to the COVID-19 pandemic. One week later, Kang won her 5th LPGA Tour event at the Marathon Classic.

Kang won the 2020 Vare Trophy for lowest scoring average on the LPGA Tour.

On January 23, 2022, Kang won the Hilton Grand Vacations Tournament of Champions at Lake Nona Golf & Country Club in Orlando, Florida.

Kang narrowly missed a rare back-to-back wins starting a new LPGA season, when her longtime friend Lydia Ko beat her by one stroke in the January 27–30 Gainbridge LPGA at Boca Rio tournament. They were tied at 12-under after the 14th hole in the fourth round, when Ko made a birdie at the 15th to take the lead, and both birdied the 16th; then both parred the final two holes. She earned $184,255 to Ko's $300,000.

Kang stopped playing on the tour after announcing at the end of the 2022 U.S. Women's Open on June 5, she had a tumor on her spine. She returned to competition at the CP Women's Open on August 25, after treatment.

== Personal life ==
Kang is a Korean-American born to South Korean parents K.S. Kang and Grace Lee. Her brother Alex played golf for San Diego State. In 2018, she began a relationship with professional golfer Maverick McNealy, who also lives in Las Vegas, but this relationship ended in 2021.

== Professional wins (6) ==
=== LPGA Tour wins (6) ===
Legend
LPGA Tour major championships (1)
Other LPGA Tour (5)

No.	Date	Tournament	Winning score	To par	Margin of victory	Runner(s)-up
1	Jul 2, 2017	KPMG Women's PGA Championship	69-66-68-68=271	−13	1 stroke	(Canada) Brooke Henderson
2	Oct 21, 2018	Buick LPGA Shanghai	67-68-71-69=275	−13	2 strokes	(United States) Marina Alex (United States) Brittany Altomare (Thailand) Ariya Jutanugarn (South Korea) Kim Sei-young (New Zealand) Lydia Ko (China) Liu Wenbo (United States) Annie Park
3	Oct 20, 2019	Buick LPGA Shanghai (2)	69-67-66-70=272	−16	1 stroke	(United States) Jessica Korda
4	Aug 2, 2020	LPGA Drive On Championship	66-73-70=209	−7	1 stroke	(France) Céline Boutier
5	Aug 9, 2020	Marathon Classic	64-67-70-68=269	−15	1 stroke	(England) Jodi Ewart Shadoff (New Zealand) Lydia Ko
6	Jan 23, 2022	Hilton Grand Vacations Tournament of Champions	68-67-69-68=272	−16	3 strokes	(Canada) Brooke Henderson

LPGA Tour playoff record (0–3)

No.	Year	Tournament	Opponent	Result
1	2019	BMW Ladies Championship	(South Korea) Jang Ha-na	Lost to birdie on third extra hole
2	2021	Diamond Resorts Tournament of Champions	(United States) Jessica Korda	Lost to birdie on first extra hole
3	2022	Walmart NW Arkansas Championship	(Thailand) Atthaya Thitikul	Lost to birdie on second extra hole

== Major championships ==
=== Wins (1) ===
Year	Championship	54 holes	Winning score	Margin	Runner-up
2017	Women's PGA Championship	Tied for lead	−13 (69-66-68-68=271)	1 stroke	(Canada) Brooke Henderson

=== Results timeline ===
Results not in chronological order.

Tournament	2007	2008	2009	2010	2011	2012	2013	2014	2015	2016	2017	2018	2019	2020
Chevron Championship					CUT		CUT	T61	T26	T26	T47	CUT	T6	T11
Women's PGA Championship					T50	CUT	T22	T25	CUT	T46	1	T33	T5	T33
U.S. Women's Open	CUT			64	T68	T14	CUT	T59	T47	T17	CUT	4	CUT	T52
The Evian Championship ^							T31	CUT	T59	T30	T18	CUT	CUT	NT
Women's British Open					T49	CUT	T42	CUT	T56	CUT	CUT	CUT	T41	T32

Tournament	2021	2022	2023	2024	2025	2026
Chevron Championship	13	T17	T28	CUT		
U.S. Women's Open	T35	T63	CUT	T51		CUT
Women's PGA Championship	T5		T39	CUT	CUT	CUT
The Evian Championship			CUT			
Women's British Open	CUT		T69			

^ The Evian Championship was added as a major in 2013.

Win
Top 10
Did not play

CUT = missed the half-way cut
NT = no tournament
T = tied

=== Summary ===
Tournament	Wins	2nd	3rd	Top-5	Top-10	Top-25	Events	Cuts made
Chevron Championship	0	0	0	0	1	4	13	9
U.S. Women's Open	0	0	0	1	1	3	17	11
Women's PGA Championship	1	0	0	3	3	5	15	10
The Evian Championship	0	0	0	0	0	1	8	4
Women's British Open	0	0	0	0	0	0	12	6
Totals	1	0	0	4	5	13	65	40

- Most consecutive cuts made – 7 (2020 ANA – 2021 WPGA)
- Longest streak of top-10s – 1 (five times)

== LPGA Tour career summary ==
Year	Tournaments played	Cuts made*	Wins	2nd	3rd	Top 10s	Best finish	Earnings ($)	Money list rank	Scoring average	Scoring rank
2007	1	0	0	0	0	0	MC	n/a	n/a	n/a	n/a
2011	5	3	0	0	0	0	T49	0	n/a	n/a	n/a
2012	19	13	0	0	1	1	T3	239,184	52	72.39	50
2013	24	17	0	0	0	1	T5	221,649	57	72.18	54
2014	27	21	0	0	0	2	T5	316,239	51	72.46	82
2015	26	23	0	0	0	1	T5	292,579	62	71.72	44
2016	27	23	0	0	0	3	T4	505,316	36	71.12	31
2017	25	16	1	1	0	6	1	1,005,983	17	71.05	42
2018	25	15	1	1	1	8	1	1,135,441	11	70.85	27
2019	21	17	1	3	1	11	1	1,511,443	9	70.07	13
2020	13	13	2	1	1	5	1	897,872	4	70.08	4
2021	21	19	0	1	0	9	2	902,244	18	69.83	10
2022	18	16	1	2	1	7	1	1,039,239	25	69.72	9
2023	20	16	0	0	1	3	T3	459,154	61	71.47	73
2024	19	9	0	0	0	0	T20	82,043	143	73.52	157
2025	18	6	0	0	0	0	T54	15,272	168	73.88	151
Totals^	309	227	6	9	6	57	1	8,623,658	39		

^ Official as of 2025 season
* Includes matchplay and other events without a cut.

== World ranking ==
Position in Women's World Golf Rankings at the end of each calendar year.

Year	Ranking	Source
2010	404	
2011	341	
2012	106	
2013	97	
2014	111	
2015	98	
2016	68	
2017	21	
2018	18	
2019	4	
2020	5	
2021	11	
2022	16	
2023	48	
2024	263	
2025	604	

== U.S. national team appearances ==
Amateur

- Espirito Santo Trophy: 2010

Professional

- Solheim Cup: 2017 (winners), 2019, 2021, 2023
- International Crown: 2023

=== Solheim Cup record ===
Year	Total matches	Total W–L–H	Singles W–L–H	Foursomes W–L–H	Fourballs W–L–H	Points won	Points %
Career	16	7–9–0	2–2–0	3–4–0	2–3–0	7	43.8
2017	4	3–1–0	1–0–0 def. E. Pedersen 3&1	1–1–0 won w/ L. Salas 1 up, lost w/ M. Wie 2&1	1–0–0 won w/ M. Wie 3&1	3	75.0
2019	4	1–3–0	0–1–0 lost to C. Ciganda 1 up	0–1–0 lost w/ M. Khang 4&3	1–1–0 lost w/ L. Salas 4&2, won w/ L. Salas 2&1	1	25.0
2021	4	1–3–0	0–1–0 lost to E. Pedersen 1 dn	1–1–0 lost w/ A. Ernst 1 dn won w/ A. Ernst 1 up	0–1–0 lost w/ A. Ernst 3&2	1	25.0
2023	4	2-2-0	1-0-0 def. C. Hull 4&2	1-1-0 won w/ A. Lee 1 up lost w/ A. Lee 1 dn	0-1-0 lost w/ L. Vu 2&1	2	50.0
