= Fir Hills Seri Pak Championship =

Women's professional golf tournament

Coordinates: 34.0772°N 118.3275°W

Tournament information
- Location: Los Angeles, California, U.S.
- Established: 2018
- Courses: Wilshire Country Club (2018–2022); Palos Verdes Golf Club (2023–2024)
- Par: 71
- Length: 6,447 yards (5,895 m)
- Tour: LPGA Tour
- Format: Stroke play – 72 holes
- Prize fund: $2.0 million
- Month played: March
- Final year: 2024

Tournament record score
- Aggregate: 268 Brooke Henderson (2021)
- To par: −16 as above

Final champion
- (United States) Nelly Korda

Location in the United States
Location in California

The Fir Hills Seri Pak Championship was a women's professional golf tournament held in Los Angeles, California, United States as part of the LPGA Tour. A new event in 2018, it was played at Wilshire Country Club.

In Hancock Park, south of Hollywood and six miles (10 km) northwest of downtown, Wilshire was founded 107 years ago in 1919 and hosted the Los Angeles Open on the PGA Tour four times.

In 2023, the tournament moved to Palos Verdes Golf Club in Los Angeles and the purse increased to $1,750,000.

== Tournament names ==
- 2018: Hugel-JTBC LA Open
- 2019–2021: Hugel-Air Premia LA Open
- 2022–2023: DIO Implant LA Open
- 2024: Fir Hills Seri Pak Championship

== Winners ==
Year	Date	Champion	Country	Winning score	To par	Margin of victory	Purse ($)	Winner's share ($)
2024	Mar 24	Nelly Korda	United States	275	−9	Playoff	2,000,000	300,000
2023	Apr 2	Yin Ruoning	China	269	−15	1 stroke	1,750,000	262,500
2022	Apr 24	Nasa Hataoka	Japan	269	−15	5 strokes	1,500,000	225,000
2021	Apr 24	Brooke Henderson	Canada	268	−16	1 stroke	1,500,000	225,000
2020	Tournament canceled due to coronavirus pandemic							
2019	Apr 28	Minjee Lee	Australia	270	−14	4 strokes	1,500,000	225,000
2018	Apr 22	Moriya Jutanugarn	Thailand	272	−12	2 strokes	1,500,000	225,000

== Tournament records ==
Year	Player	Score	Round
2023	Georgia Hall	62 (−9)	3rd
