= Bank of Hope LPGA Match-Play =

Golf tournament

Coordinates: 33.685°N 111.964°W

T-Mobile Match Play
Tournament information
- Location: Las Vegas, Nevada
- Established: 2021
- Course: Shadow Creek Golf Course
- Par: 72
- Length: 6,765 yd (6,186 m)
- Tour: LPGA Tour
- Format: Match play
- Prize fund: $2.0 million
- Final year: 2025

Final champion
- (Sweden) Madelene Sagström

The T-Mobile Match Play was a women's professional golf tournament on the LPGA Tour in Las Vegas, Nevada. It debuted on the LPGA Tour in 2021 at the Shadow Creek Golf Course as the only match play tournament on the schedule. The event was last played in 2025.

The initial title sponsor of the tournament was Bank of Hope, a Los Angeles–based Asian-American bank in the United States. Bank of Hope previously sponsored the LPGA Founders Cup from 2017 to 2019. From 2024 to 2025, the title sponsor was T-Mobile.

This was the first match play tournament on the LPGA Tour since the Lorena Ochoa Invitational in 2017.

Ally Ewing won the inaugural event.

== Tournament names ==
- 2021–2023: Bank of Hope LPGA Match-Play
- 2024–2025: T-Mobile Match Play presented by MGM Rewards

== Winners ==
Year	Dates	Champion	Runner-up	Margin of victory	Purse ($)	Winner's share ($)
2025	Apr 2–6	(Sweden) Madelene Sagström	(United States) Lauren Coughlin	1 up	2,000,000	300,000
2024	Apr 3–7	(United States) Nelly Korda	(Republic of Ireland) Leona Maguire	4 and 3	2,000,000	300,000
2023	May 24–28	(Thailand) Pajaree Anannarukarn	(Japan) Ayaka Furue	3 and 1	1,500,000	225,000
2022	May 25–29	(South Korea) Ji Eun-hee	(Japan) Ayaka Furue	3 and 2	1,500,000	225,000
2021	May 26–30	(United States) Ally Ewing	(Germany) Sophia Popov	2 and 1	1,500,000	225,000
