= Windsor Golf Classic =

Golf tournament in California

Tournament information
- Location: Windsor, California
- Established: 2019
- Course: Windsor Golf Club
- Par: 72
- Tour: Symetra Tour
- Format: Stroke play
- Prize fund: $150,000
- Month played: April
- Final year: 2020

Final champion
- (Republic of Ireland) Leona Maguire

The Windsor Golf Classic was a tournament on the Symetra Tour, the LPGA's developmental tour. It was a part of the Symetra Tour's schedule between 2019 and 2020. It was held at Windsor Golf Club in Windsor, California.

In 2019, Ireland's Leona Maguire clinched her maiden professional win in a playoff with Pajaree Anannarukarn.

The tournament in 2020 was cancelled due to the COVID-19 pandemic.

== Winners ==
| Year | Date | Winner | Country | Score | Margin of victory | Runner-up | Purse ($) | Winner's share ($) |
|---|---|---|---|---|---|---|---|---|
| 2020 | Apr 2–4 | Tournament cancelled | | | | | 150,000 | 22,500 |
| 2019 | Apr 5–7 | Leona Maguire | Ireland | 204 (−12) | Playoff | (Thailand) Pajaree Anannarukarn | 150,000 | 22,500 |
