= 2021 LPGA Tour =

Professional women's golf tour

2021 LPGA Tour season
- Duration: January 21, 2021 – November 21, 2021
- Number of official events: 30 (5 cancelled)
- Most wins: 5 (South Korea) Ko Jin-young
- Race to CME Globe Winner: (South Korea) Ko Jin-young
- Money leader: (South Korea) Ko Jin-young
- Vare Trophy: (New Zealand) Lydia Ko
- Rolex Player of the Year: (South Korea) Ko Jin-young
- Rookie of the Year: (Thailand) Patty Tavatanakit

The 2021 LPGA Tour was the 72nd edition of the LPGA Tour, a series of professional golf tournaments for elite female golfers from around the world. The season began at the Four Season Golf Club in Lake Buena Vista, Florida on January 21 and ended on November 21 at the Tiburón Golf Club in Naples, Florida. The tournaments were sanctioned by the United States–based Ladies Professional Golf Association (LPGA).

== Schedule and results ==
The number in parentheses after each winners' name is the player's total number of wins in official money individual events on the LPGA Tour, including that event. Tournament and winner names in bold indicate LPGA majors. The schedule and purse amount for each tournament is listed on the LPGA website. The LPGA has a standard formula for payout percentages and distribution of its purse and prize money for every event. The winner typically gets 15% of the total, second place gets 9.3%, third place 6.75%, etc.

With the $1.3 million increase in the total prize fund for the 2021 Women's British Open from $4.5 million to $5.8 million announced on August 18, if all remaining events are played, the present 2021 total prize money is now scheduled to be $73.3 million, the largest in its history. With the cancellation of the Toto Japan Classic, as the fifth canceled of the 35 originally scheduled, the total prize money to be won now drops to $69.2 million for the 30 played, $1 million fewer than in 2019. That 2019 total was $70.2 million in its 32 played tournaments. For 2021, the AIG Women's British Open has the largest total prize fund, but its winner's share of $870,000 is barely more than one-half of the CME Group Tour Championship that pays the winner $1.5 million, as it did in 2019, the largest ever in woman's golf.

Several events were postponed or canceled due to an ongoing COVID-19 pandemic.

Key

Major championships
Regular events
Team championships

Date	Tournament	Location	Winner	WWGR points	Purse ($)	Winner's share ($)
Jan 24	Diamond Resorts Tournament of Champions	Florida	(United States) Jessica Korda (6)	20.5	1,200,000	180,000
Feb 28	Gainbridge LPGA	Florida	(United States) Nelly Korda (4)	53	2,000,000	300,000
Mar 7	LPGA Drive On Championship	Florida	(United States) Austin Ernst (3)	53	1,500,000	225,000
Mar 28	Kia Classic	California	(South Korea) Inbee Park (21)	68	1,800,000	270,000
Apr 4	**ANA Inspiration**	California	(Thailand) **Patty Tavatanakit** (1)	100	3,100,000	465,000
Apr 17	Lotte Championship	Hawaii	(New Zealand) Lydia Ko (16)	53	2,000,000	300,000
Apr 24	Hugel-Air Premia LA Open	California	(Canada) Brooke Henderson (10)	62	1,500,000	225,000
May 2	HSBC Women's World Championship	Singapore	(South Korea) Kim Hyo-joo (4)	46	1,600,000	240,000
May 9	Honda LPGA Thailand	Thailand	(Thailand) Ariya Jutanugarn (11)	34	1,600,000	240,000
~~May 16~~	Blue Bay LPGA	China	Tournament canceled		~~2,100,000~~	–
May 23	Pure Silk Championship	Virginia	(Taiwan) Hsu Wei-ling (1)	31	1,300,000	195,000
May 30	Bank of Hope LPGA Match-Play	Nevada	(United States) Ally Ewing (2)	50	1,500,000	225,000
Jun 6	**U.S. Women's Open**	California	(Philippines) **Yuka Saso** (1)	100	5,500,000	1,000,000
Jun 13	LPGA Mediheal Championship	California	(Finland) Matilda Castren (1)	37	1,500,000	225,000
Jun 20	Meijer LPGA Classic	Michigan	(United States) Nelly Korda (5)	50	2,300,000	345,000
Jun 27	**KPMG Women's PGA Championship**	Georgia	(United States) **Nelly Korda** (6)	100	4,500,000	675,000
Jul 4	Volunteers of America Classic	Texas	(South Korea) Ko Jin-young (8)	24	1,500,000	225,000
Jul 11	Marathon Classic	Ohio	(Japan) Nasa Hataoka (4)	34	2,000,000	300,000
Jul 17	Dow Great Lakes Bay Invitational	Michigan	(Thailand) Ariya Jutanugarn (12) (Thailand) Moriya Jutanugarn (2)	n/a	2,300,000	279,500 (each)
Jul 25	**Evian Championship**	France	(Australia) **Minjee Lee** (6)	100	4,500,000	675,000
Aug 1	ISPS Handa World Invitational	Northern Ireland	(Thailand) Pajaree Anannarukarn (1)	18	1,500,000	225,000
Aug 15	Trust Golf Women's Scottish Open	Scotland	(United States) Ryann O'Toole (1)	37	1,500,000	225,000
Aug 22	**AIG Women's Open**	Scotland	(Sweden) **Anna Nordqvist** (9)	100	5,800,000	870,000
~~Aug 29~~	CP Women's Open	Canada	Tournament canceled		~~2,350,000~~	–
Sep 6	Solheim Cup	Ohio	Europe	n/a		
Sep 19	Cambia Portland Classic	Oregon	(South Korea) Ko Jin-young (9)	26	1,400,000	210,000
Sep 26	Walmart NW Arkansas Championship	Arkansas	(Japan) Nasa Hataoka (5)	50	2,300,000	345,000
Oct 3	ShopRite LPGA Classic	New Jersey	(France) Céline Boutier (2)	50	1,750,000	262,500
Oct 10	Cognizant Founders Cup	New Jersey	(South Korea) Ko Jin-young (10)	62	3,000,000	450,000
~~Oct 17~~	Buick LPGA Shanghai	China	Tournament canceled		~~2,100,000~~	–
Oct 24	BMW Ladies Championship	South Korea	(South Korea) Ko Jin-young (11)	40	2,000,000	300,000
~~Oct 31~~	Taiwan Swinging Skirts LPGA	Taiwan	Tournament canceled		~~2,200,000~~	–
~~Nov 7~~	Toto Japan Classic	Japan	Tournament removed from schedule		~~2,000,000~~	–
Nov 14	Pelican Women's Championship	Florida	(United States) Nelly Korda (7)	53	1,750,000	262,500
Nov 21	CME Group Tour Championship	Florida	(South Korea) Ko Jin-young (12)	56	5,000,000	1,500,000

=== Unofficial events ===
The following event appears on the schedule, but does not carry official money.

Date	Tournament	Host country	Winner	WWGR points
Aug 7	Olympic women's golf competition	Japan	(United States) Nelly Korda	37

== Statistics leaders ==
=== Money list leaders ===
Rank	Player	Events	Prize money ($)
1	(South Korea) Ko Jin-young	19	3,502,161
2	(United States) Nelly Korda	17	2,382,198
3	(Japan) Nasa Hataoka	21	1,901,081
4	(Australia) Minjee Lee	18	1,542,332
5	(New Zealand) Lydia Ko	20	1,530,629
6	(Philippines) Yuka Saso	10	1,517,876
7	(Thailand) Patty Tavatanakit	19	1,393,437
8	(Thailand) Ariya Jutanugarn	23	1,260,430
9	(Sweden) Anna Nordqvist	19	1,258,467
10	(United States) Lexi Thompson	19	1,254,423

Source and complete list: LPGA official website.

=== Scoring average ===
Rank	Player	Total strokes	Total rounds	Average
1	(United States) Nelly Korda	4,264	62	68.774
2	(South Korea) Ko Jin-young	4,614	67	68.866
3	(New Zealand) Lydia Ko	5,061	73	69.329
4	(Philippines) Yuka Saso	2,289	33	69.364
5	(South Korea) Inbee Park	4,033	58	69.534
6	(United States) Lexi Thompson	4,874	70	69.629
7	(South Korea) In Gee Chun	5,292	76	69.632
8	(United States) Jessica Korda	4,397	63	69.794
9	(Canada) Brooke Henderson	5,235	75	69.800
10	(United States) Danielle Kang	4,818	69	69.826

Source and complete list: LPGA official website.

== See also ==
- 2021 Ladies European Tour
- 2021 Symetra Tour
