= 2020 LPGA Tour =

Professional women's golf tour

2020 LPGA Tour season
- Duration: January 16, 2020 – December 20, 2020
- Number of official events: 18 (17 cancelled)
- Most wins: 2 (United States) Danielle Kang
- Race to CME Globe Winner: (South Korea) Inbee Park
- Money leader: (South Korea) Ko Jin-young
- Vare Trophy: (United States) Danielle Kang
- Rolex Player of the Year: (South Korea) Kim Sei-young
- Rookie of the Year: Not given out, due to the pandemic

The 2020 LPGA Tour was the 71st edition of the LPGA Tour, a series of professional golf tournaments for elite female golfers from around the world. The season began at the Four Season Golf Club in Lake Buena Vista, Florida, on January 16 and ended on December 20 at the Tiburón Golf Club in Naples, Florida. The tournaments were sanctioned by the United States–based Ladies Professional Golf Association (LPGA).

== Schedule and results ==
The number in parentheses after each winners' name is the player's total number of wins in official money individual events on the LPGA Tour, including that event. Tournament and winner names in bold indicate LPGA majors.

Several events were postponed or canceled due to the coronavirus pandemic.

Key

Major championships
Regular events
Team championships

Date	Tournament	Location	Winner	WWGR points	Purse ($)	Winner's share ($)
Jan 9	Diamond Resorts Tournament of Champions	Florida	(Mexico) Gaby López (2)	24	1,200,000	180,000
Jan 26	Gainbridge LPGA at Boca Rio	Florida	(Sweden) Madelene Sagström (1)	40	2,000,000	300,000
Feb 9	ISPS Handa Vic Open	Australia	(South Korea) Park Hee-young (3)	20.5	1,100,000	165,000
Feb 16	ISPS Handa Women's Australian Open	Australia	(South Korea) Inbee Park (20)	37	1,300,000	195,000
~~Feb 23~~	Honda LPGA Thailand	Thailand	Tournament canceled		1,600,000	240,000
~~Mar 1~~	HSBC Women's World Championship	Singapore	Tournament canceled		1,500,000	225,000
~~Mar 8~~	Blue Bay LPGA	China	Tournament canceled		2,100,000	315,000
~~Mar 22~~	Volvik Founders Cup	Arizona	Tournament canceled		1,500,000	225,000
~~Apr 18~~	Lotte Championship	Hawaii	Tournament canceled		2,000,000	300,000
~~Apr 26~~	Hugel-Air Premia LA Open	California	Tournament canceled		1,500,000	225,000
~~May 3~~	LPGA Mediheal Championship	California	Tournament canceled		1,800,000	270,000
~~May 24~~	Pure Silk Championship	Virginia	Tournament canceled		1,300,000	195,000
~~Jul 18~~	Dow Great Lakes Bay Invitational	Michigan	Tournament canceled		2,300,000	279,500 (each)
Aug 2 (Note: New tournament to restart the tour following suspension due to the COVID-19 pandemic.)	LPGA Drive On Championship – Inverness	Ohio	(United States) Danielle Kang (4)	28	1,000,000	150,000
Aug 9 (Note: Tournament rescheduled from Jul 9–12.)	Marathon Classic	Ohio	(United States) Danielle Kang (5)	31	1,700,000	255,000
~~Aug 9~~ (Note: Tournament rescheduled from July 23–26.)	**The Evian Championship**	France	Tournament canceled		4,100,000	615,000
Aug 16	Aberdeen Standard Investments Ladies Scottish Open	Scotland	(United States) Stacy Lewis (13)	34	1,500,000	225,000
Aug 23	**AIG Women's Open Championship**	Scotland	(Germany) **Sophia Popov** (1)	100	4,500,000	675,000
~~Aug 30~~	UL International Crown	England	Tournament canceled		1,600,000	100,000 (each)
Aug 30 (Note: Tournament rescheduled from Jun 19–21.)	Walmart NW Arkansas Championship	Arkansas	(United States) Austin Ernst (2)	46	2,300,000	345,000
~~Sep 6~~	CP Women's Open	British Columbia	Tournament canceled		2,350,000	352,500
Sep 13 (Note: Tournament rescheduled from April 2–5.)	**ANA Inspiration**	California	(South Korea) **Mirim Lee** (4)	100	3,100,000	465,000
Sep 20	Cambia Portland Classic	Oregon	(England) Georgia Hall (2)	37	1,750,000	262,500
~~Sep 27~~	Kia Classic	California	Tournament canceled		2,000,000	300,000
~~Oct 4~~ (Note: Tournament rescheduled from Jun 11–14.)	Meijer LPGA Classic	Michigan	Tournament canceled		2,300,000	345,000
Oct 4 (Note: Tournament rescheduled from May 29–31 and Jul 31 – Aug 2.)	ShopRite LPGA Classic	New Jersey	(England) Mel Reid (1)	46	1,300,000	195,000
Oct 11 (Note: Tournament rescheduled from Jun 25–28.)	**KPMG Women's PGA Championship**	Pennsylvania	(South Korea) **Kim Sei-young** (11)	100	4,300,000	645,000
~~Oct 18~~	Buick LPGA Shanghai	China	Tournament canceled		2,100,000	315,000
~~Oct 25~~	BMW Ladies Championship	South Korea	Tournament canceled		2,000,000	300,000
Oct 25 (Note: New tournament created as replacement for the fall Asian swing cancellation due to COVID-19 pandemic.)	LPGA Drive On Championship – Reynolds Lake Oconee	Georgia	(United States) Ally McDonald (1)	28	1,300,000	195,000
~~Nov 1~~	Taiwan Swinging Skirts LPGA	Taiwan	Tournament canceled		2,200,000	330,000
~~Nov 8~~	Toto Japan Classic	Japan	Tournament not co-sanctioned		1,500,000	225,000
Nov 22 (Note: Tournament rescheduled from May 14–17.)	Pelican Women's Championship	Florida	(South Korea) Kim Sei-young (12)	40	1,500,000	225,000
Dec 6 (Note: Tournament rescheduled from Oct 1–4.)	Volunteers of America Classic	Texas	(United States) Angela Stanford (7)	40	1,750,000	262,500
Dec 13 (Note: Tournament rescheduled from May 30 – June 2.)	**U.S. Women's Open**	Texas	(South Korea) **Kim A-lim** (1)	100	5,500,000	1,000,000
Dec 20 (Note: Tournament rescheduled from Nov 19–22.)	CME Group Tour Championship	Florida	(South Korea) Ko Jin-young (7)	50	3,000,000	1,100,000

=== Unofficial events ===
The following event appears on the schedule, but does not carry official money.

Date	Tournament	Host country	Winner	WWGR points
~~8 Aug~~	Olympic women's golf competition	Japan	Postponed	

== Statistics leaders ==
=== Money list leaders ===
Rank	Player	Events	Prize money ($)
1	(South Korea) Ko Jin-young	4	1,667,925
2	(South Korea) Kim Sei-young	9	1,416,993
3	(South Korea) Inbee Park	13	1,377,799
4	(United States) Danielle Kang	13	897,872
5	(Japan) Nasa Hataoka	12	854,024
6	(United States) Austin Ernst	17	771,092
7	(United States) Amy Olson	16	763,832
8	(Australia) Minjee Lee	16	724,273
9	(New Zealand) Lydia Ko	13	677,545
10	(Canada) Brooke Henderson	10	648,604

Source and complete list: LPGA official website.

=== Scoring average ===
Rank	Player	Total strokes	Total rounds	Average
1	(South Korea) Kim Sei-young	2,404	35	66.686
2	(Canada) Brooke Henderson	2,579	37	69.703
3	(South Korea) Inbee Park	3,153	45	70.067
4	(United States) Danielle Kang	3,434	49	70.082
5	(Japan) Nasa Hataoka	3,295	47	70.106
6	(New Zealand) Lydia Ko	3,302	47	70.255
7	(United States) Nelly Korda	2,881	41	70.268
8	(United States) Lexi Thompson	3,032	43	70.512
9	(Spain) Carlota Ciganda	3,035	43	70.581
10	(Thailand) Moriya Jutanugarn	3,531	50	70.620

Source and complete list: LPGA official website.

== Awards ==
Award	Winner	Country
Rolex Player of the Year	Kim Sei-young	South Korea
Glenna Collett-Vare Trophy	Danielle Kang	United States
Louise Suggs Rolex Rookie of the Year	Not given out	
Money winner	Ko Jin-young	South Korea
Rolex Annika Major Award		
Race to the CME Globe	Inbee Park	South Korea

== See also ==
- 2020 Ladies European Tour
- 2020 Symetra Tour
