= The ANNIKA =

Golf tournament

Coordinates: 27.935°N 82.81°W

Tournament information
- Location: Belleair, Florida, U.S.
- Established: 2020
- Course: Pelican Golf Club
- Par: 70
- Length: 6,268 yards (5,731 m)
- Tour: LPGA Tour
- Format: Stroke play – 72 holes
- Prize fund: $3.25 million
- Month played: November

Tournament record score
- Aggregate: 261 Lilia Vu (2023); 261 Linn Grant (2025)
- To par: −19 as above

Current champion
- (Sweden) Linn Grant

Location in the United States
Location in Florida

The Annika, full name is The ANNIKA driven by Gainbridge at Pelican, formerly the Pelican Women's Championship, is a women's professional golf tournament in Florida on the LPGA Tour. A new event in 2020, it was played at Pelican Golf Club in Belleair near Tampa.

The 2022 event was scheduled to be held November 10–13, but the Thursday, November 10 start date was eliminated due to the approach of Hurricane Nicole with rain and strong winds, and the tournament was shortened to 54 holes. The storm hit with a 70 miles per hour (110 km/h) wind, and 4.68 inches (11.9 cm) rain fell on the Tampa Bay area on Thursday. The sandy subsoil allowed for rapid drainage of the rainwater, and the golf course crew worked overnight so that play could begin as proposed at 6:55 a.m. on Friday, by which time the course was in notably good shape.

In 2024, Nelly Korda earned her third title with a 3-shot victory over Charley Hull, Im Jin-hee, and Zhang Weiwei. During the 2024 pro-am, Caitlin Clark, 2024 WNBA Rookie of the Year played the front nine alongside Korda and the back nine with Annika Sörenstam.

The event is the last full-field LPGA Tour event of the season. It is also a final opportunity for players to reach the top 60 in the rankings for the CME Group Tour Championship or retain their Tour cards by finishing in the top 100.

== Tournament names ==
- 2020–2022: Pelican Women's Championship
- 2023–present: The ANNIKA driven by Gainbridge at Pelican

== Winners ==
Year	Date	Champion	Country	Winning score	To par	Margin of victory	Purse ($)	Winner's share ($)	Ref
2025	Nov 16	Linn Grant	Sweden	68-63-65-65=261	–19	3 strokes	3,250,000	487,500	
2024	Nov 17	Nelly Korda (3)	United States	66-66-67-67=266	−14	3 strokes	3,250,000	487,500	
2023	Nov 12	Lilia Vu	United States	67-66-62-66=261	−19	3 strokes	3,250,000	487,500	
2022	Nov 13	Nelly Korda (2)	United States	66-66-64=196	−14	1 stroke	2,000,000	300,000	
2021	Nov 14	Nelly Korda	United States	65-66-63-69=263	−17	Playoff	1,750,000	262,500	
2020	Nov 22	Kim Sei-young	South Korea	67-65-64-70=266	−14	3 strokes	1,500,000	225,000	

== Tournament record ==
Year	Player	Score	Round
2023	Amy Yang	61 (−9)	3rd
