= Gainbridge LPGA =

Women's golf tournament

Gainbridge LPGA at Boca Rio

Tournament information
- Location: Boca Raton, Florida, U.S.
- Established: 2020
- Course: Boca Rio Golf Club
- Par: 72
- Length: 6,701 yards (6,127 m)
- Tour: LPGA Tour
- Format: Stroke play – 72 holes
- Prize fund: $2.0 million
- Final year: 2022

Tournament record score
- Aggregate: 271 Madelene Sagström (2020)
- To par: −17 as above

Final champion
- (New Zealand) Lydia Ko

Location map
- Location in the United States Location in Florida

The Gainbridge LPGA at Boca Rio was a women's professional golf tournament in Florida on the LPGA Tour. Previously, Gainbridge had been presenting sponsor of the Indy Women in Tech Championship at the Indianapolis Motor Speedway from 2017 to 2019. In 2020, their sponsorship was moved a new event in Florida, played at Boca Rio Golf Club in Boca Raton. It was held at Lake Nona Golf & Country Club in 2021.

== Winners ==
| Year | Dates | Champion | Winning score | To par | Margin of victory | Purse ($) | Winner's share ($) |
|---|---|---|---|---|---|---|---|
| 2022 | Jan 27–30 | (New Zealand) Lydia Ko | 63-70-72-69=274 | −14 | 1 stroke | 2,000,000 | 300,000 |
| 2021 | Feb 25–28 | (United States) Nelly Korda | 67-68-68-69=272 | −16 | 3 strokes | 2,000,000 | 300,000 |
| 2020 | Jan 23–26 | (Sweden) Madelene Sagström | 72-62-67-70=271 | −17 | 1 stroke | 2,000,000 | 300,000 |

== Tournament records ==
| Year | Player | Score | Round |
|---|---|---|---|
| 2020 | Madelene Sagström | 62 (−10) | 2nd |
