= LPGA Taiwan Championship =

Golf tournament in Taiwan

Coordinates: 25.100°N 121.305°E

Tournament information
- Location: Taipei, Taiwan
- Established: 2011
- Course: Miramar Golf Country Club
- Par: 72
- Length: 6,437 yards (5,886 m)
- Tour: LPGA Tour
- Format: Stroke play – 72 holes, no cut
- Prize fund: US$2.2 million
- Month played: October/November
- Final year: 2022

Tournament record score
- Aggregate: 266 Inbee Park (2014)
- To par: −22 as above

Final champion
- (United States) Nelly Korda

Location in Taiwan

The LPGA Taiwan Championship was a women's professional golf tournament in Taiwan on the LPGA Tour. It debuted as the Sunrise LPGA Taiwan Championship in 2011 at the Sunrise Golf & Country Club in Yangmei. It was the first LPGA tournament ever played in Taiwan. It moved to Miramar Golf Country Club in Taipei and was renamed to the Fubon LPGA Taiwan Championship in 2014.

The field was limited to 90 players who played all 72 holes; however, there was a cut for LPGA season-long points championship purposes at the end of 72 holes of the top 40 and ties. Only the players who make this cut earned points to qualify for the season-ending CME Group Tour Championship.

Tournament names:

- 2011–2013: Sunrise LPGA Taiwan Championship
- 2014–2016: Fubon LPGA Taiwan Championship
- 2017–2018: Swinging Skirts LPGA Taiwan Championship
- 2019–2022: Taiwan Swinging Skirts LPGA

Host courses:

- 2011–2013: Sunrise Golf & Country Club
- 2014–2019: Miramar Golf Country Club

== Winners ==
Year	Dates	Champion	Country	Winning score	To par	Margin of victory	Runner(s)-up	Purse (US$)	Winner's share
2022	Canceled due to ongoing travel restrictions.								
2021	Canceled due to ongoing travel, border restrictions, current health concerns on the COVID-19 pandemic.								
2020	Cancelled due to the COVID-19 pandemic.								
2019	31 Oct – 3 Nov	Nelly Korda	United States	66-67-65-72=270	−18	Playoff	(Germany) Caroline Masson (Australia) Minjee Lee	2,200,000	330,000
2018	25–28 Oct	Nelly Korda	United States	67-71-69-68=275	−13	2 strokes	(Australia) Minjee Lee	2,200,000	330,000
2017	19–22 Oct	Ji Eun-hee	South Korea	66-71-69-65=271	−17	6 strokes	(New Zealand) Lydia Ko	2,200,000	330,000
2016	6–9 Oct	Jang Ha-na	South Korea	69-69-62-71=271	−17	1 stroke	(China) Shanshan Feng	2,000,000	300,000
2015	22–25 Oct	Lydia Ko	New Zealand	69-67-67-65=268	−20	9 strokes	(South Korea) Eun-Hee Ji (South Korea) So Yeon Ryu	2,000,000	300,000
2014	30 Oct – 2 Nov	Inbee Park	South Korea	64-62-69-71=266	−22	2 strokes	(United States) Stacy Lewis	2,000,000	300,000
2013	24–27 Oct	Suzann Pettersen	Norway	68-69-73-69=279	−9	5 strokes	(Spain) Azahara Muñoz	2,000,000	300,000
2012	25–28 Oct	Suzann Pettersen	Norway	69-65-66-69=269	−19	3 strokes	(South Korea) Inbee Park	2,000,000	300,000
2011	20–23 Oct	Yani Tseng	Taiwan	68-71-67-66=272	−16	5 strokes	(Spain) Azahara Muñoz (South Korea) Amy Yang	2,000,000	300,000

== Tournament record ==
Year	Player	Score	Round	Course
2012	(South Korea) Inbee Park	64 (−8)	3rd	Sunrise Golf & Country Club
2014	(South Korea) Mirim Lee	62 (−10)	2nd	Miramar Golf Country Club
2014	(South Korea) Inbee Park	62 (−10)	2nd	Miramar Golf Country Club
2016	(England) Jodi Ewart	62 (−10)	3rd	Miramar Golf Country Club
2016	(South Korea) Jang Ha-na	62 (−10)	3rd	Miramar Golf Country Club

== See also ==
- List of sporting events in Taiwan
