= 2023 Women's PGA Championship =

2023 KPMG Women's PGA Championship
Tournament information
- Dates: June 22–25, 2023
- Location: Springfield, New Jersey
- Courses: Baltusrol Golf Club (Lower Course)
- Organized by: PGA of America
- Tour: LPGA Tour
- Format: Stroke play - 72 holes

Statistics
- Par: 71
- Length: 6,831 yards (6,246 m)
- Prize fund: $10,000,000
- Winner's share: $1,500,000

Champion
- (China) Yin Ruoning
- 276 (–8)

The 2023 KPMG Women's PGA Championship was the 69th Women's PGA Championship. It was played June 22–25, 2023 at Baltusrol Golf Club in Springfield, New Jersey. Known as the LPGA Championship through 2014, it was the second of five major championships on the LPGA Tour during the 2023 season.

It was won by Yin Ruoning with an aggregate of 276, eight under par. She finished one stroke ahead of Yuka Saso.

== Field ==
The field included 156 players who met one or more of the selection criteria and commit to participate by a designated deadline.

1. Sponsor invitations

- Gabriela Ruffels
- Mariah Stackhouse

2. Past winners of the Women's PGA Championship

- Chun In-gee (3,6,7,10)
- Laura Davies
- Hannah Green (3,4,6,7,10)
- Brooke Henderson (3,4,7,10)
- Danielle Kang (4,7,10)
- Cristie Kerr
- Kim Sei-young (3,6,7,10)
- Nelly Korda (3,4,7,10)
- Anna Nordqvist (3,4,7,10)
- Park Sung-hyun (3,10)
- Shanshan Feng, Inbee Park (4), and Yani Tseng did not play

3. Professionals who have won an LPGA major championship in the previous five years and during the current year

- Ashleigh Buhai (4,7,10)
- Georgia Hall (7,10)
- Ariya Jutanugarn (4,10)
- Kim A-lim (7,10)
- Ko Jin-young (4,7,10)
- Jennifer Kupcho (4,7,10)
- Lee Jeong-eun (10)
- Minjee Lee (4,6,7,10)
- Pernilla Lindberg (10)
- Yuka Saso (4,7,10)
- Hinako Shibuno (7,10)
- Angela Stanford
- Patty Tavatanakit (4,10)
- Lilia Vu (4,6,7,10)
- Mirim Lee and Sophia Popov did not play

4. Professionals who have won an official LPGA tournament in the previous two calendar years and during the current year

- Marina Alex (10)
- Pajaree Anannarukarn (10)
- Céline Boutier (7,10)
- Matilda Castren (10)
- Gemma Dryburgh (10)
- Jodi Ewart Shadoff (7,10)
- Ally Ewing (7,10)
- Austin Ernst
- Ayaka Furue (7,10)
- Nasa Hataoka (6,7,10)
- Hsu Wei-ling (10)
- Charley Hull (7,10)
- Ji Eun-hee (6,10)
- Grace Kim (10)
- Kim Hyo-joo (6,7,10)
- Lydia Ko (7,10)
- Andrea Lee (7,10)
- Gaby López (7,10)
- Nanna Koerstz Madsen (10)
- Leona Maguire (7,10)
- Ryann O'Toole (10)
- Paula Reto (10)
- Lizette Salas (10)
- Maja Stark (7,10)
- Atthaya Thitikul (6,7,10)
- Yin Ruoning (7,10)
- Rose Zhang (10)
- Jessica Korda (6,7,10) did not play

5. Order of Merit winners from the Ladies European Tour, LPGA of Japan Tour, and LPGA of Korea Tour

- Linn Grant (LET,7,10)
- Park Min-ji (KLPGA,7) and Miyū Yamashita (JLPGA,7) did not play

6. Professionals who finished top-10 and ties at the previous year's Women's PGA Championship

- Jennifer Chang (10)
- Choi Hye-jin (7,10)
- Stephanie Kyriacou (10)
- Stephanie Meadow (10)
- Lexi Thompson (7,10)

7. Professionals ranked No. 1–50 on the Women's World Golf Rankings as of May 22, 2023

- Carlota Ciganda (10)
- Allisen Corpuz (10)
- Megan Khang (10)
- Cheyenne Knight (10)
- Lin Xiyu (10)
- Yuna Nishimura (10)
- Ryu Hae-ran (10)
- Madelene Sagström (10)
- Mao Saigo
- Angel Yin (10)
- Kim Su-ji, Lee Ye-won, Park Ji-young, Jiyai Shin did not play

8. The top eight finishers at the 2022 LPGA T&CP National Championship

- Sandra Changkija
- Joanna Coe
- Stephanie Connelly Eiswerth
- Allie Knight
- Emily Miller
- Samantha Morrell
- Alisa Rodriguez
- Amy Ruengmateekhun

9. The top finisher (not otherwise qualified via the 2022 LPGA T&CP National Championship) at the 2023 PGA Women's Stroke Play Championship

- Loretta Giovannettone

10. LPGA members who have committed to the event, ranked in the order of their position on the 2023 CME Globe Points list

- Brittany Altomare
- An Na-rin
- Aditi Ashok
- Jaravee Boonchant
- Celine Borge
- Peiyun Chien
- Chella Choi
- Lauren Coughlin
- Daniela Darquea
- Karis Davidson
- Perrine Delacour
- Brianna Do
- Amanda Doherty
- Allison Emrey
- Dana Fall
- María Fassi
- Mina Harigae
- Lauren Hartlage
- Esther Henseleit
- Daniela Holmqvist
- Yu-Sang Hou
- Joo Soo-bin
- Moriya Jutanugarn
- Haeji Kang
- Minami Katsu
- Sarah Kemp
- Christina Kim
- Gina Kim
- Kim In-Kyung
- Frida Kinhult
- Aline Krauter
- Ines Laklalech
- Bronte Law
- Alison Lee
- Lee Mi-hyang
- Min Lee
- Stacy Lewis
- Lucy Li
- Brittany Lincicome
- Liu Yan
- Wichanee Meechai
- Morgane Métraux
- Azahara Muñoz
- Yealimi Noh
- Haru Nomura
- Su-Hyun Oh
- Lee-Anne Pace
- Alexa Pano
- Annie Park
- Emily Kristine Pedersen
- Pornanong Phatlum
- Mel Reid
- Sarah Schmelzel
- Sophia Schubert
- Jenny Shin
- Jennifer Song
- Marissa Steen
- Lauren Stephenson
- Linnea Ström
- Thidapa Suwannapura
- Maddie Szeryk
- Elizabeth Szokol
- Emma Talley
- Bailey Tardy
- Gabriella Then
- Charlotte Thomas
- Mariajo Uribe
- Albane Valenzuela
- Natthakritta Vongtaveelap
- Samantha Wagner
- Lindsey Weaver-Wright
- Dewi Weber
- Jing Yan
- Amy Yang
- Yin Xiaowen
- Pavarisa Yoktuan
- Yu Liu
- Arpichaya Yubol

== Round summaries ==
=== First round ===
Thursday, June 22, 2023

Lee-Anne Pace shot a 5-under-par round of 66 to take a one stroke lead over Brooke Henderson, Lin Xiyu, and Yin Ruoning. Defending champion Chun In-gee shot 74 while world number 1 Ko Jin-young shot 72.

Place	Player	Score	To Par
1	(South Africa) Lee-Anne Pace	66	−5
T2	(Canada) Brooke Henderson	67	−4
T2	(China) Lin Xiyu	67	−4
T2	(China) Yin Ruoning	67	−4
5	(Thailand) Wichanee Meechai	68	−3
T6	(Norway) Celine Borge	69	−2
T6	(Japan) Ayaka Furue	69	−2
T6	(Germany) Esther Henseleit	69	−2
T6	(Republic of Ireland) Leona Maguire	69	−2
T6	(Japan) Yuka Saso	69	−2
T6	(South Korea) Jenny Shin	69	−2

=== Second round ===
Friday, June 23, 2023

Place	Player	Score	To Par
1	(Republic of Ireland) Leona Maguire	69-68=137	−5
T2	(Norway) Celine Borge	69-69=138	−4
T2	(China) Lin Xiyu	67-71=138	−4
T2	(England) Mel Reid	71-67=138	−4
T5	(Australia) Minjee Lee	72-67=139	−3
T5	(South Africa) Lee-Anne Pace	66-73=139	−3
7	(China) Yin Ruoning	67-73=140	−2
T8	(France) Céline Boutier	70-71=141	−1
T8	(United States) Allisen Corpuz	70-71=141	−1
T8	(Canada) Brooke Henderson	67-74=141	−1
T8	(United States) Gina Kim	72-69=141	−1
T8	(South Korea) Ko Jin-young	72-69=141	−1
T8	(Northern Ireland) Stephanie Meadow	73-68=141	−1
T8	(South Korea) Jenny Shin	69-72=141	−1

=== Third round ===
Saturday, June 24, 2023

Place	Player	Score	To Par
1	(Republic of Ireland) Leona Maguire	69-68-69=206	−7
2	(South Korea) Jenny Shin	69-72-66=207	−6
3	(Northern Ireland) Stephanie Meadow	73-68-67=208	−5
T4	(South Africa) Lee-Anne Pace	66-73-70=209	−4
T4	(China) Yin Ruoning	67-73-69=209	−4
T6	(United States) Lauren Coughlin	75-67-68=210	−3
T6	(South Korea) Ko Jin-young	72-69-69=210	−3
T8	(United States) Mina Harigae	73-68-70=211	−2
T8	(United States) Megan Khang	74-70-67=211	−2
T8	(China) Lin Xiyu	67-71-73=211	−2
T8	(Japan) Yuka Saso	69-73-69=211	−2

=== Final round ===
Sunday, June 25, 2023

Place	Player	Score	To Par	Prize money ($)
1	(China) Yin Ruoning	67-73-69-67=276	−8	1,500,000
2	(Japan) Yuka Saso	69-73-69-66=277	−7	875,130
T3	(Spain) Carlota Ciganda	72-73-69-64=278	−6	423,070
T3	(United States) Megan Khang	74-70-67-67=278	−6	423,070
T3	(China) Lin Xiyu	67-71-73-67=278	−6	423,070
T3	(Northern Ireland) Stephanie Meadow	73-68-67-70=278	−6	423,070
T3	(Sweden) Anna Nordqvist	74-73-66-65=278	−6	423,070
T8	(Japan) Ayaka Furue	69-75-69-66=279	−5	214,811
T8	(South Korea) Jenny Shin	69-72-66-72=279	−5	214,811
T8	(United States) Rose Zhang	70-74-68-67=279	−5	214,811
