= 2024 Evian Championship =

Golf tournament

Tournament information
- Dates: 11–14 July 2024
- Location: Évian-les-Bains, France; 46.394°N 6.570°E
- Course: Evian Resort Golf Club
- Tours: Ladies European Tour; LPGA Tour

Statistics
- Par: 71
- Length: 6,333 yards (5,791 m)
- Field: 132 players, 67 after cut
- Cut: 142 (E)
- Prize fund: $8,000,000
- Winner's share: $1,200,000

Champion
- (Japan) Ayaka Furue
- 265 (–19)

Location map
- Location in France Location in Auvergne-Rhône-Alpes

The 2024 Evian Championship was played 11–14 July in France. It was the 30th Evian Championship (the first 20 played as the Evian Masters), and the 11th as a major championship on the LPGA Tour.

== Field ==
The field for the tournament was set at 132, and most earned exemptions based on past performance on the Ladies European Tour, the LPGA Tour, or with a high ranking in the Women's World Golf Rankings.

1. Evian invitations (six)

- Adéla Cernousek (a)
- Perrine Delacour
- Rachel Kuehn (a)
- Ingrid Lindblad
- Pauline Roussin
- Yana Wilson (a)

2. Top 50 from Women's World Golf Rankings

- Céline Boutier
- Ashleigh Buhai
- Allisen Corpuz
- Ally Ewing
- Ayaka Furue
- Linn Grant
- Hannah Green
- Georgia Hall
- Nasa Hataoka
- Brooke Henderson
- Charley Hull
- Hwang You-min
- Im Jin-hee
- Akie Iwai
- Megan Khang
- Kim Hyo-joo
- Kim Sei-young
- Ko Jin-young
- Lydia Ko
- Nelly Korda
- Jennifer Kupcho
- Alison Lee
- Minjee Lee
- Lee Ye-won
- Park Ji-young
- Gabriela Ruffels
- Ryu Hae-ran
- Madelene Sagström
- Yuka Saso
- Hinako Shibuno
- Maja Stark
- Rio Takeda
- Patty Tavatanakit
- Atthaya Thitikul
- Lilia Vu
- Chanettee Wannasaen
- Miyū Yamashita
- Amy Yang
- Rose Zhang

3. Winner of the Jabra Ladies Open

- Morgane Métraux

4. Past Evian Championship winners

- Anna Nordqvist
- Angela Stanford

5. Majors winners

- Lee Jeong-eun
- Sophia Popov

6. LPGA Tournament winners

- Alexa Pano
- Linnea Ström
- Bailey Tardy

7. LET Order of Merit

- Aditi Ashok
- Nicole Broch Estrup
- Trichat Cheenglab
- Diksha Dagar
- Manon De Roey
- Alexandra Försterling
- Johanna Gustavsson
- Bronte Law
- Marta Martín
- Ana Peláez
- Chiara Tamburlini
- Shannon Tan
- Anne van Dam

8. Top 10 and ties previous year Evian Championship

- Celine Borge
- Gemma Dryburgh
- Kim A-lim
- Gaby López

9. Amateur winners

- Ela Anacona (Women's Amateur Latin America Championship)
- Melanie Green (Women's Amateur Championship)
- Megan Schofill (U.S. Women's Amateur)
- Lottie Woad (Augusta National Women's Amateur)
- Wu Chun-wei (Women's Amateur Asia-Pacific Championship)

10. LPGA Tour CME Globe points list (if needed to fill the field to 132)

- Marina Alex
- An Na-rin
- Pajaree Anannarukarn
- Pei-Yun Chien
- Choi Hye-jin
- Lauren Coughlin
- Olivia Cowan
- Lindy Duncan
- Jodi Ewart Shadoff
- Isabella Fierro
- Kristen Gillman
- Savannah Grewal
- Nataliya Guseva
- Lauren Hartlage
- Esther Henseleit
- Hsu Wei-ling
- Caroline Inglis
- Jeon Ji-won
- Ariya Jutanugarn
- Moriya Jutanugarn
- Minami Katsu
- Sarah Kemp
- Auston Kim
- Grace Kim
- Frida Kinhult
- Cheyenne Knight
- Stephanie Kyriacou
- Lee Mi-hyang
- Lee So-mi
- Lucy Li
- Ruixin Liu
- Liu Yan
- Nanna Koerstz Madsen
- Caroline Masson
- Stephanie Meadow
- Wichanee Meechai
- Azahara Muñoz
- Hira Naveed
- Yuna Nishimura
- Yealimi Noh
- Ryann O'Toole
- Emily Kristine Pedersen
- Paula Reto
- Mao Saigo
- Sarah Schmelzel
- Jenny Shin
- Sung Yu-jin
- Thidapa Suwannapura
- Elizabeth Szokol
- Albane Valenzuela
- Yin Xiaowen
- Arpichaya Yubol
- Zhang Weiwei

== Round summaries ==
=== First round ===
Thursday, 11 July 2024

Place	Player	Score	To par
T1	(Scotland) Gemma Dryburgh	64	−7
T1	(Sweden) Ingrid Lindblad	64	−7
T1	(Thailand) Patty Tavatanakit	64	−7
T4	(South Korea) Choi Hye-jin	65	−6
T4	(United States) Lauren Coughlin	65	−6
T4	(Japan) Ayaka Furue	65	−6
T4	(South Korea) Kim Hyo-joo	65	−6
T4	(New Zealand) Lydia Ko	65	−6
T4	(Mexico) Gaby López	65	−6
T10	(Australia) Stephanie Kyriacou	66	−5
T10	(South Korea) Ryu Hae-ran	66	−5
T10	(Sweden) Madelene Sagström	66	−5
T10	(Japan) Rio Takeda	66	−5
T10	(Netherlands) Anne van Dam	66	−5

=== Second round ===
Friday, 12 July 2024
Saturday, 13 July 2024

Place	Player	Score	To par
1	(Japan) Ayaka Furue	65-65=130	−12
T2	(Australia) Stephanie Kyriacou	66-66=132	−10
T2	(Thailand) Patty Tavatanakit	64-68=132	−10
4	(South Korea) Choi Hye-jin	65-68=133	−9
5	(Sweden) Ingrid Lindblad	64-70=134	−8
T6	(United States) Lauren Coughlin	65-70=135	−7
T6	(Scotland) Gemma Dryburgh	64-71=135	−7
T6	(South Korea) Lee Mi-hyang	69-66=135	−7
T6	(South Korea) Sung Yu-jin	72-63=135	−7
T10	(South Korea) An Na-rin	69-67=136	−6
T10	(Thailand) Pajaree Anannarukarn	67-69=136	−6
T10	(England) Georgia Hall	69-67=136	−6
T10	(Germany) Esther Henseleit	70-66=136	−6
T10	(South Korea) Ko Jin-young	69-67=136	−6
T10	(Netherlands) Anne van Dam	66-70=136	−6

=== Third round ===
Saturday, 13 July 2024

Place	Player	Score	To par
1	(Australia) Stephanie Kyriacou	66-66-67=199	−14
T2	(United States) Lauren Coughlin	65-70-65=200	−13
T2	(Japan) Ayaka Furue	65-65-70=200	−13
4	(Thailand) Pajaree Anannarukarn	67-69-67=203	−10
T5	(South Korea) Choi Hye-jin	65-68-71=204	−9
T5	(United States) Ally Ewing	70-70-64=204	−9
T5	(Thailand) Patty Tavatanakit	64-68-72=204	−9
T8	(South Korea) An Na-rin	69-67-69=205	−8
T8	(Sweden) Ingrid Lindblad	64-70-71=205	−8
T8	(South Korea) Sung Yu-jin	72-63-70=205	−8
T8	(Thailand) Chanettee Wannasaen	69-69-67=205	−8

=== Final round ===
Sunday, 14 July 2024

Champion
(c) = past champion

Place	Player	Score	To par	Money ($)
1	(Japan) Ayaka Furue	65-65-70-65=265	−19	1,200,000
2	(Australia) Stephanie Kyriacou	66-66-67-67=266	−18	731,723
3	(Thailand) Patty Tavatanakit	64-68-72-63=267	−17	530,813
4	(United States) Lauren Coughlin	65-70-65-69=269	−15	410,626
5	(South Korea) Ryu Hae-ran	66-71-69-65=271	−13	330,508
6	(Thailand) Pajaree Anannarukarn	67-69-67-70=273	−11	270,414
T7	(Chinese Taipei) Pei-Yun Chien	68-73-67-66=274	−10	200,976
T7	(South Korea) Choi Hye-jin	65-68-71-70=274	−10	200,976
T7	(Germany) Esther Henseleit	70-66-70-68=274	−10	200,976
T10	(United States) Ally Ewing	70-70-64-71=275	−9	156,238
T10	(Japan) Akie Iwai	72-65-70-68=275	−9	156,238

Leaderboard below the top 10
Place	Player	Score	To par	Money ($)
T12	(South Korea) An Na-rin	69-67-69-71=276	−8	124,188
T12	(South Korea) Kim Hyo-joo (c)	65-72-72-67=276	−8	124,188
T12	(South Africa) Paula Reto	73-67-68-68=276	−8	124,188
T12	(Sweden) Madelene Sagström	66-73-67-70=276	−8	124,188
T12	(South Korea) Jenny Shin	71-71-67-67=276	−8	124,188
T17	(India) Aditi Ashok	71-70-67-69=277	−7	95,988
T17	(Scotland) Gemma Dryburgh	64-71-71-71=277	−7	95,988
T17	(England) Georgia Hall	69-67-71-70=277	−7	95,988
T17	(South Korea) Lee So-mi	70-67-69-71=277	−7	95,988
T17	(Thailand) Chanettee Wannasaen	69-69-67-72=277	−7	95,988
T22	(United States) Jennifer Kupcho	71-70-68-69=278	−6	81,025
T22	(United States) Alison Lee	68-70-71-69=278	−6	81,025
T22	(Sweden) Anna Nordqvist (c)	72-70-71-65=278	−6	81,025
T22	(Switzerland) Albane Valenzuela	71-66-72-69=278	−6	81,025
T26	(United States) Allisen Corpuz	69-68-72-70=279	−5	63,163
T26	(Sweden) Linn Grant	71-68-71-69=279	−5	63,163
T26	(Canada) Brooke Henderson (c)	69-68-71-71=279	−5	63,163
T26	(United States) Nelly Korda	69-72-70-68=279	−5	63,163
T26	(Sweden) Ingrid Lindblad	64-70-71-74=279	−5	63,163
T26	(Mexico) Gaby López	65-75-68-71=279	−5	63,163
T26	(United States) Angela Stanford (c)	68-69-71-71=279	−5	63,163
T26	(South Korea) Sung Yu-jin	72-63-70-74=279	−5	63,163
T26	(United States) Lilia Vu	71-71-69-68=279	−5	63,163
T35	(Thailand) Ariya Jutanugarn	70-70-66-74=280	−4	48,275
T35	(South Korea) Ko Jin-young (c)	69-67-70-74=280	−4	48,275
T35	(United States) Ryann O'Toole	67-74-70-69=280	−4	48,275
T35	(Japan) Mao Saigo	71-70-69-70=280	−4	48,275
T39	(France) Céline Boutier (c)	69-68-73-71=281	−3	40,061
T39	(New Zealand) Lydia Ko (c)	65-73-72-71=281	−3	40,061
T39	(Sweden) Maja Stark	72-68-72-69=281	−3	40,061
T39	(Japan) Miyū Yamashita	71-71-67-72=281	−3	40,061
T39	(United States) Rose Zhang	72-69-69-71=281	−3	40,061
T44	(Australia) Hannah Green	73-69-70-70=282	−2	32,849
T44	(Japan) Yuna Nishimura	69-71-73-69=282	−2	32,849
T44	(United States) Sarah Schmelzel	71-68-72-71=282	−2	32,849
T44	(Thailand) Thidapa Suwannapura	71-69-71-71=282	−2	32,849
T44	(Netherlands) Anne van Dam	66-70-74-72=282	−2	32,849
T49	(France) Perrine Delacour	73-69-72-69=283	−1	28,642
T49	(Australia) Minjee Lee (c)	70-69-68-76=283	−1	28,642
T51	(Australia) Grace Kim	70-70-74-70=284	E	26,440
T51	(South Korea) Lee Mi-hyang	69-66-76-73=284	E	26,440
T51	(Japan) Hinako Shibuno	71-71-73-69=284	E	26,440
54	(Denmark) Emily Kristine Pedersen	67-74-69-75=285	+1	24,840
T55	(Australia) Gabriela Ruffels	69-72-76-70=287	+3	23,234
T55	(Japan) Rio Takeda	66-73-71-77=287	+3	23,234
T55	(Switzerland) Chiara Tamburlini	69-72-73-73=287	+3	23,234
T58	(United States) Rachel Kuehn (a)	71-69-73-75=288	+4	0
T58	(South Korea) Lee Jeong-eun	69-70-75-74=288	+4	21,632
T60	(United States) Lindy Duncan	73-69-73-74=289	+5	20,433
T60	(United States) Elizabeth Szokol	71-71-76-71=289	+5	20,433
62	(United States) Andrea Lee	70-71-78-71=290	+6	19,633
T63	(Japan) Minami Katsu	74-68-75-74=291	+7	19,028
T63	(South Korea) Amy Yang	69-70-77-75=291	+7	19,028
T65	(United States) Lauren Hartlage	70-72-72-78=292	+8	18,228
T65	(Spain) Marta Martín	72-69-77-74=292	+8	18,228
67	(Thailand) Arpichaya Yubol	73-69-71-83=296	+12	17,627
CUT	(Germany) Alexandra Försterling	71-72=143	+1	
CUT	(Chinese Taipei) Hsu Wei-ling	73-70=143	+1	
CUT	(South Korea) Im Jin-hee	70-73=143	+1	
CUT	(Sweden) Frida Kinhult	69-74=143	+1	
CUT	(China) Liu Yan	71-72=143	+1	
CUT	(Denmark) Nanna Koerstz Madsen	70-73=143	+1	
CUT	(Thailand) Atthaya Thitikul	71-72=143	+1	
CUT	(France) Adéla Cernousek (a)	71-73=144	+2	
CUT	(United States) Kristen Gillman	71-73=144	+2	
CUT	(South Korea) Jeon Ji-won	74-70=144	+2	
CUT	(England) Bronte Law	75-69=144	+2	
CUT	(Republic of Ireland) Leona Maguire	72-72=144	+2	
CUT	(Thailand) Wichanee Meechai	74-70=144	+2	
CUT	(United States) Angel Yin	70-74=144	+2	
CUT	(Belgium) Manon De Roey	72-73=145	+3	
CUT	(United States) Melanie Green (a)	69-76=145	+3	
CUT	(Japan) Nasa Hataoka	71-74=145	+3	
CUT	(Germany) Caroline Masson	73-72=145	+3	
CUT	(England) Lottie Woad (a)	74-71=145	+3	
CUT	(United States) Marina Alex	71-75=146	+4	
CUT	(Norway) Celine Borge	72-74=146	+4	
CUT	(Denmark) Nicole Broch Estrup	72-74=146	+4	
CUT	(Sweden) Johanna Gustavsson	72-74=146	+4	
CUT	(Thailand) Moriya Jutanugarn	72-74=146	+4	
CUT	(Australia) Sarah Kemp	75-71=146	+4	
CUT	(Switzerland) Morgane Métraux	75-71=146	+4	
CUT	(Spain) Azahara Muñoz	73-73=146	+4	
CUT	(Germany) Sophia Popov	69-77=146	+4	
CUT	(Japan) Yuka Saso	71-75=146	+4	
CUT	(United States) Megan Schofill (a)	73-73=146	+4	
CUT	(United States) Bailey Tardy	75-71=146	+4	
CUT	(South Korea) Hwang You-min	72-75=147	+5	
CUT	(United States) Cheyenne Knight	73-74=147	+5	
CUT	(United States) Lucy Li	75-72=147	+5	
CUT	(United States) Yealimi Noh	70-77=147	+5	
CUT	(France) Pauline Roussin	76-71=147	+5	
CUT	(Spain) Ana Peláez	71-76=147	+5	
CUT	(Chinese Taipei) Wu Chun-Wei (a)	71-76=147	+5	
CUT	(Russia) Nataliya Guseva	74-74=148	+6	
CUT	(England) Charley Hull	79-69=148	+6	
CUT	(United States) Caroline Inglis	76-72=148	+6	
CUT	(United States) Auston Kim	76-72=148	+6	
CUT	(Australia) Hira Naveed	75-73=148	+6	
CUT	(United States) Alexa Pano	72-76=148	+6	
CUT	(China) Zhang Weiwei	72-76=148	+6	
CUT	(Germany) Olivia Cowan	74-75=149	+7	
CUT	(United States) Megan Khang	73-76=149	+7	
CUT	(China) Ruixin Liu	75-74=149	+7	
CUT	(Spain) Carlota Ciganda	70-80=150	+8	
CUT	(England) Jodi Ewart Shadoff	75-75=150	+8	
CUT	(South Korea) Lee Ye-won	72-78=150	+8	
CUT	(South Korea) Park Ji-young	70-80=150	+8	
CUT	(South Korea) Kim A-lim	76-75=151	+9	
CUT	(South Korea) Kim Sei-young	77-74=151	+9	
CUT	(Singapore) Shannon Tan	75-76=151	+9	
CUT	(China) Yin Xiaowen	77-74=151	+9	
CUT	(Sweden) Linnea Ström	77-75=152	+10	
CUT	(Thailand) Trichat Cheenglab	73-80=153	+11	
CUT	(Mexico) Isabella Fierro	75-78=153	+11	
CUT	(Canada) Savannah Grewal	76-77=153	+11	
CUT	(United States) Yana Wilson (a)	76-78=154	+12	
CUT	(Northern Ireland) Stephanie Meadow	74-81=155	+13	
CUT	(Argentina) Ela Anacona (a)	80-79=159	+17	
WD	(India) Diksha Dagar	76	+5	
WD	(South Africa) Ashleigh Buhai			

==== Scorecard ====
Final round

Hole	1	2	3	4	5	6	7	8	9	10	11	12	13	14	15	16	17	18
Par	4	3	4	4	3	4	5	3	5	4	4	4	4	3	5	3	4	5
(Japan) Furue	–13	–14	–15	–14	–14	–14	–14	–14	–15	–15	–15	–14	–14	–15	–16	–17	–17	–19
(Australia) Kyriacou	–14	–14	–15	–15	–15	–15	–16	–16	–16	–16	–16	–16	–16	–16	–17	–18	–17	–18
(Thailand) Tavatanakit	–9	–10	–10	–10	–11	–11	–11	–11	–12	–12	–13	–14	–14	–15	–15	–15	–15	–17
(United States) Coughlin	–13	–14	–15	–15	–15	–16	–16	–16	–17	–17	–17	–17	–17	–17	–17	–16	–15	–15
(South Korea) Ryu	–7	–7	–7	–7	–8	–8	–9	–9	–8	–8	–9	–9	–8	–8	–9	–10	–11	–13
(Thailand) Anannarukarn	–10	–11	–11	–10	–10	–9	–8	–8	–8	–8	–8	–9	–9	–10	–11	–10	–9	–11

Cumulative tournament scores, relative to par

Eagle	Birdie	Bogey
