= 2024 Chevron Championship =

Tournament information
- Dates: April 18–21, 2024
- Location: The Woodlands, Texas; 30.193°N 95.550°W
- Courses: The Club at Carlton Woods; Jack Nicklaus Signature Course
- Tour: LPGA Tour
- Format: Stroke play – 72 holes

Statistics
- Par: 72
- Length: 6,824 yards (6,240 m)
- Field: 132 players, 73 after cut
- Cut: 146 (+2)
- Prize fund: US$7,900,000
- Winner's share: $1,200,000

Champion
- (United States) Nelly Korda
- 275 (−13)
- Location in the United States Location in Texas

The 2024 Chevron Championship was the 53rd Chevron Championship LPGA golf tournament, held April 18–21 in Texas at The Club at Carlton Woods in The Woodlands, a suburb north of Houston. In its third year with Chevron Corporation as the title sponsor, it was the tournament's 42nd year as a major championship. The Golf Channel televised the event for the 14th consecutive year, with coverage on NBC Sports for the second consecutive year.

Nelly Korda won her second major title, two strokes ahead of runner-up Maja Stark, and equaled an LPGA record with five consecutive wins, tying Nancy Lopez (1978) and Annika Sörenstam (2004–05).

== Field ==
Players for the event are listed under the first category in which they qualified; additional categories are in parentheses.

1. Winners of all previous Chevron Championships

- Ko Jin-young (2,3,4,5,6)
- Lydia Ko (3,6)
- Jennifer Kupcho (3,5)
- Stacy Lewis
- Brittany Lincicome
- Pernilla Lindberg
- Ryu So-yeon
- Patty Tavatanakit (3,5,6)
- Lexi Thompson (5)
- Yani Tseng
- Mirim Lee, Inbee Park, and Lilia Vu (2,3,4,5,6) did not play

2. Winners of the U.S. Women's Open, Women's PGA Championship, Women's British Open, and The Evian Championship in the previous five years

- Céline Boutier (3,5,6,7)
- Ashleigh Buhai (3,5,6)
- Chun In-gee (5)
- Allisen Corpuz (4,5,6)
- Hannah Green (3,5,6)
- Brooke Henderson (3,5,6)
- Kim A-lim (4,5)
- Kim Sei-young (5)
- Nelly Korda (3,4,5,6)
- Lee Jeong-eun
- Minjee Lee (3,5,6)
- Anna Nordqvist (5)
- Sophia Popov
- Yuka Saso (5,6)
- Hinako Shibuno
- Yin Ruoning (3,5,6)

3. Winners of official LPGA Tour tournaments from the 2021 ANA Inspiration through the week immediately preceding the 2024 Chevron Championship

- Marina Alex
- Pajaree Anannarukarn (5)
- Matilda Castren (5)
- Gemma Dryburgh (5)
- Jodi Ewart Shadoff (5)
- Ally Ewing (5,6)
- Ayaka Furue (5,6)
- Linn Grant (5,6)
- Nasa Hataoka (5,6)
- Hsu Wei-ling
- Charley Hull (5,6)
- Mone Inami
- Ji Eun-hee (5)
- Ariya Jutanugarn (5)
- Danielle Kang (5)
- Megan Khang (4,5,6)
- Grace Kim (5)
- Kim Hyo-joo (5,6)
- Cheyenne Knight (5)
- Andrea Lee (5,6)
- Gaby López (5)
- Nanna Koerstz Madsen (5)
- Leona Maguire (5,6)
- Ryann O'Toole (5)
- Alexa Pano (5)
- Paula Reto
- Ryu Hae-ran (5,6)
- Maja Stark (5)
- Elizabeth Szokol (5)
- Bailey Tardy
- Atthaya Thitikul (4,5,6)
- Chanettee Wannasaen (5,6)
- Amy Yang (4,5,6)
- Angel Yin (4,5,6)
- Rose Zhang (5,6)

4. All players who finished in the top-10 in the previous year's Chevron Championship

- Albane Valenzuela (5)

5. Top-80 on the previous year's season-ending LPGA Tour Race to the CME Globe points list

- An Na-rin
- Aditi Ashok (6)
- Celine Borge
- Pei-Yun Chien
- Choi Hye-jin (6)
- Carlota Ciganda (6)
- Lauren Coughlin
- Olivia Cowan
- Perrine Delacour
- María Fassi
- Georgia Hall (6)
- Esther Henseleit
- Minami Katsu
- Sarah Kemp
- Stephanie Kyriacou
- Alison Lee (6)
- Lee Mi-hyang
- Lin Xiyu (6)
- Liu Yan
- Yu Liu
- Stephanie Meadow
- Azahara Muñoz
- Yuna Nishimura
- Bianca Pagdanganan
- Emily Kristine Pedersen
- Madelene Sagström
- Sarah Schmelzel
- Jenny Shin
- Linnea Ström
- Thidapa Suwannapura
- Lindsey Weaver-Wright

6. Top-40 on the Women's World Golf Rankings as of a March 25, 2024

- Bang Shin-sil
- Akie Iwai (7)
- Jiyai Shin
- Miyū Yamashita (7)
- Lee Ye-won (7) and Park Min-ji did not play

7. Top-2 players from the previous year's season-ending Ladies European Tour Order of Merit, LPGA of Japan Tour Order of Merit and LPGA of Korea Tour money list

- Trichat Cheenglab
- Im Jin-hee

8. Any LPGA Member who did not compete in the previous year's Chevron Championship major due to injury, illness or maternity, who subsequently received a medical/maternity extension of membership from the LPGA in the previous calendar year, provided they were otherwise qualified to compete in the previous year's Chevron Championship

- Caroline Masson

9. Amateur exemptions

- Ela Anacona
- Jasmine Koo
- Megan Schofill
- Yana Wilson
- Lottie Woad
- Wu Chun-wei

10. Sponsor invitations

- Lizette Salas
- Angela Stanford

11. Top players on the current year LPGA Tour Race to the CME Globe points list at the end of the last official tournament prior to the current Chevron Championship, not otherwise qualified above

- Robyn Choi
- Karis Davidson
- Lindy Duncan
- Isabella Fierro
- Isi Gabsa
- Kristen Gillman
- Savannah Grewal
- Caroline Inglis
- Moriya Jutanugarn
- Auston Kim
- Lee So-mi
- Lucy Li
- Ruixin Liu
- Polly Mack
- Malia Nam
- Hira Naveed
- Yealimi Noh
- Park Hee-young
- Gabriela Ruffels
- Mao Saigo
- Jennifer Song
- Sung Yu-jin
- Yin Xiaowen
- Zhang Weiwei

== Round summaries ==
=== First round ===
Thursday, April 18, 2024

Lauren Coughlin shot a 6-under-par 66 to lead by two strokes after the first round. Nelly Korda, trying to tie a LPGA record by recording her fifth straight victory, was one of three golfers tied for second place along with Marina Alex and Minami Katsu. Defending champion Lilia Vu withdrew before the start of her round with a back injury.

Place	Player	Score	To par
1	(United States) Lauren Coughlin	66	−6
T2	(United States) Marina Alex	68	−4
T2	(Japan) Minami Katsu	68	−4
T2	(United States) Nelly Korda	68	−4
T5	(New Zealand) Lydia Ko	69	−3
T5	(South Korea) Im Jin-hee	69	−3
T5	(China) Lin Xiyu	69	−3
T5	(Australia) Gabriela Ruffels	69	−3
T5	(Thailand) Atthaya Thitikul	69	−3
T10	(United States) Lindy Duncan	70	−2
T10	(England) Jodi Ewart Shadoff	70	−2
T10	(United States) Kristen Gillman	70	−2
T10	(England) Georgia Hall	70	−2
T10	(Australia) Sarah Kemp	70	−2
T10	(Sweden) Anna Nordqvist	70	−2
T10	(South Korea) Jenny Shin	70	−2
T10	(Sweden) Maja Stark	70	−2

=== Second round ===
Friday, April 19, 2024

Place	Player	Score	To par
T1	(South Korea) Im Jin-hee	69-67=136	−8
T1	(Thailand) Atthaya Thitikul	69-67=136	−8
3	(United States) Nelly Korda	68-69=137	−7
4	(South Korea) Ryu Hae-ran	72-66=138	−6
T5	(South Korea) Bang Shin-sil	74-65=139	−5
T5	(United States) Lauren Coughlin	66-73=139	−5
T5	(Japan) Minami Katsu	68-71=139	−5
T5	(Sweden) Maja Stark	70-69=139	−5
T5	(China) Zhang Weiwei	72-67=139	−5
T10	(England) Jodi Ewart Shadoff	70-70=140	−4
T10	(New Zealand) Lydia Ko	69-71=140	−4
T10	(United States) Andrea Lee	71-69=140	−4
T10	(China) Lin Xiyu	69-71=140	−4
T10	(United States) Yealimi Noh	71-69=140	−4
T10	(Sweden) Anna Nordqvist	70-70=140	−4
T10	(England) Lottie Woad (a)	71-69=140	−4

=== Third round ===
Saturday, April 20, 2024
Sunday, April 21, 2024

Place	Player	Score	To par
1	(South Korea) Ryu Hae-ran	72-66-67=205	−11
T2	(Canada) Brooke Henderson	71-71-64=206	−10
T2	(United States) Nelly Korda	68-69-69=206	−10
T4	(South Korea) Im Jin-hee	69-67-72=208	−8
T4	(Sweden) Maja Stark	70-69-69=208	−8
T4	(Thailand) Atthaya Thitikul	69-67-72=208	−8
7	(Japan) Minami Katsu	68-71-70=209	−7
T8	(Spain) Carlota Ciganda	75-67-68=210	−6
T8	(United States) Lauren Coughlin	66-73-71=210	−6
T8	(Japan) Nasa Hataoka	71-71-68=210	−6

=== Final round ===
Sunday, April 21, 2024

Champion
(c) = past champion

Place	Player	Score	To par	Money ($)
1	(United States) Nelly Korda	68-69-69-69=275	−13	1,200,000
2	(Sweden) Maja Stark	70-69-69-69=277	−11	666,834
T3	(United States) Lauren Coughlin	66-73-71-68=278	−10	428,976
T3	(Canada) Brooke Henderson	71-71-64-72=278	−10	428,976
5	(South Korea) Ryu Hae-ran	72-66-67-74=279	−9	301,199
6	(Spain) Carlota Ciganda	75-67-68-70=280	−8	246,434
7	(Germany) Esther Henseleit	72-72-67-70=281	−7	206,275
8	(South Korea) Im Jin-hee	69-67-72-74=282	−6	180,721
T9	(Japan) Minami Katsu	68-71-70-74=283	−5	149,077
T9	(South Korea) Kim A-lim	72-70-70-71=283	−5	149,077
T9	(United States) Yealimi Noh	71-69-71-72=283	−5	149,077

Leaderboard below the top 10
Place	Player	Score	To par	Money ($)
12	(Thailand) Atthaya Thitikul	69-67-72-76=284	−4	127,777
T13	(Japan) Nasa Hataoka	71-71-68-75=285	−3	112,688
T13	(United States) Jasmine Koo (a)	74-70-70-71=285	−3	0
T13	(China) Lin Xiyu	69-71-73-72=285	−3	112,688
T13	(China) Zhang Weiwei	72-67-72-74=285	−3	112,688
T17	(Sweden) Linn Grant	75-71-68-72=286	−2	89,568
T17	(New Zealand) Lydia Ko (c)	69-71-71-75=286	−2	89,568
T17	(United States) Andrea Lee	71-69-72-74=286	−2	89,568
T17	(Denmark) Nanna Koerstz Madsen	74-72-66-74=286	−2	89,568
T17	(Sweden) Anna Nordqvist	70-70-73-73=286	−2	89,568
T17	(Japan) Miyū Yamashita	72-72-71-71=286	−2	89,568
T23	(Mexico) Isabella Fierro	72-70-73-72=287	−1	71,192
T23	(England) Georgia Hall	70-73-72-72=287	−1	71,192
T23	(England) Charley Hull	74-71-70-72=287	−1	71,192
T23	(United States) Jennifer Kupcho (c)	72-73-71-71=287	−1	71,192
T23	(South Korea) Jiyai Shin	72-73-66-76=287	−1	71,192
T23	(England) Lottie Woad (a)	71-69-73-74=287	−1	0
T23	(China) Yin Ruoning	74-72-69-72=287	−1	71,192
T30	(United States) Marina Alex	68-73-71-76=288	E	52,098
T30	(South Korea) An Na-rin	73-70-69-76=288	E	52,098
T30	(United States) Ally Ewing	74-69-74-71=288	E	52,098
T30	(Japan) Akie Iwai	71-75-71-71=288	E	52,098
T30	(United States) Auston Kim	72-69-71-76=288	E	52,098
T30	(South Korea) Kim Sei-young	72-72-71-73=288	E	52,098
T30	(United States) Brittany Lincicome (c)	72-71-73-72=288	E	52,098
T30	(Northern Ireland) Stephanie Meadow	71-72-73-72=288	E	52,098
T30	(Sweden) Madelene Sagström	71-73-69-75=288	E	52,098
T30	(Japan) Yuka Saso	72-72-70-74=288	E	52,098
T40	(South Korea) Bang Shin-sil	74-65-76-74=289	+1	37,299
T40	(Chinese Taipei) Chien Pei-yun	73-70-73-73=289	+1	37,299
T40	(Germany) Olivia Cowan	71-75-71-72=289	+1	37,299
T40	(Australia) Stephanie Kyriacou	72-69-73-75=289	+1	37,299
T40	(Germany) Caroline Masson	72-73-73-71=289	+1	37,299
T40	(Australia) Gabriela Ruffels	69-73-70-77=289	+1	37,299
T46	(South Korea) Choi Hye-jin	73-72-72-73=290	+2	30,484
T46	(Japan) Mone Inami	74-72-73-71=290	+2	30,484
T46	(Thailand) Chanettee Wannasaen	71-71-75-73=290	+2	30,484
T46	(South Korea) Amy Yang	73-70-72-75=290	+2	30,484
T50	(England) Jodi Ewart Shadoff	70-70-72-79=291	+3	26,194
T50	(Japan) Ayaka Furue	71-71-75-74=291	+3	26,194
T50	(Chinese Taipei) Hsu Wei-ling	72-73-70-76=291	+3	26,194
T50	(Japan) Hinako Shibuno	76-69-71-75=291	+3	26,194
T54	(Australia) Robyn Choi	73-73-69-77=292	+4	23,365
T54	(Scotland) Gemma Dryburgh	74-68-70-80=292	+4	23,365
T54	(South Africa) Paula Reto	76-68-77-71=292	+4	23,365
T57	(United States) Allisen Corpuz	72-71-73-77=293	+5	21,174
T57	(South Korea) Jenny Shin	70-76-73-74=293	+5	21,174
T57	(China) Yin Xiaowen	74-71-71-77=293	+5	21,174
T60	(United States) Lindy Duncan	70-71-75-78=294	+6	19,350
T60	(United States) Alexa Pano	72-74-70-78=294	+6	19,350
T62	(India) Aditi Ashok	75-71-73-76=295	+7	17,525
T62	(United States) Kristen Gillman	70-73-77-75=295	+7	17,525
T62	(Thailand) Moriya Jutanugarn	74-72-73-76=295	+7	17,525
T62	(United States) Cheyenne Knight	73-73-72-77=295	+7	17,525
T62	(South Korea) Park Hee-young	73-70-74-78=295	+7	17,525
T67	(Japan) Yuna Nishimura	74-72-74-76=296	+8	16,245
T67	(United States) Lindsey Weaver-Wright	75-70-71-80=296	+8	16,245
69	(United States) Ryann O'Toole	72-73-75-77=297	+9	15,701
T70	(United States) Caroline Inglis	71-74-73-80=298	+10	15,150
T70	(Australia) Sarah Kemp	70-73-75-80=298	+10	15,150
T72	(Australia) Karis Davidson	72-74-74-79=299	+11	14,515
T72	(South Korea) Lee Mi-hyang	71-73-78-77=299	+11	14,515
CUT	(Finland) Matilda Castren	73-74=147	+3	
CUT	(South Korea) Chun In-gee	73-74=147	+3	
CUT	(France) Perrine Delacour	77-70=147	+3	
CUT	(United States) Megan Khang	76-71=147	+3	
CUT	(South Korea) Ko Jin-young (c)	76-71=147	+3	
CUT	(United States) Stacy Lewis (c)	74-73=147	+3	
CUT	(China) Liu Yan	73-74=147	+3	
CUT	(Japan) Mao Saigo	73-74=147	+3	
CUT	(United States) Angela Stanford	74-73=147	+3	
CUT	(Switzerland) Albane Valenzuela	75-72=147	+3	
CUT	(Norway) Celine Borge	73-75=148	+4	
CUT	(France) Céline Boutier	75-73=148	+4	
CUT	(Mexico) María Fassi	75-73=148	+4	
CUT	(Australia) Grace Kim	76-72=148	+4	
CUT	(United States) Alison Lee	78-70=148	+4	
CUT	(Republic of Ireland) Leona Maguire	72-76=148	+4	
CUT	(United States) Megan Schofill (a)	73-75=148	+4	
CUT	(Thailand) Patty Tavatanakit (c)	77-71=148	+4	
CUT	(Australia) Hannah Green	77-72=149	+5	
CUT	(Canada) Savannah Grewal	76-73=149	+5	
CUT	(South Korea) Ji Eun-hee	75-74=149	+5	
CUT	(United States) Lucy Li	75-74=149	+5	
CUT	(Sweden) Pernilla Lindberg (c)	75-74=149	+5	
CUT	(Mexico) Gaby López	74-75=149	+5	
CUT	(Spain) Azahara Muñoz	76-73=149	+5	
CUT	(United States) Malia Nam	73-76=149	+5	
CUT	(United States) Rose Zhang	74-75=149	+5	
CUT	(Argentina) Ela Anacona (a)	77-73=150	+6	
CUT	(Germany) Isi Gabsa	76-74=150	+6	
CUT	(Thailand) Ariya Jutanugarn	76-74=150	+6	
CUT	(South Korea) Lee Jeong-eun	72-78=150	+6	
CUT	(South Korea) Lee So-mi	76-74=150	+6	
CUT	(China) Ruixin Liu	74-76=150	+6	
CUT	(China) Yu Liu	72-78=150	+6	
CUT	(Germany) Sophia Popov	76-74=150	+6	
CUT	(United States) Lizette Salas	76-74=150	+6	
CUT	(Thailand) Trichat Cheenglab	77-74=151	+7	
CUT	(Australia) Minjee Lee	74-77=151	+7	
CUT	(South Korea) Ryu So-yeon (c)	77-74=151	+7	
CUT	(United States) Sarah Schmelzel	75-76=151	+7	
CUT	(Thailand) Thidapa Suwannapura	76-75=151	+7	
CUT	(United States) Elizabeth Szokol	75-76=151	+7	
CUT	(United States) Bailey Tardy	76-75=151	+7	
CUT	(Thailand) Pajaree Anannarukarn	78-74=152	+8	
CUT	(South Korea) Kim Hyo-joo	75-77=152	+8	
CUT	(Denmark) Emily Kristine Pedersen	79-73=152	+8	
CUT	(South Korea) Sung Yu-jin	72-80=152	+8	
CUT	(United States) Lexi Thompson (c)	78-74=152	+8	
CUT	(South Africa) Ashleigh Buhai	83-70=153	+9	
CUT	(United States) Danielle Kang	74-79=153	+9	
CUT	(Germany) Polly Mack	75-78=153	+9	
CUT	(United States) Yana Wilson (a)	75-79=154	+10	
CUT	(Australia) Hira Naveed	78-77=155	+11	
CUT	(Chinese Taipei) Wu Chun-Wei (a)	77-78=155	+11	
CUT	(Chinese Taipei) Yani Tseng (c)	78-78=156	+12	
CUT	(Philippines) Bianca Pagdanganan	80-77=157	+13	
CUT	(Sweden) Linnea Ström	81-78=159	+15	
CUT	(United States) Jennifer Song	81-81=162	+18	
WD	(United States) Angel Yin (Note: Yin withdrew after her round on Thursday due to an ankle injury.)	78	+6	
