= 2023 Women's British Open =

Golf tournament

2023 AIG Women's Open
Tournament information
- Dates: 10–13 August 2023
- Location: Surrey, England; 51.278°N 0.244°W
- Course: Walton Heath Golf Club
- Organized by: The R&A
- Tours: Ladies European Tour; LPGA Tour

Statistics
- Par: 72
- Length: 6,881 yards (6,292 m)
- Field: 144 players
- Prize fund: $9,000,000
- Winner's share: $1,350,000

Champion
- (United States) Lilia Vu
- 274 (–14)
- Location in the United Kingdom Location in England

The 2023 AIG Women's Open was played from 10 to 13 August in England at Walton Heath Golf Club. It was the 47th Women's British Open, the 23rd as a major championship on the LPGA Tour, and the fourth championship held under a sponsorship agreement with AIG. It was the first Women's British Open to be hosted at Walton Heath.

== Field ==
The field was made up of 144 players. As with previous tournaments, most players earned exemptions based on past performance on the Ladies European Tour, the LPGA Tour, previous major championships, or with a high ranking in the Women's World Golf Rankings. The rest of the field earned entry by successfully competing in qualifying tournaments open to any female golfer, professional or amateur, with a low handicap.

=== Exemptions ===
Players who qualified for the event are listed below. Players are listed under the first category in which they qualified.

1. Winners of the Women's British Open, aged 60 or younger at the scheduled end of the championship, provided they are still active members of a recognised tour.

- Ashleigh Buhai (2,5,7,10)
- Laura Davies
- Georgia Hall (3,5,7)
- Ariya Jutanugarn
- Kim In-Kyung
- Stacy Lewis
- Catriona Matthew
- Anna Nordqvist (7)
- Hinako Shibuno (2)
- Jiyai Shin (7)
- Helen Alfredsson, Sophie Gustafson, Jang Jeong, Emilee Klein, Karen Lunn, Mo Martin, Liselotte Neumann, Lorena Ochoa, Pak Se-ri, Inbee Park, Sophia Popov, Annika Sörenstam, Sherri Steinhauer, Karen Stupples, Yani Tseng, and Karrie Webb did not play

2. The top 10 finishers and ties from the 2022 Women's British Open.

- Céline Boutier (5,7,10,16)
- Chun In-gee (5,7,14)
- Nasa Hataoka (5,7)
- Brooke Henderson (5,7,10,16)
- Lydia Ko (5,7,10)
- Stephanie Kyriacou
- Minjee Lee (5,7,15,16)
- Leona Maguire (5,7,10)
- Madelene Sagström (5,7)
- Atthaya Thitikul (5,7)

3. The top 15 on the final 2022 LET Order of Merit.

- Manon De Roey
- Linn Grant (7,10)
- Johanna Gustavsson
- Caroline Hedwall
- Alice Hewson
- Tiia Koivisto
- Meghan MacLaren
- Morgane Métraux
- Lee-Anne Pace
- Ana Peláez
- Magdalena Simmermacher
- Maja Stark (7,10)
- Liz Young
- Whitney Hillier did not play

4. The top 5 on the 2023 LET Order of Merit not already exempt (as of 17 July 2023).

- Trichat Cheenglab
- Olivia Cowan
- Cara Gainer
- Céline Herbin
- Chiara Noja
- Klára Spilková

5. The top 35 on the final 2022 Race to the CME Globe points list.

- Marina Alex
- Choi Hye-jin (7)
- Allisen Corpuz (7,10,15)
- Gemma Dryburgh
- Jodi Ewart Shadoff
- Ayaka Furue (7)
- Hannah Green (7,10,14)
- Charley Hull (7)
- Danielle Kang (7)
- Megan Khang (7)
- Kim Hyo-joo
- Ko Jin-young (7,10,13,16)
- Nelly Korda (7,10,14)
- Jennifer Kupcho (7,13)
- Andrea Lee (7)
- Lin Xiyu (7)
- Gaby López
- Nanna Koerstz Madsen
- Paula Reto
- Yuka Saso (7,15)
- Lexi Thompson (7)
- Lilia Vu (7,10,13)
- Jessica Korda (7) and Lizette Salas did not play

6. The top 25 on the 2023 Race to the CME Globe points list not already exempt (as of 17 July 2023).

- An Na-rin
- Jaravee Boonchant
- Matilda Castren
- Pei-Yun Chien
- Lauren Coughlin
- Perrine Delacour
- Lindy Duncan
- María Fassi
- Mina Harigae
- Esther Henseleit
- Moriya Jutanugarn
- Minami Katsu
- Alison Lee
- Liu Yan
- Stephanie Meadow
- Ryann O'Toole
- Emily Kristine Pedersen
- Mel Reid
- Sarah Schmelzel
- Jenny Shin
- Linnea Ström
- Bailey Tardy
- Albane Valenzuela
- Lindsey Weaver-Wright
- Yu Liu
- Celine Borge did not play

7. The top 50 in the Women's World Golf Rankings (as of 3 July 2023).

- Aditi Ashok (10)
- Carlota Ciganda (10)
- Ally Ewing
- Akie Iwai
- Chisato Iwai
- Ji Eun-hee
- Haruka Kawasaki
- Kim A-lim (15)
- Kim Sei-young (14)
- Cheyenne Knight
- Yuna Nishimura
- Ryu Hae-ran
- Mao Saigo
- Kokona Sakurai
- Miyū Yamashita (11)
- Amy Yang
- Angel Yin
- Rose Zhang (10)
- Kim Su-ji, Lee Ye-won, and Park Min-ji (12) did not play

8. The top 3 on the JLPGA Money List not already exempt as of the Suntory Ladies Open.

- Lala Anai
- Yuri Yoshida
- Fumika Kawagishi did not play

9. The top 2 on the KLPGA Money List not already exempt (as of 3 July 2023).

10. Winners of any recognised LET or LPGA Tour events in the 2023 calendar year.

- Carmen Alonso
- Pajaree Anannarukarn
- Diksha Dagar
- Lily May Humphreys
- Nuria Iturrioz
- Grace Kim
- Kristýna Napoleaová
- Lisa Pettersson
- Pauline Roussin
- Patricia Isabel Schmidt
- Yin Ruoning (14)

11. Winner of the 2022 JLPGA Money List.

12. Winners of the 2022 KLPGA Money List.

13. Winners of the last five editions of the Chevron Championship.

- Patty Tavatanakit
- Mirim Lee did not play

14. Winners of the last five editions of the Women's PGA Championship.

15. Winners of the last five editions of the U.S. Women's Open.

- Lee Jeong-eun

16. Winners of the last five editions of The Evian Championship.

- Angela Stanford

17. The leading two (not otherwise exempt) in the 2023 Suntory Ladies Open.

- Ayako Kimura
- Shina Kanazawa did not play

18. A minimum of leading three golfers, not otherwise exempt, from the FreeD Group Women's Scottish Open.

- Nicole Broch Estrup
- Sarah Kemp
- Arpichaya Yubol

19. Winner of the 2022 U.S. Women's Amateur.

- Saki Baba (a)

20. The 2022 Mark H. McCormack Medal winner.

- Rose Zhang forfeited exemption by turning professional, qualified under category 7.

21. Winner of the 2022 and 2023 Women's Amateur Asia-Pacific.

- Elia Galitsky (a)
- Huang Ting-hsuan (a)

22. Winner of the 2022 Women's Amateur Latin America.

- Valentina Rossi (a)

23. Winner of the 2023 Augusta National Women's Amateur.

- Rose Zhang forfeited exemption by turning professional, qualified under category 7.

24. Winner of the 2023 Women's Amateur Championship.

- Chiara Horder (a)

25. The highest ranked women in the World Amateur Golf Ranking from Great Britain and Ireland as of week 26.

- Charlotte Heath (a)

26. Winner of the 2023 European Ladies Amateur Championship.

- Julia López (a)

27. Any player who did not compete in the previous year's Women's British Open due to maternity, who subsequently received an extension of membership for the maternity from the player's home tour in the previous year, provided she was otherwise qualified to compete in the previous year's Women's British Open.

=== Final Qualifying ===
Final Qualifying was played over 18 holes on 7 August at Hankley Common with 12 qualifying places available.

- Kelsey Bennett
- Daniela Darquea
- Hayley Davis
- Savannah De Bock (a)
- Anna Foster (a)
- Emma Grechi
- Kylie Henry
- Hsu Wei-ling
- Gina Kim
- Lee Mi-hyang
- Ingrid Lindblad (a)
- Maddie Szeryk
- Chloe Williams

== Round summaries ==
=== First round ===
Thursday, 10 August 2023

Place	Player	Score	To par
1	(United States) Ally Ewing	68	−4
T2	(Thailand) Jaravee Boonchant	69	−3
T2	(France) Perrine Delacour	69	−3
T2	(South Korea) Lee Jeong-eun	69	−3
T2	(Denmark) Emily Kristine Pedersen	69	−3
T2	(South Korea) Amy Yang	69	−3
T7	(Japan) Lala Anai	70	−2
T7	(South Korea) Chun In-gee	70	−2
T7	(Spain) Carlota Ciganda	70	−2
T7	(United States) Allisen Corpuz	70	−2
T7	(Japan) Nasa Hataoka	70	−2
T7	(Japan) Minami Katsu	70	−2
T7	(United States) Megan Khang	70	−2
T7	(South Korea) Kim Hyo-joo	70	−2
T7	(China) Yu Liu	70	−2
T7	(Mexico) Gaby López	70	−2
T7	(Switzerland) Morgane Métraux	70	−2
T7	(Japan) Kokona Sakurai	70	−2

=== Second round ===
Friday, 11 August 2023

Place	Player	Score	To par
1	(United States) Ally Ewing	68-66=134	−10
T2	(England) Charley Hull	71-68=139	−5
T2	(Japan) Minami Katsu	70-69=139	−5
T2	(United States) Andrea Lee	71-68=139	−5
T5	(South Korea) Kim Hyo-joo	70-70=140	−4
T5	(United States) Alison Lee	71-69=140	−4
T5	(Mexico) Gaby López	70-70=140	−4
T5	(United States) Lilia Vu	72-68=140	−4
T9	(India) Aditi Ashok	72-69=141	−3
T9	(United States) Allisen Corpuz	70-71=141	−3
T9	(France) Perrine Delacour	69-72=141	−3
T9	(England) Jodi Ewart Shadoff	72-69=141	−3
T9	(Japan) Nasa Hataoka	70-71=141	−3
T9	(South Korea) Ko Jin-young	73-68=141	−3
T9	(Australia) Minjee Lee	72-69=141	−3
T9	(Thailand) Atthaya Thitikul	74-67=141	−3
T9	(United States) Angel Yin	72-69=141	−3

=== Third round ===
Saturday, 12 August 2023

Place	Player	Score	To par
T1	(England) Charley Hull	71-68-68=207	−9
T1	(United States) Lilia Vu	72-68-67=207	−9
T3	(South Korea) Kim Hyo-joo	70-70-68=208	−8
T3	(United States) Angel Yin	72-69-67=208	−8
5	(United States) Ally Ewing	68-66-75=209	−7
6	(Sweden) Linn Grant	73-69-68=210	−6
T7	(United States) Andrea Lee	71-68-72=211	−5
T7	(South Korea) Jiyai Shin	73-69-69=211	−5
T9	(France) Perrine Delacour	69-72-71=212	−4
T9	(Japan) Nasa Hataoka	70-71-71=212	−4
T9	(United States) Nelly Korda	73-70-69=212	−4
T9	(United States) Alison Lee	71-69-72=212	−4
T9	(South Korea) Amy Yang	69-76-67=212	−4

=== Final round ===
Sunday, 13 August 2023

Place	Player	Score	To par	Prize money (US$)
1	(United States) Lilia Vu	72-68-67-67=274	−14	1,350,000
2	(England) Charley Hull	71-68-68-73=280	−8	828,414
3	(South Korea) Jiyai Shin	73-69-69-70=281	−7	600,106
T4	(South Korea) Kim Hyo-joo	70-70-68-74=282	−6	418,007
T4	(South Korea) Amy Yang	69-76-67-70=282	−6	418,007
T6	(United States) Allisen Corpuz	70-71-74-69=284	−4	260,191
T6	(United States) Ally Ewing	68-66-75-75=284	−4	260,191
T6	(United States) Angel Yin	72-69-67-76=284	−4	260,191
T9	(Germany) Olivia Cowan	72-72-71-70=285	−3	190,387
T9	(United States) Andrea Lee	71-68-72-74=285	−3	190,387
