= 2023 Chevron Championship =

Tournament information
- Dates: April 20–23, 2023
- Location: The Woodlands, Texas; 30.193°N 95.550°W
- Courses: The Club at Carlton Woods; Jack Nicklaus Signature Course
- Tour: LPGA Tour
- Format: Stroke play – 72 holes

Statistics
- Par: 72
- Length: 6,824 yards (6,240 m)
- Field: 132 players, 68 after cut
- Cut: 145 (+1)
- Prize fund: US$5,100,000
- Winner's share: $765,000

Champion
- (United States) Lilia Vu
- 278 (−10)
- Location in the United States Location in Texas

The 2023 Chevron Championship was the 52nd Chevron Championship LPGA golf tournament, held April 20–23 in Texas at The Club at Carlton Woods in The Woodlands, a suburb north of Houston. The tournament was in its second year with Chevron Corporation as the title sponsor and 41st year as a major championship. The Golf Channel televised the event for the 13th consecutive year, with coverage on NBC Sports for the first time since 1990.

This was the first championship at The Club at Carlton Woods after 51 years at Mission Hills Country Club in Rancho Mirage, California.

Lilia Vu beat Angel Yin in a playoff to win her first major.

== Field ==
Players who have qualified for the event are listed below. Players are listed under the first category in which they qualified; additional qualifying categories are shown in parentheses.

1. Winners of all previous Chevron Championships

- Ko Jin-young (2,3,5,6)
- Lydia Ko (3,5,6)
- Jennifer Kupcho (3,4,5,6)
- Stacy Lewis (3,5)
- Brittany Lincicome
- Pernilla Lindberg
- Ryu So-yeon
- Patty Tavatanakit (3,4,5)
- Lexi Thompson (4,5,6)
- Mirim Lee (3) and Yani Tseng did not play

2. Winners of the U.S. Women's Open, Women's PGA Championship, Women's British Open, and The Evian Championship in the previous five years

- Ashleigh Buhai (3,5,6)
- Chun In-gee (3,5,6)
- Hannah Green (4,5,6)
- Georgia Hall (3,5,6)
- Brooke Henderson (3,5,6)
- Ariya Jutanugarn (3,5)
- Kim A-lim (3,5)
- Kim Sei-young (3,5,6)
- Nelly Korda (3,5,6)
- Lee Jeong-eun (5)
- Minjee Lee (3,5,6)
- Park Sung-hyun
- Yuka Saso (3,5,6)
- Hinako Shibuno (4,5,6)
- Angela Stanford (3)
- Anna Nordqvist (3,5,6), Sophia Popov (3) did not play

3. Winners of official LPGA Tour tournaments from the 2020 ANA Inspiration through the week immediately preceding the 2023 Chevron Championship

- Marina Alex (5)
- Pajaree Anannarukarn (5)
- Céline Boutier (4,5,6)
- Matilda Castren (5)
- Gemma Dryburgh (5)
- Jodi Ewart Shadoff (5)
- Ally Ewing (5,6)
- Ayaka Furue (5,6)
- Nasa Hataoka (5,6)
- Hsu Wei-ling
- Charley Hull (5,6)
- Ji Eun-hee (5)
- Danielle Kang (5,6)
- Grace Kim
- Kim Hyo-joo (4,5,6)
- Jessica Korda (5,6)
- Andrea Lee (5,6)
- Gaby López (5,6)
- Nanna Koerstz Madsen (4,5)
- Leona Maguire (5,6)
- Ryann O'Toole (5)
- Mel Reid
- Paula Reto (5)
- Lizette Salas (5)
- Maja Stark (5,6)
- Atthaya Thitikul (5,6)
- Lilia Vu (5,6)
- Yin Ruoning
- Austin Ernst, Inbee Park (5) did not play

4. All players who finished in the top-10 in the previous year's Chevron Championship

- Pia Babnik
- Alison Lee (5)

5. Top-80 on the previous year's season-ending LPGA Tour Race to the CME Globe points list

- Brittany Altomare
- An Na-rin
- Chella Choi
- Choi Hye-jin (6)
- Carlota Ciganda
- Allisen Corpuz (6)
- Lauren Coughlin
- Daniela Darquea
- María Fassi
- Mina Harigae
- Moriya Jutanugarn
- Megan Khang (6)
- Frida Kinhult
- Cheyenne Knight
- Stephanie Kyriacou
- Maude-Aimee Leblanc
- Lin Xiyu (6)
- Wichanee Meechai
- Yealimi Noh
- Emily Kristine Pedersen
- Pornanong Phatlum
- Pauline Roussin
- Madelene Sagström (6)
- Sarah Schmelzel
- Sophia Schubert
- Jenny Shin
- Lauren Stephenson
- Kelly Tan
- Albane Valenzuela
- Lindsey Weaver-Wright
- Amy Yang
- Angel Yin
- Linn Grant (6) did not play

6. Top-40 on the Women's World Golf Rankings as of a March 27, 2023

- Mao Saigo
- Mone Inami, Kim Su-ji, Park Min-ji, Miyū Yamashita did not play

7. Any LPGA Member who did not compete in the previous year's Chevron Championship major due to injury, illness or maternity, who subsequently received a medical/maternity extension of membership from the LPGA in the previous calendar year, provided they were otherwise qualified to compete in the previous year's Chevron Championship

- Elizabeth Szokol

8. Amateur exemptions

- Saki Baba (a) – U.S. Women's Amateur
- Jess Baker (a) – The Women's Amateur Championship
- Valentina Rossi (a) – Women's Amateur Latin America
- Eila Galitsky (a) – Women's Amateur Asia-Pacific
- Zoe Antoinette Campos (a) – Chevron Silverado Showdown

9. Sponsor invitations for top-ranked amateur players

- Amari Avery (a)
- Isabella Fierro (a)
- Ting-Hsuan Huang (a)

10. Top players on the current year LPGA Tour Race to the CME Globe points list at the end of the last official tournament prior to the current Chevron Championship, not otherwise qualified above

- Celine Borge
- Pei-Yun Chien
- Karis Davidson
- Perrine Delacour
- Amanda Doherty
- Dana Fall
- Lauren Hartlage
- Esther Henseleit
- Caroline Inglis
- Minami Katsu
- Sarah Kemp
- Christina Kim
- Gina Kim
- Aline Krauter
- Lee Mi-hyang
- Lucy Li
- Yu Liu
- Polly Mack
- Stephanie Meadow
- Yuna Nishimura
- Annie Park
- Ryu Hae-ran
- Jennifer Song
- Linnea Ström
- Thidapa Suwannapura
- Maddie Szeryk
- Emma Talley
- Bailey Tardy
- Gabriella Then
- Charlotte Thomas
- Natthakritta Vongtaveelap
- Dewi Weber
- Jing Yan
- Yin Xiaowen
- Pavarisa Yoktuan
- Arpichaya Yubol

== Round summaries ==
=== First round ===
Thursday, April 20, 2023

Pei-Yun Chien shot a 5-under-par round of 67 to lead the first round. Six golfers, including world number 2 Nelly Korda, were one stroke off the lead. There were 22 golfers within three strokes of the lead. Defending champion Jennifer Kupcho shot an even-par 72 and was tied for 37th place.

Place	Player	Score	To par
1	(Taiwan) Pei-Yun Chien	67	−5
T2	(United States) Marina Alex	68	−4
T2	(South Korea) Chella Choi	68	−4
T2	(Japan) Ayaka Furue	68	−4
T2	(United States) Nelly Korda	68	−4
T2	(Australia) Stephanie Kyriacou	68	−4
T2	(United States) Lilia Vu	68	−4
8	(United States) Angel Yin	69	−3
T9	(Spain) Carlota Ciganda	70	−2
T9	(Australia) Karis Davidson	70	−2
T9	(United States) Ally Ewing	70	−2
T9	(Thailand) Eila Galitsky (a)	70	−2
T9	(England) Georgia Hall	70	−2
T9	(Japan) Nasa Hataoka	70	−2
T9	(Taiwan) Hsu Wei-ling	70	−2
T9	(South Korea) Ji Eun-hee	70	−2
T9	(United States) Megan Khang	70	−2
T9	(South Korea) Kim Hyo-joo	70	−2
T9	(Australia) Minjee Lee	70	−2
T9	(United States) Brittany Lincicome	70	−2
T9	(Thailand) Atthaya Thitikul	70	−2
T9	(China) Jing Yan	70	−2

=== Second round ===
Friday, April 21, 2023
Saturday, April 22, 2023

The second round was delayed by two hours due to more than two inches of rain falling overnight. Play was suspended Friday evening due to darkness with 31 golfers still on the course. Kim A-lim was the clubhouse leader at 8-under-par while first-round leader Pei-Yun Chien was at 5-under with 4 holes still to play.

The cut came at 145 (+1), with 68 players advancing to the final two rounds. Defending champion Jennifer Kupcho (150, +5) and world number one Lydia Ko both missed the cut (147, +3).

Place	Player	Score	To par
1	(South Korea) Kim A-lim	71-65=136	−8
T2	(United States) Megan Khang	70-67=137	−7
T2	(United States) Lilia Vu	68-69=137	−7
T4	(Canada) Brooke Henderson	71-67=138	−6
T4	(United States) Nelly Korda	68-70=138	−6
T4	(Thailand) Patty Tavatanakit	71-67=138	−6
T7	(United States) Allisen Corpuz	72-67=139	−5
T7	(Switzerland) Albane Valenzuela	72-67=139	−5
T7	(United States) Angel Yin	69-70=139	−5
T10	(France) Céline Boutier	73-67=140	−4
T10	(United States) Ally Ewing	70-70=140	−4
T10	(South Korea) Kim Hyo-joo	70-70=140	−4
T10	(United States) Cheyenne Knight	71-69=140	−4
T10	(China) Lin Xiyu	71-69=140	−4
T10	(Denmark) Nanna Koerstz Madsen	72-68=140	−4

=== Third round ===
Saturday, April 22, 2023

Allisen Corpuz and Angel Yin each shot rounds of 67 to rise from seventh place to the lead at 206 (−10). Second round leader Kim A-lim dropped to a tied for 6th place after an even-par round of 72.

Place	Player	Score	To par
T1	(United States) Allisen Corpuz	72-67-67=206	−10
T1	(United States) Angel Yin	69-70-67=206	−10
T3	(United States) Megan Khang	70-67-70=207	−9
T3	(Switzerland) Albane Valenzuela	72-67-68=207	−9
T3	(South Korea) Amy Yang	73-69-65=207	−9
T6	(South Korea) Choi Hye-jin	71-70-67=208	−8
T6	(South Korea) Kim A-lim	71-65-72=208	−8
T6	(South Korea) Kim Hyo-joo	70-70-68=208	−8
T6	(United States) Nelly Korda	68-70-70=208	−8
10	(Thailand) Atthaya Thitikul	70-71-68=209	−7

=== Final round ===
Sunday, April 23, 2023

Lilia Vu shot a 4-under-par 68 to rise from 11th place to tie the lead with Angel Yin at 278 (−10). The sudden-death playoff started at the 18th hole. Yin's second shot found the water guarding the hole and she made par. Vu birdied from 10 feet to win her first major and second LPGA Tour event of the year.

Place	Player	Score	To par	Prize money (US$)
T1	(United States) Lilia Vu	68-69-73-68=278	−10	Playoff
T1	(United States) Angel Yin	69-70-67-72=278	−10	Playoff
3	(United States) Nelly Korda	68-70-70-71=279	−9	347,974
T4	(United States) Allisen Corpuz	72-67-67-74=280	−8	188,300
T4	(South Korea) Kim A-lim	71-65-72-72=280	−8	188,300
T4	(Thailand) Atthaya Thitikul	70-71-68-71=280	−8	188,300
T4	(Switzerland) Albane Valenzuela	72-67-68-73=280	−8	188,300
T4	(South Korea) Amy Yang	73-69-65-73=280	−8	188,300
T9	(United States) Megan Khang	70-67-70-74=281	−7	111,615
T9	(South Korea) Ko Jin-young	72-71-70-68=281	−7	111,615

==== Playoff ====
The sudden-death playoff was held on the par-5 18th hole. Lilia Vu won with a birdie on the first extra hole.

Place	Player	Score	To par	Money ($)
1	(United States) Lilia Vu	4	−1	765,000
2	(United States) Angel Yin	5	E	479,680

Birdie
