= Jasmine Koo =

American golfer

Personal information
- Nationality: United States
- Born: c.2006

Career
- Sport: Golf
- Status: Amateur

Best results in LPGA major championships
- Chevron Championship: T13: 2024
- Women's PGA C'ship: DNP
- U.S. Women's Open: DNP
- Women's British Open: DNP
- Evian Championship: DNP

Jasmine Koo (born c. 2006) is an American amateur golfer. She was the low amateur at the 2024 Chevron Championship, where she finished 13th and was one of only two amateurs to make the cut.

Koo won the 2023 Women's Western Amateur.

Despite a team loss, she was the top performer for the United States at the 2023 Junior Solheim Cup.

Koo is committed to play for the USC Trojans.

== Amateur wins ==
- 2022 Sergio and Angela Garcia Foundation Junior Championship, PING Heather Farr Classic, Girls Junior Americas Cup
- 2023 Women's Western Amateur, AJGA Invitational
- 2024 Toyota Junior World Cup, Windy City Collegiate Classic, Stanford Intercollegiate
- 2025 Juli Inkster Meadow Club Collegiate, Golfweek Red Sky Classic
- 2026 Dr. Donnis Thompson Invitational, Chevron Silverado Showdown, Big Ten Women's Golf Championships

== Results in LPGA majors ==
Tournament	2024	2025
Chevron Championship	T13	CUT
U.S. Women's Open		
Women's PGA Championship		
The Evian Championship		
Women's British Open		

Did not play

CUT = missed the half-way cut
T = tied

== U.S. national team appearances ==
- Junior Solheim Cup: 2023
- Curtis Cup: 2024, 2026 (winners)
- Arnold Palmer Cup: 2025, 2026
