= 2024 Solheim Cup =

Women's team golf competition

- Dates: September 13–15, 2024
- Venue: Robert Trent Jones Golf Club
- Location: Gainesville, Virginia, U.S.
- Captains: Stacy Lewis (USA); Suzann Pettersen (Europe)
(United States)	15 1/2	12 1/2	(Europe)
- United States wins the Solheim Cup

Location map
- Location in United States Location in Virginia

The 2024 Solheim Cup was the 19th edition of the Solheim Cup matches, held September 13–15 at the Robert Trent Jones Golf Club in Gainesville, Virginia, United States. The Solheim Cup is a biennial team competition between the top women professional golfers from Europe and the United States. The Solheim Cup returned to even-numbered years in 2024, the first time since 2002 after the Ryder Cup returned to an odd-year schedule after 2020, as competition was postponed due to the COVID-19 pandemic.

The previous U.S. competition in 2021 was won by Europe, 15 points to 13. Europe retained the cup in Spain in 2023 after a tie of 14 points to 14.

The United States won by a score of 15 1/2 to 12 1/2, their first win since 2017.

== Format ==
The competition is a three-day match play event between teams of 12 players with a similar format to the Ryder Cup, with each match worth one point. The format is as follows:

- Day 1 (Friday): Four foursomes (alternate shot) matches in a morning session and four fourball (better ball) matches in an afternoon session. A total of eight players from each team participate in each session.
- Day 2 (Saturday): Four foursomes matches in a morning session and four fourball matches in an afternoon session. A total of eight players from each team participate in each session.
- Day 3 (Sunday): 12 singles matches. All 12 players from each team participate.

With a total of 28 points, 14 1/2 points are required to win the Cup, and 14 points are required for the defending champion to retain the Cup. All matches are played to a maximum of 18 holes. If the score is even after 18 holes, each team earns one-half point.

== Team qualification and selection ==
=== Team Europe ===
In order to be eligible to be a member of the European team, players were required to:

- be current members of the Ladies European Tour in any category or membership;
- have played in eight Ranking Events (excluding the Excluded Championships) during the Qualifying Period as a member of the LET, unless the relevant player has been selected by the appointed captain for the 2023 European Team;
- be a "European national". To be a "European national", the player must satisfy the criteria set out in the "Nationality Policy" issued by the International Golf Federation.

Team Europe was made up of eight automatic qualifiers – the top two players from the LET Solheim Cup standings, followed by the top six LET members on the Women's World Golf Rankings who were not already qualified via the Solheim Cup standings – and four captain's selections.

=== Team USA ===
In order to be eligible to be a member of the United States team, players were required to be current members of the LPGA Tour and meet one of these three citizenship criteria:

- U.S. citizens by birth, regardless of their birthplace.
- Those who were naturalized as U.S. citizens before age 18.
- Those who became U.S. citizens by adoption before age 13.

Team USA was made up of nine automatic qualifiers – the leading seven players from the LPGA Solheim Cup points rankings and the top two players in the Women's World Golf Rankings not already qualified via the points rankings – and three chosen by the team captain. LPGA Solheim Cup points were earned for top-20 finishes on the LPGA Tour over a two-year period.

== Teams ==
2023 captains Stacy Lewis and Suzann Pettersen will reprise their roles at the 2024 cup.

Lewis appointed Morgan Pressel, Angela Stanford, Paula Creamer and Brittany Lincicome assistant captains.

Team USA
Player	Age	Points rank	Rolex ranking	Previous appearances	Matches	W–L–H	Winning percentage
Nelly Korda	26	1	1	3	12	7–4–1	62.50%
Lilia Vu	26	2	2	1	4	1–3–0	25.00%
Lauren Coughlin	31	3	14	0	Rookie		
Ally Ewing	31	4	17	3	12	3–8–1	29.17%
Allisen Corpuz	26	5	28	1	4	2–1–1	62.50%
Megan Khang	26	6	21	3	10	4–3–3	55.00%
Andrea Lee	26	7	43	1	4	1–2–1	37.50%
Rose Zhang	21	9	10	1	3	0–2–1	16.67%
Alison Lee	29	10	25	1	4	1–3–0	25.00%
Sarah Schmelzel (P)	30	11	61	0	Rookie		
Jennifer Kupcho (P)	27	12	53	2	7	2–3–2	42.86%
Lexi Thompson (P)	29	14	46	6	23	9–7–7	54.35%

Pettersen named Anna Nordqvist (playing vice-captain), Laura Davies, Caroline Martens and Mel Reid as her vice captains.

Team Europe
Player	Country	Age	Points rank	Rolex ranking	Previous appearances	Matches	W–L–H	Winning percentage
Charley Hull	England	28	1	11	7	22	12–7–3	61.36%
Esther Henseleit	Germany	25	2	30	0	Rookie		
Céline Boutier	France	30	9	9	3	10	5–4–1	55.00%
Maja Stark	Sweden	24	4	26	1	4	2–1–1	62.50%
Linn Grant	Sweden	25	3	27	1	5	3–2–0	60.00%
Leona Maguire	Ireland	29	20	33	2	10	7–2–1	75.00%
Carlota Ciganda	Spain	34	6	34	6	23	11–8–4	56.52%
Madelene Sagström	Sweden	31	43	39	3	9	3–5–1	38.89%
Georgia Hall (P)	England	28	23	41	4	17	8–7–2	52.94%
Anna Nordqvist (P)	Sweden	37	45	71	8	31	15–13–3	53.23%
Albane Valenzuela (P)	Switzerland	26	48	62	0	Rookie		
Emily Kristine Pedersen (P)	Denmark	28	56	103	3	12	5–6–1	45.83%

Ages on first day of matches, September 13; Rolex rankings at team selection. Captain's picks (P) shown in yellow.

== Day one ==
Friday, September 13, 2024

=== Morning foursomes ===
	Results
Corpuz/Korda	(United States) 3 & 2	Henseleit/Hull
Coughlin/Zhang	(United States) 3 & 2	Boutier/Valenzuela
Ewing/Kupcho	(Europe) 2 up	Pedersen/Stark
Schmelzel/Vu	(United States) 3 & 2	Ciganda/Grant
3	Session	1
3	Overall	1

=== Afternoon four-ball ===
	Results
Korda/Khang	(United States) 6 & 4	Hall/Maguire
Al. Lee/Thompson	(Europe) 6 & 5	Nordqvist/Sagström
Coughlin/Schmelzel	(United States) 3 & 2	Pedersen/Stark
An. Lee/Zhang	(United States) 5 & 4	Grant/Hull
3	Session	1
6	Overall	2

=== Logistical issues ===
The first day of play was overshadowed by major logistical issues that prevented many fans from reaching the course. Robert Trent Jones Golf Club (RTJ) is located in a private residential community served by a single road off U.S. 29. The LPGA, which is responsible for on-site operations when the Solheim Cup is held in the U.S., used Jiffy Lube Live, a nearby concert venue, as a paid parking facility, and intended to shuttle fans to RTJ. However, due to a lack of buses, many spectators were kept in line for hours, and portable bathrooms installed at Jiffy Lube Live were locked. According to one report, the first buses were intended to be loaded at 5:45 am, 15 minutes before the club gates opened, but no buses were present in the parking lot until 6:10 am—and the first three buses were reserved for volunteers who needed to get to their posts. Logistical issues were also evident on the night before play started; after the opening ceremony and a subsequent concert, fans had to wait as long as 2 1/2 hours for buses to take them back to Jiffy Lube Live.

== Day two ==
Saturday, September 14, 2024

=== Morning foursomes ===
	Results
Corpuz/Korda	(United States) 1 up	Ciganda/Pedersen
Ewing/Kupcho	(Europe) 1 up	Henseleit/Hull
Coughlin/Thompson	(United States) 4 & 3	Hall/Stark
Schmelzel/Vu	(Europe) 4 & 3	Boutier/Nordqvist
2	Session	2
8	Overall	4

=== Afternoon four-ball ===
	Results
Khang/Al. Lee	(United States) 4 & 3	Nordqvist/Sagström
An. Lee/Zhang	(United States) 6 & 4	Boutier/Grant
Ewing/Thompson	(Europe) 2 & 1	Ciganda/Pedersen
Corpuz/Vu	(Europe) 2 up	Hall/Hull
2	Session	2
10	Overall	6

== Day three ==
Sunday, September 15, 2024

=== Singles ===
	Results
Nelly Korda	(Europe) 6 & 4	Charley Hull
Megan Khang	(United States) 6 & 5	Emily Kristine Pedersen
Alison Lee	(Europe) 4 & 3	Georgia Hall
Allisen Corpuz	(United States) 4 & 3	Anna Nordqvist
Rose Zhang	(United States) 6 & 4	Carlota Ciganda
Andrea Lee	halved	Esther Henseleit
Lexi Thompson	(Europe) 1 up	Céline Boutier
Lauren Coughlin	halved	Maja Stark
Lilia Vu	halved	Albane Valenzuela
Sarah Schmelzel	(Europe) 1 up	Madelene Sagström
Ally Ewing	(Europe) 4 & 3	Leona Maguire
Jennifer Kupcho	(United States) 2 & 1	Linn Grant
5 1/2	Session	6 1/2
15 1/2	Overall	12 1/2

== Individual player records ==
Each entry refers to the Win–Loss–Half record of the player.

=== United States ===
Player	Points	Overall	Singles	Foursomes	Fourballs
Allisen Corpuz	3	3–1–0	1–0–0	2–0–0	0–1–0
Lauren Coughlin	3.5	3–0–1	0–0–1	2–0–0	1–0–0
Ally Ewing	0	0–4–0	0–1–0	0–2–0	0–1–0
Megan Khang	3	3–0–0	1–0–0	0–0–0	2–0–0
Nelly Korda	3	3–1–0	0–1–0	2–0–0	1–0–0
Jennifer Kupcho	1	1–2–0	1–0–0	0–2–0	0–0–0
Alison Lee	1	1–2–0	0–1–0	0–0–0	1–1–0
Andrea Lee	2.5	2–0–1	0–0–1	0–0–0	2–0–0
Sarah Schmelzel	2	2–2–0	0–1–0	1–1–0	1–0–0
Lexi Thompson	1	1–3–0	0–1–0	1–0–0	0–2–0
Lilia Vu	1.5	1–2–1	0–0–1	1–1–0	0–1–0
Rose Zhang	4	4–0–0	1–0–0	1–0–0	2–0–0

=== Europe ===
Player	Points	Overall	Singles	Foursomes	Fourballs
Céline Boutier	2	2–2–0	1–0–0	1–1–0	0–1–0
Carlota Ciganda	1	1–3–0	0–1–0	0–2–0	1–0–0
Linn Grant	0	0–4–0	0–1–0	0–1–0	0–2–0
Georgia Hall	2	2–2–0	1–0–0	0–1–0	1–1–0
Esther Henseleit	1.5	1–1–1	0–0–1	1–1–0	0–0–0
Charley Hull	3	3–2–0	1–0–0	1–1–0	1–1–0
Leona Maguire	1	1–1–0	1–0–0	0–0–0	0–1–0
Anna Nordqvist	2	2–2–0	0–1–0	1–0–0	1–1–0
Emily Kristine Pedersen	2	2–3–0	0–1–0	1–1–0	1–1–0
Madelene Sagström	2	2–1–0	1–0–0	0–0–0	1–1–0
Maja Stark	1.5	1–2–1	0–0–1	1–1–0	0–1–0
Albane Valenzuela	.5	0–1–1	0–0–1	0–1–0	0–0–0
