= 2023 LPGA Tour =

Professional women's golf tour

2023 LPGA Tour season
- Duration: January 19, 2023 – November 19, 2023
- Number of official events: 34 (2 canceled, now 32)
- Most wins: 4 (France) Céline Boutier, (United States) Lilia Vu
- Race to CME Globe Winner: (United States) Lilia Vu
- Money leader: (United States) Lilia Vu
- Vare Trophy: (Thailand) Atthaya Thitikul
- Rolex Player of the Year: (United States) Lilia Vu
- Rookie of the Year: (South Korea) Ryu Hae-ran

The 2023 LPGA Tour was the 74th edition of the LPGA Tour, a series of professional golf tournaments for elite female golfers from around the world. The season began at the Hilton Grand Vacations Tournament of Champions, in Orlando, Florida on January 19, and officially ended on November 19, at the Tiburón Golf Club in the CME Group Tour Championship at Naples, Florida, not counting the unofficial December 10 Grant Thornton Invitational. The tournaments were sanctioned by the United States-based Ladies Professional Golf Association (LPGA).

== Schedule and results ==
The number in parentheses after each winners' name is the player's total number of wins in official money individual events on the LPGA Tour, including that event. Tournament and winner names in bold indicate LPGA majors. The schedule and purse amount for each tournament is listed on the LPGA website. The LPGA has a standard formula for payout percentages and distribution of its purse and prize money for every event. The winner typically gets 15% of the total, second place gets 9.3%, third place 6.75%, etc.

The total prize money to be won increases to $99.3 million for the 34 now scheduled to be played, $5.4 million more than the $93.9 million in 2022. The net $800,000 increase from the cancellation of the $2.2 million Taiwan Swinging Skirts LPGA to the new $3.0 million Maybank Championship, makes the total purse $100.1 million for 2023. Kroger Queen City Championship (Sep. 10) increased its purse from $1.75 million to $2 million making the total purse now $100.35 million. On June 25, the KPMG Women's PGA Championship announced its purse would increase to $10 million from $9 million and the winner paid $1.5 million, making the total for the season $101.35 million. On July 5, the USGA increased the U.S. Women's Open payout to $11 million, from $10 million (with eventual goal of equal purse with the men) with the winner's share $2 million. This increases the season total to $102.35 million.

Key

Major championships
Regular events

Date	Tournament	Location	Winner(s) (Note: The number in brackets after each winner's name is the number of LPGA Tour events he had won up to and including that tournament. This information is only shown for LPGA Tour members.)	WWGR points	Other tours (Note: JLPGA − LPGA of Japan Tour, LET − Ladies European Tour.)	Purse (US$)	Winner's share ($)
Jan 22	Hilton Grand Vacations Tournament of Champions	Florida	(Canada) Brooke Henderson (13)	24		1,500,000	225,000
Feb 26	Honda LPGA Thailand	Thailand	(United States) Lilia Vu (1)	62		1,700,000	255,000
Mar 5	HSBC Women's World Championship	Singapore	(South Korea) Ko Jin-young (14)	62		1,800,000	270,000
~~Mar 12~~	Blue Bay LPGA	China	Tournament canceled			~~2,100,000~~	
Mar 26	LPGA Drive On Championship	Arizona	(France) Céline Boutier (3)	62		1,750,000	262,500
Apr 2	DIO Implant LA Open	California	(China) Yin Ruoning (1)	62		1,750,000	262,500
Apr 15	Lotte Championship	Hawaii	(Australia) Grace Kim (1)	24		2,000,000	300,000
Apr 23	**Chevron Championship**	Texas	(United States) **Lilia Vu** (2)	100		5,100,000	765,000
Apr 30	JM Eagle LA Championship	California	(Australia) Hannah Green (3)	62		3,000,000	450,000
May 14	Cognizant Founders Cup	New Jersey	(South Korea) Ko Jin-young (15)	62		3,000,000	450,000
May 28	Bank of Hope LPGA Match-Play	Nevada	(Thailand) Pajaree Anannarukarn (2)	28		1,500,000	225,000
Jun 4	Mizuho Americas Open	New Jersey	(United States) Rose Zhang (1)	53		2,750,000	412,500
Jun 11	ShopRite LPGA Classic	New Jersey	(South Africa) Ashleigh Buhai (2)	24		1,750,000	262,500
Jun 18	Meijer LPGA Classic	Michigan	(Republic of Ireland) Leona Maguire (2)	43		2,500,000	375,000
Jun 25	**KPMG Women's PGA Championship**	New Jersey	(China) **Yin Ruoning** (2)	100		10,000,000	1,500,000
Jul 9	**U.S. Women's Open**	California	(United States) **Allisen Corpuz** (1)	100		11,000,000	2,000,000
Jul 16	Dana Open	Ohio	(Sweden) Linn Grant (1)	28		1,750,000	262,500
Jul 22	Dow Great Lakes Bay Invitational	Michigan	(United States) Cheyenne Knight (2) and (United States) Elizabeth Szokol (1)	n/a		2,700,000	328,115 (each)
Jul 30	**Amundi Evian Championship**	France	(France) **Céline Boutier** (4)	100	LET	6,500,000	1,000,000
Aug 6	FreeD Group Women's Scottish Open	Scotland	(France) Céline Boutier (5)	46	LET	2,000,000	300,000
Aug 13	**AIG Women's Open**	England	(United States) **Lilia Vu** (3)	100	LET	9,000,000	1,350,000
Aug 20	ISPS Handa World Invitational	Northern Ireland	(United States) Alexa Pano (1)	17.5	LET	1,500,000	225,000
Aug 27	CPKC Women's Open	Canada	(United States) Megan Khang (1)	62		2,500,000	375,000
Sep 3	Portland Classic	Oregon	(Thailand) Chanettee Wannasaen (1)	62		1,500,000	225,000
Sep 10	Kroger Queen City Championship	Ohio	(Australia) Minjee Lee (9)	40		2,000,000	300,000
Oct 1	Walmart NW Arkansas Championship	Arkansas	(South Korea) Ryu Hae-ran (1)	26		2,300,000	345,000
Oct 8	Volunteers of America Classic	Texas	(South Korea) Kim Hyo-joo (6)	22		1,800,000	270,000
Oct 15	Buick LPGA Shanghai	China	(United States) Angel Yin (1)	28	CLPGA	2,100,000	315,000
Oct 22	BMW Ladies Championship	South Korea	(Australia) Minjee Lee (10)	62		2,200,000	330,000
~~Oct 29~~	Taiwan Swinging Skirts LPGA	Taiwan	Tournament canceled			~~2,200,000~~	
Oct 29	Maybank Championship	Malaysia	(France) Céline Boutier (6)	46		3,000,000	450,000
Nov 5	Toto Japan Classic	Japan	(Japan) Mone Inami (1)	26	JLPGA	2,000,000	300,000
Nov 12	The Annika	Florida	(United States) Lilia Vu (4)	53		3,250,000	487,500
Nov 19	CME Group Tour Championship	Florida	(South Korea) Amy Yang (5)	62		7,000,000	2,000,000

=== Unofficial events ===
The following team events appear on the schedule, but do not carry official money.

Date	Tournament	Location	Winning team	Purse (US$)	Winner's share ($)
May 7	Hanwha LifePlus International Crown	California	Thailand	2,000,000	500,000
Sep 24	Solheim Cup	Spain	Europe (Tied)	n/a	n/a
Dec 10	Grant Thornton Invitational	Florida	(New Zealand) Lydia Ko / (Australia) Jason Day	4,000,000	500,000

== Statistics leaders ==
=== Money list leaders ===
Rank	Player	Events	Prize money ($)
1	(United States) Lilia Vu	19	3,502,303
2	(South Korea) Amy Yang	20	3,165,834
3	(United States) Allisen Corpuz	24	3,094,813
4	(China) Yin Ruoning	21	2,894,677
5	(France) Céline Boutier	22	2,797,054
6	(England) Charley Hull	18	2,395,650
7	(South Korea) Kim Hyo-joo	20	2,123,856
8	(Japan) Nasa Hataoka	23	1,988,216
9	(Japan) Yuka Saso	22	1,822,486
10	(China) Lin Xiyu	21	1,763,385

Source and complete list: LPGA official website.

=== Scoring average ===
Rank	Player	Total strokes	Total rounds	Average
1	(Thailand) Atthaya Thitikul	5,215	75	69.533
2	(South Korea) Kim Hyo-joo	5,431	78	69.628
3	(United States) Lilia Vu	4,468	64	69.813
4	(China) Lin Xiyu	5,306	76	69.816
5	(United States) Nelly Korda	4,750	68	69.853
6	(China) Yin Ruoning	5,386	77	69.948
7	(South Korea) Ko Jin-young	4,759	68	69.985
8	(Sweden) Linn Grant	4,061	58	70.017
9	(Japan) Nasa Hataoka	6,314	90	70.156
10	(Spain) Carlota Ciganda	4,984	71	70.197

Source and complete list: LPGA official website.

== See also ==
- 2023 Ladies European Tour
- 2023 Epson Tour
