= 2024 LPGA Tour =

Professional women's golf tour

2024 LPGA Tour season
- Duration: January 18, 2024 – November 24, 2024
- Number of official events: 33
- Most wins: 7 (United States) Nelly Korda
- Race to CME Globe Winner: (United States) Nelly Korda
- Money leader: (Thailand) Atthaya Thitikul
- Vare Trophy: (Japan) Ayaka Furue
- Rolex Player of the Year: (United States) Nelly Korda
- Rookie of the Year: (Japan) Mao Saigo

The 2024 LPGA Tour was the 75th edition of the LPGA Tour, a series of professional golf tournaments for elite female golfers from around the world. The season began at the Hilton Grand Vacations Tournament of Champions, in Orlando, Florida on January 18, and ended on November 24, at the Tiburón Golf Club in the CME Group Tour Championship at Naples, Florida. The tournaments were sanctioned by the United States-based Ladies Professional Golf Association (LPGA).

Nelly Korda won seven times and was the Player of the Year. Atthaya Thitikul set the single-season earnings record with $6,059,309, aided by the $4 million prize for winning the season-ending CME Group Tour Championship.

== Schedule and results ==
The number in parentheses after each winners' name is the player's total number of wins in official money individual events on the LPGA Tour, including that event. Tournament and winner names in bold indicate LPGA majors. The schedule and purse amount for each tournament is listed on the LPGA website. The LPGA has a standard formula for payout percentages and distribution of its purse and prize money for every event. The winner typically gets 15% of the total, second place gets 9.3%, third place 6.75%, etc.

Total purse for 2024 was $126.3 million.

Key

Major championships
Regular events

Date	Tournament	Location	Winner(s) (Note: The number in brackets after each winner's name is the number of LPGA Tour events he had won up to and including that tournament. This information is only shown for LPGA Tour members.)	WWGR points	Other tours (Note: JLPGA − LPGA of Japan Tour, LET − Ladies European Tour.)	Purse (US$)	Winner's share ($)
Jan 21	Hilton Grand Vacations Tournament of Champions	Florida	(New Zealand) Lydia Ko (20)	31		1,500,000	225,000
Jan 28	LPGA Drive On Championship	Florida	(United States) Nelly Korda (9)	50		1,750,000	262,500
Feb 25	Honda LPGA Thailand	Thailand	(Thailand) Patty Tavatanakit (2)	46		1,700,000	255,000
Mar 3	HSBC Women's World Championship	Singapore	(Australia) Hannah Green (4)	50		1,800,000	270,000
Mar 10	Blue Bay LPGA	China	(United States) Bailey Tardy (1)	26	CLPGA	2,200,000	330,000
Mar 24	Fir Hills Seri Pak Championship	California	(United States) Nelly Korda (10)	56		2,000,000	300,000
Mar 31	Ford Championship	Arizona	(United States) Nelly Korda (11)	62		2,250,000	337,500
Apr 7	T-Mobile Match Play	Nevada	(United States) Nelly Korda (12)	43		2,000,000	300,000
Apr 21	**Chevron Championship**	Texas	(United States) **Nelly Korda** (13)	100		7,900,000	1,200,000
Apr 28	JM Eagle LA Championship	California	(Australia) Hannah Green (5)	53		3,750,000	562,500
May 12	Cognizant Founders Cup	New Jersey	(United States) Rose Zhang (2)	62		3,000,000	450,000
May 19	Mizuho Americas Open	New Jersey	(United States) Nelly Korda (14)	62		3,000,000	450,000
Jun 2	**U.S. Women's Open**	Pennsylvania	(Japan) **Yuka Saso** (2)	100		12,000,000	2,400,000
Jun 9	ShopRite LPGA Classic	New Jersey	(Sweden) Linnea Ström (1)	26		1,750,000	262,500
Jun 16	Meijer LPGA Classic	Michigan	(United States) Lilia Vu (5)	43		3,000,000	450,000
Jun 23	**KPMG Women's PGA Championship**	Washington	(South Korea) **Amy Yang** (6)	100		10,400,000	1,560,000
Jun 30	Dow Championship	Michigan	(Thailand) Atthaya Thitikul (3) and (China) Yin Ruoning (3)	n/a		3,000,000	366,082 (each)
Jul 14	**Amundi Evian Championship**	France	(Japan) **Ayaka Furue** (2)	100	LET	8,000,000	1,200,000
Jul 21	Dana Open	Ohio	(Thailand) Chanettee Wannasaen (2)	19.5		1,750,000	262,500
Jul 28	CPKC Women's Open	Canada	(United States) Lauren Coughlin (1)	37		2,600,000	390,000
Aug 4	Portland Classic	Oregon	(Thailand) Moriya Jutanugarn (3)	19		1,750,000	262,500
Aug 18	ISPS Handa Women's Scottish Open	Scotland	(United States) Lauren Coughlin (2)	53	LET	2,000,000	300,000
Aug 25	**AIG Women's Open**	Scotland	(New Zealand) **Lydia Ko** (21)	100	LET	9,500,000	1,425,000
Sep 1	FM Championship	Massachusetts	(South Korea) Ryu Hae-ran (2)	40		3,800,000	570,000
Sep 22	Kroger Queen City Championship	Ohio	(New Zealand) Lydia Ko (22)	37		2,000,000	300,000
Sep 29	Walmart NW Arkansas Championship	Arkansas	(Thailand) Thidapa Suwannapura (3)	34		3,000,000	450,000
Oct 13	Buick LPGA Shanghai	China	(China) Yin Ruoning (4)	26	CLPGA	2,100,000	315,000
Oct 20	BMW Ladies Championship	South Korea	(Australia) Hannah Green (6)	50		2,200,000	330,000
Oct 27	Maybank Championship	Malaysia	(China) Yin Ruoning (5)	50		3,000,000	450,000
Nov 3	Toto Japan Classic	Japan	(Japan) Rio Takeda (1)	31	JLPGA	2,000,000	300,000
Nov 9	Lotte Championship	Hawaii	(South Korea) Kim A-lim (2)	20.5		3,000,000	450,000
Nov 17	The Annika	Florida	(United States) Nelly Korda (15)	62		3,250,000	487,500
Nov 24	CME Group Tour Championship	Florida	(Thailand) Atthaya Thitikul (4)	62		11,000,000	4,000,000

=== Unofficial events ===
The following events appear on the schedule, but do not carry official money.

Date	Tournament	Location	Winner	WWGR points	Purse (US$)	Winner's share ($)
Aug 11	Olympic Games	France	(New Zealand) Lydia Ko	37	n/a	n/a
Sep 15	Solheim Cup	Virginia	United States	n/a	n/a	n/a
Dec 15	Grant Thornton Invitational	Florida	(Thailand) Patty Tavatanakit / (United States) Jake Knapp	n/a	4,000,000	600,000

== Statistics leaders ==
=== Money list leaders ===
Rank	Player	Events	Prize money ($)
1	(Thailand) Atthaya Thitikul	17	6,059,309
2	(United States) Nelly Korda	16	4,391,930
3	(New Zealand) Lydia Ko	20	3,201,289
4	(Japan) Yuka Saso	22	2,867,618
5	(South Korea) Ryu Hae-ran	26	2,814,903
6	(Japan) Ayaka Furue	24	2,811,824
7	(China) Yin Ruoning	20	2,783,307
8	(United States) Lilia Vu	18	2,088,335
9	(Australia) Hannah Green	20	2,074,873
10	(United States) Lauren Coughlin	25	2,062,822

Source and complete list:

=== Scoring average ===
Rank	Player	Total strokes	Total rounds	Average
1	(Thailand) Atthaya Thitikul	4,021	58	69.33
2	(United States) Nelly Korda	3,965	57	69.56
3	(Japan) Ayaka Furue	6,229	89	69.99
4	(South Korea) Ryu Hae-ran	6,370	91	70.00
5	(China) Yin Ruoning	4,977	71	70.10
6	(Australia) Hannah Green	4,986	71	70.23
7	(New Zealand) Lydia Ko	4,988	71	70.25
8	(Japan) Mao Saigo	6,961	99	70.31
9	(South Korea) Im Jin-hee	6,127	87	70.43
10	(United States) Lauren Coughlin	5,916	84	70.43

Source and complete list:

== See also ==
- 2024 Ladies European Tour
- 2024 Epson Tour
