= Lauren Coughlin =

American professional golfer (born 1992)

Personal information
- Full name: Lauren Elizabeth Coughlin
- Nationality: United States
- Born: September 27, 1992 (age 34) Minneapolis, Minnesota, U.S.
- Height: 5 ft 7 in (1.70 m)

Career
- Sport: Golf
- College: University of Virginia
- Turned professional: 2016
- Current tour: LPGA Tour (joined 2018)
- Former tour: Symetra Tour (joined 2017)
- Professional wins: 5

Number of wins by tour
- LPGA Tour: 3
- Ladies European Tour: 2
- Epson Tour: 1
- Other: 1

Best results in LPGA major championships
- Chevron Championship: T3: 2024
- Women's PGA C'ship: T15: 2023
- U.S. Women's Open: T14: 2026
- Women's British Open: T13: 2025
- Evian Championship: 4th: 2024

Lauren Elizabeth Coughlin (born September 27, 1992) is an American professional golfer who plays on the LPGA Tour. In 2024, she won the Canadian Women's Open and the Women's Scottish Open.

== Early life and amateur career ==
Coughlin was born in Minneapolis, Minnesota, and grew up in Chesapeake, Virginia. She started playing golf at the age of seven, and was named the Chesapeake Scholar Athlete in 2008, 2009 and 2010. She became the first female to play four years on the Hickory High School boys team, and finished runner-up in the Girls Championship of the Virginia State Golf Association in 2009 and 2010.

She won the Virginia Women's Amateur back-to-back in 2012 and 2013. In 2014, she won the Virginia Women's Stroke Play Championship.

Coughlin attended the University of Virginia, first as a walk-on, between 2011 and 2016, where she was named All-American and was 2016 ACC individual champion. After winning the ACC Championship, she moved to 31st in the World Amateur Golf Ranking.

== Professional career ==
Coughlin turned professional in 2016 and started playing on the Symetra Tour, where she won the 2018 PHC Classic in Wisconsin. The win earned her a start in her first major, the 2018 Evian Championship. She joined the LPGA Tour in 2018 after securing her card by finishing in a tie for seventh at the LPGA Final Qualifying Tournament.

In 2022, Coughlin made 13 cuts in 23 starts with a season-best result a tie for sixth at the LPGA Mediheal Championship. In 2023, she made 15 cuts in 23 starts with her best finish a tie for sixth at the CPKC Women's Open in Canada.

In March 2024, Coughlin revealed that her husband John Pond, a former University of Virginia football player, had quit his job to begin an apprenticeship caddying for her full time. A few weeks later she led the 2024 Chevron Championship by two strokes ahead of Nelly Korda after the first round, ultimately finishing in a tie for 3rd, trailing only Korda and Maja Stark. In July 2024, Coughlin won the 2024 CPKC Women's Open. In August 2024, she won the 2024 ISPS Handa Women's Scottish Open. In November 2024, Coughlin won Rolex First-Time Winners award.

== Amateur wins ==
- 2012 Virginia Women's Amateur Championship
- 2013 Virginia Women's Amateur Championship
- 2014 Virginia Women's Stroke Play Championship
- 2016 ACC Championship

== Professional wins (5) ==
=== LPGA Tour wins (3) ===
No.	Date	Tournament	Winning score	To par	Margin of victory	Runner-up
1	Jul 28, 2024	CPKC Women's Open	275	−13	2 strokes	(Japan) Mao Saigo
2	Aug 18, 2024	ISPS Handa Women's Scottish Open^	273	−15	4 strokes	(Germany) Esther Henseleit
3	Apr 5, 2026	Aramco Championship^	281	–7	5 strokes	(United States) Nelly Korda (Republic of Ireland) Leona Maguire

^Co-sanctioned with the Ladies European Tour

=== Symetra Tour wins (1) ===
No.	Date	Tournament	Winning score	To par	Margin of victory	Runner-up
1	Aug 12, 2018	PHC Classic	200	−16	1 stroke	(Philippines) Dottie Ardina

=== Other wins (1) ===
No.	Date	Tournament	Winning score	Margin of victory	Runners-up
1	Dec 14, 2025	Grant Thornton Invitational (with (United States) Andrew Novak)	−28 (57-68-63=188)	3 strokes	(United States) Michael Brennan and (England) Charley Hull, (United States) Chris Gotterup and (United States) Jennifer Kupcho, (United States) Nelly Korda and (United States) Denny McCarthy

== Results in LPGA majors ==
Results not in chronological order.

Tournament	2018	2019	2020	2021	2022	2023	2024	2025	2026
Chevron Championship						CUT	T3	T18	T55
U.S. Women's Open							CUT	CUT	T14
Women's PGA Championship				CUT	T16	T15	T24	CUT	CUT
The Evian Championship	CUT		NT		CUT	CUT	4	CUT	CUT
Women's British Open					CUT	CUT	CUT	T13	T16

Top 10
Did not play

CUT = missed the half-way cut
NT = no tournament
T = tied

== LPGA Tour career summary ==
Year	Tournaments played	Cuts made*	Wins	2nd	3rd	Top 10s	Best finish	Earnings ($)	Money list rank	Scoring average	Scoring rank
2017	2	0	0	0	0	0	CUT	n/a	n/a	74.50	n/a
2018	18	4	0	0	0	0	T50	12,625	154	73.81	154
2019	1	0	0	0	0	0	CUT	0	n/a	74.50	n/a
2020	5	2	0	0	0	0	T34	11,213	149	72.23	n/a
2021	14	9	0	0	0	0	T16	116,113	106	70.63	30
2022	23	12	0	0	0	1	T8	299,990	76	71.51	81
2023	23	15	0	0	0	2	T6	427,256	69	71.21	55
2024	25	19	2	0	1	8	1	2,062,822	10	70.43	10
2025	22	17	0	1	1	5	2	1,009,696	43	70.61	30
Totals^	131 (2018)	78 (2018)	2	1	2	16	1	3,939,715	131		

^ Official as of 2025 season
*Includes matchplay and other tournaments without a cut.

== World ranking ==
Position in Women's World Golf Rankings at the end of each calendar year.

Year	World ranking	Source
2017	889	
2018	452	
2019	431	
2020	409	
2021	270	
2022	166	
2023	109	
2024	15	
2025	22	

== U.S. national team appearances ==
Professional

- Solheim Cup: 2024 (winners), 2026
- International Crown: 2025

=== Solheim Cup record ===
Year	Total matches	Total W–L–H	Singles W–L–H	Foursomes W–L–H	Fourballs W–L–H	Points won	Points %
Career	9	6–1–2	1–0–1	4–0–0	1–1–1	7.0	77.8
2024	4	3–0–1	0–0–1 halved w/ M. Stark	2–0–0 won w/ R. Zhang 3&2 won w/ L. Thompson 4&3	1–0–0 won w/ S. Schmelzel 3&2	3.5	87.5
2026	5	3–1–1	1–0–0 def. L. Maguire 2&1	2–0–0 won w/ Al. Lee 3&2 won w/ Al. Lee 6&5	0–1–1 halved w/ N. Korda lost w/ M. Khang 2&1	3.5	70.0
