= Lilia Vu =

American professional golfer (born 1997)

Personal information
- Full name: Lilia Kha-Tu Du Vu
- Nationality: United States
- Born: October 14, 1997 (age 29) Fountain Valley, California, U.S.
- Height: 5 ft 5 in (165 cm)

Career
- Sport: Golf
- College: UCLA
- Turned professional: 2019
- Current tour: LPGA Tour (joined 2019)
- Former tour: Symetra Tour
- Professional wins: 8

Number of wins by tour
- LPGA Tour: 5
- Ladies European Tour: 1
- Epson Tour: 3

Best results in LPGA major championships (wins: 2)
- Chevron Championship: Won: 2023
- Women's PGA C'ship: T2: 2024
- U.S. Women's Open: T34: 2022
- Women's British Open: Won: 2023
- Evian Championship: T26: 2024

Achievements and awards
- Pac-12 Conference Freshman of the Year: 2016
- Pac-12 Conference Player of the Year: 2018
- WGCA Player of the Year: 2018
- Potawatomi Cup: 2021
- Symetra Tour Player of the Year: 2021
- Rolex Annika Major Award: 2023
- LPGA Tour Player of the Year: 2023
- LPGA Tour Money Winner: 2023
- GWAA Female Player of the Year: 2023

Lilia Kha-Tu Du Vu (born October 14, 1997) is an American professional golfer and LPGA Tour player. She has won eight professional titles, including two majors, with those victories coming at the 2023 Chevron Championship and the 2023 Women's British Open. That same year, she was the LPGA Player of the Year. Vu has represented the United States at two Solheim Cups, winning in 2024.

The daughter of first-generation Vietnamese immigrants, she enrolled at UCLA in 2015, where she went on to rank number one on the all-time UCLA career victories list with eight wins. She reached number one in the World Amateur Golf Rankings, and was on the winning Curtis Cup team in 2018. She first joined the LPGA Tour as a professional in 2019, but dropped off the tour at the end of the year and played on the Symetra Tour instead. She claimed her first three professional victories on the Symetra Tour in 2021 and rejoined the LPGA Tour for 2022. In 2023, she won four titles on the LPGA Tour, including her two major successes, and reached number one in the Women's World Golf Rankings for the first time. She won her fifth LPGA Title at the Meijer LPGA Classic in 2024 and also competed in the Summer Olympics that same year.

== Background, college and amateur career ==
Lilia Kha-Tu Du Vu was born on October, 14, 1997, and was raised in Fountain Valley, California. She began playing golf at age seven after watching her father and older brother at the driving range. Her father acted as her coach, and her brother Andre later played golf for the University of California, Riverside. Vu's maternal grandfather Dinh Du had lived with his family in Can Tho, Vietnam. In search of a better life, he spent several years constructing a boat, and in 1982, Du, his family, and a number of other Viatnamese residents set sail and left the country with 82 people on board. The boat developed a leak, and after releasing a flare, they were picked up by the USS Brewton of the United States Navy. The family eventually reached the United States and settled in California.

Vu was the winner of the 2013 AJGA Junior at Robinson Ranch. In 2014, she won the KNC Champions Junior Classic, which earned her entry into the Kraft Nabisco Championship, where she finished tied-46th. She was victorious at the CIF-WSCGA Championship in 2014, and the SCGA Women's Amateur in 2016, before placing second at the Canadian Women's Amateur in 2017.

Vu enrolled at UCLA in 2015. As a UCLA Bruin, she was awarded 2016 Pac-12 Conference Freshman of the Year, and in 2018 she was WGCA Player of the Year, Pac-12 Conference Golfer of the Year, and a finalist at the Honda Awards. She was also a three-time WGCA First Team All-American and All-Pac 12 performer, and finished top of the all-time UCLA career victory list with eight individual titles.

At the 2018 Curtis Cup, Vu earned four points as the United States defeated Great Britain & Ireland, and she won the 2018 Espirito Santo Trophy in Ireland with Kristen Gillman and Jennifer Kupcho. She was also a member of the team that won the 2018 Arnold Palmer Cup in France. Vu played in the U.S. Women's Open and the ANA Inspiration as an amateur, and at the 2018 ANA Inspiration she was the best placed amateur. She was number one in the World Amateur Golf Ranking for a total of 31 weeks across 2018 and 2019. This ended when she turned professional in January 2019.

== Professional career ==
Vu turned professional in January 2019 and finished tied-27th at the inaugural LPGA Q-Series. This permitted her to enter tournaments on the 2019 LPGA Tour, where she missed the cut in eight out of nine starts. She lost her tour card, and subsequently joined the Symetra Tour (now known as the Epson Tour) for 2020. This initially proved unsuccessful, Vu missed the cut at four of the seven events that she entered during the year and posted a best finish of tied-29th. During this period, Vu almost gave up golf and considered going to law school, but was encouraged to continue the sport by her mother.

In 2021, Vu won three titles on the Symetra Tour and rose into the top 250 in the Women's World Golf Rankings for the first time. In addition to winning the Garden City Charity Classic, the Twin Bridges Championship, and the Four Winds Invitational, she also secured the 2021 Potawatomi Cup. She finished the season first on the money list, winning Symetra Tour Player of the Year honors and earning her LPGA Tour card for 2022.

Vu recorded eight top-10 finishes on the 2022 LPGA Tour. Her first came with a tied-8th place at the JTBC Classic in March, and she recorded a third-place finish at the Bank of Hope LPGA Match-Play in May. She also made her then best result in a major at the Women's PGA Championship in June, where she ended in a tie for tenth. The following month, she finished tied-8th at the Trust Golf Women's Scottish Open. Later in the year, she ended in a tie for third at the AmazingCre Portland Classic in September, before recording further top-10 finishes at the BMW Ladies Championship in October (tied-3rd), and at the Toto Japan Classic in November (tied-10th).

=== 2023: World No. 1, two times major champion ===
Ranked number 33 in the world, Vu secured her first victory on the LPGA Tour, after recording a one-stroke win at the Honda LPGA Thailand in February. She began her final round trailing the leader by six strokes, but shot a final-round 64 to win the event. Vu won her first major at the 2023 Chevron Championship in April. After making birdies on both the 17th and 18th holes of her final round, she reached a playoff where she overcame Angel Yin on the first extra hole. Afterwards, Vu said that in order to help herself cope with her emotions during the tournament, she had used the memory of her late grandfather as an inspiration. In May, she represented the United States at the International Crown, in which they finished in third position.

Vu missed the cut at four of the next six events that she played following her maiden major win, as she initially 'struggled' to adapt to the higher expectations that she faced as a major champion. She then secured her second major with a six-shot victory over Charley Hull in the 2023 Women's British Open at Walton Heath. The win moved her to number one in the Women's World Golf Rankings. In August, Vu received the Rolex Annika Major Award, given to the player with the best combined record at the year's five majors. She became the first American to win the award since Michelle Wie West in 2014.

Vu made her Solheim Cup debut for the United States in September, which was held at Finca Cortesin in Andalusia, Spain. The contest ended in a 14–14 tie with Europe retaining the trophy. Vu posted a 1–3–0 (win–loss–tie) record, with her victory coming in the day three singles where she secured a 4 and 3 success over Madelene Sagstrom. The following month, Vu was beaten by Angel Yin in a playoff at the Buick LPGA Shanghai. In November, Vu claimed her fourth LPGA title of the year with victory at The Annika. The win also took her back up to number one in the world rankings. The following week, she finished fourth at the CME Group Tour Championship, and at the end of the season, she was awarded LPGA Tour Player of the Year. She won more than $3,500,000 in prize money on the 2023 LPGA Tour.

=== 2024: Injury and comeback ===
A back injury hampered Vu in the first half of 2024. She pulled out mid-tournament from both the HSBC Women's World Championship and the Blue Bay LPGA, before choosing to withdraw completely from two majors: the Chevron Championship and the U.S. Women's Open. She returned to competition in June at the Meijer LPGA Classic, having adjusted her swing routine to try and reduce the pain that she had been experiencing. At that tournament, she prevailed in a three-way playoff against Lexi Thompson and Grace Kim to win her first LPGA title of the year. Vu had started her final round eight strokes behind Kim. At the Women's PGA Championship, she finished tied-2nd, three shots behind Amy Yang. She then competed at the Women's British Open as the defending champion. There, she three-putted from fifteen-feet on the final green to end the event in a tie for second, two shots adrift of Lydia Ko.

Vu represented the United States at the 2024 Summer Olympics in August, where she finished tied-36th. In September, she was part of the United States team that won back the Solheim Cup from Europe. The United States secured the trophy with a 15.5–12.5 victory, with Vu ending with a 1–2–1 record. Her victory came in the day one foursomes partnering Sarah Schmelzel, and she halved her match with Albane Valenzuela in the final day singles. Across the LPGA season, Vu made the cut at 16 of the 18 tournaments that she entered and concluded the year with over $2,000,000 in prize money.

=== 2025 ===
At the Ford Championship in March, Vu missed out on the title after being defeated in a playoff by Kim Hyo-joo. She missed her fifth consecutive cut of the year at the Evian Championship in July, and then proceeded to miss the cut at the Women's British Open as well, her fourth missed cut at a major in 2025. In October, Vu was part of the United States team that finished runners-up to Australia at the 2025 International Crown. A further missed cut at The Annika meant she consequently missed out on a place at the CME Group Tour Championship; Vu had needed a high-placed finish to secure a place in the season-ending competition. At the end of the year, she had dropped to 48th in the world rankings, having been fifth one year previously.

== Amateur wins ==
- 2014 KNC Champions Junior Classic
- 2016 Women's Southern California Amateur Championship
- 2017 Battle at the Beach, Pac-12 Championship, Silverado Showdown, Anuenue Spring Break Classic, Bruin Wave Invitational
- 2018 Pac-12 Championship, Arizona Wildcat Invitational, Bruin Wave Invitational, Northrop Grumman Regional Challenge

== Professional wins (8) ==
=== LPGA Tour wins (5) ===
Legend
Major championships (2)
Other LPGA Tour (3)

No.	Date	Tournament	Winning score	To par	Margin of victory	Runner(s)-up	Winner's share ($)	Ref
1	Feb 26, 2023	Honda LPGA Thailand	66-70-66-64=266	−22	1 stroke	(Thailand) Natthakritta Vongtaveelap	255,000	
2	Apr 23, 2023	Chevron Championship	68-69-73-68=278	−10	Playoff	(United States) Angel Yin	765,000	
3	Aug 13, 2023	AIG Women's Open^{[1]}	72-68-67-67=274	−14	6 strokes	(England) Charley Hull	1,350,000	
4	Nov 12, 2023	The Annika	67-66-62-66=261	−19	3 strokes	(United States) Alison Lee (Spain) Azahara Muñoz	487,500	
5	Jun 16, 2024	Meijer LPGA Classic	69-70-68-65=272	−16	Playoff	(Australia) Grace Kim (United States) Lexi Thompson	450,000	

^{1} Co-sanctioned by the Ladies European Tour.

LPGA Tour playoff record (2–2)

No.	Year	Tournament	Opponent(s)	Result	Ref
1	2023	Chevron Championship	(United States) Angel Yin	Won with birdie on first extra hole	
2	2023	Buick LPGA Shanghai	(United States) Angel Yin	Lost to birdie on first extra hole	
3	2024	Meijer LPGA Classic	(Australia) Grace Kim (United States) Lexi Thompson	Won with birdie on third extra hole	
4	2025	Ford Championship	(South Korea) Kim Hyo-joo	Lost to birdie on first extra hole	

=== Symetra Tour wins (3) ===
No.	Date	Tournament	Winning score	Margin of victory	Runner-up	Ref
1	May 2, 2021	Garden City Charity Classic	−8 (69-70-69=208)	1 stroke	(United States) Beth Wu	
2	Jul 25, 2021	Twin Bridges Championship	−8 (70-67-68=205)	2 strokes	(United States) Rachel Rohanna	
3	Aug 15, 2021	Four Winds Invitational	−12 (68-69-67=204)	2 strokes	(China) Ruixin Liu	

== Results in LPGA majors ==
=== Wins (2) ===
Year	Championship	54 holes	Winning score	Margin	Runner-up	Ref
2023	Chevron Championship	4 shot deficit	−10 (68-69-73-68=278)	Playoff	(United States) Angel Yin	
2023	Women's British Open	Tied for lead	−14 (72-68-67-67=274)	6 strokes	(England) Charley Hull	

=== Results timeline ===
Results not in chronological order.

Tournament	2014	2015	2016	2017	2018	2019	2020	2021	2022	2023	2024	2025	2026
Chevron Championship	T46				T40LA				CUT	1		78	CUT
U.S. Women's Open		CUT							T34	CUT		CUT	CUT
Women's PGA Championship									T10	CUT	T2	CUT	CUT
The Evian Championship							NT		CUT	T42	T26	CUT	CUT
Women's British Open									T41	1	T2	CUT	CUT

Win
Top 10
Did not play

CUT = missed the half-way cut
WD = withdrew
NT = no tournament
T = tied

=== Summary ===
Tournament	Wins	2nd	3rd	Top-5	Top-10	Top-25	Events	Cuts made
Chevron Championship	1	0	0	1	1	1	6	4
U.S. Women's Open	0	0	0	0	0	0	5	1
Women's PGA Championship	0	1	0	1	2	2	5	2
The Evian Championship	0	0	0	0	0	0	5	2
Women's British Open	1	1	0	2	2	2	5	3
Totals	2	2	0	4	5	5	26	12

- Most consecutive cuts made – 6 (2023 Evian – 2025 Chevron)
- Longest streak of top-10s – 2 (2023 Women's British – 2024 Women's PGA)

== LPGA Tour career summary ==
Year	Tournaments played	Cuts made*	Wins (Majors)	2nd	3rd	Top 10s	Best finish	Earnings ($)	Money list rank	Scoring average	Scoring rank
2019	9	2	0	0	0	0	T72	3,830	176	74.88	n/a
2020	Did not play										
2021	Did not play										
2022	24	22	0	0	3	8	3	918,939	30	70.20	20
2023	19	15	4 (2)	1	0	7	1	3,502,303	1	69.81	3
2024	18	16	1	2	0	4	1	2,088,335	8	70.48	13
2025	19	8	0	1	0	1	2	269,408	89	72.93	138
Totals^	89	63	5 (2)	4	3	20	1	6,782,815	64		

^ Official as of 2025 season
*Includes matchplay and other tournaments without a cut.

== World ranking ==
Position in Women's World Golf Rankings at the end of each calendar year.

Year	Ranking	Source
2014	548	
2015	921	
2016	n/a	
2017	n/a	
2018	623	
2019	1,007	
2020	n/a	
2021	244	
2022	43	
2023	1	
2024	5	
2025	48	

== U.S. national team appearances ==
Amateur

- Curtis Cup: 2018 (winners)
- Arnold Palmer Cup: 2018 (winners)
- Espirito Santo Trophy: 2018 (winners)

Professional

- International Crown: 2023, 2025
- Solheim Cup: 2023, 2024 (winners)

=== Solheim Cup record ===
Year	Total matches	Total W–L–H	Singles W–L–H	Foursomes W–L–H	Fourballs W–L–H	Points won	Points %
Career	8	2–5–1	1–0–1	1–2–0	0–3–0	2.5	31.3
2023	4	1–3–0	1–0–0 def. M. Sagström 4&3	0–1–0 lost w/ J. Kupcho 2&1	0–2–0 lost w/ L. Thompson 1 dn lost w/ D. Kang 2&1	1.0	25.0
2024	4	1–2–1	0–0–1 halved w/ A. Valenzuela	1–1–0 won w/ S. Schmelzel 3&2 lost w/ S. Schmelzel 4&3	0–1–0 lost w/ A. Corpuz 1 dn	1.5	37.5
