= Megan Khang =

American professional golfer (born 1997)

Personal information
- Nationality: United States
- Born: October 23, 1997 (age 29) Brockton, Massachusetts, U.S.
- Height: 5 ft 1 in (155 cm)

Career
- Sport: Golf
- Turned professional: 2015
- Current tour: LPGA Tour
- Professional wins: 4

Number of wins by tour
- LPGA Tour: 1
- Other: 3

Best results in LPGA major championships
- Chevron Championship: T9: 2023
- Women's PGA C'ship: T3: 2023
- U.S. Women's Open: T4: 2021
- Women's British Open: T6: 2025
- Evian Championship: T8: 2019

Megan Khang (born October 23, 1997) is an American professional golfer. She plays on the LPGA Tour and is the first player of Hmong descent to do so.

Khang's parents were refugees from the Vietnam War from Laos and came to the United States with their respective families in the 1970s. Khang was born in Brockton, Massachusetts in 1997, grew up in Rockland, Massachusetts and learned the sport from her father. She qualified for the 2012 U.S. Women's Open at the age of 14. She won several events as a junior golfer and played on the United States Junior Solheim Cup team in 2015.

Khang finished T-6 at the LPGA Final Qualifying Tournament in 2015 to earn her LPGA Tour card for the 2016 season. She has maintained her card ever since. Her first LPGA Tour win came in her 191st start on August 27, 2023, in a playoff at the CPKC Women's Open over Ko Jin-young.

She is a five-time member of the United States Solheim Cup team.

== Personal life ==
Khang is good friends with actress Kathryn Newton, as they were competing against each other at AJGA events when they were juniors. Newton would play golf right up until graduating high school when she pivoted to focus on her acting career.

== Amateur wins ==
- 2012 Northern Junior Championship
- 2013 PING Invitational, Faldo Series Grand Final
- 2014 Faldo Series Grand Final, Doral-Publix Junior Classic
- 2015 Eastern Amateur Championship

== Professional wins (4) ==
=== LPGA Tour wins (1) ===
No.	Date	Tournament	Winning score	To par	Margin of victory	Runner-up	Winner's share ($)
1	Aug 27, 2023	CPKC Women's Open	71-66-68-74=279	−9	Playoff	(South Korea) Ko Jin-young	375,000

LPGA Tour playoff record (1–1)

No.	Year	Tournament	Opponents	Result
1	2023	CPKC Women's Open	(South Korea) Ko Jin-young	Won with par on first extra hole
2	2025	Dow Championship (with (United States) Lexi Thompson)	(South Korea) Im Jin-hee and (South Korea) Lee So-mi	Lost to birdie on first extra hole

=== Other wins (3) ===
- 2012 Connecticut Women's Open (as an amateur)
- 2013 Connecticut Women's Open (as an amateur)
- 2015 Connecticut Women's Open (as an amateur)

== Results in LPGA majors ==
Results not in chronological order.

Tournament	2012	2013	2014	2015	2016	2017	2018	2019	2020
Chevron Championship					CUT	T47	CUT	T26	T59
Women's PGA Championship					CUT	CUT	CUT	T10	CUT
U.S. Women's Open	CUT		CUT	T35LA	CUT	T27	T10	T39	5
The Evian Championship					T22	T58	T24	T8	NT
Women's British Open					T11	T49	CUT	T44	T22

Tournament	2021	2022	2023	2024	2025	2026
Chevron Championship	T10	CUT	T9	CUT	T40	T34
U.S. Women's Open	T4	T8	CUT	T44	CUT	CUT
Women's PGA Championship	T27	CUT	T3	CUT	T52	66
The Evian Championship	CUT	T43	T9	CUT	T21	CUT
Women's British Open	T39	T28	T30	CUT	T6	CUT

Top 10
Did not play

LA = low amateur
CUT = missed the half-way cut
NT = no tournament
"T" = tied

=== Summary ===
Tournament	Wins	2nd	3rd	Top-5	Top-10	Top-25	Events	Cuts made
Chevron Championship	0	0	0	0	2	2	11	7
U.S. Women's Open	0	0	0	2	4	4	14	8
Women's PGA Championship	0	0	1	1	2	2	11	5
The Evian Championship	0	0	0	0	2	5	10	7
Women's British Open	0	0	0	0	1	3	11	8
Totals	0	0	1	3	11	16	57	35

- Most consecutive cuts made – 8 (2018 Evian – 2020 ANA)
- Longest streak of top-10s – 3 (2020 U.S. Open – 2021 U.S. Open)

== LPGA Tour career summary ==
Year	Tournaments played	Cuts made*	Wins	2nds	3rds	Top 10s	Best finish	Earnings ($)	Money list rank	Scoring average	Scoring rank
2012	1	0	0	0	0	0	MC	n/a	n/a	77.50	n/a
2013	Did not play										
2014	1	0	0	0	0	0	MC	n/a	n/a	77.00	n/a
2015	2	2	0	0	0	0	T35	n/a	n/a	71.25	n/a
2016	28	17	0	0	0	2	T4	336,016	57	72.02	70
2017	32	23	0	0	1	4	T3	456,319	43	71.04	40
2018	29	21	0	0	0	6	T4	614,164	35	71.44	49
2019	24	20	0	0	0	7	T4	646,367	32	70.70	25
2020	14	13	0	0	0	1	5	377,242	30	71.56	41
2021	20	18	0	0	0	4	T4	723,799	26	70.47	26
2022	24	20	0	1	0	6	2	1,025,005	26	70.15	17
2023	21	19	1	0	1	7	1	1,486,310	18	70.25	12
2024	22	16	0	1	2	5	T2	789,775	52	70.86	23
2025	20	16	0	1	1	5	2	1,148,120	36	70.92	46
Totals^	234 (2016)	183 (2016)	1	3	5	47	1	7,603,117	50		

^ official as of 2025 season
* Includes matchplay and other tournaments without a cut.

== World ranking ==
Position in Women's World Golf Rankings at the end of each calendar year.

Year	Ranking	Source
2015	478	
2016	74	
2017	94	
2018	66	
2019	44	
2020	49	
2021	36	
2022	28	
2023	14	
2024	21	
2025	39	

== U.S. national team appearances ==
Amateur

- Junior Solheim Cup: 2015 (winners)

Professional

- Solheim Cup: 2019, 2021, 2023, 2024 (winners), 2026

=== Solheim Cup record ===
Year	Total matches	Total W–L–H	Singles W–L–H	Foursomes W–L–H	Fourballs W–L–H	Points won	Points %
Career	16	8–5–3	3–1–1	2–2–1	3–2–1	9.5	59.4
2019	3	0–2–1	0–0–1 halved w/ C. Hull	0–2–0 lost w/ A. Park 2&1 lost w/ D. Kang 4&3	0–0–0	0.5	16.7
2021	3	1–1–1	1–0–0 def. S. Popov 3&2	0–0–1 halved w/ A. Ewing	0–1–0 lost w/ J. Korda 1 dn	1.5	50.0
2023	4	3–0–1	1–0–0 def. L. Grant 1 up	2–0–0 won w/ L. Thompson 2&1 won w/ L. Thompson 1 up	0–0–1 halved w/ R. Zhang	3.5	87.5
2024	3	3–0–0	1–0–0 def. E. Pedersen 6&5	0–0–0	2–0–0 won w/ N. Korda 6&4 won w/ Al. Lee 4&3	3.0	100.0
2026	3	1–2–0	0–1–0 lost to C. Hull 3&2	0–0–0	1–1–0 won w/ Al. Lee 5&3 lost w/ L. Coughlin 2&1	1.0	33.3
