= Lauren Hartlage =

American professional golfer (born 1998)

Personal information
- Nationality: United States
- Born: January 31, 1998 (age 28) Elizabethtown, Kentucky, U.S.

Career
- Sport: Golf
- College: University of Louisville
- Turned professional: 2021
- Current tour: LPGA Tour (joined 2022)

Best results in LPGA major championships
- Chevron Championship: CUT: 2023
- Women's PGA C'ship: T5: 2024
- U.S. Women's Open: T51: 2022
- Women's British Open: CUT: 2024
- Evian Championship: T65: 2024

Achievements and awards
- Kentucky Golf Coaches Association Kentucky Player of the Year: 2013, 2014, 2015
- Kentucky Golf Foundation Junior Player of the Year: 2015
- Atlantic Coast Conference Freshman of the Year: 2017
- Edith Cummings Munson Golf Award: 2020

Lauren Hartlage (born January 31, 1998) is an American professional golfer and member of the LPGA Tour. She was in contention at the 2024 Women's PGA Championship, where she ultimately finished tied 5th.

== Early life and amateur career ==
Hartlage played golf at Elizabethtown High School under coach Kim, her mother, who played college golf at Western Kentucky University. She was a three-time Kentucky Golf Coaches Association Region Player of the Year between 2013 and 2015, and recognized as the Kentucky Golf Foundation's 2015 Kentucky Junior Player of the Year.

She attended the University of Louisville between 2016 and 2020, majoring in finance. Playing with the Louisville Cardinals women's golf team she won two tournaments and was named Atlantic Coast Conference Freshman of the Year.

Hartlage participated in the inaugural Augusta National Women's Amateur, and reached matchplay at the 2018 British Ladies Amateur and the 2019 U.S. Women's Amateur.

She represented the United States at the 2021 Arnold Palmer Cup, where she beat Ingrid Lindblad, 1 up, in the final Sunday singles match to cement the U.S. victory.

== Professional career ==
Hartlage turned professional in August 2021. She finished second at the 2021 Delta Downs Invitational on the Women's All Pro Tour, before finishing T26 at Q-Series to earn LPGA Tour membership for 2022.

In her rookie season on the LPGA Tour, her best finish was a T10 at the Dow Great Lakes Bay Invitational. In 2023, she finished T6 at the Lotte Championship. In 2024, she was in contention at the Women's PGA Championship, where she ultimately finished tied 5th after sitting in second place ahead of the final round.

== Amateur wins ==
- 2014 Under Armour Jeff Overton Championship
- 2015 Under Armour Jeff Overton Championship, PGA Junior Series Kearney Hill Golf Links
- 2017 Cardinal Cup
- 2019 Moon Golf Invitational
- 2020 Women's Orlando International Amateur Championship, Golfweek Purdue Amateur

== Results in LPGA majors ==
Results not in chronological order.

Tournament	2022	2023	2024	2025
Chevron Championship		CUT		
U.S. Women's Open	T51			
Women's PGA Championship		CUT	T5	T75
The Evian Championship		CUT	T65	
Women's British Open			CUT	

Top 10
Did not play

CUT = missed the half-way cut
T= tied

== U.S. national team appearances ==
Amateur

- Arnold Palmer Cup: 2021 (winners)
