= Sarah Schmelzel =

American professional golfer (born 1994)

Personal information
- Full name: Sarah Hawley Schmelzel
- Nationality: United States
- Born: May 12, 1994 (age 32) Phoenix, Arizona, U.S.
- Height: 5 ft 7 in (170 cm)

Career
- Sport: Golf
- College: University of South Carolina
- Turned professional: 2016
- Current tour: LPGA Tour (joined 2019)
- Former tour: Symetra Tour (joined 2017)

Best results in LPGA major championships
- Chevron Championship: T6: 2025
- Women's PGA C'ship: T9: 2024
- U.S. Women's Open: T14: 2025
- Women's British Open: T29: 2024
- Evian Championship: T28: 2023

Sarah Hawley Schmelzel (born May 12, 1994) is an American professional golfer and LPGA Tour member.

== Early life, college and amateur career ==
Schmelzel grew up in Phoenix, Arizona. Although she started playing golf when she was five, Schmelzel first competed in gymnastics. She was a talented at uneven bars and was an Arizona State Champion in the discipline. In 2001, she watched Annika Sörenstam card a 59 at her home course of Moon Valley, which sparked a passion for the game.

Schmelzel was highly ranked in both the National Junior Golf Scoreboard rankings and the Golfweek junior rankings. She was a standout at Xavier Prep and won the 2011 Arizona State High School Championship. Schmelzel led her school to its third team state title in four years, and carded rounds of 71-66 at the state championship to tie the Arizona state high school record with Amanda Blumenherst. She won the AJGA Bass Pro Shops/Payne Stewart Championship by 12 strokes with rounds of 69-71-70.

Schmelzel attended the University of South Carolina between 2012 and 2016 and played on the South Carolina Gamecocks women's golf team, where she captured one individual title. She was on the Southeastern Conference All-Freshman Team and was an honorable mention All-American as a senior.

== Professional career ==
Schmelzel turned professional after graduating and joined the 2017 Symetra Tour. In her second season, she recorded seven top-10 finishes, including four top-five results in her last five events to finish 13th on the Epson Tour money list. She finished third at the inaugural LPGA Q-Series to earn her LPGA Tour card for the 2019 season.

In 2021, Schmelzel finished tied 17th at the Bank of Hope LPGA Match-Play, after her opponent Carlota Ciganda was assessed a slow-play penalty. Ciganda and Schmelzel came to the 18th hole tied, but as the slow-play penalty in match play is loss of hole, Schmelzel was awarded the hole, and won the match 1-up.

In 2022, Schmelzel made six birdies in her final seven holes to jump up the leaderboard into solo third at the LPGA Drive On Championship, her career-best finish on the LPGA Tour so far.

On March 10, 2024, she had her best finish, second-place at the Blue Bay LPGA tournament, with a 273 (−15) to first-time LPGA winner Bailey Tardy who shot a new tournament record 269 (−19). Schmelzel earned $208,128 to the winner's $330,000.

In September 2025, Schmelzel had an unofficial shared LPGA Tour win with Minami Katsu at the Walmart NW Arkansas Championship when the tournament was shortened to only 18 holes due to heavy rainfall causing the course to be unplayable. Schmelzel and Katsu shot 8-under 63 during the tournament's only round.

== Amateur wins ==
- 2005 Kingman City Junior Championship
- 2006 Mesa City Junior Championship, Yuma City Junior Championship, Tucson Conquistadores Spring Classic
- 2007 Yuma City Junior Championship, JGAA Winter Classic
- 2008 Antigua/Milt Coggins Arizona Junior Championship, Yuma City Junior Championship, Tucson Conquistadores Spring Classic, JGAA Fall Classic
- 2009 Yuma City Junior Championship, Thunderbird Invitational
- 2011 Arizona State High School Championship, Pro Shops/Payne Stewart Championship
- 2016 Bryan National Collegiate

== Results in LPGA majors ==
Tournament	2019	2020	2021	2022	2023	2024	2025
Chevron Championship	T75	T44	T25		66	CUT	T6
U.S. Women's Open	CUT	T23	CUT			CUT	T14
Women's PGA Championship	T14	T54	CUT	CUT	T15	T9	CUT
The Evian Championship	CUT	NT	CUT	T65	T28	T44	T49
Women's British Open	T51		CUT	T48	CUT	T29	T36

Top 10
Did not play

CUT = missed the half-way cut
NT = no tournament
T = tied

=== Summary ===
Tournament	Wins	2nd	3rd	Top-5	Top-10	Top-25	Events	Cuts made
Chevron Championship	0	0	0	0	1	2	6	5
U.S. Women's Open	0	0	0	0	0	2	5	2
Women's PGA Championship	0	0	0	0	1	3	7	4
The Evian Championship	0	0	0	0	0	0	6	4
Women's British Open	0	0	0	0	0	0	6	4
Totals	0	0	0	0	2	7	30	19

- Most consecutive cuts made – 5 (twice)
- Longest streak of top-10s – 1 (twice)

== LPGA Tour career summary ==
Year	Tournaments played	Cuts made*	Wins	2nds	3rds	Top 10s	Best finish	Earnings ($)	Money list rank	Scoring average	Scoring rank
2019	25	20	0	0	0	1	6	251,284	68	71.72	82
2020	15	12	0	0	0	1	T6	198,601	61	71.35	29
2021	25	16	0	0	0	1	T6	264,797	68	71.32	66
2022	24	20	0	0	1	3	3	584,376	53	70.76	38
2023	27	20	0	0	0	2	T10	477,734	59	71.13	50
2024	26	19	0	1	0	7	2	928,966	39	71.09	41
2025	24	21	0	0	0	3	5/T5	971,644	45	70.88	43
Totals^	166	128	0	1	1	18	2	3,677,402	135		

Official as of 2025 season
* Includes matchplay and other tournaments without a cut.

== World ranking ==
Position in Women's World Golf Rankings at the end of each calendar year.

Year	World ranking	Source
2018	382	
2019	142	
2020	115	
2021	131	
2022	83	
2023	100	
2024	71	
2025	63	

== U.S. national team appearances ==
Professional

- Solheim Cup: 2024 (winners)

=== Solheim Cup record ===
Year	Total Matches	Total W–L–H	Singles W–L–H	Foursomes W–L–H	Fourballs W–L–H	Points Won	Points %
Career	4	2–2–0	0–1–0	1–1–0	1–0–0	2	50.0
2024	4	2–2–0	0–1–0 lost to M. Sagström 1 dn	1–1–0 won w/ L. Vu 3&2 lost w/ L. Vu 4&3	1–0–0 won w/ L. Coughlin 3&2	2	50.0
