= Alison Lee =

American professional golfer (born 1995)

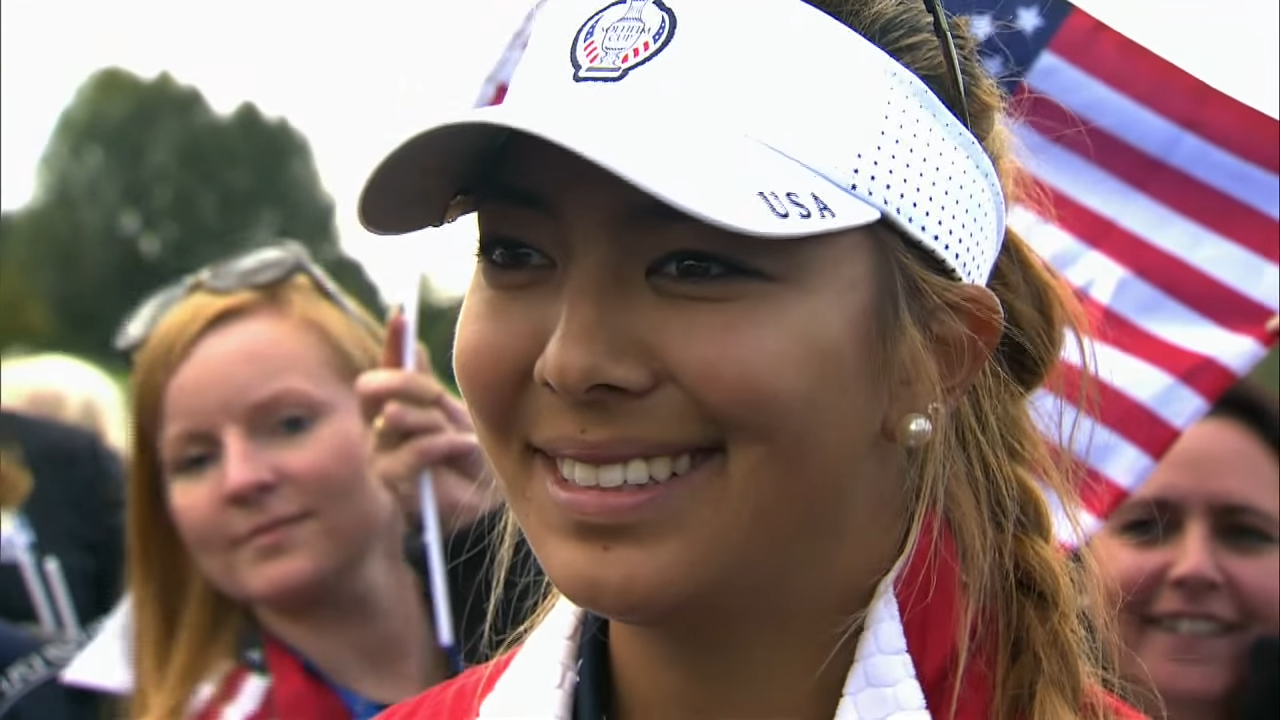
- Lee at the 2015 Solheim Cup

Personal information
- Nationality: United States
- Born: February 26, 1995 (age 31) Los Angeles, California, U.S.
- Height: 5 ft 9 in (1.75 m)

Career
- Sport: Golf
- College: UCLA
- Turned professional: 2014
- Current tour: LPGA Tour (joined 2015)
- Professional wins: 2

Number of wins by tour
- Ladies European Tour: 2

Best results in LPGA major championships
- Chevron Championship: T8: 2022
- Women's PGA C'ship: T5: 2026
- U.S. Women's Open: T14: 2026
- Women's British Open: T11: 2023
- Evian Championship: T6: 2015

Alison Lee (born February 26, 1995) is an American professional golfer. She plays on the LPGA Tour and was a college student at the University of California, Los Angeles. She was ranked #1 in the World Amateur Golf Ranking for 16 weeks in 2013–14.

== Early life and amateur career ==
In 1995, Lee was born in Los Angeles, California to Korean immigrant parents. She started golfing at a young age. Lee's father Johnny Lee was her first instructor.

Lee was an AJGA First-Team All-American for six years, from 2008 through 2013, with nine wins on the AJGA circuit. She was a member of the victorious USA Junior Solheim Cup team in 2009, 2011, and 2013 helping to lead the US to three straight victories and was a member of the Junior Ryder Cup team in 2010 and 2012 and the Curtis Cup team in 2014.

Lee played one season and a half of golf at UCLA, before turning pro in December of her sophomore year. She remained a student at the university, however, during much of her pro career.

== Professional career ==
In December 2014, Lee turned professional. She joined the LPGA Tour after winning the final stage of the LPGA Qualifying Tournament.

In her rookie season, she qualified for the United States Solheim Cup team, based on her world ranking.

== Amateur wins ==
- 2010 Winn Grips Heather Farr Classic, Mission Hills Desert Junior
- 2011 Los Angeles City Junior Girls
- 2012 Annika Invitational, Ping Invitational
- 2013 Rolex Junior Championship, Club Corp Mission Hills Desert Junior, Rolex Tournament of Champions, Betsy Rawls Longhorn Invite, Stanford Intercollegiate
- 2014 PAC-12 Championship, North and South Women's Amateur, Nanea PAC-12 Preview

== Professional wins (2) ==
=== Ladies European Tour wins (2) ===
No.	Date	Tournament	Winning score	To par	Margin of victory	Runner-up
1	7 Aug 2021	Aramco Team Series – Sotogrande (individual event)	65-65-71=201	−15	5 strokes	(South Africa) Ashleigh Buhai
2	29 Oct 2023	Aramco Team Series – Riyadh (individual event)	61-61-65=187	−29	8 strokes	(Spain) Carlota Ciganda

LPGA Tour playoff record (0–2)

No.	Year	Tournament	Opponent(s)	Result
1	2016	LPGA KEB–Hana Bank Championship	(Spain) Carlota Ciganda	Lost to birdie on first extra hole
2	2023	BMW Ladies Championship	(Australia) Minjee Lee	Lost to birdie on first extra hole

== Results in LPGA majors ==
Results not in chronological order.

Tournament	2009	2010	2011	2012
Chevron Championship				CUT
U.S. Women's Open	T26	CUT		T60
Women's PGA Championship				
Women's British Open				

Tournament	2013	2014	2015	2016	2017	2018	2019	2020	2021	2022	2023	2024	2025	2026
Chevron Championship		T29	T35	73	T27		T44			T8	CUT	CUT		CUT
U.S. Women's Open			T26	CUT	CUT				T16	T40	WD	T44		T14
Women's PGA Championship			T62	T64	T50		CUT	T69	T27	T30	T52	CUT		T5
The Evian Championship ^			T6	T43	CUT			NT	T65	T50	T20	T22		T41
Women's British Open			CUT	T31	T43			T29	CUT	T15	T11	T29		T65

^ The Evian Championship was added as a major in 2013.

Top 10
Did not play

CUT = missed the half-way cut
WD = withdrew
NT = no tournament
T = tied

=== Summary ===
Tournament	Wins	2nd	3rd	Top-5	Top-10	Top-25	Events	Cuts made
Chevron Championship	0	0	0	0	1	1	10	6
U.S. Women's Open	0	0	0	0	0	2	11	7
Women's PGA Championship	0	0	0	1	1	1	10	8
The Evian Championship	0	0	0	0	1	3	8	7
Women's British Open	0	0	0	0	0	2	9	7
Totals	0	0	0	1	3	9	48	35

- Most consecutive cuts made – 5 (three times)
- Longest streak of top-10s – 1 (three times)

== LPGA Tour career summary ==
Year	Tournaments played	Cuts made *	Wins	2nds	3rds	Top 10s	Best finish	Earnings ($)	Money list rank	Scoring average	Scoring rank
2009	1	1	0	0	0	0	T26	n/a	n/a	73.25	n/a
2010	1	0	0	0	0	0	n/a	n/a	n/a	77.50	n/a
2011	0	0	0	0	0	0	n/a	n/a	n/a	n/a	n/a
2012	2	1	0	0	0	0	T60	n/a	n/a	76.83	n/a
2013	0	0	0	0	0	0	0	n/a	n/a	n/a	n/a
2014	1	1	0	0	0	0	T29	n/a	n/a	72.50	n/a
2015	23	19	0	0	1	6	3	628,676	23	70.73	14
2016	22	14	0	1	0	5	2	470,783	38	72.05	71
2017	22	15	0	0	0	0	T17	155,163	86	71.46	58
2018	16	4	0	0	0	0	T42	12,054	155	74.64	161
2019	18	9	0	0	0	0	T11	114,361	105	71.70	81
2020	8	4	0	0	0	0	T29	53,301	106	72.83	97
2021	17	13	0	0	0	1	9	316,076	63	70.80	40
2022	24	22	0	0	0	4	T5	688,430	43	70.62	31
2023	23	20	0	3	0	5	2	1,411,998	19	70.47	23
2024	19	13	0	0	1	4	T3	541,282	71	72.23	112
2025	2	1	0	0	0	0	MC	0	n/a	73.25	n/a
Totals^	194 (2015)	134 (2015)	0	4	2	25	2	4,392,124	111		

^ Official as of 2025 season
* Includes matchplay and other tournaments without a cut.

== World ranking ==
Position in Women's World Golf Rankings at the end of each calendar year.

Year	Ranking	Source
2009	364	
2010	531	
2011	–	
2012	584	
2013	755	
2014	483	
2015	23	
2016	34	
2017	91	
2018	353	
2019	210	
2020	186	
2021	89	
2022	89	
2023	20	
2024	35	
2025	252	

== U.S. national team appearances ==
Amateur

- Junior Solheim Cup: 2009 (winners), 2011 (tie, Cup retained), 2013 (winners)
- Junior Ryder Cup: 2010 (winners), 2012 (winners)
- Curtis Cup: 2014 (winners)
- Espirito Santo Trophy: 2014

Professional

- Solheim Cup: 2015 (winners), 2024 (winners), 2026

=== Solheim Cup record ===
Year	Total Matches	Total W–L–H	Singles W–L–H	Foursomes W–L–H	Fourballs W–L–H	Points Won	Points %
Career	11	6–5–0	2–1–0	2–1–0	2–3–0	6	54.5
2015	4	1–3–0	1–0–0 def. G. Nocera 3&1	0–1–0 lost w/ M. Wie 4&3	0–2–0 lost w/ A. Stanford 3&2, lost w/ B. Lincicome 2 dn	1	25.0
2024	3	1–2–0	0–1–0 lost to G. Hall 4&3	0–0–0	1–1–0 lost w/ L. Thompson 6&5 won w/ M. Khang 4&3	1	33.3
2026	4	4–0–0	1–0–0 def. E. Henseleit 1 up	2–0–0 won w/ L. Coughlin 3&2 won w/ L. Coughlin 4&3	1–0–0 won w/ M. Khang 5&3	4	100.0
