= 2013 CME Group Titleholders =

Tournament information
- Dates: November 21–24, 2013
- Location: Naples, Florida; 26.248°N 81.765°W
- Courses: Tiburón Golf Club, Gold Course
- Tour: LPGA Tour

Statistics
- Par: 72
- Length: 7,271 yards (6,649 m)
- Field: 70 players
- Cut: none
- Prize fund: $2.0 million
- Winner's share: $700,000

Champion
- (China) Shanshan Feng
- 273 (−15)

Location map
- Location in the United States Location in Florida

The 2013 CME Group Titleholders was the third CME Group Titleholders, a women's professional golf tournament and the season-ending event on the U.S.-based LPGA Tour. It was played November 21–24 at the Gold Course of Tiburón Golf Club in Naples, Florida.

The top three finishers who were LPGA members from each official LPGA tournament, not otherwise qualified, earned a spot in the Titleholders. If tied, the player with the lower final round score qualified.

Shanshan Feng posted rounds of 67 and 66 on the weekend to win with a score of 273 (−15), one stroke ahead of runner-up Gerina Piller. The winner's share was the largest of the year at $700,000, 35% of the $2 million purse.

== Qualifiers ==
Dates	Tournament	1st Qualifier	2nd Qualifier	3rd Qualifier
Feb 17	ISPS Handa Women's Australian Open	(South Korea) Jiyai Shin (Win)	(Taiwan) Yani Tseng (2nd)	(Thailand) Moriya Jutanugarn (T4)
Feb 24	Honda LPGA Thailand	(South Korea) Inbee Park (Win)	(South Korea) So Yeon Ryu (T3)	(Spain) Beatriz Recari (T3)
Mar 3	HSBC Women's Champions	(United States) Stacy Lewis (Win)	(South Korea) Na Yeon Choi (2nd)	(United States) Paula Creamer (3rd)
Mar 17	RR Donnelley LPGA Founders Cup	(Japan) Ai Miyazato (2nd)	(United States) Angela Stanford (3rd)	(United States) Jessica Korda (T4)
Mar 24	Kia Classic	(South Korea) I.K. Kim (2nd)	(Thailand) Pornanong Phatlum (T3)	(United States) Mo Martin (T3)
Apr 7	Kraft Nabisco Championship	(Sweden) Caroline Hedwall (T3)	(Norway) Suzann Pettersen (T3)	(South Korea) Haeji Kang (T5)
Apr 20	LPGA Lotte Championship	(United States) Lizette Salas (2nd)	(China) Shanshan Feng (T9)	(South Korea) Hee-Kyung Seo (T9)
Apr 28	North Texas LPGA Shootout	(Spain) Carlota Ciganda (2nd)	(South Korea) Hee-Young Park (T4)	(France) Karine Icher (T7)
May 5	Kingsmill Championship	(United States) Cristie Kerr (Win)	(South Korea) Ilhee Lee (T3)	(United States) Gerina Piller (T9)
May 19	Mobile Bay LPGA Classic	(United States) Jennifer Johnson (Win)	(Australia) Karrie Webb (T4)	(Sweden) Anna Nordqvist (T4)
May 26	Pure Silk-Bahamas LPGA Classic	(United States) Irene Cho (2nd)	(Japan) Mika Miyazato (T4)	(United States) Mindy Kim (T4)
Jun 2	ShopRite LPGA Classic	(South Korea) Jenny Shin (4th)	(South Korea) Jeong Jang (T5)	(Japan) Chie Arimura (T5)
Jun 9	Wegmans LPGA Championship	(Scotland) Catriona Matthew (2nd)	(United States) Morgan Pressel (T3)	(South Korea) Amy Yang (T5)
Jun 23	Walmart NW Arkansas Championship	(United States) Brittany Lang (T13)	(United States) Juli Inkster (T13)	(United States) Brooke Pancake (T13)
Jun 30	U.S. Women's Open	(England) Jodi Ewart Shadoff (T4)	(United States) Brittany Lincicome (T9)	(United States) Lexi Thompson (T13)
Jul 14	Manulife Financial LPGA Classic	(South Korea) Meena Lee (4th)	(United States) Austin Ernst (T6)	(South Korea) Hanna Kang (13th)
Jul 21	Marathon Classic	(United States) Jacqui Concolino (T5)	(South Korea) Se Ri Pak (T12)	(South Korea) Chella Choi (T16)
Aug 4	Ricoh Women's British Open	(United States) Natalie Gulbis (T9)	(United States) Nicole Castrale (T9)	(Sweden) Pernilla Lindberg (T11)
Aug 25	CN Canadian Women's Open	(New Zealand) Lydia Ko (Win)	(United States) Stacy Prammanasudh (T5)	(Germany) Caroline Masson (T7)
Sep 1	Safeway Classic	(Germany) Sandra Gal (T6)	(United States) Sandra Changkija (T9)	(Netherlands) Dewi Claire Schreefel (T9)
Sep 15	The Evian Championship	(Canada) Rebecca Lee-Bentham (T11)	(United States) Cindy LaCrosse (T15)	(Australia) Katherine Hull-Kirk (T15)
Oct 6	Reignwood LPGA Classic	(Netherlands) Christel Boeljon (T7)	(South Korea) Sun Young Yoo (T10)	(Colombia) Paola Moreno (T21)
Oct 13	Sime Darby LPGA Malaysia	(United States) Alison Walshe (T6)	(United States) Michelle Wie (T12)	(United States) Jane Park (T26)
Oct 20	LPGA KEB-HanaBank Championship	(South Korea) Eun-Hee Ji (T12)	(Japan) Ayako Uehara (T41)	(United States) Candie Kung (T44)
Oct 27	Sunrise LPGA Taiwan Championship	(Spain) Azahara Muñoz (2nd)	(United States) Mina Harigae (T5)	(South Korea) M. J. Hur (T8)
Nov 10	Mizuno Classic	(Taiwan) Teresa Lu (Win)	(Japan) Haru Nomura (T13)	(South Korea) Hee-Won Han (T17)
Nov 17	Lorena Ochoa Invitational	None qualified		

Note: The following qualifiers did not play in the event: Christel Boeljon, Nicole Castrale, Mina Harigae, Haeji Kang, Teresa Lu, Haru Nomura, Se Ri Pak, Jiyai Shin, Yani Tseng.

== Final leaderboard ==
Sunday, November 24, 2013

Place	Player	Score	To par	Money ($)
1	(China) Shanshan Feng	66-74-67-66=273	−15	700,000
2	(United States) Gerina Piller	71-67-67-69=274	−14	139,713
3	(Thailand) Pornanong Phatlum	70-68-67-70=275	−13	101,352
4	(Germany) Sandra Gal	64-69-74-69=276	−12	78,404
5	(South Korea) Inbee Park	68-72-69-68=277	−11	63,106
T6	(United States) Cristie Kerr	69-69-71-69=278	−10	44,238
T6	(United States) Stacy Lewis	71-73-63-71=278	−10	44,238
T6	(South Korea) Sun Young Yoo	68-68-73-69=278	−10	44,238
T9	(United States) Jennifer Johnson	71-69-70-69=279	−9	32,509
T9	(South Korea) So Yeon Ryu	70-71-69-69=279	−9	32,509
