= 2014 CME Group Tour Championship =

Tournament information
- Dates: November 20–23, 2014
- Location: Naples, Florida; 26.248°N 81.765°W
- Courses: Tiburón Golf Club, Gold Course
- Tour: LPGA Tour

Statistics
- Par: 72
- Length: 6,540 yards (5,980 m)
- Field: 69 players
- Cut: none
- Prize fund: $2.0 million
- Winner's share: $500,000

Champion
- (New Zealand) Lydia Ko
- 278 (−10), playoff
- Location in the United States Location in Florida

The 2014 CME Group Tour Championship was the fourth CME Group Tour Championship, a women's professional golf tournament and the season-ending event on the U.S.-based LPGA Tour. It was played at the Gold Course of Tiburón Golf Club in Naples, Florida. Lydia Ko won a three-way sudden-death playoff on the fourth hole over co-runner-up Carlota Ciganda; Julieta Granada had been eliminated on the second extra hole.

The CME Group Tour Championship also marked the end of the season-long "Race to the CME Globe" in 2014. Each player's season-long "Race to the CME Globe" points were "reset" before the tournament based on their position in the points list. "Championship points" were then awarded to the top 40 players in the CME Group Tour Championship which were added to their "reset points" to determine the overall winner of the "Race to the CME Globe". Third in the standings entering the tournament, Ko won the "Race to the CME Globe" and received a $1 million bonus. Stacy Lewis, the pre-tournament leader, finished second in the race with Michelle Wie third.

== Format ==
=== Qualification ===
Called the "CME Group Titleholders" for its first three editions, qualification for the tournament changed for 2014. Previously, the top three finishers in each tournament, not previously qualified, earned entry to the tournament. For 2014 the field was determined by a season-long points race, the "Race to the CME Globe". All players making the cut in a tournament earned points, with 500 points going to the winner. The five major championships had a higher points distribution, with 625 points to the winner. No-cut tournaments only awarded points to the top 40 finishers (top 20 for the Lorena Ochoa Invitational).

Only LPGA members were eligible to earn points. The top 72 players on the "Race to the CME Globe" points list gained entry into the CME Group Titleholders Championship as well as any tournament winners, whether or not an LPGA member, not in the top 72.

=== Field ===
1. Top 72 LPGA members and those tied for 72nd on the "Race to the CME Globe" Points Standings
Marina Alex (T68), Dori Carter (70), Chella Choi (8), Na Yeon Choi (16), Carlota Ciganda (T64), Paula Creamer (17), Laura Diaz (72), Austin Ernst (37), Jodi Ewart Shadoff (48), Shanshan Feng (6), Sandra Gal (39), Julieta Granada (24), Caroline Hedwall (56), Mi Jung Hur (34), Karine Icher (26), Eun-Hee Ji (35), Tiffany Joh (T61), Jennifer Johnson (49), Moriya Jutanugarn (T61), Danielle Kang (55), Haeji Kang (54), Kim Kaufman (T64), Cristie Kerr (14), Christina Kim (23), In-Kyung Kim (52), Katherine Kirk (57), Lydia Ko (3), Jessica Korda (15), Candie Kung (71), Brittany Lang (28), Ilhee Lee (29), Meena Lee (27), Mi Hyang Lee (25), Mirim Lee (11), Amelia Lewis (66), Stacy Lewis (1), Brittany Lincicome (18), Pernilla Lindberg (41), Mo Martin (36), Caroline Masson (31), Catriona Matthew (38), Sydnee Michaels (67), Belen Mozo (59), Azahara Muñoz (10), Haru Nomura (42), Anna Nordqvist (7), Lee-Anne Pace (T43), Hee Young Park (40), Inbee Park (2), Suzann Pettersen (12), Pornanong Phatlum (22), Gerina Piller (33), Morgan Pressel (30), Beatriz Recari (50), So Yeon Ryu (5), Lizette Salas (20), Dewi Claire Schreefel (T68), Jenny Shin (21), Sarah Jane Smith (63), Angela Stanford (19), Thidapa Suwannapura (53), Lexi Thompson (13), Yani Tseng (46), Ayako Uehara (58), Mariajo Uribe (T43), Karrie Webb (9), Michelle Wie (4), Sun Young Yoo (51)

- Eligible but did not compete: Mina Harigae (45), Se-ri Pak (60), Line Vedel (47), Amy Yang (32)

2. LPGA Members, not otherwise qualified, who won at least one official LPGA tournament during the season
None

3. Non-members who won at least one official LPGA tournament during the season
Baek Kyu-jung (winner of the 2014 LPGA KEB-HanaBank Championship)

== Final leaderboard ==
Sunday, November 23, 2014

Place	Player	Score	To par	Money ($)
T1	(Spain) Carlota Ciganda	70-67-71-70=278	−10	Playoff
T1	(Paraguay) Julieta Granada	66-71-70-71=278	−10	Playoff
T1	(New Zealand) Lydia Ko	71-71-68-68=278	−10	Playoff
4	(United States) Morgan Pressel	72-66-70-72=280	−8	92,200
T5	(Germany) Sandra Gal	68-71-70-72=281	−7	67,464
T5	(United States) Michelle Wie	72-67-72-70=281	−7	67,464
T7	(South Korea) Hee Young Park	70-73-71-69=283	−5	47,675
T7	(South Korea) So Yeon Ryu	70-70-70-73=283	−5	47,675
T9	(South Korea) In-Kyung Kim	71-72-71-70=284	−4	36,730
T9	(United States) Brittany Lang	74-68-70-72=284	−4	36,730
T9	(United States) Stacy Lewis	69-74-70-71=284	−4	36,730

=== Playoff ===
Place	Player	Score	To par	Money ($)
1	(New Zealand) Lydia Ko	4-4-4-4	E	500,000
T2	(Spain) Carlota Ciganda	4-4-4-5	+1	141,743
T2	(Paraguay) Julieta Granada	4-5	+1	141,743

== Race to the CME Globe ==
=== Reset points ===
Each player's "Race to the CME Globe" points were "reset" before the tournament based on their position in the "Race to the CME Globe" points list. The leader was given 5,000 points, the player in second place 4,500 down to 10 points for the player in 72nd place.

Points	Player	Race Points	Reset points	Events
1	(United States) Stacy Lewis	4,823	5,000	27
2	(South Korea) Inbee Park	4,102	4,500	22
3	(New Zealand) Lydia Ko	3,393	4,000	25
4	(United States) Michelle Wie	2,995	3,600	20
5	(South Korea) Ryu So-yeon	2,661	3,200	24
6	(China) Shanshan Feng	2,653	2,800	23
7	(Sweden) Anna Nordqvist	2,511	2,400	25
8	(South Korea) Chella Choi	2,299	2,000	30
9	(Australia) Karrie Webb	2,281	1,600	18
10	(Spain) Azahara Muñoz	2,244	1,200	26

=== Final points ===
"Championship points" were awarded to the top 40 players in the CME Group Tour Championship which were added to their "reset points" to determine the overall winner. The winner of the CME Group Tour Championship received 3,500 points, the second place player 2,400, down to 210 points for the player finishing in 40th place. The effect of the points system is that the top three players in the reset points list prior to the Championship were guaranteed to win the "Race to the CME Globe" by winning the Championship. The top nine in the reset points list had a chance of winning the Race, depending on the performances of other players.

In addition to winning the CME Group Tour Championship, Ko also won the "Race to the CME Globe" and received a $1 million bonus. Ko was guaranteed to win the race even before the playoff since the 2,400 points she would have earned for losing in the playoff would have given her a total of 5,900 points, ahead of Stacy Lewis on 5,650. The bonus did not count on the official money list. Second place earned $150,000 and third place $100,000.

Place	Player	Reset points	Championship points	Final points
1	(New Zealand) Lydia Ko	4,000	3,500	7,500
2	(United States) Stacy Lewis	5,000	650	5,650
3	(United States) Michelle Wie	3,600	1,500	5,100
4	(South Korea) Inbee Park	4,500	370	4,870
5	(South Korea) Ryu So-yeon	3,200	1,000	4,200
6	(China) Shanshan Feng	2,800	490	3,290
7	(Paraguay) Julieta Granada	540	2,400	2,940
8	(Spain) Carlota Ciganda	50	2,400	2,450
9	(South Korea) Chella Choi	2,000	410	2,410
10	(Sweden) Anna Nordqvist	2,400	0	2,400
