= 2018 CME Group Tour Championship =

Tournament information
- Dates: November 15–18, 2018
- Location: Naples, Florida; 26.248°N 81.765°W
- Courses: Tiburón Golf Club, Gold Course
- Tour: LPGA Tour

Statistics
- Par: 72
- Length: 6,556 yards (5,995 m)
- Field: 72 players
- Cut: none
- Prize fund: $2.5 million
- Winner's share: $500,000

Champion
- (United States) Lexi Thompson
- 270 (−18)
- Location in the United States Location in Florida

The 2018 CME Group Tour Championship was the eighth CME Group Tour Championship, a women's professional golf tournament and the season-ending event on the U.S.-based LPGA Tour. It was played at the Gold Course of Tiburón Golf Club in Naples, Florida.

The CME Group Tour Championship also marked the end of the season-long "Race to the CME Globe" in 2018. Each player's season-long "Race to the CME Globe" points were "reset" before the tournament based on their position in the points list. "Championship points" were awarded to the top 40 players in the CME Group Tour Championship which were added to their "reset points" to determine the overall winner of the "Race to the CME Globe". The event was televised by Golf Channel Thursday through Saturday on a 2-hour delay, and ABC Sunday live.

Lexi Thompson won the tournament by four strokes over Nelly Korda, while Ariya Jutanugarn won the Race to the CME Globe and took the $1,000,000 bonus.

== Format ==
=== Qualification ===
Called the "CME Group Titleholders" for its first three editions, qualification for the tournament changed for 2014. Previously, the top three finishers in each tournament, not previously qualified, earned entry to the tournament. For 2014 the field was determined by a season-long points race, the "Race to the CME Globe". All players making the cut in a tournament earned points, with 500 points going to the winner. The five major championships had a higher points distribution, with 625 points to the winner. No-cut tournaments only awarded points to the top 40 finishers.

Only LPGA members were eligible to earn points. The top 72 players on the "Race to the CME Globe" points list gained entry into the CME Group Titleholders Championship as well as any tournament winners, whether or not an LPGA member, not in the top 72.

=== Field ===
1. Top 72 LPGA members and those tied for 72nd on the "Race to the CME Globe" Points Standings

Marina Alex, Brittany Altomare, Aditi Ashok, Céline Boutier, Chella Choi, Chun In-gee, Carlota Ciganda, Jacqui Concolino, Lindy Duncan, Austin Ernst, Jodi Ewart Shadoff, Hannah Green, Jaye Marie Green, Georgia Hall, Nasa Hataoka, Brooke Henderson, Wei-Ling Hsu, Charley Hull, Ji Eun-hee, Ariya Jutanugarn, Moriya Jutanugarn, Danielle Kang, Haeji Kang, Cristie Kerr, Megan Khang, Kim Sei-young, Katherine Kirk, Ko Jin-young, Lydia Ko, Jessica Korda, Nelly Korda, Bronte Law, Minjee Lee, Lee Jeong-eun, Lee Mi-hyang, Mirim Lee, Brittany Lincicome, Pernilla Lindberg, Yu Liu, Gaby López, Mo Martin, Caroline Masson, Ally McDonald, Azahara Muñoz, Anna Nordqvist, Su-Hyun Oh, Amy Olson, Ryann O'Toole, Annie Park, Jane Park, Park Sung-hyun, Pornanong Phatlum, Ryu So-yeon, Lizette Salas, Jenny Shin, Sarah Jane Smith, Mariah Stackhouse, Thidapa Suwannapura, Emma Talley, Lexi Thompson, Ayako Uehara, Angel Yin

Qualified but did not play: Shanshan Feng, Sandra Gal, Caroline Inglis, Kim Hyo-joo, In-Kyung Kim, Inbee Park, Jennifer Song, Angela Stanford, Michelle Wie, Amy Yang

2. LPGA Members, not otherwise qualified, who won at least one official LPGA tournament during the season

None

3. Non-members who won at least one official LPGA tournament during the season

None

4. Those beyond 72nd on the "Race to the CME Globe" Points Standings to fill the field to 72 players

Ashleigh Buhai, Pei-Yun Chien, Daniela Holmqvist, Tiffany Joh, Wichanee Meechai, Park Hee-young, Pannarat Thanapolboonyaras, Maria Torres, Mariajo Uribe, Sakura Yokomine

Qualified but did not play: Mina Harigae

== Race to the CME Globe ==
=== Reset points ===
Each player's "Race to the CME Globe" points were "reset" before the tournament based on their position in the "Race to the CME Globe" points list. The leader was given 5,000 points, the player in second place 4,500 down to 10 points for the player in 72nd place.

Points	Player	Race Points	Reset points	Events
1	(Thailand) Ariya Jutanugarn	4,354	5,000	27
2	(Australia) Minjee Lee	3,141	4,750	26
3	(Canada) Brooke Henderson	2,649	4,500	27
4	(Japan) Nasa Hataoka	2,596	4,250	23
5	(South Korea) Park Sung-hyun	2,478	4,000	23
6	(South Korea) Kim Sei-young	2,474	3,600	26
7	(South Korea) Ko Jin-young	2,388	3,200	24
8	(South Korea) Ryu So-yeon	2,231	2,800	22
9	(Thailand) Moriya Jutanugarn	2,189	2,400	27
10	(New Zealand) Lydia Ko	2,188	2,100	25

=== Final points ===
"Championship points" were awarded to the top 40 players in the CME Group Tour Championship which were added to their "reset points" to determine the overall winner. The winner of the CME Group Tour Championship receiver 3,500 points, the second place player 2,450, down to 150 points for the player finishing in 40th place. The effect of the points system is that the top five players in the reset points list prior to the Championship would be guaranteed to win the "Race to the CME Globe" by winning the Championship. The top 12 in the reset points list would have a chance of winning the Race depending on the performances of other players.

Place	Player	Reset points	Championship points	Final points
1	(Thailand) Ariya Jutanugarn	5,000	1,750	6,750
2	(Canada) Brooke Henderson	4,500	700	5,200
3	(Japan) Nasa Hataoka	4,250	850	5,100
4	(South Korea) Ryu So-yeon	2,800	2,250	5,050
5	(Australia) Minjee Lee	4,750	180	4,930
6	(South Korea) Park Sung-hyun	4,000	400	4,400
7	(South Korea) Kim Sei-young	3,600	700	4,300
8	(United States) Lexi Thompson	520	3,500	4,020
9	(New Zealand) Lydia Ko	2,100	1,750	3,850
10	(United States) Marina Alex	1,800	1,750	3,550

=== Bonus ===
The winner of the "Race to the CME Globe" receives a $1 million bonus that does not count toward official money list, while second place and third place receive $150,000 and $100,000, respectively.

== Final leaderboard ==
Sunday, November 18, 2018

Place	Player	Score	To par	Money ($)
1	(United States) Lexi Thompson	65-67-68-70=270	−18	500,000
2	(United States) Nelly Korda	69-67-67-71=274	−14	216,800
T3	(United States) Brittany Lincicome	64-71-73-67=275	−13	139,468
T3	(South Korea) Ryu So-yeon	69-69-69-68=275	−13	139,468
T5	(United States) Marina Alex	69-67-71-69=276	−12	75,966
T5	(Spain) Carlota Ciganda	66-71-69-70=276	−12	75,966
T5	(Thailand) Ariya Jutanugarn	70-71-69-66=276	−12	75,966
T5	(New Zealand) Lydia Ko	69-71-68-68=276	−12	75,966
9	(Japan) Nasa Hataoka	64-76-70-68=278	−10	52,821
T10	(Canada) Brooke Henderson	73-69-69-68=279	−9	44,708
T10	(South Korea) Kim Sei-young	69-72-68-70=279	−9	44,708
T10	(United States) Amy Olson	63-72-76-68=279	−9	44,708
