= 2015 CME Group Tour Championship =

Golf tournament

Tournament information
- Dates: November 19–22, 2015
- Location: Naples, Florida; 26.248°N 81.765°W
- Courses: Tiburón Golf Club, Gold Course
- Tour: LPGA Tour

Statistics
- Par: 72
- Length: 6,540 yards (5,980 m)
- Field: 71 players
- Cut: none
- Prize fund: $2.0 million
- Winner's share: $500,000

Champion
- (United States) Cristie Kerr
- 271 (−17)
- Location in the United States Location in Florida

The 2015 CME Group Tour Championship was the fifth CME Group Tour Championship, a women's professional golf tournament and the season-ending event on the U.S.-based LPGA Tour. It was played at the Gold Course of Tiburón Golf Club in Naples, Florida.

The CME Group Tour Championship also marked the end of the season-long "Race to the CME Globe" in 2015. Each player's season-long "Race to the CME Globe" points were "reset" before the tournament based on their position in the points list. "Championship points" were awarded to the top 40 players in the CME Group Tour Championship which were added to their "reset points" to determine the overall winner of the "Race to the CME Globe". The event was televised by Golf Channel Thursday through Saturday on a 2-hour delay, and by ABC live on Sunday.

Cristie Kerr won the tournament.

== Format ==
=== Qualification ===
Called the "CME Group Titleholders" for its first three editions, qualification for the tournament changed for 2014. Previously, the top three finishers in each tournament, not previously qualified, earned entry to the tournament. For 2014 the field was determined by a season-long points race, the "Race to the CME Globe". All players making the cut in a tournament earned points, with 500 points going to the winner. The five major championships had a higher points distribution, with 625 points to the winner. Tournaments without a cut awarded points to the top 40 finishers, except for the Lorena Ochoa Invitational, where only the top 20 are awarded points.

Only LPGA members are eligible to earn points. The top 72 players on the "Race to the CME Globe" points list gain entry into the CME Group Tour Championship, as well as any tournament winners, whether or not an LPGA member, not in the top 72.

=== Field ===
1. Top 72 LPGA members and those tied for 72nd on the "Race to the CME Globe" Points Standings

Baek Kyu-jung (60), Chella Choi (20), Na Yeon Choi (15), Carlota Ciganda (37), Paula Creamer (52), Austin Ernst (27), Shanshan Feng (9), Sandra Gal (33), Julieta Granada (46), Jaye Marie Green (53), Wei-Ling Hsu (50), Charley Hull (58), Karine Icher (39), Jang Ha-na (11), Ji Eun-hee (38), Ariya Jutanugarn (36), Moriya Jutanugarn (64), Danielle Kang (54), Kim Kaufman (41), Cristie Kerr (12), Christina Kim (57), Kim Hyo-joo (10), In-Kyung Kim (66), Kim Sei-young (4), Lydia Ko (1), Jessica Korda (23), Candie Kung (25), Brittany Lang (29), Alison Lee (31), Ilhee Lee (22), Lee Mi-hyang (24), Min Lee (72), Minjee Lee (13), Mirim Lee (18), Stacy Lewis (3), Xi Yu Lin (42), Brittany Lincicome (16), Pernilla Lindberg (45), Mo Martin (47), Caroline Masson (49), Catriona Matthew (61), Sydnee Michaels (65), Ai Miyazato (70), Mika Miyazato (27), Azahara Muñoz (34), Haru Nomura (55), Anna Nordqvist (8), Ryann O'Toole (69), Park Hee-young (48), Inbee Park (2), Jane Park (63), Suzann Pettersen (14), Pornanong Phatlum (32), Gerina Piller (26), Morgan Pressel (17), Beatriz Recari (71), Ryu So-yeon (6), Lizette Salas (35), Alena Sharp (62), Jenny Shin (21), Jennifer Song (68), Angela Stanford (30), Kris Tamulis (44), Lexi Thompson (5), Yani Tseng (19), Mariajo Uribe (51), Karrie Webb (56), Michelle Wie (67), Amy Yang (7), Yoo Sun-young (43)

Lee-Anne Pace (59) and Sakura Yokomine (40) did not play

2. LPGA Members, not otherwise qualified, who won at least one official LPGA tournament during the season

Brooke Henderson

3. Non-members who won at least one official LPGA tournament during the season

Ahn Sun-ju, Chun In-gee – both eligible but did not enter.

== Race to the CME Globe ==
=== Reset points ===
Each player's "Race to the CME Globe" points are "reset" before the tournament based on their position in the "Race to the CME Globe" points list. The leader is given 5,000 points, the player in second place 4,500 down to 10 points for the player in 72nd place.

Points	Player	Race Points	Reset points	Events
1	(New Zealand) Lydia Ko	4,913	5,000	23
2	(South Korea) Inbee Park	4,444	4,500	24
3	(United States) Stacy Lewis	3,510	4,000	25
4	(South Korea) Kim Sei-young	3,357	3,600	26
5	(United States) Lexi Thompson	2,827	3,200	23
6	(South Korea) Ryu So-yeon	2,441	2,800	24
7	(South Korea) Amy Yang	2,335	2,400	22
8	(Sweden) Anna Nordqvist	2,073	2,000	24
9	(China) Shanshan Feng	1,994	1,600	20
10	(South Korea) Kim Hyo-joo	1,974	1,200	23

=== Final points ===
"Championship points" are awarded to the top 40 players in the CME Group Tour Championship which are added to their "reset points" to determine the overall winner. The winner of the CME Group Tour Championship receives 3,500 points, the second place player 2,400 down to 210 points for the player finishing in 40th place. The effect of the points system is that the top three players in the reset points list prior to the Championship will be guaranteed to win the "Race to the CME Globe" by winning the Championship. The top nine in the reset points list will have a chance of winning the Race depending on the performances of other players.

Place	Player	Reset points	Championship points	Final points
1	(New Zealand) Lydia Ko	5,000	1,000	6,000
2	(South Korea) Inbee Park	4,500	1,200	5,700
3	(United States) Lexi Thompson	3,200	1,800	5,000
4	(United States) Stacy Lewis	4,000	470	4,470
5	(United States) Cristie Kerr	920	3,500	4,420
6	(South Korea) Kim Sei-young	3,600	370	3,970
7	(South Korea) Amy Yang	2,400	1,000	3,400
8	(South Korea) Jang Ha-na	960	2,400	3,360
9	(United States) Gerina Piller	500	2,400	2,900
10	(South Korea) Ryu So-yeon	2,800	0	2,800

== Final leaderboard ==
Sunday, November 22, 2015

Place	Player	Score	To par	Money ($)
1	(United States) Cristie Kerr	68-69-66-68=271	−17	500,000
T2	(South Korea) Jang Ha-na	69-65-69-69=272	−16	139,869
T2	(United States) Gerina Piller	68-70-67-67=272	−16	139,869
4	(United States) Lexi Thompson	70-69-67-68=274	−14	90,982
5	(France) Karine Icher	71-67-68-69=275	−13	73,230
6	(South Korea) Inbee Park	71-69-67-69=276	−12	59,915
T7	(New Zealand) Lydia Ko	69-67-69-72=277	−11	42,385
T7	(South Korea) Minjee Lee	75-66-67-69=277	−11	42,385
T7	(United States) Sydnee Michaels	72-71-69-65=277	−11	42,385
T7	(South Korea) Amy Yang	72-69-67-69=277	−11	42,385
