= 2012 CME Group Titleholders =

Tournament information
- Dates: November 15–18, 2012
- Location: Naples, Florida; 26.288°N 81.631°W
- Courses: TwinEagles Club, Eagle Course
- Tour: LPGA Tour

Statistics
- Par: 72
- Length: 6,699 yards (6,126 m)
- Field: 73 players
- Cut: none
- Prize fund: $1.5 million
- Winner's share: $500,000

Champion
- (South Korea) Na Yeon Choi
- 274 (−14)

Location map
- Location in the United States Location in Florida

The 2012 CME Group Titleholders was the second CME Group Titleholders, a women's professional golf tournament and the season-ending event on the U.S.-based LPGA Tour. It was played November 15–18, 2012 at the TwinEagles Club in Naples, Florida.

The top three finishers who were LPGA members from each official LPGA tournament, not otherwise qualified, earned a spot in the Titleholders. If tied, the player with the lower final round score qualified.

South Korean Na Yeon Choi won by two strokes over So Yeon Ryu.

== Qualifiers ==
The following table shows the three qualifiers for the Titleholders from each tournament.

Dates	Tournament	1st Qualifier	2nd Qualifier	3rd Qualifier
Feb 12	ISPS Handa Women's Australian Open	(United States) Jessica Korda (Win)	(United States) Stacy Lewis (T2)	(United States) Brittany Lincicome (T2)
Feb 19	Honda LPGA Thailand	(Taiwan) Yani Tseng (Win)	(Japan) Ai Miyazato (2nd)	(South Korea) Jiyai Shin (3rd)
Feb 26	HSBC Women's Champions	(United States) Angela Stanford (Win)	(South Korea) Na Yeon Choi (T2)	(China) Shanshan Feng (T2)
Mar 18	RR Donnelley LPGA Founders Cup	(South Korea) So Yeon Ryu (4th)	(South Korea) Hee Young Park (5th)	(Sweden) Caroline Hedwall (T6)
Mar 25	Kia Classic	(South Korea) Sun-Young Yoo (2nd)	(South Korea) Se Ri Pak (T7)	(England) Jodi Ewart (T7)
Apr 1	Kraft Nabisco Championship	(South Korea) I.K. Kim (2nd)	(South Korea) Amy Yang (T4)	(South Korea) Hee Kyung Seo (T4)
Apr 21	LPGA Lotte Championship	(South Korea) Meena Lee (T2)	(Spain) Azahara Muñoz (T2)	(United States) Cristie Kerr (T4)
Apr 29	Mobile Bay LPGA Classic	(United States) Lexi Thompson (2nd)	(France) Karine Icher (3rd)	(Australia) Karrie Webb (T4)
May 20	Sybase Match Play Championship	(United States) Candie Kung (2nd)	(United States) Morgan Pressel (3rd)	(United States) Vicky Hurst (4th)
Jun 3	ShopRite LPGA Classic	(Australia) Katherine Hull (2nd)	(Japan) Mika Miyazato (T3)	(South Korea) Hee-Won Han (T5)
Jun 10	Wegmans LPGA Championship	(Norway) Suzann Pettersen (T2)	(South Korea) Eun-Hee Ji (T2)	(United States) Gerina Piller (T6)
Jun 24	Manulife Financial LPGA Classic	(United States) Brittany Lang (Win)	(South Korea) Chella Choi (T2)	(South Korea) Inbee Park (T2)
Jul 1	Walmart NW Arkansas Championship	(Venezuela) Veronica Felibert (T4)	(Sweden) Anna Nordqvist (T8)	(South Korea) Jenny Shin (T10)
Jul 8	U.S. Women's Open	(Germany) Sandra Gal (3rd)	(South Korea) Ilhee Lee (T4)	(Italy) Giulia Sergas (T4)
Jul 29	Evian Masters	(United States) Natalie Gulbis (T4)	(Spain) Beatriz Recari (T9)	(United States) Paula Creamer (T9)
Aug 12	Jamie Farr Toledo Classic	(United States) Jennie Lee (T5)	(United States) Jacqui Concolino (T11)	(Australia) Lindsey Wright (T15)
Aug 19	Safeway Classic	(South Korea) Haeji Kang (T4)	(United States) Sydnee Michaels (7th)	(United States) Michelle Wie (8th)
Aug 26	CN Canadian Women's Open	(New Zealand) Lydia Ko (a) (Win)	(United States) Jane Rah (T9)	(Scotland) Catriona Matthew (T11)
Sep 9	Kingsmill Championship	(United States) Danielle Kang (T3)	(Sweden) Maria Hjorth (T9)	(Netherlands) Dewi Claire Schreefel (13th)
Sep 16	Ricoh Women's British Open	(Paraguay) Julieta Granada (7th)	(United States) Katie Futcher (T8)	(United States) Cindy LaCrosse (T13)
Sep 23	Navistar LPGA Classic	(South Korea) M.J. Hur (T3)	(Australia) Sarah Jane Smith (T6)	(Sweden) Pernilla Lindberg (T11)
Oct 14	Sime Darby LPGA Malaysia	(United States) Lizette Salas (T9)	(Japan) Momoko Ueda (T14)	(United States) Mina Harigae (T30)
Oct 21	LPGA KEB-HanaBank Championship	(Sweden) Karin Sjodin (T13)	(United States) Jennifer Johnson (T39)	(United States) Nicole Castrale (T45)
Oct 28	Sunrise LPGA Taiwan Championship	(Spain) Belen Mozo (T11)	(Colombia) Mariajo Uribe (T20)	(United States) Mo Martin (T23)
Nov 4	Mizuno Classic	(Thailand) Pornanong Phatlum (T27)	(United States) Jennifer Song (T53)	(United States) Alison Walshe (T32)
Nov 11	Lorena Ochoa Invitational	(Mexico) Lorena Ochoa (T18)	(United States) Kristy McPherson (T26)	(Mexico) Tanya Dergal (36th)

Note: The following qualifiers did not play in the event: Katie Futcher, Lydia Ko, Lorena Ochoa, Se Ri Pak, Momoko Ueda.

== Final leaderboard ==
Place	Player	Score	To par	Money ($)
1	(South Korea) Na Yeon Choi	67-68-69-70=274	−14	500,000
2	(South Korea) So Yeon Ryu	66-72-68-70=276	−12	106,379
3	(United States) Brittany Lincicome	68-69-70-70=277	−11	77,171
4	(Australia) Karrie Webb	69-69-71-69=278	−10	59,698
5	(Japan) Ai Miyazato	70-64-71-74=279	−9	48,050
6	(France) Karine Icher	67-70-70-73=280	−8	39,313
T7	(China) Shanshan Feng	70-69-69-73=281	−7	27,811
T7	(United States) Cristie Kerr	67-74-71-69 =281	−7	27,811
T7	(Spain) Azahara Muñoz	72-72-67-70 =281	−7	27,811
T7	(Sweden) Anna Nordqvist	69-70-69-73 =281	−7	27,811
