= 2017 CME Group Tour Championship =

Tournament information
- Dates: November 16–19, 2017
- Location: Naples, Florida; 26.248°N 81.765°W
- Courses: Tiburón Golf Club, Gold Course
- Tour: LPGA Tour

Statistics
- Par: 72
- Length: 6,540 yards (5,980 m)
- Field: 74 players
- Cut: none
- Prize fund: $2.5 million
- Winner's share: $500,000

Champion
- (Thailand) Ariya Jutanugarn
- 269 (−19)
- Location in the United States Location in Florida

The 2017 CME Group Tour Championship was the seventh CME Group Tour Championship, a women's professional golf tournament and the season-ending event on the U.S.-based LPGA Tour. It was played at the Gold Course of Tiburón Golf Club in Naples, Florida.

The CME Group Tour Championship also marked the end of the season-long "Race to the CME Globe" in 2017. Each player's season-long "Race to the CME Globe" points were "reset" before the tournament based on their position in the points list. "Championship points" were awarded to the top 40 players in the CME Group Tour Championship which were added to their "reset points" to determine the overall winner of the "Race to the CME Globe". The event was televised by Golf Channel Thursday through Saturday on a 2-hour delay, and ABC Sunday live.

== Format ==
=== Qualification ===
Called the "CME Group Titleholders" for its first three editions, qualification for the tournament changed for 2014. Previously, the top three finishers in each tournament, not previously qualified, earned entry to the tournament. For 2014 the field was determined by a season-long points race, the "Race to the CME Globe". All players making the cut in a tournament earned points, with 500 points going to the winner. The five major championships had a higher points distribution, with 625 points to the winner. No-cut tournaments only awarded points to the top 40 finishers (top 20 for the Lorena Ochoa Match Play).

Only LPGA members were eligible to earn points. The top 82 players on the "Race to the CME Globe" points list gained entry into the CME Group Titleholders Championship as well as any tournament winners, whether or not an LPGA member, not in the top 82.

=== Field ===
1. Top 82 LPGA members and those tied for 82nd on the "Race to the CME Globe" Points Standings

Marina Alex, Brittany Altomare, Aditi Ashok, Nicole Broch Larsen, Pei-Yun Chien, Chun In-gee, Carlota Ciganda, Cydney Clanton, Jacqui Concolino, Lindy Duncan, Austin Ernst, Jodi Ewart Shadoff, Shanshan Feng, Sandra Gal, Jaye Marie Green, Brooke Henderson, Wei-Ling Hsu, Charley Hull, Karine Icher, Jang Ha-na, Ji Eun-hee, Tiffany Joh, Ariya Jutanugarn, Moriya Jutanugarn, Danielle Kang, Kim Kaufman, Cristie Kerr, Megan Khang, In-Kyung Kim, Kim Sei-young, Katherine Kirk, Lydia Ko, Jessica Korda, Nelly Korda, Olafia Kristinsdottir, Candie Kung, Brittany Lang, Lee Jeong-eun, Lee Mi-hyang, Minjee Lee, Mirim Lee, Stacy Lewis, Brittany Lincicome, Pernilla Lindberg, Gaby López, Mo Martin, Caroline Masson, Ally McDonald, Azahara Muñoz, Anna Nordqvist, Ryann O'Toole, Jane Park, Park Sung-hyun, Suzann Pettersen, Pornanong Phatlum, Gerina Piller, Morgan Pressel, Beatriz Recari, Ryu So-yeon, Madelene Sagström, Lizette Salas, Alena Sharp, Jenny Shin, Sarah Jane Smith, Jennifer Song, Angela Stanford, Lexi Thompson, Ayako Uehara, Michelle Wie, Jing Yan, Amy Yang, Angel Yin, Yoo Sun-young

Qualified but did not play: Ashleigh Buhai, Chella Choi, Laura Gonzalez Escallon, M. J. Hur, Kim Hyo-joo, Haru Nomura, Su-Hyun Oh, Inbee Park, Karrie Webb

2. LPGA Members, not otherwise qualified, who won at least one official LPGA tournament during the season

None

3. Non-members who won at least one official LPGA tournament during the season

Ko Jin-young

== Race to the CME Globe ==
=== Reset points ===
Each player's "Race to the CME Globe" points were "reset" before the tournament based on their position in the "Race to the CME Globe" points list. The leader was given 5,000 points, the player in second place 4,500 down to 10 points for the player in 72nd place.

Points	Player	Race Points	Reset points	Events
1	(United States) Lexi Thompson	3,304	5,000	21
2	(South Korea) Park Sung-hyun	3,219	4,750	23
3	(China) Shanshan Feng	3,147	4,500	22
4	(South Korea) Ryu So-yeon	3,064	4,250	23
5	(Canada) Brooke Henderson	2,785	4,000	30
6	(South Korea) Chun In-gee	2,611	3,600	23
7	(United States) Cristie Kerr	2,583	3,200	23
8	(Thailand) Moriya Jutanugarn	2,513	2,800	28
9	(Thailand) Ariya Jutanugarn	2,376	2,400	27
10	(Sweden) Anna Nordqvist	2,214	2,100	20

=== Final points ===
"Championship points" were awarded to the top 40 players in the CME Group Tour Championship which were added to their "reset points" to determine the overall winner. The winner of the CME Group Tour Championship receiver 3,500 points, the second place player 2,450, down to 150 points for the player finishing in 40th place. The effect of the points system is that the top five players in the reset points list prior to the Championship would be guaranteed to win the "Race to the CME Globe" by winning the Championship. The top 12 in the reset points list would have a chance of winning the Race depending on the performances of other players.

Place	Player	Reset points	Championship points	Final points
1	(United States) Lexi Thompson	5,000	2,450	7,450
2	(South Korea) Park Sung-hyun	4,750	1,500	6,250
3	(Thailand) Ariya Jutanugarn	2,400	3,500	5,900
4	(China) Shanshan Feng	4,500	340	4,840
5	(South Korea) Ryu So-yeon	4,250	250	4,500
6	(Canada) Brooke Henderson	4,000	300	4,300
7	(South Korea) Chun In-gee	3,600	0	3,600
8	(United States) Cristie Kerr	3,200	200	3,400
9	(Thailand) Moriya Jutanugarn	2,800	250	3,050
10	(United States) Jessica Korda	320	2,450	2,770

=== Bonus ===
The winner of the "Race to the CME Globe", Lexi Thompson, received a $1 million bonus that does not count toward official money list, while Park Sung-hyun in second place and Ariya Jutanugarn in third place received $150,000 and $100,000, respectively.

== Final leaderboard ==
Sunday, November 19, 2017

Place	Player	Score	To par	Money ($)
1	(Thailand) Ariya Jutanugarn	68-71-67-67=273	−15	500,000
T2	(United States) Jessica Korda	69-68-70-67=274	−14	186,576
T2	(United States) Lexi Thompson	71-67-69-67=274	−14	186,576
T4	(South Korea) Ji Eun-hee	69-70-69-67=275	−13	109,523
T4	(Sweden) Pernilla Lindberg	69-67-71-68=275	−13	109,523
T6	(South Korea) Park Sung-hyun	67-65-75-69=276	−12	73,411
T6	(United States) Michelle Wie	72-68-66-70=276	−12	73,411
T8	(United States) Kim Kaufman	70-72-64-71=277	−11	53,085
T8	(South Korea) In-Kyung Kim	70-67-71-69=277	−11	53,085
T8	(United States) Nelly Korda	70-66-73-68=277	−11	53,085
