= 2020 CME Group Tour Championship =

Tournament information
- Dates: December 17–20, 2020
- Location: Naples, Florida; 26.248°N 81.765°W
- Courses: Tiburón Golf Club, Gold Course
- Tour: LPGA Tour

Statistics
- Par: 72
- Length: 6,556 yards (5,995 m)
- Field: 72 players
- Cut: none
- Prize fund: $3,000,000
- Winner's share: $1,100,000

Champion
- (South Korea) Ko Jin-young
- 270 (−18)

Location map
- Location in the United States Location in Florida

The 2020 CME Group Tour Championship was the 10th CME Group Tour Championship, a women's professional golf tournament and the season-ending event on the U.S.-based LPGA Tour. It was played at the Gold Course of Tiburón Golf Club in Naples, Florida. The CME Group Tour Championship marked the end of the season-long "Race to the CME Globe" in 2020. The event was televised by Golf Channel Thursday through Saturday on a 3-hour delay, and NBC Sunday live.

Ko Jin-young won by five strokes over Hannah Green and Kim Sei-young. With the large winner's check, she also topped the season's money list despite playing in only four events.

== Format ==
=== Qualification ===
Since 2014, the field has determined by a season-long points race, the "Race to the CME Globe". All players making the cut in a tournament earned points, with 500 points going to the winner. The five major championships had a higher points distribution, with 625 points to the winner. No-cut tournaments only awarded points to the top 40 finishers. Only LPGA members are eligible to earn points. From 2014 to 2018, the top 72 players on the points list and any tournament winners, whether or not a member, earned entry into the championship. The points were reset for the championship and the points leader after the championship won a $1 million bonus. Only the top-12 players entering the tournament has a mathematical chance of winning the bonus.

After the field in 2019 was 60 players, the field expanded to 72 players in 2020 (the top 70 from the "Race to the CME Globe" points list and 2 sponsor's exemptions) and the purse dropped to $3 million. The bonus is now rolled into the purse so that the winner of the tournament wins $1.1 million. All 72 players compete for the top prize.

=== Field ===
Top 70 LPGA members and those tied for 70th on the "Race to the CME Globe" Points Standings

Brittany Altomare, Céline Boutier, Ashleigh Buhai, Chun In-gee, Carlota Ciganda, Cydney Clanton, Perrine Delacour, Austin Ernst, Jodi Ewart Shadoff, María Fassi, Kristen Gillman, Hannah Green, Georgia Hall, Mina Harigae, Nasa Hataoka, Brooke Henderson, Charley Hull, Ariya Jutanugarn, Moriya Jutanugarn, Danielle Kang, Cristie Kerr, Megan Khang, Christina Kim, Kim Sei-young, Katherine Kirk, Cheyenne Knight, Ko Jin-young, Lydia Ko, Jessica Korda, Nelly Korda, Jennifer Kupcho, Brittany Lang, Andrea Lee, Minjee Lee, Mirim Lee, Stacy Lewis, Lin Xiyu, Brittany Lincicome, Pernilla Lindberg, Yu Liu, Gaby López, Nanna Koerstz Madsen, Leona Maguire, Caroline Masson, Stephanie Meadow, Azahara Muñoz, Yealimi Noh, Anna Nordqvist, Bianca Pagdanganan, Park Hee-young, Inbee Park, Robynn Ree, Mel Reid, Ryu So-yeon, Madelene Sagström, Lizette Salas, Sarah Schmelzel, Alena Sharp, Jenny Shin, Jennifer Song, Angela Stanford, Linnea Ström, Jasmine Suwannapura, Emma Talley, Kelly Tan, Lexi Thompson, Maria Torres, Anne van Dam, Lindsey Weaver, Amy Yang

- Marina Alex, Ally Ewing, Lee Mi-hyang, Amy Olson did not play

Two sponsor's exemptions

Natalie Gulbis, Sarah Kemp

== Final leaderboard ==
Sunday, December 20, 2020

Place	Player	Score	To par	Money ($)
1	(South Korea) Ko Jin-young	68-67-69-66=270	−18	1,100,000
T2	(Australia) Hannah Green	69-68-71-67=275	−13	209,555
T2	(South Korea) Kim Sei-young	67-69-67-72=275	−13	209,555
4	(United States) Mina Harigae	70-69-69-68=276	−12	117,279
T5	(New Zealand) Lydia Ko	74-65-69-69=277	−11	82,319
T5	(United States) Lexi Thompson	65-71-71-70=277	−11	82,319
7	(United States) Austin Ernst	69-69-69-71=278	−10	52,021
7	(England) Georgia Hall	69-69-68-72=278	−10	52,021
7	(Canada) Brooke Henderson	73-68-66-71=278	−10	52,021
10	(Thailand) Ariya Jutanugarn	72-70-71-67=280	−8	37,162
10	(United States) Cristie Kerr	68-74-66-72=280	−8	37,162
10	(Sweden) Anna Nordqvist	68-72-70-70=280	−8	37,162
