= 2021 CME Group Tour Championship =

Tournament information
- Dates: November 18–21, 2021
- Location: Naples, Florida; 26.248°N 81.765°W
- Courses: Tiburón Golf Club, Gold Course
- Tour: LPGA Tour

Statistics
- Par: 72
- Length: 6,556 yards (5,995 m)
- Field: 60 players
- Cut: none
- Prize fund: $5 million
- Winner's share: $1,500,000

Champion
- (South Korea) Ko Jin-young
- Location in the United States Location in Florida

The 2021 CME Group Tour Championship was the 11th CME Group Tour Championship, a women's professional golf tournament and the season-ending event on the U.S.-based LPGA Tour. It was played at the Gold Course of Tiburón Golf Club in Naples, Florida. The CME Group Tour Championship marked the end of the season-long "Race to the CME Globe" in 2021. The event was televised by Golf Channel Thursday through Saturday on a delay, and NBC Sunday live.

== Format ==
=== Qualification ===
Since 2014, the field has determined by a season-long points race, the "Race to the CME Globe". All players making the cut in a tournament earned points, with 500 points going to the winner. The five major championships had a higher points distribution, with 625 points to the winner. No-cut tournaments only awarded points to the top 40 finishers. Only LPGA members are eligible to earn points. From 2014 to 2018, the top 72 players on the points list and any tournament winners, whether or not a member, earned entry into the championship. The points were reset for the championship and the points leader after the championship won a $1 million bonus. Only the top-12 players entering the tournament has a mathematical chance of winning the bonus.

Since 2019, the top 60 players on the "Race to the CME Globe" points list gained entry into the championship. Tournament winners are no longer given automatic entry into the championship. The bonus is now rolled into the purse so that the winner of the tournament wins $1.5 million. All 60 players compete for the top prize.

=== Field ===
Top 60 LPGA members and those tied for 60th on the "Race to the CME Globe" Points Standings

Brittany Altomare, Pajaree Anannarukarn, Céline Boutier, Matilda Castren, Chella Choi, Chun In-gee, Carlota Ciganda, Jenny Coleman, Austin Ernst, Ally Ewing, Hannah Green, Georgia Hall, Mina Harigae, Nasa Hataoka, Brooke Henderson, Esther Henseleit, Hsu Wei-ling, Charley Hull, Ji Eun-hee, Ariya Jutanugarn, Moriya Jutanugarn, Danielle Kang, Megan Khang, Kim A-lim, Kim Hyo-joo, Kim Sei-young, Ko Jin-young, Lydia Ko, Jessica Korda, Nelly Korda, Jennifer Kupcho, Lee Jeong-eun, Minjee Lee, Stacy Lewis, Lin Xiyu, Yu Liu, Gaby López, Nanna Koerstz Madsen, Leona Maguire, Caroline Masson, Wichanee Meechai, Yealimi Noh, Anna Nordqvist, Su-Hyun Oh, Amy Olson, Ryann O'Toole, Sophia Popov, Ryu So-yeon, Madelene Sagström, Lizette Salas, Yuka Saso, Jenny Shin, Lauren Stephenson, Jasmine Suwannapura, Elizabeth Szokol, Emma Talley, Patty Tavatanakit, Lexi Thompson, Amy Yang, Angel Yin

- Shanshan Feng and Inbee Park did not play.

== Final leaderboard ==
Sunday, November 21, 2021

Place	Player	Score	To par	Money ($)
1	(South Korea) Ko Jin-young	69-67-66-63=265	−23	1,500,000
2	(Japan) Nasa Hataoka	69-69-64-64=266	−22	480,000
T3	(France) Céline Boutier	65-65-72-68=270	−18	268,657
T3	(United States) Mina Harigae	65-69-69-67=270	−18	268,657
T5	(United States) Megan Khang	67-69-69-66=271	−17	145,041
T5	(United States) Nelly Korda	66-69-67-69=271	−17	145,041
T5	(Australia) Minjee Lee	66-68-71-66=271	−17	145,041
8	(United States) Lexi Thompson	67-69-68-68=272	-16	98,453
T9	(South Korea) Chun In-gee	69-69-70-65=273	−15	78,807
T9	(New Zealand) Lydia Ko	69-68-72-64=273	−15	78,807
T9	(Mexico) Gaby López	66-68-69-70=273	−15	78,807
