= 2011 CME Group Titleholders =

Tournament information
- Dates: November 17–20, 2011
- Location: Orlando, Florida; 28.406°N 81.527°W
- Courses: Grand Cypress Golf Club, North and South Courses
- Tour: LPGA Tour

Statistics
- Par: 72
- Length: 6,518 yards (5,960 m)
- Field: 59 players
- Cut: none
- Prize fund: $1.5 million
- Winner's share: $500,000

Champion
- (South Korea) Hee Young Park
- 279 (−9)

Location map
- Location in the United States Location in Florida

The 2011 CME Group Titleholders was the first CME Group Titleholders, a women's professional golf tournament and the season-ending event on the U.S.-based LPGA Tour. It was played November 17–20, 2011 at the Grand Cypress Golf Club in Orlando, Florida.

The top three finishers who were LPGA members from each official LPGA tournament, not otherwise qualified, earned a spot in the Titleholders. If tied, the player with the lower final round score qualified.

South Korean Hee Young Park won by two strokes over Sandra Gal of Germany and Paula Creamer of the United States.

== Qualifiers ==
The following table shows the three qualifiers for the Titleholders from each tournament.

Dates	Tournament	1st Qualifier	2nd Qualifier	3rd Qualifier
Feb 20	Honda LPGA Thailand	(Taiwan) Yani Tseng (Win)	(United States) Michelle Wie (2nd)	(Australia) Karrie Webb (T3)
Feb 27	HSBC Women's Champions	(South Korea) Sun Young Yoo (4th)	(United States) Morgan Pressel (5th)	(South Korea) Na Yeon Choi (6th)
Mar 20	RR Donnelley LPGA Founders Cup	(United States) Paula Creamer (T2)	(United States) Brittany Lincicome (T2)	(United States) Cristie Kerr (4th)
Mar 27	Kia Classic	(Germany) Sandra Gal (Win)	(South Korea) Jiyai Shin (2nd)	(South Korea) In-Kyung Kim (T3)
Apr 3	Kraft Nabisco Championship	(United States) Stacy Lewis (Win)	(United States) Katie Futcher (T3)	(United States) Angela Stanford (T3)
May 1	Avnet LPGA Classic	(Sweden) Maria Hjorth (Win)	(South Korea) Song-Hee Kim (2nd)	(Norway) Suzann Pettersen (T3)
May 22	Sybase Match Play Championship	(Japan) Ai Miyazato (T5)	(Sweden) Sophie Gustafson (T5)	(Paraguay) Julieta Granada (T9)
Jun 5	ShopRite LPGA Classic	(Scotland) Catriona Matthew (4th)	(Sweden) Anna Nordqvist (T5)	(United States) Brittany Lang (T8)
Jun 12	LPGA State Farm Classic	(South Korea) Se Ri Pak (T5)	(United States) Mindy Kim (T5)	(United States) Wendy Ward (7th)
Jun 26	Wegmans LPGA Championship	(South Korea) Meena Lee (T6)	(Japan) Mika Miyazato (T8)	(Spain) Azahara Muñoz (T8)
Jul 10	U.S. Women's Open	(South Korea) So Yeon Ryu (Win)	(South Korea) Hee Kyung Seo (2nd)	(South Korea) Inbee Park (T6)
Jul 24	Evian Masters	(Sweden) Caroline Hedwall (T12)	(South Korea) Amy Yang (T14)	(United States) Paige Mackenzie (T21)
Jul 31	Ricoh Women's British Open	(Netherlands) Dewi Claire Schreefel (T11)	(United States) Candie Kung (T14)	(England) Karen Stupples (T22)
Aug 21	Safeway Classic	(South Korea) Hee Young Park (3rd)	(United States) Vicky Hurst (T5)	(United States) Ryann O'Toole (T5)
Aug 28	CN Canadian Women's Open	(South Korea) Hee-Won Han (T6)	(South Korea) Jenny Shin (T6)	(United States) Jennifer Johnson (T12)
Sep 11	Walmart NW Arkansas Championship	(Taiwan) Amy Hung (T5)	(Spain) Belén Mozo (T5)	(South Korea) Mi Hyun Kim (T10)
Sep 18	Navistar LPGA Classic	(United States) Lexi Thompson (Win)	(United States) Tiffany Joh (2nd)	(Italy) Giulia Sergas (T11)
Oct 9	LPGA Hana Bank Championship	(South Korea) Jimin Kang (T3)	(South Korea) Chella Choi (T7)	(China) Shanshan Feng (T13)
Oct 16	Sime Darby LPGA Malaysia	(Netherlands) Christel Boeljon (T9)	(United States) Amanda Blumenherst (T9)	(United States) Mina Harigae (T23)
Oct 23	Sunrise LPGA Taiwan Championship	(United States) Pat Hurst (T16)	(United States) Alison Walshe (T16)	(South Korea) Grace Park (T24)
Nov 6	Mizuno Classic	(Japan) Momoko Ueda (Win)	(Thailand) Pornanong Phatlum (T14)	(United States) Christina Kim (T18)
Nov 13	Lorena Ochoa Invitational	(United States) Juli Inkster (T4)	(United States) Natalie Gulbis (T16)	(Spain) Beatriz Recari (33rd)

Note: The following qualifiers did not play in the event: Shanshan Feng, Juli Inkster, Grace Park, Inbee Park, So Yeon Ryu, Jiyai Shin, Momoko Ueda.

== Final leaderboard ==
Place	Player	Score	To par	Money ($)
1	(South Korea) Hee Young Park	71-69-69-70=279	−9	500,000
T2	(United States) Paula Creamer	69-71-71-70=281	−7	95,516
T2	(Germany) Sandra Gal	69-69-71-72=281	−7	95,516
T4	(South Korea) Na Yeon Choi	66-71-75-70=282	−6	56,070
T4	(Norway) Suzann Pettersen	73-69-68-72=282	−6	56,070
T6	(United States) Cristie Kerr	68-76-71-71=286	−2	35,057
T6	(Taiwan) Yani Tseng	70-76-66-74=286	−2	35,057
T6	(United States) Michelle Wie	71-73-72-70=286	−2	35,057
9	(Sweden) Maria Hjorth	68-78-73-68=287	−1	26,975
T10	(South Korea) I.K. Kim	72-71-71-74=288	E	23,640
T10	(South Korea) Se Ri Pak	72-74-72-70=288	E	23,640
