= 2019 CME Group Tour Championship =

Tournament information
- Dates: November 21–24, 2019
- Location: Naples, Florida; 26.248°N 81.765°W
- Courses: Tiburón Golf Club, Gold Course
- Tour: LPGA Tour

Statistics
- Par: 72
- Length: 6,556 yards (5,995 m)
- Field: 60 players
- Cut: none
- Prize fund: $5 million
- Winner's share: $1,500,000

Champion
- (South Korea) Kim Sei-young
- 270 (−18)

Location map
- Location in the United States Location in Florida

The 2019 CME Group Tour Championship was the ninth CME Group Tour Championship, a women's professional golf tournament and the season-ending event on the U.S.-based LPGA Tour. It was played at the Gold Course of Tiburón Golf Club in Naples, Florida. The CME Group Tour Championship ended the season-long "Race to the CME Globe" in 2019. The event was televised by Golf Channel Thursday through Saturday on a 3-hour delay and NBC Sunday live.

Kim Sei-young won by one stroke over Charley Hull.

== Format ==
=== Qualification ===
Since 2014, the field has been determined by a season-long points race, the "Race to the CME Globe". All players making the cut in a tournament earned points, with 500 points going to the winner. The five major championships had a higher points distribution, with 625 points to the winner. No-cut tournaments only awarded points to the top 40 finishers. Only LPGA members are eligible to earn points. From 2014 to 2018, the top 72 players on the points list and any tournament winners, whether or not they were members, earned entry into the championship. The points were reset for the championship, and the points leader won a $1 million bonus after the championship. Only the top 12 players entering the tournament have a mathematical chance of winning the bonus.

For 2019, the top 60 players on the "Race to the CME Globe" points list gained entry into the championship. Tournament winners were no longer given automatic entry into the championship. The bonus is now rolled into the purse, so the tournament winner wins $1.5 million. All 60 players compete for the top prize.

=== Field ===
Top 60 LPGA members and those tied for 60th on the "Race to the CME Globe" Points Standings

Marina Alex, Brittany Altomare, Céline Boutier, Nicole Broch Larsen, Ashleigh Buhai, Chella Choi, Carlota Ciganda, Jodi Ewart Shadoff, Shanshan Feng, Kristen Gillman, Hannah Green, Jaye Marie Green, Georgia Hall, Nasa Hataoka, Brooke Henderson, Wei-Ling Hsu, Charley Hull, M. J. Hur, Ji Eun-hee, Ariya Jutanugarn, Moriya Jutanugarn, Danielle Kang, Megan Khang, Kim Hyo-joo, Kim Sei-young, Katherine Kirk, Cheyenne Knight, Ko Jin-young, Lydia Ko, Jessica Korda, Nelly Korda, Jennifer Kupcho, Bronte Law, Lee Jeong-eun, Lee Mi-hyang, Minjee Lee, Mirim Lee, Stacy Lewis, Yu Liu, Gaby López, Nanna Koerstz Madsen, Caroline Masson, Ally McDonald, Azahara Muñoz, Anna Nordqvist, Su-Hyun Oh, Amy Olson, Annie Park, Inbee Park, Park Sung-hyun, Morgan Pressel, Ryu So-yeon, Lizette Salas, Alena Sharp, Jenny Shin, Jasmine Suwannapura, Lexi Thompson, Jing Yan, Amy Yang, Angel Yin

== Final leaderboard ==
Sunday, November 24, 2019

| Place | Player | Score | To par | Money ($) |
|---|---|---|---|---|
| 1 | (South Korea) Kim Sei-young | 65-67-68-70=270 | −18 | 1,500,000 |
| 2 | (England) Charley Hull | 72-67-66-66=271 | −17 | 480,000 |
| T3 | (United States) Danielle Kang | 69-70-68-65=272 | −16 | 269,637 |
| T3 | (United States) Nelly Korda | 67-68-66-71=272 | −16 | 269,637 |
| 5 | (Canada) Brooke Henderson | 68-67-71-67=273 | −15 | 176,570 |
| T6 | (United States) Jessica Korda | 70-67-69-69=275 | −13 | 119,683 |
| T6 | (Australia) Su-Hyun Oh | 69-67-70-69=275 | −13 | 119,683 |
| T6 | (United States) Lexi Thompson | 70-67-70-68=275 | −13 | 119,683 |
| T9 | (United States) Brittany Altomare | 69-72-69-66=276 | −12 | 82,790 |
| T9 | (South Korea) Ryu So-yeon | 67-72-68-69=276 | −12 | 82,790 |
