= 2022 CME Group Tour Championship =

Golf tournament

Tournament information
- Dates: November 17–20, 2022
- Location: Naples, Florida; 26.248°N 81.765°W
- Courses: Tiburón Golf Club, Gold Course
- Tour: LPGA Tour

Statistics
- Par: 72
- Length: 6,556 yards (5,995 m)
- Field: 60 players
- Cut: none
- Prize fund: $7 million
- Winner's share: $2,000,000

Location map
- Location in the United States Location in Florida

The 2022 CME Group Tour Championship was the 12th CME Group Tour Championship, a women's professional golf tournament and the season-ending event on the U.S.-based LPGA Tour. It was played at the Gold Course of Tiburón Golf Club in Naples, Florida. The CME Group Tour Championship marked the end of the season-long "Race to the CME Globe" in 2022. The event was televised by Golf Channel Thursday through Saturday on a delay, and NBC Sunday live.

Tiburon received little damage from Hurricane Ian, outside of 350–400 trees being uprooted, and some flooding. After crews worked to remove and replant trees and repair the turf, the Gold Course reopened four days after Ian made landfall on September 28. Work then started on cleaning up the areas outside of play.

== Format ==
=== Qualification ===
Since 2014, the field has determined by a season-long points race, the "Race to the CME Globe". All players making the cut in a tournament earned points, with 500 points going to the winner. The five major championships had a higher points distribution, with 625 points to the winner. No-cut tournaments only awarded points to the top 40 finishers. Only LPGA members are eligible to earn points. From 2014 to 2018, the top 72 players on the points list and any tournament winners, whether or not a member, earned entry into the championship. The points were reset for the championship and the points leader after the championship won a $1 million bonus. Only the top-12 players entering the tournament has a mathematical chance of winning the bonus.

Since 2019, the top 60 players on the "Race to the CME Globe" points list gained entry into the championship. Tournament winners are no longer given automatic entry into the championship. The bonus is now rolled into the purse so that the winner of the tournament wins $2.0 million. All 60 players compete for the top prize.

=== Field ===
Top 60 LPGA members and those tied for 60th on the "Race to the CME Globe" Points Standings, in alphabetical order, with ranking in parentheses:

Marina Alex (31), An Narin (35), Pajaree Anannarukarn (56), Céline Boutier (11), Ashleigh Buhai (26), Matilda Castren (54), Chella Choi (45), Choi Hye-jin (5), Chun In-gee (9), Carlota Ciganda (40), Allisen Corpuz (32), Gemma Dryburgh (42), Jodi Ewart Shadoff (22), Ally Ewing (39), Ayaka Furue (16), Hannah Green (18), Georgia Hall (29), Mina Harigae (49), Nasa Hataoka (10), Brooke Henderson (4), Charley Hull (21), Ji Eun-hee (41), Moriya Jutanugarn (55), Danielle Kang (13), Megan Khang (24), Kim A-lim (38), Kim Hyo-joo (12), Kim Sei-young (37), Cheyenne Knight (43), Ko Jin-young (19), Lydia Ko (1), Nelly Korda (15), Jennifer Kupcho (6), Alison Lee (47), Andrea Lee (14), Lee Jeong-eun (48), Minjee Lee (3), Lin Xiyu (8), Gaby López (25), Nanna Koerstz Madsen (28), Leona Maguire (17), Caroline Masson (60), Anna Nordqvist (58), Ryann O'Toole (46), Paula Reto (30), Madelene Sagström (23), Lizette Salas (36), Yuka Saso (27), Sarah Schmelzel (44), Sophia Schubert (59), Hinako Shibuno (34), Maja Stark (50), Patty Tavatanakit (57), Atthaya Thitikul (2), Lexi Thompson (7), Lilia Vu (20), Amy Yang (53)

Linn Grant (52), Jessica Korda (33), and Inbee Park (51) did not participate, so Pornanong Phatlum (61), Stacy Lewis (62), and Ariya Jutanugarn (63) were added to the field.

== Results ==
=== First round ===
Lydia Ko, top-ranked on the CME list, grabbed the first round lead with a seven-under-par 65. Danielle Kang and Pajaree Anannarukarn tied for second place, one shot behind with a 66. Ko bogeyed the par-five, first hole before birdieing eight of the next 14 holes. The 65 is her lowest first-round score in the tournament. It is only the third time this year she scored a first-round score of 65 or better. She mentioned the condition early on, "The first four holes into the wind is a beast. It's a beast without the wind. So I knew that if I could just hang on and just stay patient, there was going to be a lot of opportunities, and I was able to grab a lot of them in the back nine." Nelly Korda, the present #1 world ranked player agreed saying, "It was kind of sporadically windy." Gemma Dryburgh and Kim Hyo-joo are tied for fourth-place with a five-under-par 67. Korda is tied with six others for sixth-place with a four-under-par 68.

Before the tournament, Ko was ranked first in putts per greens in regulation (1.725), first in sand saves (66.23%), and second in putting average (28.68).

=== Second round ===
Lydia Ko increased her lead with a bogey-free six-under-par 66 to take a five-stroke lead after 36 holes, with a 13-under-par total 131. She has missed only one fairway in the two rounds, recording six birdies. The 66 was her 27th score in the 60s in her last 35 rounds. Kim Hyo-joo was in second place with a three-under 69, eight-under-par 136 total. Nelly Korda carded four birdies and one bogey on the front nine, before nine consecutive pars on the back nine for a three-under-par 69 and seven-under 137 total. She was tied for third-place with three other players. Ko missed no fairways in this round, hit 13 greens, and took only 25 putts.

=== Third round ===
Ko had a five-shot lead over the field at the start, but by late afternoon Leona Maguire had shot a bogey-free 9-under 63 (one-off Ko's record 62 in 2016) to take a share of the lead at 15-under par, after trailing by seven before the round. Ko shot a two-under-par 70, with her and Maguire having the same five-shot lead over the other 58 players that Ko had by herself before the round. Ko hit an average 255.5 yards (233.6 m) in this round, contrasted to the 260.5 yards (238.2 m) she did in round one. She needed 27, 25 and 28 putts to get through rounds one, two and three respectively. Maguire had birdies on holes one and three, then five more birdies between holes eight and 13. Two more birdies at 16 and 17 gave her a one-stroke lead before Ko birdied the 17th to make the tie. Maguire has made 12 birdies and no bogeys over her past 27 holes.

=== Fourth round ===
Lydia Ko staved off challenges from third-round co-leader Leona Maguire, and a late-charge from Anna Nordqvist on a cold and windy Sunday to win her third tournament of the season. Ko's second-consecutive two-under 70 was enough to win her 19th career LPGA title by two strokes over Maguire who shot a par-72 and three over Nordqvist who shot a best-round 67. The victory gave Ko her second career Player of the Year honor and the Vare Trophy for lowest scoring average. Ko earned the largest payout in LPGA history, $2 million, while Maguire won $550,000 and Nordqvist $340,000. Ko also earned three more LPGA Hall of Fame points to give her 25, two shy of the 27 required for admission.

== Final leaderboard ==
Sunday, November 20, 2022

Place	Player	Score	To par	Money ($)
1	(New Zealand) Lydia Ko	65-66-70-70=271	−17	2,000,000
2	(Republic of Ireland) Leona Maguire	69-69-63-72=273	−15	550,000
3	(Sweden) Anna Nordqvist	68-69-70-67=274	−14	340,000
T4	(England) Georgia Hall	71-69-69-67=276	−12	222,500
T4	(South Korea) Lee Jeong-eun	70-68-68-70=276	−12	222,500
6	(Thailand) Pajaree Anannarukarn	66-73-69-70=278	−10	150,000
T7	(Scotland) Gemma Dryburgh	67-70-69-73=279	−9	105,667
T7	(Canada) Brooke Henderson	68-74-65-72=279	−9	105,667
T7	(South Korea) Kim Hyo-joo	67-69-72-71=279	−9	105,667
T10	(France) Céline Boutier	71-71-69-69=280	−8	83,500
T10	(United States) Nelly Korda	68-69-73-70=280	−8	83,500
T10	(Thailand) Atthaya Thitikul	73-67-71-69=280	−8	83,500
