= CME Group Tour Championship =

Women's professional golf tournament

Coordinates: 26.248°N 81.765°W

Tournament information
- Location: Naples, Florida
- Established: 2011
- Courses: Tiburón Golf Club, The Gold Course
- Par: 72
- Length: 6,556 yards (5,995 m)
- Tour: LPGA Tour
- Format: Stroke play - 72 holes
- Prize fund: $11 million
- Month played: November

Tournament record score
- Aggregate: 261 Amy Yang (2023)
- To par: −27 as above

Current champion
- (Thailand) Jeeno Thitikul

Location in the United States

The CME Group Tour Championship is a women's professional golf tournament, the season-ending event of the LPGA Tour. It succeeded the LPGA Tour Championship, which was played for two seasons in 2009 and 2010. From 2011 to 2013 the tournament was called the CME Group Titleholders. The tournament has a limited field of 60 players.

In 2014 the LPGA Tour introduced a season-long points race, the Race to the CME Globe, and a $1 million bonus. The CME Group Tour Championship marked the end of this season-long "Race". Each player's season-long "Race to the CME Globe" points were "reset" before the tournament based on their position in the points list. "Championship points" were then awarded to the top 40 players in the CME Group Tour Championship which were added to their "reset points" to determine the overall winner of the "Race to the CME Globe".

The title sponsor is the CME Group, a global derivatives marketplace based in Chicago. LPGA Commissioner Michael Whan announced on March 7, 2011, that CME had signed a three-year contract to sponsor the tournament. CME had previous experience hosting pro-am events with LPGA players.

The first tournament was played in November 2011 at Grand Cypress Golf Club in Orlando, Florida, which had hosted the 2010 LPGA Tour Championship. In 2012, the tournament moved to the Eagle Course of the TwinEagles Club, in Naples, Florida. Since 2013, it has been played in Naples at the Gold Course of the Tiburón Golf Club.

The 2011 winner earned $500,000, a full one-third of the $1.5 million purse. The first-place money was the second highest in women's golf, exceeded only by the U.S. Women's Open. Most events on the LPGA Tour have a standard schedule for distribution of the purse, with a winner's share of 15%. The 2010 LPGA Tour Championship had the same purse of $1.5 million, with a winner's share of $225,000 but it was a 120-player event rather than the limited field of the 2011 event. The purse was raised to $2 million in 2013, with a 35% winner's share of $700,000, the highest of the year. For 2014 the purse was maintained at $2 million but, with the introduction of the "Race to the CME Globe", the winner's share was reduced to one-quarter at $500,000, second only to the U.S. Women's Open. In 2019, the purse increased to $5 million with $1.5 million going to the winner, the largest winner's share in women's golf.

They announced on November 17, 2021, that the 2022 Championship purse will again increase, to a record $7 million, with $2 million to the winner, the largest ever for an LPGA tournament. The minimum pay for any of the 60 entrants will be $40,000. On November 15, 2023, they announced the purse will increase in 2024 to a new record of $11 million, with $4 million for the winner, and second-place will increase to $1 million. In addition, every competitor who qualifies for the 60-golfer field will be awarded at least $55,000

== Tournament names ==
- 2011–2013: CME Group Titleholders
- 2014–present: CME Group Tour Championship

== Winners ==
Year	Date	Champion	Score	To par	Margin of victory	Runner(s)-up	Course	Purse ($)	Winner's share ($)
2025	Nov 24	(Thailand) Jeeno Thitikul (2)	67-63-64-68=262	−26	4 strokes	(Thailand) Pajaree Anannarukarn	Tiburón Golf Club, Gold Course	11,000,000	4,000,000
2024	Nov 24	(Thailand) Jeeno Thitikul	71-67-63-65=266	−22	1 stroke	(United States) Angel Yin	Tiburón Golf Club, Gold Course	11,000,000	4,000,000
2023	Nov 19	(South Korea) Amy Yang	68-63-64-66=261	−27	3 strokes	(Japan) Nasa Hataoka (United States) Alison Lee	Tiburón Golf Club, Gold Course	7,000,000	2,000,000
2022	Nov 20	(New Zealand) Lydia Ko (2)	65-66-70-70=271	−17	2 strokes	(Republic of Ireland) Leona Maguire	Tiburón Golf Club, Gold Course	7,000,000	2,000,000
2021	Nov 21	(South Korea) Ko Jin-young (2)	69-67-66-63=265	–23	1 stroke	(Japan) Nasa Hataoka	Tiburón Golf Club, Gold Course	5,000,000	1,500,000
2020	Dec 20	(South Korea) Ko Jin-young	68-67-69-66=270	−18	5 strokes	(Australia) Hannah Green (South Korea) Kim Sei-young	Tiburón Golf Club, Gold Course	3,000,000	1,100,000
2019	Nov 24	(South Korea) Kim Sei-young	65-67-68-70=270	−18	1 stroke	(England) Charley Hull	Tiburón Golf Club, Gold Course	5,000,000	1,500,000
2018	Nov 18	(United States) Lexi Thompson	65-67-68-70=270	−18	4 strokes	(United States) Nelly Korda	Tiburón Golf Club, Gold Course	2,500,000	500,000
2017	Nov 19	(Thailand) Ariya Jutanugarn	68-71-67-67=273	−15	1 stroke	(United States) Jessica Korda (United States) Lexi Thompson	Tiburón Golf Club, Gold Course	2,500,000	500,000
2016	Nov 20	(England) Charley Hull	67-70-66-66=269	−19	2 strokes	(South Korea) Ryu So-yeon	Tiburón Golf Club, Gold Course	2,000,000	500,000
2015	Nov 22	(United States) Cristie Kerr	68-69-66-68=271	−17	1 stroke	(South Korea) Jang Ha-na (United States) Gerina Piller	Tiburón Golf Club, Gold Course	2,000,000	500,000
2014	Nov 23	(New Zealand) Lydia Ko	71-71-68-68=278	−10	Playoff	(Spain) Carlota Ciganda (Paraguay) Julieta Granada	Tiburón Golf Club, Gold Course	2,000,000	500,000
2013	Nov 24	(China) Shanshan Feng	66-74-67-66=273	−15	1 stroke	(United States) Gerina Piller	Tiburón Golf Club, Gold Course	2,000,000	700,000
2012	Nov 18	(South Korea) Choi Na-yeon	67-68-69-70=274	−14	2 strokes	(South Korea) Ryu So-yeon	TwinEagles Club, Eagle Course	1,500,000	500,000
2011	Nov 20	(South Korea) Park Hee-young	71-69-69-70=279	−9	2 strokes	(United States) Paula Creamer (Germany) Sandra Gal	Grand Cypress G.C. (N/S)	1,500,000	500,000

== Race to the CME Globe winners ==
Year	Winner	Points	Runner-up	Points
2025	(Thailand) Jeeno Thitikul	4,066.950	(Japan) Miyū Yamashita	2,790.261
2024	(United States) Nelly Korda	4,368.319	(South Korea) Ryu Hae-ran	2,888.392
2023	(United States) Lilia Vu	3,161.968	(France) Céline Boutier	3,123.983
2022	(New Zealand) Lydia Ko (3)	3,571.693	(Thailand) Jeeno Thitikul	2,760.127
2021	(South Korea) Ko Jin-young (2)	3,520.15	(United States) Nelly Korda	3,420.6
2020	(South Korea) Inbee Park	2,035	(United States) Danielle Kang	1,961
2019	(South Korea) Ko Jin-young	4,148	(Canada) Brooke Henderson	2,907
2018	(Thailand) Ariya Jutanugarn (2)	6,760	(Canada) Brooke Henderson	5,200
2017	(United States) Lexi Thompson	7,450	(South Korea) Park Sung-hyun	6,250
2016	(Thailand) Ariya Jutanugarn	6,800	(New Zealand) Lydia Ko	5,050
2015	(New Zealand) Lydia Ko (2)	6,000	(South Korea) Inbee Park	5,700
2014	(New Zealand) Lydia Ko	7,500	(United States) Stacy Lewis	5,650

== Tournament record ==
Year	Player	Score	Round
2016	Lydia Ko	62 (−10)	2nd
2025	Gaby López	62 (−10)	3rd

== See also ==
- ADT Championship
