= Park Hee-young =

South Korean professional golfer (born 1987)

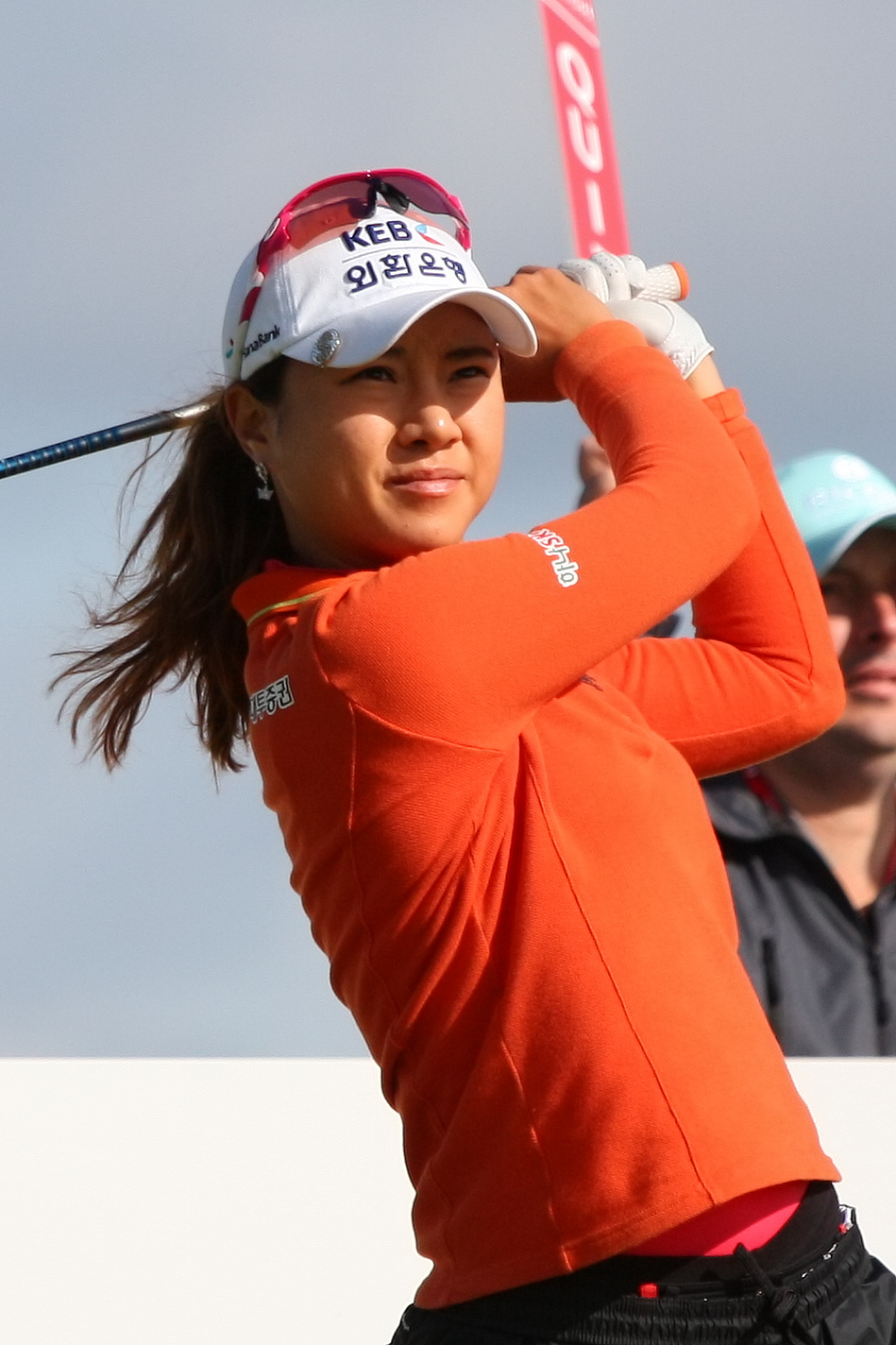
- Park at the 2013 Women's British Open

Personal information
- Nickname: Rocket
- Nationality: South Korea
- Born: 24 May 1987 (age 39) South Korea
- Height: 5 ft 6 in (1.68 m)

Career
- Sport: Golf
- Turned professional: 2004
- Former tours: LPGA (joined 2008); KLPGA (joined 2005)
- Professional wins: 10

Number of wins by tour
- LPGA Tour: 3
- LPGA of Korea Tour: 6
- Ladies Asian Golf Tour: 1
- WPGA Tour of Australasia: 1

Best results in LPGA major championships
- Chevron Championship: T7: 2013
- Women's PGA C'ship: T4: 2016
- U.S. Women's Open: T9: 2009
- Women's British Open: T2: 2013
- Evian Championship: T19: 2013

Achievements and awards
- KLPGA Rookie of the Year: 2005

- Park Hee-young
- Hangul: 박희영
- RR: Bak Huiyeong
- MR: Pak Hŭiyŏng

Park Hee-young (Korean: 박희영, born 24 May 1987) is a South Korean professional golfer. She played on the LPGA Tour.

== Early life and amateur career ==
In 1987, Park was born in South Korea. As an amateur, Park was a three time member of the South Korean National team. Park was twice runner-up in the South Korea Amateur Open.

== Professional career ==
In 2005, was Park's first full year as a professional golfer. She won three times on the LPGA of Korea Tour which earned her rookie of the year honors. Park won another two KLPGA tournaments in 2006.

Park earned her tour card at the 2007 LPGA qualifying school. She played in 28 LPGA events in 2008 and made the cut in 22 of them. Her best finish was a T4 and she earned $474,744 for the year, 35th on the tour's money list.

At the second LPGA event of 2009, the Honda LPGA Thailand, Park shot an opening round 79 in the tournament. Shortly after her round was completed, Park had to go to a hospital. She was treated and released. Park completed the tournament, shooting rounds of 64, 69, 65, which enabled her to finish in solo second place three shots behind Lorena Ochoa. Later in 2009, Park finished second at the Mizuno Classic.

On 20 November 2011, Park won her first LPGA Tour event, the CME Group Titleholders. She finished two shots ahead of Paula Creamer and Sandra Gal.

Her second victory came in July 2013 at the Manulife Financial LPGA Classic in Canada. Tied with Angela Stanford at 258 (–26) after 72 holes, the two went to a sudden-death playoff on the par-5 18th hole. Park birdied the hole three times in regulation (par on Friday) and three times in the playoff to win.

Park retired following the 2025 season.

== Personal life ==
As of 2011, Park's sister Ju Young was a player on the Korean LPGA Tour. Her sister began her rookie year on the LPGA Tour in 2015, after finishing in a tie for 11th place at Stage III of LPGA Q School in Daytona Beach, Florida. She played one event in 2016.

== Awards and honors ==
In 2005, she earned LPGA of Korea Tour's Rookie of the Year honors.

== Professional wins (10) ==
=== LPGA Tour wins (3) ===
No.	Date	Tournament	Winning score	To par	Margin of victory	Runner(s)-up	Winner's share ($)
1	20 Nov 2011	CME Group Titleholders	71-69-69-70=279	−9	2 strokes	(United States) Paula Creamer (Germany) Sandra Gal	500,000
2	14 Jul 2013	Manulife Financial LPGA Classic	65-67-61-65=258	−26	Playoff	(United States) Angela Stanford	195,000
3	9 Feb 2020	ISPS Handa Vic Open^	68-68-72-73=281	−8	Playoff	(South Korea) Choi Hye-jin (South Korea) Ryu So-yeon	165,000

^Co-sanctioned with the ALPG Tour

LPGA Tour playoff record (2–0)

No.	Year	Tournament	Opponent(s)	Result
1	2013	Manulife Financial LPGA Classic	(United States) Angela Stanford	Won with birdie on third extra hole
2	2020	ISPS Handa Vic Open	(South Korea) Choi Hye-jin (South Korea) Ryu So-yeon	Won with par on fourth extra hole Ryu eliminated by birdie on second hole

=== LPGA of Korea Tour wins (6) ===
- 2004 Hite Cup (as an amateur)
- 2005 PAVV Invitational, two other wins
- 2006 Phoenix Park Classic, Lake Hills Classic

=== Ladies Asian Golf Tour wins (1) ===
- 2006 Thailand Ladies Open

== Results in LPGA majors ==
Results not in chronological order.

Tournament	2007	2008	2009	2010	2011	2012	2013	2014	2015	2016	2017	2018	2019	2020	2021	2022	2023	2024
Chevron Championship	T30	T38	T53	T15	T70	T26	T7	T26	CUT	T45	CUT	T40	T52	CUT	T47	CUT		T62
U.S. Women's Open	CUT	CUT	T9	T41	T45	CUT	CUT	T15	CUT	T65	CUT			CUT	CUT			
Women's PGA Championship		CUT	CUT	CUT	T14	14	T51	CUT	CUT	T4	CUT	T49	CUT	T58	CUT			CUT
The Evian Championship ^							T19	T20	CUT	T36		CUT		NT	T25			
Women's British Open		T14	T11	T55	T43	T33	T2	67	CUT	CUT		T52						

^ The Evian Championship was added as a major in 2013

Top 10
Did not play

CUT = missed the halfway cut
NT = no tournament
"T" = tied

=== Summary ===
Tournament	Wins	2nd	3rd	Top-5	Top-10	Top-25	Events	Cuts made
Chevron Championship	0	0	0	0	1	2	17	13
U.S. Women's Open	0	0	0	0	1	2	13	5
Women's PGA Championship	0	0	0	1	1	3	15	6
The Evian Championship	0	0	0	0	0	3	6	4
Women's British Open	0	1	0	1	1	3	10	8
Totals	0	1	0	2	4	13	61	36

- Most consecutive cuts made – 8 (2010 U.S. Open – 2012 LPGA)
- Longest streak of top-10s – 1 (four times)

== LPGA Tour career summary ==
Year	Tournaments played	Cuts made	Wins	2nd	3rd	Top 10s	Best finish	Earnings ($)	Money list rank	Scoring average	Scoring rank
2004	1	1	0	0	0	0	T16	n/a		70.0	
2005	1	1	0	0	0	1	T4	63,544	n/a	71.67	
2006	1	1	0	0	0	0	T25	12,202	n/a	72.67	
2007	5	3	0	0	0	0	T12	53,246	n/a	74.26	
2008	28	22	0	0	0	4	4	474,744	35	71.78	27
2009	25	19	0	2	0	6	2	666,305	20	71.94	35
2010	22	17	0	0	0	6	T4	327,431	34	71.69	25
2011	21	19	1	0	1	3	1	851,781	12	72.42	37
2012	25	21	0	0	0	5	5	427,717	34	71.71	30
2013	26	24	1	1	1	5	1	848,676	10	71.07	19
2014	29	27	0	0	0	2	T7	447,658	40	71.39	28
2015	28	18	0	1	0	3	T2	347,523	52	71.99	56
2016	26	20	0	0	0	4	T4	527,393	34	71.25	35
2017	22	9	0	0	1	1	3	131,235	91	72.15	102
2018	20	15	0	0	0	0	T11	197,679	80	71.70	65
2019	16	12	0	0	0	0	T12	103,327	110	71.50	68
2020	14	8	1	0	0	1	1	224,002	53	72.77	96
2021	16	10	0	0	0	0	11	178,814	87	72.07	96
2022	8	5	0	0	0	0	26	40,244	157	73.35	n/a
2023	1	1	0	0	0	0	T16	n/a	n/a	69.75	n/a
2024	16	7	0	0	0	0	T31	83,464	142	72.60	138
2025	1	0	0	0	0	0	WD	0	n/a	81.00	n/a

Official through 2025 season

== Team appearances ==
Amateur

- Espirito Santo Trophy (representing South Korea): 2004
