= Gerina Piller =

American professional golfer (born 1985)

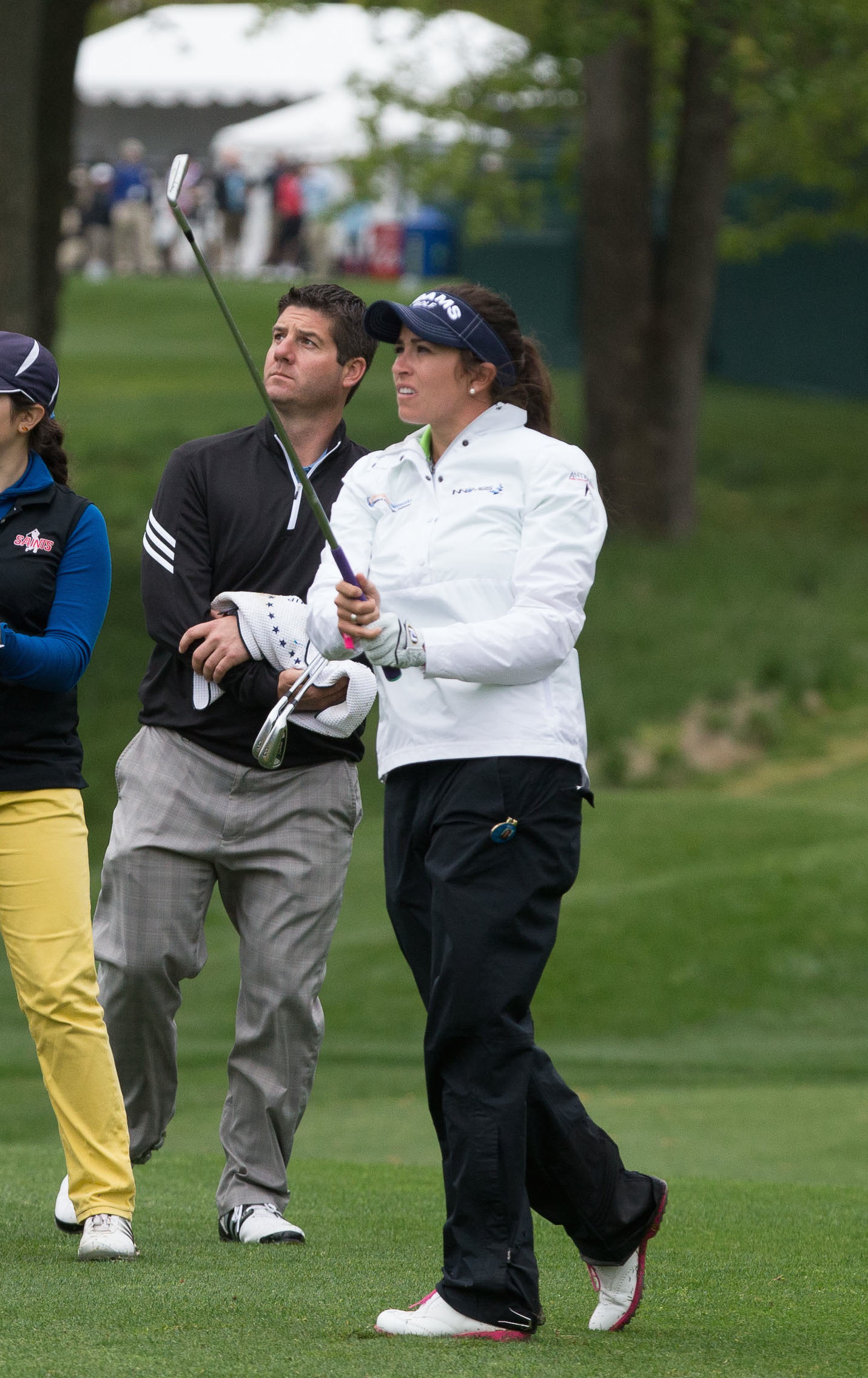
- Piller in 2013

Personal information
- Full name: Gerina Michelle Mendoza Piller
- Nationality: United States
- Born: March 29, 1985 (age 41) Roswell, New Mexico, U.S.
- Height: 5 ft 7 in (170 cm)
- Spouse: Martin Piller (m. 2011)
- Children: 1

Career
- Sport: Golf
- College: Texas-El Paso
- Turned professional: 2007
- Current tour: LPGA Tour (joined 2010)
- Former tour: Futures Tour (2007–10)

Best results in LPGA major championships
- Chevron Championship: T6: 2016
- Women's PGA C'ship: T6: 2012
- U.S. Women's Open: T5: 2019
- Women's British Open: T36: 2013, 2015
- Evian Championship: T9: 2016

Gerina Michelle Mendoza Piller (born March 29, 1985) is an American professional golfer, currently playing on the LPGA Tour. She turned pro in 2007 following a decorated career as a collegiate golfer at the University of Texas El Paso. In 2009, Mendoza appeared on the Golf Channel reality television competition The Big Break.

== Early life and amateur career ==
In 1985, she was born in Roswell, New Mexico. Gerina Mendoza attended Goddard High School and won the state golf championship in 2003 and also was an all-state volleyball player.

In 2003, she enrolled in at the University of Texas at El Paso (UTEP). She played all four years, winning four tournaments in her senior year. She was the 2007 Conference USA individual champion, Player of the Year, and the UTEP Female Athlete of the Year.

== Professional career ==
In 2007, Mendoza turned pro. She attempted to qualify that fall for the LPGA Tour. She did not succeed and played in 2008 on the Futures Tour. Mendoza attempted again to qualify for the LPGA Tour in 2008, again failing.

In an airing of 2009, filmed at an unknown time, Mendoza appeared on Big Break Prince Edward Island. Six women and six men competed for a grand prize of $100,000 in cash. Contestant Derek was the only male to reach the final four and prevailed in a 2-hole elimination match with Gerina by 1 stroke.

In 2009, she earned conditional status on the LPGA Tour for 2010 and played the entire season on the Duramed Futures Tour, where she recorded seven top-10 finishes and a career-best tie for second at both the iMPACT Classic and the USI Championship. She finished 5th on the Futures Tour money list in 2010, earning her full playing privileges on the LPGA Tour for 2011.

She finished 68th on the LPGA official money list in 2012, retaining her full playing card for 2012. Piller improved in 2012, with two top-ten finishes and a 48th-place finish on the year-end LPGA official money list.

== Personal life ==
Mendoza married fellow professional golfer Martin Piller in January 2011. They live in Flower Mound, Texas. She is of Mexican American descent.

Piller took a sabbatical from the LPGA Tour in 2018 due to the birth of her first child.

== Results in LPGA majors ==
Results not in chronological order before 2019.

Tournament	2011	2012	2013	2014	2015	2016	2017	2018	2019	2020	2021	2022
Chevron Championship		CUT	T41	T11	T20	T6	T35		CUT	CUT	T40	
U.S. Women's Open		T50	T31	T63	T53	T8	T33		T5	CUT		
Women's PGA Championship	CUT	T6	CUT	T13	T9	T12	T14		CUT	CUT	T40	T68
The Evian Championship ^			T67	69	T29	T9	T26		T44	NT	CUT	
Women's British Open	CUT	CUT	T36	CUT	T36	T50	CUT		T70	CUT	T48	

^ The Evian Championship was added as a major in 2013

Top 10
Did not play

CUT = missed the half-way cut
NT = no tournament
T = tied

=== Summary ===
Tournament	Wins	2nd	3rd	Top-5	Top-10	Top-25	Events	Cuts made
Chevron Championship	0	0	0	0	1	3	9	6
U.S. Women's Open	0	0	0	1	2	2	8	7
Women's PGA Championship	0	0	0	0	2	5	11	7
The Evian Championship	0	0	0	0	1	1	7	6
Women's British Open	0	0	0	0	0	0	10	5
Totals	0	0	0	1	6	11	45	31

- Most consecutive cuts made – 15 (2014 LPGA – 2017 U.S. Open)
- Longest streak of top-10s – 1 (six times)

== LPGA Tour career summary ==
Year	Tournaments played	Cuts made*	Wins	2nd	3rd	Top 10s	Best finish	Earnings ($)	Money list rank	Scoring average	Scoring rank
2011	14	9	0	0	0	1	T10	103,322	68	72.75	61
2012	24	17	0	0	0	2	T6	258,395	48	71.41	64
2013	26	23	0	1	0	8	2	572,690	26	71.22	23
2014	26	22	0	0	1	5	T3	466,497	39	71.38	26
2015	26	22	0	2	0	6	T2	727,681	18	71.21	21
2016	23	20	0	1	2	9	T2	842,899	19	70.58	17
2017	22	21	0	0	1	5	T3	541,977	34	70.60	26
2018	Maternity leave										
2019	23	14	0	0	0	2	T5	320,502	62	72.47	122
2020	14	8	0	0	0	0	T33	37,411	115	72.74	94
2021	21	12	0	0	0	1	T9	199,594	84	71.26	62
2022	16	9	0	0	0	1	T6	152,172	104	72.28	120
2023	3	3	0	0	0	0	T22	35,860	166	70.10	n/a

- Official through 2023 season.

* Includes matchplay and other events without a cut.

== World ranking ==
Position in Women's World Golf Rankings at the end of each calendar year.

Year	Ranking	Source
2008	630	
2009	411	
2010	334	
2011	215	
2012	95	
2013	37	
2014	40	
2015	29	
2016	19	
2017	41	
2018	184	
2019	116	
2020	143	
2021	191	
2022	209	
2023	453	
2024	974	

== Team appearances ==
Professional

- Solheim Cup (representing the United States): 2013, 2015 (winners), 2017 (winners)
- International Crown (representing the United States): 2016 (winners)

=== Solheim Cup record ===
Year	Total Matches	Total W–L–H	Singles W–L–H	Foursomes W–L–H	Fourballs W–L–H	Points Won	Points %
Career	11	5–4–2	2–0–1	1–2–0	2–2–1	6	54.6
2013	3	0–2–1	0–0–1 halved w/ C. Matthew	0–0–0	0–2–0 lost w/ A. Stanford 2&1 lost w/ A. Stanford 1 dn	0.5	16.7
2015	4	3–0–1	1–0–0 def. C. Masson 1 up	1–0–0 won w/ S. Lewis 5&4	1–0–1 halved w/ B.Lang won w/ S. Lewis 1 up	3.5	87.5
2017	4	2–2–0	1–0–0 def. F. Parker 4&2	0–2–0 lost w/ S. Lewis 1 dn lost w/ S. Lewis 2&1	1–0–0 won w/ S. Lewis 2&1	2	50.0
