= Mina Harigae =

American professional golfer (born 1989)

Personal information
- Full name: Mina Harigae Kreiter
- Nationality: United States
- Born: November 1, 1989 (age 37) Monterey, California, U.S.
- Height: 5 ft 4 in (1.63 m)

Career
- Sport: Golf
- College: Duke University
- Turned professional: 2009
- Current tour: LPGA Tour (joined 2010)
- Former tour: Futures Tour (2009)
- Professional wins: 8

Number of wins by tour
- Epson Tour: 3
- Other: 4

Best results in LPGA major championships
- Chevron Championship: T32: 2013
- Women's PGA C'ship: T13: 2020
- U.S. Women's Open: 2nd: 2022
- Women's British Open: T13: 2021
- Evian Championship: T24: 2014

Achievements and awards
- Futures Tour Rookie of the Year: 2009
- Futures Tour Player of the Year: 2009

Mina Harigae (born November 1, 1989) is an American professional golfer currently playing on the LPGA Tour.

As an amateur golfer, she won the 2007 U.S. Women's Amateur Public Links. Harigae won the California Women's Amateur Championship for four consecutive years (2001–2005); her first victory came as a 12-year-old.

== Childhood and family life ==
Born to Japanese parents, Harigae attended the Stevenson School. Her parents run a sushi restaurant in Pacific Grove, California called Takara Sushi. She attended Duke University, leaving after a year to pursue a professional golf career.

== Amateur career ==
Harigae is the youngest winner of the California Women's Amateur Championship, accomplishing the feat in 2001 at the age of 12.

- Won the 2007 U.S. Women's Amateur Public Links
- Reached the Semifinals at the 2003 and 2006 U.S. Girls' Junior. Was the stroke-play medalist at the 2006 U.S. Girls' Junior.
- Reached third round of the U.S. Women's Amateur in 2004 and 2006; advanced to the first round of match play at the 2008.
- Four-time winner of the California Women's Amateur Championship (2001–2004).
- Member of the U.S. Junior Ryder Cup team in 2004 and Junior Solheim Cup team in 2007.
- Member of the 2008 U.S. Curtis Cup Team.
- Three-time Rolex AJGA Junior All-American First Team selection.

== Professional career ==
In 2009, Harigae played on the Futures Tour, the LPGA Tour's developmental tour. She won three tournaments and was the tour's leading money winner, which earned her membership on the LPGA Tour for the 2010 season. She won her largest payday, $1,080,000 for a second-place finish at the U.S. Women's Open on June 5, 2022, losing by 4 strokes to Minjee Lee. Lee won the largest purse to date in women's history $1.8 million in that tournament's largest prize total ever, $10 million.

== Personal life ==
Harigae married Travis Kreiter, her caddie, in March 2023. She has competed as Mina Kreiter since 2024

== Professional wins (8) ==
=== Futures Tour wins (3) ===
- 2009 (3) Ladies Titan Tire Challenge, Michelob Ultra Duramed Futures Players Championship, Falls Auto Group Classic

=== Cactus Tour wins (4) ===
- 2020 (4) Longbow Golf Club, Desert Canyon Golf Club, Orange Tree, Talking Stick North Course

=== Other wins (1) ===
- 2025 TaylorMade Pebble Beach Invitational

== Results in LPGA majors ==
Results not in chronological order.

Tournament	2007	2008	2009	2010	2011	2012	2013	2014	2015	2016	2017	2018	2019	2020	2021	2022	2023	2024
Chevron Championship		CUT			CUT	T38	T32	T67	T51						CUT	CUT	CUT	
U.S. Women's Open	T66	CUT	T67	CUT	T34	T28	CUT	T38	CUT	T30				T61	T30	2	T33	
Women's PGA Championship				T59	CUT	T15	T22	T69	T65	CUT	CUT	CUT	CUT	T13	T46	CUT	T24	CUT
The Evian Championship ^							T27	T24	T64		CUT	CUT	CUT	NT	T29	CUT	CUT	
Women's British Open					CUT	CUT	CUT	T29	T69	CUT		T28			T13	CUT	T44	

^ The Evian Championship was added as a major in 2013.

Top 10
Did not play

CUT = missed the half-way cut
NT = no tournament
"T" = tied

=== Summary ===
Tournament	Wins	2nd	3rd	Top-5	Top-10	Top-25	Events	Cuts made
Chevron Championship	0	0	0	0	0	0	9	4
Women's PGA Championship	0	0	0	0	0	4	15	8
U.S. Women's Open	0	1	0	1	1	1	13	9
The Evian Championship	0	0	0	0	0	1	9	4
Women's British Open	0	0	0	0	0	1	10	5
Totals	0	1	0	1	1	7	56	30

- Most consecutive cuts made – 8 (2013 Evian – 2015 WPGA)
- Longest streak of top-10s – 1

== LPGA Tour career summary ==
Year	Tournaments played	Cuts made	Wins	2nd	3rd	Top 10s	Best finish	Earnings ($)	Money list rank	Scoring average	Scoring rank
2007	1	1	0	0	0	0	T66	n/a	n/a	76.25	n/a
2008	2	0	0	0	0	0	MC	n/a	n/a	77.25	n/a
2010	15	9	0	0	0	1	T8	90,205	77	72.64	58
2011	17	13	0	0	0	1	T6	178,683	49	72.54	41
2012	26	19	0	0	0	1	T7	304,057	44	72.33	47
2013	26	20	0	0	0	1	T5	285,195	49	71.98	47
2014	27	24	0	0	0	2	T8	324,439	50	71.88	52
2015	25	17	0	0	0	0	T16	130,703	82	72.73	90
2016	19	9	0	0	0	0	T31	46,508	120	72.74	108
2017	17	7	0	0	0	1	T10	79,636	116	71.74	74
2018	21	12	0	0	0	2	T7	188,279	83	71.59	58
2019	21	11	0	0	0	1	T9	103,608	109	72.27	114
2020	11	9	0	0	0	4	4	327,376	34	71.03	16
2021	21	18	0	1	1	5	T2	791,757	22	70.76	37
2022	23	15	0	1	0	1	2	1,293,471	15	71.35	71
2023	23	11	0	0	0	0	T24	269,689	85	71.78	87
2024	14	4	0	0	0	0	T27	40,923	167	73.29	154
2025	7	4	0	0	0	0	T49	33,845	155	71.90	n/a
Totals^	316	203	0	2	1	20	2	4,488,373	115		

^ Official as of 2025 season
* Includes matchplay and other tournaments without a cut.

== Futures Tour career summary ==
Year	Tournaments played	Cuts made	Wins	Top 10s	Best finish	Earnings ($)	Money list rank	Scoring average	Scoring rank
2009	16	15	3	10	1	88,386	1	70.89	2

== World ranking ==
Position in Women's World Golf Rankings at the end of each calendar year.

Year	World ranking	Source
2012	81	
2013	93	
2014	89	
2015	163	
2016	349	
2017	293	
2018	161	
2019	230	
2020	91	
2021	48	
2022	51	
2023	124	
2024	417	
2025	688	

== Team appearances ==
Amateur

- Junior Ryder Cup (representing the United States): 2004
- Junior Solheim Cup (representing the United States): 2007
- Curtis Cup (representing the United States): 2008 (winners)

Professional

- Solheim Cup (representing the United States): 2021

=== Solheim Cup record ===
Year	Total matches	Total W–L–H	Singles W–L–H	Foursomes W–L–H	Fourballs W–L–H	Points won	Points %
Career	3	1–2–0	0–1–0	0–0–0	1–1–0	1	33.3
2021	3	1–2–0	0–1–0 lost to C. Boutier 5&4		1–1–0 lost w/ L. Thompson 5&4 won w/ Y. Noh 3&1	1	33.3
