= Moriya Jutanugarn =

Thai professional golfer (born 1994)

Moriya Jutanugarn โมรียา จุฑานุกาล
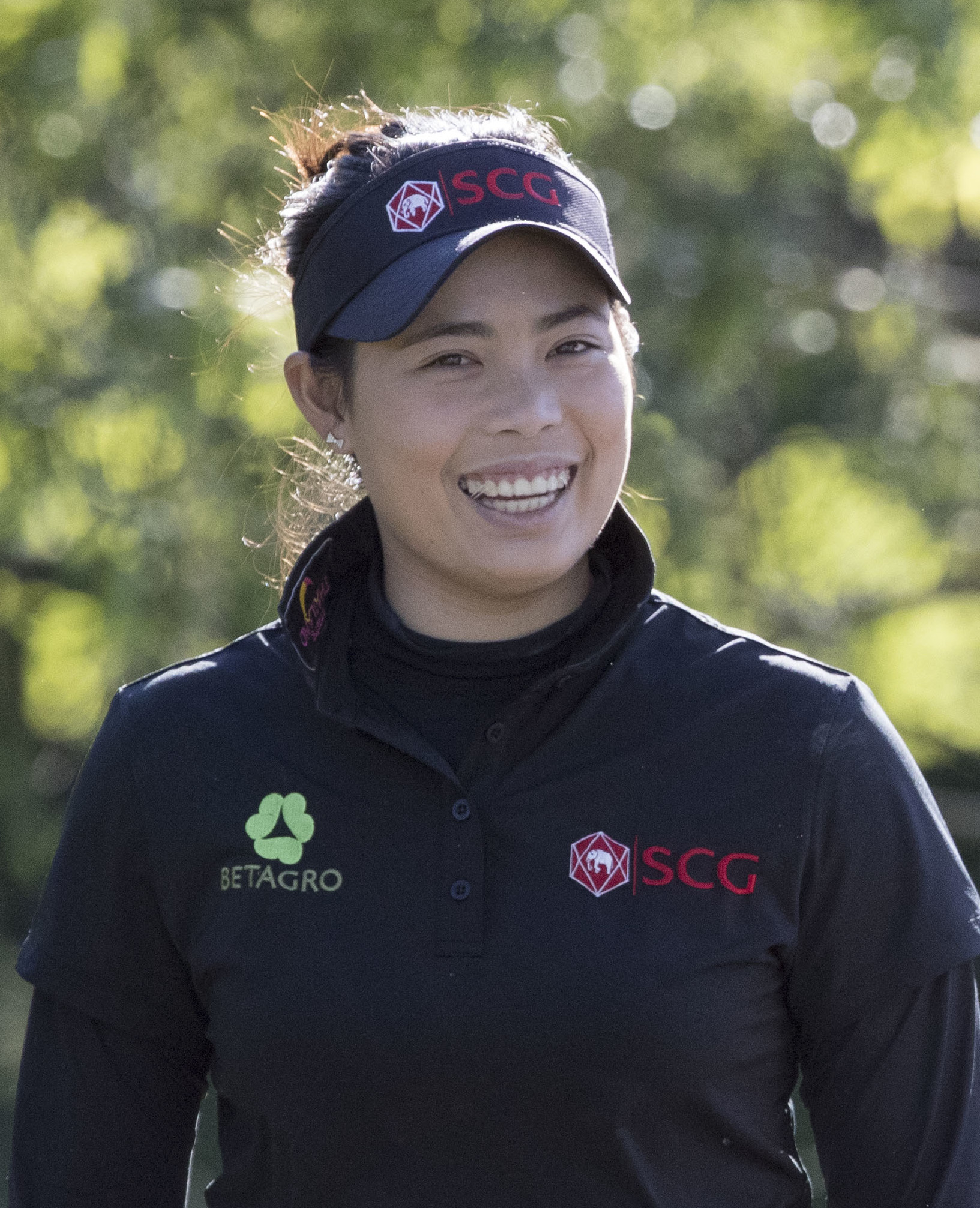

Personal information
- Nickname: Mo
- Nationality: Thailand
- Born: 28 July 1994 (age 32) Bangkok, Thailand
- Height: 5 ft 1 in (1.55 m)

Career
- Sport: Golf
- Turned professional: 2012
- Current tour: LPGA Tour (joined 2013)
- Professional wins: 3

Number of wins by tour
- LPGA Tour: 3

Best results in LPGA major championships
- Chevron Championship: T6: 2018
- Women's PGA C'ship: T11: 2018
- U.S. Women's Open: T6: 2020
- Women's British Open: 9th: 2021
- Evian Championship: T3: 2017

Achievements and awards
- LPGA Rookie of the Year: 2013

Moriya Jutanugarn (Thai: โมรียา จุฑานุกาล; RTGS: Moriya Chuthanukan; born 28 July 1994) is a Thai professional golfer.

In 2009, Jutanugarn became the first female to win the Duke of York Young Champions Trophy. In 2013, she was named LPGA Rookie of the Year. She has played on the LPGA Tour since 2013.

Her sister, Ariya, also plays on the LPGA Tour. Moriya won her first event in her 156th start at the 2018 Hugel-JTBC LA Open. Moriya and Ariya are the second set of sisters to win on the LPGA, after Charlotta and Annika Sörenstam. In July 2021, she secured her second LPGA win alongside her sister, Ariya, at the Dow Great Lakes Bay Invitational in Michigan.

== Amateur wins ==
this list may be incomplete

- 2008 Junior Open Championship
- 2009 Duke of York Young Champions Trophy
- 2012 South Atlantic Ladies Amateur

== Professional wins (3) ==
=== LPGA Tour wins (3) ===
No.	Date	Tournament	Winning score	To par	Margin of victory	Runners-up
1	22 Apr 2018	Hugel-JTBC LA Open	68-66-70-68=272	−12	2 strokes	(South Korea) Ko Jin-young (South Korea) Inbee Park
2	17 Jul 2021	Dow Great Lakes Bay Invitational (with (Thailand) Ariya Jutanugarn)	67-59-71-59=256	−24	3 strokes	(United States) Cydney Clanton and (Thailand) Thidapa Suwannapura
3	4 Aug 2024	Portland Classic	67-69-64-66=266	−22	2 strokes	(South Korea) An Na-rin (Russia) Nataliya Guseva (United States) Angel Yin

== Results in LPGA majors ==
Results not in chronological order.

Tournament	2011	2012	2013	2014	2015	2016	2017	2018	2019	2020
Chevron Championship		T44	T13	CUT	T11	CUT	T47	T6	T12	T18
Women's PGA Championship			T64	T40	T34	T26	T20	T11	T26	T18
U.S. Women's Open	T32	CUT		T49	CUT	T55	T15	T41	T50	T6
The Evian Championship ^			CUT	T10	77	T30	T3	T44	T6	NT
Women's British Open			T52		CUT	T43	T16	T42	T11	T56

Tournament	2021	2022	2023	2024	2025	2026
Chevron Championship	T10	T44	CUT	T62	CUT	CUT
U.S. Women's Open	CUT	T11	73	CUT	CUT	
Women's PGA Championship	T27	T54	T57	T60	T69	CUT
The Evian Championship ^	T19	T31	T28	CUT	CUT	
Women's British Open	9	CUT	T56	CUT	CUT	

^ The Evian Championship was added as a major in 2013.

Top 10
Did not play

CUT = missed the half-way cut
NT = no tournament
"T" = tied

=== Summary ===
Tournament	Wins	2nd	3rd	Top-5	Top-10	Top-25	Events	Cuts made
Chevron Championship	0	0	0	0	2	6	15	10
U.S. Women's Open	0	0	0	0	1	3	14	9
Women's PGA Championship	0	0	0	0	0	3	14	13
The Evian Championship	0	0	1	1	3	4	12	9
Women's British Open	0	0	0	0	1	3	12	8
Totals	0	0	1	1	7	19	67	49

- Most consecutive cuts made – 23 (2016 U.S. Open – 2021 ANA Inspiration)
- Longest streak of top-10s – 2 (2020 U.S. Open – 2021 ANA Inspiration)

== LPGA Tour career summary ==
Year	Tournaments played	Cuts made *	Wins	2nd	3rd	Top 10s	Best finish	Earnings ($)	Money list rank	Scoring average	Scoring rank
2011	3	2	0	0	0	0	T32	0	n/a	73.20	n/a
2012	3	1	0	0	0	0	T44	0	n/a	74.88	n/a
2013	24	19	0	0	0	1	T4	293,158	47	72.09	53
2014	30	23	0	0	0	2	T5	295,473	56	72.34	72
2015	29	20	0	0	0	2	T8	281,940	64	72.15	66
2016	29	24	0	0	0	2	4	446,948	40	71.75	60
2017	28	27	0	2	2	11	2	1,320,900	9	69.75	7
2018	28	26	1	1	1	8	1	1,003,169	14	70.55	20
2019	29	25	0	1	1	7	T2	785,105	25	70.78	31
2020	13	13	0	0	1	3	T3	551,475	16	70.62	10
2021	23	17	1	1	0	6	1	948,950	16	70.16	19
2022	28	20	0	0	0	2	T5	615,048	51	71.11	55
2023	23	16	0	0	0	1	T7	302,209	80	71.63	80
2024	27	18	1	0	0	2	1	612,518	64	71.86	84
2025	17	7	0	0	0	1	T4	162,539	114	73.36	146
Totals^	328	252	3	5	5	48	1	7,619,432	48		

^ As of 2025 season
* Includes matchplay and other events without a cut.

== Team appearances ==
Amateur

- Espirito Santo Trophy (representing Thailand): 2008

Professional

- International Crown (representing Thailand): 2014, 2016, 2018, 2023 (winners)
- Amata Friendship Cup (representing Thailand): 2018 (winners)
