= Sandra Gal =

German professional golfer (born 1985)

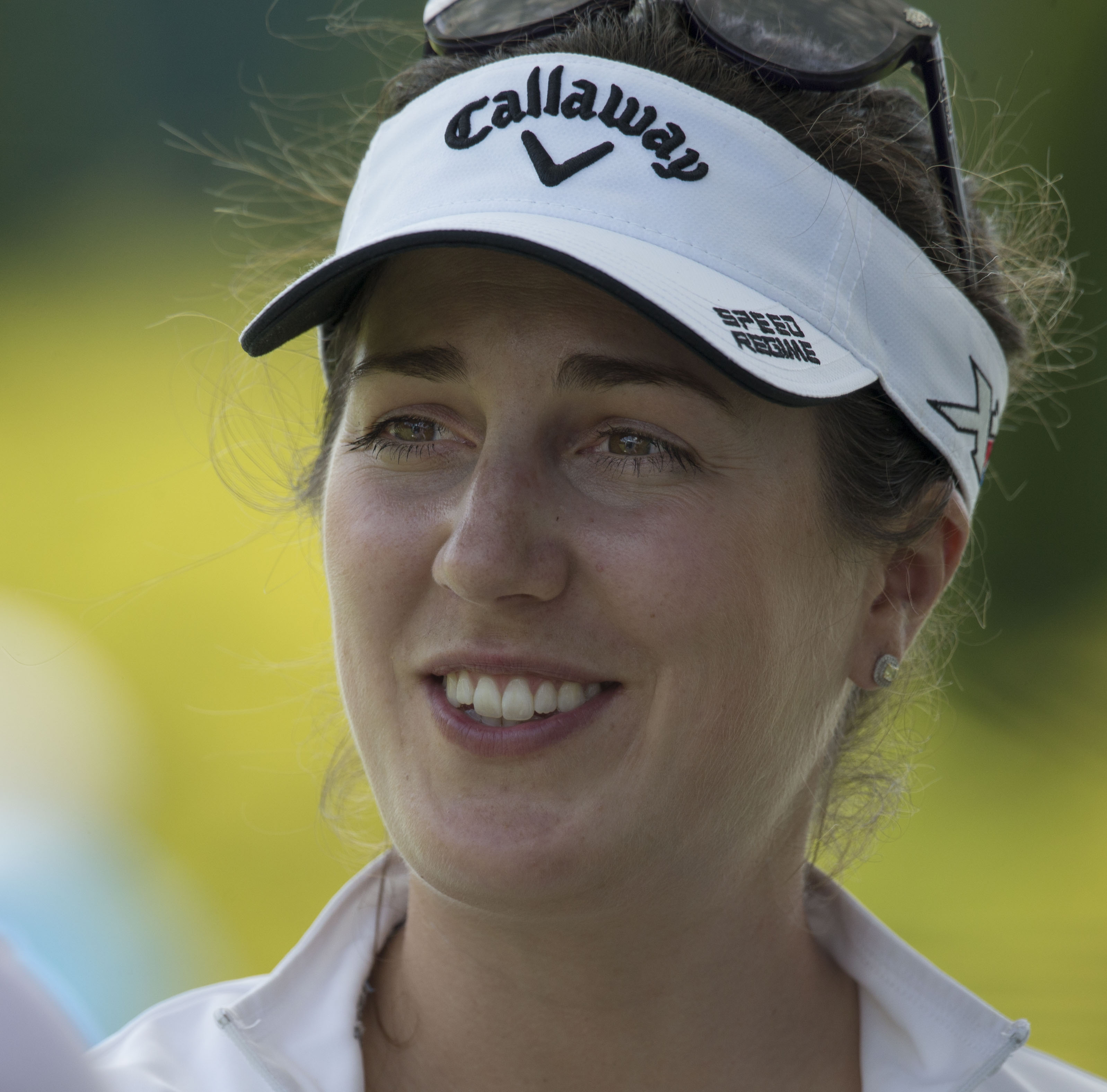
- Gal at the 2015 Kingsmill Championship

Personal information
- Nationality: Germany
- Born: 9 May 1985 (age 41) Düsseldorf, West Germany (now Germany)
- Height: 6 ft 0 in (1.83 m)

Career
- Sport: Golf
- College: University of Florida
- Turned professional: 2007
- Current tour: LPGA Tour (joined 2008)
- Professional wins: 1

Number of wins by tour
- LPGA Tour: 1

Best results in LPGA major championships
- Chevron Championship: T15: 2011
- Women's PGA C'ship: 12th/T12: 2012, 2015
- U.S. Women's Open: 3rd: 2012
- Women's British Open: T25: 2013
- Evian Championship: T14: 2017

Sandra Gal (born 9 May 1985) is a German professional golfer who currently plays on the United States–based LPGA Tour.

== Childhood, college and amateur career ==
Born in Düsseldorf, Germany, Gal began playing golf at age five during family vacations to golf resorts around Europe. At age 17 she joined the German National Team and at 18 won the German National Girls Championship. She graduated from high school in 2004.

While still competing on the German National Team, Gal attended college in the United States at the University of Florida in Gainesville. She played for the Florida Gators women's golf team from 2005 to 2007 and won four events in NCAA competition, received First Team All-American honors in 2007, and was an NGCA Academic All-American from 2005 to 2008.

In 2007, she won the Ladies European Amateur, and later that fall, entered the LPGA Qualifying Tournament where she qualified for the LPGA Tour for 2008 and immediately turned pro. Although by turning pro she could no longer participate in collegiate golf, she completed her degree requirements while playing full-time on the LPGA Tour and graduated with honors from Florida in August 2008 with a bachelor's degree in advertising.

== Professional career ==
Gal tied for 14th in the 2007 LPGA Final Qualifying Tournament to earn full playing privileges on the LPGA in 2008; she turned professional immediately following the tournament.

In her fourth season on the LPGA Tour in 2011, Gal won her first event at the Kia Classic in late March. She finished the 72-hole event at 16-under-par, one stroke ahead of runner-up Jiyai Shin Previously her best finish had been fifth at the 2009 LPGA Corning Classic. Also in 2009, she recorded two career-low rounds of 64.

She is only the second German player after Tina Fischer to win on the LPGA Tour.

Gal was a member of the winning European Solheim Cup Team in 2011 and also played on the European Solheim Cup Team in 2015.

In 2016, Gal participated at the Summer Olympics in Rio de Janeiro, Brazil where she finished in the position of T25.

== Coaching staff ==
Gal's swing coach is Mitchell Spearman and her fitness coach is the fitness trainer of the National Golf Team Germany, Christian Marysko. Beginning in September 2016, her new caddie is Oliver Brett.

== Professional wins (1) ==
=== LPGA Tour (1) ===
No.	Date	Tournament	Winning score	To par	Margin of victory	Runner-up	Winner's share ($)
1	27 Mar 2011	Kia Classic	67-68-70-71=276	–16	1 stroke	(South Korea) Jiyai Shin	255,000

== Results in LPGA majors ==
Results not in chronological order before 2019.

Tournament	2006	2007	2008	2009	2010	2011	2012	2013	2014	2015	2016	2017	2018	2019	2020
ANA Inspiration				CUT	T34	T15	T38	CUT	T34	T46	CUT	CUT	T48	T44	
U.S. Women's Open	CUT			T40	51	T34	3	CUT	T22	CUT	CUT	T27	CUT	CUT	
Women's PGA Championship			T56	T49	CUT	CUT	T12	CUT	T22	12	T30	CUT	T40	T66	CUT
The Evian Championship ^								T19	T32	T50	T64	T14	T37	CUT	NT
Women's British Open			CUT	T33	CUT	T54	CUT	T25	CUT	T36	T47	T49	T22	CUT	69

^ The Evian Championship was added as a major in 2013

Top 10
Did not play

DNP = did not play
CUT = missed the half-way cut
NT = no tournament
T = tied

=== Summary ===
Tournament	Wins	2nd	3rd	Top-5	Top-10	Top-25	Events	Cuts made
ANA Inspiration	0	0	0	0	0	1	11	7
U.S. Women's Open	0	0	1	1	1	2	12	6
Women's PGA Championship	0	0	0	0	0	3	13	8
The Evian Championship	0	0	0	0	0	2	7	6
Women's British Open	0	0	0	0	0	2	13	8
Totals	0	0	1	1	1	10	56	35

- Most consecutive cuts made – 5 (2011 U.S. Open – 2012 U.S. Open)
- Longest streak of top-10s – 1

== LPGA Tour career summary ==
Year	Tournaments played	Cuts made	Wins	2nd	3rd	Top 10s	Best finish	Earnings ($)	Money list rank	Scoring average	Scoring rank
2006	1	0	0	0	0	0	CUT	n/a		78.00	
2008	22	17	0	0	0	0	T14	181,162	68	72.03	40
2009	23	17	0	0	0	2	T5	298,763	46	72.12	41
2010	22	15	0	0	0	0	T11	106,388	67	73.39	94
2011	20	17	1	1	0	5	1	623,526	20	71.64	19
2012	26	23	0	0	1	2	3	574,323	25	71.80	32
2013	25	20	0	0	0	4	4	420,137	35	71.25	25
2014	27	20	0	0	0	5	T5	504,518	36	71.27	21
2015	27	26	0	0	0	3	T5	531,961	30	71.17	17
2016	26	20	0	0	0	2	T4	306,799	62	71.71	56
2017	27	18	0	0	0	2	T7	318,529	59	71.79	80
2018	25	17	0	0	1	3	T3	373,846	58	71.28	39
2019	17	8	0	0	0	0	T11	83,552	116	72.82	139
2020	5	2	0	0	0	0	T48	13,476	144	73.57	n/a
2021	5	1	0	0	0	0	71	5,923	175	73.50	n/a
2022	1	0	0	0	0	0	CUT	0	n/a	75.50	n/a
2023	Did not play										
2024	11	6	0	0	0	0	T30	47,264	163	72.43	126
2025	1	1	0	0	0	0	T58	6,381	180	73.75	n/a

Official through 2025 season

== World ranking ==
Position in Women's World Golf Rankings at the end of each calendar year.

Year	World ranking	Source
2007	694	
2008	124	
2009	73	
2010	124	
2011	41	
2012	33	
2013	45	
2014	50	
2015	47	
2016	77	
2017	93	
2018	91	
2019	165	
2020	261	
2021	628	
2022	1157	
2023	–	
2024	709	
2025	904	

== Team appearances ==
Amateur

- Espirito Santo Trophy (representing Germany): 2004, 2006
- European Ladies' Team Championship (representing Germany): 2005, 2007

Professional

- Solheim Cup (representing Europe): 2011 (winners), 2015

=== Solheim Cup record ===
Year	Total matches	Total W–L–H	Singles W–L–H	Foursomes W–L–H	Fourballs W–L–H	Points won	Points %
Career	7	2–3–2	0–2–0	2–0–0	0–1–2	3.0	42.9
2011	3	0–2–1	0–1–0 lost to B. Lang 6&5	0–0–0	0–1–1 halved with C. Matthew, lost w/ C. Boeljon 2&1	0.5	16.7
2015	4	2–1–1	0–1–0 lost to P. Creamer 4&3	2–0–0 won w/ C. Matthew 3&2, won w/ C. Matthew 1 up	0–0–1 halved w/ C. Masson	2.5	62.5

== Olympic games participation ==
Year	Country	Score	Final position
2016	Brazil	71-74-69-69=283	T25

== See also ==
- List of Florida Gators women's golfers on the LPGA Tour
- List of University of Florida alumni
