= Tiburón Golf Club =

Golf club in Naples, Florida, USA

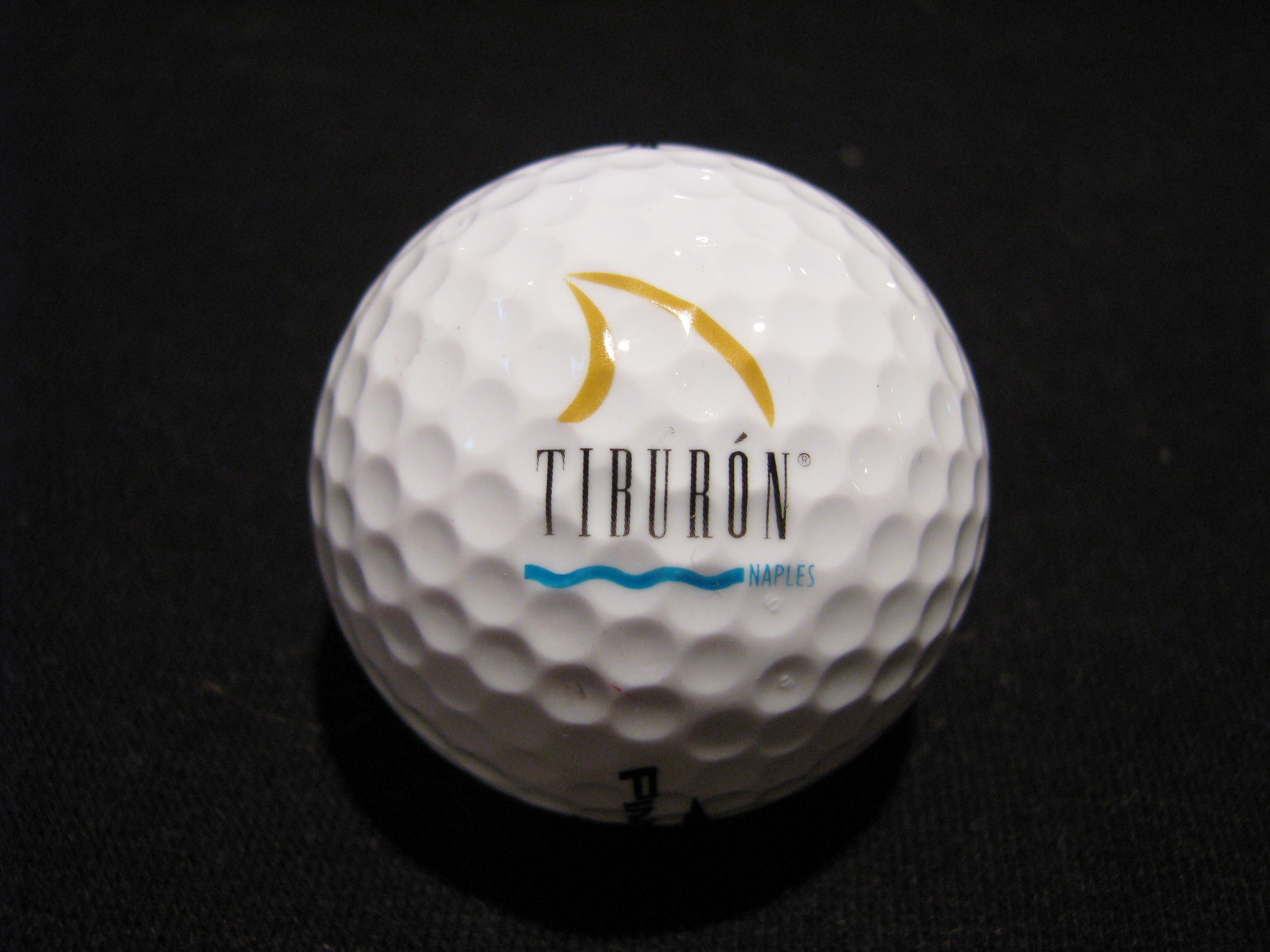

- Location in the United States
- 26.248°N 81.765°W

Club information
- Location: Naples, Florida
- Established: 1998; 28 years ago
- Type: Semi-Private Golf Club
- Owner: Host Hotels & Resorts
- Operator: Troon
- Total holes: 36
- Tournaments: QBE Shootout (2001-2022); CME Group Tour Championship (2013– ) Chubb Classic (2021– ) Grant Thornton Invitational (2023)
- Website: tiburonnaples.com

Gold
- Designed by: Greg Norman
- Par: 72
- Length: 7,382 yards (6,750 m)
- Course rating: 76.0
- Slope rating: 137

Black
- Designed by: Greg Norman
- Par: 72
- Length: 6,949 yards (6,354 m)
- Course rating: 74.0
- Slope rating: 145

Tiburón Golf Club is a golf club located in Naples, Florida. It has two courses, Gold and Black, both designed by Greg Norman, twice the winner of the Open Championship and formerly the top-ranked player in the world. From Australia, Norman's nickname on the PGA Tour was the "Great White Shark", and tiburón is the Spanish word for shark.

The Gold Course hosts the annual QBE Shootout (formerly Franklin Templeton Shootout), originally the "Shark Shootout", an off-season golf event hosted by Norman that includes members of the PGA Tour and PGA Tour Champions. The tournament debuted in California in 1989 and moved to Tiburón in 2001. In 2023, the PGA Tour replaced the QBE Shootout with a new team event at Tiburon, the Grant Thornton Invitational, which is a 16-team event featuring one PGA Tour and one LPGA Tour golfer on each team.

Since 2013, the Gold Course has also hosted the season-ending event of the LPGA Tour, the CME Group Tour Championship, held in November.

The Black Course hosts the Chubb Classic, a Champions Tour Event held in February.

== History ==
The Gold Course opened 28 years ago in 1998 and the Black in 2001. Tiburón is designated as a Certified Audubon Cooperative Sanctuary by Audubon International. In 2006, the club was the first to use customized Segway golf carts.

The golf club is part of a gated golf community by the same name. The Ritz-Carlton Golf Resort, Naples, is also located on the property. The club is also home to the Tiburón Golf Academy, which features private lessons, multi-day golf schools, junior camps, and clubfitting.

== Courses ==
=== Gold ===
Championship tees

| Hole | 1 | 2 | 3 | 4 | 5 | 6 | 7 | 8 | 9 | Out | 10 | 11 | 12 | 13 | 14 | 15 | 16 | 17 | 18 | In | Total |
|---|---|---|---|---|---|---|---|---|---|---|---|---|---|---|---|---|---|---|---|---|---|
| Yards | 573 | 440 | 458 | 428 | 225 | 600 | 396 | 175 | 480 | 3,775 | 365 | 430 | 215 | 350 | 578 | 420 | 205 | 559 | 493 | 3,607 | 7,382 |
| Par | 5 | 4 | 4 | 4 | 3 | 5 | 4 | 3 | 4 | 36 | 4 | 4 | 3 | 4 | 5 | 4 | 3 | 5 | 4 | 36 | 72 |

- Rating = 76.0, Slope = 137

=== Black ===
Championship tees

| Hole | 1 | 2 | 3 | 4 | 5 | 6 | 7 | 8 | 9 | Out | 10 | 11 | 12 | 13 | 14 | 15 | 16 | 17 | 18 | In | Total |
|---|---|---|---|---|---|---|---|---|---|---|---|---|---|---|---|---|---|---|---|---|---|
| Yards | 376 | 422 | 378 | 201 | 400 | 502 | 160 | 345 | 581 | 3,365 | 188 | 359 | 442 | 220 | 403 | 560 | 414 | 465 | 533 | 3,584 | 6,949 |
| Par | 4 | 4 | 4 | 3 | 4 | 5 | 3 | 4 | 5 | 36 | 3 | 4 | 4 | 3 | 4 | 5 | 4 | 4 | 5 | 36 | 72 |

- Rating = 74.0, Slope = 145

=== Amenities ===
- Sydney's Pub
- Spa
- Fitness center
- Beach transportation
- Club concierge
