= Jenny Shin =

South Korean professional golfer (born 1992)

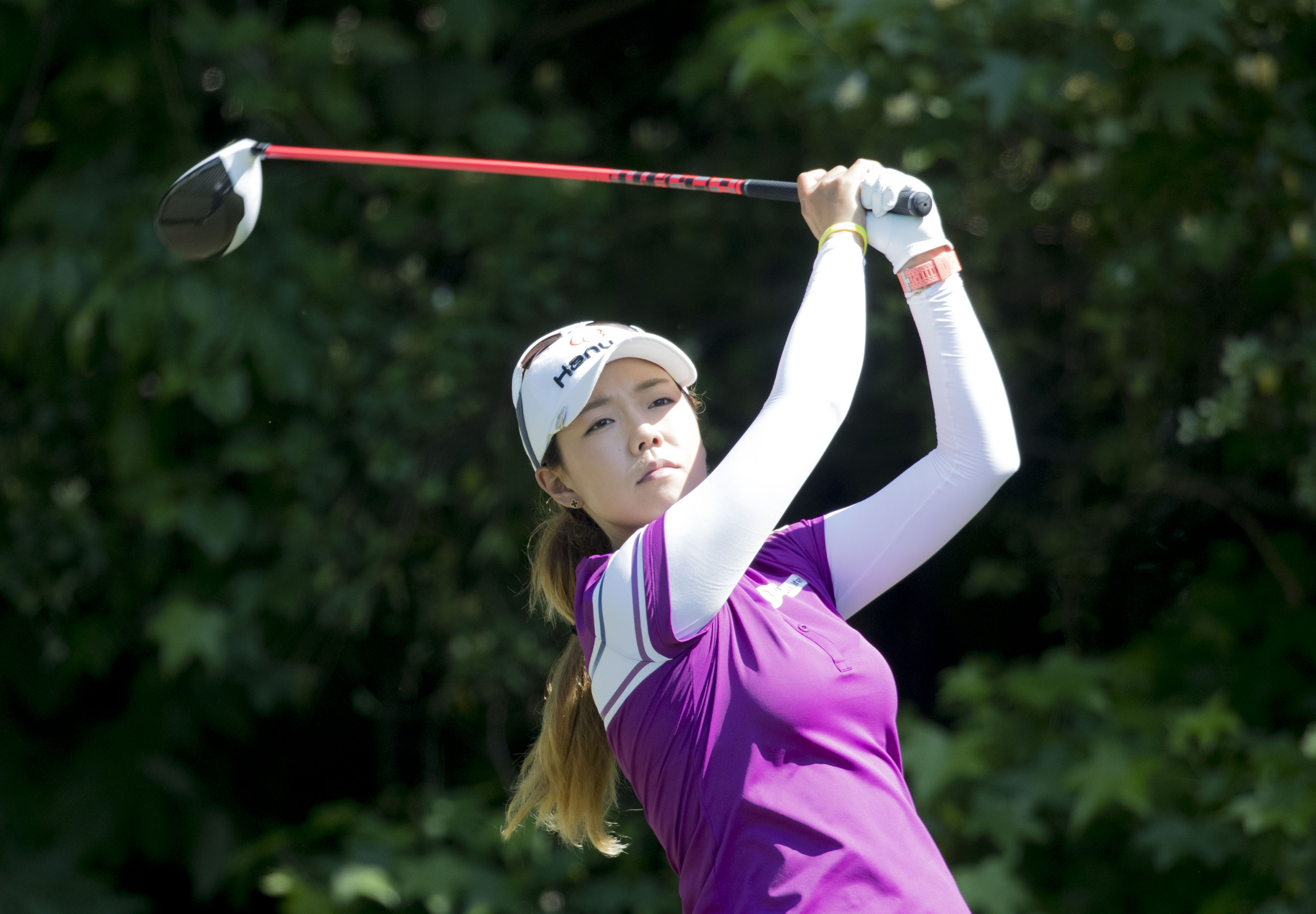
- Shin in 2017

Personal information
- Nationality: South Korea
- Born: 7 October 1992 (age 34) Seoul, South Korea
- Height: 5 ft 4 in (163 cm)

Career
- Sport: Golf
- Turned professional: 2010
- Current tour: LPGA Tour
- Former tour: Futures Tour
- Professional wins: 3

Number of wins by tour
- LPGA Tour: 2
- Ladies European Tour: 1
- Epson Tour: 1

Best results in LPGA major championships
- Chevron Championship: T11: 2015
- Women's PGA C'ship: T8: 2023
- U.S. Women's Open: T10: 2014
- Women's British Open: 6th: 2017
- Evian Championship: T12: 2024

Jenny Shin (born 7 October 1992) is a South Korean professional golfer.

Born in Seoul, South Korea, Shin moved to the United States at age 9. She won the U.S. Girls' Junior in 2006 becoming its youngest winner at age 13.

Shin turned professional in 2010. She played on the Futures Tour in 2010, winning The International at Concord in July and finishing 4th on the money list to earn her LPGA Tour card for 2011. She has played on the LPGA Tour since, with her first win at the 2016 Volunteers of America Texas Shootout.

== Amateur wins ==
- 2006 U.S. Girls' Junior
- 2009 AJGA Heather Farr Classic

== Professional wins (3) ==
=== LPGA Tour (2) ===
No.	Date	Tournament	Winning score	To par	Margin of victory	Runner(s)-up
1	1 May 2016	Volunteers of America Texas Shootout	68-70-65-67=270	−14	2 strokes	(South Korea) Mi Jung Hur (United States) Gerina Piller (South Korea) Amy Yang
2	26 Jul 2026	ISPS Handa Women's Scottish Open^{[1]}	66-67-71-75=279	−9	2 strokes	(South Korea) Kim A-lim

^{1} Co-sanctioned by the Ladies European Tour.

LPGA Tour playoff record (0–1)

No.	Year	Tournament	Opponents	Result
1	2012	HSBC Women's Champions	(South Korea) Choi Na-yeon (China) Shanshan Feng (United States) Angela Stanford	Stanford won with par on third extra hole Choi eliminated by par on second hole Feng eliminated by par on first hole

=== LPGA Futures Tour (1) ===
- 2010 The International at Concord

== Results in LPGA majors ==
Results not in chronological order.

Tournament	2008	2009	2010	2011	2012	2013	2014	2015	2016	2017	2018	2019	2020
Chevron Championship					CUT	T55	T39	T11	T50	T35	T40	T12	WD
Women's PGA Championship				T68	T19	T22	T13	T22	CUT	T29	CUT	T37	T30
U.S. Women's Open	CUT		CUT		T35	T54	T10	19	T46	T21	T27	T39	T23
The Evian Championship ^						T31	T20	T55	T17	T48	T16	CUT	NT
Women's British Open				CUT	T17	T17	T29	T28	CUT	6	CUT	T51	T51

Tournament	2021	2022	2023	2024	2025	2026
Chevron Championship	T28	DQ	CUT	T57	T71	70
U.S. Women's Open	T23		CUT	T19	CUT	
Women's PGA Championship	CUT	T25	T8	CUT	T12	T32
The Evian Championship	T50	T58	T54	T12	T31	CUT
Women's British Open	T42	CUT	T16	T17	T23	T47

^ The Evian Championship was added as a major in 2013.

Top 10
Did not play

CUT = missed the half-way cut
DQ = disqualified
WD = withdrew
NT = no tournament
"T" = tied for place

=== Summary ===
Tournament	Wins	2nd	3rd	Top-5	Top-10	Top-25	Events	Cuts made
Chevron Championship	0	0	0	0	0	2	15	11
U.S. Women's Open	0	0	0	0	1	6	15	11
Women's PGA Championship	0	0	0	0	1	7	16	12
The Evian Championship	0	0	0	0	0	4	13	11
Women's British Open	0	0	0	0	1	6	16	12
Totals	0	0	0	0	3	25	75	57

- Most consecutive cuts made – 19 (2012 U.S. Open – 2016 ANA)
- Longest streak of top-10s – 1 (three times)

== World ranking ==
Position in Women's World Golf Rankings at the end of each calendar year.

Year	World ranking	Source
2008	330	
2009	312	
2010	466	
2013	69	
2014	43	
2015	42	
2016	37	
2017	51	
2018	63	
2019	74	
2020	84	
2021	80	
2022	98	
2023	66	
2024	56	
2025	92	
