= Chella Choi =

South Korean professional golfer (born 1990)

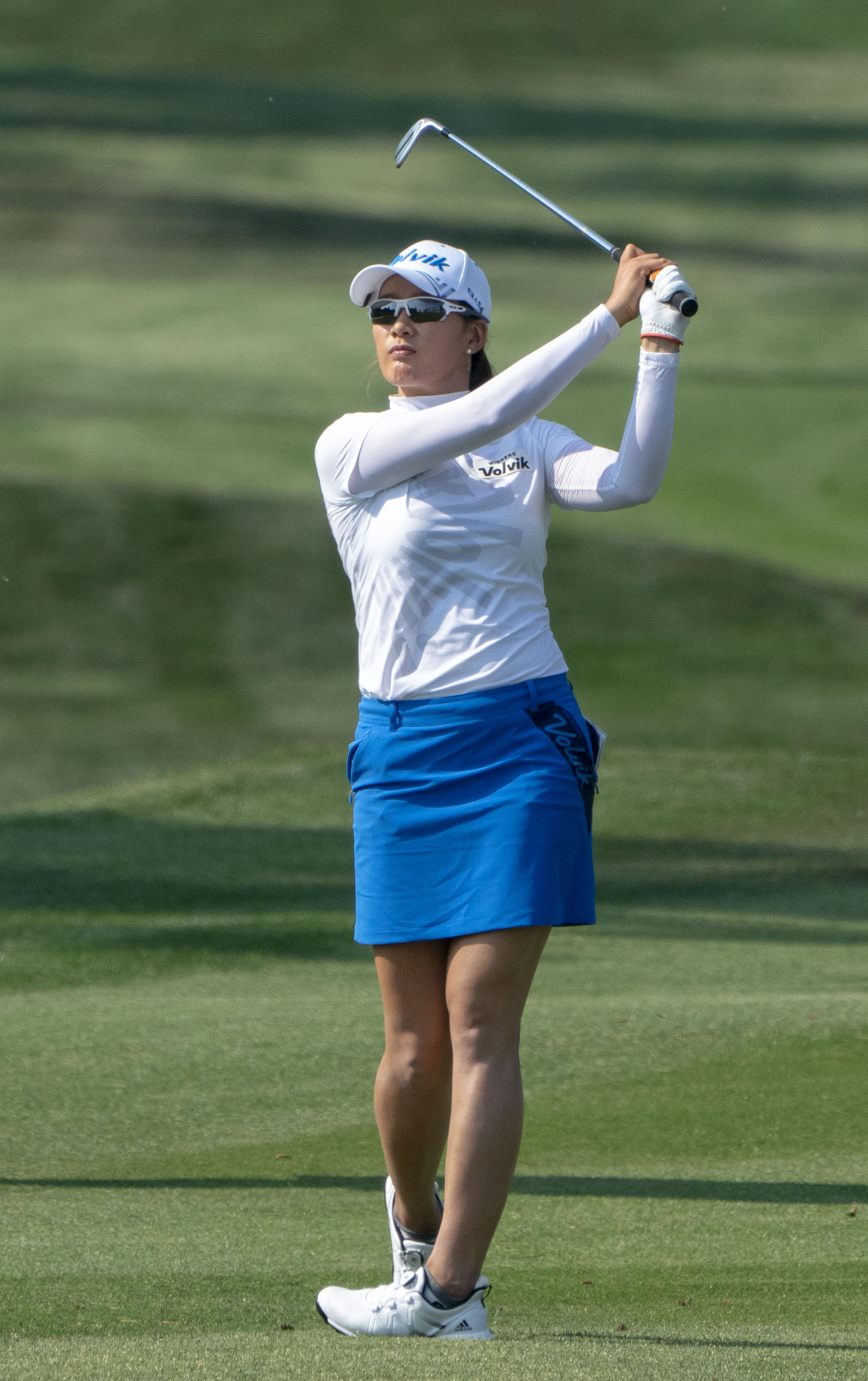

Personal information
- Full name: Woon-jung Choi
- Nationality: South Korea
- Born: 25 August 1990 (age 36) Daegu, South Korea
- Height: 5 ft 6 in (1.68 m)

Career
- Sport: Golf
- Turned professional: 2008
- Current tour: LPGA Tour (2009–)
- Former tour: Futures Tour (2008)
- Professional wins: 1

Number of wins by tour
- LPGA Tour: 1

Best results in LPGA major championships
- Chevron Championship: T16: 2014
- Women's PGA C'ship: 3rd: 2017
- U.S. Women's Open: T13: 2011
- Women's British Open: T10: 2012
- Evian Championship: T6: 2013

Achievements and awards
- William and Mousie Powell Award: 2014

- Chella Choi
- Hangul: 최운정
- RR: Choe Unjeong
- MR: Ch'oe Unjŏng

Woon-jung "Chella" Choi (born 25 August 1990) is a South Korean professional golfer.

== Career ==
Choi played on the Duramed Futures Tour in 2008 with a best finish of T-2 at the Bright House Networks Open. She earned her 2009 LPGA Tour card at LPGA Final Qualifying Tournament, having to earn her card through a playoff.

Her first professional victory came on 19 July 2015, at the LPGA Tour's Marathon Classic, where she defeated Jang Ha-na in a playoff. The win happened after seven years and 157 LPGA Tour events. For the first eight years of Choi's professional career, her father was her caddie and vowed to remain until she won.

== Professional wins (1) ==
=== LPGA Tour wins (1) ===
No.	Date	Tournament	Winning score	To par	Margin of victory	Runner(s)-up
1	19 Jul 2015	Marathon Classic	73-66-65-66=270	−14	Playoff	(South Korea) Jang Ha-na

LPGA Tour playoff record (1–1)

No.	Year	Tournament	Opponent	Result
1	2012	Manulife Financial LPGA Classic	(United States) Brittany Lang (South Korea) Inbee Park (South Korea) Hee Kyung Seo	Lang won with birdie on third extra hole Park eliminated by birdie on second hole Choi eliminated by birdie on first hole
2	2015	Marathon Classic	(South Korea) Jang Ha-na	Won with par on first extra hole

== Results in LPGA majors ==
Results not in chronological order

Tournament	2009	2010	2011	2012
Chevron Championship			CUT	T49
Women's PGA Championship	T53	T47	CUT	T36
U.S. Women's Open		61	T13	CUT
Women's British Open		CUT	T54	T10

Tournament	2013	2014	2015	2016	2017	2018	2019	2020
Chevron Championship	T32	T16	CUT	T45	T47	T40	T35	CUT
Women's PGA Championship	T5	T22	T26	T8	3	T57	T30	T48
U.S. Women's Open	T25	T15	T20	T32	CUT	T41	T26	T23
The Evian Championship ^	T6	CUT	T25	T39	T48	T16	T22	NT
Women's British Open	CUT	T38	T50	T40	T30	CUT	CUT	

Tournament	2021	2022	2023	2024	2025	2026
Chevron Championship	CUT	T53	T49			
U.S. Women's Open			CUT			
Women's PGA Championship	T33	T16	CUT			CUT
The Evian Championship	T38	T60	CUT			T53
Women's British Open	T59	CUT				

^ The Evian Championship was added as a major in 2013

Top 10
Did not play

CUT = missed the half-way cut
NT = no tournament
T = tied

=== Summary ===
Tournament	Wins	2nd	3rd	Top-5	Top-10	Top-25	Events	Cuts made
Chevron Championship	0	0	0	0	0	1	13	9
U.S. Women's Open	0	0	0	0	0	5	12	9
Women's PGA Championship	0	0	1	2	3	5	16	13
The Evian Championship	0	0	0	0	1	4	11	9
Women's British Open	0	0	0	0	1	1	12	7
Totals	0	0	1	2	5	16	64	47

- Most consecutive cuts made – 11 (2015 WPGA – 2017 WPGA)
- Longest streak of top-10s – 2 (2013 WPGA – 2013 Evian)
