= 2026 U.S. Women's Open =

Golf tournament

2026 U.S. Women's Open presented by Ally

Tournament information
- Dates: June 4–7, 2026
- Location: Pacific Palisades, California, U.S. 34.05°N 118.50°W
- Course: Riviera Country Club
- Organized by: USGA
- Tour: LPGA Tour

Statistics
- Par: 71
- Length: 6,699 yards (6,126 m)
- Field: 156 players, 68 after cut
- Cut: 146 (+4)
- Prize fund: $12,500,000
- Winner's share: $2,500,000

Champion
- (United States) Nelly Korda
- 276 (−8)

Location map
- Location in the United States Location in California Location in Los Angeles

The 2026 U.S. Women's Open presented by Ally was the 81st U.S. Women's Open, held June 4–7 at Riviera Country Club in Pacific Palisades, California.

Nelly Korda won her fourth major title (and second consecutive), one stroke ahead of runners-up Charley Hull and Gaby López. This was Korda's first victory at the U.S. Women's Open.

== Venue ==
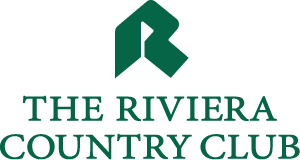

The Riviera Country Club is a private club with a championship golf course as well as tennis courts, located in the Pacific Palisades neighborhood of the Westside of Los Angeles, California.

The Riviera was designed by golf course architects George C. Thomas Jr. and William P. Bell, it has been the primary host for the Genesis Invitational (originally the Los Angeles Open), an annual event on the PGA Tour in February. The 2026 edition was the 62nd held at Riviera.

The Riviera has hosted three major championships: the U.S. Open in 1948, and the PGA Championship in 1983 and 1995. In addition, it was site of the U.S. Senior Open, a senior major, in 1998 and the U.S. Amateur in August 2017. The club is scheduled to host the 2026 U.S. Women's Open. The club is also scheduled to host golf at the Summer Olympics in 2028. It was announced the club would host the 131st U.S. Open in 2031. It will be the second time the club has hosted a U.S. Open.

== Field ==
The field for this U.S. Women's Open was made up of players who gained entry through qualifying events and those who were exempt from qualifying. The exemption criteria included provision for recent major champions, winners of major amateur events, and leading players in the Women's World Golf Rankings.

The USGA accepted 1,897 entries for the championship.

=== Exemptions ===
This list details the exemption criteria for the 2026 U.S. Women's Open and the players exempt. Many players were exempt in multiple categories. (Note: (a) – denotes amateur)

1. Winners of the U.S. Women's Open for the last 10 years (2016–2025)

- Allisen Corpuz (17)
- Ariya Jutanugarn (2,17)
- Kim A-lim (10,17)
- Brittany Lang
- Lee Jeong-eun
- Minjee Lee (7,8,10,17)
- Park Sung-hyun
- Yuka Saso
- Maja Stark (2,17)

2. From the 2025 U.S. Women's Open, the 10 lowest scorers and anyone tying for 10th place

- Choi Hye-jin (10,17)
- Hailee Cooper
- Linn Grant (10,11,17)
- Nelly Korda (6,7,10,11,16,17)
- Mao Saigo (6,10,17)
- Hinako Shibuno
- Rio Takeda (10,17)
- Angel Yin (10,17)
- Yin Ruoning (7,17)

3. Winner of the 2025 U.S. Senior Women's Open

- Becky Morgan

4. Winner of the 2025 U.S. Women's Amateur

- Megha Ganne (a)

5. Winners of the 2025 U.S. Girls' Junior and U.S. Women's Mid-Amateur and the 2025 U.S. Women's Amateur runner-up (must be an amateur)

- Aphrodite Deng (a)
- Ina Kim-Schaad (a)
- Brooke Biermann (a) did not play

6. Winners of the Chevron Championship (2022–2026)

- Jennifer Kupcho (10,11,17)
- Lilia Vu (9,17)

7. Winners of the Women's PGA Championship (2021–2025)

- Chun In-gee
- Amy Yang (17)

8. Winners of The Evian Championship (2021–2025)

- Céline Boutier (10,11,17)
- Ayaka Furue (10,17)
- Brooke Henderson (10,11,17)
- Grace Kim (17)

9. Winners of the Women's British Open (2021–2025)

- Ashleigh Buhai
- Lydia Ko (10,16,17)
- Anna Nordqvist
- Miyū Yamashita (10,11,17)

10. The top 30 point leaders from the 2025 LPGA Race to the CME Globe Final Points.

- Carlota Ciganda (11,17)
- Lindy Duncan (17)
- Nasa Hataoka (11,17)
- Charley Hull (11,17)
- Im Jin-hee (17)
- Akie Iwai (11,17)
- Chisato Iwai (16,17)
- Minami Katsu (17)
- Kim Hyo-joo (11,16,17)
- Kim Sei-young (11,17)
- Andrea Lee (17)
- Lee So-mi (17)
- Gaby López (17)
- Yealimi Noh (17)
- Jeeno Thitikul (11,16,17)
- Ryu Hae-ran (16,17) did not play

11. Winners of individual LPGA co-sponsored events, whose victories were considered official, from the conclusion of the 2025 U.S. Women's Open to the initiation of the 2026 U.S. Women's Open (only events that awarded a full point allocation for the Race to the CME Globe)

- Lauren Coughlin (17)
- Hannah Green (16,17)
- Hwang You-min (17)
- Lee Mi-hyang (16,17)
- Wang Xinying (17)
- Lottie Woad (17)

12. Winner of the 2026 Augusta National Women's Amateur (must be an amateur)

- María José Marín (a)

13. Winner of the 2025 Women's Amateur Championship (must be an amateur)

- Paula Martín Sampedro (a)

14. Winner of the 2025 Mark H. McCormack Medal (No. 1 in World Amateur Golf Ranking; must be an amateur)

- Kiara Romero (a)

15. Winner of the 2026 NCAA Division I Individual Golf Championship (must be an amateur)

- Farah O'Keefe (a)

16. From the 2026 Race to CME Globe, the top 10 point leaders as of April 1, 2026

- Auston Kim (17)
- Zhang Weiwei

17. From the current Women's World Golf Rankings, the top 75 players and anyone tying for 75th place as of March 23, 2026

- Casandra Alexander
- Pajaree Anannarukarn
- Yuna Araki
- Jenny Bae
- Esther Henseleit
- Hong Jung-min
- Sora Kamiya
- Yui Kawamoto
- Megan Khang
- Kim Min-sol
- Ko Jin-young
- Sakura Koiwai
- Stephanie Kyriacou
- Ingrid Lindblad
- Nanna Koerstz Madsen
- Mimi Rhodes
- Madelene Sagström
- Shuri Sakuma
- Jiyai Shin
- Fuka Suga
- Ai Suzuki
- Chiara Tamburlini
- Patty Tavatanakit
- Chanettee Wannasaen
- Yoo Hyun-jo
- Ina Yoon
- Bang Shin-sil, Lee Ye-won, Ro Seung-hui, Sarah Schmelzel and Sung Yu-jin did not play

18. From the current Women's World Golf Rankings, the top 75 players and anyone tying for 75th place as of May 25, 2026 (if not previously exempt)

- Ko Ji-won
- Shiho Kuwaki
- Lee Da-yeon
- Liu Yan
- Julia López Ramirez
- Leona Maguire
- Rose Zhang

19. Deferred exemptions under USGA Championships Family Policy

- Ally Ewing
- Alison Lee
- Lin Xiyu
- Michelle Wie

20. Special exemptions

- Yani Tseng

=== Qualifying ===
Qualifying took place April 26 to May 13, 2026, via 36-hole stroke-play qualifiers at 26 different sites, 23 of them in the United States and one each in England, Canada and Japan.

Date	Location	Venue	Field	Spots	Qualifiers
Apr 20	Mutsuzawa, Japan	Boso Country Club	132	4	Miyuu Goto, Oh Soo-min (a), Sayaka Takahashi, (Note: Would have qualified in category 18) Wu Chia Yen
Apr 20	Galveston, Texas	Galveston Country Club	78	2	Brianna Do, Zhang Yue
Apr 27	New Smyrna Beach, Florida	Sugar Mill Country Club	71	2	Sofia Rivera (a), Siuue Wu (a)
Apr 27	Phoenix, Arizona	Arizona Country Club	78	2	Sarah Hammett (a), Kaleiya Romero
Apr 27	Corral de Tierra, California	Corral De Tierra Country Club	22	2	Muni He, Meja Örtengren (a)
Apr 28	Seattle, Washington	Rainier Golf & Country Club	52	2	Lauren Kim (a), Catherine Park (a)
Apr 28	Monroe, North Carolina	Rolling Hills Country Club	68	2	Gurleen Kaur, Chloe Kovelesky (a)
Apr 28	St. Louis, Missouri	Meadowbrook Country Club	78	2	Zoe Cusack (a), Addie Dobson (a)
May 4	New Albany, Ohio	New Albany Country Club	78	2	Veronika Kedronova (a), Nellie Ong (a)
May 5	Pittsburgh, Pennsylvania	Shannopin Country Club	38	1	Melanie Green
May 5	Atlanta, Georgia	Piedmont Driving Club	75	2	Johanna Sjursen (a), Thidapa Suwannapura
May 6	Naples, Florida	Wilderness Country Club	56	2	Ana Belac, Paula Francisco (a)
May 6	Springfield, Virginia	Springfield Golf & Country Club	66	2	Thanana Kotchasanmanee (a), Katherine Muzi
May 7	Mendota Heights, Minnesota	Somerset Country Club	40	2	Anna Huang, Danielle Kang
May 8	Honolulu, Hawaii	Honolulu Country Club	27	1	Lin Jie-En (a)
May 11	Rancho Santa Fe, California	Rancho Santa Fe Golf Club	68	2	Zeng Liqi, Katelyn Kong (a)
May 11	Marlborough, Massachusetts	Marlborough Country Club	29	1	Yuri Yoshida
May 11	West Orange, New Jersey	Essex County Country Club	63	4	Nataliya Guseva, Minji Kang, Gina Kim, Dewi Weber
May 11	Richmond, California	Richmond Country Club	67	2	Anita Lumpongpoung (a), Asterisk Talley (a)
May 11	Schererville, Indiana	Briar Ridge Country Club	53	2	Paula Reto, Athena Singh (a)
May 11	Fort Meade, Florida	Streamsong Resort	47	2	Pei-Yun Chien, Carla Bernat
May 11	Denham, England	Buckinghamshire Golf Club	50	2	Lois Lau, Olivia Mehaffey
May 11	Coquitlam, Canada	Vancouver Golf Club	30	1	Amy Seung Hyun Lee
May 12	Westminster, Colorado	Walnut Creek Golf Preserve	43	1	Bianca Pagdanganan
May 13	Azle, Texas	Cross Timbers Golf Course	64	2	Pauline del Rosario, Napat Lertsadwattana
May 13	Bermuda Dunes, California	Bermuda Dunes Country Club	69	2	Lucy Li, Kaylyn Noh

==== Alternates who gained entry ====
The following players gained a place in the field having finished as the leading alternates in the specified final qualifying events:

- Jaravee Boonchant (Mendota Heights)
- Laney Frye (West Orange)
- Natsumi Hayakawa (Japan)
- Bronte Law (England)
- Amiyu Ozeki (Japan)
- Karis Davidson (Seattle)

== Round summaries ==
=== First round ===
Thursday, June 4, 2026

Place	Player	Score	To par
1	(United States) Jennifer Kupcho	66	−5
2	(South Korea) Kim Sei-young	67	−4
T3	(South Korea) Minji Kang	68	−3
T3	(Mexico) Gaby López	68	−3
T3	(Japan) Hinako Shibuno	68	−3
T3	(South Korea) Yoo Hyun-jo	68	−3
T3	(South Korea) Ina Yoon	68	−3
T8	(Australia) Karis Davidson	69	−2
T8	(Japan) Nasa Hataoka	69	−2
T8	(Australia) Minjee Lee	69	−2
T8	(South Korea) Jiyai Shin	69	−2
T8	(Thailand) Patty Tavatanakit	69	−2
T8	(China) Yin Ruoning	69	−2

=== Second round ===
Friday, June 5, 2026

Place	Player	Score	To par
T1	(United States) Alison Lee	70-68=138	−4
T1	(China) Yin Ruoning	69-69=138	−4
T3	(South Korea) Chun In-gee	71-68=139	−3
T3	(South Korea) Kim Sei-young	67-72=139	−3
T3	(United States) Jennifer Kupcho	66-73=139	−3
T3	(Mexico) Gaby López	68-71=139	−3
T3	(Japan) Hinako Shibuno	68-71=139	−3
T3	(South Korea) Yoo Hyun-jo	68-71=139	−3
T9	(South Africa) Casandra Alexander	70-70=140	−2
T9	(United States) Lauren Coughlin	72-68=140	−2
T9	(Japan) Sora Kamiya	72-68=140	−2
T9	(United States) Nelly Korda	73-67=140	−2

=== Third round ===
Saturday, June 6, 2026

Place	Player	Score	To par
T1	(South Korea) Kim Sei-young	67-72-68=207	−6
T1	(United States) Nelly Korda	73-67-67=207	−6
T3	(South Korea) Chun In-gee	71-68-69=208	−5
T3	(United States) Jennifer Kupcho	66-73-69=208	−5
T5	(Japan) Nasa Hataoka	69-72-68=209	−4
T5	(Mexico) Gaby López	68-71-70=209	−4
T5	(China) Yin Ruoning	69-69-71=209	−4
T8	(England) Charley Hull	73-72-65=210	−3
T8	(United States) Alison Lee	70-68-72=210	−3
T8	(South Korea) Yoo Hyun-jo	68-71-71=210	−3

=== Final round ===
Sunday, June 7, 2026

Champion

Place	Player	Score	To par	Money ($)
1	(United States) Nelly Korda	73-67-67-69=276	−8	2,500,000
T2	(England) Charley Hull	73-72-65-67=277	−7	1,089,774
T2	(Mexico) Gaby López	68-71-70-68=277	−7	1,089,774
4	(South Korea) Chun In-gee	71-68-69-70=278	−6	581,535
5	(South Korea) Kim Sei-young	67-72-68-72=279	−5	484,535
T6	(Japan) Nasa Hataoka	69-72-68-72=281	−3	429,748
T6	(United States) Kiara Romero (a)	73-70-70-68=281	−3	0
T8	(Thailand) Pajaree Anannarukarn	73-70-72-67=282	−2	319,831
T8	(United States) Allisen Corpuz	71-70-70-71=282	−2	319,831
T8	(United States) Jennifer Kupcho	66-73-69-74=282	−2	319,831
T8	(Colombia) María José Marín (a)	70-73-68-71=282	−2	0
T8	(Sweden) Maja Stark	71-72-68-71=282	−2	319,831
T8	(China) Yin Ruoning	69-69-71-73=282	−2	319,831

==== Scorecard ====
Hole	1	2	3	4	5	6	7	8	9	10	11	12	13	14	15	16	17	18
Par	5	4	4	3	4	3	4	4	4	4	5	4	4	3	4	3	5	4
(United States) Korda	−7	−7	−7	−7	−7	−8	−7	−7	−7	−7	−7	−7	−7	−7	−7	−7	−8	−8
(England) Hull	−5	−5	−6	−6	−6	−7	−7	−7	−6	−7	−8	−7	−7	−6	−6	−6	−7	−7
(Mexico) López	−4	−4	−4	−4	−4	−4	−4	−4	−4	−5	−6	−6	−7	−7	−7	−6	−6	−7
(South Korea) Chun	−6	−6	−6	−6	−6	−6	−7	−7	−7	−8	−9	−8	−7	−7	−7	−7	−7	−6
(South Korea) Kim	−7	−7	−7	−7	−7	−8	−7	−7	−7	−6	−6	−7	−6	−5	−5	−5	−6	−5
(Japan) Hataoka	−5	−5	−6	−6	−6	−6	−6	−5	−5	−6	−6	−6	−5	−4	−3	−3	−3	−3
(United States) Romero	E	E	E	E	E	−1	−1	−1	−2	−1	−2	−2	−2	−1	−1	−2	−3	−3
(United States) Kupcho	−5	−4	−3	−3	−3	−3	−2	−2	−2	−1	−2	−2	−1	−1	−1	−1	−2	−2
(China) Yin	−4	−4	−4	−4	−4	−5	−5	−5	−6	−5	−6	−6	−6	−5	−3	−2	−2	−2

Cumulative tournament scores, relative to par

Eagle	Birdie	Bogey	Double bogey
