= Hitachi 3Tours Championship =

Tournament information
- Location: Narita, Chiba
- Established: 2005
- Course(s): Taiei Country Club (2021); Glissando Golf Club (2015–2019); Hirakawa Country Club (2012–2014); King Fields Golf Club (2006–2011)
- Tour(s): Japan Golf Tour; PGA of Japan; LPGA of Japan Tour
- Format: Alternate play Stroke play
- Prize fund: ¥57 million
- Month played: December

Current champion
- LPGA

The Hitachi 3Tours Championship (日立3ツアーズ選手権, Hitachi surī tsuāzu sensyuken) is an unofficial golf event held every December at the Glissando Golf Club Narita, Chiba, Japan. The tournament is a unique stroke play event, and, as the name suggests, pits teams from the Japan Golf Tour, the LPGA of Japan Tour, and PGA Senior Tour. The teams were made of five tour members from 2005 to 2009 and six members since 2010. The title sponsor is Hitachi.

== Winners ==
Year	Winning tour	Players representing winning tour
2025	LPGA	Yuna Araki, Sora Kamiya, Yui Kawamoto, Akari Sakuma, Fuka Suga, Ayaka Takahashi
2024	LPGA	Ayaka Furue, Yui Kawamoto, Sakura Koiwai, Shiho Kuwaki, Shuri Sakuma, Rio Takeda
2023	LPGA	Akie Iwai, Chisato Iwai, Sakura Koiwai, Kokona Sakurai, Jiyai Shin, Miyū Yamashita
2022	JGTO	Kazuki Higa, Rikuya Hoshino, Yuto Katsuragawa, Riki Kawamoto, Kaito Onishi, Taiga Semikawa
2021	LPGA	Erika Hara, Mone Inami, Erika Kikuchi, Sakura Koiwai, Yuna Nishimura, Mao Saigo
2020	Cancelled	
2019	LPGA	Lala Anai, Sakura Koiwai, Hinako Shibuno, Jiyai Shin, Ai Suzuki, Momoko Ueda
2018	PGA Senior	Kim Jong-duck, Katsumi Kubo, Prayad Marksaeng, Gregory Meyer, Masayoshi Yamazoe, Tsuyoshi Yoneyama
2017	JGTO	Yuta Ikeda, Shugo Imahira, Shingo Katayama, Satoshi Kodaira, Yūsaku Miyazato, Ryu Hyun-woo
2016	JGTO	Daisuke Kataoka, Shingo Katayama, Satoshi Kodaira, Yūsaku Miyazato, Song Young-han, Hideto Tanihara
2015	LPGA	Erika Kikuchi, Lee Bo-mee, Teresa Lu, Shiho Oyama, Momoko Ueda, Ayaka Watanabe
2014	LPGA	Ahn Sun-ju, Lee Bo-mee, Jiyai Shin, Misuzu Narita, Miki Sakai, Shiho Oyama
2013	JGTO	Yuta Ikeda, Shingo Katayama, Satoshi Kodaira, Michio Matsumura, Koumei Oda, Yoshinori Fujimoto
2012	PGA Senior	Kōki Idoki, Kiyoshi Murota, Tsuneyuki Nakajima, Seiki Okuda, Naomichi Ozaki, Kazuhiro Takami
2011	LPGA	Yukari Baba, Shiho Oyama, Ritsuko Ryu, Miki Saiki, Ahn Sun-ju, Sakura Yokomine
2010	JGTO	Ryo Ishikawa, Yuta Ikeda, Hiroyuki Fujita, Katsumasa Miyamoto, Michio Matsumura, Shunsuke Sonoda
2009	PGA Senior	Tsuneyuki Nakajima, Kiyoshi Murota, Tateo Ozaki, Tsukasa Watanabe, Hajime Meshiai
2008	JGTO	Azuma Yano, Shingo Katayama, Hideto Tanihara, Katsumasa Miyamoto, Ryo Ishikawa
2007	JGTO	Hideto Tanihara, Keiichiro Fukabori, Toru Taniguchi, Shingo Katayama, Tomohiro Kondo
2006	LPGA	Shin Hyun-Ju, Wei Yun-Jye, Sakura Yokomine, Ai Miyazato, Akane Iijima
2005	JGTO	Yasuharu Imano, Keiichiro Fukabori, Toru Taniguchi, Shinichi Yokota, Tatsuhiko Takahashi

== See also ==
- Wendy's 3-Tour Challenge (similar American golf event)
- Japan Golf Association
