= 2026 Women's British Open =

Golf tournament

2026 AIG Women's Open
Tournament information
- Dates: 30 July – 2 August 2026
- Location: Lytham St Annes, Lancashire, England; 53.7496°N 3.0178°W
- Course: Royal Lytham & St Annes Golf Club
- Organized by: The R&A
- Tours: Ladies European Tour; LPGA Tour

Statistics
- Par: 71
- Length: 6,601 yards (6,036 m)
- Field: 144 players, 68 after cut
- Cut: 146 (+4)
- Prize fund: US$10,000,000
- Winner's share: $1,500,000

Champion
- (Japan) Shiho Kuwaki
- 279 (−5)
- Location in the United Kingdom Location in England

The 2026 AIG Women's Open was played from 30 July to 2 August at the Royal Lytham & St Annes Golf Club Golf Links in Lancashire. It was the 50th Women's British Open, the 26th as a major championship on the LPGA Tour, and the seventh championship held under a sponsorship agreement with AIG.

Shiho Kuwaki won on the second hole of a sudden-death playoff with Esther Henseleit to claim her first major title.

== Field ==
The field was made up of 144 players. As with previous tournaments, most players earned exemptions based on past performance on the Ladies European Tour, the LPGA Tour, previous major championships, or with a high ranking in the Women's World Golf Rankings. The rest of the field earned entry by successfully competing in qualifying tournaments open to any female golfer, professional or amateur, with a low handicap. (Note: (a) – denotes amateur)

=== Exemptions ===
Players who are qualified for the event are listed below. Players are listed under the first category in which they qualified.

1. Winners of the Women's British Open, aged 60 or younger at the scheduled end of the championship, provided they are still active members of a recognised tour.

- Ashleigh Buhai
- Georgia Hall
- Ariya Jutanugarn (5,7)
- In-Kyung Kim
- Lydia Ko (5,7)
- Anna Nordqvist
- Sophia Popov
- Hinako Shibuno
- Jiyai Shin
- Yani Tseng
- Lilia Vu (13)
- Miyū Yamashita (2,5,7,10)

2. The top 10 finishers and ties from the 2025 Women's British Open.

- Hsu Wei-ling
- Charley Hull (5,7,10)
- Minami Katsu (5,7)
- Megan Khang
- Kim A-lim (5,7)
- Stephanie Kyriacou
- Paula Martín Sampedro (25)
- Rio Takeda (5,7)
- Lottie Woad (7,10)

3. The top 15 on the final 2025 LET Order of Merit.

- Casandra Alexander (7)
- Helen Briem (10)
- Perrine Delacour
- Cara Gainer
- Amelia Garvey
- Darcey Harry
- Alice Hewson
- Anna Huang (10)
- Sára Kousková
- Nastasia Nadaud
- Mimi Rhodes
- Chiara Tamburlini
- Shannon Tan
- Nuria Iturrioz did not play

4. The top 5 on the 2026 LET Order of Merit not already exempt (as of 5 July 2026).

- Kajsa Arwefjäll
- Pia Babnik
- Diksha Dagar
- Alexandra Försterling
- Anna Zanusso

5. The top 35 on the final 2025 Race to the CME Globe points list.

- Céline Boutier (7,10,16)
- Choi Hye-jin (7)
- Carlota Ciganda (7)
- Lauren Coughlin (7,10)
- Lindy Duncan
- Ayaka Furue (7,16)
- Linn Grant (7)
- Nasa Hataoka (7)
- Brooke Henderson (7,16)
- Im Jin-hee (7)
- Akie Iwai (7)
- Chisato Iwai (7)
- Auston Kim (7)
- Kim Sei-young (7)
- Kim Hyo-joo (7,10)
- Grace Kim (7,16)
- Nelly Korda (7,10,13,15)
- Jennifer Kupcho (7,13)
- Lee So-mi (7)
- Andrea Lee (7)
- Minjee Lee (7,14,15)
- Gaby López (7)
- Yealimi Noh
- Ryu Hae-ran (7,14,16)
- Mao Saigo (7,13)
- Jeeno Thitikul (7,10)
- Yin Ruoning (7,14)
- Angel Yin (7) did not play

6. The top 25 on the 2026 Race to the CME Globe points list not already exempt (as of 5 July 2026).

- Pajaree Anannarukarn
- Aditi Ashok
- Jenny Bae
- Robyn Choi
- Karis Davidson
- Melanie Green
- Erika Hara
- Joo Soo-bin
- Minji Kang
- Gina Kim (10)
- Lucy Li
- Yu Liu
- Julia López Ramirez (10)
- Nanna Koerstz Madsen
- Leona Maguire
- Ryann O'Toole
- Cassie Porter
- Pauline Roussin
- Jenny Shin (10)
- Dewi Weber
- Jing Yan
- Arpichaya Yubol
- Rose Zhang
- Zhang Weiwei
- Yana Wilson (10)

7. The top 50 in the Women's World Golf Rankings (as of 5 July 2026).

- Yuna Araki
- Allisen Corpuz (15)
- Chun In-gee (14)
- Hannah Green (10)
- Esther Henseleit
- Hwang You-min
- Kim Min-sol
- Ko Jin-young
- Shiho Kuwaki (7)
- Shuri Sakuma (11)
- Maja Stark (15)
- Patty Tavatanakit
- Liu Yan
- Ina Yoon
- Yui Kawamoto (8) and Yoo Hyun-jo did not play

8. The top 3 on the JLPGA Money List not already exempt as of the Suntory Ladies Open.

- Fuka Suga
- Sayaka Takahashi

9. The top 2 on the KLPGA Money List not already exempt (as of 5 July 2026).

- Kim Min-sun
- Seo Kyo-rim did not play

10. Winners of any recognised LET or LPGA Tour events in the 2026 calendar year.

- Kelsey Bennett
- Carolina Chacarra
- Esme Hamilton
- Leonie Harm
- Noora Komulainen
- Agathe Laisné
- Lee Mi-hyang
- Smilla Tarning Sønderby
- Aunchisa Utama

11. Winner of the 2025 JLPGA Money List.

12. Winners of the 2025 KLPGA Money List.

- Hong Jung-min did not play

13. Winners of the last five editions of the Chevron Championship.

14. Winners of the last five editions of the Women's PGA Championship.

- Amy Yang

15. Winners of the last five editions of the U.S. Women's Open.

- Yuka Saso

16. Winners of the last five editions of The Evian Championship.

17. The leading two (not otherwise exempt) in the 2026 Suntory Ladies Open.

- Kana Nagai

18. A minimum of leading three golfers, not otherwise exempt, from the ISPS Handa Women's Scottish Open.

- Daniela Darquea
- Nataliya Guseva
- Chanettee Wannasaen

19. Winner of the 2025 U.S. Women's Amateur.

- Megha Ganne forfeited her exemption by turning professional

20. The 2025 Mark H. McCormack Medal winner.

- Kiara Romero (a)

21. Winner of the 2026 Women's Amateur Asia-Pacific

- Yang Yun-seo (a)

22. Winner of the 2025 Women's Amateur Latin America.

- María José Marín (a) (23)

23. Winner of the 2026 Augusta National Women's Amateur.

24. Winner of the 2026 Women's Amateur Championship.

- Valentine Delon (a)

25. Winner of the 2025 European Ladies Amateur Championship.

- Charlotte Naughton (a) (26)

26. Women's Amateur Series winner (If winner is already exempt, then the highest ranked women in the World Amateur Golf Ranking, not already exempt, as of week 30.).

27. Any player who did not compete in the previous year's Women's British Open due to maternity, who subsequently received an extension of membership for the maternity from the player's home tour in the previous year, provided she was otherwise qualified to compete in the previous year's Women's British Open.

- Nicole Broch Estrup
- Alison Lee

=== Final Qualifying ===
Final Qualifying was played over 18 holes on 27 July at St Annes Old Links.

- Justice Bosio
- Vanessa Bouvet
- Lauren Crump (a)
- Manon De Roey
- Amanda Doherty
- Jodi Ewart Shadoff
- Anna Foster
- Annabell Fuller
- Polly Mack
- Ana Peláez
- Carla Tejedo Mulet
- Bel Wardle
- Chloe Williams

== Round summaries ==
=== First round ===
Thursday, 30 July 2026

Jeeno Thitikul shot a bogey-free round of 64 (−7) to take a two-stroke lead over Shiho Kuwaki and Ryu Hae-ran. Ryu won the previous two majors of the year. Nelly Korda, winner of the year's first two majors, shot 73 (+2) and was in a tie for 53rd.

Place	Player	Score	To par
1	(Thailand) Jeeno Thitikul	64	−7
T2	(Japan) Shiho Kuwaki	66	−5
T2	(South Korea) Ryu Hae-ran	66	−5
T4	(France) Céline Boutier	67	−4
T4	(United States) Yealimi Noh	67	−4
T6	(Japan) Chisato Iwai	68	−3
T6	(Thailand) Chanettee Wannasaen	68	−3
T8	(South Africa) Ashleigh Buhai	69	−2
T8	(United States) Lauren Coughlin	69	−2
T8	(India) Diksha Dagar	69	−2
T8	(England) Charley Hull	69	−2
T8	(Spain) Paula Martín Sampedro (a)	69	−2
T8	(Japan) Mao Saigo	69	−2
T8	(Japan) Rio Takeda	69	−2
T8	(Singapore) Shannon Tan	69	−2
T8	(England) Lottie Woad	69	−2

=== Second round ===
Friday, 31 July 2026

Ryu Hae-ran, winner of the last two majors, took a one-stroke lead over Shiho Kuwaki with a 2-under-par round of 69. First round leader Jeeno Thitikul fell into a tied for third place with a 2-over-par 73. Nelly Korda, also seeking her third major win of the year, climbed up the leaderboard into a tie for 14th place with a 68.

Place	Player	Score	To par
1	(South Korea) Ryu Hae-ran	66-69=135	−7
2	(Japan) Shiho Kuwaki	66-70=136	−6
T3	(United States) Yealimi Noh	67-70=137	−5
T3	(Thailand) Jeeno Thitikul	64-73=137	−5
5	(South Korea) Joo Soo-bin	70-69=139	−3
T6	(United States) Lauren Coughlin	69-71=140	−2
T6	(England) Charley Hull	69-71=140	−2
T6	(Japan) Minami Katsu	72-68=140	−2
T6	(United States) Lucy Li	72-68=140	−2
T6	(Spain) Paula Martín Sampedro (a)	69-71=140	−2
T6	(Thailand) Chanettee Wannasaen	68-72=140	−2
T6	(England) Lottie Woad	69-71=140	−2
T6	(United States) Jing Yan	72-68=140	−2

=== Third round ===
Saturday, 1 August 2026

Yealimi Noh shot a third round 69 to take a three-stroke lead over five competitors, including second round leader Ryu Hae-ran (74) and first round leader Jeeno Thitikul (72). Nelly Korda was eight strokes off the lead in tied-16th place.

Place	Player	Score	To par
1	(United States) Yealimi Noh	67-70-69=206	−7
T2	(Germany) Esther Henseleit	73-69-67=209	−4
T2	(Japan) Shiho Kuwaki	66-70-73=209	−4
T2	(United States) Lucy Li	72-68-69=209	−4
T2	(South Korea) Ryu Hae-ran	66-69-74=209	−4
T2	(Thailand) Jeeno Thitikul	64-73-72=209	−4
7	(England) Lottie Woad	69-71-70=210	−3
T6	(Japan) Ayaka Furue	76-70-65=211	−2
T6	(England) Charley Hull	69-71-71=211	−2
T6	(Japan) Minami Katsu	72-68-71=211	−2
T6	(Thailand) Chanettee Wannasaen	68-72-71=211	−2

=== Final round ===
Sunday, 2 August 2026

Shiho Kuwaki and Esther Henseleit both shot 70 to end regulation play in a tie at 279 (−5). The sudden-death playoff was conducted at the 18th hole. Both players parred the hole the first time. Henseleit bogeyed the hole the second time while Kuwaki had a tap-in par.

Third round leader Yealimi Noh shot a 74 and ended in third place. Nelly Korda, winner of the first two majors of the year, ended in a tie for 4th place (282) while Ryu Hae-ran, winner of the year's other two majors, finished in a tied for 6th (283).

Place	Player	Score	To par	Money ($)
T1	(Japan) Shiho Kuwaki	66-70-73-70=279	−5	Playoff
T1	(Germany) Esther Henseleit	73-69-67-70=279	−5	Playoff
3	(United States) Yealimi Noh	67-70-69-74=280	−4	668,050
T4	(United States) Nelly Korda	73-68-73-68=282	−2	456,601
T4	(Thailand) Jeeno Thitikul	64-73-72-73=282	−2	456,601
T6	(South Korea) Ryu Hae-ran	66-69-74-74=283	−1	247,127
T6	(England) Charley Hull	69-71-71-72=283	−1	247,127
T6	(England) Lottie Woad	69-71-70-73=283	−1	247,127
T6	(Chinese Taipei) Hsu Wei-ling	71-74-69-69=283	−1	247,127
T6	(Singapore) Shannon Tan	69-74-71-69=283	−1	247,127
T6	(Japan) Rio Takeda	69-73-72-69=283	−1	247,127

==== Playoff ====
The sudden-death playoff was held over the 18th hole until there was a winner.

Place	Player	Scores	Prize money (US$)
1	(Japan) Shiho Kuwaki	4-4=8	1,500,000
2	(Germany) Esther Henseleit	4-5=9	921,872
