= 2025 LPGA of Japan Tour =

Golf tour season

The 2025 LPGA of Japan Tour was the 57th season of the LPGA of Japan Tour, the professional golf tour for women operated by the Japan Ladies Professional Golfers' Association.

Leading money winner was Shuri Sakuma with ¥227,285,959. She also won the Mercedes Ranking, had the lowest scoring average and finished most often (19 times) inside the top-10.

== Schedule ==
The results of the season are given in the table below. "Date" is the end date of the tournament. The number in parentheses after winners' names shows the player's total number wins in official money individual events on the LPGA of Japan Tour, including that event.

Date	Tournament	Location	Prize fund (¥)	Winner	WWGR pts
9 Mar	Daikin Orchid Ladies Golf Tournament	Okinawa	120,000,000	(Japan) Chisato Iwai (8)	17.5
23 Mar	V Point-SMBC Ladies Golf Tournament	Chiba	100,000,000	(Japan) Yuri Yoshida (4)	18.5
30 Mar	AXA Ladies Golf Tournament in Miyazaki	Miyazaki	100,000,000	(Japan) Haruka Kudō (1)	16.5
6 Apr	Yamaha Ladies Open Katsuragi	Shizuoka	100,000,000	(Japan) Lala Anai (6)	16.0
13 Apr	Fuji Film Studio Alice Women's Open	Saitama	100,000,000	(Japan) Yuka Yasuda (2)	19.0
20 Apr	KKT Cup Vantelin Ladies Open	Kumamoto	100,000,000	(Japan) Shuri Sakuma (1)	16.5
27 Apr	Fujisankei Ladies Classic	Shizuoka	80,000,000	Cancelled	
4 May	Panasonic Open Ladies Golf Tournament	Chiba	80,000,000	(Japan) Nana Suganuma (3)	17.0
11 May	**World Ladies Championship Salonpas Cup**	Ibaraki	120,000,000	(South Korea) Jiyai Shin (31)	18.0
18 May	Sky RKB Ladies Classic	Fukuoka	120,000,000	(Japan) Sora Kamiya (3)	16.5
25 May	Bridgestone Ladies Open	Chiba	100,000,000	(Japan) Shuri Sakuma (2)	16.0
1 Jun	Resort Trust Ladies	Hyogo	140,000,000	(Japan) Nanako Inagaki (1)	15.0
8 Jun	Yonex Ladies Golf Tournament	Niigata	90,000,000	(Japan) Aihi Takano (1)	15.5
15 Jun	Ai Miyazato Suntory Ladies Open Golf Tournament	Hyōgo	150,000,000	(Japan) Sayaka Takahashi (2)	17.0
22 Jun	Nichirei Ladies	Chiba	100,000,000	(Japan) Hibiki Iriya (1)	16.0
29 Jun	Earth Mondahmin Cup	Chiba	300,000,000	(Japan) Shuri Sakuma (3)	17.5
6 Jul	Shiseido-JAL Ladies Open	Kanagawa	140,000,000	(Japan) Saki Nagamine (3)	16.0
13 Jul	Minebea Mitsumi Ladies Hokkaido Shimbun Cup	Hokkaido	100,000,000	(Japan) Kotoko Uchida (1)	17.0
20 Jul	Meiji Yasuda Ladies Golf Tournament	Miyagi	100,000,000	(Japan) Sakura Koiwai (12)	16.5
27 Jul	Daito Kentaku Eheyanet Ladies	Fukuoka	120,000,000	(Japan) Ayaka Watanabe (6)	16.0
10 Aug	Hokkaido Meiji Cup	Hokkaido	90,000,000	(Japan) Yui Kawamoto (3)	17.0
17 Aug	NEC Karuizawa 72 Golf Tournament	Nagano	100,000,000	(Japan) Asuka Kashiwabara (3)	16.0
24 Aug	CAT Ladies	Kanagawa	80,000,000	(Japan) Kokona Sakurai (5)	15.5
31 Aug	Nitori Ladies Golf Tournament	Hokkaido	100,000,000	(Japan) Ai Suzuki (21)	16.0
7 Sep	Golf 5 Ladies Professional Golf Tournament	Chiba	80,000,000	(Japan) Yuna Araki (1)	14.0
14 Sep	**Sony JLPGA Championship**	Okinawa	300,000,000	(Japan) Shina Kanazawa (1)	26.0
21 Sep	Sumitomo Life Vitality Ladies Tokai Classic	Aichi	100,000,000	(Japan) Sora Kamiya (4)	16.0
28 Sep	Miyagi TV Cup Dunlop Women's Open Golf Tournament	Miyagi	70,000,000	(Japan) Fuka Suga (1)	16.0
5 Oct	**Japan Women's Open Golf Championship**	Ibaraki	170,000,000	(Japan) Kotone Hori (3)	26.0
12 Oct	Stanley Ladies Honda Golf Tournament	Shizuoka	120,000,000	(Japan) Yui Kawamoto (4)	18.5
19 Oct	Fujitsu Ladies	Chiba	100,000,000	(Japan) Ayako Kimura (2)	16.5
26 Oct	Nobuta Group Masters GC Ladies	Hyōgo	200,000,000	(Japan) Shuri Sakuma (4)	18.0
2 Nov	Hisako Higuchi Mitsubishi Electric Ladies Golf Tournament	Saitama	100,000,000	(Japan) Kano Nakamura (1)	16.0
9 Nov	Toto Japan Classic^	Shiga	US$2,100,000	(Japan) Nasa Hataoka (7)	24.0
16 Nov	Ito En Ladies Golf Tournament	Chiba	100,000,000	(Japan) Hana Wakimoto (1)	16.5
23 Nov	Daio Paper Elleair Ladies Open	Ehime	100,000,000	(Taiwan) Wu Chia-yen (1)	16.5
30 Nov	**Japan LPGA Tour Championship Ricoh Cup**	Miyazaki	120,000,000	(Japan) Ai Suzuki (22)	18.0

Events in bold are majors on JLPGA.
^ The Toto Japan Classic was co-sanctioned with the LPGA Tour.
