= Yuzuki Yoshizawa =

Japanese professional golfer (born 2003)

Yuzuki Yoshizawa 吉澤 柚月
Personal information
- Full name: Yuzuki Yoshizawa
- Nicknames: Yuzu, Yuzuki-chan
- Nationality: Japan
- Born: 23 November 2003 (age 22) Ichikawa, Chiba, Japan
- Height: 164 cm (5 ft 5 in)

Career
- Sport: Golf
- College: Japan Wellness Sports University
- Turned professional: 2023
- Current tour: LPGA of Japan Tour
- Former tour: LPGA of Japan Tour Step Up Tour
- Professional wins: 2

Number of wins by tour
- LPGA of Japan Tour: 1
- Other: 1

Yuzuki Yoshizawa (吉澤 柚月, Yoshizawa Yuzuki) (born 23 November 2003) is a Japanese professional golfer and belongs to the Diamond Generation. She has won one time on the LPGA of Japan Tour.

== Early life and amateur career ==
Yoshizawa began playing golf at the age of 9, motivated by her father. She has experience in dancing.

In 2014 (5th grade), she finished second in the National Elementary School Golf Championship "Kaname Yokoo Cup" (Girls' Division for grades 5–6) and won the same tournament the following year in 2015 (6th grade). In the same year, she also won the Chiba Prefecture Elementary School Golf Tournament, placed fourth in the Kanto Elementary School Golf Tournament, and finished eleventh in the National Elementary School Golf Tournament.

After entering Reitaku Junior and Senior High School, she won the KGA Cup Junior Golf Tournament in 2016 (7th grade). In 2017 (8th grade), she won the Chiba Prefecture Junior Golf Championship and placed fourth in the Kanto Junior High School Golf Championship (Summer Tournament). In 2018 (9th grade) she won the Kanto Junior High School Golf Championship (Summer Tournament). She also contributed to consecutive team victories in the Kanto Junior High School Golf Championship in 2017 and 2018, as well as three consecutive team titles in the National Junior High School Golf Championship from 2016 to 2018. Additionally, she helped secure a third-place team finish at the 2018 National Sports Festival. After advancing to the senior high school division, she was the top qualifier in the Kanto High School Championship, Chiba Girls' Individual Preliminaries in 2019 (10th grade) and 2021 (12th grade). She also contributed to a second-place team finish at the National Sports Festival in 2019 (10th grade) and a team victory at the Kanto High School Golf Championship Special Tournament in 2020 (11th grade). Among her high school teammates were Yuri Yoshida, Mao Saigo, and Hinano Muguruma who are her seniors by three, two, and one year, respectively.

Yoshizawa participated in her first JLPGA tournament at the 2019 Nichirei Ladies (21–23 June), via the qualifier. However, she missed the cut by 15 strokes. However, at the Ito En Ladies Golf Tournament (15–17 November) entering through another qualifier, she tied for 34th place and won the Best Amateur Award. In 2022, she enrolled at Nihon Wellness Sports University from which she graduated in 2026. At the 2023 Fujifilm Studio Alice Ladies Open (7–9 April), she finished in a 34th place tie and won another Best Amateur Award.

In Yoshizawa's first attempt for the JLPGA Player Certification Test in 2021, she was eliminated in the second qualifying stage (12–15 October). In her second attempt in 2022, she advanced to the final qualifying stage (1–4 November), but finished in at a 34th-place tie, shy of the qualifying line by three strokes. She passed the test on her third attempt, finishing in 11th-place and became a formal member of the 96th class of the LPGA of Japan Tour as of 1 December 2023.

At the Qualifying Tournament Final Stage (28 November – 1 December), she finished in 28th place, securing LPGA of Japan Tour participation exemption until the first re-ranking of the 2024 season.

== Professional career ==
=== 2024 ===
Yoshizawa made the cut for the first and only time for her first season at the Nichirei Ladies (14–16 June), finishing in 32nd place. She ranked 68th in the first re-ranking (16 June) and 81st in the second re-ranking (22 September), limiting her play time on the LPGA of Japan Tour for the rest of the year.

Meanwhile, in her Step Up Tour debut at the Royal Meadow Cup (3–5 July), Yoshizawa shared first place after the second round, only to finish in a second-place tie after a playoff. In her second event, the Castrol Ladies (24–26 July), she shared the lead through the first two rounds but struggled on the final day and ended up in a sixth-place tie. In her final tournament of the season, the Yamaguchi Shunan Ladies Cup (7–9 November), she finished day 2 as the sole leader for the first time from second place the previous day, but couldn't hang in on the final day, and had to settle for a second-place tie, again.

In her first year as a professional, Yoshizawa competed in 19 LPGA of Japan Tour tournaments, finishing 148th in the Mercedes Rankings and 151st on the prize money list. On the Step Up Tour, she played in 12 tournaments and recorded five top-10 finishes, including two in second-place. and one in third-place. At the Qualifying Tournament Final Stage (26-29 November), she placed 48th, securing only limited playing time till the first re-ranking of the 2025 season.

=== 2025 ===
In the first re-ranking (22 June), Yoshizawa ranked 56th, thereby able to secure only limited eligibility on the LPGA of Japan Tour till the second re-ranking. In the second re-ranking (28 September), she rose to 32nd, earning exemption for the remainder of the season.

On the other hand, on the Step Up Tour at the Sanyo Shimbun Ladies Cup (19–21 September), she started the final round in sixth place, three strokes off the lead, and shot a personal best bogey-free round of 64 to bring her total score to 16-under par, enough to earn her her first professional victory by a two-stroke margin.

In her second year as a professional, Yoshizawa competed in 23 LPGA of Japan Tour events, finishing 70th in the Mercedes Rankings and 86th in the prize money list. On the Step Up Tour, she competed in four events, recording one win and one other top-10 finish. She could only manage 76th place for the Qualifying Tournament rankings, resulting in a significant reduction in opportunities to play until the first re-ranking of the following 2026 season.

=== 2026 ===
On the final day of the Resort Trust Ladies (28–31 May), Yoshizawa shared the lead with Yui Kawamoto at 10-under par after regulation play, but lost out on the second playoff hole, to finish in second place. This marked her first top-10 finish on the tour. By the time of the first re-ranking (21 June), she had competed in nine tournaments, gaining entry through sponsor exemptions and Monday qualifiers, not missing a single cut, and this performance earned her the number two spot on the re-ranking list, securing play time until the second re-ranking. At the 46th Meiji Cup (7–9 August), she started the final day tied for the lead for the first time on the regular tour. After she pulled ahead with a birdie on the second hole, she held on to the end, recording a 69, including 5 birdies and 2 bogeys, and finished with a total score of −8, 2 strokes ahead of Kana Nagai, to capture her maiden win on the LPGA of Japan Tour. At the Sony Japan LPGA Championship (10–13 September), she moved up to second place on the second day and maintained that position on the third day, just one stroke off the lead. On the final day, she pulled into a tie for the lead with a birdie on the 11th hole and finished regulation play at 9-under par tied with Miyū Yamashita to force a playoff. However, she missed her par putt on the first playoff hole and had to settle for sole second place.

== Professional wins (2) ==
=== LPGA of Japan Tour wins (1) ===
No.	Date	Tournament	Winning score	To par	Margin of victory	Runner-up
1	9 Aug 2026	Meiji Cup	69-70-69=208	−8	2 strokes	(Japan) Kana Nagai

=== LPGA of Japan Step Up Tour wins (1) ===
No.	Date	Tournament	Winning score	To par	Margin of victory	Runner(s)-up
1	21 Sep 2025	SanyoShimbun Ladies Cup	70-66-64=200	−16	2 strokes	(Japan) Reina Kato (Japan) Asuka Minayoshi (Japan) Hinano Muguruma

== World ranking ==
Position in Women's World Golf Rankings at the end of each calendar year.

Year	Ranking	Source
2024	494	
2025	333	
