= Rin Yoshida =

Japanese professional golfer (born 2004)

Rin Yoshida 吉田 鈴
Personal information
- Nationality: Japan
- Born: 21 February 2004 (age 22) Ichikawa, Chiba, Japan
- Height: 153 cm (5 ft 0 in)

Career
- Sport: Golf
- College: Japan Wellness Sports University
- Turned professional: 2024
- Current tour: LPGA of Japan Tour
- Professional wins: 2

Number of wins by tour
- LPGA of Japan Tour: 2

Rin Yoshida (吉田 鈴, Yoshida Rin) (born 21 February 2004) is a Japanese professional golfer. She has two wins on the LPGA of Japan Tour.

== Early life and amateur career ==
Yoshida began to play golf at the age of 6, due to her older sister, Yuri's influence.

She passed the JLPGA Player Certification Test on her fourth attempt, finishing in a 19th-place tie and became a member of the 97th class of the LPGA of Japan Tour as of 1 December 2024.

== Professional career ==
In February 2025, it was announced that Yoshida had signed an affiliation agreement with the Daito Trust Construction.

In the 27th Yonex Ladies Golf Tournament (5–7 June 2026), she started the final day in the sole lead. She recorded a 71, including 3 birdies and 2 bogeys, and finished with a total score of −8, 2 strokes ahead of Ko Kurabayashi, Megumi Kido and Yumeno Masada, to capture her maiden win on the LPGA of Japan Tour.

== Personal life ==
Her older sister, Yuri is also a professional golfer on the LPGA Tour and the LPGA of Japan Tour.

== Professional wins (2) ==
=== LPGA of Japan Tour wins (2) ===
No.	Date	Tournament	Winning score	To par	Margin of victory	Runner-up
1	7 Jun 2026	Yonex Ladies Golf Tournament	70-67-71=208	−8	2 strokes	(Japan) Ko Kurabayashi (Japan) Megumi Kido (Japan) Yumeno Masada
2	23 Aug 2026	CAT Ladies	69-66-68=203	−13	2 strokes	(Japan) Yuna Araki
