= 2026 LPGA Tour =

Professional women's golf tour

2026 LPGA Tour season
- Duration: January 29, 2026 – November 22, 2026
- Number of official events: 31
- Most wins: 5 (Thailand) Jeeno Thitikul
- Race to CME Globe Winner: (United States) Nelly Korda
- Money leader: (Thailand) Jeeno Thitikul
- Vare Trophy: (Japan) Miyū Yamashita
- Rolex Player of the Year: (United States) Nelly Korda
- Rookie of the Year: (Japan) Erika Hara

The 2026 LPGA Tour is the 77th edition of the LPGA Tour, a series of professional golf tournaments for elite female golfers from around the world. The season began at the Hilton Grand Vacations Tournament of Champions, in Orlando, Florida on January 29, and will end on November 22, at the Tiburón Golf Club in the CME Group Tour Championship at Naples, Florida. The tournaments were sanctioned by the United States-based Ladies Professional Golf Association (LPGA).

== Schedule and results ==
The number in parentheses after each winners' name is the player's total number of wins in official money individual events on the LPGA Tour, including that event. Tournament and winner names in bold indicate LPGA majors. The schedule and purse amount for each tournament is listed on the LPGA website. The LPGA has a standard formula for payout percentages and distribution of its purse and prize money for every event. The winner typically gets 15% of the total, second place gets 9.3%, third place 6.75%, etc.

The total purse for 2026 is $132 million.

Key

Major championships
Regular events

Date	Tournament	Location	Winner(s) (Note: The number in brackets after each winner's name is the number of LPGA Tour events he had won up to and including that tournament. This information is only shown for LPGA Tour members.)	WWGR points	Other tours (Note: CLPGA − China LPGA Tour, JLPGA − LPGA of Japan Tour, LET − Ladies European Tour.)	Purse (US$)	Winner's share ($)
Feb 1	Hilton Grand Vacations Tournament of Champions	Florida	(United States) Nelly Korda (16)	39.60		2,100,000	315,000
Feb 22	Honda LPGA Thailand	Thailand	(Thailand) Jeeno Thitikul (8)	50.80		1,800,000	270,000
Mar 1	HSBC Women's World Championship	Singapore	(Australia) Hannah Green (7)	58.08		3,000,000	450,000
Mar 8	Blue Bay LPGA	China	(South Korea) Lee Mi-hyang (3)	19.70	CLPGA	2,600,000	390,000
Mar 22	Fortinet Founders Cup	California	(South Korea) Kim Hyo-joo (8)	59.28		3,000,000	450,000
Mar 29	Ford Championship	Arizona	(South Korea) Kim Hyo-joo (9)	61.43		2,250,000	337,500
Apr 5	Aramco Championship	Nevada	(United States) Lauren Coughlin (3)	66.11	LET	4,000,000	600,000
Apr 19	JM Eagle LA Championship	California	(Australia) Hannah Green (8)	44.30		4,750,000	712,500
Apr 26	**Chevron Championship**	Texas	(United States) **Nelly Korda** (17)	100		9,000,000	1,350,000
May 3	Riviera Maya Open	Mexico	(United States) Nelly Korda (18)	19.17		2,500,000	375,000
May 10	Mizuho Americas Open	New Jersey	(Thailand) Jeeno Thitikul (9)	57.64		3,250,000	487,500
May 17	Kroger Queen City Championship	Ohio	(England) Lottie Woad (2)	53.60		2,000,000	300,000
May 31	ShopRite LPGA Classic	New Jersey	(France) Céline Boutier (7)	19.18		2,000,000	300,000
Jun 7	**U.S. Women's Open**	California	(United States) **Nelly Korda** (19)	100		12,500,000	2,500,000
Jun 14	Dow Championship	Michigan	(United States) Gina Kim (1) and (United States) Yana Wilson (1)	n/a		3,250,000	402,619 (each)
Jun 21	Meijer LPGA Classic	Michigan	(Japan) Miyū Yamashita (3)	34.40		3,000,000	450,000
Jun 28	**KPMG Women's PGA Championship**	Minnesota	(South Korea) **Ryu Hae-ran** (4)	100		13,000,000	1,950,000
Jul 12	**Amundi Evian Championship**	France	(South Korea) **Ryu Hae-ran** (5)	100	LET	9,100,000	1,400,000
Jul 26	ISPS Handa Women's Scottish Open	Scotland	(South Korea) Jenny Shin (2)	52.90	LET	2,000,000	300,000
Aug 2	**AIG Women's Open**	England	(Japan) **Shiho Kuwaki** (1)	100	LET	10,000,000	1,500,000
Aug 16	Standard Portland Classic	Oregon	(Thailand) Jeeno Thitikul (10)	31.50		2,000,000	300,000
Aug 23	CPKC Women's Open	Canada	(Japan) Miyū Yamashita (4)	48.67		2,750,000	412,500
Aug 30	FM Championship	Massachusetts	(China) Yin Ruoning (6)	64.84		4,400,000	660,000
Sep 27	Walmart NW Arkansas Championship	Arkansas	(Japan) Yuna Nishimura (1)	34.10		3,000,000	450,000
Oct 4	Lotte Championship	Hawaii	(Thailand) Jeeno Thitikul (11)	35.40		3,000,000	450,000
Oct 18	Buick LPGA Shanghai	China	(China) Yin Ruoning (7)	32.90	CLPGA	3,200,000	480,000
Oct 25	BMW Ladies Championship	South Korea	(Japan) Yuri Yoshida (1)	42.50		2,350,000	367,500
Nov 1	Maybank Championship	Malaysia	(Japan) Miyū Yamashita (5)	28.10		3,000,000	450,000
Nov 8	Toto Japan Classic	Japan	(Japan) Shuri Sakuma (1)	30.00	JLPGA	2,100,000	315,000
Nov 15	The ANNIKA	Florida	(United States) Lindy Duncan (1)	41.90		3,250,000	487,500
Nov 22	CME Group Tour Championship	Florida	(Thailand) Jeeno Thitikul (12)			11,000,000	4,000,000

=== Unofficial events ===
The following events appear on the schedule, but do not carry official money.

Date	Tournament	Location	Winner	WWGR points	Purse (US$)	Winner's share ($)
Sep 13	Solheim Cup	The Netherlands	Europe	n/a	–	–
Dec 14	Grant Thornton Invitational	Florida		n/a	4,000,000	500,000

== See also ==
- 2026 Ladies European Tour
