= 2023 LPGA of Japan Tour =

Golf tour season

The 2023 LPGA of Japan Tour was the 55th season of the LPGA of Japan Tour, the professional golf tour for women operated by the Japan Ladies Professional Golfers' Association.

Like in the previous year, the leading money winner was Miyū Yamashita with ¥213,554,215. She also won the Mercedes Ranking, had the lowest scoring average and finished most often (20 times) inside the top-10.

== Schedule ==
The results of the season are given in the table below. "Date" is the end date of the tournament. The number in parentheses after winners' names shows the player's total number wins in official money individual events on the LPGA of Japan Tour, including that event.

Date	Tournament	Location	Prize fund (¥)	Winner	WWGR pts
5 Mar	Daikin Orchid Ladies Golf Tournament	Okinawa	120,000,000	(South Korea) Jiyai Shin (29)	18.5
12 Mar	Meiji Yasuda Life Ladies Yokohama Tire Golf Tournament	Kōchi	100,000,000	(Japan) Hikaru Yoshimoto (1)	19.0
19 Mar	T-Point ENEOS Golf Tournament	Kagoshima	100,000,000	(Japan) Serena Aoki (4)	19.0
26 Mar	AXA Ladies Golf Tournament in Miyazaki	Miyazaki	100,000,000	(Japan) Hinako Yamauchi (1)	19.0
2 Apr	Yamaha Ladies Open Katsuragi	Shizuoka	100,000,000	(Japan) Lala Anai (4)	18.5
9 Apr	Fuji Film Studio Alice Ladies Open	Hyōgo	100,000,000	(Japan) Miyū Yamashita (7)	18.5
16 Apr	KKT Cup Vantelin Ladies Open	Kumamoto	100,000,000	(Japan) Akie Iwai (1)	17.5
23 Apr	Fujisankei Ladies Classic	Shizuoka	80,000,000	(Japan) Sora Kamiya (1)	17.5
30 Apr	Panasonic Open Ladies Golf Tournament	Chiba	80,000,000	(Japan) Lala Anai (5)	19.0
7 May	**World Ladies Championship Salonpas Cup**	Ibaraki	120,000,000	(Japan) Yuri Yoshida (3)	19.5
14 May	RKB Mitsui Matsushima Ladies	Fukuoka	120,000,000	(Japan) Chisato Iwai (3)	19.0
21 May	Bridgestone Ladies Open	Aichi	100,000,000	(Japan) Miyū Yamashita (8)	19.0
28 May	Resort Trust Ladies	Shizuoka	140,000,000	(Japan) Miyū Yamashita (9)	19.0
4 Jun	Richard Mille Yonex Ladies Golf Tournament	Shizuoka	90,000,000	(Japan) Fumika Kawagishi (2)	18.0
11 Jun	Ai Miyazato Suntory Ladies Open Golf Tournament	Hyōgo	150,000,000	(Japan) Chisato Iwai (4)	19.0
18 Jun	Nichirei Ladies	Chiba	100,000,000	(Japan) Miyū Yamashita (10)	18.0
25 Jun	Earth Mondahmin Cup	Chiba	300,000,000	(South Korea) Jiyai Shin (30)	19.0
2 Jul	Shiseido Ladies Open	Kanagawa	120,000,000	(Japan) Kokona Sakurai (1)	17.0
9 Jul	MinebeaMitsumi Ladies Hokkaido Shimbun Cup	Hokkaido	100,000,000	(Japan) Sakura Koiwai (9)	14.0
23 Jul	Daito Kentaku Eheyanet Ladies	Fukuoka	120,000,000	(Japan) Mio Kotaki (1)	18.5
30 Jul	Rakuten Super Ladies	Hyōgo	100,000,000	(Japan) Kokona Sakurai (2)	17.0
6 Aug	Hokkaido Meiji Cup	Hokkaido	90,000,000	(Japan) Ai Suzuki (18)	16.5
13 Aug	NEC Karuizawa 72 Golf Tournament	Nagano	100,000,000	(Japan) Nana Suganuma (1)	15.0
20 Aug	CAT Ladies	Kanagawa	60,000,000	(Japan) Minami Hirata (1)	18.5
27 Aug	Nitori Ladies Golf Tournament	Hokkaido	100,000,000	(Japan) Erika Kikuchi (6)	18.0
3 Sep	Golf 5 Ladies	Hokkaido	70,000,000	(Japan) Kokona Sakurai (3)	17.0
10 Sep	**Japan LPGA Championship Konica Minolta Cup**	Nagasaki	200,000,000	(Japan) Sora Kamiya (2)	26.0
17 Sep	Sumitomo Life Vitality Ladies Tokai Classic	Aichi	100,000,000	(Japan) Akie Iwai (2)	19.0
24 Sep	Miyagi TV Cup Dunlop Women's Open Golf Tournament	Miyagi	70,000,000	(Japan) Akie Iwai (3)	19.0
1 Oct	**Japan Women's Open Golf Championship**	Fukui	150,000,000	(Japan) Erika Hara (5)	26.0
8 Oct	Stanley Ladies Honda Golf Tournament	Shizuoka	120,000,000	(China) Haruka Morita-WanyaoLu (2)	19.0
15 Oct	Fujitsu Ladies	Chiba	100,000,000	(Japan) Kokona Sakurai (4)	19.0
22 Oct	Nobuta Group Masters GC Ladies	Hyōgo	200,000,000	(Japan) Nana Suganuma (2)	19.0
29 Oct	Hisako Higuchi Mitsubishi Electric Ladies Golf Tournament	Saitama	100,000,000	(South Korea) Hana Lee (1)	19.0
5 Nov	Toto Japan Classic^	Ibaraki	US$2,000,000	(Japan) Mone Inami (13)	26.0
12 Nov	Ito En Ladies Golf Tournament	Chiba	100,000,000	(Japan) Mao Saigo (6)	19.0
19 Nov	Daio Paper Elleair Ladies Open	Ehime	100,000,000	(Japan) Serena Aoki (5)	19.0
26 Nov	**Japan LPGA Tour Championship Ricoh Cup**	Miyazaki	120,000,000	(Japan) Miyū Yamashita (11)	17.5

Events in bold are majors.
^ The Toto Japan Classic was co-sanctioned with the LPGA Tour.
