= 2026 LPGA of Japan Tour =

Golf tour season

The 2026 LPGA of Japan Tour is the 58th season of the LPGA of Japan Tour, the professional golf tour for women operated by the Japan Ladies Professional Golfers' Association.

== Schedule ==
The results of the season are given in the table below. "Date" is the end date of the tournament. The number in parentheses after winners' names shows the player's total number wins in official money individual events on the LPGA of Japan Tour, including that event.

Date	Tournament	Location	Prize fund (¥)	Winner	WWGR pts
8 Mar	Daikin Orchid Ladies Golf Tournament	Okinawa	120,000,000	(Japan) Shuri Sakuma (5)	18.70
15 Mar	Taiwan Foxconn Ladies Golf Tournament†	Taiwan	US$2,000,000	(Japan) Fuka Suga (2)	18.52
22 Mar	V Point-SMBC Ladies Golf Tournament	Chiba	100,000,000	(Japan) Ritsuko Ryū (7)	17.85
29 Mar	AXA Ladies Golf Tournament in Miyazaki	Miyazaki	100,000,000	(Japan) Saki Nagamine (4)	17.75
5 Apr	Yamaha Ladies Open Katsuragi	Shizuoka	100,000,000	(Japan) Sayaka Takahashi (3)	17.90
12 Apr	Fuji Film Studio Alice Women's Open	Saitama	100,000,000	(Taiwan) Wu Chia-yen (2)	18.70
19 Apr	KKT Cup Vantelin Ladies Open	Kumamoto	100,000,000	(Japan) Sayaka Takahashi (4)	18.40
4 May	NTT docomo Business Ladies	Chiba	120,000,000	(Japan) Nana Suganuma (4)	17.95
10 May	**World Ladies Championship Salonpas Cup**	Ibaraki	150,000,000	(Japan) Yui Kawamoto (5)	18.55
17 May	Sky RKB Ladies Classic	Fukuoka	120,000,000	(Japan) Shiho Kuwaki (4)	18.10
24 May	Bridgestone Ladies Open	Chiba	100,000,000	(Japan) Hibiki Iriya (2)	18.40
31 May	Resort Trust Ladies	Fukushima	140,000,000	(Japan) Yui Kawamoto (6)	16.95
7 Jun	Yonex Ladies Golf Tournament	Niigata	90,000,000	(Japan) Rin Yoshida (1)	8.00
14 Jun	Ai Miyazato Suntory Ladies Open Golf Tournament	Hyōgo	150,000,000	(Japan) Shiho Kuwaki (5)	17.50
21 Jun	Nichirei Ladies	Chiba	100,000,000	(South Korea) Lee Min-young (8)	16.80
29 Jun	Earth Mondahmin Cup	Chiba	400,000,000	(South Korea) Park Hyun-kyung (1)	18.60
5 Jul	Shiseido-JAL Ladies Open	Kanagawa	140,000,000	(Japan) Ko Kurabayashi (1)	16.55
12 Jul	Minebea Mitsumi Ladies Hokkaido Shimbun Cup	Hokkaido	100,000,000	(Japan) Kana Nagai (2)	16.30
19 Jul	Meiji Yasuda Ladies Golf Tournament	Miyagi	100,000,000	(Japan) Miyuu Abe (2)	18.63
26 Jul	Daito Kentaku Eheyanet Ladies	Fukuoka	120,000,000	(Japan) Reina Kato (1)	15.30
9 Aug	Hokkaido Meiji Cup	Hokkaido	90,000,000	(Japan) Yuzuki Yoshizawa (1)	17.50
16 Aug	NEC Karuizawa 72 Golf Tournament	Nagano	100,000,000	(Japan) Yuka Yasuda (3)	18.30
23 Aug	CAT Ladies	Kanagawa	80,000,000	(Japan) Rin Yoshida (2)	18.30
30 Aug	Nitori Ladies Golf Tournament	Hokkaido	100,000,000	(Japan) Shuri Sakuma (6)	17.20
6 Sep	Golf 5 Ladies Professional Golf Tournament	Ishikawa	70,000,000	(Japan) Mei Fukuda (1)	16.45
13 Sep	**Sony JLPGA Championship**	Ishikawa	220,000,000	(Japan) Miyū Yamashita (14)	26.00
20 Sep	Sumitomo Life Vitality Ladies Tokai Classic	Aichi	100,000,000	(Japan) Shuri Sakuma (7)	18.53
27 Sep	Miyagi TV Cup Dunlop Women's Open Golf Tournament	Miyagi	70,000,000	(Japan) Shiho Kuwaki (6)	18.10
4 Oct	**Japan Women's Open Golf Championship**	Hyōgo	170,000,000	(South Korea) Jiyai Shin (32)	26.00
11 Oct	Stanley Ladies Honda Golf Tournament	Shizuoka	120,000,000	(Japan) Akie Iwai (7)	19.00
18 Oct	Fujitsu Ladies	Chiba	150,000,000	(Japan) Ai Suzuki (23)	18.63
25 Oct	Nobuta Group Masters GC Ladies	Hyōgo	200,000,000	(Japan) Shiho Kuwaki (7)	18.82
1 Nov	Hisako Higuchi Mitsubishi Electric Ladies Golf Tournament	Saitama	100,000,000	(Japan) Shuri Sakuma (8)	16.95
8 Nov	Toto Japan Classic^	Ibaraki	US$2,100,000	(Japan) Shuri Sakuma (9)	30.00
15 Nov	Ito En Ladies Golf Tournament	Chiba	100,000,000	(Japan) Shiho Kuwaki (8)	18.40
22 Nov	Daio Paper Elleair Ladies Open	Ehime	100,000,000	(Japan) Yuna Araki (2)	
29 Nov	**Japan LPGA Tour Championship Ricoh Cup**	Miyazaki	150,000,000		

Events in bold are majors on JLPGA.
↑ The Taiwan Foxconn Ladies Golf Tournament was co-sanctioned with the Taiwan LPGA Tour.
^ The Toto Japan Classic was co-sanctioned with the LPGA Tour.
