= Shuri Sakuma =

Japanese professional golfer (born 2002)

Shuri Sakuma 佐久間 朱莉
Personal information
- Nationality: Japan
- Born: 11 December 2002 (age 23) Kawagoe, Saitama, Japan
- Height: 155 cm (5 ft 1 in)

Career
- Sport: Golf
- Turned professional: 2021
- Current tour: LPGA of Japan Tour
- Professional wins: 10

Number of wins by tour
- LPGA Tour: 1
- LPGA of Japan Tour: 9
- Other: 1

Best results in LPGA major championships
- Chevron Championship: CUT: 2026
- Women's PGA C'ship: DNP
- U.S. Women's Open: T22: 2026
- Women's British Open: T60: 2024
- Evian Championship: T35: 2026

Achievements and awards
- LPGA of Japan Tour Player of the Year: 2025
- LPGA of Japan Tour leading money winner: 2025

Shuri Sakuma (佐久間 朱莉, Sakuma Shuri) (born 11 December 2002) is a Japanese professional golfer. She plays on the LPGA of Japan Tour where she has nine wins.

== Career ==
Sakuma turned professional and joined the tour for the 2021 season. She played on the main tour and the JLPGA Step Up Tour where she recorded one win.

She captured the 2025 KKT Cup Vantelin Ladies Open in April for her maiden win on the JLPGA. In May, she won the Bridgestone Ladies Open to secure her second win, her first wire-to-wire win. She won the Earth Mondahmin Cup in June. She was one shot ahead of the next competitor Nana Suganuma to win at −11 (277), to secure her third JLPGA career win. In October, she won the Nobuta Group Masters GC Ladies. She was eleven shots ahead of the next competitor Miyuu Abe, setting the tour new record (four day tournament), to secure her fourth win, her second wire-to-wire win.

In 2026, by winning the Toto Japan Classic – an event co-hosted by the LPGA Tour and the JLPGA — she earned membership on the LPGA Tour. Subsequently, on 16 November of the same year, it was reported by Japanese golf media and other outlets that she had completed the formal registration process with the LPGA Tour; however, subsequently, Sakuma herself announced via her Instagram that she would not be registering as a member of the LPGA Tour for 2027, and instead intends to continue playing in Japan.

== Professional wins (10) ==
=== LPGA Tour wins (1) ===
No.	Date	Tournament	Winning score	To par	Margin of victory	Runner-up
1	8 Nov 2026	Toto Japan Classic^{[1]}	70-65-69-64=268	−20	4 strokes	(Japan) Akie Iwai

^{1} Co-sanctioned by the LPGA of Japan Tour.

=== LPGA of Japan Tour wins (9) ===
No.	Date	Tournament	Winning score	To par	Margin of victory	Runner(s)-up
1	20 Apr 2025	KKT Cup Vantelin Ladies Open	70-68-67=205	−11	2 strokes	(Japan) Momoko Osato
2	25 May 2025	Bridgestone Ladies Open	66-67-67-68=268	−20	2 strokes	(Japan) Yuna Araki (South Korea) Lee Min-young
3	29 Jun 2025	Earth Mondahmin Cup	70-67-70-70=277	−11	1 stroke	(Japan) Nana Suganuma
4	26 Oct 2025	Nobuta Group Masters GC Ladies	66-66-64-67=263	−25	11 strokes	(Japan) Miyuu Abe
5	8 Mar 2026	Daikin Orchid Ladies Golf Tournament	71-62-69-70=272	−16	1 stroke	(Japan) Kana Nagai
6	30 Aug 2026	Nitori Ladies Golf Tournament	73-71-67-66=277	−11	2 strokes	(Japan) Shiho Kuwaki
7	20 Sep 2026	Sumitomo Life Vitality Ladies Tokai Classic	68-65-68=201	−15	Playoff	(Japan) Sora Kamiya
8	1 Nov 2026	Hisako Higuchi Mitsubishi Electric Ladies Golf Tournament	68-69-66=203	−13	1 stroke	(Japan) Sakura Koiwai
9	8 Nov 2026	Toto Japan Classic^{[2]}	70-65-69-64=268	−20	4 strokes	(Japan) Akie Iwai

^{2} Co-sanctioned by the LPGA Tour.

=== JLPGA Step Up Tour wins (1) ===
- 2021 Kyoto Ladies Open
