= Nanako Inagaki =

Japanese professional golfer (born 2000)

Nanako Inagaki 稲垣 那奈子
Personal information
- Nationality: Japan
- Born: 24 August 2000 (age 26) Kawaguchi, Saitama, Japan
- Height: 164 cm (5 ft 5 in)

Career
- Sport: Golf
- Turned professional: 2023
- Current tour: LPGA of Japan Tour
- Professional wins: 1

Number of wins by tour
- LPGA of Japan Tour: 1

Nanako Inagaki (稲垣 那奈子, Inagaki Nanako) (born 24 August 2000) is a Japanese professional golfer. She plays on the LPGA of Japan Tour where she has one win.

== Career ==
She captured the 2025 Resort Trust Ladies for her maiden win on the JLPGA.

== Amateur wins ==
- 2017 Golf Digest Japan Junior Cup
- 2018 ANNIKA Invitational at Mission Hills
- 2021 Kanto Women's Collegiate Championship

== Professional wins (1) ==
=== LPGA of Japan Tour wins (1) ===
No.	Date	Tournament	Winning score	To par	Margin of victory	Runner(s)-up
1	1 Jun 2025	Resort Trust Ladies	67-71-70-73=281	−7	1 stroke	(Japan) Sora Kamiya (Japan) Fumika Kawagishi

== Team appearances ==
- Patsy Hankins Trophy (representing Asia/Pacific team): 2023
