= Fuka Suga =

Japanese professional golfer (born 2005)

Fuka Suga 菅 楓華
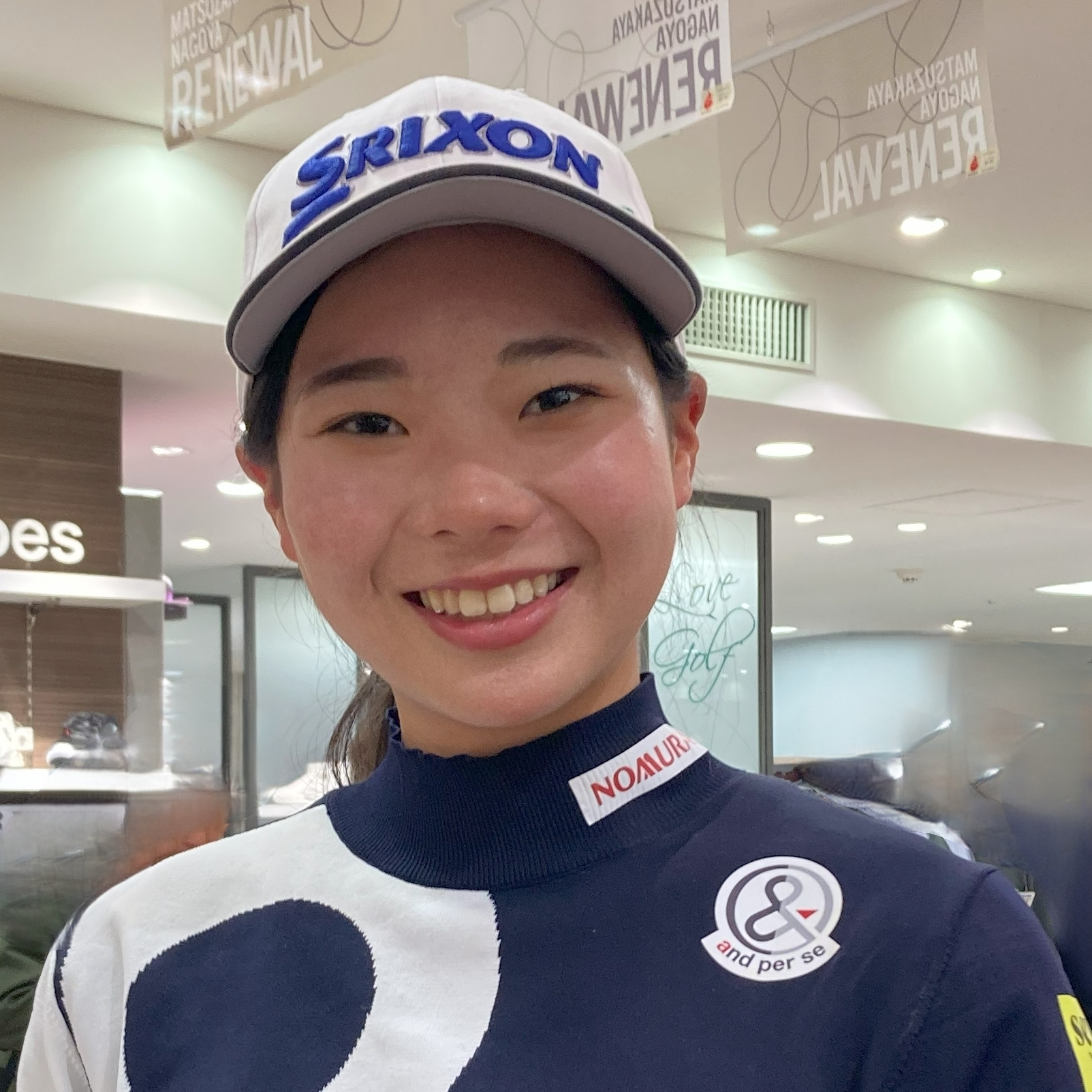
- December 2024

Personal information
- Nationality: Japan
- Born: 17 May 2005 (age 21) Miyazaki, Japan
- Height: 169 cm (5 ft 7 in)

Career
- Sport: Golf
- Turned professional: 2023
- Current tour: LPGA of Japan Tour
- Professional wins: 2

Number of wins by tour
- LPGA of Japan Tour: 2

Best results in LPGA major championships
- Chevron Championship: DNP
- Women's PGA C'ship: DNP
- U.S. Women's Open: CUT: 2026
- Women's British Open: CUT: 2026
- Evian Championship: DNP

Achievements and awards
- GTPA Rookie of the Year: 2025

Fuka Suga (菅 楓華, Suga Fuka) (born 17 May 2005) is a Japanese professional golfer. She plays on the LPGA of Japan Tour where she has one win.

== Early life and amateur career ==
Suga is the youngest of three sisters. She began to play golf at the age of 6, at the suggestion of a neighborhood friend who was 5 years her senior. She became so addicted that she asked Santa for a set of golf clubs, which she actually received.

Suga attended Nishisho Gakuen, a combined junior and senior high school renowned for golf. In 2018 and 2019, she contributed to the team's consecutive second-place finishes at the National Junior High School Golf Championship. In individual competitions, in 2018, she won the 39th Kyushu Junior High School Golf Championship Spring Tournament.

In 2021, as a high school freshman, she finished second in the Kyushu High School Golf Championship Spring Tournament, behind her same-aged teammate Yuna Araki. In 2022, in her junior year, she tied for second place at the 27th Kyushu High School and Junior High School Golf Championship (High School Division). She also contributed to her school's victory at the National High School Golf Championship. She was runner-up at the Japan Junior Golf Championship (15-17 girls division), losing in a playoff to her teammate Araki. In 2023, as a senior, she won the Eight-District Designated Player Team Competition and the 53rd Kyushu Women's Championship with a 9-stroke margin over Araki, who was in second place. She also contributed to her school's consecutive victory in the National High School Golf Championship. At the Kagoshima Special National Sports Festival, the Miyazaki Prefecture women's team, made up of members from the Nissho Gakuen High School, Suga, Araki, and Fukuda Moe, brought about Miyazaki Prefecture's first-ever victory in the tournament.

Suga participated in her first LPGA of Japan Tour tournament as an amateur in 2022, as a high school junior in the Japan Women's Open Golf Championship (29 September – 2 October), where she missed the cut by four strokes. In 2023, in her senior year of high school, she participated in the Fundokin Ladies Tournament and the Salonpas Ladies Open on the LPGA of Japan StepUp Tour, where she finished in sole third place with a score of −6 and in sole sixth place with a total score of −1, respectively, and won the Best Amateur Award in each tournament.

Suga passed the JLPGA Player Certification Test on her first attempt, finishing in a 5th-place tie and became a member of the 96th class of the LPGA of Japan Tour as of December 1, 2023.

== Professional career ==
=== 2023 ===
In the Final Qualifying Tournament (28 November – 1 December), Suga finished in 5th place. However, she was disqualified for erroneously filling in her scorecard, and she had to start her rookie year the following year in last place, at 104th place, among all Final Qualifying Tournament participants.

=== 2024 ===
In March, she signed an affiliation agreement with the Nitori Corporation.

Suga's professional debut on the LPGA of Japan Tour was at the V Point x ENEOS Golf Tournament (15–17 March), where she finished in a 7th-place tie and won the newly established Best Rookie Award. Her steady play earned her a jump in the ranking of 33rd place in the first re-ranking, enabling her to play on the LPGA of Japan Tour until the second re-ranking. At the Sumitomo Life Vitality Ladies Tokai Classic (13–15 September), she recorded a personal best score of 64 on day one to take the sole first place lead, clung onto second place on day two, but was unable to maintain her momentum and ultimately finished in an 8th-place tie. In the second re-ranking, she ranked 18th and secured play on the LPGA of Japan Tour for the remainder of the season.

In her first year, Suga competed in 22 upper-level tournaments, had four top-10 finishes, ranked 63rd in the Mercedes Rankings, and 64th in the prize money. Since she could not secure a tour card provided to the top 50 finishers in the Mercedes Rankings, she had to play in the Final Qualifying Tournament and finished in 20th place, enough for eligibility until the 1st re-ranking of the following year.

=== 2025 ===
At the end of March, it was announced that Suga had signed a sportswear contract with the and per se brand along with Reika Miyako.

In the opening tournament, the Daikin Orchid Ladies Golf Tournament (6–9 March), Suga took the lead from day one and held onto it until day three. On the final day, she and Chisato Iwai pulled away in the latter half from a bunch in a five-way tie for first place at one point, but she couldn't keep up with Iwai, who extended her lead to win the tournament. Here, Suga recorded her personal best finish of second place in a tie. In the season's second tournament, the V Point*SMBC Golf Tournament (21–23 March), with Yuri Yoshida running away with the lead, Suga achieved her first solo second-place finish, making it two consecutive second-place finishes. In the season's third tournament, the AXA Ladies Golf Tournament in Miyazaki (28–30 March), she recorded the best score of the day of 66 on day two and jumped up from 35th place to a tie for first place. However, on the final day, she fell short of the winner, Haruka Kudo, and finished in a 6th-place tie. Nonetheless, she accomplished the feat of starting in the final group on the final day for the three consecutive tournaments, which is a LPGA of Japan Tour record. In the 1st re-ranking in June, Suga claimed 1st place. On day two of the Earth Mondamin Cup (26–29 June), one down from the cut line at the final hole, she squeezed in a birdie and barely made it at 60th place. She carried on the momentum and recorded a personal and course record tie of 64 on day three, jumping up to a 6th place tie. However, on the final day, she ran short and finished in an 8th-place tie.

At the 52nd Miyagi Television Cup Dunlop Women's Open Golf Tournament (26–28 September), she started the final day in a tie for 10th place, two strokes behind the leader. She recorded the best score of the day with a 65, including birdies at the final two holes, to take the sole lead, and finished with a total score of −9, two strokes ahead of Shiho Anai and Sora Kamiya playing in later groups, to capture her maiden win on the LPGA of Japan Tour.

In her second year, Suga competed in 35 LPGA of Japan tournaments, won one, had fifteen other top-10 finishes, ranked 4th in the Mercedes Rankings, and 6th in prize money, and thus earned her first priority seed.

Suga was selected as a member of the 6-member JLPGA team of the Hitachi 3Tours Championship (December 14), and her contribution to their victory of the game, shortened to half due to unplayable conditions, earned her an MVP. The JLPGA team was awarded a Special Award for their victory at the Hitachi 3Tours Championship.

Suga along with Yuna Araki were awarded the GTPA Rookie of the Year Award.

=== 2026 ===
At the Taiwan Foxconn Ladies Golf Tournament (12–15 March), the first co-sanctioned tournament with Taiwan LPGA Tour in 48 years and the first co-sanctioned tournament with a foreign country in 46 years, with strong winds gusting throughout the tournament to make the cut line +10, Suga overtook the lead on day three with the daily best score of −4, and increased her lead from 4 strokes to 6 with another daily best score of −3 on the final day to finish as the only player with an under par score, −5 (70-76-68-69), to win her second tournament.

Suga made her LPGA Tour major debut by qualifying for the U.S. Women's Open (4–7 June , The Riviera CC) via the category of the top 75 of Women's World Golf Rankings as of 24 March. She scored a +5 (75, 72) and missed the cut by one stroke.

At the Shiseido-JAL Ladies Open (2–5 July), she began the final round at −8 tied for fifth place, two strokes off the lead, and tied for the lead at −12 with a birdie on the 10th hole which eventually led to a seven-way tie for first place after regulation play. The seven-way playoff was the first in JLPGA history and her first-ever playoff appearance. However, she carded a bogey on the first playoff hole and had to settle for a second-place tie behind the winner, Ko Kurabayashi.

At the AIG Women's Open (30 July - 2 August, Royal Lytham & St Annes GC), Suga's second major tournament, she carded a score of +5 (73-74) and missed the cut by a single stroke, again.

== Professional wins (1) ==
=== LPGA of Japan Tour wins (2) ===
No.	Date	Tournament	Winning score	To par	Margin of victory	Runner(s)-up
1	28 Sep 2025	Miyagi TV Cup Dunlop Women's Open Golf Tournament	70-72-65=207	−9	2 strokes	(Japan) Lala Anai (Japan) Sora Kamiya
2	15 Mar 2026	Taiwan Foxconn Ladies Golf Tournament^{1}	70-76-68-69=283	−5	6 stroke	(Japan) Shuri Sakuma

^{1}Co-sanctioned by the Taiwan LPGA Tour

== Results in LPGA majors ==
Tournament	2026
Chevron Championship	
U.S. Women's Open	CUT
Women's PGA Championship	
The Evian Championship	
Women's British Open	CUT

Did not play

CUT = missed the half-way cut
T = tied

== World ranking ==
Position in Women's World Golf Rankings at the end of each calendar year.

Year	Ranking	Source
2024	219	
2025	80	
