= Kano Nakamura =

Japanese professional golfer (born 2001)

Kano Nakamura 仲村 果乃
Personal information
- Nationality: Japan
- Born: 3 July 2001 (age 25) Kyoto, Japan
- Height: 162 cm (5 ft 4 in)

Career
- Sport: Golf
- Turned professional: 2023
- Current tour: LPGA of Japan Tour
- Professional wins: 1

Number of wins by tour
- LPGA of Japan Tour: 1

Kano Nakamura (仲村 果乃, Nakamura Kano) (born 3 July 2001) is a Japanese professional golfer. She plays on the LPGA of Japan Tour where she has one win.

== Early life and amateur career ==
Nakamura began to play golf at the age of 11, due to her father's influence. She has received guidance from Nayoko Yoshikawa since her first year of high school.

She passed the JLPGA Player Certification Test on her fourth attempt, finishing in a 9th-place and became a member of the 95th class of the LPGA of Japan Tour as of 1 January 2023.

== Professional career ==
In August 2025, Nakamura signed an affiliation agreement with the Plenus.

In the 44th Hisako Higuchi Mitsubishi Electric Ladies Golf Tournament (31 October – 2 November 2025), she started the final day in 4th place. She recorded a 66, including 7 birdies and 1 bogey, and finished with a total score of −14, 2 strokes ahead of Yui Kawamoto, Wu Chia-yen and Miyuu Abe, to capture her maiden win on the LPGA of Japan Tour.

== Professional wins (1) ==
=== LPGA of Japan Tour wins (1) ===
No.	Date	Tournament	Winning score	To par	Margin of victory	Runner(s)-up
1	2 Nov 2025	Hisako Higuchi Mitsubishi Electric Ladies Golf Tournament	69-67-66=202	−14	2 strokes	(Japan) Miyuu Abe (Japan) Yui Kawamoto (Taiwan) Wu Chia-yen
