= Mei Fukuda (golfer) =

Japanese professional golfer (born 2006)

Mei Fukuda 福田 萌維
Personal information
- Nationality: Japan
- Born: 18 June 2006 (age 20) Iwade, Wakayama, Japan
- Height: 167 cm (5 ft 6 in)

Career
- Sport: Golf
- Turned professional: 2024
- Current tour: LPGA of Japan Tour
- Professional wins: 1

Number of wins by tour
- LPGA of Japan Tour: 1

Mei Fukuda (福田 萌維, Fukuda Mei) (born 18 June 2006) is a Japanese professional golfer. She has one win on the LPGA of Japan Tour.

== Early life and amateur career ==
Fukuda began to play golf at the age of 9, on the advice of the manager of youth baseball team she belonged to at the time.

She passed the JLPGA Player Certification Test on her first attempt, finishing in an 11th-place and became a member of the 97th class of the LPGA of Japan Tour as of 1 December 2024.

== Professional career ==
On 3 March 2025, it was announced that Fukuda had signed an affiliation agreement with the Nitori Co., Ltd.

In the 31st Golf 5 Ladies Professional Golf Tournament (4–6 September 2026), she started the final day in the sole lead. She recorded a 68, including 6 birdies and 1 double bogey, and finished with a total score of −15. She won the playoff against Megumi Kido to capture her maiden win on the LPGA of Japan Tour.

== Professional wins (1) ==
=== LPGA of Japan Tour wins (1) ===
No.	Date	Tournament	Winning score	To par	Margin of victory	Runner-up
1	6 Sep 2026	Golf 5 Ladies Professional Golf Tournament	60-67-68=201	−15	Playoff	(Japan) Megumi Kido
