= Hana Wakimoto =

Japanese professional golfer (born 1997)

Hana Wakimoto 脇元 華
Personal information
- Nationality: Japan
- Born: 4 October 1997 (age 29) Kobayashi, Miyazaki, Japan
- Height: 175 cm (5 ft 9 in)

Career
- Sport: Golf
- Turned professional: 2018
- Current tour: LPGA of Japan Tour
- Professional wins: 3

Number of wins by tour
- LPGA of Japan Tour: 1
- Other: 2

Hana Wakimoto (脇元 華, Wakimoto Hana) (born 4 October 1997) is a Japanese professional golfer. She plays on the LPGA of Japan Tour where she has one win.

== Early life and amateur career ==
Wakimoto began to play golf at the age of 8, at the suggestion of her father.

She won the 2018 Sampo Ladies Open on the Taiwan LPGA Tour.

She passed the JLPGA Player Certification Test on her third attempt, finishing in an 8th-place tie and became a member of the 90th class of the LPGA of Japan Tour as of 28 July 2018.

== Professional career ==
=== 2020 ===
In July, it was announced that Wakimoto had signed an affiliation agreement with the GMO Internet Group.

=== 2025 ===
In the 41st Ito En Ladies Golf Tournament (14–16 November), she started the final day in a tie for 8th place, 2 strokes behind the leader. She recorded the best score of the day with a 65, including 8 birdies, to take the sole lead, and finished with a total score of −16, 3 strokes ahead of Kana Nagai and Yumi Kudo playing in later groups, to capture her maiden win on the LPGA of Japan Tour.

== Professional wins (3) ==
=== LPGA of Japan Tour wins (1) ===
No.	Date	Tournament	Winning score	To par	Margin of victory	Runner(s)-up
1	16 Nov 2025	Ito En Ladies Golf Tournament	69-66-65=200	−16	3 strokes	(Japan) Kana Nagai (Japan) Yumi Kudo

=== Japan Step Up Tour wins (1) ===
- 2022 Hanasaka Ladies Yanmar Golf Tournament

=== Taiwan LPGA Tour wins (1) ===
No.	Date	Tournament	Winning score	To par	Margin of victory	Runner(s)-up
1	18 May 2018	Sampo Ladies Open		−2	2 strokes	(Japan) Mina Nakayama
