= Aihi Takano =

Japanese professional golfer (born 2004)

Aihi Takano 髙野 愛姫
Personal information
- Nationality: Japan
- Born: 14 September 2004 (age 22) Kita, Tokyo, Japan
- Height: 167 cm (5 ft 6 in)

Career
- Sport: Golf
- Turned professional: 2023
- Current tour: LPGA of Japan Tour
- Professional wins: 1

Number of wins by tour
- LPGA of Japan Tour: 1

Aihi Takano (髙野 愛姫, Takano Aihi) (born 14 September 2004) is a Japanese professional golfer. She plays on the LPGA of Japan Tour where she has one win.

== Career ==
Takano began to play golf at the age of 5, at the suggestion of her mother.

She passed the JLPGA Player Certification Test on her second attempt, finishing in a 12th-place tie and became a member of the 96th class of the LPGA of Japan Tour as of 1 December 2023.

In the 26th Yonex Ladies Golf Tournament (6–8 June 2025), she started the final day in a tie for 6th place, 4 strokes behind the leader. She recorded the best score of the day with a 64, including 9 birdies, to take the sole lead, and finished with a total score of −15, 4 strokes ahead of Lee Min-young, to capture her maiden win on the LPGA of Japan Tour.

== Professional wins (1) ==
=== LPGA of Japan Tour wins (1) ===
| No. | Date | Tournament | Winning score | To par | Margin of victory | Runner(s)-up |
|---|---|---|---|---|---|---|
| 1 | 8 Jun 2025 | Yonex Ladies Golf Tournament | 69-68-64=201 | −15 | 4 strokes | (South Korea) Lee Min-young |
