= Akie Iwai =

Japanese professional golfer (born 2002)

Akie Iwai 岩井 明愛
Personal information
- Nationality: Japan
- Born: 5 July 2002 (age 24) Saitama Prefecture, Japan
- Height: 161 cm (5 ft 3 in)

Career
- Sport: Golf
- Turned professional: 2021
- Current tours: LPGA of Japan Tour (joined 2021); LPGA Tour
- Professional wins: 10

Number of wins by tour
- LPGA Tour: 1
- LPGA of Japan Tour: 7
- Other: 2

Best results in LPGA major championships
- Chevron Championship: T21: 2026
- Women's PGA C'ship: T19: 2026
- U.S. Women's Open: T45: 2025, 2026
- Women's British Open: T7: 2024
- Evian Championship: 3rd: 2026

Akie Iwai (岩井 明愛, Iwai Akie) (born 5 July 2002) is a Japanese professional golfer. She plays on the LPGA Tour and on the LPGA of Japan Tour where she has 7 wins.

== Early life and amateur career ==
Iwai was born in Saitama Prefecture and started playing golf at 8 years old. In 2019, she won the Junior Golf World Cup.

== Professional career ==
Iwai turned professional and joined the LPGA of Japan Tour in 2021. As a rookie she won a title on the developmental circuit, the Step-Up tour, and the JLPGA Rookies Championship.

She had her breakthrough in 2023 when she won three titles and finished second on the money list.

In 2024, she finished top-10 in two LPGA majors, and rose to 26th in the Women's World Golf Rankings.

In December 2024, Iwai earned her LPGA Tour card for 2025 by finishing T-5 at the LPGA Final Qualifying Tournament.

== Personal life ==
Her twin sister, Chisato, is also a professional golfer on the LPGA of Japan Tour.

== Professional wins (10) ==
=== LPGA Tour (1) ===
No.	Date	Tournament	Winning score	To par	Margin of victory	Runner-up
1	17 Aug 2025	The Standard Portland Classic	67-67-64-66=264	−24	4 strokes	(United States) Gurleen Kaur

=== LPGA of Japan Tour wins (7) ===
No.	Date	Tournament	Winning score	To par	Margin of victory	Runner(s)-up
1	16 Apr 2023	KKT Cup Vantelin Ladies Open	67-70-72=209	−7	1 stroke	(Japan) Lala Anai (Japan) Mao Nozawa (South Korea) Jiyai Shin
2	17 Sep 2023	Sumitomo Life Vitality Ladies Tokai Classic	63-68-70=201	−15	1 stroke	(Japan) Sakura Koiwai
3	24 Sep 2023	Miyagi TV Cup Dunlop Women's Open Golf Tournament	65-69-69=203	−13	2 strokes	(Japan) Mao Saigo
4	26 May 2024	Resort Trust Ladies	68 68-69-68=273	−15	3 strokes	(Japan) Rio Takeda
5	16 Jun 2024	Nichirei Ladies	71-68-64=203	−13	1 stroke	(Japan) Sakura Koiwai (Japan) Shuri Sakuma
6	15 Sep 2024	Sumitomo Life Vitality Ladies Tokai Classic	70-66-64=200	−16	1 stroke	(Japan) Miyū Yamashita
7	11 Oct 2026	Stanley Ladies Honda Golf Tournament	67-66-67=200	−16	2 strokes	(Japan) Yui Kawamoto

=== Step-Up Tour wins (1) ===
No.	Date	Tournament	Winning score	To par	Margin of victory	Runner-up
1	19 Sep 2021	Sanyo Shimbun Ladies Cup	70-66=136^	−8	1 stroke	(Japan) Hanane Nagashima (a)

^Shortened to 36 holes due to weather

=== Other wins (1) ===
No.	Date	Tournament	Winning score	To par	Margin of victory	Runner-up
1	10 Dec 2021	JLPGA Rookies Championship Kaga Electronics Cup	69-71=140	−4	Playoff	(Japan) Kotoko Uchida

== Results in LPGA majors ==
Results not in chronological order.

Tournament	2023	2024	2025	2026
Chevron Championship		T30	T44	T21
U.S. Women's Open	CUT	74	T45	T45
Women's PGA Championship		T32	T29	T19
The Evian Championship		T10	CUT	3
Women's British Open	T11	T7	T40	T61

Top 10
Did not play

CUT = missed the half-way cut
"T" = tied

=== Summary ===
Tournament	Wins	2nd	3rd	Top-5	Top-10	Top-25	Events	Cuts made
Chevron Championship	0	0	0	0	0	1	3	3
U.S. Women's Open	0	0	0	0	0	0	4	3
Women's PGA Championship	0	0	0	0	0	1	3	3
The Evian Championship	0	0	1	1	2	2	3	2
Women's British Open	0	0	0	0	1	2	4	4
Totals	0	0	1	1	3	6	17	15

- Most consecutive cuts made – 9 (2023 Women's British – 2025 Women's PGA)
- Longest streak of top-10s – 2 (2024 Evian – 2024 Women's British)

== Team appearances ==
Amateur

- Junior Golf World Cup (representing Japan): 2019 (winners)

Professional

- Hitachi 3Tours Championship (representing JLPGA): 2023 (winners)
