= Riviera Maya Open =

Golf tournament

Tournament information
- Location: Playa del Carmen, Quintana Roo, Mexico
- Established: 2025
- Course: El Camaleón Golf Course
- Par: 72
- Length: 6,583 yards (6,019 m)
- Tour: LPGA Tour
- Format: 72 holes Stroke play
- Prize fund: US$2,500,000
- Month played: May

Tournament record score
- Aggregate: 276 Chisato Iwai
- To par: −12 as above

Current champion
- (United States) Nelly Korda

Location map
- Location in Mexico Location in Quintana Roo

The México Riviera Maya Open at Mayakoba is a women's professional golf tournament on the LPGA Tour held at El Camaleón Golf Course at Mayakoba in Playa del Carmen, Quintana Roo, Mexico.

== History ==
The inaugural year for the event was 2025, which hosts a field of 144 players, and marked the LPGA Tour's return to Mexico for the first time since 2017.

== Winners ==
Year	Date	Champion	Country	Score	To par	Margin of victory	Runner-up	Purse ($)	Winner's share
2026	May 3	Nelly Korda	United States	68-67-67-69=271	–17	4 strokes	(Thailand) Arpichaya Yubol	2,500,000	375,000
2025	May 25	Chisato Iwai	Japan	68-74-68-66=276	−12	6 strokes	(United States) Jenny Bae	2,500,000	375,000
