= Ai Suzuki =

Japanese professional golfer (born 1994)

Personal information
- Nationality: Japan
- Born: 9 May 1994 (age 32) Miyoshi District, Tokushima, Japan
- Height: 155 cm (5 ft 1 in)

Career
- Sport: Golf
- Turned professional: 2013
- Current tour: LPGA of Japan Tour
- Professional wins: 25

Number of wins by tour
- LPGA Tour: 1
- LPGA of Japan Tour: 23
- Other: 2

Best results in LPGA major championships
- Chevron Championship: 76th: 2018
- Women's PGA C'ship: DNP
- U.S. Women's Open: T22: 2019
- Women's British Open: T14: 2017
- Evian Championship: T55: 2019

Achievements and awards
- LPGA of Japan Tour Player of the Year: 2017
- LPGA of Japan Tour leading money winner: 2017, 2019

Ai Suzuki (born 9 May 1994) is a Japanese professional golfer.

Suzuki plays on the LPGA of Japan Tour where she has won 22 times including 7 times in 2019. In November 2019, she won three consecutive tournaments, including the Toto Japan Classic, which was co-sanctioned by the LPGA Tour.

Suzuki led the LPGA of Japan Tour money list in 2017 and 2019.

== Professional wins (25) ==
=== LPGA of Japan Tour wins (23) ===
No.	Date	Tournament	Winning score	To par	Margin of victory	Runner(s)-up
1	14 Sep 2014	**Japan LPGA Championship Konica Minolta Cup**	70-67-75-71=283	−5	1 stroke	(Japan) Lala Anai (South Korea) Lee Na-ri (Japan) Misuzu Narita (South Korea) Jiyai Shin
2	22 May 2016	Chukyo TV Bridgestone Ladies Open	67-68-72=207	−9	Playoff	(Japan) Asako Fujimoto (Japan) Miki Uehara
3	11 Sep 2016	**Japan LPGA Championship Konica Minolta Cup**	73-72-75-69=289	+1	1 stroke	(Japan) Shiho Oyama (Japan) Megumi Shimokawa
4	14 May 2017	Hoken No Madoguchi Ladies	70-67-72=209	−7	2 strokes	(South Korea) Lee Min-young
5	25 Jun 2017	Earth Mondahmin Cup	68-66-67-69=270	−18	1 stroke	(Japan) Kana Mikashima
6	18 Mar 2018	T-Point Ladies Golf Tournament	65-69=134	−8	1 stroke	(South Korea) Jeon Mi-jeong
7	8 Apr 2018	Studio Alice Women's Open	67-69-70=206	−10	4 strokes	(Japan) Rumi Yoshiba
8	13 May 2018	Hoken No Madoguchi Ladies	68-68-72=208	−8	1 stroke	(South Korea) Ahn Sun-ju (Japan) Erika Kikuchi
9	17 Jun 2018	Nichirei Ladies	69-70-68=207	−9	Playoff	(Taiwan) Teresa Lu (South Korea) Jiyai Shin
10	17 Mar 2019	Yokohama Tire Golf Tournament PRGR Ladies Cup	69-70-68=207	−9	4 strokes	(Japan) Rumi Yoshiba
11	16 Jun 2019	Ai Miyazato Suntory Ladies Open Golf Tournament	67-68-71-70=276	−12	1 stroke	(Japan) Mamiko Higa
12	23 Jun 2019	Nichirei Ladies	70-67-70=207	−9	Playoff	(Japan) Sayaka Takahashi
13	1 Sep 2019	Nitori Ladies Golf Tournament	70-67-71-69=277	−11	2 strokes	(South Korea) Ahn Sun-ju (South Korea) Jiyai Shin
14	3 Nov 2019	Hisako Higuchi Mitsubishi Electric Ladies Golf Tournament	66-68-68=202	−14	1 stroke	(South Korea) Jiyai Shin
15	10 Nov 2019	Toto Japan Classic**^{a}**	67-65-67=199	−17	3 strokes	(South Korea) Kim Hyo-joo
16	17 Nov 2019	Ito En Ladies Golf Tournament	68-67-67=202	−14	1 stroke	(Japan) Shiho Oyama
17	4 Jul 2021	Shiseido Ladies Open	66-68=134	−10	1 stroke	(Japan) Minami Katsu (Japan) Mao Saigo
18	6 Aug 2023	Hokkaido Meiji Cup	66-68-67=201	−15	3 strokes	(Japan) Shiho Kuwaki
19	10 Mar 2024	Meiji Yasuda Ladies Yokohama Tire Golf Tournament	65-70-67-70=272	−16	6 strokes	(Japan) Sayaka Takahashi (Japan) Sakura Koiwai (Japan) Karen Fujita
20	17 Mar 2024	V-Point-ENEOS Golf Tournament	68-69-33=170	−10	Playoff	(Japan) Sakura Koiwai
21	31 Aug 2025	Nitori Ladies Golf Tournament	70-71-71-68=280	−12	2 strokes	(Japan) Shina Kanazawa (Japan) Mizuki Ooide
22	30 Nov 2025	**Japan LPGA Tour Championship**	70-69-71-69=279	−9	Playoff	(Japan) Chisato Iwai
23	18 Oct 2026	Fujitsu Ladies	68-67-69-69=273	−15	2 strokes	(Japan) Nana Suganuma

Tournaments in bold denotes major tournaments in LPGA of Japan Tour.
^{a} Co-sanctioned by the LPGA Tour.

=== LPGA Tour wins (1) ===
Legend
Major championships (0)
Other LPGA Tour (1)

No.	Date	Tournament	Winning score	To par	Margin of victory	Runner-up
1	8 Nov 2019	Toto Japan Classic**^{a}**	67-65-67=199	−17	3 strokes	(South Korea) Kim Hyo-joo

^{a} Co-sanctioned by the LPGA of Japan Tour.

=== JLPGA Step up Tour (2) ===
- 2013 (1) Chugoku Shimbun Chupea Ladies Cup
- 2014 (1) Rashinkin Ninjineer/RKB Ladies

== Results in LPGA majors ==
Results not in chronological order before 2019.

Tournament	2015	2016	2017	2018	2019	2020	2021	2022	2023	2024	2025	2026
Chevron Championship				76								
U.S. Women's Open	T32		CUT	CUT	T22			WD		T67	CUT	CUT
Women's PGA Championship												
The Evian Championship					T55	NT						
Women's British Open		T65	T14		CUT					CUT		

Did not play

CUT = missed the half-way cut
WD = withdrew
NT = no tournament
T = tied

=== Summary ===
Tournament	Wins	2nd	3rd	Top-5	Top-10	Top-25	Events	Cuts made
Chevron Championship	0	0	0	0	0	0	1	1
U.S. Women's Open	0	0	0	0	0	1	8	3
Women's PGA Championship	0	0	0	0	0	0	0	0
The Evian Championship	0	0	0	0	0	0	1	1
Women's British Open	0	0	0	0	0	1	4	2
Totals	0	0	0	0	0	2	14	7

- Most consecutive cuts made – 2 (three times)
- Longest streak of top-10s – 0

== Team appearances ==
- The Queens (representing Japan): 2016
- International Crown (representing Japan): 2016
