= Reina Kato =

Japanese professional golfer (born 2007)

Reina Kato 加藤 麗奈
Personal information
- Nationality: Japan
- Born: 5 March 2007 (age 19) Sanda, Hyōgo, Japan
- Height: 157 cm (5 ft 2 in)

Career
- Sport: Golf
- Turned professional: 2024
- Current tour: LPGA of Japan Tour
- Professional wins: 1

Number of wins by tour
- LPGA of Japan Tour: 1

Reina Kato (加藤 麗奈, Kato Reina) (born 5 March 2007) is a Japanese professional golfer. She has won her first LPGA of Japan Tour event in 2026.

== Early life and amateur career ==
Kato began to play golf at the age of 10, due to her parents' influence.

She passed the JLPGA Player Certification Test in 2024 and joined the tour as a member of its 97th class.

== Professional career ==
In the 11th Daito Kentaku Eheyanet Ladies (23–26 July 2026), she started the final day in the sole lead. She recorded a 68, including 5 birdies and 1 bogey, and finished with a total score of −22, 1 stroke ahead of Asuka Minayoshi, Sumika Nakasone, to capture her maiden win on the LPGA of Japan Tour.

== Professional wins (1) ==
=== LPGA of Japan Tour wins (1) ===
No.	Date	Tournament	Winning score	To par	Margin of victory	Runner-up
1	26 Jul 2026	Daito Kentaku Eheyanet Ladies	67-64-67-68=266	−22	1 stroke	(Japan) Asuka Minayoshi (Japan) Sumika Nakasone
