= Kiara Romero =

American professional golfer (born 2006)

Personal information
- Nationality: United States
- Born: March 7, 2006 (age 20) New York, U.S.

Career
- Sport: Golf
- College: University of Oregon
- Turned professional: 2026
- Current tour: LPGA Tour

Best results in LPGA major championships
- Chevron Championship: CUT: 2026
- Women's PGA C'ship: DNP
- U.S. Women's Open: T6: 2026
- Women's British Open: CUT: 2026
- Evian Championship: CUT: 2026

Achievements and awards
- Mark H. McCormack Medal: 2025, 2026

Kiara Romero (born March 7, 2006) is an American professional golfer. Romero won the 2023 U.S. Girls' Junior before signing to play collegiate golf at the University of Oregon. Romero was named first team all-American for her freshman and sophomore seasons. Romero made her debut on the LPGA Tour at the 2024 U.S. Women's Open. She became the top-ranked amateur golfer in the World Amateur Golf Ranking in July 2025 and held the position until she turned professional in August 2026.

== Early life ==
Romero was born on March 7, 2006, in New York. As a child she trained at the Joffrey Ballet School in Jazz and Contemporary dance. She later moved to San Jose, California. Romero completed her high school education online in three years.

== Amateur career ==
In 2021, Romero won the AJGA's Polo Golf Junior Classic. By 2023, Romero had been named a four time Rolex Junior All-American. In 2023, Romero won the U.S. Girls' Junior. That year, she was ranked #1 in her class by Golfweek.

Romero was recruited by the University of Oregon and won her first collegiate tournament shortly after, the 2023 Annika Intercollegiate. In 2024, she won the San Diego State Classic. During her freshman season, she was named the National freshman of the year and a first team all-American. In 2024, she was named to the Arnold Palmer Cup team. Her win in the U.S. Girls' Junior earned her entry into the 2024 U.S. Women's Open, but she missed the cut.

In 2025, Romero finished first in the Big Ten Women's Golf Championships and the NCAA Gold Canyon Regionals. During the 2025 NCAA Gold Canyon Regional, Romero shot the lowest recorded score in Oregon golf history. At the conclusion of her sophomore season, she was named a first-team all-American by the Women's Golf Coaches Association for the second year in a row. She was additionally named the 2025 Big Ten Women's Golfer of the Year. Romero concluded her sophomore year as the second ranked college player and third ranked amateur golfer.

In 2025, Romero placed in the top-10 in the Augusta National Women's Amateur, after leading the field through the final day. In May, Romero earned a berth to compete at the 2025 U.S. Women's Open after qualifying during a tournament at the Arrowhead Golf Club in Molalla, Oregon. During the Open tournament, Romero made the cut after the second round. On the final day of the tournament, she posted a 5-under par score, the lowest final round score ever by an amateur in Open history.

In 2026, Romero finished tied for 6th and was the low amateur at the 2026 U.S. Women's Open.

== Professional career ==
Romero turned professional in August 2026 after earning LPGA Tour membership through LPGA Elite Amateur Pathway (LEAP). Her first event as a pro was the CPKC Women's Open, where she shot 64 in the first round.

== Amateur wins ==
- 2021 Polo Golf Junior Classic, California Junior Championship
- 2023 U.S. Girls' Junior, Annika Intercollegiate
- 2024 San Diego State Classic
- 2025 Big Ten Women's Golf Championships, NCAA Gold Canyon Regional
- 2026 Chevron Collegiate, Charles Schwab Women's Collegiate

== Results in LPGA majors ==
| Tournament | 2025 | 2026 |
|---|---|---|
| Chevron Championship | | CUT |
| U.S. Women's Open | T45 | T6LA |
| Women's PGA Championship | | |
| The Evian Championship | | CUT |
| Women's British Open | | CUT |

Top 10
Did not play

LA = low amateur
CUT = missed the half-way cut
T= tied

== U.S. national team appearances ==
- Arnold Palmer Cup: 2024 (winners), 2025, 2026
- Curtis Cup: 2026 (winners)
