= Ko Kurabayashi =

Japanese professional golfer (born 2005)

Ko Kurabayashi 倉林 紅
Personal information
- Nationality: Japan
- Born: 29 June 2005 (age 21) Tomiya, Miyagi, Japan
- Height: 164 cm (5 ft 5 in)

Career
- Sport: Golf
- Turned professional: 2025
- Current tour: LPGA of Japan Tour
- Professional wins: 1

Number of wins by tour
- LPGA of Japan Tour: 1

Ko Kurabayashi (倉林 紅, Kurabayashi Ko) (born 29 June 2005) is a Japanese professional golfer. She won one time on the LPGA of Japan Tour.

== Early life and amateur career ==
Kurabayashi began to play golf at the age of 6, due to her older brother's influence.

She passed the JLPGA Player Certification Test on her third attempt, finishing in a 4th-place and became a member of the 98th class of the LPGA of Japan Tour as of 1 December 2025.

== Professional career ==
In the 2026 Shiseido-JAL Ladies Open (2–5 July), she started the final day in 9th-place. She recorded a 68, including 7 birdies and 2 bogeys, and finished with a total score of −12. She then won a 7-player playoff to capture her maiden win on the LPGA of Japan Tour. The first round was canceled due to bad weather, and the tournament was played as a 54-hole shortened event over three days.

== Professional wins (1) ==
=== LPGA of Japan Tour wins (1) ===
No.	Date	Tournament	Winning score	To par	Margin of victory	Runner-up
1	5 Jul 2026	Shiseido-JAL Ladies Open	68-69-67=208	−12	Playoff	(Japan) Momoka Kamiya (Japan) Meg Maeda (Japan) Misaki Miyazawa (Japan) Kana Nagai (Japan) Aira Nagasawa (a) (Japan) Fuka Suga
