= Nana Suganuma =

Japanese professional golfer (born 2000)

Nana Suganuma 菅沼 菜々
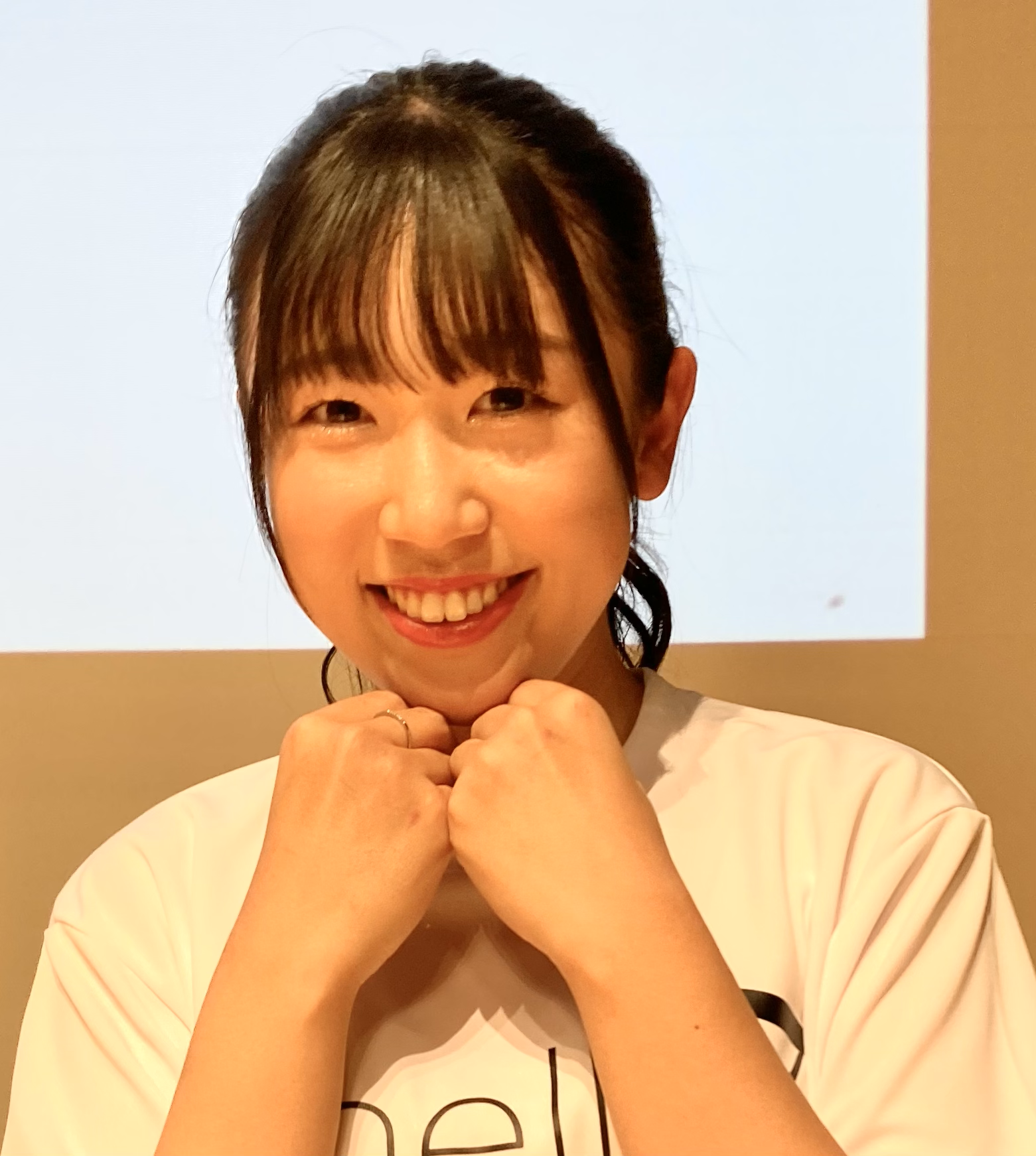
- February 2025

Personal information
- Nationality: Japan
- Born: 10 February 2000 (age 26) Tachikawa, Tokyo, Japan
- Height: 158 cm (5 ft 2 in)

Career
- Sport: Golf
- Turned professional: 2018
- Current tour: LPGA of Japan Tour
- Professional wins: 4

Number of wins by tour
- LPGA of Japan Tour: 4

Nana Suganuma (菅沼 菜々, Suganuma Nana) (born 10 February 2000) is a Japanese professional golfer. She plays on the LPGA of Japan Tour where she has four wins.

== Career ==
She captured the 2023 NEC Karuizawa 72 for her maiden win on the JLPGA.

== Personal life ==
In 2020, Suganuma announced that she had suffered from agoraphobia since the summer 2016. She stated that she had been trying to treat with counseling and natural therapy, because medication could result in violating doping regulations.

== Professional wins (4) ==
=== LPGA of Japan Tour wins (4) ===
No.	Date	Tournament	Winning score	To par	Margin of victory	Runner(s)-up
1	23 Aug 2023	NEC Karuizawa 72	66-65-69=200	−16	Playoff	(Japan) Sora Kamiya
2	10 Oct 2023	Masters GC Ladies	68-65-71-70=274	−14	3 strokes	(Japan) Mami Fukuda (Japan) Amiyu Ozeki (Japan) Miyū Yamashita
3	4 May 2025	Panasonic Open Ladies Golf Tournament	71-66-69=200	−10	1 stroke	(Japan) Momoko Osato
4	3 May 2026	NTT docomo Business Ladies	65-67-66=198	−18	5 strokes	(Japan) Yuna Araki
