= Shiseido Ladies Open =

The Shiseido Ladies Open is an annual golf tournament on the LPGA of Japan Tour sponsored by Shiseido and Shiseido Japan. It was first played in 2019. The event is held in the first week of July in Kanagawa. The first event was hosted by Totsuka Country Club. The prize fund for 2019 was ¥120,000,000 with ¥21,600,000 going to the winner. Anessa is Shiseido's brand for its skincare products.

== Winners ==
- 2026 Ko Kurabayashi
- 2025 Saki Nagamine
- 2024 Shiho Kuwaki
- 2023 Kokona Sakurai
- 2022 Serena Aoki
- 2021 Ai Suzuki
- 2020 Cancelled
- 2019 Hinako Shibuno
