= Yui Kawamoto =

Japanese professional golfer (born 1998)

Personal information
- Nationality: Japan
- Born: 29 August 1998 (age 28) Matsuyama, Ehime Prefecture, Japan
- Height: 163 cm (5 ft 4 in)

Career
- Sport: Golf
- College: Nippon Sport Science University
- Turned professional: 2018
- Current tour: LPGA of Japan Tour
- Former tour: LPGA Tour
- Professional wins: 10

Number of wins by tour
- LPGA of Japan Tour: 6
- Other: 4

Best results in LPGA major championships
- Chevron Championship: T28: 2021
- Women's PGA C'ship: T48: 2020
- U.S. Women's Open: T36: 2025
- Women's British Open: T29: 2024
- Evian Championship: DNP

YouTube information
- Channel: yuikawamoto1054
- Subscribers: 197 thousand
- Views: 21 million
- Last updated: 12 June 2025

Yui Kawamoto (Japanese: 河本 結, romanized: Kawamoto Yui, born 29 August 1998) is a Japanese professional golfer who plays on the LPGA of Japan Tour. Kawamoto turned professional in 2018, and made her LPGA Tour debut in 2020. In addition to golf, Kawamoto is known for her fashion sense, YouTube channel, and distinctive hair ribbons worn while playing.

== Early life and amateur career ==
Kawamoto was born on 29 August 1998 in Matsuyama. Kawamoto would later become recognized as part of a "golden generation" of Japanese golfers all born in 1998 to become professionals, including Hinako Shibuno, Sakura Koiwai, and Nasa Hataoka. Kawamoto began playing golf at age 5. As an amateur player, Kawamoto won the 2013 Shikoku Junior Golf Championship, the Shikoku Women's Amateur Golf Championship.

== Professional career ==
In 2018, Kawamoto turned professional, joining the Step Up Tour, where she would finish the season ranked first in prize money. She then joined the LPGA of Japan Tour. In March 2019, she recorded her first professional victory, in the AXA Ladies Tournament, during her rookie season. During the tournament, her brother Riki Kawamoto served as her caddie.

In 2020, Kawamoto made her debut on the LPGA Tour. In the 2020 U.S. Women's Open, Kawamoto placed 60th in her first appearance at the event. In 2021, she withdrew from the LPGA Tour and returned to competition on the LPGA of Japan Tour where she continues to play.

During the 2024 LPGA of Japan Tour, Kawamoto won the NEC Karuizawa 72 Golf Tournament and placed second at the Hokkaido Meiji Cup and Stanley Ladies Honda events. That year she again qualified for the U.S. Open, where she again made the cut and placed T39.

In 2025, Kawamoto played in the U.S. Women's Open for the third time. There, she recorded her highest result in the event, T36.

== Personal life ==
=== Fashion ===
On and off the tour, Kawamoto is known for her style. On tour, Kawamoto wears trademark hair ribbons while playing. Kawamoto regularly themes her hair ribbons for events, with yellow being a trademark, and red being a favorite to honor her sponsors Ricoh and for Tiger Woods. In 2022, she wore purple ribbons to support the Campaign to Eliminate Violence Against Women. Kawamoto brings about 20 colors of ribbons to events, where they are sponsored by Kosé.

Prior to her appearance at the 2025 U.S. Women's Open, her Sanrio themed golf bag with Hello Kitty club covers was shared with her followers. At the SkyRKB Ladies event, Kawamoto won the Best Dresser Award, winning 200,000 yen. On tour in 2025, Kawamoto gained attention by wearing a shirt with a Darth Vader motif on it while competing on day 3 of the Miyazato Ai Suntory Ladies Tournament. Kawamoto finished the day 2T. The Star Wars motif was worn in solidarity with her brother, Riki Kawamoto, who was concurrently playing in the first round of the U.S. Open, while wearing a golf shirt emblazoned with a stormtrooper.

=== YouTube ===
On 20 May 2020, Kawamoto launched a YouTube channel where she shares golf tips, advice and English learning. As of 2025, the channel has more than 197,000 subscribers.

== Professional wins (10) ==
=== LPGA of Japan Tour wins (6) ===
| No. | Date | Tournament | Winning score | To par | Margin of victory | Runners-up |
|---|---|---|---|---|---|---|
| 1 | 31 Mar 2019 | AXA Ladies Golf Tournament in Miyazaki | 66-65-70=201 | −15 | 5 strokes | (Thailand) Saranporn Langkulgasettrin (South Korea) Yoon Chae-young |
| 2 | 11 Aug 2024 | NEC Karuizawa 72 | 66-66-73=205 | −11 | 1 stroke | (Japan) Kotone Hori (Japan) Sakura Koiwai (Japan) Yumeno Masada |
| 3 | 10 Aug 2025 | Hokkaido Meiji Cup | 71-68-68=207 | −9 | 1 stroke | (China) Haruka Morita-WanyaoLu (Japan) Karen Tsuruoka |
| 4 | 12 Oct 2025 | Stanley Ladies Honda Golf Tournament | 65-69-32=166 | −14 | 3 strokes | (Japan) Chisato Iwai |
| 5 | 10 May 2026 | **World Ladies Championship Salonpas Cup** | 72-71-76-70=289 | +1 | 2 strokes | (Japan) Ai Suzuki |
| 6 | 31May 2026 | Resort Trust Ladies | 71-69-70-68=278 | −10 | Playoff | (Japan) Yuzuki Yoshizawa |

Tournaments in bold denotes major tournaments in LPGA of Japan Tour.

=== Japan Step Up Tour wins (4) ===
- 2018 Sky Ladies ABC Cup, Sanyoshimbun Ladies Cup, Fundokin Ladies, Udon-Ken Ladies

== Results in LPGA majors ==
Results not in chronological order.

| Tournament | 2020 | 2021 | 2022 | 2023 | 2024 | 2025 | 2026 |
|---|---|---|---|---|---|---|---|
| Chevron Championship | T69 | T28 | | | | | |
| U.S. Women's Open | 60 | | | | T39 | T36 | CUT |
| Women's PGA Championship | T48 | | | | | CUT | |
| The Evian Championship | NT | | | | | | |
| Women's British Open | CUT | | | | T29 | | |

Did not play

CUT = missed the half-way cut
NT = no tournament
T = tied
