= Sakura Koiwai =

Japanese professional golfer

Sakura Koiwai 小祝 さくら
Personal information
- Nationality: Japan
- Born: 15 April 1998 (age 28) Kitahiroshima, Hokkaido, Japan
- Height: 158 cm (5 ft 2 in)

Career
- Sport: Golf
- Turned professional: 2017
- Current tour: LPGA of Japan Tour (joined 2017)
- Professional wins: 12

Number of wins by tour
- LPGA of Japan Tour: 12

Best results in LPGA major championships
- Chevron Championship: DNP
- Women's PGA C'ship: DNP
- U.S. Women's Open: T9: 2024
- Women's British Open: CUT: 2024
- Evian Championship: DNP

Achievements and awards
- JLPGA Rookie of the Year: 2018
- Japan Professional Sports Rookie of the Year: 2018

Sakura Koiwai (小祝 さくら, Koiwai Sakura) (born 15 April 1998) is a Japanese professional golfer. She plays on the LPGA of Japan Tour where she has 12 victories.

== Career ==
Koiwai was born in Kitahiroshima, Hokkaido in 1998 and started playing golf when she was 8 years old. She won the Hokkaido Amateur Championship in 2014 and 2016.

Koiwai turned professional and joined the LPGA of Japan Tour in 2017. In 2018, she recorded four runner-up finishes to rank 8th on the money list, and won the PGA Rookie of the Year award and the Japan Professional Sports Rookie of the Year award.

She captured the 2019 Samantha Thavasa Girls Collection Ladies Tournament for her maiden win on the JLPGA. Her lone victory in 2020 was the Golf5 Ladies.

In 2021, Koiwai recorded four wins and three second-place finishes, to finish 3rd on the 2020–21 money list with over 200 million yen in season earnings.

In mid-2021, she rose into the top-50 in the Women's World Golf Rankings for the first time.

== Amateur wins ==
- 2014 Hokkaido Amateur Championship
- 2016 Hokkaido Amateur Championship

== Professional wins (12) ==
=== LPGA of Japan Tour wins (12) ===
No.	Date	Tournament	Winning score	To par	Margin of victory	Runner(s)-up
1	21 Jul 2019	Samantha Thavasa Girls Collection Ladies Tournament	66-68-65=199	−17	1 stroke	(South Korea) Lee Min-young2
2	6 Sep 2020	Golf5 Ladies	68-65-66=199	−17	6 strokes	(Japan) Ayaka Furue (Japan) Ayake Watanabe
3	7 Mar 2021	Daikin Orchid Ladies Golf Tournament	71-69-66-68=274	−14	1 stroke	(China) Haruka Morita-WanyaoLu
4	21 Mar 2021	T-Point ENEOS Golf Tournament	68-68-70=206	−10	2 strokes	(South Korea) Bae Seon-woo (Japan) Ai Suzuki (Taiwan) Tsai Pei-ying
5	15 Aug 2021	NEC Karuizawa 72 Golf Tournament	64-34=98^	−10	2 strokes	(Taiwan) Tsai Pei-ying
6	22 Aug 2021	CAT Ladies	68-70-71=209	−7	2 strokes	(Japan) Mone Inami (Japan) Kana Mikashima (Japan) Sayaka Takahashi
7	29 May 2022	Resort Trust Ladies	69-67-64-71=271	−17	2 strokes	(Japan) Nana Suganuma (Taiwan) Tsai Pei-ying
8	9 Oct 2022	Stanley Ladies Honda Golf Tournament	67-67-70=204	−17	1 stroke	(Japan) Kana Nagai (Japan) Mao Saigo (Japan) Nana Suganuma
9	9 Jul 2023	MinebeaMitsumi Ladies Hokkaido Shimbun Cup	69-68-68-71=276	−12	3 strokes	(Japan) Lala Anai (Japan) Erika Kikuchi
10	31 Mar 2024	Yamaha Ladies Open Katsuragi	66-73-67=206	−10	1 stroke	(Japan) Chisato Iwai (Japan) Rio Takeda
11	23 Jun 2024	Earth Mondahmin Cup	70-66-65-71=272	−16	3 strokes	(Japan) Yuka Yasuda
12	20 Jul 2025	Meiji Yasuda Ladies Golf Tournament	66-69-66=201	−15	1 stroke	(Japan) Yui Kawamoto (Japan) Hanane Nagashima (Japan) Kano Nakamura (Japan) Miyu Sato

^Tournament shortened due to adverse conditions.

== Results in LPGA majors ==
Tournament	2024	2025	2026
Chevron Championship			
U.S. Women's Open	T9	T45	T60
Women's PGA Championship			
The Evian Championship			
Women's British Open	CUT		

Top 10
Did not play

CUT = missed the half-way cut
"T" = tied
