= Masters GC Ladies =

Nobuta Group Masters GC Ladies
Tournament information
- Location: Miki, Hyōgo
- Established: 2003
- Course: Masters Golf Club
- Par: 72
- Length: 6,585 yards (6,021 m)
- Organized by: IMG
- Tour: LPGA of Japan Tour
- Format: Stroke play
- Prize fund: ¥200,000,000
- Month played: October

Current champion
- (Japan) Shiho Kuwaki

Nobuta Group Masters GC Ladies is an annual golf tournament for professional female golfers on LPGA of Japan Tour. It is usually played in October and in recent years at the Masters Golf Club, Miki, Hyogo. It was founded in 2003.

== Winners ==
- 2026 (Japan) Shiho Kuwaki
- 2025 (Japan) Shuri Sakuma
- 2024 (South Korea) Lee Min-young
- 2023 (Japan) Nana Suganuma
- 2022 (Japan) Haruka Kawasaki
- 2021 (Japan) Ayaka Furue
- 2020 Cancelled
- 2019 (Japan) Asuka Kashiwabara
- 2018 (South Korea) Ahn Sun-ju
- 2017 (Japan) Momoko Ueda
- 2016 (South Korea) Jeon Mi-jeong
- 2015 (South Korea) Lee Ji-hee
- 2014 (Japan) Shiho Oyama
- 2013 (Japan) Sakura Yokomine
- 2012 (South Korea) So-hee Kim
- 2011 (Japan) Shiho Oyama
- 2010 (Japan) Sakura Yokomine
- 2009 (South Korea) Jiyai Shin
- 2008 (Japan) Shiho Oyama
- 2007 (Japan) Miho Koga
- 2006 (Japan) Miho Koga
- 2005 (United States) Paula Creamer
- 2004 (Japan) Ai Miyazato
- 2003 (Japan) Hiromi Takesue
