= Yuri Yoshida =

Japanese professional golfer (born 2000)

Yuri Yoshida 吉田 優利
Personal information
- Nationality: Japan
- Born: 17 April 2000 (age 26) Ichikawa, Chiba, Japan
- Height: 158 cm (5 ft 2 in)

Career
- Sport: Golf
- College: Japan Wellness Sports University
- Turned professional: 2019
- Current tours: LPGA Tour (joined 2024); LPGA of Japan Tour (joined 2020)
- Professional wins: 5

Number of wins by tour
- LPGA Tour: 1
- LPGA of Japan Tour: 4

Best results in LPGA major championships
- Chevron Championship: T38: 2026
- Women's PGA C'ship: CUT: 2025, 2026
- U.S. Women's Open: T28: 2026
- Women's British Open: CUT: 2023
- Evian Championship: T21: 2025

Yuri Yoshida (吉田優利, Yoshida Yuri) (born 17 April 2000) is a Japanese professional golfer and LPGA Tour player. She won four times on the LPGA of Japan Tour.

== Early life and amateur career ==
Yoshida had a successful amateur career and in 2018 she won both the Japan Junior Championship and the Japan Women's Amateur Championship. In 2019, she was medalist at the Australian Women's Amateur.

She represented Japan internationally, and led her team to a runner-up finish behind the United States at the 2018 Espirito Santo Trophy in Ireland, where she finished third individually behind Cho Ayean and Jennifer Kupcho.

== Professional career ==
Yoshida turned professional in late 2019 and joined the 2020 LPGA of Japan Tour. She won twice on the 2020–21 LPGA of Japan Tour season, and rose to a Women's World Golf Rankings of 77 by September 2021. In 2023, she won the World Ladies Championship Salonpas Cup, one of the four majors of the JLPGA.

Yoshida earned her card for the 2024 LPGA Tour through qualifying school, where she tied for 7th.

== Personal life ==
Her younger sister, Rin is also a professional golfer on the LPGA of Japan Tour.

== Amateur wins ==
- 2017 Kanto Amateur Championship, Aaron Baddeley International Junior Championship
- 2018 Japan Women's Amateur Championship, Japan Junior Championship

== Professional wins (5) ==
=== LPGA Tour wins (1) ===
No.	Date	Tournament	Winning score	To par	Margin of victory	Runners-up
1	25 Oct 2026	BMW Ladies Championship	66-69-68-68=271	−17	1 stroke	(South Korea) Choi Hye-jin (South Korea) Ryu Hae-ran

=== LPGA of Japan Tour wins (4) ===
No.	Date	Tournament	Winning score	To par	Margin of victory	Runner-up
1	31 Jul 2021	Rakuten Super Ladies	65-67-66=198	−18	3 stroke	(Japan) Mamiko Higa
2	5 Sep 2021	Golf5 Ladies	69-68-65=202	−14	Playoff	(Japan) Eri Okayama
3	7 May 2023	**World Ladies Championship Salonpas Cup**	71-69-76-73=289	+1	3 strokes	(South Korea) Jiyai Shin
4	23 Mar 2025	V Point-SMBC Ladies Golf Tournament	68-64-71=203	−13	9 strokes	(Japan) Fuka Suga

Tournaments in bold denotes major tournaments in LPGA of Japan Tour.

== Results in LPGA majors ==
Results not in chronological order.

Tournament	2019	2020	2021	2022	2023	2024	2025	2026
Chevron Championship							T40	T38
U.S. Women's Open	CUT				CUT	T51		T28
Women's PGA Championship							CUT	CUT
The Evian Championship		NT					T21	CUT
Women's British Open					CUT		T58	

Did not play

CUT = missed the half-way cut
NT = no tournament
T = tied

== Team appearances ==
Amateur

- Espirito Santo Trophy (representing Japan): 2018
- Queen Sirikit Cup (representing Japan): 2019
