= Shiho Kuwaki =

Japanese professional golfer (born 2003)

Personal information
- Nationality: Japan
- Born: 29 January 2003 (age 23) Okayama, Japan
- Height: 163 cm (5 ft 4 in)

Career
- Sport: Golf
- College: Kurashiki University of Science and the Arts
- Turned professional: 2021
- Current tour: LPGA of Japan Tour
- Professional wins: 10

Number of wins by tour
- LPGA Tour: 1
- Ladies European Tour: 1
- LPGA of Japan Tour: 8
- Other: 1

Best results in LPGA major championships
- Chevron Championship: DNP
- Women's PGA C'ship: T24: 2026
- U.S. Women's Open: T14: 2026
- Women's British Open: Won: 2026
- Evian Championship: T41: 2026

Shiho Kuwaki (Japanese: 桑木 志帆, born 29 January 2003) is a Japanese professional golfer. Kuwaki turned professional in 2021, joining the LPGA of Japan Tour. In 2024, she won the Japan LPGA Tour Championship Ricoh Cup. On 2 August 2026, she won the Women's British Open to claim her first major title following a playoff with Germany's Esther Henseleit. Kuwaki is noted in the Japanese press for her distinctive fashion on tour.

== Early life and amateur career ==
Kuwaki was born on 29 January 2003 in Okayama City, Okayama Prefecture. Kuwaki began playing golf at age four. During junior high school, she won the China Women's Amateur Golf Championship. In high school, she won The One Junior Golf Tournament. Kuwaki is a student at Kurashiki University of Science and the Arts.

== Professional career ==
Kuwaki turned professional in 2021. That year, she won the JLPTGA Rookies Championship Kaga Electronics Cup.

In 2023, Kuwaki came in second at the Shiseido Ladies Open after losing a playoff against Kokona Sakurai. Kuwaki became noticeable on tour for her distinctive sportswear by sponsor Loudmouth Golf.

In 2024, Kuwaki enjoyed her best season on the LPGA of Japan Tour, with three tournament wins. In June, she won the Shiseido Ladies Open and in August she won the Nitori Ladies Golf Tournament. In November, she won the Japan LPGA Tour Championship Ricoh Cup, her first major event. During the event, she wore distinctive pants patterned with red lobsters, catching the attention of the Japanese press. After winning the tournament, the LPGA of Japan Tour had her handprints cast in bronze in a shopping center in Nishi-Tachi, Miyazaki City. JA Group Okayama, based in her hometown gifted the player 120kg of Okayama-produced rice and 2kg of Okayama Wagyu beef in honor of her three wins.

In 2024, she qualified for the AIG Women's Open, but was unable to play due to poor health. Kuwaki finished the 2024 LPGA of Japan Tour season in 6th place.

In January 2025, Kuwaki was selected as a designated training player by the Japanese Olympic team. In February, Kuwaki received the Okayama Sports Award, awarded by her hometown for her achievement in sport.

That year, Kuwaki made her LPGA Tour debut, playing the U.S. Women's Open, her first major overseas tournament. She made the cut, but later described the tournament as the "hardest one so far". In August, she won the AIG Women's Open to claim her first major title following a playoff with Germany's Esther Henseleit.

== Professional wins (10) ==
=== LPGA Tour wins (1) ===
Legend
Major championships (1)
Other LPGA Tour (0)

No.	Date	Tournament	Winning score	To par	Margin of victory	Runner-up
1	2 Aug 2026	**AIG Women's Open**^{[1]}	66-70-73-70=279	−5	Playoff	(Germany) Esther Henseleit

^{1} Co-sanctioned by the Ladies European Tour.

LPGA Tour playoff record (1–0)

No.	Year	Tournament	Opponent	Result
1	2026	**AIG Women's Open**	(Germany) Esther Henseleit	Won with par on second extra hole

=== LPGA of Japan Tour wins (8) ===
No.	Date	Tournament	Winning score	To par	Margin of victory	Runner(s)-up
1	30 Jun 2024	Shiseido Ladies Open	65-71-69=205	−11	2 strokes	(Japan) Kotone Hori
2	25 Aug 2024	Nitori Ladies	67-70-69-70=276	−12	1 stroke	(South Korea) Bae Seon-woo (Japan) Karen Tsuruoka
3	24 Nov 2024	**Japan LPGA Tour Championship Ricoh Cup**	66-69-69-72=276	−12	1 stroke	(Japan) Sakura Koiwai
4	17 May 2026	Sky RKB Ladies Classic	68-66-67=201	−15	1 stroke	(Taiwan) Wu Chia-yen
5	14 Jun 2026	Ai Miyazato Suntory Ladies Open Golf Tournament	64-65-70-70=269	−19	1 stroke	(Japan) Kana Nagai
6	27 Sep 2026	Miyagi TV Cup Dunlop Women's Open Golf Tournament	69-67-68=204	−12	2 strokes	(Japan) Megumi Kido
7	25 Oct 2026	Nobuta Group Masters GC Ladies	68-69-67-69=273	−16	1 stroke	(Japan) Ayame Morii
8	15 Nov 2026	Ito En Ladies Golf Tournament	68-63-68=199	−17	1 stroke	(Japan) Seira Oki (South Korea) Jiyai Shin

Tournaments in bold denotes major tournaments in LPGA of Japan Tour.

=== Other wins (1) ===
- 2021 JLPTGA Rookies Championship Kaga Electronics Cup

== Majors championships ==
=== Wins (1) ===
Year	Championship	54 holes	Winning score	Margin	Runner-up
2026	AIG Women's Open	3 shot deficit	−5 (66-70-73-70=279)	Playoff	(Germany) Esther Henseleit

=== Results timeline ===
Tournament	2025	2026
Chevron Championship		
U.S. Women's Open	T56	T14
Women's PGA Championship	CUT	T24
The Evian Championship		T41
Women's British Open	CUT	1

Win
Did not play

CUT = missed the half-way cut
T = tied

=== Summary ===
Tournament	Wins	2nd	3rd	Top-5	Top-10	Top-25	Events	Cuts made
Chevron Championship	0	0	0	0	0	0	0	0
U.S. Women's Open	0	0	0	0	0	1	2	2
Women's PGA Championship	0	0	0	0	0	1	2	1
The Evian Championship	0	0	0	0	0	0	1	1
Women's British Open	1	0	0	1	1	1	2	1
Totals	1	0	0	1	1	3	7	5

- Most consecutive cuts made – 4 (2026 U.S. Open – 2026 British Open, current)
- Longest streak of top-10s – 1 (current)
