= Sora Kamiya =

Japanese professional golfer (born 2003)

Sora Kamiya 神谷 そら
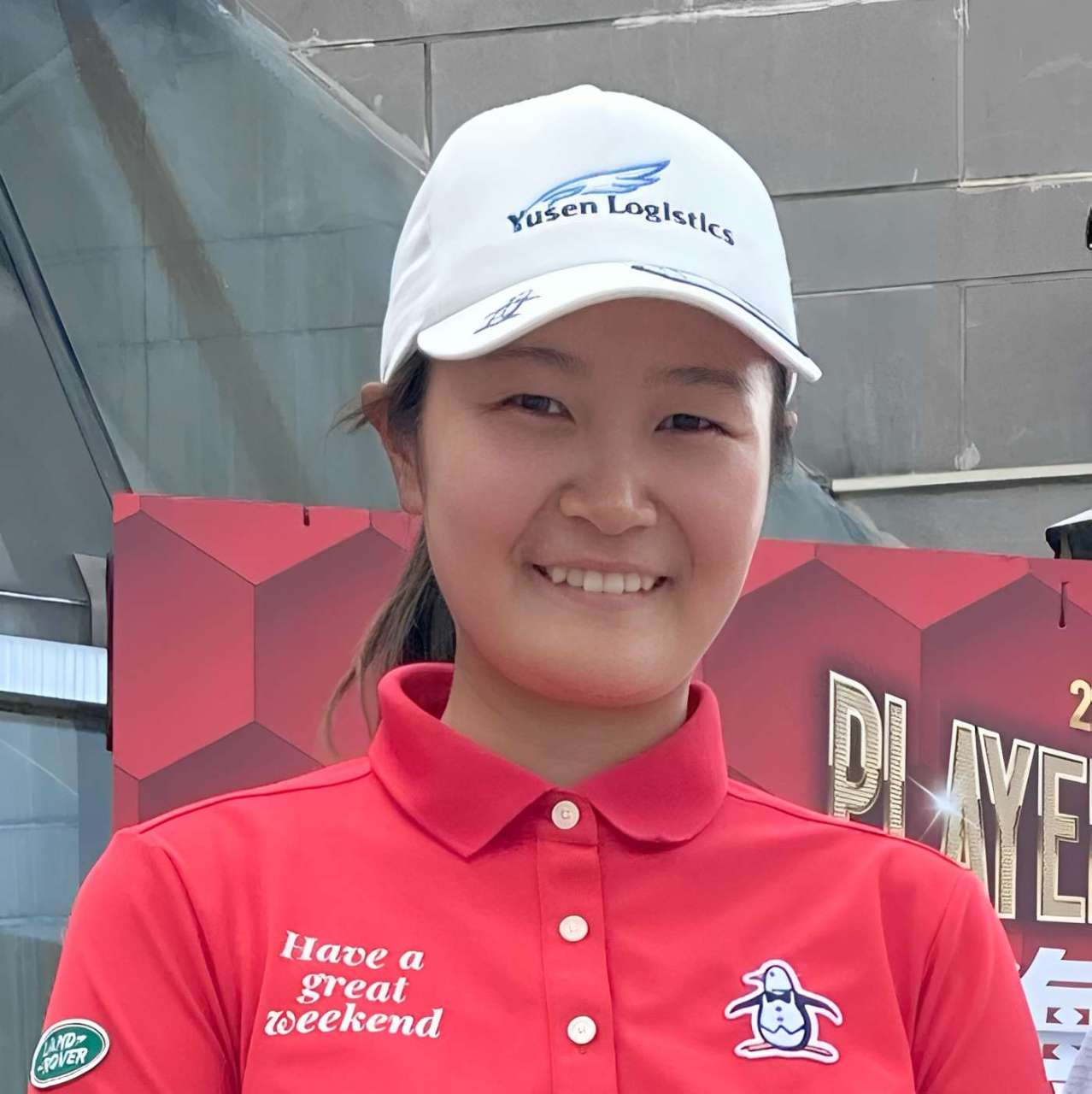
- March 2025

Personal information
- Nationality: Japan
- Born: 18 April 2003 (age 23) Toki, Gifu, Japan
- Height: 168 cm (5 ft 6 in)

Career
- Sport: Golf
- Turned professional: 2023
- Current tour: LPGA of Japan Tour
- Professional wins: 4

Number of wins by tour
- LPGA of Japan Tour: 4

Best results in LPGA major championships
- Chevron Championship: T38: 2026
- Women's PGA C'ship: DNP
- U.S. Women's Open: T28: 2026
- Women's British Open: CUT: 2025
- Evian Championship: DNP

Sora Kamiya (神谷 そら, Kamiya Sora) (born 18 April 2003) is a Japanese professional golfer. She plays on the LPGA of Japan Tour where she has fourwins.

== Career ==
She captured the 2023 Fujisankei Ladies Classic for her maiden win on the JLPGA.

== Professional wins (4) ==
=== LPGA of Japan Tour wins (4) ===
| No. | Date | Tournament | Winning score | To par | Margin of victory | Runner(s)-up |
|---|---|---|---|---|---|---|
| 1 | 23 Apr 2023 | Fujisankei Ladies Classic | 68-68-73=209 | −4 | 1 stroke | (Japan) Reika Arakawa (Japan) Chisato Iwai (Japan) Yuka Yasuda |
| 2 | 10 Sep 2023 | **Japan LPGA Championship Konica Minolta Cup** | 72-66-70-68=276 | −12 | 1 stroke | (Japan) Sakura Koiwai |
| 3 | 18 May 2025 | Sky RKB Ladies Classic | 70-65-67=202 | −14 | 1 stroke | (Japan) Shina Kanazawa (Japan) Sakura Koiwai |
| 4 | 21 Sep 2025 | Sumitomo Life Vitality Ladies Tokai Classic | 67-67-69=203 | −13 | 1 stroke | (South Korea) Lee Min-young |

Tournaments in bold denotes major tournaments in LPGA of Japan Tour.

== Results in LPGA majors ==
| Tournament | 2024 | 2025 | 2026 |
|---|---|---|---|
| Chevron Championship | | | T38 |
| U.S. Women's Open | CUT | | T28 |
| Women's PGA Championship | | | |
| The Evian Championship | | | |
| Women's British Open | | CUT | |

Did not play

CUT = missed the half-way cut
T = tied
