= Chisato Iwai =

Japanese professional golfer (born 2002)

Chisato Iwai 岩井 千怜
Personal information
- Nickname: Chizzy
- Nationality: Japan
- Born: 5 July 2002 (age 24) Saitama Prefecture, Japan
- Height: 162 cm (5 ft 4 in)

Career
- Sport: Golf
- Turned professional: 2021
- Current tours: LPGA of Japan Tour (joined 2021); LPGA Tour
- Professional wins: 10

Number of wins by tour
- LPGA Tour: 1
- LPGA of Japan Tour: 8
- Other: 1

Best results in LPGA major championships
- Chevron Championship: T30: 2025
- Women's PGA C'ship: T4: 2025
- U.S. Women's Open: T19: 2024
- Women's British Open: T29: 2026
- Evian Championship: T14: 2025

Chisato Iwai (岩井 千怜, Iwai Chisato) (born 5 July 2002) is a Japanese professional golfer. She plays on the LPGA Tour and the LPGA of Japan Tour where she has 8 wins.

== Early life and amateur career ==
Iwai was born in Saitama Prefecture and started playing golf at 8 years old. She won the Golf Digest Japan Junior Cup twice.

== Professional career ==
Iwai turned professional and joined the LPGA of Japan Tour in 2021. As a rookie she won a title on the developmental circuit, the Step-Up tour.

She had her breakthrough in 2022 when she won two titles. In 2023, she won another two titles.

In 2024, she tied for 19th at the U.S. Women's Open, and rose to 42nd in the Women's World Golf Rankings.

In December 2024, Iwai earned her LPGA Tour card for 2025 by finishing second at the LPGA Final Qualifying Tournament.

== Personal life ==
Her twin sister, Akie is also a professional golfer on the LPGA Tour and the LPGA of Japan Tour.

== Amateur wins ==
- 2018 Golf Digest Japan Junior Cup
- 2019 Golf Digest Japan Junior Cup

== Professional wins (10) ==
=== LPGA Tour (1) ===
No.	Date	Tournament	Winning score	To par	Margin of victory	Runner-up
1	25 May 2025	Riviera Maya Open	68-74-68-66=276	−12	6 strokes	(United States) Jenny Bae

=== LPGA of Japan Tour wins (8) ===
No.	Date	Tournament	Winning score	To par	Margin of victory	Runner(s)-up
1	14 Aug 2022	NEC Karuizawa 72 Golf Tournament	66-68-69=203	−13	2 strokes	(Japan) Kotone Hori (Japan) Minami Katsu (Japan) Nana Suganuma (Japan) Nozomi Uetake (Japan) Yuri Yoshida (Japan) Hikaru Yoshimoto
2	21 Aug 2022	CAT Ladies	67-66-70=203	−13	1 stroke	(Japan) Miyū Yamashita
3	14 May 2023	RKB Mitsui Matsushima Ladies	66-74-65=205	−11	Playoff	(Japan) Akie Iwai (Japan) Miyū Yamashita
4	11 Jun 2023	Ai Miyazato Suntory Ladies Open Golf Tournament	63-67-67-68=265	−15	5 strokes	(South Korea) Jiyai Shin (Japan) Miyū Yamashita
5	3 Mar 2024	Daikin Orchid Ladies Golf Tournament	65-73-65-67=270	−18	2 strokes	(Japan) Mao Saigo
6	12 May 2024	RKB-Mitsui Matsushima Ladies	69-68-67=204	−12	3 strokes	(Japan) Saiki Fujita (Japan) Miyū Yamashita
7	27 Oct 2024	Hisako Higuchi Mitsubishi Electric Ladies Golf Tournament	67-65-68=200	−16	2 strokes	(Japan) Akie Iwai (Japan) Yuri Yoshida
8	9 Mar 2025	Daikin Orchid Ladies Golf Tournament	74-68-70-66=278	−10	4 strokes	(Japan) Ayako Kimura (South Korea) Jiyai Shin (Japan) Fuka Suga

=== Step-Up Tour wins (1) ===
No.	Date	Tournament	Winning score	To par	Margin of victory	Runner-up
1	3 Sep 2021	Castrol Ladies	71-68-67=206	−10	Playoff	(Japan) Nanako Ueno

== Results in LPGA majors ==
Results not in chronological order.

Tournament	2023	2024	2025	2026
Chevron Championship			T30	CUT
U.S. Women's Open	T48	T19	T22	CUT
Women's PGA Championship		CUT	T4	CUT
The Evian Championship	CUT		T14	CUT
Women's British Open	CUT	CUT	T58	T29

Top 10
Did not play

CUT = missed the half-way cut
"T" = tied

== Team appearances ==
Professional

- Hitachi 3Tours Championship (representing JLPGA): 2023 (winners)
