= Yuna Araki =

Japanese professional golfer (born 2005)

Yuna Araki 荒木 優奈
Personal information
- Nationality: Japan
- Born: 17 June 2005 (age 21) Tamana, Kumamoto, Japan
- Height: 156 cm (5 ft 1 in)

Career
- Sport: Golf
- Turned professional: 2024
- Current tour: LPGA of Japan Tour
- Professional wins: 2

Number of wins by tour
- LPGA of Japan Tour: 2

Best results in LPGA major championships
- Chevron Championship: DNP
- Women's PGA C'ship: DNP
- U.S. Women's Open: CUT: 2026
- Women's British Open: T29: 2026
- Evian Championship: DNP

Yuna Araki (荒木 優奈, Araki Yuna) (born 17 June 2005) is a Japanese professional golfer. She plays on the LPGA of Japan Tour where she has two wins.

== Career ==
She captured the 2025 Golf 5 Ladies Professional Golf Tournament for her maiden win on the JLPGA.

== Professional wins (2) ==
=== LPGA of Japan Tour wins (2) ===
No.	Date	Tournament	Winning score	To par	Margin of victory	Runner(s)-up
1	7 Sep 2025	Golf 5 Ladies	64-68=132	−12	1 stroke	(Japan) Asuka Kashiwabara
2	22 Nov 2026	Daio Paper Elleair Ladies Open	65-71-69-66=271	−13	1 stroke	(Japan) Kokone Yoshimoto

== Results in LPGA majors ==
Tournament	2026
Chevron Championship	
U.S. Women's Open	CUT
Women's PGA Championship	
The Evian Championship	
Women's British Open	T29

Did not play

CUT = missed the half-way cut
T = tied
