= List of golfers with most LPGA of Japan Tour wins =

This is a list of golfers who have won 10 or more events on the LPGA of Japan Tour.

Many of the players on the list have won events on other tours and unofficial events.

A player with 30th career victory earns permanent seeding on the Tour.

Members of the World Golf Hall of Fame are annotated HoF.

This list is up to date as of 18 October 2026

Rank	Player	Lifespan	Country	Wins	Winning span
1	Hisako "Chako" Higuchi HoF	1945–	Japan	69	1968–1990
2	Tu Ai-yu	1954–	Taiwan	58	1974–2002
3	Yuri Fudoh	1976–	Japan	50	1999–2011
4	Tatsuko Ohsako	1952–	Japan	45	1975–1991
5	Ayako Okamoto HoF	1951–	Japan	44	1975–1999
6	Yuko Moriguchi	1955–	Japan	41	1978–1994
7	Jiyai Shin	1988–	South Korea	32	2008–2026
8	Nayoko Yoshikawa	1949–	Japan	29	1979–1995
9	Ahn Sun-ju	1987–	South Korea	28	2010–2018
10	Jeon Mi-jeong	1982–	South Korea	25	2009–2017
11	Akiko Fukushima	1973–	Japan	24	1994–2010
T12	Lee Ji-hee	1979–	South Korea	23	2001–2019
T12	Ku Ok-hee	1956–2013	South Korea	23	1985–2005
T12	Sakura Yokomine	1985–	Japan	23	2005–2014
T12	Ai Suzuki	1994–	Japan	23	2014–2026
16	Lee Bo-mee	1988–	South Korea	21	2012–2017
17	Ikuyo Shiotani	1962–	Japan	20	1989–2003
T18	Shiho Oyama	1977–	Japan	18	2003–2018
T18	Michiko Hattori	1968–	Japan	18	1993–2005
T18	Atsuko Hikage	1954–	Japan	18	1980–1993
T18	Mayumi Hirase	1969–	Japan	18	1989–2000
T22	Aiko Takasu	1952–	Japan	17	1986–1998
T22	Kaori Higo	1969–	Japan	17	1992–2004
T22	Momoko Ueda	1986–	Japan	17	2007–2022
25	Teresa Lu	1987–	Taiwan	16	2013–2017
26	Junko Yasui	1960–	Japan	15	1988–2000
T27	Chie Arimura	1987–	Japan	14	2008–2012
T27	Ai Miyazato	1985–	Japan	14	2004–2009
T27	Miyū Yamashita	2001–	Japan	14	2021–2026
T30	Huang Bie-shyun	1956–	Taiwan	13	1995–2007
T30	Misuzu Narita	1992–	Japan	13	2012–2019
T30	Mone Inami	1999–	Japan	13	2019–2023
T33	Miho Koga	1982–	Japan	12	2003–2010
T33	Sakura Koiwai	1998–	Japan	12	2019–2025
35	Fukumi Tani	1959–	Japan	11	1987–1990
T36	Michiko Okada	1945–	Japan	10	1975–1995
T36	Toshimi Kimura	1968–	Japan	10	1993–2007
T36	Huang Yueh-chyn	1955–	Taiwan	10	1985–1991
T36	Hiromi Kobayashi	1963–	Japan	10	1989–2002
T36	Aki Takamura	1972–	Japan	10	1995–2001
T36	Kasumi Fujii	1967–	Japan	10	1995–2006

== See also ==
- List of golfers with most Japan Golf Tour wins
