= 2018 LPGA of Japan Tour =

Provessional golf tour

The 2018 LPGA of Japan Tour was the 51st season of the LPGA of Japan Tour, the professional golf tour for women operated by the Ladies Professional Golfers' Association of Japan. The 2018 schedule included 38 official events.

Leading money winner was Ahn Sun-ju with ¥180,784,885. Jiyai Shin won the Mercedes Ranking. Ai Suzuki had the lowest scoring average. Mamiko Higa finished most often (18 times) inside the top-10.

== Schedule ==
The number in parentheses after winners' names show the player's total number wins in official money individual events on the LPGA of Japan Tour, including that event. All tournaments were played in Japan.

Dates	Tournament	Location	Prize fund (¥)	Winner	WWGR pts
Mar 1–4	Daikin Orchid Ladies Golf Tournament	Okinawa	120,000,000	(South Korea) Lee Min-young (3)	19.5
Mar 9–11	Yokohama Tire Golf Tournament PRGR Ladies Cup	Kōchi	80,000,000	(South Korea) Ahn Sun-ju (24)	19.5
Mar 16–18	T-Point Ladies Golf Tournament	Osaka	70,000,000	(Japan) Ai Suzuki (6)	19.5
Mar 23–25	AXA Ladies Golf Tournament in Miyazaki	Miyazaki	80,000,000	(Taiwan) Phoebe Yao (2)	18
Mar 29 – Apr 1	Yamaha Ladies Open Katsuragi	Shizuoka	100,000,000	(South Korea) Ahn Sun-ju (25)	19
Apr 6–8	Studio Alice Women's Open	Hyogo	60,000,000	(Japan) Ai Suzuki (7)	18.5
Apr 13–15	KKT Cup Vantelin Ladies Open	Kumamoto	100,000,000	(Japan) Mamiko Higa (4)	19.5
Apr 20–22	Fujisankei Ladies Classic	Shizuoka	80,000,000	(Japan) Saki Nagamine (1)	16.5
Apr 27–29	Cyber Agent Ladies Golf Tournament	Shizuoka	80,000,000	(Japan) Hina Arakaki (1)	17.5
May 3–6	**World Ladies Championship Salonpas Cup**	Ibaraki	120,000,000	(South Korea) Jiyai Shin (18)	20.5
May 11–13	Hoken No Madoguchi Ladies	Fukuoka	120,000,000	(Japan) Ai Suzuki (8)	19.5
May 18–20	Chukyo TV Bridgestone Ladies Open	Aichi	70,000,000	(South Korea) Bae Hee-kyung (1)	18.5
May 25–27	Resort Trust Ladies	Hyogo	80,000,000	(Japan) Eri Okayama (1)	17
Jun 1–3	Yonex Ladies Golf Tournament	Niigata	70,000,000	(Japan) Shiho Oyama (18)	15.5
Jun 7–10	Ai Miyazato Suntory Ladies Open Golf Tournament	Hyogo	100,000,000	(Japan) Misuzu Narita (9)	19
Jun 15–17	Nichirei Ladies	Chiba	80,000,000	(Japan) Ai Suzuki (9)	19
Jun 21–24	Earth Mondahmin Cup	Chiba	180,000,000	(Japan) Misuzu Narita (10)	19
Jul 6–8	Nipponham Ladies Classic	Hokkaido	100,000,000	(South Korea) Ahn Sun-ju (26)	19
Jul 13–15	Samantha Thavasa Girls Collection Ladies Tournament	Ibaraki	60,000,000	(Japan) Chie Arimura (14)	17
Jul 20–22	Century 21 Ladies Golf Tournament	Shiga	80,000,000	(United States) Kristen Gillman (a,1)	18
Jul 26–29	Daito Kentaku Eheyanet Ladies	Yamanashi	120,000,000	(South Korea) Hwang Ah-reum (2)	19
Aug 3–5	Hokkaido Meiji Cup	Hokkaido	90,000,000	(Japan) Mami Fukuda (2)	17
Aug 10–12	NEC Karuizawa 72 Golf Tournament	Nagano	80,000,000	(South Korea) Hwang Ah-reum (3)	17
Aug 17–19	CAT Ladies	Kanagawa	60,000,000	(Japan) Momoko Osato (1)	16
Aug 23–26	Nitori Ladies Golf Tournament	Hokkaido	100,000,000	(South Korea) Ahn Sun-ju (27)	19
Aug 31 – Sep 2	Golf5 Ladies	Gifu	60,000,000	(South Korea) Jiyai Shin (19)	16
Sep 6–9	**Japan LPGA Championship Konica Minolta Cup**	Toyama	200,000,000	(South Korea) Jiyai Shin (20)	19.5
Sep 14–16	Munsingwear Ladies Tokai Classic	Aichi	80,000,000	(Japan) Kotono Kozuma (1)	18.5
Sep 21–23	Miyagi TV Cup Dunlop Women's Open Golf Tournament	Miyagi	70,000,000	(Japan) Kaori Ohe (3)	17.5
Sep 27–30	**Japan Women's Open Golf Championship**	Chiba	140,000,000	(South Korea) Ryu So-yeon (1)	22
Oct 5–7	Stanley Ladies Golf Tournament	Shizuoka	100,000,000	(Japan) Shoko Sasaki (2)	15.5
Oct 12–14	Fujitsu Ladies	Chiba	80,000,000	(Japan) Misuzu Narita (11)	19
Oct 18–21	Nobuta Group Masters GC Ladies	Hyogo	180,000,000	(South Korea) Ahn Sun-ju (28)	19.5
Oct 26–28	Hisako Higuchi Mitsubishi Electric Ladies Golf Tournament	Saitama	80,000,000	(Japan) Shoko Sasaki (3)	18
Nov 2–4	Toto Japan Classic	Shiga	US$1,500,000	(Japan) Nasa Hataoka (4)	53
Nov 9–11	Ito En Ladies Golf Tournament	Chiba	100,000,000	(South Korea) Hwang Ah-reum (4)	19
Nov 15–18	Daio Paper Elleair Ladies Open	Ehime	100,000,000	(Japan) Minami Katsu (2)	19.5
Nov 22–25	**Japan LPGA Tour Championship Ricoh Cup**	Miyazaki	100,000,000	(South Korea) Jiyai Shin (21)	17

Events in bold are majors.
The Toto Japan Classic was co-sanctioned with the LPGA Tour.
