= 2016 LPGA of Japan Tour =

Golf tour season

The 2016 LPGA of Japan Tour was the 49th season of the LPGA of Japan Tour, the professional golf tour for women operated by the Ladies Professional Golfers' Association of Japan. The 2016 schedule included 38 official events.

Leading money winner was Lee Bo-mee with ¥175,869,764. She also won the Mercedes Ranking and had the lowest scoring average. Ritsuko Ryu finished most often (22 times) inside the top-10.

== Schedule ==
The number in parentheses after winners' names show the player's total number wins in official money individual events on the LPGA of Japan Tour, including that event. All tournaments were played in Japan.

| Dates | Tournament | Location | Prize fund (¥) | Winner |
|---|---|---|---|---|
| Mar 3–6 | Daikin Orchid Ladies Golf Tournament | Okinawa | 120,000,000 | (Taiwan) Teresa Lu (10) |
| Mar 11–13 | Yokohama Tire Golf Tournament PRGR Ladies Cup | Kōchi | 80,000,000 | (South Korea) Lee Bo-mee (16) |
| Mar 18–20 | T-Point Ladies Golf Tournament | Kagoshima | 70,000,000 | (Japan) Kaori Ohe (2) |
| Mar 25–27 | AXA Ladies Golf Tournament in Miyazaki | Miyazaki | 80,000,000 | (South Korea) Kim Ha-neul (2) |
| Mar 31 – Apr 3 | Yamaha Ladies Open Katsuragi | Shizuoka | 100,000,000 | (South Korea) Lee Ji-hee (20) |
| Apr 8–10 | Studio Alice Women's Open | Hyogo | 60,000,000 | (Japan) Erika Kikuchi (2) |
| Apr 15–17 | KKT Cup Vantelin Ladies Open | Kumamoto | 100,000,000 | Cancelled due to earthquake |
| Apr 22–24 | Fujisankei Ladies Classic | Shizuoka | 80,000,000 | (Japan) Shiho Oyama (17) |
| Apr 29 – May 1 | Cyber Agent Ladies Golf Tournament | Shizuoka | 70,000,000 | (Japan) Hiroko Fukushima (1) |
| May 5–8 | **World Ladies Championship Salonpas Cup** | Ibaraki | 120,000,000 | (United States) Lexi Thompson (1) |
| May 13–15 | Hoken No Madoguchi Ladies | Fukuoka | 120,000,000 | (South Korea) Jiyai Shin (13) |
| May 20–22 | Chukyo TV Bridgestone Ladies Open | Aichi | 70,000,000 | (Japan) Ai Suzuki (2) |
| May 27–29 | Resort Trust Ladies | Tokushima | 80,000,000 | (Japan) Junko Omote (5) |
| Jun 3–5 | Yonex Ladies Golf Tournament | Niigata | 70,000,000 | (Thailand) Porani Chutichai (1) |
| Jun 9–12 | Suntory Ladies Open Golf Tournament | Hyogo | 100,000,000 | (South Korea) Kang Soo-yun (2) |
| Jun 17–19 | Nichirei Ladies | Chiba | 80,000,000 | (South Korea) Jiyai Shin (14) |
| Jun 23–26 | Earth Mondahmin Cup | Chiba | 140,000,000 | (South Korea) Lee Bo-mee (17) |
| Jul 8–10 | Nipponham Ladies Classic | Hokkaido | 100,000,000 | (Japan) Rumi Yoshiba (1) |
| Jul 15–17 | Samantha Thavasa Girls Collection Ladies Tournament | Ibaraki | 60,000,000 | (South Korea) Jeon Mi-jeong (23) |
| Jul 22–24 | Century 21 Ladies Golf Tournament | Shizuoka | 80,000,000 | (South Korea) Ahn Sun-ju (21) |
| Jul 29–31 | Daito Kentaku Eheyanet Ladies | Yamanashi | 80,000,000 | (Japan) Shoko Sasaki (1) |
| Aug 5–7 | Meiji Cup | Hokkaido | 90,000,000 | (South Korea) Lee Bo-mee (18) |
| Aug 12–14 | NEC Karuizawa 72 Golf Tournament | Nagano | 80,000,000 | (Japan) Ritsuko Ryu (4) |
| Aug 19–21 | CAT Ladies | Kanagawa | 60,000,000 | (South Korea) Lee Bo-mee (19) |
| Aug 25–28 | Nitori Ladies Golf Tournament | Hokkaido | 100,000,000 | (Japan) Ritsuko Ryu (5) |
| Sep 2–4 | Golf5 Ladies | Hokkaido | 60,000,000 | (Japan) Lala Anai (1) |
| Sep 8–11 | **Japan LPGA Championship Konica Minolta Cup** | Hokkaido | 140,000,000 | (Japan) Ai Suzuki (3) |
| Sep 16–18 | Munsingwear Ladies Tokai Classic | Aichi | 80,000,000 | (Taiwan) Teresa Lu (11) |
| Sep 23–25 | Miyagi TV Cup Dunlop Women's Open Golf Tournament | Miyagi | 70,000,000 | (South Korea) Lee Ji-hee (21) |
| Sep 29 – Oct 2 | **Japan Women's Open Golf Championship** | Tochigi | 140,000,000 | (Japan) Nasa Hataoka (a,1) |
| Oct 7–9 | Stanley Ladies Golf Tournament | Shizuoka | 90,000,000 | (South Korea) Ahn Sun-ju (22) |
| Oct 14–16 | Fujitsu Ladies | Chiba | 80,000,000 | (Japan) Ayaka Matsumori (1) |
| Oct 20–23 | Nobuta Group Masters GC Ladies | Hyogo | 140,000,000 | (South Korea) Jeon Mi-jeong (24) |
| Oct 28–30 | Hisako Higuchi Mitsubishi Electric Ladies Golf Tournament | Saitama | 80,000,000 | (South Korea) Jiyai Shin (15) |
| Nov 4–6 | Toto Japan Classic | Ibaraki | US$1,500,000 | (China) Shanshan Feng (6) |
| Nov 11–13 | Ito En Ladies Golf Tournament | Chiba | 100,000,000 | (South Korea) Lee Bo-mee (20) |
| Nov 17–20 | Daio Paper Elleair Ladies Open | Ehime | 100,000,000 | (Taiwan) Teresa Lu (12) |
| Nov 24–27 | **Japan LPGA Tour Championship Ricoh Cup** | Miyazaki | 100,000,000 | (South Korea) Kim Ha-neul (3) |

Events in bold are majors.
(a) denotes amateur

The Toto Japan Classic was co-sanctioned with the LPGA Tour.
