= 2009 LPGA of Japan Tour =

The 2009 LPGA of Japan Tour was the 42nd season of the LPGA of Japan Tour, the professional golf tour for women operated by the Ladies Professional Golfers' Association of Japan. It consisted of 35 golf tournaments, all played in Japan.

Sakura Yokomine won the Order of Merit, had the lowest scoring average and finished most often (22 times) inside the top-10.

== Tournament results ==
Dates	Tournament	Location	Prize fund (JPY)	Winner
Mar 6–8	Daikin Orchid Ladies	Okinawa	80,000,000	(Japan) Yuko Mitsuka
Mar 20–22	Yokohama Tire PRGR Ladies Cup	Kōchi	80,000,000	(Japan) Ayako Uehara
Apr 3–5	Yamaha Ladies Open	Shizuoka	80,000,000	(South Korea) Huang Ah-reum
Apr 10–12	Studio Alice Ladies Open	Hyogo	60,000,000	(Japan) Sakura Yokomine
Apr 17–19	Life Card Ladies	Kumamoto	70,000,000	(South Korea) Lee Ji-hee
Apr 24–26	Fujisankei Ladies Classic	Shizuoka	80,000,000	(Australia) Tamie Durdin
May 1–3	Crystal Geyser Ladies	Chiba	70,000,000	(Japan) Chie Arimura
May 7–10	**World Ladies Championship Salonpas Cup**	Ibaraki	120,000,000	(Japan) Shinobu Moromizato
May 15–17	Vernal Ladies	Fukuoka	100,000,000	(Japan) Yuko Saito
May 22–24	Chukyo TV Bridgestone Ladies Open	Aichi	70,000,000	(South Korea) Lim Eun-a
May 29–31	Kosaido Ladies	Chiba	60,000,000	(Japan) Sakura Yokomine
Jun 5–7	Resort Trust Ladies	Shiga	70,000,000	(South Korea) Jeon Mi-jeong
Jun 11–14	Suntory Ladies Open	Hyogo	100,000,000	(Japan) Shinobu Moromizato
Jun 19–21	Nichirei PGM Ladies	Ibaraki	80,000,000	(Japan) Sakura Yokomine
Jun 26–28	Promise Ladies	Hyogo	80,000,000	(Japan) Shinobu Moromizato
Jul 10–12	Meiji Chocolate Cup	Hokkaido	90,000,000	(South Korea) Jeon Mi-jeong
Jul 17–19	Stanley Ladies	Shizuoka	90,000,000	(Japan) Chie Arimura
Aug 7–9	AXA Ladies	Hokkaido	80,000,000	(Japan) Momoko Ueda
Aug 14–16	NEC Karuizawa 72	Nagano	60,000,000	(Japan) Chie Arimura
Aug 21–23	CAT Ladies	Kanagawa	70,000,000	(Japan) Shinobu Moromizato
Aug 28–30	Yonex Ladies	Niigata	60,000,000	(South Korea) Jeon Mi-jeong
Sep 4–6	Golf5 Ladies	Gifu	60,000,000	(Japan) Shinobu Moromizato
Sep 10–13	**Japan LPGA Championship Konica Minolta Cup**	Gifu	140,000,000	(Japan) Shinobu Moromizato
Sep 18–20	Munsingwear Ladies Tokai Classic	Aichi	80,000,000	(Japan) Sakura Yokomine
Sep 25–27	Miyagi TV Cup Dunlop Ladies Open	Miyagi	60,000,000	(Japan) Chie Arimura
Oct 1–4	**Japan Women's Open Golf Championship**	Chiba	140,000,000	(South Korea) Song Bo-bae
Oct 9–11	Sankyo Ladies Open	Gunma	100,000,000	(Japan) Ai Miyazato
Oct 16–18	Fujitsu Ladies	Chiba	80,000,000	(Australia) Nikki Campbell
Oct 23–25	Masters GC Ladies	Hyogo	123,000,000	(South Korea) Jiyai Shin
Oct 30 – Nov 1	Hisako Higuchi IDC Otsuka Kagu Ladies	Saitama	70,000,000	(South Korea) Jeon Mi-jeong
Nov 6–8	Mizuno Classic	Mie	US$1,400,000	(South Korea) Song Bo-bae
Nov 13–15	Itoen Ladies	Chiba	90,000,000	(Japan) Sakura Yokomine
Nov 20–22	Daio Paper Elleair Ladies Open	Kagawa	90,000,000	(Japan) Chie Arimura
Nov 27–30	**Japan LPGA Tour Championship Ricoh Cup**	Miyazaki	100,000,000	(Japan) Sakura Yokomine
Dec 4–5	2009 Kyoraku Cup	Okinawa	61,500,000	South Korea

Events in bold are majors.

The Mizuno Classic was co-sanctioned with LPGA Tour.

== See also ==
- 2009 Japan Golf Tour
- 2009 in golf
