= Ayako Uehara (golfer) =

Japanese professional golfer (born 1983)

Ayako Uehara 上原 彩子
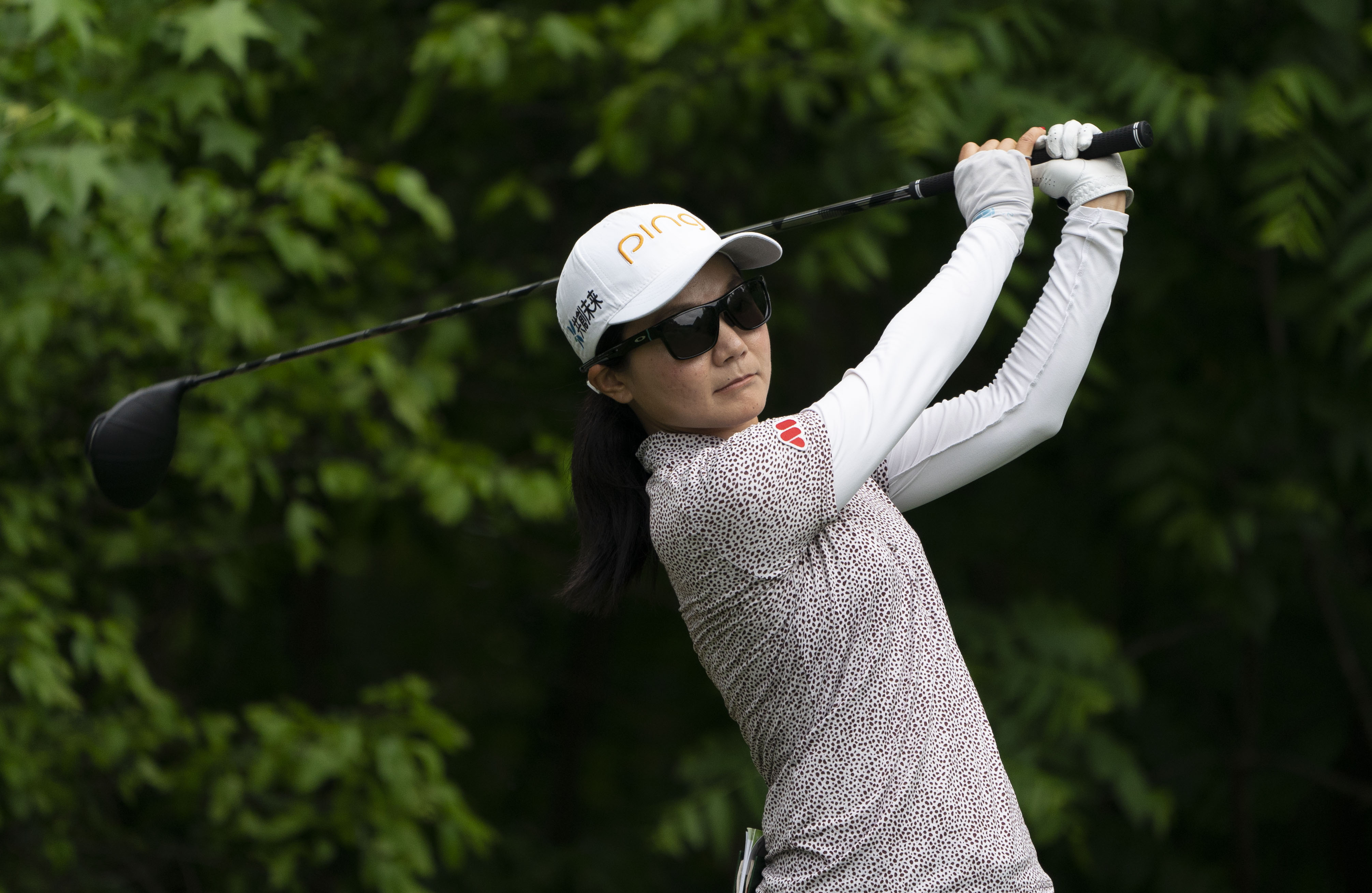

Personal information
- Nationality: Japan
- Born: 23 December 1983 (age 42) Naha, Okinawa, Japan
- Height: 1.60 m (5 ft 3 in)

Career
- Sport: Golf
- Turned professional: 2004
- Current tour: Ladies European Tour (joined 2024)
- Former tours: LPGA of Japan Tour; LPGA Tour (2013–2023)
- Professional wins: 3

Number of wins by tour
- LPGA of Japan Tour: 3

Best results in LPGA major championships
- Chevron Championship: 8th: 2018
- Women's PGA C'ship: T44: 2013
- U.S. Women's Open: T20: 2015
- Women's British Open: T17: 2013
- Evian Championship: T10: 2017
Medal record
Asian Games
Silver medal – second place	2002 Busan	Women's team

Ayako Uehara (上原 彩子, Uehara Ayako; born 23 December 1983 in Naha, Okinawa) is a Japanese professional golfer.

== Career ==
Uehara, from Okinawa, started playing golf at age 12. She had a successful amateur career and won the Japan Women's Junior Golf Championship at the age of 15, and the Japan Women's Amateur Golf Championship at the age of 18. Together with Ai Miyazato and Sakura Yokomine, she was a member of the Japanese team that won a silver medal at the 2002 Asian Games.

In 2003, Uehara turned professional and joined the LPGA of Japan Tour, where she was tied for 3rd as a rookie at the Japan Women's Open Golf Championship, and later recorded three victories. She finished third at the LPGA Tour co-sanctioned 2012 Mizuno Classic. In 2013, she made her way onto the LPGA Tour on her first attempt, where she finish third in the Rookie of the Year rankings. She recorded a tied 4th finish at the 2014 Mizuno Classic, just a stroke out of joining a playoff.

In 2016, Uehara made two holes-in-one during the Canadian Pacific Women's Open, tying the LPGA record for most holes-in-one in a single tournament. In November the same year, she set another record when she posted a score of 141 during round one of the Ito En Ladies Golf Tournament on the LPGA of Japan Tour. Uehara mistakenly applied the local rule of "lift, clean, and place" (common on the LPGA) when it should have been "lift, clean, and replace", earning her 68 penalties, two for each of the 19 violations and one for each of the 15 holes with an incorrect score on her scorecard.

Uehara held the lead after the first round of the 2014 Women's British Open at Royal Birkdale, after an opening four-under-par 68. Uehara, in solo second place just one shot off of the lead, played in the final group at a major championship for the first time in her career at the 2017 Evian Championship.

In 2024, Uehara joined the Ladies European Tour, where she had a best finish of tied 7th at the La Sella Open in Spain. In 2025, she tied for 4th at the Dutch Ladies Open, three strokes behind winner Mimi Rhodes.

== Amateur wins ==
- 1999 Japan Women's Junior Golf Championship
- 2002 Japan Women's Amateur Golf Championship

== Professional wins (3) ==
=== LPGA of Japan Tour wins (3) ===
No.	Date	Tournament	Winning score	To par	Margin of victory	Runner(s)-up
1	27 Apr 2008	Fujisankei Ladies Classic	70-72-66=208	−8	1 stroke	(Japan) Erina Hara
2	22 Mar 2009	Yokohama Tire PRGR Ladies Cup	64-71=135	−9	5 strokes	(South Korea) Hwang Ah-reum (Japan) Midori Yoneyama
3	3 Jul 2011	Nichi-Iko Ladies Open	66-68-66=200	−16	1 stroke	(South Korea) Song Bo-bae

== Results in LPGA majors ==
Results not in chronological order.

Tournament	2013	2014	2015	2016	2017	2018	2019	2020	2021	2022	2023
ANA Inspiration	T19	CUT	T35	T56	T27	8	T26	CUT	CUT		
Women's PGA Championship	T44	T53	CUT	CUT	CUT	T60	CUT		CUT		
U.S. Women's Open	T36	CUT	T20			CUT	CUT		T41		CUT
The Evian Championship	T27	T32	T46	70	T10	CUT	CUT	NT			
Women's British Open	T17	T54			T63	CUT	T21				

Top 10
Did not play

CUT = missed the half-way cut
NT = no tournament
T = tied

=== Summary ===
Tournament	Wins	2nd	3rd	Top-5	Top-10	Top-25	Events	Cuts made
ANA Inspiration	0	0	0	0	1	2	9	6
Women's PGA Championship	0	0	0	0	0	0	8	3
U.S. Women's Open	0	0	0	0	0	1	7	3
The Evian Championship	0	0	0	0	1	1	7	5
Women's British Open	0	0	0	0	0	2	5	4
Totals	0	0	0	0	2	6	36	21

- Most consecutive cuts made – 5 (2013 Kraft Nabisco – 2013 Evian)
- Longest streak of top-10s – 2 (2017 Evian – 2018 ANA)

== Team appearances ==
Amateur

- Asian Games (representing Japan): 2002

Professional

- Lexus Cup (representing Asia team): 2007 (winners)
- International Crown (representing Japan): 2018
