= Junko Omote =

Japanese professional golfer (born 1974)

Junko Omote 表 純子
Personal information
- Nationality: Japan
- Born: 2 February 1974 (age 52) Hiroshima, Hiroshima Prefecture, Japan
- Height: 5 ft .2 in (1.53 m)

Career
- Sport: Golf
- Turned professional: 1996
- Former tour: LPGA of Japan Tour
- Professional wins: 8

Number of wins by tour
- LPGA of Japan Tour: 5
- Other: 3

Junko Omote (Japanese: 表 純子, Hepburn: Omote Junko; born 2 February 1974)) is a Japanese professional golfer. She is a member of the Ladies Professional Golfers' Association of Japan (LPGA of Japan) and is affiliated with the Chubu Health Inspection Center. She was born in Asaminami Ward, Hiroshima City, Hiroshima Prefecture, and graduated from Hiroshima Municipal Hiroshima Commercial High School.

Omote began playing golf at the age of 18. She passed the professional exam on 22 August 1996 and joined the 68nd class of the LPGA of Japan on 1 September of that year.

In 2005, she won her first tournament title at the Meiji Cup. Although she did not win again until 2005, Omote won two tournament titles that year, the second being the Stanley Ladies' Golf Tournament. After this victory she did not win again until the 2013 Yonex Ladies Tournament.

In 2019, she won her first Legends Tour tournament, the LPGA Legends Championship.

On 8 April 2025, Omote won the Okamoto Ayako Cup, a tournament named for her mentor.

Omote is a noted Hiroshima Toyo Carp fan and has dressed in the team's colors during tournaments. Having been a fan of the team since childhood, Omote has said that she considers herself the original "carp girl," a moniker used to describe female fans of the team.

== Professional wins (8) ==
=== LPGA of Japan Tour wins (5) ===
No.	Date	Tournament	Winning score	To par	Margin of victory	Runner(s)-up
1	10 Jul 2005	Chateraise Queen's Cup	69-75-70=214	−2	Playoff	(Japan) Michiko Hattori
2	17 Jul 2025	Stanley Ladies	67-72-65=204	−12	1 stroke	(South Korea) Shin Hyun-ju
3	9 Jun 2013	Yonex Ladies	67-69-70=206	−10	2 strokes	(Japan) Rikako Morita
4	27 Sep 2015	Miyagi TV Cup Dunlop Ladies Open	67-68-70=205	−11	3 strokes	(Japan) Shiho Oyama
5	29 May 2016	Resort Trust Ladies	71-64=135	−9	1 stroke	(Japan) Misuzu Narita

=== Legends Tour wins (3) ===
No.	Year	Tournament	Winning score
1	2019	LPGA Legends Championship	71-70-74=215 (−4)
2	2022	Bond Cup	70-66=136 (−8)
3		Nagasaki Sakura Legends Open	68-68=136 (−8)
