= Ikuyo Shiotani =

Japanese professional golfer (born 1962)

Ikuyo Shiotani 塩谷育代
Personal information
- Nationality: Japan
- Born: 28 May 1962 (age 64) Nagoya, Aichi Prefecture, Japan
- Height: 5 ft .3 in (1.53 m)

Career
- Sport: Golf
- Turned professional: 1983
- Former tour: LPGA of Japan Tour
- Professional wins: 22

Number of wins by tour
- LPGA of Japan Tour: 20
- Other: Legends 1 Other 1

Achievements and awards
- LPGA of Japan Tour Player of the Year: 1992, 1995
- LPGA of Japan Tour leading money winner: 1992, 1995

Ikuyo Shiotani (Japanese: 塩谷育代, Hepburn: Ikuyo Shiotani; born 28 May 1962) is a professional golfer. Inspired by Hisako Higuchi to begin playing golf, Shiotani joined a golf driving range and passed the professional exam in 1983. She joined the 43th class of the Ladies Professional Golfers' Association of Japan (LPGA of Japan).

In 1985, three years after her debut, she began incorporating scientific training under the guidance of professor Seiichi Tanaka of Tokai University.

She won the 1987 Asian Circuit Malaysian Ladies Open, followed by her first championship win in the LPGA of Japan Tour in March 1989, when she competed in the Yakult Mill Mill Ladies Tournament.

Shiotani got married in December 1993. In January 1998, she found out she was pregnant, and went on maternity leave after the Nasu Ogawa Ladies Tournament in late April. On 21 August of the same year, she gave birth to her first son. She returned at the start of the 1999 season.

In September 2003, she won the Fujisankei LadiestTournament, marking her 20th championship win in her 21st year as a professional.

In 2011, she retired and instead participated on the senior tour, served as a television commentator, and began training young professionals and juniors.

In 2022, Shiotani was inducted into the Japan Professional Golf Hall of Fame.

== Professional wins (22) ==
=== LPGA of Japan Tour wins (20) ===
No.	Date	Tournament	Winning score	To par	Margin of victory	Runner(s)-up
1	14 May 1989	Yakult Mirumiru Ladies	72-71-74=217	+1	1 stroke	(Japan) Yoko Kobayashi (Japan) Fukumi Tani
2	27 May 1990	Tohto Motors Ladies	71-70-71=212	−4	Playoff	(Taiwan) Huang Bie-shyun
3	19 Aug 1990	Itoen Ladies	70-69-71=210	−6	2 strokes	(Japan) Mayumi Hirase (Japan) Nayoko Yoshikawa
4	7 Jul 1991	Mizuno Open	70-72-72=214	−2	Playoff	(Japan) Mitsuko Hamada (Japan) Aiko Takasu
5	20 Oct 1991	Fujitsu Ladies	70-68-69=207	−9	2 strokes	(United States) Amy Benz (Japan) Tomiko Ikebuchi
6	22 Mar 1992	Saishunkan Ladies	73-71-71=215	−1	1 stroke	(Taiwan) Huang Bie-shyun
7	20 Mar 1994	Saishunkan Ladies	71-72-71=214	−2	1 stroke	(Japan) Kaori Harada
8	17 Apr 1994	Kensyoen Ladies Dohgo	71-69-69=209	−7	2 strokes	(Japan) Aki Nakano
9	24 Jul 1994	Katokichi Queens	68-74-71=213	−6	3 strokes	(Japan) Kazumi Nango
10	16 Apr 1995	Mitsukoshi Cup	76-77-70-69=292	+4	1 stroke	(New Zealand) Marnie McGuire
11	23 Apr 1995	Nasuogawa Ladies	75-72-70=217	+1	Playoff	(Japan) Mayumi Hirase (Japan) Yuko Moriguchi (Japan) Hisako Takeda
12	21 May 1995	Chukyo TV Bridgestone Ladies	69-69-74=212	−4	1 stroke	(Japan) Yukie Ueki
13	25 Jun 1995	**Japan Women's Open Golf Championship**	69-71-73-72=285	−3	1 stroke	(South Korea) Kim Man-soo
14	26 Nov 1995	**JLPGA Meiji Dairies Cup**	78-67-70=215	−1	Playoff	(Japan) Mitsuyo Hirata
15	8 Sep 1996	**Japan LPGA Championship**	74-70-71-68=283	−5	1 stroke	(Japan) Kaori Higo
16	6 Oct 1996	Takara World Invitational	71-71-69-71=282	−6	2 strokes	(United States) Kris Tschetter
17	15 June 1997	Suntory Ladies Open	70-64-66-72=272	−16	7 strokes	(Japan) Miyuki Shimabukuro (Japan) Chikayo Yamazaki
18	13 May 2001	Vernal Ladies	73-73-70=216	E	Playoff	(Japan) Mineko Nasu
19	28 Jul 2002	Golf 5 Ladies	70-67-69=206	−10	1 stroke	(Japan) Hikaru Kobayashi
20	7 Sept 2003	Fujisankei Ladies Classic	66-68-68=202	−11	5 strokes	(Japan) Fuki Kido

Tournaments in bold denotes major tournaments in LPGA of Japan Tour.

=== Other wins (1) ===
- 1987 Malaysia Ladies Open (Kosaido Ladies Asia Golf Circuit)

=== Legends Tour wins (1) ===
No.	Year	Tournament	Winning score
1	2012	Fukuya Cup Madame Open	69-69=138 (−6)
