= Nasa Hataoka =

Japanese professional golfer (born 1999)

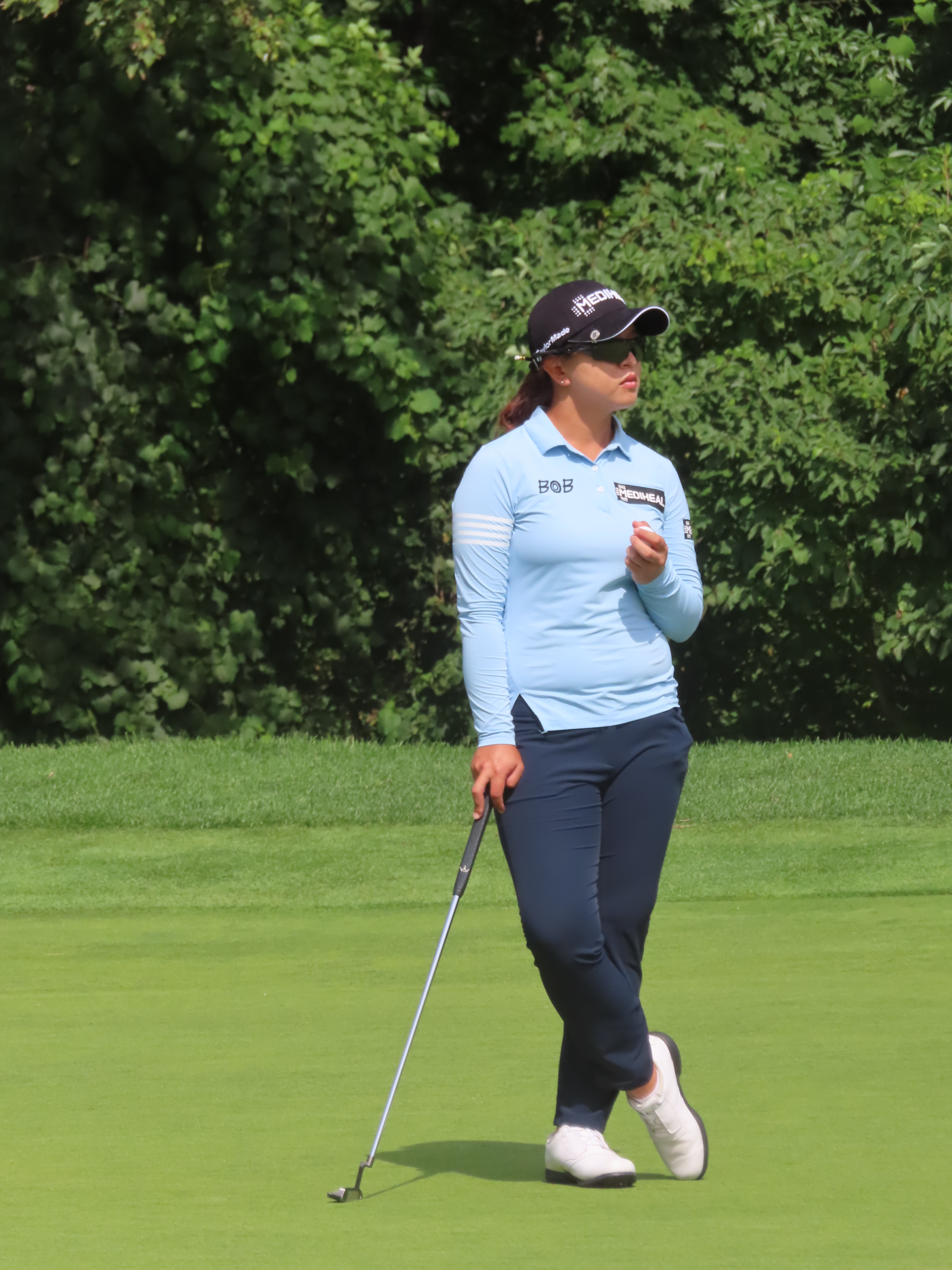
- Hataoka at the 2022 Dana Open

Personal information
- Nationality: Japan
- Born: 13 January 1999 (age 27) Kasama, Ibaraki, Japan
- Height: 158 cm (5 ft 2 in)

Career
- Sport: Golf
- Turned professional: 2016
- Current tour: LPGA Tour
- Former tour: LPGA of Japan Tour
- Professional wins: 12

Number of wins by tour
- LPGA Tour: 7
- LPGA of Japan Tour: 7

Best results in LPGA major championships
- Chevron Championship: T7: 2020
- Women's PGA C'ship: T2: 2018
- U.S. Women's Open: 2nd: 2021
- Women's British Open: T7: 2022
- Evian Championship: T3: 2023

Nasa Hataoka (畑岡 奈紗, Hataoka Nasa; born 13 January 1999) is a Japanese professional golfer. She has won seven times on the LPGA Tour and seven times on the LPGA of Japan Tour.

== Amateur career ==
Hataoka was born on 13 January 1999, named after the United States space program, NASA. As an amateur, she won the 2016 Japan Women's Open Golf Championship, a major tournament on the LPGA of Japan Tour. She was the youngest player and first amateur to win a JLPGA major. She turned professional after her victory and competed in the LPGA Final Qualifying Tournament. She finished 14th to earn her LPGA Tour card for 2017.

== Professional career ==
=== 2017 ===
In 2017, Hataoka played on both the LPGA Tour and LPGA of Japan Tour. On the LPGA Tour, she made 9 cuts in 17 events and finished 140th on the money list, losing her card. On the LPGA of Japan Tour, she won two events, including a second Japan Women's Open, and finished 14th on the money list. She again competed in the LPGA Final Qualifying Tournament, finishing first to re-earn her LPGA Tour card for 2018.

=== 2018 ===
Playing almost exclusively on the LPGA Tour in 2018, Hataoka won two events, the Walmart NW Arkansas Championship and the Toto Japan Classic, which was co-sanctioned with the JLPGA. Her Toto Japan Classic win took her into the top 10 of the Women's World Golf Rankings. At the 2018 KPMG Women's PGA Championship, Hataoka lost in a playoff to Park Sung-hyun. She also finished tied for 10th at the 2018 U.S. Women's Open. She finished the season 5th on the money list and 3rd on the Race to the CME Globe.

=== 2019 ===
On 31 March 2019, Hataoka won the Kia Classic at Aviara, closing with a 5-under-par 67 to clinch a three-stroke victory.

=== 2021 ===
In June 2021, Hataoka started the final round of the U.S. Women's Open in sixth place. She shot a final round 67 at The Olympic Club and got into a playoff with Yuka Saso. Saso won with a birdie on the third playoff hole.

Hataoka won her fourth LPGA Tour title, the Marathon Classic by six strokes, after 54 holes, because poor weather conditions made the course unplayable on Sunday, 11 July.

Hataoka won her fifth LPGA title, and the second time (2018) in the Walmart NW Arkansas Championship, at Rogers, Arkansas on 26 September, by a stroke, after 54 holes. Minjee Lee and Ji Eun-hee were tied for second place. She set the scoring record in the 2018 event. She is ranked third for a Japanese golfer in wins. With her $345,000 win, she rose to second place in the money ranking, trailing only number 1 world-ranked Nelly Korda.

=== 2022 ===
In 2022, she won the DIO Implant LA Open on 24 April, her sixth win on the LPGA Tour, and the $225,000 prize. Her world ranking jumped six places, from 12 to 6, which is where she ranked at the end of 2021. She had missed the cut in her previous tournament the week before at the Lotte Championship, but won by five strokes over Hannah Green. She had a six-stroke lead after the 17th hole with a chance to tie the tournament record at 268, but bogeying the 18th made it a 269. With a four-stroke lead going into the final round, her new ball position and swing change that weekend from a new coach, helped her miss only four fairways and seven greens.

== Amateur wins ==
- 2015 IMG Academy Junior World Championship, Kanto Junior Championship, Faldo Series Asia Japan Championship
- 2016 Faldo Series Asia Grand Final, Kanto Amateur Championship, Ciputra World Junior Championship, IMG Academy Junior World Championship

== Professional wins (12) ==
=== LPGA Tour wins (7) ===
No.	Date	Tournament	Winning score	To par	Margin of victory	Runner(s)-up	Winner's share ($)
1	24 Jun 2018	Walmart NW Arkansas Championship	64-65-63=192	−21	6 strokes	(United States) Austin Ernst	300,000
2	4 Nov 2018	Toto Japan Classic**^{a}**	66-69-67=202	−14	2 strokes	(Spain) Carlota Ciganda (Japan) Saki Nagamine (Japan) Momoko Ueda	225,000
3	31 Mar 2019	Kia Classic	69-70-64-67=270	−18	3 strokes	(United States) Danielle Kang (South Korea) Ko Jin-young (Spain) Azahara Muñoz (South Korea) Inbee Park (South Korea) Park Sung-hyun	270,000
4	11 Jul 2021	Marathon Classic**^{b}**	61-69-64=194	−19	6 strokes	(United States) Elizabeth Szokol (United States) Mina Harigae	300,000
5	26 Sep 2021	Walmart NW Arkansas Championship (2)	65-65-67=197	−16	1 stroke	(South Korea) Ji Eun-hee (Australia) Minjee Lee	345,000
6	24 Apr 2022	DIO Implant LA Open	67-68-67-67=269	−15	5 strokes	(Australia) Hannah Green	225,000
7	9 Nov 2025	Toto Japan Classic (2) **^{a}** **^{b}**	65-68-68=201	−15	Playoff	(Japan) Yuna Araki	315,000

^{a} Co-sanctioned by the LPGA of Japan Tour.
^{b} Reduced to 54 holes due to weather.

LPGA Tour playoff record (1–4)

No.	Year	Tournament	Opponents	Result
1	2018	Kingsmill Championship	(South Korea) Chun In-gee (Thailand) Ariya Jutanugarn	Jutanugarn won with birdie on second extra hole Chun eliminated by birdie on first hole
2	2018	**KPMG Women's PGA Championship**	(South Korea) Park Sung-hyun (South Korea) Ryu So-yeon	Park won with birdie on second extra hole. Hataoka eliminated by par on first extra hole.
3	2020	Diamond Resorts Tournament of Champions	(Mexico) Gaby López (South Korea) Inbee Park	López won with birdie on seventh extra hole Park eliminated by par on third hole
4	2021	**U.S. Women's Open**	(Philippines) Yuka Saso	Tied two-hole aggregate playoff Saso won with birdie on third playoff hole: Hataoka: 4-4=8 (E), 4, Saso: 4-4=8 (E), 3
5	2025	Toto Japan Classic	(Japan) Yuna Araki	Won with par on first extra hole

=== LPGA of Japan Tour wins (7) ===
No.	Date	Tournament	Winning score	To par	Margin of victory	Runner(s)-up
1	2 Oct 2016	**Japan Women's Open Golf Championship****^{a}**	70-72-70-68=280	−4	1 stroke	(Japan) Kotone Hori
2	24 Sep 2017	Miyagi TV Cup Dunlop Women's Open Golf Tournament	74-64-65=203	−13	4 strokes	(South Korea) Lee Ji-hee
3	1 Oct 2017	**Japan Women's Open Golf Championship**	67-68-68-65=268	−20	8 strokes	(South Korea) Jiyai Shin
4	4 Nov 2018	Toto Japan Classic**^{b}**	66-69-67=202	−14	2 strokes	(Spain) Carlota Ciganda (Japan) Saki Nagamine (Japan) Momoko Ueda
5	15 Sep 2019	**Japan LPGA Championship Konica Minolta Cup**	69-67-67-67=270	−18	8 strokes	(China) Shanshan Feng (Japan) Aoi Ohnishi
6	6 Oct 2019	**Japan Women's Open Golf Championship**	67-67-67-69=270	−18	4 strokes	(Japan) Eri Okayama (South Korea) Ryu So-yeon
7	9 Nov 2025	Toto Japan Classic**^{b}**	65-68-68=201	–15	Playoff	(Japan) Yuna Araki

^{a} Hataoka won the 2016 Japan Women's Open Golf Championship as an amateur.
^{b} Co-sanctioned by the LPGA Tour.
Tournaments in bold denotes major tournaments in LPGA of Japan Tour.

== Results in LPGA majors ==
Results not in chronological order.

Tournament	2017	2018	2019	2020	2021	2022	2023	2024	2025	2026
Chevron Championship		T48	T39	T7	T67	T17	T37	T13	T52	CUT
U.S. Women's Open		T10	CUT	T23	2	T28	T4	T44	CUT	T6
Women's PGA Championship	CUT	T2	T14	T3	CUT	T5	T47	CUT	T36	T15
The Evian Championship		T16	CUT	NT		T15	T3	CUT	T59	WD
Women's British Open		CUT	CUT	T64	T26	T7	T11	T37	T33	T44

Top 10
Did not play

CUT = missed the half-way cut
WD = withdrew
NT = no tournament
T = tied

=== Summary ===
Tournament	Wins	2nd	3rd	Top-5	Top-10	Top-25	Events	Cuts made
Chevron Championship	0	0	0	0	1	3	9	8
U.S. Women's Open	0	1	0	2	4	5	9	7
Women's PGA Championship	0	1	1	3	3	5	10	7
The Evian Championship	0	0	1	1	1	3	7	4
Women's British Open	0	0	0	0	1	2	9	7
Totals	0	2	2	6	10	18	44	33

- Most consecutive cuts made – 13 (2021 Women's British Open – 2024 U.S. Open)
- Longest streak of top-10s – 2 (three times)

== LPGA Tour career summary ==
Year	Tournaments played	Cuts made *	Wins	2nd	3rd	Top 10s	Best finish	Earnings ($)	Money list rank	Scoring average	Scoring rank
2016	1	1	0	0	0	0	T50	n/a	n/a	74.00	n/a
2017	19	8	0	0	0	0	15	37,852	140	72.67	137
2018	24	21	2	2	0	11	1	1,454,261	5	70.10	10
2019	20	16	1	2	1	6	1	917,273	18	70.31	18
2020	12	12	0	2	1	5	T2	854,024	5	70.11	5
2021	21	16	2	2	0	5	1	1,901,081	3	70.46	25
2022	25	24	1	0	0	7	1	1,402,138	13	69.94	14
2023	23	22	0	1	1	7	T2	1,988,216	8	70.16	9
2024	26	21	0	0	1	6	T3	956,586	37	70.97	30
2025	23	21	1	1	1	8	1	1,579,999	20	69.92	8
Totals^	193 (2017)	161 (2017)	7	10	5	55	1	11,091,430	26		

^ Official as of 2025 season
* Includes matchplay and other tournaments without a cut.

== World ranking ==
Position in Women's World Golf Rankings at the end of each calendar year.

Year	Ranking	Source
2017	44	
2018	7	
2019	6	
2020	7	
2021	6	
2022	10	
2023	17	
2024	34	
2025	18	

== Team appearances ==
Amateur

- Espirito Santo Trophy (representing Japan): 2016
- Patsy Hankins Trophy (representing Asia/Pacific): 2016 (winners)

Professional

- International Crown (representing Japan): 2018, 2023
- Amata Friendship Cup (representing Japan): 2018
