= Junko Yasui =

Japanese professional golfer (born 1973)

Junko Yasui 安井 純子
Personal information
- Nationality: Japan
- Born: 25 July 1960 (age 66) Himeji, Hyōgo Prefecture, Japan
- Height: 5 ft .2 in (1.53 m)

Career
- Sport: Golf
- Turned professional: 1985
- Former tour: LPGA of Japan Tour
- Professional wins: 15

Number of wins by tour
- LPGA of Japan Tour: 15

Junko Yasui (Japanese: 安井 純子, Hepburn: Yasui Junko; born 25 July 1960) is a professional golfer from Hyōgo Prefecture, Japan. She studied under Kosaku Shimada and is a mentor to Nobuko Onizawa, among others.

Yasui began playing golf at the age of 21 after graduating from Hyogo Prefectural Himeji Higashi High School. On 13 September 1984, she passed the professional exam and entered 47th class of the Ladies Professional Golfers' Association of Japan (LPGA of Japan) the following year, on 1 March 1985.

In 1988, she won her first tour title at the Fujisankei Ladies Classic.

In 1991, she scored two holes-in-one; one during the Daikin Orchid Ladies Golf Tournament and the other while competing in the Yamaha Cup Ladies Open.

Yasui won four consecutive championships in playoffs in 1995 (Fujisankei Ladies Classic), 1999 (Kosaido Ladies Golf Cup and Sumitomo VISA Pacific Club Ladies), and 2000 (Toyo Suisan Ladies Hokkaido).

Throughout her career, Yasui has often been among the top ranked in prize money earned. As of 2025, she ranks No.33, with ¥533,347,024 in lifetime winnings.

== Professional wins (15) ==
=== LPGA of Japan Tour wins (15) ===
No.	Date	Tournament	Winning score	To par	Margin of victory	Runner(s)-up
1	4 Sep 1988	Fujisankei Ladies Classic	66-73-71=210	−9	1 stroke	(United States) Cindy Rarick
2	16 Apr 1989	Tokushima Tsukinomiya Ladies Classic Open	69-72-74=215	−1	Playoff	(Japan) Reiko Kashiwado
3	1 Apr 1990	Tohato Ladies Golf Tournament	68-72-74=214	−2	Playoff	(Japan) Kayoko Yamaguchi
4	15 Apr 1990	Tokushima Tsukinomiya Ladies Classic Open	65-69-70=204	−12	Playoff	(Japan) Reiko Kashiwado (Japan) Ikuyo Shiotani (Japan) Erika Nakajima (Japan) Norimi Terasawa
5	15 Jul 1990	Asahi International Ladies	68-66-75=209	−7	2 strokes	(Japan) Fukumi Tani (Japan) Norimi Terazawa
6	29 Jul 1990	Stanley Ladies Golf Tournament	70-67-71=208	−8	1 stroke	(Taiwan) Huang Yueh-chyn
7	7 Apr 1991	Tohato Ladies Golf Tournament	70-68-33=171	−9	7 strokes	(Taiwan) Tu Ai-yu
8	23 Jun 1991	Dunlop Ladies Open Golf	74-68-70-71=283	−5	3 strokes	(Japan) Yuko Moriguchi
9	22 Nov 1992	Daio Paper Elleair Women's Open Golf Tournament	66-71-70=207	−9	6 strokes	(Japan) Tomiko Ikebuchi (Japan) Miyuki Shimabukuro (England) Laura Davies
10	3 Sep 1995	Fujisankei Ladies Classic	69-73=142	−4	Playoff	(Japan) Akira Nakano
11	30 May 1999	Kosaido Ladies Golf Cup	73-70-72=215	−1	Playoff	(Japan) Miyuki Shimabukuro
12	25 Jul 1999	Sumitomo VISA Pacific Club Ladies	70-72-68=210	−6	2 strokes	(Japan) Aki Takamura
13	16 Jul 2000	Toyo Suisan Ladies Hokkaido	66-64-74=204	−12	4 strokes	(Japan) Mineko Nasu
14	20 Aug 2000	New Caterpillar Mitsubishi Ladies	72-68-75=215	−4	Playoff	(Japan) Mineko Nasu
15	1 Oct 2000	Friskies Osaka Women's Open Golf Tournament	68-71-69=208	−8	Playoff	(Japan) Orie Fujino
