= Rio Takeda =

Japanese professional golfer (born 2003)

Rio Takeda 竹田 麗央
Personal information
- Nationality: Japan
- Born: 2 April 2003 (age 23) Kōshi, Kumamoto, Japan
- Height: 167 cm (5 ft 6 in)

Career
- Sport: Golf
- Turned professional: 2022
- Current tours: LPGA of Japan Tour (joined 2022); LPGA Tour (joined 2025)
- Professional wins: 9

Number of wins by tour
- LPGA Tour: 2
- LPGA of Japan Tour: 8

Best results in LPGA major championships
- Chevron Championship: T12: 2026
- Women's PGA C'ship: T23: 2025
- U.S. Women's Open: T2: 2025
- Women's British Open: T4: 2025
- Evian Championship: T11: 2025

Achievements and awards
- LPGA of Japan Tour Player of the Year: 2024
- LPGA of Japan Tour leading money winner: 2024

Rio Takeda (竹田 麗央, Takeda Rio) (born 2 April 2003) is a Japanese professional golfer. She plays on the LPGA Tour and the LPGA of Japan Tour where she has 8 wins.

== Career ==
Takeda was born in Kōshi, Kumamoto in 2003 and started playing golf when she was six years old. She enjoyed success as an amateur and won the 39th Kyushu Junior Golf Championship.

In the fall of 2021, Takeda won the low amateur title at the 54th Japan Women's Open Golf Championship. The distinction earned her a spot in the final qualifying for the LPGA of Japan Tour, where she finished 5th. She turned professional and joined the tour for the 2022 season.

In the spring of 2024, Takeda captured the KKT Cup Vantelin Ladies Open and Fujisankei Ladies Classic back-to-back, for her first two wins on the JLPGA.

She entered her first major in the 2024 U.S. Women's Open at Lancaster Country Club, where she finished top-10.

== Personal life ==
Her mother, Satoko Hirase is a former professional golfer. So is her aunt, Mayumi Hirase, who has 18 wins on the LPGA of Japan Tour (1989–2000) and one LPGA Tour win in 1996.

== Professional wins (9) ==
=== LPGA Tour wins (2) ===
No.	Date	Tournament	Winning score	To par	Margin of victory	Runner-up
1	3 Nov 2024	Toto Japan Classic^{[1]}	69-65-67=201	−15	Playoff	(United States) Marina Alex
2	9 Mar 2025	Blue Bay LPGA	69-69-69-64=271	−17	6 strokes	(Australia) Minjee Lee

^{1} Co-sanctioned by the LPGA of Japan Tour.

LPGA Tour playoff record (1–0)

No.	Year	Tournament	Opponent	Result
1	2024	Toto Japan Classic	(United States) Marina Alex	Won with birdie on sixth extra hole

=== LPGA of Japan Tour wins (8) ===
No.	Date	Tournament	Winning score	To par	Margin of victory	Runner(s)-up
1	14 Apr 2024	KKT Cup Vantelin Ladies Open	73-66-70=209	−7	2 strokes	(South Korea) Lee Min-young (Japan) Ai Suzuki (Japan) Karen Tsuruoka
2	21 Apr 2024	Fujisankei Ladies Classic	67-67-67=201	−12	3 strokes	(Japan) Mitsuki Kobayashi
3	19 May 2024	Bridgestone Ladies Open	67-67-72-68=274	−14	2 strokes	(Japan) Yui Kawamoto (Japan) Miyū Yamashita
4	4 Aug 2024	Hokkaido Meiji Cup	68-70-66=204	−12	1 stroke	(Japan) Yui Kawamoto
5	1 Sep 2024	Golf5 Ladies Professional Golf Tournament	68-66=134	−10	1 stroke	(Japan) Hinako Yamauchi
6	8 Sep 2024	**Sony JLPGA Championship**	64-67-69-69=269	−19	1 stroke	(Japan) Miyū Yamashita
7	29 Sep 2024	**Japan Women's Open Golf Championship**	72-69-67-70=278	−10	2 strokes	(Japan) Akie Iwai
8	3 Nov 2024	Toto Japan Classic^{[2]}	69-65-67=201	−15	Playoff	(United States) Marina Alex

^{2} Co-sanctioned by the LPGA Tour.
Tournaments in bold denotes major tournaments in LPGA of Japan Tour.

== Results in LPGA majors ==
Tournament	2024	2025	2026
Chevron Championship		T59	T12
U.S. Women's Open	T9	T2	T45
Women's PGA Championship	T32	T23	CUT
The Evian Championship	T55	T11	CUT
Women's British Open	CUT	T4	T6

Top 10
Did not play

CUT = missed the half-way cut
"T" = tied

=== Summary ===
Tournament	Wins	2nd	3rd	Top-5	Top-10	Top-25	Events	Cuts made
Chevron Championship	0	0	0	0	0	1	2	2
U.S. Women's Open	0	1	0	1	2	2	3	3
Women's PGA Championship	0	0	0	0	0	1	3	2
The Evian Championship	0	0	0	0	0	1	3	2
Women's British Open	0	0	0	1	2	2	3	2
Totals	0	1	0	2	4	7	14	11

== Team appearances ==
Professional

- International Crown (representing Japan): 2025
