= Ko Woo-soon =

South Korean professional golfer (born 1964)

Ko Woo-soon 고우순
Personal information
- Nationality: South Korea
- Born: 21 April 1964 (age 62)
- Height: 1.69 m (5 ft 7 in)

Career
- Sport: Golf
- Turned professional: 1993
- Former tour: LPGA of Japan Tour
- Professional wins: 11

Number of wins by tour
- LPGA Tour: 2
- LPGA of Japan Tour: 8
- LPGA of Korea Tour: 3

Best results in LPGA major championships
- Chevron Championship: T11: 2003
- Women's PGA C'ship: DNP
- U.S. Women's Open: CUT: 1995, 1996
- du Maurier Classic: DNP
- Women's British Open: T54: 2003

Ko Woo-soon (Korean: 고우순, born 21 April 1964), also known as Woo-Soon Ko, is a South Korean professional golfer.

Ko won twice on the LPGA Tour in 1994 and 1995, both as a non-member.

== Professional wins (11) ==
=== LPGA of Korea Tour wins (3) ===
- 1988 (1) Korea Women's Open
- 1989 (1) Korea Women's Open
- 1991 (1) Korea Women's Open

=== LPGA of Japan Tour wins (8) ===
- 1994 (2) Kibun Ladies Classic, Toray Japan Queens Cup (co-sanctioned with LPGA Tour)
- 1995 (1) Toray Japan Queens Cup (co-sanctioned with LPGA Tour)
- 1997 (2) Daikin Orchid Ladies, Nasu-Ogawa Ladies Pro-Golf Tournament
- 2000 (1) Hisako Higuchi Kibun Classic
- 2002 (2) **Japan Women's Open Golf Championship**, **Japan LPGA Tour Championship**

Tournament in bold denotes major championships in LPGA of Japan Tour.

=== LPGA Tour wins (2) ===
No.	Date	Tournament	Winning score	Margin of victory	Runner(s)-up
1	6 Nov 1994	Toray Japan Queens Cup	−7 (65-71-70=206)	Playoff	(United States) Betsy King
2	5 Nov 1995	Toray Japan Queens Cup	−9 (69-67-71=207)	2 strokes	(Japan) Toshimi Kimura (Japan) Hiromi Kobayashi

LPGA Tour playoff record (1–0)

No.	Year	Tournament	Opponent	Result
1	1994	Toray Japan Queens Cup	(United States) Betsy King	Won with par on first extra hole
