= Shoko Sasaki =

Japanese professional golfer

Personal information
- Nationality: Japan
- Born: 8 June 1996 (age 30) Kakogawa, Hyōgo, Japan
- Height: 1.70 m (5 ft 7 in)

Career
- Sport: Golf
- Turned professional: 2015
- Current tour: LPGA of Japan Tour
- Professional wins: 3

Number of wins by tour
- LPGA of Japan Tour: 3

Shoko Sasaki (ささきしょうこ; born 8 June 1996 in Kakogawa, Hyōgo) is a Japanese professional golfer. She plays on the LPGA of Japan Tour where she was won three times.

== Professional wins (3) ==
=== LPGA of Japan Tour wins (3) ===
No.	Date	Tournament	Winning score	To par	Margin of victory	Runner(s)-up	Ref.
1	31 Jul 2016	Daito Kentaku Eheyanet Ladies	71-67-69=207	−9	3 strokes	(Japan) Eri Okayama	
2	7 Oct 2018	Stanley Ladies Golf Tournament	73-65-68=206	−10	1 stroke	(Japan) Hina Aragaki (South Korea) Jeon Mi-jeong	
3	28 Oct 2018	Hisako Higuchi Mitsubishi Electric Ladies Golf Tournament	69-67-68=204	−12	2 strokes	(Japan) Sakura Koiwai	
