= Yakult Ladies Golf Tournament =

Golf tournament

Tournament information
- Location: Munakata City, Fukuoka Prefecture
- Established: 1980
- Course(s): Fukuoka International Country Club
- Tour(s): LPGA of Japan Tour
- Final year: 1999

Final champion
- (Japan) Fumiko Muraguchi

The Yakult Ladies Golf Tournament (Japanese: ヤクルトレディースゴルフトーナメント) was a professional women's golf tournament sponsored by Yakult Honsha and recognized by the Ladies Professional Golfers' Association of Japan (LPGA of Japan). The event was held annually between 1980 and 1999 at the Fukuoka International Country Club in Munakata City, Fukuoka Prefecture. Initially, the event was titled the Yakult Mirumiru Ladies (Japanese: ヤクルトミルミルレディースゴルフトーナメント). The name was changed for the 1990 tournament.

== Winners ==
| Year | Winner | Ref. |
Yakult Mirumiru Ladies
| 1980 | (Japan) Atsuko Hikage | |
| 1981 | (Japan) Yuko Moriguchi | |
| 1982 | (Taiwan) Yueh-chyn Huang | |
| 1983 | (Japan) Yuko Moriguchi | |
| 1984 | (Japan) Ritsu Imahori | |
| 1985 | (Japan) Atsuko Hikage | |
| 1986 | (Taiwan) Tu Ai-yu | |
| 1987 | (Japan) Atsuko Hikage | |
| 1988 | (Japan) Kayoko Yamaguchi | |
| 1989 | (Japan) Ikuyo Shiotani | |
Yakult Ladies
| 1990 | (Japan) Chikayo Yamazaki | |
| 1991 | (Japan) Yuko Moriguchi | |
| 1992 | (Australia) Jennifer Sevil | |
| 1993 | (Japan) Aiko Takasu | |
| 1994 | (Japan) Kaori Higo | |
| 1995 | (Japan) Akiko Fukushima | |
| 1996 | (Japan) Harada Kaori | |
| 1997 | (Japan) Tomiko Ikebuchi | |
| 1998 | (Japan) Aiko Takasu | |
| 1999 | (Japan) Fumiko Muraguchi | |
