= Song Bo-bae =

South Korean professional golfer (born 1986)

Personal information
- Nationality: South Korea
- Born: 22 February 1986 (age 40) Seogwipo, South Korea
- Height: 1.68 m (5 ft 6 in)

Career
- Sport: Golf
- Turned professional: 2004
- Former tours: LPGA of Korea Tour; LPGA of Japan Tour
- Professional wins: 9

Number of wins by tour
- LPGA Tour: 1
- Ladies European Tour: 1
- LPGA of Japan Tour: 3
- LPGA of Korea Tour: 6

Best results in LPGA major championships
- Chevron Championship: T55: 2005
- Women's PGA C'ship: CUT: 2005
- U.S. Women's Open: DNP
- Women's British Open: T34: 2008
- Evian Championship: DNP

- Song Bo-bae
- Hangul: 송보배
- RR: Song Bobae
- MR: Song Pobae

Song Bo-bae (Korean: 송보배, born 22 February 1986) is a South Korean professional golfer who played on the LPGA of Japan Tour and LPGA of Korea Tour.

== Career ==
Song has won several times on the LPGA of Korea Tour and LPGA of Japan Tour including the 2005 Samsung Ladies Masters co-sanctioned by the Ladies European Tour and the 2009 Mizuno Classic co-sanctioned by the LPGA Tour.

== Professional wins (9) ==
=== LPGA Tour wins (1) ===
No.	Date	Tournament	Winning score	Margin of victory	Runners-up
1	8 Nov 2009	Mizuno Classic	−15 (68-65-68=201)	3 strokes	(United States) Brittany Lang (Mexico) Lorena Ochoa (South Korea) Hee-Young Park

=== Ladies European Tour wins (1) ===
- 2005 (1) Samsung Ladies Masters (co-sanctioned with LPGA of Korea Tour)

=== LPGA of Japan Tour wins (3) ===
- 2008 (1) Daikin Orchid Ladies
- 2009 (2) Japan Women's Open, Mizuno Classic (co-sanctioned with LPGA Tour)

=== LPGA of Korea Tour wins (6) ===
- 2003 (1) Korea Women's Open (as an amateur)
- 2004 (2) Korea Women's Open, SK EnClean Invitational
- 2005 (2) Samsung Ladies Masters (co-sanctioned with Ladies European Tour), Pyongyang Women's Open
- 2006 (1) Lakeside Ladies Open

== Team appearances ==
Professional

- World Cup (representing South Korea): 2005, 2006
