= Samsung Ladies Masters =

Golf tournament

Tournament information
- Location: Singapore
- Established: 2005
- Courses: Laguna National G&CC
- Par: 72
- Tours: Ladies European Tour; LPGA of Korea Tour
- Format: Stroke play
- Final year: 2005

Tournament record score
- Aggregate: 206 Song Bo-bae (2005)
- To par: −10 as above

Final champion
- (South Korea) Song Bo-bae

The Samsung Ladies Masters was a women's professional golf tournament co-sanctioned by the LPGA of Korea Tour and the Ladies European Tour that took place in Singapore at the Laguna National G&CC. It was only held in 2005.

== Winners ==
Year	Winner	Country	Score	To par	Margin of victory	Runner-up
2005	Song Bo-bae	South Korea	206	−10	1 stroke	(Sweden) Charlotta Sörenstam
