= Japan LPGA Tour Championship =

Japan LPGA Tour Championship Ricoh Cup
Tournament information
- Location: Miyazaki, Miyazaki
- Established: 1979
- Course: Miyazaki Country Club
- Par: 72
- Length: 6,451 yards (5,899 m)
- Tour: LPGA of Japan Tour
- Format: Stroke play
- Prize fund: ¥100 million
- Month played: November

Current champion
- (Japan) Ai Suzuki

Japan LPGA Tour Championship Ricoh Cup is the final event of golf's LPGA of Japan Tour season. It is usually played in November and in recent years at the Miyazaki Country Club, Miyazaki, Miyazaki. It was founded in 1979. The winner receives an invite to the next year's Women's British Open.

== Tournament hosts ==
Years	Venue	Location
1979–1982	Kawaguchiko Country Club	Kawaguchiko, Yamanashi
1983–1992	Oak Hills Country Club	Katori, Chiba
1993–1997	Aoshima Golf Club	Miyazaki, Miyazaki
1998–2002	Hibiscus Golf Club	Miyazaki, Miyazaki
2003–present	Miyazaki Country Club	Miyazaki, Miyazaki

== Course ==
Miyazaki Country Club in 2014

Hole	1	2	3	4	5	6	7	8	9	Out	10	11	12	13	14	15	16	17	18	In	Total
Yards	362	559	412	358	160	360	397	185	480	3,273	341	495	180	495	383	413	171	317	400	3,155	6,428
Par	4	5	4	4	3	4	4	3	5	36	4	5	3	5	4	3	3	4	4	36	72

== Winners ==
Year	Player	Country	Score	Purse (¥)	Winner's share (¥)	Ref
LPGA Tour Championship Ricoh Cup
2025	Ai Suzuki	Japan	279 (−9)	120,000,000	30,000,000	
2024	Shiho Kuwaki	Japan	276 (−12)	120,000,000	30,000,000	
2023	Miyū Yamashita (2)	Japan	278 (−10)	120,000,000	30,000,000	
2022	Miyū Yamashita	Japan	273 (−15)	120,000,000	30,000,000	
2021	Kana Mikashima	Japan	277 (−11)	120,000,000	30,000,000	
2020	Erika Hara	Japan	278 (−10)	120,000,000	30,000,000	
2019	Bae Seon-woo	South Korea	277 (−11)	120,000,000	30,000,000	
2018	Jiyai Shin (2)	South Korea	277 (−11)	100,000,000	25,000,000	
2017	Teresa Lu (2)	Taiwan	273 (−15)	100,000,000	25,000,000	
2016	Kim Ha-neul	South Korea	279 (−9)	100,000,000	25,000,000	
2015	Jiyai Shin	South Korea	281 (−7)	100,000,000	25,000,000	
2014	Teresa Lu	Taiwan	278 (−10)	100,000,000	25,000,000	
2013	Shiho Oyama (2)	Japan	279 (−9)	100,000,000	25,000,000	
2012	Lee Bo-mee	South Korea	275 (−13)	100,000,000	25,000,000	
2011	Jeon Mi-jeong	South Korea	280 (−8)	100,000,000	25,000,000	
2010	Inbee Park	South Korea	287 (−1)	100,000,000	25,000,000	
2009	Sakura Yokomine (2)	Japan	282 (−6)	100,000,000	25,000,000	
2008	Miho Koga (2)	Japan	282 (−6)	100,000,000	25,000,000	
2007	Miho Koga	Japan	275 (−13)	100,000,000	25,000,000	
2006	Sakura Yokomine	Japan	277 (−11)		15,000,000	
2005	Shiho Oyama	Japan	283 (−5)		15,000,000	
2004	Yuri Fudoh (2)	Japan	286 (−2)		15,000,000	
2003	Yuri Fudoh	Japan	279 (−9)		15,000,000	
2002	Ko Woo-soon	South Korea	278 (−6)		15,000,000	
2001	Kaori Higo (2)	Japan	275 (−13)		15,000,000	
2000	Akira Nakano (2)	Japan	282 (−6)^{PO}		15,000,000	
JLPGA Meiji Dairies Cup
1999	Kaori Higo	Japan	275 (−13)		10,800,000	
1998	Lee Young-Me	South Korea	274 (−14)		10,800,000	
1997	Akiko Fukushima	Japan	283 (−5)		10,800,000	
1996	Yoko Inoue	Japan	281 (−7)		10,800,000	
1995	Ikuyo Shiotani	Japan	215 (−1)^{PO}		9,000,000	
1994	Mayumi Hirase (2)	Japan	208 (−8)		9,000,000	
1993	Kaori Harada	Japan	215 (−1)		9,000,000	
1992	Akira Nakano	Japan	212 (−4)		9,000,000	
1991	Ku Ok-hee	South Korea	209 (−7)		9,000,000	
1990	Aiko Takase	Japan	211 (−5)		7,200,000	
JLPGA Lady Borden Cup
1989	Mayumi Hirase	Japan	211 (−5)^{PO}		6,000,000	
1988	Huang Yueh-chyn	Taiwan	217 (+1)		5,000,000	
1987	Yuko Moriguchi (3)	Japan	208 (−8)		5,000,000	
1986	Tatsuko Ohsako (2)	Japan	205 (−11)		5,000,000	
1985	Yuko Moriguchi (2)	Japan	210 (−6)		4,000,000	
1984	Tatsuko Ohsako	Japan	210 (−6)		4,000,000	
1983	Tu Ai-yu (3)	Taiwan	211 (−5)		3,000,000	
1982	Tu Ai-yu (2)	Taiwan	212 (−4)		3,000,000	
1981	Yuko Moriguchi	Japan	214 (−1)		2,500,000	
1980	Nayoko Yoshikawa	Japan	214 (−1)		2,500,000	
1979	Tu Ai-yu	Taiwan	147 (+3)	10,000,000	2,000,000	
