= 1977 LPGA Championship =

Coordinates: 33.872°N 78.661°W

Tournament information
- Dates: June 9–12, 1977
- Location: North Myrtle Beach, South Carolina
- Courses: Bay Tree Golf Plantation; Gold Course
- Tour: LPGA Tour
- Format: Stroke play – 72 holes

Statistics
- Par: 72
- Length: 6,074 yards (5,554 m)
- Field: 99 players, 64 after cut
- Cut: 154 (+10)
- Prize fund: $150,000
- Winner's share: $22,500

Champion
- (Japan) Chako Higuchi
- 287 (−5)

Location in the United States
Location in South Carolina

The 1977 LPGA Championship was the 23rd LPGA Championship, played June 9–12, 1977 at the Gold Course of Bay Tree Golf Plantation in North Myrtle Beach, South Carolina.

Chako Higuchi won her only major title, three strokes ahead of runners-up Pat Bradley, Sandra Post, and Judy Rankin.

The purse was nearly tripled this year to $150,000, up from $55,000 in 1976.

It was the first golf major to be held in South Carolina. The Bay Tree Golf Plantation courses were closed and abandoned in 2006. Since then, the Senior PGA Championship (2007), PGA Championship (2012, 2021, 2031) (all at Kiawah Island Golf Resort's The Ocean Course), and the U.S. Women's Open (2019, Country Club of Charleston) have been held or are scheduled to be conducted in the state, with all four in the Charleston market.

== Final leaderboard ==
Sunday, June 12, 1977

Place	Player	Score	To par	Money ($)
1	(Japan) Chako Higuchi	71-67-72-69=279	−9	22,500
T2	(United States) Pat Bradley	71-71-68-72=282	−6	10,953
T2	(Canada) Sandra Post	72-72-69-69=282	−6	10,953
T2	(United States) Judy Rankin	68-73-69-72=282	−6	10,953
T5	(United States) JoAnne Carner	71-77-70-65=283	−5	5,715
T5	(United States) Joyce Kazmierski	69-76-71-67=283	−5	5,715
T7	(Argentina) Silvia Bertolaccini	75-69-70-70=284	−4	4,376
T7	(United States) Donna Caponi Young	77-67-73-67=284	−4	4,376
T7	(United States) Sandra Palmer	72-71-71-70=284	−4	4,376
10	(United States) Kathy Whitworth	73-70-71-72=286	E	3,170
