= Saki Nagamine =

Japanese professional golfer (born 1995)

Saki Nagamine 永峰 咲希
Personal information
- Nationality: Japan
- Born: 28 April 1995 (age 31) Miyazaki, Japan
- Height: 158 cm (5 ft 2 in)

Career
- Sport: Golf
- Turned professional: 2014
- Current tour: LPGA of Japan Tour
- Professional wins: 4

Number of wins by tour
- LPGA of Japan Tour: 4

Saki Nagamine (永峰 咲希, Nagamine Saki) (born 28 April 1995) is a Japanese professional golfer. She plays on the LPGA of Japan Tour where she has four wins.

== Career ==
She captured the 2018 Fujisankei Ladies Classic for her maiden win on the JLPGA.

== Professional wins (4) ==
=== LPGA of Japan Tour wins (4) ===
No.	Date	Tournament	Winning score	To par	Margin of victory	Runner(s)-up
1	23 Apr 2018	Fujisankei Ladies Classic	65-72-66=203	−10	Playoff	(Japan) Erika Kikuchi
2	13 Sep 2020	**Japan LPGA Championship Konica Minolta Cup**	69-70-68-69=276	−12	1 stroke	(South Korea) Nari Lee (Japan) Ayako Kimura (Japan) Hikari Tanabe
3	6 Jul 2025	Shiseido-JAL Ladies Open	67-73-69-70=279	−9	Playoff	(Japan) Megumi Kido
4	29 Mar 2026	AXA Ladies Golf Tournament in Miyazaki	70-67-66=203	−13	2 strokes	(South Korea) Jiyai Shin

Tournaments in bold denotes major tournaments in LPGA of Japan Tour.
