= Japan LPGA Championship =

Golf tournament

Tournament information
- Location: Rotates
- Established: 1968
- Course: Rotates
- Tour: LPGA of Japan Tour
- Format: Stroke play
- Prize fund: ¥200,000,000
- Month played: September

Current champion
- (Japan) Miyū Yamashita

The Japan LPGA Championship (日本女子プロゴルフ選手権大会, Nihon Josi Puro Gorufu Senshuken Taikai), is one of the longest running tournaments in the history of the Japan Ladies Professional Golf Association, surpassed only by the Japan Women's Open. The title sponsor has changed to the Sony Group from 2024 from the Konica-Minolta Group. Accordingly, the tournament title has been changed to the Sony JLPGA Championship. It is one of four majors on the LPGA of Japan Tour.

== Winners ==
Year	Champion	Venue	Location	Score	To par	Purse (¥)	Winner's share (¥)
Sony JLPGA Championship
2026	(Japan) Miyū Yamashita	Katayamazu Golf Club, Hakusan Course	Kaga, Ishikawa	279	−9	200,000,000	36,000,000
2025	(Japan) Shina Kanazawa	Ōarai Golf Club	Ōarai, Ibaraki	278	−10	200,000,000	36,000,000
2024	(Japan) Rio Takeda	Kanehide Kise Country Club	Nago, Okinawa	276	−12	200,000,000	36,000,000
Japan LPGA Championship Konica Minolta Cup
2023	(Japan) Sora Kamiya	Passage Kinkai Island Golf Club	Nagasaki, Nagasaki	269	−19	200,000,000	36,000,000
2022	(Japan) Haruka Kawasaki	Jōyō Country Club	Jōyō, Kyoto	272	−16	200,000,000	36,000,000
2021	(Japan) Mone Inami	Shizu Hills Country Club	Naka, Ibaraki	269	−19	200,000,000	36,000,000
2020	(Japan) Saki Nagamine	JFE Setonaikai Golf Club	Kasaoka, Okayama	276	−12	200,000,000	36,000,000
2019	(Japan) Nasa Hataoka	Cherry Hills Golf Club	Miki, Hyōgo	270	−18	200,000,000	36,000,000
2018	(South Korea) Jiyai Shin	Kosugi Country Club	Imizu, Toyama	272	−16	200,000,000	36,000,000
2017	(South Korea) Lee Ji-hee	Appikogen Country Club	Hachimantai, Iwate	279	−5	200,000,000	36,000,000
2016	(Japan) Ai Suzuki	Noboribetsu Country Club	Noboribetsu, Hokkaido	289	+1	140,000,000	25,200,000
2015	(Taiwan) Teresa Lu	Passage Kinkai Island Golf Club	Nagasaki, Nagasaki	281	−7	140,000,000	25,200,000
2014	(Japan) Ai Suzuki	Minagi Golf Club	Miki, Hyōgo	283	−5	140,000,000	25,200,000
2013	(South Korea) Lee Bo-mee	Eniwa Country Club	Eniwa, Hokkaido	205	−11	140,000,000	18,900,000
2012	(Japan) Chie Arimura	Tarao County Club, West Course	Koka, Shiga	275	−13	140,000,000	25,200,000
2011	(Japan) Yuko Mitsuka	King Fields Golf Club	Ichihara, Chiba	282	−6	140,000,000	25,200,000
2010	(Japan) Saiki Fujita	Grandage Golf Club	Yoshino, Nara	275	−13	140,000,000	25,200,000
2009	(Japan) Shinobu Moromizato	Gifuseki Country Club	Seki, Gifu	282	−6	140,000,000	25,200,000
2008	(South Korea) Shin Hyun-ju	Katayamazu Golf Club, Hakusan Course	Kaga, Ishikawa	283	−5	100,000,000	18,000,000
2007	(Japan) Akane Iijima	Regus Crest Golf Club, Grand Course	Akitakata, Hiroshima	274	−14	100,000,000	18,000,000
2006	(Japan) Ai Miyazato	Nidom Classic Course, Nispa Course	Tomakomai, Hokkaido	282	−6	100,000,000	18,000,000
2005	(Japan) Yuri Fudoh	Meishin Youkaichi Country Club	Higashiomi, Shiga	278	−10	70,000,000	12,600,000
2004	(Japan) Kaori Higo	Taiheiyo Club and Associates, Mashiko Course	Mashiko, Tochigi	281	−7	70,000,000	12,600,000
2003	(Japan) Yuri Fudoh	Taiheiyo Club and Associates, Konan Course	Kumagaya, Saitama	277	−11	70,000,000	12,600,000
Japan LPGA Championship Konica Cup
2002	(South Korea) Ku Ok-hee	Taiheiyo Club, Rokko Course	Miki, Hyōgo	283	−5	70,000,000	12,600,000
2001	(Japan) Kumiko Hiyoshi	Rope Club	Shioya, Tochigi	282	−6	70,000,000	12,600,000
2000	(Japan) Aki Takamura	Liberal Hills Golf Club	Tomioka, Fukushima	287	−1	70,000,000	12,600,000
1999	(Japan) Fuki Kido	Biwako Country Club	Ritto, Shiga	281	−7	70,000,000	12,600,000
1998	(Japan) Michiko Hattori	Miho Golf Club	Miho, Ibaraki	290	+2	70,000,000	12,600,000
1997	(Japan) Akiko Fukushima	Fuji Country Shuga Club	Kani, Gifu	283	−9	70,000,000	12,600,000
Japan LPGA Championship
1996	(Japan) Ikuyo Shiotani	Nagaoka Country Club	Nagaoka, Niigata	283	−5	65,000,000	11,700,000
1995	(Japan) Aki Takamura	The Classic Golf Club	Miyawaka, Fukuoka	282	−6	65,000,000	11,700,000
1994	(Japan) Kumiko Hiyoshi	Hotaka Country Club	Azumino, Nagano	285	−3	65,000,000	11,700,000
1993	(Japan) Kaori Harada	Asahikokusai Hamamura Onsen Golf Club	Tottori, Tottori	284	−4	65,000,000	11,700,000
1992	(South Korea) Ku Ok-hee	Hirakawa Country Club	Chiba, Chiba	285	−3	60,000,000	10,800,000
1991	(Japan) Tatsuko Ohsako	Asahikokusai Tojo Country Club	Katō, Hyōgo	213	−3	60,000,000	8,100,000
1990	(Japan) Ayako Okamoto	Koryo Country Club	Kanuma, Tochigi	282	−6	45,000,000	8,100,000
1989	(Japan) Fukumi Tani	Ogane Golf Club	Nasukarasuyama, Tochigi	276	−12	40,000,000	7,000,000
1988	(Japan) Tatsuko Ohsako	ABC Golf Club	Katō, Hyōgo	281	−7	40,000,000	7,000,000
1987	(Japan) Fusako Nagata	Asahigaoka Country Club	Tochigi, Tochigi	281	−7	40,000,000	7,000,000
1986	(Japan) Kayoko Ikoma	ABC Golf Club	Katō, Hyōgo	280	−8	40,000,000	7,000,000
1985	(Taiwan) Tu Ai-yu	Karasuyamajo Country Club	Nasukarasuyama, Tochigi	284	−4	30,000,000	5,000,000
1984	(Taiwan) Huang Yueh-chyn	Shinshu Ina Kokusai Golf Club	Ina, Nagano	285	−3	30,000,000	5,000,000
1983	(Japan) Tatsuko Ohsako	Gamo Golf Club	Hino, Shiga	288	E	25,000,000	4,000,000
1982	(Japan) Ayako Okamoto	Takaoka Country Club	Takaoka, Toyama	283	−5	20,000,000	3,000,000
1981	(Japan) Mieko Suzuki	Goi Country Club	Ichihara, Chiba	213	−3	15,000,000	2,500,000
1980	(Japan) Tatsuko Ohsako	Gamo Golf Club	Hino, Shiga	212	−4	15,000,000	2,500,000
1979	(Japan) Ayako Okamoto	PL Country Club	Tondabayashi, Osaka	205	−17	15,000,000	2,500,000
1978	(Japan) Yuko Moriguchi	PL Country Club	Tondabayashi, Osaka	215	−7	12,000,000	1,800,000
1977	(Japan) Hisako Higuchi	PL Country Club	Tondabayashi, Osaka	218	−4	12,000,000	1,800,000
1976	(Japan) Hisako Higuchi	PL Country Club	Tondabayashi, Osaka	222	E	10,000,000	1,500,000
1975	(Japan) Sayoko Yamazaki	PL Country Club	Tondabayashi, Osaka	223	+1	10,000,000	1,500,000
1974	(Japan) Hisako Higuchi	Hisayama Country Club	Hisayama, Fukuoka	220	+4	5,810,000	1,500,000
1973	(Japan) Hisako Higuchi	Teiho Country Club	Toyota, Aichi	218	−4	5,335,000	1,500,000
1972	(Japan) Hisako Higuchi	Teiho Country Club	Toyota, Aichi	225	+3	3,590,000	1,000,000
1971	(Japan) Hisako Higuchi	Teiho Country Club	Toyota, Aichi	228	+6	1,670,000	500,000
1970	(Japan) Hisako Higuchi	Teiho Country Club	Toyota, Aichi	227	+5	947,000	250,000
1969	(Japan) Hisako Higuchi	Teiho Country Club	Toyota, Aichi	225	+3	580,000	200,000
1968	(Japan) Hisako Higuchi	Amagi Country Club	Izu, Shizuoka	222	+4	470,000	150,000

== See also ==
- Japan Golf Association
- Asahi Broadcasting Corporation
