= Tatsuko Ohsako =

Japanese professional golfer (born 1952)

Tatsuko Ohsako 大迫たつ子
Personal information
- Nationality: Japan
- Born: 8 January 1952 (age 74) Takaharu, Miyazaki, Japan
- Height: 1.55 m (5 ft 1 in)

Career
- Sport: Golf
- Status: Professional
- Former tours: LPGA of Japan Tour (1972–1993); LPGA Tour (1978–1984)
- Professional wins: 45

Number of wins by tour
- LPGA Tour: 1
- LPGA of Japan Tour: 45

Best results in LPGA major championships
- Chevron Championship: T29: 1981
- Women's PGA C'ship: DNP
- U.S. Women's Open: DNP
- du Maurier Classic: DNP

Achievements and awards
- LPGA of Japan Tour leading money winner: 1977, 1980, 1987

Tatsuko Ohsako (Japanese: 大迫たつ子, born 8 January 1952) is a Japanese professional golfer. She played on the LPGA of Japan Tour (JLPGA) and the LPGA Tour.

== Career ==
Ohsako won 45 times on the LPGA of Japan Tour between 1975 and 1991. She was the leading money winner on the LPGA of Japan Tour three times: in 1977, 1980, and 1987.

One of Ohsako's JLPGA wins was co-sanctioned with the LPGA Tour, the 1980 Mazda Japan Classic.

Ohsako finished fifth at the LPGA Tour's qualifying school tournament in January 1978 and played sparingly on the LPGA Tour from 1978 to 1984.

== Professional wins (45) ==
=== LPGA Tour wins (1) ===
| No. | Date | Tournament | Winning score | Margin of victory | Runner-up |
|---|---|---|---|---|---|
| 1 | 9 Nov 1980 | Mazda Japan Classic | −9 (72-68-73=213) | 3 strokes | (United States) Pat Bradley |

=== LPGA of Japan Tour wins (45) ===
- 1975 (2) Japan Ladies Professional East vs. West, Matsushima Ladies Open
- 1977 (4) All-Star, Toyotomi Ladies, Mizuno Golf Tournament, Saikai National Park Ladies Open
- 1978 (4) Hokkaido Women's Open, Saikai National Park Ladies Open, Hokuriku Queens Cup, All-Star
- 1979 (3) Hiroshima Women's Open, Hokkaido Women's Open, Junon Women's Open
- 1980 (3) Northeast Queens, **Japan LPGA Championship**, Mazda Japan Classic (co-sanctioned with LPGA Tour)
- 1981 (2) **Japan Women's Open**, Tokai Classic
- 1982 (2) Hiroshima Women's Open, Japan Ladies Professional East vs West
- 1983 (4) Tokushima Tsukinomiya Ladies Classic Open, Fujisankei Ladies Classic, Canon Queens Cup, **Japan LPGA Championship**
- 1984 (4) Tohato Ladies, **Japan Women's Open**, Recruit Torabayu Cup, **JLPGA Lady Borden Cup**
- 1985 (5) Dunlop Ladies Open, Mizuno Open, Recruit Torabayu Cup, Kosaido Asahi Golf Cup, Tsumura Itsuki Classic
- 1986 (3) Kumamoto Cyuoh Ladies, Recruit Torabayu Cup, **JLPGA Lady Borden Cup**
- 1987 (4) Tohato Ladies, Hiroshima UCC Ladies, Toto Motors Ladies, Karuizawa 72 Tokyu Ladies Open
- 1988 (4) Tohato Ladies, UCC Ladies, Toto Motors Ladies, **Japan LPGA Championship**
- 1991 (1) **Japan LPGA Championship**

Tournament in bold denotes major championships on LPGA of Japan Tour.
