= Japan Golf Association =

Governing body of golf in Japan

The Japan Golf Association (日本ゴルフ協会, Nihon Gorufu Kyōkai), also known as the JGA, is Japanese national association of golf courses, clubs and facilities and the governing body of golf for Japan.

== Competitions organized by JGA ==
- Japan Open Golf Championship
- Japan Women's Open Golf Championship
- Japan Senior Open Golf Championship
- Japan Amateur Golf Championship
- Japan Women's Amateur Golf Championship
- Japan Junior Golf Championship

== See also ==
- Japan Golf Tour
- LPGA of Japan Tour
