= Hisako Higuchi =

Japanese professional golfer (born 1945)

Hisako Higuchi 樋口久子
Personal information
- Full name: Hisako Higuchi
- Nickname: Chako
- Nationality: Japan
- Born: 13 October 1945 (age 81) Kawagoe, Saitama, Japan
- Height: 1.63 m (5 ft 4 in)

Career
- Sport: Golf
- Turned professional: 1967
- Former tours: LPGA of Japan Tour; LPGA Tour
- Professional wins: 73

Number of wins by tour
- LPGA Tour: 2
- LPGA of Japan Tour: 69
- WPGA Tour of Australasia: 1
- Other: 1

Best results in LPGA major championships (wins: 1)
- Western Open: DNP
- Titleholders C'ship: DNP
- Chevron Championship: DNP
- Women's PGA C'ship: Won: 1977
- U.S. Women's Open: T13: 1976
- du Maurier Classic: DNP

Achievements and awards
- World Golf Hall of Fame: 2003 (member page)
- LPGA of Japan Tour leading money winner: 1968, 1969, 1970, 1971, 1972, 1973, 1974, 1975, 1976, 1978, 1979

Hisako "Chako" Higuchi (Japanese: 樋口久子, born 13 October 1945 in Kawagoe, Saitama) is a Japanese professional golfer.

Higuchi studied golf from Torakichi Nakamura, a member of Japan's winning team at the 1957 World Cup of Golf. She turned pro in 1967 and went on to win 69 titles on the LPGA of Japan Tour.

Higuchi won the LPGA Championship on 12 June 1977, making her the first Asian-born player to win a major championship for either men or women. (No Asian-born player would win a men's major until Yang Yong-eun won the 2009 PGA Championship.) She was 31 when she won her LPGA Championship. Alongside Ayako Okamoto, she dominated the 1970s and 1980s in Japanese women's golf.

Higuchi also won the Colgate European Open on the LPGA Tour and the Wills Australian Ladies Open on the ALPG Tour.

Higuchi became president of the LPGA of Japan Tour in 1996. In 2003, she became the first Japanese golfer to be inducted into the World Golf Hall of Fame.

== Professional wins (73) ==
=== LPGA of Japan Tour wins (69) ===
- 1968 (2) Japan Women's Open, Japan LPGA Championship
- 1969 (2) Japan Women's Open, Japan LPGA Championship
- 1970 (3) Japan Women's Open, Japan LPGA Championship, JGP Ladies Open
- 1971 (4) Japan Women's Open, Japan LPGA Championship, JGP Ladies Open, Tokai Classic
- 1972 (5) Japan LPGA Championship, JPGA Asahi Kokusai Tournament, JGP Ladies Open, Tokai Classic, Mizuno Golf
- 1973 (7) Japan LPGA Championship, World Ladies, JGP Ladies Open, La Coste Cup Japan vs. U.S., Matsushima Ladies Open, Tokai Classic, Mizuno Golf
- 1974 (8) Japan Women's Open, Japan LPGA Championship, World Ladies, LPGA Japan Classic, Chikuma Kogen Ladies Open, Tokyo Charity Classic, Sunster Ladies Match, Mizuno Golf
- 1975 (1) Tokai Classic
- 1976 (5) Japan Women's Open, Japan LPGA Championship, Sanpo Champions, Miyagi TV Cup Ladies Open Golf Tournament, Tokai Classic
- 1977 (3) Japan Women's Open, Japan LPGA Championship, Tokai Classic
- 1978 (3) Junon Ladies Open, Shinkoh Classic LPGA Tournament, Japan LPGA East vs. West
- 1979 (5) Fuji Heigen Ladies Open, Shinkoh Classic LPGA Tournament, Japan LPGA East vs. West, Hokuriku Queens Golf Cup, Toyotomi Ladies
- 1980 (3) Japan Women's Open, KBS Kyoto Ladies Golf Tournament, Tokai Classic
- 1981 (3) Okinawa Makiminato Auto Ladies Tournament, Tokushima Tsukinomiya Ladies Open Golf Tournament, Pioneer Cup
- 1982 (2) Hokuriku Queens Golf Cup, Kumamoto Cyuoh Ladies
- 1983 (5) Kibun Ladies Classic, Paris Ladies Classic, Japan LPGA East vs. West, LPGA Japan vs. U.S., Daioh Seishi Elleair Ladies Open Golf Tournament
- 1984 (2) Kumamoto Cyuoh Ladies, Kibun Ladies Classic
- 1985 (1) Chukyo TV-Bridgestone Ladies Open
- 1986 (2) Fujitsu Ladies, Tsumura-Itsuki Classic
- 1987 (1) Yamaha Cup Ladies Open
- 1990 (2) an Queens, Kohsaido Asahi Golf Cup

=== LPGA Tour wins (2) ===
Legend
LPGA Tour major championships (1)
Other LPGA Tour (1)

No.	Date	Tournament	Winning score	Margin of victory	Runners-up
1	7 Aug 1976	Colgate European Open	−12 (68-74-68-74=284)	6 strokes	(United States) Sandra Palmer (United States) Kathy Whitworth
2	12 Jun 1977	LPGA Championship	−9 (71-67-72-69=279)	3 strokes	(United States) Pat Bradley (Canada) Sandra Post (United States) Judy Rankin

LPGA Tour playoff record (0–1)

No.	Year	Tournament	Opponents	Result
1	1979	Women's Kemper Open	(United States) Donna Caponi (United States) JoAnne Carner (United States) Nancy Lopez (Australia) Jan Stephenson	Carner won with par on second extra hole Caponi, Lopez, and Stephenson eliminated by par on first hole

=== ALPG Tour wins (1) ===
- 1974 Wills Australian Ladies Open

=== Other wins (1) ===
- 1983 Sports Nippon Team Match

== Major championships ==
=== Wins (1) ===
Year	Championship	Winning score	Margin	Runners-up
1977	LPGA Championship	−9 (71-67-72-69=279)	3 strokes	(United States) Pat Bradley, (Canada) Sandra Post, (United States) Judy Rankin
