= Nayoko Yoshikawa =

Japanese professional golfer (born 1949)

Nayoko Yoshikawa 吉川なよ子
Personal information
- Nationality: Japan
- Born: 18 February 1949 (age 77) Sapporo, Japan
- Height: 1.59 m (5 ft 3 in)

Career
- Sport: Golf
- Status: Professional
- Former tours: LPGA of Japan Tour (1973–2004); LPGA Tour (1978–1980)
- Professional wins: 29

Number of wins by tour
- LPGA Tour: 1
- LPGA of Japan Tour: 29

Best results in LPGA major championships
- Chevron Championship: DNP
- Women's PGA C'ship: DNP
- U.S. Women's Open: CUT: 1989
- du Maurier Classic: DNP

Achievements and awards
- LPGA of Japan Tour leading money winner: 1988

Nayoko Yoshikawa (Japanese: 吉川なよ子, born 18 February 1949) is a Japanese professional golfer who played on the LPGA of Japan Tour (JLPGA) and the LPGA Tour.

== Career ==
Yoshikawa won 29 times on the JLPGA between 1979 and 1995. She was the leading money winner on JLPGA in 1988.

One of Yoshikawa's JLPGA wins was co-sanctioned with the LPGA Tour, the 1984 Mazda Japan Classic.

Yoshikawa finished third at the LPGA Tour's qualifying school tournament in January 1978 and played sparingly on the LPGA Tour from 1978 to 1980. Her 1984 win was as a non-member.

== Awards and honors ==
In 1988, Yoshikawa was the leading money winner on the LPGA of Japan Tour

== Professional wins (29) ==
=== LPGA of Japan Tour wins (29) ===
- 1979 (3) Japan LPGA East vs. West, **Japan Women's Open**, Mita Lakeside Women's Professional
- 1980 (3) Stanley Ladies, **JLPGA Lady Borden Cup**, Sanyo Queens
- 1982 (4) Okinawa Makiminato Auto Ladies, Mizuno Open, Pioneer Cup, Kosaido Asahi Golf Cup
- 1983 (4) Junon Ladies Open, Stanley Ladies, Isuzu Ladies Cup, Fujitsu Ladies
- 1984 (3) Fujitsu Ladies, Mazda Japan Classic (co-sanctioned with LPGA Tour), Saikai National Park Ladies Open
- 1985 (1) Uniden Japan Ladies
- 1986 (1) Dunlop Ladies Open
- 1987 (3) Kumamoto Cyuoh Ladies, **Japan Women's Open**, Stanley Ladies
- 1988 (5) Kibun Ladies Classic, Yamaha Cup Ladies Open, Mizuno Open, Stanley Ladies, Itsuki & Orimupikku Ladies
- 1990 (1) Itoki Classic
- 1995 (1) Saishunkan Ladies Hinokuni Open

Tournament in bold denotes major championships on LPGA of Japan Tour.

=== LPGA Tour wins (1) ===
No.	Date	Tournament	Winning score	Margin of victory	Runners-up
1	4 Nov 1984	Mazda Japan Classic^{1}	−6 (74-70-66=210)	2 strokes	(Japan) Ayako Okamoto (United States) Lauri Peterson

^{1} Co-sanction with the LPGA of Japan Tour

== Team appearances ==
Professional

- Handa Cup (representing World team): 2006, 2007
