= Meiji Cup =

Golf tournament in Japan

The Meiji Cup is an annual event on the LPGA of Japan Tour since 1978. The tournament is held in Hokkaido. In 2006, the event moved to the Sapporo International Country Club Shimamatsu Course. The 2025 prize fund is ¥90,000,000 with ¥16,200,000 going to the winner.

== Winners ==
Meiji Cup

- 2026 Yuzuki Yoshizawa
- 2025 Yui Kawamoto
- 2024 Rio Takeda
- 2023 Ai Suzuki
- 2022 Lee Min-young
- 2021 Cancelled due to 2020 Tokyo Olympics
- 2020 Cancelled due to 2020 Tokyo Olympics
- 2019 Bae Seon-woo
- 2018 Mami Fukuda
- 2017 Haruka Morita-WanyaoLu
- 2016 Lee Bo-mee
- 2015 Yukari Nishiyama
- 2014 Jiyai Shin
- 2013 Na Da-ye
- 2012 Shanshan Feng
- 2011 Shanshan Feng

Meiji Chocolate Cup

- 2010 Yuri Fudoh
- 2009 Jeon Mi-jeong
- 2008 Yuri Fudoh
- 2007 Shiho Oyama
- 2006 Jeon Mi-jeong

Chateraise Queen's Cup

- 2005 Junko Omote
- 2004 Akiko Fukushima

Toyo Suishan Ladies Hokkaido

- 2003 Kaori Suzuki
- 2002 Chihiro Nakajima
- 2001 Chieko Amanuma
- 2000 Junko Yasui
- 1999 Toshimi Kimura
- 1998 Michie Ohba
- 1997 Kaori Higo
- 1996 Ku Ok-hee
- 1995 Aki Nakano
- 1994 Hiromi Takamura
- 1993 Nayumi Murai
- 1992 Atsuko Hikage
- 1991 Aiko Takasu
- 1990 Norimi Terasawa
- 1989 Tu Ai-yu
- 1988 Aiko Takasu

Hokkaido Women's Open

- 1987 Tu Ai-yu
- 1986 Tu Ai-yu
- 1985 Kayoko Ikoma
- 1984 Reiko Kashiwado
- 1983 Wu Ming
- 1982 Tu Ai-yu
- 1981 Keiko Matsuda
- 1980 Takako Kiyomoto
- 1979 Tatsuko Ohsako
- 1978 Tatsuko Ohsako
