= KKT Cup Vantelin Ladies Open =

Annual tournament on the LPGA of Japan Tour

Tournament information
- Location: Kikuyō, Kumamoto
- Established: 1992
- Course: Kumamoto Airport Country Club
- Par: 72
- Length: 6,523 yards (5,965 m)
- Tour: LPGA of Japan Tour
- Format: Stroke play
- Prize fund: ¥100 million
- Month played: April

Current champion
- (Japan) Sayaka Takahashi

The KKT Cup Vantelin Ladies Open is an annual tournament on the LPGA of Japan Tour. It was first held in 1992 at the Tamana Country Club in Kumamoto Prefecture.

== Winners ==
KKT Cup Vantelin Ladies Open

- 2026 Sayaka Takahashi
- 2025 Shuri Sakuma
- 2024 Rio Takeda
- 2023 Akie Iwai
- 2022 Nozomi Uetake
- 2021 Miyū Yamashita
- 2020 Cancelled
- 2019 Lee Ji-hee
- 2018 Mamiko Higa
- 2017 Yukari Nishiyama
- 2016 Cancelled due to earthquake
- 2015 Erika Kikuchi
- 2014 Minami Katsu (amateur)
- 2013 Miki Saiki

Nishijin Ladies Classic

- 2012 Maiko Wakabayashi
- 2011 Yuri Fudoh
- 2010 Inbee Park

Life Card Ladies

- 2009 Lee Ji-hee
- 2008 Yukari Baba
- 2007 Momoko Ueda
- 2006 Yuri Fudoh
- 2005 Sakura Yokomine

Saishunkan Ladies Hinokuni Open

- 2004 Yuri Fudoh
- 2003 Lee Ji-hee
- 2002 Tu Ai-yu
- 2001 Kaori Higo
- 2000 Midori Yoneyama
- 1999 Nahoko Hirao
- 1998 Michiko Hattori
- 1997 Chikayo Yamazaki
- 1996 Lee Young-me
- 1995 Nayoko Yoshikawa
- 1994 Ikuyo Shiotani
- 1993 Fuki Kido
- 1992 Ikuyo Shiotani
