= Fujisankei Ladies Classic =

Golf tournament

Tournament information
- Location: Itō, Shizuoka
- Established: 1982
- Course(s): Kawana Hotel, Fuji Course
- Par: 72
- Length: 6,367 yards (5,822 m)
- Tour: LPGA of Japan Tour
- Format: Stroke play
- Prize fund: ¥80 million
- Month played: April

Current champion
- (Japan) Rio Takeda (2024)

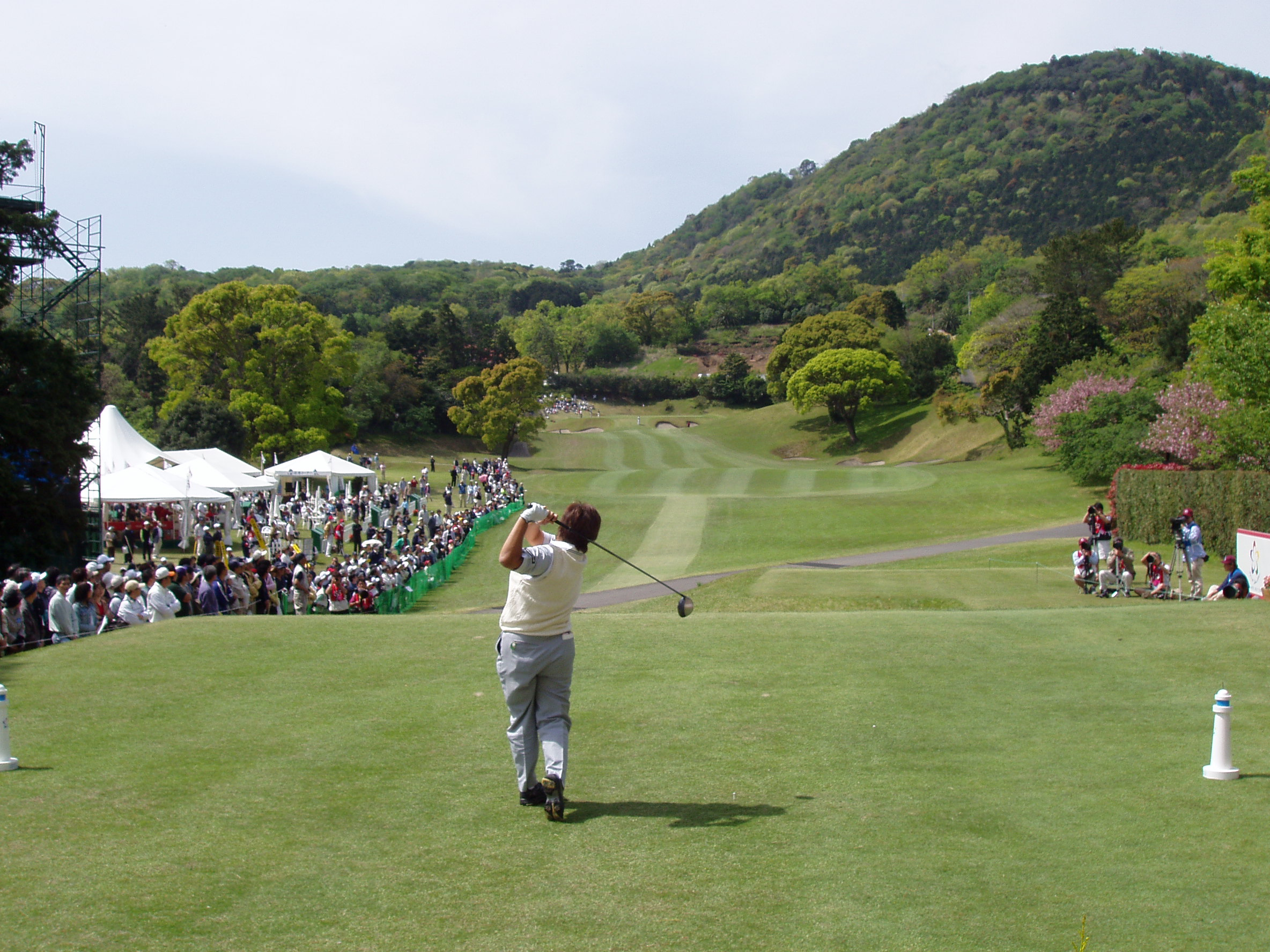
The 24th Fujisankei Ladies Classic, 1st hole, Ayako Okamoto's tee shot (photographed on April 23, 2005)

The Fujisankei Ladies Classic (Japanese: フジサンケイレディスクラシック) is an annual golf tournament on the LPGA of Japan Tour. First held in 1982, the tournament was established as an alternative to the mens league's Fujisankei Classic. The tournament was initially held at the Five Hundred Club in Shizuoka from 1982 to 1995, before transitioning to the Fujizakura Country Club, where it was held from 1996 to 2003. In 2004, the event was held at the Fuji Lakeside Country Club, and in 2005 the event was again moved, this time to the Kawana Hotel's Fuji golf course, where it has been held every year since with two exceptions.

== Cancellation ==
In 2020, the event was cancelled due to the COVID-19 pandemic and resumed the following year. Five years later, in 2025, the event was cancelled by the tournament sponsor, the Fujisankei Communications Group, resulting from the sexual assault allegations controversy surrounding former television personality and idol Masahiro Nakai.

2025 would have marked the 43rd iteration of the Fujisankei Ladies Classic tournament. The 42nd tournament in 2024 brought upwards of six thousand visitors to the Izu peninsula. The abrupt cancellation of the event has had a negative affect on the local economy, with the general producer of the event, Masaru Tobari reporting one thousand cancellations of accommodations at local hotels.

== Prize money ==
The prize fund in 2023 was ¥80,000,000, with ¥14,400,000 going to the winner.

== Winners ==
Iteration	Year	Date	Winner	To par	Course
−	2025	Cancelled			
42	2024	21 Apr	(Japan) Rio Takeda	−12	Kawana Hotel Golf Course
41	2023	23 Apr	(Japan) Sora Kamiya	−4	Kawana Hotel Golf Course
40	2022	24 Apr	(Japan) Sayaka Takahashi	−12	Kawana Hotel Golf Course
39	2021	25 Apr	(Japan) Mone Inami	−12	Kawana Hotel Golf Course
−	2020	Cancelled			
38	2019	28 Apr	(South Korea) Jiyai Shin	−8	Kawana Hotel Golf Course
37	2018	22 Apr	(Japan) Saki Nagamine	−10	Kawana Hotel Golf Course
36	2017	23 Apr	(Japan) Yumiko Yoshida	−12	Kawana Hotel Golf Course
35	2016	24 Apr	(Japan) Shiho Oyama	−11	Kawana Hotel Golf Course
34	2015	26 Apr	(Japan) Hikari Fujita	−7	Kawana Hotel Golf Course
33	2014	27 Apr	(Taiwan) Phoebe Yao	−9	Kawana Hotel Golf Course
32	2013	28 Apr	(Japan) Miki Saiki	−14	Kawana Hotel Golf Course
31	2012	22 Apr	(Japan) Kaori Ohe	−9	Kawana Hotel Golf Course
30	2011	24 Apr	(Japan) Kumiko Kaneda	−5	Kawana Hotel Golf Course
29	2010	25 Apr	(Japan) Mayu Hattori	−7	Kawana Hotel Golf Course
28	2009	26 Apr	(Australia) Tamie Durdin	−7	Kawana Hotel Golf Course
27	2008	27 Apr	(Japan) Ayako Uehara	−8	Kawana Hotel Golf Course
26	2007	22 Apr	(Japan) Miki Saiki	−6	Kawana Hotel Golf Course
25	2006	23 Apr	(Japan) Shiho Oyama	−1	Kawana Hotel Golf Course
24	2005	24 Apr	(Japan) Kasumi Fujii	−3	Kawana Hotel Golf Course
23	2004	5 Sep	(Japan) Kasumi Fujii	−5	Fuji Lakeside Country Club
22	2003	7 Sep	(Japan) Ikuyo Shiotani	−11	Fujizakura Country Club
21	2002	8 Sep	(South Korea) Ku Ok-hee	−7	Fujizakura Country Club
20	2001	2 Sep	(Japan) Miyuki Shimabukuro	+1	Fujizakura Country Club
19	2000	3 Sep	(Japan) Mayumi Hirase	−8	Fujizakura Country Club
18	1999	5 Sep	(Japan) Midori Yoneyama	−6	Fujizakura Country Club
17	1998	6 Sep	(Japan) Masako Ishihara	0	Fujizakura Country Club
16	1997	7 Sep	(Japan) Aki Takamura	−2	Fujizakura Country Club
15	1996	1 Sep	(Japan) Ayako Okamoto	−6	Fujizakura Country Club
14	1995	3 Sep	(Japan) Junko Yasui	−4	Five Hundred Club
13	1994	4 Sep	(Taiwan) Yueh-chyn Huang	−6	Five Hundred Club
12	1993	5 Sep	(United States) Sheree Smail	−2	Five Hundred Club
11	1992	6 Sep	(Japan) Ayako Okamoto	−9	Five Hundred Club
10	1991	8 Sep	(Japan) Norimi Teresawa	−6	Five Hundred Club
9	1990	2 Sep	(Japan) Mayumi Hirase	−8	Five Hundred Club
8	1989	3 Sep	(Japan) Erika Nakajima	−2	Five Hundred Club
7	1988	4 Sep	(Japan) Junko Yasui	−9	Five Hundred Club
6	1987	6 Sep	(United States) Cindy Rarick	−3	Five Hundred Club
5	1986	17 Aug	(Japan) Atsuko Hikage	−7	Five Hundred Club
4	1985	18 Aug	(Taiwan) Tu Ai-yu	−9	Five Hundred Club
3	1984	19 Aug	(Japan) Hiromi Takamura	−8	Five Hundred Club
2	1983	21 Aug	(Japan) Tatsuko Ohsako	−8	Five Hundred Club
1	1982	15 Aug	(Japan) Yoko Kobayashi	−8	Five Hundred Club
