= Yuko Moriguchi =

Japanese professional golfer (born 1955)

Yuko Moriguchi 森口祐子
Personal information
- Nationality: Japan
- Born: 13 April 1955 (age 71) Toyama, Toyama, Japan
- Height: 1.60 m (5 ft 3 in)

Career
- Sport: Golf
- Status: Professional
- Former tours: LPGA of Japan Tour (1974–2007); LPGA Tour (1981–1983)
- Professional wins: 41

Number of wins by tour
- LPGA Tour: 1
- LPGA of Japan Tour: 41

Best results in LPGA major championships
- Chevron Championship: DNP
- Women's PGA C'ship: DNP
- U.S. Women's Open: T25: 1982
- du Maurier Classic: DNP
- Women's British Open: DNP

Yuko Moriguchi (Japanese: 森口祐子, born 13 April 1955) is a Japanese professional golfer who played on the LPGA of Japan Tour and the LPGA Tour.

Moriguchi won 41 times on the LPGA of Japan Tour between 1978 and 1994 and one of those events, the 1987 Mazda Japan Classic, was an LPGA Tour co-sanctioned tournament.

Moriguchi won the LPGA qualifying school tournament in January 1981 and played sparingly on the LPGA Tour from 1981 to 1983. Her 1987 win was as a non-member.

== Professional wins ==
=== LPGA of Japan Tour (41) ===
- 1978 (4) World Ladies Golf Tournament, **Japan LPGA Championship**, Miyagi TV Cup Ladies Open, Mizuno Golf Tournament
- 1979 (2) Saikai National Park Ladies Open, Pioneer Cup
- 1980 (3) Hiroshima Women's Open, Mizuno Golf Tournament, Isuzu Ladies Cup
- 1981 (6) Yakult Mirumiru Ladies, Northeast Queens, Kumamoto Cyuoh Ladies, Junon Women's Open, Mizuno Golf Tournament, **JLPGA Lady Borden Cup**
- 1982 (4) Tokushima Tsukinomiya Ladies Open, Junon Women's Open, Northeast Queens, Elleair Ladies Open
- 1983 (4) Tohato Ladies, Yakult Mirumiru Ladies, Mitsubishi Fanta Database Ladies, Northeast Queens
- 1985 (5) Mizuno Open, **Japan Women's Open**, Isuzu Ladies Cup, Miyagi TV Cup Women's Open, **JLPGA Lady Borden Cup**
- 1987 (2) Mazda Japan Classic (co-sanctioned with LPGA Tour), **JLPGA Lady Borden Cup**
- 1989 (2) Yamaha Cup Ladies Open, an Queens
- 1990 (2) **Japan Women's Open**, Miyagi TV Cup Women's Open
- 1991 (3) Sky Court Ladies, Yakult Ladies, Takara Invitational
- 1992 (1) Konica Cup World Ladies
- 1993 (1) Stanley Ladies
- 1994 (2) Mitsukoshi Cup Ladies Open, Consulting Inc. Ladies

Tournament in bold denotes major championships in LPGA of Japan Tour.

=== LPGA Tour (1) ===
No.	Date	Tournament	Winning score	Margin of victory	Runner-up
1	8 Nov 1987	Mazda Japan Classic	−10 (68-66-72=206)	3 strokes	(Japan) Ayako Okamoto
