= Michiko Hattori =

Japanese professional golfer

Michiko Hattori 服部道子
Personal information
- Full name: Michiko Hattori
- Nationality: Japan
- Born: 8 September 1968 (age 58) Nisshin, Aichi, Japan
- Height: 5 ft 7 in (1.70 m)

Career
- Sport: Golf
- College: University of Texas
- Turned professional: 1992
- Former tour: LPGA of Japan Tour
- Professional wins: 18

Number of wins by tour
- LPGA of Japan Tour: 18

Best results in LPGA major championships
- Chevron Championship: T58: 1999
- Women's PGA C'ship: CUT: 2005
- U.S. Women's Open: T21: 1987
- du Maurier Classic: DNP
- Women's British Open: T24: 2003

Achievements and awards
- LPGA of Japan Tour Player of the Year: 1998
- LPGA of Japan Tour leading money winner: 1998
- LPGA of Japan Tour Rookie of the Year: 1992
- Honda Broderick Award: 1990

Michiko Hattori (Japanese: 服部道子, born 8 September 1968) is a Japanese professional golfer and former Player of the Year on the LPGA of Japan Tour. Before turning professional, she became the first Japanese born champion of the U.S. Women's Amateur.

== Amateur career ==
Hattori was among the most decorated amateur and collegiate golfers in history. At age 16 in 1985 she became the third youngest, and only Japanese born, champion of the U.S. Women's Amateur, and in 1986 became the first golfer to win medalist honors at the U.S. Women's Amateur and U.S. Girls' Junior in the same year. Hattori is a three-time U.S. Women's Amateur stroke play medalist (1985–1987), and the youngest ever winner of the Japan Women's Amateur Championship (age 14). She won three Japan Women's Amateur titles and the 1988 Canadian Women's Amateur. She is one of 12 foreign winners of the U.S. Women's Amateur in its 115-year history, and one of 11 golfers to have won the title on their first attempt. She is one of six to have won U.S. Amateur medalist honors three or more times, and the only golfer to have done so for the past 70 years.

Hattori lead Japan to four consecutive top-5 finishes at the IGF World Amateur Team Championships Espirito Santo Trophy, the country's best ever performances in the bi-annual competition. In 1987, she won the individual title and led Japan to a team victory in the Queen Sirikit Cup, a prestigious annual competition between Asian nations; other former individual winners of the cup include Hiromi Kobayashi and LPGA members to be Yani Tseng, Mi Hyun Kim, Hee-Won Han and Jeong Jang.

Hattori had a storied collegiate career at the University of Texas, where she won 10 individual titles and was twice named Collegiate Golfer of the Year. She was the 1990 recipient of the Honda-Broderick Award for Golf. Among her achievements was finishing in the top ten in 38 of 40 events in which she competed during her four years at Texas, including three individual top-ten finishes at the NCAA Women's Golf Championship (tied for 1st at the end of regulation in 1989; lost in playoff).

== Professional career ==
In her first season as a professional, Hattori recorded 11 top-10 finishes and placed 8th on the money list on her way to being named the 1992 Japan LPGA Rookie of the Year. She won three times with 15 top-10s in her second season on tour (1993), and in 1998 won five titles, including the Japan LPGA Championship, and placed second three times. She was named the JLPGA Player of the Year and won the season-ending money title. Her most recent win was the Studio Alice Women's Open in 2005. Hattori has won 18 Japan LPGA titles and finished in the top three on tour 56 times; she boasts career totals of 150 top-10 and 300 top-25 finishes through the end of the 2008 season. She has finished in the top-10 on the JLPGA money list seven times, and placed in the top-25 for fifteen consecutive seasons (1992–2006).

Among Hattori's professional wins are two Japan Women's Open Golf Championships, the Japan LPGA Championship, and two Fujitsu Ladies Open titles. She is also winner of the 1998 IDC Otsuka Ladies Championship, succeeding 1997 winner Annika Sörenstam.

== Amateur wins ==
- 1984 Japan Women's Amateur
- 1985 Japan Women's Amateur, U.S. Women's Amateur
- 1987 Queen Sirikit Cup (individual and team)
- 1988 Japan Women's Amateur, Canadian Women's Amateur

== Professional wins (18) ==
=== LPGA of Japan Tour wins (18) ===
- 1993 (3) Mizuno Ladies Open, Yukijirushi Ladies Tokai Classic, Itoki Classic
- 1994 (2) **Japan Women's Open Golf Championship**, Yukijirushi Ladies Tokai Classic
- 1997 (2) Goyo Kenetsu Ladies Cup, Miyagi TV Cup
- 1998 (5) Saishunkan Ladies Hinokuni Open, Nasu Ogawa Ladies, **Japan LPGA Championship Konica Cup**, Hisako Higuchi Kibun Classic, Itoen Ladies Open
- 1999 (1) Fujitsu Ladies
- 2001 (1) Suntory Ladies Open
- 2003 (2) Kosaido Ladies Golf Cup, **Japan Women's Open Golf Championship**
- 2004 (1) Fujitsu Ladies
- 2005 (1) Studio Alice Women's Open

Tournament in bold denotes major championships in LPGA of Japan Tour.

== Awards ==
1987–1991	4-Time 1st Team All-American
1987–1991	4-Time Southwest Conference Player of the Year
1989	Golfweek Collegiate Golfer of the Year
1989	NGCA Collegiate Golfer of the Year
1990	Honda-Broderick Award – Nation's Top Collegiate Golfer

== Japan LPGA history ==
Year	Wins	2nd	3rd	Top 10	Top 25
1991				2	5
1992		3	1	11	21
1993	3	1	1	15	24
1994	2	2	1	12	21
1995		1	1	11	19
1996		2	2	11	21
1997	2		1	3	15
1998	5	3		11	19
1999	1	2	3	10	20
2000		1		6	16
2001	1	1	1	7	14
2002		1	1	4	11
2003	2	1		8	18
2004	1	2		10	20
2005	1	2	1	10	17
2006		2		10	22
2007		1		5	11
2008				4	6
2009					2
2011					
2012					
Total	18	25	13	150	302

== Team appearances ==
Amateur

- Espirito Santo Trophy (representing Japan): 1984, 1986, 1988, 1990
