= Toto Japan Classic =

Coordinates: 34.956°N 135.922°E

Tournament information
- Location: Omitama, Ibaraki, Japan (2023)
- Established: 1973; 53 years ago
- Course: Taiheiyo Club Minori Course (2023)
- Par: 72
- Length: 6,608 yards (6,042 m)
- Organized by: MBS; Sports Nippon
- Tours: LPGA Tour; LPGA of Japan Tour
- Format: Stroke play – 72 holes
- Prize fund: $2.0 million
- Month played: November

Tournament record score
- Aggregate: 192 Annika Sörenstam (2003, 3 rnds); 266 Mone Inami (2023)
- To par: −24 Annika Sörenstam (2003, 3 rnds) −22 Mone Inami (2023)

Current champion
- (Japan) Shuri Sakuma

Location in Japan

The Toto Japan Classic is an annual women's professional golf tournament in Japan, jointly sanctioned by the two richest women's professional tours: the U.S.-based LPGA Tour and the LPGA of Japan Tour. It was an unofficial money event on the LPGA Tour from 1973 to 1975. It has taken place every year since 1973 at various locations, and is typically held in early November. From 2006 through 2015, the event has been played at Kintetsu Kashikojima Country Club in Shima, Mie. In 2016 and 2017, the events have been held at Minori Course of Taiheiyo Club in Omitama, Ibaraki, then changed back to the North Course of Seta Golf Course in Ōtsu, Shiga prefecture for 2018 events.

The tournament has had various names and sponsors throughout its history. Its current title sponsor is Toto Ltd. a Japanese bathroom products supplier.

Annika Sörenstam won the tournament five consecutive times from 2001 to 2005.

In 2007, Momoko Ueda of Japan scored a final round double eagle to win by two strokes over runners-up Maria Hjorth and Reilley Rankin.

== Tournament names ==
- 1973–1974: LPGA Japan Classic
- 1975: Japan Classic
- 1976: LPGA/Japan Mizuno Classic
- 1977–1979: Mizuno Japan Classic
- 1980–1992: Mazda Japan Classic
- 1993–1997: Toray Japan Queens Cup
- 1998: Japan Classic
- 1999–2014: Mizuno Classic
- 2015–present: Toto Japan Classic

== Winners ==
Year	Date	Champion	Country	Score	Venue	Purse ($)	Winner's share($)
2026	Nov 8	Shuri Sakuma	Japan	268 (−20)	Taiheiyo Club Minori Course	2,100,000	315,000
2025	Nov 9	Nasa Hataoka	Japan	201^{4} (−15)^{PO}	Seta Golf Course, North Course	2,100,000	315,000
2024	Nov 3	Rio Takeda	Japan	201^{3} (−15)^{PO}	Seta Golf Course, North Course	2,000,000	300,000
2023	Nov 5	Mone Inami	Japan	266 (–22)	Taiheiyo Club Minori Course	2,000,000	300,000
2022	Nov 6	Gemma Dryburgh	Scotland	268 (−20)	Seta Golf Course, North Course	2,000,000	300,000
2021^{2}	Nov 7	Ayaka Furue	Japan	272 (−16)	Seta Golf Course, North Course	¥220,000,000	¥33,000,000
2020^{2}	Nov 8	Jiyai Shin (2)	South Korea	197 (−19)	Taiheiyo Club, Minori Course	¥160,000,000	¥24,000,000
2019	Nov 10	Ai Suzuki	Japan	199 (−17)	Seta Golf Course, North Course	1,500,000	225,000
2018	Nov 4	Nasa Hataoka	Japan	202 (−14)	Seta Golf Course, North Course	1,500,000	225,000
2017	Nov 5	Shanshan Feng (2)	China	197 (−19)	Taiheiyo Club, Minori Course	1,500,000	225,000
2016	Nov 6	Shanshan Feng	China	203 (−13)	Taiheiyo Club, Minori Course	1,500,000	225,000
2015	Nov 8	Ahn Sun-ju	South Korea	200 (−16)^{PO}	Kashikojima Country Club in Shima	1,500,000	225,000
2014	Nov 9	Lee Mi-hyang	South Korea	205 (−11)^{PO}	Kashikojima Country Club in Shima	1,200,000	180,000
2013	Nov 10	Teresa Lu	Taiwan	202 (−14)	Kashikojima Country Club in Shima	1,200,000	180,000
2012	Nov 4	Stacy Lewis	United States	205 (−11)	Kashikojima Country Club in Shima	1,200,000	180,000
2011	Nov 6	Momoko Ueda (2)	Japan	200 (−16)^{PO}	Kashikojima Country Club in Shima	1,200,000	180,000
2010	Nov 7	Jiyai Shin (2)	South Korea	198 (−18)	Kashikojima Country Club in Shima	1,200,000	180,000
2009	Nov 8	Song Bo-bae	South Korea	201 (−15)	Kashikojima Country Club in Shima	1,400,000	210,000
2008	Nov 9	Jiyai Shin	South Korea	201 (−15)	Kashikojima Country Club in Shima	1,400,000	210,000
2007	Nov 4	Momoko Ueda	Japan	203 (−13)	Kashikojima Country Club in Shima	1,400,000	210,000
2006	Nov 5	Karrie Webb	Australia	202 (−14)	Kashikojima Country Club in Shima	1,200,000	180,000
2005	Nov 6	Annika Sörenstam (5)	Sweden	195 (−21)	Seta Golf Course	1,000,000	150,000
2004	Nov 7	Annika Sörenstam (4)	Sweden	194 (−22)	Seta Golf Course	1,000,000	150,000
2003	Oct 9	Annika Sörenstam (3)	Sweden	192 (−24)	Seta Golf Course	1,130,000	169,500
2002	Nov 10	Annika Sörenstam (2)	Sweden	201 (−15)	Seta Golf Course	1,130,000	169,500
2001	Nov 4	Annika Sörenstam	Sweden	203 (−13)	Musashigaoka Golf Course	1,080,000	162,000
2000	Nov 5	Lorie Kane	Canada	204 (−12)^{PO}	Seta Golf Course	850,000	127,500
1999	Nov 7	Maria Hjorth	Sweden	201 (−15)	Seta Golf Course	800,000	120,000
1998	Nov 8	Hiromi Kobayashi	Japan	205 (−11)^{PO}	Musashigaoka Golf Course	800,000	120,000
1997	Nov 9	Liselotte Neumann (2)	Sweden	205 (−11)	Seta Golf Course	750,000	112,500
1996	Nov 3	Mayumi Hirase	Japan	212 (−4)^{PO}	Tone Golf Club	750,000	112,500
1995	Nov 5	Ko Woo-soon (2)	South Korea	207 (−9)	Seta Golf Course	700,000	105,000
1994	Nov 6	Ko Woo-soon	South Korea	206 (−7)	Oak Hills Country Club	700,000	105,000
1993	Nov 7	Betsy King (2)	United States	205 (−11)	Lions Country Club	650,000	97,500
1992	Nov 8	Betsy King	United States	205 (−11)	Musashigaoka Golf Course	650,000	97,500
1991	Nov 10	Liselotte Neumann	Sweden	211 (−5)	Seta Golf Course	550,000	82,500
1990	Nov 4	Debbie Massey (2)	United States	133^{1} (−11)	Musashigaoka Golf Course	550,000	82,500
1989	Nov 5	Elaine Crosby	United States	205 (−11)	Seta Golf Course	500,000	75,000
1988	Nov 6	Patty Sheehan (2)	United States	206 (−10)^{PO}	Musashigaoka Golf Course	450,000	67,500
1987	Nov 8	Yuko Moriguchi	Japan	206 (−10)	Musashigaoka Golf Course	350,000	52,500
1986	Nov 9	Tu Ai-yu	Taiwan	213 (−3)^{PO}	Lions Country Club	300,000	45,000
1985	Nov 10	Jane Blalock	United States	206 (−10)	Musashigaoka Golf Course	300,000	45,000
1984	Nov 4	Nayoko Yoshikawa	Japan	210 (−6)^{PO}	Hiroshima Country Club	300,000	41,250
1983	Nov 13	Pat Bradley	United States	206 (−10)	Musashigaoka Golf Course	250,000	37,500
1982	Nov 6	Nancy Lopez	United States	207 (−9)	Melshin-Yokaichi Country Club	250,000	30,000
1981	Nov 8	Patty Sheehan	United States	213 (−9)	Sagamihara Golf Club	250,000	30,000
1980	Nov 9	Tatsuko Ohsako	Japan	213 (−9)^{PO}	Hanayashiki Golf Club	225,000	26,250
1979	Nov 3	Amy Alcott	United States	211 (−11)	Hanayashiki Golf Club	125,000	18,750
1978	Nov 3	Michiko Okada	Japan	216 (−6)^{PO}	Hanayashiki Golf Club	125,000	18,750
1977	Nov 3	Debbie Massey	United States	220 (−2)	Hanayashiki Golf Club	100,000	15,000
1976	Nov 3	Donna Caponi	United States	217 (−5)	Hanayashiki Golf Club	100,000	15,000
1975	Oct 19	Shelley Hamlin	United States	218 (−1)	Ibaraki Kokusai Golf Club	100,000	15,000
1974	Nov 3	Chako Higuchi	Japan	218 (−4)	Horyuju Country Club	100,000	15,000
1973	Dec1	Jan Ferraris	United States	216 (E)	Shin Sode-Gahara Country Club	50,000	7,500

^{PO} Won sudden-death playoff
^{1} The 1990 tournament was shortened to 36 holes due to rain.
^{2} The 2020 and 2021 tournaments were solely sanctioned by the LPGA of Japan Tour, and not on the United States-based LPGA Tour because of pandemic-related travel restrictions.
^{3} The 2024 tournament was shortened to 54 holes due to impact of Typhoon Kong-rey in Japan cancelling the third round. ^{4} The 2025 tournament was shortened to 36 holes due to rain.
