= Mayumi Hirase =

Japanese professional golfer (born 1969)

Mayumi Hirase 平瀬真由美
Personal information
- Nationality: Japan
- Born: 30 October 1969 (age 57) Kumamoto, Kumamoto Prefecture, Japan
- Height: 1.73 m (5 ft 8 in)

Career
- Sport: Golf
- Status: Professional
- Former tours: LPGA of Japan Tour (1988–2006); LPGA Tour (1996–2000)
- Professional wins: 19

Number of wins by tour
- LPGA Tour: 1
- LPGA of Japan Tour: 19

Best results in LPGA major championships
- Chevron Championship: T13: 1999
- Women's PGA C'ship: T11: 1999
- U.S. Women's Open: T19: 1996
- du Maurier Classic: T34: 1998
- Women's British Open: DNP

Achievements and awards
- LPGA of Japan Tour Player of the Year: 1993, 1994
- LPGA of Japan Tour leading money winner: 1993, 1994
- LPGA of Japan Tour Rookie of the Year: 1989

Mayumi Hirase (Japanese: 平瀬真由美, born 30 October 1969) is a Japanese professional golfer who played on the LPGA of Japan Tour and the LPGA Tour.

Hirase won 18 times on the LPGA of Japan Tour between 1989 and 2000.

Hirase won once on the LPGA Tour in 1996.

== Professional wins (19) ==
=== LPGA of Japan Tour (19) ===
- 1989 (3) Miyagi TV Cup Ladies Open, Ben Hogan & Itsuki Classic, **JLPGA Lady Borden Cup**
- 1990 (1) Fujisankei Ladies Classic
- 1991 (1) Marukoh Ladies
- 1992 (1) Mitsubishi Electric Ladies
- 1993 (3) World Ladies, Kose-Junon Women's Open, Fujitsu Ladies
- 1994 (4) NEC Karuizawa 72, Takara World Invitational, Daio Paper Elleair Women's Open, **JLPGA Meiji Dairies Cup**
- 1995 (3) Toto Motors Ladies, Dunlop Twin Lakes Ladies Open, NEC Karuizawa 72
- 1996 (1) Toray Japan Queens Cup (co-sanctioned with LPGA Tour)
- 1999 (1) Daio Paper Elleair Ladies Open
- 2000 (1) Fujisankei Ladies Classic

Tournament in bold denotes major championships in LPGA of Japan Tour.

=== LPGA Tour (1) ===
No.	Date	Tournament	Winning score	Margin of victory	Runner-up
1	2 Nov 1996	Toray Japan Queens Cup	–4 (70-70-72=212)	Playoff	(England) Laura Davies

LPGA Tour playoff record (1–0)

No.	Year	Tournament	Opponent	Result
1	1996	Toray Japan Queens Cup	(England) Laura Davies	Won with par on third extra hole
