= Japan Women's Open Golf Championship =

Japan Women's Open
Tournament information
- Location: Varies – Miki, Hyōgo in 2025
- Established: 1968
- Course: Varies – Cherry Hills Golf Club in 2025
- Organized by: Japan Golf Association
- Tour: LPGA of Japan Tour
- Format: Stroke play
- Prize fund: ¥150,000,000
- Month played: October

Tournament record score
- Aggregate: 268 Nasa Hataoka (2017)
- To par: −20 Nasa Hataoka (2017)

Current champion
- (South Korea) Jiyai Shin

The Japan Women's Open Golf Championship (日本女子オープンゴルフ選手権競技, Nihon Joshi ōpun gorufu senshuken kyōgi) is Japan's national women's open golf championship. From 2006 (as of 2011) it is one of the two richest tournaments on the LPGA of Japan Tour, with a prize fund of 140 million Yen.

Tournament names through the years:

- 1968–1970: TBS Women's Open
- 1971–present: Japan Women's Open Golf Championship

== Winners ==
Year	Champion	Venue	Location	Score	To par	Purse (¥)	Winner's share (¥)
2026	(South Korea) Jiyai Shin	Takarazuka Golf Club	Takarazuka, Hyōgo	269	−11	150,000,000	30,000,000
2025	(Japan) Kotone Hori	Cherry Hills Golf Club	Miki, Hyōgo	269	−19	150,000,000	30,000,000
2024	(Japan) Rio Takeda	Ohtone Country Club	Bandō, Ibaraki	278	−10	150,000,000	30,000,000
2023	(Japan) Erika Hara	Awara Golf Club, Sea Course	Awara, Fukui	273	−15	150,000,000	30,000,000
2022	(Japan) Minami Katsu	Murasaki Country Club, Sumire Course	Noda, Chiba	285	−3	150,000,000	30,000,000
2021	(Japan) Minami Katsu	Tomei Country Club	Susono, Shizuoka	270	−14	150,000,000	30,000,000
2020	(Japan) Erika Hara	Classic Golf Club	Miyawaka, Fukuoka	272	−16	112,500,000	22,500,000
2019	(Japan) Nasa Hataoka	Cocopa Resort Club, Queen's Course	Tsu, Mie	270	−18	150,000,000	30,000,000
2018	(South Korea) Ryu So-yeon	Chiba Country Club, Noda Course	Noda, Chiba	273	−15	140,000,000	28,000,000
2017	(Japan) Nasa Hataoka	Abiko Golf Club	Abiko, Chiba	268	−20	140,000,000	28,000,000
2016	(Japan) Nasa Hataoka (a)	Karasuyamajo Country Club, Sannomaru Course	Nasukarasuyama, Tochigi	280	−4	140,000,000	28,000,000
2015	(South Korea) Chun In-gee	Katayamazu Golf Club, Hakusan Course	Kaga, Ishikawa	286	−2	140,000,000	28,000,000
2014	(Taiwan) Teresa Lu	Biwako Country Club	Rittō, Shiga	280	−8	140,000,000	28,000,000
2013	(Japan) Mika Miyazato	Sagamihara Golf Club, East Course	Sagamihara, Kanagawa	288	E	140,000,000	28,000,000
2012	(China) Shanshan Feng	Yokohama County Club, West Course	Yokohama, Kanagawa	288	E	140,000,000	28,000,000
2011	(Japan) Yukari Baba	Nagoya Golf Club	Togo, Aichi	292	+12	140,000,000	28,000,000
2010	(Japan) Mika Miyazato	Otone Country Club, East Course	Bando, Ibaraki	276	−12	140,000,000	28,000,000
2009	(South Korea) Song Bo-bae	Abiko Golf Club	Abiko, Chiba	277	−11	140,000,000	28,000,000
2008	(South Korea) Lee Ji-hee	Shiun Golf Club, Kajikawa Course	Shibata, Niigata	284	−4	140,000,000	28,000,000
2007	(Japan) Shinobu Moromizato	Tarumae Country Club	Tomakomai, Hokkaido	282	−6	140,000,000	28,000,000
2006	(South Korea) Jang Jeong	Ibaraki Country Club	Ibaraki, Osaka	279	−9	140,000,000	28,000,000
2005	(Japan) Ai Miyazato	Totsuka Country Club, West Course	Yokohama, Kanagawa	283	−5	70,000,000	14,000,000
2004	(Japan) Yuri Fudoh	Hiroshima Country Club, Hachihonmatsu Course	Higashihiroshima, Hiroshima	280	−8	70,000,000	14,000,000
2003	(Japan) Michiko Hattori	Chiba Country Club, Noda Course	Noda, Chiba	287	−1	70,000,000	14,000,000
2002	(South Korea) Ko Woo-soon	Hakone Country Club	Hakone, Kanagawa	278	−14	70,000,000	14,000,000
2001	(Japan) Miyuki Shimabukuro	Muroran Golf Club	Muroran, Hokkaido	302	+14	70,000,000	14,000,000
2000	(Japan) Kaori Higo	Hanno Golf Club	Hanno, Saitama	293	+5	70,000,000	14,000,000
1999	(Japan) Mayumi Murai	Kasumigaseki Country Club	Kawagoe, Saitama	281	−7	70,000,000	14,000,000
1998	(Japan) Natsuko Noro	Miyoshi Country Club, West Course	Miyoshi, Aichi	286	−2	70,000,000	14,000,000
1997	(Japan) Ayako Okamoto	Higashihirono Golf Club	Miki, Hyōgo	295	+7	70,000,000	14,000,000
1996	(Japan) Aki Takamura	Ryugasaki Country Club	Ryugasaki, Ibaraki	291	+3	70,000,000	14,000,000
1995	(Japan) Ikuyo Shiotani	Ube Country Club, Mannenike West Course	Yamaguchi, Yamaguchi	285	−3	60,000,000	9,720,000
1994	(Japan) Michiko Hattori	Musashi Country Club, Sasai Course	Sayama, Saitama	287	−1	60,000,000	10,800,000
1993	(Japan) Ayako Okamoto	Higashinagoya Country Club	Toyota, Aichi	288	E	60,000,000	10,800,000
1992	(Japan) Atsuko Hikage	Meishin Youkaichi Country Club	Higashiomi, Shiga	287	−1	60,000,000	10,800,000
1991	(Taiwan) Tu Ai-yu	Sapporo Golf Club, Wattsu Course	Kitahiroshima, Hokkaido	292	E	50,000,000	9,000,000
1990	(Japan) Yuko Moriguchi	Gifuseki Country Club	Seki, Gifu	288	E	40,000,000	8,000,000
1989	(Japan) Hiromi Kobayashi	Musashi Country Club, Toyooka Course	Iruma, Saitama	289	+1	40,000,000	8,000,000
1988	(Japan) Fukumi Tani	Dazaifu Golf Club	Dazaifu, Fukuoka	295	−1	30,000,000	6,000,000
1987	(Japan) Nayoko Yoshikawa	Tsukuba Country Club	Tsukubamirai, Ibaraki	287	−1	30,000,000	6,000,000
1986	(Taiwan) Tu Ai-yu	Omi Country Club	Konan, Shiga	293	−3	25,000,000	4,000,000
1985	(Japan) Yuko Moriguchi	Sodegaura Country Club	Chiba, Chiba	293	−3	25,000,000	4,000,000
1984	(Japan) Tatsuko Ohsako	Kanra Country Club	Kanra, Gunma	286	−2	25,000,000	4,000,000
1983	(Taiwan) Tu Ai-yu	Awara Country Club, Sea Course	Awara, Fukui	218	−1	25,000,000	4,000,000
1982	(Japan) Atsuko Hikage	Forest Golf Club, West Course	Shibata, Niigata	285	−3	25,000,000	4,000,000
1981	(Japan) Tatsuko Ohsako	Sohsei Country Club	Narita, Chiba	213	−3	20,000,000	3,000,000
1980	(Japan) Hisako Higuchi	Kasugai Country Club, West Course	Kasugai, Aichi	216	−6	20,000,000	3,000,000
1979	(Japan) Nayoko Yoshikawa	Hiroshima Country Club, Hachihonmatsu Course	Higashihiroshima, Hiroshima	218	+2	20,000,000	3,000,000
1978	(Japan) Takako Kiyomoto	Rose Bay Country Club	Annaka, Gunma	219	E	20,000,000	3,000,000
1977	(Japan) Hisako Higuchi	Hanayashiki Golf Club, Hirono Course	Miki, Hyogo	216	−6	20,000,000	3,000,000
1976	(Japan) Hisako Higuchi	Hamamatsu Seaside Golf Club	Iwata, Shizuoka	220	+1	20,000,000	3,000,000
1975	(Japan) Ayako Nihei	Karasuyamajo Country Club	Nasukarasuyama, Tochigi	225	+3	15,000,000	2,500,000
1974	(Japan) Hisako Higuchi	Meishin Youkaichi Country Club	Higashiomi, Shiga	224	+8	10,000,000	2,000,000
1973	(Japan) Noriko Kobayashi	Meiyon Country Club	Yokkaichi, Mie	219	+3	5,000,000	1,000,000
1972	(Japan) Masako Sasaki	Hamamatsu Seaside Golf Club	Iwata, Shizuoka	224	+5	2,390,000	600,000
1971	(Japan) Hisako Higuchi	Otone Country Club, West Course	Bando, Ibaraki	221	+5	2,020,000	500,000
1970	(Japan) Hisako Higuchi	TBS Koshigaya Golf Club	Yoshikawa, Saitama	226	+4	1,440,000	500,000
1969	(Japan) Hisako Higuchi	TBS Koshigaya Golf Club	Yoshikawa, Saitama	142	−6	1,020,000	300,000
1968	(Japan) Hisako Higuchi	TBS Koshigaya Golf Club	Yoshikawa, Saitama	148	E	500,000	200,000
