= LPGA of Japan Tour =

Professional golf tour for women

- Current season, competition or edition: 2026 LPGA of Japan Tour
- Sport: Golf
- Founded: 1968
- CEO: Hiromi Kobayashi
- Country: Japan
- Most titles: (Japan) Hisako Higuchi (69)
- Website: LPGA.or.jp

The LPGA of Japan Tour (Japanese: 日本女子プロゴルフ協会, romanized: Nihon joshi puro gorufu kyōkai) is a professional golf tour for women organised by the Japan Ladies Professional Golfers' Association. The tour was founded in 1968. It is the second richest women's golf tour in the world. The U.S.-based LPGA Tour is the most important women's tour, but the prize money gap has closed markedly since the American tour's total prize fund peaked at just over $60 million in 2008. While the Japan Tour is the second-most lucrative women's tour, two other non-U.S. tours, the Ladies European Tour and the LPGA of Korea Tour, rival the Japan Tour in level of competition. The LPGA of Japan Tour has attracted international players. As of 2022, 120 international golfers from more than 10 countries including Taiwan, Philippines, Korea, China, France, the United States, Australia, New Zealand, Malaysia, Brazil and Thailand have come to compete on the tour.

The tour has four major events, the Japan LPGA Championship Konica Minolta Cup, the Japan Women’s Open, the World Ladies Championship and the final event, the Japan LPGA Tour Championship.

In 2014, Minami Katsu became the youngest tournament winner in the history of the LPGA of Japan when she won the Vantelin Ladies Open at age 15. In 2022, Miyū Yamashita became the youngest tour winner, at 21 years, 103 days.

== Schedule ==
The 2026 schedule includes 36 events played in Japan and 1 played in Taiwan.

== Leading money winners ==
| Year | Player | Earnings (¥) |
|---|---|---|
| 2025 | (Japan) Shuri Sakuma | 227,285,959 |
| 2024 | (Japan) Rio Takeda | 265,730,016 |
| 2023 | (Japan) Miyū Yamashita | 213,554,215 |
| 2022 | (Japan) Miyū Yamashita | 235,020,967 |
| 2020–21 | (Japan) Mone Inami | 255,192,049 |
| 2019 | (Japan) Ai Suzuki | 160,189,665 |
| 2018 | (South Korea) Ahn Sun-ju | 180,784,885 |
| 2017 | (Japan) Ai Suzuki | 140,122,631 |
| 2016 | (South Korea) Lee Bo-mee | 175,869,764 |
| 2015 | (South Korea) Lee Bo-mee | 230,497,057 |
| 2014 | (South Korea) Ahn Sun-ju | 153,075,741 |
| 2013 | (Japan) Rikako Morita | 126,675,049 |
| 2012 | (South Korea) Jeon Mi-jeong | 131,827,582 |
| 2011 | (South Korea) Ahn Sun-ju | 127,926,893 |
| 2010 | (South Korea) Ahn Sun-ju | 145,073,799 |
| 2009 | (Japan) Sakura Yokomine | 175,016,384 |
| 2008 | (Japan) Miho Koga | 120,854,137 |
| 2007 | (Japan) Momoko Ueda | 166,112,232 |
| 2006 | (Japan) Shiho Oyama | 166,290,957 |
| 2005 | (Japan) Yuri Fudoh | 122,460,908 |
| 2004 | (Japan) Yuri Fudoh | 142,774,000 |
| 2003 | (Japan) Yuri Fudoh | 149,325,679 |
| 2002 | (Japan) Yuri Fudoh | 95,690,917 |
| 2001 | (Japan) Yuri Fudoh | 89,248,793 |
| 2000 | (Japan) Yuri Fudoh | 120,443,924 |
| 1999 | (Japan) Fumiko Muraguchi | 66,891,682 |
| 1998 | (Japan) Michiko Hattori | 81,570,823 |
| 1997 | (Japan) Akiko Fukushima | 99,594,094 |
| 1996 | (Japan) Akiko Fukushima | 70,596,190 |
| 1995 | (Japan) Ikuyo Shiotani | 75,006,561 |
| 1994 | (Japan) Mayumi Hirase | 69,817,958 |
| 1993 | (Japan) Mayumi Hirase | 81,474,399 |
| 1992 | (Japan) Ikuyo Shiotani | 57,799,649 |
| 1991 | (Taiwan) Ai-Yu Tu | 70,403,481 |
| 1990 | (Japan) Hiromi Takamura | 62,576,087 |
| 1989 | (Taiwan) Ai-Yu Tu | 90,075,587 |
| 1988 | (Japan) Nayoko Yoshikawa | 61,462,665 |
| 1987 | (Japan) Tatsuko Ohsako | 56,763,481 |
| 1986 | (Taiwan) Ai-Yu Tu | 62,435,225 |
| 1985 | (Taiwan) Ai-Yu Tu | 65,634,788 |
| 1984 | (Taiwan) Ai-Yu Tu | 52,897,845 |
| 1983 | (Taiwan) Ai-Yu Tu | 45,764,313 |
| 1982 | (Taiwan) Ai-Yu Tu | 39,029,644 |
| 1981 | (Japan) Ayako Okamoto | 32,333,465 |
| 1980 | (Japan) Tatsuko Ohsako | 23,594,744 |
| 1979 | (Japan) Hisako Higuchi | 18,399,345 |
| 1978 | (Japan) Hisako Higuchi | 11,664,650 |
| 1977 | (Japan) Tatsuko Ohsako | 14,481,500 |
| 1976 | (Japan) Hisako Higuchi | 14,667,000 |
| 1975 | (Japan) Hisako Higuchi | 8,428,233 |
| 1974 | (Japan) Hisako Higuchi | 15,545,700 |
| 1973 | (Japan) Hisako Higuchi | 12,627,000 |
| 1972 | (Japan) Hisako Higuchi | 4,150,000 |
| 1971 | (Japan) Hisako Higuchi | 2,290,000 |
| 1970 | (Japan) Hisako Higuchi | 1,215,000 |
| 1969 | (Japan) Hisako Higuchi | 500,000 |
| 1968 | (Japan) Hisako Higuchi | 350,000 |

== See also ==
- List of golfers with most LPGA of Japan Tour wins
- Women's World Golf Rankings
- Professional golf tours
- Japan Golf Association
- Korean players' victories on LPGA of Japan Tour
- Women's sports
