= 2017 LPGA of Japan Tour =

The 2017 LPGA of Japan Tour was the 50th season of the LPGA of Japan Tour, the professional golf tour for women operated by the Ladies Professional Golfers' Association of Japan. The 2017 schedule included 38 official events worth ¥3.710 billion.

Leading money winner was Ai Suzuki with ¥140,122,631. She also won the Mercedes Ranking and tied with Momoko Ueda for finishing most often (16 times) inside the top-10. Jiyai Shin had the lowest scoring average.

== Schedule ==
The number in parentheses after winners' names show the player's total number wins in official money individual events on the LPGA of Japan Tour, including that event. All tournaments were played in Japan.

Dates	Tournament	Location	Prize fund (¥)	Winner
Mar 2–5	Daikin Orchid Ladies Golf Tournament	Okinawa	120,000,000	(South Korea) Ahn Sun-ju (23)
Mar 10–12	Yokohama Tire Golf Tournament PRGR Ladies Cup	Kōchi	80,000,000	(South Korea) Jeon Mi-jeong (25)
Mar 17–19	T-Point Ladies Golf Tournament	Kagoshima	70,000,000	(Japan) Erika Kikuchi (3)
Mar 24–26	AXA Ladies Golf Tournament in Miyazaki	Miyazaki	80,000,000	(Japan) Maiko Wakabayashi (3)
Mar 30 – Apr 2	Yamaha Ladies Open Katsuragi	Shizuoka	100,000,000	(South Korea) Lee Min-young (1)
Apr 7–9	Studio Alice Women's Open	Hyogo	60,000,000	(Taiwan) Teresa Lu (13)
Apr 14–16	KKT Cup Vantelin Ladies Open	Kumamoto	100,000,000	(Japan) Yukari Nishiyama (2)
Apr 21–23	Fujisankei Ladies Classic	Shizuoka	80,000,000	(Japan) Yumiko Yoshida (6)
Apr 28–30	Cyber Agent Ladies Golf Tournament	Shizuoka	70,000,000	(South Korea) Kim Ha-neul (4)
May 4–7	**World Ladies Championship Salonpas Cup**	Ibaraki	120,000,000	(South Korea) Kim Ha-neul (5)
May 12–14	Hoken No Madoguchi Ladies	Fukuoka	120,000,000	(Japan) Ai Suzuki (4)
May 19–21	Chukyo TV Bridgestone Ladies Open	Aichi	70,000,000	(Japan) Momoko Ueda (12)
May 26–28	Resort Trust Ladies	Nara	80,000,000	(South Korea) Kang Soo-yun (3)
Jun 2–4	Yonex Ladies Golf Tournament	Niigata	70,000,000	(Japan) Serena Aoki (1)
Jun 8–11	Suntory Ladies Open Golf Tournament	Hyogo	100,000,000	(South Korea) Kim Ha-neul (6)
Jun 16–18	Nichirei Ladies	Chiba	80,000,000	(Taiwan) Teresa Lu (14)
Jun 22–25	Earth Mondahmin Cup	Chiba	180,000,000	(Japan) Ai Suzuki (5)
Jul 7–9	Nipponham Ladies Classic	Hokkaido	100,000,000	(South Korea) Lee Min-young (2)
Jul 14–16	Samantha Thavasa Girls Collection Ladies Tournament	Ibaraki	60,000,000	(South Korea) Kim Hae-rym (1)
Jul 21–23	Century 21 Ladies Golf Tournament	Shiga	80,000,000	(Japan) Lala Anai (2)
Jul 27–30	Daito Kentaku Eheyanet Ladies	Yamanashi	120,000,000	(Japan) Misuzu Narita (8)
Aug 4–6	Hokkaido Meiji Cup	Hokkaido	90,000,000	(China) Haruka Morita-WanyaoLu (1)
Aug 11–13	NEC Karuizawa 72 Golf Tournament	Nagano	80,000,000	(Japan) Mamiko Higa (3)
Aug 18–20	CAT Ladies	Kanagawa	60,000,000	(South Korea) Lee Bo-mee (21)
Aug 24–27	Nitori Ladies Golf Tournament	Hokkaido	100,000,000	(South Korea) Jiyai Shin (16)
Sep 1–3	Golf5 Ladies	Chiba	60,000,000	(Thailand) Onnarin Sattayabanphot (3)
Sep 7–10	**Japan LPGA Championship Konica Minolta Cup**	Iwate	200,000,000	(South Korea) Lee Ji-hee (22)
Sep 15–17	Munsingwear Ladies Tokai Classic	Aichi	80,000,000	(Japan) Fumika Kawagishi (1)
Sep 22–24	Miyagi TV Cup Dunlop Women's Open Golf Tournament	Miyagi	70,000,000	(Japan) Nasa Hataoka (2)
Sep 28 – Oct 1	**Japan Women's Open Golf Championship**	Chiba	140,000,000	(Japan) Nasa Hataoka (3)
Oct 6–8	Stanley Ladies Golf Tournament	Shizuoka	90,000,000	(Japan) Yumiko Yoshida (7)
Oct 13–15	Fujitsu Ladies	Chiba	80,000,000	(Taiwan) Teresa Lu (15)
Oct 19–22	Nobuta Group Masters GC Ladies	Hyogo	180,000,000	(Japan) Momoko Ueda (13)
Oct 27–29	Hisako Higuchi Mitsubishi Electric Ladies Golf Tournament	Saitama	80,000,000	(Japan) Kana Nagai (1)
Nov 3–5	Toto Japan Classic	Ibaraki	US$1,500,000	(China) Shanshan Feng (7)
Nov 10–12	Ito En Ladies Golf Tournament	Chiba	100,000,000	(Japan) Mami Fukuda (1)
Nov 16–19	Daio Paper Elleair Ladies Open	Ehime	100,000,000	(South Korea) Jiyai Shin (17)
Nov 23–26	**Japan LPGA Tour Championship Ricoh Cup**	Miyazaki	100,000,000	(Taiwan) Teresa Lu (16)

Events in bold are majors.
The Toto Japan Classic is co-sanctioned with the LPGA Tour.
