= 2014 LPGA of Japan Tour =

The 2014 LPGA of Japan Tour was the 47th season of the LPGA of Japan Tour, the professional golf tour for women operated by the Ladies Professional Golfers' Association of Japan. It consisted of 37 golf tournaments, all played in Japan.

Leading money winner was Ahn Sun-ju with ¥153,075,741. She also won the Mercedes Ranking, had the lowest scoring average and tied with Lee Bo-mee for finishing most often (17 times) inside the top-10.

== Schedule ==
The number in parentheses after winners' names show the player's total number wins in official money individual events on the LPGA of Japan Tour, including that event.

Dates	Tournament	Location	Prize fund (¥)	Winner
Mar 7–9	Daikin Orchid Ladies Golf Tournament	Okinawa	100,000,000	(Thailand) Onnarin Sattayabanphot (2)
Mar 14–16	Yokohama Tire Golf Tournament PRGR Ladies Cup	Kōchi	80,000,000	(Japan) Yuki Ichinose (2)
Mar 21–23	T-Point Ladies Golf Tournament	Saga	70,000,000	(Japan) Rikako Morita (7)
Mar 28–30	AXA Ladies Golf Tournament in Miyazaki	Miyazaki	80,000,000	(Japan) Ayaka Watanabe (1)
Apr 3–6	Yamaha Ladies Open Katsuragi	Shizuoka	100,000,000	(South Korea) Ahn Sun-ju (14)
Apr 11–13	Studio Alice Women's Open	Hyogo	60,000,000	(South Korea) Esther Lee (1)
Apr 18–20	KKT Cup Vantelin Ladies Open	Kumamoto	100,000,000	(Japan) Minami Katsu (a) (1)
Apr 25–27	Fuji Sankei Ladies Classic	Shizuoka	80,000,000	(Taiwan) Phoebe Yao (1)
May 2–4	CyberAgent Ladies Golf Tournament	Chiba	70,000,000	(Japan) Yuki Ichinose (3)
May 8–11	**World Ladies Championship Salonpas Cup**	Ibaraki	120,000,000	(Japan) Misuzu Narita (3)
May 16–18	Hoken No Madoguchi Ladies	Fukuoka	120,000,000	(South Korea) Lee Bo-mee (6)
May 23–25	Chukyo TV Bridgestone Ladies Open	Aichi	70,000,000	(South Korea) Ahn Sun-ju (15)
May 30 – Jun 1	Resort Trust Ladies	Hyogo	70,000,000	(Taiwan) Teresa Lu (2)
Jun 6–8	Yonex Ladies Golf Tournament	Niigata	60,000,000	(Japan) Misuzu Narita (4)
Jun 12–15	Suntory Ladies Open	Hyogo	100,000,000	(South Korea) Ahn Sun-ju (16)
Jun 20–22	Nichirei Ladies	Chiba	80,000,000	(South Korea) Jiyai Shin (6)
Jun 26–29	Earth Mondahmin Cup	Chiba	140,000,000	(Japan) Miki Sakai (1)
Jul 4–6	Nichi-Iko Women's Open Golf Tournament	Toyama	60,000,000	(South Korea) Jung Yeon-ju (1)
Jul 18–20	Samantha Thavasa Girls Collection Ladies Tournament	Ibaraki	60,000,000	(Japan) Misuzu Narita (5)
Jul 25–27	Century 21 Ladies Golf Tournament	Shizuoka	60,000,000	(South Korea) Lee Bo-mee (7)
Aug 8–10	Meiji Cup	Hokkaido	90,000,000	(South Korea) Jiyai Shin (7)
Aug 15–17	NEC Karuizawa 72 Golf Tournament	Nagano	70,000,000	(South Korea) Lee Bo-mee (8)
Aug 22–24	CAT Ladies	Kanagawa	60,000,000	(Japan) Momoko Ueda (10)
Aug 29–31	Nitori Ladies Golf Tournament	Hokkaido	70,000,000	(South Korea) Jiyai Shin (8)
Sep 5–7	Golf5 Ladies	Gifu	60,000,000	(Japan) Shiho Oyama (14)
Sep 11–14	**Japan LPGA Championship Konica Minolta Cup**	Hyogo	140,000,000	(Japan) Ai Suzuki (1)
Sep 19–21	Munsingwear Ladies Tokai Classic	Aichi	80,000,000	(South Korea) Jiyai Shin (9)
Sep 26–28	Miyagi TV Cup Dunlop Women's Open Golf Tournament	Miyagi	70,000,000	(Japan) Miki Sakai (2)
Oct 2–5	**Japan Women's Open Golf Championship**	Shiga	140,000,000	(Taiwan) Teresa Lu (3)
Oct 10–12	Stanley Ladies Golf Tournament	Shizuoka	90,000,000	(South Korea) Ahn Sun-ju (17)
Oct 17–19	Fujitsu Ladies	Chiba	80,000,000	(South Korea) Ahn Sun-ju (18)
Oct 23–26	Nobuta Group Masters GC Ladies	Hyogo	140,000,000	(Japan) Shiho Oyama (15)
Oct 30 – Nov 2	Hisako Higuchi – Morinaga Ladies	Chiba	70,000,000	(Japan) Momoko Ueda (11)
Nov 7–9	Mizuno Classic	Mie	US$1,200,000	(South Korea) Lee Mi-hyang (1)
Nov 14–16	Ito En Ladies Golf Tournament	Chiba	100,000,000	(Japan) Yoko Maeda (1)
Nov 20–23	Daio Paper Elleair Ladies Open	Kagawa	100,000,000	(Japan) Sakura Yokomine (23)
Nov 27–30	**Japan LPGA Tour Championship Ricoh Cup**	Miyazaki	100,000,000	(Taiwan) Teresa Lu (4)

Events in bold are majors.
(a) denotes amateur

The Mizuno Classic is co-sanctioned with the LPGA Tour.
