= 2011 LPGA of Japan Tour =

The 2011 LPGA of Japan Tour was the 44th season of the LPGA of Japan Tour, the professional golf tour for women operated by the Ladies Professional Golfers' Association of Japan. It consisted of 34 golf tournaments, all played in Japan. Four events were canceled due to the 2011 Tōhoku earthquake and tsunami.

Ahn Sun-ju won the Order of Merit and had the lowest scoring average. Lee Ji-Hee finished most often (19 times) inside the top-10.

== Tournament results ==
Dates	Tournament	Location	Prize fund (JPY)	Winner
Mar 4–6	Daikin Orchid Ladies	Okinawa	80,000,000	(South Korea) Inbee Park (3)
Mar 11–13	Yokohama Tire PRGR Ladies Cup	Kōchi	80,000,000	Canceled because of earthquake
Mar 18–20	T-Point Ladies	Kagoshima	70,000,000	Canceled because of earthquake
Apr 1–3	Yamaha Ladies Open	Shizuoka	80,000,000	Canceled because of earthquake
Apr 8–10	Studio Alice Ladies Open	Hyogo	60,000,000	Canceled because of earthquake
Apr 15–17	Nishijin Ladies Classic	Kumamoto	70,000,000	(Japan) Yuri Fudoh (49)
Apr 22–24	Fujisankei Ladies Classic	Shizuoka	80,000,000	(Japan) Kumiko Kaneda (1)
Apr 29 – May 1	Cyber Agent Ladies	Chiba	70,000,000	(Japan) Yuri Fudoh (50)
May 5–8	**World Ladies Championship Salonpas Cup**	Ibaraki	120,000,000	(South Korea) Ahn Sun-ju (5)
May 13–15	Fundokin Ladies	Fukuoka	80,000,000	(Japan) Miki Saiki (3)
May 20–22	Chukyo TV Bridgestone Ladies Open	Aichi	70,000,000	(Japan) Harukyo Nomura (1)
May 27–29	Yonex Ladies	Niigata	60,000,000	(Japan) Hiromi Mogi (5)
Jun 3–5	Resort Trust Ladies	Nagano	70,000,000	(Japan) Sakura Yokomine (18)
Jun 9–12	Suntory Ladies Open	Hyogo	100,000,000	(South Korea) Ahn Sun-ju (6)
Jun 17–19	Nichirei Ladies	Chiba	80,000,000	(South Korea) Lee Ji-hee (14)
Jul 1–3	Nichi-Iko Ladies Open	Toyama	60,000,000	(Japan) Ayako Uehara (3)
Jul 15–17	Stanley Ladies	Shizuoka	90,000,000	(Japan) Chie Arimura (8)
Aug 5–7	Meiji Cup	Hokkaido	90,000,000	(China) Shanshan Feng (1)
Aug 12–14	NEC Karuizawa 72	Nagano	70,000,000	(South Korea) Ahn Sun-ju (7)
Aug 19–21	CAT Ladies	Kanagawa	60,000,000	(Japan) Chie Arimura (9)
Aug 26–28	Nitori Ladies	Hokkaido	90,000,000	(Japan) Ritsuko Ryu (1)
Sep 2–4	Golf5 Ladies	Gifu	60,000,000	(China) Ye Liying (1)
Sep 8–11	**Japan LPGA Championship Konica Minolta Cup**	Chiba	140,000,000	(Japan) Yuko Mitsuka (4)
Sep 16–18	Munsingwear Ladies Tokai Classic	Aichi	80,000,000	(Japan) Mayu Hattori (3)
Sep 23–25	Miyagi TV Cup Dunlop Ladies Open	Miyagi	70,000,000	(China) Shanshan Feng (2)
Sep 29 – Oct 2	**Japan Women's Open Golf Championship**	Aichi	140,000,000	(Japan) Yukari Baba (3)
Oct 7–9	Sankyo Ladies Open	(Japan) Gunma	100,000,000	(South Korea) Ahn Sun-ju (8)
Oct 14–16	Fujitsu Ladies	(Japan) Chiba	80,000,000	(Japan) Saiki Fujita (5)
Oct 21–23	Masters GC Ladies	(Japan) Hyogo	123,000,000	(Japan) Shiho Oyama (12)
Oct 28–30	Hisako Higuchi – Morinaga Weider Ladies	(Japan) Chiba	70,000,000	(Japan) Chie Arimura (10)
Nov 4–6	Mizuno Classic	(Japan) Mie	US$1,200,000	(Japan) Momoko Ueda (9)
Nov 11–13	Ito En Ladies	(Japan) Chiba	90,000,000	(Japan) Asako Fujimoto (1)
Nov 18–20	Daio Paper Elleair Ladies Open	(Japan) Kagawa	100,000,000	(South Korea) Lee Ji-hee (15)
Nov 24–27	**Japan LPGA Tour Championship Ricoh Cup**	(Japan) Miyazaki	100,000,000	(South Korea) Jeon Mi-jeong (17)
Dec 11	Hitachi 3Tours Championship	(Japan) Chiba	57,000,000	LPGA of Japan Tour

For the official tour schedule on the LPGA of Japan Tour's website, including links to full results, click here.

Events in bold are majors.

The Mizuno Classic is co-sanctioned with the LPGA Tour.

== Leading money winners ==
Rank	Player	Country	Prize money (¥)
1	Ahn Sun-ju	South Korea	127,926,893
2	Lee Ji-hee	South Korea	102,317,057
3	Chie Arimura	Japan	88,689,388
4	Sakura Yokomine	Japan	87,304,130
5	Yukari Baba	Japan	76,293,839
6	Jeon Mi-jeong	South Korea	67,777,540
7	Shanshan Feng	China	67,139,194
8	Miki Saiki	Japan	62,729,018
9	Yuri Fudoh	Japan	60,518,023
10	Ritsuko Ryu	Japan	57,560,409

There is a complete list on the official site here.

== See also ==
- 2011 in golf
