= 2020–21 LPGA of Japan Tour =

The 2020–21 LPGA of Japan Tour was the 53rd season of the LPGA of Japan Tour, the professional golf tour for women operated by the Japan Ladies Professional Golfers′ Association. Because of the COVID-19 pandemic, the 2020 season was combined with the 2021 season. Only 14 of the original 37 events were played in 2020.

Leading money winner was Mone Inami with ¥255,192,049. She also had the lowest scoring average and finished most often (25 times) inside the top ten. Ayaka Furue won the Mercedes Ranking.

== Schedule ==
The number in parentheses after winners' names shows the player's total number wins in official money individual events on the LPGA of Japan Tour, including that event.

Date	Tournament	Location	Prize fund (¥)	Winner	WWGR pts
8 Mar 2020	Daikin Orchid Ladies Golf Tournament	Okinawa	120,000,000	Canceled	–
15 Mar 2020	Meiji Yasuda Life Ladies Yokohama Tire Golf Tournament	Kōchi	80,000,000	Canceled	–
22 Mar 2020	T-Point ENEOS Golf Tournament	Kagoshima	100,000,000	Canceled	–
29 Mar 2020	AXA Ladies Golf Tournament in Miyazaki	Miyazaki	80,000,000	Canceled	–
5 Apr 2020	Yamaha Ladies Open Katsuragi	Shizuoka	100,000,000	Canceled	–
12 Apr 2020	Studio Alice Women's Open	Hyōgo	60,000,000	Canceled	–
19 Apr 2020	KKT Cup Vantelin Ladies Open	Kumamoto	100,000,000	Canceled	–
26 Apr 2020	Fuji Sankei Ladies Classic	Shizuoka	80,000,000	Canceled	–
3 May 2020	Panasonic Open Ladies Golf Tournament	Chiba	80,000,000	Canceled	–
10 May 2020	**World Ladies Championship Salonpas Cup**	Ibaraki	120,000,000	Canceled	–
17 May 2020	Hoken No Madoguchi Ladies	Fukuoka	120,000,000	Canceled	–
24 May 2020	Chukyo TV Bridgestone Ladies Open	Aichi	70,000,000	Canceled	–
31 May 2020	Resort Trust Ladies	Shizuoka	100,000,000	Canceled	–
7 Jun 2020	Yonex Ladies Golf Tournament	Niigata	70,000,000	Canceled	–
14 Jun 2020	Ai Miyazato Suntory Ladies Open Golf Tournament	Hyōgo	150,000,000	Canceled	–
21 Jun 2020	Nichirei Ladies	Chiba	80,000,000	Canceled	–
28 Jun 2020	Earth Mondahmin Cup	Chiba	240,000,000	(Japan) Ayaka Watanabe (4)	19.0
5 Jul 2020	Shiseido Anessa Ladies Open	Kanagawa	120,000,000	Canceled	–
12 Jul 2020	Nippon Ham Ladies Classic	Hokkaido	100,000,000	Canceled	–
19 Jul 2020	Samantha Thavasa & GMO Internet Girls Collection Ladies Tournament	Ibaraki	90,000,000	Canceled	–
26 Jul 2020	Daito Kentaku Eheyanet Ladies	Hokkaido	120,000,000	Canceled	–
16 Aug 2020	NEC Karuizawa 72 Golf Tournament	Nagano	80,000,000	(Philippines) Yuka Saso (1)	16.5
23 Aug 2020	CAT Ladies	Kanagawa	60,000,000	Canceled	–
30 Aug 2020	Nitori Ladies Golf Tournament	Hokkaido	200,000,000	(Philippines) Yuka Saso (2)	16.0
6 Sep 2020	Golf5 Ladies	Gifu	60,000,000	(Japan) Sakura Koiwai (2)	16.0
13 Sep 2020	**Japan LPGA Championship Konica Minolta Cup**	Okayama	300,000,000	(Japan) Saki Nagamine (2)	17.5
20 Sep 2020	Descente Ladies Tokai Classic	Aichi	80,000,000	(Japan) Ayaka Furue (2)	18.0
27 Sep 2020	Miyagi TV Cup Dunlop Ladies Open Golf Tournament	Miyagi	70,000,000	Canceled	–
4 Oct 2020	**Japan Women's Open Golf Championship**	Fukuoka	150,000,000	(Japan) Erika Hara (2)	18.5
11 Oct 2020	Stanley Ladies Golf Tournament	Shizuoka	100,000,000	(Japan) Mone Inami (2)	19.0
18 Oct 2020	Fujitsu Ladies Golf Tournament	Chiba	100,000,000	(South Korea) Jiyai Shin (25)	18.5
25 Oct 2020	Nobuta Group Masters GC Ladies	Hyōgo	240,000,000	Cancelled	–
1 Nov 2020	Mitsubishi Electric/Hisako Higuchi Ladies Golf Tournament	Saitama	80,000,000	(Japan) Yuna Nishimura (1)	19.0
8 Nov 2020	Toto Japan Classic	Ibaraki	US$1,500,000	(South Korea) Jiyai Shin (26)	19.5
15 Nov 2020	Ito En Ladies Golf Tournament	Chiba	100,000,000	(Japan) Ayaka Furue (3)	19.5
22 Nov 2020	Daio Paper Elleair Ladies Open	Ehime	100,000,000	(Japan) Ayaka Furue (4)	19.5
29 Nov 2020	**Japan LPGA Tour Championship Ricoh Cup**	Miyazaki	120,000,000	(Japan) Erika Hara (3)	18.0
7 Mar 2021	Daikin Orchid Ladies Golf Tournament	Okinawa	120,000,000	(Japan) Sakura Koiwai (3)	19.0
14 Mar 2021	Meiji Yasuda Life Ladies Yokohama Tire Golf Tournament	Kōchi	80,000,000	(Japan) Mone Inami (3)	19.0
21 Mar 2021	T-Point ENEOS Golf Tournament	Kagoshima	100,000,000	(Japan) Sakura Koiwai (4)	19.0
28 Mar 2021	AXA Ladies Golf Tournament in Miyazaki	Miyazaki	80,000,000	(Japan) Eri Okayama (2)	19.0
4 Apr 2021	Yamaha Ladies Open Katsuragi	Shizuoka	100,000,000	(Japan) Mone Inami (4)	19.0
11 Apr 2021	Fujifilm Studio Alice Ladies Open	Hyōgo	100,000,000	(Japan) Mone Inami (5)	18.5
18 Apr 2021	KKT Cup Vantelin Ladies Open	Kumamoto	100,000,000	(Japan) Miyū Yamashita (1)	18.0
25 Apr 2021	Fujisankei Ladies Classic	Shizuoka	80,000,000	(Japan) Mone Inami (6)	18.5
2 May 2021	Panasonic Open Ladies Golf Tournament	Chiba	80,000,000	(Japan) Momoko Ueda (16)	18.5
9 May 2021	**World Ladies Championship Salonpas Cup**	Ibaraki	120,000,000	(Japan) Yuna Nishimura (2)	19.5
16 May 2021	Hoken No Madoguchi Ladies	Fukuoka	120,000,000	(Japan) Momoko Osato (2)	19.5
23 May 2021	Chukyo TV Bridgestone Ladies Open	Aichi	70,000,000	(Japan) Mone Inami (7)	19.0
30 May 2021	Resort Trust Ladies	Shizuoka	100,000,000	(Japan) Minami Katsu (5)	19.0
6 Jun 2021	Yonex Ladies Golf Tournament	Niigata	70,000,000	(Japan) Ritsuko Ryu (6)	16.5
13 Jun 2021	Ai Miyazato Suntory Ladies Open Golf Tournament	Hyōgo	150,000,000	(Japan) Serena Aoki (2)	19.0
20 Jun 2021	Nichirei Ladies	Chiba	100,000,000	(South Korea) Jiyai Shin (27)	19.0
27 Jun 2021	Earth Mondahmin Cup	Chiba	300,000,000	(Japan) Erika Kikuchi (4)	19.5
4 Jul 2021	Shiseido Ladies Open	Kanagawa	120,000,000	(Japan) Ai Suzuki (17)	19.0
11 Jul 2021	Nippon Ham Ladies Classic	Hokkaido	100,000,000	(Japan) Kotone Hori (1)	18.5
18 Jul 2021	GMO Internet Ladies Samantha Thavasa Global Cup	Ibaraki	100,000,000	(Japan) Maiko Wakabayashi (4)	19.5
25 Jul 2021	Daito Kentaku Eheyanet Ladies	Hokkaido	120,000,000	(South Korea) Jiyai Shin (28)	19.0
31 Jul 2021	Rakuten Super Ladies	Hyōgo	80,000,000	(Japan) Yuri Yoshida (1)	18.5
15 Aug 2021	NEC Karuizawa 72 Golf Tournament	Nagano	80,000,000	(Japan) Sakura Koiwai (5)	−
22 Aug 2021	CAT Ladies	Kanagawa	60,000,000	(Japan) Sakura Koiwai (6)	17.0
29 Aug 2021	Nitori Ladies Golf Tournament	Hokkaido	100,000,000	(Japan) Mone Inami (8)	17.0
5 Sep 2021	Golf5 Ladies	Mie	60,000,000	(Japan) Yuri Yoshida (2)	14.0
12 Sep 2021	**Japan LPGA Championship Konica Minolta Cup**	Ibaraki	200,000,000	(Japan) Mone Inami (9)	26.0
19 Sep 2021	Sumitomo Life Vitality Ladies Tokai Classic	Aichi	100,000,000	(Japan) Yuna Nishimura (3)	19.0
26 Sep 2021	Miyagi TV Cup Dunlop Ladies Open Golf Tournament	Miyagi	70,000,000	(Japan) Yuna Nishimura (4)	19.0
3 Oct 2021	**Japan Women's Open Golf Championship**	Tochigi	150,000,000	(Japan) Minami Katsu (6)	26.0
10 Oct 2021	Stanley Ladies Golf Tournament	Shizuoka	100,000,000	(Japan) Hinako Shibuno (5)	19.0
17 Oct 2021	Fujitsu Ladies Golf Tournament	Chiba	100,000,000	(Japan) Ayaka Furue (5)	19.0
24 Oct 2021	Nobuta Group Masters GC Ladies	Hyōgo	200,000,000	(Japan) Ayaka Furue (6)	19.5
31 Oct 2021	Mitsubishi Electric/Hisako Higuchi Ladies Golf Tournament	Saitama	80,000,000	(Japan) Hinako Shibuno (6)	18.5
7 Nov 2021	Toto Japan Classic	Shiga	US$2,000,000	(Japan) Ayaka Furue (7)	19.5
14 Nov 2021	Ito En Ladies Golf Tournament	Chiba	100,000,000	(Japan) Mone Inami (10)	19.0
21 Nov 2021	Daio Paper Elleair Ladies Open	Ehime	100,000,000	(Japan) Erika Hara (4)	19.0
28 Nov 2021	**Japan LPGA Tour Championship Ricoh Cup**	Miyazaki	120,000,000	(Japan) Kana Mikashima (1)	18.5

Events in bold are majors.
The Toto Japan Classic is co-sanctioned with the LPGA Tour.
