= 2022 LPGA of Japan Tour =

54th season of the LPGA of Japan Tour

The 2022 LPGA of Japan Tour was the 54th season of the LPGA of Japan Tour, the professional golf tour for women operated by the Japan Ladies Professional Golfers' Association.

Leading money winner was Miyū Yamashita with ¥235,020,967. She also won the Mercedes Ranking, had the lowest scoring average and finished most often (21 times) inside the top-10.

== Schedule ==
The results of the season are given in the table below. "Date" is the end date of the tournament. The number in parentheses after winners' names shows the player's total number wins in official money individual events on the LPGA of Japan Tour, including that event.

Date	Tournament	Location	Prize fund (¥)	Winner	WWGR pts
6 Mar	Daikin Orchid Ladies Golf Tournament	Okinawa	120,000,000	(Japan) Mao Saigo (1)	18.5
13 Mar	Meiji Yasuda Life Ladies Yokohama Tire Golf Tournament	Kōchi	80,000,000	(Taiwan) Tsai Pei-ying (1)	18.0
20 Mar	T-Point ENEOS Golf Tournament	Kagoshima	100,000,000	(Japan) Kotone Hori (2)	18.0
27 Mar	AXA Ladies Golf Tournament in Miyazaki	Miyazaki	100,000,000	(Japan) Mao Saigo (2)	18.5
3 Apr	Yamaha Ladies Open Katsuragi	Shizuoka	100,000,000	(Japan) Mao Saigo (3)	19.0
10 Apr	Fujifilm Studio Alice Ladies Open	Saitama	100,000,000	(Japan) Momoko Ueda (17)	19.0
17 Apr	KKT Cup Vantelin Ladies Open	Kumamoto	100,000,000	(Japan) Nozomi Uetake (1)	18.0
24 Apr	Fujisankei Ladies Classic	Shizuoka	80,000,000	(Japan) Sayaka Takahashi (1)	15.5
1 May	Panasonic Open Ladies Golf Tournament	Chiba	80,000,000	(Japan) Mao Saigo (4)	19.0
8 May	**World Ladies Championship Salonpas Cup**	Ibaraki	120,000,000	(Japan) Miyū Yamashita (2)	19.0
15 May	Hoken No Madoguchi Ladies	Fukuoka	120,000,000	(Japan) Ayaka Watanabe (5)	19.0
22 May	Bridgestone Ladies Open	Chiba	100,000,000	(Japan) Mao Saigo (5)	19.0
29 May	Resort Trust Ladies	Yamanashi	100,000,000	(Japan) Sakura Koiwai (7)	16.0
5 Jun	Richard Mille Yonex Ladies Golf Tournament	Niigata	90,000,000	(Japan) Mone Inami (11)	16.0
12 Jun	Ai Miyazato Suntory Ladies Open Golf Tournament	Hyōgo	150,000,000	(Japan) Miyū Yamashita (3)	18.5
19 Jun	Nichirei Ladies	Chiba	100,000,000	(Japan) Yuna Nishimura (5)	18.0
26 Jun	Earth Mondahmin Cup	Chiba	300,000,000	(Japan) Ayako Kimura (1)	19.0
3 Jul	Shiseido Ladies Open	Kanagawa	120,000,000	(Japan) Serena Aoki (3)	19.0
10 Jul	Nippon Ham Ladies Classic	Hokkaido	100,000,000	(Japan) Yuna Nishimura (6)	19.5
24 Jul	Daito Kentaku Eheyanet Ladies	Hokkaido	120,000,000	(Japan) Erika Kikuchi (5)	17.5
31 Jul	Rakuten Super Ladies	Hyōgo	100,000,000	(Japan) Minami Katsu (7)	16.5
7 Aug	Hokkaido Meiji Cup	Hokkaido	90,000,000	(South Korea) Lee Min-young (6)	16.5
14 Aug	NEC Karuizawa 72 Golf Tournament	Nagano	80,000,000	(Japan) Chisato Iwai (1)	17.0
21 Aug	CAT Ladies	Kanagawa	60,000,000	(Japan) Chisato Iwai (2)	18.5
28 Aug	Nitori Ladies Golf Tournament	Hokkaido	100,000,000	(Japan) Mone Inami (12)	19.0
4 Sep	Golf5 Ladies	Chiba	100,000,000	(China) Shi Yu-ting (1)	19.0
11 Sep	**Japan LPGA Championship Konica Minolta Cup**	Kyoto	200,000,000	(Japan) Haruka Kawasaki (1)	26.0
18 Sep	Sumitomo Life Vitality Ladies Tokai Classic	Aichi	100,000,000	(Japan) Amiyu Ozeki (1)	19.0
25 Sep	Miyagi TV Cup Dunlop Women's Open Golf Tournament	Miyagi	70,000,000	(Japan) Miyū Yamashita (4)	18.0
2 Oct	**Japan Women's Open Golf Championship**	Chiba	150,000,000	(Japan) Minami Katsu (8)	26.0
9 Oct	Stanley Ladies Honda Golf Tournament	Shizuoka	120,000,000	(Japan) Sakura Koiwai (8)	19.0
16 Oct	Fujitsu Ladies	Chiba	100,000,000	(Japan) Ayaka Furue (8)	19.5
23 Oct	Nobuta Group Masters GC Ladies	Hyōgo	200,000,000	(Japan) Haruka Kawasaki (2)	19.5
30 Oct	Mitsubishi Electric/Hisako Higuchi Ladies Golf Tournament	Saitama	80,000,000	(Japan) Kumiko Kaneda (2)	19.5
6 Nov	Toto Japan Classic^	Shiga	US$2,000,000	(Scotland) Gemma Dryburgh (1)	34.0
13 Nov	Ito En Ladies Golf Tournament	Chiba	100,000,000	(Japan) Miyū Yamashita (5)	19.0
20 Nov	Daio Paper Elleair Ladies Open	Ehime	100,000,000	(Japan) Saiki Fujita (6)	19.0
27 Nov	**Japan LPGA Tour Championship Ricoh Cup**	Miyazaki	120,000,000	(Japan) Miyū Yamashita (6)	19.0

Events in bold are majors.
^ The Toto Japan Classic was co-sanctioned with the LPGA Tour.
