= 2019 LPGA of Japan Tour =

The 2019 LPGA of Japan Tour was the 52nd season of the LPGA of Japan Tour, the professional golf tour for women operated by the Ladies Professional Golfers' Association of Japan. The 2019 schedule included 39 official events all played in Japan.

Leading money winner was Ai Suzuki with ¥160,189,665. Hinako Shibuno won the Mercedes Ranking. Jiyai Shin had the lowest scoring average and finished most often (18 times) inside the top ten.

== Schedule ==
The number in parentheses after winners' names show the player's total number wins in official money individual events on the LPGA of Japan Tour, including that event. All tournaments are played in Japan.

| Dates | Tournament | Location | Prize fund (¥) | Winner | WWGR pts |
|---|---|---|---|---|---|
| Mar 7–10 | Daikin Orchid Ladies Golf Tournament | Okinawa | 120,000,000 | (Japan) Mamiko Higa (5) | 20.5 |
| Mar 15–17 | Yokohama Tire Golf Tournament PRGR Ladies Cup | Kōchi | 80,000,000 | (Japan) Ai Suzuki (10) | 19.5 |
| Mar 22–24 | T-Point ENEOS Golf Tournament | Osaka | 100,000,000 | (Japan) Momoko Ueda (14) | 19.5 |
| Mar 29–31 | AXA Ladies Golf Tournament in Miyazaki | Miyazaki | 80,000,000 | (Japan) Yui Kawamoto (1) | 18.5 |
| Apr 4–7 | Yamaha Ladies Open Katsuragi | Shizuoka | 100,000,000 | (Japan) Misuzu Narita (12) | 19.0 |
| Apr 12–14 | Studio Alice Women's Open | Hyogo | 60,000,000 | (South Korea) Jiyai Shin (22) | 17.0 |
| Apr 19–21 | KKT Cup Vantelin Ladies Open | Kumamoto | 100,000,000 | (South Korea) Lee Ji-hee (23) | 17.5 |
| Apr 26–28 | Fujisankei Ladies Classic | Shizuoka | 80,000,000 | (South Korea) Jiyai Shin (23) | 18.5 |
| May 3–5 | Panasonic Open Ladies Golf Tournament | Chiba | 80,000,000 | (Japan) Minami Katsu (3) | 19.0 |
| May 9–12 | **World Ladies Championship Salonpas Cup** | Ibaraki | 120,000,000 | (Japan) Hinako Shibuno (1) | 19.5 |
| May 17–19 | Hoken No Madoguchi Ladies | Fukuoka | 120,000,000 | (South Korea) Lee Min-young (4) | 19.5 |
| May 24–26 | Chukyo TV Bridgestone Ladies Open | Aichi | 70,000,000 | (Japan) Minami Katsu (4) | 17.0 |
| May 31 – Jun 2 | Resort Trust Ladies | Shizuoka | 80,000,000 | (Japan) Erika Hara (1) | 15.5 |
| Jun 7–9 | Yonex Ladies Golf Tournament | Niigata | 70,000,000 | (Japan) Momoko Ueda (15) | 17.0 |
| Jun 13–16 | Ai Miyazato Suntory Ladies Open Golf Tournament | Hyogo | 100,000,000 | (Japan) Ai Suzuki (11) | 19.5 |
| Jun 21–23 | Nichirei Ladies | Chiba | 80,000,000 | (Japan) Ai Suzuki (12) | 18.5 |
| Jun 27–30 | Earth Mondahmin Cup | Chiba | 200,000,000 | (South Korea) Jiyai Shin (24) | 19.5 |
| Jul 4–7 | Shiseido Anessa Ladies Open | Kanagawa | 120,000,000 | (Japan) Hinako Shibuno (2) | 19.0 |
| Jul 11–14 | Nipponham Ladies Classic | Hokkaido | 100,000,000 | (Thailand) Saranporn Langkulgasettrin (1) | 19.0 |
| Jul 19–21 | Samantha Thavasa Girls Collection Ladies Tournament | Ibaraki | 60,000,000 | (Japan) Sakura Koiwai (1) | 15.5 |
| Jul 26–28 | Century 21 Ladies Golf Tournament | Saitama | 80,000,000 | (Japan) Mone Inami (1) | 16.0 |
| Aug 1–4 | Daito Kentaku Eheyanet Ladies | Yamanashi | 120,000,000 | (Japan) Misuzu Narita (13) | 17.5 |
| Aug 9–11 | Hokkaido Meiji Cup | Hokkaido | 90,000,000 | (South Korea) Bae Seon-woo (1) | 19.5 |
| Aug 16–18 | NEC Karuizawa 72 Golf Tournament | Nagano | 80,000,000 | (Japan) Lala Anai (3) | 19.5 |
| Aug 23–25 | CAT Ladies | Kanagawa | 60,000,000 | (Japan) Saki Asai (1) | 17.0 |
| Aug 29 – Sep 1 | Nitori Ladies Golf Tournament | Hokkaido | 100,000,000 | (Japan) Ai Suzuki (13) | 19.0 |
| Sep 6–8 | Golf5 Ladies | Ibaraki | 60,000,000 | (South Korea) Lee Min-young (5) | 17.0 |
| Sep 12–15 | **Japan LPGA Championship Konica Minolta Cup** | Hyogo | 200,000,000 | (Japan) Nasa Hataoka (5) | 22.0 |
| Sep 20–22 | Descente Ladies Tokai Classic | Aichi | 80,000,000 | (Japan) Hinako Shibuno (3) | 20.5 |
| Sep 27–29 | Miyagi TV Cup Dunlop Women's Open Golf Tournament | Miyagi | 70,000,000 | (Japan) Asuka Kashiwabara (1) | 19.0 |
| Oct 3–6 | **Japan Women's Open Golf Championship** | Mie | 150,000,000 | (Japan) Nasa Hataoka (6) | 20.5 |
| Oct 11–13 | Stanley Ladies Golf Tournament | Shizuoka | 100,000,000 | (South Korea) Hwang Ah-reum (5) | – |
| Oct 18–20 | Fujitsu Ladies | Chiba | 80,000,000 | (Japan) Ayaka Furue (1, amateur) | 17.5 |
| Oct 24–27 | Nobuta Group Masters GC Ladies | Hyogo | 200,000,000 | (Japan) Asuka Kashiwabara (2) | 20.5 |
| Nov 1–3 | Hisako Higuchi Mitsubishi Electric Ladies Golf Tournament | Saitama | 80,000,000 | (Japan) Ai Suzuki (14) | 18.5 |
| Nov 8–10 | Toto Japan Classic | Shiga | US$1,500,000 | (Japan) Ai Suzuki (15) | 43.0 |
| Nov 15–17 | Ito En Ladies Golf Tournament | Chiba | 100,000,000 | (Japan) Ai Suzuki (16) | 19.5 |
| Nov 21–24 | Daio Paper Elleair Ladies Open | Ehime | 100,000,000 | (Japan) Hinako Shibuno (4) | 19.5 |
| Nov 28 – Dec 1 | **Japan LPGA Tour Championship Ricoh Cup** | Miyazaki | 120,000,000 | (South Korea) Bae Seon-woo (2) | 19.0 |

Events in bold were majors.
The Toto Japan Classic was co-sanctioned with the LPGA Tour.
