= Jiyai Shin =

South Korean professional golfer (born 1988)

Jiyai Shin 신지애
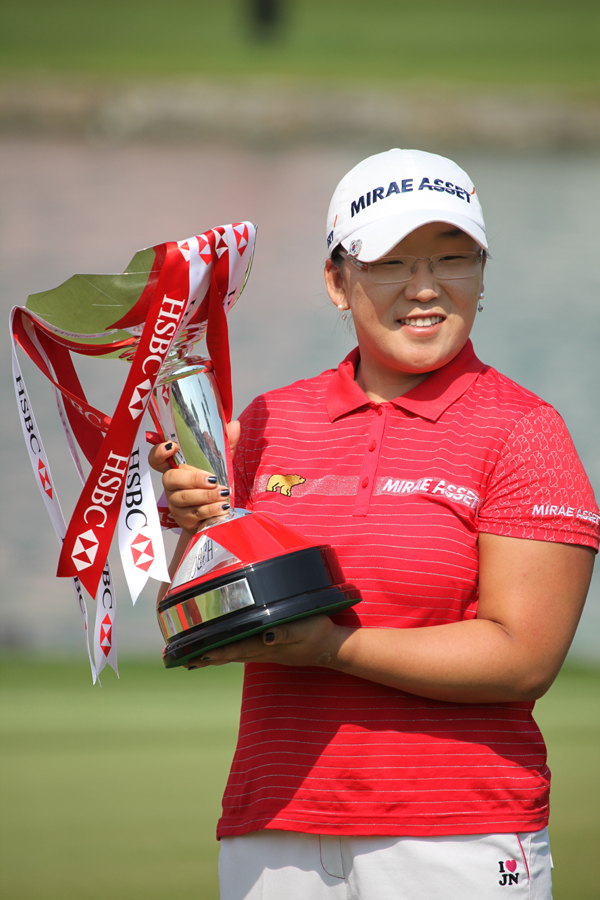
- Shin at the 2009 HSBC Women's Champions

Personal information
- Full name: Jiyai Shin
- Nickname: Final Round Queen
- Nationality: South Korea
- Born: 28 April 1988 (age 38) Yeonggwang-gun, South Jeolla Province, South Korea
- Height: 5 ft 2 in (1.57 m)

Career
- Sport: Golf
- College: Yonsei University
- Turned professional: 2005
- Current tours: LPGA of Japan Tour (joined 2005); LPGA of Korea Tour (joined 2005)
- Former tour: LPGA Tour (2009–2013)
- Professional wins: 67

Number of wins by tour
- LPGA Tour: 11
- Ladies European Tour: 6
- LPGA of Japan Tour: 32
- LPGA of Korea Tour: 21
- Ladies Asian Golf Tour: 1
- WPGA Tour of Australasia: 5

Best results in LPGA major championships (wins: 2)
- Chevron Championship: T5: 2010
- Women's PGA C'ship: 3rd/T3: 2009, 2010
- U.S. Women's Open: T2: 2023
- Women's British Open: Won: 2008, 2012
- Evian Championship: T44: 2013

Achievements and awards
- (For a full list of awards, see here)

Jiyai Shin (Korean: 신지애; RR: Sin Jiae; [ɕin dʑi.ɛː]; born 28 April 1988) is a South Korean professional golfer. She primarily plays on the LPGA of Japan Tour. Shin previously played primarily on the LPGA Tour and the LPGA of Korea Tour (KLPGA). She has broken existing KLPGA records, winning 10 events in 19 starts on the KLPGA Tour in 2007. In 2008, playing only 10 tournaments on the LPGA Tour as a non-member, she won three events, including the Women's British Open and the ADT Championship.

Shin has been ranked No. 1 in the Women's World Golf Rankings for 25 weeks and was the first Asian to be ranked No. 1. With 60+ wins worldwide on six different tours, she is the winningest Korean golfer, male or female, of all time.

== Early life and amateur career ==
In 2004, at the age 16, Shin's mother was killed in a car accident. Her younger brother and sister were seriously injured and spent nearly a year in a hospital. Her mother's life insurance money funded the beginning of her golf career.

In 2005, while she was still in high school, Shin was the only amateur to win a KLPGA event that season when she won the SK Enclean Invitational.

== Professional career ==
=== LPGA of Korea Tour ===
In 2005, Shin turned professional. Returning to the KLPGA as a rookie in 2006, she started her year with a pair of third-place finishes in her first two events and went on to claim three wins on the season.

2007 marked Shin's breakout year. She played 19 events on the KLPGA and won 10 of them, shattering all existing Tour records. She also ventured onto the LPGA Tour for the first time and played three of the four women's major championships. At the U.S. Women's Open she finished sixth. The next month at the Evian Masters, an event on the LPGA Tour and a major on the Ladies European Tour, she finished tied for third. Shin finished 2007 ranked 8th in the world, the highest ranked Korean of all, and the only non-LPGA member who ranked in the top ten.

Opening 2008 at the Women's World Cup of Golf, Shin and number two KLPGA player Eun-Hee Ji succumbed to the Philippines pair of Jennifer Rosales and Dorothy Delasin with a score of −16 after 3rd and final day of competition. Philippines scored −18 and received the $240,000 cheque.

Shin then played at the Women's Australian Open where she finished 2nd, losing to Karrie Webb in a playoff.

Shin won the Women's British Open in Berkshire, England for her first LPGA Tour and major win. This made her the first non-member of the LPGA Tour to win a major since Laura Davies won the U.S. Women's Open in 1987. She won the 2008 Mizuno Classic in November, shooting scores of 68, 66 and 67. She was six shots ahead of the next competitor to win at −15 (201), to notch her second LPGA career win. Two weeks later she won the ADT Championship, the culminating event in the season-long LPGA playoff series, and claimed the $1 million prize. She became the first-ever non-LPGA member to win three LPGA Tour tournaments.

=== LPGA Tour ===
Shin's wins in LPGA Tour events in 2008 qualified her for LPGA membership in 2009. She got off to a slow start as an LPGA member, missing her first cut ever in an LPGA Tour tournament at the season-opening SBS Open at Turtle Bay. She rebounded and won the third event of the season, the limited field HSBC Women's Champions, scoring 66 in both the third and fourth rounds. She won again in June at the full-field Wegmans LPGA tournament and in September at the P&G Beauty NW Arkansas Championship. By the first week of November she officially clinched the LPGA Rookie of the Year award.

On 2 May, Shin won the Cyber Agent Ladies on the LPGA of Japan Tour. On 3 May, she became the World Number 1 ranked women's golfer, replacing Lorena Ochoa who finished in sixth place in an LPGA Tour tournament the previous day. She held the position until it was taken over by Ai Miyazato on 21 June 2010 and regained it on 26 July after winning the Evian Masters.

On 19 September, Shin won the MetLife-Korea Economics KLPGA Championship, one of the major championships on the LPGA of Korea Tour. With this victory, Shin qualified for the KLPGA Hall of Fame, although she has to fulfill her career as professional golfer for 10 years before membership can be official. If she continues her professional career, she will be the third Hall of Famer in 2015, after Ok-Hee Ku and Se Ri Pak.

=== LPGA of Japan Tour ===
Shin gave up her LPGA Tour membership before the start of the season to be nearer to her family in Korea and played on the LPGA of Japan Tour, winning four times during the 2014 season.

Shin won the Cyber Agent Ladies in early May for the second time in her career. She birdied three of the final five holes on the back nine to win by one stroke over Erika Kikuchi of Japan. This victory is her 10th win on the JLPGA Tour.

== Awards and honors ==
- In 2005, Shin earned the KLPGA's Rookie of the Year award.
- In 2006, Shin won the KLPGA's money list.
- In 2007 and 2008, led the KLPGA's money list once more and also earned Player of the Year honors.
- In 2009, Shin earned the LPGA Tour Rookie of the Year. She also won the money list.
- In 2009, Shin was awarded a Talent Medal of Korea by the President of South Korea.
- In 2015, she entered the KLPGA's Hall of Fame.
- In 2018, she earned LPGA of Japan Tour's Player of the Year award.

== Personal life ==
Shin currently owns a home in Atlanta, Georgia, where she lives with her brother, stepmother, and father.

== Professional wins (67) ==
=== LPGA Tour wins (11) ===
Legend
Major championships (2)
Other LPGA Tour (9)

No.	Date	Tournament	Winning score	To par	Margin of victory	Runner(s)-up
1	3 Aug 2008	**Women's British Open**^{[1]}	66-68-70-66=270	−18	3 strokes	(Taiwan) Yani Tseng
2	9 Nov 2008	Mizuno Classic^{[2]}	68-66-67=201	−15	6 strokes	(Japan) Mayu Hattori
3	23 Nov 2008	ADT Championship	69-75-71-**70**		1 stroke	(Australia) Karrie Webb
4	8 Mar 2009	HSBC Women's Champions	72-73-66-66=277	−11	2 strokes	(Australia) Katherine Hull
5	28 Jun 2009	Wegmans LPGA	65-68-67-71=271	−17	7 strokes	(United States) Kristy McPherson (Taiwan) Yani Tseng
6	13 Sep 2009	P&G Beauty NW Arkansas Championship	70-70-64=207	−9	Playoff	(United States) Angela Stanford (South Korea) Sun Young Yoo
7	25 Jul 2010	Evian Masters^{[1]}	70-69-68-67=274	−14	1 stroke	(South Korea) Na Yeon Choi (United States) Morgan Pressel (United States) Alexis Thompson
8	7 Nov 2010	Mizuno Classic^{[2]}	65-66-67=198	−18	2 strokes	(Taiwan) Yani Tseng
9	10 Sep 2012	Kingsmill Championship	62-68-69-69=268	−16	Playoff	(United States) Paula Creamer
10	16 Sep 2012	**Ricoh Women's British Open**^{[1]}	71-64-71-73=279	−9	9 strokes	(South Korea) Inbee Park
11	17 Feb 2013	ISPS Handa Women's Australian Open^{[3]}	65-67-70-72=274	−18	2 strokes	(Taiwan) Yani Tseng

LPGA Tour playoff record (2–0)

No.	Year	Tournament	Opponent(s)	Result
1	2009	P&G Beauty NW Arkansas Championship	(United States) Angela Stanford (South Korea) Sun Young Yoo	Won with birdie on second extra hole
2	2012	Kingsmill Championship	(United States) Paula Creamer	Won with par on ninth extra hole

^{1} Co-sanctioned by the Ladies European Tour.
^{2} Co-sanctioned by the LPGA of Japan Tour.
^{3} Co-sanctioned by the ALPG Tour and the Ladies European Tour.

=== Ladies European Tour wins (6) ===
No.	Date	Tournament	Winning score	To par	Margin of victory	Runner-up
1	3 Aug 2008	**Women's British Open**^{[4]}	66-68-70-66=270	−18	3 strokes	(Taiwan) Yani Tseng
2	25 Jul 2010	**Evian Masters**^{[4]}	70-69-68-67=274	−14	1 stroke	(South Korea) Na Yeon Choi (United States) Morgan Pressel (United States) Alexis Thompson
3	16 Sep 2012	**Ricoh Women's British Open**^{[4]}	71-64-71-73=279	−9	9 strokes	(South Korea) Inbee Park
4	17 Feb 2013	ISPS Handa Women's Australian Open^{[5]}	65-67-70-72=274	−18	2 strokes	(Taiwan) Yani Tseng
5	28 Feb 2016	RACV Ladies Masters^{[6]}	68-70-71-69=278	−14	3 strokes	(England) Holly Clyburn
6	11 Feb 2018	ActewAGL Canberra Classic ^{[6]}	65-68-64=197	−19	6 strokes	(Australia) Minjee Lee

^{4} Co-sanctioned by the LPGA Tour.
^{5} Co-sanctioned by the ALPG Tour and the LPGA Tour.
^{6} Co-sanctioned by the ALPG Tour.
Tournaments in bold denotes major tournaments in LET.

=== LPGA of Japan Tour wins (32) ===
No.	Date	Tournament	Winning score	To par	Margin of victory	Runner(s)-up
1	23 Mar 2008	Yokohama Tire PRGR Ladies Cup	70-69-73=212	−4	Playoff	(Japan) Sakura Yokomine
2	9 Nov 2008	Mizuno Classic^{[7]}	68-66-67=201	−15	6 strokes	(Japan) Mayu Hattori
3	25 Oct 2009	Masters GC Ladies	70-70-68-208	−8	Playoff	(Japan) Yuko Mitsuka (Japan) Akiko Fukushima
4	2 May 2010	Cyber Agent Ladies	72-70-66=208	−8	2 strokes	(Japan) Akane Iijima (Japan) Miho Koga
5	7 Nov 2010	Mizuno Classic^{[7]}	65-66-67=198	−18	2 strokes	(Taiwan) Yani Tseng
6	22 Jun 2014	Nichirei Ladies	69-65-70=204	−12	4 strokes	(Japan) Hikari Fujita (Japan) Rumi Yoshiba
7	10 Aug 2014	Meiji Cup	70-66-68=204	−12	2 strokes	(Taiwan) Teresa Lu
8	31 Aug 2014	Nitori Ladies Golf Tournament	67-71-70=208	−8	3 strokes	(Japan) Saiki Fujita (South Korea) Lee Bo-mee
9	21 Sep 2014	Munsingwear Ladies Tokai Classic	68-67-67=202	−14	1 stroke	(South Korea) Lee Na-ri
10	3 May 2015	Cyber Agent Ladies	68-71-69=208	−8	1 stroke	(Japan) Erika Kikuchi
11	21 Jun 2015	Nichirei Ladies	71-67-67=205	−11	1 stroke	(South Korea) Lee Ji-hee
12	29 Nov 2015	**Japan LPGA Tour Championship Ricoh Cup**	70-71-72-68=281	−7	6 strokes	(Japan) Shiho Oyama
13	15 May 2016	Hoken No Madoguchi Ladies	71-67-68=206	−10	2 strokes	(South Korea) Kim Ha-neul (South Korea) Lee Bo-mee
14	19 Jun 2016	Nichirei Ladies	67-69-68=204	−12	3 strokes	(Japan) Minami Katsu (a)
15	30 Oct 2016	Hisako Higuchi Mitsubishi Electric Ladies Golf Tournament	69-72-66=207	−9	1 stroke	(South Korea) Lee Ji-hee
16	25 Aug 2017	Nitori Ladies Golf Tournament	69-65-70-74=278	−10	2 strokes	(Taiwan) Babe Liu
17	19 Nov 2017	Daio Paper Elleair Ladies Open	70-66-68-67=271	−17	2 strokes	(Japan) Ai Suzuki
18	6 May 2018	**World Ladies Championship Salonpas Cup**	74-71-70-70=285	−3	1 stroke	(Japan) Ai Suzuki
19	2 Sep 2018	Golf5 Ladies	64-68-70=202	−14	Playoff	(Japan) Sakura Koiwai
20	9 Sep 2018	**Japan LPGA Championship Konica Minolta Cup**	67-66-71-68=272	−16	9 strokes	(South Korea) Ahn Sun-ju (South Korea) Chung Jae-eun
21	25 Nov 2018	**Japan LPGA Tour Championship Ricoh Cup**	66-73-70-68=277	−11	Playoff	(South Korea) Bae Hee-kyung
22	14 Apr 2019	Studio Alice Women's Open	68-70-69=207	−9	1 stroke	(Japan) Erika Kikuchi (Japan) Saki Takeo
23	28 Apr 2019	Fujisankei Ladies Classic	70-72-63=205	−8	2 strokes	(Japan) Hinako Shibuno (Japan) Ai Suzuki (Japan) Hikaru Yoshimoto
24	30 Jun 2019	Earth Mondahmin Cup	67-66-68-72=273	−15	3 strokes	(Japan) Erika Hara (Japan) Mika Miyazato
25	18 Oct 2020	Fujitsu Ladies Golf Tournament	70-70-69=209	−7	2 strokes	(South Korea) Bae Seon-woo (Japan) Ayaka Furue
26	8 Nov 2020	Toto Japan Classic	66-65-66=197	−19	3 strokes	(Japan) Yuka Saso
27	20 Jun 2021	Nichirei Ladies	70-70-66=206	−10	Playoff	(South Korea) Jeon Mi-jeong
28	25 Jul 2021	Daito Kentaku Eheyanet Ladies	68-68-66-71=273	−15	5 strokes	(Japan) Mayu Hamada (South Korea) Jeon Mi-jeong (Japan) Reika Usui (Japan) Ayaka Watanabe
29	5 Mar 2023	Daikin Orchid Ladies Golf Tournament	73-69-65-71=278	−10	3 strokes	(Japan) Mone Inami (Japan) Momoko Ueda
30	25 Jun 2023	Earth Mondahmin Cup	68-65-74-68=275	−13	Playoff	(Japan) Akie Iwai
31	11 May 2025	**World Ladies Championship Salonpas Cup**	71-70-67-73=281	−7	Playoff	(Japan) Saiki Fujita
32	4 Oct 2026	**Japan Women's Open Golf Championship**	68-68-67-66=269	−11	Playoff	(Japan) Shiho Kuwaki

^{7} Co-sanctioned by the LPGA Tour.
Tournaments in bold denotes major tournaments in JLPGA.

=== LPGA of Korea Tour wins (21) ===
No.	Date	Tournament	Winning score	Margin of victory	Runner(s)-up
1	11 Sep 2005	SK Enclean Invitational (as an amateur)	−11 (68-67-70=205)	2 strokes	(South Korea) Kyeong Bae
2	21 May 2006	**Taeyoung Cup Korea Women's Open**	−11 (67-73-65=205)	2 strokes	(United States) Cristie Kerr
3	8 Sep 2006	PAVV Invitational	−12 (68-66-70=204)	1 stroke	(South Korea) Hye-Jin Jung
4	19 Nov 2006	Orient China Ladies Open	−17 (72-66-64-69=271)	8 strokes	(South Korea) Na Yeon Choi
5	27 Apr 2007	MBC Tour MCSquare Cup Crown CC Ladies Open	E (76-73-67=216)	Playoff	(South Korea) Joo-Eun Lee
6	3 Jun 2007	Hill State Open	−12 (67-71-66=204)	1 stroke	(South Korea) Eun-Hee Ji
7	15 Jun 2007	MBC Tour BC Card Classic	−12 (71-67-66=204)	1 stroke	(South Korea) Ji-Yeon Woo
8	23 Jun 2007	KB Star Tour 3rd Tournament at Pohang	−16 (66-68-66=200)	2 stroke	(South Korea) Eun-Hee Ji
9	8 Sep 2007	KB Star Tour 4th Tournament at Cheongwon	−10 (69-65=134)	2 strokes	(South Korea) Na Yeon Choi
10	16 Sep 2007	SK Energy Invitational	−12 (68-66-70=204)	5 strokes	(South Korea) Hee Young Park (South Korea) Jin Joo Hong
11	7 Oct 2007	Samsung Finance Ladies Championship	−8 (71-67-70=208)	2 strokes	(South Korea) Hyun Hee Moon
12	28 Oct 2007	Interburgo Masters	−9 (71-72-67=210)	5 strokes	(South Korea) Na Yeon Choi
13	25 Nov 2007	ADT CAPS Championship	−5 (74-69-68=211)	3 strokes	(South Korea) Seon-Wook Lim
14	16 Dec 2007	Orient China Ladies Open	−13 (68-68-67=203)	5 strokes	(Taiwan) Yani Tseng
15	20 Apr 2008	Woori Investment & Securities Ladies Championship	−13 (66-70-67=203)	1 stroke	(South Korea) Ilhee Lee
16	18 May 2008	**Taeyoung Cup Korea Women's Open**	−3 (75-69-69=213)	Playoff	(South Korea) So Yeon Ryu
17	15 Jun 2008	BC Card Classic	−5 (68-71-72=211)	Playoff	(South Korea) Min-Sun Kim (South Korea) Hyun-Ji Kim
18	26 Sep 2008	**Shinsegae KLPGA Championship**	−7 (67-70-72=209)	2 strokes	(South Korea) Sun Ju Ahn
19	18 Oct 2008	Hite Cup Championship	−13 (68-67-68=203)	2 strokes	(South Korea) Kang Soo-yun
20	26 Oct 2008	**KB Star Tour Grand Final at Incheon**	−3 (66-74-70-73=285)	Playoff	(South Korea) Sun Ju Ahn (South Korea) He-Yong Choi
21	19 Sep 2010	**J Golf Series MetLife-Korea Economic Daily KLPGA Championship**	−12 (66-72-68-70=276)	4 strokes	(South Korea) Kim Hye-youn

Tournaments in bold denotes major tournaments in KLPGA

=== Ladies Asian Golf Tour wins (1) ===
No.	Date	Tournament	Winning score	Margin of victory	Runner(s)-up
1	9 Feb 2007	Thailand Ladies Open	−10 (67-72-67=206)	10 strokes	(South Korea) Da-ye Na

=== WPGA Tour of Australasia wins (5) ===
No.	Date	Tournament	Winning score	To par	Margin of victory	Runner(s)-up
1	17 Feb 2013	ISPS Handa Women's Australian Open^{[8]}	65-67-70-72=274	−18	2 strokes	(Taiwan) Yani Tseng
2	28 Feb 2016	RACV Ladies Masters^{[9]}	68-70-71-69=278	−14	3 strokes	(England) Holly Clyburn
3	11 Feb 2018	ActewAGL Canberra Classic^{[9]}	65-68-64=197	−19	6 strokes	(Australia) Minjee Lee
2	12 Feb 2023	Women's Victorian Open	67-71-66-71=275	−14	5 strokes	(Australia) Grace Kim (Thailand) Pavarisa Yoktuan
5	1 Dec 2024	ISPS Handa Women's Australian Open	69-68-67-70=274	−17	2 strokes	(South Africa) Ashleigh Buhai

^{8} Co-sanctioned by the LPGA Tour and the Ladies European Tour.
^{9} Co-sanctioned by the Ladies European Tour.

== Major championships ==
=== Wins (2) ===
No.	Year	Championship	Winning score	Margin	Runner-up
1	2008	Women's British Open	−18 (66-68-70-66=270)	3 strokes	(Taiwan) Yani Tseng
2	2012	Ricoh Women's British Open	−9 (71-64-71-73=279)	9 strokes	(South Korea) Inbee Park

=== Results timeline ===
Results not in chronological order.

Tournament	2007	2008	2009	2010	2011	2012
Chevron Championship	T15	T31	T21	T5	T29	T26
U.S. Women's Open	6	T19	T13	T5	T10	
Women's PGA Championship			3	T3	T34	
Women's British Open	T28	1	T8	T14	21	1

Tournament	2013	2014	2015	2016	2017	2018	2019	2020	2021	2022	2023	2024	2025	2026
Chevron Championship	T7	T16					T21					T23		
U.S. Women's Open	CUT				CUT		CUT				T2	T39	CUT	T34
Women's PGA Championship	T5				T11							CUT		
The Evian Championship^	T44							NT			T54			
Women's British Open	T36	T29		T60							3	T2	CUT	CUT

^ The Evian Championship was added as a major in 2013.

Win
Top 10
Did not play

CUT = missed the half-way cut
NT = no tournament
"T" tied

=== Summary ===
Tournament	Wins	2nd	3rd	Top-5	Top-10	Top-25	Events	Cuts made
Chevron Championship	0	0	0	1	2	7	10	10
Women's PGA Championship	0	0	2	3	3	4	6	5
U.S. Women's Open	0	1	0	2	4	6	12	8
The Evian Championship	0	0	0	0	0	0	2	2
Women's British Open	2	1	1	4	5	7	13	11
Totals	2	2	3	10	14	24	43	36

- Most consecutive cuts made – 22 (2007 Kraft Nabisco – 2013 LPGA)
- Longest streak of top-10s – 4 (2009 British Open – 2010 U.S. Open)

== LPGA Tour career summary ==
Year	Tournaments played	Cuts made*	Wins	2nd	3rd	Top 10s	Best finish	Earnings (US$)	Money list rank	Scoring average	Scoring rank
2006	1	1	0	0	0	1	T4	63,719	n/a	70.33	n/a
2007	7	7	0	0	1	2	T3	346,259	n/a	71.76	n/a
2008	10	10	3	0	0	6	1	1,682,976	n/a	70.73	n/a
2009	25	23	3	1	3	12	1	1,807,334^{1}	1	70.26	2
2010	18	17	2	1	4	14	1	1,783,127	2	70.25	5
2011	18	18	0	2	0	7	2	720,735	15	70.81	4
2012	18	18	2	0	3	8	1	1,234,597	7	70.31	1
2013	20	19	1	0	0	5	1	602,875	22	70.66	9
2014	5	5	0	0	0	0	T16	n/a	n/a	72.47	n/a
2015	1	1	0	0	0	1	T6	n/a	n/a	68.00	n/a
2016	3	3	0	0	0	0	T14	n/a	n/a	71.55	n/a
2017	3	2	0	0	0	0	T11	n/a	n/a	70.56	n/a
2018	2	2	0	0	0	1	T7	n/a	n/a	70.00	n/a
2019	3	2	0	0	0	0	T21	n/a	n/a	72.22	n/a
2020	2	1	0	0	0	0	T48	n/a	n/a	72.83	n/a
2021	Did not play										
2022	1	1	0	0	0	0	T58	n/a	n/a	72.00	n/a
2023	5	5	0	1	1	4	T2	n/a	n/a	69.75	n/a
2024	8	7	0	1	0	2	T2	n/a	n/a	71.59	n/a
2025	3	0	0	0	0	1	T6	65,060	n/a	72.00	n/a

^{1} Shin's $24,349 earnings at the 2009 Honda LPGA Thailand were considered unofficial under LPGA rules and are not included in this total.
* Includes matchplay and other events without a cut.

- Official through 2025 season

== World ranking ==
Position in Women's World Golf Rankings at the end of each calendar year.

Year	Ranking	Source
2006	33	
2007	7	
2008	6	
2009	2	
2010	1	
2011	7	
2012	8	
2013	16	
2014	36	
2015	33	
2016	23	
2017	25	
2018	21	
2019	24	
2020	37	
2021	53	
2022	68	
2023	15	
2024	24	
2025	59	

== Team appearances ==
Professional

- Lexus Cup (representing Asia team): 2007 (winners)
- World Cup (representing South Korea): 2007, 2008
- The Queens (representing Korea): 2016 (captain, winners)

== See also ==
- List of golfers with most LPGA Tour wins
