= Momoko Ueda =

Japanese professional golfer (born 1986)

Momoko Ueda 上田 桃子
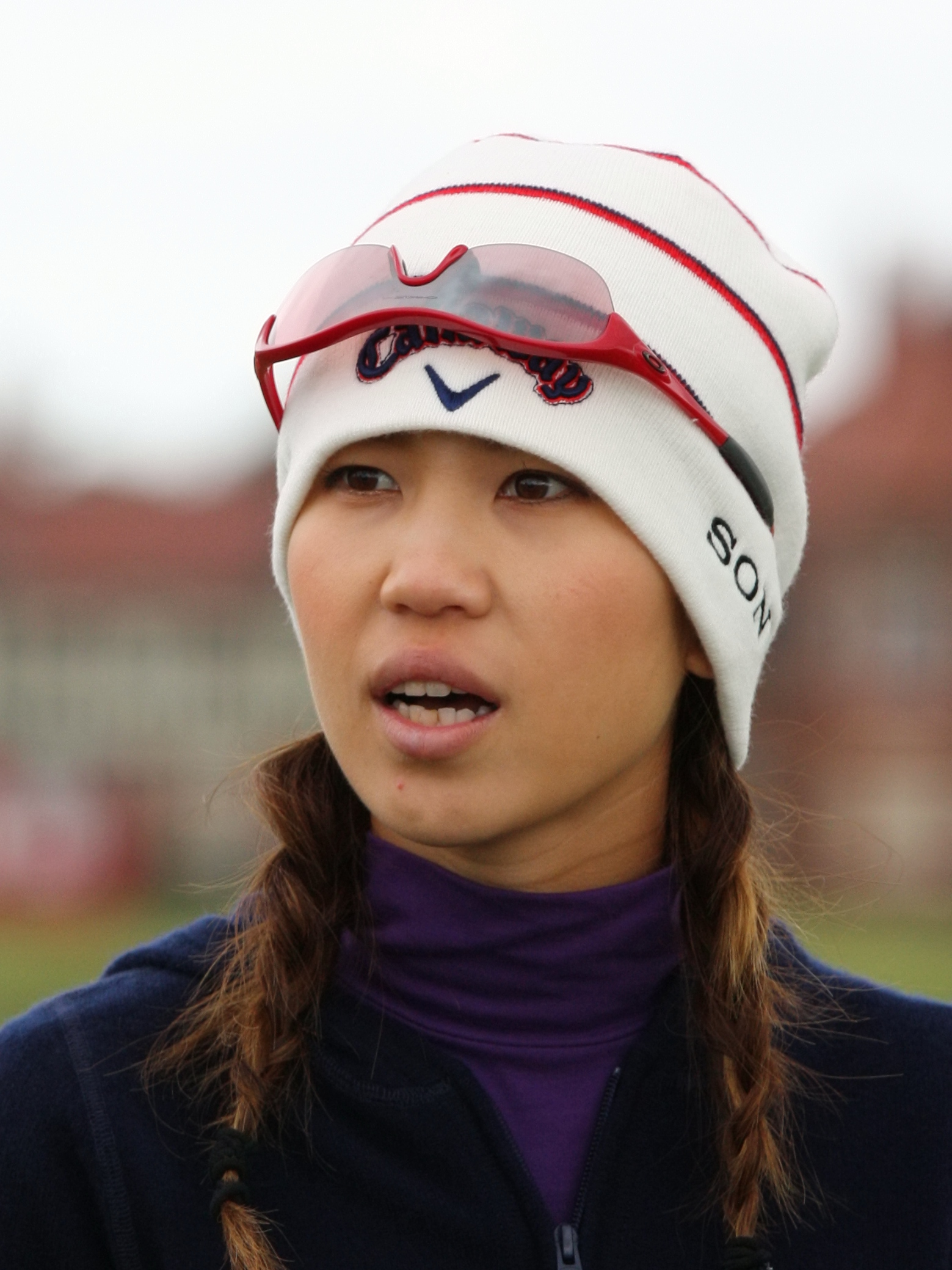
- Ueda before 2009 Women's British Open

Personal information
- Nationality: Japan
- Born: 15 June 1986 (age 40) Kumamoto, Japan
- Height: 5 ft 3.5 in (1.61 m)

Career
- Sport: Golf
- Turned professional: 2005
- Former tours: LPGA of Japan Tour (2005−2024); LPGA Tour (2008–2013)
- Professional wins: 17

Number of wins by tour
- LPGA Tour: 2
- LPGA of Japan Tour: 17

Best results in LPGA major championships
- Chevron Championship: T27: 2010
- Women's PGA C'ship: T25: 2008
- U.S. Women's Open: T13: 2008
- Women's British Open: 6th: 2020
- Evian Championship: T27: 2013

Achievements and awards
- LPGA of Japan Tour Player of the Year: 2007
- LPGA of Japan Tour leading money winner: 2007
- LPGA of Japan Tour Rookie of the Year: 2007

Momoko Ueda (上田 桃子, Ueda Momoko; born 15 June 1986) is a Japanese female professional golfer who in 2007 at the age of 21 became the youngest player in the history of the LPGA of Japan Tour (JLPGA) to finish first on the money list. She also played on the United States–based LPGA Tour for six years.

== Amateur career ==
Ueda was born in Kumamoto, Japan. She started playing golf at the age of nine, and entered the prestigious Sakata School at ten. In twenty three amateur events, she placed in the top 10 fifteen times, including three wins, and five second-place finishes.

== Professional career ==
Ueda turned pro in August 2005 and won the JLPGA rookies cup that year. In 2006, she placed 4th in two JLPGA events, and tied for 9th in the Mizuno Classic, a joint JLPGA and LPGA event.

2007 was her breakout year on the JLPGA, with five wins, six runners-up, a 3rd and a 5th. Internationally, she represented Japan in the World Cup, and played in the Women's British Open at St Andrews. In April she won the Life Card Ladies at her home town of Kumamoto. She went on to win the Resort Trust Ladies and the Stanley Ladies, and placed 2nd in the Fujitsu Ladies, before winning the Mizuno Classic in November. A highlight of her tournament was a double-eagle during the tournament's final round. She became the tournament's first Japanese winner in nine years and only the 16th non-LPGA member in history to win an LPGA event. Two weeks later at the Elleair Ladies she won her fifth tournament and became the youngest money title winner in the history of the JLPGA tour.

Her win at Mizuno qualified her to play on the LPGA tour in 2008. In her first tournament of the year, the SBS Open at Turtle Bay, she finished fifth.

Ueda again won the Mizuno Classic in 2011. She birdied the 3rd hole of a sudden death playoff to defeat Shanshan Feng.

At the conclusion of the second round of the 2024 Daio Paper Elleair Ladies Open on 15 November 2024, Ueda retired from the JLPGA Tour.

== Professional wins (17) ==
=== LPGA of Japan Tour wins (17) ===
| No. | Date | Tournament | Winning score | To par | Margin of victory | Runner(s)-up |
|---|---|---|---|---|---|---|
| 1 | 15 Apr 2007 | Life Card Ladies | 70-71-70=211 | −5 | 6 strokes | (Japan) Erina Hara |
| 2 | 3 Jun 2007 | Resort Trust Ladies | 69-68-68=205 | –11 | Playoff | (Japan) Yuri Fudoh |
| 3 | 15 July 2007 | Stanley Ladies Golf Tournament | 71-35=106 | –2 | Playoff | (Japan) Chie Arimura (Japan) Sakura Yokomine |
| 4 | 4 Nov 2007 | Mizuno Classic^{a} | 70-67-66=203 | –13 | 2 strokes | (Sweden) Maria Hjorth (United States) Reilley Rankin |
| 5 | 18 Nov 2007 | Daio Paper Elleair Ladies Open | 66-71-72=209 | –7 | 3 strokes | (Japan) Erina Hara (Japan) Yui Kawahara (Japan) Shinobu Moromizato (Japan) Mikiyo Nishizuka |
| 6 | 15 Jun 2008 | Suntory Ladies Open | 70-69-70-72=281 | –7 | 1 stroke | (South Korea) Lim Eun-a (South Korea) Song Bo-bae |
| 7 | 28 Sep 2008 | Miyagi TV Cup Dunlop Women's Open | 70-72-69=211 | –5 | 1 stroke | (Japan) Akane Iijima (Taiwan) Julie Lu (Japan) Yuko Mitsuka |
| 8 | 9 Aug 2009 | AXA Ladies | 68-69-68=205 | –11 | Playoff | (Japan) Chie Arimura (South Korea) Lee Ji-hee |
| 9 | 6 Nov 2011 | Mizuno Classic^{a} | 67-64-69=200 | –16 | Playoff | (China) Shanshan Feng |
| 10 | 24 Aug 2014 | CAT Ladies | 70-71-69=210 | –9 | 1 stroke | (Japan) Rikako Morita |
| 11 | 2 Nov 2014 | Hisako Higuchi – Morinaga Ladies | 68-69-69=206 | –10 | 1 stroke | (Japan) Junko Omote |
| 12 | 21 May 2017 | Chukyo TV Bridgestone Ladies Open | 66-69-65=200 | –16 | 2 strokes | (Taiwan) Teresa Lu |
| 13 | 22 Oct 2017 | Nobuta Group Masters GC Ladies | 73-65-67=205 | –11 | 2 strokes | (Japan) Asako Fujimoto (Japan) Nasa Hataoka (South Korea) Jiyai Shin |
| 14 | 24 Mar 2019 | T-Point ENEOS Golf Tournament | 69-69-69=207 | –6 | 2 strokes | (Japan) Minami Katsu (South Korea) Jiyai Shin |
| 15 | 9 Jun 2019 | Yonex Ladies Golf Tournament | 70-68-65=203 | –13 | 6 strokes | (Japan) Yuki Ichinose (South Korea) Kim Hyo-joo (Japan) Rumi Yoshiba |
| 16 | 2 May 2021 | Panasonic Open Ladies Golf Tournament | 70-68-73=202 | –5 | Playoff | (Japan) Momoko Osato |
| 17 | 10 Apr 2022 | Fujifilm Studio Alice Ladies Open | 69-69-69=207 | –9 | 3 strokes | (Japan) Eri Fukuyama (Japan) Mone Inami (Japan) Seira Oki (Japan) Mao Saigo |

^{a} Co-sanctioned by the LPGA Tour.

=== LPGA Tour wins (2) ===
Legend
Major championships (0)
Other LPGA Tour (2)

| No. | Date | Tournament | Winning score | To par | Margin of victory | Runner(s)-up |
|---|---|---|---|---|---|---|
| 1 | 4 Nov 2007 | Mizuno Classic^{a} | 70-67-66=203 | –13 | 2 strokes | (Sweden) Maria Hjorth (United States) Reilley Rankin |
| 2 | 6 Nov 2011 | Mizuno Classic^{a} | 67-64-69=200 | –16 | Playoff | (China) Shanshan Feng |

^{a} Co-sanctioned by the LPGA of Japan Tour.

LPGA Tour playoff record (1–0)

| No. | Year | Tournament | Opponent | Result |
|---|---|---|---|---|
| 1 | 2011 | Mizuno Classic | (China) Shanshan Feng | Won with birdie on third extra hole |

== Results in LPGA majors ==
| Tournament | 2008 | 2009 | 2010 | 2011 | 2012 | 2013 | 2014 | 2015 | 2016 | 2017 | 2018 | 2019 | 2020 | 2021 | 2022 | 2023 |
|---|---|---|---|---|---|---|---|---|---|---|---|---|---|---|---|---|
| Chevron Championship | T47 | T30 | T27 | T33 | T66 | T41 | | | | | | | | | | |
| Women's PGA Championship | T25 | T57 | CUT | T30 | CUT | CUT | | | | | | | | | | |
| U.S. Women's Open | T13 | T40 | CUT | CUT | CUT | CUT | | | | | | | CUT | | CUT | CUT |
| The Evian Championship ^ | | | | | | T27 | | | | | | | NT | | | |
| Women's British Open | T7 | T55 | T9 | T22 | CUT | CUT | | | CUT | | | T51 | 6 | | | |

^ The Evian Championship was added as a major in 2013.

Top 10
Did not play

CUT = missed the half-way cut
NT = no tournament
"T" = tied

== LPGA Tour career summary ==
| Year | Events played | Cuts made | Wins | 2nds | 3rds | Top 10s | Best finish | Earnings ($) | Rank | Scoring average | Scoring rank |
|---|---|---|---|---|---|---|---|---|---|---|---|
| 2006 | 1 | 1 | 0 | 0 | 0 | 1 | T9 | 24,442 | n/a | 69.67 | n/a |
| 2007 | 4 | 4 | 1 | 0 | 0 | 2 | 1 | 302,550 | n/a | 72.07 | n/a |
| 2008 | 19 | 16 | 0 | 0 | 0 | 3 | 5 | 413,592 | 45 | 71.74 | 23 |
| 2009 | 18 | 15 | 0 | 1 | 0 | 2 | T2 | 416,333 | 33 | 71.68 | 28 |
| 2010 | 9 | 7 | 0 | 0 | 0 | 1 | T6 | 114,509 | 45 | 71.81 | 31 |
| 2011 | 16 | 13 | 1 | 0 | 0 | 1 | 1 | 333,494 | 34 | 72.19 | 31 |
| 2012 | 19 | 14 | 0 | 0 | 0 | 0 | T12 | 210,197 | 58 | 71.85 | 33 |
| 2013 | 17 | 12 | 0 | 0 | 0 | 0 | T27 | 83,283 | 88 | 72.66 | 76 |

- Official as of the 2013 season

== JLPGA prize money ==
| Year | Earnings (¥) | Rank |
|---|---|---|
| 2005 | 0 | – |
| 2006 | 46,751,163 | 13 |
| 2007 | 166,112,232 | 1 |
| 2008 | 54,617,651 | 17 |
| 2009 | 42,380,260 | 21 |
| 2010 | 21,771,999 | 39 |
| 2011 | 35,710,800 | 22 |
| 2012 | 6,383,200 | 80 |
| 2013 | 19,256,000 | 48 |
| 2014 | 74,315,585 | 10 |
| 2015 | 88,731,118 | 7 |
| 2016 | 31,085,815 | 35 |
| 2017 | 101,820,977 | 6 |
| 2018 | 49,337,685 | 21 |
| 2019 | 81,089,991 | 9 |
| 2020–21* | 57,140,302 | 13 |
| Total* | 876,504,778 | 9 |

* As of 13 June 2021

== Team appearances ==
Professional

- World Cup (representing Japan): 2007
- The Queens (representing Japan): 2015 (winners), 2017 (winners)
