= Minami Katsu =

Japanese professional golfer (born 1998)

Minami Katsu 勝みなみ
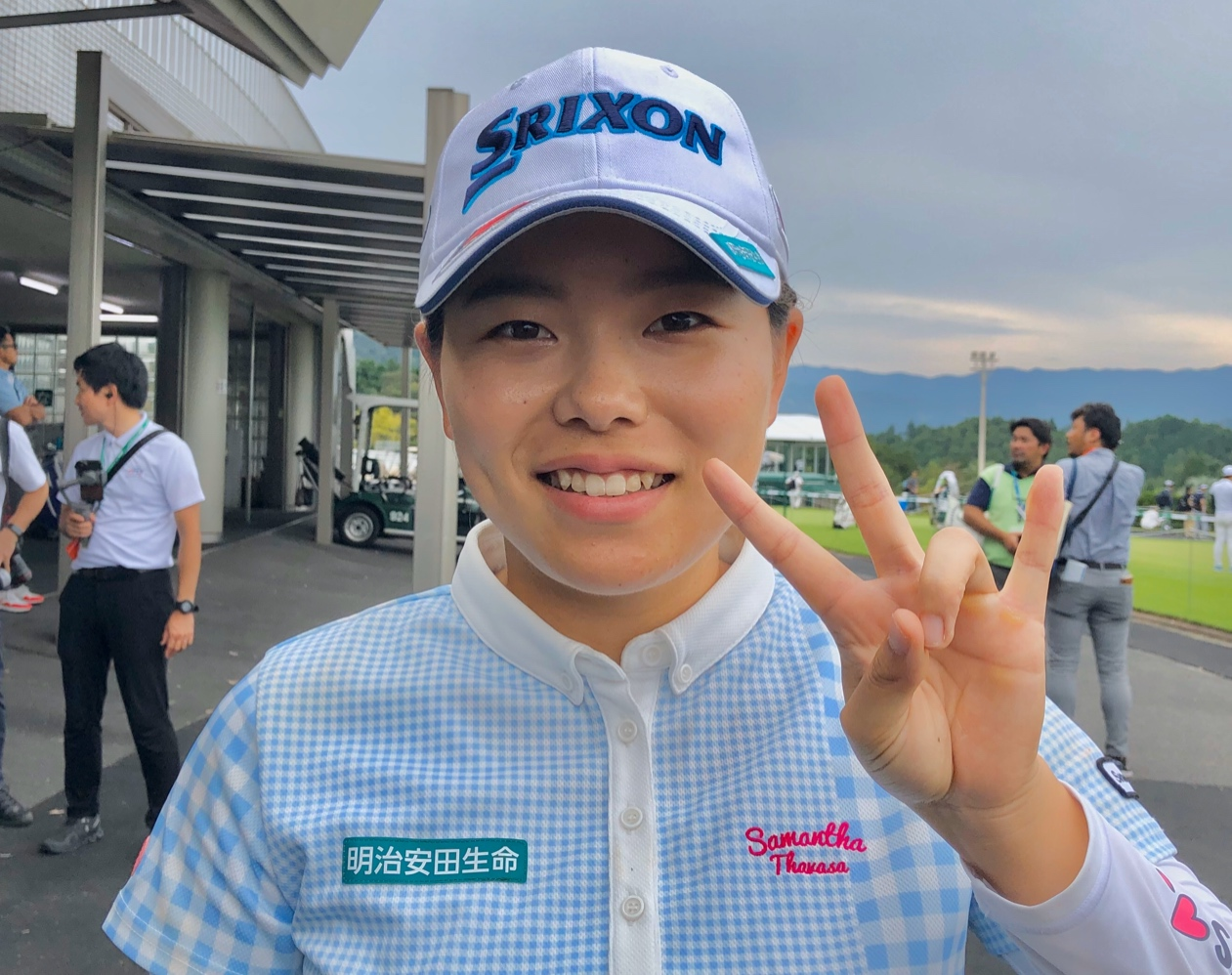
- Katsu in 2019

Personal information
- Nationality: Japan
- Born: 1 July 1998 (age 28) Kagoshima City, Kagoshima Prefecture, Japan
- Height: 1.59 m (5 ft 3 in)

Career
- Sport: Golf
- Turned professional: 2017
- Current tours: LPGA of Japan Tour; LPGA Tour
- Professional wins: 8

Number of wins by tour
- LPGA of Japan Tour: 8

Best results in LPGA major championships
- Chevron Championship: T9: 2024
- Women's PGA C'ship: T36: 2025
- U.S. Women's Open: T22: 2019
- Women's British Open: T2: 2025
- Evian Championship: T26: 2026

Minami Katsu (Japanese: 勝みなみ, born 1 July 1998) is a Japanese professional golfer. She is the youngest winner in the history of the LPGA of Japan Tour when she won the KKT Cup Vantelin Ladies Open as an amateur on 20 April 2014 at age 15.

== Early life ==
Katsu was born in Kagoshima City in 1998. She began to play golf at the age of six under her grandfather's influence. She graduated from Kagoshima Municipal Nagata Junior High School in 2014 and from Kagoshima High School in 2017.

== Amateur wins ==
- 2014 New Zealand Women's Stroke Play Championship, Japan Junior Golf Championship (girl's aged 15–17 division)
- 2015 Japan Women's Amateur

== Professional career ==
Katsu has eight wins on the LPGA of Japan Tour, including one as an amateur.

Katsu earned her LPGA Tour card for the 2023 season via Q-School.

In 2025, Katsu had an unofficial shared LPGA Tour win with Sarah Schmelzel at the Walmart NW Arkansas Championship when the tournament was shortened to only 18 holes due to heavy rainfall causing the course to be unplayable. Katsu and Schmelzel shot 8-under 63 during the tournament's only round.

== Professional wins (8) ==
=== LPGA of Japan Tour wins (8) ===
No.	Date	Tournament	Winning score	To par	Margin of victory	Runner(s)-up
1	20 Apr 2014	KKT Cup Vantelin Ladies Open**^{a}**	66-71-68=205	−11	1 stroke	(South Korea) Lee Bo-mee
2	18 Nov 2018	Daio Paper Elleair Ladies Open	71-68-64-65=268	−20	4 strokes	(Japan) Erika Kikuchi
3	5 May 2019	Panasonic Open Ladies Golf Tournament	69-68-67=204	−12	Playoff	(South Korea) Jeon Mi-jeong
4	26 May 2019	Chukyo TV Bridgestone Ladies Open	68-62-72=202	−14	2 strokes	(Japan) Yui Kawamoto
5	30 May 2021	Resort Trust Ladies	69-70-69-71=279	−9	3 strokes	(Japan) Mamiko Higa (Japan) Momoko Osato (Japan) Momo Yoshikawa
6	3 Oct 2021	**Japan Women's Open Golf Championship**	68-67-69-66=270	−14	6 strokes	(Japan) Mao Saigo (Japan) Momoko Ueda
7	31 Jul 2022	Rakuten Super Ladies	65-66-64-71=266	−22	5 strokes	(Japan) Mone Inami
8	2 Oct 2022	**Japan Women's Open Golf Championship**	72-75-70-68=285	−3	1 stroke	(South Korea) Jiyai Shin

^{a} Katsu won the 2014 KKT Cup Vantelin Ladies Open as an amateur.
Tournaments in bold denotes major tournaments in LPGA of Japan Tour.

== Playoff record ==
LPGA Tour playoff record (0–1)

No.	Year	Tournament	Opponent(s)	Result
1	2025	Buick LPGA Shanghai	(Thailand) Atthaya Thitikul	Lost to birdie on fifth extra hole

== Results in LPGA majors ==
Results not in chronological order.

Tournament	2019	2020	2021	2022	2023	2024	2025	2026
Chevron Championship					CUT	T9	T62	T12
U.S. Women's Open	T22	CUT	CUT		T71		CUT	CUT
Women's PGA Championship					53	T41	T36	T42
The Evian Championship		NT				T63	T68	T26
Women's British Open	T35	CUT		CUT	T21	CUT	T2	T12

Top 10
Did not play

CUT = missed the half-way cut
NT = no tournament
T = tied

=== Summary ===
Tournament	Wins	2nd	3rd	Top-5	Top-10	Top-25	Events	Cuts made
Chevron Championship	0	0	0	0	1	2	4	3
U.S. Women's Open	0	0	0	0	0	1	6	2
Women's PGA Championship	0	0	0	0	0	0	4	4
The Evian Championship	0	0	0	0	0	0	3	3
Women's British Open	0	1	0	1	1	3	7	4
Totals	0	1	0	1	2	6	24	16

- Most consecutive cuts made – 6 (2023 U.S. Women's Open – 2024 Evian)
- Longest streak of top-10s – 1 (twice)

== Team appearances ==
Amateur

- Espirito Santo Trophy (representing Japan): 2014
