= Maybank Championship (LPGA) =

Golf tournament

Tournament information
- Location: Kuala Lumpur, Malaysia
- Established: 2023
- Course: Kuala Lumpur Golf & Country Club
- Par: 72
- Length: 6,246 yards (5,711 m)
- Tour: LPGA Tour
- Format: Stroke play – 72 holes
- Prize fund: $3.0 million
- Month played: October

Tournament record score
- Aggregate: 265 Yin Ruoning (2024)
- To par: −23 as above

Current champion
- (Japan) Miyū Yamashita

The Maybank Championship is a women's professional golf tournament in Malaysia on the LPGA Tour. It debuted in October 2023 at the Kuala Lumpur Golf & Country Club in Kuala Lumpur.

Céline Boutier won the inaugural event on the 9th hole of a sudden-death playoff over Atthaya Thitikul.

== Winners ==
Year	Date	Champion	Country	Winning score	To par	Margin of victory	Purse ($)	Winner's share ($)
2021	1 Nov	Miyū Yamashita (2)	Japan	65-66-67-68=266	−22	2 strokes	3,000,000	450,000
2025	2 Nov	Miyū Yamashita	Japan	66-70-69-65=270	−18	Playoff	3,000,000	450,000
2024	27 Oct	Yin Ruoning	China	67-67-66-65=265	−23	1 stroke	3,000,000	450,000
2023	29 Oct	Céline Boutier	France	70-64-69-64=267	−21	Playoff	3,000,000	450,000

== Tournament records ==
Year	Player	Score	Round
2023	Atthaya Thitikul	62 (−10)	3rd
