= Erika Hara =

Japanese professional golfer (born 1999)

- Hara in 2026

Personal information
- Nationality: Japan
- Born: 15 February 1999 (age 27) Yokohama, Japan
- Height: 173 cm (5 ft 8 in)

Career
- Sport: Golf
- Turned professional: 2018
- Current tour: LPGA Tour
- Former tours: LPGA of Japan Tour; Epson Tour
- Professional wins: 8

Number of wins by tour
- LPGA of Japan Tour: 5
- Epson Tour: 1
- Other: 2

Best results in LPGA major championships
- Chevron Championship: T38: 2026
- Women's PGA C'ship: CUT: 2026
- U.S. Women's Open: CUT: 2020
- Women's British Open: CUT: 2021, 2026
- Evian Championship: 14th: 2026

Achievements and awards
- LPGA Tour Rookie of the Year: 2026

Erika Hara (原 英莉花, Hara Erika; born 15 February 1999) is a Japanese professional golfer. Among her tournament victories are the 2020 Japan LPGA Tour Championship and both the 2020 and 2023 editions of the Japan Women's Open Golf Championship.

== Early life and education ==
Hara was born 15 February 1999 in Yokohama. She began playing golf at age 10, and won the Kanagawa Prefecture Junior Championship in her first year of high school. While in high school, Hara met professional golfer Masashi Ozaki through an acquaintance and became his student. She graduated from Shonan Gakuin High School in 2016.

== Career ==
Hara passed the professional test and joined the professional ranks in 2018. She signed a sponsorship deal with logistics company Nippon Express in March of that year. She won two tournaments on the Japan StepUp Tour in 2018. Her first LPGA of Japan Tour victory came at the 2019 Resort Trust Ladies tournament, where she defeated Bae Seon-Woo in a playoff on the final day.

The following year, Hara won the 2020 Japan Women's Open Golf Championship, her first major win. In her next major tournament appearance, Hara won the 2020 Japan LPGA Tour Championship Ricoh Cup, topping the leaderboard on each day of the event and becoming the youngest winner in the tournament's history. Hara's overall position in the Women's World Golf Rankings qualified her for the U.S. Women's Open for the first time. Sitting at 19-over-par after the first two rounds of the 2020 U.S. Women's Open, Hara missed the cut. Hara also competed in the 2021 Women's British Open, marking her first appearance in that tournament, but missed the cut after hitting consecutive double-bogeys on the final two holes of the second round. Her final tournament win of the combined 2020–21 JLPGA season came at the 2021 Daio Paper Elleair Ladies Open, where she secured the final-day lead with an eagle on the 17th hole.

In 2022, a back injury interfered with Hara's play, but on the advice of her mentor Masashi Ozaki she attempted to adjust her swing and play through the pain. She underwent surgery to resolve the issue in May of the following year. Five months later, Hara captured her second Japan Women's Open Golf Championship title. Shortly after the Open win, Hara attempted to qualify for the 2024 LPGA Tour in an event played at the Plantation Golf and Country Club in Florida, but submitted an incorrect scorecard for her third round of play and was disqualified from the tournament.

For her first tournament appearance of 2024, Hara received a sponsor's exemption to enter the 2024 Honda LPGA Thailand. She finished the LPGA Tour event tied for 16th place with Yuka Saso. Hara also received a sponsor's exemption for the 2024 Women's Scottish Open. She chose to withdraw on short notice from her scheduled JLPGA event, the CAT Ladies tournament in Hakone, in order to participate in the LPGA Tour event. Hara had difficulty adjusting to the conditions at Dundonald Links, and failed to make the cut. The following week, Hara marked her first appearance on the LPGA of Korea Tour with a tie for 31st place in the Hanwha Classic, a KLPGA major tournament.

In 2025, Hara played on the Epson Tour. She won her event on that tour in August at the Wildhorse Ladies Golf Classic. She ultimately finished 5th in the Epson Tour rankings to graduate to the LPGA Tour for 2026.

== Image ==
According to Women's Wear Daily Japan, Hara has a reputation as a fashion leader in the golf world, and a track record of driving sales for golfwear company TSI Holdings, with whom she has a long-standing relationship. Her first commercial television advertisement, for sponsor Nippon Express, began airing in 2019. She has also featured in a television advertisement for TSI Holdings and its flagship apparel brand Pearly Gates. Since 2022, Hara has been a JLPGA Brightener, part of a select group of tour players who engage in additional public relations and promotional activity on behalf of the JLPGA.

== Professional wins (8) ==
=== LPGA of Japan Tour wins (5) ===
No.	Date	Tournament	Winning score	To par	Margin of victory	Runner-up
1	2 Jun 2019	Resort Trust Ladies	66-70-66=202	−14	Playoff	(South Korea) Bae Seon-woo
2	4 Oct 2020	**Japan Women's Open Golf Championship**	68-70-66-68=272	−16	4 strokes	(Japan) Sakura Koiwai
3	29 Nov 2020	**Japan LPGA Tour Championship Ricoh Cup**	67-68-71-72=278	−10	2 strokes	(Japan) Ayaka Furue
4	21 Nov 2021	Daio Paper Elleair Ladies Open	64-69-66-68=267	−17	3 strokes	(Japan) Mami Fukuda (Japan) Asuka Kashiwabara (Japan) Ai Suzuki
5	1 Oct 2023	**Japan Women's Open Golf Championship**	68-69-68-68=273	−15	3 strokes	(Japan) Erika Kikuchi

Tournaments in bold denotes major tournaments in LPGA of Japan Tour.

=== Epson Tour wins (1) ===
- 2025 Wildhorse Ladies Golf Classic

=== Japan StepUp Tour (2) ===
- 2018 RA.Shin.K･Ningineer RKB Ladies, Nichiiko Ladies Open
