= Miyū Yamashita =

Japanese professional golfer (born 2001)

Miyū Yamashita 山下 美夢有
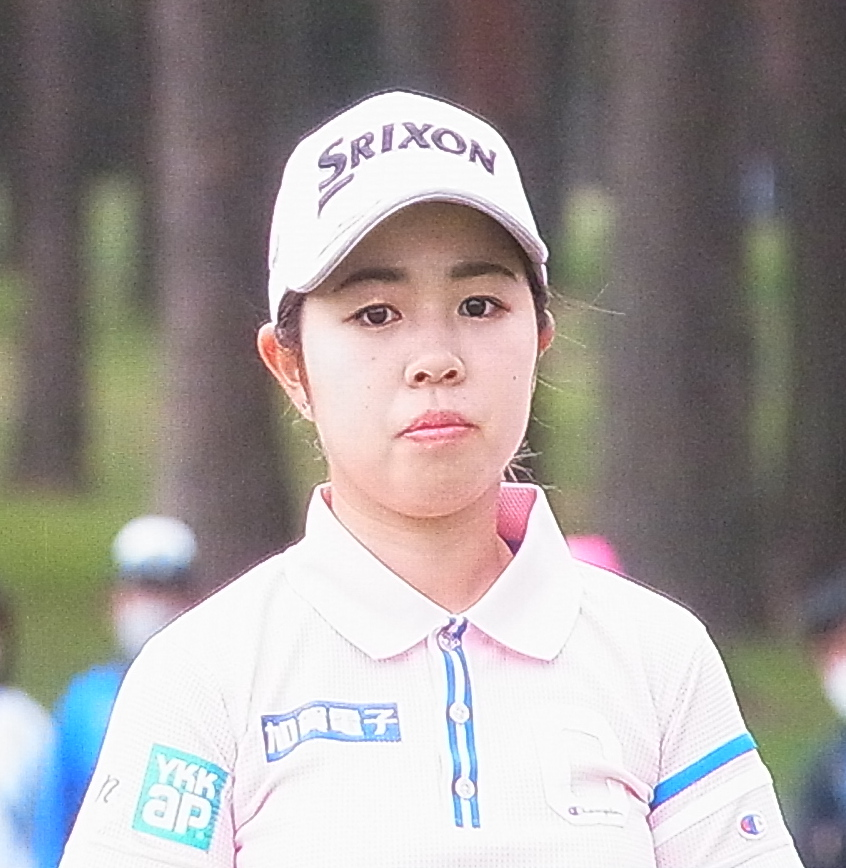
- Yamashita at the 2022 World Ladies Championship Salonpas Cup

Personal information
- Nationality: Japan
- Born: 2 August 2001 (age 25) Neyagawa, Osaka Prefecture, Japan
- Height: 150 cm (4 ft 11 in)

Career
- Sport: Golf
- Turned professional: 2020
- Current tours: LPGA of Japan Tour; LPGA Tour
- Professional wins: 20

Number of wins by tour
- LPGA Tour: 5
- Ladies European Tour: 2
- LPGA of Japan Tour: 14

Best results in LPGA major championships
- Chevron Championship: T17: 2024
- Women's PGA C'ship: T2: 2024
- U.S. Women's Open: T12: 2024
- Women's British Open: Won: 2025
- Evian Championship: T4: 2026

Achievements and awards
- LPGA of Japan Tour Player of the Year: 2022, 2023
- LPGA of Japan Tour leading money winner: 2022, 2023
- LPGA Tour Rookie of the Year: 2025
- LPGA Vare Trophy: 2026

Miyū Yamashita (山下 美夢有, Yamashita Miyū) (born 2 August 2001) is a Japanese professional golfer. She plays on the LPGA of Japan Tour where she has 14 wins and the LPGA Tour. She won the 2025 AIG Women's Open by two strokes over Charley Hull and Minami Katsu. This is her first major victory and first win outside Japan.

== Career ==
Yamashita was born in Neyagawa, Osaka in 2001 and started playing golf when she was five years old. She turned professional and joined the LPGA of Japan Tour in 2020.

She captured the 2021 KKT Cup Vantelin Ladies Open for her maiden win on the JLPGA.

In 2022, Yamashita recorded five wins and was the LPGA of Japan Tour leading money winner with ¥235,020,967. She also won the Mercedes Ranking (youngest ever) and had the lowest scoring average, finished most often (21 times) inside the top-10.

In December 2024, Yamashita earned her LPGA Tour card for 2025 by winning the LPGA Final Qualifying Tournament. She won the LPGA Tour Rookie of the Year.

== Professional wins (20) ==
=== LPGA Tour wins (5) ===
Legend
Major championships (1)
Other LPGA Tour (4)

No.	Date	Tournament	Winning score	To par to	Margin of victory	Runner(s)-up
1	3 Aug 2025	**AIG Women's Open**^{[1]}	68-65-74-70=277	−11	2 strokes	(England) Charley Hull (Japan) Minami Katsu
2	2 Nov 2025	Maybank Championship	66-70-69-65=270	−18	Playoff	(South Korea) Choi Hye-jin (Australia) Hannah Green
3	21 Jun 2026	Meijer LPGA Classic	72-68-67-64=271	−17	Playoff	(England) Lottie Woad
4	23 Aug 2026	CPKC Women's Open	62-64-65-66=257	−23	9 strokes	(Japan) Yuri Yoshida
5	1 Nov 2026	Maybank Championship (2)	65-66-67-68=266	−22	2 strokes	(China) Liu Yan

^{1} Co-sanctioned by the Ladies European Tour.

LPGA Tour playoff record (2–0)

No.	Year	Tournament	Opponent(s)	Result
1	2025	Maybank Championship	(South Korea) Choi Hye-jin (Australia) Hannah Green	Won with birdie on first extra hole
2	2026	Meijer LPGA Classic	(England) Lottie Woad	Won with birdie on first extra hole

=== Ladies European Tour (2) ===
No.	Date	Tournament	Winning score	To par to	Margin of victory	Runner(s)-up
1	3 Aug 2025	**AIG Women's Open**^{[2]}	68-65-74-70=277	−11	2 strokes	(England) Charley Hull (Japan) Minami Katsu
2	11 Oct 2026	Aramco Korea Championship	67-68-68-63=266	−22	3 strokes	(Czech Republic) Sára Kousková

^{2} Co-sanctioned by the LPGA Tour.

=== LPGA of Japan Tour wins (14) ===
No.	Date	Tournament	Winning score	To par	Margin of victory	Runner(s)-up
1	18 Apr 2021	KKT Cup Vantelin Ladies Open	67-69-66=202	−14	5 strokes	(Japan) Ayaka Furue (Japan) Sakura Koiwai
2	8 May 2022	**World Ladies Championship Salonpas Cup**	64-74-67-71=276	−12	3 strokes	(Japan) Serena Aoki
3	12 Jun 2022	Ai Miyazato Suntory Ladies Open	68-71-69-68=276	−12	1 stroke	(Japan) Saiki Fujita
4	25 Sep 2022	Miyagi TV Cup Dunlop Women's Open	60-67-71=198	−18	5 strokes	(Japan) Kana Mikashima (Japan) Rio Takeda
5	13 Nov 2022	Ito En Ladies Golf Tournament	66-67-71=204	−12	1 stroke	(Japan) Momoko Kishibe
6	27 Nov 2022	**Japan LPGA Tour Championship Ricoh Cup**	66-70-67-70=273	−15	Playoff	(Japan) Minami Katsu
7	9 Apr 2023	Fuji Film Studio Alice Ladies Open	67-68=135	−9	1 stroke	(Japan) Miyuu Abe (Japan) Chisato Iwai
8	21 May 2023	Bridgestone Ladies Open	66-70-65-65=266	−18	7 strokes	(Japan) Akie Iwai
9	28 May 2023	Resort Trust Ladies	68-65-66-68=267	−27	4 strokes	(Japan) Miyū Sato
10	18 Jun 2023	Nichirei Ladies	65-65-69=199	−17	3 strokes	(Japan) Akie Iwai
11	26 Nov 2023	**Japan LPGA Tour Championship Ricoh Cup**	69-69-70-70=278	−10	3 strokes	(Japan) Sayaka Takahashi
12	13 Oct 2024	Fujitsu Ladies	66-70-66=202	−14	Playoff	(Japan) Ayaka Furue
13	17 Nov 2024	Daio Paper Elleair Ladies Open	65-65-64-68=262	−23	2 strokes	(Japan) Ai Suzuki
14	13 Sep 2026	**Sony JLPGA Championship**	71-70-69-69=279	−9	Playoff	(Japan) Yuzuki Yoshizawa

Tournaments in bold denotes major tournaments in LPGA of Japan Tour.

== Majors championships ==
=== Wins (1) ===
Year	Championship	54 holes	Winning score	Margin	Runners-up
2025	AIG Women's Open	1 shot lead	−11 (68-65-74-70=277)	2 strokes	(England) Charley Hull, (Japan) Minami Katsu

=== Results timeline ===
Results not in chronological order.

Tournament	2022	2023	2024	2025	2026
Chevron Championship			T17	T30	T21
U.S. Women's Open		CUT	T12	T36	T34
Women's PGA Championship			T2	T6	T12
The Evian Championship		T48	T39	T14	T4
Women's British Open	13	T21	CUT	1	CUT

Win
Top 10
Did not play

CUT = missed the half-way cut
"T" = tied

=== Summary ===
Tournament	Wins	2nd	3rd	Top-5	Top-10	Top-25	Events	Cuts made
Chevron Championship	0	0	0	0	0	2	3	3
U.S. Women's Open	0	0	0	0	0	1	4	3
Women's PGA Championship	0	1	0	1	2	3	3	3
The Evian Championship	0	0	0	1	1	2	4	4
Women's British Open	1	0	0	1	1	3	5	3
Totals	1	1	0	3	4	11	19	16

== World ranking ==
Position in Women's World Golf Rankings at the end of each calendar year.

Year	Ranking	Source
2018	836	
2019	766	
2020	312	
2021	64	
2022	23	
2023	19	
2024	13	
2025	4	

== Team appearances ==
Professional

- International Crown (representing Japan): 2025
