= Mamiko Higa =

Japanese professional golfer (born 1993)

Personal information
- Nationality: Japan
- Born: 11 October 1993 (age 33) Motobu, Kunigami, Okinawa, Japan
- Height: 161 cm (5 ft 3 in)
- Spouse: Ikioi Shōta

Career
- Sport: Golf
- Status: Professional
- Current tour: LPGA of Japan Tour
- Professional wins: 5

Number of wins by tour
- LPGA of Japan Tour: 5

Best results in LPGA major championships
- Chevron Championship: CUT: 2019
- Women's PGA C'ship: DNP
- U.S. Women's Open: T5: 2019
- Women's British Open: T4: 2018
- Evian Championship: CUT: 2019

Mamiko Higa (born 11 October 1993) is a Japanese professional golfer.

== Amateur career ==
Higa represented Japan at the 2010 Asian Games. She finished 8th in the individual competition and 4th in the team competition.

== Professional career ==
Higa plays on the LPGA of Japan Tour where she has five wins. She has twice finished in the top-10 at the Women's British Open – T7 in 2013 and T4 in 2018. In her first U.S. Women's Open appearance, she led after the first round.

== Personal life ==
Higa is in a relationship with professional sumo wrestler Ikioi Shōta.

== Professional wins (5) ==
=== LPGA of Japan Tour wins (5) ===
No.	Date	Tournament	Winning score	To par	Margin of victory	Runner(s)-up
1	7 April 2013	Yamaha Ladies Open Katsuragi	69-74-71-70=284	−4	Playoff	(Taiwan) Teresa Lu (Japan) Kaori Ohe
2	2 Jun 2013	Resort Trust Ladies	69-66-67=202	−14	2 strokes	(Japan) Mayu Hattori
3	13 Aug 2017	NEC Karuizawa 72	64-69-71=204	−12	Playoff	(South Korea) Kim Ha-neul
4	15 Apr 2018	KKT Cup Vantelin Ladies Open	71-73-66=210	−6	1 stroke	(Japan) Misuzu Narita
5	10 Mar 2019	Daikin Orchid Ladies	70-66-71-76=283	−5	3 strokes	(Japan) Lala Anai (Japan) Hina Arakaki (Japan) Eimi Koga

== Results in LPGA majors ==
Results not in chronological order before 2019.

Tournament	2013	2014	2015	2016	2017	2018	2019	2020
ANA Inspiration							CUT	
U.S. Women's Open							T5	T61
Women's PGA Championship								
The Evian Championship							CUT	NT
Women's British Open	T7	CUT				T4	CUT	

Top 10
Did not play

CUT = missed the half-way cut
NT = no tournament
T = tied

== Team appearances ==
Amateur

- Espirito Santo Trophy (representing Japan): 2010

Professional

- International Crown (representing Japan): 2014, 2018
- The Queens (representing LPGA of Japan Tour): 2017
