= Misuzu Narita =

Japanese professional golfer

Personal information
- Nationality: Japan
- Born: 8 October 1992 (age 34) Ichihara, Chiba, Japan
- Height: 168 cm (5 ft 6 in)

Career
- Sport: Golf
- College: Nippon Sport Science University
- Status: Professional
- Current tour: LPGA of Japan Tour
- Professional wins: 13

Number of wins by tour
- LPGA of Japan Tour: 13

Best results in LPGA major championships
- Chevron Championship: DNP
- Women's PGA C'ship: DNP
- U.S. Women's Open: T55: 2014
- Women's British Open: T50: 2015
- Evian Championship: DNP

Achievements and awards
- LPGA of Japan Tour Rookie of the Year: 2012
- JLPGA Shiseido Anessa Beauty of the Year: 2018

Misuzu Narita (成田 美寿々, Narita Misuzu; born 8 October 1992) is a Japanese professional golfer with over a dozen wins on the LPGA of Japan Tour.

== Career ==
Narita was born in Ichihara, Chiba. As an amateur, she won the Kanto Junior Golf and East Japan Women's Public Amateur, and dropped out of Nippon Sport Science University to play golf professionally on the LPGA of Japan Tour. She saw immediate success, winning the 2012 Fujitsu Ladies and the 2012 Rookie of the Year Award. By 2014, after she won her first JLPGA Major, the World Ladies Championship Salonpas Cup, she featured in the top-50 on the Women's World Golf Rankings.

Narita finished 5th on the JLPGA money list in 2014 and 2018, earning her starts at the U.S. Women's Open and Women's British Open. She made her first JLPGA hole-in-one at the third round of 2016 Nipponham Ladies Classic. By 2019, she became one of 30 golfers with JLPGA career earnings in excess of half a billion yen.

She represented Japan at the 2018 International Crown and on the winning The Queens teams in 2015 and 2017.

In 2018, she was awarded the JLPGA Shiseido Anessa Beauty of the Year.

== Professional wins (13) ==
=== LPGA of Japan Tour wins (13) ===
No.	Date	Tournament	Winning score	To par	Margin of victory	Runner(s)-up
1	14 Oct 2012	Fujitsu Ladies	71-69-67=207	−9	2 strokes	(Japan) Lala Anai
2	18 Aug 2013	NEC Karuizawa 72	72-65-65=202	−14	Playoff	(South Korea) Esther Lee
3	11 May 2014	**World Ladies Championship Salonpas Cup**	74-72-66-67=279	−9	1 stroke	(China) Shanshan Feng
4	8 Jun 2014	Yonex Ladies Golf Tournament	68-68-72=208	−8	Playoff	(Japan) Shiho Oyama (Japan) Erina Yamato
5	20 Jul 2014	Samantha Thavasa Girls Collection Ladies Tournament	66-67-67=200	−16	Playoff	(Japan) Kotono Kozuma
6	12 April 2015	Studio Alice Ladies Open	73-70-64=207	−9	2 strokes	(Japan) Hikari Fujita
7	14 Jun 2015	Suntory Ladies Open	63-71-68-70=272	−16	2 strokes	(South Korea) Lee Bo-mee
8	30 Jul 2017	Daito Kentaku Eheyanet Ladies	70-65-65-67=267	−21	4 strokes	(Taiwan) Teresa Lu
9	10 Jun 2018	Suntory Ladies Open	70-69-67-66=272	−16	Playoff	(Japan) Chie Arimura
10	24 Jun 2018	Earth Mondahmin Cup	68-65-71-67=271	−17	3 strokes	(Japan) Ai Suzuki
11	14 Oct 2018	Fujitsu Ladies	71-69-68=208	−8	1 stroke	(South Korea) Ahn Sun-ju
12	7 Apr 2019	Yamaha Ladies Open Katsuragi	73-74-69-67=283	−5	1 stroke	(South Korea) Ahn Sun-ju
13	4 Aug 2019	Daito Kentaku Eheyanet Ladies	70-70-67-70=277	−11	1 stroke	(Japan) Chie Arimura (South Korea) Bae Seon-woo

Tournaments in bold denotes major tournaments in LPGA of Japan Tour.

== Results in LPGA majors ==
Results not in chronological order before 2019.

Tournament	2014	2015	2016	2017	2018	2019
ANA Inspiration						
U.S. Women's Open	T55	CUT				T62
Women's PGA Championship						
The Evian Championship						
Women's British Open	CUT	T50			CUT	

Did not play

CUT = missed the half-way cut
T = tied

=== Summary ===
Tournament	Wins	2nd	3rd	Top-5	Top-10	Top-25	Events	Cuts made
ANA Inspiration	0	0	0	0	0	0	0	0
U.S. Women's Open	0	0	0	0	0	0	3	2
Women's PGA Championship	0	0	0	0	0	0	0	0
The Evian Championship	0	0	0	0	0	0	0	0
Women's British Open	0	0	0	0	0	0	2	1
Totals	0	0	0	0	0	0	5	3

- Most consecutive cuts made – 1 (three times)
- Longest streak of top-10s – 0

== Team appearances ==
- The Queens (representing Japan): 2015 (winners), 2017 (winners)
- International Crown (representing Japan): 2018
- Hitachi 3Tours Championship (representing LPGA of Japan Tour): 2014 (winners)
