= Ayaka Furue =

Japanese professional golfer (born 2000)

Ayaka Furue 古江 彩佳
Personal information
- Nationality: Japan
- Born: 27 May 2000 (age 26) Kobe, Kansai, Japan
- Height: 153 cm (5 ft 0 in)

Career
- Sport: Golf
- Turned professional: 2019
- Current tours: LPGA of Japan Tour; LPGA Tour
- Professional wins: 10

Number of wins by tour
- LPGA Tour: 2
- Ladies European Tour: 2
- LPGA of Japan Tour: 8

Best results in LPGA major championships (wins: 1)
- Chevron Championship: T30: 2025
- Women's PGA C'ship: T8: 2023
- U.S. Women's Open: T6: 2023, 2024
- Women's British Open: T20: 2021
- Evian Championship: Won: 2024

Achievements and awards
- LPGA Vare Trophy: 2024
- LPGA of Japan Tour Player of the Year: 2020–21

Ayaka Furue (古江 彩佳, Furue Ayaka) (born 27 May 2000) is a Japanese professional golfer. After playing on the LPGA of Japan Tour where she has eight wins, she currently plays on the LPGA Tour. She won her first LPGA Tour championship on 31 July 2022, at the Trust Golf Women's Scottish Open. She won her first major at the 2024 Evian Championship.

== Early life and amateur career ==
Furue was born in Kobe and started playing golf at the age of 3, coached by her father. She has also been a swimmer since the age of four in parallel with golf.

Furue won the Kansai Elementary School Golf Championship in 2012, and the Kansai Junior High School Golf Championship in 2014 and 2015, and while attending Kobe Municipal Nagata Junior High School she won the National Junior High School Golf Championship in 2015 and the Kansai High School Golf Championship in 2016. She participated in the 2016 Japan Women's Open Golf Championship where she made the cut and finished tied for 28th place.

She played for the Japan National Team in 2017 and 2018. She won the 2018 Junior Golf World Cup with the team and finished 4th individually. She was also 4th individually at the 2018 Asian Games, where the Japan team finished 5th.

Furue won the 2019 Fujitsu Ladies on the LPGA of Japan Tour as an amateur, thus was awarded exemption of the JLPGA Player Certification Test, and turned professional shortly afterwards.

== Professional career ==
Furue recorded three victories and two runner-up finishes on the LPGA of Japan Tour in 2020. She shot up to No. 42 in the Women's World Golf Rankings to secure a spot at the 2020 U.S. Women's Open, where she did not make the cut.

In 2021, she won a further three tournaments and rose to No. 14 in the world rankings. She was in contention at the 2021 Evian Championship where she birdied three of the last four holes to claim fourth ahead of Atthaya Thitikul.

At the 2021 Women's British Open, Furue started the final round four shots behind co-leaders Anna Nordqvist and Nanna Koerstz Madsen, but lost ground on the leaders and ended tied for 20th as she carded a level-par round of 72 that featured an eagle, two birdies and four bogeys.

Furue earned her card for the 2022 LPGA Tour through qualifying school.

She won her first LPGA Tour tournament, at the Trust Golf Women's Scottish Open on 31 July 2022, shooting a course record 10-under-par 62 (267, −21) in the final round to win by three strokes over Céline Boutier, after trailing by four strokes after 54 holes to co-leaders Boutier and Lydia Ko.

In 2024, Furue won her first major at the Evian Championship. She scored an eagle on the final hole to win by one stroke over Stephanie Kyriacou.

== Amateur wins ==
- 2012 Kansai Elementary School Golf Championship
- 2014 Kansai Junior High School Golf Championship
- 2015 Kansai Junior High School Golf Championship, National Junior High School Golf Championship
- 2016 Kansai High School Golf Championship
- 2018 Kansai Women's Amateur Championship

== Professional wins (10) ==
=== LPGA Tour wins (2) ===
Legend
Major championships (1)
Other LPGA Tour (1)

No.	Date	Tournament	Winning score	To par	Margin of victory	Runner-up	Winner's share ($)
1	31 Jul 2022	Trust Golf Women's Scottish Open^{[1]}	69-68-68-62=267	−21	3 strokes	(France) Céline Boutier	300,000
2	14 Jul 2024	Amundi Evian Championship^{[1]}	65-65-70-65=265	−19	1 stroke	(Australia) Stephanie Kyriacou	1,200,000

^{1} Co-sanctioned by the Ladies European Tour.

=== LPGA of Japan Tour wins (8) ===
No.	Date	Tournament	Winning score	To par	Margin of victory	Runner(s)-up
1	20 Oct 2019	Fujitsu Ladies^{a}	67-65-67=199	−17	2 strokes	(Japan) Mone Inami (Japan) Kana Mikashima
2	20 Sep 2020	Descente Ladies Tokai Classic	66-67-68=201	−15	Playoff	(Japan) Hiroko Azuma
3	15 Nov 2020	Ito En Ladies Golf Tournament	69-65-70=204	−12	Playoff	(Japan) Miki Sakai
4	22 Nov 2020	Daio Paper Elleair Ladies Open	65-71-64-69=269	−15	3 strokes	(South Korea) Lee Min-young
5	17 Oct 2021	Fujitsu Ladies	65-67=132	−12	Playoff	(Japan) Minami Katsu
6	24 Oct 2021	Nobuta Group Masters GC Ladies	69-71-67-69=276	−12	1 stroke	(Japan) Mao Saigo
7	7 Nov 2021	Toto Japan Classic	68-67-68-69=272	−16	3 strokes	(Japan) Mone Inami
8	16 Oct 2022	Fujitsu Ladies	66-65-69=200	−16	1 stroke	(Japan) Akie Iwai

^{a} Ayaka won the 2019 Fujitsu Ladies as an amateur.

== Major championships ==
=== Wins (1) ===
Year	Championship	54 holes	Winning score	Margin	Runner-up
2024	Evian Championship	1 stroke deficit	−19 (65-65-70-65=265)	1 stroke	(Australia) Stephanie Kyriacou

=== Results timeline ===
Results not in chronological order.

Tournament	2020	2021	2022	2023	2024	2025	2026
Chevron Championship			T44	T52	T50	T30	T49
U.S. Women's Open	CUT		CUT	T6	T6	CUT	T40
Women's PGA Championship			CUT	T8	T19	CUT	T19
The Evian Championship	NT	4	T19	T36	1	T59	T53
Women's British Open		T20	CUT	T21	T37	T33	T53

Won
Top 10
Did not play

CUT = missed the half-way cut
NT = no tournament
T = tied

=== Summary ===
Tournament	Wins	2nd	3rd	Top-5	Top-10	Top-25	Events	Cuts made
Chevron Championship	0	0	0	0	0	0	5	5
U.S. Women's Open	0	0	0	0	2	2	6	3
Women's PGA Championship	0	0	0	0	1	3	5	3
The Evian Championship	1	0	0	2	2	3	6	6
Women's British Open	0	0	0	0	0	2	6	5
Totals	1	0	0	2	5	10	28	22

- Most consecutive cuts made – 11 (2023 Chevron – 2025 Chevron)
- Longest streak of top-10s – 1 (five times)

== LPGA Tour career summary ==
Year	Tournaments played	Cuts made*	Wins	2nd	3rd	Top 10s	Best finish	Earnings ($)	Money list rank	Scoring average	Scoring rank
2020	1	0	0	0	0	0	CUT	n/a	n/a	n/a	n/a
2021	2	2	0	0	0	1	4	n/a	n/a	n/a	n/a
2022	27	24	1	1	1	4	1	957,831	29	70.34	21
2023	24	22	0	1	2	8	2	1,637,334	13	70.30	16
2024	24	23	1	1	2	12	0	2,811,824	6	69.99	3
2025	25	20	0	1	1	5	T2	1,022,843	41	70.44	25
Totals^	100 (2022)	89 (2022)	2	4	6	29	1	6,429,832	67		

^ official as of 2025 season
*Includes matchplay and other tournaments without a cut.

== World ranking ==
Position in Women's World Golf Rankings at the end of each calendar year.

Year	Ranking	Source
2016	768	
2017	600	
2018	413	
2019	82	
2020	16	
2021	14	
2022	22	
2023	24	
2024	8	
2025	29	

== Team appearances ==
Amateur

- Neighbors Trophy Team Championship (representing Japan): 2017
- Queen Sirikit Cup (representing Japan): 2017, 2018
- Junior Golf World Cup (representing Japan): 2017, 2018 (winners)
- Asian Games (representing Japan): 2018

Professional

- International Crown (representing Japan): 2023, 2025
