= Momoko Osato =

Japanese professional golfer

Momoko Osato 大里桃子
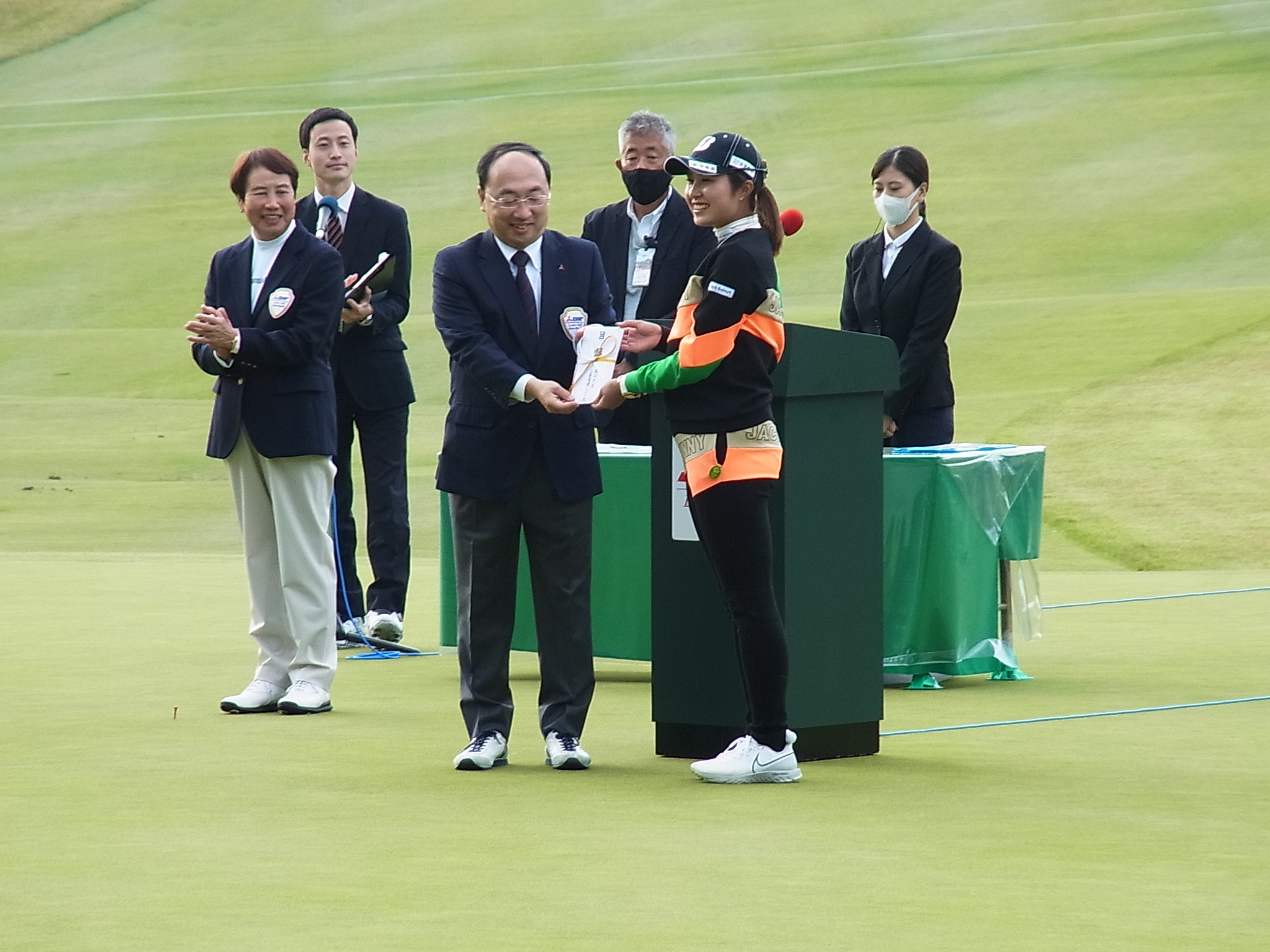
- Hole in One Award (Musashigaoka Golf Course, October 2021)

Personal information
- Nationality: Japan
- Born: 10 August 1998 (age 28) Nankan, Kumamoto, Japan
- Height: 1.7 m (5 ft 7 in)

Career
- Sport: Golf
- Turned professional: 2018
- Current tour: LPGA of Japan Tour
- Professional wins: 3

Number of wins by tour
- LPGA of Japan Tour: 3

Best results in LPGA major championships
- Chevron Championship: DNP
- Women's PGA C'ship: DNP
- U.S. Women's Open: DNP
- Women's British Open: T22: 2024
- Evian Championship: DNP

Momoko Osato (大里桃子; born 10 August 1998 in Nankan, Kumamoto) is a Japanese professional golfer. She plays on the LPGA of Japan Tour where she was won twice.

== Professional wins (3) ==
=== LPGA of Japan Tour wins (3) ===
No.	Date	Tournament	Winning score	To par	Margin of victory	Runner-up	Ref.
1	19 Aug 2018	CAT Ladies	70-66-73=209	−10	2 strokes	(China) Haruka Morita-WanyaoLu	
2	16 May 2021	Hoken No Madoguchi Ladies	67-68=135	−9	Playoff	(Japan) Shoko Sasaki	
3	9 Jun 2024	Ai Miyazato Suntory Ladies Open	65-73-71-67=276	−12	2 strokes	(Japan) Miyū Yamashita	
