= Mone Inami =

Japanese professional golfer (born 1999)

Mone Inami 稲見 萌寧
Personal information
- Nationality: Japan
- Born: 29 July 1999 (age 27) Toshima, Tokyo, Japan
- Height: 167 cm (5 ft 6 in)

Career
- Sport: Golf
- Turned professional: 2018
- Current tour: LPGA of Japan Tour
- Professional wins: 13

Number of wins by tour
- LPGA Tour: 1
- LPGA of Japan Tour: 13

Best results in LPGA major championships
- Chevron Championship: T46: 2024
- Women's PGA C'ship: WD: 2024
- U.S. Women's Open: T54: 2020
- Women's British Open: CUT: 2020
- Evian Championship: DNP

Achievements and awards
- LPGA of Japan Tour leading money winner: 2020–21
Medal record
Olympic Games
Silver medal – second place	2020 Tokyo	Individual

Mone Inami (稲見 萌寧, Inami Mone) (born 29 July 1999) is a Japanese professional golfer. She plays on the LPGA of Japan Tour where she has 13 wins.

Inami competed at the 2020 Summer Olympics. At those games, Inami shot a final round 65 and defeated Lydia Ko in a sudden-death playoff to win a silver medal in women's individual, on home soil.

She joined the LPGA of Japan Tour on 28 July 2018, which coincides with the eve of her 19th birthday.

== Professional wins ==
=== LPGA of Japan Tour wins (13) ===
No.	Date	Tournament	Winning score	To par	Margin of victory	Runner(s)-up
1	28 Jul 2019	Century 21 Ladies Golf Tournament	68-69-70=207	−9	1 stroke	(Japan) Serena Aoki (South Korea) Lee Na-ri
2	11 Oct 2020	Stanley Ladies Golf Tournament	72-67=139	−5	Playoff	(Japan) Saki Asai (South Korea) Bae Seon-woo
3	14 Mar 2021	Meiji Yasuda Life Ladies Yokohama Tire Golf Tournament	68-66-76=210	−6	Playoff	(Japan) Kana Nagai
4	4 Apr 2021	Yamaha Ladies Open Katsuragi	70-74-66-66=276	−12	1 stroke	(Japan) Miyū Yamashita
5	11 Apr 2021	Fujifilm Studio Alice Ladies Open	72-69-70=211	−5	Playoff	(Japan) Sakura Koiwai
6	25 Apr 2021	Fujisankei Ladies Classic	67-67-67=201	−12	3 strokes	(Japan) Miyū Yamashita
7	23 May 2021	Chukyo TV Bridgestone Ladies Open	61-68=129	−15	6 strokes	(Japan) Momoko Osato
8	29 Aug 2021	Nitori Ladies Golf Tournament	70-66-71-67=274	−16	1 stroke	(South Korea) Jeon Mi-jeong
9	12 Sep 2021	**Japan LPGA Championship Konica Minolta Cup**	70-70-65-64=269	−19	4 strokes	(Japan) Mao Saigo
10	14 Nov 2021	Ito En Ladies Golf Tournament	70-64-65=199	−17	9 strokes	(Japan) Shina Kanazawa (Japan) Mao Saigo
11	5 Jun 2022	Richard Mille Yonex Ladies Golf Tournament	69-69-71=209	−7	2 strokes	(Japan) Saiki Fujita (Japan) Chisato Iwai
12	28 Aug 2022	Nitori Ladies Golf Tournament	69-72-68-70=279	−9	2 strokes	(Japan) Yuna Nishimura (Japan) Nozomi Uetake (Japan) Miyū Yamashita
13	5 Nov 2023	Toto Japan Classic^{[1]}	64-68-65-69=266	−22	1 stroke	(South Korea) Bae Seon-woo (Japan) Shiho Kuwaki

^{1} Co-sanctioned by the LPGA Tour.
Tournaments in bold denotes major tournaments on the LPGA of Japan Tour.

=== LPGA Tour wins (1) ===
No.	Date	Tournament	Winning score	To par	Margin of victory	Runners-up
1	5 Nov 2023	Toto Japan Classic^{[2]}	64-68-65-69=266	−22	1 stroke	(South Korea) Bae Seon-woo (Japan) Shiho Kuwaki

^{2} Co-sanctioned by the LPGA of Japan Tour.

== Summer Olympics (1) ==
=== Singles: 1 (1 Silver Medal) ===
No.	Date	Tournament	Score	To par	Gold medalist	Silver medalist	Bronze medalist
1	7 Aug 2021	Summer Olympics, Tokyo, Japan	70-65-68-65=268	−16	(United States) Nelly Korda	–	(New Zealand) Lydia Ko

== Results in LPGA majors ==
Tournament	2020	2021	2022	2023	2024
Chevron Championship					T46
U.S. Women's Open	T54				CUT
Women's PGA Championship					WD
The Evian Championship	NT				
Women's British Open	CUT				

Did not play

CUT = missed the half-way cut
"T" = tied

== World ranking ==
Position in Women's World Golf Rankings at the end of each calendar year.

Year	World ranking	Source
2015	450	
2016	428	
2017	458	
2018	493	
2019	54	
2020	63	
2021	16	
2022	34	
2023	73	
2024	174	
2025	402	
