= Resort Trust Ladies =

Tournament information
- Established: 1993
- Tour: LPGA of Japan Tour
- Format: Stroke play
- Prize fund: ¥80 million
- Month played: May/June

Current champion
- (Japan) Yui Kawamoto

The Resort Trust Ladies golf tournament is an annual event on the LPGA of Japan Tour. It was first played in 1993. The 2020 edition of the tournament, scheduled to be played at Grandee Hamanako Golf Club in Shizuoka, was canceled due to the COVID-19 pandemic.

== Winners ==
- 2026 Yui Kawamoto
- 2025 Nanako Inagaki
- 2024 Akie Iwai
- 2023 Miyū Yamashita
- 2022 Sakura Koiwai
- 2021 Minami Katsu
- 2020 Cancelled
- 2019 Erika Hara
- 2018 Eri Okayama
- 2017 Kang Soo-yun
- 2016 Junko Omote
- 2015 Teresa Lu
- 2014 Teresa Lu
- 2013 Mamiko Higa
- 2012 Jeon Mi-jeong
- 2011 Sakura Yokomine
- 2010 Yoshimi Koda
- 2009 Jeon Mi-jeong
- 2008 Jeon Mi-jeong
- 2007 Momoko Ueda
- 2006 Mie Nakata
- 2005 Mitsuko Kawasaki
- 2004 Hiromi Mogi
- 2003 Yuri Fudoh
- 2002 Kozue Azuma
- 2001 Aki Takamura
- 2000 Yuri Fudoh
- 1999 Hiromi Takamura
- 1998 Kaori Harada
- 1997 Fumiko Muraguchi
- 1996 Aiko Hashimoto
- 1995 Wu Ming-yeh
- 1994 Tseng Hsiu-feng
- 1993 Miyuki Shimabukuro
