= Yonex Ladies Golf Tournament =

Annual event in Japan

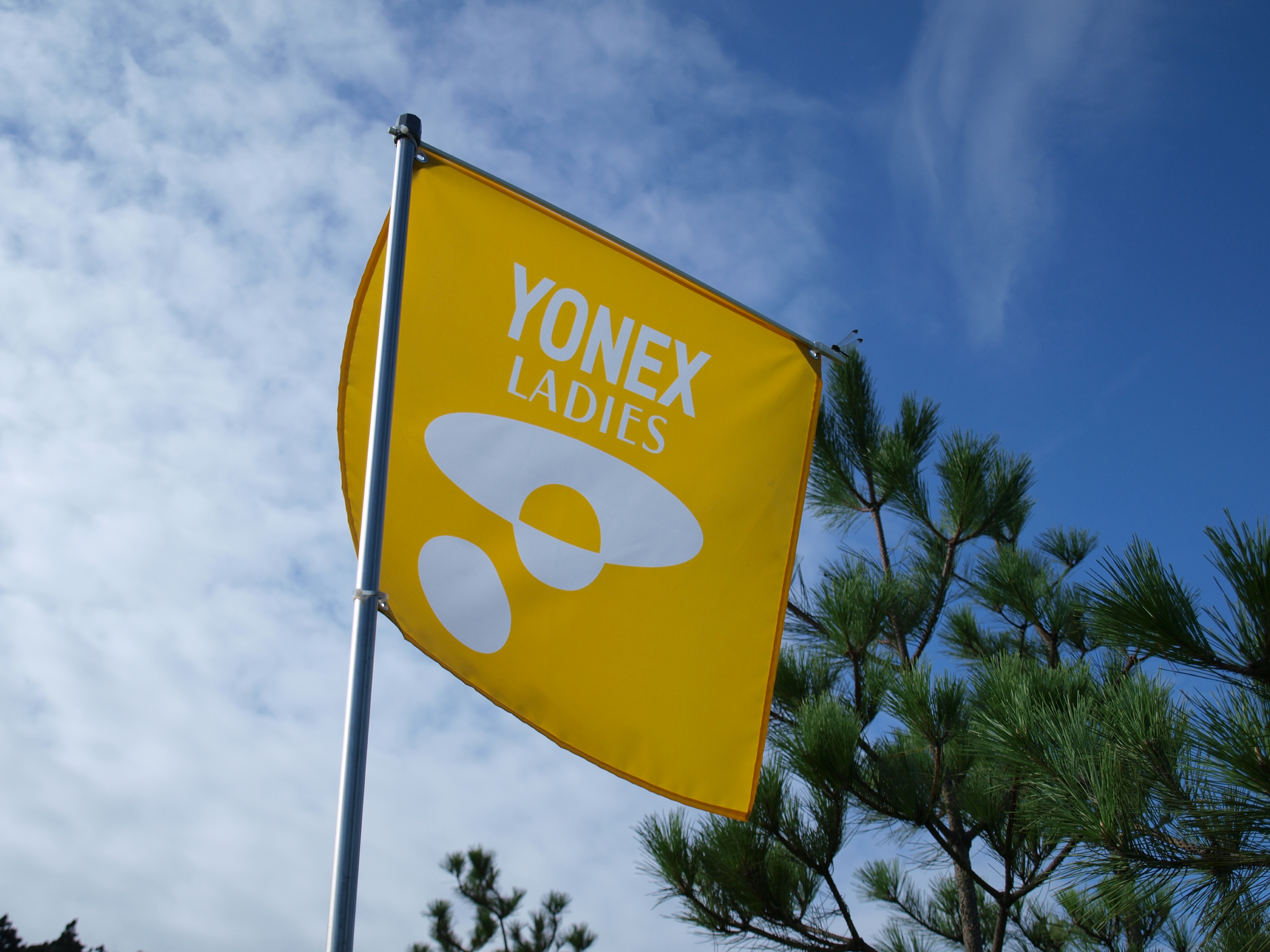
Yonex Ladies Golf Tournament

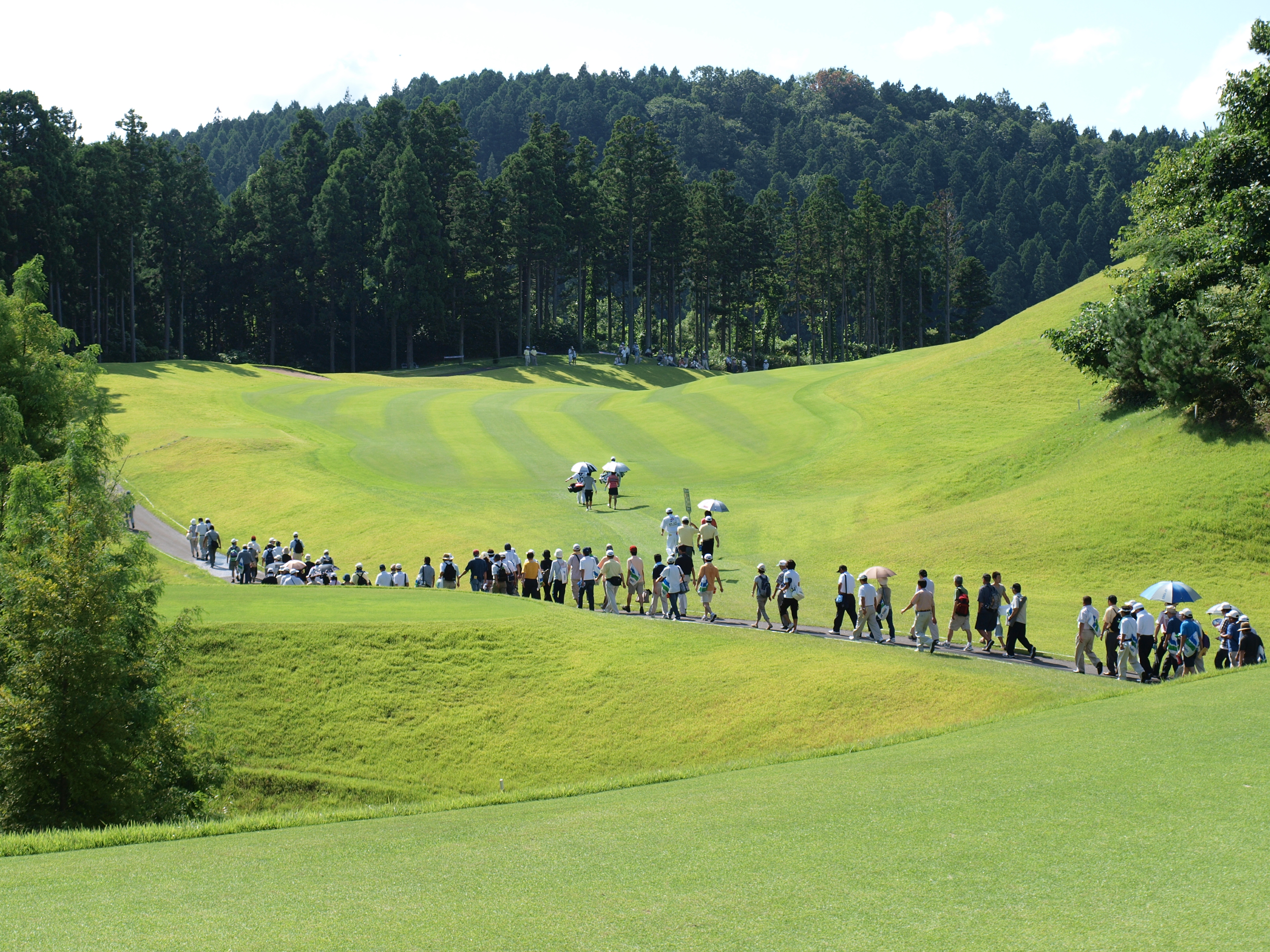
Yonex Ladies Golf Tournament 2008

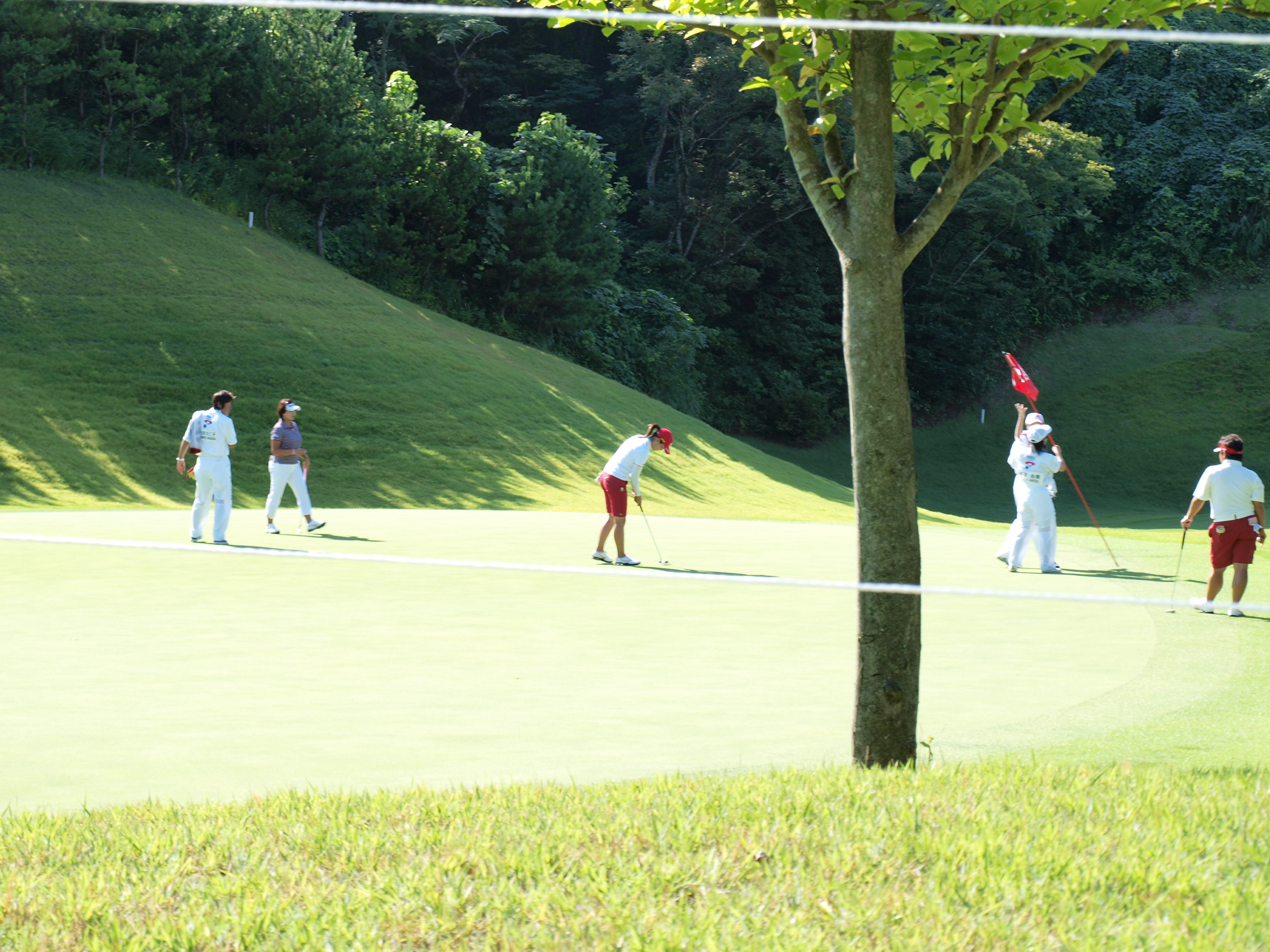
Yonex Ladies Golf Tournament 2008

The Yonex Ladies Golf Tournament (Japanese: ヨネックスレディスゴルフトーナメント, romanized: Yonekkusuredisugorufutōnamento) is an annual event on the LPGA of Japan Tour. It was first played in 1999. The host venue is the Yonex Country Club in Niigata Prefecture. The 2021 prize money is ¥70,000,000 the winner's share is ¥12,600,000.

== Winners ==
- 2026 Rin Yoshida
- 2025 Aihi Takano
- 2024 Hina Arakaki
- 2023 Fumika Kawagishi
- 2022 Mone Inami
- 2021 Ritsuko Ryu
- 2020 Cancelled
- 2019 Momoko Ueda
- 2018 Shiho Oyama
- 2017 Serena Aoki
- 2016 Porani Chutichai
- 2015 Shiho Oyama
- 2014 Misuzu Narita
- 2013 Junko Omote
- 2012 Shanshan Feng
- 2011 Hiromi Mogi
- 2010 Jeon Mi-jeong
- 2009 Jeon Mi-jeong
- 2008 Rui Kitada
- 2007 Yuri Fudoh
- 2006 Shiho Oyama
- 2005 Shin Hyun-ju
- 2004 Yukari Baba
- 2003 Miho Koga
- 2002 Yuri Fudoh
- 2001 Yuri Fudoh
- 2000 Kyoko Ono
- 1999 Natsuko Noro
