= Suntory Ladies Open =

Golf tournament in Hyōgo Prefecture, Japan

The Suntory Ladies Open (also called the Ai Miyazato Suntory Ladies Open) is an annual golf tournament on the LPGA of Japan Tour. It is first played in 1990. The event is held in Hyogo, currently at the Rokko International Golf Club. The prize fund for 2021 was ¥150,000,000 with ¥27,000,000 going to the winner.

== Winners ==
- 2026 Shiho Kuwaki
- 2025 Sayaka Takahashi
- 2024 Momoko Osato
- 2023 Chisato Iwai
- 2022 Miyū Yamashita
- 2021 Serena Aoki
- 2020 Cancelled
- 2019 Ai Suzuki
- 2018 Misuzu Narita
- 2017 Kim Ha-neul
- 2016 Kang Soo-yun
- 2015 Misuzu Narita
- 2014 Ahn Sun-ju
- 2013 Rikako Morita
- 2012 Kim Hyo-joo (amateur)
- 2011 Ahn Sun-ju
- 2010 Akane Iijima
- 2009 Shinobu Moromizato
- 2008 Momoko Ueda
- 2007 Zhang Na
- 2006 Nikki Campbell
- 2005 Yuri Fudoh
- 2004 Ai Miyazato
- 2003 Lee Ji-hee
- 2002 Takayo Bandoh
- 2001 Michiko Hattori
- 2000 Aki Nakano
- 1999 Kaori Higo
- 1998 Marnie McGuire
- 1997 Ikuyo Shiotani
- 1996 Won Jae-sook
- 1995 No tournament Kobe earthquake
- 1994 Masaki Maeda
- 1993 Masaki Maeda
- 1992 Reiko Kashiwado
- 1991 Fumiko Muraguchi
- 1990 Huang Yueh-chyn
