= Fujitsu Ladies =

Japanese women's golf tournament

The Fujitsu Ladies is an annual golf tournament for professional female golfers on LPGA of Japan Tour. It is generally played in October and in recent years at the Tokyu Seven Hundred Club, Chiba, Chiba. It was founded in 1983. For 2025, the total prize money for the tournament is ¥100,000,000 with ¥18,000,000 going to the winner.

== Winners ==
- 2026 Ai Suzuki
- 2025 Ayako Kimura
- 2024 Miyū Yamashita
- 2023 Kokona Sakurai
- 2022 Ayaka Furue
- 2021 Ayaka Furue
- 2020 Jiyai Shin
- 2019 Ayaka Furue
- 2018 Misuzu Narita
- 2017 Teresa Lu
- 2016 Ayaka Matsumori
- 2015 Teresa Lu
- 2014 Ahn Sun-ju
- 2013 Lee Na-ri
- 2012 Misuzu Narita
- 2011 Saiki Fujita
- 2010 Ahn Sun-ju
- 2009 Nikki Campbell
- 2008 Yuri Fudoh
- 2007 Sakura Yokomine
- 2006 Jeon Mi-jeong
- 2005 Yuri Fudoh
- 2004 Michiko Hattori
- 2003 Yuri Fudoh
- 2002 Chihiro Nakajima
- 2001 Yuri Fudoh
- 2000 Michie Ohba
- 1999 Michiko Hattori
- 1998 Kaori Higo
- 1997 Aiko Takase
- 1996 Akiko Fukushima
- 1995 Hiromi Kobayashi
- 1994 Kikuko Shibata
- 1993 Mayumi Hirase
- 1992 Patti Rizzo
- 1991 Ikuyo Shiotani
- 1990 Chieko Nishida
- 1989 Amy Benz
- 1988 Aiko Takasu
- 1987 Atsuko Hikage
- 1986 Hisako Higuchi
- 1985 Tomiko Ikebuchi
- 1984 Nayoko Yoshikawa
- 1983 Nayoko Yoshikawa
