= Korean players' victories on LPGA of Japan Tour =

This table lists Korean players who have victories on the LPGA of Japan Tour. They do not include team events or unofficial events.

The list is complete through the 2025 season.

No.	Date	Tournament	Winner
1	31 Mar 1985	Kibun Ladies Classic	Ku Ok-hee (1)
2	7 Apr 1985	Tohato Ladies	Ku Ok-hee (2)
3	16 Jun 1985	Tohoku Queens	Ku Ok-hee (3)
4	27 Sep 1987	Miyagi TV Cup Women's Open	Kim Man-soo (1)
5	4 Oct 1987	Tokai Classic	Ku Ok-hee (4)
6	21 Oct 1990	Ben Hogan & Itsuki Classic	Ku Ok-hee (5)
7	5 May 1991	SAZALE Queens	Ku Ok-hee (6)
8	1 Dec 1991	**JLPGA Meiji Dairies Cup**	Ku Ok-hee (7)
9	29 Mar 1992	Kibun Ladies Classic	Lee Young-me (1)
10	2 Aug 1992	Stanley Ladies	Lee Young-me (2)
11	13 Sep 1992	**Japan LPGA Championship**	Ku Ok-hee (8)
12	24 Oct 1993	Karasumajo & Itsuki Classic	Ku Ok-hee (9)
13	3 Apr 1994	Kibun Ladies Classic	Ko Woo-soon (1)
14	8 May 1994	Gunze Cup World Ladies	Won Jae-sook (1)
15	29 May 1994	Toto Motors Ladies	Won Jae-sook (2)
16	7 Aug 1994	Asahikokusai Ladies	Lee Young-me (3)
17	25 Sep 1994	Miyagi TV Cup Women's Open	Won Jae-sook (3)
18	6 Nov 1994	Toray Japan Queens Cup	Ko Woo-soon (2)
19	5 Nov 1995	Toray Japan Queens Cup	Ko Woo-soon (3)
20	17 Mar 1996	Saishunkan Ladies	Lee Young-me (4)
21	26 May 1996	Toto Motors Ladies	Shin So-ra (1)
22	9 Jun 1996	Suntory Ladies Open	Won Jae-sook (4)
23	7 Jul 1996	Toyo Suisan Ladies Hokkaido	Ku Ok-hee (10)
24	4 Aug 1996	Mizuno Ladies	Lee Young-me (5)
25	17 Nov 1996	Daio Paper Elleair Women's Open	Ku Ok-hee (11)
26	9 Mar 1997	Daikin Orchid Ladies	Ko Woo-soon (4)
27	27 Apr 1997	Nasuogawa Ladies	Ko Woo-soon (5)
28	4 May 1997	Katokichi Queens	Won Jae-sook (5)
29	22 Jun 1997	Dunlop Twin Lakes Ladies Open	Ku Ok-hee (12)
30	23 Nov 1997	Daio Paper Elleair Women's Open	Ku Ok-hee (13)
31	8 Mar 1998	Daikin Orchid Ladies	Kim Ae-sook (1)
32	24 May 1998	Chukyo TV Bridgestone Ladies Open	Ku Ok-hee (14)
33	31 May 1998	Toto Motors Ladies	Lee Young-me (6)
34	29 Nov 1998	**JLPGA Meiji Dairies Cup**	Lee Young-me (7)
35	24 Apr 1999	Nasuogawa Ladies	Ku Ok-hee (15)
36	15 Aug 1999	NEC Karuizawa 72	Hee-Won Han (1)
37	19 Sep 1999	Yukijirushi Ladies Tokai Classic	Lee Young-me (8)
38	26 Sep 1999	Miyagi TV Cup Dunlop Women's Open	Ok-Hee Ku (16)
39	3 Oct 1999	Osaka Women's Open	Hee-Won Han (2)
40	30 Jul 2000	Golf5 Ladies	Won Jae-sook (6)
41	24 Sep 2000	Miyagi TV Cup Dunlop Women's Open	Ok-Hee Ku (17)
42	22 Oct 2000	Hisako Higuchi Kibun Classic	Woo-Soon Ko (6)
43	12 Nov 2000	Itoen Ladies	Ok-Hee Ku (18)
44	19 Nov 2000	Daio Paper Elleair Ladies Open	Ok-Hee Ku (19)
45	18 Nov 2001	Daio Paper Elleair Ladies Open	Lee Ji-hee (1)
46	26 May 2002	Chukyo TV Bridgestone Ladies Open	Shin Sora (2)
47	8 Sep 2002	Fujisankei Ladies Classic	Ok-Hee Ku (20)
48	15 Sep 2002	**Japan LPGA Championship Konica Cup**	Ok-Hee Ku (21)
49	6 Oct 2002	**Japan Women's Open Golf Championship**	Woo-Soon Ko (7)
50	1 Dec 2002	**Japan LPGA Tour Championship Ricoh Cup**	Woo-Soon Ko (8)
51	13 Apr 2003	Promise Ladies	Lee Ji-hee (2)
52	20 Apr 2003	Saishunkan Ladies Hinokuni Open	Lee Ji-hee (3)
53	18 May 2003	Vernal Ladies	Ok-Hee Ku (22)
54	15 Jun 2003	Suntory Ladies Open	Lee Ji-hee (4)
55	12 Oct 2003	Sankyo Ladies Open	Lee Ji-hee (5)
56	19 Jun 2005	APiTa Circle K Sunkus Ladies	Ok-Hee Ku (23)
57	26 Jun 2005	Promise Ladies	Koo Yun-hee (1)
58	28 Aug 2005	Yonex Ladies	Shin Hyun-ju (1)
59	9 Oct 2005	Sankyo Ladies Open	Lee Ji-hee (6)
60	9 Apr 2006	Studio Alice Ladies Open	Lee Ji-hee (7)
61	14 May 2006	Vernal Ladies	Lee Ji-hee (8)
62	21 May 2006	Chukyo TV Bridgestone Ladies Open	Lee Ji-hee (9)
63	9 Jul 2006	Meiji Chocolate Cup	Jeon Mi-jeong (1)
64	23 Jul 2006	Philanthropy JLPGA Players Championship	Jeon Mi-jeong (2)
65	1 Oct 2006	**Japan Women's Open Golf Championship**	Jeong Jang (1)
66	15 Oct 2006	Fujitsu Ladies	Jeon Mi-jeong (3)
67	12 Nov 2006	Itoen Ladies	Shin Hyun-ju (2)
68	8 Apr 2007	Studio Alice Ladies Open	Bae Jae-hee (1)
69	29 Apr 2007	Yashima Queens	Jeon Mi-jeong (4)
70	6 May 2007	Salonpas World Ladies	Jeon Mi-jeong (5)
71	13 May 2007	Vernal Ladies	Jeon Mi-jeong (6)
72	7 Oct 2007	Sankyo Ladies Open	Kim So-hee (1)
73	28 Oct 2007	Hisako Higuchi IDC Otsuka Kagu Ladies	Jeon Mi-jeong (7)
74	9 Mar 2008	Daikin Orchid Ladies	Song Bo-bae (1)
75	23 Mar 2008	Yokohama Tire PRGR Ladies Cup	Jiyai Shin (1)
76	13 Apr 2008	Studio Alice Ladies Open	Shin Hyun-ju (3)
77	18 May 2008	Vernal Ladies	Lim Eun-a (1)
78	25 May 2008	Chukyo TV Bridgestone Ladies Open	Lee Ji-hee (10)
79	8 Jun 2008	Resort Trust Ladies	Jeon Mi-jeong (8)
80	27 Jul 2008	Kagome Philanthropy JLPGA Players Championship	Jeon Mi-jeong (9)
81	14 Sep 2008	**Japan LPGA Championship Konica Minolta Cup**	Shin Hyun-ju (4)
82	5 Oct 2008	**Japan Women's Open Golf Championship**	Lee Ji-hee (11)
83	9 Nov 2008	Mizuno Classic	Jiyai Shin (2)
84	5 Apr 2009	Yamaha Ladies Open	Hwang Ah-reum (1)
85	19 Apr 2009	Life Card Ladies	Lee Ji-hee (12)
86	24 May 2009	Chukyo TV Bridgestone Ladies Open	Lim Eun-a (2)
87	7 Jun 2009	Resort Trust Ladies	Jeon Mi-jeong (10)
88	12 Jul 2009	Meiji Chocolate Cup	Jeon Mi-jeong (11)
89	30 Aug 2009	Yonex Ladies	Jeon Mi-jeong (12)
90	4 Oct 2009	**Japan Women's Open Golf Championship**	Song Bo-bae (2)
91	25 Oct 2009	Masters GC Ladies	Jiyai Shin (3)
92	1 Nov 2009	Hisako Higuchi IDC Otsuka Kagu Ladies	Jeon Mi-jeong (13)
93	8 Nov 2009	Mizuno Classic	Song Bo-bae (3)
94	7 Mar 2010	Daikin Orchid Ladies	Ahn Sun-ju (1)
95	18 Apr 2010	Nishijin Ladies Classic	Inbee Park (1)
96	2 May 2010	Cyber Agent Ladies	Jiyai Shin (4)
97	30 May 2010	Yonex Ladies	Jeon Mi-jeong (14)
98	20 Jun 2010	Nichirei Ladies	Jeon Mi-jeong (15)
99	4 Jul 2010	Nichiiko Women's Open	Shin Hyun-ju (5)
100	18 Jul 2010	Stanley Ladies	Ahn Sun-ju (2)
101	15 Aug 2010	NEC Karuizawa 72	Lee Ji-hee (13)
102	19 Sep 2010	Munsingwear Ladies Tokai Classic	Jeon Mi-jeong (16)
103	26 Sep 2010	Miyagi TV Cup Dunlop Ladies Open	Lim Eun-a (3)
104	10 Oct 2010	Sankyo Ladies Open	Ahn Sun-ju (3)
105	17 Oct 2010	Fujitsu Ladies	Ahn Sun-ju (4)
106	7 Nov 2010	Mizuno Classic	Jiyai Shin (5)
107	21 Nov 2010	Daio Paper Elleair Ladies Open	Kim Na-ri (1)
108	28 Nov 2010	**Japan LPGA Tour Championship Ricoh Cup**	Inbee Park (2)
109	6 Mar 2011	Daikin Orchid Ladies	Inbee Park (3)
110	8 May 2011	**World Ladies Championship Salonpas Cup**	Ahn Sun-ju (5)
111	12 Jun 2011	Suntory Ladies Open	Ahn Sun-ju (6)
112	19 Jun 2011	Nichirei Ladies	Lee Ji-hee (14)
113	14 Aug 2011	NEC Karuizawa 72	Ahn Sun-ju (7)
114	9 Oct 2011	Sankyo Ladies Open	Ahn Sun-ju (8)
115	20 Nov 2011	Daio Paper Elleair Ladies Open	Lee Ji-hee (15)
116	27 Nov 2011	**Japan LPGA Tour Championship Ricoh Cup**	Jeon Mi-jeong (17)
117	11 Mar 2012	Yokohama Tire PRGR Ladies Cup	Lee Bo-mee (1)
118	18 Mar 2012	T-Point Ladies	Lee Ji-hee (16)
119	6 May 2012	**World Ladies Championship Salonpas Cup**	Ahn Sun-ju (9)
120	13 May 2012	Fundokin Ladies	Inbee Park (4)
121	20 May 2012	Chukyo TV Bridgestone Ladies Open	Lee Ji-hee (17)
122	3 Jun 2012	Resort Trust Ladies	Jeon Mi-jeong (18)
123	10 Jun 2012	Suntory Ladies Open	Kim Hyo-joo (am) (1)
124	17 Jun 2012	Nichirei Ladies	Shin Hyun-ju (6)
125	1 Jul 2012	Nichi-Iko Women's Open	Jeon Mi-jeong (19)
126	19 Aug 2012	CAT Ladies	Jeon Mi-jeong (20)
127	26 Aug 2012	Nitori Ladies	Ahn Sun-ju (10)
128	2 Sep 2012	Golf 5 Ladies	Ahn Sun-ju (11)
129	21 Oct 2012	Masters GC Ladies	Kim So-hee (2)
130	28 Oct 2012	Hisako Higuchi – Morinaga Weider Ladies	Jeon Mi-jeong (21)
131	11 Nov 2012	Ito En Ladies	Lee Bo-mee (2)
132	25 Nov 2012	**Japan LPGA Tour Championship Ricoh Cup**	Lee Bo-mee (3)
133	17 Mar 2013	Yokohama Tire Golf Tournament PRGR Ladies Cup	Jeon Mi-jeong (22)
134	14 Apr 2013	Studio Alice Women's Open	Kim Na-ri (2)
135	7 Jul 2013	Nichi-Iko Women's Open Golf Tournament	Kim Young (1)
136	11 Aug 2013	Meiji Cup	Na Da-ye (1)
137	25 Aug 2013	CAT Ladies	Ahn Sun-ju (12)
138	1 Sep 2013	Nitori Ladies Golf Tournament	Ahn Sun-ju (13)
139	15 Sep 2013	**Japan LPGA Championship Konica Minolta Cup**	Lee Bo-mee (4)
140	29 Sep 2013	Miyagi TV Cup Dunlop Women's Open Golf Tournament	Lee Na-ri (1)
141	13 Oct 2013	Stanley Ladies Golf Tournament	Kang Soo-yun (1)
142	20 Oct 2013	Fujitsu Ladies	Lee Na-ri (2)
143	3 Nov 2013	Hisako Higuchi – Morinaga Weider Ladies	Lee Bo-mee (5)
144	6 Apr 2014	Yamaha Ladies Open Katsuragi	Ahn Sun-ju (14)
145	13 Apr 2014	Studio Alice Women's Open	Esther Lee (1)
146	18 May 2014	Hoken no Madoguchi Ladies	Lee Bo-mee (6)
147	25 May 2014	Chukyo TV Bridgestone Ladies Open	Ahn Sun-ju (15)
148	15 Jun 2014	Suntory Ladies Open	Ahn Sun-ju (16)
149	22 Jun 2014	Nichirei Ladies	Jiyai Shin (6)
150	6 Jul 2014	Nichiiko Women's Open Golf Tournament	Jung Yeon-ju (1)
151	27 Jul 2014	Century 21 Ladies Golf Tournament	Lee Bo-mee (7)
152	10 Aug 2014	Meiji Cup	Jiyai Shin (7)
153	17 Aug 2014	NEC Karuizawa 72 Golf Tournament	Lee Bo-mee (8)
154	31 Aug 2014	Nitori Ladies Golf Tournament	Jiyai Shin (8)
155	21 Sep 2014	Munsingwear Ladies Tokai Classic	Jiyai Shin (9)
156	12 Oct 2014	Stanley Ladies Golf Tournament	Ahn Sun-ju (17)
157	19 Oct 2014	Fujitsu Ladies	Ahn Sun-ju (18)
158	9 Nov 2014	Mizuno Classic	Lee Mi-hyang (1)
159	15 Mar 2015	Yokohama Tire Golf Tournament PRGR Ladies Cup	Lee Ji-hee (18)
160	3 May 2015	Cyber Agent Ladies Golf Tournament	Jiyai Shin (10)
161	10 May 2015	**World Ladies Championship Salonpas Cup**	Chun In-gee (1)
162	17 May 2015	Hoken no Madoguchi Ladies	Lee Bo-mee (9)
163	21 Jun 2015	Nichirei Ladies	Jiyai Shin (11)
164	28 Jun 2015	Earth Mondahmin Cup	Lee Bo-mee (10)
165	26 Jul 2015	Century 21 Ladies Golf Tournament	Ahn Sun-ju (19)
166	30 Aug 2015	Nitori Ladies Golf Tournament	Lee Bo-mee (11)
167	6 Sep 2015	Golf 5 Ladies Professional Golf Tournament	Lee Bo-mee (12)
168	20 Sep 2015	Munsingwear Ladies Tokai Classic	Kim Ha-neul (1)
169	4 Oct 2015	**Japan Women's Open Golf Championship**	Chun In-gee (2)
170	11 Oct 2015	Stanley Ladies Golf Tournament	Lee Bo-mee (13)
171	25 Oct 2015	Nobuta Group Masters GC Ladies	Lee Ji-hee (19)
172	8 Nov 2015	Toto Japan Classic	Ahn Sun-ju (20)
173	15 Nov 2015	Ito En Ladies Golf Tournament	Lee Bo-mee (14)
174	22 Nov 2015	Daio Paper Elleair Ladies Open	Lee Bo-mee (15)
175	29 Nov 2015	**Japan LPGA Tour Championship Ricoh Cup**	Jiyai Shin (12)
176	13 Mar 2016	Yokohama Tire Golf Tournament PRGR Ladies Cup	Lee Bo-mee (16)
177	27 Mar 2016	AXA Ladies Golf Tournament in Miyazaki	Kim Ha-neul (2)
178	3 Apr 2016	Yamaha Ladies Open Katsuragi	Lee Ji-hee (20)
179	15 May 2016	Hoken no Madoguchi Ladies	Jiyai Shin (13)
180	12 Jun 2016	Suntory Ladies Open Golf Tournament	Kang Soo-yun (2)
181	19 Jun 2016	Nichirei Ladies	Jiyai Shin (14)
182	26 Jun 2016	Earth Mondahmin Cup	Lee Bo-mee (17)
183	17 Jul 2016	Samantha Thavasa Girls Collection Ladies Tournament	Jeon Mi-jeong (23)
184	24 Jul 2016	Century 21 Ladies Golf Tournament	Ahn Sun-ju (21)
185	7 Aug 2016	Meiji Cup	Lee Bo-mee (18)
186	21 Aug 2016	CAT Ladies	Lee Bo-mee (19)
187	25 Sep 2016	Miyagi TV Cup Dunlop Women's Open Golf Tournament	Lee Ji-hee (21)
188	9 Oct 2016	Stanley Ladies Golf Tournament	Ahn Sun-ju (22)
189	23 Oct 2016	Nobuta Group Masters GC Ladies	Jeon Mi-jeong (24)
190	30 Oct 2016	Hisako Higuchi Mitsubishi Electric Ladies Golf Tournament	Jiyai Shin (15)
191	13 Nov 2016	Ito En Ladies Golf Tournament	Lee Bo-mee (20)
192	27 Nov 2016	**Japan LPGA Tour Championship Ricoh Cup**	Kim Ha-neul (3)
193	5 Mar 2017	Daikin Orchid Ladies Golf Tournament	Ahn Sun-ju (23)
194	12 Mar 2017	Yokohama Tire Golf Tournament PRGR Ladies Cup	Jeon Mi-jeong (25)
195	2 Apr 2017	Yamaha Ladies Open Katsuragi	Lee Min-young (1)
196	30 Apr 2017	Cyber Agent Ladies Golf Tournament	Kim Ha-neul (4)
197	7 May 2017	**World Ladies Championship Salonpas Cup**	Kim Ha-neul (5)
198	28 May 2017	Resort Trust Ladies	Kang Soo-yun (3)
199	11 Jun 2017	Suntory Ladies Open Golf Tournament	Kim Ha-neul (6)
200	9 Jul 2017	Nipponham Ladies Classic	Lee Min-young (2)
201	16 Jul 2017	Samantha Thavasa Girls Collection Ladies Tournament	Kim Hae-rym (1)
202	20 Aug 2017	CAT Ladies	Lee Bo-mee (21)
203	27 Aug 2017	Nitori Ladies Golf Tournament	Jiyai Shin (16)
204	10 Sep 2017	**Japan LPGA Championship Konica Minolta Cup**	Lee Ji-hee (22)
205	19 Nov 2017	Daio Paper Elleair Ladies Open	Jiyai Shin (17)
206	4 Mar 2018	Daikin Orchid Ladies Golf Tournament	Lee Min-young (3)
207	11 Mar 2018	Yokohama Tire Golf Tournament PRGR Ladies Cup	Ahn Sun-ju (24)
208	1 Apr 2018	Yamaha Ladies Open Katsuragi	Ahn Sun-ju (25)
209	6 May 2018	**World Ladies Championship Salonpas Cup**	Jiyai Shin (18)
210	20 May 2018	Chukyo TV Bridgestone Ladies Open	Bae Hee-kyung (1)
211	8 Jul 2018	Nipponham Ladies Classic	Ahn Sun-ju (26)
212	29 Jul 2018	Daito Kentaku Eheyanet Ladies	Hwang Ah-reum (2)
213	12 Aug 2018	NEC Karuizawa 72 Golf Tournament	Hwang Ah-reum (3)
214	26 Aug 2018	Nitori Ladies Golf Tournament	Ahn Sun-ju (27)
215	2 Sep 2018	Golf 5 Ladies Professional Golf Tournament	Jiyai Shin (19)
216	9 Sep 2018	**Japan LPGA Championship Konica Minolta Cup**	Jiyai Shin (20)
217	30 Sep 2018	**Japan Women's Open Golf Championship**	Ryu So-yeon (1)
218	21 Oct 2018	Nobuta Group Masters GC Ladies	Ahn Sun-ju (28)
219	11 Nov 2018	Ito En Ladies Golf Tournament	Hwang Ah-reum (4)
220	25 Nov 2018	**Japan LPGA Tour Championship Ricoh Cup**	Jiyai Shin (21)
221	14 Apr 2019	Studio Alice Women's Open	Jiyai Shin (22)
222	21 Apr 2019	KKT Cup Vantelin Ladies Open	Lee Ji-hee (23)
223	28 Apr 2019	Fujisankei Ladies Classic	Jiyai Shin (23)
224	19 May 2019	Hoken No Madoguchi Ladies	Lee Min-young (4)
225	30 Jun 2019	Earth Mondahmin Cup	Jiyai Shin (24)
226	11 Aug 2019	Hokkaido Meiji Cup	Bae Seon-woo (1)
227	8 Sep 2019	Golf 5 Ladies Pro Golf Tournament	Lee Min-young (5)
228	13 Oct 2019	Stanley Ladies Golf Tournament	Hwang Ah-reum (5)
229	1 Dec 2019	**Japan LPGA Tour Championship Ricoh Cup**	Bae Seon-woo (2)
230	18 Oct 2020	Fujitsu Ladies Golf Tournament	Jiyai Shin (25)
231	8 Nov 2020	Toto Japan Classic	Jiyai Shin (26)
232	20 Jun 2021	Nichirei Ladies	Jiyai Shin (27)
233	25 Jul 2021	Daito Kentaku Eheyanet Ladies	Jiyai Shin (28)
234	7 Aug 2022	Hokkaido Meiji Cup	Lee Min-young (6)
235	5 Mar 2023	Daikin Orchid Ladies Golf Tournament	Jiyai Shin (29)
236	25 Jun 2023	Earth Mondahmin Cup	Jiyai Shin (30)
237	29 Oct 2023	Hisako Higuchi Mitsubishi Electric Ladies Golf Tournament	Hana Lee (1)
238	5 May 2024	**World Ladies Championship Salonpas Cup**	Lee Hyo-song (1)
239	20 Oct 2024	Hokkaido Meiji Cup	Lee Min-young (7)
240	11 May 2025	**World Ladies Championship Salonpas Cup**	Jiyai Shin (31)
241	21 Jun 2025	Nichirei Ladies	Lee Min-young (8)

Events in bold are majors.
