= 2010 LPGA of Japan Tour =

The 2010 LPGA of Japan Tour was the 43rd season of the LPGA of Japan Tour, the professional golf tour for women operated by the Ladies Professional Golfers' Association of Japan. It consisted of 34 golf tournaments, all played in Japan.

Ahn Sun-ju won the Order of Merit and had the lowest scoring average. Sakura Yokomine finished most often (20 times) inside the top-10.

== Tournament results ==
Dates	Tournament	Location	Prize fund (JPY)	Winner
Mar 5–7	Daikin Orchid Ladies	Okinawa	80,000,000	(South Korea) Ahn Sun-ju (1)
Mar 12–14	Yokohama Tire PRGR Ladies Cup	Kōchi	80,000,000	(Taiwan) Wei Yun-jye (4)
Mar 19–21	T-Point Ladies	Kagoshima	70,000,000	(Japan) Rui Kitada (6)
Apr 2–4	Yamaha Ladies Open	Shizuoka	80,000,000	(Japan) Miho Koga (12)
Apr 9–11	Studio Alice Ladies Open	Hyogo	60,000,000	(Japan) Chie Arimura (7)
Apr 16–18	Nishijin Ladies Classic	Kumamoto	70,000,000	(South Korea) Inbee Park (1)
Apr 23–25	Fujisankei Ladies Classic	Shizuoka	80,000,000	(Japan) Mayu Hattori (2)
Apr 30 – May 2	CyberAgent Ladies	Chiba	70,000,000	(South Korea) Jiyai Shin (4)
May 6–9	**World Ladies Championship Salonpas Cup**	Ibaraki	120,000,000	(United States) Morgan Pressel (1)
May 14–16	Fundokin Ladies	Fukuoka	80,000,000	(Japan) Sakura Yokomine (16)
May 21–23	Chukyo TV Bridgestone Ladies Open	Aichi	70,000,000	(Japan) Yuri Fudoh (47)
May 28–30	Yonex Ladies	Niigata	60,000,000	(South Korea) Jeon Mi-jeong (14)
Jun 4–6	Resort Trust Ladies	Nagano	70,000,000	(Japan) Yoshimi Koda (1)
Jun 10–13	Suntory Ladies Open	Hyogo	100,000,000	(Japan) Akane Iijima (5)
Jun 18–20	Nichirei Ladies	Chiba	80,000,000	(South Korea) Jeon Mi-jeong (15)
Jul 2–4	Nichi-Iko Ladies Open	Toyama	60,000,000	(South Korea) Shin Hyun-ju (5)
Jul 9–11	Meiji Chocolate Cup	Hokkaido	90,000,000	(Japan) Yuri Fudoh (48)
Jul 16–18	Stanley Ladies	Shizuoka	90,000,000	(South Korea) Ahn Sun-ju (2) ^{*}
Aug 13–15	NEC Karuizawa 72	Nagano	70,000,000	(South Korea) Lee Ji-hee (13)
Aug 20–22	CAT Ladies	Kanagawa	60,000,000	(Japan) Akiko Fukushima (24)
Aug 27–29	Nitori Ladies	Hokkaido	80,000,000	(Japan) Nobuko Kizawa (1)
Sep 3–5	Golf5 Ladies	Gifu	60,000,000	(Japan) Akane Iijima (6)
Sep 9–12	**Japan LPGA Championship Konica Minolta Cup**	Nara	140,000,000	(Japan) Saiki Fujita (4)
Sep 17–19	Munsingwear Ladies Tokai Classic	Aichi	80,000,000	(South Korea) Jeon Mi-jeong (16)
Sep 24–26	Miyagi TV Cup Dunlop Ladies Open	Miyagi	70,000,000	(South Korea) Lim Eun-a (3)
Oct 1–4	**Japan Women's Open Golf Championship**	Ibaraki	140,000,000	(Japan) Mika Miyazato (1)
Oct 8–10	Sankyo Ladies Open	Gunma	110,000,000	(South Korea) Ahn Sun-ju (3)
Oct 15–17	Fujitsu Ladies	Chiba	80,000,000	(South Korea) Ahn Sun-ju (4)
Oct 22–24	Masters GC Ladies	Hyogo	123,000,000	(Japan) Sakura Yokomine (17)
Oct 29–31	Hisako Higuchi IDC Otsuka Kagu Ladies	Saitama	70,000,000	(Japan) Rikako Morita (1)
Nov 5–7	Mizuno Classic	Mie	108,000,000	(South Korea) Jiyai Shin (5)
Nov 12–14	Ito En Ladies	Chiba	90,000,000	(Japan) Miki Saiki (2)
Nov 19–21	Daio Paper Elleair Ladies Open	Ehime	100,000,000	(South Korea) Kim Na-ri (1)
Nov 25–28	**Japan LPGA Tour Championship Ricoh Cup**	Miyazaki	100,000,000	(South Korea) Inbee Park (2)
Dec 12	Hitachi 3Tours Championship	Chiba	57,000,000	JGTO Team

Events in bold are majors.

The Mizuno Classic is co-sanctioned with the LPGA Tour.

^{*} Ahn Sun-ju's victory at Stanley Ladies marks Korean players' 100th victory since Ku Ok-hee's victory at Kibun Ladies Classic in 1985. (See more detail in Korean players' victories on LPGA of Japan Tour).

== See also ==
- 2010 in golf
