= 2015 Evian Championship =

Golf tournament

Coordinates: 46.394°N 6.570°E

Tournament information
- Dates: 10–13 September 2015
- Location: Évian-les-Bains, France
- Course: Evian Resort Golf Club
- Tour(s): Ladies European Tour; LPGA Tour

Statistics
- Par: 71
- Length: 6,470 yards (5,920 m)
- Field: 120 players, 77 after cut
- Cut: 147 (+5)
- Prize fund: $3,250,000
- Winner's share: $487,500

Champion
- (New Zealand) Lydia Ko
- 268 (−16)

Location in France

The 2015 Evian Championship was played 10–13 September at the Evian Resort Golf Club in Évian-les-Bains, France. It was the 22nd Evian Championship (the first 19 played as the Evian Masters), and the third as a major championship on the LPGA Tour. The event was televised by Golf Channel and NBC Sports in the United States and Sky Sports in the United Kingdom. Lydia Ko won her first major championship, becoming the youngest major winner, at age 18, and shooting the lowest final round, 63, to win a major.

== Field ==
The field for the tournament is set at 120, and most earn exemptions based on past performance on the Ladies European Tour, the LPGA Tour, or with a high ranking in the Women's World Golf Rankings.

There are 12 exemption categories for the 2015 Evian Championship.

1. The top 40 in the Women's World Golf Rankings, as of 4 August 2015

- Baek Kyu-jung (4,12), Chella Choi (4,12), Chun In-gee (3), Paula Creamer (2,7,12), Shanshan Feng (4,5,7,12), Sandra Gal (12), Julieta Granada (12), Brooke Henderson (4), Jang Ha-na (7,12), Cristie Kerr (4,12), Kim Hyo-joo (2,4,7,12), Kim Sei-young (4,12), Ko Jin-young, Lydia Ko (4,5,7,12), Jessica Korda (12), Brittany Lang (12), Minjee Lee (4,12), Mirim Lee (4,12), Stacy Lewis (12), Brittany Lincicome (3,7,12), Azahara Muñoz (5,12), Anna Nordqvist (4,7,12), Inbee Park (2,3,4,7,12), Suzann Pettersen (2,4,6,7,12), Gerina Piller (12), Morgan Pressel (12), Ryu So-yeon (5,12), Lizette Salas (12), Jenny Shin (12), Angela Stanford (12), Lexi Thompson (4,7,12), Karrie Webb (2,7,12), Michelle Wie (12), Amy Yang (4,12)
- Ahn Sun-ju, Choi Na-yeon (4,7,12), Lee Bo-mee, Lee Jung-min, Teresa Lu, Jiyai Shin (2) did not play

2. Active past champions

- Laura Davies, Natalie Gulbis, Juli Inkster (12), Ai Miyazato (12)

3. Winners of the 2015 majors (2015 ANA Inspiration, 2015 KPMG Women's PGA Championship, 2015 U.S. Women's Open, 2015 Women's British Open)

- All players already qualified in other categories.

4. LPGA Tour winners since 2014 Evian

- M. J. Hur (7,12), Christina Kim (12), Lee Mi-hyang (12), Lee-Anne Pace (5,12), Kris Tamulis (12)

5. Ladies European Tour (LET) winners since 2014 Evian

- Beth Allen (6), Rebecca Artis (6), Hannah Burke, Connie Chen, Ssu-chia Cheng, Nicole Broch Larsen, Xi Yu Lin (12), Gwladys Nocera (6), Su-Hyun Oh, Melissa Reid (6)
- Christel Boeljon (12) did not play

6. The top 5 on the LET Order of Merit, as of commitment date

7. Top 10 and ties from the 2014 Evian Championship

- Moriya Jutanugarn (12), Mariajo Uribe (12)

8. 2015 U.S. Women's Amateur champion

- Hannah O'Sullivan (a)

9. 2015 British Ladies Amateur champion

- Céline Boutier (a)

10. Evian invitations (four)

- Mathilda Cappeliez (a), Agathe Laisné (a), Leona Maguire (a), Albane Valenzuela (a)

11. Evian pre-qualifiers (two)

- Emily Kristine Pedersen, Klára Spilková

12. LPGA Tour money list, as of commitment date

- Marina Alex, Amy Anderson, Katie Burnett, Carlota Ciganda, Jacqui Concolino, Austin Ernst, Jodi Ewart Shadoff, Jaye Marie Green, Mina Harigae, Caroline Hedwall, María Hernández, Wei-Ling Hsu, Charley Hull, Karine Icher, Eun-Hee Ji, Tiffany Joh, Ariya Jutanugarn, Danielle Kang, Kim Kaufman, Sarah Kemp, In-Kyung Kim, SooBin Kim, Joanna Klatten, P.K. Kongkraphan, Candie Kung, Min Seo Kwak, Alison Lee, Ilhee Lee, Min Lee, Meena Lee, Pernilla Lindberg, Mo Martin, Caroline Masson, Catriona Matthew, Maria McBride, Sydnee Michaels, Mika Miyazato, Belén Mozo, Haru Nomura, Ryann O'Toole, Jane Park, Park Hee-young, Sadena Parks, Pornanong Phatlum, Beatriz Recari, Paula Reto, Alena Sharp, Kelly Shon, Sarah Jane Smith, Jennifer Song, Thidapa Suwannapura, Kelly Tan, Yani Tseng, Ayako Uehara, Alison Walshe, Sakura Yokomine, Yoo Sun-young
- Perrine Delacour, Lee Jee-young, Yueer Cindy Feng did not play

== Course ==
Hole	1	2	3	4	5	6	7	8	9	Out	10	11	12	13	14	15	16	17	18	In	Total
Par	4	3	4	4	3	4	5	3	5	35	4	4	4	5	3	5	3	4	4	36	71
Yards	399	165	355	414	188	384	545	189	481	3,120	417	353	406	499	221	527	155	331	441	3,350	6,470
Metres	365	151	325	379	172	351	498	173	440	2,853	381	323	372	456	202	482	142	303	403	3,063	5,916

== Round summaries ==
=== First round ===
Thursday, 10 September 2015

Place	Player	Score	To par
T1	(South Korea) Lee Mi-hyang	66	−5
T1	(United States) Lexi Thompson	66	−5
T3	(South Korea) Ji Eun-hee	67	−4
T3	(Thailand) Pornanong Phatlum	67	−4
T3	(United States) Gerina Piller	67	−4
T6	(United States) Beth Allen	68	−3
T6	(China) Shanshan Feng	68	−3
T6	(South Korea) Kim Sei-young	68	−3
T6	(Denmark) Nicole Broch Larsen	68	−3
T6	(Taiwan) Min Lee	68	−3
T6	(Australia) Minjee Lee	68	−3

=== Second round ===
Friday, 11 September 2015

Place	Player	Score	To par
1	(South Korea) Lee Mi-hyang	66-67=133	−9
2	(United States) Morgan Pressel	69-65=134	−8
3	(Denmark) Nicole Broch Larsen	68-67=135	−7
4	(China) Shanshan Feng	68-68=136	−6
T5	(South Korea) In-Kyung Kim	71-67=138	−4
T5	(New Zealand) Lydia Ko	69-69=138	−4
T5	(South Korea) Ilhee Lee	71-67=138	−4
T5	(Thailand) Pornanong Phatlum	67-71=138	−4
T5	(United States) Lexi Thompson	66-72=138	−4
T5	(South Korea) Amy Yang	72-66=138	−4

=== Third round ===
Saturday, 12 September 2015

Place	Player	Score	To par
1	(South Korea) Lee Mi-hyang	66-67-70=203	−10
2	(United States) Lexi Thompson	66-72-66=204	−9
T3	(New Zealand) Lydia Ko	69-69-67=205	−8
T3	(United States) Morgan Pressel	69-65-71=205	−8
T5	(China) Shanshan Feng	68-68-70=206	−7
T5	(Denmark) Nicole Broch Larsen	68-67-71=206	−7
T5	(South Korea) Amy Yang	72-66-68=206	−7
T8	(South Korea) Ji Eun-hee	67-73-67=207	−6
T8	(South Korea) Ilhee Lee	71-67-69=207	−6
T10	(Australia) Minjee Lee	68-72-68=208	−5
T10	(South Africa) Lee-Anne Pace	71-72-65=208	−5

=== Final round ===
Sunday, 13 September 2015

Lydia Ko birdied five holes on the back-nine and shot a round of 63 for a six-shot win over Lexi Thompson and her first career major championship. With the win Ko became the youngest winner of a LPGA major, and the youngest major champion in golf since Young Tom Morris won the 1868 Open Championship. Her closing round of 63 was a record lowest final round in the history of women's golf majors.

Place	Player	Score	To par	Money ($)
1	(New Zealand) Lydia Ko	69-69-67-63=268	−16	487,500
2	(United States) Lexi Thompson	66-72-66-70=274	−10	298,698
3	(China) Shanshan Feng	68-68-70-70=276	−8	216,684
T4	(South Korea) Ilhee Lee	71-67-69-70=277	−7	151,270
T4	(South Korea) Mi Hyang Lee	66-67-70-74=277	−7	151,270
T6	(United States) Alison Lee	70-70-72-66=278	−6	101,392
T6	(South Africa) Lee-Anne Pace	71-72-65-70=278	−6	101,392
T8	(South Korea) Eun-Hee Ji	67-73-67-72=279	−5	73,319
T8	(South Korea) Inbee Park	72-69-70-68=279	−5	73,319
T8	(South Korea) Amy Yang	72-66-68-73=279	−5	73,319

==== Scorecard ====
Final round

Hole	1	2	3	4	5	6	7	8	9	10	11	12	13	14	15	16	17	18
Par	4	3	4	4	3	4	5	3	5	4	4	4	5	3	5	3	4	4
(New Zealand) Ko	−8	−8	−9	−9	−9	−9	−10	−10	−11	−11	−12	−13	−13	−13	−14	−14	−15	−16
(United States) Thompson	−9	−10	−10	−10	−11	−12	−13	−12	−12	−12	−12	−12	−12	−10	−10	−10	−10	−10
(China) Feng	−7	−7	−6	−5	−5	−5	−5	−5	−5	−5	−5	−5	−5	−5	−6	−6	−7	−8
(South Korea) I. Lee	−7	−7	−7	−7	−7	−7	−7	−7	−7	−7	−7	−7	−8	−7	−8	−8	−9	−7
(South Korea) M.H. Lee	−10	−10	−8	−8	−8	−9	−9	−8	−7	−7	−7	−7	−8	−7	−7	−7	−7	−7

Cumulative tournament scores, relative to par

Birdie	Bogey	Double bogey
