= Rui Kitada =

Japanese professional golfer

Rui Kitada 北田 瑠衣
Personal information
- Nationality: Japan
- Born: 25 December 1981 (age 44) Fukuoka, Japan
- Height: 1.60 m (5 ft 3 in)

Career
- Sport: Golf
- Status: Professional
- Current tour: LPGA of Japan Tour
- Professional wins: 7

Number of wins by tour
- LPGA of Japan Tour: 6
- Other: 1

Best results in LPGA major championships
- Chevron Championship: DNP
- Women's PGA C'ship: DNP
- U.S. Women's Open: DNP
- Women's British Open: CUT: 2010

Rui Kitada (北田 瑠衣; born 25 December 1981) is a Japanese professional golfer on the LPGA of Japan Tour.

Kitada has won six times on the LPGA of Japan Tour between 2004 and 2010.

In February 2005, she teamed with Ai Miyazato to win the inaugural Women's World Cup of Golf in South Africa.

== Professional wins ==
=== LPGA of Japan Tour wins (6) ===
No.	Date	Tournament	Winning score	To par	Margin of victory	Runner(s)-up
1	9 May 2004	Nichirei Cup World Ladies	68-64-67-73=272	−16	2 strokes	(Japan) Yuri Fudoh
2	15 Aug 2004	NEC Karuizawa 72	69-66-67=202	−14	2 strokes	(Japan) Akiko Fukushima (Japan) Ai Miyazato
3	10 Oct 2004	Sankyo Ladies Open	71-69=140	−4	2 strokes	(Japan) Kasumi Fujii (Japan) Mikiyo Nishizuka (Japan) Junko Omote (Japan) Midori Yoneyama
4	11 Nov 2007	Ito En Ladies Golf Tournament	69-70-72=211	−5	Playoff	(Japan) Hiromi Mogi (Japan) Miki Saiki
5	31 Aug 2008	Yonex Ladies Golf Tournament	70-68-69=207	−9	3 strokes	(Japan) Erina Hara
6	21 Mar 2010	T-Point Ladies Golf Tournament	69-67-72=208	−8	5 strokes	(Japan) Yuko Mitsuka

=== Other wins (1) ===
- 2005 Women's World Cup of Golf (with Ai Miyazato)

== Team appearances ==
Professional

- World Cup (representing Japan): 2005 (winners)
