= Hinako Shibuno =

Japanese professional golfer (born 1998)

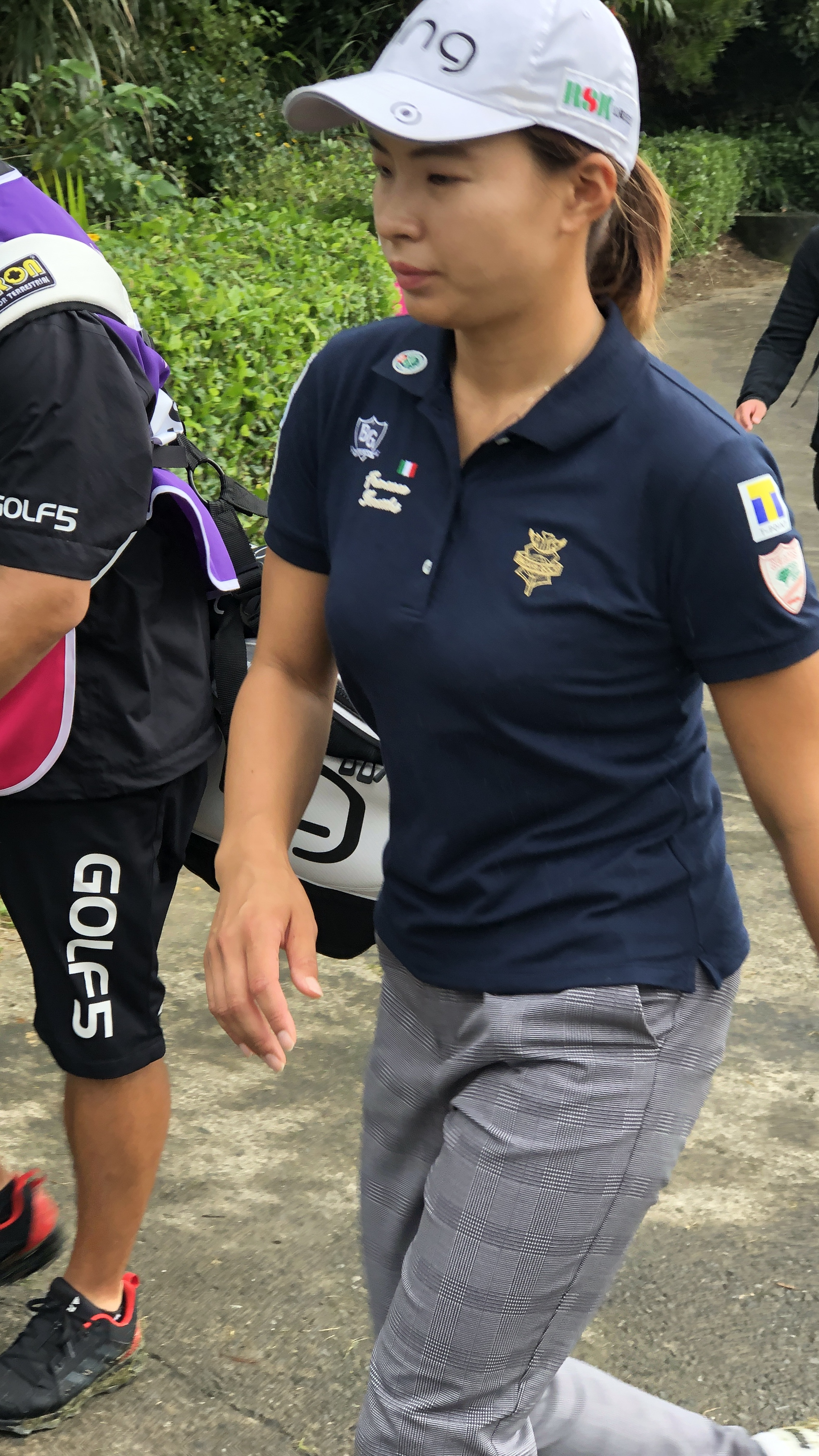
- Shibuno in October 2019

Personal information
- Full name: Hinako Shibuno
- Nicknames: Smiling Cinderella, Shibuko
- Nationality: Japan
- Born: 15 November 1998 (age 27) Okayama, Okayama, Japan
- Height: 1.67 m (5 ft 5 1/2 in)

Career
- Sport: Golf
- Turned professional: 2018
- Current tours: LPGA of Japan Tour; LPGA Tour
- Professional wins: 7

Number of wins by tour
- LPGA Tour: 1
- Ladies European Tour: 1
- LPGA of Japan Tour: 6

Best results in LPGA major championships (wins: 1)
- Chevron Championship: T4: 2022
- Women's PGA C'ship: T7: 2024
- U.S. Women's Open: 2nd: 2024
- Women's British Open: Won: 2019
- Evian Championship: T16: 2026

Achievements and awards
- LPGA of Japan Tour Player of the Year: 2019

Hinako Shibuno (渋野 日向子, Shibuno Hinako; born 15 November 1998) is a Japanese professional golfer who won the 2019 Women's British Open.

== Early years ==
Shibuno was born in Okayama, Japan on 15 November 1998. Her father was a discus thrower and her mother was a javelin thrower. She is the middle child of their three daughters.

She started playing golf and softball when she was a second grader. As a softball player, she was a pitcher and a converted left-handed hitter. As a golfer, she finished third in the 2010 Okayama Prefecture Junior Golf Championship (4th, 5th, and 6th grader division).

At Jōtō junior high school, she joined the school's baseball club as the only female player. However, after winning the 2011 Okayama Prefecture Junior Golf Championship (junior high school division), she decided to focus on golf, taking advice from her baseball coach.

In 2014, she was enrolled at Sakuyō High School where she continued to play golf for the school. In the same year, she won the Chūgoku Region Women's Amateur Championship. As a member of the school team, she won the team competition in the National High School Golf Championship in 2015.

== Professional career ==
In 2017, after graduating from the high school, she was qualified to take a final test to be a professional but failed.

In 2018, she mainly played in the step-up tour circuit. The only JLPGA competition she played in that year was the Earth Mondahmin Cup in June where she was qualified after a successful Monday qualifier. She scored a hole-in-one at the 9th hole of the first day of the competition and earned 6 million yen for the feat, despite missing the cut.

In July 2018, she passed the test and turned professional.

In May 2019, Shibuno won the World Ladies Championship Salonpas Cup, one of the four major golf tournaments for women on the LPGA of Japan Tour. In July 2019, she won the Shiseido Anessa Ladies Open after a playoff.

In August 2019, she won the AIG Women's British Open, which was her first LPGA Tour event and her first time outside of Japan. She is the second Japanese player to win a women's major championship, after Hisako Higuchi, who won the 1977 LPGA Championship, as well as the second player this decade to win in her major debut, after Kim Hyo-joo at the 2014 Evian Championship.

Shibuno earned her card for the 2022 LPGA Tour through qualifying school.

== Professional wins (7) ==
=== LPGA Tour wins (1) ===
Legend
Major championships (1)
Other LPGA Tour (0)

No.	Date	Tournament	Winning score	To par	Margin of victory	Runner-up
1	4 Aug 2019	**AIG Women's British Open**^{[1]}	66-69-67-68=270	−18	1 stroke	(United States) Lizette Salas

^{1} Co-sanctioned by the Ladies European Tour.

=== LPGA of Japan Tour wins (6) ===
No.	Date	Tournament	Winning score	To par	Margin of victory	Runner(s)-up
1	12 May 2019	**World Ladies Championship Salonpas Cup**	71-68-66-71=276	−12	1 stroke	(South Korea) Bae Seon-woo
2	7 Jul 2019	Shiseido Anessa Ladies Open	71-68-66-71=276	−12	Playoff	(South Korea) Lee Min-young
3	22 Sep 2019	Descente Ladies Tokai Classic	69-70-64=203	−13	2 strokes	(Japan) Mayu Hamada (South Korea) Lee Ji-hee (Taiwan) Teresa Lu (South Korea) Jiyai Shin (Japan) Momoko Ueda
4	24 Nov 2019	Daio Paper Elleair Ladies Open	67-70-66-66=269	−19	1 stroke	(Japan) Ai Suzuki
5	10 Oct 2021	Stanley Ladies Golf Tournament	71-67-68=206	−10	Playoff	(South Korea) Bae Seon-woo (Japan) Ayako Kimura (Japan) Miyu Sato
6	31 Oct 2021	Mitsubishi Electric/Hisako Higuchi Ladies Golf Tournament	69-68-70=207	−9	Playoff	(South Korea) Bae Seon-woo

Tournaments in bold denotes major tournaments in LPGA of Japan Tour.

== Major championships ==
=== Wins (1) ===
Year	Championship	54 holes	Winning score	Margin	Runner-up
2019	AIG Women's British Open	2 shot lead	−18 (66-69-67-68=270)	1 strokes	(United States) Lizette Salas

=== Results timeline ===
Tournament	2019	2020	2021	2022	2023	2024	2025	2026
Chevron Championship		T51	CUT	T4	T28	T50	T44	
U.S. Women's Open		4	CUT	CUT	CUT	2	T7	T17
Women's PGA Championship		T58	T40	WD	CUT	T7	CUT	T64
The Evian Championship		NT		CUT	T59	T51	CUT	T16
Women's British Open	1	CUT	T34	3	CUT	CUT	CUT	CUT

Win
Top 10
Did not play

CUT = missed the half-way cut
NT = no tournament
"T" = tied

=== Summary ===
Tournament	Wins	2nd	3rd	Top-5	Top-10	Top-25	Events	Cuts made
Chevron Championship	0	0	0	1	1	1	6	5
U.S. Women's Open	0	1	0	2	3	4	7	4
Women's PGA Championship	0	0	0	0	1	1	7	5
The Evian Championship	0	0	0	0	0	1	5	3
Women's British Open	1	0	1	2	2	2	8	3
Totals	1	1	1	5	7	9	33	20

- Most consecutive cuts made – 4 (2024 Chevron – 2024 Evian)
- Longest streak of top-10s – 2 (2024 U.S. Women's Open – 2024 Women's PGA)

== LPGA Tour career summary ==
Year	Tournaments played	Cuts made*	Wins	2nd	3rd	Top 10s	Best finish	Earnings ($)	Money list rank	Scoring average	Scoring rank
2019	3	3	1	0	0	1	1	n/a	n/a	69.45	n/a
2020	7	5	0	0	0	1	4	n/a	n/a	72.26	n/a
2021	8	6	0	0	0	0	T31	n/a	n/a	71.68	n/a
2022	23	13	0	1	1	5	2	1,011,830	27	71.37	72
2023	23	17	0	0	0	1	T7	263,069	87	71.36	65
2024	25	15	0	1	0	2	2	1,719,878	14	72.32	118
2025	23	10	0	0	0	1	T7	444,426	67	72.42	119
Totals^	94 (2022)	55 (2022)	1	2	1	9	1	3,439,203	145		

^ Official as of 2025 season
*Includes matchplay and other tournaments without a cut.

== World ranking ==
Position in Women's World Golf Rankings at the end of each calendar year.

Year	Ranking	Source
2018	563	
2019	11	
2020	13	
2021	37	
2022	42	
2023	95	
2024	66	
2025	133	

== Team appearances ==
Professional

- International Crown (representing Japan): 2023
