= Sakura Yokomine =

Japanese professional golfer

Sakura Yokomine 横峯さくら
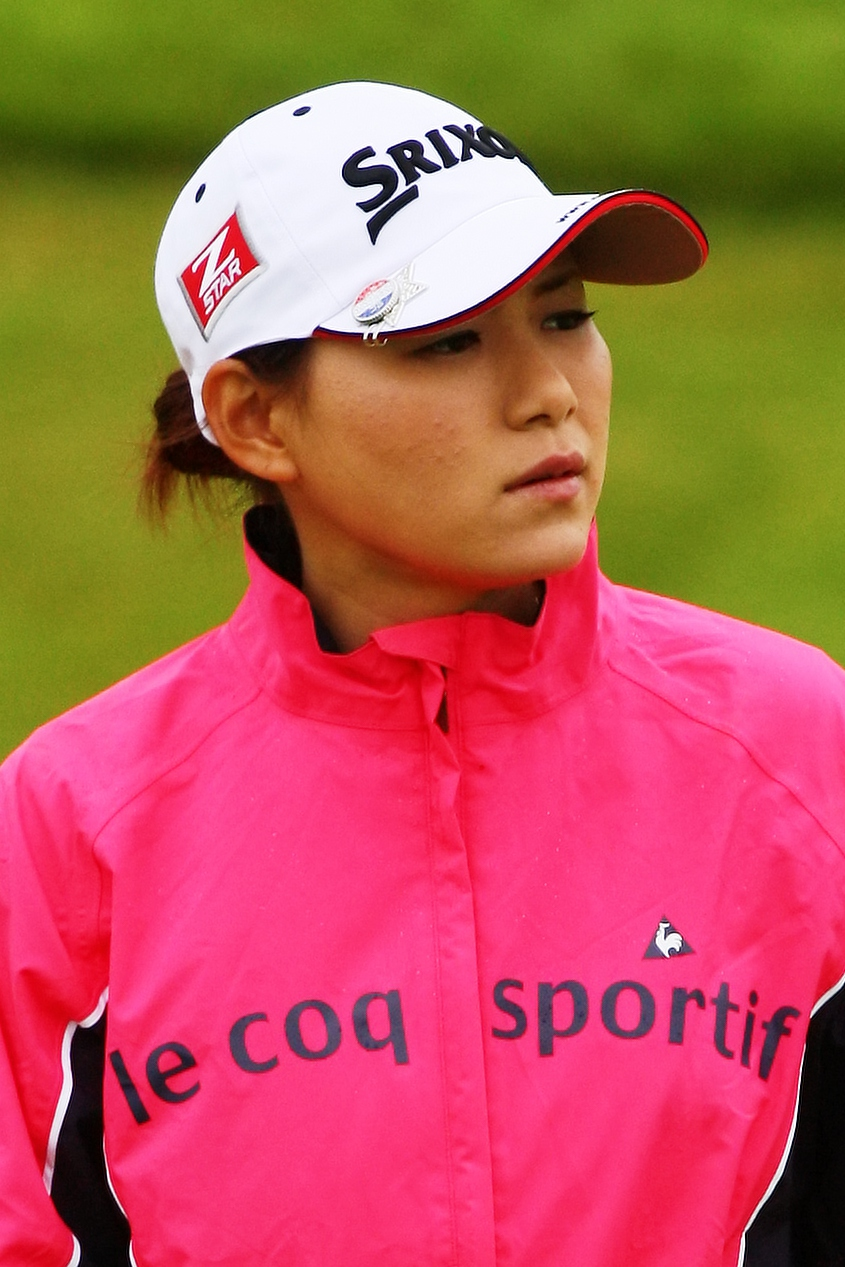
- Yokomine at the 2010 Women's British Open

Personal information
- Nationality: Japan
- Born: 13 December 1985 (age 40) Kanoya, Japan
- Height: 1.55 m (5 ft 1 in)
- Spouse: Yotaro Morikawa

Career
- Sport: Golf
- Turned professional: 2004
- Current tours: LPGA of Japan Tour; LPGA Tour (joined 2015)
- Professional wins: 25

Number of wins by tour
- LPGA of Japan Tour: 23
- Ladies Asian Golf Tour: 1
- Other: 1

Best results in LPGA major championships
- Chevron Championship: T19: 2008
- Women's PGA C'ship: T13: 2015
- U.S. Women's Open: T7: 2014
- Women's British Open: T16: 2006
- Evian Championship: T29: 2014

Achievements and awards
- LPGA of Japan Tour Player of the Year: 2009, 2013
- LPGA of Japan Tour leading money winner: 2009
- LPGA of Japan Tour Rookie of the Year: 2005
Medal record
Asian Games
Silver medal – second place	2002 Busan	Women's team

Sakura Yokomine (横峯さくら, Yokomine Sakura; born 13 December 1985 in Kanoya, Kagoshima) is a Japanese professional golfer.

== Career ==
She is one of the leading players on the LPGA of Japan Tour and was in the top twenty of the February 2006 debut edition of the Women's World Golf Rankings. She finished T-11 at the LPGA Final Qualifying Tournament to earn her tour card for 2015.

Yokomine has endorsement deals with Epson, Srixon, Asahi Soft Drinks, Le Coq Sportif, ANA and Sato.

== Professional wins ==
=== LPGA of Japan Tour (23) ===
No.	Date	Tournament	Winning score	To par	Margin of victory	Runner(s)-up
1	17 Apr 2005	Life Card Ladies	73-71-71=215	−1	1 stroke	(Taiwan) Julie Lu
2	25 Sep 2005	Miyagi TV Cup Dunlop Ladies Open	70-72-71=213	−3	Playoff	(South Korea) Jeon Mi-jeong
3	18 Jun 2006	Nichirei Ladies	65-72-73=210	−6	1 stroke	(South Korea) Lee Ji-hee
4	2 Jul 2006	Belluna Ladies Cup	70-64-67=201	−15	5 strokes	(Japan) Yui Kawahara (Japan) Namika Omata
5	26 Nov 2006	**Japan LPGA Tour Championship Ricoh Cup**	73-67-70-67=277	−11	7 strokes	(South Korea) Lee Jeong-eun (Japan) Ai Miyazato (Japan) Shinobu Moromizato
6	20 May 2007	Chukyo TV Bridgestone Ladies Open	70-69-70=209	−7	1 stroke	(Japan) Yukari Baba (Japan) Yuko Mitsuka (Japan) Mie Nakata
7	19 Aug 2007	New Caterpillar Mitsubishi Ladies	67-67-72=206	−13	1 stroke	(Japan) Shiho Oyama
8	25 Sep 2007	Fujitsu Ladies	72-66-69=207	−9	Playoff	(Japan) Momoko Ueda
9	23 Nov 2008	Daio Paper Elleair Ladies Open	71-68-66=205	−11	4 strokes	(Japan) Midori Yoneyama
10	12 Apr 2009	Studio Alice Ladies Open	71-73-68=212	−4	Playoff	(South Korea) Jeon Mi-jeong
11	31 May 2009	Kosaido Ladies Golf Cup	68-64-71=203	−13	2 strokes	(Japan) Chie Arimura
12	21 Jun 2009	Nichirei PGM Ladies	69-67=136	−8	2 strokes	(Japan) Chie Arimura
13	20 Sep 2009	Munsingwear Ladies Tokai Classic	66-65-68=199	−17	1 stroke	(Japan) Yuri Fudoh
4	15 Nov 2009	Itoen Ladies	67-70-69=206	−10	4 strokes	(Japan) Ayako Uehara
15	29 Nov 2009	**Japan LPGA Tour Championship Ricoh Cup**	69-71-73-69=282	−6	1 stroke	(Japan) Mayu Hattori (Japan) Akane Iijima (South Korea) Lee Ji-hee (Japan) Shinobu Moromizato
16	15 May 2010	Fundokin Ladies	69-70-68=207	−9	1 stroke	(South Korea) Shin Hyun-ju
17	24 Oct 2010	Masters GC Ladies	71-67-68=206	−10	1 stroke	(Japan) Yukari Baba
18	5 Jun 2011	Resort Trust Ladies	70-68-68=216	−10	1 stroke	(South Korea) Hwang Ah-reum (Japan) Rui Kitada (Japan) Satsuki Oshiro
19	5 May 2013	Cyber Agent Ladies	68-68-70=206	−10	2 strokes	(Japan) Natsuka Hori (South Korea) Jeon Mi-jeong (Japan) Yuki Sakurai (Japan) Maiko Wakabayashi
20	2 Sep 2013	Munsingwear Ladies Tokai Classic	68-66-67=201	−15	2 strokes	(Japan) Asako Fujimoto (South Korea) Lee Ji-hee (South Korea) Na Da-ye
21	27 Oct 2013	Nobuta Group Masters GC Ladies	70-63-71=204	−12	3 strokes	(South Korea) Ahn Sun-ju
22	17 Nov 2013	Itoen Ladies	70-68-68=206	−10	1 stroke	(Japan) Fumiko Yoshida
23	23 Nov 2014	Daio Paper Elleair Ladies Open	69-68-65-68=270	−18	1 stroke	(Chinese Taipei) Teresa Lu (Japan) Rikako Morita (Japan) Ai Suzuki

Tournaments in bold denotes major tournaments in LPGA of Japan Tour.

=== Ladies Asian Golf Tour ===
No.	Date	Tournament	Winning score	To par	Margin of victory	Runner(s)-up
1	26 Feb 2011	Yumeya Championship	67-67-74=208	−8	1 stroke	(Japan) Rui Yokomine

=== Other ===
- 2006 Hitachi 3Tours Championship (with Shin Hyun-Ju, Wei Yun-Jye, Ai Miyazato, Akane Iijima)

== Results in LPGA majors ==
Results not in chronological order before 2019.

Tournament	2006	2007	2008	2009	2010	2011	2012	2013	2014	2015	2016	2017	2018	2019
Chevron Championship		T43	T19	T25	T27				T59	T41	CUT	T68		T39
U.S. Women's Open		T22	T51		T10	T27	T39		T7	T47	T38	CUT		CUT
Women's PGA Championship					T25					T13	CUT	CUT	T66	T60
The Evian Championship ^									T29	CUT	CUT		CUT	T52
Women's British Open	T16	CUT	T24		T31	CUT		CUT		T36	CUT		CUT	T24

Tournament	2020	2021	2022
Chevron Championship			CUT
U.S. Women's Open			
Women's PGA Championship			
The Evian Championship			
Women's British Open			

^ The Evian Championship was added as a major in 2013.

Top 10
Did not play

CUT = missed the half-way cut
T = tied

=== Summary ===
Tournament	Wins	2nd	3rd	Top-5	Top-10	Top-25	Events	Cuts made
Chevron Championship	0	0	0	0	0	2	10	8
U.S. Women's Open	0	0	0	0	2	3	10	8
Women's PGA Championship	0	0	0	0	0	2	6	4
The Evian Championship	0	0	0	0	0	0	5	2
Women's British Open	0	0	0	0	0	3	10	5
Totals	0	0	0	0	2	10	41	27

- Most consecutive cuts made – 9 (2008 ANA – 2011 U.S. Open)
- Longest streak of top-10s – 1 (twice)

== Team appearances ==
Professional

- Lexus Cup (representing Asia team): 2006 (winners)
- World Cup (representing Japan): 2006
- International Crown (representing Japan): 2014
