= Yuri Fudoh =

Japanese professional golfer (born 1976)

Yuri Fudoh 不動 裕理
Personal information
- Nationality: Japan
- Born: 14 October 1976 (age 50) Kumamoto, Japan
- Height: 1.56 m (5 ft 1 in)

Career
- Sport: Golf
- Turned professional: 1996
- Current tour: LPGA of Japan Tour
- Professional wins: 50

Number of wins by tour
- LPGA of Japan Tour: 50

Best results in LPGA major championships
- Chevron Championship: T15: 2006
- Women's PGA C'ship: T20: 2006
- U.S. Women's Open: T12: 2001
- du Maurier Classic: DNP
- Women's British Open: T3: 2008

Achievements and awards
- LPGA of Japan Tour Player of the Year: 2000, 2001, 2002, 2003, 2004, 2005
- LPGA of Japan Tour leading money winner: 2000, 2001, 2002, 2003, 2004, 2005
- LPGA of Japan Tour Rookie of the Year: 1998

Yuri Fudoh (不動 裕理, Fudō Yūri; born 14 October 1976 in Kumamoto) is a Japanese golfer. She was the leading money winner on the LPGA of Japan Tour (JLPGA) six times from 2000 to 2005. She became the first player on the JLPGA Tour to earn in excess of ¥100 million, a feat she accomplished in 2000, and achieved again in 2003, 2004 and 2005.

== Career ==
In 2003, Fudoh became the first player to win 10 tournaments in a year and she earned more prize money than the leading male player on the Japan Golf Tour. In 2004, Fudoh became the youngest player to earn permanent seeding on the Tour following her 30th career victory at the Golf 5 Ladies Open. In 2005 Fudoh became the first JLPGA Player to earn in excess of ¥800 million.

In 2005, she topped the money list for the sixth consecutive year following her second-place finish at the Ricoh JLPGA Tour Championship. In 2006, she became the youngest player on the JLPGA Tour to win 40 tournaments following her win at the Life Card Ladies Open. In 2008, she became the first player on the JLPGA Tour to break the billion-yen barrier in career winnings with her victory in the Meiji Chocolate Cup, and also took the lead at Sunningdale in the Women's British Open.

Fudoh has stated that her primary goal is to compete in Japan and she has no interest competing on the U.S. LPGA Tour full-time apart from the majors. She was fourth on the debut edition of the Women's World Golf Rankings, released in February 2006.

She currently has endorsement deals with Titleist, Ellesse and Nomura Asset Management.

== Awards and honors ==
- In 1998, she earned LPGA of Japan Tour Rookie of the Year honors.
- Fudoh won the LPGA of Japan Tour's money list and earned their Player of the Year honors six years consecutively: from 2000 to 2005.

== Professional wins (50) ==
=== LPGA of Japan Tour wins (50) ===
No.	Date	Tournament	Winning score	To par	Margin of victory	Runner(s)-up
1	14 Nov 1999	Itoen Ladies	68–71–68=207	−9	1 stroke	(Japan) Aki Nakano
2	14 May 2000	Vernal Cup RKB Ladies	70–72–70=212	−4	3 strokes	(Japan) Aki Takamura
3	4 Jun 2000	Resort Trust Ladies	66–71–68=205	−11	5 strokes	(Japan) Yuriko Ohtsuka
4	18 Jun 2000	APiTa Circle K Sunkus Ladies	71–73–69=213	−3	1 stroke	(Japan) Midori Yoneyama
5	13 Aug 2000	NEC Karuizawa 72	71–69–71=211	−5	Playoff	(Japan) Chieko Amanuma
6	17 Sep 2000	Yukijirushi Ladies Tokai Classic	74–68–70=212	−4	1 stroke	(South Korea) Lee Young-me (Japan) Midori Yoneyama
7	8 Oct 2000	Sankyo Ladies Open	69–71–66=206	−10	3 strokes	(Japan) Kasumi Fujii
8	4 Mar 2001	Daikin Orchid Ladies	73–71–69=213	−3	3 strokes	(Japan) Kasumi Fujii (South Korea) Ko Woo-soon (Japan) Tomoko Ueda
9	5 Aug 2001	Vernal Open	68–66–73=207	−9	3 strokes	(Japan) Hisako Ohgane
10	26 Aug 2001	Yonex Ladies	69–68–67=204	−12	1 stroke	(Taiwan) Tseng Hsiu-feng
11	14 Oct 2001	Fujitsu Ladies	68–67–68=203	−13	1 stroke	(Japan) Michie Ohba
12	12 May 2002	Nichirei Cup World Ladies	65–69–70–67=271	−17	3 strokes	(Australia) Karrie Webb
13	4 Aug 2002	Vernal Open	72–70–68=210	−6	5 strokes	(Japan) Chieko Amanuma (Taiwan) Julie Lu
14	1 Sep 2002	Yonex Ladies	64–69–68=201	−15	7 strokes	(Japan) Kaori Higo
15	17 Nov 2002	Itoen Ladies	65–71–68=204	−12	1 stroke	(Japan) Akiko Fukushima
16	9 Mar 2003	Daikin Orchid Ladies	72–67–69=208	−8	Playoff	(Japan) Aki Nakano
17	25 May 2003	Chukyo TV Bridgestone Ladies Open	65-68-74-207	−9	1 stroke	(Japan) Toshimi Kimura (South Korea) Ku Ok-hee
18	8 Jun 2008	Resort Trust Ladies	72–66–67=212	−11	7 strokes	(Japan) Kaori Higo (South Korea) Lee Ji-hee
19	20 Jul 2003	Stanley Ladies	70–70–68=208	−8	3 stroke	(South Korea) Ko Woo-soon (Japan) Mitsui Michiko (Japan) Fumiko Muraguchi (Japan) Mihoko Takahashi
20	24 Aug 2003	New Caterpillar Mitsubishi Ladies	67–68–73=208	−11	3 strokes	(Japan) Junko Omote
21	14 Sep 2003	**Japan LPGA Championship Konica Minolta Cup**	67–68–72–70=277	−11	4 strokes	(Japan) Miho Koga (Japan) Michie Ohba
22	21 Sep 2003	Munsingwear Ladies Tokai Classic	67–70–69=206	−10	1 stroke	(Japan) Kaori Harada
23	19 Oct 2003	Fujitsu Ladies	67–68–69=204	−12	2 strokes	(South Korea) Ku Ok-hee
24	16 Nov 2003	Itoen Ladies	70–69–74=213	−3	Playoff	(Japan) Junko Omote
25	30 Nov 2003	**Japan LPGA Tour Championship Ricoh Cup**	75–68–66–70=279	−9	5 strokes	(Japan) Akiko Fukushima (South Korea) Lee Ji-hee
26	18 Apr 2004	Saishunkan Ladies Hinokuni Open	76–68–73=217	+1	Playoff	(South Korea) Ko Woo-soon (Japan) Sakura Yokomine (a)
27	16 May 2004	Vernal Ladies	72–72–70=214	−2	1 stroke	(Japan) Toshimi Kimura
28	30 May 2004	Kosaido Ladies Golf Cup	69–68–69=206	−10	3 strokes	(Taiwan) Tseng Hsiu-feng
29	18 Jul 2004	Stanley Ladies	67–69–68=204	−12	1 stroke	(Japan) Hattori Michiko
30	25 Jul 2004	Golf5 Ladies	75–72–74=221	+2	3 strokes	(Taiwan) Wei Yun-jye
31	3 Oct 2004	**Japan Women's Open Golf Championship**	74–70–69–67=280	−8	11 strokes	(Japan) Kaori Higo (Japan) Sakura Yokomine
32	28 Nov 2004	**Japan LPGA Tour Championship Ricoh Cup**	68–76–71–71=286	−2	1 stroke	(Japan) Ai Miyazato (Japan) Michie Ohba
33	8 May 2005	Salonpas World Ladies	71–71–64–70=276	−12	Playoff	(Japan) Shiho Oyama
34	12 Jun 2005	Suntory Ladies Open	72–69–67–64=272	−16	2 strokes	(Japan) Michie Ohba
35	4 Sep 2005	Golf5 Ladies	72–69–64=205	−11	2 strokes	(Japan) Akane Iijima (South Korea) Shin Hyun-ju (Taiwan) Wei Yun-jye
36	11 Sep 2005	**Japan LPGA Championship Konica Minolta Cup**	74–67–71–66=278	−10	2 strokes	(Japan) Ai Miyazato
37	16 Oct 2005	Fujitsu Ladies	68–65–71=204	−12	3 strokes	(Japan) Sakura Yokomine
38	13 Nov 2005	Itoen Ladies	71–71–67=209	−7	2 strokes	(Japan) Yuko Saitoh (Japan) Hiroko Yamaguchi
39	12 Mar 2006	Accordia Golf Ladies	71–67–73=211	−5	1 stroke	(Japan) Michiko Hattori (Japan) Hiromi Mogi
40	16 Apr 2006	Life Card Ladies	68–70–70=208	−8	2 strokes	(Japan) Shiho Oyama
41	27 May 2007	Kosaido Ladies Golf Cup	70–68–68=206	−10	5 strokes	(Japan) Noriko Aso (South Korea) Jeon Mi-jeong (Japan) Shinobu Moromizato (Japan) Sakura Yokomine
42	26 Aug 2007	Yonex Ladies	65–70–69=204	−12	1 stroke	(Japan) Momoko Ueda
43	16 Mar 2008	Accordia Golf Ladies	70–70–65=205	−11	Playoff	(Taiwan) Wei Yun-jye
44	13 Jul 2008	Meiji Chocolate Cup	69–68–70=207	−9	1 stroke	(Japan) Chie Arimura (Japan) Saiki Fujita (South Korea) Shin Hyun-ju
45	21 Sep 2008	Munsingwear Ladies Tokai Classic	71–70–67=208	−8	Playoff	(Japan) Yayoi Arasaki (Japan) Momoko Ueda
46	19 Oct 2008	Fujitsu Ladies	69–68–66=203	−13	Playoff	(Japan) Yuko Mitsuka
47	23 May 2010	Chukyo TV Bridgestone Ladies Open	66–67–70=203	−13	2 strokes	(South Korea) Kim Na-ri
48	11 Jul 2010	Meiji Chocolate Cup	69–67–68=204	−12	1 stroke	(South Korea) Lee Ji-woo
49	17 Apr 2011	Nishijin Ladies Classic	70–69–72=211	−5	Playoff	(Japan) Yukari Baba (South Korea) Lee Ji-woo
50	1 May 2011	Cyber Agent Ladies	72–66–68=206	−10	3 strokes	(South Korea) Jiyai Shin

Tournaments in bold denotes major tournaments in LPGA of Japan Tour.

== Results in LPGA majors ==
Tournament	2001	2002	2003	2004	2005	2006	2007	2008	2009
Kraft Nabisco Championship	CUT	T45			T39	T15	T37		T36
LPGA Championship						T20			
U.S. Women's Open	T12	CUT	T20	CUT	CUT	T46			T57
Women's British Open					T16	T42		T3	T33

Tournament	2010	2011
Kraft Nabisco Championship		CUT
LPGA Championship		
U.S. Women's Open		
Women's British Open		CUT

Top 10
Did not play

CUT = missed the half-way cut
"T" tied

=== Summary ===
Tournament	Wins	2nd	3rd	Top-5	Top-10	Top-25	Events	Cuts made
Kraft Nabisco Championship	0	0	0	0	0	1	7	5
Women's PGA Championship	0	0	0	0	0	1	1	1
U.S. Women's Open	0	0	0	0	0	2	7	4
Women's British Open	0	0	1	1	1	2	5	4
Totals	0	0	1	1	1	6	20	14

- Most consecutive cuts made – 10 (2005 Women's British Open – 2009 Women's British Open)
- Longest streak of top-10s – 1

== LPGA Tour of Japan summary ==
Year	Wins	Earnings (¥)	Rank
1997	0	22,400,175	34
1998	0	40,027,445	10
1999	1	56,386,976	4
2000	6	120,443,924	1
2001	4	89,248,793	1
2002	4	95,690,917	1
2003	10	149,325,679	1
2004	7	142,774,000	1
2005	6	122,460,908	1
2006	2	46,010,000	15
2007	2	87,061,631	6
2008	4	91,857,367	5
2009	0	43,978,276	17
2010	2	69,701,733	7
2011	2	60,518,023	9
2012	0	45,283,900	16
2013	0	35,566,959	30
2014	0	17,190,725	52
2015	0	11,809,000	62
2016	0	1,074,000	127
2017	0	10,436,000	75
Career	50	1,359,246,431	1
