= Women's World Golf Rankings =

The Women's World Golf Rankings, also known for sponsorship reasons as the Rolex Rankings, were introduced in February 2006. They are sanctioned by 12 women's golf tours and the organisations behind them: Ladies Professional Golf Association (LPGA Tour), Ladies European Tour, Ladies Professional Golfers' Association of Japan (LPGA of Japan Tour), Korea Ladies Professional Golf Association (LPGA of Korea Tour), WPGA Tour of Australasia, Epson Tour, China Ladies Professional Golf Association Tour, the Ladies European Tour Access Series, Taiwan LPGA Tour, JLPGA Step Up Tour (JSU), KLPGA Dream Tour (KDT), and Thai LPGA Tour and also by The R&A, which administers the Women's British Open and the United States Golf Association which conducts the U.S. Women's Open.

In December 2025, the Annika Women's All Pro Tour would be added to the Rolex Rankings, starting in April 2026.

The idea of introducing a set of women's rankings similar to the Official World Golf Ranking was developed at the May 2004 World Congress of Women's Golf, and was first planned for 2005, but then put back to 2006.

== Calculation of the rankings ==
The rankings are based on performances on the eight major tours (LPGA, JLPGA, KLPGA, LET, ALPG, Epson Tour, LETAS, CLPGA) over a two-year period. Amateur players are eligible. The system for calculating the rankings is similar to that for the men's Official World Golf Ranking. Players receive points for each good finish on the relevant tours, with the number of points available in each event depending on the strength of the field, as determined by the competitors' existing rankings (when the rankings were introduced rankings were calculated for earlier periods; the first ever set showed notional changes since the previous week). The only exceptions are the five LPGA majors and all Epson Tour, CLPGA and LETAS events which have a fixed-point allocation, presently 100 points for the majors. Rankings are weighted as to the time elapsed over the two years, making the recent results more important.

=== Original formula ===
When the rankings were first introduced in February 2006, a player's ranking as calculated in the above description was divided by the number of events played, with a minimum required events of 15 over the previous two years. In addition, players were required to play in a minimum of 15 eligible events over the previous two-year period to be included in the rankings.

=== Formula revisions ===
On August 2, 2006, the Rolex Rankings Board and Technical Committee announced following its bi-annual meeting two changes to the ranking formula.

1. The elimination of the minimum event requirement. Players would no longer be required to participate in 15 qualifying events to be included in the rankings and could be included after playing in as few as one qualifying event. This change would also have the effect of permitting amateurs who had played well in one event to be ranked (e.g., Morgan Pressel, who finished second in the 2005 U.S. Women's Open, or Michelle Wie from age 13).
2. The introduction of a minimum divisor. Where previously a player's point total was divided by the number of events she played over the previous 104 weeks, now the player's point total would be divided by the greater of (i) the number of events played or (ii) 35. Thus, players with 35 or more events over the previous 104 weeks would continue to use the actual number of events played as the divisor, but players with fewer than 35 events would use 35 as the divisor.

Many commentators saw the latter change as directed at Michelle Wie, who at the time was ranked second in the world despite having competed in only 16 women's professional events in the two-year period. However, the chairman of the Rolex Rankings Technical Committee defended the change as one designed to make the women's rankings more comparable to the Official World Golf Ranking for men, which use a minimum divisor of 40 events.

On April 16, 2007, another modification in the formula was introduced. Instead of points being awarded on an accumulated 104-week rolling period, with the points awarded in the most recent 13-week period carrying a higher value, points began to be reduced in 91 equal decrements following week 13 for the remaining 91 weeks of the two-year Rolex Ranking period rather than the seven equal 13-week decrements previously used. This modification did not have an immediate impact on the rankings.

== Criticisms ==
When they were introduced the rankings attracted considerable criticism on two grounds. First, it was widely felt that members of the LPGA of Japan Tour were ranked too high, since few of them had competed successfully outside Japan. Second, the minimum of 15 events needed to qualify for a ranking was widely seen as having been selected purely to enable Michelle Wie to be highly ranked because she had played exactly that number in the preceding two years, while every other highly ranked player had played many more events. If the women's rankings used the same system used for the men's rankings – that is a minimum number of events of one but a minimum denominator of 40 to calculate the average points per tournament – Wie would have been just outside the top 10. But under the women's ranking system where only players who had played a minimum number of events were included, if the minimum number of events had been set higher than 15, Wie would not have been ranked at all.

The August 2006 revised formula addressed the second criticism. The technical committee that administers the rankings urged patience with regard to the first criticism, since the continuing "strength of the field" weighting of tournaments may correct the issue without any technical changes being made.

== Significance of the rankings ==
The rankings are used by each of the sponsoring tours to determine eligibility criteria for certain events. For example, 40 of the 144 places in the Women's British Open are currently awarded on the basis of the rankings—10 to LET members and 30 to LPGA members. Four of the 12 places in the European Solheim Cup team are allocated on the basis of the rankings. For the U.S. Solheim Cup team, the top two players on the rankings not already qualified make the team.

Since 2013, the rankings at the end of each LPGA Tour season in odd-numbered years have determined the eight countries that will compete in the following year's International Crown, a LPGA-sponsored team event scheduled in even-numbered years and first held in 2014. More specifically, the countries whose top four players have the highest cumulative rankings are invited to compete. The individual participants from each qualified country are determined by the rankings immediately prior to the ANA Inspiration (known before 2015 as the Kraft Nabisco Championship) in the year of the event.

== Current top ten ==
As of 16 November 2026

Rank	Change	Player	Country	Points
1	Steady	Nelly Korda	United States	12.05
2	Steady	Jeeno Thitikul	Thailand	10.31
3	Steady	Ryu Hae-ran	South Korea	9.07
4	Steady	Miyū Yamashita	Japan	8.02
5	Steady	Kim Hyo-joo	South Korea	7.33
6	Steady	Yin Ruoning	China	7.29
7	Steady	Lottie Woad	England	5.57
8	Steady	Charley Hull	England	5.45
9	Steady	Kim Sei-young	South Korea	5.13
10	Steady	Shiho Kuwaki	Japan	4.67

Change column indicates change in rank from previous week.

Notes

- On 12 January 2009, Annika Sörenstam, who was ranked No. 3 the previous week despite having announced her retirement effective at the end of the 2008 season, was removed from the rankings. No official explanation was given for her removal. Sörenstam later posted in her personal blog that she asked to be removed.
- On 10 May 2010, one week after announcing that she was retiring from golf, Lorena Ochoa also voluntarily removed herself from the rankings. Her last position in the rankings was No. 2 for the week of 3 May 2010.

== World number ones ==
^	Record
*	Current No. 1 player as of 16 November 2026

No.	Player	Country	Start date	End date	Weeks	Total weeks
1	Annika Sörenstam	Sweden	21 February 2006	22 April 2007	60	60
2	Lorena Ochoa	Mexico	23 April 2007	2 May 2010	158^	158
3	Jiyai Shin	South Korea	3 May 2010	20 June 2010	7	7
4	Ai Miyazato	Japan	21 June 2010	27 June 2010	1	1
5	Cristie Kerr	United States	28 June 2010	18 July 2010	3	3
	Ai Miyazato (2)	Japan	19 July 2010	25 July 2010	1	2
	Jiyai Shin (2)	South Korea	26 July 2010	15 August 2010	3	10
	Cristie Kerr (2)	United States	16 August 2010	22 August 2010	1	4
	Ai Miyazato (3)	Japan	23 August 2010	24 October 2010	9	11
	Cristie Kerr (3)	United States	25 October 2010	31 October 2010	1	5
	Jiyai Shin (3)	South Korea	1 November 2010	13 February 2011	15	25
6	Yani Tseng	Chinese Taipei	14 February 2011	17 March 2013	109	109
7	Stacy Lewis	United States	18 March 2013	14 April 2013	4	4
8	Inbee Park	South Korea	15 April 2013	1 June 2014	59	59
	Stacy Lewis (2)	United States	2 June 2014	26 October 2014	21	25
	Inbee Park (2)	South Korea	27 October 2014	1 February 2015	14	73
9	Lydia Ko	New Zealand	2 February 2015	14 June 2015	19	19
	Inbee Park (3)	South Korea	15 June 2015	25 October 2015	19	92
	Lydia Ko (2)	New Zealand	26 October 2015	11 June 2017	85	104
10	Ariya Jutanugarn	Thailand	12 June 2017	25 June 2017	2	2
11	Ryu So-yeon	South Korea	26 June 2017	5 November 2017	19	19
12	Park Sung-hyun	South Korea	6 November 2017	12 November 2017	1	1
13	Shanshan Feng	China	13 November 2017	22 April 2018	23	23
	Inbee Park (4)	South Korea	23 April 2018	29 July 2018	14	106
	Ariya Jutanugarn (2)	Thailand	30 July 2018	19 August 2018	3	5
	Park Sung-hyun (2)	South Korea	20 August 2018	28 October 2018	10	11
	Ariya Jutanugarn (3)	Thailand	29 October 2018	3 March 2019	18	23
	Park Sung-hyun (3)	South Korea	4 March 2019	7 April 2019	5	16
14	Ko Jin-young	South Korea	8 April 2019	30 June 2019	12	12
	Park Sung-hyun (4)	South Korea	1 July 2019	28 July 2019	4	20
	Ko Jin-young (2)	South Korea	29 July 2019	27 June 2021	100	112 (Note: The rankings were frozen due to the COVID-19 pandemic from 16 March 2020 to 18 May 2020. (8 weeks))
15	Nelly Korda	United States	28 June 2021	24 October 2021	17	17
	Ko Jin-young (3)	South Korea	25 October 2021	7 November 2021	2	114
	Nelly Korda (2)	United States	8 November 2021	30 January 2022	12	29
	Ko Jin-young (4)	South Korea	31 January 2022	30 October 2022	39	154
16	Jeeno Thitikul	Thailand	31 October 2022	13 November 2022	2	2
	Nelly Korda (3)	United States	14 November 2022	27 November 2022	2	31
	Lydia Ko (3)	New Zealand	28 November 2022	23 April 2023	21	125
	Nelly Korda (4)	United States	24 April 2023	21 May 2023	4	35
	Ko Jin-young (5)	South Korea	22 May 2023	30 July 2023	7	163^
	Nelly Korda (5)	United States	31 July 2023	13 August 2023	2	37
17	Lilia Vu	United States	14 August 2023	10 September 2023	4	4
18	Yin Ruoning	China	11 September 2023	24 September 2023	2	2
	Lilia Vu (2)	United States	25 September 2023	29 October 2023	5	9
	Yin Ruoning (2)	China	30 October 2023	12 November 2023	2	4
	Lilia Vu (3)	United States	13 November 2023	24 March 2024	19	28
	Nelly Korda (6)	United States	25 March 2024	3 August 2025	71	108
	Jeeno Thitikul (2)	Thailand	4 August 2025	26 April 2026	38	40
	Nelly Korda* (7)	United States	27 April 2026	Present	30	138

=== Total weeks at No. 1 ===
*	Current No. 1 player as of 16 November 2026

Rank	Player	Country	Weeks	Order	Majors
1	Ko Jin-young	South Korea	163 (Note: The rankings were frozen due to the COVID-19 pandemic from 16 March 2020 to 18 May 2020. (8 weeks))	14	2
2	Lorena Ochoa	Mexico	158	2	2
3	Nelly Korda*	United States	138	15	4
4	Lydia Ko	New Zealand	125	9	3
5	Yani Tseng	Chinese Taipei	109	6	5
6	Inbee Park	South Korea	106	8	7
7	Annika Sörenstam	Sweden	60	1	10
8	Jeeno Thitikul	Thailand	40	16	0
9	Lilia Vu	United States	28	17	2
10	Jiyai Shin	South Korea	25	3	2
10	Stacy Lewis	United States	25	7	2
12	Shanshan Feng	China	23	13	1
12	Ariya Jutanugarn	Thailand	23	10	2
14	Park Sung-hyun	South Korea	20	12	2
15	Ryu So-yeon	South Korea	19	11	2
16	Ai Miyazato	Japan	11	4	0
17	Cristie Kerr	United States	5	5	2
18	Yin Ruoning	China	4	18	1

=== Year end No. 1 ===
*	No. 1 player all year

Year	Player	Country
2006	Annika Sörenstam	Sweden
2007	Lorena Ochoa	Mexico
2008	Lorena Ochoa* (2)	Mexico
2009	Lorena Ochoa* (3)	Mexico
2010	Jiyai Shin	South Korea
2011	Yani Tseng	Chinese Taipei
2012	Yani Tseng* (2)	Chinese Taipei
2013	Inbee Park	South Korea
2014	Inbee Park (2)	South Korea
2015	Lydia Ko	New Zealand
2016	Lydia Ko* (2)	New Zealand
2017	Shanshan Feng	China
2018	Ariya Jutanugarn	Thailand
2019	Ko Jin-young	South Korea
2020	Ko Jin-young* (2)	South Korea
2021	Nelly Korda	United States
2022	Lydia Ko (3)	New Zealand
2023	Lilia Vu	United States
2024	Nelly Korda (2)	United States
2025	Jeeno Thitikul	Thailand

=== Weeks at No. 1 by country ===
*	Country with the current number one player as of 16 November 2026

Rank	Country	No. of players	No. of weeks	Players
1	South Korea	5	333 (Note: The rankings were frozen due to the COVID-19 pandemic from 16 March 2020 to 18 May 2020. (8 weeks))	Jiyai Shin, Inbee Park, Ryu So-yeon, Park Sung-hyun, Ko Jin-young
2	United States*	4	196	Cristie Kerr, Stacy Lewis, Nelly Korda, Lilia Vu
3	Mexico	1	158	Lorena Ochoa
4	New Zealand	1	125	Lydia Ko
5	Chinese Taipei	1	109	Yani Tseng
6	Thailand	2	63	Ariya Jutanugarn, Jeeno Thitikul
7	Sweden	1	60	Annika Sörenstam
8	China	2	27	Shanshan Feng, Yin Ruoning
9	Japan	1	11	Ai Miyazato

=== Players who have reached No. 1 without having won a major title ===
Players	Date of first No. 1 position	Eventual first major title
Lorena Ochoa	23 April 2007	2007 Women's British Open
Ai Miyazato	21 June 2010	none
Lydia Ko	2 February 2015	2015 Evian Championship
Jeeno Thitikul	31 October 2022	none

== Year-end world top 10 players ==
★ indicates player's highest year-end ranking

Year	No. 1	No. 2	No. 3	No. 4	No. 5	No. 6	No. 7	No. 8	No. 9	No. 10
2006	(Sweden) A. Sörenstam^{★}	(Mexico) L. Ochoa	(Australia) K. Webb	(United States) C. Kerr	(United States) J. Inkster^{★}	(Japan) A. Miyazato^{★}	(South Korea) J. Jang^{★}	(United States) P. Creamer	(Japan) S. Oyama^{★}	(United States) P. Hurst^{★}
2007	(Mexico) L. Ochoa^{★}	(Australia) K. Webb^{★}	(Norway) S. Pettersen	(Sweden) A. Sörenstam	(United States) P. Creamer	(United States) C. Kerr	(South Korea) J. Shin	(United States) J. Inkster	(South Korea) M.H. Kim^{★}	(South Korea) S.R. Pak^{★}
2008	(Mexico) L. Ochoa	(Chinese Taipei) Y. Tseng	(Sweden) A. Sörenstam	(United States) P. Creamer^{★}	(Norway) S. Pettersen	(South Korea) J. Shin	(United States) C. Kerr	(Sweden) H. Alfredsson^{★}	(United States) A. Stanford^{★}	(Australia) K. Webb
2009	(Mexico) L. Ochoa	(South Korea) J. Shin	(Norway) S. Pettersen	(United States) C. Kerr	(Chinese Taipei) Y. Tseng	(Sweden) A. Nordqvist^{★}	(United States) P. Creamer	(Japan) A. Miyazato	(United States) A. Stanford	(United States) M. Wie
2010	(South Korea) J. Shin^{★}	(United States) C. Kerr^{★}	(Norway) S. Pettersen	(South Korea) N.Y. Choi	(Chinese Taipei) Y. Tseng	(Japan) A. Miyazato	(South Korea) I.K. Kim^{★}	(South Korea) S.J. Ahn	(South Korea) S.H. Kim^{★}	(United States) M. Wie
2011	(Chinese Taipei) Y. Tseng^{★}	(Norway) S. Pettersen^{★}	(South Korea) N.Y. Choi	(United States) C. Kerr	(United States) P. Creamer	(South Korea) S.J. Ahn^{★}	(South Korea) J. Shin	(South Korea) I.K. Kim	(Japan) A. Miyazato	(United States) S. Lewis
2012	(Chinese Taipei) Y. Tseng	(South Korea) N.Y. Choi^{★}	(United States) S. Lewis^{★}	(South Korea) I. Park	(China) S. Feng	(Norway) S. Pettersen	(South Korea) S.Y. Ryu	(South Korea) J. Shin	(Japan) A. Miyazato	(Japan) M. Miyazato^{★}
2013	(South Korea) I. Park^{★}	(Norway) S. Pettersen	(United States) S. Lewis	(New Zealand) L. Ko	(South Korea) S.Y. Ryu	(China) S. Feng	(South Korea) N.Y. Choi	(Australia) K. Webb	(United States) L. Thompson	(South Korea) I.K. Kim
2014	(South Korea) I. Park	(New Zealand) L. Ko	(United States) S. Lewis	(Norway) S. Pettersen	(China) S. Feng	(United States) M. Wie^{★}	(South Korea) H.J. Kim^{★}	(South Korea) S.Y. Ryu	(Australia) K. Webb	(United States) L. Thompson
2015	(New Zealand) L. Ko^{★}	(South Korea) I. Park	(United States) S. Lewis	(United States) L. Thompson^{★}	(South Korea) S.Y. Ryu	(China) S. Feng	(South Korea) S.Y. Kim	(South Korea) A. Yang^{★}	(South Korea) H.J. Kim	(South Korea) I.G. Chun
2016	(New Zealand) L. Ko	(Thailand) A. Jutanugarn	(South Korea) I.G. Chun^{★}	(China) S. Feng	(United States) L. Thompson	(South Korea) S.Y. Kim	(South Korea) H.N. Jang^{★}	(Canada) B. Henderson	(South Korea) S.Y. Ryu	(South Korea) S.H. Park
2017	(China) S. Feng^{★}	(South Korea) S.H. Park^{★}	(South Korea) S.Y. Ryu^{★}	(United States) L. Thompson	(South Korea) I.G. Chun	(Thailand) A. Jutanugarn	(Sweden) A. Nordqvist	(South Korea) I.K. Kim	(New Zealand) L. Ko	(United States) C. Kerr
2018	(Thailand) A. Jutanugarn^{★}	(South Korea) S.H. Park	(South Korea) S.Y. Ryu	(South Korea) I. Park	(United States) L. Thompson	(Australia) M. Lee	(Japan) N. Hataoka	(England) G. Hall^{★}	(Canada) B. Henderson	(South Korea) J.Y. Ko
2019	(South Korea) J.Y. Ko^{★}	(South Korea) S.H. Park	(United States) N. Korda	(United States) D. Kang^{★}	(South Korea) S.Y. Kim	(Japan) N. Hataoka^{★}	(South Korea) J.E. Lee^{★}	(Canada) B. Henderson	(Australia) M. Lee	(United States) L. Thompson
2020	(South Korea) J.Y. Ko	(South Korea) S.Y. Kim^{★}	(South Korea) I. Park	(United States) N. Korda	(United States) D. Kang	(Canada) B. Henderson^{★}	(Japan) N. Hataoka	(Australia) M. Lee	(South Korea) H.J. Kim	(South Korea) S.H. Park
2021	(United States) N. Korda^{★}	(South Korea) J.Y. Ko	(New Zealand) L. Ko	(South Korea) S.Y. Kim	(South Korea) I. Park	(Japan) N. Hataoka	(Australia) M. Lee	(Philippines) Y. Saso^{★}	(South Korea) H.J. Kim	(Canada) B. Henderson
2022	(New Zealand) L. Ko	(United States) N. Korda	(Thailand) J. Thitikul	(Australia) M. Lee	(South Korea) J.Y. Ko	(United States) L. Thompson	(Canada) B. Henderson	(South Korea) I.G. Chun	(South Korea) H.J. Kim	(Japan) N. Hataoka
2023	(United States) L. Vu^{★}	(China) R. Yin^{★}	(France) C. Boutier^{★}	(Australia) M. Lee	(United States) N. Korda	(South Korea) J.Y. Ko	(South Korea) H.J. Kim	(England) C. Hull	(Thailand) J. Thitikul	(China) X. Lin^{★}
2024	(United States) N. Korda	(China) R. Yin	(New Zealand) L. Ko	(Thailand) J. Thitikul	(United States) L. Vu	(Australia) H. Green^{★}	(South Korea) H. Ryu^{★}	(Japan) A. Furue^{★}	(France) C. Boutier	(England) C. Hull
2025	(Thailand) J. Thitikul^{★}	(United States) N. Korda	(Australia) M. Lee^{★}	(Japan) M. Yamashita^{★}	(England) C. Hull^{★}	(New Zealand) L. Ko	(China) R. Yin	(South Korea) H.J. Kim	(Japan) M. Saigo^{★}	(South Korea) S.Y. Kim

== Historical rankings ==
Annika Sörenstam of Sweden topped the first set of rankings, which was released on Tuesday 21 February 2006. Paula Creamer (United States); Michelle Wie (United States); Yuri Fudoh (Japan); and Cristie Kerr (United States) took the other places in the top 5. The top one hundred players in the initial rankings came from the following countries:

- 25: South Korea
- 23: Japan
- 21: United States
- 6: Australia, Sweden
- 5: United Kingdom (England 3; Scotland 2)
- 4: Taiwan
- 2: France
- 1: Canada, Chile, Colombia, Denmark, Italy, Mexico, Norway, Philippines

Initial top ten 21 February 2006
Rank	Player	Country	Points
1	Annika Sörenstam	Sweden	18.47
2	Paula Creamer	United States	9.65
3	Michelle Wie	United States	9.24
4	Yuri Fudoh	Japan	7.37
5	Cristie Kerr	United States	6.94
6	Ai Miyazato	Japan	6.58
7	Lorena Ochoa	Mexico	6.10
8	Jeong Jang	South Korea	4.91
9	Hee-Won Han	South Korea	4.49
10	Juli Inkster	United States	4.11

Initial top ten after 2 August 2006 formula change 7 August 2006
Rank	Player	Country	Points
1	Annika Sörenstam	Sweden	17.41
2	Lorena Ochoa	Mexico	9.87
3	Karrie Webb	Australia	9.39
4	Paula Creamer	United States	8.13
5	Cristie Kerr	United States	8.04
6	Juli Inkster	United States	7.75
7	Michelle Wie	United States	6.83
8	Jeong Jang	South Korea	6.09
9	Yuri Fudoh	Japan	5.98
10	Ai Miyazato	Japan	5.79

=== Breakdown by nationality ===
A breakdown of the year-end top-100 by nationality.

Country	20 25	20 24	20 23	20 22	20 21	20 20	20 19	20 18	20 17	20 16	20 15	20 14	20 13	20 12	20 11	20 10	20 09	20 08	20 07	20 06
South Korea	32	30	32	31	30	35	40	39	41	40	39	39	41	38	37	36	35	31	32	26
Japan	18	16	21	20	15	12	14	11	10	10	11	14	17	18	22	22	20	21	23	24
United States	16	18	14	18	22	23	20	24	22	22	21	18	19	17	15	18	22	23	20	23
Thailand	5	8	6	5	5	3	3	4	3	3	2	1	3	1	1					
Australia	5	5	4	3	4	4	3	3	5	3	2	3	1	3	3	5	5	4	4	4
Sweden	4	4	4	4	3	2	1	2	2	1	2	3	2	5	4	3	4	7	4	6
China	4	3	2	1	3	3	3	2	2	2	2	2	1	1	2	1	2	2	1	
England	3	2	3	4	3	5	4	4	3	2	3	3	1	1	2	3	2	2	3	2
France	2	1	2	2	1	1	1		1	1	2	3	2	1	1	3			2	3
Germany	2	1	1	1	3	2	1	2	2	2	2	2	2	2	2		1			
Switzerland	1	2	1																	
Spain	1	1	2	1	1	2	2	2	2	3	2	3	3	3	2	2				
South Africa	1	1	1	2	1	1				1	1	1	1	1	1	1				
Canada	1	1	1	1	1	1	1	1	1	2	1									1
New Zealand	1	1	1	1	1	1	1	1	1	1	1	1	1	1						
Mexico	1	1	1	1	1	1	1	1		1							1	1	1	1
Denmark	1	1		1	2	2	2		1	2	1	1				1				
Russia	1	1																		
Belgium	1																			
Ireland		1	1	1	1															
India		1	1					1	1											
Chinese Taipei		1			1		2	2	2	2	3	2	3	2	4	3	3	4	3	3
Scotland			1	1						1	1	1	1	1	1	1	2	1	3	1
Netherlands			1			1	1	1			1			1	1					
Finland				1	1													1		
Slovenia				1																
Philippines					1	1														1
Norway									1	1	1	1	1	1	1	1	1	1	1	1
Paraguay											1	1		1					1	1
Colombia											1	1								1
Italy													1	2	1		1	1		1
Brazil																	1	1	1	
Wales																			1	
Chile																				1

== See also ==
- Official World Golf Ranking – for male professional golfers
  - List of World Number One male golfers
- World Amateur Golf Ranking – for male and female amateur golfers
