= Lee Bo-mee =

South Korean golfer

Lee Bo-mee 이보미
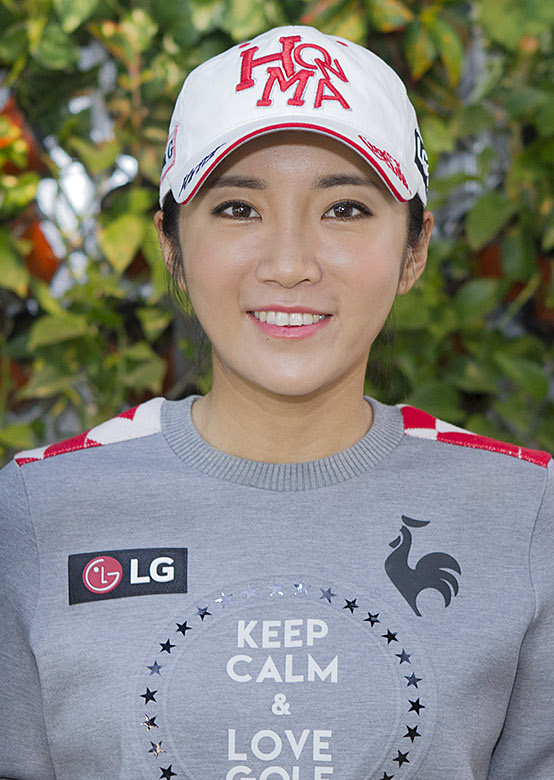
- Lee in November 2017

Personal information
- Nationality: South Korea
- Born: 21 August 1988 (age 38) Suwon, South Korea
- Height: 5 ft 3 in (1.60 m)
- Spouse: Lee Wan (m. 2019)

Career
- Sport: Golf
- Turned professional: 2007
- Current tours: LPGA of Japan Tour (joined 2011); LPGA of Korea Tour (joined 2007)
- Professional wins: 25

Number of wins by tour
- LPGA of Japan Tour: 21
- LPGA of Korea Tour: 4

Best results in LPGA major championships
- Chevron Championship: T10: 2016
- Women's PGA C'ship: DNP
- U.S. Women's Open: WD: 2011
- Women's British Open: DNP
- Evian Championship: DNP

Achievements and awards
- LPGA of Korea Tour leading money winner: 2010
- LPGA of Japan Tour Player of the Year: 2015, 2016
- LPGA of Japan Tour leading money winner: 2015, 2016

Lee Bo-mee (이보미; born 21 August 1988), also known as Bo-mee Lee, is a South Korean professional golfer currently playing on the LPGA of Japan Tour.

Lee played on the LPGA of Korea Tour, winning four events from 2009 to 2010. She has won 19 events on the LPGA of Japan Tour since 2012. She led the LPGA of Japan Tour money list in 2015 and 2016. She finished in solo second place at the 2012 Mizuno Classic, a co-sanctioned tournament on the LPGA Tour and LPGA of Japan Tours.

== Personal life ==
On 27 November 2018, the entertainment agency Story J Company, confirmed she is dating actor Lee Wan. The couple wed at a Catholic church with their family and friends in a private ceremony on 28 December 2019. Lee's sister-in-law is actress Kim Tae-hee.

== Professional wins (25) ==
=== LPGA of Japan Tour wins (21) ===
No.	Date	Tournament	Winning score	Margin of victory	Runner(s)-up
1	11 Mar 2012	Yokohama Tire PRGR Ladies Cup	−3 (73-71-69=213)	Playoff	(South Korea) Ahn Sun-ju
2	11 Nov 2012	Ito En Ladies	−12 (69-67-68=204)	Playoff	(Japan) Chie Arimura
3	25 Nov 2012	Japan LPGA Tour Championship Ricoh Cup	−13 (67-70-69-69=275)	2 strokes	(South Korea) Inbee Park
4	15 Sep 2013	Japan LPGA Championship Konica Minolta Cup	−11 (68-69-68=205)	Playoff	(Japan) Mamiko Higa
5	3 Nov 2013	Hisako Higuchi – Morinaga Weider Ladies	−15 (70-66-65=201)	5 strokes	(South Korea) Ahn Sun-ju
6	18 May 2014	Hoken No Madoguchi Ladies	−9 (73-65-69=207)	4 strokes	(China) Shanshan Feng (Japan) Mayu Hattori (South Korea) Jeon Mi-jeong (South Korea) Kang Soo-yun
7	27 Jul 2014	Century 21 Ladies Golf Tournament	−11 (69-66-70=205)	2 strokes	(South Korea) Ahn Sun-ju (Japan) Asako Fujimoto (Japan) Keiko Sasaki
8	17 Aug 2014	NEC Karuizawa 72 Golf Tournament	−13 (69-64-70=203)	Playoff	(Japan) Erika Kikuchi (Japan) Shiho Oyama
9	17 May 2015	Hoken No Madoguchi Ladies	−10 (68-72-66=206)	4 strokes	(Japan) Shiho Oyama
10	28 Jun 2015	Earth Mondahmin Cup	−14 (70-69-67-68=274)	Playoff	(South Korea) Lee Ji-hee
11	30 Aug 2015	Nitori Ladies Golf Tournament	−7 (69-69-71=209)	2 strokes	(Japan) Ayaka Watanabe
12	6 Sep 2015	Golf5 Ladies	−11 (67-68-70=205)	Playoff	(Japan) Misuzu Narita
13	11 Oct 2015	Stanley Ladies	−12 (67-69-32=168)	3 strokes	(Japan) Asako Fujimoto (Japan) Maiko Wakabayashi
14	15 Nov 2015	Ito En Ladies	−14 (65-68-69=202)	2 strokes	(Japan) Serena Aoki
15	22 Nov 2015	Daio Paper Elleair Ladies Open	−16 (70-68-65-69=272)	5 strokes	(Japan) Ai Suzuki (Japan) Ayaka Watanabe
16	13 Mar 2016	Yokohama Tire PRGR Ladies Cup	−8 (69-69-70=208)	Playoff	(Japan) Akane Iijima (Japan) Asuka Kashiwabara
17	26 Jun 2016	Earth Mondahmin Cup	−20 (66-68-67-67=268)	5 strokes	(South Korea) Bae Hee-kyung
18	7 Aug 2016	Meiji Cup	−10 (69-67-70=206)	2 strokes	(South Korea) Kim Ha-neul
19	21 Aug 2016	CAT Ladies	−9 (69-69-72=210)	Playoff	(South Korea) Jeon Mi-jeong (Japan) Kaori Ohe
20	13 Nov 2016	Ito En Ladies	−10 (69-68-69=206)	Playoff	(Japan) Ritsuko Ryu
21	20 Aug 2017	CAT Ladies	−12 (68-70-69=207)	3 strokes	(South Korea) Bae Hee-kyung (Japan) Erika Kikuchi

=== LPGA of Korea Tour wins (4) ===
No.	Date	Tournament	Winning score	Margin of victory	Runner-up
1	23 Aug 2009	Nefs Masterpiece	−12 (68-67-69=204)	Playoff	(South Korea) Inbee Park
2	9 Apr 2010	KYJ Golf Ladies Open	−3 (71-71-71=213)	4 strokes	(South Korea) Yoon Seul-a
3	12 Sep 2010	Daewoo Securities Classic	−10 (70-66-70=206)	1 stroke	(South Korea) Kim Char-young (South Korea) Kim Ha-neul (South Korea) Lee Jeong-eun (South Korea) Hee Kyung Seo (South Korea) Yang Soo-jin
4	24 Oct 2010	KB Star Tour	−19 (64-69-69-67=269)	1 stroke	(South Korea) Ryu So-yeon

== Results in LPGA majors ==
Results not in chronological order

Tournament	2010	2011	2012	2013	2014	2015	2016	2017
ANA Inspiration							T10	T66
Women's PGA Championship								
U.S. Women's Open	CUT	WD					CUT	
Women's British Open								
The Evian Championship ^								

^ The Evian Championship was added as a major in 2013.

Top 10
Did not play

CUT = missed the half-way cut
WD = withdrew
T = tied

== Team appearances ==
Professional

- The Queens (representing Korea): 2015 (playing captain)
