= Akiko Fukushima =

Japanese professional golfer (born 1973)

Akiko Fukushima 福嶋晃子
Personal information
- Nationality: Japan
- Born: 29 June 1973 (age 53) Kōnan-ku, Yokohama, Kanagawa Prefecture, Japan
- Height: 5 ft 5 in (1.65 m)

Career
- Sport: Golf
- Turned professional: 1992
- Former tours: LPGA of Japan Tour (joined 1992); LPGA Tour (1999-2004)
- Professional wins: 26

Number of wins by tour
- LPGA Tour: 2
- LPGA of Japan Tour: 24

Best results in LPGA major championships
- Chevron Championship: T2: 2001
- Women's PGA C'ship: T9: 2000
- U.S. Women's Open: T9: 1997
- du Maurier Classic: CUT: 1999
- Women's British Open: T41: 2003

Achievements and awards
- LPGA of Japan Tour Player of the Year: 1996, 1997
- LPGA of Japan Tour leading money winner: 1996, 1997
- LPGA of Japan Tour Rookie of the Year: 1993

Akiko Fukushima (Japanese: 福嶋晃子, born 29 June 1973) is a Japanese professional golfer. She played on the LPGA Tour and LPGA of Japan Tour.

== Career ==
In 1973, Fukushima was born. She is the daughter of Hisaaki Fukushima, a catcher who played professional baseball in Japan for 19 seasons.

Fukushima won 24 times on the LPGA of Japan Tour. She won twice on the LPGA Tour both in 1999.

== Professional wins (26) ==
=== LPGA of Japan Tour wins (24) ===
No.	Date	Tournament	Winning score	To par	Margin of victory	Runner(s)-up
1	6 Mar 1994	Daikin Orchid Ladies	71-70-72=213	−3	4 strokes	(Japan) Ayako Okamoto (Japan) Hiromi Takamura
2	30 Apr 1995	Satake Japan Classic Hiroshima Ladies Open	72-67-69=208	−8	3 strokes	(Sweden) Liselotte Neumann
3	14 May 1995	Yakult Ladies	70-67-37=174	−6	1 stroke	(Taiwan) Huang Bie-shyun
4	11 Aug 1996	NEC Karuizawa 72	71-63-72=206	−10	5 strokes	(Japan) Ayako Okamoto
5	13 Oct 1996	Fujitsu Ladies	69-68-68=205	−11	Playoff	(South Korea) Won Jae-sook
6	8 Jun 1997	Mitsubishi Electric Ladies	70-70-69=209	−10	2 strokes	(South Korea) Lee Young-me (Japan) Junko Yasui
7	3 Aug 1997	Golf5 Ladies	67-67-71=205	−11	1 stroke	(Japan) Chieko Nishida
8	14 Sep 1997	**Japan LPGA Championship Konica Cup**	72-69-70-72=283	−9	5 strokes	(Japan) Miyuki Shimabukuro
9	21 Sep 1997	Yukijirushi Ladies Tokai Classic	75-66-70=211	−5	3 strokes	(Japan) Ikuyo Shiotani
10	5 Oct 1997	Kosaido Ladies Golf Cup	69-72-70=211	−5	2 strokes	(Japan) Kyoko Ono
11	30 Nov 1997	**JLPGA Meiji Dairies Cup**	70-70-70-73=283	−5	2 strokes	(Japan) Yuko Motoyama
12	2 Aug 1998	Golf5 Ladies	69-70-69=208	−8	1 stroke	(South Korea) Ku Ok-hee
13	27 Sep 1998	Miyagi TV Cup Dunlop Ladies Open	69-68-71=208	−8	4 strokes	(South Korea) Han Hee-won (South Korea) Ku Ok-hee
14	23 Apr 2000	Nasu Ogawa Ladies	73-63-72=208	−8	2 strokes	(Japan) Aki Nakano
15	18 Aug 2002	NEC Karuizawa 72	68-68-66=202	−14	4 strokes	(South Korea) Ko Woo-soon (Japan) Masaki Maeda
16	17 Aug 2003	NEC Karuizawa 72	69-72-67=208	−8	4 strokes	(Japan) Ikuyo Shiotani
17	11 Jul 2004	Chateraise Queen's Cup	70-66-71=207	−9	10 strokes	(Japan) Midori Yoneyama
18	17 Sep 2006	Munsingwear Ladies Tokai Classic	69-67-66=202	−14	2 strokes	(South Korea) Lee Ji-hee
19	29 Oct 2006	Hisako Higuchi IDC Otsuka Kagu Ladies	67-70-70=207	−9	Playoff	(Japan) Sakura Yokomine
20	1 Jul 2007	Belluna Ladies Cup	69-66-71=206	−10	2 strokes	(South Korea) Lee Eun-hye
21	12 Aug 2007	NEC Karuizawa 72	66-66-67=199	−17	7 strokes	(Japan) Namika Omata
22	11 May 2008	**World Ladies Championship Salonpas Cup**	71-70-70-73=284	−4	Playoff	(South Korea) Jiyai Shin
23	20 Jul 2008	Stanley Ladies	69-67-67=203	−13	1 stroke	(Japan) Ayako Uehara
24	22 Aug 2010	CAT Ladies	66-70-69=205	−14	2 strokes	(Japan) Yukari Baba

Tournaments in bold denotes major tournaments in LPGA of Japan Tour.

=== LPGA Tour wins (2) ===
No.	Date	Tournament	Winning score	To par	Margin of victory	Runner(s)-up
1	23 May 1999	The Philips Invitational	64-67-65-71=267	−12	2 strokes	(Sweden) Charlotta Sörenstam
2	17 Oct 1999	AFLAC Champions	71-71-69-68=279	−9	1 stroke	(Sweden) Maria Hjorth (Australia) Karrie Webb
