= Hisako Higuchi Mitsubishi Electric Ladies Golf Tournament =

Golf tournament in Japan

The Hisako Higuchi Mitsubishi Electric Ladies Golf Tournament is an annual golf tournament for professional female golfers on LPGA of Japan Tour. It is usually played in October and in recent years at the Musashigaoka Golf Course, Hannō, Saitama. It was founded in 1983. The 2024 champion was Chisato Iwai, who broke the tournament record for the most under-par shots. The runner up was her sister, Akie Iwai.

== Winners ==
Year	Dates	Winner	Country	Score	To par
Hisako Higuchi Mitsubishi Electric Ladies Golf Tournament
2026	Oct 30 – Nov 1	Shuri Sakuma	Japan	201	−15
2025	Oct 31 – Nov 2	Kano Nakamura	Japan	202	−14
2024	Oct 25–27	Chisato Iwai	Japan	200	−16
2023	Oct 27–29	Hana Lee	South Korea	207	−9
Mitsubishi Electric/Hisako Higuchi Ladies Golf Tournament
2022	Oct 28–30	Kumiko Kaneda	Japan	207	−9
2021	Oct 29–31	Hinako Shibuno	Japan	207	−9
2020	Oct 30 – Nov 1	Yuna Nishimura	Japan	205	−11
2019	Nov 1–3	Ai Suzuki	Japan	202	−14
2018	Oct 26–28	Shoko Sasaki	Japan	204	−12
2017	Oct 27–29	Kana Nagai	Japan	137	−7
2016	Oct 28–30	Jiyai Shin	South Korea	207	−9
Hisako Higuchi Ponta Ladies
2015	Oct 30 – Nov 1	Ayaka Watanabe	Japan	205	−11
Hisako Higuchi Morinaga Ladies
2014	Oct 31 – Nov 2	Momoko Ueda	Japan	206	−10
Hisako Higuchi Morinaga Weider Ladies
2013	Nov 1–3	Lee Bo-mee	South Korea	201	−15
2012	Oct 26–28	Jeon Mi-jeong (3)	South Korea	204	−12
2011	Oct 28–30	Chie Arimura	Japan	209	−7
Hisako Higuchi IDC Otsuka Ladies
2010	Oct 29–31	Rikako Morita	Japan	133	−11
2009	Oct 30 – Nov 1	Jeon Mi-jeong (2)	South Korea	203	−13
2008	Oct 31 – Nov 2	Mayu Hattori	Japan	210	−6
2007	Oct 26–28	Jeon Mi-jeong	South Korea	210	−6
2006	Oct 27–29	Akiko Fukushima	Japan	207	−9
2005	Oct 28–30	Ai Miyazato	Japan	202	−14
Hisako Higuchi Hall of Fame Commemoration IDC Otsuka Ladies 2004
2004	Oct 29–31	Miho Koga	Japan	210	−6
Hisako Higuchi Classic
2003	Oct 24–26	Cancelled due to lack of operating funds			
2002	Oct 25–27	Kasumi Fujii	Japan	209	−7
Chako Higuchi Kibun Ladies Classic
2001	Oct 19–21	Chieko Amanuma	Japan	210	−6
2000	Oct 20–22	Ko Woo-soon (2)	South Korea	209	−10
Hisako Higuchi Kibun Ladies Classic
1999	Oct 22–24	Kumiko Hiyoshi (2)	Japan	211	−5
1998	Oct 23–25	Michiko Hattori	Japan	212	−4
1997	Oct 23–26	Annika Sörenstam	Sweden	287	−1
Kibun Ladies Classic
1996	Oct 18–20	Akane Oshiro	Japan	215	−4
1995	Oct 20–22	Hiromi Kobayashi	Japan	209	−7
1994	Apr 1–3	Ko Woo-soon	South Korea	221	−1
1993	Mar 26–28	Kumiko Hiyoshi	Japan	208	−8
1992	Mar 27–29	Lee Young-me	South Korea	221	−1
1991	Mar 29–31	Ikue Ota	Japan	217	+1
1990	Mar 23–25	Tu Ai-yu (2)	Taiwan	217	−5
1989	Mar 24–26	Holly Hartley	United States	215	−1
1988	Mar 25–27	Nayoko Yoshikawa	Japan	220	−2
1987	Mar 27–29	Chen Li-ying	Taiwan	215	−1
1986	Mar 28–30	Tu Ai-yu	Taiwan	214	−2
1985	Mar 29–31	Ku Ok-hee	South Korea	218	−4
1984	Mar 30 – Apr 1	Hisako Higuchi (2)	Japan	223	+1
1983	Apr 1–3	Hisako Higuchi	Japan	227	+5
