= NEC Karuizawa 72 =

Golf tournament

The NEC Karuizawa 72 is an annual golf tournament on the LPGA of Japan Tour. It was first played in 1987. The event is held in Nagano, currently at the Karuizawa 72 Golf North Course. The prize fund for 2025 is ¥100,000,000 with ¥18,000,000 going to the winner.

Tournament names through the years:

- 1987–1991 Karuizawa 72 Tokyu Ladies Open
- 1992–present NEC Karuizawa 72

== Winners ==
- 2026 Yuka Yasuda
- 2025 Asuka Kashiwabara
- 2024 Yui Kawamoto
- 2023 Nana Suganuma
- 2022 Chisato Iwai
- 2021 Sakura Koiwai
- 2020 Yuka Saso
- 2019 Lala Anai
- 2018 Hwang Ah-reum
- 2017 Mamiko Higa
- 2016 Ritsuko Ryu
- 2015 Teresa Lu
- 2014 Lee Bo-mee
- 2013 Misuzu Narita
- 2012 Yumiko Yoshida
- 2011 Ahn Sun-ju
- 2010 Lee Ji-hee
- 2009 Chie Arimura
- 2008 Erina Hara
- 2007 Akiko Fukushima
- 2006 Shiho Oyama
- 2005 Paula Creamer
- 2004 Rui Kitada
- 2003 Akiko Fukushima
- 2002 Akiko Fukushima
- 2001 Chieko Amanuma
- 2000 Yuri Fudoh
- 1999 Han Hee-won
- 1998 Yuka Irie
- 1997 Yuka Irie
- 1996 Akiko Fukushima
- 1995 Mayumi Hirase
- 1994 Mayumi Hirase
- 1993 Mitsuyo Hirata
- 1992 Mayumi Murai
- 1991 Ayako Okamoto
- 1990 Chikayo Yamazaki
- 1989 Dottie Mochrie
- 1988 Tammie Green
- 1987 Tatsuko Ohsako
