= Ladies Tokai Classic =

Tournament information
- Location: Mihama, Aichi
- Established: 1970
- Course: Shin Minami Aichi Country Club Mihama Course
- Par: 72
- Length: 6,502 yards (5,945 m)
- Tour: LPGA of Japan Tour
- Format: Stroke play
- Prize fund: ¥100 million
- Month played: September

Current champion
- (Japan) Shuri Sakuma

The Sumitomo Life Vitality Ladies Tokai Classic is an annual event on the LPGA of Japan Tour. It is usually played in September and in recent years at the Shin Minami Aichi Country Club Mihama Course, Mihama, Aichi. It was founded in 1970. The purse in 2022 was ¥100,000,000 with ¥18,000,000 going to the winner.

== Winners ==
Sumitomo Life Vitality Ladies Tokai Classic

- 2026 Shuri Sakuma - Japan
- 2025 Sora Kamiya - Japan
- 2024 Akie Iwai - Japan
- 2023 Akie Iwai - Japan
- 2022 Amiyu Ozeki – Japan
- 2021 Yuna Nishimura – Japan

Descente Ladies Tokai Classic

- 2020 Ayaka Furue – Japan
- 2019 Hinako Shibuno – Japan

Munsingwear Ladies Tokai Classic

- 2018 Kotono Kozuma – Japan
- 2017 Fumika Kawagishi – Japan
- 2016 Teresa Lu – Taiwan
- 2015 Kim Ha-neul – South Korea
- 2014 Jiyai Shin – South Korea
- 2013 Sakura Yokomine – Japan
- 2012 Natsu Nagai – Japan
- 2011 Mayu Hattori – Japan
- 2010 Jeon Mi-jeong – South Korea
- 2009 Sakura Yokomine – Japan
- 2008 Yuri Fudoh – Japan
- 2007 Zhang Na – China
- 2006 Akiko Fukushima – Japan
- 2005 Shiho Oyama – Japan
- 2004 Hiromi Motegi – Japan
- 2003 Yuri Fudoh – Japan
- 2002 Kasumi Fujii – Japan
- 2001 Fuki Kido – Japan

Yukijirushi Ladies Tokai Classic

- 2000 Yuri Fudoh – Japan
- 1999 Lee Young-me – South Korea
- 1998 Kaori Higo – Japan
- 1997 Akiko Fukushima – Japan
- 1996 Maki Maeda – Japan
- 1995 Fumiko Muraguchi – Japan
- 1994 Michiko Hattori – Japan
- 1993 Michiko Hattori – Japan
- 1992 Chieko Nishida – Japan
- 1991 Patti Rizzo – United States
- 1990 Shihomi Suzuki and Kikuko Shibata – Japan (tied)

Tokai Classic

- 1989 Ayako Okamoto – Japan
- 1988 Megumi Ishikawa – Japan
- 1987 Ku Ok-hee- South Korea
- 1986 Huang Bie-shyun – Taiwan
- 1985 Ritsu Imahori – Japan
- 1984 Satoko Sawada – Japan
- 1983 Wu Ming-yeh – Taiwan
- 1982 Ayako Okamoto – Japan
- 1981 Tatsuko Ohsako – Japan
- 1980 Hisako Higuchi – Japan
- 1979 Ayako Okamoto – Japan
- 1978 Tu Ai-yu – Taiwan
- 1977 Hisako Higuchi – Japan
- 1976 Hisako Higuchi – Japan
- 1975 Hisako Higuchi – Japan
- 1974 Tu Ai-yu – Taiwan
- 1973 Hisako Higuchi – Japan
- 1972 Hisako Higuchi – Japan
- 1971 Hisako Higuchi – Japan
- 1970 Sandra Palmer – United States

== See also ==
- Tokai Classic
