= Ahn Sun-ju =

South Korean professional golfer (born 1987)

Personal information
- Full name: Sun-ju Ahn
- Nickname: Big Mama
- Nationality: South Korea
- Born: 31 August 1987 (age 39) Gwangju, Gyeonggi-do, South Korea
- Height: 5 ft 3 in (1.60 m)
- Spouse: Kim Sung-ho

Career
- Sport: Golf
- Turned professional: 2006
- Current tour: LPGA of Japan Tour (joined 2010)
- Former tour: LPGA of Korea Tour (joined 2006)
- Professional wins: 35

Number of wins by tour
- LPGA Tour: 1
- LPGA of Japan Tour: 28
- LPGA of Korea Tour: 7

Best results in LPGA major championships
- Chevron Championship: CUT: 2008
- Women's PGA C'ship: DNP
- U.S. Women's Open: T13: 2009
- Women's British Open: T9: 2014
- Evian Championship: DNP

Achievements and awards
- LPGA of Japan Tour Player of the Year: 2010, 2011, 2014
- LPGA of Japan Tour leading money winner: 2010, 2011, 2014, 2018
- LPGA of Japan Tour Rookie of the Year: 2010

- Ahn Sun-ju
- Hangul: 안선주
- Hanja: 安宣柱
- RR: An Seonju
- MR: An Sŏnju

Ahn Sun-ju, or Sun-ju Ahn (Korean: 안선주, born 31 August 1987) is a South Korean professional golfer currently playing on the LPGA of Japan Tour. She led the LPGA of Japan Tour money list in 2010, 2011, 2014, and 2018.

== Professional wins (35) ==
=== LPGA Tour wins (1) ===
No.	Date	Tournament	Winning score	Margin of victory	Runners-up
1	8 Nov 2015	Toto Japan Classic^	−16 (68-65-67=200)	Playoff	(South Korea) Lee Ji-hee (United States) Angela Stanford

^ Co-sanctioned with the LPGA of Japan Tour

LPGA Tour playoff record (1–0)

No.	Year	Tournament	Opponents	Result
1	2015	Toto Japan Classic	(South Korea) Lee Ji-hee (United States) Angela Stanford	Won with birdie on first extra hole

=== LPGA of Korea Tour wins (7) ===
No.	Date	Tournament	Winning score	Margin of victory	Runner(s)-up
1	13 May 2006	KB Star Tour First Tourney in Yongin	−16 (65-66-69=200)	1 stroke	(South Korea) Na Yeon Choi
2	21 Apr 2007	KB Star Tour First Tourney in Busan	+4 (68-76-76=220)	1 stroke	(South Korea) Moon Hyun-hee (South Korea) Hong Ran (South Korea) Jiyai Shin
3	20 May 2007	Taeyoung Cup Korea Women's Open	−4 (73-69-70=212)	4 strokes	(South Korea) Jung Jae-eun (South Korea) Eun-Hee Ji (United States) Cristie Kerr
4	6 Jul 2007	MBC Tour Korea Golf Art Village Open	−12 (69-63=132)	1 stroke	(South Korea) Eun-Hee Ji
5	3 Oct 2008	Samsung Finance Ladies Championship	−10 (65-69-72=206)	2 strokes	(South Korea) Yoon Chae-young
6	10 May 2009	KB Star Tour First Tourney in Hampyeong	−12 (68-66-70=204)	6 strokes	(South Korea) Hee Kyung Seo
7	6 Sep 2009	KB Star Tour Second Tourney in Kyeongsan	−17 (68-66-66=202)	3 strokes	(South Korea) Song Min-ji

=== LPGA of Japan Tour wins (28) ===
No.	Date	Tournament	Winning score	Margin of victory	Runner(s)-up
1	8 Mar 2010	Daikin Orchid Ladies	−10 (69-70-67=206)	5 strokes	(Japan) Kaori Aoyama (Japan) Chie Arimura (Japan) Shinobu Moromizato (South Korea) Inbee Park (South Korea) Jiyai Shin
2	18 Jul 2010	Stanley Ladies	−6 (70-71-69=210)	Playoff	(South Korea) Lee Ji-hee
3	10 Oct 2010	Sankyo Ladies Open	−10 (69-70-67=206)	Playoff	(South Korea) Inbee Park
4	17 Oct 2010	Fujitsu Ladies	−19 (65-62-70=207)	7 strokes	(South Korea) Jiyai Shin
5	8 May 2011	World Ladies Championship Salonpas Cup	−10 (71-67-71-69=278)	3 strokes	(Taiwan) Teresa Lu (Japan) Miki Saiki
6	12 Jun 2011	Suntory Ladies Open	−14 (67-70-67-70=274)	1 stroke	(Japan) Chie Arimura (South Korea) Lee Ji-hee
7	14 Aug 2011	NEC Karuizawa 72	−16 (68-66-66=200)	Playoff	(Japan) Akiko Fukushima
8	9 Oct 2011	Sankyo Ladies Open	−9 (71-66-70=207)	2 strokes	(South Korea) Lee Ji-woo (South Korea) Jeon Mi-jeong (Japan) Shiho Oyama
9	6 May 2012	World Ladies Championship Salonpas Cup	−8 (67-69-72=208)	Playoff	(South Korea) Inbee Park (United States) Morgan Pressel
10	26 Aug 2012	Nitori Ladies	−14 (71-63-68=202)	2 strokes	(South Korea) Jeon Mi-jeong
11	2 Sep 2012	Golf5 Ladies	−15 (67-68-66=201)	1 stroke	(South Korea) Lee Ji-hee
12	25 Aug 2013	CAT Ladies	−12 (70-68-60=198)	3 strokes	(Japan) Ritsuko Ryu
13	1 Sep 2013	Nitori Ladies Golf Tournament	−11 (70-70-65=205)	2 strokes	(Taiwan) Teresa Lu
14	6 April 2014	Yamaha Ladies Open Katsuragi	−5 (70-69-72-72=283)	1 stroke	(Japan) Yumiko Yoshida
15	25 May 2014	Chukyo TV Bridgestone Ladies Open	−8 (69-69-70=208)	3 strokes	(South Korea) Lee Ji-hee (Japan) Sakai Miki (Japan) Ritsuko Ryu (Japan) Miki Saiki (Taiwan) Phoebe Yao (Japan) Sakura Yokomine
16	15 Jun 2014	Suntory Ladies Open	−14 (69-71-68-66=274)	5 strokes	(Japan) Akane Iijima
17	12 Oct 2014	Stanley Ladies Golf Tournament	−14 (68-68-66=202)	2 strokes	(South Korea) Lee Ji-hee
18	19 Oct 2014	Fujitsu Ladies	−11 (64-69-72=205)	Playoff	(Japan) Sakura Yokomine (Japan) Erika Kikuchi
19	26 Jul 2015	Century 21 Ladies Golf Tournament	−15 (64-67-70=201)	1 stroke	(Japan) Erika Kikuchi (South Korea) Bae Hee-kyung
20	8 Nov 2015	Toto Japan Classic^	−16 (68-65-67=200)	Playoff	(South Korea) Lee Ji-hee (United States) Angela Stanford
21	24 Jul 2016	Century 21 Ladies Golf Tournament	−9 (73-67-67=207)	1 stroke	(Japan) Megumi Kido (Japan) Erika Kikuchi
22	9 Oct 2016	Stanley Ladies	−6 (69-69=138)	Playoff	(South Korea) Lee Bo-mee
23	5 Mar 2017	Daikin Orchid Ladies Golf Tournament	−6 (73-67-69-73=282)	1 stroke	(Japan) Fumika Kawagishi
24	11 Mar 2018	Yokohama Tire Golf Tournament PRGR Ladies Cup	−11 (71-66-68=205)	Playoff	(Japan) Ai Suzuki
25	1 Apr 2018	Yamaha Ladies Open Katsuragi	−5 (72-71-71-69=283)	2 strokes	(Japan) Erika Kikuchi
26	8 Jul 2018	Nipponham Ladies Classic	−13 (69-67-67=203)	2 strokes	(Japan) Fumika Kawagishi
27	26 Aug 2018	Nitori Ladies Golf Tournament	−7 (70-70-71-70=281)	3 strokes	(Japan) Ayaka Watanabe
28	21 Oct 2018	Nobuta Group Masters GC Ladies	−12 (65-70-67-74=276)	2 strokes	(South Korea) Kim Ha-neul

^ Co-sanctioned with the LPGA Tour
