= Kim Ha-neul (golfer) =

South Korean professional golfer

Kim Ha-neul 김하늘
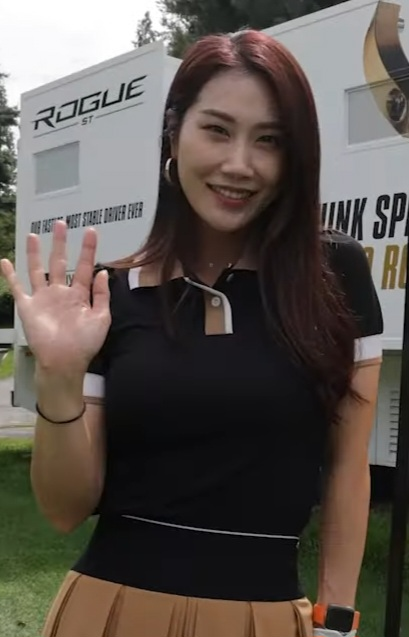

Personal information
- Nationality: South Korea
- Born: 17 December 1988 (age 37)
- Height: 1.70 m (5 ft 7 in)

Career
- Sport: Golf
- Turned professional: 2007
- Current tours: LPGA of Korea Tour (joined 2007); LPGA of Japan Tour
- Professional wins: 15

Number of wins by tour
- LPGA of Japan Tour: 6
- LPGA of Korea Tour: 8
- Other: 1

Best results in LPGA major championships
- Chevron Championship: T11: 2012
- Women's PGA C'ship: DNP
- U.S. Women's Open: T25: 2013
- Women's British Open: DNP
- Evian Championship: DNP

Achievements and awards
- LPGA of Korea Tour leading money winner: 2011, 2012

Kim Ha-neul (Korean: 김하늘, born 17 December 1988), also known as Ha-neul Kim, is a South Korean professional golfer.

Since 2015, Kim is playing full-time on the LPGA of Japan Tour having secured her card in the final qualifying tournament of the 2014 season.

In January 2022, Kim signed with YG KPlus after retiring from professional golf after 15 years. She debuted as a commentator for the 2025 KLPGA 25th Hite Jinro Championship on SBS on September 25.

== Professional wins (15) ==
=== LPGA of Korea Tour wins (8) ===
No.	Date	Tournament	Winning score	To par	Margin of victory	Runner-up
1	2 May 2008	Phoenix Park Classic	69-68-67=204	−12	4 strokes	(South Korea) Jiyai Shin
2	1 Jun 2008	Hillstate Seokyung Ladies Open	71-71-69=211	−5	1 stroke	(South Korea) Ahn Sun-ju
3	21 Sep 2008	SK Energy Invitational	67-68=135	−9	2 strokes	(South Korea) Lee Jeong-eun (South Korea) Jiyai Shin
4	24 Apr 2011	Hyundai E&C Seokyung Ladies Open	71-67-71=210	−6	Playoff	(South Korea) Lee Hyun-ju
5	16 Oct 2011	**Hite Jinro Championship**	70-72-72-71=285	−3	1 stroke	(South Korea) Mirim Lee
6	6 Nov 2011	eDaily-KYJ Golf Ladies Open	64-71-70=205	−11	4 strokes	(South Korea) Kim Hye-youn (South Korea) Shim Hyun-hwa (South Korea) Choi Yoo-rim
7	7 Oct 2012	Rush & Cash Charity Classic	70-70-68=208	−8	1 stroke	(South Korea) Cho Young-ran
8	25 Aug 2013	MBN-KYJ Golf Ladies Open	68-68-66-63=265	−23	2 strokes	(South Korea) Kim Hyo-joo

Tournaments in bold denotes major tournaments in LPGA of Korea.

=== LPGA of Japan Tour (6) ===
No.	Date	Tournament	Winning score	To par	Margin of victory	Runner-up
1	20 Sep 2015	Munsingwear Ladies Tokai Classic	69-67-68=204	−12	1 stroke	(South Korea) Jiyai Shin (Japan) Ayaka Matsumori
2	27 Mar 2016	AXA Ladies Golf Tournament in Miyazaki	67-71-69=207	−9	5 strokes	(South Korea) Jiyai Shin
3	27 Nov 2016	**Japan LPGA Tour Championship Ricoh Cup**	71-69-67-72=279	−9	1 stroke	(Japan) Misuzu Narita
4	30 Apr 2017	Cyber Agent Ladies Golf Tournament	68-71-70=209	−7	Playoff	(Japan) Ai Suzuki
5	7 May 2017	**World Ladies Championship Salonpas Cup**	74-66-70-69=279	−9	3 strokes	(South Korea) Ko Jin-young (United States) Lexi Thompson
6	18 Jun 2017	Suntory Ladies Open	67-68-67-71=273	−15	1 stroke	(Japan) Kotone Hori

=== Other wins (1) ===
- 2013 Mission Hills World Ladies Championship – team (with Inbee Park)

== Filmography ==
=== Television shows ===
Year	Title	Role	Notes	Ref.
2022	Curling Queens	Cast	Holiday specials	
2022	Hole-in-One between legends	Host		
2022	Runway to the sky	Host		

== Awards and nominations ==
Award	Year	Category	Nominee / Work	Result	Ref.
Asia Model Awards	2022	Asia Special Award, Sports	Kim Ha-neul	Won	
