= World Ladies Championship Salonpas Cup =

Coordinates: 36.002452°N 140.052681°E

Tournament information
- Location: Tsukubamirai, Ibaraki
- Established: 1973
- Course: Ibaraki Golf Club
- Par: 72
- Length: 6,655 yards (6,085 m)
- Tour: LPGA of Japan Tour
- Format: Stroke play
- Prize fund: ¥120,000,000
- Month played: May

Current champion
- (Japan) Yui Kawamoto

The World Ladies Championship Salonpas Cup is one of the four major golf tournaments for women on the LPGA of Japan Tour. It was founded in 1973 by Nippon Television and has been classified as a major since 2008. The annual tournament is held at the Ibaraki Golf Club in Tsukubamirai, Ibaraki, and Hisamitsu Pharmaceutical serves as the title sponsor.

== Tournament names ==
- 1973–1984: World Ladies Golf Tournament
- 1985–1986: Roku Konishi Cup World Ladies Golf Tournament
- 1987–1992: Konica Cup World Ladies Golf Tournament
- 1993: World Ladies Golf Tournament
- 1994–1999: Gunze Cup World Ladies Golf Tournament
- 2000–2004: Nichirei Cup World Ladies Golf Tournament
- 2005–2007: Salonpas World Ladies Golf Tournament
- 2008–present: World Ladies Championship Salonpas Cup

== Winners ==
- 2026 Yui Kawamoto
- 2025 Jiyai Shin
- 2024 Lee Hyo-song (a)
- 2023 Yuri Yoshida
- 2022 Miyū Yamashita
- 2021 Yuna Nishimura
- 2020 Cancelled
- 2019 Hinako Shibuno
- 2018 Jiyai Shin
- 2017 Kim Ha-neul
- 2016 Lexi Thompson
- 2015 Chun In-gee
- 2014 Misuzu Narita
- 2013 Hiromi Mogi
- 2012 Ahn Sun-ju
- 2011 Ahn Sun-ju
- 2010 Morgan Pressel
- 2009 Shinobu Moromizato
- 2008 Akiko Fukushima
- 2007 Jeon Mi-jeong
- 2006 Shiho Oyama
- 2005 Yuri Fudoh
- 2004 Rui Kitada
- 2003 Annika Sörenstam
- 2002 Yuri Fudoh
- 2001 Karrie Webb
- 2000 Karrie Webb
- 1999 Yoko Inoue
- 1998 Liselotte Neumann
- 1997 Tseng Hsiu-feng
- 1996 Haga Yukiyo
- 1995 Kaori Higo
- 1994 Won Jae-sook
- 1993 Mayumi Hirase
- 1992 Yuuko Moriguchi
- 1991 Beth Daniel
- 1990 Beth Daniel
- 1989 Fukumi Tani
- 1988 Kayoko Ikoma
- 1987 Ayako Okamoto
- 1986 Casey Chan
- 1985 Tu Ai-yu
- 1984 Cai Lixiang
- 1983 Tomiko Ikebuchi
- 1982 Tu Ai-yu
- 1981 Jan Stephenson
- 1980 Masako Sasaki
- 1979 Beth Daniel
- 1978 Yuko Moriguchi
- 1977 Ayako Okamoto
- 1976 Jane Blalock
- 1975 Jane Blalock
- 1974 Hisako Higuchi
- 1973 Hisako Higuchi
