= Daikin Orchid Ladies Golf Tournament =

Daikin Orchid Ladies
Tournament information
- Location: Nanjō, Okinawa
- Established: 1988
- Course: Ryukyu Golf Club
- Par: 72
- Tour: LPGA of Japan Tour
- Format: Stroke play
- Prize fund: ¥120 million
- Month played: March

Current champion
- (Japan) Shuri Sakuma

The Daikin Orchid Ladies Golf Tournament is an annual event on the LPGA of Japan Tour. It was first held in March 1988 at the Ryukyu GC in Okinawa Prefecture. The prize money in 2025 was ¥120,000,000 with ¥21,600,000 going to the winner.

== Winners ==
- 2026 (Japan) Shuri Sakuma
- 2025 (Japan) Chisato Iwai
- 2024 (Japan) Chisato Iwai
- 2023 (South Korea) Jiyai Shin
- 2022 (Japan) Mao Saigo
- 2021 (Japan) Sakura Koiwai
- 2020 Cancelled
- 2019 (Japan) Mamiko Higa
- 2018 (South Korea) Lee Min-young
- 2017 (South Korea) Ahn Sun-ju
- 2016 (Taiwan) Teresa Lu
- 2015 (Taiwan) Teresa Lu
- 2014 (Thailand) Onnarin Sattayabanphot
- 2013 (Japan) Rikako Morita
- 2012 (Japan) Airi Saitoh
- 2011 (South Korea) Inbee Park
- 2010 (South Korea) Ahn Sun-ju
- 2009 (Japan) Yuko Mitsuka
- 2008 (South Korea) Song Bo-bae
- 2007 (Japan) Midori Yoneyama
- 2006 (Japan) Mikiyo Nishizuka
- 2005 (Japan) Orie Fujino
- 2004 (Japan) Ai Miyazato
- 2003 (Japan) Yuri Fudoh
- 2002 (Japan) Kasumi Fujii
- 2001 (Japan) Yuri Fudoh
- 2000 (Japan) Orie Fujino
- 1999 (Japan) Yoko Inoue
- 1998 (South Korea) Kim Ae-sook
- 1997 (South Korea) Ko Woo-soon
- 1996 (Taiwan) Li Wen-lin
- 1995 (New Zealand) Marnie McGuire
- 1994 (Japan) Akiko Fukushima
- 1993 (Japan) Fuki Kido
- 1992 (United States) Patty Sheehan
- 1991 (United States) Amy Benz
- 1990 (Japan) Aiko Takasu
- 1989 (United States) Patti Rizzo
- 1988 (Taiwan) Huang Bie-shyun
