= Shiho Oyama =

Japanese professional golfer (born 1977)

Personal information
- Nationality: Japan
- Born: 25 May 1977 (age 49) Miyazaki, Japan
- Height: 1.68 m (5 ft 6 in)

Career
- Sport: Golf
- Turned professional: 2000
- Current tour: LPGA of Japan Tour
- Former tour: LPGA Tour (2009)
- Professional wins: 22

Number of wins by tour
- LPGA of Japan Tour: 18
- Ladies Asian Golf Tour: 1
- Other: 3

Best results in LPGA major championships
- Chevron Championship: T31: 2008
- Women's PGA C'ship: CUT: 2009
- U.S. Women's Open: T5: 2015
- Women's British Open: CUT: 2007, 2009, 2014, 2015
- Evian Championship: DNP

Achievements and awards
- LPGA of Japan Tour Player of the Year: 2006
- LPGA of Japan Tour leading money winner: 2006

Shiho Oyama (大山志保, Ōyama Shiho; born 25 May 1977) is a Japanese professional golfer.

Oyama plays on the LPGA of Japan Tour where she has won 17 times and led the money list in 2006. She played on the LPGA Tour in 2009.

Oyama competed for Japan at the 2016 Summer Olympics, finishing 42nd.

== Professional wins (22) ==
=== LPGA of Japan Tour wins (18) ===
No.	Date	Tournament	Winning score	To par	Margin of victory	Runner(s)-up
1	6 Jul 2003	Belluna Ladies Cup	73-67-67=207	−9	Playoff	(South Korea) Shin Sora (Japan) Hiroko Yamaguchi
2	18 Sep 2005	Munsingwear Ladies Tokai Classic	68-72-66=206	−10	3 strokes	(Japan) Kaori Higo
3	27 Nov 2005	**Japan LPGA Tour Championship Ricoh Cup**	70-67-75-71=283	−5	4 strokes	(Japan) Yuri Fudoh
4	23 Apr 2006	Fujisankei Ladies Classic	74-70-71=215	−1	Playoff	(Japan) Akane Iijima
5	7 May 2006	Salonpas World Ladies Golf Tournament	72-66-73-70=281	−7	6 strokes	(South Korea) Shin Hyun-ju
6	6 Aug 2006	Crystal Geyser Ladies	67-69-69=205	−11	1 stroke	(Taiwan) Tseng Hsiu-feng
7	13 Aug 2006	NEC Karuizawa 72	68-69-33=170	−10	3 strokes	(Japan) Michiko Hattori (Japan) Miho Koga (Japan) Hiromi Motegi
8	27 Aug 2006	Yonex Ladies Golf Tournament	68-70-70=208	−8	3 strokes	(South Korea) Lee Jeong-eun
9	17 Jun 2007	Nichirei PGM Ladies	68-68-71=207	−9	1 stroke	(Japan) Kaori Aoyama
10	8 Jul 2007	Meiji Chocolate Cup	66-72-71=209	−7	2 strokes	(Japan) Shinobu Moromizato
11	26 Oct 2008	Masters GC Ladies	65-75-69=209	−7	4 strokes	(South Korea) Hwang Ah-reum (South Korea) Lim Eun-a
12	23 Oct 2011	Masters GC Ladies	72-70-67=209	−7	Playoff	(United States) Paula Creamer
13	1 Dec 2013	**Japan LPGA Tour Championship Ricoh Cup**	69-71-73-66=279	−9	4 strokes	(Taiwan) Teresa Lu
14	7 Sep 2014	Golf5 Ladies	65-63-72=200	−16	2 strokes	(Japan) Misuzu Narita
15	26 Oct 2014	Nobuta Group Masters GC Ladies	65-67-69-68=269	−19	2 strokes	(South Korea) Ahn Sun-ju
16	7 Jun 2015	Yonex Ladies Golf Tournament	68-67-71=206	−10	1 stroke	(Taiwan) Teresa Lu
17	24 Apr 2016	Fujisankei Ladies Classic	68-69-68=205	−11	1 stroke	(South Korea) Ahn Sun-ju (Japan) Ritsuko Ryu
18	3 Jun 2018	Yonex Ladies Golf Tournament	70-68-68=206	−10	4 strokes	(Japan) Minami Katsu (Japan) Ayako Kimura (Japan) Mizuki Ooide (Japan) Momoko Ueda

Tournaments in bold denotes major tournaments in LPGA of Japan Tour.

=== Ladies Asian Golf Tour wins (1) ===
- 2001 Malaysia Ladies Open

=== Other wins (3) ===
- 2011 Hitachi 3Tours Championship
- 2014 Hitachi 3Tours Championship
- 2015 Hitachi 3Tours Championship

== Team appearances ==
Professional

- The Queens (representing Japan): 2015 (winners), 2016
