= Ku Ok-hee =

South Korean professional golfer (1956–2013

Ku Ok-hee 구옥희
Personal information
- Nationality: South Korea
- Born: 1 August 1956 Seoul, South Korea
- Died: 10 July 2013 (aged 56) Shizuoka, Japan
- Height: 1.62 m (5 ft 4 in)

Career
- Sport: Golf
- Status: Professional
- Former tours: LPGA of Japan Tour (1984–2006); LPGA Tour (1986–1991)
- Professional wins: 24

Number of wins by tour
- LPGA Tour: 1
- LPGA of Japan Tour: 23

Best results in LPGA major championships
- Chevron Championship: 10th: 1991
- Women's PGA C'ship: T12: 1986
- U.S. Women's Open: T14: 1986
- du Maurier Classic: T9: 1988
- Women's British Open: DNP

Achievements and awards
- LPGA of Japan Tour Rookie of the Year: 1985

Ku Ok-hee (Korean: 구옥희; 1 August 1956 – 10 July 2013) was a South Korean professional golfer who played on the LPGA of Japan Tour and the LPGA Tour.

Ku won 23 times on the LPGA of Japan Tour between 1985 and 2005 and won once on the LPGA Tour in 1988, the first South Korean to do so.

She was president of the LPGA of Korea Tour from 2011 to 2012.

Ku died of a heart attack on 10 July 2013 at her residence on a golf course in Shizuoka, Japan, and was 56 years old.

== Professional wins ==
=== LPGA of Japan Tour (23) ===
- 1985 (3) Kibun Ladies Classic, Tohato Ladies, Tohoku Queens
- 1987 (1) Tokai Classic
- 1990 (1) Ben Hogan & Itsuki Classic
- 1991 (2) SAZALE Queens, **JLPGA Meiji Dairies Cup**
- 1992 (1) **Japan LPGA Championship**
- 1993 (1) Karasumajo & Itsuki Classic
- 1996 (2) Toyo Suisan Ladies Hokkaido, Daio Paper Elleair Women's Open
- 1997 (2) Dunlop Twin Lakes Ladies Open, Daio Paper Elleair Women's Open
- 1998 (1) Chukyo TV Bridgestone Ladies Open
- 1999 (2) Nasuogawa Ladies, Miyagi TV Cup Dunlop Women's Open
- 2000 (3) Miyagi TV Cup Dunlop Women's Open, Itoen Ladies, Daio Paper Elleair Ladies Open
- 2002 (2) Fujisankei Ladies Classic, **Japan LPGA Championship Konica Cup**
- 2003 (1) Vernal Ladies
- 2005 (1) APiTa Circle K Sunkus Ladies

Tournament in bold denotes major championships in LPGA of Japan Tour.

=== LPGA Tour (1) ===
No.	Date	Tournament	Winning score	Margin of victory	Runners-up
1	27 Mar 1988	Standard Register Turquoise Classic	−11 (71-68-70-72=281)	1 stroke	(United States) Dottie Mochrie (Japan) Ayako Okamoto
