= 2026 Evian Championship =

Golf tournament

Tournament information
- Dates: 9–12 July 2026
- Location: Évian-les-Bains, France; 46.394°N 6.570°E
- Course: Evian Resort Golf Club
- Tours: Ladies European Tour; LPGA Tour

Statistics
- Par: 71
- Length: 6,479 yards (5,924 m)
- Field: 132 players 66 after cut
- Cut: 142 (E)
- Prize fund: $9,100,000
- Winner's share: $1,400,000

Champion
- (South Korea) Ryu Hae-ran
- 265 (−19)
- Location in France Location in Auvergne-Rhône-Alpes

The 2026 Evian Championship was played 9–12 July in France. It was the 32nd Evian Championship (the first 20 played as the Evian Masters), and the 13th as a major championship on the LPGA Tour.

Ryu Hae-ran won in a playoff with Brooke Henderson. It was Ryu's first Evain win and her second consecutive major win of the year.

== Field ==
The field for the tournament was set at 132, and most earned exemptions based on past performance on the Ladies European Tour, the LPGA Tour, or with a high ranking in the Women's World Golf Rankings. (Note: (a) – denotes amateur)

1. Evian invitations (six)

- Aphrodite Deng (a)
- Lauren Kim (a)
- Farah O'Keefe (a)
- Kiara Romero (a)
- Sayaka Takahashi
- Asterisk Talley (a)

2. Top 50 from Women's World Golf Rankings

- Casandra Alexander (7)
- Céline Boutier (4,6)
- Choi Hye-jin
- Carlota Ciganda
- Allisen Corpuz (5)
- Lauren Coughlin (6)
- Lindy Duncan
- Ayaka Furue (4)
- Linn Grant (6)
- Hannah Green (6)
- Nasa Hataoka (6)
- Brooke Henderson (4,6)
- Charley Hull (6)
- Hwang You-min (6)
- Im Jin-hee
- Akie Iwai (6)
- Chisato Iwai
- Ariya Jutanugarn (8)
- Minami Katsu
- Seo Kyo-rim
- Kim A-lim
- Auston Kim
- Grace Kim (4,8)
- Kim Hyo-joo (6)
- Kim Sei-young (6)
- Lydia Ko (5)
- Nelly Korda (5,6)
- Jennifer Kupcho (5)
- Shiho Kuwaki
- Andrea Lee (8)
- Minjee Lee (4,5,8)
- Lee So-mi
- Liu Yan
- Gaby López (8)
- Ryu Hae-ran (5)
- Mao Saigo (5)
- Shuri Sakuma
- Maja Stark (5)
- Rio Takeda
- Patty Tavatanakit
- Jeeno Thitikul (6)
- Lottie Woad (6,8)
- Miyū Yamashita (5,6)
- Yin Ruoning (5)
- Yoo Hyun-jo
- Ina Yoon
- Chun In-gee (4,5), Yui Kawamoto, Kim Min-sol, and Angel Yin (8) did not play

3. Top player not already qualified from the Jabra Ladies Open de France

- Helen Briem

4. Past Evian Championship winners

- Ko Jin-young
- Anna Nordqvist

5. Majors winners (last five years)

- Ashleigh Buhai
- Yuka Saso
- Lilia Vu
- Amy Yang

6. LPGA tournament winners (since last Evian)

- Gina Kim
- Lee Mi-hyang
- Wang Xinying
- Yana Wilson did not play

7. LET Order of Merit (top seven from 2025, top seven from current year)

- Kajsa Arwefjäll
- Kelsey Bennett
- Alexandra Försterling
- Cara Gainer
- Esme Hamilton
- Leonie Harm
- Alice Hewson
- Anna Huang
- Sára Kousková
- Agathe Laisné
- Nastasia Nadaud
- Mimi Rhodes
- Chiara Tamburlini
- Shannon Tan

8. Top 10 and ties previous year's Evian Championship

- Leona Maguire
- Gabriela Ruffels

9. Amateur winners

- María José Marín (Augusta National Women's Amateur and Women's Amateur Latin America)
- Yang Yun-seo (Women's Amateur Asia-Pacific)
- Valentine Delon (The Women's Amateur Championship) did not play
- Megha Ganne (U.S. Women's Amateur) forfeited her exemption by turning professional

10. LPGA Tour CME Globe points list (if needed to fill the field to 132)

- An Na-rin
- Pajaree Anannarukarn
- Aditi Ashok
- Jenny Bae
- Ana Belac
- Chella Choi
- Robyn Choi
- Karis Davidson
- Manon De Roey
- Perrine Delacour
- Brianna Do
- Amanda Doherty
- Jodi Ewart Shadoff
- Isi Gabsa
- Melanie Green
- Nataliya Guseva
- Erika Hara
- Esther Henseleit
- Hsu Wei-ling
- Jeon Ji-won
- Joo Soo-bin
- Minji Kang
- Megan Khang
- Frida Kinhult
- Alison Lee
- Lucy Li
- Ingrid Lindblad
- Yu Liu
- Mary Liu
- Julia López Ramirez
- Polly Mack
- Nanna Koerstz Madsen
- Brooke Matthews
- Yuna Nishimura
- Yealimi Noh
- Ryann O'Toole
- Alexa Pano
- Pornanong Phatlum
- Cassie Porter
- Pauline Roussin
- Hinako Shibuno
- Jenny Shin
- Carla Tejedo Mulet
- Suvichaya Vinijchaitham
- Lauren Walsh
- Chanettee Wannasaen
- Dewi Weber
- Jing Yan
- Yuri Yoshida
- Arpichaya Yubol
- Rose Zhang
- Zhang Weiwei
- Thidapa Suwannapura did not play

== Round summaries ==
=== First round ===
Thursday, 9 July 2026

Akie Iwai shot a 8-under-par round of 63 to take a two-stroke lead over Perrine Delacour. World number 1 Nelly Korda, winner of the year's first two majors, shot a 3-over-par 74. Ryu Hae-ran, winner of the year's other major, was tied for third with a 66.

Place	Player	Score	To par
1	(Japan) Akie Iwai	63	−8
2	(France) Perrine Delacour	65	−6
T3	(England) Charley Hull	66	−5
T3	(South Korea) Im Jin-hee	66	−5
T3	(South Korea) Ryu Hae-ran	66	−5
T3	(Japan) Mao Saigo	66	−5
T3	(Sweden) Maja Stark	66	−5
T8	(England) Cara Gainer	67	−4
T8	(Japan) Erika Hara	67	−4
T8	(Canada) Brooke Henderson	67	−4
T8	(South Korea) Minji Kang	67	−4
T8	(England) Lottie Woad	67	−4
T8	(United States) Jing Yan	67	−4
T8	(China) Yin Ruoning	67	−4

=== Second round ===
Friday, 10 July 2026

Lottie Woad shot a 7-under-par 64, tied for the low round of the day, to take a one-stroke lead over first round leader Akie Iwai. Ryu Hae-ran, winner of the previous major of the year, was tied for third with Mao Saigo, two strokes behind Iwai. World number one Nelly Korda missed the cut by one stroke. The cut came at 142, even par, with 66 players (including four amateurs) advancing to the final two rounds.

Place	Player	Score	To par
1	(England) Lottie Woad	67-64=131	−11
2	(Japan) Akie Iwai	63-69=132	−10
T3	(South Korea) Ryu Hae-ran	66-68=134	−8
T3	(Japan) Mao Saigo	66-68=132	−8
T5	(England) Charley Hull	66-70=136	−6
T5	(France) Nastasia Nadaud	68-68=136	−6
T5	(Thailand) Jeeno Thitikul	72-64=136	−6
T5	(Japan) Miyū Yamashita	70-66=136	−6
T9	(France) Perrine Delacour	65-72=137	−5
T9	(Japan) Erika Hara	67-70=137	−5
T9	(Canada) Brooke Henderson	67-70=137	−5
T9	(South Korea) Im Jin-hee	66-71=137	−5
T9	(United States) Auston Kim	70-67=137	−5
T9	(Sweden) Anna Nordqvist	69-68=137	−5
T9	(Japan) Shuri Sakuma	70-67=137	−5
T9	(Japan) Hinako Shibuno	69-68=137	−5
T9	(Sweden) Maja Stark	66-71=137	−5

=== Third round ===
Saturday, 11 July 2026

Ryu Hae-ran shot a women's major lowest round record 60 (−11) to take a three stroke lead over Akie Iwai. The round was one stroke better than three other golfers' 61, all shot at the Evian Championship. Ryu won the previous major of the year, the KPMG Women's PGA Championship.

Place	Player	Score	To par
1	(South Korea) Ryu Hae-ran	66-68-60=194	−19
2	(Japan) Akie Iwai	63-69-65=197	−16
T3	(Canada) Brooke Henderson	67-70-64=201	−12
T3	(Japan) Mao Saigo	66-68-67=201	−12
5	(South Africa) Casandra Alexander	73-66-63=202	−11
T6	(Thailand) Jeeno Thitikul	72-64-67=203	−10
T6	(Japan) Miyū Yamashita	70-66-67=203	−10
T6	(England) Lottie Woad	67-64-72=203	−10
9	(South Korea) Im Jin-hee	66-71-67=204	−9
T10	(England) Cara Gainer	67-72-66=205	−8
T10	(United States) Auston Kim	70-67-68=205	−8
T10	(Sweden) Anna Nordqvist	69-68-68=205	−8
T10	(Japan) Hinako Shibuno	69-68-68=205	−8

=== Final round ===
Sunday, 12 July 2026

Ryu Hae-ran shot an even-par 71 to end the day at 265 (−19) and in a tie with Brooke Henderson. Henderson shot a second consecutive round of 64 that included a hole-in-one on the par-3 8th hole and two other eagles. In the sudden-death playoff, Henderson made par while Ryu birdied to win her second consecutive major of the year.

Place	Player	Score	To par	Money (US$)
1	(South Korea) Ryu Hae-ran^	66-68-60-71=265	−19	1,400,000
2	(Canada) Brooke Henderson	67-70-64-64=265	−19	835,391
3	(Japan) Akie Iwai	63-69-65-69=266	−18	606,017
T4	(South Korea) Im Jin-hee	66-71-67-65=269	−15	384,954
T4	(Japan) Mao Saigo	66-68-67-68=269	−15	384,954
T4	(Japan) Miyū Yamashita	70-66-67-66=269	−15	384,954
T7	(New Zealand) Lydia Ko	69-69-69-64=271	−13	242,409
T7	(Sweden) Anna Nordqvist	69-68-68-66=271	−13	242,409
9	(United States) Auston Kim	70-67-68-67=272	−12	203,533
T10	(South Africa) Casandra Alexander	73-66-63-71=273	−11	166,709
T10	(South Korea) Lee So-mi	68-70-71-64=273	−11	166,709
T10	(Sweden) Maja Stark	66-71-69-67=273	−11	166,709
T10	(Thailand) Jeeno Thitikul	72-64-67-70=273	−11	166,709

Leaderboard below the top 10
Place	Player	Score	To par	Money (US$)
14	(Japan) Erika Hara	67-70-70-67=274	−10	140,869
15	(South Korea) Amy Yang	70-68-68-69=275	−9	132,634
T16	(England) Charley Hull	66-70-71-69=276	−8	112,209
T16	(Thailand) Ariya Jutanugarn	70-68-69-69=276	−8	112,209
T16	(United States) Jennifer Kupcho	69-70-69-68=276	−8	112,209
T16	(Japan) Hinako Shibuno	69-68-68-71=276	−8	112,209
T16	(Singapore) Shannon Tan	69-72-67-68=276	−8	112,209
T16	(England) Lottie Woad	67-64-72-73=276	−8	112,209
T22	(Canada) Anna Huang	70-71-66-70=277	−7	92,504
T22	(South Korea) Kim Sei-young	69-70-73-65=277	−7	92,504
T22	(United States) Andrea Lee	70-70-70-67=277	−7	92,504
T22	(France) Nastasia Nadaud	68-68-74-67=277	−7	92,504
T26	(Australia) Karis Davidson	70-71-66-71=278	−6	72,111
T26	(Russia) Nataliya Guseva	70-69-72-67=278	−6	72,111
T26	(Japan) Minami Katsu	70-68-69-71=278	−6	72,111
T26	(South Korea) Kim A-lim	71-69-69-69=278	−6	72,111
T26	(South Korea) Kim Hyo-joo	69-73-69-67=278	−6	72,111
T26	(China) Mary Liu	70-69-68-71=278	−6	72,111
T26	(Australia) Cassie Porter	69-72-68-69=278	−6	72,111
T26	(Thailand) Patty Tavatanakit	70-69-71-68=278	−6	72,111
T26	(China) Yin Ruoning	67-73-71-67=278	−6	72,111
T35	(Thailand) Pajaree Anannarukarn	73-67-68-71=279	−5	53,970
T35	(England) Jodi Ewart Shadoff	69-70-69-65=279	−5	53,970
T35	(South Korea) Minji Kang	67-74-66-72=279	−5	53,970
T35	(United States) Farah O'Keefe (a)	68-74-68-69=279	−5	0
T35	(Japan) Shuri Sakuma	70-67-71-71=279	−5	53,970
T35	(United States) Jing Yan	67-72-75-65=279	−5	53,970
T41	(Sweden) Kajsa Arwefjäll	69-70-70-71=280	−4	41,506
T41	(United States) Jenny Bae	76-66-69-69=280	−4	41,506
T41	(England) Cara Gainer	67-72-66-75=280	−4	41,506
T41	(South Korea) Joo Soo-bin	72-67-69-72=280	−4	41,506
T41	(Japan) Shiho Kuwaki	70-69-71-70=280	−4	41,506
T41	(United States) Alison Lee	69-71-73-67=280	−4	41,506
T41	(Thailand) Arpichaya Yubol	70-72-66-72=280	−4	41,506
T41	(South Korea) Yang Yun-seo (a)	72-70-68-70=280	−4	0
T41	(United States) Rose Zhang	70-72-69-69=280	−4	41,506
T50	(France) Perrine Delacour	65-72-70-74=281	−3	33,386
T50	(Chinese Taipei) Hsu Wei-ling	69-72-70-70=281	−3	33,386
T50	(France) Pauline Roussin	74-68-68-71=281	−3	33,386
T53	(South Korea) Chella Choi	68-72-71-71=282	−2	30,186
T53	(Japan) Ayaka Furue	68-73-68-73=282	−2	30,186
T53	(South Korea) Ina Yoon	69-70-73-70=282	−2	30,186
56	(India) Aditi Ashok	70-70-69-74=283	−1	28,359
T57	(Colombia) María José Marín (a)	74-66-71-73=284	E	0
T57	(Czech Republic) Sára Kousková	72-67-72-73=284	E	27,441
T59	(United States) Melanie Green	71-70-68-76=285	+1	26,069
T59	(Denmark) Nanna Koerstz Madsen	72-69-71-73=285	+1	26,069
T61	(Sweden) Linn Grant	69-73-74-70=286	+2	24,242
T61	(Switzerland) Chiara Tamburlini	71-70-72-73=286	+2	24,242
63	(United States) Ryann O'Toole	69-73-70-75=287	+5	22,869
64	(Canada) Lauren Kim (a)	70-71-76-72=289	+8	0
T65	(United States) Brianna Do	72-70-78-72=292	+2	22,183
T65	(Japan) Yuka Saso	72-67-77-76=292	+2	22,183
CUT	(South Korea) Choi Hye-jin	71-72=143	+3	0
CUT	(United States) Allisen Corpuz	72-71=143	+3	0
CUT	(United States) Lauren Coughlin	71-72=143	+3	0
CUT	(Australia) Hannah Green	70-73=143	+3	0
CUT	(Japan) Chisato Iwai	70-73=143	+3	0
CUT	(United States) Nelly Korda	74-69=143	+3	0
CUT	(Mexico) Gaby López	73-70=143	+3	0
CUT	(Spain) Julia López Ramírez	72-71=143	+3	0
CUT	(United States) Yealimi Noh	72-71=143	+3	0
CUT	(South Korea) Seo Kyo-rim	74-69=143	+3	0
CUT	(United States) Asterisk Talley (a)	70-73=143	+3	0
CUT	(Thailand) Suvichaya Vinijchaitham	76-67=143	+3	0
CUT	(Australia) Kelsey Bennett	74-70=144	+2	0
CUT	(Australia) Robyn Choi	73-71=144	+2	0
CUT	(United States) Amanda Doherty	72-72=144	+2	0
CUT	(Germany) Isi Gabsa	73-71=144	+2	0
CUT	(Germany) Leonie Harm	73-71=144	+2	0
CUT	(Germany) Esther Henseleit	72-72=144	+2	0
CUT	(France) Agathe Laisné	73-71=144	+2	0
CUT	(Japan) Yuna Nishimura	70-74=144	+2	0
CUT	(Japan) Rio Takeda	72-72=144	+2	0
CUT	(Netherlands) Dewi Weber	71-73=144	+2	0
CUT	(China) Zhang Weiwei	70-74=144	+2	0
CUT	(France) Céline Boutier	76-69=145	+2	0
CUT	(Germany) Helen Briem	73-72=145	+2	0
CUT	(South Korea) Hwang You-min	72-73=145	+2	0
CUT	(South Korea) Jeon Ji-won	73-72=145	+2	0
CUT	(United States) Megan Khang	71-74=145	+2	0
CUT	(Australia) Grace Kim	73-72=145	+2	0
CUT	(Sweden) Frida Kinhult	73-72=145	+2	0
CUT	(South Korea) Lee Mi-hyang	71-74=145	+2	0
CUT	(Germany) Polly Mack	74-71=145	+2	0
CUT	(Republic of Ireland) Leona Maguire	71-74=145	+2	0
CUT	(Japan) Sayaka Takahashi	71-74=145	+2	0
CUT	(Spain) Carla Tejedo Mulet	73-72=145	+2	0
CUT	(United States) Lilia Vu	72-73=145	+2	0
CUT	(Belgium) Manon De Roey	74-72=146	+4	0
CUT	(Canada) Aphrodite Deng (a)	72-74=146	+4	0
CUT	(Germany) Alexandra Försterling	71-75=146	+4	0
CUT	(United States) Gina Kim	75-71=146	+4	0
CUT	(United States) Lucy Li	74-72=146	+4	0
CUT	(China) Yu Liu	74-72=146	+4	0
CUT	(United States) Alexa Pano	70-76=146	+4	0
CUT	(Republic of Ireland) Lauren Walsh	73-73=146	+4	0
CUT	(South Korea) Yoo Hyun-jo	74-72=146	+4	0
CUT	(Japan) Yuri Yoshida	73-73=146	+4	0
CUT	(South Africa) Ashleigh Buhai	75-72=147	+5	0
CUT	(Spain) Carlota Ciganda	72-75=147	+5	0
CUT	(China) Liu Yan	77-70=147	+5	0
CUT	(United States) Brooke Matthews	72-75=147	+5	0
CUT	(United States) Kiara Romero (a)	74-73=147	+5	0
CUT	(South Korea) Jenny Shin	75-72=147	+5	0
CUT	(South Korea) Ko Jin-young	74-74=148	+6	0
CUT	(England) Mimi Rhodes	76-72=148	+6	0
CUT	(Slovenia) Ana Belac	74-75=149	+7	0
CUT	(Thailand) Pornanong Phatlum	76-73=149	+7	0
CUT	(Thailand) Chanettee Wannasaen	78-71=149	+7	0
CUT	(United States) Lindy Duncan	73-77=150	+8	0
CUT	(South Korea) An Na-rin	77-74=151	+7	0
CUT	(England) Esme Hamilton	80-71=151	+7	0
CUT	(England) Alice Hewson	77-74=151	+7	0
CUT	(Sweden) Ingrid Lindblad	78-74=152	+10	0
CUT	(Australia) Minjee Lee	77-77=154	+12	0
CUT	(China) Miranda Wang	77-77=154	+12	0
CUT	(Australia) Gabriela Ruffels	78-77=155	+13	0
WD	(Japan) Nasa Hataoka	80=80	+9	0

^ Ryu won with a birdie on the first sudden-death playoff hole.
