= 2023 U.S. Women's Open =

Tournament information
- Dates: July 6–9, 2023
- Location: Pebble Beach, California, U.S. 36.568°N 121.950°W
- Course: Pebble Beach Golf Links
- Organized by: USGA
- Tour: LPGA Tour

Statistics
- Par: 72
- Length: 6,509 yards (5,952 m)
- Field: 156 players, 74 after cut
- Cut: 150 (+6)
- Prize fund: $11,000,000
- Winner's share: $2,000,000

Champion
- (United States) Allisen Corpuz
- 279 (−9)
- Location in the United States Location in California

The 2023 U.S. Women's Open was the 78th U.S. Women's Open, held July 6 to 9 at the Pebble Beach Golf Links in Pebble Beach, California.

Allisen Corpuz won by three strokes over Charley Hull and Jiyai Shin. It was her first LPGA Tour win.

== Venue ==
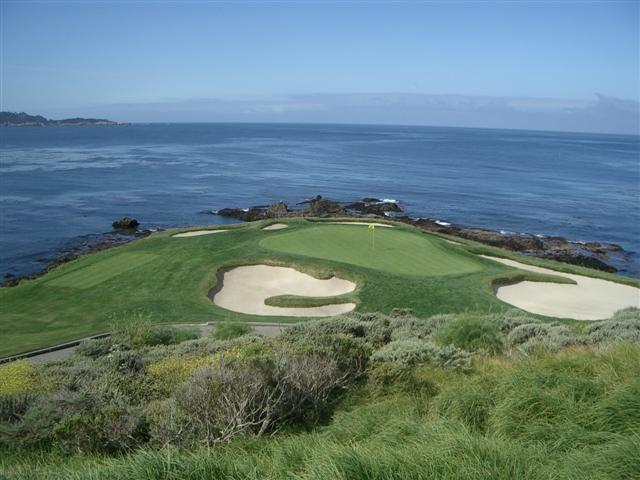
Pebble Beach Golf Links, hole 7

The course had previously hosted the U.S. Open for men six times. This was the first U.S. Women's Open held on the course.

=== Course layout ===
| Hole | 1 | 2 | 3 | 4 | 5 | 6 | 7 | 8 | 9 | Out | 10 | 11 | 12 | 13 | 14 | 15 | 16 | 17 | 18 | In | Total |
|---|---|---|---|---|---|---|---|---|---|---|---|---|---|---|---|---|---|---|---|---|---|
| Yards | 344 | 509 | 384 | 308 | 187 | 496 | 107 | 395 | 437 | 3,167 | 429 | 367 | 173 | 391 | 542 | 376 | 374 | 175 | 515 | 3,342 | 6,509 |
| Par | 4 | 5 | 4 | 4 | 3 | 5 | 3 | 4 | 4 | 36 | 4 | 4 | 3 | 4 | 5 | 4 | 4 | 3 | 5 | 36 | 72 |

== Field ==
The field for the U.S. Women's Open was made up of players who gained entry through qualifying events and those who were exempt from qualifying. The exemption criteria included provision for recent major champions, winners of major amateur events, and leading players in the Women's World Golf Rankings.

The USGA accepted a record number of entries for the championship, 2,107 players.

The purse for the tournament was a record $11 million with a record winner's share of $2 million. Those who did not make the cut, received a payment of $8,000.

=== Exemptions ===
This list details the exemption criteria for the 2023 U.S. Women's Open and the players exempt. Many players were exempt in multiple categories. (Note: (a) – denotes amateur)

1. Winners of the U.S. Women's Open for the last 10 years (2013–2022)

- Chun In-gee (7,10,17)
- Ariya Jutanugarn
- Kim A-lim
- Brittany Lang
- Lee Jeong-eun (17)
- Minjee Lee (2,8,10,17)
- Park Sung-hyun (7)
- Yuka Saso (10)
- Michelle Wie West

2. From the 2022 U.S. Women's Open, the 10 lowest scorers and anyone tying for 10th place

- Choi Hye-jin (10,17)
- Mina Harigae (17)
- Megan Khang (10,17)
- Ko Jin-young (6,8,10,11,16,17)
- Lydia Ko (10,11,17)
- Nelly Korda (7,10,11,16,17)
- Bronte Law
- Leona Maguire (10,11,17)
- Anna Nordqvist (9,17)

3. Winner of the 2022 U.S. Senior Women's Open

- Jill McGill

4. Winner of the 2022 U.S. Women's Amateur

- Saki Baba (a)

5. Winners of the 2022 U.S. Girls' Junior and U.S. Women's Mid-Amateur and the 2022 U.S. Women's Amateur runner-up (must be an amateur)

- Krissy Carman (a)
- Monet Chun (a)
- Yana Wilson (a)

6. Winners of the Chevron Championship (2019–2023)

- Jennifer Kupcho (10,11,17)
- Mirim Lee
- Patty Tavatanakit (17)
- Lilia Vu (10,11,16,17)

7. Winners of the Women's PGA Championship (2018–2023)

- Hannah Green (10,11,16,17)
- Kim Sei-young (17)
- Yin Ruoning (11,16,17)

8. Winners of The Evian Championship (2018–2022)

- Brooke Henderson (10,11,16,17)
- Angela Stanford

9. Winners of The Women's Open (2018–2022)

- Ashleigh Buhai (10,11,17)
- Georgia Hall (10,16,17)
- Hinako Shibuno (17)

10. The top 30 point leaders from the 2022 LPGA Race to the CME Globe Final Points.

- Marina Alex (17)
- Céline Boutier (11,16,17)
- Jodi Ewart Shadoff (11,17)
- Ayaka Furue (11,16,17)
- Nasa Hataoka (17)
- Charley Hull (11,17)
- Danielle Kang (17)
- Kim Hyo-joo (17)
- Andrea Lee (11,17)
- Lin Xiyu (17)
- Gaby López (11,17)
- Nanna Koerstz Madsen (17)
- Madelene Sagström (17)
- Atthaya Thitikul (11,16,17)
- Lexi Thompson (17)

11. Winners of individual LPGA co-sponsored events, whose victories were considered official, from the conclusion of the 2022 U.S. Women's Open to the initiation of the 2023 U.S. Women's Open (only events that awarded a full point allocation for the Race to the CME Globe)

- Pajaree Anannarukarn
- Gemma Dryburgh (17)
- Ally Ewing (17)
- Grace Kim
- Paula Reto (17)
- Maja Stark (17)
- Rose Zhang (Note: Zhang originally qualified by winning 2023 Augusta National Women's Amateur, the 2022 Mark H. McCormack Medal and the 2023 NCAA Division I Individual Golf Championship all as an amateur before announcing that she was turning pro.) (19)

12. Winner of the 2023 Augusta National Women's Amateur (must be an amateur)

13. Winner of the 2022 Women's Amateur Championship (must be an amateur)

- Jessica Baker (a)

14. Winner of the 2022 Mark H. McCormack Medal (No. 1 in World Amateur Golf Ranking; must be an amateur)

15. Winner of the 2023 NCAA Division I Individual Golf Championship (must be an amateur)

16. From the 2023 Race to CME Globe, the top 10 point leaders as of May 3, 2023

17. From the current Women's World Golf Rankings, the top 75 players and anyone tying for 75th place as of May 3, 2023

- An Na-rin
- Aditi Ashok
- Chella Choi
- Carlota Ciganda
- Allisen Corpuz
- Linn Grant
- Chisato Iwai
- Ji Eun-hee
- Minami Katsu
- Haruka Kawasaki
- Cheyenne Knight
- Alison Lee
- Lee Da-yeon
- Lee So-mi
- Yuna Nishimura
- Ryann O'Toole
- Park Min-ji
- Ryu Hae-ran
- Mao Saigo
- Lizette Salas
- Jiyai Shin
- Momoko Ueda
- Miyū Yamashita
- Amy Yang
- Angel Yin
- Yuri Yoshida
- Jessica Korda, Mone Inami, Lim Hee-jeong did not play..

18. From the current Women's World Golf Rankings, the top 75 players and anyone tying for 75th place as of July 3, 2023

- Akie Iwai
- Albane Valenzuela

19. Special exemptions

- Ryu So-yeon
- Annika Sörenstam

=== Qualifying ===
Qualifying took place May 9 to June 7, 2023, via 36-hole stroke-play qualifiers at 26 different sites, 23 of them in the United States and one each in Belgium, Canada and Japan.

| Date | Location | Venue | Field | Spots | Qualifiers | Ref |
|---|---|---|---|---|---|---|
| May 9 | Naples, Florida | The Club of Mediterra | 69 | 2 | Lindy Duncan, Brooke Matthews | |
| May 9 | Pittsburgh, Pennsylvania | Shannopin Country Club | 54 | 2 | Amelia Garvey, Angela Zhang (a) | |
| May 15 | Coquitlam, Canada | Vancouver Golf Club | 58 | 2 | Lauren Kim (a), Gabriela Ruffels | |
| May 15 | Atlanta, Georgia | Druid Hills Golf Club | 78 | 2 | Sarah Edwards (a), Benedetta Moresco (a) | |
| May 15 | Westfield, New Jersey | Echo Lake Country Club | 81 | 4 | Haeji Kang, Annie Park, Jenny Shin, Natthakritta Vongtaveelap | |
| May 17 | Alexandria, Virginia | Belle Haven Country Club | 72 | 4 | Jaravee Boonchant, María Fassi, Ruixin Liu, Yin Xiaowen | |
| May 22 | Novato, California | Marin Country Club | 75 | 2 | Huang Ting-hsuan (a), Dewi Weber | |
| May 22 | Valencia, California | Valencia Country Club | 74 | 2 | Zoe Campos (a), Anna Davis (a) | |
| May 22 | Bradenton, Florida | Bradenton Country Club | 71 | 2 | Pernilla Lindberg, Beatrice Wallin | |
| May 22 | Honolulu, Hawaii | Oahu Country Club | 46 | 1 | Marissa Chow | |
| May 22 | Mendota Heights, Minnesota | Somerset Country Club | 46 | 2 | Amy Olson, Bailey Tardy | |
| May 24 | St. Louis, Missouri | Bellerive Country Club | 78 | 2 | Jing Yan, Sophie Linder (a) | |
| May 24 | Galveston, Texas | Galveston Country Club | 68 | 2 | Dottie Ardina, Aline Krauter | |
| May 25 | Carrollton, Texas | Indian Creek Golf Club (Creek Course) | 75 | 2 | Maddison Hinson-Tolchard (a), Farah O'Keefe (a) | |
| May 29 | Wanze, Belgium | Golf Club de Naxhelet | 68 | 3 | Manon De Roey, Alice Hewson, Emma Spitz | |
| May 29 | Chiba Prefecture, Japan | Boso Country Club (East/West Courses) | 123 | 5 | Akie Iwai (18), Aya Kinoshita, Kana Mikashima, Miyu Sato, Hana Wakimoto | |
| May 30 | Scottsdale, Arizona | Gainey Ranch Golf Club | 68 | 2 | Julia Misemer (a), Grace Summerhays (a) | |
| May 31 | Greensboro, North Carolina | Starmount Forest Country Club | 70 | 2 | Emilia Migliaccio (a), Haru Nomura | |
| May 31 | Columbus, Ohio | Ohio State University Golf Club (Scarlet Course) | 77 | 2 | Teresa Toscano Borrero, Charlotte Thomas | |
| Jun 1 | Broomfield, Colorado | The Broadlands Golf Course | 65 | 2 | Sadie Englemann (a), Megan Propeck (a) | |
| Jun 5 | Rancho Santa Fe, California | Rancho Santa Fe Golf Club | 64 | 2 | Amari Avery (a), Jeneath Wong (a) | |
| Jun 5 | San Mateo, California | The Peninsula Golf & Country Club | 72 | 2 | Áine Donegan (a), Kelly Xu (a) | |
| Jun 5 | Woodburn, Oregon | OGA Golf Course | 70 | 2 | Minori Nagano (a), Ayako Uehara | |
| Jun 7 | Jupiter, Florida | The Club at Admirals Cove (North/West Courses) | 67 | 2 | Laura Sluman, Therese Warner | |
| Jun 7 | Palatine, Illinois | Palatine Hills Golf Course | 67 | 2 | Milagros Chaves, Mackenzie Hahn | |
| Jun 7 | Duxbury, Massachusetts | Duxbury Yacht Club | 72 | 3 | Celeste Dao (a), Daniela Darquea, Perrine Delacour | |

==== Alternates who gained entry ====
The following players gained a place in the field having finished as the leading alternates in the specified final qualifying events:

- Jenny Coleman (Atlanta)
- Moriya Jutanugarn (Galveston)
- Allysha Mae Mateo (a, Honolulu)
- Azahara Muñoz (Bradenton)
- Park Kum-kang (Westfield)
- Chizuru Komiya (a, Japan)
- Joy Chou (St. Louis)
- Amanda Doherty (Alexandria)
- Kaili Xiao (a, Novato)

== Round summaries ==
=== First round ===
Thursday, July 6, 2023

| Place | Player | Score | To par |
|---|---|---|---|
| T1 | (South Korea) Kim Hyo-joo | 68 | −4 |
| T1 | (China) Lin Xiyu | 68 | −4 |
| T3 | (United States) Allisen Corpuz | 69 | −3 |
| T3 | (Republic of Ireland) Áine Donegan (a) | 69 | −3 |
| T3 | (Japan) Nasa Hataoka | 69 | −3 |
| T3 | (Republic of Ireland) Leona Maguire | 69 | −3 |
| T3 | (South Korea) Ryu Hae-ran | 69 | −3 |
| T3 | (United States) Bailey Tardy | 69 | −3 |
| T9 | (United States) Amari Avery (a) | 70 | −2 |
| T9 | (South Korea) Lee Jeong-eun | 70 | −2 |
| T9 | (Italy) Benedetta Moresco (a) | 70 | −2 |
| T9 | (South Korea) Amy Yang | 70 | −2 |

=== Second round ===
Friday, July 7, 2023

| Place | Player | Score | To par |
|---|---|---|---|
| 1 | (United States) Bailey Tardy | 69-68=137 | −7 |
| T2 | (United States) Allisen Corpuz | 69-70=139 | −5 |
| T2 | (South Korea) Kim Hyo-joo | 68-71=139 | −5 |
| 4 | (South Korea) Ryu Hae-ran | 69-72=141 | −3 |
| T5 | (Japan) Nasa Hataoka | 69-74=143 | −1 |
| T5 | (Republic of Ireland) Leona Maguire | 69-74=143 | −1 |
| T7 | (South Korea) Chun In-gee | 72-72=144 | E |
| T7 | (Japan) Ayaka Furue | 74-70=144 | E |
| T7 | (South Korea) Jiyai Shin | 71-73=144 | E |
| T7 | (United States) Angel Yin | 71-73=144 | E |

=== Third round ===
Saturday, July 8, 2023

| Place | Player | Score | To par |
|---|---|---|---|
| 1 | (Japan) Nasa Hataoka | 69-74-66=209 | −7 |
| 2 | (United States) Allisen Corpuz | 69-70-71=210 | −6 |
| T3 | (South Korea) Kim Hyo-joo | 68-71-73=212 | −4 |
| T3 | (United States) Bailey Tardy | 69-68-75=212 | −4 |
| T5 | (South Korea) Ryu Hae-ran | 69-72-73=214 | −2 |
| T5 | (South Korea) Jiyai Shin | 71-73-70=214 | −2 |
| T7 | (England) Charley Hull | 73-72-71=216 | E |
| T7 | (United States) Angel Yin | 71-73-72=216 | E |
| T9 | (Japan) Ayaka Furue | 74-70-73=217 | +1 |
| T9 | (Australia) Minjee Lee | 72-73-72=217 | +1 |
| T9 | (Sweden) Maja Stark | 72-73-72=217 | +1 |
| T9 | (United States) Rose Zhang | 74-71-72=217 | +1 |

=== Final round ===
Sunday, July 9, 2023

| Place | Player | Score | To par | Money ($) |
|---|---|---|---|---|
| 1 | (United States) Allisen Corpuz | 69-70-71-69=279 | −9 | 2,000,000 |
| T2 | (England) Charley Hull | 73-72-71-66=282 | −6 | 969,231 |
| T2 | (South Korea) Jiyai Shin | 71-73-70-68=282 | −6 | 969,231 |
| T4 | (Japan) Nasa Hataoka | 69-74-66-76=285 | −3 | 482,136 |
| T4 | (United States) Bailey Tardy | 69-68-75-73=285 | −3 | 482,136 |
| T6 | (Japan) Ayaka Furue | 74-70-73-69=286 | −2 | 369,403 |
| T6 | (South Korea) Kim Hyo-joo | 68-71-73-74=286 | −2 | 369,403 |
| 8 | (South Korea) Ryu Hae-ran | 69-72-73-74=288 | E | 313,713 |
| T9 | (Sweden) Maja Stark | 72-73-72-72=289 | +1 | 272,355 |
| T9 | (United States) Rose Zhang | 74-71-72-72=289 | +1 | 272,355 |
