= 2026 Women's PGA Championship =

Golf tournament

2026 KPMG Women's PGA Championship
Tournament information
- Dates: June 25–28, 2026
- Location: Chaska, Minnesota; 44.834°N 93.591°W
- Course: Hazeltine National Golf Club
- Organized by: PGA of America
- Tour: LPGA Tour

Statistics
- Par: 72
- Length: 6,807 yards (6,224 m)
- Field: 156 players, 70 after cut
- Cut: 145 (+1)
- Prize fund: $13,000,000
- Winner's share: $1,950,000

Champion
- (South Korea) Ryu Hae-ran
- 275 (−13)
- Location in the United States Location in Minnesota

The 2026 KPMG Women's PGA Championship is the 72nd Women's PGA Championship. It is being played June 25–28 at Hazeltine National Golf Club in Chaska, Minnesota. Hazeltine previously hosted the Women's PGA Championship in 2019, won by Hannah Green. It also hosted the U.S. Women's Open in 1966 and 1977.

The PGA Championship was the third of five major championships on the LPGA Tour during the 2026 season.

Ryu Hae-ran won her first major championship by two strokes over Ina Yoon.

== Field ==
The field included 156 players who met one or more of the selection criteria and commit to participate by a designated deadline. (Note: (a) – denotes amateur)

1. Sponsor invitations

- Amari Avery
- Kate Smith-Stroh

2. Past winners of the Women's PGA Championship

- Chun In-gee (11)
- Hannah Green (4,7,11)
- Brooke Henderson (4,7,11)
- Danielle Kang
- Kim Sei-young (4,7,11)
- Nelly Korda (4,7,11)
- Minjee Lee (6,7,11)
- Anna Nordqvist (11)
- Park Sung-hyun
- Yani Tseng
- Amy Yang (11)
- Yin Ruoning (4,7,11)
- Cristie Kerr did not play

3. Professionals who have won an LPGA major championship in the previous five years and during the current year

- Céline Boutier (4,7,11)
- Ashleigh Buhai
- Allisen Corpuz (7,11)
- Ayaka Furue (7,11)
- Grace Kim (7,11)
- Lydia Ko (4,7,11)
- Jennifer Kupcho (4,7,11)
- Mao Saigo (7,11)
- Yuka Saso (11)
- Maja Stark (7,11)
- Patty Tavatanakit (4,7,11)
- Lilia Vu (4,11)
- Miyū Yamashita (4,6,7,11)

4. Professionals who have won an official LPGA tournament in the previous two calendar years and during the current year

- Carlota Ciganda (7,11)
- Lauren Coughlin (7,11)
- Linn Grant (7,11)
- Nasa Hataoka (7,11)
- Charley Hull (7,11)
- Hwang You-min (7,11)
- Im Jin-hee (7,11)
- Chisato Iwai (6,7,11)
- Akie Iwai (7,11)
- Moriya Jutanugarn
- Gina Kim (11)
- Kim A-lim (7,11)
- Kim Hyo-joo (7,11)
- Lee Mi-hyang (7,11)
- Lee So-mi (6,7,11)
- Ingrid Lindblad (11)
- Yealimi Noh (7,11)
- Ryu Hae-ran (7,11)
- Linnea Ström (11)
- Thidapa Suwannapura (11)
- Rio Takeda (7,11)
- Jeeno Thitikul (6,7,11)
- Wang Xinying (7)
- Chanettee Wannasaen (6,11)
- Yana Wilson (11)
- Lottie Woad (7,11)
- Angel Yin (6,7,11)
- Rose Zhang (11)
- Madelene Sagström (11) and Bailey Tardy (11) did not play

5. Order of Merit winners from the Ladies European Tour, LPGA of Japan Tour, and LPGA of Korea Tour

- Shannon Tan
- Shuri Sakuma (7) and Yoo Hyun-jo (7) did not play

6. Professionals who finished top-10 and ties at the previous year's Women's PGA Championship

- Choi Hye-jin (7,11)
- Hsu Wei-ling (11)
- Auston Kim (7,11)
- Pauline Roussin (11)

7. Professionals ranked No. 1–70 on the Women's World Golf Rankings on May 25, 2026

- Casandra Alexander
- Pajaree Anannarukarn (11)
- Jenny Bae (11)
- Lindy Duncan (11)
- Esther Henseleit (11)
- Anna Huang
- Ariya Jutanugarn (11)
- Minami Katsu (11)
- Megan Khang (11)
- Ko Jin-young (11)
- Shiho Kuwaki
- Andrea Lee (11)
- Liu Yan (11)
- Gaby López (11)
- Nanna Koerstz Madsen (11)
- Mimi Rhodes (11)
- Ina Yoon (11)
- Yuna Araki, Bang Shin-sil, Hong Jung-min, Yui Kawamoto, Kim Min-sol, Ko Ji-won, Lee Da-yeon, Lee Ye-won, Ro Seung-hui, Jiyai Shin, Fuka Suga, Ai Suzuki, and Sayaka Takahashi did not play

8. The top eight finishers at the 2025 LPGA Professionals National Championship

- Sandra Changkija
- Nicole Felce
- Loretta Giovannettone
- Allie Knight
- Kim Paez
- Natalie Vivaldi
- Allie White
- Stephanie Connelly Eiswerth did not play

9. The top finisher (not otherwise qualified via the 2025 LPGA Professionals National Championship) at the 2026 PGA Women's Stroke Play Championship

- Joanna Coe

10. Any player who did not compete in the 2025 KPMG Women's PGA Championship due to maternity (Note: As approved by the Women's PGA Championship in conjunction with the player’s home tour, provided she was otherwise qualified to compete in the 2026 Women's PGA Championship.)

- Alison Lee

11. LPGA members who have committed to the event, ranked in the order of their position on the 2026 CME Globe Points list

- An Na-rin
- Aditi Ashok
- Saki Baba
- Laetitia Beck
- Ana Belac
- Helen Briem
- Nicole Broch Estrup
- Briana Chacon
- Jennifer Chang
- Robyn Choi
- Chella Choi
- Olivia Cowan
- Karis Davidson
- Manon De Roey
- Perrine Delacour
- Amanda Doherty
- Brianna Do
- Gemma Dryburgh
- Jodi Ewart Shadoff
- Isabella Fierro
- Laney Frye
- Isi Gabsa
- Sofia García
- Melanie Green
- Nataliya Guseva
- Erika Hara
- Muni He
- Daniela Holmqvist
- Jeon Ji-won
- Joo Soo-bin
- Minji Kang
- Gurleen Kaur
- Frida Kinhult
- Aline Krauter
- Maude-Aimee Leblanc
- Lee Dong-eun
- Lucy Li
- Mary Liu
- Ruixin Liu
- Yu Liu
- Carolina Lopez-Chacarra
- Julia López Ramirez
- Polly Mack
- Leona Maguire
- Brooke Matthews
- Stephanie Meadow
- Carolina Melgrati
- Morgane Métraux
- Azahara Muñoz
- Nastasia Nadaud
- Yuna Nishimura
- Natasha Andrea Oon
- Ryann O'Toole
- Alexa Pano
- Pornanong Phatlum
- Cassie Porter
- Jessica Porvasnik
- Gabriela Ruffels
- Lizette Salas
- Sophia Schubert
- Hinako Shibuno
- Jenny Shin
- Chiara Tamburlini
- Carla Tejedo Mulet
- Suvichaya Vinijchaitham
- Lauren Walsh
- Dewi Weber
- Jing Yan
- Yuri Yoshida
- Arpichaya Yubol
- Zhang Weiwei
- Zhang Yahui
- Jodi Ewart Shadoff, Ruixin Liu, and Lexi Thompson did not play

== Round summaries ==
=== First round ===
Thursday, June 25, 2026

Ina Yoon tied the tournament record with a 9-under-par 63 to take a two stroke lead over Karis Davidson. Nelly Korda, winner of the season's first two majors, shot 70 and was in T-19 place.

Place	Player	Score	To par
1	(South Korea) Ina Yoon	63	−9
2	(Australia) Karis Davidson	65	−7
T3	(South Korea) Kim A-lim	67	−5
T3	(United States) Alexa Pano	67	−5
T5	(South Korea) Choi Hye-jin	68	−4
T5	(United States) Megan Khang	68	−4
T5	(Germany) Aline Krauter	68	−4
T8	(Japan) Ayaka Furue	69	−3
T8	(Canada) Brooke Henderson	69	−3
T8	(Germany) Esther Henseleit	69	−3
T8	(Chinese Taipei) Hsu Wei-ling	69	−3
T8	(United States) Alison Lee	69	−3
T8	(United States) Andrea Lee	69	−3
T8	(South Korea) Lee Dong-eun	69	−3
T8	(Denmark) Nanna Koerstz Madsen	69	−3
T8	(Thailand) Jeeno Thitikul	69	−3
T8	(United States) Jing Yan	69	−3
T8	(South Korea) Amy Yang	69	−3

=== Second round ===
Friday, June 26, 2026

Ina Yoon widen her lead to five strokes by shooting a second round 69. Tied for second place were four golfers including Nasa Hataoka and Ryu Hae-ran who both shot 64, the low rounds of the day. Nelly Korda, seeking her third major win of the season, shot 68 to climb into a tie for sixth place.

The cut came at 145 (+1) with 70 players advancing to the final two rounds.

Place	Player	Score	To par
1	(South Korea) Ina Yoon	63-69=132	−12
T2	(Japan) Nasa Hataoka	73-64=137	−7
T2	(Canada) Brooke Henderson	69-68=137	−7
T2	(South Korea) Kim A-lim	67-70=137	−7
T2	(South Korea) Ryu Hae-ran	73-64=137	−7
T6	(United States) Nelly Korda	70-68=138	−6
T6	(South Korea) Lee Dong-eun	69-69=138	−6
T8	(Australia) Karis Davidson	65-74=139	−5
T8	(Thailand) Patty Tavatanakit	71-68=139	−5
T8	(China) Zhang Weiwei	71-68=139	−5

=== Third round ===
Saturday, June 27, 2026

Ryu Hae-ran shot a 68 (4-under-par) round to take a one-stroke lead over Brooke Henderson. Ina Yoon, leader for the first two days, shot a 75 (3-over-par) to drop to third place.

Place	Player	Score	To par
1	(South Korea) Ryu Hae-ran	73-64-68=205	−11
2	(Canada) Brooke Henderson	69-68-69=206	−10
3	(South Korea) Ina Yoon	63-69-75=207	−9
T4	(South Korea) Kim A-lim	67-70-71=208	−8
T4	(Netherlands) Dewi Weber	70-70-68=208	−8
T6	(United States) Nelly Korda	70-68-71=209	−7
T6	(United States) Alison Lee	69-72-68=209	−7
T8	(Australia) Karis Davidson	65-74-71=210	−6
T8	(South Korea) Lee Dong-eun	69-69-72=210	−6
T8	(United States) Auston Kim	71-70-69=210	−6

=== Final round ===
Sunday, June 28, 2026

Ryu Hae-ran shot a 2-under-par 70 to claimed her first major championship by two stokes over Ina Yoon.

Place	Player	Score	To par	Money ($)
1	(South Korea) Ryu Hae-ran	73-64-68-70=275	−13	1,950,000
2	(South Korea) Ina Yoon	63-69-75-70=277	−11	1,169,108
T3	(Canada) Brooke Henderson	69-68-69-72=278	−10	752,090
T3	(Netherlands) Dewi Weber	70-70-68-70=278	−10	752,090
T5	(United States) Allisen Corpuz	71-70-70-70=281	−7	440,589
T5	(United States) Auston Kim	71-70-69-71=281	−7	440,589
T5	(United States) Alison Lee	69-72-68-72=281	−7	440,589
T8	(South Korea) Kim A-lim	67-70-71-74=282	−6	275,235
T8	(South Korea) Kim Sei-young	72-71-70-69=282	−6	275,235
T8	(United States) Nelly Korda	70-68-71-73=282	−6	275,235
T8	(Thailand) Jeeno Thitikul	69-71-72-70=282	−6	275,235
