= 2022 U.S. Women's Open =

Tournament information
- Dates: June 2–5, 2022
- Location: Southern Pines, North Carolina; 35.197°N 79.392°W
- Course: Pine Needles Lodge and Golf Club
- Organized by: USGA
- Tour: LPGA Tour

Statistics
- Par: 71
- Length: 6,597 yards (6,032 m) – 6,644 yards (6,075 m)
- Field: 156 players, 70 after cut
- Cut: 146 (+4)
- Prize fund: $10,000,000
- Winner's share: $1,800,000

Champion
- (Australia) Minjee Lee
- 271 (−13)
- Location in the United States Location in North Carolina

The 2022 U.S. Women's Open Presented by ProMedica was the 77th U.S. Women's Open, held June 2 to June 5 at the Pine Needles Lodge and Golf Club in Southern Pines, North Carolina. Minjee Lee won the second of her three major titles, four strokes ahead of runner-up Mina Harigae. Ingrid Lindblad finished leading amateur at tied 11th. She beat the amateur scoring records over 18, 36 and 54 holes and tied the 72-hole amateur record in the tournament.

Pine Needles previously hosted the championship in 1996, 2001, and 2007, becoming the first course to host the tournament four times.

== Venue ==
=== Course layout ===
Hole	1	2	3	4	5	6	7	8	9	Out	10	11	12	13	14	15	16	17	18	In	Total
Yards	502	419	131	393	188	404	417	351	375	3,180	513	368	399	204	440	524	171	426	413	3,458	6,638
Par	5	4	3	4	3	4	4	4	4	35	5	4	4	3	4	5	3	4	4	36	71

=== Yardage by round ===
Round	Hole	1	2	3	4	5	6	7	8	9	Out	10	11	12	13	14	15	16	17	18	In	Total
Round	Par	5	4	3	4	3	4	4	4	4	35	5	4	4	3	4	5	3	4	4	36	71
1st	Yards	507	424	123	393	174	402	419	350	365	3,157	517	366	395	193	441	530	164	431	406	3,443	6,600
2nd	Yards	497	420	125	393	194	401	422	365	376	3,193	507	382	405	171	399	518	179	429	417	3,407	6,600
3rd	Yards	493	413	129	391	187	399	409	357	366	3,144	520	365	412	198	438	521	174	419	406	3,453	6,597
Final	Yards	502	427	110	406	191	413	426	348	387	3,210	469	374	392	209	439	533	162	434	422	3,434	6,644

== Field ==
The field for the U.S. Women's Open is made up of players who gain entry through qualifying events and those who are exempt from qualifying. The exemption criteria include provision for recent major champions, winners of major amateur events, and leading players in the Women's World Golf Rankings.

=== Exemptions ===
This list details the exemption criteria for the 2022 U.S. Women's Open and the players who qualified under them; (Note: (a) – denotes amateur) any additional criteria under which players are exempt is indicated in parentheses.

1. Recent winners of the U.S. Women's Open (2012–2021)

- Choi Na-yeon
- Chun In-gee (9,15)
- Ariya Jutanugarn (2,9,15)
- Kim A-lim (15)
- Brittany Lang
- Lee Jeong-eun (9,15)
- Yuka Saso (2,9,15)
- Park Sung-hyun (6)
- Michelle Wie West
- Inbee Park (2,9,15) did not play.

2. The leading ten players, and those tying for tenth place, in the 2021 U.S. Women's Open

- Nasa Hataoka (9,10,15)
- Brooke Henderson (10,14,15)
- Megan Khang (15)
- Ko Jin-young (5,7,9,10,14,15)
- Lin Xiyu (14,15)
- Lexi Thompson (9,15)
- Angel Yin
- Shanshan Feng (15) did not play.

3. The winner of the 2021 U.S. Women's Amateur

- Jenson Castle (a)

4. The winner of the 2021 U.S. Girls' Junior and 2021 U.S. Women's Mid-Amateur, and finalist from the 2021 U.S. Women's Amateur (Note: Players qualifying in these categories must remain an amateur through the conclusion of the U.S. Open.)

- Rose Zhang (a, 13)
- Blakesly Brock (a)
- ~~Hou Yu-chiang~~ (Note: Hou forfeited her exemption by turning professional.)

5. Recent winners of the Chevron Championship (2018–2022)

- Jennifer Kupcho (9,10,14,15)
- Mirim Lee
- Pernilla Lindberg
- Patty Tavatanakit (9,15)

6. Recent winners of the Women's PGA Championship (2018–2021)

- Hannah Green (9,15)
- Kim Sei-young (9,15)
- Nelly Korda (9,10,15,17)

7. Recent winners of Evian Championship (2017–2019, 2021)

- Minjee Lee (9,10,15)
- Anna Nordqvist (8,9,10,15)
- Angela Stanford

8. Recent winners of Women’s British Open (2017–2021)

- Georgia Hall (9,15)
- In-Kyung Kim
- Sophia Popov (15)
- Hinako Shibuno (15)

9. The leading 30 players from the 2021 LPGA Race to the CME Globe final points standings

- Pajaree Anannarukarn (10,15)
- Céline Boutier (10,14,15)
- Matilda Castren (10,15)
- Ally Ewing (15)
- Moriya Jutanugarn (15)
- Danielle Kang (10,14,15)
- Kim Hyo-joo (15)
- Lydia Ko (10,14,15)
- Jessica Korda (15)
- Leona Maguire (10,14,15)
- Ryu So-yeon (15)
- Lizette Salas (15)
- Austin Ernst (15) did not play.

10. Winners of LPGA Tour sanctioned event between 2021 U.S. Women's Open and start of 2022 championship

- Marina Alex (15)
- Ji Eun-hee
- Nanna Koerstz Madsen (14,15)
- Ryann O'Toole (15)
- Atthaya Thitikul (14,15)

11. The winner of the 2022 Augusta National Women's Amateur

- Anna Davis (a)

12. The winner of the 2021 Women's Amateur Championship

- Louise Duncan (a)

13. The winner of the Mark H. McCormack Medal in 2021

14. The leading 10 players on the 2022 Race to CME Globe points standings as of April 6, 2022

15. The leading 75 players on the Women's World Golf Rankings as of April 6, 2022

- Brittany Altomare
- Na Rin An
- Pia Babnik
- Choi Hye-jin
- Carlota Ciganda
- Ayaka Furue
- Mina Harigae
- Charley Hull
- Sakura Kowai
- Alison Lee
- Lee So-mi
- Stacy Lewis
- Gaby López
- Caroline Masson
- Yuna Nishimura
- Yealimi Noh
- Amy Olson
- Mel Reid
- Ryu Hae-ran
- Madelene Sagström
- Mao Saigo
- Ai Suzuki
- Momoko Ueda
- Amy Yang
- Bae Seon Woo, Kitone Hori, Minami Katsu, Jang Ha-na, Mone Inami, Lee Da-yeon, Lim Hee-jeong, Park Hyun-kyung, Park Min-ji and Jiyai Shin did not play.

16. The leading 75 players on the Women's World Golf Rankings not otherwise exempt as of May 16, 2022

- Maja Stark
- Yoon Ina, Lee Gae-young, and Sayaka Takahashi did not play.

17. The winner of the 2020 Olympic Gold Medal

18. The winner of the 2021 U.S. Senior Women's Open

- Annika Sörenstam

19. The leading player from the China LPGA Tour order of merit not otherwise exempt as of April 6, 2022

- Liu Wenbo

20. Special exemptions

=== Qualifying ===
Date	Location	Venue	Field	Spots	Qualifiers
Apr 19	Kent, Washington	Meridian Valley Country Club	45	1	Kylee Choi (a)
Apr 22	Incheon, South Korea	Dream Park Country Club (Dream Course)	71	2	Alicia Joo (a), Lee Jeonghyun (a)
Apr 25	Mutsuzawa, Japan	Boso Country Club (East and West Courses)	156	6	Saki Baba (a), Mayu Hamada, Natsumi Hayakawa, Nika Ito (a), Yuri Onishi, Yuna Takagi
Apr 26	Scottsdale, Arizona	Gainey Ranch Golf Club	78	3	Alexandra Forsterling (a), Bronte Law, Stephanie Meadow
Apr 26	Ojai, California	Soule Park Golf Club	75	2	Lauren Gomez (a), Linnea Johansson
Apr 28	Richardson, Texas	Canyon Creek Country Club	73	2	Julianne Alvarez, Zhang Yunxuan (a)
May 2	Gainesville, Florida	Mark Bostick Golf Course	67	2	Annabell Fuller (a), Mariel Galdiano
May 3	Southern Pines, North Carolina	Mid Pines Inn & Golf Club	73	3	Anna Morgan (a), Pauline Roussin-Bouchard, Bethany Wu
May 3	Pittsburgh, Pennsylvania	Shannopin Country Club	55	3	Laney Frye (a), Auston Kim (a), Marissa Steen
May 3	Hockley, Texas	The Clubs at Houston Oaks	74	4	Karen Kim, Cheyenne Knight, Annie Park, Robynn Ree
May 4	St. Louis, Missouri	Fox Run Golf Club	67	4	Amanda Doherty, Isi Gabsa, Sofia Garcia, Lauren Miller (a)
May 4	Fort Myers, Florida	The Forest Country Club (Bear Course)	63	5	Jaye Marie Green, Melanie Green, Muni He, Bianca Pagdanganan, Paula Reto
May 4	Columbus, Ohio	Ohio State University Golf Club (Scarlett Course)	68	3	Daniela Darquea, Lauren Hartlage, Emma McMyler (a)
May 9	Stuart, Florida	Willoughby Golf Club	63	2	Alexa Pano (a), Bailey Shoemaker (a)
May 9	Pauma Valley, California	Pauma Valley Country Club	68	2	Alyaa Abdul, Catherine Park (a)
May 9	Honolulu, Hawaii	Oahu Country Club	44	1	Tiffany Chan
May 9	El Macero, California	El Macero Country Club	46	2	Lucy Li, Kathleen Scavo
May 9	Dunwoody, Georgia	Dunwoody Country Club	78	2	Gemma Dryburgh, Sara Im (a)
May 9	Chaska, Minnesota	Chaska Town Course	37	1	Gabby Lemieux
May 9	Aurora, Illinois	Stonebridge Country Club	46	1	Ingrid Gutierrez
May 10	Westminster, Colorado	Walnut Creek Golf Preserve	35	1	Malak Bouraeda (a)
May 10	Morristown, New Jersey	Morris County Golf Club	132	4	Grace Kim, Lauren Kim, Frida Kinhult, Maude-Aimée LeBlanc
May 10	Madera, California	Dragonfly Golf Club	45	2	Lee Il-hee, Gabriela Ruffels
May 11	Alexandria, Virginia	Belle Haven Country Club	62	2	Bailey Davis (a), Sarah Kemp
May 12	Worcester, Massachusetts	Worcester Country Club	32	1	Ami Gianchandani (a)
May 16	Buckinghamshire, England	Buckinghamshire Golf Club	49	3	Nicole Garcia, Lydia Hall, Smilla Sonderby

==== Alternates who gained entry ====
The following players gained a place in the field having finished as the leading alternates in the specified final qualifying events:

- Dottie Ardina (Fort Myers)
- Allisen Corpuz (Columbus)
- Allison Emrey (Southern Pines)
- Jillian Hollis (Aurora)
- Karissa Kilby (a, Honolulu)
- Lauren Kim (a, Kent)
- Kim Min-sol (a, Incheon)
- Andrea Lee (Pauma Valley)
- Ingrid Lindblad (a, Hockley)
- Park Boh-yun (a, Richardson)
- Pornanong Phatlum (Morristown)
- Lilia Vu (St. Louis)
- Britney Yada (Scottsdale)

== Round summaries ==
=== First round ===
Thursday, June 2, 2022

Place	Player	Score	To par
1	(United States) Mina Harigae	64	−7
2	(Sweden) Ingrid Lindblad (a)	65	−6
T3	(Australia) Minjee Lee	67	−4
T3	(Sweden) Anna Nordqvist	67	−4
T3	(United States) Ryann O'Toole	67	−4
T6	(United States) Ally Ewing	68	−3
T6	(United States) Lexi Thompson	68	−3
T8	(Finland) Matilda Castren	69	−2
T8	(United States) Allisen Corpuz	69	−2
T8	(Thailand) Moriya Jutanugarn	69	−2
T8	(South Korea) Kim Sei-young	69	−2
T8	(South Korea) Ko Jin-young	69	−2
T8	(England) Bronte Law	69	−2
T8	(United States) Amy Olson	69	−2
T8	(United States) Annie Park	69	−2
T8	(South Korea) Park Sung-hyun	69	−2
T8	(Sweden) Madelene Sagström	69	−2

=== Second round ===
Friday, June 3, 2022

Place	Player	Score	To par
T1	(United States) Mina Harigae	64-69=133	−9
T1	(Australia) Minjee Lee	67-66=133	−9
T3	(South Korea) Choi Hye-jin	71-64=135	−7
T3	(Sweden) Anna Nordqvist	67-68=135	−7
T5	(South Korea) Ko Jin-young	69-67=136	−6
T5	(Sweden) Ingrid Lindblad (a)	65-71=136	−6
T7	(Thailand) Moriya Jutanugarn	69-68=137	−5
T7	(South Korea) Kim Sei-young	69-67=137	−5
T9	(United States) Megan Khang	71-67=138	−4
T9	(England) Bronte Law	69-69=138	−4
T9	(United States) Andrea Lee	70-68=138	−4
T9	(United States) Ryann O'Toole	67-71=138	−4
T9	(South Korea) Park Sung-hyun	69-69=138	−4

=== Third round ===
Saturday, June 4, 2022

Place	Player	Score	To par
1	(Australia) Minjee Lee	67-66-67=200	−13
2	(United States) Mina Harigae	64-69-70=203	−10
3	(England) Bronte Law	69-69-68=206	−7
T4	(South Korea) Choi Hye-jin	71-64-72=207	−6
T4	(South Korea) Ko Jin-young	69-67-71=207	−6
T4	(New Zealand) Lydia Ko	72-69-66=207	−6
T4	(China) Lin Xiyu	71-69-67=207	−6
T4	(Sweden) Ingrid Lindblad (a)	65-71-71=207	−6
T4	(Sweden) Anna Nordqvist	67-68-72=207	−6
T10	(South Korea) Ji Eun-hee	70-69-69=208	−5
T10	(Thailand) Moriya Jutanugarn	69-68-71=208	−5
T10	(United States) Megan Khang	71-67-70=208	−5
T10	(Republic of Ireland) Leona Maguire	70-70-68=208	−5

=== Fourth round ===
Sunday, June 5, 2022

Place	Player	Score	To par	Money ($)
1	(Australia) Minjee Lee	67-66-67-71=271	−13	1,800,000
2	(United States) Mina Harigae	64-69-70-72=275	−9	1,080,000
3	(South Korea) Choi Hye-jin	64-69-70-72=277	−7	685,043
4	(South Korea) Ko Jin-young	69-67-71-71=278	−6	480,225
5	(New Zealand) Lydia Ko	72-69-66-72=279	−5	399,982
T6	(England) Bronte Law	69-69-68-74=280	−4	337,198
T6	(Sweden) Anna Nordqvist	67-68-72-73=280	−4	337,198
T8	(United States) Megan Khang	71-67-70-74=282	−2	261,195
T8	(United States) Nelly Korda	70-69-70-73=282	−2	261,195
T8	(Republic of Ireland) Leona Maguire	70-70-68-74=282	−2	261,195
