= Ryu Hae-ran =

South Korean professional golfer (born 2001)

Personal information
- Nationality: South Korea
- Born: 23 March 2001 (age 25) Geumjeong-myeon, Yeongam-gun, Jeollanam-do, South Korea
- Height: 175 cm (5 ft 9 in)

Career
- Sport: Golf
- Turned professional: 2019
- Current tours: LPGA Tour (joined 2023); LPGA of Korea Tour
- Professional wins: 11

Number of wins by tour
- LPGA Tour: 5
- Ladies European Tour: 1
- LPGA of Korea Tour: 6

Best results in LPGA major championships (wins: 2)
- Chevron Championship: 5th: 2024
- Women's PGA C'ship: Won: 2026
- U.S. Women's Open: 8th: 2023
- Women's British Open: T6: 2026
- Evian Championship: Won: 2026

Achievements and awards
- LPGA of Korea Tour Rookie of the Year: 2020
- LPGA Tour Rookie of the Year: 2023
Medal record
Asian Games
Silver medal – second place	2018 Jakarta–Palembang	Women's team

Ryu Hae-ran (born 23 March 2001), also known as Hae Ran Ryu, is a South Korean professional golfer and LPGA Tour player. She has eleven professional victories, with six on the LPGA of Korea Tour, and five on the LPGA Tour. She has won two LPGA majors—the 2026 Women's PGA Championship and the 2026 Evian Championship.

Ryu turned professional in 2019, competing on the LPGA of Korea Tour, where she won the Jeju Samdasoo Masters in her first tournament on the tour. She won four further events over the following three years before qualifying for the 2023 LPGA Tour. That year, she won the Walmart NW Arkansas Championship and was awarded LPGA Tour Rookie of the Year. She earned victories at the 2024 FM Championship and the 2025 Black Desert Championship before claiming back-to-back major victories in 2026.

== Amateur career ==
Ryu began playing golf in first grade. She missed the cut at the 2016 U.S. Women's Open, but finished third at the Korean Women's Amateur that year. She won silver medals with the Korean team at the World Junior Girls Championship in 2016 and 2017, and won an additional silver at the 2018 Asian Games. She represented the winning Asia/Pacific team in the 2018 Patsy Hankins Trophy. Ryu won the 2018 Korean Women's Amateur.

== Professional career ==
Ryu began competing on the LPGA of Korea Tour in mid-2019 after success on the KLPGA Dream Tour. She won the 2019 Jeju Samdasoo Masters on her first ever start on the tour. The tournament was reduced to 36 holes in response to adverse weather conditions and she recorded a two-stroke victory. This success earned her full status on the KLPGA Tour, and she defended the title the following year as a rookie, claiming a wire-to-wire victory. In her official rookie season, she was named the 2020 Rookie of the Year. That year, she climbed to 17th in the Women's World Golf Rankings.

In 2021, she won the ELCRU-TV Chosun Pro Celebrity, and secured a wire-to-wire victory at the SK Shieldus-SK Telecom Championship having finished runner-up in the event a year prior.

In 2022, Ryu won the Nexen Saint Nine Masters, and across the KLPGA Tour that year, she made 17 top-10 finishes and placed fourth on the money list. She then won the LPGA Q-Series to join the LPGA Tour in 2023. She became the second consecutive player from Korea to take medalist honors at the LPGA Q-Series, following An Na-rin's success in 2021. At the LPGA Drive On Championship, an eight-under-par third round moved her into second position ahead of the final day, but her challenge for the victory faded and she placed tied-7th.

Ryu was in contention at the 2023 U.S. Women's Open and finished in eighth place. At the Walmart NW Arkansas Championship, Ryu carded two bogeys on the front-nine of her final round, before making an eagle and four birdies on the back-nine to win her first LPGA Tour title. Her victory was wire-to-wire, and she won by three strokes from Linnea Strom. Ryu made six top-10 finishes during the year, and following a 12th place at The Annika, she secured the 2023 LPGA Tour Rookie of the Year.

At the 2024 Chevron Championship, Ryu held a one-stroke advantage after three rounds, but three bogeys in her first five holes of her final round saw her slip back, and she finished in fifth position, her best placing in a major at the time. She also recorded top-10 finishes at the JM Eagle LA Championship (third), and at the Women's PGA Championship, where she ended in a tie for ninth.

Ryu finished fifth at the 2024 Evian Championship, posted a second-place finish at the Dana Open, and ended in a tie for third at the CPKC Women's Open. She then achieved victory at the inaugural FM Championship, after defeating her compatriot Ko Jin-young in a playoff. She concluded the season with 13 top-10 finishes on the LPGA Tour, the most by any player.

At the 2025 Chevron Championship, Ryu led after the third round, but a final-round 76 left her unable to contend for victory. The following week, she secured a wire-to-wire victory at the Black Desert Championship, finishing the event five strokes clear of the field. She moved to number five in the world rankings. Ryu was selected to represent South Korea at the 2025 International Crown, but they failed to advance to the semi-finals, and were eliminated after winning one of their six matches. On the 2025 LPGA Tour, Ryu recorded five top-10 finishes from 23 starts.

On the 2026 LPGA Tour, Ryu finished runner-up to Lottie Woad at the Kroger Queen City Championship. She then took a short break to help recover from an abdominal injury. On her return, she won her first major at the 2026 Women's PGA Championship. Held at Hazeltine National Golf Club, she fell ten shots off the lead following the conclusion of the opening round, but shot 14-under-par across her next three rounds to secure a two-stroke victory from Ina Yoon. Her comeback was the joint largest in major history, matching the feat of Carol Mann at the 1964 Women's Western Open. She re-entered the top ten of the world rankings, reaching number seven.

A few weeks later, Ryu won back-to-back majors after achieving victory at the Evian Championship. An 11-under-par round of 60 in her third round, an all-time record low score in a women's major, helped earn her a three-stroke advantage. After the final round, she ended level with Brooke Henderson; the two contested a playoff with Ryu winning by making a birdie on the first extra hole. She subsequently rose to a career-high number three in the world rankings.

Ryu competed at the Women's British Open with the opportunity of winning a third straight major. She led after the conclusion of the second round, with a one-stroke advantage over Shiho Kuwaki. In the end, she lost her lead, and finished her final round with back-to-back bogeys as she placed in a tie for sixth. In October, she won her first major tournament on the KLPGA Tour at the Hite Jinro Championship, after securing a four-stroke victory. Ryu finished runner-up to Yuri Yoshida at the BMW Ladies Championship, having held a four-stroke advantage prior to her final round. She placed in a tie for third at The Annika.

== Amateur wins ==
- 2018 Neighbors Trophy Team Championship, Korean Women's Amateur – KangMinKoo Cup

== Professional wins (11) ==
=== LPGA Tour wins (5) ===
Legend
LPGA Tour major championships (2)
Other LPGA Tour (3)

No.	Date	Tournament	Winning score	To par	Margin of victory	Runner(s)-up	Winner's share ($)	Ref
1	1 Oct 2023	Walmart NW Arkansas Championship	64-64-66=194	−19	3 strokes	(Sweden) Linnea Strom	345,000	
2	1 Sep 2024	FM Championship	69-62-78-64=273	−15	Playoff	(South Korea) Ko Jin-young	570,000	
3	4 May 2025	Black Desert Championship	63-67-68-64=262	−26	5 strokes	(Germany) Esther Henseleit (China) Yin Ruoning	450,000	
4	28 Jun 2026	KPMG Women's PGA Championship	73-64-68-70=275	−13	2 strokes	(South Korea) Ina Yoon	1,950,000	
5	12 Jul 2026	Amundi Evian Championship^{[1]}	66-68-60-71=265	−19	Playoff	(Canada) Brooke Henderson	1,400,000	

^{1} Co-sanctioned by the Ladies European Tour.

LPGA Tour playoff record (2–0)

No.	Year	Tournament	Opponent	Result
1	2024	FM Championship	(South Korea) Ko Jin-young	Won with par on first extra hole
2	2026	Amundi Evian Championship	(Canada) Brooke Henderson	Won with birdie on first extra hole

=== LPGA of Korea Tour wins (6) ===
- 2019 (1) Jeju Samdasoo Masters
- 2020 (1) Jeju Samdasoo Masters
- 2021 (2) ELCRU-TV Chosun Pro Celebrity, SK Shieldus-SK Telecom Championship
- 2022 (1) Nexen Saint Nine Masters
- 2026 (1) Hite Jinro Championship

== Major championships ==
=== Wins (2) ===
Year	Championship	Winning score	Margin	Runner-up	Ref
2026	Women's PGA Championship	−13 (73-64-68-70=275)	2 strokes	(South Korea) Ina Yoon	
2026	Evian Championship	−19 (66-68-60-71=265)	Playoff^{1}	(Canada) Brooke Henderson	

^{1}Defeated Henderson in a sudden-death playoff: Ryu (4) Henderson (5)

=== Results timeline ===
Results not in chronological order.

Tournament	2016	2017	2018	2019	2020	2021	2022	2023	2024	2025	2026
Chevron Championship								T56	5	T6	T12
U.S. Women's Open	CUT				T13		CUT	8	T51	T36	
Women's PGA Championship								CUT	T9	T61	1
The Evian Championship			CUT		NT			T42	5	CUT	1
Women's British Open								T21	T49	T23	T6

Win
Top 10
Did not play

CUT = missed the half-way cut
T = tied
NT = no tournament

=== Summary ===
Tournament	Wins	2nd	3rd	Top-5	Top-10	Top-25	Events	Cuts made
Chevron Championship	0	0	0	1	2	3	4	4
U.S. Women's Open	0	0	0	0	1	2	6	4
Women's PGA Championship	1	0	0	1	2	2	4	3
The Evian Championship	1	0	0	2	2	2	5	3
Women's British Open	0	0	0	0	1	3	4	4
Totals	2	0	0	4	8	12	23	18

- Most consecutive cuts made – 11 (2023 U.S. Women's Open – 2025 Women's PGA)
- Longest streak of top-10s – 3 (2026 Women's PGA – 2026 Women' British Open, current)

== World ranking ==
Position in Women's World Golf Rankings at the end of each calendar year.

Year	Ranking	Source
2016	644	
2017	489	
2018	747	
2019	122	
2020	17	
2021	31	
2022	49	
2023	30	
2024	7	
2025	13	

== Team appearances ==
Amateur

- World Junior Girls Championship (representing South Korea): 2016, 2017
- Asian Games (representing South Korea): 2018
- Patsy Hankins Trophy (representing Asia/Pacific): 2018 (winners)

Professional

- International Crown (representing South Korea): 2025
