= 2026 LPGA of Korea Tour =

Golf tour season

The 2026 LPGA of Korea Tour was the 49th season of the LPGA of Korea Tour, the professional golf tour for women operated by the Korea Ladies Professional Golf' Association.

== Schedule ==
Below is the schedule for the 2026 season. "Date" is the ending date for the tournament. The number in parentheses after winners' names show the player's total number wins in official money individual events on the LPGA of Korea Tour, including that event.

Date	Tournament	Prize fund (KRW)	Winner	WWGR pts	Notes
15 Mar	Rejuran Championship	1,200,000,000	(South Korea) Lim Jin-yeong (1)	16.90	
5 Apr	Siena Open	1,000,000,000	(South Korea) Ko Ji-won (3)	17.95	
12 Apr	iM Financial Group Open	1,000,000,000	(South Korea) Kim Min-sol (3)	17.00	
19 Apr	Nexen SaintNine Masters	1,000,000,000	(South Korea) Kim Min-sun (2)	17.70	
26 Apr	DukshinEPC Championship	1,000,000,000	(South Korea) Lee Ye-won (10)	17.85	
3 May	DB Women's Championship	1,200,000,000	(South Korea) Yoo Hyun-jo (3)	17.30	
10 May	NH Investment & Securities Ladies Championship	1,000,000,000	(South Korea) Kim Hyo-joo (15)	18.63	
17 May	Doosan Match Play	1,000,000,000	(South Korea) Bang Shin-sil (6)	17.65	
24 May	E1 Charity Open	1,000,000,000	(Thailand) Jaravee Boonchant (1)	17.90	
31 May	Suhyup Bank MBN Ladies Open	1,000,000,000	(South Korea) Park Min-ji (20)	15.90	
7 Jun	Celltrion Queens Masters	1,500,000,000	(South Korea) Seo Kyo-rim (1)	16.55	
14 Jun	**Mercedes-Benz Korea Women's Open Golf Championship**	1,500,000,000	(South Korea) Kim Min-sol (4)	18.72	
21 Jun	Incar Financial The Heaven Masters	1,000,000,000	(South Korea) Seo Kyo-rim (2)	18.15	
28 Jun	McCol-Mona Yongpyong Open	1,000,000,000	(South Korea) Kim Min-sol (5)	17.35	
5 Jul	Lotte Open	1,200,000,000	(South Korea) Kim Hyo-joo (16)	20.10	
12 Jul	High1 Resort Ladies Open	1,000,000,000	(South Korea) Ko Ji-u (4)	17.50	
2 Aug	Aurora World Ladies Championship	1,000,000,000	(South Korea) Lee Da-yeon (10)	17.70	
9 Aug	Jeju Samdasoo Masters	1,000,000,000	(South Korea) Jang Eun-soo (1)	17.20	
16 Aug	Mediheal Hankook Ilbo Championship	1,000,000,000	(South Korea) Seo Kyo-rim (3)	18.85	
23 Aug	**BC Card-Hankyung KLPGA Championship**	1,500,000,000	(South Korea) Seo Kyo-rim (4)	26.00	
30 Aug	KG Ladies Open	1,000,000,000	(South Korea) Shin Da-in (2)	17.10	
6 Sep	OK Savings Bank OK Man Open	1,000,000,000	(South Korea) Choi Ye-rim (1)	17.85	
13 Sep	**KB Financial Group Golden Life Championship**	1,500,000,000	(South Korea) Park Bo-kyeom (4)	18.92	
20 Sep	Hana Financial Group Championship	1,500,000,000	(South Korea) Kim Min-sun (3)	19.83	
27 Sep	K-Food Nolboo-Hwami Masters	1,200,000,000	Cancelled		
4 Oct	**Hite Jinro Championship**	1,500,000,000	(South Korea) Ryu Hae-ran (6)	19.05	
11 Oct	HJ Ship building-Dongbu Construction Championship	1,000,000,000	(South Korea) Yoo Hyun-jo (4)	18.53	
18 Oct	Iceberg Golf-Seoul Shinmun Open	1,500,000,000	(South Korea) Ma Seo-young (1)	19.43	
25 Oct	Gwangnamilbo Happiness Open	1,000,000,000	Cancelled		
1 Nov	S-Oil Championship	1,000,000,000	(South Korea) Lee Ye-won (11)	17.90	
8 Nov	Daebo HausD Championship	1,000,000,000	(South Korea) Yoo Hyun-jo (5)	18.55	

Events in bold are majors.
