= Hazeltine National Golf Club =

Golf club in Chaska, Minnesota

- Hazeltine National Golf Club Hazeltine National Golf Club (Minnesota)
- 44.834°N 93.591°W

Club information
- Location: Chaska, Minnesota
- Established: 1962, 64 years ago
- Type: Private
- Tournaments: U.S. Open (1970, 1991) PGA Championship (2002, 2009) Ryder Cup (2016) Women's PGA Championship (2019, 2026)
- Website: hazeltinenational.com
- Designed by: Robert Trent Jones (1962); Davis Love III, Mark Love & Scot Sherman (2026 renovation)
- Par: 72
- Length: 7,674 yards (7,017 m)
- Course rating: 77.8

Hazeltine National Golf Club (/ˈheɪzəltin/ HAY-zəl-teen) is a golf club in the north central United States, located in Chaska, Minnesota, a suburb southwest of Minneapolis. It is a private club and therefore closed to guests not accompanied by a member. The golf course was designed by Robert Trent Jones and opened in 1962.

Hazeltine also hosts functions other than golf; its clubhouse has a ballroom and two restaurants.

== History ==
Totton P. Heffelfinger, a former president of the United States Golf Association (USGA), saw the opportunity to build a new championship golf course after The Minikahda Club in Minneapolis (where Chick Evans won the 1916 U.S. Open) was threatened by the development of a freeway. After that club rejected plans for a new course, Heffelfinger met with Robert Trent Jones to design the golf course.

The course was originally named "The Executive Golf Club" and was initially intended to be part of a series of Executive Golf Clubs around the country. However, the name was not favorable and the other clubs did not materialize. The founders decided to call the new course Hazeltine National Golf club in honor of the adjoining Lake Hazeltine. The course opened for play to club members in 1962. Heffelfinger's ultimate goal was to have major championships played at Hazeltine. His wish was fulfilled when the 1966 U.S. Women's Open was played at Hazeltine; Sandra Spuzich won with a score of 297 (nine over par) on a course set to 6,305 yards (5,765 m).

Hazeltine hosted the U.S. Open in 1970 and the course received much negative press as nearly half the field did not break 80 on the first day. The weather had been very cool and windy. After his round on Friday, Dave Hill said that the only thing Hazeltine was missing was "80 acres of corn and a few cows." Tony Jacklin (that year's reigning Open Championship winner) won the tournament with a seven-under-par 281. The course played to 7,151 yards (6,539 m) and Hill placed second.

After that, the club faced severe financial troubles. The club almost secured a deal to host a PGA Championship, but ultimately lost the opportunity. However, the course was awarded the U.S. Women's Open for 1977. This was the first year that Nancy Lopez played in the championship as a professional, and she placed second. Hollis Stacy won the event with a four-over-par score of 292 on a course set at 6,313 yards (5,773 m).

Over the next few years, the course received a series of renovations. A number of dogleg holes were straightened. The par three sixteenth hole was abandoned and a new par four was laid out along Hazeltine Lake. The par four seventeenth was converted to a par three, keeping the original green site. The 1983 U.S. Senior Open was held at the redesigned course. Billy Casper and Rod Funseth were tied after four rounds with scores of four-over-par 288 (the course played as a par 71). After he and Funseth were still tied at the end of an 18-hole playoff, Casper made a birdie on the first hole of sudden death to win. The course played to 6,625 yards (6,058 m).

The course was awarded the 1991 U.S. Open in January 1986. Rees Jones, the son of Robert Trent Jones, made more changes to the course in preparation for the U.S. Open. The U.S. Open was remembered for the dramatic duel between Payne Stewart and Scott Simpson, who both finished at six-under-par 282. In the 18-hole playoff, Stewart was two strokes behind coming to the 16th hole. Then, as he had on Sunday, he rallied and won the U.S. Open for his second major championship win (and the first of his two U.S. Opens). Stewart made 57 pars during the 72 holes of regulation.

The 1991 U.S. Open is also remembered because of lightning that struck on Thursday, June 13, the first day of the championship. The day started out with bright blue skies, but a rainstorm soon came in. Spectators left the course or stood under trees for shelter. Six spectators stood under a tree near the famous sixteenth hole when lightning struck, with one fatality.

In 1994, the course hosted the U.S. Mid-Amateur Championship, one of the major events in amateur golf. In that competition, Tim Jackson defeated Tommy Brennan with a final score of one up (the Mid-Amateur final is held at match play). The course measured at 6,700 yards (6,126 m) for that championship. In 2001 another amateur event, the USGA Men's State Team Championship, was held at Hazeltine. John Carlson, Jered Gusso, and John Harris comprised the Minnesota team which won that event with an even-par score of 432. The course played at 6,818 yards (6,234 m).

Hazeltine also hosted the 1999 NCAA Division I Men's Championship. The Georgia Bulldogs won the team tournament with a twenty-seven-over-par score of 1179. Northwestern Wildcats golfer Luke Donald won the individual championship with a four-under-par score of 284. The course played to 7,196 yards (6,580 m).

Rees Jones lengthened tees and added several new bunkers in preparation for the 84th PGA Championship in 2002. The course played at 7,360 yards (6,730 m) as a par 72. Rich Beem was the winner of the championship, with a score of ten-under-par 278, holding off a surging Tiger Woods, who birdied the last four holes. The course's competitive course record was set in the 2002 PGA Championship as Beem, Robert Allenby, and Justin Leonard all shot 66 (six-under-par) during the second round.

In 2006 the course hosted the U.S. Amateur, which was won by Richie Ramsay of Scotland by defeating John Kelly of USA with a score of 4 & 2.

Hazeltine again played host to the PGA Championship in 2009. The tournament was won by Y.E. Yang of South Korea. Yang prevailed by three strokes over Tiger Woods, who had led by two going into Sunday. Yang's victory was significant, as it was the first men's major won by a golfer born in Asia. It also marked the first (and only) time that Woods had lost a major after holding at least a share of first after 54 holes.

The 2016 Ryder Cup was awarded to Hazeltine in 2002 and was scheduled for September 27 – October 2. On February 24, 2015, Davis Love III was named captain for Team USA with Northern Ireland's Darren Clarke captaining Team Europe. The United States' 17–11 victory was their first victory in the event since 2008 at Valhalla and tied the record for the biggest American margin of victory on home soil set in 1979 at The Greenbrier, which was the first year that Great Britain and Ireland included continental Europe to create the current European team.

On March 26, 2018, Hazeltine National was announced as the host of the 2029 Ryder Cup. It will be the first American venue to host a second Ryder Cup.

In late June 2019, the club hosted, for the first time, the KPMG Women's PGA Championship. This event, established in the mid-1950s, is the second-oldest of the LPGA Tour's five major championships, and is conducted by the PGA of America.

On October 10, 2023, Hazeltine National was announced as the host of the 2026 KPMG Women's PGA Championship.

== Major tournaments hosted at Hazeltine National ==
Year	Tournament	Winner	Winning score	Margin of victory	Runner(s)-up	Winner's share ($)
1966	U.S. Women's Open	(United States) Sandra Spuzich	297 (+9)	1 stroke	(United States) Carol Mann	4,000
**1970**	U.S. Open	(England) Tony Jacklin	281 (−7)	7 strokes	(United States) Dave Hill	30,000
1977	U.S. Women's Open	(United States) Hollis Stacy	292 (+4)	2 strokes	(United States) Nancy Lopez	11,040
1983	U.S. Senior Open	(United States) Billy Casper	288 (+4)	Playoff	(United States) Rod Funseth	30,566
**1991**	U.S. Open	(United States) Payne Stewart	282 (−6)	Playoff	(United States) Scott Simpson	235,000
1994	U.S. Mid-Amateur	(United States) Tim Jackson	1 up		(United States) Tommy Brennan	—N/a
**2002**	PGA Championship	(United States) Rich Beem	278 (−10)	1 stroke	(United States) Tiger Woods	990,000
2006	U.S. Amateur	(Scotland) Richie Ramsay	4 & 2		(United States) John Kelly	—N/a
**2009**	PGA Championship	(South Korea) Y.E. Yang	280 (−8)	3 strokes	(United States) Tiger Woods	1,350,000
2016	Ryder Cup	United States	17−11		Europe	—N/a
2019	Women's PGA Championship	(Australia) Hannah Green	279 (−9)	1 stroke	(South Korea) Park Sung-hyun	577,500
2024	U.S. Amateur	(Spain) José Luis Ballester	2 up		(United States) Noah Kent	—N/a
2026	Women's PGA Championship	(South Korea) Ryu Hae-ran	275 (−13)	2 strokes	(South Korea) Ina Yoon	1,950,000

Bolded years are major championships on the PGA Tour

=== Future events ===
Year	Tournament	Dates
2029	Ryder Cup	September 21–23

== Course information ==
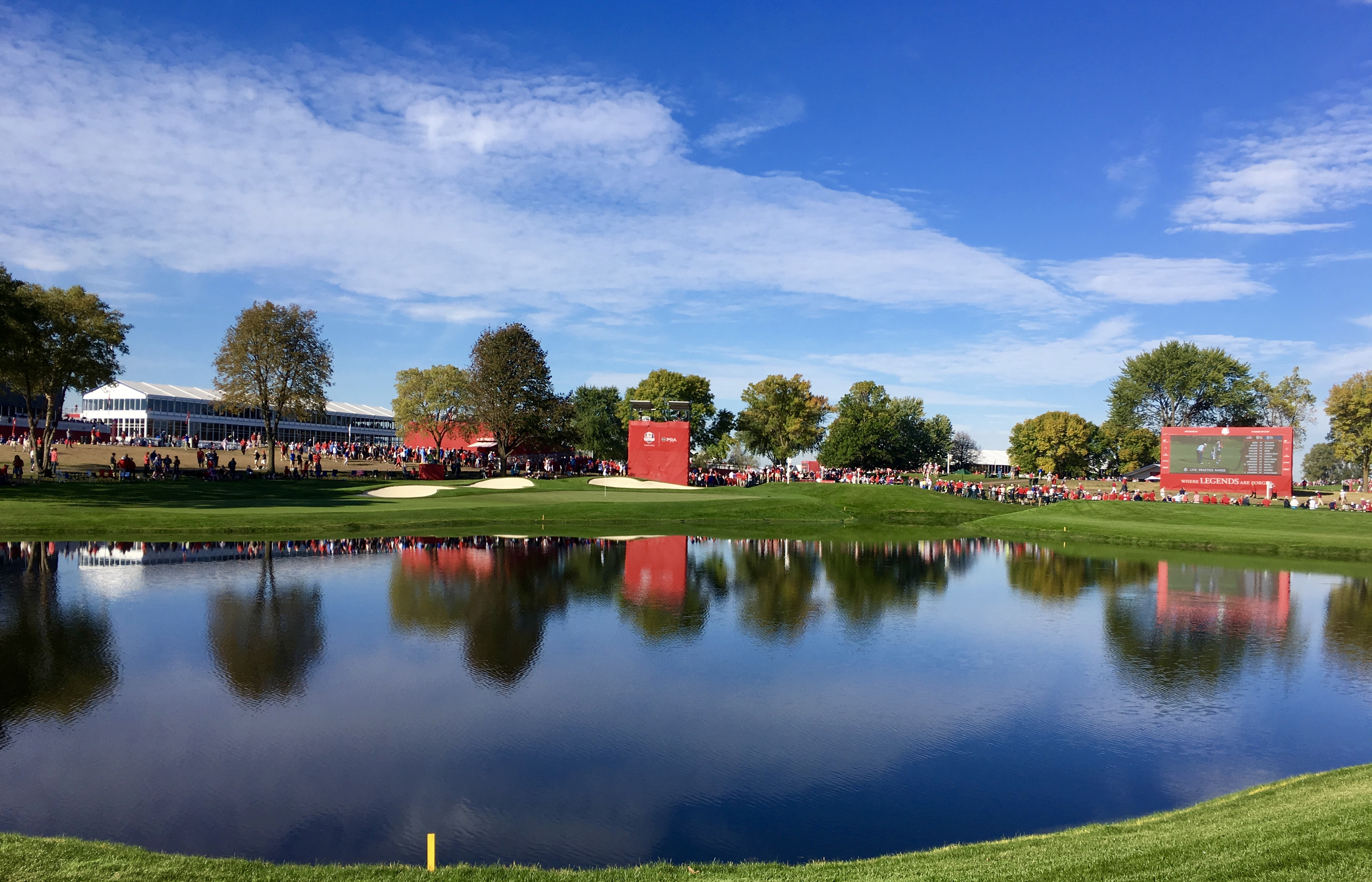
Hazeltine during the 2016 Ryder Cup

The golf course is hilly, and it has narrow fairways and small greens. Nine of the holes have water hazards. The signature hole at Hazeltine is the par four sixteenth. The tee shot on the sixteenth must carry 220 yards (201 m) over Hazeltine Lake. The green is a raised peninsula which falls off on all sides, including into the hazard in the back and on the right.

The seventeenth is a long par three that used to be a short par four. Four bunkers and two water hazards guard the green, which is one of the most undulating on the entire course. The finishing hole is a long, well-bunkered par four.

Keeping with the club's goal of improving the golf course as needed, a number of changes were made in the fall of 2005, including adding new tees (which will increase the length from the championship tees) and bunkers. The course was re-rated in 2006.

Prior to the changes, from the championship tees, the course measured 7,360 yards (6,730 m) and had a rating of 77.0/153. From the blue tees, the course measures 7,010 yards (6,410 m) and has a rating of 75.4/150. From the gold tees, the course measures 6,646 yards (6,077 m) and has a rating of 73.7/146. From the white tees, the course measures 6,204 yards (5,673 m) and has a rating of 71.8/142 for men and 77.2/144 for women. From the red tees, the course measures 5,690 yards (5,200 m) and has a rating of 74.3/138 for women.

During the 2008 summer, the club made many significant changes to the golf course in preparation for the 2009 PGA Championship. Some of these changes included adding bunkers onto the Par 4 2nd Hole; adding a new tee box on Hole 12, a par 4 which then played at almost 520 yards (480 m); and lengthening the course to 7,678 yards (7,021 m). The rating was 78.0, and the slope was listed as 155.

== Scorecard ==
Tee	Rating/Slope	1	2	3	4	5	6	7	8	9	Out	10	11	12	13	14	15	16	17	18	In	Total
Par		4	4	5	3	4	4	5	3	4	36	4	5	4	3	4	5	4	3	4	36	72
Tournament	M:77.8 / 148 W:85.4 / 155	490	431	633	210	448	405	572	176	432	3,797	452	606	518	248	352	642	402	182	475	3,877	7,674
Blue	M:75.9 / 144 W:83.0 / 152	442	425	568	205	400	380	562	168	425	3,573	424	570	445	198	352	575	380	182	438	3,564	7,137
Gold	M:73.3 / 140 W:79.9 / 146	412	384	560	186	382	368	512	144	389	3,337	404	550	420	174	328	538	352	156	406	3,328	6,665
White	M:71.2 / 135 W:77.3 / 140	390	368	522	160	365	345	494	124	379	3,144	378	515	374	166	310	525	312	135	362	3,077	6,221
Green	M:67.7 / 127 W:73.2 / 132	378	360	468	142	348	338	422	116	320	2,892	369	464	367	144	303	468	240	108	346	2809	5,701
Black	M:66.1 / 125 W:71.3 / 128	321	308	396	142	284	256	422	116	320	2,565	318	406	313	144	303	426	240	108	306	2,564	5,129
