= 2022 LPGA of Korea Tour =

The 2022 LPGA of Korea Tour was the 45th season of the LPGA of Korea Tour, the professional golf tour for women operated by the Korea Ladies Professional Golf Association.

== Schedule ==
Below is the schedule for the 2022 season. "Date" is the ending date for the tournament. The number in parentheses after winners' names show the player's total number wins in official money individual events on the LPGA of Korea Tour, including that event.

| Date | Tournament | Prize fund (KRW) | Winner | WWGR pts |
|---|---|---|---|---|
| 10 Apr | Lotte Rent-a-Car Women's Open | 700,000,000 | (South Korea) Jang Su-yeon (4) | 17.0 |
| 17 Apr | Mediheal Championship | 1,000,000,000 | (South Korea) Park Ji-young (4) | 19.0 |
| 24 Apr | Nexen Saint Nine Masters | 800,000,000 | (South Korea) Ryu Hae-ran (5) | 18.5 |
| 1 May | **Creas F&C KLPGA Championship** | 1,200,000,000 | (South Korea) Kim A-lim (3) | 26.0 |
| 8 May | Kyochon Honey Ladies Open | 800,000,000 | (South Korea) Cho A-yean (3) | 18.0 |
| 15 May | NH Investment & Securities Ladies Championship | 800,000,000 | (South Korea) Park Min-ji (11) | 19.0 |
| 22 May | Doosan Match Play Championship | 800,000,000 | (South Korea) Hong Jung-min (1) | 18.0 |
| 29 May | E1 Open | 800,000,000 | (South Korea) Jeong Yun-ji (1) | 17.0 |
| 5 Jun | Lotte Open | 800,000,000 | (South Korea) Sung Yu-jin (1) | 17.5 |
| 12 Jun | Celltrion Queens Masters | 1,000,000,000 | (South Korea) Park Min-ji (12) | 19.0 |
| 19 Jun | **DB Group Korea Women's Open Golf Championship** | 1,300,000,000 | (South Korea) Lim Hee-jeong (5) | 26.0 |
| 26 Jun | BC Card Hankyung Ladies Cup | 700,000,000 | (South Korea) Park Min-ji (13) | 19.0 |
| 3 Jul | McCol Mona Park Open | 800,000,000 | (South Korea) Im Jin-hee (2) | 16.5 |
| 10 Jul | Daebo HausD Open | 1,000,000,000 | (South Korea) Song Ga-eun (2) | 19.0 |
| 17 Jul | EverCollagen Queens Crown | 800,000,000 | (South Korea) Yoon Ina (1) | 18.5 |
| 24 Jul | Hoban Women's Classic | 1,000,000,000 | (South Korea) Cho A-yean (4) | 19.0 |
| 7 Aug | Jeju Samdasoo Masters | 900,000,000 | (South Korea) Ji Han-sol (3) | 18.0 |
| 14 Aug | Dayou Winia – MBN Ladies Open | 800,000,000 | (South Korea) Lee So-young (6) | 18.5 |
| 21 Aug | High1 Resort Ladies Open | 800,000,000 | (South Korea) Han Jin-seon (1) | 18.5 |
| 28 Aug | **Hanwha Championship** | 1,400,000,000 | (South Korea) Hong Ji-won (1) | 19.0 |
| 4 Sep | KG Edaily Ladies Open | 700,000,000 | (South Korea) Hwang Jeong-mee (1) | 18.5 |
| 18 Sep | **KB Financial Group Star Championship** | 1,200,000,000 | (South Korea) Park Min-ji (14) | 19.0 |
| 25 Sep | OK Financial Group Se-ri Pak Invitational | 800,000,000 | (South Korea) Kim Su-ji (3) | 19.5 |
| 2 Oct | Hana Financial Group Championship | 1,500,000,000 | (South Korea) Kim Su-ji (4) | 20.5 |
| 9 Oct | **Hite Jinro Championship** | 1,200,000,000 | (South Korea) Park Min-ji (15) | 19.0 |
| 16 Oct | Dongbu Construction Koreit Championship | 1,000,000,000 | (South Korea) Lee Ga-young (1) | 18.5 |
| 23 Oct | Wemix Championship | 1,000,000,000 | (South Korea) You Hyo-ju (1) | 18.5 |
| 30 Oct | SK Networks Seoul Economics Ladies Classic | 800,000,000 | (South Korea) Lee So-mi (4) | 19.5 |
| 6 Nov | S-Oil Championship | 800,000,000 | (South Korea) Lee So-mi (5) | 19.0 |
| 13 Nov | SK Shieldus SK Telecom Championship | 1,000,000,000 | (South Korea) Park Min-ji (16) | 19.0 |
| 11 Dec | Hana Financial Group Singapore Ladies Open | 1,000,000,000 | (South Korea) Park Ji-young (5) | 19.5 |
| 18 Dec | PLK PacificLinks Korea Championship | 700,000,000 | (South Korea) Lee Jung-min (2) | 16.0 |

Events in bold are majors.
