= Dewi Weber =

Dutch professional golfer (born 1996)

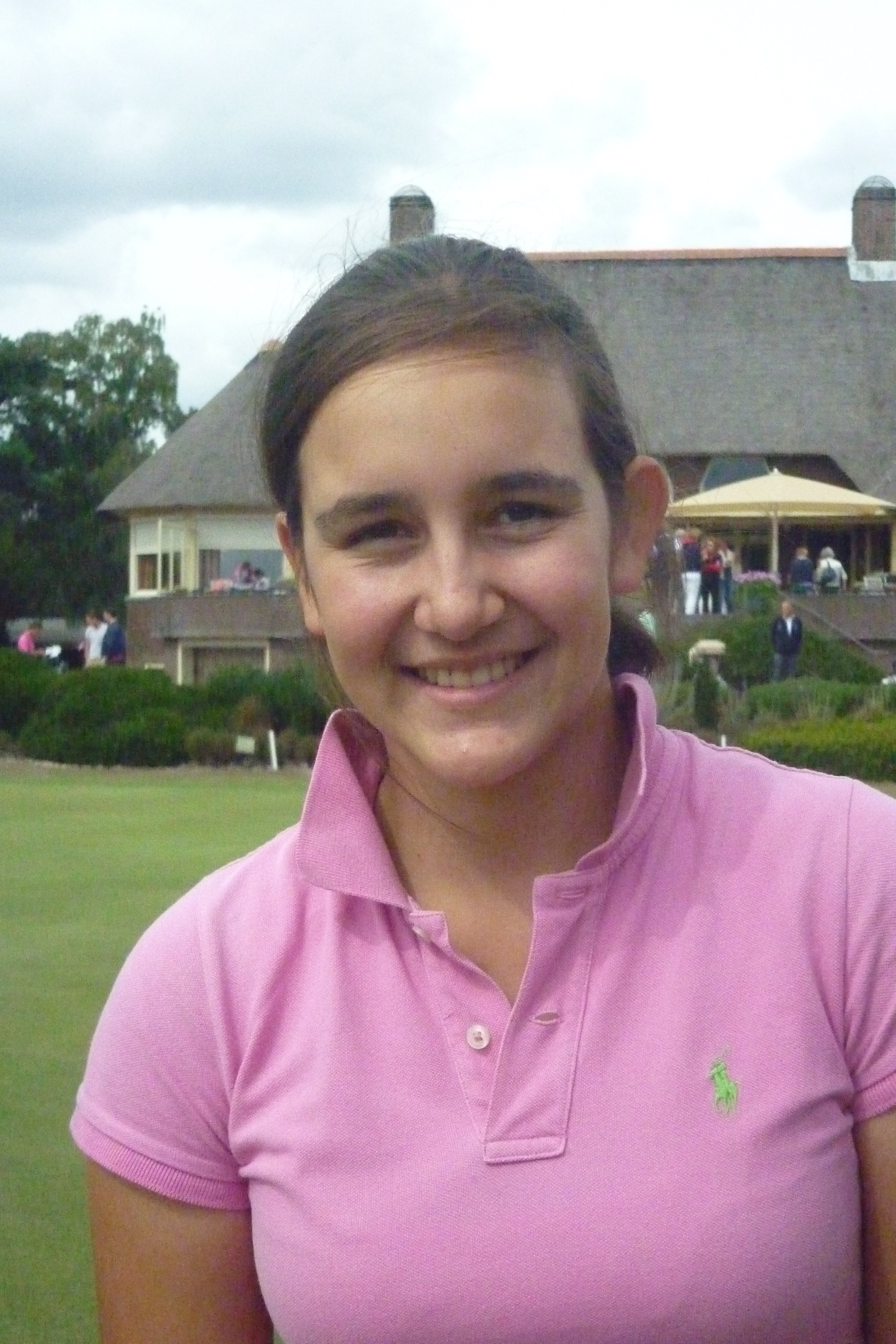
- Weber in 2013

Personal information
- Nationality: Netherlands
- Born: 12 June 1996 (age 30) Groningen, Netherlands
- Height: 5 ft 8 in (173 cm)
- Spouse: Jentrie (m. 2024)

Career
- Sport: Golf
- College: University of Miami
- Turned professional: 2019
- Current tour: LPGA Tour
- Former tour: Epson Tour

Best results in LPGA major championships
- Chevron Championship: T30: 2025
- Women's PGA C'ship: T3: 2026
- U.S. Women's Open: CUT: 2023, 2026
- Women's British Open: T44: 2026
- Evian Championship: CUT: 2025, 2026

Dewi Weber (born 12 June 1996) is a Dutch professional golfer playing on the LPGA Tour.

== Amateur career ==
Weber was a tennis player in her youth. She played internationally for 2 years, but got injured at 12. That is when she took up golf. By the age of 14, she was selected for the Dutch National Team, and started playing international junior tournaments. In 2012, she represented the Netherlands at the European Young Masters and the European Girls' Team Championship. She played in six European Ladies' Team Championships between 2013 and 2018.

She has also represented the Netherlands in two World Amateur Team Championships, the 2014 Espirito Santo Trophy in Japan and the 2016 Espirito Santo Trophy in Mexico. She played in the 2017 Vagliano Trophy and represented the International team at the 2018 Arnold Palmer Cup.

Weber enrolled at University of Miami in 2015 and played with Miami Hurricanes women's golf. As a freshman, she tied for second behind Virginia Elena Carta at the 2016 NCAA Championship in Eugene, Oregon, finishing with a four-round total of 280 (−8).

In 2016, she lost the final of the British Ladies Amateur against Julia Engström on the 19th hole.

== Professional career ==
Weber turned professional and joined the Symetra Tour in 2019. Over three seasons, she recorded 12 top-10 finishes, with her career-best result a solo fourth at the 2020 Mission Inn Resort and Club Championship.

She earned her card for the 2022 LPGA Tour through qualifying school.

In May 2023, she won the 36-hole local qualifying at Novato, California, among 75 competitors, for her first appearance at the U.S. Women's Open, which took place at Pebble Beach Golf Links in July 2023.

Weber enjoyed a breakthrough at the 2026 Women's PGA Championship at Hazeltine National Golf Club, where she tied for third alongside Brooke Henderson. That finish earned her over $750,000, doubling her career LPGA Tour earnings. She also rose into the top-100 of the Women's World Golf Rankings for the first time.

== Amateur wins ==
- 2013 Dutch National Strokeplay Championship, Netherlands U21 Match Play
- 2014 Dutch Brabants Open
- 2015 Dutch National Strokeplay Championship, European Nations Cup (Individual)
- 2016 Dutch National Strokeplay Championship, Dutch Brabants Open, Mary Fossum Invitational, Betsy Rawls Longhorn Invitational
- 2018 UCF Challenge

== Results in LPGA majors ==
Results not in chronological order.

| Tournament | 2022 | 2023 | 2024 | 2025 | 2026 |
|---|---|---|---|---|---|
| Chevron Championship | | T61 | | T30 | CUT |
| U.S. Women's Open | | CUT | | | CUT |
| Women's PGA Championship | CUT | CUT | | T31 | T3 |
| The Evian Championship | | | | CUT | CUT |
| Women's British Open | | | | CUT | T44 |

Top 10
Did not play

CUT = missed the half-way cut
"T" = tied

== Team appearances ==
Amateur

- European Young Masters (representing the Netherlands): 2012
- European Girls' Team Championship (representing the Netherlands): 2012
- European Ladies' Team Championship (representing the Netherlands): 2013, 2014, 2015, 2016, 2017, 2018
- Espirito Santo Trophy (representing the Netherlands): 2014, 2016
- Vagliano Trophy (representing the continent of Europe): 2017
- Arnold Palmer Cup (representing the International team): 2018
