= 2021 LPGA of Korea Tour =

The 2021 LPGA of Korea Tour was the 44th season of the LPGA of Korea Tour, the professional golf tour for women operated by the Korea Ladies Professional Golf' Association.

== Schedule ==
Below is the schedule for the 2021 season. "Date" is the ending date for the tournament. The number in parentheses after winners' names show the player's total number wins in official money individual events on the LPGA of Korea Tour, including that event.

Date	Tournament	Prize fund (KRW)	Winner	WWGR pts	Notes
11 Apr	Lotte Rent a Car Ladies Open	700,000,000	(South Korea) Lee So-mi (2)	19.0	
25 Apr	Nexen Saint Nine Masters	800,000,000	(South Korea) Park Min-ji (5)	19.0	
2 May	**CreaS F&C KLPGA Championship**	1,000,000,000	(South Korea) Park Hyun-kyung (3)	19.0	
9 May	Kyochon Honey Ladies Open	600,000,000	(South Korea) Kwak Bo-mi (1)	18.5	
16 May	NH Investment & Securities Ladies Championship	700,000,000	(South Korea) Park Min-ji (6)	19.0	
23 May	Doosan Match Play Championship	800,000,000	(South Korea) Park Min-ji (7)	19.0	
30 May	E1 Charity Open	800,000,000	(South Korea) Ji Han-sol (2)	19.0	
6 Jun	Lotte Open	800,000,000	(South Korea) Jang Ha-na (14)	18.5	
13 Jun	Celltrion Queens Masters	800,000,000	(South Korea) Park Min-ji (8)	18.0	
20 Jun	**DB Group Korea Women's Open Golf Championship**	1,200,000,000	(South Korea) Park Min-ji (9)	19.0	
27 Jun	BC Card Hankyung Ladies Cup	700,000,000	(South Korea) Im Jin-hee (1)	18.0	
4 Jul	McCol Mona Park Open	800,000,000	(South Korea) Kim Hae-rym (7)	18.0	
11 Jul	Daebo hausD Open	1,000,000,000	(South Korea) Park Min-ji (10)	19.0	
18 Jul	EverCollagen Queens Crown	800,000,000	(South Korea) Jun Ye-sung (1)	19.0	
1 Aug	Jeju Samdasoo Masters	900,000,000	(South Korea) Oh Ji-hyun (7)	17.5	
15 Aug	DayouWinia MBN Ladies Open	800,000,000	(South Korea) Lee So-mi (3)	19.0	
22 Aug	National Shelter-High1 Resort Ladies Open	800,000,000	(South Korea) Lim Hee-jeong (4)	19.0	
29 Aug	**Hanwha Classic**	1,400,000,000	(South Korea) Lee Da-yeon (6)	19.0	
5 Sep	KG Edaily Ladies Open	600,000,000	(South Korea) Kim Su-ji (1)	18.0	
12 Sep	**KB Financial Group Star Championship**	1,200,000,000	(South Korea) Jang Ha-na (15)	20.5	
19 Sep	OKSavingsBank Se Ri Pak Invitational	800,000,000	(South Korea) Kim Hyo-joo (13)	19.0	
26 Sep	ELCRU-TV Chosun Pro Celebrity	600,000,000	(South Korea) Ryu Hae-ran (3)	16.5	
3 Oct	Hana Financial Group Championship	1,500,000,000	(South Korea) Song Ga-eun (1)	20.5	
10 Oct	**Hite Jinro Championship**	1,000,000,000	(South Korea) Kim Su-ji (2)	19.0	
17 Oct	Dongbu Construction KOREIT Championship	1,000,000,000	(South Korea) Lee Jung-min (1)	18.5	
24 Oct	BMW Ladies Championship	US$2,000,000	(South Korea) Ko Jin-young (12)	40.0	Co-sanctioned with LPGA Tour
31 Oct	SK Networks Seokyung Ladies Classic	800,000,000	(South Korea) Kim Hyo-joo (14)	19.5	
7 Nov	S-Oil Championship	700,000,000	(South Korea) Park Ji-young (3)	19.0	
14 Nov	SK Shieldus-SK Telecom Championship	1,000,000,000	(South Korea) Ryu Hae-ran (4)	19.0	

Events in bold are majors.
