= Dow Championship =

Women's golf tournament

Coordinates: 43.3656°N 84.1450°W

Tournament information
- Location: Midland, Michigan, U.S.
- Established: 2019
- Course: Midland Country Club
- Par: 70
- Length: 6,287 yards (5,749 m)
- Tour: LPGA Tour
- Format: Team stroke play – 72 holes
- Prize fund: $3.3 million
- Month played: June

Tournament record score
- Aggregate: 253 Clanton & Suwannapura (2019)
- To par: −27 as above

Current champion
- (South Korea) Im Jin-hee and (South Korea) Lee So-mi

Location in the United States
Location in Michigan

The Dow Championship is a women's professional golf tournament on the LPGA Tour that is played in Michigan. A new event in 2019, it is held at Midland Country Club in Midland, Michigan. It is a team event, similar to the Zurich Classic of New Orleans on the PGA Tour, with alternate shot (foursome) in the first and third rounds and better ball (fourball) for the second and fourth rounds. Dow Chemical Company is the title sponsor.

The 2020 edition was canceled due to the COVID-19 pandemic. For the 2021 edition, the purse was increased to $2.3 million, with the first-place team splitting $559,000.

For 2022, the purse was increased to $2.5 million, with the first-place team splitting $603,172.

In 2023, the 70 two-woman teams are set featuring foursomes and fourballs in alternating days, including a 36-hole cut, to determine the winning team. The purse was increased to $2.7 million, with the first-place team splitting $656,230.

== Winners ==
Year	Date	Players	Country	Winning score	To par	Margin of victory	Purse ($)	Winner's share ($)
Dow Championship
2025	Jun 29	Im Jin-hee and Lee So-mi	South Korea; South Korea	67-63-68-62=260	−20	Playoff	3,300,000	399,510 (each)
2024	Jun 30	Atthaya Thitikul and Yin Ruoning	Thailand; China	64-66-66-62=258	−22	1 stroke	3,000,000	366,082 (each)
Dow Great Lakes Bay Invitational
2023	Jul 22	Cheyenne Knight and Elizabeth Szokol	United States; United States	69-61-62-65=257	−23	1 stroke	2,700,000	328,115 (each)
2022	Jul 16	Jennifer Kupcho and Lizette Salas	United States; United States	68-61-64-61=254	−26	5 strokes	2,500,000	301,586 (each)
2021	Jul 17	Ariya Jutanugarn and Moriya Jutanugarn	Thailand; Thailand	67-59-71-59=256	−24	3 strokes	2,300,000	279,500 (each)
2020	Canceled due to the COVID-19 pandemic							
2019	Jul 20	Cydney Clanton and Thidapa Suwannapura	United States; Thailand	67-64-63-59=253	−27	6 strokes	2,000,000	241,269 (each)
