= Black Desert Championship (LPGA) =

Golf tournament in Utah

Tournament information
- Location: Ivins, Utah
- Established: 2023
- Course: Black Desert Resort
- Par: 72
- Length: 6,629 yards (6,062 m)
- Tour(s): LPGA Tour (2025); Epson Tour (2023)
- Format: Stroke play
- Prize fund: $3,000,000
- Final year: 2025

Final champion
- (South Korea) Ryu Hae-ran

The Black Desert Championship was a tournament on the LPGA Tour, having previously featured on the Epson Tour, the LPGA's developmental tour, where it was a part of the tour's schedule in 2023. The event was discontinued after the 2025 playing.

The 2023 tournament was held at the Soldier Hollow Golf Course and won by Nataliya Guseva.

The 2025 tournament was played at Black Desert Resort and won by Ryu Hae-ran.

== Winners ==
Year	Tour	Winner	Country	Score	Margin of victory	Runners-up	Purse ($)	Winner's share ($)
Black Desert Championship
2025	LPGA	Ryu Hae-ran	South Korea	262 (−26)	5 strokes	(Germany) Esther Henseleit, (China) Yin Ruoning	3,000,000	450,000
2024: No tournament
Black Desert Resort Championship
2023	EPS	Nataliya Guseva	Russia	198 (−18)	2 strokes	(United States) Jenny Coleman, (United States) Mariel Galdiano (France) Agathe Laisné, (Italy) Roberta Liti	375,000	56,250

== See also ==
- Black Desert Championship
