= Lee So-mi =

South Korean professional golfer (born 1999)

Personal information
- Nationality: South Korea
- Born: 6 January 1999 (age 27)
- Height: 5 ft 4 in (163 cm)

Career
- Sport: Golf
- Turned professional: 2017
- Current tour: LPGA Tour
- Former tour: LPGA of Korea Tour
- Professional wins: 6

Number of wins by tour
- LPGA Tour: 1
- LPGA of Korea Tour: 5

Best results in LPGA major championships
- Chevron Championship: T24: 2025
- Women's PGA C'ship: T8: 2025
- U.S. Women's Open: T33: 2023
- Women's British Open: T22: 2024
- Evian Championship: T10: 2026

Lee So-mi (Korean: 이소미, born 6 January 1999), also known as Somi Lee, is a South Korean professional golfer. Lee has five professional wins on the LPGA of Korea Tour. She joined the LPGA Tour in 2024.

== Early life and amateur career ==
Lee is from Wando, South Korea. As an amateur in 2017, she won the New South Wales Women's Amateur Championship and was runner-up at the Australian Women's Amateur. She was also on the winning team at the Queen Sirikit Cup.

== Professional career ==
Lee became a professional in 2017, joining the LPGA of Korea Tour. Lee recorded her first professional win in 2020 at the Huencare Ladies Open.

In 2021, she had two professional wins on the LPGA of Korea Tour, the Dayouwinia MBN Ladies Open and the Lotte Rent A Car Ladies Open.

In 2022, Lee made her U.S. Women's Open debut after being ranked within the top 75 in the world in the Rolex Rankings. She would finish tied for 44th in the tournament. That year she would have two more wins on the LPGA of Korea Tour, at the SK Networks Seoul Economics Ladies Championship and the S-Oil Championship.

Lee finished the 2023 LPGA Q-Series tied for second place, earning her LPGA Tour card for 2024. In 2024, Lee joined the LPGA tour.

In 2025, Lee competed with an "empty hat" after losing sponsor support. Despite this, Lee's performances stood out, when she placed second in the PIF Saudi Ladies International event, after leading for much of the event. That year, Lee opened the Black Desert Championship, with a 6-under 66, rocketing her to the top of the leaderboard. She finished the event in 18th place. In June, Lee placed third in the 2025 Meijer LPGA Classic, two strokes behind the winner, Carlota Ciganda.

== Professional wins (6) ==
=== LPGA of Korea Tour wins (5) ===
- 2020 HUENCARE Ladies Open
- 2021 Lotte Rent a Car Ladies Open, DayouWinia MBN Ladies Open
- 2022 SK Networks Seoul Economics Ladies Classic, S-Oil Championship

=== LPGA Tour wins (1) ===
No.	Date	Tournament	Winning score	To par	Margin of victory	Runners-up
1	29 Jun 2025	Dow Championship (with (South Korea) Im Jin-hee)	67-63-68-62=260	−20	Playoff	(United States) Megan Khang and (United States) Lexi Thompson

LPGA Tour playoff record (1–0)

No.	Year	Tournament	Opponents	Result
1	2025	Dow Championship (with (South Korea) Im Jin-hee)	(United States) Megan Khang and (United States) Lexi Thompson	Won with birdie on first extra hole

== Results in LPGA majors ==
Results not in chronological order

Tournament	2022	2023	2024	2025	2026
Chevron Championship			CUT	T24	T34
U.S. Women's Open	T44	T33	CUT		T40
Women's PGA Championship			CUT	T8	T19
The Evian Championship		CUT	T17	T14	T10
Women's British Open			T22	CUT	CUT

Top 10
Did not play

CUT = missed the half-way cut
"T" = tied

=== Summary ===
Tournament	Wins	2nd	3rd	Top-5	Top-10	Top-25	Events	Cuts made
Chevron Championship	0	0	0	0	0	1	3	2
U.S. Women's Open	0	0	0	0	0	0	4	3
Women's PGA Championship	0	0	0	0	1	2	3	2
The Evian Championship	0	0	0	0	1	3	4	3
Women's British Open	0	0	0	0	0	1	3	1
Totals	0	0	0	0	2	7	17	11

- Most consecutive cuts made – 5 (2024 Evian – 2025 Evian)
- Longest streak of top-10s – 1 (twice)

== Team appearances representing South Korea ==
Amateur

- Queen Sirikit Cup: 2017 (winners)
