= Im Jin-hee =

South Korean professional golfer (born 1998)

Personal information
- Nationality: South Korea
- Born: 24 May 1998 (age 28) Jeju Province, South Korea
- Height: 5 ft 5 in (165 cm)

Career
- Sport: Golf
- Turned professional: 2016
- Current tour: LPGA Tour
- Former tour: LPGA of Korea Tour
- Professional wins: 7

Number of wins by tour
- LPGA Tour: 1
- LPGA of Korea Tour: 6

Best results in LPGA major championships
- Chevron Championship: 8th: 2024
- Women's PGA C'ship: CUT: 2024, 2025, 2026
- U.S. Women's Open: T12: 2024
- Women's British Open: T10: 2024
- Evian Championship: T4: 2026

Korean name
- Hangul: 임진희
- RR: Im Jinhui
- MR: Im Chinhŭi

Im Jin-hee (Korean: 임진희; born 24 May 1998), also known as Jin Hee Im, is a South Korean professional golfer. Hee Im turned professional in 2016, playing on the LPGA of Korea Tour, where she won six times. She debuted on the LPGA Tour in 2024, and was named runner-up for the Tour's Rookie of the Year.

== Biography ==
Im grew up in Guri, South Korea. She turned professional in 2016, starting as a rookie on the LPGA of Korea Tour. In 2021, she had her first tournament win in the BC Card Hankyung Ladies Open. In 2023, she recorded four tournament wins for the season. Her 2023 season advanced her to the LPGA Q-Series to qualify for the LPGA Tour.

Im qualified for the 2024 LPGA Tour in December 2023, after finishing in the top of the Q-Series. After narrowly missing out on the KLPGA Rookie of the year award during her rookie season in Korea, Im committed herself to the achievement for the 2024 season. During the 2024 season, Im made it to the top-10 six times during the tour season, across 24 starts. She would eventually be runner-up to Mao Saigo in the Louise Suggs Rolex Rookie of the Year.

In 2025, Im's points from the CME Group Tour Championship earned her a berth in the 2025 U.S. Women's Open. Prior to the tournament, Im was ranked 31 in the world.

== Professional wins (7) ==
=== LPGA of Korea Tour wins (6) ===
- 2021 (1) BC Card Hankyung Ladies Cup
- 2022 (1) McCol Mona Park Open
- 2023 (4) NH Investment & Securities Ladies Championship, Jeju Samdasoo Masters, Sangsangin-Hankyung TV Open, SK Shieldus-SK Telecom Championship

=== LPGA Tour wins (1) ===
No.	Date	Tournament	Winning score	To par	Margin of victory	Runners-up
1	29 Jun 2025	Dow Championship (with (South Korea) Lee So-mi)	67-63-68-62=260	−20	Playoff	(United States) Megan Khang and (United States) Lexi Thompson

LPGA Tour playoff record (1–1)

No.	Year	Tournament	Opponents	Result
1	2025	Dow Championship (with (South Korea) Lee So-mi)	(United States) Megan Khang and (United States) Lexi Thompson	Won with birdie on first extra hole
2	2026	JM Eagle LA Championship	(Australia) Hannah Green (South Korea) Kim Sei-young	Green won with birdie on first extra hole

== Results in LPGA majors ==
Tournament	2024	2025	2026
Chevron Championship	8	T74	T21
U.S. Women's Open	T12	T51	T19
Women's PGA Championship	CUT	CUT	CUT
The Evian Championship	CUT	T38	T4
Women's British Open	T10	T23	T16

Top 10
Did not play

CUT = missed the half-way cut
"T" = tied
