= Seo Kyo-rim =

South Korean professional golfer (born 2006

Personal information
- Nationality: South Korea
- Born: August 2006 (age 20)
- Height: 173 cm (5 ft 8 in)

Career
- Sport: Golf
- Turned professional: 2024
- Current tour: LPGA of Korea Tour
- Professional wins: 4

Number of wins by tour
- LPGA of Korea Tour: 4

Best results in LPGA major championships
- Chevron Championship: DNP
- Women's PGA C'ship: DNP
- U.S. Women's Open: DNP
- Women's British Open: DNP
- Evian Championship: CUT: 2026

Achievements and awards
- LPGA of Korea Tour Rookie of the Year: 2025

Seo Kyo-rim is a South Korean professional golfer. She plays on the LPGA of Korea Tour. In June 2026, Seo was ranked 45th in the world in the Women's World Golf Rankings.

== Amateur career ==
In junior competition, Seo placed sixth at the 2023 Asia-Pacific Golf Confederation (APGC) Junior Championships in the Philippines. That year, she placed 10th at the Women's Amateur Asia-Pacific competition, and 20th at the Queen Sirikit Cup. In October, she represented South Korea for the Espirito Santo Trophy event in Abu Dhabi. South Korea placed first, and Seo placed third individually.

== Professional career ==
Seo turned professional in 2024, joining the Dream Tour. The next year, she joined the LPGA of Korea Tour. In 2025, she was named KLPGA Rookie of the Year. She won the award despite not winning on the tour.

In June 2026, Seo won her first professional victory at the Celltrion Queens Masters tournament. She was 20 years old. Two weeks later, she won the Incar Financial The Heaven Masters tournament. The victory brought her to number 45 on the Women's World Golf Rankings.

== Amateur wins ==
- 2022 Kakao VX Maekyung Amateur Championship, National Sports Festival
- 2024 Club D Amateur Championship

== Professional wins (4) ==
=== LPGA of Korea Tour wins (4) ===
- 2026 Celltrion Queens Masters, Incar Financial The Heaven Masters, Mediheal Hankook Ilbo Championship, **BC Card-Hankyung KLPGA Championship**

Tournaments in bold denotes major tournaments in LPGA of Korea Tour.

== Results in LPGA majors ==
Tournament	2026
Chevron Championship	
U.S. Women's Open	
Women's PGA Championship	
The Evian Championship	CUT
Women's British Open	

Did not play

CUT = missed the half-way cut
T = tied

== Team appearances ==
Amateur

- Espirito Santo Trophy (representing South Korea): 2023 (winners)
- Queen Sirikit Cup (representing South Korea): 2023 (winners)
