= Roberta Liti =

Italian professional golfer (born c.1995)

Personal information
- Nationality: Italy
- Born: 2 July 1995 (age 31) Siena, Italy
- Height: 5 ft 7 in (170 cm)

Career
- Sport: Golf
- College: Arizona State University
- Turned professional: 2018
- Current tours: Ladies European Tour (joined 2026); Epson Tour (joined 2020)
- Former tour: LPGA Tour (joined 2023)

Achievements and awards
- NCAA Elite 90 Award: 2018
- Pac-12 Conference Women's Golf Scholar-Athlete of the Year: 2018

Roberta Liti (born c. 1995) is an Italian professional golfer who has played on the LPGA Tour and now plays on the Ladies European Tour. As an amateur she won the 2017 NCAA Championship with Arizona State.

== Amateur career ==
Liti competed in the 2012 and 2014 World Amateur Team Championship for the Espirito Santo Trophy as a member of the Italian National Team, and appeared for the team in over ten European Championships, collecting a silver medal at the 2017 European Ladies' Team Championship.

Liti tied for 3rd at the 2010 Italian National Stroke Play Championship, and lost the final of the 2011 Italian National Match Play Championship. She was runner-up at the Italian Girls U 18 Championship in 2012, and won in 2013. She placed third in the 2013 Ladies' British Open Amateur Stroke Play Championship.

Liti played collegiate golf at Arizona State University from 2014 to 2018 with the Arizona State Sun Devils women's golf team. She helped win the 2017 NCAA Division I women's golf championship and was named 2018 Pac-12 Women's Golf Scholar-Athlete of the Year and won the 2018 NCAA Elite 90 Award.

== Professional career ==
Liti turned professional in December 2018 and joined the Symetra Tour in 2020. Her best finish in her rookie season was a tie for 5th at the Symetra Classic. In 2021, she had a season-best tied 6th at the Casino Del Sol Golf Classic, and finished tied 7th at the Ladies Italian Open. In 2023, she recorded six top-10 finishes including runner-up at the Black Desert Resort Championship, to finish eighth in the season rankings and earn LPGA Tour membership for the 2024 season.

In 2024, her rookie LPGA Tour season, she made 7 cuts in 18 starts and finished 151st in the season rankings. Back on the Epson Tour for 2025, she finished 39th in the season rankings.

Liti earned her card for the 2026 Ladies European Tour at Q-School.

== Amateur wins ==
- 2013 Italian Girls U18 Championship
- 2017 PING ASU Invitational

== Team appearances ==
Amateur

- European Young Masters (representing Italy): 2011
- Duke of York Young Champions Trophy (representing Italy): 2011, 2013
- European Nations Cup – Copa Sotogrande (representing Italy): 2012, 2013
- Espirito Santo Trophy (representing Italy): 2012, 2014
- European Girls' Team Championship (representing Italy): 2011, 2012, 2013
- European Ladies' Team Championship (representing Italy): 2014, 2015, 2016, 2017, 2018
