= JM Eagle LA Championship =

Women's professional golf tournament

Coordinates: 34.0772°N 118.3275°W

Tournament information
- Location: Los Angeles, California, U.S.
- Established: 2023
- Course: Wilshire Country Club
- Par: 71
- Length: 6,258 yards (5,722 m)
- Tour: LPGA Tour
- Format: Stroke play – 72 holes
- Prize fund: $4.75 million
- Month played: April

Tournament record score
- Aggregate: 272 Hannah Green (2024)
- To par: −12 as above

Current champion
- (Australia) Hannah Green

Location in the United States
Location in California

The JM Eagle LA Championship is a women's professional golf tournament held in Los Angeles, California, United States as part of the LPGA Tour. A new event in 2023, it is played at Wilshire Country Club.

Wilshire Country Club hosted of the DIO Implant LA Open from 2018 to 2022, an event moved to Palos Verdes GC, making the JM Eagle LA Championship the second event to be played in the Los Angeles area on the 2023 LPGA Tour.

In Hancock Park, south of Hollywood and six miles (10 km) northwest of downtown, Wilshire was founded 107 years ago in 1919 and hosted the Los Angeles Open on the PGA Tour four times.

In 2025, the tournament was temporarily played at El Caballero Country Club while Wilshire Country Club, the tournament's regular home, underwent a year-long restoration.

== Winners ==
Year	Date	Champion	Winning score	To par	Margin of victory	Purse ($)	Winner's share ($)	Venue
2026	Apr 19	(Australia) Hannah Green (3)	67-69-67-68=271	−17	Playoff	4,750,000	712,500	El Caballero CC
2025	Apr 20	(Sweden) Ingrid Lindblad	68-63-68-68=267	−21	1 stroke	3,750,000	562,500	El Caballero CC
2024	Apr 28	(Australia) Hannah Green (2)	67-69-70-66=272	−12	3 strokes	3,750,000	562,500	Wilshire CC
2023	Apr 30	(Australia) Hannah Green	68-69-69-69=275	−9	Playoff	3,000,000	450,000	Wilshire CC

== Tournament records ==
Year	Player	Score	Round
2024	Im Jin-hee	63 (−8)	3rd
