= Kim A-lim =

South Korean professional golfer (born 1995)

Personal information
- Nationality: South Korea
- Born: 4 October 1995 (age 31)
- Height: 5 ft 9 in (175 cm)

Career
- Sport: Golf
- Turned professional: 2013
- Current tours: LPGA of Korea Tour; LPGA Tour
- Professional wins: 6

Number of wins by tour
- LPGA Tour: 3
- LPGA of Korea Tour: 3

Best results in LPGA major championships (wins: 1)
- Chevron Championship: T4: 2023
- Women's PGA C'ship: T8: 2026
- U.S. Women's Open: Won: 2020
- Women's British Open: T4: 2025
- Evian Championship: T3: 2023

Kim A-lim (Korean: 김아림, born 4 October 1995), also known as A Lim Kim, is a South Korean professional golfer who currently plays primarily on the LPGA Tour and the LPGA of Korea Tour.

Kim turned professional as a teenager in 2013 and began playing on the KLPGA in 2016. She has two wins on the tour, the first coming at the Pak Se-ri Invitational in October 2018. She also won the MY Munyoung Queens Park Championship in 2019 and finished 11th on the KLPGA money list that season.

In December 2020, Kim made her LPGA major championship debut in the 2020 U.S. Women's Open at Champions Golf Club in Houston, Texas. Entering the final round five shots off the lead, she birdied the last three holes to shoot 67 and won the tournament by one shot over Ko Jin-young and Amy Olson.

== Professional wins (6) ==
=== LPGA Tour wins (3) ===
Legend
Major championships (1)
Other LPGA Tour (2)

No.	Date	Tournament	Winning score	To par	Margin of victory	Runner(s)-up	Winner's share ($)
1	14 Dec 2020	U.S. Women's Open	68-74-72-67=281	−3	1 stroke	(South Korea) Ko Jin-young (United States) Amy Olson	1,000,000
2	9 Nov 2024	Lotte Championship	66-69-67-68=270	−18	2 strokes	(Russia) Nataliya Guseva	450,000
3	2 Feb 2025	Hilton Grand Vacations Tournament of Champions	65-69-67-67=268	−20	2 strokes	(United States) Nelly Korda	300,000

=== LPGA of Korea Tour wins (3) ===
- 2018 (1) OK! Savings Bank Pak Se-ri Invitational
- 2019 (1) MY Munyoung Queens Park Championship
- 2022 (1) Creas F&C KLPGA Championship

== Major championships ==
=== Wins (1) ===
Year	Championship	54 holes	Winning score	Margin	Runners-up
2020	U.S. Women's Open	5 shot deficit	−3 (68-74-72-67=281)	1 stroke	(South Korea) Ko Jin-young, (United States) Amy Olson

=== Results timeline ===
Results not in chronological order.

Tournament	2020	2021	2022	2023	2024	2025	2026
Chevron Championship		CUT	CUT	T4	T9	T40	CUT
U.S. Women's Open	1	CUT	T34	T64	T16	T26	T19
Women's PGA Championship		CUT	T50	CUT	T30	CUT	T8
Evian Championship	NT	CUT	T31	T3	CUT	CUT	T26
Women's British Open		CUT	T13	T40	CUT	T4	CUT

Win
Top 10
Did not play

CUT = missed the half-way cut
NT = no tournament
T = tied

=== Summary ===
Tournament	Wins	2nd	3rd	Top-5	Top-10	Top-25	Events	Cuts made
Chevron Championship	0	0	0	1	2	2	6	3
U.S. Women's Open	1	0	0	1	1	3	7	6
Women's PGA Championship	0	0	0	0	1	1	6	3
The Evian Championship	0	0	1	1	1	1	6	3
Women's British Open	0	0	0	1	1	2	6	3
Totals	1	0	1	4	6	9	31	18

- Most consecutive cuts made – 6 (2023 U.S. Women's Open – 2024 Women's PGA)
- Longest streak of top-10s – 1 (six times)
