= 2025 LPGA Tour =

Professional women's golf tour

2025 LPGA Tour season
- Duration: January 30, 2025 – November 23, 2025
- Number of official events: 32
- Most wins: 3 (Thailand) Jeeno Thitikul
- Race to CME Globe winner: (Thailand) Jeeno Thitikul
- Money leader: (Thailand) Jeeno Thitikul
- Vare Trophy: (Thailand) Jeeno Thitikul
- Rolex Player of the Year: (Thailand) Jeeno Thitikul
- Rookie of the Year: (Japan) Miyū Yamashita

The 2025 LPGA Tour is the 76th edition of the LPGA Tour, a series of professional golf tournaments for elite female golfers from around the world. The season began at the Hilton Grand Vacations Tournament of Champions, in Orlando, Florida on January 30, and ended on November 23, at the Tiburón Golf Club in the CME Group Tour Championship in Naples, Florida. The tournaments were sanctioned by the United States-based Ladies Professional Golf Association (LPGA).

The 2025 season saw 29 non-repeat winners, with 43 players making over $1,000,000 (both LPGA records). Jeeno Thitikul won three times on her way to winning Player of the Year and would break her own single-season earnings record she set in 2024 ($7,578,300) by winning the CME Group Tour Championship for the second consecutive year. Thitikul also won the Vare Trophy with the lowest scoring average in a single season surpassing Annika Sörenstam (2002).

== Schedule and results ==
The number in parentheses after each winners' name is the player's total number of wins in official money individual events on the LPGA Tour, including that event. Tournament and winner names in bold indicate LPGA majors. The schedule and purse amount for each tournament is listed on the LPGA website. The LPGA has a standard formula for payout percentages and distribution of its purse and prize money for every event. The winner typically gets 15% of the total, second place gets 9.3%, third place 6.75%, etc.

The final purse total for the season is $133.2 million.

Key

Major championships
Regular events

Date	Tournament	Location	Winner(s) (Note: The number in brackets after each winner's name is the number of LPGA Tour events he had won up to and including that tournament. This information is only shown for LPGA Tour members.)	WWGR points	Other tours (Note: CLPGA − China LPGA Tour, JLPGA − LPGA of Japan Tour, LET − Ladies European Tour.)	Purse (US$)	Winner's share ($)
Feb 2	Hilton Grand Vacations Tournament of Champions	Florida	(South Korea) Kim A-lim (3)	31		2,000,000	300,000
Feb 9	Founders Cup	Florida	(United States) Yealimi Noh (1)	46		2,000,000	300,000
Feb 23	Honda LPGA Thailand	Thailand	(United States) Angel Yin (2)	46		1,700,000	255,000
Mar 2	HSBC Women's World Championship	Singapore	(New Zealand) Lydia Ko (23)	53		2,400,000	360,000
Mar 9	Blue Bay LPGA	China	(Japan) Rio Takeda (2)	26	CLPGA	2,500,000	375,000
Mar 30	Ford Championship	Arizona	(South Korea) Kim Hyo-joo (7)	68		2,250,000	337,500
Apr 6	T-Mobile Match Play	Nevada	(Sweden) Madelene Sagström (2)	56		2,000,000	300,000
Apr 20	JM Eagle LA Championship	California	(Sweden) Ingrid Lindblad (1)	56		3,750,000	562,500
Apr 27	**Chevron Championship**	Texas	(Japan) **Mao Saigo** (1)	100		8,000,000	1,200,000
May 4	Black Desert Championship	Utah	(South Korea) Ryu Hae-ran (3)	50		3,000,000	450,000
May 11	Mizuho Americas Open	New Jersey	(Thailand) Jeeno Thitikul (5)	62		3,000,000	450,000
May 25	Riviera Maya Open	Mexico	(Japan) Chisato Iwai (1)	19		2,500,000	375,000
Jun 1	**U.S. Women's Open**	Wisconsin	(Sweden) **Maja Stark** (2)	100		12,000,000	2,400,000
Jun 8	ShopRite LPGA Classic	New Jersey	(United States) Jennifer Kupcho (4)	31		1,750,000	262,500
Jun 15	Meijer LPGA Classic	Michigan	(Spain) Carlota Ciganda (3)	40		3,000,000	450,000
Jun 22	**KPMG Women's PGA Championship**	Texas	(Australia) **Minjee Lee** (11)	100		12,000,000	1,800,000
Jun 29	Dow Championship	Michigan	(South Korea) Im Jin-hee (1) and (South Korea) Lee So-mi (1)	n/a		3,300,000	399,510 (each)
Jul 13	**Amundi Evian Championship**	France	(Australia) **Grace Kim** (2)	100	LET	8,000,000	1,200,000
Jul 27	ISPS Handa Women's Scottish Open	Scotland	(England) Lottie Woad (1)	46	LET	2,000,000	300,000
Aug 3	**AIG Women's Open**	Wales	(Japan) **Miyū Yamashita** (1)	100	LET	9,750,000	1,426,500
Aug 17	The Standard Portland Classic	Oregon	(Japan) Akie Iwai (1)	24		2,000,000	300,000
Aug 24	CPKC Women's Open	Canada	(Canada) Brooke Henderson (14)	62		2,750,000	412,500
Aug 31	FM Championship	Massachusetts	(China) Wang Xinying (1)	62		4,100,000	615,000
Sep 14	Kroger Queen City Championship	Ohio	(England) Charley Hull (3)	62		2,000,000	300,000
Sep 21	Walmart NW Arkansas Championship (Note: Reduced to 18 holes due to heavy rainfall causing the course to be unplayable. Win and money unofficial.)	Arkansas	(Japan) Minami Katsu (n/a) (United States) Sarah Schmelzel (n/a) (tie)	n/a		2,000,000	300,000
Oct 4	Lotte Championship	Hawaii	(South Korea) Hwang You-min (1)	31		3,000,000	450,000
Oct 12	Buick LPGA Shanghai	China	(Thailand) Jeeno Thitikul (6)	31	CLPGA	2,200,000	330,000
Oct 19	BMW Ladies Championship	South Korea	(South Korea) Kim Sei-young (13)	43		2,300,000	360,000
Nov 2	Maybank Championship	Malaysia	(Japan) Miyū Yamashita (2)	43		3,000,000	450,000
Nov 9	Toto Japan Classic	Japan	(Japan) Nasa Hataoka (7)	24	JLPGA	2,100,000	315,000
Nov 16	The Annika	Florida	(Sweden) Linn Grant (2)	46		3,250,000	487,500
Nov 23	CME Group Tour Championship	Florida	(Thailand) Jeeno Thitikul (7)	62		11,000,000	4,000,000

=== Unofficial events ===
The following events appear on the schedule, but do not carry official money.

Date	Tournament	Location	Winner	WWGR points	Purse (US$)	Winner's share ($)
Oct 26	International Crown	South Korea	Australia	n/a	2,000,000	300,000
Dec 14	Grant Thornton Invitational	Florida	(United States) Lauren Coughlin / (United States) Andrew Novak	n/a	4,000,000	500,000

== See also ==
- 2025 Ladies European Tour
- 2025 Epson Tour
