= Nataliya Guseva =

Russian professional golfer (born 2003)

Personal information
- Nickname: The Goose
- Nationality: Russia
- Born: 6 March 2003 (age 23) Moscow, Russia

Career
- Sport: Golf
- College: University of Miami
- Turned professional: 2022
- Current tours: LPGA Tour (joined 2024); Ladies European Tour (joined 2024)
- Former tour: Epson Tour (joined 2023)
- Professional wins: 1

Number of wins by tour
- Epson Tour: 1

Best results in LPGA major championships
- Chevron Championship: CUT: 2025, 2026
- Women's PGA C'ship: T24: 2026
- U.S. Women's Open: T36: 2025
- Women's British Open: CUT: 2025, 2026
- Evian Championship: T26: 2026

Achievements and awards
- ACC Freshman of the Year: 2021

Nataliya Guseva (Russian: Наталия Гусева, born 6 March 2003) is a Russian professional golfer who plays on the LPGA Tour and Ladies European Tour (LET).

== Amateur career ==
Guseva had a successful amateur career and won international tournaments across Europe. In 2019, she won the Junior Vagliano Trophy with the European team, and was runner-up at the French International Ladies Amateur Championship, four strokes behind Virginia Elena Carta.

She enrolled at the University of Miami in January 2021 and started playing with the Miami Hurricanes women's golf team. Four months later, she was named ACC Freshman of the Year.

== Professional career ==
Guseva joined the 2023 Epson Tour, and won her maiden professional title at the Black Desert Resort Championship in her rookie year.

She became the first player from Russia to earn a card for the LPGA Tour when she secured one for 2024 at qualifying school, where she tied for 23rd. Two weeks later, she was the medalist at LET Q-School in Morocco by four shots, to also earn a Ladies European Tour card.

In her rookie LPGA Tour season, she was runner-up at the Portland Classic and Lotte Championship to finish 26th in the season rankings. She also tied for third at the 2024 Magical Kenya Ladies Open on the LET. She rose to 78th in the Women's World Golf Rankings by year end.

== Amateur wins ==
- 2017 Evolve Spanish Junior Championship
- 2018 Zavidovo Juniors International, Bulgarian Amateur Open Championship, Turkish International Amateur Open Championship, Evolve Spanish Junior Championship
- 2019 Austrian International Amateur, Turkish International Amateur Open Championship, Spanish International Stroke Play
- 2020 Campeonato Internacional de Andalucia Sub-18, PGA Catalunya Amateur Cup
- 2022 Women's Eastern Amateur Championship

== Professional wins (1) ==
=== Epson Tour wins (1) ===
| No. | Year | Tournament | Score | Margin of victory | Runners-up |
|---|---|---|---|---|---|
| 1 | 2023 | Black Desert Resort Championship | −18 (66-67-65=198) | 2 strokes | (United States) Jenny Coleman, (United States) Mariel Galdiano (France) Agathe Laisné, (Italy) Roberta Liti |

== Results in LPGA majors ==
| Tournament | 2024 | 2025 | 2026 |
|---|---|---|---|
| Chevron Championship | | CUT | CUT |
| U.S. Women's Open | | T36 | 67 |
| Women's PGA Championship | CUT | T75 | T24 |
| The Evian Championship | CUT | CUT | T26 |
| Women's British Open | | CUT | CUT |

Did not play

CUT = missed the half-way cut
T = tied

== Team appearances ==
Amateur

- Junior Vagliano Trophy: (representing the Continent of Europe): 2019 (winners)
- European Young Masters: (representing Russia): 2019
- European Ladies' Team Championship: (representing Russia): 2019
- European Girls' Team Championship: (representing Russia): 2020
