= Jing Yan =

Chinese-American professional golfer (born c.1996)

Personal information
- Nationality: China (until March 2026); United States (since March 2026)
- Born: c.1996 Bristol, Connecticut, U.S.

Career
- Sport: Golf
- College: University of Washington
- Turned professional: 2015
- Current tour: LPGA Tour
- Former tour: Epson Tour

Best results in LPGA major championships
- Chevron Championship: T12: 2019
- Women's PGA C'ship: T48: 2026
- U.S. Women's Open: T21: 2017
- Women's British Open: T16: 2019
- Evian Championship: T20: 2014

Jing Yan (born c. 1996) is a Chinese-American professional golfer. Yan joined the LPGA Tour in 2015 after playing one season at the University of Washington. She represented China until early 2026 when she switched to representing the United States.

== Amateur career ==
Yan was born in China and moved with her family to Singapore when she was four years old. Yan was a standout junior amateur golfer. In 2013, she won the Girls Amateur Championship at Fairhaven Golf Club and then the Ladies' British Open Amateur Stroke Play Championship at Prestwick.

Yan was recruited by Mary Lou Mulflur to play collegiate golf at the University of Washington, becoming one of the university's top recruits. Yan would only play three tournaments for Washington. In 2014, she won on her second outing at the Pat Lesser Harbottle Invitational.

== Professional career ==
In 2015, Yan turned professional at age 19, joining the Epson Tour. Later that year, Yan joined the LPGA Tour after earning her tour card when she finished 34th as an amateur at the Final Qualifying Tournament. Yan shared that her decision to turn pro so quickly after arriving at Washington was in an effort to represent team China at the 2016 Summer Olympics in Rio. Yan would play only a few tournaments in her rookie season, after beginning the season on conditional status.

In 2016, Yan represented China at the International Crown. In 2019, she played in 25 events and earned three top-10 finishes. In 2024, she finished T27 at the LPGA Q-Series, earning her card for the 2025 LPGA Tour season.

== Team appearances ==
- International Crown (representing China): 2016
