= Brooke Matthews =

American professional golfer (born 1998)

Personal information
- Nationality: United States
- Born: November 9, 1998 (age 27) Rogers, Arkansas, U.S.
- Height: 5 ft 7 in (170 cm)

Career
- Sport: Golf
- College: University of Arkansas
- Turned professional: 2021
- Current tour: LPGA Tour (joined 2022)
- Former tour: Epson Tour (joined 2023)

Best results in LPGA major championships
- Chevron Championship: T28: 2025
- Women's PGA C'ship: T61: 2025
- U.S. Women's Open: CUT: 2023
- Women's British Open: T46: 2025
- Evian Championship: CUT: 2021, 2025, 2026

Brooke Matthews (born November 9, 1998) is an American professional golfer and LPGA Tour player.

== Amateur career ==
Matthews attended the University of Arkansas, where she set an NCAA record for lowest 54-hole record of 25-under at the 2021 Cougar Classic, better than the previous record by six strokes.

In 2021, Matthews represented the United States at the Arnold Palmer Cup and Curtis Cup, where she defeated 2023 Smyth Salver winner Charlotte Heath, 3 and 2, in the singles.

== Professional career ==
Matthews turned professional at the end of 2021 and joined the 2022 LPGA Tour, after she earned membership at Q-Series by finishing tied 30th. In her rookie season, she recorded a season-best tied 10th at the Dow Great Lakes Bay Invitational, and dropped down to the Epson Tour for 2023. In 2024, she recorded seven top-10 finishes, including a season-best runner-up finish at the FireKeepers Casino Hotel Championship, to finish 5th in the Epson Tour rankings to graduate to the LPGA Tour for 2025.

In 2025, Matthews made a hole-in-one at the penultimate event of the season, The Annika, to secure a place amongst the top-60 of the season.

== Amateur wins ==
- 2016 Otter Creek Junior Championship, Arkansas Junior Match Play Championship
- 2017 AJGA Junior at The Legends
- 2020 The Blessings Intercollegiate
- 2021 Cougar Classic, The Blessings Intercollegiate

== Results in LPGA majors ==
Tournament	2021	2022	2023	2024	2025	2026
Chevron Championship					T28	CUT
U.S. Women's Open			CUT			
Women's PGA Championship					T61	CUT
The Evian Championship	CUT				CUT	CUT
Women's British Open					T46	

Did not play

CUT = missed the half-way cut
T = tied

== Team appearances ==
Amateur

- Curtis Cup (representing the United States): 2021 (winners)
- Arnold Palmer Cup (representing the United States): 2021 (winners)
