= Amanda Doherty =

American professional golfer (born 1993)

Personal information
- Nationality: United States
- Born: September 16, 1997 (age 29) Atlanta, Georgia, U.S.
- Height: 5 ft 1 in (155 cm)

Career
- Sport: Golf
- College: Florida State University
- Turned professional: 2020
- Current tour: LPGA Tour
- Former tour: Epson Tour

Best results in LPGA major championships
- Chevron Championship: 22nd: 2023
- Women's PGA C'ship: CUT: 2022, 2023, 2026
- U.S. Women's Open: T40: 2022
- Women's British Open: 64th: 2026
- Evian Championship: T37: 2022

Achievements and awards
- Gaëlle Truet Rookie of the Year Award: 2021

Amanda Doherty (born September 16, 1997) is an American professional golfer who plays on the LPGA Tour.

== Amateur career ==
She started playing golf at 13.

== Professional career ==
She turned professional in 2020, playing on the Symetra Tour through 2021. She played in nine events, making the cut in seven of them. She tied for fifth at the IOA Golf Classic on September 27. In 2021, she played in 19 events, making 15 cuts, including eight top-10 finishes. She placed runner-up at the IOA Golf Classic on May 23.

She carried a one-stroke lead after 54 holes (three rounds) with a 12-under-par on August 11, in the ISPS Handa World Invitational, in Ballymena, Northern Ireland, over Peiyun Chien and Georgia Hall. She finished tied for eighth, with a final score of 280 (−11), her highest place in a tournament.

== Personal life ==
She graduated from The Galloway School, a private school in Atlanta, Georgia, in 2016, before attending Florida State University where she played her collegiate golf with the Florida State Seminoles women's golf team. She graduated in 2020, with a degree in Sport management. When not playing golf, she likes to play the guitar and draw.

== Results in LPGA majors ==
Results not in chronological order.

Tournament	2022	2023	2024	2025	2026
Chevron Championship		22			
U.S. Women's Open	T40	CUT		CUT	
Women's PGA Championship	CUT	CUT			CUT
The Evian Championship	T37	CUT			CUT
Women's British Open					64

Did not play

CUT = missed the half-way cut
T = tied

=== Summary ===
Tournament	Wins	2nd	3rd	Top-5	Top-10	Top-25	Events	Cuts made
Chevron Championship	0	0	0	0	0	1	1	1
U.S. Women's Open	0	0	0	0	0	0	3	1
Women's PGA Championship	0	0	0	0	0	0	3	0
The Evian Championship	0	0	0	0	0	0	3	1
Women's British Open	0	0	0	0	0	0	1	1
Totals	0	0	0	0	0	1	11	4

== LPGA Tour career summary ==
Year	Tournaments played	Cuts made*	Wins	2nd	3rd	Top 10s	Best finish	Earnings ($)	Money list rank	Scoring average	Scoring rank
2022	20	12	0	0	0	1	T8	219,674	90	71.47	76
2023	22	9	0	0	0	0	T15	180,633	102	72.81	138
2024	8	5	0	0	0	1	T8	99,725	133	70.81	n/a
2025	14	7	0	0	0	0	T23	86,853	136	72.08	104
Totals^	64	33	0	0	0	2	T8	586,885	437		

^ Official as of 2025 season
* Includes matchplay and other tournaments without a cut.

== World ranking ==
Position in Women's World Golf Rankings at the end of each calendar year.

Year	Ranking	Source
2020	1,029	
2021	377	
2022	213	
2023	233	
2024	302	
2025	376	
