= Ina Yoon =

South Korean professional golfer (born 2003)

Personal information
- Nationality: South Korea
- Born: 2 May 2003 (age 23)
- Height: 5 ft 7 in (170 cm)

Career
- Sport: Golf
- Turned professional: 2021
- Current tour: LPGA Tour
- Former tours: LPGA of Korea Tour; KLPGA Dream Tour
- Professional wins: 2

Number of wins by tour
- LPGA of Korea Tour: 2
- Other: 1

Best results in LPGA major championships
- Chevron Championship: T4: 2026
- Women's PGA C'ship: 2nd: 2026
- U.S. Women's Open: T14: 2025
- Women's British Open: CUT: 2025, 2026
- Evian Championship: T53: 2026

Achievements and awards
- LPGA of Korea Tour leading money winner: 2024

Korean name
- Hangul: 윤이나
- RR: Yun Ina
- MR: Yun Ina

Ina Yoon (Korean: 윤이나; born 2 May 2003) is a South Korean golfer. Yoon turned professional at age 19 and joined the LPGA tour in 2025. In 2025, Yoon reached a career high ranking of 24th in the world.

== Biography ==
Yoon is from South Korea. Yoon graduated from Jinju Foreign Language High School (ko:진주외국어고등학교) in Jinju, South Gyeongsang. In 2021, at age 19, she became a professional golfer, playing on the LPGA of Korea Tour's Dream Tour. In 2022, she won the EverCollagen Queens Crown during her rookie season on the LPGA of Korea Tour.

=== Suspension ===
During the 2022 Korea Women's Open, Yoon played the wrong golf ball on the 15th hole of the first round of the tournament. She received a three year suspension from the Korea Golf Association as a result. While suspended, Yoon moved to Tampa, Florida where she worked to develop her game playing on the Minor League Golf Tour. She donated her winnings from the tour to local junior golf programs. The Korea Golf Association later reduced Yoon's suspension to 18 months and she returned to professional competition.

=== Return from suspension ===
After returning to the LPGA of Korea Tour in 2024, Yoon won the JejuSamdasoo Masters. In 2024, she was the top ranked player on the LPGA of Korea Tour, winning the most prize money and recording the lowest average strokes on the tour. Yoon finished the season with 14 top-10 finishes and earned 1.2 billion won in prize money ($860,000).

=== LPGA Tour debut ===
After finishing as the top Korean finisher in the LPGA Qualifying Series, Yoon made her debut on the LPGA Tour at the 2025 Founders Cup at age 21. Later that month, Yoon tied for fourth at the Saudi Ladies International while playing on the Ladies European Tour. Prior to the 2025 U.S. Women's Open, Yoon was ranked 24th in the world.

== Amateur wins ==
- 2018 New South Wales Women's Amateur Championship
- 2019 Korean Women's Amateur - KangMinKoo Cup
- 2021 FCG Western States Players Cup

== Professional wins (3) ==
=== LPGA of Korea Tour wins (2) ===
- 2022 EverCollagen Queens Crown
- 2024 Jeju Samdasoo Masters

=== KLPGA Dream Tour wins (1) ===
- 2021 Torbist-Phoenix CC Dream Tour

== Results in LPGA majors ==
Tournament	2025	2026
Chevron Championship	T52	T4
U.S. Women's Open	T14	CUT
Women's PGA Championship	CUT	2
The Evian Championship	T65	T53
Women's British Open	CUT	CUT

Top 10
Did not play

CUT = missed the half-way cut
T = tied

== Team appearances ==
- World Junior Girls Golf Championship (representing South Korea): 2019 (winners)
- Spirit International Amateur Golf Championship (representing South Korea): 2019
