= 2019 U.S. Women's Open =

Tournament information
- Dates: May 30 – June 2, 2019
- Location: Charleston, South Carolina; 32.765°N 79.964°W
- Course: Country Club of Charleston
- Organized by: USGA
- Tour: LPGA Tour

Statistics
- Field: 156 players, 70 after cut
- Cut: 145 (+3)
- Prize fund: $5.5 million
- Winner's share: $1,000,000

Champion
- (South Korea) Lee Jeong-eun
- 278 (−6)
- Location in the United States Location in South Carolina

The 2019 U.S. Women's Open was the 74th U.S. Women's Open, played May 30 – June 2 at Country Club of Charleston in Charleston, South Carolina.

The U.S. Women's Open is the oldest of the five current major championships and the second of the 2019 season. It has the largest purse in women's golf at $5.5 million. The tournament was televised by Fox Sports 1 and Fox Sports.

== Qualifying and field ==
The championship is open to any female professional or amateur golfer with a USGA handicap index not exceeding 2.4. Players qualify by competing in one of 24 36-hole qualifying tournaments held at sites across the United States and at international sites in China, England, Japan, and South Korea. Additional players are exempt from qualifying because of past performances in professional or amateur tournaments around the world.

=== Exempt from qualifying ===
Many players were exempt in multiple categories. Players are listed only once, in the first category in which they became exempt, with additional categories in parentheses () next to their names. Golfers qualifying in Category 15 who qualified in other categories are denoted with the tour by which they qualified.

1. Winners of the U.S. Women's Open for the last ten years (2009–2018)

Choi Na-yeon, Chun In-gee (10,12,14,17,18), Paula Creamer, Ji Eun-hee (12,13,14,17,18), Ariya Jutanugarn (8,11,12,14,17,18), Brittany Lang, Park Sung-hyun (7,12,13,14,17,18), Inbee Park (7,8,11,12,17,18), Ryu So-yeon (9,12,14,17,18)

- Michelle Wie (11,12,17,18) will not play due to wrist injury.

2. Winners from the 2018 and 2019 U.S. Senior Women's Open

Laura Davies

- Helen Alfredsson did not play.

3. Winner and runner-up from the 2018 U.S. Women's Amateur; winner of the 2018 U.S. Girls' Junior and U.S. Women's Mid-Amateur (must be an amateur)

Jeon Ji-won (a), Shannon Johnson (a)

Kristen Gillman and Yealimi Noh forfeited their exemptions by turning professional.

4. Winner of the 2018 British Ladies Amateur (must be an amateur)

Leonie Harm (a)

5. Winner of the 2018 Mark H. McCormack Medal (Women's World Amateur Golf Ranking) (must be an amateur)

Jennifer Kupcho (6) forfeited her exemption by turning professional before the start of the tournament. She chose to forfeit after qualifying for the tournament via regional qualifying on April 29.

6. Winner of the 2019 Augusta National Women's Amateur (must be an amateur)

See above.

7. Winners of the Women's PGA Championship for the last five years (2015–2018)

Brooke Henderson (12,14,17,18), Danielle Kang (11,12,14,17,18)

8. Winners of the Ricoh Women's British Open for the last five years (2014–2018)

Georgia Hall (12,14,15–LET,17,18)

- In-Kyung Kim (12,17,18) and Mo Martin (12) did not play.

9. Winners of the ANA Inspiration for the last five years (2015–2019)

Ko Jin-young (12,13,14,17,18), Lydia Ko (10,12,17,18), Pernilla Lindberg (12,17)

- Brittany Lincicome (12,17,18) did not play – deferred exemption for maternity leave.

10. Winners of the Evian Championship for the last five years (2014–2018)

Kim Hyo-joo (11,12,17,18), Anna Nordqvist (12,17,18), Angela Stanford (11,12,14,17,18)

11. Ten lowest scorers and anyone tying for 10th place from the 2018 U.S. Women's Open

Carlota Ciganda (12,13,17,18), Nasa Hataoka (12,13,14,17,18), Wei-Ling Hsu (12), Charley Hull (12,17,18), Megan Khang (12), Kim Ji-hyun, Nelly Korda (12,13,14,17,18), Patty Tavatanakit, Lexi Thompson (12,14,17,18)

- Sarah Jane Smith (12) did not play – deferred exemption for maternity leave.

12. Top 75 money leaders from the 2018 final official LPGA money list

Marina Alex (14,17,18), Brittany Altomare (17), Aditi Ashok, Céline Boutier (14), Ashleigh Buhai, Pei-Yun Chien, Chella Choi, Jacqui Concolino, Lindy Duncan, Austin Ernst (17,18), Jodi Ewart Shadoff (17), Shanshan Feng (17,18), Sandra Gal, Hannah Green, Jaye Marie Green, Moriya Jutanugarn (17,18), Haeji Kang, Cristie Kerr (17,18), Kim Sei-young (14,17,18), Katherine Kirk, Jessica Korda (17,18), Bronte Law (14,18), Lee Jeong-eun, Lee Mi-hyang (13,17,18), Mirim Lee, Minjee Lee (13,14,17,18), Yu Liu (17,18), Gaby López (14,18), Caroline Masson (17,18), Ally McDonald, Azahara Muñoz (13,17,18), Su-Hyun Oh, Amy Olson (17,18), Ryann O'Toole, Annie Park (14,18), Jane Park, Pornanong Phatlum, Lizette Salas (17,18), Jenny Shin (17,18), Jennifer Song, Mariah Stackhouse, Thidapa Suwannapura (14), Emma Talley, Pannarat Thanapolboonyaras, Ayako Uehara, Amy Yang (13,14,17,18), Angel Yin (17,18), Sakura Yokomine

13. Top 10 money leaders from the 2019 official LPGA money list, through the close of entries on April 17

Already qualified

14. Winners of LPGA co-sponsored events, whose victories are considered official, from the conclusion of the 2018 U.S. Women's Open to the initiation of the 2019 U.S. Women's Open

Already qualified

15. Top five money leaders from the 2018 Japan LPGA Tour, Korea LPGA Tour and Ladies European Tour

Jenny Haglund (LET), Caroline Hedwall (LET), Mamiko Higa (JLPGA,17,18), Sarah Kemp (LET), Lee Jeong-eun (KLPGA,17,18), Misuzu Narita (JLPGA), Jiyai Shin (JLPGA,17,18), Ai Suzuki (JLPGA,17,18), Anne Van Dam (LET)

- Ahn Sun-ju (JLPGA,17,18), Bae Seon-woo (KLPGA,17,18), Choi Hye-jin (KLPGA,17,18), Lee So-young (KLPGA), and Oh Ji-hyun (KLPGA,17) did not play.

16. Top three money leaders from the 2018 China LPGA Tour

Saranporn Langkulgasettrin, Liu Yan, Supamas Sangchan

17. Top 50 point leaders from the current Rolex Rankings and anyone tying for 50th place as of April 17

Already qualified

18. Top 50 point leaders from the current Rolex Rankings and anyone tying for 50th place as of May 27

Minami Katsu

19. Special exemptions selected by the USGA

Stacy Lewis, Gerina Piller (maternity extension), Karrie Webb

=== Qualifiers ===
Additional players qualified through sectional qualifying tournaments which took place April 22 to May 13 at sites in the United States, China, South Korea, England, and Japan.

Apr 22 at Ohtone Country Club, Ibaraki Prefecture, Japan

Haruka Amamoto
Hina Arakaki
Eri Okayama
Nanako Ueno (a)
Yuri Yoshida (a)
Hina Arakaki

Apr 23 at Forsgate Country Club (Banks Course), Monroe Township, New Jersey

Emma Albrecht
Megha Ganne (a)

Apr 24 at Industry Hills Golf Club (Ike Course), City of Industry, California

Andrea Lee (a)
Suzuka Yamaguchi
Rose Zhang (a)

Apr 25 at Dream Park Country Club, Incheon, South Korea

Jiyu Jung
Dasom Ma (a)

Apr 25 at OGA Golf Course, Woodburn, Oregon

Auston Kim (a)
Naomi Ko

Apr 29 at Contra Costa Country Club, Pleasant Hill, California

Ty Akabane (a)
Sabrina Iqbal (a)
Albane Valenzuela (a)

Apr 29 at Rancho Santa Fe Golf Club, Rancho Santa Fe, California

Jennifer Chang (a)
Gabriela Ruffels (a)

Apr 29 at Country Club of Ocala, Ocala, Florida

María Fassi
Sierra Brooks (a)

Apr 29 at Starmount Forest Country Club, Greensboro, North Carolina

Gina Kim (a)
Jennifer Kupcho
Heather Bowie Young

Apr 30 at Springfield Golf & Country Club, Springfield, Virginia

Amanda Hollandsworth
Karoline Stormo (a)

May 2 at Canyon Creek Country Club, Richardson, Texas

Brigitte Dunne (a)
Kaitlyn Papp (a)
Amy Ruengmateekhun

May 5 at Hong Kong Golf Club, Hong Kong, China

Babe Liu
Prima Thammaraks

May 6 at Pinnacle Peak Country Club, Scottsdale, Arizona

Kang Ji-min
Stephanie Meadow
Sarah Schmelzel

May 6 at Marin Country Club, Novato, California

Nanna Koerstz Madsen
Morgan Pressel
Charlotte Thomas

May 6 at Walnut Creek Golf Preserve, Westminster, Colorado

Dottie Ardina
Ólafía Þórunn Kristinsdóttir

May 6 at Bradenton Country Club, Bradenton, Florida

Megan Osland
Ingrid Gutierrez Nunez

May 6 at The Wanderers Club, Wellington, Florida

Delfina Acosta
Alexa Pano (a)

May 6 at Druid Hills Golf Club, Atlanta, Georgia

Fátima Fernández Cano
Yuka Saso (a)
Leona Maguire

May 6 at Oahu Country Club, Honolulu, Hawaii

Tiffany Chan

May 6 at Elgin Country Club, Elgin, Illinois

Wichanee Meechai
Megan Furtney (a)

May 6 at TPC Boston, Norton, Massachusetts

Celeste Dao (a)

May 6 at Chartiers Country Club, Pittsburgh, Pennsylvania

Paris Hilinski (a)
Rachel Rohanna

May 7 at Buckinghamshire Golf Club, Buckinghamshire, England

Lucrezia Colombotto Rosso
Hayley Davis
Esther Henseleit

May 7 at Rush Creek Golf Club, Maple Grove, Minnesota

Karine Icher
Reagan Zibilski

May 13 at The Clubs at Houston Oaks, Hockley, Texas
originally May 8 at The Clubs of Kingwood (Island Course), Kingwood, Texas

Maria Torres
Dori Carter
Marissa Steen
Jing Yan

(a) denotes amateur

== Round summaries ==
=== First round ===
Thursday, May 30, 2019

Mamiko Higa, playing in her first U.S. Women's Open, shot a 6-under-par 65 to take a one stroke lead over Esther Henseleit and amateur Gina Kim. Defending champion Ariya Jutanugarn and world number 1 Ko Jin-young were seven strokes back after rounds of 72.

Place	Player	Score	To par
1	(Japan) Mamiko Higa	65	−6
T2	(Germany) Esther Henseleit	66	−5
T2	(United States) Gina Kim (a)	66	−5
4	(France) Céline Boutier	67	−4
T5	(South Korea) Kim Sei-young	68	−3
T5	(Spain) Azahara Muñoz	68	−3
T7	(Spain) Carlota Ciganda	69	−2
T7	(United States) Jessica Korda	69	−2
T7	(United States) Nelly Korda	69	−2
T7	(United States) Andrea Lee (a)	69	−2
T7	(China) Yu Liu	69	−2
T7	(Japan) Misuzu Narita	69	−2
T7	(South Korea) Jenny Shin	69	−2

=== Second round ===
Friday, May 31, 2019
Saturday, June 1, 2019

A two-hour weather delay meant that the second round could not be completed on Friday. 45 players completed their second rounds on Saturday morning. Mamiko Higa shot an even-par 71 to maintain a one-stroke lead over Céline Boutier and Jessica Korda.

Place	Player	Score	To par
1	(Japan) Mamiko Higa	65-71=136	−6
T2	(France) Céline Boutier	67-70=137	−5
T2	(United States) Jessica Korda	69-68=137	−5
4	(United States) Gina Kim (a)	66-72=138	−4
T5	(United States) Jaye Marie Green	71-68=139	−3
T5	(South Korea) Kim Sei-young	68-71=139	−3
T5	(South Korea) Lee Jeong-eun	70-69=139	−3
T5	(South Korea) Ryu So-yeon	71-68=139	−3
T5	(United States) Lexi Thompson	70-69=139	−3
T10	(United States) Nelly Korda	69-71=140	−2
T10	(China) Yu Liu	69-71=140	−2
T10	(Australia) Minjee Lee	71-69=140	−2
T10	(Spain) Azahara Muñoz	68-72=140	−2
T10	(South Korea) Inbee Park	70-70=140	−2
T10	(South Korea) Park Sung-hyun	71-69=140	−2
T10	(United States) Gerina Piller	70-70=140	−2
T10	(United States) Angel Yin	72-68=140	−2

=== Third round ===
Saturday, June 1, 2019

Céline Boutier and Yu Liu, former teammates at Duke University, shared the lead after the third round. They were one stroke ahead of first and second round leader Mamiko Higa, Jaye Marie Green, and Lexi Thompson.

Place	Player	Score	To par
T1	(France) Céline Boutier	67-70-69=206	−7
T1	(China) Yu Liu	69-71-66=206	−7
T3	(United States) Jaye Marie Green	71-68-68=207	−6
T3	(Japan) Mamiko Higa	65-71-71=207	−6
T3	(United States) Lexi Thompson	70-69-68=207	−6
6	(South Korea) Lee Jeong-eun	70-69-69=208	−5
T7	(United States) Jessica Korda	69-68-72=209	−4
T7	(Mexico) Gaby López	72-70-67=209	−4
T9	(Australia) Minjee Lee	71-69-70=210	−3
T9	(Denmark) Nanna Koerstz Madsen	73-71-66=210	−3
T9	(South Korea) Ryu So-yeon	71-68-71=210	−3

=== Final round ===
Sunday, June 2, 2019

Place	Player	Score	To par	Money ($)
1	(South Korea) Lee Jeong-eun	70-69-69-70=278	−6	1,000,000
T2	(South Korea) Ryu So-yeon	71-68-71-70=280	−4	412,168
T2	(United States) Lexi Thompson	70-69-68-73=280	−4	412,168
T2	(United States) Angel Yin	72-68-72-68=280	−4	412,168
T5	(France) Céline Boutier	67-70-69-75=281	−3	178,633
T5	(United States) Jaye Marie Green	71-68-68-74=281	−3	178,633
T5	(Japan) Mamiko Higa	65-71-71-74=281	−3	178,633
T5	(China) Yu Liu	69-71-66-75=281	−3	178,633
T5	(United States) Gerina Piller	70-70-73-68=281	−3	178,633
T10	(United States) Jessica Korda	69-68-72-73=282	−2	125,518
T10	(United States) Ally McDonald	72-72-67-71=282	−2	125,518

==== Scorecard ====
Hole	1	2	3	4	5	6	7	8	9	10	11	12	13	14	15	16	17	18
Par	4	4	3	4	5	3	4	4	5	4	3	4	4	4	5	4	3	4
(South Korea) Lee	−4	−5	−5	−5	−5	−5	−5	−5	−5	−5	−6	−7	−7	−7	−8	−7	−7	−6
(South Korea) Ryu	−1	−1	−2	−2	−3	−3	−3	−2	−2	−2	−2	−3	−3	−3	−4	−4	−4	−4
(United States) Thompson	−5	−5	−4	−3	−3	−3	−4	−4	−5	−5	−4	−4	−3	−3	−3	−3	−3	−4
(United States) Yin	−1	−1	−1	−1	−2	−2	−2	−2	−3	−3	−3	−3	−3	−3	−4	−5	−5	−4
(France) Boutier	−5	−5	−4	−4	−5	−6	−6	−6	−6	−6	−5	−5	−5	−5	−5	−5	−5	−3
(United States) Green	−6	−6	−5	−5	−6	−6	−5	−5	−6	−6	−6	−5	−5	−4	−4	−3	−3	−3
(Japan) Higa	−6	−6	−5	−5	−5	−4	−4	−3	−3	−2	−2	−2	−1	−2	−2	−3	−3	−3
(China) Liu	−6	−5	−5	−4	−5	−4	−4	−4	−5	−5	−5	−5	−5	−4	−4	−4	−3	−3
(United States) Piller	E	E	−1	−1	−2	−2	−2	−2	−3	−4	−5	−5	−4	−3	−3	−3	−3	−3

Cumulative tournament scores, relative to par

Birdie	Bogey	Double bogey

== Final round ratings ==
728 thousand on Fox, in the USA
