= 2017 LPGA of Korea Tour =

The 2017 LPGA of Korea Tour is the 40th season of the LPGA of Korea Tour, the professional golf tour for women operated by the Korea Ladies Professional Golf Association. It consists of 33 golf tournaments, 29 played in South Korea, three in China, and one in Japan. Hanwha Finance Classic became one of the tour's major tournaments starting from this season, which makes the tour have 5 major tournaments.

== Schedule ==
The number in parentheses after winners' names show the player's total number wins in official money individual events on the LPGA of Korea Tour, including that event.

Dates	Tournament	Host city	Prize fund (KRW)	Winner	Notes
Dec 16–18	Hyundai China Ladies Open	(China) Qingyuan	US$550,000	(South Korea) Kim Hyo-joo (10)	Co-sanctioned by China LPGA Tour
Mar 17–19	SGF67 World Ladies Championship	(China) Haikou	700,000,000	(South Korea) Kim Hae-rym (3)	Co-sanctioned by China LPGA Tour and Ladies European Tour
Apr 6–9	Lotte Rent-a-Car Women's Open	(South Korea) Seogwipo	600,000,000	(South Korea) Lee Jeong-eun (1)	
Apr 14–16	Samchully Together Open	(South Korea) Yongin	900,000,000	(South Korea) Park Min-ji (1)	
Apr 21–23	Nexen-Saintnine Masters	(South Korea) Gimhae	500,000,000	(South Korea) Kim Min-sun (4)	
Apr 28–30	KG-Edaily Ladies Open	(South Korea) Yongin	500,000,000	(South Korea) Kim Ji-hyun1 (1)	
May 5–7	KyoChon Honey Ladies Open	(South Korea) Chungju	500,000,000	(South Korea) Kim Hae-rym (4)	
May 12–14	NH Investment & Securities Ladies Championship	(South Korea) Yongin	700,000,000	(South Korea) Kim Ji-yeong (1)	
May 17–21	Doosan Match Play Championship	(South Korea) Chuncheon	700,000,000	(South Korea) Kim Char-young (4)	
May 26–28	E1 Charity Open	(South Korea) Icheon	600,000,000	(South Korea) Lee Ji-hyun (1)	
Jun 2–4	Lotte Cantata Ladies Open	(South Korea) Seogwipo	600,000,000	(South Korea) Kim Ji-hyun2 (3)	
Jun 9–11	S-Oil Championship	(South Korea) Jeju	700,000,000	(South Korea) Kim Ji-hyun1 (2)	
Jun 15–18	**Kia Motors Korea Women's Open Championship**	(South Korea) Incheon	1,000,000,000	(South Korea) Kim Ji-hyun1 (3)	
Jun 22–25	BC Card-Hankyung Ladies Cup	(South Korea) Icheon	700,000,000	(South Korea) Oh Ji-hyun (3)	
Jun 30 – Jul 2	ChoJung Sparkling Water Yongpyong Resort Open	(South Korea) Pyeongchang	500,000,000	(South Korea) Choi Hye-jin (1,a)	
Jul 7–9	Kumho Tire Ladies Open	(China) Weihai	500,000,000	(South Korea) Park Bo-mi (1)	Co-sanctioned by China LPGA Tour
Jul 14–16	Caido Women's Open	(South Korea) Chilgok	500,000,000	(South Korea) Park Shin-young (1)	
Jul 21–23	MY Munyoung Queens Park Championship	(South Korea) Paju	500,000,000	(South Korea) Lee Jeong-eun (2)	
Aug 11–13	Jeju Samdasoo Masters	(South Korea) Jeju	600,000,000	(South Korea) Ko Jin-young (8)	
Aug 18–20	Bogner-MBN Ladies Open	(South Korea) Yangpyeong	500,000,000	(South Korea) Choi Hye-jin (2,a)	
Aug 24–27	High1 Resort Ladies Open	(South Korea) Jeongseon	800,000,000	(South Korea) Lee Jeong-eun (3)	
Aug 31 – Sep 3	**Hanwha Classic**	(South Korea) Chuncheon	1,400,000,000	(South Korea) Oh Ji-hyun (4)	
Sep 7–10	**ISU Group KLPGA Championship**	(South Korea) Gapyeong	800,000,000	(South Korea) Jang Su-yeon (3)	
Sep 14–17	BMW Ladies Championship	(South Korea) Incheon	1,200,000,000	(South Korea) Ko Jin-young (9)	
Sep 22–24	OK! Savings Bank Pak Se-ri Invitational	(South Korea) Yangju	700,000,000	(South Korea) Lee Jeong-eun (4)	
Sep 28–30	Fantom Classic with YTN	(South Korea) Yongin	600,000,000	(South Korea) Lee Da-yeon (1)	
Oct 12–15	LPGA KEB Hana Bank Championship	(South Korea) Incheon	US$2,000,000	(South Korea) Ko Jin-young (10)	Co-sanctioned by LPGA Tour
Oct 19–22	**KB Financial Star Championship**	(South Korea) Icheon	800,000,000	(South Korea) Kim Hae-rym (5)	
Oct 27–29	SK Pinx-Seoul Economic Ladies Classic	(South Korea) Seogwipo	600,000,000	(South Korea) Kim Hye-seon (1)	Shortened to 36 holes due to weather
Nov 2–5	**Hite Jinro Championship**	(South Korea) Yeoju	800,000,000	(South Korea) Lee Seung-hyun (6)	
Nov 10–12	ADT CAPS Championship	(South Korea) Icheon	500,000,000	(South Korea) Ji Han-sol (1)	
Nov 18–19	LF Point Final Championship	(South Korea) Jangheung	170,000,000	(South Korea) Choi Hye-jin (n/a)	Unofficial tournament
Nov 24–26	ING Life Champions Trophy	(South Korea) Gyeongju	1,000,000,000	KLPGA Tour	Team match play, KLPGA vs LPGA Tour Korean players
Dec 1–3	The Queens	(Japan) Aichi	¥100,000,000	LPGA of Japan	

Events in bold are majors.
