= 2018 Women's PGA Championship =

Tournament information
- Dates: June 28 – July 1, 2018
- Location: Long Grove, Illinois; 42.2093°N 88.0381°W
- Course: Kemper Lakes Golf Club
- Organized by: PGA of America
- Tour: LPGA Tour
- Format: Stroke play - 72 holes

Statistics
- Par: 72
- Length: 6,741 yards (6,164 m)
- Field: 156 players, 73 after cut
- Cut: 147 (+3)
- Prize fund: $3.65 million
- Winner's share: $547,500

Champion
- (South Korea) Park Sung-hyun
- 278 (−10), playoff
- Location in the United States Location in Illinois

The 2018 KPMG Women's PGA Championship was the 64th Women's PGA Championship, played June 28 – July 1 at Kemper Lakes Golf Club in Long Grove, Illinois. Known as the LPGA Championship through 2014, it was the third of five major championships on the LPGA Tour during the 2018 season.

Park Sung-hyun won the championship in a playoff over Nasa Hataoka and Ryu So-yeon. It was Park's second major win.

== Field ==
The field included 156 players who met one or more of the selection criteria and commit to participate by a designated deadline.

=== Qualified players ===
Players who qualified for the Championship are listed below. Players are listed under the first category in which they qualified; additional qualifying categories are shown in parentheses.

1. Active LPGA Hall of Fame members

Karrie Webb (2,11)

2. Past winners of the Women's PGA Championship

Laura Davies (11), Shanshan Feng (4,6,11), Brooke Henderson (3,4,5,6,11), Juli Inkster, Danielle Kang (3,4,5,6,9,11), Cristie Kerr (4,6,9,11), Anna Nordqvist (3,4,6,9,11), Inbee Park (3,4,5,61,11), Yani Tseng (11)

- Suzann Pettersen (3) did not play.

3. Professionals who have won an LPGA major championship in the previous five years and during the current year

Chun In-gee (4,6,11), Ariya Jutanugarn (4,6,11), Kim Hyo-joo (4,11), In-Kyung Kim (4,6,11), Lydia Ko (4,6,11), Brittany Lang (4,9,11), Stacy Lewis (4,5,6,9,11), Brittany Lincicome (4,9,11), Pernilla Lindberg (4,11), Mo Martin (11), Park Sung-hyun (4,6,11), Ryu So-yeon (4,6,11), Lexi Thompson (4,5,6,9,11), Michelle Wie (4,6,9,11)

4. Professionals who have won an official LPGA tournament in the previous two calendar years and during the current year

Carlota Ciganda (6,9,11), Nasa Hataoka (11), Charley Hull (6,9,11), Ji Eun-hee (6,11), Moriya Jutanugarn (6,11), Kim Sei-young (5,6,11), Katherine Kirk (11), Ko Jin-young (6,11), Jessica Korda (6,11), Lee Mi-hyang (5,11), Minjee Lee (6,11), Mirim Lee (11), Caroline Masson (9,11), Haru Nomura (11), Annie Park (11), Jenny Shin (11), Amy Yang (5,6,11)

- Jang Ha-na (6) did not play.

5. Professionals who finished top-10 and ties at the previous year's Women's PGA Championship

Chella Choi (11), Kelly Shon (11)

6. Professionals ranked No. 1–30 on the Women's World Golf Rankings as of June 4, 2018

Lee Jeong-eun, Lizette Salas (9,11)

- Choi Hye-jin, Jiyai Shin, and Ai Suzuki did not play.

7. The top eight finishers at the 2017 LPGA T&CP National Championship

Heather Angell, Jean Bartholomew, Joanna Coe, Alison Curdt, Wendy Doolan, Ashley Grier, Charlotta Sörenstam

- Karen Paolozzi did not play.

8. The top finisher (not otherwise qualified via the 2017 LPGA T&CP National Championship) at the 2018 PGA Women's Stroke Play Championship

Lisa Grimes

9. Members of the European and United States Solheim Cup teams in 2017

Paula Creamer (11), Austin Ernst (11), Jodi Ewart Shadoff (11), Georgia Hall (11), Karine Icher (11), Catriona Matthew (11), Florentyna Parker, Emily Kristine Pedersen (11), Melissa Reid (11), Madelene Sagström (11), Angel Yin (11)

- Gerina Piller did not play.

10. Maximum of two sponsor invites

Jenny Haglund, Klára Spilková

11. LPGA members who have committed to the event, ranked in the order of their position on the 2018 official money list through the conclusion of the Walmart NW Arkansas Championship

Marina Alex, Brittany Altomare, Rebecca Artis, Aditi Ashok, Laetitia Beck, Céline Boutier, Nicole Broch Larsen, Ashleigh Buhai, Katie Burnett, Tiffany Chan, Sandra Changkija, Pei-Yun Chien, Cydney Clanton, Jacqui Concolino, Katelyn Dambaugh, Daniela Darquea, Perrine Delacour, Brianna Do, Lindy Duncan, Sandra Gal, Julieta Granada, Jaye Marie Green, Hannah Green, Mina Harigae, Caroline Hedwall, Céline Herbin, Daniela Holmqvist, Wei-Ling Hsu, M. J. Hur, Daniela Iacobelli, Caroline Inglis, Tiffany Joh, Haeji Kang, Kim Kaufman, Megan Khang, Christina Kim, Lauren Kim, P.K. Kongkraphan, Nelly Korda, Ólafía Þórunn Kristinsdóttir, Candie Kung, Cindy LaCrosse, Bronte Law, Maude-Aimee Leblanc, Lee Jeong-eun, Erynne Lee, Min Lee, Amelia Lewis, Lin Xiyu, Yu Liu, Gaby López, Lee Lopez, Nanna Koerstz Madsen, Brittany Marchand, Ally McDonald, Wichanee Meechai, Giulia Molinaro, Azahara Muñoz, Benyapa Niphatsophon, Su-Hyun Oh, Amy Olson, Ryann O'Toole, Lee-Anne Pace, Jane Park, Park Hee-young, Pornanong Phatlum, Sophia Popov, Morgan Pressel, Beatriz Recari, Robynn Ree, Paula Reto, Sherman Santiwiwatthanaphong, Alena Sharp, Sarah Jane Smith, Luna Sobrón Galmés, Jennifer Song, Mariah Stackhouse, Angela Stanford, Jackie Stoelting, Thidapa Suwannapura, Emma Talley, Kris Tamulis, Anne-Catherine Tanguay, Pannarat Thanapolboonyaras, Maria Torres, Ayako Uehara, Mariajo Uribe, Cheyenne Woods, Sakura Yokomine, Yoo Sun-young

- Lindsey Weaver did not play.

12. The remainder of the field will be filled by members who have committed to the event, ranked in the order of their position on the 2018 LPGA Priority List as of the commitment deadline

None needed

== Round summaries ==
=== First round ===
Thursday, June 28, 2018

| Place | Player | Score | To par |
|---|---|---|---|
| 1 | (South Korea) Park Sung-hyun | 66 | −6 |
| T2 | (United States) Brittany Altomare | 67 | −5 |
| T2 | (United States) Jaye Marie Green | 67 | −5 |
| T2 | (Canada) Brooke Henderson | 67 | −5 |
| T2 | (United States) Jessica Korda | 67 | −5 |
| T6 | (Israel) Laetitia Beck | 68 | −4 |
| T6 | (England) Charley Hull | 68 | −4 |
| T6 | (Thailand) Moriya Jutanugarn | 68 | −4 |
| T6 | (Canada) Maude-Aimee Leblanc | 68 | −4 |
| T10 | (Japan) Nasa Hataoka | 69 | −3 |
| T10 | (Australia) Minjee Lee | 69 | −3 |
| T10 | (United States) Amy Olson | 69 | −3 |
| T10 | (South Korea) Ryu So-yeon | 69 | −3 |
| T10 | (Canada) Alena Sharp | 69 | −3 |

=== Second round ===
Friday, June 29, 2018

| Place | Player | Score | To par |
|---|---|---|---|
| T1 | (Canada) Brooke Henderson | 67-71=138 | −6 |
| T1 | (South Korea) Park Sung-hyun | 66-72=138 | −6 |
| T1 | (South Korea) Ryu So-yeon | 69-69=138 | −6 |
| 4 | (Spain) Carlota Ciganda | 70-69=139 | −5 |
| T5 | (Thailand) Moriya Jutanugarn | 68-72=140 | −4 |
| T5 | (New Zealand) Lydia Ko | 74-66=140 | −4 |
| T5 | (United States) Annie Park | 71-69=140 | −4 |
| T8 | (United States) Jaye Marie Green | 67-74=141 | −3 |
| T8 | (Japan) Nasa Hataoka | 69-72=141 | −3 |
| T8 | (Sweden) Daniela Holmqvist | 70-71=141 | −3 |
| T8 | (Thailand) Wichanee Meechai | 71-70=141 | −3 |

=== Third round ===
Saturday, June 30, 2018

| Place | Player | Score | To par |
|---|---|---|---|
| 1 | (South Korea) Ryu So-yeon | 69-69-67=205 | −11 |
| 2 | (Canada) Brooke Henderson | 67-71-70=208 | −8 |
| 3 | (South Korea) Park Sung-hyun | 66-72-71=209 | −7 |
| 4 | (United States) Angel Yin | 73-69-68=210 | −6 |
| 5 | (England) Bronte Law | 72-70-69=211 | −5 |
| T6 | (Spain) Carlota Ciganda | 70-69-73=212 | −4 |
| T6 | (Sweden) Daniela Holmqvist | 70-71-71=212 | −4 |
| T6 | (South Korea) Kim Hyo-joo | 70-72-70=212 | −4 |
| T6 | (South Korea) In-Kyung Kim | 73-70-69=212 | −4 |
| T10 | (South Africa) Ashleigh Buhai | 72-70-71=213 | −3 |
| T10 | (United States) Lindy Duncan | 74-71-68=213 | −3 |
| T10 | (China) Shanshan Feng | 74-72-67=213 | −3 |
| T10 | (Thailand) Moriya Jutanugarn | 68-72-73=213 | −3 |
| T10 | (South Korea) Kim Sei-young | 71-71-71=213 | −3 |
| T10 | (South Korea) Ko Jin-young | 73-72-68=213 | −3 |
| T10 | (New Zealand) Lydia Ko | 74-66-73=213 | −3 |
| T10 | (United States) Jessica Korda | 67-75-71=213 | −3 |
| T10 | (United States) Ryann O'Toole | 73-71-69=213 | −3 |
| T10 | (United States) Annie Park | 71-69-73=213 | −3 |
| T10 | (United States) Lizette Salas | 70-74-69=213 | −3 |
| T10 | (Australia) Sarah Jane Smith | 73-72-68=213 | −3 |
| T10 | (South Korea) Amy Yang | 70-74-69=213 | −3 |

=== Final round ===
Sunday, July 1, 2018

| Place | Player | Score | To par | Prize money (US$) |
|---|---|---|---|---|
| T1 | (Japan) Nasa Hataoka | 69-72-73-64=278 | −10 | Playoff |
| T1 | (South Korea) Park Sung-hyun | 66-72-71-69=278 | −10 | Playoff |
| T1 | (South Korea) Ryu So-yeon | 69-69-67-73=278 | −10 | Playoff |
| T4 | (United States) Jessica Korda | 67-75-71-68=281 | −7 | 170,709 |
| T4 | (United States) Angel Yin | 73-69-68-71=281 | −7 | 170,709 |
| T6 | (Canada) Brooke Henderson | 67-71-70-74=282 | −6 | 114,421 |
| T6 | (England) Charley Hull | 68-75-72-67=282 | −6 | 114,421 |
| T8 | (United States) Jacqui Concolino | 70-73-73-67=283 | −5 | 82,741 |
| T8 | (South Korea) In-Kyung Kim | 73-70-69-71=283 | −5 | 82,741 |
| T8 | (United States) Lizette Salas | 70-74-69-70=283 | −5 | 82,741 |

==== Scorecard ====
Final round

| Hole | 1 | 2 | 3 | 4 | 5 | 6 | 7 | 8 | 9 | 10 | 11 | 12 | 13 | 14 | 15 | 16 | 17 | 18 |
|---|---|---|---|---|---|---|---|---|---|---|---|---|---|---|---|---|---|---|
| Par | 4 | 4 | 3 | 5 | 4 | 3 | 5 | 4 | 4 | 4 | 5 | 4 | 3 | 4 | 5 | 4 | 3 | 4 |
| (South Korea) Park | −7 | −7 | −8 | −9 | −9 | −9 | −9 | −9 | −9 | −9 | −9 | −9 | −9 | −10 | −10 | −10 | −10 | −10 |
| (Japan) Hataoka | −2 | −2 | −3 | −4 | −4 | −4 | −6 | −6 | −6 | −5 | −7 | −8 | −8 | −8 | −9 | −10 | −10 | −10 |
| (South Korea) Ryu | −11 | −9 | −9 | −9 | −9 | −10 | −11 | −11 | −11 | −11 | −12 | −12 | −11 | −11 | −11 | −12 | −10 | −10 |
| (United States) Korda | −4 | −3 | −4 | −4 | −4 | −5 | −5 | −4 | −5 | −5 | −6 | −6 | −6 | −7 | −7 | −7 | −7 | −7 |
| (United States) Yin | −7 | −6 | −7 | −6 | −5 | −5 | −6 | −7 | −7 | −7 | −8 | −8 | −7 | −8 | −7 | −8 | −8 | −7 |
| (Canada) Henderson | −8 | −7 | −7 | −7 | −6 | −5 | −6 | −6 | −6 | −6 | −6 | −6 | −6 | −6 | −5 | −5 | −6 | −6 |
| (England) Hull | −1 | −2 | −2 | −3 | −2 | −1 | −3 | −3 | −3 | −4 | −5 | −6 | −6 | −7 | −8 | −7 | −6 | −6 |

Cumulative tournament scores, relative to par

| Eagles | Birdie | Bogey | Double bogey |

=== Playoff ===
| Place | Player | Score | To par | Money ($) |
|---|---|---|---|---|
| 1 | (South Korea) Park Sung-hyun | 3-3 | −2 | 547,500 |
| T2 | (Japan) Nasa Hataoka | 3-4 | −1 | 290,806 |
| T2 | (South Korea) Ryu So-yeon | 4-x | E | 290,806 |
