= 2017 U.S. Women's Open =

Coordinates: 40.653°N 74.696°W

Tournament information
- Dates: July 13–16, 2017
- Location: Bedminster, New Jersey
- Courses: Trump National Golf Club, Old Course
- Organized by: USGA
- Tour: LPGA Tour

Statistics
- Par: 72
- Length: 6,732 yards (6,156 m)
- Field: 156 players, 62 made cut
- Cut: 146 (+2)
- Prize fund: $5.0 million
- Winner's share: $900,000

Champion
- (South Korea) Park Sung-hyun
- 277 (−11)

Location in the United States
Location in New Jersey

The 2017 U.S. Women's Open was the 72nd U.S. Women's Open, held July 13–16 at Trump National Golf Club in Bedminster, New Jersey, west of New York City.

The U.S. Women's Open is the oldest of the five current major championships and was the third of the 2017 season. With the largest purse in women's golf, increased to $5 million in 2017, it was televised by Fox Sports 1 and Fox Sports.

Park Sung-hyun won her first major title, two strokes ahead of amateur Choi Hye-jin. It was her first win on the LPGA Tour, after ten victories on the LPGA of Korea Tour. Seven strokes back at 143 (−1) after 36 holes, Park carded 134 (−10) on the weekend with consecutive rounds of 67.

== Qualifying and field ==
The championship is open to any female professional or amateur golfer with a USGA handicap index not exceeding 2.4. Players qualify by competing in one of twenty 36-hole qualifying tournaments held at sites across the United States and at international sites in China, England, Japan, and South Korea. Additional players were exempt from qualifying because of past performances in professional or amateur tournaments around the world.

=== Exempt from qualifying ===
Many players are exempt in multiple categories. Players are listed only once, in the first category in which they became exempt, with additional categories in parentheses () next to their names. Golfers qualifying in Category 14 who qualified in other categories are denoted with the tour by which they qualified.

1. Winners of the U.S. Women's Open for the last ten years (2007–2016)

Choi Na-yeon, Chun In-gee (8,12,13,14-KLPGA,16,17), Paula Creamer, Ji Eun-hee (10,16), Cristie Kerr (10,12,13,16,17), Brittany Lang (10,16,17), Inbee Park (5,6,7,9,12,13,16,17), Ryu So-yeon (7,12,13,16,17), Michelle Wie (17)

2. Winner and runner-up from the 2016 U.S. Women's Amateur (must be an amateur)

Virginia Elena Carta (a), Seong Eun-jeong (a)

3. Winner of the 2017 British Ladies Amateur Golf Championship (must be an amateur)

Leona Maguire (a,4)

4. Winner of the 2016 Mark H. McCormack Medal (Women's World Amateur Golf Ranking) (must be an amateur)

5. Winners of the Women's PGA Championship for the last five years (2013–2017)

Brooke Henderson (13,16,17), Danielle Kang (11,17)

6. Winners of the Ricoh Women's British Open for the last five years (2012–2016)

Ariya Jutanugarn (12,13,16,17), Stacy Lewis (10,16,17), Mo Martin (16,17), Jiyai Shin (14-JLPGA,16,17)

7. Winners of the ANA Inspiration for the last five years (2013–2017)

Lydia Ko (8,10,13,16,17), Brittany Lincicome (13,16,17), Lexi Thompson (12,13,16,17)

8. Winners of the Evian Championship for the last four years (2013–2016)

Kim Hyo-joo (16,17), Suzann Pettersen (16,17)

9. Winner of the 2016 Olympic Gold Medal

10. Ten lowest scorers and anyone tying for 10th place from the 2016 U.S. Women's Open

Jodi Ewart Shadoff (16,17), Anna Nordqvist (13,16,17), Park Sung-hyun (14-KLPGA,16,17), Gerina Piller (16,17), Amy Yang (12,13,16,17)

11. Top 75 money leaders from the 2016 final official LPGA money list

Marina Alex, Katie Burnett, Chella Choi (17), Carlota Ciganda (13,16,17), Jacqui Concolino, Austin Ernst (16,17), Shanshan Feng (13,16,17), Sandra Gal, Charley Hull (13,16,17), M. J. Hur (16,17), Karine Icher (16,17), Moriya Jutanugarn (17), Kim Kaufman, Megan Khang, Christina Kim, In-Kyung Kim (13,16,17), Kim Sei-young (12,13,16,17), Jessica Korda (16,17), Candie Kung, Alison Lee (16), Lee Mi-hyang (17), Minjee Lee (13,16,17), Mirim Lee (12,13,16,17), Lin Xiyu, Pernilla Lindberg, Gaby López, Caroline Masson (13), Catriona Matthew, Ai Miyazato, Mika Miyazato, Azahara Muñoz, Haru Nomura (16,17), Su-Hyun Oh, Ryann O'Toole, Lee-Anne Pace, Park Hee-young, Pornanong Phatlum (16), Morgan Pressel, Beatriz Recari, Paula Reto, Lizette Salas, Alena Sharp, Jenny Shin (16,17), Kelly Shon, Sarah Jane Smith, Jennifer Song, Angela Stanford, Kris Tamulis, Mariajo Uribe, Karrie Webb, Jing Yan, Sakura Yokomine

- Jang Ha-na (12,13,16,17) did not play.

12. Top 10 money leaders from the 2017 official LPGA money list, through the close of entries on May 17

13. Winners of LPGA co-sponsored events, whose victories are considered official, from the conclusion of the 2016 U.S. Women's Open to the initiation of the 2017 U.S. Women's Open

Katherine Kirk

14. Top five money leaders from the 2016 Japan LPGA Tour, Korea LPGA Tour and Ladies European Tour

Beth Allen, Aditi Ashok, Bae Seon-woo (16), Isabelle Boineau, Georgia Hall, Jang Su-yeon, Kim Ha-neul (16,17), Ko Jin-young (16,17), Lee Seung-hyun, Florentyna Parker, Ai Suzuki (16,17)

- Lee Bo-mee (16,17) and Ritsuko Ryu (16) did not play.

15. Top three money leaders from the 2016 China LPGA Tour.

Supamas Sangchan, Zhang Weiwei

- Shi Yuting did not play.

16. Top 50 point leaders from the current Rolex Rankings and anyone tying for 50th place as of May 17

Kim Min-sun (17), Lee Min-young (17), Lee Jeong-eun

- Ahn Sun-ju (17), Jeon Mi-jeong, Kim Hae-rym (17), and Teresa Lu (17) did not play.

17. Top 50 point leaders from the current Rolex Rankings and anyone tying for 50th place as of July 9

- Kim Ji-hyun did not play.

18. Special exemptions selected by the USGA

=== Qualifiers ===
Additional players qualified through sectional qualifying tournaments in May and June at sites in the United States, China, South Korea, England, and Japan.

May 22 at The Country Club at DC Ranch, Scottsdale, Arizona

Kyung Kim
Emma Henrikson

May 22 at Hino Golf Club, Hino, Shiga, Japan

Haruka Morita-WanyaoLu
Rumi Yoshiba
Tsai Pei-Ying
Fumika Kawagishi

May 22 at Butler Country Club, Butler, Pennsylvania

Bailey Tardy (a)
Laura Gonzalez Escallon

May 24 at Riverdale Dunes Golf Club, Brighton, Colorado

Jennifer Kupcho (a)
Robyn Choi (a)

May 28 at Poipu Bay Golf Club, Koloa, Hawaii

Kang So-whi (a)

May 30 at Industry Hills Golf Club (Eisenhower course), City of Industry, California

Brianna Do
Cheyenne Woods

May 30 at Diamond Oaks Country Club, Fort Worth, Texas

Dylan Kim (a)
Morgane Métraux (a)

May 31 at Legends Golf Club, Prior Lake, Minnesota

Belén Mozo
Casey Danielson

Jun 2 at BallenIsles Country Club (East course), Palm Beach Gardens, Florida

Dana Williams (a)
August Kim

Jun 5 at Oak Valley Golf Club, Beaumont, California

Paphangkorn Tavatanakit (a)
Mariel Galdiano (a)

Jun 5 at Lake Merced Golf Club, Daly City, California

Emily Childs
Ty Akabane (a)

Jun 5 at Lan Hai International Golf Club, Shanghai, China

Liu Yan

Jun 5 at Buckinghamshire Golf Club, Buckinghamshire, England

Carly Booth
Caroline Hedwall
Meghan MacLaren
Kelsey MacDonald

Jun 5 at The Legends at Chateau Elan, Braselton, Georgia

Jane Park
Rachel Heck (a)

Jun 5 at Hidden Creek Golf Club, Egg Harbor Township, New Jersey

Samantha Wagner
Thidapa Suwannapura
Stephanie Meadow

Jun 6/7 at South Shore Country Club, Hingham, Massachusetts

Nanna Koerstz Madsen

Jun 7 at Bogey Hills Country Club, St Louis, Missouri

Ally McDonald
Pei-Yun Chien

Jun 7 at The Woodlands Country Club (Gary Player course), Spring, Texas

Anne Chen (a)
Marissa Steen

Jun 9 at Sugar Mill Country Club, New Smyrna Beach, Florida

Jessica Welch
Wei-Ling Hsu

Jun 12 at Bradenton Country Club, Bradenton, Florida

Emma Bradley (a)

Jun 12 at Prestwick Country Club, Frankfort, Illinois

Ashleigh Buhai
Elin Arvidsson

Jun 12 at Woo Jeong Hills Country Club, Cheonan, South Korea

Choi Hye-jin (a)

Jun 12 at Muskegon Country Club, Muskegon, Michigan

Tiffany Joh
Lee Jeong-eun

Jun 12 at Governors Course, Chapel Hill, North Carolina

Natalie Srinivasan (a)
Lauren Stephenson (a)

Jun 12 at OGA Golf Club, Woodburn, Oregon

Becky Morgan
Brooke Seay (a)

=== Alternates added to field ===
The following players were added to the field before the start of the tournament when spots reserved for exemptions in various categories were not used and to replace players who withdrew from the tournament.

Sara Banke, Valdis Thora Jonsdottir, Nelly Korda, Bronte Law, Madelene Sagström, Maddie Szeryk, Alison Walshe, Ayaka Watanabe, Angel Yin

== Course layout ==
Trump National Golf Club, Old Course

Hole	1	2	3	4	5	6	7	8	9	Out	10	11	12	13	14	15	16	17	18	In	Total
Yards	543	384	406	192	381	407	158	535	419	3,425	411	373	347	402	179	518	162	394	521	3,307	6,732
Par	5	4	4	3	4	4	3	5	4	36	4	4	4	4	3	5	3	4	5	36	72

== Round summaries ==
=== First round ===
Thursday and Friday, July 13–14, 2017

Following over two hours of weather delays, play was suspended due to darkness on Thursday at approximately 8:33 pm EDT; 39 players were on the course and completed their rounds on Friday morning.

Place	Player	Score	To par
1	(China) Shanshan Feng	66	−6
2	(South Korea) Amy Yang	67	−5
T3	(New Zealand) Lydia Ko	68	−4
T3	(South Korea) Ryu So-yeon	68	−4
T3	(Japan) Rumi Yoshiba	68	−4
T6	(South Korea) Choi Hye-jin (a)	69	−3
T6	(Spain) Carlota Ciganda	69	−3
T6	(United States) Cristie Kerr	69	−3
T6	(United States) Megan Khang	69	−3
T6	(South Korea) Kim Sei-young	69	−3
T6	(South Korea) Lee Jeong-eun	69	−3
T6	(Australia) Minjee Lee	69	−3

=== Second round ===
Friday, July 14, 2017

Place	Player	Score	To par
1	(China) Shanshan Feng	66-70=136	−8
T2	(South Korea) Choi Hye-jin (a)	69-69=138	−6
T2	(South Korea) Lee Jeong-eun	69-69=138	−6
T2	(South Korea) Amy Yang	67-71=138	−6
5	(South Korea) Bae Seon-woo	70-69=139	−5
T6	(Spain) Carlota Ciganda	69-71=140	−4
T6	(South Korea) Chun In-gee	70-70=140	−4
T6	(Japan) Haru Nomura	71-69=140	−4
T6	(South Korea) Ryu So-yeon	68-72=140	−4
T10	(United States) Marina Alex	71-70=141	−3
T10	(Canada) Brooke Henderson	70-71=141	−3
T10	(New Zealand) Lydia Ko	71-70=141	−3
T10	(Australia) Minjee Lee	68-73=141	−3

=== Third round ===
Saturday, July 15, 2017

Place	Player	Score	To par
1	(China) Shanshan Feng	66-70-71=207	−9
T2	(South Korea) Choi Hye-jin (a)	69-69-70=208	−8
T2	(South Korea) Amy Yang	67-71-70=208	−8
4	(South Korea) Park Sung-hyun	73-70-67=210	−6
T5	(South Korea) Lee Jeong-eun	69-69-73=211	−5
T5	(South Korea) Mirim Lee	70-74-67=211	−5
T5	(South Korea) Ryu So-yeon	68-72-71=211	−5
T8	(Spain) Carlota Ciganda	69-71-72=212	−4
T8	(United States) Cristie Kerr	69-73-70=212	−4
T10	(South Korea) Bae Seon-woo	70-69-74=213	−3
T10	(South Korea) M. J. Hur	71-72-70=213	−3
T10	(South Korea) Ji Eun-hee	73-71-69=213	−3
T10	(Japan) Haru Nomura	71-69-73=213	−3

=== Final round ===
Sunday, July 16, 2017

Place	Player	Score	To par	Money ($)
1	(South Korea) Park Sung-hyun	73-70-67-67=277	−11	900,000
2	(South Korea) Choi Hye-jin (a)	69-69-70-71=279	−9	0
T3	(South Korea) M. J. Hur	71-72-70-68=281	−7	442,479
T3	(South Korea) Ryu So-yeon	68-72-71-70=281	−7	442,479
T5	(Spain) Carlota Ciganda	69-71-72-70=282	−6	207,269
T5	(China) Shanshan Feng	66-70-71-75=282	−6	207,269
T5	(South Korea) Lee Jeong-eun	69-69-73-71=282	−6	207,269
T8	(South Korea) Kim Sei-young	69-73-72-69=283	−5	145,234
T8	(South Korea) Mirim Lee	70-74-67-72=283	−5	145,234
T8	(South Korea) Amy Yang	67-71-70-75=283	−5	145,234

==== Scorecard ====
Final round

Hole	1	2	3	4	5	6	7	8	9	10	11	12	13	14	15	16	17	18
Par	5	4	4	3	4	4	3	5	4	4	4	4	4	3	5	3	4	5
(South Korea) Park	−6	−7	−7	−7	−8	−8	−8	−9	−8	−8	−8	−9	−9	−9	−10	−10	−11	−11
(South Korea) Choi	−8	−9	−9	−9	−9	−9	−10	−10	−10	−9	−9	−9	−9	−9	−10	−8	−8	−9
(China) Feng	−9	−9	−9	−8	−8	−8	−8	−8	−8	−8	−9	−9	−9	−9	−9	−9	−9	−6
(South Korea) Yang	−8	−8	−7	−7	−6	−6	−5	−5	−5	−4	−4	−4	−4	−4	−5	−5	−5	−5

Cumulative tournament scores, relative to par

Birdie	Bogey	Double bogey	Triple bogey+
