= 2016 LPGA of Korea Tour =

The 2016 LPGA of Korea Tour is the 39th season of the LPGA of Korea Tour, the professional golf tour for women operated by the Korea Ladies Professional Golf' Association. It consists of 37 golf tournaments, 31 played in South Korea, three in China, two in Vietnam, and one in Japan.

== Schedule ==
The number in parentheses after winners' names show the player's total number wins in official money individual events on the LPGA of Korea Tour, including that event.

Dates	Tournament	Host city	Prize fund (KRW)	Winner	Notes
Dec 12–14	Hyundai China Ladies Open	(China) Haikou	US$550,000	(South Korea) Park Sung-hyun (4)	Co-sanctioned by China LPGA Tour
Feb 21–22	Korea Investment & Securities Championship	(Vietnam) Hanoi	200,000,000	(South Korea) Chung Ye-na (n/a)	Unofficial tournament
Mar 10–13	World Ladies Championship	(China) Dongguan	US$800,000	(South Korea) Lee Jung-min (8) - individual (South Korea) Ko Jin-young & Lee Jung-min - team	New tournament Co-sanctioned by China LPGA Tour and Ladies European Tour
Mar 25–27	The Dalat at 1200 Ladies Championship	(Vietnam) Da Lat	500,000,000	(South Korea) Cho Jeong-min (1)	New tournament
Apr 7–10	Lotte Mart Women's Open	(South Korea) Seogwipo	600,000,000	(South Korea) Jang Su-yeon (1)	
Apr 15–17	Samchully Together Open	(South Korea) Ansan	800,000,000	(South Korea) Park Sung-hyun (5)	
Apr 22–24	Nexen-Saintnine Masters	(South Korea) Gimhae	500,000,000	(South Korea) Park Sung-hyun (6)	
Apr 29 – May 1	KG-Edaily Ladies Open	(South Korea) Yongin	500,000,000	(South Korea) Ko Jin-young (5)	
May 6–8	KyoChon Honey Ladies Open	(South Korea) Gunsan	500,000,000	(South Korea) Kim Hae-rym (1)	
May 13–15	NH Investment & Securities Ladies Championship	(South Korea) Yongin	700,000,000	(South Korea) Jang Su-yeon (2)	
May 19–22	Doosan Match Play Championship	(South Korea) Chuncheon	600,000,000	(South Korea) Park Sung-hyun (7)	
May 27–29	E1 Charity Open	(South Korea) Icheon	600,000,000	(South Korea) Bae Seon-woo (1)	
Jun 3–5	Lotte Cantata Ladies Open	(South Korea) Seogwipo	600,000,000	(South Korea) Park Seong-weon (1)	
Jun 10–12	S-Oil Champions Invitational	(South Korea) Jeju	700,000,000	(South Korea) Park Ji-young (1)	
Jun 16–19	**Kia Motors Korea Women's Open Championship**	(South Korea) Incheon	1,000,000,000	(South Korea) Ahn Shi-hyun (3)	
Jun 23–26	BC Card-Hankyung Ladies Cup	(South Korea) Ansan	700,000,000	(South Korea) Oh Ji-hyun (2)	
Jul 1–3	Kumho Tire Ladies Open	(China) Weihai	500,000,000	(South Korea) Lee Min-young (4)	Co-sanctioned by China LPGA Tour
Jul 8–10	Ilhwa ChoJung Sparkling Water Ladies Open	(South Korea) Pyeongchang	500,000,000	(South Korea) Lee So-young (1)	
Jul 14–17	BMW Ladies Championship	(South Korea) Incheon	1,200,000,000	(South Korea) Ko Jin-young (6)	
Jul 22–24	MY Munyoung Queens Park Championship	(South Korea) Paju	500,000,000	(South Korea) Lee Seung-hyun (4)	New tournament
Jul 29–31	Caido-MBC Plus Women's Open	(South Korea) Gyeongsan	500,000,000	(South Korea) Cho Jeong-min (2)	New tournament
Aug 5–7	Jeju Samdasoo Masters	(South Korea) Jeju	500,000,000	(South Korea) Park Sung-hyun (8)	
Aug 18–21	Bogner-MBN Ladies Open	(South Korea) Yangpyeong	500,000,000	(South Korea) Park Sung-hyun (9)	
Aug 25–28	High1 Resort Ladies Open	(South Korea) Jeongseon	800,000,000	(South Korea) Kim Ye-jin (1)	
Sep 1–4	Hanwha Finance Classic	(South Korea) Taean	1,200,000,000	(South Korea) Park Sung-hyun (10)	
Sep 8–11	**ISU Group KLPGA Championship**	(South Korea) Incheon	800,000,000	(South Korea) Bae Seon-woo (2)	
Sep 23–25	Mirae Asset Daewoo Classic	(South Korea) Chuncheon	600,000,000	(South Korea) Yang Chae-lin (1)	
Sep 30 – Oct 2	OK! Savings Bank Pak Se-ri Invitational	(South Korea) Yeoju	600,000,000	(South Korea) Kim Min-sun (3)	
Oct 6–9	**Hite Jinro Championship**	(South Korea) Yeoju	800,000,000	(South Korea) Ko Jin-young (7)	
Oct 13–16	LPGA KEB Hana Bank Championship	(South Korea) Incheon	US$2,000,000	(Spain) Carlota Ciganda (n/a)	Co-sanctioned by LPGA Tour
Oct 20–23	**KB Financial Star Championship**	(South Korea) Yangju	800,000,000	(South Korea) Kim Hae-rym (2)	
Oct 28–30	Honma Golf-Seoul Economic Daily Ladies Classic	(South Korea) Incheon	500,000,000	(South Korea) Lee Seung-hyun (5)	
Nov 4–6	Fantom Classic	(South Korea) Yongin	600,000,000	(South Korea) Hong Jin-joo (2)	
Nov 11–13	ADT CAPS Championship	(South Korea) Icheon	500,000,000	(South Korea) Cho Yoon-ji (3)	
Dec 4–6	The Queens	(Japan) Aichi	¥100,000,000	LPGA of Korea Tour	Team match play

Events in bold are majors.
