= Seowon Valley Country Club =

Golf course in Paju, South Korea

Club information
- Established: 2004
- Type: Private
- Owner: Daebo Group
- Tota holes: 27
- Tournaments: BMW Ladies Championship
- Greens: Bentgrass
- Fairways: Kentucky bluegrass
- Website: https://www.seowongolf.co.kr

The Seowon Valley Country Club (Korean: 서원힐스) is a golf course in Paju, South Korea. The course hosts several events on the LPGA of Korea tour and the BMW Ladies Championship of the LPGA tour.

The Seowon Valley Country Club opened in 2000. The Hills golf course opened in 2004, initially with 9 holes. In 2012, an 18-hole West and South courses were opened. Today, the country club has two golf courses, the private Valley course, and the public tournament Hills course. The BMW Ladies Championship is held on the Hills course.

From 2020 to 2023, the KPGA Tour's LG Signature Players Championship was held at Seowon Valley. During the 2025 KLPGA season, the course will host the Daebo HausD Open.

Prior to the 2023 outing of the BMW Ladies Championship, the Hills course underwent a redesign by architect David Dale.

In addition to golf events, the Seowon Valley Country Club hosts weddings, and an annual concert on the green on the course that attracts more than 600,000 spectators.
