= 2019 Women's British Open =

2019 AIG Women's British Open

Tournament information
- Dates: 1–4 August 2019
- Location: Milton Keynes, Buckinghamshire, England; 51.991°N 0.665°W
- Course: Woburn Golf Club
- Organized by: The R&A
- Tours: Ladies European Tour; LPGA Tour

Statistics
- Par: 72
- Length: 6,463 yards (5,910 m)
- Field: 144 players, 72 after cut
- Cut: 145 (+1)
- Prize fund: $4,500,000 €4,385,404
- Winner's share: $675,000 €657,811

Champion
- (Japan) Hinako Shibuno
- 270 (−18)
- Location in the United Kingdom Location in England

The 2019 AIG Women's British Open was played from 1–4 August in England at Woburn Golf Club in Milton Keynes, Buckinghamshire, fifty miles (80 km) northwest of London. It was the 43rd Women's British Open, the nineteenthth as a major championship on the LPGA Tour, and the eleventh at Woburn.

Hinako Shibuno, playing for the first time outside of Japan and in her first major, won with 270 (−18), one stroke ahead of runner-up Lizette Salas of the United States. Shibuno, a twenty-year-old-rookie on the LPGA of Japan Tour, had already won twice on that tour in 2019, and added two more in the fall.

== Field ==
The field was 144 players, and most earned exemptions based on past performance on the Ladies European Tour, the LPGA Tour, previous major championships, or with a high ranking in the Women's World Golf Rankings. The rest of the field earned entry by successfully competing in qualifying tournaments open to any female golfer, professional or amateur, with a low handicap.

There were 16 exemption categories for the 2019 Women's British Open:

1. The top 15 finishers (and ties) from the 2018 Women's British Open.

Brittany Altomare, Carlota Ciganda, Shanshan Feng (8), Jaye Marie Green, Georgia Hall (9,11), Brooke Henderson (8,12), Mamiko Higa, Ariya Jutanugarn (9,11,12), Kim Sei-young (8), Lydia Ko (12), Lee Jeong-eun, Minjee Lee (8), Yu Liu, Teresa Lu, Su-Hyun Oh, Park Sung-hyun (8,12), Pornanong Phatlum, Ryu So-yeon (12), Thidapa Suwannapura

2. The top 10 Ladies European Tour members in the Women's World Golf Rankings not exempt under (1) as of 1 July.

Céline Boutier (5,8), Jodi Ewart Shadoff (5), Charley Hull (3,5,8), In-Kyung Kim (3,5,11), Bronte Law (3,5,8), Pernilla Lindberg (12), Caroline Masson (5), Azahara Muñoz (3,5), Anna Nordqvist (5,12), Madelene Sagström (5)

3. The top 30 LPGA Tour members in the Women's World Golf Rankings not exempt under (1) as of 1 July.

Marina Alex, Chun In-gee (12), Austin Ernst, Hannah Green (8,12), Nasa Hataoka (8), Ji Eun-hee (8), Moriya Jutanugarn, Danielle Kang (12), Cristie Kerr, Kim Hyo-joo, Ko Jin-young (8,12), Jessica Korda, Nelly Korda (8), Lee Jeong-eun (8,9,12), Lee Mi-hyang, Gaby López, Amy Olson, Annie Park, Inbee Park (11,12), Lizette Salas, Jenny Shin, Angela Stanford (12), Lexi Thompson (8), Amy Yang (8), Angel Yin

- Brittany Lincicome (12) did not play.

4. The top 25 on the current LET Order of Merit not exempt under (1) or (2) as of 1 July.

Beth Allen, Carly Booth, Lina Boqvist, Lynn Carlsson, Olivia Cowan, Gabriella Cowley, Tonje Daffinrud, Diksha Dagar (8), Annabel Dimmock (8), Laura Fuenfstueck, Jenny Haglund, Caroline Hedwall, Esther Henseleit, Céline Herbin (8), Nuria Iturrioz (8), Felicity Johnson, Sarah Kemp (5), Karolin Lampert, Camilla Lennarth, Meghan MacLaren (8), Katja Pogačar, Marianne Skarpnord (8), Charlotte Thompson, Anne Van Dam (8), Christine Wolf

5. The top 40 on the current LPGA Tour money list not exempt under (1) or (3) as of 1 July.

Pajaree Anannarukarn, Nicole Broch Larsen, Ashleigh Buhai, Chella Choi, Paula Creamer, Daniela Darquea, Lindy Duncan, María Fassi, Kristen Gillman, Wei-Ling Hsu, Haeji Kang, Megan Khang, Katherine Kirk, Mirim Lee, Brittany Lang, Stacy Lewis (11), Lin Xiyu, Nanna Koerstz Madsen, Ally McDonald, Ryann O'Toole, Gerina Piller, Morgan Pressel, Melissa Reid, Sarah Schmelzel, Alena Sharp, Jennifer Song, Mariah Stackhouse, Lauren Stephenson, Charlotte Thomas, Maria Torres, Ayako Uehara, Jing Yan, Sakura Yokomine

- Haru Nomura did not play.

6. The top five on the current LPGA of Japan Tour (JLPGA) money list not exempt under (1), (2), (3) as of 1 July.

Minami Katsu, Hinako Shibuno, Ai Suzuki, Momoko Ueda

- Jiyai Shin (11) did not play.

7. The top two on the current LPGA of Korea Tour (KLPGA) money list not exempt under (1), (2), (3), or (6) as of 1 July.

Choi Hye-jin, Lee Da-yeon

- Cho Jeong-min did not play.

8. Winners of any recognised LET or LPGA Tour events in the calendar year 2019.

Cydney Clanton, Atthaya Thitikul (a)

9. Winners of the 2018 LET, LPGA, JLPGA and KLPGA money lists.

- Ahn Sun-ju did not play.

10. The top 30 in the Women's World Golf Rankings, not exempt above as of 1 July.

11. Winners of the Women's British Open, under age 60, provided they are still active.

Laura Davies, Catriona Matthew, Karrie Webb

- Mo Martin and Yani Tseng did not play.

12. Winners of the last five editions of the U.S. Women's Open, ANA Inspiration, and Women's PGA Championship, and The Evian Championship.

Brittany Lang

13. The leading five LPGA Tour members in the 2019 Marathon Classic who have entered the Championship and who are not otherwise exempt.

Tiffany Joh, Jennifer Kupcho, Linnea Strom, Mariajo Uribe, Pavarisa Yoktuan

14. The leading three LET members in the 2019 Ladies European Thailand Championship, who have entered the Championship and who are not otherwise exempt.

Carmen Alonso and Kanyalak Preedasuttijit did not play.

15. The 2019 Women's Amateur Asia-Pacific champion, 2019 Women's Amateur Championship champion, 2018 U.S. Women's Amateur champion, 2019 European Ladies Amateur Championship champion, the 2018 Mark H. McCormack Medal winner, and the highest ranked women in the World Amateur Golf Ranking from Great Britain and Ireland as of week 25, and provided they are still amateurs at the time of the Championship

Alice Hewson, Emily Toy, Yuka Yasuda

Kristen Gillman forfeited her exemption as U.S. Women's Amateur champion by turning professional in November 2018. (She qualified under category 5.)
Jennifer Kupcho forfeited her exemption as the Mark H. McCormack Medal winner by turning professional in May 2019. (She qualified under category 13.)
Olivia Mehaffey did not play.

16. Any player who did not compete in the previous year's Women's British Open due to maternity, who subsequently received an extension of membership for the maternity from the player's home tour in the previous year, provided she was otherwise qualified to compete in the previous year's Women's British Open.

Karine Icher

17. Balance of the 90 LPGA Tour members.

M. J. Hur

Qualifiers: Jacqui Concolino, Valentine Derrey, Sandra Gal, Kylie Henry, Whitney Hillier, Frida Kinhult (a), Cheyenne Knight, Noora Komulainen, Ingrid Lindblad (a), Agathe Sauzon, Emma Spitz (a)

== Round summaries ==
=== First round ===
Thursday, 1 August 2019

Place	Player	Score	To par
1	(South Africa) Ashleigh Buhai	65	−7
T2	(United States) Danielle Kang	66	−6
T2	(Japan) Hinako Shibuno	66	−6
T4	(England) Charley Hull	67	−5
T4	(Thailand) Moriya Jutanugarn	67	−5
T4	(United States) Megan Khang	67	−5
T4	(South Korea) Park Sung-hyun	67	−5
T8	(Thailand) Ariya Jutanugarn	68	−4
T8	(South Korea) Ko Jin-young	68	−4
T8	(South Korea) Lee Jeong-eun	68	−4

=== Second round ===
Friday, 2 August 2019

Place	Player	Score	To par
1	(South Africa) Ashleigh Buhai	65-67=132	−12
2	(Japan) Hinako Shibuno	66-69=135	−9
3	(United States) Lizette Salas	69-67=136	−8
T4	(France) Céline Boutier	71-66=137	−7
T4	(England) Charley Hull	67-70=137	−7
T4	(England) Bronte Law	70-67=137	−7
T4	(Germany) Caroline Masson	69-68=137	−7
T4	(South Korea) Park Sung-hyun	67-70=137	−7
T9	(Spain) Carlota Ciganda	69-69=138	−6
T9	(England) Georgia Hall	69-69=138	−6
T9	(Thailand) Ariya Jutanugarn	68-70=138	−6
T9	(United States) Danielle Kang	66-72=138	−6
T9	(South Korea) Ko Jin-young	68-70=138	−6

=== Third round ===
Saturday, 3 August 2019

Place	Player	Score	To par
1	(Japan) Hinako Shibuno	66-69-67=202	−14
2	(South Africa) Ashleigh Buhai	65-67-72=204	−12
3	(South Korea) Park Sung-hyun	67-70-68=205	−11
T4	(South Korea) Ko Jin-young	68-70-68=206	−10
T4	(United States) Morgan Pressel	69-71-66=206	−10
T4	(United States) Lizette Salas	69-67-70=206	−10
T7	(Spain) Carlota Ciganda	69-69-69=207	−9
T7	(England) Charley Hull	67-70-70=207	−9
T7	(England) Bronte Law	70-67-70=207	−9
T10	(South Korea) Lee Jeong-eun	68-71-69=208	−8
T10	(China) Jing Yan	71-70-67=208	−8

=== Final round ===
Sunday, 4 August 2019

Place	Player	Score	To par	Money (US$)
1	(Japan) Hinako Shibuno	66-69-67-68=270	−18	675,000
2	(United States) Lizette Salas	69-67-70-65=271	−17	409,838
3	(South Korea) Ko Jin-young	68-70-68-66=272	−16	297,309
4	(United States) Morgan Pressel	69-71-66-67=273	−15	229,992
5	(South Africa) Ashleigh Buhai	65-67-72-70=274	−14	185,118
6	(France) Céline Boutier	71-66-73-66=276	−12	151,459
7	(Spain) Carlota Ciganda	69-69-69-70=277	−11	126,777
8	(South Korea) Park Sung-hyun	67-70-68-73=278	−10	111,072
T9	(United States) Nelly Korda	70-69-72-68=279	−9	95,364
T9	(South Korea) Lee Jeong-eun	68-71-69-71=279	−9	95,364

==== Scorecard ====
Final round

Hole	1	2	3	4	5	6	7	8	9	10	11	12	13	14	15	16	17	18
Par	4	5	4	4	4	3	5	3	4	4	5	4	4	3	5	4	3	4
(Japan) Shibuno	−14	−14	−12	−12	−13	−13	−14	−13	−13	−14	−14	−15	−16	−16	−17	−17	−17	−18
(United States) Salas	−11	−12	−12	−13	−13	−12	−13	−13	−14	−15	−16	−16	−16	−16	−17	−17	−17	−17
(South Korea) Ko	−10	−10	−10	−10	−11	−12	−13	−13	−13	−14	−14	−15	−16	−16	−16	−16	−16	−16
(United States) Pressel	−10	−10	−10	−10	−10	−10	−10	−11	−11	−11	−13	−13	−14	−15	−15	−16	−16	−15
(South Africa) Buhai	−11	−11	−11	−12	−12	−13	−13	−13	−12	−13	−13	−14	−15	−15	−15	−14	−14	−14
(France) Boutier	−6	−7	−7	−7	−7	−7	−7	−7	−8	−8	−9	−9	−9	−9	−10	−11	−12	−12
(Spain) Ciganda	−8	−8	−8	−7	−7	−7	−8	−8	−8	−8	−8	−9	−9	−9	−11	−11	−11	−11
(South Korea) Park	−11	−11	−10	−10	−10	−10	−10	−10	−11	−11	−11	−12	−12	−11	−11	−11	−11	−10

Cumulative tournament scores, relative to par

Eagle	Birdie	Bogey	Double bogey

== Final round ratings ==
1.186 million on NBC, in the USA
