= Lee Jeong-eun (golfer, born 1996) =

South Korean professional golfer (born 1996)

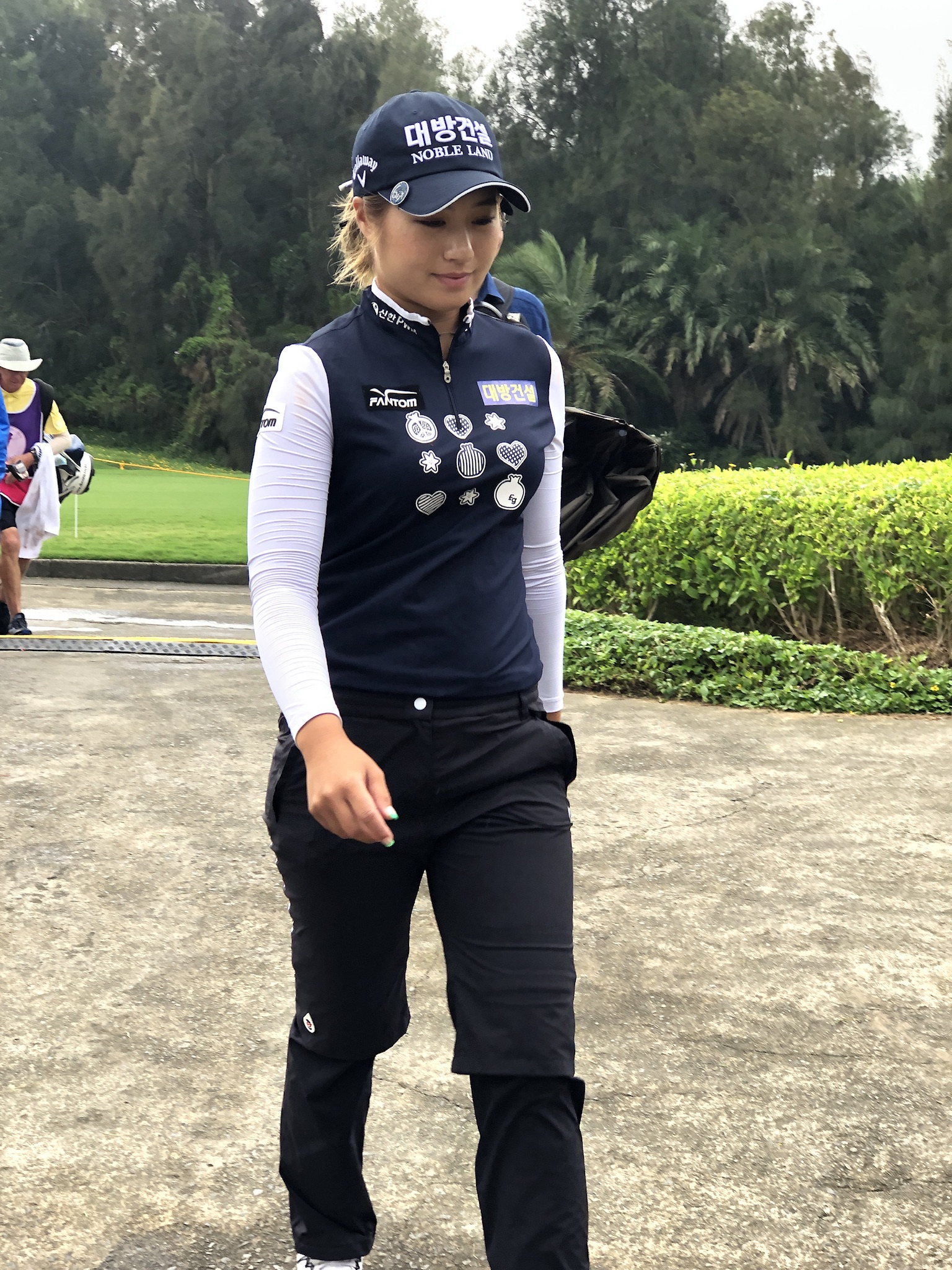
- Lee in October 2019

Personal information
- Nationality: South Korea
- Born: 28 May 1996 (age 30) Suncheon, Jeollanam-do, South Korea
- Height: 5 ft 5 in (165 cm)

Career
- Sport: Golf
- Turned professional: 2015
- Current tours: Epson Tour; LPGA Tour; LPGA of Korea Tour
- Professional wins: 9

Number of wins by tour
- LPGA Tour: 1
- LPGA of Korea Tour: 6
- Epson Tour: 1
- Other: 1

Best results in LPGA major championships (wins: 1)
- Chevron Championship: T6: 2019
- Women's PGA C'ship: T30: 2019
- U.S. Women's Open: Won: 2019
- Women's British Open: T9: 2019
- Evian Championship: 2nd: 2021

Achievements and awards
- LPGA of Korea Tour leading money winner: 2017, 2018
- LPGA Rookie of the Year: 2019
Medal record
Summer Universiade
Gold medal – first place	2015 Gwangju	Individual
Gold medal – first place	2015 Gwangju	Women's team

Lee Jeong-eun (Korean: 이정은; Hanja: 李晶恩; born 28 May 1996) is a South Korean professional golfer who currently plays on the LPGA Tour and the LPGA of Korea Tour. For scoring purposes, she is called Jeongeun Lee6 to differentiate herself from other Korean LPGA golfers with that name, including the older Jeongeun Lee5.

In 2019, Lee won her first major championship at the U.S. Women's Open, and was named the 2019 LPGA Louise Suggs Rolex Rookie of the Year.

== LPGA of Korea Tour ==
Lee began playing on the LPGA of Korea Tour in 2016. When she joined the tour, there had already been five other players with the same name; the like-named players were differentiated by a number, so she started to be called "Jeongeun Lee6". Lee is a six-time champion on tour, winning four events in 2017 and two in 2018. She also led the money list both years.

== LPGA Tour ==
Lee played her first LPGA Tour event in 2017, finishing in a tie for fifth place at the U.S. Women's Open. She made six starts in 2018, her best finish a tie for sixth at the Evian Championship.

In November 2018, Lee won the LPGA Q-Series and joined the tour full-time in 2019. In June 2019, she won the U.S. Women's Open by two strokes over Ryu So-yeon, Lexi Thompson and Angel Yin. It was her first victory on the LPGA Tour in addition to being her first major championship.

In July 2021, Lee tied the major championship scoring record with a 61 in the second round of the Evian Championship. She took a five-shot lead into the final round but ended up losing in a playoff to Minjee Lee.

== Professional wins (9) ==
=== LPGA Tour wins (1) ===
Legend
Major championships (1)
Other LPGA Tour (0)

No.	Date	Tournament	Winning score	Margin of victory	Runners-up	Winner's share ($)
1	2 Jun 2019	**U.S. Women's Open**	−6 (70-69-69-70=278)	2 strokes	(South Korea) Ryu So-yeon, (United States) Lexi Thompson, (United States) Angel Yin	1,000,000

LPGA Tour playoff record (0–2)

No.	Year	Tournament	Opponent(s)	Result
1	2019	LPGA Mediheal Championship	(South Korea) Kim Sei-young, (England) Bronte Law	Kim won with birdie on first extra hole
2	2021	**The Evian Championship**	(Australia) Minjee Lee	Lost to birdie on first extra hole

=== LPGA of Korea Tour wins (6) ===
- 2017 (4) Lotte Rent-a-Car Women's Open, MY Munyoung Queens Park Championship, High1 Resort Ladies Open, OK! Savings Bank Pak Se-ri Invitational
- 2018 (2) **Hanwha Classic**, **KB Financial Star Championship**

Events in bold are KLPGA majors.

=== All Thailand Golf Tour wins (1) ===
- 2018 Singha E-San Open

=== Epson Tour wins (1) ===
- 2026 IOA Golf Classic

== Major championships ==
=== Wins (1) ===
Year	Championship	54 holes	Winning score	Margin	Runners-up
2019	U.S. Women's Open	2 shot deficit	−6 (70-69-69-70=278)	2 strokes	(South Korea) Ryu So-yeon, (United States) Lexi Thompson, (United States) Angel Yin

=== Results timeline ===
Results not in chronological order.

Tournament	2017	2018	2019	2020	2021	2022	2023	2024	2025	2026
Chevron Championship		T16	T6		T47	CUT	CUT	CUT	CUT	
U.S. Women's Open	T5	T17	1	T6	T12	T28	T27	T58	CUT	CUT
Women's PGA Championship		CUT	T30		T58	CUT	T47	CUT	CUT	
Evian Championship		T6	CUT	NT	2	CUT	CUT	T58		
Women's British Open			T9		T48	T22	T16			

Win
Top 10
Did not play

CUT = missed the half-way cut
NT = no tournament
T = tied

=== Summary ===
Tournament	Wins	2nd	3rd	Top-5	Top-10	Top-25	Events	Cuts made
Chevron Championship	0	0	0	0	1	2	6	2
U.S. Women's Open	1	0	0	2	3	5	10	8
Women's PGA Championship	0	0	0	0	0	0	7	3
The Evian Championship	0	1	0	1	2	2	6	3
Women's British Open	0	0	0	0	1	3	4	4
Totals	1	1	0	3	7	12	33	20

- Most consecutive cuts made – 7 (2019 British – 2021 British)
- Longest streak of top-10s – 3 (2018 Evian – 2019 U.S. Open)

== LPGA Tour career summary ==
Year	Tournaments played	Cuts made	Wins	2nd	3rd	Top 10s	Best finish	Earnings ($)	Money list rank	Scoring average	Scoring rank
2019	25	23	1	3	0	10	1	2,052,103	3	69.75	6
2020	5	4	0	0	0	1	T6	220,495	57	71.63	n/a
2021	24	22	0	1	0	8	2	1,081,440	13	70.29	21
2022	22	19	0	0	0	5	4	702,979	42	70.75	35
2023	23	15	0	0	0	1	T5	364,730	75	71.59	78
2024	20	10	0	0	0	0	T12	142,199	113	72.50	132
2025	19	6	0	0	0	0	T13	119,414	124	72.29	115

Official as of 2025 season

== World rank ==
Position in Women's World Golf Rankings at the end of each calendar year.

Year	World ranking	Source
2015	904	
2016	94	
2017	23	
2018	19	
2019	7	
2020	12	
2021	17	
2022	38	
2023	84	
2024	227	
2025	324	

== Team appearances ==
- The Queens (representing KLPGA): 2017 (winners)

== Awards ==
- 2019 LPGA Louise Suggs Rolex Rookie of the Year
