= 2019 LPGA Tour =

Professional women's golf tour

2019 LPGA Tour season
- Duration: January 17, 2019 – November 24, 2019
- Number of official events: 33
- Most wins: 4 (South Korea) Ko Jin-young
- Race to CME Globe Winner: (South Korea) Kim Sei-young
- Money leader: (South Korea) Ko Jin-young
- Vare Trophy: (South Korea) Ko Jin-young
- Rolex Player of the Year: (South Korea) Ko Jin-young
- Rookie of the Year: (South Korea) Lee Jeong-eun

The 2019 LPGA Tour was a series of professional golf tournaments for elite female golfers from around the world. The season began at the Four Season Golf Club in Lake Buena Vista, Florida on January 17 and ended on November 24 at the Tiburón Golf Club in Naples, Florida. The tournaments are sanctioned by the United States–based Ladies Professional Golf Association (LPGA).

== Schedule and results ==
The number in parentheses after each winners' name is the player's total number of wins in official money individual events on the LPGA Tour, including that event. Tournament and winner names in bold indicate LPGA majors.

Key

Major championships
Regular events
Team championships

Date	Tournament	Location	Winner	WWGR points	Purse ($)	Winner's share ($)
Jan 20	Diamond Resorts Tournament of Champions	Florida	(South Korea) Ji Eun-hee (5)	28	1,200,000	180,000
Feb 10	ISPS Handa Vic Open	Australia	(France) Céline Boutier (1)	20.5	1,100,000	165,000
Feb 17	ISPS Handa Women's Australian Open	Australia	(United States) Nelly Korda (2)	37	1,300,000	195,000
Feb 24	Honda LPGA Thailand	Thailand	(South Korea) Amy Yang (4)	62	1,600,000	240,000
Mar 3	HSBC Women's World Championship	Singapore	(South Korea) Park Sung-hyun (6)	62	1,500,000	225,000
Mar 24	Bank of Hope Founders Cup	Arizona	(South Korea) Ko Jin-young (3)	62	1,500,000	225,000
Mar 31	Kia Classic	California	(Japan) Nasa Hataoka (3)	62	1,800,000	270,000
Apr 7	**ANA Inspiration**	California	(South Korea) **Ko Jin-young** (4)	100	3,000,000	450,000
Apr 20	Lotte Championship	Hawaii	(Canada) Brooke Henderson (8)	56	2,000,000	300,000
Apr 28	Hugel-Air Premia LA Open	California	(Australia) Minjee Lee (5)	62	1,500,000	225,000
May 5	LPGA Mediheal Championship	California	(South Korea) Kim Sei-young (8)	56	1,800,000	270,000
May 26	Pure Silk Championship	Virginia	(England) Bronte Law (1)	56	1,300,000	195,000
Jun 2	**U.S. Women's Open**	South Carolina	(South Korea) **Lee Jeong-eun** (1)	100	5,500,000	1,000,000
Jun 9	ShopRite LPGA Classic	New Jersey	(United States) Lexi Thompson (11)	26	1,750,000	262,500
Jun 16	Meijer LPGA Classic	Michigan	(Canada) Brooke Henderson (9)	50	2,000,000	300,000
Jun 23	**KPMG Women's PGA Championship**	Minnesota	(Australia) **Hannah Green** (1)	100	3,850,000	577,500
Jun 30	Walmart NW Arkansas Championship	Arkansas	(South Korea) Park Sung-hyun (7)	62	2,000,000	300,000
Jul 7	Thornberry Creek LPGA Classic	Wisconsin	(China) Shanshan Feng (10)	31	2,000,000	300,000
Jul 14	Marathon Classic	Ohio	(South Korea) Kim Sei-young (9)	24	1,750,000	262,500
Jul 20	Dow Great Lakes Bay Invitational	Michigan	(United States) Cydney Clanton (1) (Thailand) Jasmine Suwannapura (2)	n/a	2,000,000	241,269 (each)
Jul 28	**Evian Championship**	France	(South Korea) **Ko Jin-young** (5)	100	4,100,000	615,000
Aug 4	**AIG Women's British Open**	England	(Japan) **Hinako Shibuno** (1)	100	4,500,000	675,000
Aug 11	Aberdeen Standard Investments Ladies Scottish Open	Scotland	(South Korea) M. J. Hur (3)	31	1,500,000	225,000
Aug 25	CP Women's Open	Ontario	(South Korea) Ko Jin-young (6)	62	2,250,000	337,500
Sep 1	Cambia Portland Classic	Oregon	(Australia) Hannah Green (2)	46	1,300,000	195,000
Sep 15	Solheim Cup	Scotland	Europe	n/a	n/a	n/a
Sep 29	Indy Women in Tech Championship	Indiana	(South Korea) M. J. Hur (4)	50	2,000,000	300,000
Oct 6	Volunteers of America Classic	Texas	(United States) Cheyenne Knight (1)	37	1,300,000	195,000
Oct 20	Buick LPGA Shanghai	China	(United States) Danielle Kang (3)	50	2,100,000	315,000
Oct 27	BMW Ladies Championship	South Korea	(South Korea) Jang Ha-na (5)	56	2,000,000	300,000
Nov 3	Taiwan Swinging Skirts LPGA	Taiwan	(United States) Nelly Korda (3)	50	2,200,000	330,000
Nov 10	Toto Japan Classic	Japan	(Japan) Ai Suzuki (1)	43	1,500,000	225,000
Nov 24	CME Group Tour Championship	Florida	(South Korea) Kim Sei-young (10)	62	5,000,000	1,500,000

== Statistical information ==
Key

Major championships
Regular events

=== Wins by player ===
Rank	Player	M	R	Total
1	Ko Jin-young (KOR)	2	2	4
2	Kim Sei-young (KOR)		3	3
T3	Hannah Green (AUS)	1	1	2
T3	Brooke Henderson (CAN)		2	2
T3	Nelly Korda (USA)		2	2
T3	Park Sung-hyun (KOR)		2	2
T3	M. J. Hur (KOR)		2	2
T8	Céline Boutier (FRA)		1	1
T8	Cydney Clanton (USA)		1	1
T8	Shanshan Feng (CHN)		1	1
T8	Nasa Hataoka (JPN)		1	1
T8	Jang Ha-na (KOR)		1	1
T8	Ji Eun-hee (KOR)		1	1
T8	Danielle Kang (USA)		1	1
T8	Cheyenne Knight (USA)		1	1
T8	Bronte Law (ENG)		1	1
T8	Lee Jeong-eun (KOR)	1		1
T8	Minjee Lee (AUS)		1	1
T8	Hinako Shibuno (JPN)	1		1
T8	Jasmine Suwannapura (THA)		1	1
T8	Ai Suzuki (JPN)		1	1
T8	Lexi Thompson (USA)		1	1
T8	Amy Yang (KOR)		1	1

=== Wins by nation ===
Rank	Nation	M	R	Total
1	South Korea (KOR)	3	12	15
2	United States (USA)		6	6
T3	Australia (AUS)	1	2	3
T3	Japan (JPN)	1	2	3
5	Canada (CAN)		2	2
T6	China (CHN)		1	1
T6	England (ENG)		1	1
T6	France (FRA)		1	1
T6	Thailand (THA)		1	1

== Points leaders ==
=== Rolex Player of the Year ===
Points distribution

Points were earned based on top-10 finishers, available points for regular events were as follows:

Place	1	2	3	4	5	6	7	8	9	10
Points	30	12	9	7	6	5	4	3	2	1

Points are doubled at each of the LPGA's five major championships.

Rank	Player	Country	Points
1	Ko Jin-young	South Korea	241
2	Nelly Korda	United States	126
3	Lee Jeong-eun	South Korea	123
4	Kim Sei-young	South Korea	122
5	Brooke Henderson	Canada	117
5	Park Sung-hyun	South Korea	117
7	Lexi Thompson	United States	109
8	Danielle Kang	United States	108
9	Hannah Green	Australia	92
9	Minjee Lee	Australia	92

Source and complete list: LPGA official website.

=== Race to CME Globe ===
Rank	Player	Country	Events	Season points
1	Ko Jin-young	South Korea	21	4,148
2	Brooke Henderson	Canada	26	2,907
3	Minjee Lee	Australia	25	2,870
4	Lee Jeong-eun	South Korea	24	2,743
5	Nelly Korda	United States	19	2,547
6	Park Sung-hyun	South Korea	19	2,494
7	Kim Sei-young	South Korea	24	2,340
8	Danielle Kang	United States	20	2,259
9	Lexi Thompson	United States	20	2,223
10	Kim Hyo-joo	South Korea	20	2,202

Source and complete list: LPGA official website.

=== Rolex First-Time Winners ===
Player	Country	Event	Score	Victory margin
Céline Boutier	France	ISPS Handa Vic Open	69-71-69-72=281 (−8)	2 strokes
Cydney Clanton	United States	Dow Great Lakes Bay Invitational (with Jasmine Suwannapura)	67-64-63-59=253 (−27)	6 strokes
Hannah Green	Australia	KPMG Women's PGA Championship	68-69-70-72=279 (−9)	1 stroke
Cheyenne Knight	United States	Volunteers of America Classic	66-67-67-66=266 (−18)	2 strokes
Bronte Law	England	Pure Silk Championship	65-68-67-67=267 (−17)	2 strokes
Lee Jeong-eun	South Korea	U.S. Women's Open	70-69-69-70=278 (−6)	2 strokes

== Statistics leaders ==
=== Money list leaders ===
Rank	Player	Events	Prize money ($)
1	(South Korea) Ko Jin-young	22	2,773,894
2	(South Korea) Kim Sei-young	25	2,753,099
3	(South Korea) Lee Jeong-eun	25	2,052,103
4	(Canada) Brooke Henderson	27	1,696,017
5	(United States) Nelly Korda	20	1,665,546
6	(United States) Lexi Thompson	21	1,537,292
7	(South Korea) Park Sung-hyun	20	1,529,905
8	(Australia) Minjee Lee	26	1,522,607
9	(United States) Danielle Kang	21	1,511,443
10	(South Korea) Kim Hyo-joo	21	1,290,734

Source and complete list: LPGA official website.

=== Scoring average ===
Rank	Player	Total strokes	Total rounds	Average
1	(South Korea) Ko Jin-young	5,594	81	69.062
2	(South Korea) Kim Hyo-joo	5,275	76	69.408
3	(Canada) Brooke Henderson	6,816	98	69.551
4	(United States) Nelly Korda	5,153	74	69.635
5	(South Korea) Park Sung-hyun	5,158	74	69.703
6	(South Korea) Lee Jeong-eun	6,556	94	69.745
7	(South Korea) M. J. Hur	6,004	86	69.814
8	(South Korea) Kim Sei-young	6,430	92	69.891
9	(Australia) Minjee Lee	6,641	95	69.905
10	(Spain) Carlota Ciganda	6,155	88	69.943

Source and complete list: LPGA official website.

== Awards ==
Award	Winner	Country
Rolex Player of the Year	Ko Jin-young	South Korea
Glenna Collett-Vare Trophy	Ko Jin-young	South Korea
Louise Suggs Rolex Rookie of the Year	Lee Jeong-eun	South Korea
Money winner	Ko Jin-young	South Korea
Rolex Annika Major Award	Ko Jin-young	South Korea
Race to the CME Globe	Kim Sei-young	South Korea

== See also ==
- 2019 Ladies European Tour
- 2019 Symetra Tour
