= Kim Hae-rym =

South Korean professional golfer

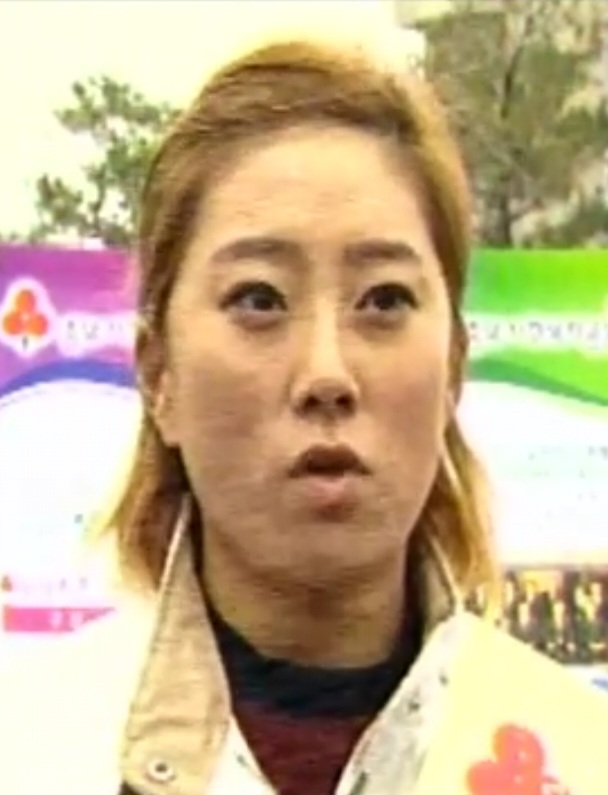
- Kim in 2015

Personal information
- Nationality: South Korea
- Born: 8 September 1989 (age 37) Seoul, South Korea
- Height: 5 ft 5 in (1.65 m)

Career
- Sport: Golf
- Turned professional: 2008
- Current tour: LPGA of Korea Tour
- Former tour: LPGA of Japan Tour
- Professional wins: 11

Number of wins by tour
- Ladies European Tour: 1
- LPGA of Japan Tour: 1
- LPGA of Korea Tour: 7
- WPGA Tour of Australasia: 1
- Other: 3

Achievements and awards
- KLPGA Dream Tour Order of Merit: 2011
- KLPGA Rookie of the Year: 2012

Kim Hae-rym (born 8 September 1989), also known as Hae Rym Kim, is a South Korean professional golfer who plays on the LPGA of Korea Tour, with seven career KLPGA wins. In 2017, she claimed titles in China, Korea, and Japan, and climbed to number 30 in the Women's World Golf Rankings.

== Career ==
Kim turned professional in 2008 and joined the KLPGA Dream Tour, graduating to the main KLPGA in 2009. In 2011, she was relegated back to the Dream Tour, where she recorded 13 total top-10s including three wins, to easily win the tour's money list. In 2013, she finished 25th on the KLPGA money list, and in 2014 17th, with best finish a runner-up at the Cheju Samdasoo Masters.

2015 was Kim's breakthrough season, she finished 9th on the money list with ₩417 million in earnings. She did not manage to secure a win, but recorded 12 top-10 finishes and came close to winning several times. She was runner-up in back-to-back events, at the Pak Se Ri Invitational where she had the second round lead but lost by a shot to Park Sung-hyun, and at the KB Financial Star Championship, a KLPGA major, where she had a two shot lead after three rounds but lost to Chun In-gee after a bogey on the final hole.

2016 was another good season. Kim won the Kyochon Honey Ladies Open in May and the year's last major, the KB Financial Star Championship, to finish sixth on the money list with ₩618 million. Kim started her 2017 season by winning the World Ladies Championship in Haikou, China, an event co-sanctioned by the Ladies European Tour, China LPGA Tour, and the KLPGA, in a two-hole playoff against fellow South Korean Bae Seon-woo. She also finished T16 in the Lotte Championship in Hawaii on the LPGA Tour.

2017 was her best season. She won three KLPGA tournaments, including defending her title at the KB Financial Star Championship, and finished 5th on the money list with 738 million in earnings. In May, she reached a career high rank of 30 on the Women's World Golf Rankings.

Kim represented the KLPGA at The Queens in 2016 and 2017. In 2016, she teamed with Lee Sung-hyun to beat Aussies Su-Hyun Oh and Sarah Jane Smith, 4 and 3. She also won her singles match against Megumi Shinokawa of Japan, 3 and 2. In 2017, she won both her team match and singles match to help the KLPGA team finish runner-up.

Kim turned her back on the 2017 U.S. Women's Open and instead accepted an invitation to play the Samantha Thavasa Girls Collection Ladies Tournament in Japan, an event she won. Following her win, Kim played on the LPGA of Japan Tour, starting five events in 2017 and 19 in 2018. Her next best finish was 5th at the 2017 Japan Women's Open Golf Championship. In 2018, she finished 59th on their money list with less than ¥20 million earned.

In 2018, she won one KLPGA event, the Kyochon Honey Chicken Ladies Open, and finished 42nd on the money list. In 2019, she had a mediocre season, finishing 61st on the money list, and same with the COVID-shortened 2020 season, where she finished 38th on the money list with best finish a 7th at the Korea Women's Open. In 2021, she secured her 7th KLPGA victory at the McCol Mona Park Open in July.

== Personal life ==
Kim has vowed to donate 10% of her winnings to charity, and has done so each year since turning pro.

== Professional wins (11) ==
=== LPGA of Korea Tour wins (7) ===
- 2016 KyoChon Honey Ladies Open, KB Financial Star Championship
- 2017 World Ladies Championship,^{1} KyoChon Honey Ladies Open, KB Financial Star Championship
- 2018 KyoChon Honey Ladies Open
- 2021 McCol Mona Park Open

^{1} Co-sanctioned with CLPGA Tour and Ladies European Tour

=== LPGA of Japan Tour wins (1) ===
- 2017 Samantha Thavasa Girls Collection Ladies Tournament

=== LPGA of China Tour wins (1) ===
- 2017 World Ladies Championship^{1}

^{1} Co-sanctioned with KLPGA Tour and Ladies European Tour

=== Ladies European Tour wins (1) ===
- 2017 World Ladies Championship^{1}

^{1} Co-sanctioned with KLPGA Tour and CLPGA Tour

=== Dream Tour wins (3) ===
- 2011 Volvik Dream Tour 2nd Tournament, Pacomeri Dream Tour 8th Tournament, Pacomeri Dream Tour 9th Tournament

== Team appearances ==
Professional

- The Queens (representing Korea): 2016 (winners), 2017
