= BMW Ladies Championship =

Coordinates: 35.288°N 129.242°E

Tournament information
- Location: South Jeolla Province, South Korea (2025)
- Established: 2019
- Course: Pine Beach Golf Links (2025)
- Par: 72
- Length: 6,785 yards (6,204 m)
- Tours: LPGA Tour; LPGA of Korea Tour
- Format: Stroke play - 72 holes, no cut
- Prize fund: $2.3 million
- Month played: October

Tournament record score
- Aggregate: 264 Kim Sei-young (2025)
- To par: −24 as above

Current champion
- (South Korea) Kim Sei-young

The BMW Ladies Championship is a women's professional golf tournament in Wonju, South Korea, co-sanctioned by the LPGA of Korea Tour and the LPGA Tour. It debuted in 2019. It replaced the LPGA KEB Hana Bank Championship as the LPGA Tour's Korean stop on its Asian swing.

It is a 72-hole event with a limited field of 84 players, approximately half of a full-field event. There is no cut; all players play all four rounds

Jang Ha-na won the inaugural event in a playoff over Danielle Kang.

An LPGA of Korea Tour event of the same name was played from 2015 to 2017 at the Sky 72 Golf Club, home of the LPGA KEB Hana Bank Championship.

Lydia Ko won in 2022, at Wonju, approximately 140 kilometres (87 mi) east of Seoul, her birthplace, for her 18th LPGA Tour victory.

== Winners ==
Year	Tour(s)	Date	Champion	Country	Score	To par	Purse ($)	Winner's share ($)
2025	LPGA	19 Oct	Kim Sei-young	South Korea	264	−24	2,300,000	345,000
2024	LPGA	20 Oct	Hannah Green	Australia	269	−19	2,200,000	330,000
2023	LPGA	22 Oct	Minjee Lee	Australia	272	−16	2,200,000	330,000
2022	LPGA	23 Oct	Lydia Ko	New Zealand	267	−21	2,000,000	300,000
2021	LPGA, KLPGA	24 Oct	Ko Jin-young	South Korea	266	−22	2,000,000	300,000
2020	Canceled due to COVID-19 pandemic							
2019	LPGA, KLPGA	27 Oct	Jang Ha-na	South Korea	269	−19	2,000,000	300,000
Year	Tour(s)	Date	Champion	Country	Score	To par	Purse (₩)	Winner's share (₩)
2018	No tournament							
2017	KLPGA	17 Sep	Ko Jin-young	South Korea	272	−12	1,200,000,000	300,000,000
2016	KLPGA	17 Jul	Ko Jin-young	South Korea	275	−13	1,200,000,000	300,000,000
2015	KLPGA	19 Jul	Cho Yoon-ji	South Korea	270	−18	1,200,000,000	300,000,000

== Tournament record ==
As LPGA Tour event

Year	Player	Score	Round
2022	Atthaya Thitikul	63 (−9)	1st
2024	Sung Yu-jin	63 (−9)	3rd
