= Park Sung-hyun (golfer) =

South Korean golfer (born 1993)

Park Sung-hyun 박성현
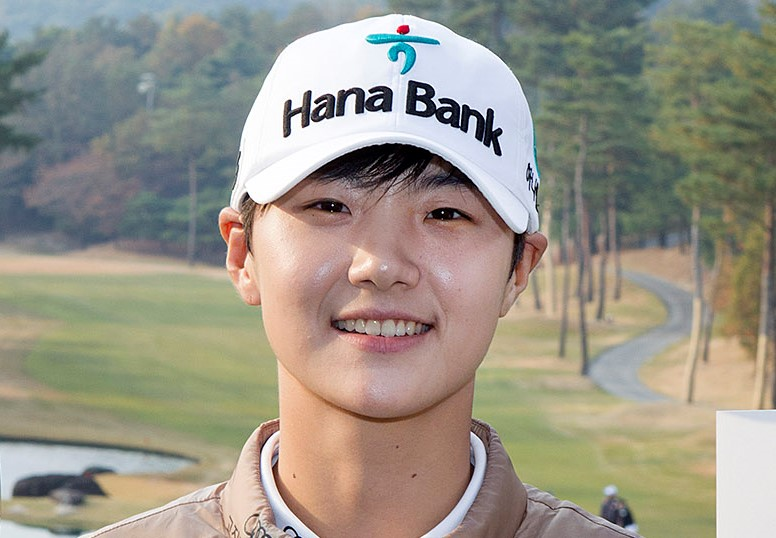

Personal information
- Nationality: South Korea
- Born: 21 September 1993 (age 33) Seoul, South Korea
- Height: 1.72 m (5 ft 8 in)

Career
- Sport: Golf
- Turned professional: 2012
- Current tours: KLPGA Tour (joined 2014); LPGA Tour (joined 2017)
- Professional wins: 18

Number of wins by tour
- LPGA Tour: 7
- LPGA of Korea Tour: 10
- Other: 1

Best results in LPGA major championships (wins: 2)
- Chevron Championship: T6: 2016
- Women's PGA C'ship: Won: 2018
- U.S. Women's Open: Won: 2017
- Women's British Open: 8th: 2019
- Evian Championship: T2: 2016

Achievements and awards
- LPGA of Korea Tour leading money winner: 2016
- LPGA Rookie of the Year: 2017
- LPGA Player of the Year: 2017
- Best Female Golfer ESPY Award: 2018

- Park Sung-hyun
- Hangul: 박성현
- Hanja: 朴城炫
- RR: Bak Seonghyeon
- MR: Pak Sŏnghyŏn

Park Sung-hyun (born 21 September 1993), also known as Sung Hyun Park, is a South Korean professional golfer playing on the U.S.-based LPGA Tour. She has won two LPGA majors championships, the 2017 U.S. Women's Open and the 2018 Women's PGA Championship. She was the number one ranked golfer in the Women's World Golf Rankings for a single week in 2017 and has returned to the number one spot in 2018 and 2019.

== Professional career ==
From 2014 to 2016 Park played on the LPGA of Korea Tour. She won four times in 2015 and six times in 2016.

Since 2017 Park has played on the LPGA Tour. In July 2017, she won the U.S. Women's Open, an LPGA major. In November 2017, she became the number one ranked golfer in the Women's World Golf Rankings. Park clinched the LPGA's Rookie of the Year Award in the penultimate month of the 2017 season. Park then went on to share Player of the Year honors with Ryu So-yeon, making Park the first player since Nancy Lopez in 1978 to win both Player and Rookie of the Year honors in the same season.

Park won three times in 2018, this included a major title in July 2018 at the KPMG Women's PGA Championship. After holding the top ranking for only one week in 2017, she regained the number one spot with her win at the Indy Women in Tech Championship in August 2018. She ended the 2018 season third on the LPGA money list and ranked second in the world to Ariya Jutanugarn.

In 2019, Park won the HSBC Women's World Championship and the Walmart NW Arkansas Championship.

== Professional wins (18) ==
=== LPGA Tour wins (7) ===
Legend
Major championships (2)
Other LPGA Tour (5)

No.	Date	Tournament	Winning score	To par	Margin of victory	Runner(s)-up	Winner's share ($)
1	16 Jul 2017	U.S. Women's Open	73-70-67-67=277	−11	2 strokes	(South Korea) Choi Hye-jin (a)	900,000
2	27 Aug 2017	Canadian Pacific Women's Open	70-68-69-64=271	−13	2 strokes	(South Korea) Mirim Lee	337,500
3	6 May 2018	Volunteers of America LPGA Texas Classic	65-66=131	−11	1 stroke	(United States) Lindy Duncan	195,000
4	1 Jul 2018	KPMG Women's PGA Championship	66-72-71-69=278	−10	Playoff	(Japan) Nasa Hataoka (South Korea) Ryu So-yeon	547,500
5	19 Aug 2018	Indy Women in Tech Championship	68-63-66-68=265	−23	Playoff	(United States) Lizette Salas	300,000
6	3 Mar 2019	HSBC Women's World Championship	69-71-69-64=273	−15	2 strokes	(Australia) Minjee Lee	225,000
7	30 Jun 2019	Walmart NW Arkansas Championship	66-63-66=195	−18	1 stroke	(United States) Danielle Kang (South Korea) Kim Hyo-joo (South Korea) Inbee Park	300,000

LPGA Tour playoff record (2–0)

No.	Year	Tournament	Opponent(s)	Result
1	2018	KPMG Women's PGA Championship	(Japan) Nasa Hataoka (South Korea) Ryu So-yeon	Won with birdie on second extra hole Hataoka eliminated by par on first hole
2	2018	Indy Women in Tech Championship	(United States) Lizette Salas	Won with birdie on first extra hole

=== LPGA of Korea Tour wins (10) ===
No.	Date	Tournament	Winning score	To par	Margin of victory	Runner(s)-up
1	21 Jun 2015	Kia Motors Korea Women's Open	73-69-70-77=289	+1	2 strokes	(South Korea) Lee Jung-min
2	20 Sep 2015	KDB Daewoo Securities Classic	68-66-69=203	−13	2 strokes	(South Korea) Ahn Song-yi (South Korea) Kim Hye-youn (South Korea) Seong Eun-jeong (a)
3	4 Oct 2015	OK! Savings Bank Pak Se-ri Invitational	71-67-68=206	−10	1 stroke	(South Korea) Kim Hae-rym (South Korea) Kim Ji-hyun
4	14 Dec 2015	Hyundai China Ladies Open	64-68-67=199	−17	2 strokes	(South Korea) Kim Hyo-joo
5	17 Apr 2016	Samchully Together Open	65-73-74=212	−4	Playoff	(South Korea) Kim Ji-yeong
6	24 Apr 2016	Nexen-Saintnine Masters	72-64-72=208	−8	1 stroke	(South Korea) Cho Jeong-min (South Korea) Kim Min-sun
7	22 May 2016	Doosan Match Play Championship	19 holes			(South Korea) Kim Ji-hyun
8	7 Aug 2016	Jeju Samdasoo Masters	65-67-66=198	−18	9 strokes	(South Korea) Pak Ju-young
9	21 Aug 2016	Bogner-MBN Ladies Open	64-65-70=199	−17	4 strokes	(South Korea) Lee Mi-hyang
10	4 Sep 2016	Hanwha Finance Classic	74-67-74-67=282	−6	1 stroke	(South Korea) Ko Jin-young

=== Taiwan LPGA Tour wins (1) ===
- 2019 The Country Club Ladies Invitational

== Major championships ==
=== Wins (2) ===
Year	Championship	54 holes	Winning score	Margin	Runner(s)-up
2017	U.S. Women's Open	3 shot deficit	−11 (73-70-67-67=277)	2 strokes	(South Korea) Choi Hye-jin (a)
2018	Women's PGA Championship	4 shot deficit	−10 (66-72-71-69=278)	Playoff	(Japan) Nasa Hataoka, (South Korea) Ryu So-yeon

=== Results timeline ===
Results not in chronological order.

Tournament	2016	2017	2018	2019	2020	2021	2022	2023	2024	2025	2026
Chevron Championship	T6	T14	T9	T52	T40	CUT	CUT	CUT			
U.S. Women's Open	T3	1	CUT	T12	CUT	CUT	T28	CUT		CUT	CUT
Women's PGA Championship		T14	1	2	17	CUT	T62	T77		CUT	T42
The Evian Championship	T2	T26	CUT	T6	NT	CUT	CUT	T61			
Women's British Open	T50	T16	T15	8		CUT	T28				

Win
Top 10
Did not play

CUT = missed the half-way cut
NT = no tournament
T = tied

=== Summary ===
Tournament	Wins	2nd	3rd	Top-5	Top-10	Top-25	Events	Cuts made
Chevron Championship	0	0	0	0	2	3	8	5
U.S. Women's Open	1	0	1	2	2	3	10	4
Women's PGA Championship	1	1	0	2	2	4	9	7
The Evian Championship	0	1	0	1	2	2	7	4
Women's British Open	0	0	0	0	1	3	6	5
Totals	2	2	1	5	9	15	40	25

- Most consecutive cuts made – 10 (2016 ANA – 2018 ANA)
- Longest streak of top 10s – 3 (2019 Women's PGA – 2019 British Open)

== LPGA Tour career summary ==
Year	Tournaments played	Cuts made	Wins	2nd	3rd	Top 10s	Best finish	Earnings ($)	Money list rank	Scoring average	Scoring rank
2015	1	1	0	1	0	1	T2	n/a	n/a	68.50	n/a
2016	7	7	0	1	1	4	T2	n/a	n/a	69.75	n/a
2017	23	23	2	2	2	11	1	2,335,883	1	69.25	2
2018	24	17	3	0	1	7	1	1,498,077	3	70.65	23
2019	20	17	2	2	0	7	1	1,529,905	7	69.70	5
2020	7	5	0	0	0	0	17	96,187	88	71.83	56
2021	19	9	0	0	0	0	T15	69,353	123	72.41	118
2022	18	10	0	0	0	0	T15	199,659	96	72.27	119
2023	17	9	0	0	0	0	T16	69,388	143	73.12	147
2024	Did not play										
2025	17	7	0	0	0	1	T7	101,842	131	72.47	120

- official as of 2025 season

== Team appearances ==
Professional

- The Queens (representing Korea): 2015 (winners)
- International Crown (representing South Korea): 2018 (winners)
