= World Ladies Championship =

Golf tournament

Coordinates: 19.905°N 110.311°E

Tournament information
- Location: Shenzhen, China
- Established: 2012
- Courses: Mission Hills Haikou, Blackstone course
- Tours: Ladies European Tour; LPGA of Korea Tour; China LPGA Tour
- Format: Stroke play
- Prize fund: ₩700,000,000
- Month played: March
- Final year: 2017

Tournament record score
- Aggregate: 268 Inbee Park (2014)
- To par: −24 as above

Final champion
- (South Korea) Kim Hae-rym

Location in China

The World Ladies Championship was a golf tournament on the Ladies European Tour. It was played at the Mission Hills Haikou, China from 2012 to 2015. It moved to the Mission Hills Golf Club in Shenzhen in 2016 and returned to Haikou in 2017. It was played as both an individual and team tournament. Only the individual event was an official money/official win event.

Tournament names through the years:

- 2012: World Ladies Championship
- 2013–2014: Mission Hills World Ladies Championship
- 2015–2016: World Ladies Championship
- 2017: SGF67 World Ladies Championship with SBS

== Winners ==
Year	Course	Individual winner	Team winner
2017	Blackstone	(South Korea) Kim Hae-rym	none
2016	Olazabal	(South Korea) Lee Jung-min	(South Korea) Lee Jung-min & Ko Jin-young
2015	Blackstone	(South Korea) Ryu So-yeon	(South Korea) Inbee Park & Ryu So-yeon
2014	Blackstone	(South Korea) Inbee Park	(South Korea) Inbee Park & Ryu So-yeon
2013	Sandbelt Trails	(Norway) Suzann Pettersen	(South Korea) Inbee Park & Kim Ha-neul
2012	Vintage	(China) Shanshan Feng	(China) Shanshan Feng & Liying Ye
