= The Queens (golf) =

Coordinates: 35.5°N 137.4°E

Tournament information
- Location: Miyoshi, Aichi, Japan
- Established: 2015
- Course(s): Miyoshi Country Club
- Par: 72
- Tour(s): LPGA of Japan Tour; ALPG Tour; LPGA of Korea Tour; Ladies European Tour
- Format: Match play
- Prize fund: €750,000
- Month played: December
- Final year: 2017

Final champion
- LPGA of Japan

Location in Japan

The Queens Presented by Kowa was a women's professional team golf tournament held in Japan. The tournament was contested by teams representing the tours of Japan, Korea, Australia and Europe. Hosts Japan led from start to finish to win the inaugural tournament 4–6 December 2015.

== Format ==
The cup was played over three days with four teams of nine players each.

In 2015, there were 34 matches – eight four-balls day one, eight foursomes day two, and 18 singles on the final day. Three points were awarded for each win and one point for halved matches. This is a similar format to the Solheim Cup. The winner was based on cumulative score over all three days.

In 2016, the format changed in two ways. Two points were awarded for each win and one point for halved matches. Based on the score from the first two days (foursomes and four-balls), the leading two teams faced off on the third day in singles matches for the championship and the third and fourth place team played for third place.

In 2017, the format changed again. On the first day eight four-ball matches were played and on the second day nine singles matches were played. Based on the score from the first two days, the leading two teams faced off in foursomes on the third day for the championship and the third and fourth place team played for third place.

== Winners ==
Year	Winner	Runner-up	Third place	Fourth place
2017	Japan	(South Korea) Korea	Australia	Europe
2016	(South Korea) Korea	Japan	Europe	Australia
2015	Japan	(South Korea) Korea	Europe	Australia

== Results ==
=== 2015 ===
After the final round at Miyoshi Country Club in 2015, the Japanese team ended with 41 points, just three ahead of the Koreans, who won eight of their nine singles matches. The LET team finished third with the ALPG in fourth.

Tour	4-balls	4-somes	Singles	Total
JLPGA	12	10	19	41
KLPGA	7	7	24	38
LET	4	4	4	12
ALPG	0	1	6	7

=== 2016 ===
After the first two rounds, Korea led with 12 points to Japan's 11 and they faced-off in the Championship singles on the final day. Europe, third with 7 points, faced Australia, with 2 points in the third-place match. Korea won seven of the eight singles matches and halved the other to win the Queens 15–1. Europe took third place with a 9–7 win over Australia.

Tour	4-somes	4-balls	Total
KLPGA	4	8	12
JLPGA	8	3	11
LET	4	3	7
ALPG	0	2	2

=== 2017 ===
After the first two rounds, Korea led with 24 points to Japan's 12 and they faced-off in the Championship foursomes on the final day. Australia, third with 9 points, faced Europe, with 7 points, in the third-place match. Japan won three of the four foursomes matches and halved the other to win the Queens 7–1. Australia took third place with a 5–3 win over Europe.

Tour	4-balls	Singles	Total
KLPGA	8	16	24
JLPGA	5	7	12
ALPG	1	8	9
LET	2	5	7

== Teams ==
Year	Japan	Korea	Europe	Australia
2015	Momoko Ueda (C); Erina Hara; Akane Iijima; Erika Kikuchi; Misuzu Narita; Shiho Oyama; Ritsuko Ryu; Miki Sakai; Ayaka Watanabe	Lee Bo-mee (C); Bae Seon-woo; Cho Yoon-ji; Chun In-gee; Kim Min-sun; Kim Sei-young; Ko Jin-young; Lee Jung-min; Park Sung-hyun	Laura Davies (C); Hannah Burke; Karine Icher; Nanna Koerstz Madsen; Catriona Matthew; Gwladys Nocera; Emily Kristine Pedersen; Melissa Reid; Marianne Skarpnord	Rachel Hetherington (C); Nikki Campbell; Nikki Garrett; Whitney Hillier; Sarah Kemp; Katherine Kirk; Stephanie Na; Sarah Jane Smith; Lindsey Wright
2016	Ritsuko Ryu (C); Kotone Hori; Erika Kikuchi; Yukari Nishiyama; Shiho Oyama; Megumi Shimokawa; Ai Suzuki; Ayaka Watanabe; Yumiko Yoshida	Jiyai Shin (C); Bae Seon-woo; Cho Jeong-min; Jang Su-yeon; Jung Hee-won; Kim Hae-rym; Kim Min-sun; Ko Jin-young; Lee Seung-hyun	Trish Johnson (C); Isabelle Boineau; Georgia Hall; Nuria Iturrioz; Nanna Koerstz Madsen; Catriona Matthew; Becky Morgan; Florentyna Parker; Linda Wessberg	Rachel Hetherington (C); Cathryn Bristow; Lauren Hibbert; Whitney Hillier; Stacey Keating; Sarah Kemp; Katherine Kirk; Su-Hyun Oh; Sarah Jane Smith
2017	Misuzu Narita (C); Lala Anai; Mamiko Higa; Kotone Hori; Fumika Kawagishi; Yukari Nishiyama; Ritsuko Ryu; Ai Suzuki; Momoko Ueda	Kim Ha-neul (C); Bae Seon-woo; Kim Char-young; Kim Hae-rym; Kim Ji-hyun; Kim Ji-hyun2; Ko Jin-young; Lee Jeong-eun; Oh Ji-hyun	Gwladys Nocera (C); Carly Booth; Holly Clyburn; Annabel Dimmock; Felicity Johnson; Ólafia Kristinsdóttir; Lee-Anne Pace; Florentyna Parker; Melissa Reid	Karrie Webb (C); Cathryn Bristow; Hannah Green; Rachel Hetherington; Whitney Hillier; Sarah Kemp; Katherine Kirk; Stacey Peters; Sarah Jane Smith
