= Ryu So-yeon =

South Korean professional golfer (born 1990)

Ryu So-yeon 유소연
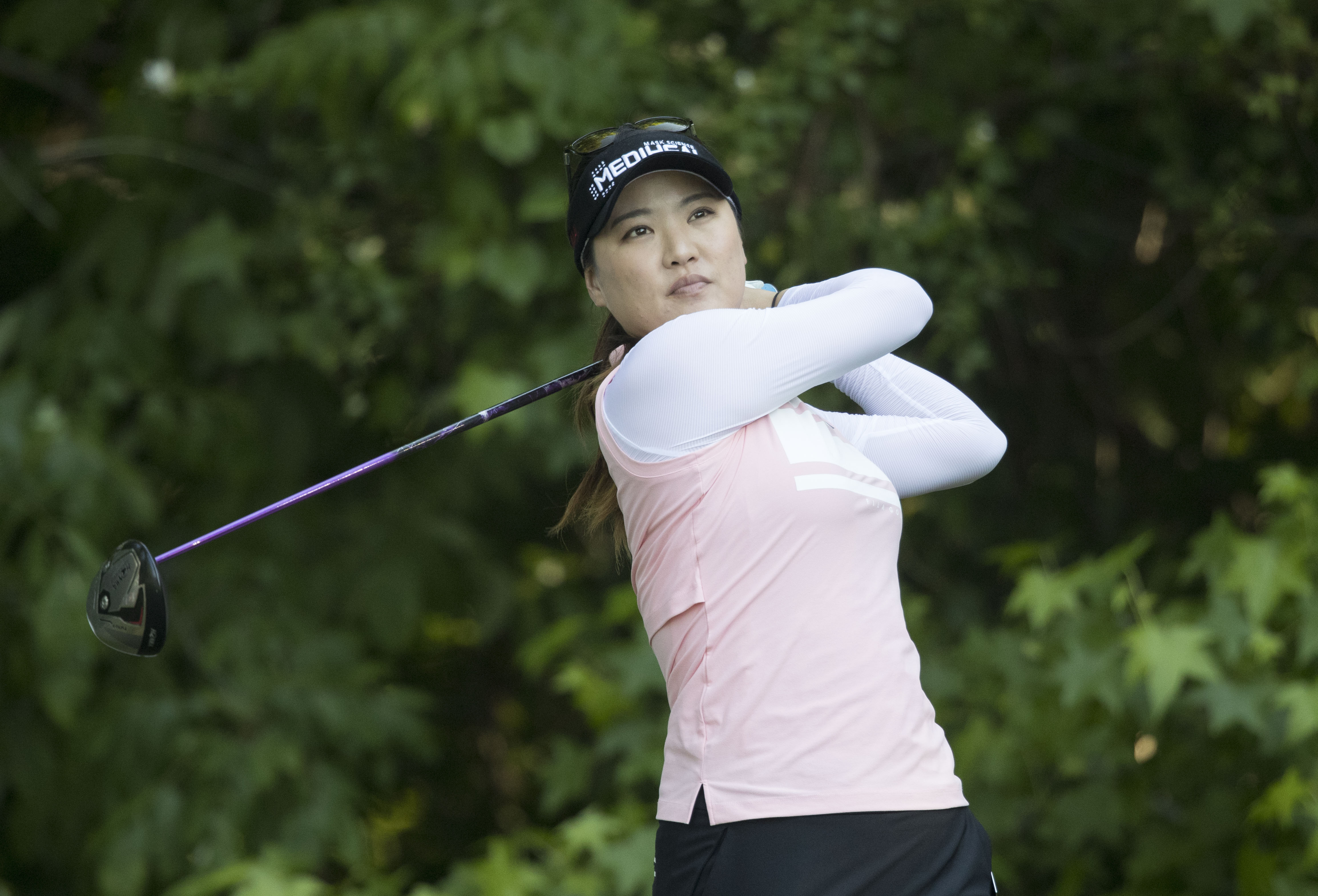
- Ryu in 2017

Personal information
- Nationality: South Korea
- Born: 29 June 1990 (age 36) Seoul, South Korea
- Height: 1.68 m (5 ft 6 in)

Career
- Sport: Golf
- College: Yonsei University (did not play college golf)
- Turned professional: 2007
- Former tours: LPGA Tour; LPGA of Korea Tour
- Professional wins: 21

Number of wins by tour
- LPGA Tour: 6
- Ladies European Tour: 1
- LPGA of Japan Tour: 1
- LPGA of Korea Tour: 10
- Other: 3

Best results in LPGA major championships (wins: 2)
- Chevron Championship: Won: 2017
- Women's PGA C'ship: T2: 2018
- U.S. Women's Open: Won: 2011
- Women's British Open: 3rd/T3: 2015, 2018
- Evian Championship: T2: 2016

Achievements and awards
- LPGA Rookie of the Year: 2012
- Rolex Annika Major Award: 2017
- LPGA Player of the Year: 2017
Medal record
Asian Games
Gold medal – first place	2006 Doha	Individual
Gold medal – first place	2006 Doha	Women's team

Ryu So-yeon (Korean: 유소연; pronounced [ju sojʌn]; born 29 June 1990), also known as So Yeon Ryu, is a South Korean professional golfer who played on the LPGA Tour and on the LPGA of Korea Tour.

She is a two-time major winner having won the 2011 U.S. Women's Open and the 2017 ANA Inspiration.

On 26 June 2017, she became only the 11th No. 1 ranked golfer in the Rolex Rankings by virtue of winning her 5th LPGA Tour title at the Walmart NW Arkansas Championship.

== Professional career ==
=== LPGA of Korea ===
In 2007, at the age of 17, Ryu turned professional. Her first win as a professional came in February 2008 on the American Cactus Tour, in which she won by six strokes. She then joined the LPGA of Korea, winning the first event she played, the Sports Seoul Open.

On 11 July 2011, Ryu won the U.S. Women's Open. On the 18th hole of the final round, the toughest hole for the tournament, she trailed the clubhouse leader Hee Kyung Seo by one stroke, but hit her approach to 6 feet and made the birdie putt to force a playoff. Ryu won the three-hole playoff with a birdie on the last hole.

During this era, Ryu also took classes at Yonsei University while also competing full-time on the LPGA Tour. She graduated in February 2013 with a degree in sports business.

=== LPGA Tour ===
Ryu picked up her second career LPGA Tour win in 2012 at the Jamie Farr Toledo Classic. With one tournament still to play in the season, Ryu had a big enough lead in the LPGA Rookie of the Year points standings to clinch the award for the season.

On 23 June 2013, Ryu lost in a sudden-death playoff at the Walmart NW Arkansas Championship to fellow South Korean Inbee Park. Park made birdie on the first extra hole to take the victory after Ryu could only make par.

On 2 April 2017, Ryu won her second major championship at the ANA Inspiration with a sudden-death playoff victory over Lexi Thompson. The tournament was controversial though, after leader Thompson was handed a retrospective four stroke penalty midway through the final round, for an infringement reported by a TV viewer during the third round. Thompson was found to have incorrectly marked and replaced her ball on the 17th hole during the third round. At the time, Thompson had a two stroke advantage. Ryu went on to win with a birdie on the first extra hole of the playoff.

On 25 June 2017, Ryu won the Walmart NW Arkansas Championship and became the number one golfer in the Women's World Golf Rankings.

In March 2024, Ryu announced her intention to retire after the 2024 Chevron Championship.

== Awards and honors ==
- In 2012, Ryu earned LPGA Rookie of the Year honors.
- In 2017, she won the Rolex Annika Major Award.
- In 2017, Ryu won the LPGA Player of the Year.

== Professional wins (20) ==
=== LPGA Tour wins (6) ===
Legend
Major championships (2)
Other LPGA Tour (4)

No.	Date	Tournament	Winning score	To par	Margin of victory	Runner(s)-up	Winner's share ($)
1	11 Jul 2011	U.S. Women's Open	74-69-69-69=281	−3	Playoff	(South Korea) Hee-kyung Seo	585,000
2	12 Aug 2012	Jamie Farr Toledo Classic	67-68-67-62=264	−20	7 strokes	(United States) Angela Stanford	195,000
3	24 Aug 2014	Canadian Pacific Women's Open	63-66-67-69=265	−23	2 strokes	(South Korea) Choi Na-yeon	337,000
4	2 Apr 2017	ANA Inspiration	68-69-69-68=274	−14	Playoff	(United States) Lexi Thompson	405,000
5	25 Jun 2017	Walmart NW Arkansas Championship	65-61-69=195	−18	2 strokes	(Thailand) Moriya Jutanugarn (South Korea) Amy Yang	300,000
6	17 Jun 2018	Meijer LPGA Classic	64-67-69-67=267	−21	2 strokes	(Germany) Caroline Masson	300,000

LPGA Tour playoff record (2–4)

No.	Year	Tournament	Opponent(s)	Result
1	2011	U.S. Women's Open	(South Korea) Hee-kyung Seo	Won three hole aggregate playoff: Ryu: 3-4-3=10 (−2), Seo: 3-6-4=13 (+1)
2	2012	Women's Australian Open	(Paraguay) Julieta Granada (United States) Jessica Korda (United States) Stacy Lewis (United States) Brittany Lincicome (South Korea) Hee-kyung Seo	Korda won with birdie on second extra hole
3	2013	Walmart NW Arkansas Championship	(South Korea) Inbee Park	Lost to birdie on first extra hole
4	2017	ANA Inspiration	(United States) Lexi Thompson	Won with birdie on first extra hole
5	2018	KPMG Women's PGA Championship	(Japan) Nasa Hataoka (South Korea) Park Sung-hyun	Park won with birdie on second extra hole. Hataoka eliminated by par on first hole.
6	2020	ISPS Handa Vic Open	(South Korea) Choi Hye-jin (South Korea) Park Hee-young	Park won with par on fourth extra hole. Ryu eliminated by birdie on second hole.

=== LPGA of Korea Tour wins (10) ===
No.	Date	Tournament	Winning score	Margin of victory	Runner-up
1	13 Apr 2008	Sports Seoul-KYJ Golf Open	−5 (68-70-73=211)	4 strokes	(South Korea) Hye-yong Choi
2	25 May 2009	Doosan Match Play Championship	27 holes		(South Korea) Hye-yong Choi
3	7 Jun 2009	Woori Investment & Securities Ladies Championship	−12 (70-66-68=204)	4 strokes	(South Korea) Soo-jin Yang
4	19 Jun 2009	MBC Tour S-Oil Champions Invitational	−6 (69-69-72=210)	1 stroke	(South Korea) Hye-jung Kim
5	16 Aug 2009	SBS Charity Women’s Open	−10 (69-70-67=206)	1 stroke	(South Korea) Chung Il-mi
6	19 Dec 2009	Orient China Ladies Open	−10 (70-71-70=211)	Playoff	(South Korea) Seo Hee-kyung
7	11 Jun 2011	SBS Tour Lotte Cantata Ladies Open	−14 (69-69-74=212)	1 stroke	(South Korea) Hye-youn Kim
8	9 Sep 2012	Hanwha Finance Classic	−9 (70-70-71-68=279)	1 stroke	(South Korea) Heo Yoon-kyung
9	30 Aug 2015	High1 Resort Ladies Open	−11 (71-67-69-70=277)	2 strokes	(South Korea) Jang Ha-na
10	21 Jun 2020	Kia Motors Korea Women's Open Championship	−12 (66-67-71-72=276)	1 stroke	(South Korea) Kim Hyo-joo

=== LPGA of Japan Tour wins (1) ===
No.	Date	Tournament	Winning score	To par	Margin of victory	Runner-up
1	30 Sep 2018	Japan Women's Open Golf Championship	65-72-69-67=273	−15	3 strokes	(Japan) Nasa Hataoka

=== Ladies European Tour wins (1) ===
No.	Date	Tournament	Winning score	To par	Margin of victory	Runner-up
1	15 Mar 2015	World Ladies Championship (individual)	72-73-65-69=279	−13	1 stroke	(South Korea) Inbee Park

=== Cactus Tour wins (1) ===
No.	Date	Tournament	Winning score	Margin of victory	Runner(s)-up
1	6 Feb 2008	Event #3 at Wigwam Red	−8 (70-70-68=208)	6 strokes	(United States) Marcy Hart

=== Other wins (2) ===
- 2014 Mission Hills World Ladies Championship - team (with Inbee Park)
- 2015 World Ladies Championship - team (with Inbee Park)

== Major championships ==
=== Wins (2) ===
Year	Championship	54 holes	Winning score	Margin	Runner-up
2011	U.S. Women's Open	Tied for lead	−3 (74-69-69-69=281)	Playoff^{1}	(South Korea) Seo Hee-kyung
2017	ANA Inspiration	3-shot deficit	−14 (68-69-69-68=274)	Playoff^{2}	(United States) Lexi Thompson

^{1} Defeated Seo Hee-kyung in a three-hole playoff: Ryu (3-4-3=10) and Seo (3-6-4=13)
^{2} Defeated Lexi Thompson in a sudden death playoff with birdie on first extra hole

=== Results timeline ===
Results not in chronological order.

Tournament	2010	2011	2012	2013	2014	2015	2016	2017	2018	2019
Chevron Championship	T64	T41	T56	2	T46	T20	T10	1	T48	T39
Women's PGA Championship			T25	CUT	T13	T13	T4	T14	T2	T10
U.S. Women's Open	T25	1	T14	3	T5	T5	T11	T3	23	T2
The Evian Championship ^				T4	DQ	T46	T2	T40	T10	T25
Women's British Open			T5	T17	T17	T3	T8	T43	3	CUT

Tournament	2020	2021	2022	2023	2024
Chevron Championship		T50	T71	CUT	CUT
U.S. Women's Open	T20	22	CUT	T53	
Women's PGA Championship		T33	49		
The Evian Championship ^	NT	T54	T8	CUT	
Women's British Open		CUT	T35		

^ The Evian Championship was added as a major in 2013.

Win
Top 10
Did not play

DQ = disqualified
CUT = missed the half-way cut
NT = no tournament br> T = tied

=== Summary ===
Tournament	Wins	2nd	3rd	Top-5	Top-10	Top-25	Events	Cuts made
Chevron Championship	1	1	0	2	3	4	14	12
U.S. Women's Open	1	1	2	6	6	12	14	13
Women's PGA Championship	0	1	0	2	3	7	10	9
The Evian Championship	0	1	0	2	4	5	10	8
Women's British Open	0	0	2	3	4	6	10	8
Totals	2	4	4	15	20	34	58	50

- Most consecutive cuts made – 24 (2015 ANA – 2019 Evian)
- Longest streak of top-10s – 3 (twice)

== LPGA Tour career summary ==
Year	Tournaments played	Cuts made*	Wins	2nd	3rd	Top 10s	Best finish	Earnings ($)	Money list rank	Scoring average	Scoring rank
2008	1	1	0	0	0	0	T46	5,806	n/a	74.33	n/a
2009	2	1	0	0	0	0	T29	13,111	n/a	73.80	n/a
2010	3	3	0	0	0	0	T12	61,878	n/a	73.18	n/a
2011	4	4	1	0	0	1	1	624,477	n/a	71.80	n/a
2012	24	23	1	2	0	16	1	1,282,673	6	70.30	2
2013	24	23	0	2	3	10	2	1,278,864	5	70.29	4
2014	25	24	1	1	2	15	1	1,468,804	5	69.98	4
2015	25	25	0	2	2	10	2	1,292,395	8	70.32	7
2016	24	24	0	2	1	11	2	1,259,651	10	70.07	6
2017	23	21	2	2	2	12	1	1,981,593	2	69.68	6
2018	23	23	1	0	3	7	1	1,438,850	6	70.10	9
2019	20	16	0	1	0	5	T2	815,768	23	70.81	32
2020	5	5	0	2	0	2	T2	320,626	35	71.00	n/a
2021	20	19	0	0	2	6	T3	687,086	29	70.01	14
2022	20	15	0	0	0	2	T7	332,195	72	71.09	54
2023	11	4	0	0	0	1	T7	78,668	137	72.70	134
2024	1	0	0	0	0	0	CUT	0	n/a	75.50	n/a

Official through the 2024 season
* Includes matchplay and other events without a cut.
Ryu was not a member of the LPGA Tour until 2012. Money earned from 2008 to 2011 was not considered official by the LPGA Tour.

== World ranking ==
Position in Women's World Golf Rankings at the end of each calendar year.

Year	World ranking	Source
2007	554	
2008	127	
2009	59	
2010	43	
2011	27	
2012	7	
2013	5	
2014	7	
2015	5	
2016	9	
2017	3	
2018	3	
2019	18	
2020	14	
2021	25	
2022	78	
2023	218	
2024	714	

== Team appearances ==
Amateur

- Espirito Santo Trophy (representing South Korea): 2006

Professional

- International Crown (representing South Korea): 2014, 2016, 2018 (winners)
