= Ko Jin-young =

South Korean professional golfer (born 1995)

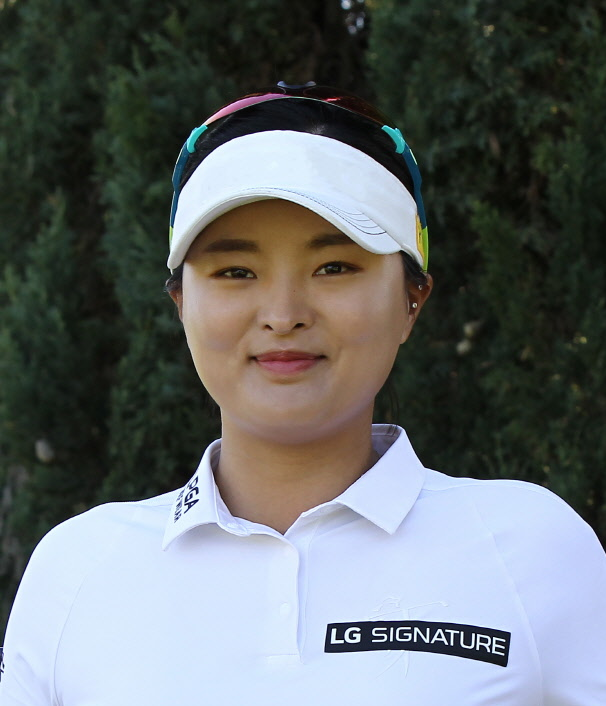

Personal information
- Nationality: South Korea
- Born: 7 July 1995 (age 31) Seoul, South Korea
- Height: 5 ft 6 in (168 cm)

Career
- Sport: Golf
- Turned professional: 2013
- Current tours: LPGA of Korea Tour; LPGA Tour
- Professional wins: 26

Number of wins by tour
- LPGA Tour: 15
- Ladies European Tour: 1
- LPGA of Korea Tour: 12
- WPGA Tour of Australasia: 1
- Other: 1

Best results in LPGA major championships (wins: 2)
- Chevron Championship: Won: 2019
- Women's PGA C'ship: T2: 2024
- U.S. Women's Open: T2: 2020
- Women's British Open: 2nd: 2015
- Evian Championship: Won: 2019

Achievements and awards
- LPGA Player of the Year: 2019, 2021
- LPGA Vare Trophy: 2019
- LPGA Rookie of the Year: 2018
- LPGA Tour Leading money winner: 2019, 2020, 2021
- Race to the CME Globe: 2020, 2021
- Rolex Annika Major Award: 2019
- GWAA Female Player of the Year: 2019

- Ko Jin-young
- Hangul: 고진영
- Hanja: 高眞榮
- RR: Go Jinyeong
- MR: Ko Chinyŏng

Ko Jin-young (Korean: 고진영; born 7 July 1995), also known as Jin Young Ko, is a South Korean professional golfer who plays on the LPGA Tour. By age 22 years, she had won 10 times on the LPGA of Korea Tour, was second at the 2015 Ricoh Women's British Open, and had won the 2017 LPGA KEB Hana Bank Championship.

Having become a member of the LPGA Tour for the 2018 season, she won her opening tournament in February – the ISPS Handa Women's Australian Open – as only the second player in LPGA history to win in her first tournament as a Tour member. With 13 top-10 finishes out of 25 tournaments played in 2018, she was named the LPGA Rookie of the Year, and completed the 2018 season as the 10th-ranked female player in the world.

In 2019, she won her first two LPGA major championships at the ANA Inspiration and the Evian Championship. Ko completed the 2019 season with the official money title ($2,773,894), the Vare Trophy for the lowest scoring average (69.06), and was named LPGA Player of the Year. In 2020, she won the LPGA official money title ($1,667,925) having played in only four tournaments due to the COVID-19 pandemic, and finished the season as the number one ranked player in the world. In 2021, Ko again won the official money title and the LPGA Player of the Year.

== Professional career ==
=== 2013–2017 ===
Having become a professional in 2013 at age 18, Ko won 10 times on the LPGA of Korea Tour over the period 2014 to 2017, winning the Nefs Masterpiece in August 2014 as her first professional victory. In 2015, she was second at the Ricoh Women's British Open. Ko won the 2017 LPGA KEB Hana Bank Championship, after which she announced her plans to join the LPGA Tour in 2018.

=== 2018 ===
Ko played in 25 LPGA Tour events in 2018, missing only one cut and finishing in the top 10 of 13 tournaments. In February, she won the ISPS Handa Women's Australian Open. For the 2018 season, the LPGA named Ko the Louise Suggs Rolex Rookie of the Year.

=== 2019 ===
On 24 March 2019, Ko won the Bank of Hope Founders Cup on the LPGA Tour, and on 7 April 2019, she won her first LPGA major championship – the ANA Inspiration. The victory elevated Ko to number one in the Women's World Golf Rankings.

On 28 July 2019, Ko clinched her second major title of the season, firing a final round 4-under 67 in the rain to win the Evian Championship by two shots with a 15-under total of 269.

On 25 August 2019, Ko won the Canadian Women's Open in Aurora, Ontario. She shot a tournament record −26 (262) and won by 5 strokes. She did not make a bogey for the entire 72 hole tournament. Ko went bogey-free for a tour-record 114 holes, ending her streak at the Cambia Portland Classic.

Having won the season's money title and Vare Trophy for lowest scoring average, Ko was named the LPGA Rolex Player of the Year for 2019.

=== 2020 ===
On 20 December 2020, Ko won the season-ending CME Group Tour Championship in Naples, Florida and the LPGA Tour's money title with only four starts.

=== 2021 ===
Between July and October 2021 in the United States, Ko won the Volunteers of America Classic in The Colony, Texas, the Portland Classic in West Linn, Oregon, and the Cognizant Founders Cup in West Caldwell, New Jersey. By shooting 66 in her final round at the Founders Cup, she tied Annika Sörenstam's 16-year-old record of 14 consecutive rounds in the 60s. Ko's streak began in the final round of the Evian Championship in July, enabling two wins, a second-place finish, and a tie for sixth in the four tournaments of the streak.

Later in October 2021, Ko won the BMW Ladies Championship in South Korea for her fourth win of the year, 11th overall on the LPGA Tour, and the 200th victory on the LPGA by a South Korean. Ko is the fifth South Korean with at least 10 career LPGA victories. The victory at the BMW Ladies Championship re-established Ko as the world number one in the official women's golf ranking as of October 25, but the 8 November ranking dropped her to #2, a fraction of an average point per event (9.028 to 9.032) behind Nelly Korda, because the calculations are over a two-year rolling average.

In November 2021, Ko successfully defended her title at the CME Group Tour Championship in Naples, Florida. She also won the Race to the CME Globe, Player of the Year, and topped the money list.

=== 2022 ===
In March 2022, Ko won the HSBC Women's World Championship in Singapore. This was her 13th career LPGA Tour win and sixth win in her last 10 starts since June 2021.

On 31 October, without her or Atthaya Thitikul playing in a tournament the prior week (24 October), she fell to world No. 2 on her average points from 7.25 to 7.09, to make Thitikul (7.20 to 7.13) become the new world No. 1 in the women's golf rankings.

=== 2023 ===
Ko successfully defended her HSBC Women's World Championship title in Singapore on 5 March, defeating Nelly Korda by two strokes. She reclaimed the world number one ranking on 22 May 2023, a week after winning her third Cognizant Founders Cup title, beating Minjee Lee in a playoff.

Ko passed Lorena Ochoa for most weeks at number one in the Women's World Golf Rankings with 159 as of 26 June 2023.

Ko lost in a playoff to Megan Khang on 27 August at the CPKC Women's Open when she double bogeyed the first playoff hole to Khang's par. But she earned $232,029 for the second place finish, pushing her total LPGA winnings to over $11.8 million and into the top 20 all-time.

== Professional wins (26) ==
=== LPGA of Korea Tour wins (12) ===
No.	Date	Tournament	Winning score	To par	Margin of victory	Runner-up
1	17 Aug 2014	Nefs Masterpiece	71-70-70-70=281	−7	1 stroke	(South Korea) Cho Yoon-ji
2	26 Apr 2015	Nexen-Saint Nine Masters	70-65-68=203	−13	1 stroke	(South Korea) Lee Seung-hyun
3	10 May 2015	KyoChon Honey Ladies Open	70-68-70=208	−11	3 strokes	(South Korea) Bae Seon-woo
4	12 Jul 2015	Chojung Sparkling-Yongpyong Resort Open	67-67-69=203	−13	1 stroke	(South Korea) Kim Ye-jin
5	1 May 2016	KG-Edaily Ladies Open	64-68-69=201	−15	1 stroke	(South Korea) Kim Min-sun
6	17 Jun 2016	BMW Ladies Championship	65-68-72-70=275	−13	2 strokes	(South Korea) Jung Hee-won
7	9 Oct 2016	Hite Jinro Championship	70-66-74-70=280	−8	6 strokes	(South Korea) Cho Jeong-min
8	13 Aug 2017	Jeju Samdasoo Masters	67-66-66=199	−17	4 strokes	(South Korea) Kim Hae-rym
9	17 Sep 2017	BMW Ladies Championship	69-68-67-68=272	−12	1 strokes	(South Korea) Heo Yoon-kyung
10	15 Oct 2017	LPGA KEB–Hana Bank Championship^{1}	68-67-66-68=269	−19	2 strokes	(South Korea) Park Sung-hyun
11	13 Oct 2019	Hite Jinro Championship	71-71-71-72=285	−3	1 stroke	(South Korea) Choi Hye-jin, (South Korea) Kim Ji-yeong, (South Korea) Lee So-mi, (South Korea) Na Hee-won
12	24 Oct 2021	BMW Ladies Championship^{1}	71-64-67-64=266	−22	Playoff	(South Korea) Lim Hee-jeong

^{1} Co-sanctioned with LPGA Tour

=== LPGA Tour wins (15) ===
Legend
Major championships (2)
Other LPGA Tour (13)

No.	Date	Tournament	Winning score	To par	Margin of victory	Runner(s)-up
1	15 Oct 2017	LPGA KEB–Hana Bank Championship^{1}	68-67-66-68=269	−19	2 strokes	(South Korea) Park Sung-hyun
2	18 Feb 2018	ISPS Handa Australian Women's Open	65-69-71-69=274	−14	3 strokes	(South Korea) Choi Hye-jin
3	24 Mar 2019	Bank of Hope Founders Cup	65-72-64-65=266	−22	1 stroke	(Spain) Carlota Ciganda (United States) Jessica Korda (United States) Nelly Korda (China) Yu Liu
4	7 Apr 2019	ANA Inspiration	69-71-68-70=278	−10	3 strokes	(South Korea) Lee Mi-hyang
5	28 Jul 2019	The Evian Championship	65-71-66-67=269	−15	2 strokes	(China) Shanshan Feng (South Korea) Kim Hyo-joo (United States) Jennifer Kupcho
6	25 Aug 2019	CP Women's Open	66-67-65-64=262	−26	5 strokes	(Denmark) Nicole Broch Larsen
7	20 Dec 2020	CME Group Tour Championship	68-67-69-66=270	−18	5 strokes	(Australia) Hannah Green (South Korea) Kim Sei-young
8	4 Jul 2021	Volunteers of America Classic	63-70-66-69=268	−16	1 stroke	(Finland) Matilda Castren
9	19 Sep 2021	Cambia Portland Classic	69-67-69=205	−11	4 strokes	(South Korea) Lee Jeong-eun (Australia) Su-Hyun Oh
10	10 Oct 2021	Cognizant Founders Cup	63-68-69-66=266	−18	4 strokes	(Germany) Caroline Masson
11	24 Oct 2021	BMW Ladies Championship^{1}	71-64-67-64=266	−22	Playoff	(South Korea) Lim Hee-jeong
12	21 Nov 2021	CME Group Tour Championship	69-67-66-63=265	−23	1 stroke	(Japan) Nasa Hataoka
13	6 Mar 2022	HSBC Women's World Championship	69-67-69-66=271	−17	2 strokes	(South Korea) Chun In-gee (Australia) Minjee Lee
14	5 Mar 2023	HSBC Women's World Championship	72-65-65-69=271	−17	2 strokes	(United States) Nelly Korda
15	14 May 2023	Cognizant Founders Cup	68-68-72-67=275	−13	Playoff	(Australia) Minjee Lee

^{1} Co-sanctioned with KLPGA Tour

LPGA Tour playoff record (2–2)

No.	Year	Tournament	Opponent(s)	Result
1	2021	BMW Ladies Championship	(South Korea) Lim Hee-jeong	Won with birdie on first extra hole
2	2023	Cognizant Founders Cup	(Australia) Minjee Lee	Won with par on first extra hole
3	2023	CPKC Women's Open	(United States) Megan Khang	Lost to par on first extra hole
4	2024	FM Championship	(South Korea) Ryu Hae-ran	Lost to par on first extra hole

=== Other wins (1) ===
- 2016 World Ladies Championship - team (with Lee Jung-min)

== Major championships ==
=== Wins (2) ===
Year	Championship	54 holes	Winning score	Margin	Runner(s)-up
2019	ANA Inspiration	1 shot lead	−10 (69-71-68-70=278)	3 strokes	(South Korea) Lee Mi-hyang
2019	The Evian Championship	4 shot deficit	−15 (65-71-66-67=269)	2 strokes	(China) Shanshan Feng, (South Korea) Kim Hyo-joo (United States) Jennifer Kupcho

=== Results timeline ===
Results not in chronological order.

Tournament	2015	2016	2017	2018	2019	2020	2021	2022	2023	2024	2025	2026
Chevron Championship		T71	CUT	T64	1		T7	T53	T9	CUT	T6	CUT
U.S. Women's Open			T15	T17	T16	T2	T7	4	CUT	T29	T14	CUT
Women's PGA Championship				T11	T14		T46	T30	T20	T2	WD	T42
The Evian Championship	28	T39		T26	1	NT	T60	T8	T20	T35	T35	CUT
Women's British Open	2			CUT	3			CUT	T30	CUT	CUT	T47

Win
Top 10
Did not play

CUT = missed the half-way cut
WD = withdrew
NT = no tournament
T = tied

=== Summary ===
Tournament	Wins	2nd	3rd	Top-5	Top-10	Top-25	Events	Cuts made
Chevron Championship	1	0	0	1	4	4	10	7
U.S. Women's Open	0	1	0	2	3	7	10	8
Women's PGA Championship	0	1	0	1	1	4	8	7
The Evian Championship	1	0	0	1	2	3	10	9
Women's British Open	0	1	1	2	2	2	8	4
Totals	2	3	1	7	12	20	46	35

- Most consecutive cuts made – 15 (2018 Evian – 2022 Evian)
- Longest streak of top-10s – 5 (2019 Evian – 2021 U.S. Open)

== LPGA Tour career summary ==
Year	Tournaments played	Cuts made *	Wins	2nd	3rd	Top 10s	Best finish	Earnings ($)	Money list rank	Scoring average	Scoring rank
2014	1	1	0	0	0	0	T42	n/a	n/a	72.50	n/a
2015	3	3	0	1	0	1	2	n/a	n/a	70.33	n/a
2016	3	3	0	0	0	0	T39	n/a	n/a	72.58	n/a
2017	4	3	1	0	0	1	1	n/a	n/a	70.14	n/a
2018	25	24	1	1	1	13	1	1,159,005	10	69.81	3
2019	22	22	4	3	2	12	1	2,773,894	1	69.06	1
2020	4	4	1	1	0	3	1	1,667,925	1	69.69	n/a
2021	19	18	5	1	1	13	1	3,502,161	1	68.87	2
2022	16	12	1	1	0	5	1	1,260,471	17	70.67	32
2023	18	17	2	1	0	6	1	1,552,244	16	69.99	7
2024	18	16	0	2	0	7	2	1,774,824	13	70.47	12
2025	20	15	0	1	0	4	2	1,051,538	40	70.34	22
Totals^	142	125	15	11	4	63	1	14,742,062	14		
Pre-member totals	11	10	–	1	0	2	1		–	–	–

^ Official as of 2025 season
* Includes matchplay and other tournaments without a cut.

== World ranking ==
Position in Women's World Golf Rankings at the end of each calendar year.

Year	World ranking	Source
2018	10	
2019	1	
2020	1	
2021	2	
2022	5	
2023	6	
2024	11	
2025	26	

== Team appearances ==
Professional

- The Queens (representing Korea): 2015, 2016 (winners), 2017
- International Crown (representing South Korea): 2023, 2025

== Awards ==
- 2018 LPGA Rookie of the Year
- 2019 LPGA Vare Trophy for lowest scoring average
- 2019 Rolex Annika Major Award
- 2019 LPGA leading money winner
- 2019 LPGA Player of the Year
- 2020 LPGA leading money winner
- 2021 LPGA Player of the Year
- 2021 LPGA leading money winner

== See also ==
- List of golfers with most LPGA Tour wins
- List of LPGA major championship winning golfers
