= 2025 Women's PGA Championship =

Golf tournament

2025 KPMG Women's PGA Championship
Tournament information
- Dates: June 19–22, 2025
- Location: Frisco, Texas; 33.213°N 96.853°W
- Courses: PGA Frisco; Fields Ranch East
- Organized by: PGA of America
- Tour: LPGA Tour

Statistics
- Par: 72
- Length: 6,604 yards (6,039 m)
- Field: 156 players, 78 after cut
- Cut: 151 (+7)
- Prize fund: $12,000,000
- Winner's share: $1,800,000

Champion
- (Australia) Minjee Lee
- 284 (−4)
- Location in the United States Location in Texas

The 2025 KPMG Women's PGA Championship was the 71st Women's PGA Championship. It was played June 19–22 on the Fields Ranch East course at PGA Frisco in Frisco, Texas, a suburb north of Dallas. It was the first time the Fields Ranch East course hosted a LPGA major; it hosted the KitchenAid Senior PGA Championship, a senior men's major, in 2023.

The PGA Championship was the third of five major championships on the LPGA Tour during the 2025 season.

Minjee Lee won by three strokes over Auston Kim and Chanettee Wannasaen. It was Lee's third major championship win.

== Field ==
The field included 156 players who met one or more of the selection criteria and commit to participate by a designated deadline.

1. Sponsor invitations (Note: Maximum of two)

- Stacy Lewis
- Mimi Rhodes

2. Past winners of the Women's PGA Championship

- Chun In-gee (12)
- Hannah Green (4,12)
- Brooke Henderson (3,4,12)
- Danielle Kang
- Cristie Kerr
- Kim Sei-young (12)
- Nelly Korda (3,4,12)
- Anna Nordqvist (3,12)
- Park Sung-hyun
- Yani Tseng
- Amy Yang (4,7,12)
- Yin Ruoning (4,5,12)

3. Professionals who have won an LPGA major championship in the previous five years and during the current year

- Céline Boutier (4,12)
- Ashleigh Buhai (4,12)
- Allisen Corpuz (12)
- Ayaka Furue (12)
- Kim A-lim (4,12)
- Lydia Ko (4,12)
- Jennifer Kupcho (4,12)
- Minjee Lee (4,12)
- Mirim Lee
- Sophia Popov
- Mao Saigo (7,12)
- Yuka Saso (12)
- Maja Stark (12)
- Patty Tavatanakit (4,12)
- Lilia Vu (4,7,12)

4. Professionals who have won an official LPGA tournament in the previous two calendar years and during the current year

- Pajaree Anannarukarn (12)
- Lauren Coughlin (12)
- Linn Grant (7,12)
- Chisato Iwai (12)
- Moriya Jutanugarn (12)
- Megan Khang (12)
- Grace Kim (12)
- Kim Hyo-joo (12)
- Ko Jin-young (7,12)
- Ingrid Lindblad (12)
- Leona Maguire (12)
- Yealimi Noh (12)
- Alexa Pano (12)
- Ryu Hae-ran (7,12)
- Madelene Sagström (12)
- Linnea Ström (12)
- Thidapa Suwannapura (12)
- Rio Takeda (6,12)
- Bailey Tardy (12)
- Atthaya Thitikul (5,12)
- Chanettee Wannasaen (12)
- Angel Yin (12)
- Rose Zhang (12)
- Mone Inami did not play

5. Winners of the 2024 Dow Great Lakes Bay Invitational

6. Order of Merit winners from the Ladies European Tour, LPGA of Japan Tour, and LPGA of Korea Tour

- Chiara Tamburlini
- Ina Yoon (12)

7. Professionals who finished top-10 and ties at the previous year's Women's PGA Championship

- Lauren Hartlage (12)
- Caroline Inglis (12)
- Sarah Schmelzel (12)
- Hinako Shibuno (12)
- Lexi Thompson (12)
- Miyū Yamashita (12)
- Ally Ewing (8) did not play

8. Professionals ranked No. 1–60 on the Women's World Golf Rankings as of May 19, 2025

- Bang Shin-sil
- Choi Hye-jin (12)
- Carlota Ciganda (12)
- Lindy Duncan (12)
- Nasa Hataoka (12)
- Esther Henseleit (12)
- Charley Hull (12)
- Hwang You-min
- Im Jin-hee (12)
- Akie Iwai (12)
- Ariya Jutanugarn (12)
- Yui Kawamoto
- Kim Su-ji
- Shiho Kuwaki
- Stephanie Kyriacou (12)
- Andrea Lee (12)
- Lee Mi-hyang (12)
- Gaby López (12)
- Nanna Koerstz Madsen (12)
- Gabriela Ruffels (12)
- Sakura Koiwai, Alison Lee, Lee Ye-won, Lin Xiyu, Ma Da-som, Park Hyun-kyung, Park Ji-young, Jiyai Shin, and Yoo Hyun-jo did not play

9. The top eight finishers at the 2024 LPGA Professionals National Championship

- Heather Angell
- Sandra Changkija
- Alison Curdt
- Nicole Felce
- Ashley Grier
- Allie Knight
- Natalie Vivaldi
- Allie White

10. The top finisher (not otherwise qualified via the 2024 LPGA Professionals National Championship) at the 2025 PGA Women's Stroke Play Championship

- Katelyn Sepmoree

11. Any player who did not compete in the 2024 KPMG Women's PGA Championship due to maternity (Note: As approved by the Women’s PGA Championship in conjunction with the player’s home tour, provided she was otherwise qualified to compete in the 2024 Women’s PGA Championship.)

- Joanna Coe

12. LPGA members who have committed to the event, ranked in the order of their position on the 2025 CME Globe Points list

- An Na-rin
- Aditi Ashok
- Saki Baba
- Jenny Bae
- Ana Belac
- Pei-Yun Chien
- Robyn Choi
- Olivia Cowan
- Karis Davidson
- Manon De Roey
- Brianna Do
- Gemma Dryburgh
- Jodi Ewart Shadoff
- Mariel Galdiano
- Kristen Gillman
- Savannah Grewal
- Nataliya Guseva
- Georgia Hall
- Muni He
- Hsu Wei-ling
- Jeon Ji-won
- Joo Soo-bin
- Haeji Kang
- Minami Katsu
- Gurleen Kaur
- Auston Kim
- Frida Kinhult
- Cheyenne Knight
- Aline Krauter
- Ilhee Lee
- Lee Jeong-eun
- Lee Jeong-eun
- Lee So-mi
- Lucy Li
- Mary Liu
- Ruixin Liu
- Liu Yan
- Yu Liu
- Julia López Ramirez
- Caroline Masson
- Brooke Matthews
- Morgane Métraux
- Benedetta Moresco
- Azahara Muñoz
- Hira Naveed
- Yuna Nishimura
- Ryann O'Toole
- Bianca Pagdanganan
- Park Kum-kang
- Emily Kristine Pedersen
- Pornanong Phatlum
- Cassie Porter
- Paula Reto
- Pauline Roussin
- Jenny Shin
- Gigi Stoll
- Elizabeth Szokol
- Albane Valenzuela
- Miranda Wang
- Dewi Weber
- Jing Yan
- Yuri Yoshida
- Madison Young
- Arpichaya Yubol
- Zhang Yahui
- Zhang Weiwei

== Round summaries ==
=== First round ===
Thursday, June 19, 2025

Atthaya Thitikul shot a 4-under-par 68 to lead by one stroke over Minjee Lee. The weather was hot and windy and only 15 players scored under par for the round.

| Place | Player | Score | To par |
|---|---|---|---|
| 1 | (Thailand) Atthaya Thitikul | 68 | −4 |
| 2 | (Australia) Minjee Lee | 69 | −3 |
| T3 | (South Korea) Lee So-mi | 70 | −2 |
| T3 | (United States) Yealimi Noh | 70 | −2 |
| T3 | (South Korea) Ryu Hae-ran | 70 | −2 |
| T3 | (Japan) Rio Takeda | 70 | −2 |
| T7 | (South Korea) Bang Shin-sil | 71 | −1 |
| T7 | (Taiwan) Pei-Yun Chien | 71 | −1 |
| T7 | (South Korea) Chun In-gee | 71 | −1 |
| T7 | (South Korea) Hwang You-min | 71 | −1 |
| T7 | (Japan) Chisato Iwai | 71 | −1 |
| T7 | (United States) Auston Kim | 71 | −1 |
| T7 | (Japan) Yuna Nishimura | 71 | −1 |
| T7 | (South Korea) Park Kum-kang | 71 | −1 |
| T7 | (United States) Angel Yin | 71 | −1 |

=== Second round ===
Friday, June 20, 2025

Atthaya Thitikul extended her lead to three strokes with a 2-under-par round of 70. In second place were Minjee Lee and Rio Takeda. The cut came at 151 (+7), with 78 players advancing to the weekend. Defending champion Amy Yang missed the cut with a +9.

| Place | Player | Score | To par |
|---|---|---|---|
| 1 | (Thailand) Atthaya Thitikul | 68-70=138 | −6 |
| T2 | (Australia) Minjee Lee | 69-72=141 | −3 |
| T2 | (Japan) Rio Takeda | 70-71=141 | −3 |
| 4 | (United States) Lexi Thompson | 72-70=142 | −2 |
| T5 | (Japan) Chisato Iwai | 71-72=143 | −1 |
| T5 | (United States) Auston Kim | 71-72=143 | −1 |
| T5 | (South Korea) Lee So-mi | 70-73=143 | −1 |
| T8 | (South Korea) Bang Shin-sil | 71-73=144 | E |
| T8 | (United States) Yealimi Noh | 70-74=144 | E |
| T8 | (Japan) Miyū Yamashita | 73-71=144 | E |

=== Third round ===
Saturday, June 21, 2025

Minjee Lee shot a 3-under-par round of 69 to take a four-stroke lead over second-round leader Atthaya Thitikul who shot a 76. Lee's round was the first bogey-free round of the tournament.

| Place | Player | Score | To par |
|---|---|---|---|
| 1 | (Australia) Minjee Lee | 69-72-69=210 | −6 |
| 2 | (Thailand) Atthaya Thitikul | 68-70-76=214 | −2 |
| T3 | (South Korea) Choi Hye-jin | 75-70-72=217 | +1 |
| T3 | (United States) Lexi Thompson | 72-70-75=217 | +1 |
| T3 | (Japan) Miyū Yamashita | 73-71-73=217 | +1 |
| T6 | (Japan) Chisato Iwai | 71-72-75=218 | +2 |
| T6 | (United States) Nelly Korda | 72-74-72=218 | +2 |
| T6 | (Republic of Ireland) Leona Maguire | 72-74-72=218 | +2 |
| T6 | (United States) Yealimi Noh | 70-74-74=218 | +2 |
| T10 | (United States) Auston Kim | 71-72-76=219 | +3 |
| T10 | (Australia) Grace Kim | 73-78-68=219 | +3 |
| T10 | (South Korea) Lee So-mi | 70-73-76=219 | +3 |
| T10 | (Thailand) Chanettee Wannasaen | 75-72-72=219 | +3 |
| T10 | (China) Yin Ruoning | 76-71-72=219 | +3 |

=== Final round ===
Sunday, June 22, 2025

Minjee Lee shot a 2-over-par round of 74 but still won by three strokes over Auston Kim and Chanettee Wannasaen. It was Lee's third major championship win.

Champion
(c) = past champion

| Place | Player | Score | To par | Money ($) |
|---|---|---|---|---|
| 1 | (Australia) Minjee Lee | 69-72-69-74=284 | −4 | 1,800,000 |
| T2 | (United States) Auston Kim | 71-72-76-68=287 | −1 | 914,169 |
| T2 | (Thailand) Chanettee Wannasaen | 75-72-72-68=287 | −1 | 914,169 |
| T4 | (Japan) Chisato Iwai | 71-72-75-71=289 | +1 | 536,635 |
| T4 | (Thailand) Atthaya Thitikul | 68-70-76-75=289 | +1 | 536,635 |
| T6 | (Japan) Miyū Yamashita | 73-71-73-73=290 | +2 | 359,691 |
| T6 | (United States) Angel Yin | 71-75-75-69=290 | +2 | 359,691 |
| T8 | (South Korea) Choi Hye-jin | 75-70-72-74=291 | +3 | 272,672 |
| T8 | (South Korea) Lee So-mi | 70-73-76-72=291 | +3 | 272,672 |
| T10 | (Taiwan) Hsu Wei-ling | 75-75-72-70=292 | +4 | 226,255 |
| T10 | (France) Pauline Roussin | 75-74-73-70=292 | +4 | 226,255 |

Leaderboard below the top 10
| Place | Player | Score | To par | Money ($) |
|---|---|---|---|---|
| T12 | (Germany) Esther Henseleit | 73-73-75-72=293 | +5 | 170,560 |
| T12 | (England) Charley Hull | 78-69-73-73=293 | +5 | 170,560 |
| T12 | (New Zealand) Lydia Ko | 75-73-74-71=293 | +5 | 170,560 |
| T12 | (United States) Lucy Li | 74-76-72-71=293 | +5 | 170,560 |
| T12 | (United States) Yealimi Noh | 70-74-74-75=293 | +5 | 170,560 |
| T12 | (South Korea) Jenny Shin | 72-78-73-70=293 | +5 | 170,560 |
| T12 | (United States) Lexi Thompson | 72-70-75-76=293 | +5 | 170,560 |
| T19 | (South Korea) Hwang You-min | 71-74-76-73=294 | +6 | 131,113 |
| T19 | (United States) Nelly Korda (c) | 72-74-72-76=294 | +6 | 131,113 |
| T19 | (Republic of Ireland) Leona Maguire | 72-74-72-76=294 | +6 | 131,113 |
| T19 | (China) Miranda Wang | 77-72-72-73=294 | +6 | 131,113 |
| T23 | (South Korea) Bang Shin-sil | 71-73-76-75=295 | +7 | 108,875 |
| T23 | (United States) Brianna Do | 75-71-75-74=295 | +7 | 108,875 |
| T23 | (United States) Jennifer Kupcho | 76-73-77-69=295 | +7 | 108,875 |
| T23 | (United States) Andrea Lee | 73-78-71-73=295 | +7 | 108,875 |
| T23 | (Japan) Rio Takeda | 70-71-80-74=295 | +7 | 108,875 |
| T23 | (China) Yin Ruoning (c) | 76-71-72-76=295 | +7 | 108,875 |
| T29 | (Japan) Akie Iwai | 75-74-78-69=296 | +8 | 92,824 |
| T29 | (Spain) Azahara Muñoz | 75-75-72-74=296 | +8 | 92,824 |
| T31 | (South Korea) Chun In-gee (c) | 71-76-75-75=297 | +9 | 80,755 |
| T31 | (United States) Lindy Duncan | 77-71-78-71=297 | +9 | 80,755 |
| T31 | (South Korea) Lee Mi-hyang | 72-73-77-75=297 | +9 | 80,755 |
| T31 | (China) Ruixin Liu | 73-72-76-76=297 | +9 | 80,755 |
| T31 | (Netherlands) Dewi Weber | 73-76-74-74=297 | +9 | 80,755 |
| T36 | (Japan) Nasa Hataoka | 77-72-75-74=298 | +10 | 60,722 |
| T36 | (Canada) Brooke Henderson (c) | 74-72-74-78=298 | +10 | 60,722 |
| T36 | (Japan) Minami Katsu | 74-74-75-75=298 | +10 | 60,722 |
| T36 | (Australia) Grace Kim | 73-78-68-79=298 | +10 | 60,722 |
| T36 | (China) Mary Liu | 76-71-78-73=298 | +10 | 60,722 |
| T36 | (Switzerland) Morgane Métraux | 75-75-73-75=298 | +10 | 60,722 |
| T36 | (South Korea) Park Kum-kang | 71-78-76-73=298 | +10 | 60,722 |
| T36 | (Spain) Julia López Ramírez | 79-71-75-73=298 | +10 | 60,722 |
| T36 | (Australia) Gabriela Ruffels | 77-74-75-72=298 | +10 | 60,722 |
| T45 | (China) Liu Yan | 72-75-79-73=299 | +11 | 48,441 |
| T45 | (Thailand) Arpichaya Yubol | 74-75-75-75=299 | +11 | 48,441 |
| T47 | (United States) Jenny Bae | 73-73-77-77=300 | +12 | 42,465 |
| T47 | (Australia) Karis Davidson | 74-75-76-75=300 | +12 | 42,465 |
| T47 | (Australia) Stephanie Kyriacou | 72-75-78-75=300 | +12 | 42,465 |
| T47 | (Mexico) Gaby López | 77-70-74-79=300 | +12 | 42,465 |
| T47 | (Sweden) Maja Stark | 75-70-77-78=300 | +12 | 42,465 |
| T52 | (South Korea) Joo Soo-bin | 72-76-78-75=301 | +13 | 33,648 |
| T52 | (Thailand) Ariya Jutanugarn | 73-78-75-75=301 | +13 | 33,648 |
| T52 | (United States) Megan Khang | 76-73-76-76=301 | +13 | 33,648 |
| T52 | (South Korea) Kim Sei-young (c) | 75-75-75-76=301 | +13 | 33,648 |
| T52 | (Denmark) Nanna Koerstz Madsen | 75-75-78-73=301 | +13 | 33,648 |
| T52 | (United States) Ryann O'Toole | 75-75-76-75=301 | +13 | 33,648 |
| T52 | (Philippines) Bianca Pagdanganan | 74-77-78-72=301 | +13 | 33,648 |
| T52 | (South Africa) Paula Reto | 73-75-78-75=301 | +13 | 33,648 |
| T52 | (Thailand) Patty Tavatanakit | 77-73-77-74=301 | +13 | 33,648 |
| T61 | (Taiwan) Pei-Yun Chien | 71-75-80-76=302 | +14 | 27,267 |
| T61 | (United States) Brooke Matthews | 74-73-79-76=302 | +14 | 27,267 |
| T61 | (Japan) Yuna Nishimura | 71-77-76-78=302 | +14 | 27,267 |
| T61 | (South Korea) Ryu Hae-ran | 70-80-80-72=302 | +14 | 27,267 |
| T61 | (China) Jing Yan | 74-77-75-76=302 | +14 | 27,267 |
| T66 | (South Korea) An Na-rin | 75-74-78-76=303 | +15 | 25,238 |
| T66 | (Japan) Yuka Saso | 79-72-76-76=303 | +15 | 25,238 |
| 68 | (Australia) Hannah Green (c) | 74-74-81-75=304 | +16 | 24,361 |
| T69 | (Slovenia) Ana Belac | 74-72-81-78=305 | +17 | 23,497 |
| T69 | (Thailand) Moriya Jutanugarn | 75-72-79-79=305 | +17 | 23,497 |
| T71 | (Spain) Carlota Ciganda | 74-73-82-77=306 | +18 | 22,770 |
| T71 | (Thailand) Thidapa Suwannapura | 72-76-82-76=306 | +18 | 22,770 |
| 73 | (United States) Rose Zhang | 72-79-78-78=307 | +19 | 22,332 |
| 74 | (Germany) Olivia Cowan | 73-78-80-77=308 | +20 | 22,044 |
| T75 | (Russia) Nataliya Guseva | 77-73-82-77=309 | +21 | 21,641 |
| T75 | (United States) Lauren Hartlage | 75-74-79-81=309 | +21 | 21,641 |
| 77 | (Australia) Hira Naveed | 75-76-86-75=312 | +24 | 21,229 |
| 78 | (South Korea) Ilhee Lee | 76-75-85-77=313 | +25 | 20,959 |
| CUT | (South Africa) Ashleigh Buhai | 75-77=152 | +8 | |
| CUT | (Australia) Robyn Choi | 74-78=152 | +8 | |
| CUT | (United States) Allisen Corpuz | 73-79=152 | +8 | |
| CUT | (Belgium) Manon De Roey | 76-76=152 | +8 | |
| CUT | (England) Jodi Ewart Shadoff | 79-73=152 | +8 | |
| CUT | (Sweden) Linn Grant | 77-75=152 | +8 | |
| CUT | (Canada) Savannah Grewal | 75-77=152 | +8 | |
| CUT | (South Korea) Jeon Ji-won | 78-74=152 | +8 | |
| CUT | (South Korea) Haeji Kang | 74-78=152 | +8 | |
| CUT | (South Korea) Kim A-lim | 73-79=152 | +8 | |
| CUT | (Japan) Shiho Kuwaki | 82-70=152 | +8 | |
| CUT | (South Korea) Lee Jeong-eun | 74-78=152 | +8 | |
| CUT | (Sweden) Anna Nordqvist (c) | 78-74=152 | +8 | |
| CUT | (Denmark) Emily Kristine Pedersen | 79-73=152 | +8 | |
| CUT | (England) Mimi Rhodes | 76-76=152 | +8 | |
| CUT | (United States) Elizabeth Szokol | 75-77=152 | +8 | |
| CUT | (South Korea) Im Jin-hee | 75-78=153 | +9 | |
| CUT | (United States) Gurleen Kaur | 78-75=153 | +9 | |
| CUT | (Japan) Yui Kawamoto | 77-76=153 | +9 | |
| CUT | (Germany) Aline Krauter | 79-74=153 | +9 | |
| CUT | (Thailand) Pornanong Phatlum | 74-79=153 | +9 | |
| CUT | (Sweden) Madelene Sagström | 75-78=153 | +9 | |
| CUT | (Japan) Mao Saigo | 73-80=153 | +9 | |
| CUT | (Japan) Hinako Shibuno | 74-79=153 | +9 | |
| CUT | (United States) Bailey Tardy | 77-76=153 | +9 | |
| CUT | (Taiwan) Yani Tseng (c) | 75-78=153 | +9 | |
| CUT | (United States) Lilia Vu | 77-76=153 | +9 | |
| CUT | (South Korea) Amy Yang (c) | 76-77=153 | +9 | |
| CUT | (South Korea) Yoon Ina | 78-75=153 | +9 | |
| CUT | (United States) Madison Young | 76-77=153 | +9 | |
| CUT | (China) Zhang Weiwei | 76-77=153 | +9 | |
| CUT | (Thailand) Pajaree Anannarukarn | 76-78=154 | +10 | |
| CUT | (Japan) Saki Baba | 76-78=154 | +10 | |
| CUT | (Scotland) Gemma Dryburgh | 77-77=154 | +10 | |
| CUT | (England) Georgia Hall | 73-81=154 | +10 | |
| CUT | (South Korea) Kim Su-ji | 78-76=154 | +10 | |
| CUT | (Sweden) Frida Kinhult | 75-79=154 | +10 | |
| CUT | (United States) Stacy Lewis | 78-76=154 | +10 | |
| CUT | (Sweden) Ingrid Lindblad | 78-76=154 | +10 | |
| CUT | (Australia) Cassie Porter | 78-76=154 | +10 | |
| CUT | (United States) Sarah Schmelzel | 79-75=154 | +10 | |
| CUT | (United States) Gigi Stoll | 80-74=154 | +10 | |
| CUT | (Switzerland) Albane Valenzuela | 77-77=154 | +10 | |
| CUT | (Japan) Yuri Yoshida | 78-76=154 | +10 | |
| CUT | (France) Céline Boutier | 76-79=155 | +11 | |
| CUT | (United States) Joanna Coe | 76-79=155 | +11 | |
| CUT | (Japan) Ayaka Furue | 79-76=155 | +11 | |
| CUT | (United States) Mariel Galdiano | 77-78=155 | +11 | |
| CUT | (China) Muni He | 74-81=155 | +11 | |
| CUT | (Germany) Caroline Masson | 83-72=155 | +11 | |
| CUT | (Sweden) Linnea Ström | 75-80=155 | +11 | |
| CUT | (United States) Allie White | 75-80=155 | +11 | |
| CUT | (United States) Cristie Kerr (c) | 78-78=156 | +12 | |
| CUT | (Germany) Sophia Popov | 76-80=156 | +12 | |
| CUT | (China) Zhang Yahui | 78-78=156 | +12 | |
| CUT | (United States) Sandra Changkija | 80-77=157 | +13 | |
| CUT | (United States) Lauren Coughlin | 80-77=157 | +13 | |
| CUT | (United States) Danielle Kang (c) | 80-77=157 | +13 | |
| CUT | (Switzerland) Chiara Tamburlini | 79-78=157 | +13 | |
| CUT | (China) Yu Liu | 78-80=158 | +14 | |
| CUT | (United States) Kristen Gillman | 77-82=159 | +15 | |
| CUT | (United States) Cheyenne Knight | 79-80=159 | +15 | |
| CUT | (South Korea) Park Sung-hyun (c) | 76-83=159 | +15 | |
| CUT | (United States) Nicole Felce | 82-78=160 | +16 | |
| CUT | (United States) Caroline Inglis | 77-83=160 | +16 | |
| CUT | (South Korea) Lee Jeong-eun | 76-84=160 | +16 | |
| CUT | (United States) Natalie Vivaldi | 76-84=160 | +16 | |
| CUT | (United States) Allie Knight | 78-83=161 | +17 | |
| CUT | (Italy) Benedetta Moresco | 78-83=161 | +17 | |
| CUT | (United States) Alexa Pano | 78-85=163 | +19 | |
| CUT | (India) Aditi Ashok | 81-83=164 | +20 | |
| CUT | (United States) Katelyn Sepmoree | 79-85=164 | +20 | |
| CUT | (South Korea) Mirim Lee | 85-82=167 | +23 | |
| CUT | (United States) Ashley Grier | 84-85=169 | +25 | |
| CUT | (United States) Alison Curdt | 92-90=182 | +38 | |
| WD | (South Korea) Ko Jin-young | 74 | +2 | |
| WD | (South Korea) Kim Hyo-joo | 76 | +4 | |
| DQ | (United States) Heather Angell | 87 | +15 | |
