= 2024 U.S. Women's Open =

2024 U.S. Women's Open presented by Ally

Tournament information
- Dates: May 30 – June 2, 2024
- Location: Lancaster, Pennsylvania, U.S. 40.0617°N 76.2708°W
- Course: Lancaster Country Club Meadowcreek / Dogwood Course
- Organized by: USGA
- Tour: LPGA Tour

Statistics
- Par: 70
- Length: 6,546 yards (5,986 m)
- Field: 156 players, 75 after cut
- Cut: 148 (+8)
- Prize fund: $12,000,000
- Winner's share: $2,400,000

Champion
- (Japan) Yuka Saso
- 276 (−4)
- Location in the United States Location in Pennsylvania

The 2024 U.S. Women's Open presented by Ally was the 79th U.S. Women's Open, played May 30 to June 2 at the Lancaster Country Club in Lancaster, Pennsylvania.

On February 1, 2024, Ally Financial announced it was becoming the event sponsor, replacing ProMedica as the sponsor of the tournament (all five majors in women's golf have sponsors). The purse for the tournament was a record $12 million. The winner's share is now 20% for the men's and women's Open Championships, earning the Women's Open winner $2.4 million.

Yuka Saso won by three strokes over compatriot Hinako Shibuno. It was Saso's second U.S. Women's Open win, having also won in 2021. It was her second major win and second LPGA Tour win.

== Venue ==
The course had previously hosted the 2015 U.S. Women's Open.

== Field ==
The field for the U.S. Women's Open was made up of players who gained entry through qualifying events and those who were exempt from qualifying. The exemption criteria included provision for recent major champions, winners of major amateur events, and leading players in the Women's World Golf Rankings.

The USGA accepted 1,897 entries for the championship.

=== Exemptions ===
This list details the exemption criteria for the 2024 U.S. Women's Open and the players exempt. Many players were exempt in multiple categories. (Note: (a) – denotes amateur)

1. Winners of the U.S. Women's Open for the last 10 years (2014–2023)

- Chun In-gee (7,17)
- Allisen Corpuz (2,10,17)
- Ariya Jutanugarn (10,17)
- Kim A-lim (17)
- Brittany Lang
- Minjee Lee (8,10,11,17)
- Lee Jeong-eun
- Yuka Saso (10,17)
- Park Sung-hyun and Michelle Wie West did not play

2. From the 2023 U.S. Women's Open, the 10 lowest scorers and anyone tying for 10th place

- Ayaka Furue (10,16,17)
- Nasa Hataoka (10,17)
- Charley Hull (10,17)
- Kim Hyo-joo (10,11,17)
- Ryu Hae-ran (10,11,17)
- Jiyai Shin (17)
- Maja Stark (10,17)
- Bailey Tardy (11,16)
- Rose Zhang (10,17)

3. Winner of the 2023 U.S. Senior Women's Open

- Trish Johnson did not play

4. Winner of the 2023 U.S. Women's Amateur

- Megan Schofill (a)

5. Winners of the 2023 U.S. Girls' Junior and U.S. Women's Mid-Amateur and the 2023 U.S. Women's Amateur runner-up (must be an amateur)

- Kimberly Dinh (a)
- Kiara Romero (a)
- Latanna Stone (a)

6. Winners of the Chevron Championship (2020–2024)

- Nelly Korda (7,10,11,16,17)
- Jennifer Kupcho (17)
- Patty Tavatanakit (11,16,17)
- Mirim Lee and Lilia Vu (9,10,11,17) did not play

7. Winners of the Women's PGA Championship (2019–2023)

- Hannah Green (10,11,16,17)
- Kim Sei-young (17)
- Yin Ruoning (10,17)

8. Winners of The Evian Championship (2019–2023)

- Céline Boutier (10,11,16,17)
- Brooke Henderson (10,16,17)
- Ko Jin-young (10,17)

9. Winners of the Women’s British Open (2019–2023)

- Ashleigh Buhai (10,17)
- Anna Nordqvist (17)
- Sophia Popov
- Hinako Shibuno

10. The top 30 point leaders from the 2023 LPGA Race to the CME Globe Final Points.

- Carlota Ciganda (17)
- Linn Grant (11,17)
- Georgia Hall (17)
- Megan Khang (11,17)
- Cheyenne Knight (17)
- Alison Lee (17)
- Lin Xiyu (17)
- Leona Maguire (17)
- Atthaya Thitikul (17)
- Amy Yang (11,17)
- Angel Yin (11,17)

11. Winners of individual LPGA co-sponsored events, whose victories were considered official, from the conclusion of the 2023 U.S. Women's Open to the initiation of the 2024 U.S. Women's Open (only events that awarded a full point allocation for the Race to the CME Globe)

- Mone Inami
- Lydia Ko (16,17)
- Alexa Pano
- Chanettee Wannasaen (17)

12. Winner of the 2024 Augusta National Women's Amateur (must be an amateur)

- Lottie Woad (a)

13. Winner of the 2023 Women's Amateur Championship (must be an amateur)

- Chiara Horder (a)

14. Winner of the 2023 Mark H. McCormack Medal (No. 1 in World Amateur Golf Ranking; must be an amateur)

- Ingrid Lindblad (a)

15. Winner of the 2024 NCAA Division I Individual Golf Championship (must be an amateur)

- Adéla Cernousek (a) (Note: already in field via qualifying)

16. From the 2024 Race to CME Globe, the top 10 point leaders as of April 3, 2024

- Lee Mi-hyang (17)
- Sarah Schmelzel (17)

17. From the current Women's World Golf Rankings, the top 75 players and anyone tying for 75th place as of April 3, 2024

- Aditi Ashok
- Choi Hye-jin
- Gemma Dryburgh
- Jodi Ewart Shadoff
- Ally Ewing
- Alexandra Försterling
- Im Jin-hee
- Akie Iwai
- Chisato Iwai
- Sora Kamiya
- Danielle Kang
- Kim Su-ji
- Kim Min-byeol
- Sakura Koiwai
- Andrea Lee
- Lee So-mi
- Gaby López
- Yuna Nishimura
- Ryann O'Toole
- Park Hyun-kyung
- Madelene Sagström
- Mao Saigo
- Kokona Sakurai
- Jenny Shin
- Ai Suzuki
- Lexi Thompson
- Albane Valenzuela
- Miyū Yamashita
- Bang Shin-sil, Hwang You-min, Lee Da-yeon, Lee Ye-won, Park Ji-young, Park Min-ji did not play.

18. From the current Women's World Golf Rankings, the top 75 players and anyone tying for 75th place as of May 27, 2024 (if not previously exempt)

- Lauren Coughlin
- Esther Henseleit
- Gabriela Ruffels
- Rio Takeda

19. Special exemptions

- None

=== Qualifying ===
Qualifying took place April 15 to May 20, 2024, via 36-hole stroke-play qualifiers at 26 different sites, 23 of them in the United States and one each in Germany, Canada and Japan.

Date	Location	Venue	Field	Spots	Qualifiers
Apr 15	Coquitlam, British Columbia	The Vancouver Golf Club	46	2	Amelia Garvey, Madison Young
Apr 15	El Macero, California	El Macero Country Club	72	3	Megha Ganne (a), Sabrina Iqbal (a), Alexa Melton
Apr 16	Waikoloa Village, Hawaii	The Village Course at Waikoloa	35	1	Yuka Nii
Apr 22	Chiba Prefecture, Japan	Boso Country Club	121	5	Saiki Fujita, Yui Kawamoto, Ayako Kimura, Amiyu Ozeki, Peiying Tsai
Apr 23	San Jacinto, California	Soboba Springs Golf Course	77	2	Mariel Galdiano, Hsin-Yu Lu
Apr 25	Alexandria, Virginia	Belle Haven Country Club	69	2	Ruixin Liu, Jean Reynolds
Apr 29	Ojai, California	Soule Park Golf Course	74	3	Joo Soo-bin, Catherine Park (a), Yuri Yoshida
Apr 29	Rockwall, Texas	Rockwall Golf & Athletic Club	78	2	Áine Donegan (a), Hsu Huai-Chien (a)
Apr 30	Westminster, Colorado	Walnut Creek Golf Preserve	71	3	Celine Borge, Isi Gabsa, Moriya Jutanugarn
Apr 30	Greensboro, North Carolina	Starmount Forest Country Club	72	2	Pauline Roussin, Lauren Stephenson
Apr 30	Seattle, Washington	Rainier Golf & Country Club	71	3	Caroline Inglis, Jeon Ji-won, Emily Kristine Pedersen
May 1	Winchester, Massachusetts	Winchester Country Club	60	3	Sofia García, Katie Li (a), Lucy Li
May 2	Columbus, Ohio	Ohio State University Golf Club	71	3	Isabella Fierro, Hsu Wei-ling, Wichanee Meechai
May 6	Scottsdale, Arizona	Pinnacle Peak Country Club	72	3	Kim Kaufman, Alana Uriell, Savannah Vilaubi
May 6	Fresno, California	San Joaquin Country Club	64	2	Gabriela Ruffels, Asterisk Talley (a)
May 6	New Smyrna Beach, Florida	Sugar Mill Country Club	49	2	Stephanie Kyriacou, Elizabeth Szokol
May 6	Dunwoody, Georgia	Dunwoody Country Club	43	2	Arpichaya Yubol, Kristen Gillman
May 6	Wayzata, Minnesota	Woodhill Country Club	33	1	Kaitlyn Papp Budde
May 7	Pittsburgh, Pennsylvania	Shannopin Country Club	54	2	Rachel Rohanna, Marissa Steen
May 8	St. Louis, Missouri	Sunset Country Club	36	1	Samantha Brown (a)
May 10	Jupiter, Florida	The Club at Admirals Cove	56	2	Maisie Filler (a), Sydnee Michaels
May 13	Bradenton, Florida	Bradenton Country Club	64	2	Pimpisa Sisutham (a), Amelie Zalsman (a)
May 13	Deerfield, Illinois	Briarwood Country Club	65	2	Keeley Marx (a), Caroline Smith (a)
May 13	Haworth, New Jersey	Haworth Country Club	69	4	Maude-Aimée LeBlanc, Liu Yan, Nanna Koerstz Madsen, Caroline Masson
May 13	Pearland, Texas	Golfcrest Country Club	74	2	Adéla Cernousek (a), Elina Sinz (a)
May 20	Michendorf, Germany	Golf & Country Club Seddiner See		3	Casandra Alexander, Pia Babnik, Mariajo Uribe

==== Alternates who gained entry ====
The following players gained a place in the field having finished as the leading alternates in the specified final qualifying events:

- Harriet Lynch (Fresno)
- Sarah Kemp (New Smyrna Beach)
- Agathe Laisné (Columbus)
- Amelia Lewis (Winchester)
- ~~Stephanie Meadow~~
- Yealimi Noh (Seattle)
- An Na-rin (Haworth)
- Junia Gabasa (a) (Pearland)
- Ssu-Chia Cheng (Seattle)
- Julia Misemer (a) (El Macero)

== Round summaries ==
=== First round ===
Thursday, May 30, 2024

Tee times were assigned to 134 professionals and 22 amateurs. Only four players scored under par for the round, led by Yuka Saso at −2. The scoring average for the round was 75.2, more than five strokes over par. The top-10 players in the Women's World Golf Rankings averaged 75.5, including a round of 80 by top-ranked Nelly Korda, who scored a septuple bogey on her third hole (the par-3, 12th hole). Three amateurs made the top-10 including 15-year-old Asterisk Talley.

Place	Player	Score	To par
1	(Japan) Yuka Saso	68	−2
T2	(France) Adéla Cernousek (a)	69	−1
T2	(United States) Andrea Lee	69	−1
T2	(Thailand) Wichanee Meechai	69	−1
T5	(Slovenia) Pia Babnik	70	E
T5	(Germany) Alexandra Försterling	70	E
T5	(Japan) Chisato Iwai	70	E
T5	(South Korea) Kim Sei-young	70	E
T5	(Australia) Minjee Lee	70	E
T5	(United States) Catherine Park (a)	70	E
T5	(United States) Megan Schofill (a)	70	E
T5	(South Korea) Jenny Shin	70	E
T5	(United States) Asterisk Talley (a)	70	E
T5	(Japan) Yuri Yoshida	70	E

=== Second round ===
Friday, May 31, 2024

Place	Player	Score	To par
1	(Thailand) Wichanee Meechai	69-67=136	−4
2	(United States) Andrea Lee	69-69=138	−2
T3	(Australia) Minjee Lee	70-69=139	−1
T3	(Japan) Yuka Saso	68-71=139	−1
T5	(Chinese Taipei) Hsu Wei-ling	72-69=141	+1
T5	(South Korea) Im Jin-hee	73-68=141	+1
T5	(Japan) Chisato Iwai	70-71=141	+1
T5	(Japan) Sakura Koiwai	72-69=141	+1
T5	(South Korea) Lee Mi-hyang	74-67=141	+1
T5	(United States) Megan Schofill (a)	70-71=141	+1
T5	(Japan) Hinako Shibuno	71-70=141	+1
T5	(United States) Asterisk Talley (a)	70-71=141	+1

=== Third round ===
Saturday, June 1, 2024

71 professionals and 4 amateurs survived Friday's cut in order to play the weekend.

Place	Player	Score	To par
T1	(United States) Andrea Lee	69-69-67=205	−5
T1	(Australia) Minjee Lee	70-69-66=205	−5
T1	(Thailand) Wichanee Meechai	69-67-69=205	−5
4	(Japan) Hinako Shibuno	71-70-66=207	−3
5	(Japan) Yuka Saso	68-71-69=208	−2
T6	(South Korea) Im Jin-hee	73-68-70=211	+1
T6	(Japan) Sakura Koiwai	72-69-70=211	+1
T8	(South Korea) Lee Mi-hyang	74-67-71=212	+2
T8	(Japan) Rio Takeda	74-69-69=212	+2
T8	(Thailand) Arpichaya Yubol	72-72-68=212	+2

=== Final round ===
Sunday, June 2, 2024

Champion
Low amateurs
(a) = amateur
(c) = past champion

Place	Player	Score	To par	Money ($)
1	(Japan) Yuka Saso (c)	68-71-69-68=276	−4	2,400,000
2	(Japan) Hinako Shibuno	71-70-66-72=279	−1	1,296,000
T3	(United States) Ally Ewing	74-72-68-66=280	E	664,778
T3	(United States) Andrea Lee	69-69-67-75=280	E	664,778
5	(Thailand) Arpichaya Yubol	72-72-68-69=281	+1	456,375
T6	(Japan) Ayaka Furue	71-72-71-68=282	+2	365,406
T6	(Thailand) Wichanee Meechai	69-67-69-77=282	+2	365,406
T6	(Thailand) Atthaya Thitikul	74-72-68-68=282	+2	365,406
T9	(Japan) Sakura Koiwai	72-69-70-72=283	+3	271,733
T9	(Australia) Minjee Lee (c)	70-69-66-78=283	+3	271,733
T9	(Japan) Rio Takeda	74-69-69-71=283	+3	271,733

Leaderboard below the top 10
Place	Player	Score	To par	Money ($)
T12	(South Korea) Im Jin-hee	73-68-70-73=284	+4	205,709
T12	(South Korea) Kim Hyo-joo	75-73-67-69=284	+4	205,709
T12	(Japan) Miyū Yamashita	72-71-70-71=284	+4	205,709
T12	(China) Yin Ruoning	73-71-69-71=284	+4	205,709
T16	(Australia) Hannah Green	76-71-72-66=285	+5	161,841
T16	(South Korea) Kim A-lim (c)	74-71-70-70=285	+5	161,841
T16	(South Korea) Lee Mi-hyang	74-67-71-73=285	+5	161,841
T19	(Spain) Carlota Ciganda	72-73-72-69=286	+6	125,829
T19	(England) Charley Hull	75-72-72-67=286	+6	125,829
T19	(Japan) Chisato Iwai	70-71-73-72=286	+6	125,829
T19	(China) Liu Yan	73-74-72-67=286	+6	125,829
T19	(South Korea) Jenny Shin	70-78-71-67=286	+6	125,829
T24	(Chinese Taipei) Hsu Wei-ling	72-69-74-72=287	+7	99,079
T24	(South Korea) Jeon Ji-won	75-71-71-70=287	+7	99,079
T26	(India) Aditi Ashok	73-71-73-71=288	+8	86,542
T26	(South Korea) Kim Min-byeol	72-71-70-75=288	+8	86,542
T26	(Germany) Sophia Popov	72-72-71-73=288	+8	86,542
T29	(Slovenia) Pia Babnik	70-77-72-70=289	+9	68,873
T29	(England) Jodi Ewart Shadoff	72-71-75-71=289	+9	68,873
T29	(Australia) Sarah Kemp	75-72-72-70=289	+9	68,873
T29	(South Korea) Kim Su-ji	73-73-70-73=289	+9	68,873
T29	(South Korea) Ko Jin-young	75-73-72-69=289	+9	68,873
T29	(China) Lin Xiyu	72-73-73-71=289	+9	68,873
T29	(Switzerland) Albane Valenzuela	72-71-76-70=289	+9	68,873
T36	(United States) Kristen Gillman	73-75-73-69=290	+10	54,338
T36	(Sweden) Anna Nordqvist	74-72-70-74=290	+10	54,338
T36	(Japan) Amiyu Ozeki	74-72-69-75=290	+10	54,338
T39	(Japan) Yui Kawamoto	71-71-73-76=291	+11	44,897
T39	(Mexico) Gaby López	75-72-73-71=291	+11	44,897
T39	(Japan) Yuna Nishimura	73-74-72-72=291	+11	44,897
T39	(South Korea) Park Hyun-kyung	74-73-74-70=291	+11	44,897
T39	(South Korea) Jiyai Shin	73-72-75-71=291	+11	44,897
T44	(United States) Mariel Galdiano	71-76-74-71=292	+12	34,495
T44	(Japan) Nasa Hataoka	73-70-74-75=292	+12	34,495
T44	(United States) Megan Khang	75-73-74-70=292	+12	34,495
T44	(United States) Alison Lee	78-70-72-72=292	+12	34,495
T44	(United States) Catherine Park (a)	70-72-72-78=292	+12	0
T44	(United States) Megan Schofill (a)	70-71-77-74=292	+12	0
T44	(United States) Asterisk Talley (a)	70-71-78-73=292	+12	0
T51	(South Africa) Ashleigh Buhai	74-73-71-75=293	+13	26,595
T51	(Germany) Alexandra Försterling	70-78-71-74=293	+13	26,595
T51	(Paraguay) Sofia García	75-73-71-74=293	+13	26,595
T51	(United States) Danielle Kang	74-69-76-74=293	+13	26,595
T51	(Australia) Gabriela Ruffels	75-73-75-70=293	+13	26,595
T51	(South Korea) Ryu Hae-ran	77-71-73-72=293	+13	26,595
T51	(Japan) Yuri Yoshida	70-74-75-74=293	+13	26,595
T58	(South Korea) An Na-rin	74-72-77-71=294	+14	23,741
T58	(France) Céline Boutier	72-75-75-72=294	+14	23,741
T58	(New Zealand) Amelia Garvey	76-71-74-73=294	+14	23,741
T58	(United States) Kim Kaufman	76-72-70-76=294	+14	23,741
T58	(Canada) Maude-Aimée LeBlanc	71-75-73-75=294	+14	23,741
T58	(South Korea) Lee Jeong-eun (c)	75-71-70-78=294	+14	23,741
T58	(United States) Alexa Pano	76-72-72-74=294	+14	23,741
T58	(Denmark) Emily Kristine Pedersen	75-73-72-74=294	+14	23,741
T58	(United States) Alana Uriell	76-72-72-74=294	+14	23,741
T67	(France) Adéla Cernousek (a)	69-79-69-78=295	+15	0
T67	(Japan) Ai Suzuki	72-70-73-80=295	+15	22,566
T69	(United States) Caroline Inglis	74-74-76-72=296	+16	22,095
T69	(Sweden) Madelene Sagström	73-75-73-75=296	+16	22,095
T69	(United States) Marissa Steen	73-74-74-75=296	+16	22,095
72	(South Africa) Casandra Alexander	71-74-77-75=297	+17	21,625
73	(Germany) Isi Gabsa	73-74-74-78=299	+19	21,390
74	(Japan) Akie Iwai	75-71-76-79=301	+21	21,155
75	(United States) Cheyenne Knight	75-71-75-81=302	+22	20,920
CUT	(United States) Megha Ganne (a)	76-73=149	+9	
CUT	(Sweden) Linn Grant	72-77=149	+9	
CUT	(South Korea) Joo Soo-bin	71-78=149	+9	
CUT	(Thailand) Moriya Jutanugarn	74-75=149	+9	
CUT	(United States) Brittany Lang (c)	74-75=149	+9	
CUT	(Japan) Mao Saigo	75-74=149	+9	
CUT	(Japan) Kokona Sakurai	75-74=149	+9	
CUT	(Chinese Taipei) Ssu-Chia Cheng	76-74=150	+10	
CUT	(United States) Lauren Coughlin	75-75=150	+10	
CUT	(Scotland) Gemma Dryburgh	77-73=150	+10	
CUT	(Chinese Taipei) Hsu Huai-Chien (a)	74-76=150	+10	
CUT	(Thailand) Ariya Jutanugarn (c)	75-75=150	+10	
CUT	(United States) Nelly Korda	80-70=150	+10	
CUT	(South Korea) Lee So-mi	74-76=150	+10	
CUT	(United States) Katie Li (a)	73-77=150	+10	
CUT	(Republic of Ireland) Leona Maguire	73-77=150	+10	
CUT	(United States) Kaitlyn Papp	79-71=150	+10	
CUT	(United States) Latanna Stone (a)	76-74=150	+10	
CUT	(Chinese Taipei) Tsai Pei-ying	74-76=150	+10	
CUT	(South Korea) Amy Yang	77-73=150	+10	
CUT	(United States) Angel Yin	75-75=150	+10	
CUT	(England) Georgia Hall	77-74=151	+11	
CUT	(Germany) Esther Henseleit	74-77=151	+11	
CUT	(Sweden) Ingrid Lindblad (a)	77-74=151	+11	
CUT	(United States) Sarah Schmelzel	77-74=151	+11	
CUT	(United States) Elizabeth Szokol	73-78=151	+11	
CUT	(United States) Bailey Tardy	75-76=151	+11	
CUT	(Thailand) Chanettee Wannasaen	73-78=151	+11	
CUT	(United States) Rose Zhang	79-72=151	+11	
CUT	(South Korea) Chun In-gee (c)	75-77=152	+12	
CUT	(United States) Allisen Corpuz (c)	75-77=152	+12	
CUT	(Canada) Brooke Henderson	80-72=152	+12	
CUT	(United States) Jennifer Kupcho	77-75=152	+12	
CUT	(United States) Ryann O'Toole	75-77=152	+12	
CUT	(England) Lottie Woad (a)	77-75=152	+12	
CUT	(Norway) Celine Borge	76-77=153	+13	
CUT	(Japan) Saiki Fujita	77-76=153	+13	
CUT	(Japan) Mone Inami	78-75=153	+13	
CUT	(New Zealand) Lydia Ko	80-73=153	+13	
CUT	(Australia) Stephanie Kyriacou	77-76=153	+13	
CUT	(United States) Rachel Rohanna	76-77=153	+13	
CUT	(Sweden) Maja Stark	76-77=153	+13	
CUT	(United States) Lauren Stephenson	77-76=153	+13	
CUT	(Thailand) Patty Tavatanakit	76-77=153	+13	
CUT	(United States) Lexi Thompson	78-75=153	+13	
CUT	(United States) Madison Young	78-75=153	+13	
CUT	(South Korea) Choi Hye-jin	75-79=154	+14	
CUT	(Mexico) Isabella Fierro	82-72=154	+14	
CUT	(Japan) Sora Kamiya	77-77=154	+14	
CUT	(France) Agathe Laisné	80-74=154	+14	
CUT	(Denmark) Nanna Koerstz Madsen	74-80=154	+14	
CUT	(Germany) Caroline Masson	75-79=154	+14	
CUT	(United States) Yealimi Noh	76-78=154	+14	
CUT	(United States) Kiara Romero (a)	75-79=154	+14	
CUT	(United States) Elina Sinz	76-78=154	+14	
CUT	(United States) Amelia Lewis	79-76=155	+15	
CUT	(United States) Lucy Li	77-79=156	+16	
CUT	(China) Ruixin Liu	76-80=156	+16	
CUT	(Thailand) Pimpisa Sisutham (a)	77-79=156	+16	
CUT	(Japan) Ayako Kimura	80-77=157	+17	
CUT	(Chinese Taipei) Lu Hsin-yu	76-81=157	+17	
CUT	(Australia) Keeley Marx (a)	76-81=157	+17	
CUT	(France) Pauline Roussin	80-77=157	+17	
CUT	(Republic of Ireland) Áine Donegan (a)	76-83=159	+19	
CUT	(Japan) Yuka Nii	81-78=159	+19	
CUT	(United States) Jean Reynolds	79-80=159	+19	
CUT	(United States) Savannah Vilaubi	88-71=159	+19	
CUT	(United States) Amelie Zalsman (a)	75-84=159	+19	
CUT	(United States) Maisie Filler (a)	79-81=160	+20	
CUT	(United States) Caroline Smith (a)	80-80=160	+20	
CUT	(United States) Alexa Melton	80-81=161	+21	
CUT	(United States) Sydnee Michaels	83-78=161	+21	
CUT	(United States) Samantha Brown (a)	85-77=162	+22	
CUT	(Germany) Chiara Horder (a)	85-77=162	+22	
CUT	(Colombia) Mariajo Uribe	83-79=162	+22	
CUT	(United States) Kimberly Dinh (a)	82-82=164	+24	
CUT	(United States) Harriet Lynch	84-81=165	+25	
CUT	(Philippines) Junia Gabasa (a)	85-81=166	+26	
CUT	(United States) Julia Misemer (a)	84-82=166	+26	
CUT	(United States) Sabrina Iqbal	86-83=169	+29	
WD	(South Korea) Kim Sei-young (Note: Kim withdrew during her round on Friday due to a back injury.)	70	E	

==== Scorecard ====
Final round

Hole	1	2	3	4	5	6	7	8	9	10	11	12	13	14	15	16	17	18
Par	4	4	4	4	4	3	5	3	4	4	4	3	5	4	4	4	3	4
(Japan) Saso	−2	−3	−3	−3	−3	−1	−1	−1	−1	−1	−1	−2	−3	−3	−4	−5	−4	−4
(Japan) Shibuno	−3	−3	−2	−1	−1	−1	−2	−1	−1	E	E	−1	−1	−1	−1	−1	−1	−1
(United States) Ewing	+4	+4	+4	+4	+4	+4	+4	+4	+3	+3	+2	+2	+1	+1	+1	E	E	E
(United States) An.Lee	−4	−4	−4	−2	−2	−2	−2	−1	−1	−1	−1	−2	−2	−2	−2	−2	−1	E
(Thailand) Yubol	+1	+1	+1	E	E	+1	+1	E	E	−1	−1	−1	−1	−1	−1	E	+1	+1
(Thailand) Meechai	−4	−3	−3	−3	−3	E	E	E	E	+1	+2	+2	+2	+2	+2	+1	+2	+2
(Australia) Lee	−6	−6	−5	−5	−5	−4	−4	−4	−3	−2	−2	E	E	+2	+3	+3	+3	+3

Cumulative tournament scores, relative to par

Birdie	Bogey	Double bogey	Triple bogey+
