= 2023 Evian Championship =

Tournament information
- Dates: 27–30 July 2023
- Location: Évian-les-Bains, France; 46.394°N 6.570°E
- Course: Evian Resort Golf Club
- Tours: Ladies European Tour; LPGA Tour

Statistics
- Par: 71
- Length: 6,333 yards (5,791 m)
- Field: 132 players, 70 after cut
- Cut: 146 (+4)
- Prize fund: $6,500,000
- Winner's share: $1,000,000

Champion
- (France) Céline Boutier
- 270 (−14)

Location map
- Location in France Location in Auvergne-Rhône-Alpes

The 2023 Evian Championship was played 27–30 July at the Evian Resort Golf Club in Évian-les-Bains, France. It was the 29th Evian Championship (the first 20 played as the Evian Masters), and the tenth as a major championship on the LPGA Tour. The event was televised by Golf Channel in the United States and Sky Sports in the United Kingdom.

== Course ==
Hole	1	2	3	4	5	6	7	8	9	Out	10	11	12	13	14	15	16	17	18	In	Total
Par	4	3	4	4	3	4	5	3	5	35	4	4	4	4	3	5	3	4	5	36	71
Yards	402	155	340	393	178	390	536	175	520	3089	404	364	390	416	210	506	168	331	455	3244	6333
Metres	368	142	311	359	163	357	490	160	475	2825	369	333	357	380	192	463	154	303	416	2967	5792

== Field ==
The field for the tournament was set at 132, and most earned exemptions based on past performance on the Ladies European Tour, the LPGA Tour, or with a high ranking in the Women's World Golf Rankings.

These were the exemption categories for the 2023 Evian Championship.

1. Evian invitations (six)

- Huang Ting-hsuan (a)
- Rachel Kuehn (a)
- Ines Laklalech
- Morgane Métraux
- Pauline Roussin
- Kaitlyn Schroeder (a)

2. Top 50 from Women's World Golf Rankings

- Aditi Ashok
- Céline Boutier
- Ashleigh Buhai
- Choi Hye-jin
- Chun In-gee
- Carlota Ciganda
- Allisen Corpuz
- Jodi Ewart Shadoff
- Ally Ewing
- Ayaka Furue
- Hannah Green
- Linn Grant
- Georgia Hall
- Nasa Hataoka
- Brooke Henderson
- Charley Hull
- Chisato Iwai
- Danielle Kang
- Megan Khang
- Kim A-lim
- Kim Hyo-joo
- Kim Sei-young
- Kim Su-ji
- Cheyenne Knight
- Ko Jin-young
- Lydia Ko
- Nelly Korda
- Jennifer Kupcho
- Andrea Lee
- Minjee Lee
- Lee So-mi
- Lin Xiyu
- Leona Maguire
- Anna Nordqvist
- Park Min-ji
- Ryu Hae-ran
- Madelene Sagström
- Yuka Saso
- Jiyai Shin
- Maja Stark
- Atthaya Thitikul
- Lilia Vu
- Miyū Yamashita
- Amy Yang
- Angel Yin
- Yin Ruoning
- Rose Zhang

3. Past Evian Championship winners

- Angela Stanford

4. Top 10 and ties previous year Evian Championship

- Ryu So-yeon
- Mao Saigo
- Sophia Schubert

5. Majors winners

- Ariya Jutanugarn
- Lee Jeong-eun
- Pernilla Lindberg
- Park Sung-hyun
- Hinako Shibuno
- Patty Tavatanakit

6. LPGA Tournament winners

- Pajaree Anannarukarn
- Gemma Dryburgh
- Grace Kim
- Gaby López
- Paula Reto

7. LET Order of Merit

- Carmen Alonso
- Diksha Dagar
- Manon De Roey
- Johanna Gustavsson
- Céline Herbin
- Alice Hewson
- Lily May Humphreys
- Meghan MacLaren
- Chiara Noja
- Ana Peláez
- Magdalena Simmermacher
- Klára Spilková

8. Winner U.S. Women's Amateur

- Saki Baba (a)

9. Winner Women's Amateur Championship

- Chiara Horder (a)

10. Winner Women's Amateur Asia-Pacific Championship

- Eila Galitsky (a)

11. Winner Women's Amateur Latin America Championship

- Valentina Rossi (a)

12. LPGA Tour CME Globe points list (if needed to fill the field to 132)

- Marina Alex
- An Na-rin
- Jaravee Boonchant
- Celine Borge
- Matilda Castren
- Pei-Yun Chien
- Chella Choi
- Lauren Coughlin
- Daniela Darquea
- Karis Davidson
- Perrine Delacour
- Amanda Doherty
- Mina Harigae
- Lauren Hartlage
- Esther Henseleit
- Daniela Holmqvist
- Hsu Wei-ling
- Caroline Inglis
- Ji Eun-hee
- Joo Soo-bin
- Moriya Jutanugarn
- Minami Katsu
- Sarah Kemp
- Frida Kinhult
- Stephanie Kyriacou
- Alison Lee
- Lee Mi-hyang
- Min Lee
- Lucy Li
- Liu Yan
- Nanna Koerstz Madsen
- Stephanie Meadow
- Wichanee Meechai
- Yuna Nishimura
- Ryann O'Toole
- Emily Kristine Pedersen
- Mel Reid
- Sarah Schmelzel
- Jenny Shin
- Linnea Ström
- Thidapa Suwannapura
- Maddie Szeryk
- Elizabeth Szokol
- Emma Talley
- Bailey Tardy
- Albane Valenzuela
- Lindsey Weaver-Wright
- Yu Liu

== Round summaries ==
=== First round ===
Thursday, 27 July 2023

Place	Player	Score	To par
1	(South Africa) Paula Reto	64	−7
T2	(France) Céline Boutier	66	−5
T2	(New Zealand) Lydia Ko	66	−5
T2	(United States) Alison Lee	66	−5
T2	(Thailand) Wichanee Meechai	66	−5
T6	(Norway) Celine Borge	67	−4
T6	(United States) Ally Ewing	67	−4
T6	(Germany) Esther Henseleit	67	−4
T6	(South Korea) Ji Eun-hee	67	−4
T6	(South Korea) Kim A-lim	67	−4
T6	(South Korea) Kim Su-ji	67	−4
T6	(South Korea) Ryu Hae-ran	67	−4
T6	(Japan) Yuka Saso	67	−4
T6	(United States) Angel Yin	67	−4

=== Second round ===
Friday, 28 July 2023

Place	Player	Score	To par
1	(France) Céline Boutier	66-69=135	−7
T2	(Japan) Yuka Saso	67-69=136	−6
T2	(Thailand) Patty Tavatanakit	69-67=136	−6
T4	(Thailand) Nasa Hataoka	70-67=137	−5
T4	(United States) Alison Lee	66-71=137	−5
T4	(Mexico) Gaby López	69-68=137	−5
7	(South Korea) Ryu Hae-ran	67-71=138	−4
T8	(Norway) Celine Borge	67-72=139	−3
T8	(Chinese Taipei) Pei-Yun Chien	68-71=39	−3
T8	(Canada) Brooke Henderson	69-70=139	−3
T8	(South Africa) Paula Reto	64-75=139	−3

=== Third round ===
Saturday, 29 July 2023

Place	Player	Score	To par
1	(France) Céline Boutier	66-69-67=202	−11
2	(Japan) Nasa Hataoka	70-67-68=205	−8
T3	(Canada) Brooke Henderson	69-70-67=206	−7
T3	(Australia) Minjee Lee	69-71-66=206	−7
T5	(United States) Nelly Korda	70-73-64=207	−6
T5	(Japan) Yuka Saso	67-69-71=207	−6
T7	(South Korea) Kim A-lim	67-74-67=208	−5
T7	(United States) Alison Lee	66-71-71=208	−5
T9	(Norway) Celine Borge	67-72-70=209	−4
T9	(Scotland) Gemma Dryburgh	70-70-69=209	−4
T9	(Mexico) Gaby López	69-68-72=209	−4
T9	(United States) Lilia Vu	71-70-68=209	−4
T9	(United States) Angel Yin	67-76-66=209	−4

=== Final round ===
Sunday, 30 July 2023

Place	Player	Score	To par	Prize money (US$)
1	(France) Céline Boutier	66-69-67-68=270	−14	1,000,000
2	(Canada) Brooke Henderson	69-70-67-70=276	−8	585,967
T3	(Norway) Celine Borge	67-72-70-68=277	−7	283,278
T3	(Japan) Nasa Hataoka	70-67-68-72=277	−7	283,278
T3	(South Korea) Kim A-lim	67-74-67-69=277	−7	283,278
T3	(Mexico) Gaby López	69-68-72-68=277	−7	283,278
T3	(Japan) Yuka Saso	67-69-71-70=277	−7	283,278
8	(Scotland) Gemma Dryburgh	70-70-69-69=278	−6	158,805
T9	(United States) Megan Khang	70-73-70-66=279	−5	122,100
T9	(South Korea) Kim Su-ji	67-74-71-67=279	−5	122,100
T9	(United States) Nelly Korda	70-73-64-72=279	−5	122,100
T9	(Thailand) Atthaya Thitikul	69-75-70-65=279	−5	122,100
T9	(United States) Rose Zhang	69-71-71-68=279	−5	122,100
