= Korean Golf Tour =

Korean Golf Tour may refer to:

- Korean Tour, for men
- LPGA of Korea Tour, for women
