= 2020 LPGA of Korea Tour =

The 2020 LPGA of Korea Tour was the 43rd season of the LPGA of Korea Tour, the professional golf tour for women operated by the Korea Ladies Professional Golf' Association. The season began at Twin Doves Golf Club in Vietnam in December 2019.

== Schedule ==
The number in parentheses after winners' names show the player's total number wins in official money individual events on the LPGA of Korea Tour, including that event. A number of events were cancelled due to COVID-19 pandemic.

Dates	Tournament	Host city	Prize fund (KRW)	Winner	WWGR pts	Notes
6–8 Dec	Hyosung Championship	(Vietnam) Binh Duong	700,000,000	(South Korea) Lee Da-yeon (5)	18.0	
~~12–15 Mar~~	Taiwan Women's Golf Open	(Taiwan) Kaohsiung	US$800,000	Cancelled		Co-sanctioned with LPGA of Taiwan
~~9–12 Apr~~	Lotte Rent-a-Car Women's Open	(South Korea) Seogwipo	700,000,000	Cancelled		
~~17–19 Apr~~	Celltrion Queens Masters	(South Korea) Incheon	800,000,000	Cancelled		
~~24–26 Apr~~	Nexen Saint Nine Masters	(South Korea) Gimhae	600,000,000	Cancelled		
~~8–10 May~~	KyoChon Honey Ladies Open	(South Korea) TBC	600,000,000	Cancelled		
~~15–17 May~~	NH Investment & Securities Ladies Championship	(South Korea) Yongin	700,000,000	Cancelled		
14–17 May; ~~30 Apr – 3 May~~	**KLPGA Championship**	(South Korea) Yangju	3,000,000,000	(South Korea) Park Hyun-kyung (1)	24.0	
29–31 May	E1 Charity Open	(South Korea) Icheon	800,000,000	(South Korea) Lee So-young (5)	22.0	
~~20–24 May~~	Doosan Match Play Championship	(South Korea) Chuncheon	800,000,000	Cancelled		
5–7 Jun	Lotte Cantata Ladies Open	(South Korea) Seogwipo	800,000,000	(South Korea) Kim Hyo-joo (11)	26.0	
12–14 Jun	S-Oil Championship	(South Korea) Jeju	800,000,000	(South Korea) Choi Hye-jin (10)	–	
18–21 Jun	**Kia Motors Korea Women's Open Championship**	(South Korea) Incheon	1,000,000,000	(South Korea) Ryu So-yeon (10)	28.0	
25–28 Jun	BC Card Ladies Cup	(South Korea) Pocheon	700,000,000	(South Korea) Kim Ji-yeong (2)	19.5	
3–5 Jul	Ilhwa McCol Open at Yongpyong Resort	(South Korea) Pyeongchang	600,000,000	(South Korea) Kim Min-sun (5)	19.5	
10–12 Jul	IS Dongseo Busan Open	(South Korea) Busan	1,000,000,000	(South Korea) Park Hyun-kyung (2)	24.0	
17–19 Jul	MY Munyoung Queens Park Championship	(South Korea) Yeoju	600,000,000	Cancelled		
30 Jul – 2 Aug	Jeju Samdasoo Masters	(South Korea) TBC	800,000,000	(South Korea) Ryu Hae-ran (2)	28.0	
14–16 Aug	Dayouwinia MBN Ladies Open	(South Korea) Pocheon	700,000,000	(South Korea) Park Min-ji (4)	24.0	
~~20–23 Aug~~	High1 Resort Ladies Open	(South Korea) Jeongseon	800,000,000	Cancelled		
~~27–30 Aug~~	**Hanwha Classic**	(South Korea) Chuncheon	1,400,000,000	Cancelled		
~~4–6 Sep~~	KG Edaily Ladies Open	(South Korea) Yongin	600,000,000	Cancelled		
~~10–13 Sep~~	All for You Renoma Championship	(South Korea) Icheon	800,000,000	Cancelled		
~~18–20 Sep~~	OK! Savings Bank Se Ri Pak Invitational	(South Korea) TBC	800,000,000	Cancelled		
25–27 Sep	Fantom Classic	(South Korea) Yeongam	600,000,000	(South Korea) Ahn Song-yi (2)	20.5	
8–11 Oct	Autech Carrier Championship	(South Korea) Yeongi	800,000,000	(South Korea) An Na-rin (1)	24.0	
15–18 Oct	**KB Financial Group Star Championship**	(South Korea) Icheon	1,000,000,000	(South Korea) Kim Hyo-joo (12)	24.0	
~~22–25 Oct~~	BMW Ladies Championship	(South Korea) Busan	US$2,000.000	Cancelled		Co-sanctioned with LPGA Tour
22–25 Oct	HUENCARE Ladies Open	(South Korea) Yeongam	800,000,000	(South Korea) Lee So-mi (1)	19.5	
29 Oct – 1 Nov	SK Networks Seokyung Ladies Classic	(South Korea) Seogwipo	800,000,000	(South Korea) Jang Ha-na (13)	20.5	
6–8 Nov	Hana Financial Group Championship	(South Korea) Incheon	1,000,000,000	(South Korea) An Na-rin (2)	24.0	
13–15 Nov	SK Telecom–ADT CAPS Championship	(South Korea) TBC	600,000,000	(South Korea) Choi Hye-jin (11)	20.5	

Events in bold are majors.
