= Lee Dong-eun (golfer) =

South Korean professional golfer (born 2004)

Personal information
- Nationality: South Korea
- Born: 23 November 2004 (age 21)

Career
- Sport: Golf
- Turned professional: 2024
- Current tours: LPGA of Korea Tour; LPGA Tour
- Former tour: KLPGA Dream Tour
- Professional wins: 2

Number of wins by tour
- LPGA of Korea Tour: 1
- Other: 1

Best results in LPGA major championships
- Chevron Championship: DNP
- Women's PGA C'ship: T19: 2026
- U.S. Women's Open: DNP
- Women's British Open: CUT: 2005
- Evian Championship: DNP

Lee Dong-eun (born 23 November 2004) is a South Korean professional golfer.

Lee turned professional in 2023. In her second year as a professional, in June 2025, Lee won her first LPGA of Korea Tour event, the DB Group Korea Women's Open Golf Championship. That year, she ranked first in driving distance on the KLPGA Tour, with an average drive of 261.1 yards.

Lee earned her LPGA Tour card for 2026 by finishing T-7 at the LPGA Q-series.

In 2026, she made her LPGA Tour debut at the Blue Bay LPGA in China.

== Professional wins (2) ==
=== LPGA of Korea Tour wins (1) ===
- 2025 DB Group Korea Women's Open Golf Championship

=== KLPGA Dream Tour wins (1) ===
- 2023 NPHolding Dream Tour 15th Tournament
