= 2024 LPGA of Korea Tour =

Golf tour season

The 2024 LPGA of Korea Tour was the 47th season of the LPGA of Korea Tour, the professional golf tour for women operated by the Korea Ladies Professional Golf' Association.

== Schedule ==
Below is the schedule for the 2024 season. "Date" is the ending date for the tournament. The number in parentheses after winners' names show the player's total number wins in official money individual events on the LPGA of Korea Tour, including that event.

Date	Tournament	Prize fund (KRW)	Winner	WWGR pts	Notes
1 Mar	Hana Financial Group Singapore Women's Open	S$1,100,000	(South Korea) Kim Jae-hee (1)	18.5	Co-sanctioned with Ladies Asian Tour
17 Mar	Blue Canyon Ladies Championship	US$650,000	(South Korea) Lee Ye-won (4)	18.0	
7 Apr	Doosan E&C We've Championship	1,200,000,000	(South Korea) Hwang You-min (2)	18.5	
14 Apr	Mediheal Hankook Ilbo Championship	1,000,000,000	(South Korea) Park Ji-young (8)	18.5	
21 Apr	Nexen Saint Nine Masters	900,000,000	(South Korea) Choi Eun-woo (2)	16.5	
28 Apr	**CreaS F&C KLPGA Championship**	1,300,000,000	(South Korea) Lee Jung-min (3)	26.0	
5 May	Kyochon 1991 Ladies Open	800,000,000	(South Korea) Park Ji-young (9)	16.5	
12 May	NH Investment & Securities Ladies Championship	800,000,000	(South Korea) Lee Ye-won (5)	19.0	
19 May	Doosan Match Play Championship	900,000,000	(South Korea) Park Hyun-kyung (5)	16.5	
26 May	E1 Open	900,000,000	(South Korea) Bae So-hyun (1)	16.0	
2 Jun	Suhyup Bank – MBN Ladies Open	1,000,000,000	(South Korea) Lee Ye-won (6)	16.5	
9 Jun	Celltrion Queens Masters	1,200,000,000	(South Korea) Park Min-ji (19)	18.5	
16 Jun	**DB Group Korea Women's Open Golf Championship**	1,200,000,000	(South Korea) Ro Seung-hui (1)	26.0	Co-sanctioned with Ladies Asian Tour
23 Jun	BC Card-Hankyung Ladies Cup	1,400,000,000	(South Korea) Park Hyun-kyung (6)	19.0	
30 Jun	McCol-Mona Park Yongpyong Open	800,000,000	(South Korea) Park Hyun-kyung (7)	17.5	
7 Jul	Lotte Open	1,200,000,000	(South Korea) Lee Ga-young (2)	19.0	
14 Jul	High1 Resort Ladies Open	1,000,000,000	(South Korea) Ko Ji-u (2)	16.0	
4 Aug	Jeju Samdasoo Masters	1,000,000,000	(South Korea) Yoon Ina (2)	19.0	
18 Aug	Heaven Masters	1,000,000,000	(South Korea) Bae So-hyun (2)	19.0	
25 Aug	**Hanwha Championship**	1,700,000,000	(South Korea) Park Ji-young (10)	19.0	
1 Sep	KG Ladies Open	800,000,000	(South Korea) Bae So-hyun (3)	19.0	
8 Sep	**KB Financial Group Star Championship**	1,200,000,000	(South Korea) Yoo Hyun-jo (1)	19.5	
15 Sep	OK Savings Bank-OK Man Ladies Open	800,000,000	(South Korea) Ro Seung-hui (2)	18.0	
22 Sep	Daebo HausD Open	1,000,000,000	(South Korea) Moon Jeong-min (1)	18.0	
29 Sep	Hana Financial Group Championship	1,500,000,000	(South Korea) Ma Da-som (2)	20.5	Co-sanctioned with Ladies Asian Tour
6 Oct	**Hite Championship**	1,500,000,000	(South Korea) Kim Su-ji (6)	19.0	
13 Oct	Dongbu Construction-Koreit Championship	1,000,000,000	(South Korea) Kim Min-byeol (1)	18.5	
20 Oct	Sangsangin·Hankyung TV Open	1,200,000,000	(South Korea) Park Bo-kyeom (2)	19.0	
27 Oct	Dukshin EPC-Seoul Economics Ladies Classic	1,000,000,000	(South Korea) Ji Han-sol (4)	19.0	
3 Nov	S-Oil Championship	900,000,000	(South Korea) Ma Da-som (3)	18.0	
10 Nov	SK Shieldus-SK Telecom Championship	1,000,000,000	(South Korea) Ma Da-som (4)	18.5	

Events in bold are majors.
