= 2025 LPGA of Korea Tour =

Golf tour season

The 2025 LPGA of Korea Tour was the 48th season of the LPGA of Korea Tour, the professional golf tour for women operated by the Korea Ladies Professional Golf' Association.

== Schedule ==
Below is the schedule for the 2025 season. "Date" is the ending date for the tournament. The number in parentheses after winners' names show the player's total number wins in official money individual events on the LPGA of Korea Tour, including that event.

Date	Tournament	Prize fund (KRW)	Winner	WWGR pts	Notes
16 Mar	Blue Canyon Ladies Championship	US$800,000	(South Korea) Park Bo-kyeom (3)	19.0	
6 Apr	Doosan E&C We've Championship	1,200,000,000	(South Korea) Lee Ye-won (7)	19.0	
13 Apr	IM Financial Group Open	1,000,000,000	(South Korea) Kim Min-ju (1)	19.0	
20 Apr	Nexen SaintNine Masters	900,000,000	(South Korea) Bang Shin-sil (3)	18.5	
27 Apr	DukshinEPC Championship	1,000,000,000	(South Korea) Kim Min-sun (1)	17.5	
4 May	**CreaS F&C KLPGA Championship**	1,300,000,000	(South Korea) Hong Jung-min (2)	26.0	
11 May	NH Investment & Securities Ladies Championship	1,000,000,000	(South Korea) Lee Ye-won (8)	18.5	
18 May	Doosan Match Play	1,000,000,000	(South Korea) Lee Ye-won (9)	18.5	
25 May	E1 Charity Open	900,000,000	(South Korea) Park Hyun-kyung (8)	17.0	
1 Jun	Suhyup Bank MBN Ladies Open	1,000,000,000	(South Korea) Jeong Yun-ji (2)	16.5	
8 Jun	Celltrion Queens Masters	1,200,000,000	(South Korea) Lee Ga-young (3)	18.5	
15 Jun	**DB Group Korea Women's Open Golf Championship**	1,200,000,000	(South Korea) Lee Dong-eun (1)	26.0	
22 Jun	The Heaven Masters	1,000,000,000	(South Korea) Ro Seung-hui (3)	17.0	
29 Jun	McCol-Mona Yongpyong Open	1,000,000,000	(South Korea) Ko Ji-u (3)	17.5	
6 Jul	Lotte Open	1,200,000,000	(South Korea) Park Hye-jun (1)	19.5	
13 Jul	High1 Resort Ladies Open	1,000,000,000	(South Korea) Bang Shin-sil (4)	18.0	
3 Aug	Aurora World Championship	1,000,000,000	(South Korea) Bae So-hyun (4)	16.5	
10 Aug	Jeju Samdasoo Masters	1,000,000,000	(South Korea) Ko Ji-won (1)	18.5	
17 Aug	Mediheal Hankook Ilbo Championship	1,000,000,000	(South Korea) Hong Jung-min (3)	19.0	
24 Aug	BC Card-Hankyung Ladies Cup	1,400,000,000	(South Korea) Kim Min-sol (1)	19.0	
31 Aug	KG Ladies Open	800,000,000	(South Korea) Shin Da-in (1)	18.0	
7 Sep	**KB Financial Star Championship**	1,500,000,000	(South Korea) Yoo Hyun-jo (2)	19.0	
14 Sep	OK Savings Bank OK Man Open	1,000,000,000	(South Korea) Bang Shin-sil (5)	16.5	
21 Sep	Hana Financial Group Championship	1,500,000,000	(South Korea) Lee Da-yeon (9)	20.5	
28 Sep	**Hite Championship**	1,500,000,000	(South Korea) Sung Yu-jin (4)	19.0	
4 Oct	Dongbu Construction-Koreit Championship	1,000,000,000	(South Korea) Kim Min-sol (2)	18.5	
12 Oct	K-Food Nolboo-Hwami Masters	1,200,000,000	(South Korea) Hong Jung-min (4)	19.0	
19 Oct	Sangsangin-Hankyung Wownet Open	1,200,000,000	(South Korea) Lee Yool-lyn (1)	19.0	
26 Oct	Happiness CC Open	1,000,000,000	(China) Li Shuying (a, 1)	19.0	
2 Nov	S-Oil Championship	1,000,000,000	(South Korea) Ko Ji-won (2)	19.0	
9 Nov	Daebo HausD Open	1,000,000,000	(South Korea) Hwang You-min (3)	19.0	

Events in bold are majors.
