= 2023 LPGA of Korea Tour =

The 2023 LPGA of Korea Tour is the 46th season of the LPGA of Korea Tour, the professional golf tour for women operated by the Korea Ladies Professional Golf' Association.

== Schedule ==
Below is the schedule for the 2023 season. "Date" is the ending date for the tournament. The number in parentheses after winners' names show the player's total number wins in official money individual events on the LPGA of Korea Tour, including that event.

Date	Tournament	Prize fund (KRW)	Winner	WWGR pts	Notes
9 Apr	Lotte Rent-a-Car Women's Open	800,000,000	(South Korea) Lee Ye-won (1)	16.0	
16 Apr	Mediheal Hankook Ilbo Championship	1,000,000,000	(South Korea) Lee Joo-mi (1)	19.5	
23 Apr	Nexen Saint Nine Masters	800,000,000	(South Korea) Choi Eun-woo (1)	18.0	
30 Apr	**Creas F&C KLPGA Championship**	1,300,000,000	(South Korea) Lee Da-yeon (7)	26.0	
7 May	Kyochon 1991 Ladies Open	800,000,000	(South Korea) Park Bo-kyeom (1)	16.5	
14 May	NH Investment & Securities Ladies Championship	800,000,000	(South Korea) Im Jin-hee (3)	19.0	
21 May	Doosan Match Play Championship	900,000,000	(South Korea) Sung Yu-jin (2)	17.5	
28 May	E1 Charity Open	800,000,000	(South Korea) Bang Shin-sil (1)	19.0	
4 Jun	Lotte Open	800,000,000	(South Korea) Choi Hye-jin (12)	19.0	
11 Jun	Celltrion Queens Masters	1,200,000,000	(South Korea) Park Min-ji (17)	19.0	
18 Jun	**DB Group Korea Women's Open Golf Championship**	1,200,000,000	(South Korea) Hong Ji-won (2)	26.0	
25 Jun	BC Card-Hankyung Ladies Cup	800,000,000	(South Korea) Park Min-ji (18)	18.5	
2 Jul	McCol-Mona YongPyong Open	800,000,000	(South Korea) Ko Ji-u (1)	16.5	
9 Jul	Dayou Winia – MBN Ladies Open	1,000,000,000	(South Korea) Hwang You-min (1)	17.5	
16 Jul	EverCollagen-The Sienna Queens Crown	800,000,000	(South Korea) Park Ji-young (6)	18.5	
6 Aug	Jeju Samdasoo Masters	1,000,000,000	(South Korea) Im Jin-hee (4)	19.0	
13 Aug	Doosan E&C We've Championship	1,200,000,000	(South Korea) Lee Ye-won (2)	19.0	
20 Aug	High1 Resort Ladies Open	800,000,000	(South Korea) Han Jin-seon (2)	18.5	
27 Aug	**Hanwha Classic**	1,700,000,000	(South Korea) Kim Su-ji (5)	19.5	
3 Sep	KG Ladies Open	800,000,000	(South Korea) Seo Yeun-jung (1)	17.5	
10 Sep	**KB Financial Star Championship**	1,200,000,000	(South Korea) Park Ji-young (7)	19.5	
17 Sep	OK Financial Group OK Man Open	800,000,000	(South Korea) Ma Da-som (1)	17.5	
24 Sep	Hana Financial Group Championship	1,500,000,000	(South Korea) Lee Da-yeon (8)	20.5	
1 Oct	Daebo HausD Open	1,000,000,000	(South Korea) Pak Ju-young (1)	19.0	
8 Oct	**Hite Championship**	1,200,000,000	(South Korea) Lee Ye-won (3)	19.0	
15 Oct	Dongbu Construction-Koreit Championship	1,000,000,000	(South Korea) Bang Shin-sil (2)	19.0	
22 Oct	Sangsangin-Hankyung TV Open	1,200,000,000	(South Korea) Im Jin-hee (5)	19.0	
29 Oct	SK Networks-Seoul Economics Ladies Classic	800,000,000	(South Korea) Park Hyun-kyung (4)	19.0	
5 Nov	S-Oil Championship	900,000,000	(South Korea) Sung Yu-jin (3)	19.0	
12 Nov	SK Shieldus-SK Telecom Championship	1,000,000,000	(South Korea) Im Jin-hee (6)	19.5	

Events in bold are majors.
