= Hwang You-min =

South Korean professional golfer (born 2003)

Personal information
- Nationality: South Korea
- Born: 17 April 2003 (age 23)

Career
- Sport: Golf
- Turned professional: 2022
- Current tour: LPGA of Korea Tour
- Professional wins: 5

Number of wins by tour
- LPGA Tour: 1
- LPGA of Korea Tour: 3
- Other: 1

Best results in LPGA major championships
- Chevron Championship: T12: 2026
- Women's PGA C'ship: T19: 2025
- U.S. Women's Open: T56: 2025
- Women's British Open: CUT: 2026
- Evian Championship: T49: 2025

Hwang You-min (Korean: 황유민; born 17 April 2003), also known as Youmin Hwang, is a South Korean professional golfer. Since turning professional, Hwang has won once on the LPGA Tour, three times on the LPGA of Korea Tour and once on the Taiwan LPGA Tour.

== Amateur career ==
As an amateur player, in 2021 Hwang won the 45th Korea Women's Amateur Golf Championship. The following week, she won the Bitgoeuljungheung Cup, rising to 14th place in the Women's Amateur Golf Ranking. Later that year, she placed in the top-10 of the Asia-Pacific Amateur Ladies Golf Team Championship.

== Professional career ==
Hwang turned professional in 2022, playing on the LPGA of Korea Tour. Her first tournament win came the following year, when she won the Dayou Winia – MBN Ladies Open on the 2023 LPGA of Korea Tour. On 7 April 2024, Hwang won the Doosan E&C We've Championship. In October, Hwang narrowly lost to Kim Su-ji in the 2024 KLPGA's Hite Jinro Championship.

In March 2025, Hwang won the 2025 Foxconn TLPGA Players Championship with a final score of 11-under-par. She was awarded the US$270,000 first prize. In May 2025, Hwang placed second in the LPGA of Korea tour's 17th Doosan Match Play final, losing to Lee Ye-won by four holes. Later that month, Hwang travelled to the United States to make her debut on the LPGA Tour. After being ranked among the top 75 women's golfers in the world on the Women's World Golf Rankings, Hwang earned a berth to play in the 2025 U.S. Women's Open. After the first round, Hwang was one of five golfers in T7 with 3-under-par. Hwang survived the cut after round 2.

== Amateur wins ==
- 2020 Maekyung Sollago Cup Amateur Golf Championship
- 2021 Korean Women's Amateur - KangMinKoo Cup, Bitgoeuljungheung Cup

== Professional wins (5) ==
=== LPGA Tour wins (1) ===
| No. | Date | Tournament | Winning score | Margin of victory | Runner(s)-up |
|---|---|---|---|---|---|
| 1 | 4 Oct 2025 | Lotte Championship | −17 (67-62-75-67=271) | 1 stroke | (South Korea) Kim Hyo-joo |

=== LPGA of Korea Tour wins (3) ===
- 2023 Dayou Winia – MBN Ladies Open
- 2024 Doosan E&C We've Championship
- 2025 Daebo HausD Open

=== Taiwan LPGA Tour wins (1) ===
- 2025 Foxconn TLPGA Players Championship

== Results in LPGA majors ==
| Tournament | 2024 | 2025 | 2026 |
|---|---|---|---|
| Chevron Championship | | | T12 |
| U.S. Women's Open | | T56 | CUT |
| Women's PGA Championship | | T19 | CUT |
| The Evian Championship | CUT | T49 | CUT |
| Women's British Open | | | CUT |

Did not play

CUT = missed the half-way cut
"T" = tied
