= Lotte Championship =

Women's golf tournament

Coordinates: 21.311°N 158.039°W

Tournament information
- Location: ʻEwa Beach, Hawaii, U.S.
- Established: 2012
- Course: Hoakalei Country Club
- Par: 72
- Length: 6,303 yards (5,763 m)
- Tour: LPGA Tour
- Format: Stroke play - 72 holes
- Prize fund: $3 million
- Month played: October

Tournament record score
- Aggregate: 260 Lydia Ko (2021)
- To par: −28 as above

Current champion
- (Thailand) Jeeno Thitikul

Location on Oahu, Hawaii, U.S.

The Lotte Championship is a women's professional golf tournament on the LPGA Tour. It debuted in April 2012 at the Ko Olina Golf Club in Kapolei, Hawaii.

The title sponsor of the tournament is Lotte, an industrial conglomerate based in South Korea and Japan. The presenting sponsor from 2012 to 2014 was J Golf, a Korean broadcaster. In 2012, the LPGA Lotte Championship was one of two LPGA tournaments in the United States presented by J Golf. From 2015 to 2018, the presenting sponsor was Hershey.

Ai Miyazato won the inaugural event in 2012 by four strokes for her eighth win on the LPGA Tour.

In 2022, the tournament moved to the Hoakalei Country Club in ʻEwa Beach, Hawaii.

To accommodate Korean television, the tournament begins on Wednesday and concludes on Saturday. In 2026, the tournament concluded on Sunday.

On October 5, 2026, the LPGA announced the tournament is moving to Kapalua Resort (Plantation Course) in Kapalua, Hawaii.

== Tournament names ==
- 2012–2014: LPGA Lotte Championship Presented by J Golf
- 2015: LPGA Lotte Championship Presented by Hershey
- 2016–2018: Lotte Championship Presented by Hershey
- 2019–2021: Lotte Championship
- 2022–2026: Lotte Championship Presented by Hoakalei

== Winners ==
Year	Date	Venue	Winner	Winning score	To par	Margin of victory	Runner(s)-up	Purse ($)	Winner's share ($)
2026	Oct 4	Hoakalei CC	(Thailand) Jeeno Thitikul	67-65-67-68=267	−21	3 strokes	(South Korea) Ina Yoon	3,000,000	450,000
2025	Oct 4	Hoakalei CC	(South Korea) Hwang You-min	67-62-75-67=271	−17	1 stroke	(South Korea) Kim Hyo-joo	3,000,000	450,000
2024	Nov 9	Hoakalei CC	(South Korea) Kim A-lim	66-69-67-68=270	−18	2 strokes	Nataliya Guseva	3,000,000	450,000
2023	Apr 15	Hoakalei CC	(Australia) Grace Kim	71-67-70-68=276	−12	Playoff	(China) Yu Liu (South Korea) Sung Yu-jin	2,000,000	300,000
2022	Apr 16	Hoakalei CC	(South Korea) Kim Hyo-joo	67-67-72-71=277	−11	2 strokes	(Japan) Hinako Shibuno	2,000,000	300,000
2021	Apr 17	Kapolei GC	(New Zealand) Lydia Ko	67-63-65-65=260	−28	7 strokes	(South Korea) Inbee Park (South Korea) Kim Sei-young (Republic of Ireland) Leona Maguire (United States) Nelly Korda	2,000,000	300,000
2020: Canceled due to COVID-19 pandemic
2019	Apr 20	Ko Olina GC	(Canada) Brooke Henderson (2)	65-68-69-70=272	−16	4 strokes	(South Korea) Ji Eun-hee	2,000,000	300,000
2018	Apr 14	Ko Olina GC	(Canada) Brooke Henderson	68-66-73-69=276	−12	4 strokes	(Spain) Azahara Muñoz	2,000,000	300,000
2017	Apr 15	Ko Olina GC	(United States) Cristie Kerr	71-69-62-66=268	−20	3 strokes	(South Korea) Chun In-gee (South Korea) Jang Su-yeon (New Zealand) Lydia Ko	2,000,000	300,000
2016	Apr 16	Ko Olina GC	(Australia) Minjee Lee	68-66-74-64=272	−16	1 stroke	(United States) Katie Burnett (South Korea) Chun In-gee	1,800,000	270,000
2015	Apr 18	Ko Olina GC	(South Korea) Kim Sei-young	67-67-70-73=277	−11	Playoff	(South Korea) Inbee Park	1,800,000	270,000
2014	Apr 19	Ko Olina GC	(United States) Michelle Wie	70-67-70-67=274	−14	2 strokes	(United States) Angela Stanford	1,700,000	255,000
2013	Apr 20	Ko Olina GC	(Norway) Suzann Pettersen	65-69-68-67=269	−19	Playoff	(United States) Lizette Salas	1,700,000	255,000
2012	Apr 21	Ko Olina GC	(Japan) Ai Miyazato	71-65-70-70=276	−12	4 strokes	(South Korea) Meena Lee (Spain) Azahara Muñoz	1,700,000	255,000

== Tournament records ==
Year	Player	Score	Round
2013	Lizette Salas	62 (−10)	4th
2017	Cristie Kerr	62 (−10)	3rd
2025	Hwang You-min	62 (−10)	2nd
