= Kim Su-ji (golfer) =

South Korean professional golfer (born 1996)

Personal information
- Nickname: Autumn Queen
- Nationality: South Korea
- Born: 16 October 1996 (age 30)

Career
- Sport: Golf
- Turned professional: 2017
- Current tour: LPGA of Korea Tour
- Professional wins: 6

Number of wins by tour
- LPGA of Korea Tour: 6

Best results in LPGA major championships
- Chevron Championship: DNP
- Women's PGA C'ship: CUT: 2025
- U.S. Women's Open: T29: 2024
- Women's British Open: DNP
- Evian Championship: T9: 2023

Kim Su-ji (Korean: 김수지, born 16 October 1996) is a South Korean professional golfer. Kim became a professional in 2017, joining the LPGA of Korea Tour. On tour, she has six wins, three of them majors. In Korea she is known as the "Autumn Queen" for recording a majority of her wins during the fall season.

== Biography ==
Kim joined the LPGA of Korea Tour in 2017. Kim remained on the tour for three years, but dropped out of the tour in 2020 after placing 84th in the rankings. After returning to the tour in 2021, Kim recorded her first professional win when she won the KG EDaily Ladies Open. It was her 115th tournament. Later that year, she would win the Hite Jinro Championship. In 2021, she would finish seventh place in the prize money for the KPLGA Tour.

On the 2022 LPGA of Korea Tour, Kim recorded two wins. That year, she won the Hana Financial Group Championship and the OK Financial Group Se Ri Pak Invitational. In the 2022 season, Kim would rank second in prize money for the KPLGA tour.

In 2023, Kim won the Hanwha Classic. That year, she recorded a T9 finish in the Amundi Evian Championship. She was named the KLPGA Player of the Year after recording 17 top-10 finishes.

In 2024, Kim won the Hite Jinro Championship, her second time winning the tournament. It was her sixth KPLGA tournament win. Earlier that year, she placed second in the DB Group Korea Women's Open Golf Championship, the Sangsangin-Hankyungtv Wownet Open and the S-Oil Championship.

In 2025, she played in her first U.S. Women's Open, but failed to make the cut.

Kim is sponsored by DB Group and is popularly known as the "Autumn Queen" for her recording five of her six wins during the season.

== Professional wins (6) ==
=== LPGA of Korea Tour wins (6) ===
- 2021 KG Edaily Ladies Open, Hite Jinro Championship
- 2022 OK Financial Group Se-ri Pak Invitational, Hana Financial Group Championship
- 2023 Hanwha Classic
- 2024 Hite Championship

== Results in LPGA majors ==
Results not in chronological order

Tournament	2023	2024	2025
Chevron Championship			
U.S. Women's Open		T29	CUT
Women's PGA Championship			CUT
The Evian Championship	T9		
Women's British Open			

Top 10
Did not play

CUT = missed the half-way cut
"T" = tied
