= Golf at the 2022 Asian Games – Women's individual =

Golf — Women's individual at the 2022 Asian Games
- Venue: West Lake International Golf Course
- Date: 28 September 2023 – 1 October 2023
- Competitors: 39 from 16 nations

Medalists
gold medal	Arpichaya Yubol	Thailand
silver medal	Aditi Ashok	India
bronze medal	Yoo Hyun-jo	South Korea

The women's individual competition at the 2022 Asian Games in Hangzhou, China was held from 28 September to 1 October, 2023 at the West Lake International Golf Course.

== Schedule ==
All times are China Standard Time (UTC+08:00)

Date	Time	Event
Saturday, 28 September 2023	10:30	Round 1
Sunday, 29 September 2023	10:30	Round 2
Monday, 30 September 2023	10:00	Round 3
Tuesday, 1 October 2023	07:30	Round 4

== Results ==
Rank	Athlete	Round				Total	To par
Rank	Athlete	1	2	3	4	Total	To par
1st place, gold medalist(s)	Arpichaya Yubol (THA)	67	65	69	68	269	−19
2nd place, silver medalist(s)	Aditi Ashok (IND)	67	66	61	77	271	−17
3rd place, bronze medalist(s)	Yoo Hyun-jo (KOR)	68	73	66	65	272	−16
4	Lin Xiyu (CHN)	67	67	68	73	275	−13
5	Patcharajutar Kongkraphan (THA)	69	67	70	70	276	−12
6	Kim Min-sol (KOR)	69	68	69	71	277	−11
7	Eila Galitsky (THA)	69	70	67	73	279	−9
T8	Yin Ruoning (CHN)	67	66	74	73	280	−8
T8	Mamika Shinchi (JPN)	69	70	71	70	280	−8
T8	Liu Yu (CHN)	67	68	71	74	280	−8
T11	Rianne Mikhaela Malixi (PHI)	68	70	73	71	282	−6
T11	Saki Baba (JPN)	65	72	68	77	282	−6
13	Pranavi Sharath Urs (IND)	71	68	70	75	284	−4
T14	Sophie Han (HKG)	71	70	73	72	286	−2
T14	Huang Ting-Hsuan (TPE)	68	73	69	76	286	−2
T14	Arianna Lau (HKG)	71	70	73	72	286	−2
17	Chien Pei-Yun (TPE)	71	70	72	76	289	+1
T18	Avani Prashanth (IND)	72	69	74	76	291	+3
T18	Koh Sock Hwee (SGP)	69	70	75	77	291	+3
20	Mizuki Hashimoto (JPN)	70	69	76	82	297	+9
T21	Lim Ji-yoo (KOR)	70	72			142	−2
T21	Tsai Pei-Ying (TPE)	73	69			142	−2
T23	Chan Tsz Ching (HKG)	73	70			143	−1
T23	Amanda Tan (SGP)	74	69			143	−1
T25	Lois Kaye Go (PHI)	72	76			148	+4
T25	Rivekka Jumagulova (KAZ)	76	72			148	+4
27	Ngo Bao Nghi (VIE)	74	75			149	+5
T28	Aloysa Margiela Mabutas Atienza (SGP)	76	77			153	+9
T28	Hun Teng Teng (MAC)	72	81			153	+9
T30	Le Chuc An (VIE)	75	80			155	+11
T30	Parkha Ijaz (PAK)	78	77			155	+11
32	Albina Agayeva (KAZ)	81	80			161	+17
33	Rimsha Ijaz (PAK)	84	80			164	+20
34	Islamiya Abeldi (KAZ)	82	85			167	+23
35	Nada Mir (QAT)	87	86			173	+29
36	Telmen Khasar (MGL)	90	84			174	+30
37	Kashmira Shah (NEP)	92	83			175	+31
38	Susma Sigdel (NEP)	88	91			179	+35
39	Ichinnorov Dolgorsuren (MGL)	93	92			185	+41
