= Céline Boutier =

French professional golfer (born 1993)

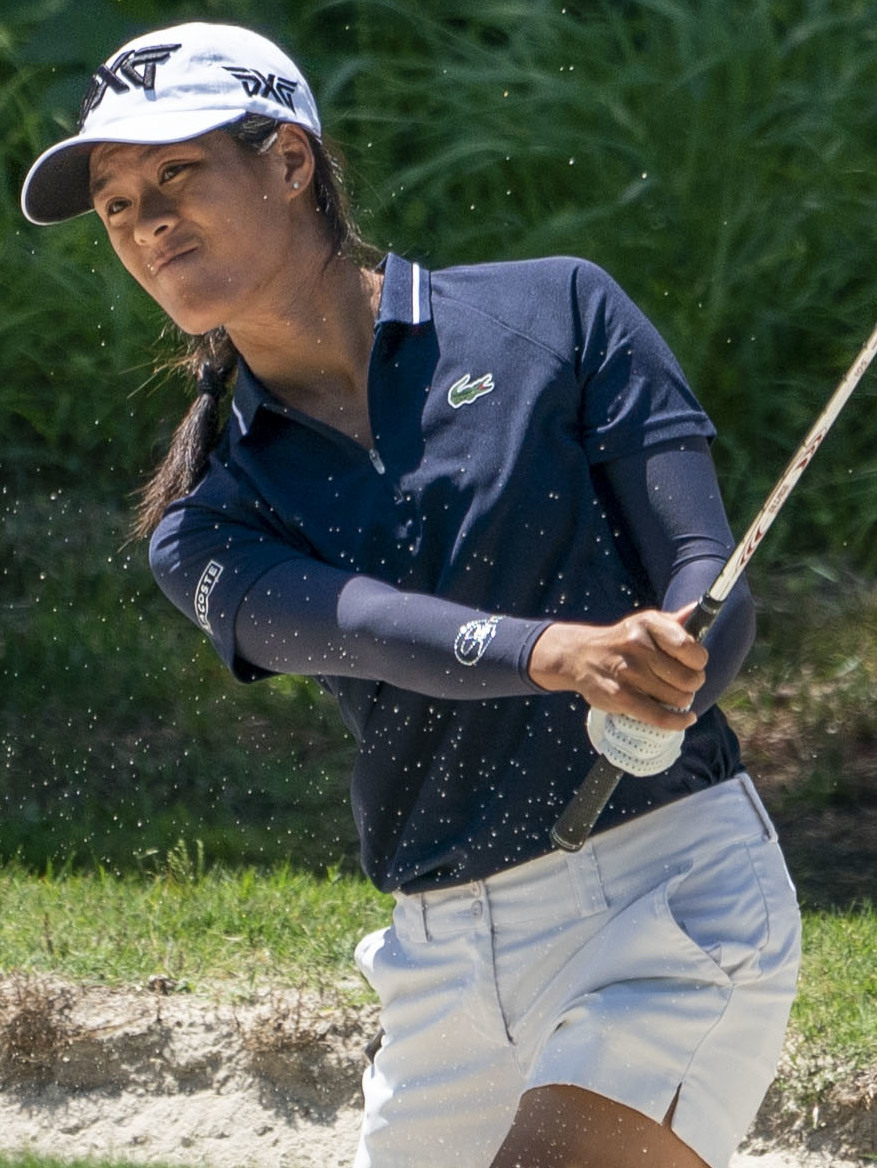
- Boutier in 2019

Personal information
- Nationality: France
- Born: 10 November 1993 (age 32) Clamart, France
- Height: 5 ft 5 in (165 cm)

Career
- Sport: Golf
- College: Duke University
- Turned professional: 2016
- Current tours: LPGA Tour; Ladies European Tour
- Former tour: Symetra Tour
- Professional wins: 16

Number of wins by tour
- LPGA Tour: 7
- Ladies European Tour: 6
- WPGA Tour of Australasia: 2
- Epson Tour: 2
- Other: 3

Best results in LPGA major championships (wins: 1)
- Chevron Championship: T4: 2022
- Women's PGA C'ship: T7: 2021
- U.S. Women's Open: T5: 2019
- Women's British Open: 6th: 2019
- Evian Championship: Won: 2023

Achievements and awards
- Honda Sports Award: 2014

Céline Boutier (born 10 November 1993) is a French professional golfer who plays on the Ladies European Tour and the LPGA Tour. She has multiple wins on both tours including one major, the 2023 Evian Championship.

== Amateur career ==
Boutier won several international amateur events including the 2012 European Ladies Amateur Championship and the 2015 British Ladies Amateur. She played college golf at Duke University from 2012 to 2016, winning four events. She helped the team to an NCAA Championship in 2014. In 2014, she was the Women's Golf Coaches Association (WCGA) Player of the Year and won the Honda Sports Award for golf. In her junior year, Boutier began working with Cameron McCormick, a swing coach known for his work with the PGA Tour's Jordan Spieth.

On 24 December 2014 Boutier became No. 1 woman in the World Amateur Golf Ranking. She remained on top until 7 April 2015. In September 2014, Boutier finished T-29th at the Evian Championship, an LPGA major in her home country.

== Professional career ==
In 2017, Boutier captured two wins on the Symetra Tour (Self Regional Healthcare Foundation Classic and Sioux Falls GreatLIFE Challenge) as well as eight top-10 finishes. She became the third member of the 2017 graduating class to exceed $100,000 in a single-season earnings and was the first player from France to earn her LPGA Tour card through the Symetra Tour since 2013. After the Symetra Tour season concluded, Boutier played several events on the Ladies European Tour, winning the Sanya Ladies Open.

In 2018, she played in 25 events on the LPGA Tour and made 16 cuts, earning $319,577 and finishing 61st on the money list. She shot a 63 in the third round of the Thornberry Creek LPGA Classic, a career low round. She also won the Australian Ladies Classic, an event co-sanctioned by the Ladies European Tour and the ALPG Tour. She finished 10th on the Ladies European Tour Order of Merit while playing in only seven events.

In February 2019, Boutier enjoyed her first LPGA Tour win at the ISPS Handa Vic Open. In the final round, Boutier made a critical birdie on the 15th hole and showed "nerves of steel" to claim a two-shot lead and victory in the $1.5 million tournament. In doing so, she ended a long drought for French players on the LPGA Tour, becoming the first female pro from France to win since Patricia Meunier-Lebouc in 2003.

With the LPGA Tour on hold because of coronavirus, Boutier won the Texas Women's Open on 4 June 2020, edging out Texas native Cheyenne Knight.

In July 2023, Boutier won the Evian Championship, the only major tournament hosted in her home country of France. She shot four rounds in the 60s and won by six strokes. She jumped 11 places from 15th to 4th on the Women's World Golf Rankings.

The following week she won the Women's Scottish Open by two strokes over Kim Hyo-joo, with three rounds in the 60s, and a final 70, for a 273 (-15) score. It was her 13th win, and fifth on both the LPGA and LET tours. She moved up 1 place from 4th to 3rd on the Women's World Golf Rankings, her highest ever.

In May 2026, Boutier won the ShopRite LPGA Classic by one stroke over Arpichaya Yubol, with a final 3-round score of 204 (−9).

== Personal life ==
Boutier was born in France to Thai parents. At Duke University in Durham, North Carolina, she earned a psychology degree with a minor in economics. Boutier has a twin sister (who does not play golf but was a nationally ranked swimmer) and a younger brother who plays on the Florida Professional Golf Tour.

== Amateur wins ==
- 2010 Skandia Junior Open Girls, Classic de Joyenval, European Girls Team Qualifying, Italian International Championship
- 2011 Annika Invitational
- 2012 European Nations Cup Individual, Internationaux De France Juniors (Trophee Esmond), German International Amateur, European Ladies Amateur Championship
- 2014 Bryan National Collegiate, PING - ASU Invitational, ACC Championship
- 2015 British Ladies Amateur
- 2016 LSU Tiger Golf Classic

== Professional wins (16) ==
=== LPGA Tour wins (7) ===
Legend
Major championships (1)
Other LPGA Tour (6)

No.	Date	Tournament	Winning score	To par	Margin of victory	Runner(s)-up
1	10 Feb 2019	ISPS Handa Vic Open^{[1]}	69-71-69-72=281	−8	2 strokes	(Australia) Sarah Kemp (Australia) Su-Hyun Oh (England) Charlotte Thomas
2	3 Oct 2021	ShopRite LPGA Classic	66-70-63=199	−14	1 stroke	(Canada) Brooke Henderson (South Korea) Ko Jin-young (South Korea) Inbee Park
3	26 Mar 2023	LPGA Drive On Championship	69-66-65-68=268	−20	Playoff	(England) Georgia Hall
4	30 Jul 2023	Amundi Evian Championship^{[2]}	66-69-67-68=270	−14	6 strokes	(Canada) Brooke Henderson
5	6 Aug 2023	Women's Scottish Open^{[2]}	69-68-66-70=273	−15	2 strokes	(South Korea) Kim Hyo-joo
6	29 Oct 2023	Maybank Championship	70-64-69-64=267	−21	Playoff	(Thailand) Atthaya Thitikul
7	31 May 2026	ShopRite LPGA Classic (2)	66-72-66=204	–9	1 stroke	(Thailand) Arpichaya Yubol

^{1} Co-sanctioned by the ALPG Tour.
^{2} Co-sanctioned by the Ladies European Tour.

LPGA Tour playoff record (2–0)

No.	Year	Tournament	Opponent	Result
1	2023	LPGA Drive On Championship	(England) Georgia Hall	Won with birdie on first extra hole
2	2023	Maybank Championship	(Thailand) Atthaya Thitikul	Won with birdie on ninth extra hole

=== Ladies European Tour wins (6) ===
No.	Date	Tournament	Winning score	To par	Margin of victory	Runner-up
1	18 Nov 2017	Sanya Ladies Open	67-69-68=204	−12	4 strokes	(United States) Solar Lee
2	9 Sep 2018	Australian Ladies Classic^{[3]}	70-68-67-73=278	−10	2 strokes	(United States) Katie Burnett
3	18 Sep 2021	Lacoste Ladies Open de France	68-66-68=202	−11	1 stroke	(Scotland) Kylie Henry
4	30 Jul 2023	Amundi Evian Championship^{[4]}	66-69-67-68=270	−14	6 strokes	(Canada) Brooke Henderson
5	6 Aug 2023	Women's Scottish Open^{[4]}	69-68-66-70=273	−15	2 strokes	(South Korea) Kim Hyo-joo
6	6 Oct 2024	Aramco Team Series – Shenzhen^{[5]}	66-68-66=200	−19	2 strokes	(China) Lin Xiyu

^{3} Co-sanctioned by the ALPG Tour.
^{4} Co-sanctioned by the LPGA Tour.
^{5} Co-sanctioned by the China LPGA Tour.

LET playoff record (0–1)

No.	Year	Tournament	Opponent	Result
1	2020	Omega Dubai Moonlight Classic	(Australia) Minjee Lee	Lost to birdie on first extra hole

=== Symetra Tour wins (2) ===
No.	Date	Tournament	Winning score	To par	Margin of victory	Runner-up
1	14 May 2017	Self Regional Healthcare Foundation Classic	68-68-70-72=278	−10	Playoff	(Colombia) Paola Moreno
2	9 Sep 2017	Sioux Falls GreatLIFE Challenge	69-70-63-71=273	−11	1 stroke	(Thailand) Benyapa Niphatsophon

=== Other wins (3) ===
- 2016 Fort Rucker Ladies Open
- 2020 Texas Women's Open, Kathy Whitworth Paris Championship

== Major championships ==
=== Wins (1) ===
Year	Championship	54 holes	Winning score	Margin	Runner-up
2023	Evian Championship	3 strokes lead	−14 (66-69-67-68=270)	6 strokes	(Canada) Brooke Henderson

=== Results timeline ===
Results not in chronological order.

Tournament	2013	2014	2015	2016	2017	2018	2019
Chevron Championship			CUT				CUT
Women's PGA Championship						CUT	T53
U.S. Women's Open		CUT	CUT				T5
The Evian Championship		T29	CUT			T69	T67
Women's British Open	T56		CUT			CUT	6

Tournament	2020	2021	2022	2023	2024	2025	2026
Chevron Championship	T44	T50	T4	T14	CUT	CUT	T21
U.S. Women's Open	CUT	T35	T34	T45	T58	T45	66
Women's PGA Championship	T37	T7	CUT	T30	T19	CUT	T59
The Evian Championship	NT	T29	CUT	1	T39	T21	CUT
Women's British Open	CUT	CUT	T7	T16	T22	T23	T12

Won
Top 10
Did not play

CUT = missed the half-way cut
NT = no tournament
"T" = tied

=== Summary ===
Tournament	Wins	2nd	3rd	Top-5	Top-10	Top-25	Events	Cuts made
Chevron Championship	0	0	0	1	1	3	9	5
U.S. Women's Open	0	0	0	1	1	1	10	7
Women's PGA Championship	0	0	0	0	1	2	9	6
The Evian Championship	1	0	0	1	1	2	10	7
Women's British Open	0	0	0	0	2	6	11	7
Totals	1	0	0	3	6	14	49	32

- Most consecutive cuts made – 6 (2022 Women's British Open – 2023 Women's British)
- Longest streak of top-10s – 1 (six times)

== LPGA Tour career summary ==
Year	Tournaments played	Cuts made *	Wins	2nd	3rd	Top 10s	Best finish	Earnings ($)	Money list rank	Scoring average	Scoring rank
2013	1	1	0	0	0	0	T56	n/a	n/a	74.25	n/a
2014	2	1	0	0	0	0	T29	n/a	n/a	73.33	n/a
2015	4	0	0	0	0	0	CUT	n/a	n/a	76.88	n/a
2016	Did not play										
2017	1	0	0	0	0	0	CUT	n/a	n/a	77.00	n/a
2018	25	16	0	0	1	1	3	319,577	61	71.87	71
2019	28	24	1	0	0	4	1	760,430	27	71.20	48
2020	18	12	0	1	0	4	2	384,353	28	71.12	21
2021	23	20	1	0	1	6	1	1,023,784	15	70.13	18
2022	24	21	0	1	1	12	2	1,262,754	16	69.86	12
2023	22	19	4	0	1	8	1	2,797,054	5	70.22	11
2024	24	22	0	2	0	4	2	1,131,625	26	70.66	17
2025	23	21	0	1	1	5	2	1,236,024	31	70.16	13
Totals^	188 (2017)	155 (2017)	6	5	5	44	1	8,915,601	37		

^ Official as of 2025 season
* Includes matchplay and other tournaments without a cut.

== Ladies European Tour career summary ==
Prize money (as of 4 December 2023) €2,163,201

== LPGA Epson/Symetra Tour career summary ==
Prize money (to end of 2017 season) $112,044

== World ranking ==
Position in Women's World Golf Rankings at the end of each calendar year.

Year	World ranking	Source
2017	188	
2018	121	
2019	65	
2020	65	
2021	28	
2022	12	
2023	3	
2024	9	
2025	19	

== Team appearances ==
Amateur

- European Girls' Team Championship (representing France): 2010 (winners), 2011 (winners)
- Vagliano Trophy (representing the Continent of Europe): 2011 (winners), 2013 (winners), 2015 (winners)
- Junior Solheim Cup (representing Europe): 2011 (tie)
- Espirito Santo Trophy (representing France): 2012, 2014
- European Ladies' Team Championship (representing France): 2013, 2014 (winners)

Professional

- Solheim Cup (representing Europe): 2019 (winners), 2021 (winners), 2023 (tied, cup retained), 2024, 2026 (winners)

=== Solheim Cup record ===
Year	Total matches	Total W–L–H	Singles W–L–H	Foursomes W–L–H	Fourballs W–L–H	Points won	Points %
Career	14	7–6–1	3–1–0	3–3–1	1–2–0	7.5	53.6
2019	4	4–0–0	1–0–0 def. A. Park 2&1	2–0–0 won w/ G. Hall 2&1 won w/ G. Hall 3&2	1–0–0 won w/ G. Hall 2 up	4	100
2021	3	1–1–1	1–0–0 def. M. Harigae 5&4	0–0–1 halved w/ G. Hall	0–1–0 lost w/ S. Popov 3&1	1.5	50
2023	3	0–3–0	0–1–0 lost to A. Yin 2&1	0–2–0 lost w/ G. Hall 1 dn lost w/ G. Hall 5&3	0-0–0	0	0
2024	4	2–2–0	1–0–0 def. L. Thompson 1 up	1–1–0 lost w/ A. Valenzuela 3&2 won w/ A. Nordqvist 4&3	0–1–0 lost w/ L. Grant 6&4	2	50
