= Bang Shin-sil =

South Korean professional golfer (born 2004)

Personal information
- Nationality: South Korea
- Born: 25 September 2004 (age 22) Anseong, South Korea

Career
- Sport: Golf
- Turned professional: 2022
- Current tour: LPGA of Korea Tour
- Professional wins: 6

Number of wins by tour
- LPGA of Korea Tour: 6

Best results in LPGA major championships
- Chevron Championship: T40: 2024
- Women's PGA C'ship: T23: 2025
- U.S. Women's Open: DNP
- Women's British Open: CUT: 2025
- Evian Championship: DNP

Bang Shin-sil (Korean: 방신실; born 25 September 2004) also known as Shinsil Bang, is a South Korean professional golfer. Bang has won six times on the LPGA of Korea Tour.

== Amateur career ==
Bang began playing competitive golf at an early age, placing in amateur competitions at age 13 in 2017. In 2019, she won the Korea Junior Championship's Ilsong Cup. In 2021, she made her international debut, when she placed 25th in the Women's Amateur Asia-Pacific. That year, Bang was diagnosed with hyperthyroidism, which had impacted her golf game.

In 2022, Bang placed 8th at the Augusta National Women's Amateur and represented Korea at that year's Queen Sirikit Cup and the Espirito Santo Trophy.

== Professional career ==
After these events, and getting treatment for her hyperthyroidism, Bang turned professional in 2022, joining the LPGA of Korea Tour.

During her rookie season, Bang won twice and had seven top-10 finishes. In 2024, Bang made her LPGA Tour debut, playing at the Chevron Championship. After making the cut, Bang finished tied for 40th at the end of the tournament.

Bang would not have her next win until April 2025, when she won the Nexen SaintNine Masters. In June, Bang again appeared on the LPGA Tour, playing in the 2025 Women's PGA Championship. She finished the competition tied for 23rd place.

== Amateur wins ==
- 2019 Korea Junior Championship - Ilsong Cup

== Professional wins (6) ==
=== LPGA of Korea Tour wins (6) ===
- 2023 E1 Charity Open, Dongbu Construction-Koreit Championship
- 2025 Nexen SaintNine Masters, High1 Resort Ladies Open, OK Savings Bank OK Man Open
- 2026 Doosan Match Play
