= Lee Ye-won =

South Korean professional golfer (born 2003)

Personal information
- Nationality: South Korea
- Born: 13 February 2003 (age 23)
- Height: 5 ft 4 in (163 cm)

Career
- Sport: Golf
- Turned professional: 2021
- Current tour: LPGA of Korea Tour
- Former tours: Jump Tour; Dream Tour
- Professional wins: 12

Number of wins by tour
- LPGA of Korea Tour: 11
- Other: 1

Best results in LPGA major championships
- Chevron Championship: DNP
- Women's PGA C'ship: DNP
- U.S. Women's Open: DNP
- Women's British Open: DNP
- Evian Championship: CUT: 2024

Achievements and awards
- LPGA of Korea Tour Rookie of the Year: 2022
- LPGA of Korea Tour leading money winner: 2023

Lee Ye-won (Korean: 이예원; born 13 February 2003), also known as Ye Won Lee, is a South Korean professional golfer who plays on the LPGA of Korea Tour. In May 2025, Lee was ranked 25th in the world in the Women's World Golf Rolex Rankings.

== Amateur career ==
Lee was noticed early as a standout amateur player, being named to the Korean National team as a junior player in 2016 and 2018. As an amateur, she won 12 Korean and international competitions including the 2018 KB Financial Group Cup Women's Amateur Golf Championship, 2019 Hosim Cup Amateur Golf Championship, and the 2020 Bitgoeul Jungheung Cup Amateur Golf Championship.

== Professional career ==
Lee turned professional in 2021 at age 17, participating in the Jump Tour and then took part in 10 tournaments on the Dream Tour, qualifying tours for the LPGA of Korea. After earning her tour card, in 2022, Lee started her rookie season on the LPGA of Korea tour. Her highest placing that season was a second at the Doosan Match Play Championship and the Ok Financial Group Se Ri Pak Invitational. Despite her winless season, Lee was confirmed as the KLGPA Rookie of the Year.

The 2023 LPGA of Korea Tour became Lee's breakout season. That year, Lee recorded three wins. She placed first at the 23rd Hite Jinro Championship, the Doosan E&C We've Championship, and the Lotte Rent A Car Ladies Open.

The following year, in the 2024, Lee marked wins at the NH Investment & Securities Ladies Championship, Suhyup-Bank MBN Ladies Open, and the Blue Canyon Ladies Championship. That year, the Korean golf press regularly compared Lee with Ina Yoon, as the players competed for the top of the KLPGA leaderboard. That year, Lee qualified for the Evian Championship, but did not make the cut. She placed third in the 2024 World Ladies Championship Salonpas Cup on the LPGA of Japan Tour. Lee finished the KPLGA season with the most wins in a season, most prize money, and the top of the leaderboard.

The 2025 season on the LPGA of Korea tour began strongly for Lee. In 2025, Lee won the 17th Doosan Match Play, the NH Investment & Securities Ladies Championship and the Doosan E&C We've Championship. After Lee's win in the 17th Doosan Match Play, she was ranked a career high 25 in the world according to the Rolex Rankings. In June, Lee surpassed 800 million won in prize money for the season, after the DB Group Korea Women's Open Golf Championship.

== Amateur wins ==
- 2020 Bitgoeuljungheung Cup

== Professional wins (12) ==
=== LPGA of Korea Tour wins (11) ===
- 2023 Lotte Rent-a-Car Women's Open, Doosan E&C We've Championship, Hite Championship
- 2024 Blue Canyon Ladies Championship, NH Investment & Securities Ladies Championship, Suhyup Bank – MBN Ladies Open
- 2025 Doosan E&C We've Championship, NH Investment & Securities Ladies Championship, Doosan Match Play
- 2026 DukshinEPC Championship, S-Oil Championship

=== Dream Tour wins (1) ===
- 2021 QCapital Partners Dream Challenge 1st

== Team appearances ==
Amateur

- Queen Sirikit Cup (representing South Korea): 2019 (winners)
