= Korea Women's Open =

South Korean golf tournament

Tournament information
- Location: South Korea
- Established: 1987
- Tour: LPGA of Korea Tour
- Format: Stroke play – 72 holes
- Prize fund: ₩1,500,000,000
- Month played: June

Current champion
- (South Korea) Kim Min-sol

The Korea Women's Open is a women's professional golf tournament in South Korea, sanctioned by the LPGA of Korea Tour.

The tournament debuted in 1987 and is the nation's national championship.

== Winners ==
#	Year	Dates	Champion	Country	Score	Winner's share (₩)	Purse (₩)
DB Group Korea Women's Open Golf Championship
40th	2026	11–14 Jun	Kim Min-sol	South Korea	72-70-68-70=280	400,000,000	1,500,000,000
39th	2025	12–15 Jun	Lee Dong-eun	South Korea	68-70-68-69=275	300,000,000	1,200,000,000
38th	2024	13–16 Jun	Ro Seung-hui	South Korea	68-68-68-71=275	300,000,000	1,200,000,000
37th	2023	15–18 Jun	Hong Ji-won	South Korea	66-70-69-71=276	300,000,000	1,200,000,000
36th	2022	16–19 Jun	Lim Hee-jeong	South Korea	68-66-66-69=269	300,000,000	1,200,000,000
35th	2021	17–20 Jun	Park Min-ji	South Korea	68-69-64-70=271	300,000,000	1,200,000,000
Kia Motors Korea Women's Open Golf Championship
34th	2020	18–21 Jun	Ryu So-yeon	South Korea	66-67-71-72=276	250,000,000	1,000,000,000
33rd	2019	13–16 Jun	Lee Da-yeon	South Korea	72-65-77-70=284	250,000,000	1,000,000,000
32nd	2018	14–17 Jun	Oh Ju-hyun	South Korea	69-68-68-66=271	250,000,000	1,000,000,000
31st	2017	15–18 Jun	Kim Ji-hyun1	South Korea	74-68-72-69=283	250,000,000	1,000,000,000
30th	2016	16–19 Jun	Ahn Shi-hyun	South Korea	71-74-74-69=288	250,000,000	1,000,000,000
29th	2015	18–21 Jun	Park Sung-hyun	South Korea	73-69-70-77=289	200,000,000	700,000,000
28th	2014	19–22 Jun	Kim Hyo-joo	South Korea	71-71-69-74=285	200,000,000	700,000,000
27th	2013	20–23 Jun	Chun In-gee	South Korea	68-69-70-68=275	130,000,000	600,000,000
Korea Women's Open Golf Championship
26th	2012	23–26 Aug	Mirim Lee	South Korea	70-72-71-68=281	130,000,000	600,000,000
Taeyoung Cup Korea Women's Open
25th	2011	12–15 May	Jung Yeon-ju	South Korea	69-75-71-70=285	130,000,000	500,000,000
24th	2010	14–16 May	Yang Soo-jin	South Korea	70-70-72=212	130,000,000	500,000,000
23rd	2009	1–3 May	Seo Hee-Kyung	South Korea	70-71-66=207	130,000,000	500,000,000
22nd	2008	16–18 May	Jiyai Shin	South Korea	75-69-69=213	130,000,000	500,000,000
21st	2007	18–20 May	Ahn Sun-ju	South Korea	73-69-70=212	100,000,000	400,000,000
20th	2006	19–21 May	Jiyai Shin	South Korea	67-73-65=205	100,000,000	400,000,000
19th	2005	13–15 May	Lee Jee-young	South Korea	71-70-73=214	60,000,000	300,000,000
Korea Women's Open
18th	2004	18–20 Jun	Song Bo-bae	South Korea	70-70-68=208	36,000,000	200,000,000
17th	2003	4–6 Sep	Song Bo-bae	South Korea	72-69-69=210	–	200,000,000
16th	2002	26–28 Apr	Chung Il-mi	South Korea	69-67-72=208	36,000,000	200,000,000
15th	2001	11–13 May	Kang Soo-yun	South Korea	71-67-67=205	36,000,000	200,000,000
14th	2000	12–14 May	Kang Soo-yun	South Korea	69-70-68=207	39,384,000	
13th	1999	29–31 Oct	Kim Young	South Korea	73-72-74=219	42,408,000	
12th	1998						
11th	1997	24–26 Oct	Jang Jeong	South Korea	72-72-76=220	–	120,000,000
10th	1996	23–25 Oct	Kim Mi-hyun	South Korea	70-74-72=216	18,000,000	100,000,000
9th	1995	13–15 Jul	Kim Mi-hyun	South Korea	71-71-68=210	–	70,000,000
8th	1994	30 Jun–2 Jul	Kim Sun-mi	South Korea	72-71-69=212	13,000,000	50,000,000
7th	1993	29–31 Jul	Chung Il-mi	South Korea	70-70=140	–	50,000,000
6th	1992	22–24 Oct	Lee Oh-soon	South Korea	72-71-74=217	12,500,000	50,000,000
5th	1991	26–28 Sep	Ko Woo-soon	South Korea	71-78-76=225	12,500,000	50,000,000
4th	1990	27–29 Jun	Kim Mee-hoe	South Korea	76-74-75=225	8,000,000	30,000,000
3rd	1989	23–25 Aug	Ko Woo-soon	South Korea	74-76-82=232	5,000,000	20,000,000
2rd	1988	25–27 Apr	Ko Woo-soon	South Korea	74-69-75=218	4,000,000	15,000,000
1st	1987	19–21 Aug	Kang Choon-ja	South Korea	78-81-75=234	3,000,000	10,000,000
