= Yoo Hyun-jo =

South Korean professional golfer (born 2005)

Personal information
- Nationality: South Korea
- Born: 2 March 2005 (age 21)
- Height: 170 cm (5 ft 7 in)

Career
- Sport: Golf
- Turned professional: 2023
- Current tour: LPGA of Korea Tour
- Professional wins: 5

Number of wins by tour
- LPGA of Korea Tour: 5

Best results in LPGA major championships
- Chevron Championship: DNP
- Women's PGA C'ship: DNP
- U.S. Women's Open: T34: 2026
- Women's British Open: DNP
- Evian Championship: CUT: 2026
Medal record
Women's golf
Representing South Korea
Asian Games
Silver medal – second place	2022 Hangzhou	Team
Bronze medal – third place	2022 Hangzhou	Individual

Yoo Hyun-jo (Korean: 유현조; born 2 March 2005), also known as Hyunjo Yoo, is a South Korean professional golfer. In 2024, she was named Rookie of the Year on the LPGA of Korea Tour.

== Early life ==
Yoo was born in South Korea in 2005. She began playing golf in kindergarten. In third grade, she committed herself to becoming a professional player.

== Amateur career ==
In 2022, Yoo earned an individual bronze medal in the 2022 Asian games, as well as a silver team medal with Korea. She was the only amateur player on the team. That year, she won the KB Financial Group Cup, an all ages amateur competition.

== Professional career ==
In 2023, Yoo joined the LPGA of Korea Tour. In 2024, she won her first tournament, the KB Financial Group Star Championship, a majors competition. During the 2024 season, Yoo finished in the top-10 in ten tournaments, where she became known for her long drives.

Yoo earned a berth to the 2025 U.S. Women's Open for being ranked in the top-75 in the Rolex Women's World Golf rankings. Prior to the tournament, Yoo was ranked 59th. Yoo made her debut at the tournament aged 20. Yoo made the second round cut.

== Professional wins (5) ==
=== LPGA of Korea Tour wins (5) ===
- 2024 KB Financial Group Star Championship
- 2025 KB Financial Group Star Championship
- 2026 DB Women's Championship, HJ Ship building-Dongbu Construction Championship, Daebo HausD Championship

== Results in LPGA majors ==
Tournament	2025	2026
Chevron Championship		
U.S. Women's Open	T36	T34
Women's PGA Championship		
The Evian Championship		CUT
Women's British Open		

Did not play

CUT = missed the half-way cut
"T" = tied

== Team appearances ==
- 2022 Asian Games (representing South Korea)
