= Park Min-ji (golfer) =

South Korean professional golfer (born 1998)

Personal information
- Nationality: South Korea
- Born: 1998 (age 27–28)
- Height: 160 cm (5 ft 3 in)

Career
- Sport: Golf
- Turned professional: 2016
- Current tour: LPGA of Korea Tour
- Professional wins: 20

Number of wins by tour
- LPGA of Korea Tour: 20

Best results in LPGA major championships
- Chevron Championship: DNP
- Women's PGA C'ship: DNP
- U.S. Women's Open: T13: 2023
- Women's British Open: DNP
- Evian Championship: T20: 2023

Achievements and awards
- LPGA of Korea Tour leading money winner: 2021, 2022

Park Min-ji (born 1998) is a South Korean professional golfer. She plays on the LPGA of Korea Tour where she has 20 wins.

== Professional career ==
In May 2026, Park won her 20th victory at the Suhyup Bank MBN Ladies Open.

== Amateur wins ==
this list may be incomplete

- 2016 Australian Women's Amateur, Bear Creek Cup

== Professional wins (20) ==
=== LPGA of Korea Tour wins (20) ===
- 2017 (1) Samchully Together Open
- 2018 (1) ADT CAPS Championship
- 2019 (1) Bogner MBN Ladies Open
- 2020 (1) Dayouwinia MBN Ladies Open
- 2021 (6) Nexen Saint Nine Masters, NH Investment & Securities Ladies Championship, Doosan Match Play Championship, Celltrion Queens Masters, **DB Group Korea Women's Open Golf Championship**, Daebo hausD Open
- 2022 (6) NH Investment & Securities Ladies Championship, Celltrion Queens Masters, BC Card Hankyung Ladies Cup, **KB Financial Group Star Championship**, **Hite Jinro Championship**, SK Shieldus SK Telecom Championship
- 2023 (2) Celltrion Queens Masters, BC Card-Hankyung Ladies Cup
- 2024 (1) Celltrion Queens Masters
- 2026 (1) Suhyup Bank MBN Ladies Open

Tournaments in bold denotes major tournaments in LPGA of Korea Tour.

== Team appearances ==
Amateur

- Espirito Santo Trophy (representing South Korea): 2016 (winners)
