= An Na-rin =

South Korean golfer (born 1996)

Personal information
- Nationality: South Korea
- Born: 5 January 1996 (age 30) Seoul, South Korea
- Height: 5 ft 6 in (1.68 m)

Career
- Sport: Golf
- Turned professional: 2014
- Current tour: LPGA Tour (joined 2022)
- Former tours: LPGA of Korea Tour (joined 2017); Dream Tour (joined 2014)
- Professional wins: 2

Number of wins by tour
- LPGA of Korea Tour: 2

Best results in LPGA major championships
- Chevron Championship: T30: 2024
- Women's PGA C'ship: T30: 2023
- U.S. Women's Open: T58: 2022, 2024
- Women's British Open: T30: 2025
- Evian Championship: T12: 2024

An Na-rin (born 5 January 1996), also known as Narin An, is a South Korean professional golfer and LPGA Tour player.

== Career ==
An was born and raised in South Korea, where she started playing golf at age 15. She turned professional and joined the Dream Tour in 2014 and the LPGA of Korea Tour in 2017. She was runner-up at the 2017 Caido Ladies Open and 2018 Nexen Saint Nine Masters, before winning the Autech Carrier Championship and Hana Financial Group Championship in 2020.

In 2021, An finished tied 3rd at the KLPGA and LPGA Tour co-sanctioned BMW Ladies Championship. She recorded a total of 15 top-20 finishes, including two runner-ups at the NH Investment & Securities Ladies Championship, and the Dongbu Construction Koreit Championship. She earned medalist honors at LPGA Q-Series to earn LPGA Tour membership for the 2022 season. She became the second player from Korea to top the LPGA Q-Series, joining Lee Jeong-eun in 2018.

In her rookie season on the LPGA Tour, her best finish was a solo third place at the 2022 JTBC Classic, after which she rose to 39th in the Women's World Golf Rankings. In 2023, she recorded a solo fourth place at the LPGA Drive On Championship, and in 2024 she was runner-up at the Portland Classic, where she shot a hole-in-one.

== Professional wins (2) ==
=== LPGA of Korea Tour wins (2) ===
- 2020 Autech Carrier Championship, Hana Financial Group Championship

== Results in LPGA majors ==
Results not in chronological order.

Tournament	2020	2021	2022	2023	2024	2025	2026
Chevron Championship			T44	T41	T30	CUT	CUT
U.S. Women's Open	T63		T58	CUT	T58	CUT	
Women's PGA Championship			64	T30	T46	T66	CUT
The Evian Championship	NT		CUT	CUT	T12	T21	CUT
Women's British Open			T41	T66	T60	T30	

Did not play

CUT = missed the half-way cut
NT = no tournament
"T" = tied

=== Summary ===
Tournament	Wins	2nd	3rd	Top-5	Top-10	Top-25	Events	Cuts made
Chevron Championship	0	0	0	0	0	0	5	3
U.S. Women's Open	0	0	0	0	0	0	5	3
Women's PGA Championship	0	0	0	0	0	0	5	4
The Evian Championship	0	0	0	0	0	2	5	2
Women's British Open	0	0	0	0	0	0	4	4
Totals	0	0	0	0	0	2	24	16
