= Kim Hyo-joo =

South Korean professional golfer (born 1995)

Kim Hyo-joo 김효주
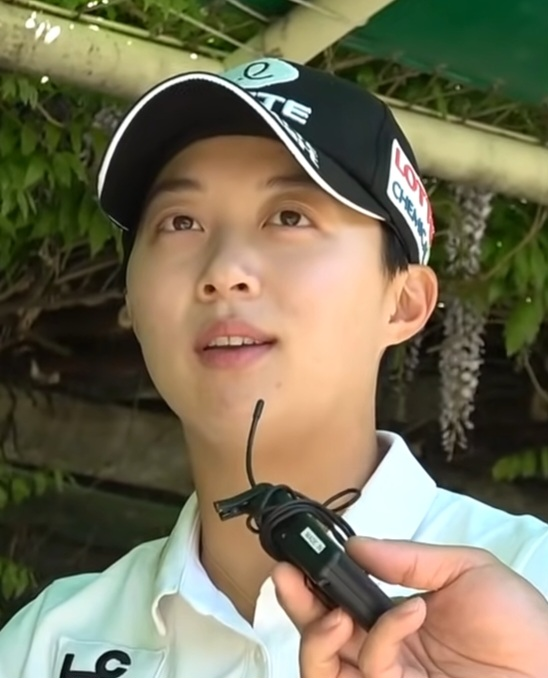

Personal information
- Nationality: South Korea
- Born: 14 July 1995 (age 31) Wonju, Gangwon Province, South Korea
- Height: 5 ft 5 in (165 cm)

Career
- Sport: Golf
- College: Korea University
- Turned professional: 2012
- Current tours: LPGA of Korea Tour; LPGA Tour (joined 2015)
- Professional wins: 29

Number of wins by tour
- LPGA Tour: 9
- Ladies European Tour: 3
- LPGA of Japan Tour: 1
- LPGA of Korea Tour: 16
- Other: 1

Best results in LPGA major championships (wins: 1)
- Chevron Championship: T2: 2025
- Women's PGA C'ship: T3: 2021
- U.S. Women's Open: 2nd: 2018
- Women's British Open: T4: 2023
- Evian Championship: Won: 2014

Achievements and awards
- LPGA of Korea Tour leading money winner: 2014, 2020

- Kim Hyo-joo
- Hangul: 김효주
- Hanja: 金孝周
- RR: Gim Hyoju
- MR: Kim Hyoju

Kim Hyo-joo (Korean: 김효주; Hanja: 金孝周; Korean pronunciation: [kim.çod͡ʑu]; born 14 July 1995), also known as Hyo Joo Kim, is a South Korean professional golfer who plays on the LPGA of Korea Tour and the LPGA Tour. She has won 29 professional titles, including one major—the 2014 Evian Championship.

== Career ==
Kim won the 2014 Evian Championship while setting the record for lowest 18-hole score at a major with a 61 in the first round. She reached the 18th hole of her final round a shot behind Karrie Webb, but a birdie for Kim and a bogey by Webb gave her the title. Aged 19 years and 2 months, she became the third-youngest winner of a women's major. The tournament was her debut appearance in a major. She later accepted membership on the LPGA Tour for 2015. In January 2016, she won the Pure Silk-Bahamas LPGA Classic, a seven-under-par final round left her two strokes clear of the field. In May 2021, she won the HSBC Women's World Championship by one stroke from Hannah Green who bogeyed her last two holes. In April 2022, she won the Lotte Championship, finishing two strokes ahead of Hinako Shibuno.

In 2025, Kim defeated Lilia Vu in a playoff to win her seventh LPGA Tour at the Ford Championship. title. In 2026, she won the Fortinet Founders Cup. She recorded a wire-to-wire victory to finish one shot ahead of Nelly Korda. One week later, Kim won the Ford Championship, after shooting two rounds of 61 in a LPGA Tour 54-hole scoring record 191. She ended the event two strokes ahead of Korda, and moved to number three in the world rankings. She also finished runner-up at both the Dow Championship and the FM Championship.

== Professional wins (29) ==
=== LPGA of Korea Tour wins (15) ===
No.	Date	Tournament	Winning score	To par	Margin of victory	Runner(s)-up
1	15 Apr 2012	Lotte Mart Women's Open (as an amateur)	66-67-73-66=272	−16	9 strokes	(South Korea) Moon Hyun-hee
2	16 Dec 2012	Hyundai China Ladies Open	68-68-69=205	−11	2 strokes	(South Korea) Kim Hye-youn
3	22 Jun 2014	**Kia Motors Korea Women's Open**	71-71-69-74=285	-3	2 strokes	(South Korea) Bae Seon-woo
4	6 Jul 2014	Kumho Tire Ladies Open	67-67-69=203	−13	7 strokes	(South Korea) Ko Jin-young
5	3 Aug 2014	Hanwha Finance Classic	69-69-76-69=283	−5	6 strokes	(South Korea) Lee Jung-min
6	12 Oct 2014	**Hite Jinro Championship**	69-73-69-73=284	−4	Playoff	(South Korea) Lee Jung-min
7	26 Oct 2014	**KB Financial Star Championship**	69-71-67-69=276	−12	1 stroke	(South Korea) Inbee Park
8	14 Dec 2014	Hyundai China Ladies Open	70-67-65=202	−14	2 strokes	(South Korea) Chun In-gee
9	5 Jul 2015	Kumho Tire Ladies Open	68-66-72=206	−10	4 strokes	(China) Shanshan Feng
10	18 Dec 2016	Hyundai China Ladies Open	74-69-67=210	−6	2 strokes	(South Korea) Jang Ha-na (South Korea) Lim Eun-bin
11	7 Jun 2020	Lotte Cantata Ladies Open	66-68-69-67=270	−18	Playoff	(South Korea) Kim Sei-young
12	18 Oct 2020	**KB Financial Group Star Championship**	66-69-69-75=279	−9	8 strokes	(South Korea) Ko Jin-young
13	19 Sep 2021	OKSavingsBank Se Ri Pak Invitational	68-67-66=201	−15	2 strokes	(South Korea) Hong Jung-min
14	31 Oct 2021	SK Networks Seokyung Ladies Classic	71-68-67-68=274	−14	1 stroke	(South Korea) Lee So-young
15	10 May 2026	NH Investment & Securities Ladies Championship	70-66-71=207	−9	1 stroke	(South Korea) Park Hyun-kyung
16	5 Jul 2026	Lotte Open	66-69-71-67=274	−15	1 stroke	(South Korea) Lee Da-yeon (South Korea) Lee Se-hee (South Korea) Park Ye-ji (South Korea) Yoo Hyun-jo

Tournaments in bold denotes major tournaments in LPGA of Korea Tour.

=== LPGA of Japan Tour wins (1) ===
No.	Date	Tournament	Winning score	To par	Margin of victory	Runner-up
1	10 Jun 2012	Suntory Ladies Open (as an amateur)	71-71-68-61=271	−17	4 strokes	(Japan) Miki Saiki

=== LPGA Tour wins (9) ===
Legend
Major championships (1)
Other LPGA Tour (7)

No.	Date	Tournament	Winning score	To par	Margin of victory	Runner(s)-up	Winner's share ($)
1	14 Sep 2014	**The Evian Championship**^	61-72-72-68=273	−11	1 stroke	(Australia) Karrie Webb	487,500
2	22 Mar 2015	JTBC Founders Cup	65-69-66-67=267	−21	3 strokes	(United States) Stacy Lewis	225,000
3	31 Jan 2016	Pure Silk-Bahamas LPGA Classic	70-70-68-66=274	−18	2 strokes	(South Korea) Kim Sei-young (United States) Stacy Lewis (Sweden) Anna Nordqvist	210,000
4	2 May 2021	HSBC Women's World Championship	67-68-72-64=271	−17	1 stroke	(Australia) Hannah Green	240,000
5	16 Apr 2022	Lotte Championship	67-67-72-71=277	−11	2 strokes	(Japan) Hinako Shibuno	300,000
6	8 Oct 2023	Volunteers of America Classic	64-68-70-69=271	−13	4 strokes	(Philippines) Bianca Pagdanganan (Thailand) Atthaya Thitikul	270,000
7	30 Mar 2025	Ford Championship	69-66-67-64=266	−22	Playoff	(United States) Lilia Vu	337,500
8	22 Mar 2026	Fortinet Founders Cup	63-70-66-73=272	−16	1 stroke	(United States) Nelly Korda	450,000
9	29 Mar 2026	Ford Championship	61-69-61-69=260	−28	2 strokes	(United States) Nelly Korda	337,500

^ Co-sanctioned with the Ladies European Tour

LPGA Tour playoff record (1–2)

No.	Year	Tournament	Opponent	Result
1	2018	**U.S. Women's Open**	(Thailand) Ariya Jutanugarn	Jutanugarn won with par on fourth playoff hole two hole aggregate playoff: Kim: 3-5=8 (E), 4–5, Jutanugarn: 4-4=8 (E), 4-4
2	2025	Ford Championship	(United States) Lilia Vu	Won with a birdie on the first extra hole
3	2025	**Chevron Championship**	(United States) Lindy Duncan (Thailand) Ariya Jutanugarn (Japan) Mao Saigo (China) Yin Ruoning	Saigo won with birdie on first extra hole

=== Ladies European Tour wins (3) ===
No.	Date	Tournament	Winning score	To par	Margin of victory	Runner-up	Winner's share ($)
1	14 Sep 2014	**The Evian Championship**^	61-72-72-68=273	−11	1 stroke	(Australia) Karrie Webb	487,500
2	12 May 2024	Aramco Team Series – Korea	68-70-68=206	−10	3 strokes	(England) Charley Hull	75,000
3	11 May 2025	Aramco Korea Championship	70-70-69=209	−7	2 strokes	(Switzerland) Chiara Tamburlini	225,000

^ Co-sanctioned with the LPGA Tour

=== Other wins (1) ===
No.	Date	Tournament	Winning score	To par	Margin of victory	Runner-up
1	13 Sep 2012	Swinging Skirts TLPGA Open (LPGA of Taiwan) (as an amateur)	69-68-70=207	−9	5 strokes	(Taiwan) Ssu-chia Cheng

== Major championships ==
=== Wins (1) ===
Year	Championship	Winning score	Margin	Runner-up	Winner's share ($)
2014	The Evian Championship	−11 (61-72-72-68=273)	1 stroke	(Australia) Karrie Webb	487,500

=== Results timeline ===
Results not in chronological order.

Tournament	2014	2015	2016	2017	2018	2019	2020	2021	2022	2023	2024	2025	2026
Chevron Championship		T11	T18	T40	CUT	T6		T28	T8	11	CUT	T2	6
U.S. Women's Open		CUT	T38	CUT	2	CUT		T20	CUT	T6	T12	CUT	CUT
Women's PGA Championship		T9	CUT	CUT	T15	T7		T3	T5	T20	T16	WD	T42
The Evian Championship	1	T20	T39	T14	T49	T2		T17	T3	T20	T12	T31	T26
Women's British Open		T13	CUT	T7	T22	T24			T15	T4	T29	T13	T16

Win
Top 10
Did not play

CUT = missed the half-way cut
WD = withdrew
T = tied

=== Summary ===
Tournament	Wins	2nd	3rd	Top-5	Top-10	Top-25	Events	Cuts made
Chevron Championship	0	1	0	1	4	7	11	9
U.S. Women's Open	0	1	0	1	2	4	11	5
Women's PGA Championship	0	0	1	2	4	7	11	8
The Evian Championship	1	1	1	3	3	8	12	12
Women's British Open	0	0	0	1	2	7	10	9
Totals	1	3	2	8	15	33	55	43

- Most consecutive cuts made – 8 (2019 PGA – 2022 Chevron)
- Longest streak of top 10s – 2 (twice)

== LPGA Tour career summary ==
Year	Tournaments played	Cuts made*	Wins	2nd	3rd	Top 10s	Best finish	Earnings ($)	Money list rank	Scoring average	Scoring rank
2012	4	4	0	0	0	1	T4	n/a	n/a	70.60	n/a
2013	2	2	0	0	0	1	T9	n/a	n/a	70.43	n/a
2014	4	4	1	0	0	4	1	n/a	n/a	69.75	n/a
2015	24	22	1	0	0	9	1	923,221	13	70.14	5
2016	27	23	1	0	1	6	1	753,638	20	70.97	24
2017	22	18	0	0	0	4	T7	492,408	38	70.24	18
2018	22	18	0	1	0	1	2	753,439	25	71.61	60
2019	21	20	0	3	0	12	2	1,290,734	10	69.41	2
2020	Did not play										
2021	16	15	1	0	1	4	1	855,962	21	70.19	20
2022	17	15	1	0	3	8	1	1,533,497	11	69.39	2
2023	20	20	1	2	1	9	1	2,123,856	7	69.63	2
2024	18	15	0	0	0	3	T5	879,118	44	71.11	43
2025	18	15	1	3	0	7	1	1,737,466	13	69.87	5
Totals^	205 (2015)	181 (2015)	7	9	6	63	1	11,343,339	25		

^ Official as of 2025 season
*Includes matchplay and other tournaments without a cut.

== World ranking ==
Position in Women's World Golf Rankings at the end of each calendar year.

Year	World ranking	Source
2012	41	
2013	25	
2014	7	
2015	9	
2016	25	
2017	48	
2018	45	
2019	13	
2020	9	
2021	9	
2022	9	
2023	7	
2024	23	
2025	8	

== Team appearances ==
Amateur

- Espirito Santo Trophy (representing South Korea): 2012 (winners)

Professional

- International Crown (representing South Korea): 2023, 2025
