= Park Hyun-kyung =

South Korean golfer (born 2000)

Personal information
- Nickname: Cutiful
- Nationality: South Korea
- Born: 7 January 2000 (age 26) South Korea
- Height: 167 cm (5 ft 6 in)

Career
- Sport: Golf
- Turned professional: 2018
- Current tours: LPGA of Japan Tour (joined 2025); LPGA of Korea Tour (joined 2018)
- Professional wins: 9

Number of wins by tour
- LPGA of Japan Tour: 1
- LPGA of Korea Tour: 8

Park Hyun-kyung (Korean: 박현경; born 7 January 2000) is a South Korean professional golfer. She has 8 wins on the LPGA of Korea Tour and 1 win on the LPGA of Japan Tour.

== Early life and amateur career ==
Park began to play golf at the age of 8, due to her father's influence.

== Professional career ==
In the 15th Earth Mondahmin Cup (25–29 June 2026), she started the final day tied for the lead. She recorded a 68, including 5 birdies and 1 bogey, and finished with a total score of −12, 1 stroke ahead of Nanako Inagaki and Mitsuki Kobayashi, to capture her maiden win on the LPGA of Japan Tour.

== Professional wins (9) ==
=== LPGA of Japan Tour wins (1) ===
No.	Date	Tournament	Winning score	To par	Margin of victory	Runner-up
1	29 Jun 2026	Earth Mondahmin Cup	70-68-70-68=276	−12	1 stroke	(Japan) Nanako Inagaki (Japan) Mitsuki Kobayashi

=== LPGA of Korea Tour wins (8) ===
- 2020 **KLPGA Championship**, IS Dongseo Busan Open
- 2021 **CreaS F&C KLPGA Championship**
- 2023 SK Networks-Seoul Economics Ladies Classic
- 2024 Doosan Match Play Championship, BC Card-Hankyung Ladies Cup, McCol-Mona Park Yongpyong Open
- 2025 E1 Charity Open

Tournaments in bold denotes major tournaments in LPGA of Korea Tour.
