= LPGA of Korea Tour =

South Korean women's professional golf tour

The LPGA of Korea Tour is a South Korean professional golf tour for women. LPGA stands for Ladies Professional Golf Association. LPGA of Korea runs this tour, not the American LPGA. It is one of the world's five leading women's golf tours.

Based on the April 2019 exchange rates, in 2019 the main tour has total prize fund of roughly 21.7 million USD.

== Historical tour schedules and results ==
Year	Tournaments
2016	33
2015	31
2014	26
2013	23
2012	21
2011	20
2010	22
2009	20
2008	26

== Season money leaders ==
Year	Player	Earnings (₩)	Most wins
2026	(South Korea) Kim Min-sol	1,628,439,428	4 – Seo Kyo-rim
2025	(South Korea) Hong Jung-min	1,341,523,334	3 – Bang Shin-sil, Hong Jung-min, Lee Ye-won
2024	(South Korea) Yoon Ina	1,211,415,715	3 – Bae So-hyun, Lee Ye-won, Ma Da-so, Park Hyun-kyung, Park Ji-young
2023	(South Korea) Lee Ye-won	1,424,817,530	4 – Im Jin-hee
2022	(South Korea) Park Min-ji	1,477,921,143	6 – Park Min-ji
2021	(South Korea) Park Min-ji	1,521,374,313	6 – Park Min-ji
2020	(South Korea) Kim Hyo-joo	797,137,207	2 – An Na-rin, Choi Hye-jin, Kim Hyo-joo, Park Hyun-kyung
2019	(South Korea) Choi Hye-jin	1,207,162,636	5 – Choi Hye-jin
2018	(South Korea) Lee Jeong-eun	957,641,447	3 – Lee So-young
2017	(South Korea) Lee Jeong-eun	1,149,052,534	4 – Lee Jeong-eun
2016	(South Korea) Park Sung-hyun	1,333,090,667	7 – Park Sung-hyun
2015	(South Korea) Chun In-gee	913,760,833	5 – Chun In-gee
2014	(South Korea) Kim Hyo-joo	1,208,978,590	5 – Kim Hyo-joo
2013	(South Korea) Jang Ha-na	689,542,549	3 – Jang Ha-na, Kim Sei-young
2012	(South Korea) Kim Ha-neul	458,898,803	3 – Kim Ja-young
2011	(South Korea) Kim Ha-neul	524,297,417	3 – Kim Ha-neul
2010	(South Korea) Lee Bo-mee	557,276,856	3 – Lee Bo-mee
2009	(South Korea) Hee-kyung Seo	663,759,286	5 – Hee-kyung Seo
2008	(South Korea) Jiyai Shin	765,184,500	7 – Jiyai Shin
2007	(South Korea) Jiyai Shin	674,541,667	9 – Jiyai Shin
2006	(South Korea) Jiyai Shin	374,054,333	3 – Jiyai Shin
2005	(South Korea) Kyeong Bae	195,237,450	2 – Lee Jee-young, Song Bo-bae

== See also ==
- Professional golf tours
- Women's World Golf Rankings
- Korean Tour
