= 2021 in golf =

This article summarizes the highlights of professional and amateur golf in the year 2021.

== Men's professional golf ==
=== Major championships ===
- 8–11 April: Masters Tournament – Hideki Matsuyama became the first Japanese male golfer to win a major championship, and the first Asian-born golfer to win the Masters, finishing one stroke ahead of Will Zalatoris.
- 20–23 May: PGA Championship – Phil Mickelson won by two strokes over Brooks Koepka and Louis Oosthuizen; it was his second PGA Championship victory, and his sixth major championship victory. He is the oldest player to win a major championship.
- 17–20 June: U.S. Open – Jon Rahm won by one shot over Louis Oosthuizen. It was his first major victory and he became the first U.S. Open champion from Spain.
- 15–18 July: The Open Championship – Collin Morikawa won by two strokes over Jordan Spieth. It was his first Open Championship victory, and his second major victory.

=== World Golf Championships ===
- 25–28 February: WGC-Workday Championship – Collin Morikawa won by three strokes over Billy Horschel, Viktor Hovland, and Brooks Koepka.
- 24–28 March: WGC-Dell Technologies Match Play – Billy Horschel defeated Scottie Scheffler, 2 and 1, in the championship match. It was his first WGC victory.
- 5–8 August: WGC-FedEx St. Jude Invitational – Abraham Ancer defeated Sam Burns and Hideki Matsuyama on the second hole of a sudden-death playoff. It was his first WGC (and PGA Tour) win.
- 28–31 October: WGC-HSBC Champions – Cancelled

=== FedEx Cup playoff events ===
- 19–22 August: The Northern Trust – Tony Finau defeated Cameron Smith in a playoff.
- 26–29 August: BMW Championship – Patrick Cantlay defeated Bryson DeChambeau in a playoff.
- 2–5 September: Tour Championship – Patrick Cantlay won by one stroke over Jon Rahm.

=== Other leading PGA Tour events ===
- 11–14 March: The Players Championship – Justin Thomas won by one stroke over Lee Westwood for his first Players victory.

For a complete list of PGA Tour results see 2020–21 PGA Tour.

=== Leading European Tour events ===
- 9–12 September: BMW PGA Championship – Billy Horschel won by one stroke over Kiradech Aphibarnrat, Laurie Canter, and Jamie Donaldson. He became the second American golfer to win the BMW PGA Championship (Arnold Palmer, 1975).
- 18–21 November: DP World Tour Championship, Dubai – Collin Morikawa won by three strokes over Alexander Björk and Matt Fitzpatrick. He also won the Race to Dubai.

For a complete list of European Tour results see 2021 European Tour.

=== Team events ===
- 24–26 September: Ryder Cup – Team USA defeated Europe by a score of 19 to 9.

=== Tour leaders ===
- PGA Tour
  - FedEx Cup – (United States) Patrick Cantlay
  - Leading money winner – (Spain) Jon Rahm (US$7,705,933) (Note: This total does not include FedEx Cup bonuses.)
- European Tour – (United States) Collin Morikawa (5,856 points)
- Japan Golf Tour – (United States) Chan Kim (¥127,599,803)
- Asian Tour – season extended into 2022
- PGA Tour of Australasia – (Australia) Brad Kennedy (A$302,480) – 2020–21 season
- Sunshine Tour – (South Africa) Christiaan Bezuidenhout (R 7,789,088) – 2020–21 season

=== Awards ===
- PGA Tour
  - PGA Player of the Year – (Spain) Jon Rahm
  - Player of the Year (Jack Nicklaus Trophy) – (United States) Patrick Cantlay
  - Vardon Trophy – (Spain) Jon Rahm
  - Byron Nelson Award – (Spain) Jon Rahm
  - Rookie of the Year (Arnold Palmer Award) – (United States) Will Zalatoris
  - Payne Stewart Award – (England) Justin Rose
- European Tour
  - Golfer of the Year –
  - Rookie of the Year – (Germany) Matti Schmid
- Korn Ferry Tour
  - Player of the Year – (Germany) Stephan Jäger

=== Results from other tours ===
- 2020–21–22 Asian Tour
- 2020–21 PGA Tour of Australasia
- 2021–22 PGA Tour of Australasia
- 2021 PGA Tour Canada
- Forme Tour
- 2021 Challenge Tour
- 2020–21 Japan Golf Tour
- 2020–21 PGA Tour Latinoamérica
- 2020–21 Sunshine Tour
- 2021–22 Sunshine Tour
- 2020–21 Korn Ferry Tour

=== Other happenings ===
- 20 June: Jon Rahm regained the top spot in the Official World Golf Ranking after winning the U.S. Open, gaining it for the third time, replacing Dustin Johnson.
- 11 July: Dustin Johnson regained the top spot in the Official World Golf Ranking, gaining it for the seventh time, replacing Rahm.
- 18 July: Rahm regained the top spot in the Official World Golf Ranking, gaining it for the fourth time, replacing Johnson.

== Women's professional golf ==
=== LPGA majors ===
- 1–4 April: ANA Inspiration – Patty Tavatanakit won her first major by two strokes over Lydia Ko.
- 3–6 June: U.S. Women's Open – Yuka Saso won her first major in a playoff over Nasa Hataoka.
- 24–27 June: KPMG Women's PGA Championship – Nelly Korda won her first major by three strokes over Lizette Salas.
- 22–25 July: The Evian Championship – Minjee Lee won her first major at the first hole of a sudden-death playoff over Lee Jeong-eun.
- 19–22 August: Women's British Open – Anna Nordqvist won her third major by one stroke over Georgia Hall, Madelene Sagström and Lizette Salas.

=== Additional LPGA Tour events ===
- 18–21 November: CME Group Tour Championship – Ko Jin-young won for the second consecutive year. She also won the Race to the CME Globe, Player of the Year, and topped the money list.

For a complete list of LPGA Tour results, see 2021 LPGA Tour.
For a complete list of Ladies European Tour results see 2021 Ladies European Tour.

=== Team events ===
- 4–6 September: Solheim Cup – The European team defeated the United States, 15 to 13.

=== Money list leaders ===
- LPGA Tour – (South Korea) Ko Jin-young ($3,502,161)
- Ladies European Tour – (Thailand) Atthaya Thitikul (3,591.96 points)
- LPGA of Japan Tour – Mone Inami (¥255,192,049)
- LPGA of Korea Tour – (South Korea) Park Min-ji (₩1,521,374,313)
- ALPG Tour –
- Symetra Tour – (United States) Lilia Vu ($162,292)

=== Other tour results ===
- 2021 ALPG Tour
- 2020–21 LPGA of Japan Tour
- 2021 LPGA of Korea Tour
- 2021 Symetra Tour

=== Other happenings ===
- 28 June: Nelly Korda became the number one golfer in the Women's World Golf Rankings after her win at the KPMG Women's PGA Championship, replacing Ko Jin-young.
- 25 October: Ko regains number one position from Korda after winning the BMW Ladies Championship.
- 8 November: Korda regains the number one position from Ko.

== Senior men's professional golf ==
=== Senior majors ===
- 6–9 May: Regions Tradition – Alex Čejka beat Steve Stricker in a playoff to claim his first senior victory in only his third start on the PGA Tour Champions.
- 27–30 May: KitchenAid Senior PGA Championship – Alex Čejka won his second senior major in his second start.
- 24–27 June: Bridgestone Senior Players Championship – Steve Stricker won his third senior major by six strokes over Jerry Kelly.
- 8–11 July: U.S. Senior Open – Jim Furyk won his first senior major by three strokes over Retief Goosen and Mike Weir.
- 22–25 July: The Senior Open Championship – Stephen Dodd won his first senior major by one stroke over Miguel Ángel Jiménez.

=== Charles Schwab Cup playoff events ===
- 22–24 October: Dominion Charity Classic – Bernhard Langer won in a playoff over Doug Barron, becoming the oldest winner on the PGA Tour Champions.
- 5–7 November: TimberTech Championship – Steven Alker won by two strokes over Jim Furyk and Miguel Ángel Jiménez.
- 11–14 November: Charles Schwab Cup Championship – Phil Mickelson won by one stroke over Alker.

=== Full results ===
- 2020–21 PGA Tour Champions season
- 2021 European Senior Tour

== Senior women's professional golf ==
- 29 July – 1 August: U.S. Senior Women's Open – Annika Sörenstam won by eight strokes over Liselotte Neumann.
- 26–29 August: Senior LPGA Championship – Trish Johnson won her second Senior LPGA by one stroke over Becky Morgan.

== Amateur golf ==
- 14–17 January: Latin America Amateur Championship – Cancelled
- 8–9 May: Walker Cup – The United States team won, 14–12.
- 21–26 May: NCAA Division I Women's Golf Championships – Rachel Heck (Stanford) took the individual title and Ole Miss captured their first team title.
- 28 May – 2 June: NCAA Division I Men's Golf Championships – Turk Pettit (Clemson) took the individual title and Pepperdine captured their second team title.
- 7–12 June: The Women's Amateur Championship – Louise Duncan of Scotland defeated Jóhanna Lea Lúðvíksdóttir of Iceland, 9 and 8, in the final.
- 14–19 June: The Amateur Championship – Laird Shepherd of England defeated countryman Monty Scowsill after 38 holes.
- 23–26 June: European Amateur – Christoffer Bring of Denmark won by two strokes over Ludvig Åberg of Sweden.
- 21–24 July: European Ladies Amateur Championship – Ingrid Lindblad of Sweden won by three strokes over Alexandra Försterling of Germany.
- 2–8 August: U.S. Women's Amateur – American Jensen Castle defeated Hou Yu-chiang of Taiwan, 2 and 1, in the final.
- 9–15 August: U.S. Amateur – James Piot defeated Austin Greaser, 2 and 1, in the final.
- 26–28 August: Curtis Cup – The United States team won, 12.5–7.5.
- 3–6 November: Asia-Pacific Amateur Championship – Keita Nakajima of Japan, the number one in the World Amateur Golf Ranking, defeated Kho Taichi of Hong Kong in a playoff.

Other happenings

== Golf in multi-sport events ==
- 29 July – 7 August: Summer Olympics – In the men's tournament: Xander Schauffele of the United States won the gold medal, Rory Sabbatini of Slovakia won the silver and Pan Cheng-tsung of Chinese Taipei won the bronze after a seven-man playoff. In the women's tournament: Nelly Korda of the United States won the gold medal, Mone Inami of Japan took the silver medal in a playoff over Lydia Ko of New Zealand who won bronze.

== Deaths ==
- 16 January – Jimmy Powell (born 1935), American professional golfer who had four wins on the Senior PGA Tour.
- 20 January – Lonnie Nielsen (born 1953), American professional golfer who had two wins on the Champions Tour.
- 26 January – Bob McCallister (born 1934), American professional golfer who had two wins on the PGA Tour.
- 19 February – Bill Wright (born 1936), American professional golfer who was the first African-American to win a United States Golf Association national title.
- 25 February – Lyndsay Stephen (born 1956), Australian professional golfer who had two wins on the PGA Tour of Australasia.
- 13 March – Rocky Thompson (born 1939), American professional golfer who had three wins on the Senior PGA Tour.
- 18 March – DeWitt Weaver (born 1939), American professional golfer who had two wins on the PGA Tour.
- 23 March – Bob Lewis (born 1944), American amateur golfer who finished runner-up at the 1980 U.S. Amateur.
- 29 March – Jerry McGee (born 1943), American professional golfer who had four wins on the PGA Tour.
- 6 April – Al Mengert (born 1929), American professional golfer who played on the PGA Tour.
- 23 April – Bill Johnston (born 1925), American professional golfer who had two wins on the PGA Tour.
- 23 May – Lionel Platts (born 1934), English professional golfer.
- 25 June – Brian Bamford (born 1935), English professional golfer.
- 16 July – David Snell (born 1933), English professional golfer.
- 20 September – Billy Maxwell (born 1929), American professional golfer who won the 1951 U.S. Amateur and seven PGA Tour events.
- 23 September – Bruce Fleisher (born 1948), American professional golfer who won the 1968 U.S. Amateur, one PGA Tour event and 18 Champions Tour events.
- 24 October - Fredrik Andersson Hed (born 1972), Swedish professional golfer who had one win on the European Tour.
- 28 November - Lee Elder (born 1934), American professional golfer who won four PGA Tour events and eight Senior PGA Tour events. He was also the first black golfer to play in the Masters Tournament.

== Table of results ==
This table summarizes all the results referred to above in date order.

| Dates | Tournament | Status or tour | Winner |
|---|---|---|---|
| ~~14–17 Jan~~ | Latin America Amateur Championship | Amateur men's individual tournament | Cancelled |
| 25–28 Feb | WGC-Workday Championship | World Golf Championships | (United States) Collin Morikawa |
| 11–14 Mar | The Players Championship | PGA Tour | (United States) Justin Thomas |
| 24–28 Mar | WGC-Dell Technologies Match Play | World Golf Championships | (United States) Billy Horschel |
| 1–4 Apr | ANA Inspiration | LPGA major | (Thailand) Patty Tavatanakit |
| 8–11 Apr | Masters Tournament | Men's major | (Japan) Hideki Matsuyama |
| 6–9 May | Regions Tradition | Senior major | (Germany) Alex Čejka |
| 8–9 May | Walker Cup | Great Britain & Ireland v United States men's amateur team event | United States |
| 20–23 May | PGA Championship | Men's major | (United States) Phil Mickelson |
| 21–26 May | NCAA Division I Women's Golf Championships | U.S. college championship | Ole Miss / Rachel Heck |
| 27–30 May | Senior PGA Championship | Senior major | (Germany) Alex Čejka |
| 28 May – 2 Jun | NCAA Division I Men's Golf Championships | U.S. college championship | Pepperdine / Turk Pettit |
| 3–6 Jun | U.S. Women's Open | LPGA major | (Philippines) Yuka Saso |
| 7–12 Jun | Women's Amateur Championship | Amateur women's individual tournament | (Scotland) Louise Duncan |
| 14–19 Jun | The Amateur Championship | Amateur men's individual tournament | (England) Laird Shepherd |
| 17–20 Jun | U.S. Open | Men's major | (Spain) Jon Rahm |
| 23–26 Jun | European Amateur | Amateur men's individual tournament | (Denmark) Christoffer Bring |
| 24–27 Jun | Women's PGA Championship | LPGA major | (United States) Nelly Korda |
| 24–27 Jun | Senior Players Championship | Senior major | (United States) Steve Stricker |
| 8–11 Jul | U.S. Senior Open | Senior major | (United States) Jim Furyk |
| 15–18 Jul | The Open Championship | Men's major | (United States) Collin Morikawa |
| 21–24 Jul | European Ladies Amateur | Amateur women's individual tournament | (Sweden) Ingrid Lindblad |
| 22–25 Jul | The Evian Championship | LPGA Tour and Ladies European Tour major | (Australia) Minjee Lee |
| 22–25 Jul | The Senior Open Championship | Senior major | (Wales) Stephen Dodd |
| 29 Jul – 1 Aug | Summer Olympics | Men's tournament | (United States) Xander Schauffele |
| 29 Jul – 1 Aug | U.S. Senior Women's Open | Senior women's major | (Sweden) Annika Sörenstam |
| 4–7 Aug | Summer Olympics | Women's tournament | (United States) Nelly Korda |
| 2–8 Aug | U.S. Women's Amateur | Amateur women's individual tournament | (United States) Jensen Castle |
| 5–8 Aug | WGC-FedEx St. Jude Invitational | World Golf Championships | (Mexico) Abraham Ancer |
| 9–15 Aug | U.S. Amateur | Amateur men's individual tournament | (United States) James Piot |
| 19–22 Aug | Women's British Open | LPGA Tour and Ladies European Tour major | (Sweden) Anna Nordqvist |
| 19–23 Aug | The Northern Trust | PGA Tour FedEx Cup playoff | (United States) Tony Finau |
| 26–28 Aug | Curtis Cup | Amateur women's team event | United States |
| 26–29 Aug | BMW Championship | PGA Tour FedEx Cup playoff | (United States) Patrick Cantlay |
| 26–29 Aug | Senior LPGA Championship | Senior women's major | (England) Trish Johnson |
| 2–5 Sep | Tour Championship | PGA Tour FedEx Cup playoff | (United States) Patrick Cantlay |
| 4–6 Sep | Solheim Cup | Europe v United States women's professional team event | Europe |
| 9–12 Sep | BMW PGA Championship | European Tour | (United States) Billy Horschel |
| 24–26 Sep | Ryder Cup | United States team vs. European team men's professional team event | United States |
| 22–24 Oct | Dominion Charity Classic | PGA Tour Champions Charles Schwab Cup playoff | (Germany) Bernhard Langer |
| ~~28–31 Oct~~ | WGC-HSBC Champions | World Golf Championships | Cancelled |
| 3–6 Nov | Asia-Pacific Amateur Championship | Amateur men's individual tournament | (Japan) Keita Nakajima |
| 5–7 Nov | TimberTech Championship | PGA Tour Champions Charles Schwab Cup playoff | (New Zealand) Steven Alker |
| 11–14 Nov | Charles Schwab Cup Championship | PGA Tour Champions Charles Schwab Cup playoff | (United States) Phil Mickelson |
| 18–21 Nov | DP World Tour Championship, Dubai | European Tour | (United States) Collin Morikawa |
| 18–21 Nov | CME Group Tour Championship | LPGA Tour | (South Korea) Ko Jin-young |
