= Golf at the 2018 Summer Youth Olympics – Girls' individual =

Girls' individual at the III Summer Youth Olympic Games
- Venue: Hurlingham Club
- Dates: 9–11 October
- Competitors: 32 from 32 nations

Medalists
1st place, gold medalist(s)		Grace Kim	Australia
2nd place, silver medalist(s)		Alessia Nobilio	Italy
3rd place, bronze medalist(s)		Emma Spitz	Austria

These are the results for the girls' individual event at the 2018 Summer Youth Olympics.

== Schedule ==
All times are local (UTC−3).

Date	Time	Round
Tuesday, 9 October	8:30	Round 1
Wednesday, 10 October	8:30	Round 2
Thursday, 11 October	8:30	Round 3
Thursday, 11 October	14:40	Playoff

== Results ==
Rank	Athlete	Nation	Round			Total	To par	Playoff
Rank	Athlete	Nation	1	2	3	Total	To par	Playoff
1st place, gold medalist(s)	Grace Kim	Australia	71	69	71	211	+1	
2nd place, silver medalist(s)	Alessia Nobilio	Italy	68	72	74	214	+4	−1
3rd place, bronze medalist(s)	Emma Spitz	Austria	72	70	72	214	+4	0
4	Yuka Saso	Philippines	71	74	69	214	+4	+1
5	Ela Anacona	Argentina	73	75	72	220	+10	
5	Emilie Øverås	Norway	71	76	73	220	+10	
5	Paula Kirner	Germany	73	73	74	220	+10	
8	Atthaya Thitikul	Thailand	76	74	71	221	+11	
8	Lucy Li	United States	78	70	73	221	+11	
8	An Ho-yu	Chinese Taipei	71	72	78	221	+11	
11	Lily May Humphreys	Great Britain	79	70	73	222	+12	
11	María Martínez	Mexico	71	77	74	222	+12	
13	Lauren Walsh	Ireland	75	73	75	223	+13	
13	Céleste Dao	Canada	75	72	76	223	+13	
15	Sarah Hricíková	Czech Republic	79	72	73	224	+14	
16	Ribka Vania	Indonesia	74	75	76	225	+15	
16	Elina Saksa	Finland	75	74	76	225	+15	
18	Blanca Fernández	Spain	77	77	74	228	+18	
19	Elena Moosmann	Switzerland	78	78	73	229	+19	
20	Mathilde Claisse	France	78	78	75	231	+21	
20	Juliana Hung	New Zealand	77	77	77	231	+21	
22	Georgia Oboh	Nigeria	81	82	71	234	+24	
22	Yang Jieming	China	85	74	75	234	+24	
22	Kaiyuree Moodley	South Africa	77	81	76	234	+24	
22	Anne Wennerwald Normann	Denmark	83	75	76	234	+24	
22	Margaux Marie Appart	Belgium	78	78	78	234	+24	
27	Kagetsu Tsuruse	Japan	79	77	79	235	+25	
28	Lauren Holmey	Netherlands	81	81	77	239	+29	
29	Hulda Clara Gestsdóttir	Iceland	81	82	82	245	+35	
30	Amanda Linnér	Sweden	84	83	79	246	+36	
31	Natalie Mok	Papua New Guinea	81	79	92	252	+42	
32	Reema Al-Heloo	United Arab Emirates	88	84	88	260	+50	
