= 2022 Curtis Cup =

Golf competition in Ardmore, Pennsylvania

42nd Curtis Cup Match
- Dates: June 10–12, 2022
- Venue: Merion Golf Club
- Location: Ardmore, Pennsylvania
- Captains: Sarah LeBrun Ingram (USA); Elaine Ratcliffe (GB&I)
(United States)	15 1/2	4 1/2	(United Kingdom) (Republic of Ireland)
- United States wins the Curtis Cup

Location map
- Location in the United States Location in Pennsylvania

The 42nd Curtis Cup Match was played from June 10–12, 2022 at Merion Golf Club, Ardmore, Pennsylvania. It was played less than a year after the previous contest, at Conwy Golf Club in 2021, which had been delayed because of the COVID-19 pandemic. The USA team retained the Curtis Cup by a score of 15 1/2 to 4 1/2.

== Format ==
The contest is a three-day competition, with three foursomes and three fourball matches on each of the first two days, and eight singles matches on the final day, a total of 20 points.

Each of the 20 matches is worth one point in the larger team competition. If a match ends all square after the 18th hole extra holes were not played. Rather, each side earned 1/2 point toward their team total. The team that accumulates at least 10 1/2 points won the competition. In the event of a tie, the current holder retains the Cup.

== Teams ==
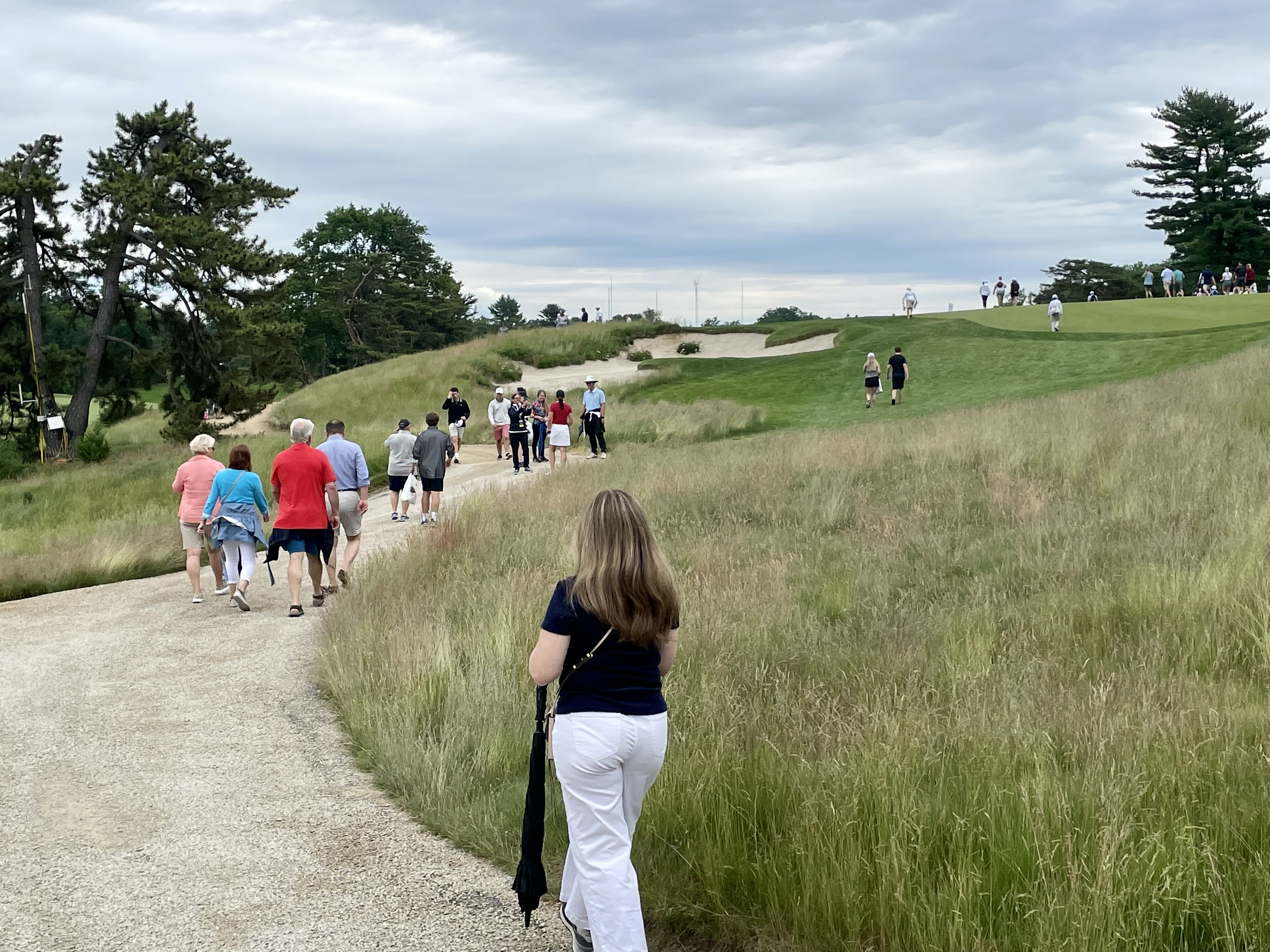
Spectators at the 2022 Curtis Cup

Eight players for USA and Great Britain & Ireland will participate in the event plus one non-playing captain for each team.

Sarah LeBrun Ingram and Elaine Ratcliffe were named captains of the US and "Great Britain and Ireland" teams. They had captained the teams at Conwy Golf Club in 2021.

Jensen Castle, the 2021 U.S. Women's Amateur champion, and Rose Zhang, the recipient of the 2021 Mark H. McCormack Medal, received automatic places in the US team. Rachel Heck and Rachel Kuehn also gained automatic selection based on the World Amateur Golf Ranking on April 6, 2022. The remaining four places were announced on April 15, 2022.

USA
Name	Age	Rank	Notes
Sarah LeBrun Ingram	c. 56	–	non-playing captain
Amari Avery	18	15
Jensen Castle	21	55	played in 2021
Megha Ganne	18	17
Rachel Heck	20	4	played in 2021
Rachel Kuehn	21	11	played in 2021
Emilia Migliaccio	22	19	played in 2021
Latanna Stone	20	42
Rose Zhang	19	1	played in 2021

The Great Britain & Ireland team was announced on April 25, 2022. Hannah Darling and Caley McGinty were automatic selections as the top two in the World Amateur Golf Ranking on April 21, 2022.

& Great Britain & Ireland
Name	Age	Rank	Notes
(England) Elaine Ratcliffe	49	–	non-playing captain
(Scotland) Hannah Darling	18	14	played in 2021
(Scotland) Louise Duncan	22	48	played in 2021
(England) Annabell Fuller	19	44	played in 2018 and 2021
(England) Charlotte Heath	20	59	played in 2021
(England) Caley McGinty	21	10	played in 2021
(England) Emily Price	22	76
(Republic of Ireland) Lauren Walsh	21	46	played in 2021
(England) Amelia Williamson	21	47

Note: "Rank" is the World Amateur Golf Ranking as of the start of the Cup.

== Friday's matches ==
=== Morning fourballs ===
&	Results
Darling/Fuller	(United States) 1 up	Heck/Kuehn
McGinty/Walsh	(United States) 3 & 2	Avery/Ganne
Duncan/Heath	(United Kingdom) (Republic of Ireland) 2 & 1	Zhang/Migliaccio
1	Session	2
1	Overall	2

=== Afternoon foursomes ===
&	Results
Darling/Fuller	(United States) 5 & 3	Castle/Stone
McGinty/Price	(United States) 3 & 2	Kuehn/Avery
Heath/Williamson	(United States) 4 & 2	Zhang/Heck
0	Session	3
1	Overall	5

== Saturday's matches ==
=== Morning fourballs ===
&	Results
McGinty/Walsh	(United Kingdom) (Republic of Ireland) 5 & 4	Castle/Kuehn
Darling/Fuller	(United States) 2 & 1	Avery/Ganne
Heath/Duncan	(United States) 1 up	Migliaccio/Stone
1	Session	2
2	Overall	7

=== Afternoon foursomes ===
&	Results
McGinty/Walsh	halved	Heck/Zhang
Williamson/Price	(United States) 2 up	Avery/Kuehn
Darling/Fuller	(United Kingdom) (Republic of Ireland) 2 & 1	Castle/Stone
1 1/2	Session	1 1/2
3 1/2	Overall	8 1/2

== Sunday's singles matches ==
&	Results
Louise Duncan	(United States) 7 & 5	Rose Zhang
Caley McGinty	(United States) 2 & 1	Rachel Kuehn
Lauren Walsh	(United States) 2 & 1	Rachel Heck
Hannah Darling	(United States) 2 & 1	Jensen Castle
Charlotte Heath	(United States) 1 up	Latanna Stone
Annabell Fuller	(United States) 6 & 5	Emilia Migliaccio
Amelia Williamson	(United States) 2 & 1	Megha Ganne
Emily Price	(United Kingdom) (Republic of Ireland) 4 & 3	Amari Avery
1	Session	7
4 1/2	Overall	15 1/2
