= Golf at the 2018 Summer Youth Olympics – Mixed team =

Mixed team at the III Summer Youth Olympic Games
- Venue: Hurlingham Club
- Dates: 13–15 October
- Competitors: 64 from 32 nations

Medalists
1st place, gold medalist(s)		Vanchai Luangnitikul; Atthaya Thitikul; Thailand
2nd place, silver medalist(s)		Akshay Bhatia; Lucy Li; United States
3rd place, bronze medalist(s)		Mateo Fernández de Oliveira; Ela Anacona; Argentina

These are the results for the mixed team event at the 2018 Summer Youth Olympics.

== Schedule ==
All times are local (UTC−3).

Date	Time	Round
Saturday, 13 October	8:30	Round 1
Sunday, 14 October	8:30	Round 2
Monday, 15 October	8:30	Round 3

== Results ==
Rank	Nation	Athletes	Round				Total	To par
Rank	Nation	Athletes	1	2	3 (F)	3 (M)	Total	To par
1st place, gold medalist(s)	Thailand	Atthaya Thitikul; Vanchai Luangnitikul	60	68	69	71	268	−12
2nd place, silver medalist(s)	United States	Lucy Li; Akshay Bhatia	62	70	71	66	269	−11
3rd place, bronze medalist(s)	Argentina	Ela Anacona; Mateo Fernández de Oliveira	65	70	69	69	273	−7
4	Austria	Emma Spitz; Christoph Bleier	66	70	70	72	278	−2
4	Switzerland	Elena Moosmann; Nicola Gerhardsen	62	71	73	72	278	−2
4	Italy	Alessia Nobilio; Andrea Romano	57	72	74	75	278	−2
7	Denmark	Anne Wennerwald Normann; Nicolai Højgaard	64	73	73	70	280	E
8	Mixed-NOCs	Ribka Vania (INA); Park Sang-ha (KOR)	66	69	75	73	283	+3
9	Japan	Kagetsu Tsuruse; Ryo Hisatsune	64	74	76	70	284	+4
9	Great Britain	Lily May Humphreys; Joe Pagdin	64	73	74	73	284	+4
9	Australia	Grace Kim; Karl Vilips	65	71	76	72	284	+4
12	Norway	Emilie Øverås; Bård Bjørnevik Skogen	66	77	73	69	285	+5
13	Spain	Blanca Fernández; David Puig	67	74	75	70	286	+6
13	Chinese Taipei	An Ho-yu; Lin Chau-tai	67	73	72	74	286	+6
13	Germany	Paula Kirner; Lukas Buller	66	74	74	72	286	+6
13	Ireland	Lauren Walsh; David Kitt	63	72	74	77	286	+6
17	Mexico	María Martínez; Alejandro Madariaga	65	79	74	70	288	+8
17	China	Yang Jieming; Xie Qiantong	67	73	76	72	288	+8
17	Finland	Elina Saksa; Eemil Alajärvi	65	73	74	76	288	+8
20	Czech Republic	Sarah Hricíková; Václav Tichý	67	78	72	72	289	+9
20	Philippines	Yuka Saso; Carl Jano Corpus	66	75	74	74	289	+9
22	Canada	Céleste Dao; William Duquette	65	77	74	74	290	+10
23	South Africa	Kaiyuree Moodley; Cole Stevens	69	75	76	75	295	+15
23	Sweden	Amanda Linnér; Ludvig Eriksson	65	79	78	73	295	+15
25	Belgium	Margaux Marie Appart; Jean de Wouters	70	75	78	73	296	+16
26	New Zealand	Juliana Hung; Jimmy Zheng	69	79	77	73	298	+18
26	Netherlands	Lauren Holmey; Jerry Ji	64	77	82	75	298	+18
28	Iceland	Hulda Clara Gestsdóttir; Ingvar Andri Magnússon	68	88	77	69	302	+22
29	France	Mathilde Claisse; Thomas Boulanger	66	79	80	78	303	+23
30	Nigeria	Georgia Oboh; Jordan Thompson	71	79	76	87	313	+33
31	United Arab Emirates	Reema Al-Heloo; Mohamed Al-Hajeri	72	84	84	77	317	+37
32	Papua New Guinea	Natalie Mok; Terrence Coleman	75	88	81	85	329	+49
