= Rachel Kuehn =

American professional golfer (born 2001)

Personal information
- Nationality: United States
- Born: June 10, 2001 (age 25) Asheville, North Carolina

Career
- Sport: Golf
- College: Wake Forest University
- Turned professional: 2024
- Current tour: Epson Tour

Best results in LPGA major championships
- Chevron Championship: DNP
- Women's PGA C'ship: DNP
- U.S. Women's Open: DNP
- Women's British Open: DNP
- Evian Championship: T58: 2024

Achievements and awards
- ACC Player of the Year: 2022, 2023
- ACC Scholar Athlete of the Year: 2023

Rachel Kuehn (born June 6, 2001) is an American professional golfer.

== Early life and family ==
Kuehn was born 2001 in Asheville, North Carolina to an athletic family. Her grandfather Jack Corrie represented Venezuela in the 1958 Eisenhower Trophy and played golf and basketball at MIT. Her mother, Brenda Corrie-Kuehn, was a Hall of Fame golfer at Wake Forest and represented both her native Dominican Republic and the USA in the Espirito Santo Trophy a total of four times, as well as two Curtis Cups. Her father, Eric, and two uncles were Division I baseball players. Her brother Corrie played collegiate golf at Rhodes College. Kuehn herself was a state champion in tennis before focusing on golf.

Her mother, Brenda, had an accomplished amateur career and twice claimed medalist honors in the U.S. Women's Mid-Amateur (1995 and 1996). She appeared in the U.S. Women's Amateur 16 times, in the U.S. Women's Open 9 times and was runner-up at the Women's Mid-Amateur in 1995. She secured the clinching point in the 1998 Curtis Cup. She made headlines in the 2001 U.S. Women's Open at Pine Needles by playing while eight months pregnant with Rachel. Brenda felt a contraction while hitting her tee shot on the 11th hole during the opening round, and eight days later delivered her daughter.

== Amateur career ==
Kuehn appeared in the 2018 Espirito Santo Trophy for the Dominican Republic alongside her mother. She also represented the Dominican Republic at the 2019 Pan American Games in Peru.

Kuehn was enrolled at Wake Forest University 2019–2024 and played golf with the Wake Forest Demon Deacons women's golf team. She was All-American every season and Atlantic Coast Conference Player of the Year back-to-back in 2022 and 2023. Kuehn's victory in the 2019 Annika Intercollegiate made her part of the first mother-daughter duo in program history to claim individual titles, and in 2024 the first such duo to win the ACC Women's Golf Championship.

In 2020, Kuehn won the North and South Women's Amateur at Pinehurst No. 2. and reached the round of 16 in the U.S. Women's Amateur. In 2021, Kuehn earned medalist honors at the U.S. Women's Amateur, shooting a five-under 67 at Westchester Country Club for a six-under 138 total, two shots better than Kennedy Pedigo.

Kuehn appeared on the victorious American team at the 2021 Curtis Cup at Conwy Golf Club in Wales, where she defeated Scotland's Louise Duncan to secure the winning point. She again secured the clinching point in the 2022 Curtis Cup, when she closed out Caleb McGinty 2 and 1.

Playing for the United States, Kuehn earned the silver medal at the 2022 Espirito Santo Trophy in France together with Rachel Heck and Rose Zhang.

== Professional career ==
Kuehn turned professional in 2024.

In 2025, Kuehn joined the Epson Tour, where she recorded three top-10 finishes including a season-best tied 2nd at the Murphy USA El Dorado Shootout, and finished 26th in the season rankings. In 2026, she lost a playoff to Mirabel Ting at the Smoky Mountain Championship.

== Amateur wins ==
- 2015 PKBGT Invitational
- 2017 CGA Carolinas Amateur Championship, Bubba Conlee Tournament
- 2019 Annika Intercollegiate
- 2020 North and South Women's Amateur, Ladies National Golf Association Amateur
- 2021 Palmetto Intercollegiate, Ruth's Chris Tar Heel Invite
- 2022 Northrop Grumman Regional Challenge, Jackson T. Stephens Cup Stroke
- 2023 Valspar Augusta Invitational
- 2024 ACC Women's Golf Championship, NCAA DI Bermuda Run Regional

== Playoff record ==
Epson Tour playoff record (0–1)

No.	Year	Tournament	Opponent	Result	Ref.
1	2026	Smoky Mountain Championship	(Malaysia) Mirabel Ting	Ting won with birdie on the first extra hole	

== Team appearances ==
Amateur

- Espirito Santo Trophy (representing the Dominican Republic): 2018
- Espirito Santo Trophy (representing the United States): 2022, 2023
- Curtis Cup (representing the United States): 2021 (winners), 2022, 2024
- Arnold Palmer Cup (representing the United States): 2020, 2021 (winners), 2022, 2023 (winners), 2024 (winners)
