= Emma Spitz =

Austrian professional golfer (born 2000)

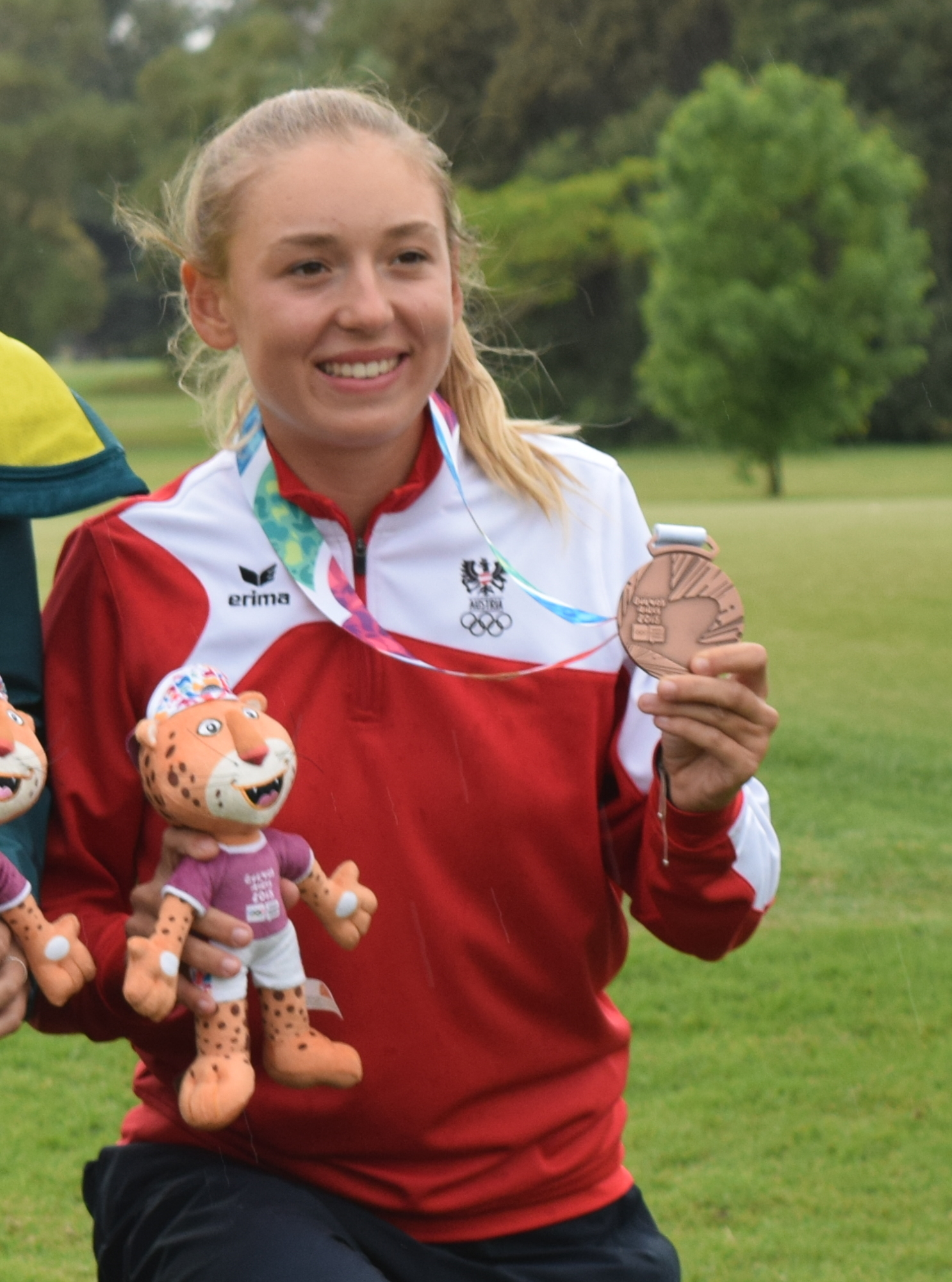
- Spitz at the 2018 Summer Youth Olympics

Personal information
- Nationality: Austria
- Born: 10 April 2000 (age 26) Vienna, Austria
- Height: 5 ft 5 in (165 cm)

Career
- Sport: Golf
- College: UCLA
- Turned professional: 2022
- Current tours: Ladies European Tour; Epson Tour

Best results in LPGA major championships
- Chevron Championship: DNP
- Women's PGA C'ship: DNP
- U.S. Women's Open: T59: 2023
- Women's British Open: T55: 2025
- Evian Championship: DNP
Medal record
Youth Olympic Games
Bronze medal – third place	2018 Buenos Aires	Girls' individual

Emma Spitz (born 10 April 2000) is an Austrian professional golfer and Ladies European Tour player. She was runner-up at the 2024 Amundi German Masters. In 2018, she became the first Austrian to win The R&A's Girls Amateur Championship.

== Amateur career ==
Spitz enjoyed a prolific amateur career. She won the Austrian Stroke Play Championship in 2015, 2016, 2020 and 2021, and was runner up at the event in 2018 and 2019. In 2017 she was runner-up at the German Girls Open and the Austrian International Amateur, which she subsequently won in 2020. She has won the Austrian Match Play three times, and the Italian International Amateur Championship twice. She was runner up at the 2018 Slovenian Amateur Championship, and won the event in 2019.

Spitz played for the National Team starting in 2013 and represented Austria at five European Girls/Ladies Team Championship between 2015 and 2019, and at the Espirito Santo Trophy in 2016 and 2018.

She represented Europe at the Junior Solheim Cup in 2015 and 2017, the Junior Ryder Cup in 2016 and 2018, the Junior Vagliano Trophy in 2015, the Patsy Hankins Trophy in 2016, and the Vagliano Trophy in 2019.

In 2018, Spitz defeated fellow Austrian Isabella Holpfer, 2 and 1, to win the British Girls Amateur Championship at Ardglass, Northern Ireland. She qualified for the 2019 Women's British Open at Woburn Golf Club in England, but missed the cut.

At the 2018 Youth Olympic Games in Argentina, she lost a playoff for the silver medal and had to settle for bronze in the Girls event and a 4th place in the Mixed team event. She finished fourth at the 2020 European Ladies Amateur.

== College career ==
Spitz enrolled at UCLA in 2019 as a psychology major. As a freshman, she was an Annika Award finalist, a WGCA and Golfweek First Team All-American, and led UCLA in scoring average.

She made her U.S. Women's Open debut by virtue of being number 20 in the World Amateur Golf Ranking in 2020 at Champions Golf Club, but missed the cut.

Spitz played in the Arnold Palmer Cup in 2020 and 2021. She finished 3rd at the 2021 Augusta National Women's Amateur and was runner-up one stroke behind Rachel Heck of Stanford at the 2021 NCAA Division I Women's Golf Championships.

== Professional career ==
Waiting until she was in the top five in the World Amateur Golf Ranking to ensure her place at Final Qualifying tournament for the LPGA and LET, Spitz turned professional in August 2022. She made her professional debut at Skaftö Open, where she tied for 10th place. The following week, she led the Åland 100 Ladies Open after the first round together with Ursula Wikström, and ultimately finished 4th.

Spitz secured her card for the 2023 Ladies European Tour by finishing T6 at Q-School. She earned a spot in the field in the 2023 U.S. Women's Open at Pebble Beach Golf Links by winning the European qualifier held at Golf Club de Naxhelet in Belgium.

== Amateur wins ==
- 2015 Austrian Stroke Play Championship, Austrian Match Play, Italian International Amateur Championship
- 2016 Austrian Stroke Play Championship, European Nations Cup - Copa Sotogrande
- 2017 Austrian Match Play
- 2018 Girls Amateur Championship, Italian International Ladies Amateur Championship
- 2019 Slovenian Amateur Championship
- 2020 Austrian Stroke Play Championship, Austrian Stroke Play U21, Austrian International Amateur, Austrian Match Play, Bruin Wave Invitational
- 2021 Austrian Stroke Play Championship, NCAA Simpsonville Regional
- 2022 Chambers Bay Invitational

== Playoff record ==
LET playoff record (0–1)

No.	Year	Tournament	Opponent	Result
1	2024	Amundi German Masters	(Germany) Alexandra Försterling	Lost to birdie on second extra hole

== Results in LPGA majors ==
Results not in chronological order

Tournament	2019	2020	2021	2022	2023	2024	2025
Chevron Championship							
U.S. Women's Open		CUT			T59		
Women's PGA Championship							
The Evian Championship		NT					
Women's British Open	CUT					T71	T55

Did not play

CUT = missed the half-way cut
NT = no tournament
T = tied

== Team appearances ==
Amateur

- European Young Masters (representing Austria): 2014
- Junior Vagliano Trophy (representing the Continent of Europe): 2015 (winners)
- Junior Solheim Cup (representing Europe): 2015, 2017
- Junior Ryder Cup (representing Europe): 2016, 2018
- Patsy Hankins Trophy (representing Europe): 2016
- Espirito Santo Trophy (representing Austria): 2016, 2018
- Summer Youth Olympics Mixed team event (representing Austria): 2018
- European Girls' Team Championship (representing Austria): 2015, 2017
- European Ladies' Team Championship (representing Austria): 2016, 2018, 2019, 2022
- Vagliano Trophy (representing the Continent of Europe): 2019 (winners)
- Arnold Palmer Cup (representing the International team): 2020 (winners), 2021
