= 2021 Women's British Open =

Golf tournament

2021 AIG Women's Open
Tournament information
- Dates: 19–22 August 2021
- Location: Carnoustie, Angus, Scotland; 56.497°N 2.717°W
- Course: Carnoustie Golf Links
- Organized by: The R&A
- Tours: Ladies European Tour; LPGA Tour

Statistics
- Par: 72
- Length: 6,840 yards (6,250 m)
- Field: 144 players, 66 after cut
- Cut: 145 (+1)
- Prize fund: US$5.8 million
- Winner's share: $870,000

Champion
- (Sweden) Anna Nordqvist
- 276 (−12)
- Location in the United Kingdom Location in Scotland

The 2021 AIG Women's British Open was played from 19 to 22 August in Scotland at Carnoustie Golf Links. It was the 45th Women's British Open, the 21st as a major championship on the LPGA Tour, and the second championship held under a sponsorship agreement with AIG, which has rebranded the championship to remove the word "British" and run as the 2021 AIG Women's Open.

It was the second Women's British Open at Carnoustie, following the course's event debut in 2011, which was won by Taiwanese golfer Yani Tseng. The R&A also allowed the return of spectators, after the 2020 Women's British Open was played behind closed doors due to the COVID-19 pandemic in the United Kingdom.

== Field ==
The field was 144 players. As with previous tournaments, most players earned exemptions based on past performance on the Ladies European Tour, the LPGA Tour, previous major championships, or with a high ranking in the Women's World Golf Rankings. The rest of the field earned entry by successfully competing in qualifying tournaments open to any female golfer, professional or amateur, with a low handicap.

Qualification criteria for the 2021 Women's British Open were as follows:

1. Winners of the Women's British Open, aged 60 or younger at the scheduled end of the championship, provided they are still active members of a recognised tour.

Laura Davies, Georgia Hall (3,5), Ariya Jutanugarn (7,10,12), Stacy Lewis (5,7), Mo Martin, Catriona Matthew, Inbee Park (2,5,7,10), Sophia Popov (2,7), Hinako Shibuno (7)

- In-Kyung Kim, Jiyai Shin (7), and Yani Tseng did not play,

2. The top 10 finishers and ties from the 2020 Women's British Open.

Chun In-gee (7,15), Austin Ernst (5,7,10), Andrea Lee, Minjee Lee (5,7,10,15), Caroline Masson, Jennifer Song (5), Jasmine Suwannapura (5)

- Momoko Ueda did not play

3. The top 15 on the final 2020 LET Order of Merit.

Manon De Roey, Laura Fünfstück, Maha Haddioui, Kylie Henry, Céline Herbin, Alice Hewson, Nuria Iturrioz, Stephanie Kyriacou (10), Azahara Muñoz, Sanna Nuutinen, Emily Kristine Pedersen, Luna Sobrón, Anne Van Dam

- Julia Engström did not play

4. The top 8 on the 2021 LET Order of Merit not already exempt as of 15 July.

Olivia Cowan, Gabriella Cowley, Annabel Dimmock, Leonie Harm, Felicity Johnson, Ursula Wikström, Chloe Williams, Christine Wolf

5. The top 25 on the final 2020 LPGA official money list.

Céline Boutier, Ashleigh Buhai, Carlota Ciganda (7), Jodi Ewart Shadoff, Ally Ewing (7,10), Nasa Hataoka (7,10), Brooke Henderson (7,10), Moriya Jutanugarn (7,10), Danielle Kang (7,14), Cheyenne Knight, Kim Sei-young (7,14), Lydia Ko (7,10), Nelly Korda (7,10,14,19), Jennifer Kupcho (7), Gaby López, Yealimi Noh, Anna Nordqvist (15), Amy Olson (7), Mel Reid (7), Ryu So-yeon (7,13), Madelene Sagström, Angela Stanford (15)

- Mirim Lee (7,13), Park Hee-young and Yu Liu did not play

6. The top 32 on the 2021 Race to the CME Globe points list not already exempt under criteria 5. as of 15 July.

Marina Alex, Brittany Altomare (7), Pajaree Anannarukarn (10), Ana Belac, Chella Choi, Cydney Clanton, Jenny Coleman, Matilda Castren (10), Perrine Delacour, Kristen Gillman, Hannah Green (7,14), Jaye Marie Green, Mina Harigae, Esther Henseleit, Ji Eun-hee, Sarah Kemp, Megan Khang (7), Christina Kim, Katherine Kirk, Jessica Korda (7,10), Bronte Law, Alison Lee (10), Lee Jeong-eun (7,12), Lee Mi-hyang, Brittany Lincicome, Nanna Koerstz Madsen, Leona Maguire, Wichanee Meechai, Giulia Molinaro, Su-Hyun Oh, Ryann O'Toole (10), Pornanong Phatlum, Gerina Piller, Sarah Schmelzel, Lizette Salas (7), Yuka Saso (7,10,12), Jenny Shin, Lauren Stephenson, Elizabeth Szokol, Emma Talley, Patty Tavatanakit (7,10,13), Lexi Thompson (7), Albane Valenzuela, Amy Yang (7), Angel Yin

- Shanshan Feng (7), Hsu Wei-ling (10), Ko Jin-young (7,10,13,15), Kim Hyo-joo (7,10), and Lin Xiyu did not play

7. The top 50 in the Women's World Golf Rankings as of 12 July.

Ayaka Furue, Charley Hull, M. J. Hur, Kim A-lim (12), Park Sung-hyun (12,14)

- Choi Hye-jin, Mone Inami, Jang Ha-na, Lim Hee-jeong, Park Hyun-kyung, Park Min-ji, Ryu Hae-ran, Ai Suzuki, and Miyū Yamashita did not play

8. The top 3 on the JLPGA Money List not already exempt as of the Suntory Ladies Open (13 June)

Erika Hara

9. The top 2 on the JLPGA Money List not already exempt as of 29 June

10. Winners of any recognised LET or LPGA Tour events in the 2021 calendar year.

Pia Babnik, Lucie Malchirand, Lee-Anne Pace, Marianne Skarpnord, Atthaya Thitikul

11. Winners of the 2020 JLPGA Money List and KLPGA Money List.

12. Winners of the last five editions of the U.S. Women's Open

13. Winners of the last five editions of the ANA Inspiration

Pernilla Lindberg

14. Winners of the last five editions of the Women's PGA Championship

15. Winners of the last five editions of The Evian Championship

16. The leading two (not otherwise exempt) in the 2021 Suntory Ladies Open

Serena Aoki

17. The 2020 Women's Amateur Asia-Pacific champion, 2020 and 2021 Women's Amateur Championship champions, 2020 and 2021 U.S. Women's Amateur champions, 2020 and 2021 European Ladies Amateur Championship champions, the 2021 Augusta National Women's Amateur champion, the 2020 Mark H. McCormack Medal winner, and the highest ranked women in the World Amateur Golf Ranking from Great Britain and Ireland as of week 25, and provided they are still amateurs at the time of the Championship.

Aline Krauter (a), Louise Duncan (a), Tsubasa Kajitani (a), Ingrid Lindblad (a), Lauren Walsh (a), Rose Zhang (a)

- Paula Schulz-Hanssen and Jensen Castle did not play

18. Any player who did not compete in the previous year's Women's British Open due to maternity, who subsequently received an extension of membership for the maternity from the player's home tour in the previous year, provided she was otherwise qualified to compete in the previous year's Women's British Open.

19. 2021 Women's Olympic Golf gold medallist.

20. The leading five players (not otherwise exempt) in the 2021 Trust Golf Women's Scottish Open

Whitney Hillier, Haeji Kang, Karolin Lampert, Kelsey Macdonald, Prima Thammaraks

Qualifiers: Aditi Ashok, Nicole Broch Larsen, Trichat Cheenglab, Ssu-Chia Cheng, Gemma Dryburgh, Cloe Frankish, Annabell Fuller (a), Johanna Gustavsson, Muni He, Paula Reto, Kirsten Rudgeley (a), Agathe Sauzon, Magdalena Simmermacher, Marissa Steen, Pannarat Thanapolboonyaras, Lindsey Weaver

== Course ==
The par-72 2021 course layout at Carnoustie Golf Links was 350 yards longer than the set-up for the 2011 Women's British Open, also held at Carnoustie. It was now 6,840 yards (6,254m)

Hole	1	2	3	4	5	6	7	8	9	Out	10	11	12	13	14	15	16	17	18	In	Total
Yards	389	435	325	375	387	520	380	167	416	3,394	422	351	503	159	513	437	220	421	420	3,446	6,840
Par	4	4	4	4	4	5	4	3	4	36	4	4	5	3	5	4	3	4	4	36	72

== Round summaries ==
=== First round ===
Thursday, 19 August 2021

Place	Player	Score	To par
T1	(South Korea) Kim Sei-young	67	−5
T1	(United States) Nelly Korda	67	−5
T1	(Sweden) Madelene Sagström	67	−5
T4	(Scotland) Louise Duncan (a)	68	−4
T4	(England) Georgia Hall	68	−4
T4	(United States) Andrea Lee	68	−4
T4	(Philippines) Yuka Saso	68	−4
T8	(Spain) Carlota Ciganda	69	−3
T8	(United States) Lizette Salas	69	−3
T8	(United States) Lexi Thompson	69	−3

=== Second round ===
Friday, 20 August 2021

Place	Player	Score	To par
T1	(England) Georgia Hall	68-69=137	−7
T1	(United States) Mina Harigae	70-67=137	−7
T3	(South Korea) Kim Sei-young	67-71=138	−6
T3	(United States) Lizette Salas	69-69=138	−6
T5	(Thailand) Moriya Jutanugarn	72-67=139	−5
T5	(Denmark) Nanna Koerstz Madsen	70-69=139	−5
T5	(Republic of Ireland) Leona Maguire	72-67=139	−5
T5	(Thailand) Wichanee Meechai	71-68=139	−5
T5	(United States) Yealimi Noh	70-69=139	−5
T5	(Philippines) Yuka Saso	68-71=139	−5
T5	(United States) Lexi Thompson	69-70=139	−5

=== Third round ===
Saturday, 21 August 2021

Place	Player	Score	To par
T1	(Denmark) Nanna Koerstz Madsen	70-69-68=207	−9
T1	(Sweden) Anna Nordqvist	71-71-65=207	−9
3	(United States) Lizette Salas	69-69-70=208	−8
T4	(Scotland) Louise Duncan (a)	68-73-68=209	−7
T4	(Finland) Sanna Nuutinen	70-71-68=209	−7
T4	(Sweden) Madelene Sagström	67-73-69=209	−7
T4	(United States) Lexi Thompson	69-70-70=209	−7
T8	(England) Georgia Hall	68-69-73=210	−6
T8	(Canada) Brooke Henderson	71-69-70=210	−6
T8	(Thailand) Ariya Jutanugarn	71-71-68=210	−6
T8	(Thailand) Moriya Jutanugarn	72-67-71=210	−6
T8	(South Korea) Kim Sei-young	67-71-72=210	−6
T8	(United States) Nelly Korda	67-73-70=210	−6
T8	(United States) Yealimi Noh	70-69-71=210	−6

=== Final round ===
Sunday, 22 August 2021

Place	Player	Score	To par	Prize money (US$)
1	(Sweden) Anna Nordqvist	71-71-65-69=276	−12	870,000
T2	(England) Georgia Hall	68-69-73-67=277	−11	409,135
T2	(Sweden) Madelene Sagström	67-73-69-68=277	−11	409,135
T2	(United States) Lizette Salas	69-69-70-69=277	−11	409,135
T5	(Australia) Minjee Lee	71-69-72-66=278	−10	219,787
T5	(Denmark) Nanna Koerstz Madsen	70-69-68-71=278	−10	219,787
T7	(Germany) Leonie Harm	70-73-69-67=279	−9	154,918
T7	(Thailand) Patty Tavatanakit	71-72-69-67=279	−9	154,918
9	(Thailand) Moriya Jutanugarn	72-67-71-70=280	−8	129,855
T10	(Thailand) Ariya Jutanugarn	71-71-68-71=281	−7	113,635
T10	(United States) Marissa Steen	73-70-69-69=281	−7	113,635
T10	(Scotland) Louise Duncan (a)	68-73-68-72=281	−7	0

==== Scorecard ====
Hole	1	2	3	4	5	6	7	8	9	10	11	12	13	14	15	16	17	18
Par	4	4	4	4	4	5	4	3	4	4	4	5	3	5	4	3	4	4
(Sweden) Nordqvist	−9	−9	−9	−9	−9	−10	−10	−11	−12	−12	−12	−11	−11	−12	−12	−12	−12	−12
(England) Hall	−6	−6	−6	−6	−6	−8	−9	−8	−7	−7	−8	−10	−10	−11	−11	−11	−11	−11
(Sweden) Sagström	−7	−7	−7	−7	−7	−8	−8	−8	−9	−8	−9	−10	−10	−11	−11	−11	−12	−11
(United States) Salas	−9	−9	−9	−9	−9	−10	−10	−10	−10	−10	−10	−10	−10	−11	−11	−11	−11	−11
(Australia) Lee	−5	−5	−6	−6	−6	−7	−8	−8	−8	−8	−9	−9	−10	−10	−10	−11	−11	−10
(Denmark) Madsen	−9	−9	−9	−10	−9	−10	−10	−10	−10	−10	−11	−12	−12	−13	−12	−12	−12	−10
(Thailand) Tavatanakit	−4	−5	−5	−6	−5	−6	−6	−6	−6	−5	−6	−7	−8	−9	−9	−9	−9	−9
(Germany) Harm	−4	−5	−6	−6	−5	−6	−6	−6	−6	−6	−6	−7	−7	−8	−8	−8	−8	−9
(Thailand) M. Jutanugarn	−7	−7	−7	−7	−7	−7	−8	−7	−7	−6	−7	−7	−7	−8	−9	−8	−8	−8
(United States) Steen	−5	−5	−5	−5	−5	−6	−6	−6	−6	−6	−6	−6	−6	−6	−7	−7	−7	−7
(Thailand) A. Jutanugarn	−7	−7	−7	−7	−6	−7	−7	−7	−7	−7	−7	−7	−7	−8	−8	−7	−7	−7
(Scotland) Duncan (a)	−8	−8	−8	−8	−8	−8	−8	−8	−9	−8	−9	−9	−9	−9	−9	−8	−8	−7

Cumulative tournament scores, relative to par

Eagle	Birdie	Bogey	Double bogey
