= Annabell Fuller =

English professional golfer (born 2002)

Personal information
- Nationality: England
- Born: 9 May 2002 (age 24) London, England
- Height: 5 ft 8 in (173 cm)

Career
- Sport: Golf
- College: University of Florida
- Turned professional: 2023
- Current tour: Ladies European Tour (joined 2024)

Best results in LPGA major championships
- Chevron Championship: DNP
- Women's PGA C'ship: DNP
- U.S. Women's Open: CUT: 2022
- Women's British Open: T58: 2026
- Evian Championship: DNP

Annabell Fuller (born 9 May 2002) is an English professional golfer and Ladies European Tour player. As an amateur, she played in the Curtis Cup three times, won the European Ladies' Team Championship twice, was runner-up at the 2020 Women's Amateur Championship, and made the cut at the 2021 Women's British Open.

== Amateur career ==
Fuller had a successful international amateur career. In 2017, she was runner-up at the Annika Invitational Europe and 3rd at both the European Nations Cup – Copa Sotogrande and the German Girls Open. In 2018, she was runner-up at the Portuguese International Ladies Amateur Championship and the English Women's Amateur Championship. In 2019, she won the Major Champions Invitational, finished 4th at the Annika Invitational USA, and 3rd at the Rolex Tournament of Champions.

In August 2020, Fuller won the English Women's Open Amateur Stroke Play Championship at Burnham and Berrow Golf Club, finishing three strokes ahead of her nearest challenger. The following week she reached the final of the Women's Amateur Championship, losing by 1 hole to Aline Krauter.

Fuller represented Great Britain and Ireland in the 2018 Curtis Cup, 2021 Curtis Cup, 2022 Curtis Cup and the 2019 Vagliano Trophy, and represented Europe in the Patsy Hankins Trophy, the Junior Ryder Cup and the Junior Solheim Cup. She was a two-time gold medalist for England at the European Ladies' Team Championship, in 2021 and 2022.

Fuller attended the University of Florida and played for the Florida Gators women's golf team between spring 2020 and fall 2023. She won the 2021 Florida Gators Invitational.

She had a handicap of +7 and rose into the top-25 of the World Amateur Golf Ranking, and was one of three amateurs to make the cut in the 2021 Women's British Open at Carnoustie.

== Professional career ==
Fuller turned professional after she earned her card for the 2024 Ladies European Tour at Q-School, where she tied for 5th.

In her rookie season, her best finish was a tie for 10th at the Dormy Open Helsingborg and the finished 66th in the season rankings. In 2025, she finished 3rd at the $5m PIF Saudi Ladies International.

== Amateur wins ==
- 2016 Sir Henry Cooper Junior Masters
- 2017 English Under 16 Girls' Championship, Telegraph Vitality Junior Golf Championship
- 2019 Major Champions Invitational
- 2020 English Women's Open Amateur Stroke Play Championship
- 2021 Florida Gators Invitational
- 2022 Hungarian Amateur Open Championship

== Results in LPGA majors ==
Tournament	2021	2022	2023	2024	2025	2026
Chevron Championship						
U.S. Women's Open		CUT				
Women's PGA Championship						
Evian Championship						
Women's British Open	T61			CUT		T58

Did not play

CUT = missed the half-way cut
T = tied

== Team appearances ==
Amateur

- Girls Home Internationals (representing England): 2016
- Patsy Hankins Trophy (representing Europe): 2018
- Curtis Cup (representing Great Britain & Ireland): 2018, 2021, 2022
- European Ladies' Team Championship (representing England): 2018, 2019, 2021 (winners), 2022 (winners)
- Junior Ryder Cup (representing Europe): 2018
- Espirito Santo Trophy (representing England): 2018
- Vagliano Trophy (representing Great Britain and Ireland): 2019
- Junior Solheim Cup (representing Europe): 2019
- Women's Home Internationals (representing England): 2021 (winners)
