= Mirabel Ting =

Malaysian professional golfer (born 2005)

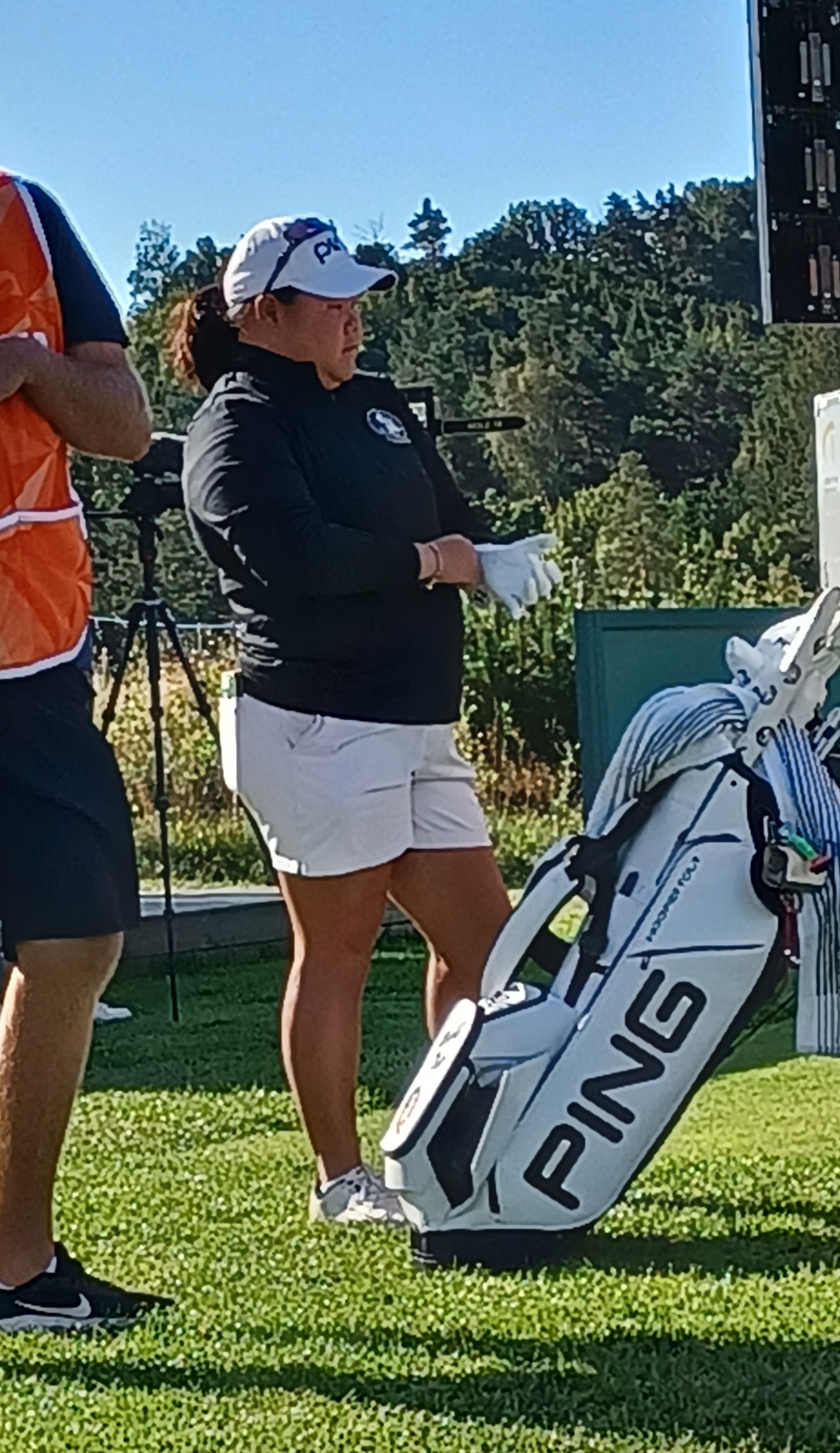
- Ting at the 2025 Hills Ladies Open

Personal information
- Nationality: Malaysia
- Born: 24 September 2005 (age 21) Miri, Malaysia
- Height: 5 ft 0 in (152 cm)

Career
- Sport: Golf
- College: Augusta University; Florida State University
- Turned professional: 2025
- Current tour: LPGA Tour
- Former tour: Epson Tour
- Professional wins: 3

Number of wins by tour
- Epson Tour: 2
- Other: 1

Best results in LPGA major championships
- Chevron Championship: DNP
- Women's PGA C'ship: DNP
- U.S. Women's Open: DNP
- Women's British Open: DNP
- Evian Championship: CUT: 2025

Achievements and awards
- Annika Award Winner: 2025
- Golfweek National Golfer of the Year: 2025
- PING Women's Golf Coaches Association Player of the Year: 2025
- Epson Tour Player of the Year: 2026
- Epson Tour Rookie of the Year: 2026

Mirabel Ting (born 24 September 2005) is a Malaysian professional golfer.

== Amateur career ==
At Augusta University in 2023, she earned Second Team All-America honors. She later moved to Florida State University and, in her sophomore year, was invited to the 2024 Augusta National Women's Amateur, where she finished tied 8th.

She made her LPGA Tour debut as an amateur at the 2024 Maybank Championship on home soil, where she finished tied 12th.

Ting received the 2025 Annika Award, as the top female U.S. collegiate golfer.

Ting was also awarded the 2025 Ping Player of the Year by the Women's Golf Coaches Association, the ACC Golfer of the Year and the Golden Nole for Women's Golf from FSU Athletics.

Her best position on the World Amateur Golf Ranking was second, reached 1 April 2025 and she kept that position until she turned professional three months later.

== Professional career ==
Ting was invited to the 2025 Evian Championship, where she made her tournament debut as a professional and missed the cut.

During the 2026 season, Ting played on the U.S.-based Epson Tour. In July 2026, she finished second at the Hartford HealthCare Women's Championship in Avon, Connecticut, advancing to seventh on the Race for the Card. At the next tournament, played two weeks later, the Smoky Mountain Championship in Pendleton, Oregon, Ting won after a playoff against Rachel Kuehn. It was Ting's first victory as a professional and she advanced to third in the tour rankings. Three weeks later, Ting won again, to take the lead on the Epson Tour. She finished the season at the top of the rankings, after finishing second in the Epson Tour Championship, winning the Epson Tour Player of the Year and Epson Tour Rookie of the Year and earning an LPGA Tour card for 2027. She advanced to a career best 201st in the Women's World Golf Rankings.

== Amateur wins ==
- 2017 Sarawak Amateur
- 2018 Sabah Amateur Open, Perak Amateur Open, Sarawak Chief Minister Cup, AmBank SportExcel International Junior Championship
- 2019 Queensland Stroke Play Championship
- 2021 SportExcel-Milo-NSC Malaysian Junior Premier Elite Golf Circuit - 3rd Leg, SportExcel-Milo-NSC Malaysian Junior Premier Elite Golf Circuit (Grand Finals)
- 2022 SportExcel-NSC-Milo Malaysian Junior Premier Elite Golf Circuit - 1st Leg, Singapore Open Amateur Championship, Penang Amateur Open, Negeri Sembilan Amateur Open
- 2023 Moon Golf Invitational, TSM Golf Challenge, Vietnam Ladies Amateur Open, RSGC Ladies Amateur Open
- 2024 Women's Orlando International Amateur Championship, Valspar Augusta Invitational, Sukan Malaysia XIX - Sukma, Folds of Honor Collegiate, Schooner Fall Classic
- 2025 Collegiate Invitational at Guadalajara Country Club, Briars Creek Invitational, Florida State Match Up, TSM Golf Challenge

== Professional wins (3) ==
=== Epson Tour wins (2) ===
No.	Date	Tournament	Winning score	To par	Margin of victory	Runner-up
1	8 Aug 2026	Smoky Mountain Championship	68-66-67=201	−15	Playoff	(United States) Rachel Kuehn
2	30 Aug 2026	Dream First Bank Charity Classic	66-70-66=202	−14	3 strokes	(United States) Dorsey Addicks

Epson Tour playoff record (1–0)

No.	Year	Tournament	Opponent	Result	Ref
1	2026	Smoky Mountain Championship	(United States) Rachel Kuehn	Won with birdie on first extra hole	

=== Other wins (1) ===
- 2022 PGM Ladies Championship (as an amateur)

== Team appearances ==
Amateur

- Patsy Hankins Trophy (representing Asia/Pacific): 2025 (winners)
- Arnold Palmer Cup (representing International team): 2023, 2024, 2025 (winners)
