= Amundi German Masters =

Golf tournament

Coordinates: 52.28°N 13.026°E

Tournament information
- Location: Hamburg, Germany
- Established: 2022
- Courses: Green Eagle Golf Courses (North Course)
- Par: 73
- Length: 6,245 yd (5,710 m)
- Tour: Ladies European Tour
- Format: Stroke play
- Prize fund: €350,000
- Month played: May

Tournament record score
- Aggregate: 273 Maja Stark
- To par: −15 as above

Current champion
- (Germany) Leonie Harm

Final champion
- Location in Europe Location in Germany

The Amundi German Masters is a professional golf tournament on the Ladies European Tour, held in Germany since 2022.

== History ==
The tournament was played at Golf & Country Club Seddiner See near Berlin for three years, before moving to Green Eagle Golf Courses near Hamburg in 2025.

In 2026, the tournament moved to May to become the opening tournament of the tour's European Swing.

German players have been competitive at the event, including in 2023 when Sophie Hausmann finished tied third. Alexandra Försterling became the first native winner in 2024. In 2026, ten German players made the cut and four, Alexandra Försterling, Chiara Noja, Esther Henseleit, and Laura Fünfstück, finished top-10 in addition to winner Leonie Harm.

== Winners ==
| Year | Winner | Score | To par | Margin of victory | Runner(s)-up | Purse (€) | Winner's share (€) | Venue |
|---|---|---|---|---|---|---|---|---|
| 2026 | (Germany) Leonie Harm | 65-75-73-69=282 | −10 | 1 stroke | (South Africa) Casandra Alexander | 350,000 | 52,500 | Green Eagle |
| 2025 | (Singapore) Shannon Tan | 70-69-68-76=283 | −9 | 1 stroke | (Germany) Helen Briem | 300,000 | 45,000 | Green Eagle |
| 2024 | (Germany) Alexandra Försterling | 70-70-69-67=276 | −12 | Playoff | (Austria) Emma Spitz | 300,000 | 45,000 | Seddiner See |
| 2023 | (Czech Republic) Kristýna Napoleaová | 68-66-69-71=274 | −14 | Playoff | (England) Cara Gainer | 300,000 | 45,000 | Seddiner See |
| 2022 | (Sweden) Maja Stark | 68-68-67-70=273 | −15 | 1 stroke | (Germany) Leonie Harm (Sweden) Jessica Karlsson | 300,000 | 45,000 | Seddiner See |
