= Leonie Harm =

German professional golfer (born 1997)

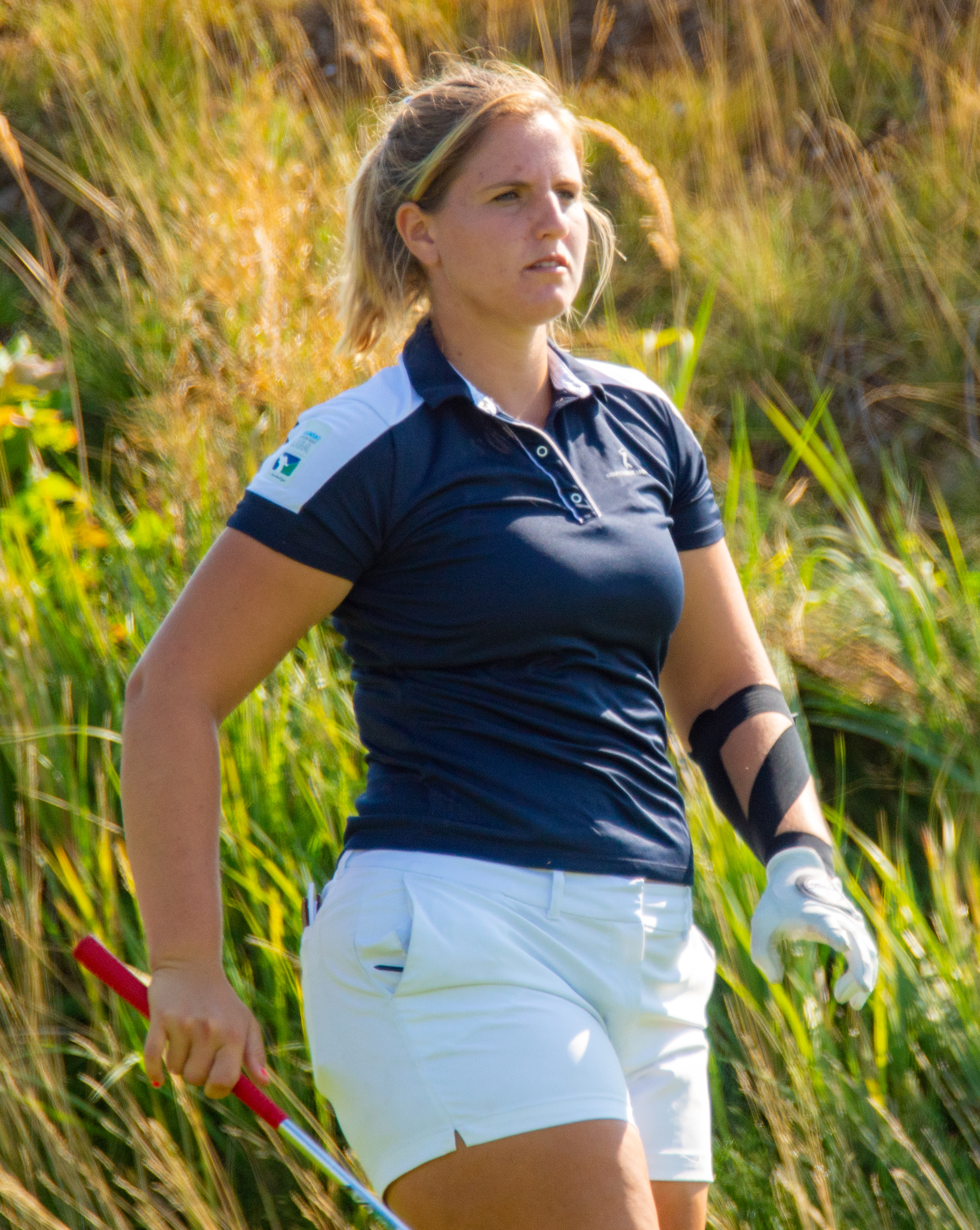
- Harm in August 2018

Personal information
- Nationality: Germany
- Born: 1 October 1997 (age 29) Stuttgart, Germany
- Height: 5 ft 11 in (1.80 m)

Career
- Sport: Golf
- College: University of Houston
- Turned professional: 2020
- Current tour: Ladies European Tour (joined 2020)
- Professional wins: 1

Number of wins by tour
- Ladies European Tour: 1

Best results in LPGA major championships
- Chevron Championship: DNP
- Women's PGA C'ship: DNP
- U.S. Women's Open: T49: 2021
- Women's British Open: T7: 2021
- Evian Championship: CUT: 2021, 2026

Achievements and awards
- American Athletic Conference Player of the Year: 2018, 2019

Leonie Harm (born 1 October 1997) is a German professional golfer and Ladies European Tour player. She was runner-up at the 2021 Investec South African Women's Open, the 2022 Amundi German Masters and the 2025 Hills Ladies Open before winning the 2026 Amundi German Masters. In 2018, Harm won the 115th British Ladies Amateur, the first German to capture the title.

== Early life and education ==
Harm was born in Stuttgart, Germany and attended a biochemical program at the University of Houston for her post-secondary education. At Houston, she played for the Houston Cougars golf team from 2015 to 2019, where she was American Athletic Conference Player of the Year her final two seasons.

== Amateur career ==
As an amateur golfer, Harm competed at the British Ladies Amateur Golf Championship and European Ladies Amateur Championship in 2017. The following year, Harm was the first golfer from Germany to win the British Ladies Amateur Golf Championship. With her 2018 British Amateur win, she won exemptions to the 2018 Women's British Open, 2018 Evian Championship and the 2019 U.S. Women's Open majors held by the LPGA Tour. In amateur events, Harm also received an exemption to the 2019 Augusta National Women's Amateur with her British Amateur win.

During the 2018 LPGA Tour major events, Harm missed the cut in the British Open and did not play in the Evian Championship. The following year, Harm was cut during the 2019 Augusta Amateur and the 2019 U.S. Women's Open. In team events, Harm competed at the 2016, 2017 and 2018 European Ladies' Team Championship. Apart from European team events, Harm was also a participant at the 2015 Junior Solheim Cup and the 2018 Espirito Santo Trophy.

== Professional career ==
Harm turned professional in early 2020 and joined the Ladies European Tour. In her rookie season, she was runner-up at the Investec South African Women's Open, finished 3rd at the Tipsport Czech Ladies Open, and tied for 7th in the 2021 Women's British Open at Carnoustie, only 3 strokes behind winner Anna Nordqvist.

In 2022, she was runner-up at the Amundi German Masters, a stroke behind Maja Stark, and tied for 3rd at the Jabra Ladies Open. She finished 20th on the LET Order of Merit in 2021 and 16th in 2022.

In 2025, she shared the lead heading into the final round of the Hills Ladies Open and ultimately finished runner-up, two strokes behind Meja Örtengren.

== Awards and honours ==
Harm was named an Honorable Mention All-American by the Women's Golf Coaches Association in 2018 and 2019.

== Personal life ==
In 2013, Harm was in a coma and sustained multiple injuries after being hit by a drunk driver.

== Amateur wins ==
- 2014 German National Amateur
- 2015 German International Amateur, German Girls Open, German National Amateur
- 2017 Texas State Invitational
- 2018 German International Amateur, British Ladies Amateur
- 2019 Allstate Sugar Bowl Intercollegiate, Clover Cup, The American Championship

== Professional wins (1) ==
=== Ladies European Tour wins (1) ===
| No. | Date | Tournament | Winning score | To par | Margin of victory | Runner-up |
|---|---|---|---|---|---|---|
| 1 | 17 May 2026 | Amundi German Masters | 65-75-73-69=282 | −10 | 1 stroke | (South Africa) Casandra Alexander |

== Results in LPGA majors ==
| Tournament | 2018 | 2019 | 2020 | 2021 | 2022 | 2023 | 2024 | 2025 | 2026 |
|---|---|---|---|---|---|---|---|---|---|
| Chevron Championship | | | | | | | | | |
| Women's PGA Championship | | | | | | | | | |
| U.S. Women's Open | | CUT | | T49 | | | | | |
| The Evian Championship | | | NT | CUT | | | | | CUT |
| Women's British Open | CUT | | | T7 | T41 | | | | CUT |

Top 10
Did not play

CUT = missed the half-way cut
NT = no tournament
T = tied

== Team appearances ==
- Junior Solheim Cup (representing Europe): 2015
- European Ladies' Team Championship (representing Germany): 2016, 2017, 2018, 2019
- Espirito Santo Trophy (representing Germany): 2018
- Arnold Palmer Cup (representing the International team): 2019 (winners)
- Vagliano Trophy (representing the Continent of Europe): 2019 (winners)
