= 2021 Curtis Cup =

Golf competition in Conwy, Wales

41st Curtis Cup Match
- Dates: 26–28 August 2021
- Venue: Conwy Golf Club
- Location: Conwy, Wales
- Captains: Elaine Ratcliffe (GB&I); Sarah LeBrun Ingram (USA)
(United Kingdom) (Republic of Ireland)	7 1/2	12 1/2	(United States)
- United States wins the Curtis Cup

Location map
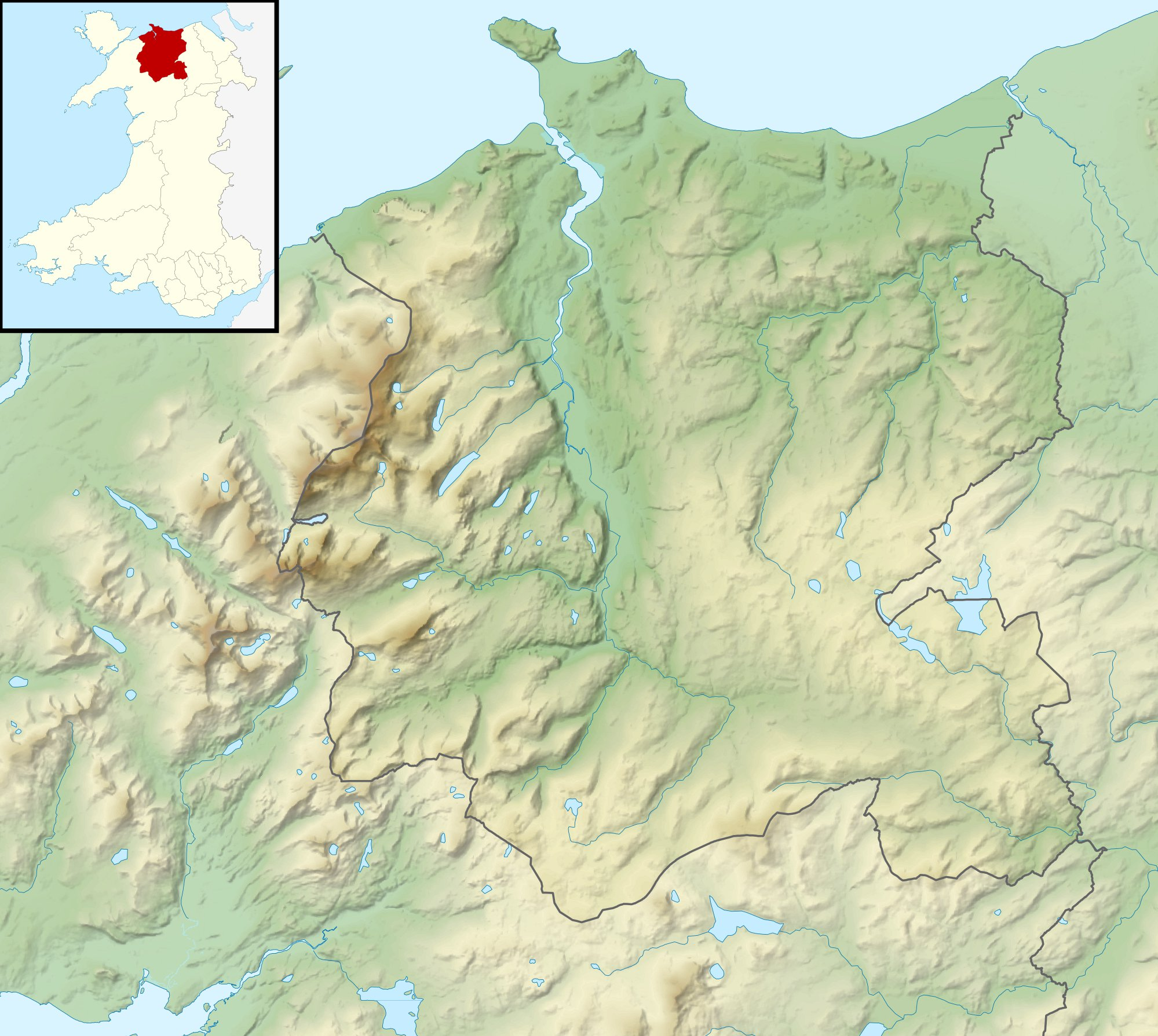
- Location in the United Kingdom Location in Wales Location in Conwy County

The 41st Curtis Cup Match was played from 26 to 28 August 2021 at Conwy Golf Club near Conwy, Wales. It was originally scheduled for 12–14 June 2020 but was postponed to 2021 in response to the COVID-19 pandemic.

Great Britain & Ireland had the better of the first day and led to by 4 1/2 points to 1 1/2 points at the end of the day. The USA team levelled the match at 6 points a piece by the end of the second day. The third day singles matches were initially very tight but ultimately, most of the matches swung toward the USA team and they secured 6 1/2 points of the 8 available. The USA team retained the Curtis Cup with a total score of 12 1/2 to 7 1/2 for the GB&I team. It was the USA's first away win in the contest since 2008.

== Format ==
The contest was a three-day competition, with three foursomes and three fourball matches on each of the first two days, and eight singles matches on the final day, a total of 20 points.

Each of the 20 matches was worth one point in the larger team competition. If a match ended all square after the 18th hole extra holes were not played. Rather, each side earned 1/2 point toward their team total. The team that accumulated at least 10 1/2 points won the competition. In the event of a tie, the current holder would have retained the Cup.

== Teams ==
Eight players for Great Britain & Ireland and USA participated in the event plus one non-playing captain for each team.

The Great Britain & Ireland team was announced on 9 August 2021.

& Great Britain & Ireland
Name	Age	Rank	Notes
(England) Elaine Ratcliffe	48	–	non-playing captain
(Scotland) Hannah Darling	18	25	2021 Girls Amateur champion
(Scotland) Louise Duncan	21	31	2021 Women's Amateur champion; tied 10th in 2021 Women's Open
(England) Annabell Fuller	19	27	played in 2018; 2020 English Women's Open Amateur Stroke Play champion
(England) Charlotte Heath	19	49	2020 Australian Women's Amateur champion
(England) Caley McGinty	20	53
(England) Emily Toy	23	87	2019 Women's Amateur champion
(Republic of Ireland) Lauren Walsh	20	14
(Northern Ireland) Annabel Wilson	20	67

Rose Zhang, Rachel Heck and Allisen Corpuz were the first players to make the American team, as the three highest-ranked Americans in the World Amateur Golf Ranking (WAGR) on 21 July 2021. Automatic selection was also given to Jensen Castle, the winner of the 2021 U.S. Women's Amateur, which finished on 8 August. The winner of the 2021 Mark H. McCormack Medal, which was awarded to the number one ranked player in the WAGR after that event, was also guaranteed a place, provided they were American. This was won by Zhang who was already guaranteed a place. The remainder of the team was announced on 9 August.

USA
Name	Age	Rank	Notes
Sarah LeBrun Ingram	c. 55	–	non-playing captain
Jensen Castle	20	146	2021 U.S. Women's Amateur champion
Allisen Corpuz	23	9
Rachel Heck	19	2
Gina Kim	21	17	2021 North and South Women's Amateur champion
Rachel Kuehn	20	23	2020 North and South Women's Amateur champion
Brooke Matthews	22	35
Emilia Migliaccio	22	15	2019 Pan American Games gold medal
Rose Zhang	18	1	2020 U.S. Women's Amateur champion, 2021 U.S. Girls' Junior champion

Note: "Rank" is the World Amateur Golf Ranking as of the start of the Cup.

== Thursday's matches ==
=== Morning foursomes ===
&	Results
Duncan/Darling	halved	Heck/Zhang
Fuller/Heath	(United Kingdom) (Republic of Ireland) 4 & 3	Kuehn/Migliaccio
McGinty/Toy	(United Kingdom) (Republic of Ireland) 3 & 1	Kim/Matthews
2 1/2	Session	1/2
2 1/2	Overall	1/2

=== Afternoon fourballs ===
&	Results
Darling/Fuller	(United Kingdom) (Republic of Ireland) 1 up	Heck/Migliaccio
Walsh/McGinty	(United Kingdom) (Republic of Ireland) 2 & 1	Castle/Kim
Wilson/Toy	(United States) 1 up	Zhang/Corpuz
2	Session	1
4 1/2	Overall	1 1/2

== Friday's matches ==
=== Morning foursomes ===
&	Results
Duncan/Darling	(United States) 3 & 2	Heck/Zhang
Heath/Fuller	(United States) 3 & 2	Kuehn/Migliaccio
McGinty/Toy	halved	Castle/Matthews
1/2	Session	2 1/2
5	Overall	4

=== Afternoon fourballs ===
&	Results
Walsh/Duncan	(United States) 3 & 2	Castle/Kuehn
Darling/Fuller	(United Kingdom) (Republic of Ireland) 4 & 3	Heck/Kim
McGinty/Toy	(United States) 3 & 2	Corpuz/Zhang
1	Session	2
6	Overall	6

== Saturday's singles matches ==
&	Results
Hannah Darling	halved	Jensen Castle
Lauren Walsh	(United States) 3 & 1	Rachel Heck
Charlotte Heath	(United States) 3 & 2	Brooke Matthews
Louise Duncan	(United States) 2 up	Rachel Kuehn
Annabel Wilson	(United States) 2 & 1	Allisen Corpuz
Caley McGinty	(United Kingdom) (Republic of Ireland) 4 & 3	Gina Kim
Annabell Fuller	(United States) 2 up	Emilia Migliaccio
Emily Toy	(United States) 1 up	Rose Zhang
1 1/2	Session	6 1/2
7 1/2	Overall	12 1/2
