= Jensen Castle =

American professional golfer (born 2001)

Personal information
- Nationality: United States
- Born: February 21, 2001 (age 25) West Columbia, South Carolina, U.S.
- Height: 5 ft 7 in (1.70 m)

Career
- Sport: Golf
- College: University of Kentucky
- Turned professional: 2024
- Current tour: Women's All Pro Tour (joined 2025)

Best results in LPGA major championships
- Chevron Championship: DNP
- Women's PGA C'ship: DNP
- U.S. Women's Open: CUT: 2021, 2022
- Women's British Open: DNP
- Evian Championship: CUT: 2022

Achievements and awards
- Kentucky Golf Association Women's Player of the Year: 2021

Jensen Castle (born February 21, 2001) is an American professional golfer. She won the 2021 U.S. Women's Amateur.

== Early life and amateur career ==
Castle grew up in West Columbia, South Carolina. She was one of the top amateur golfers in the country during her high school years, and was ranked 4th by the AJGA in the class of 2019. She won the South Carolina Class State Championship in 2016 and again in 2018, where shot a two-day state tournament record 137 and won by 10 strokes.

In 2019, Castle lost a playoff to Ingrid Lindblad at the 2019 Annika Invitational USA, and finished second at PGA of America's Girl's Junior PGA Championship in Hartford, Connecticut, two strokes behind Yuka Saso. She was a member of the East squad that won the 2019 Wyndham Cup.

In 2021, Castle won the U.S. Women's Amateur at Westchester Country Club in New York, becoming the first number 63 seed to lift the Robert Cox Trophy. Plagued by a rib injury, she started despite doctors' recommendations, and opened the week with a seven-over-par 79 in the first round of stroke play. She then prevailed in a 12-for-2 playoff to reach match play, and came back from deficits in three of six matches to defeat reigning NCAA individual champion Rachel Heck in the semi-finals, and eventually claim the trophy over former world number one Yu-Chiang Hou, winning 2 and 1 in the 36-hole championship match. She earned a start at the 2021 Cognizant Founders Cup on the LPGA Tour where she did not make the cut.

Castle appeared at the Augusta National Women's Amateur three times, and advanced to the final round at Augusta National Golf Club twice, finishing T-12 in 2022 and T-26 in 2023.

She won the Curtis Cup with the U.S. national team twice, in 2021 and 2022.

== College career ==
Castle enrolled at the University of Kentucky in 2019 and played with the Kentucky Wildcats women's golf team 2019–2024, where she was named to the All-SEC First Team and All-American.

== Professional career ==
Castle turned professional in 2024. She made her professional debut at the FireKeepers Casino Hotel Championship on the Epson Tour.

In 2025, she joined the Women's All Pro Tour.

== Amateur wins ==
- 2016 South Carolina Class State Championship
- 2018 South Carolina Class State Championship, Carolinas Junior Girls PGA Championship
- 2020 Carolinas Women's Four-Ball Championship (with Rachel Kuehn)
- 2021 Carolinas Women's Four-Ball Championship (with Rachel Kuehn)
- 2021 U.S. Women's Amateur
- 2022 Ruth's Chris Tar Heel Invite

== Results in LPGA majors ==
Tournament	2021	2022
ANA Inspiration		
U.S. Women's Open	CUT	CUT
Women's PGA Championship		
The Evian Championship		CUT
Women's British Open		

Did not play

CUT = missed the half-way cut

== U.S. national team appearances ==
Amateur

- Curtis Cup: 2021 (winners), 2022 (winners)
