= Executive Women's Golf Association =

Executive Woman's Golf Association
- Legal status: Nonprofit
- Purpose: Promoting Women Playing Golf
- Headquarters: Palm Beach, Florida
- Region served: United States, Canada, Ireland, Italy, South Africa and Bermuda
- Website: www.ewga.com

The Executive Women's Golf Association (EWGA) was an organization that supports women in learning and playing the game of golf.

== History ==
The EWGA was founded by Nancy Oliver in 1991 and was one of the largest women's amateur golf associations in the United States. In 2018, the EWGA was acquired by the LPGA and rebranded as LPGA Women Who Play, and later rebranded as LPGA Amateur Golf Association.

== Organizational structure and location ==
The organization was an international membership association and was volunteer-run, from its national board to its local chapters. As of 2014 the EWGA had 120 chapters; 114 throughout the United States, and 1 chapter each in Canada, Bermuda, South Africa, Ireland and Italy. The national board of directors, composed of chapter leaders and representatives from the LPGA, United States Golf Association, PGA of America, and industry-specific specialists, governed the Association. The EWGA headquarters was in Palm Beach Gardens, Florida, and was a Florida not-for-profit 501(c)(6) organization. Each EWGA chapter was an incorporated business entity affiliated with the Association.

== Chapter activities ==
Typically chapters hosted two to three major tournaments per year, sponsor weekly "after work" 9-hole league play, business networking and social functions, weekend golf outings, golf rules and etiquette seminars, education programs, and charity fundraising events. Each chapter hosted a chapter championship which acted as a qualifying event in the EWGA Championship. Winners of the chapter championships proceeded to the regional golf tournament and winners from regionals went on to compete in the National Championship.

== National championship ==
The EGWA has held 19 national tournaments annually since 1995. The format is stroke play. EWGA Championship Finals consist of five individual flights, or divisions of golfers: Championship Flight, First Flight, Second Flight, Third Flight and Fourth Flight. Awards are given to winners for both gross score and net score.

The 2014 EWGA Championship finals were at Tennessee's Hermitage Golf Course where, on October 10–11, 222 women representing 80 chapters, 35 states and 2 Canadian chapters competed in two rounds of stroke play. In addition to individual play, there were also scramble teams including the Team Detroit Divot Divas.

Another event, the EWGA Cup Match Series, has been played since 2012. Members competed as teams in match play at the regional level and winning teams advanced to the national tournament. The Cup Match consists of two days of competition with a different format of match play each day. The two formats are: fourball match play and singles match play. The 2014 series was hosted at Troon North Golf Club.

== See also ==
- LPGA
