= Lauren Walsh (golfer) =

Irish professional golfer (born 2000)

Personal information
- Nationality: Ireland
- Born: September 11, 2000 (age 26) Dublin, Ireland
- Height: 176 cm (5 ft 9 in)

Career
- Sport: Golf
- College: Wake Forest University
- Turned professional: 2023
- Current tours: LPGA Tour (joined 2026); Ladies European Tour (joined 2024)
- Former tour: LET Access Series (joined 2023)

Best results in LPGA major championships
- Chevron Championship: DNP
- Women's PGA C'ship: CUT: 2026
- U.S. Women's Open: DNP
- Women's British Open: T42: 2021
- Evian Championship: CUT: 2026

Achievements and awards
- Wake Forest University Scholar Athlete of the Year: 2023

Lauren Walsh (born 11 September 2000) is an Irish professional golfer who plays on the LPGA Tour and Ladies European Tour. She won the 2023 NCAA Division I women's golf championship with Wake Forest.

== Early life and amateur career ==
Walsh was born in Dublin and grew up in Kill, County Kildare. She started playing golf at age 10 together with her older sister at their local club Castlewarden. At 16, she joined Irish Girls National team and represented Ireland at the 2018 Summer Youth Olympics in Buenos Aires and the World Junior Girls Championship in Canada.

Walsh attended Wake Forest University 2019–2023 and played with the Wake Forest Demon Deacons women's golf team. As a senior, she was First Team All-American, named to the All-ACC Team, and Wake Forest Scholar Athlete of the Year. She was the best performer on the winning 2023 NCAA Division I women's golf championship team, where she was undefeated in match play and finished tied seventh in stroke play, four strokes behind winner Rose Zhang.

In 2019, she was semi-finalist at the Irish Women's Amateur Close Championship and tied for 8th at the ISPS Handa World Invitational, a professional event. By virtue of being the highest ranked women in the World Amateur Golf Ranking from Great Britain and Ireland, she was one of six amateurs in the 2021 Women's British Open at Carnoustie Golf Links, where she made the cut. After the Atlantic Coast Conference canceled the 2020 college golf season because of the COVID-19 pandemic, Walsh signed up for the Women's Griffin Amateur and the Sunshine State Amateur, and won both back-to-back.

Walsh represented Great Britain & Ireland in the 2021 and 2022 Curtis Cup.

== Professional career ==
Walsh graduated from university in May 2023 and turned professional in July. She competed in five LET Access Series events and recorded four top-10 finishes, including a runner-up finish in the Trust Golf Links Series event at Ramside Hall.

She joined the 2024 Ladies European Tour (LET) after earning category 16 status at LET Q-School in December 2023. After a good start, she was able to improve to category 10 at the first reshuffle.

In her rookie LET season, Walsh tied for third at the VP Bank Swiss Ladies Open and Aramco Team Series - London, to finish 18th in the Order of Merit and 4th in the Rookie of the Year rankings.

In 2025, Walsh was ranked 10th in the LET, and in December 2025, she secured her card for the 2026 LPGA Tour at Q-Series.

In May 2026, Walsh was third at the ShopRite LPGA Classic.

== Amateur wins ==
- 2017 East Leinster Girls Championship, Connacht Girls Open Championship
- 2018 Connacht Women & Girls Senior Championship
- 2020 Women's Griffin Amateur, Sunshine State Amateur

== Results in LPGA majors ==
Tournament	2021	2022	2023	2024	2025	2026
Chevron Championship						
U.S. Women's Open						
Women's PGA Championship						CUT
The Evian Championship						CUT
Women's British Open	T42			CUT	CUT	CUT

Did not play

CUT = missed the half-way cut
"T" = tied

== Team appearances ==
Amateur

- Girls Home Internationals (representing Ireland): 2017
- European Girls' Team Championship (representing Ireland): 2017
- World Junior Girls Championship (representing Ireland): 2017, 2018
- Summer Youth Olympics (representing Ireland): 2018
- Women's Home Internationals (representing Ireland): 2018, 2019, 2021
- European Ladies' Team Championship (representing Ireland): 2018, 2019, 2021, 2022
- Arnold Palmer Cup (representing the International team): 2021, 2023
- Curtis Cup (representing Great Britain & Ireland): 2021, 2022
- Espirito Santo Trophy (representing Ireland): 2022
- Women's and Men's Home Internationals (representing Ireland): 2022
