= Louise Duncan =

Scottish golfer

Personal information
- Full name: Louise Margaret Duncan
- Nationality: Scotland
- Born: February 2000 (age 26) West Kilbride, North Ayrshire, Scotland

Career
- Sport: Golf
- College: University of Edinburgh; University of Stirling
- Turned professional: 2022

Best results in LPGA major championships
- Chevron Championship: DNP
- Women's PGA C'ship: DNP
- U.S. Women's Open: CUT: 2022
- Women's British Open: T10: 2021
- Evian Championship: DNP

Louise Margaret Duncan (born February 2000) is a Scottish professional golfer. She won The Women's Amateur Championship in 2021 and finished tied for 10th at the 2021 Women's British Open.

== Amateur career ==
Duncan started playing golf at 10. She is a product of West Kilbride Golf Club on Scotland's west coast, where she has been coached by club professional Iain Darroch. An R&A Scholar and University of Stirling student, Duncan has benefited from coaching by former European Tour winner Dean Robertson, who also served as her caddie during the 2021 Women's British Open.

In 2018, she won the Fairhaven Trophy and was runner-up at the Scottish Girls' Amateur Championship. In 2019, she was 3rd at the Scottish Women's Amateur Championship held at Kilmarnock (Barassie) Golf Club. In 2021, she triumphed at the Women's Amateur Championship, the first Scot to win the Women's Amateur since Alison Rose in 1997. Her win was also notable as she recorded the largest winning margin in the championship's history, beating Jóhanna Lea Lúđvíksdóttir, 9 and 8.

Duncan has represented Scotland at the Girls Home Internationals, Women's Home Internationals, European Girls' Team Championship and the European Ladies' Team Championship. She was part of Great Britain and Ireland's 2021 Curtis Cup team at Conwy Golf Club and in 2022 at Merion.

Duncan's Women's Amateur win qualified her for the 2021 Women's British Open at Carnoustie Golf Links, where she was the breakout star of the week. After rounds of 68, 73 and 68 she was tied for fourth place, only two strokes behind joint leaders Nanna Koerstz Madsen and Anna Nordqvist. She had a final round 72, to finish in a tie for 10th place. She joined winner Anna Nordqvist at the trophy presentation to accept the Smyth Salver for low amateur.

== Professional career ==
Duncan turned professional in July 2022.

== Amateur wins ==
- 2018 Fairhaven Trophy
- 2020 R&A Student Tour Series - Portugal
- 2021 The Women's Amateur Championship

== Results in LPGA majors ==
Tournament	2021	2022
Chevron Championship		
U.S. Women's Open		CUT
Women's PGA Championship		
The Evian Championship		
Women's British Open	T10LA	T19

Top 10
Did not play

LA = Low amateur
"T" = tied

== Team appearances ==
Amateur

- Girls Home Internationals (representing Scotland): 2017, 2018
- European Girls' Team Championship (representing Scotland): 2017, 2018
- World Junior Girls Championship (representing Scotland): 2018
- Women's Home Internationals (representing Scotland): 2019, 2021
- European Ladies' Team Championship (representing Scotland): 2021, 2022
- Curtis Cup (representing Great Britain & Ireland): 2021, 2022
