= Papua New Guinea at the 2018 Summer Youth Olympics =

- IOC code: PNG
- NOC: Papua New Guinea Olympic Committee

in Buenos Aires, Argentina 6 – 18 October 2018
- Competitors: 3 in 2 sports
- Medals: Gold 0 Silver 0 Bronze 0 Total 0

Summer Youth Olympics appearances
- 2010; 2014; 2018

Papua New Guinea is scheduled to participate at the 2018 Summer Youth Olympics in Buenos Aires, Argentina from 6 October to 18 October 2018.

== Golf ==
Papua New Guinea received a quota of two athletes to compete by the tripartite committee.

Individual

Athlete	Event	Round 1		Round 2			Round 3			Total		
Athlete	Event	Score	Rank	Score	Total	Rank	Score	Total	Rank	Score	Par	Rank
Natalie Mok	Girls' Individual	81 (+11)	25	79 (+9)	160	26	92 (+22)	252	32	252	+42	31
Terrence Coleman	Boys' Individual	77 (+7)	23	84 (+14)	161	31	87 (+17)	248	29	248	+38	29

Team

Athletes	Event	Round 1 (Fourball)		Round 2 (Foursome)		Round 3 (Individual Stroke)				Total		
Athletes	Event	Score	Rank	Score	Rank	Girl	Boy	Total	Rank	Score	Par	Rank
Natalie Mok; Terrence Coleman	Mixed team	75 (+5)	32	88 (+18)	31	81	85	166 (+26)	32	329	+49	32
