= United Arab Emirates at the 2018 Summer Youth Olympics =

- IOC code: UAE
- NOC: United Arab Emirates National Olympic Committee
- Website: http://www.uaenoc.net/

in Buenos Aires, Argentina 6 – 18 October 2018
- Competitors: 7 in 5 sports
- Medals Ranked 79th: Gold 0 Silver 1 Bronze 0 Total 1

Summer Youth Olympics appearances
- 2010; 2014; 2018; 2026

The United Arab Emirates participated at the 2018 Summer Youth Olympics in Buenos Aires, Argentina from 6 October to 18 October 2018.

== Equestrian ==
The United Arab Emirates qualified a rider based on its ranking in the FEI World Jumping Challenge Rankings.

- Individual Jumping - 1 athlete

== Golf ==
The United Arab Emirates received a quota of two athletes to compete by the tripartite committee.

Individual

Athlete	Event	Round 1		Round 2			Round 3			Total		
Athlete	Event	Score	Rank	Score	Total	Rank	Score	Total	Rank	Score	Par	Rank
Reema Alheloo	Girls' Individual	88 (+18)	32	84 (+14)	172	32	88 (+18)	260	31	260	+50	32
Mohamed Alhajeri	Boys' Individual	84 (+14)	31	77 (+7)	161	23	88 (+18)	249	30	249	+39	30

Team

Athletes	Event	Round 1 (Fourball)		Round 2 (Foursome)		Round 3 (Individual Stroke)				Total		
Athletes	Event	Score	Rank	Score	Rank	Girl	Boy	Total	Rank	Score	Par	Rank
Reema Alheloo; Mohamed Alhajeri	Mixed team	72 (+2)	31	84 (+14)	30	84	77	161 (+21)	30	317	+37	31

== Shooting ==
The United Arab Emirates was given a quota by the tripartite committee to compete in shooting.

- Girls' 10m Air Rifle - 1 quota

Individual

Athlete	Event	Qualification		Final	
Athlete	Event	Points	Rank	Points	Rank
Latifa Almaazmi	Girls' 10m air rifle	606.4	19	did not advance	

Team

Athletes	Event	Qualification		Round of 16	Quarterfinals	Semifinals	Final / BM	
Athletes	Event	Points	Rank	Opposition Result	Opposition Result	Opposition Result	Opposition Result	Rank
Latifa Almaazmi (UAE); Shahu Tushar Mane (IND)	Mixed 10m air rifle	803.2	20	did not advance				

== Weightlifting ==
Boy

Athlete	Event	Snatch		Clean & Jerk		Total	Rank
Athlete	Event	Result	Rank	Result	Rank	Total	Rank
Shaikh Mohammed Al-Qasimi	−77 kg	85	9	106	8	191	8

Girl

Athlete	Event	Snatch		Clean & jerk		Total	Rank
Athlete	Event	Result	Rank	Result	Rank	Total	Rank
Mai Almadani	+63 kg	66	10	76	10	142	10
