= Elina Saksa =

Finnish professional golfer (born 2000)

Personal information
- Full name: Elina Josefina Saksa
- Nationality: Finland
- Born: 28 March 2000 (age 26) Turku, Finland
- Height: 5 ft 5 in (165 cm)

Career
- Sport: Golf
- College: University of Nevada, Las Vegas; California State University, Fullerton; Aalto University
- Turned professional: 2025
- Current tour: LET Access Series (joined 2025)

Elina Josefina Saksa (born 28 March 2000) is a Finnish professional golfer who competes on the LET Access Series (LETAS). She turned professional in 2025 and recorded four top-10 finishes during her debut season on LETAS.

== Early life and amateur career ==
Saksa was born in Turku, Finland. She began playing golf at the age of nine and focused exclusively on the sport from the age of 14, after previously competing in multiple sports,

As a junior golfer, Saksa achieved international success by winning the 2016 European Young Masters. In 2018, she represented Finland at the Summer Youth Olympic Games in Buenos Aires. She has also represented Finland in several international team competitions, including the European Ladies' Team Championship and the Espirito Santo Trophy.

At the national level, Saksa has won multiple Finnish titles, including the Finnish Ladies' National Stroke Play Championship in 2023.

== College career ==
Saksa played collegiate golf in the United States from 2019 to 2023. She began her collegiate career at the University of Nevada, Las Vegas, where she won the Las Vegas Collegiate Showdown during her first semester.

She later transferred to California State University, Fullerton. In 2021, she won the Jackrabbit Intercollegiate, marking her second collegiate victory. Saksa was named a Women's Golf Coaches Association (WGCA) All-American Scholar in each of her four collegiate seasons.

== Professional career ==
Saksa turned professional in 2025 and joined the LET Access Series. In her rookie season, she finished 29th in the Order of Merit and sixth in the Rookie of the Year standings. Her best result came in her professional debut at the Terre Blanche Ladies Open, where she finished tied for fourth.

For the 2026 season, Saksa holds full status on LETAS and conditional status on the Ladies European Tour.
