= Conwy Golf Club =

Golf course in North Wales

Conwy Caernarvonshire Golf Club
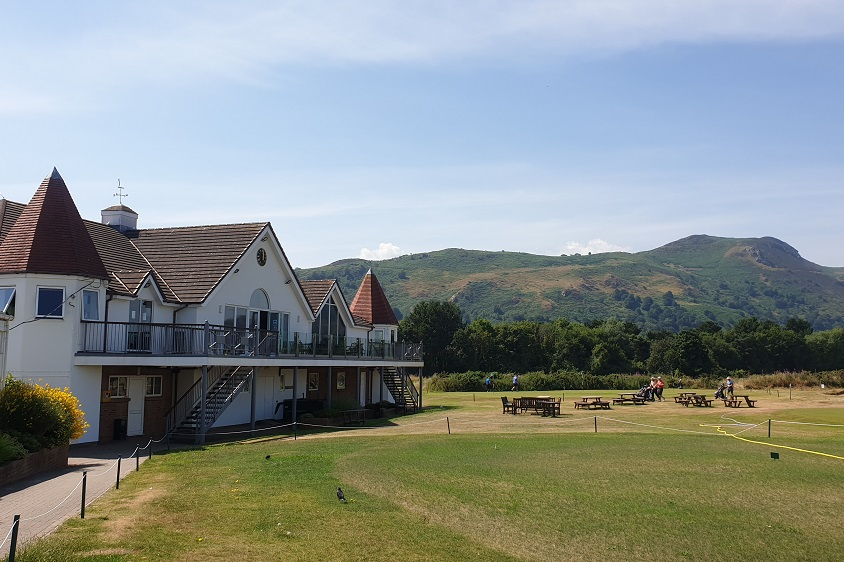
- Clubhouse and Conwy Mountain

- Location in Wales
- 53.2912°N 3.8435°W

Club information
- Location: Conwy, Wales
- Established: 1890
- Type: Private
- Total holes: 18
- Tournaments: Curtis Cup
- Website: https://www.conwygolfclub.com/
- Designed by: Jack Morris
- Par: 72
- Length: 6,910 yards (6,320 m)

Conwy Golf Club in Conwy, Wales was officially opened as Caernarfonshire Golf Club in 1890. The links course on the Morfa Conwy peninsula was designed by Jack Morris (nephew of Old Tom Morris). The championship course is 6,910 yards (6,320 m) long with a par of 72.

== History ==
In 1869, three Scots set out a nine-hole course at Conwy. Some historians think that it was the first golf course in Wales.

A new nine hole course was laid out in 1875, when members of the Royal Liverpool Golf Club commissioned its design by their club professional, Jack Morris. Caernarfonshire Golf Club was formally established at Conwy Guildhall on 30 June 1890. In 1895 the course was extended to 18 holes and the club was a founding member of the Welsh Golfing Union. In 1899 the Welsh Amateur Golf Championships were held at the course, followed by the Welsh Professional Championship in 1905. The present clubhouse was built and opened on 1 June 1996, replacing the one built in 1934, which had become dilapidated. The original clubhouse from 1890 was a donated military mess hut from a nearby army camp. That was replaced in the early 1920s but that was destroyed by a fire during the summer of 1933.

The course was commandeered for military use during World War I, which decimated the original links course. In World War II the ninth green was lost as a result of the building of a military harbour on the Conwy Estuary. During the 1970s, Frank Pennink remodelled the front nine holes. In 1983 Brian Hugget and Neil Coles redesigned five of the holes on the back nine to accommodate the building of the A55 (North Wales Expressway).

== Tournaments ==
The Martini International tournament was held at Conwy Golf Club in 1970, when the title was shared by Doug Sewell and Peter Thomson.

The 41st Curtis Cup tournament was played at Conwy Golf Club on 26–28 August 2021. The club was originally hosting the event on 12–14 June 2020 but it was postponed due to the COVID-19 pandemic.
