= Rachel Heck =

American golfer (born 2001)

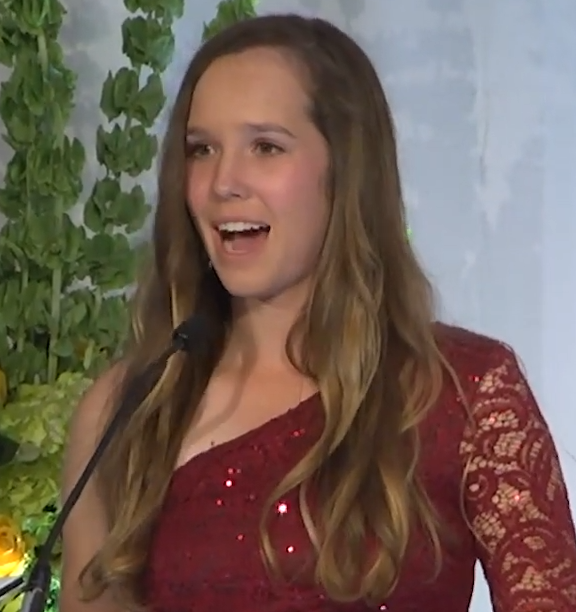
- Heck in 2017

Personal information
- Nationality: United States
- Born: October 22, 2001 (age 25) Memphis, Tennessee, U.S.
- Height: 5 ft 8 in (173 cm)

Career
- Sport: Golf
- College: Stanford University
- Status: Amateur

Best results in LPGA major championships
- Chevron Championship: CUT: 2019
- Women's PGA C'ship: DNP
- U.S. Women's Open: T33: 2017
- Women's British Open: DNP
- Evian Championship: T44: 2018

Achievements and awards
- Honda Sports Award: 2021
- Annika Award: 2021
- WGCA Player of the Year: 2021
- WGCA Freshman of the Year: 2021
- Pac-12 Golfer of the Year: 2021
- Pac-12 Newcomer of the Year: 2021

Rachel Heck (born October 22, 2001) is an American amateur golfer.

== Early life and amateur career ==
Heck, a native of Memphis, Tennessee started playing golf with her two sisters almost as soon as she could walk, competing in friendly competitions for ice cream. Her older sister, Abby, played collegiate golf at University of Notre Dame and younger sister, Anna, who is committed to play golf at the University of Notre Dame, competed in the 2021 U.S. Women's Amateur Four-Ball.

A golf prodigy, Heck was a five-time AJGA All-American. She was the youngest competitor in the 2017 U.S. Women's Open, tied for 33rd. She also made the cut at the 2018 Evian Championship, tied for 44th. She was a member of the 2018 U.S. Junior Ryder Cup team, sinking the putt that clinched the title for the U.S. She was named USA Today's High School Golfer of the Year in 2017 and 2018 while competing for Memphis's St. Agnes Academy.

Heck was a member of the 2019 U.S. Junior Solheim Cup team, going 2–1 over three rounds of match play. She also competed in the U.S. Women's Amateur and finished T8 in the Girl's Junior PGA Championship. She also earned one of four amateur spots at the 2019 ANA Inspiration. Along with later fellow Stanford Cardinal Sadie Englemann, she advanced to the semifinals of the 2019 U.S. Women's Amateur Four-Ball.

In 2020, Heck was the stroke-play medalist in the U.S. Women's Amateur, shooting 4-under-par across two rounds. She advanced to the round of 16 before falling, 1 down, to eventual champion Rose Zhang. She was also a quarterfinalist in the 2020 North and South Women's Amateur.

Heck enrolled at Stanford University in 2021 to play golf with the Stanford Cardinal women's golf team. In her freshman year, she recorded six individual collegiate wins. She became the third player in college history to sweep conference (Pac-12), regional (Stanford Regional) and national titles (NCAAs), joining USC's Annie Park and Arizona's Marisa Baena. Heck became the first Stanford woman to win an NCAA title, and the ninth freshman to achieve the feat. Her 69.72 scoring average over 25 rounds was, at the time, the lowest in NCAA women's golf history.

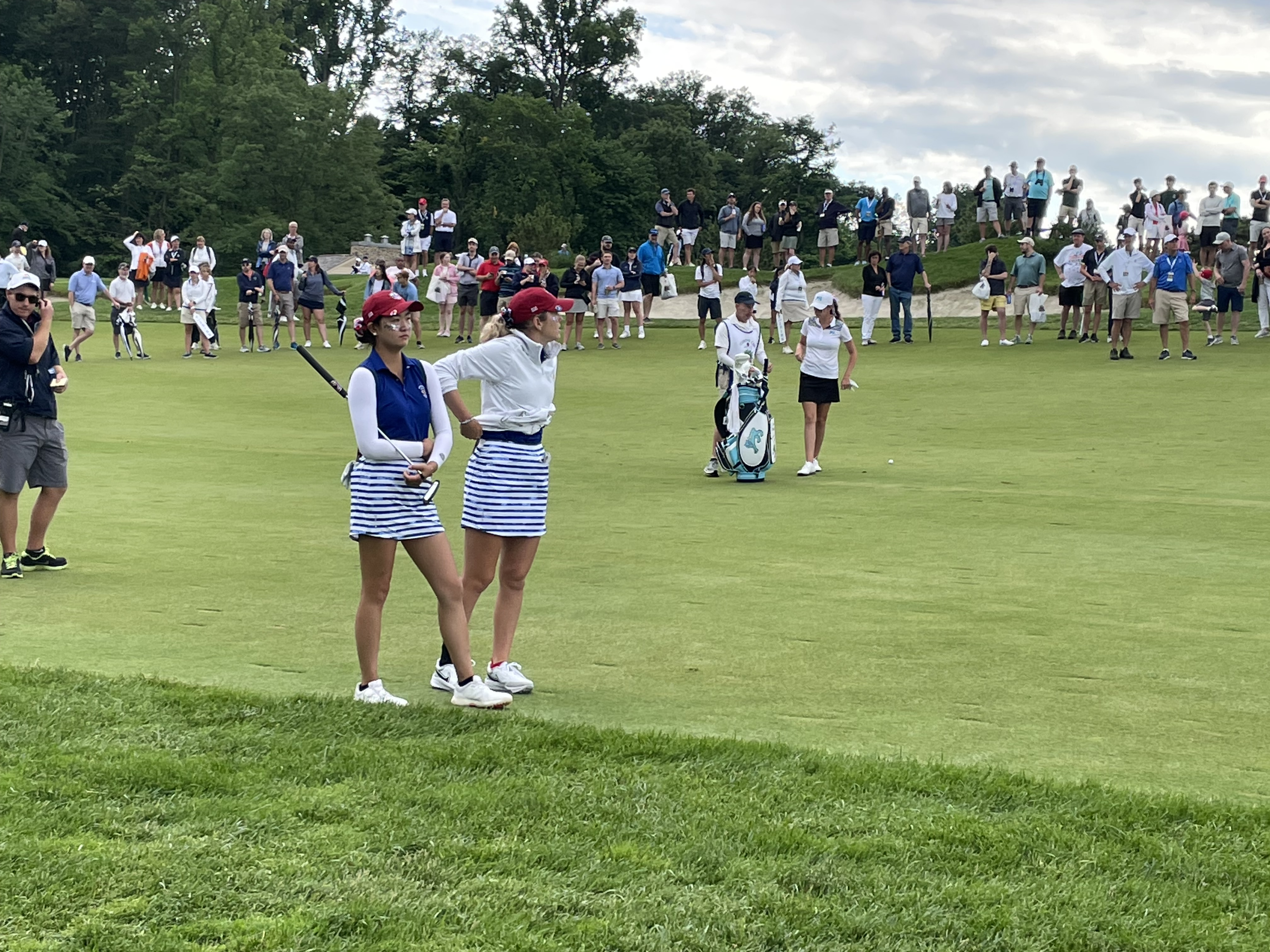
Rose Zhang and Heck (right) at the 2022 Curtis Cup.

Heck claimed medalist honors in the qualifier for the 2021 U.S. Women's Open in Novato, California, with a 36-hole total of 8-under 136. She finished 3rd at the Augusta National Women's Amateur and won The Spirit International Amateur Golf Championship with Team USA. Heck was the 2021 Honda Sports Award recipient and the Annika Award recipient for being the top collegiate golfer.

A bout of mononucleosis kept Heck out for part of her sophomore season; however, she would still win twice, sign Nike Golf's first ever NIL deal and help Stanford to the NCAA team championship. She would also win her second Curtis Cup. At the beginning of Heck's junior season, she began experiencing severe pain in her arm and shoulder and was diagnosed with thoracic outlet syndrome; the resulting physical therapy and surgery, which involved losing one of her ribs, caused her to miss most of the season. In her first significant tournament post-surgery, the 2023 U.S. Women's Amateur, Heck would advance to the semi-finals, but lost to Latanna Stone.

In her senior season, Heck made the decision to remain an amateur once her college career finished instead of pursuing a professional golf career. She would win the NCAA Cle Elum regional by four strokes, then help Stanford to another NCAA team championship, defeating UCLA's Kate Villegas by a score of 4 and 3 to win the deciding match. After her graduation from Stanford, Heck now works for Kohlberg Kravis Roberts, while also serving as a Second lieutenant in the Air Force Reserve Command.

In October 2025, Heck became the first recipient of the Annika Inspiration Award, presented by Cleveland Brothers in partnership with the Annika Foundation.

== Amateur wins ==
- 2016 Bubba Conlee Tournament
- 2017 Rolex Girls Junior Championship
- 2018 Polo Golf Junior Classic, Kathy Whitworth Invitational
- 2021 The Gunrock Invitational, Fresno State Classic, Pac-12 Women's Championship, NCAA Stanford Regional, NCAA Championship
- 2022 Lamkin San Diego Invitational, The Gunrock Invitational
- 2024 NCAA DI Cle Elum Regional

== Results in LPGA majors ==
Results not in chronological order before 2019 or in 2020.

Tournament	2017	2018	2019	2020	2021	2022
Chevron Championship			CUT			
U.S. Women's Open	T33				T35	
Women's PGA Championship						
The Evian Championship		T44		NT		T60
Women's British Open						

Did not play

CUT = missed the half-way cut
NT = no tournament
T = tied

== U.S. national team appearances ==
Amateur

- Junior Ryder Cup: 2018 (winners)
- Junior Solheim Cup: 2017 (winners), 2019 (winners)
- Curtis Cup: 2021 (winners), 2022 (winners)
- The Spirit International Amateur Golf Championship: 2021 (winners)
- Arnold Palmer Cup: 2022
- Espirito Santo Trophy: 2022
