= Rose Zhang =

American professional golfer (born 2003)

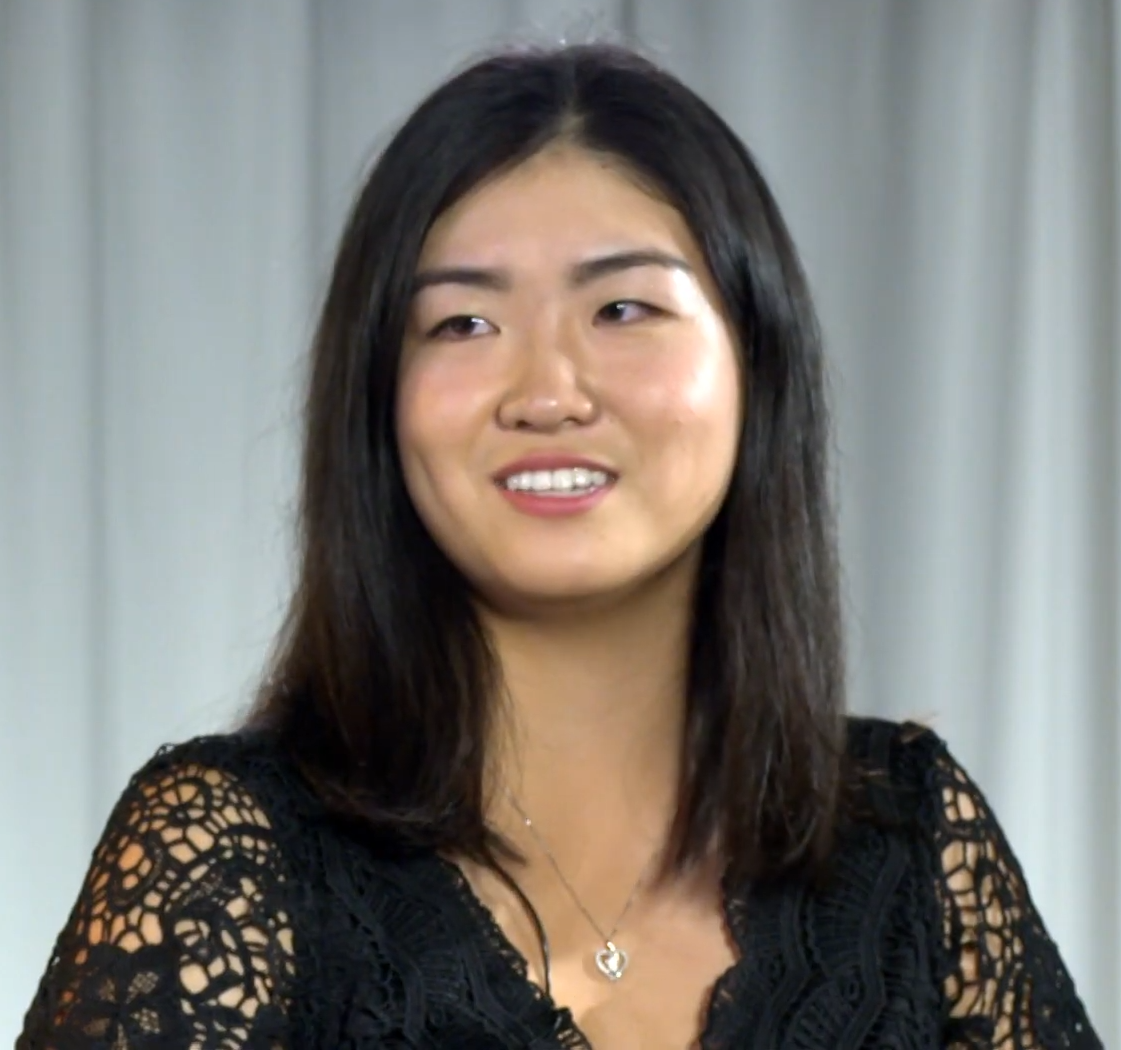
- Zhang in 2020

Personal information
- Nationality: United States
- Born: May 24, 2003 (age 23) Arcadia, California, U.S.
- Height: 5 ft 6.5 in (169 cm)

Career
- Sport: Golf
- College: Stanford University
- Turned professional: 2023
- Current tour: LPGA Tour (joined 2023)
- Professional wins: 2

Number of wins by tour
- LPGA Tour: 2

Best results in LPGA major championships
- Chevron Championship: T11: 2020
- Women's PGA C'ship: T8: 2023
- U.S. Women's Open: T9: 2023
- Women's British Open: T28: 2022
- Evian Championship: T9: 2023

Achievements and awards
- Mark H. McCormack Medal: 2020, 2021, 2022
- Smyth Salver Award: 2022
Medal record
Women's golf
Representing United States
Pan American Games
Gold medal – first place	2019 Lima	Mixed team

Rose Zhang (Chinese: 张斯洋; pinyin: Zhāng Sī Yáng born May 24, 2003) is an American professional golfer. She won the 2020 U.S. Women's Amateur, and both the 2022 and 2023 NCAA Division I Championships, becoming the first woman to win the individual title twice. She competed in the 2019 U.S. Women's Open and was on the gold medal team at the 2019 Pan American Games. Less than two weeks after turning pro, she became the first player to win in her professional debut on the LPGA Tour since 1951.

== Early and personal life ==
Zhang was born in Arcadia, California, and resides in Irvine, California. Her parents are Shenyang natives Haibin Zhang (father) and Li Cai, and her brother is Bill Sida Zhang, who is 10 years older.

She began playing golf at the age of 9. For high school, Zhang attended Pacific Academy where she was ranked twice as the world's top amateur female golfer. She enrolled at Stanford University in 2021, and has not declared an academic major.

Zhang has had the same swing coach, George Pinnell, since age 11. At the 2022 Carmel Cup, she established the women's course record of 9 under par at the Pebble Beach Golf Links, site of the 2023 U.S. Women's Open.

== Amateur career ==
In 2019 at age 16, Zhang was one of the youngest competitors in the inaugural Augusta National Women's Amateur, finishing in a tie for 17th place. She was named by the American Junior Golf Association as the 2019 Girls Rolex Junior Player of the Year. She competed in the 2019 U.S. Women's Open at age 16, finishing in a tie for 55th place at 7 over par. At the 2019 Pan American Games, she was on the winning U.S. mixed-gender team and placed eighth in the individual competition.

Zhang won the U.S. Women's Amateur in August 2020 after defeating Gabriela Ruffels in the final on the 38th hole. In September 2020, Zhang became the top-ranked women's golfer in the World Amateur Golf Ranking after a tie for 11th place and finishing as low amateur at the 2020 ANA Inspiration, an LPGA major championship. In 2021, she won the U.S. Girls' Junior. She was awarded the Mark H. McCormack Medal as the top-ranked women's amateur golfer in the world for three consecutive years (2020–22).

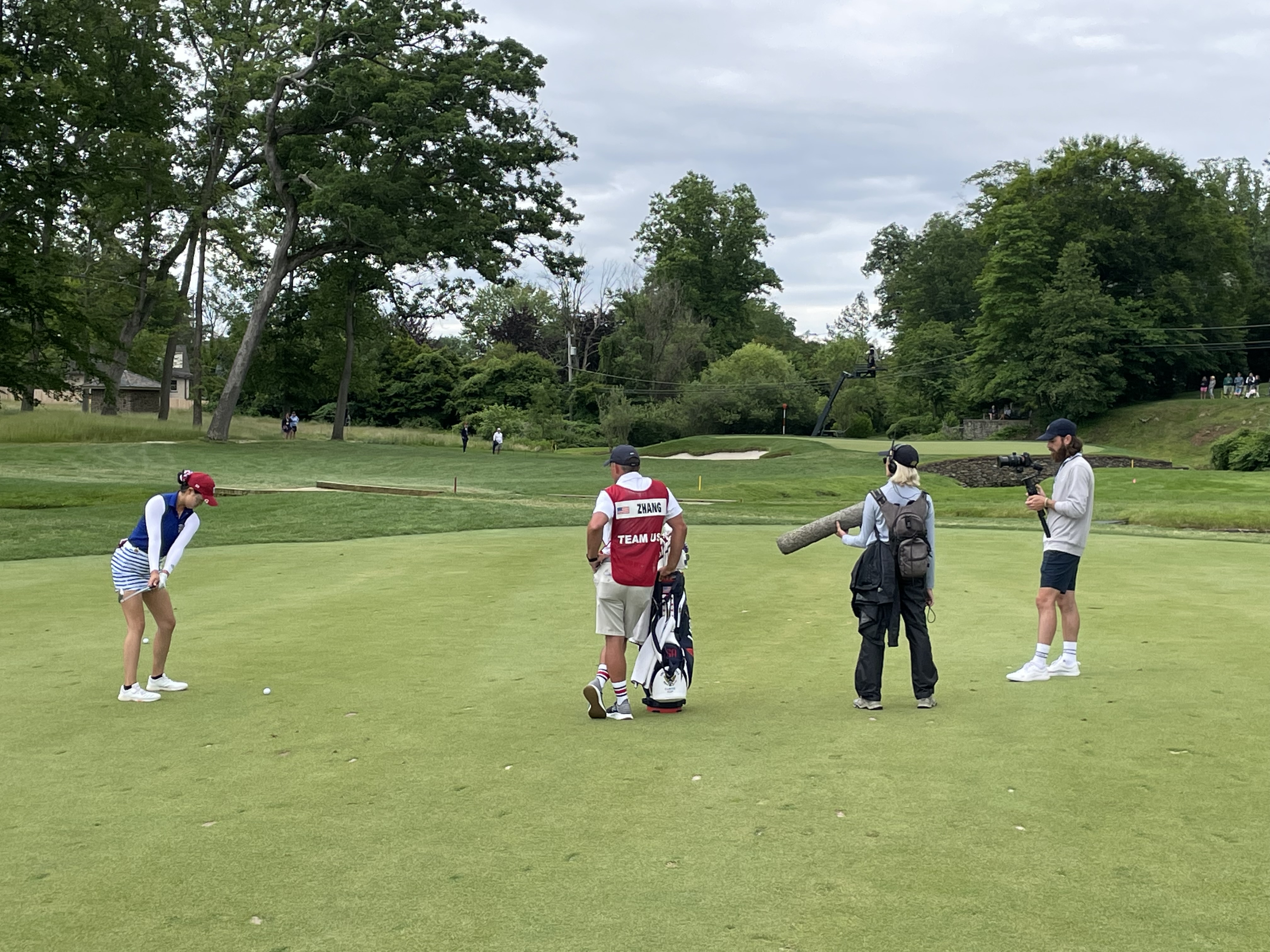
Zhang at the 2022 Curtis Cup.

In May 2022, Zhang won the individual NCAA Championship by 3 shots. On her 19th birthday, she was presented with the Annika Award as the top female college golfer of the year. She finished the 2022 Women's British Open in a tie for 28th, earning the Smyth Salver Award as the low amateur.

On April 1, 2023, Zhang won the Augusta National Women's Amateur on the second playoff hole over Jenny Bae. Also in April, she became the female golfer ranked number one in the World Amateur Golf Ranking for 141 weeks, the most of any player in history. In May 2023, Zhang won the individual NCAA Championship for the second consecutive year, becoming the first woman in NCAA women's golf history to win the individual national championship twice. Her 68.80 scoring average over 31 rounds in the 2022–23 season is the lowest in NCAA women's golf history, bettering the record her Stanford teammate Rachel Heck had set the previous year.

== Sponsorships ==
In June 2022, Adidas announced its first name, image, and likeness (NIL) deal with Zhang for her apparel, golf shoes and accessories, making her the company's first sponsored student athlete. The multi-year deal was announced on the morning of Zhang entering the U.S. Women's Open.

Other sponsorships established before her professional debut were with Callaway for her golf clubs, ball, and bag, Delta Air Lines, East West Bank, and USwing Eyewear. Other NIL deals exist with Rolex for her watch and Beats by Dre for headphones. In July at the U.S. Women's Open, Zhang began a multiyear sponsorship deal with AT&T.

== Professional career ==
Zhang announced her intention to play professionally on May 26, 2023. In June 2023, at her first tournament as a professional, Zhang won the Mizuho Americas Open by defeating Jennifer Kupcho on the second hole of a sudden-death playoff at Liberty National Golf Club. Zhang became the first player to win in her professional debut on the LPGA Tour since Beverly Hanson in 1951 and the most recent non-member to win in her first LPGA event since Hinako Shibuno in 2019. In May 2024, she won the Cognizant Founders Cup, snapping Nelly Korda's record-tying LPGA Tour winning streak.

== Amateur wins ==
- 2016 AJGA - CJGT Junior at Yorba Linda
- 2017 Junior PGA Championship, Junior America's Cup
- 2018 ANA Junior Inspiration, Swinging Skirts AJGA Invitational, The PING Invitational
- 2019 Toyota Junior World Cup, Swinging Skirts AJGA Invitational, Rolex Tournament of Champions
- 2020 U.S. Women's Amateur, Rolex Girls Junior Championship, The PING Invitational, Rolex Tournament of Champions
- 2021 U.S. Girls' Junior, Molly Collegiate Invitational, Windy City Collegiate Classic, Stanford Intercollegiate, Spirit International Amateur Championship (individual)
- 2022 NCAA Championship, Carmel Cup, Stanford Intercollegiate, Nanea Pac-12 Preview
- 2023 T. Hession Regional Challenge, Juli Inkster Meadow Club Collegiate, Augusta National Women's Amateur, Pac-12 Conference Championship (individual), NCAA Pullman Regional, NCAA Championship

== Professional wins (2) ==
=== LPGA Tour wins (2) ===
Legend
Major championships (0)
Other LPGA Tour (2)

No.	Date	Tournament	Winning score	To par	Margin of victory	Runner-up	Winner's share ($)
1	Jun 4, 2023	Mizuho Americas Open	70-69-66-74=279	−9	Playoff	(United States) Jennifer Kupcho	412,500
2	May 12, 2024	Cognizant Founders Cup	63-68-67-66=264	−24	2 strokes	(Sweden) Madelene Sagstrom	450,000

LPGA Tour playoff record (1–0)

No.	Year	Tournament	Opponents	Result
1	2023	Mizuho Americas Open	(United States) Jennifer Kupcho	Won with par on second extra hole

== Results in LPGA majors ==
Results not in chronological order.

Tournament	2018	2019	2020	2021	2022	2023	2024	2025	2026
Chevron Championship	T60		T11 LA				CUT		CUT
U.S. Women's Open				CUT	T40	T9	CUT	CUT	T45
Women's PGA Championship						T8	T35	73	T53
The Evian Championship			NT	T58	T65	T9	T39	T35	T41
Women's British Open				CUT	T28 LA	T44	T29	CUT	T47

Top 10
Did not play

LA = low amateur
CUT = missed the half-way cut
NT = no tournament
"T" = tied

=== Summary ===
Tournament	Wins	2nd	3rd	Top-5	Top-10	Top-25	Events	Cuts made
Chevron Championship	0	0	0	0	0	1	4	2
U.S. Women's Open	0	0	0	0	1	1	6	3
Women's PGA Championship	0	0	0	0	1	1	4	4
The Evian Championship	0	0	0	0	1	1	6	6
Women's British Open	0	0	0	0	0	0	6	4
Totals	0	0	0	0	3	4	26	19

- Most consecutive cuts made – 7 (2022 U.S. Women's Open – 2023 Women's British)
- Longest streak of top-10s – 3 (2023 WPGA – 2023 Evian)

== LPGA Tour career summary ==
Year	Tournaments played	Cuts made*	Wins	2nd	3rd	Top 10s	Best finish	Earnings ($)	Money list rank	Scoring average	Scoring rank
2018	2	2	0	0	0	0	T60	0	n/a	74.88	n/a
2019	2	2	0	0	0	0	T55	0	n/a	73.25	n/a
2020	2	1	0	0	0	0	T11	0	n/a	71.00	n/a
2021	4	2	0	0	0	0	T33	0	n/a	71.83	n/a
2022	3	3	0	0	0	0	T28	0	n/a	71.83	n/a
2023	13**	11	1	0	1	4	1	1,389,794	21	70.35	18
2024	21	16	1	0	0	5	1	1,137,159	25	70.88	25
2025	14	7	0	0	0	2	T5	343,538	79	71.17	51
Totals	48 (2023)	34 (2023)	2	0	1	11	1	2,870,491	172		

Official as of 2025 season
*Includes matchplay and other tournaments without a cut.
** 13 tournaments entered in 2023, not credited for Mizuho Americas Open Tournament or for that top 10, as not an LPGA member until after.

== World ranking ==
Position in Women's World Golf Rankings at the end of each calendar year.

Year	Ranking	Source
2018	788	
2019	669	
2020	288	
2021	283	
2022	349	
2023	26	
2024	14	
2025	62	

== U.S. national team appearances ==
Amateur

- Junior Solheim Cup: 2017 (winners), 2019 (winners)
- Junior Ryder Cup: 2018 (winners)
- Curtis Cup: 2021 (winners), 2022 (winners)
- Spirit International Amateur: 2021 (winners)
- Arnold Palmer Cup: 2022
- Espirito Santo Trophy: 2022

Professional

- Solheim Cup: 2023 (tied, Europe retained cup), 2024 (winners), 2026

=== Solheim Cup record ===
Year	Total matches	Total W–L–H	Singles W–L–H	Foursomes W–L–H	Fourballs W–L–H	Points won	Points %
Career	11	6–4–1	2–1–0	1–2–0	3–1–1	6.5	59.1
2023	3	0–2–1	0–1–0 lost to L. Maguire 4&3	0–0–0	0–1–1 halved w/ M. Khang lost w/ A. Lee 2&1	0.5	16.7
2024	4	4–0–0	1–0–0 def. C. Ciganda 6&4	1–0–0 won w/ L. Coughlin 3&2	2–0–0 won w/ An. Lee 5&4 won w/ An. Lee 6&4	4.0	100.0
2026	4	2–2–0	1–0–0 def. C. Boutier 2 up	0–2–0 lost w/ J. Kupcho 3&2 lost w/ J. Kupcho 1 dn	1–0–0 won w/ A. Kim 3&2	2.0	50.0
