= 2014 Women's British Open =

Coordinates: 53.622°N 3.033°W

2014 Ricoh Women's British Open
Tournament information
- Dates: 10–13 July 2014
- Location: Southport, England
- Course: Royal Birkdale Golf Club
- Organized by: Ladies' Golf Union
- Tours: Ladies European Tour; LPGA Tour

Statistics
- Par: 72
- Length: 6,458 yards (5,905 m)
- Field: 144 players, 70 after cut
- Cut: 150 (+6)
- Prize fund: $3,000,000 €2,204,591 £1,756,647
- Winner's share: $474,575 €348,748 £277,887

Champion
- (United States) Mo Martin
- 287 (−1)
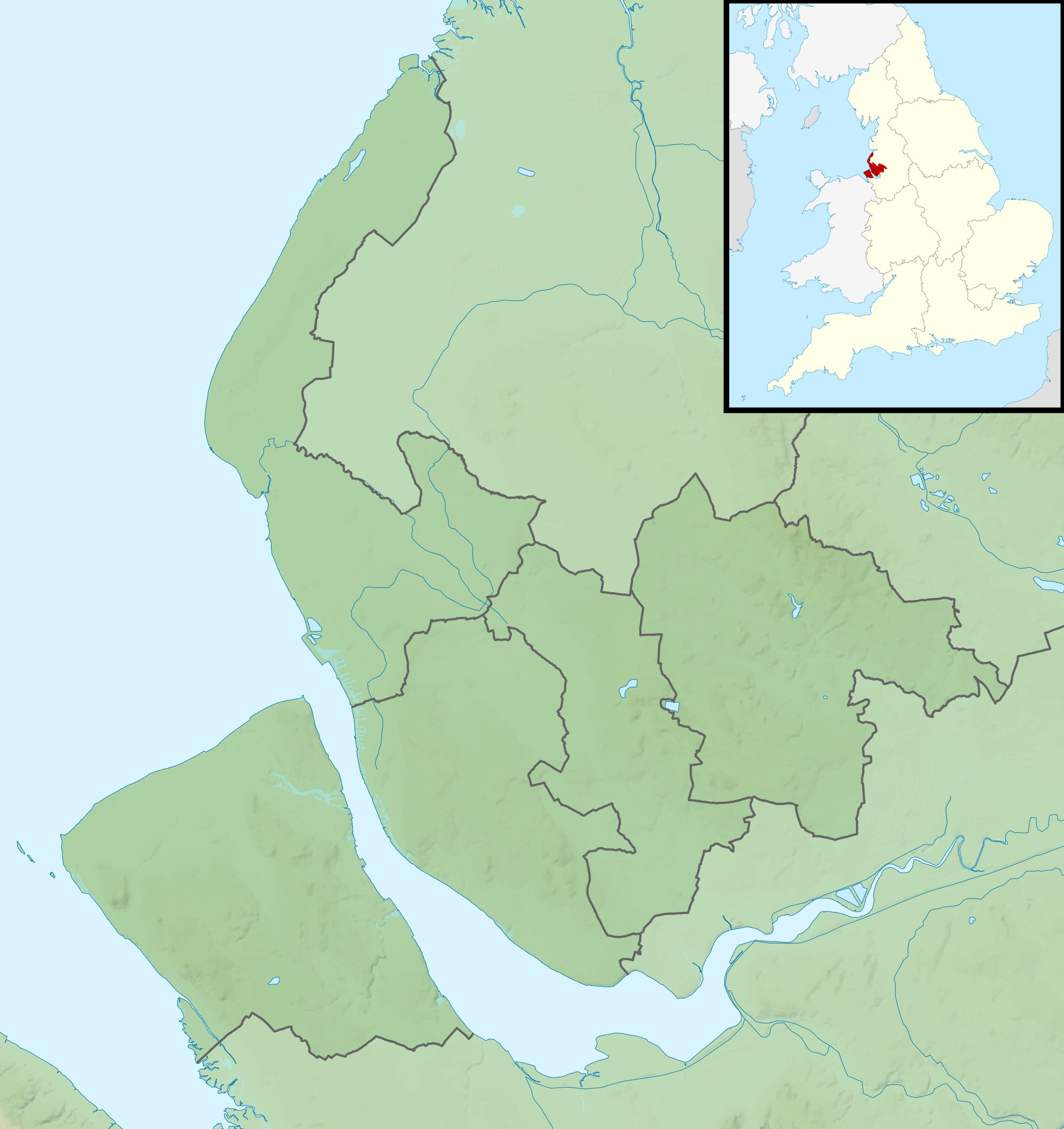
- Location in England Location in Merseyside, north of Liverpool Location in Southport

The 2014 Ricoh Women's British Open was played 10–13 July at the Royal Birkdale Golf Club in Southport, England. It was the 38th Women's British Open, and the 14th as a major championship on the LPGA Tour. It was the sixth Women's British Open at Royal Birkdale, the most recent was four years earlier in 2010. ESPN and BBC Sport televised the event from Royal Birkdale.

Mo Martin won her first major, one shot ahead of runners-up Shanshan Feng and Suzann Pettersen. Martin led after 36 holes at 138 (−6) after consecutive rounds of 69, but fell three shots back with a 77 (+5) on Saturday, tied with six others for seventh place. An hour ahead of the final pair on a clear and breezy Sunday, she shot even par, capped by an eagle at the final hole. Her second shot from the fairway on the par 5 nearly holed out for an albatross (double eagle); it rolled onto the green and struck the flagstick, stopping six feet (1.8 m) away. She sank the putt and waited for the others to finish, preparing for a potential playoff. It was Martin's first win on the LPGA Tour, and moved her from 99 to 26 in the women's world rankings.

== Field ==
The field for the tournament was set at 144, and most earned exemptions based on past performance on the Ladies European Tour, the LPGA Tour, previous major championships, or with a high ranking in the Women's World Golf Rankings. The rest of the field earned entry by successfully competing in qualifying tournaments open to any female golfer, professional or amateur, with a low handicap.

There were 16 exemption categories for the 2014 Women's British Open.

1. The top 15 finishers (and ties) from the 2013 Women's British Open.
  - Na Yeon Choi (10), Paula Creamer (7,10), Mamiko Higa, Meena Lee, Stacy Lewis (7,9,10), Pernilla Lindberg, Catriona Matthew (9), Anna Nordqvist (7,10), Hee Young Park, Suzann Pettersen (8), Morgan Pressel, Miki Saiki
  - Nicole Castrale, Natalie Gulbis, and Lizette Salas (7) did not play
2. The top 10 Ladies European Tour members in the Women's World Golf Rankings not already exempt under category 1.
  - Jodi Ewart Shadoff, Shanshan Feng (10), Sandra Gal, Caroline Hedwall, Charley Hull (7), Karine Icher, Ariya Jutanugarn, Ai Miyazato, Azahara Muñoz, Beatriz Recari
3. The top 30 LPGA Tour members in the Women's World Golf Rankings not already exempt under category 1.
  - Chella Choi, Carlota Ciganda, Haeji Kang, Cristie Kerr (10), Christina Kim, I.K. Kim (7), Lydia Ko (7), Jessica Korda (7), Ilhee Lee, Brittany Lincicome, Mika Miyazato, Se Ri Pak, Inbee Park (7,8,10), Pornanong Phatlum, Gerina Piller, So Yeon Ryu (10), Jenny Shin, Angela Stanford, Lexi Thompson (7,10), Yani Tseng (9,10), Karrie Webb (7), Michelle Wie (7,10), Amy Yang
4. The top 25 on the current LET money list not already exempt under category 1 or 2.
  - Beth Allen, Maria Balikoeva, Stacy Lee Bregman, Hannah Burke, Nikki Campbell, Holly Clyburn, Laura Davies, Valentine Derrey (7), Sophie Giquel-Bettan, Trish Johnson, Malene Jørgensen, Sarah Kemp, Vikki Laing, Camilla Lennarth, Amelia Lewis, Diana Luna, Gwladys Nocera, Lee-Anne Pace, Titiya Plucksataporn, Marion Ricordeau, Klára Spilková, Kylie Walker (7), Sophie Walker, Linda Wessberg, Cheyenne Woods (7)
5. The top 40 on the current LPGA Tour money list not already exempt under category 1 or 3.
  - Amy Anderson, Christel Boeljon, Katie Burnett, Dori Carter, Paz Echeverria, Austin Ernst, Julieta Granada, Mina Harigae, Eun-Hee Ji, Tiffany Joh, Danielle Kang, Kim Kaufman, P.K. Kongkraphan, Candie Kung, Brittany Lang, Mi Hyang Lee (7), Mirim Lee, Mo Martin, Caroline Masson, Belen Mozo, Haru Nomura, Brooke Pancake, Dewi Claire Schreefel, Giulia Sergas, Sarah Jane Smith, Thidapa Suwannapura, Ayako Uehara, Mariajo Uribe, Line Vedel, Alison Walshe, Sun-Young Yoo (10)
6. The top five on the current LPGA of Japan Tour (JLPGA) money list not already exempt under category 1, 2, 3 or 11.
  - Ahn Sun-ju, Haruna Erina Hara, Misuzu Narita, Onnarin Sattayabanphot, Ayaka Watanabe
7. Winners of any recognised LET or LPGA Tour events in the calendar year 2014.
  - Florentyna Parker
8. Winners of the 2013 LET, LPGA, JLPGA and KLPGA money lists.
  - Rikako Morita
9. Winners of the last 10 editions of the Women's British Open.
  - Jeong Jang, Jiyai Shin, Sherri Steinhauer, Karen Stupples
  - Lorena Ochoa did not play
10. Winners of the last five editions of the U.S. Women's Open, Kraft Nabisco Championship, and LPGA Championship.
11. Winner of the 2013 Japan LPGA Tour Championship Ricoh Cup.
  - Shiho Oyama
12. The leading five LPGA Tour members upon completion of 36 holes in the 2014 Manulife Financial LPGA Classic who have entered the Championship and who are not otherwise exempt.
  - Marina Alex, Jacqu Concolino, Jee Young Lee, Xi Yu Lin, Kristy McPherson
13. The leading three LET members in the 2014 ISPS Handa Ladies European Masters, who have entered the Championship and who are not otherwise exempt.
  - Amy Boulden (a), Hannah Jun Medlock, Sally Watson
14. The 2014 British Ladies Amateur champion, 2013 U.S. Women's Amateur champion, 2013 International European Ladies Amateur Championship champion, winner or next available player in the 2013 LGU Order of Merit, and the Mark H. McCormack Medal holder provided they are still amateurs at the time of the Championship and a maximum of two other leading amateurs at the discretion of the Ladies' Golf Union.
  - Georgia Hall, Emily Kristine Pedersen, Emma Talley
  - Lydia Ko, Mark H. McCormack Medal winner, turned pro in October 2013 forfeiting this exemption. She later qualified in categories 3 and 7.
15. Any players granted special exemptions from qualifying by the Championship Committee.
  - Minjee Lee (a)
16. Balance of the 90 LPGA Tour members
  - Joanna Klatten, Ji Young Oh, Alena Sharp, Ashleigh Simon

Qualifiers:

- Holly Aitchison, Bree Arthur, Laetitia Beck, Becky Brewerton, Cathryn Bristow, Katie Futcher, Stacey Keating, Louise Larsson, Stephanie Meadow, Stephanie Na, Su-Hyun Oh (a), Marianne Skarpnord, Nontaya Srisawang, Lauren Taylor, Liz Young
- Lucy Williams replaced Lizette Salas

== Course ==
Hole	1	2	3	4	5	6	7	8	9	Out	10	11	12	13	14	15	16	17	18	In	Total
Yards	430	410	373	175	338	478	145	413	397	3,159	360	352	149	430	163	499	358	516	472	3,299	6,458
Par	4	4	4	3	4	5	3	4	4	35	4	4	3	4	3	5	4	5	5	37	72

Previous lengths of the course for the Women's British Open (since 2001):

- 2010: 6,458 yards (5,905 m), par 72
- 2005: 6,463 yards (5,910 m), par 72

== Round summaries ==
=== First round ===
Thursday, 10 July 2014

Place	Player	Score	To par
1	(Japan) Ayako Uehara	68	−4
2	(United States) Mo Martin	69	−3
T3	(United States) Mina Harigae	70	−2
T3	(Australia) Sarah Kemp	70	−2
T3	(United States) Morgan Pressel	70	−2
T6	(England) Holly Clyburn	71	−1
T6	(United States) Stacy Lewis	71	−1
T6	(South Korea) So Yeon Ryu	71	−1
T6	(South Korea) Amy Yang	71	−1
T10	(United States) Marina Alex	72	E
T10	(Paraguay) Julieta Granada	72	E
T10	(New Zealand) Lydia Ko	72	E
T10	(United States) Jessica Korda	72	E
T10	(United States) Amelia Lewis	72	E
T10	(Japan) Ai Miyazato	72	E
T10	(Spain) Azahara Muñoz	72	E
T10	(Sweden) Anna Nordqvist	72	E
T10	(South Korea) Inbee Park	72	E
T10	(Norway) Suzann Pettersen	72	E
T10	(South Korea) Jiyai Shin	72	E
T10	(United States) Emma Talley (a)	72	E
T10	(United States) Lexi Thompson	72	E
T10	(Australia) Karrie Webb	72	E

=== Second round ===
Friday, 11 July 2014

Place	Player	Score	To par
1	(United States) Mo Martin	69-69=138	−6
T2	(Spain) Beatriz Recari	74-67=141	−3
T2	(South Korea) So Yeon Ryu	71-70=141	−3
T4	(South Korea) Sun-Ju Ahn	75-67=142	−2
T4	(Paraguay) Julieta Granada	72-70=142	−2
T6	(Thailand) Ariya Jutanugarn	75-68=143	−1
T6	(United States) Amelia Lewis	72-71=143	−1
T6	(France) Gwladys Nocera	73-70=143	−1
T6	(South Korea) Amy Yang	71-72=143	−1
T10	(China) Shanshan Feng	73-71=144	E
T10	(South Korea) Eun-Hee Ji	74-70=144	E
T10	(United States) Jessica Korda	72-72=144	E
T10	(Spain) Azahara Muñoz	72-72=144	E
T10	(South Korea) Inbee Park	72-72=144	E
T10	(United States) Morgan Pressel	70-74=144	E

=== Third round ===
Saturday, 12 July 2014

Place	Player	Score	To par
1	(South Korea) Inbee Park	72-72-68=212	−4
T2	(South Korea) Sun-Ju Ahn	75-67-71=213	−3
T2	(China) Shanshan Feng	73-71-69=213	−3
T2	(Norway) Suzann Pettersen	72-73-68=213	−3
T5	(Paraguay) Julieta Granada	72-70-72=214	−2
T5	(United States) Amelia Lewis	72-71-71=214	−2
T7	(England) Charley Hull	73-76-66=215	−1
T7	(South Korea) Eun-Hee Ji	74-70-71=215	−1
T7	(United States) Stacy Lewis	71-74-70=215	−1
T7	(United States) Mo Martin	69-69-77=215	−1
T7	(Spain) Beatriz Recari	74-67-74=215	−1
T7	(South Korea) So-Yeon Ryu	71-70-74=215	−1
T7	(South Korea) Amy Yang	71-72-72=215	−1

=== Final round ===
Sunday, 13 July 2014

Place	Player	Score	To par	Money ($)
1	(United States) Mo Martin	69-69-77-72=287	−1	474,575
T2	(China) Shanshan Feng	73-71-69-75=288	E	235,204
T2	(Norway) Suzann Pettersen	72-73-68-75=288	E	235,204
4	(South Korea) Inbee Park	72-72-68-77=289	+1	151,532
T5	(Paraguay) Julieta Granada	72-70-72-77=291	+3	104,425
T5	(South Korea) Eun-Hee Ji	74-70-71-76=291	+3	104,425
T5	(United States) Jessica Korda	72-72-73-74=291	+3	104,425
T5	(United States) Angela Stanford	74-72-70-75=291	+3	104,425
T9	(South Korea) Sun-Ju Ahn	75-67-71-79=292	+4	72,911
T9	(United States) Marina Alex	72-76-68-76=292	+4	72,911
T9	(England) Laura Davies	75-72-72-73=292	+4	72,911

Amateurs: Talley (+6), Hall (+9).

==== Scorecard ====
Final round

Hole	1	2	3	4	5	6	7	8	9	10	11	12	13	14	15	16	17	18
Par	4	4	4	3	4	5	3	4	4	4	4	3	4	3	5	4	5	5
(United States) Martin	E	E	E	E	+1	E	E	E	E	E	E	E	+1	+1	+1	+1	+1	−1
(China) Feng	−3	−2	−1	E	−1	−2	−1	−1	−1	−1	−1	−1	−1	−1	−1	E	E	E
(Norway) Pettersen	−1	−1	−1	−1	−1	−2	−2	−1	−1	E	E	E	+2	+2	+2	+2	+1	E
(South Korea) Park	−4	−3	−3	−2	−2	−3	−3	−2	−3	−1	E	E	−1	E	E	E	E	+1
(South Korea) Ahn	−1	+1	+1	+1	+1	E	E	E	E	+1	+2	+4	+4	+4	+4	+5	+4	+4

Cumulative tournament scores, relative to par

Eagle	Birdie	Bogey	Double bogey
