= Sofie Andersson =

Swedish professional golfer

Sofie Andersson Aagaard
Personal information
- Nationality: Sweden
- Born: 6 June 1983 (age 43) Ängelholm, Sweden
- Height: 1.70 m (5 ft 7 in)
- Spouse: Christian Aagaard (m. 2012)

Career
- Sport: Golf
- College: Mississippi State University; University of California, Berkeley
- Turned professional: 2007
- Former tour: Symetra Tour (2007–2010)
- Professional wins: 1

Number of wins by tour
- Epson Tour: 1

Best results in LPGA major championships
- Chevron Championship: DNP
- Women's PGA C'ship: DNP
- U.S. Women's Open: CUT: 2010, 2011
- Women's British Open: DNP

Achievements and awards
- California Athletics Hall of Fame: 2021
- Big West Women's Golf Coach of the Year: 2016, 2017, 2021, 2022

Sofie Andersson Aagaard (born 6 June 1983) is a Swedish professional golfer who played mainly on the United States–based Futures Tour. She competed on tour as Sofie Andersson, adding Aagaard after her marriage in November 2012.

== Amateur career ==
As an amateur, Andersson represented the Swedish National Team from 1999 to 2006. In 2004, she captured Sweden's first World Amateur Team Championships gold medal at the competition in Puerto Rico with Karin Sjödin and Louise Stahle. Two years later at the same event held in South Africa, she won the silver medal together with Anna Nordqvist and Caroline Westrup. She made her debut on the Ladies European Tour at the 2005 Scandinavian TPC hosted by Annika where she missed the cut.

Andersson began her college career as a freshman at Mississippi State University, earning SEC second-team all-conference honors before transferring to University of California, Berkeley in 2003, where she was a three-time NCAA Division I All-American and a member of the team finishing in the top five at the NCAA Championships three years in a row 2004 to 2006. Andersson finished her career with a school-record 74.2 average and was a two-time All-West Region honoree and twice earned All-Pac-10 Conference second-team accolades in 2005 and 2006, in addition to All-Pac-10 honorable mention praise in 2004. Her highest NCAA finish was sixth place in 2004, and in 2005 she captured the Spartan Invitational individual title, as part of a total of 16 individual top-10 finishes.

== Professional career ==
Andersson turned professional in 2007 and joined the 2007 Duramed Futures Tour (later renamed Epson Tour), the second-tier women's professional golf tour in the United States and official developmental tour of the LPGA Tour. During her rookie year she had her first professional career win, the Aurora Health Care Championship at Lake Geneva, Wisconsin. After three other top ten finishes she ended the season 16th on the money list. She lost the 2009 Michelob Ultra Duramed Futures Players Championship in a playoff with Mina Harigae, who won on the first hole of a playoff.

Andersson competed in the 2010 U.S. Women's Open (Oakmont) and the 2011 U.S. Women's Open (Broadmoor).

== Coaching career ==
In 2015 Andersson was appointed head coach of women's golf at California Polytechnic State University and became a four-time Big West Coach of the Year.

She was inducted into the California Athletics Hall of Fame in 2021.

In 2022, she became women's head golf coach at Washington State University.

== Professional wins ==
=== Symetra Tour (1) ===
No.	Date	Tournament	Winning score	Margin of victory	Runners-up
1	Jun 17, 2007	Aurora Health Care Championship	−4 (70-72-70=212)	1 stroke	(United States) Brandi Jackson, (United States) Esther Choe

Symetra Tour playoff record (0–1)

No.	Year	Tournament	Opponent	Result
1	2009	Michelob Ultra Duramed Futures Players Championship	(United States) Mina Harigae	Lost to par on first extra hole

== Team appearances ==
Amateur

- Espirito Santo Trophy (representing Sweden): 2004 (winners), 2006
- European Ladies' Team Championship (representing Sweden): 2003, 2005
