= Vikki Laing =

Scottish professional golfer (born 1981)

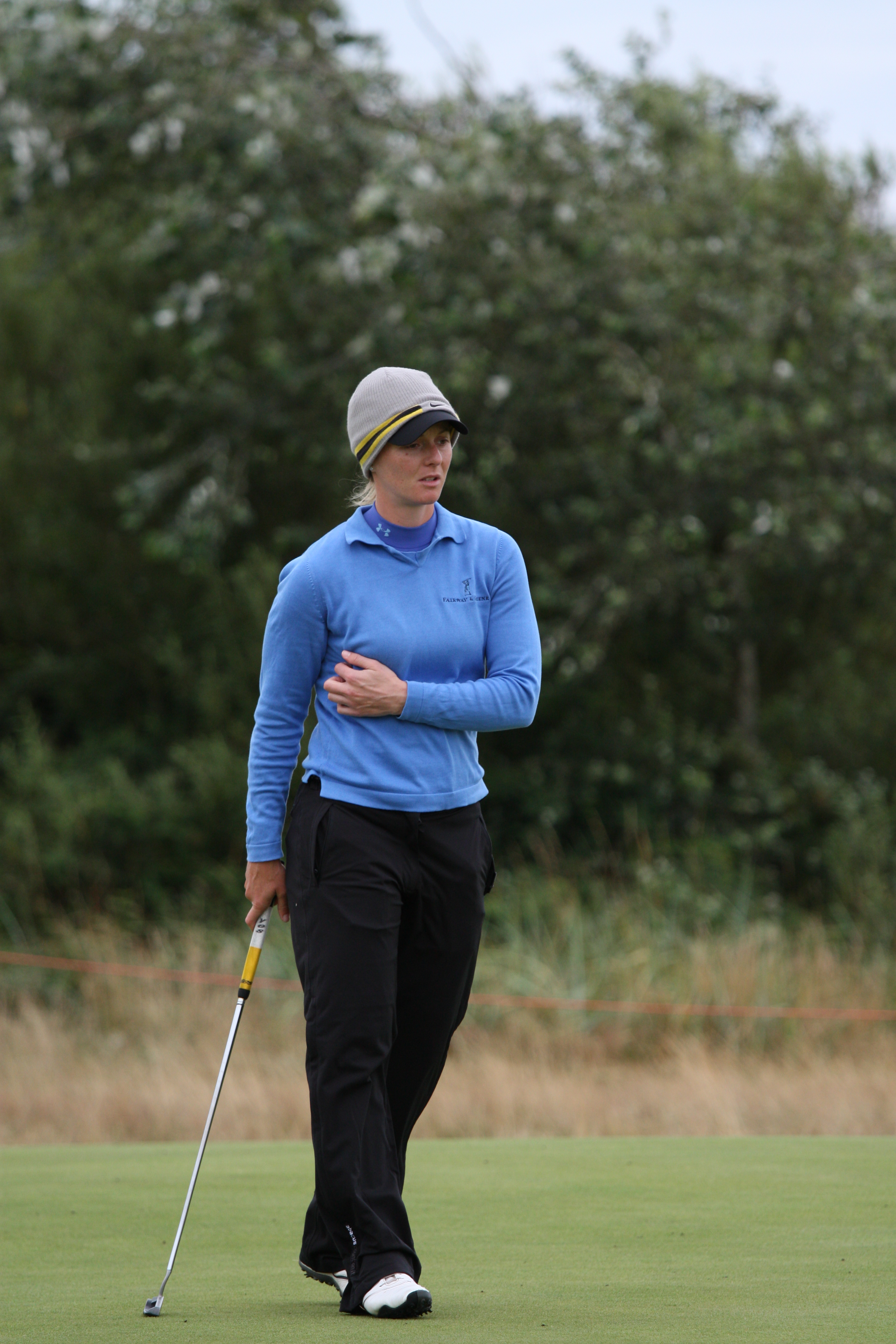
- Laing at the 2009 Women's British Open

Personal information
- Nationality: Scotland
- Born: 14 March 1981 (age 45) Musselburgh, Scotland
- Height: 5 ft 6 in (1.68 m)

Career
- Sport: Golf
- College: University of California, Berkeley
- Turned professional: 2003
- Current tour: Ladies European Tour
- Former tours: LPGA Tour; Futures Tour
- Professional wins: 1

Number of wins by tour
- Epson Tour: 1

Best results in LPGA major championships
- Chevron Championship: DNP
- Women's PGA C'ship: DNP
- U.S. Women's Open: DNP
- Women's British Open: T62: 2014
- Evian Championship: DNP

Achievements and awards
- California Athletics Hall of Fame: 2016

Vikki Laing (born 14 March 1981) is a Scottish professional golfer who played on the U.S.-based Futures Tour and the Ladies European Tour (LET), finishing 10th in the 2010 LET rankings.

After a promising amateur career, Laing turned professional in the U.S. with high hopes in 2003 but never quite managed to fulfill her potential, as illustrated by her LET career earnings of just over £300,000. She finished runner-up five times on the LET and ALPG Tour, another professional win proving elusive after The Gettysburg Championship in 2007.

== Amateur career ==
Laing is from Musselburgh, Scotland, and represented Europe in the 1997 Junior Ryder Cup and represented Great Britain & Ireland in the 2002 Curtis Cup. Representing Scotland, she finished third individually at the 1997 European Young Masters. She attended University of California, Berkeley where she won her first tournament in the fall of her freshman year, becoming just the third Bear women's golfer to earn individual medalist honors at the time. She captured the individual Pac-10 Championship title as a senior in 2003 and later earned second-team All-America recognition, the first Golden Bear to receive the honor. A two-time first-team All-Pac-10 choice, she made the all-region team as a senior. She helped the California Golden Bears to their first three berths at the NCAA Championships 2001–2003 and to the 2003 NCAA Central Regional title. In 2016, she was inducted into the California Athletics Hall of Fame.

== Professional career ==
Laing turned professional in 2003 but a limiting category led to a frustrating year on the 2004 LPGA Tour, where she were first alternate on four occasions without getting in and on her debut at the Giant Eagle LPGA Classic she missed the cut by one shot. She got the opportunity to tee it up for the second time at the State Farm Rail Classic in Springfield, Illinois, where she made her first LPGA Tour cut. In 2005 she played just 8 LPGA tournaments.

In 2006 she dropped down to play on the Duramed Futures Tour (later renamed Symetra Tour), the second-tier women's professional golf tour in the United States and the "official developmental tour" of the LPGA Tour. In 2007 she had her first professional career win, in The Gettysburg Championship. She also finished runner-up at the 2007 Betty Puskar Golf Classic and the 2008 Duramed Invitational, one stroke behind Vicky Hurst.

In 2009, Laing joined the Ladies European Tour where she had her best season in 2010, finishing runner-up at the Deutsche Bank Ladies Swiss Open and the Finnair Masters, both behind Lee-Anne Pace, and ended the season in 10th spot on the Order of Merit. In 2011, she was runner-up at the Sanya Ladies Open, a tournament co-sanctioned by the China LPGA Tour, Ladies Asian Golf Tour and the LET.

Laing participated in the "Australian Swing", and on the ALPG Tour finished runner-up at the 2014 Women's Victorian Open and 2015 New South Wales Women's Open.

At her first major, the 2009 Women's British Open, Laing was T7 after the first round but fell back to an eventual 66th place. She scored an albatross at the 2014 Women's British Open at Royal Birkdale Golf Club, only the fourth albatross to be recorded at women's major golf championships. Following the tournament she rose to a career high of 143 on the Women's World Golf Rankings, and she featured in the top 150 also in 2010 and 2015.

== Amateur wins ==
- 2000 St Rule Trophy
- 2003 Pac-10 Championship

== Professional wins ==
=== Futures Tour (1) ===
No.	Date	Tournament	Winning score	To par	Margin of victory	Runner-up	Winner's share ($)
1	26 Aug 2007	The Gettysburg Championship	70-68-69=207	−9	3 strokes	(Mexico) Violeta Retamoza	14,000

== Team appearances ==
Amateur

- Junior Ryder Cup (representing Europe): 1997
- European Young Masters (representing Scotland): 1997
- European Ladies' Team Championship (representing Scotland): 2001, 2003
- Curtis Cup (representing Great Britain & Ireland): 2002
- Vagliano Trophy (representing Great Britain & Ireland): 2003 (winners)
