= The Gettysburg Championship =

The Gettysburg Championship was an annual golf tournament for professional women golfers on the Futures Tour, the LPGA Tour's developmental tour. The event was played from 2006 to 2008 in the Gettysburg, Pennsylvania area.

The tournament was a 54-hole event, as are most Futures Tour tournaments, and included pre-tournament pro-am opportunities, in which local amateur golfers could play with the professional golfers from the Tour as a benefit for local charities.

== Winners ==
Year	Date	Champion	Country	Score	Purse ($)	Winner's share ($)
2008	Aug 24	Samantha Richdale	Canada	211 (−5)	100,000	14,000
2007	Aug 26	Vikki Laing	Scotland	207 (−9)	100,000	14,000
2006*	Aug 27	Song-Hee Kim	South Korea	206 (−10)	75,000	10,500

* Tournament won in a sudden-death playoff.

== Tournament records ==
Year	Player	Score	Round
2006	Kristy McPherson	64 (-8)	2nd
