= Historic Brownsville Open =

Golf tournament for professional women golfers

The Historic Brownsville Open was a golf tournament for professional women golfers on the Futures Tour, the LPGA's developmental tour. The event was played in 2009 and 2010. It took place at the Rancho Viejo Country Club & Resort in Rancho Viejo, Texas.

The tournament was a 54-hole event, as are most Futures Tour tournaments, and included pre-tournament pro-am opportunities, in which local amateur golfers played with the professional golfers from the Tour as a benefit for local charities. The benefiting charities from the Historic Brownsville Open were Friendship of Women and The First Tee of Brownsville.

== Winners ==
Year	Dates	Champion	Country	Score	Purse ($)	Winner's share ($)
2010	Apr 23–25	Sophie Jang	South Korea	209 (−4)	110,000	15,400
2009	Apr 24–26	Angela Buzminski	Canada	216 (+3)	110,000	15,400

== Tournament record ==
Year	Player	Score	Round
2010	Dewi Claire Schreefel	66 (−5)	3rd
