= 2007 Duramed Futures Tour =

The 2007 Duramed Futures Tour was a series of professional women's golf tournaments held from March through September 2007 in the United States. The Futures Tour is the second-tier women's professional golf tour in the United States and is the "official developmental tour" of the LPGA Tour.

On July 18, 2007, the LPGA announced that it had acquired the Futures Tour effective immediately, "bringing women's professional golf now under one umbrella." Previously the Futures Tour had operated as a licensee of the LPGA.

== Schedule and results ==
The number in parentheses after winners' names shows the player's total number of official money, individual event wins on the Futures Tour including that event.

Dates	Tournament	Location	Winner
Mar 11	Lakeland Duramed Futures Classic	Florida	(United States) Lori Atsedes (7)
Mar 18	Greater Tampa Duramed Futures Classic	Florida	(United States) Liz Janangelo (1)
Apr 15	The Power of a Dream Golf Classic	Texas	(United States) Allison Fouch (1)
Apr 22	Louisiana Pelican Classic	Louisiana	(United States) Janell Howland (1)
Apr 29	Jalapeno Golf Classic	Texas	(United States) Emily Bastel (1)
May 6	El Paso Golf Classic	Texas	(United States) Mo Martin (1)
May 20	Mercedes-Benz of Kansas City Championship	Kansas	(United States) Liz Janangelo (2)
Jun 3	Aurora Health Care Championship	Wisconsin	(Sweden) Sofie Andersson (1)
Jun 10	United States Steel Golf Classic	Indiana	(United States) Allison Fouch (2)
Jun 17	**Michelob Ultra Duramed Futures Players Championship**	Illinois	(United States) Emily Bastel (2)
Jun 24	The Duramed Championship	Ohio	(South Korea) Seo-Jae Lee (1)
Jul 1	Team WLF.org Golf Classic	Illinois	(South Korea) Seo-Jae Lee (2)
Jul 15	CIGNA Golf Classic	Connecticut	(United States) Taylor Leon (1)
Jul 22	Alliance Bank Golf Classic	New York	(Mexico) Violeta Retamoza (1)
Aug 5	USI Championship	New Hampshire	(South Korea) Ji Min Jeong (3)
Aug 12	Betty Puskar Golf Classic	West Virginia	(United States) Taylor Leon (2)
Aug 19	Hunters Oak Golf Classic	Maryland	(United States) Mollie Fankhauser (2)
Aug 26	The Gettysburg Championship	Pennsylvania	(Scotland) Vikki Laing (1)
Sep 9	ILOVENY Championship	New York	(Thailand) Onnarin Sattayabanphot (1)

Tournaments in bold are majors.

== Leading money winners ==
These top five money winners at the end of the 2007 season were awarded fully exempt status on the LPGA Tour for the 2008 season.

Position	Player	Country	Earnings (US$)
1	Emily Bastel	United States	59,779
2	Allison Fouch	United States	54,476
3	Mollie Fankhauser	United States	50,128
4	Violeta Retamoza	Mexico	49,895
5	Seo-Jae Lee	South Korea	48,493

== See also ==
- 2007 in golf
