= Mo Martin =

American professional golfer (born 1982)

Personal information
- Full name: Melissa Linda Martin
- Nickname: Mo
- Nationality: United States
- Born: October 8, 1982 (age 44) Pasadena, California, U.S.
- Height: 5 ft 1 in (1.55 m)

Career
- Sport: Golf
- College: UCLA
- Turned professional: 2005
- Former tours: LPGA Tour (2012–2022); Futures Tour (2006–2011)
- Professional wins: 4

Number of wins by tour
- LPGA Tour: 1
- Ladies European Tour: 1
- Epson Tour: 3

Best results in LPGA major championships
- Chevron Championship: T14: 2016
- Women's PGA C'ship: T17: 2014, 2016
- U.S. Women's Open: T21: 2016
- Women's British Open: Won: 2014
- Evian Championship: T2: 2018

Melissa Linda "Mo" Martin (born October 8, 1982) is an American professional golfer who played on the LPGA Tour. Her sole win on the tour was a major championship, the Women's British Open in 2014.

== College career ==
Martin played college golf all four years at UCLA, walking-on as a freshman. She was the Bruins' Most Valuable Player in 2002, earned UCLA academic honors, and was also a three-time Pac-10 Academic Honorable Mention selection. She graduated in 2005 with a bachelor's degree in psychology.

== Professional career ==
Martin turned professional in 2005, and joined the Futures Tour on January 23, 2006. She played in the 2007 U.S. Women's Open and missed the cut. Martin was the 2010 recipient of the Futures Tour's Heather Wilbur Spirit Award, presented annually to the player who "best exemplifies dedication, courage, perseverance, love of the game and spirit toward achieving goals as a professional golfer." The annual recipient is nominated by her peers on the tour. In 2011, with 11 top-10 finishes and 1 victory, she earned full playing privileges on the LPGA Tour for the 2012 season.

Martin won the Women's British Open in 2014, her first major championship and also her first LPGA Tour title. She led after 36 holes, but a 77 (+5) on Saturday dropped her three strokes back. An eagle at the final hole on Sunday gave her the victory, one stroke ahead of runners-up Shanshan Feng and Suzann Pettersen. It was Martin's first eagle of the 2014 season and the win moved her from 99 to 26 in the women's world rankings. Her previous best finish in a major was a tie for 29th at the 2014 Kraft Nabisco Championship.

== Personal ==
Born in Pasadena, California, Martin attended Chandler School. Her father, Allen Martin, was a defense attorney and taught her to play golf as a child, using Ben Hogan's Five Lessons: The Modern Fundamentals of Golf. Allen died of a heart attack when Mo was in college at age 20, and she then established a relationship with her paternal grandfather, Lincoln Martin, who was over 90 years old. Before Allen's death, Mo and Lincoln had minimal interaction, due to a strained father-son relationship. During her early years as a professional on the Futures Tour, Lincoln was her chief supporter and mentor. He died in March 2014 at age 102, about four months before she won her major title in England.

Her nickname "Mo" was given to her by her father, in reference to the U.S.S. Missouri, a famous battleship of World War II that served the U.S. Navy into the 1990s.

She resides in Naples, Florida.

== Professional wins (4) ==
=== LPGA Tour wins (1) ===
Legend
Major championships (1)
Other LPGA Tour events (0)

No.	Date	Tournament	Winning score	To par	Margin of victory	Runners-up
1	Jul 13, 2014	Ricoh Women's British Open^{[1]}	69-69-77-72=287	−1	1 stroke	(China) Shanshan Feng (Norway) Suzann Pettersen

^{1} Co-sanctioned by the Ladies European Tour.

=== Futures Tour wins (3) ===
No.	Date	Tournament	Winning score	To par	Margin of victory	Runner-up
1	May 6, 2007	El Paso Golf Classic	69-71-67=207	−9	1 stroke	(Sweden) Caroline Larsson
2	Jul 27, 2008	USI Championship	71-66-67=204	−12	4 strokes	(United States) Gerina Mendoza
3	Aug 14, 2011	Eagle Classic	70-67-66=203	−13	3 strokes	(United States) Cara Freeman

== Major championships ==
=== Wins (1) ===
Year	Championship	54 holes	Winning score	Margin	Runners-up
2014	Women's British Open	3 shot deficit	−1 (69-69-77-72=287)	1 stroke	(China) Shanshan Feng, (Norway) Suzann Pettersen

=== Results timeline ===
Results not in chronological order before 2019.

Tournament	2007	2008	2009	2010	2011	2012	2013	2014	2015	2016	2017	2018	2019	2020
Chevron Championship						T70	T66	T29	T51	T14	T63	CUT	T21	
U.S. Women's Open	CUT					CUT	T42	CUT	T35	T21	CUT	CUT		
Women's PGA Championship						T30	T37	T17	T26	T17	CUT	T33		
The Evian Championship ^							T57		CUT	CUT	T26	T2		
Women's British Open						57	CUT	1	CUT	T2	T49	T39		

Tournament	2021	2022
Chevron Championship		
U.S. Women's Open		
Women's PGA Championship	CUT	CUT
The Evian Championship ^		
Women's British Open	CUT	T51

^ The Evian Championship was added as a major in 2013

Win
Top 10
Did not play

CUT = missed the half-way cut
"T" = tied

=== Summary ===
Tournament	Wins	2nd	3rd	Top-5	Top-10	Top-25	Events	Cuts made
Chevron Championship	0	0	0	0	0	2	8	7
U.S. Women's Open	0	0	0	0	0	1	8	3
Women's PGA Championship	0	0	0	0	0	2	9	6
The Evian Championship	0	1	0	1	1	1	5	3
Women's British Open	1	1	0	2	2	2	9	6
Totals	1	2	0	3	3	8	39	25

- Most consecutive cuts made – 4 (three times)
- Longest streak of top-10s – 1 (three times)
