= Team WLF.org Golf Classic =

Women's golf tournament

Team WLF.org Golf Classic was an annual golf tournament for professional women golfers on the Futures Tour, the LPGA Tour's developmental tour. The event was played from 2005 through 2007 at the Kankakee Elks Country Club in the Kankakee, Illinois area.

The title sponsor from 2006 was the World Leadership Foundation (WLF), an international Christian-based training ministry.

The tournament was a 54-hole event, as are most Futures Tour tournaments, and included pre-tournament pro-am opportunities, in which local amateur golfers can play with the professional golfers from the Tour as a benefit for local charities. The benefiting charity from this tournament is the WLF.

Tournament names through the years:

- 2005: Kankakee Futures Golf Classic
- 2006–2007: Team WLF.org Golf Classic

The tournament was last held from June 29 through July 1, 2007.

== Winners ==
Year	Champion	Country	Score	Purse ($)	Winner's share ($)
2007	Seo-Jae Lee	South Korea	208 (−8)	80,000	11,200
2006	Mollie Fankhauser	United States	212 (−4)*	70,000	9,800
2005	Nicole Castrale	United States	209 (−7)	70,000	9,800

* Tournament won in sudden-death playoff.

== Tournament records ==
Year	Player	Score	Round
2005	Nicole Castrale	66 (−6)	2nd
2006	Inbee Park	66 (−6)	2nd
