= Greater Tampa Duramed FUTURES Classic =

The Greater Tampa Duramed Futures Classic was an annual golf tournament for professional women golfers on the Futures Tour, the LPGA Tour's developmental tour. The event was a part of the Futures Tour's schedule from 2003 to 2007. In 2003 it was played at Rogers Park Golf Course. In 2004 and 2005 it was played at East Lake Woodlands Golf & Country Club. In 2006 and 2007 it was played at Summerfield Crossings Golf Club. All four courses are located in the Tampa, Florida area.

The tournament was a 54-hole event, as are most Futures Tour tournaments, and included pre-tournament pro-am opportunities, in which local amateur golfers can play with the professional golfers from the Tour as a benefit for local charities. The benefiting charities from the Greater Tampa Duramed Futures Classic were the American Cancer Society and The Mary and Martha House.

The last tournament was held March 16–18, 2007.

== Winners ==
Year	Champion	Country	Score	Tournament location	Purse ($)	Winner's share ($)
2007	Liz Janangelo	United States	215 (+2)	Summerfield Crossings Golf Club	80,000	11,200
2006	Ashley Prange	United States	203 (−10)	Summerfield Crossings Golf Club	70,000	9,800
2005	Sarah Jane Kenyon	Australia	210 (−6)	East Lake Woodlands Golf Club	65,000	9,100
2004	Jimin Kang	South Korea	208 (−8)	East Lake Woodlands Golf Club	65,000	9,100
2003	Colleen Cashman	United States	209 (−7)	Rogers Park Golf Course	65,000	9,100

== Tournament records ==
Year	Player	Score	Round	Course
2006	Ashley Prange	66 (−5)	3rd	Summerfield Crossings Golf Club
