= Reilley Rankin =

American professional golfer (born 1988)

Personal information
- Full name: Reilley Rankin
- Nationality: United States
- Born: April 17, 1979 (age 47) Beaufort, South Carolina, U.S.
- Height: 5 ft 7 in (1.70 m)

Career
- Sport: Golf
- College: University of Georgia
- Turned professional: 2001
- Former tours: LPGA Tour (joined 2004); LPGA Futures Tour
- Professional wins: 2

Number of wins by tour
- Epson Tour: 2

Best results in LPGA major championships
- Chevron Championship: T9: 2005
- Women's PGA C'ship: T9: 2006
- U.S. Women's Open: T42: 2008
- Women's British Open: 4th: 2007
- Evian Championship: DNP

Achievements and awards
- Heather Farr Player Award: 2013

Reilley Rankin (born April 17, 1979) is an American professional golfer who played on the LPGA Tour.

== Early life and amateur career ==
In 1979, Rankin was born in Beaufort, South Carolina. Rankin was a three-time American Junior Golf Association (AJGA) Rolex All-American from 1995 to 1997.

Rankin was a three-time All-American at the University of Georgia where she was the Southeastern Conference (SEC) Freshman of the Year in 1997, the NCAA Freshman of the Year in 1998, and the 1997–98 SEC Player of the Year. She won four consecutive collegiate tournaments in 1998, the same year she was a semifinalist at the Women's Western Amateur. She was forced to take two years off from competition in 1999 and 2000 after breaking her back but came in 2001 to lead the Georgia to the NCAA Championship title. She graduated from Georgia in 2001 with a degree in Child and Family Development.

== Professional career ==
In July 2001, shortly after graduating from college, Rankin turned professional. She played on the Futures Tour. She played two tournaments on the Futures Tour in 2001 and then played full seasons in 2002 and 2003. In 2003, she won two events which earned fifth place on the Futures Tour money list and full membership on the LPGA Tour for the 2004 season.

Her best finish on the LPGA Tour is a tie for second at the 2007 Mizuno Classic. In 2010, she fell to 139th on the final official LPGA money list, requiring her to return to LPGA qualifying school in order to retain her LPGA playing privileges for 2011. She finished in the top 10 at the qualifying tournament.

== Personal life ==
On June 4, 1998, during the summer between her sophomore and junior years at the University of Georgia, Rankin was severely injured after jumping from a cliff into a lake about 70 feet below. Her injuries included a broken back, a broken sternum and bruised heart, lungs and aorta. She was confined to a body cast for three months.

== Awards and honors ==
In 2013, she earned the Heather Farr Player Award, given to a golfer who has demonstrated perseverance

== Professional wins (2) ==
=== Futures Tour wins (2) ===
No.	Date	Tournament	Winning score	Margin of victory	Runner-up
1	May 24, 2003	Northwest Indiana Futures Golf Classic	−5 (x-x-70=211)	Playoff	(South Korea) Soo Young Moon
2	Aug 21, 2003	Betty Puskar Futures Golf Classic	−10 (67-67=134)	2 strokes	(United States) Lisa Strom
