= Bright House Networks Open =

Golf tournament

The Bright House Networks Open was an annual golf tournament for professional women golfers on the Futures Tour, the LPGA Tour's developmental tour. The event was part of the Futures Tour's schedule from 1998 through 2008. From 1998 through 2003, it was played at The Club at Eaglebrooke. From 2004 to 2008, it was played at Cleveland Heights Golf Course. Both courses are located in Lakeland, Florida.

The most recent title sponsor was Bright House Networks, a cable television and digital services provider with headquarters in Syracuse, New York.

The tournament was a 54-hole event, as are most Futures Tour tournaments, and included pre-tournament pro-am opportunities, in which local amateur golfers could play with the professional golfers from the Tour as a benefit for local charities. Charities benefiting from the Bright House Networks Open included The First Tee of Lakeland.

Tournament names through the years:

- 2002–2003: Florida Futures Golf Challenge
- 2004–2007: Lakeland Duramed Futures Classic
- 2008: Bright House Networks Open

== Winners ==
Year	Dates	Champion	Country	Score	Venue	Purse ($)	Winner's share ($)
2008*	Mar 14–16	Sunny Oh	South Korea	211 (−5)	Cleveland Heights Golf Course	85,000	11,900
2007	Mar 9–11	Lori Atsedes	United States	212 (−4)	Cleveland Heights Golf Course	80,000	11,200
2006	Mar 10–12	Meaghan Francella	United States	209 (−7)	Cleveland Heights Golf Course	70,000	9,800
2005	Mar 11–13	Jin Young Pak	South Korea	211 (−5)	Cleveland Heights Golf Course	65,000	9,100
2004	Mar 12–14	Kimberly Adams	Canada	205 (−11)	Cleveland Heights Golf Course	65,000	9,100
2003	Mar 13–16	Soo Young Moon	South Korea	206 (−10)	The Club at Eaglebrooke	60,000	8,400
2002	Mar 22–24	Sue Ginter-Brooker	United States	212 (−4)	The Club at Eaglebrooke	60,000	8,400

*Tournament won in sudden-death playoff.

== Tournament records ==
Year	Player	Score	Round	Course
2004	Cortney Reno	65 (−7)	2nd	Cleveland Heights Golf Course
