= Charlotte Mayorkas =

American professional golfer and golf instructor (born 1983)

Personal information
- Nationality: United States
- Born: September 11, 1983 (age 43) San Diego, California, U.S.
- Height: 5 ft 6 in (168 cm)

Career
- Sport: Golf
- College: UCLA
- Turned professional: 2005
- Former tours: LPGA Tour; Futures Tour
- Professional wins: 2

Number of wins by tour
- Epson Tour: 2

Best results in LPGA major championships
- Women's PGA C'ship: T56: 2007
- U.S. Women's Open: T35: 2007
- Women's British Open: CUT: 2007

Achievements and awards
- Pac-10 Golfer of the Year: 2004
- WGCA Coaches and Players Hall of Fame: 2023

Charlotte Mayorkas (born September 11, 1983) is an American professional golfer and golf instructor. She is known for how she started at University of California, Los Angeles (UCLA), where she earned multiple All-American honors, and for her professional career, which included participation on the LPGA Tour.

== Early life and education ==
Mayorkas was born in San Diego, California. She developed an early interest in sports. She played tennis before transitioning to golf at the age of 10. She attended Hilltop High School and was the top player on her school's varsity golf team. Her success led her to the University of California, Los Angeles (UCLA), where she had a stellar collegiate career, winning multiple tournaments and leading the team to an NCAA Championship victory in 2004.

== Professional career ==
Mayorkas turned professional in 2005, beginning her career on the Duramed Futures Tour. Her career on the LPGA Tour spanned several years, during which she made 54 cuts out of 67 tournaments played.

She also competed in the Women's British Open. Later in her career, she would be induction into the Women's Golf Coaches Association (WAGCA) Hall of Fame.

== Later career and coaching ==
After her playing career, Mayorkas transitioned to coaching and now serves as a golf instructor at Haggin Oaks Golf Complex in Sacramento, California. There, she focuses on helping both amateur and professional golfers improve their skills. As of recently, she became the head golf coach at St. Francis High School on July 24, 2023.

== Personal life ==
Mayorkas is married to Mike Duhamel, a fellow golf instructor at Haggin Oaks.

== Professional wins (2) ==
=== Duramed Futures Tour wins (2) ===
- 2006 Tucson Duramed Futures Golf Classic, Laconia Savings Bank Golf Classic
