= City of Hammond Classic =

American women's golf tournament

The City of Hammond Classic was an annual golf tournament for professional women golfers on the Futures Tour, the LPGA Tour's developmental tour. The event was played each year between 2003 and 2010 in the Hammond, Indiana area.

The presenting sponsor was Horseshoe Casino, a casino located in Hammond.

The tournament was a 54-hole event, as are most Futures Tour tournaments, and included pre-tournament pro-am opportunities, in which local amateur golfers can play with the professional golfers from the Tour as a benefit for local charities. The last benefiting charity from the City of Hammond Classic was the Lake Area United Way.

Tournament names through the years:

- 2003–2004: The New Innsbrook Country Club Futures Golf Classic presented by Horseshoe Casino
- 2005: Northwest Indiana Futures Golf Classic
- 2006: Horseshoe Casino Futures Golf Classic
- 2007: United States Steel Golf Classic
- 2008–2009: Horseshoe Casino Classic at Lost Marsh Golf Course
- 2010: City of Hammond Classic presented by Horseshoe Casino Hammond

== Winners ==
Year	Dates	Champion	Country	Score	Tournament location	Purse ($)	Winner's share ($)
2010	Jun 25–27	Nannette Hill	United States	209 (−7)	Lost Marsh Golf Course	110,000	15,400
2009	Jun 26–28	Jean Reynolds	United States	213 (−3)	Lost Marsh Golf Course	100,000	14,000
2008	Jun 27–29	Vicky Hurst	United States	213 (−3)	Lost Marsh Golf Course	90,000	12,600
2007	Jun 8–10	Allison Fouch	United States	214 (−2)	Lost Marsh Golf Course	75,000	10,500
2006	Jun 30 – Jul 2	Ashley Prange	United States	214 (−2)	Lost Marsh Golf Course	75,000	10,500
2005*	Jun 3–5	Nicole Castrale	United States	209 (−8)	The New Innsbrook Country Club	70,000	9,800
2004	May 26–29	Naree Song	South Korea	208 (−2)	The New Innsbrook Country Club	70,000	9,800
2003*	May 22–24	Reilley Rankin	United States	211 (−5)	Innsbrook Country Club	65,000	9,100

* Championship won in sudden-death playoff.

== Tournament records ==
Year	Player	Score		Course
2004	Aram Cho	66 (−6)	3rd	The New Innsbrook Country Club
2004	Naree Song	66 (−6)	3rd	The New Innsbrook Country Club
2005	Nicole Castrale	66 (−6)	2nd	The New Innsbrook Country Club
2005	Allison Hanna	66 (−6)	3rd	The New Innsbrook Country Club
2010	Jenny Shin	64 (−8)	2nd	Lost Marsh Golf Course
