= 2008 Duramed Futures Tour =

Women's golf tour season

The 2008 Duramed Futures Tour was a series of professional women's golf tournaments held from March through October 2008 in the United States. The Futures Tour is the second-tier women's professional golf tour in the United States and is the "official developmental tour" of the LPGA Tour.

== Leading money winners ==
The top ten money winners at the end of the season gained membership on the LPGA Tour for the 2009 season, with those finishing in the top five positions gaining higher priority for entry into events than those finishing in positions six through ten. Finishers in positions six through ten had the option to attend LPGA Qualifying School to try to improve their membership status for 2009.

| Position | Player | Country | Earnings (US$) |
|---|---|---|---|
| 1 | Vicky Hurst | United States | 93,107 |
| 2 | Mindy Kim | United States | 79,270 |
| 3 | Sarah Jane Kenyon | Australia | 48,637 |
| 4 | M. J. Hur | South Korea | 45,137 |
| 5 | Jin Young Pak | South Korea | 42,368 |
| 6 | Song Yi Choi | South Korea | 38,349 |
| 7 | Jessica Shepley | Canada | 37,705 |
| 8 | Leah Wigger | United States | 36,719 |
| 9 | Sophia Sheridan | Mexico | 34,397 |
| 10 | Kim Welch | United States | 33,768 |

== Schedule and results ==
The number in parentheses after winners' names show the player's total number of official money, individual event wins on the Futures Tour including that event.

| Dates | Tournament | Location | Winner |
|---|---|---|---|
| Mar 16 | Bright House Networks Open | Florida | (South Korea) Sunny Oh (1) |
| Apr 6 | American Systems Invitational | Florida | (United States) Leah Wigger (1) |
| Apr 20 | Louisiana Pelican Classic | Louisiana | (South Korea) M. J. Hur (1) |
| Apr 27 | Jalapeno Golf Classic | Texas | (United States) Vicky Hurst (1) |
| May 4 | El Paso Golf Classic | Texas | (Sweden) Kristina Tucker (1) |
| May 18 | Mercedes-Benz of Kansas City Championship | Kansas | (South Korea) Mindy Kim (1) |
| Jun 1 | Aurora Health Care Championship | Wisconsin | (South Korea) Mindy Kim (2) |
| Jun 15 | **Michelob Ultra Duramed Futures Players Championship** | Illinois | (United States) Vicky Hurst (2) |
| Jun 22 | The Duramed Championship | Ohio | (United States) Stephanie Otteson (1) |
| Jun 29 | Horseshoe Casino Classic at Lost Marsh Golf Course | Indiana | (United States) Vicky Hurst (3) |
| Jul 13 | CIGNA Golf Classic | Connecticut | (United States) Vicky Hurst (4) |
| Jul 20 | Alliance Bank Golf Classic | New York | (United States) Kim Welch (1) |
| Jul 27 | USI Championship | New Hampshire | (United States) Mo Martin (2) |
| Aug 10 | Falls Auto Group Classic | Kentucky | (South Korea) Mindy Kim (3) |
| Aug 17 | Greater Richmond Duramed Futures Classic | Virginia | (South Korea) Haeji Kang (1) |
| Aug 24 | The Gettysburg Championship | Pennsylvania | (Canada) Samantha Richdale (1) |
| Sep 7 | ILOVENY Championship | New York | (Australia) Sarah Jane Kenyon (2) |
| Oct 19 | Duramed Invitational | Georgia | (United States) Vicky Hurst (5) |

Tournaments in bold are majors

== See also ==
- 2008 in golf
