= 2006 Duramed Futures Tour =

The 2006 Duramed Futures Tour was a series of professional women's golf tournaments held from March through September 2006 in the United States. The Futures Tour is the second-tier women's professional golf tour in the United States and is the "official developmental tour" of the LPGA Tour.

The age minimum age for participation was lowered to 17 for the 2006 season.

== Schedule and results ==
The number in parentheses after winners' names shows the player's total number of official money, individual event wins on the Futures Tour including that event.

Dates	Tournament	Location	Winner
Mar 12	Lakeland Duramed Futures Classic	Florida	(United States) Meaghan Francella (1)
Mar 19	Greater Tampa Duramed Futures Classic	Florida	(United States) Ashley Prange (1)
Apr 9	Louisiana Pelican Classic	Louisiana	(South Korea) Song-Hee Kim (1)
Apr 23	The Power of a Dream Golf Classic	Texas	(South Korea) Hye Jung Choi (1)
Apr 30	Jalapeno Golf Classic	Texas	(United States) Kristy McPherson (1)
May 7	IOS Golf Classic	Texas	(South Korea) Song-Hee Kim (2)
May 14	Tucson Duramed Futures Golf Classic	Arizona	(United States) Charlotte Mayorkas (1)
Jun 4	Aurora Health Care Championship	Wisconsin	(South Korea) Song-Hee Kim (3)
Jun 11	Team WLF.org Golf Classic	Illinois	(United States) Mollie Fankhauser (1)
Jun 18	**Michelob Ultra Duramed Futures Players Championship**	Illinois	(Canada) Salimah Mussani (1)
Jun 25	Lima Memorial Hospital Futures Classic	Ohio	(South Korea) Ji Min Jeong (1)
Jul 2	Northwest Indiana Futures Golf Classic	Indiana	(United States) Ashley Prange (2)
Jul 16	CIGNA Golf Classic	Connecticut	(South Korea) Song-Hee Kim (4)
Jul 23	Alliance Bank Golf Classic	New York	(South Korea) Ha-Na Chae (1)
Aug 6	Laconia Savings Bank Golf Classic	New Hampshire	(United States) Charlotte Mayorkas (2)
Aug 13	Betty Puskar Golf Classic	West Virginia	(United States) Kristy McPherson (2)
Aug 20	Hunters Oak Golf Classic	Maryland	(United States) Ashley Hoagland (1)
Aug 27	The Gettysburg Championship	Pennsylvania	(South Korea) Song-Hee Kim (5)
Sep 10	ILOVENY Championship	New York	(South Korea) Ji Min Jeong (2)

Tournaments in bold are majors.

== Leading money winners ==
These top five money winners at the end of the 2006 season were awarded fully exempt status on the LPGA Tour for the 2007 season.

Position	Player	Country	Earnings (US$)
1	Song-Hee Kim	South Korea	76,287
2	Charlotte Mayorkas	United States	66,351
3	Inbee Park	South Korea	49,079
4	Kristy McPherson	United States	40,558
5	Meaghan Francella	United States	39,416

== Major tournament ==
In 2006, the Futures Tour held its first major tournament. The Michelob Ultra Futures Players Championship in Decatur, Illinois, which has been on the Tour's schedule since 1985, was the Tour's first 72-hole event, and carried the Tour's largest purse ever — $100,000. The winner, Salimah Mussani, received a sponsor's exemption to play in the LPGA's State Farm Classic in September, 2006. Mussani, a native of Canada, also played in the CN Canadian Women's Open, an August 2006 event on the LPGA Tour.

== 2006 traffic death ==
On June 18, 2006, while driving from a tournament in Decatur, Illinois to the next tournament in Lima, Ohio, Futures Tour player Gaelle Truet was killed in a car accident at age 27. She was the first Tour player to perish in a traffic incident in the 26 years of the Futures Tour and the 50 years of the LPGA Tour.
