= Brittany Johnston =

American professional golfer

Personal information
- Full name: Brittany Graham Johnston
- Nationality: United States
- Born: January 6, 1986 (age 40) Cleveland, Ohio, U.S.

Career
- Sport: Golf
- College: Northwestern University
- Turned professional: 2008
- Former tour: Futures Tour
- Professional wins: 1

Number of wins by tour
- Epson Tour: 1

Best results in LPGA major championships
- Chevron Championship: DNP
- Women's PGA C'ship: DNP
- U.S. Women's Open: CUT: 2011
- Women's British Open: DNP

Brittany Johnston (born January 6, 1986) is an American female professional golfer who played on the Futures Tour.

== Personal ==
Johnston was born in Cleveland, Ohio, on January 6, 1986, to Rod and Sandy Johnston. Her father is a PGA Master Golf Professional. She resides in Akron, Ohio.

== College ==
Johnston played college golf for four years at Northwestern University. She chose to go to Northwestern over Princeton, Bradley, and Penn State. She graduated with a bachelor's degree in political science.

== Professional ==
Johnston turned professional in 2008, and joined the Futures Tour on January 15, 2008. She qualified for the 2011 U.S. Women's Open, but failed to make the cut with scores of 81 and 80.

== Professional wins (1) ==
=== Futures Tour wins (1) ===
No.	Date	Tournament	Winning score	Margin of victory	Runner-up
1	July 17, 2011	ING New England Golf Classic	−11 (70-64-65=199)	1 stroke	(Republic of Ireland) Alison Walshe
