= Northeast Delta Dental International =

Golf tournament

The Northeast Delta Dental International was an annual golf tournament for professional women golfers on the Symetra Tour, the LPGA's developmental tour. The event was played from 2004 to 2013 in the Concord, New Hampshire area. Naming rights were purchased by insurer Northeast Delta Dental.

Tournament names through the years:

- 2004–06: Laconia Savings Bank Golf Classic
- 2007–09: USI Championship
- 2010–11: The International at Concord
- 2012–13: Northeast Delta Dental International

== Winners ==
Year	Dates	Champion	Country	Score	Tournament location	Purse ($)	Winner's share ($)
2013	Jul 19–21	P.K. Kongkraphan	Thailand	207 (−9)	Beaver Meadow Golf Course	100,000	15,000
2012	Jul 20–22	Jenny Gleason	United States	211 (−5)	Beaver Meadow Golf Course	100,000	15,000
2011	Jul 22–24	Jessica Shepley	Canada	203 (−13)	Beaver Meadow Golf Course	100,000	14,000
2010	Jul 19–25	Jenny Shin	South Korea	205 (−11)	Beaver Meadow Golf Course	110,000	15,400
2009	Jul 24–26	Misun Cho	South Korea	207 (−9)	Beaver Meadow Golf Course	90,000	12,600
2008	Jul 25–27	Mo Martin	United States	204 (−12)	Beaver Meadow Golf Course	80,000	11,200
2007	Aug 3–5	Ji Min Jeong	South Korea	209 (−7)	Beaver Meadow Golf Course	75,000	10,500
2006	Aug 4–6	Charlotte Mayorkas	United States	207 (−9)	Beaver Meadow Golf Course	70,000	9,800
2005	Jul 22–24	Kyeong Bae	South Korea	209 (−7)	Beaver Meadow Golf Course	65,000	9,100
2004	Jul 16–18	Erica Blasberg	United States	201 (−15)	Canterbury Woods Country Club	65,000	9,100

== Tournament records ==
Year	Player	Score	Round	Course
2004	Erica Blasberg	62 (−10)	2nd	Canterbury Woods Country Club
