= Hunters Oak Golf Classic =

US professional women's golf tournament

The Hunters Oak Golf Classic was a golf tournament for professional women golfers on the Futures Tour, the LPGA Tour's developmental tour. The event was part of the Futures Tour's schedule from 2003 to 2007 and was held at Hunters Oak Golf Club in Queenstown, Maryland.

The tournament was a 54-hole event, as are most Futures Tour tournaments, and included pre-tournament pro-am opportunities, in which local communities members could play with the professional golfers from the Tour. Benefiting charities from the Hunters Oak Golf Classic included the Chesapeake Bay Environmental Center.

== Winners ==
Year	Champion	Country
2007	Mollie Fankhauser	United States
2006	Ashley Hoagland	United States
2005	Stephanie George	United States
2004	Smitri Mehra	India
2003	Candy Hanneman	Brazil
