= The Power of a Dream Golf Classic =

The Power of a Dream Golf Classic was a golf tournament for professional women golfers on the Futures Tour, the LPGA Tour's developmental tour. The event was part of the Futures Tour's schedule in 2006 and 2007. It took place at The Trails of Frisco Golf Club in Frisco, Texas.

The tournament was a 54-hole event, as are most Futures Tour tournaments, and included pre-tournament pro-am opportunities, in which local amateur golfers can play with the professional golfers from the Tour as a benefit for local charities. The benefiting charities from The Power of a Dream Golf Classic were HomeAid/Homebuilders Care and Camp Fire USA Lone Star Council.

== Winners ==
Year	Dates	Champion	Country	Score	Purse ($)	Winner's share ($)
2007	Apr 13–15	Allison Fouch	United States	212 (−1)	80,000	11,200
2006	Apr 21–23	Hye Jung Choi	South Korea	203 (−10)	75,000	10,500

== Tournament records ==
Year	Player	Score	Round
2006	Danielle Downey	66 (−5)	1st
