= ING New England Golf Classic =

Annual tournament for women golfers

The ING New England Golf Classic was an annual golf tournament for professional women golfers on the Futures Tour, the LPGA Tour's developmental tour. The event was played from 1999 to 2011 in the Hartford, Connecticut area.

Prior to 2009, the tournament had various title sponsors, most recently CIGNA, a health service company based in Philadelphia, Pennsylvania. The 2009 season opened with the tournament lacking a title sponsor. In mid-June 2009 it was announced that ING, a global financial institution, would become the new title sponsor.

The tournament was a 54-hole event, as are most Futures Tour tournaments, and includes pre-tournament pro-am opportunities, in which local amateur golfers can play with the professional golfers from the Tour as a benefit for local charities. The benefiting charity from the New England Golf Classic was Chip in for a Cure, a Connecticut-based breast cancer charity.

Tournament names through the years:

- 1999: SNET Women's Classic
- 2000: Connecticut Futures Golf Classic
- 2001–2003: Lincoln Financial Futures Golf Classic
- 2004: GMAC Futures Golf Classic
- 2005–2008: CIGNA Golf Classic
- 2009–2011: ING New England Golf Classic

== Winners ==
Year	Champion	Country	Score	Tournament location	Purse ($)	Winner's share ($)
1999	Riko Higashio	Japan	206 (−7)	Blue Fox Run Golf Course	50,000	6,600
2000^*	Christel Tomori	United States	140 (−2)	Blue Fox Run Golf Course	50,000	7,000
2001*	Kathryn Cusick	United States	212 (−1)	Blue Fox Run Golf Course	60,000	8,400
2002	Linda Ishii	Japan	208 (−5)	Blue Fox Run Golf Course	60,000	8,400
2003	Stacy Prammanasudh	United States	203 (−10)	Blue Fox Run Golf Course	60,000	8,400
2004	Nicole Perrot	Chile	209 (−4)	Blue Fox Run Golf Course	70,000	9,800
2005^	Virada Nirapathpongporn	Thailand	142 (−2)	Gillette Ridge Golf Club	70,000	9,800
2006	Song-Hee Kim	South Korea	216 (E)	Gillette Ridge Golf Club	70,000	9,800
2007*	Taylor Leon	United States	215 (−1)	Gillette Ridge Golf Club	80,000	11,200
2008	Vicky Hurst	United States	209 (−7)	Gillette Ridge Golf Club	80,000	11,200
2009	Dewi Claire Schreefel	Netherlands	202 (−8)	Wintonbury Hills Golf Course	100,000	14,000
2010	Tiffany Joh	United States	200 (−10)	Wintonbury Hills Golf Course	100,000	14,000
2011	Brittany Johnston	United States	199 (−11)	Wintonbury Hills Golf Course	100,000	14,000

^ Tournament shortened to 36 holes because of rain.
* Championship won in sudden-death playoff.

== Tournament records ==
Year	Player	Score	Round	Course
2002	Nicole Materne	65 (−6)	1st	Blue Fox Run Golf Course
2002	Michele Vinieratos	65 (−6)	2nd	Blue Fox Run Golf Course
2007	Mollie Fankhauswer	67 (−5)	1st	Gillette Ridge Golf Club
2009	Song Yi Choi	64 (−6)	1st	Wintonbury Hills Golf Course
