= El Paso Golf Classic =

American golf tournament

The El Paso Golf Classic was an annual golf tournament for professional women golfers on the Futures Tour, the LPGA's developmental tour. The event was a part of the Futures Tour's schedule from 2002 through 2008. It took place at the Underwood Golf Complex in El Paso, Texas.

The tournament was a 54-hole event, as are most Futures Tour tournaments, and included a pre-tournament pro-am event, in which local amateur golfers can play with the professional golfers from the Tour as a benefit for local charities. The benefiting charity for the El Paso Golf Classic was the Rotary Club of West El Paso Foundation.

From 2003 through 2006 the tournament was known as the IOS Golf Classic, with the name sponsorship held by International Outsourcing Services, or IOS, an El Paso–based data services company and the largest coupon clearinghouse for grocery store retailers' and manufacturers' coupons in the United States. On March 8, 2007, 11 persons associated with IOS, including its president and chief operating officer, were indicted on wire-fraud charges and with carrying out a scheme to defraud manufacturers that use coupons to market their products to consumers. Shortly thereafter, the Futures Tour and the El Paso tournament withdrew the name of IOS as a sponsor for the tournament and the event was renamed the El Paso Golf Classic.

Tournament names through the years:

- 2002: El Paso Futures Golf Classic
- 2003–06: IOS Golf Classic
- 2007–08: El Paso Golf Classic

== Winners ==
Year	Date	Champion	Country	Score	Purse ($)	Winner's share ($)
2008	May 2–4	Kristina Tucker	Sweden	205 (−11)	85,000	11,900
2007	May 4–6	Mo Martin	United States	207 (−9)	80,000	11,200
2006	May 5–7	Song-Hee Kim	South Korea	208 (−8)	75,000	10,500
2005	Apr 29 – May 1	Kyeong Bae	South Korea	211 (−5)	70,000	9,800
2004	Apr 30 – May 2	Hong Mei Yang	China	205 (−11)	70,000	9,800
2003	May 2–4	Vicki Fergon	United States	216 (E)	70,000	9,800
2002	Apr 12–14	Joellyn Erdmann	United States	204 (−12)	70,000	9,800

== Tournament records ==
Year	Player	Score	Round
2002	Michelle Fuller	64 (−8)	1st
