= Falls Auto Group Classic =

Golf tournament

The Falls Auto Group Classic was an annual golf tournament for professional women golfers on the Futures Tour, the LPGA Tour's developmental tour. The event was played from 2008 to 2010 in the London, Kentucky area.

The tournament was a 54-hole event, as are most Futures Tour events.

== Winners ==
Year	Date	Champion	Country	Score	Purse ($)	Winner's share ($)
2010	Jul 4	Ryann O'Toole	United States	202 (−14)	150,000	16,100
2009	Aug 9	Mina Harigae	United States	205 (−11)	100,000	12,500
2008	Aug 10	Mindy Kim	United States	206 (−10)	100,000	14,000

== Tournament records ==
Year	Player	Score	Round
2008	Stacy Lewis	64 (−8)	2nd
2009	Samantha Richdale	64 (−8)	3rd
