= Jessica Shepley =

Canadian professional golfer

Personal information
- Full name: Jessica Ashley Shepley
- Nationality: Canada
- Born: April 4, 1983 (age 43) Owen Sound, Ontario, Canada
- Height: 5 ft 9 in (1.75 m)

Career
- Sport: Golf
- College: University of Tennessee (graduated 2005)
- Turned professional: 2005
- Current tours: Symetra Tour (joined 2005); CN Canadian Women's Tour (joined 2006)
- Former tour: LPGA Tour (2009–13)
- Professional wins: 1

Number of wins by tour
- Epson Tour: 1

Best results in LPGA major championships
- Chevron Championship: DNP
- Women's PGA C'ship: CUT: 2011, 2012
- U.S. Women's Open: CUT: 2013
- Women's British Open: DNP
- Evian Championship: DNP

Jessica Ashley Shepley (born April 4, 1983) is a Canadian female professional golfer. She is currently playing on the Symetra Tour and on the LPGA Tour.

== Early life and amateur career ==
Shepley was born in Owen Sound, Ontario on April 4, 1983.

Shepley played college golf for four years at the University of Tennessee. She graduated with a bachelor's degree in journalism.

== Professional career ==
In 2005, Shepley turned professional. She joined the Futures Tour on January 28, 2005. In 2006, she played on both the Futures Tour and on the CN Canadian Women's Tour. She finished seventh on the Futures Tour money list in 2008 which earned her limited status on the LPGA Tour in 2009.

== Personal life ==
Shepley resides in Oakville, Ontario.

== Professional wins (1) ==
=== Futures Tour wins (1) ===
No.	Date	Tournament	Winning score	Margin of victory	Runner-up
1	Jul 24, 2011	The International at Concord	−13 (67-70-66=203)	1 stroke	(United States) Lauren Doughtie
