= Liz Janangelo =

American professional golfer (born 1983)

Personal information
- Full name: Elizabeth Janangelo
- Nationality: United States
- Born: October 12, 1983 (age 43) West Hartford, Connecticut, U.S.
- Height: 5 ft 6 in (1.68 m)

Career
- Sport: Golf
- College: Duke University
- Turned professional: 2006
- Former tours: LPGA Tour; Futures Tour
- Professional wins: 6

Number of wins by tour
- Epson Tour: 2
- Other: 4

Best results in LPGA major championships
- Chevron Championship: DNP
- Women's PGA C'ship: CUT: 2008, 2010
- U.S. Women's Open: T30: 2003
- Women's British Open: DNP

Elizabeth Janangelo (born October 12, 1983) is an American professional golfer currently playing on the Futures Tour.

== Early life and amateur career ==
Born and raised in West Hartford, Connecticut, Janangelo began playing golf at age two. At age 13 she won the Connecticut State Women's Amateur Golf Championship, the youngest champion in state history. She went on to win that Championship four more times. She also won the Connecticut State Women's Open four straight years as an amateur (2003–2006).

As a junior golfer, Janangelo won eight American Junior Golf Association (AJGA) titles, including two major titles. She enrolled at Duke University on a golf scholarship in the fall of 2002 and immediately found success. She was named ACC Rookie of the Year and All-ACC in her first year. In her second year, Janangelo won four tournaments, broke the Duke scoring average record, was named NGCA National Player of the Year, won the Golfstat Cup, and was named ACC Player of the Year. She ended her college career with seven career wins.

While still an amateur, Janangelo qualified to play in the U.S. Women's Open four times, beginning as a 16-year-old in 2000. She has finished as high as tied for 30th.

Janangelo was a former golfer at Wampanoag Country Club.

== Professional career ==
After graduating from Duke in May 2006, Janangelo was immediately eligible to play on the Futures Tour based on her high ranking in the 2006 Golfweek Collegiate rankings. She played in seven events in the remainder of the 2006 season, making the cut in six. In the fall of 2006, she attended LPGA Tour qualifying school where she failed to qualify and returned to the Futures Tour for 2007. She won her first tournament in the second event of the Futures Tour 2007 season, the Greater Tampa Duramed FUTURES Classic.

In 2007, Janangelo earned $45,084 and finished sixth on the Futures Tour money list, one spot out of automatic qualifying for fully exempt status for 2008 on the LPGA Tour.

In December 2007 she qualified for the LGPA Tour for the 2008 season by finishing among the top 17 players in the final LPGA Qualifying tournament.

She finished 147th on the official LPGA money list in 2008 forcing her to return to the LPGA qualifying tournament in order to retain her Tour card for 2009. At the Final Qualifying Tournament in December 2008, Janangelo finished tied for 60th place, not enough to retain LPGA membership for 2009. As a result, she returned to the Futures Tour.

In 2009, she played as a full-time player on the Duramed Futures Tour and finished in 18th place on the money list. This gave her an automatic bid to the Final Round of the LPGA Qualifying tournament, where she regained her LPGA Tour card for the 2010 season.

== Amateur wins ==
- 1997 Connecticut State Women's Amateur
- 1998 Connecticut State Women's Amateur
- 1999 Connecticut State Women's Amateur
- 2000 Connecticut State Women's Amateur
- 2001 Connecticut State Women's Amateur
- 2002–03 Tar Heel Invitational, Liz Murphey Classic
- 2003–04 Tar Heel Invitational (tie), Stanford/Pepsi Intercollegiate (tie), ACC/SEC Challenge, Bryan National Collegiate
- 2005–06 Stanford Pepsi Intercollegiate

== Professional wins (6) ==
=== Futures Tour (2) ===
- 2007 Greater Tampa Duramed FUTURES Classic, Mercedes-Benz of Kansas City Championship

=== Other wins (4) ===
- 2003 Connecticut State Women's Open (as an amateur)
- 2004 Connecticut State Women's Open (as an amateur)
- 2005 Connecticut State Women's Open (as an amateur)
- 2006 Connecticut State Women's Open (as an amateur)

== Results in LPGA majors ==
Tournament	2000	2001	2002	2003	2004	2005	2006	2007	2008	2009	2010
LPGA Championship									CUT		CUT
U.S. Women's Open	CUT		CUT	T30			CUT				WD

Note: Janangelo only played the LPGA Championship and the U.S. Women's Open.

Did not play

CUT = missed the half-way cut
WD = withdrew
"T" = tied

== Team appearances ==
Amateur

- Curtis Cup (representing the United States): 2004 (winners)
