= Betty Puskar Golf Classic =

Annual golf tournament

The Betty Pusker Golf Classic was an annual golf tournament for professional women golfers on the Futures Tour, the LPGA Tour's developmental tour. The event was part of the Futures Tour's schedule from 1992 through 2007. It took place at The Pines Country Club in Morgantown, West Virginia.

The tournament was a 54-hole event, as are most Futures Tour tournaments, and included pre-tournament pro-am opportunities, in which local amateur golfers can play with the professional golfers from the Tour as a benefit for local charities. The benefiting charity for the Betty Pusker Golf Classic was the Betty Puskar Breast Care Center.

The tournament was last held August 10–12, 2007.

== Winners ==
Year	Champion	Country	Score	Purse ($)	Winner's share ($)
2007	Taylor Leon	United States	203 (−13)	80,000	11,200
2006	Kristy McPherson	United States	207 (−9)	75,000	10,500
2005	Sun Young Yoo	South Korea	204 (−12)	70,000	9,800
2004	Jimin Kang	South Korea	209 (−8)	70,000	9,800
2003*	Reilley Rankin	United States	134 (−10)	70,000	9,800
2002	Lorena Ochoa	Mexico	207 (−9)	70,000	9,800
2001	Jenn Brody	United States	202 (−14)	75,000	10,500
2000	Heather Zakhar	United States	206 (−10)	75,000	10,500
1999	Grace Park	South Korea	200 (−16)	75,000	10,500
1998	A.J. Eathorne	Canada	206 (−10)	70,000	9,700
1997**	Becky Iverson	United States	282 (−6)	70,000	9,700
1996	Erika Wicoff	United States	212 (−4)	65,000	9,750
1995	Patty Ehrhart	United States	210 (−6)	65,000	9,750
1994	Tina Paternostro	United States	214 (−2)	50,000	6,800
1993	Missy Tuck	United States	216 (E)	50,000	6,800
1992	Chela Quintana	Venezuela	220 (+4)	20,000	2,600

*Tournament shortened to 36 holes because of rain.
**Tournament was 72 holes.

== Tournament records ==
Year	Player	Score	Round
1999	Grace Park	64 (−8)	2nd
1999	Audra Burks	64 (−8)	2nd
