= Kang Ji-min =

South Korean professional golfer (born 1980)

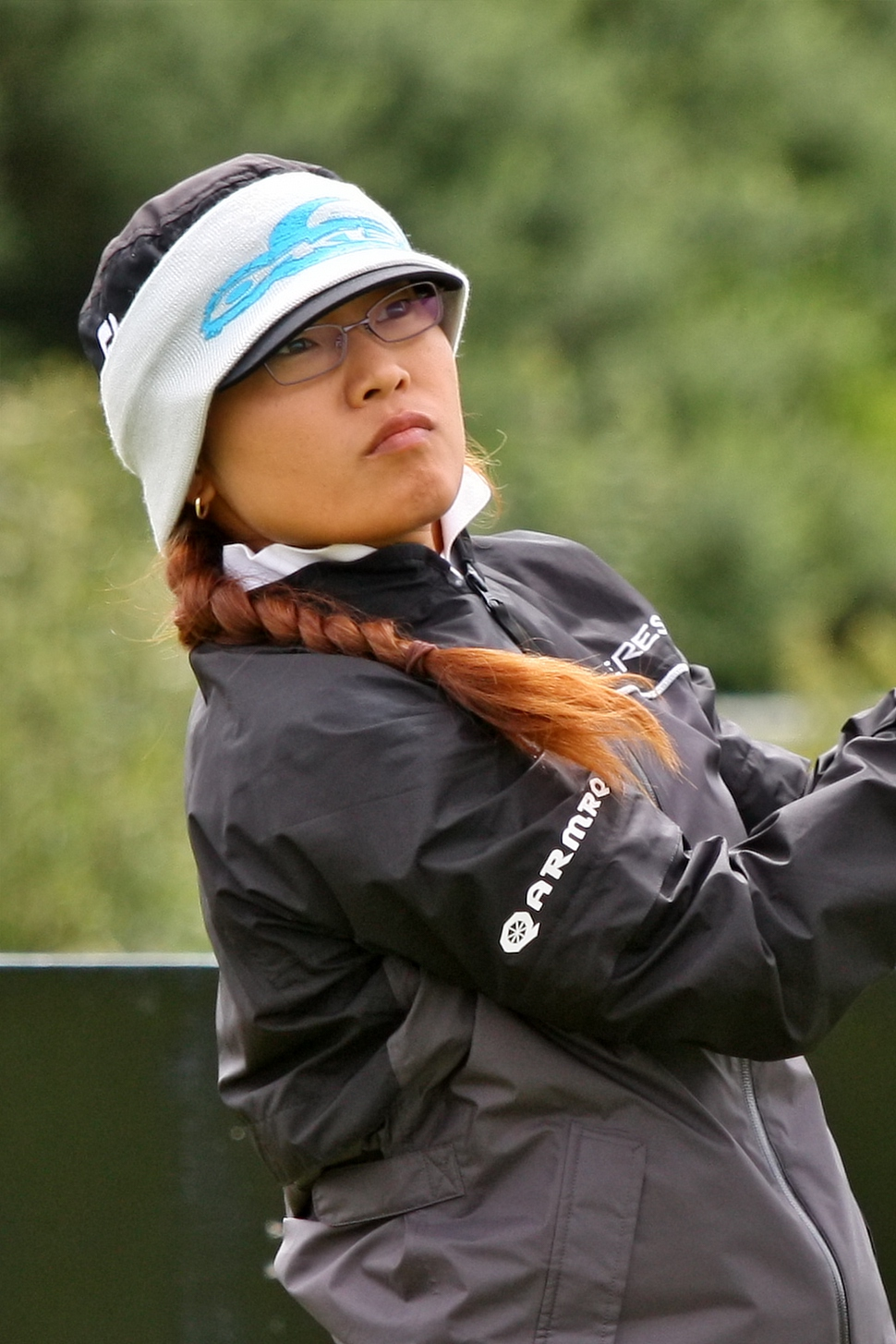
- Kang during 2010 Women's British Open

Personal information
- Nationality: South Korea
- Born: 28 January 1980 (age 46) South Korea
- Height: 5 ft 6 in (1.68 m)

Career
- Sport: Golf
- College: Arizona State University
- Turned professional: 2002
- Former tours: LPGA Tour (2003–2019); Futures Tour (2002–2004)
- Professional wins: 7

Number of wins by tour
- LPGA Tour: 2
- Epson Tour: 4
- Other: 1

Best results in LPGA major championships
- Chevron Championship: T8: 2009
- Women's PGA C'ship: T7: 2010
- U.S. Women's Open: T16: 2007
- Women's British Open: T27: 2010
- Evian Championship: DNP

Achievements and awards
- Futures Tour Player of the Year: 2004

Kang Ji-min (Korean: 강지민, born 28 January 1980) is a South Korean professional golfer who played primarily on the LPGA Tour.

Kang had a distinguished amateur career including finishing runner-up in 1999 U.S. Women's Amateur. She attended Arizona State University. She turned professional in 2002.

Kang played on the Futures Tour from 2002 to 2004, winning three times. In 2004, she won the Player of the Year honors and the money list title to earn her LPGA Tour card for 2005.

Kang won the 2005 LPGA Corning Classic, which included a hole-in-one at the short 15th hole in the final round.

In 2013, Kang was forced to take time off from golf after her immune system shut down and played the 2014 on the LPGA Tour and 2015 seasons on the Symetra Tour. She returned to Arizona State for her degree and earned her LPGA teaching certification in 2018. Kang qualified for the 2019 Women's PGA Championship via a qualifying tournament reserved for LPGA teaching and club professionals and finished T78, the only one to make the cut.

== Professional wins (7) ==
=== LPGA Tour wins (2) ===
No.	Date	Tournament	Winning score	Margin of victory	Runner(s)-up
1	29 May 2005	LPGA Corning Classic	−15 (69-70-68-66=273)	2 strokes	(South Korea) Meena Lee (Sweden) Annika Sörenstam
2	24 Oct 2010	Sime Darby LPGA Malaysia	−9 (70-69-65=204)	1 stroke	(United States) Juli Inkster

=== Symetra Tour wins (4) ===
- 2002 M&T Bank Loretto Futures Golf Classic
- 2004 Greater Tampa Duramed Futures Classic, Betty Puskar Golf Classic
- 2015 Mission Health Wellness Classic, Decatur-Forsyth Classic (unofficial, shortened to 18 holes)

== Results in LPGA majors ==
Results not in chronological order before 2019.

Tournament	1999	2000
ANA Inspiration		CUT
LPGA Championship		
U.S. Women's Open	CUT	CUT
du Maurier Classic		

Tournament	2001	2002	2003	2004	2005	2006	2007	2008	2009	2010	2011	2012
ANA Inspiration						T45	26	CUT	T8	T27	T18	CUT
LPGA Championship					T33	WD	T36	T25	CUT	T7	T25	CUT
U.S. Women's Open		CUT	CUT		CUT		T16	68	T17		CUT	T21
Women's British Open ^					CUT		T28	T59	CUT	T27	WD	CUT

Tournament	2013	2014	2015	2016	2017	2018	2019
ANA Inspiration	CUT	T46					
U.S. Women's Open			WD				CUT
Women's PGA Championship		T62					T78
The Evian Championship *							
Women's British Open ^							

^ The Women's British Open replaced the du Maurier Classic as an LPGA major in 2001.
* The Evian Championship became an LPGA major in 2013.

Top 10
Did not play

CUT = missed the half-way cut.
WD = withdrew
"T" = tied

=== Summary ===
Tournament	Wins	2nd	3rd	Top-5	Top-10	Top-25	Events	Cuts made
ANA Inspiration	0	0	0	0	1	2	10	6
U.S. Women's Open	0	0	0	0	0	3	12	4
Women's PGA Championship	0	0	0	0	1	3	10	5
The Evian Championship	0	0	0	0	0	0	0	0
Women's British Open	0	0	0	0	0	0	7	3
Totals	0	0	0	0	2	8	39	18

- Most consecutive cuts made – 4 (2007 ANA – 2007 British)
- Longest streak of top-10s – 1 (twice)
