= Taylor Coutu =

American professional golfer (born 1987)

Personal information
- Full name: Taylor Leon Coutu
- Nationality: United States
- Born: March 10, 1987 (age 39) Dallas, Texas, U.S.
- Height: 5 ft 9 in (1.75 m)

Career
- Sport: Golf
- College: University of Georgia (two years)
- Turned professional: 2007
- Current tour: LPGA Tour (joined 2008)
- Former tour: Futures Tour (joined 2007)
- Professional wins: 2

Number of wins by tour
- Epson Tour: 2

Best results in LPGA major championships
- Chevron Championship: T65: 2007
- Women's PGA C'ship: T43: 2011
- U.S. Women's Open: CUT: 2004-07, 2010
- Women's British Open: DNP

Taylor Leon Coutu (born March 10, 1987) is an American professional golfer currently playing on the LPGA Tour. She played under her maiden name, Taylor Leon, until her marriage in February 2012.

== Early life and amateur career ==
In 1987, Leon was born in Dallas, Texas. She was a two-time Rolex Junior Second-Team All-America, won two AJGA events, and represented the United States on the 2003 PING Junior Solheim Cup Team. She won the 2005 Pacific Northwest Golf Association Women's Amateur Championship and the 2006 Southern Amateur Championship. In 2005, Leon qualified for the Futures Tour while still an amateur. In 2006, she was a member of the U.S. Curtis Cup team.

Leon attended the University of Georgia for two years where she was a unanimous Southeastern Conference (SEC) Freshman of the Year selection and was named First-Team All-SEC in 2006. She was named a National Golf Coaches Association (NGCA) First-Team All-American in both 2006 and 2007.

== Professional career ==
In 2007, she turned professional. She won two of the eight tournaments she entered that year on the Futures Tour, finishing high enough on the 2007 Futures Tour money list to earn non-exempt status on the LPGA Tour for the 2008 season. She entered LPGA Qualifying school in December 2008 in an attempt to earn full-time playing status for 2009. Finishing tied for 40th in the tournament, she missed the top-20th place cut-off finish necessary to earn a fully exempt Tour card. She retains playing membership on the Futures Tour as well as limited status on the LPGA Tour for the 2009 season.

In 2008, Leon signed an endorsement deal with Brooks Brothers, becoming the company's first-ever female brand ambassador for the Brooks Brothers Country Club Collection.

== Professional wins (2) ==
=== Futures Tour (2) ===
- 2007 (2) CIGNA Golf Classic, Betty Puskar Golf Classic

== Results in LPGA majors ==
Tournament	2004	2005	2006	2007	2008	2009	2010	2011	2012
Kraft Nabisco Championship				T65					
LPGA Championship						T57	CUT	T43	70
U.S. Women's Open	CUT	CUT	CUT	CUT			CUT		
Women's British Open									

Did not play

CUT = missed the half-way cut
"T" = tied

== Team appearances ==
Amateur

- Junior Solheim Cup (representing the United States): 2003
- Curtis Cup (representing the United States): 2006 (winners)
