= Ashley Prange =

American professional golfer (born 1981)

Personal information
- Nationality: United States
- Born: November 24, 1981 (age 44) Newport Beach, California, U.S.
- Height: 5 ft 9 in (1.75 m)

Career
- Sport: Golf
- College: University of North Carolina
- Turned professional: 2005
- Former tour: Futures Tour (2005–11)
- Professional wins: 2

Number of wins by tour
- Epson Tour: 2

Best results in LPGA major championships
- Chevron Championship: DNP
- Women's PGA C'ship: DNP
- U.S. Women's Open: CUT: 2007, 2011
- Women's British Open: DNP

Ashley Prange (born November 24, 1981) is a professional golfer and winner of the reality television program The Big Break V: Hawaii.

== College and amateur career ==
Prange was born in Newport Beach, California. She graduated from the University of North Carolina in 2004 with a degree in Marketing and Advertising. She won three events and recorded 15 top-10 finishes during her career at UNC. She was a 2003 NCAA All-America Honorable Mention and 2004 NCAA First-Team All-American.

== Professional career ==
Prange won the Golf Channel's The Big Break V: Hawaii in 2006. She won two Futures Tour events in 2006. In 2007, she became a non-exempt member of the LPGA Tour and competed that year on both the LPGA Tour and the Futures Tour. She failed to perform well enough to retain her LPGA Tour playing privileges and in 2008 was back playing on the Futures Tour full-time. She last played the Futures Tour in 2011.

== College coaching career ==
Prange was an assistant coach at Stetson University from 2009 to 2011. In October 2011, Prange was hired as the coach of the women's golf team at Jacksonville University. After coaching the team for one year, she accepted an assistant coaching position at University of Central Florida.

== Personal life ==
Prange credits her father Bob Prange, who has been her "main influence, backbone and rock," as the individual most influencing her career.

Prange became engaged in July 2008 to Brian Snyder, a professional baseball player for the San Diego Padres.

== Professional wins (2) ==
=== Futures Tour (2) ===
| No. | Date | Tournament | Winning score | Margin of victory | Runner-up |
|---|---|---|---|---|---|
| 1 | Mar 19, 2006 | Greater Tampa Duramed Futures Classic | −10 (69-68-66=203) | 2 strokes | (United States) Stephanie George |
| 2 | Jul 2, 2006 | Northwest Indiana Futures Golf Classic | −2 (71-71-72=214) | 1 stroke | (United States) Lori Atsedes |
