= Amelia Lewis =

American professional golfer

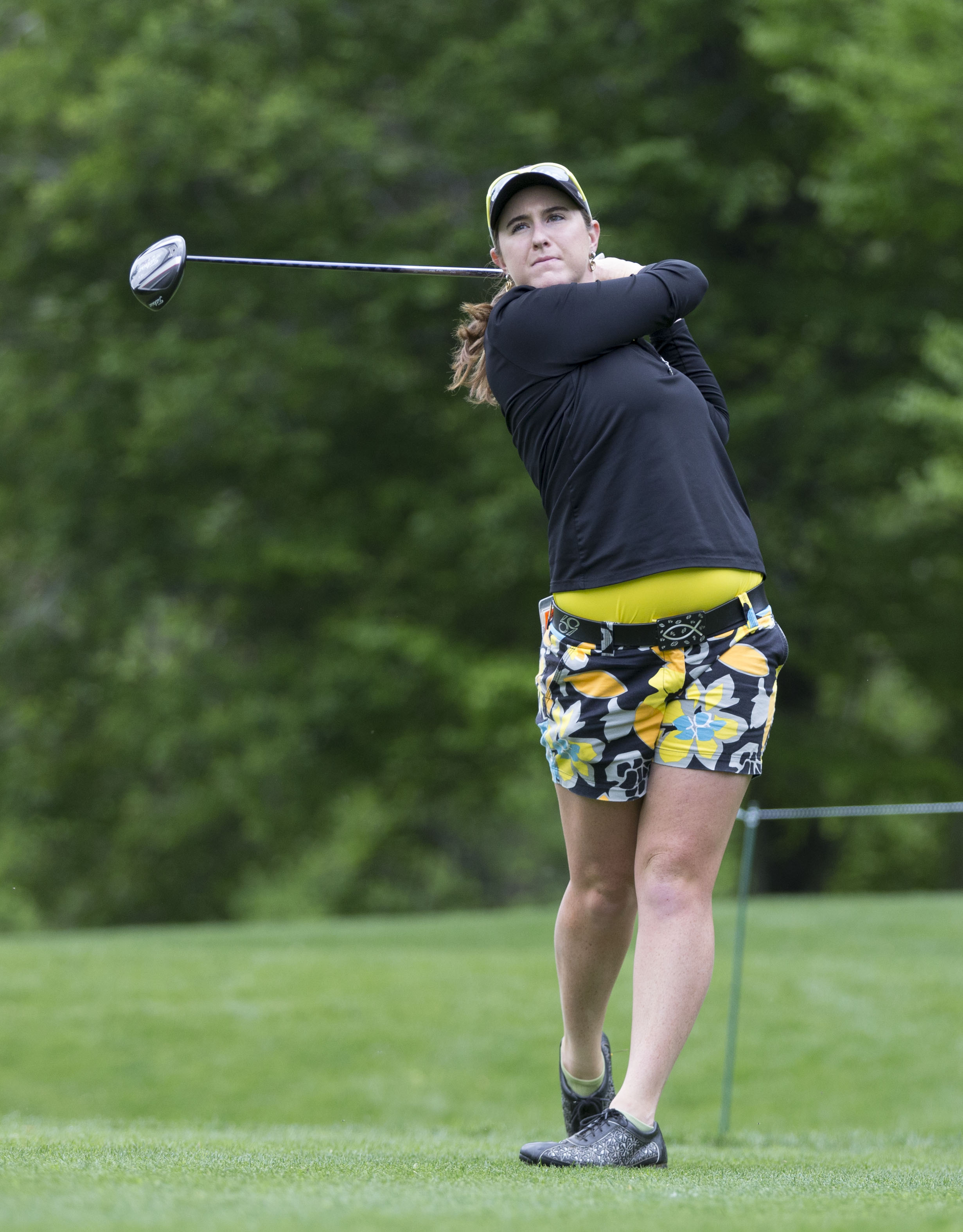
- Lewis in 2013

Personal information
- Full name: Amelia Lyn Lewis
- Nationality: United States
- Born: February 23, 1991 (age 35) Jacksonville, Florida, U.S.
- Height: 5 ft 10 in (178 cm)

Career
- Sport: Golf
- Turned professional: 2010
- Current tours: LPGA Tour; Ladies European Tour

Best results in LPGA major championships
- Chevron Championship: CUT: 2014, 2015
- Women's PGA C'ship: T55: 2012
- U.S. Women's Open: CUT: 2013, 2015, 2024
- Women's British Open: T17: 2014
- Evian Championship: T36: 2014

Amelia Lyn Lewis (born February 23, 1991) is an American professional golfer. Lewis holds over 53 titles in junior, amateur, and professional golf. She is a three-time All-First Coast Player of the Year and the 2009 Florida First Coast Scholar Athlete. She hold the course records at the Valley Course at the TPC Sawgrass where she won the 2008 CMAA World Championship and Overall championship Titles.

== Early life ==
In 1991, Lewis was born in Jacksonville, Florida, the daughter of Georgina (Hurst) and Chris Lewis. She is the oldest of four children and a fifth generation Jacksonville native.

As a junior and amateur golfer, Lewis has often played and won on the Women's and Men's amateur tours in North Florida. In May 2008, she won the annual amateur CMAA World Championship & Overall championship Titles that launched her name to the National level across the United States. Lewis earned her entry from the Women's Champion status of the San Jose Country Club in Jacksonville, Florida. She went to the National Championship and set a new course record for her first day score of a 67 (5-under-par) on the Valley Course, and then won the CMAA women's division with a total score of 2 under par on the TPC Sawgrass. Later, in the CMAA Ultimate Division against the Men's Champion and Senior Men's Champion, Women's Champion Lewis, at 17 years old, completed a 15-foot birdie putt on the stadium course's 18th hole to win 2008 Ultimate Champion. Lewis attended the private preparatory school The Bolles School, graduating in 2009 with Honors.

== Amateur career ==
One year later after her high school graduation, Lewis won the 2009 North and South Women's Amateur Golf Championship. The North and South Women's Amateur is an invitational tournament, participants are chosen based upon their performance in national amateur championships and overall competitive record. Also in the summer of 2009, she qualified for the U.S. Women's Amateur and upset top seeded Danielle Kang in the first round of match play.

She attended one semester at the University of Florida where she played on the women's golf team. She left college in December 2009. For nine months from August 2009 until she turned professional in April 2010 Lewis held the third-place ranking on the Golfweek Women's Amateur golf rankings right behind first place Lexi Thompson.

== Professional career ==
In 2010, after receiving a full exempt status of a class A-3 from the LPGA she turned professional. She joined the LPGA Symetra Tour in April 2010. She won her first professional tournament six months later on the Suncoast Series Professional Tour. In December 2010 at age 19, Lewis became the first Jacksonville, Florida, native to be fully exempt on the LPGA Tour since Colleen Walker in 1982, some 28 years earlier. In the following year, in December 2011, Lewis joined the Ladies European Tour.

== Awards and honors ==
- From 2006-2008, she was a Florida All-First Coast Player of the Year.
- In 2008, she was a Rolex All American in the honorable mention category.
- In 2009, she was a Florida Times-Union Scholar Athlete.

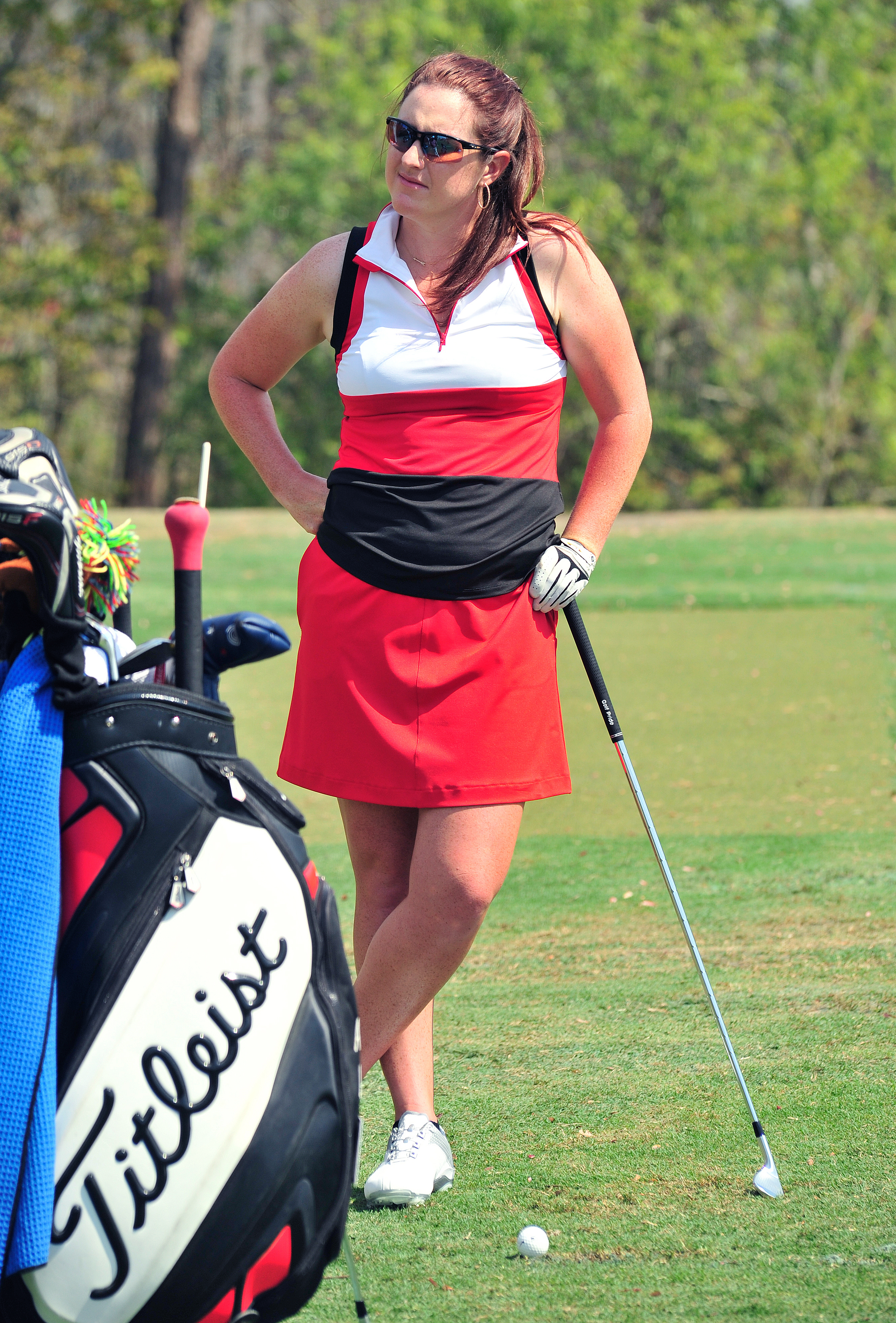
Lewis, pictured 2016.

== Amateur wins ==
- 2008 SJCC Ladies Club Champion, NCC CMAA Ultimate Champion * playoff of men & senior men's champions, NCC CMAA Women's Champion
- 2009 North and South Women's Amateur
