= Emily Glaser =

American college golf coach and former professional golfer (born 1980)

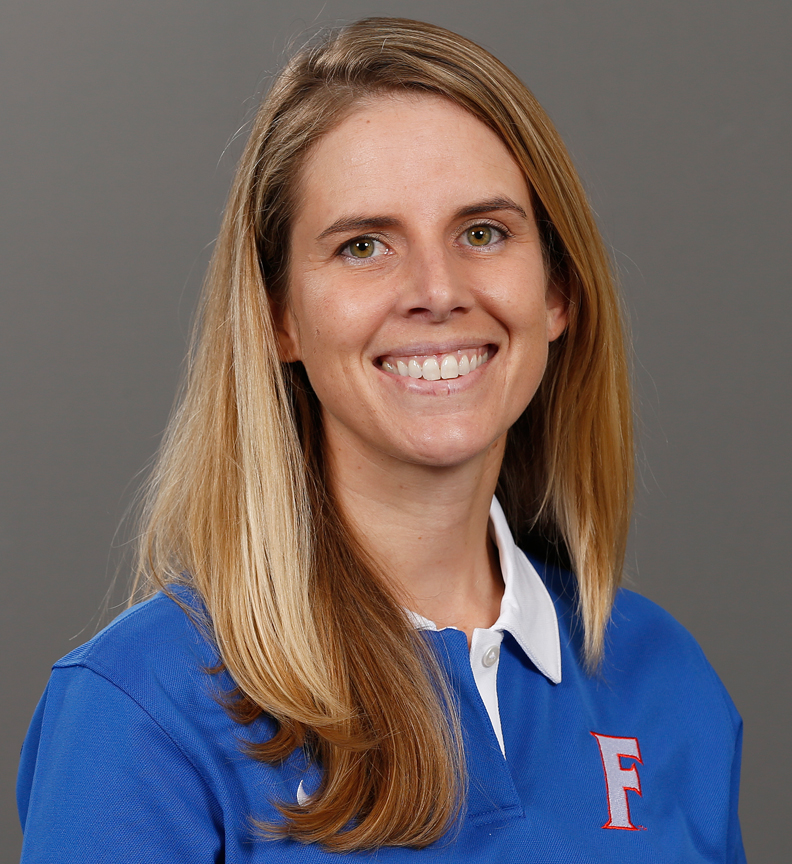

Current position
- Title: Head coach
- Team: Florida Gators women's golf

Biographical details
- Born: August 6, 1980 (age 46); Upper Sandusky, Ohio, U.S.

Coaching career (HC unless noted)
- 2002–2003: Michigan State (asst)
- 2009–2010: Duke (asst)
- 2011–2012: Florida (asst)
- 2012–present: Florida

Accomplishments and honors

Championships
- Ohio State Women's Amateur (1999, 2001, 2003); Big Ten individual medalist (2000); Big Ten team championship (2001)

Awards
- All-Big Ten (1999, 2000, 2001, 2002); MSU George Alderton Athlete of Year (2000, 2002); Second-team All-American (2002); Michigan State Athletics Hall of Fame (2012)

Emily Bastel Glaser (born August 6, 1980), née Emily Bastel, is an American college golf coach and a former professional golfer. She played on the Futures Tour and LPGA Tour, and is currently the head coach of the Florida Gators women's golf team of the University of Florida.

== Early life ==
Bastel was born in Upper Sandusky, Ohio. The Bastel family had owned and operated a golf course since the 1930s, and her father worked as the resident pro and the course superintendent. She attended Upper Sandusky High School, where she was a three-time all-state selection for the Upper Sandusky Rams girls' golf team. She graduated from Upper Sandusky in 1998.

== College and amateur career ==
Bastel received an athletic scholarship to attend Michigan State University, and played for the Michigan State Spartans women's golf team from 1998 to 2002. She was a member of the Spartans' Big Ten Conference championship team as a junior in 2001, an All-Big Ten selection for four consecutive years, and an All-American as a senior in 2002. Bastel also earned All-Big Ten Academic honors for three years. She graduated from the university with a bachelor's degree in marketing in 2002, and was inducted into the Michigan State Athletics Hall of Fame in 2012.

She played on the U.S. teams in the Curtis Cup and Espirito Santo Trophy in 2002. Bastel was a semifinalist at the 2001 U.S. Women's Amateur, played in three U.S. Women's Opens (2002, 2004, 2005), and won the Ohio State Women's Amateur three times (1999, 2001, 2003).

== Professional career ==
Turning pro, Bastel alternated between playing on the Futures Tour (2004, 2007, 2009) and the LPGA Tour (2005, 2006, 2008), and competed as a touring pro for six years.

After failing to qualify for the LPGA Tour at the LPGA Final Qualifying Tournament in 2003, Bastel played on the Futures Tour in 2004. She finished 6th on the money list, just missing an automatic LPGA Tour card for the 2005 season. But at the 2004 LPGA Final Qualifying Tournament, she finished tied for 4th to earn her LPGA Tour card.

On the LPGA Tour in 2005, Bastel made the cut in 13 of 21 events, earning $106,491 to finish 79th on the money list. Her best finishes were T-9th at the Wendy's Championship for Children and 10th at the BMO Financial Group Canadian Women's Open, in what would be her only career top-10 LPGA Tour finishes. In 2006, she made the cut in only 3 of 22 events, earning only $19,126 to finish 145th on the money list, losing her LPGA Tour card.

After failing to regain her LPGA Tour card at qualifying school, Bastell was back on the Futures Tour in 2007. She won two events, the Jalapeno Golf Classic and the Michelob ULTRA Duramed Futures Players Championship, and was the leading money winner and Player of the Year. Thus she earned her LPGA Tour card for 2008.

On the LPGA Tour in 2008, Bastel made the cut in 8 of 24 events, earning $50,672 and finishing 135th on the money list to again lose her LPGA Tour card. Her best finish was a 15th-place tie at the LPGA Corning Classic. In the 2008 LPGA Championship, she shot an opening round 66, her career low, to tie for the lead despite not feeling well. She shot 76 in the second round to make the cut, her only in an LPGA major, but withdrew from the tournament. After failing to regain her card at qualifying school, Bastel retired from professional golf.

== Coaching career ==
Bastel served as assistant coach for Duke Blue Devils women's golf team of Duke University during the 2009–10 season. During her one year at Duke, the Blue Devils finished third in the Atlantic Coast Conference (ACC) and tied for eighth place at the 2010 NCAA championship. She accepted the open assistant coach position under Florida Gators head coach Jan Dowling for the 2011–12 season. After returning the Lady Gators to national contention at the NCAA Championship in 2012, Dowling announced her resignation as Gators head coach after only three years in May 2012.

The University Athletic Association announced a nationwide search to replace outgoing Gators coach Dowling, athletic director Jeremy Foley and his search committee held exactly one interview for the open job – with assistant coach Bastel. The committee had intended the interview to be a courtesy, but the committee members were so impressed with her interview, background and coaching philosophy that Foley promptly cancelled the nationwide search and offered her the job.

Bastel married in December 2012, and has used her married name, Emily Glaser, since then.

In her first two seasons as the Gators' head coach, Glaser's golfers finished 17th at the 2013 NCAA Championship, and 18th at the 2014 NCAA Championship.

== Personal ==
Bastel married Christian Glaser in December 2012, and now uses her married name professionally.

== Playing achievements ==
=== Amateur wins ===
- 1991 Ohio State Women's Amateur
- 2001 Ohio State Women's Amateur
- 2003 Ohio State Women's Amateur

=== Futures Tour wins ===
- 2007 Jalapeno Golf Classic, Michelob Ultra Duramed Futures Players Championship

=== U.S. national team appearances ===
Amateur

- Curtis Cup: 2002 (winners)
- Espirito Santo Trophy: 2002

== See also ==
- Florida Gators
- History of the University of Florida
- List of Michigan State University people
- University Athletic Association
