= Sarah Jane Smith (golfer) =

Australian professional golfer (born 1983)

Personal information
- Nationality: Australia
- Born: 8 July 1984 (age 42) Geelong, Victoria, Australia
- Height: 5 ft 5 in (165 cm)

Career
- Sport: Golf
- Turned professional: 2004
- Current tours: LPGA Tour (joined 2006); WPGA Tour of Australasia
- Former tour: Futures Tour (joined 2005)
- Professional wins: 3

Number of wins by tour
- WPGA Tour of Australasia: 1
- Epson Tour: 2

Best results in LPGA major championships
- Chevron Championship: T32: 2013
- Women's PGA C'ship: T11: 2018
- U.S. Women's Open: T5: 2018
- Women's British Open: T17: 2016
- Evian Championship: T30: 2016

Achievements and awards
- ALPG Tour Money List winner: 2017

Sarah Jane Smith (née Kenyon) (born 8 July 1984) is an Australian professional golfer and LPGA Tour player. She led the 2018 U.S. Women's Open at the halfway point and finished fifth, and was runner-up at the 2014 Kingsmill Championship and the 2016 Lorena Ochoa Invitational.

== Amateur career ==
Smith started playing golf at the age of 12 and represented Australia at the Astor Trophy, Tasman Cup and the Queen Sirikit Cup.

She was victorious at the 2001 Greg Norman Junior Masters, the 2002 Australian Girls' Amateur and Queensland Junior Championship, and at both the 2003 NSW Stroke Play Championship and Queensland Stroke Play Championship.

Smith was the top-ranked junior in Australia in 2002 and the top-ranked amateur in 2003. She was the low amateur at the 2004 Women's Australian Open, finishing 10th, and was a member of the Australian World Amateur Team at the 2014 Espirito Santo Trophy.

== Professional career ==
Smith turned professional in December 2004. Before establishing herself on the LPGA Tour, she won two tournaments on the LPGA Futures Tour.

Her best LPGA Tour results are a runner-up finishes at the 2014 Kingsmill Championship and the 2016 Lorena Ochoa Invitational, and she tied for third at the 2017 ISPS Handa Women's Australian Open. She was on the Australian team that competed at the 2018 International Crown.

She led the 2018 U.S. Women's Open at the halfway point, and finished tied fifth after a final round 78.

Smith also played on the ALPG Tour. In 2017, she was runner-up at the RACV Gold Coast Challenge and won the season money list. She shot 63-65 at the 2023 TPS Murray River, a mixed-gender event with the 2022–23 PGA Tour of Australasia, to win by five shots over Andrew Martin and Shae Wools-Cobb, snapping her 15-year victory drought.

== Personal life ==
Smith competed as Sarah-Jane Kenyon until she married professional caddie Duane Smith on 10 January 2009. She went on maternity leave in April 2019 and gave birth to a son, Theo.

== Amateur wins ==
- 2001 Greg Norman Junior Masters
- 2002 Australian Girls' Amateur, Queensland Junior Championship
- 2003 NSW Stroke Play Championship, Queensland Stroke Play Championship

== Professional wins (3) ==
=== Futures Tour wins (2) ===
- 2005 Greater Tampa Duramed FUTURES Classic
- 2008 Twin Bridges Championship

=== WPGA Tour of Australasia wins (1) ===
No.	Date	Tournament	Winning score	To par	Margin of victory	Runners-up
1	5 Feb 2023	TPS Murray River	67-69-63-65=264	−20	5 strokes	(Australia) Andrew Martin, (Australia) Shae Wools-Cobb

== Results in LPGA majors ==
Results not in chronological order.

Tournament	2006	2007	2008	2009	2010	2011	2012
Chevron Championship						73	
U.S. Women's Open	CUT					CUT	
Women's PGA Championship			CUT	CUT	T14	T50	T36
Women's British Open					T55	CUT	T43

Tournament	2013	2014	2015	2016	2017	2018	2019	2020	2021	2022
Chevron Championship	T32		CUT		T60	T40	74			
U.S. Women's Open	T46	CUT	CUT		CUT	T5		CUT	CUT	
Women's PGA Championship	T53	T40	CUT	T43	T14	T11		CUT		CUT
The Evian Championship ^	CUT	72	CUT	T30	T48	CUT		NT		
Women's British Open	CUT	CUT		T17	CUT	CUT		70		

^ The Evian Championship was added as a major in 2013.

Top 10
Did not play

CUT = missed the half-way cut
NT = no tournament
T = tied

== Team appearances ==
Amateur

- Astor Trophy (representing Australia): 2003
- Tasman Cup (representing Australia): 2003
- Queen Sirikit Cup (representing Australia): 2004
- Espirito Santo Trophy (representing Australia): 2004

Professional

- The Queens (representing ALPG): 2015, 2016, 2017
- International Crown (representing Australia): 2018
