= Meaghan Francella =

American professional golfer (born 1982)

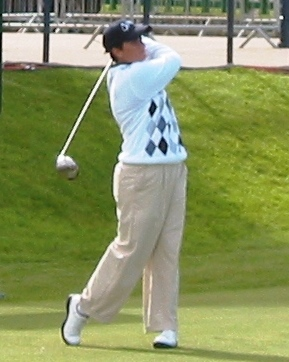
- Francella at 2007 Women's British Open

Personal information
- Nationality: United States
- Born: May 12, 1982 (age 44) Port Chester, New York, U.S.
- Height: 5 ft 4 in (1.63 m)

Career
- Sport: Golf
- College: University of Memphis; University of North Carolina
- Turned professional: 2004
- Former tours: Futures Tour (2004–2006); LPGA Tour (2006–2013)
- Professional wins: 3

Number of wins by tour
- LPGA Tour: 1
- Epson Tour: 1
- Other: 1

Best results in LPGA major championships
- Chevron Championship: T5: 2007, 2009
- Women's PGA C'ship: T7: 2010
- U.S. Women's Open: T17: 2009
- Women's British Open: T69: 2010
- Evian Championship: DNP

Meaghan Francella (born May 12, 1982) is an American professional golfer. She played on the LPGA Tour.

== Early life and amateur career ==
In 1982, Francella was born in Port Chester, New York. She twice the New York State Junior Champion. Francella attended high school at the School of the Holy Child in Rye, New York.

Francella attended the University of Memphis for college. She was named Conference USA Freshman of the Year in 2001. Francella transferred to the University of North Carolina for her junior year. While at North Carolina she was the 2003 Atlantic Coast Conference individual champion and was an NCAA First-Team All-American in 2004. Francella graduated with a degree in communications in 2005.

== Professional career ==
After completing her college eligibility in 2004, Francella joined the Futures Tour. She finished 65th at the 2005 LPGA Qualifying School to earn non-exempt status for the 2006 season. In 2006, she made three starts on the LPGA Tour, making one cut. On the Futures Tour, she won one event, the Lakeland Duramed Futures Classic, and recorded six additional top-10 finishes. She ended the season fifth on the Futures Tour money list which earned her fully exempt status on the LPGA Tour for 2007.

Francella's first win on the LPGA Tour came in her second start of 2007 at the MasterCard Classic, where she scored 68-68-69 with only two bogies over the three-round tournament and then held off world number one Annika Sörenstam in a four-hole playoff.

== Awards and honors ==
- In 2001, while at the University of Memphis, she earned Conference USA Freshman of the Year honors.
- In 2004, while at the University of North Carolina at Chapel Hill, Francella earned All-American honors.

== Professional wins (3) ==
=== LPGA Tour wins (1) ===
No.	Date	Tournament	Winning score	Margin of victory	Runner-up
1	Mar 11, 2007	MasterCard Classic	−11 (68-68-69=205)	Playoff	(Sweden) Annika Sörenstam

LPGA Tour playoff record (1–0)

No.	Year	Tournament	Opponent	Result
1	2007	MasterCard Classic	(Sweden) Annika Sörenstam	Won with birdie on fourth extra hole

=== Futures Tour wins (1) ===
- 2006 (1) Lakeland Duramed Futures Classic

=== Other wins (1) ===
- 2010 (1) HSBC LPGA Brasil Cup (unofficial event on the LPGA Tour)

== Results in LPGA majors ==
Tournament	2007	2008	2009	2010	2011	2012	2013	2014–21	2022
Chevron Championship	T5	70	T5	CUT	T25	CUT			
U.S. Women's Open	CUT	CUT	T17	T34	T42				
Women's PGA Championship	T21	T77	T71	T7	CUT	T67	CUT		CUT
The Evian Championship ^									
Women's British Open	CUT		CUT	T69	CUT				

^ The Evian Championship was added as a major in 2013.

Top 10
Did not play

CUT = missed the half-way cut
T = tied

== LPGA Tour career summary ==
Year	Tournaments played	Cuts made*	Wins	2nd	3rd	Top 10s	Best finish	Earnings ($)	Money list rank	Scoring average	Scoring rank
2005	1	1	0	0	0	0	T69	2,525	n/a	75.00	n/a
2006	3	1	0	0	0	0	T39	5,5554	183	73.75	n/a
2007	25	18	1	0	0	4	1	507,292	29	73.09	66
2008	24	11	0	0	0	0	T13	117,682	88	73.75	131
2009	22	16	0	0	0	2	T5	292,266	48	72.51	63
2010	21	17	0	0	0	1	T7	168,016	57	73.04	77
2011	15	8	0	0	0	0	T22	66,813	84	74.23	117
2012	15	4	0	0	0	0	T24	28,935	116	74.37	121
2013	14	3	0	0	0	0	T71	7,838	148	74.10	133

- Official through November 24, 2013

* Includes matchplay and other events without a cut.
