= Forsyth Classic =

The Forsyth Classic was an event on the Symetra Tour, the LPGA's developmental tour. It had been a part of the Symetra Tour's schedule since 1985. It was held at the Hickory Point Golf Course in Decatur, Illinois.

Since 2006, the tournament had been the Symetra Tour's first and only major championship. The tournament underwent two changes for its first season as a major tournament: it became the Tour's first 72-hole event, and the purse increased to $100,000 with the winner receiving $14,000. The winner also receives a sponsor's exemption into the LPGA's State Farm Classic tournament.

From 2010 to 2012, the title sponsor of the tournament was Tate & Lyle, a multinational agri-processor based in England. Between 2013 and 2016, they remained the presenting sponsor.

== Winners ==
| Year | Winner | Notes |
Forsyth Classic
| 2019 | Jillian Hollis | |
| 2018 | Isi Gabsa | |
Decatur-Forsyth Classic
| 2017 | Chorphaka Jaengkit | |
| 2016 | Clariss Guce | |
| 2015 | Jimin Kang | Unofficial win, shortened to 18 holes |
| 2014 | Madison Pressel | |
| 2013 | Sue Kim | |
Tate & Lyle Players Championship
| 2012 | Kristie Smith | |
| 2011 | Valentine Derrey | |
| 2010 | Jennifer Song | |
Michelob Ultra Duramed Players Championship
| 2009 | Mina Harigae | |
| 2008 | Vicky Hurst | |
| 2007 | Emily Bastel | |
| 2006 | Salimah Mussani | |
Michelob Ultra Futures Charity Golf Classic
| 2005 | Jenny Gleason | |
| 2004 | Aram Cho | |
Michelob Light Futures Charity Golf Classic
| 2003 | Stephanie George | |
Junior Welfare Association/Michelob Light Futures Charity Golf Classic
| 2002 | Lorena Ochoa | |
| 2001 | Angela Buzminski | |
| 2000 | Nicole Jeray | |
JWA/Anheuser-Busch Futures Charity Golf Classic
| 1999 | Lisa Jensen | |
| 1998 | Nicole Jeray | |
| 1997 | Jennifer Feldott | |
| 1996 | Marilyn Lovander | |
| 1995 | Lisa Grimes | |
| 1994 | Laura Broadbent | |
| 1993 | Margaret Platt | |
| 1992 | Kristal Parker | |
| 1991 | Marianne Morris | |
JWA Futures Charity Golf Classic
| 1990 | Denise Baldwin | |
| 1989 | Vickie Moran | |
Magna/Millikin Bank Classic
| 1988 | Lois Ledbetter | |
| 1987 | Wendy VerBrugge | |
| 1986 | Tammie Green | |
Decatur Visitors Bureau Classic
| 1985 | Tammie Green | |
