= 2009 Duramed Futures Tour =

Women's golf tour season

The 2009 Duramed Futures Tour was a series of professional women's golf tournaments held from March through September 2009 in the United States. The Futures Tour is the second-tier women's professional golf tour in the United States and is the "official developmental tour" of the LPGA Tour. In 2009, total prize money on the Futures Tour was $1,795,000, the highest in the 29-year history of the Tour.

== Leading money winners ==
The top ten money winners at the end of the season gained membership on the LPGA Tour for the 2010 season, with those finishing in the top five positions gaining higher priority for entry into events than those finishing in positions six through ten. Finishers in positions six through ten had the option to attend LPGA Qualifying School to try to improve their membership status for 2010.

Position	Player	Country	Earnings (US$)
1	Mina Harigae	United States	88,386
2	Jean Reynolds	United States	76,647
3	Misun Cho	South Korea	64,118
4	Samantha Richdale	Canada	59,292
5	Song Yi Choi	South Korea	42,939
6	Whitney Wade	United States	41,393
7	Angela Buzminski	Canada	37,048
8	Christine Song	United States	35,130
9	Alison Walshe	United States	34,225
10	Dewi Claire Schreefel	Netherlands	30,600

== Schedule and results ==
The number in parentheses after winners' names show the player's total number of official money, individual event wins on the Futures Tour including that event.

Dates	Tournament	Location	Winner
Mar 22	Florida's Natural Growers Charity Classic	Florida	(United States) Jean Reynolds (1)
Apr 5	iMPACT Invitational	Florida	(South Korea) Misun Cho (1)
Apr 19	Louisiana Pelican Classic	Louisiana	(Canada) Samantha Richdale (2)
Apr 26	Historic Brownsville Open	Texas	(Canada) Angela Buzminski (5)
May 3	Texas Hill Country Classic	Texas	(United States) Allison Hanna-Williams (1)
May 17	Mercedes-Benz of Kansas City Championship	Kansas	(Spain) Elisa Serramia (1)
Jun 7	Ladies Titan Tire Challenge	Iowa	(United States) Mina Harigae (1)
Jun 14	**Michelob Ultra Duramed Futures Players Championship**	Illinois	(United States) Mina Harigae (2)
Jun 21	The Duramed Championship	Ohio	(United States) Whitney Wade (1)
Jun 28	Horseshoe Casino Classic at Lost Marsh Golf Course	Indiana	(United States) Jean Reynolds (2)
Jul 19	ING New England Golf Classic	Connecticut	(Netherlands) Dewi Claire Schreefel (1)
Jul 26	USI Championship	New Hampshire	(South Korea) Misun Cho (2)
Aug 2	Alliance Bank Golf Classic	New York	(United States) Jenny Suh (1)
Aug 9	Falls Auto Group Classic	Kentucky	(United States) Mina Harigae (3)
Aug 16	iMPACT Classic	Virginia	(Canada) Lisa Meldrum (1)
Aug 23	Turkey Hill Classic	Pennsylvania	(Canada) Samantha Richdale (3)
Sep 6	ILOVENY Championship	New York	(South Korea) Song Yi Choi (1)

Tournaments in bold are majors

== See also ==
- 2009 in golf
