= Dewi Claire Schreefel =

Dutch professional golfer

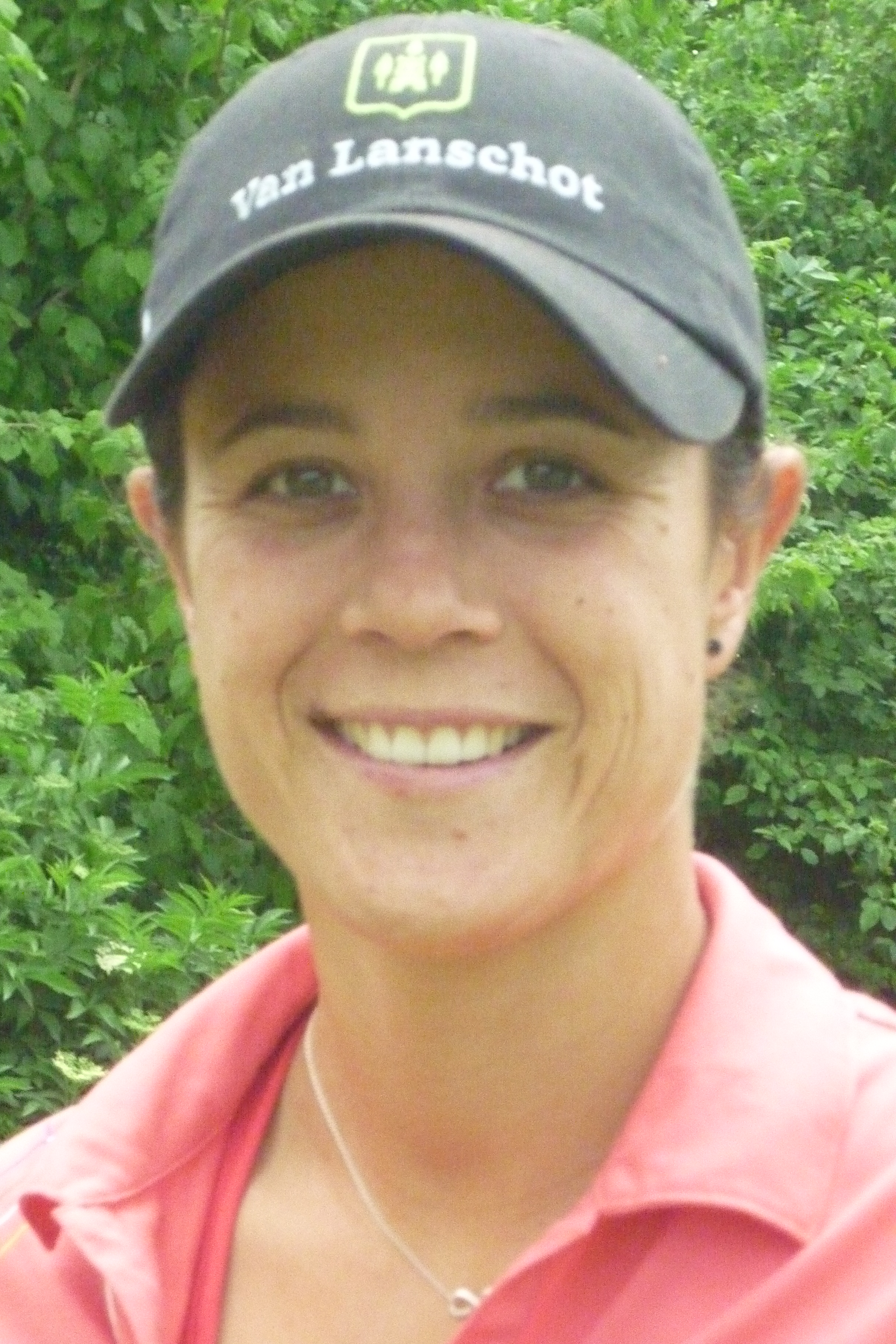

Personal information
- Nationality: Netherlands
- Born: 12 November 1985 (age 40) Alkmaar, Netherlands
- Height: 5 ft 4 in (1.63 m)

Career
- Sport: Golf
- College: University of Southern California
- Turned professional: 2008
- Current tours: LPGA Tour (joined 2010); Ladies European Tour
- Former tour: Futures Tour (joined 2009)
- Professional wins: 2

Number of wins by tour
- Ladies European Tour: 1
- Epson Tour: 1

Best results in LPGA major championships
- Chevron Championship: T66: 2012
- Women's PGA C'ship: T57: 2011
- U.S. Women's Open: T36: 2013
- Women's British Open: T11: 2011
- Evian Championship: 70th: 2014

Dewi Claire Schreefel (born 12 November 1985) is a Dutch professional golfer currently playing on the LPGA Tour and formerly on the Futures Tour.

== Early life ==
Schreefel was born in Alkmaar, Netherlands on 12 November 1985. She resides in the village of Diepenveen located within the municipality of Deventer. Her father is Indonesian and her mother is Dutch.

== Amateur career ==
As a junior player, Schreefel won the Dutch Stroke-Play Championship five times, in 1999, 2000, 2002, 2003 and 2004. She also won the 2004 Italian Women's Amateur Championship and the Dutch Match-Play Championship. She attended the University of Southern California where she was a member of the 2008 NCAA National Championship winning team, was the 2006 NCAA Individual champion, a three-time All-American and finished in the top-10 14 times. She had three wins during her college career. She graduated with a bachelor's degree in sociology.

Schreefel was part of the Dutch team finishing silver medalists at the 2008 European Ladies' Team Championship after host nation Sweden at Stenungsund Golf Club. She also played for the Netherlands five times in a row at the Espirito Santo Trophy, last time in 2008 in Adelaide, Australia.

== Professional career ==
In 2008, Schreefel turned professional. She joined the Futures Tour on 27 January 2009. She had one win on the Futures Tour in her rookie season and finished tenth on the season-ending money list to earn LPGA Tour status for 2010, although she was unable to gain entry into any LPGA events in 2010 because of her low status on the LPGA priority list and she played a second full season on the Futures Tour that year. She finished tied for fourth place in the LPGA Final Qualifying Tournament on 12 December 2010 to earn full playing status on the LPGA for 2011.

== Professional wins (2) ==
=== Ladies European Tour wins (1) ===
No.	Date	Tournament	Winning score	Margin of victory	Runner-up
1	7 Sep 2014	Helsingborg Open	−17 (67-70-68-66=271)	7 strokes	(Australia) Rebecca Artis

=== Futures Tour wins (1) ===
No.	Date	Tournament	Winning score	Margin of victory	Runners-up
1	19 Jul 2009	ING New England Golf Classic	−8 (69-64-69=202)	3 strokes	(South Korea) Aimee Cho, (United States) Hannah Jun, (Australia) Kristie Smith

== Results in LPGA majors ==
Results not in chronological order before 2015.

Tournament	2007	2009	2011	2012	2013	2014	2015
ANA Inspiration	CUT			T66	CUT	T71	CUT
Women's PGA Championship			T57	T62	CUT	72	CUT
U.S. Women's Open		CUT	CUT	T57	T36	CUT	CUT
Women's British Open			T11	T47	T56	CUT	CUT
The Evian Championship ^					CUT	70	

^ The Evian Championship was added as a major in 2013

Did not play

CUT = missed the half-way cut
"T" = tied

== Team appearances ==
Amateur

- European Girls' Team Championship (representing Netherlands): 1999, 2000
- Junior Ryder Cup (representing Europe): 2002 (winners)
- Junior Solheim Cup (representing Europe): 2002, 2003 (winners)
- European Ladies' Team Championship (representing Netherlands): 2001, 2003, 2005, 2007, 2008
- Espirito Santo Trophy (representing Netherlands): 2000, 2002, 2004, 2006, 2008
