= Kristy McPherson =

American professional golfer (born 1981)

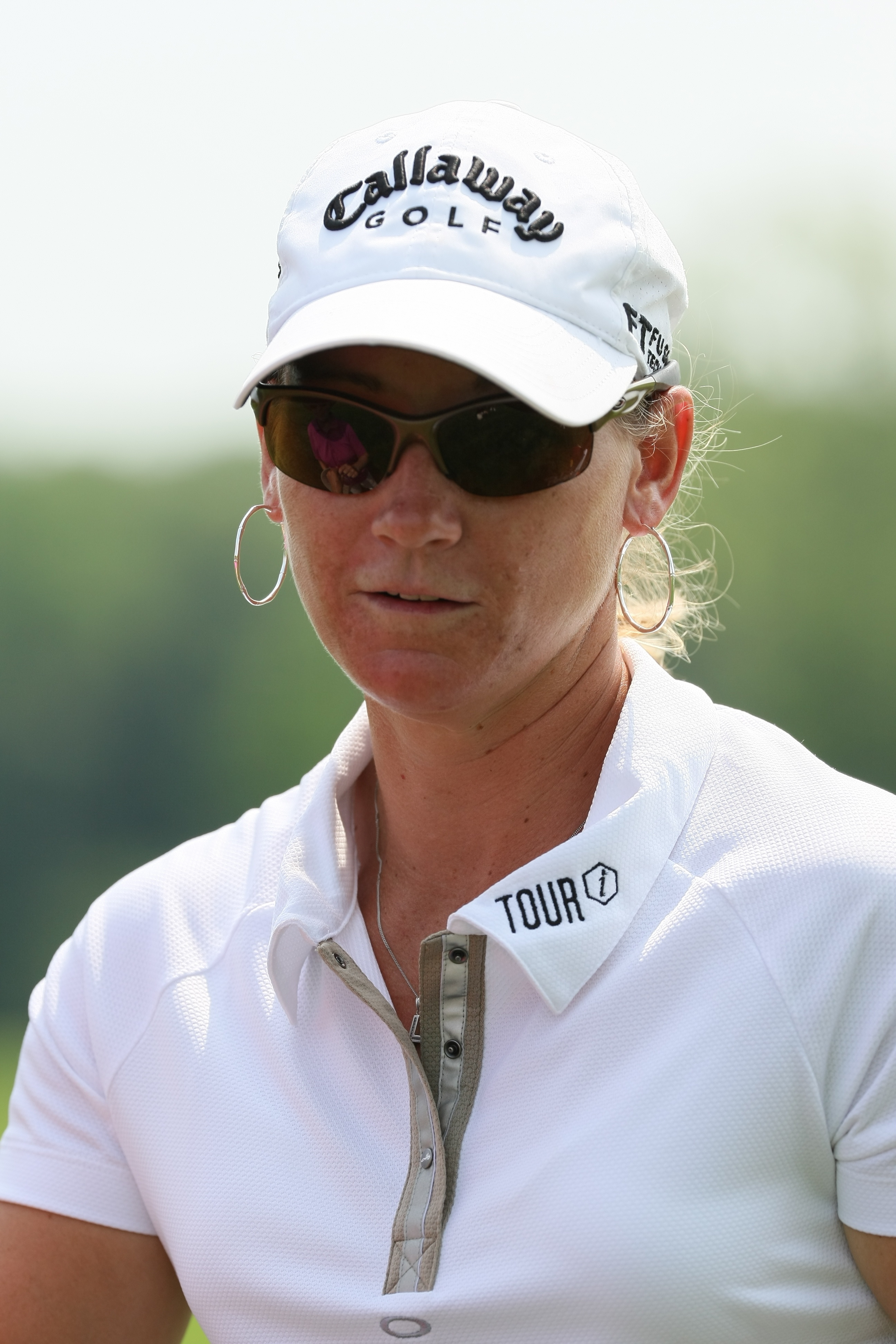
- McPherson at the 2009 LPGA Championship

Personal information
- Nationality: United States
- Born: May 28, 1981 (age 45) Conway, South Carolina, U.S.
- Height: 5 ft 6 in (1.68 m)

Career
- Sport: Golf
- College: South Carolina
- Turned professional: 2003
- Current tours: LPGA Tour (joined 2007); Symetra Tour (joined 2003)
- Professional wins: 2

Number of wins by tour
- Epson Tour: 2

Best results in LPGA major championships
- Chevron Championship: T2: 2009
- Women's PGA C'ship: T5: 2009
- U.S. Women's Open: T19: 2010
- Women's British Open: 7th: 2009
- Evian Championship: T54: 2014

Achievements and awards
- Honda Inspiration Award: 2003

Kristy McPherson (born May 28, 1981) is an American professional golfer, currently playing on the LPGA Tour.

== Early life and amateur career ==
A native of South Carolina, McPherson was diagnosed with Still's disease at age 11, which is a form of juvenile idiopathic arthritis. Confined mostly to bed and unable to walk for a year, she was told she would no longer be able to compete in any sport that required jumping or running. As a result, she took up golf and played on the boys' golf team at her high school. She earned a golf scholarship to the University of South Carolina, and recorded seven victories in her four-year collegiate career. McPherson graduated in 2003 with a bachelor's degree in sports and entertainment management. In 2003, McPherson was awarded the Honda Inspiration Award, which is given to a collegiate athlete "who has overcome hardship and was able to return to play at the collegiate level". She overcame Still's disease, and rebounded to become an accomplished golfer.

== The Big Break ==
While on the Futures Tour, McPherson appeared on the Golf Channel reality show The Big Break VI, which was filmed during a two-week period in late June and early July 2006. McPherson was the fifth player eliminated from the show.

== Professional career ==
After graduating from college, McPherson turned professional and competed on the Futures Tour for four years. From 2003 to 2006 she competed in 60 events, never missed a cut, and won twice. Her fourth-place finish on the Futures Tour money list in 2006 earned her an LPGA Tour card for the 2007 season.

Her first season on the LPGA brought limited success, with a best finish a tie for 18th; she finished the season 97th on the money list. In 2008, her second year, she recorded six top-10 finishes, and finished 47th on the official money list. In 2009, McPherson recorded a T-2 in a LPGA major, the Kraft Nabisco Championship, followed by a T-5 three months later at the next major, the LPGA Championship.

== Professional wins (2) ==
=== Futures Tour wins (2) ===
No.	Date	Tournament	Winning score	To par	Margin of victory	Winner's share ($)
1	Apr 30, 2006	Jalapeno Futures Golf Classic	72-68-65=205	–11	1 stroke	9,800
2	Aug 13, 2006	Betty Puskar Futures Golf Classic	68-72-67=207	–9	1 stroke	10,500

== Results in LPGA majors ==
Results not in chronological order before 2019.

Tournament	2005	2006	2007	2008	2009	2010	2011	2012	2013	2014	2015	2016	2017	2018	2019	2020	2021
ANA Inspiration					T2	T34	T41	CUT									
U.S. Women's Open	CUT				T34	T19	CUT	T60	T36	CUT							
Women's PGA Championship			CUT	T25	T5	CUT	T50	CUT	T15	T53	CUT					CUT	CUT
The Evian Championship ^									CUT	T54						NT	
Women's British Open				T21	7	CUT	T43	CUT	CUT	68							

^ The Evian Championship was added as a major in 2013.

Top 10
Did not play

CUT = missed the half-way cut
NT = no tournament
T = tied

=== Summary ===
Tournament	Wins	2nd	3rd	Top-5	Top-10	Top-25	Events	Cuts made
ANA Inspiration	0	1	0	0	1	1	4	3
U.S. Women's Open	0	0	0	0	0	1	7	4
Women's PGA Championship	0	0	0	1	1	3	11	5
The Evian Championship	0	0	0	0	0	0	2	1
Women's British Open	0	0	0	0	1	2	7	4
Totals	0	1	0	1	3	7	31	17

- Most consecutive cuts made – 7 (2008 LPGA – 2010 Kraft Nabisco)
- Longest streak of top-10s – 2 (2009 Kraft Nabisco – 2009 LPGA)

== LPGA Tour career summary ==
Year	Tournaments played	Cuts made	Wins	2nd	3rd	Top 10s	Best finish	Earnings ($)	Money list rank	Scoring average	Scoring rank
2005	1	0	0	0	0	0	MC	0	n/a	77.00	n/a
2007	18	11	0	0	0	0	T18	79,724	97	73.73	T99
2008	26	19	0	0	0	6	T4	407,237	47	71.86	34
2009	24	21	0	2	1	6	T2	816,182	16	71.25	17
2010	22	17	0	1	0	4	T2	418,217	27	72.26	40
2011	21	17	0	0	0	0	T18	157,025	56	72.65	50
2012	23	11	0	0	0	0	T24	88,674	82	73.55	94
2013	19	11	0	0	0	0	T15	108,615	83	72.76	81
2014	20	11	0	0	0	0	T18	83,900	96	73.05	120
2015	18	4	0	0	0	0	T46	14,903	146	74.34	141
2016	5	0	0	0	0	0	MC	0	n/a	74.10	n/a
2017	3	0	0	0	0	0	MC	0	n/a	73.33	n/a
2018	2	0	0	0	0	0	MC	0	n/a	74.25	n/a
2019	10	1	0	0	0	0	T74	3,672	177	73.40	148
2020	5	1	0	0	0	1	T9	46,777	109	73.09	n/a
2021	11	3	0	0	0	0	15	31,670	146	73.00	131
2022	4	1	0	0	0	0	T36	4,841	194	74.33	n/a
2023	5	1	0	0	0	0	33	6,397	188	74.38	n/a
2024	1	0	0	0	0	0	MC	0	n/a	75.50	n/a
2025	2	0	0	0	0	0	CUT	0	n/a	74.00	n/a

Official through the 2025 season

== Symetra Tour summary ==
Year	Tournaments played	Cuts made	Wins	2nd	3rd	Top 10s	Best finish	Earnings ($)	Money list rank	Scoring average	Scoring rank
2003	9	9	0	0	1	2	T3	12,636	11	71.50	4
2004	18	18	0	0	0	1	T4	14,857	27	72.67	20
2005	16	16	0	1		5	T2	17,874	14	72.38	14
2006	17	17	2	0	0	6	1	40,558	4	71.67	5
2016	16	9	0	0	1	1	T3	16,557	55	73.16	46
2017	18	12	0	0	0	1	T6	12,086	67	73.55	89
2018	17	12	0	0	2	3	T3	32,333	29	71.66	35
2019	9	8	0	0	0	1	T4	15,892	76	72.25	45

== Team appearances ==
Professional

- Solheim Cup (representing the United States): 2009 (winners)
