= Epson Tour =

Golf tour

- Current season, competition or edition: 2026 Epson Tour
- Formerly: Symetra Tour; Duramed Futures Tour; LPGA Futures Tour
- Sport: Golf
- Founded: 1981
- First season: 1981
- Country: United States
- Continent: North America
- Related competitions: LPGA Tour
- Website: epsontour.com

The Epson Tour, previously known as the LPGA Futures Tour, and known for sponsorship reasons between 2006 and 2010 as the Duramed Futures Tour and between 2012 and 2021 as the Symetra Tour, is the official developmental golf tour of the LPGA Tour. Tour membership is open to professional women golfers and to qualified amateurs.

== History ==
The Futures Tour was founded in Florida in 1981 as the "Tampa Bay Mini Tour". It officially became the Futures Golf Tour in 1983 and in 1999 become a national tour designated as the "official developmental tour" of the LPGA Tour (the U.S.-based professional women's golf tour).

Grace Park, Marilyn Lovander and Audra Burks were the first players to receive automatic LPGA Tour exempt status by finishing one, two, and three on the Futures Golf Tour Money List.

The minimum age for participation was lowered to 17 prior to the 2006 season. On July 18, 2007, the LPGA officially announced that it had acquired the Futures Tour effective immediately, "bringing women's professional golf now under one umbrella." Previously the Futures Tour had operated as a licensee of the LPGA.

Duramed, a pharmaceutical company, was the tour's title sponsor from 2006 through the end of the 2010 season. In 2011, the tour was known as the "LPGA Futures Tour." In 2012, Symetra, a United States-based insurance provider, became the title sponsor of the tour and tour's name was changed to "Symetra Tour". In January 2022, the LPGA signed a five-year title sponsorship agreement with Epson America Inc.

== Promotion to LPGA ==
=== 1999–2007 ===
From 1999 through 2007 the top five leading money winners at the end of each season earned full membership in the following season's LPGA Tour. Starting with the sixth-ranked player at the end of the season, ten additional Futures Tour players who are not already members of the LPGA, automatically advanced into the LPGA Final Qualifying Tournament, bypassing the sectional qualifying tournament.

=== 2008–2010 ===
Beginning in 2008 the process for promotion to the LPGA Tour was changed. The top ten leading money winners at the end of the season gain membership on the LPGA Tour for the next season, with those finishing in the top five positions gaining higher priority for entry into events than those finishing in positions six through ten. Finishers in positions sixth through ten still have the option to attend LPGA Qualifying School to try to improve their membership for the following season.

=== 2011–2023 ===
Beginning in 2011, the promotion process was changed slightly to allow the next 24 players, excluding current LPGA members, after the top ten qualifiers to automatic entry into Stage III of the LPGA Qualifying Tournament.

=== 2024–present ===
Beginning in 2024 the top fifteen leading money winners at the end of the season gain membership on the LPGA Tour for the next season, with those finishing in the top ten positions gaining higher priority for entry into events than those finishing in positions eleven through fifteen.

== Players ==
Futures Tour graduates include LPGA tournament winners Laura Davies, Meaghan Francella, Hannah Green, Cristie Kerr, Christina Kim, Nelly Korda, Mo Martin, Lorena Ochoa, Grace Park, Inbee Park, Stacy Prammanasudh, Sherri Steinhauer, Brooke Henderson and Karrie Webb.

== Historical tour schedules and results ==
Year	Number of tournaments	Total prize money (US$)	Prize money ($) per tournament
2026	19	4,700,000	247,368
2025	20	5,000,000	250,000
2024	19	5,000,000	263,158
2023	22	5,000,000	227,000
2022	21	4,410,000	210,000
2021	20	3,800,000	190,000
2020	10	1,625,000	162,500
2019	23	4,000,000	173,913
2018	21	2,990,000	142,381
2017	22	2,950,000	134,091
2016	23	3,125,000	135,870
2015	23	2,420,000	105,217
2014	20	2,250,000	112,500
2013	15	1,625,000	108,333
2012	16	1,755,000	109,688
2011	16	1,765,000	110,313
2010	17	1,920,000	112,941
2009	17	1,795,000	105,588
2008	18	1,710,000	95,000
2007	19	1,585,000	83,421
2006	19	1,425,000	75,000

== Awards ==
- The Player of the Year Award is given to the player who leads the money list at the end of the season.
- The Gaëlle Truet Rookie of the Year Award is awarded to the player competing in her first professional season who finishes highest on the money list. Truet was a Tour member who was killed in a car accident during the 2006 season. The award was renamed in her honor beginning in 2006.
- The Trainor Award has been given each year since 1999 to an individual or group that has made a significant contribution to women's golf. It is named in honor of the Tour's founder and former president, Eloise Trainor.
- The Heather Wilbur Spirit Award has been given each year since 2003 to a tour player who "best exemplifies dedication, courage, perseverance, love of the game and spirit toward achieving goals as a professional golfer." It is named in memory of Heather Wilbur, a four-year Futures Tour player who died from leukemia in 2000 at age 27.

Year	Player of the Year	Rookie of the Year	Trainor Award	Heather Wilbur Spirit Award
2026	(Malaysia) Mirabel Ting	(Malaysia) Mirabel Ting		
2025	(United States) Melanie Green	(United States) Melanie Green	—N/a	Kim Kaufman
2024	(United States) Lauren Stephenson	(China) Zhang Yahui	—N/a	Fátima Fernández Cano
2023	(Australia) Gabriela Ruffels	(Malaysia) Natasha Andrea Oon	—N/a	(United States) Hannah Arnold
2022	(Sweden) Linnea Ström	(China) Yin Xiaowen	—N/a	Lindsey McCurdy
2021	(United States) Lilia Vu	(United States) Amanda Doherty	—N/a	(United States) Nannette Hill
2020	(Slovenia) Ana Belac	(Slovenia) Ana Belac	—N/a	—N/a
2019	(France) Perrine Delacour	(Thailand) Patty Tavatanakit	—N/a	—N/a
2018	(China) Ruixin Liu	(Sweden) Linnea Ström	Jim and Denise Medford	(United States) Portland Rosen
2017	(Thailand) Benyapa Niphatsophon	(Australia) Hannah Green	Potawatomi Nation tribes	(United States) Laura Wearn
2016	(Sweden) Madelene Sagström	(Sweden) Madelene Sagström	(United States) John Ritenour and Valli Ritenour	(United States) Ally McDonald
2015	(United States) Annie Park	(United States) Annie Park	(United States) Walt Lincer	(United States) Casey Grice
2014	(United States) Marissa Steen	(Chinese Taipei) Min Lee	(United States) Mike Vadala	(South Korea) Min Seo Kwak
2013	(Thailand) P.K. Kongkraphan	(Italy) Giulia Molinaro	(South Korea) Kyung Ahn Moon	(United States) Melissa Eaton
2012	(United States) Esther Choe	(South Korea) Mi Hyang Lee	(United States) Zayra Calderon	(United States) Nicole Jeray
2011	(United States) Kathleen Ekey	(United States) Sydnee Michaels	—N/a	(Canada) Izzy Beisiegel
2010	(United States) Cindy LaCrosse	(United States) (South Korea) Jennifer Song	Executive Women's Golf Association	(United States) Mo Martin
2009	(United States) Mina Harigae	(United States) Mina Harigae	(United States) Renee Powell	(United States) Malinda Johnson
2008	(United States) Vicky Hurst	(United States) Vicky Hurst	(Canada) Jocelyne Bourassa	(United States) Katie Fraley
2007	(United States) Emily Bastel	(Mexico) Violeta Retamoza	(United States) Cynthia Rihm	(United States) Jenny Hansen
2006	(South Korea) Song-Hee Kim	(South Korea) Song-Hee Kim	(Australia) Sherrin Smyers	(United States) Katie Connelly
2005	(South Korea) Seon-Hwa Lee	(South Korea) Sun Young Yoo	(Australia) Karrie Webb	(Canada) Salimah Mussani
2004	(South Korea) Jimin Kang	(South Korea) Aram Cho	(United States) Decatur, Illinois Women's Committees	(Australia) Lindsey Wright
2003	(United States) Stacy Prammanasudh	(South Korea) Soo Young Moon	(United States) Wilma Gilliland	(Canada) Heather Wilbur
2002	(Mexico) Lorena Ochoa	(Mexico) Lorena Ochoa	(United States) Bob Hirschman and Connie Shorb	
2001	(United States) Beth Bauer	(United States) Beth Bauer	(United States) Diane Lewis	
2000	(United States) Heather Zakhar	(United States) Jamie Hullett	(United States) Betty Puskar	
1999	(South Korea) Grace Park		(United States) Lew Williams	
1998	(United States) Michelle Bell			
1997	(United States) Marilyn Lovander			
1996	(United States) Vickie Moran			
1995	(United States) Patty Ehrhart			
1994	(United States) Marilyn Lovander			
1993	(United States) Nanci Bowen			
1992	(United States) Jodi Figley			
1991	(United States) Kim Williams			
1990	(United States) Denise Baldwin			
1989	(United States) Jennifer MacCurrach			
1988	(Peru) (Sweden) Jenny Lidback			
1987	(United States) Laurel Kean			
1986	(United States) Tammie Green			
1985	(United States) Tammie Green			
1984	(United States) Penny Hammel			

== The Big Break ==
Many of the contestants on The Golf Channel's The Big Break III: Ladies Only, which aired in the Spring of 2005, played on the Futures Tour, including Danielle Amiee, who ended up being the show's overall champion. The other players from the show that played on the Futures Tour were Jan Dowling, Valeria Ochoa, runner-up Pamela Crikelair, and LPGA veteran Cindy Miller. Show co-host Stephanie Sparks played on the Futures Tour from 1996 to 1999.

The Big Break V: Hawaii, which aired in the spring of 2006, included six additional Futures Tour competitors: Dana Lacey, Ashley Prange, Kim Lewellen, Kristina Tucker, Becky Lucidi and Jeanne Cho. Prange won the competition; Cho was runner-up.

The Big Break VI: Trump National, broadcast in the fall of 2006, included six more Futures Tour players: Rachel Bailey, the individual winner of the 2002 Sunbelt Conference Championship at New Mexico State University; Bridget Dwyer, a member of the 2004 NCAA Women's Golf Championship winning team at UCLA; Ashley Gomes, the 2004 WAC Player of the Year and individual winner of the 2004 WAC Championship while at San Jose State University; Sarah Lynn Johnston, the 2004 Southern Conference Player of the Year and individual winner of the 2004 Southern Conference Championship while at Furman University; Kristy McPherson, a three-time NCAA All-American First Team selection and two-time individual winner of the SEC Championship while at The University of South Carolina; and Briana Vega, who holds North Carolina State University's scoring records for 18-holes (68) and 54-holes (216).

== See also ==
- Cactus Tour, lower-level women's tour in American Southwest
