= 2027 Epson Tour =

Golf tour season

The 2027 Epson Tour is a series of professional women's golf tournaments held from March through October 2027 in the United States. The Epson Tour is the second-tier women's professional golf tour in the United States and is the "official developmental tour" of the LPGA Tour. It was most recently known as the Symetra Tour.

== Changes for 2027 ==
The number of tournaments was extended from 19 to 20 and the total prize money increased from $4.7 million to a record $5.06 million. The Carlisle Championship, the Evansville Championship, Zehnder's Championship and the Constellation Classic were added to the schedule, while the Copper Rock Championship, Carlisle Arizona Women's Golf Classic and the Guardian Championship dropped out.

== Schedule and results ==
The number in parentheses after winners' names show the player's total number of official money, individual event wins on the Epson Tour including that event.

Date	Tournament	Location	Winner	WWGR points	Purse ($)
Mar 6	Reliance Matrix Atlantic Beach Classic	Florida			250,000
Mar 13	Constellation Classic	Florida			250,000
Mar 21	IOA Golf Classic	Florida			200,000
Mar 27	Orlando Health Championship	Florida			250,000
Apr 18	Carlisle Championship				400,000
Apr 25	IOA Championship	California			200,000
May 1	Reliance Matrix Championship	Nevada			250,000
May 22	Evansville Championship	Indiana			250,000
Jun 13	FireKeepers Casino Hotel Championship	Michigan			200,000
Jun 20	Grand Traverse Championship at the Bear	Michigan			250,000
Jun 27	Island Resort Championship	Michigan			235,000
Jul 3	Zehnder's Championship	Michigan			250,000
Jul 18	Hartford HealthCare Women's Championship	Connecticut			275,000
Jul 25	Greater Toledo Classic	Ohio			250,000
Aug 1	Four Winds Invitational	Indiana			225,000
Aug 21	Smoky Mountain Championship	Tennessee			250,000
Aug 29	Wildhorse Ladies Golf Classic	Oregon			250,000
Sep 11	Dream First Bank Charity Classic	Kansas			225,000
Sep 19	Murphy USA El Dorado Shootout	Arkansas			300,000
Oct 3	Epson Tour Championship	California			300,000

== See also ==
- 2027 LPGA Tour
