= 2024 Epson Tour =

Golf tour season

The 2024 Epson Tour was a series of professional women's golf tournaments held from March through October 2024 in the United States. The Epson Tour is the second-tier women's professional golf tour in the United States and is the "official developmental tour" of the LPGA Tour. It was most recently known as the Symetra Tour.

== Changes for 2024 ==
The number of tournaments were reduced from 22 to 19 while total prize money remained at $5 million. Inaugural events were the Atlantic Beach Classic and Otter Creek Championship, while the Black Desert Resort Championship, French Lick Charity Championship, Circling Raven Championship, Inova Mission Inn Resort & Club Championship and Champions Fore Change Invitational were removed from the schedule.

== Schedule and results ==
The number in parentheses after winners' names show the player's total number of official money, individual event wins on the Epson Tour including that event.

Date	Tournament	Location	Winner	WWGR points	Purse ($)
Mar 10	Florida's Natural Charity Classic	Florida	(Colombia) Valery Plata (1)	5	250,000
Mar 17	IOA Golf Classic	Florida	(Chinese Taipei) Jessica Peng (1)	5	200,000
Mar 23	Atlantic Beach Classic	Florida	(United States) Briana Chacon (1)	5	300,000
Apr 28	IOA Championship	California	(Chinese Taipei) Juliana Hung (1)	5	200,000
May 4	Casino Del Sol Golf Classic	Arizona	(United States) Madison Young (1)	6	250,000
May 12	Carlisle Arizona Women's Golf Classic	Arizona	(China) Ruixin Liu (7)	6	400,000
May 18	Copper Rock Championship	Utah	(New Zealand) Fiona Xu (1)	5	250,000
Jun 9	FireKeepers Casino Hotel Championship	Michigan	(Australia) Cassie Porter (1)	4	200,000
Jun 16	Otter Creek Championship	Indiana	(United States) Savannah Vilaubi (2)	5	300,000
Jun 23	Island Resort Championship	Michigan	(South Korea) Joo Soo-bin (1)	6	262,500
Jun 30	Dream First Bank Charity Classic	Kansas	(United States) Kathleen Scavo (1)	4	237,500
Jul 14	Hartford HealthCare Women's Championship	Connecticut	(United States) Daniela Iacobelli (5)	6	262,500
Jul 21	Twin Bridges Championship	New York	(United States) Lauren Stephenson (1)	5	237,500
Aug 18	Wildhorse Ladies Golf Classic	Oregon	(Thailand) Pornanong Phatlum (1)	6	262,500
Sep 1	Four Winds Invitational	Indiana	(China) Zhang Yahui (1)	5	262,500
Sep 8	Guardian Championship	Alabama	(Spain) Fátima Fernández Cano (3)	6	262,500
Sep 15	Tuscaloosa Toyota Classic	Alabama	(Sweden) Ingrid Lindblad (1)	6	237,500
Sep 22	Murphy USA El Dorado Shootout	Arkansas	(United States) Jenny Bae (3)	5	337,500
Oct 6	Epson Tour Championship	California	(Chinese Taipei) Heather Lin (1)	6	287,500

== Race for the Card ==
The top 15 under a new points-based Race for the Card at the end of the season, up from 10 in 2023, gained fully exempt cards on the LPGA Tour for the 2025 season.

Rank	Player	Country	Events	Points
1	Lauren Stephenson	United States	15	1,732
2	Zhang Yahui	China	15	1,534
3	Fátima Fernández Cano	Spain	14	1,455
4	Jessica Porvasnik	United States	19	1,438
5	Brooke Matthews	United States	18	1,313
6	Ingrid Lindblad	Sweden	9	1,259
7	Jenny Bae	United States	18	1,202
8	Fiona Xu	New Zealand	17	1,199
9	Madison Young	United States	18	1,154
10	Cassie Porter	Australia	17	1,133
11	Ana Belac	Slovenia	14	1,131
12	Pornanong Phatlum	Thailand	10	1,112
13	Daniela Iacobelli	United States	19	1,089
14	Miranda Wang	China	18	1,026
15	Heather Lin	Chinese Taipei	19	972

== See also ==
- 2024 LPGA Tour
