= Murphy USA El Dorado Shootout =

Golf tournament in Arkansas

Tournament information
- Location: El Dorado, Arkansas
- Established: 2015
- Course: Mystic Creek Golf Club
- Par: 72
- Length: 6,649 yards (6,080 m)
- Tour: Epson Tour
- Format: Stroke play
- Prize fund: $300,000
- Month played: September

Tournament record score
- Aggregate: 205 Hannah Green (2017); 205 Britney Yada (2022)
- To par: −11 as above

Current champion
- (United States) Kary Hollenbaugh

The Murphy USA El Dorado Shootout is a tournament on the Epson Tour, the LPGA's developmental tour. It has been a part of the tour's schedule since 2015. It is held at Mystic Creek Golf Club in El Dorado, Arkansas.

== Winners ==
Year	Date	Winner	Country	Score	Margin of victory	Runner(s)-up	Purse ($)	Winner's share ($)
2026	Sep 20	Kary Hollenbaugh	United States	210 (−6)	Playoff	(South Korea) Juniper Jang (United States) Kate Smith-Stroh	300,000	45,000
2025	Sep 21	Erica Shepherd	United States	212 (−4)	1 stroke	(United States) Rachel Kuehn (South Africa) Kaleigh Telfer (China) Zeng Liqi	300,000	45,000
2024	Sep 22	Jenny Bae	United States	209 (−7)	1 stroke	(United States) Therese Warner (United States) Lauren Stephenson (United States) Hailee Cooper	337,500	50,625
2023	Sep 24	Natasha Andrea Oon	Malaysia	206 (−10)	3 strokes	(United States) Carley Cox (Australia) Robyn Choi	225,000	33,750
2022	Sep 25	Britney Yada	United States	205 (−11)	2 strokes	(United States) Bailey Tardy	225,000	33,750
2021	Sep 26	Park Kum-kang	South Korea	211 (−5)	2 strokes	(Spain) Fátima Fernández Cano (South Korea) Hong Yaeeun (United States) Lilia Vu	175,000	26,250
2020	No tournament							
2019	Apr 28	Cydney Clanton	United States	214 (−2)	Playoff	(Paraguay) Julieta Granada	150,000	22,500
2018	Sep 16	Kim Hye-min	South Korea	211 (−5)	3 strokes	(United States) Brittany Benvenuto	150,000	22,500
2017	Sep 17	Hannah Green	Australia	205 (−11)	1 stroke	(France) Céline Boutier	100,000	15,000
2016	Oct 2	Madelene Sagström	Sweden	209 (−7)	2 strokes	(United States) Becca Huffer (Canada) Augusta James	100,000	15,000
2015	Sep 27	Jackie Stoelting (a)	United States	213 (−3)	3 strokes	(United States) Ally McDonald (a)	100,000	15,000
