= Jenny Bae (golfer) =

American professional golfer (born 2001)

Personal information
- Nationality: United States
- Born: August 25, 2001 (age 25) Suwanee, Georgia, U.S.
- Height: 5 ft 3 in (160 cm)

Career
- Sport: Golf
- College: University of Georgia
- Turned professional: 2023
- Current tour: LPGA Tour (joined 2025)
- Former tour: Epson Tour (joined 2023)
- Professional wins: 3

Number of wins by tour
- Epson Tour: 3

Best results in LPGA major championships
- Chevron Championship: T27: 2026
- Women's PGA C'ship: T47: 2025
- U.S. Women's Open: CUT: 2026
- Women's British Open: CUT: 2025, 2026
- Evian Championship: T41: 2026

Achievements and awards
- Inkster Award: 2023

Jenny Bae (born August 25, 2001) is an American professional golfer and LPGA Tour player.

== Amateur career ==
Bae was born in Suwanee, Georgia. She won the 2018 Georgia Junior Championship in record-setting fashion, shooting a 9-under 207 to win by 10 strokes. She was named the 2018 Georgia Player of the Year as a junior, after earning medalist honors at the state championships representing Collins Hill High School.

Bae played her college golf at the University of Georgia from January 2019 to 2023. In her final season she was named first-team All-American and was ranked ranked 5th by GolfStat and Golfweek. She received the Juli Inkster Award as the top female collegiate golfer, and was a finalist for the Annika Award, the WGCA Ping National Player of the Year, and the Honda Sports Award.

In 2023, she lost a playoff to Rose Zhang at the Augusta National Women's Amateur.

== Professional career ==
Bae turned professional after graduating in 2023 and joined the Epson Tour, where she won two events back-to-back in her second and third starts. She made her LPGA debut at the 2023 Portland Classic.

In 2024, she won her third title at the Murphy USA El Dorado Shootout, and finished 7th on the Race for the Card at the end of the season, to gain a fully exempt card on the LPGA Tour for the 2025 season.

== Amateur wins ==
- 2018 Georgia Junior Championship
- 2020 Georgia Women's Match Play Championship
- 2021 NCAA Columbus Regional, Georgia Women's Amateur Championship
- 2022 Illini Women's Invitational
- 2023 NCAA Athens Regional

== Professional wins (3) ==
=== Epson Tour wins (3) ===
No.	Date	Tournament	Winning score	To par	Margin of victory	Runner(s)-up	Winner's share ($)
1	Jul 16, 2023	Hartford HealthCare Women's Championship	69-66-70=205	−11	Playoff	(Taiwan) Ssu-Chia Cheng (South Korea) Kang Min-ji	30,000
2	Jul 23, 2023	Twin Bridges Championship	65-69-73=207	−6	Playoff	(United States) Jessica Porvasnik	30,000
3	Sep 22, 2024	Murphy USA El Dorado Shootout	66-70-73=209	−7	1 stroke	(United States) Therese Warner (United States) Lauren Stephenson (United States) Hailee Cooper	50,625

== Results in LPGA majors ==
Tournament	2025	2026
Chevron Championship	CUT	T27
U.S. Women's Open		CUT
Women's PGA Championship	T47	CUT
The Evian Championship	T59	T41
Women's British Open	CUT	CUT

Did not play

CUT = missed the half-way cut
T = tied
