= 2026 Epson Tour =

Golf tour season

The 2026 Epson Tour was a series of professional women's golf tournaments held from March through October 2026 in the United States. The Epson Tour is the second-tier women's professional golf tour in the United States and is the "official developmental tour" of the LPGA Tour. It was most recently known as the Symetra Tour.

== Changes for 2026 ==
The number of tournaments was reduced from 20 to 19 and the total prize money reduced from $5 million to $4.7 million. The Otter Creek Championship in Indiana and the Casella Golf Championship in New York left the schedule, and the Smoky Mountain Championship in Tennessee was added. The Central Florida Championship became the Orlando Health Championship after gaining a title sponsor.

== Schedule and results ==
The number in parentheses after winners' names show the player's total number of official money, individual event wins on the Epson Tour including that event.

| Date | Tournament | Location | Winner | WWGR points | Purse ($) |
|---|---|---|---|---|---|
| Mar 7 | Atlantic Beach Classic | Florida | (Mexico) Isabella Fierro (2) | 4.0 | 250,000 |
| Mar 15 | IOA Golf Classic | Florida | (South Korea) Lee Jeong-eun (1) | 3.6 | 200,000 |
| Mar 22 | Orlando Health Championship | Florida | (United States) Maddie McCrary (1) | 3.0 | 250,000 |
| Apr 26 | IOA Championship | California | (United States) Amari Avery (1) | 3.7 | 200,000 |
| May 3 | Carlisle Arizona Women's Golf Classic | Arizona | (United States) Megan Schofill (1) | 6.0 | 400,000 |
| May 10 | Reliance Matrix Championship | Nevada | (Thailand) Cholcheva Wongras (1) | 3.3 | 250,000 |
| May 16 | Copper Rock Championship | Utah | (New Zealand) Fiona Xu (2) | 3.1 | 250,000 |
| Jun 14 | FireKeepers Casino Hotel Championship | Michigan | (United States) Lauryn Nguyen (1) | 3.3 | 200,000 |
| Jun 21 | Great Lakes Championship | Michigan | (Mexico) Lauren Olivares (1) | 3.4 | 250,000 |
| Jun 28 | Island Resort Championship | Michigan | (United States) Kaleiya Romero (1) | 3.2 | 225,000 |
| Jul 12 | Four Winds Invitational | Indiana | (United States) Haylee Harford Sanchez (1) | 3.7 | 225,000 |
| Jul 19 | Greater Toledo Classic | Ohio | (United States) Annabelle Pancake-Webb (1) | 4.1 | 250,000 |
| Jul 26 | Hartford HealthCare Women's Championship | Connecticut | (United States) Christine Wang (1) | 4.4 | 250,000 |
| Aug 8 | Smoky Mountain Championship | Tennessee | (Malaysia) Mirabel Ting (1) | 3.7 | 250,000 |
| Aug 23 | Wildhorse Ladies Golf Classic | Oregon | (United States) Megha Ganne (1) | 3.6 | 250,000 |
| Aug 30 | Dream First Bank Charity Classic | Kansas | (Malaysia) Mirabel Ting (2) | 3.4 | 200,000 |
| Sep 13 | Guardian Championship | Alabama | (Spain) Carla Bernat (1) | 3.7 | 250,000 |
| Sep 20 | Murphy USA El Dorado Shootout | Arkansas | (United States) Kary Hollenbaugh (1) | 4.1 | 300,000 |
| Oct 4 | Epson Tour Championship | California | (United States) Reagan Zibilski (1) | 3.6 | 250,000 |

== Race for the Card ==
The top 15 under a points-based ranking gain fully exempt cards on the LPGA Tour for the 2027 season.

| Rank | Player | Country | Events | Points |
|---|---|---|---|---|
| 1 | Mirabel Ting | Malaysia | 19 | 2,778 |
| 2 | Lauren Olivares | Mexico | 19 | 2,280 |
| 3 | Kaleiya Romero | United States | 19 | 2,141 |
| 4 | Annabelle Pancake-Webb | United States | 19 | 1,760 |
| 5 | Carla Bernat | Spain | 18 | 1,626 |
| 6 | Cholcheva Wongras | Thailand | 16 | 1,507 |
| 7 | Zeng Liqi | China | 19 | 1,409 |
| 8 | Amari Avery | United States | 17 | 1,403 |
| 9 | Mariel Galdiano | United States | 16 | 1,318 |
| 10 | Reagan Zibilski | United States | 11 | 1,143 |
| 11 | Rachel Kuehn | United States | 19 | 1,079 |
| 12 | Megha Ganne | United States | 11 | 1,065 |
| 13 | Lauryn Nguyen | United States | 17 | 1,030 |
| 14 | Megan Schofill | United States | 19 | 970 |
| 15 | Samantha Wagner | United States | 18 | 943 |

== Awards ==
- Player of the Year, player who leads the rankings at the end of the season
  - (Malaysia) Mirabel Ting
- Rookie of the Year Award, first year player with the highest finish on the official rankings
  - (Malaysia) Mirabel Ting

== See also ==
- 2026 LPGA Tour
