= 2021 Symetra Tour =

The 2021 Symetra Tour was a series of professional women's golf tournaments held from March through October 2021 in the United States. The Symetra Tour is the second-tier women's professional golf tour in the United States and is the "official developmental tour" of the LPGA Tour. It was previously known as the Futures Tour. This was the last season of the tour sponsored by Symetra.

== Schedule and results ==
The number in parentheses after winners' names show the player's total number of official money, individual event wins on the Symetra Tour including that event.

Date	Tournament	Location	Winner	WWGR points	Purse ($)
Mar 21	Carlisle Arizona Women's Golf Classic	Arizona	(China) Ruixin Liu (5)	6	200,000
Mar 28	IOA Championship	California	(Germany) Sophie Hausmann (1)	6	150,000
Apr 18	Casino Del Sol Golf Classic	Arizona	(China) Ruixin Liu (6)	4	200,000
Apr 24	Copper Rock Championship	Utah	(United States) Bailey Tardy (1)	4	200,000
May 2	Garden City Charity Classic	Kansas	(United States) Lilia Vu (1)	3	175,000
May 16	Symetra Classic	North Carolina	(United States) Casey Danielson (1)	4	175,000
May 23	IOA Golf Classic	Florida	(United States) Allison Emrey (1)	3	175,000
May 30	Mission Inn Resort and Club Championship	Florida	(Chinese Taipei) Min Lee (3)	4	200,000
Jun 13	Island Resort Championship	Michigan	(Switzerland) Morgane Métraux (1)	3	200,000
Jun 27	Prasco Charity Championship	Ohio	(England) Meghan MacLaren (1)	3	175,000
Jul 10	Donald Ross Classic	Indiana	(United States) Casey Danielson (2)	6	250,000
Jul 18	Danielle Downey Credit Union Classic	New York	(France) Emma Broze (1)	3	175,000
Jul 25	Twin Bridges Championship	New York	(United States) Lilia Vu (2)	3	175,000
Aug 8	FireKeepers Casino Hotel Championship	Michigan	(Mexico) Fernanda Lira (1)	3	175,000
Aug 15	Four Winds Invitational	Indiana	(United States) Lilia Vu (3)	4	200,000
Aug 29	Circling Raven Championship	Idaho	(Chinese Taipei) Peiyun Chien (3)	3	200,000
Sep 19	Guardian Championship	Alabama	(United States) Janie Jackson (2)	3	175,000
Sep 26	Murphy USA El Dorado Shootout	Arkansas	(South Korea) Park Kum-kang (1)	3	150,000
Oct 3	Carolina Golf Classic	North Carolina	(United States) Sophia Schubert (1)	3	200,000
Oct 10	Symetra Tour Championship	Florida	(Thailand) Prima Thammaraks (1)	3	250,000

== Leading money winners ==
The top ten money winners at the end of the season gained fully exempt cards on the LPGA Tour for the 2022 season.

Rank	Player	Country	Events	Prize money ($)
1	Lilia Vu	United States	18	162,292
2	Fátima Fernández Cano	Spain	20	119,180
3	Casey Danielson	United States	19	114,534
4	Sophia Schubert	United States	20	101,163
5	Ruixin Liu	China	14	95,281
6	Maude-Aimee Leblanc	Canada	17	94,188
7	Amanda Doherty	United States	19	90,921
8	Allison Emrey	United States	20	82,644
9	Morgane Métraux	Switzerland	18	75,771
10	Rachel Rohanna	United States	19	75,608

== See also ==
- 2021 LPGA Tour
- 2021 in golf
