= Forest Oaks, North Carolina =

- Census-designated place
- Location in Guilford County and the state of North Carolina
- Coordinates: 35°59′20″N 79°42′29″W
- Country: United States
- State: North Carolina
- County: Guilford

Area
  - Total: 4.90 sq mi (12.69 km^{2})
  - Land: 4.80 sq mi (12.43 km^{2})
  - Water: 0.10 sq mi (0.26 km^{2})
- Elevation: 774 ft (236 m)

Population (2020)
  - Total: 4,209
  - Density: 877.1/sq mi (338.64/km^{2})
- Time zone: UTC-5 (Eastern (EST))
  - Summer (DST): UTC-4 (EDT)
- ZIP code: 27406
- Area code: 336
- FIPS code: 37-24198
- GNIS feature ID: 2402491

Forest Oaks is a census-designated place (CDP) in Guilford County, North Carolina, United States. As of the 2020 census, Forest Oaks had a population of 4,209.

== Geography ==
Forest Oaks is located in southeastern Guilford County. At the center of the CDP is the Forest Oaks Country Club. The community is 10 miles (16 km) southeast of downtown Greensboro. The town is also known for Southeast Guilford Middle and High Schools, and is bordered to the west by Joseph M. Hunt Highway (U.S. Route 421).

According to the United States Census Bureau, the CDP has a total area of 4.9 square miles (12.8 km^{2}), of which 4.9 square miles (12.6 km^{2}) is land and 0.1 square miles (0.3 km^{2}), or 2.13%, is water. The majority of the CDP drains to Beaver Creek, a northeastward-flowing tributary of Little Alamance Creek and part of the Great Alamance Creek–Haw River–Cape Fear River watershed.

== Demographics ==
Historical population
Census	Pop.	Note	%±
2020	4,209		—
U.S. Decennial Census

=== 2020 census ===
As of the 2020 census, Forest Oaks had a population of 4,209. The median age was 46.6 years. 20.8% of residents were under the age of 18 and 24.0% of residents were 65 years of age or older. For every 100 females there were 96.0 males, and for every 100 females age 18 and over there were 92.2 males age 18 and over.

85.9% of residents lived in urban areas, while 14.1% lived in rural areas.

There were 1,620 households in Forest Oaks, of which 27.8% had children under the age of 18 living in them. Of all households, 65.5% were married-couple households, 11.0% were households with a male householder and no spouse or partner present, and 19.8% were households with a female householder and no spouse or partner present. About 19.3% of all households were made up of individuals and 12.7% had someone living alone who was 65 years of age or older.

There were 1,664 housing units, of which 2.6% were vacant. The homeowner vacancy rate was 0.8% and the rental vacancy rate was 2.8%.

Racial composition as of the 2020 census
Race	Number	Percent
White	3,010	71.5%
Black or African American	842	20.0%
American Indian and Alaska Native	20	0.5%
Asian	51	1.2%
Native Hawaiian and Other Pacific Islander	1	0.0%
Some other race	73	1.7%
Two or more races	212	5.0%
Hispanic or Latino (of any race)	148	3.5%

=== 2000 census ===
As of the 2000 census, there were 3,241 people, 1,227 households, and 1,065 families residing in the CDP. The population density was 638.8 inhabitants per square mile (246.6/km^{2}). There were 1,252 housing units at an average density of 246.8 per square mile (95.3/km^{2}). The racial makeup of the CDP was 94.29% White, 4.54% African American, 0.19% Native American, 0.19% Asian, 0.28% from other races, and 0.52% from two or more races. Hispanic or Latino of any race were 0.34% of the population.

There were 1,227 households, out of which 32.6% had children under the age of 18 living with them, 79.5% were married couples living together, 5.2% had a female householder with no husband present, and 13.2% were non-families. 12.0% of all households were made up of individuals, and 5.3% had someone living alone who was 65 years of age or older. The average household size was 2.64 and the average family size was 2.86.

In the CDP, the population was spread out, with 22.5% under the age of 18, 5.4% from 18 to 24, 23.3% from 25 to 44, 35.2% from 45 to 64, and 13.6% who were 65 years of age or older. The median age was 44 years. For every 100 females, there were 97.6 males. For every 100 females age 18 and over, there were 96.6 males.

The median income for a household in the CDP was $61,827, and the median income for a family was $67,159. Males had a median income of $45,313 versus $29,980 for females. The per capita income for the CDP was $25,682. About 5.2% of families and 4.7% of the population were below the poverty line, including 7.8% of those under age 18 and 3.6% of those age 65 or over.
