= Robyn Choi =

Australian professional golfer (born 1998)

Personal information
- Nationality: Australia
- Born: 17 March 1998 (age 28) Sydney, Australia
- Height: 5 ft 7 in (170 cm)

Career
- Sport: Golf
- College: University of Colorado Boulder
- Turned professional: 2018
- Current tours: LPGA Tour (joined 2019); WPGA Tour of Australasia
- Former tour: Epson Tour (joined 2020)
- Professional wins: 1

Number of wins by tour
- WPGA Tour of Australasia: 1

Best results in LPGA major championships
- Chevron Championship: T54: 2024
- Women's PGA C'ship: T48: 2026
- U.S. Women's Open: CUT: 2017, 2018
- Women's British Open: T47: 2026
- Evian Championship: CUT: 2025, 2026

Robyn Choi (born 17 March 1998) is an Australian professional golfer and LPGA Tour player.

== Early life and amateur career ==
Choi was born in Sydney to Korean parents, and grew up in Gold Coast, Queensland. She won the Queensland Amateur Championship in 2015 and 2016, and reached the semi-finals of the 2015 Australian Women's Amateur. She finished 3rd at 2018 the Australian Master of the Amateurs.

Choi represented Australia at the 2016 Queen Sirikit Cup where the team finished second behind Korea, and the 2016 Espirito Santo Trophy, alongside Karis Davidson and Hannah Green.

After graduating from Benowa State High School, Choi played college golf at the University of Colorado Boulder with the Colorado Buffaloes women's golf team for two and a half years 2016−2018, where she was named co-MVP and All-American.

She qualified for both the 2017 and 2018 U.S. Women's Open, where she missed the cut.

== Professional career ==
Choi turned professional after she obtained a card at the LPGA Tour Q School in November 2018 by finishing tied 45th. She joined the 2019 LPGA Tour and in her rookie season played in 12 events and made three cuts. Playing in the 2020 ISPS Handa Vic Open she finished in a tie for 6th.

In 2020, she played mainly on the Epson Tour, where she was runner-up at the Four Winds Invitational, a stroke behind Kim Kaufman, and finished 13th in the rankings. In 2021, her season-best result was a solo 3rd place at the Four Winds Invitational, behind Lilia Vu and Ruixin Liu. She was runner-up at the 2022 Circling Raven Championship, and at the 2023 Murphy USA El Dorado Shootout, behind Natasha Oon.

In 2023, playing on the WPGA Tour of Australasia, she was the leading woman at the Webex Players Series South Australia.

Choi earned her card for the 2024 LPGA Tour through qualifying school, where she was the medalist, outpacing runner-up Mao Saigo by three strokes.

== Amateur wins ==
- 2015 Katherine Kirk Classic, Queensland Amateur Championship, Queensland Girls Amateur, Greg Norman Junior Masters
- 2016 Queensland Amateur Championship

== Professional wins (1) ==
=== WPGA Tour of Australasia wins (1) ===
No.	Date	Tournament	Winning score	To par	Runner-up
1	22 Oct 2023	Webex Players Series South Australia	67-68-70-71=276	−4	(Australia) Emma Ash

== Results in LPGA majors ==
Results not in chronological order.

Tournament	2017	2018	2019	2020	2021	2022	2023	2024	2025	2026
Chevron Championship								T54		CUT
U.S. Women's Open	CUT	CUT								
Women's PGA Championship								CUT	CUT	T48
The Evian Championship				NT					CUT	CUT
Women's British Open										T47

Did not play

CUT = missed the half-way cut
NT = no tournament
T = tied

== Team appearances ==
Amateur

- Queen Sirikit Cup (representing Australia): 2016
- Espirito Santo Trophy (representing Australia): 2016
