= Four Winds Invitational =

Golf tournament in Indiana

Tournament information
- Location: South Bend, Indiana
- Established: 2012
- Course: Blackthorn Golf Club
- Par: 72
- Length: 6,674 yards (6,103 m)
- Tour: Epson Tour
- Format: Stroke play
- Prize fund: $225,000
- Month played: July

Current champion
- (United States) Haylee Harford Sanchez

The Four Winds Invitational is a tournament on the Epson Tour, the LPGA's developmental tour. It has been a part of the tour's schedule since 2012. The tournament was held at Blackthorn Golf Club in South Bend, Indiana from 2012 to 2020 and again in 2026. It was held at South Bend Country Club from 2021 to 2025.

In 2020, the tournament was postponed due to the COVID-19 pandemic.

== Winners ==
Year	Date	Winner	Country	Score	Margin of victory	Runner(s)-up	Purse ($)	Winner's share ($)
2026	Jul 12	Haylee Harford Sanchez	United States	201 (−15)	2 strokes	(South Africa) Megan Streicher	225,000	33,750
2025	Aug 3	Leah John	Canada	207 (−9)	1 stroke	(United States) Jennifer Chang (United States) Melanie Green	225,000	33,750
2024	Sep 1	Zhang Yahui	China	210 (−6)	1 stroke	(Spain) Fátima Fernández Cano (United States) Lauren Stephenson	262,500	39,375
2023	Aug 12	Gabriela Ruffels	Australia	204 (−12)	3 strokes	(United States) Becca Huffer (United States) Katherine Smith	200,000	30,000
2022	Aug 14	Liu Yan	China	209 (−7)	Playoff	(United States) Gabby Lemieux (Finland) Kiira Riihijarvi	200,000	30,000
2021	Aug 15	Lilia Vu	United States	204 (−12)	2 strokes	(China) Riuxin Liu	200,000	30,000
2020	Sep 6 (Note: Tournament rescheduled from Jun 12–14.)	Kim Kaufman	United States	205 (−11)	1 stroke	(Australia) Robyn Choi	150,000	22,500
2019	Jun 9	Perrine Delacour	France	207 (−9)	2 strokes	(United States) Jillian Hollis	150,000	22,500
2018	Jun 10	Maia Schechter	United States	205 (−11)	1 stroke	(South Korea) Seong Eun-jeong (Sweden) Louise Stahle	150,000	22,500
2017	Jun 11	Kendall Dye	United States	205 (−11)	3 strokes	(France) Céline Boutier (United States) Elizabeth Szokol	150,000	22,500
2016	Jun 19	Jackie Stoelting	United States	209 (−7)	1 stroke	(United States) Ally McDonald	150,000	22,500
2015	Jun 21	Brooke Henderson	Canada	206 (−10)	3 strokes	(United States) Salanee Henderson (Italy) Giulia Molinaro (Canada) Jessica Wallace	150,000	22,500
2014	Jun 22	Nicole Vandermade	Canada	204 (−12)	1 stroke	(United States) Lee Lopez	150,000	22,500
2013	Jun 23	Cydney Clanton	United States	208 (−8)	Playoff	(United States) Marina Alex (United States) Marissa Steen	150,000	22,500
2012	Aug 12	Julia Boland	Australia	212 (−4)	1 stroke	(South Korea) Birdie Kim (United States) Jenny Suh	150,000	22,500
