= Island Resort Championship =

Golf tournament in Michigan

Tournament information
- Location: Harris, Michigan
- Established: 2011
- Course: Sweetgrass Golf Club
- Par: 72
- Length: 6,572 yards (6,009 m)
- Tour: Epson Tour
- Format: Stroke play
- Prize fund: $225,000
- Month played: June

Tournament record score
- Aggregate: 199 Morgane Metraux (2021); 199 Ssu-Chia Cheng (2022)
- To par: −17 as above

Current champion
- (United States) Kaleiya Romero

The Island Resort Championship is a tournament on the Epson Tour (formerly known as the Symetra Tour), the LPGA's developmental tour. It has been a part of the tour's schedule since 2011. It is held at Sweetgrass Golf Club in Harris, Michigan.

The 2020 tournament was cancelled due to the COVID-19 pandemic.

== Winners ==
Year	Date	Winner	Country	Score	Margin of victory	Runner(s)-up	Purse ($)	Winner's share ($)
2026	Jun 28	Kaleiya Romero	United States	200 (−16)	Playoff	(China) Zeng Liqi	225,000	33,750
2025	Jun 22	Melanie Green	United States	202 (−14)	2 strokes	(United States) Katie Smith-Stroh	225,000	33,750
2024	Jun 23	Joo Soo-bin	South Korea	136 (−8) (Note: Reduced to 36 holes due to weather)	1 stroke	(Japan) Saki Baba (United States) Kim Kaufman (Sweden) Ingrid Lindblad (South Africa) Kaleigh Telfer (Puerto Rico) Maria Torres	262,500	39,375
2023	Jun 25	Tseng Tsai-ching	Chinese Taipei	201 (−15)	1 stroke	(United States) Auston Kim (Malaysia) Natasha Andrea Oon	225,000	33,750
2022	Jun 26	Ssu-Chia Cheng	Chinese Taipei	199 (−17)	6 strokes	(South Korea) Jeon Ji-won	212,500	31,875
2021	Jun 13	Morgane Métraux	Switzerland	199 (−17)	1 stroke	(Canada) Maude-Aimee Leblanc	200,000	30,000
2020	Jun 21	Tournament cancelled					200,000	30,000
2019	Jun 23	Daniela Iacobelli	United States	205 (−11)	Playoff	(United States) Cindy Ha	200,000	30,000
2018	Jun 26	Ruixin Liu	China	207 (−9)	1 stroke	(United States) Lori Beth Adams (South Korea) Min Seo Kwak	175,000	26,250
2017	Jun 25	Emma Talley	United States	135 (−9)	3 strokes	(China) Ruixin Liu (Thailand) Benyapa Niphatsophon	150,000	22,500
2016	Jun 26	Sherman Santiwiwatthanaphong	Thailand	210 (−6)	2 strokes	(Chinese Taipei) Pei-Yun Chien (Sweden) Madelene Sagström (United States) Jackie Stoelting	125,000	18,750
2015	Jun 28	Daniela Holmqvist	Sweden	206 (−10)	1 stroke	(Canada) Samantha Richdale	125,000	18,750
2014	Jun 29	Molly Aronsson	United States	215 (−1)	1 stroke	(United States) Sadena Parks	125,000	18,750
2013	Jun 30	Kim Kaufman	United States	213 (−3)	Playoff	(Japan) Mitsuki Katahira	115,000	17,250
2012	Jul 1	Leah Wigger	United States	209 (−7)	3 strokes	(United States) Victoria Park	110,000	16,500
2011	Jun 26	Stephanie Kim	United States	209 (−7)	2 strokes	(United States) Jane Rah	100,000	15,000
