= Maude-Aimée LeBlanc =

Canadian professional golfer (born 1997)

Personal information
- Nationality: Canada
- Born: 14 February 1989 (age 37) Sherbrooke, Quebec, Canada
- Height: 6 ft 1 in (1.85 m)

Career
- Sport: Golf
- College: Purdue University
- Turned professional: 2011
- Current tour: LPGA Tour (joined 2012)
- Former tour: Symetra Tour

Best results in LPGA major championships
- Chevron Championship: CUT: 2017, 2022, 2023
- Women's PGA C'ship: T31: 2018
- U.S. Women's Open: T26: 2016
- Women's British Open: 69th: 2016
- Evian Championship: 63rd: 2016

Achievements and awards
- Big Ten Freshman of the Year: 2008
- Mary Fossum Award: 2010

Maude-Aimée LeBlanc (born 14 February 1989) is a Canadian professional golfer and LPGA Tour player.

== Early years, education and amateur career ==
LeBlanc was born in Sherbrooke, Quebec and started playing in golf tournaments at age 9. She was a member of the Canadian National Team for six years and participated in the Canadian Women's Open as an amateur in 2006, 2008 and 2009, notably paired with fellow teenager Michelle Wie in 2008.

She represented Canada at the 2008 Espirito Santo Trophy in Adelaide, Australia, helping her team to a fourth-place finish and finishing fourth individually, 8 strokes behind Caroline Hedwall. She reached the quarterfinals of the British Ladies Amateur in Scotland, and finished fourth at the Canadian Women's Amateur.

LeBlanc enrolled at Purdue University in 2007 as a psychology major and played with the Purdue Boilermakers women's golf team, alongside Paula Reto and Laura Gonzalez Escallon. She was named Big Ten Freshman of the Year. As a junior, she earned the Mary Fossum Award for lowest stroke average in the Big Ten Conference, and led Purdue to victory in the 2010 NCAA Division I Women's Golf Championships.

== Professional career ==
LeBlanc turned professional in June 2011. She finished tied for 7th at the LPGA Final Qualifying Tournament, and joined the LPGA Tour for the 2012 season. In her rookie season, she led the tour in driving distance with an average of 282.6 yards.

In 2016, she tied for 26th at the 2016 U.S. Women's Open, and in 2017 she finished tied 7th ISPS Handa Women's Australian Open, again leading the tour in average driving distance with 279.26 yards.

Struggling to fully establish herself on the LPGA Tour after sustaining a back injury in 2012, LeBlanc also played on the Symetra Tour, where she was runner-up at the 2015 Guardian Retirement Championship and the 2019 The CDPHP Open.

On the 2021 Symetra Tour, she was runner-up at the IOA Championship, Copper Rock Championship and Island Resort Championship to finish sixth on the Race for the Card money list and earn LPGA Tour membership for 2022.

On the 2022 LPGA Tour, she recorded three top-10 finishes, including a tie for 4th at the JTBC Classic. She finished tied 8th at the Women's Scottish Open after starting the day a stroke behind leaders Céline Boutier and Lydia Ko, and playing in the final group on the last day of the tournament.

A year ahead of the 2024 Summer Olympics, LeBlanc sat second in the qualification rankings for Canada, on course to represent her country alongside Brooke Henderson, but ultimately lost the spot to Alena Sharp.

In December 2025 LeBlanc secured her card for the 2026 LPGA Tour at Q-Series.

== Amateur wins ==
- 2006 Pacific Junior Championship, Quebec Junior Championship, Royal Canadian Junior Championship, Junior Orange Bowl International
- 2007 Quebec Amateur Championship, Quebec Junior Championship
- 2008 Quebec Amateur Championship
- 2009 Big Ten Championship (tied), Ladies Midwest Shootout
- 2010 Lady Northern Invitational, Windy City Collegiate

== Results in LPGA majors ==
Results not in chronological order.

Tournament	2012	2013	2014	2015	2016	2017	2018	2019	2020	2021	2022	2023	2024	2025	2026
Chevron Championship						CUT					CUT	CUT			
U.S. Women's Open		T50			T26						70		T58		
Women's PGA Championship	T36	WD			T58		T31				T71				CUT
The Evian Championship^					63				NT		CUT				
Women's British Open					69						CUT				

^ The Evian Championship was added as a major in 2013

Did not play

CUT = missed the half-way cut
WD = withdrew
NT = no tournament
T = tied

=== Summary ===
Tournament	Wins	2nd	3rd	Top-5	Top-10	Top-25	Events	Cuts made
Chevron Championship	0	0	0	0	0	0	3	0
U.S. Women's Open	0	0	0	0	0	0	4	4
Women's PGA Championship	0	0	0	0	0	0	6	4
The Evian Championship	0	0	0	0	0	0	2	1
Women's British Open	0	0	0	0	0	0	2	1
Totals	0	0	0	0	0	0	17	10

- Most consecutive cuts made – 5 (2015 U.S. Women's Open – 2016 Evian Championship)

== Team appearances ==
Amateur

- Espirito Santo Trophy (representing Canada): 2008
