= 2018 Symetra Tour =

The 2018 Symetra Tour was a series of professional women's golf tournaments held from March through October 2018 in the United States. The Symetra Tour is the second-tier women's professional golf tour in the United States and is the "official developmental tour" of the LPGA Tour. It was previously known as the Futures Tour.

== Schedule and results ==
The number in parentheses after winners' names show the player's total number of official money, individual event wins on the Symetra Tour including that event.

Date	Tournament	Location	Winner	WWGR points	Purse ($)
Mar 18	Florida's Natural Charity Classic	Florida	(United States) Lauren Kim (1)	3	125,000
Apr 8	IOA Championship	California	(Northern Ireland) Stephanie Meadow (1)	4	100,000
May 6	IOA Invitational	Georgia	(United States) Elizabeth Szokol (1)	4	100,000
May 13	Self Regional Healthcare Foundation Women's Health Classic	South Carolina	(United States) Vicky Hurst (8)	4	200,000
May 19	Symetra Classic	North Carolina	(Sweden) Jenny Haglund (1)	4	175,000
May 26	Valley Forge Invitational	Pennsylvania	(Sweden) Louise Ridderström (1)	3	100,000
Jun 10	Four Winds Invitational	Indiana	(United States) Maia Schechter (1)	3	150,000
Jun 17	Forsyth Classic	Illinois	(Germany) Isi Gabsa (1)	3	130,000
Jun 24	Island Resort Championship	Michigan	(China) Ruixin Liu (1)	4	150,000
Jul 1	Prasco Charity Championship	Ohio	(China) Muni He (1)	3	100,000
Jul 14	Donald Ross Classic	Indiana	(United States) Stephanie Kono (1)	6	200,000
Jul 22	Danielle Downey Credit Union Classic	New York	(South Korea) Seong Eun-jeong (1)	4	150,000
Jul 29	Fuccillo Kia Classic of NY	New York	(United States) Kendall Dye (3)	3	125,000
Aug 12	PHC Classic	Wisconsin	(United States) Lauren Coughlin (1)	4	100,000
Aug 19	FireKeepers Casino Hotel Championship	Michigan	(Spain) Marta Sanz Barrio (1)	4	100,000
Sep 2	Sioux Falls GreatLIFE Challenge	South Dakota	(Sweden) Linnea Ström (1)	4	210,000
Sep 9	Garden City Charity Classic	Kansas	(United States) Allyssa Ferrell (1)	4	150,000
Sep 16	Murphy USA El Dorado Shootout	Arkansas	(South Korea) Kim Hye-min (2)	4	150,000
Sep 23	Guardian Championship	Alabama	(United States) Kendall Dye (4)	4	100,000
Sep 30	IOA Golf Classic	Florida	(China) Ruixin Liu (2)	4	150,000
Oct 7	Symetra Tour Championship	Florida	(China) Ruixin Liu (3)	4	225,000

== Leading money winners ==
The top ten money winners at the end of the season gained fully exempt cards on the LPGA Tour for the 2019 season:

Rank	Player	Country	Events	Prize money ($)
1	Ruixin Liu	China	21	124,839
2	Dottie Ardina	Philippines	17	97,822
3	Pavarisa Yoktuan	Thailand	18	80,313
4	Elizabeth Szokol	United States	20	76,612
5	Linnea Ström	Sweden	20	70,685
6	Stephanie Meadow	England	21	70,617
7	Kendall Dye	United States	13	63,579
8	Charlotte Thomas	England	21	60,952
9	Isi Gabsa	Germany	19	60,386
10	Dana Finkelstein	United States	18	60,168

== See also ==
- 2018 LPGA Tour
- 2018 in golf
