= Lucy Li =

American professional golfer (born 2002)

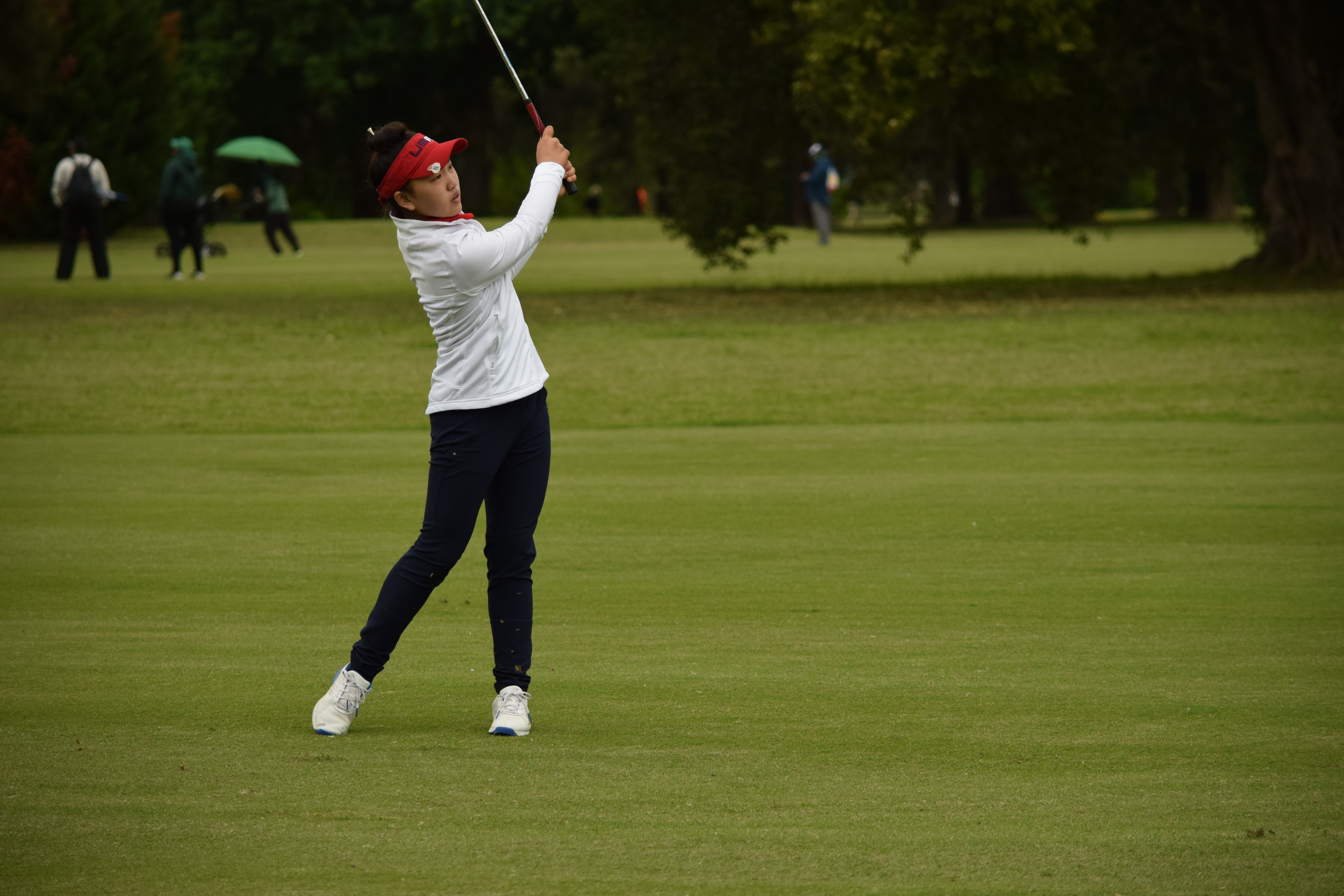
- Li at the 2018 Summer Youth Olympics

Personal information
- Nationality: United States
- Born: October 1, 2002 (age 24) Stanford, California, U.S.
- Height: 5 ft 2 in (157 cm)

Career
- Sport: Golf
- College: University of Pennsylvania
- Turned professional: 2019
- Current tour: LPGA Tour
- Former tour: Epson Tour
- Professional wins: 2

Number of wins by tour
- Epson Tour: 2

Best results in LPGA major championships
- Chevron Championship: T30: 2025
- Women's PGA C'ship: T12: 2025
- U.S. Women's Open: T16: 2021
- Women's British Open: T16: 2026
- Evian Championship: T65: 2025
Medal record
Youth Olympic Games
Silver medal – second place	2018 Buenos Aires	Mixed team

Lucy Li (born October 1, 2002) is an American professional golfer. She holds records as the youngest qualifier for the U.S. Women's Amateur and the U.S. Women's Open, at 11, in 2014. She is the second-youngest qualifier for the U.S. Women's Amateur Public Links, and the youngest ever to advance to match play in that event. Li was an age group winner at the inaugural Masters Drive, Chip, and Putt Championship in Augusta, Georgia. As of 2014, she was a student of Jim McLean.

== Early life ==
In 2002, Li was born in Stanford, California. She lived in Redwood Shores, California, as of 2014. Her father, Warren Li, is a San Francisco Bay Area computer consultant and stockbroker. Her mother, Amy Zeng, is a former Hewlett-Packard employee. Warren and Amy were raised in China and moved to the United States from Australia in 1998. Warren Li has a Ph.D. in computer science, while Amy has a master's degree in the field.

Li took diving lessons at Stanford University and was platform diving from 10 metres (32.8 ft) at age 4. She was also active in gymnastics and music. Some sources claim that she began practicing at Mariners Point Golf Center at about age 4 or 5, with informal coaching from her mother and aunt. Other sources claim that she began playing golf at age 7 while watching her older brother Luke, a Princeton University student, who was hitting balls at a driving range. Li likes to tell the latter story, but Mariners Point head pro Joby Ross confirmed that at about 3 or 4 years old Li was very boisterous about her interest in the sport to the point of throwing tantrums when being asked to leave. At age 7 her parents called Jim McLean, who also coaches or has coached Lexi Thompson, Cristie Kerr, Keegan Bradley and Erik Compton, and arranged a visit to meet him at Doral. Afterwards, the family made summer living arrangements with her aunt. Then, McLean began working with her. Li's practice course is Cinnabar Hills in San Jose.

Li lived with her aunt Tao Zeng four months per year to train in Florida near Trump National Doral Miami and McLean's Golf School. Li was homeschooled. She performed some of her schoolwork through independent study in the months she is in Florida. She also took online courses at the University of Pennsylvania to major in data analytics and psychology. In May 2025, Li graduated from the University of Pennsylvania with a 4.0 GPA and summa cum laude honors while playing full time.

== Amateur career ==
Li holds record for youngest match-play qualifier in U.S. Women's Amateur Public Links history (10 years, 8 months, 16 days), surpassing Michelle Wie's 2000 record by a mere 7 days. Li was the second-youngest qualifier in May 2013 for the U.S. Women's Amateur Public Links before becoming the youngest to advance to match play that June. The lone person younger than Li was Allisen Corpuz, who qualified in 2008.

She is also the youngest U.S. Women's Amateur qualifier, surpassing Latanna Stone's 2012 record age of 10 years, 11 months and 2 days by beginning the first day of the tournament at age 10 years, 10 months and 4 days old on August 5, 2013.

In 2014, at the first ever Drive, Chip and Putt Championship on the Sunday preceding the 78th edition Masters Tournament at Augusta National Golf Club, she won the Girls 10–11 age division. The event was televised on the Golf Channel and was sponsored by the United States Golf Association, Professional Golfers' Association of America and Augusta National to increase youth participation in the sport. Over 10,000 youth from over 110 sites participated in a qualification process that yielded 88 qualifiers from 8 age/gender brackets from each of 11 regions.

On May 19, 2014, she became the youngest (age 11) to qualify for the U.S. Women's Open, surpassing Thompson's record (12 years, 4 months, 18 days) from the 2007 Open. Notably, Li not only qualified, but she won her qualifying event by seven strokes at Old Course at Half Moon Bay Golf Links. Thompson missed the cut in 2007 with a 36-hole 168 total. Li was the second youngest to compete; nine years prior to the introduction of qualification in 1976, Beverly Klass played in the 1967 Open at age 10 years, 7 months, and 21 days. Although Li's qualification was largely heralded, some were befuddled at the state of the sport when a sixth-grader could even qualify for one of the most prestigious events of the year. Li, who had reached a 1.5 handicap by April, had a handicap better than threshold 2.4, making her eligible to participate in qualifications.

Li was 11 years, 8 months, and 19 days on June 19, the opening round of the 2014 U.S. Women's Open, held at Course No. 2 of Pinehurst Resort & Country Club. Edel Golf designed custom clubs that Golf Digest described as "blinged-out" for Li to use in the Open. In the first round on Thursday, Li shot a 78 (+8), which had been the highest score that anyone who made the cut in the 2013 Open had tallied. She followed that up with a second 78 on Friday for 156 (+16) and missed the cut by seven strokes. She then walked the course as a fan that Sunday. She scheduled an appearance in the July U.S. Women's Amateur Public Links in DuPont, Washington next. Li shot 74 and 70 to qualify for match play where she lost to Alice Chen in sudden-death of the first round after posting a stroke play equivalent of a 71. She did not schedule any other USGA events in 2014, deciding instead to play local events and be an 11-year-old. In 2015, she did not qualify for the 2015 U.S. Women's Open.

In August 2016, Li won the Junior PGA Championship. The following month, she was on the winning team for the 2016 Junior Ryder Cup.

She earned low amateur honors at the 2017 ANA Inspiration by being the only amateur to make the cut. She was named to the Junior Solheim Cup team for the United States, who won 14.5–9.5. In October she won The PING Invitational, and she won her next event, Rolex Tournament of Champions, in November.

On May 14 at the Contra Costa Country Club, Pleasant Hill, California, Li qualified for the 2018 U.S. Women's Open, where she was again the youngest player in the field. She was one of seven amateurs to make the cut, and she finished tied for 55th with a 299 (+11). Li was selected to represent the USA in the June 8–10, 2018 Curtis Cup. The United States won by the widest margin in the history of the event (17–3) and Li won her singles match against India Clyburn 5 and 4. At the 2018 U.S. Women's Amateur, Li was co-medalist and earned the number one seed for the match play portion of the event. She lost in the quarter-finals to eventual champion Kristen Gillman on the 19 hole. She contributed to the 2018 Junior Ryder Cup victory.

At the 2018 Summer Youth Olympics, Li teamed with Akshay Bhatia to win the mixed team silver medal.

In 2019, the USGA investigated Li's amateur status after she appeared in an Apple Watch advertisement. Rule 6:2 states: "even if no payment or compensation is received, an amateur golfer is deemed to receive a personal benefit by promoting, advertising or selling anything, or allowing his name or likeness to be used by a third party for the promotion, advertisement or sale of anything. A person who acts contrary to the rules may forfeit his amateur status and as a result will be ineligible to play in amateur competitions." She was given a warning but maintained her amateur status.

Li was named to the 2019 Junior Solheim Cup team.

== Professional career ==
In 2019, Li turned professional in when she was 17 years old. She had status on the Symetra Tour in 2020 through 2022. Her first USGA event as a professional was the U.S. Women's Open where she finished in a tie for 16th place at Olympic Club on June 6, 2021. This has been Li's best finish in a LPGA major event to date, and the $84,000 in prize money more than doubled her career tournament earnings. Her first professional victory on the Epson Tour came in a playoff with an eagle 3 on the first hole at Kinston Country Club's Carolina Golf Classic on June 12, 2022. She picked up her second win a month later at the Twin Bridges Championship in Albany, New York.

Li was the first Epson Tour player in 2022 to qualify for LPGA Tour who was then granted two consecutive LPGA sponsor exemptions in August. By finishing in the top-10 at the second event (CP Women's Open), she automatically qualified for her third consecutive LPGA tournament, the Dana Open. Li was the leader after the second and third rounds, and was paired with Lexi Thompson, another former child prodigy, in the final grouping. After finishing fourth place, Li qualified for the Kroger Queen City Championship, her fourth straight LPGA tournament. Li then had to wait seven months to play in her next competitive professional event. Her second start as a full-time LPGA member occurred in April 2023 when she finished 18th at the DIO Implant LA Open. She finished the year outside the top 100 on the money list but performed well at Q-school (T-17) raising her LPGA ranking status for 2024.

Li captured her first LPGA top-10, as a member, on January 28, 2024, in her first event of the season with a fourth place finish at the LPGA Drive On Championship at Bradenton Country Club in Bradenton, Florida. On May 1, 2024, Li qualified for the U.S. Women's Open by shooting a pair of 67s. On September 29, 2024, Li carded a rare 60 and finished second in a playoff at the Walmart NW Arkansas Championship. This final Sunday round included three eagles. Since 1979, three eagles in one round has only been achieved six times. To date, this 2nd place finish has been Li's best LPGA result. The following week, Li finished T12 at the Buick LPGA Shanghai in China, notably the homeland of her parents.

In 2025, Li had another solid year, making 19 of 25 cuts, highlighted by a T4 at The Annika. She needed a T4 finish to qualify for season ending CME Group Tour Championship, and succeeded. After opening with a 70 she shot rounds of 65, 65, 66 including a birdie on the 72nd hole, catapulting her from projected 61st position to the 58th spot; thereby locking in a tee time at the CME Group Tour Championship, an event reserved for the top 60 players in the standings.

== Amateur wins ==
- 2016 Junior PGA Championship
- 2017 The PING Invitational, Rolex Tournament of Champions

== Professional wins (2) ==
=== Epson Tour wins (2) ===
No.	Date	Tournament	Winning score	To par	Margin of victory	Runner-up	Winner's share ($)
1	Jun 12, 2022	Carolina Golf Classic	66-68-62-69=265	−19	Playoff	(United States) Alexa Pano	30,000
2	Jul 10, 2022	Twin Bridges Championship	66-68-69=203	−10	4 strokes	(Sweden) Linnea Ström	30,000

== Results in LPGA majors ==
Results not in chronological order.

Tournament	2014	2015	2016	2017	2018	2019	2020
Chevron Championship				T70	CUT		
U.S. Women's Open	CUT				T55		
Women's PGA Championship							
The Evian Championship							NT
Women's British Open							

Tournament	2021	2022	2023	2024	2025	2026
Chevron Championship			T54	CUT	T30	CUT
U.S. Women's Open	T16	CUT		CUT		T34
Women's PGA Championship			79	CUT	T12	CUT
The Evian Championship			CUT	CUT	T65	CUT
Women's British Open				CUT	CUT	T16

Did not play

CUT = missed the half-way cut
NT = no tournament
T = tied

=== Summary ===
Tournament	Wins	2nd	3rd	Top-5	Top-10	Top-25	Events	Cuts made
Chevron Championship	0	0	0	0	0	0	6	3
U.S. Women's Open	0	0	0	0	0	1	6	3
Women's PGA Championship	0	0	0	0	0	1	4	2
The Evian Championship	0	0	0	0	0	0	4	1
Women's British Open	0	0	0	0	0	1	3	1
Totals	0	0	0	0	0	3	23	10

- Most consecutive cuts made – 3 (2025 Chevron – 2025 Evian)

== LPGA Tour career summary ==
Year	Tournaments played	Cuts made*	Wins	2nds	3rds	Top 10s	Best finish	Earnings ($)	Money list rank	Scoring average	Scoring rank
2014	1	0	0	0	0	0	CUT	n/a	n/a	78.00	n/a
2015	Did not play										
2016	Did not play										
2017	1	1	0	0	0	0	T70	n/a	n/a	73.75	n/a
2018	2	1	0	0	0	0	T55	n/a	n/a	74.17	n/a
2019	Did not play										
2020	Did not play										
2021	2	2	0	0	0	0	T13	n/a	n/a	71.38	n/a
2022	8	5	0	0	0	2	T4	n/a	n/a	69.85	n/a
2023	21	13	0	0	0	0	T18	177,024	104	72.46	119
2024	27	18	0	1	0	3	2	780,181	54	70.98	32
2025	26	20	0	0	0	2	T4	685,495	56	71.35	64
Totals^	74 (2023)	51	0	1	0	5	2	1,642,700	251		

^ Official as of 2025 season
* Includes matchplay and other tournaments without a cut

== World ranking ==
Position in Women's World Golf Rankings at the end of each calendar year.

Year	World ranking	Source
2017	845	
2018	678	
2019	993	
2020	557	
2021	279	
2022	139	
2023	185	
2024	79	
2025	96	

== U.S. national team appearances ==
Amateur

- Junior Ryder Cup: 2016 (winners), 2018 (winners)
- Junior Solheim Cup: 2017 (winners), 2019 (winners)
- Curtis Cup: 2018 (winners)
- Summer Youth Olympics Mixed team event: 2018
