= 2023 Epson Tour =

The 2023 Epson Tour was a series of professional women's golf tournaments held from March through October 2023 in the United States. The Epson Tour is the second-tier women's professional golf tour in the United States and is the "official developmental tour" of the LPGA Tour. It was most recently known as the Symetra Tour.

== Changes for 2023 ==
The number of tournaments were expanded from 21 to 22. Inaugural events are Hartford HealthCare Women's Championship and Black Desert Resort Championship, while the Ann Arbor's Road to the LPGA was removed from the schedule after only one installment.

The Carolina Golf Classic in North Carolina changed name to Champions Fore Change Invitational.

== Schedule and results ==
The number in parentheses after winners' names show the player's total number of official money, individual event wins on the Epson Tour including that event.

Date	Tournament	Location	Winner	WWGR points	Purse ($)
Mar 5	Florida's Natural Charity Classic	Florida	(France) Agathe Laisné (1)	6	200,000
Mar 19	Carlisle Arizona Women's Golf Classic	Arizona	(Australia) Gabriela Ruffels (1)	6	335,000
Mar 26	IOA Championship	California	(China) Wang Xinying (1)	4	200,000
Apr 2	Casino Del Sol Golf Classic	Arizona	(United States) Gigi Stoll (1)	5	200,000
Apr 29	Copper Rock Championship	Utah	(United States) Savannah Vilaubi (1)	5	230,000
May 7	Garden City Charity Classic at Buffalo Dunes	Kansas	(Australia) Gabriela Ruffels (2)	4	200,000
May 21	IOA Golf Classic	Florida	(United States) Jenny Coleman (1)	4	200,000
May 28	Inova Mission Inn Resort & Club Championship	Florida	(South Korea) Jeon Ji-won (1)	4	200,000
Jun 4	Champions Fore Change Invitational	North Carolina	(Canada) Alena Sharp (2)	4	200,000
Jun 11	FireKeepers Casino Hotel Championship	Michigan	(China) Liu Siyun (1)	4	200,000
Jun 25	Island Resort Championship	Michigan	(Chinese Taipei) Tseng Tsai-ching (1)	4	225,000
Jul 16	Hartford HealthCare Women's Championship	Connecticut	(United States) Jenny Bae (1)	4	200,000
Jul 23	Twin Bridges Championship	New York	(United States) Jenny Bae (2)	4	200,000
Aug 6	French Lick Charity Championship	Indiana	(South Korea) Jeon Ji-won (2)	6	335,000
Aug 12	Four Winds Invitational	Florida	(Australia) Gabriela Ruffels (3)	5	200,000
Aug 20	Wildhorse Ladies Golf Classic	Oregon	(China) Yin Xiaowen (3)	4	200,000
Aug 27	Circling Raven Championship	Idaho	(China) Ren Yue (1)	4	225,000
Sep 9	Black Desert Resort Championship	Utah	(Russia) Nataliya Guseva (1)	4	375,000
Sep 17	Guardian Championship	Alabama	(United States) Cydney Clanton (3)	4	200,000
Sep 24	Murphy USA El Dorado Shootout	Arkansas	(Malaysia) Natasha Andrea Oon (1)	4	225,000
Oct 1	Tuscaloosa Toyota Classic	Alabama	(Mexico) Isabella Fierro (1)	4	200,000
Oct 8	Epson Tour Championship	Florida	(United States) Auston Kim (1)	4	250,000

== Leading money winners ==
The top ten money winners at the end of the season gained fully exempt cards on the LPGA Tour for the 2024 season.

Rank	Player	Country	Events	Prize money ($)
1	Gabriela Ruffels	Australia	13	159,926
2	Natasha Andrea Oon	Malaysia	19	149,670
3	Auston Kim	United States	21	119,882
4	Jeon Ji-won	South Korea	18	115,772
5	Kang Min-ji	South Korea	22	112,342
6	Agathe Laisné	France	20	109,060
7	Jenny Coleman	United States	22	106,137
8	Roberta Liti	Italy	20	103,913
9	Isabella Fierro	Mexico	22	103,290
10	Kristen Gillman	United States	22	95,701

== See also ==
- 2023 LPGA Tour
