= Natasha Oon =

Malaysian professional golfer

Personal information
- Full name: Natasha Andrea Oon
- Nationality: Malaysia
- Born: 10 September 2001 (age 25) Jakarta, Indonesia
- Height: 5 ft 6 in (168 cm)

Career
- Sport: Golf
- College: San Jose State University
- Turned professional: 2022
- Current tour: LPGA Tour (joined 2026)
- Former tour: Epson Tour (joined 2023)
- Professional wins: 1

Number of wins by tour
- Epson Tour: 1

Best results in LPGA major championships
- Chevron Championship: CUT: 2022
- Women's PGA C'ship: CUT: 2026
- U.S. Women's Open: DNP
- Women's British Open: DNP
- Evian Championship: DNP

Achievements and awards
- Mountain West Freshman of the Year: 2019
- Mountain West Women's Golfer of the Year: 2020
- Mountain West Player of the Year: 2022
- Juli Inkster Award: 2022
- Honda Sports Award finalist: 2022
- Epson Tour Rookie of the Year: 2023
Medal record
Southeast Asian Games
Silver medal – second place	2019 Philippines	Women's team

Natasha Andrea Oon (born 10 September 2001) is a Malaysian professional golfer and LPGA Tour player. She was 2023 Epson Tour Rookie of the Year.

== Amateur career ==
Oon, born 2001, is from Kuala Lumpur, Malaysia. When she was just 12 years old, she won a brand new Volvo XC60 after making a hole-in-one at the 40th RSGC Ladies Amateur Open Championship. She played in the Sime Darby LPGA Malaysia in 2016 and 2017, and made the cut to finish 74th and 67th respectively.

She represented Malaysia at the 2018 Asian Games and the 2019 Southeast Asian Games, securing a silver medal in the team event at the latter together with Ashley Lau Jen Wen.

Oon enrolled at San Jose State University in 2018 and played with the San Jose State Spartans women's golf team until 2022. She won her debut tournament, the Minnesota Invitational at Prestwick Golf Club in Woodbury, on her 17th birthday. She was named All-American and Mountain West Freshman of the Year.

Sidelined her junior year due to a fractured metatarsal, Oon had a phenomenal senior year winning the Mountain West Conference Championship, the NCAA Ann Arbor Regional, and finished runner-up at the 2022 NCAA Division I women's golf championship behind Rose Zhang. She was named Mountain West Conference Player of the Year, Honda Sports Award finalist, and received the Inkster Senior Award, an award given to the highest-ranked women's senior collegiate golfer.

Oon was invited to the 2022 Chevron Championship, narrowly missing the cut after rounds of 73 and 74. She was selected for the international team at the 2022 Arnold Palmer Cup but turned professional before the event. She reached a career high of 7th in the World Amateur Golf Ranking.

== Professional career ==
Oon turned professional in 2022 and joined the 2023 Epson Tour. In her rookie season, she was runner-up at the IOA Championship, Casino Del Sol Golf Classic, Island Resort Championship and Twin Bridges Championship before capturing her first title at the Murphy USA El Dorado Shootout. She finished second in the season rankings behind Gabriela Ruffels to become Epson Tour Rookie of the Year and graduate to the LPGA Tour.

Oon missed the 2024 and 2025 seasons due to a sesamoid foot injury, and started competing on the LPGA Tour in 2026.

== Amateur wins ==
- 2016 Sabah International Junior Masters
- 2017 Selangor Amateur Open, Perak Amateur Open
- 2018 Kelantan Amateur Open, Minnesota Invitational
- 2019 The Gold Rush, Malaysian Women's Amateur
- 2022 Mountain West Conference Championship, NCAA Ann Arbor Regional

== Professional wins (1) ==
=== Epson Tour wins (1) ===
- 2023 Murphy USA El Dorado Shootout

== Results in LPGA majors ==
Tournament	2022	2023	2024	2025	2026
Chevron Championship	CUT				
U.S. Women's Open					
Women's PGA Championship					CUT
The Evian Championship					
Women's British Open					

Did not play

CUT = missed the half-way cut
