= 2019 Symetra Tour =

The 2019 Symetra Tour was a series of professional women's golf tournaments held from March through October 2019 in the United States. The Symetra Tour is the second-tier women's professional golf tour in the United States and is the "official developmental tour" of the LPGA Tour. It was previously known as the Futures Tour.

== Schedule and results ==
The number in parentheses after winners' names show the player's total number of official money, individual event wins on the Symetra Tour including that event.

Date	Tournament	Location	Winner	WWGR points	Purse ($)
Mar 10	SKYiGOLF Championship	Florida	(United States) Alana Uriell (1)	4	250,000
Mar 17	Florida's Natural Charity Classic	Florida	(Malaysia) Kelly Tan (1)	3	125,000
Mar 31	IOA Championship	California	(United States) Jillian Hollis (1)	4	125,000
Apr 7	Windsor Golf Classic	California	(Republic of Ireland) Leona Maguire (1)	4	150,000
Apr 28	Murphy USA El Dorado Shootout	Arkansas	(United States) Cydney Clanton (2)	3	150,000
May 11	IOA Invitational	Georgia	(Spain) María Parra (1)	4	150,000
May 17	Symetra Classic	North Carolina	(Republic of Ireland) Leona Maguire (2)	4	175,000
May 26	Zimmer Biomet Championship	Alabama	(Spain) Nuria Iturrioz (1)	6	300,000
Jun 2	Valley Forge Invitational	Pennsylvania	(Chinese Taipei) Min Lee (2)	3	125,000
Jun 9	Four Winds Invitational	Indiana	(France) Perrine Delacour (1)	3	150,000
Jun 16	Forsyth Classic	Illinois	(United States) Jillian Hollis (2)	4	200,000
Jun 23	Island Resort Championship	Michigan	(United States) Daniela Iacobelli (3)	4	200,000
Jun 30	Prasco Charity Championship	Ohio	(France) Perrine Delacour (2)	3	125,000
Jul 13	Donald Ross Classic	Indiana	(Thailand) Patty Tavatanakit (1)	4	225,000
Jul 21	Danielle Downey Credit Union Classic	New York	(Thailand) Patty Tavatanakit (2)	4	175,000
Jul 28	The CDPHP Open	New York	(United States) Robynn Ree (1)	3	125,000
Aug 11	PHC Classic	Wisconsin	(United States) Robynn Ree (2)	4	125,000
Aug 18	FireKeepers Casino Hotel Championship	Michigan	(Chinese Taipei) Ssu-Chia Cheng (1)	4	125,000
Sep 1	Sioux Falls GreatLIFE Challenge	South Dakota	(Thailand) Patty Tavatanakit (3)	4	225,000
Sep 8	Garden City Charity Classic	Kansas	(Mexico) Alejandra Llaneza (2)	4	175,000
Sep 22	Guardian Championship	Alabama	(Panama) Laura Restrepo (1)	4	175,000
Sep 29	IOA Golf Classic	Florida	(Spain) Marta Sanz Barrio (2)	4	175,000
Oct 6	Symetra Tour Championship	Florida	(United States) Laura Wearn (2)	4	250,000

== Leading money winners ==
The top ten money winners at the end of the season gained fully exempt cards on the LPGA Tour for the 2020 season.

Rank	Player	Country	Events	Prize money ($)
1	Perrine Delacour	France	20	125,042
2	Patty Tavatanakit	Thailand	11	117,518
3	Jenny Coleman	United States	23	104,840
4	Ssu-Chia Cheng	Chinese Taipei	22	99,232
5	Jillian Hollis	United States	18	98,044
6	Julieta Granada	Paraguay	19	94,343
7	Leona Maguire	Ireland	16	92,517
8	Robynn Ree	United States	19	90,518
9	Esther Lee	United States	21	87,360
10	Mind Muangkhumsakul	Thailand	16	81,046

== See also ==
- 2019 LPGA Tour
- 2019 in golf
