= 2022 Epson Tour =

The 2022 Epson Tour is a series of professional women's golf tournaments held from March through October 2022 in the United States. The Epson Tour is the second-tier women's professional golf tour in the United States and is the "official developmental tour" of the LPGA Tour. It was most recently known as the Symetra Tour.

== Schedule and results ==
The number in parentheses after winners' names show the player's total number of official money, individual event wins on the Epson Tour including that event.

Date	Tournament	Location	Winner	WWGR points	Purse ($)
Mar 6	Florida's Natural Charity Classic	Florida	(South Korea) Park Kum-Kang (2)	5	200,000
Mar 20	Carlisle Arizona Women's Golf Classic	Arizona	(Spain) Fátima Fernández Cano (2)	6	200,000
Mar 27	IOA Championship	California	(Sweden) Linnea Ström (2)	5	200,000
Apr 3	Casino Del Sol Golf Classic	Arizona	(United States) Andrea Lee (1)	5	200,000
Apr 23	Copper Rock Championship	Utah	(Philippines) Dottie Ardina (1)	4	200,000
May 1	Garden City Charity Classic at Buffalo Dunes	Kansas	(United States) Gabriella Then (1)	3	200,000
May 22	IOA Golf Classic	Florida	(Australia) Grace Kim (1)	4	200,000
May 29	Inova Mission Inn Resort and Club Championship	Florida	(United States) Gina Kim (1)	4	200,000
Jun 12	Carolina Golf Classic	North Carolina	(United States) Lucy Li (1)	3	200,000
Jun 18	Ann Arbor's Road to the LPGA	Michigan	(Finland) Kiira Riihijärvi (1)	4	200,000
Jun 26	Island Resort Championship	Michigan	(Chinese Taipei) Ssu-Chia Cheng (2)	3	200,000
Jul 10	Twin Bridges Championship	New York	(United States) Lucy Li (2)	3	200,000
Jul 31	FireKeepers Casino Hotel Championship	Michigan	(China) Yin Xiaowen (1)	4	200,000
Aug 7	French Lick Charity Championship	Indiana	(China) Yin Xiaowen (2)	6	335,000
Aug 14	Four Winds Invitational	Indiana	(China) Liu Yan (1)	5	200,000
Aug 28	Circling Raven Championship	Idaho	(United States) Jillian Hollis (3)	4	200,000
Sep 4	Wildhorse Ladies Golf Classic	Oregon	(United States) Daniela Iacobelli (4)	5	200,000
Sep 18	Guardian Championship	Alabama	(Puerto Rico) Maria Torres (1)	4	200,000
Sep 25	Murphy USA El Dorado Shootout	Arkansas	(United States) Britney Yada (1)	4	225,000
Oct 2	Tuscaloosa Toyota Classic	Alabama	(Norway) Celine Borge (1)	5	200,000
Oct 9	Epson Tour Championship	Florida	(Thailand) Jaravee Boonchant (1)	5	250,000

== Leading money winners ==
The top ten money winners at the end of the season gained fully exempt cards on the LPGA Tour for the 2023 season.

Rank	Player	Country	Events	Prize money ($)
1	Linnea Ström	Sweden	17	119,190
2	Yin Xiaowen	China	15	118,860
3	Lucy Li	United States	11	110,111
4	Kiira Riihijärvi	Finland	19	90,483
5	Grace Kim	Australia	19	89,720
6	Celine Borge	Norway	21	89,710
7	Gabriella Then	United States	17	86,578
8	Gina Kim	United States	13	82,133
9	Liu Yan	China	21	80,139
10	Jang Hyo-joon	South Korea	19	78,611

== See also ==
- 2022 LPGA Tour
- 2022 in golf
