= 2025 Epson Tour =

Golf tour season

The 2025 Epson Tour was a series of professional women's golf tournaments held from March through October 2025 in the United States. The Epson Tour is the second-tier women's professional golf tour in the United States and is the "official developmental tour" of the LPGA Tour. It was most recently known as the Symetra Tour.

== Changes for 2025 ==
The number of tournaments was increased from 19 to 20 while total prize money remained at $5 million. Inaugural events are the Reliance Matrix Championship, Great Lakes Championship and Greater Toledo Classic, while the Casino Del Sol Golf Classic and Tuscaloosa Toyota Classic were removed from the schedule. Florida's Natural Charity Classic was renamed Central Florida Championship and Twin Bridges Championship in New York was renamed Casella Golf Championship.

== Schedule and results ==
The number in parentheses after winners' names show the player's total number of official money, individual event wins on the Epson Tour including that event.

Date	Tournament	Location	Winner	WWGR points	Purse ($)
Mar 2	Central Florida Championship	Florida	(United States) Riley Smyth (1)	5	250,000
Mar 8	Atlantic Beach Classic	Florida	(Israel) Laetitia Beck (1)	5	250,000
Mar 16	IOA Golf Classic	Florida	(United States) Gina Kim (2)	5	225,000
Apr 27	IOA Championship	California	(United States) Briana Chacon (2)	5	225,000
May 4	Reliance Matrix Championship	Nevada	(United States) Yana Wilson (1)	5	250,000
May 11	Carlisle Arizona Women's Golf Classic	Arizona	(Germany) Sophia Popov (1)	6	400,000
May 17	Copper Rock Championship	Utah	(United States) Gina Kim (3)	4	250,000
Jun 8	FireKeepers Casino Hotel Championship	Michigan	(United States) Samantha Wagner (1)	4	225,000
Jun 15	Great Lakes Championship	Michigan	(United States) Riley Smyth (2)	4	250,000
Jun 22	Island Resort Championship	Michigan	(United States) Melanie Green (1)	5	225,000
Jun 29	Otter Creek Championship	Indiana	(United States) Jillian Hollis (4)	4	250,000
Jul 13	Hartford HealthCare Women's Championship	Connecticut	(United States) Gina Kim (4)	5	225,000
Jul 20	Casella Golf Championship	New York	(United States) Briana Chacon (3)	5	200,000
Jul 27	Greater Toledo Classic	Ohio	(United States) Mia Hammond (1) (a)	5	300,000
Aug 3	Four Winds Invitational	Indiana	(Canada) Leah John (1)	5	225,000
Aug 17	Wildhorse Ladies Golf Classic	Oregon	(Japan) Erika Hara (1)	4	250,000
Aug 24	Dream First Bank Charity Classic	Kansas	(United States) Yana Wilson (2)	4	200,000
Sep 14	Guardian Championship	Alabama	(United States) Melanie Green (2)	5	250,000
Sep 21	Murphy USA El Dorado Shootout	Arkansas	(United States) Erica Shepherd (1)	5	300,000
Oct 5	Epson Tour Championship	California	(United States) Anne Chen (1)	5	250,000

== Race for the Card ==
The top 15 under a points-based ranking gained fully exempt cards on the LPGA Tour for the 2026 season.

Rank	Player	Country	Events	Points
1	Melanie Green	United States	19	2,573
2	Yana Wilson	United States	19	2,265
3	Gina Kim	United States	18	2,085
4	Sophia Schubert	United States	20	1,857
5	Erika Hara	Japan	18	1,847
6	Briana Chacon	United States	19	1,687
7	Riley Smyth	United States	20	1,588
8	Laetitia Beck	Israel	20	1,562
9	Kang Min-ji	South Korea	20	1,529
10	Hailee Cooper	United States	19	1,500
11	Anne Chen	United States	20	1,260
12	Isabella Fierro	Mexico	19	1,120
13	Michelle Zhang	China	19	1,018
14	Carla Tejedo Mulet	Spain	18	994
15	Laney Frye	United States	19	966

== Awards ==
- Player of the Year, player who leads the rankings at the end of the season
  - (United States) Melanie Green
- Rookie of the Year Award, first year player with the highest finish on the official rankings
  - (United States) Melanie Green

== See also ==
- 2025 LPGA Tour
