= Megha Ganne =

American professional golfer (born c. 2003)

Personal information
- Nationality: United States
- Born: 2003 or 2004 (age 22–23) Long Branch, New Jersey, U.S.
- Height: 5 ft 7 in (170 cm)

Career
- Sport: Golf
- College: Stanford University
- Turned professional: 2026
- Current tour: Epson Tour
- Professional wins: 1

Number of wins by tour
- Epson Tour: 1

Best results in LPGA major championships
- Chevron Championship: CUT: 2026
- Women's PGA C'ship: DNP
- U.S. Women's Open: T14: 2021
- Women's British Open: DNP
- Evian Championship: DNP

Megha Ganne (born 2003 or 2004) is an American professional golfer. In June 2021, as a 17-year-old high school student, Ganne qualified for the U.S. Women's Open. At the tournament she held a share of the lead after the opening round, and was tied for third going into the final round; she finished as the leading amateur, in a tie for 14th place. Since the age of twelve, she has been competing in golf tournaments. Her parents are from India. Her younger sister, Sirina Ganne, is also a golfer and won the New Jersey high school girls' individual state championship in 2023 while representing Holmdel High School. Megha has been coached for nine years by Katie Rudolph. In August 2025, Ganne won the U.S. Women's Amateur.

Ganne turned professional in 2026. She won her first professional tournament at the Wildhorse Ladies Golf Classic on the Epson Tour in August 2026.

== Amateur wins ==
- 2017 New Jersey Junior PGA Championship
- 2018 AJGA Championship
- 2021 Scott Robertson Memorial
- 2023 Carmel Cup
- 2024 Nanea Invitational
- 2025 U.S. Women's Amateur, Stanford Intercollegiate

== Professional wins (1) ==
=== Epson Tour wins (1) ===
- 2026 Wildhorse Ladies Golf Classic

== Results in LPGA majors ==
Tournament	2021	2022	2023	2024	2025	2026
Chevron Championship						CUT
U.S. Women's Open	T14LA			CUT		CUT
Women's PGA Championship						
The Evian Championship						
Women's British Open						

Did not play

LA = low amateur
CUT = missed the half-way cut
"T" = tied

== U.S. national team appearances ==
- Junior Solheim Cup: 2021
- Curtis Cup: 2022 (winners)
- Arnold Palmer Cup: 2025
- Espirito Santo Trophy: 2025 (winners)
