= Carolina Golf Classic =

Golf tournament in North Carolina

Tournament information
- Location: Greensboro, North Carolina
- Established: 2020
- Course(s): Forest Oaks Country Club
- Par: 72
- Length: 6,643 yards (6,074 m)
- Tour(s): Epson Tour
- Format: Stroke play
- Prize fund: $200,000
- Month played: June
- Final year: 2023

Final champion
- (Canada) Alena Sharp

The Carolina Golf Classic was a tournament on the Epson Tour, the LPGA's developmental tour, from 2020 to 2023. It was held at Forest Oaks Country Club in Greensboro, North Carolina.

In 2020, with her win at the Carolina Golf Classic, Ana Belac won Player of the Year and finished first on the Symetra Tour money list earning her LPGA Tour card for the 2021 season.

== Winners ==
Year	Date	Winner	Country	Score	Margin of victory	Runner(s)-up	Purse ($)	Winner's share ($)
Champions Fore Change Invitational
2023	Jun 4	Alena Sharp	Canada	199 (−17)	2 strokes	(United States) Gigi Stoll	200,000	30,000
Carolina Golf Classic Presented by Blue Cross and Blue Shield of North Carolina
2022	Jun 12	Lucy Li	United States	265 (−19)	Playoff	(United States) Alexa Pano	200,000	30,000
2021	Oct 3	Sophia Schubert	United States	270 (−18)	Playoff	(Spain) Fatima Fernandez Cano	200,000	30,000
2020	Oct 31	Ana Belac	Slovenia	281 (−7)	4 strokes	(United States) Allison Emrey	200,000	30,000
