= Cydney Clanton =

American professional golfer (born 1989)

Personal information
- Nationality: United States
- Born: July 18, 1989 (age 37) Winston-Salem, North Carolina, U.S.

Career
- Sport: Golf
- College: Auburn University
- Turned professional: 2011
- Former tours: LPGA Tour; Epson Tour
- Professional wins: 4

Number of wins by tour
- LPGA Tour: 1
- Epson Tour: 3

Best results in LPGA major championships
- Chevron Championship: T60: 2018
- Women's PGA C'ship: T9: 2021
- U.S. Women's Open: CUT: 2008, 2012, 2016, 2018, 2020
- Women's British Open: T14: 2020
- Evian Championship: CUT: 2016, 2017, 2018

Cydney Clanton (born July 18, 1989) is an American professional golfer who has played on the LPGA Tour and the Epson Tour. She has won three times on the Epson Tour and once on the LPGA Tour.

== Amateur career ==
Clanton played college golf at Auburn University where she won twice. She also won the North and South Women's Amateur. She played on the winning 2010 Curtis Cup team where she won two matches and halved a third. She also played on the U.S. team at the 2010 Espirito Santo Trophy that finished second to the South Korea team.

== Professional career ==
Clanton turned professional in 2011 and played on the Symetra Tour that year. She earned her LPGA Tour card for 2012 through the LPGA Final Qualifying Tournament. She has played on both tours since: winning the 2013 Four Winds Invitational and 2019 Murphy USA El Dorado Shootout on the Symetra Tour and the 2019 Dow Great Lakes Bay Invitational on the LPGA Tour. The Dow tournament was a team event where she partnered with Jasmine Suwannapura.

== Amateur wins ==
this list may be incomplete

- 2010 North and South Women's Amateur

== Professional wins ==
=== LPGA Tour wins (1) ===
No.	Date	Tournament	Winning score	Margin of victory	Runner(s)-up
1	20 Jul 2019	Dow Great Lakes Bay Invitational with (Thailand) Thidapa Suwannapura	−27 (67-64-63-59=253)	6 strokes	(South Korea) Ko Jin-young and (Australia) Minjee Lee

=== Epson Tour wins (3) ===
- 2013 Four Winds Invitational
- 2019 Murphy USA El Dorado Shootout
- 2023 Guardian Championship

== Results in LPGA majors ==
Results not in chronological order.

Tournament	2008	2009	2010	2011	2012
Chevron Championship					T70
U.S. Women's Open	CUT				CUT
Women's PGA Championship					CUT
Women's British Open					

Tournament	2013	2014	2015	2016	2017	2018	2019	2020	2021	2022	2023	2023
Chevron Championship				CUT		T60		CUT	T70	CUT		
U.S. Women's Open				CUT		CUT		CUT				
Women's PGA Championship		CUT		T26	T64	CUT		T37	T9	70		CUT
The Evian Championship ^				CUT	CUT	CUT		NT	CUT			
Women's British Open				CUT	T49		CUT	T14	CUT			

^ The Evian Championship was added as a major in 2013

Top 10
Did not play

CUT = missed the half-way cut
NT = no tournament
T = tied

== U.S. national team appearances ==
- Espirito Santo Trophy: 2010
- Curtis Cup: 2010 (winners)
