= FireKeepers Casino Hotel Championship =

Golf tournament in Michigan

Tournament information
- Location: Battle Creek, Michigan
- Established: 2015
- Course: Battle Creek Golf Club
- Par: 72
- Length: 6,702 yards (6,128 m)
- Tour: Epson Tour
- Format: Stroke play
- Prize fund: $200,000
- Month played: June

Current champion
- (United States) Lauryn Nguyen

The FireKeepers Casino Hotel Championship is a tournament on the Epson Tour, the LPGA's developmental tour. It has been a part of the tour's schedule since 2014.

It is held at Battle Creek Golf Club in Battle Creek, Michigan, designed by Scottish golf course architect Willie Park Jr. in 1919.

Title sponsor is the FireKeepers Casino Hotel, owned and operated by the local Nottawaseppi Huron Band of Potawatomi.

== Winners ==
| Year | Date | Winner | Country | Score | Margin of victory | Runner(s)-up | Purse ($) | Winner's share ($) |
|---|---|---|---|---|---|---|---|---|
| 2026 | Jun 14 | Lauryn Nguyen | United States | 204 (−12) | 3 strokes | (United States) Jenny Coleman | 200,000 | 30,000 |
| 2025 | Jun 8 | Samantha Wagner | United States | 203 (−13) | 2 strokes | (United States) Sophia Schubert | 225,000 | 33,750 |
| 2024 | Jun 9 | Cassie Porter | Australia | 210 (−6) | 1 stroke | (New Zealand) Amelia Garvey (Chinese Taipei) Hung Jo-Hua (United States) Brooke Matthews (England) Anita Uwadia | 200,000 | 30,000 |
| 2023 | Jun 11 | Liu Siyun | China | 206 (−10) | 1 stroke | (New Zealand) Amelia Garvey | 200,000 | 30,000 |
| 2022 | Jul 31 | Yin Xiaowen | China | 203 (−13) | Playoff | (United States) Gina Kim | 200,000 | 30,000 |
| 2021 | Aug 8 | Fernanda Lira | Mexico | 197 (−19) | 6 strokes | (Germany) Isi Gabsa (United States) Daniela Iacobelli (United States) Sophia Schubert (United States) Lilia Vu | 175,000 | 26,250 |
| 2020 | Jul 26 | Ruixin Liu | China | 203 (−13) | 2 strokes | (United States) Bailey Tardy | 175,000 | 26,250 |
| 2019 | Aug 18 | Ssu-Chia Cheng | Chinese Taipei | 203 (−13) | 2 strokes | (Paraguay) Milagros Chavez (South Africa) Paula Reto | 125,000 | 18,750 |
| 2018 | Aug 19 | Marta Sanz Barrio | Spain | 213 (−3) | 1 stroke | (Canada) Augusta James | 100,000 | 15,000 |
| 2017 | Jul 30 | Erynne Lee | United States | 204 (−12) | 2 strokes | (Thailand) Benyapa Niphatsophon | 100,000 | 15,000 |
| 2016 | Jul 24 | Laura Gonzalez Escallon | Belgium | 129 (−15) | 6 strokes | (United States) Ally McDonald | 100,000 | 15,000 |
| 2015 | Jun 7 | Madeleine Sheils | United States | 206 (−10) | 2 strokes | (United States) Lindy Duncan (United States) Katelyn Sepmoree | 100,000 | 15,000 |
| 2014 | Jun 8 | Min Seo Kwak | South Korea | 204 (−12) | 3 strokes | (United States) Daniela Iacobelli | 100,000 | 15,000 |
