= IOA Championship =

Golf tournament in California

Tournament information
- Location: Beaumont, California
- Established: 2013
- Course: Morongo Golf Club at Tukwet Canyon
- Par: 72
- Length: 6,534 yards (5,975 m)
- Tour: Epson Tour
- Format: Stroke play
- Prize fund: $200,000
- Month played: April

Tournament record score
- Aggregate: 195 Juliana Hung (2024)
- To par: −21 as above

Current champion
- (United States) Amari Avery

The IOA Championship is a tournament on the Epson Tour, the LPGA's developmental tour. It has been a part of the tour's schedule since 2013. It is held at Morongo Golf Club at Tukwet Canyon in Beaumont, California.

The tournament started out as the Volvik Championship held in Florida in 2013, before moving to California in 2014 and changing name to the IOA Championship in 2016.

In 2020, the tournament was postponed due to the COVID-19 pandemic.

== Winners ==
Year	Date	Winner	Country	Score	Margin of victory	Runner(s)-up	Purse ($)	Winner's share ($)
IOA Championship Presented by Morongo Casino Resort & Spa
2026	Apr 26	Amari Avery	United States	205 (−11)	1 stroke	(Spain) Carla Bernat	200,000	30,000
2025	Apr 27	Briana Chacon	United States	204 (−12)	1 stroke	(United States) Megan Schofill	225,000	33,750
2024	Apr 28	Juliana Hung	Chinese Taipei	195 (−21)	9 strokes	(New Zealand) Fiona Xu	200,000	30,000
2023	Mar 26	Wang Xinying	China	204 (−12)	1 stroke	(Malaysia) Natasha Andrea Oon	200,000	30,000
2022	Mar 27	Linnea Ström	Sweden	205 (−11)	3 strokes	(Paraguay) Milagros Chaves (Germany) Sophie Hausmann (Australia) Sarah Jane Smith	200,000	30,000
2021	Mar 28	Sophie Hausmann	Germany	206 (−10)	3 strokes	(Canada) Maude-Aimee Leblanc (United States) Sophia Schubert	150,000	22,250
2020	Aug 23 (Note: Tournament rescheduled from Mar 27–29.)	Fátima Fernández Cano	Spain	204 (−12)	2 strokes	(United States) Anna Redding	125,000	18,750
2019	Mar 31	Jillian Hollis	United States	212 (−4)	1 stroke	(Paraguay) Julieta Granada (United States) Amy Lee	125,000	18,750
2018	Apr 8	Stephanie Meadow	Northern Ireland	212 (−4)	Playoff	(United States) Carleigh Silvers	100,000	15,000
2017	Mar 26	Daniela Darquea	Ecuador	204 (−12)	3 strokes	(Thailand) Benyapa Niphatsophon (Canada) Ann-Catherine Tanguay	100,000	15,000
2016	Feb 21	Erynne Lee	United States	205 (−11)	1 stroke	(Canada) Jessica Wallace	100,000	15,000
Volvik Championship
2015	Mar 1	Katie Kempter	United States	211 (−5)	Playoff	(United States) Lee Lopez	100,000	15,000
2014	Mar 2	Kim Kaufman	United States	137 (−7) (Note: Tournament reduced to 36 holes due to adverse weather conditions.)	4 strokes	(United States) Jennie Lee	100,000	15,000
2013	Sep 22	Hannah Yun	United States	202 (−14)	2 strokes	(Canada) Alena Sharp	100,000	15,000
