= Copper Rock Championship =

Golf tournament in Utah

Tournament information
- Location: Hurricane, Utah
- Established: 2020
- Course: Copper Rock Golf Course
- Par: 72
- Length: 6,537 yards (5,977 m)
- Tour: Epson Tour
- Format: Stroke play
- Prize fund: $250,000
- Month played: May

Tournament record score
- Aggregate: 194 Fiona Xu (2024)
- To par: −22 as above

Current champion
- (New Zealand) Fiona Xu

The Copper Rock Championship is a tournament on the Epson Tour, the LPGA's developmental tour. It has been a part of the tour's schedule since 2020. It is held at Copper Rock Golf Course in Hurricane, Utah.

The 2020 tournament was cancelled due to the COVID-19 pandemic.

== Winners ==
Year	Date	Winner	Country	Score	Margin of victory	Runner(s)-up	Purse ($)	Winner's share ($)
2026	May 16	Fiona Xu	New Zealand	203 (−13)	3 strokes	(United States) Ashley Menne (United States) Annabelle Pancake-Webb (Canada) Maddie Szeryk-DiBello	250,000	37,500
2025	May 17	Gina Kim	United States	203 (−13)	1 stroke	(United States) Melanie Green (Spain) Carla Tejedo Mulet	250,000	37,500
2024	May 18	Fiona Xu	New Zealand	194 (−22)	7 strokes	(South Africa) Kaleigh Telfer	250,000	37,500
2023	Apr 29	Savannah Vilaubi	United States	201 (−15)	Playoff	(United States) Jenny Coleman (United States) Therese Warner	230,000	34,500
2022	Apr 23	Dottie Ardina	Philippines	211 (−5)	2 strokes	(Spain) Marta Sanz Barrio (Israel) Laetitia Beck	200,000	30,000
2021	Apr 24	Bailey Tardy	United States	206 (−10)	3 strokes	(Canada) Maude-Aimee Leblanc (United States) Samantha Wagner	200,000	30,000
2020	Sep 5	Tournament cancelled					200,000	30,000
