= 2027 LPGA Tour =

Professional women's golf tour

2027 LPGA Tour season
- Duration: February 1, 2027 – November 21, 2027
- Number of official events: 31

The 2027 LPGA Tour is the 78th edition of the LPGA Tour, a series of professional golf tournaments for elite female golfers from around the world. The season will begin at the Hilton Grand Vacations Tournament of Champions, in Orlando, Florida on February 1, and will end on November 21, at the Tiburón Golf Club in the CME Group Tour Championship at Naples, Florida. The tournaments were sanctioned by the United States-based Ladies Professional Golf Association (LPGA).

== Schedule and results ==
The number in parentheses after each winners' name is the player's total number of wins in official money individual events on the LPGA Tour, including that event. Tournament and winner names in bold indicate LPGA majors. The schedule and purse amount for each tournament is listed on the LPGA website. The LPGA has a standard formula for payout percentages and distribution of its purse and prize money for every event. The winner typically gets 15% of the total, second place gets 9.3%, third place 6.75%, etc.

The total purse for 2027 is $147 million, an increase of nearly $12 million.

Key

Major championships
Regular events

Date	Tournament	Location	Winner(s) (Note: The number in brackets after each winner's name is the number of LPGA Tour events he had won up to and including that tournament. This information is only shown for LPGA Tour members.)	WWGR points	Other tours (Note: CLPGA − China LPGA Tour, JLPGA − LPGA of Japan Tour, LET − Ladies European Tour.)	Purse (US$)	Winner's share ($)
Feb 7	Hilton Grand Vacations Tournament of Champions	Florida				2,225,000	333,750
Feb 21	Honda LPGA Thailand	Thailand				2,000,000	300,000
Feb 28	HSBC Women's World Championship	Singapore				3,100,000	465,000
Mar 7	Futu Ladies World Championship	Hong Kong			CLPGA	3,400,000	510,000
Mar 14	Nanea Cup	Hawaii				4,000,000	600,000
Mar 21	Lotte Championship	Hawaii				3,000,000	450,000
Mar 28	Ford Championship	Arizona				2,225,000	333,750
Apr 4	Fortinet Founders Cup	California				3,000,000	450,000
Apr 18	JM Eagle LA Championship	California				4,750,000	712,500
Apr 25	**Chevron Championship**	Texas		100		9,000,000	1,350,000
May 9	Riviera Maya Open	Mexico				2,500,000	375,000
May 16	Mizuho Americas Open	New Jersey				3,250,000	487,500
May 30	The Classic	New York				5,000,000	750,000
Jun 6	**U.S. Women's Open**	Ohio		100		12,500,000	2,500,000
Jun 13	ShopRite LPGA Classic	New Jersey				2,000,000	300,000
Jun 20	Meijer LPGA Classic	Michigan				3,250,000	487,500
Jun 27	**KPMG Women's PGA Championship**	Maryland		100		13,000,000	1,950,000
Jul 11	**Amundi Evian Championship**	France		100	LET	9,100,000	1,400,000
Jul 25	PIF London Championship	England			LET	4,000,000	600,000
Aug 1	**AIG Women's Open**	England		100	LET	10,000,000	1,500,000
Aug 22	CPKC Women's Open	Canada				2,750,000	412,500
Aug 29	FM Championship	Massachusetts				4,700,000	705,000
Sep 19	The Standard Portland Classic	Oregon				2,100,000	315,000
Sep 26	Walmart NW Arkansas Championship	Arkansas				3,000,000	450,000
Oct 3	Dow Championship	Michigan		n/a		3,300,000	
Oct 17	BMW Ladies Championship	South Korea				2,400,000	360,000
Oct 24	Buick LPGA Shanghai	China			CLPGA	3,300,000	495,000
Oct 31	Maybank Championship	Malaysia				3,000,000	450,000
Nov 7	Japan Classic	Japan			JLPGA	3,000,000	450,000
Nov 14	The Annika	Florida				3,250,000	487,500
Nov 21	CME Group Tour Championship	Florida				11,000,000	4,000,000

=== Unofficial events ===
The following events appear on the schedule, but do not carry official money.

Date	Tournament	Location	Winner	WWGR points	Purse (US$)	Winner's share ($)
Sep 12	International Crown	California		n/a	2,500,000	375,000
Dec 12	Grant Thornton Invitational	Florida		n/a	2,100,000	315,000
