= Carlisle Arizona Women's Golf Classic =

Golf tournament in Arozona

Tournament information
- Location: Scottsdale, Arizona
- Established: 2021
- Course(s): TPC Scottsdale; Champions Course
- Par: 71
- Length: 6,566 yards (6,004 m)
- Tour: Epson Tour
- Format: Stroke play
- Prize fund: $400,000
- Month played: May

Current champion
- (United States) Megan Schofill

The Carlisle Arizona Women's Golf Classic is a tournament on the Epson Tour, the LPGA's developmental tour. It was first played in 2013 and was held at Longbow Golf Club in Mesa, Arizona through 2023. In 2024, the event moved to TPC Scottsdale (Champions Course) in Scottsdale, Arizona.

== History ==
For 2013 and 2014, the title sponsor of the tournament was VisitMesa.com, the official website of the Mesa Convention and Visitors Bureau. Former Arizona State player Jaclyn Sweeney won the inaugural tournament, closing with birdies in three of the last four holes in windy conditions for a two-stroke victory. She also received a spot in the LPGA Founders Cup.

The tournament was a 54-hole event, as were most Epson Tour tournaments, and included pre-tournament pro-am opportunities, in which local amateur golfers can play with the professional golfers from the Tour.

In 2015, at 16 years, 9 months, 11 days, Hannah O'Sullivan became the youngest player win on the Epson Tour. The age mark was previously held by Cristie Kerr, who won the 1995 Ironwood Futures Classic in Florida at the age of 17. She also become just the third woman to win on the LPGA Tour or the Epson Tour before her 17th birthday, the only other women to win as a 16-year-old are Lydia Ko and Lexi Thompson.

In 2021 Carlisle Companies became title sponsor and play was extended to 72 holes. Ruixin Liu of China and 17-year-old amateur Rose Zhang finished 17-under par after 72-holes. Both made par on the first playoff-hole, but on the next hole Zhang's second shot found the desert left of the fairway and she had to take an unplayable. Liu made a birdie to win her fifth Symetra Tour title.

In 2022 players competed for $250,000, tied with the Epson Tour Championship for the second-highest purse of the season.

Tournament names through the years:

- 2013: VisitMesa.com Gateway Classic
- 2014: Visit Mesa Gateway Classic at Longbow Golf Club
- 2015: Gateway Classic
- 2017: Gateway Classic at Longbow Golf Club
- 2020: Founders Tribute at Longbow
- 2021–2025: Carlisle Arizona Women's Golf Classic

== Winners ==
Year	Date	Winner	Country	Score	Margin of victory	Runner(s)-up	Purse ($)	Winner's share ($)
2026	May 3	Megan Schofill	United States	273 (−11)	1 stroke	(United States) Amari Avery	400,000	60,000
2025	May 11	Sophia Popov	Germany	270 (−14)	2 strokes	(China) Michelle Zhang	400,000	60,000
2024	Mar 12	Ruixin Liu	China	270 (−14)	3 strokes	(United States) Mariel Galdiano	400,000	60,000
2023	Mar 19	Gabriela Ruffels	Australia	270 (−18)	2 strokes	(United States) Kathleen Scavo	335,000	50,250
2022	Mar 20	Fátima Fernández Cano	Spain	271 (−17)	3 strokes	(Paraguay) Sofia Garcia (Sweden) Dani Holmqvist (Dominican Republic) Laura Restrepo	250,000	37,500
2021	Mar 21	Ruixin Liu	China	271 (−17)	Playoff	(United States) Rose Zhang (a)	200,000	30,000
2020	Aug 16	Sarah White	United States	201 (−15)	1 stroke	(United States) Casey Danielson (Germany) Sophia Popov	125,000	18,750
2018–19: No tournament
2017	Apr 1	Liv Cheng	New Zealand	209 (−7)	Playoff	(United States) Mina Harigae	100,000	15,000
2016: No tournament
2015	Feb 22	Hannah O'Sullivan (a)	United States	201 (−15)	4 strokes	(United States) Haley Italia	100,000	15,000
2014	Feb 23	Alena Sharp	Canada	204 (−12)	2 strokes	(United States) Marissa Steen	100,000	15,000
2013	Feb 24	Jaclyn Sweeney	United States	209 (−7)	2 strokes	(Canada) Alena Sharp	100,000	15,000

== Tournament records ==
Year	Player	Score	Round
2020	Sophia Popov	63 (–9)	2nd
