= Circling Raven Championship =

Golf tournament in Idaho

Tournament information
- Location: Worley, Idaho
- Established: 2020
- Course(s): Circling Raven Golf Club
- Par: 72
- Tour(s): Epson Tour
- Format: Stroke play
- Prize fund: $225,000
- Month played: August
- Final year: 2023

Final champion
- (China) Ren Yue

The Circling Raven Championship was a tournament on the Epson Tour, the LPGA's developmental tour. It was held at Circling Raven Golf Club near Worley, Idaho, owned and operated by the Coeur d'Alene Tribe.

The inaugural tournament in 2020 was cancelled due to the COVID-19 pandemic.

== Winners ==
Year	Date	Winner	Country	Score	Margin of victory	Runner-up	Purse ($)	Winner's share ($)
2023	Aug 27	Ren Yue	China	203 (−13)	Playoff	(Thailand) Chanettee Wannasaen	225,000	33,750
2022	Aug 28	Jillian Hollis	United States	198 (−18)	2 strokes	(Australia) Robyn Choi	200,000	30,000
2021	Aug 29	Peiyun Chien	Chinese Taipei	200 (−16)	1 stroke	(United States) Demi Runas	200,000	30,000
2020	Aug 30	Tournament cancelled (Note: Tournament cancelled due to the pandemic)					200,000	30,000
