= Fátima Fernández Cano =

Spanish professional golfer

Personal information
- Nickname: Fati
- Nationality: Spain
- Born: 23 October 1995 (age 31) Santiago de Compostela, Spain
- Height: 5 ft 7 in (1.70 m)

Career
- Sport: Golf
- College: Troy University
- Turned professional: 2018
- Current tours: LPGA Tour (joined 2021); Ladies European Tour (joined 2024)
- Former tour: Symetra Tour (joined 2018)
- Professional wins: 3

Number of wins by tour
- Epson Tour: 3

Best results in LPGA major championships
- Chevron Championship: DNP
- Women's PGA C'ship: DNP
- U.S. Women's Open: CUT: 2019, 2020
- Women's British Open: DNP
- Evian Championship: DNP

Achievements and awards
- Sun Belt Conference Freshman of the Year: 2014
- Sun Belt Conference Golfer of the Year: 2016

Fátima Fernández Cano (born 23 October 1995) is a Spanish professional golfer who plays on the LPGA Tour and the Ladies European Tour.

== Early life, amateur and college career ==
Cano was born in Santiago de Compostela, Spain. As a junior player, Cano won the Galicia Championships in 2005. She played college golf at Troy University between 2013 and 2017. While at Troy, she was the Sun Belt Conference individual champion her freshman year. During her junior season in 2016, she finished the season ranked as the #5 player in the NCAA, receiving an at-large bid to the NCAA Regional Qualifier. That same year, she was named Sun Belt Conference Golfer of the Year.

She graduated from Troy with a bachelor's degree in business, as one of the best players in Troy and Sun Belt Conference history.

== Professional career ==
In 2018, Cano turned professional and joined the Symetra Tour. In August 2020, she won her first professional event, the IOA Championship in California. She finished second in the Race for the Card behind Ana Belac to earn LPGA Tour membership for the 2021 season.

In 2021, she was only able to start in one LPGA Tour event, the Volunteers of America Classic where she finished T32, as COVID-19 froze the priority list. Instead she kept playing on the Symetra Tour, where she recorded 10 top-10 finishes including runner-up results at the Symetra Classic, Murphy USA El Dorado Shootout and the Carolina Golf Classic. She again finished second in the Race for the Card, this time behind Lilia Vu, to earn LPGA Tour membership for the 2022 season.

On her way to win the Carlisle Arizona Women's Golf Classic in March 2022, she carded a 61 in round three, to tie the lowest score in Epson Tour history.

Plagued by pain in her arm, Cano made only a single LPGA Tour cut in 2023 and considered early retirement, before finally getting to the root of the problem and having surgery. In 2024, she joined the Ladies European Tour, having tied for 5th at Q-School. In her rookie season she recorded a T-3 at the VP Bank Swiss Ladies Open and a T-4 at the Aramco Team Series - Riyadh. She finished 3rd in the 2024 Epson Tour rankings to regain her full LPGA Tour card for 2025.

== Amateur wins ==
- 2014 Sun Belt Conference Tournament, Chris Banister Classic
- 2015 John Kirk Panther Intercollegiate, Chris Banister Classic
- 2016 Kiawah Island Intercollegiate, Samford Intercollegiate, Henssler Financial Intercollegiate, Rebel Intercollegiate

== Professional wins (3) ==
=== Epson Tour wins (3) ===
No.	Date	Tournament	Winning score	Margin of victory	Runner(s)-up
1	1 May 2020	IOA Championship	−6 (70-65-69=204)	2 strokes	(United States) Anna Redding
2	20 Mar 2022	Carlisle Arizona Women's Golf Classic	−17 (70-70-61-70=271)	3 strokes	(Paraguay) Sofia Garcia (Sweden) Dani Holmqvist (Dominican Republic) Laura Restrepo
3	8 Sep 2024	Guardian Championship	–15 (69-66-67=202)	1 stroke	(Sweden) Ingrid Lindblad

== Team appearances ==
Amateur

- European Ladies' Team Championship (representing Spain): 2015, 2016
