= Sadena Parks =

American professional golfer (born 1990)

Personal information
- Nationality: United States
- Born: May 4, 1990 (age 36) Raleigh, North Carolina, U.S.
- Height: 5 ft 3 in (1.60 m)

Career
- Sport: Golf
- College: University of Washington
- Turned professional: 2013
- Former tours: LPGA Tour; Symetra Tour
- Professional wins: 2

Number of wins by tour
- Epson Tour: 2

Best results in LPGA major championships
- Chevron Championship: DNP
- Women's PGA C'ship: T22: 2015
- U.S. Women's Open: CUT: 2014
- Women's British Open: DNP
- Evian Championship: CUT: 2015

Sadena Parks (born May 4, 1990) is an American professional golfer who played on LPGA Tour. Parks became the first African American to earn her Tour card through the Symetra Tour and just the fifth African American to earn an LPGA Tour card.

== Family and education ==
Parks was born in Raleigh, North Carolina and after her parents divorced she moved with her father to Washington. She attended Bethel High School in Spanaway and spent four seasons at the University of Washington studying American Ethnic Studies.

== Amateur career ==
At the age of 9, Parks joined Classic Club, a club program for young golfers and her father also enrolled her in the Leisure Hour junior golf program in Portland, Oregon. She won the Washington State High School Championship and got runner-up place.

=== Collegiate career ===
==== 2008–09 (freshman) ====
- Played in final seven tournaments, eight overall
- Huskies top finisher and tied for 20th overall at the 2009 NCAA Central Regionals after shooting a 13-over-par 229
- Recorded best round of 74 in second and third round of UNLV Spring Rebel Invite and third round of Lady Buckeye Invite

==== 2009–10 (sophomore) ====
- Played in all 11 tournaments
- Top Husky finisher at the Pac-10 Championship, finishing 13th.
- Huskies second-best finisher three times (Turtle Bay Invitational, Peg Bernard Classic, Longhorn Invitational)
- Recorded best round of 70 in first round of Pac-10 Championship
- Recorded three top-20 finishes on the year (Edean Ihlanfeldt Invitational, Peg Bernard Classic, Pac-10 Championship)

==== 2010–11 (junior) ====
- Had seven top-25 finishes in 12 events this season
- Scoring average of 76.19, ranked second on the team
- Set women's course record at Washington National with a career-low 66 (−6) in the second round of the West Regional
- Her 66 tied for the second lowest round ever by a Husky and was just the fourth time in UW history a golfer has shot 66 or better
- Was UW's top finisher at the NCAA Regional placing 22nd and Pac-10 Championship, tying for 19th
- Career-best 8th-place finish at Peg Barnard Invitational
- Best 54-hole score 219 came in the Edean Ihlanfeldt Invitational at Tacoma Country Club

==== 2011–12 (senior) ====
- Played in 10 out of 12 events, missing two tournaments to concentrate on graduation studies
- Her scoring average of 74.79 was second on the team and ranked as the 8th best average in UW single-season history
- Was the team's top finisher in four events and was second in two others
- Shot a career-low 66 in the first round of the 2011 Stanford Intercollegiate, a score that ties for second lowest ever in UW history
- Shot under-par eight times during the season to lead the team
- Had two top-10 finishes, including a career-best second place in Hawaii at the Rainbow Wahine Invitational
- Notched a career-low score of 213 (−3) in the Rainbow Wahine Invitational
- Shot 2-over-par 218 at the Pacific Coast Championship to lead the Huskies and tie for 17th overall
- Was Washington's low scorer at the NCAA East Regional

== Professional career ==
She went to LPGA qualifying school in 2012 and earned status on the 2013 Symetra Tour. She also participated in a TV reality show Big Break Florida.

On the 2014 Symetra Tour, she won two events and finished fourth on the money list to earn her 2015 LPGA Tour card, only the fifth African American woman to receive a LPGA Tour card.

Parks posed in ESPN The Magazine's "Body Issue" in 2015. In the accompanying article, Parks shared her aspirations and how her dad got her started in golf.

== Professional wins ==
=== Symetra Tour wins ===
- 2014 SEFCU Championship, New England Charity Classic
