= Maria Torres (golfer) =

Puerto Rican professional golfer

Maria Fernanda Torres
Personal information
- Nickname: Marife
- Nationality: Puerto Rico
- Born: August 26, 1994 (age 32) Trujillo Alto, Puerto Rico

Career
- Sport: Golf
- College: University of Florida
- Turned professional: 2017
- Current tour: LPGA Tour (joined 2018)
- Professional wins: 1

Number of wins by tour
- Epson Tour: 1

Best results in LPGA major championships
- Chevron Championship: T11: 2020
- Women's PGA C'ship: CUT: 2018, 2019, 2020, 2021
- U.S. Women's Open: T60: 2019
- Women's British Open: T24: 2019
- Evian Championship: T26: 2018

Achievements and awards
- SEC Golfer of the Year: 2016
Medal record
Central American and Caribbean Games
| Silver medal – second place | 2023 El Salvador | Individual |
| Silver medal – second place | 2026 Santo Domingo | Individual |

Maria Fernanda Torres (born August 26, 1994) is a Puerto Rican professional golfer. She became the first player from Puerto Rico to earn full LPGA Tour membership in 2017.

== Amateur career ==
Torres represented Puerto Rico at the Espirito Santo Trophy in 2014 and 2016, and at the Pan American Games in 2015. She won the Caribbean Amateur Championship in 2012, 2014 and 2017.

She graduated from the University of Florida in 2017 with a degree in Family, Youth and Community Science. She had five wins while playing for Florida Gators women's golf, and set the school record for lowest single-season scoring average (71.71 in 2017). She won the SEC Championship and was named SEC Golfer of the Year in 2016.

== Professional career ==
In late 2017, Torres turned professional after the LPGA Final Qualifying Tournament. She won a three-hole aggregate playoff at to secure the 20th qualifying spot to earn a LPGA Tour card for the 2018 season, becoming the first player from Puerto Rico to earn full membership on the LPGA Tour.

On the 2018 LPGA Tour, she made 14 cuts in 24 events. She recorded two top-10 results and finished sixth in the Rookie of the Year ranking. In 2019, she recorded a career best finish of T4 at the Indy Women in Tech Championship.

Torres qualified for the Tokyo Summer Olympics in 2021.

== Amateur wins ==
- 2012 Junior at Innisbrook, Caribbean Junior Championship, Caribbean Amateur Championship, Junior Orange Bowl International
- 2013 PRGA Junior Island Championship
- 2014 Caribbean Amateur Championship
- 2015 The Alamo Invitational
- 2016 SEC Championship
- 2017 SunTrust Gator Invite, Briar's Creek Invitational, Caribbean Amateur Championship

== Professional wins ==
=== Epson Tour wins ===
- 2022 Guardian Championship

== Results in LPGA majors ==
Results not in chronological order.

| Tournament | 2018 | 2019 | 2020 | 2021 |
|---|---|---|---|---|
| ANA Inspiration | | CUT | T11 | T47 |
| U.S. Women's Open | | T60 | CUT | |
| Women's PGA Championship | CUT | CUT | CUT | CUT |
| The Evian Championship | T26 | CUT | NT | |
| Women's British Open | | T24 | T64 | |

Did not play

CUT = missed the half-way cut
NT = no tournament
T = tied

== Team appearances ==
Amateur

- Espirito Santo Trophy (representing Puerto Rico): 2014, 2016
- Pan American Games (representing Puerto Rico): 2015
