= 2020 Symetra Tour =

The 2020 Symetra Tour was a series of professional women's golf tournaments held from March through October 2020 in the United States. The Symetra Tour is the second-tier women's professional golf tour in the United States and is the "official developmental tour" of the LPGA Tour. It was previously known as the Futures Tour.

== Schedule and results ==
A number of tournament were postponed or cancelled due to the COVID-19 pandemic.

The number in parentheses after winners' names show the player's total number of official money, individual event wins on the Symetra Tour including that event.

Date	Tournament	Location	Winner	WWGR points	Purse ($)
Mar 6–8	Florida's Natural Charity Classic	Florida	(United States) Janie Jackson (1)	4	125,000
~~Apr 2–4~~	Windsor Golf Classic	California	Cancelled	–	150,000
~~May 20–23~~	Zimmer Biomet Championship	Alabama	Cancelled	–	300,000
~~May 29–31~~	The CDPHP Open	New York	Cancelled	–	150,000
~~Jun 19–21~~	Island Resort Championship	Michigan	Cancelled	–	200,000
~~Jul 8–10~~ (Note: Tournament rescheduled from Jun 26–28.)	Prasco Charity Championship	Ohio	Cancelled	–	175,000
~~Jul 9–11~~	Donald Ross Classic	Indiana	Cancelled	–	225,000
~~Jul 16–19~~	Danielle Downey Credit Union Classic	New York	Cancelled	–	175,000
July 24–26	FireKeepers Casino Hotel Championship	Michigan	(China) Ruixin Liu (4)	3	175,000
~~Aug 7–9~~	PHC Classic	Wisconsin	Cancelled	–	125,000
~~Aug 14–16~~	Garden City Charity Classic	Kansas	Cancelled	–	175,000
Aug 14–16	Founders Tribute at Longbow	Arizona	(United States) Sarah White (1)	3	125,000
Aug 21–23 (Note: Tournament rescheduled from Mar 27–29.)	IOA Championship	California	(Spain) Fátima Fernández Cano (1)	3	125,000
~~Aug 28–30~~	Circling Raven Championship	Idaho	Cancelled	–	200,000
~~Sep 3–5~~	Copper Rock Championship	Utah	Cancelled	–	200,000
Sep 4–6 (Note: Tournament rescheduled from Jun 12–14.)	Four Winds Invitational	Indiana	(United States) Kim Kaufman (3)	3	150,000
~~Sep 18–20~~	Guardian Championship	Alabama	Cancelled	–	175,000
Sep 25–27	IOA Golf Classic	Florida	(United States) Laura Wearn (3)	3	175,000
Oct 1–4 (Note: Tournament rescheduled from May 13–15.)	Symetra Classic	North Carolina	(Chinese Taipei) Peiyun Chien (2)	3	175,000
Oct 15–17	Mission Inn Resort and Club Championship	Florida	(Finland) Matilda Castren (1)	3	125,000
~~Oct 22–24~~ (Note: Tournament rescheduled from May 7–9.)	IOA Invitational	Georgia	Cancelled	–	150,000
Oct 28–31	Carolina Golf Classic	North Carolina	(Slovenia) Ana Belac (1)	3	200,000
Nov 3–6 (Note: Tournament rescheduled from Oct 1–4.)	Symetra Tour Championship	North Carolina	(Sweden) Frida Kinhult (1)	3	250,000

== Leading money winners ==
Normally, the top ten money winners at the end of the season would have gained fully exempt cards on the LPGA Tour for the 2021 season. However, due to the COVID-19 pandemic, only the top five will gain cards. Those players will also receive entry in the 2020 U.S. Women's Open.

Rank	Player	Country	Events	Prize money ($)
1	Ana Belac	Slovenia	9	49,081
2	Fátima Fernández Cano	Spain	8	48,069
3	Kim Kaufman	United States	10	44,459
4	Frida Kinhult	Sweden	8	42,057
5	Janie Jackson	United States	10	41,723

== See also ==
- 2020 LPGA Tour
- 2020 in golf
