= Guardian Championship =

Golf tournament in Alabama

Tournament information
- Location: Prattville, Alabama
- Established: 2017
- Course: Capitol Hill Golf Club
- Par: 72
- Length: 6,663 yards (6,093 m)
- Tour: Epson Tour
- Format: Stroke play
- Prize fund: $250,000
- Month played: September

Current champion
- (Spain) Carla Bernat

The Guardian Championship is a tournament on the Epson Tour, the LPGA's developmental tour. It has been a part of the tour's schedule since 2017. It is held at Capitol Hill Golf Club in Prattville, Alabama.

Title sponsor is the Guardian Credit Union, based in Montgomery, Alabama.

The 2020 tournament was cancelled due to the COVID-19 pandemic.

== Winners ==
Year	Date	Winner	Country	Score	Margin of victory	Runner(s)-up	Purse ($)	Winner's share ($)
2026	Sep 13	Carla Bernat	Spain	200 (−16)	2 strokes	(China) Michelle Zhang	250,000	37,500
2025	Sep 14	Melanie Green	United States	203 (−13)	Playoff	(United States) Gianna Clemente (a)	250,000	37,500
2024	Sep 8	Fátima Fernández Cano	Spain	202 (−14)	1 stroke	(Sweden) Ingrid Lindblad	262,500	39,375
2023	Sep 17	Cydney Clanton	United States	199 (−17)	2 strokes	(China) Miranda Wang	200,000	30,000
2022	Sep 19	Maria Torres	Puerto Rico	202 (−14)	2 strokes	(Norway) Celine Borge (Philippines) Clariss Guce	200,000	30,000
2021	Sep 19	Janie Jackson	United States	132 (−12) (Note: Reduced to 36 holes due to adverse weather conditions.)	4 strokes	(United States) Sierra Brooks (United States) Katelyn Dambaugh	175,000	26,250
2020	Sep 20	No tournament					175,000	26,250
2019	Sep 22	Laura Restrepo	Panama	202 (−14)	1 stroke	(United States) Jenny Coleman (United States) Gigi Stoll	175,000	26,250
2018	Sep 23	Kendall Dye	United States	200 (−16)	1 stroke	(South Korea) Kwak Min-seo (China) Ruixin Liu	160,000	24,000
2017	Sep 24	Lindsey Weaver	United States	204 (−12)	1 stroke	(China) Liu Yu	100,000	15,000
