= Hartford HealthCare Women's Championship =

Golf tournament in Connecticut

Tournament information
- Location: Avon, Connecticut
- Established: 2023
- Course: Golf Club at Avon
- Par: 71
- Length: 6,439 yards (5,888 m)
- Tour: Epson Tour
- Format: Stroke play
- Prize fund: $250,000
- Month played: July

Current champion
- (United States) Christine Wang

The Hartford HealthCare Women's Championship is a tournament on the Epson Tour, the LPGA's developmental tour. It was first held at Great River Golf Club in Milford, Connecticut in 2023. It moved to the Golf Club at Avon in Avon, Connecticut in 2026.

In 2023, Jenny Bae won the inaugural tournament in a seven-hole playoff against Kang Min-ji and Ssu-Chia Cheng, for her first Epson Tour victory.

== Winners ==
Year	Date	Winner	Score	Margin of victory	Runner(s)-up	Purse ($)	Winner's share ($)
2026	Jul 26	(United States) Christine Wang	−13 (68-69-66-68=271)	1 stroke	(Malaysia) Mirabel Ting	250,000	37,500
2025	Jul 13	(United States) Gina Kim	−14 (64-69-73-68=274)	6 strokes	(United States) Camille Boyd (United States) Melanie Green	225,000	33,750
2024	Jul 14	(United States) Daniela Iacobelli	−16 (66-67-67=200)	1 stroke	(United States) Amelia Lewis	262,500	39,375
2023	Jul 16	(United States) Jenny Bae	−11 (69-66-70=205)	Playoff	(Taiwan) Ssu-Chia Cheng (South Korea) Kang Min-ji	200,000	30,000
