= Bailey Tardy =

American professional golfer (born 1996)

Personal information
- Full name: Madison Bailey Tardy
- Nationality: United States
- Born: August 8, 1996 (age 30)
- Height: 5 ft 8 in (1.73 m)

Career
- Sport: Golf
- College: University of Georgia
- Turned professional: 2018
- Current tour: LPGA Tour (joined 2023)
- Former tour: Epson Tour (joined 2019)
- Professional wins: 2

Number of wins by tour
- LPGA Tour: 1
- Epson Tour: 1

Best results in LPGA major championships
- Chevron Championship: CUT: 2023, 2024, 2025, 2026
- Women's PGA C'ship: CUT: 2023, 2024, 2025
- U.S. Women's Open: T4: 2023
- Women's British Open: T78: 2024
- Evian Championship: CUT: 2023, 2024

Achievements and awards
- SEC Freshman of the Year: 2016

Madison Bailey Tardy (born August 8, 1996) is an American professional golfer and LPGA Tour player.

== Early life, college and amateur career ==
Tardy enjoyed a successful junior career, and was an AJGA Rolex All-American in 2013, 2014 and 2015, and also competed in the Wyndham Cup each of those years. She played in the 2013 Symetra Tour Championship where she finished tied 27th, and was medalist at the 2013 U.S. Girls' Junior.

Tardy qualified for the U.S. Women's Open in 2014, 2016 and 2017 while still an amateur. In 2017, she was tied 13th after shooting an opening 70, but missed the cut following a second round 82. She also won the 2015 North and South Women's Amateur. In 2018, she finished as low amateur at the Georgia Women's Open, placing third overall after shooting a 2-under 142, and won the Georgia State Amateur wire-to-wire by an eight-stroke gap after shooting an 8-under 208.

Tardy played collegiate golf at the University of Georgia and was named the 2016 SEC Freshman of the Year. She played in the 2016 Curtis Cup alongside Andrea Lee and finished with a 3–2 record, although Great Britain and Ireland won 11.5–8.5 at Dún Laoghaire Golf Club in Ireland.

== Professional career ==
Tardy turned professional following the fall semester in 2018 after she earned Epson Tour membership at LPGA Q-Series, but did remain in school to graduate from UGA in May 2019.

She finished sixth on the 2020 money list, narrowly missing out on LPGA Tour promotion by just $343. In 2021, her first professional win came with a three-shot victory at the Copper Rock Championship, but she again missed out on promotion, finishing 12th on the money list with 10 cards on offer. In 2022, she recorded four top-five finishes on the Epson Tour before finally earning her LPGA card by finishing second at LPGA Q-Series.

In her rookie season on the LPGA Tour, she held the second round lead at the 2023 U.S. Women's Open before finishing tied 4th, collecting $482,136.

On March 10, 2024, Tardy won her first LPGA title at the Blue Bay LPGA by 4 strokes over Sarah Schmelzel. In November 2024, Tardy won Rolex First-Time Winners award.

== Amateur wins ==
- 2012 AJGA Junior at River Landing, Junior All-Star at Ocala
- 2013 Georgia Junior Championship, Arrowhead Junior at The Bluffs, Trusted Choice Big I National Championship
- 2015 North and South Women's Amateur, Windy City Collegiate Championship
- 2016 NCAA Bryan Regional
- 2018 Georgia Women's State Amateur

== Professional wins (2) ==
=== LPGA Tour wins (1) ===
No.	Date	Tournament	Winning score	To par	Margin of victory	Runner-up	Winner's share ($)
1	Mar 10, 2024	Blue Bay LPGA	68-70-66-65=269	−19	4 strokes	(United States) Sarah Schmelzel	330,000

=== Epson Tour wins (1) ===
No.	Date	Tournament	Winning score	Margin of victory	Runners-up
1	Apr 24, 2021	Copper Rock Championship	−10 (66–70–70=206)	3 strokes	(Canada) Maude-Aimée LeBlanc (United States) Samantha Wagner

== Results in LPGA majors ==
Results not in chronological order.

Tournament	2014	2015	2016	2017	2018	2019	2020	2021	2022	2023	2024	2025	2026
Chevron Championship										CUT	CUT	CUT	CUT
U.S. Women's Open	CUT		CUT	CUT						T4	CUT		
Women's PGA Championship										CUT	CUT	CUT	
The Evian Championship							NT			CUT	CUT		
Women's British Open										CUT	T78		

Top 10
Did not play

CUT = missed the half-way cut
NT = no tournament
T = tied

=== Summary ===
Tournament	Wins	2nd	3rd	Top-5	Top-10	Top-25	Events	Cuts made
Chevron Championship	0	0	0	0	0	0	4	0
U.S. Women's Open	0	0	0	1	1	1	5	1
Women's PGA Championship	0	0	0	0	0	0	3	0
The Evian Championship	0	0	0	0	0	0	2	0
Women's British Open	0	0	0	0	0	0	2	1
Totals	0	0	0	1	1	1	16	2

== LPGA Tour career summary ==
Year	Tournaments played	Cuts made*	Wins	2nds	3rds	Top 10s	Best finish	Earnings ($)	Money list rank	Scoring average	Scoring rank
2014	1	0	0	0	0	0	MC	n/a	n/a	79.50	n/a
2015	Did not play										
2016	1	0	0	0	0	0	MC	n/a	n/a	79.00	n/a
2017	1	0	0	0	0	0	MC	n/a	n/a	76.00	n/a
2018	Did not play										
2019	Did not play										
2020	1	0	0	0	0	0	MC	n/a	n/a	72.50	n/a
2021	Did not play										
2022	Did not play										
2023	21	12	0	0	0	1	T4	581,491	51	72.54	123
2024	23	8	1	0	0	3	1	652,086	60	72.39	123
2025	20	9	0	0	0	0	T22	104,385	128	72.60	126
Totals^	64 (2023)	29 (2023)	1	0	0	4	1	1,337,962	283		

^ Official as of 2025 season
* Includes matchplay and other tournaments without a cut.

== World ranking ==
Position in Women's World Golf Rankings at the end of each calendar year.

Year	Ranking	Source
2019	831	
2020	510	
2021	442	
2022	442	
2023	170	
2024	91	
2025	201	

== U.S. national team appearances ==
Amateur

- Curtis Cup: 2016
