= Wildhorse Ladies Golf Classic =

Golf tournament in Alabama

Tournament information
- Location: Pendleton, Oregon
- Established: 2022
- Course: Wildhorse Resort & Casino
- Par: 72
- Length: 6,643 yards (6,074 m)
- Tour: Epson Tour
- Format: Stroke play
- Prize fund: $250,000
- Month played: August

Tournament record score
- Aggregate: 195 Pornanong Phatlum (2024)
- To par: −21 as above

Current champion
- (United States) Megha Ganne

The Wildhorse Ladies Golf Classic is a tournament on the Epson Tour, the LPGA's developmental tour. It has been a part of the tour's schedule since 2022.

The tournament is held at the Wildhorse Resort & Casino in Pendleton, Oregon.

Daniela Iacobelli won the inaugural event for her fourth Epson Tour title.

== Winners ==
Year	Date	Winner	Country	Score	Margin of victory	Runner-up	Purse ($)	Winner's share ($)
2026	Aug 23	Megha Ganne	United States	197 (−19)	Playoff	(Thailand) Cholcheva Wongras	250,000	37,500
2025	Aug 17	Erika Hara	Japan	198 (−18)	3 strokes	(United States) Sabrina Iqbal	250,000	37,500
2024	Aug 18	Pornanong Phatlum	Thailand	195 (−21)	2 strokes	(United States) Amy Lee	262,500	39,375
2023	Aug 20	Yin Xiaowen	China	132 (−12)	3 strokes	(United States) Alana Uriell	200,000	30,000
2022	Sep 4	Daniela Iacobelli	United States	198 (−18)	3 strokes	(Thailand) Pavarisa Yoktuan	200,000	30,000
