= Ana Belac =

Slovenian professional golfer (born 1997)

Personal information
- Nationality: Slovenia
- Born: 28 January 1997 (age 29) Kranj, Slovenia
- Height: 5 ft 4 in (163 cm)

Career
- Sport: Golf
- College: Duke University
- Turned professional: 2020
- Current tour: LPGA Tour (joined 2021)
- Former tour: Symetra Tour
- Professional wins: 1

Number of wins by tour
- Epson Tour: 1

Best results in LPGA major championships
- Chevron Championship: DNP
- Women's PGA C'ship: T69: 2025
- U.S. Women's Open: T34: 2026
- Women's British Open: CUT: 2021
- Evian Championship: T50: 2021

Achievements and awards
- Symetra Tour Player of the Year: 2020
- Symetra Tour Rookie of the Year: 2020
Medal record
Mediterranean Games
Bronze medal – third place	2018 Tarragona	Women's team

Ana Belac (born 28 January 1997) is a Slovenian professional golfer. She won both the 2020 Symetra Tour Rookie of the Year and the Symetra Tour Player of the Year, and was the first Slovenian to join the LPGA Tour.

== Amateur career ==
Belac was a top-ranked female junior golfer in Slovenia and won the Leone di San Marco in 2013 and 2015. She represented Slovenia in the European Ladies' Team Championship on five occasions and in the Espirito Santo Trophy in 2012 and 2014. She competed in the European Young Masters from 2010 to 2013, where she was placed second in 2012.

She finished 17th in the 2014 Youth Olympic Games in Nanjing, China and at the 2018 Mediterranean Games she won bronze medal with Vida Obersnel and Pia Babnik in the women's team event.

Belac played college golf at Duke University where she was a two-time All-ACC selection and earned co-medalist honors at 2017 Landfall Tradition and 2019 East Lake Cup. She was a member of the victorious International Team at the 2019 Arnold Palmer Cup and led the Blue Devils to the 2019 NCAA Championship team title, winning her matches 3–0. She was named a 2020 WGCA First Team All-American.

== Professional career ==
Belac turned pro in the spring of 2020 when her senior season at Duke was cut short by the coronavirus pandemic. She won the Symetra Tour's Carolina Golf Classic and secured victory in the Volvik Race For the Card to earn a LPGA Tour card for the 2021 season.

== Amateur wins ==
- 2013 Leone di San Marco
- 2015 Leone di San Marco
- 2017 The Landfall Tradition
- 2019 East Lake Cup

== Professional wins (1) ==
=== Symetra Tour wins (1) ===
No.	Date	Tournament	Winning score	To par	Margin of victory	Runner-up
1	31 Oct 2020	Carolina Golf Classic	66-71-70-74=281	−7	4 strokes	(United States) Allison Emrey

== Team appearances ==
Amateur

- European Young Masters (representing Slovenia): 2010, 2011, 2012, 2013
- Espirito Santo Trophy (representing Slovenia): 2012, 2014, 2016
- European Ladies' Team Championship (representing Slovenia): 2011, 2013, 2014, 2015, 2016
- Arnold Palmer Cup (representing the International team): 2019 (winners)
