= Alena Sharp =

Canadian professional golfer (born 1981)

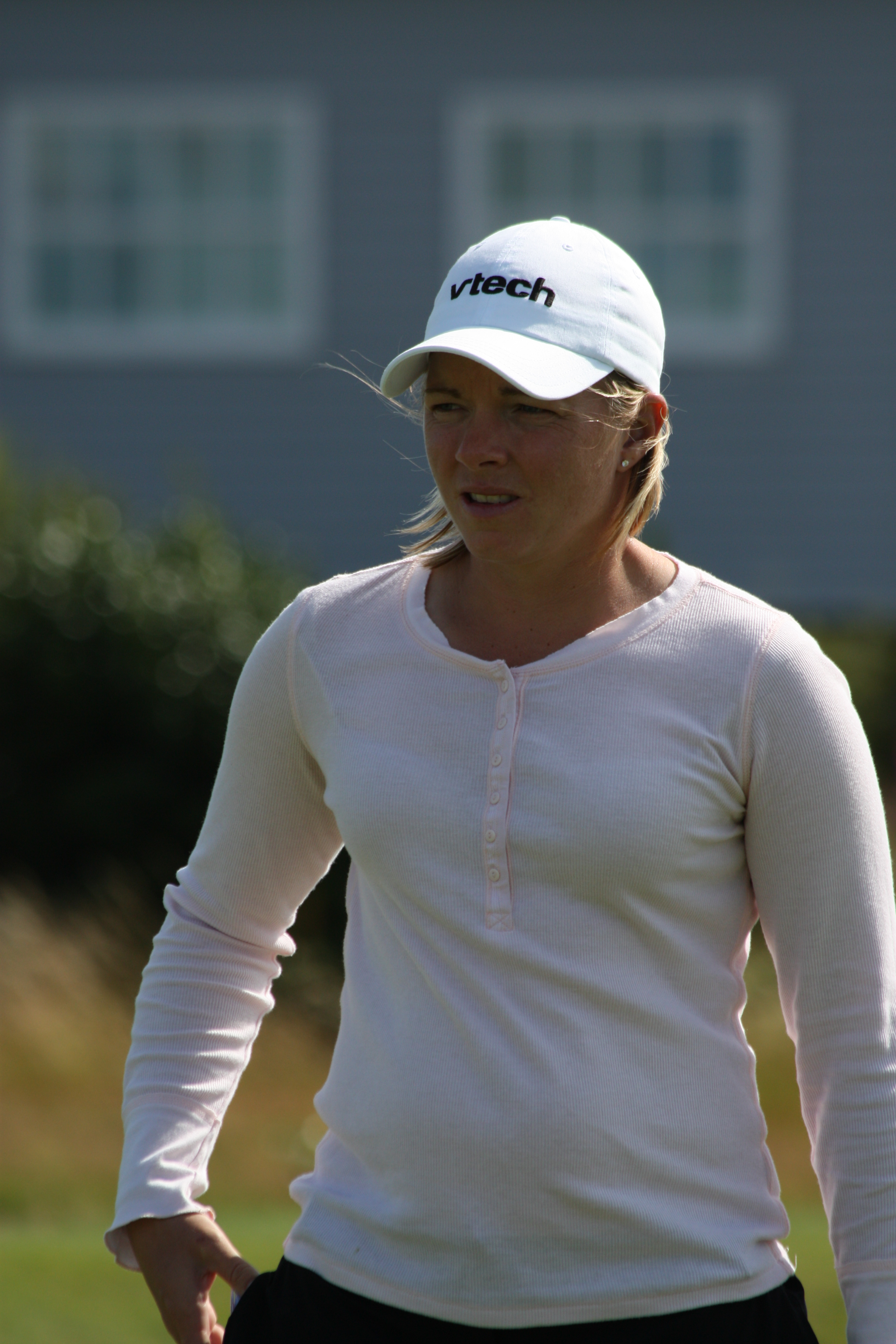
- Sharp in 2009

Personal information
- Nationality: Canada
- Born: March 7, 1981 (age 45) Hamilton, Ontario, Canada
- Height: 5 ft 6 in (168 cm)

Career
- Sport: Golf
- College: New Mexico State University
- Turned professional: 2003
- Current tours: LPGA Tour (joined 2005); Symetra Tour (2004–05, 2013–14)
- Professional wins: 9

Number of wins by tour
- Epson Tour: 1
- Other: 8

Best results in LPGA major championships
- Chevron Championship: T17: 2019
- Women's PGA C'ship: T22: 2016
- U.S. Women's Open: T21: 2016
- Women's British Open: T22: 2020
- Evian Championship: T37: 2018

Achievements and awards
- Edith Cummings Munson Golf Award: 2003
Medal record
Pan American Games
Bronze medal – third place	2023 Santiago	Individual

Alena Sharp (born March 7, 1981) is a Canadian professional golfer currently playing on the LPGA Tour.

== Career ==
A graduate of New Mexico State University, where she played on the golf team, Sharp turned professional in 2003, playing two seasons on the Futures Tour and on other minor tours before joining the LPGA Tour in 2005.

In 2017, Sharp came out as a lesbian.

== Professional wins (10) ==
=== Epson Tour wins (2) ===
- 2014 Visit Mesa Gateway Classic
- 2023 Champions Fore Change Invitational

=== Canadian Women's Tour (2) ===
- 2004 (1) Canadian PGA Women's Championship
- 2005 (1) Canadian PGA Women's Championship

=== West Coast Ladies Golf Tour (4) ===
- 2004 (4) Inland Empire Open, The International, Estrella Summer Classic, Vistal Classic

=== Cactus Tour (2) ===
- 2009 (2) two wins

== Team appearances ==
Amateur

- Espirito Santo Trophy (representing Canada): 2000

Professional

- World Cup (representing Canada): 2008
