= Forest Oaks Country Club =

Golf course in Greensboro, North Carolina

The Forest Oaks Country Club is located in Greensboro, North Carolina. It is primarily known for its golf course with the PGA Tour event held there from 1977 through 2007: the Wyndham Championship, formerly the Greater Greensboro Chrysler Classic, and the Greater Greensboro Open (GGO). The club was established in 1962 and has recently converted to a semi-private facility.

== Amenities ==
The golf course at Forest Oaks has five sets of tees making it accessible for golfers of varying skill levels. In addition, it has a six lane swimming pool, six lighted clay tennis courts, and six pickleball courts. It also offers the standard range of country club resources: meals and drinks at the clubhouse bar and restaurant, golf and tennis lessons, and the ability to host private events.

== Golf course ==
The course at Forest Oaks was originally designed by Ellis Maples and opened in 1962. It underwent only minor alterations until 2002, when golfer Davis Love III was hired to redesign it. The fairways are grassed by Tift Sport Bermuda grass and the greens with a mix of A4 and A1 bentgrass. Par for the course is 72 and it has a slope rating of 135. Golf World Magazine gave the new course a 4.7 rating out of a possible 5.0.
