= Jessica Porvasnik =

American professional golfer (born 1995)

Personal information
- Nationality: United States
- Born: June 23, 1995 (age 31) Hinckley, Ohio, U.S.

Career
- Sport: Golf
- College: Ohio State University
- Turned professional: 2018
- Current tour: LPGA Tour
- Professional wins: 1

Best results in LPGA major championships
- Chevron Championship: T55: 2026
- Women's PGA C'ship: 67th: 2026
- U.S. Women's Open: CUT: 2014
- Women's British Open: DNP
- Evian Championship: DNP

Jessica Porvasnik (born 21 June 1995) is an American professional golfer. She played collegiate golf at Ohio State. In 2018, Porvasnik turned professional, later qualifying for the LPGA Tour in 2025.

== Amateur career ==
Porvasnik is from Hinckley, Ohio. She first began playing golf at age 12. She progressed quickly, winning the 2011 and 2012 Cleveland Junior Open golf tournament before her 17th birthday.

At Highland High School, Porvasnik won the 2012 Ohio Division 1 state individual title.

She went on to play college golf at Ohio State, where in 2014 she was named Big Ten Freshman of the Year and Big Ten Player of the Year. That year, she qualified for the U.S. Women's Open but she missed the cut.

== Professional career ==
After college, Porvasnik turned professional. In 2018, she won the DCM PGA Women's Championship of Canada, her first professional win outside of the state of Ohio.

In 2020, she was named player of the decade for Medina County girl's golf.

In 2021, she qualified for stage 2 of Q-School, a qualifying series for the Epson Tour.

In 2022, she joined the Epson Tour. Her first full season on the tour was in 2022. That year, she finished the Race for the Card in 79th place. In 2023, she was named to the Medina County Sports Hall of Fame.

In 2024, Porvasnik was disqualified from the Carlisle Arizona Women's Open alongside Joo Soo-bin after accidentally signing the wrong scorecards.

Porvasnik earned her LPGA Tour card in 2025, after finishing fourth in the Epson Tour.

== Amateur wins ==
- 2011 Cleveland Junior Open
- 2012 Cleveland Junior Girls Open
- 2013 The Memorial Junior, PGA Junior Series Purdue University
- 2014 Westbrook Invitational, Big Ten Championship
- 2016 Harder Hall Invitational, Orlando International Amateur Championship

== Professional wins (1) ==
- 2018 DCM PGA Women's Championship of Canada
