= Lauren Morris =

American professional golfer (born 1997)

Personal information
- Full name: Lauren Stephenson Morris
- Nationality: United States
- Born: July 13, 1997 (age 29) Greenville, South Carolina, U.S.
- Height: 5 ft 3 in (160 cm)

Career
- Sport: Golf
- College: Clemson University; University of Alabama
- Turned professional: 2018
- Current tours: LPGA Tour; Epson Tour
- Professional wins: 1

Number of wins by tour
- Epson Tour: 1

Best results in LPGA major championships
- Chevron Championship: T44: 2019, 2022
- Women's PGA C'ship: T9: 2020
- U.S. Women's Open: T30: 2020, 2021
- Women's British Open: 58th: 2021
- Evian Championship: T12: 2021

Achievements and awards
- Epson Tour Player of the Year: 2024

Lauren Morris (born July 13, 1997) is an American professional golfer. She played under her maiden name, Lauren Stephenson, prior to 2025.

== Amateur career ==
Stephenson played her college golf at Clemson University (one year) and the University of Alabama (two years).

She also competed at the 2018 Curtis Cup and the 2018 Arnold Palmer Cup.

== Professional career ==
Stephenson turned professional in 2018 and finished T-8 at the LPGA Tour's Q-Series to earn her 2019 tour card. She made 11 cuts in 20 events in 2019 to retain her card. She finished tied for 9th at the 2020 Women's PGA Championship, qualifying her for the 2020 U.S. Women's Open. She is sponsored by Carlisle Companies. Playing on both the LPGA Tour and Epson Tour in 2024, she won the Twin Bridges Championship on the Epson Tour and earned Epson Tour Player of the Year honors.

== Amateur wins ==
- 2012 Golf Pride Junior Classic
- 2013 TaylorMade-Adidas Junior All-Star at Chateau Elan, Hank Haney IJGA Junior Open
- 2014 AJGA Girls Championship
- 2015 Dixie Amateur
- 2016 Eastern Amateur Championship
- 2017 Mason Rudolph Championship
- 2018 Liz Murphy Collegiate Classic

== Professional wins ==
=== Epson Tour wins ===
- 2024 Twin Bridges Championship

== Results in LPGA majors ==
Results not in chronological order.

Tournament	2016	2017	2018	2019	2020	2021	2022	2023	2024
Chevron Championship				T44			T44	T67	
U.S. Women's Open	CUT	T41			T30	T30			CUT
Women's PGA Championship				T21	T9	T40	WD	T68	
The Evian Championship				CUT	NT	T12	CUT		
Women's British Open				CUT		58	CUT		

Top 10
Did not play

CUT = missed the half-way cut
WD = withdrew
NT = no tournament
T = tied

== LPGA Tour career summary ==
Year	Tournaments played	Cuts made*	Wins	2nd	3rd	Top 10s	Best finish	Earnings ($)	Money list rank	Scoring average	Scoring rank
2016	1	0	0	0	0	0	CUT	n/a	n/a	76.00	n/a
2017	1	1	0	0	0	0	T41	n/a	n/a	73.00	n/a
2018	Did not play										
2019	20	11	0	0	0	1	T8	145,628	90	71.53	70
2020	13	8	0	0	0	1	T9	153,018	70	72.50	88
2021	22	17	0	0	0	2	T6	432,155	49	71.00	50
2022	24	16	0	0	0	1	T8	257,842	83	71.34	70
2023	18	10	0	0	0	0	T15	121,554	121	72.26	113
2024	4	0	0	0	0	0	CUT	0	n/a	73.75	n/a
2025	13	4	0	0	0	0	T30	33,162	157	72.60	127
Totals^	116	67	0	0	0	5	T6	1,143,359	315		

^ Official as of 2025 season
* Includes matchplay and other tournaments without a cut.

== World ranking ==
Position in Women's World Golf Rankings at the end of each calendar year.

Year	Ranking	Source
2017	545	
2018	787	
2019	208	
2020	111	
2021	91	
2022	131	
2023	271	
2024	265	
2025	500	

== U.S. national team appearances ==
Amateur

- Curtis Cup: 2018 (winners)
- Arnold Palmer Cup: 2018 (winners)
