= Casella Golf Championship =

Golf tournament

Tournament information
- Location: Albany, New York, U.S.
- Established: 1984
- Course: Pinehaven Country Club
- Par: 71
- Length: 6,080 yards (5,560 m)
- Tour: Epson Tour
- Format: Stroke play
- Prize fund: $200,000
- Month played: July

Tournament record score
- Aggregate: 199 Seon-Hwa Lee (2005); 199 Sadena Parks (2014)
- To par: −14 Seon-Hwa Lee (2005) −14 Sadena Parks (2014)

Current champion
- (United States) Briana Chacon

The Casella Golf Championship is an annual golf tournament for professional women golfers on the Epson Tour, the LPGA's developmental tour. The event has been played since 1984 and is held in the Albany, New York area.

In 2010 and 2011, the title sponsor was Price Chopper, a chain of supermarkets headquartered in Schenectady, New York. The presenting sponsors in 2012 were SEFCU and Sunmark, credit unions in the Albany area, and Burns-Fazzi, Brock, a credit union benefits consulting company. SEFCU became title sponsor in 2014 and in 2015 Fuccillo Kia with Billy Fuccillo stepped in. In 2019 Capital District Physicians' Health Plan, Inc. (CDPHP) became title sponsor. The venue changed to Pinehaven Country Club and the tournament purse rose to $175,000 in 2021.

The tournament was a 54-hole event, as are most Symetra Tour tournaments, and includes pre-tournament pro-am opportunities, in which local amateur golfers can play with the professional golfers from the Tour as a benefit for local charities.

Tournament names through the years:

- 2000–2002: Capital Region Futures Classic
- 2003: GE Futures Professional Golf Classic
- 2004–2005: The Albany Futures Golf Classic
- 2006–2009: ILOVENY Championship
- 2010–2011: Price Chopper Tour Championship
- 2012: The Credit Union Challenge presented by SEFCU, Sunmark, and BFB Benefits
- 2013: Credit Union Challenge
- 2014: SEFCU Championship at Capital Hills
- 2015–2016: Fuccillo Kia Championship at Capital Hills
- 2017–2018: Fuccillo Kia Classic of NY
- 2019–2020: The CDPHP Open
- 2021–2024: Twin Bridges Championship
- 2025: Casella Golf Championship

== Winners ==
Year	Dates	Champion	Country	Score	Tournament location	Purse ($)	Winner's share ($)
2025	Jul 20	Briana Chacon	United States	204 (−9)	Pinehaven Country Club	200,000	30,000
2024	Jul 21	Lauren Stephenson	United States	204 (−9)	Pinehaven Country Club	237,500	35,625
2023	Jul 23	Jenny Bae	United States	207 (−6) (Note: Tournament won in a sudden-death playoff.)	Pinehaven Country Club	200,000	30,000
2022	Jul 10	Lucy Li	United States	203 (−10)	Pinehaven Country Club	200,000	30,000
2021	Jul 28	Lilia Vu	United States	205 (−8)	Pinehaven Country Club	175,000	26,250
2020	May 31	Tournament cancelled (Note: Tournament cancelled due to the COVID-19 pandemic.)			Capital Hills at Albany	125,000	18,750
2019	Jul 28	Robynn Ree	United States	200 (−13)	Capital Hills at Albany	125,000	18,750
2018	Jul 29	Kendall Dye	United States	132 (−10) (Note: Tournament reduced to 36 holes due to adverse weather conditions.)	Capital Hills at Albany	125,000	18,750
2017	Jun 4	Nanna Koerstz Madsen	Denmark	205 (−8)	Capital Hills at Albany	125,000	18,750
2016	Jun 5	Jackie Stoelting	United States	204 (−9)	Capital Hills at Albany	125,000	18,750
2015	Jul 26	Breanna Elliott	Australia	200 (−13)	Capital Hills at Albany	100,000	15,000
2014	Jul 27	Sadena Parks	United States	199 (−14)	Capital Hills at Albany	100,000	15,000
2013	Jul 14	Wei-Ling Hsu	Taiwan	202 (−11)	Capital Hills at Albany	100,000	15,000
2012	Aug 5	Jaclyn Sweeney	United States	203 (−10)	Capital Hills at Albany	100,000	15,000
2011	Sep 11	Sydnee Michaels	United States	202 (−8)	Capital Hills at Albany	120,000	16,800
2010	Sep 5	Cindy LaCrosse	United States	208 (−5)	Capital Hills at Albany	120,000	16,800
2009	Sep 6	Song Yi Choi	South Korea	205 (−8)	Capital Hills at Albany	110,000	15,400
2008	Sep 7	Sarah Jane Kenyon	Australia	204 (−9)	Capital Hills at Albany	100,000	14,000
2007	Sep 9	Onnarin Sattayabanphot	Thailand	210 (−3)	Capital Hills at Albany	100,000	14,000
2006	Sep 10	Ji Min Jeong	South Korea	206 (−7)	Capital Hills at Albany	85,000	11,900
2005	Jul 17	Seon-Hwa Lee	South Korea	199 (−14)	Capital Hills at Albany	70,000	9,800
2004	Aug 15	Nicole Perrot	Chile	203 (−10)	Capital Hills at Albany	70,000	9,800
2003	Jul 20	Lindsey Wright	Australia	205 (−8)	Orchard Creek Golf Club	60,000	8,400
2002	Jul 7	Miriam Nagl	Brazil	210 (−3)	Orchard Creek Golf Club	60,000	8,400
2001	Jul 8	Angela Buzminski	Canada	208 (−8)	Western Turnpike Golf Course	60,000	8,400
2000	Jul 9	Dodie Mazzuca	United States	218 (+2)	Western Turnpike Golf Course	50,000	7,000
1999	No tournament						
1998		Michele Vinieratos	United States	203 (−13)			5,300
1997		Heather Daly-Donofrio	United States	208 (−8)			5,300
1996		Stephanie Comstock	United States	212 (−4)			6,000
1995		Marilyn Lovander	United States	212 (−4)			6,000
1994		Marilyn Lovander	United States	213 (−3)			3,300
1993		Jodi Renner	United States	138 (−6)			2,600
1992		Cathy Mockett	United States	213 (−3)			2,600
1991		Kim Williams	United States	216 (E)			2,600
1990		Kelly Holland	United States	215 (−1)			4,000

== Tournament records ==
Year	Player	Score	Round	Course
2014	Kim Hye-min	62 (−9)	2nd	Capital Hills at Albany
2014	Sadena Parks	62 (−9)	3rd	Capital Hills at Albany
