= 2017 Evian Championship =

Coordinates: 46.394°N 6.570°E

Tournament information
- Dates: 14–17 September 2017
- Location: Évian-les-Bains, France
- Course(s): Evian Resort Golf Club
- Tour(s): Ladies European Tour; LPGA Tour

Statistics
- Par: 71
- Length: 6,482 yards (5,927 m)
- Field: 120 players, 72 after cut
- Cut: 145 (+3)
- Prize fund: $3,650,000 €3,068,956
- Winner's share: $547,500 €460,343

Champion
- (Sweden) Anna Nordqvist
- 204 (−9), playoff

Location in France

The 2017 Evian Championship was played 14–17 September at the Evian Resort Golf Club in Évian-les-Bains, France. It was the 24th Evian Championship (the first 19 played as the Evian Masters), and the fifth as a major championship on the LPGA Tour. The event was televised by Golf Channel and NBC Sports in the United States and Sky Sports in the United Kingdom.

Anna Nordqvist beat Brittany Altomare at the first hole of a sudden-death playoff, after the pair had tied on 204. The event was reduced to 54 holes after the first day's play was abandoned because of bad weather.

== Field ==
The field for the tournament is set at 120, and most earn exemptions based on past performance on the Ladies European Tour, the LPGA Tour, or with a high ranking in the Women's World Golf Rankings.

There are 15 exemption categories for the 2017 Evian Championship.

1. The top 40 in the Women's World Golf Rankings, as of 15 August 2017

Choi Hye-jin (a), Chun In-gee (2,4,8), Carlota Ciganda (5,7), Jodi Ewart Shadoff (7), Shanshan Feng (5,6,8), Brooke Henderson (4,5,8), Charley Hull (5), M. J. Hur, Ariya Jutanugarn (4,5,8), Moriya Jutanugarn, Danielle Kang (4,5), Cristie Kerr (5), Kim Hyo-joo (2), In-Kyung Kim (4,5,6,7,8), Kim Sei-young (5,8), Lydia Ko (2,4), Jessica Korda, Lee Mi-hyang (5,6), Minjee Lee, Mirim Lee, Haru Nomura (5,8), Anna Nordqvist (5), Park Sung-hyun (4,5,8), Suzann Pettersen (2), Gerina Piller (8), Ryu So-yeon (4,5,8), Lexi Thompson (4,5), Amy Yang (5)

- Michelle Wie (4) did not play following an appendectomy.
- Jang Ha-na (5), Kim Ha-neul, Kim Hae-rym (6), Ko Jin-young, Lee Bo-mee, Lee Jeong-eun, Stacy Lewis (4,5), Teresa Lu, Inbee Park (3,4,5), Jiyai Shin, and Ai Suzuki did not play

2. Past Evian Championship winners

all already qualified

3. Active Evian Masters Champions (must have played in 10 LPGA Tour or LET events from 5 September 2016 to 5 September 2017)

Paula Creamer, Laura Davies, Juli Inkster, Ai Miyazato, Karrie Webb

4. Winners of the other women's majors for the last five years

Brittany Lang, Brittany Lincicome (5), Mo Martin

5. LPGA Tour winners since the 2016 Evian

Katherine Kirk

6. LET winners since the 2016 Evian

Beth Allen, Aditi Ashok, Azahara Muñoz, Florentyna Parker, Melissa Reid, Supamas Sangchan, Klára Spilková, Atthaya Thitikul (a), Anne van Dam

7. The top five on the LET Order of Merit, as of 5 September

Georgia Hall, Caroline Masson

8. Top 10 and ties from the 2016 Evian Championship

Angela Stanford

9. 2017 U.S. Women's Amateur champion

Sophia Schubert (a)

10. 2017 British Ladies Amateur champion

- Leona Maguire (a) did not play

11. Top two players from the PHC Classic on the Symetra Tour

Brittany Marchand, Marion Ricordeau

12. Top player after the Evian Challenge in South Korea

Kim Do-yeon

13. Top two from the Jabra Ladies Open on the LET Access Series

Isabelle Boineau, Johanna Gustavsson

14. Evian invitations (four)

Natalie Gulbis, Agathe Laisné (a), Paphangkorn Tavatanakit (a), Albane Valenzuela (a)

15. LPGA Tour money list, as of 5 September (if needed to fill the field to 120)

Marina Alex, Brittany Altomare, Nicole Broch Larsen, Katie Burnett, Pei-Yun Chien, Chella Choi, Cydney Clanton, Jacqui Concolino, Perrine Delacour, Lindy Duncan, Austin Ernst, Simin Feng, Sandra Gal, Laura Gonzalez Escallon, Jaye Marie Green, Mina Harigae, Caroline Hedwall, Wei-Ling Hsu, Karine Icher, Ji Eun-hee, Tiffany Joh, Kim Kaufman, Megan Khang, Christina Kim, Joanna Klatten, Nelly Korda, Olafia Kristinsdottir, Candie Kung, Bronte Law, Alison Lee, Amelia Lewis, Lee Jeong-eun, Pernilla Lindberg, Gaby López, Catriona Matthew, Ally McDonald, Wichanee Meechai, Su-Hyun Oh, Amy Olson, Ryann O'Toole, Lee-Anne Pace, Jane Park, Emily Kristine Pedersen, Pornanong Phatlum, Morgan Pressel, Beatriz Recari, Madelene Sagström, Sherman Santiwiwatthanaphong, Jenny Shin, Kelly Shon, Sarah Jane Smith, Jennifer Song, Mariah Stackhouse, Marissa Steen, Thidapa Suwannapura, Yani Tseng, Ayako Uehara, Mariajo Uribe, Jing Yan, Angel Yin, Yoo Sun-young

- Ashleigh Buhai, Sandra Changkija, Lizette Salas, and Alena Sharp did not play

== Course ==
Hole	1	2	3	4	5	6	7	8	9	Out	10	11	12	13	14	15	16	17	18	In	Total
Par	4	3	4	4	3	4	5	3	5	35	4	4	4	5	3	5	3	4	4	36	71
Yards	399	165	355	414	188	384	545	189	505	3,144	417	353	406	499	209	527	155	331	441	3,338	6,482
Metres	365	151	325	379	172	351	498	173	461	2,874	381	323	372	456	191	482	142	303	403	3,052	5,926

== Round summaries ==
=== First round ===
Thursday, 14 September 2017

Strong winds and heavy rain caused play to be abandoned. The scores of the players who had already started were not counted and the tournament will resume on Friday as a 54-hole event with a cut after 36 holes.

Friday, 15 September 2017

Place	Player	Score	To par
1	(South Korea) Park Sung-hyun	63	−8
2	(Thailand) Moriya Jutanugarn	65	−6
T3	(Australia) Katherine Kirk	66	−5
T3	(Sweden) Anna Nordqvist	66	−5
T5	(United States) Marina Alex	67	−4
T5	(South Korea) In-Kyung Kim	67	−4
T5	(United States) Jessica Korda	67	−4
T8	(United States) Austin Ernst	68	−3
T8	(England) Georgia Hall	68	−3
T8	(South Korea) M. J. Hur	68	−3
T8	(New Zealand) Lydia Ko	68	−3
T8	(Japan) Ai Miyazato	68	−3
T8	(United States) Ryann O'Toole	68	−3
T8	(United States) Sophia Schubert (a)	68	−3
T8	(Japan) Ayako Uehara	68	−3

=== Second round ===
Saturday, 16 September 2017

Place	Player	Score	To par
1	(Thailand) Moriya Jutanugarn	65-68=133	−9
2	(Japan) Ayako Uehara	68-66=134	−8
3	(Australia) Katherine Kirk	66-69=135	−7
T4	(South Korea) In-Kyung Kim	67-69=136	−6
T4	(New Zealand) Lydia Ko	68-68=136	−6
T4	(South Korea) Park Sung-hyun	63-73=136	−6
T7	(China) Shanshan Feng	69-68=137	−5
T7	(England) Georgia Hall	68-69=137	−5
T7	(United States) Jennifer Song	72-65=137	−5
T7	(United States) Angela Stanford	69-68=137	−5

=== Final round ===
Sunday, 17 September 2017

Place	Player	Score	To par	Money (US$)
T1	(United States) Brittany Altomare	70-68-66=204	−9	Playoff
T1	(Sweden) Anna Nordqvist	66-72-66=204	−9	Playoff
T3	(Thailand) Moriya Jutanugarn	65-68-72=205	−8	196,789
T3	(Australia) Katherine Kirk	66-69-70=205	−8	196,789
T3	(New Zealand) Lydia Ko	68-68-69=205	−8	196,789
T6	(China) Shanshan Feng	69-68-69=206	−7	115,285
T6	(South Korea) Kim Sei-young	70-68-68=206	−7	115,285
8	(United States) Jennifer Song	72-65-70=207	−6	92,042
9	(South Korea) Lee Mi-hyang	69-72-67=208	−5	82,746
T10	(England) Georgia Hall	68-69-72=209	−4	70,037
T10	(South Korea) In-Kyung Kim	67-69-73=209	−4	70,037
T10	(Japan) Ayako Uehara	68-66-75=209	−4	70,037

==== Scorecard ====
Final round

Hole	1	2	3	4	5	6	7	8	9	10	11	12	13	14	15	16	17	18
Par	4	3	4	4	3	4	5	3	5	4	4	4	5	3	5	3	4	4
(Sweden) Nordqvist	−3	−3	−3	−3	−2	−3	−5	−5	−5	−5	−5	−6	−6	−7	−9	−10	−10	−9
(United States) Altomare	−4	−3	−3	−4	−5	−5	−5	−6	−7	−7	−7	−8	−8	−8	−8	−8	−9	−9
(Thailand) Jutanugarn	−8	−8	−9	−10	−9	−9	−9	−9	−10	−10	−10	−10	−9	−9	−9	−9	−9	−8
(Australia) Kirk	−8	−8	−8	−8	−8	−7	−8	−8	−8	−7	−7	−7	−7	−8	−9	−8	−7	−8
(New Zealand) Ko	−6	−6	−7	−8	−8	−8	−7	−7	−7	−7	−7	−7	−6	−7	−9	−9	−9	−8
(China) Feng	−5	−5	−5	−6	−7	−6	−6	−5	−5	−5	−5	−6	−7	−7	−7	−8	−8	−7
(South Korea) Kim	−4	−4	−4	−4	−5	−5	−5	−5	−5	−3	−3	−4	−5	−6	−5	−6	−6	−7
(Japan) Uehara	−8	−8	−8	−7	−7	−7	−7	−7	−7	−7	−8	−8	−7	−5	−5	−5	−5	−4

Cumulative tournament scores, relative to par

Eagles	Birdie	Bogey	Double bogey

==== Playoff ====
The sudden-death playoff was on the par-4 18th hole. Altomare took a double-bogey 6 to Nordqvist's bogey 5.

Place	Player	Score	To par	Money ($)
1	(Sweden) Anna Nordqvist	5	+1	547,500
2	(United States) Brittany Altomare	6	+2	339,625
