= Annie Park =

American professional golfer (born 1995)

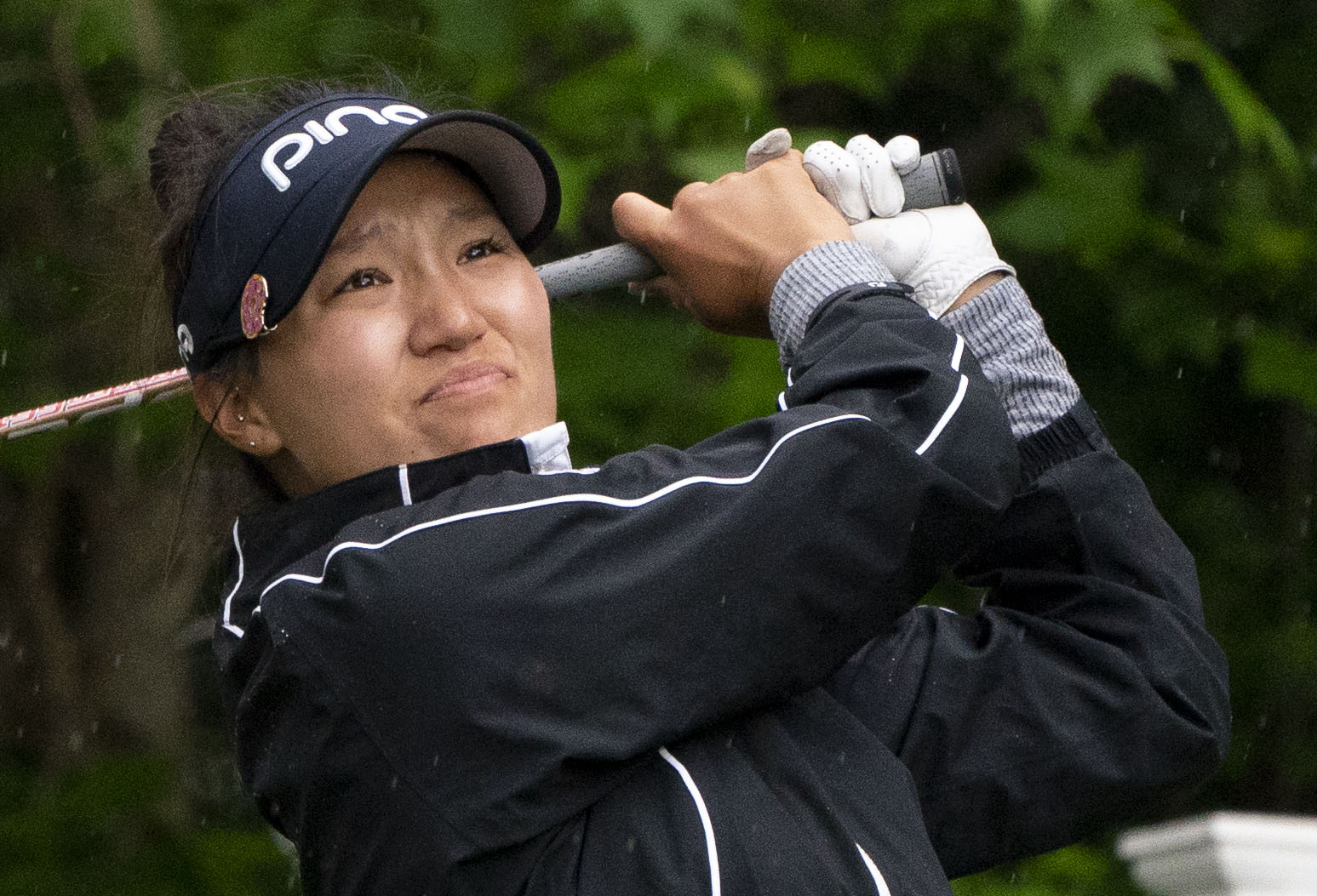
- Park at 2018 Kingsmill Championship

Personal information
- Nationality: United States
- Born: April 9, 1995 (age 31) Levittown, New York, U.S.
- Height: 5 ft 9 in (1.75 m)

Career
- Sport: Golf
- College: University of Southern California
- Turned professional: 2015
- Current tour: LPGA Tour (joined 2016)
- Former tour: Symetra Tour (joined 2015)
- Professional wins: 4

Number of wins by tour
- LPGA Tour: 1
- Epson Tour: 3

Best results in LPGA major championships
- Chevron Championship: T25: 2022
- Women's PGA C'ship: T18: 2018
- U.S. Women's Open: 67th: 2022
- Women's British Open: T57: 2018, 2019
- Evian Championship: T22: 2016

Achievements and awards
- Symetra Tour Player of the Year: 2015
- Symetra Tour Rookie of the Year: 2015
- Honda Sports Award: 2013

- Annie Park
- Hangul: 박보선
- RR: Bak Boseon
- MR: Pak Posŏn

Annie Park (born April 9, 1995) is an American professional golfer who plays on the LPGA Tour. Park has one win on that tour, at the 2018 ShopRite LPGA Classic, and competed in the 2019 Solheim Cup. Previously, she was the 2013 NCAA individual champion and had three victories on the Symetra Tour.

== Early life ==
In 1995, Park was born in Levittown, New York. She began playing golf at the age of 7, and later in her youth she worked with instructor Sean Foley.

At the age of 17, Park was the champion of the 2012 Nassau County High School Championship; as one of two women in the 135-player field, she broke the event's scoring record. That year, she played in the U.S. Women's Open.

== Amateur career ==
In 2013, Park began playing college golf for the University of Southern California, and won the Pac-12 championship and three other events. At the NCAA Division I Women's Golf Championships, she won the individual title by six strokes and helped USC win the team national championship. In 2013, Park was named the winner of the Honda Sports Award as the best female college golfer in the U.S.

Park also played on the winning U.S. team in the 2014 Curtis Cup.

== Professional career ==
=== Symetra Tour ===
In 2015, following her junior year at USC, she turned professional and joined the Symetra Tour, winning three times in 11 events. Following titles in the Toyota Danielle Downey Classic and the PHC Classic, her third victory came at the Prairie Band Casino & Resort Charity Classic; she became the 10th Symetra Tour player with a three-win season. At the end of the season, Park was the leading money winner on the tour and earned Player of the Year and Rookie of the Year honors, along with full playing privileges on the LPGA Tour for 2016.

=== LPGA Tour ===
She played in 25 events during the 2016 LPGA Tour season and had a pair of top-10 finishes. At the ShopRite LPGA Classic, Park tied for sixth, her best result of the year. In addition, she graduated from USC with a communications degree. Towards the end of 2016, though, she had begun to suffer from a back injury.

In 2017, Park's performance declined as she dealt with the injury. She missed the cut in 10 of the 17 tournaments in which she played. After ending 2017 outside the top 120 in season earnings, Park lost full status on the LPGA Tour for 2018, limiting her playing opportunities. At the LPGA Mediheal Championship in April 2018, she gained a spot in the field in a Monday qualifier and finished in a tie for 18th after being within one stroke of the lead following the second round. The result led to an improvement in her playing status for tournament entry, but she did not place better than joint 40th in her next three appearances.

Entering the ShopRite LPGA Classic, Park was number 236 in the Women's World Golf Rankings. At that event, she posted rounds of 69, 65, and 63, for a 16-under-par total that gave her a one-stroke win over Sakura Yokomine, the first of her career on the LPGA Tour. Her winner's check of $262,500 was more than her career earnings at the time. Later in the year, at the Buick LPGA Shanghai, Park finished in a tie for second, one stroke behind winner Danielle Kang. For the season, she made 16 cuts in 19 events and had three top-10 results. Her earnings of nearly $550,000 placed her in 40th on the LPGA's 2018 money list.

In 2019, Park qualified for the U.S. Solheim Cup team based on her position in the Women's World Golf Rankings. She went 1–2–0 in her three matches as the European team defeated the U.S. Park made the cut in 19 of her 25 events during the 2019 season, and finished in the top 10 three times. At the Hugel-Air Premia LA Open in April, she tied for third place, five strokes behind winner Minjee Lee. She earned more than $400,000 in 2019, and ended the year in 50th on the LPGA money list.

During the 2020 LPGA Tour season, which was shortened by the COVID-19 pandemic, Park was 79th on the money list with over $118,000 in earnings. She had one top-10 finish, a sixth-place result in her first event of the year, the Diamond Resorts Tournament of Champions. In 2021, Park made over $123,000, dropping to 103rd in season earnings. She made the cut in 12 of 18 events played but had no top-10 finishes; her top placing was a tie for 12th at the Kia Classic. Park played in 24 tournaments during the 2022 season, making the cut in half of them and posting two top-10s, including a tie for fifth at the Palos Verdes Championship. Her earnings of over $200,000 placed her inside the top 100 on the money list. The following season, Park fell outside the top 100 in earnings, as her top finish in 21 events was a tie for 12th.

== Awards and honors ==
- In 2013, Park earned Honda Sports Award in the golf category, bestowed to the top female college golfer in the United States.
- In 2015, she earned Rookie of the Year and Player of the Year honors on the Symetra Tour.

== Amateur wins ==
- 2011 Lessing's AJGA Classic
- 2013 Bruin Wave Invitational, Pac-12 Championship, NCAA Division I West Regional (tie with Paula Reto), NCAA Division I Championships
- 2014 NorthropGrumman Regional Challenge, Windy City Collegiate Championship

== Professional wins (4) ==
=== LPGA Tour wins (1) ===
No.	Date	Tournament	Winning score	To par	Margin of victory	Runner-up	Winner's share ($)
1	Jun 10, 2018	ShopRite LPGA Classic	69-65-63=197	−16	1 stroke	(Japan) Sakura Yokomine	262,500

=== Symetra Tour wins (3) ===
- 2015 Toyota Danielle Downey Classic, PHC Classic, Prairie Band Casino & Resort Charity Classic

== Results in LPGA majors ==
Results not in chronological order.

Tournament	2012	2013	2014	2015	2016	2017	2018	2019	2020	2021	2022	2023
Chevron Championship			CUT		T56			CUT	T57	CUT	T25	CUT
Women's PGA Championship					CUT	CUT	T18	T30	CUT	66	CUT	74
U.S. Women's Open	CUT	CUT						CUT	CUT		67	CUT
The Evian Championship ^					T22		CUT	T30	NT		CUT	
Women's British Open					CUT		T57	T57	CUT		CUT	

^ The Evian Championship was added as a major in 2013

Did not play

CUT = missed the half-way cut
NT = No tournament
"T" = tied

=== Summary ===
Tournament	Wins	2nd	3rd	Top-5	Top-10	Top-25	Events	Cuts made
Chevron Championship	0	0	0	0	0	1	7	3
Women's PGA Championship	0	0	0	0	0	1	8	4
U.S. Women's Open	0	0	0	0	0	0	6	1
The Evian Championship	0	0	0	0	0	1	4	2
Women's British Open	0	0	0	0	0	0	5	2
Totals	0	0	0	0	0	3	30	12

== LPGA Tour career summary ==
Season	Tournaments played	Cuts made	Wins	2nds	3rds	Top 10s	Best finish	Earnings ($)	Money list rank	Scoring average	Scoring rank
2012	1	0	0	0	0	0	CUT	n/a		82.50	
2013	1	0	0	0	0	0	CUT	n/a		77.00	
2014	1	0	0	0	0	0	CUT	n/a		77.00	
2016	25	15	0	0	0	2	T6	172,337	82	72.56	94
2017	17	7	0	0	0	0	T26	59,914	127	72.06	95
2018	19	16	1	1	0	3	1	549,421	40	71.33	42
2019	25	19	0	0	1	3	T3	407,836	50	71.46	63
2020	14	9	0	0	0	1	6	118,543	79	72.24	78
2021	18	12	0	0	0	0	T12	123,423	103	71.64	80
2022	24	12	0	0	0	2	T5	204,363	94	72.13	113
2023	21	7	0	0	0	0	T12	94,355	129	72.85	140
2024	10	5	0	0	0	0	T23	53,769	160	72.08	n/a
2025	5	0	0	0	0	0	CUT	0	n/a	76.17	n/a

Official through the 2025 season

== U.S. national team appearances ==
Amateur

- Curtis Cup: 2014 (winners)

Professional

- Solheim Cup: 2019

=== Solheim Cup record ===
Year	Total matches	Total W–L–H	Singles W–L–H	Foursomes W–L–H	Fourballs W–L–H	Points won	Points %
Career	3	1–2–0	0–1–0	0–1–0	1–0–0	1	33.3
2019	3	1–2–0	0–1–0 lost to C. Boutier 2&1	0–1–0 lost w/ M. Khang 2&1	1–0–0 won w/ B. Altomare 1 up	1	33.3
