= Indy Women in Tech Championship =

Golf tournament formerly on the LPGA Tour

Coordinates: 39.789°N 86.229°W

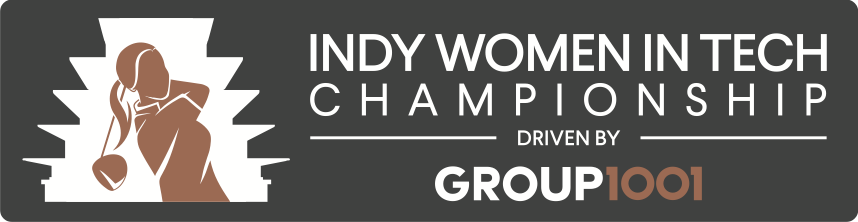

Tournament information
- Location: Speedway, Indiana, U.S.
- Established: 2017
- Course: Brickyard Crossing
- Par: 72
- Length: 6,456 yards (5,903 m)
- Tour: LPGA Tour
- Format: Stroke play – 72 holes (2018)
- Prize fund: $2.0 million
- Month played: September (2019)

Tournament record score
- Aggregate: 265 Park Sung-hyun (2018); 265 Lizette Salas (2018)
- To par: −23 as above

Current champion
- (South Korea) M. J. Hur

Location in the United States
Location in Indiana

The Indy Women in Tech Championship was a women's professional golf tournament on the LPGA Tour, played in Indianapolis, Indiana.

On September 27, 2016, the Indianapolis Motor Speedway announced that the LPGA would return to Indiana with a tournament at the Pete Dye-designed Brickyard Crossing Golf Resort at the speedway. Guggenheim Life and Annuity was named the sponsor of the Indy Women in Tech Championship, with the schedule from September 7–10, 2017. The Speedway had previously hosted PGA Tour and LPGA events on the former Speedway Golf Course (which was replaced with the Brickyard Crossing) in the 1960s, and a Champions Tour event in the 1990s on the Dye course.

Although planned as a 72-hole event with a cut, it was shortened to 54 holes and ended on Saturday in 2017 since its date was the week before the Evian Championship, and players would be able to be in France in order to prepare for the major. For 2018, the Big Machine 400 was moved to the September date that was used by the IWIT Championship in 2017. Speedway officials were able to have the tournament moved to August, and hosted the event as a 144-player, 72-hole full-field event for 2018.

For spectator reasons, the course was re-routed for tournament play. The front nine consisted of holes 11–18, then hole one. The back nine was holes 2–10. This allowed the four holes inside the track infield (ordinarily holes 7–10) to be played as the four finishing holes.

== Winners ==
Year	Dates	Champion	Country	Winning score	To par	Margin of victory	Purse ($)	Winner's share ($)
2019	Sep 26–29	M. J. Hur	South Korea	63-70-66-68=267	−21	4 strokes	2,000,000	300,000
2018	Aug 16–19	Park Sung-hyun	South Korea	68-63-66-68=265	−23	Playoff	2,000,000	300,000
2017	Sep 7–9	Lexi Thompson	United States	63-66-68=197	−19	4 strokes	2,000,000	300,000

- The event was 54 holes in 2017 because of its proximity to the Evian Championship.

== Tournament records ==
Year	Player	Score	To par	Round
2018	Lizette Salas	62	−10	1st

== See also ==
- 500 Ladies Classic – an LPGA Tour event held in June 1968 at the same location.
- 500 Festival Open Invitation – a PGA Tour event held at the same location from 1960 to 1968
- Brickyard Crossing Championship – the Senior PGA Tour event was played from 1994 through 2000
