= Austin Ernst =

American professional golfer (born 1992)

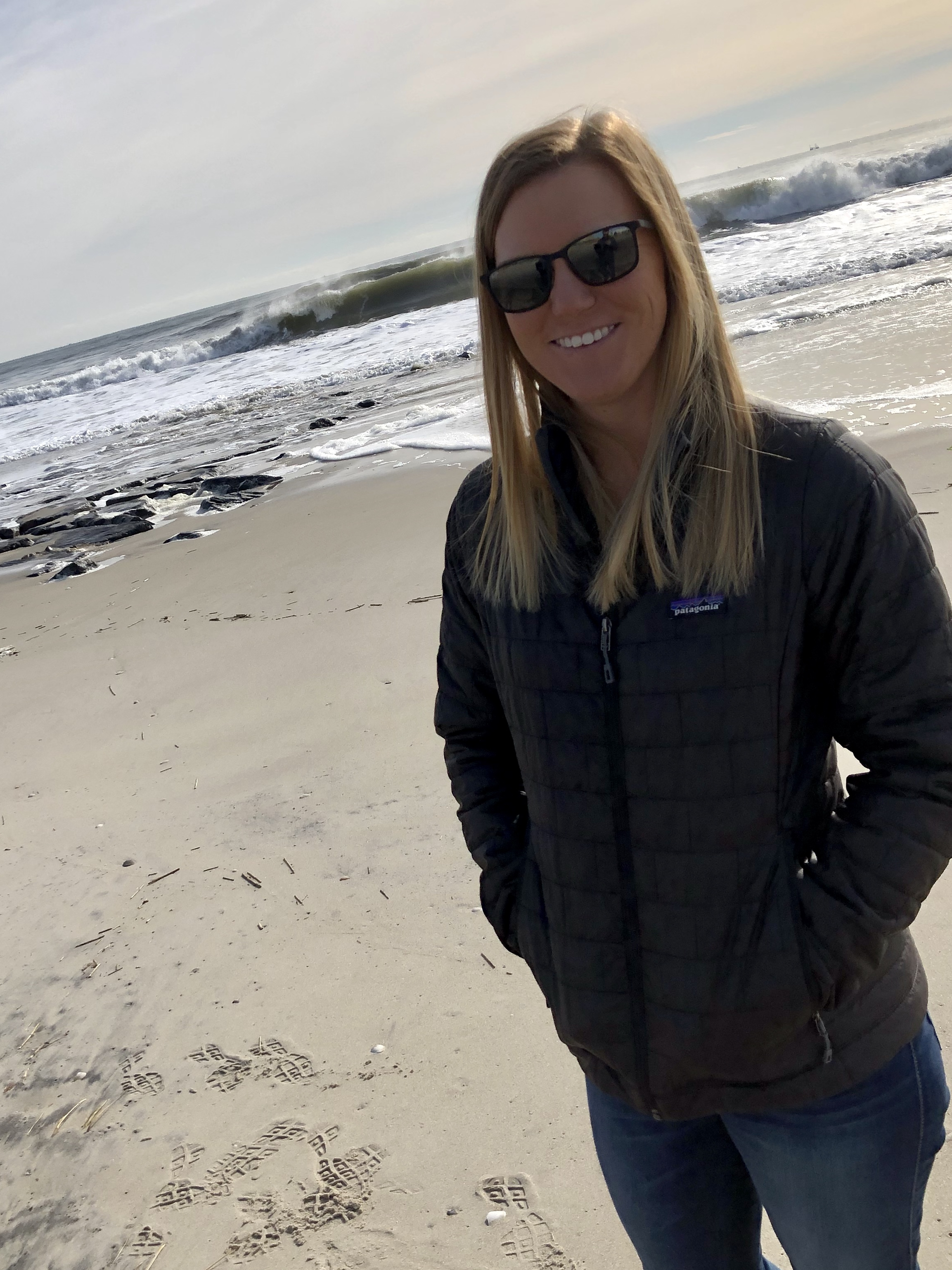
- Ernst in 2019

Personal information
- Nationality: United States
- Born: January 31, 1992 (age 34) Greenville, South Carolina, U.S.
- Height: 5 ft 5 in (1.65 m)

Career
- Sport: Golf
- College: Louisiana State University
- Turned professional: 2012
- Current tour: LPGA Tour
- Professional wins: 3

Number of wins by tour
- LPGA Tour: 3

Best results in LPGA major championships
- Chevron Championship: T14: 2017
- Women's PGA C'ship: T7: 2021
- U.S. Women's Open: T41: 2018
- Women's British Open: 5th: 2020
- Evian Championship: T2: 2018

Austin Ernst (born January 31, 1992) is an American professional golfer. She played on the LPGA Tour and is currently a golf coach.

== Early life and amateur career ==
In 1992, Ernst was born in Greenville, South Carolina. She played two years for the LSU Tigers where she won three events including the individual 2011 NCAA Division I Championship.

== Professional career ==
In 2014, Ernst won the Portland Classic on the first playoff hole over In-Kyung Kim.

In August 2020, Ernst won the Walmart NW Arkansas Championship, for her second LPGA Tour title. In the final round, she shot 8-under 63 for a two-stroke victory over Anna Nordqvist.

In June 2023, Ernst announced her "semi-retirement" from tournament play due to a lingering neck injury. Her last LPGA Tour event was the 2023 Women's PGA Championship, where she had to withdraw after the first round. She also accepted an assistant coaching position at Texas A&M University.

== Amateur wins ==
- 2011 NCAA Division I Championship
- 2012 North and South Women's Amateur

== Professional wins (3) ==
=== LPGA Tour wins (3) ===
No.	Date	Tournament	Winning score	To par	Margin of victory	Runner-up
1	Aug 31, 2014	Portland Classic	69-69-69-67=274	−14	Playoff	(South Korea) In-Kyung Kim
2	Aug 30, 2020	Walmart NW Arkansas Championship	65-65-63=193	−20	2 strokes	(Sweden) Anna Nordqvist
3	Mar 7, 2021	LPGA Drive On Championship	67-67-69-70=273	−15	5 strokes	(United States) Jennifer Kupcho

LPGA Tour playoff record (1–0)

No.	Year	Tournament	Opponent(s)	Result
1	2014	Portland Classic	(South Korea) In-Kyung Kim	Won with par on first extra hole

== Results in LPGA majors ==
Results not in chronological order before 2019.

Tournament	2012	2013	2014	2015	2016	2017	2018	2019
Chevron Championship	T49	CUT	T51	T20	T32	T14	T25	T71
U.S. Women's Open		T48		T47	CUT	T44	T41	T50
Women's PGA Championship		CUT	71	CUT	T64	T29	CUT	CUT
The Evian Championship		CUT	CUT	T70	T67	T48	T2	T25
Women's British Open		CUT	T62	T56	CUT	CUT	CUT	T61

Tournament	2020	2021	2022	2023	2024	2025	2026
Chevron Championship	T40	T40	T53				CUT
U.S. Women's Open	CUT	T57					
Women's PGA Championship	T58	T7		WD			
The Evian Championship	NT	T35					
Women's British Open	5	CUT					

Top 10
Did not play

CUT = missed the half-way cut
WD = withdrew
NT = no tournament
T = tied

=== Summary ===
Tournament	Wins	2nd	3rd	Top-5	Top-10	Top-25	Events	Cuts made
Chevron Championship	0	0	0	0	0	3	12	10
U.S. Women's Open	0	0	0	0	0	0	8	6
Women's PGA Championship	0	0	0	0	1	1	10	5
The Evian Championship	0	1	0	1	1	2	8	6
Women's British Open	0	0	0	1	1	1	9	4
Totals	0	1	0	2	3	7	47	31

- Most consecutive cuts made – 5 (2020 Evian – 2021 PGA)
- Longest streak of top-10s – 1 (three times)

== U.S. national team appearances ==
Amateur

- Spirit International Amateur: 2011 (winners)
- Curtis Cup: 2012
- Espirito Santo Trophy: 2012

Professional

- Solheim Cup: 2017 (winners), 2021

=== Solheim Cup record ===
Year	Total matches	Total W–L–H	Singles W–L–H	Foursomes W–L–H	Fourballs W–L–H	Points won	Points %
Career	8	3–4–1	0–1–1	2–2–0	1–1–0	3.5	43.8
2017	4	2–2–0	0–1–0 lost to M. Sagström 3&2	1–1–0 lost w/ P. Creamer 3&1 won w/ P. Creamer 5&3	1–0–0 won w/ P. Creamer 2&1	2.0	50.0
2021	4	1–2–1	0–0–1 halved w/ Nanna Koertz Madsen	1–1–0 lost w/ D. Kang 1 down won w/ D. Kang 1 up	0–1–0 lost w/ D. Kang 3&2	1.5	37.5
