= 500 Ladies Classic =

Golf tournament formerly on the LPGA Tour

Coordinates: 39.789°N 86.229°W

Tournament information
- Location: Speedway, Indiana, U.S.
- Established: 1968
- Course: Speedway Golf Course
- Par: 72
- Tour: LPGA Tour
- Format: Stroke play – 54 holes
- Prize fund: $15,000
- Month played: June
- Final year: 1968

Tournament record score
- Aggregate: Mickey Wright
- To par: −4 as above

Final champion
- (United States) Mickey Wright

Location in the United States
Location in Indiana

The 500 Ladies Classic was a women's professional golf tournament on the LPGA Tour, played only in 1968. It was held at the Speedway Golf Course at the Indianapolis Motor Speedway in Indianapolis, Indiana. Mickey Wright won the event at 212 (−4), three strokes ahead of runner-up Kathy Whitworth; it was her 80th tour win.

== Winner ==
| Year | Date | Champion | Country | Winning score | To par | Margin of victory | Runner-up | Purse ($) | Winner's share ($) |
|---|---|---|---|---|---|---|---|---|---|
| 1968 | Jun 14–16 | Mickey Wright | United States | 70-74-68=212 | −4 | 3 strokes | (United States) Kathy Whitworth | 15,000 | 2,250 |

== See also ==
- Indy Women in Tech Championship – an LPGA Tour event held at Brickyard Crossing, debuted in 2017
- 500 Festival Open Invitation – a PGA Tour event held at Speedway Golf Course from 1960 to 1968
- Brickyard Crossing Championship – the senior tour event was played from 1994 through 2000
