= Christine Song =

American golfer (born 1991)

Personal information
- Nationality: United States
- Born: 14 June 1991 (age 35) Burbank, California, U.S.
- Height: 5 ft 3 in (1.60 m)

Career
- Sport: Golf
- Turned professional: 2009
- Current tours: LPGA Tour (joined 2010); Symetra Tour (joined 2009)
- Professional wins: 5

Number of wins by tour
- Epson Tour: 5

Best results in LPGA major championships
- Chevron Championship: DNP
- Women's PGA C'ship: CUT: 2011, 2012, 2016
- U.S. Women's Open: T67: 2016
- Women's British Open: CUT: 2012
- Evian Championship: DNP

Christine Song (born June 14, 1991) is an American female professional golfer currently playing on the LPGA Tour and formerly on the Futures Tour.

== Early life ==
Song was born in Burbank, California on June 14, 1991.

== Professional career ==
In 2009, Song turned professional. She joined the Futures Tour on January 21, 2009. She played in the 2011 LPGA Championship but missed the cut.

== Personal life ==
Song lives in Florida.

== Professional wins (5) ==
=== Symetra Tour wins (5) ===
No.	Date	Tournament	Winning score	Margin of victory	Runner(s)-up
1	Jun 6, 2010	Ladies Titan Tire Challenge	−11 (69-69-67=205)	6 strokes	(United States) Hannah Jun, (United States) Mo Martin, (United States) Whitney Wade
2	Jun 13, 2010	Teva Championship	−15 (66-64-68=198)	4 strokes	(United States) Gerina Mendoza
3	Apr 28, 2013	Guardian Retirement Championship	−5 (68-72-71=211)	Playoff	(France) Isabelle Boineau
4	Aug 18, 2013	Eagle Classic	−8 (67-70-71=208)	3 strokes	(France) Perrine Delacour, (United States) Kendall Dye, (United States) Stefanie Kenoyer, (Malaysia) Chua Tze Jean
5	Sep 18, 2016	Garden City Charity Classic Presented by Mariah Fund	−13 (68-66-69=203)	2 strokes	(Thailand) Wichanee Meechai
