= Sara Bay Classic =

Golf tournament in Florida

Tournament information
- Location: Sarasota, Florida
- Established: 2012
- Course(s): Sara Bay Country Club
- Par: 72
- Tour(s): Symetra Tour
- Format: Stroke play
- Prize fund: $110,000
- Month played: April
- Final year: 2017

Final champion
- (Australia) Hannah Green

The Sara Bay Classic was a tournament on the Symetra Tour, the LPGA's developmental tour. It was part of the Symetra Tour's schedule between 2012 and 2017. It was held at Sara Bay Country Club in Sarasota, Florida.

== Winners ==
Year	Date	Winner	Country	Score	Margin of victory	Runner(s)-up	Purse ($)	Winner's share ($)	Ref
Sara Bay Classic
2017	Apr 21–23	Hannah Green	Australia	214 (−2)	2 strokes	(Thailand) Benyapa Niphatsophon (Philippines) Princess Superal	110,000	16,500	
Guardian Retirement Championship at Sara Bay
2016	Apr 22–24	Brittany Altomare	United States	216 (E)	Playoff	(Denmark) Nicole Broch Larsen	110,000	16,500	
2015	Apr 24–26	Rachel Rohanna	United States	211 (−5)	2 strokes	(United States) Lindy Duncan (Canada) Maude-Aimee Leblanc (United States) Lee Lopez (Italy) Giulia Molinaro (United States) Jean Reynolds	110,000	16,500	
2014	Apr 25–27	Marissa Steen	United States	213 (−3)	Playoff	(China) Yueer Cindy Feng	100,000	15,000	
2013	Apr 26–28	Christine Song	United States	211 (−5)	Playoff	(France) Isabelle Boineau	100,000	15,000	
Sara Bay Classic
2012	Apr 20–22	Esther Choe	United States	217 (+1)	4 strokes	(United States) Hannah Jun (South Korea) Lee Mi-hyang	100,000	15,000	
