= Brittany Altomare =

American professional golfer

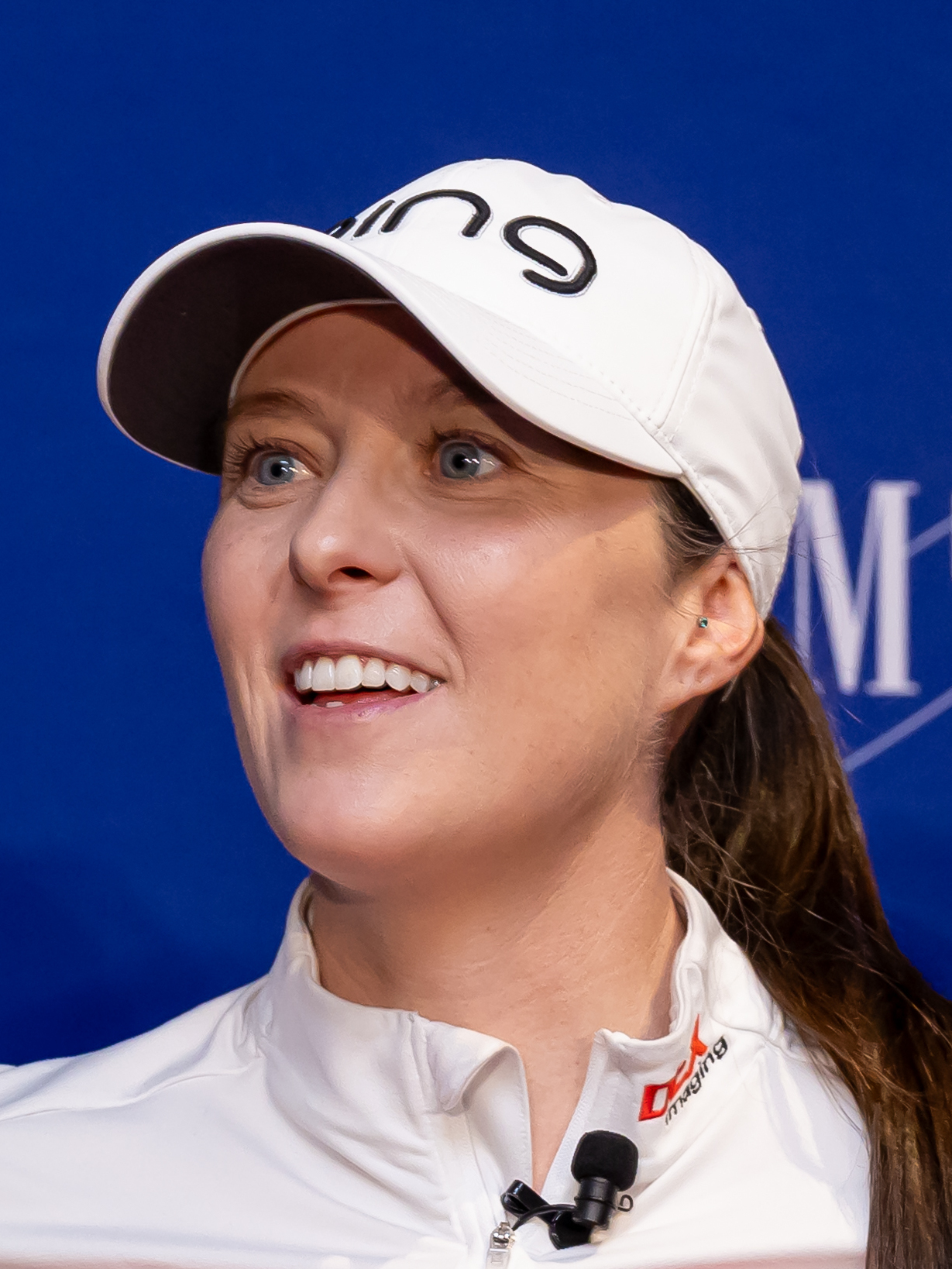
- Altomare in 2023

Personal information
- Nationality: United States
- Born: November 19, 1990 (age 35) Worcester, Massachusetts, U.S.
- Height: 5 ft 6 in (1.68 m)

Career
- Sport: Golf
- College: University of Virginia
- Turned professional: 2013
- Former tours: LPGA Tour; Symetra Tour
- Professional wins: 1

Best results in LPGA major championships
- Chevron Championship: T16: 2018
- Women's PGA C'ship: T25: 2017
- U.S. Women's Open: T41: 2018
- Women's British Open: T15: 2018
- Evian Championship: 2nd: 2017

Brittany Altomare (born November 19, 1990) is an American professional golfer who played on the LPGA Tour. She finished runner-up in the 2017 Evian Championship, losing to Anna Nordqvist in a playoff. She had finished tied for third in the Cambia Portland Classic two weeks earlier.

She won the Guardian Retirement Championship on the 2016 Symetra Tour, beating Nicole Broch Larsen at the fifth hole of a sudden-death playoff after the pair had finished level at 216 after 54 holes.

She attended Shrewsbury High School.

== Professional wins (1) ==
=== Symetra Tour (1) ===
- 2016 Guardian Retirement Championship

== Playoff record ==
LPGA Tour playoff record (0–1)

No.	Year	Tournament	Opponent	Result
1	2017	The Evian Championship	(Sweden) Anna Nordqvist	Lost to bogey on first extra hole

== Results in LPGA majors ==
Results not in chronological order.

Tournament	2009	2010	2011	2012	2013	2014	2015	2016	2017	2018	2019	2020	2021	2022	2023
Chevron Championship										T16	T44	T30	CUT	T39	T63
U.S. Women's Open	CUT	CUT		CUT						T41	T55	CUT	T46	T44	
Women's PGA Championship								CUT	T25	T33	T26	CUT	CUT	T60	CUT
The Evian Championship ^								CUT	2	T44	T22	NT	T15	T22	
Women's British Open								T58	T49	T15	T29	T19	T42	T54	

^ The Evian Championship was added as a major in 2013.

Top 10
Did not play

CUT = missed the half-way cut
NT = no tournament
"T" = tied

== Team appearances ==
Amateur

- Junior Ryder Cup (representing the United States): 2006

Professional

- Solheim Cup (representing the United States): 2019, 2021

=== Solheim Cup record ===
Year	Total matches	Total W–L–H	Singles W–L–H	Foursomes W–L–H	Fourballs W–L–H	Points won	Points %
Career	8	4–3–1	2–0–0	1–2–0	1–1–1	4.5	56.3
2019	4	2–1–1	1–0–0 def. J. Shadoff 5&4	0–1–0 lost w/ L. Thompson 2&1	1–0–1 halved w/ N. Korda won w/ A. Park 1 up	2.5	62.5
2021	4	2–2–0	1–0–0 def. C. Ciganda 2&1	1–1–0 lost w/ L. Thompson 1 up won w/ L. Thompson 2&1	0–1–0 lost w/ Y. Noh 1 up	2.0	50.0
