= 2019 Solheim Cup =

Women's team golf competition

- Dates: 13–15 September 2019
- Venue: Gleneagles Hotel in Perthshire
- Location: Scotland
- Captains: Catriona Matthew (Europe); Juli Inkster (USA)
(Europe)	14 1/2	13 1/2	(United States)
- Europe wins the Solheim Cup

Location map
- Location within Europe Location within Scotland

The 2019 Solheim Cup was the 16th edition of the Solheim Cup matches, held from 13 to 15 September at the Gleneagles PGA Centenary Course in Scotland. The Solheim Cup is a biennial team competition between the top women professional golfers from Europe and the United States. It is a three-day match play event between teams of twelve players with a similar format to the Ryder Cup. Juli Inkster captained the U.S. team for the third time and Catriona Matthew captained the European team for the first time.

After the first two days the competition was tied at 8-all. Europe won the singles 6 1/2–5 1/2 to win the Cup for the first time since 2013.

== Format ==
The Solheim Cup is a match play event, with each match worth one point. The format is as follows:

- Day 1 (Friday): Four foursome (alternate shot) matches in a morning session and four fourball (better ball) matches in an afternoon session. A total of eight players from each team participate in each session.
- Day 2 (Saturday): Four foursome (alternate shot) matches in a morning session and four fourball (better ball) matches in an afternoon session. A total of eight players from each team participate in each session.
- Day 3 (Sunday): 12 singles matches. All 12 players from each team participate.

With a total of 28 points, 14 1/2 points are required to win the Cup, and 14 points are required for the defending champion to retain the Cup. All matches are played to a maximum of 18 holes. If the score is even after 18 holes, each team earns one-half point.

== Team qualification and selection ==
=== Eligibility criteria ===
The European and United States teams had different eligibility criteria:

Team Europe
Members of the European team must:

1. be current members of the Ladies European Tour in any category or membership;
2. have played in eight Ranking Events, excluding major championships not played in Europe, during the Qualifying Period as a member of the LET, unless selected as a Captain's pick (provided she is otherwise eligible);
3. must be a "European national". To be a "European national", the player must satisfy the criteria set out in the "Nationality Policy" issued by the International Golf Federation.

Team USA
Members of the United States team must be current members of the LPGA Tour and meet one of these three citizenship criteria:

- U.S. citizens by birth, regardless of their birthplace.
- Those who were naturalized as U.S. citizens before age 18.
- Those who became U.S. citizens by adoption before age 13.

=== Team selection ===
The European and United States teams were selected by different methods.

Team Europe
Team Europe consisted of the top three players from the LET Solheim Cup standings, followed by the top five LET members on the Women's World Golf Rankings who were not already qualified via the Solheim Cup standings, and four captain's selections. The 2019 Aberdeen Standard Investments Ladies Scottish Open, held at The Renaissance Club in North Berwick, Scotland, ending on 11 August, was the final event of the qualification period, and the full team, including the captain's picks, was announced on 12 August.

Team USA
Team USA consisted of the leading eight players from the LPGA Solheim Cup points rankings, the top two players in the Women's World Golf Rankings not already qualified via the points rankings and two chosen by the team captain. LPGA Solheim Cup points were earned for top-20 finishes on the LPGA Tour over a two-year period ending on August 25 with the 2019 Canadian Women's Open. Points were doubled in major championships, and top-20 finishes during the 2019 LPGA Tour season earned 50% more points than those in 2017 and 2018.

== Teams ==
Team Europe
Player	Country	Age	Points rank	Rolex ranking	Previous appearances	Matches	W–L–H	Winning percentage
Catriona Matthew	Scotland	50	Non-playing captain					
Laura Davies	England	55	Non-playing assistant captain					
Kathryn Imrie	Scotland	52	Non-playing assistant captain					
Melissa Reid	England	31	Non-playing assistant captain^					
Carlota Ciganda	Spain	29	1	13	3	11	5–4–2	54.55
Anne van Dam	Netherlands	23	2	93	0	Rookie		
Caroline Hedwall	Sweden	30	3	116	3	13	8–4–1	65.38
Charley Hull	England	23	4	29	3	11	7–3–1	68.18
Georgia Hall	England	23	8	33	1	5	2–3–0	40.00
Azahara Muñoz	Spain	31		36	3	11	4–6–1	40.91
Caroline Masson	Germany	30		52	3	11	3–6–2	36.36
Anna Nordqvist	Sweden	32	14	60	5	20	11–7–2	60.00
Céline Boutier	France	25	6	61	0	Rookie		
Jodi Ewart Shadoff	England	31		78	2	7	3–4–0	42.86
Bronte Law	England	24		25	0	Rookie		
Suzann Pettersen	Norway	38		644	8	33	16–11–6	57.58

^Suzann Pettersen, previously named an assistant captain, was chosen as one of the captain's picks. Melissa Reid was named as the final assistant captain.
Bronte Law had not played in the required number of events to gain an automatic place.
Ages on first day of matches, 13 September; Rolex rankings at team selection on 12 August.
Captain's picks shown in yellow.

Team USA
Player	Age	Points rank	Rolex ranking	Previous appearances	Matches	W–L–H	Winning percentage
Juli Inkster	59	Non-playing captain					
Pat Hurst	50	Non-playing assistant captain					
Nancy Lopez	62	Non-playing assistant captain					
Wendy Ward	46	Non-playing assistant captain					
Lexi Thompson	24	1	3	3	11	5–2–4	63.64
Nelly Korda	21	2	10	0	Rookie		
Danielle Kang	26	3	15	1	4	3–1–0	75.00
Lizette Salas	30	4	17	3	10	4–4–2	50.00
Jessica Korda	26	5	18	1	4	1–2–1	37.50
Megan Khang	21	6	46	0	Rookie		
Marina Alex	29	7	32	0	Rookie		
Brittany Altomare	28	8	40	0	Rookie		
Angel Yin	20	10	31	1	3	1–1–1	50.00
Annie Park	24	16	42	0	Rookie		
Morgan Pressel	31	20	55	5	19	10–7–2	57.89
Ally McDonald^	26	9	57	0	Rookie		

^Stacy Lewis was originally selected as a captain's pick but withdrew with a back injury.
Ages on first day of matches, 13 September; Rolex rankings at team selection on 26 August.
Captain's picks shown in yellow.

== Day one ==
Friday, 13 September 2019

=== Morning foursomes ===
Jessica Korda and Nelly Korda became the first sisters to be paired together in the Solheim Cup. They were 5 up after 7 holes, eventually winning 6&4 and scoring the first point. Of the remaining three matches, Europe won two and halved the other to take a 2 1/2 to 1 1/2 lead.

	Results
Ciganda/Law	halved	Pressel/Alex
Hall/Boutier	(Europe) 2 & 1	Thompson/Altomare
Masson/Ewart Shadoff	(United States) 6 & 4	J. Korda/N. Korda
Hull/Muñoz	(Europe) 2 & 1	Khang/Park
2 1/2	Session	1 1/2
2 1/2	Overall	1 1/2

=== Afternoon four-ball ===
Both captains selected the four players who hadn't played in the morning session to play in the opening two afternoon matches. Because of a late finish by Hull and Muñoz in the morning session, Match 3 (Hull/Muñoz v N. Korda/Altomare) started after Match 4 (Ciganda/Law v J. Korda/Thompson). The table below reflects the official order.

Ally McDonald and Angel Yin were dormie 7 up in their match against Anna Nordqvist and Caroline Hedwall, and although the Swedish pair won the 12th hole, McDonald and Yin won 7&5, tying a Solheim Cup record for largest four-ball victory. In the last two matches the European pairs led playing the final hole but both American pairs won the 18th to halve both matches.

	Results
Pettersen/van Dam	(Europe) 4 & 2	Kang/Salas
Nordqvist/Hedwall	(United States) 7 & 5	McDonald/Yin
Hull/Muñoz	halved	N. Korda/Altomare
Ciganda/Law	halved	J. Korda/Thompson
2	Session	2
4 1/2	Overall	3 1/2

== Day two ==
Saturday, 14 September 2019

=== Morning foursomes ===
Anna Nordqvist and Anne van Dam were 4 up after 6 holes against Morgan Pressel and Marina Alex but the Americans then won 7 of the next 9 holes, winning the match 2&1. Jessica Korda and Nelly Korda won their second foursomes match, this time winning 6&5, after winning their first match 6&4. Europe won the remaining two matches to leave the session tied.

	Results
Nordqvist/van Dam	(United States) 2 & 1	Pressel/Alex
Hall/Boutier	(Europe) 3 & 2	Salas/McDonald
Hull/Muñoz	(Europe) 4 & 3	Kang/Khang
Ciganda/Law	(United States) 6 & 5	J. Korda/N. Korda
2	Session	2
6 1/2	Overall	5 1/2

=== Afternoon four-ball ===
Ally McDonald and Angel Yin were 3 up with 5 holes to play against Georgia Hall and Céline Boutier but the European pair won the last five holes to win the match, 2 up. The United States won two matches and halved the other, leaving the match tied with the 12 singles matches to be played.

	Results
Pettersen/van Dam	(United States) 1 up	Altomare/Park
Ewart Shadoff/Masson	halved	Thompson/Alex
Hall/Boutier	(Europe) 2 up	McDonald/Yin
Ciganda/Muñoz	(United States) 2 & 1	Salas/Kang
1 1/2	Session	2 1/2
8	Overall	8

== Day three ==
Sunday, 15 September 2019

=== Singles ===
In one of the greatest finishes in the history of match play golf, the Europeans won each of the last 3 games to regain the cup. Bronte Law holed a 15 footer on 16 to go 1-up with 2 to play against Ally McDonald, who missed a short putt on 17 to give Law the win and level it up. Less than a minute later, Suzann Pettersen held her nerve to hole the winning 7-footer on the 18th green of the last match out on the course for Europe's first Solheim Cup win since 2013.

	Results
Carlota Ciganda	(Europe) 1 up	Danielle Kang
Caroline Hedwall	(United States) 2 up	Nelly Korda
Georgia Hall	(Europe) 2 & 1	Lexi Thompson
Céline Boutier	(Europe) 2 & 1	Annie Park
Azahara Muñoz	(United States) 2 & 1	Angel Yin
Charley Hull	halved	Megan Khang
Anne van Dam	(United States) 1 up	Lizette Salas
Caroline Masson	(United States) 3 & 2	Jessica Korda
Jodi Ewart Shadoff	(United States) 5 & 4	Brittany Altomare
Suzann Pettersen	(Europe) 1 up	Marina Alex
Bronte Law	(Europe) 2 & 1	Ally McDonald
Anna Nordqvist	(Europe) 4 & 3	Morgan Pressel
6 1/2	Session	5 1/2
14 1/2	Overall	13 1/2

== Individual player records ==
Each entry refers to the win–loss–half record of the player.

=== Europe ===
Player	Points	Overall	Singles	Foursomes	Fourballs
Céline Boutier	4	4–0–0	1–0–0	2–0–0	1–0–0
Carlota Ciganda	2	1–2–2	1–0–0	0–1–1	0–1–1
Jodi Ewart Shadoff	0.5	0–2–1	0–1–0	0–1–0	0–0–1
Georgia Hall	4	4–0–0	1–0–0	2–0–0	1–0–0
Caroline Hedwall	0	0–2–0	0–1–0	0–0–0	0–1–0
Charley Hull	3	2–0–2	0–0–1	2–0–0	0–0–1
Bronte Law	2	1–1–2	1–0–0	0–1–1	0–0–1
Caroline Masson	0.5	0–2–1	0–1–0	0–1–0	0–0–1
Azahara Muñoz	2.5	2–2–1	0–1–0	2–0–0	0–1–1
Anna Nordqvist	1	1–2–0	1–0–0	0–1–0	0–1–0
Suzann Pettersen	2	2–1–0	1–0–0	0–0–0	1–1–0
Anne van Dam	1	1–3–0	0–1–0	0–1–0	1–1–0

=== United States ===
Player	Points	Overall	Singles	Foursomes	Fourballs
Marina Alex	2	1–1–2	0–1–0	1–0–1	0–0–1
Brittany Altomare	2.5	2–1–1	1–0–0	0–1–0	1–0–1
Danielle Kang	1	1–3–0	0–1–0	0–1–0	1–1–0
Megan Khang	0.5	0–2–1	0–0–1	0–2–0	0–0–0
Jessica Korda	3.5	3–0–1	1–0–0	2–0–0	0–0–1
Nelly Korda	3.5	3–0–1	1–0–0	2–0–0	0–0–1
Ally McDonald	1	1–3–0	0–1–0	0–1–0	1–1–0
Annie Park	1	1–2–0	0–1–0	0–1–0	1–0–0
Morgan Pressel	1.5	1–1–1	0–1–0	1–0–1	0–0–0
Lizette Salas	2	2–2–0	1–0–0	0–1–0	1–1–0
Lexi Thompson	1	0–2–2	0–1–0	0–1–0	0–0–2
Angel Yin	2	2–1–0	1–0–0	0–0–0	1–1–0

== See also ==
- 2019 LPGA Tour
- Ryder Cup
