= LPGA Tour Championship =

Golf tournament

Tournament information
- Location: Orlando, Florida, U.S.
- Established: 2009
- Course(s): Grand Cypress Golf Club (North/South nines)
- Par: 72
- Length: 6,518 yards (5,960 m)
- Tour: LPGA Tour
- Format: Stroke play - 72 holes
- Prize fund: $1,500,000
- Month played: December
- Final year: 2010

Final champion
- (Sweden) Maria Hjorth

The LPGA Tour Championship, in full the LPGA Tour Championship Presented by Rolex, was the season-ending women's professional golf tournament on the U.S.-based LPGA Tour. After two seasons it was discontinued, replaced by the CME Group Titleholders in 2011.

The tournament was created in 2009 to replace the ADT Championship, which was discontinued after ADT decided not to extend its sponsorship. The LPGA Tour Championship was not considered an extension of the ADT and its inaugural edition was in 2009.

== Stanford Financial and SEC action ==
In November 2008 Stanford Financial was announced as the new sponsor of the tournament with a purse of $2 million. On February 17, 2009 the Securities and Exchange Commission accused Stanford chairman Allen R. Stanford in an $8 billion investment fraud scheme, and the Houston offices of Stanford Financial were raided and the firm's assets were frozen. In response to this action, the LPGA issued a statement that it was "monitoring developments regarding the situation."

On May 26, 2009, the LPGA announced that the tournament would still take place, without a sponsor and with the purse lowered to $1.5 million. The tournament would be known as the LPGA Tour Championship. In September, Rolex was added as the presenting sponsor. The 2009 tournament was played at the Houstonian Golf and Country Club in Richmond, Texas, southwest of Houston.

== Importance in year-end awards ==
In close races for LPGA season titles, the last tournament of the year often determines the winners of the year-end awards: Player of the Year, Rookie of the Year, Vare Trophy (lowest scoring average), and the Money List leader.

== 2009 tournament ==
Anna Nordqvist of Sweden finished the 54 holes at 13-under par, carding a 65 in the third round on Monday for a two stroke-victory over runner-up Lorena Ochoa. The tournament was originally planned as a 72-hole event, but November weather intervened; Friday's second round was delayed and then curtailed by darkness, and weekend play was canceled due to rain. The second round was completed on Monday morning and the 36-hole cut was made, and the third round commenced immediately in calm and sunny conditions. The final day also held a large amount of suspense for the Player of the Year race between top-ranked Lorena Ochoa of Mexico and the year's leading rookie, Jiyai Shin of South Korea. Ochoa's second-place finish secured the Player of the Year award.

== 2010 tournament ==
After months of uncertainty, the LPGA announced in early August that the 2010 LPGA Tour Championship would be played December 2–5 at the Grand Cypress Golf Club in Orlando, Florida. The 120-player field was reduced to the top-70 and ties after 36 holes, and the top-30 and ties after 54 holes. Maria Hjorth of Sweden shot a final round 72 to finish at 283 (-5) and won by a single stroke over runner-up Amy Yang.

== Field of players ==
The field was made up of the top 120 players on the LPGA official money list following the Mizuno Classic in November.

== Winners ==
Year	Dates	Champion	Winning score	To par	Margin of victory	Runner-up	Tournament Location	Purse ($)	Winner's share ($)
2010	Dec 2–5	(Sweden) Maria Hjorth	72-68-71-72=283	−5	1 stroke	(South Korea) Amy Yang	Grand Cypress Golf Club	1,500,000	225,000
2009	Nov 19–22	(Sweden) Anna Nordqvist	70-68-65=203^{1}	−13	2 strokes	(Mexico) Lorena Ochoa	Houstonian Golf & C.C.	1,500,000	225,000

^{1} The 2009 tournament was shortened to 54 holes due to weather.

== Tournament records ==
Year	Player	Score	Round	Course
2009	(South Korea) Na Yeon Choi	64 (−8)	3rd round	Houstonian Golf & Country Club
