= 2016 Symetra Tour =

The 2016 Symetra Tour was a series of professional women's golf tournaments held from February through October 2016 in the United States. The Symetra Tour is the second-tier women's professional golf tour in the United States and is the "official developmental tour" of the LPGA Tour. It was previously known as the Futures Tour. In 2016, total prize money on the Symetra Tour was $3,200,000, up from $2,420,000 in 2015.

== Leading money winners ==
The top ten money winners at the end of the season gained fully exempt cards on the LPGA Tour for the 2017 season.

| Rank | Player | Country | Events | Prize money ($) |
|---|---|---|---|---|
| 1 | Madelene Sagström | Sweden | 15 | 167,064 |
| 2 | Ally McDonald | United States | 18 | 110,359 |
| 3 | Jackie Stoelting | United States | 20 | 97,886 |
| 4 | Wichanee Meechai | Thailand | 19 | 86,217 |
| 5 | Laura Gonzalez Escallon | Belgium | 20 | 77,997 |
| 6 | Sherman Santiwiwatthanaphong | Thailand | 19 | 77,555 |
| 7 | Dana Finkelstein | United States | 19 | 76,314 |
| 8 | Marissa Steen | United States | 20 | 72,496 |
| 9 | Nelly Korda | United States | 19 | 70,129 |
| 10 | Peiyun Chien | Chinese Taipei | 21 | 67,577 |

== Schedule and results ==
The number in parentheses after winners' names show the player's total number of official money, individual event wins on the Symetra Tour including that event:

| Date | Tournament | Location | Winner | Purse | Note |
|---|---|---|---|---|---|
| Feb 21 | IOA Championship | California | (United States) Erynne Lee (1) | $100,000 | |
| Apr 10 | Florida's Natural Charity Classic | Florida | (Canada) Samantha Richdale (4) | $175,000 | |
| Apr 17 | Chico's Patty Berg Memorial | Florida | (Sweden) Madelene Sagström (1) | $200,000 | Joint event with the Legends Tour |
| Apr 24 | Guardian Retirement Championship | Florida | (United States) Brittany Altomare (1) | $110,000 | |
| May 8 | Self Regional Healthcare Foundation Classic | South Carolina | (Sweden) Madelene Sagström (2) | $250,000 | Joint event with the Legends Tour |
| May 15 | Symetra Classic | North Carolina | (United States) Erica Popson (1) | $150,000 | |
| May 21 | Gosling's Dark 'n Stormy Classic | Georgia | (United States) Laura Wearn (1) | $100,000 | |
| May 29 | W.B. Mason Championship | Massachusetts | (United States) Natalie Sheary (1) | $125,000 | |
| Jun 5 | Fuccillo Kia Championship | New York | (United States) Jackie Stoelting (3) | $125,000 | |
| Jun 19 | Four Winds Invitational | Indiana | (United States) Jackie Stoelting (4) | $150,000 | |
| Jun 26 | Island Resort Championship | Michigan | (Thailand) Sherman Santiwiwatthanaphong (2) | $125,000 | |
| Jul 3 | Tullymore Classic | Michigan | (Colombia) Paola Moreno (3) | $100,000 | |
| Jul 17 | Danielle Downey Credit Union Classic | New York | (Philippines) Clariss Guce (1) | $200,000 | |
| Jul 24 | FireKeepers Casino Hotel Championship | Michigan | (Belgium) Laura Gonzalez Escallon (1) | $100,000 | |
| Jul 31 | Kansas City Championship | Missouri | (Chinese Taipei) Peiyun Chien (1) | $100,000 | |
| Aug 14 | Decatur-Forsyth Classic | Illinois | (Philippines) Clariss Guce (2) | $130,000 | |
| Aug 21 | PHC Classic | Wisconsin | (Belgium) Laura Gonzalez Escallon (2) | $100,000 | |
| Sep 4 | Sioux Falls GreatLIFE Challenge | South Dakota | (United States) Nelly Korda (1) | $210,000 | |
| Sep 11 | Garden City Charity Classic at Buffalo Dunes | Kansas | (United States) Dana Finkelstein (1) | $150,000 | |
| Sep 18 | Garden City Charity Classic Presented by Mariah Fund | Kansas | (United States) Christine Song (5) | $100,000 | |
| Oct 2 | Murphy USA El Dorado Shootout | Arkansas | (Sweden) Madelene Sagström (3) | $100,000 | Earned promotion to LPGA Tour |
| Oct 9 | IOA Golf Classic | Florida | Canceled due to Hurricane Matthew | $100,000 | |
| Oct 16 | Symetra Tour Championship | Florida | (Denmark) Nicole Broch Larsen (1) | $200,000 | |

== Awards ==
- Player of the Year, player who leads the money list at the end of the season
  - (Sweden) Madelene Sagström
- Gaëlle Truet Rookie of the Year Award, first year player with the highest finish on the official money list
  - (Sweden) Madelene Sagström

== See also ==
- 2016 LPGA Tour
- 2016 in golf
