= Jennifer Kupcho =

American professional golfer (born 1997)

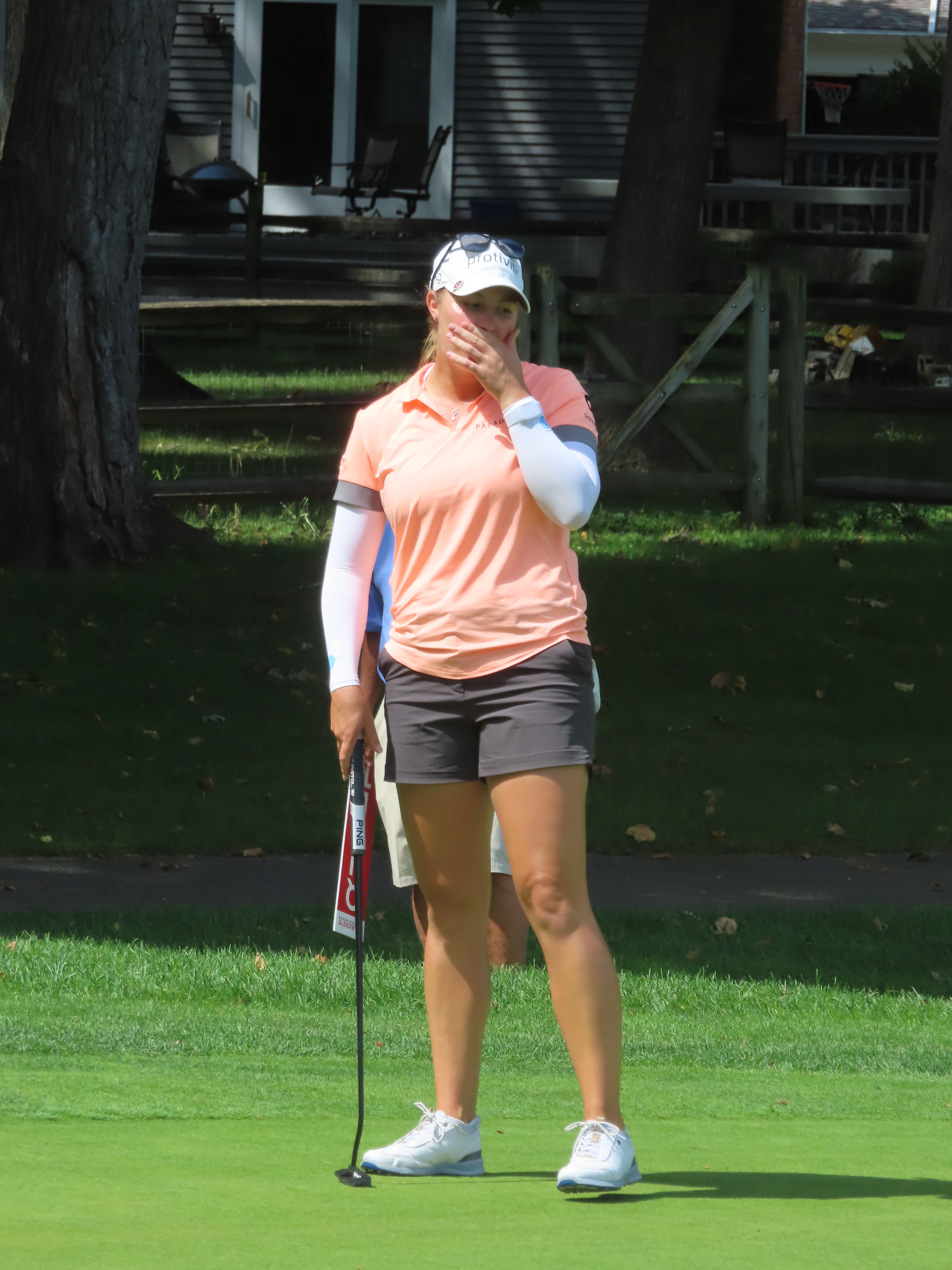
- Kupcho at the 2022 Dana Open

Personal information
- Nationality: United States
- Born: May 14, 1997 (age 29) Littleton, Colorado, U.S.
- Height: 5 ft 6 in (168 cm)
- Spouse: Jay Monahan

Career
- Sport: Golf
- College: Wake Forest
- Turned professional: 2019
- Current tour: LPGA Tour
- Professional wins: 5

Number of wins by tour
- LPGA Tour: 4
- Other: 1

Best results in LPGA major championships (wins: 1)
- Chevron Championship: Won: 2022
- Women's PGA C'ship: T7: 2020
- U.S. Women's Open: T8: 2026
- Women's British Open: T37: 2022
- Evian Championship: T2: 2019

Achievements and awards
- Honda Sports Award: 2018
- Mark H. McCormack Medal: 2018

Jennifer Anne Kupcho (born May 14, 1997) is an American professional golfer. She has won five professional tournaments including four on the LPGA Tour. She has won one major—the 2022 Chevron Championship. She has represented the United States in four Solheim Cups, and was on the winning team in 2024.

== Amateur career ==
As a junior at Wake Forest University, she was named the winner of the Honda Sports Award for golf. As a senior, Kupcho won the inaugural Augusta National Women's Amateur in 2019. She also won the 2018 NCAA Division I Golf Championship. Kupcho was the number one ranked women's amateur golfer in the world for a total of 34 weeks, rising to the top on three occasions, the first time on July 11, 2018.

== Professional career ==
Kupcho turned professional prior to the start of the 2019 U.S. Women's Open. She had earned her LPGA Tour card through the LPGA Qualifying Tournament in November 2018 but deferred playing until she finished her college career.

She set a 54-hole record in the 2022 Chevron Championship tournament in having a 16-under-par total (200) with her eight-under-par 64 in the third round. She beat the previous total by two strokes. She won the tournament by two strokes over Jessica Korda.

== Amateur wins ==
- 2014 Colorado Junior Stroke Play Championship
- 2015 CWGA Stroke Play Championship
- 2016 CWGA Match Play Championship, CWGA Stroke Play Championship, Ruth's Chris Tar Heel Invite, The Landfall Tradition
- 2017 NCAA Athens Regional, CWGA Stroke Play Championship, Canadian Women's Amateur, Ocean Course Invitational
- 2018 Bryan National Collegiate, NCAA Tallahassee Regional, NCAA Division I Women's Golf Championship (individual)
- 2019 Tar Heel Classic Casa de Campo, Bryan National Collegiate, Augusta National Women's Amateur

== Professional wins (5) ==
=== LPGA Tour wins (4) ===
Legend
Major championships (1)
Other LPGA Tour (1)

No.	Date	Tournament	Winning score	To par	Margin of victory	Runner(s)-up	Winner's share ($)
1	Apr 3, 2022	Chevron Championship	66-70-64-74=274	−14	2 strokes	(United States) Jessica Korda	750,000
2	Jun 19, 2022	Meijer LPGA Classic	63-67-69-71=270	−18	Playoff	(Republic of Ireland) Leona Maguire (United States) Nelly Korda	375,000
3	Jul 16, 2022	Dow Great Lakes Bay Invitational (with (United States) Lizette Salas)	68-61-64-61=254	−26	5 strokes	(Finland) Matilda Castren and (Malaysia) Kelly Tan	303,810 (each)
4	Jun 8, 2025	ShopRite LPGA Classic	68-64-66=198	–15	1 stroke	(South Korea) Ilhee Lee	262,500

LPGA Tour playoff record (1–1)

No.	Year	Tournament	Opponent(s)	Result
1	2022	Meijer LPGA Classic	(Republic of Ireland) Leona Maguire (United States) Nelly Korda	Won with a birdie on the second extra hole; Korda eliminated by birdie on first hole
2	2023	Mizuho Americas Open	(United States) Rose Zhang	Lost to par on second extra hole

=== Other wins (1) ===
- 2020 Colorado Women's Open

== Results in LPGA majors ==
=== Wins (1) ===
Year	Championship	54 holes	Winning score	Margin	Runner-up
2022	Chevron Championship	6 shot lead	−14 (66-70-64-74=274)	2 strokes	(United States) Jessica Korda

=== Results timeline ===
Results not in chronological order.

Tournament	2016	2017	2018	2019	2020	2021	2022	2023	2024	2025	2026
Chevron Championship					T22	T60	1	CUT	T23	CUT	T12
U.S. Women's Open	CUT	T21		T62	T30	T26	T40	CUT	CUT	CUT	T8
Women's PGA Championship				CUT	T7	T58	T16	CUT	T35	T23	CUT
The Evian Championship				T2	NT	T50	T31	T14	T22	T11	T16
Women's British Open				CUT	CUT	64	T37	CUT	CUT	CUT	CUT

Win
Top 10
Did not play

CUT = missed the half-way cut
NT = no tournament
T = tied

=== Summary ===
Tournament	Wins	2nd	3rd	Top-5	Top-10	Top-25	Events	Cuts made
Chevron Championship	1	0	0	1	1	4	7	5
U.S. Women's Open	0	0	0	0	1	2	10	6
Women's PGA Championship	0	0	0	0	1	3	8	5
The Evian Championship	0	1	0	1	1	5	7	7
Women's British Open	0	0	0	0	0	0	8	2
Totals	1	1	0	2	4	14	40	25

- Most consecutive cuts made – 13 (2020 ANA – 2022 Women's British Open)
- Longest streak of top-10s – 1 (four times)

== LPGA Tour career summary ==
Year	Tournaments played	Cuts made*	Wins	2nd	3rd	Top 10s	Best finish	Earnings ($)	Money list rank	Scoring average	Scoring rank
2016	1	0	0	0	0	0	CUT	n/a	n/a	77.50	n/a
2017	1	1	0	0	0	0	T21	n/a	n/a	72.00	n/a
2018	1	1	0	0	0	0	T16	n/a	n/a	68.75	n/a
2019	19	11	0	1	0	3	T2	525,432	39	71.18	46
2020	14	10	0	1	0	2	2	381,160	29	71.79	53
2021	23	19	0	1	1	5	2	591,680	35	70.60	28
2022	26	22	3	0	0	4	1	1,955,531	7	70.59	30
2023	23	18	0	1	0	2	2	708,648	39	70.82	38
2024	26	23	0	1	1	6	2	1,158,094	24	70.98	33
2025	23	18	1	1	0	3	1	1,169,069	35	70.23	16
Totals^	154 (2019)	121 (2019)	4	6	2	25	1	6,489,614	66		

^ Official as of 2025 season
*Includes matchplay and other tournaments without a cut.

== World ranking ==
Position in Women's World Golf Rankings at the end of each calendar year.

Year	Ranking	Source
2017	430	
2018	536	
2019	53	
2020	19	
2021	42	
2022	13	
2023	39	
2024	47	
2025	32	

== U.S. national team appearances ==
Amateur

- Arnold Palmer Cup: 2018 (winners)
- Curtis Cup: 2018 (winners)
- Espirito Santo Trophy: 2018 (winners)

Professional

- Solheim Cup: 2021, 2023, 2024 (winners), 2026

=== Solheim Cup record ===
Year	Total matches	Total W–L–H	Singles W–L–H	Foursomes W–L–H	Fourballs W–L–H	Points won	Points %
Career	14	4–8–2	1–3–0	1–5–0	2–0–2	5.0	35.7
2021	4	2–1–1	0–1–0 lost to L. Maguire 5&4	1–0–0 won w/ L. Salas 3&1	1–1–0 won w/ L. Salas 1 up halved w/ L. Salas	2.5	62.5
2023	3	0–2–1	0–1–0 lost to A. Nordqvist 2&1	0–1–0 lost w/ L. Vu 2&1	0–0–1 halved w/ A. Corpuz	0.5	16.7
2024	3	1–2–0	1–0–0 def. L. Grant 2&1	0–2–0 lost w/ A. Ewing 2 dn lost w/ A. Ewing 1 dn	0–0–0	1.0	33.3
2026	4	1–3–0	0–1–0 lost to C. Ciganda 4&2	0–2–0 lost w/ R. Zhang 3&2 lost w/ R. Zhang 1 dn	1–0–0 won w/ L. Duncan 1 up	1.0	25.0
