= 2013 Symetra Tour =

The 2013 Symetra Tour was a series of professional women's golf tournaments held from February through September 2013 in the United States. The Symetra Tour is the second-tier women's professional golf tour in the United States and is the "official developmental tour" of the LPGA Tour. It was previously known as the Futures Tour. In 2013, total prize money on the Symetra Tour was $1,625,000.

== Leading money winners ==
The top ten money winners at the end of the season gained fully exempt cards on the LPGA Tour for the 2014 season.

Rank	Player	Country	Events	Prize money ($)
1	P.K. Kongkraphan	Thailand	14	47,283
2	Giulia Molinaro	Italy	15	39,848
3	Marina Alex	United States	14	39,804
4	Christine Song	United States	14	39,309
5	Cydney Clanton	United States	12	38,861
6	Sue Kim	Canada	12	37,850
7	Hannah Jun	United States	15	36,810
8	Perrine Delacour	France	14	34,577
9	Alena Sharp	Canada	8	34,120
10	Jaclyn Sweeney	United States	14	33,609

== Schedule and results ==
The number in parentheses after winners' names show the player's total number of official money, individual event wins on the Symetra Tour including that event.

Date	Tournament	Location	Winner
Feb 22–24	VisitMesa.com Gateway Classic	Arizona	(United States) Jaclyn Sweeney (2)
Mar 22–24	Florida's Natural Charity Classic	Florida	(United States) Melissa Eaton (1)
Apr 26–28	Guardian Retirement Championship	Florida	(United States) Christine Song (3)
May 9–11	Symetra Classic	North Carolina	(United States) Laura Kueny (1)
May 17–19	Friends of Mission Charity Classic	North Carolina	(Italy) Giulia Molinaro (1)
Jun 14–16	Decatur-Forsyth Classic	Illinois	(Canada) Sue Kim (1)
Jun 21–23	Four Winds Invitational	Indiana	(United States) Cydney Clanton (1)
Jun 28–30	Island Resort Championship	Michigan	(United States) Kim Kaufman (1)
Jul 12–14	Credit Union Challenge	New York	(Taiwan) Wei-Ling Hsu (1)
Jul 19–21	Northeast Delta Dental International	New Hampshire	(Thailand) P.K. Kongkraphan (1)
Jul 26–28	Credit Union Classic	New York	(United Kingdom) Olivia Jordan-Higgins (1)
Aug 9–11	IOA Golf Classic	Florida	(United States) Katy Harris (1)
Aug 16–18	Eagle Classic	Virginia	(United States) Christine Song (4)
Sep 20–22	Volvik Championship	Florida	(United States) Hannah Yun (1)
Sep 26–29	Symetra Tour Championship	Florida	(United States) Megan McChrystal (2)

== Awards ==
- Player of the Year, player who leads the money list at the end of the season
  - (Thailand) P.K. Kongkraphan
- Gaëlle Truet Rookie of the Year Award, first year player with the highest finish on the official money list
  - (Italy) Giulia Molinaro
- Heather Wilbur Spirit Award, a player who "best exemplifies dedication, courage, perseverance, love of the game and spirit toward achieving goals as a professional golfer."
  - (United States) Melissa Eaton

== See also ==
- 2013 LPGA Tour
- 2013 in golf
