= Anna Nordqvist =

Swedish professional golfer (born 1987)

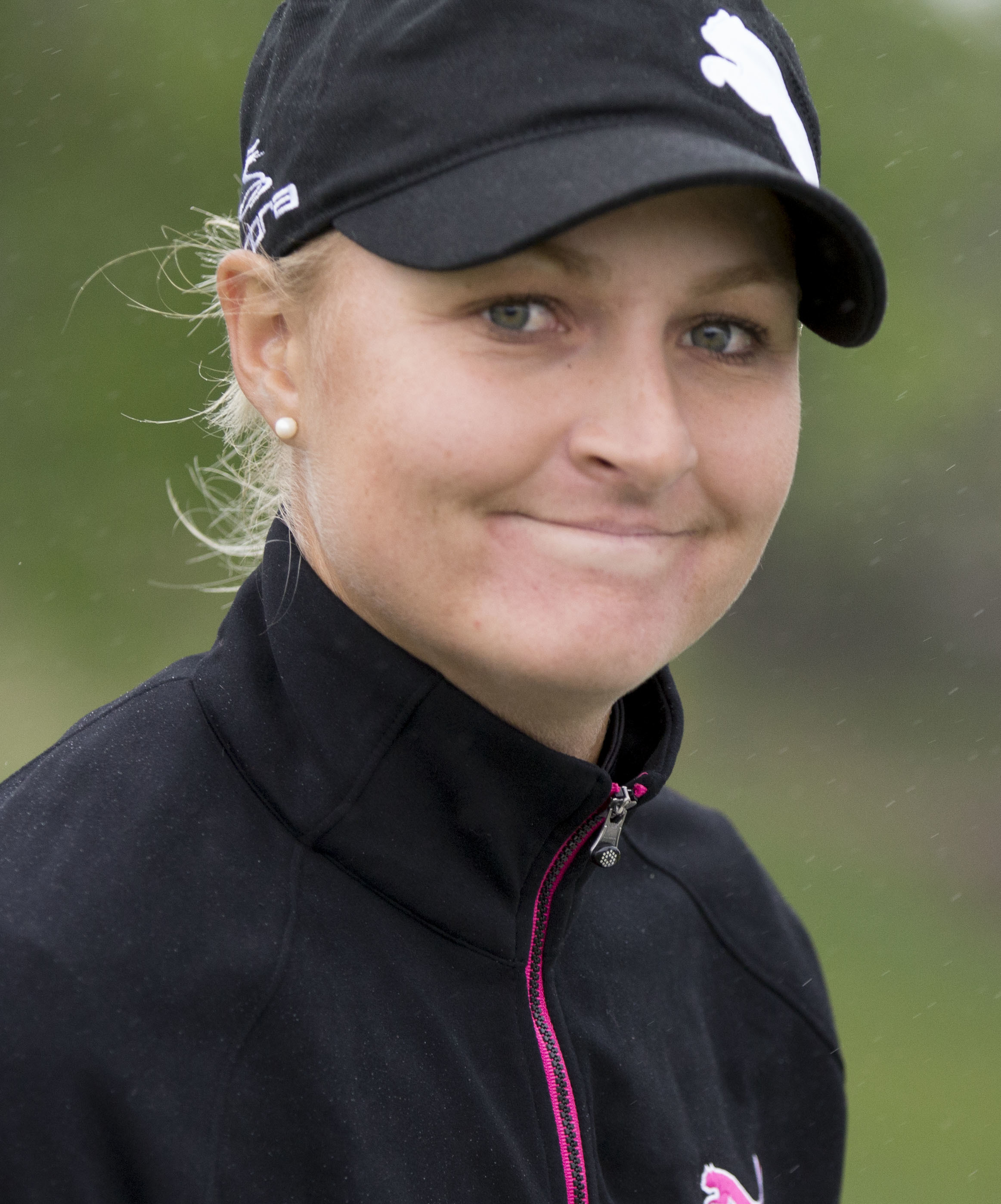
- Nordqvist at the 2013 Kingsmill Championship

Personal information
- Full name: Anna Maria Nordqvist
- Nationality: Sweden
- Born: 10 June 1987 (age 39) Eskilstuna, Sweden
- Height: 6 ft 0 in (183 cm)

Career
- Sport: Golf
- College: Arizona State University (2.5 years)
- Turned professional: 2008
- Current tours: LPGA Tour (joined 2009); Ladies European Tour (joined 2009)
- Professional wins: 16

Number of wins by tour
- LPGA Tour: 9
- Ladies European Tour: 5
- Other: 4

Best results in LPGA major championships (wins: 3)
- Chevron Championship: T4: 2015
- Women's PGA C'ship: Won: 2009
- U.S. Women's Open: 2nd: 2016
- Women's British Open: Won: 2021
- Evian Championship: Won: 2017

Achievements and awards
- NGCA Freshman of the Year: 2007
- Pac-10 Player of the Year: 2007
- Swedish Golfer of the Year: 2009, 2017, 2021
- LET Rookie of the Year: 2009
- LET Lowest stroke average: 2017

Anna Maria Nordqvist (born 10 June 1987) is a Swedish professional golfer. She plays on the U.S.-based LPGA Tour and the Ladies European Tour. She has won three major championships: the 2009 LPGA Championship, the 2017 Evian Championship, and the 2021 Women's British Open. She is the only non-American woman to have won major championships in three different decades (2000s, 2010s and 2020s).

== Early life ==
In 1987, Nordqvist was born in Eskilstuna, Sweden. She was a successful amateur golfer in both Europe and the United States. Nordqvist was Swedish Junior Player of the Year (2004, 2005), Swedish Amateur of the Year (2005), Girls Amateur Champion (2005), bronze medallist at the European Ladies Amateur Championship (2005), runner-up at the British Ladies Amateur in 2006 and 2007, and finally winner of the championship in her third successive final in 2008.

Nordqvist made the cut at the Ricoh Women's British Open in both 2007 and 2008 and earned the Smyth Salver for low amateur honours in 2008.

== Amateur career ==
By the end of her freshman year at Arizona State University in 2007, she was Pac-10 co-champion and was named National Golf Coaches Association (NGCA) Freshman of the Year, Pac-10 Player of the Year and Newcomer of the Year. NGCA First-Team All-American and Academic All-American honors were gained in both 2007 and 2008. She tied for fifth at the 2008 NCAA Championships (won by ASU teammate Azahara Muñoz).

Nordqvist was part of the winning Swedish team at the 2008 European Ladies' Team Championship and was a member of the victorious Swedish team at the 2008 World Amateur Team Championships for the Espirito Santo Trophy, finishing individual runner-up to teammate Caroline Hedwall.

In December 2008, she tied for 25th at the LPGA Final Qualifying Tournament and turned professional immediately following the final round.

== Professional career ==
Already qualified for the LPGA Tour, she also qualified for the Ladies European Tour In January 2009, by winning the Ladies European Tour Final Qualifying School.

In only her fifth start on the LPGA Tour, Nordqvist won her first professional tournament and major, the LPGA Championship in Maryland in June 2009. This led to her selection as a captain's pick for the Solheim Cup. In November, she won the LPGA Tour Championship for her second victory of the season. She was named Rookie of the Year on the Ladies European Tour and finished runner-up to Jiyai Shin for LPGA Rolex Rookie of the Year honors.

At the 2013 Solheim Cup, Nordqvist won her alternate shot match with Caroline Hedwall with a hole-in-one at the 17th hole, beating Morgan Pressel and Jessica Korda 2 and 1 during the Saturday morning session. This was the first hole-in-one in Solheim Cup history.

At the end of May 2015, Nordqvist won her fifth official tournament on the LPGA Tour. She birdied the second-to-last hole and bogeyed the 54th hole to win by one stroke over Dutchwoman Christel Boeljon in Galloway, New Jersey.

At the 2016 U.S. Women's Open, Nordqvist lost to Brittany Lang in a playoff due to a rules violation, for touching the sand with the club in a bunker. The rules violation occurred on the second of three playoff holes but was not disclosed to the players until mid-way through play on the third hole.

In September 2017, she won her second major, The Evian Championship in France, after overcoming American Brittany Altomare in a play-off in horrendous weather conditions.

In August 2021, she won her third major by winning the Women's British Open at Carnoustie Golf Links in Carnoustie, Scotland. For 2021, she had won only $283,715 in 14 tournaments before her $870,000 winning share from it, leaping to $1,153,715 and sixth place. With the win, she became only the second golfer, after Georgia Hall, to win The R&A treble - the Girls Amateur, British Ladies Amateur and Women's British Open.

Nordqvist won the 2022 Big Green Egg Open in The Netherlands, her first individual success on the Ladies European Tour outside of the majors.

Nordqvist was named captain of the 2026 European Solheim Cup team in February 2025.

Nordqvist announced that she would retire as a player in August 2026 following the FM Championship.

== Awards and honors ==
- In 2009, Nordqvist received Elit Sign number 135 by the Swedish Golf Federation based on world ranking achievements.
- In 2009, she was named Rookie of the Year on the Ladies European Tour.
- For the 2009, 2017 and 2021 seasons, she was named Swedish Golfer of the Year.
- In 2010, she was awarded honorary member of the PGA of Sweden.

== Personal life ==
Nordqvist lives in Scottsdale, Arizona.

== Amateur wins ==
- 2005 Girls Amateur Championship
- 2008 British Ladies Amateur Championship

== Professional wins (16) ==
=== LPGA Tour wins (9) ===
Legend
Major championships (3)
Other LPGA Tour (6)

No.	Date	Tournament	Winning score	To par	Margin of victory	Runner(s)-up	Winner's share ($)
1	14 Jun 2009	McDonald's LPGA Championship	66-70-69-68=273	−15	4 strokes	(Australia) Lindsey Wright	300,000
2	22 Nov 2009	LPGA Tour Championship	70-68-65=203	−13	2 strokes	(Mexico) Lorena Ochoa	225,000
3	23 Feb 2014	Honda LPGA Thailand	66-72-67-68=273	−15	2 strokes	(South Korea) Inbee Park	225,000
4	30 Mar 2014	Kia Classic	73-68-67-67=275	−13	1 stroke	(United States) Lizette Salas	255,000
5	31 May 2015	ShopRite LPGA Classic	67-69-69=205	−8	1 stroke	(Netherlands) Christel Boeljon	225,000
6	5 Jun 2016	ShopRite LPGA Classic (2)	64-68-64=196	−17	1 stroke	(Japan) Haru Nomura	225,000
7	19 Mar 2017	Bank of Hope Founders Cup	67-67-61-68=263	−25	2 strokes	(South Korea) Chun In-gee (Thailand) Ariya Jutanugarn (United States) Stacy Lewis	225,000
8	17 Sep 2017	The Evian Championship^{[1]}	66-72-66=204	−9	Playoff	(United States) Brittany Altomare	547,500
9	22 Aug 2021	AIG Women's Open^{[1]}	71-71-65-69=276	−12	1 stroke	(England) Georgia Hall (Sweden) Madelene Sagström (United States) Lizette Salas	870,000

^{1} Co-sanctioned by the Ladies European Tour.

LPGA Tour playoff record (1–1)

No.	Year	Tournament	Opponent(s)	Result
1	2016	U.S. Women's Open	(United States) Brittany Lang	Lost three-hole aggregate playoff: Lang: 3-4-5=12 (E), Nordqvist: 3-6-6=15 (+3)
2	2017	The Evian Championship	(United States) Brittany Altomare	Won with bogey on first extra hole

=== Ladies European Tour wins (5) ===
No.	Date	Tournament	Winning score	To par	Margin of victory	Runner(s)-up
1	25 Apr 2010	European Nations Cup (with (Sweden) Sophie Gustafson)	267	−21	Playoff	(Australia) Karen Lunn and (Australia) Karrie Webb
2	17 Apr 2011	Communitat Valenciana European Ladies Golf Cup (with (Sweden) Sophie Gustafson)	267	−21	3 strokes	(Germany) Caroline Masson and (Germany) Anja Monke (England) Laura Davies and (England) Melissa Reid
3	17 Sep 2017	The Evian Championship^{[2]}	70-68-66=204	−9	Playoff	(United States) Brittany Altomare
4	22 Aug 2021	AIG Women's Open^{[2]}	71-71-65-69=276	−12	1 stroke	(England) Georgia Hall (Sweden) Madelene Sagström (United States) Lizette Salas
5	17 Jul 2022	Big Green Egg Open	72-70-67-72=281	−7	1 stroke	(Austria) Sarah Schober

^{2} Co-sanctioned by the LPGA Tour.

Ladies European Tour playoff record (2–2)

No.	Year	Tournament	Opponent(s)	Result
1	2009	Madrid Ladies Masters	(Spain) Azahara Muñoz	Lost to eagle on first extra hole
2	2010	European Nations Cup (with (Sweden) Sophie Gustafson)	(Australia) Karen Lunn and (Australia) Karrie Webb	Won with birdie on third extra hole
3	2017	Estrella Damm Mediterranean Ladies Open	(Spain) Carlota Ciganda (England) Florentyna Parker	Parker won with birdie on fourth extra hole Ciganda eliminated by birdie on first extra hole
4	2017	The Evian Championship	(United States) Brittany Altomare	Won with bogey on first extra hole

=== Swedish Golf Tour wins (3) ===
No.	Date	Tournament	Winning score	To par	Margin of victory	Runner(s)-up	Ref
1	10 Jul 2004	Rejmes Ladies Open (as an amateur)	68-72-77=217	+1	Playoff	(Sweden) Nina Reis	
2	11 Jun 2005	Gullbergs Ladies Open (as an amateur)	72-70-71=213	E	3 strokes	(Norway) Line Berg (Sweden) Eva Bjärvall (Sweden) Linda Lindell (Sweden) Nina Reis (Sweden) Anna Tybring	
3	22 Aug 2008	SM Match (as an amateur)	1 up			(Sweden) Lisa Hed	

=== Other wins (1) ===
- 2010 (1) The Mojo 6 (unofficial tournament sanctioned by the LPGA Tour)

== Major championships ==
=== Wins (3) ===
Year	Championship	54 holes	Winning score	Margin	Runner(s)-up
2009	McDonald's LPGA Championship	2 shot lead	−15 (66-70-69-68=273)	4 strokes	(Australia) Lindsey Wright
2017	The Evian Championship	5 shot deficit	−9 (66-72-66=204)	Playoff^{1}	(United States) Brittany Altomare
2021	AIG Women's Open	Tied for lead	−12 (71-71-65-69=276)	1 stroke	(England) Georgia Hall, (Sweden) Madelene Sagström, (United States) Lizette Salas

^{1} Defeated Brittany Altomare in a sudden-death playoff: Nordqvist (5) and Altomare (6).

=== Results timeline ===
Results not in chronological order.

Tournament	2007	2008	2009	2010	2011	2012
Chevron Championship				T10	T10	T26
U.S. Women's Open			T26	CUT	CUT	T28
Women's PGA Championship			1	T25	T25	58
Women's British Open	T58	T42LA	T51	T69	T7	CUT

Tournament	2013	2014	2015	2016	2017	2018	2019	2020	2021	2022	2023	2024	2025	2026
Chevron Championship	T7	T16	T4	T26	T11	T40	T21	T44	T25	T65		T17	T59	CUT
U.S. Women's Open	T11	CUT	CUT	2	T33	CUT	T39	T54	T49	T6	CUT	T36	T31	T54
Women's PGA Championship	T12	T4	T9	T8	CUT	CUT	CUT	5	T58	T16	T3	CUT	CUT	T53
The Evian Championship	T44	T10	T50	T22	1	T44	CUT	NT	T38	T22	T20	T22	CUT	T7
Women's British Open	T11	T12	T7	T31	T7	CUT	T11	T32	1	CUT	T16	CUT	T30	T29

^ The Evian Championship was added as a major in 2013

Win
Top 10
Did not play

LA = low amateur
CUT = missed the half-way cut
NT = no tournament
"T" = tied

=== Summary ===
Tournament	Wins	2nd	3rd	Top-5	Top-10	Top-25	Events	Cuts made
Chevron Championship	0	0	0	1	4	9	16	15
U.S. Women's Open	0	1	0	1	2	3	18	12
Women's PGA Championship	1	0	1	4	6	10	18	13
The Evian Championship	1	0	0	1	3	7	13	11
Women's British Open	1	0	0	1	4	8	20	16
Totals	3	1	1	8	19	37	85	67

- Most consecutive cuts made – 14 (2019 British Open – 2022 Evian)
- Longest streak of top-10s – 4 (2014 WPGA – 2015 WPGA)

== LPGA Tour career summary ==
Year	Tournaments played	Cuts made*	Wins	2nd	3rd	Top 10s	Best finish	Earnings ($)	Money list rank	Scoring average	Scoring rank
2007	1	1	0	0	0	0	T58	n/a	n/a	76.50	n/a
2008	1	1	0	0	0	0	T42	n/a	n/a	71.25	n/a
2009	17	17	2	0	0	5	1	871,785	15	70.78	12
2010	21	18	0	1	0	4	T2	442,088	24	71.65	24
2011	20	18	0	1	0	5	T2	589,744	23	71.22	13
2012	27	25	0	0	0	11	T5	688,703	19	71.19	17
2013	26	26	0	0	1	5	3	678,751	20	70.83	16
2014	26	24	2	1	1	8	1	1,144,245	7	70.88	14
2015	25	24	1	0	1	10	1	977,743	10	70.31	6
2016	25	25	1	2	1	7	1	1,424,685	7	70.40	12
2017	20	17	2	1	1	6	1	1,335,164	8	70.24	17
2018	25	20	0	0	1	6	T3	502,041	47	70.79	24
2019	26	20	0	0	0	1	4	393,685	54	71.47	65
2020	14	14	0	1	0	4	2	572,179	15	71.21	22
2021	19	18	1	0	0	3	1	1,258,467	9	70.81	41
2022	21	20	0	0	1	2	3	1,064,670	23	71.00	47
2023	18	14	0	0	1	3	T3	879,325	33	70.70	30
2024	22	16	0	0	0	0	T12	475,773	77	71.71	75
2025	19	10	0	0	0	0	T30	243,597	97	72.64	129

Official as of 2025 season
* Includes match play and other events without a cut

== World ranking ==
Position in Women's World Golf Rankings at the end of each calendar year.

Year	Ranking	Notes
2008	332	
2009	7	
2010	14	
2011	31	
2012	28	
2013	26	
2014	12	
2015	13	
2016	14	
2017	7	
2018	30	
2019	89	
2020	54	
2021	15	
2022	30	
2023	52	
2024	93	
2025	215	

== Team appearances ==
Amateur

- European Girls' Team Championship (representing Sweden): 2005
- Junior Solheim Cup (representing Europe): 2005
- Espirito Santo Trophy (representing Sweden): 2006, 2008 (winners)
- Vagliano Trophy (representing the Continent of Europe): 2007 (winners)
- European Ladies' Team Championship (representing Sweden): 2007, 2008 (winners)

Professional

- Solheim Cup (representing Europe): 2009, 2011 (winners), 2013 (winners), 2015, 2017, 2019 (winners), 2021 (winners), 2023 (tied, cup retained, playing vice-captain), 2024 (playing vice-captain), 2026 (non-playing captain, winners)
- European Nations Cup (representing Sweden): 2010 (winners), 2011 (winners)
- International Crown (representing Sweden): 2014, 2018, 2023

=== Solheim Cup record ===
Year	Total matches	Total W–L–H	Singles W–L–H	Foursomes W–L–H	Fourballs W–L–H	Points won	Points %
Career	35	17–15–3	3–3–3	8–8–0	6–4–0	18.5	52.9
2009	4	2–2–0	0–1–0 lost to M. Pressel 3&2	1–1–0 won w/ M. Hjorth 3&2 lost w/ M. Hjorth 1 dn	1–0–0 won w/ S. Pettersen 1 up	2	50.0
2011	4	2–2–0	0–1–0 lost to M. Pressel 2&1	1–1–0 lost w/ M. Hjorth 2&1 won w/ M. Hjorth 3&2	1–0–0 won w/ S. Pettersen 2 up	2	50.0
2013	4	2–1–1	0–0–1 halved w/ S. Lewis	2–0–0 won w/ C. Hedwall 4&2 won w/ C. Hedwall 2&1	0–1–0 lost w/ G. Sergas 4&3	2.5	62.5
2015	4	2–2–0	1–0–0 def. S. Lewis 2&1	0–2–0 lost w/ S. Pettersen 3&2 lost w/ C. Hedwall 5&4	1–0–0 won w/ C. Hedwall 4&3	2	50.0
2017	4	3–0–1	0–0–1 halved w/ L. Thompson	2–0–0 won w/ G. Hall 3&1 won w/ G. Hall 2&1	1–0–0 won w/ J. Ewart Shadoff 4&2	3.5	87.5
2019	3	1–2–0	1–0–0 def. M. Pressel 4&3	0–1–0 lost w/ A. van Dam 2&1	0–1–0 lost w/ C. Hedwall 7&5	1	33.3
2021	4	2–1–1	0–0–1 halved w/ L. Thompson	1–1–0 won w/ M. Castren 1 up lost w/ M. Castren 3&1	1–0–0 won w/ M. Castren 4&3	2.5	62.5
2023	4	1–3–0	1–0–0 def. J. Kupcho 2&1	0–2–0 lost w/ L. Maguire 1 dn lost w/ L. Maguire 1 dn	0–1–0 lost w/ C. Hedwall 2 dn	1	25.0
2024	4	2–2–0	0–1–0 lost to A. Corpuz 4&3	1–0–0 won w/ C. Boutier 4&3	1–1–0 won w/ M. Sagström 6&5 lost w/ M. Sagström 4&3	2	50.0
