= 2021 Solheim Cup =

Women's team golf competition

- Dates: September 4–6, 2021
- Venue: Inverness Club
- Location: Toledo, Ohio
- Captains: Pat Hurst (USA); Catriona Matthew (Europe)
(United States)	13	15	(Europe)
- Europe wins the Solheim Cup

Location map
- Location in the United States Location in Ohio

The 2021 Solheim Cup was the 17th edition of the Solheim Cup matches, held from September 4–6 at the Inverness Club in Toledo, Ohio. The Solheim Cup is a biennial team competition between the top women professional golfers from Europe and the United States. Pat Hurst was captain of the U.S. team for the first time and Catriona Matthew was captain of the European team for the second time. The Inverness course was a par 72 and 6,903 yards (6,312 m).

The 2021 competition was won by Europe with 15 points to 13. It was the second victory by the European team in America, having first won there in 2013.

== Format ==
The competition is a three-day match play event between teams of twelve players with a similar format to the Ryder Cup, with each match worth one point. The format is as follows:

- Day 1 (Saturday): Four foursome (alternate shot) matches in a morning session and four fourball (better ball) matches in an afternoon session. A total of eight players from each team participate in each session.
- Day 2 (Sunday): Four foursome (alternate shot) matches in a morning session and four fourball (better ball) matches in an afternoon session. A total of eight players from each team participate in each session.
- Day 3 (Monday): 12 singles matches. All 12 players from each team participate.

With a total of 28 points, 14 1/2 points are required to win the Cup, and 14 points are required for the defending champion to retain the Cup. All matches are played to a maximum of 18 holes. If the score is even after 18 holes, each team earns one-half point.

== Team qualification and selection ==
=== Eligibility criteria ===
The European and United States teams had different eligibility criteria:

Team Europe

Members of the European team must:

1. be current members of the Ladies European Tour in any category or membership;
2. must be a "European national". To be a "European national", the player must satisfy the criteria set out in the "Nationality Policy" issued by the International Golf Federation.

There is no longer a minimum number of LET Ranking Events that must be played.

Team USA

Members of the United States team must be current members of the LPGA Tour and meet one of these three citizenship criteria:

- U.S. citizens by birth, regardless of their birthplace.
- Those who were naturalized as U.S. citizens before age 18.
- Those who became U.S. citizens by adoption before age 13.

=== Team selection ===
The European and United States teams are selected by different methods.

Team Europe

Team Europe consists of the top two players from the LET Solheim Cup standings, followed by the top four LET members on the Women's World Golf Rankings who were not already qualified via the Solheim Cup standings, and six captain's selections. The 2021 Women's British Open, held at Carnoustie Golf Links, Scotland, ending on August 22, was the final event of the qualification period, and the full team, including the captain's picks, was announced on August 23.

Team USA

Team USA consists of the leading seven players from the LPGA Solheim Cup points rankings, the top two players in the Women's World Golf Rankings not already qualified via the points rankings and three chosen by the team captain. LPGA Solheim Cup points are earned for top-20 finishes on the LPGA Tour over a two-year period ending on August 22 with the 2021 Women's British Open. Points are doubled in major championships, and top-20 finishes during the 2021 LPGA Tour season earned 50% more points than those in 2019 and 2020.

== Teams ==
Ages on first day of matches, September 4; Rolex rankings at team selection on August 23. Captain's picks shown in yellow.

Team USA
Player	Age	Points rank	Rolex ranking	Previous appearances	Matches	W–L–H	Winning percentage
Pat Hurst	52	Non-playing captain					
Angela Stanford	43	Non-playing assistant captain					
Michelle Wie West	31	Non-playing assistant captain					
Stacy Lewis	36	Non-playing assistant captain					
Nelly Korda	23	1	1	1	4	3–0–1	87.50
Danielle Kang	28	2	7	2	8	4–4–0	50.00
Ally Ewing	28	3	22	1	4	1–3–0	25.00
Lexi Thompson	26	4	12	4	15	5–4–6	53.33
Austin Ernst	29	5	27	1	4	2–2–0	50.00
Jessica Korda	28	6	17	2	8	4–2–2	62.50
Megan Khang	23	7	36	1	3	0–2–1	16.67
Lizette Salas	32	8	14	4	14	6–6–2	50.00
Jennifer Kupcho	24	12	28	0	Rookie		
Brittany Altomare	30	8	54	1	4	2–1–1	62.50
Mina Harigae	31	10	61	0	Rookie		
Yealimi Noh	20	11	31	0	Rookie		

Team Europe
Player	Country	Age	Points rank	Rolex ranking	Previous appearances	Matches	W–L–H	Winning percentage
Catriona Matthew	Scotland	52	Non-playing captain					
Laura Davies	England	57	Non-playing assistant captain					
Kathryn Imrie	Scotland	54	Non-playing assistant captain					
Suzann Pettersen	Norway	40	Non-playing assistant captain					
Emily Kristine Pedersen	Denmark	25	1	68	1	3	0–3–0	0.00
Georgia Hall	England	25	2	29	2	9	6–3–0	66.67
Anna Nordqvist	Sweden	34	3	16	6	23	12–9–2	56.52
Sophia Popov	Germany	28		30	0	Rookie		
Charley Hull	England	25	7	39	4	15	9–3–3	70.00
Carlota Ciganda	Spain	31	20	41	4	16	6–6–4	50.00
Céline Boutier	France	27	9	65	1	4	4–0–0	100.00
Matilda Castren	Finland	26	71	47	0	Rookie		
Nanna Koerstz Madsen	Denmark	26	4	48	0	Rookie		
Leona Maguire	Ireland	26	16	43	0	Rookie		
Mel Reid	England	33	25	53	3	12	4–6–2	41.67
Madelene Sagström	Sweden	28	10	46	1	3	1–2–0	33.33

== Day one ==
Saturday, September 4, 2021

=== Morning foursomes ===
	Results
Kang/Ernst	(Europe) 1 up	Nordqvist/Castren
Ewing/Khang	halved	Boutier/Hall
N Korda/J Korda	(Europe) 1 up	Reid/Maguire
Thompson/Altomare	(Europe) 1 up	Hull/Pedersen
0 1/2	Session	3 1/2
0 1/2	Overall	3 1/2

=== Afternoon four-ball ===
	Results
N Korda/Ewing	(United States) 1 up	Madsen/Sagström
Kupcho/Salas	(United States) 1 up	Ciganda/Popov
Thompson/Harigae	(Europe) 4 & 3	Nordqvist/Castren
Noh/Altomare	(Europe) 1 up	Hall/Maguire
2	Session	2
2 1/2	Overall	5 1/2

== Day two ==
Sunday, September 5, 2021

=== Morning foursomes ===
	Results
Kang/Ernst	(United States) 1 up	Hall/Sagström
Thompson/Altomare	(United States) 2 & 1	Hull/Pedersen
N Korda/Ewing	(Europe) 5 & 4	Reid/Maguire
Salas/Kupcho	(United States) 3 & 1	Nordqvist/Castren
3	Session	1
5 1/2	Overall	6 1/2

=== Afternoon four-ball ===
	Results
Noh/Harigae	(United States) 3 & 1	Boutier/Popov
J Korda/Khang	(Europe) 1 up	Ciganda/Madsen
Kupcho/Salas	halved	Reid/Maguire
Kang/Ernst	(Europe) 3 & 2	Hull/Pedersen
1 1/2	Session	2 1/2
7	Overall	9

== Day three ==
Monday, September 6, 2021

=== Singles ===
	Results
Lexi Thompson	halved	Anna Nordqvist
Ally Ewing	(Europe) 3 & 2	Madelene Sagström
Jennifer Kupcho	(Europe) 5 & 4	Leona Maguire
Nelly Korda	(United States) 1 up	Georgia Hall
Mina Harigae	(Europe) 5 & 4	Céline Boutier
Austin Ernst	halved	Nanna Koerstz Madsen
Lizette Salas	(Europe) 1 up	Matilda Castren
Brittany Altomare	(United States) 2 & 1	Carlota Ciganda
Megan Khang	(United States) 3 & 2	Sophia Popov
Yealimi Noh	(United States) 1 up	Mel Reid
Jessica Korda	(United States) 3 & 1	Charley Hull
Danielle Kang	(Europe) 1 up	Emily Kristine Pedersen
6	Session	6
13	Overall	15

== Individual player records ==
Each entry refers to the win–loss–half record of the player.

=== United States ===
Player	Points	Overall	Singles	Foursomes	Fourballs
Brittany Altomare	2	2–2–0	1–0–0	1–1–0	0–1–0
Austin Ernst	1.5	1–2–1	0–0–1	1–1–0	0–1–0
Ally Ewing	1.5	1–2–1	0–1–0	0–1–1	1–0–0
Mina Harigae	1	1–2–0	0–1–0	0–0–0	1–1–0
Danielle Kang	1	1–3–0	0–1–0	1–1–0	0–1–0
Megan Khang	1.5	1–1–1	1–0–0	0–0–1	0–1–0
Jessica Korda	1	1–2–0	1–0–0	0–1–0	0–1–0
Nelly Korda	2	2–2–0	1–0–0	0–2–0	1–0–0
Jennifer Kupcho	2.5	2–1–1	0–1–0	1–0–0	1–0–1
Yealimi Noh	2	2–1–0	1–0–0	0–0–0	1–1–0
Lizette Salas	2.5	2–1–1	0–1–0	1–0–0	1–0–1
Lexi Thompson	1.5	1–2–1	0–0–1	1–1–0	0–1–0

=== Europe ===
Player	Points	Overall	Singles	Foursomes	Fourballs
Céline Boutier	1.5	1–1–1	1–0–0	0–0–1	0–1–0
Matilda Castren	3	3–1–0	1–0–0	1–1–0	1–0–0
Carlota Ciganda	1	1–2–0	0–1–0	0–0–0	1–1–0
Georgia Hall	1.5	1–2–1	0–1–0	0–1–1	1–0–0
Charley Hull	2	2–2–0	0–1–0	1–1–0	1–0–0
Nanna Koerstz Madsen	1.5	1–1–1	0–0–1	0–0–0	1–1–0
Leona Maguire	4.5	4–0–1	1–0–0	2–0–0	1–0–1
Anna Nordqvist	2.5	2–1–1	0–0–1	1–1–0	1–0–0
Emily Kristine Pedersen	3	3–1–0	1–0–0	1–1–0	1–0–0
Sophia Popov	0	0–3–0	0–1–0	0–0–0	0–2–0
Mel Reid	2.5	2–1–1	0–1–0	2–0–0	0–0–1
Madelene Sagström	1	1–2–0	1–0–0	0–1–0	0–1–0
