= Isabelle Boineau =

French professional golfer

Personal information
- Nationality: France
- Born: 13 June 1989 (age 37) Marseille, France
- Height: 5 ft 6 in (168 cm)

Career
- Sport: Golf
- College: University of Arizona
- Turned professional: 2013
- Current tour: LET (2014–2021)
- Former tour: Symetra Tour (joined 2013)
- Professional wins: 2

Number of wins by tour
- Ladies European Tour: 1
- Other: 1

Best results in LPGA major championships
- Chevron Championship: DNP
- Women's PGA C'ship: DNP
- U.S. Women's Open: CUT: 2017
- Women's British Open: CUT: 2015, 2016
- Evian Championship: T48: 2016

Isabelle Boineau (born 13 June 1989) is a French professional golfer who played on the Ladies European Tour from 2014 to 2021. She won the Ladies Scottish Open and finished 5th in the LET Order of Merit in 2016.

== Amateur career ==
Boineau was born in Marseille and started to play golf in 1999 aged 10 at Allauch Golf Club. Her amateur achievements include a runner-up finish at The Spirit International Amateur Golf Championship and the Duke of York Young Champions Trophy in 2007. She was National Golf Champion in France twice, in 2003 and 2007, and French Women's International champion in 2006.

In 2006 she finished third at the European Young Masters, and she represented France at the 2006 Espirito Santo Trophy, where her team finished 4th.

Boineau earned a degree in Business Administration and Sports Management at the University of Arizona where she was part of the Arizona Wildcats women's golf team.

== Professional career ==
Boineau turned professional in 2013 and joined the Symetra Tour, where she came close to secure her maiden professional win in her first start, the Guardian Retirement Championship. Having held the lead, she eventually lost a playoff to Christine Song.

At the end of 2013 she finished T15 at the Lalla Aicha Tour School Final Qualifying, and joined the Ladies European Tour in 2014. In her rookie year her best finish was a fifth place at the Lacoste Ladies Open de France.

In 2016, Boineau won her first LET title, the Ladies Scottish Open, in tough conditions at Dundonald Links. Ranked 286 in the world at the start of the tournament, she carded a final round of 67 to finish 11 under, one shot ahead of Linda Wessberg and two clear of Becky Morgan and American Beth Allen.

In December 2016 she represented Europe at The Queens held in Japan. She finished 5th in the 2016 LET Order of Merit, which also qualified her for the 2017 U.S. Women's Open.

In March 2017 Boineau reached a world rank of 156. She won the 2017 Jabra Ladies Open at Evian Resort Golf Club, when it was a LETAS tournament, and finished T10 in 2018, when it was played as a Dual-Ranking event with the LET.

She retired from tour following the 2021 season, in which her best finish was a tie for 8th at the Tipsport Czech Ladies Open.

== Amateur wins ==
- 2006 French International Ladies Amateur Championship
- 2011 Arizona Wildcat Invitational

== Professional wins (2) ==
=== Ladies European Tour wins (1) ===
No.	Date	Tournament	Winning score	To par	Margin of victory	Runner-up
1	22 Jul 2016	Aberdeen Asset Management Ladies Scottish Open	70-67-68=205	−11	1 stroke	(Sweden) Linda Wessberg

=== LET Access Series wins (1) ===
No.	Date	Tournament	Winning score	To par	Margin of victory	Runner-up
1	3 Jun 2017	Jabra Ladies Open	67-69-70=206	−7	Playoff	(Sweden) Johanna Gustavsson

LET Access Series playoff record (1–0)

No.	Year	Tournament	Opponent	Result
1	2017	Jabra Ladies Open	(Sweden) Johanna Gustavsson	Won with birdie on first extra hole

== Playoff record ==
Symetra Tour playoff record (0–1)

No.	Year	Tournament	Opponent	Result
1	2013	Guardian Retirement Championship	(United States) Christine Song	Lost to birdie on second extra hole

== Results in LPGA majors ==
Tournament	2015	2016	2017
ANA Inspiration			
U.S. Women's Open			CUT
Women's PGA Championship			
The Evian Championship		T48	CUT
Women's British Open	CUT	CUT	

Did not play

CUT = missed the half-way cut
"T" = tied

== Team appearances ==
Amateur

- Espirito Santo Trophy (representing France): 2006
- European Young Masters (representing France): 2006
- European Ladies' Team Championship (representing France): 2008

Professional

- The Queens (representing Europe): 2016
