= The Mojo 6 =

Golf tournament formerly on the LPGA Tour

The Mojo 6 was a professional golf tournament contested by 16 amateur and professional golfers. It took place for the first time in April 2010 at the Cinnamon Hill Golf Course at Rose Hill in Montego Bay, Jamaica.

The tournament was sanctioned by the LPGA but was an unofficial event. It was not part of the regular LPGA Tour, money earned by any players who are LPGA Tour members did not count on the official LPGA money list and no statistics were recorded for LPGA statistical purposes.

Players included a selection of LPGA Tour members, an amateur sponsor's exemption and a 16th player selected by a public online vote.

== Format ==
The Mojo 6 was played using a new format called "Raceway Golf."

=== Day One ===
Each golfer played three separate six-hole matches to accumulate points and establish a ranking from 1 to 6. The players select their opponents for the first match based on their world rankings. Each hole was worth one point and each match victory was worth one bonus point for a maximum of seven points per match. Players were then re-ranked and the highest ranked player chose her opponent first, followed by the next highest-ranked player, until eight matches were created. A third set of matches was played using the same format. At the end of the day, the top eight players with the most points moved on to play on Day Two. Players chose their opponents for the first match on Day One based on their 2009 Women's World Golf Rankings position. Ranking on Day Two were based on results from Day Two.

=== Day Two ===
Day Two was also known as Championship Day. The eight remaining players competed in a tournament bracket single elimination format. The player ranked number 1 played number 8. The player ranked number 2 played number 7. Number 3 played number 6 and number 4 played number 5. The field was cut to four players after the first round and to two remaining players after the third round.

== 2010 Players ==
Player	Country	Status	2009 Rolex Ranking^{1}
Suzann Pettersen	Norway	LPGA Tour Member/Tournament Invitee	3
Cristie Kerr	United States	LPGA Tour Member/Tournament Invitee	4
Yani Tseng	Taiwan	LPGA Tour Member/Tournament Invitee	5
Anna Nordqvist	Sweden	LPGA Tour Member/Tournament Invitee	7
Angela Stanford	United States	LPGA Tour Member/Tournament Invitee	9
Na Yeon Choi	South Korea	LPGA Tour Member/Tournament Invitee	12
Song-Hee Kim	South Korea	LPGA Tour Member/Tournament Invitee	14
Sophie Gustafson	Sweden	LPGA Tour Member/Tournament Invitee	18
Kristy McPherson	United States	LPGA Tour Member/Tournament Invitee	21
Morgan Pressel	United States	LPGA Tour Member/Tournament Invitee	23
Brittany Lang	United States	LPGA Tour Member/Tournament Invitee	26
Brittany Lincicome	United States	LPGA Tour Member/Tournament Invitee	30
Christina Kim	United States	LPGA Tour Member/Tournament Invitee	49
Amanda Blumenherst	United States	LPGA Tour Member/Tournament Invitee	150
Mariah Stackhouse	United States	Amateur/Sponsor Exemption	n/a^{2}
Beatriz Recari	Spain	LPGA Tour Member/Fan Voted	175

^{1}As of December 29, 2009
^{2}Unranked amateur

== Winners ==
Year	Dates	Champion	Runner-up	Tournament Location	Purse	Winner's Share
2010	Apr 15-16	(Sweden) Anna Nordqvist	(United States) Amanda Blumenherst	Cinnamon Hill Golf Course	$1,000,000	$350,000
