= Marina Alex =

American professional golfer (born 1990)

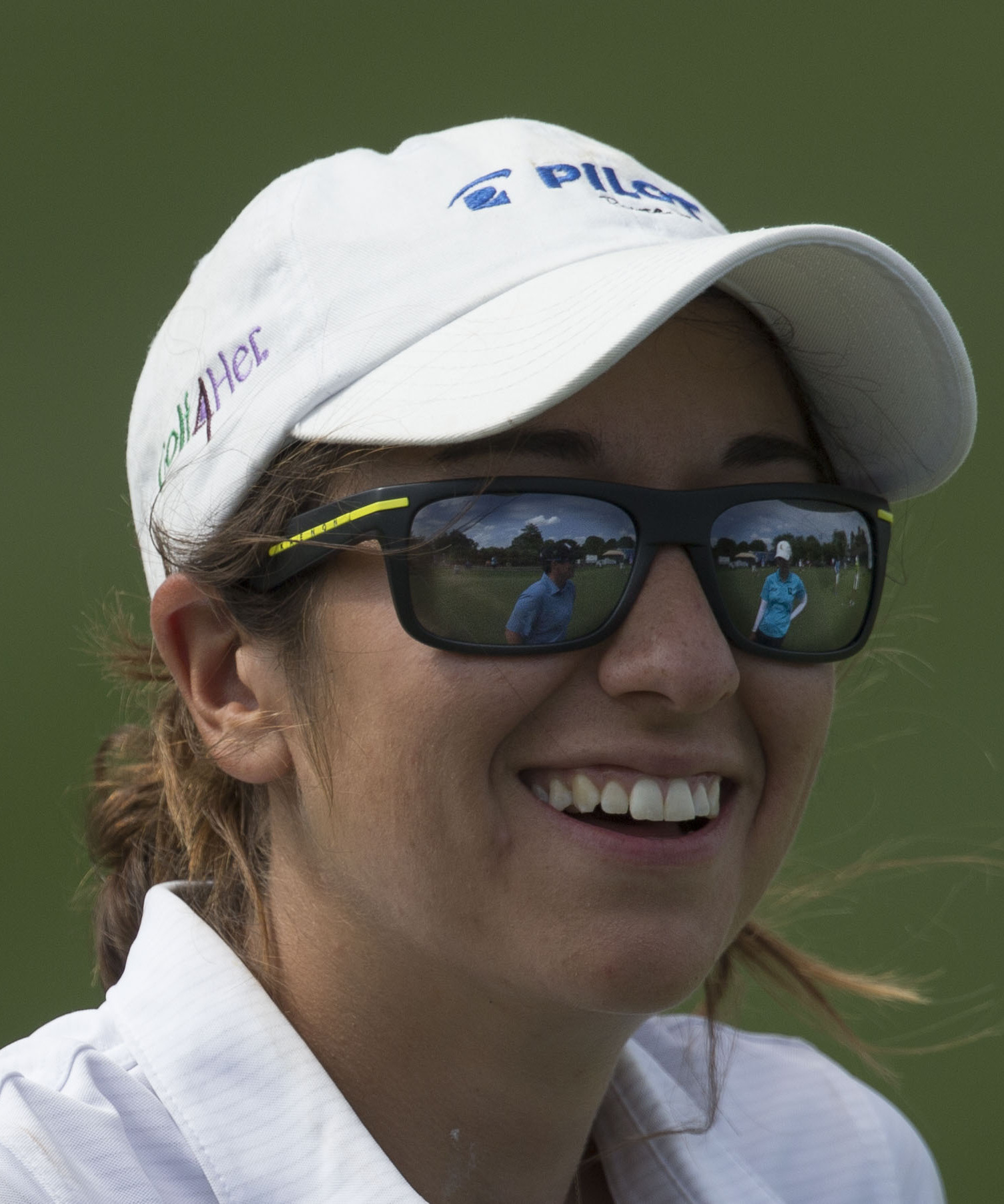
- Alex at the 2013 Kingsmill Championship

Personal information
- Nationality: United States
- Born: August 2, 1990 (age 36) Wayne, New Jersey, U.S.
- Height: 5 ft 3 in (160 cm)

Career
- Sport: Golf
- College: Vanderbilt University
- Turned professional: 2012
- Former tours: LPGA Tour; Symetra Tour
- Professional wins: 2

Number of wins by tour
- LPGA Tour: 2

Best results in LPGA major championships
- Chevron Championship: T21: 2017
- Women's PGA C'ship: T18: 2018
- U.S. Women's Open: T11: 2017
- Women's British Open: T9: 2014
- Evian Championship: 16th: 2019

Marina Dee Alex (born August 2, 1990) is an American professional golfer on the LPGA Tour.

== Early life and education ==
Raised in Wayne, New Jersey, Alex played interscholastic golf at Wayne Hills High School, where she won individual state titles in 2007 and 2008.

Alex played college golf at Vanderbilt University. She won one tournament, the 2010 SEC Championship. She qualified for the 2009 U.S. Women's Open as an amateur but missed the cut.

== Career ==
Alex turned professional in 2012 following the NCAA Championship. She played on the Symetra Tour in 2012 and 2013 with a best finish of second at the 2013 Four Winds Invitational. She finished third on the money list in 2013 to earn an LPGA Tour card for 2014.

Alex has played on the LPGA Tour since 2014 and won her first event at the 2018 Cambia Portland Classic.

She won for the second time on May 1, 2022, with a 10-under-par 274, beating the number 1 ranked Ko Jin-young by one stroke, both shooting a final round 66. Lydia Ko and Megan Khang tied for third at 276. She was ranked 61st in the world before her win, and earned 53 points for a gain of 33 rankings to 28 on May 2, 2022.

Alex retired following the 2024 season.

== Amateur wins ==
- 2010 SEC Women's Championship

== Professional wins (2) ==
=== LPGA Tour wins (2) ===
No.	Date	Tournament	Winning score	To par	Margin of victory	Runner-up	Winner's share ($)
1	Sep 2, 2018	Cambia Portland Classic	62-71-71-65=269	−19	4 strokes	(England) Georgia Hall	195,000
2	May 1, 2022	Palos Verdes Championship	70-68-70-66=274	−10	1 stroke	(South Korea) Ko Jin-young	225,000

LPGA Tour playoff record (0–1)

No.	Year	Tournament	Opponent	Result
1	2024	Toto Japan Classic	(Japan) Rio Takeda	Lost to birdie on sixth extra hole

== Results in LPGA majors ==
Results not in chronological order before 2023.

Tournament	2009	2010	2011	2012	2013	2014	2015	2016	2017	2018	2019
Chevron Championship							T51	T56	T21	T25	T71
Women's PGA Championship						CUT	T53	T26	T25	T18	T37
U.S. Women's Open	CUT						T20	CUT	T11	T27	CUT
The Evian Championship ^						T29	T38	T52	T26	58	16
Women's British Open						T9	T36	T60	T43	T28	T16

Tournament	2020	2021	2022	2023	2024
Chevron Championship	T32	CUT	T35	T28	T30
U.S. Women's Open		T26	T51	T48	
Women's PGA Championship		T33	CUT	CUT	CUT
The Evian Championship ^	NT	T35	T69	CUT	CUT
Women's British Open	T14	T55	T41	CUT	CUT

^ The Evian Championship was added as a major in 2013

Top 10
Did not play

CUT = missed the half-way cut
NT = no tournament
T = tied

=== Summary ===
Tournament	Wins	2nd	3rd	Top-5	Top-10	Top-25	Events	Cuts made
Chevron Championship	0	0	0	0	0	2	10	9
U.S. Women's Open	0	0	0	0	0	2	9	6
Women's PGA Championship	0	0	0	0	0	2	10	6
The Evian Championship	0	0	0	0	0	1	10	8
Women's British Open	0	0	0	0	1	3	11	9
Totals	0	0	0	0	1	10	50	38

- Most consecutive cuts made – 13 (2016 British – 2019 ANA)
- Longest streak of top-10s – 1 (once)

== LPGA Tour career summary ==
Year	Tournaments played	Cuts made*	Wins	2nd	3rd	Top 10s	Best finish	Earnings ($)	Money list rank	Scoring average	Scoring rank
2012	1	1	0	0	0	0	T40	n/a	n/a	71.67	n/a
2013	3	0	0	0	0	0	CUT	n/a	n/a	73.33	n/a
2014	25	15	0	0	0	1	T9	224,330	65	72.06	59
2015	24	15	0	0	0	1	T9	182,967	71	73.07	110
2016	26	19	0	0	0	3	T6	282,972	65	71.63	50
2017	25	21	0	0	1	6	T3	699,895	27	70.29	19
2018	24	20	1	T2	T3	6	1	901,322	17	70.54	19
2019	24	21	0	0	1	5	3	609,290	37	70.67	23
2020	7	6	0	0	0	2	T4	225,882	52	70.96	14
2021	20	15	0	0	0	1	T7	295,606	64	71.36	69
2022	23	20	1	0	0	5	1	665,878	44	70.82	40
2023	21	13	0	0	0	0	T12	226,360	95	71.94	97
2024	25	16	0	1	0	5	2	719,855	57	71.18	47
Totals^	247	181	2	2	2	35	1	5,034,357	92		

^ Official as of 2024 season
* Includes matchplay and other tournaments without a cut.

== World ranking ==
Position in Women's World Golf Rankings at the end of each calendar year.

Year	Ranking	Source
2012	476	
2013	428	
2014	149	
2015	150	
2016	113	
2017	47	
2018	26	
2019	33	
2020	42	
2021	61	
2022	40	
2023	122	
2024	81	

== Team appearances ==
Professional

- Solheim Cup (representing the United States): 2019

=== Solheim Cup record ===
Year	Total matches	Total W–L–H	Singles W–L–H	Foursomes W–L–H	Fourballs W–L–H	Points won	Points %
Career	4	1–1–2	0–1–0	1–0–1	0–0–1	2	50.0
2019	4	1–1–2	0–1–0 lost to S. Pettersen 1 dn	1–0–1 halved w/ M. Pressel won w/ M. Pressel 2&1	0–0–1 halved w/ L. Thompson	2	50.0
