= Lizette Salas =

American professional golfer (born 1989)

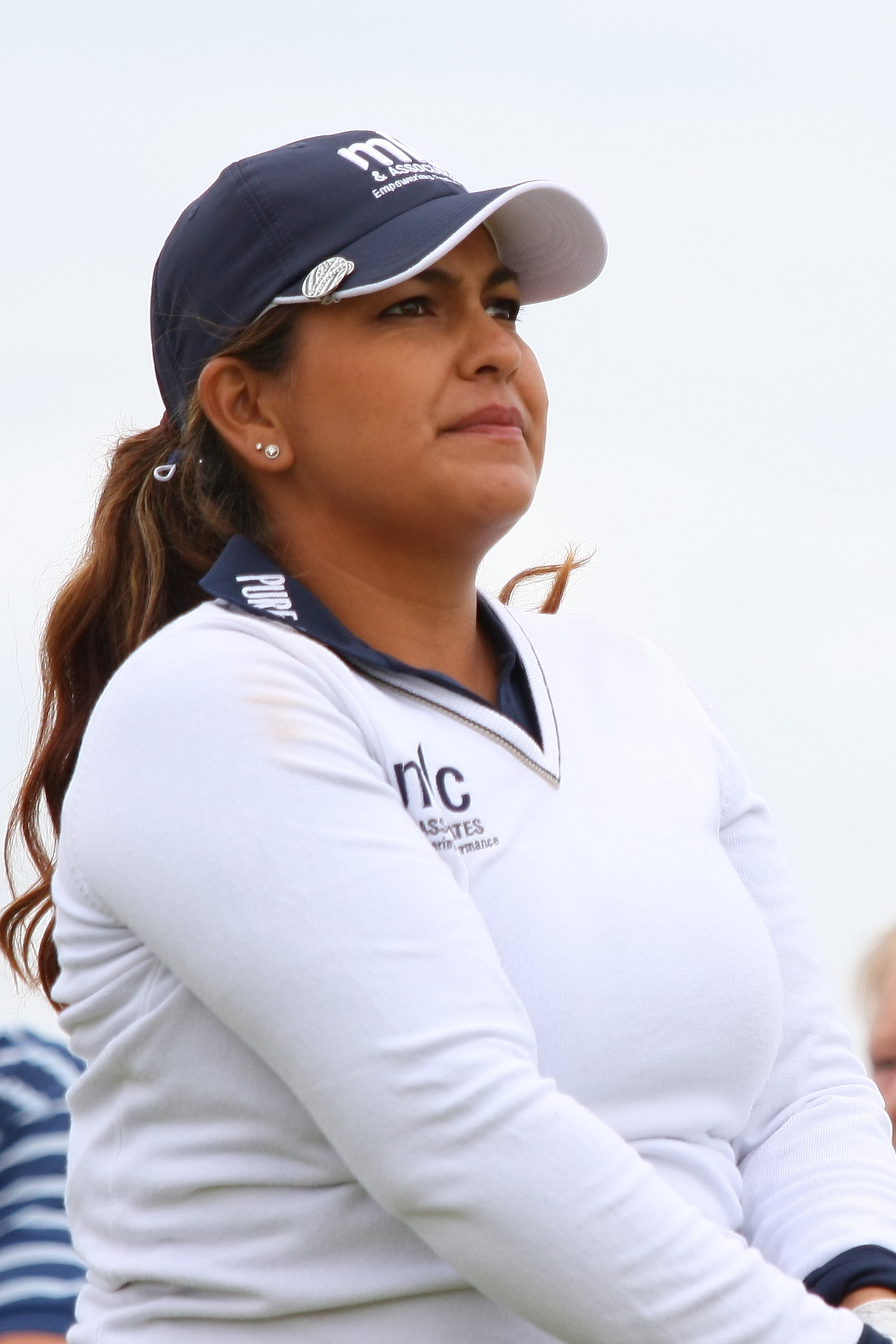
- Salas at the 2013 Women's British Open

Personal information
- Full name: Lizette Salas
- Nationality: United States
- Born: July 17, 1989 (age 37) Azusa, California, U.S.
- Height: 5 ft 4 in (1.63 m)

Career
- Sport: Golf
- College: University of Southern California
- Turned professional: 2011
- Current tour: LPGA Tour (joined 2012)
- Former tour: Symetra Tour (2011)
- Professional wins: 2

Number of wins by tour
- LPGA Tour: 2

Best results in LPGA major championships
- Chevron Championship: T17: 2019
- Women's PGA C'ship: 2nd: 2021
- U.S. Women's Open: T14: 2015
- Women's British Open: 2nd/T2: 2019, 2021
- Evian Championship: T11: 2013

Lizette Salas (born July 17, 1989) is an American professional golfer currently playing on the LPGA Tour.

== Early life and amateur career ==
In 1989, Salas was born in Azusa, California. She was raised in the town. In 2007, Salas graduated from Azusa High School.

Salas earned a scholarship to play college golf at the University of Southern California where she graduated in 2011 with a degree in sociology, becoming the first member of her immediate family to earn a college degree.

During her time at University of Southern California she had three collegiate wins, was named the 2008 Pac-10 Freshman of the Year, was Pac-10 Player of the Year in 2009 and 2010, and Pac-10 All-Conference First Team selection in 2009, 2010, and 2011. She also was an NGCA All-American First Team selection in 2009 and 2011. Salas is the only USC student-athlete to be recognized as an All-American all four years. In July 2010 she made her first appearance in a professional tournament after qualifying for the U.S. Women's Open. She shot 79-77 at the tournament and missed the cut.

== Professional career ==
In 2011, Salas turned professional after graduating from the University of Southern California. She competed on the Symetra Tour in 2011, competing in seven tournaments and finishing 45th on the Symetra Tour money list. Also in 2011, she made her first appearance at the U.S. Women's Open as a professional and finished T15. Salas participated in the 2011 LPGA Qualifying School in the fall of 2011, finishing 20th and earning full status on the LPGA Tour for 2012. Salas won her first championship on the LPGA Tour at the 2014 Kingsmill Championship winning by a four-stroke margin.

In 2015, Salas exceeded the $2 million mark in career earnings when she tied for second at the Meijer LPGA Classic. That year she competed for the second time on the U.S. Solheim Cup team. On the tour, she finished sixth on in driving accuracy and 10th in putting average. In 2017, Salas recorded eight top-10 finishes, including a string of four top-five finishes. Her season-best was a T-3 finish at the Swinging Skirts LPGA Taiwan Championship. She competed for the third time on the U.S. Solheim Cup team. In 2018, she recorded four top-10 finishes, including runner-up finishes at the Kia Classic and the Indy Women in Tech Championship. In 2019, she placed second in the Women's British Open.

== Awards and honors ==
- In 2008, after her first year at UCLA, Salas earned Pac-10 Freshman of the Year honors.
- In 2009 and 2010, after her sophomore and junior years, she earned Pac-10 Player of the Year honors.
- She was Pac-10 All-Conference First Team three times: in 2009, 2010, and 2011.
- Salas also was an NGCA All-American First Team selection in 2009 and 2011.

== Professional wins (2) ==
=== LPGA Tour wins (2) ===
No.	Date	Tournament	Winning score	To par	Margin of victory	Runners-up
1	May 18, 2014	Kingsmill Championship	67-68-65-71=271	−13	4 strokes	(Australia) Sarah Jane Smith (United States) Lexi Thompson (Taiwan) Yani Tseng
2	Jul 16, 2022	Dow Great Lakes Bay Invitational (with (United States) Jennifer Kupcho)	68-61-64-61=254	−26	5 strokes	(Finland) Matilda Castren and (Malaysia) Kelly Tan

LPGA Tour playoff record (0–2)

No.	Year	Tournament	Opponent	Result
1	2013	LPGA Lotte Championship	(Norway) Suzann Pettersen	Lost to par on first extra hole
2	2018	Indy Women in Tech Championship	(South Korea) Park Sung-hyun	Lost to birdie on first extra hole

== Results in LPGA majors ==
Results not in chronological order.

Tournament	2010	2011	2012	2013	2014	2015	2016	2017	2018	2019
Chevron Championship			T46	T25	CUT	CUT	T26	T35	T66	T17
Women's PGA Championship			T25	CUT	T37	T19	T30	T11	T8	T5
U.S. Women's Open	CUT	T15	T32	T20	WD	T14	T26	T15	T17	T26
The Evian Championship ^				T11	T16	T70	CUT		T26	T13
Women's British Open				6		43	T25	T14	T47	2

Tournament	2020	2021	2022	2023	2024	2025	2026
The Chevron Championship	T24	CUT	T39	CUT	CUT		
U.S. Women's Open	T46	T23	T34	T20			
Women's PGA Championship	CUT	2	CUT	CUT	T66		CUT
The Evian Championship ^	NT	T25	T43				
Women's British Open	T19	T2	T54				

^ The Evian Championship was added as a major in 2013.

Top 10
Did not play

CUT = missed the half-way cut
WD = withdrew
NT = no tournament
T = tied

=== Summary ===
Tournament	Wins	2nd	3rd	Top-5	Top-10	Top-25	Events	Cuts made
Chevron Championship	0	0	0	0	0	3	13	8
U.S. Women's Open	0	0	0	0	0	7	14	12
Women's PGA Championship	0	1	0	2	3	6	14	9
The Evian Championship	0	0	0	0	0	4	8	7
Women's British Open	0	2	0	2	3	6	9	9
Totals	0	3	0	4	6	26	58	45

- Most consecutive cuts made – 16 (2017 ANA – 2020 ANA)
- Longest streak of top-10s – 1 (six times)

== LPGA Tour career summary ==
Year	Tournaments played	Cuts made*	Wins	2nds	3rds	Top 10s	Best finish	Earnings (US$)	Money list rank	Scoring average	Scoring rank
2010	1	0	0	0	0	0	MC	n/a	n/a	78.00	n/a
2011	1	1	0	0	0	0	T15	248,658^{1}	n/a	72.50	n/a
2012	18	16	0	0	0	1	T9	242,035	51	71.72	31
2013	24	23	0	1	1	7	2	759,323	15	70.71	12
2014	24	20	1	1	1	4	1	669,106	24	71.45	29
2015	24	22	0	1	0	2	T2	531,096	31	71.36	25
2016	24	20	0	0	0	0	12	333,013	58	71.31	36
2017	27	23	0	0	1	8	T3	878,283	21	70.13	14
2018	24	22	0	2	0	4	2	822,064	23	70.60	21
2019	24	21	0	1	1	3	2	1,038,152	13	70.70	26
2020	13	11	0	0	0	1	T10	192,024	62	71.76	52
2021	21	16	0	2	0	4	2	1,161,594	11	70.64	31
2022	23	17	1	0	0	4	1	762,032	39	70.75	37
2023	12	8	0	0	0	0	T13	207,885	98	72.18	108
2024	10	6	0	0	0	0	T30	88,352	140	71.83	n/a
Totals^	270	226	2	8	4	38	1	7,684,959	44		

^ Official as of 2024 season
* Includes matchplay and other events without a cut.
^{1} Earnings prior to 2012 are unofficial because Salas was not an LPGA member.

== World ranking ==
Position in Women's World Golf Rankings at the end of each calendar year.

Year	Ranking	Source
2011	353	
2012	89	
2013	20	
2014	25	
2015	39	
2016	67	
2017	33	
2018	27	
2019	19	
2020	33	
2021	20	
2022	50	
2023	113	
2024	342	

== U.S. national team appearances ==
Professional

- Solheim Cup: 2013, 2015 (winners), 2017 (winners), 2019, 2021

=== Solheim Cup record ===
Year	Total matches	Total W–L–H	Singles W–L–H	Foursomes W–L–H	Fourballs W–L–H	Points won	Points %
Career	18	8–7–3	3–1–1	2–3–1	3–3–1	9.5	52.8
2013	3	0–1–2	0–0–1 halved w/ S. Pettersen	0–1–1 lost w/ S. Lewis 4&2 halved w/ B. Lincicome	0–0–0	1.0	33.3
2015	3	1–2–0	1–0–0 def. A. Muñoz 3&1	0–1–0 lost w/ S. Lewis 3&2	0–1–0 lost w/ B. Lang 2&1	1.0	33.3
2017	4	3–1–0	1–0–0 def. J. Ewart Shadoff 1 up	1–0–0 won w/ D. Kang 1 up	1–1–0 won w/ A. Yin 6&5 lost w/ A. Yin 4&2	3.0	75.0
2019	4	2–2–0	1–0–0 def. A. van Dam 1 up	0–1–0 lost w/ A. McDonald 3&2	1–1–0 lost w/ D. Kang 4&2 won w/ D. Kang 2&1	2.0	50.0
2021	4	2–1–1	0–1–0 lost to M. Castren 1 dn	1–0–0 won w/ J. Kupcho 3&1	1–0–1 won w/ J. Kupcho 1 up halved w/ J. Kupcho	2.5	62.5
