= 2017 LPGA Tour =

Golf tour season

2017 LPGA Tour season
- Duration: January 26, 2017 – November 19, 2017
- Number of official events: 35
- Most wins: 3 (China) Shanshan Feng, (South Korea) Kim In-Kyung
- Race to CME Globe Winner: (United States) Lexi Thompson
- Money leader: (South Korea) Park Sung-hyun
- Vare Trophy: (United States) Lexi Thompson
- Rolex Player of the Year: (South Korea) Park Sung-hyun and Ryu So-yeon
- Rookie of the Year: (South Korea) Park Sung-hyun

The 2017 LPGA Tour was a series of professional golf tournaments for elite female golfers from around the world. The season began in the Bahamas on January 26 and ended on November 19 at the Tiburón Golf Club in Naples, Florida. The tournaments are sanctioned by the United States–based Ladies Professional Golf Association (LPGA).

== Schedule and results ==
The number in parentheses after each winners' name is the player's total number of wins in official money individual events on the LPGA Tour, including that event. Tournament and winner names in bold indicate LPGA majors.

Date	Tournament	Location	Winner	WWGR points	Purse ($)	Winner's share ($)
Jan 29	Pure Silk-Bahamas LPGA Classic	Bahamas	(United States) Brittany Lincicome (7)	28	1,400,000	210,000
Feb 19	ISPS Handa Women's Australian Open	Australia	(South Korea) Jang Ha-na (4)	34	1,300,000	195,000
Feb 26	Honda LPGA Thailand	Thailand	(South Korea) Amy Yang (3)	62	1,600,000	240,000
Mar 5	HSBC Women's Champions	Singapore	(South Korea) Inbee Park (18)	62	1,500,000	225,000
Mar 19	Bank of Hope Founders Cup	Arizona	(Sweden) Anna Nordqvist (7)	62	1,500,000	225,000
Mar 26	Kia Classic	California	(South Korea) Mirim Lee (3)	68	1,800,000	270,000
Apr 2	**ANA Inspiration**	California	(South Korea) **Ryu So-yeon** (4)	100	2,700,000	405,000
Apr 15	Lotte Championship	Hawaii	(United States) Cristie Kerr (19)	53	2,000,000	300,000
Apr 30	Volunteers of America Texas Shootout	Texas	(Japan) Haru Nomura (3)	68	1,300,000	195,000
May 7	Citibanamex Lorena Ochoa Match Play	Mexico	(South Korea) Kim Sei-young (6)	43	1,200,000	250,000
May 21	Kingsmill Championship	Virginia	(United States) Lexi Thompson (8)	62	1,300,000	195,000
May 28	LPGA Volvik Championship	Michigan	(China) Shanshan Feng (7)	50	1,300,000	195,000
Jun 4	ShopRite LPGA Classic	New Jersey	(South Korea) In-Kyung Kim (5)	37	1,500,000	225,000
Jun 11	Manulife LPGA Classic	Ontario	(Thailand) Ariya Jutanugarn (6)	31	1,700,000	255,000
Jun 18	Meijer LPGA Classic	Michigan	(Canada) Brooke Henderson (4)	46	2,000,000	300,000
Jun 25	Walmart NW Arkansas Championship	Arkansas	(South Korea) Ryu So-yeon (5)	43	2,000,000	300,000
Jul 2	**KPMG Women's PGA Championship**	Illinois	(United States) **Danielle Kang** (1)	100	3,500,000	525,000
Jul 9	Thornberry Creek LPGA Classic	Wisconsin	(Australia) Katherine Kirk (3)	26	2,000,000	300,000
Jul 16	**U.S. Women's Open**	New Jersey	(South Korea) **Park Sung-hyun** (1)	100	5,000,000	900,000
Jul 23	Marathon Classic	Ohio	(South Korea) In-Kyung Kim (6)	28	1,600,000	240,000
Jul 30	Aberdeen Asset Management Ladies Scottish Open	Scotland	(South Korea) Lee Mi-hyang (2)	43	1,500,000	225,000
Aug 6	**Ricoh Women's British Open**	Scotland	(South Korea) **In-Kyung Kim** (7)	100	3,250,000	504,821
Aug 20	Solheim Cup	Iowa	United States	n/a		
Aug 27	Canadian Pacific Women's Open	Ontario	(South Korea) Park Sung-hyun (2)	56	2,250,000	337,500
Sep 3	Cambia Portland Classic	Oregon	(United States) Stacy Lewis (12)	31	1,300,000	195,000
Sep 9 (Note: This tournament was originally scheduled to be a 72-hole event that would conclude on September 10, 2017; however, it was decided that the tournament would be shortened to 54 holes, and given a Saturday finish, in order to accommodate players who wished to play both in this tournament, and the Evian Championship in France the following week.)	Indy Women in Tech Championship	Indiana	(United States) Lexi Thompson (9)	31	2,000,000	300,000
Sep 17	**Evian Championship**	France	(Sweden) **Anna Nordqvist** (8)	100	3,650,000	547,500
Oct 1	McKayson New Zealand Women's Open	New Zealand	(Canada) Brooke Henderson (5)	19	1,300,000	195,000
Oct 8	Alisports LPGA	China	Tournament canceled	–	2,100,000	315,000
Oct 15	LPGA KEB Hana Bank Championship	South Korea	(South Korea) Ko Jin-young (1)	62	2,000,000	300,000
Oct 22	Swinging Skirts LPGA Taiwan Championship	Taiwan	(South Korea) Ji Eun-hee (3)	43	2,200,000	330,000
Oct 29	Sime Darby LPGA Malaysia	Malaysia	(United States) Cristie Kerr (20)	53	1,800,000	270,000
Nov 5	Toto Japan Classic	Japan	(China) Shanshan Feng (8)	53	1,500,000	225,000
Nov 11	Blue Bay LPGA	China	(China) Shanshan Feng (9)	28	2,100,000	315,000
Nov 19	CME Group Tour Championship	Florida	(Thailand) Ariya Jutanugarn (7)	62	2,500,000	500,000

== Season leaders ==
Money list leaders

Rank	Player	Country	Events	Prize money($)
1	Park Sung-hyun	South Korea	23	2,335,883
2	Ryu So-yeon	South Korea	23	1,981,593
3	Lexi Thompson	United States	21	1,877,181
4	Shanshan Feng	China	22	1,728,191
5	Ariya Jutanugarn	Thailand	27	1,549,858
6	Brooke Henderson	Canada	30	1,504,869
7	Cristie Kerr	United States	23	1,414,752
8	Anna Nordqvist	Sweden	20	1,335,164
9	Moriya Jutanugarn	Thailand	28	1,320,900
10	Kim Sei-young	South Korea	25	1,278,166

Full 2017 official money list

Scoring average leaders

Rank	Player	Country	Average
1	Lexi Thompson	United States	69.114
2	Park Sung-hyun	South Korea	69.247
3	Chun In-gee	South Korea	69.415
4	Stacy Lewis	United States	69.609
5	Inbee Park	South Korea	69.673

Full 2017 scoring average list

== Awards ==
Award	Winner	Country
Money winner	Park Sung-hyun	South Korea
Scoring leader (Vare Trophy)	Lexi Thompson	United States
Player of the Year	Park Sung-hyun; Ryu So-yeon	South Korea; South Korea
Rookie of the Year	Park Sung-hyun	South Korea
Race to the CME Globe	Lexi Thompson	United States

== See also ==
- 2017 Ladies European Tour
- 2017 Symetra Tour
