= Central Florida Championship =

Golf tournament in Florida

Tournament information
- Location: Lakeland, Florida
- Established: 2009
- Courses: Grasslands Golf & Country Club
- Par: 72
- Length: 6,528 yards (5,969 m)
- Tour: Epson Tour
- Format: Stroke play
- Prize fund: $250,000
- Month played: March

Current champion
- (United States) Maddie McCrary

The Central Florida Championship is an annual golf tournament for professional women golfers on the Epson Tour, the LPGA's developmental tour. The event has been played in Central Florida since 2009. Before moving to the Grasslands Golf & Country Club in 2026, the event was played at the Country Club of Winter Haven in Winter Haven, Florida since 2017. From 2014 to 2016, it was played at Lake Wales Country Club in Lake Wales, Florida since 2014. From 2009 to 2013, it was played at the Lake Region Yacht and Country Club in Winter Haven.

The tournament is a 54-hole event, as are most tour tournaments, and includes pre-tournament pro-am opportunities, in which local amateur golfers can play with the professional golfers from the tour as a benefit for local charities, such as the Florida's Natural Growers Foundation.

Tournament venue through the years:

- 2009–2013: Lake Region Yacht and Country Club
- 2014–2016: Lake Wales Country Club
- 2017–2025: Country Club of Winter Haven
- 2026: Grasslands Golf & Country Club

Tournament name through the years:

- 2009: Florida's Natural Growers Charity Classic
- 2010–2024: Florida's Natural Charity Classic
- 2025: Central Florida Championship
- 2026: Orlando Health Championship

== Winners ==
Year	Date	Champion	Country	Score	Margin of victory	Runner(s)-up	Purse ($)	Winner's share ($)
2026	Mar 22	Maddie McCrary	United States	204 (−12)	1 stroke	(United States) Mariel Galdiano	250,000	37,500
2025	Mar 2	Riley Smyth	United States	201 (−15)	Playoff	(Finland) Matilda Castren	250,000	37,500
2024	Mar 10	Valery Plata	Colombia	206 (−10)	Playoff	(Slovenia) Ana Belac	250,000	37,500
2023	Mar 5	Agathe Laisné	France	207 (−9)	Playoff	(United States) Jillian Hollis (Finland) Kiira Riihijärvi	200,000	30,000
2022	Mar 6	Park Kum-Kang	South Korea	207 (−9)	2 strokes	(Sweden) Frida Kinhult (United States) Alana Uriell	200,000	30,000
2021	No tournament							
2020	Mar 8	Janie Jackson	United States	206 (−10)	8 strokes	(United States) Daniela Iacobelli	125,000	18,750
2019	Mar 17	Kelly Tan	Malaysia	203 (−13)	Playoff (Note: Tan won with a birdie on the first hole of a sudden-death playoff over Runas.)	(United States) Demi Runas	125,000	18,750
2018	Mar 18	Lauren Kim	United States	206 (−10)	1 stroke	(United States) Daniela Iacobelli	125,000	18,750
2017	Mar 12	Olivia Jordan-Higgins	Jersey	206 (−10)	1 stroke	(United States) Christine Song (China) Yu Liu	125,000	18,750
2016	Apr 10	Samantha Richdale	Canada	209 (−7)	1 stroke	(Sweden) Madelene Sagström (Chinese Taipei) Ya-Chun Chang	175,000	26,250
2015	Mar 29	Sue Kim	Canada	211 (−5)	3 strokes	(Canada) Brittany Henderson (Canada) Brooke Henderson (a)	125,000	18,750
2014	Mar 23	Yueer Cindy Feng	China	207 (−9)	4 strokes	(United States) Megan McChrystal (United States) Jackie Stoelting (Canada) Maude-Aimée LeBlanc	125,000	18,750
2013	Mar 24	Melissa Eaton	United States	206 (−10)	3 strokes	(Australia) Courtney Massey (Canada) Sue Kim (United States) Amelia Lewis	125,000	18,750
2012	Mar 25	Megan McChrystal	United States	206 (−10)	1 stroke	(Canada) Sara-Maude Juneau (United States) Nicole Smith	125,000	18,750
2011	Mar 27	Tzu-Chi Lin	Taiwan	211 (−5)	1 stroke	(United States) Jackie Barenborg	110,000	15,400
2010	Mar 21	Angela Oh	United States	137 (−7) (Note: Tournament shortened to 36 holes due rain.)	Playoff (Note: Oh won on the first hole of a sudden-death playoff over Rah.)	(United States) Jane Rah	100,000	14,000
2009	Mar 22	Jean Reynolds	United States	212 (−4)	Playoff (Note: Reynolds won on the third hole of a sudden-death playoff over Song.)	(South Korea) Song Yi Choi	100,000	14,000

== Tournament records ==
Year	Player	Score	Round	Course
2009	Song Yi Choi	64 (−8)	1st	Lake Region Yacht and Country Club
2014	Emma de Groot	66 (−6)	2nd	Lake Wales Country Club
2016	Marissa Steen	66 (−6)	1st	Lake Wales Country Club
2016	Luciane Lee	66 (−6)	3rd	Lake Wales Country Club
2017	Kim Welch	65 (−7)	3rd	Country Club of Winter Haven
2019	Maude-Aimee Leblanc	65 (−7)	1st	Country Club of Winter Haven
2019	Vicky Hurst	65 (−7)	3rd	Country Club of Winter Haven
2023	Becca Huffer	65 (−7)	3rd	Country Club of Winter Haven
2023	Liu Yan	65 (−7)	3rd	Country Club of Winter Haven
2025	Savannah Carlson	65 (−7)	1st	Country Club of Winter Haven
2025	Isabella Fierro	65 (−7)	2nd	Country Club of Winter Haven
2025	Juliana Hung	65 (−7)	2nd	Country Club of Winter Haven
2025	Laura Wearn	65 (−7)	2nd	Country Club of Winter Haven
