= Lisa Ferrero =

American professional golfer

Personal information
- Nationality: United States
- Born: November 3, 1982 (age 43) Stockton, California, U.S.

Career
- Sport: Golf
- College: University of Texas
- Turned professional: 2005
- Former tours: LPGA Tour (joined 2007, 2010–present); Futures Tour (joined 2005)
- Professional wins: 2

Number of wins by tour
- Epson Tour: 2

Best results in LPGA major championships
- Chevron Championship: CUT: 2001
- Women's PGA C'ship: T49: 2013
- U.S. Women's Open: 72nd: 2009
- Women's British Open: DNP
- Evian Championship: DNP

Achievements and awards
- Heather Farr Player Award: 2014

Lisa Ferrero (born November 3, 1982) is an American professional golfer who played on the LPGA Tour and Futures Tour.

== Early life and amateur career ==
In 1982, Ferrero was born in Stockton, California. Ferrero won the U.S. Girls' Junior in 2000.

Ferrero played college golf at University of Texas at Austin. She graduated with a bachelor's degree in Sports Management.

== Professional career ==
In 2005, Ferrero turned professional. She joined the Futures Tour on January 28, 2005. Ferrero joined the LPGA Tour in 2007 as a rookie.

On August 23, 2017, Ferrero was named Towson University women's golf head coach.

== Personal life ==
Ferrero lives in Lodi, California.

== Amateur wins ==
- 2000 U.S. Girls' Junior

== Professional wins (2) ==
=== Futures Tour wins (2) ===
No.	Date	Tournament	Winning score	Margin of victory	Runner-up
1	May 1, 2011	Symetra Classic	−6 (73-66-71=210)	2 strokes	(United States) Jenny Gleason
2	Jun 12, 2011	Teva Championship	−6 (66-70-71=207)	1 stroke	(United States) Kathleen Ekey
