= Tullymore Classic =

Golf tournament in Michigan

Tournament information
- Location: Stanwood, Michigan
- Established: 2015
- Course(s): Tullymore Golf Resort
- Par: 72
- Length: 6,418 yards (5,869 m)
- Tour(s): Symetra Tour
- Format: Stroke play
- Prize fund: $100,000
- Month played: July
- Final year: 2017

Final champion
- (China) Yu Liu

The Tullymore Classic was a tournament on the Symetra Tour, the LPGA's developmental tour. It was part of the Symetra Tour's schedule between 2015 and 2017. It was held at Tullymore Golf Resort in Stanwood, Michigan.

== Winners ==
| Year | Date | Winner | Country | Score | Margin of victory | Runners-up | Purse ($) | Winner's share ($) | Ref |
|---|---|---|---|---|---|---|---|---|---|
| 2017 | Jul 2 | Yu Liu | China | 200 (−16) | 1 stroke | (Germany) Sophia Popov (United States) Lindsey Weaver (United States) Jessica Welch | 100,000 | 15,000 | |
| 2016 | Jul 3 | Paola Moreno | Colombia | 204 (−12) | 2 strokes | (United States) Erynne Lee (United States) Megan McChrystal | 100,000 | 15,000 | |
| 2015 | Jul 5 | Daniela Iacobelli | United States | 200 (−16) | 1 stroke | (Japan) Chie Arimura (United States) Lee Lopez (China) Haruka Morita-Wanyaolu (a) | 100,000 | 15,000 | |
