= Cindy LaCrosse =

American professional golfer (born 1987)

Personal information
- Nationality: United States
- Born: 21 April 1987 (age 39) Tampa, Florida, U.S.
- Height: 5 ft 7 in (1.70 m)

Career
- Sport: Golf
- College: University of Louisville (graduated 2009)
- Turned professional: 2009
- Former tours: LPGA Tour (joined 2011); Futures Tour (joined 2009)
- Professional wins: 3

Number of wins by tour
- Epson Tour: 3

Best results in LPGA major championships
- Chevron Championship: T26: 2012
- Women's PGA C'ship: T14: 2011
- U.S. Women's Open: T14: 2012
- Women's British Open: T13: 2012
- Evian Championship: T15: 2013

Achievements and awards
- Futures Tour Player of the Year: 2010

Cindy LaCrosse (born April 21, 1987) is an American professional golfer who playined on the LPGA Tour and the Futures Tour.

== Early life and amateur career ==
LaCrosse was born in Tampa, Florida on April 21, 1987, to Doug and Pam LaCrosse. Her father played college golf at the University of South Florida, and is a professional golfer. She resides in Tampa, Florida.

LaCrosse played college golf at the University of Louisville and earned a bachelor's degree in sports administration.

== Professional career ==
In 2009, LaCrosse turned professional. She joined the Futures Tour on January 21, 2009. LaCrosse played in the final pairing in the 2011 LPGA Championship and finished tied for 14th.

== Professional wins (3) ==
=== Futures Tour wins (3) ===
No.	Date	Tournament	Winning score	To par	Margin of victory	Runner-up	Winner's share ($)
1	Mar 28, 2010	Riviera Nayarit Challenge	70-71=68=209	−10	1 stroke	(United States) Jennie Lee	21,000
2	Aug 1, 2010	Alliance Bank Golf Classic	67-66-68=201	−12	3 strokes	(United States) Amelia Lewis	14,000
3	Sep 5, 2010	Price Chopper Tour Championship	69-70-69=208	−5	Playoff	(United States) / (South Korea) Jennifer Song	16,800

== Futures Tour career summary ==
Year	Tournaments played	Cuts made	Wins	2nd	3rd	Top 10s	Best finish	Earnings ($)	Money list rank	Scoring average	Scoring rank
2009	11	9	0	0	0	10	T4	17,695	31	71.13	3
2010	15	15	3	1	1	11	1	94,578	1	69.51	2
2011	1	1	0	0	0	1	T8	2,459		72.00	

== LPGA Tour career summary ==
Year	Tournaments played	Cuts made	Wins	2nd	3rd	Top 10s	Best finish	Earnings ($)	Money list rank	Scoring average	Scoring rank
2009	1	1	0	0	0	0	T61	8,365	n/a	75.00	n/a
2010	6	4	0	0	0	0	T29	20,516	n/a	73.17	n/a
2011	16	10	0	0	0	0	T11	114,800	65	72.85	56
2012	21	16	0	0	0	0	T13	222,230	54	72.90	67
2013	24	14	0	0	0	0	T15	121,693	79	73.64	122
2014	16	4	0	0	0	0	T58	12,407	152	75.50	155
2015	1	0	0	0	0	0	MC	0	n/a	73.50	n/a
2016	3	1	0	0	0	0	T64	3,430	171	73.63	n/a
2017	8	4	0	0	0	0	T36	18,257	158	71.65	n/a
2018	19	8	0	0	0	0	T18	70,740	114	72.65	127
2019	6	1	0	0	0	0	T58	4,414	174	73.45	n/a
2020	Did not play										
2021	3	2	0	0	0	0	T32	13,461	163	72.44	n/a
2022	2	1	0	0	0	0	T69	3,062	199	73.50	n/a
2023	2	0	0	0	0	0	MC	0	n/a	74.25	n/a

- official through the 2023 season
