= Yu Liu (golfer) =

Chinese professional golfer (born 1995)

Personal information
- Nationality: China
- Born: 15 November 1995 (age 30) Beijing, China
- Height: 5 ft 9 in (175 cm)

Career
- Sport: Golf
- College: Duke University
- Turned professional: 2014
- Current tour: LPGA Tour (joined 2018)
- Former tour: Symetra Tour (joined 2015)
- Professional wins: 2

Number of wins by tour
- Epson Tour: 1
- Other: 1

Best results in LPGA major championships
- Chevron Championship: T19: 2021
- Women's PGA C'ship: T25: 2021
- U.S. Women's Open: T5: 2019
- Women's British Open: T7: 2018
- Evian Championship: T30: 2019

Achievements and awards
- ACC Rookie of the Year: 2014
Medal record
Women's golf
Representing China
Asian Games
Bronze medal – third place	2022 Hangzhou	Team

Yu Liu (born 15 November 1995) is a Chinese professional golfer and member of the LPGA Tour.

== Amateur career ==
Liu was born in Beijing and had a successful junior career where she won several tournaments in the U.S. and China. She reached the semifinals of the U.S. Girls' Junior Championship in 2011, won by Ariya Jutanugarn.

Liu attended Duke University and played golf with the Duke Blue Devils women's golf team for the 2013–14 season, where she was named Atlantic Coast Conference Rookie of the Year.

Liu secured her first victory in a professional tournament at the 2013 Srixon XXIO Ladies Open on the China LPGA Tour.

== Professional career ==
Liu turned professional in 2014 and joined the Symetra Tour in 2015. In 2017, she was runner-up at the Florida's Natural Charity Classic, Guardian Championship and Symetra Tour Championship. She won the Tullymore Classic to become the third player from China to ever win on the Symetra Tour, joining Yueer Cindy Feng (2014) and Hong Mei Yang (2004). She finished fifth on the money list to earn LPGA Tour membership for 2018.

In her rookie LPGA Tour season, she made 21 cuts in 27 events, to finish 49th on the money list and third in the Rookie of the Year standings. She had three top-10 finishes including a tie for 7th at the 2018 Women's British Open.

In 2019, she finished tied 5th at the 2019 U.S. Women's Open, and was runner-up at the Bank of Hope Founders Cup. She finished 20th on the money list and reached a high of 31st in the Women's World Golf Rankings.

By 2021, she had pocketed almost $2 million in career earnings.

== Amateur wins ==
- 2009 CITIC Bank China Amateur Tour Final
- 2010 CITIC Bank China Amateur Tour Final, Tee Up Junior Challenge, Killington Junior Golf Championship
- 2011 Under Armour/Vicky Hurst Championship
- 2012 Chongqing Challenge
- 2014 Darius Rucker Intercollegiate

== Professional wins (2) ==
=== Symetra Tour wins (1) ===
No.	Date	Tournament	Winning score	Margin of victory	Runners-up
1	2 Jul 2017	Tullymore Classic	−16 (64-68-68=200)	1 stroke	(Germany) Sophia Popov, (United States) Lindsey Weaver, (United States) Jessica Welch

=== China LPGA Tour wins (1) ===
- 2013 Srixon XXIO Ladies Open (as an amateur)

== Results in LPGA majors ==
Results not in chronological order.

Tournament	2018	2019	2020	2021	2022	2023	2024	2025	2026
Chevron Championship		T21	T22	T19	CUT	CUT	CUT	T74	CUT
U.S. Women's Open		T5	CUT	T46					
Women's PGA Championship	CUT	T43	CUT	T25	CUT	T47	CUT	CUT	CUT
The Evian Championship	CUT	T30	NT	CUT	T43	CUT			CUT
Women's British Open	T7	T29	CUT			T44			CUT

Top 10
Did not play

CUT = missed the half-way cut
NT = no tournament
"T" = tied

=== Summary ===
Tournament	Wins	2nd	3rd	Top-5	Top-10	Top-25	Events	Cuts made
Chevron Championship	0	0	0	0	0	3	8	4
U.S. Women's Open	0	0	0	1	1	1	3	2
Women's PGA Championship	0	0	0	0	0	1	9	3
The Evian Championship	0	0	0	0	0	0	6	2
Women's British Open	0	0	0	0	1	1	5	3
Totals	0	0	0	1	2	6	31	14

- Most consecutive cuts made – 6 (2019 ANA Inspiration – 2020 ANA Inspiration)
- Longest streak of top-10s – 1 (twice)

== Team appearances ==
Professional

- International Crown (representing China): 2023
