= Iacobelli =

Iacobelli is a surname. Notable people with the surname include:

- Daniela Iacobelli (born 1987), American golfer
- Olindo Iacobelli (born 1945), Italian racing driver

== See also ==
- Iacobellis, another surname
