= Eagle Classic (golf) =

Tournament information
- Location: Richmond, Virginia
- Established: 2008
- Course: Richmond Country Club
- Par: 72
- Length: 6,292 yards (5,753 m)
- Tour: Symetra Tour
- Format: Stroke play
- Prize fund: US$110,000
- Month played: August
- Final year: 2014

Tournament record score
- Aggregate: 203 Mo Martin (2011)
- To par: −13 Mo Martin (2011)

Final champion
- (United States) Marissa Steen

The Eagle Classic was an annual golf tournament for professional women golfers on the Symetra Tour, the official developmental tour of the LPGA. The event was played from 2008 to 2014 in the Richmond, Virginia area.

In 2009 the title sponsor was iMPACT Ventures, a consulting firm based in Fairfax, Virginia. In 2010, the tournament was held without a title sponsor. In 2011, Eagle Companies signed a three-year contract to become the tournament's title sponsor. Eagle had previously been involved as the presenting sponsor of the tournament.

The last benefiting charity of the Eagle Classic was the Massey Cancer Center.

Tournament names through the years:

- 2008: Greater Richmond Duramed Futures Classic
- 2009: iMPACT Classic
- 2010: Greater Richmond Golf Classic
- 2011–13: Eagle Classic
- 2014: Eagle Classic Presented by Bag Boy

== Winners ==
| Year | Dates | Champion | Country | Score | Purse ($) | Winner's share($) |
|---|---|---|---|---|---|---|
| 2014 | Aug 15–17 | Marissa Steen | United States | 202 (−14) | 100,000 | 15,000 |
| 2013 | Aug 16–18 | Christine Song | United States | 208 (−8) | 110,000 | 16,500 |
| 2012 | Aug 17–19 | Paola Moreno | Colombia | 207 (−9) | 100,000 | 15,000 |
| 2011 | Aug 12–14 | Mo Martin | United States | 203 (−13) | 100,000 | 14,000 |
| 2010 | Aug 13–15 | Jennifer Song^{1} | United States; South Korea | 204 (−12) | 100,000 | 14,000 |
| 2009 | Aug 14–16 | Lisa Meldrum | Canada | 208 (−8) | 100,000 | 14,000 |
| 2008 | Aug 15–17 | Haeji Kang | South Korea | 205 (−11) | 100,000 | 14,000 |

^{1}Won in a sudden-death playoff

== Tournament records ==
| Year | Player | Score | Round |
|---|---|---|---|
| 2008 | Haeji Kang | 65 (−7) | 1st |
| 2009 | Pernilla Lindberg | 65 (−7) | 1st |
| 2011 | Min Seo Kwak | 65 (−7) | 1st |
| 2014 | Demi Runas | 65 (−7) | 1st |
