= 2014 Symetra Tour =

The 2014 Symetra Tour was a series of professional women's golf tournaments held from February through September 2014 in the United States. The Symetra Tour is the second-tier women's professional golf tour in the United States and is the "official developmental tour" of the LPGA Tour. It was previously known as the Futures Tour. In 2014, total prize money on the Symetra Tour was $2,250,000.

== Leading money winners ==
The top ten money winners at the end of the season gained fully exempt cards on the LPGA Tour for the 2015 season.

Rank	Player	Country	Events	Prize money ($)
1	Marissa Steen	United States	16	75,348
2	Min Seo Kwak	South Korea	17	69,143
3	Jackie Stoelting	United States	19	60,452
4	Sadena Parks	United States	17	57,597
5	Min Lee	Chinese Taipei	18	57,011
6	Wei-Ling Hsu	Chinese Taipei	13	53,004
7	Yueer Cindy Feng	China	12	51,992
8	Kendall Dye	United States	20	47,684
9	Demi Runas	United States	20	45,095
10	Mallory Blackwelder	United States	20	41,381

== Schedule and results ==
The number in parentheses after winners' names show the player's total number of official money, individual event wins on the Symetra Tour including that event. A $1 million bonus was to be paid by Park Sterling Bank if one player won all three Carolina tournaments in May.

Date	Tournament	Location	Winner
Feb 21–23	Visit Mesa Gateway Classic	Arizona	(Canada) Alena Sharp (1)
Feb 28 – Mar 2	Volvik Championship	California	(United States) Kim Kaufman (2)
Mar 21–23	Florida's Natural Charity Classic	Florida	(China) Yueer Cindy Feng (1)
Mar 28–31	IOA Golf Classic	Florida	(United States) Kendall Dye (1)
Apr 25–27	Guardian Retirement Championship	Florida	(United States) Marissa Steen (1)
May 2–4	Chico's Patty Berg Memorial	Florida	(South Korea) Min Seo Kwak (1)
May 8–11	Self Regional Healthcare Foundation Women's Health Charity Classic	South Carolina	(Chinese Taipei) Wei-Ling Hsu (2)
May 16–18	Friends of Mission Charity Classic	North Carolina	(United States) Marissa Steen (2)
May 22–24	Symetra Classic	North Carolina	(United States) Mallory Blackwelder (1)
Jun 6–8	FireKeepers Casino Hotel Championship	Michigan	(South Korea) Min Seo Kwak (2)
Jun 13–15	Decatur-Forsyth Classic	Illinois	(United States) Madison Pressel (1)
Jun 20–22	Four Winds Invitational	Indiana	(Canada) Nicole Vandermade (1)
Jun 27–29	Island Resort Championship	Michigan	(United States) Molly Aronsson (1)
Jul 25–27	SEFCU Championship	New York	(United States) Sadena Parks (1)
Aug 1–3	Credit Union Classic	New York	(Venezuela) Veronica Felibert (1)
Aug 8–10	New England Charity Classic	New Hampshire	(United States) Sadena Parks (2)
Aug 15–17	Eagle Classic	Virginia	(United States) Marissa Steen (3)
Sep 5–7	Prairie Band Casino & Resort Charity Classic	Kansas	(United Kingdom) Olivia Jordan-Higgins (2)
Sep 11–13	Garden City Charity Classic	Kansas	(Chinese Taipei) Min Lee (1)
Sep 18–21	Symetra Tour Championship	Florida	(Norway) Marita Engzelius (1)

== Awards ==
- Player of the Year, player who leads the money list at the end of the season
  - (United States) Marissa Steen
- Gaëlle Truet Rookie of the Year Award, first year player with the highest finish on the official money list
  - (Chinese Taipei) Min Lee

== See also ==
- 2014 LPGA Tour
- 2014 in golf
