= Epson Tour Championship =

Golf tournament in Indiana

Tournament information
- Location: Indian Wells, California
- Established: 2008
- Courses: Indian Wells Golf Resort; Players Course
- Par: 71
- Length: 6,465 yards (5,912 m)
- Tour: Epson Tour
- Format: Stroke play
- Prize fund: $300,000
- Month played: October

Current champion
- (United States) Reagan Zibilski

The Epson Tour Championship is an annual golf tournament for professional women golfers on the Epson Tour, the LPGA's developmental tour. The event was played at LPGA International in Daytona Beach, Florida from 2008 to 2019, except for 2016. In 2008 and 2009 the tournament was played on the Jones Course. Beginning in 2010, it has been played on the Champions Course. The 2016 event was played at Alaqua Country Club in Longwood, Florida due to course conditions at LPGA International caused by Hurricane Matthew. In 2020, the event moved to River Run Country Club in Davidson, North Carolina. In 2024 the event was played on The Indian Wells Golf Resort's Players Course.

The tournament is a 72-hole event, as are most tour events, and includes pre-tournament pro-am opportunities, in which local amateur golfers can play with the professional golfers from the Tour as a benefit for local charities. For professionals, it is a final chance to get into the top fifteen on the tour's money list and earn an LPGA Tour card, or at least improve their status for LPGA Tour Qualifying School. The current benefiting charity of the Epson Tour Championship is the Boys & Girls Clubs of Volusia and Flagler Counties.

== Winners ==
Year	Date	Champion	Country	Score	Purse ($)	Winner's share ($)
Epson Tour Championship
2026	Oct 4	Reagan Zibilski	United States	269 (−15)	300,000	100,000
2025	Oct 5	Anne Chen	United States	266 (−22)	250,000	37,500
2024	Oct 6	Heather Lin	Chinese Taipei	268 (−16)	287,500	43,125
2023	Oct 8	Auston Kim	United States	265 (−23)	250,000	37,500
2022	Oct 9	Jaravee Boonchant	Thailand	265 (−23)	250,000	37,500
Symetra Tour Championship
2021	Oct 10	Prima Thammaraks	Thailand	266 (−22)	250,000	37,500
2020	Nov 6	Frida Kinhult	Sweden	278 (−10)	175,000	26,250
2019	Oct 6	Laura Wearn	United States	271 (−17)	225,000	34,500
2018	Oct 7	Ruixin Liu	China	269 (−19)	225,000	34,500
2017	Oct 8	Rachel Rohanna	United States	203 (−13)	200,000	30,000
2016	Oct 16	Nicole Broch Larsen	Denmark	266 (−18)	200,000	30,000
2015	Oct 18	Sherman Santiwiwatthanaphong	Thailand	274 (−14)	150,000	20,000
2014	Sep 21	Marita Engzelius	Norway	278 (−10)	125,000	18,750
2013	Sep 30	Megan McCrystal	United States	275 (−13)	125,000	18,750
Daytona Beach Invitational
2012	Sep 30	Daniela Iacobelli	United States	205 (−11)	125,000	18,750
2011	Apr 3	Haru Nomura	Japan	207 (−9)	100,000	14,000
2010	Apr 11	Kristie Smith	Australia	204 (−12)	100,000	14,000
iMPACT Invitational
2009	Apr 5	Misun Cho	South Korea	210 (−6)	100,000	14,000
American Systems Invitational
2008	Apr 6	Leah Wigger	United States	212 (−4)	100,000	14,000

== Tournament records ==
Year	Player	Score	Round	Course
2019	Pavarisa Yoktuan	62 (−10)	1st	Jones Course at LPGA International
2020	Demi Runas	66 (−6)	4th	River Run Country Club
