= Riviera Nayarit Classic =

The Riviera Nayarit Classic was an annual golf tournament for professional women golfers on the Symetra Tour, the LPGA Tour's developmental tour. It was the first full-field event on the Symetra Tour to be played outside the United States. It is played at El Tigre Golf and Country Club in Nuevo Vallarta, Nayarit, Mexico.

The tournament was a 54-hole event, as are most Symetra Tour tournaments, and included pre-tournament pro-am, in which local amateur golfers can play with the professional golfers from the Tour as a benefit for local charities.

Tournament names through the years:

- 2010: Riviera Nayarit Classic
- 2011: Santorini Riviera Nayarit Classic
- 2012: Riviera Nayarit Classic

== Winners ==
Year	Dates	Champion	Country	Score	Purse ($)	Winner's share ($)
2012	Apr 27–29	Esther Choe	United States	207 (−12)	125,000	18,750
2011	Apr 8–10	Ryann O'Toole	United States	211 (−8)	125,000	17,500
2010	Mar 26–28	Cindy LaCrosse	United States	209 (−10)	150,000	21,000

== Tournament records ==
Year	Player	Score	Round
2011	Ryann O'Toole	67 (−6)	3rd
2011	Miriam Nagl	67 (−6)	1st
2010	Victoria Elizabeth	67 (−6)	3rd
