= Cathryn Bristow =

New Zealand golfer

Personal information
- Nationality: New Zealand
- Born: 14 November 1984 (age 42) Auckland, New Zealand
- Height: 1.70 m (5 ft 7 in)

Career
- Sport: Golf
- Turned professional: 2009
- Current tours: Ladies European Tour; ALPG Tour
- Professional wins: 4

Number of wins by tour
- WPGA Tour of Australasia: 3
- Epson Tour: 1

Best results in LPGA major championships
- Chevron Championship: DNP
- Women's PGA C'ship: DNP
- U.S. Women's Open: CUT: 2012
- Women's British Open: CUT: 2014
- Evian Championship: DNP

Cathryn Bristow (born 14 November 1984) is a New Zealand professional golfer.

== College career ==
Bristow played for the Oregon Ducks.

== Professional career ==
She is a three-time winner on the ALPG Tour – once in 2012 and twice in 2016. She also won the Pennsylvania Classic on the Futures Tour in 2011.

Bristow has played on the Ladies European Tour since 2013.

=== 2016 Olympics ===
Bristow earned an Olympic qualification spot by finishing in the 11 July 2016 world rankings at 446th. However, she was not selected by her National Olympic Committee.

== Professional wins ==
=== ALPG Tour wins ===
- 2011/12 Moss Vale Golf Club ALPG Pro-Am
- 2016 Mulpha Norwest ALPG Pro Am, Northern Beaches Classic

=== Futures Tour wins ===
- 2011 Pennsylvania Classic

== Team appearances ==
Amateur

- Espirito Santo Trophy (representing New Zealand): 2008
- Queen Sirikit Cup (representing New Zealand): 2008

Professional

- The Queens (representing Australia): 2016, 2017
