= Symetra Classic =

The Symetra Classic was an annual golf tournament for professional women golfers on the Symetra Tour, the LPGA Tour's developmental tour. From 2009 to 2011, the tournament was played at The Dominion Country Club in San Antonio, Texas. The event moved to Charlotte, North Carolina in 2012 and was played at Raintree Country Club. It moved to Milton, Georgia in 2017 and was played at Atlanta National Golf Club. In 2018, it moved to River Run Country Club in Davidson, North Carolina.

The tournament was a 54-hole event, as were most Symetra Tour tournaments. The title sponsor of the tournament was Symetra Financial Corporation, a life insurance corporation with headquarters in Bellevue, Washington.

Tournament names through the years

- 2009–2010: Texas Hill Country Classic
- 2011–2021: Symetra Classic

== Winners ==
Year	Dates	Champion	Country	Score	Purse ($)	Winner's share ($)
2021	May 16	Casey Danielson	United States	210 (−6)	175,000	26,250
2020	Oct 4	Peiyun Chien	Chinese Taipei	202 (−14)	175,000	26,250
2019	May 17	Leona Maguire	Ireland	206 (−10)	175,000	26,250
2018	May 19	Jenny Haglund	Sweden	140 (−4)	175,000	26,250
2017	Apr 30	Nanna Koerstz Madsen	Denmark	205 (−11)	150,000	22,500
2016	May 15	Erica Popson	United States	208 (−8)	110,000	16,500
2015	May 23	Haruka Morita-WanyaoLu	China	204 (−12)	110,000	16,500
2014	May 24	Mallory Blackwelder	United States	206 (−10)	100,000	15,000
2013	May 11	Laura Kueny	United States	210 (−6)	100,000	15,000
2012	Sep 16	Mi Hyang Lee	South Korea	208 (−8)	100,000	15,000
2011	May 1	Lisa Ferrero	United States	210 (−6)	125,000	17,500
2010	May 2	Paola Moreno	Colombia	209 (−7)	125,000	17,500
2009	May 3	Allison Hanna-Williams	United States	209 (−7)	125,000	17,500

== Tournament record ==
Year	Player	Score	Round	Course
2020	Peiyun Chien	64 (−8)	1st	LPGA International, Jones Course
2017	Nanna Koerstz Madsen	65 (−7)	1st	Atlanta National Golf Club
2016	Kendall Dye	65 (−7)	2nd	Raintree Country Club
2011	Stephanie Connelly	66 (−6)	2nd	The Dominion Country Club
2011	Jodi Ewart	66 (−6)	2nd	The Dominion Country Club
2011	Lisa Ferrero	66 (−6)	2nd	The Dominion Country Club
2009	Alison Walshe	66 (−6)	2nd	The Dominion Country Club
