= South Shore Championship =

The South Shore Championship was a golf tournament for professional women golfers on the LPGA Futures Tour, the LPGA Tour's developmental tour. The event was played in 2011 at the White Hawk Country Club in the Crown Point, Indiana area.

The tournament was a 54-hole event, as are most LPGA Futures Tour tournaments, and included pre-tournament pro-am opportunities, in which local amateur golfers can play with the professional golfers from the Tour as a benefit for local charities. The benefiting charity from the South Shore Championship was Lake County United Way.

== Winners ==
Year	Dates	Champion	Country	Score	Margin of victory	Purse ($)	Winner's share ($)
2011	Jun 30 – Jul 2	Tiffany Joh	United States	138 (–6)*	2 strokes	100,000	14,000

*Tournament shortened to 36 holes because of rain.

== Tournament records ==
Year	Player	Score	Round
2011	Tiffany Joh	68 (–4)	1st
2011	Victoria Elizabeth	68 (–4)	1st
2011	Leah Wigger	68 (–4)	1st
2011	Mo Martin	68 (–4)	1st
2011	Rachel Ingram	68 (–4)	1st
2011	Dawn Shockley	68 (–4)	2nd
2011	Nicole Jeray	68 (–4)	2nd
2011	Meredith Duncan	68 (–4)	2nd
2011	Juliana Murcia Ortiz	68 (–4)	2nd
