= Marissa Steen =

American professional golfer

Personal information
- Nationality: United States
- Born: December 4, 1989 (age 36) Cincinnati, Ohio, U.S.
- Height: 5 ft 7 in (1.70 m)

Career
- Sport: Golf
- College: University of Memphis
- Turned professional: 2012
- Current tour: Epson Tour
- Former tour: LPGA Tour
- Professional wins: 3

Number of wins by tour
- Epson Tour: 3

Best results in LPGA major championships
- Chevron Championship: T68: 2019
- Women's PGA C'ship: T24: 2023
- U.S. Women's Open: T34: 2022
- Women's British Open: T10: 2021
- Evian Championship: CUT: 2017, 2021

Achievements and awards
- Symetra Tour Player of the Year: 2014

Marissa Steen (born 4 December 1989) is an American professional golfer and LPGA Tour member. She was Symetra Tour Player of the Year in 2014.

== Early life, college and amateur career ==
Steen grew up in West Chester, a suburb of Cincinnati, Ohio and started playing golf at the age of 14. She attended Lakota West High School where she played golf, basketball, softball and played trumpet in the band. A standout performer, she was a member of her high school's 2006 State Championship golf team, coached by local golf professional, Tim Lambert.

Steen attended the University of Memphis between 2008 and 2012, and earned a bachelor's degree in Sports Management. She competed in every golf event for four years while at Memphis, setting a fair number of records.

== Professional career ==
Steen turned professional and joined the Symetra Tour in 2012. She ended her rookie season ranked 34th, and improved to a rank of 16th in 2013. In 2014 she won the Guardian Retirement Championship at Sara Bay, the Friends of Mission Charity Classic Classic and the Eagle Classic, to earn a "battlefield promotion" to the LPGA Tour. She topped the money list and was awarded Symetra Tour Player of the Year.

2015 was her rookie season on the LPGA Tour. Unfortunately, she sustained an injury early in the season. Returning to the Symetra Tour, she earned promotion to the LPGA Tour again after finishing 8th on the 2016 Symetra Tour Money List. In 2017 she finished T10 at the LPGA Final Qualifying Tournament to keep her card for the 2018 LPGA Tour. In 2018 she made two starts on the LPGA Tour before an ankle injury sidelined her for the season.

She finished T8 at the 2019 Women's Australian Open and tied for 10th at the 2021 AIG Women's Open.

== Amateur wins ==
- 2010 (3) USA Lady Jaguar Invitational, Montana Bobcat Invitational, UAB Fall Beach Blast
- 2011 (3) Cincinnati Women's Metropolitan Championship, Lady Eagle Invitational, Memphis Women's Fall Invitational
- 2012 (1) Chris Banister Golf Classic

== Professional wins (3) ==
=== Symetra Tour wins (3) ===
No.	Date	Tournament	Winning score	Margin of victory	Runner-up
1	Apr 27, 2014	Guardian Retirement Championship	−3 (72-72-69=213)	Playoff	(China) Yueer Cindy Feng
2	May 18, 2014	Friends of Mission Charity Classic	−4 (72-67-69=208)	4 strokes	(Chinese Taipei) Wei-Ling Hsu
3	Aug 17, 2014	Eagle Classic	−14 (68-68-66=202)	4 strokes	(United States) Demi Runas

== Results in LPGA majors ==
Results not in chronological order.

Tournament	2014	2015	2016	2017	2018	2019	2020	2021	2022	2023	2024
Chevron Championship			CUT			T68		CUT			
U.S. Women's Open	CUT			T51		CUT			T34		T69
Women's PGA Championship		CUT		CUT		77		CUT	CUT	T24	
The Evian Championship				CUT			NT	CUT			
Women's British Open				T75				T10			

Top 10
Did not play

CUT = missed the half-way cut
NT = no tournament
T = tied
