= Lindsey Weaver-Wright =

American professional golfer (born 1993)

Personal information
- Full name: Lindsey Kathryn Weaver-Wright
- Nationality: United States
- Born: September 16, 1993 (age 33) Waite Hill, Ohio, U.S.
- Height: 5 ft 3 in (1.60 m)
- Spouse: Zach Wright

Career
- Sport: Golf
- College: Notre Dame University; University of Arizona
- Turned professional: 2016
- Former tours: LPGA Tour; Symetra Tour
- Professional wins: 1

Number of wins by tour
- Epson Tour: 1

Best results in LPGA major championships
- Chevron Championship: T28: 2023
- Women's PGA C'ship: T27: 2021
- U.S. Women's Open: T46: 2020
- Women's British Open: T19: 2021
- Evian Championship: T60: 2021

Achievements and awards
- Big East Conference Player of the Year: 2012/13
- Big East Conference Freshman of the Year: 2012/13

Lindsey Kathryn Weaver-Wright (born September 16, 1993) is an American professional golfer and LPGA Tour member. She shot a 59 during the 2012 Ping Junior Interclub match to become the second female golfer in history to do so, first being Annika Sörenstam.

== Early life and junior career ==
Weaver was born in Waite Hill, Ohio. Her path to professional golf started at age two. Her father Craig, a runner who ran track at Otterbein University, used to carry her from shot to shot when she got tired of playing.

Her family relocated to Scottsdale, Arizona when she was 11 so that she and her older sister Lauren, who later would play golf at Northwestern University, could play and practice year round. The same year she volunteered at the LPGA's Safeway Classic held in Arizona and met Annika Sörenstam and Brittany Lincicome, which served as inspiration.

Weaver attended Cactus Shadows High School in Scottsdale and had a successful junior career. She was named Rolex Junior All-American four-times, winning regional and state championships in her freshman year. She recorded 11 AJGA individual wins 2006–2012 including four in 2012, ranking as the top female golfer in the AJGA for most wins in a single year. She also set the record for most years with at least one win, having secured a title each in the seven years 2006–2012.

Weaver helped the U.S. capture the 2011 Junior Solheim Cup after securing a crucial 12th point with a 2 and 1 win over England's Charley Hull. She qualified for the 2012 U.S. Women's Open at Scottsdale's Terravita Golf Club.

Weaver shot a 59 on the Apache Course at Desert Mountain during the 2012 Ping Junior Interclub match to become the second female golfer in history to do so, first being Annika Sörenstam. She ranked as the No. 3 recruit in the nation on the Junior Golf Scoreboard, seventh in the Golfweek Junior Golf rankings and 20th in the Polo golf rankings coming out of high school.

== College career ==
Weaver graduated high school in 2012 and was awarded a full athletic scholarship to the University of Notre Dame in Indiana. In her freshman year, she finished the fall season ranked as the number one collegiate golfer in the nation according to Golfstat's rankings. She set a school record by posting the lowest ever scoring average of 72.71 and set the record for the lowest score in the history of the Big East Conference Championship when she won with 210 (−6). She was named both Big East Conference Freshman of the Year and Player of the Year.

After her freshman year at Notre Dame, Weaver transferred to the University of Arizona and joined the Arizona Wildcats women's golf team. In 2014, she was individual runner-up at the PAC-12 Championship behind Alison Lee, and finished tied 16th at the NCAA Championship, and played in the U.S. Women's Amateur. She led the Wildcats in scoring average each of her three seasons and won the Pac-12 Conference Championship with the Wildcats in 2015. She was twice named WGCA All-American. She qualified for the 2015 U.S. Women's Open.

== Professional career ==
Weaver turned professional after her graduation in May 2016. She quickly entered a Cactus Tour event at Mission Hills Country Club in Rancho Mirage, California, which she won. She went through LPGA Qualifying Tournament and joined the Symetra Tour in 2017, where she finished 4th at her first event, the Florida's Natural Charity Classic. In her rookie season, she recorded 11 top-10 finishes, including a victory at the Guardian Championship. She finished seventh on the Symetra Tour official money list to earn membership for the 2018 LPGA Tour.

She made five cuts in eight starts during a 2018 rookie season cut short by injury. She kept her LPGA Tour status for 2020 by finishing fifth in the 2019 LPGA Final Qualifying Tournament.

After two rounds at the 2020 Women's British Open at Royal Troon, Weaver was in a tie for fourth place, only two strokes behind leader Daniela Holmqvist. She finished tied for 19th after a final round of 75. In 2020, she finished 49th on the money list and in 2021 in 75th place.

Weaver-Wright retired following the 2025 season.

== Personal life ==
She competed as Lindsey Weaver until November 2021 when she married Zach Wright, a professional golfer who has played on the Korn Ferry Tour. The two met when they were 12 and dated for a couple of years in high school, before reconnecting in December 2017. They live in Dallas, Texas and practice together at the Old American Golf Club. She announced her first pregnancy, age 29, due in December 2023, after the conclusion of the Meijer LPGA Classic on June 18, 2023. At the tournament, she finished T-20th (277, −11) earning $25,108.

== Amateur wins ==
- 2011 McArthur Future Legends, AJGA Stonehenge Open
- 2012 Winn Grips Heather Farr Classic, Ping Phoenix Junior at ASU Karsten, Under Armour - Jeff Overton Junior
- 2013 Big East Championship, Windy City Collegiate Championship

== Professional wins (1) ==
=== Symetra Tour wins (1) ===
| No. | Date | Tournament | Winning score | Margin of victory | Runner-up |
|---|---|---|---|---|---|
| 1 | Sep 24, 2017 | Guardian Championship | −12 (71-65-68=204) | 1 stroke | (China) Liu Yu |

LPGA Tour playoff record (0–1)

| No. | Year | Tournament | Opponent | Result |
|---|---|---|---|---|
| 1 | 2022 | ShopRite LPGA Classic | (Canada) Brooke Henderson | Lost to eagle on first extra hole |

== Results in LPGA majors ==
Results not in chronological order.

| Tournament | 2012 | 2013 | 2014 | 2015 | 2016 | 2017 | 2018 | 2019 | 2020 | 2021 | 2022 | 2023 | 2024 |
|---|---|---|---|---|---|---|---|---|---|---|---|---|---|
| Chevron Championship | | | | | | | CUT | | CUT | CUT | T53 | T28 | T67 |
| U.S. Women's Open | CUT | | | CUT | | | | | T46 | | | | |
| Women's PGA Championship | | | | | | | | CUT | CUT | T27 | CUT | T39 | T35 |
| The Evian Championship | | | | | | | | | NT | T60 | CUT | CUT | |
| Women's British Open | | | | | | | | | T19 | CUT | CUT | T50 | |

Did not play

CUT = missed the half-way cut
NT = no tournament
T = tied

== U.S. national team appearances ==
Amateur

- Junior Solheim Cup: 2011 (winners)
