= Elisa Serramià =

Spanish professional golfer

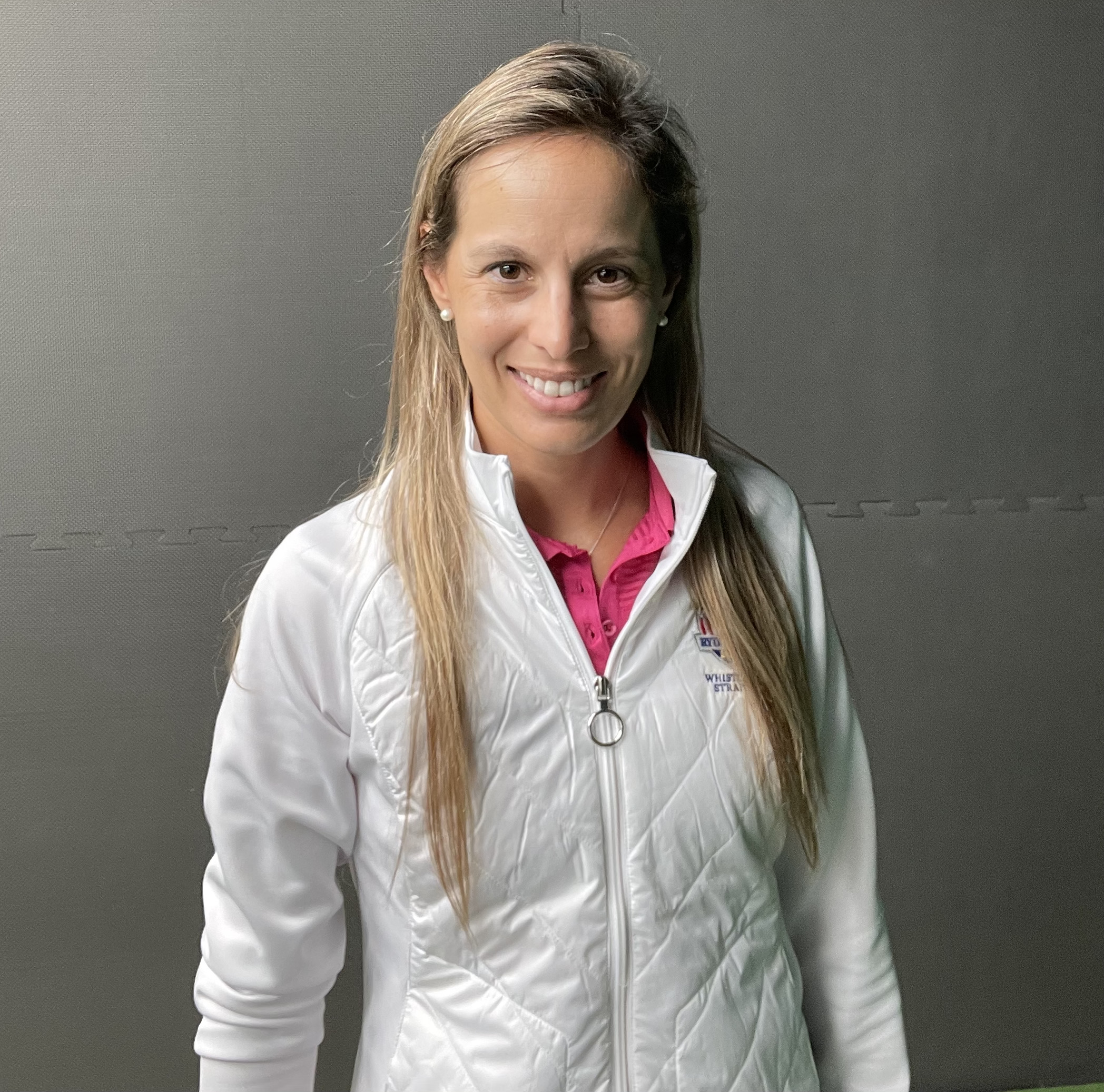
- Elisa Serramia in 2021

Personal information
- Full name: Elisa Serramià Neundorf
- Nationality: Spain
- Born: 7 September 1984 (age 42) Barcelona, Spain
- Height: 175 cm (5 ft 9 in)

Career
- Sport: Golf
- Turned professional: 2004
- Former tours: Ladies European Tour (joined 2005); Symetra Tour (joined 2009); LPGA Tour (joined 2012)
- Professional wins: 1

Number of wins by tour
- Epson Tour: 1

Best results in LPGA major championships
- Chevron Championship: DNP
- Women's PGA C'ship: DNP
- U.S. Women's Open: DNP
- Women's British Open: T46: 2003

Achievements and awards
- Smyth Salver: 2003
- LET Rookie of the Year: 2005

Elisa Serramià Neundorf (born 7 September 1984) is a Spanish professional golfer who played on the Ladies European Tour and the U.S-based LPGA Tour. She won British Ladies Amateur in 2003 and was LET Rookie of the Year in 2005.

== Amateur career ==
Serramià was member of the National Team between 2001 and 2004, and was part of the Spanish teams that won the European Girls' Team Championship in 2001 and the European Ladies' Team Championship in 2003. She represented Europe at the 2002 Junior Solheim Cup and the 2003 Vagliano Trophy, and Spain at the 2004 Espirito Santo Trophy together with María Hernández and Beatriz Recari.

Serramià won the 2003 British Ladies Amateur earning a spot at the 2003 Women's British Open, where she was the low amateur. In 2004, she won the French International Lady Juniors Amateur Championship and was runner-up at the European Ladies Amateur Championship.

== Professional career ==
Serramià turned professional in late 2004 and joined the Ladies European Tour in 2005, where she finished tied 7th in her first tournament, the Samsung Ladies Masters in Singapore, and ended the season LET Rookie of the Year. In 2006, she was T3 at the Ladies Italian Open and T4 at the Open De España Femenino, to finish 32nd on the Order of Merit.

In 2009, Serramià joined the Symetra Tour, where she made 11 out of 14 cuts and won her first professional title, the Mercedes-Benz of Kansas City Championship. She was successful at the 2011 LPGA Final Qualifying Tournament and joined the LPGA Tour in 2012.

== Amateur wins ==
- 2003 British Ladies Amateur
- 2004 French International Lady Juniors Amateur Championship

== Professional wins (1) ==
=== Symetra Tour (1) ===
- 2009 Mercedes-Benz of Kansas City Championship

== Team appearances ==
Amateur

- European Girls' Team Championship (representing Spain): 2001 (winners)
- Junior Solheim Cup (representing Europe): 2002
- Vagliano Trophy (representing the Continent of Europe): 2003
- European Ladies' Team Championship (representing Spain): 2003 (winners)
- European Lady Junior's Team Championship (representing Spain): 2002, 2004 (winners)
- Espirito Santo Trophy (representing Spain): 2004
