= Jeanne-Marie Busuttil =

French professional golfer

Personal information
- Full name: Jeanne-Marie Busuttil
- Nationality: France
- Born: 29 June 1976 (age 50) Paris, France
- Height: 5 ft 2 in (1.57 m)
- Spouse: Pete Dunham

Career
- Sport: Golf
- College: University of Florida; Arizona State University
- Turned professional: 1998
- Former tours: Futures Tour; LPGA Tour (2002-2004); Ladies European Tour
- Professional wins: 1

Number of wins by tour
- Epson Tour: 1

Best results in LPGA major championships
- Chevron Championship: DNP
- Women's PGA C'ship: CUT: 2002
- U.S. Women's Open: CUT: 1999, 2000
- du Maurier Classic: DNP
- Women's British Open: DNP

Achievements and awards
- NCAA All-American: 1995, 1996

Jeanne-Marie Busuttil (born 29 June 1976) is a professional golfer from France who was a member of the LPGA Tour in the early 2000s.

== Early life and amateur career ==
In 1976, Busuttil was born in Paris, France. Busuttil won the French Junior Championship in 1991 and became a member of the French National team from 1993 to 1997.

Busuttil moved to America where she attended the University of Florida and Arizona State University, playing on teams for both schools. While at Arizona State University, she won two collegiate tournaments: the 1995 South Carolina Invitational and the 1996 NCAA East Regional. She was a three-time NCAA All-American and was a member of the 1997-98 NCAA Championship team at Arizona State.

== Professional career ==
In 1998, Busuttil turned professional after lettering at Arizona State from 1996 to 1998. She competed on the Futures Tour, where she won one tournament and finished fifth on the money list. She was also a member of the Ladies European Tour.

In 2001, she finished second at the LPGA Final Qualifying Tournament to earn exempt status for the 2002 season.

== Professional wins (1) ==
=== Futures Tour wins (1) ===
- 2001 M&T Bank Loretto FUTURES Golf Classic

== Team appearances ==
Amateur

- European Ladies' Team Championship (representing France): 1997

== See also ==
- List of Florida Gators women's golfers on the LPGA Tour
