= Ryann O'Toole =

American professional golfer (born 1987)

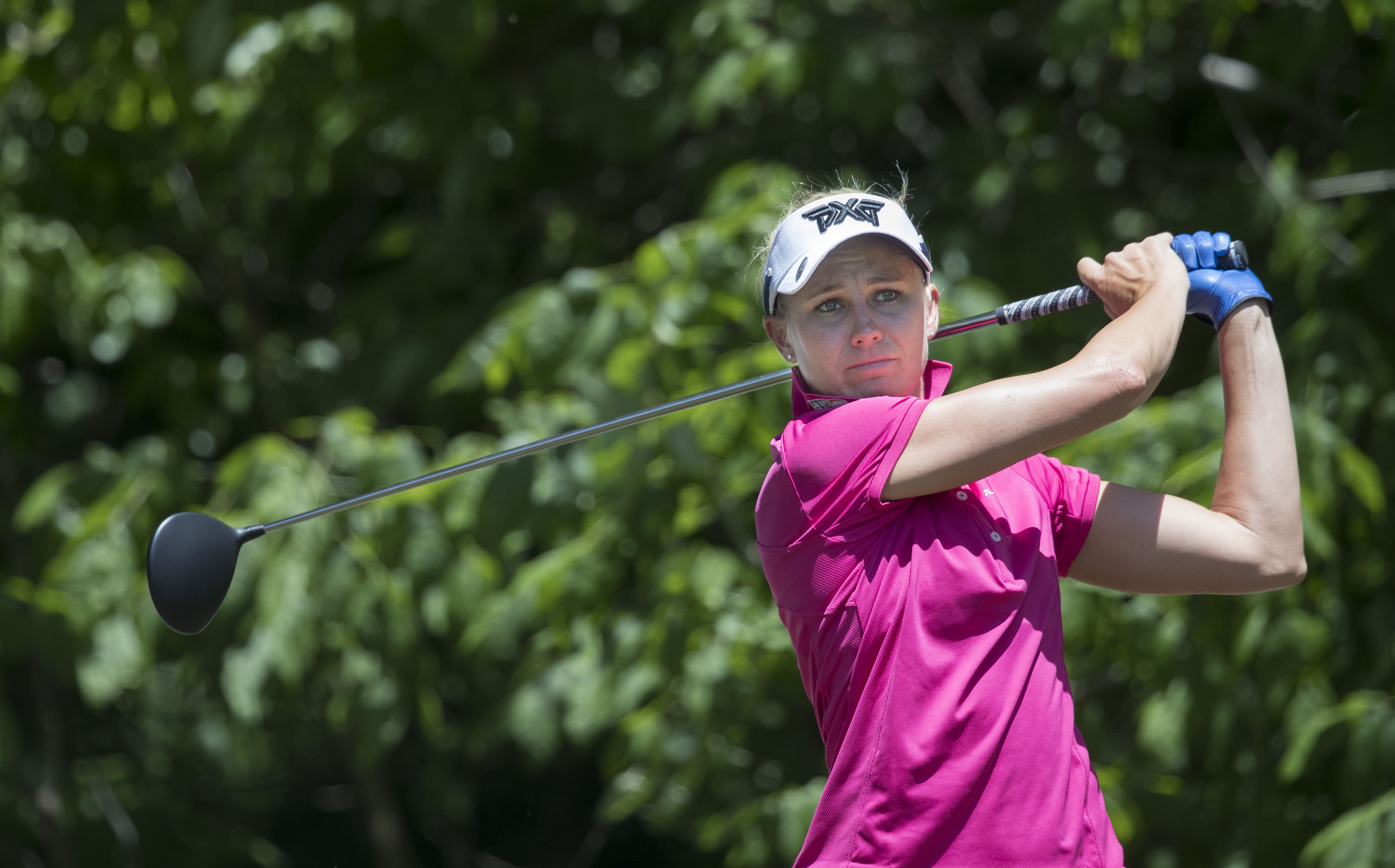

Personal information
- Full name: Ryann Ashley O'Toole
- Nationality: United States
- Born: February 11, 1987 (age 39) Agoura Hills, California, U.S.
- Height: 5 ft 7 in (1.70 m)
- Spouse: Gina Marra

Career
- Sport: Golf
- College: UCLA
- Turned professional: 2009
- Current tour: LPGA Tour (joined 2011)
- Former tour: Futures Tour (joined 2009)
- Professional wins: 4

Number of wins by tour
- LPGA Tour: 1
- Ladies European Tour: 1
- Epson Tour: 3

Best results in LPGA major championships
- Chevron Championship: T7: 2026
- Women's PGA C'ship: T18: 2018
- U.S. Women's Open: 9th: 2011
- Women's British Open: T21: 2023
- Evian Championship: T6: 2018

Ryann Ashley O'Toole (born February 11, 1987) is an American female professional golfer currently playing on the LPGA Tour.

== Early life and amateur career ==
In 1987, O'Toole was born in Agoura Hills, California. In 2005, she graduated from San Clemente High School in 2005.

O'Toole played college golf at UCLA and recorded twelve top-10 finishes during her college career. She holds the course record at Royal Colwood Golf Club in Victoria, British Columbia, Canada, with a 66. In 2009, O'Toole graduated with a bachelor's degree in sociology.

== Professional career ==
O'Toole turned professional in 2009, and joined the Futures Tour on February 1, 2009. She competed in eight events on ended the season 80th on the Futures Tour money list. O'Toole participated in the LPGA Final Qualifying Tournament ("Q-School") in December in an attempt to earn membership on the LPGA Tour for 2010, but finished 73rd and failed to qualify.

She returned to the Futures Tour in 2010, competed in 16 events, won twice, and finished 7th on the official season-ending money list. She also played in her first LPGA tournament in August 2010 when she received a sponsor's exemption to the CN Canadian Women's Open in Winnipeg, but missed the cut. Her top-10 finish on the Futures tour money list in 2010 earned her conditional status on the LPGA Tour for 2011. She returned to the LPGA Final Qualifying Tournament in December in an attempt to improve her status but was unsuccessful with a 95th-place finish.

She started 2011 playing on the Futures Tour and in the events on the LPGA Tour that her relatively low priority status qualified her for. After a 9th-place finish at the U.S. Women's Open in Colorado Springs, her priority status improved, which gave her entry into more tournaments. After O'Toole finished tied for fifth at the Safeway Classic on August 21, U.S. Solheim team captain Rosie Jones named her one of two captain's picks for the 2011 Solheim Cup team.

She won her first LPGA Tour event on August 15, 2021, at the Trust Golf Women's Scottish Open with a 271 (−17), by three strokes over both Lydia Ko and Atthaya Thitikul. It was her 11th season on tour and her 228th LPGA Tour start.

=== The Big Break ===
O'Toole was a cast member on the reality television competition show, The Big Break Sandals Resort, which aired in 2010 on Golf Channel. O'Toole finished in sixth place out of eleven golfers competing.

== Personal life ==
She is openly gay. After coming out to her parents in high school, she experienced a strained relationship with them and found solace in golf.

== Professional wins (4) ==
=== LPGA Tour wins (1) ===
| No. | Date | Tournament | Winning score | To par | Margin of victory | Runners-up | Winner's share ($) |
|---|---|---|---|---|---|---|---|
| 1 | Aug 15, 2021 | Trust Golf Women's Scottish Open^ | 68-71-68-64=271 | −17 | 3 strokes | (New Zealand) Lydia Ko (Thailand) Atthaya Thitikul | 225,000 |

^Co-sanctioned by the Ladies European Tour

LPGA Tour playoff record (0–1)

| No. | Year | Tournament | Opponents | Result |
|---|---|---|---|---|
| 1 | 2024 | Fir Hills Seri Pak Championship | (United States) Nelly Korda | Korda won with a birdie on the first extra hole |

=== Futures Tour wins (3) ===
| No. | Date | Tournament | Winning score | To par | Margin of victory | Runner(s)-up | Winner's share ($) |
|---|---|---|---|---|---|---|---|
| 1 | May 16, 2010 | Mercedes-Benz of Kansas City Championship | 31-34=65 ^{1} | −6 | 2 strokes | (Netherlands) Dewi Claire Schreefel | 7,000 |
| 2 | Jul 4, 2010 | Falls Auto Group Classic | 68-69-65=202 | −14 | Playoff ^{2} | (Canada) Angela Buzminski | 16,100 |
| 3 | Apr 10, 2011 | Santorini Riviera Nayarit Classic | 73-71-67=211 | −8 | 1 stroke | (United States) Dawn Shockley (United States) Nicole Smith | 17,500 |

^{1} Shortened by rain from 54 to 18 holes, purse reduced.
^{2} Won playoff with a birdie on second extra hole.

== Results in LPGA majors ==
Results not in chronological order.

| Tournament | 2011 | 2012 | 2013 | 2014 | 2015 | 2016 | 2017 | 2018 | 2019 | 2020 |
|---|---|---|---|---|---|---|---|---|---|---|
| Chevron Championship | | CUT | | | | T50 | CUT | T13 | T44 | T62 |
| Women's PGA Championship | T57 | T36 | CUT | CUT | CUT | T46 | T50 | T18 | T74 | CUT |
| U.S. Women's Open | 9 | CUT | T42 | | T20 | T55 | T54 | T52 | T39 | CUT |
| The Evian Championship ^ | | | CUT | | T38 | CUT | T58 | T6 | T62 | NT |
| Women's British Open | | CUT | T25 | | | CUT | CUT | T22 | CUT | |

| Tournament | 2021 | 2022 | 2023 | 2024 | 2025 | 2026 |
|---|---|---|---|---|---|---|
| Chevron Championship | T19 | T13 | T54 | 69 | T79 | T7 |
| U.S. Women's Open | | T28 | CUT | CUT | | |
| Women's PGA Championship | T33 | T54 | CUT | CUT | T52 | WD |
| The Evian Championship | T17 | CUT | T28 | T35 | CUT | 63 |
| Women's British Open | CUT | 64 | T21 | CUT | | CUT |

^ The Evian Championship was added as a major in 2013.

Top 10
Did not play

CUT = missed the half-way cut
NT = no tournament
WD = withdrew
"T" = tied

=== Summary ===
| Tournament | Wins | 2nd | 3rd | Top-5 | Top-10 | Top-25 | Events | Cuts made |
|---|---|---|---|---|---|---|---|---|
| Chevron Championship | 0 | 0 | 0 | 0 | 1 | 4 | 12 | 10 |
| U.S. Women's Open | 0 | 0 | 0 | 0 | 1 | 2 | 11 | 8 |
| Women's PGA Championship | 0 | 0 | 0 | 0 | 0 | 1 | 16 | 9 |
| The Evian Championship | 0 | 0 | 0 | 0 | 1 | 2 | 12 | 8 |
| Women's British Open | 0 | 0 | 0 | 0 | 0 | 3 | 11 | 4 |
| Totals | 0 | 0 | 0 | 0 | 3 | 12 | 62 | 39 |

- Most consecutive cuts made – 10 (2017 Evian – 2019 Evian)
- Longest streak of top-10s – 1 (three times)

== LPGA Tour career summary ==
| Year | Tournaments played | Cuts made | Wins | 2nd | 3rd | Top 10s | Best finish | Earnings ($) | Money list rank | Scoring average | Scoring rank |
|---|---|---|---|---|---|---|---|---|---|---|---|
| 2010 | 1 | 0 | 0 | 0 | 0 | 0 | T106 | 0 | n/a | 76.00 | n/a |
| 2011 | 15 | 11 | 0 | 0 | 0 | 2 | T5 | 192,748 | 46 | 73.57 | 87 |
| 2012 | 21 | 8 | 0 | 0 | 0 | 0 | T17 | 53,590 | 96 | 74.30 | 119 |
| 2013 | 20 | 13 | 0 | 0 | 0 | 0 | T20 | 100,554 | 85 | 72.90 | 89 |
| 2014 | 18 | 5 | 0 | 0 | 0 | 0 | T38 | 26,044 | 130 | 73.78 | 143 |
| 2015 | 24 | 16 | 0 | 0 | 0 | 0 | T12 | 208,565 | 70 | 71.74 | 46 |
| 2016 | 27 | 21 | 0 | 0 | 0 | 3 | T6 | 352,804 | 54 | 71.56 | 45 |
| 2017 | 25 | 20 | 0 | 0 | 0 | 1 | T7 | 213,016 | 75 | 71.94 | 92 |
| 2018 | 26 | 22 | 0 | 0 | 2 | 3 | 3 | 627,205 | 32 | 71.36 | 44 |
| 2019 | 22 | 14 | 0 | 0 | 0 | 1 | T6 | 199,641 | 76 | 72.06 | 103 |
| 2020 | 14 | 6 | 0 | 0 | 0 | 1 | T6 | 63,200 | 99 | 73.00 | 105 |
| 2021 | 22 | 18 | 1 | 0 | 0 | 1 | 1 | 531,827 | 38 | 70.76 | 36 |
| 2022 | 23 | 20 | 0 | 0 | 0 | 4 | T5 | 616,600 | 50 | 71.09 | 52 |
| 2023 | 23 | 15 | 0 | 0 | 0 | 1 | 4 | 381,056 | 74 | 72.10 | 104 |
| 2024 | 25 | 14 | 0 | 1 | 0 | 3 | 2 | 629,315 | 62 | 71.83 | 82 |
| 2025 | 16 | 8 | 0 | 0 | 0 | 0 | T20 | 120,119 | 123 | 72.89 | 135 |

- Official through 2025 season

== Futures Tour summary ==
| Year | Tournaments played | Cuts made | Wins | 2nd | 3rd | Top 10s | Best finish | Earnings ($) | Money list rank | Scoring average | Scoring rank |
|---|---|---|---|---|---|---|---|---|---|---|---|
| 2009 | 8 | 7 | 0 | 0 | 0 | 1 | T10 | 6,237 | 80 | 72.39 | n/a (17) |
| 2010 | 16 | 13 | 2 | | | 6 | 1 | 45,806 | 7 | 71.05 | 9 |
| 2011 | 3 | 3 | 1 | 0 | 0 | 2 | 1 | 20,336 | 24 | 71.10 | n/a (2) |

== World ranking ==
Position in Women's World Golf Rankings at the end of each calendar year.

| Year | World ranking | Source |
|---|---|---|
| 2010 | 320 | |
| 2011 | 120 | |
| 2012 | 198 | |
| 2013 | 226 | |
| 2014 | 350 | |
| 2015 | 130 | |
| 2016 | 82 | |
| 2017 | 125 | |
| 2018 | 50 | |
| 2019 | 90 | |
| 2020 | 148 | |
| 2021 | 71 | |
| 2022 | 63 | |
| 2023 | 116 | |
| 2024 | 90 | |
| 2025 | 209 | |

== Team appearances ==
Professional

- Solheim Cup (representing the United States): 2011

=== Solheim Cup record ===
| Year | Total matches | Total W-L-H | Singles W-L-H | Foursomes W-L-H | Fourballs W-L-H | Points won | Points % |
|---|---|---|---|---|---|---|---|
| Career | 4 | 2-0-2 | 0-0-1 | 1-0-0 | 1-0-1 | 3 | 75% |
| 2011 | 4 | 2-0-2 | 0-0-1 halved w/ Caroline Hedwall | 1-0-0 won w/ M. Pressel | 1-0-1 halved w/ C. Kim, won w/ S. Lewis 2&1 | 3 | 75% |
