= Tiffany Joh =

American professional golfer (born 1986)

Personal information
- Nationality: United States
- Born: December 8, 1986 (age 39) Philadelphia, Pennsylvania, U.S.
- Height: 5 ft 6 in (1.68 m)

Career
- Sport: Golf
- College: UCLA (graduated 2009)
- Turned professional: 2009
- Current tours: Symetra Tour (joined 2009); LPGA Tour (joined 2011)
- Professional wins: 2

Number of wins by tour
- Epson Tour: 2

Best results in LPGA major championships
- Chevron Championship: T16: 2014
- Women's PGA C'ship: T17: 2016
- U.S. Women's Open: CUT: 2010, 2012, 2013, 2015, 2017
- Women's British Open: T30: 2011
- Evian Championship: T43: 2016

Achievements and awards
- Heather Farr Player Award: 2017

Tiffany Joh (born December 8, 1986) is an American professional golfer currently playing on the LPGA Tour and on the Symetra Tour.

== Childhood ==
Joh was born in Philadelphia, Pennsylvania, and moved to San Diego, California as a young child. Both her parents were born in South Korea and moved to the United States as adults. She attended Rancho Bernardo High School where she earned American Junior Golf Association (AJGA) HP Scholastic All-America honors.

== Amateur career ==
In 2006 and 2008, Joh won the Women's Amateur Public Links Championship. She is one of five players in the history of the tournament to win the tournament twice. She was a member of the 2008 U.S. Curtis Cup Team

In August 2007, she finished tied for 21st at the Safeway Classic on the LPGA Tour.

=== College ===
Joh attended UCLA where she was a member of the golf team for all four years, from 2005 through her graduation in 2009. She was a four-time All-Pac-10 selection (1st Team in 2006 and 2008) and four-time All-American, and was a seven-time member of the Director's Honor Roll at UCLA, awarded to student athletes with a 3.0 or higher grade point average.

In 2006-07, her sophomore year, she won the Pac-10 title. She was the Pac-10 player of the year twice, in 2006–07 and in 2007-08.

At the 2008 NCAA Division I Golf Championship (May 20–23), Joh lost in a playoff to Azahara Muñoz of Arizona State for the individual championship in Albuquerque, New Mexico, after they tied at 287 (−1). Joh was named 2008 Pac-10 Golfer of the Year, and captured her third All-America nod from the National Golf Coaches Association (NGCA) after leading the Bruins in every statistical category during the 2008 season. She was ranked among the nation's top five players all season.

Joh was inducted into the UCLA Athletics Hall of Fame as a member of the 2022 class.

== Professional career ==
After graduating from UCLA in June 2009 with a degree in communication studies, Joh turned professional and joined the Futures Tour, the official development tour of the LPGA Tour. She won one event on tour in 2010, the ING New England Golf Classic. She finished T22 at the Final LPGA Qualifying Tournament in 2010 to earn conditional playing privileges on the LPGA Tour for 2011 while still retaining privileges on the Futures Tour. She won again on the Futures Tour in 2011 at the South Shore Championship and had two top-30 finishes on the LPGA by the halfway point in the season. Her good performance on the LPGA Tour improved her priority status on the LPGA Tour and gave her entry to more tournaments in the second half of the 2011 LPGA season.

On September 18, 2011, Joh had her best yet finish on the LPGA Tour, as the runner-up at the Navistar LPGA Classic, five strokes behind winner Lexi Thompson. She earned $120,057 for the solo second-place finish, her largest payday to date as a professional. Her 2011 season earnings on the LPGA Tour were $237,365 from participating in 14 tournaments. This put her in 41st place on the season-ending money list, enough to earn full privileges on the LPGA Tour for the 2012 season.

In 2012, Joh's rookie year on the LPGA, she finished 101st on the official LPGA money list which gave her limited playing privileges on the LPGA in 2013. She retained status on the Symetra Tour.

Joh was diagnosed with having a melanoma in January 2017. She returned to the LPGA Tour two months later.

She was the winner of the inaugural European eTour match at Pinehurst #2 in 2020, defeating Jane Park 2 up.

== Professional wins (2) ==
=== Futures Tour wins (2) ===
| No. | Date | Tournament | Winning score | To par | Margin of victory | Runner(s)-up | Winner's share ($) |
|---|---|---|---|---|---|---|---|
| 1 | Jul 18, 2010 | ING New England Golf Classic | 67-65-68=200 | −10 | Playoff | (United States) Gerina Mendoza | 14,000 |
| 2 | Jul 2, 2011 | South Shore Championship | 68-70=138^ | −6 | 2 strokes | (United States) Mallory Blackwelder (United States) Jane Rah (United States) Tiffany Tavee | 14,000 |

^ Tournament was shortened to 36 holes due to rain.

== Results in LPGA majors ==
Results not in chronological order before 2020.

| Tournament | 2009 | 2010 | 2011 | 2012 | 2013 | 2014 | 2015 | 2016 | 2017 | 2018 | 2019 |
|---|---|---|---|---|---|---|---|---|---|---|---|
| ANA Inspiration | T21LA | | | CUT | | T16 | CUT | CUT | | T72 | |
| U.S. Women's Open | | CUT | | CUT | CUT | | CUT | | CUT | | |
| Women's PGA Championship | | | T25 | CUT | T72 | T30 | CUT | T17 | CUT | CUT | T53 |
| The Evian Championship ^ | | | | | | CUT | CUT | T43 | T64 | CUT | T70 |
| Women's British Open | | | T30 | | | CUT | T61 | T65 | T43 | T42 | CUT |

| Tournament | 2020 | 2021 |
|---|---|---|
| ANA Inspiration | CUT | CUT |
| U.S. Women's Open | | |
| Women's PGA Championship | CUT | |
| The Evian Championship ^ | NT | |
| Women's British Open | CUT | |

^ The Evian Championship was added as a major in 2013.

Did not play

LA = low amateur
CUT = missed the half-way cut
NT = no tournament
T = tied

=== Summary ===
| Tournament | Wins | 2nd | 3rd | Top-5 | Top-10 | Top-25 | Events | Cuts made |
|---|---|---|---|---|---|---|---|---|
| ANA Inspiration | 0 | 0 | 0 | 0 | 0 | 2 | 8 | 3 |
| U.S. Women's Open | 0 | 0 | 0 | 0 | 0 | 0 | 5 | 0 |
| Women's PGA Championship | 0 | 0 | 0 | 0 | 0 | 2 | 10 | 5 |
| The Evian Championship | 0 | 0 | 0 | 0 | 0 | 0 | 6 | 3 |
| Women's British Open | 0 | 0 | 0 | 0 | 0 | 0 | 8 | 5 |
| Totals | 0 | 0 | 0 | 0 | 0 | 4 | 37 | 16 |

- Most consecutive cuts made – 3 (twice)
- Longest streak of top-10s – none

== LPGA Tour career summary ==
| Year | Tournaments played | Cuts made | Wins | 2nd | 3rd | Top 10s | Best finish | Earnings ($) | Money list rank | Scoring average | Scoring rank |
|---|---|---|---|---|---|---|---|---|---|---|---|
| 2007 | 1 | 1 | 0 | 0 | 0 | 0 | T22 | n/a | n/a | 71.66 | n/a |
| 2009 | 1 | 1 | 0 | 0 | 0 | 0 | T21 | n/a | n/a | 72.50 | n/a |
| 2010 | 2 | 0 | 0 | 0 | 0 | 0 | MC | 0 | n/a | 79.00 | n/a |
| 2011 | 14 | 12 | 0 | 1 | 0 | 0 | 2 | 237,365 | 41 | 72.75 | 52 |
| 2012 | 20 | 10 | 0 | 0 | 0 | 0 | T33 | 48,695 | 101 | 74.09 | 113 |
| 2013 | 14 | 5 | 0 | 0 | 0 | 0 | T30 | 25,184 | 117 | 73.72 | 125 |
| 2014 | 27 | 21 | 0 | 0 | 0 | 0 | T16 | 200,607 | 67 | 72.19 | 67 |
| 2015 | 22 | 11 | 0 | 0 | 0 | 0 | T13 | 114,287 | 84 | 72.73 | 92 |
| 2016 | 25 | 16 | 0 | 0 | 0 | 0 | T11 | 172,233 | 83 | 72.35 | 84 |
| 2017 | 25 | 14 | 0 | 0 | 0 | 2 | T6 | 203,875 | 76 | 72.20 | 103 |
| 2018 | 25 | 15 | 0 | 0 | 0 | 1 | T8 | 195,647 | 81 | 71.97 | 82 |
| 2019 | 23 | 12 | 0 | 0 | 1 | 2 | T3 | 249,154 | 70 | 72.23 | 112 |
| 2020 | 14 | 4 | 0 | 0 | 0 | 0 | T11 | 37,241 | 116 | 73.69 | 126 |
| 2021 | 13 | 3 | 0 | 0 | 0 | 0 | T52 | 11,321 | 167 | 73.81 | 150 |

- Official as of the 2021 season

== U.S. national team appearances ==
Amateur

- Curtis Cup: 2008 (winners)
- Espirito Santo Trophy: 2008

=== Curtis Cup record ===
| Year | Total matches | Total W–L–H | Singles W–L–H | Foursomes W–L–H | Fourballs W–L–H | Points won | Points % |
|---|---|---|---|---|---|---|---|
| 2008 | 4 | 2–1–1 | 1–0–0 def. C. Booth 6&5 | 1–0–1 won w/ A. Blumenherst 1 up, halved w/ A. Blumenherst | 0–1–0 lost w/ Meghan Bolger, 3&2 | 2.5 | 62.5% |
