= Teva Championship =

Golf tournament

The Teva Championship was an annual golf tournament for professional women golfers on the Futures Tour, the LPGA Tour's developmental tour. The event has been played since 2007 in the Cincinnati, Ohio area.

The title sponsor was Teva Pharmaceuticals, the parent company of Duramed, which was the overall sponsor of the Futures Tour. Prior to 2010, the tournament was known as The Duramed Championship.

The tournament was a 54-hole event, as are most Futures Tour tournaments, and included pre-tournament pro-am opportunities, in which local amateur golfers could play with the professional golfers from the tour as a benefit for local charities. The benefiting charity of the Teva Championship was the National Multiple Sclerosis Society Ohio Valley Chapter.

== Winners ==
Year	Date	Champion	Country	Score	Tournament location	Purse ($)	Winner's share ($)
2011	Jun 10–12	Lisa Ferrero	United States	207 (−6)	The Golf Center at Kings Island	135,000	18,900
2010	Jun 11–13	Christine Song	United States	198 (−15)	The Golf Center at Kings Island	135,000	18,900
2009	Jun 19–21	Whitney Wade	United States	204 (−9)	The Golf Center at Kings Island	125,000	17,500
2008	Jun 20–22	Stephanie Otteson	United States	204 (−9)	The Golf Center at Kings Island	110,000	15,400
2007	Jun 22–24	Seo-Jae Lee	South Korea	201 (−15)	The Golf Club at Stonelick Hills	75,000	10,500

== Tournament records ==
Year	Player	Score	Round	Course
2007	Mollie Fankhauser	63 (−9)	3rd	The Golf Club at Stonelick Hills
2009	Pernilla Lindberg	63 (−8)	1st	The Golf Center at Kings Island
