= Violeta Retamoza =

Mexican professional golfer (born 1983)

Personal information
- Nationality: Mexico
- Born: 20 July 1983 (age 43) Aguascalientes, Mexico
- Height: 5 ft 6 in (1.68 m)

Career
- Sport: Golf
- College: University of Tennessee (graduated 2006)
- Turned professional: 2006
- Former tours: LPGA Tour (2008); Futures Tour (2007, 2009)
- Professional wins: 1

Number of wins by tour
- Epson Tour: 1

Achievements and awards
- Futures Tour Rookie of the Year: 2007

Violeta Retamoza (born 20 July 1983) is a Mexican professional golfer who formerly played on the Futures Tour and on the LPGA Tour.

== Early life ==
Retamoza was born and raised in Aguascalientes, Mexico. She began playing golf at the age of eight. She was a semifinalist at the 2000 U.S. Girls' Junior. She was a seven-year member of the Mexico National Team.

She recorded 15 top-10 finishes in collegiate competition, including four wins, while at the University of Tennessee. As an amateur she participated in the two LPGA tournaments held in Mexico: the MasterCard Classic and the Corona Championship.

== Professional career ==
=== Futures Tour ===
In 2006, Retamoza turned professional. After failing to qualify for the LPGA via qualifying school, she joined the Duramed Futures Tour, and claimed her first professional win at the 2007 Alliance Bank Golf Classic, besides other three runner-up finishes.

She also participated in the MasterCard Classic on the LPGA Tour, where she made the cut finishing tied for 63rd; and the Corona Championship, where she missed the cut by two strokes. Both tournaments were held in her native Mexico. She also was named 2007 Futures Tour Rookie of the Year.

=== LPGA Tour ===
In September 2007, Retamoza earned exempt status on the LPGA Tour for the 2008 season, by finishing fourth on the Duramed Futures Tour money list; the top five finishers earn such status.

In 2008, her rookie year on the LPGA Tour, she missed the cut in all except one of the 19 tournaments in which she played. She entered LPGA Qualifying School in the fall of 2008 to attempt to retain her playing privileges for 2009, but did not make the cut in the final qualifying tournament where she finished last among all competitors. She returned to the Futures Tour in 2009, where she competed in 24 events, making the cut in eight with a tournament best finish of T24.

She did not enter either the Futures Tour or LPGA Qualifying Tournaments in the fall of 2009 and is not a playing member of either tour in 2010.

== Personal life ==
Retamoza is a native of the state of Aguascalientes, though both of her parents were born in Culiacán. Her grandfather, Héctor León Lara, played for the Tomateros de Culiacán.

== Awards and honors ==
- Retamoza was a SEC All-Conference First Team selection three times: in 2003, 2004, and 2005
- In 2003, she was named the SEC Freshman of the Year.
- In 2003, Retamoza earned NGCA All-American Second Team selection.
- In 2005, she earned NGCA All-American First Team selection.
- In 2005, Retamoza was named the SEC Player of the Year.
- In 2007, she earned Futures Tour Rookie of the Year honors.

== Professional wins (1) ==
=== Futures Tour (1) ===
- 2007 (1) Alliance Bank Golf Classic

== Career summary ==
Year	Tour	Events	Cuts made	Wins	2nd	3rd	Top 10s	Earnings ($)	Rank	Scoring average
2007	Futures Tour	17	16	1	3	1	6	49,895	4	72.76
2008	LPGA Tour	19	1	0	0	0	0	2,150	188	79.44
2009	Futures Tour	17	8	0	0	0	0	5,267	94	74.73
