= Ladies Titan Tire Challenge =

Annual golf tournament (2009–2012)

The Ladies Titan Tire Challenge was an annual golf tournament for professional women golfers on the Symetra Tour, the LPGA Tour's developmental tour. The event was a part of the Symetra Tour's schedule from 2009 to 2012. It was played at the Hunters Ridge Golf Course in Marion, Iowa.

The title sponsor was Titan Tire, a manufacturer of off-road tires, with headquarters in Des Moines, Iowa.

The tournament was a 54-hole event, as are most Symetra Tour tournaments, and included pre-tournament pro-am opportunities, in which local amateur golfers played with the professional golfers from the Tour as a benefit for local charities. The benefiting charity was the Junior League of Cedar Rapids.

== Winners ==
Year	Dates	Champion	Country	Score	Purse ($)	Winner's share ($)
2012	Jun 8–10	Lauren Doughtie	United States	212 (−4)	110,000	16,500
2011	Jun 3–5	Kathleen Ekey	United States	215 (−1)	110,000	15,400
2010	Jun 4–6	Christine Song	United States	205 (−11)	110,000	15,400
2009	Jun 5–7	Mina Harigae	United States	200 (−16)	110,000	15,400

== Tournament record ==
Year	Player	Score	Round
2009	Mina Harigae	64 (−8)	1st
