= Sydnee Michaels =

American golfer

Personal information
- Nationality: United States
- Born: June 15, 1988 (age 38) Upland, California, U.S.
- Height: 5 ft 7 in (1.70 m)

Career
- Sport: Golf
- College: UCLA (graduated 2010)
- Turned professional: 2010
- Current tour: LPGA Tour (joined 2012)
- Former tour: Futures Tour (2011)
- Professional wins: 2

Number of wins by tour
- Epson Tour: 2

Best results in LPGA major championships
- Chevron Championship: T68: 2006
- Women's PGA C'ship: T22: 2014
- U.S. Women's Open: T11: 2016
- Women's British Open: T52: 2013
- Evian Championship: T37: 2013

Achievements and awards
- Futures Tour Rookie of the Year: 2011

Sydnee Michaels (born June 15, 1988) is an American professional golfer currently playing on the LPGA Tour as of 2012. Michaels was a graduate of the 2011 LPGA Futures Tour.

== Early life ==
Michaels was born in Upland, California, and is the youngest of eight children. As a child she trained in figure skating, but when she was eight years old her father told her that she would grow too tall for the sport.

== College ==
Michaels played college golf at the University of California, Los Angeles. She graduated with a bachelor's degree in History/ Sociology.

== Professional ==
Michaels turned professional in 2010, and joined the Futures Tour on January 18, 2011. Michaels won the last two events of the season, one was the Price Chopper Tour Championship. She finished fourth of the Futures Tour official money list in 2011, and was a full member of the 2012 LPGA Tour. Michaels earned $56,232 on the LPGA Futures Tour in 2011. This allowed Michaels to be awarded the Futures Tour Rookie of the Year award.

== Professional wins (2) ==
=== Futures Tour wins (2) ===
No.	Date	Tournament	Winning score	Margin of victory	Runner-up
1	Aug 28, 2011	Vidalia Championship	−9 (68-69-70=207)	8 strokes	(Japan) Ayaka Kaneko
2	Sep 11, 2011	Price Chopper Tour Championship	−8 (69-68-65=202)	1 stroke	(United States) Jessi Gebhardt

== Team appearances ==
Amateur

- Junior Solheim Cup (representing the United States): 2005 (winners), 2007
