= 2012 Symetra Tour =

The 2012 Symetra Tour (formerly the Futures Tour) was a series of professional women's golf tournaments held from March through September 2012 in the United States. It is the second-tier women's professional golf tour in the United States and the "official developmental tour" of the LPGA Tour. In 2012, its total prize money was $1,755,000.

== Leading money winners ==
The top ten money winners at the end of the season gained fully exempt cards on the LPGA Tour for the 2013 season. In previous years, only the top five players received fully exempt cards while the next five receiving partial status.

Rank	Player	Country	Events	Prize money ($)
1	Esther Choe	United States	6	55,690
2	Paola Moreno	Colombia	12	50,908
3	Victoria Elizabeth	United States	16	46,565
4	Thidapa Suwannapura	Thailand	13	42,884
5	Daniela Iacobelli	United States	16	41,049
6	Mi Hyang Lee	South Korea	14	40,882
7	Jenny Gleason	United States	11	38,741
8	Julia Boland	Australia	16	38,447
9	Nicole Smith	United States	16	38,004
10	Sara-Maude Juneau	Canada	15	37,632

== Schedule and results ==
The number in parentheses after winners' names show the player's total number of official money, individual event wins on the Symetra Tour including that event.

Dates	Tournament	Location	Winner
March 23–25	Florida's Natural Charity Classic	Florida	(United States) Megan McChrystal (1)
April 20–22	Sara Bay Classic	Florida	(United States) Esther Choe (1)
April 27–20	Riviera Nayarit Classic	Mexico	(United States) Esther Choe (2)
June 1–3	My Marsh Golf Classic	Indiana	(United States) Sara Brown (1)
June 8–10	Ladies Titan Tire Challenge	Iowa	(United States) Lauren Doughtie (1)
June 15–17	Tate & Lyle Players Championship	Illinois	(Australia) Kristie Smith (2)
June 29 – July 1	Island Resort Championship	Michigan	(United States) Leah Wigger (2)
July 20–22	Northeast Delta Dental International	New Hampshire	(United States) Jenny Gleason (3)
July 27–29	Credit Union Classic	New York	(United States) Victoria Elizabeth (1)
August 3–5	The Credit Union Challenge	New York	(United States) Jaclyn Sweeney (1)
August 10–12	Four Winds Invitational	Indiana	(Australia) Julia Boland (1)
August 17–19	Eagle Classic	Virginia	(Colombia) Paola Moreno (2)
August 24–26	Challenge at Musket Ridge	Maryland	(South Korea) Misun Cho (3)
September 14–16	Symetra Classic	North Carolina	(South Korea) Mi Hyang Lee (1)
September 21–23	Vidalia Championship	Georgia	(Thailand) Thidapa Suwannapura (1)
September 28–30	Daytona Beach Invitational	Florida	(United States) Daniela Iacobelli (1)

== Awards ==
- Player of the Year, player who leads the money list at the end of the season
  - (United States) Esther Choe
- Gaëlle Truet Rookie of the Year Award, first year player with the highest finish on the official money list
  - (South Korea) Mi Hyang Lee
- Heather Wilbur Spirit Award, a player who "best exemplifies dedication, courage, perseverance, love of the game and spirit toward achieving goals as a professional golfer."
  - (United States) Nicole Jeray

== See also ==
- 2012 LPGA Tour
- 2012 in golf
