= Kansas City Championship =

The Kansas City Championship was a golf tournament on the Symetra Tour. From 2007 to 2010, it was played at Leawood South Country Club in Leawood, Kansas. It returned in 2016 and was played at the Staley Farms Golf Club in Kansas City, Missouri.

The tournament was a 54-hole event, as are most Symetra Tour tournaments.

== Winners ==
Year	Date	Champion	Country	Score	Purse ($)	Winner's share ($)
2016	Jul 29–31	Peiyun Chien	Chinese Taipei	135 (−9)†	100,000	15,000
2011–15	No tournament					
2010	May 14–16	Ryann O'Toole	United States	65 (−6)^	50,000	7,000
2009	May 17–19	Elisa Serramia	Spain	218 (+5)	100,000	14,000
2008	May 16–18	Mindy Kim	South Korea	210 (−3)	90,000	12,600
2007	May 18–20	Liz Janangelo	United States	217 (+4)*	80,000	11,200

^ Rain-shortened to 18 holes.
† Rain-shortened to 36 holes.
* Championship won in sudden-death playoff.

== Tournament records ==
Year	Player	Score	Round	Course
2016	Jackie Stoelting	65 (−7)	1st	Staley Farms Golf Club
2010	Ryann O'Toole	65 (−6)	1st	Leawood South Country Club
