= Pennsylvania Classic (Futures Tour) =

Annual women golf tournament

Tournament information
- Location: Harrisburg, Pennsylvania
- Established: 2009
- Courses: Felicita Mountain Resort & Spa
- Par: 72
- Length: 6,319 yards (5,778 m)
- Tour: Futures Tour
- Format: Stroke play
- Prize fund: US$110,000
- Month played: August
- Final year: 2011

Tournament record score
- Aggregate: 204 Dori Carter (2010)
- To par: −12 Dori Carter (2010)

Final champion
- (Australia) Cathryn Bristow

The Pennsylvania Classic was an annual golf tournament for professional women golfers on the Futures Tour, the official developmental tour of the LPGA Tour. The event was played from 2009 to 2011 at the Felicita Mountain Resort & Spa in Harrisburg, Pennsylvania.

In 2009, the title sponsor of the tournament was Turkey Hill, a chain of Pennsylvania convenience store/gas stations and its sister company, Turkey Hill Dairy, a dairy processor based in Conestoga, Pennsylvania.

The tournament was a 54-hole event, as are most Futures Tour tournaments, and included pre-tournament pro-am opportunities, in which local amateur golfers can play with the professional golfers from the Tour as a benefit for local charities. The benefiting charity of the Pennsylvania Classic was the Boys & Girls Club of Central Pennsylvania.

Tournament names through the years:

- 2009: Turkey Hill Classic
- 2010–2011: Pennsylvania Classic

== Winners ==
Year	Dates	Champion	Country	Score	Purse ($)	Winner's share ($)
2011	Aug 5–7	Cathryn Bristow	New Zealand	135 (−9)^{2}	110,000	15,400
2010	Aug 6–8	Dori Carter	United States	204 (−12)	110,000	15,400
2009	Aug 21–23	Samantha Richdale^{1}	Canada	206 (−10)	110,000	15,400

^{1}Won in a sudden-death playoff
^{2}Tournament shortened to 36 holes because of rain

== Tournament records ==
Year	Player	Score	Round
2010	Jenny Shin	65 (−7)	2nd
