= 2010 Duramed Futures Tour =

The 2010 Duramed Futures Tour was a series of professional women's golf tournaments held from March through September 2010 in the United States. The Futures Tour is the second-tier women's professional golf tour in the United States and is the "official developmental tour" of the LPGA Tour. In 2010, total prize money on the Futures Tour was $1,920,000, the highest in the 30-year history of the Tour, and for the first time ever, played outside the USA, with one tournament in La Riviera Nayarit, Mexico.

== Leading money winners ==
The top ten money winners at the end of the season gained membership on the LPGA Tour for the 2011 season, with those finishing in the top five positions gaining higher priority for entry into events than those finishing in positions six through ten. Finishers in positions six through ten had the option to attend LPGA Qualifying School to try to improve their membership status for 2011.

| Position | Player | Country | Earnings (US$) |
|---|---|---|---|
| 1 | Cindy LaCrosse | United States | 94,578 |
| 2 | Jennifer Song | United States | 63,375 |
| 3 | Christine Song | United States | 63,036 |
| 4 | Jenny Shin | United States | 53,686 |
| 5 | Gerina Mendoza | United States | 53,408 |
| 6 | Angela Oh | United States | 50,156 |
| 7 | Ryann O'Toole | United States | 45,806 |
| 8 | Tiffany Joh | United States | 41,451 |
| 9 | Hannah Jun | United States | 40,406 |
| 10 | Pornanong Phatlum | Thailand | 39,261 |

== Schedule and results ==
The number in parentheses after winners' names show the player's total number of official money, individual event wins on the Futures Tour including that event.

| Dates | Tournament | Location | Winner |
|---|---|---|---|
| Mar 21 | Florida's Natural Charity Classic | Florida | (United States) Angela Oh (1) |
| Mar 28 | Riviera Nayarit Challenge | Mexico | (United States) Cindy LaCrosse (1) |
| Apr 11 | Daytona Beach Invitational | Florida | (Australia) Kristie Smith (1) |
| Apr 25 | Historic Brownsville Open | Texas | (South Korea) Sophie Jang (1) |
| May 2 | Texas Hill Country Classic | Texas | (Colombia) Paola Moreno (1) |
| May 16 | Mercedes-Benz of Kansas City Championship^{1} | Kansas | (United States) Ryann O'Toole (1) |
| Jun 6 | Ladies Titan Tire Challenge | Iowa | (United States) Christine Song (1) |
| Jun 13 | The Teva Championship | Ohio | (United States) Christine Song (2) |
| Jun 20 | **Tate & Lyle Players Championship** | Illinois | (United States) Jennifer Song (1) |
| Jun 27 | City of Hammond Classic | Indiana | (United States) Nannette Hill (1) |
| Jul 4 | Falls Auto Group Classic | Kentucky | (United States) Ryann O'Toole (2) |
| Jul 18 | ING New England Golf Classic | Connecticut | (United States) Tiffany Joh (1) |
| Jul 25 | The International at Concord | New Hampshire | (United States) Jenny Shin (1) |
| Aug 1 | Alliance Bank Golf Classic | New York | (United States) Cindy LaCrosse (2) |
| Aug 8 | Pennsylvania Classic | Pennsylvania | (United States) Dori Carter (1) |
| Aug 16 | Greater Richmond Golf Classic | Virginia | (United States) Jennifer Song (2) |
| Sep 5 | Price Chopper Tour Championship | New York | (United States) Cindy LaCrosse (3) |

Tournaments in bold are majors
^{1}Tournament shortened to 18 holes due to rain.

== See also ==
- 2010 LPGA Tour
- 2010 in golf
