= Credit Union Classic =

American women's golf tournament

The Credit Union Classic presented by Wegmans was an annual golf tournament for professional women golfers on the Symetra Tour, the LPGA's developmental tour. The event was played from 1996 to 2014 in the Syracuse, New York area.

The title sponsors were three central New York-based credit unions: Empower Federal Credit Union, SEFCU, and The Summit Federal Credit Union. The presenting sponsor was Wegmans, a supermarket chain headquartered in Rochester, New York.

The last benefiting charity from the Credit Union Classic was The First Tee of Syracuse, Inc.

Tournament names through the years:

- 1996–1997: Loretto Futures Golf Classic
- 1998–2000: Fleet Loretto Futures Golf Classic
- 2001–2005: M&T Bank Loretto Futures Golf Classic
- 2006–2011: Alliance Bank Golf Classic
- 2012–2014: Credit Union Classic presented by Wegmans

== Winners ==
Year	Dates	Champion	Country	Score	Location	Purse ($)	Winner's share ($)
2014	Aug 1–3	Veronica Felibert	Venezuela	201 (−12)	Drumlins Country Club	100,000	15,000
2013	Jul 26–28	Olivia Jordan-Higgins	United Kingdom	207 (−6)	Drumlins Country Club	100,000	15,000
2012	Jul 27–29	Victoria Elizabeth	United States	201 (−12)	Drumlins Country Club	100,000	15,000
2011	Jul 29–31	Kathleen Ekey	United States	205 (−8)	Drumlins Country Club	100,000	14,000
2010	Jul 30 – Aug 1	Cindy LaCrosse	United States	201 (−12)	Drumlins Country Club	100,000	14,000
2009	Jul 31 – Aug 2	Jenny Suh	United States	201 (−12)	Drumlins Country Club	100,000	12,500
2008	Jul 18–20	Kim Welch	United States	204 (−9)	The Links at Erie Village	90,000	11,700
2007	Jul 20–22	Violeta Retamoza	Mexico	208 (−5)	The Links at Erie Village	80,000	11,200
2006	Jul 21–23	Ha-Na Chae	South Korea	204 (−9)	The Links at Erie Village	75,000	10,500
2005	Jul 29–31	Kim Brozer	Canada	202 (−11)	The Links at Erie Village	70,000	9,800
2004		Michelle Murphy	United States	207 (−6)	The Links at Erie Village	60,000	8,400
2003		Soo Young Moon	South Korea	207 (−6)	The Links at Erie Village	60,000	8,400
2002		Jimin Kang	South Korea	201 (−12)	The Links at Erie Village	60,000	8,400
2001		Jeanne-Marie Busuttil	France	204 (−9)	The Links at Erie Village	60,000	8,400
2000		Michelle Ellis	Australia	207 (−6)	The Links at Erie Village	50,000	7,000
1999		Marilyn Lovander	United States	207 (−6)	The Links at Erie Village	50,000	7,000
1998		A.J. Eathorne	Canada	207 (−6)	The Links at Erie Village	50,000	6,600
1997		Karen Pearce	Australia	207 (−6)	The Links at Erie Village	40,000	5,300
1996*		Erika Hayashida	Peru	141 (−1)	The Links at Erie Village	50,000	7,500

*Tournament shortened to 36 holes because of rain.

== Tournament records ==
Year	Player	Score	Round	Course
2001	Jeanne-Marie Busuttil	63 (−8)	2nd	The Links at Erie Village
