= 2017 Symetra Tour =

The 2017 Symetra Tour was a series of professional women's golf tournaments held from March through October 2017, in the United States. The Symetra Tour is the second-tier women's professional golf tour in the United States and is the "official developmental tour" of the LPGA Tour. It was previously known as the Futures Tour. In 2017, total prize money on the Symetra Tour was $2,950,000, down from $3,200,000 in 2016.

== Schedule and results ==
The number in parentheses after winners' names show the player's total number of official money, individual event wins on the Symetra Tour including that event.

Date	Tournament	Location	Winner	Purse ($)
Mar 12	Florida's Natural Charity Classic	Florida	(Jersey) Olivia Jordan-Higgins (3)	125,000
Mar 26	IOA Championship	California	(Ecuador) Daniela Darquea (1)	100,000
Apr 1	Gateway Classic	Arizona	(New Zealand) Liv Cheng (1)	100,000
Apr 9	POC MED Golf Classic	California	(South Korea) Kim Hye-min (1)	100,000
Apr 23	Sara Bay Classic	Florida	(Australia) Hannah Green (1)	110,000
Apr 30	Symetra Classic	Georgia	(Denmark) Nanna Koerstz Madsen (1)	150,000
May 14	Self Regional Healthcare Foundation Classic	South Carolina	(France) Céline Boutier (1)	200,000
Jun 4	Fuccillo Kia Championship	New York	(Denmark) Nanna Koerstz Madsen (2)	125,000
Jun 11	Four Winds Invitational	Indiana	(United States) Kendall Dye (2)	150,000
Jun 18	Decatur-Forsyth Classic	Illinois	(Thailand) Chorphaka Jaengkit (1)	130,000
Jun 25	Island Resort Championship	Michigan	(United States) Emma Talley (1)	150,000
Jul 2	Tullymore Classic	Michigan	(China) Yu Liu (1)	100,000
Jul 9	Donald Ross Centennial Classic	Indiana	(United States) Erynne Lee (2)	200,000
Jul 23	Danielle Downey Credit Union Classic	New York	(Denmark) Nanna Koerstz Madsen (3)	150,000
Jul 30	FireKeepers Casino Hotel Championship	Michigan	(United States) Erynne Lee (3)	100,000
Aug 6	PHC Classic	Wisconsin	(Canada) Brittany Marchand (1)	100,000
Sep 3	Sioux Falls GreatLIFE Challenge	South Dakota	(France) Céline Boutier (2)	210,000
Sep 10	Garden City Charity Classic	Kansas	(Canada) Anne-Catherine Tanguay (1)	150,000
Sep 17	Murphy USA El Dorado Shootout	Arizona	(Australia) Hannah Green (2)	100,000
Sep 24	Guardian Championship	Alabama	(United States) Lindsey Weaver (1)	100,000
Oct 1	IOA Golf Classic	Florida	(Australia) Hannah Green (3)	100,000
Oct 8	Symetra Tour Championship	Florida	(United States) Rachel Rohanna (2)	200,000

== Leading money winners ==
The top ten money winners at the end of the season gained fully exempt cards on the LPGA Tour for the 2018 season.

Rank	Player	Country	Events	Prize money ($)
1	Benyapa Niphatsophon	Thailand	20	124,492
2	Hannah Green	Australia	20	113,880
3	Céline Boutier	France	20	112,044
4	Nanna Koerstz Madsen	Denmark	12	93,115
5	Yu Liu	China	21	86,110
6	Erynne Lee	United States	22	80,780
7	Lindsey Weaver	United States	22	76,755
8	Anne-Catherine Tanguay	Canada	20	76,663
9	Emma Talley	United States	21	76,556
10	Katelyn Dambaugh	United States	12	63,023

== Awards ==
- Player of the Year, player who leads the money list at the end of the season
  - (Thailand) Benyapa Niphatsophon
- Gaëlle Truet Rookie of the Year Award, first year player with the highest finish on the official money list
  - (Australia) Hannah Green
- Trainor Award, an individual or group that has made a significant contribution to women's golf.
  - Potawatomi Nation tribes that support the Symetra Tour
- Heather Wilbur Spirit Award, a Symmetry Tour player who "best exemplifies dedication, courage, perseverance, love of the game and spirit toward achieving goals as a professional golfer."
  - (United States) Laura Wearn

== See also ==
- 2017 LPGA Tour
- 2017 in golf
