= 2011 LPGA Futures Tour =

The 2011 LPGA Futures Tour was a series of professional women's golf tournaments held from March through September 2011 in the United States. The LPGA Futures Tour is the second-tier women's professional golf tour in the United States and is the "official developmental tour" of the LPGA Tour. In 2011, total prize money on the Futures Tour was $1,765,000.

== Leading money winners ==
The top ten money winners at the end of the season gained membership on the LPGA Tour for the 2012 season, with those finishing in the top five positions gaining higher priority for entry into events than those finishing in positions six through ten. Finishers in positions six through ten had the option to attend LPGA Qualifying School to try to improve their membership status for 2012.

Rank	Player	Country	Events	Prize money ($)
1	Kathleen Ekey	United States	16	66,412
2	Lisa Ferrero	United States	16	58,808
3	Mo Martin	United States	16	58,218
4	Sydnee Michaels	United States	15	56,232
5	Jane Rah	United States	15	46,669
6	Tiffany Joh	United States	7	37,566
7	Valentine Derrey	France	15	34,572
8	Hanna Kang	South Korea	15	32,992
9	Jenny Gleason	United States	15	30,331
10	Tzu-Chi Lin	Taiwan	14	29,861

Source and complete list: Futures Tour official website.

== Schedule and results ==
The number in parentheses after winners' names show the player's total number of official money, individual event wins on the Futures Tour including that event.

Dates	Tournament	Location	Winner	Notes
March 25–27	Florida's Natural Charity Classic	Florida	(Taiwan) Tzu-Chi Lin (1)	
April 1–3	Daytona Beach Invitational	Florida	(Japan) Haru Nomura (1)	
April 8–10	Santorini Riviera Nayarit Classic	Mexico	(United States) Ryann O'Toole (3)	
April 29–May 1	Symetra Classic	Texas	(United States) Lisa Ferrero (1)	
June 3–5	Ladies Titan Tire Challenge	Iowa	(United States) Kathleen Ekey (1)	
June 10–12	Teva Championship	Ohio	(United States) Lisa Ferrero (2)	
June 16–19	**Tate & Lyle Players Championship**	Illinois	(France) Valentine Derrey (1)	
June 24–26	Island Resort Championship	Michigan	(United States) Stephanie Kim (1)	New tournament
June 30–July 2	South Shore Championship	Indiana	(United States) Tiffany Joh (2)	New tournament
July 15–17	ING New England Golf Classic	Connecticut	(United States) Brittany Johnston (1)	
July 22–24	The International at Concord	New Hampshire	(Canada) Jessica Shepley (1)	
July 29–31	Alliance Bank Golf Classic	New York	(United States) Kathleen Ekey (2)	
August 5–7	Pennsylvania Classic	Pennsylvania	(New Zealand) Cathryn Bristow (1)	
August 12–14	Eagle Classic	Virginia	(United States) Mo Martin (3)	
August 26–28	Vidalia Championship	Georgia	(United States) Sydnee Michaels (1)	New tournament
September 9–11	Price Chopper Tour Championship	New York	(United States) Sydnee Michaels (2)	

Tournaments in bold are majors.
Source: Futures Tour official website.

== Awards ==
- Player of the Year, player who leads the money list at the end of the season
  - (United States) Kathleen Ekey
- Gaëlle Truet Rookie of the Year Award, first year player with the highest finish on the official money list
  - (United States) Sydnee Michaels
- Heather Wilbur Spirit Award, a Futures Tour player who "best exemplifies dedication, courage, perseverance, love of the game and spirit toward achieving goals as a professional golfer."
  - (Canada) Izzy Beisiegel

== See also ==
- 2011 LPGA Tour
- 2011 in golf
