= Kathleen Ekey =

American professional golfer (born 1986)

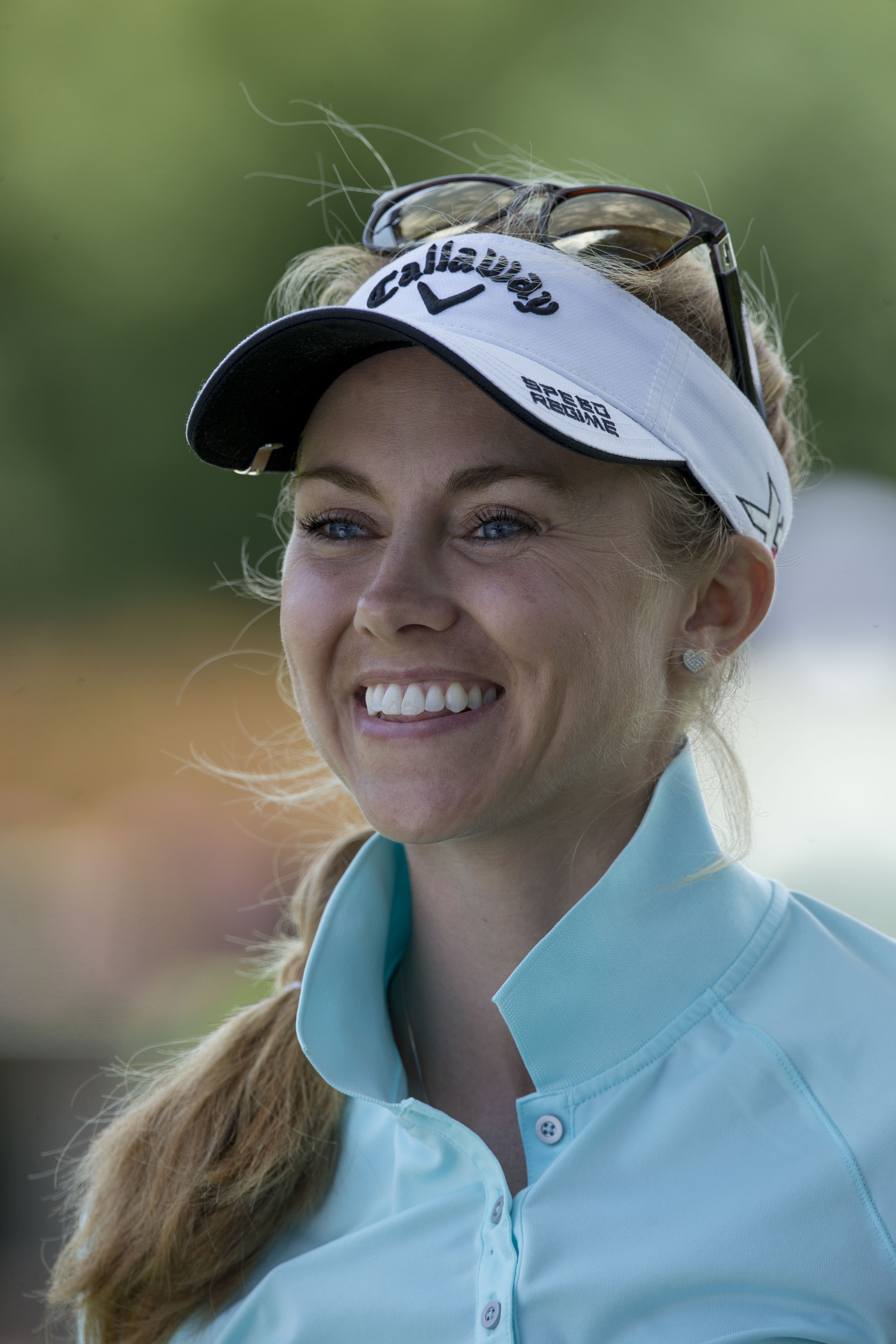
- Ekey at the 2015 Kingsmill Championship

Personal information
- Nationality: United States
- Born: 8 November 1986 (age 39) Cleveland, Ohio, U.S.
- Height: 5 ft 7 in (1.70 m)

Career
- Sport: Golf
- College: Furman University; University of Alabama (graduated 2008)
- Turned professional: 2009
- Former tours: LPGA Tour (joined 2012); Futures Tour (joined 2009)
- Professional wins: 2

Number of wins by tour
- Epson Tour: 2

Best results in LPGA major championships
- Chevron Championship: DNP
- Women's PGA C'ship: T62: 2014
- U.S. Women's Open: DNP
- Women's British Open: CUT: 2012
- Evian Championship: CUT: 2013

Achievements and awards
- Futures Tour Player of the Year: 2011

Kathleen Ekey (born November 8, 1986) is an American professional golfer who played on the LPGA Tour.

== Early life and amateur career ==
Ekey was born in Cleveland, Ohio, on November 8, 1986, to Sam and Laura Ekey. She is a graduate of Walsh Jesuit High School in Cuyahoga Falls, Ohio.

Ekey played college golf for the first two years of college at Furman University and transferred to the University of Alabama for the last two years of college. She graduated with her bachelor's degree in Communications Studies.

== Professional career ==
In 2009, Ekey turned professional. She joined the Futures Tour on July 14, 2009. In 2011, she finished at the top of the Futures Tour official money list and was named the Tour's Player of the Year.

== Awards and honors ==
- In 2011, Ekey won the Futures Tour's Player of the Year award.
- In 2022, she entered the Hall of Fame of Walsh Jesuit High School, her alma mater.

== Professional wins (2) ==
=== Futures Tour wins (2) ===
No.	Date	Tournament	Winning score	Margin of victory	Runner(s)-up
1	June 5, 2011	Ladies Titan Tire Challenge	–1 (67–71–77=215)	1 stroke	(Malaysia) Jean Chua, (United States) Carling Coffing
2	July 31, 2011	Alliance Bank Golf Classic	–8 (68–68–69=205)	3 strokes	(United States) Jenny Suh
