= Daniela Iacobelli =

American professional golfer

Personal information
- Nationality: United States
- Born: November 27, 1987 (age 38) Detroit, Michigan, U.S.
- Height: 5 ft 7 in (170 cm)

Career
- Sport: Golf
- College: Florida Institute of Technology
- Turned professional: 2010
- Current tour: Epson Tour
- Former tour: LPGA Tour
- Professional wins: 5

Number of wins by tour
- Epson Tour: 5

Best results in LPGA major championships
- Chevron Championship: DNP
- Women's PGA C'ship: CUT: 2013, 2016, 2018
- U.S. Women's Open: DNP
- Women's British Open: DNP
- Evian Championship: CUT: 2019

Daniela Iacobelli (born November 27, 1987) is an American professional golfer who has played on the Epson Tour and LPGA Tour.

== Early life and education ==
Iacobelli was born in Detroit, Michigan. She played college golf at Florida Institute of Technology where she won eight times including the 2007 NCAA Division II Championship. She graduated in 2009.

== Professional career ==
Iacobelli turned professional in 2010 and has played mainly on the Symetra Tour, winning three times: 2012 Daytona Beach Invitational, 2015 Tullymore Classic, and 2019 Island Resort Championship. She played on the LPGA Tour in 2013, 2016, and 2018 with a best finish of 9th at the 2018 Lotte Championship. She later won twice on the Epson Tour.

== Professional wins (5) ==
=== Epson Tour wins (5) ===
No.	Date	Tournament	Winning score	To par	Margin of victory	Runner(s)-up
1	Sep 30, 2012	Daytona Beach Invitational	69-68-68=205	−11	2 strokes	(United States) Esther Choe (United States) Stephanie Connelly Eiswerth
2	Jul 5, 2015	Tullymore Classic	64-70-66=200	−16	1 stroke	(Japan) Chie Arimura (United States) Lee Lopez (China) Haruka Morita-Wanyaolu (a)
3	Jun 23, 2019	Island Resort Championship	69-71-65=205	−11	Playoff	(United States) Cindy Ha
4	Sep 4, 2022	Wildhorse Ladies Golf Classic	65-67-66=198	−18	3 strokes	(Thailand) Pavarisa Yoktuan
5	Jul 14, 2024	Hartford HealthCare Women's Championship	66-67-67=200	−16	1 stroke	(United States) Amelia Lewis
