= Demi Runas =

American professional golfer (born 1991)

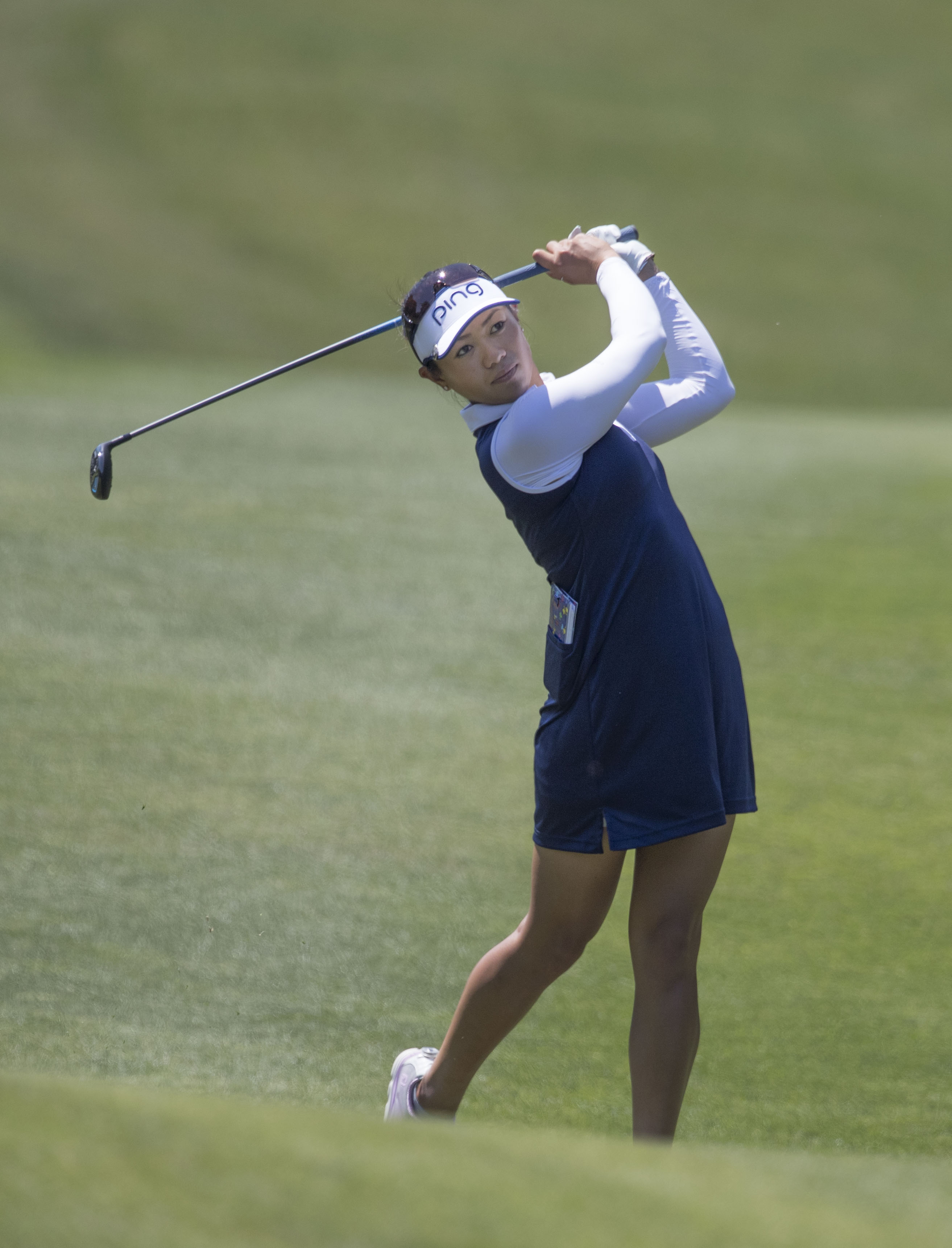
- Runas in 2017

Personal information
- Full name: Demi Frances Runas
- Nationality: United States
- Born: 1991 (age 34–35) Los Angeles, California, U.S.
- Height: 5 ft 6 in (168 cm)

Career
- Sport: Golf
- College: University of California, Davis
- Turned professional: 2014
- Former tours: LPGA Tour; Symetra Tour

Best results in LPGA major championships
- Chevron Championship: DNP
- Women's PGA C'ship: CUT: 2015, 2017
- U.S. Women's Open: DNP
- Women's British Open: DNP
- Evian Championship: DNP

Achievements and awards
- Big West Player of the Year: 2011, 2012, 2013

Demi Frances Runas (born 1991) is an American professional golfer who played on the LPGA Tour. She began her professional career in 2014.

== Early life ==
Runas was born in 1991 in Los Angeles, California to Filipino parents. She first played golf at the age of 8. She attended Torrance High School in Torrance, California. Throughout high school, Runas was active in the schools golf and soccer teams.

== College golf career ==
Runas attended University of California, Davis where she was a member of the golf team. In 2009–10, she had seven top-20 finishes, including a runner-up showing at the Juli Inkster Spartan Invitational. She capped her Big West tournament debut with a 1-over 73, tied for lowest of the day. She finished the year with All-Big West First team honors as well as Big West Player of the Year. She advanced to U.S. Women's Amateur quarterfinals in the summer following sophomore season. In Runas' final two years, she continued being awarded All-Conference and Player of the year honors, including two more advancements to match play at U.S. Women's Amateur her junior and senior years.

== Professional golf career ==
Runas played on the Symetra Tour in 2014, with two second place and two third-place finishes, She finished ninth on the money list to earn her 2015 LPGA Tour card.

Runas made her LPGA Tour debut on January 8, 2015, at the Coates Golf Championship finishing 6-over after two rounds and missing the cut. In March 2015, Runas recorded her first earnings when she finished 6-under at the JTBC Founders Cup and finished 54th overall for $4,300. In 2016, Runas recorded her first top-ten finish, at the Meijer LPGA Classic, finishing tied for 10th with 9-under.

== LPGA Tour career summary ==
Season	Starts	Cuts made	Wins	2nd	3rd	Top 10	Top 25	Top 50	Earnings ($)	Money list rank
2015	18	3	0	0	0	0	0	1	14,799	147
2016	12	7	0	0	0	1	1	5	42,602	124
2017	15	4	0	0	0	0	1	2	20,020	149
Career	45	14	0	0	0	1	2	8	81,421	649
